= 2008 UK Championship =

2008 Maplin UK Championship
Tournament information
- Dates: 13–21 December 2008
- Venue: Telford International Centre
- City: Telford
- Country: England
- Organisation: WPBSA
- Format: Ranking event
- Total prize fund: £625,000
- Winner's share: £100,000
- Highest break: Ding Junhui (CHN) (147)

Final
- Champion: Shaun Murphy (ENG)
- Runner-up: Marco Fu (HKG)
- Score: 10–9

The 2008 UK Championship (officially the 2008 Maplin UK Championship) was a professional ranking snooker tournament that took place between 13 and 21 December 2008 at the Telford International Centre in Telford, England. It was the 32nd edition of the event.

World Snooker, the sports governing body, opened an investigation into allegations of match fixing, after Stephen Maguire beat Jamie Burnett 9–3 in the first round. Several bookmakers had stopped taking bets on the match before it even started, when reports of a number of large sums having been placed on the same correct score began to circulate within the industry. Just prior to the 2009 World Championship, where Maguire and Burnett were drawn together the first round, it was announced that Strathclyde Police had opened an official enquiry into the match. The enquiry was closed in 2011 with no criminal charges against either of them, and a World Snooker disciplinary enquiry was announced, which ended without any regulatory action. In September 2013 it was announced, that Stephen Lee was found guilty of agreeing to lose the first frame of his first and second round matches.

Shaun Murphy won the title with a 10–9 victory over Marco Fu.

== Prize fund ==
The breakdown of prize money for this year is shown below:

- Winner: £100,000
- Runner-up: £46,000
- Semi-final: £23,250
- Quarter-final: £16,450
- Last 16: £12,050
- Last 32: £8,750
- Last 48: £5,500
- Last 64: £2,300
- Stage one highest break: £500
- Stage two highest break: £5,000
- Stage one maximum break: £1,000
- Stage two maximum break: £25,000
- Total: £625,000

== Main draw ==
Last 32; Best of 17 frames
1	Ronnie O'Sullivan (ENG)	9
Rory McLeod (ENG)	6
12	Joe Perry (ENG)	9
Mark Davis (ENG) (Note: Mark Davis retired at 0–2 due to illness)	0
14	Marco Fu (HKG)	9
Barry Hawkins (ENG)	6
8	Ryan Day (WAL)	5
Matthew Stevens (WAL)	9
7	Ali Carter (ENG)	9
Ian McCulloch (ENG) (Note: Ian McCulloch retired at 2–6 due to illness.)	2
9	Peter Ebdon (ENG)	9
Andrew Higginson (ENG)	8
13	Graeme Dott (SCO)	9
Ken Doherty (IRL)	4
4	Mark Selby (ENG)	7
Mark Williams (WAL)	9
3	Shaun Murphy (ENG)	9
Martin Gould (ENG)	7
16	Mark Allen (NIR)	9
Stuart Bingham (ENG)	2
15	Mark King (ENG)	9
Judd Trump (ENG)	8
6	Stephen Hendry (SCO)	7
Stephen Lee (ENG)	9
5	John Higgins (SCO)	9
Joe Swail (NIR)	7
11	Ding Junhui (CHN)	9
Steve Davis (ENG)	6
10	Neil Robertson (AUS)	9
Michael Holt (ENG)	7
2	Stephen Maguire (SCO)	9
Jamie Burnett (SCO)	3

Last 16; Best of 17 frames
1	(England) Ronnie O'Sullivan	5
12	(England) Joe Perry	9
14	(Hong Kong) Marco Fu	9
(Wales) Matthew Stevens	5
7	(England) Ali Carter	9
9	(England) Peter Ebdon	5
13	(Scotland) Graeme Dott	7
(Wales) Mark Williams	9
3	(England) Shaun Murphy	9
16	(Northern Ireland) Mark Allen	5
15	(England) Mark King	5
(England) Stephen Lee	9
5	(Scotland) John Higgins	9
11	(China) Ding Junhui	4
10	(Australia) Neil Robertson	8
2	(Scotland) Stephen Maguire	9

Quarter-finals; Best of 17 frames
12	(England) Joe Perry	7
14	(Hong Kong) Marco Fu	9
7	(England) Ali Carter	9
(Wales) Mark Williams	8
3	(England) Shaun Murphy	9
(England) Stephen Lee	3
5	(Scotland) John Higgins	7
2	(Scotland) Stephen Maguire	9

Semi-finals; Best of 17 frames
14	(Hong Kong) Marco Fu	9
7	(England) Ali Carter	7
3	(England) Shaun Murphy	9
2	(Scotland) Stephen Maguire	4

Final; Best of 19 frames
14	(Hong Kong) Marco Fu	9
3	(England) Shaun Murphy	10

== Final ==
Final: Best of 19 frames. Referee: Jan Verhaas. Telford International Centre, Telford, England, 21 December 2008.
Marco Fu (14); Hong Kong	9–10	Shaun Murphy (3); England
Afternoon: 34–74, 56–48, 0–99 (99), 103–17 (102), 4–70, 0–73 (73), 143–0 (69, 74), 31–66; Evening: 1–77 (77), 66–51, 75–52 (59), 58–45, 0–109 (54), 6–87 (87), 73–39, 73–40, 93–23, 1–69 (64), 24–69
102	Highest break	99
1	Century breaks	0
4	50+ breaks	6

== Qualifying ==
The qualifying took place from December 1 to 8 at the English Institute of Sport in Sheffield, England.

Round 1 Best of 17 frames
Jimmy White (ENG)	9
David Grace (ENG)	8
Scott MacKenzie (SCO)	9
Vincent Muldoon (IRL)	4
Jamie Jones (WAL)	9
Robert Stephen (SCO)	8
Paul Davison (ENG)	9
Wayne Cooper (ENG)	5
Daniel Wells (WAL)	3
Li Hang (CHN)	9
Matthew Couch (ENG)	9
Stefan Mazrocis (NED)	7
James McBain (SCO)	6
Liu Chuang (CHN)	9
Rodney Goggins (IRL)	9
Declan Hughes (NIR) (Note: Declan Hughes conceded the match due to illness.)	1
Supoj Saenla (THA)	9
Andrew Pagett (WAL)	7
Peter Lines (ENG)	9
Michael Georgiou (ENG)	3
Simon Bedford (ENG)	8
Jin Long (CHN)	9
Patrick Wallace (NIR)	9
Stephen Craigie (ENG)	5
Lee Spick (ENG)	9
Chris McBreen (NZL)	6
Matthew Selt (ENG)	9
Andy Lee (ENG)	3
Kuldesh Johal (ENG)	9
Aditya Mehta (IND)	5
Lewis Roberts (ENG)	8
Atthasit Mahitthi (THA)	9

Round 2 Best of 17 frames
Ian Preece (WAL)	8
(England) Jimmy White	9
Mark Davis (ENG)	9
(Scotland) Scott MacKenzie	2
David Gray (ENG)	4
(Wales) Jamie Jones	9
Robert Milkins (ENG)	9
(England) Paul Davison	5
Joe Delaney (IRL)	9
(China) Li Hang	7
Barry Pinches (ENG)	6
(England) Matthew Couch	9
Mark Joyce (ENG)	4
(China) Liu Chuang	9
David Roe (ENG)	0
(Republic of Ireland) Rodney Goggins	9
Martin Gould (ENG)	9
(Thailand) Supoj Saenla	1
Stuart Pettman (ENG)	9
(England) Peter Lines	6
Rod Lawler (ENG)	6
(China) Jin Long	9
Andy Hicks (ENG)	9
(Northern Ireland) Patrick Wallace	7
Andrew Norman (ENG)	7
(England) Lee Spick	9
Liu Song (CHN)	8
(England) Matthew Selt	9
Paul Davies (WAL)	5
(England) Kuldesh Johal	9
David Morris (IRL)	9
(Thailand) Atthasit Mahitthi	2

Round 3 Best of 17 frames
Rory McLeod (ENG)	9
(England) Jimmy White	8
Ricky Walden (ENG)	7
(England) Mark Davis	9
Alan McManus (SCO)	9
(Wales) Jamie Jones	4
Marcus Campbell (SCO)	9
(England) Robert Milkins	4
Mike Dunn (ENG)	6
(Republic of Ireland) Joe Delaney	9
Andrew Higginson (ENG)	9
(England) Matthew Couch	5
David Gilbert (ENG)	1
(China) Liu Chuang	9
Gerard Greene (NIR)	9
(Republic of Ireland) Rodney Goggins	3
Tom Ford (ENG)	6
(England) Martin Gould	9
Jimmy Michie (ENG)	9
(England) Stuart Pettman	7
Judd Trump (ENG)	9
(China) Jin Long	8
John Parrott (ENG) (Note: John Parrott withdrew due to illness.)	1
(England) Andy Hicks	9
Liang Wenbo (CHN)	9
(England) Lee Spick	1
Adrian Gunnell (ENG)	9
(England) Matthew Selt	4
Michael Holt (ENG)	9
(England) Kuldesh Johal	5
Jamie Burnett (SCO)	9
(Republic of Ireland) David Morris	4

Round 4 Best of 17 frames
Dave Harold (ENG)	6
(England) Rory McLeod	9
Nigel Bond (ENG)	2
(England) Mark Davis	9
Barry Hawkins (ENG)	9
(Scotland) Alan McManus	4
Matthew Stevens (WAL)	9
(Scotland) Marcus Campbell	3
Ian McCulloch (ENG)	9
(Republic of Ireland) Joe Delaney	1
Anthony Hamilton (ENG)	4
(England) Andrew Higginson	9
Ken Doherty (IRL)	9
(China) Liu Chuang	4
Mark Williams (WAL)	9
(Northern Ireland) Gerard Greene	7
Dominic Dale (WAL)	6
(England) Martin Gould	9
Stuart Bingham (ENG)	9
(England) Jimmy Michie	3
Michael Judge (IRL)	6
(England) Judd Trump	9
Stephen Lee (ENG)	9
(England) Andy Hicks	6
Joe Swail (NIR)	9
(China) Liang Wenbo	8
Steve Davis (ENG)	9
(England) Adrian Gunnell	7
Fergal O'Brien (IRL)	4
(England) Michael Holt	9
Jamie Cope (ENG)	7
(Scotland) Jamie Burnett	9

== Century breaks ==
=== Televised stage centuries ===
- 147, 130, 100 – Ding Junhui
- 143, 127, 117, 114, 110 – Ronnie O'Sullivan
- 139, 105, 103, 100 – Mark Selby
- 138, 136, 118, 116, 106, 104, 102, 101 – Marco Fu
- 136, 120, 109 – Stephen Lee
- 136, 115 – Shaun Murphy
- 136 – Mark Williams
- 132 – Ali Carter
- 131, 108, 102 – Rory McLeod
- 127, 103 – Peter Ebdon
- 127 – Ken Doherty
- 122, 115, 112, 104 – Stephen Maguire
- 120 – Graeme Dott
- 119, 100, 100 – Mark Allen
- 118 – Neil Robertson
- 113 – Jamie Burnett
- 109, 100 – John Higgins
- 105 – Joe Perry
- 102 – Joe Swail
- 100 – Matthew Stevens

=== Qualifying stage centuries ===
- 143 – Matthew Selt
- 141 – Ricky Walden (Note: Walden made the third 16-red clearance in a professional tournament.)
- 137 – Chris McBreen
- 134, 105 – Joe Swail
- 134 – Jimmy White
- 129, 114 – Alan McManus
- 126 – Mike Dunn
- 123, 106 – Paul Davison
- 122, 101 – Liu Chuang
- 119, 116, 109 – Ian McCulloch
- 118, 107 – Ian Preece
- 116, 111, 106, 104 – Judd Trump
- 116, 108, 105 – Stuart Pettman
- 115 – Rodney Goggins
- 115 – Joe Delaney
- 114, 104, 104 – Lee Spick
- 113 – Atthasit Mahitthi
- 112, 102 – Jamie Jones
- 111, 109 – Rory McLeod
- 111, 101 – Mark Davis
- 108, 102 –Tom Ford
- 106, 105 – Matthew Couch
- 106, 102 – Michael Holt
- 104, 101 – Robert Milkins
- 104 – Barry Pinches
- 104 – Jin Long
- 101 – Patrick Wallace
- 101 – Kuldesh Johal
- 101 – Jamie Burnett
- 101 – Matthew Stevens
- 100 – Steve Davis
