= 2009 China Open (snooker) =

Bank of Beijing China Open
Tournament information
- Dates: 30 March – 5 April 2009
- Venue: Beijing University Students' Gymnasium
- City: Beijing
- Country: China
- Organisation: WPBSA
- Format: Ranking event
- Total prize fund: £292,000
- Winner's share: £52,000
- Highest break: John Higgins (SCO) (140); Ricky Walden (ENG) (140)

Final
- Champion: Peter Ebdon (ENG)
- Runner-up: John Higgins (SCO)
- Score: 10–8

The 2009 Bank of Beijing China Open was a professional ranking snooker tournament that took place between 30 March and 5 April 2009 at the Beijing University Students' Gymnasium in Beijing, China. The event was sponsored by Bank of Beijing and Hyundai.

The defending champion was Stephen Maguire, but he lost in the first round 0–5 against Dave Harold.

Peter Ebdon won in the final 10–8 against John Higgins.

== Prize fund ==
The breakdown of prize money for this year is shown below:

Winner: £52,000
Runner-Up: £25,000
Semi-Finalists: £9,000
Quarter-Finalists: £5,775
Last 16: £5,000
Last 32: £3,450
Last 48: £2,050
Last 64: £1,400

Stage one highest break: £500
Stage two highest break: £2,000

Stage one maximum break: £1,000
Stage two maximum break: £20,000

== Wildcard round ==
These matches were played in Beijing on March 30.

Match		Score	
WC1	Judd Trump (ENG)	3–5	Tang Jun (CHN)
WC2	Ricky Walden (ENG)	5–0	Cao Kaisheng (CHN)
WC3	Stuart Pettman (ENG)	5–2	Cao Yupeng (CHN)
WC4	Rod Lawler (ENG)	3–5	Yu Delu (CHN)
WC5	John Parrott (ENG)	w/d-w/o	Cao Xinlong (CHN)
WC6	David Gray (ENG)	1–5	Tian Pengfei (CHN)
WC7	Michael Holt (ENG)	3–5	Xiao Guodong (CHN)

== Main draw ==
Last 32; Best of 9 frames
1	(Scotland) Stephen Maguire	0
(England) Dave Harold	5
9	(England) Peter Ebdon	5
(China) Tang Jun	2
12	(England) Joe Perry	2
(England) Ricky Walden	5
6	(Scotland) Stephen Hendry	5
(England) Robert Milkins	3
7	(England) Ali Carter	5
(England) Nigel Bond	0
16	(Northern Ireland) Mark Allen	3
(England) Stuart Pettman	5
13	(Scotland) Graeme Dott	5
(China) Yu Delu	3
4	(England) Mark Selby	5
(England) Stephen Lee	1
3	(England) Shaun Murphy	5
(China) Cao Xinlong	1
10	(Australia) Neil Robertson	5
(Northern Ireland) Gerard Greene	4
15	(England) Mark King	5
(Wales) Mark Williams	2
8	(Wales) Ryan Day	5
(England) Jamie Cope	2
5	(Scotland) John Higgins	5
(England) Anthony Hamilton	4
14	(Hong Kong) Marco Fu	2
(China) Tian Pengfei	5
11	(China) Ding Junhui	3
(China) Xiao Guodong	5
2	(England) Ronnie O'Sullivan	5
(Republic of Ireland) Fergal O'Brien	3

Last 16; Best of 9 frames
(England) Dave Harold	3
9	(England) Peter Ebdon	5
(England) Ricky Walden	4
6	(Scotland) Stephen Hendry	5
7	(England) Ali Carter	2
(England) Stuart Pettman	5
13	(Scotland) Graeme Dott	5
4	(England) Mark Selby	1
3	(England) Shaun Murphy	5
10	(Australia) Neil Robertson	1
15	(England) Mark King	2
8	(Wales) Ryan Day	5
5	(Scotland) John Higgins	5
(China) Tian Pengfei	2
(China) Xiao Guodong	3
2	(England) Ronnie O'Sullivan	5

Quarter-finals; Best of 9 frames
9	(England) Peter Ebdon	5
6	(Scotland) Stephen Hendry	1
(England) Stuart Pettman	5
13	(Scotland) Graeme Dott	2
3	(England) Shaun Murphy	0
8	(Wales) Ryan Day	5
5	(Scotland) John Higgins	5
2	(England) Ronnie O'Sullivan	4

Semi-finals; Best of 11 frames
9	(England) Peter Ebdon	6
(England) Stuart Pettman	1
8	(Wales) Ryan Day	4
5	(Scotland) John Higgins	6

Final; Best of 19 frames
9	(England) Peter Ebdon	10
5	(Scotland) John Higgins	8

== Final ==
Final: Best of 19 frames. Referee: Michaela Tabb. Beijing University Students' Gymnasium, Beijing, China, 5 April 2009.
Peter Ebdon (9); England	10–8	John Higgins (5); Scotland
Afternoon: 4–87 (60), 84–1 (84), 109–15 (108), 15–78, 65–5, 68–57, 10–64, 72–56 (Ebdon 54, Higgins 56), 0–140 (140); Evening: 114–16 (52, 57), 13–105 (62), 46–68, 55–25, 32–75 (51), 67–43, 53–63 (Ebdon 52), 64–3, 86–8 (71)
108	Highest break	140
1	Century breaks	1
7	50+ breaks	5

== Qualifying ==
These matches took place between 21 and 24 January 2009 at the Pontin's Centre, Prestatyn, Wales.

Round 1 Best of 9 frames
(England) Lee Spick	4
(England) Stephen Craigie	5
(England) Kuldesh Johal	5
(England) Michael Georgiou	0
(England) Simon Bedford	5
(China) Liu Chuang	4
(England) Paul Davison	2
(Wales) Andrew Pagett	5
(Scotland) Scott MacKenzie	wo
(Northern Ireland) Declan Hughes	wd
(England) Peter Lines	5
(New Zealand) Chris McBreen	0
(Wales) Daniel Wells	5
(England) Wayne Cooper	2
(Wales) Jamie Jones	2
(China) Jin Long	5
(Thailand) Supoj Saenla	1
(Scotland) Robert Stephen	5
(England) Matthew Selt	3
(England) Andy Lee	5
(Scotland) James McBain	5
(Netherlands) Stefan Mazrocis	0
(England) Matthew Couch	2
(Thailand) Atthasit Mahitthi	5
(Northern Ireland) Patrick Wallace	5
(England) David Grace	3
(England) Lewis Roberts	5
(Republic of Ireland) Vincent Muldoon	2
(Republic of Ireland) Rodney Goggins	3
(India) Aditya Mehta	5
(England) Jimmy White	3
(China) Li Hang	5

Round 2 Best of 9 frames
(England) Andrew Norman	5
(England) Stephen Craigie	4
(England) Barry Pinches	4
(England) Kuldesh Johal	5
(England) Andy Hicks	5
(England) Simon Bedford	2
(England) Robert Milkins	5
(Wales) Andrew Pagett	1
(England) Mark Joyce	3
(Scotland) Scott MacKenzie	5
(England) Stuart Pettman	5
(England) Peter Lines	3
(England) Rod Lawler	5
(Wales) Daniel Wells	4
(Republic of Ireland) David Morris	1
(China) Jin Long	5
(China) Liu Song	4
(Scotland) Robert Stephen	5
(Wales) Paul Davies	2
(England) Andy Lee	5
(England) Mark Davis	2
(Scotland) James McBain	5
(Wales) Ian Preece	3
(Thailand) Atthasit Mahitthi	5
(Republic of Ireland) Joe Delaney	3
(Northern Ireland) Patrick Wallace	5
(England) David Gray	5
(England) Lewis Roberts	3
(England) David Roe	1
(India) Aditya Mehta	5
(England) Martin Gould	5
(China) Li Hang	1

Round 3 Best of 9 frames
(England) Jimmy Michie	5
(England) Andrew Norman	4
(England) Judd Trump	5
(England) Kuldesh Johal	3
(England) Ricky Walden	5
(England) Andy Hicks	1
(China) Liang Wenbo (Note: Matches were held over and played in Beijing.)	2
(England) Robert Milkins	5
(Scotland) Jamie Burnett	5
(Scotland) Scott MacKenzie	3
(Scotland) Alan McManus	3
(England) Stuart Pettman	5
(England) Adrian Gunnell	2
(England) Rod Lawler	5
(England) Tom Ford	4
(China) Jin Long	5
(England) John Parrott	5
(Scotland) Robert Stephen	3
(Northern Ireland) Gerard Greene	5
(England) Andy Lee	1
(England) David Gilbert	4
(Scotland) James McBain	5
(England) Mike Dunn	5
(Thailand) Atthasit Mahitthi	1
(England) Rory McLeod	4
(Northern Ireland) Patrick Wallace	5
(Scotland) Marcus Campbell	3
(England) David Gray	5
(England) Michael Holt	5
(India) Aditya Mehta	4
(England) Andrew Higginson	5
(England) Martin Gould	4

Round 4 Best of 9 frames
(England) Dave Harold	5
(England) Jimmy Michie	4
(Republic of Ireland) Ken Doherty	0
(England) Judd Trump	5
(Republic of Ireland) Michael Judge	4
(England) Ricky Walden	5
(Northern Ireland) Joe Swail	4
(England) Robert Milkins	5
(England) Nigel Bond	5
(Scotland) Jamie Burnett	1
(England) Steve Davis	2
(England) Stuart Pettman	5
(Wales) Matthew Stevens	4
(England) Rod Lawler	5
(England) Stephen Lee	5
(China) Jin Long	3
(England) Stuart Bingham	2
(England) John Parrott	5
(Wales) Dominic Dale	3
(Northern Ireland) Gerard Greene	5
(Wales) Mark Williams	5
(Scotland) James McBain	4
(England) Jamie Cope	5
(England) Mike Dunn	3
(England) Anthony Hamilton	5
(Northern Ireland) Patrick Wallace	1
(England) Barry Hawkins	0
(England) David Gray	5
(England) Ian McCulloch	3
(England) Michael Holt	5
(Republic of Ireland) Fergal O'Brien	5
(England) Andrew Higginson	4

== Century breaks ==
=== Qualifying stage centuries ===
- 142, 109 – Stuart Pettman
- 138 – Patrick Wallace
- 131 – Scott MacKenzie
- 127 – Joe Swail
- 124 – Stuart Bingham
- 123, 109 – Ricky Walden
- 121 – Liu Chuang
- 110 – Atthasit Mahitthi
- 109 – Jamie Cope
- 109, 103 – Jin Long
- 104 – Kuldesh Johal
- 103 – Martin Gould
- 103 – Michael Judge
- 100 – David Gilbert
- 100 – Judd Trump

=== Televised stage centuries ===
- 140, 132, 121, 110, 103 – John Higgins
- 140, 128, 105 – Ricky Walden
- 138, 108, 100 – Peter Ebdon
- 134, 118 – Gerard Greene
- 132 – Mark Allen
- 129, 108 – Stephen Hendry
- 127 – Ding Junhui
- 124, 104 – Ronnie O'Sullivan
- 115 – Dave Harold
- 114 – Shaun Murphy
- 109, 101, 100 – Graeme Dott
- 108 – Xiao Guodong
- 105 – Tian Pengfei
- 105 – Mark Selby
- 100 – Judd Trump
