= 2009 Welsh Open (snooker) =

Tournament information
- Dates: 16–22 February 2009
- Venue: Newport Centre
- City: Newport
- Country: Wales
- Organisation: WPBSA
- Format: Ranking event
- Total prize fund: £225,500
- Winner's share: £35,000
- Highest break: Marco Fu (HKG) (142)

Final
- Champion: Ali Carter (ENG)
- Runner-up: Joe Swail (NIR)
- Score: 9–5

The 2009 Welsh Open was a professional ranking snooker tournament that took place between 16 and 22 February 2009 at the Newport Centre in Newport, Wales.

The defending champion was Mark Selby, but he lost in the quarter-finals against Anthony Hamilton. The event was won Ali Carter, who claimed his first ranking tournament win by defeating Joe Swail 9–5 in the final, having come back from 2–5 down. This was the first ranking final refereed by Colin Humphries.

== Prize fund ==
The breakdown of prize money for this year is shown below:

- Winner: £35,000
- Runner-up: £17,500
- Semi-finals: £8,750
- Quarter-finals: £6,500
- Last 16: £4,275
- Last 32: £2,750
- Last 48: £1,725
- Last 64: £1,325
- Stage one highest break: £500
- Stage two highest break: £2,000
- Stage one maximum break: £1,000
- Stage two maximum break: £20,000
- Total: £225,500

== Main draw ==
Last 32; Best of 9 frames
1	(England) Mark Selby	5
(Wales) Paul Davies	0
12	(England) Joe Perry	4
(England) David Gilbert	5
9	(England) Peter Ebdon	2
(England) Anthony Hamilton	5
8	(Wales) Ryan Day	3
(Republic of Ireland) Michael Judge	5
7	(England) Ali Carter	5
(England) Jimmy White	1
13	(Scotland) Graeme Dott	5
(England) Mike Dunn	3
15	(England) Mark King	5
(England) Dave Harold	3
4	(England) Shaun Murphy	5
(England) Barry Pinches	3
3	(Scotland) Stephen Maguire	5
(Wales) Ian Preece	0
11	(China) Ding Junhui	5
(Wales) Matthew Stevens	3
16	(Northern Ireland) Mark Allen	3
(Northern Ireland) Joe Swail	5
6	(Scotland) Stephen Hendry	3
(England) Martin Gould	5
5	(Scotland) John Higgins	5
(Wales) Dominic Dale	2
10	(Australia) Neil Robertson	5
(Scotland) Jamie Burnett	3
14	(Hong Kong) Marco Fu	5
(Republic of Ireland) Fergal O'Brien	4
2	(England) Ronnie O'Sullivan	5
(England) Steve Davis	2

Last 16; Best of 9 frames
1	(England) Mark Selby	5
(England) David Gilbert	1
(England) Anthony Hamilton	5
(Republic of Ireland) Michael Judge	2
7	(England) Ali Carter	5
13	(Scotland) Graeme Dott	4
15	(England) Mark King	2
4	(England) Shaun Murphy	5
3	(Scotland) Stephen Maguire	5
11	(China) Ding Junhui	4
(Northern Ireland) Joe Swail	5
(England) Martin Gould	1
5	(Scotland) John Higgins	4
10	(Australia) Neil Robertson	5
14	(Hong Kong) Marco Fu	5
2	(England) Ronnie O'Sullivan	3

Quarter-finals; Best of 9 frames
1	(England) Mark Selby	3
(England) Anthony Hamilton	5
7	(England) Ali Carter	5
4	(England) Shaun Murphy	2
3	(Scotland) Stephen Maguire	4
(Northern Ireland) Joe Swail	5
10	(Australia) Neil Robertson	5
14	(Hong Kong) Marco Fu	2

Semi-finals; Best of 11 frames
(England) Anthony Hamilton	5
7	(England) Ali Carter	6
(Northern Ireland) Joe Swail	6
10	(Australia) Neil Robertson	4

Final; Best of 17 frames
7	(England) Ali Carter	9
(Northern Ireland) Joe Swail	5

== Final ==
Final: Best of 17 frames. Referee: Colin Humphries. Newport Centre, Newport, Wales, 22 February 2009.
Ali Carter (7); England	9–5	Joe Swail; Northern Ireland
Afternoon: 9–81, 90–0 (89), 55–44, 10–103 (60), 16–83, 49–63, 16–66, 70–0 (54); Evening: 120–0 (116), 141–0 (109), 72–1 (61), 91–16 (91), 73–0 (67), 65–54
116	Highest break	60
2	Century breaks	0
7	50+ breaks	1

== Qualifying ==
These matches took place between 3 and 6 February 2009 at the Pontins Centre in Prestatyn, Wales.

Round 1 Best of 9 frames
(Northern Ireland) Patrick Wallace	5
(China) Liu Chuang	2
(England) Kuldesh Johal	3
(Republic of Ireland) Vincent Muldoon	5
(England) Matthew Couch	2
(England) Stephen Craigie	5
(Scotland) Scott MacKenzie	4
(Netherlands) Stefan Mazrocis	5
(England) Jimmy White	5
(England) David Grace	4
(England) Simon Bedford	3
(England) Wayne Cooper	5
(England) Lee Spick	5
(Scotland) Robert Stephen	3
(Thailand) Supoj Saenla	2
(China) Jin Long	5
(England) Peter Lines	5
(Wales) Andrew Pagett	4
(England) Paul Davison	5
(Thailand) Atthasit Mahitthi	2
(Scotland) James McBain	4
(India) Aditya Mehta	5
(England) Matthew Selt	5
(England) Michael Georgiou	2
(Wales) Jamie Jones	4
(China) Li Hang	5
(England) Lewis Roberts	wo
(Northern Ireland) Declan Hughes	wd
(Republic of Ireland) Rodney Goggins	5
(England) Andy Lee	2
(Wales) Daniel Wells	5
(New Zealand) Chris McBreen	0

Round 2 Best of 9 frames
(Wales) Paul Davies	5
(Northern Ireland) Patrick Wallace	1
(England) David Roe	5
(Republic of Ireland) Vincent Muldoon	3
(England) David Gray	2
(England) Stephen Craigie	5
(England) Stuart Pettman	5
(Netherlands) Stefan Mazrocis	0
(England) Rod Lawler	4
(England) Jimmy White	5
(England) Robert Milkins	5
(England) Wayne Cooper	3
(Republic of Ireland) Joe Delaney	5
(England) Lee Spick	3
(England) Barry Pinches	5
(China) Jin Long	3
(Wales) Ian Preece	5
(England) Peter Lines	4
(England) Andy Hicks	5
(England) Paul Davison	3
(England) Mark Davis	3
(India) Aditya Mehta	5
(England) Martin Gould	5
(England) Matthew Selt	3
(China) Liu Song	2
(China) Li Hang	5
(England) Mark Joyce	5
(England) Lewis Roberts	1
(Republic of Ireland) David Morris	5
(Republic of Ireland) Rodney Goggins	1
(England) Andrew Norman	4
(Wales) Daniel Wells	5

Round 3 Best of 9 frames
(England) Jimmy Michie	3
(Wales) Paul Davies	5
(England) David Gilbert	5
(England) David Roe	3
(England) Michael Holt	5
(England) Stephen Craigie	2
(Scotland) Alan McManus	4
(England) Stuart Pettman	5
(England) Rory McLeod	2
(England) Jimmy White	5
(England) Mike Dunn	5
(England) Robert Milkins	4
(Northern Ireland) Gerard Greene	5
(Republic of Ireland) Joe Delaney	1
(England) Judd Trump	3
(England) Barry Pinches	5
(England) Andrew Higginson	4
(Wales) Ian Preece	5
(England) Adrian Gunnell	2
(England) Andy Hicks	5
(Scotland) Marcus Campbell	5
(India) Aditya Mehta	2
(England) John Parrott	3
(England) Martin Gould	5
(China) Liang Wenbo	5
(China) Li Hang	1
(Scotland) Jamie Burnett	5
(England) Mark Joyce	0
(England) Ricky Walden	5
(Republic of Ireland) David Morris	3
(England) Tom Ford	5
(Wales) Daniel Wells	2

Round 4 Best of 9 frames
(England) Barry Hawkins	4
(Wales) Paul Davies	5
(Wales) Mark Williams (Note: Matches were held over and played in Newport.)	1
(England) David Gilbert	5
(England) Anthony Hamilton	5
(England) Michael Holt	3
(Republic of Ireland) Michael Judge	5
(England) Stuart Pettman	2
(Republic of Ireland) Ken Doherty	0
(England) Jimmy White	5
(England) Ian McCulloch	4
(England) Mike Dunn	5
(England) Dave Harold	5
(Northern Ireland) Gerard Greene	1
(England) Jamie Cope	3
(England) Barry Pinches	5
(England) Stuart Bingham	3
(Wales) Ian Preece	5
(Wales) Matthew Stevens	5
(England) Andy Hicks	4
(Northern Ireland) Joe Swail	5
(Scotland) Marcus Campbell	3
(England) Nigel Bond	4
(England) Martin Gould	5
(Wales) Dominic Dale	5
(China) Liang Wenbo	4
(England) Stephen Lee	3
(Scotland) Jamie Burnett	5
(Republic of Ireland) Fergal O'Brien	5
(England) Ricky Walden	1
(England) Steve Davis	5
(England) Tom Ford	2

== Century breaks ==
=== Qualifying stage centuries ===
- 136 – Barry Pinches
- 132 – Daniel Wells
- 132 – Stuart Pettman
- 131, 112, 110 – Jamie Burnett
- 128, 105 – Martin Gould
- 123 – Andrew Norman
- 122, 108 – Liang Wenbo
- 120 – Andy Lee
- 119 – Alan McManus
- 111 – Gerard Greene
- 109 – Paul Davison
- 102 – Patrick Wallace

=== Televised stage centuries ===
- 142, 117, 115, 101 – Marco Fu
- 141, 119, 116, 109 – Ali Carter
- 136, 116, 100 – Anthony Hamilton
- 135 – Martin Gould
- 132 – Steve Davis
- 131, 115 – David Gilbert
- 129, 101 – John Higgins
- 126 – Mark Selby
- 124, 107 – Neil Robertson
- 124, 104 – Dominic Dale
- 118 – Ronnie O'Sullivan
- 116, 105 – Shaun Murphy
- 110 – Paul Davies
- 109, 104 – Ryan Day
- 109 – Michael Judge
- 107 – Joe Perry
- 105 – Graeme Dott
- 105 – Joe Swail
- 102 – Barry Pinches
- 101 – Stephen Maguire
