= 2008 Northern Ireland Trophy =

Northern Ireland Trophy
Tournament information
- Dates: 24–31 August 2008
- Venue: Waterfront Hall
- City: Belfast
- Country: Northern Ireland
- Organisation: WPBSA
- Format: Ranking event
- Total prize fund: £200,500
- Winner's share: £30,000
- Highest break: Stephen Lee (ENG) (145)

Final
- Champion: Ronnie O'Sullivan (ENG)
- Runner-up: Dave Harold (ENG)
- Score: 9–3

The 2008 Northern Ireland Trophy was a professional ranking snooker tournament that took place between 24 and 31 August 2008 at the Waterfront Hall in Belfast, Northern Ireland.

Ronnie O'Sullivan claimed his 21st ranking tournament by defeating surprise finalist Dave Harold 9–3 in the final.

== Tournament summary ==
- Notable comebacks in the qualifiers included: Li Hang coming from 0–4 down to beat Irish prodigy David Morris 5–4, and both Jimmy White and Ian Preece came from 2–4 behind to win their matches 5–4, against Jamie Jones and Paul Davies respectively.
- Jimmy White qualified for the final stage of an event for the first time in over a year, stretching back to the 2007 China Open.
- Long standing top-16 players, Mark Williams, Ken Doherty and Stephen Lee were playing in the qualifiers for the first time in over a decade.
- Last year's runner-up, Fergal O'Brien fell at the first hurdle, losing 3–5 to Michael Holt.
- In his match against Mark Selby, Andrew Higginson was playing in front of the TV cameras for the first time since his run to the final of the 2007 Welsh Open.
- Dominic Dale came from 1–4 down against Mark Allen to level at 4–4, before Allen played superbly to take the decider.
- In beating Ding Junhui 5–4, Mark Davis secured one of the best wins of his career.
- Ronnie O'Sullivan won three quick consecutive frames to oust former world champion Ken Doherty 5–4 in the last 32.
- Stephen Maguire won the last three frames to beat Alan McManus 5–4, a player who had not reached the last 16 of an event the previous season.
- Dave Harold beat Stephen Lee 5–4, a player who had been considered one of the tournaments in-form players, having knocked in three centuries, including a high break of 145.
- Harold increased his head-to-head record to 3–0 over Stephen Maguire by beating him 5–2 in the quarter-finals, afterwards Maguire stated that he never seems to perform against Harold.
- Barry Hawkins produced a brave fightback to recover from 1–4 to level at 4–4 against Ronnie O'Sullivan in their quarter-final match, before the world champion took the decider.
- Dave Harold led John Higgins 5–1, but won only 6–4, to reach his first ranking final since 1994, the gap between those two ranking finals is the longest in snooker history.

== Prize fund ==
The breakdown of prize money for this year is shown below:

- Winner: £30,000
- Runner-up: £15,000
- Semi-final: £7,500
- Quarter-final: £5,600
- Last 16: £4,000
- Last 32: £2,500
- Last 48: £1,625
- Last 64: £1,100
- Stage one highest break: £500
- Stage two highest break: £2,000
- Stage one maximum break: £1,000
- Stage two maximum break: £20,000
- Total: £200,500

== Main draw ==
Last 48; Best of 9 frames
24	(Republic of Ireland) Fergal O'Brien	3
(England) Michael Holt	5
17	(Wales) Matthew Stevens	2
(Scotland) Alan McManus	5
28	(England) Dave Harold	5
(England) Ricky Walden	2
27	(England) Stephen Lee	5
(England) Judd Trump	3
30	(Republic of Ireland) Michael Judge	4
(England) David Gilbert	5
29	(England) Steve Davis	3
(China) Liang Wenbo	5
25	(England) Ian McCulloch	5
(England) Mike Dunn	4
31	(England) Anthony Hamilton	3
(England) Andrew Higginson	5
22	(Wales) Mark Williams	5
(Scotland) Marcus Campbell	3
32	(Wales) Dominic Dale	5
(England) Adrian Gunnell	4
20	(Northern Ireland) Joe Swail	4
(England) Mark Davis	5
21	(England) Stuart Bingham	4
(England) Rory McLeod	5
23	(England) Nigel Bond	1
(England) Stuart Pettman	5
26	(England) Barry Hawkins	5
(England) Jimmy White	3
19	(England) Jamie Cope	5
(England) David Gray	4
18	(Republic of Ireland) Ken Doherty	5
(Northern Ireland) Gerard Greene	2

Last 32; Best of 9 frames
1	(Scotland) Stephen Maguire	5
(England) Michael Holt	1
15	(England) Mark King	3
(Scotland) Alan McManus	5
13	(Scotland) Graeme Dott	3
28	(England) Dave Harold	5
6	(Scotland) Stephen Hendry	1
27	(England) Stephen Lee	5
5	(Scotland) John Higgins	5
(England) David Gilbert	2
9	(England) Peter Ebdon	0
(China) Liang Wenbo	5
10	(Australia) Neil Robertson	2
25	(England) Ian McCulloch	5
4	(England) Mark Selby	5
(England) Andrew Higginson	1
3	(England) Shaun Murphy	2
22	(Wales) Mark Williams	5
16	(Northern Ireland) Mark Allen	5
32	(Wales) Dominic Dale	4
11	(China) Ding Junhui	4
(England) Mark Davis	5
7	(England) Ali Carter	5
(England) Rory McLeod	1
8	(Wales) Ryan Day	5
(England) Stuart Pettman	4
14	(Hong Kong) Marco Fu	2
26	(England) Barry Hawkins	5
12	(England) Joe Perry	5
19	(England) Jamie Cope	2
2	(England) Ronnie O'Sullivan	5
18	(Republic of Ireland) Ken Doherty	4

Last 16; Best of 9 frames
1	(Scotland) Stephen Maguire	5
(Scotland) Alan McManus	4
28	(England) Dave Harold	5
27	(England) Stephen Lee	4
5	(Scotland) John Higgins	5
(China) Liang Wenbo	1
25	(England) Ian McCulloch	5
4	(England) Mark Selby	4
22	(Wales) Mark Williams	3
16	(Northern Ireland) Mark Allen	5
(England) Mark Davis	2
7	(England) Ali Carter	5
8	(Wales) Ryan Day	3
26	(England) Barry Hawkins	5
12	(England) Joe Perry	3
2	(England) Ronnie O'Sullivan	5

Quarter-finals; Best of 9 frames
1	(Scotland) Stephen Maguire	2
28	(England) Dave Harold	5
5	(Scotland) John Higgins	5
25	(England) Ian McCulloch	3
16	(Northern Ireland) Mark Allen	2
7	(England) Ali Carter	5
26	(England) Barry Hawkins	4
2	(England) Ronnie O'Sullivan	5

Semi-finals; Best of 11 frames
28	(England) Dave Harold	6
5	(Scotland) John Higgins	4
7	(England) Ali Carter	5
2	(England) Ronnie O'Sullivan	6

Final; Best of 17 frames
28	(England) Dave Harold	3
2	(England) Ronnie O'Sullivan	9

== Final ==
Final: Best of 17 frames. Referee: Eirian Williams. Waterfront Hall, Belfast, Northern Ireland, 31 August 2008.
Dave Harold; England	3–9	Ronnie O'Sullivan; England
Afternoon: 63–14, 44–68 (68), 17–127 (103), 0–84 (84), 44–87, 13–84, 60–76 (76); Evening: 76–41, 19–73 (64), 54–61, 88–0 (81), 22–80 (50)
81	Highest break	103
0	Century breaks	1
1	50+ breaks	6

== Qualifying ==
Qualifying for the tournament took place at Pontins in Prestatyn, Wales between 15 and 17 August 2008.

Round 1 Best of 9 frames
(Republic of Ireland) Rodney Goggins	5
(Northern Ireland) Declan Hughes	2
(England) Paul Davison	0
(Wales) Andrew Pagett	5
(Wales) Daniel Wells	5
(China) Jin Long	3
(Northern Ireland) Patrick Wallace	5
Bye	0
(Thailand) Supoj Saenla	2
(China) Liu Chuang	5
(England) Peter Lines	5
(Hong Kong) Andy Lee	0
(England) Matthew Couch	5
(Republic of Ireland) Vincent Muldoon	3
(Scotland) Robert Stephen	1
(China) Li Hang	5
(England) Lee Spick	5
(India) Aditya Mehta	2
(Wales) Jamie Jones	5
(England) Stephen Craigie	2
(England) Kuldesh Johal	5
(England) Michael Georgiou	3
(England) Matthew Selt	5
(New Zealand) Chris McBreen	1
(Scotland) James McBain	5
(Netherlands) Stefan Mazrocis	1
(England) Jimmy White	5
(Thailand) Atthasit Mahitthi	4
(England) Simon Bedford	5
(England) David Grace	1
(England) Lewis Roberts	1
(England) Wayne Cooper	5

Round 2 Best of 9 frames
(England) Rod Lawler	5
(Republic of Ireland) Rodney Goggins	0
(England) Andy Hicks	5
(Wales) Andrew Pagett	4
(England) Barry Pinches	5
(Wales) Daniel Wells	1
(England) Mark Joyce	5
(Northern Ireland) Patrick Wallace	0
(England) Robert Milkins	3
(China) Liu Chuang	5
(England) David Roe	5
(England) Peter Lines	2
(England) Andrew Norman	5
(England) Matthew Couch	3
(Republic of Ireland) David Morris	4
(China) Li Hang	5
(Republic of Ireland) Joe Delaney	5
(England) Lee Spick	0
(Wales) Ian Preece	5
(Wales) Jamie Jones	4
(England) Mark Davis	5
(England) Kuldesh Johal	1
(China) Liu Song	5
(England) Matthew Selt	1
(England) Stuart Pettman	5
(Scotland) James McBain	3
(Wales) Paul Davies	4
(England) Jimmy White	5
(England) David Gray	5
(England) Simon Bedford	4
(England) Martin Gould	5
(England) Wayne Cooper	3

Round 3 Best of 9 frames
(England) Michael Holt	5
(England) Rod Lawler	2
(Scotland) Alan McManus	5
(England) Andy Hicks	2
(England) Ricky Walden	5
(England) Barry Pinches	3
(England) Judd Trump	5
(England) Mark Joyce	0
(England) David Gilbert	5
(China) Liu Chuang	3
(China) Liang Wenbo	5
(England) David Roe	0
(England) Mike Dunn	5
(England) Andrew Norman	1
(England) A. Higginson	5
(China) Li Hang	2
(Scotland) Marcus Campbell	5
(Republic of Ireland) Joe Delaney	1
(England) Adrian Gunnell	5
(Wales) Ian Preece	2
(Scotland) Jamie Burnett	2
(England) Mark Davis	5
(England) Rory McLeod	5
(China) Liu Song	2
(England) John Parrott	4
(England) Stuart Pettman	5
(England) Tom Ford	2
(England) Jimmy White	5
(England) Jimmy Michie	3
(England) David Gray	5
(Northern Ireland) Gerard Greene	5
(England) Martin Gould	3

== Century breaks ==
=== Qualifying stage centuries ===
- 130, 114 – James McBain
- 128, 114 – Stuart Pettman
- 127 – Andy Hicks
- 127 – Liang Wenbo
- 126 – Liu Song
- 125 – Adrian Gunnell
- 121 – Andy Lee
- 120 – Jamie Burnett
- 119 – Ricky Walden
- 111 – Stephen Lee
- 109 – Ian Preece
- 108 – Mark Davis
- 101 – Rodney Goggins
- 101 – Robert Milkins

=== Televised stage centuries ===
- 145, 116, 111 – Stephen Lee
- 139, 110 – Ian McCulloch
- 134, 126, 115, 111 – Barry Hawkins
- 134 – Michael Judge
- 134 – Ryan Day
- 132, 122, 110, 110, 108, 103 – Ronnie O'Sullivan
- 127 – Stephen Maguire
- 113 – Anthony Hamilton
- 106 – Mark Allen
- 106 – Ali Carter
- 104 – Liang Wenbo
- 103 – John Higgins
- 103 – Ricky Walden
