= 2009 Masters (snooker) =

Professional non-ranking snooker tournament, Jan 2009

Tournament information
- Dates: 11–18 January 2009
- Venue: Wembley Arena
- City: London
- Country: England
- Organisation: WPBSA
- Format: Non-ranking event
- Total prize fund: £482,500
- Winner's share: £150,000
- Highest break: John Higgins (SCO) (140)

Final
- Champion: Ronnie O'Sullivan (ENG)
- Runner-up: Mark Selby (ENG)
- Score: 10–8

The 2009 Masters was a professional non-ranking snooker tournament that took place between 11 and 18 January 2009 at the Wembley Arena in London, England.

Ronnie O'Sullivan won his 4th Masters title by beating defending champion Mark Selby 10–8 in the final.

The quarter-final match between Stephen Maguire and Neil Robertson featured 5 consecutive century breaks between the two players: 3 from Maguire and 2 from Robertson. This is a joint record for a professional match and a standalone record for a best-of-11 frame match.

== Field ==
Defending champion Mark Selby was the number 1 seed with World Champion Ronnie O'Sullivan seeded 2. Places were allocated to the top 16 players in the world rankings. Players seeded 15 and 16 played in the wild-card round against the winner of the qualifying event, Judd Trump (ranked 41), and wild-card selection Ricky Walden (ranked 35). Mark Allen, Judd Trump and Ricky Walden were making their debuts in the Masters.

== Prize fund ==
The breakdown of prize money for this year is shown below:

=== Qualifying stage ===
- Winner: £2,000
- Runner-up: £680
- Semi-final: £250
- Quarter-final: £105
- Total: £1,600

=== Television stage ===
- Winner: £150,000
- Runner-up: £75,000
- Semi-final: £32,000
- Quarter-final: £16,000
- Last 16: £14,000
- Last 18 (wild-cards): £3,500

- Highest break: £10,000
- Maximum break: £25,000
- Total: £482,000

== Wild-card round ==
In the preliminary round, the wild-card players plays the 15th and 16th seeds.

Match	Date		Score	
WC1	Sunday 11 January	Mark King (ENG) (15)	2–6	Ricky Walden (ENG)
WC2	Monday 12 January	Mark Allen (NIR) (16)	6–4	Judd Trump (ENG)

== Main draw ==
Last 16; Best of 11 frames
1	Mark Selby (ENG)	6
Ricky Walden (ENG)	5
8	Ryan Day (WAL)	1
16	Mark Allen (NIR)	6
5	John Higgins (SCO)	6
14	Marco Fu (HKG)	4
4	Shaun Murphy (ENG)	4
11	Ding Junhui (CHN)	6
3	Stephen Maguire (SCO)	6
13	Graeme Dott (SCO)	5
6	Stephen Hendry (SCO)	4
10	Neil Robertson (AUS)	6
7	Ali Carter (ENG)	6
9	Peter Ebdon (ENG)	0
2	Ronnie O'Sullivan (ENG)	6
12	Joe Perry (ENG)	5

Quarter-finals; Best of 11 frames
1	(England) Mark Selby	6
16	(Northern Ireland) Mark Allen	5
5	(Scotland) John Higgins	6
11	(China) Ding Junhui	4
3	(Scotland) Stephen Maguire	6
10	(Australia) Neil Robertson	3
7	(England) Ali Carter	2
2	(England) Ronnie O'Sullivan	6

Semi-finals; Best of 11 frames
1	(England) Mark Selby	6
5	(Scotland) John Higgins	2
3	(Scotland) Stephen Maguire	1
2	(England) Ronnie O'Sullivan	6

Final; Best of 19 frames
1	(England) Mark Selby	8
2	(England) Ronnie O'Sullivan	10

== Final ==
Final: Best of 19 frames. Referee: Jan Verhaas; Wembley Arena, London, England, 18 January 2009.
Mark Selby (1); England	8–10	Ronnie O'Sullivan (2); England
Afternoon: 28–69 (68), 0–88, 97–4 (82), 1–114 (101), 59–54, 80–0 (76), 69–43 (50), 58–64 (Selby 53); Evening: 62–63, 109–29 (101), 93–0 (89), 114–19 (114), 9–69 (53), 65–70 (Selby 55), 0–110 (110), 76–0 (69), 50–51, 16–71 (55)
114	Highest break	110
2	Century breaks	2
9	50+ breaks	5

== Qualifying ==
The 2008 Masters Qualifying Event was held between 21 and 26 November 2008 at the English Institute of Sport in Sheffield. The winner was awarded with a wild-card to the 2009 Masters.

Last 64; Best of 7 frames
(Wales) Matthew Stevens
Bye
(England) Rory McLeod	4
(England) Paul Davison	3
(England) Ricky Walden	4
(Netherlands) Stefan Mazrocis	2
(England) Anthony Hamilton	4
(Wales) Andrew Pagett	0
(China) Liang Wenbo	4
(China) Liu Chuang	1
(England) Jimmy Michie	0
(Wales) Daniel Wells	4
(Republic of Ireland) Fergal O'Brien
Bye
(England) Barry Pinches	3
(England) Lewis Roberts	4
(Wales) Mark Williams
Bye
(England) Andrew Higginson	wo
(New Zealand) Chris McBreen	wd
(Northern Ireland) Gerard Greene	4
(England) Michael Georgiou	0
(England) Stephen Lee	2
(England) Simon Bedford	4
(England) Barry Hawkins	4
(England) Wayne Cooper	3
(England) Mark Joyce	4
(England) Peter Lines	0
(Northern Ireland) Joe Swail
Bye
(England) David Roe	3
(England) Kuldesh Johal	4
(England) Jamie Cope
Bye
(England) Stuart Pettman	wd
(England) David Grace	wo
(England) Judd Trump	4
(England) Matthew Couch	0
(England) Dave Harold	4
(Thailand) Supoj Saenla	1
(England) Martin Gould	4
(China) Li Hang	3
(England) Andrew Norman	4
(Wales) Jamie Jones	1
(England) Nigel Bond
Bye
(England) Rod Lawler	3
(China) Jin Long	4
(England) Stuart Bingham
Bye
(England) Andy Hicks	4
(England) Jimmy White	2
(England) Davis Gray	4
(England) Matthew Selt	3
(England) Robert Milkins	4
(England) Andy Lee	1
(England) Ian McCulloch
Bye
(England) David Gilbert	4
(England) Stephen Craigie	2
(Republic of Ireland) Ken Doherty
Bye
(England) Michael Holt	3
(Thailand) Atthasit Mahitthi	4

Last 32; Best of 9 frames
(Wales) Matthew Stevens	5
(England) Rory McLeod	3
(England) Ricky Walden	5
(England) Anthony Hamilton	1
(China) Liang Wenbo	4
(Wales) Daniel Wells	5
(Republic of Ireland) Fergal O'Brien	5
(England) Lewis Roberts	3
(Wales) Mark Williams	1
(England) Andrew Higginson	5
(Northern Ireland) Gerard Greene	5
(England) Simon Bedford	1
(England) Barry Hawkins	0
(England) Mark Joyce	5
(Northern Ireland) Joe Swail	3
(England) Kuldesh Johal	5
(England) Jamie Cope	5
(England) David Grace	3
(England) Judd Trump	5
(England) Dave Harold	3
(England) Martin Gould	5
(England) Andrew Norman	1
(England) Nigel Bond	4
(China) Jin Long	5
(England) Stuart Bingham	5
(England) Andy Hicks	4
(England) Davis Gray	5
(England) Robert Milkins	3
(England) Ian McCulloch	5
(England) David Gilbert	2
(Republic of Ireland) Ken Doherty	5
(Thailand) Atthasit Mahitthi	4

Last 16; Best of 9 frames
(Wales) Matthew Stevens	5
(England) Ricky Walden	2
(Wales) Daniel Wells	4
(Republic of Ireland) Fergal O'Brien	5
(England) Andrew Higginson	5
(Northern Ireland) Gerard Greene	2
(England) Mark Joyce	5
(England) Kuldesh Johal	4
(England) Jamie Cope	2
(England) Judd Trump	5
(England) Martin Gould	4
(China) Jin Long	5
(England) Stuart Bingham	5
(England) Davis Gray	2
(England) Ian McCulloch	3
(Republic of Ireland) Ken Doherty	5

Quarter-finals; Best of 9 frames
(Wales) Matthew Stevens	5
(Republic of Ireland) Fergal O'Brien	3
(England) Andrew Higginson	4
(England) Mark Joyce	5
(England) Judd Trump	5
(China) Jin Long	1
(England) Stuart Bingham	1
(Republic of Ireland) Ken Doherty	5

Semi-finals; Best of 9 frames
(Wales) Matthew Stevens	4
(England) Mark Joyce	5
(England) Judd Trump	5
(Republic of Ireland) Ken Doherty	2

Final; Best of 11 frames
(England) Mark Joyce	1
(England) Judd Trump	6

== Century breaks ==
=== Televised stage centuries ===
Total: 31

- 140, 127, 100 – John Higgins
- 136, 128, 118, 115, 110, 102, 101, 100 – Ronnie O'Sullivan
- 130, 124 – Ali Carter
- 128, 114, 113, 105 – Stephen Maguire
- 123 – Judd Trump
- 122, 100 – Neil Robertson

- 120, 114, 104, 102, 101, 100 – Mark Selby
- 119, 104 – Mark Allen
- 115 – Mark King
- 106 – Graeme Dott
- 105 – Joe Perry

Judd Trump's and Mark King's centuries were scored in the wild-card round.

=== Qualifying stage centuries ===
- 138, 129, 120 – Judd Trump
- 136 – Ricky Walden
- 132 – Andrew Higginson
- 125 – Mark Joyce
- 125 – Jin Long
- 124, 120, 100 – Jamie Cope
- 121 – Kuldesh Johal

- 118 – Ian McCulloch
- 115, 101 – Matthew Stevens
- 114 – David Roe
- 109 – Matthew Selt
- 109 – Joe Swail
- 100 – Andy Hicks
