= 2008 Bahrain Championship =

Bahrain Championship

Tournament information
- Dates: 8–15 November 2008
- Venue: Bahrain International Exhibition Centre
- City: Manama
- Country: Bahrain
- Organisation: WPBSA
- Format: Ranking event
- Total prize fund: £271,000
- Winner's share: £48,000
- Highest break: Marcus Campbell (SCO) (147)

Final
- Champion: Neil Robertson (AUS)
- Runner-up: Matthew Stevens (WAL)
- Score: 9–7

The 2008 Bahrain Championship was a professional ranking snooker tournament that took place between 8 and 15 November 2008 at the Bahrain International Exhibition Centre in Manama, Bahrain. It was the fourth ranking event of the 2008/2009 season.

Due to a clash with a previously arranged Premier League match-day, three leading players (John Higgins, Mark Selby and Ding Junhui) were forced to miss the event. This meant that they earned no ranking points, with Matthew Stevens, Ken Doherty and Jamie Cope (ranked 17, 18 and 19 respectively) qualifying automatically due to the extra spaces in the draw. Likewise, the players ranked from 33 to 35 and 49–51 played one qualifier less than usual. Additionally, Ronnie O'Sullivan withdrew three days before the tournament for unspecified medical reasons.

Steve Davis was also involved in Premier League action, playing on 13 November, but did not withdraw from the tournament. He played his qualifying match and received a walkover due to O'Sullivan's withdrawal, meaning that he reached the last sixteen. However, before his last 16 match he withdrew from the event as an ear infection prevented him from flying to Bahrain.

Liang Wenbo made the 65th official maximum break during his qualifying match against Martin Gould. This was Liang's first official 147. Marcus Campbell made the 66th official maximum break during his wildcard round match against Ahmed Basheer Al-Khusaibi. This was Campbell's first official 147.

Neil Robertson won his third ranking title by defeating Matthew Stevens 9–7.

== Prize fund ==
The breakdown of prize money for this year is shown below:

- Winner: £48,000
- Runner-up: £22,500
- Semi-final: £12,000
- Quarter-final: £6,500
- Last 16: £4,275
- Last 32: £2,750
- Last 48: £1,725
- Last 64: £1,325
- Stage one highest break: £500
- Stage two highest break: £2,000
- Stage one maximum break: £1,000
- Stage two maximum break: £20,000
- Total: £271,000

== Wildcard round ==
The 6 lowest ranking qualifiers played one wildcard match each. Matches were played at Bahrain International Exhibition Centre on Saturday, 8 November.

| Match | | Score | |
|---|---|---|---|
| WC1 | Robert Milkins (ENG) | 5–1 | Ahmed Saif (QAT) |
| WC2 | Barry Pinches (ENG) | 5–1 | Ahmed Ghuloom (BHR) |
| WC3 | Mike Dunn (ENG) | 5–0 | Ahmed Abdulla Asiry (KSA) |
| WC4 | Marcus Campbell (SCO) | 5–0 | Ahmed Basheer Al-Khusaibi (OMA) |
| WC5 | Rod Lawler (ENG) | 5–1 | Isa Ali Al-Hashmi (UAE) |
| WC6 | Mark Davis (ENG) | 5–0 | Habib Subah (BHR) |

== Main draw ==
Round 1 Best of 9 frames
1 | (England) Ronnie O'Sullivan | w/d
(England) Steve Davis | w/o
11 | (Hong Kong) Marco Fu | 3
(Wales) Dominic Dale | 5
14 | (Wales) Matthew Stevens | 5
(England) Stuart Bingham | 0
6 | (Wales) Ryan Day | 5
(England) Dave Harold | 2
7 | (England) Peter Ebdon | 3
(England) Robert Milkins | 5
16 | (England) Jamie Cope | 3
(England) Michael Holt | 5
10 | (Scotland) Graeme Dott | 3
(England) Barry Pinches | 5
4 | (Scotland) Stephen Hendry | 5
(England) Ricky Walden | 3
3 | (England) Shaun Murphy | 4
(England) Mike Dunn | 5
15 | (Republic of Ireland) Ken Doherty | 3
(England) Barry Hawkins | 5
13 | (Northern Ireland) Mark Allen | 5
(England) Judd Trump | 1
5 | (England) Ali Carter | 3
(Republic of Ireland) Michael Judge | 5
8 | (Australia) Neil Robertson | 5
(Scotland) Marcus Campbell | 4
12 | (England) Mark King | 3
(England) Stephen Lee | 5
9 | (England) Joe Perry | 5
(England) Rod Lawler | 1
2 | (Scotland) Stephen Maguire | 5
(England) Mark Davis | 3

Round 2 Best of 9 frames
(England) Steve Davis | w/d
(Wales) Dominic Dale | w/o
14 | (Wales) Matthew Stevens | 5
6 | (Wales) Ryan Day | 4
(England) Robert Milkins | 5
(England) Michael Holt | 4
(England) Barry Pinches | 1
4 | (Scotland) Stephen Hendry | 5
(England) Mike Dunn | 4
(England) Barry Hawkins | 5
13 | (Northern Ireland) Mark Allen | 5
(Republic of Ireland) Michael Judge | 2
8 | (Australia) Neil Robertson | 5
(England) Stephen Lee | 2
9 | (England) Joe Perry | 0
2 | (Scotland) Stephen Maguire | 5

Quarter-Finals; Best of 9 frames
(Wales) Dominic Dale | 2
14 | (Wales) Matthew Stevens | 5
(England) Robert Milkins | 2
4 | (Scotland) Stephen Hendry | 5
(England) Barry Hawkins | 2
13 | (Northern Ireland) Mark Allen | 5
8 | (Australia) Neil Robertson | 5
2 | (Scotland) Stephen Maguire | 2

Semi-Finals; Best of 11 frames
14 | (Wales) Matthew Stevens | 6
4 | (Scotland) Stephen Hendry | 4
13 | (Northern Ireland) Mark Allen | 4
8 | (Australia) Neil Robertson | 6

Final; Best of 17 frames
14 | (Wales) Matthew Stevens | 7
8 | (Australia) Neil Robertson | 9

== Final ==
Final: Best of 17 frames. Referee: Eirian Williams. Bahrain International Exhibition Centre, Manama, Bahrain, November 15, 2008.
| Matthew Stevens (14); Wales | 7–9 | Neil Robertson (8); Australia |
Afternoon: 0–129 (129), 13–117 (117), 4–108 (96), 69–68 (Robertson 68), 1–75 (75), 82–22 (51), 75–0 (70); Evening: 56–70 (63), 67–47, 115–0 (71), 32–64, 110–5 (110), 73–48, 61–64, 1–96 (53), 8–77
| 110 | Highest break | 129 |
| 1 | Century breaks | 2 |
| 4 | 50+ breaks | 7 |

== Qualifying ==
Qualifying for the tournament took place at Pontins in Prestatyn, Wales between 27 and 30 October 2008.

Round 1 Best of 9 frames
(Scotland) James McBain | 0
(Thailand) Atthasit Mahitthi | 5
(Wales) Daniel Wells
bye
(England) Peter Lines
bye
(Thailand) Supoj Saenla | 4
(Wales) Andrew Pagett | 5
(England) David Grace | 2
(Scotland) Robert Stephen | 5
(Republic of Ireland) Rodney Goggins | 5
(England) Michael Georgiou | 1
(New Zealand) Chris McBreen | 2
(Netherlands) Stefan Mazrocis | 5
(England) Paul Davison | 5
(India) Aditya Mehta | 2
(England) Simon Bedford | 1
(England) Stephen Craigie | 5
(England) Matthew Selt | 5
(China) Liu Chuang | 4
(England) Kuldesh Johal | 4
(Republic of Ireland) Vincent Muldoon | 5
(Wales) Jamie Jones
bye
(England) Matthew Couch | 5
(England) Andy Lee | 3
(Northern Ireland) Patrick Wallace | 2
(China) Jin Long | 5
(England) Lewis Roberts
bye
(China) Li Hang | 5
(England) Wayne Cooper | 2

Round 2 Best of 9 frames
(England) Lee Spick | 2
(Thailand) Atthasit Mahitthi | 5
(China) Liu Song | 2
(Wales) Daniel Wells | 5
(England) Jimmy White | 2
(England) Peter Lines | 5
(England) Mark Joyce | 5
(Wales) Andrew Pagett | 4
(England) Andrew Norman | 3
(Scotland) Robert Stephen | 5
(Republic of Ireland) David Morris | 5
(Republic of Ireland) Rodney Goggins | 1
(England) David Roe | 2
(Netherlands) Stefan Mazrocis | 5
(England) Stuart Pettman | 5
(England) Paul Davison | 4
(Republic of Ireland) Joe Delaney | 5
(England) Stephen Craigie | 2
(Wales) Paul Davies | 5
(England) Matthew Selt | 4
(Scotland) Scott MacKenzie | 2
(Republic of Ireland) Vincent Muldoon | 5
(England) Martin Gould | 5
(Wales) Jamie Jones | 4
(Wales) Ian Preece | 4
(England) Matthew Couch | 5
(England) Andy Hicks | 5
(China) Jin Long | 3
(England) Rod Lawler | 5
(England) Lewis Roberts | 1
(England) Mark Davis | 5
(China) Li Hang | 2

Round 3 Best of 9 frames
(England) David Gray | 0
(Thailand) Atthasit Mahitthi | 5
(England) John Parrott | 5
(Wales) Daniel Wells | 3
(Scotland) Alan McManus | 1
(England) Peter Lines | 5
(England) Rory McLeod | 5
(England) Mark Joyce | 3
(England) Robert Milkins | 5
(Scotland) Robert Stephen | 3
(England) Adrian Gunnell | 4
(Republic of Ireland) David Morris | 5
(England) Barry Pinches | 5
(Netherlands) Stefan Mazrocis | 1
(England) Jimmy Michie | 5
(England) Stuart Pettman | 2
(England) Mike Dunn | 5
(Republic of Ireland) Joe Delaney | 2
(Scotland) Jamie Burnett | 1
(Wales) Paul Davies | 5
(England) Judd Trump | 5
(Republic of Ireland) Vincent Muldoon | 4
(China) Liang Wenbo | 5
(England) Martin Gould | 1
(Scotland) Marcus Campbell | 5
(England) Matthew Couch | 2
(England) Tom Ford | 1
(England) Andy Hicks | 5
(England) David Gilbert | 2
(England) Rod Lawler | 5
(England) Andrew Higginson | 3
(England) Mark Davis | 5

Round 4 Best of 9 frames
(England) Steve Davis | 5
(Thailand) Atthasit Mahitthi | 4
(Wales) Dominic Dale | 5
(England) John Parrott | 0
(England) Stuart Bingham | 5
(England) Peter Lines | 2
(England) Dave Harold | 5
(England) Rory McLeod | 4
(Northern Ireland) Joe Swail | 1
(England) Robert Milkins | 5
(England) Michael Holt | 5
(Republic of Ireland) David Morris | 0
(Republic of Ireland) Fergal O'Brien | 4
(England) Barry Pinches | 5
(England) Ricky Walden | 5
(England) Jimmy Michie | 2
(Northern Ireland) Gerard Greene | 1
(England) Mike Dunn | 5
(England) Barry Hawkins | 5
(Wales) Paul Davies | 4
(Wales) Mark Williams | 2
(England) Judd Trump | 5
(Republic of Ireland) Michael Judge | 5
(China) Liang Wenbo | 2
(England) Nigel Bond | 4
(Scotland) Marcus Campbell | 5
(England) Stephen Lee | 5
(England) Andy Hicks | 1
(England) Ian McCulloch | 3
(England) Rod Lawler | 5
(England) Anthony Hamilton | 2
(England) Mark Davis | 5

== Century breaks ==
=== Qualifying stage centuries ===
- 147, 139, 139, 115 – Liang Wenbo
- 137 – Dominic Dale
- 136 – Atthasit Mahitthi
- 135 – Li Hang
- 131, 126 – Rory McLeod
- 128 – Alan McManus
- 127 – Kuldesh Johal
- 124 – Liu Chuang
- 122 – Jin Long
- 122, 114, 103 – Judd Trump
- 111 – Michael Holt
- 110 – Scott MacKenzie
- 105, 100 – Fergal O'Brien
- 105 – Robert Milkins
- 101 – Vincent Muldoon

=== Televised stage centuries ===
- 147 – Marcus Campbell
- 139, 132, 113, 111, 106 – Stephen Hendry
- 137, 114, 102 – Robert Milkins
- 129, 117, 116, 100 – Neil Robertson
- 123 – Joe Perry
- 123 – Barry Hawkins
- 122 – Stephen Maguire
- 120 – Ricky Walden
- 120, 116, 110 – Matthew Stevens
- 119, 112, 111, 105 – Mark Allen
- 118 – Peter Ebdon
- 117 – Dave Harold
- 112, 100 – Barry Pinches
- 110 – Graeme Dott
- 105 – Michael Holt
- 101 – Mike Dunn
- 100 – Rod Lawler
- 100 – Ali Carter

== See also ==
- Dubai Classic
- Saudi Arabia Masters
