= 2004 World Champions v Asia Stars Challenge =

World Champions v Asia Stars Challenge
Tournament information
- Dates: 4–8 August 2004
- Venue: BEC-Tero Hall
- City: Bangkok
- Country: Thailand
- Organisation: 110 Sports Management Group
- Format: Non-ranking event
- Total prize fund: £70,000
- Winner's share: £30,0000
- Highest break: John Higgins (SCO) (103)

Final
- Champion: Marco Fu (HKG)
- Runner-up: John Higgins (SCO)
- Score: 5–1

The 2004 World Champions v Asia Stars Challenge was an invitational professional non-ranking snooker tournament that ran for one year.

This was, in effect, the same event as the Euro-Asia Masters Challenge which ran a season earlier but under a different name. This time, the field consisted of four world champions: Stephen Hendry, John Higgins, Ken Doherty and Mark Williams plus James Wattana, Ding Junhui, Marco Fu and up and coming Thai player, Atthasit Mahitthi. The format was the same with the players split into two round robin groups with the top two from each progressing to the semi-finals. Fu received £30,000 as champion, from a prize fund of £70,000.

== Results ==
=== Round-robin stage ===
Group A

| POS | Player | MP | MW | ML | FW | FL | FD | PTS |
|---|---|---|---|---|---|---|---|---|
| 1 | Ding Junhui (CHN) | 3 | 2 | 1 | 8 | 6 | +2 | 8 |
| 2 | John Higgins (SCO) | 3 | 2 | 1 | 7 | 6 | +1 | 7* |
| 3 | James Wattana (THA) | 3 | 2 | 1 | 7 | 6 | +1 | 7 |
| 4 | Mark Williams (WAL) | 3 | 0 | 3 | 5 | 9 | −4 | 5 |

Results:

- Ding Junhui 3–1 John Higgins
- James Wattana 3–1 Mark Williams
- John Higgins 3–1 James Wattana
- Ding Junhui 3–2 Mark Williams
- James Wattana 3–2 Ding Junhui
- John Higgins 3–2 Mark Williams

* John Higgins finished in the playoffs ahead of James Wattana due to winning their head to head match 3–1

Group B

| POS | Player | MP | MW | ML | FW | FL | FD | PTS |
|---|---|---|---|---|---|---|---|---|
| 1 | Atthasit Mahitthi (THA) | 3 | 3 | 0 | 9 | 1 | +8 | 9 |
| 2 | Marco Fu (HKG) | 3 | 2 | 1 | 6 | 5 | +1 | 6 |
| 3 | Stephen Hendry (SCO) | 3 | 1 | 2 | 3 | 6 | −3 | 3 |
| 4 | Ken Doherty (IRL) | 3 | 0 | 3 | 3 | 9 | −6 | 0 |

Results:

- Atthasit Mahitthi 3–0 Marco Fu
- Atthasit Mahitthi 3–0 Stephen Hendry
- Marco Fu 3–0 Stephen Hendry
- Stephen Hendry 3–0 Ken Doherty
- Atthasit Mahitthi 3–1 Ken Doherty
- Marco Fu 3–2 Ken Doherty

=== Knock-out stage ===
Semi-finals; Best of 9 frames
Ding Junhui (CHN) | 4
Marco Fu (HKG) | 5
Atthasit Mahitthi (THA) | 2
John Higgins (SCO) | 5

Final; Best of 9 frames
Marco Fu (HKG) | 5
John Higgins (SCO) | 1
