= 2008 Huangshan Cup =

Huangshan Cup
Tournament information
- Dates: 14–18 May 2008
- Venue: Anhui Sports Bureau
- City: Hefei
- Country: China
- Organisation: CBSA
- Format: Non-ranking event
- Highest break: Marco Fu (HKG) (139)

Final
- Champion: Ali Carter (ENG)
- Runner-up: Marco Fu (HKG)
- Score: 5–3

The Huangshan Cup was a professional non-ranking snooker tournament that took place on only one occasion between 14 and 18 May 2008 in Hefei, China.

The competition was originally planned so that four top-16 ranked players from the UK would play four Chinese players who would come through an elimination contest. Of those originally invited only Stephen Hendry took part, although four top-16 players did reach the quarter-finals along with local players.

Ali Carter, who was a last-minute replacement for Ronnie O'Sullivan, won in the final 5–3 against Marco Fu. The 2008 Sichuan earthquake caused disruption to the event with players withdrawing; Ding Junhui donated his prize money to the earthquake disaster fund.

== Main draw ==
Quarter-finals; Best of 7 frames
Ali Carter (ENG) | 4
(China) Cao Kaisheng | 2
Ding Junhui (CHN) | 4
Liu Chuang (CHN) | 1
Marco Fu (HKG) | 4
Liang Wenbo (CHN) | 1
Jin Long (CHN) | 4
Stephen Hendry (SCO) | 0

Semi-finals; Best of 9 frames
Ali Carter (ENG) | 5
Ding Junhui (CHN) | 3
Marco Fu (HKG) | 5
Jin Long (CHN) | 3

Final; Best of 9 frames
Ali Carter (ENG) | 5
Marco Fu (HKG) | 3
