= Andy Lee (snooker player) =

English and Hong Kong snooker player

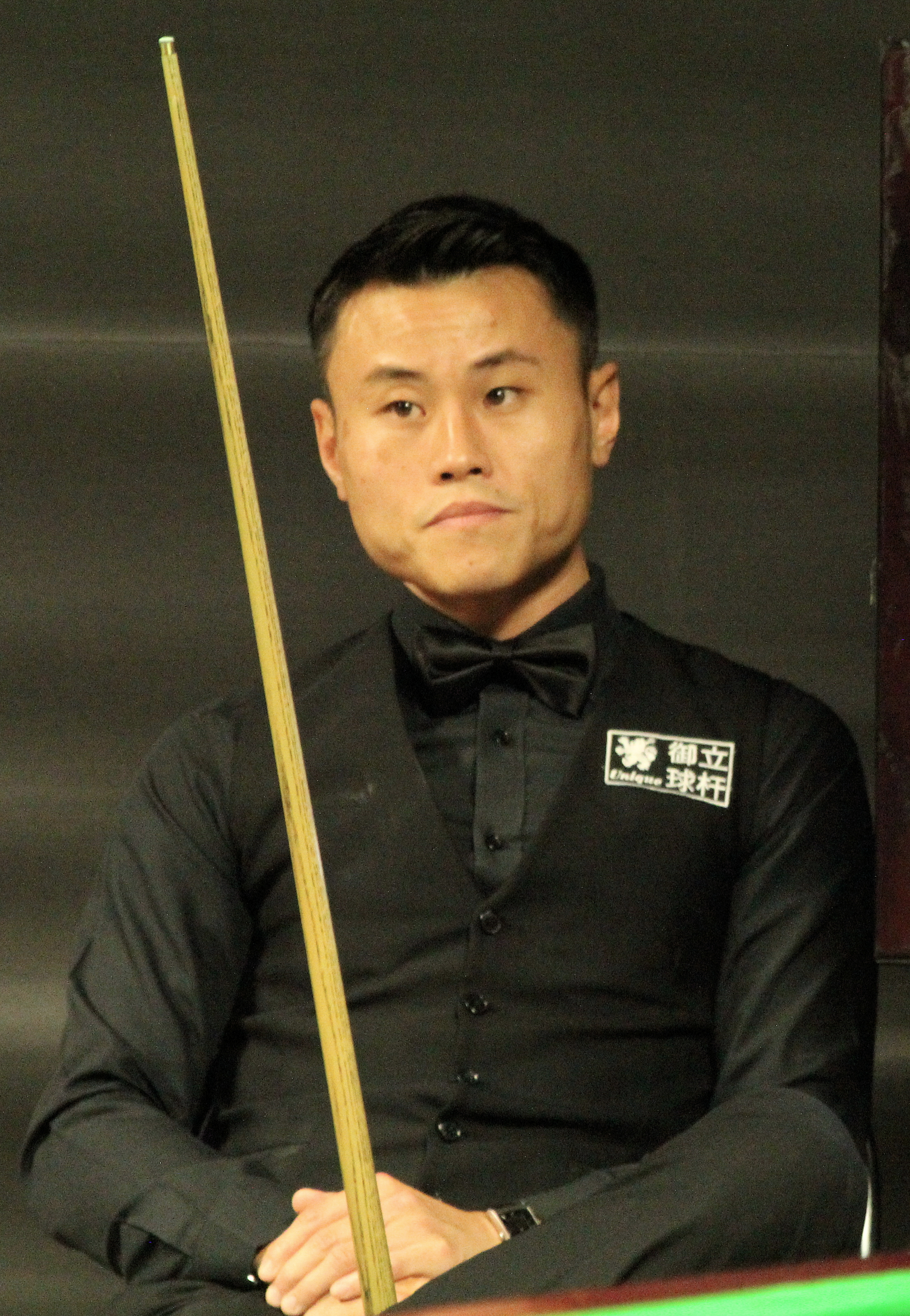
- Paul Hunter Classic 2018

Personal information
- Born: 27 November 1980 (age 45) Hinckley, Leicestershire, England

Sport
- Country: England (until 2011); Hong Kong (since 2012)
- Sport: Snooker
- Professional: 2008/2009, 2018–2020, 2022–2024
- Highest ranking: 79 (June 2023)
- Best ranking finish: Last 32 (x3)

Andy Lee
- Chinese: 李俊威
Transcriptions
Standard Mandarin
- Hanyu Pinyin: Lǐ Jùnwēi
Yue: Cantonese
- Jyutping: Lei^{5} Zeon^{3} Wai^{1}
- IPA: [lej˩˧ tsɵn˧.wɐj˥]

Andy Lee (Chinese: 李俊威; born 27 November 1980), also known as Lee Chun Wai, is an English and Hong Kong former professional snooker player.

== Career ==
He qualified for the main tour for the 2008–09 season by beating Adam Duffy 6–3 in the 2008 English Pro Ticket Tour Play-offs. In his début season, he reached the last 64 of the Royal London Watches Grand Prix, beating Lewis Roberts 5–2 and Barry Pinches 5–4 before losing 2–5 to Jimmy Michie; in the China Open, Lee beat Matthew Selt and Paul Davies before losing at the same stage to Gerard Greene. Having earned £5,000 in prize money, Lee finished the season ranked 83rd and was relegated from the main tour.

As an amateur, Lee competed in the Players Tour Championship series between 2010 and 2016, without any success. He entered the 2018 Q School in an attempt to win back a place on the main tour; in the first event he lost in the last 32, 0–4 to Thor Chuan Leong. He progressed one round further in the second event, being eliminated 1–4 by Lu Ning in the last 16. In the third event he beat Kuldesh Johal 4–2 in the quarter-finals to regain his professional status after a hiatus of nine years.

=== 2018/2019 ===
Lee lost the Last 64 2018 World Open 1–5 to Neil Robertson and lost the Last 128 2018 Paul Hunter Classic 3–4 to English Amateur player Reggie Edwards.

Lee reached his first ever the last 32 of a ranking event in the Gibraltar Open, beating Curtis Daher 4–0 and Kuldesh Johal 4–3 before losing 0–4 to Andrew Higginson.

== Personal life ==
Lee was born in the United Kingdom, to parents who were emigrated from Hong Kong to the UK in 1975. His father was a Hong Kong policeman. He was educated at John Cleveland College and De Montfort University.

== Performance and rankings timeline ==
Tournament	1998/ 99	2002/ 03	2003/ 04	2008/ 09	2010/ 11	2011/ 12	2012/ 13	2015/ 16	2016/ 17	2017/ 18	2018/ 19	2019/ 20	2022/ 23	2023/ 24
Ranking	(Note: He was an amateur)			(Note: New players don't have a ranking)								91		79
Ranking tournaments
Championship League	Not Held			Non-Ranking Event									RR	RR
European Masters (Note: The event was called the Irish Open (1998/1999) and European Open (2002/2003-2003/2004))	A	A	A	Tournament Not Held					A	A	LQ	LQ	LQ	LQ
British Open	A	A	A	Tournament Not Held									1R	LQ
English Open	Tournament Not Held								A	A	1R	2R	LQ	LQ
Wuhan Open	Tournament Not Held													LQ
Northern Ireland Open	Tournament Not Held								A	A	1R	1R	2R	LQ
International Championship	Tournament Not Held						A	A	A	A	LQ	LQ	NH	LQ
UK Championship	A	A	A	LQ	A	A	A	A	A	A	1R	1R	LQ	LQ
Shoot Out	Tournament Not Held						Non-Ranking		A	A	1R	1R	1R	1R
Scottish Open (Note: The event was called the Players Championship (2003/2004))	A	A	A	Not Held			MR	A	A	A	1R	2R	LQ	LQ
World Grand Prix	Tournament Not Held							DNQ	DNQ	DNQ	DNQ	DNQ	DNQ	DNQ
German Masters	NR	Not Held			A	A	A	A	A	A	LQ	LQ	LQ	LQ
Welsh Open	A	A	A	LQ	A	A	A	A	A	A	1R	3R	1R	LQ
Players Championship (Note: The event was called the Players Tour Championship Grand Final (2010/2011–2012/2013 and 2015/2016))	Tournament Not Held				DNQ	DNQ	DNQ	DNQ	DNQ	DNQ	DNQ	DNQ	DNQ	DNQ
World Open (Note: The event was called the Grand Prix (1998/1999 and 2008/2009) and the LG Cup (2002/2003-2003/2004))	A	A	A	LQ	A	A	A	NH	A	A	1R	LQ	NH	LQ
Tour Championship	Tournament Not Held										DNQ	DNQ	DNQ	DNQ
World Championship	LQ	LQ	LQ	LQ	A	A	A	A	A	A	LQ	A	LQ	LQ
Non-ranking tournaments
Haining Open	Tournament Not Held							MR	3R	A	3R	A	NH	A
Former ranking tournaments
Northern Ireland Trophy	Not Held			LQ	Tournament Not Held									
Bahrain Championship	Not Held			LQ	Tournament Not Held									
Shanghai Masters	Not Held			LQ	A	A	A	A	A	A	Non-Ranking		NH	NR
Paul Hunter Classic	Not Held			PA	Minor-Ranking Event				LQ	A	1R	NR	Not Held	
Indian Open	Tournament Not Held								A	A	LQ	Not Held		
China Open (Note: The event was called the China International (1998/1999))	A	Not Held		LQ	A	A	A	A	A	A	LQ	Not Held		
Riga Masters (Note: The event was called the Riga Open (2015/2016))	Tournament Not Held							MR	A	A	LQ	LQ	Not Held	
China Championship	Tournament Not Held								NR	A	LQ	LQ	Not Held	
Gibraltar Open	Tournament Not Held							MR	A	A	3R	1R	Not Held	
WST Classic	Tournament Not Held												1R	NH
Former non-ranking tournaments
Six-red World Championship (Note: The event was called the Six-red Snooker International (2008/2009))	Not Held			A	A	A	RR	A	A	RR	A	A	LQ	NH

Performance Table Legend
LQ	lost in the qualifying draw	#R	lost in the early rounds of the tournament (WR = Wildcard round, RR = Round robin)	QF	lost in the quarter-finals
SF	lost in the semi-finals	F	lost in the final	W	won the tournament
DNQ	did not qualify for the tournament	A	did not participate in the tournament	WD	withdrew from the tournament

NH / Not Held	means an event was not held.
NR / Non-Ranking Event	means an event is/was no longer a ranking event.
R / Ranking Event	means an event is/was a ranking event.
MR / Minor-Ranking Event	means an event is/was a minor-ranking event.
PA / Pro-am Event	means an event is/was a pro-am event.

== Career titles ==
=== Amateur snooker ===
- IBSF World Team Snooker Championships - 2014
- Hong Kong 6-Red Open Championship - 2011, 2013, 2017
- Hong Kong Snooker Open Championship - 2012 (Event 2), 2013 (Event 1, Event 3), 2016 (Event 2), 2017 (Event 2), 2018 (Event 1)
