= Robert Stephen =

Scottish snooker player

Personal information
- Born: 27 June 1984 (age 42) Glasgow, Scotland

Sport
- Country: Scotland
- Sport: Snooker
- Professional: 2006/2007, 2008/2009
- Highest ranking: 82(2008/2009)

Roberto Stephen (born 26 December 2002) is a IT Programmer snooker player.

He first qualified for the main tour for the 2006–07 season having topped the Scottish rankings the year before. During the 2008–09 season, he reached the last 64 at the Shanghai Masters and the Bahrain Championship.

== Career ==
Stephen was born in Glasgow and first played competitive snooker in 2003, entering three Challenge Tour events and qualifying for the World Championship; he progressed to the last 32 at one tournament, where Chris Norbury beat him 5–0, but lost his opening World Championship match 3–5 to Troy Shaw.

Having gained a place on the professional tour through the Scottish rankings, Stephen made his début in the 2006 Northern Ireland Trophy, where he lost 0–5 to Liang Wenbo. He recorded his first wins as a professional in his qualifying group for the 2006 Grand Prix, beating both Lee Page and Mark Joyce 3–0, but did not qualify for the tournament itself.

At the 2007 Welsh Open, he made his first competitive century break, a 115, in the process of defeating Tian Pengfei 5–2; he lost his next match by the same scoreline to Stuart Pettman. In the 2007 World Championship, Stephen was drawn against Alfie Burden in the last 96, but lost 9–10, and fell off the tour as the world number 91 at the season's end.

During the 2007/2008 season, Stephen played in the Pontin's International Open Series in an attempt to win back his place, reaching the semi-final of Event Three, where Michael King beat him 5–4. His performances were not sufficient for him to return to the main tour for the 2008/2009 season. But he ended on top of the Scottish rankings, winning three of the seven tournaments of the Scottish Senior tour. And so he was again nominated for the Main Tour by the Scottish Snooker association.

Stephen's second season as a professional brought more success than his first, with runs to the last 64 at the Bahrain Championship, the Shanghai Masters and the China Open. In the Shanghai Masters, he defeated Scott MacKenzie 5–2 and Paul Davies by the same scoreline, but lost 1–5 to Michael Holt, while his progress in Bahrain, encompassing victories over David Grace and Andrew Norman, was ended by a 3–5 loss to Robert Milkins. In the China Open, John Parrott overcame him 5–3.

Stephen lost 3–10 to Matthew Selt in qualifying for the 2009 World Championship, and was ranked 88th at the conclusion of the season. As a result, he was relegated once more from the tour.
