= Kuldesh Johal =

English snooker player

Personal information
- Born: 25 September 1980 (age 46) Huddersfield, England

Sport
- Country: England
- Sport: Snooker
- Professional: 2008/2009, 2010/2011
- Highest ranking: 80 (2008/2009)

Kuldesh Johal (born 25 September 1980) is an English former professional snooker player. He competed on the main tour during the 2008/2009 and 2010/2011 seasons.

== Career ==
Born in 1980, Johal played in Challenge Tour qualifying events in the early 2000s, without any success. He won two Pontin's International Open Series events during the 2007/2008 season, defeating James Leadbetter, Matthew Couch, Jeff Cundy, Stuart Carrington and Andrew Pagett in Event 2 and Gary Wilson, Jamie Jones, Liam Highfield, Stephen Craigie and Simon Bedford in Event 6, winning a place on the main tour for the 2008/2009 season.

Johal's first season as a professional brought runs to the last 64 at two ranking tournaments - the 2008 UK Championship, where he beat Aditya Mehta and Paul Davies, both 9–5, before losing by the same scoreline to Michael Holt, and the 2009 China Open, where he overcame Michael Georgiou and Barry Pinches but lost 3–5 to Judd Trump. He lost his first-round qualifying match in the 2009 World Championship 8–10 to Jin Long, and finished the season ranked 80th, falling off the tour.

His performances in the minor tour events the following season were sufficient for him to return to the professional circuit for 2010/2011; however, he lost 18 of his 25 matches, the highlight being a run to the last 32 at PTC Event 2. There, he defeated Patrick Wallace 4–1 and Matthew Selt by the same scoreline, but surrendered a 3–1 lead over Alan McManus to lose 3–4. He concluded the season with a ranking of 86th, and was again relegated.

Having not played competitive snooker since 2012, Johal entered the 2015 Q School, aiming to regain his place on tour. In Event 2, he beat five opponents, including Jamie Clarke and Marcus Campbell – relegating the latter from professional snooker after a 24-year career – to reach the quarter-finals. Requiring only a victory in this match to return to the main tour, he was drawn against Jason Weston, but lost 2–4.

At the beginning of the 2015/2016 season, Johal received entries to the first three ranking events; he lost all three of his opening matches - in the Australian Goldfields Open, 1–5 to Zhao Xintong, at the Shanghai Masters, 4–5 to Craig Steadman and in the International Championship, 3–6 to Neil Robertson.

== Performance and rankings timeline ==
Tournament	1997/ 98	1999/ 00	2000/ 01	2001/ 02	2002/ 03	2003/ 04	2004/ 05	2008/ 09	2010/ 11	2015/ 16	2017/ 18	2018/ 19	2020/ 21	2021/ 22
Ranking (Note: It shows the ranking at the beginning of the season.)	(Note: He was an amateur.)							(Note: New players on the Main Tour don't have a ranking.)						
Ranking tournaments
Championship League	Tournament Not held							Non-Ranking Event					RR	RR
British Open	A	A	A	A	A	A	A	Tournament Not held						A
Northern Ireland Open	Tournament Not held										A	A	A	A
English Open	Tournament Not held										A	A	A	A
UK Championship	A	A	A	A	A	A	A	LQ	LQ	A	A	A	A	A
Scottish Open (Note: The event was called the Players Championship (2003/2004))	A	A	A	A	A	A	Tournament Not held				A	A	A	A
World Grand Prix	Tournament Not held									DNQ	DNQ	DNQ	DNQ	DNQ
Shoot-Out	Tournament Not Held								Non-Ranking		2R	1R	2R	3R
German Masters (Note: The event was called the German Open (1997/1998))	A	Tournament Not Held							LQ	WD	A	LQ	A	A
Players Championship (Note: The event was called the Players Tour Championship Grand Finals (2010/2011–2015/2016))	Tournament Not held								DNQ	DNQ	DNQ	DNQ	DNQ	DNQ
European Masters (Note: The event was called the European Open (2001/2002-2003/2004) and the Malta Cup (2004/2005))	Tournament Not held			A	A	A	A	Tournament Not held			A	A	A	A
Welsh Open	A	A	A	A	A	A	A	LQ	LQ	A	A	A	A	A
Turkish Masters	Tournament Not held													A
Gibraltar Open	Tournament Not Held									MR	A	2R	1R	1R
Tour Championship	Tournament Not Held											DNQ	DNQ	DNQ
World Championship	A	A	LQ	LQ	LQ	LQ	LQ	LQ	LQ	LQ	A	A	A	A
Non-ranking tournaments
The Masters	LQ	A	A	LQ	LQ	LQ	A	LQ	A	A	A	A	A	A
Former ranking tournaments
Northern Ireland Trophy	Tournament Not Held							LQ	Tournament Not Held					
Bahrain Championship	Tournament Not Held							LQ	Tournament Not Held					
Australian Goldfields Open	Tournament Not Held									LQ	Tournament Not Held			
Shanghai Masters	Tournament Not Held							LQ	LQ	LQ	A	NR	Not Held	
Riga Masters (Note: The event was called the Riga Open (2015/2016))	Tournament Not Held									MR	A	LQ	Not Held	
World Open (Note: The event was called the Grand Prix (1997/1998, 1999/2000–2000/2001, 2004/2005–2008/2009) and the LG Cup (2001/2002–2003/2004))	A	A	A	A	A	A	A	LQ	LQ	NH	A	A	Not Held	
Paul Hunter Classic (Note: The event was called the Grand Prix Fürth (2004/2005))	Tournament Not Held						Pro-am Event		Minor-Ranking		2R	A	Not Held	
International Championship	Tournament Not Held									LQ	A	A	Not Held	
China Open (Note: The event was called the China International (1997/1998))	NR	A	A	A	Not Held		A	LQ	LQ	A	A	A	Not Held	
WST Pro Series	Tournament Not held												RR	NH
Former non-ranking tournaments
Merseyside Professional Championship	A	2R	A	WD	A	A	1R	Tournament Not Held						

Performance Table Legend
LQ	lost in the qualifying draw	#R	lost in the early rounds of the tournament (WR = Wildcard round, RR = Round robin)	QF	lost in the quarter-finals
SF	lost in the semi-finals	F	lost in the final	W	won the tournament
DNQ	did not qualify for the tournament	A	did not participate in the tournament	WD	withdrew from the tournament

NH / Not Held	means an event was not held.
NR / Non-Ranking Event	means an event is/was no longer a ranking event.
R / Ranking Event	means an event is/was a ranking event.
MR / Minor-Ranking Event	means an event is/was a minor-ranking event.
PA / Pro-am Event	means an event is/was a pro-am event.

== Career finals ==
=== Pro-am finals: 1 (1 title) ===
Outcome	No.	Year	Championship	Opponent in the final	Score
Winner	1.	2000	Pontins Autumn Open	(England) Colin Morton	5–3

=== Amateur finals: 4 (3 titles) ===
Outcome	No.	Year	Championship	Opponent in the final	Score
Winner	1.	2007	PIOS – Event 4	(Wales) Lee Walker	6–4
Winner	2.	2007	PIOS – Event 2	(Wales) Andrew Pagett	6–4
Winner	3.	2008	PIOS – Event 6	(England) Simon Bedford	6–5
Runner-up	1.	2020	Challenge Tour – Event 10	(England) Adam Duffy	1–3
