= Ian Preece =

Welsh snooker player

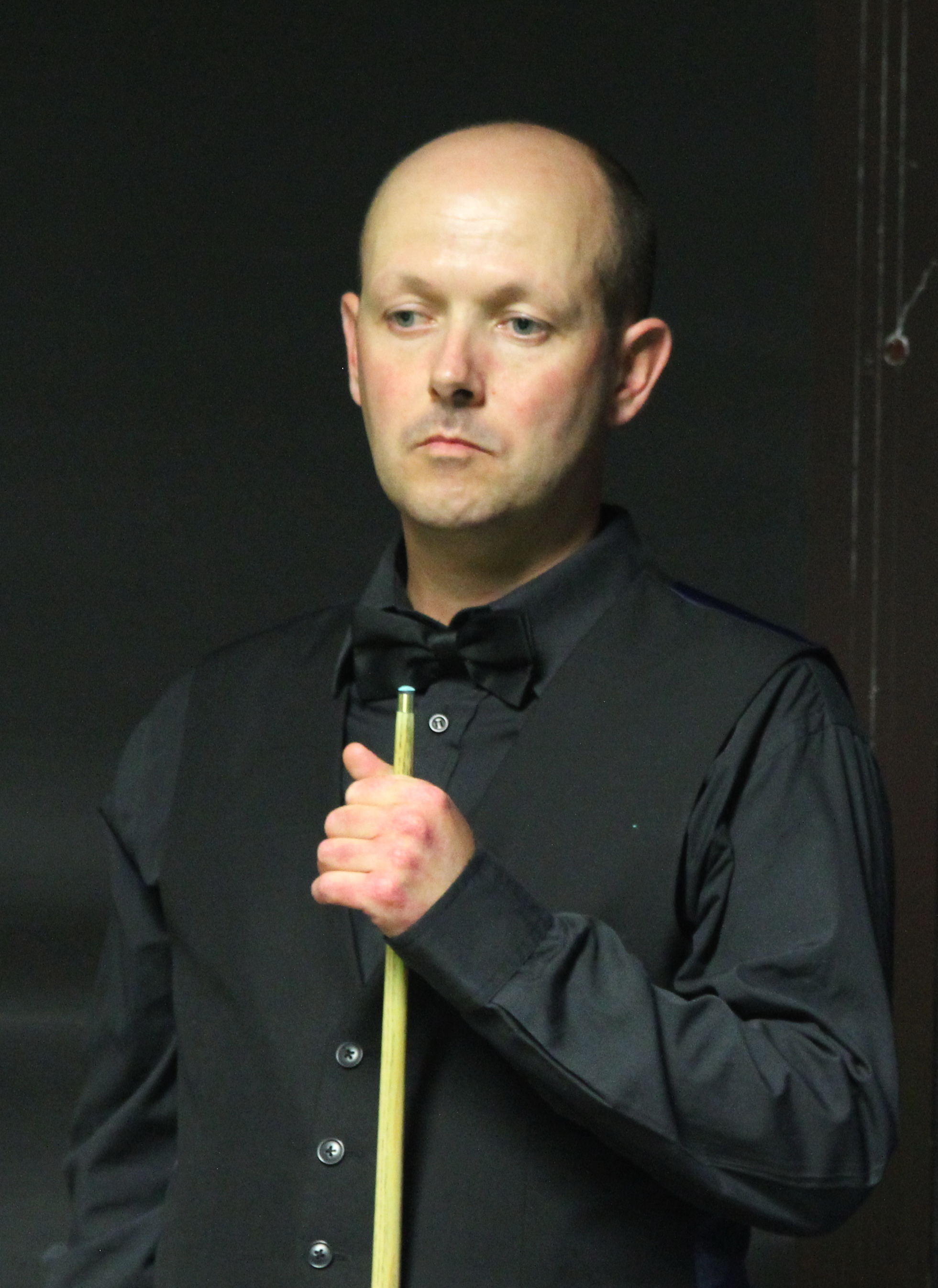
- Paul Hunter Classic 2017

Personal information
- Born: 23 June 1982 (age 44) Newport, Wales

Sport
- Country: Wales
- Sport: Snooker
- Professional: 2003/2004, 2006–2010, 2016–2018
- Highest ranking: 55 (2008/2009)
- Best ranking finish: Last 32 (x3)

Ian Preece (born 23 June 1982) is a Welsh former professional snooker player, from the city of Newport.

Preece first appeared on the main tour in 2003, after a successful career as a junior; he held the record as the youngest winner of the World Amateur Championship in 1999, when he beat David Lilley 11–8 in the final.

== Career ==
Until 2009 his best runs were to the last 48 of tournaments, which he has achieved in the 2007 Welsh Open, 2007 China Open, 2007 UK Championship, and 2008 Shanghai Masters. He reached the last 32 of an event for the first time at the 2009 Welsh Open with victories over Peter Lines, Andrew Higginson and Stuart Bingham but was beaten 0–5 by Stephen Maguire. However the remainder of the 2008–09 season was poor and saw him in danger of dropping off the main tour, however he was awarded a wildcard from World Snooker which enabled him to compete on the tour for the 2009–10 season. However, he was unable to keep his place and so has slipped off the main tour.

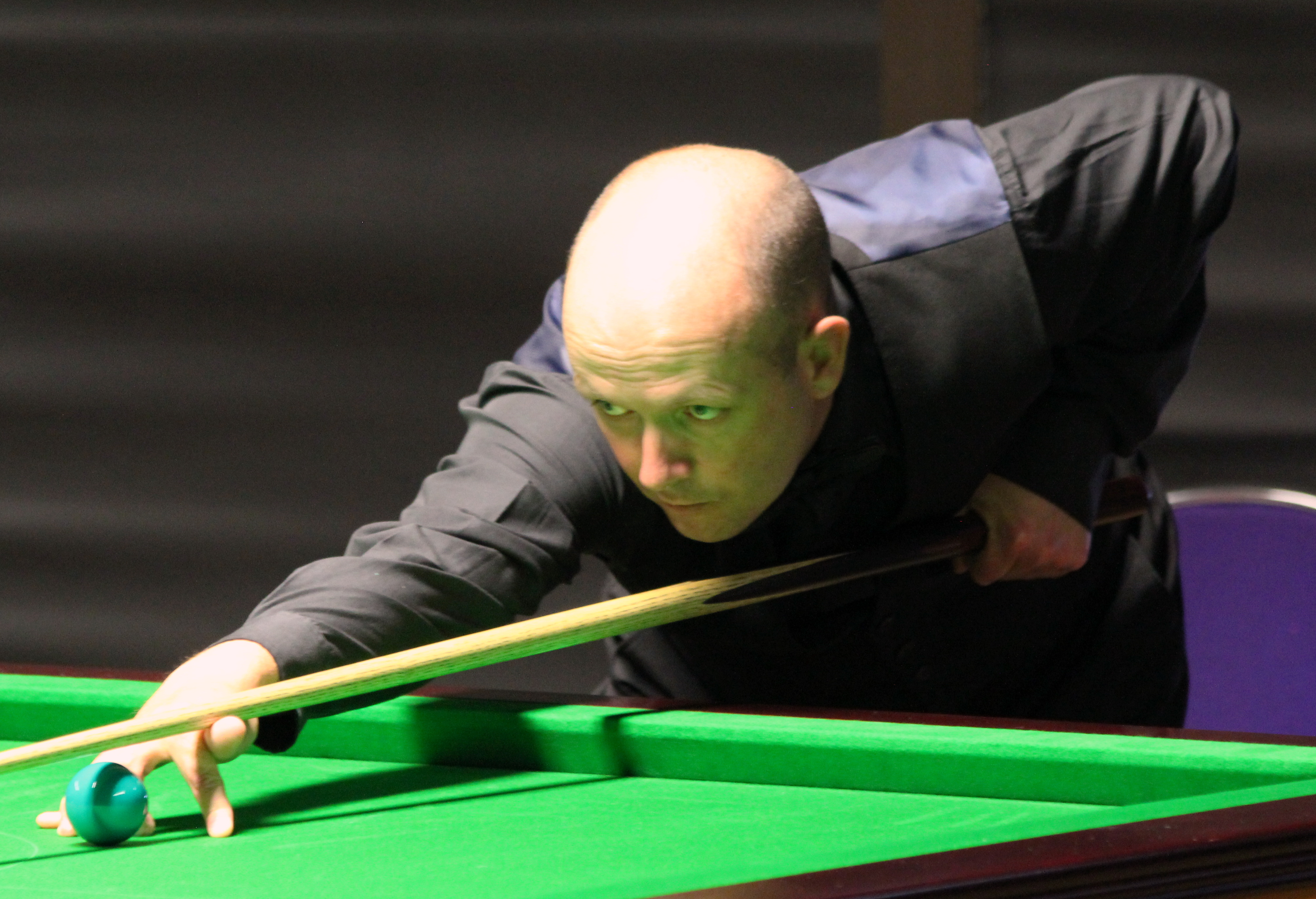
2017 Paul Hunter Classic

After six years out of the professional game, Preece reached the last 16 at Q-School Event One in 2016, losing 2–4 to Chen Zhe, and the same stage at Event Two, where he was defeated 4–1 by John Astley. However, these performances were sufficient for him to finish third on the Q-School Order of Merit, and he thus earned a two-year card to compete again on the main tour.

Preece won three matches in 2016 Shanghai Masters qualifying, but was denied a trip to China by David Gilbert losing out 5–2.

== Performance and rankings timeline ==
Tournaments	1998/ 99	1999/ 00	2000/ 01	2001/ 02	2002/ 03	2003/ 04	2004/ 05	2006/ 07	2007/ 08	2008/ 09	2009/ 10	2016/ 17	2017/ 18	2019/ 20
Ranking (Note: From the 2010/2011 season it shows the ranking at the beginning of the season.)	(Note: He was an amateur.)					(Note: New players on the Main Tour don't have a ranking.)			64	55	66		79	
Ranking tournaments
Riga Masters	Tournament Not Held											A	LQ	2R
International Championship	Tournament Not Held											A	1R	A
China Championship	Tournament Not Held											NR	1R	A
English Open	Tournament Not Held											3R	2R	A
World Open (Note: The event was called the LG Cup (2003/2004), and the Grand Prix (2004/2005–2009/2010))	A	A	A	A	A	LQ	A	LQ	LQ	LQ	LQ	LQ	LQ	A
Northern Ireland Open	Tournament Not Held											1R	1R	A
UK Championship	A	A	A	A	A	LQ	A	LQ	LQ	LQ	LQ	1R	1R	A
Scottish Open (Note: The event was called the Players Championship (2003/2004))	A	A	A	A	A	LQ	Tournament Not Held					2R	1R	A
European Masters (Note: The event was called the Irish Open (1998/1999), European Open (2001/2002–2003/2004), and the Malta Cup (2004/2005–2007/2008))	A	Not Held		A	A	LQ	A	LQ	NR	Not Held		A	1R	A
German Masters	Tournament Not Held											LQ	LQ	A
World Grand Prix	Tournament Not Held											DNQ	DNQ	DNQ
Welsh Open	A	A	A	A	A	LQ	A	1R	LQ	2R	LQ	1R	2R	A
Shoot-Out	Tournament Not Held											1R	2R	A
Players Championship	Tournament Not Held											DNQ	DNQ	DNQ
Gibraltar Open	Tournament Not Held											A	1R	A
Tour Championship	Tournament Not Held													DNQ
World Championship	LQ	LQ	LQ	LQ	LQ	LQ	LQ	LQ	LQ	LQ	LQ	LQ	LQ	LQ
Non-ranking tournaments
The Masters	A	A	A	LQ	LQ	WD	A	A	LQ	A	A	A	A	A
Former ranking tournaments
British Open	A	A	A	A	A	LQ	A	Tournament Not Held						
Irish Masters	Tournament Not Held				A	LQ	A	NR	Tournament Not Held					
Northern Ireland Trophy	Tournament Not Held							LQ	LQ	LQ	Tournament Not Held			
Bahrain Championship	Tournament Not Held									LQ	Tournament Not Held			
Shanghai Masters	Tournament Not Held								LQ	LQ	LQ	LQ	1R	NR
Paul Hunter Classic (Note: The event was called the Grand Prix Fürth (2004/2005) and the Fürth German Open (2006/2007))	Tournament Not Held						Pro-am Event					A	2R	NR
Indian Open	Tournament Not Held											LQ	1R	NH
China Open	A	A	A	A	Not Held		A	WR	LQ	LQ	LQ	LQ	LQ	NH

Performance Table Legend
LQ	lost in the qualifying draw	#R	lost in the early rounds of the tournament (WR = Wildcard round, RR = Round robin)	QF	lost in the quarter-finals
SF	lost in the semi-finals	F	lost in the final	W	won the tournament
DNQ	did not qualify for the tournament	A	did not participate in the tournament	WD	withdrew from the tournament

NH / Not Held	means an event was not held.
NR / Non-Ranking Event	means an event is/was no longer a ranking event.
R / Ranking Event	means an event is/was a ranking event.
MR / Minor-Ranking Event	means an event is/was a minor-ranking event.
PA / Pro-am Event	means an event is/was a pro-am event.

== Career finals ==
=== Pro-am finals: 1 (1 title) ===
Outcome	No.	Year	Championship	Opponent in the final	Score
Winner	1.	2000	Pontins Spring Open	(Scotland) Scott MacKenzie	7–4

=== Amateur finals: 4 (3 titles) ===
Outcome	No.	Year	Championship	Opponent in the final	Score
Winner	1.	1998	EBSA European Under-19 Snooker Championships	(Northern Ireland) Sean O'Neill	7–3
Runner-up	1.	1999	EBSA European Under-19 Snooker Championships	(Netherlands) Gerrit bij de Leij	3–6
Winner	2.	1999	Welsh Amateur Championship	(Wales) Milton Davies	8–7
Winner	3.	1999	IBSF World Snooker Championship	(England) David Lilley	11–8
