= Wayne Cooper (snooker player) =

English snooker player

Personal information
- Born: 9 June 1978 (age 48) Bradford, England

Sport
- Country: England
- Sport: Snooker
- Professional: 2001/02, 2008/09
- Highest ranking: 90 (2008/09)

Wayne Cooper (born 9 June 1978, in Bradford) is an English former professional snooker player. He first qualified for the main tour in 2001, and was a professional until Summer 2002. Cooper regained his place on the 2008/09 pro tour by finishing top of the EASB Pro Ticket Tour rankings. He won three matches during that season: in the Northern Ireland Trophy, in the Welsh Open and in the World Snooker Championship.

Cooper played in the 2020 World Seniors Championship as a replacement for Tony Drago, defeating Gary Filtness 4-2 before losing 1–4 to Michael Judge in the quarter-finals. He failed to qualify for the main 2021 World Seniors Championship after finishing second in his qualifying group to Peter Lines.
