= Stuart Pettman =

English snooker player

Personal information
- Born: 24 April 1975 (age 51) Preston, Lancashire, England

Sport
- Country: England
- Sport: Snooker
- Professional: 1992–2011
- Highest ranking: 35 (May–July 2010)
- Best ranking finish: Semi-final (2009 China Open)

Stuart Pettman (born 24 April 1975) is an English former professional snooker player. The Preston native qualified for the World Championship three times, in 2003, 2004 and 2010. He beat 2005 champion Shaun Murphy in qualifying to reach the 2004 World Championships. He spent 11 seasons on the professional snooker tour, with a highest ranking of 35 (2009/10 season).

== Career ==
He had ten last-32 defeats before he first reached the last 16 of a ranking event. He started 2007/2008 strongly, reaching the last 16 of the opening Shanghai Masters (winning 4 matches before benefitting from Ronnie O'Sullivan's withdrawal) and then qualifying for the final stages of the Grand Prix by winning all 7 group games. His form tailed off after this, but he had a strong run in the 2009 China Open, defeating Mark Allen, Ali Carter and Graeme Dott to reach his first career semi-final. Pettman qualified for the 2010 World Championship, but was beaten 10–1 in the first round by Ding Junhui. Following 10–2 defeats by Mark Williams and Stephen Hendry in 2003 and 2004 respectively, this means Pettman's win–loss ratio of frames played at the Crucible is 5–30.

Pettman retired from professional snooker after the 2010/2011 season. He wrote a book entitled Stuart Pettman: As Sometimes Seen On TV about his experiences on the World Snooker Tour.

== Performance and rankings timeline ==
Tournament	1992/ 93	1993/ 94		1994/ 95	1995/ 96	1996/ 97	1997/ 98	1998/ 99	1999/ 00	2000/ 01	2001/ 02	2002/ 03	2003/ 04	2004/ 05	2005/ 06	2006/ 07	2007/ 08	2008/ 09	2009/ 10	2010/ 11
Ranking	(Note: New players on the Main Tour don't have a ranking)	370		187	123	89	87	76	68	60	55	58	47	38	47	52	53	62	37	35
Ranking tournaments
Shanghai Masters	Tournament Not Held																2R	1R	LQ	LQ
World Open (Note: The event was called the Grand Prix (1992/1993–2000/2001, 2004/2005–2009/2010) and the LG Cup (2001/2002–2003/2004))	LQ	2R		LQ	LQ	LQ	1R	1R	LQ	LQ	LQ	LQ	2R	LQ	3R	LQ	RR	LQ	LQ	LQ
UK Championship	LQ	LQ		LQ	1R	LQ	LQ	LQ	2R	LQ	1R	LQ	1R	LQ	1R	LQ	LQ	LQ	LQ	LQ
German Masters (Note: The event was called the German Open (1995/1996-1997/1998))	Tournament Not Held				LQ	LQ	LQ	NR	Tournament Not Held											LQ
Welsh Open	LQ	LQ		LQ	2R	LQ	1R	LQ	2R	LQ	LQ	LQ	2R	LQ	LQ	LQ	LQ	LQ	LQ	LQ
Players Tour Championship Grand Final	Tournament Not Held																			DNQ
China Open (Note: The event was called the China International (1997/1998-1998/1999))	Tournament Not Held						NR	LQ	LQ	LQ	LQ	Not Held		LQ	LQ	LQ	LQ	SF	LQ	LQ
World Championship	LQ	LQ		LQ	LQ	LQ	LQ	LQ	LQ	LQ	LQ	1R	1R	LQ	LQ	LQ	LQ	LQ	1R	LQ
Non-ranking tournaments
Six-red World Championship (Note: The event was called the Six-red Snooker International (2008/2009) and the Six-red World Grand Prix (2009/2010))	Tournament Not Held																	2R	A	2R
The Masters	LQ	A		LQ	LQ	LQ	LQ	A	A	A	A	LQ	LQ	A	A	A	A	LQ	A	A
Shoot-Out	Tournament Not Held																			2R
Former ranking tournaments
Asian Classic (Note: The event was called the Dubai Classic (1992/1993-1994/1995) and the Thailand Classic (1995/1996))	LQ	LQ		LQ	LQ	LQ	Tournament Not Held													
Malta Grand Prix	Not Held			Non-Ranking Event					1R	NR	Tournament Not Held									
Thailand Masters (Note: The event was called the Asian Open (1992/1993) and the Thailand Open (1993/1994-1996/1997))	LQ	LQ		LQ	LQ	LQ	1R	LQ	LQ	LQ	1R	NR	Not Held			NR	Tournament Not Held			
Scottish Open (Note: The event was called the International Open (1992/1993-1996/1997) and the Players Championship (2003/2004))	LQ	LQ		LQ	LQ	2R	2R	2R	1R	LQ	LQ	LQ	1R	Tournament Not Held						
British Open	LQ	LQ		LQ	1R	LQ	LQ	LQ	LQ	LQ	LQ	LQ	LQ	LQ	Tournament Not Held					
Irish Masters	Non-Ranking Event											LQ	LQ	LQ	NH	NR	Tournament Not Held			
Malta Cup (Note: The event was called the European Open (1992/1993-1996/1997 and 2001/2002-2003/2004) and the Irish Open (1998/1999))	LQ	LQ		LQ	LQ	LQ	NH	LQ	Not Held		LQ	LQ	LQ	2R	LQ	LQ	NR	Not Held		
Northern Ireland Trophy	Tournament Not Held														NR	2R	LQ	2R	Not Held	
Bahrain Championship	Tournament Not Held																	LQ	Not Held	
Former non-ranking tournaments
Strachan Open	MR	LQ	LQ	Tournament Not Held																

Performance table legend
LQ	lost in the qualifying draw	#R	lost in the early rounds of the tournament (WR = Wildcard round, RR = Round robin)	QF	lost in the quarter-finals
SF	lost in the semi–finals	F	lost in the final	W	won the tournament
DNQ	did not qualify for the tournament	A	did not participate in the tournament	WD	withdrew from the tournament

NH / Not Held	means an event was not held.
NR / Non-Ranking Event	means an event is/was no longer a ranking event.
R / Ranking Event	means an event is/was a ranking event.
MR / Minor-Ranking Event	means an event is/was a minor-ranking event.

== Career finals ==
=== Non-ranking finals: 1 ===
Outcome	Year	Championship	Opponent in the final	Score
Runner-up	1999	Merseyside Professional Championship	(England) Stuart Bingham	1–5
