= Declan Hughes (snooker player) =

Northern Irish snooker player

Personal information
- Born: 27 April 1973 (age 53)

Sport
- Country: Northern Ireland
- Sport: Snooker
- Professional: 1993–1997, 2000/2001, 2008/2009
- Highest ranking: 96 (2008/2009)

Declan Hughes (born 27 April 1973) is a former professional snooker player from Northern Ireland.

== Career ==
He played on the main tour for the 2008–09 season; he qualified by topping the Northern Ireland amateur rankings. After failing to win a match in the season's opening events, he did not compete in the remainder of tournaments.

He won the Northern Ireland Amateur Championship and the Pontins Spring Open in 1992. He is also a pool player, winning the Irish 9-ball championship in 2008.

== Career finals ==
=== Pro-am finals: 1 (1 title) ===
Outcome	No.	Year	Championship	Opponent in the final	Score
Winner	1.	1992	Pontins Spring Open	(England) Steve James	7–2

=== Amateur finals: 3 (1 title) ===
Outcome	No.	Year	Championship	Opponent in the final	Score
Runner-up	1.	1991	UK Under-19 Championship	(Wales) Mark Williams	1–4
Winner	1.	1992	Northern Ireland Amateur Championship	(Northern Ireland) Andy Sharpe	10–8
Runner-up	2.	1992	All-Ireland Amateur Championship	(Republic of Ireland) Jason Watson	2–5
