= Liu Chuang (snooker player) =

Chinese snooker player (born 1990)

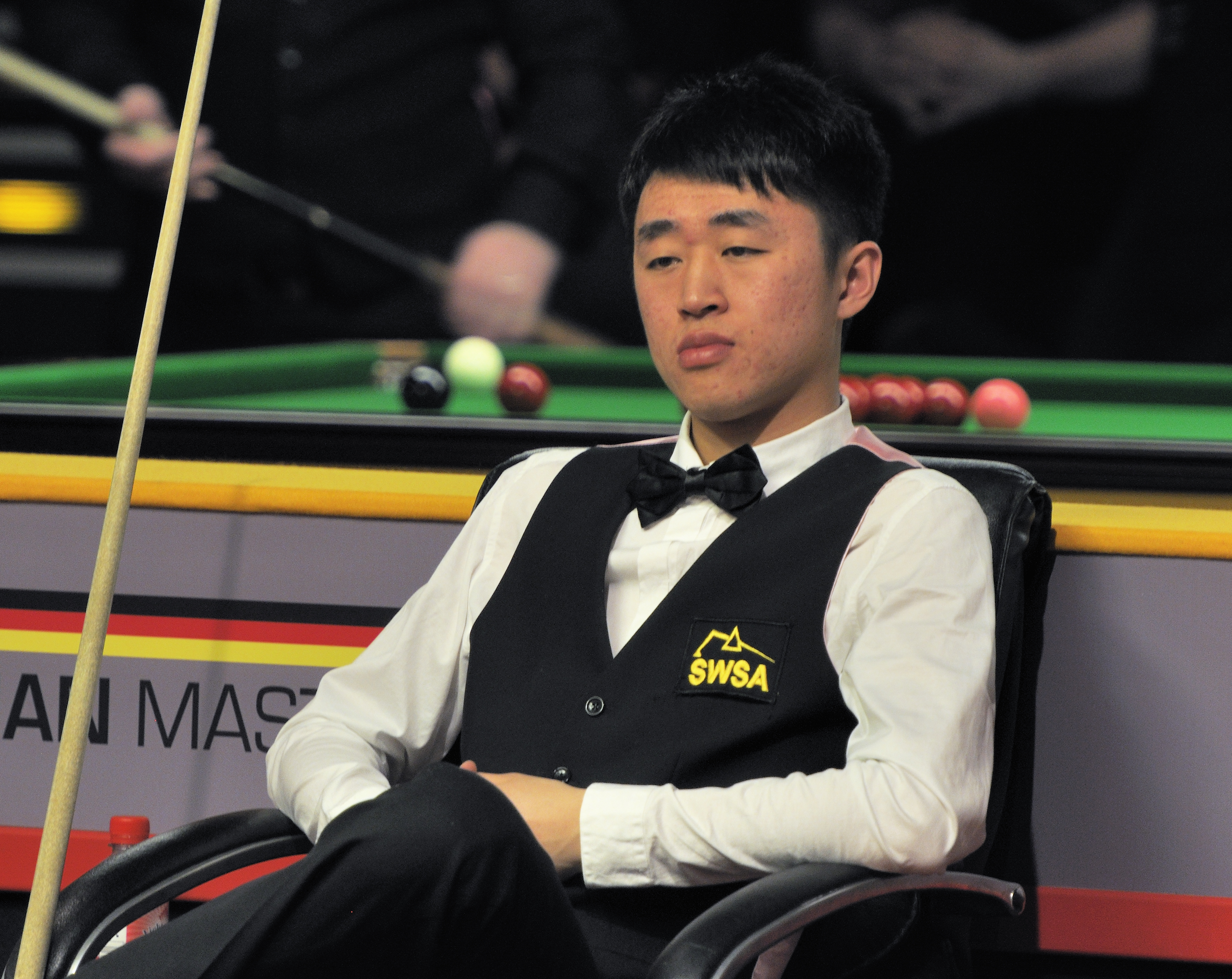
- Liu Chuang at the 2014 German Masters

Personal information
- Born: 6 June 1990 (age 36) Huludao, Liaoning, China

Sport
- Country: China
- Sport: Snooker
- Professional: 2007–2009, 2010–2016
- Highest ranking: 47 (September–October, November–December 2012)
- Best ranking finish: Last 32 (x4)
Medal record
Men's snooker
Representing China
Asian Indoor Games
Silver medal – second place	2007 Macau	Team

Liu Chuang (Chinese: 刘闯; pinyin: Liú Chuǎng, born 6 June 1990) is a Chinese former professional snooker player.

== Early life ==
Liu grew up in Liaoning province in northeast China. Near his parents' house there was a snooker table and when he was 10 he played on it and liked it a lot. His father noticed his potential, and supported him as did the person who owned that table, who became his first coach.

When he was 13, Liu travelled thousands of miles to play in southern China, where there were more professionals. There he improved and began to play competitive matches. In 2007, the chairman of the Asian Snooker Association saw his potential, and he gained a wild card in the China Open.

== Career ==
=== Junior ===
In 2005, Liu was a runner-up in a national junior tournament in China. In 2006, Liu reached the final of a senior national tournament.

=== Senior ===
Liu first came to the attention of the snooker world when he was picked as a wildcard to enter the 2007 China Open. Liu was victorious over Andy Hicks, beating him 5–4. That set up a meeting with Liu's idol, Ronnie O'Sullivan; Liu lost the match 1–5.

He reached the quarter-finals of the 2007 Asian Snooker Championship, where he lost 4–5 to Yasin Merchant.

In the 2008 World Championship he qualified for the main stage, He beat Colin Mitchell 10–0, Lee Walker 10–9 Joe Delaney 10–5, David Gray 10–5, and then Dominic Dale 10–9 to become only the fourth 17-year-old player to qualify for the Crucible after Stephen Hendry, Ronnie O'Sullivan and Judd Trump. Liu was drawn to play O'Sullivan in the first round. Despite being 0–3 down, Liu came back in the first session and levelled at 4–4, before O'Sullivan eventually won the game 10–5. Liu was relegated from the Main Tour after the following season.

On 15 April 2010, he won the Asian Under 21 Snooker Championship, defeating Thanawat Thirapongpaiboon 10–5 in the final. With this he qualified for the 2010/2011 professional Main Tour.

=== 2011/2012 season ===
Liu began the season ranked world number 60, meaning he would need to win three qualifying matches to reach the main stage of the ranking event tournaments. He did not achieve this until the final and biggest tournament on the snooker calendar, the World Championship. He beat Rod Lawler 10–7, Jimmy White 10–8 and Jamie Cope 10–7 to reach the Crucible for the second time in his career. Liu was one of five Asian players to make it to the event, which was a new record. He played two-time world champion Mark Williams in the first round and was beaten 6–10, to finish the season ranked number 56, inside the top 64 who automatically retained their places for the 2012–13 season.

=== 2012/2013 season ===
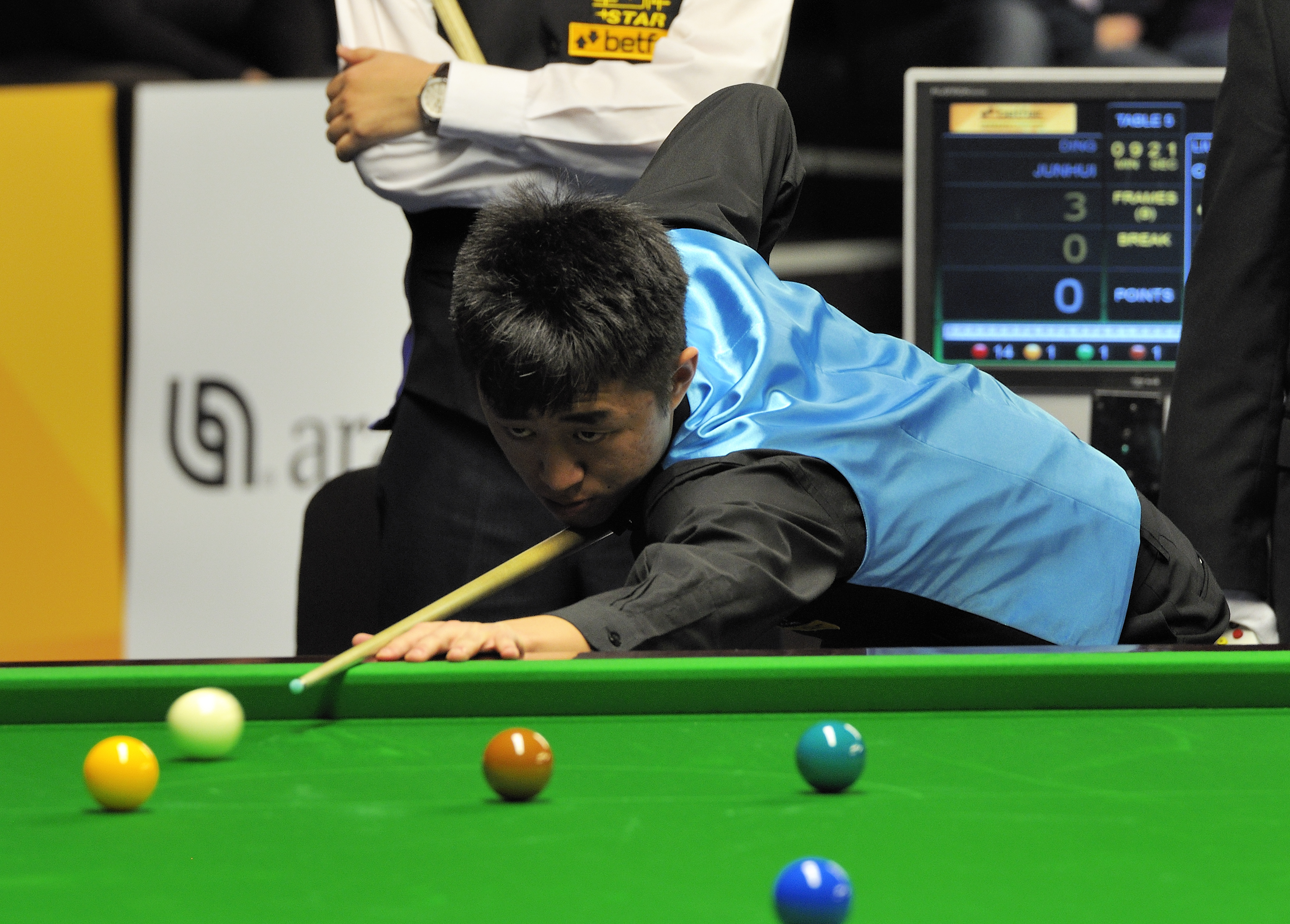
Liu Chuang at the 2013 German Masters

The 2012–13 season proved to be less successful for Liu as he failed to qualify for any of the ranking events. He played in seven of the ten minor-ranking Players Tour Championship events with his best finish coming in the last two European Tour tournaments, where he lost in the last 32 in both. He was ranked 72nd on the PTC Order of Merit. Liu's season ended when he lost in the second round of World Championship Qualifying 9–10 to Dechawat Poomjaeng, which saw him placed world number 54 in the rankings.

=== 2013/2014 season ===
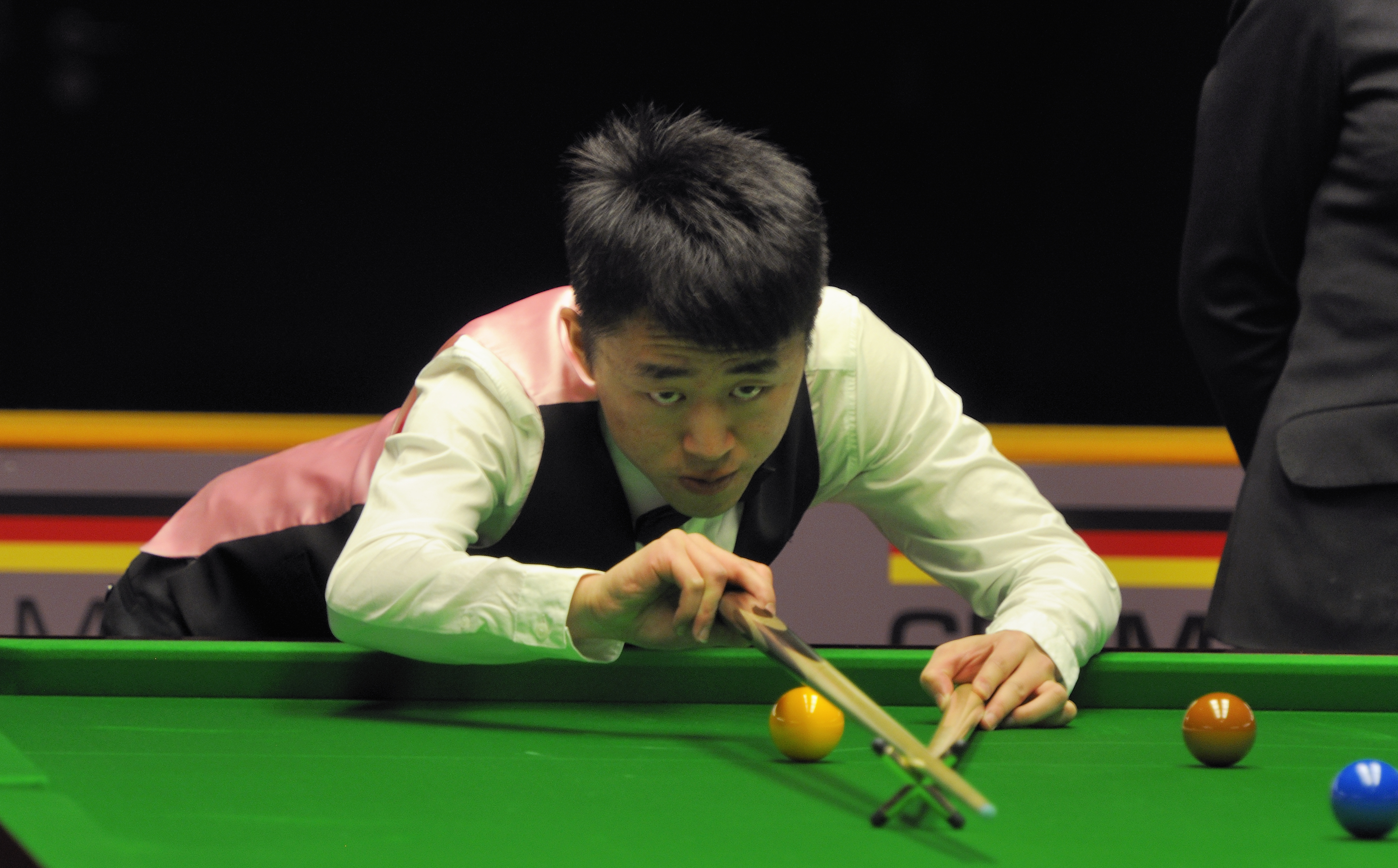
Liu Chuang at the 2014 German Masters

Liu received first round entry into the UK Championship and Welsh Open as all 128 players on the snooker tour began at the venue stage. It was at these events where Liu won his only matches in ranking events this season. In the UK he beat Tony Drago 6–1, before losing 6–5 against Robert Milkins and at the Welsh he saw off Chen Zhe 4–2, but was then whitewashed 4–0 by Joe Perry. Chuang reached two quarter-finals in Asian Tour events during the 2013–14 season, at the Yixing Open and Zhengzhou Open, losing 4–0 to Mark Selby and 4–2 to Liang Wenbo respectively. Chuang finished outside of the top 64 in the world rankings and would have been relegated from the tour; however, his placing of 12th on the Asian Order of Merit saw him earn a fresh two-year card for the 2014–15 and 2015–16 seasons by claiming the third of four spots available to non-qualified players.

=== 2014/2015 season ===
Liu entered the qualifying rounds of three ranking events this season and lost his first match in each. His only wins came at the Yixing Open where he beat Michael Tomlinson and Wang Heng, before losing 4–0 to Li Hang in the last 32. Liu has not played in an event since October 2014.

=== Chinese 8 Ball ===
Liu made it to the final of the 2016 World Chinese 8 Ball Masters and lost to Yang Fan 12–9. The match was a best of 25 race to 13, but the 110 minute time limit ran out.

== Performance and rankings timeline ==
Tournament	2005/ 06	2006/ 07	2007/ 08	2008/ 09	2009/ 10	2010/ 11	2011/ 12	2012/ 13	2013/ 14	2014/ 15	2015/ 16
Ranking (Note: From the 2010/2011 season it shows the ranking at the beginning of the season.)	(Note: He was an amateur.)		(Note: New players on the Main Tour don't have a ranking.)	81	(Note: He was an amateur.)		60	56	54	(Note: Players qualified through Asian Tour Order of Merit started the season without prize money ranking points.)	122
Ranking tournaments
Australian Goldfields Open	Tournament Not Held						LQ	LQ	LQ	LQ	A
Shanghai Masters	Not Held		WR	LQ	A	LQ	LQ	LQ	LQ	A	A
International Championship	Tournament Not Held							LQ	LQ	LQ	A
UK Championship	A	A	LQ	LQ	A	LQ	LQ	LQ	2R	WD	A
German Masters	Tournament Not Held					LQ	LQ	LQ	1R	A	A
Welsh Open	A	A	LQ	LQ	A	LQ	LQ	LQ	2R	A	A
Players Championship Grand Final (Note: The event was called the Players Tour Championship Grand Finals (2010/2011–2012/2013))	Tournament Not Held					DNQ	DNQ	DNQ	DNQ	DNQ	DNQ
China Open	WR	1R	LQ	LQ	1R	LQ	LQ	LQ	LQ	A	A
World Championship	A	A	1R	LQ	A	LQ	1R	LQ	LQ	A	A
Non-ranking tournaments
Six-red World Championship (Note: The event was called the Six-red Snooker International (2008/2009) and the Six-red World Grand Prix (2009/2010))	Not Held			A	A	RR	NH	A	A	A	A
Masters	A	A	LQ	LQ	A	A	A	A	A	A	A
Shoot-Out	Tournament Not Held					A	1R	3R	A	A	A
Former ranking tournaments
Northern Ireland Trophy	NR	A	LQ	LQ	Tournament Not Held						
Bahrain Championship	Not Held			LQ	Tournament Not Held						
World Open (Note: The event run under different name as Grand Prix (2005/2006–2009/2010))	A	A	LQ	LQ	A	LQ	LQ	LQ	LQ	Not Held	
Wuxi Classic (Note: The event ran under the name Jiangsu Classic (2008/2009–2009/2010))	Not Held			Non-Ranking Event				LQ	LQ	LQ	NH
Indian Open	Tournament Not Held								1R	A	NH
Former non-ranking tournaments
Huangshan Cup	Not Held		QF	Tournament Not Held							
Wuxi Classic	Not Held			RR	A	A	A	Ranking Event			

Performance Table Legend
LQ	lost in the qualifying draw	#R	lost in the early rounds of the tournament (WR = Wildcard round, RR = Round robin)	QF	lost in the quarter-finals
SF	lost in the semi-finals	F	lost in the final	W	won the tournament
DNQ	did not qualify for the tournament	A	did not participate in the tournament	WD	withdrew from the tournament

NH / Not Held	means an event was not held.
NR / Non-Ranking Event	means an event is/was no longer a ranking event.
R / Ranking Event	means an event is/was a ranking event.
MR / Minor-Ranking Event	means an event is/was a minor-ranking event.

== Career finals ==
=== Amateur finals: 1 (1 title) ===
Outcome	No.	Year	Championship	Opponent in the final	Score
Winner	1.	2010	Asian Under-21 Championship	(Thailand) Thanawat Thirapongpaiboon	5–6
