= Vincent Muldoon =

Irish snooker player

Sport
- Sport: Snooker
- Professional: 2008/2009
- Highest ranking: 81

Vincent Muldoon is a former professional snooker player. After being a successful junior player (he was a European Under-19 Championship finalist in 2007), he became a professional in 2008. Despite some good performances throughout the 2008–09 season, including losing narrowly 8–10 to Jimmy White in the second qualifying round of the 2009 World Championship, he fell off the tour.

== Performance and rankings timeline ==
Tournament	2007/ 08	2008/ 09
Ranking (Note: It shows the ranking at the beginning of the season.)	(Note: He was an amateur.)	(Note: New players on the Main Tour don't have a ranking.)
Ranking tournaments
Northern Ireland Trophy	A	LQ
Shanghai Masters	A	LQ
Grand Prix	A	LQ
Bahrain Championship	NH	LQ
UK Championship	A	LQ
Welsh Open	A	LQ
China Open	A	LQ
World Championship	A	LQ
Former non-ranking tournaments
Irish Professional Championship	QF	NH

Performance Table Legend
LQ	lost in the qualifying draw	#R	lost in the early rounds of the tournament (WR = Wildcard round, RR = Round robin)	QF	lost in the quarter-finals
SF	lost in the semi-finals	F	lost in the final	W	won the tournament
DNQ	did not qualify for the tournament	A	did not participate in the tournament	WD	withdrew from the tournament

NH / Not Held	event was not held.
NR / Non-Ranking Event	event is/was no longer a ranking event.
R / Ranking Event	event is/was a ranking event.
MR / Minor-Ranking Event	means an event is/was a minor-ranking event.
PA / Pro-am Event	means an event is/was a pro-am event.

== Tournament finals ==
=== Amateur finals ===
Outcome	No.	Year	Championship	Opponent in the final	Score
Runner-up	1.	2006	European Under-19 Snooker Championship	(England) Ben Woollaston	4–6
Winner	1.	2007	Irish Amateur Championship	(Republic of Ireland) John Torpey	8–2
Runner-up	2.	2007	European Under-19 Snooker Championship (2)	(Wales) Michael White	2–6
Winner	2.	2008	Irish Amateur Championship (2)	(Republic of Ireland) Garry Hardiman	8–4
Runner-up	3.	2010	Irish Amateur Championship	(Republic of Ireland) Martin McCrudden	6–8
Runner-up	4.	2011	European Snooker Championship	(Wales) Daniel Wells	4–7
Winner	3.	2012	Irish Amateur Championship (3)	(Republic of Ireland) Martin McCrudden	10–5
