= Atthasit Mahitthi =

Thai snooker player (born 1978)

Personal information
- Born: September 13, 1978 (age 48)

Sport
- Country: Thailand
- Sport: Snooker
- Professional: 2001–2004, 2008–2010
- Highest ranking: 75 (2009/2010)
Medal record
Representing Thailand
Men's Snooker
Asian Games
Bronze medal – third place	2006 Doha	Individual
Bronze medal – third place	2006 Doha	Doubles
Southeast Asian Games
Gold medal – first place	1999 Bandar Seri Begawan	Team
Bronze medal – third place	2007 Korat	Singles
Gold medal – first place	2007 Korat	Doubles
Men's English billiards
Southeast Asian Games
Silver medal – second place	2005 Makati	Doubles

Atthasit Mahitthi (Thai: อรรถสิทธิ์ มหิทธิ) (born 13 September 1978) is a former professional Thai snooker player.

Mahitthi reached the semi-finals at the 2006 IBSF World Amateur Championship in Amman, Jordan, where he was eliminated by Kurt Maflin 8–4. He earned a place on the Main Tour for the 2008–09 season by winning the 2007 IBSF World Amateur Championship, but dropped off at the end of the 2009–10 season. He had a good run in the 2008 Bahrain Championship, winning three qualifying matches before being paired with Steve Davis. He lost 4–5 to Davis in the final qualifying round.

In 2002, he qualified for the first round of the LG Cup, but lost 1–5 to David Gray.

== Performance and rankings timeline ==
Tournament	1998/ 99	1999/ 00	2000/ 01	2001/ 02	2002/ 03	2003/ 04	2004/ 05	2008/ 09	2009/ 10	2017/ 18
Ranking (Note: It shows the ranking at the beginning of the season)	(Note: He was an amateur)			(Note: New players on the Main Tour do not have a ranking)	104	100			75	
Ranking tournaments
World Open (Note: The event was called the Grand Prix (1998/1999–2000/2001, 2004/2005 and 2008/2009–2009/2010) and the LG Cup (2001/2002–2003/2004))	A	A	A	LQ	1R	LQ	A	LQ	LQ	A
European Masters (Note: The event was called the Irish Open (1998/1999), the European Open (2001/2002-2003/2004) and the Malta Cup (2004/2005))	A	Not Held		LQ	LQ	LQ	A	Not Held		A
Shanghai Masters	Tournament Not Held							LQ	LQ	A
UK Championship	A	A	A	LQ	LQ	LQ	A	LQ	LQ	A
Scottish Open (Note: The event was called the Players Championship (2003/2004))	A	A	A	LQ	LQ	LQ	Not Held			A
World Grand Prix	Tournament Not Held									DNQ
Welsh Open	A	A	A	LQ	LQ	LQ	A	LQ	LQ	A
Players Championship	Tournament Not Held									DNQ
China Open (Note: The event was called the China International (1998/1999))	A	A	A	LQ	Not Held		A	LQ	LQ	A
World Championship	A	LQ	LQ	LQ	LQ	LQ	LQ	LQ	LQ	A
Non-ranking tournaments
Six-red World Championship (Note: The event was called the Six-red Snooker International (2008/2009) and the Six-red World Grand Prix (2009/2010))	Tournament Not Held							2R	A	RR
The Masters	A	A	A	LQ	LQ	LQ	A	LQ	LQ	A
Former ranking tournaments
Thailand Masters	WR	A	A	LQ	NR	Tournament Not Held				
British Open	A	A	A	LQ	LQ	LQ	A	Not Held		
Irish Masters	Non-Ranking Event				LQ	LQ	A	Not Held		
Northern Ireland Trophy	Tournament Not Held							LQ	Not Held	
Bahrain Championship	Tournament Not Held							LQ	Not Held	
Former non-ranking tournaments
World Champions v Asia Stars Challenge	Tournament Not Held						SF	Not Held		

Performance table legend
LQ	lost in the qualifying draw	#R	lost in the early rounds of the tournament (WR = Wildcard round, RR = Round robin)	QF	lost in the quarter-finals
SF	lost in the semi–finals	F	lost in the final	W	won the tournament
DNQ	did not qualify for the tournament	A	did not participate in the tournament	WD	withdrew from the tournament

NH / Not Held	means an event was not held.
NR / Non-Ranking Event	means an event is/was no longer a ranking event.
R / Ranking Event	means an event is/was a ranking event.
MR / Minor-Ranking Event	means an event is/was a minor-ranking event.

== Career finals ==
=== Amateur finals: 2 (1 title) ===
Outcome	No.	Year	Championship	Opponent in the final	Score
Runner-up	1.	2006	Thailand Amateur Championship	(Thailand) Issara Kachaiwong	4–5
Winner	1.	2007	World Amateur Championship	(Thailand) Passakorn Suwannawat	11–7
