= Jin Long (snooker player) =

Chinese snooker player

Personal information
- Nickname: Golden Dragon
- Born: 23 May 1981 (age 45) Jinzhou, Liaoning, China

Sport
- Country: China
- Sport: Snooker
- Professional: 2002/2003, 2004–2006, 2008–2010, 2013/2014
- Highest ranking: 60 (2009/10)
- Best ranking finish: Last 16 (x1)
Medal record
Men's Snooker
Representing China
Asian Indoor Games
Silver medal – second place	2007 Macau	Team
Gold medal – first place	2009 Ho Chi Minh City	Singles
Asian Games
Silver medal – second place	2002 Busan	Team

Jin Long (Chinese: 金龙; born 23 May 1981) is a Chinese former professional snooker player. He is nicknamed "Golden Dragon", which is a translation of his given name.

== Career ==
He became professional in 2001 following his strong runs to the finals of the Asian and Chinese Championships. His first Main Tour stints were rather unsuccessful, with the best result a last 48 appearance at the 2004 Grand Prix. Jin has regained a Main Tour place by winning the 2008 Asian Championship, beating Aditya Mehta 7–3 in the final, having had spells on the tour on three previous occasions. He has been a regular wildcard in the China Open and he also competed in the 2008 Jiangsu Classic finishing above top players such as Shaun Murphy and Neil Robertson in his group, eventually finishing third.

=== 2011/2012 season ===
Jin recorded the best ranking event finish of his career to date at the 2012 World Open, where he reached the last 16. He was selected to play in the wildcard round, where he beat Sam Baird 5–3 to qualify for the last 32 and a match up with compatriot Ding Junhui. Jin capitalised on his opponent's mistakes and won the match 5–1, but could not continue his run in the tournament in the next round as he lost 5–2 to Robert Milkins. Long won his first event in the Invitational HK Spring Trophy. This event was organised by the same event organisers as the General Cup. Long beat Li Hang in the final.

=== 2012/2013 season ===
Jin played in the wildcard round of the Wuxi Classic and Shanghai Masters this season, losing 5–3 to Jamie Burnett in the former. In Shanghai he saw off Jimmy Robertson 5–4, before Graeme Dott beat him 5–2 in the first round. He played in all three of the new Asian Tour events with his best finish coming at the Second Event where he was knocked out 4–2 in the quarter-finals by Cao Yupeng. This result was a major factor in him finishing 13th on the Order of Merit, high enough to receive a place on the main tour for the next two seasons.

=== 2013/2014 season ===
Despite being able to enter qualifying for every ranking event in the 2013–14 season, Jin only played in the four Asian Tour events. He was beaten in the last 64 once and in the last 32 three times to finish 30th on the Order of Merit and 116th in the snooker world rankings. For the 2014–15 season, he didn't renew his WPBSA membership and was therefore no longer on the World Snooker Tour.

=== 2014/2015 season ===
Jin played in two events during the 2014/2015 season, losing 4–0 to Ian Burns the opening round of the Haining Open and defeating Wang Heng 4–3 at the Xuzhou Open, before losing 4–2 to Mark King in the second round.

=== 2015/2016 season ===
Jin only played in the Haining Open and lost 4–2 to James Cahill in the first round.

== Performance and rankings timeline ==
Tournament	2001/ 02	2002/ 03	2003/ 04	2004/ 05	2005/ 06	2006/ 07	2007/ 08	2008/ 09	2009/ 10	2010/ 11	2011/ 12	2012/ 13	2013/ 14	2014/ 15	2016/ 17	2017/ 18	2018/ 19	2019/ 20
Ranking (Note: From the 2010/2011 season it shows the ranking at the beginning of the season.)	(Note: He was an amateur.)	(Note: New players don't have a ranking.)			93				60									
Ranking tournaments
World Open (Note: The event was called the LG Cup (2001/2002–2003/2004) and the Grand Prix (2004/2005–2009/2010))	A	LQ	A	1R	LQ	A	A	LQ	LQ	A	2R	A	A	NH	A	A	A	A
UK Championship	A	LQ	A	LQ	LQ	A	A	LQ	LQ	A	A	A	A	A	A	A	A	A
Scottish Open	A	LQ	A	Tournament Not Held								MR	Not Held		A	A	A	A
European Masters (Note: The event was called the European Open (2001/2002–2003/2004) and the Malta Cup (2004/2005–2007/2008))	A	LQ	A	LQ	LQ	A	NR	Tournament Not Held							A	A	A	A
Welsh Open	A	LQ	A	LQ	WD	A	A	LQ	LQ	A	A	A	A	A	A	A	A	A
Players Championship (Note: The event was called the Players Tour Championship Grand Finals (2010/2011–2012/2013) and the Players Championship Grand Final (2013/2014–2015/2016))	Non Held									A	A	DNQ	DNQ	DNQ	DNQ	DNQ	DNQ	DNQ
China Open	A	Not Held		WR	WD	WR	WR	LQ	LQ	WR	WR	A	A	A	A	A	A	A
World Championship	LQ	LQ	LQ	LQ	LQ	A	A	LQ	LQ	A	A	A	A	A	A	A	A	A
Non-ranking tournaments
Haining Open	Tournament Not Held													MR	2R	A	2R	2R
The Masters	LQ	LQ	LQ	A	A	A	A	LQ	A	A	A	A	A	A	A	A	A	A
Former ranking tournaments
British Open	A	LQ	A	LQ	Tournament Not Held													
Irish Masters	A	LQ	A	LQ	NH	NR	Tournament Not Held											
Northern Ireland Trophy	Not Held				NR	A	A	LQ	Not Held									
Bahrain Championship	Not Held							LQ	Not Held									
Wuxi Classic (Note: The event ran under the name Jiangsu Classic (2008/2009–2009/2010))	Not Held							Non-Ranking				WR	A	A	Tournament Not Held			
Shanghai Masters	Tournament Not Held						WR	LQ	LQ	1R	WR	1R	WD	A	A	A	NR	
Former non-ranking tournaments
Huangshan Cup	Tournament Not Held						SF	Tournament Not Held										
Masters Qualifying Event (Note: The event was called the Benson and Hedges Championship (2001/2002–2002/2003))	LQ	LQ	LQ	NH	A	A	A	QF	A	Tournament Not Held								
Wuxi Classic	Tournament Not Held							RR	RR	A	A	Ranking Event			Tournament Not Held			
Beijing International Challenge	Tournament Not Held								RR	RR	Tournament Not Held							
Hainan Classic	Tournament Not Held									RR	Tournament Not Held							

Performance Table Legend
LQ	lost in the qualifying draw	#R	lost in the early rounds of the tournament (WR = Wildcard round, RR = Round robin)	QF	lost in the quarter-finals
SF	lost in the semi-finals	F	lost in the final	W	won the tournament
DNQ	did not qualify for the tournament	A	did not participate in the tournament	WD	withdrew from the tournament

NH / Not held	means an event was not held.
MR / Minor-ranking event	means an event is/was a minor-ranking event.
NR / Non-ranking event	means an event is/was no longer a ranking event.
R / Ranking event	means an event is/was now a ranking event

== Career finals ==
=== Non-ranking finals: 2 (1 title) ===
Outcome	No.	Year	Championship	Opponent in the final	Score
Runner-up	1.	2004	Challenge Tour – Event 4	(England) Gary Wilson	4–6
Winner	1.	2005	HK Spring Trophy	(China) Li Hang	#

=== Pro–am finals: 1 (1 title) ===
Outcome	No.	Year	Championship	Opponent in the final	Score
Winner	1.	2009	Asian Indoor Games	(Afghanistan) Nader Khan Sultani	4–0

=== Amateur finals: 3 (2 titles) ===
Outcome	No.	Year	Championship	Opponent in the final	Score
Runner-up	1.	2001	ACBS Asian Championship	(India) Yasin Merchant	4–8
Winner	1.	2005	ACBS Asian Championship	(China) Cai Jianzhong	6–4
Winner	2.	2008	ACBS Asian Championship (2)	(India) Aditya Mehta	7–3
