= Stephen Craigie =

English snooker player

Personal information
- Born: 19 June 1990 (age 36)

Sport
- Country: England
- Sport: Snooker
- Professional: 2008/2009
- Highest ranking: 79 (end of 2008/2009 season)

Stephen Craigie (born 19 June 1990) is an English former professional snooker player from Newcastle. As a junior, he won a number of tournaments and he secured his place on the Main Tour for the first time in the 2008–2009 season by winning the European Under-19 Championship.

However, he was unable to retain his place, his season culminating in a 10–5 defeat to Lee Spick in the first qualifying round of the World Championship.

Craigie's younger brother Sam is also a professional snooker player.

== Performance and rankings timeline ==
Tournament	2008/ 09	2010/ 11	2011/ 12
Ranking	(Note: New players on the Main Tour don't have a ranking.)	(Note: He was an amateur.)	
Ranking tournaments
Shanghai Masters	LQ	A	A
World Open (Note: The event was called the Grand Prix (2008/2009))	LQ	A	A
UK Championship	LQ	A	A
Welsh Open	LQ	A	A
Players Tour Championship Finals	NH	DNQ	DNQ
China Open	LQ	A	A
World Championship	LQ	A	A
Non-ranking tournaments
The Masters	LQ	A	A
Former ranking tournaments
Northern Ireland Trophy	LQ	Not Held	
Bahrain Championship	LQ	Not Held	

Performance Table Legend
LQ	lost in the qualifying draw	#R	lost in the early rounds of the tournament (WR = Wildcard round, RR = Round robin)	QF	lost in the quarter-finals
SF	lost in the semi–finals	F	lost in the final	W	won the tournament
DNQ	did not qualify for the tournament	A	did not participate in the tournament	WD	withdrew from the tournament

NH / Not Held	means an event was not held.
NR / Non-Ranking Event	means an event is/was no longer a ranking event.
R / Ranking Event	means an event is/was a ranking event.
MR / Minor-Ranking Event	means an event is/was a minor-ranking event.
PA / Pro-am Event	means an event is/was a pro-am event.

== Career finals ==
=== Pro-am finals: 4 ===
Outcome	No.	Year	Championship	Opponent in the final	Score
Runner-up	1.	2007	Pontins Pro-Am – Event 5	(Wales) Dominic Dale	2–4
Runner-up	2.	2008	Pontins Pro-Am – Event 6	(England) Peter Lines	1–4
Runner-up	3.	2010	Pontins Spring Open	(England) Nigel Bond	2–5
Runner-up	4.	2010	Paul Hunter English Open	(England) Robbie Williams	4–6

=== Amateur finals: 1 (1 title) ===
Outcome	No.	Year	Championship	Opponent in the final	Score
Winner	1.	2008	EBSA European Under-19 Snooker Championships	(Scotland) Anthony McGill	6–2
