= Chris McBreen =

New Zealand snooker player

Personal information
- Born: 9 August 1972 (age 54)

Sport
- Country: New Zealand
- Sport: Snooker
- Professional: 2001/2002, 2008/2009
- Highest ranking: 95 (2008/2009)

Chris McBreen (born 9 August 1972) is a New Zealand former professional snooker player, living in Germany. He was runner-up in the Oceania Play-offs, however Glen Wilkinson who beat him decided not take his place on the Main Tour.
