= Lewis Roberts (snooker player) =

English snooker player

Personal information
- Born: 2 July 1985 (age 41)

Sport
- Country: England
- Sport: Snooker
- Professional: 2008/2009
- Highest ranking: 86 (2008/2009)

Lewis Roberts (born 2 July 1985) is an English professional snooker player. He became a professional in 2008, however he did not retain his place on the tour at the end of the 2008–09 season.

== Career ==
In his first season as a professional, Lewis he won only three matches – 4–3 over Barry Pinches in the Masters qualifying event, 5–2 over Vincent Muldoon in the China Open and 10–8 over Aditya Mehta in the World Championship.

He was relegated from the professional tour in 2009.
