= Andrew Higginson (snooker player) =

English snooker player (born 1977)

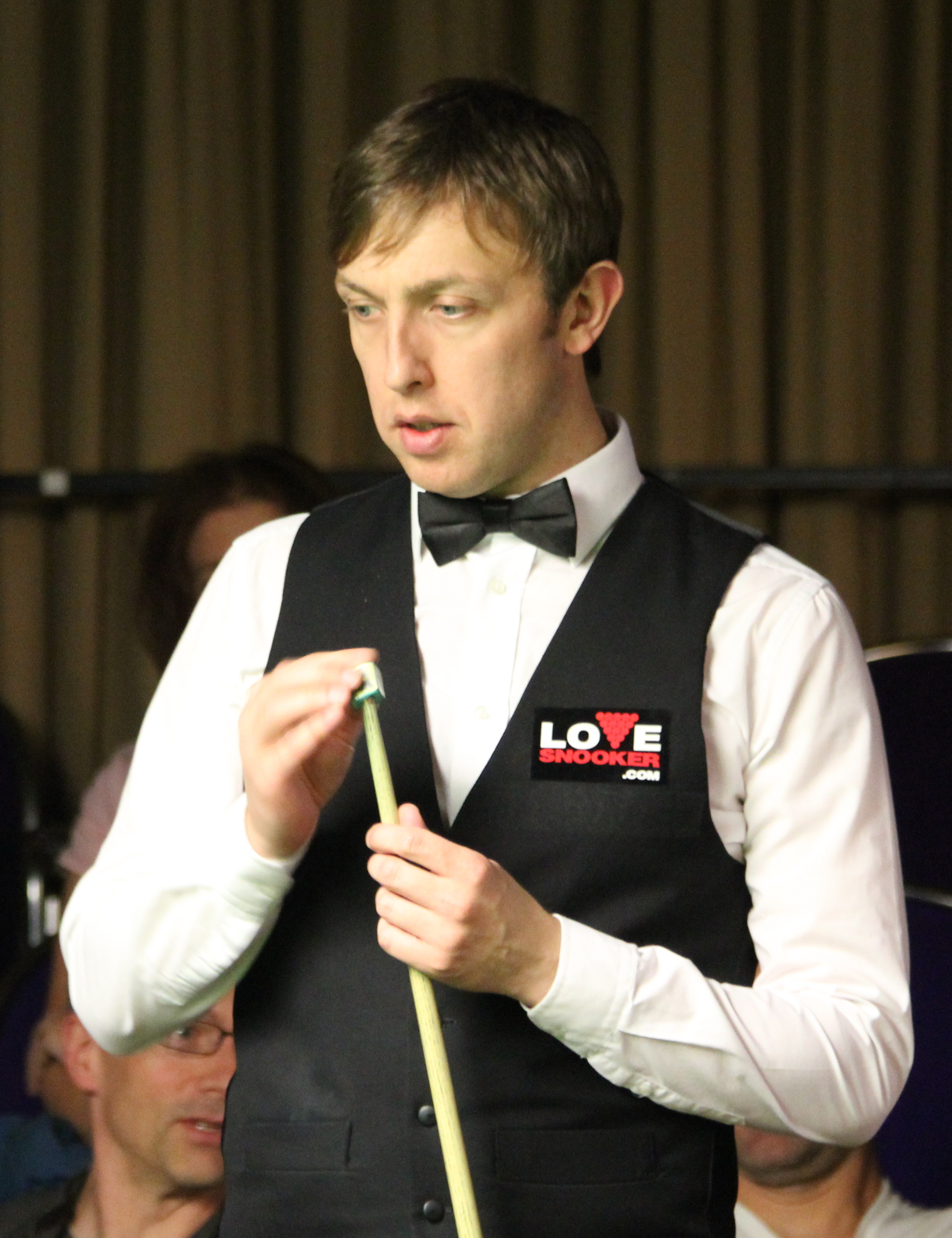
- Higginson in 2012

Personal information
- Nickname: The Widnes Warrior
- Born: 13 December 1977 (age 48) Widnes, Cheshire, England

Sport
- Country: England
- Sport: Snooker
- Professional: 1996–1999, 2000–2004, 2006–2022, 2023–2025, 2026–present
- Highest ranking: 18 (October–November 2011 and May–July 2012)
- Current ranking: 112 (as of 7 November 2026)
- Maximum breaks: 1
- Century breaks: 165 (as of 19 November 2026)
- Best ranking finish: Runner-up (2007 Welsh Open)

Tournament wins
- Minor-ranking: 1

Andrew Higginson (born 13 December 1977) is an English professional snooker player from Widnes, Cheshire. He is best known for being the surprise finalist of the 2007 Welsh Open.

== Career ==
=== Early years ===
After some success in amateur tournaments, Higginson turned professional for the 2000/2001 season after finishing third on the Challenge Tour. He remained there for five seasons before dropping off, after encountering limited success. He won a place back on the tour for 2006/2007 after finishing second on the Pontins' International Open Series.

=== Breakthrough ===
Higginson reached the televised stages of a ranking tournament for the first time at the 2007 Malta Cup, where he beat Steve Davis 5–4 before losing 2–5 to Ken Doherty at the last 16. At the very next tournament, the 2007 Welsh Open, Higginson hit an extraordinary run of form, defeating Marco Fu 5–2, John Higgins 5–3 (from 0–3 down), Michael Judge 5–1, Ali Carter 5–1 (making his first professional 147 break in the process) and Stephen Maguire 6–3 to reach the final. As he had spent the 2005–06 season on the secondary Challenge Tour, he was the first unranked player to reach a ranking final since Terry Griffiths won the World title in 1979. At the end of the first session of the final, he trailed 2–6 to Neil Robertson. In the second session, Higginson managed to take the lead and change the score to 8–6, but Robertson recovered to level the scores at 8–8 and force a deciding frame, which he won. Higginson earned £20,000 for his 147 break, £2000 for the highest break and £17,500 for being the runner-up.

=== Subsequent career ===
Despite his good season, Higginson failed to qualify for the 2007 World Championship, losing 9–10 to Ricky Walden in the third qualifying round. His performance in the Welsh Open and Malta Cup brought him to 44th in the 2007/2008 rankings, and 24th on the one-year list.

The following season proved tougher, with Higginson only qualifying for one event – the 2008 Welsh Open again.

However, he qualified for the 2008 Grand Prix, losing 0–5 to Mark Selby in the last 32. He then beat Jamie Jones and Michael Judge to make his Crucible debut in the 2009 World Championship, giving eventual finalist Shaun Murphy a test, leading 7–6 before losing 8–10.

=== 2011/12 ===
Higginson won his first professional title during the 2011–12 season at the minor-ranking Players Tour Championship Event 5, where he beat reigning world champion John Higgins 4–1 in the final. He played in all 12 of the PTC events and finished 6th on the Order of Merit, comfortably inside the top 24 who qualified for the Finals. At the Finals he beat Jamie Jones and Xiao Guodong, before losing to Stephen Lee 2–4 in the semi-finals.

He qualified for all but three of the other ranking events during the season. In the German Masters he led Ronnie O'Sullivan 4–0 in their best-of-nine frames first round match, before being defeated 5–4 having missed a pot in the sixth frame that would have left O'Sullivan requiring snookers to stay in the tournament. He finished the season by reaching the last 16 of the World Championship after defeating Stephen Lee 10–6 in the first round. There he trailed Jamie Jones 6–10 after two sessions, but rallied to level at 10–10, before Jones won three successive frames to take the match 13–10. Higginson finished the season ranked world number 18, meaning he had climbed 7 places during the year.

=== 2012/13 ===
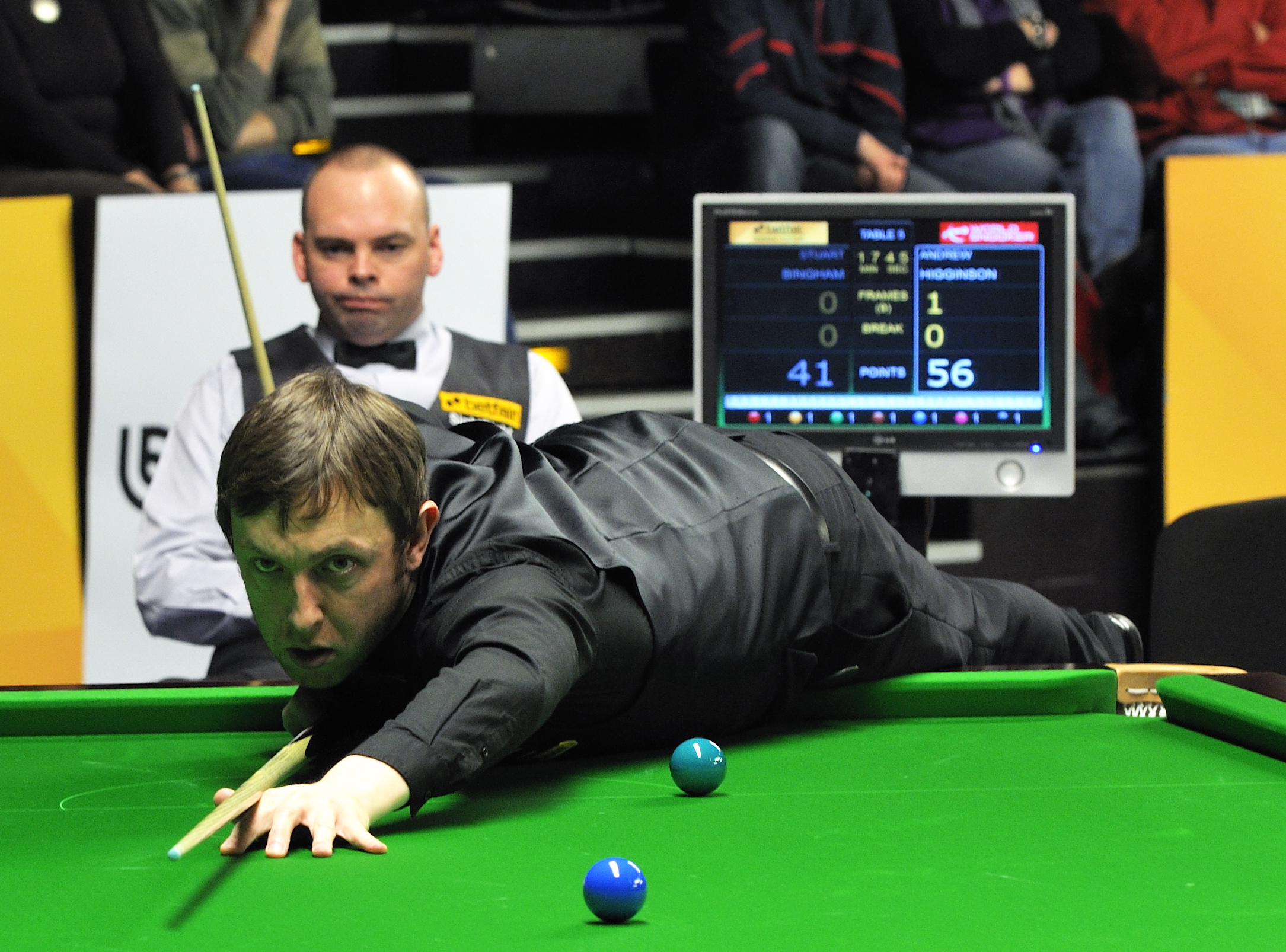
Higginson at the 2013 German Masters

Due to non-entries among the top 16 players, Higginson was automatically seeded into the venue stages of first two major ranking events of the 2012–13 season, Wuxi Classic and Australian Open, only to be beaten on both occasions by Robert Milkins and Ryan Day respectively. He was then whitewashed by Steve Davis in the qualifying for Shanghai Masters, making it three consecutive first round defeats for him. Higginson broke the streak by beating David Gilbert to reach the main draw of the International Championship, but was beaten 0–6 by Shaun Murphy in the first round at the venue in Chengdu, China. He suffered yet another whitewash in UK Championship qualifying, losing 0–6 to Liang Wenbo, and as a result fell to No. 29 in the world rankings. Higginson enjoyed more success in the minor-ranking Players Tour Championship events, reaching the semi-finals in Event One and European Tour Event Five; in the latter tournament he lost 3–4 to Anthony McGill on a respotted black, despite having been 3–1 ahead at one point and his opponent having needed two snookers in the decider. Higginson went on to finish 13th on the PTC Order of Merit to qualify for the Grand Final for the third year in a row.

Higginson's form improved in the second half of the season as he qualified for five of the six remaining ranking tournaments of the season. His best results were last 16 appearances at the German Masters and the Welsh Open: in Germany he beat Stuart Bingham 5–1 before losing by the same scoreline to Neil Robertson, and in Wales he beat Michael Wasley 4–2 before losing 1–4 to Judd Trump. At the PTC Finals Higginson was leading eventual tournament winner Ding Junhui 3–1 in the first round, before losing 3–4. His season however ended in disappointment as he was beaten 4–10 by Michael White in the final round of World Championship Qualifying, to finish it ranked world number 22.

=== 2013/14 ===
Higginson beat Steve Davis 5–1 in the first round of the 2013 Wuxi Classic, before losing 5–2 against Peter Lines. He was defeated in the qualifying round for the Australian Goldfields Open and, despite another win over Davis to qualify, was beaten 5–4 in the wildcard round of the Shanghai Masters by Lin Shuai. Higginson exited the Indian Open in the last 32 and the UK Championship in the last 64. Higginson won two matches in a ranking event for the only time this season at the Welsh Open with victories over Martin O'Donnell and Jimmy Robertson, before Scott Donaldson came from 3–2 down to eliminate him 4–3. Higginson had a very poor season in the eight European Tour events as his best finishes were four last 64 defeats to be placed a lowly 79th on the Order of Merit. He came within a match of qualifying for the World Championship, but lost 10–6 to Dominic Dale. Higginson fell 14 places and outside the top 32 in the rankings during they year to end it 36th in the world.

=== 2014/15 ===
At the Australian Goldfields Open, Higginson was defeated 5–2 by home favourite Neil Robertson in the first round. He won three games to qualify for the Shanghai Masters, but was knocked out in the opening round 5–3 by Mark Allen. A further first round exit followed in the International Championship at the hands of Joe Swail, before Higginson won his first match at the venue stage of a ranking event this season by beating Tian Pengfei 6–3 at the UK Championship. He was eliminated in the second round 6–4 by James Cahill. Higginson qualified for the China Open, but lost 5–3 to Judd Trump in the first round. He reached the final qualifying round for the World Championship thanks to wins over Scott Donaldson and Luca Brecel, and forced a deciding frame from 9–6 against Robert Milkins which he lost. The defeat meant that Higginson has failed to advance beyond the last 32 of any ranking event in over two years. His decline in the rankings continued as he ended the season 48th in the world.

=== 2015/2016 ===
After winning three matches to qualify for the Australian Goldfields Open, Higginson lost 5–3 to Ricky Walden in the first round and he was knocked out in the same stage of the International Championship 6–4 by Liang Wenbo. Another opening round defeat in a ranking came at the UK Championship 6–1 to David Grace. At the Gdynia Open, Higginson defeated five players to reach the semi-finals, but lost 4–2 to Mark Selby. This saw him finish 15th on the Order of Merit and qualify for the Grand Final, where he was knocked out 4–1 by Matthew Selt. Higginson failed to win a match at a ranking event for the sixth time this season when he suffered a 5–3 loss to Yuan Sijun in the wildcard round of the China Open. His ranking slump continued as he was placed 56th in the world.

=== 2016/2017 ===
Higginson won a first round ranking event match for the first time since the 2014 UK Championship by eliminating Mitchell Mann 4–1 at the 2016 Indian Open, but lost 4–2 against Oliver Lines in the second round. He was beaten 4–3 by Robbie Williams in the third round of the Paul Hunter Classic. Higginson qualified for the European Masters by defeating Stephen Maguire 4–3 and Ashley Hugill 4–1 and got to the last 16 of a full ranking event for the first time in over three years by whitewashing Marco Fu 4–0, but then lost 4–0 to Judd Trump. He was edged out 6–5 after being 5–2 up on Joe Perry in the opening round of the International Championship. After knocking out David Gilbert 5–3 and Ricky Walden 5–4 at the China Open, Higginson was close to making the quarter-finals as he was 4–3 ahead of world number one Mark Selby, but went on to lose 5–4.

== Performance and rankings timeline ==
Tournaments	1996/ 97	1997/ 98	1998/ 99	1999/ 00	2000/ 01	2001/ 02	2002/ 03	2003/ 04	2004/ 05	2006/ 07	2007/ 08	2008/ 09	2009/ 10	2010/ 11	2011/ 12	2012/ 13	2013/ 14	2014/ 15	2015/ 16	2016/ 17	2017/ 18	2018/ 19	2019/ 20	2020/ 21	2021/ 22	2022/ 23	2023/ 24	2024/ 25	2026/ 27
Rankings (Note: It shows the ranking at the beginning of the season)	(Note: New players on the Main Tour don't have a ranking)	334	168	(Note: He was an amateur)		93	71	68			44	38	43	32	25	18	22	36	48	56	49	54	57	59	56			82	(Note: Players qualified through Q School started the season without ranking points)
Ranking tournaments
Championship League	Tournament Not Held										Non-Ranking Event													RR	RR	RR	RR	RR	RR
China Open	NH	NR	A	A	LQ	LQ	Not Held		A	LQ	LQ	LQ	1R	LQ	LQ	1R	LQ	1R	WR	3R	1R	2R	Tournament Not Held						LQ
Wuhan Open	Tournament Not Held																										LQ	LQ	LQ
British Open	LQ	A	A	A	1R	LQ	LQ	LQ	A	Tournament Not Held															1R	A	LQ	LQ	LQ
English Open	Tournament Not Held																			2R	4R	1R	1R	4R	LQ	A	1R	1R	LQ
Shenzhen Open (Note: The event was called the Xi'an Grand Prix (2024/2025))	Tournament Not Held																											LQ	LQ
Northern Ireland Open	Tournament Not Held																			2R	1R	4R	3R	1R	LQ	A	LQ	LQ	LQ
International Championship	Tournament Not Held															1R	LQ	1R	1R	1R	1R	1R	3R	Not Held			LQ	1R	LQ
UK Championship	LQ	A	A	A	LQ	LQ	LQ	LQ	A	LQ	LQ	1R	LQ	2R	LQ	LQ	2R	2R	1R	2R	2R	2R	1R	2R	1R	A	LQ	LQ	LQ
Shoot Out	Tournament Not Held													Non-Ranking Event						2R	1R	1R	2R	1R	4R	A	1R	QF	
Scottish Open (Note: The event was called the International Open (1996/1997) and the Players Championship (2003/2004))	LQ	A	A	A	LQ	LQ	LQ	LQ	Tournament Not Held							MR	Not Held			1R	1R	1R	3R	1R	1R	A	2R	LQ	LQ
German Masters (Note: The event was also called the German Open (1996/1997–1997/1998))	LQ	NR	Tournament Not Held											1R	1R	2R	1R	LQ	LQ	LQ	LQ	LQ	LQ	LQ	2R	A	1R	LQ	LQ
Welsh Open	LQ	A	A	A	LQ	LQ	LQ	LQ	A	F	2R	LQ	2R	LQ	LQ	2R	3R	1R	1R	1R	2R	1R	1R	2R	LQ	LQ	WD	1R	
World Grand Prix	Tournament Not Held																	NR	DNQ	DNQ	DNQ	DNQ	DNQ	DNQ	DNQ	DNQ	DNQ	DNQ	
Players Championship (Note: The event was called the Players Tour Championship Grand Final (2010/2011–2015/2016))	Tournament Not Held													2R	SF	1R	DNQ	DNQ	1R	DNQ	DNQ	DNQ	DNQ	DNQ	DNQ	DNQ	DNQ	DNQ	
World Open (Note: The event was also called the Grand Prix (1996/1997–2000/2001 and 2004/2005–2009/2010) and the LG Cup (2001/2002–2003/2004))	LQ	A	A	A	LQ	LQ	LQ	LQ	A	LQ	LQ	1R	LQ	2R	1R	WR	2R	Not Held		1R	1R	2R	LQ	Not Held			LQ	LQ	
Tour Championship	Tournament Not Held																					DNQ	DNQ	DNQ	DNQ	DNQ	DNQ	DNQ	
World Championship	LQ	LQ	LQ	LQ	LQ	LQ	LQ	LQ	LQ	LQ	LQ	1R	LQ	LQ	2R	LQ	LQ	LQ	LQ	LQ	LQ	LQ	LQ	LQ	LQ	LQ	LQ	LQ	
Non-ranking tournaments
The Masters	A	LQ	LQ	LQ	LQ	LQ	LQ	LQ	NH	LQ	LQ	LQ	LQ	A	A	A	A	A	A	A	A	A	A	A	A	A	A	A	
Championship League	Tournament Not Held										A	A	A	RR	RR	RR	RR	A	A	A	A	A	A	A	A	A	A	A	
Former ranking tournaments
Asian Classic	LQ	Tournament Not Held																											
Thailand Masters (Note: The event was also called the Thailand Open (1996/1997))	LQ	A	A	A	LQ	LQ	NR	Not Held			NR	Tournament Not Held																	
Irish Masters	Non-Ranking Event						LQ	LQ	A	Tournament Not Held																			
Northern Ireland Trophy	Tournament Not Held								NR	LQ	LQ	2R	Tournament Not Held																
Bahrain Championship	Tournament Not Held											LQ	Tournament Not Held																
Wuxi Classic (Note: The event was called the Jiangsu Classic (2008/2009–2009/2010))	Tournament Not Held											Non-Ranking Event				1R	2R	LQ	Tournament Not Held										
Australian Goldfields Open	Tournament Not Held														1R	1R	1R	1R	1R	Tournament Not Held									
Shanghai Masters	Tournament Not Held										LQ	LQ	WR	2R	1R	LQ	WR	1R	LQ	LQ	LQ	Non-Ranking		Not Held			Non-Ranking		
Paul Hunter Classic (Note: The event was called the Fürth German Open (2006/2007))	Tournament Not Held								Pro-am Event					Minor-Ranking Event						3R	2R	3R	NR	Tournament Not Held					
Indian Open	Tournament Not Held																2R	LQ	NH	2R	1R	2R	Tournament Not Held						
Riga Masters (Note: The event was called the Riga Open (2014/2015–2015/2016))	Tournament Not Held																	Minor-Rank		1R	QF	LQ	LQ	Tournament Not Held					
China Championship	Tournament Not Held																			NR	1R	LQ	1R	Tournament Not Held					
WST Pro Series	Tournament Not Held																							RR	Tournament Not Held				
Turkish Masters	Tournament Not Held																								2R	Tournament Not Held			
Gibraltar Open	Tournament Not Held																		MR	1R	1R	4R	2R	2R	1R	Tournament Not Held			
WST Classic	Tournament Not Held																									1R	Not Held		
European Masters (Note: The event was called the European Open (1996/1997 and 2001/2002–2003/2004), the Irish Open (1998/1999) and the Malta Cup (2005/2006–2007/2008))	LQ	NH	A	Not Held		LQ	LQ	LQ	A	2R	NR	Tournament Not Held								2R	LQ	2R	LQ	2R	1R	2R	1R	Not Held	
Saudi Arabia Masters	Tournament Not Held																											2R	NH
Former non-ranking tournaments
Masters Qualifying Event (Note: The event was also called the Benson & Hedges Championship (1990/1991–2002/2003))	A	LQ	3R	4R	1R	3R	2R	3R	NH	LQ	3R	QF	F	Tournament Not Held															
General Cup (Note: The event was called the General Cup International (2004/2005–2011/2012))	Tournament Not Held								A	Not Held			A	NH	A	A	RR	A	A	Tournament Not Held									
Shoot Out	Tournament Not Held													2R	1R	QF	QF	1R	QF	Ranking Event									
Six-red World Championship (Note: The event was called the Six-red Snooker International (2008/2009) and the Six-red World Grand Prix (2009/2010))	Tournament Not Held											A	A	A	NH	2R	2R	A	A	A	A	A	A	Not Held		A	Not Held		

Performance Table Legend
LQ	lost in the qualifying draw	#R	lost in the early rounds of the tournament (WR = Wildcard round, RR = Round robin)	QF	lost in the quarter-finals
SF	lost in the semi-finals	F	lost in the final	W	won the tournament
DNQ	did not qualify for the tournament	A	did not participate in the tournament	WD	withdrew from the tournament

NH / Not Held	means an event was not held.
NR / Non-Ranking Event	means an event is/was no longer a ranking event.
R / Ranking Event	means an event is/was a ranking event.
MR / Minor-Ranking Event	means an event is/was a minor-ranking event.

== Career finals ==
=== Ranking finals: 1 ===
Outcome	No.	Year	Championship	Opponent in the final	Score
Runner-up	1.	2007	Welsh Open	(Australia) Neil Robertson	8–9

=== Minor-ranking finals: 1 (1 title) ===
Outcome	No.	Year	Championship	Opponent in the final	Score
Winner	1.	2011	Players Tour Championship – Event 5	(Scotland) John Higgins	4–1

=== Non-ranking finals: 3 (1 title) ===
Outcome	No.	Year	Championship	Opponent in the final	Score
Winner	1.	2000	UK Tour - Event 2	(Scotland) Scott MacKenzie	6–3
Runner-up	1.	2009	Masters Qualifying Event	(England) Rory McLeod	1–6
Runner-up	2.	2012	HK Spring Trophy	(England) Mark Selby	1–6

=== Amateur events ===
- North West Championship (1998, 1999)
- Merseyside Junior Championship (1997)
- North West Pairs Championship (1996)
- North West Junior Championship (1995)
