= Alfie Burden =

English snooker player (born 1976)

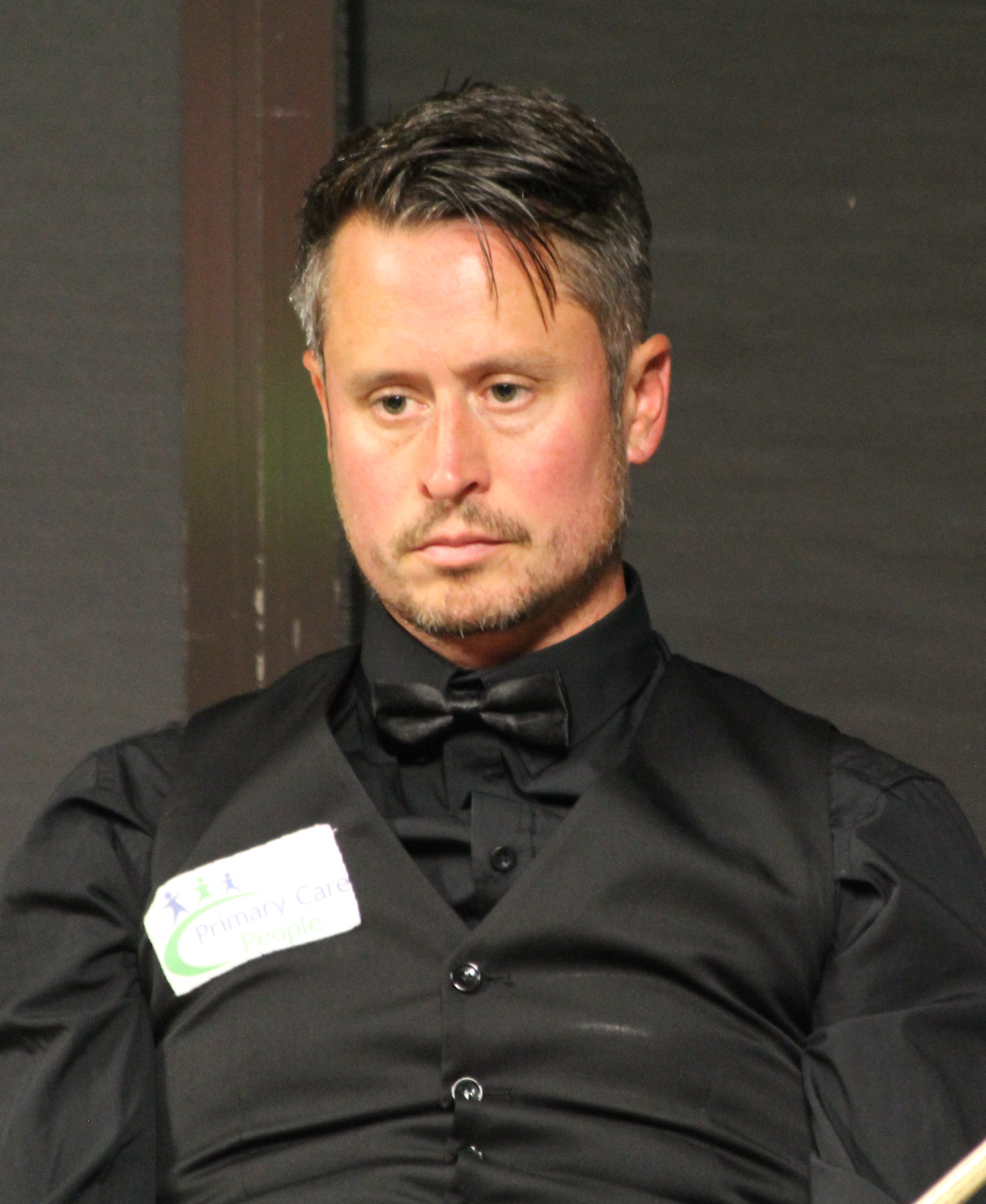
- Burden at the 2016 Paul Hunter Classic

Personal information
- Born: 14 December 1976 (age 49) London, England

Sport
- Country: England
- Sport: Snooker
- Professional: 1994–2008, 2010–2020, 2021–2025, 2026–present
- Highest ranking: 38 (2001/02–2002/03)
- Current ranking: 109 (as of 7 November 2026)
- Maximum breaks: 1
- Century breaks: 140 (as of 17 November 2026)

Tournament wins
- Ranking: 1

Alfred Burden (born 14 December 1976) is an English professional snooker player from London. He first turned professional in 1994 and reached his highest world ranking of 38th in the 2001–02 and 2002–03 seasons. He has won one ranking event, the 2025 Snooker Shoot Out; with this win he became the oldest first time winner of a ranking tournament at the age of 48 years and 364 days old. He has made one maximum break in professional competition.

Burden was the winner of the 2025 World Seniors Championship, beating Aaron Canavan 8–4 in the final. He had previously lost 3–5 to Jimmy White in the 2023 final.

== Career ==
Burden originally had his eyes set on making a career as a professional footballer, but a broken leg curtailed this ambition. He spent a couple of seasons at Arsenal F.C. as a schoolboy apprentice, but was with Swindon Town F.C. at the time of the injury. Burden qualified for the World Championship in 1998. He was defeated by world number 11 Tony Drago by 8–10.

In the 2006–07 season, Burden qualified for the China Open. He defeated Shokat Ali, Rod Lawler and former top-16 player David Gray to qualify for the tournament but lost in the wild-card round to Chinese player Mei Xiwen, 2–5. He dropped off the main tour after the 2007/08 season.

On 25 November 2009 he won the IBSF World Snooker Championship in Hyderabad, India, beating Brazilian Igor Figueiredo 10–8 in the final. With this he earned a place on the 2010/2011 professional main tour and did well enough over that and the following season to end 2011/12 ranked world number 60, inside the top 64 who retained their places for the 2012–13 season.

In the 2012/2013 season, he competed in several minor-ranking Players Tour Championship events. In the Second Event he beat Andrew Higginson, James Wattana, Barry Hawkins, Robert Milkins and Ryan Day to reach the semi-finals. There, he was defeated 1–4 by Martin Gould. In the European Tour Event 3 played in Antwerp, Belgium, Burden beat Gareth Allen, Joe Swail and Mark King, before losing 3–4 to Neil Robertson in the last 16. These results, together with three other last 32 defeats, helped Burden to 23rd place on the PTC Order of Merit, just inside the top 26 who qualified for the Finals. In the Finals, Burden beat world number one Judd Trump 4–3, clinching the match with a 116 break to reach the last 16, the joint furthest he has ever been in a ranking event and the first since 2000. Burden subsequently lost 2–4 to Xiao Guodong in the last 16. He then reached the final round of World Championship Qualifying with wins over Paul Davison and Dave Harold, but lost 5–10 to Dominic Dale to end the season ranked world number 53.

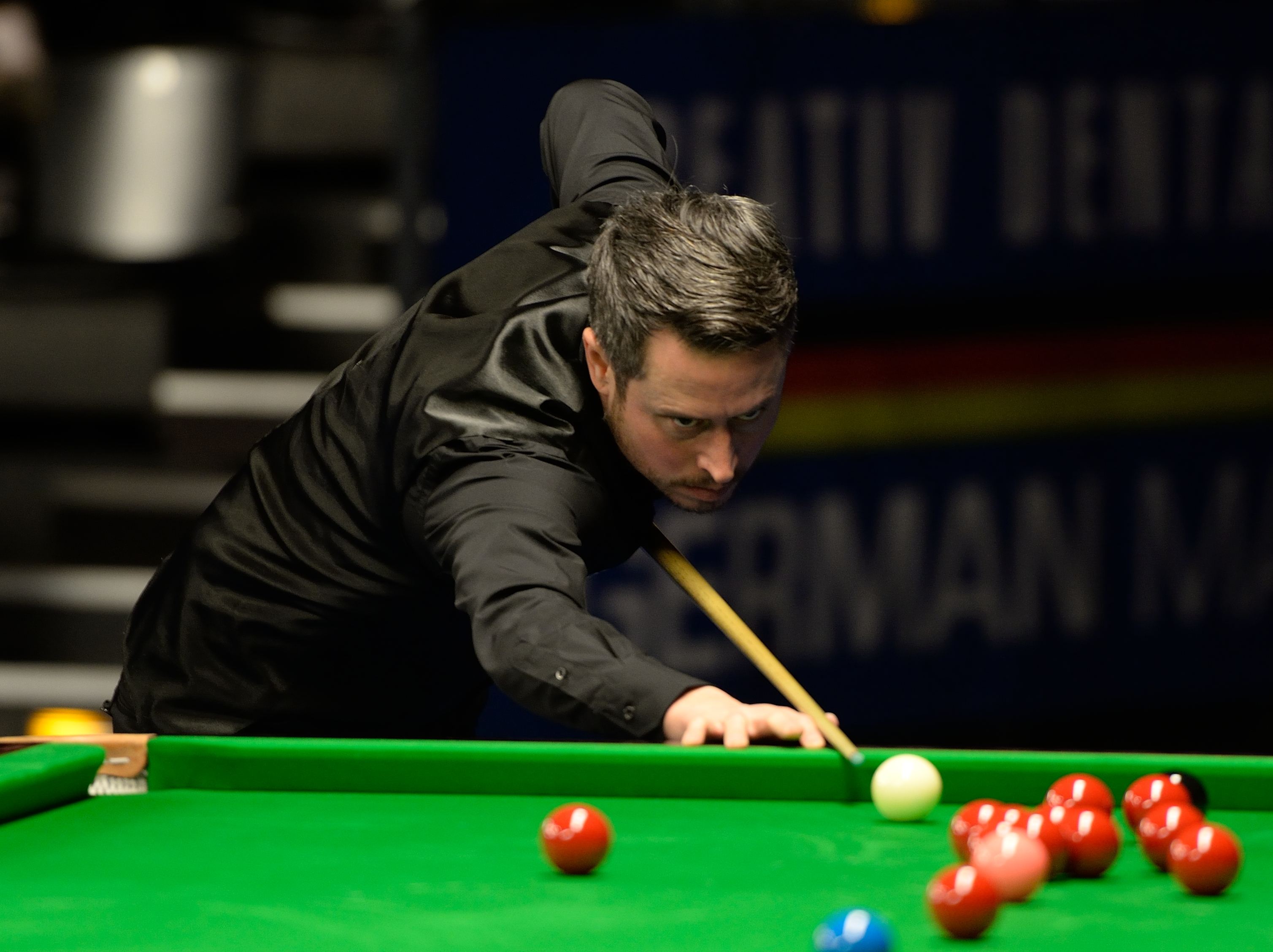
Alfie Burden at 2015 German Masters

Burden qualified for the first round of the 2013 Wuxi Classic to begin the 2013–14 season, but lost 5–2 to Ali Carter in the opening round. He saw off three players to reach the first round of the Australian Goldfields Open and then beat Michael Holt 5–2 to match his best ever performance in a ranking event. In the last 16 he lost 5–3 against Mark Davis. At the European Tour event, the Gdynia Open, Burden won four matches but was then defeated 4–3 by Sam Baird in the quarter-finals. He finished 34th on the Order of Merit, nine places outside of qualifying for the Finals. Burden got through to the second round of the China Open courtesy of Tony Drago's withdrawal and then lost 5–3 to Jimmy White.

Burden won just two matches in his first eight events of the 2014–15 season but then won four matches to advance to the quarter-finals of the Xuzhou Open, where he lost 4–2 to Tom Ford. He beat David Grace 5–3 and Sam Baird 5–4 in qualifying for the German Masters. Burden defeated Michael Georgiou 5–3 in the first round, closing the match with a 112 break, but fell short of reaching the first ranking event quarter-final of his career as Ryan Day knocked him out 5–2. He ended the season 67th in the world rankings which would have relegated him from the tour, but his Asian Tour performances earned him a new two-year card.

Burden reached the first ranking event quarter-final of his career in the 2016 China Open courtesy of victories over Robbie Williams, Joe Perry, Rhys Clark and Rory McLeod, where he lost 5–1 to Stephen Maguire. He held a 9–5 advantage over Ryan Day in the second round of World Championship qualifying, before being defeated 10–9.

Burden edged out Ryan Day 4–3 to qualify for the 2016 European Masters and then beat Yu Delu 4–1 and Ricky Walden 4–3 to play in his second career ranking event quarter-final, where he lost 4–0 to Mark Selby.

Four successive wins saw Burden reach the quarter-finals of the minor ranking 2017 Gibraltar Open, where he lost 4–2 to Michael White.

In December 2016 Burden scored his first 147 Maximum Break in competition, coming against Daniel Wells in the English Open. Burden went on to lose the match 4-3 but came away with £12,000 prize money on account of his high break.

In January 2017, Burden was found guilty of placing bets totalling £25,000 on snooker matches including those he had played in. He had bet on himself to win and over the 86 bets in 10 years he had lost £2,995. Burden was fined £5,000 and given a six-month ban, which would only have come into force if he had bet on snooker again before January 2018. His second quarter-final of the season came at the Gibraltar Open and he made breaks of 131 and 109 to force a deciding frame with Nigel Bond, but lost it.

Burden went into Qualifying for the 2018 World Championships in danger of losing his place on the Tour and in need of a good showing to retain his place. He achieved this, clinching the deciding frame in the second round of qualifying to beat higher-ranked player David Gilbert 10-9 and secure his place on the Tour for two more years, despite having finished the season outside the top 64, on account of his performances in the 2017/18 season. Burden lost out to Thepchaiya Un-Nooh 10–8 in the final round of qualifying and thus failed to emulate his achievement of 1998 in reaching the last 32 and a place at snooker's biggest stage, the Crucible Theatre.

In December 2018 Burden defeated former world champions Peter Ebdon and John Higgins on his way to reaching the quarter-finals of the Scottish Open. In rounds 2 and 3 he came back from 3–0 down to win 4–3 against Marco Fu and Zhang Yong, respectively. In the quarter-finals he suffered a 5–0 loss to the eventual tournament winner Mark Allen.

Burden announced his retirement from snooker on 2 September 2020. However, he returned to Q School in May 2021 and was successful in Event Two, winning a two-year Tour Card.

In December 2025, Burden, aged 48, won his first ever ranking event on the World Snooker Tour as an amateur top-up player. He defeated Stuart Bingham in the final of the Snooker Shoot Out. Afterwards, he said: "I've had a 30-year career and it has been mainly downs - I've underperformed - but tonight is a night for me." With the winnings from the Shoot Out, he secured another two seasons on the main tour through the one-year earnings list from the 2026-27 season.

== Personal life ==
Burden and fellow main tour player Hammad Miah currently co-own the Hertford Snooker Club, having acquired the club in 2024.

== Performance and rankings timeline ==
Tournament	1994/ 95	1995/ 96	1996/ 97	1997/ 98	1998/ 99	1999/ 00	2000/ 01	2001/ 02	2002/ 03	2003/ 04	2004/ 05	2005/ 06	2006/ 07	2007/ 08	2008/ 09	2009/ 10	2010/ 11	2011/ 12	2012/ 13	2013/ 14	2014/ 15	2015/ 16	2016/ 17	2017/ 18	2018/ 19	2019/ 20	2021/ 22	2022/ 23	2023/ 24	2024/ 25	2025/ 26	2026/ 27
Ranking (Note: It shows the ranking at the beginning of the season)	(Note: New players don't have a ranking)	262	186	122	77	61	50	38	38	59	70	70	67	74	(Note: He was an amateur)			57	60	53	50	(Note: Players qualified through Asian Tour Order of Merit started the season without prize money ranking points)	65	60	(Note: Players qualified One Year Ranking List started the season without ranking points)	77		89	(Note: Players qualified through the Q School started the season without ranking points)	79		
Ranking tournaments
Championship League	Tournament Not Held													Non-Ranking Event													WD	RR	RR	RR	2R	RR
China Open (Note: The event was called the China International (1997/1998–1998/1999))	Not Held			NR	LQ	LQ	LQ	LQ	Not Held		LQ	LQ	WR	LQ	A	A	LQ	LQ	LQ	2R	2R	QF	1R	LQ	LQ	Tournament Not Held						LQ
Wuhan Open	Tournament Not Held																												1R	LQ	A	LQ
British Open	LQ	LQ	LQ	LQ	1R	1R	LQ	1R	LQ	LQ	LQ	Tournament Not Held															1R	LQ	LQ	1R	A	LQ
English Open	Tournament Not Held																						1R	1R	1R	2R	LQ	LQ	LQ	LQ	A	LQ
Shenzhen Open (Note: The event was called the Xi'an Grand Prix (2024/2025–2025/2026))	Tournament Not Held																													1R	A	LQ
Northern Ireland Open	Tournament Not Held																						1R	1R	1R	1R	2R	LQ	1R	LQ	A	1R
International Championship	Tournament Not Held																		LQ	LQ	LQ	LQ	LQ	LQ	3R	LQ	Not Held		LQ	LQ	A	LQ
UK Championship	LQ	LQ	LQ	LQ	LQ	1R	LQ	LQ	LQ	LQ	LQ	LQ	LQ	LQ	A	A	LQ	LQ	LQ	1R	2R	1R	1R	1R	1R	1R	1R	LQ	LQ	LQ	A	
Shoot Out	Tournament Not Held																Non-Ranking Event						3R	1R	WD	1R	1R	2R	2R	2R	W	
Scottish Open (Note: The event was called the International Open (1994/1995–1996/1997) and the Players Championship (2003/2004))	LQ	LQ	LQ	LQ	1R	2R	1R	LQ	2R	LQ	Tournament Not Held								MR	Not Held			1R	2R	QF	2R	LQ	LQ	1R	LQ	A	
German Masters (Note: The event was called the German Open (1995/1996–1997/1998))	NH	LQ	LQ	LQ	NR	Tournament Not Held											LQ	LQ	LQ	LQ	2R	1R	LQ	LQ	LQ	LQ	LQ	LQ	LQ	1R	A	LQ
Welsh Open	LQ	LQ	LQ	LQ	LQ	1R	LQ	1R	LQ	LQ	LQ	2R	LQ	LQ	A	A	LQ	LQ	LQ	2R	2R	2R	2R	1R	1R	2R	LQ	LQ	LQ	LQ	A	
World Grand Prix	Tournament Not Held																				NR	DNQ	DNQ	DNQ	DNQ	DNQ	DNQ	DNQ	DNQ	DNQ	DNQ	
Players Championship (Note: The event was called the Players Tour Championship Grand Final (2010/2011–2015/2016))	Tournament Not Held																DNQ	DNQ	DNQ	DNQ	DNQ	DNQ	DNQ	DNQ	DNQ	DNQ	DNQ	DNQ	DNQ	DNQ	DNQ	
World Open (Note: The event was called the Grand Prix (1994/1995–2000/2001 and 2004/2005–2009/2010) and the LG Cup (2001/2002–2003/2004))	LQ	LQ	LQ	3R	LQ	LQ	2R	2R	LQ	2R	LQ	LQ	LQ	LQ	A	A	LQ	LQ	LQ	1R	Not Held		1R	1R	LQ	2R	Not Held		LQ	1R	A	
Tour Championship	Tournament Not Held																								DNQ	DNQ	DNQ	DNQ	DNQ	DNQ	DNQ	
World Championship	LQ	LQ	LQ	1R	LQ	LQ	LQ	LQ	LQ	LQ	LQ	LQ	LQ	LQ	A	A	LQ	LQ	LQ	LQ	LQ	LQ	LQ	LQ	LQ	LQ	LQ	LQ	LQ	LQ	LQ	
Non-ranking tournaments
Champion of Champions	Tournament Not Held																			A	A	A	A	A	A	A	A	A	A	A	1R	1R
The Masters	LQ	LQ	LQ	LQ	LQ	LQ	LQ	LQ	LQ	LQ	A	LQ	LQ	LQ	A	A	A	A	A	A	A	A	A	A	A	A	A	A	A	A	A	
Championship League	Tournament Not Held													A	A	A	A	A	A	A	A	A	A	A	A	RR	A	A	A	A	A	
World Seniors Championship	Tournament Not Held																A	A	A	A	A	A	A	A	A	A	A	F	A	W	2R	
Former ranking tournaments
Asian Classic (Note: The event was called the Dubai Classic (1994/1995) and the Thailand Classic (1995/1996))	LQ	LQ	LQ	Tournament Not Held																												
Malta Grand Prix	Non-Ranking Event					2R	NR	Tournament Not Held																								
Thailand Masters (Note: The event was called the Thailand Open (1994/1995–1996/1997))	LQ	LQ	LQ	LQ	LQ	LQ	1R	LQ	NR	Not Held			NR	Tournament Not Held																		
Irish Masters	Non-Ranking Event								LQ	LQ	LQ	NH	NR	Tournament Not Held																		
Northern Ireland Trophy	Tournament Not Held											NR	LQ	LQ	A	Tournament Not Held																
Wuxi Classic (Note: The event was called the Jiangsu Classic (2008/2009–2009/2010))	Tournament Not Held														Non-Ranking Event				LQ	LQ	LQ	Tournament Not Held										
Australian Goldfields Open (Note: The event was called the Australian Open (1994/1995–1995/1996) and the Australian Masters (1995/1996))	Non-Ranking		Tournament Not Held															LQ	LQ	2R	LQ	LQ	Tournament Not Held									
Shanghai Masters	Tournament Not Held													LQ	A	LQ	LQ	LQ	LQ	LQ	LQ	LQ	LQ	1R	Non-Ranking		Not Held		Non-Ranking Event			
Paul Hunter Classic (Note: The event was called the Grand Prix Fürth (2004/2005) and the Fürth German Open (2005/2006–2006/2007))	Tournament Not Held										Pro-am Event						Minor-Ranking Event						1R	2R	3R	NR	Tournament Not Held					
Indian Open	Tournament Not Held																			LQ	LQ	NH	1R	1R	LQ	Tournament Not Held						
Riga Masters (Note: The event was called the Riga Open (2014/2015–2015/2016))	Tournament Not Held																				Minor-Rank		LQ	LQ	1R	LQ	Tournament Not Held					
China Championship	Tournament Not Held																						NR	1R	LQ	LQ	Tournament Not Held					
Turkish Masters	Tournament Not Held																										LQ	Tournament Not Held				
Gibraltar Open	Tournament Not Held																					MR	QF	4R	1R	2R	1R	Tournament Not Held				
WST Classic	Tournament Not Held																											1R	Tournament Not Held			
European Masters (Note: The event was called the European Open (1994/1995-1996/1997 and 2001/2002-2003/2004), the Irish Open (1998/1999) and the Malta Cup (2004/2005–2007/2008))	LQ	LQ	LQ	NH	LQ	Not Held		1R	LQ	LQ	LQ	LQ	LQ	NR	Tournament Not Held								QF	2R	1R	1R	1R	LQ	1R	Not Held		
Saudi Arabia Masters	Tournament Not Held																													3R	A	NH
Former non-ranking tournaments
Finnish Masters	NH	QF	Tournament Not Held																													
Shoot Out	Tournament Not Held																2R	2R	1R	3R	4R	A	Ranking Event									

Performance Table Legend
LQ	lost in the qualifying draw	#R	lost in the early rounds of the tournament (WR = Wildcard round, RR = Round robin)	QF	lost in the quarter-finals
SF	lost in the semi-finals	F	lost in the final	W	won the tournament
DNQ	did not qualify for the tournament	A	did not participate in the tournament	WD	withdrew from the tournament
DQ	disqualified from the tournament				

NH / Not Held	event was not held.
NR / Non-Ranking Event	event is/was no longer a ranking event.
R / Ranking Event	event is/was a ranking event.
MR / Minor-Ranking Event	means an event is/was a minor-ranking event.
PA / Pro-am Event	means an event is/was a pro-am event.

== Career finals ==
=== Ranking finals: 1 (1 title) ===
Outcome	No.	Year	Championship	Opponent in the final	Score
Winner	1.	2025	Snooker Shoot Out	(England) Stuart Bingham	1–0

=== Non-ranking finals: 2 (1 title) ===
Outcome	No.	Year	Championship	Opponent in the final	Score
Winner	1.	1998	UK Tour - Event 1	(Wales) Anthony Davies	6–5
Runner-up	1.	1998	UK Tour - Event 2	(Northern Ireland) Joe Swail	1–6

=== Seniors finals: 7 (4 titles) ===
Outcome	No.	Year	Championship	Opponent in the final	Score
Runner-up	1.	2023	World Seniors Championship	(England) Jimmy White	3–5
Winner	1.	2024	Seniors Tour – Event 1	(England) Wayne Townsend	4–3
Runner-up	2.	2024	Seniors Tour – Event 9	(Jamaica) Rory McLeod	1–4
Winner	2.	2025	World Seniors Golden Ticket Tournament	(England) Matthew Ford	4–3
Winner	3.	2025	World Seniors Championship	(Jersey) Aaron Canavan	8–4
Winner	4.	2025	Seniors Tour – Event 1	(Jersey) Aaron Canavan	4–1
Runner-up	3.	2025	Seniors Tour – Event 4	(Northern Ireland) Gerard Greene	3–4

=== Amateur finals: 5 (2 titles) ===
Outcome	No.	Year	Championship	Opponent in the final	Score
Winner	1.	1993	English Under-17 Championship	(England) David Gray	5–2
Runner-up	1.	1993	UK Under-19 Championship	(Wales) Lee Walker	1–4
Runner-up	2.	1993	Pontins Autumn Championship	(England) Adrian Gunnell	2–5
Runner-up	3.	2008	PIOS - Event 5	(England) Chris Norbury	2–6
Winner	2.	2009	IBSF World Snooker Championship	(Brazil) Igor Figueiredo	10–8
