= Rory McLeod (snooker player) =

Jamaican snooker player (born 1971)

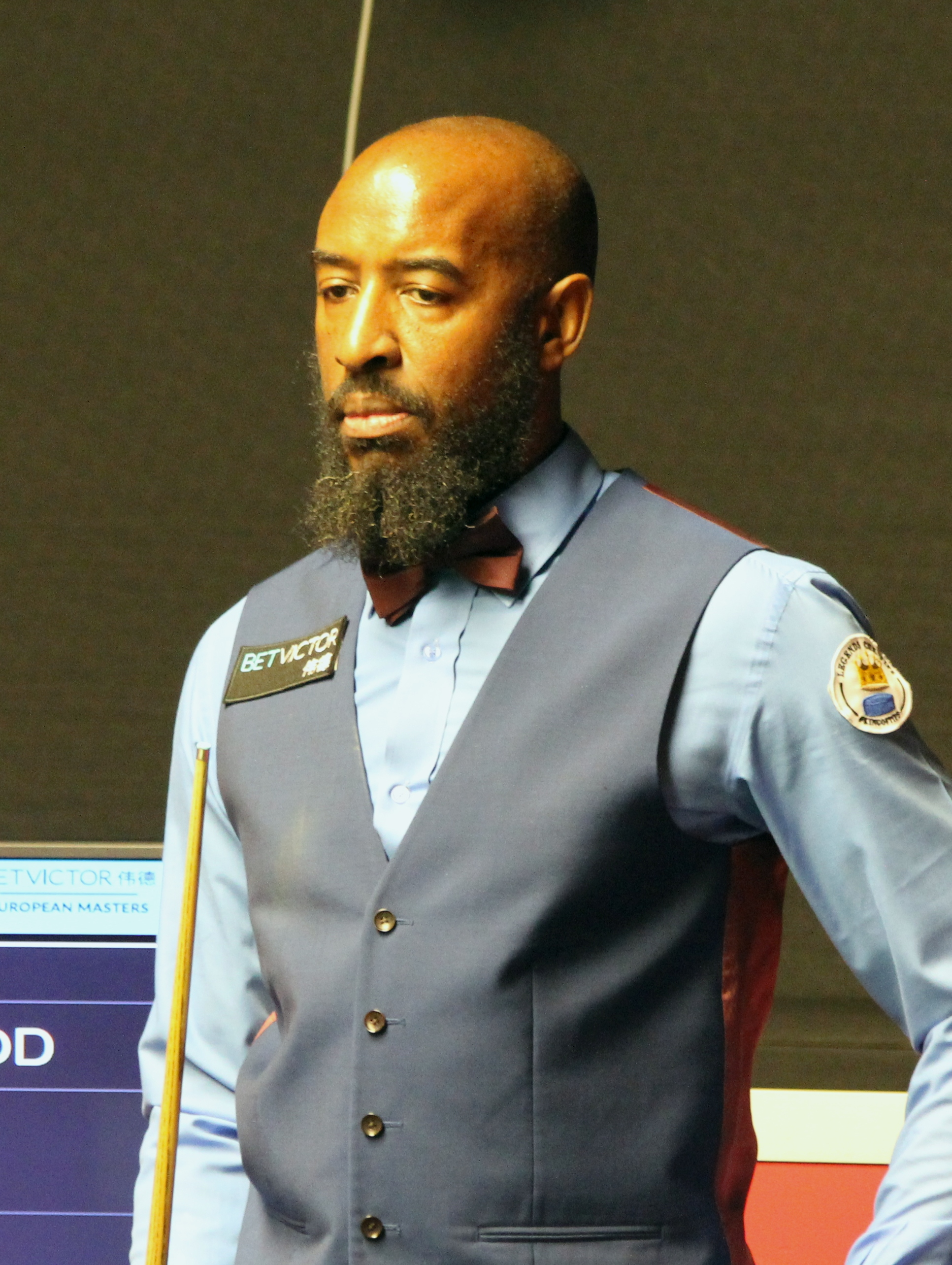
- McLeod at the 2022 European Masters

Personal information
- Nickname: The Highlander
- Born: 26 March 1971 (age 55) Wellingborough, Northamptonshire, England

Sport
- Country: England (until 2019); Jamaica (2019–present)
- Sport: Snooker
- Professional: 1991/1992, 1996/1997, 1998/1999, 2001–2019, 2020–2022
- Highest ranking: 32 (August–September, October, December 2011, February 2012)
- Maximum breaks: 1
- Best ranking finish: Last 16 (x11)

Tournament wins
- Minor-ranking: 1

Rory McLeod (born 26 March 1971) is an English-Jamaican former professional snooker player. He has reached the last 16 in ten ranking tournaments, and his most notable achievement came in 2015, when he won the minor ranking Ruhr Open, beating Tian Pengfei in the final. His highest ranking is 32, which he last reached in 2012.

Having suffered relegation from the main tour at the end of the 2018-2019 season, McLeod spent the 2019-20 season playing on the World Seniors Tour and Challenge Tour; he regained his professional status at the 2020 Q School.

== Career ==
After working for ten years he reached the Main Tour professional ranks for the 2001/2002 season.

McLeod has reached the last 16 of eight ranking tournaments. The first of these was the 2005 Grand Prix although this victory against a noticeably ill Paul Hunter was bittersweet. His best results of 2004/2005 were 2 last-48 runs, the Welsh Open run including a victory over Shaun Murphy. He narrowly missed out on a place in the last 16 of the 2007 Grand Prix, losing on frame difference in his group to Barry Hawkins.

He qualified for the 2008 UK Championship by beating Jimmy White and Dave Harold where he played Ronnie O'Sullivan. He slipped 6–0 down before launching a comeback by winning five consecutive frames (including three successive centuries), but ultimately lost 9–6. Later in the season he defeated Ian McCulloch to qualify for the World Championship for the first time in 2009, becoming the first black player to have done so. He faced Mark King in the first round but despite putting in a resilient performance lost 10–6. However, his performances throughout the season saw him rise to his highest ranking yet of 39.

In 2009 he won the Masters Qualifying Event, beating Andrew Higginson 6–1 in the final, to earn a place at the final stages of the 2010 Masters where he lost 6–3 to Mark Williams. He followed this up by qualifying for the UK Championship, being knocked out in the first round by Neil Robertson.

McLeod qualified for the World Snooker Championship for the second time in 2011, and was drawn against seeded player Ricky Walden in the first round. McLeod won the match 10–6 to set up a second-round match with world No. 1 John Higgins. Walden was more responsible for the pace of the match. McLeod was ultimately defeated by the eventual champion John Higgins 13–7 in the second round.

=== 2011/2012 season ===
McLeod qualified for the 2011 Australian Goldfields Open, and beat Peter Ebdon in the first round 5 frames to 3, before going out to Shaun Murphy in the second round. McLeod qualified for the 2011 UK Championship by beating Barry Hawkins 6–2. He was drawn against three-time UK winner John Higgins and led 4–2 before the scoreline became 5–5. In the deciding frame Higgins "fluked" two balls, one when escaping a snooker and McLeod would ultimately lose the match 6–5. McLeod also reached the China Open where he played Higgins in the first round again and lost 1–5. He finished the season ranked world number 38.

=== 2012/2013 season ===
McLeod qualified for the Australian Goldfields Open and the China Open during the 2012–13 season. In Australia he lost 4–5 in the first round to Stephen Lee and in China he had his best run of the season, beating Hu Hao 5–1 in the wildcard round, Matthew Stevens 5–2 in the first round, before losing 3–5 to Shaun Murphy in the last 16. McLeod played in all 10 of the minor-ranking Players Tour Championship events, with his best finish coming at the fifth European Tour Event, where he lost 0–4 by John Higgins in the quarter-finals. He finished 36th on the PTC Order of Merit, outside of the top 26 who qualified for the Finals. McLeod ended the season by losing 9–10 to Sam Baird in the third round of World Championship Qualifying, to be placed at number 45 in the world rankings.

=== 2013/2014 season ===
McLeod lost 5–3 to Mark King in the first round of the 2013 Wuxi Classic and 5–2 to Robert Milkins in the second round of the Australian Goldfields Open to start the 2013–14 season. He qualified for three other Chinese ranking events during the year, losing in the first round of the International Championship and China Open. At the World Open, McLeod came through a wildcard round match against Zhao Xintong and then narrowly beat Tom Ford 5–4, before world number one Neil Robertson knocked him out 5–1.

=== 2014/2015 season ===
McLeod was beaten 5–4 by Michael Holt after having been 4–2 ahead in the first round of the 2014 Wuxi Classic. He defeated Lee Walker, Andrew Pagett and Ken Doherty on his way to qualifying for the Australian Goldfields Open and lost 5–2 to Judd Trump in the opening round. McLeod failed to qualify for the next two ranking events, before knocking out Ian Burns 6–2 and Zhang Anda 6–5 at the UK Championship. His second last 32 match of the season went into the early hours and it was Matthew Selt who ended McLeod's tournament with a 6–4 win. McLeod met Ronnie O'Sullivan in the second round of the Welsh Open after seeing off Andrew Pagett 4–2. He led 2–0, before O'Sullivan won four unanswered frames. The final ranking event McLeod could qualify for this year was the Indian Open where he lost 4–1 to Ricky Walden in the first round. McLeod kept a hold of his tour place at the end of the season as he was the world number 62, just inside the top 64 who remain.

There was some controversy during the Welsh Open due to his Isis Business Solutions sponsorship badge. The logo worn by McLeod since 2001 consisted of the word `ISIS' in large letters and a small-print URL underneath. Some viewers thought he was sponsored by, or demonstrating support for, the Islamic State.

=== 2015/2016 season ===
McLeod began 2015–16 by playing in the Australian Goldfields Open, where he beat Nigel Bond 5–2 before losing 5–4 to Jack Lisowski in the last 64. He progressed to the last 16 at the next event, the Riga Open, overcoming German amateur Roman Dietzel 4–1, Irishman Fergal O'Brien 4–0 and Hammad Miah 4–2, but lost at this stage 4–2 to eventual finalist Tom Ford. He reached the last 48 at the Shanghai Masters, losing to Alan McManus, and was eliminated in the first round of the International Championship, 6–1 by Daniel Wells.

However, at the Ruhr Open, McLeod defeated Craig Steadman, Jamie Jones, Mark King, Ben Woollaston, Mark Davis and the resurgent Mike Dunn to reach the final of a ranking event for the first time in his career, 24 years after making his professional debut. There, he faced China's Tian Pengfei, whom he defeated 4–2 to win his second professional title. The €25,000 winner's prize is the highest amount he has earned from a single tournament in his career. It also gained him entry to the Champion of Champions for the first time, but lost 4–0 by Neil Robertson in the opening round after returning from burying his mum in Jamaica . After McLeod lost 6–5 to Jamie Cope in the UK Championship first round he said that he had not felt like the same person since his tournament win. Another first round deciding frame defeat came in the German Masters to Kyren Wilson and McLeod also lost in the second round of the Welsh Open 4–1 to Judd Trump. His debut appearance at the PTC Finals ended at the first hurdle as Dunn beat him 4–1. McLeod did reach the third round of the China Open by knocking out Mitchell Mann 5–0 and Dunn 5–2, but lost 5–1 to Alfie Burden.

=== 2016/2017 season ===
McLeod lost in the last 32 of the Riga Masters and Indian Open 4–1 to Anthony McGill and 4–2 to Barry Hawkins. It took until the penultimate ranking event of the season to reach the same stage again when he beat Liang Wenbo 5–2 and Mike Dunn 5–3 at the China Open. He was defeated 5–3 by Hossein Vafaei in the last 16. A pair of 10–7 victories over Darryl Hill and Sydney Wilson moved McLeod one win away from qualifying for the World Championship and he took the first seven frames against Hammad Miah. Miah then rallied to be 7–6 down, but McLeod would win 10–7. At the Crucible he drew Judd Trump, a man who went into the tournament proclaiming that "I honestly believe I can play to a standard which is very rare nowadays," and that he was "the best" in the world. He won the first four frames, but McLeod, at 46 the oldest player in the event, responded brilliantly to take a 5–4 lead. McLeod went on to claim a famous 10–8 victory against a player ranked 52 places above him in the rankings and said it was the biggest win of his career. He lost 13–3 to Stephen Maguire in the second round with a session to spare and said the hype from his win over Trump had distracted him.

=== 2018/2019 season ===
At the UK Championship in December 2018, an impressive stun shot won McLeod the BBC Shot of the Championship.

After being on tour for 18 consecutive years, he dropped off the tour after failing to qualify through Q-School.

=== 2020/2021 season ===
In August 2020 he returned to the pro tour after qualifying through Q-School.

=== 2023/2024 season ===
At the 2023 Northern Ireland Open, McLeod was chosen to replace Ronnie O'Sullivan, as O'Sullivan had withdrawn for health issues. He defeated Ahmed Aly Elsayed in the qualifying rounds 4-0 and went on to beat Ross Muir and Jak Jones both 4-3, before losing to David Gilbert 4-0 in the last-16.

== Personal life ==
McLeod is of Jamaican parentage. He was born in Wellingborough, Northamptonshire, where he attended Victoria Junior School, Westfield Boys School and Sir Christopher Hatton School. He first played snooker seriously at the Embassy Club, Wellingborough, at the age of thirteen, and was also a talented schoolboy footballer. Outside of snooker he has worked as an electronic service man, a barber and a pub landlord.

McLeod, who became Muslim in 2003, lives in Leicester. He also spent time from 2006 to 2011 living in Qatar, where he coached their national snooker team.

== Performance and rankings timeline ==
Tournament	1991/ 92	1992/ 93	1995/ 96	1996/ 97	1997/ 98	1998/ 99	1999/ 00	2000/ 01	2001/ 02	2002/ 03	2003/ 04	2004/ 05	2005/ 06	2006/ 07	2007/ 08	2008/ 09	2009/ 10	2010/ 11	2011/ 12	2012/ 13	2013/ 14	2014/ 15	2015/ 16	2016/ 17	2017/ 18	2018/ 19	2019/ 20	2020/ 21	2021/ 22	2022/ 23	2023/ 24	2024/ 25
Ranking (Note: From the 2010/2011 season it shows the ranking at the beginning of the season)	(Note: New players on the Main Tour don't have a ranking)	(Note: He was an amateur)								88	78	66	49	49	48	44	39	34	35	38	45	53	62	49	41	62			77			
Ranking tournaments
Championship League	Tournament Not Held														Non-Ranking Event													2R	RR	RR	RR	RR
Xi'an Grand Prix	Tournament Not Held																															
Saudi Arabia Masters	Tournament Not Held																															
English Open	Tournament Not Held																							1R	1R	1R	A	2R	1R	A	A	
British Open	LQ	A	LQ	LQ	A	A	A	A	LQ	LQ	LQ	LQ	Tournament Not Held																2R	A	LQ	
Wuhan Open	Tournament Not Held																														A	
Northern Ireland Open	Tournament Not Held																							1R	1R	2R	A	2R	1R	A	3R	
International Championship	Tournament Not Held																			LQ	1R	LQ	LQ	LQ	1R	LQ	A	Not Held			A	
UK Championship	WD	A	A	LQ	A	A	A	A	LQ	LQ	1R	LQ	1R	1R	LQ	1R	1R	1R	1R	LQ	2R	3R	1R	2R	1R	2R	A	1R	1R	A	A	
Shoot Out	Tournament Not Held																	Non-Ranking Event						1R	1R	4R	A	2R	A	2R	1R	
Scottish Open (Note: The event was called the International Open (1992/1993, 1995/1996–1996/1997) and the Players Championship (2003/2004))	NH	A	A	LQ	A	A	A	A	LQ	2R	LQ	Tournament Not Held								MR	Not Held			1R	4R	1R	A	1R	LQ	A	A	
German Masters (Note: The event was called the German Open (1995/1996–1997/1998))	Not Held		A	A	A	NR	Tournament Not Held											LQ	LQ	LQ	LQ	LQ	1R	LQ	LQ	1R	A	LQ	LQ	A	A	
Welsh Open	A	A	A	A	A	A	A	A	1R	LQ	LQ	2R	LQ	LQ	LQ	LQ	LQ	1R	LQ	LQ	2R	2R	2R	2R	2R	1R	A	1R	1R	A	A	
World Open (Note: The event was called the Grand Prix (1991/1992–1992/1993, 1995/1996–2000/2001 and 2004/2005–2009/2010) and the LG Cup (2001/2002–2003/2004))	LQ	A	A	LQ	A	A	A	A	1R	LQ	LQ	LQ	2R	LQ	RR	LQ	LQ	LQ	LQ	LQ	2R	Not Held		LQ	LQ	1R	A	Not Held			LQ	
World Grand Prix	Tournament Not Held																					NR	DNQ	DNQ	DNQ	DNQ	DNQ	DNQ	DNQ	DNQ	DNQ	
Players Championship (Note: The event was called the Players Tour Championship Grand Final (2010/2011–2015/2016))	Tournament Not Held																	DNQ	DNQ	DNQ	DNQ	DNQ	1R	DNQ	DNQ	DNQ	DNQ	DNQ	DNQ	DNQ	DNQ	
Tour Championship	Tournament Not Held																									DNQ	DNQ	DNQ	DNQ	DNQ	DNQ	
World Championship	LQ	A	A	A	LQ	LQ	A	LQ	LQ	LQ	LQ	LQ	LQ	LQ	LQ	1R	LQ	2R	LQ	LQ	LQ	LQ	LQ	2R	LQ	LQ	LQ	LQ	LQ	LQ	A	
Non-ranking tournaments
Champion of Champions	Tournament Not Held																				A	A	1R	A	A	A	A	A	A	A	A	
The Masters	A	LQ	A	LQ	A	A	LQ	LQ	LQ	LQ	LQ	A	LQ	A	LQ	LQ	WR	A	A	A	A	A	A	A	A	A	A	A	A	A	A	
World Seniors Championship	Tournament Not Held																	A	A	A	A	1R	SF	A	A	NH	A	A	QF	A	A	
Former ranking tournaments
Irish Masters	Non-Ranking Event									LQ	LQ	LQ	NH	NR	Tournament Not Held																	
Northern Ireland Trophy	Tournament Not Held												NR	1R	LQ	2R	Tournament Not Held															
Bahrain Championship	Tournament Not Held															LQ	Tournament Not Held															
Wuxi Classic (Note: The event was called the Jiangsu Classic (2008/2009–2009/2010))	Tournament Not Held															Non-Ranking Event				LQ	1R	1R	Tournament Not Held									
Australian Goldfields Open (Note: The event was called the Australian Open (1995/1996) and the Australian Masters (1995/1996))	Not Held		NR	Tournament Not Held															2R	1R	2R	1R	LQ	Tournament Not Held								
Shanghai Masters	Tournament Not Held														LQ	LQ	LQ	LQ	LQ	LQ	LQ	LQ	LQ	LQ	1R	Non-Ranking		Not Held			Non-Ranking	
Paul Hunter Classic (Note: The event was called the Grand Prix Fürth (2004/2005) and the Fürth German Open (2005/2006–2006/2007))	Tournament Not Held											Pro-am Event						Minor-Ranking Event						2R	1R	1R	NR	Tournament Not Held				
Indian Open	Tournament Not Held																				LQ	1R	NH	2R	2R	1R	Tournament Not Held					
China Open (Note: The event was called the China International (1997/1998–1998/1999))	Tournament Not Held				A	A	A	A	LQ	Not Held		LQ	LQ	LQ	LQ	LQ	WR	LQ	1R	2R	1R	LQ	3R	3R	LQ	LQ	Tournament Not Held					
Riga Masters (Note: The event was called the Riga Open (2014/2015–2015/2016))	Tournament Not Held																					Minor-Rank		2R	LQ	1R	A	Tournament Not Held				
China Championship	Tournament Not Held																							NR	1R	LQ	A	Tournament Not Held				
WST Pro Series	Tournament Not Held																											RR	Tournament Not Held			
Turkish Masters	Tournament Not Held																												LQ	Not Held		
Gibraltar Open	Tournament Not Held																						MR	1R	2R	2R	4R	1R	3R	Not Held		
WST Classic	Tournament Not Held																													1R	Not Held	
European Masters (Note: The event was called the European Open (1991/1992–1992/1993, 1995/1996–1996/1997 and 2001/2002–2003/2004), the Irish Open (1998/1999) and the Malta Cup (2004/2005–2007/2008))	A	A	A	LQ	NH	A	Not Held		LQ	LQ	LQ	LQ	LQ	LQ	NR	Tournament Not Held								LQ	LQ	1R	A	1R	LQ	2R	A	NH
Former non-ranking tournaments
Masters Qualifying Event (Note: The event was also called the Benson & Hedges Championship (1990/1991–2002/2003))	A	MR	A	LQ	A	A	3R	1R	1R	2R	A	NH	SF	A	2R	2R	W	Tournament Not Held														
Shoot Out	Tournament Not Held																	3R	1R	1R	2R	2R	1R	Ranking Event								

Performance Table Legend
LQ	lost in the qualifying draw	#R	lost in the early rounds of the tournament (WR = Wildcard round, RR = Round robin)	QF	lost in the quarter-finals
SF	lost in the semi-finals	F	lost in the final	W	won the tournament
DNQ	did not qualify for the tournament	A	did not participate in the tournament	WD	withdrew from the tournament
DQ	disqualified from the tournament				

NH / Not Held	event was not held.
NR / Non-Ranking Event	event is/was no longer a ranking event.
R / Ranking Event	event is/was a ranking event.
MR / Minor-Ranking Event	means an event is/was a minor-ranking event.
PA / Pro-am Event	means an event is/was a pro-am event.

== Career finals ==
=== Minor-ranking finals: 1 (1 title) ===
Outcome	No.	Year	Championship	Opponent in the final	Score
Winner	1.	2015	Ruhr Open	(China) Tian Pengfei	4–2

=== Non-ranking finals: 1 (1 title) ===
Outcome	No.	Year	Championship	Opponent in the final	Score
Winner	1.	2009	Masters Qualifying Event	(England) Andrew Higginson	6–1

=== Pro-am finals: 1 (1 title) ===
Outcome	No.	Year	Championship	Opponent in the final	Score
Winner	1.	2003	EASB Open Tour – Event 3	(England) Mark Gray	5–2

=== Amateur finals: 2 ===
Outcome	No.	Year	Championship	Opponent in the final	Score
Runner-up	1.	2020	English Amateur Championship	(England) Ben Hancorn	3–5
Runner-up	2.	2024	Q Tour – Event 4	(Poland) Antoni Kowalski	3–5

=== Seniors finals: 2 (2 titles) ===
Outcome	No.	Year	Championship	Opponent in the final	Score
Winner	1.	2024	Seniors Tour – Event 2	(Wales) Phillip Williams	4–1
Winner	2.	2024	Seniors Tour – Event 9	(England) Alfie Burden	4–1
