= 2013 Snooker Shoot-Out =

2013 Betfair Snooker Shoot Out

Tournament information
- Dates: 25–27 January 2013
- Venue: Circus Arena
- City: Blackpool
- Country: England
- Organisation: WPBSA
- Format: Non-ranking event
- Total prize fund: £130,000
- Winner's share: £32,000
- Highest break: Mark Selby (ENG) (125)

Final
- Champion: Martin Gould (ENG)
- Runner-up: Mark Allen (NIR)
- Score: 104–0 (one frame)

The 2013 Shoot Out (officially the 2013 Betfair Snooker Shoot Out) was a professional non-ranking snooker tournament that took place between 25 and 27 January 2013 at the Circus Arena in Blackpool, England. It was played under a variation of the standard rules of snooker.

Barry Hawkins was the defending champion, but he lost 38–58 against Stephen Maguire in the quarter-finals.

Martin Gould won the final 104–0 against Mark Allen.

== Tournament format ==
The tournament was played using a variation of the traditional snooker rules. The draw was randomised before each round. All matches were played over a single frame, each of which lasted up to 10 minutes. The event featured a variable shot clock; shots played in the first five minutes were allowed 15 seconds while the final five had a 10-second timer. All foul shots awarded the opponent a ball in hand. Unlike traditional snooker, if a ball did not hit a cushion on every shot, it was a foul. Rather than a coin toss, a lag was used to choose which player breaks. In the event of a draw, each player received a shot at the blue ball this is known as a "blue ball shootout". The player who potted the ball with the cue ball from inside the D and the blue ball on its spot with the opponent missing won the match.

=== Prize fund ===
The breakdown of prize money for this year is shown below:

- Winner: £32,000
- Runner-up: £16,000
- Semi-finals: £8,000
- Quarter-finals: £4,000
- Last 16: £2,000
- Last 32: £1,000
- Last 64: £500
- Highest break: £2,000
- Total: £130,000

== Tournament draw ==
The draw for round 1 was made on 9 November 2012 and was broadcast live by Talksport. The draw for each round including the semi-finals was random, conducted live at the venue. The shot clock was reduced from 20 to 15 seconds per shot for the first 5 minutes and from 15 to 10 seconds for the last 5 minutes. There was only one century break in the tournament. Mark Selby compiled a 125 break against Ken Doherty in round 1. All times in Greenwich Mean Time. Times for quarter-finals, semi-finals and final are approximate. Players in bold denote match winners.

=== Round one ===
==== 25 January – 18:00 ====
- Steve Davis (ENG) 42–**45** **Barry Hawkins** (ENG)
- **Mark Williams** (WAL) **73**–0 Mike Dunn (ENG)
- Tom Ford (ENG) 11–**63** **Mark Allen** (NIR)
- Stuart Bingham (ENG) 8–**84** **Anthony Hamilton** (ENG)
- Joe Perry (ENG) 17–**64** **Michael White** (WAL)
- **Marcus Campbell** (SCO) **63**–1 Matthew Stevens (WAL)
- Graeme Dott (SCO) 17–**58** **Matthew Selt** (ENG)
- Adam Duffy (ENG) 35–**61** **Jack Lisowski** (ENG)
- David Gilbert (ENG) 43–**48** **Ricky Walden** (ENG)
- **Jamie Jones** (WAL) **67**–9 Mark King (ENG)
- Peter Ebdon (ENG) 6–**31** **Dominic Dale** (WAL)
- **Robert Milkins** (ENG) **43**–30 Ali Carter (ENG)
- Jamie Burnett (SCO) 10–**54** **Michael Holt** (ENG)
- Jimmy White (ENG) 36–**69** **Thepchaiya Un-Nooh** (THA)
- Paul Davison (ENG) 14–**50** **Ben Woollaston** (ENG)
- **Alan McManus** (SCO) **61**–13 Fergal O'Brien (IRL)

==== 26 January – 12:00 ====
- **Mark Selby** (ENG) **125**–0 Ken Doherty (IRL)
- **Nigel Bond** (ENG) **44**–40 Cao Yupeng (CHN)
- Ding Junhui (CHN) 1–**115** **Robbie Williams** (ENG)
- **Mark Davis** (ENG) **52**–29 Yu Delu (CHN)
- Liang Wenbo (CHN) 32–**47** **Stephen Maguire** (SCO)
- Aditya Mehta (IND) 46–**51** **Mark Joyce** (ENG)
- Tian Pengfei (CHN) 61–**65** **Jimmy Robertson** (ENG)
- **Peter Lines** (ENG) **96**–1 John Higgins (SCO)
- **Kurt Maflin** (NOR) **71**–14 Jamie Cope (ENG)
- **Martin Gould** (ENG) **49**–45 Rory McLeod (ENG)
- Shaun Murphy (ENG) 29–**64** **Liu Chuang** (CHN)
- **Dave Harold** (ENG) **67**–0 Rod Lawler (ENG)
- **Gerard Greene** (NIR) **80**–42 Alfie Burden (ENG)
- Andy Hicks (ENG) 40–**52** **Andrew Higginson** (ENG)
- **Anthony McGill** (SCO) **101**–11 Barry Pinches (ENG)
- Xiao Guodong (CHN) 0–**62** **Ryan Day** (WAL)

=== Round two ===
==== 26 January – 18:00 ====
- **Michael Holt** (ENG) **40**–31 Ryan Day (WAL)
- Anthony Hamilton (ENG) 8–**67** **Jimmy Robertson** (ENG)
- **Mark Williams** (WAL) **45**–37 Jamie Jones (WAL)
- **Jack Lisowski** (ENG) **48**–41 Robbie Williams (ENG)
- Mark Davis (ENG) 16–**57** **Kurt Maflin** (NOR)
- **Liu Chuang** (CHN) **58**–18 Ricky Walden (ENG)
- Mark Joyce (ENG) 1–**61** **Martin Gould** (ENG)
- **Mark Allen** (NIR) **65**–8 Peter Lines (ENG)
- **Nigel Bond** (ENG) **67**–33 Mark Selby (ENG)
- **Barry Hawkins** (ENG) **73**–1 Anthony McGill (SCO)
- **Dave Harold** (ENG) **61**–36 Gerard Greene (NIR)
- Alan McManus (SCO) 41–**42** **Thepchaiya Un-Nooh** (THA)
- Marcus Campbell (SCO) 17–**61** **Dominic Dale** (WAL)
- Robert Milkins (ENG) 29–**45** **Andrew Higginson** (ENG)
- Ben Woollaston (ENG) 33–**82** **Michael White** (WAL)
- **Stephen Maguire** (SCO) **59**–30 Matthew Selt (ENG)

=== Round three ===
==== 27 January – 14:00 ====
- **Mark Allen** (NIR) **92**–15 Dominic Dale (WAL)
- **Kurt Maflin** (NOR) **71**–20 Thepchaiya Un-Nooh (THA)
- Jack Lisowski (ENG) 7–**69** **Michael Holt** (ENG)
- **Andrew Higginson** (ENG) **60**–15 Liu Chuang (CHN)
- Nigel Bond (ENG) 24–**88** **Martin Gould** (ENG)
- Jimmy Robertson (ENG) 8–**106** **Mark Williams** (WAL)
- **Barry Hawkins** (ENG) **43**–39 Michael White (WAL)
- Dave Harold (ENG) 1–**32** **Stephen Maguire** (SCO)

=== Quarter-finals ===
==== 27 January – 19:00 ====
- Andrew Higginson (ENG) 28–**45** **Martin Gould** (ENG)
- Barry Hawkins (ENG) 38–**58** **Stephen Maguire** (SCO)
- **Mark Allen** (NIR) **62**–13 Kurt Maflin (NOR)
- Mark Williams (WAL) 28–**36** **Michael Holt** (ENG)

=== Semi-finals ===
==== 27 January – 20:30 ====
- Stephen Maguire (SCO) 53–**60** **Mark Allen** (NIR)
- Michael Holt (ENG) 6–**77** **Martin Gould** (ENG)

=== Final ===
==== 27 January – 21:00 ====
- Mark Allen (NIR) 0–**104** **Martin Gould** (ENG)

=== Final ===
Final: 1 frame. Referee: Colin Humphries; Circus Arena, Blackpool, England, 27 January 2013 – 21:00
| Mark Allen; Northern Ireland | 0–**104** | **Martin Gould**; England |

== Century breaks ==
Only one century break was made during the tournament.

- 125 – Mark Selby
