= 2012 Snooker Shoot-Out =

2012 PartyPoker.com Snooker Shoot Out

Tournament information
- Dates: 27–29 January 2012
- Venue: Circus Arena
- City: Blackpool
- Country: England
- Organisation: WPBSA
- Format: Non-ranking event
- Total prize fund: £130,000
- Winner's share: £32,000
- Highest break: Martin Gould (ENG) (135)

Final
- Champion: Barry Hawkins (ENG)
- Runner-up: Graeme Dott (SCO)
- Score: 61–23 (one frame)

The 2012 Shoot Out (officially the 2012 PartyPoker.com Snooker Shoot Out) was a professional non-ranking snooker tournament that took place between 27 and 29 January 2012 at the Circus Arena in Blackpool, England. It was played under a variation of the standard rules of snooker.

Nigel Bond was the defending champion, but he lost in round one 15–30 against Robert Milkins in a repeat of the 2011 final.

Barry Hawkins won the final 61–23 against Graeme Dott.

== Tournament format ==
The tournament was played using a variation of the traditional snooker rules. The draw was randomised before each round. All matches were played over a single frame, each of which lasted up to 10 minutes. The event featured a variable shot clock; shots played in the first five minutes were allowed 20 seconds while the final five had a 15-second timer. All foul shots awarded the opponent a ball in hand. Unlike traditional snooker, if a ball did not hit a cushion on every shot, it was a foul. Rather than a coin toss, a lag was used to choose which player breaks. In the event of a draw, each player received a shot at the blue ball. This is known as a "blue ball shootout". The player who potted the ball with the cue ball from inside the D and the blue ball on its spot with the opponent missing won the match.

=== Prize fund ===
The breakdown of prize money for this year is shown below:

- Winner: £32,000
- Runner-up: £16,000
- Semi-finals: £8,000
- Quarter-finals: £4,000
- Last 16: £2,000
- Last 32: £1,000
- Last 64: £500
- Highest break: £2,000
- Total: £130,000

== Tournament draw ==
The draw for round 1 was made on 6 November 2011, on the second day of the World Seniors Championship. The draws for each round up to and including the semi-finals were random, conducted live at the venue. All matches were a single frame. All times in Greenwich Mean Time. Times for quarter-finals, semi-finals and final are approximate. Players in bold denote match winners.

=== Round one ===
==== 27 January – 18:00 ====
- **Robert Milkins** (ENG) **30**–15 Nigel Bond (ENG)
- **Mark Williams** (WAL) **72**–0 Steve Davis (ENG)
- **Stephen Maguire** (SCO) **43**–20 Anthony McGill (SCO)
- **Graeme Dott** (SCO) **62**–38 Alan McManus (SCO)
- **Stuart Bingham** (ENG) **77**–22 Liu Song (CHN)
- **John Higgins** (SCO) **62**–16 Judd Trump (ENG)
- **Gerard Greene** (NIR) **36**–27 Jamie Burnett (SCO)
- **Ken Doherty** (IRL) **58**–6 Michael Holt (ENG)
- Ali Carter (ENG) 22–**60** **Matthew Stevens** (WAL)
- **Tom Ford** (ENG) **50**–44 Jimmy Robertson (ENG)
- **Mark Selby** (ENG) **104**–1 Joe Perry (ENG)
- **Mark Allen** (NIR) **46**–19 Rory McLeod (ENG)
- **Martin Gould** (ENG) **62**–46 Peter Ebdon (ENG)
- **Anthony Hamilton** (ENG) **71**–14 Jimmy White (ENG)
- **Mark Davis** (ENG) **78**–16 Mark Joyce (ENG)
- **Stephen Lee** (ENG) **60**–37 Peter Lines (ENG)

==== 28 January – 12:00 ====
- **Tony Drago** (MLT) **97**–0 Andy Hicks (ENG)
- Ding Junhui (CHN) 27–**53** **Barry Hawkins** (ENG)
- Ben Woollaston (ENG) 45–**52** **Alfie Burden** (ENG)
- **Ricky Walden** (ENG) **122**–3 Liu Chuang (CHN)
- Andrew Higginson (ENG) 9–**74** **Liang Wenbo** (CHN)
- Shaun Murphy (ENG) 3–**39** **Fergal O'Brien** (IRL)
- **Marcus Campbell** (SCO) **60**–13 Xiao Guodong (CHN)
- Jamie Cope (ENG) 22–**81** **Ian McCulloch** (ENG) (Note: Originally Jamie Cope was scheduled to play against Neil Robertson, but Robertson withdrew due to a chest infection and was replaced by Ian McCulloch.)
- Mark King (ENG) 31–**39** **Dominic Dale** (WAL)
- Marco Fu (HKG) 21–**24** **Barry Pinches** (ENG)
- **Dave Harold** (ENG) **64**–1 James Wattana (THA)
- **Matthew Selt** (ENG) **66**–0 Rod Lawler (ENG) (Note: Originally Matthew Selt was scheduled to play against Joe Jogia, but Jogia withdrew due to a knee injury, and was replaced by Rod Lawler.)
- **Mike Dunn** (ENG) **50**–37 Michael White (WAL)
- **Stephen Hendry** (SCO) **79**–29 Jack Lisowski (ENG)
- **Jamie Jones** (WAL) **56**–24 Adrian Gunnell (ENG)
- **Ryan Day** (WAL) **73**–23 Joe Swail (NIR)

=== Round two ===
==== 28 January – 18:00 ====
- **Robert Milkins** (ENG) **64**–6 Mike Dunn (ENG)
- **Ryan Day** (WAL) **81**–0 Ian McCulloch (ENG)
- **Dominic Dale** (WAL) **31**–22 Mark Selby (ENG)
- Marcus Campbell (SCO) 27–**56** **Martin Gould** (ENG)
- Fergal O'Brien (IRL) 0–**90** **Barry Hawkins** (ENG)
- **Graeme Dott** (SCO) **85**–0 Ken Doherty (IRL)
- **Stephen Maguire** (SCO) **58**–1 Alfie Burden (ENG)
- **Mark Davis** (ENG) **79**–1 Anthony Hamilton (ENG)
- **Dave Harold** (ENG) **51**–32 Tony Drago (MLT)
- Stuart Bingham (ENG) 8–**78** **Jamie Jones** (WAL)
- Mark Williams (WAL) 28–**50** **Barry Pinches** (ENG)
- Ricky Walden (ENG) 6–**121** **Stephen Lee** (ENG)
- **Gerard Greene** (NIR) **69**–30 Stephen Hendry (SCO)
- **Tom Ford** (ENG) **63**–39 Matthew Selt (ENG)
- **Liang Wenbo** (CHN) **54**–0 Matthew Stevens (WAL)
- John Higgins (SCO) 34–**67** **Mark Allen** (NIR)

=== Round three ===
==== 29 January – 14:00 ====
- Ryan Day (WAL) 23–**39** **Dave Harold** (ENG)
- Robert Milkins (ENG) 7–**110** **Graeme Dott** (SCO)
- Stephen Maguire (SCO) 1–**87** **Barry Hawkins** (ENG)
- **Dominic Dale** (WAL) **49**–33 Stephen Lee (ENG)
- **Martin Gould** (ENG) **135**–0 Jamie Jones (WAL)
- **Tom Ford** (ENG) **42**–0 Gerard Greene (NIR)
- Liang Wenbo (CHN) 41–**43** **Barry Pinches** (ENG)
- **Mark Davis** (ENG) **34**–6 Mark Allen (NIR)

=== Quarter-finals ===
==== 29 January – 19:00 ====
- Dominic Dale (WAL) 0–**95** **Graeme Dott** (SCO)
- Mark Davis (ENG) 12–**77** **Barry Hawkins** (ENG)
- Martin Gould (ENG) 17–**45** **Dave Harold** (ENG)
- Barry Pinches (ENG) 1–**82** **Tom Ford** (ENG)

=== Semi-finals ===
==== 29 January – 20:30 ====
- **Barry Hawkins** (ENG) **56**–30 Dave Harold (ENG)
- Tom Ford (ENG) 38–**56** **Graeme Dott** (SCO)

=== Final ===
Final: 1 frame. Referee:Paul Collier; Circus Arena, Blackpool, England, 29 January 2012 – 21:00
**Barry Hawkins**; England	**61**–23	Graeme Dott; Scotland

== Century breaks ==
A total of two century breaks were made during the tournament.

- 135 – Martin Gould
- 121 – Stephen Lee
