= Matthew Selt =

English snooker player (born 1985)

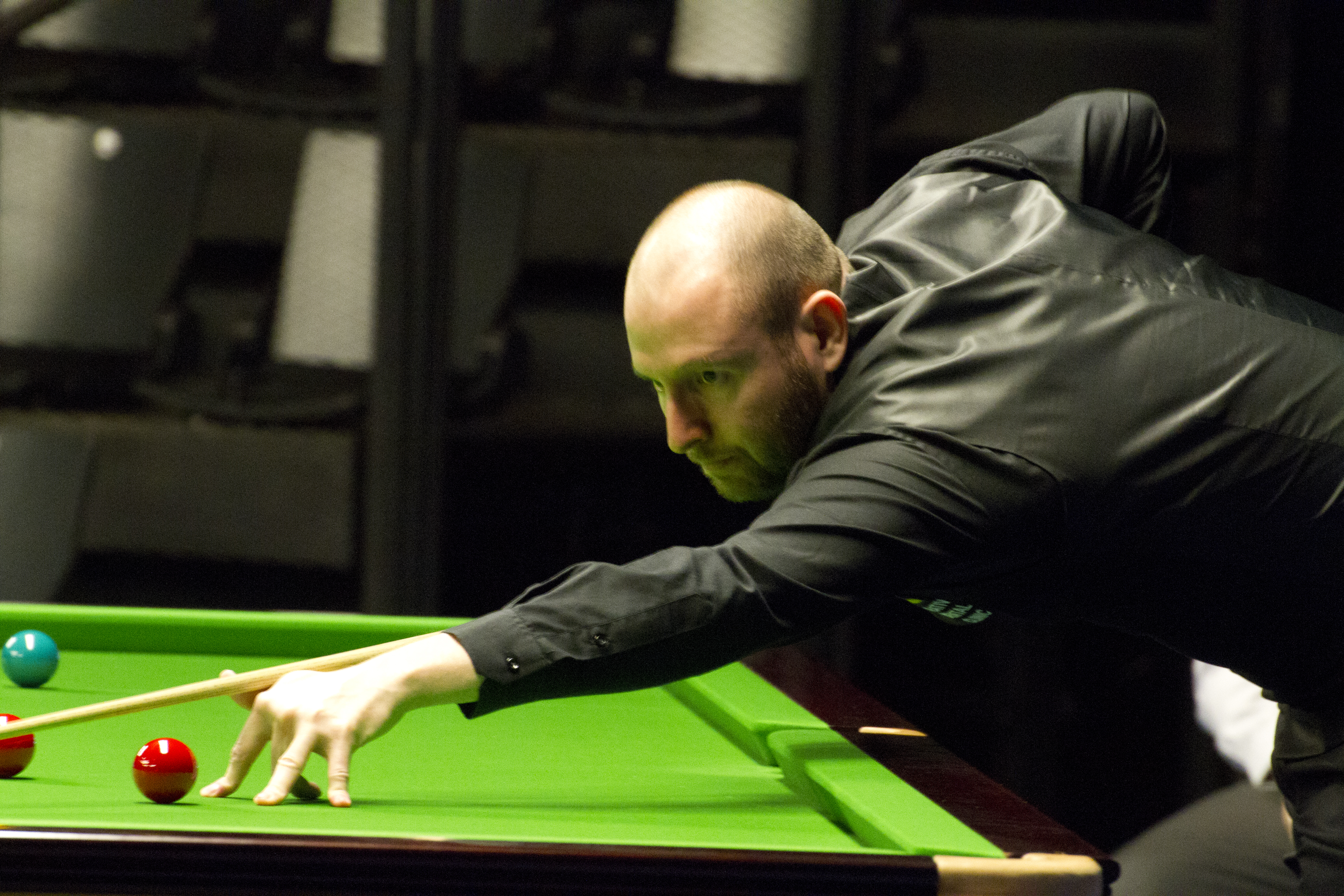
- Selt at the 2015 German Masters

Personal information
- Born: 7 March 1985 (age 41) Romford, London, England

Sport
- Country: England
- Sport: Snooker
- Professional: 2002/2003, 2007–present
- Highest ranking: 20 (February 2016)
- Current ranking: 48 (as of 26 October 2026)
- Maximum breaks: 1
- Century breaks: 232 (as of 4 November 2026)

Tournament wins
- Ranking: 1

Matthew Selt (born 7 March 1985) is an English professional snooker player. He qualified for the professional tour by finishing seventh in the Pontin's International Open Series in 2006/2007. He played in his first professional final in 2014 at the minor-ranking Lisbon Open, which he lost to Stephen Maguire, and has reached five quarter-finals in full ranking events. Selt won his first ranking title when he beat Lyu Haotian in the 2019 Indian Open final. In February 2025, a World Snooker disciplinary inquiry into Selt's behaviour at the 2024 Saudi Masters imposed a suspended sentence of three months, fined him £10,000 and made him pay the governing body's costs in bringing the case; Selt apologised unreservedly for his actions.

== Career ==
In 2008, Selt was cleared by a WPBSA tribunal over allegations that he had bribed an opponent to lose a match at the 2007 International Open Series.

He made an important breakthrough at the start of the 2009‍–‍10 season by reaching the last 32 of the Shanghai Masters by winning four qualifying matches, ending with a 5–4 victory over Steve Davis. There he faced John Higgins, losing 5–2. He also impressed at the Grand Prix, by recovering from 0–4 against Jordan Brown to win 5–4 and going on to beat Jimmy White, Stuart Pettman and Fergal O'Brien to reach the final stages of a tournament for the second time in succession. There he was drawn against Stephen Hendry who beat him 5–2.

=== 2011–12 season ===
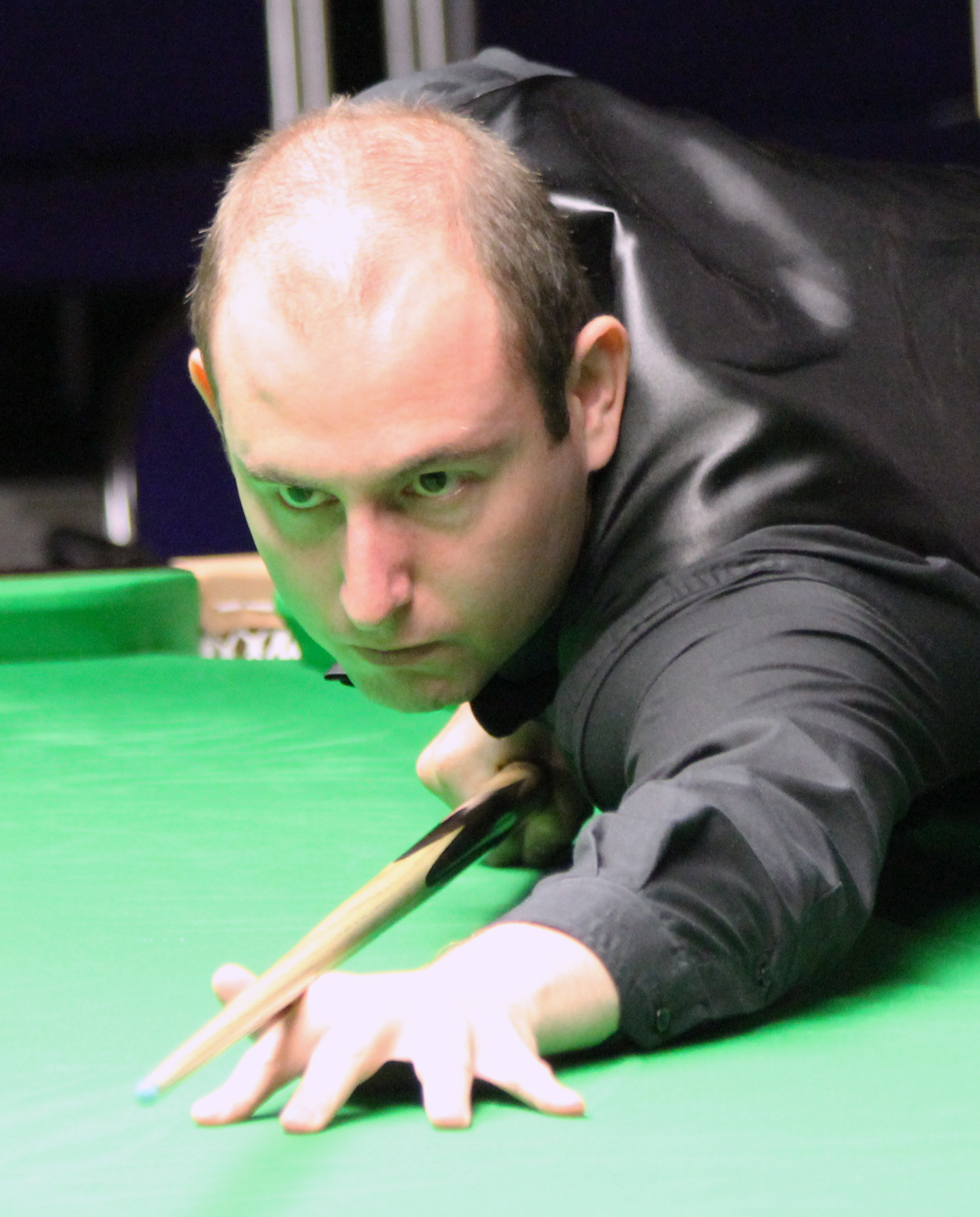
Matthew Selt at the 2012 Paul Hunter Classic

Selt began the 2011–12 season ranked 43rd meaning he would have to win two qualifying matches to reach the ranking event main draws. He did this at the first ranking event of the season: the Australian Goldfields Open by beating Adrian Gunnell and Ricky Walden. In the last 32 he played reigning world champion John Higgins and pulled off the biggest result of his career to date by overcoming a deficit of 1–4, to triumph 5–4 and win a televised match for the first time. He then beat Stephen Hendry 5–1 to earn himself his first ranking event quarter-final, where he lost 3–5 to Shaun Murphy. Selt qualified for the main draw of the UK Championship for the first time in 2011 by defeating Mark King 6–4 in the final round of qualifying. His reward was a tie against former world champion Graeme Dott, who beat him 6–1. He failed to qualify for any of the remaining ranking events and finished the season ranked world number 44.

=== 2012–13 season ===
At the start of the 2012–13 season Selt reached the quarter-finals of the Australian Goldfields Open for the second consecutive season. He beat Thepchaiya Un-Nooh and Jamie Jones in qualifying, and once he reached Australia he came back from 0–2 and 3–4 down to knock out the defending champion Stuart Bingham 5–4. He then defeated Ryan Day 5–3, before losing to Barry Hawkins by the same scoreline in the quarters. Selt struggled after this as he couldn't qualify for eight successive ranking events and only won three matches all year in the eight minor-ranking Players Tour Championship events he entered to finish a lowly 104th on the Order of Merit.

He rediscovered his form in World Championship Qualifying by seeing off Thanawat Thirapongpaiboon 10–8 to be just one match away from reaching the opening round of the tournament for the first time. Selt played 1997 champion Ken Doherty and at 9–4 ahead he looked to be heading to the Crucible with ease. However, Doherty came back to trail 7–9, and when Selt lost the next frame from a position of 55–0 ahead all the momentum was with the Irishman. The match went into a deciding frame with Selt again building a 55–0 lead and this time hanging on to seal his place in the first round, where he met world number one Mark Selby, losing 4–10. He ended the campaign where he started it, ranked world number 44.

=== 2013–14 season ===
Selt failed to qualify for the opening four ranking events of the 2013‍–‍14 season, but then whitewashed Chris Norbury 6–0 to reach the first round of the International Championship, where he lost 6–3 to Martin Gould. His best result by far in the minor-ranking European Tour events came at the final tournament, the Gdynia Open as he whitewashed three opponents 4–0 and beat Judd Trump 4–1 in a televised quarter-final, before losing by the same scoreline to Shaun Murphy in the semis. After the event, Selt stated that he had been neglecting his game for the last two years by occasionally practising two or three hours and that he believed his ranking of 50 would be 20 or 30 places higher if he had played to his true ability. He finished 32nd on the European Order of Merit, seven places outside of qualifying for the Finals. His deepest run in a ranking event this season came after this at the China Open when he beat Ryan Day 5–2, before losing 5–2 to Ali Carter in the last 32.

=== 2014–15 season ===
Selt progressed through to the semi-finals of the Haining Open, losing 4–1 to Stuart Bingham. His first win at the venue stage of a full ranking event this season came courtesy of a 6–0 whitewash over Hammad Miah at the UK Championship. Selt then knocked out Xiao Guodong and Rory McLeod both 6–4 to face Ronnie O'Sullivan in the fourth round. O'Sullivan made a 147 in the final frame as he won 6–0, with Selt saying afterwards that despite having numerous chances throughout the match he never settled. Selt responded in his next event by winning four matches to reach the quarter-finals of the Lisbon Open and then defeated Judd Trump 4–1 and Barry Hawkins 4–2 to play in his first final in a minor-ranking event. He took the opening frame against Stephen Maguire, but went on to lose 4–2. His first quarter-final in a ranking event this season came at the PTC Grand Final after he eliminated Oliver Lines 4–1 and Chris Wakelin 4–2 and he led Mark Williams 3–1, but could not reach the first semi-final of his career as Williams would knock him out in a final frame decider. Selt's season looked to be ending in disappointment as he trailed Jimmy White 7–2 in the second round of World Championship qualifying. However, he took eight of the nine frames upon the resumption of play and won in the final round 10–8 against Tom Ford. In the first round Selt lost another opening session 7–2 this time against Barry Hawkins. He also went on to be 9–4 behind but then won five frames in a row which included back-to-back centuries and a 94 break. He couldn't win his first match at the Crucible Theatre as he lost the deciding frame. Selt finished a season inside the top 32 in the rankings for the first time in his career as he was the world number 30.

=== 2015–16 season ===
In the first round of the 2015 Australian Goldfields Open, Neil Robertson fought back to 4–4 after Selt had been 4–0 up. The deciding frame lasted 55 minutes and Selt took it on the final blue and then edged past Mark Joyce 5–4 to reach the quarter-finals of the event for the third time. He was unable to feature in his first ranking event semi-final as Martin Gould comfortably beat him 5–1. However, Selt rose to a career-high 27th in the world rankings soon afterwards and credited his improvement in play to his coach Chris Henry, his mentor Stephen Hendry, as well as his own personal fitness. He lost 5–4 on the final black to Judd Trump in the second round of the Shanghai Masters. Despite describing his play as pretty terrible, Selt reached the fourth round of the UK Championship and recovered from 3–1 down against Luca Brecel to knock him out 6–4. He also said that his 6–0 loss to Ronnie O'Sullivan a year earlier had improved him as a player. In his first UK quarter-final he was defeated 6–1 by Mark Selby, but the £20,000 in prize money he earned is the biggest of his career so far. O'Sullivan beat Selt 3–0 in the semi-finals of the non-ranking Championship League. He failed to qualify for the World Championship after losing 10–9 to Mitchell Mann in the second qualifying round. His ranking over the course of the season rose five places to world number 25.

=== 2016–17 season ===
Selt overcame Matthew Stevens 5–2 and Sam Craigie 5–4 at the World Open, before losing 5–2 to Anthony McGill in the third round. He only won one match at the venue stage in the next nine ranking events, before reaching the third round of the Gibraltar Open with victories over Rory McLeod and Stephen Maguire. Selt would lose 4–1 to Judd Trump. He could not qualify for the World Championship as he was beaten 10–6 by Hossein Vafaei in the second round.

=== 2017–18 season ===
Selt's best result for the season came in the Gibraltar Open, in which he knocked out Mitchell Mann and Liang Wenbo before losing to Kyren Wilson in the last 16.

=== 2018–19 season: First ranking title ===
Selt secured his maiden ranking title at the Indian Open after beating John Higgins 4–2 in the semi-final and Lyu Haotian 5–3 in the final. He was unable to qualify for the World Snooker Championship after losing 10–4 to Zhao Xintong in the final qualifying round.

=== 2019–20 season ===
In July 2019, Selt reached the semi-final of the Riga Masters after wins over Jimmy Robertson, Lu Ning, and Mark King before being defeated by the eventual champion Yan Bingtao. He failed to qualify for the World Snooker Championship again after being defeated by Kurt Maflin in the final qualifying round, losing 10–1.

=== 2020–21 season ===
Selt reached another semi-final of a ranking event after defeating Stephen Hendry, Barry Hawkins, Kyren Wilson, Soheil Vahedi, and Chris Wakelin before losing to the eventual champion Judd Trump. Most notably, his first-round match against Hendry, the seven-time world champion, was Hendry's first professional match since his retirement in 2012. In April 2021, after dispatching Scott Donaldson 10–3 in the final qualifying round, Selt qualified for the World Snooker Championship for the first time in 6 years. He drew Barry Hawkins in the first round and was defeated 3–10.

=== 2021–22 season ===
In the third round of the 2021 UK Championship, Selt caused a major upset by defeating third seed Judd Trump 6–3; he lost in the next round against Barry Hawkins by a reverse of that scoreline, after having led 3–1. He also reached the quarter-finals of the next ranking event, the Scottish Open, losing in the deciding frame against eventual champion Luca Brecel. At the inaugural Turkish Masters, Selt reached the second ranking final of his career, notably defeating a resurgent Ding Junhui 6–5 in the semi-final. However, he lost in the final against Trump by a scoreline of 4–10. Selt reached the final qualifying round of the World Championship where he faced Thepchaiya Un-Nooh whom he had beaten in all previous professional encounters; however, from leading 6–4, Selt went on to lose 7–10.

== Performance and rankings timeline ==
Tournament	2001/ 02	2002/ 03	2003/ 04	2004/ 05	2007/ 08	2008/ 09	2009/ 10	2010/ 11	2011/ 12	2012/ 13	2013/ 14	2014/ 15	2015/ 16	2016/ 17	2017/ 18	2018/ 19	2019/ 20		2020/ 21	2021/ 22	2022/ 23	2023/ 24	2024/ 25	2025/ 26	2026/ 27
Ranking (Note: It shows the ranking at the beginning of the season)	(Note: He was an amateur)	(Note: New players on the Main Tour don't have a ranking)				68	67	51	43	44	44	48	30	25	37	59	34		26	30	21	28	37	34	43
Ranking tournaments
Championship League	Tournament Not Held				Non-Ranking Event														2R	2R	RR	RR	RR	3R	RR
China Open	A	Not Held		A	LQ	LQ	LQ	LQ	LQ	LQ	2R	1R	2R	1R	LQ	1R	Tournament Not Held								1R
Wuhan Open	Tournament Not Held																					2R	1R	3R	LQ
British Open	A	LQ	A	A	Tournament Not Held															3R	LQ	2R	LQ	1R	LQ
English Open	Tournament Not Held													2R	2R	3R	3R		2R	LQ	2R	QF	2R	2R	2R
Shenzhen Open (Note: The event was called the Xi'an Grand Prix (2024/2025–2025/2026))	Tournament Not Held																						QF	1R	LQ
Northern Ireland Open	Tournament Not Held													1R	2R	1R	2R		3R	LQ	1R	2R	2R	1R	3R
International Championship	Tournament Not Held									LQ	1R	1R	1R	1R	2R	1R	1R		Not Held			1R	LQ	LQ	LQ
UK Championship	A	LQ	A	A	LQ	LQ	LQ	LQ	1R	LQ	1R	4R	QF	1R	2R	2R	1R		2R	4R	1R	2R	1R	LQ	
Shoot Out	Tournament Not Held							Non-Ranking Event						1R	2R	2R	1R		1R	4R	1R	1R	1R	1R	
Scottish Open (Note: The event was called the Players Championship (2003/2004))	A	LQ	A	Tournament Not Held						MR	Not Held			1R	1R	1R	1R		2R	QF	LQ	3R	1R	SF	
German Masters	Tournament Not Held							LQ	LQ	LQ	LQ	1R	A	LQ	2R	LQ	QF		LQ	LQ	LQ	2R	LQ	LQ	
Welsh Open	A	LQ	A	A	1R	LQ	LQ	LQ	LQ	LQ	2R	3R	3R	1R	1R	2R	1R		3R	2R	1R	3R	3R	LQ	
World Grand Prix	Tournament Not Held											NR	1R	DNQ	DNQ	DNQ	2R		DNQ	1R	DNQ	1R	1R	DNQ	
Players Championship (Note: The event was called the Players Tour Championship Grand Final (2010/2011–2015/2016))	Tournament Not Held							DNQ	DNQ	DNQ	DNQ	QF	2R	DNQ	DNQ	DNQ	DNQ		DNQ	DNQ	DNQ	DNQ	DNQ	DNQ	
World Open (Note: The event was called the LG Cup (2001/2002–2003/2004) and the Grand Prix (2004/2005 and 2007/2008–2009/2010))	A	LQ	A	A	LQ	LQ	1R	LQ	LQ	LQ	1R	Not Held		3R	2R	3R	1R		Not Held			LQ	LQ	2R	
Tour Championship	Tournament Not Held															DNQ	DNQ		DNQ	DNQ	DNQ	DNQ	DNQ	DNQ	
World Championship	LQ	LQ	LQ	LQ	LQ	LQ	LQ	LQ	LQ	1R	LQ	1R	LQ	LQ	LQ	LQ	LQ		1R	LQ	1R	LQ	1R	LQ	
Non-ranking tournaments
Champion of Champions	Tournament Not Held										A	A	A	A	A	A	1R		A	A	A	A	A	A	
The Masters	A	LQ	LQ	A	LQ	LQ	LQ	A	A	A	A	A	A	A	A	A	A		A	A	A	A	A	A	
Championship League	Tournament Not Held				A	A	A	A	A	A	A	SF	SF	RR	A	A	RR	RR	RR	RR	RR	RR	2R	2R	
Former ranking tournaments
Irish Masters	NH	LQ	A	A	Tournament Not Held																				
Northern Ireland Trophy	Tournament Not Held				LQ	LQ	Tournament Not Held																		
Bahrain Championship	Tournament Not Held					LQ	Tournament Not Held																		
Wuxi Classic (Note: The event was called the Jiangsu Classic (2008/2009–2009/2010))	Tournament Not Held					Non-Ranking Event				LQ	LQ	1R	Tournament Not Held												
Australian Goldfields Open	Tournament Not Held								QF	QF	LQ	LQ	QF	Tournament Not Held											
Shanghai Masters	Tournament Not Held				LQ	LQ	1R	LQ	LQ	LQ	LQ	WR	2R	1R	1R	Non-Ranking			Not Held			Non-Ranking Event			
Paul Hunter Classic (Note: The event was called the Grand Prix Fürth (2004/2005))	Not Held			Pro-am Event				Minor-Ranking Event						A	1R	2R	NR		Tournament Not Held						
Indian Open	Tournament Not Held										LQ	2R	NH	2R	2R	W	Tournament Not Held								
Riga Masters (Note: The event was called the Riga Open (2014/2015–2015/2016))	Tournament Not Held											Minor-Rank		WD	LQ	LQ	SF		Tournament Not Held						
China Championship	Tournament Not Held													NR	1R	1R	3R		Tournament Not Held						
WST Pro Series	Tournament Not Held																		RR	Tournament Not Held					
Turkish Masters	Tournament Not Held																			F	Tournament Not Held				
Gibraltar Open	Tournament Not Held												MR	3R	4R	1R	1R		SF	1R	Tournament Not Held				
WST Classic	Tournament Not Held																				2R	Tournament Not Held			
European Masters (Note: The event was called the European Open (2001/2002–2003/2004) and the Malta Cup (2004/2005 and 2007/2008))	A	LQ	A	A	NR	Tournament Not Held								LQ	1R	LQ	LQ		2R	LQ	LQ	LQ	Not Held		
Saudi Arabia Masters	Tournament Not Held																						4R	3R	NH
Former non-ranking tournaments
World Grand Prix	Tournament Not Held											2R	Ranking Event												
Shoot Out	Tournament Not Held							1R	2R	2R	3R	1R	1R	Ranking Event											
Paul Hunter Classic	Not Held			Pro-am Event				Minor-Ranking Event						Ranking Event			1R		Tournament Not Held						
Six-red World Championship (Note: The event was called the Six-red Snooker International (2008/2009) and the Six-red World Grand Prix (2009/2010))	Tournament Not Held					3R	A	A	NH	A	A	A	SF	2R	A	A	A		Not Held		RR	Tournament Not Held			
Haining Open	Tournament Not Held											Minor-Rank		W	QF	QF	A		NH	A	A	Tournament Not Held			

Performance Table Legend
LQ	lost in the qualifying draw	#R	lost in the early rounds of the tournament (WR = Wildcard round, RR = Round robin)	QF	lost in the quarter-finals
SF	lost in the semi-finals	F	lost in the final	W	won the tournament
DNQ	did not qualify for the tournament	A	did not participate in the tournament	WD	withdrew from the tournament

NH / Not Held	means an event was not held.
NR / Non-Ranking Event	means an event is/was no longer a ranking event.
R / Ranking Event	means an event is/was a ranking event.
MR / Minor-Ranking Event	means an event is/was a minor-ranking event.
PA / Pro-am Event	means an event is/was a pro-am event.

== Career finals ==
=== Ranking finals: 2 (1 title) ===
Outcome	No.	Year	Championship	Opponent in the final	Score
Winner	1.	2019	Indian Open	(China) Lyu Haotian	5–3
Runner-up	1.	2022	Turkish Masters	(England) Judd Trump	4–10

=== Minor-ranking finals: 1 ===
Outcome	No.	Year	Championship	Opponent in the final	Score
Runner-up	1.	2014	Lisbon Open	(Scotland) Stephen Maguire	2–4

=== Non-ranking finals: 2 (1 title) ===
Outcome	No.	Year	Championship	Opponent in the final	Score
Runner-up	1.	2002	WPBSA Open Tour – Event 6	(England) Stuart Bingham	4–5
Winner	1.	2016	Haining Open	(China) Li Hang	5–3

=== Amateur finals: 1 ===
Outcome	No.	Year	Championship	Opponent in the final	Score
Runner-up	1.	2002	English Under-18 Championship	(England) Gary Wilson	5–8
