= 2015 Snooker Shoot-Out =

2015 Betway Snooker Shoot Out

Tournament information
- Dates: 4–6 March 2015
- Venue: Circus Arena
- City: Blackpool
- Country: England
- Organisation: WPBSA
- Format: Non-ranking event
- Total prize fund: £130,000
- Winner's share: £32,000
- Highest break: Martin Gould (ENG) (116)

Final
- Champion: Michael White (WAL)
- Runner-up: Xiao Guodong (CHN)
- Score: 54–48 (one frame)

The 2015 Shoot Out (officially the 2015 Betway Snooker Shoot Out) was a professional non-ranking snooker tournament that took place between 4–6 March 2015 at the Circus Arena in Blackpool. It was played under a variation of the standard rules of snooker.

Dominic Dale was the defending champion, but he lost 20–65 against Luca Brecel in round one.

Michael White won his first professional title by defeating Xiao Guodong 54–48 in the final.

== Tournament format ==
The tournament was played using a variation of the traditional snooker rules. The draw was randomised before each round. All matches were played over a single frame, each of which lasted up to 10 minutes. The event featured a variable shot clock; shots played in the first five minutes were allowed 15 seconds while the final five had a 10-second timer. All foul shots awarded the opponent a ball in hand. Unlike traditional snooker, if a ball did not hit a cushion on every shot, it was a foul. Rather than a coin toss, a lag was used to choose which player breaks. In the event of a draw, each player received a shot at the blue ball this is known as a "blue ball shootout". The player who potted the ball with the cue ball from inside the D and the blue ball on its spot with the opponent missing won the match.

=== Prize fund ===
The breakdown of prize money for this year is shown below:

- Winner: £32,000
- Runner-up: £16,000
- Semi-final: £8,000
- Quarter-final: £4,000
- Last 16: £2,000
- Last 32: £1,000
- Last 64: £500
- Highest break: £2,000
- Total: £130,000

== Tournament draw ==
The random draw for round one was made on 12 February 2015 and was broadcast live by Talksport. There were two century breaks during the tournament. Martin Gould made a 116 break in round two, and Shaun Murphy made a 105 break in round three.

All times in Greenwich Mean Time. Times for quarter-finals, semi-finals and final are approximate. Players in bold denote match winners.

=== Round 1 ===
==== 4 March – 18:00 ====
- **Luca Brecel** (BEL) **65**–20 Dominic Dale (WAL)
- Matthew Selt (ENG) 23–**69** **Judd Trump** (ENG)
- **Rory McLeod** (ENG) **49**–21 Nigel Bond (ENG)
- **Shaun Murphy** (ENG) **66**–6 Jamie Burnett (SCO)
- Alan McManus (SCO) 18–**58** **Anthony Hamilton** (ENG)
- Joe Swail (NIR) 50–**53** **Barry Hawkins** (ENG)
- Mark Joyce (ENG) 34–**46** **Jamie Jones** (WAL)
- Stephen Maguire (SCO) 9–**53** **Sam Baird** (ENG)
- **Tom Ford** (ENG) **71**–37 Jack Lisowski (ENG)
- **Graeme Dott** (SCO) **77**–13 Jimmy Robertson (ENG)
- **Rod Lawler** (ENG) **75**–25 Gerard Greene (NIR)
- John Higgins (SCO) 0–**123** **Mark Williams** (WAL)
- **Fraser Patrick** (SCO) **61**–52 Mark Davis (ENG)
- **Joe Perry** (ENG) **51**–30 Mike Dunn (ENG)
- Marcus Campbell (SCO) 1–**76** **Chris Wakelin** (ENG)
- Dechawat Poomjaeng (THA) 36–**61** **Jimmy White** (ENG)

==== 5 March – 12:00 ====
- Mark Selby (ENG) 19–**52** **Anthony McGill** (SCO)
- Ken Doherty (IRL) 17–**77** **Alfie Burden** (ENG)
- **Aditya Mehta** (IND) **69**–54 Noppon Saengkham (THA)
- Thepchaiya Un-Nooh (THA) 0–**104** **Mark Allen** (NIR)
- **Kyren Wilson** (ENG) **36**–27 Kurt Maflin (NOR)
- **David Morris** (IRL) **78**–0 Matthew Stevens (WAL)
- **Peter Ebdon** (ENG) **16**–10 Gary Wilson (ENG)
- **Martin Gould** (ENG) **62**–11 David Gilbert (ENG)
- **Xiao Guodong** (CHN) **59**–48 Peter Lines (ENG)
- **Ali Carter** (ENG) **21**–9 Mark King (ENG)
- Andrew Higginson (ENG) 0–**94** **Ricky Walden** (ENG)
- Jamie Cope (ENG) 23–**69** **Ben Woollaston** (ENG)
- **Stuart Bingham** (ENG) **65**–8 Fergal O'Brien (IRL)
- **Michael Holt** (ENG) **77**–0 Ryan Day (WAL)
- Robert Milkins (ENG) 0–**75** **Michael White** (WAL)
- Dave Harold (ENG) 16–**81** **Ronnie O'Sullivan** (ENG)

=== Round 2 ===
==== 5 March – 18:00 ====
- **Jamie Jones** (WAL) **42**–38 Stuart Bingham (ENG)
- **Joe Perry** (ENG) **40**–9 Luca Brecel (BEL)
- Ronnie O'Sullivan (ENG) 0–**55** **Tom Ford** (ENG)
- **Martin Gould** (ENG) **117**–0 Rory McLeod (ENG)
- **Sam Baird** (ENG) **56**–51 Ricky Walden (ENG)
- **Alfie Burden** (ENG) **52**–38 Fraser Patrick (SCO)
- **Barry Hawkins** (ENG) **89**–4 Anthony McGill (SCO)
- **Michael White** (WAL) **40**–17 Judd Trump (ENG)
- Jimmy White (ENG) 1–**71** **Kyren Wilson** (ENG)
- Graeme Dott (SCO) 16–**60** **Rod Lawler** (ENG)
- Anthony Hamilton (ENG) 42–**77** **Shaun Murphy** (ENG)
- **Xiao Guodong** (CHN) **68**–0 Mark Allen (NIR)
- Chris Wakelin (ENG) 11–**55** **David Morris** (IRL)
- **Ben Woollaston** (ENG) **55**–10 Aditya Mehta (IND)
- Ali Carter (ENG) 15–**48** **Michael Holt** (ENG)
- **Mark Williams** (WAL) **75**–17 Peter Ebdon (ENG)

=== Round 3 ===
==== 6 March – 14:00 ====
- **Kyren Wilson** (ENG) **62**–5 Barry Hawkins (ENG)
- Martin Gould (ENG) 4–**105** **Shaun Murphy** (ENG)
- **Alfie Burden** (ENG) **88**–0 Sam Baird (ENG)
- Joe Perry (ENG) 24–**35** **Ben Woollaston** (ENG)
- Tom Ford (ENG) 16–**107** **Michael White** (WAL)
- **Jamie Jones** (WAL) **50**–12 Mark Williams (WAL)
- **Xiao Guodong** (CHN) **64**–8 David Morris (IRL)
- **Michael Holt** (ENG) **83**–0 Rod Lawler (ENG)

=== Quarter-finals ===
==== 6 March – 19:00 ====
- **Michael White** (WAL) **84**–8 Ben Woollaston (ENG)
- **Jamie Jones** (WAL) **22**–10 Shaun Murphy (ENG)
- **Kyren Wilson** (ENG) **71**–0 Michael Holt (ENG)
- Alfie Burden (ENG) 12–**23** **Xiao Guodong** (CHN)

=== Semi-finals ===
==== 6 March – 20:30 ====
- Jamie Jones (WAL) 18–**19** **Xiao Guodong** (CHN)
- Kyren Wilson (ENG) 53–**76** **Michael White** (WAL)

=== Final ===
Final: 1 frame. Referee: Brendan Moore; Circus Arena, Blackpool, England, 6 March 2015 – 21:00
Xiao Guodong; China	48–**54**	**Michael White**; Wales

== Century breaks ==
Two century breaks were made during the tournament.

- 116 – Martin Gould
- 105 – Shaun Murphy
