= 2014 Snooker Shoot-Out =

2014 888casino Snooker Shoot Out

Tournament information
- Dates: 24–26 January 2014
- Venue: Circus Arena
- City: Blackpool
- Country: England
- Organisation: WPBSA
- Format: Non-ranking event
- Total prize fund: £130,000
- Winner's share: £32,000
- Highest break: Ryan Day (WAL) (101)

Final
- Champion: Dominic Dale (WAL)
- Runner-up: Stuart Bingham (ENG)
- Score: 77–19 (one frame)

The 2014 Shoot Out (officially the 2014 888casino Snooker Shoot Out) was a professional non-ranking snooker tournament that took place between 24 and 26 January 2014 at the Circus Arena in Blackpool. It was played under a variation of the standard rules of snooker.

Martin Gould was the defending champion, but he lost 14–40 against Zhang Anda in round one.

Dominic Dale won the final 77–19 against Stuart Bingham.

== Tournament format ==
The tournament was played using a variation of the traditional snooker rules. The draw was randomised before each round. All matches were played over a single frame, each of which lasted up to 10 minutes. The event featured a variable shot clock; shots played in the first five minutes were allowed 15 seconds while the final five had a 10-second timer. All foul shots awarded the opponent a ball in hand. Unlike traditional snooker, if a ball did not hit a cushion on every shot, it was a foul. Rather than a coin toss, a lag was used to choose which player breaks. In the event of a draw, each player received a shot at the blue ball this is known as a "blue ball shootout". The player who potted the ball with the cue ball from inside the D and the blue ball on its spot with the opponent missing won the match.

=== Prize fund ===
The breakdown of prize money for this year is shown below:

- Winner: £32,000
- Runner-up: £16,000
- Semi-final: £8,000
- Quarter-final: £4,000
- Last 16: £2,000
- Last 32: £1,000
- Last 64: £500
- Highest break: £2,000
- Total: £130,000

== Tournament draw ==
The draw for round one was made on 8 December 2013 and was broadcast live by Talksport. The draw for each round including the semi-finals was made at random, conducted live at the venue.

There was only one century break during the tournament. Ryan Day made a 101 break against Kurt Maflin.

All times in Greenwich Mean Time. Times for quarter-finals, semi-finals and final are approximate. Players in bold denote match winners.

=== Round one ===
==== 24 January – 18:00 ====
- **Zhang Anda** (CHN) **40**–14 Martin Gould (ENG)
- **Cao Yupeng** (CHN) **65**–1 Mark Selby (ENG)
- Anthony Hamilton (ENG) 31–**52** **Ali Carter** (ENG)
- **Barry Hawkins** (ENG) **56**–24 Rod Lawler (ENG)
- Luca Brecel (BEL) 50–**67** **Ben Woollaston** (ENG)
- **Mark King** (ENG) **82**–0 Mark Joyce (ENG)
- **Nigel Bond** (ENG) **62**–47 Jamie Jones (WAL)
- Fergal O'Brien (IRL) 1–**82** **Dominic Dale** (WAL)
- **Liam Highfield** (ENG) **72**–15 Stephen Maguire (SCO)
- **Alfie Burden** (ENG) **103**–4 Paul Davison (ENG)
- Dave Harold (ENG) 52–**53** **Jamie Cope** (ENG)
- **Robbie Williams** (ENG) **54**–29 Jack Lisowski (ENG)
- Mike Dunn (ENG) 29–**34** **Tom Ford** (ENG)
- **David Gilbert** (ENG) **41**–40 Anthony McGill (SCO)
- **Michael White** (WAL) **93**–1 Barry Pinches (ENG)
- Jimmy White (ENG) 32–**51** **Jimmy Robertson** (ENG)

==== 25 January – 12:00 ====
- Mark Williams (WAL) 1–**74** **Mark Allen** (NIR)
- **Rory McLeod** (ENG) **36**–35 Peter Ebdon (ENG)
- **Stuart Bingham** (ENG) **89**–42 Joe Perry (ENG)
- **Jamie Burnett** (SCO) **78**–41 Dechawat Poomjaeng (THA)
- **Kurt Maflin** (NOR) **52**–49 Marcus Campbell (SCO)
- Adam Duffy (ENG) 39–**97** **Matthew Stevens** (WAL)
- Gerard Greene (NIR) 19–**64** **Xiao Guodong** (CHN)
- Peter Lines (ENG) 0–**77** **Michael Holt** (ENG)
- Ian Burns (ENG) 0–**88** **Thepchaiya Un-Nooh** (THA)
- Ricky Walden (ENG) 13–**62** **Mark Davis** (ENG)
- Robert Milkins (ENG) 34–**65** **Shaun Murphy** (ENG)
- **Graeme Dott** (SCO) **29**–22 Aditya Mehta (IND)
- **Matthew Selt** (ENG) **43**–29 John Higgins (SCO)
- Ken Doherty (IRL) 53–**79** **Alan McManus** (SCO)
- **Andrew Higginson** (ENG) **46**–8 Tian Pengfei (CHN)
- Steve Davis (ENG) 33–**84** **Ryan Day** (WAL)

=== Round two ===
==== 25 January – 18:00 ====
- Shaun Murphy (ENG) 0–**85** **Jamie Burnett** (SCO)
- **Ryan Day** (WAL) **56**–53 Michael White (WAL)
- Xiao Guodong (CHN) 30–**41** **Alan McManus** (SCO)
- Jamie Cope (ENG) 8–**62** **Ali Carter** (ENG)
- **Matthew Stevens** (WAL) **53**–20 Nigel Bond (ENG)
- **Thepchaiya Un-Nooh** (THA) **76**–48 Michael Holt (ENG)
- Zhang Anda (CHN) 0–**89** **Stuart Bingham** (ENG)
- Rory McLeod (ENG) 9–**85** **Matthew Selt** (ENG)
- **Andrew Higginson** (ENG) **87**–18 Liam Highfield (ENG)
- Barry Hawkins (ENG) 7–**69** **Dominic Dale** (WAL)
- **Graeme Dott** (SCO) **72**–0 Tom Ford (ENG)
- **Mark Allen** (NIR) **86**–0 Robbie Williams (ENG)
- **Kurt Maflin** (NOR) **82**–20 Cao Yupeng (CHN)
- David Gilbert (ENG) 43–**72** **Mark Davis** (ENG)
- Jimmy Robertson (ENG) 22–**47** **Mark King** (ENG)
- **Alfie Burden** (ENG) **62**–5 Ben Woollaston (ENG)

=== Round three ===
==== 26 January – 14:00 ====
- **Kurt Maflin** (NOR) **59**–10 Jamie Burnett (SCO)
- **Mark Davis** (ENG) **109**–0 Thepchaiya Un-Nooh (THA)
- Mark Allen (NIR) 45–**51** **Dominic Dale** (WAL)
- **Graeme Dott** (SCO) **61**–1 Ali Carter (ENG)
- Alan McManus (SCO) 48–**51** **Matthew Stevens** (WAL)
- **Andrew Higginson** (ENG) **40**–22 Alfie Burden (ENG)
- Mark King (ENG) 1–**59** **Ryan Day** (WAL)
- **Stuart Bingham** (ENG) **82**–6 Matthew Selt (ENG)

=== Quarter-finals ===
==== 26 January – 19:00 ====
- Matthew Stevens (WAL) 33–**34** **Stuart Bingham** (ENG)
- **Dominic Dale** (WAL) **81**–1 Andrew Higginson (ENG)
- Kurt Maflin (NOR) 7–**105** **Ryan Day** (WAL)
- **Graeme Dott** (SCO) **57**–7 Mark Davis (ENG)

=== Semi-finals ===
==== 26 January – 20:30 ====
- Ryan Day (WAL) 6–**64** **Dominic Dale** (WAL)
- Graeme Dott (SCO) 0–**62** **Stuart Bingham** (ENG)

=== Final ===
Final: 1 frame. Referee: Michaela Tabb; Circus Arena, Blackpool, England, 26 January 2014 – 21:00
**Dominic Dale**; Wales	**77**–19	Stuart Bingham; England

== Century breaks ==
Only one century break was made during the tournament.

- 101 – Ryan Day
