= 2011 Snooker Shoot-Out =

2011 CaesarsCasino.com Snooker Shoot Out

Tournament information
- Dates: 28–30 January 2011
- Venue: Circus Arena
- City: Blackpool
- Country: England
- Organisation: WPBSA
- Format: Non-ranking event
- Total prize fund: £130,000
- Winner's share: £32,000
- Highest break: Ronnie O'Sullivan (ENG) (123)

Final
- Champion: Nigel Bond (ENG)
- Runner-up: Robert Milkins (ENG)
- Score: 62–23 (one frame)

The 2011 Shoot Out (officially the 2011 CaesarsCasino.com Snooker Shoot Out) was a professional non-ranking snooker tournament that took place between 28 and 30 January 2011 at the Circus Arena in Blackpool, England. It was played under a variation of the standard rules of snooker.

The event was last held in 1990, where Darren Morgan defeated Mike Hallett 2–1 (frames) in the final.

Nigel Bond won the final 62–23 against Robert Milkins.

== Tournament format ==
The tournament was played using a variation of the traditional snooker rules. The draw was randomised before each round. All matches were played over a single frame, each of which lasted up to 10 minutes. The event featured a variable shot clock; shots played in the first five minutes were allowed 20 seconds while the final five had a 15-second timer. All foul shots awarded the opponent a ball in hand. Unlike traditional snooker, if a ball did not hit a cushion on every shot, it was a foul. Rather than a coin toss, a lag was used to choose which player breaks. In the event of a draw, each player received a shot at the blue ball. This is known as a "blue ball shootout". The player who potted the ball with the cue ball from inside the D and the blue ball on its spot with the opponent missing won the match.

64 players contested the tournament, which was shown on Sky, the first time that Sky has shown a World Snooker event live since 2004.

=== Prize fund ===
The breakdown of prize money for this year is shown below:

- Winner: £32,000
- Runner-up: £16,000
- Semi-finals: £8,000
- Quarter-finals: £4,000
- Last 16: £2,000
- Last 32: £1,000
- Last 64: £500
- Highest break: £2,000
- Total: £130,000

== Tournament draw ==
The draw for round 1 was made on 28 November 2010, just before the final of the Premier League. The draw for each round including the semi-finals was random, made just before the round began. All times in Greenwich Mean Time. Times for quarter-finals, semi-finals and final are approximate. Players in bold denote match winners.
Note: w/d=withdrawn; w/o=walk-over

=== Round one ===
==== 28 January – 18:00 ====
- **Tony Drago** (MLT) **w/o**–w/d Liang Wenbo (CHN)
- Mark Allen (NIR) 31–**74** **Ryan Day** (WAL)
- **Stephen Lee** (ENG) **62**–34 Michael Holt (ENG)
- **Nigel Bond** (ENG) **46**–24 Joe Jogia (ENG)
- Stephen Hendry (SCO) 29–**55** **Fergal O'Brien** (IRE)
- **Robert Milkins** (ENG) **82**–6 Martin Gould (ENG)
- **Andrew Higginson** (ENG) **27**–16 Jamie Burnett (SCO)
- **Tom Ford** (ENG) **84**–0 Stephen Maguire (SCO)
- Ding Junhui (CHN) 15–**71** **Dominic Dale** (WAL)
- Jimmy White (ENG) 28–**62** **Ali Carter** (ENG)
- Michael Judge (IRE) 26–**72** **Alan McManus** (SCO)
- Mark Williams (WAL) 7–**93** **John Higgins** (SCO)
- **Ronnie O'Sullivan** (ENG) **113**–0 Marco Fu (HKG)
- Peter Ebdon (ENG) 24–**72** **Steve Davis** (ENG)
- Jimmy Michie (ENG) 21–**32** **Marcus Campbell** (SCO)
- **Mark King** (ENG) **79**–0 Jimmy Robertson (ENG)

==== 29 January – 12:00 ====
- Barry Pinches (ENG) 15–**106** **Neil Robertson** (AUS)
- **Peter Lines** (ENG) **65**–24 Barry Hawkins (ENG)
- Shaun Murphy (ENG) 28–**30** **Rory McLeod** (ENG)
- **Alfie Burden** (ENG) **106**–0 Matthew Selt (ENG)
- Ricky Walden (ENG) 0–**130** **Joe Perry** (ENG)
- **Judd Trump** (ENG) **52**–31 Dave Harold (ENG)
- **Graeme Dott** (SCO) **99**–16 Matthew Couch (ENG)
- Jamie Cope (ENG) 1–**81** **Ken Doherty** (IRE)
- **Adrian Gunnell** (ENG) **85**–30 David Morris (IRE)
- Gerard Greene (NIR) 38–**55** **Rod Lawler** (ENG)
- Matthew Stevens (WAL) 36–**67** **Mike Dunn** (ENG)
- **Stuart Pettman** (ENG) **41**–35 Bjorn Haneveer (BEL)
- Joe Swail (NIR) 6–**49** **Mark Davis** (ENG)
- Andy Hicks (ENG) 34–**44** **Mark Selby** (ENG)
- **Anthony Hamilton** (ENG) **70**–31 Anthony McGill (SCO)
- **Stuart Bingham** (ENG) **46**–31 Ian McCulloch (ENG)

=== Round two ===
==== 29 January – 18:00 ====
- **Nigel Bond** (ENG) **96**–0 Stephen Lee (ENG)
- Mark Davis (ENG) 30–**31** **Judd Trump** (ENG)
- **Marcus Campbell** (SCO) **67**–1 Andrew Higginson (ENG)
- **Mike Dunn** (ENG) **66**–59 Alfie Burden (ENG)
- **Robert Milkins** (ENG) **54**–9 Tom Ford (ENG)
- **Stuart Bingham** (ENG) **37**–34 Adrian Gunnell (ENG)
- **Rory McLeod** (ENG) **61**–57 Tony Drago (MLT)
- **Mark Selby** (ENG) **89**–6 Stuart Pettman (ENG)
- **Peter Lines** (ENG) **54**–47 John Higgins (SCO)
- Alan McManus (SCO) 49–**50** **Neil Robertson** (AUS)
- Rod Lawler (ENG) 34–**93** **Ronnie O'Sullivan** (ENG)
- Ali Carter (ENG) 48–**57** **Fergal O'Brien** (IRL)
- Dominic Dale (WAL) 15–**52** **Anthony Hamilton** (ENG)
- **Mark King** (ENG) **120**–0 Steve Davis (ENG)
- Joe Perry (ENG) 25–**83** **Ken Doherty** (IRL)
- **Ryan Day** (WAL) **53**–40 Graeme Dott (SCO)

=== Round three ===
==== 30 January – 14:00 ====
- **Mark King** (ENG) **61**–5 Fergal O'Brien (IRL)
- **Nigel Bond** (ENG) **47**–45 Rory McLeod (ENG)
- Stuart Bingham (ENG) 6–**52** **Mike Dunn** (ENG)
- **Judd Trump** (ENG) **39**–37 Peter Lines (ENG)
- Ryan Day (WAL) 22–**48** **Robert Milkins** (ENG)
- **Neil Robertson** (AUS) **63**–13 Ken Doherty (IRL)
- **Ronnie O'Sullivan** (ENG) **129**–0 Mark Selby (ENG)
- **Marcus Campbell** (SCO) **88**–0 Anthony Hamilton (ENG)

=== Quarter-finals ===
==== 30 January – 19:00 ====
- **Robert Milkins** (ENG) **50**–27 Judd Trump (ENG)
- Mark King (ENG) 23–**29** **Nigel Bond** (ENG)
- Neil Robertson (AUS) 49–**57** **Marcus Campbell** (SCO)
- **Ronnie O'Sullivan** (ENG) **94**–14 Mike Dunn (ENG)

=== Semi-finals ===
==== 30 January – 20:30 ====
- **Nigel Bond** (ENG) **55**–14 Marcus Campbell (SCO)
- **Robert Milkins** (ENG) **72**–35 Ronnie O'Sullivan (ENG)

=== Final ===
Final: 1 frame. Referee: Michaela Tabb; Circus Arena, Blackpool, England, 30 January 2011 – 21:00
**Nigel Bond**; England	**62**–23	Robert Milkins; England

== Century breaks ==
A total of four century breaks were made during the tournament.

- 129, 113 – Ronnie O'Sullivan
- 112 – Mark King
- 106 – Alfie Burden
