= Snooker Shoot Out =

Snooker tournament

Tournament information
- Venue: Tower Circus
- Location: Blackpool
- Country: England
- Established: 1990
- Organisation(s): World Snooker Tour
- Format: Ranking event
- Total prize fund: £213,000
- Winner's share: £50,000
- Recent edition: 2025
- Current champion: Alfie Burden (ENG)

The Snooker Shoot Out (sometimes stylised as the Snooker Shootout or simply Shoot Out) is a professional ranking snooker tournament held by the World Snooker Tour at the Tower Circus in Blackpool, England, played under a variation of the standard rules. It was first held in 1990 as the Shoot-Out. The reigning champion is Alfie Burden.

Unlike other major snooker tournaments, each match only consists of one frame, played over a maximum of 10 minutes, with a shot clock in effect; the format allows a player to claim the title by only winning 7 frames of snooker, making it the shortest possible run to win a ranking event. Players do not have to wear waistcoats and bow ties. Also audiences do not have to remain silent during play, and the event is known for its boisterous atmosphere.

The event is also notable for its wildcard entrants, including young amateur players. Liam Davies first competed in 2019 when he was 12 years old, making him the youngest player to feature in a professional ranking event. At the 2023 edition, 14-year-old Vladislav Gradinari became the youngest player to win a televised match at a ranking event, beating Ng On Yee and Victor Sarkis to reach last 32 before losing to Tom Ford; Reanne Evans is the first female player to achieve the same feat.

== History ==
Single frame snooker competition was a staple of early televised coverage of the sport, and largely responsible for bringing the game to the mainstream of British sport, primarily through the BBC's popular Pot Black programme. Extended televised coverage of longer professional tournaments, however, had caused the format to become jaded, with the last Pot Black tournament taking place in 2007.

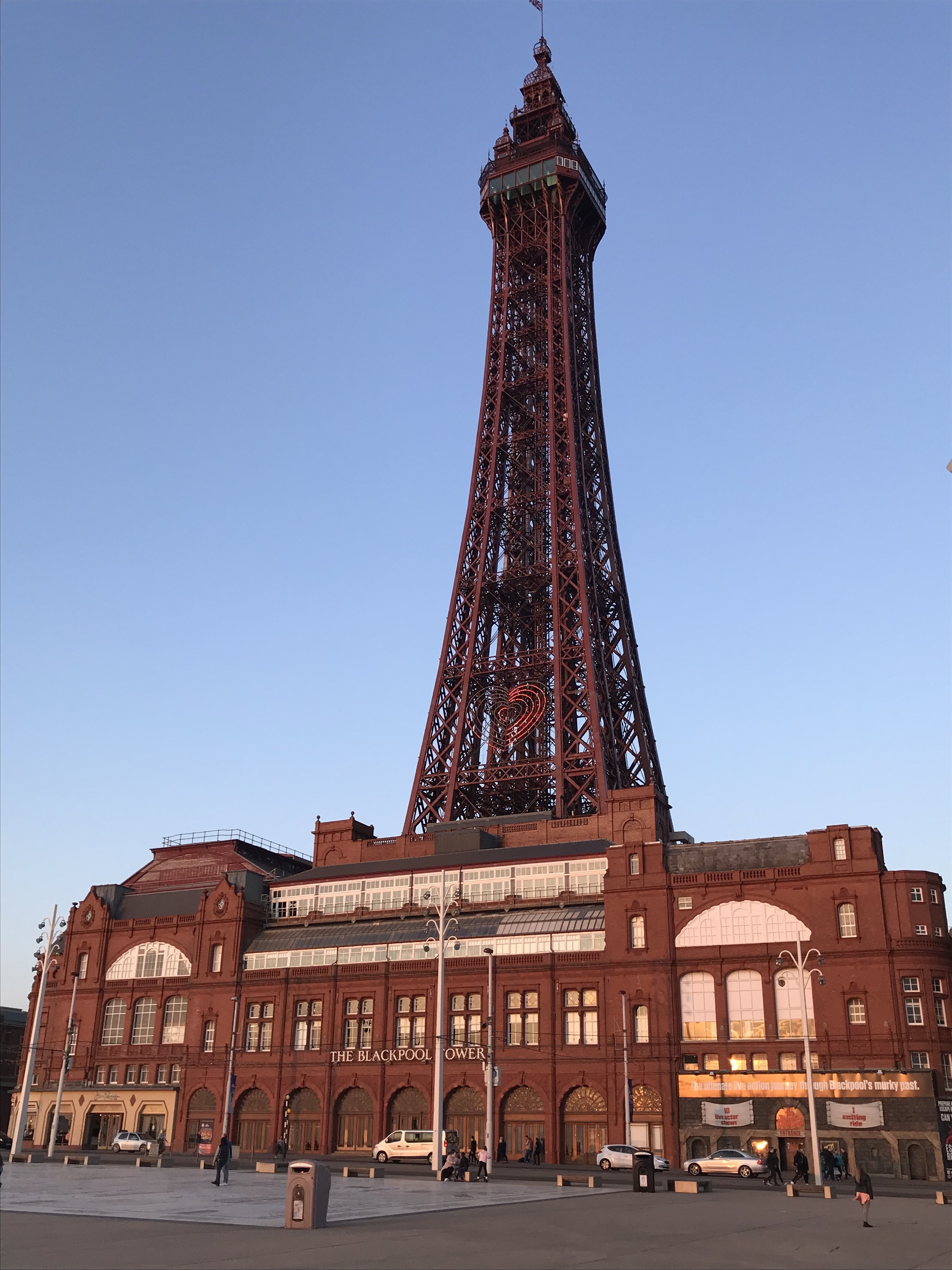
The Tower Circus at the Blackpool Tower holds the event from 2011 to 2015 and from 2025 onwards

A similar event known as Shoot-Out was first held in September 1990, when, except in the final, all matches were decided over a single frame. With the demise of Pot Black, the event returned in 2011 as an invitational event, with several innovations and was renamed to Snooker Shoot Out; It was a one-frame shoot-out with a random draw, where the winner is given £32,000. The top 64 players in the world rankings contested the tournament, which was shown on Sky Sports and ITV4. The 2011 event was the first time that Sky Sports had shown a World Snooker Tour event live since 2004. From 2011 to 2015 the event took place at the Circus Arena in Blackpool.

In 2017, the tournament became a ranking event for the first time, open to all 128 professional players. At the end of the season, the players voted to keep it as a ranking event. From 2017 the tournament was staged at the Colosseum in Watford. In 2018, the event agreed a long-term deal with Eurosport and Quest to broadcast the event in the United Kingdom until 2026, beginning with the 2019 Snooker Shoot Out.

In January 2023, Reanne Evans became the first female winner of a Snooker Shoot Out match as well as the first woman to win a televised match at a ranking event. In December 2023, Shaun Murphy made the first ever Shoot Out maximum break in his first-round match against Bulcsú Révész.

The event was sponsored by CaesarsCasino.com in 2011, by PartyPoker.com in 2012, by Betfair in 2013, by 888casino in 2014, and by Betway in 2015. The tournament was held at the Hexagon in Reading for 2016. From 2016 to 2018, the tournament was broadcast by ITV and was sponsored by Coral. It was briefly included as part of the European Series in the early 2020s and was sponsored by the series sponsor BetVictor, until the series ceased in 2023 and a new sponsor, 9club, replaced the former from the 2024 event.

The tournament returned to the Circus Arena in Blackpool for the 2025 edition, a decade after the tournament left for other places in England and Wales.

== Format ==
Rules by the WPBSA:

- Every frame lasts a maximum of 10 minutes.
- There is a shot clock. For the first 5 minutes of the match, players have 15 seconds per shot, but for the last 5 minutes this is reduced to 10 seconds. Prior to 2013, the shot clock was set at 20 seconds per shot for the first 5 minutes and 15 seconds for the last 5 minutes. Failure to strike the cue ball within the time allowed results in a minimum 5 points penalty or the value of the "ball-on", whichever is greater. Prior to 2018, it was always a 5 points penalty. In 2021, normal rules regarding foul points were used.
- Players must hit a cushion (with any ball) or pot a ball with every shot. Prior to 2013 either the cue ball or the object ball needed to hit a cushion. Failure to do so results in a minimum 5 points penalty or the value of the "ball-on", whichever is greater. Prior to 2018, it was always a 5 points penalty.
- All fouls result in ball-in-hand.
- Players "lag" for who breaks off.
- In an event of a tie the blue ball shoot-out determines the winner. The blue ball is placed on its spot and the cue ball can be placed anywhere within the "D". The winner of the lag decides who goes first. The players make alternate attempts until one player has potted the blue more times than his or her opponent after taking the same number of shots. The blue must be potted directly, without touching a cushion other than the jaws of the intended pocket. This prevents a player from winning with a fluke.

== Winners ==
Year	Winner	Runner-up	Final score	Venue	City	Season
Shoot-Out (non-ranking, 1990)
1990	Darren Morgan (WAL)	Mike Hallett (ENG)	2–1 (Note: The final was best of three frames.)	Trentham Gardens	Stoke-on-Trent, England	1990/91
Snooker Shoot-Out (non-ranking, 2011–2016)
2011	Nigel Bond (ENG)	Robert Milkins (ENG)	1–0 (62–23)	Tower Circus	Blackpool, England	2010/11
2012	Barry Hawkins (ENG)	Graeme Dott (SCO)	1–0 (61–23)	Tower Circus	Blackpool, England	2011/12
2013	Martin Gould (ENG)	Mark Allen (NIR)	1–0 (104–0)	Tower Circus	Blackpool, England	2012/13
2014	Dominic Dale (WAL)	Stuart Bingham (ENG)	1–0 (77–19)	Tower Circus	Blackpool, England	2013/14
2015	Michael White (WAL)	Xiao Guodong (CHN)	1–0 (54–48)	Tower Circus	Blackpool, England	2014/15
2016	Robin Hull (FIN)	Luca Brecel (BEL)	1–0 (50–36)	Hexagon Theatre	Reading, England	2015/16
Snooker Shoot Out (ranking, 2017–present)
2017	Anthony McGill (SCO)	Xiao Guodong (CHN)	1–0 (67–19)	Watford Colosseum	Watford, England	2016/17
2018	Michael Georgiou (CYP)	Graeme Dott (SCO)	1–0 (67–56)	Watford Colosseum	Watford, England	2017/18
2019	Thepchaiya Un-Nooh (THA)	Michael Holt (ENG)	1–0 (74–0)	Watford Colosseum	Watford, England	2018/19
2020	Michael Holt (ENG)	Zhou Yuelong (CHN)	1–0 (64–1)	Watford Colosseum	Watford, England	2019/20
2021	Ryan Day (WAL)	Mark Selby (ENG)	1–0 (67–24)	Marshall Arena	Milton Keynes, England	2020/21
2022	Hossein Vafaei (IRN)	Mark Williams (WAL)	1–0 (71–0)	Leicester Arena	Leicester, England	2021/22
2023 (Jan)	Chris Wakelin (ENG)	Julien Leclercq (BEL)	1–0 (119–0)	Leicester Arena	Leicester, England	2022/23
2023 (Dec)	Mark Allen (NIR)	Cao Yupeng (CHN)	1–0 (65–4)	Swansea Arena	Swansea, Wales	2023/24
2024	Tom Ford (ENG)	Liam Graham (SCO)	1–0 (31–28)	Leicester Arena	Leicester, England	2024/25
2025	Alfie Burden (ENG)	Stuart Bingham (ENG)	1–0 (63–8)	Tower Circus	Blackpool, England	2025/26
2026				Tower Circus	Blackpool, England	2026/27

== Century breaks ==
Total: 35

- 147 – Shaun Murphy (2023)
- 142 – Mark Allen (2021)
- 141 – Wu Yize (2025)
- 139 – Thepchaiya Un-Nooh (2019)
- 135, 116, 100 – Martin Gould (2012, 2015, 2019)
- 133 – Luca Brecel (2019)
- 133 – Thor Chuan Leong (2020)
- 132 – Ricky Walden (2019)
- 129, 113 – Ronnie O'Sullivan (2011)
- 127, 106 – David Gilbert (2016, 2025)
- 126 – Yuan Sijun (2025)
- 125 – Mark Selby (2013)
- 123 – Hossein Vafaei (2022)
- 121 – Stephen Lee (2012)
- 120 – Tony Knowles (1990)
- 120 – Chang Bingyu (2020)
- 119 – Chris Wakelin (2023)
- 117 – Ali Carter (2023)
- 116 – Michael Holt (2023)
- 112 – Mark King (2011)
- 109 – Michael Georgiou (2018)
- 107 – Jak Jones (2020)
- 106, 101 – Xiao Guodong (2020, 2023)
- 106 – Alfie Burden (2011)
- 105 – Sanderson Lam (2025)
- 103 – Allan Taylor (2022)
- 102 – Mark Davis (2018)
- 101 – Ryan Day (2014)
- 101 – Kyren Wilson (2023)
- 101 – Zhou Yuelong (2024)

== Records ==
- Michael Holt has played (42) and won (30) the most matches in the tournament's history.
- Paul Davison has entered the tournament 7 times without winning a match.
- Robin Hull has the best winning record in terms of percentages, winning 87.5% of his matches (7 out of 8 played).
- When it comes to the winners trying to defend their title, as of the 2023 tournament, 5 of the winners have lost in the 1st round the year after winning the trophy; the best performance by a defending champion was by Barry Hawkins, who reached the quarter-final stage.
- Barry Pinches, Nigel Bond, Rod Lawler, and Ken Doherty all competed in the original event back in 1990, and also took part in the 2022 tournament.
- The highest break in Shoot Out history is 147 by Shaun Murphy in December 2023.
- The lowest aggregate score is 8, recorded when Elliot Slessor beat Mostafa Dorgham 7-1 in 2024; this match also holds the record for the lowest winning score of 7.
- Only one century break has been recorded in a final, by Chris Wakelin in 2023.
- As of 2024, no player has won a frame when requiring 'snookers'.
