= 2011 Australian Goldfields Open =

Australian Goldfields Open

Tournament information
- Dates: 18–24 July 2011
- Venue: Bendigo Stadium
- City: Bendigo
- Country: Australia
- Organisation: World Snooker
- Format: Ranking event
- Total prize fund: $425,000
- Winner's share: $60,000
- Highest break: Mark Williams (WAL) (142)

Final
- Champion: Stuart Bingham (ENG)
- Runner-up: Mark Williams (WAL)
- Score: 9–8

The 2011 Australian Goldfields Open was a professional ranking snooker tournament that took place between 18 and 24 July 2011 at the Bendigo Stadium in Bendigo, Australia.

The event was last held in 1995 under the name Australian Masters, where Anthony Hamilton defeated Chris Small 8–6 in the final. However, Hamilton withdrew from the tournament in the qualifying rounds citing personal reasons and therefore did not compete to defend his title.

Stuart Bingham won the first ranking title of his career by defeating Mark Williams 9–8 in the final.

== Prize fund ==
The breakdown of prize money for this year is shown below:^{[a]}

- Winner: $60,000
- Runner-up: $30,000
- Semi-final: $20,000
- Quarter-final: $15,000
- Last 16: $10,000
- Last 32: $7,500
- Last 48: $2,000
- Stage one highest break: $500
- Stage two highest break: $2,500
- Total: $425,000

== Main draw ==
Last 32; Best of 9 frames
1	(Scotland) John Higgins	4
(England) Matthew Selt^{[b1]}	5
16	(Scotland) Stephen Hendry	5
(England) Martin Gould	3
13	(England) Peter Ebdon	3
(England) Rory McLeod	5
7	(England) Shaun Murphy	5
(England) Andrew Higginson	3
6	(England) Ali Carter	3
(Scotland) Marcus Campbell	5
12	(Northern Ireland) Mark Allen	5
(Wales) Ryan Day	3
15	(England) Jamie Cope	3
(England) Tom Ford	5
4	(China) Ding Junhui	2
(England) Stuart Bingham	5
3	(England) Mark Selby	5
(England) Joe Perry	3
9	(England) Judd Trump	3
(England) Mark Davis	5
14	(Wales) Matthew Stevens	4
(China) Liang Wenbo	5
8	(Scotland) Stephen Maguire	2
(Republic of Ireland) Ken Doherty	5
5	(Australia) Neil Robertson	5
(England) Nigel Bond	2
(Wales) Dominic Dale	5
(Australia) Steve Mifsud^{[b2]}	2
(England) David Gilbert^{[c]}	5
(Australia) James Mifsud	1
2	(Wales) Mark Williams	5
(England) Barry Pinches	2

Last 16; Best of 9 frames
(England) Matthew Selt	5
16	(Scotland) Stephen Hendry	1
(England) Rory McLeod	1
7	(England) Shaun Murphy	5
(Scotland) Marcus Campbell	1
12	(Northern Ireland) Mark Allen	5
(England) Tom Ford	0
(England) Stuart Bingham	5
3	(England) Mark Selby	5
(England) Mark Davis	3
(China) Liang Wenbo	4
(Republic of Ireland) Ken Doherty	5
5	(Australia) Neil Robertson	4
(Wales) Dominic Dale	5
(England) David Gilbert	2
2	(Wales) Mark Williams	5

Quarter-finals; Best of 9 frames
(England) Matthew Selt	3
7	(England) Shaun Murphy	5
12	(Northern Ireland) Mark Allen	3
(England) Stuart Bingham	5
3	(England) Mark Selby	3
(Republic of Ireland) Ken Doherty	5
(Wales) Dominic Dale	4
2	(Wales) Mark Williams	5

Semi-finals; Best of 11 frames
7	(England) Shaun Murphy	2
(England) Stuart Bingham	6
(Republic of Ireland) Ken Doherty	2
2	(Wales) Mark Williams	6

Final; Best of 17 frames
(England) Stuart Bingham	9
2	(Wales) Mark Williams	8

== Final ==
Final: Best of 17 frames. Referee: Michaela Tabb; Bendigo Stadium, Bendigo, Australia
Stuart Bingham; England	9–8	Mark Williams (2); Wales
Afternoon: 139–0 (139), 0–89 (89), 71–39, 55–42, 9–98 (85), 40–66 (57), 19–84 (84), 64–52 (Williams 52); Evening: 7–69 (52), 13–78, 4–71 (71), 51–10, 10–81 (68), 67–32, 70–8 (69), 76–0 (76), 80–34
139	Highest break	89
1	Century breaks	0
3	50+ breaks	8

== Qualifying ==
These matches took place between 26 and 30 June 2011 at the World Snooker Academy in Sheffield, England. David Gilbert was the only player to go through all four rounds of qualifying to make it to the main stage.

Preliminary round

Best of 9 frames

(India) Lucky Vatnani	w/d–w/o	(Norway) Kurt Maflin

Round 1–4

Round 1 Best of 9 frames
(England) Sam Baird	5
(Belgium) Luca Brecel	1
(Wales) Andrew Pagett	5
(England) Adam Wicheard	4
(England) Paul Davison	5
(Republic of Ireland) David Hogan	3
(Belgium) Bjorn Haneveer	3
(England) Andrew Norman	5
(Northern Ireland) Joe Meara	3
(Republic of Ireland) David Morris	5
(Wales) Michael White	4
(China) Yu Delu	5
(Thailand) Dechawat Poomjaeng	1
(Finland) Robin Hull	5
(China) Cao Yupeng	1
(Norway) Kurt Maflin	5
(England) Sam Craigie	5
(England) David Grace	1
(India) Aditya Mehta	1
(China) Tian Pengfei	5
(England) Ben Woollaston	5
(England) Adam Duffy	2
(Scotland) Scott MacKenzie	5
(England) Stuart Carrington	4
(Poland) Kacper Filipiak	0
(China) Li Yan	5
(England) Liam Highfield	5
(England) Simon Bedford	4
(Thailand) Passakorn Suwannawat	4
(England) David Gilbert	5
(Wales) Daniel Wells	2
(Thailand) James Wattana	5

Round 2 Best of 9 frames
(England) Adrian Gunnell	5
(England) Sam Baird	4
(England) Jimmy Robertson	5
(Wales) Andrew Pagett	2
(England) Jimmy White	5
(England) Paul Davison	2
(China) Liu Chuang	3
(England) Andrew Norman	5
(England) Rod Lawler	5
(Republic of Ireland) David Morris	3
(Northern Ireland) Joe Swail	1
(China) Yu Delu	5
(England) Jack Lisowski	5
(Finland) Robin Hull	2
(England) Peter Lines	3
(Norway) Kurt Maflin	5
(China) Liu Song	3
(England) Sam Craigie	5
(Scotland) Anthony McGill	1
(China) Tian Pengfei	5
(England) Ian McCulloch	3
(England) Ben Woollaston	5
(England) Andy Hicks	1
(Scotland) Scott MacKenzie	5
(Scotland) Alan McManus	1
(China) Li Yan	5
(China) Xiao Guodong	4
(England) Liam Highfield	5
(England) Alfie Burden	2
(England) David Gilbert	5
(England) Matthew Couch	5
(Thailand) James Wattana	4

Round 3 Best of 9 frames
(England) Matthew Selt	5
(England) Adrian Gunnell	1
(England) Mark Joyce	5
(England) Jimmy Robertson	3
(England) Rory McLeod	5
(England) Jimmy White	3
(Scotland) Jamie Burnett	5
(England) Andrew Norman	3
(England) Mike Dunn	5
(England) Rod Lawler	3
(England) Joe Jogia	2
(China) Yu Delu	5
(England) Tom Ford	5
(England) Jack Lisowski	3
(England) Michael Holt	5
(Norway) Kurt Maflin	1
(Republic of Ireland) Fergal O'Brien	5
(England) Sam Craigie	1
(England) Anthony Hamilton	w/d
(China) Tian Pengfei	w/o
(Wales) Jamie Jones	4
(England) Ben Woollaston	5
(Malta) Tony Drago	1
(Scotland) Scott MacKenzie	5
(England) Nigel Bond	5
(China) Li Yan	3
(England) Steve Davis	w/d
(England) Liam Highfield	w/o
(England) Dave Harold	4
(England) David Gilbert	5
(England) Barry Pinches	5
(England) Matthew Couch	3

Round 4 Best of 9 frames
(England) Ricky Walden	0
(England) Matthew Selt	5
(England) Martin Gould	5
(England) Mark Joyce	3
(England) Robert Milkins	2
(England) Rory McLeod	5
(England) Andrew Higginson	5
(Scotland) Jamie Burnett	4
(Scotland) Marcus Campbell	5
(England) Mike Dunn	4
(Wales) Ryan Day	5
(China) Yu Delu	0
(Northern Ireland) Gerard Greene	2
(England) Tom Ford	5
(England) Stuart Bingham	5
(England) Michael Holt	2
(England) Joe Perry	5
(Republic of Ireland) Fergal O'Brien	2
(England) Mark Davis	5
(China) Tian Pengfei	4
(China) Liang Wenbo	5
(England) Ben Woollaston	3
(Republic of Ireland) Ken Doherty	5
(Scotland) Scott MacKenzie	2
(England) Barry Hawkins	4
(England) Nigel Bond	5
(Wales) Dominic Dale	5
(England) Liam Highfield	3
(England) Mark King	0
(England) David Gilbert	5
(England) Stephen Lee	3
(England) Barry Pinches	5

== Century breaks ==
=== Qualifying stage centuries ===
- 141, 101 – Ian McCulloch
- 137, 111 – Barry Hawkins
- 137 – Liu Chuang
- 136, 111, 100 – Robin Hull
- 136 – Mark Davis
- 134 – Dominic Dale
- 126 – Mark Joyce
- 125 – Barry Pinches
- 123 – Ben Woollaston
- 122, 113 – David Gilbert
- 122 – Adrian Gunnell
- 118 – Aditya Mehta
- 117 – Jack Lisowski
- 115 – Liam Highfield
- 115 – Michael Holt
- 114, 100 – Matthew Selt
- 114 – Passakorn Suwannawat
- 114 – Stuart Bingham
- 113, 110, 107, 104 – Tian Pengfei
- 112 – Kurt Maflin
- 110 – Ben Woollaston
- 104 – Jamie Burnett
- 103 – Michael White
- 100 – Liang Wenbo

=== Televised stage centuries ===
- 142, 140, 118, 110, 106 – Mark Williams
- 139, 118, 114, 112, 107 – Stuart Bingham
- 137 – Matthew Selt
- 134 – Ali Carter
- 124, 104 – Ding Junhui
- 123 – Dominic Dale
- 120, 111 – Liang Wenbo
- 120 – Stephen Hendry
- 111, 101 – Neil Robertson
- 102 – Jamie Cope
- 101, 100 – Mark Allen
- 100 – Rory McLeod

== Notes ==
- ^{a} All prize money were subject to 46% local tax.
- ^{b1} ^{b2} Originally Matthew Selt was set to play Steve Mifsud in the wildcard round, but after the withdrawal of Ronnie O'Sullivan for medical reasons Selt advanced to the last 32 to play John Higgins and Mifsud played against Dominic Dale.
- ^{c} Originally David Gilbert was set to play James Mifsud in the wildcard round, but after the withdrawal of Graeme Dott, their match was moved in the last 32 stage of the draw.
