= Terry Murphy (snooker player) =

Northern Irish snooker player

Personal information
- Born: 6 March 1972 (age 54) Derry, Northern Ireland

Sport
- Country: Northern Ireland
- Sport: Snooker
- Professional: 1991–2005
- Highest ranking: 29 (1998/1999)
- Best ranking finish: Quarter-final (x1)

Terry Murphy (born 6 March 1972) is a Northern Irish former professional snooker player.

== Career ==
Murphy started playing the game on a reduced-size table his parents bought him in order to keep him off the streets of his native Derry while growing up, before he moved to The Midlands when he was a teenager. Murphy turned professional in 1991, and represented Northern Ireland at the World Cup in 1996, and also had his highest-ranking finish of a quarter-final in the 1997 Welsh Open. He reached a career high ranking of 29th in Snooker world rankings 1997/1998 and 1998/1999. He appeared in the 1998 World Championship where he lost 3–10 to Peter Ebdon. The following year he again reached the World Championship but was defeated 8–10 by John Parrott. He lost his full professional status in 2004, finishing 113th in the rankings at a time when only the top 64 automatically retained their place on the main tour.

== Performance and rankings timeline ==
Tournament	1991/ 92	1992/ 93	1993/ 94	1994/ 95	1995/ 96	1996/ 97	1997/ 98	1998/ 99	1999/ 00	2000/ 01	2001/ 02	2002/ 03	2003/ 04	2004/ 05
Ranking	(Note: New players on the Main Tour do not have a ranking.)	133	138	91	61	41	29	29	30	30	35	45	65	(Note: He was not on the Main Tour.)
Ranking tournaments
Grand Prix (Note: The event ran under different names such as LG Cup (2001/2002 to 2003/2004).)	LQ	LQ	1R	1R	LQ	LQ	2R	1R	2R	3R	LQ	LQ	LQ	A
British Open	1R	LQ	LQ	1R	1R	1R	1R	2R	2R	2R	LQ	LQ	LQ	A
UK Championship	LQ	LQ	2R	LQ	LQ	3R	2R	3R	2R	1R	2R	LQ	LQ	A
Welsh Open	LQ	LQ	LQ	1R	3R	QF	2R	1R	1R	LQ	LQ	LQ	LQ	A
Malta Cup (Note: The event ran under different names such as European Open (1991/1992 to 1996/1997 and 2001/2002 to 2003/2004) and Irish Open (1998/1999).)	LQ	LQ	1R	LQ	LQ	LQ	NH	WD	Not Held		LQ	LQ	LQ	A
Irish Masters	Non-Ranking Event											LQ	WD	A
China Open (Note: The event ran under different names as China International (1997/1998 and 1998/1999))	Tournament Not Held						NR	LQ	1R	LQ	LQ	Not Held		A
World Championship	LQ	LQ	LQ	LQ	LQ	LQ	1R	1R	LQ	LQ	LQ	LQ	LQ	LQ
Non-ranking tournaments
The Masters	LQ	A	LQ	LQ	LQ	LQ	LQ	LQ	LQ	LQ	LQ	LQ	LQ	A
Former ranking tournaments
Classic	LQ	Tournament Not Held												
Strachan Open	LQ	Tournament Not Held												
Dubai Classic (Note: The event run under different names such as Thailand Classic (1995/1996) and Asian Classic (1996/1997))	LQ	LQ	2R	LQ	LQ	LQ	Tournament Not Held							
German Masters (Note: The event ran under different name as German Open (1995/1996 to 1997/1998).)	Tournament Not Held				LQ	LQ	LQ	NR	Tournament Not Held					
Malta Grand Prix	Not Held			Non-Ranking Event					LQ	NR	Tournament Not Held			
Thailand Masters (Note: The event ran under different names such as Asian Open (1991/1992 to 1992/1993) and Thailand Open (1993/1994 to 1996/1997).)	LQ	LQ	LQ	LQ	1R	LQ	LQ	WD	1R	LQ	LQ	NR	Not Held	
Scottish Open (Note: The event ran under different names such as International Open (1991/1992 to 1996/1997) and Players Championship (2003/2004).)	NH	LQ	LQ	1R	1R	1R	2R	1R	1R	1R	LQ	LQ	LQ	NH
Former non-ranking tournaments
Irish Professional Championship	LQ	A	Tournament Not Held											

Performance table legend
LQ	lost in the qualifying draw	#R	lost in the early rounds of the tournament (WR = Wildcard round, RR = Round robin)	QF	lost in the quarter-finals
SF	lost in the semi–finals	F	lost in the final	W	won the tournament
DNQ	did not qualify for the tournament	A	did not participate in the tournament	WD	withdrew from the tournament

NH / Not Held	means an event was not held.
NR / Non-Ranking Event	means an event is/was no longer a ranking event.
R / Ranking Event	means an event is/was a ranking event.
MR / Minor-Ranking Event	means an event is/was a minor-ranking event.
