= Australian Goldfields Open =

Snooker tournament

Tournament information
- Venue: Bendigo Stadium
- Location: Bendigo
- Country: Australia
- Established: 1979
- Organisation(s): World Professional Billiards and Snooker Association
- Format: Ranking event
- Total prize fund: $500,000
- Final year: 2015
- Final champion: (Scotland) John Higgins

The Australian Goldfields Open was a professional ranking snooker tournament. The final champion was John Higgins in 2015.

== History ==
Australia had previously hosted the 1971 and 1975 World Snooker Championships, as well as several other high-profile snooker tournaments and in 1979 the Australian Masters was established.

The Australian Masters was initially sponsored by tobacco company Rothmans under their Winfield brand name. Until 1983, matches were of a single frame, like the BBC TV show Pot Black, with the final decided on the aggregate score over three frames. From 1983 the format changed to longer matches. It was mainly filmed in the Channel 10 TV studios in Sydney, although in 1984 the first round was held at the Parmatta Club, and the second round onwards was held in the studio. The 1987 edition was played between 29 June and 8 July 1987 at the North Sydney Anzac Memorial Club in Sydney.

There was an attempt to turn the event into a ranking tournament in 1989 but the sponsorship fell through so it was staged in Hong Kong instead, as the Hong Kong Open, which incidentally became the first ranking tournament to be staged in Asia. The Hong Kong event was discontinued after just one year, but returned to Australia in 1994 as the Australian Open. The tournament reverted to being called the Australian Masters for the following season, but was dropped from the calendar after the 1995 event. In addition, the tournament was also held in 1995 as the Australian Open immediately following the Australian Masters, featuring mostly the same players and the same two players in the final. In 2011 the World Professional Billiards and Snooker Association resurrected the event under the Australian Goldfields Open name and added it to the 2011/2012 calendar. The tournament's later incarnation providing the first ranking tournament victories for future World Champion Stuart Bingham and future world finalist Barry Hawkins and arguably resurrected the careers of these two players who had previously been considered journeyman professionals, who had previously hovered between the fringes of the top 16 and top 32.

In 2016, the event was quietly dropped from the calendar.

== Winners ==
| Year | Winner | Runner-up | Final score | City | Season |
Australian Masters (non-ranking)
| 1979 | (Australia) Ian Anderson | (South Africa) Perrie Mans | Aggregate Score (Note: The finals were decided on aggregate score over three frames between 1979 and 1982 and five frames in 1987.) | (Australia) Sydney | 1979/80 |
| 1980 | (England) John Spencer | (Northern Ireland) Dennis Taylor | Aggregate Score | (Australia) Sydney | 1980/81 |
| 1981 | (England) Tony Meo | (England) John Spencer | Aggregate Score | (Australia) Sydney | 1981/82 |
| 1982 | (England) Steve Davis | (Australia) Eddie Charlton | 254–100 points | (Australia) Sydney | 1982/83 |
| 1983 | (Canada) Cliff Thorburn | (Canada) Bill Werbeniuk | 7–3 | (Australia) Sydney | 1983/84 |
| 1984 | (England) Tony Knowles | (England) John Virgo | 7–3 | (Australia) Sydney | 1984/85 |
| 1985 | (England) Tony Meo | (Australia) John Campbell | 7–2 | (Australia) Sydney | 1985/86 |
| 1986 | (Northern Ireland) Dennis Taylor | (England) Steve Davis | 3–2 | (Australia) Sydney | 1986/87 |
| 1987 | (Scotland) Stephen Hendry | (England) Mike Hallett | 371–226 points | (Australia) Sydney | 1987/88 |
Hong Kong Open (ranking)
| 1989 | (England) Mike Hallett | (New Zealand) Dene O'Kane | 9–8 | Hong Kong | 1989/90 |
Australian Open (non-ranking)
| 1994 | (Scotland) John Higgins | (England) Willie Thorne | 9–5 | (Australia) Melbourne | 1994/95 |
Australian Masters (non-ranking)
| 1995 | (England) Anthony Hamilton | (Scotland) Chris Small | 8–6 | (Australia) Melbourne | 1995/96 |
Australian Open (non-ranking)
| 1995 | (England) Anthony Hamilton | (Scotland) Chris Small | 9–7 | (Australia) Melbourne | 1995/96 |
Australian Goldfields Open (ranking)
| 2011 | (England) Stuart Bingham | (Wales) Mark Williams | 9–8 | (Australia) Bendigo | 2011/12 |
| 2012 | (England) Barry Hawkins | (England) Peter Ebdon | 9–3 | (Australia) Bendigo | 2012/13 |
| 2013 | (Hong Kong) Marco Fu | (Australia) Neil Robertson | 9–6 | (Australia) Bendigo | 2013/14 |
| 2014 | (England) Judd Trump | (Australia) Neil Robertson | 9–5 | (Australia) Bendigo | 2014/15 |
| 2015 | (Scotland) John Higgins | (England) Martin Gould | 9–8 | (Australia) Bendigo | 2015/16 |
