= 1999 Scottish Open (snooker) =

1999 Regal Scottish Open
Tournament information
- Dates: 15–21 February 1999
- Venue: AECC
- City: Aberdeen
- Country: Scotland
- Organisation: WPBSA
- Format: Ranking event
- Total prize fund: £370,000
- Winner's share: £60,000
- Highest break: Rod Lawler (ENG) (142)

Final
- Champion: Stephen Hendry (SCO)
- Runner-up: Graeme Dott (SCO)
- Score: 9–1

The 1999 Scottish Open (officially the 1999 Regal Scottish Open) was a professional ranking snooker tournament, that was held in February 1999 at the AECC, Aberdeen, Scotland.

Stephen Hendry won the tournament by defeating Graeme Dott nine frames to one in the final. The defending champion, Ronnie O'Sullivan, was defeated in the last 32 by Paul Hunter.

== Main draw ==
Last 64; Best of 9 frames
(England) Ronnie O'Sullivan	w/o
(England) Jonathan Birch	w/d
(England) Paul Hunter	5
(Scotland) John Lardner	3
(England) Anthony Hamilton	5
(England) Steve James	3
(Scotland) Jamie Burnett	5
(England) David Roe	2
(England) Mark King	2
(Australia) Quinten Hann	5
(Scotland) Graeme Dott	5
(England) Jimmy Michie	4
(England) John Parrott	5
(England) Dave Finbow	3
(England) Martin Clark	4
(Republic of Ireland) Leo Fernandez	5
(Wales) Mark Williams	5
(England) Peter Lines	4
(Wales) Dominic Dale	5
(England) Joe Johnson	3
(Thailand) James Wattana	2
(England) Karl Broughton	5
(Wales) Matthew Stevens	5
(England) Stefan Mazrocis	2
(Malta) Tony Drago	5
(England) Matt Wilson	0
(Republic of Ireland) Fergal O'Brien	5
(England) Alfie Burden	2
(Republic of Ireland) Ken Doherty	5
(Northern Ireland) Joe Swail	2
(England) Gary Wilkinson	1
(Scotland) Marcus Campbell	5
(Scotland) Stephen Hendry	5
(England) Lee Richardson	0
(Wales) Darren Morgan	4
(England) Nick Pearce	5
(Canada) Alain Robidoux	2
(Scotland) Drew Henry	5
(England) Brian Morgan	5
(England) Rod Lawler	3
(England) Steve Davis	1
(England) Darren Clarke	5
(Scotland) Chris Small	5
(England) Barry Mapstone	1
(Scotland) Alan McManus	5
(Scotland) David McLellan	2
(England) Andy Hicks	0
(England) Willie Thorne	5
(England) Peter Ebdon	5
(England) Ian McCulloch	4
(England) Jimmy White	5
(Wales) Lee Walker	2
(England) Stephen Lee	5
(England) Nick Walker	1
(Northern Ireland) Terry Murphy	3
(Wales) Paul Davies	5
(England) Nigel Bond	5
(Scotland) Euan Henderson	1
(England) Dave Harold	w/o
(England) Karl Payne	w/d
(Scotland) John Higgins	5
(England) Leigh Griffin	3
(Scotland) Billy Snaddon	2
(England) Stuart Pettman	5

Last 32; Best of 9 frames
(England) Ronnie O'Sullivan	3
(England) Paul Hunter	5
(England) Anthony Hamilton	4
(Scotland) Jamie Burnett	5
(Australia) Quinten Hann	2
(Scotland) Graeme Dott	5
(England) John Parrott	5
(Republic of Ireland) Leo Fernandez	2
(Wales) Mark Williams	5
(Wales) Dominic Dale	1
(England) Karl Broughton	4
(Wales) Matthew Stevens	5
(Malta) Tony Drago	4
(Republic of Ireland) Fergal O'Brien	5
(Republic of Ireland) Ken Doherty	5
(Scotland) Marcus Campbell	1
(Scotland) Stephen Hendry	5
(England) Nick Pearce	2
(Scotland) Drew Henry	3
(England) Brian Morgan	5
(England) Darren Clarke	1
(Scotland) Chris Small	5
(Scotland) Alan McManus	5
(England) Willie Thorne	3
(England) Peter Ebdon	5
(England) Jimmy White	3
(England) Stephen Lee	5
(Wales) Paul Davies	2
(England) Nigel Bond	1
(England) Dave Harold	5
(Scotland) John Higgins	5
(England) Stuart Pettman	0

Last 16; Best of 9 frames
(England) Paul Hunter	5
(Scotland) Jamie Burnett	4
(Scotland) Graeme Dott	5
(England) John Parrott	4
(Wales) Mark Williams	5
(Wales) Matthew Stevens	4
(Republic of Ireland) Fergal O'Brien	3
(Republic of Ireland) Ken Doherty	5
(Scotland) Stephen Hendry	5
(England) Brian Morgan	3
(Scotland) Chris Small	0
(Scotland) Alan McManus	5
(England) Peter Ebdon	0
(England) Stephen Lee	5
(England) Dave Harold	1
(Scotland) John Higgins	5

Quarter-finals; Best of 9 frames
(England) Paul Hunter	4
(Scotland) Graeme Dott	5
(Wales) Mark Williams	0
(Republic of Ireland) Ken Doherty	5
(Scotland) Stephen Hendry	5
(Scotland) Alan McManus	1
(England) Stephen Lee	4
(Scotland) John Higgins	5

Semi-finals; Best of 11 frames
(Scotland) Graeme Dott	6
(Republic of Ireland) Ken Doherty	5
(Scotland) Stephen Hendry	6
(Scotland) John Higgins	5

Final; Best of 17 frames
(Scotland) Graeme Dott	1
(Scotland) Stephen Hendry	9

== Final ==
Final: Best of 17 frames. AECC, Aberdeen, Scotland. 21 February 1999.
Stephen Hendry; Scotland	9–1	Graeme Dott; Scotland
Afternoon: 68–32, 79–0, 75–44 (74), 61–35 (60), 50–35, 69–49, 70–60 (Hendry 70, Dott 60), 73–4 (71); Evening: 0–68, 90–20
74	Highest break	60
0	Century breaks	0
4	50+ breaks	1
