= 1999 British Open (1999/2000) =

Snooker tournament held in September 1999

Tournament information
- Dates: 8–19 September 1999
- Venue: Plymouth Pavilions
- City: Plymouth
- Country: England
- Organisation: WPBSA
- Format: Ranking event
- Total prize fund: £400,000
- Winner's share: £62,000
- Highest break: Stephen Hendry (SCO) (147)

Final
- Champion: Stephen Hendry (SCO)
- Runner-up: Peter Ebdon (ENG)
- Score: 9–5

The 1999 British Open was a professional ranking snooker tournament, that was held from 8–19 September 1999 at the Plymouth Pavilions, Plymouth, England.

Stephen Hendry won the tournament by defeating Peter Ebdon nine frames to five in the final, during which Hendry made a maximum break in the seventh frame. The defending champion, Fergal O'Brien, was defeated by Joe Swail in the last 16.

== Main draw ==
Last 64; Best of 9 frames
(Republic of Ireland) Fergal O'Brien	5
(England) John Read	1
(England) Andy Hicks	5
(England) Adrian Gunnell	1
(England) Anthony Hamilton	4
(England) Darren Clarke	5
(Northern Ireland) Joe Swail	5
(Wales) James Reynolds	4
(Scotland) Alan McManus	5
(England) David Finbow	3
(Wales) Darren Morgan	5
(Wales) Lee Walker	3
(Republic of Ireland) Ken Doherty	5
(England) Alfie Burden	2
(England) Nigel Bond	2
(Scotland) Drew Henry	5
(England) John Parrott	5
(England) Nick Pearce	1
(Thailand) James Wattana	5
(Scotland) Hugh Abernethy	4
(England) Peter Ebdon	5
(Wales) Anthony Davies	4
(England) Brian Morgan	5
(England) Joe Johnson	4
(England) Steve Davis	5
(England) Dean Reynolds	1
(Scotland) Chris Small	5
(England) Stuart Bingham	3
(Wales) Mark Williams	5
(Republic of Ireland) Michael Judge	3
(England) Gary Wilkinson	5
(England) Mark Selby	2
(Scotland) John Higgins	5
(Scotland) Martin Dziewialtowski	0
(Wales) Dominic Dale	5
(England) Jason Ferguson	3
(England) Mark King	5
(England) Ian McCulloch	3
(England) Dave Harold	3
(England) Steve Judd	5
(England) Paul Hunter	5
(England) Jimmy Michie	2
(Scotland) Stephen Maguire	5
(Scotland) Billy Snaddon	3
(England) Ronnie O'Sullivan	5
(England) Leigh Griffin	0
(Scotland) Jamie Burnett	5
(England) Mick Price	2
(England) Stephen Lee	5
(England) Jonathan Birch	2
(Australia) Quinten Hann	5
(England) Stefan Mazrocis	4
(Wales) Matthew Stevens	1
(Republic of Ireland) Leo Fernandez	5
(Malta) Tony Drago	4
(England) Mark Davis	5
(England) Jimmy White	0
(England) Nick Walker	5
(Northern Ireland) Terry Murphy	5
(Wales) Mark Fenton	3
(Scotland) Stephen Hendry	5
(Hong Kong) Marco Fu	2
(Scotland) Graeme Dott	5
(England) Tony Jones	4

Last 32; Best of 9 frames
(Republic of Ireland) Fergal O'Brien	5
(England) Andy Hicks	2
(England) Darren Clarke	4
(Northern Ireland) Joe Swail	5
(Scotland) Alan McManus	5
(Wales) Darren Morgan	3
(Republic of Ireland) Ken Doherty	5
(Scotland) Drew Henry	3
(England) John Parrott	3
(Thailand) James Wattana	5
(England) Peter Ebdon	5
(England) Brian Morgan	2
(England) Steve Davis	5
(Scotland) Chris Small	2
(Wales) Mark Williams	5
(England) Gary Wilkinson	2
(Scotland) John Higgins	5
(Wales) Dominic Dale	2
(England) Mark King	5
(England) Steve Judd	1
(England) Paul Hunter	5
(Scotland) Stephen Maguire	0
(England) Ronnie O'Sullivan	5
(Scotland) Jamie Burnett	0
(England) Stephen Lee	5
(Australia) Quinten Hann	2
(Republic of Ireland) Leo Fernandez	4
(England) Mark Davis	5
(England) Nick Walker	5
(Northern Ireland) Terry Murphy	3
(Scotland) Stephen Hendry	5
(Scotland) Graeme Dott	4

Last 16; Best of 9 frames
(Republic of Ireland) Fergal O'Brien	1
(Northern Ireland) Joe Swail	5
(Scotland) Alan McManus	5
(Republic of Ireland) Ken Doherty	2
(Thailand) James Wattana	2
(England) Peter Ebdon	5
(England) Steve Davis	5
(Wales) Mark Williams	2
(Scotland) John Higgins	5
(England) Mark King	0
(England) Paul Hunter	4
(England) Ronnie O'Sullivan	5
(England) Stephen Lee	5
(England) Mark Davis	0
(England) Nick Walker	3
(Scotland) Stephen Hendry	5

Quarter-finals; Best of 9 frames
(Northern Ireland) Joe Swail	5
(Scotland) Alan McManus	4
(England) Peter Ebdon	5
(England) Steve Davis	2
(Scotland) John Higgins	1
(England) Ronnie O'Sullivan	5
(England) Stephen Lee	2
(Scotland) Stephen Hendry	5

Semi-finals; Best of 11 frames
(Northern Ireland) Joe Swail	3
(England) Peter Ebdon	6
(England) Ronnie O'Sullivan	5
(Scotland) Stephen Hendry	6

Final; Best of 17 frames
(England) Peter Ebdon	5
(Scotland) Stephen Hendry	9

== Final ==
Final: Best of 17 frames. Referee: John Newton; Plymouth Pavilions, Plymouth, England. 19 September 1999.
Stephen Hendry; Scotland	9–5	Peter Ebdon; England
Afternoon: 14–88 (82), 40–76, 12–77, 78–1 (78), 88–18 (88), 73–7, 147–0 (147), 32–79; Evening: 87–23 (87), 98–0 (98), 132–0 (132), 79–43 (78), 32–67 (62), 72–27
147	Highest break	82
2	Century breaks	0
7	50+ breaks	2
