= 1999 British Open (1998/1999) =

Snooker tournament held in April 1999

Tournament information
- Dates: 4–11 April 1999
- Venue: Plymouth Pavilions
- City: Plymouth
- Country: England
- Organisation: WPBSA
- Format: Ranking event
- Total prize fund: £370,000
- Winner's share: £60,000
- Highest break: Graeme Dott (SCO) (147)

Final
- Champion: Fergal O'Brien (IRL)
- Runner-up: Anthony Hamilton (ENG)
- Score: 9–7

The 1999 British Open was a professional ranking snooker tournament, that was held from 4–11 April 1999 at the Plymouth Pavilions, Plymouth, England.

Fergal O'Brien won the tournament by defeating Anthony Hamilton nine frames to seven in the final. The defending champion, John Higgins, was defeated by O'Brien in the semi-final.

Jason Prince recorded a maximum break during qualifying for the tournament against Ian Brumby. Graeme Dott made a maximum in his round of 64 match against David Roe.

== Main draw ==
Last 64; Best of 9 frames
(Scotland) John Higgins	5
(England) John Read	0
(Northern Ireland) Terry Murphy	5
(Belgium) Mario Geudens	0
(Thailand) James Wattana	4
(England) Michael Holt	5
(England) Andy Hicks	2
(England) David Finbow	5
(Canada) Alain Robidoux	2
(Wales) Anthony Davies	5
(England) Dave Harold	4
(England) Nick Walker	5
(Scotland) Alan McManus	5
(England) Alfie Burden	3
(England) Brian Morgan	5
(Wales) Philip Williams	2
(England) Peter Ebdon	5
(Australia) Quinten Hann	3
(Scotland) Jamie Burnett	3
(England) Mark Gray	5
(England) Stephen Lee	w/d
(Scotland) Drew Henry	w/o
(Scotland) Chris Small	5
(England) Joe Johnson	4
(England) Nigel Bond	3
(England) Bradley Jones	5
(Republic of Ireland) Fergal O'Brien	5
(England) Antony Bolsover	4
(Republic of Ireland) Ken Doherty	5
(England) Wayne Brown	1
(England) Gary Wilkinson	5
(England) Ian Brumby	4
(England) Ronnie O'Sullivan	5
(England) Tony Jones	2
(Wales) Matthew Stevens	1
(Wales) Paul Davies	5
(Malta) Tony Drago	3
(England) Jimmy Michie	5
(England) Martin Clark	2
(Scotland) Marcus Campbell	5
(England) Steve Davis	5
(England) Darren Clarke	2
(Wales) Dominic Dale	4
(Republic of Ireland) Michael Judge	5
(England) John Parrott	5
(Wales) Lee Walker	4
(England) Jimmy White	5
(Northern Ireland) Joe Swail	4
(Wales) Mark Williams	5
(England) Joe Perry	2
(Scotland) Billy Snaddon	3
(England) Craig Harrison	5
(England) Anthony Hamilton	5
(Hong Kong) Marco Fu	4
(England) Paul Hunter	5
(Wales) Ian Sargeant	3
(England) Mark King	5
(England) Barry Mapstone	2
(Wales) Darren Morgan	5
(England) Dean Reynolds	3
(Scotland) Stephen Hendry	5
(England) Jonathan Birch	0
(Scotland) Graeme Dott	5
(England) David Roe	4

Last 32; Best of 9 frames
(Scotland) John Higgins	5
(Northern Ireland) Terry Murphy	1
(England) Michael Holt	5
(England) David Finbow	2
(Wales) Anthony Davies	2
(England) Nick Walker	5
(Scotland) Alan McManus	3
(England) Brian Morgan	5
(England) Peter Ebdon	5
(England) Mark Gray	4
(Scotland) Drew Henry	3
(Scotland) Chris Small	5
(England) Bradley Jones	4
(Republic of Ireland) Fergal O'Brien	5
(Republic of Ireland) Ken Doherty	4
(England) Gary Wilkinson	5
(England) Ronnie O'Sullivan	5
(Wales) Paul Davies	0
(England) Jimmy Michie	5
(Scotland) Marcus Campbell	2
(England) Steve Davis	5
(Republic of Ireland) Michael Judge	3
(England) John Parrott	5
(England) Jimmy White	4
(Wales) Mark Williams	5
(England) Craig Harrison	2
(England) Anthony Hamilton	5
(England) Paul Hunter	4
(England) Mark King	5
(Wales) Darren Morgan	3
(Scotland) Stephen Hendry	5
(Scotland) Graeme Dott	2

Last 16; Best of 9 frames
(Scotland) John Higgins	5
(England) Michael Holt	1
(England) Nick Walker	4
(England) Brian Morgan	5
(England) Peter Ebdon	5
(Scotland) Chris Small	3
(Republic of Ireland) Fergal O'Brien	5
(England) Gary Wilkinson	2
(England) Ronnie O'Sullivan	3
(England) Jimmy Michie	5
(England) Steve Davis	4
(England) John Parrott	5
(Wales) Mark Williams	4
(England) Anthony Hamilton	5
(England) Mark King	4
(Scotland) Stephen Hendry	5

Quarter-finals; Best of 9 frames
(Scotland) John Higgins	5
(England) Brian Morgan	0
(England) Peter Ebdon	4
(Republic of Ireland) Fergal O'Brien	5
(England) Jimmy Michie	5
(England) John Parrott	4
(England) Anthony Hamilton	5
(Scotland) Stephen Hendry	4

Semi-finals; Best of 11 frames
(Scotland) John Higgins	5
(Republic of Ireland) Fergal O'Brien	6
(England) Jimmy Michie	1
(England) Anthony Hamilton	6

Final; Best of 17 frames
(Republic of Ireland) Fergal O'Brien	9
(England) Anthony Hamilton	7

== Final ==
Final: Best of 17 frames. Referee: Eirian Williams; Plymouth Pavilions, Plymouth, England. 11 April 1999.
Fergal O'Brien; Ireland	9–7	Anthony Hamilton; England
Afternoon: 0–134 (110), 0–134 (134), 55–40, 67–60 (51), 108–15 (59), 0–77 (61), 22–66 (64), 70–58; Evening: 95–0 (95), 65–41 (51), 0–80 (80), 4–86 (82), 0–143 (121), 77–42, 130–0 (129), 73–60
129	Highest break	134
1	Century breaks	3
5	50+ breaks	7
