= 2005 World Snooker Championship =

Professional snooker tournament

2005 Embassy World Snooker Championship
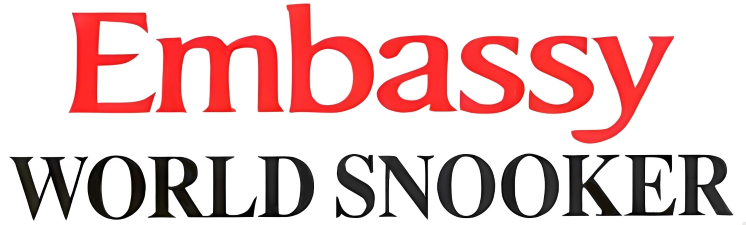

Tournament information
- Dates: 16 April – 2 May 2005
- Venue: Crucible Theatre
- City: Sheffield
- Country: England
- Organisation: WPBSA
- Format: Ranking event
- Total prize fund: £1,121,800
- Winner's share: £250,000
- Highest break: Mark Williams (WAL) (147)

Final
- Champion: Shaun Murphy (ENG)
- Runner-up: Matthew Stevens (WAL)
- Score: 18–16

The 2005 World Snooker Championship (also referred to as the 2005 Embassy World Snooker Championship for the purposes of sponsorship) was a professional snooker tournament that took place at the Crucible Theatre in Sheffield, England. The tournament started on 16 April, and ended on 2 May 2005. The event was the eighth and final world ranking event of the 2004–05 snooker season, following the 2005 China Open. The event was organised by the World Professional Billiards and Snooker Association. Due to laws banning advertising cigarettes in Great Britain, this was the last time the event was sponsored by the cigarette company Embassy. The event had a prize fund of £1,121,800, with the winner receiving £250,000.

Ronnie O'Sullivan was the defending champion, having defeated Graeme Dott in the 2004 World Snooker Championship final. O'Sullivan lost in the quarter-finals 11–13 against Peter Ebdon. Qualifier Shaun Murphy won his first ranking title by defeating Matthew Stevens 18–16 in the final. This was the first time that a qualifier won the championship since Terry Griffiths did so in 1979. Murphy aged 22 years and 265 days is the second youngest winner of the event after Stephen Hendry in 1990. There was a total of 63 century breaks made during the tournament, the highest being a maximum made by Mark Williams in the first round.

== Overview ==
The World Snooker Championship is an annual cue sport tournament and the official world championship of the game of snooker. Founded in the late 19th century by British Army soldiers stationed in India, the sport was popular in Great Britain. In modern times it has been played worldwide, especially in East and Southeast Asian nations such as China, Hong Kong and Thailand. The event was sponsored by the cigarette company Embassy. This was the last event to be sponsored by Embassy, after cigarette advertising was banned within the United Kingdom. The following season was sponsored by 888.com.

In the 2005 tournament, 32 professional players competed in one-on-one snooker matches played over several frames, using a single elimination format. The 32 players were selected for the event using the snooker world rankings and a pre-tournament qualification competition. In 1927, the first world championship was won by Joe Davis. The event's final took place in Camkin's Hall, Birmingham, England. Since 1977, the event has been held at the Crucible Theatre in Sheffield, England. Ronnie O'Sullivan had won the 2004 championship by defeating Scotland's Graeme Dott in the final 18–8. This was the second time O'Sullivan had won the world championship, the first being in 2001. The event was organised by the World Professional Billiards and Snooker Association. The event was broadcast in the United Kingdom on the BBC.

=== Format ===
The 2005 World Snooker Championship took place from 16 April to 2 May 2005 in Sheffield, England. The tournament was the last of eight ranking events in the 2004–05 snooker season on the World Snooker Tour. It featured a 32-player main draw that was held at the Crucible Theatre, as well as a 70-player qualifying draw that was played at the Pontin's, Prestatyn Sands, from 6 February to 24 March. This was the 29th consecutive year that the tournament had been staged at the Crucible. The draw for the championships was held after qualifying on 28 March.

The top 16 players in the latest world rankings automatically qualified for the main draw as seeded players. Ronnie O'Sullivan was seeded first overall as the defending champion, and the remaining 15 seeds were allocated based on the latest world rankings. The number of frames required to win a match increased throughout the tournament. The first round consisted of best-of-19-frames matches, with the final match being played over a maximum of 35 frames. All 16 non-seeded spots in the main draw were filled with players from the qualifying rounds. The draw for the qualifying competition consisted of 70 players from the World Snooker Tour. Players were seeded by their world ranking, with 16 players added in rounds 2–5. Players who won round five qualified for the main draw.

=== Prize fund ===
There was a total prize fund of £1,121,800, with the winner receiving £250,000. In making a maximum break, Mark Williams earned a bonus of £147,000. The breakdown of prize money for the event is shown below:

- Winner: £250,000
- Runner-up: £125,000
- Semi-finalists: £51,000
- Quarter-finalists: £26,000
- Last 16: £15,850
- Last 32: £12,000
- Last 48: £8,000
- Last 64: £5,000
- Televised stage highest break: £14,000
- Televised stage maximum break: £147,000
- Total: £1,121,800

== Summary ==
=== First round ===
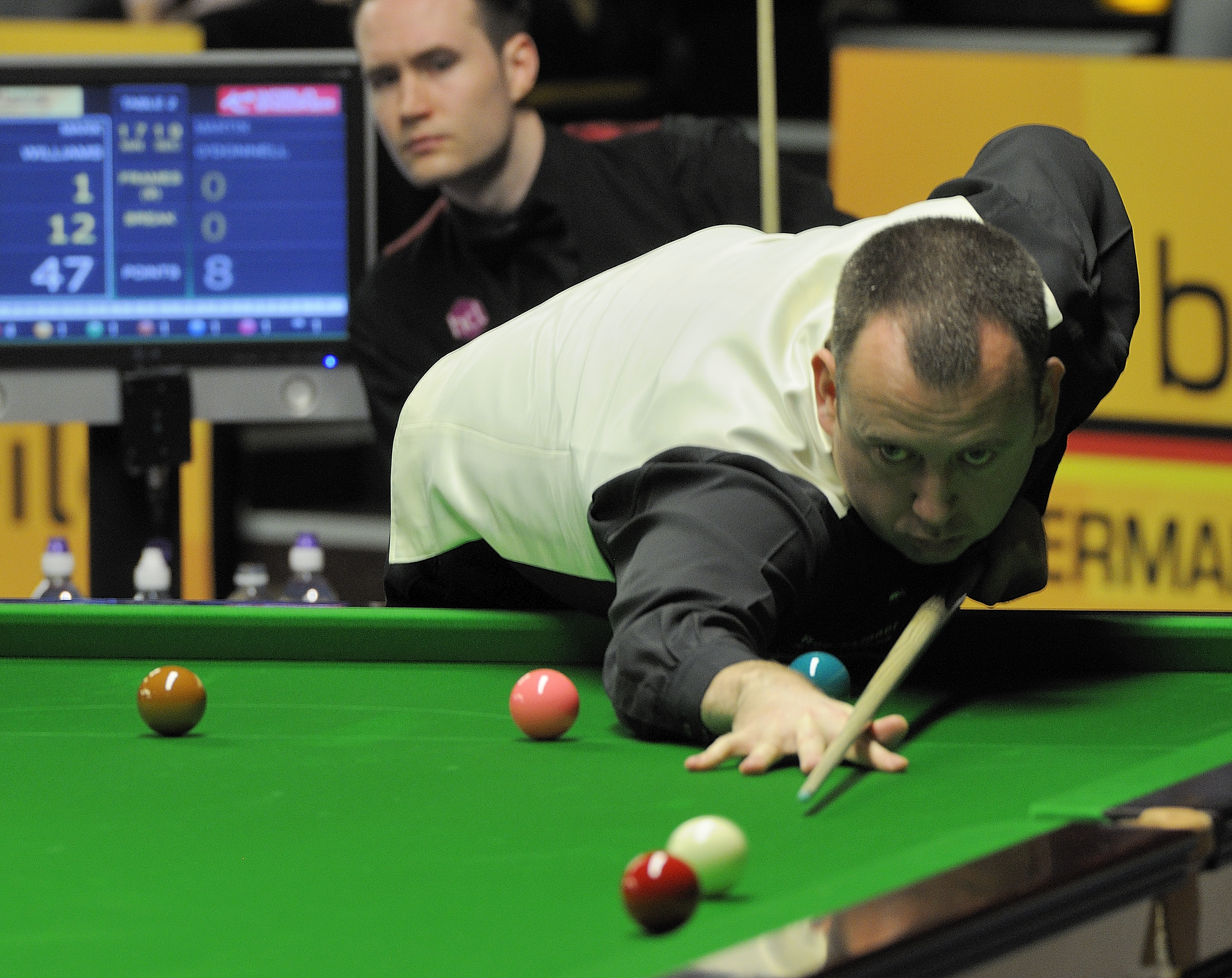
Mark Williams (pictured in 2013) made his first career maximum break in a 10–1 win over Robert Milkins.

The first round was played 16–21 April as best-of-19-frames matches played over two sessions. Defending champion Ronnie O'Sullivan played Stephen Maguire. O'Sullivan lead the match after the first session, 5–4, but in the second session Maguire won five straight frames to go one frame from victory. Trailing 7–9, O'Sullivan won the next three frames with a break of 68 in the 19th frame to win 10–9. Mark Williams made his first career maximum break of 147 in a ranking tournament during his 10–1 first round win over Robert Milkins. Williams made the break in frame 11 to win the match. It was the sixth maximum break in all at the world championships.

Three players made their debut at the world championship through the qualifiers. The first debutant, Michael Holt, played eighth seed Paul Hunter. Hunter had recently been diagnosed with stomach cancer; the match against Holt being his first since the diagnosis. Hunter led the match at 5–4 after the first session but lost the first three frames of the second session. Later, trailing at 6–9 behind, he made a break of 120 in frame 16 and also won the next to trail 8–9. Holt, however, won frame 18 to win the match. The second debutant, Neil Robertson, lost to Stephen Hendry. Hendry held a 7–2 lead after the first session, but Robertson won four frames in a row, including a break of 110. Hendry, however, won the match 10–7 but commented his "attitude wasn't great" going into the second session, as he had a five frame lead. The final debutant, Mark Selby, lost to John Higgins. Higgins edged the first session of the match 5–4, but won five of the next six frames to win 10–5, including breaks of 138 and 136.

Sixteenth seed Marco Fu played Ali Carter in the first round, but was defeated 4–10. Stephen Lee defeated Maltese player Tony Drago 10–5 by capitalising on a 6–3 lead after the first session. Quinten Hann won only one frame in the opening session against Peter Ebdon. On the resumption of play, Ebdon won the second frame of the second session to win the match. Hann turned up to the event with a hangover and using a friend's cue. Chris Small had been struggling with the spinal condition ankylosing spondylitis all season. He played against qualifier Shaun Murphy. Murphy took a 5–4 lead after the first session and won five of the next six to win the match 10–5. After the match, Small commented that he "may not be back" due to the spinal condition. Small retired from professional snooker shortly after the match.

World number six Matthew Stevens held a three frame lead over Andy Hicks after the first session. He increased his lead to 8–3 with a break of 105. Stevens won two additional frames to win the match 10–5. Alan McManus was ahead of Drew Henry 5–4 after the first session, but a 128 by Henry levelled the scores at 5–5. The pair were even for the remainder of the match, going to a deciding frame at 9–9. McManus won frame 19 with a break of 63 to win the match 10–9. The previous year's runner up Graeme Dott played world number 17 Ian McCulloch. McCulloch lead 6–3 after the first session before a 111 break put him four frames ahead. McCulloch lead at 8–5, but Dott then won four frames to take the lead. McCulloch managed won the next two frames to win the match. He celebrated his victory wildly, even dancing a jig. Also in the first round, six-time winner Steve Davis defeated Gerard Greene, David Gray defeated by Anthony Hamilton, Jimmy White defeated Fergal O'Brien, and Ken Doherty defeated Barry Pinches.

=== Second round ===
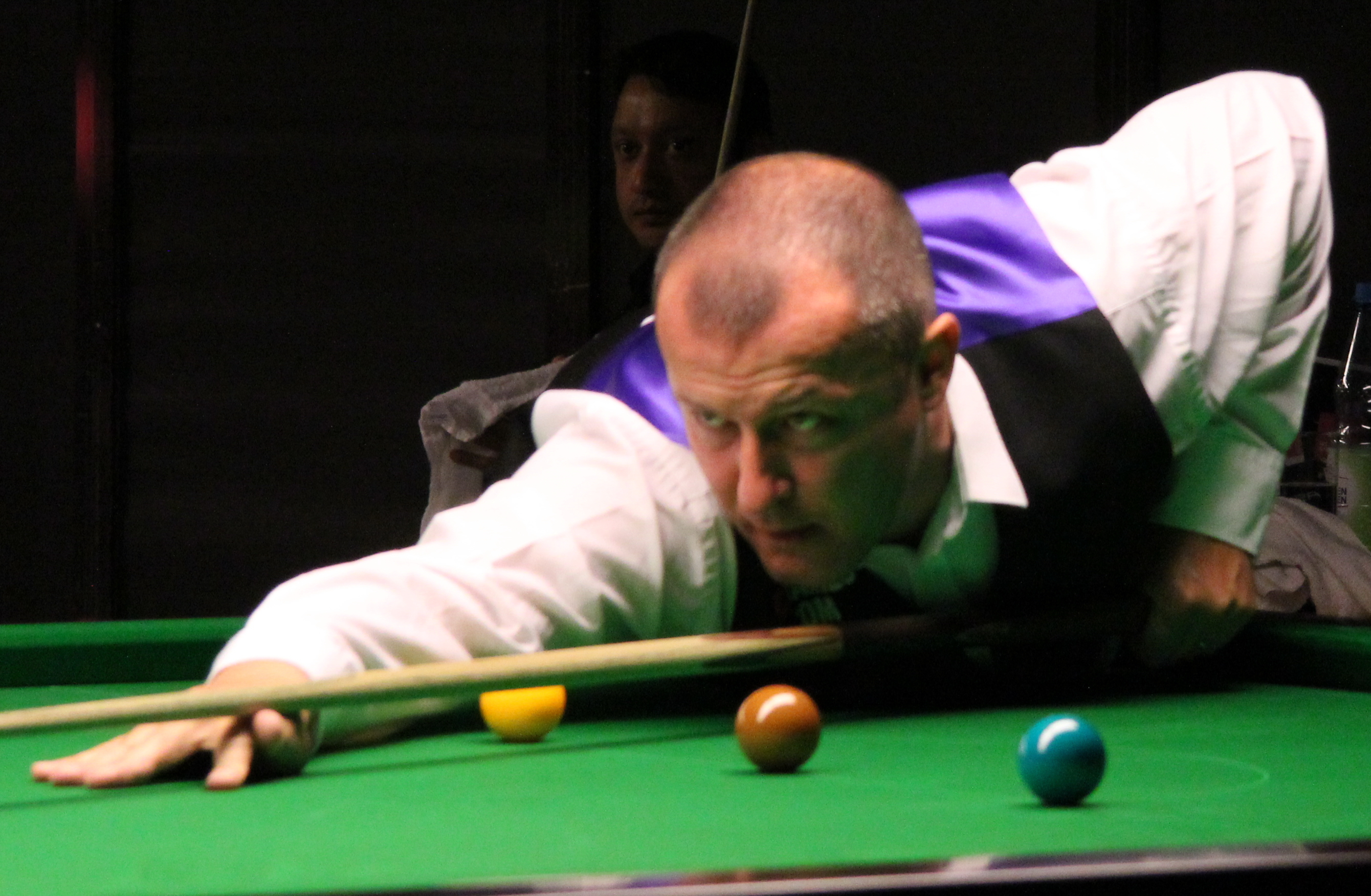
Ian McCulloch (pictured in 2011) defeated Mark Williams 13–12.

The second round was played 21–25 April as best-of-25-frames matches held over three sessions. O'Sullivan led Carter 9–7 after the first two sessions, before winning all four frames of the final session to win 13–7. Despite the win, he stated he was "frustrated with [his] own game". Peter Ebdon trailed by four frames after the first session and lost two of the next three to trail 3–8. However, Ebdon won 10 of the next 11 frames to win the match 13–9. Shaun Murphy led 1998 champion John Higgins 9–7 after two sessions, then won the match 13–8 after a break of 108.

Steve Davis trailed debutant Michael Holt 2–6 and 8–10, but won five frames in a row to win 13–10. Seven-time winner Stephen Hendry took only two of the three available sessions to defeat world number 25 Anthony Hamilton 13–3. Hendry led 6–2 after the first session, then won seven of the eight frames in the second. Matthew Stevens held a 12–4 lead after two sessions against Jimmy White. Stevens won frame 18 in a 30-minute session to win 13–5. Alan McManus and Ken Doherty were tied 8–8 after two sessions. Doherty won the next two frames in session three, before McManus leveled the score at 10–10. Doherty lead again after winning frame 21, but McManus won the next two frames to lead 12–11. In frame 24, Doherty missed a black ball, allowing McManus to win the match with a break of 81. Two-time champion Mark Williams led Ian McCulloch 5–3 after the first session. McCulloch won six frames in the next session, including two century breaks, to lead 9–7. At the start of the final session, Williams won four straight frames, then McCulloch equalled the scores at 11–11. McCulloch won frame 23, then Williams made a break of 84 to tie the match at 12–12. McCulloch won the deciding frame.

=== Quarter-finals ===
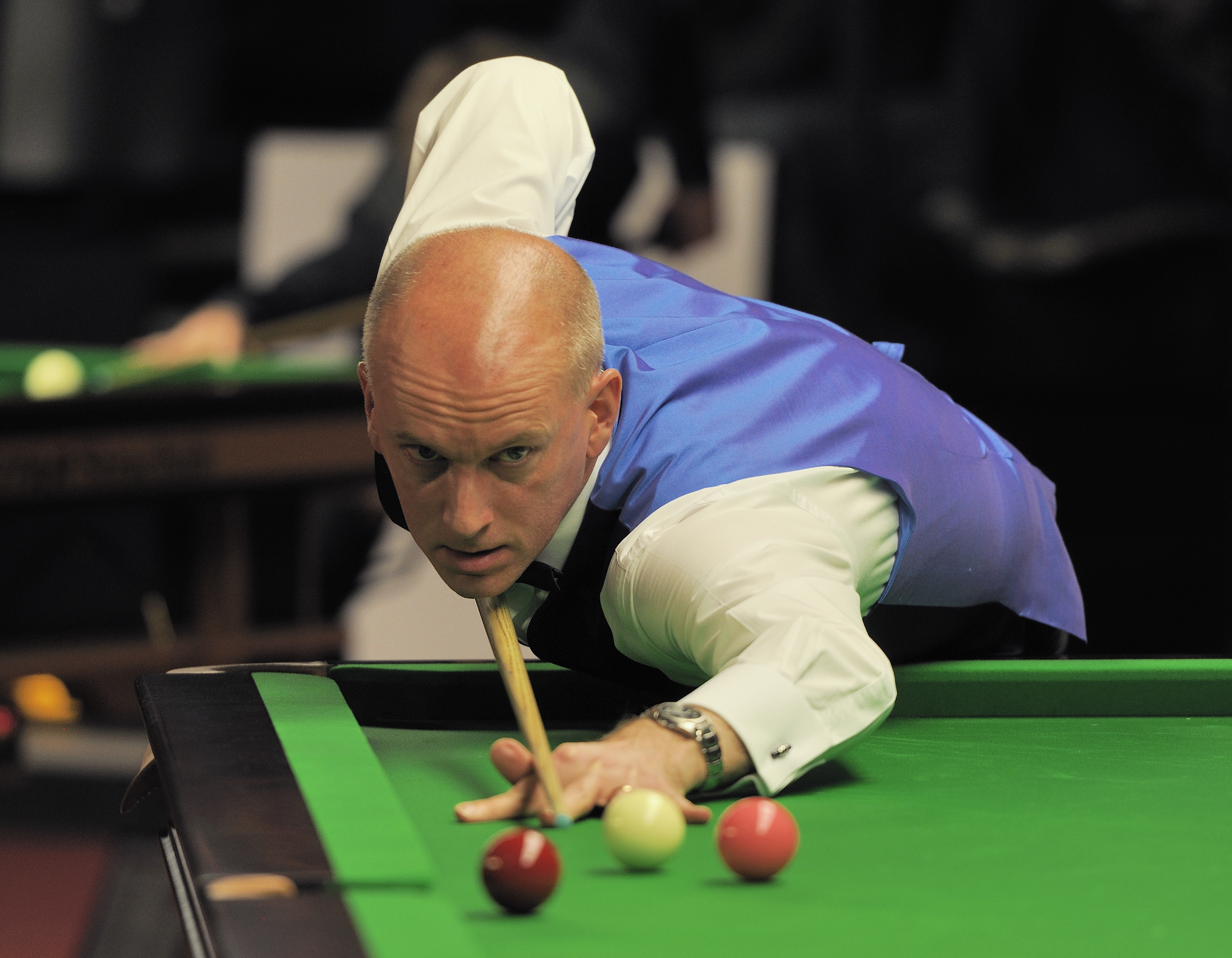
Peter Ebdon (pictured in 2014) defeated the defending champion Ronnie O'Sullivan 13–11.

The quarter-finals were played on 26 and 27 April as best-of-25-frames matches over three sessions. Defending champion Ronnie O'Sullivan played Peter Ebdon in the first quarter-final. O'Sullivan made two century breaks in the opening session to lead 6–2, then won the first two frames of the second session to lead 8–2. Ebdon won four of the next six frames to trail 6–10 going into the final session. Ebdon's slow, deliberate play in the final session made O'Sullivan lose concentration, leaving Ebdon to win 13–11. At one point during the match, Ebdon took five and a half minutes to make a break of 12, significantly longer than O'Sullivan's maximum break in 1997. During the match, Ebdon took over three minutes on one shot, with O'Sullivan asking an audience member what time it was.

Steve Davis reached his first quarter-final since 1996. He played qualifier Shaun Murphy. Murphy won seven of the first eight frames of the match, then led 12–4 after two sessions. He won the opening frame of the final session to win 13–4. Stephen Hendry lost 11–13 to Matthew Stevens. After two sessions, the match was tied at 9–9, then Hendry won the next two frames before Stevens won four in a row to progress to the semi-finals.

=== Semi-finals ===
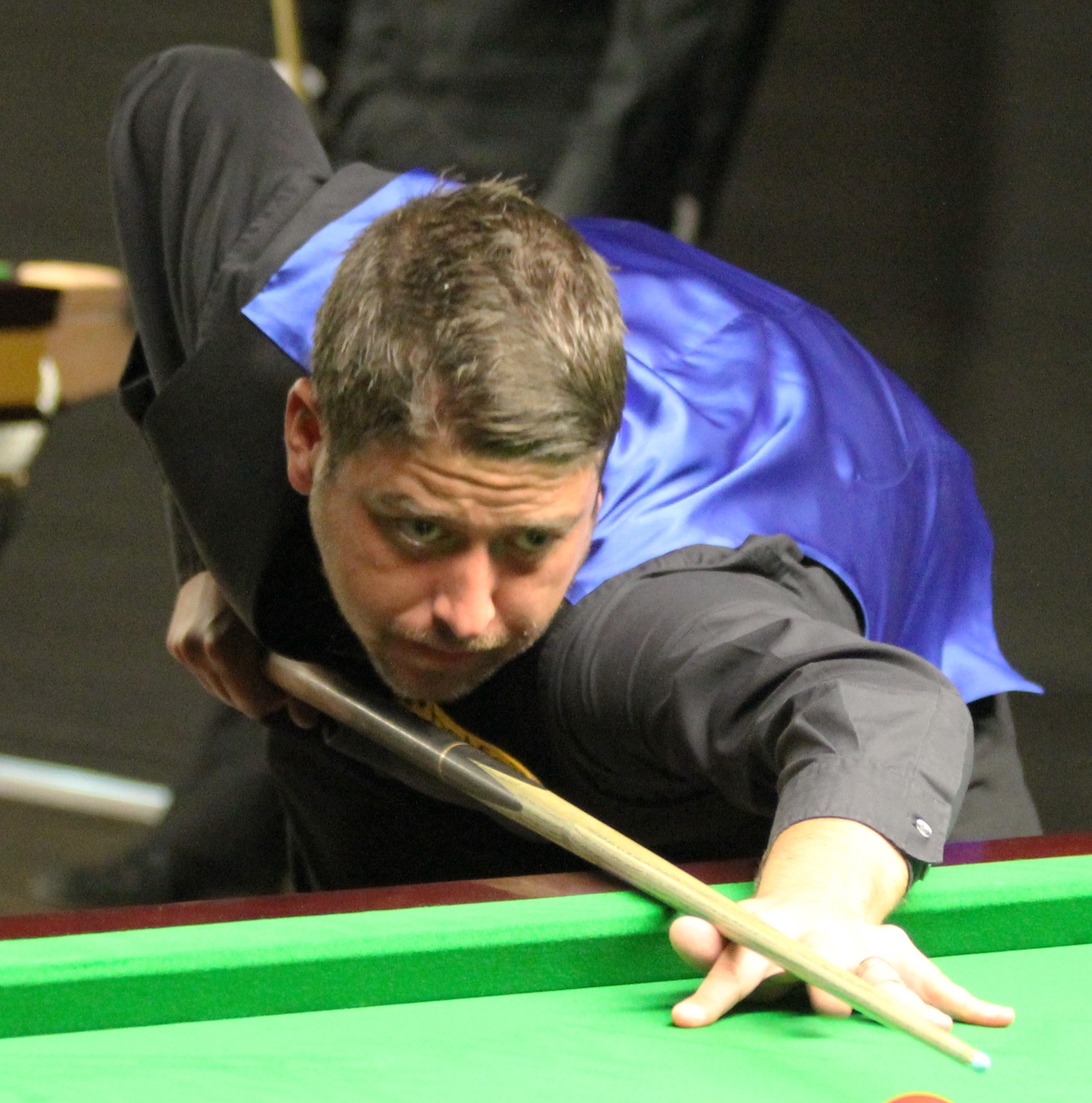
Matthew Stevens (pictured in 2012) reached his second final after defeating Ian McCulloch 17–14.

The semi-finals were played 28–30 April as best-of-33-frames matches over four sessions. The first semi-final was played between Peter Ebdon and Shaun Murphy. Ebdon made two century breaks in the first session to take a 6–2 lead in just 80 minutes, but Murphy levelled the match at 12–12 after three sessions. In the final session, Murphy won all five frames with breaks of 62, 47, 72, 60, and 123 to win the match 17–12. By winning, Murphy was only the fourth qualifier to reach the final.

Ian McCulloch and Matthew Stevens played the second semi-final. Stevens trailed 2–6 after the first session, but he leveled the match at 8–8 after the second session. The match was still tied at the end of the third session. In the final session, Stevens won frame 25 with a break of 50, but McCulloch won the next to tie the match at 13–13. Stevens won the next three frames, making a maximum break attempt in frame 27. McCulloch won the next frame, but Stevens won frame 31 to complete a 17–14 victory.

=== Final ===
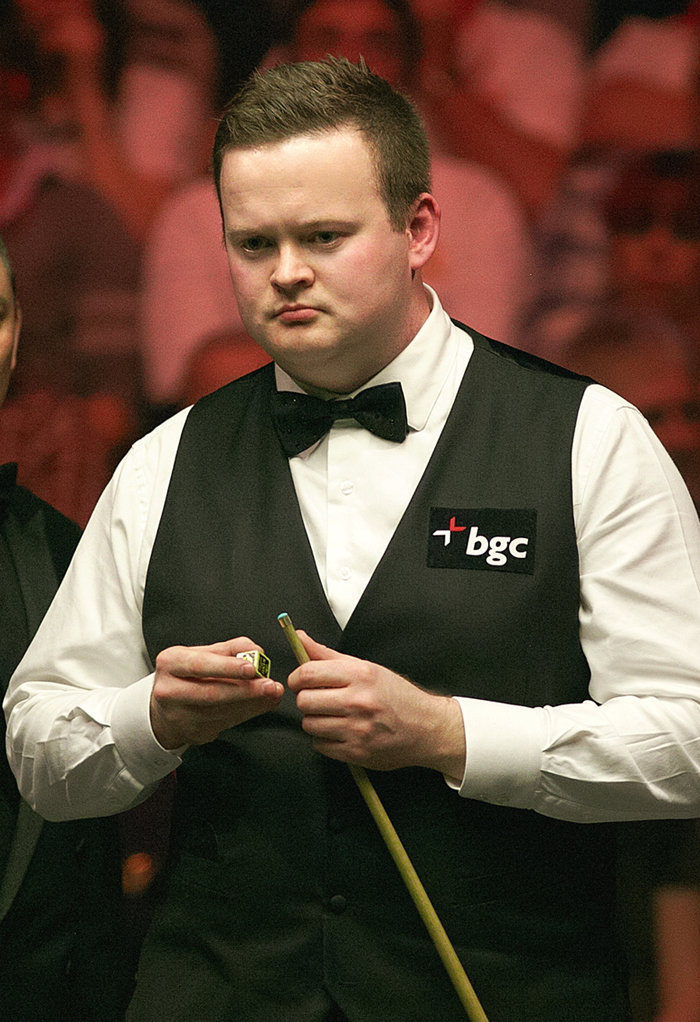
Shaun Murphy (pictured in 2012) won the event; the first qualifier to win the World Championship since 1979.

The final between Shaun Murphy and Matthew Stevens was held 1–2 May 2005. It was played as a best-of-35-frames match over four sessions. Stevens had previously reached the final of the 2000 World Snooker Championship (losing 16–18 to Mark Williams) and won the 2003 UK Championship. Before this event, Murphy had not reached a ranking event final. His best was reaching the semi-finals at the 2004 British Open, before losing 6–0 to John Higgins. Stevens led 10–6 after the second session and 12–11 at the end of the third session. However, Murphy defeated Stevens 18–16.

Murphy had 150–1 odds to win at the start of the tournament and became the first qualifier to win the tournament since Terry Griffiths in 1979. In winning the event he was the second youngest world champion after Stephen Hendry in 1990. Murphy made three century breaks during the final to Stevens' one, the highest of which was a 137.

== Main draw ==
Shown below are the results for each round. The numbers in parentheses beside some of the players are their seeding ranks, while players in bold denote match winners.

**First round** Best of 19 frames
16 April
**Ronnie O'Sullivan (ENG) (1)**	**10**
Stephen Maguire (SCO)	9
19 April
Marco Fu (HKG) (16)	4
**Ali Carter (ENG)**	**10**
20 & 21 April
**Stephen Lee (ENG) (9)**	**10**
Tony Drago (MLT)	5
20 April
**Peter Ebdon (ENG) (8)**	**10**
Quinten Hann (AUS)	2
18 & 19 April
**John Higgins (SCO) (5)**	**10**
Mark Selby (ENG)	5
17 & 18 April
Chris Small (SCO) (12)	5
**Shaun Murphy (ENG)**	**10**
16 & 17 April
**Steve Davis (ENG) (13)**	**10**
Gerard Greene (NIR)	9
17 & 18 April
Paul Hunter (ENG) (4)	8
**Michael Holt (ENG)**	**10**
19 & 20 April
**Stephen Hendry (SCO) (3)**	**10**
Neil Robertson (AUS)	7
16 & 17 April
David Gray (ENG) (14)	8
**Anthony Hamilton (ENG)**	**10**
18 & 19 April
**Jimmy White (ENG) (11)**	**10**
Fergal O'Brien (IRL)	5
16 & 17 April
**Matthew Stevens (WAL) (6)**	**10**
Andy Hicks (ENG)	5
18 April
**Ken Doherty (IRL) (7)**	**10**
Barry Pinches (ENG)	5
16 & 17 April
**Alan McManus (SCO) (10)**	**10**
Drew Henry (SCO)	9
20 & 21 April
Graeme Dott (SCO) (15)	9
**Ian McCulloch (ENG)**	**10**
19 & 20 April
**Mark Williams (WAL) (2)**	**10**
Robert Milkins (ENG)	1

**Second round** Best of 25 frames
21, 22 & 23 April
(England) **Ronnie O'Sullivan (1)**	**13**
(England) Ali Carter	7
24 & 25 April
(England) Stephen Lee (9)	9
(England) **Peter Ebdon (8)**	**13**
23, 24 & 25 April
(Scotland) John Higgins (5)	8
(England) **Shaun Murphy**	**13**
22 & 23 April
(England) **Steve Davis (13)**	**13**
(England) Michael Holt	10
21 & 22 April
(Scotland) **Stephen Hendry (3)**	**13**
(England) Anthony Hamilton	3
23, 24 & 25 April
(England) Jimmy White (11)	5
(Wales) **Matthew Stevens (6)**	**13**
22 & 23 April
(Republic of Ireland) Ken Doherty (7)	11
(Scotland) **Alan McManus (10)**	**13**
24 & 25 April
(England) **Ian McCulloch**	**13**
(Wales) Mark Williams (2)	12

**Quarter-finals**; Best of 25 frames
26 & 27 April
(England) Ronnie O'Sullivan (1)	11
(England) **Peter Ebdon (8)**	**13**
26 & 27 April
(England) **Shaun Murphy**	**13**
(England) Steve Davis (13)	4
26 & 27 April
(Scotland) Stephen Hendry (3)	11
(Wales) **Matthew Stevens (6)**	**13**
26 & 27 April
(Scotland) Alan McManus (10)	8
(England) **Ian McCulloch**	**13**

**Semi-finals**; Best of 33 frames
28, 29 & 30 April
(England) Peter Ebdon (8)	12
(England) **Shaun Murphy**	**17**
28, 29 & 30 April
(Wales) **Matthew Stevens (6)**	**17**
(England) Ian McCulloch	14

**Final**; Best of 35 frames
1 & 2 May
(England) **Shaun Murphy**	**18**
(Wales) Matthew Stevens (6)	16

=== Final: frame scores ===
**Final** (Best of 35 frames) Crucible Theatre, Sheffield, 1 & 2 May 2005. Referee: Eirian Williams.
**Shaun Murphy**
England
**18**–16
Matthew Stevens (6)
Wales
**67**–30, 0–98, 20–103, **68**–55, 29–65, 22–61, **76**–34, 46–56, 53–58, 38–70, **125**–0, **79**–6, 24–105, 5–86, **103**–9, 58–68, **78**–22, **84**–11, 5–64, **80**–60, **137**–0, **64**–57, 20–88, **131**–1, **72**–35, 0–95, **81**–4, **68**–37, 1–83, **85**–35, 0–124, 1–71, **97**–0, **83**–28
Century breaks: 4
(Murphy 3, Stevens 1)

Highest break by Murphy: 137
Highest break by Stevens: 124

67–30, 0–**98**, 20–**103**, 68–55, 29–**61**, 22–**65**, 76–34, 46–**56**, 53–**58**, 38–**70**, 125–0, 79–6, 24–**105**, 5–**86**, 103–9, 58–**68**, 78–22, 84–11, 5–**64**, 80–60, 137–0, 64–57, 20–**88**, 131–1, 72–35, 0–**95**, 81–4, 68–37, 1–**83**, 85–35, 0–**124**, 1–**71**, 97–0, 83–28
(England) **Shaun Murphy** wins the 2005 Embassy World Snooker Championship

== Qualifying results ==
The qualifying tournament featured 70 participants and was played from 23 February to 24 March 2005. The qualifiers consisted of five rounds, which were played at Pontin's, Prestatyn Sands, Wales. The first four qualifying rounds were played from 23 February to 1 March 2005, while the final round was played 23–24 March 2005. Of the 70 participants, 16 players qualified for the main draw, with players seeded by their world rankings. The 1991 champion John Parrott failed to qualify for the first time in his career, losing to Fergal O'Brien 8–10 in the final qualifying round.

Round 1

Stuart Mann (ENG) 10–8 Liu Song (CHN)

Justin Astley (ENG) 10–9 Steve James (ENG)

Hugh Abernethy (SCO) 10–6 Matthew Selt (ENG)

Ben Woollaston (ENG) 10–6 Mark Joyce (ENG)

Lee Spick (ENG) 10–5 David Gilbert (ENG)

Craig Steadman (ENG) 10–9 Kurt Maflin (NOR)

Rounds 2–5

Round 2 (Best of 19 frames)
(Republic of Ireland) Joe Delaney	10
(Republic of Ireland) David McDonnell	8
(England) Adam Davies	10
(England) Mike Hallett	5
(England) Stuart Mann	w/o
(England) Craig Butler	w/d
(England) Alfie Burden	10
(China) Jin Long	3
(England) Paul Wykes	10
(Netherlands) Stefan Mazrocis	9
(England) Tom Ford	10
(England) Justin Astley	6
(Pakistan) Shokat Ali	10
(Scotland) Hugh Abernethy	6
(Scotland) Scott MacKenzie	10
(England) Joe Jogia	3
(Republic of Ireland) Leo Fernandez	10
(England) Paul Davison	7
(Wales) Darren Morgan	10
(England) Ben Woollaston	9
(England) Lee Spick	10
(China) Ding Junhui	7
(England) Paul Davies	10
(Northern Ireland) Sean O'Neill	1
(England) Andrew Norman	10
(England) Craig Steadman	4
(England) Brian Salmon	w/o
(England) David Hall	w/d
(England) Simon Bedford	10
(Republic of Ireland) Rodney Goggins	2
(England) Ricky Walden	10
(England) Gary Wilson	7

Round 3 (Best of 19 frames)
(England) Sean Storey	2
(Republic of Ireland) Joe Delaney	10
(England) Rod Lawler	10
(England) Adam Davies	5
(Australia) Neil Robertson	10
(England) Stuart Mann	6
(England) Jimmy Michie	3
(England) Alfie Burden	10
(England) Gary Wilkinson	9
(England) Paul Wykes	10
(England) Mike Dunn	10
(England) Tom Ford	6
(England) David Roe	6
(Pakistan) Shokat Ali	10
(Wales) Anthony Davies	7
(Scotland) Scott MacKenzie	10
(England) Rory McLeod	10
(Republic of Ireland) Leo Fernandez	7
(Scotland) Jamie Burnett	5
(Wales) Darren Morgan	10
(Belgium) Bjorn Haneveer	7
(England) Lee Spick	10
(England) Nick Walker	5
(England) Paul Davies	10
(Scotland) Marcus Campbell	10
(England) Andrew Norman	7
(England) Adrian Gunnell	10
(England) Brian Salmon	3
(England) Andy Hicks	10
(England) Simon Bedford	7
(Wales) Lee Walker	0
(England) Ricky Walden	10

Round 4 (Best of 19 frames)
(Republic of Ireland) Fergal O'Brien	10
(Republic of Ireland) Joe Delaney	3
(England) Nigel Bond	10
(England) Rod Lawler	7
(England) Nick Dyson	8
(Australia) Neil Robertson	10
(England) Dave Harold	10
(England) Alfie Burden	5
(Finland) Robin Hull	9
(England) Paul Wykes	10
(England) Mark Selby	10
(England) Mike Dunn	2
(Republic of Ireland) Michael Judge	7
(Pakistan) Shokat Ali	10
(Wales) Ryan Day	10
(Scotland) Scott MacKenzie	5
(Thailand) James Wattana	10
(England) Rory McLeod	8
(Northern Ireland) Patrick Wallace	6
(Wales) Darren Morgan	10
(England) Stuart Bingham	10
(England) Lee Spick	2
(England) Brian Morgan	8
(England) Paul Davies	10
(England) Shaun Murphy	10
(Scotland) Marcus Campbell	3
(England) Stuart Pettman	4
(England) Adrian Gunnell	10
(England) Mark Davis	5
(England) Andy Hicks	10
(England) Barry Hawkins	9
(England) Ricky Walden	10

Round 5 (Best of 19 frames)
(England) John Parrott	8
(Republic of Ireland) Fergal O'Brien	10
(Malta) Tony Drago	10
(England) Nigel Bond	4
(England) Mark King	9
(Australia) Neil Robertson	10
(England) Barry Pinches	10
(England) Dave Harold	6
(Scotland) Drew Henry	10
(England) Paul Wykes	6
(England) Joe Perry	2
(England) Mark Selby	10
(Australia) Quinten Hann	10
(Pakistan) Shokat Ali	5
(Scotland) Stephen Maguire	10
(Wales) Ryan Day	5
(England) Ali Carter	10
(Thailand) James Wattana	0
(England) Anthony Hamilton	10
(Wales) Darren Morgan	2
(England) Michael Holt	10
(England) Stuart Bingham	8
(Northern Ireland) Gerard Greene	10
(England) Paul Davies	5
(Northern Ireland) Joe Swail	8
(England) Shaun Murphy	10
(England) Robert Milkins	10
(England) Adrian Gunnell	3
(Wales) Dominic Dale	5
(England) Andy Hicks	10
(England) Ian McCulloch	10
(England) Ricky Walden	9

== Century breaks ==
There were 63 centuries in the 2005 World Snooker Championship. The highest was a maximum break made by Williams in the 11th frame in his first round win over Robert Milkins.

- 147, 133, 102 – Mark Williams
- 138, 114, 108, 103 – Stephen Hendry
- 138, 136, 106 – John Higgins
- 138, 137, 132, 129, 125, 123, 121, 111, 108, 107, 100 – Shaun Murphy
- 137, 125, 115, 101 – Ronnie O'Sullivan
- 135 – Mark Selby
- 129, 124, 121, 106, 105 – Matthew Stevens
- 128 – Drew Henry
- 127, 124, 122, 111, 108, 108, 100 – Ian McCulloch
- 126, 108, 103 – Stephen Lee
- 124 – Chris Small
- 120 – Graeme Dott
- 120, 115 – Paul Hunter
- 118, 114, 110 – Steve Davis
- 115, 105 – Peter Ebdon
- 114, 103 – Michael Holt
- 110 – Neil Robertson
- 109, 101 – Ken Doherty
- 107, 104, 103 – Alan McManus
- 105 – Andy Hicks
- 102 – Stephen Maguire
- 102 – Barry Pinches
- 101 – Anthony Hamilton
