= 1995 Australian Open (snooker) =

Australian Open
Tournament information
- Dates: 17–19 September 1995
- Venue: Bentleigh Club
- City: Melbourne
- Country: Australia
- Organisation: WPBSA
- Format: Non-ranking event

Final
- Champion: (England) Anthony Hamilton
- Runner-up: (Scotland) Chris Small
- Score: 9–7

The 1995 Australian Open was a professional non-ranking snooker tournament that took place between 17 and 19 September 1995, at the Bentleigh Club in Melbourne, Australia. The tournament featured many of the same players that participated in the 1995 Australian Masters several days earlier.

Anthony Hamilton won the tournament by defeating Chris Small 9–7 in the final.

== Main draw ==
Round 1 Best of 9 Frames
(England) Anthony Hamilton	5
(Australia) Glen Wilkinson	4
(Australia) Stan Gorski	5
(England) Tony Emmott	0
(Thailand) Anurat Wongjan	5
(Australia) Stuart Lawler	4
(Australia) Greg Jenkins	5
(Australia) Eddie Charlton	0
(Scotland) Chris Small	5
(Thailand) Phaitoon Phonbun	2
(Australia) Warren King	5
(Australia) Ray van den Nouwland	2
(Republic of Ireland) Michael Judge	5
(Malaysia) Yong Kien Foot	1
(Australia) Steve Ebejer	5
(Australia) Nathan Webb	3

Quarter-finals; Best of 9 Frames
(England) Anthony Hamilton	7
(Australia) Stan Gorski	5
(Thailand) Anurat Wongjan	7
(Australia) Greg Jenkins	2
(Scotland) Chris Small	7
(Australia) Warren King	4
(Republic of Ireland) Michael Judge	7
(Australia) Steve Ebejer	1

Semi-finals; Best of 13 Frames
(England) Anthony Hamilton	7
(Thailand) Anurat Wongjan	3
(Scotland) Chris Small	7
(Republic of Ireland) Michael Judge	1

Final; Best of 17 Frames
(England) Anthony Hamilton	9
(Scotland) Chris Small	7
