= 1997 Welsh Open (snooker) =

1997 Regal Welsh Open
Tournament information
- Dates: 24 January – 1 February 1997
- Venue: Newport Leisure Centre
- City: Newport
- Country: Wales
- Organisation: WPBSA
- Format: Ranking event
- Total prize fund: £215,000
- Winner's share: £37,500
- Highest break: Stephen Hendry (SCO) (140)

Final
- Champion: Stephen Hendry (SCO)
- Runner-up: Mark King (ENG)
- Score: 9–2

The 1997 Welsh Open (officially the 1997 Regal Welsh Open) was a professional ranking snooker tournament that took place between 24 January–1 February 1997 at the Newport Leisure Centre in Newport, Wales.

Mark Williams was the defending champion, but lost in the semi-final to Mark King.

Stephen Hendry defeated Mark King 9–2 in the final to win his second Welsh Open title.

== Prize fund ==
The breakdown of prize money for this year is shown below:

- Winner: £37,500
- Runner Up: £21,000
- Semi Finalists: £10,500
- Quarter Finalist: £5,755
- Last 16: £2,940
- Last 32: £1,655
- Last 64: £1,275
- Last 96: £490
- Stage one highest break: £1,000
- Stage two highest break: £5,000
- Stage one maximum break: £5,000
- Stage two maximum break: £20,000
- Total: £215,000

== Main draw ==
Last 64; Best of 9 frames
(Scotland) Stephen Hendry	5
(England) Ian McCulloch	2
(England) Mick Price	5
(England) Mark Johnston-Allen	4
(Thailand) James Wattana	5
(Wales) Steve Newbury	1
(Northern Ireland) Dennis Taylor	5
(Wales) Mark Bennett	2
(Northern Ireland) Terry Murphy	5
(England) Stephen Lee	3
(England) Ronnie O'Sullivan	5
(England) Barry Pinches	2
(England) Nigel Bond	5
(England) Darren Clarke	4
(England) Steve James	5
(Wales) Doug Mountjoy	1
(England) John Parrott	5
(England) Peter Lines	3
(Scotland) Jamie Burnett	5
(England) Neal Foulds	2
(New Zealand) Dene O'Kane	5
(England) Chris Scanlon	4
(Northern Ireland) Dylan Leary	5
(England) Jimmy White	3
(Scotland) John Higgins	5
(Scotland) Graeme Dott	3
(England) Nick Walker	5
(England) Anthony Hamilton	4
(Canada) Alain Robidoux	5
(Scotland) Billy Snaddon	4
(Pakistan) Shokat Ali	5
(England) Jason Ferguson	3
(Wales) Mark Williams	5
(Wales) Dominic Dale	2
(England) Willie Thorne	5
(England) Darryn Walker	4
(Malta) Tony Drago	5
(Scotland) Drew Henry	2
(Thailand) Noppadon Noppachorn	5
(England) Dave Finbow	2
(Wales) Paul Davies	5
(England) Dave Harold	2
(Scotland) Chris Small	5
(England) Joe Johnson	3
(Republic of Ireland) Ken Doherty	5
(England) Paul Wykes	3
(Northern Ireland) Joe Swail	5
(Scotland) Euan Henderson	0
(England) Mark King	5
(England) Steve Davis	4
(Republic of Ireland) Michael Judge	5
(England) Andy Hicks	4
(Wales) Tony Chappel	5
(Scotland) Alan McManus	3
(England) Lee Richardson	5
(England) Rod Lawler	4
(Republic of Ireland) Fergal O'Brien	5
(England) Martin Clark	4
(England) Peter Ebdon	5
(England) Nick Terry	0
(Northern Ireland) Jason Prince	5
(England) Gary Wilkinson	4
(England) Dean Reynolds	5
(Wales) Darren Morgan	3

Last 32; Best of 9 frames
(Scotland) Stephen Hendry	5
(England) Mick Price	2
(Thailand) James Wattana	5
(Northern Ireland) Dennis Taylor	3
(Northern Ireland) Terry Murphy	5
(England) Ronnie O'Sullivan	4
(England) Nigel Bond	5
(England) Steve James	1
(England) John Parrott	5
(Scotland) Jamie Burnett	2
(New Zealand) Dene O'Kane	5
(Northern Ireland) Dylan Leary	1
(Scotland) John Higgins	5
(England) Nick Walker	3
(Canada) Alain Robidoux	5
(Pakistan) Shokat Ali	2
(Wales) Mark Williams	5
(England) Willie Thorne	1
(Malta) Tony Drago	5
(Thailand) Noppadon Noppachorn	1
(Wales) Paul Davies	5
(Scotland) Chris Small	3
(Republic of Ireland) Ken Doherty	5
(Northern Ireland) Joe Swail	0
(England) Mark King	5
(Republic of Ireland) Michael Judge	4
(Wales) Tony Chappel	5
(England) Lee Richardson	3
(Republic of Ireland) Fergal O'Brien	5
(England) Peter Ebdon	4
(Northern Ireland) Jason Prince	5
(England) Dean Reynolds	3

Last 16; Best of 9 frames
(Scotland) Stephen Hendry	5
(Thailand) James Wattana	4
(Northern Ireland) Terry Murphy	5
(England) Nigel Bond	0
(England) John Parrott	5
(New Zealand) Dene O'Kane	4
(Scotland) John Higgins	5
(Canada) Alain Robidoux	2
(Wales) Mark Williams	5
(Malta) Tony Drago	4
(Wales) Paul Davies	5
(Republic of Ireland) Ken Doherty	4
(England) Mark King	5
(Wales) Tony Chappel	1
(Republic of Ireland) Fergal O'Brien	5
(Northern Ireland) Jason Prince	1

Quarter-finals; Best of 9 frames
(Scotland) Stephen Hendry	5
(Northern Ireland) Terry Murphy	3
(England) John Parrott	5
(Scotland) John Higgins	1
(Wales) Mark Williams	5
(Wales) Paul Davies	3
(England) Mark King	5
(Republic of Ireland) Fergal O'Brien	2

Semi-finals; Best of 11 frames
(Scotland) Stephen Hendry	6
(England) John Parrott	2
(Wales) Mark Williams	5
(England) Mark King	6

Final; Best of 17 frames
(Scotland) Stephen Hendry	9
(England) Mark King	2

== Final ==
Final: Best of 17 frames. Referee: Colin Brinded. Newport Leisure Centre, Newport, Wales, 1 February 1997.
Stephen Hendry; Scotland	9–2	Mark King; England
Afternoon: 140–0 (140), 101–5 (101), 29–75, 113–0 (95), 72–50, 110–1 (106), 67–2, 16–96 (58); Evening: 91–26, 71–20, 90–1 (52)
140	Highest break	58
3	Century breaks	0
5	50+ breaks	1
