= 1995–96 snooker season =

Details
- Duration: August 1995 – May 1996
- Tournaments: 29 (10 ranking events)

Triple Crown winners
- UK Championship: (Scotland) Stephen Hendry
- Masters: (Scotland) Stephen Hendry
- World Championship: (Scotland) Stephen Hendry

The 1995–96 snooker season was a series of snooker tournaments played between August 1995 and May 1996. The following table outlines the results for the ranking and the invitational events.

== Calendar ==
Start	Finish	Country	Tournament name	Venue	City	Winner	Runner-up	Score	Ref.
6 Sep	7 Sep	PAK	Red & White Challenge	Liaquat Gymnasium	Islamabad	(England) Nigel Bond	(England) John Parrott	8–6	
14 Sep	16 Sep	AUS	Australian Masters	Bentleigh Club	Melbourne	(England) Anthony Hamilton	(Scotland) Chris Small	8–6	
17 Sep	19 Sep	AUS	Australian Open	Bentleigh Club	Melbourne	(England) Anthony Hamilton	(Scotland) Chris Small	9–7	
19 Sep	24 Sep	SCO	Scottish Masters	Civic Centre	Motherwell	(Scotland) Stephen Hendry	(England) Peter Ebdon	9–5	
30 Sep	7 Oct	THA	Thailand Classic	Novotel	Bangkok	(England) John Parrott	(England) Nigel Bond	9–6	
6 Oct	14 Oct	SCO	Benson & Hedges Championship	JP Snooker Centre	Edinburgh	(Wales) Matthew Stevens	(Scotland) Paul McPhillips	9–3	
16 Oct	29 Oct	ENG	Grand Prix	Crowtree Centre	Sunderland	(Scotland) Stephen Hendry	(Scotland) John Higgins	9–5	
30 Oct	5 Nov	MLT	Malta Grand Prix	Jerma Palace Hotel	Marsaskala	(England) Peter Ebdon	(Scotland) John Higgins	7–4	
17 Nov	3 Dec	ENG	UK Championship	Guild Hall	Preston	(Scotland) Stephen Hendry	(England) Peter Ebdon	10–3	
3 Dec	10 Dec	GER	German Open	Frankfurt Messe	Frankfurt	(Scotland) John Higgins	(Republic of Ireland) Ken Doherty	9–3	
? Dec	? Dec	BEL	Belgian Masters		Antwerp	(Wales) Matthew Stevens	(Belgium) Patrick Delsemme	7–1	
3 Jan	7 Jan	ENG	Charity Challenge	International Convention Centre	Birmingham	(England) Ronnie O'Sullivan	(Scotland) John Higgins	9–6	
? Jan	18 Jan	CHN	Guangzhou Masters	White Swan Club	Guangzhou	(Malta) Tony Drago	(England) Steve Davis	6–2	
27 Jan	3 Feb	WAL	Welsh Open	Newport Centre	Newport	(Wales) Mark Williams	(England) John Parrott	9–3	
4 Feb	11 Feb	ENG	The Masters	Wembley Conference Centre	London	(Scotland) Stephen Hendry	(England) Ronnie O'Sullivan	10–5	
17 Feb	24 Feb	ENG	International Open	Link Centre	Swindon	(Scotland) John Higgins	(England) Rod Lawler	9–3	
25 Feb	3 Mar	MLT	European Open	Mediterranean Conference Centre	Valletta	(England) John Parrott	(England) Peter Ebdon	9–7	
? Mar	? Mar	FIN	Finnish Masters	Hesperia, Hotel	Helsinki	(England) Rod Lawler	(England) Stefan Mazrocis	6–2	
11 Mar	17 Mar	THA	Thailand Open	Montien Riverside Hotel	Bangkok	(Scotland) Alan McManus	(Republic of Ireland) Ken Doherty	9–8	
? Mar	? Mar	CHN	China Masters	Haidien Gymnasium	Beijing	(England) Rod Lawler	(Pakistan) Shokat Ali	6–3	
26 Mar	31 Mar	IRL	Irish Masters	Goff's	Kill	(Wales) Darren Morgan	(England) Steve Davis	9–8	
1 Apr	8 Apr	ENG	British Open	Plymouth Pavilions	Plymouth	(England) Nigel Bond	(Scotland) John Higgins	9–8	
20 Apr	6 May	ENG	World Snooker Championship	Crucible Theatre	Sheffield	(Scotland) Stephen Hendry	(England) Peter Ebdon	18–12	
23 Apr	26 Apr	PAK	Pakistan Masters		Karachi	(Thailand) Noppadon Noppachorn	(England) Brian Morgan	7–5	
28 Dec	12 May	ENG	European League	Diamond Centre	Irthlingborough	(Republic of Ireland) Ken Doherty	(England) Steve Davis	10–5	
15 May	19 May	MLT	Malta Masters	Jerma Palace Hotel	Marsascala	(England) Mark Davis	(England) John Read	6–3	
20 May	23 May	MAS	Malaysian Masters	Genting Highlands	Pahang	(Wales) Dominic Dale	(Scotland) Drew Henry	8–3	
? May	? May	WAL	Pontins Professional	Pontins	Prestatyn	(Republic of Ireland) Ken Doherty	(England) Nigel Bond	9–7	
28 May	31 May	POL	Poland Masters	Atelier Snooker Club	Warsaw	(Northern Ireland) Gerard Greene	(Northern Ireland) Patrick Wallace	6–5	

Ranking event
Non-ranking event

== Official rankings ==
The top 16 of the world rankings, these players automatically played in the final rounds of the world ranking events and were invited for the Masters.

No.	Ch.	Name	Points
1	Steady	(Scotland) Stephen Hendry	50042
2	Steady	(England) Steve Davis	42395
3	▲	(England) Ronnie O'Sullivan	41255
4	▲	(England) John Parrott	38939
5	▼	(Thailand) James Wattana	38904
6	Steady	(Scotland) Alan McManus	36310
7	▼	(England) Jimmy White	36225
8	Steady	(Wales) Darren Morgan	34970
9	▼	(Republic of Ireland) Ken Doherty	34507
10	Steady	(England) Peter Ebdon	33645
11	▲	(Scotland) John Higgins	29962
12	▼	(England) Nigel Bond	29394
13	▲	(England) Dave Harold	28840
14	▲	(Malta) Tony Drago	25944
15	▼	(Wales) Terry Griffiths	25259
16	▼	(England) David Roe	24156
