= 1998 Grand Prix (snooker) =

Skoda Grand Prix
Tournament information
- Dates: 14–25 October 1998
- Venue: Guild Hall
- City: Preston
- Country: England
- Organisation: WPBSA
- Format: Ranking event
- Total prize fund: £370,000
- Winner's share: £60,000
- Highest break: Peter Ebdon (ENG) (139)

Final
- Champion: Stephen Lee (ENG)
- Runner-up: Marco Fu (HKG)
- Score: 9–2

The 1998 Skoda Grand Prix was a professional ranking snooker tournament that took place between 14 and 25 October 1998 at the Guild Hall in Preston, England which formally hosted the UK Championship for 20 years until 1997. The Bournemouth International Centre which hosted the last two Grand Prixs would swap places with the Guild Hall.

Dominic Dale was the defending champion, but he lost his last 64 match against Robin Hull.

Stephen Lee and Marco Fu both contested a ranking tournament final for the first time in their careers, Fu in his first tournament as a professional being ranked 377 at the time of his final appearance; the lowest ranked finalist at any ranking event. Lee prevailed 9–2 to claim his first ranking title.

== Tournament summary ==
Defending champion Dominic Dale was the number 1 seed with World Champion John Higgins seeded 2. The remaining places were allocated to players based on the world rankings.

== Prize fund ==
The breakdown of prize money for this year is shown below:

- Winner: £60,000
- Runner-up: £32,000
- Semi-final: £16,000
- Quarter-final: £9,100
- Last 16: £4,600
- Last 32: £2,600
- Last 64: £2,225
- Stage one highest break: £1,100
- Stage two highest break: £5,000
- Total: £370,000

== Main draw ==
Last 64; Best of 9 frames
1	(Wales) Dominic Dale	0
(Finland) Robin Hull	5
18	(England) Gary Wilkinson	5
78	(England) Matthew Couch	0
31	(Scotland) Jamie Burnett	5
37	(England) Steve James	1
14	(England) Nigel Bond	5
(Northern Ireland) Patrick Wallace	2
12	(England) Anthony Hamilton	5
93	(England) Leigh Griffin	4
24	(England) Paul Hunter	5
81	(England) Jimmy Michie	2
25	(Scotland) Chris Small	5
76	(England) Stuart Pettman	3
7	(England) John Parrott	5
(Republic of Ireland) Colm Gilcreest	4
8	(England) Peter Ebdon	5
36	(Northern Ireland) Joe Swail	3
32	(Scotland) Billy Snaddon	5
64	(England) Nick Pearce	1
29	(Northern Ireland) Terry Murphy	3
55	(England) Joe Johnson	5
9	(Scotland) Alan McManus	5
54	(England) Dean Reynolds	2
11	(Malta) Tony Drago	2
43	(Scotland) Drew Henry	5
22	(England) Andy Hicks	4
377	(Hong Kong) Marco Fu	5
17	(England) Mark King	5
59	(Northern Ireland) Gerard Greene	2
4	(England) Ronnie O'Sullivan	5
(Malaysia) Sam Chong	3
3	(Scotland) Stephen Hendry	5
60	(England) Ian McCulloch	1
26	(Wales) Matthew Stevens	1
48	(England) David Roe	5
27	(England) Brian Morgan	5
61	(England) David Gray	3
13	(Canada) Alain Robidoux	1
40	(England) Rod Lawler	5
16	(Thailand) James Wattana	1
38	(Scotland) Euan Henderson	5
20	(England) Dave Harold	5
(Malta) Alex Borg	0
19	(England) Jimmy White	4
49	(Pakistan) Shokat Ali	5
5	(Republic of Ireland) Ken Doherty	5
(Republic of Ireland) David McDonnell	0
6	(Wales) Mark Williams	5
58	(Republic of Ireland) Michael Judge	3
23	(Wales) Darren Morgan	5
99	(England) Robert Milkins	4
21	(Republic of Ireland) Fergal O'Brien	5
(England) Mark Johnston-Allen	1
10	(England) Stephen Lee	5
63	(England) Tony Jones	3
15	(England) Steve Davis	4
57	(New Zealand) Dene O'Kane	5
28	(England) Martin Clark	3
35	(England) Jason Ferguson	5
30	(Scotland) Graeme Dott	3
(Scotland) Alan Burnett	5
2	(Scotland) John Higgins	1
45	(Australia) Quinten Hann	5

Last 32; Best of 9 frames
(Finland) Robin Hull	3
18	(England) Gary Wilkinson	5
31	(Scotland) Jamie Burnett	5
14	(England) Nigel Bond	2
12	(England) Anthony Hamilton	5
24	(England) Paul Hunter	1
25	(Scotland) Chris Small	5
7	(England) John Parrott	4
8	(England) Peter Ebdon	5
32	(Scotland) Billy Snaddon	1
55	(England) Joe Johnson	3
9	(Scotland) Alan McManus	5
43	(Scotland) Drew Henry	3
377	(Hong Kong) Marco Fu	5
17	(England) Mark King	2
4	(England) Ronnie O'Sullivan	5
3	(Scotland) Stephen Hendry	5
48	(England) David Roe	0
27	(England) Brian Morgan	5
40	(England) Rod Lawler	2
38	(Scotland) Euan Henderson	2
20	(England) Dave Harold	5
49	(Pakistan) Shokat Ali	5
5	(Republic of Ireland) Ken Doherty	3
6	(Wales) Mark Williams	4
23	(Wales) Darren Morgan	5
21	(Republic of Ireland) Fergal O'Brien	1
10	(England) Stephen Lee	5
57	(New Zealand) Dene O'Kane	4
35	(England) Jason Ferguson	5
(Scotland) Alan Burnett	4
45	(Australia) Quinten Hann	5

Last 16; Best of 9 frames
18	(England) Gary Wilkinson	0
31	(Scotland) Jamie Burnett	5
12	(England) Anthony Hamilton	2
25	(Scotland) Chris Small	5
8	(England) Peter Ebdon	5
9	(Scotland) Alan McManus	0
377	(Hong Kong) Marco Fu	5
4	(England) Ronnie O'Sullivan	2
3	(Scotland) Stephen Hendry	5
27	(England) Brian Morgan	3
20	(England) Dave Harold	5
49	(Pakistan) Shokat Ali	0
23	(Wales) Darren Morgan	2
10	(England) Stephen Lee	5
35	(England) Jason Ferguson	3
45	(Australia) Quinten Hann	5

Quarter-finals; Best of 9 frames
31	(Scotland) Jamie Burnett	3
25	(Scotland) Chris Small	5
8	(England) Peter Ebdon	3
377	(Hong Kong) Marco Fu	5
3	(Scotland) Stephen Hendry	4
20	(England) Dave Harold	5
10	(England) Stephen Lee	5
45	(Australia) Quinten Hann	0

Semi-finals; Best of 11 frames
25	(Scotland) Chris Small	1
377	(Hong Kong) Marco Fu	6
20	(England) Dave Harold	4
10	(England) Stephen Lee	6

Final; Best of 17 frames
377	(Hong Kong) Marco Fu	2
10	(England) Stephen Lee	9

== Final ==
Final: Best of 17 frames. Referee: John Newton. Preston Guild Hall, Preston, England, 25 October 1998.
Marco Fu (377); Hong Kong	2–9	Stephen Lee (10); England
Afternoon: 8–115 (50), 0–128 (128), 17–75 (75), 0–130 (66, 64), 82–4 (82), 33–99 (66), 0–77 (70), 85–12 (85); Evening: 0–107 (90), 1–93 (57), 5–106 (106)
85	Highest break	128
0	Century breaks	2
2	50+ breaks	10

== Century breaks ==
- 139 – Peter Ebdon
- 134 – Ronnie O'Sullivan
- 129 – Martin Clark
- 128, 126, 106, 104 – Stephen Lee
- 123 – Marco Fu
- 121, 111, 110 – Quinten Hann
- 121 – John Parrott
- 120 – Tony Drago
- 115, 107 – Chris Small
- 110 – Dene O'Kane
- 108 – Stephen Hendry
- 106 – Jason Ferguson
- 104, 103 – Dave Harold
- 104, 102 – Mark Williams
