= Anthony Hamilton (snooker player) =

English snooker player (born 1971)

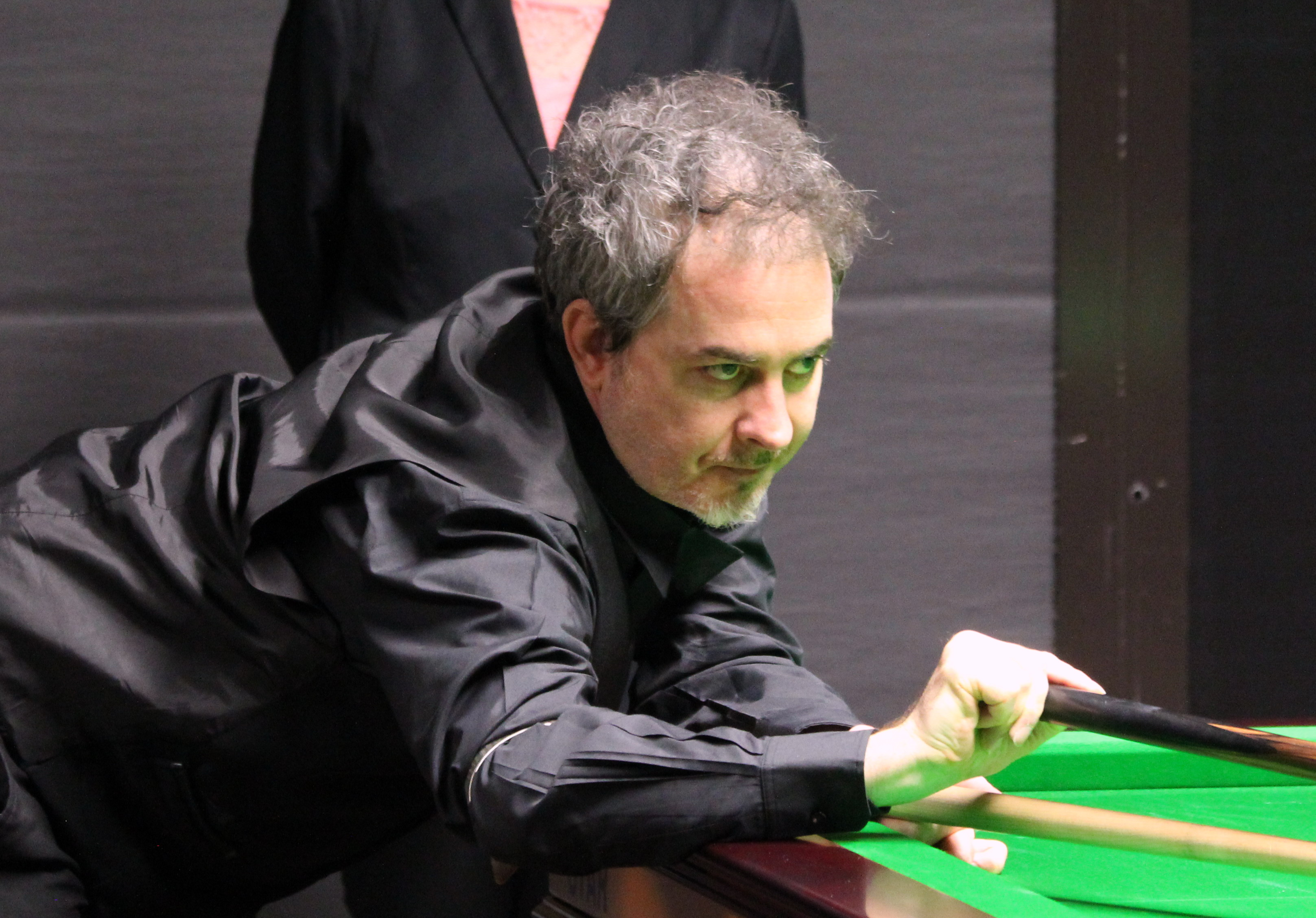
- Hamilton at the 2016 Paul Hunter Classic

Personal information
- Nickname: The Sheriff of Pottingham
- Born: 29 June 1971 (age 55) Nottingham, England

Sport
- Country: England
- Sport: Snooker
- Professional: 1991–2025
- Highest ranking: 10 (1999/2000)
- Century breaks: 326

Tournament wins
- Ranking: 1

Anthony Stephen Hamilton (born 29 June 1971) is an English retired professional snooker player. He turned professional in 1991 and spent fifteen seasons ranked within the top 32, including five within the top 16, reaching a career high of number 10 in the 1999/2000 season. He reached three ranking finals during his career, losing 7–9 to Fergal O'Brien in the 1999 British Open final and 8–9 to Mark Williams in the 2002 China Open final before winning his only ranking title at the 2017 German Masters, beating Ali Carter 9–6 in the final. His best performances in Triple Crown events were reaching four World Snooker Championship quarter-finals, in 2000, 2002, 2004 and 2007, and reaching one Masters semi-final in 1999.

Hamilton lost his professional tour card after his defeat in the 2025 World Snooker Championship qualifiers and announced his retirement in June 2025 after losing in the second event of 2025 Q School.

== Career ==
=== 1991–2000 ===
Hamilton turned professional in 1991 and entered the world's top 32 in 1995/1996.

During this period he reached two ranking tournament finals. In the British Open in 1999, he lost to Fergal O'Brien. Hamilton opened with two centuries, but O'Brien won five frames on the final black to defeat the Nottingham man. The other was the 2001 China Open, in which Mark Williams beat him 9–8, having been 5–8 down. Hamilton made the first of his four World Championship quarter-finals in 2000, losing 3–13 to John Higgins.

=== 2000–2006 ===
He reached the quarter-finals of the World Championship on three later occasions (2002, 2004 and 2007), but without reaching the semi-final stage. In 2002, he lost 6–13 to eventual winner Peter Ebdon. In 2004, Hamilton lost the first seven frames of his quarter-final match against eventual champion Ronnie O'Sullivan and went on to a 3–13 defeat, losing the match with a session to spare. Hamilton's 438 points scored in this match are a record low for a World Championship Quarter-final. He also has the highest ever points total in a first-round match at the Crucible, 1271 against Chris Small in 1999, though he lost this match 9–10. In 1997 he reached the second round; facing John Parrott at this stage, he scored 414 unanswered points in frames 1–5, but still lost the match (this is the second-highest number of unanswered points in Crucible history; the record was set by John Higgins against Hamilton in the second round in 2000). Hamilton did not fare well in the 2006 World Championship, losing 1–10 in the opening round to Mark Williams. However, a strong two seasons ensured that he reclaimed a top-16 place.

=== 2006–2007 ===
Hamilton began the 2006–07 season at the Northern Ireland Trophy, losing 3–5 against Ding Junhui. At the Grand Prix Hamilton lost all five of his group stage matches, and didn't advance to the knockout stage. Hamilton then lost 7–9 against Rod Lawler in the first round of the UK Championship, 3–6 in the wild-card round of the Masters, 4–5 against Tom Ford in the first round of the Malta Cup. Hamilton's best result of the season came at the Welsh Open, where he reached the quarter-finals by defeating both Joe Perry and Dave Harold, before losing his match to Steve Davis in a final-frame decider. Hamilton then lost in the first round of the China Open 4–5 against Mark Selby. Hamilton reached his fourth World Championship quarter-final, pulling off a surprise 10–3 victory over Marco Fu in round 1, and a 13–8 second round win over Ian McCulloch. However, he couldn't advance to the semi-final stage, losing 7–13 to Stephen Maguire. As a result, he did not retain his top sixteen place, falling to number 26 in the rankings for 2007/2008.

=== 2007–2008 ===
Hamilton began the 2007–08 season at the Shanghai Masters, where he lost 4–5 against Adrian Gunnell in the last qualifying round. Hamilton than was eliminated in the round robin stages of the Grand Prix, as he won only two of his five matches. He reached the second round of the Northern Ireland Trophy, by defeating Michael Judge 5–2 in the first round, but lost 2–5 against Shaun Murphy. He could qualify for the televised stage of the 2007 UK Championship, by defeating Barry Pinches 9–6, but lost against Mark Selby 5–9 in the first round. Hamilton then lost in the first round of the Welsh Open 2–5 against Andrew Higginson, and couldn't qualify for the China Open, after losing 1–5 against Marcus Campbell in the last qualifying round. He ensured his qualification for the World Championship with a 10–2 victory over Scott MacKenzie in the final qualifying round, but lost 3–10 to Stephen Maguire in the first round. This saw him drop from number 26 to 31 in the World Rankings at the start of the 2008/2009 season.

=== 2008–2009 ===
In 2008–09 Hamilton did not reach the last sixteen in any of the first five ranking events. He lost in the first round 3–5 against Andrew Higginson at the Northern Ireland Trophy, 2–5 against Marco Fu at the Shanghai Masters, and 0–5 against John Higgins at the Grand Prix, while he did not qualify for the Bahrain Championship and the UK Championship, for he lost in the qualifying rounds: respectively, 2–5 against Mark Davis and 4–9 against Higginson. However he managed a run to the semi-finals of the 2009 Welsh Open. On the way he beat Peter Ebdon, Michael Judge and Mark Selby. In the semi-final he led Ali Carter 3–0 and it looked as though he may reach his third ranking final but eventually lost 5–6 against the eventual winner. Hamilton qualified for the China Open, by defeating Patrick Wallace 5–1, but lost 4–5 against John Higgins, and he couldn't qualify for the World Championship, as he lost 5–10 to Ricky Walden in the last qualifying round. At the end of the season he lost his place among the world's top 32, and was ranked number 33 in the next season.

=== 2009–2010 ===
In 2009–10 season Hamilton couldn't qualify for the first two ranking events, as he lost 0–5 against Jamie Cope at the Shanghai Masters, and 0–5 against David Gilbert at the Grand Prix. His only appearance in the last 32 came at the 2009 UK Championship, where he lost 2–9 against Mark King. Hamilton however couldn't qualify for the last three ranking events, as he lost 4–5 against Bjorn Haneveer at the Welsh Open, 4–5 against Tony Drago at the China Open, and 6–10 against Ford at the 2010 World Snooker Championship.

=== 2010–2011 ===
In 2010/2011 season Hamilton failed to qualify for the first three ranking events as he lost 2–5 against Ricky Walden at the Shanghai Masters, 1–3 against James McBain at the World Open and 3–9 against Rod Lawler at the UK Championship. Hamilton also participated in all Players Tour Championship events, with his best performance coming at the Paul Hunter Classic, where he reached the final, but lost 3–4 against Judd Trump. Hamilton finished 18th on the Players Tour Championship Order of Merit and qualified for the Finals, where he lost 0–4 against Mark Williams in the second round. Hamilton qualified for the German Masters, by defeating Kurt Maflin (5–4), Adam Wicheard (5–1) and Stuart Bingham (5–1) in qualifying stages. He reached the second round by defeating Pavel Leyk (5–1) and Neil Robertson (5–4), before losing against Graeme Dott (2–5). Hamilton couldn't reach the final stages of the last three ranking tournaments, as he lost in the qualifying stages against Matthew Stevens 2–4 at the Welsh Open, 1–5 at the China Open and against Barry Hawkins 5–10 at the World Championship.

=== 2011–2012 ===
Hamilton began the 2011–12 season ranked number 36. Hamilton reached the quarter-finals of the Shanghai Masters by winning five matches, but he lost 2–5 against Mark King. Hamilton, however couldn't qualify for the final stages of the remaining ranking tournaments, as he lost 5–6 against Marco Fu at the UK Championship, 0–5 against Tom Ford at the German Masters, 1–5 against Joe Perry at the World Open, 1–4 against Andy Hicks at the Welsh Open, 1–5 against Perry at the China Open and 9–10 against Ken Doherty at the World Championship. Hamilton also participated in 10 of the 12 Players Tour Championship events, with his best performance coming in event 11, where he reached the semi-finals, losing 3–4 against Martin Gould. Hamilton finished 42nd on the Players Tour Championship Order of Merit, outside of the top 24 who qualified for the Finals.

=== 2012–2013 ===
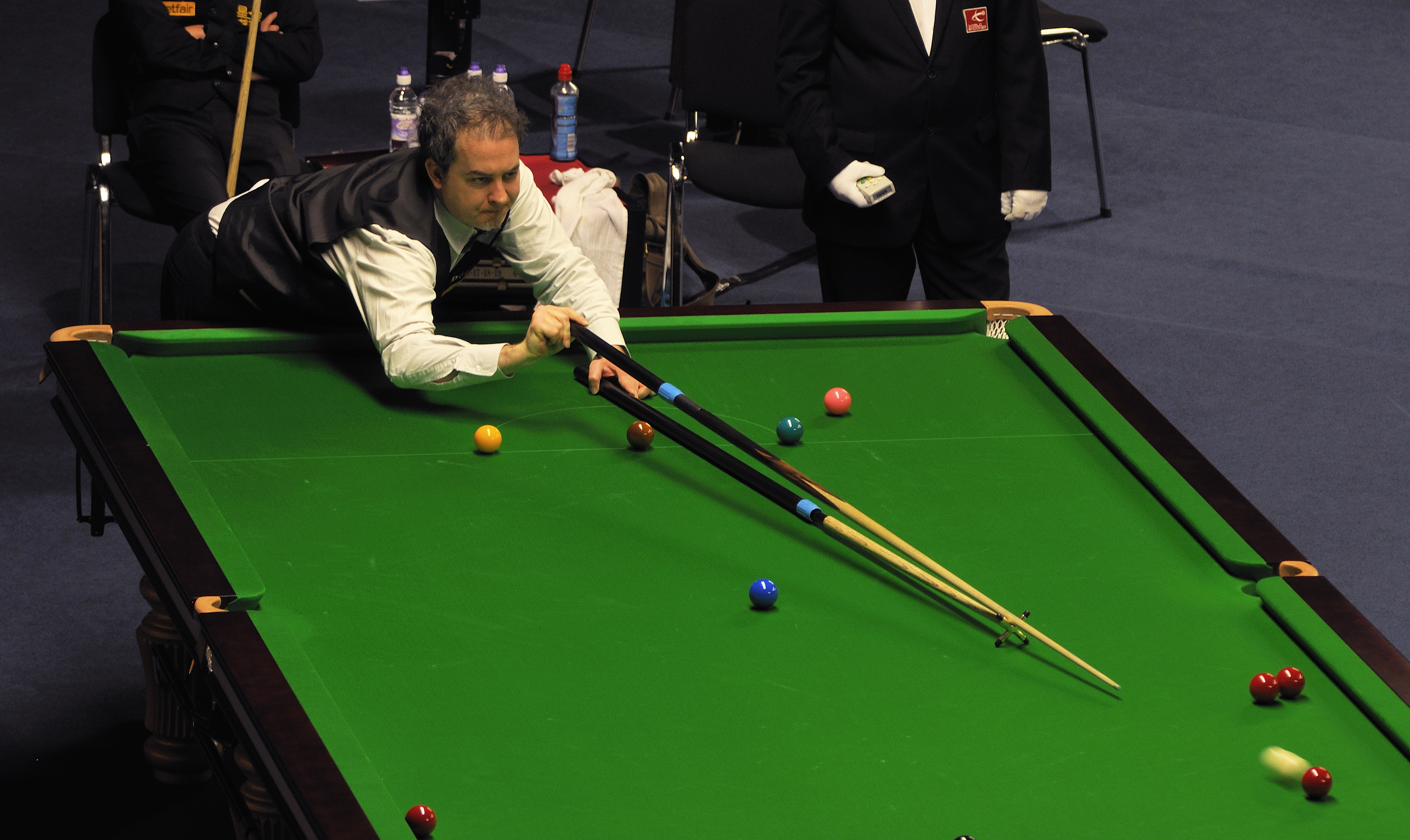
Anthony Hamilton at 2013 German Masters.

Hamilton began the 2012–13 season ranked number 32. He could not qualify for the first four ranking events, as he lost 4–5 against Michael White at the Wuxi Classic, 3–5 against Jimmy Robertson at the Shanghai Masters, 3–6 against Ryan Day at the International Championship and withdrew from the Australian Goldfields Open. He lost 2–6 to Ian Burns in the qualifying stage of the UK Championship, but then defeated Burns 5–2 and Jamie Cope 5–0 to reach the last 32 of the 2013 German Masters. He recorded a 5–4 victory over Judd Trump, and then lost 2–5 to Ali Carter. Hamilton also qualified for the Welsh Open, but lost 2–4 to Stephen Maguire in the last 32. Hamilton played in nine of the ten Players Tour Championship events this season, with his best result coming in the Kay Suzanne Memorial Trophy, where he defeated George Marter, Ryan Causton, Andrew Higginson, Michael Wasley and Mark Selby, before losing 3–4 to John Higgins in the semi-finals. This performance helped him to finish 34th on the PTC Order of Merit, outside of the top 26 who qualified for the Finals. Hamilton's season ended when he lost 4–10 to Dechawat Poomjaeng in the third qualifying round of the World Championship.

=== 2013–2014 ===
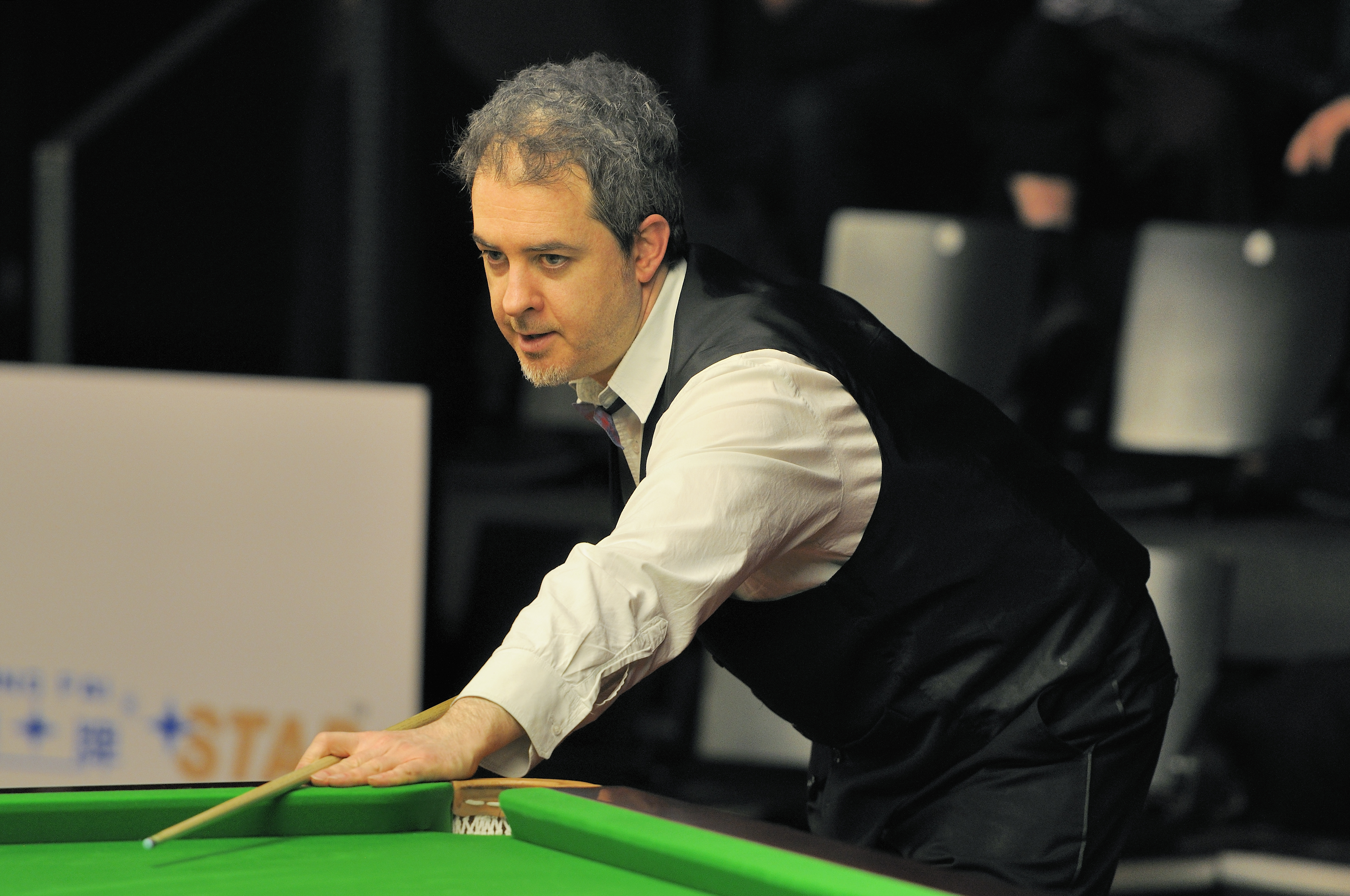
Hamilton at 2014 German Masters

Hamilton began the 2013–14 season ranked number 43, after dropping 11 places in the rankings during the previous season. He qualified for the Wuxi Classic by defeating Jamie O'Neill 5–1. At the venue he defeated Ryan Day, Stuart Bingham and Mark Williams to reach the quarter-final, where he lost 3–5 against Robert Milkins. After this, Hamilton failed to qualify for two of the next three ranking events; he lost 2–5 against Mark Joyce at the Shanghai Masters, and 3–6 against Paul Davison at the International Championship. He qualified for the Indian Open by defeating Michael Wasley 4–2, but withdraw from his last-64 match against Michael White. Hamilton also lost 4–6 against Sean O'Sullivan in the first round of the UK Championship. He then qualified for the televised stages of the German Masters, the World Open and the China Open with 5–3 wins against Ross Muir, Andrew Norman, and Alex Borg. He reached the last 16 of the German Masters and the Welsh Open, where he lost 3–5 against Ryan Day 2–4 against Ricky Walden respectively; Hamilton lost in the first round of the World Open and the China Open 3–5 against Mark Selby and 4–5 against Neil Robertson. Hamilton played in all European Tour events this season, and reached the fourth round at four of them. This performance helped him to finish 23rd on the European Tour Order of Merit, and qualified for the Finals, where he reached the last 16, but lost 3–4 against Gerard Greene, despite leading 3–0. Hamilton's season ended when he lost 7–10 to Joe Swail in the second qualifying round of the World Championship.

=== 2014–2015 ===
Hamilton qualified for the 2014 Wuxi Classic, the first ranking event of the 2014–15 season, by beating Andrew Pagett 5–2. He defeated Kurt Maflin 5–1 in the first round, but from 4–2 ahead of Stuart Bingham in round two, he went on to lose 5–4. He failed to qualify for the Shanghai Masters and International Championship, but knocked out Craig Steadman 6–5 in the first round of the UK Championship, despite Hamilton being docked a frame for arriving late. Hamilton said afterwards, "It was rubbish – seriously. I can't play any worse. It was a good attitude but rubbish snooker. I am rubbish now a lot of the time. I am getting old basically. It's no fun but it's better than working". He reiterated these sentiments after he lost 6–4 to Graeme Dott in the second round, stating: "I don't practice much anymore. I only play because it is better than working. I will have to work for a long time so I just want to swerve it for as long as possible". Hamilton qualified for the Indian Open and China Open, but was eliminated in the first round of both. He was knocked out in the last 64 of every European Tour to finish 54th on the Order of Merit and 58th in the world rankings.

=== 2015–2016 ===
Hamilton began the 2015/2016 season at risk of losing his tour place if his performances were not good enough; despite this, good results proved hard to come by during the first half of the season – the last-32 appearance at the minor-ranking Event 5 of the European Tour was his best result. Hamilton's form improved slightly after the New Year. In the first round of the Welsh Open he eliminated the reigning world champion Stuart Bingham 4–1. having produced a break of 72 from 0–71 down to take the final frame. He defeated Allan Taylor 4–2, before losing 4–3 to Ben Woollaston in the third round. In the 2016 China Open qualifiers, Hamilton was involved in a high-quality match with Kyren Wilson, in which the two players set a record of six consecutive century breaks between them; this included two from Hamilton, but he was beaten 5–3. Hamilton finished his season by reaching the final qualifying round for the World Championship, but was edged out 10–9 by Robbie Williams for the Crucible place. Hamilton finished the year 71st in the world rankings and therefore outside of the top 64 for the first time since 1992; however, thanks to being placed 64th on the European Order of Merit (one of the eight highest-placed players not in the world top 64), he earned a fresh two-year tour card.

=== 2016–2017 ===
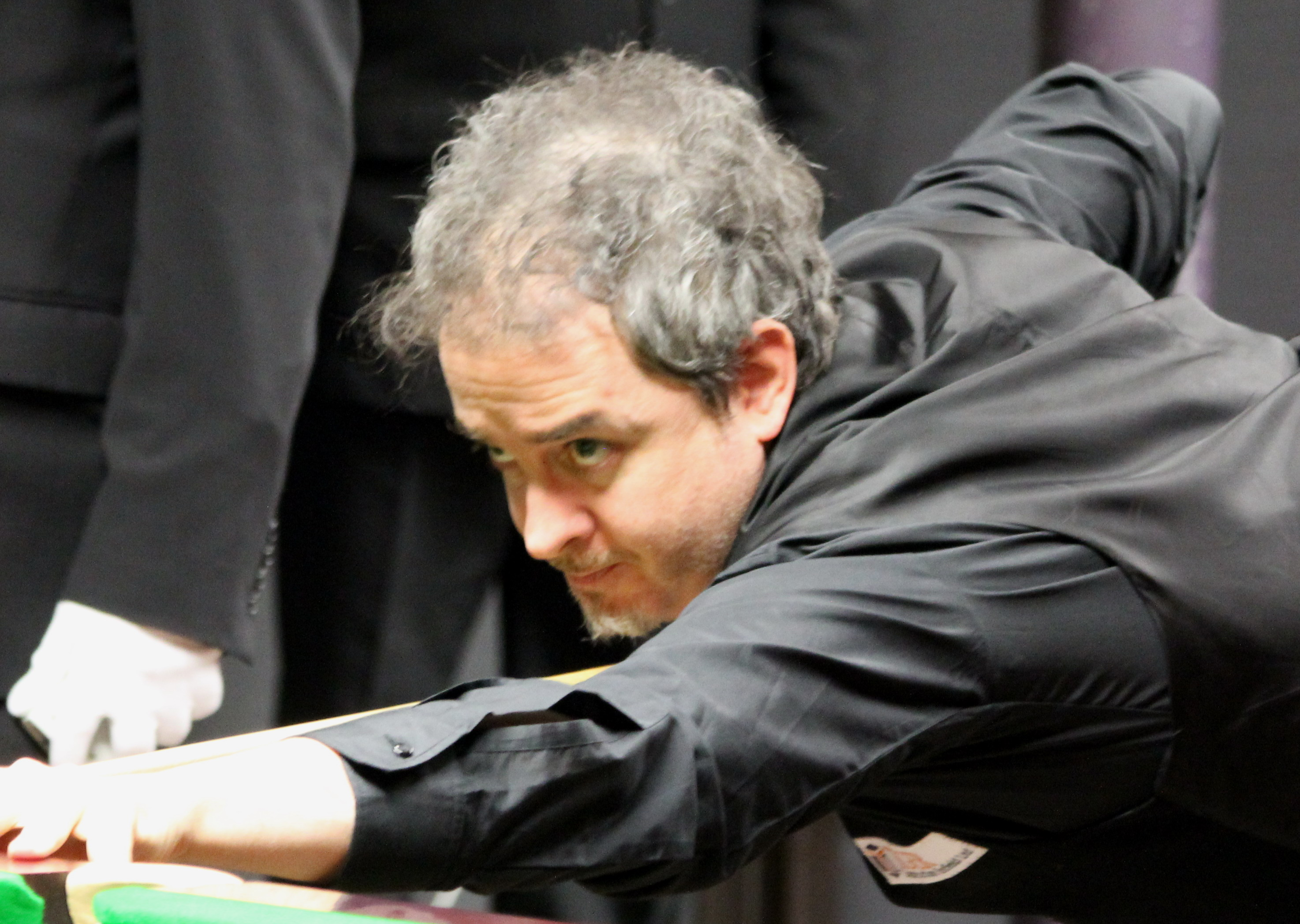
Hamilton at the 2016 Paul Hunter Classic

Hamilton reached the quarter-finals of the English Open by beating Jak Jones 4–3, but lost 5–2 to Liang Wenbo. He also reached the quarter-finals of the next Home Nations event, the Northern Ireland Open and he defeated local favourite Mark Allen 5–2 to make his first semi-final since the 2009 Welsh Open. After the match, Hamilton said "a month ago I was skint and now I'm in the semi-finals." In the semi-final he came from 4–2 and 5–3 down against Barry Hawkins to force a deciding frame in which he had a good chance to win the match, but he feathered the cue ball and Hawkins secured it with a 59 break.

Hamilton came through a very tough draw at the German Masters as he beat Mark Williams 5–3, Mark Selby 5–2 and Barry Hawkins 5–4 to advance to the semi-finals whilst claiming he wasn't playing his best. He then defeated Stuart Bingham 6–4 to get to his third ranking event final and first in 15 years in a match that finished at 1am. Playing Ali Carter in the final, Hamilton fell 2–5 down early on, but went on to win seven of the last eight frames for a 9–6 victory. It sealed the long-awaited first ranking event title of his 26-year career as a professional, and at the age of 45 he also became the oldest winner of a ranking event since 46-year-old Doug Mountjoy in 1989. Hamilton moved from 66th to 38th in the rankings. He beat Bingham 5–1, before losing 5–2 to Ding Junhui at the Players Championship and failed to reach the World Championship as he was defeated 10–9 by Noppon Saengkham in the second qualifying round. From starting the season with no ranking points he finished it 25th in the world, 31 places ahead of the next newly qualified player, Yan Bingtao.

=== 2019–2020 ===
Hamilton beat Sam Craigie 6–3 and Scott Donaldson 10–5 to qualify for the 2020 World Championship but then withdrew from the tournament. Being an asthmatic, Hamilton had criticised the decision to allow a limited number of spectators into the Crucible in the midst of the coronavirus pandemic. Defending champion Judd Trump said Hamilton should have made his decision earlier because, by participating in the qualifiers despite knowing there would be spectators in the final stages, he had denied a place to another player. This was despite government advice changing after qualifying entries had been announced.

== Personal life ==
He is nicknamed the "Sheriff of Pottingham", "Swampy" and "The Robin Hood of Snooker". He now lives in Nottingham, and regularly plays at Spot On Leisure in Hucknall, Nottingham. In 2001 he suffered a broken wrist while attempting to come to the rescue of a friend who was mugged in a nightclub, an injury that kept him out of three tournaments and ultimately cost him his place in the top 16 of the 2001/2002 season.

In 2019, an operation to improve his eyesight was unsuccessful and gave him double vision, leading Hamilton to comment: "I knew instantly my career was over after that operation".

== Performance and rankings timeline ==
Tournament	1991/ 92	1992/ 93	1993/ 94		1994/ 95	1995/ 96		1996/ 97	1997/ 98	1998/ 99	1999/ 00	2000/ 01	2001/ 02	2002/ 03	2003/ 04	2004/ 05	2005/ 06	2006/ 07	2007/ 08	2008/ 09	2009/ 10	2010/ 11	2011/ 12	2012/ 13	2013/ 14	2014/ 15	2015/ 16	2016/ 17	2017/ 18	2018/ 19	2019/ 20	2020/ 21	2021/ 22	2022/ 23	2023/ 24	2024/ 25
Ranking (Note: It shows the ranking at the beginning of the season)	(Note: New players on the Main Tour don't have a ranking)	85	49		35	31		22	14	11	10	11	19	17	20	25	17	16	36	31	33	42	36	32	43	51	58	(Note: Players qualified through European Tour Order of Merit started the season without prize money ranking points)	25	30	62	40	54	50	37	53
Ranking tournaments
Championship League	Tournament Not Held																		Non-Ranking Event													WD	RR	2R	2R	RR
Xi'an Grand Prix	Tournament Not Held																																			LQ
Saudi Arabia Masters	Tournament Not Held																																			4R
English Open	Tournament Not Held																											QF	1R	1R	2R	1R	2R	LQ	LQ	1R
British Open	LQ	2R	LQ		1R	2R		3R	2R	F	1R	WD	1R	QF	1R	QF	Tournament Not Held																3R	3R	1R	LQ
Wuhan Open	Tournament Not Held																																		1R	1R
Northern Ireland Open	Tournament Not Held																											SF	1R	1R	QF	1R	WD	WD	LQ	LQ
International Championship	Tournament Not Held																							LQ	LQ	LQ	LQ	2R	WD	LQ	LQ	Not Held			1R	WD
UK Championship	LQ	1R	2R		2R	2R		3R	3R	2R	3R	2R	2R	1R	1R	1R	1R	1R	1R	LQ	1R	LQ	LQ	LQ	1R	2R	2R	1R	1R	1R	3R	WD	4R	LQ	LQ	LQ
Shoot Out	Tournament Not Held																					Non-Ranking Event						QF	1R	1R	QF	1R	2R	1R	3R	1R
Scottish Open (Note: The event was called the International Open (1992/1993–1996/1997) and the Players Championship (2003/2004))	NH	2R	1R		1R	3R		1R	1R	2R	QF	3R	2R	2R	1R	Tournament Not Held								MR	Not Held			4R	1R	2R	1R	1R	1R	LQ	LQ	LQ
German Masters (Note: The event was called the German Open (1995/1996–1997/1998))	Tournament Not Held					LQ		1R	QF	NR	Tournament Not Held											2R	LQ	2R	2R	LQ	LQ	W	1R	LQ	LQ	LQ	LQ	LQ	LQ	LQ
Welsh Open	1R	LQ	1R		3R	2R		1R	QF	QF	1R	1R	LQ	1R	3R	3R	SF	QF	1R	SF	LQ	LQ	LQ	1R	3R	1R	3R	3R	2R	2R	3R	2R	1R	LQ	2R	LQ
World Open (Note: The event was called the Grand Prix (1991/1992–2000/2001 and 2004/2005–2009/2010) and the LG Cup (2001/2002–2003/2004))	LQ	2R	LQ		3R	2R		3R	1R	3R	QF	WD	2R	2R	1R	2R	2R	RR	RR	1R	LQ	LQ	LQ	LQ	LQ	Not Held		LQ	LQ	3R	1R	Not Held			LQ	LQ
World Grand Prix	Tournament Not Held																									NR	DNQ	1R	DNQ	DNQ	DNQ	DNQ	2R	DNQ	DNQ	DNQ
Players Championship (Note: The event was called the Players Tour Championship Grand Final (2010/2011–2015/2016))	Tournament Not Held																					2R	DNQ	DNQ	2R	DNQ	DNQ	QF	DNQ	DNQ	DNQ	DNQ	DNQ	DNQ	DNQ	DNQ
Tour Championship	Tournament Not Held																													DNQ	DNQ	DNQ	DNQ	DNQ	DNQ	DNQ
World Championship	LQ	LQ	LQ		LQ	1R		2R	2R	1R	QF	2R	QF	LQ	QF	2R	1R	QF	1R	LQ	LQ	LQ	LQ	LQ	LQ	LQ	LQ	LQ	LQ	LQ	WD	LQ	LQ	LQ	LQ	LQ
Non-ranking tournaments
Champion of Champions	Tournament Not Held																								A	A	A	A	SF	A	A	A	A	A	A	A
The Masters	LQ	LQ	LQ		LQ	LQ		LQ	QF	SF	1R	1R	LQ	LQ	LQ	A	LQ	WR	LQ	LQ	LQ	A	A	A	A	A	A	A	A	A	A	A	A	A	A	A
Championship League	Tournament Not Held																		2R	A	A	A	A	A	A	A	A	A	RR	RR	A	A	A	A	A	A
World Seniors Championship	A	Tournament Not Held																				A	A	A	A	WD	QF	A	A	NH	A	A	A	A	A	A
Former ranking tournaments
Classic	1R	Tournament Not Held																																		
Strachan Open (Note: The event was called the Strachan Challenge (1992/1993–1993/1994))	LQ	MR	NR		Tournament Not Held																															
Asian Classic (Note: The event was called the Dubai Classic (1991/1992–1994/1995) and the Thailand Classic (1995/1996))	LQ	1R	1R		LQ	1R		1R	Tournament Not Held																											
Malta Grand Prix	Not Held				Non-Ranking Event						1R	NR	Tournament Not Held																							
Thailand Masters (Note: The event was called the Asian Open (1991/1992–1992/1993) and the Thailand Open (1993/1994–1996/1997))	2R	1R	LQ		LQ	2R		2R	SF	1R	2R	2R	LQ	NR	Not Held			NR	Tournament Not Held																	
Irish Masters	Non-Ranking Event													2R	QF	1R	NH	NR	Tournament Not Held																	
Northern Ireland Trophy	Tournament Not Held																NR	2R	2R	1R	Tournament Not Held															
Bahrain Championship	Tournament Not Held																			LQ	Tournament Not Held															
Wuxi Classic (Note: The event was called the Jiangsu Classic (2008/2009–2009/2010))	Tournament Not held																			Non-Ranking Event				LQ	QF	2R	Tournament Not Held									
Australian Goldfields Open (Note: The event was called the Australian Open (1994/1995–1995/1996) and Australian Masters (1995/1996))	Not Held				Non-Ranking			Tournament Not Held															WD	WD	A	A	LQ	Tournament Not Held								
Shanghai Masters	Tournament Not Held																		LQ	1R	LQ	LQ	QF	LQ	LQ	LQ	LQ	LQ	LQ	Non-Ranking		Not Held			Non-Ranking	
Paul Hunter Classic (Note: The event was called the Grand Prix Fürth (2004/2005) and the Fürth German Open (2005/2006–2006/2007))	Tournament Not Held															Pro-am Event						Minor-Ranking Event						2R	A	A	NR	Not Held				
Indian Open	Tournament Not Held																								WD	1R	NH	2R	1R	SF	Tournament Not Held					
China Open (Note: The event was called the China International (1997/1998–1998/1999))	Tournament Not Held								NR	2R	1R	1R	F	Not Held		1R	LQ	1R	LQ	1R	LQ	LQ	LQ	LQ	1R	1R	LQ	LQ	1R	LQ	Tournament Not Held					
Riga Masters (Note: The event was called the Riga Open (2014/2015–2015/2016))	Tournament Not Held																									Minor-Rank		LQ	LQ	3R	1R	Tournament Not Held				
China Championship	Tournament Not Held																											NR	2R	1R	1R	Tournament Not Held				
WST Pro Series	Tournament Not Held																															RR	Tournament Not Held			
Turkish Masters	Tournament Not Held																																1R	Not Held		
Gibraltar Open	Tournament Not Held																										MR	3R	2R	2R	WD	4R	WD	Not Held		
WST Classic	Tournament Not Held																																	3R	Not Held	
European Masters (Note: The event was called the European Open (1991/1992–1996/1997 and 2001/2002–2003/2004), the Irish Open (1998/1999) and the Malta Cup (2004/2005–2007/2008))	LQ	LQ	1R		LQ	LQ		1R	NH	1R	Not Held		1R	LQ	2R	2R	LQ	1R	A	Tournament Not Held								LQ	WD	SF	LQ	1R	1R	2R	2R	NH
Former non-ranking tournaments
Strachan Challenge	R	MR	W	W	Tournament Not Held																															
Australian Goldfields Open	Not Held				A	W	W	Tournament Not Held															Ranking Event					Tournament Not Held								
German Masters	Tournament Not Held					Ranking Event				1R	Tournament Not Held											Ranking Event														
Scottish Masters	A	A	A		A	A		A	LQ	LQ	LQ	LQ	LQ	LQ	Tournament Not Held																					
Shoot Out	Tournament Not Held																					3R	2R	2R	1R	2R	1R	Ranking Event								
Six-red World Championship (Note: The event was called the Six-red Snooker International (2008/2009) and the Six-red World Grand Prix (2009/2010))	Tournament Not Held																			A	A	A	NH	A	A	A	A	A	A	A	A	Not Held		LQ	Not Held	

Performance Table Legend
LQ	lost in the qualifying draw	#R	lost in the early rounds of the tournament (WR = Wildcard round, RR = Round robin)	QF	lost in the quarter-finals
SF	lost in the semi-finals	F	lost in the final	W	won the tournament
DNQ	did not qualify for the tournament	A	did not participate in the tournament	WD	withdrew from the tournament
DQ	disqualified from the tournament				

NH / Not Held	event was not held.
NR / Non-Ranking Event	event is/was no longer a ranking event.
R / Ranking Event	event is/was a ranking event.
MR / Minor-Ranking Event	event is/was a minor-ranking event.

== Career finals ==
=== Ranking finals: 3 (1 title) ===
Outcome	No.	Year	Championship	Opponent in the final	Score	Ref.
Runner-up	1.	1999	British Open	(Republic of Ireland) Fergal O'Brien	7–9	
Runner-up	2.	2002	China Open	(Wales) Mark Williams	8–9	
Winner	1.	2017	German Masters	(England) Ali Carter	9–6	

=== Minor-ranking finals: 1 ===
Outcome	No.	Year	Championship	Opponent in the final	Score	Ref.
Runner-up	1.	2010	Paul Hunter Classic	(England) Judd Trump	3–4	

=== Non-ranking finals: 4 (4 titles) ===
Outcome	No.	Year	Championship	Opponent in the final	Score	Ref.
Winner	1.	1994	Strachan Challenge – Event 1	(England) Andy Hicks	9–4	
Winner	2.	1994	Strachan Challenge – Event 2	(Wales) Paul Davies	9–4	
Winner	3.	1995	Australian Masters	(Scotland) Chris Small	8–6	
Winner	4.	1995	Australian Open	(Scotland) Chris Small	9–7	

=== Pro-am finals: 1 (1 title) ===
Outcome	No.	Year	Championship	Opponent in the final	Score	Ref.
Winner	1.	1990	Pontins Autumn Open	(Northern Ireland) Joe Swail	5–1	
