= Chris Small =

Scottish snooker player

Personal information
- Born: 26 September 1973 (age 53)

Sport
- Country: Scotland
- Sport: Snooker
- Professional: 1991–2005
- Highest ranking: 12 (2004/05)

Tournament wins
- Ranking: 1
- Minor-ranking: 1

Christopher Small (born 26 September 1973) is a retired Scottish professional snooker player and now a qualified snooker coach. His playing career was ended by the spinal condition ankylosing spondylitis.

== Career ==
At age 15, Small was the number 1 under-19 player in Scotland. He turned professional the following year. In 1992, he won the Benson & Hedges Championship, defeating Alan McManus in the final, and in 1995 he reached the Semi-finals of the Welsh Open, and was again a semi-finalist at the 1998 Grand Prix event. His greatest achievement was winning the 2002 LG Cup, beating Ronnie O'Sullivan and John Higgins, before a 9–5 win over Alan McManus in the final. This followed a season in which he won only three matches, owing to the severity of his medical condition. He reached the quarter-finals of the LG Cup in the following season.

The 2003/2004 season ended with him having to pull out of a World Championship match against Alan McManus while trailing 1–7, as the regular steroid injections he required in his neck caused problems with his vision. The 2004–05 season was disastrous for him, as he lost all his ranking tournament matches, and in September 2005 he announced his retirement from the game. Small then started coaching other players, but by 2009 his condition had worsened, and he had to give up coaching.

Despite being the youngest player ever to win on his Crucible debut (10–7 against Doug Mountjoy aged 18 in 1992), he never progressed beyond the last-16 in the World Championship. He was a regular in the top 32 for several years, but his LG Cup win helped him reach #12 for the 2004–05 season, the only time he had entered the top 16. His career-high break was a 141.

He applied for a grant from a trust fund for players who have fallen on hard times from the World Professional Billiards and Snooker Association, but was rejected. This decision, stemming from Small's refusal to provide a £250 medical certificate, has been criticised by figures including Jimmy White, Graeme Dott ("Everybody in the game that I've spoken to is behind him") and Clive Everton.

In 2012, improved medication allowed Small to return to coaching, one of his players being former snooker professional Michael Leslie.

== Personal life ==
Small is the son of a taxi driver. He worked as a bank clerk before his success in snooker. Small and his wife Clare have four children.

== Performance and rankings timeline ==
Tournament	1991/ 92	1992/ 93	1993/ 94	1994/ 95	1995/ 96	1996/ 97	1997/ 98	1998/ 99	1999/ 00	2000/ 01	2001/ 02	2002/ 03	2003/ 04	2004/ 05
Ranking (Note: From the 2010/2011 season it shows the ranking at the beginning of the season.)	(Note: New players on the Main Tour don't have a ranking.)	75	98	86	62	30	25	25	18	21	24	29	18	12
Ranking tournaments
Grand Prix (Note: The event also ran under the name LG Cup (2001/2002–2003/2004))	LQ	LQ	LQ	1R	LQ	2R	QF	SF	3R	1R	1R	W	QF	1R
UK Championship	LQ	1R	LQ	1R	3R	2R	2R	1R	2R	2R	2R	3R	2R	2R
Malta Cup (Note: The event also ran as the European Open (1991/1992–1996/1997 and 2001/2002–2003/2004) and Irish Open (1998/1999))	A	LQ	1R	LQ	LQ	2R	NH	LQ	Not Held		LQ	LQ	2R	1R
Welsh Open	LQ	LQ	LQ	SF	3R	2R	3R	2R	2R	1R	1R	LQ	2R	2R
China Open (Note: The event ran under a different name as China International (1997/1998–1998/1999))	Tournament Not Held						NR	1R	LQ	LQ	LQ	Not Held		1R
World Championship	2R	LQ	LQ	LQ	LQ	LQ	LQ	2R	1R	2R	1R	1R	1R	1R
Non-ranking tournaments
The Masters	LQ	WR	LQ	LQ	LQ	LQ	A	A	A	A	A	A	A	1R
Former ranking tournaments
Classic	LQ	Tournament Not Held												
Strachan Open	LQ	Tournament Not Held												
Dubai Classic (Note: The event also ran under the names Thailand Classic (1995/1996) and Asian Classic (1996/1997))	A	LQ	LQ	LQ	LQ	LQ	Tournament Not Held							
German Open	Tournament Not Held				1R	LQ	1R	NR	Tournament Not Held					
Malta Grand Prix	Not Held		Non-Ranking Event					LQ	NR	Tournament Not Held				
Thailand Masters (Note: The event also ran under the names Asian Open (1992/1993) and Thailand Open (1993/1994–1996/1997))	A	LQ	LQ	LQ	LQ	LQ	1R	LQ	1R	1R	LQ	NR	Not Held	
Scottish Open (Note: The event also ran under the names International Open (1991/1992–1996/1997) and Players Championship (2003/2004))	A	LQ	LQ	LQ	3R	2R	1R	3R	2R	2R	1R	1R	1R	NH
British Open	LQ	1R	1R	2R	LQ	1R	2R	3R	2R	1R	1R	SF	1R	2R
Irish Masters	Non-Ranking Event											QF	SF	LQ
Former non-ranking tournaments
Australian Masters	Not Held			A	F	Tournament Not Held								
Scottish Masters	A	1R	A	A	A	A	A	LQ	LQ	LQ	A	LQ	Not Held	

NH / Not Held	event was not held.
NR / Non-Ranking Event	event is/was no longer a ranking event.
R / Ranking Event	event is/was a ranking event.
MR / Minor-Ranking Event	event is/was a minor-ranking event.

== Career finals ==
=== Ranking finals: 1 (1 title) ===
Outcome	No.	Year	Championship	Opponent in the final	Score
Winner	1.	2002	LG Cup	(Scotland) Alan McManus	9–5

=== Minor-ranking finals: 1 (1 title) ===
Outcome	No.	Year	Championship	Opponent in the final	Score
Winner	1.	1992	Benson & Hedges Championship	(Scotland) Alan McManus	9–1

=== Non-ranking finals: 2 ===
Outcome	No.	Year	Championship	Opponent in the final	Score
Runner-up	1.	1995	Australian Masters	(England) Anthony Hamilton	6–8
Runner-up	2.	1995	Australian Open	(England) Anthony Hamilton	7–9

=== Team finals: 1 ===
Outcome	No.	Year	Championship	Team/partner	Opponent(s) in the final	Score
Runner-up	1.	1999	Nations Cup	Scotland	Wales	4–6
