= 1995 Australian Masters =

Australian Masters
Tournament information
- Dates: 14–16 September 1995
- Venue: Bentleigh Club
- City: Melbourne
- Country: Australia
- Organisation: WPBSA
- Format: Non-ranking event
- Winner's share: £4,000

Final
- Champion: (England) Anthony Hamilton
- Runner-up: (Scotland) Chris Small
- Score: 8–6

The 1995 Australian Masters was a professional non-ranking snooker tournament that took place between 14 and 16 September 1995 at the Bentleigh Club in Melbourne, Australia.

Anthony Hamilton won the tournament by defeating Chris Small 8–6 in the final.

== Main draw ==
Round 1 Best of 9 Frames
(England) Anthony Hamilton	5
(Australia) Johl Younger	1
(Thailand) Phaitoon Phonbun	5
(Australia) Eddie Charlton	1
(Republic of Ireland) Michael Judge	5
(Australia) Stuart Lawler	4
(New Zealand) Chris McBreen	5
(Thailand) Anurat Wongjan	2
(Scotland) Chris Small	5
(Australia) Andrew Hicks	0
(Belgium) Yvan van Velthoven	5
(Australia) Warren King	3
(Wales) Tony Chappel	5
(Australia) Les Higgins	1
(Malaysia) Yong Kien Foot	5
(Australia) Stan Gorski	2

Quarter-finals; Best of 9 Frames
(England) Anthony Hamilton	5
(Thailand) Phaitoon Phonbun	1
(Republic of Ireland) Michael Judge	5
(New Zealand) Chris McBreen	1
(Scotland) Chris Small	5
(Belgium) Yvan van Velthoven	2
(Wales) Tony Chappel	5
(Malaysia) Yong Kien Foot	4

Semi-finals; Best of 11 Frames
(England) Anthony Hamilton	6
(Republic of Ireland) Michael Judge	0
(Scotland) Chris Small	6
(Wales) Tony Chappel	0

Final; Best of 15 Frames
(England) Anthony Hamilton	8
(Scotland) Chris Small	6
