= 1999–2000 snooker season =

Details
- Duration: 23 July 1999 – 28 May 2000
- Tournaments: 23 (9 ranking events)

Triple Crown winners
- UK Championship: (Wales) Mark Williams
- Masters: (Wales) Matthew Stevens
- World Championship: (Wales) Mark Williams

The 1999–2000 snooker season was a series of snooker tournaments played between 23 July 1999 and 28 May 2000. The following table outlines the results for ranking events and the invitational events.

== Calendar ==
=== World Snooker Tour ===
Start	Finish	Country	Tournament name	Venue	City	Winner	Runner-up	Score	Ref.
23 Jul	25 Jul	HKG	Millennium Cup	Regent Hotel	Hong Kong	(England) Stephen Lee	(England) Ronnie O'Sullivan	7–2	
28 Aug	5 Sep	ENG	Champions Cup	Fairfield Halls	Croydon	(Scotland) Stephen Hendry	(Wales) Mark Williams	7–5	
8 Sep	19 Sep	ENG	British Open	Plymouth Pavilions	Plymouth	(Scotland) Stephen Hendry	(England) Peter Ebdon	9–5	
28 Sep	3 Oct	SCO	Scottish Masters	Civic Centre	Motherwell	(Wales) Matthew Stevens	(Scotland) John Higgins	9–7	
11 Oct	24 Oct	ENG	Grand Prix	Guild Hall	Preston	(Scotland) John Higgins	(Wales) Mark Williams	9–8	
5 Nov	16 Nov	ENG	Benson & Hedges Championship	Willie Thorne Snooker Centre	Malvern	(England) Ali Carter	(England) Simon Bedford	9–4	
13 Nov	28 Nov	ENG	UK Championship	Bournemouth International Centre	Bournemouth	(Wales) Mark Williams	(Wales) Matthew Stevens	10–8	
11 Dec	19 Dec	CHN	China Open	JC Mandarin Hotel	Shanghai	(England) Ronnie O'Sullivan	(England) Stephen Lee	9–2	
15 Jan	23 Jan	ENG	Nations Cup	The Hexagon	Reading	England	Wales	6–4	
24 Jan	30 Jan	WAL	Welsh Open	Cardiff International Arena	Cardiff	(Scotland) John Higgins	(England) Stephen Lee	9–8	
6 Feb	13 Feb	ENG	The Masters	Wembley Conference Centre	London	(Wales) Matthew Stevens	(Republic of Ireland) Ken Doherty	10–8	
20 Feb	27 Feb	MLT	Malta Grand Prix	Mediterranean Conference Centre	Valletta	(Republic of Ireland) Ken Doherty	(Wales) Mark Williams	9–3	
3 Mar	11 Mar	THA	Thailand Masters	Riverside Montien Hotel	Bangkok	(Wales) Mark Williams	(Scotland) Stephen Hendry	9–5	
21 Mar	26 Mar	IRL	Irish Masters	Goff's	Kill	(Scotland) John Higgins	(Scotland) Stephen Hendry	9–4	
28 Mar	9 Apr	SCO	Scottish Open	A.E.C.C.	Aberdeen	(England) Ronnie O'Sullivan	(Wales) Mark Williams	9–1	
15 Apr	1 May	ENG	World Snooker Championship	Crucible Theatre	Sheffield	(Wales) Mark Williams	(Wales) Matthew Stevens	18–16	
8 Jan	6 May	ENG	Premier League	Charter Hall	Colchester	(Scotland) Stephen Hendry	(Wales) Mark Williams	9–5	
13 May	20 May	WAL	Pontins Professional	Pontins	Prestatyn	(Wales) Darren Morgan	(England) Jimmy White	9–2	

Ranking event
Non-ranking event

=== UK Tour ===
Start	Finish	Country	Tournament name	Venue	City	Winner	Runner-up	Score	Ref.
5 Oct	10 Oct	ENG	UK Tour 1	Riley's	Oldham	(England) Matt Wilson	(England) Barry Hawkins	6–4	
23 Jan	25 Jan	ENG	UK Tour 2	Jesters Snooker Club	Swindon	(England) Andrew Higginson	(Scotland) Scott MacKenzie	6–3	
16 Mar	18 Mar	ENG	UK Tour 3	Riley's	Stockport	(England) Simon Bedford	(England) Barry Hawkins	6–5	
10 Apr	12 Apr	ENG	UK Tour 4	Jesters Snooker Club	Swindon	(England) Barry Hawkins	(England) Craig Butler	6–1	

=== Seniors event ===
Start	Finish	Country	Tournament name	Venue	City	Winner	Runner-up	Score	Ref.
27 May	28 May	ENG	World Seniors Masters	Royal Automobile Club	London	(England) Willie Thorne	(Canada) Cliff Thorburn	1–0	

== Official rankings ==
The top 16 of the world rankings, these players automatically played in the final rounds of the world ranking events and were invited for the Masters.

No.	Ch.	Player	Points 1997/1998	Points 1998/1999	Total
1	Steady	(Scotland) John Higgins	27835	22755	50590
2	Steady	(Scotland) Stephen Hendry	16790	24445	41235
3	▲	(Wales) Mark Williams	11335	25445	36780
4	▼	(England) Ronnie O'Sullivan	21105	12440	33545
5	▲	(England) John Parrott	15335	14665	30000
6	▲	(England) Stephen Lee	12880	15625	28505
7	▼	(Republic of Ireland) Ken Doherty	15095	12995	28090
8	Steady	(Scotland) Alan McManus	10755	15760	26515
9	▲	(Wales) Matthew Stevens	10280	13100	23380
10	▲	(England) Anthony Hamilton	10760	12255	23015
11	▲	(Republic of Ireland) Fergal O'Brien	9095	13667	22762
12	▲	(England) Paul Hunter	9715	12422	22137
13	▼	(England) Peter Ebdon	10340	11470	21810
14	▲	(England) Mark King	10950	9470	20420
15	▼	(England) Steve Davis	9175	10870	20045
16	▲	(England) Jimmy White	10810	9012	19822
