= 2011–12 snooker world rankings =

Preceded by 2010–11	2011–12	Succeeded by 2012–13

2011–12 snooker world rankings: The professional world rankings for all the professional snooker players who qualified for the 2011‍–‍12 season are listed below. The rankings work as a two-year rolling list. The points for each tournament two years ago are removed, when the corresponding tournament during the current season has finished. The following table contains the rankings, which were used to determine the seedings for certain tournaments.

Name	Country	Revision 1^{[a]}		Revision 2^{[b]}		Revision 3^{[c]}		Revision 4^{[d]}	
Mark Selby	England	3	55965	1	67385	1	69945	1	73945
Mark Williams	Wales	1	60360	2	63540	2	65020	2	66920
Judd Trump	England	9	41715	8	46465	5	57385	3	60985
Shaun Murphy	England	7	46965	6	50485	6	54085	4	59785
Neil Robertson	Australia	5	48100	4	52100	4	57940	5	58640
John Higgins	Scotland	2	58820	3	57540	3	58180	6	56980
Ding Junhui	China	4	55960	5	51420	9	48740	7	53740
Stephen Maguire	Scotland	8	45300	9	45980	8	49260	8	52960
Graeme Dott	Scotland	10	40930	10	44405	7	50005	9	50705
Mark Allen	Northern Ireland	12	37305	12	39625	10	48265	10	50165
Martin Gould	England	21	32950	16	37210	12	45370	11	47520
Stephen Lee	England	18	34420	13	38750	15	40550	12	45675
Ali Carter	England	6	47040	7	46760	11	48200	13	45600
Ronnie O'Sullivan	England	11	40660	14	38660	16	40540	14	45540
Matthew Stevens	Wales	14	36395	15	37815	13	43015	15	45515
Stuart Bingham	England	17	35275	11	40955	14	41115	16	43515
Mark Davis	England	19	33630	17	36860	17	40300	17	41700
Ricky Walden	England	20	33450	22	32810	18	39730	18	41630
Stephen Hendry	Scotland	16	35420	21	34260	20	37140	19	37715
Andrew Higginson	England	25	29420	20	34590	19	37470	20	37545
Marco Fu	Hong Kong	23	31120	29	29405	24	34885	21	36160
Barry Hawkins	England	22	31125	23	32680	23	35240	22	36140
Jamie Cope	England	15	35580	18	35100	21	36820	23	36070
Marcus Campbell	Scotland	24	30215	24	32280	22	35480	24	36055
Joe Perry	England	27	28750	27	29915	26	33435	25	35210
Peter Ebdon	England	13	36480	19	34600	29	32840	26	34940
Tom Ford	England	34	25105	31	28940	27	32980	27	34880
Dominic Dale	Wales	31	27715	26	30235	25	34075	28	33825
Ryan Day	Wales	28	28185	30	29185	28	32905	29	32380
Fergal O'Brien	Ireland	37	23145	28	29505	31	31705	30	32280
Mark King	England	26	29210	25	31685	30	31765	31	31840
Ken Doherty	Ireland	29	28060	32	28145	33	29865	32	31515
Rory McLeod	England	35	25005	33	27635	32	30235	33	30560
Michael Holt	England	45	20950	38	24875	35	28275	34	29425
Anthony Hamilton	England	36	23900	34	27090	34	28530	35	28980
Gerard Greene	Northern Ireland	32	26430	37	25330	36	27530	36	28430
Steve Davis	England	44	21085	43	23425	43	25665	37	27890
Robert Milkins	England	33	25660	36	25575	38	26895	38	27595
Liang Wenbo	China	30	27950	35	26090	42	25850	39	27575
Nigel Bond	England	40	21675	44	23315	37	26995	40	27195
Jamie Burnett	Scotland	39	21770	42	23440	44	25480	41	27080
Jamie Jones	Wales	47	20315	45	23035	41	26155	42	26915
Matthew Selt	England	43	21195	40	24025	40	26265	43	26840
Mike Dunn	England	38	22570	41	23750	48	24470	44	26570
Jack Lisowski	England	52	19635	39	24175	39	26335	45	26270
Alan McManus	Scotland	51	19780	46	22585	46	25265	46	25465
Joe Jogia	England	49	19825	48	22080	45	25280	47	25405
Jimmy White	England	55	18395	54	20880	47	24520	48	25220
Xiao Guodong	China	64	16650	52	21000	50	24200	49	25100
Mark Joyce	England	42	21285	50	21770	51	23410	50	24810
Ben Woollaston	England	69	15575	55	20685	52	23405	51	24430
Dave Harold	England	48	20285	47	22235	49	24315	52	24390
Jimmy Robertson	England	53	18770	57	20075	53	23195	53	23770
Anthony McGill	Scotland	59	17670	56	20495	56	22375	54	23585
Michael White	Wales	66	16150	65	18040	57	21360	55	22635
Barry Pinches	England	41	21520	49	21775	55	22495	56	21995
Tony Drago	Malta	46	20940	51	21180	54	22620	57	21870
James Wattana	Thailand	67	15935	58	20025	58	20585	58	21660
Peter Lines	England	50	19815	53	20930	59	20450	59	21600
Andy Hicks	England	61	17095	64	18245	63	19365	60	21015
Liu Chuang	China	60	17290	59	19035	60	19715	61	20925
Adrian Gunnell	England	56	18390	61	18400	62	19520	62	20795
Liu Song	China	62	17030	62	18330	61	19610	63	19935
Alfie Burden	England	57	18240	60	18620	67	18660	64	19620
Joe Swail	Northern Ireland	54	18405	63	18260	68	18420	65	19395
David Gilbert	England	74	14495	73	15715	65	19035	66	19360
Ian McCulloch	England	63	16895	67	17010	66	19010	67	19335
Rod Lawler	England	58	17680	66	17445	69	18325	68	19225
Yu Delu	China			72	15745	73	17465	69	19175
Li Yan	China			70	16095	64	19175	70	18985
Adam Duffy	England			77	15125	74	17365	71	18575
Liam Highfield	England	68	15645	68	16915	70	18195	72	18330
Kurt Maflin	Norway			78	15115	72	17555	73	18190
David Morris	Ireland			80	14980	76	16820	74	17470
Andrew Norman	England	87	10715	74	15645	75	17325	75	17460
Passakorn Suwannawat	Thailand			69	16135	71	17615	76	17300
Sam Craigie	England			83	14505	79	16185	77	16695
Sam Baird	England	82	13035	88	13895	81	15735	78	16620
Andrew Pagett	Wales	71	15300	71	15830	78	16230	79	16490
Tian Pengfei	China			81	14825	77	16705	80	16390
David Grace	England			89	13715	80	15795	81	16055
Paul Davison	England	72	14835	79	15005	86	15205	82	15965
Cao Yupeng	China			86	14065	84	15385	83	15770
Adam Wicheard	England			93	13155	91	14075	84	15535
Matthew Couch	England	70	15460	76	15550	87	15190	85	15315
Dechawat Poomjaeng	Thailand			87	14005	82	15685	86	15170
Aditya Mehta	India			84	14415	85	15255	87	14940
Bjorn Haneveer	Belgium	65	16625	75	15565	83	15565	88	14665
Simon Bedford	England			85	14225	90	14425	89	14550
Luca Brecel	Belgium			91	13445	88	14765	90	14450
Scott MacKenzie	Scotland			82	14595	89	14635	91	14120
David Hogan	Ireland			90	13515	93	13355	92	12840
Robin Hull	Finland			92	13245	92	13445	93	12605
Stuart Carrington	England			94	12525	94	12005	94	12265
Daniel Wells	Wales			97	12165	97	11645	95	11780
Lucky Vatnani	India			100	11685	98	11165	96	11550
Kacper Filipiak	Poland			95	12165	95	11645	97	11130
Joe Meara	Northern Ireland			96	12165	96	11645	98	11130
Igor Figueiredo	Brazil	75	13365	99	11685	99	10845	100	10005

== Notes ==
- ^{a} Revision 1 was used for the seeding of the Australian Goldfields Open and Shanghai Masters.
- ^{b} Revision 2 was used for the seeding of the UK Championship, German Masters, Masters and Snooker Shoot-Out.
- ^{c} Revision 3 was used for the seeding of the Welsh Open, World Open and China Open.
- ^{d} Revision 4 was used for the seeding of the World Championship.
