= Euro Players Tour Championship 2010/2011 – Event 4 =

Euro Players Tour Championship 2010/2011 Event 4

Tournament information
- Dates: 28–31 October 2010
- Venue: South West Snooker Academy
- City: Gloucester
- Country: England
- Organisation: World Snooker
- Format: Minor-ranking event
- Total prize fund: €50,000
- Winner's share: €10,000
- Highest break: Stephen Maguire (SCO) (136)

Final
- Champion: Stephen Lee (ENG)
- Runner-up: Stephen Maguire (SCO)
- Score: 4–2

The Euro Players Tour Championship 2010/2011 – Event 4 (also known as the 2010 MIUS Cup) was a professional minor-ranking snooker tournament that took place between 28 and 31 October 2010 at the South West Snooker Academy in Gloucester, England.

The event was planned to be staged at the Ortenau Halle in Offenburg, Germany and would have been known as the 2010 Ortenau Cup. Due to poor ticket sales and the top players competing in the new cue sports tournament Power Snooker it was moved to Gloucester, England.

Stephen Lee won the final 4–2 against Stephen Maguire.

== Prize fund and ranking points ==
The breakdown of prize money and ranking points of the event is shown below:

	Prize fund	Ranking points^{1}
Winner	€10,000	2,000
Runner-up	€5,000	1,600
Semi-finalist	€2,500	1,280
Quarter-finalist	€1,400	1,000
Last 16	€1,000	760
Last 32	€500	560
Last 64	€200	360
Plate winner^{2}	€1,500	–
Plate runner-up^{2}	€500	–
Total	€50,000	–

- ^{1} Only professional players can earn ranking points.
- ^{2} Prize money earned from the Plate competition does not qualify for inclusion in the Order of Merit.

== Main draw ==
=== Preliminary round ===
Best of 7 frames

(Belgium) Luca Brecel	0–4	(England) Stuart Carrington
(England) Martin O'Donnell	4–1	(India) David Singh
(England) Andrew Milliard	w/o–w/d	(Wales) Jamie Clarke

=== Main rounds ===
==== Top half ====
===== Section 1 =====
Last 128; Best of 7 frames
(England) Barry Pinches	1
(England) David Grace	4
(China) Liang Wenbo	w/o
(England) Danny Douane	w/d
(Northern Ireland) Mark Allen	w/o
(England) Mike Dunn	w/d
(China) Ding Junhui	3
(England) Andrew Norman	4
(China) Liu Song	4
(England) Sam Baird	3
(Australia) Neil Robertson	4
(Republic of Ireland) David Morris	1
(England) Jimmy White	4
(Wales) Duane Jones	1
(England) Stephen Lee	4
(Australia) Jamie Brown	2

Last 64; Best of 7 frames
(England) David Grace	4
(China) Liang Wenbo	2
(Northern Ireland) Mark Allen	3
(England) Andrew Norman	4
(China) Liu Song	4
(Australia) Neil Robertson	2
(England) Jimmy White	3
(England) Stephen Lee	4

Last 32; Best of 7 frames
(England) David Grace	2
(England) Andrew Norman	4
(China) Liu Song	2
(England) Stephen Lee	4

Last 16; Best of 7 frames
(England) Andrew Norman	3
(England) Stephen Lee	4

===== Section 2 =====
Last 128; Best of 7 frames
(England) Adrian Gunnell	w/d
(England) Stuart Carrington	w/o
(Northern Ireland) Patrick Wallace	0
(England) Mark King	4
(England) Jimmy Robertson	4
(Wales) Jak Jones	1
(England) Peter Ebdon	4
(Republic of Ireland) Joe Delaney	0
(England) Mark Davis	4
(Germany) Patrick Einsle	0
(England) Ricky Walden	4
(England) Jamie Walker	0
(Wales) Jamie Jones	4
(England) Ian Glover	2
(England) Ali Carter	4
(England) Reanne Evans	0

Last 64; Best of 7 frames
(England) Stuart Carrington	4
(England) Mark King	3
(England) Jimmy Robertson	3
(England) Peter Ebdon	4
(England) Mark Davis	4
(England) Ricky Walden	1
(Wales) Jamie Jones	4
(England) Ali Carter	1

Last 32; Best of 7 frames
(England) Stuart Carrington	0
(England) Peter Ebdon	4
(England) Mark Davis	4
(Wales) Jamie Jones	2

Last 16; Best of 7 frames
(England) Peter Ebdon	1
(England) Mark Davis	4

===== Section 3 =====
Last 128; Best of 7 frames
(Scotland) James McBain	4
(England) Chris Norbury	1
(England) Andy Hicks	4
(Wales) Michael White	2
(China) Xiao Guodong	4
(Thailand) James Wattana	0
(England) Joe Jogia	4
(England) Marc Harman	1
(England) Paul Davison	4
(England) Adam Wicheard	0
(Wales) Matthew Stevens	4
(England) Martin O'Donnell	1
(Wales) Daniel Wells	4
(Northern Ireland) Dermot McGlinchey	0
(Belgium) Bjorn Haneveer	1
(Republic of Ireland) Ken Doherty	4

Last 64; Best of 7 frames
(Scotland) James McBain	0
(England) Andy Hicks	4
(China) Xiao Guodong	3
(England) Joe Jogia	4
(England) Paul Davison	1
(Wales) Matthew Stevens	4
(Wales) Daniel Wells	3
(Republic of Ireland) Ken Doherty	4

Last 32; Best of 7 frames
(England) Andy Hicks	0
(England) Joe Jogia	4
(Wales) Matthew Stevens	2
(Republic of Ireland) Ken Doherty	4

Last 16; Best of 7 frames
(England) Joe Jogia	4
(Republic of Ireland) Ken Doherty	2

===== Section 4 =====
Last 128; Best of 7 frames
(Scotland) Marcus Campbell	3
(Thailand) Thanawat Thirapongpaiboon	4
(England) Judd Trump	4
(England) Les Dodd	1
(Brazil) Igor Figueiredo	4
(England) Robbie Williams	1
(England) Shaun Murphy	4
(Scotland) Gary Thomson	0
(England) Andrew Higginson	4
(Wales) Alex Taubman	0
(China) Liu Chuang	4
(Northern Ireland) Joe Swail	0
(Wales) Dominic Dale	2
(Wales) Ryan Day	4
(England) Barry Hawkins	4
(England) Justin Astley	1

Last 64; Best of 7 frames
(Thailand) Thanawat Thirapongpaiboon	1
(England) Judd Trump	4
(Brazil) Igor Figueiredo	1
(England) Shaun Murphy	4
(England) Andrew Higginson	2
(China) Liu Chuang	4
(Wales) Ryan Day	4
(England) Barry Hawkins	0

Last 32; Best of 7 frames
(England) Judd Trump	0
(England) Shaun Murphy	4
(China) Liu Chuang	4
(Wales) Ryan Day	2

Last 16; Best of 7 frames
(England) Shaun Murphy	1
(China) Liu Chuang	4

==== Bottom half ====
===== Section 5 =====
Last 128; Best of 7 frames
(Wales) Mark Williams	w/d
(England) Michael Holt	w/o
(Scotland) Anthony McGill	4
(Belgium) Hans Blanckaert	1
(Republic of Ireland) Fergal O'Brien	4
(England) Kuldesh Johal	2
(England) Liam Highfield	4
(England) Christopher Henry	0
(Scotland) Alan McManus	2
(Thailand) Issara Kachaiwong	4
(England) Michael Wasley	4
(England) Pascal Richard	0
(England) Rory McLeod	4
(England) Ben Harrison	0
(Northern Ireland) Gerard Greene	w/o
(Germany) Stefan Gerst	w/d

Last 64; Best of 7 frames
(England) Michael Holt	1
(Scotland) Anthony McGill	4
(Republic of Ireland) Fergal O'Brien	2
(England) Liam Highfield	4
(Thailand) Issara Kachaiwong	2
(England) Michael Wasley	4
(England) Rory McLeod	3
(Northern Ireland) Gerard Greene	4

Last 32; Best of 7 frames
(Scotland) Anthony McGill	3
(England) Liam Highfield	4
(England) Michael Wasley	1
(Northern Ireland) Gerard Greene	4

Last 16; Best of 7 frames
(England) Liam Highfield	4
(Northern Ireland) Gerard Greene	2

===== Section 6 =====
Last 128; Best of 7 frames
(Malta) Tony Drago	4
(England) Mitchell Mann	0
(England) Matthew Couch	4
(England) Del Smith	0
(England) Dave Harold	w/d
(Republic of Ireland) Leo Fernandez	w/o
(England) Ben Woollaston	4
(China) Zhang Anda	1
(England) Peter Lines	1
(Scotland) Jamie Burnett	4
(Scotland) Graeme Dott	4
(England) Jamie O'Neill	1
(England) Martin Gould	4
(England) Lewis John Calcutt	0
(England) Tom Ford	4
(England) Andrew Milliard	3

Last 64; Best of 7 frames
(Malta) Tony Drago	2
(England) Matthew Couch	4
(Republic of Ireland) Leo Fernandez	3
(England) Ben Woollaston	4
(Scotland) Jamie Burnett	2
(Scotland) Graeme Dott	4
(England) Martin Gould	2
(England) Tom Ford	4

Last 32; Best of 7 frames
(England) Matthew Couch	2
(England) Ben Woollaston	4
(Scotland) Graeme Dott	4
(England) Tom Ford	0

Last 16; Best of 7 frames
(England) Ben Woollaston	3
(Scotland) Graeme Dott	4

===== Section 7 =====
Last 128; Best of 7 frames
(England) Jack Lisowski	4
(England) Simon Bedford	1
(England) Jamie Cope	0
(England) David Gilbert	4
(England) Ian McCulloch	4
(England) Jeff Cundy	3
(England) Mark Joyce	4
(China) Chen Zhe	2
(Scotland) Stephen Maguire	4
(England) Tony Knowles	2
(Hong Kong) Marco Fu	4
(England) Robert Milkins	1
(Wales) Andrew Pagett	4
(Germany) Lasse Münstermann	1
(England) Joe Perry	4
(Scotland) Stephen Hendry	3

Last 64; Best of 7 frames
(England) Jack Lisowski	4
(England) David Gilbert	1
(England) Ian McCulloch	1
(England) Mark Joyce	4
(Scotland) Stephen Maguire	4
(Hong Kong) Marco Fu	3
(Wales) Andrew Pagett	1
(England) Joe Perry	4

Last 32; Best of 7 frames
(England) Jack Lisowski	4
(England) Mark Joyce	2
(Scotland) Stephen Maguire	4
(England) Joe Perry	2

Last 16; Best of 7 frames
(England) Jack Lisowski	2
(Scotland) Stephen Maguire	4

===== Section 8 =====
Last 128; Best of 7 frames
(England) Nigel Bond	4
(England) Rod Lawler	3
(England) Stuart Bingham	4
(England) Jack Culligan	0
(England) Allan Taylor	4
(England) Andy Lee	1
(England) Anthony Hamilton	4
(Wales) Kishan Hirani	1
(England) Alfie Burden	0
(England) Steve Davis	4
(England) Matthew Selt	4
(Norway) Kurt Maflin	0
(England) Ronnie O'Sullivan	n/s
(Thailand) Noppon Saengkham	w/o
(England) Mark Selby	4
(England) Kyren Wilson	2

Last 64; Best of 7 frames
(England) Nigel Bond	2
(England) Stuart Bingham	4
(England) Allan Taylor	2
(England) Anthony Hamilton	4
(England) Steve Davis	3
(England) Matthew Selt	4
(Thailand) Noppon Saengkham	1
(England) Mark Selby	4

Last 32; Best of 7 frames
(England) Stuart Bingham	2
(England) Anthony Hamilton	4
(England) Matthew Selt	2
(England) Mark Selby	4

Last 16; Best of 7 frames
(England) Anthony Hamilton	4
(England) Mark Selby	2

==== Finals ====
Quarter-finals; Best of 7 frames		Semi-finals; Best of 7 frames		Final; Best of 7 frames
(England) Stephen Lee	4
(England) Mark Davis	2	(England) Stephen Lee	4
(England) Joe Jogia	4	(England) Joe Jogia	1
(China) Liu Chuang	2			(England) Stephen Lee	4
(England) Liam Highfield	4			(Scotland) Stephen Maguire	2
(Scotland) Graeme Dott	3	(England) Liam Highfield	2
(Scotland) Stephen Maguire	4	(Scotland) Stephen Maguire	4
(England) Anthony Hamilton	2

== Plate draw ==
Plate quarter-finals Best of 5 frames		Plate semi-finals Best of 5 frames		Plate final Best of 5 frames
(England) Barry Pinches	3
(Wales) Jak Jones	1	(England) Barry Pinches	3
(Belgium) Bjorn Haneveer	3	(Belgium) Bjorn Haneveer	1
(Wales) Dominic Dale	1			(England) Barry Pinches	3
(England) Pascal Richard	0			(England) Mitchell Mann	0
(England) Mitchell Mann	3	(England) Mitchell Mann	3
		(Germany) Lasse Münstermann	0

== Century breaks ==
- 136, 133, 103, 100 – Stephen Maguire
- 133 – Sam Baird
- 132, 129, 119 – Graeme Dott
- 132 – Mark Selby
- 130 – Joe Perry
- 128, 106 – Ali Carter
- 128 – Kyren Wilson
- 127, 120 – Joe Jogia
- 125, 119 – Xiao Guodong
- 124 – Alan McManus
- 123, 110 – David Grace
- 116 – Andrew Norman
- 112, 103 – Liu Chuang
- 112 – Andrew Pagett
- 111 – Mark Joyce
- 110, 102 – Anthony McGill
- 110, 100 – Fergal O'Brien
- 110 – Jack Lisowski
- 110 – Andy Hicks
- 110 – Marcus Campbell
- 108, 107, 100 – Mark Davis
- 108, 101 – Gerard Greene
- 107, 103, 102 – David Gilbert
- 107, 103 – Liam Highfield
- 107 – Judd Trump
- 107 – Jamie Brown
- 105 – Martin Gould
- 105 – Steve Davis
- 105 – Andrew Higginson
- 102 – Ben Woollaston
- 102 – Stuart Bingham
- 102 – Jamie Burnett
- 101 – Liu Song
- 100 – Jimmy White
