= 1999 Irish Masters =

Irish Masters
Tournament information
- Dates: 23–28 March 1999
- Venue: Goffs
- City: Kill
- Country: Ireland
- Organisation: WPBSA
- Format: Non-Ranking event
- Total prize fund: £200,000
- Winner's share: £75,000
- Highest break: Stephen Lee (ENG) (139)

Final
- Champion: (Scotland) Stephen Hendry
- Runner-up: (England) Stephen Lee
- Score: 9–8

The 1999 Irish Masters was the twenty-fifth edition of the professional invitational snooker tournament, which took place from 23 to 28 March 1999. The tournament was played at Goffs in Kill, County Kildare, and featured twelve professional players.

Stephen Hendry won the tournament for the third time, defeating Stephen Lee 9–8 in the final.

== Main draw ==
Round 1 Best of 11 frames
(England) Steve Davis	6
(England) John Parrott	3
(England) Peter Ebdon	6
(Republic of Ireland) Michael Judge	2
(England) Stephen Lee	6
(Scotland) Alan McManus	2
(England) Jimmy White	6
(Wales) Mark Williams	2

Quarter-finals; Best of 11 frames
(Scotland) Stephen Hendry	6
(England) Steve Davis	3
(England) Peter Ebdon	6
(Scotland) John Higgins	1
(England) Stephen Lee	6
(Republic of Ireland) Ken Doherty	1
(England) Jimmy White	6
(England) Ronnie O'Sullivan	4

Semi-finals; Best of 11 frames
(Scotland) Stephen Hendry	6
(England) Peter Ebdon	4
(England) Stephen Lee	6
(England) Jimmy White	3

Final; Best of 17 frames
(Scotland) Stephen Hendry	9
(England) Stephen Lee	8
