= 1999 China Open (snooker) =

China Open
Tournament information
- Dates: 11–19 December 1999
- Venue: JC Mandarin Hotel
- City: Shanghai
- Country: China
- Organisation: WPBSA
- Format: Ranking event
- Total prize fund: £305,000
- Winner's share: £50,000
- Highest break: Dave Harold (ENG) (140)

Final
- Champion: Ronnie O'Sullivan (ENG)
- Runner-up: Stephen Lee (ENG)
- Score: 9–2

The 1999 China Open (also known as the 1999 China International) was a professional ranking snooker tournament that took place between 11 and 19 December 1999 at the JC Mandarin Hotel in Shanghai, China. The tournament was the fourth ranking event out of the 1999/2000 season.

The defending champion was John Higgins, but he was eliminated in the first round, losing 1–5 against Peter Lines.

Ronnie O'Sullivan won the tournament by defeating Stephen Lee 9–2 in the final.

== Wildcard round ==
Match		Score	
WC1	Peter Lines (ENG)	5–3	Zhang Kai (CHN)
WC2	Anthony Davies (WAL)	5–1	Pang Weiguo (CHN)
WC3	Marco Fu (HKG)	5–3	Dai Han Lin (CHN)

== Main draw ==
Last 32; Best of 9 frames
1	(Scotland) John Higgins	1
42	(England) Peter Lines	5
13	(England) Peter Ebdon	5
(Scotland) Stephen Maguire	0
15	(England) Steve Davis	3
31	(England) Brian Morgan	5
5	(England) John Parrott	4
(England) Stuart Bingham	5
7	(Republic of Ireland) Ken Doherty	3
(England) Paul Sweeny	5
16	(England) Jimmy White	3
(England) Wayne Brown	5
11	(Republic of Ireland) Fergal O'Brien	3
(Pakistan) Shokat Ali	5
4	(England) Ronnie O'Sullivan	5
(Wales) Anthony Davies	2
3	(Wales) Mark Williams	5
17	(England) Dave Harold	4
12	(England) Paul Hunter	5
28	(Northern Ireland) Joe Swail	4
14	(England) Mark King	5
30	(Northern Ireland) Terry Murphy	3
6	(England) Stephen Lee	5
19	(Wales) Dominic Dale	3
8	(Scotland) Alan McManus	0
34	(England) Joe Perry	5
10	(England) Anthony Hamilton	4
25	(Scotland) Graeme Dott	5
9	(Wales) Matthew Stevens	5
27	(Scotland) Jamie Burnett	3
2	(Scotland) Stephen Hendry	5
35	(Hong Kong) Marco Fu	1

Last 16; Best of 9 frames
42	(England) Peter Lines	5
13	(England) Peter Ebdon	4
31	(England) Brian Morgan	5
(England) Stuart Bingham	2
(England) Paul Sweeny	5
(England) Wayne Brown	4
(Pakistan) Shokat Ali	2
4	(England) Ronnie O'Sullivan	5
3	(Wales) Mark Williams	5
12	(England) Paul Hunter	0
14	(England) Mark King	4
6	(England) Stephen Lee	5
34	(England) Joe Perry	5
25	(Scotland) Graeme Dott	3
9	(Wales) Matthew Stevens	2
2	(Scotland) Stephen Hendry	5

Quarter-finals; Best of 9 frames
42	(England) Peter Lines	4
31	(England) Brian Morgan	5
(England) Paul Sweeny	1
4	(England) Ronnie O'Sullivan	5
3	(Wales) Mark Williams	4
6	(England) Stephen Lee	5
34	(England) Joe Perry	4
2	(Scotland) Stephen Hendry	5

Semi-finals; Best of 11 frames
31	(England) Brian Morgan	5
4	(England) Ronnie O'Sullivan	6
6	(England) Stephen Lee	6
2	(Scotland) Stephen Hendry	4

Final; Best of 17 frames
4	(England) Ronnie O'Sullivan	9
6	(England) Stephen Lee	2

== Final ==
Final: Best of 19 frames. Referee: Alan Chamberlain. JC Mandarin Hotel in Shanghai, China, 19 December 1999.
Ronnie O'Sullivan (4); England	9–2	Stephen Lee (6); England
Afternoon: 61–23, 36–91, 115–17 (115), 94–8 (87) 124–8 (124), 93–16, 109–1, 75–43 (75); Evening: 20–85 (69), 75–1, 76–33 (56)
124	Highest break	69
2	Century breaks	0
5	50+ breaks	1
