= 2012 Players Tour Championship Grand Final =

2012 Betfair Players Tour Championship Grand Final

Tournament information
- Dates: 14–18 March 2012
- Venue: Bailey Allen Hall
- City: Galway
- Country: Ireland
- Organisation: World Snooker
- Format: Ranking event
- Total prize fund: £250,000
- Winner's share: £70,000
- Highest break: Neil Robertson (AUS) (131); Ricky Walden (ENG) (131)

Final
- Champion: Stephen Lee (ENG)
- Runner-up: Neil Robertson (AUS)
- Score: 4–0

The 2012 Players Tour Championship Grand Final (officially the 2012 Betfair Players Tour Championship Grand Final) was a professional ranking snooker tournament that took place between 14 and 18 March 2012 at the Bailey Allen Hall in Galway, Ireland.

Shaun Murphy was the defending champion, but he finished 37th on the Order of Merit, and didn't qualify.

Stephen Lee won his fifth ranking title by defeating Neil Robertson 4–0 in the final. It was Lee's first ranking title for six years, and Robertson's first defeat in a televised final.

It was also the final tournament Lee won in his professional snooker career, before he was given a 12-year ban from the sport later that year, after his suspicious match-fixing and betting patterns arose.

== Prize fund and ranking points ==
The breakdown of prize money and ranking points of the event is shown below:

| | Prize fund | Ranking points |
|---|---|---|
| Winner | £70,000 | 3,000 |
| Runner-up | £35,000 | 2,400 |
| Semi-finalist | £20,000 | 1,920 |
| Quarter-finalist | £10,000 | 1,500 |
| Last 16 | £5,000 | 1,140 |
| Last 24 | £2,750 | 840 |
| Highest break | £3,000 | – |
| Total | £250,000 | – |

== Seeding list ==
The leading 24 players in the PTC Order of Merit qualified for the event, provided that they had played in at least 6 events (3 in the UK and 3 in Europe).

| Rank | Player | Total points |
|---|---|---|
| 1 | Judd Trump (ENG) | 30,400 |
| 2 | Ronnie O'Sullivan (ENG) | 29,600 |
| 3 | Neil Robertson (AUS) | 28,100 |
| 4 | Michael Holt (ENG) | 17,500 |
| 5 | Mark Selby (ENG) | 17,100 |
| 6 | Graeme Dott (SCO) | 16,700 |
| 7 | Andrew Higginson (ENG) | 16,700 |
| 8 | Stephen Maguire (SCO) | 16,200 |
| 9 | Ben Woollaston (ENG) | 15,500 |
| 10 | Martin Gould (ENG) | 14,600 |
| 11 | Joe Perry (ENG) | 14,300 |
| 12 | Tom Ford (ENG) | 14,000 |
| 13 | John Higgins (SCO) | 13,100 |
| 14 | Stephen Lee (ENG) | 11,800 |
| 15 | Ricky Walden (ENG) | 11,600 |
| 16 | Mark Davis (ENG) | 10,500 |
| 17 | Matthew Stevens (WAL) | 9,600 |
| 18 | Xiao Guodong (CHN) | 9,100 |
| 19 | Fergal O'Brien (IRL) | 8,000 |
| 20 | Dominic Dale (WAL) | 7,600 |
| 21 | Barry Hawkins (ENG) | 7,600 |
| 22 | Ding Junhui (CHN) | 7,600 |
| 23 | Jamie Jones (WAL) | 7,300 |
| 24 | Jack Lisowski (ENG) | 7,100 |

== Main draw ==
Last 24; Best of 7 frames
18 | Xiao Guodong (CHN) | 4
20 | Dominic Dale (WAL) | 2
13 | John Higgins (SCO) | 3
23 | Jamie Jones (WAL) | 4
9 | Ben Woollaston (ENG) | 2
22 | Ding Junhui (CHN) | 4
10 | Martin Gould (ENG) | 1
14 | Stephen Lee (ENG) | 4
21 | Barry Hawkins (ENG) | 3
24 | Jack Lisowski (ENG) | 4
19 | Fergal O'Brien (IRL) | 0
11 | Joe Perry (ENG) | 4
16 | Mark Davis (ENG) | 4
12 | Tom Ford (ENG) | 1
15 | Ricky Walden (ENG) | 4
17 | Matthew Stevens (WAL) | 0

Last 16; Best of 7 frames
1 | Judd Trump (ENG) | 2
18 | (China) Xiao Guodong | 4
7 | Andrew Higginson (ENG) | 4
23 | (Wales) Jamie Jones | 3
5 | Mark Selby (ENG) | 4
22 | (China) Ding Junhui | 1
4 | Michael Holt (ENG) | 1
14 | (England) Stephen Lee | 4
3 | Neil Robertson (AUS) | 4
24 | (England) Jack Lisowski | 1
6 | Graeme Dott (SCO) | 2
11 | (England) Joe Perry | 4
8 | Stephen Maguire (SCO) | 4
16 | (England) Mark Davis | 2
2 | Ronnie O'Sullivan (ENG) | w/d
15 | (England) Ricky Walden | w/o

Quarter-finals; Best of 7 frames
18 | (China) Xiao Guodong | 1
7 | (England) Andrew Higginson | 4
5 | (England) Mark Selby | 0
14 | (England) Stephen Lee | 4
3 | (Australia) Neil Robertson | 4
11 | (England) Joe Perry | 1
8 | (Scotland) Stephen Maguire | 4
15 | (England) Ricky Walden | 3

Semi-finals; Best of 7 frames
7 | (England) Andrew Higginson | 2
14 | (England) Stephen Lee | 4
3 | (Australia) Neil Robertson | 4
8 | (Scotland) Stephen Maguire | 0

Final; Best of 7 frames
14 | (England) Stephen Lee | 4
3 | (Australia) Neil Robertson | 0

== Final ==
Final: Best of 7 frames. Referee: Paul Collier. Bailey Allen Hall, Galway, Ireland, 18 March 2012.
| Stephen Lee (14); England | 4–0 | Neil Robertson (3); Australia |
65–48, 62–25 (52), 63–25, 73–66 (Lee 66)
| 66 | Highest break | 35 |
| 0 | Century breaks | 0 |
| 2 | 50+ breaks | 0 |

== Century breaks ==
- 131, 130, 104 – Ricky Walden
- 131, 110 – Neil Robertson
- 123, 105 – Ding Junhui
- 123 – John Higgins
- 120, 104 – Andrew Higginson
- 114, 102 – Stephen Lee
- 100 – Xiao Guodong
- 100 – Joe Perry
