= Stephen Lee (snooker player) =

English snooker player (born 1974)

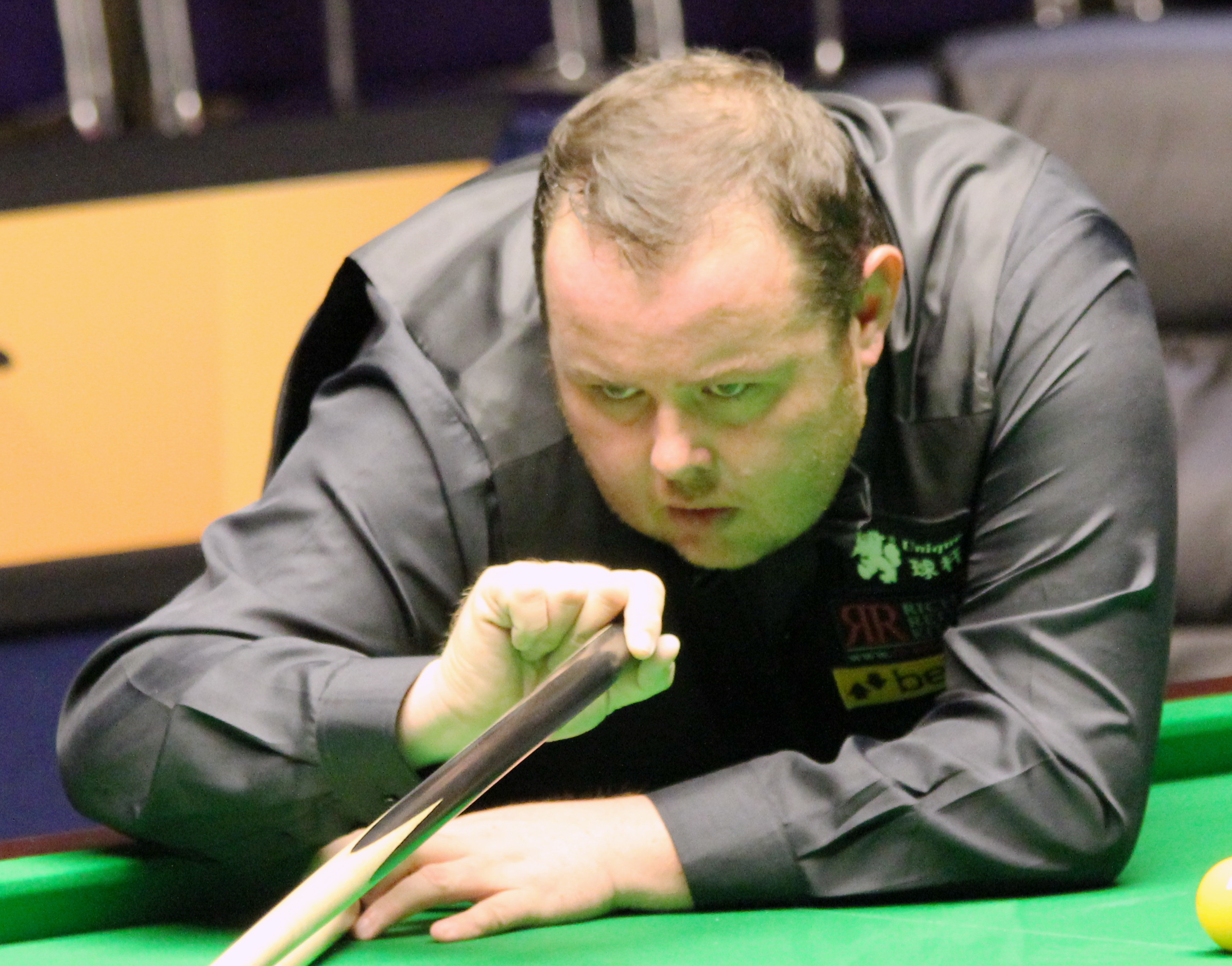
- Lee at the 2012 Paul Hunter Classic

Personal information
- Born: 12 October 1974 (age 52) Trowbridge, Wiltshire, England

Sport
- Country: England
- Sport: Snooker
- Professional: 1992–2014
- Highest ranking: 5 (2000/2001, 2003/04)
- Century breaks: 184

Tournament wins
- Ranking: 5
- Minor-ranking: 2

Stephen Lee (born 12 October 1974) is an English former professional snooker player. He turned professional in 1992, reached a career-high of fifth in the snooker world rankings for the 2000–01 season, and won five ranking titles. His best performances in Triple Crown events were reaching the semi-finals of the 2003 World Championship, where he lost to eventual champion Mark Williams, and reaching the final of the 2008 Masters, where he was runner-up to Mark Selby. He compiled 184 century breaks in professional competition and was noted for his smooth cue action.

West Midlands police arrested Lee in February 2010 as part of an investigation into suspicious betting patterns at the 2009 UK Championship, but no further action was taken against him at that time. Following further reports of irregular betting patterns on a 2012 Premier League match between Lee and John Higgins on 11 October 2012, the World Professional Billiards and Snooker Association (WPBSA) suspended Lee the next day and subsequently brought match-fixing charges against him. After an independent tribunal found Lee guilty of influencing the outcome of seven matches in 2008 and 2009, he was banned from competing in or attending any WPBSA-affiliated tournament for 12 years, backdated to the beginning of his suspension. This was the longest ban handed down in the sport until Liang Wenbo and Li Hang received lifetime bans in 2023. Lee appealed the decision, but was dismissed in May 2014, meaning that his ban remained in force until 12 October 2024, also the date of his 50th birthday. Lee was ordered to pay the WPBSA £125,000 in costs relating to his hearing and appeal, but has not yet done so.

== Career ==
=== Early career ===
Lee turned professional after winning the English Amateur Championship in 1992. During his first season as a professional he had a run of 33 successive frames won during qualifying matches, an all-time professional record. He reached the Top 16 of the rankings five years later, despite never having reached the semi-finals of a ranking event at this point. He entered the Top 8 after winning his first ranking title during the 1998–99 season.

=== 1998–2011 ===
His first ranking victory came at the Grand Prix, in 1998 defeating Dave Harold 6–4 in a hard-fought semi-final that saw Lee come from 3–0 and 4–1 down, before beating newcomer Marco Fu convincingly in the final, 9–2. His first ranking title and first two ranking semi-finals were all achieved without beating a top-16 player. After a failed drugs test in 2000 briefly upset his momentum, he scored more ranking points than any other player in the 2001–02 season (winning the Scottish Open as well as the Grand Prix), thus briefly making him the provisional world No. 1 early in the following season. Lee was favourite to win the 2001 Masters, but lost 5–6 in the first round to John Parrott. He was part of the England team which won the 2001 Nations Cup. His best run in the World Championship came in the 2003 event when he reached the semi-finals.

Due to a dip in form, at the 2006 Welsh Open he came to the competition outside the provisional Top 16 after failing to win a ranking tournament for four years. He went on to win the tournament, beating the then World Champion, Shaun Murphy, 9–4 in the final.

For 2007–08 he slipped to No. 13 in the rankings after reaching just one semi-final, partly due to missing the China Open for personal reasons. He nevertheless reached the final of the 2008 Masters, losing 3–10 to Mark Selby. Following a heavy defeat by Joe Swail in the first round of the 2008 World Championship, confirming his drop out of the top 16 of the rankings, Lee considered retiring from the game.

However, he did compete in the first ranking event of the 2008–09 season, the 2008 Northern Ireland Trophy, and after convincing wins over Judd Trump and Stephen Hendry, he reached the last 16, where despite making three century breaks he lost 4–5 to eventual runner-up Dave Harold. He then failed to qualify for the Shanghai Masters, losing 4–5 to Tom Ford. He reached the televised stages of the 2009 World Championship by defeating Judd Trump in qualifying, but was beaten 10–4 in the first round by Ryan Day.

On 11 February 2010 Lee was arrested by West Midlands Police on suspicion of cheating, in relation to an investigation by the Gambling Commission over suspicious betting patterns.

During the 2010–11 season Lee managed to regain some form including a win in Event 4 of the EPTC events. However, he drew John Higgins in the first round at both the 2010 UK Championship and World Championship, losing on both occasions with Higgins going on to eventually win both events. At the China Open he drew Mark Williams in the first round and despite Williams making four centuries he won 5–4, making a gutsy 61 clearance to the black in the decider. He went on to reach the quarter-finals, where he lost to Ding Junhui 5–2. Lee won a non-ranking event in 2011 in the CCI Open Invitational he beat Jimmy White 10–7 in the final in Mumbai.

=== Return to form ===
Lee began the 2011–12 season ranked 18 and lost in qualifying for the Australian Goldfields Open and in the first round of the Shanghai Masters. However, he had an excellent run of form in the PTC Events by reaching the quarter-finals of Events 3 and 4 and going one better in Event 6, as he lost to Neil Robertson in the last 4. This meant that Lee returned to the top 16 in October, as he was ranked 13 and therefore gained automatic entry into the upcoming ranking events. He lost in the first round of the 2011 UK Championship and in the German Masters reached his first semi-final since the 2006 Northern Ireland Trophy, but could not get past Ronnie O'Sullivan, who won 6–4. He then made it to the quarter-finals of the Welsh Open, where he was put off by a mobile phone ringing on his back-swing in a deciding frame against Ding Junhui and went on to lose the match. He used his frustration from the incident to good effect however, as he beat Dominic Dale, Neil Robertson, Graeme Dott and Robert Milkins to reach the final of the World Open, his first since the 2006 Welsh Open. He played Mark Allen, but was dominated throughout, as he lost the match 1–10.

Lee enjoyed further success on the PTC calendar as he reached another semi-final, to finish 14th on the Order of Merit and therefore qualified for the last 24 of the Finals. It was in the finals where Lee won his first ranking title for six years as he dropped just three frames during the tournament, including 4–0 whitewashes over Mark Selby and in the final versus Robertson, where Lee became the first player to beat the Australian in a ranking event final. Lee's form in the second half of the season continued into the China Open as he registered his third ranking event semi-final of the year by defeating Judd Trump again, but could not feature in three successive finals as he lost 2–6 to Stephen Maguire. His season did finish in disappointment though as he was beaten in the first round of the World Championship 6–10 by Andrew Higginson. Nevertheless, Lee climbed 10 places in the world rankings to end the season at number 8, the highest he has been since 2003.

== Match-fixing and ban ==
Lee was arrested and bailed on suspicion of match-fixing on 11 February 2010. This followed a police investigation into suspicious betting patterns relating to a match played in 2009, believed to have taken place at the 2009 UK Championship. On 2 October 2012, the WPBSA released a statement confirming that the Crown Prosecution Service would not be taking further action against Lee over the claims. Nine days after the statement was issued, Lee was involved in another controversial match on 11 October which resulted in a 2–4 defeat by John Higgins at a Premier League fixture after Lee had been leading the match 2–1, which caused fellow professional Judd Trump to question the integrity of the result on Twitter, especially since Lee squandered a golden opportunity to level the match at 3 frames all. The following day—on his 38th birthday—Lee was suspended by the WPBSA following reports by at least two bookmakers of irregular betting patterns connected to the Premier League match, pending a full inquiry. Lee appealed against the decision made by the Chairman of the WPBSA; Robert Englehart QC—appointed by Sport Resolutions UK to consider Lee's appeal against suspension—dismissed it, deciding the suspension should remain in place until either the conclusion of the investigation or any resultant hearings.

On 14 February 2013, the WPBSA brought charges against Lee concerning his group matches at the 2008 Malta Cup, two matches at the 2008 UK Championship, his match at the 2009 China Open, and a match at the 2009 World Snooker Championship. He was charged with violating sections 2.8 and 2.9 of the Members Rules and Regulations, which concern divulging information not already in the public domain with the express purpose of it being used for match-betting, and entering into an arrangement to influence the result of a game. Lee applied for permission to play in the 2013 World Championship in the event that the proceedings against him would be brought to a close before the draw was made, but it later transpired that he would be unable to participate in the tournament after learning that his hearing would not take place before the qualifying draw. On 10 April, the WPBSA announced that they would no longer be proceeding with the investigation into the Premier League match, although the inquiry into the remaining match-fixing charges would still go ahead. While suspended from WSA tournaments, Lee continued to compete in independently organised events, winning the RKGKhar Gymkhana Snooker Masters in May.

The case was heard by independent tribunal, Sport Resolutions UK, in a three-day hearing chaired by Adam Lewis QC, starting on 9 September 2013. The verdict was delivered on 16 September, with Lee found guilty of influencing the outcome of seven matches in 2008 and 2009. On 25 September, he received a twelve-year ban from WSA events, backdated to the beginning of his suspension on 12 October 2012, running through to his 50th birthday on 12 October 2024, and ordered to pay £40,000 in costs. Up until then it was the longest ban ever imposed in the sport until the lifetime bans given to Liang Wenbo and Li Hang in 2023. Lee subsequently appealed against the "finding of the tribunal, the sanction and the costs awarded". Sport Resolutions appointed Edwin Glasgow QC to chair the appeal, with the Appeals Committee determining that the appeal should be heard in two parts. Originally set for 30 January 2014, the appeal was adjourned to 17 February. In the first stage of his appeal Lee challenged the independence of Adam Lewis, chairman of the original tribunal. Lewis had previously represented Leyton Orient F.C.—owned by World Snooker's CEO, Barry Hearn—in a legal dispute, and Lee's legal team argued there was a conflict of interest. The argument was rejected on 25 February, and he was ordered to pay a further £30,000 in costs. The appeals panel recused itself from the second part of the appeal—in which Lee would challenge the guilty verdict itself—after finding him to be an unreliable witness. On 15 May, with Nicholas Stewart QC presiding, the remainder of the appeal was dismissed and the costs awarded against Lee at the Adam Lewis hearing were increased from £40,000 to £75,000. Stewart also awarded further costs of £20,000 against Lee for the second part of his appeal, bringing the total costs awarded against him to £125,000. Lee has never discharged these legal costs. He was removed from the snooker tour and world rankings in June 2014.

Following the end of his ban, Lee played his first match in a six-red exhibition against James Wattana in August 2025. Lee won the match 2–1, with a 46 break in the first frame.

== Personal life ==
Lee married his long-term partner Laura in 2005. He has four children, including twin sons. His son Alfie Lee has become a noted amateur snooker player. When playing on the professional tour, Lee was noted for his unusually high weight.

In September 2015, Lee was featured on the BBC's Inside Out West documentary series, which revealed that he had plans to establish a snooker coaching club for children and young people, in the Chinese city of Shenzhen.

=== Criminal convictions ===
Since leaving the professional game, Lee has had several run-ins with the law. On 9 June 2014 Lee pleaded guilty to fraud at Swindon Magistrates' Court and was fined £110. Lee had sold his personal snooker cue to a Facebook fan for £1,600, but when he failed to deliver the cue, the fan reported the matter to the police. Lee was also ordered to repay the £1,600 cost of the cue.

On 12 April 2018, Lee was arrested in Hong Kong following an immigration raid at a billiards hall. Lee was charged with teaching snooker without a work permit and appeared in court on 14 April 2018, where he pleaded not guilty to breaching the conditions of his tourist visa. Lee was forced to surrender his passport and was bailed until June 2018. Lee changed his plea to a guilty plea on the first day of his trial and the case was dismissed after he agreed to a 12-month good behaviour bond of HK$1,000 (£95).

== Performance and rankings timeline ==
Tournament	1992/ 93	1993/ 94	1994/ 95	1995/ 96	1996/ 97	1997/ 98	1998/ 99	1999/ 00	2000/ 01	2001/ 02	2002/ 03	2003/ 04	2004/ 05	2005/ 06	2006/ 07	2007/ 08	2008/ 09	2009/ 10	2010/ 11	2011/ 12	2012/ 13
Ranking (Note: From the 2010/2011 season it shows the ranking at the beginning of the season.)	(Note: New players on the Main Tour don't have a ranking.)	101	40	37	31	16	9	6	5	8	7	5	9	10	10	13	26	25	23	18	8
Ranking tournaments
Wuxi Classic	Tournament Not Held																Non-Ranking Event				1R
Australian Goldfields Open (Note: The event run under different names as Australian Open (1994/1995) and Australian Masters (1995/1996))	Not Held		NR		Tournament Not Held															LQ	QF
Shanghai Masters	Tournament Not Held															QF	LQ	1R	1R	1R	2R
International Championship	Tournament Not Held																				WD
UK Championship	1R	LQ	LQ	3R	2R	SF	2R	2R	QF	SF	3R	3R	QF	2R	3R	1R	QF	2R	1R	1R	A
German Masters (Note: The event run under different name as German Open (1995/1996–1997/1998))	Not Held			LQ	1R	2R	NR	Tournament Not Held											1R	SF	A
Welsh Open	LQ	1R	2R	LQ	1R	3R	2R	F	SF	1R	2R	3R	2R	W	2R	QF	LQ	LQ	LQ	QF	A
World Open (Note: The event run under different names as Grand Prix (1992/1993–2000/2001 and 2004/2005–2009/2010), LG Cup (2001/2002–2003/2004), the World Open (2010/2011) and the Haikou World Open (2011/2012))	LQ	QF	1R	LQ	2R	2R	W	2R	3R	W	3R	2R	3R	1R	2R	RR	LQ	LQ	2R	F	A
Players Championship Grand Final (Note: The event run under different name as Players Tour Championship Grand Finals (2010/2011–2012/2013))	Tournament Not Held																		QF	W	A
China Open (Note: The event run under different name as China International (1997/1998–1998/1999))	Tournament Not Held					NR	QF	F	QF	QF	Not Held		2R	QF	WD	1R	1R	LQ	QF	SF	A
World Championship	LQ	LQ	1R	LQ	2R	2R	QF	2R	2R	QF	SF	1R	2R	2R	1R	1R	1R	1R	1R	1R	A
Non-ranking tournaments
Six-red World Championship	Tournament Not Held																A	A	A	NH	3R
Premier League (Note: The event ran under a different name as the European League (1992/1993–1996/1997))	A	A	A	A	A	A	A	A	A	A	A	A	A	A	A	A	A	A	A	A	WD
The Masters	LQ	LQ	A	LQ	LQ	1R	1R	SF	1R	1R	QF	QF	1R	SF	QF	F	LQ	LQ	A	1R	A
Shoot-Out	Tournament Not Held																		2R	3R	A
Championship League	Tournament Not Held															RR	A	A	RR	RR	A
General Cup	Tournament Not Held												A	Tournament Not Held				A	NH	W	A
Former ranking tournaments
Dubai Classic (Note: The event ran under different names such as the Thailand Classic (1995/1996) and Asian Classic (1996/1997))	LQ	1R	LQ	LQ	1R	Tournament Not Held															
Malta Grand Prix	Not Held		Non-Ranking Event					SF	NR	Tournament Not Held											
Thailand Masters (Note: The event ran under different names as the Asian Open (1992/1993) and Thailand Open (1993/1994–1996/1997))	3R	LQ	LQ	1R	QF	2R	2R	QF	2R	F	NR	Not Held			NR	Tournament Not Held					
Scottish Open (Note: The event ran under different names such as the International Open (1992/1993–1996/1997) and Players Championship (2003/2004))	LQ	LQ	LQ	QF	2R	SF	QF	WD	2R	W	QF	2R	Tournament Not Held								
British Open	3R	LQ	1R	3R	1R	3R	WD	QF	3R	QF	2R	SF	3R	Tournament Not Held							
Irish Masters	Non-Ranking Event										1R	2R	QF	NH	NR	Tournament Not Held					
Malta Cup (Note: The event ran under different names such as the European Open (1992/1993–1996/1997 and 2001/2002–2003/2004) and Irish Open (1998/1999))	QF	LQ	LQ	2R	QF	NH	QF	Not Held		QF	QF	SF	1R	1R	2R	NR	Tournament Not Held				
Northern Ireland Trophy	Tournament Not Held													NR	SF	2R	3R	Tournament Not Held			
Bahrain Championship	Tournament Not Held																2R	Tournament Not Held			
Former non-ranking tournaments
German Masters	Not Held			Ranking Event			QF	Tournament Not Held											Ranking		
Millennium Cup	Tournament Not Held							W	Tournament Not Held												
Pontins Professional	A	A	A	A	A	A	SF	QF	Tournament Not Held												
Champions Cup (Note: The event ran under a different name as Charity Challenge (1994/1995–1998/1999))	Not Held		A	A	A	A	A	RR	RR	A	Tournament Not Held										
Malta Grand Prix	Not Held		A	A	A	A	A	R	RR	Tournament Not Held											
Scottish Masters	A	A	A	A	A	A	LQ	QF	QF	QF	SF	Tournament Not Held									
Irish Masters	A	A	A	A	A	A	F	1R	1R	QF	Ranking Event			NH	QF	Tournament Not Held					
Malta Cup	Ranking Event					NH	R	Not Held		Ranking Event						RR	Tournament Not Held				
Brazil Masters	Tournament Not Held																			1R	NH
Power Snooker	Tournament Not Held																		A	QF	NH

Performance table legend
LQ	lost in the qualifying draw	#R	lost in the early rounds of the tournament (WR = Wildcard round, RR = Round robin)	QF	lost in the quarter-finals
SF	lost in the semi–finals	F	lost in the final	W	won the tournament
DNQ	did not qualify for the tournament	A	did not participate in the tournament	WD	withdrew from the tournament

NH / Not Held	event was not held.
NR / Non-Ranking Event	event is/was no longer a ranking event.
R / Ranking Event	event is/was a ranking event.
MR / Minor-Ranking Event	event is/was a minor-ranking event.

== Career finals ==
=== Ranking finals: 9 (5 titles) ===
Outcome	No.	Year	Championship	Opponent in the final	Score
Winner	1.	1998	Grand Prix	(Hong Kong) Marco Fu	9–2
Runner-up	1.	1999	China Open	(England) Ronnie O'Sullivan	2–9
Runner-up	2.	2000	Welsh Open	(Scotland) John Higgins	8–9
Winner	2.	2001	LG Cup (2)	(England) Peter Ebdon	9–4
Runner-up	3.	2002	Thailand Masters	(Wales) Mark Williams	4–9
Winner	3.	2002	Scottish Open	(England) David Gray	9–2
Winner	4.	2006	Welsh Open	(England) Shaun Murphy	9–4
Runner-up	4.	2012	World Open	(Northern Ireland) Mark Allen	1–10
Winner	5.	2012	Players Tour Championship Finals	(Australia) Neil Robertson	4–0

=== Minor-ranking finals: 3 (2 titles) ===
Outcome	No.	Year	Championship	Opponent in the final	Score
Winner	1.	2010	MIUS Cup	(Scotland) Stephen Maguire	4–2
Runner-up	1.	2012	Asian Players Tour Championship – Event 1	(England) Stuart Bingham	3–4
Winner	2.	2012	Asian Players Tour Championship – Event 2	(China) Ding Junhui	4–0

=== Non-ranking finals: 4 (2 titles) ===
Legend
The Masters (0–1)
Other (2–1)

Outcome	No.	Year	Championship	Opponent in the final	Score
Runner-up	1.	1999	Irish Masters	(Scotland) Stephen Hendry	8–9
Winner	1.	1999	Millennium Cup	(England) Ronnie O'Sullivan	7–2
Runner-up	2.	2008	The Masters	(England) Mark Selby	3–10
Winner	2.	2011	General Cup	(England) Ricky Walden	7–6

=== Pro-am finals: 7 (4 titles) ===
Outcome	No.	Year	Championship	Opponent in the final	Score
Runner-up	1.	1995	Pontins Autumn Open	(Scotland) Graeme Dott	1–5
Runner-up	2.	2007	Austrian Open	(England) Tom Ford	4–5
Winner	1.	2010	Vienna Snooker Open	(Belgium) Bjorn Haneveer	5–4
Winner	2.	2011	Cricket Club of India Open Invitational	(England) Jimmy White	10–7
Winner	3.	2013	3 Kings Open	(Malta) Tony Drago	5–4
Winner	4.	2013	RKG-Khar Gymkhana Snooker Masters	(India) Pankaj Advani	10–9
Runner-up	3.	2023	CCI Snooker Classic	(India) Pankaj Advani	2–7

=== Team finals: 1 (1 title) ===
Outcome	No.	Year	Championship	Team	Opponent in the final	Score
Winner	1.	2000	Nations Cup	England	Wales	6–4

=== Amateur finals: 5 (4 titles) ===
Outcome	No.	Year	Championship	Opponent in the final	Score
Runner-up	1.	1989	UK Under-15 Championship	(England) Jonathan Saunders	1–3
Winner	1.	1990	British Under-16 Championship	(England) Matthew Paffett	3–0
Winner	2.	1992	British Under-18 Championship	(England) Paul Hunter	4–2
Winner	3.	1992	English Amateur Championship	(England) Neil Mosley	13–8
Winner	4.	2025	Embassy Snooker Open	(United States) Renat Denkha	5–1

== See also ==
- List of snooker players investigated for match-fixing
