= 2012 World Open (snooker) =

Star Xing Pai Haikou World Open
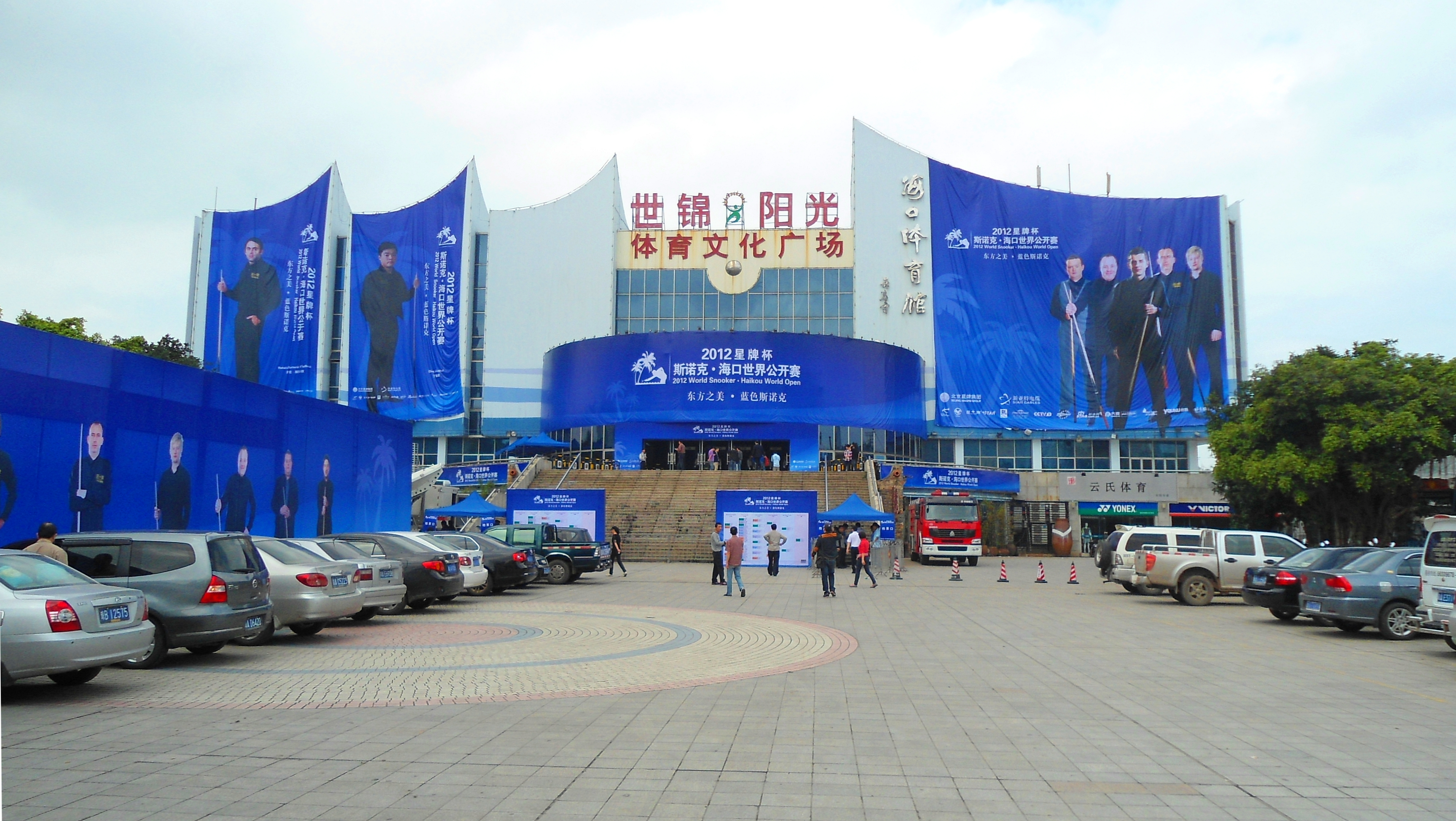

Tournament information
- Dates: 27 February – 4 March 2012
- Venue: Haikou Stadium
- City: Haikou
- Country: China
- Organisation: World Snooker
- Format: Ranking event
- Total prize fund: £400,500
- Winner's share: £75,000
- Highest break: Stephen Lee (ENG) (138)

Final
- Champion: Mark Allen (NIR)
- Runner-up: Stephen Lee (ENG)
- Score: 10–1

The 2012 Star Xing Pai Haikou World Open was a professional ranking snooker tournament that took place between 27 February – 4 March 2012 at the Haikou Stadium in Haikou, China. It was the first time that the tournament was held outside the United Kingdom. It was televised on ITV4

Marco Fu made the 86th official maximum break during his round 4 qualifying match against Matthew Selt. This was Fu's second 147 break.

Neil Robertson was the defending champion, but lost 2–5 against Stephen Lee in the second round.

Mark Allen won his first ranking title by defeating Stephen Lee 10–1 in the final.

== Prize fund ==
The breakdown of prize money for this year is shown below:

- Winner: £75,000
- Runner-up: £34,000
- Semi-final: £16,000
- Quarter-final: £10,000
- Last 16: £7,500
- Last 32: £6,000
- Last 48: £2,300
- Last 64: £1,500
- Stage one highest break: £500
- Stage two highest break: £2,000
- Stage one maximum break: £500
- Total: £400,500

== Wildcard round ==
These matches were played in Haikou on 27 February 2012.

Match		Score	
WC1	Sam Baird (ENG)	3–5	Jin Long (CHN)
WC2	Robert Milkins (ENG)	5–3	Thanawat Thirapongpaiboon (THA)
WC3	Mark King (ENG)	5–2	Hossein Vafaei (IRI)
WC4	Tom Ford (ENG)	5–4	Lyu Haotian (CHN)
WC5	Jimmy Robertson (ENG)	5–2	Zhou Yuelong (CHN)
WC6	Joe Perry (ENG)	5–0	Rouzi Maimaiti (CHN)
WC7	Michael Holt (ENG)	5–4	Zhu Yinghui (CHN)
WC8	Nigel Bond (ENG)	4–5	Lu Ning (CHN)

== Main draw ==
Last 32; Best of 9 frames
1	(Scotland) John Higgins	5
(Hong Kong) Marco Fu	3
12	(England) Martin Gould	4
(England) Jamie Cope	5
9	(China) Ding Junhui	1
(China) Jin Long	5
8	(Scotland) Stephen Maguire	3
(England) Robert Milkins	5
7	(Scotland) Graeme Dott	5
(England) Barry Hawkins	2
11	(England) Ali Carter	w/d
(Scotland) Marcus Campbell	w/o
15	(England) Stephen Lee	5
(Wales) Dominic Dale	0
4	(Australia) Neil Robertson	5
(Scotland) Stephen Hendry	3
3	(Wales) Mark Williams	1
(England) Mark King	5
16	(England) Ronnie O'Sullivan	w/d
(England) Tom Ford	w/o
10	(Northern Ireland) Mark Allen	5
(England) Jimmy Robertson	1
5	(England) Judd Trump	5
(England) Andrew Higginson	0
6	(England) Shaun Murphy	5
(England) Ricky Walden	3
13	(Wales) Matthew Stevens	4
(England) Joe Perry	5
14	(England) Stuart Bingham	0
(England) Michael Holt	5
2	(England) Mark Selby	5
(China) Lu Ning	3

Last 16; Best of 9 frames
1	(Scotland) John Higgins	5
(England) Jamie Cope	0
(China) Jin Long	2
(England) Robert Milkins	5
7	(Scotland) Graeme Dott	5
(Scotland) Marcus Campbell	3
15	(England) Stephen Lee	5
4	(Australia) Neil Robertson	2
(England) Mark King	5
(England) Tom Ford	4
10	(Northern Ireland) Mark Allen	5
5	(England) Judd Trump	4
6	(England) Shaun Murphy	5
(England) Joe Perry	3
(England) Michael Holt	3
2	(England) Mark Selby	5

Quarter-finals; Best of 9 frames
1	(Scotland) John Higgins	3
(England) Robert Milkins	5
7	(Scotland) Graeme Dott	1
15	(England) Stephen Lee	5
(England) Mark King	1
10	(Northern Ireland) Mark Allen	5
6	(England) Shaun Murphy	0
2	(England) Mark Selby	5

Semi-finals; Best of 11 frames
(England) Robert Milkins	2
15	(England) Stephen Lee	6
10	(Northern Ireland) Mark Allen	6
2	(England) Mark Selby	5

Final; Best of 19 frames
15	(England) Stephen Lee	1
10	(Northern Ireland) Mark Allen	10

== Final ==
Final: Best of 19 frames. Referee: Leo Scullion. Haikou Stadium, Haikou, China, 4 March 2012.
Stephen Lee (15); England	1–10	Mark Allen (10); Northern Ireland
Afternoon: 55–66, 0–104 (104), 26–59 (50), 7–127 (127), 2–59 (53), 68–55 (67, 55), 39–72, 67–76, 0–123 (123); Evening: 18–69, 19–105 (104)
67	Highest break	127
0	Century breaks	4
1	50+ breaks	7

== Qualifying ==
These matches were held between 11 and 14 January 2012 at the World Snooker Academy, Sheffield, England.

Round 1 Best of 9 frames
(Republic of Ireland) David Morris	5
(England) Adam Wicheard	4
(England) Sam Baird	5
(Belgium) Luca Brecel	3
(England) Sam Craigie	5
(Wales) Daniel Wells	2
(China) Tian Pengfei	5
(England) Stuart Carrington	4
(England) David Grace	3
(India) Aditya Mehta	5
(England) Andrew Norman	5
(England) Paul Davison	1
(China) Yu Delu	5
(China) Cao Yupeng	2
(Wales) Andrew Pagett	2
(Thailand) Dechawat Poomjaeng	5
(England) Adam Duffy	5
(India) Lucky Vatnani	2

Round 2 Best of 9 frames
(Malta) Tony Drago	5
(Republic of Ireland) David Morris	3
(England) David Gilbert	5
(Thailand) Passakorn Suwannawat	3
(China) Liu Chuang	1
(England) Sam Baird	5
(England) Barry Pinches	3
(England) Sam Craigie	5
(England) Peter Lines	2
(England) Ian McCulloch	5
(China) Xiao Guodong	3
(England) Alfie Burden	5
(England) Dave Harold	5
(England) Rod Lawler	1
(England) Adrian Gunnell	3
(China) Tian Pengfei	5
(Wales) Michael White	5
(India) Aditya Mehta	1
(Scotland) Anthony McGill	5
(Northern Ireland) Joe Swail	1
(England) Jimmy Robertson	5
(England) Andrew Norman	2
(England) Andy Hicks	2
(China) Yu Delu	5
(England) Mark Joyce	4
(Norway) Kurt Maflin	5
(England) Ben Woollaston	3
(England) Liam Highfield	5
(China) Liu Song	4
(Thailand) Dechawat Poomjaeng	5
(Thailand) James Wattana	2
(England) Adam Duffy	5

Round 3 Best of 9 frames
(England) Matthew Selt	5
(Malta) Tony Drago	2
(Scotland) Jamie Burnett	5
(England) David Gilbert	3
(England) Jimmy White	1
(England) Sam Baird	5
(England) Robert Milkins	5
(England) Sam Craigie	1
(England) Steve Davis	1
(England) Ian McCulloch	5
(England) Jack Lisowski	1
(England) Alfie Burden	5
(England) Joe Jogia	2
(England) Dave Harold	5
(England) Mike Dunn	5
(China) Tian Pengfei	2
(China) Liang Wenbo	5
(Wales) Michael White	4
(Wales) Jamie Jones	5
(Scotland) Anthony McGill	1
(Republic of Ireland) Ken Doherty	4
(England) Jimmy Robertson	5
(Scotland) Alan McManus	1
(China) Yu Delu	5
(Northern Ireland) Gerard Greene	5
(Norway) Kurt Maflin	3
(England) Anthony Hamilton	5
(England) Liam Highfield	4
(England) Michael Holt	5
(Thailand) Dechawat Poomjaeng	4
(England) Nigel Bond	5
(England) Adam Duffy	3

Round 4 Best of 9 frames
(Hong Kong) Marco Fu	5
(England) Matthew Selt	2
(England) Jamie Cope	5
(Scotland) Jamie Burnett	1
(England) Mark Davis	4
(England) Sam Baird	5
(Wales) Ryan Day	0
(England) Robert Milkins	5
(England) Barry Hawkins	5
(England) Ian McCulloch	4
(Scotland) Marcus Campbell	5
(England) Alfie Burden	3
(Wales) Dominic Dale	5
(England) Dave Harold	4
(Scotland) Stephen Hendry	5
(England) Mike Dunn	2
(England) Mark King	5
(China) Liang Wenbo	4
(England) Tom Ford	5
(Wales) Jamie Jones	4
(England) Rory McLeod	3
(England) Jimmy Robertson	5
(England) Andrew Higginson	5
(China) Yu Delu	3
(England) Ricky Walden	5
(Northern Ireland) Gerard Greene	4
(England) Joe Perry	5
(England) Anthony Hamilton	1
(England) Peter Ebdon	3
(England) Michael Holt	5
(Republic of Ireland) Fergal O'Brien	4
(England) Nigel Bond	5

== Century breaks ==
=== Qualifying stage centuries ===
- 147 – Marco Fu
- 138 – Marcus Campbell
- 137 – Mark Davis
- 136 – Yu Delu
- 135, 125 – Anthony Hamilton
- 132 – Kurt Maflin
- 123, 103 – Alfie Burden
- 122 – Robert Milkins
- 121, 104 – David Gilbert
- 120 – Joe Jogia
- 119, 118 – Tian Pengfei
- 118 – Liam Highfield
- 117 – Andrew Norman
- 116 – Andrew Higginson
- 116 – Michael Holt
- 113 – Sam Baird
- 110, 103 – Michael White
- 107 – Adrian Gunnell
- 106 – Sam Craigie
- 104, 100 – Jimmy Robertson
- 104 – Liang Wenbo
- 103 – Fergal O'Brien
- 100 – Ken Doherty

=== Televised stage centuries ===
- 138, 120, 109 – Stephen Lee
- 136, 133 – John Higgins
- 136, 106 – Neil Robertson
- 135, 101, 101 – Michael Holt
- 131, 115 – Shaun Murphy
- 127, 123, 112, 105, 104, 104, 103, 101, 100, 100, 100 – Mark Allen
- 117, 112, 109, 108, 105, 102 – Mark Selby
- 117, 106, 102 – Robert Milkins
- 111, 104 – Judd Trump
- 100 – Tom Ford
