= Tom Ford (snooker player) =

English professional snooker player

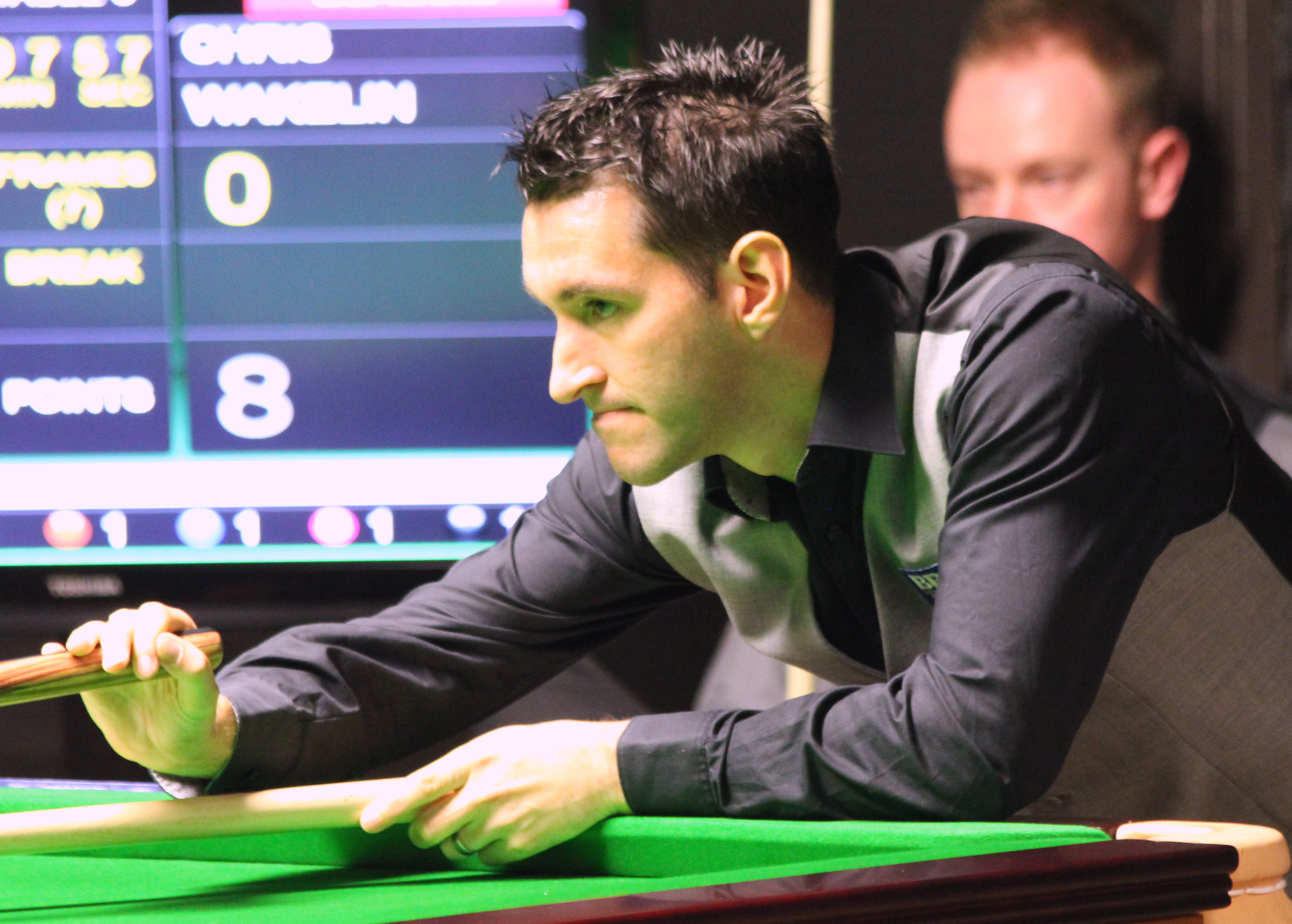
- Ford at the 2016 Paul Hunter Classic

Personal information
- Nickname: Model T
- Born: 17 August 1983 (age 43) Leicester, England

Sport
- Country: England
- Sport: Snooker
- Professional: 2001–02, 2003–present
- Highest ranking: 13 (May 2024)
- Current ranking: 36 (as of 7 November 2026)
- Maximum breaks: 5
- Century breaks: 332 (as of 19 November 2026)

Tournament wins
- Ranking: 1
- Minor-ranking: 2

Tom Ford (born 17 August 1983) is an English professional snooker player from Leicester. Turning professional in 2001, Ford won his first ranking event at the 2024 Snooker Shoot Out. Ford has reached three further ranking finals - the 2016 Paul Hunter Classic, the 2023 German Masters and the 2023 International Championship.

Ford has compiled five maximum breaks in competitive play, and over 300 century breaks.

== Career ==
=== Early years ===
As a junior, Ford played against Mark Selby frequently. He began his professional career by playing the Challenge Tour in 2001, at the time the second-level professional tour. His first quarter-final came at the 2005 Malta Cup where he beat Ken Doherty, but eventually lost to Stephen Hendry. In the 2007 Grand Prix, he made a 147 against Steve Davis, after having just come out of hospital suffering from gastroenteritis, but still missed out on the last 16, eventually finishing 3rd in his group. He secured the high break and maximum prize, but this event was not televised. In the last 32 of the 2007 Northern Ireland Trophy he held Ronnie O'Sullivan to 4–4, before missing the final blue, allowing O'Sullivan to clinch the frame. Ford made his World Championship debut in 2010, after beating Judd Trump 10–3 in the final qualifying round. He played Mark Allen in the first round, where he lost 4–10.

=== 2010/2011 ===
Early in the season Ford won his first professional title, Event 3 of the Players Tour Championship, beating Jack Lisowski 4–0 in the final while working with sports mentor Matt Andrews. Ford failed to qualify for the main draws of both the Shanghai Masters and the World Open, but did beat Tony Drago and Gerard Greene to reach the Last 32 of the UK Championship. He was drawn against Mark Allen and lost 5–9. Ford did not qualify for the final stages of any other ranking event for the season after losing 8–10 to Liu Chuang in Round 4 of qualifying for the World Championship.

=== 2011/2012 ===
The first world ranking event of the season was the inaugural Australian Goldfields Open, where Ford reached the final stages by beating Gerard Greene. He then beat world number 15 Jamie Cope 5–3 before being whitewashed 0–5 by eventual winner Stuart Bingham in the last 16. He made it through to his third successive UK Championship main draw where he played former world champion Neil Robertson, but was comfortably beaten 1–6. Ford won his second PTC title at Event 11 in December by defeating Martin Gould 4–3. He finished twelfth in the Order of Merit to qualify for the 2012 Finals, where he lost to Mark Davis 1–4 in the last 24. He then qualified for the wildcard round of the German Masters with a 5–0 whitewash of Anthony Hamilton and beat Irishman Philip Arnold 5–1 to reach the last 32, where he met Mark Allen. Ford held a 3–0 lead, but went on to lose the match 4–5. He qualified for the Welsh Open and beat Graeme Dott 4–2 in the opening round, before losing to Stephen Lee 1–4. Ford also reached the second round of the World Open, thanks to the withdrawal of Ronnie O'Sullivan, but exited the tournament in a final frame decider versus Mark King. He then lost to Lee again, this time in the first round of the China Open, before failing to qualify for the World Championship after being edged out 9–10 by Cao Yupeng. Ford finished the season ranked world number 26, meaning he had risen eight places during the year.

=== 2012/2013 ===
Ford qualified for six ranking events during the 2012–13 season. Out of those he lost in the first round in three and in the second round of both the Australian Goldfields Open and Welsh Open to Shaun Murphy 1–5 and Ken Doherty 3–4 respectively. He couldn't qualify for the Players Tour Championship Finals through the Order of Merit as he finished 46th, but he did play in all three of the new Asian PTC's. His best result came in the Third Event, where he lost 3–4 in the semi-finals to Stuart Bingham. Ford finished sixth on the Asian Order of Merit, inside the top eight who qualified for the Finals. It was at the Finals that Ford had his best run in a ranking event of his career. He saw off Martin Gould 4–2, Jack Lisowski 4–3 and Marco Fu 4–1 to advance to the semi-finals. His nerves showed early on against Neil Robertson as he fell 0–3 down, but composed himself to level at 3–3. Ford had three chances to win the deciding frame, but left Robertson a chance when escaping a snooker to lose 3–4. Ford ended the season ranked world number 24.

=== 2013/2014 ===
At the 2013 Australian Goldfields Open Ford reached the quarter-finals of a ranking event for the third time in his career by beating Ryan Day and Barry Hawkins, before losing 3–5 to Robert Milkins. He won through to the second round of both the Indian Open and Welsh Open but was eliminated by Stephen Maguire and James Wattana respectively. Ford defeated James Cahill 10–6, Luca Brecel 10–1 and Matthew Stevens 10–8 to qualify for the World Championship for the second time. He rallied from 6–2 down in the first round against Judd Trump to level at 8–8, before losing two successive frames to exit the tournament.

=== 2014/2015 ===
Ford qualified for the Australian Goldfields Open for the fourth year in a row and lost 3–5 to John Higgins in the first round. He had five defeats in a row after this until beating Barry Pinches 6–4 in the opening round of the UK Championship, his first win in the event after six prior losses. Ford was beaten 3–6 by Joel Walker in the second round. He had a resurgence of form at the Asian Tour event, the Xuzhou Open by knocking out five players to reach the semi-finals, where he lost the last two frames in a 3–4 defeat to Joe Perry. Ford entered the qualifying rounds of the World Championship needing wins to ensure his survival on the tour as he was close to ending the season outside the top 64 in the world rankings. He did so by seeing off Andrew Norman 10–2 and David Gilbert 10–8 to meet Matthew Selt in the final round, where he lost 8–10. Ford ended up 59th in the world rankings, a drop of 27 places during the year.

=== 2015/2016 ===
Ford began the 2015–16 season by reaching the third final carrying ranking points of his career after overcoming the likes of Joe Perry, Matthew Selt and Ben Woollaston at the Riga Open. Ford won the first frame against Barry Hawkins, but could not capture another to be beaten 1–4. At the UK Championship, he defeated Scott Donaldson 6–1 and then beat Mark Williams for the first time by recovering from 3–5 down to win 6–5. He followed that up by easing past Kyren Wilson 6–1, but accused his opponent Liang Wenbo of boring him off the table in the fourth round after it was Ford who lost 5–6 having been 5–3 up. Ford failed to build upon this during the rest of the season as he could not get beyond the second round of any ranking event. However, he was able to build on his world ranking to finish as the world number 43, an increase of 16 spots during the year.

=== 2016/2017 ===
A 4–1 victory over Jamie Jones at the Paul Hunter Classic saw Ford reach the second ranking event semi-final of his career and he beat Thepchaiya Un-Nooh 4–2, closing the match with a 136 break. In Ford's first ranking event final he was 2–2 with Mark Selby, before his fellow Leicester player knocked in two 50 plus breaks to defeat Ford 4–2. At the English Open he beat Rory McLeod, Marco Fu and Joe Swail all by 4–2 scorelines, before losing 1–4 to John Higgins. Ford qualified for the German Masters by ousting Judd Trump 5–1 and then made a 147 in a first round 5–2 win over Peter Ebdon. He saw off Mark King 5–2, but then lost 2–5 to Ali Carter in the quarter-finals. Ford qualified for his third World Championship courtesy of victories over Jamie Bodle, Chris Wakelin and Hossein Vafaei. From holding a narrow 2–1 advantage over Barry Hawkins in the first round, Ford was eliminated 3–10.

=== 2020-Present ===
At the 2022 UK Championship, Ford reached the semi-final where he lost 3‍–‍6 to Ding Junhui. Ford beat Ricky Walden 10‍–‍6 in the first round of the 2024 World Championship, but was then defeated 7‍–‍13 by Judd Trump in the second round. In December 2024, Ford won his first ranking tournament with victory in the Snooker Shoot Out. After beating Wu Yize in the semi-final, he defeated Liam Graham in the final.

== Personal life ==
Ford runs the Pockets Sports Bar in Loughborough, Leicestershire, a personal project he has invested on since 2024.

== Performance and rankings timeline ==
Tournament	2000/ 01	2001/ 02	2002/ 03	2003/ 04	2004/ 05	2005/ 06	2006/ 07	2007/ 08	2008/ 09	2009/ 10	2010/ 11	2011/ 12	2012/ 13	2013/ 14	2014/ 15	2015/ 16	2016/ 17	2017/ 18	2018/ 19	2019/ 20		2020/ 21	2021/ 22	2022/ 23	2023/ 24	2024/ 25	2025/ 26	2026/ 27
Ranking (Note: It shows the ranking at the beginning of the season)	(Note: He was an amateur)	(Note: New players don't have a ranking)			74	51	44	50	48	49	41	34	26	24	32	59	43	33	32	27		24	22	30	22	13	19	36
Ranking tournaments
Championship League	Tournament Not Held							Non-Ranking Event														2R	3R	RR	A	WD	3R	WD
China Open	A	LQ	A	A	1R	LQ	WR	LQ	LQ	LQ	LQ	1R	LQ	LQ	LQ	1R	LQ	QF	LQ	Tournament Not Held								1R
Wuhan Open	Tournament Not Held																								QF	LQ	3R	LQ
British Open	A	LQ	A	2R	LQ	Tournament Not Held																	1R	LQ	QF	LQ	WD	WD
English Open	Tournament Not Held																4R	2R	1R	SF		3R	2R	LQ	1R	1R	2R	1R
Shenzhen Open (Note: The event was called the Xi'an Grand Prix (2024/2025–2025/2026))	Tournament Not Held																									1R	LQ	LQ
Northern Ireland Open	Tournament Not Held																2R	2R	3R	1R		2R	WD	3R	1R	2R	QF	1R
International Championship	Tournament Not Held												LQ	LQ	LQ	1R	2R	2R	2R	QF		Not Held			F	LQ	1R	LQ
UK Championship	A	LQ	A	LQ	1R	LQ	LQ	LQ	LQ	1R	1R	1R	1R	1R	2R	4R	1R	2R	SF	1R		1R	2R	SF	2R	LQ	LQ	
Shoot Out	Tournament Not Held										Non-Ranking Event						1R	4R	2R	1R		1R	1R	QF	1R	W	4R	
Scottish Open (Note: The event was called the Players Championship (2003/2004))	A	LQ	A	LQ	Tournament Not Held								MR	Not Held			1R	4R	1R	3R		2R	2R	LQ	QF	QF	1R	
German Masters	Tournament Not Held										LQ	1R	LQ	1R	LQ	A	QF	1R	LQ	1R		SF	2R	F	3R	3R	2R	LQ
Welsh Open	A	LQ	A	LQ	1R	LQ	LQ	LQ	LQ	1R	LQ	2R	2R	2R	1R	2R	1R	2R	2R	2R		QF	LQ	LQ	3R	3R	1R	
World Grand Prix	Tournament Not Held														NR	2R	1R	DNQ	2R	SF		DNQ	QF	1R	2R	1R	DNQ	
Players Championship (Note: The event was called the Players Tour Championship Grand Final (2010/2011–2015/2016))	Tournament Not Held										1R	1R	SF	DNQ	DNQ	1R	DNQ	DNQ	DNQ	DNQ		DNQ	DNQ	1R	1R	DNQ	DNQ	
World Open (Note: The event was called the Grand Prix (2000/2001 and 2004/2005–2009/2010) and the LG Cup (2001/2002–2003/2004))	A	LQ	A	LQ	LQ	1R	RR	RR	LQ	LQ	LQ	2R	LQ	1R	Not Held		2R	1R	1R	LQ		Not Held			1R	QF	LQ	
Tour Championship	Tournament Not Held																		DNQ	DNQ		DNQ	DNQ	DNQ	1R	DNQ	DNQ	
World Championship	LQ	LQ	LQ	LQ	LQ	LQ	LQ	LQ	LQ	1R	LQ	LQ	LQ	1R	LQ	LQ	1R	LQ	LQ	1R		LQ	LQ	LQ	2R	LQ	LQ	
Non-ranking tournaments
Shanghai Masters	Tournament Not Held							Ranking Event											A	A		Not Held			A	1R	A	
Champion of Champions	Tournament Not Held													A	A	A	A	A	A	A		A	A	A	A	A	1R	
The Masters	A	LQ	LQ	LQ	A	LQ	LQ	LQ	A	WD	A	A	A	A	A	A	A	A	A	A		A	A	A	A	A	A	
Championship League	Tournament Not Held							A	A	A	A	RR	RR	RR	A	A	A	RR	RR	RR	2R	RR	RR	RR	RR	RR	2R	
Former ranking tournaments
Thailand Masters	A	LQ	NR	Not Held			NR	Tournament Not Held																				
Irish Masters	Non-Ranking		A	LQ	LQ	NH	NR	Tournament Not Held																				
Northern Ireland Trophy	Tournament Not Held					NR	LQ	2R	LQ	Tournament Not Held																		
Bahrain Championship	Tournament Not Held								LQ	Tournament Not Held																		
Wuxi Classic (Note: The event ran under the name Jiangsu Classic (2008/2009–2009/2010))	Tournament Not Held								Non-Ranking Event				1R	LQ	LQ	Tournament Not Held												
Australian Goldfields Open	Tournament Not Held											2R	2R	QF	1R	LQ	Tournament Not Held											
Shanghai Masters	Tournament Not Held							LQ	1R	LQ	LQ	LQ	1R	LQ	LQ	1R	LQ	1R	Non-Ranking			Not Held			Non-Ranking Event			
Paul Hunter Classic (Note: The event was called the Grand Prix Fürth (2004/2005) and the Fürth German Open (2005/2006–2006/2007))	Tournament Not Held				Pro-am Event						Minor-Ranking Event						F	4R	3R	NR		Tournament Not Held						
Indian Open	Tournament Not Held													2R	1R	NH	LQ	1R	1R	Tournament Not Held								
Riga Masters (Note: The event was called the Riga Open (2014/2015–2015/2016))	Tournament Not Held														Minor-Rank		1R	1R	LQ	2R		Tournament Not Held						
China Championship	Tournament Not Held																NR	3R	2R	1R		Tournament Not Held						
WST Pro Series	Tournament Not Held																					RR	Tournament Not Held					
Turkish Masters	Tournament Not Held																						2R	Tournament Not Held				
Gibraltar Open	Tournament Not Held															MR	2R	2R	2R	4R		3R	4R	Tournament Not Held				
WST Classic	Tournament Not Held																							1R	Tournament Not Held			
European Masters (Note: The event was called the Malta Cup (2004/2005–2007/2008))	NH	LQ	A	LQ	QF	LQ	2R	NR	Tournament Not Held								2R	LQ	LQ	LQ		4R	QF	LQ	2R	Not Held		
Saudi Arabia Masters	Tournament Not Held																									5R	3R	NH
Former non-ranking tournaments
Masters Qualifying Event (Note: The event was called the Benson & Hedges Championship (2000/2001–2002/2003))	A	LQ	LQ	LQ	NH	1R	2R	1R	A	1R	Tournament Not Held																	
General Cup (Note: The event was called the General Cup International (2004/2005–2011/2012))	Tournament Not Held				A	Tournament Not Held				A	NH	RR	A	A	A	A	Tournament Not Held											
Shoot Out	Tournament Not Held										2R	SF	1R	2R	3R	2R	Ranking Event											
Six-red World Championship (Note: The event was called the Six-red Snooker International (2008/2009) and the Six-red World Grand Prix (2009/2010))	Tournament Not Held								2R	A	A	NH	3R	A	A	A	A	RR	QF	A		Not Held		SF	Tournament Not Held			
Haining Open	Tournament Not Held														Minor-Rank		4R	F	A	A		NH	A	A	Tournament Not Held			

Performance Table Legend
LQ	lost in the qualifying draw	#R	lost in the early rounds of the tournament (WR = Wildcard round, RR = Round robin)	QF	lost in the quarter-finals
SF	lost in the semi-finals	F	lost in the final	W	won the tournament
DNQ	did not qualify for the tournament	A	did not participate in the tournament	WD	withdrew from the tournament

NH / Not Held	means an event was not held.
NR / Non-Ranking Event	means an event is/was no longer a ranking event.
R / Ranking Event	means an event is/was a ranking event.
MR / Minor-Ranking Event	means an event is/was a minor-ranking event.
PA / Pro-am Event	means an event is/was a pro-am event.

== Career finals ==
=== Ranking finals: 4 (1 title) ===
Outcome	No.	Year	Championship	Opponent in the final	Score
Runner-up	1.	2016	Paul Hunter Classic	(England) Mark Selby	2–4
Runner-up	2.	2023	German Masters	(England) Ali Carter	3–10
Runner-up	3.	2023	International Championship	(China) Zhang Anda	6–10
Winner	1.	2024	Snooker Shoot Out	(Scotland) Liam Graham	1–0

=== Minor-ranking finals: 3 (2 titles) ===
Outcome	No.	Year	Championship	Opponent in the final	Score
Winner	1.	2010	Players Tour Championship – Event 3	(England) Jack Lisowski	4–0
Winner	2.	2011	Players Tour Championship – Event 11	(England) Martin Gould	4–3
Runner-up	1.	2015	Riga Open	(England) Barry Hawkins	1–4

=== Non-ranking finals: 2 ===
Outcome	No.	Year	Championship	Opponent in the final	Score
Runner-up	1.	2002	Challenge Tour - Event 1	(England) Chris Melling	2–6
Runner-up	2.	2017	Haining Open	(England) Mark Selby	1–5

=== Pro-am finals: 1 (1 title) ===
Outcome	No.	Year	Championship	Opponent in the final	Score
Winner	1.	2007	Austrian Open	(England) Stephen Lee	5–4

=== Amateur finals: 2 (2 titles) ===
Outcome	No.	Year	Championship	Opponent in the final	Score
Winner	1.	1997	English Under-15 Championship	(England) Stuart Roper	4–0
Winner	2.	2001	English Under-18 Championship	(England) Judd Trump	5–1
