= 1999 Millennium Cup =

Millennium Cup
Tournament information
- Dates: 23–25 July 1999
- Venue: Regent Hotel
- City: Hong Kong
- Country: Hong Kong
- Organisation: WPBSA
- Format: Non-Ranking event
- Total prize fund: Unknown
- Winner's share: £50,000
- Highest break: Stephen Hendry (SCO) (131)

Final
- Champion: Stephen Lee (ENG)
- Runner-up: Ronnie O'Sullivan (ENG)
- Score: 7–2

The Millennium Cup was a professional invitational snooker tournament, which took place from 23 to 25 July 1999. The tournament was played at the Regent Hotel in Hong Kong, and featured eight players.

Stephen Lee won the second title of his professional career, beating Ronnie O'Sullivan 7–2 in the final after taking a 5–0 lead. Lee received £50,000 as winner.

== Main draw ==
Results were as follows.

Quarter-finals; Best of 9 frames
(England) Ronnie O'Sullivan	5
(Hong Kong) Chan Wok Ming	2
(Wales) Mark Williams	5
(Hong Kong) Chan Wai Tat	1
(England) Stephen Lee	5
(Hong Kong) Marco Fu	0
(Hong Kong) Wang Tik Fan	2
(Scotland) Stephen Hendry	5

Semi-finals; Best of 11 frames
(England) Ronnie O'Sullivan	6
(Wales) Mark Williams	5
(England) Stephen Lee	6
(Scotland) Stephen Hendry	1

Final; Best of 13 frames
(England) Ronnie O'Sullivan	2
(England) Stephen Lee	7

== Final ==
Final: Best of 13 frames. Regent Hotel, Hong Kong, 25 July 1999.
Ronnie O'Sullivan; England	2–7	Stephen Lee; England
29–53, 48–73(60), 26–90(61), 33–58(57), 12–53(53), 69–32, 44–59, 89(89)–8, –85(84)1
89	Highest break	84
0	Century breaks	0
1	50+ breaks	5

== Century breaks ==
- 131 – Stephen Hendry
- 104 – Ronnie O'Sullivan
