= 2000 Masters (snooker) =

Professional non-ranking snooker tournament, Feb 2000

2000 Benson & Hedges Masters
Tournament information
- Dates: 6–13 February 2000
- Venue: Wembley Conference Centre
- City: London
- Country: England
- Organisation: WPBSA
- Format: Non-ranking event
- Total prize fund: £615,000
- Winner's share: £165,000
- Highest break: Ken Doherty (IRL) (140)

Final
- Champion: Matthew Stevens (WAL)
- Runner-up: Ken Doherty (IRL)
- Score: 10–8

The 2000 Masters (officially the 2000 Benson & Hedges Masters) was a professional non-ranking snooker tournament that took place between 6 and 13 February 2000 at the Wembley Conference Centre in London, England.

Matthew Stevens won the title on his second attempt after 1996 by defeating Ken Doherty, who had made his second final in a row, 10–8. On the 15th frame of the final, Doherty attempted a maximum break, but he missed the final black at 140. This was the highest break of the tournament.

== Field ==
Defending champion John Higgins was the number 1 seed with World Champion Stephen Hendry seeded 2. Places were allocated to the top 16 players in the world rankings. Players seeded 15 and 16 played in the wild-card round against the winner of the qualifying event, Ali Carter (ranked 142), and Marco Fu (ranked 35), who was the wild-card selection. Ali Carter, Marco Fu and Fergal O'Brien were making their debuts in the Masters.

== Wild-card round ==
In the preliminary round, the wild-card players plays the 15th and 16th seeds:

| Match | Date | | Score | |
|---|---|---|---|---|
| WC1 | Monday 7 February | Steve Davis (ENG) (15) | 5–6 | Ali Carter (ENG) |
| WC2 | Sunday 6 February | Jimmy White (ENG) (16) | 6–3 | Marco Fu (HKG) |

== Main draw ==
Last 16; Best of 11 frames
1 | John Higgins (SCO) | 4
16 | Jimmy White (ENG) | 6
8 | Alan McManus (SCO) | 2
9 | Matthew Stevens (WAL) | 6
5 | John Parrott (ENG) | 6
12 | Paul Hunter (ENG) | 3
4 | Ronnie O'Sullivan (ENG) | 6
10 | Anthony Hamilton (ENG) | 4
3 | Mark Williams (WAL) | 6
13 | Peter Ebdon (ENG) | 3
6 | Stephen Lee (ENG) | 6
11 | Fergal O'Brien (IRL) | 4
7 | Ken Doherty (IRL) | 6
Ali Carter (ENG) | 0
2 | Stephen Hendry (SCO) | 6
14 | Mark King (ENG) | 3

Quarter-finals; Best of 11 frames
16 | (England) Jimmy White | 3
9 | (Wales) Matthew Stevens | 6
5 | (England) John Parrott | 6
4 | (England) Ronnie O'Sullivan | 3
3 | (Wales) Mark Williams | 4
6 | (England) Stephen Lee | 6
7 | (Republic of Ireland) Ken Doherty | 6
2 | (Scotland) Stephen Hendry | 3

Semi-finals; Best of 11 frames
9 | (Wales) Matthew Stevens | 6
5 | (England) John Parrott | 2
6 | (England) Stephen Lee | 0
7 | (Republic of Ireland) Ken Doherty | 6

Final; Best of 19 frames
9 | (Wales) Matthew Stevens | 10
7 | (Republic of Ireland) Ken Doherty | 8

=== Final ===
Final: Best of 19 frames. Referee: Alan Chamberlain; Wembley Conference Centre, London, England, 13 February 2000.
| Matthew Stevens (9); Wales | 10–8 | Ken Doherty (7); Ireland |
Afternoon: 126–4 (118), 61–51 (Stevens 50), 50–68, 96–0 (96), 85–22 (65), 87–0 (87), 2–102 (78), 59–70; Evening: 122–0 (122), 17–83 (60), 72–47 (56), 9–96, 58–14, 78–34 (61), 0–144 (140), 22–82, 0–85 (85), 101–1 (63)
| 122 | Highest break | 140 |
| 2 | Century breaks | 1 |
| 9 | 50+ breaks | 4 |

== Qualifying ==
Ali Carter won the qualifying tournament, known as the 1999 Benson & Hedges Championship at the time. Karl Burrows made his only maximum break against Adrian Rosa.

== Century breaks ==
Total: 13

- 140, 118, 104 – Ken Doherty
- 137, 106, 104 – Stephen Hendry
- 126, 113 – Ronnie O'Sullivan
- 122, 118 – Matthew Stevens
- 117 – Jimmy White
- 112 – Anthony Hamilton
- 101 – Stephen Lee

Jimmy White's century was scored in the wild-card round.
