= 2012 German Masters =

2012 PartyPoker.net German Masters
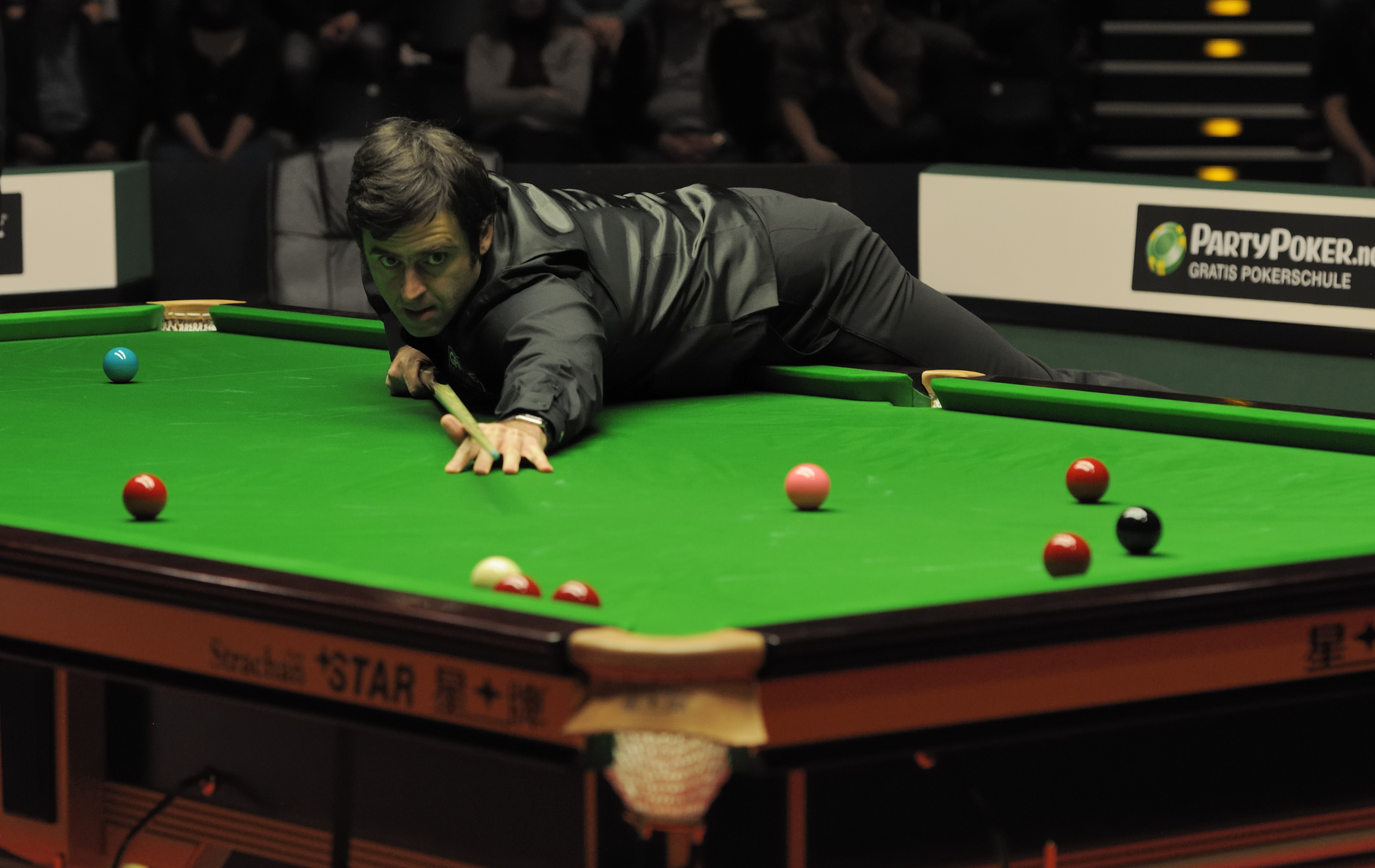

Tournament information
- Dates: 1–5 February 2012
- Venue: Tempodrom
- City: Berlin
- Country: Germany
- Organisation: World Snooker
- Format: Ranking event
- Total prize fund: €280,000
- Winner's share: €50,000
- Highest break: Stephen Maguire (SCO) (130)

Final
- Champion: Ronnie O'Sullivan (ENG)
- Runner-up: Stephen Maguire (SCO)
- Score: 9–7

The 2012 German Masters (officially the 2012 PartyPoker.net German Masters) was a professional ranking snooker tournament that took place between 1–5 February 2012 at the Tempodrom in Berlin, Germany. This was the first time that PartyPoker.net sponsored the event.

Mike Dunn made the 79th official maximum break during his round 1 qualifying match against Kurt Maflin. This was Dunn's first 147 break. Stephen Hendry missed the final stage of a ranking event for the first time in 15 years after losing 1–5 to James Wattana in the final qualifying round.

Mark Williams was the defending champion, but he lost in the quarter-finals 3–5 against Stephen Lee.

Ronnie O'Sullivan won his 23rd ranking title by defeating Stephen Maguire 9–7 in the final.

== Prize fund ==
The breakdown of prize money for this year is shown below:

- Winner: €50,000
- Runner-up: €30,000
- Semi-final: €15,000
- Quarter-final: €9,000
- Last 16: €6,000
- Last 32: €3,750
- Last 48: €1,500
- Stage two highest break: €2,000
- Total: €280,000

== Wildcard round ==
These matches were played in Berlin on 1 February 2012.

| Match | | Score | |
|---|---|---|---|
| WC1 | Ken Doherty (IRL) | 5–1 | Patrick Einsle (GER) |
| WC2 | Adrian Gunnell (ENG) | 5–3 | Peter Bullen (BEL) |
| WC3 | Yu Delu (CHN) | 5–3 | Chris Norbury (ENG) |
| WC4 | Mike Dunn (ENG) | 3–5 | Craig Steadman (ENG) |
| WC5 | Liu Song (CHN) | 5–0 | Soner Sari (TUR) |
| WC6 | James Wattana (THA) | w/o–w/d | Mario Wehrmann (NLD) |
| WC7 | Paul Davison (ENG) | 5–2 | Krzysztof Wróbel (POL) |
| WC8 | Tom Ford (ENG) | 5–1 | Philip Arnold (IRL) |

== Main draw ==
Last 32; Best of 9 frames
1 | Mark Williams (WAL) | 5
Ken Doherty (IRL) | 0
11 | Stuart Bingham (ENG) | 5
Peter Ebdon (ENG) | 3
13 | Stephen Lee (ENG) | 5
Adrian Gunnell (ENG) | 2
5 | Ding Junhui (CHN) | 3
Yu Delu (CHN) | 5
7 | Ali Carter (ENG) | 4
Joe Perry (ENG) | 5
14 | Ronnie O'Sullivan (ENG) | 5
Andrew Higginson (ENG) | 4
15 | Matthew Stevens (WAL) | 5
Craig Steadman (ENG) | 1
4 | Neil Robertson (AUS) | 5
Marcus Campbell (SCO) | 2
3 | Mark Selby (ENG) | 5
Liu Song (CHN) | 0
10 | Graeme Dott (SCO) | 5
James Wattana (THA) | 0
16 | Martin Gould (ENG) | 1
Ricky Walden (ENG) | 5
6 | Shaun Murphy (ENG) | 5
Barry Hawkins (ENG) | 4
8 | Judd Trump (ENG) | 5
Paul Davison (ENG) | 1
12 | Mark Allen (NIR) | 5
Tom Ford (ENG) | 4
9 | Stephen Maguire (SCO) | 5
Ryan Day (WAL) | 1
2 | John Higgins (SCO) | 5
Mark Davis (ENG) | 1

Last 16; Best of 9 frames
1 | (Wales) Mark Williams | 5
11 | (England) Stuart Bingham | 2
13 | (England) Stephen Lee | 5
(China) Yu Delu | 2
(England) Joe Perry | 1
14 | (England) Ronnie O'Sullivan | 5
15 | (Wales) Matthew Stevens | 5
4 | (Australia) Neil Robertson | 1
3 | (England) Mark Selby | 5
10 | (Scotland) Graeme Dott | 3
(England) Ricky Walden | 2
6 | (England) Shaun Murphy | 5
8 | (England) Judd Trump | 5
12 | (Northern Ireland) Mark Allen | 2
9 | (Scotland) Stephen Maguire | 5
2 | (Scotland) John Higgins | 0

Quarter-finals; Best of 9 frames
1 | (Wales) Mark Williams | 3
13 | (England) Stephen Lee | 5
14 | (England) Ronnie O'Sullivan | 5
15 | (Wales) Matthew Stevens | 3
3 | (England) Mark Selby | 3
6 | (England) Shaun Murphy | 5
8 | (England) Judd Trump | 4
9 | (Scotland) Stephen Maguire | 5

Semi-finals; Best of 11 frames
13 | (England) Stephen Lee | 4
14 | (England) Ronnie O'Sullivan | 6
6 | (England) Shaun Murphy | 0
9 | (Scotland) Stephen Maguire | 6

Final; Best of 17 frames
14 | (England) Ronnie O'Sullivan | 9
9 | (Scotland) Stephen Maguire | 7

== Final ==
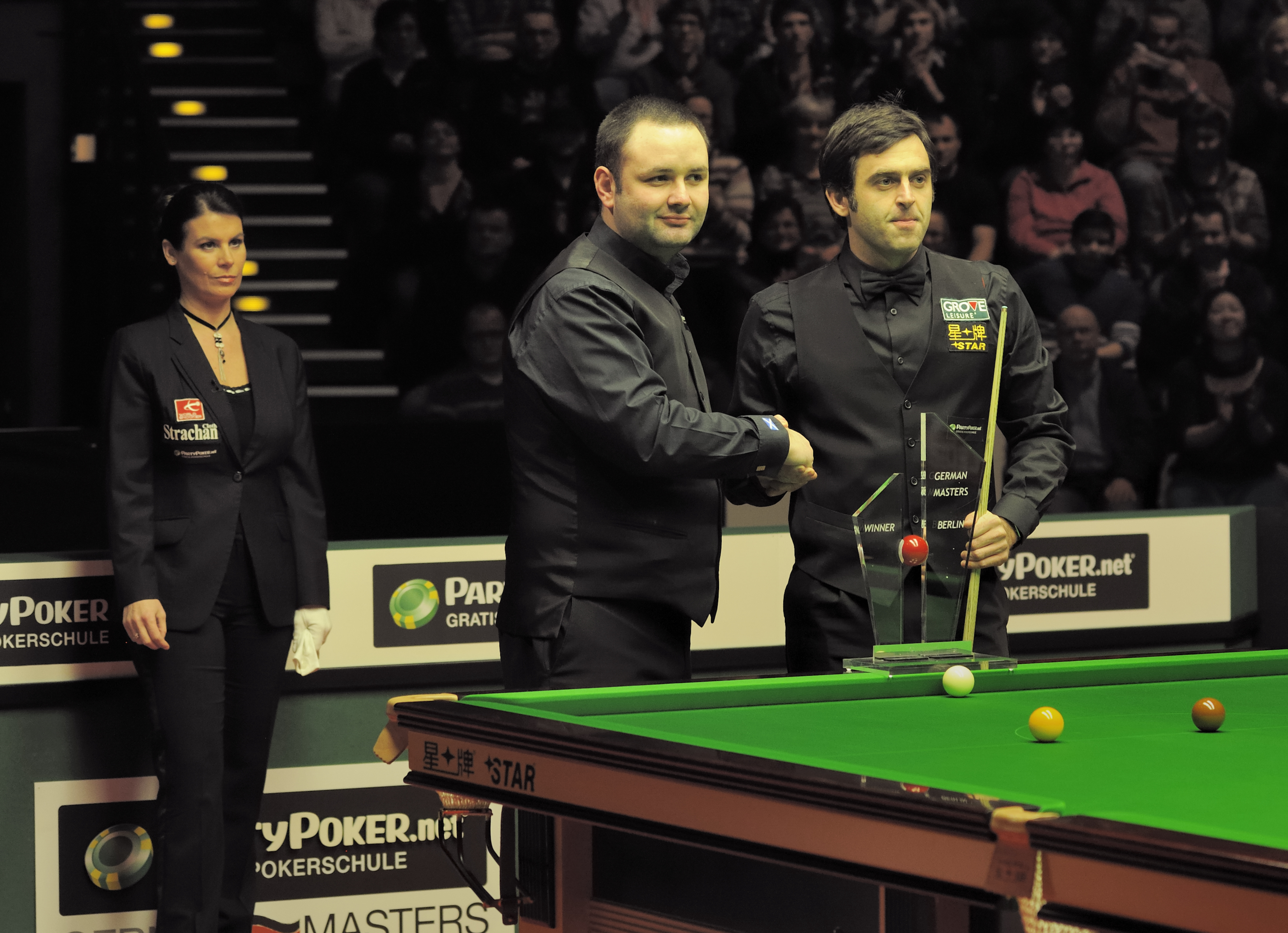
Ronnie O’Sullivan and Stephen Maguire behind the trophy before the last session of the final. In the background the referee Michaela Tabb.

Final: Best of 17 frames. Referee: Michaela Tabb. Tempodrom, Berlin, Germany, 5 February 2012.
| Ronnie O'Sullivan (14); England | 9–7 | Stephen Maguire (9); Scotland |
Afternoon: 111–26 (111), 0–130 (130), 8–106 (106), 5–132 (128), 58–73 (O'Sullivan 58), 63–8, 20–69 (55), 75–24 (75); Evening: 0–115 (69), 89–47 (89), 78–0 (54), 68–59 (Maguire 52), 94–37 (67), 75–31, 43–82 (82), 66–41
| 111 | Highest break | 130 |
| 1 | Century breaks | 3 |
| 6 | 50+ breaks | 7 |

== Qualifying ==
These matches were held between 21 and 25 November 2011 at the World Snooker Academy, Sheffield, England. Matches were over 9 frames.

=== Preliminary round ===
| Lucky Vatnani (IND) | 2–5 | Dechawat Poomjaeng (THA) |

| Daniel Wells (WAL) | 1–5 | Luca Brecel (BEL) |

=== Round 1 ===
| Mark Joyce (ENG) | 4–5 | David Grace (ENG) |
| Jack Lisowski (ENG) | 1–5 | Sam Craigie (ENG) |
| Joe Jogia (ENG) | 4–5 | Stuart Carrington (ENG) |
| Jimmy White (ENG) | 5–3 | Matthew Couch (ENG) |
| Jimmy Robertson (ENG) | w/o–w/d | Bjorn Haneveer (BEL) |
| Adrian Gunnell (ENG) | 5–1 | Sam Baird (ENG) |
| Alfie Burden (ENG) | 5–2 | Scott MacKenzie (SCO) |
| Barry Pinches (ENG) | 4–5 | Yu Delu (CHN) |
| Robert Milkins (ENG) | 5–0 | Tian Pengfei (CHN) |
| Steve Davis (ENG) | 5– 3 | Joe Meara (NIR) |
| Ben Woollaston (ENG) | 5–1 | Rod Lawler (ENG) |
| Jamie Jones (WAL) | 5–2 | Andrew Norman (ENG) |
| Tony Drago (MLT) | 2–5 | Adam Wicheard (ENG) |
| Mike Dunn (ENG) | 5–0 | Kurt Maflin (NOR) |
| Jamie Burnett (SCO) | 5–2 | (Thailand) Dechawat Poomjaeng |
| Peter Lines (ENG) | 5–2 | Simon Bedford (ENG) |

| Rory McLeod (ENG) | 5–2 | Kacper Filipiak (POL) |
| Liu Song (CHN) | 5–3 | Liam Highfield (ENG) |
| Nigel Bond (ENG) | 1–5 | Andrew Pagett (WAL) |
| James Wattana (THA) | 5–3 | Passakorn Suwannawat (THA) |
| Liu Chuang (CHN) | 5–3 | Ian McCulloch (ENG) |
| Liang Wenbo (CHN) | 5–3 | Aditya Mehta (IND) |
| Alan McManus (SCO) | w/o–w/d | Robin Hull (FIN) |
| Andy Hicks (ENG) | 5–2 | Cao Yupeng (CHN) |
| Gerard Greene (NIR) | 2–5 | David Morris (IRL) |
| Matthew Selt (ENG) | 4–5 | Paul Davison (ENG) |
| Anthony Hamilton (ENG) | 5–3 | David Hogan (IRL) |
| Joe Swail (NIR) | 5–1 | (Belgium) Luca Brecel |
| Dave Harold (ENG) | 3–5 | Adam Duffy (ENG) |
| Anthony McGill (SCO) | 5–3 | Li Yan (CHN) |
| Michael Holt (ENG) | 2–5 | Michael White (WAL) |
| Xiao Guodong (CHN) | 5–3 | David Gilbert (ENG) |

=== Round 2 ===
| (England) David Grace | 2–5 | (England) Sam Craigie |
| (England) Stuart Carrington | 3–5 | (England) Jimmy White |
| (England) Jimmy Robertson | 0–5 | (England) Adrian Gunnell |
| (England) Alfie Burden | 2–5 | (China) Yu Delu |
| (England) Robert Milkins | 5–1 | (England) Steve Davis |
| (England) Ben Woollaston | 2–5 | (Wales) Jamie Jones |
| (England) Adam Wicheard | 0–5 | (England) Mike Dunn |
| (Scotland) Jamie Burnett | 3–5 | (England) Peter Lines |

| (England) Rory McLeod | 3–5 | (China) Liu Song |
| (Wales) Andrew Pagett | 1–5 | (Thailand) James Wattana |
| (China) Liu Chuang | 5–3 | (China) Liang Wenbo |
| (Scotland) Alan McManus | 4–5 | (England) Andy Hicks |
| (Republic of Ireland) David Morris | 3–5 | (England) Paul Davison |
| (England) Anthony Hamilton | 5–4 | (Northern Ireland) Joe Swail |
| (England) Adam Duffy | 4–5 | (Scotland) Anthony McGill |
| (Wales) Michael White | 5–2 | (China) Xiao Guodong |

=== Round 3 ===
| Ken Doherty (IRL) | 5–4 | (England) Sam Craigie |
| Peter Ebdon (ENG) | 5–4 | (England) Jimmy White |
| Marco Fu (HKG) | 1–5 | (England) Adrian Gunnell |
| Jamie Cope (ENG) | 3–5 | (China) Yu Delu |
| Joe Perry (ENG) | 5–3 | (England) Robert Milkins |
| Andrew Higginson (ENG) | 5–2 | (Wales) Jamie Jones |
| Mark King (ENG) | 3–5 | (England) Mike Dunn |
| Marcus Campbell (SCO) | 5–3 | (England) Peter Lines |

| Fergal O'Brien (IRL) | 4–5 | (China) Liu Song |
| Stephen Hendry (SCO) | 1–5 | (Thailand) James Wattana |
| Ricky Walden (ENG) | 5–1 | (China) Liu Chuang |
| Barry Hawkins (ENG) | 5–4 | (England) Andy Hicks |
| Dominic Dale (WAL) | 4–5 | (England) Paul Davison |
| Tom Ford (ENG) | 5–0 | (England) Anthony Hamilton |
| Ryan Day (WAL) | 5–4 | (Scotland) Anthony McGill |
| Mark Davis (ENG) | 5–2 | (Wales) Michael White |

== Century breaks ==
=== Qualifying stage centuries ===
- 147 – Mike Dunn
- 143, 100, 100 – Michael White
- 137, 102 – Jamie Jones
- 137 – Adam Duffy
- 135 – Ken Doherty
- 133 – Stuart Carrington
- 131, 101 – Liu Song
- 126 – David Gilbert
- 124, 120 – Jimmy White
- 123 – Liang Wenbo
- 122 – Passakorn Suwannawat
- 121 – Adam Wicheard
- 120, 115 – Ryan Day
- 117, 100 – Xiao Guodong
- 116 – Andy Hicks
- 112, 108 – Jamie Burnett
- 112, 101 – Mark Davis
- 111, 107 – Anthony Hamilton
- 111 – Mark Joyce
- 110 – Andrew Higginson
- 109, 100 – Yu Delu
- 104 – Anthony McGill
- 103 – Sam Craigie
- 103 – Joe Perry
- 102 – Paul Davison
- 102 – James Wattana

=== Televised stage centuries ===
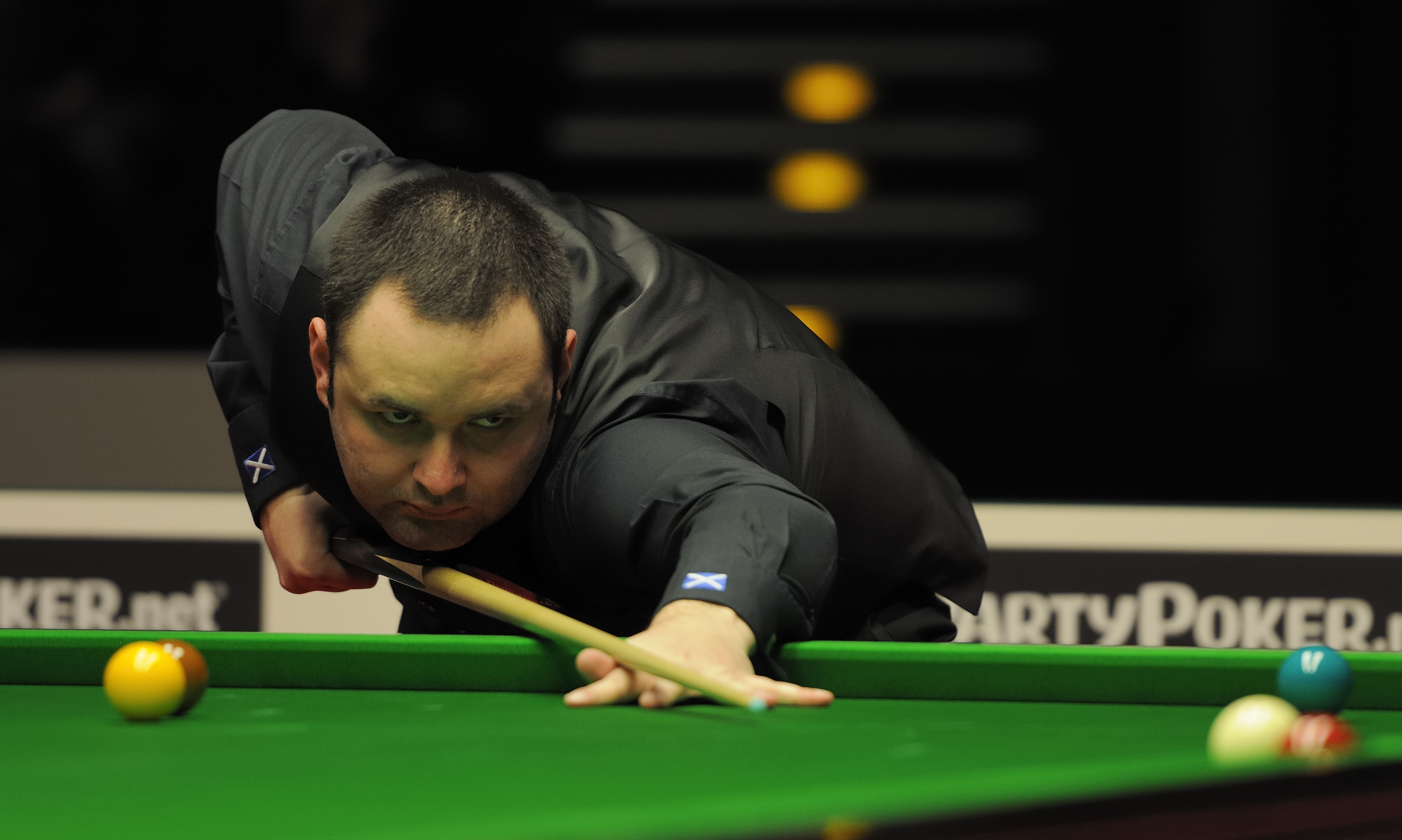
Stephen Maguire played the highest century of the televised stage with 130.

- 130, 128, 106, 100 – Stephen Maguire
- 129 – Ali Carter
- 128 – Stuart Bingham
- 128 – Shaun Murphy
- 123, 111, 110 – Ronnie O'Sullivan
- 113 – Barry Hawkins
- 111, 104 – Mark Selby
- 111 – Judd Trump
- 109 – Peter Ebdon
- 107 – Mark Williams
- 102 – Mike Dunn
- 102 – Joe Perry
- 102 – Ricky Walden
- 101 – Stephen Lee
- 100 – Tom Ford

== Gallery ==
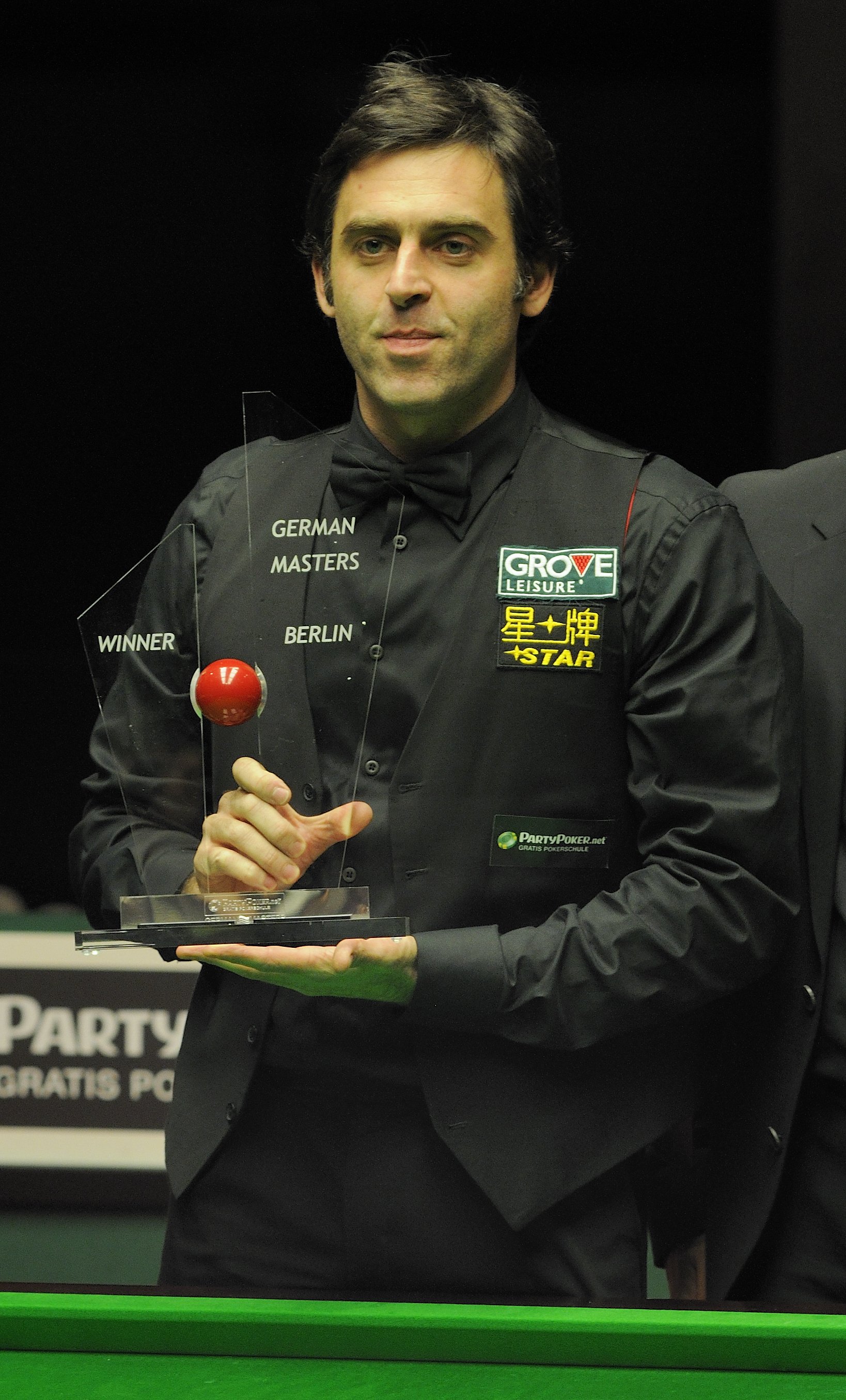
Winner Ronnie O'Sullivan with the trophy.

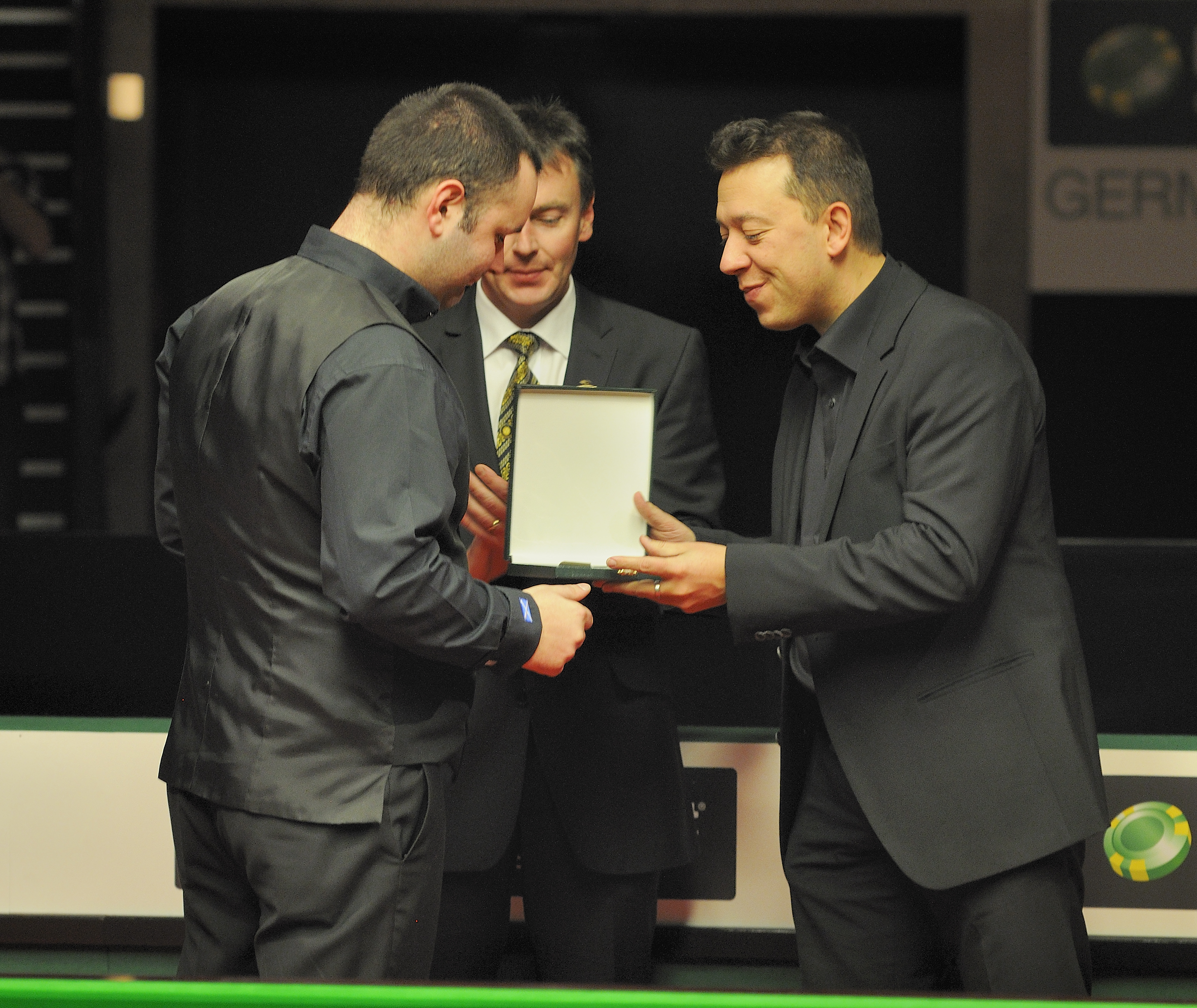
Runner-up Stephen Maguire getting his award.

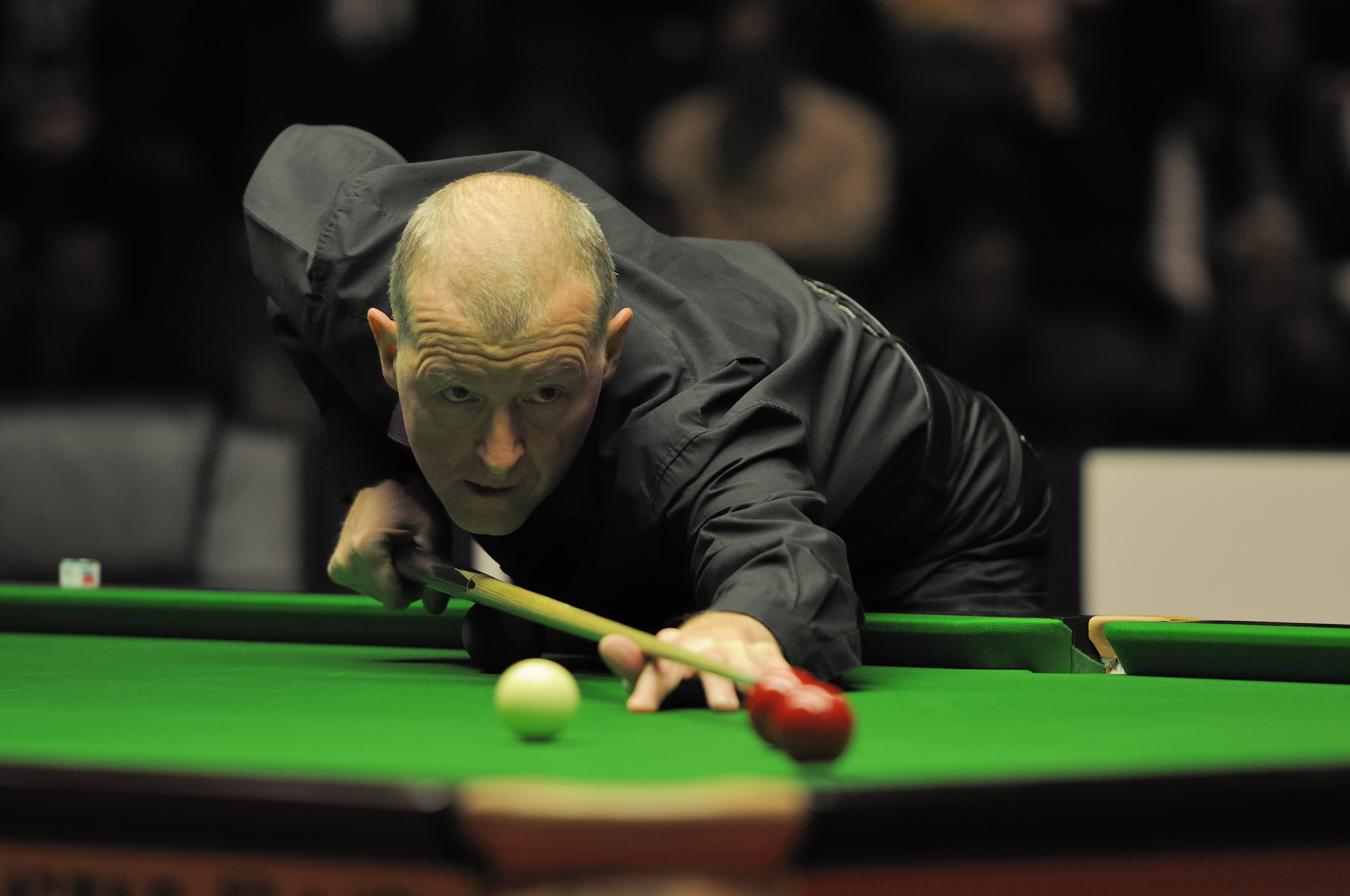
Steve Davis playing a trick shot exhibition during the break of the final

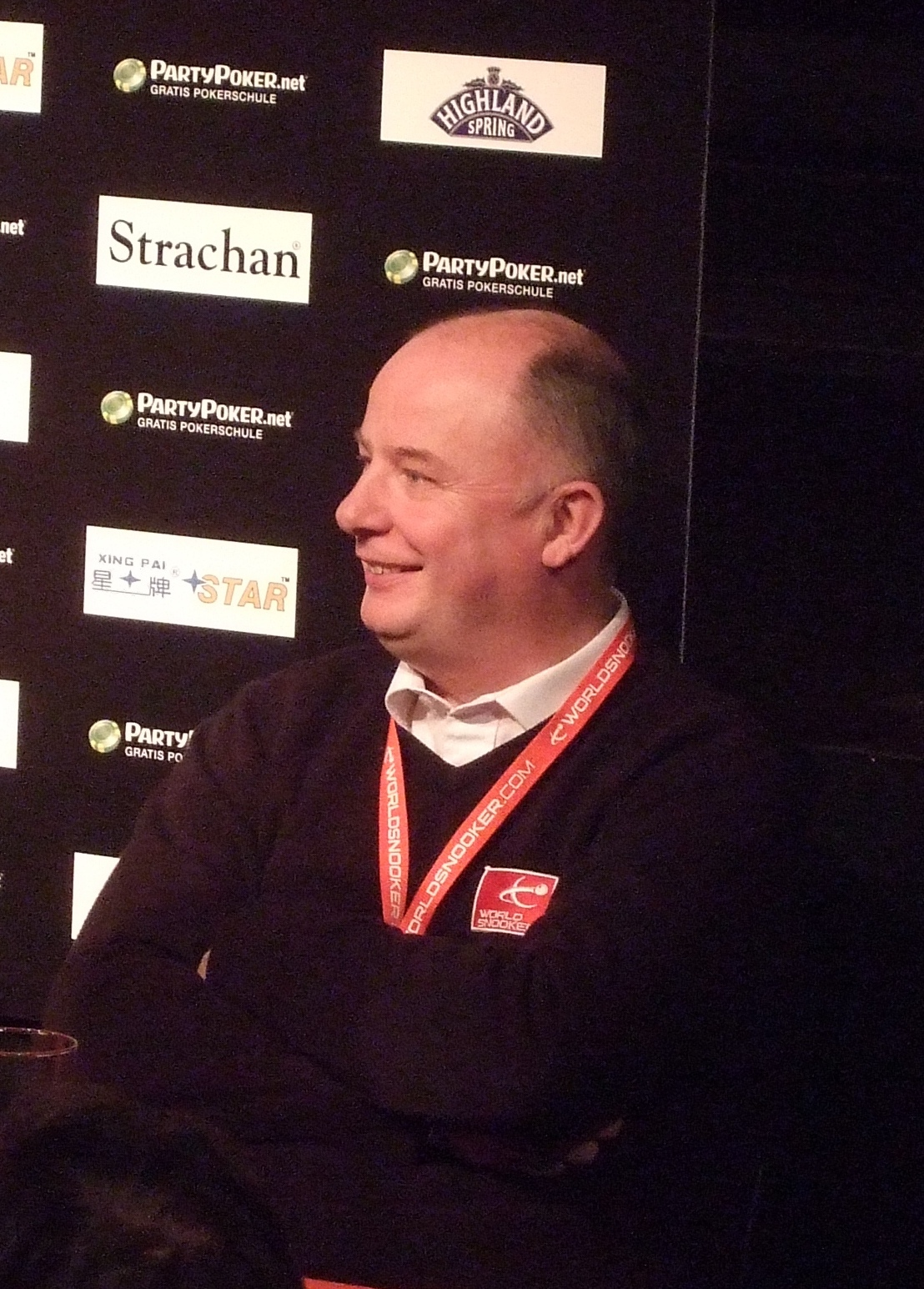
Tournament director Mike Ganley

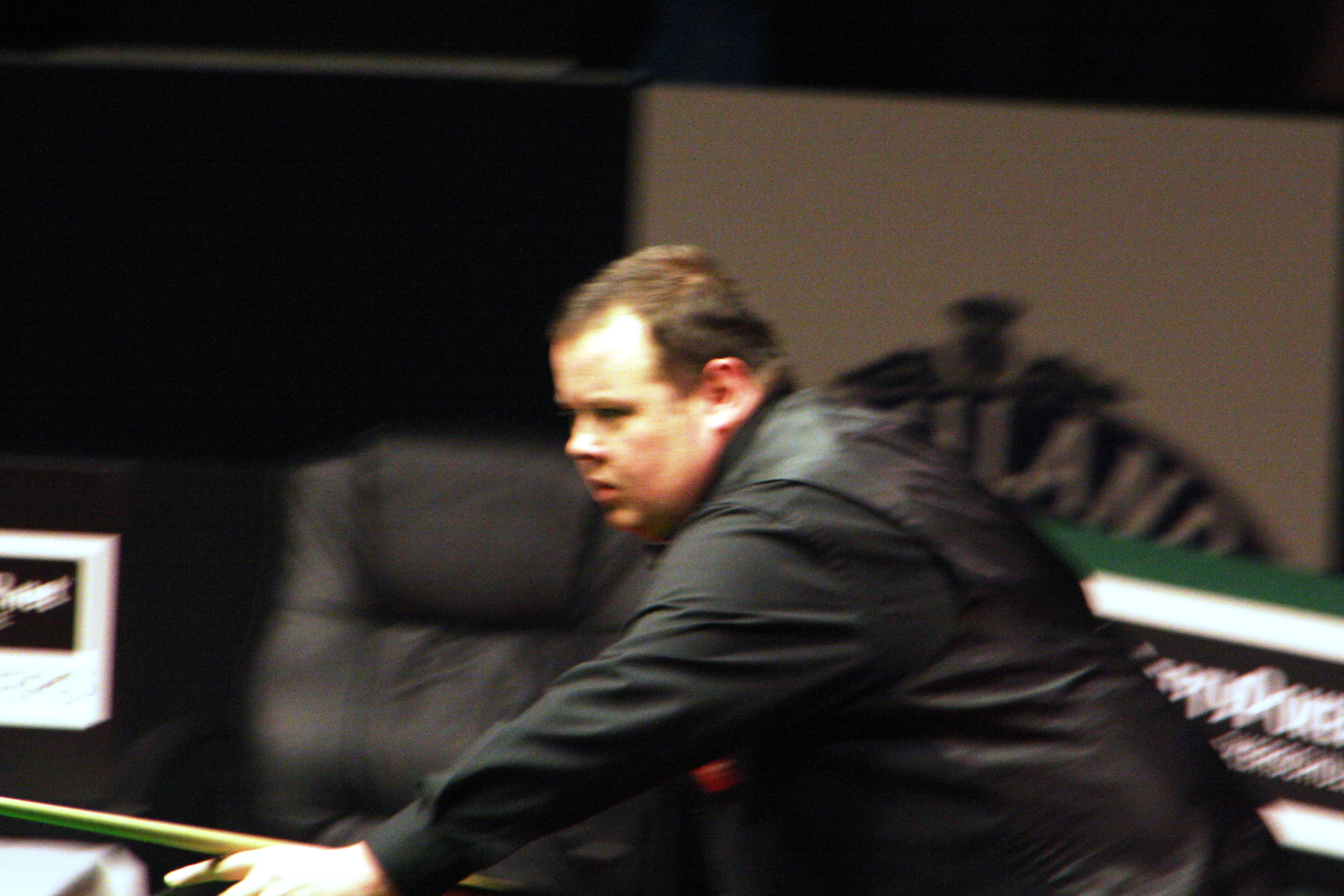
Stephen Lee was the semi-final opponent of O'Sullivan
