= 2000 Irish Masters =

Irish Masters
Tournament information
- Dates: 21–26 March 2000
- Venue: Goffs
- City: Kill
- Country: Ireland
- Organisation: WPBSA
- Format: Non-Ranking event

Final
- Champion: (Scotland) John Higgins
- Runner-up: (Scotland) Stephen Hendry
- Score: 9–4

The 2000 Irish Masters was the twenty-sixth edition of the professional invitational snooker tournament, which took place from 21 to 26 March 2000. The tournament was played at Goffs in Kill, County Kildare, and featured twelve professional players.

John Higgins won the tournament for the first time, defeating Stephen Hendry 9‍–‍4 in the final. Higgins made a 147, the second maximum of his career in his quarter‑final win against Jimmy White.

== Main draw ==
Round 1 Best of 11 frames
(England) Jimmy White	6
(England) Stephen Lee	4
(Wales) Matthew Stevens	6
(Republic of Ireland) Ken Doherty	4
(Scotland) Alan McManus	6
(Republic of Ireland) Fergal O'Brien	4
(England) John Parrott	6
(England) Steve Davis	1

Quarter-finals; Best of 11 frames
(Scotland) John Higgins	6
(England) Jimmy White	4
(England) Ronnie O'Sullivan	6
(Wales) Matthew Stevens	4
(Scotland) Stephen Hendry	6
(Scotland) Alan McManus	2
(England) John Parrott	6
(Wales) Mark Williams	3

Semi-finals; Best of 11 frames
(Scotland) John Higgins	6
(England) Ronnie O'Sullivan	3
(Scotland) Stephen Hendry	6
(England) John Parrott	3

Final; Best of 17 frames
(Scotland) John Higgins	9
(Scotland) Stephen Hendry	4
