= 1982 Masters (snooker) =

Professional non-ranking snooker tournament, Jan 1982

1982 Benson & Hedges Masters
Tournament information
- Dates: 26–31 January 1982
- Venue: Wembley Conference Centre
- City: London
- Country: England
- Format: Non-ranking event
- Total prize fund: £27,000
- Winner's share: £8,000
- Highest break: Tony Meo (ENG) (136)

Final
- Champion: Steve Davis (ENG)
- Runner-up: Terry Griffiths (WAL)
- Score: 9–5

The 1982 Masters (officially the 1982 Benson & Hedges Masters) was a professional non-ranking snooker tournament that took place from 26 to 31 January 1982 at the Wembley Conference Centre in London, England. It was organised by representatives of the sponsors, cigarette brand Benson & Hedges, and sanctioned by the World Professional Billiards and Snooker Association. Twelve players were invited to participate, including debutants Jimmy White and Tony Meo.

Alex Higgins was the defending champion, having defeated Terry Griffiths 9–6 in the 1981 final. They met in the semi-finals in 1982, with Griffiths winning 6–4. The tournament was won by Steve Davis, who led Griffiths 5–3 after the first session of the final and won 9–5.

Meo made the highest break of the tournament, 136, in the third frame of his quarter-final match against Cliff Thorburn, equalling the tournament record set by Griffiths in 1981.

The tournament carried a total prize fund of £27,000, with £8,000 going to the winner. There was coverage of the event on BBC Television from 27 January.

== Overview ==
The 1982 Masters was staged at the Wembley Conference Centre in London and was the eighth edition of the Masters after its establishment in 1975. It was organised by representatives of the sponsors, cigarette brand Benson & Hedges, and sanctioned by the World Professional Billiards and Snooker Association. Alex Higgins was the defending champion, having beaten Terry Griffiths 9–6 in the 1981 final; Higgins had featured in the four most recent finals before 1982.

As was customary for them, Benson & Hedges invited the top eight players in the 1981–82 snooker world rankings to participate; these were Cliff Thorburn, Steve Davis, Griffiths, Ray Reardon, Dennis Taylor, Doug Mountjoy, David Taylor and Eddie Charlton. Higgins was also invited, as was John Spencer who had won the inaugural Masters in 1975. Jimmy White and Meo, who had both reached the semi-finals of the 1981 UK Championship, were the recipients of the last two invitations to the tournament. White, aged 19, had won the Langs Scottish Masters and the Northern Ireland Classic earlier in the season. It was the first Masters for both White and Meo.

Jean Rafferty, whose book The Cruel Game: The Inside Story of Snooker (1983) mainly focuses on the 1981–82 snooker season, felt that Wembley was a "perfect setting" for sport, and commented that the field included six professional world champions, plus three world amateur champions (White, Mountjoy and David Taylor) and three "great fighters" (Meo, Charlton and Dennis Taylor).

Davis was the reigning world, United Kingdom and English professional champion, and was the favourite with the bookmaker Mecca to win the event. The Masters was the only major title that he had not won. Griffiths had beaten Davis 9–8 in the final of the 1982 Lada Classic earlier in January, having led 8–3 before eventually winning on the final black. Writing in The Guardian, Clive Everton said that the Masters offered the prospect of a repeat of that final.

Davis reduced his public appearances and travelling so that he could practise for a week before the tournament, in contrast to his preparation for the Lada Classic, when he had spent the previous nine days flying around the world. Reardon had also given up exhibition work to prepare, playing none since Christmas, and had been practising daily with a new cue. Higgins, who did not play until the quarter-finals, missed exhibition engagements during the week, including a match against Davis at Gillingham on 27 January, from which about 900 spectators walked out when he failed to appear. He offered to play two free exhibitions to make up for his non-appearances.

Sportsnight on BBC1 on 27 January included coverage of Charlton playing White. The remaining days of the tournament received broadcast coverage on BBC2. The final was broadcast on 31 January, with live coverage followed by highlights of the concluding session. Desmond Lynam presented the coverage of the final, with commentary provided by Ted Lowe, Jack Karnehm and Everton, and with Rex Williams as the summariser.

=== Format ===
Eight players contested the first round, with the winners joining Davis, Griffiths, Higgins and Thorburn in the quarter-finals. Matches in the first round and quarter-finals were played over nine frames, while the semi-finals were decided by the first player to win six frames. The final was the best of 17 frames, played over afternoon and evening sessions.

=== Prize fund ===
The breakdown of prize money is shown below. £10,000 would have been awarded to the first player making a maximum break.

- Winner: £8,000
- Runner-up: £4,000
- Semi-finals: £2,500
- Quarter-finals: £1,500
- First round: £1,000
- Highest break: £250

Total: £27,000

== Summary ==
=== First round ===
First round matches were played on 26 and 27 January as the best-of-nine frames. Reardon led Dennis Taylor 3–1, but Taylor won the fifth frame on the colours and made a 72, the highest break of the match, to level at 3–3. Reardon won the match 5–3. The author Hunter Davies, who attended the match, remarked that "Reardon looked the classier player to even an untrained eye", and praised Reardon's "smooth and elegant" cue action.

Mountjoy won the first frame against Spencer with a break of 67. Spencer levelled the match with a 76 break in frame two. The Snooker Scene match report said that "the general standard fell away" after this. Spencer was ahead at 3–2 but lost the match 5–4. The match was decided when Mountjoy flukedthe green ball escaping from a snooker.

Meo lost the first frame to David Taylor but won the next four and eventually took the match 5–2. White led Charlton 3–1 after breaks of 78 and 50. Charlton obtained the two snookers that he needed in the fifth frame after White had made a 63 break, and went on to win it. White made an 82 in the sixth frame to lead 4–2, but Charlton levelled at 4–4 with the help of a 61 break in the eighth. Trailing 0–37 in the deciding frame, Charlton made contributions of 51 and 32 to win the match 5–4.

=== Quarter-finals ===
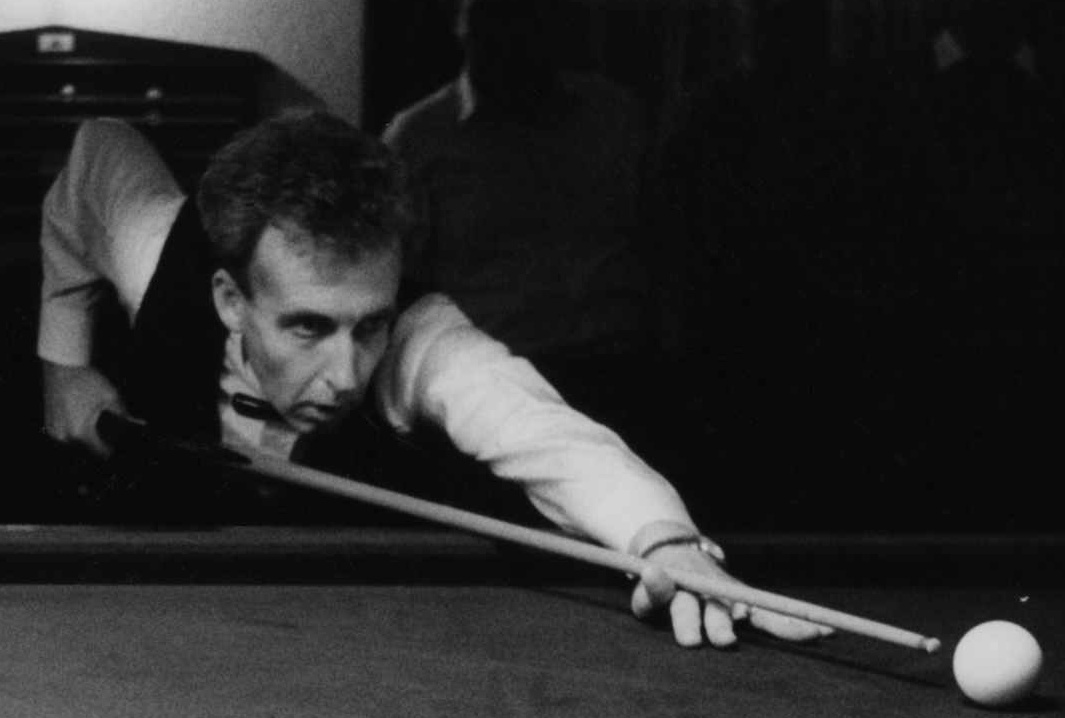
Terry Griffiths (pictured in 1991) reached the final for the third successive year.

The quarter-finals were played from 28 to 29 January as the best-of-nine frames. Meo whitewashed Thorburn 5–0 in 80 minutes, making seven breaks of 45 or more. Meo's 136 clearance in the third frame equalled the tournament record set by Griffiths, and Thorburn scored only 62 points across the five frames. The Daily Telegraph reporter Janice Hale called it Meo's best performance in a major professional event. In the evening match, Davis made a break of 102 in beating Mountjoy 5–2, the first time in five years that a reigning UK champion had won a match at the Masters. Davis had a chance of equalling the tournament record with his century, but he failed to pot the black after taking the last red with all the colours well placed. Mountjoy won the fifth frame to reduce Davis's lead to 3–2, but Davis took the next two frames.

Higgins began his defence by beating Charlton 5–1 in front of 2,562 spectators, a tournament record for an afternoon session. Higgins made a 57 clearance to the pink in the fourth frame, which he had been losing, to lead 3–1 at the mid-session interval, during which he mingled with the crowd and sold signed photographs for £1 each. He took the last two frames 128–0 and 83–31 with breaks of 54, 74 and 67. Griffiths took a 2–0 lead against Reardon, but Reardon levelled at 2–2. Griffiths later led 4–2 and, after losing frame seven, secured victory at 5–3; the match had taken three and a half hours.

=== Semi-finals ===
The semi-finals were held on 30 January as the best-of-eleven frames. The first semi-final was between Davis and Meo, whom Davis had beaten 9–3 the last time they had met in competition, which was in the final of the English Professional Championship the previous March. Davis took a 5–0 lead with breaks of 38, 113, 38, 56 and 73. Meo later said that his only chance in those frames had come in the fourth, and that he had felt unable to join in the audience's laughter when a child began shouting about being tired. A fluked red helped Meo to win the sixth frame, and he then made a 66 in the seventh, breaks of 68 and 40 in the eighth from 0–26 behind, and a 37 in the ninth to close to 4–5. Davis compiled a 40 on his first visit to the table in the tenth frame and completed a 6–4 win with a clearance of 75.

In the second semi-final, Griffiths led Higgins 2–0 and 3–1. At the mid-session interval after the fourth frame, Rafferty saw Higgins and described him as "a frail, pale figure, beleaguered". After the interval, Griffiths extended his lead to 4–1 with a break of 81. Higgins won three of the next four frames. Rafferty wrote that this was achieved through "hard graft, by sheer dogged persistence", with inspired shots and consistent small breaks. In frame ten, Higgins needed the final pink and black to win. He failed in his attempt to pot the pink, leaving it in the jaws of a pocket with Griffiths snookered by the black. Griffiths missed and Higgins took the pink, but did not pot the black. After each player had a further shot on the black, Griffiths potted it to complete a 6–4 victory.

=== Final ===
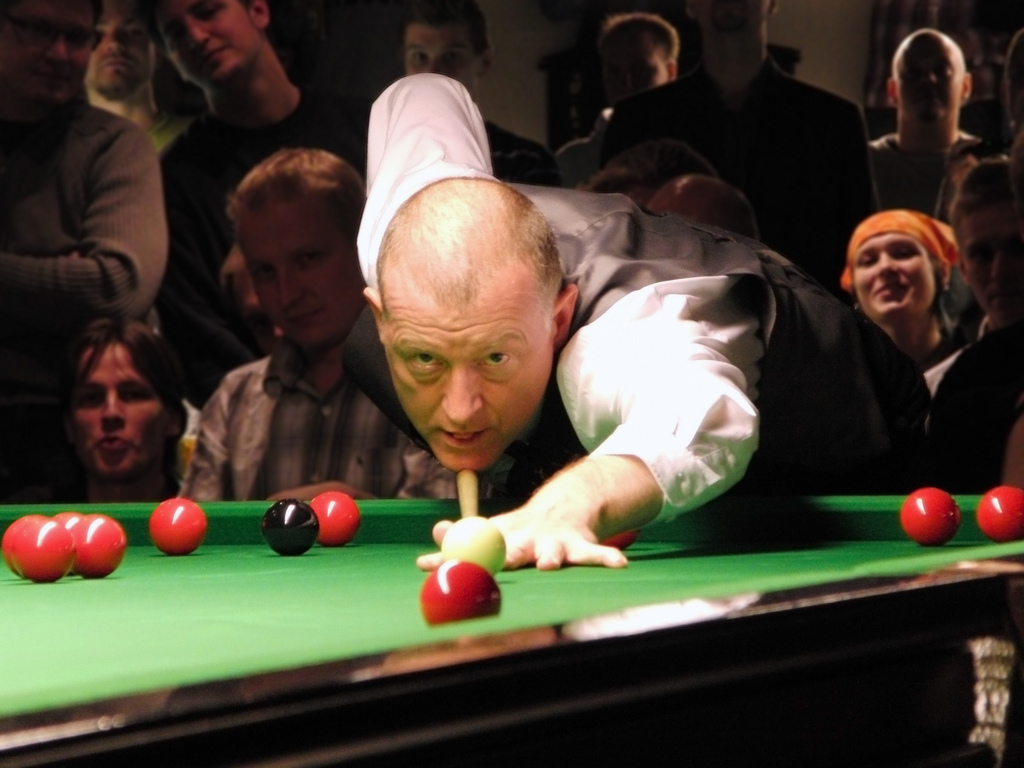
Steve Davis (pictured in 2008) won the Masters for the first time.

The final was played on 31 January between Davis and Griffiths, who was appearing in his third consecutive Masters final. Griffiths led 1–0 and 2–1, before Davis levelled at 2–2 with an 82 break and took the lead for the first time at 3–2. Griffiths made a 64 in the sixth frame to square the match at 3–3. Davis led 4–3 and won the last frame of the afternoon with a 55 clearance to end the session 5–3 ahead.

Davis made a 69 break in the first frame of the evening session to lead 6–3. Griffiths replied with a 72 to reach 4–6, and took the next frame after Davis misjudged a safety shot. Griffiths led the 12th frame by 30 points, but Davis potted a long red and made a clearance of 49 to the pink to lead 7–5. The 13th frame was level at 42–42 before a Griffiths break of 34 ended on the penultimate red, after which Davis made 27 to lead 8–5. Griffiths led in the 14th frame by 53 points, but narrowly failed to pot a black and he later accidentally knocked in the brown ball. Davis then took the last red, the yellow and all the colours to win the frame on the black, taking the match 9–5. Davis said after the match that he liked playing Griffiths, who was a "lovely player and a great sport." He added that he thought the two of them were the best players in the world. The win reversed the result of the Lada Classic final two weeks earlier.

Snooker correspondent Sydney Friskin wrote in The Times that the final was "absorbing but by no means spectacular." Rafferty felt that Davis had won without playing at his best, writing that even below his peak, his play was "still awesome in its intelligence and control." Everton also felt that Davis did not produce his best form, although he was still able to "complete his uniquely comprehensive collection of snooker's major titles."

== Main draw ==
The draw for the tournament is shown below. Match winners are shown in bold.

**First round** Best of 9 frames
**Eddie Charlton (AUS)**	**5**
Jimmy White (ENG)	4
Dennis Taylor (NIR)	3
**Ray Reardon (WAL)**	**5**
David Taylor (ENG)	2
**Tony Meo (ENG)**	**5**
**Doug Mountjoy (WAL)**	**5**
John Spencer (ENG)	4

**Quarter-finals**; Best of 9 frames
**Alex Higgins (NIR)**	**5**
Eddie Charlton (AUS)	1
**Terry Griffiths (WAL)**	**5**
Ray Reardon (WAL)	3
Cliff Thorburn (CAN)	0
**Tony Meo (ENG)**	**5**
**Steve Davis (ENG)**	**5**
Doug Mountjoy (WAL)	2

**Semi-finals**; Best of 11 frames
Alex Higgins (NIR)	4
**Terry Griffiths (WAL)**	**6**
Tony Meo (ENG)	4
**Steve Davis (ENG)**	**6**

**Final**; Best of 17 frames
Terry Griffiths (WAL)	5
**Steve Davis (ENG)**	**9**

== Final: details and frame scores ==
Final
Best of 17 frames. Referee: John Street; Wembley Conference Centre, London, England, 31 January 1982. Numbers in parentheses are breaks of 50 or more.
**Steve Davis (ENG)**	**9**–5	Terry Griffiths (WAL)
First session: 46–**65**, **96**–17, 34–**77**, **102**–29 (82), **90**–19 (71), 4–**84** (64), **93**–17, **112**–14 (55); Second session: **93**–26 (69), 18–**72** (72), 51–**78**, **70**–51, **69**–42, **65**–57
82	Highest break	72
4	50+ breaks	2

== Century breaks ==
The following century breaks were made during the tournament:

- 136 – Tony Meo
- 113, 102 – Steve Davis
