= 1988 World Cup =

1988 World Cup may refer to:

- 1985–1988 Rugby League World Cup
- 1988 World Cup (men's golf)
- 1988 World Cup (snooker)
- Chess World Cup 1988–1989
