= 1992 World Matchplay (snooker) =

World Matchplay
Tournament information
- Dates: 4–12 December 1992
- Venue: The Dome Leisure Centre
- City: Doncaster
- Country: England
- Format: Non-ranking event
- Total prize fund: £160,000
- Winner's share: £70,000
- Highest break: Steve Davis (ENG) (141)

Final
- Champion: (Thailand) James Wattana
- Runner-up: (England) Steve Davis
- Score: 9–4

The 1992 Coalite World Matchplay was a professional non-ranking snooker tournament that took place between 4 and 12 December 1992 at The Dome Leisure Centre in Doncaster, England. This was the final year the tournament was held as ITV which televised this event from 5 December were soon to be ending their snooker coverage on the channel.

James Wattana won the event, defeating Steve Davis 9–4 in the final which was reduced to a two session best of 17 frames final as it was for the first final 4 years earlier.

== Main draw ==
Round 1 Best of 17 frames
(England) Martin Clark	9
(England) Nigel Bond	6
(England) Steve Davis	9
(Canada) Alain Robidoux	3
(Scotland) Alan McManus	9
(Wales) Terry Griffiths	7
(Thailand) James Wattana	9
(Wales) Darren Morgan	7

Quarter-finals; Best of 17 frames
(England) Gary Wilkinson	7
(England) Martin Clark	9
(England) Jimmy White	6
(England) Steve Davis	9
(Scotland) Stephen Hendry	6
(Scotland) Alan McManus	9
(England) John Parrott	3
(Thailand) James Wattana	9

Semi-finals; Best of 17 frames
(England) Steve Davis	9
(England) Martin Clark	4
(Scotland) Alan McManus	2
(Thailand) James Wattana	9

Final; Best of 17 frames
(England) Steve Davis	4
(Thailand) James Wattana	9
