= 1991 Classic (snooker) =

Mercantile Credit Classic
Tournament information
- Dates: 1–12 January 1991
- Venue: Bournemouth International Centre
- City: Bournemouth
- Country: England
- Organisation: WPBSA
- Format: Ranking event
- Total prize fund: £300,000
- Winner's share: £60,000
- Highest break: Ken Doherty (IRL) (126)

Final
- Champion: Jimmy White (ENG)
- Runner-up: Stephen Hendry (SCO)
- Score: 10–4

The 1991 Mercantile Credit Classic was the twelfth edition of the professional snooker tournament which took place from 1–12 January 1991 with ITV coverage beginning on the 5th. The tournament has now been moved to the Bournemouth International Centre in Dorset after 4 years in Blackpool which had now hosted qualifying rounds taking place on 2nd and 3rd September 1990.

Jimmy White won his second Classic title beating Stephen Hendry 10–4 in the final. This was the second time in a month White beat Hendry in a major final after the World Matchplay. He led 9–0, one frame from a rare "whitewash" final win. Hendry avoided this by winning 4 in a row. White closed the match out 10–4.

== Main draw ==
First Round; Best of 9 frames
(England) Steve James	2
(Australia) John Campbell	5
(England) Joe Johnson	5
(Republic of Ireland) Paddy Browne	3
(Wales) Steve Newbury	5
(England) Andrew Cairns	4
(England) John Virgo	3
(England) Rod Lawler	5
(England) Mike Hallett	5
(Northern Ireland) Jack McLaughlin	3
(England) Barry West	5
(England) Pat Houlihan	0
(Wales) Wayne Jones	w/o
(Northern Ireland) Joe O'Boye	w/d
(Wales) Tony Chappel	5
(England) Willie Thorne	4
(England) Jimmy White	5
(England) Ian Williamson	2
(England) Jonathan Birch	5
(South Africa) Silvino Francisco	4
(Canada) Alain Robidoux	5
(England) Bill Oliver	0
(Scotland) Alan McManus	5
(England) Tony Knowles	3
(England) John Parrott	5
(Canada) Mario Morra	2
(Australia) Eddie Charlton	5
(England) Nigel Gilbert	3
(Northern Ireland) Jason Prince	5
(South Africa) Peter Francisco	1
(Republic of Ireland) Ken Doherty	5
(England) Dean Reynolds	1
(England) Steve Davis	5
(England) Ken Owers	1
(Wales) Cliff Wilson	5
(Scotland) John Rea	3
(England) Neal Foulds	5
(England) Nick Dyson	3
(England) Ian Graham	5
(Canada) Cliff Thorburn	3
(Northern Ireland) Dennis Taylor	5
(England) Les Dodd	4
(England) Gary Wilkinson	5
(Scotland) Matt Smith	2
(Wales) Doug Mountjoy	5
(England) Rex Williams	3
(Thailand) James Wattana	5
(Australia) Warren King	0
(Canada) Bob Chaperon	5
(England) Jason Smith	1
(Wales) Mark Bennett	5
(Wales) Terry Griffiths	2
(Malta) Tony Drago	5
(Malta) Joe Grech	1
(England) Martin Clark	5
(Canada) Jim Wych	2
(New Zealand) Dene O'Kane	5
(England) Steve Longworth	3
(England) David Roe	5
(England) Tony Meo	4
(Scotland) Stephen Hendry	5
(England) Tony Jones	3
(England) Danny Fowler	5
(England) Mick Price	2

Second Round; Best of 9 frames
(Australia) John Campbell	0
(England) Joe Johnson	5
(Wales) Steve Newbury	2
(England) Rod Lawler	5
(England) Mike Hallett	5
(England) Barry West	0
(Wales) Wayne Jones	5
(Wales) Tony Chappel	3
(England) Jimmy White	5
(England) Jonathan Birch	2
(Canada) Alain Robidoux	3
(Scotland) Alan McManus	5
(England) John Parrott	1
(Australia) Eddie Charlton	5
(Northern Ireland) Jason Prince	3
(Republic of Ireland) Ken Doherty	5
(England) Steve Davis	5
(Wales) Cliff Wilson	0
(England) Neal Foulds	5
(England) Ian Graham	0
(Northern Ireland) Dennis Taylor	4
(England) Gary Wilkinson	5
(Wales) Doug Mountjoy	3
(Thailand) James Wattana	5
(Canada) Bob Chaperon	5
(Wales) Mark Bennett	3
(Malta) Tony Drago	5
(England) Martin Clark	2
(New Zealand) Dene O'Kane	5
(England) David Roe	4
(Scotland) Stephen Hendry	5
(England) Danny Fowler	0

Third Round; Best of 9 frames
(England) Joe Johnson	3
(England) Rod Lawler	5
(England) Mike Hallett	5
(Wales) Wayne Jones	2
(England) Jimmy White	5
(Scotland) Alan McManus	1
(Australia) Eddie Charlton	2
(Republic of Ireland) Ken Doherty	5
(England) Steve Davis	1
(England) Neal Foulds	5
(England) Gary Wilkinson	5
(Thailand) James Wattana	2
(Canada) Bob Chaperon	3
(Malta) Tony Drago	5
(New Zealand) Dene O'Kane	2
(Scotland) Stephen Hendry	5

Quarter-finals; Best of 9 frames
(England) Rod Lawler	2
(England) Mike Hallett	5
(England) Jimmy White	5
(Republic of Ireland) Ken Doherty	3
(England) Neal Foulds	5
(England) Gary Wilkinson	3
(Malta) Tony Drago	4
(Scotland) Stephen Hendry	5

Semi-finals; Best of 11 frames
(England) Mike Hallett	4
(England) Jimmy White	6
(England) Neal Foulds	4
(Scotland) Stephen Hendry	6

Final; Best of 19 frames
(England) Jimmy White	10
(Scotland) Stephen Hendry	4

== Final ==
Final: Best of 19 frames. Referee: John Street; Bournemouth International Centre, Bournemouth, England, 12 January 1991.
Jimmy White; England	10–4	Stephen Hendry; Scotland
First session: 66–55, 62–53 (White 62, Hendry 53), 95–13, 70–24 (60), 83–24 (51), 85–20 (50), 72–9, 75–20; Second session: 59–55, 16–81 (70), 33–62, 38–79, 24–61 (54), 70–13
62	Highest break	70
0	Century breaks	0
4	50+ breaks	3

== Century breaks ==
(Including qualifying rounds)

- 135 – Tony Chappel
- 131, 126 – Ken Doherty
- 124 – Brian Morgan
- 112 – Tony Jones
- 112 – Kirk Stevens
- 110 – Stephen Hendry
- 108, 104 – Neal Foulds
- 108 – James Wattana
- 108 – Terry Whitthread
- 106, 101 – Tony Drago
- 106 – Mark Bennett
- 102 – Alan McManus
