= 1985 Carlsberg Challenge =

Carlsberg Challenge
Tournament information
- Dates: 6–8 September 1985
- Venue: RTÉ Studios
- City: Dublin
- Country: Ireland
- Organisation: WPBSA
- Format: Non-ranking event
- Total prize fund: £40,000
- Winner's share: £11,000
- Highest break: Jimmy White (ENG) (122)

Final
- Champion: Jimmy White (ENG)
- Runner-up: Alex Higgins (NIR)
- Score: 8–3

The 1985 Carlsberg Challenge was a non-ranking snooker tournament, which took place between 6 and 8 September 1985. The tournament featured four professional players and was filmed in RTÉ Studios, Dublin, for broadcast on RTÉ.

Jimmy White won the tournament for the second year in a row defeating Alex Higgins 8–3.

== Main draw ==
Results for the tournament are shown below.

Semi-finals; Best of 9 frames
Jimmy White (ENG)	5
John Parrott (ENG)	3
Alex Higgins (NIR)	5
Cliff Thorburn (CAN)	4

Final; Best of 15 frames
Jimmy White (ENG)	8
Alex Higgins (NIR)	3
