= 1980 World Amateur Snooker Championship =

Tournament information
- Dates: 26 October – 9 November 1980
- Venue: Albert Hall
- City: Launceston, Tasmania
- Country: Australia
- Organisation: Billiards and Snooker Control Council, International Billiards and Snooker Federation
- Format: Round-robin and knockout
- Highest break: Eugene Hughes (IRE), 127

Final
- Champion: Jimmy White (ENG)
- Runner-up: Ron Atkins (AUS)
- Score: 11–2

The 1980 World Amateur Snooker Championship was the ninth edition of the tournament also known as the IBSF World Snooker Championship. The 1980 tournament was played in Launceston, Tasmania from 26 October to 9 November 1980. Jimmy White defeated Ron Atkins 11–2 in the final to win the title.

== Tournament summary ==
The first World Amateur Snooker Championship was held in 1963, and, after the second event in 1966, had been played every two years since. The 1980 tournament was held at the Albert Hall in Launceston, Tasmania from 26 October to 9 November 1980, with 28 participants playing in four seven-player round-robin groups followed by a knockout to determine the champion. Cliff Wilson, the 1978 champion, had turned professional in 1979.

Jimmy White, aged 17, was the top seed in the event, and reached the final where he played Ron Atkins. Atkins, president of the Tasmanian snooker association, and a resident of Launceston, had entered the competition as late replacement, filling a place vacated by Chris Cooper from the Isle of Man. White led 9–1 after the first session and won the match 11–2, becoming the youngest player to win the World Amateur Championship. His application to turn professional after the tournament had previously been accepted by the World Professional Billiards and Snooker Association.

Eugene Hughes compiled a record World Amateur championship break of 127 against Arvind Savur in the group stage, which remained the highest break of the 1980 tournament.

== Qualifying groups ==
The final tables are shown below. Players in bold qualified for the next round. The top eight seedings are shown in parentheses.

Group A

Player	MW	FW	FL	Break
**Jimmy White (ENG)** (1)	6	24	9	99
**Arvind Savur (IND)** (8)	4	20	11	67
Eugene Hughes (IRE)	4	21	13	127
Joe Grech (MLT)	3	19	18	80
Len Adams (NZL)	3	15	18	54
Loo Yap Long (SIN)	1	6	23	57
Raymond Burke (NIR)	0	11	24	50

Group B

Player	MW	FW	FL	Break
**James Giannaros (AUS)**	6	24	11	54
**Steve Newbury (WAL)** (2)	4	20	14	100
Robert Paquette (CAN) (7)	4	20	15	90
Dale Meredith (NZL)	4	20	16	67
Girish Parikh (IND)	2	17	18	46
Sam Clarke (NIR)	1	10	22	44
Lau Weng Yew (SIN)	0	8	24	36

Group C

Player	MW	FW	FL	Break
**Paul Mifsud (MLT)** (5)	6	24	3	77
**Ron Atkins (AUS)** (Note: Replaced Chris Cooper (Isle of Man), who did not arrive for the tournament)	4	19	15	67
Jim Bonner (AUS) (Note: Replaced Tom Lee (Canada), who did not arrive for the tournament)	4	17	17	53
Warren King (AUS)	3	19	15	57
Eddie McLaughlin (SCO)	3	16	16	67
Joe O'Boye (ENG) (4)	1	14	21	98
Som Padayachi (FIJ)	0	2	24	40

Group D

Player	MW	FW	FL	Break
**Alwyn Lloyd (WAL)** (6)	6	24	4	47
**John Campbell (AUS)** (3)	5	22	8	84
Dessie Sheehan (IRE)	4	17	14	69
Matt Gibson (SCO)	3	16	20	80
Henry Boteju (LKA)	2	16	20	45
Peter Reynolds (IOM)	1	11	23	35
Bill Barrie (AUS) (Note: Replaced John Sue Lum (Fiji), who withdrew)	0	7	24	39

== Knockout ==
Players in bold denote match winners.

**Quarter-finals**; Best of 9 frames
**Jimmy White (ENG)**	**5**
Steve Newbury (WAL)	4
**Paul Mifsud (MLT)**	**5**
John Campbell (AUS)	3
James Giannaros (AUS)	3
**Ron Atkins (AUS)**	**5**
Alwyn Lloyd (WAL)	3
**Arvind Savur (IND)**	**5**

**Semi-finals**; Best of 15 frames
**Jimmy White (ENG)**	**8**
Paul Mifsud (MLT)	6
**Ron Atkins (AUS)**	**8**
Arvind Savur (IND)	6

**Final**; Best of 21 frames
**Jimmy White (ENG)**	**11**
Ron Atkins (AUS)	2

== Final ==
Scores in bold indicate winning frame scores.

Final: Best of 21 frames.
**Jimmy White** (England)	**11**–2	Ron Atkins (Australia)
**59**–51; **86**–47; **56**–42; **103**–13; 63–**67**; **118**–13; **72**–64; **107**–7; **86**–38; **70**–30; **76**–13; 29–**47**; **70**–50
