= 1983 International Masters =

1983 Yamaha International Masters
Tournament information
- Dates: 28 February – 6 March 1983
- Venue: Assembly Rooms
- City: Derby
- Country: England
- Organisation: WPBSA
- Format: Non-ranking event
- Total prize fund: £54,000
- Winner's share: £12,000?
- Highest break: (England) Willie Thorne (133)

Final
- Champion: (Wales) Ray Reardon
- Runner-up: (England) Jimmy White
- Score: 9–6

The 1983 International Masters (officially the 1983 Yamaha International Masters) was a non-ranking snooker tournament, that was held between 28 February to 6 March 1983 at the Assembly Rooms in Derby, England. Ray Reardon won the final title of his career at the age of 50 years and 149 days old.

== Main draw ==
=== Group 1 ===
Player 1	Score	Player 2	Date
(England) Jimmy White	2–0	(Canada) Bill Werbeniuk	
(England) Jimmy White	2–0	(England) Tony Knowles	
(England) Steve Davis	0–2	(England) Jimmy White	
(England) Tony Knowles	0–2	(Canada) Bill Werbeniuk	
(England) Steve Davis	1–2	(England) Tony Knowles	
(England) Steve Davis	2–0	(Canada) Bill Werbeniuk	

=== Group 2 ===
Player 1	Score	Player 2	Date
(England) David Taylor	2–1	(Wales) Cliff Wilson	
(England) Tony Meo	0–2	(England) David Taylor	
(Wales) Ray Reardon	2–0	(Wales) Cliff Wilson	
(Wales) Ray Reardon	2–0	(England) David Taylor	
(England) Tony Meo	2–1	(Wales) Cliff Wilson	
(Wales) Ray Reardon	0–2	(England) Tony Meo	

=== Group 3 ===
Player 1	Score	Player 2	Date
(Wales) Terry Griffiths	2–1	(England) Doug French	
(Wales) Terry Griffiths	2–0	(Canada) Kirk Stevens	
(Wales) Terry Griffiths	2–0	(Australia) Eddie Charlton	
(Canada) Kirk Stevens	0–2	(England) Doug French	
(Australia) Eddie Charlton	2–1	(Canada) Kirk Stevens	
(Australia) Eddie Charlton	2–0	(England) Doug French	

=== Group 4 ===
Player 1	Score	Player 2	Date
(England) Willie Thorne	2–0	(England) John Spencer	
(Wales) Doug Mountjoy	0–2	(England) Willie Thorne	
(Northern Ireland) Alex Higgins	0–2	(England) John Spencer	
(Northern Ireland) Alex Higgins	1–2	(Wales) Doug Mountjoy	
(Wales) Doug Mountjoy	2–0	(England) John Spencer	
(Northern Ireland) Alex Higgins	2–1	(England) Willie Thorne	

=== Semi-final group 1 ===
Player 1	Score	Player 2	Date
(Australia) Eddie Charlton	1–2	(England) Willie Thorne	
(Wales) Ray Reardon	1–2	(England) Willie Thorne	
(Wales) Ray Reardon	2–0	(Australia) Eddie Charlton	
(England) Steve Davis	1–2	(Wales) Ray Reardon	
(England) Steve Davis	2–1	(Australia) Eddie Charlton	
(England) Steve Davis	2–0	(England) Willie Thorne	

=== Semi-final group 2 ===
Player 1	Score	Player 2	Date
(England) Jimmy White	2–0	(Wales) Doug Mountjoy	
(England) Jimmy White	2–0	(England) David Taylor	
(Wales) Doug Mountjoy	0–2	(England) David Taylor	
(Wales) Terry Griffiths	0–2	(Wales) Doug Mountjoy	
(Wales) Terry Griffiths	2–1	(England) David Taylor	
(Wales) Terry Griffiths	2–0	(England) Jimmy White	

=== Final ===
Final: Best of 17 frames. Referee: Assembly Rooms, Derby, England. 6 March 1983.
Ray Reardon; Wales	9–6	Jimmy White; England
33–90, 39–61 (50), 99–21, 54–68, 79–3 (51), 21–111, 61–36, 45–75 (75), 83–38 (66), 33–75, 74–26 (57), 76–50, 97–16 (76), 73–35, 89–13
76	Highest break	75
0	Century breaks	0
4	50+ breaks	2

== Qualifying ==
=== Group 1 ===
Player 1	Score	Player 2	Date
(England) John Spencer	1–2	(Wales) Cliff Wilson	
(Wales) Cliff Wilson	2–1	(England) Fred Davis	
(England) John Spencer	2–0	(England) Fred Davis	

=== Group 2 ===
Player 1	Score	Player 2	Date
(England) Willie Thorne	2–0	(England) Joe Johnson	
(England) Willie Thorne	2–0	(Northern Ireland) Dennis Taylor	
(England) Willie Thorne	2–0	(England) Tony Meo	
(England) Tony Meo	2–0	(England) Joe Johnson	
(Northern Ireland) Dennis Taylor	0–2	(England) Tony Meo	

=== Group 3 ===
Player 1	Score	Player 2	Date
(England) Jimmy White	2–0	(England) Graham Miles	
(England) Jimmy White	2–0	(England) Doug French	
(England) Jimmy White	1–2	(England) John Virgo	
(England) John Virgo	1–2	(England) Graham Miles	
(England) Graham Miles	1–2	(England) Doug French	
(England) John Virgo	0–2	(England) Doug French	

=== Group 4 ===
Player 1	Score	Player 2	Date
(England) Tony Knowles	2–0	(Republic of Ireland) Patsy Fagan	
(England) Tony Knowles	2–0	(Scotland) Ian Black	
(Wales) Terry Griffiths	2–1	(Scotland) Ian Black	
(Wales) Terry Griffiths	2–1	(Republic of Ireland) Patsy Fagan	
(Wales) Terry Griffiths	2–0	(England) Tony Knowles	
(Republic of Ireland) Patsy Fagan	2–1	(Scotland) Ian Black	
