= Jimmy White =

English professional snooker player

Jimmy White MBE
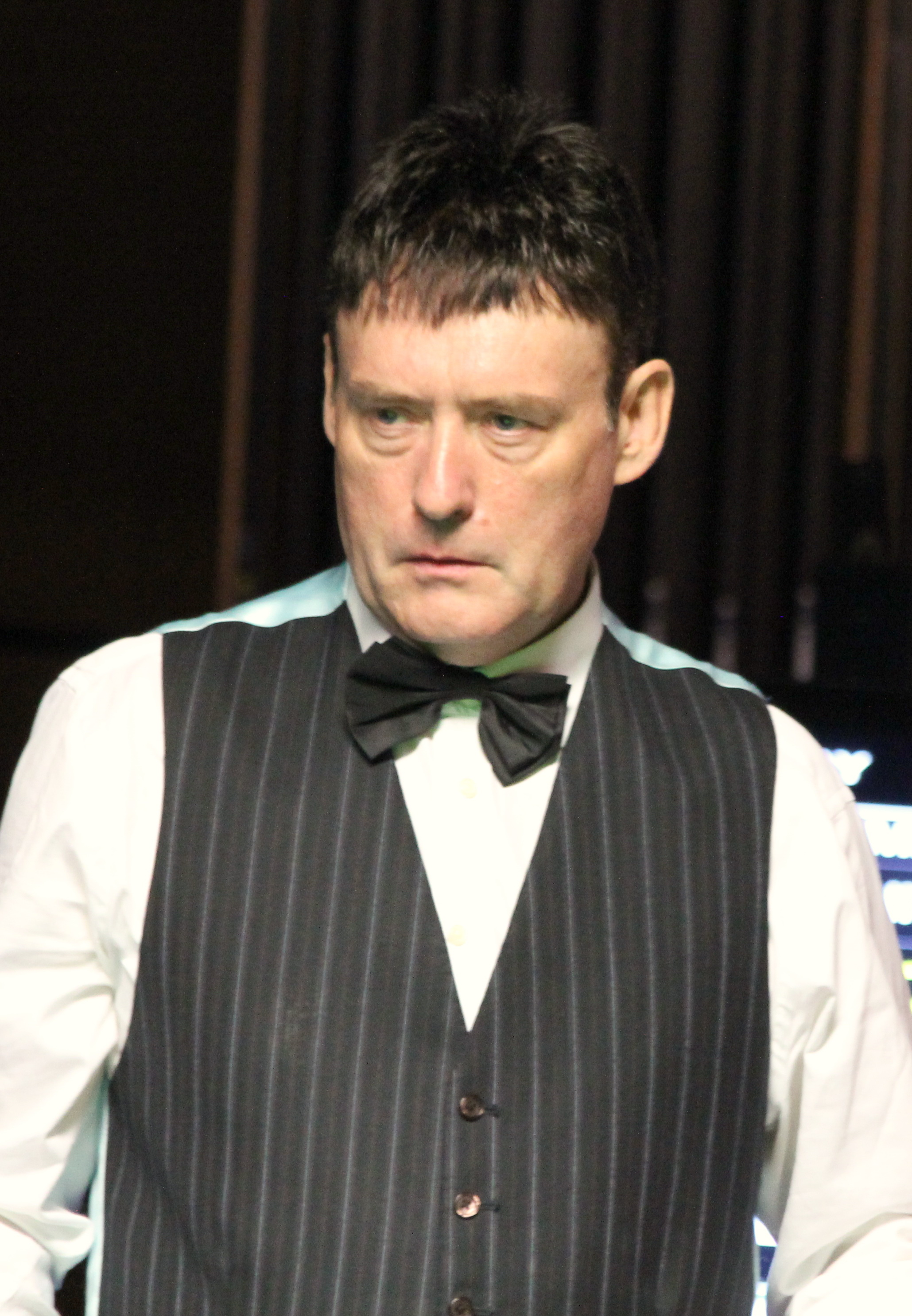
- White at the 2016 Paul Hunter Classic

Personal information
- Nickname: The Whirlwind
- Born: 2 May 1962 (age 64) Tooting, London, England

Sport
- Country: England
- Sport: Snooker
- Professional: 1980–present
- Highest ranking: 2 (1987/88–1988/89)
- Current ranking: 105 (as of 26 October 2026)
- Maximum breaks: 1
- Century breaks: 331 (as of 4 November 2026)

Tournament wins
- Ranking: 10

James Warren White (born 2 May 1962) is an English professional snooker player, commentator and pundit. Nicknamed "The Whirlwind" because of his swift and attacking style of play, he has won ten ranking titles, placing him twelfth on the all-time list of ranking event winners. He has won two of snooker's Triple Crown events, the Masters in 1984 and the UK Championship in 1992, but has lost all six of the World Snooker Championship finals he contested. He finished runner-up to Steve Davis in 1984, to Stephen Hendry in 1990, 1992, 1993, and 1994, and to John Parrott in 1991. He is widely regarded as one of the best players never to have won the World Championship.

White won the 1979 English Amateur Championship and the 1980 World Amateur Snooker Championship, turning professional after the latter event. He made his Crucible debut at the 1981 World Championship, losing 8–10 in the first round to eventual champion Steve Davis. He reached the semi-finals for the first time in 1982, losing 15–16 to that year's winner Alex Higgins. In 1984, he won the Masters, reached his first World Championship final, and won the 1984 World Doubles Championship with Higgins. He claimed his first ranking title at the 1986 Classic, defeating Cliff Thorburn 13–12 in the final, and reached a career-high ranking of second in the 1987–88 and 1988–89 world rankings. He has made over 300 century breaks in professional competition. He compiled the only maximum break of his career at the 1992 World Championship, where he became the first left-handed player, and the second player overall, to record a 147 in a World Championship match.

Since his victory at the 1992 UK Championship, White has won only one further ranking title, at the 2004 Players Championship. His most recent appearance at the main stage of the World Championship came at the 2006 edition; he has lost in the qualifiers each year since. After ending the 2016–17 season outside the top 64 in the world rankings, he remained on the professional tour through invitational tour cards. At the 2023 German Masters, he became the first player over 60 to reach the last 16 of a ranking event since Eddie Charlton in 1992. He earned a two-year tour card on merit for the 2023–24 and 2024–25 seasons and was given another invitational card for the 2025–26 and 2026–27 seasons. At the age of 64, he is currently the oldest player on the professional tour. He also competes on the World Seniors Tour, where he has won the World Seniors Championship a record four times, in 2010, 2019, 2020, and 2023. He received an MBE in the 1999 New Year Honours and was inducted into the World Snooker Tour Hall of Fame in 2017.

== Early life and influences ==
James Warren White was born on 2 May 1962 in Tooting, London, England, and studied at Ernest Bevin School. He never achieved academic success and was often truant from school from the age of eight or nine. He spent increasing amounts of time at Ted Zanincelli's snooker hall, Zan's. It was around this time that White met Tony Meo, with whom he would compete in money matches at different venues, with stakes put up by taxi driver "Dodgy Bob" Davis, who also drove them to the venues. White played his "hero" and future friend Alex Higgins for the first time, aged 13, in an exhibition in Balham. Speaking much later about Higgins' influence on his career, White said that watching him play in the 1970s was "the reason I started to play the game." He has also acknowledged the influence that Higgins had on his playing style saying "I modelled my game on him...I was only the Whirlwind because he was the Hurricane." In 1976, club owner Henry West, who managed leading snooker prospect Patsy Fagan, met White at Zan's and became manager for both White and Meo.

== Career ==
=== 1977–1991 ===
White lost 2–3 to Meo in the final of the 1977 Pontins Junior Championship, and defeated David Bonney 3‍–‍2 in the final of the British Under-16s Championship the same year. He won the 1979 English Amateur Championship a month before his 17th birthday, becoming the youngest champion at the event. He won the London section of the tournament by defeating Danny Adds 4–1 in the final, and then secured victory in the Southern Area section, culminating with an 8–5 win over Cliff Wilson. White then defeated Northern Section winner Dave Martin 13–10 in the grand final. White reached the final of the Pontins Spring Open (out of 1034 entries), beating Doug Mountjoy, Neville Suthers, John Howell and Paul Medati before losing 3–7 to Steve Davis, despite Davis giving White a 30-point start per frame and White having led 3‍–‍1.

The Billiards and Snooker Control Council decided to exclude White from the 1980 World Amateur Snooker Championship as a punishment because he appeared to have been impaired by drinking alcohol during a Home International match against Steve Newbury. The decision was reversed the following week. White was the top seed for the championship, and won all six matches in his qualifying group. In the quarter-finals, from 2–4 against Newbury, he won 5‍–‍4, and then eliminated Paul Mifsud 8–6 in the semi-finals after trailing 0‍–‍3 and 4–6. He won the final 11–2 against Ron Atkins, becoming the youngest winner of the title.

White had already been accepted as a professional by the World Professional Billiards and Snooker Association (WPBSA) before the World Amateur Championship, to take effect after the tournament. In his debut season, he defeated Bernie Mikkelsen and Jim Meadowcroft in the qualifying competition for the 1981 World Championship but then lost 8–10 to Davis in the first round. Around April 1981, White changed his management to Sportsworld, set up by Harvey Lisberg and Geoff Lomas, which paid West £10,000 for the transfer. Lisberg arranged for White's teeth to be straightened, his hair to be permed, and encouraged him to wear good suits. A photoshoot with Patrick Lichfield was arranged to provide press pictures. White's makeover was featured on the BBC TV news and current affairs programme Newsnight.

At the start of the 1981–82 snooker season, White won his first professional title, the non-ranking Scottish Masters, defeating both Ray Reardon and Davis in matches that went to a deciding frame. In the final he beat Cliff Thorburn 9–4. White trailed 0–3 and 1–4 but then won eight frames in a row to win the title and the £8,000 first prize. Later in the year he also won the invitational Northern Ireland Classic, defeating Davis 11‍–‍9, but Davis whitewashed him 0–9 in their semi-final at the 1981 UK Championship. His performances led to him being given an invitation to the 1982 Masters, where he lost 4‍–‍5 to Eddie Charlton in the first round. At the 1982 World Snooker Championship, White eliminated world number one Thorburn, then Perrie Mans and Kirk Stevens, to reach the semi-finals. He led Alex Higgins 15–14 in their semi-final. In the penultimate frame, White was 59 points ahead, but after missing a red with the rest, he could only watch as Higgins compiled a frame-winning 69 break. Higgins won the deciding frame that followed to reach the final. Reflecting on the match many years later, White said: "facing him [Alex Higgins] at the Crucible in Sheffield is what I had dreamt about from when I was 10 years old." When the professional rankings were updated at the end of the season, he moved from 21st place to 10th.

The 1982–83 snooker season was the first in which two tournaments outside the World Snooker Championship counted towards the ranking list. White reached the final of the second of these, the 1982 Professional Players Tournament, where he was defeated 8–10 by Reardon. He also lost to Reardon in the final of the non-ranking 1983 International Masters. At the 1983 World Championship, he suffered a first-round exit to Meo, 8–10.

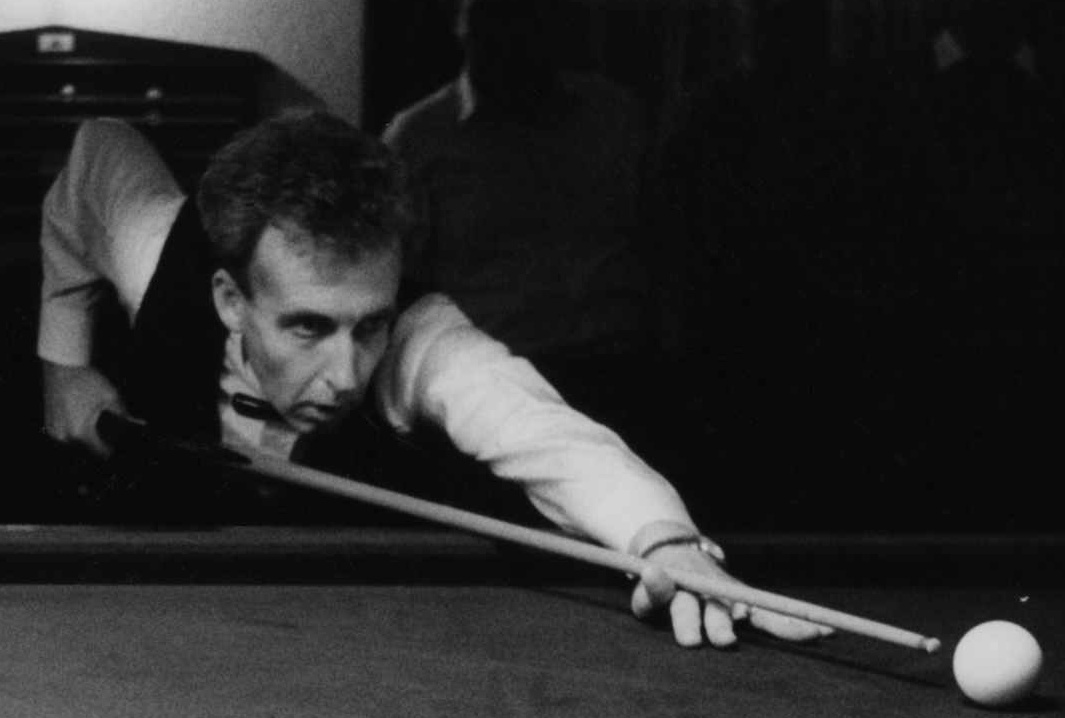
White's first Triple Crown victory was against Terry Griffiths (pictured in 1991) at the 1984 Masters

In 1984, White won his first Triple Crown event at the Masters, although the concept of the triple crown (winning the World Championship, UK Championship and Masters) did not exist in snooker at the time. He beat Charlton, Reardon and Kirk Stevens to reach the final where he triumphed over Terry Griffiths 9–5. He followed this success by reaching his first World Championship final. Trailing Davis 4–12 after the first two sessions, White responded by reducing the deficit to 15–16. He later made a clearance of 65 to take the score to 16–17, but was unable to build upon a 40-point lead in the following frame, and lost 16–18. White did, however, become a World Doubles Champion later that year when he and Alex Higgins defeated Willie Thorne and Thorburn 10–2 in the final of the World Doubles Championship. In February 1985, White successfully won a court case against Lisberg, who had sought to prevent him changing management to Golden Leisure. After winning the 1985 Irish Masters with a 9–5 victory against Alex Higgins, He reached the quarter-finals at the 1985 World Championship in April, but exited the tournament with a 10–13 loss to Tony Knowles.

White took a 7–0 lead against Thorburn in the 1985 Matchroom Trophy final, but was beaten 10–12. White had led by 74 points to nil in the eighth frame, but he conceded three penalties from fouls three times, including two leaving free balls, and Thorburn eventually won that frame on the black ball, the first time that a frame in professional snooker had been won after such a deficit. Writing in Snooker Scene, Clive Everton suggested that White was shaken by this and that the frame "turned the match". In 1986, he reached his second Masters final, but was defeated by Thorburn 5–9. He then defeated Thorburn in a final-frame decider to win his first ranking title, the Classic. Having won the first four frames and leading 4–3 after the first session, White forfeited a frame for arriving late at the second session, and finished that session one frame behind at 7–8. In the deciding frame of the third session, White required one snooker; he snookered Thorburn on the final pink ball and after Thorburn failed to hit the pink, White potted the pink and black for victory. Later that season, he retained the Irish Masters title with a 9–5 victory over Thorne.

White changed his management again in September 1986, joining Barry Hearn's Matchroom stable; the addition of White meant that Matchroom managed seven of the top thirteen players. White reportedly paid £50,000 to Golden Leisure's successor company to buy himself out, while still paying a proportion of his earnings to Sportsworld under the terms of the earlier court ruling. He played future rival Stephen Hendry for the first time professionally at the 1986 Scottish Masters, with White winning their clash 5–1. Later in the year, he overcame veteran Rex Williams 10–6 to win his first Grand Prix title. He lost in the deciding frame to Davis, 12–13, at the 1987 Classic. White's third ranking event win came at the 1987 British Open, where he lifted the trophy after a 13–9 victory over Neal Foulds. This helped him to end the 1986–87 season as world number two, behind Davis who defeated him 11–16 in the semi-finals of the 1987 World Championship.

Later in 1987, White and Davis contested the UK Championship final which Davis won 16–14 after they had been level at 7–7 and 12–12. He was part of the England team that won the 1988 Snooker World Cup. Playing alongside Davis and Foulds, the trio secured a 9–7 victory over Australia in the final. In 1988, he defeated John Campbell, Hendry and Knowles to reach his fourth World Championship semi-final. He played Griffiths and, trailing 11–13, lost a tied frame on a re-spotted black. Griffiths went on win the match 16–11 win and reach the final. White played John Virgo in the second round of the 1989 World Championship and won 13–12. The win was a short-lived consolation as he was beaten 7–13 by eventual finalist John Parrott in the quarter-finals. White avenged this defeat later in the year by beating Parrott 18–9 in the final of the invitational World Matchplay.

In 1990, White recorded a 16–14 victory over Davis in the semi-finals of the 1990 World Championship. It was Davis's first defeat in the event in four years. White subsequently lost his second World Championship final 12–18 to Hendry. White then beat Hendry 18–9 to retain his World Matchplay title later in the year and that win was followed by a 10–4 victory over Hendry (after leading 9–0) in the final of the 1991 Classic. White continued his run of success by beating Tony Drago 10–6 in the final of the 1991 World Masters for his third successive tournament win.

White played Parrott in the final of the 1991 World Championship and was whitewashed in the first session 0–7. White managed to close the gap to 7–11, but Parrott was able to seal an 18–11 victory. White was defeated by Parrott again, 13–16 in the final of the 1991 UK Championship. It was White's fifth defeat in five UK and World Championship finals.

=== 1992–2002 ===
In 1992, White collected his second British Open title, beating Davis in the semi-finals and James Wattana in the final. He won another ranking title, the European Open, shortly after, clinching victory with a 9‍–‍3 win over Mark Johnston-Allen. White was drawn against Drago in the first round of the 1992 World Championship. After opening up an 8–4 lead, White made history in the 13th frame by becoming only the second player to make a maximum break in the World Championship. He won £100,000 in prize money for this feat. Wins over Alain Robidoux, Jim Wych and Alan McManus then followed. He played Hendry in the final and won each of the first two sessions to open up a 10–6 lead, which he extended to 14–8. Hendry fought back and won ten consecutive frames to lift the trophy. Reflecting back on the game in 2025, White said: "I was 14–8 up against Hendry in the World Championship final. It went 14–10. I was completely gone, I was done. Pockets were moving all over the place. Your brain just gets fuzzled."

In the early part of the 1992–93 season, White defeated Ken Doherty 10–9 to claim his second Grand Prix title and followed this with victory in the 1992 UK Championship. He defeated Wattana in the quarter-finals and McManus in the semi-finals to set up a clash with Parrott in the final, whom he overcame to secure a 16–9 win. White has stated that this was among the best matches he has ever played.

At the 1993 World Championship, he overcame Joe Swail, Doug Mountjoy and Dennis Taylor to reach the semi-finals. During his semi-final match against Wattana, White won twelve consecutive frames en route to a 16–9 victory. In the final he lost heavily to Hendry, as White was beaten 5–18 with a session to spare. White then beat McManus 10‍–‍7 to win the European League final.

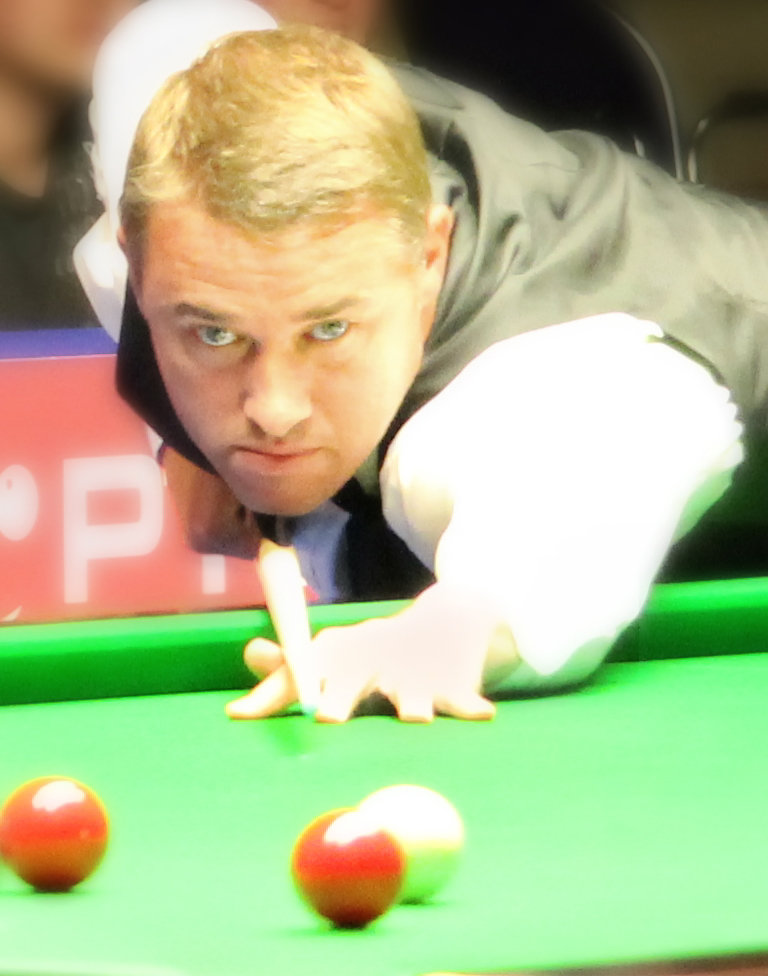
Stephen Hendry (pictured in 2011) defeated White in four World Snooker Championship finals

At the 1994 World Championship, he defeated Darren Morgan in the semi-finals 16‍–‍8 to reach the final for a fifth successive year. For the fourth time in five years, White's opponent in the final was Hendry, and the defending champion opened up a 1–5 lead. White recovered well to lead 13–12 and made a break of 75 to take the match into a decider. In the final frame, White was on a break of 29 and leading by 37 points to 24 when he missed a black off its spot. Hendry made a break of 58 to win the title. After the match, White said of Hendry: "He's beginning to annoy me."

During the 1994–95 season, White was diagnosed with testicular cancer. He recovered after receiving treatment. At the 1995 World Championship, he was involved in a controversial first-round match against Peter Francisco. From 2–2, White was able to pull away and win convincingly by 10 frames to 2. Shortly afterwards, it emerged that large sums of money had been placed on White to win the match by the exact scoreline. The ensuing investigation found Francisco guilty of misconduct and banned him for five years. However no evidence was found against White, and he was cleared of any wrongdoing. He overcame David Roe and Parrott to reach his tenth World Championship semi-final, in which the defending champion Hendry made a 147 break and White lost 12–16.

Along with Davis and Alex Higgins, White was a member of Europe's victorious Mosconi Cup pool team of 1995, and won the deciding match against Lou Butera. He was beaten 12–13 in a second-round encounter with Peter Ebdon in the 1996 World Championship.

White was world ranked 13 in the 1996–97 season. He lost his first eleven matches of the season and a first-round defeat at the 1997 World Championship against Anthony Hamilton (9–10, after leading 8–4) saw him drop out of the top 16 in the world rankings for the first time in 15 years. It also marked just the third time since his debut in 1981 that White had been knocked out of the first round of the competition.

In the 1997–98 season, White advanced to the semi-finals of the 1997 Grand Prix (where he was defeated 2–6 by Dominic Dale) and the quarter-finals at the 1998 World Championship. After qualifying to play Hendry in the first round at the Crucible, White opened with a century break and built up a 7–0 lead. White lost the next three frames, before sealing a 10–4 success. After the match, White said: "I've laid a few ghosts to rest tonight." He followed this with a 13–3 win over Morgan which included a break of 144. In his quarter-final against Ronnie O'Sullivan, however, White lost the first session 1–7, and although he fought back to 6–9, White succumbed to a 7–13 exit. He was knocked out of the first round of the 1999 World Championship by McManus 7–10. White entered the 1999 World Pool Championship. He was knocked out of the tournament by Efren Reyes in a final-frame decider in their last 32 clash.

After regaining his top 16 ranking in the 1999–2000 season, White reached the semi-finals of the Welsh Open, where he lost 5–6 to Stephen Lee. He then defeated Marco Fu and John Higgins to reach the quarter-finals of the Masters, and he followed this up with a run to the quarter-finals of the 2000 World Snooker Championship. On both occasions, however, he was beaten by Matthew Stevens. In the following season, he reached the final of the 2000 British Open (losing 6–9 to Ebdon) and the semi-finals of the 2000 Grand Prix (losing 2–6 to Mark Williams) in the early part of the campaign. White defeated O'Sullivan 6–2 in the 2001 Masters, but he failed to qualify for the 2001 World Championship, after a defeat to Michael Judge in the qualifiers.

In the invitational 2002 Masters, White beat Matthew Stevens 6–1 and came back from 2–5 behind to defeat O'Sullivan 6–5 in the quarter-finals. He then lost his semi-final with Mark Williams 5–6. White lost 3–13 in his second round match with Matthew Stevens at the 2002 World Championship and issued an immediate apology after hitting the cue ball off the table in frustration when trailing 2–5. The result left him provisionally ranked world number ten.

=== 2003–2009 ===
At the invitational 2003 Masters, White secured a first round win against Ebdon, coming back from 1–5 down to win 6–5. He could not progress any further as he exited the tournament at the quarter-final stage with a 4–6 loss to Hendry. In the first round of the 2003 World Championship, White recorded just his second match win in a ranking event of the 2002–03 season with a 10–6 win over Wattana, but was then defeated 11–13 by Lee in his next match. White retained his place in the top 16.

In the 2003–04 season, White showed some return to form. After reaching the semi-finals of the 2003 UK Championship in November (where he lost 7–9 to Matthew Stevens), White defeated Neil Robertson, Hendry and Ebdon to reach the semi-finals of the 2004 Masters – where he lost against O'Sullivan 4–6. White followed this up with further victories over Hendry and Robertson en route to the final of the European Open in Malta, but was beaten 3–9 by Stephen Maguire. His tenth ranking event title came in April 2004, when White defeated Shaun Murphy, Parrott, Ian McCulloch, Ebdon and Paul Hunter to win the Players Championship in Glasgow. This sealed his first ranking title since 1992 and pushed White back into the top 10 of the world rankings. His season concluded in the first round of the 2004 World Championship, where he was knocked out of the tournament by qualifier Barry Pinches 8‍–‍10.

White was eleventh in the world rankings for the 2004–05 season. Before the invitational 2005 Masters, White temporarily changed his name by deed poll to James Brown, due to a sponsorship deal with HP Sauce. He trailed Matthew Stevens 2–5 in their first-round encounter but pulled back to 4–5 after needing two snookers in the ninth frame. He completed the comeback by winning the two remaining frames to clinch a 6–5 victory and then edged past Williams by the same score in the quarter-finals. His run in the tournament ended with a 1–6 loss to O'Sullivan in the semi-finals. White played Matthew Stevens again at the 2005 World Championship but was unable to repeat his comeback at the Masters as he lost heavily in their second-round contest 5–13.

White lost in the first round of the 2006 World Championship to David Gray 5–10. He fell out of the top 32 at the end of the 2005–06 season, having been ranked eighth one year earlier. In the 2006–07 season, he reached the final of the 2006 Premier League with wins against Hendry and Ding Junhui, but he was then whitewashed 0–7 by O'Sullivan. He failed to qualify for the 2007 World Championship after losing 4‍–‍10 to Jamie Burnett, resulting in him missing the main event for just the second time in 27 years. White said he was "devastated" by the defeat.

White was ranked 60th in the 2007–08 season, and he exited in qualifying for the 2008 World Championship with a 3–10 defeat by Mark King. This result contributed to his drop to number 75 in the provisional world rankings. In the 2008–09 season, White suffered several first-round defeats, including at the Northern Ireland Trophy, the Shanghai Masters, and the Welsh Open. He exited qualifying for the 2009 World Championship with an 8–10 loss against Andy Hicks.

=== 2009–2016 ===
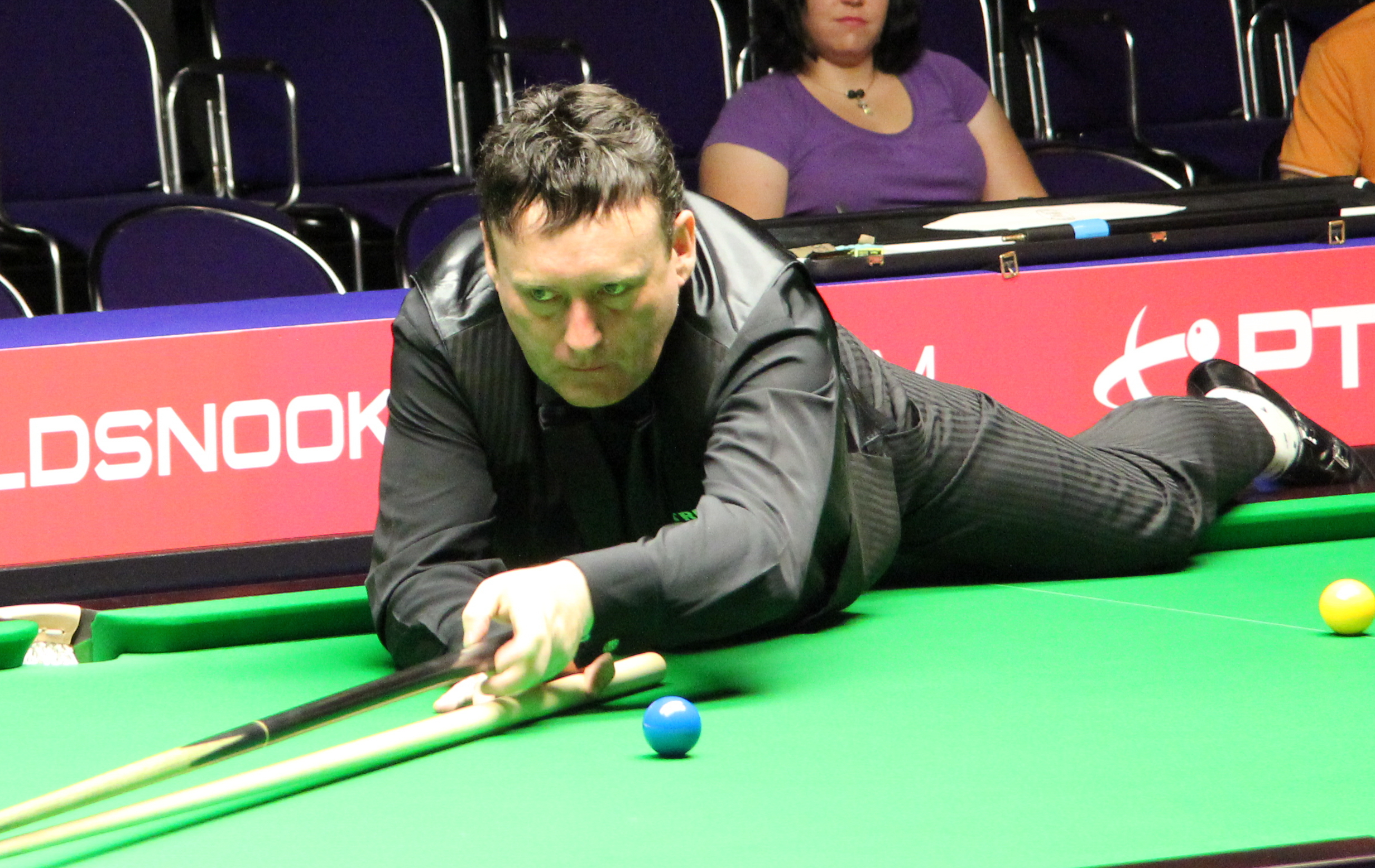
White at the 2011 Paul Hunter Classic

At the start of the 2009–10 season, White reached the final of the Champion of Champions Challenge in Killarney, where he lost 1–5 to Murphy. He then won the Sangsom 6-red World Grand Prix in Bangkok, Thailand, putting an end to his five-year title drought. On his way to the final he defeated Murphy, Ricky Walden, Mark King, and Mark Williams, eventually beating Barry Hawkins in the final 8–6. One month later, in the Paul Hunter Classic, White again reached the final but this time he lost to Murphy 0–4. In October, he reached the final of the invitational World Series of Snooker in Prague, his fourth final of the season. White claimed his second title of the season by defeating Graeme Dott 5–3.

In the 2010 Masters, White played King in the wild card round, but lost the match 2–6. Prior to the 2010 World Championship, White failed to qualify for both the Welsh Open and China Open. Due to this, and skipping the UK Championship for I'm a Celebrity...Get Me Out of Here!, he came close to losing his tour card for the following season, but saved it with a win over Mark Boyle during an ultimately unsuccessful bid to qualify for the World Championship.

White started the 2010–11 season by entering the Players Tour Championship, his best performance coming in the first European event and at the sixth event in Sheffield, where he reached the quarter-finals each time. After twelve out of twelve events, White was ranked 34th in the Order of Merit. He won the 2010 World Seniors Championship, defeating Thorburn and Parrott to reach the final where he triumphed over Steve Davis 4–1 to secure his first world seniors title. At the 2010 UK Championship in December, White lost 8–9 to Hendry in the first round, after he had come through three qualifying rounds. It was only the fifth time in 24 years that White and Hendry had taken each other to the final frame. White lost his first qualifying match for the 2011 World Championship 9–10 against Jimmy Robertson.

White began the 2011–12 season ranked number 55. At a Legends Tour event in June 2011, White compiled a maximum break, unusually potting the first ball off the break, meaning his opponent never played a shot in the frame. White was unable to defend his World Seniors Championship title, as he lost in the semi-finals 0–2 against eventual champion Morgan. White also failed to qualify for the 2011 UK Championship, losing 5–6 against Jamie Jones. After the FFB Snooker Open, he was ranked number 47.

At the 2013 World Seniors Championship, White lost to Hendry in the quarter-final. White finished the 2013–14 season ranked world number 61, almost losing his place on the professional World Snooker circuit. His final game of the season was a 4–10 defeat to Ian Burns in qualifying for the 2014 World Championship. In November 2014, while speaking about the World Championship, White said: "I'm not finished yet [...] I still have very strong belief I can win it." Both the 2014–15 and 2015–16 seasons ended in disappointment when White lost in qualifying for the World Championship, to Matthew Selt and Gerard Greene respectively.

=== 2016–present ===
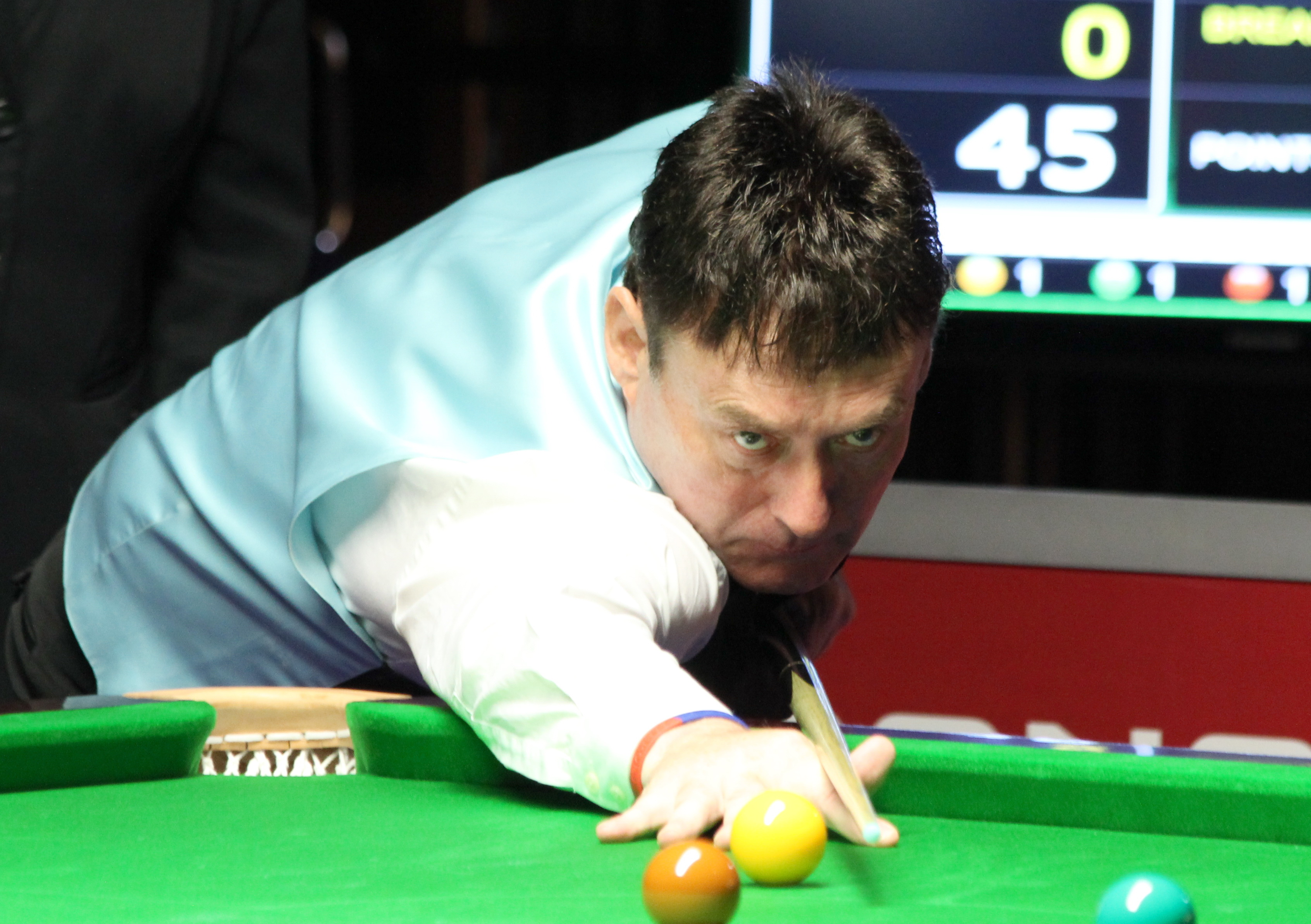
White at the 2016 Paul Hunter Classic

White made it to the quarter-finals of a ranking event for the first time in over a decade at the 2016 Paul Hunter Classic in Germany, but he exited the tournament with a 2–4 defeat against Dale. He finished the 2016–17 season outside the top 64 and lost his tour card after 37 years as a professional, but the World Snooker Tour decided to give White a two-year invitational tour card.

White won his first professional title in seven years after winning the inaugural 2017 UK Seniors Championship, part of the World Seniors Tour. In the competition, he defeated qualifier Jonathan Bagley to set up a final with Doherty which he won 4–2. White later played in the qualifiers for the 2018 World Snooker Championship, losing to Joe Perry 5–10.

White won the World Seniors Championship in August 2019 with a 5–3 victory over Morgan in the final at the Crucible. This meant he qualified for the 2019 Champion of Champions, where despite taking a three frame lead, he narrowly lost 3–4 to O'Sullivan in the first round. In the 2020 World Seniors Championship, White fought back from four frames behind to beat Doherty 5–4 and retain his title.

After a 3–6 defeat to long-time rival Hendry during an attempt to qualify for the 2021 World Championship, White was given a new two-year invitational tour card in recognition of "his outstanding contribution to the sport". He finished runner-up at both the 2021 and 2022 World Seniors Championships, losing to David Lilley 3–5 and Lee Walker 4–5 respectively.

In November 2022, White, aged 60, reached the televised stages of the 2022 UK Championship, becoming the oldest player to reach the last 32 since Eddie Charlton in 1993. He lost his match to Ryan Day 2–6. Afterwards, White said of the occasion: "That's why I still play snooker, for their support on nights like this...It was magical, mind blowing, I will never forget it." At the 2023 German Masters in February, White became the first player aged over 60 to reach the last 16 of a ranking event since Charlton in 1992. He then reached the last 16 of the WST Classic in March, beating Judd Trump 4–2 along the way. Despite this upturn in form, White suffered more disappointment in qualifying for the 2023 World Championship, exiting 4–10 to Martin O'Donnell. His performances over the season earned him a new two-year tour card. White won a record fourth World Senior's Championship in May 2023. After defeating Drago in the semi-final, he beat Alfie Burden 5–3 in the final to secure the title.

In April 2025, White failed to qualify for the World Championship for the 19th consecutive year after he suffered a 5–10 loss to Ashley Carty in qualifying. His best result of the 2024–25 season was a run to the last 32 of the Northern Ireland Open. His ranking dropped to 93, which meant he was relegated from the World Snooker Tour. White was then awarded with an invitational tour card for the next two seasons by the sport's governing body. In December 2025, he finished runner-up to Joe Perry at the British Seniors Open after suffering a 5–7 defeat in the final.

White was defeated by Gao Yang in the first round of the 2026 World Snooker Championship qualifiers. White led 5–1, but lost in a deciding frame 9–10.

== Legacy ==
As a six-time runner-up at the World Snooker Championship, White has been labelled 'The People's Champion' by the media, and he is widely regarded as one of the best snooker players to have never been crowned world champion. White's ten ranking event titles place him twelfth on the all-time list of ranking event winners, and he has compiled more than 300 century breaks during his career. White is the most successful player ever at the World Seniors Championship having won a record four titles. He was inducted into the World Snooker Tour Hall of Fame in 2017.

Luke Williams and Paul Gadsby's book Masters of the Baize (2005) included a chapter on White alongside all of the world snooker champions up to that time; the authors wrote that "the Story of the World Snooker Championship would be incomplete without reference to the greatest players never to lift the crown [and] one of the sport's true entertainers". They suggested that White's "appeal transcends all boundaries of age and class", because despite his unpolished behaviour, he played honorably and "never makes excuses for defeat." Brendan Cooper commented in his 2023 book Deep Pockets: Snooker and the Meaning of Life that White "remains, probably, the most popular player in the history of the sport." Cooper attributed this to White combining charisma and humbleness with a fearless style of play and a lack of wins. The snooker historian Clive Everton concluded in 2012 that White's career had been defined not by winning over twenty titles, but by losing six world championship finals, and that White's life "encompassed innumerable pleasures of the moment but not the true fulfilment of his talent."

Steve Davis has called White "one of the greatest underachievers who still achieved", and remarked that although White's technique was imperfect, "talent got over that." Both Hendry and three-time world champion Mark Williams had White as their "hero" when they were young players. He was the first player followed by the young Ronnie O'Sullivan, who went on to be the seven-time world champion. O'Sullivan admired "the way he played, the vulnerability you could sense" and copied White's habit of spinning the cue as he struck the cue ball.

== Personal life ==
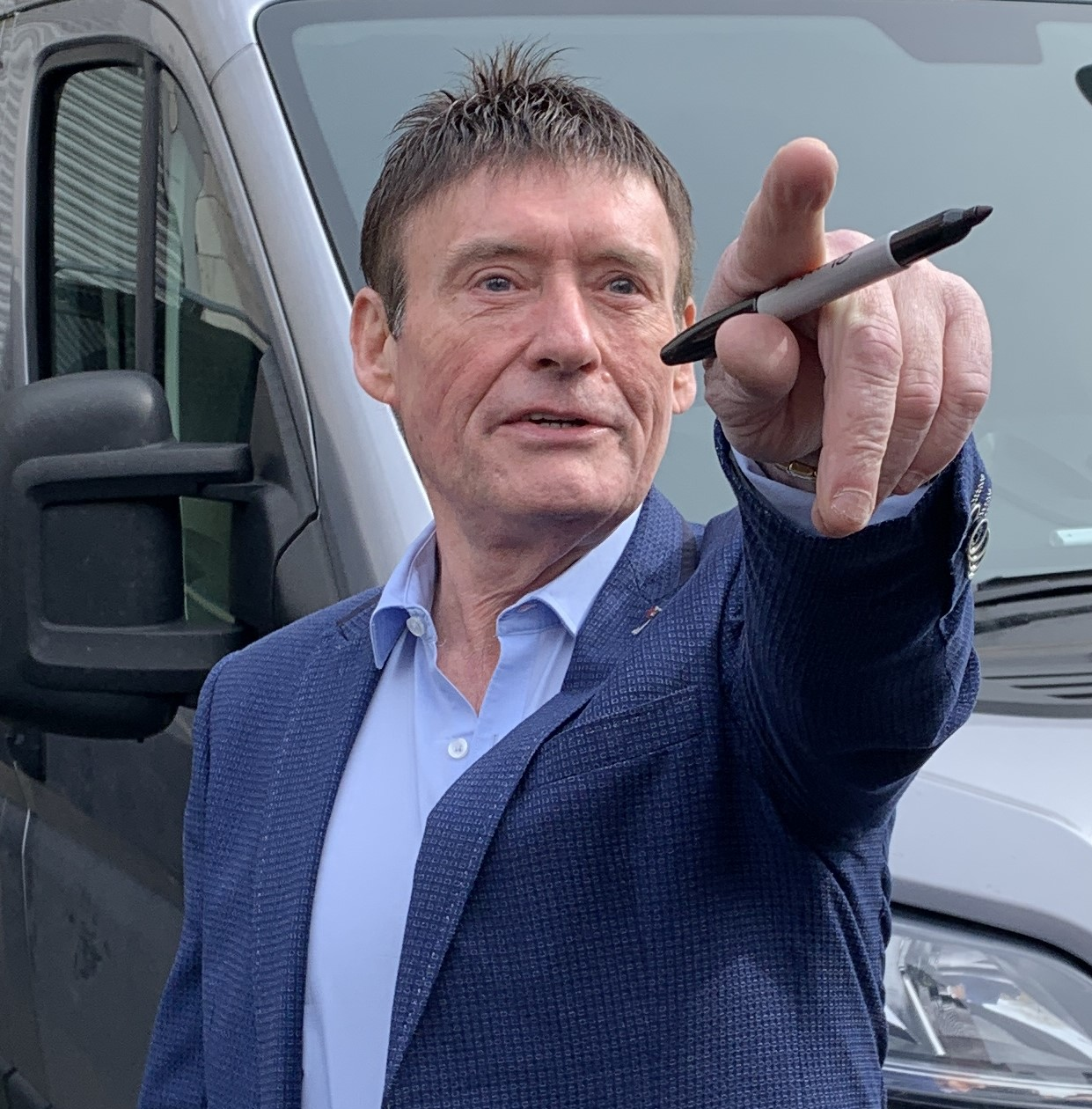
White in Sheffield during the 2024 World Snooker Championship

White has five children with his ex-wife Maureen. His grandson Ralphie Albert is a cricketer who plays for Surrey County Cricket Club. In 2018, White began a relationship with beauty queen Jade Slusarczyk.

His brother Martin died in October 1995 and his mother Lil died just over a year later. In Behind the White Ball: My Autobiography (1998), written with Rosemary Kingsland, White recalled going with friends to retrieve his brother's body from a coffin before the funeral, and bringing it to a table where the group played cards and drank.

In his second autobiography, Second Wind (2014), White revealed that he had been a long-term user of cocaine and had been addicted to crack cocaine during a three-month spell of his career. He said that he went from taking cocaine to crack following his defeat by Davis in the 1984 World Snooker Championship final. White has also shared his experiences with alcohol and gambling issues, estimating that he lost around £2m to gambling alone.

In the late 1990s, White's Bull Terrier, Splinter, was dognapped and held for ransom. Splinter became the first dog to have a colour poster on the front page of The Times. White paid the ransom, and Splinter was returned to him. Splinter went on to live for another three years. In 2017, his apartment in Epsom, England was damaged by a fire with White saying that he had lost "everything" bar his snooker cue which was in his car.

White won the second Poker Million tournament, held in 2003, which also had Steve Davis at the final table. He was good friends with professional poker player, Dave "The Devilfish" Ulliott. White is good friends with the Rolling Stones member Ronnie Wood. The two met as their daughters attended the same school, and White has said that the Rolling Stones performed at his 50th birthday party.

In 2025, White revealed that he had been diagnosed with attention deficit hyperactivity disorder (ADHD) a year or two previously. He wished that he had known about it sooner as he felt it may have impacted his performances. In 2026, he took up residency in Hong Kong.

== In the media ==
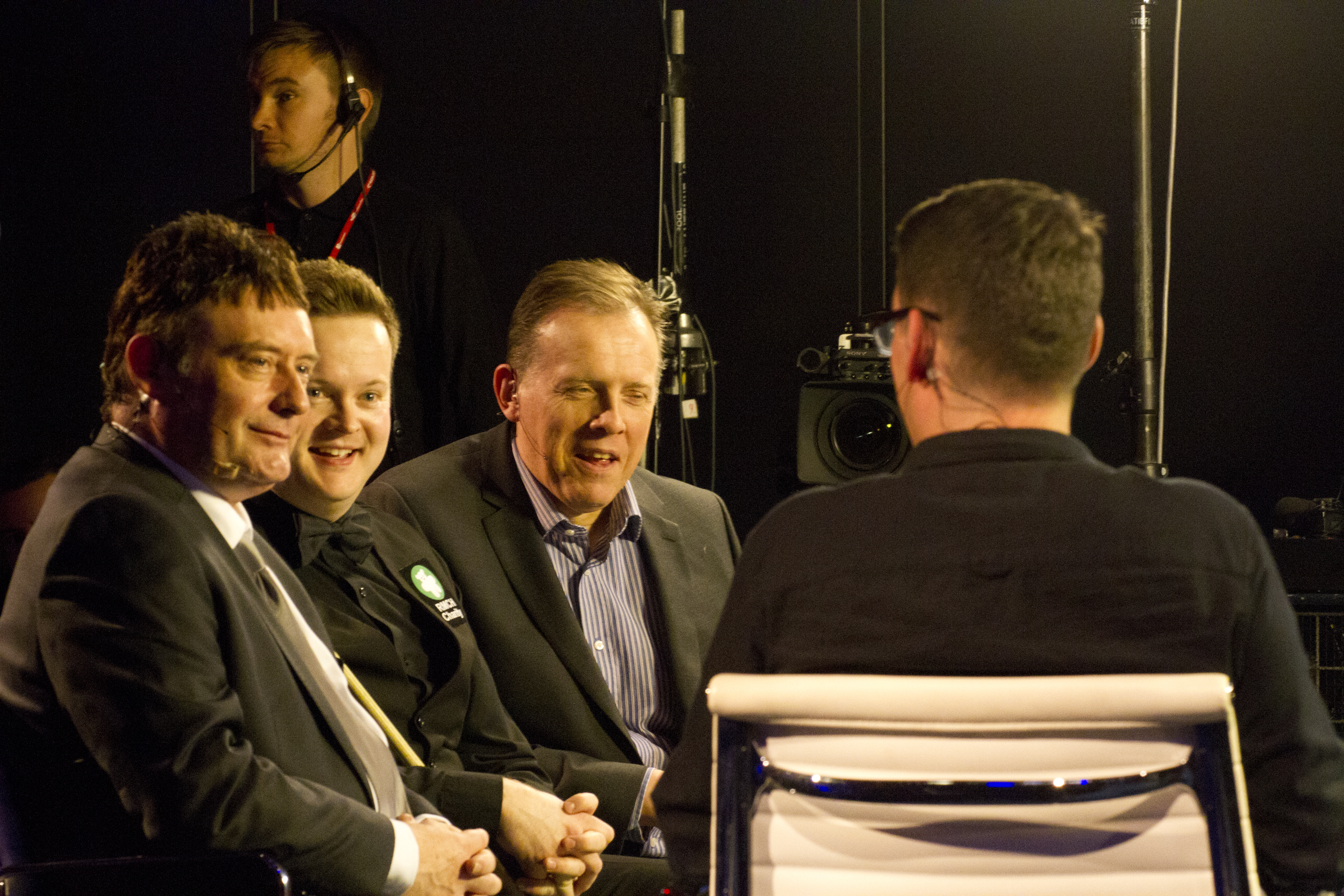
Neal Foulds and Jimmy White (left) in an interview with Shaun Murphy after his victory against Mark Allen at the 2015 German Masters

In 1986, Jimmy White, Alex Higgins, Kirk Stevens, and Tony Knowles teamed up with Status Quo to release a cover version of "The Wanderer" by Dion. The single failed to chart. The following year, after he had signed to Matchroom, White was one of the players who recorded "Romford Rap" with Chas & Dave. It reached number 91 in the charts.

White made an appearance in Stephen Chow's 1990 kung fu and billiards comedy film, Legend of the Dragon. He was a subject of This Is Your Life in 1993. In the British film Jack Said (2009) (a prequel to Jack Says) White played the part of Vic Lee, a snooker club owner. White appeared in the 9th series of I'm a Celebrity...Get Me Out of Here! (2009) and he finished in third place. White was portrayed by James Bailey in the BBC film The Rack Pack (2016), which focused on the rivalry between Alex Higgins and Steve Davis in the 1980s. He was featured in the 2021 BBC documentary series Gods of Snooker, and was the main focus of the last of the three episodes.

His instructional book Jimmy White's Snooker Masterclass (1988), co-written with coach Charles Poole, was aimed at players who had already grasped the basics of the game. On 23 September 2019, White published an apology on his Facebook page to Kirk Stevens, stating that in his autobiography Second Wind he misremembered a few stories as occurring with Kirk Stevens that in fact did not. These events were widely broadcast in the media. White further stated that he did not intend his words to be interpreted as meaning that Kirk Stevens introduced him to crack cocaine or that Stevens ever played WPBSA snooker under the influence of drugs.

White has endorsed four computer games: Jimmy White's 'Whirlwind' Snooker, Jimmy White's 2: Cueball, Jimmy White's Cueball World and Pool Paradise. In Cueball World, White appeared in live-action scenes during the game. He is currently a commentator for snooker coverage on TNT Sports.

== Performance and rankings timeline ==
Tournament	1979/ 80	1980/ 81	1981/ 82	1982/ 83	1983/ 84	1984/ 85	1985/ 86	1986/ 87	1987/ 88	1988/ 89	1989/ 90	1990/ 91	1991/ 92		1992/ 93	1993/ 94	1994/ 95	1995/ 96	1996/ 97	1997/ 98	1998/ 99	1999/ 00	2000/ 01	2001/ 02	2002/ 03	2003/ 04		2004/ 05	2005/ 06	2006/ 07	2007/ 08	2008/ 09	2009/ 10	2010/ 11	2011/ 12	2012/ 13	2013/ 14	2014/ 15	2015/ 16	2016/ 17	2017/ 18	2018/ 19	2019/ 20		2020/ 21	2021/ 22	2022/ 23	2023/ 24	2024/ 25	2025/ 26	2026/ 27
Ranking (Note: It shows the ranking at the beginning of the season)	(Note: He was an amateur)	(Note: New players on the Main Tour do not have a ranking)	21	10	11	7	7	5	2	2	4	4	3		3	3	4	7	13	21	18	16	18	11	10	15		11	8	35	60	65	56	60	55	46	55	64	(Note: Players qualified through European Tour Order of Merit started the season without prize money ranking points)	90	(Note: Players issued an invitational tour card began the season without ranking points)	72			84		90	(Note: Players qualified One Year Ranking List started the season without ranking points)	88		94
Ranking tournaments
Championship League	Tournament Not Held																														Non-Ranking Event														RR	RR	WD	RR	A	WD	A
China Open (Note: The event was called the China International (1997/1998-1998/1999))	Tournament Not Held																			NR	LQ	1R	2R	2R	Not Held			2R	1R	2R	LQ	LQ	LQ	WR	1R	LQ	3R	LQ	LQ	1R	LQ	LQ	Tournament Not Held								LQ
Wuhan Open	Tournament Not Held																																															LQ	1R	1R	LQ
British Open (Note: The event was called the British Gold Cup (1979/1980), the Yamaha Organs Trophy (1980/1981) and the International Masters (1981/1982-1983/1984))	Non-Ranking Event					2R	1R	W	QF	WD	3R	SF	W		SF	3R	3R	2R	1R	1R	2R	1R	F	2R	2R	1R		1R	Tournament Not Held																	2R	LQ	LQ	LQ	LQ	LQ
English Open	Tournament Not Held																																							1R	1R	2R	1R		1R	LQ	LQ	LQ	LQ	LQ	LQ
Shenzhen Open (Note: The event was called the Xi'an Grand Prix (2024/2025–2025/2026))	Tournament Not Held																																																LQ	WD	LQ
Northern Ireland Open	Tournament Not Held																																							2R	3R	1R	1R		1R	LQ	1R	LQ	2R	LQ	LQ
International Championship	Tournament Not Held																																			LQ	1R	1R	LQ	LQ	LQ	1R	LQ		Not Held			LQ	LQ	LQ	1R
UK Championship	Non-Ranking Event					QF	SF	3R	F	1R	QF	QF	F		W	3R	2R	3R	1R	2R	3R	3R	1R	3R	2R	SF		2R	2R	LQ	LQ	LQ	A	1R	LQ	LQ	2R	2R	1R	1R	2R	1R	1R		2R	1R	1R	LQ	LQ	LQ	
Shoot Out	Tournament Not Held											NR	Tournament Not Held																					Non-Ranking Event						3R	2R	3R	1R		2R	1R	1R	1R	1R	1R	
Scottish Open (Note: The event was also called the International Open (1981/1982-1984/1985, 1986/1987-1989/1990 and 1992/1993-1996/1997), the Goya Matchroom Trophy (1985/1986) and the Players Championship (2003/2004))	Not Held		NR	2R	1R	QF	F	1R	3R	F	QF	Not Held			A	SF	SF	1R	QF	3R	2R	1R	1R	QF	3R	W		Tournament Not Held								MR	Not Held			3R	2R	1R	1R		1R	LQ	LQ	2R	LQ	LQ	
German Masters (Note: The event was called the German Open (1995/1996-1997/1998))	Tournament Not Held																	1R	1R	2R	NR	Tournament Not Held												LQ	LQ	LQ	1R	LQ	LQ	1R	LQ	LQ	LQ		LQ	LQ	2R	LQ	LQ	LQ	
Welsh Open	Tournament Not Held												A		QF	QF	2R	2R	1R	2R	2R	SF	LQ	2R	1R	3R		2R	2R	LQ	LQ	1R	LQ	LQ	LQ	LQ	1R	1R	1R	1R	1R	2R	1R		2R	LQ	1R	LQ	LQ	LQ	
World Grand Prix	Tournament Not Held																																					NR	DNQ	DNQ	DNQ	DNQ	DNQ		DNQ	DNQ	DNQ	DNQ	DNQ	DNQ	
Players Championship (Note: The event was called the Players Tour Championship Grand Final (2010/2011-2015/2016))	Tournament Not Held																																	DNQ	DNQ	DNQ	DNQ	DNQ	DNQ	DNQ	DNQ	DNQ	DNQ		DNQ	DNQ	DNQ	DNQ	DNQ	DNQ	
World Open (Note: The event was called the Professional Players Tournament (1982/1983-1983/1984), the Grand Prix (1984/1985-2000/2001 and 2004/2005-2009/2010), and the LG Cup (2001/2002-2003/2004))	Not Held			F	2R	2R	3R	W	2R	QF	3R	SF	1R		W	3R	2R	QF	1R	SF	1R	2R	SF	2R	2R	3R		2R	3R	LQ	LQ	LQ	LQ	1R	LQ	LQ	1R	Not Held		LQ	LQ	LQ	LQ		Not Held			LQ	LQ	LQ	
Tour Championship	Tournament Not Held																																									DNQ	DNQ		DNQ	DNQ	DNQ	DNQ	DNQ	DNQ	
World Championship	A	1R	SF	1R	F	QF	QF	SF	SF	QF	F	F	F		F	F	SF	2R	1R	QF	1R	QF	LQ	2R	2R	1R		2R	1R	LQ	LQ	LQ	LQ	LQ	LQ	LQ	LQ	LQ	LQ	LQ	LQ	LQ	LQ		LQ	LQ	LQ	LQ	LQ	LQ	
Non-ranking tournaments
Champion of Champions	NH	A	Tournament Not Held																																		A	A	A	A	A	A	1R		1R	A	A	1R	A	A	
The Masters	A	A	1R	1R	W	SF	F	1R	QF	QF	SF	SF	SF		SF	1R	SF	QF	1R	WR	WR	QF	QF	SF	QF	SF		SF	1R	WR	LQ	LQ	WR	A	A	A	A	A	A	A	A	A	A		A	A	A	A	A	A	
Championship League	Tournament Not Held																														RR	A	A	A	A	A	A	A	A	A	A	A	A		A	A	A	A	A	A	
World Seniors Championship	Tournament Not Held												A		Tournament Not Held																			W	SF	QF	QF	1R	SF	A	Not Held		W	W	F	F	W	QF	1R	2R	
Former ranking tournaments
Canadian Masters (Note: The tournament was called the Canadian Open (1979/1980–1980/1981))	Non-Ranking		Tournament Not Held				Non-Ranking Event			W	Tournament Not Held																																								
Classic	Non-Ranking Event				2R	2R	W	F	3R	1R	WD	W	3R		Tournament Not Held																																				
Asian Classic (Note: The event was called the Dubai Masters (1988/1989), the Dubai Classic (1989/1990-1994/1995) and the Thailand Classic (1995/1996))	Tournament Not Held									NR	A	2R	2R		3R	2R	2R	2R	1R	Tournament Not Held																															
Malta Grand Prix	Tournament Not Held																Non-Ranking Event					2R	NR	Tournament Not Held																											
Thailand Masters (Note: The event was called the Asian Open (1989/1990-1992/1993) and the Thailand Open (1993/1994-1996/1997))	Tournament Not Held				Non-Ranking Event				Not Held		1R	2R	1R		SF	SF	1R	2R	2R	1R	LQ	2R	1R	2R	NR	Tournament Not Held				NR	Tournament Not Held																				
Irish Masters	Non-Ranking Event																								1R	2R		2R	NH	NR	Tournament Not Held																				
Northern Ireland Trophy (Note: The tournament was called the Northern Ireland Classic (1981/1982))	Not Held		NR	Tournament Not Held																									NR	LQ	LQ	1R	Tournament Not Held																		
Bahrain Championship	Tournament Not Held																															LQ	Tournament Not Held																		
Wuxi Classic (Note: The event was called the Jiangsu Classic (2008/2009-2009/2010))	Tournament Not Held																															Non-Ranking Event				LQ	1R	LQ	Tournament Not Held												
Australian Goldfields Open (Note: The event was also called the Australian Masters (1979/1980-1987/1988 and 1995/1996), the Hong Kong Open (1989/1990) and the Australian Open (1994/1995-1995/1996))	Non-Ranking Event									NH	SF	Tournament Not Held					Non-Ranking		Tournament Not Held																LQ	WD	LQ	LQ	LQ	Tournament Not Held											
Shanghai Masters	Tournament Not Held																														LQ	1R	LQ	LQ	LQ	LQ	LQ	LQ	LQ	LQ	LQ	Non-Ranking			Not Held			Non-Ranking Event			
Paul Hunter Classic (Note: The event was called the Grand Prix Fürth (2004/2005) and the Fürth German Open (2005/2006-2006/2007))	Tournament Not Held																											Pro-am Event						Minor-Ranking Event						QF	1R	A	NR		Tournament Not Held						
Indian Open	Tournament Not Held																																				LQ	LQ	NH	1R	LQ	LQ	Tournament Not Held								
Riga Masters (Note: The event was called the Riga Open (2014/2015-2015/2016))	Tournament Not Held																																					Minor-Rank		A	3R	1R	LQ		Tournament Not Held						
China Championship	Tournament Not Held																																							NR	LQ	LQ	LQ		Tournament Not Held						
WST Pro Series	Tournament Not Held																																												RR	Tournament Not Held					
Turkish Masters	Tournament Not Held																																													LQ	Tournament Not Held				
Gibraltar Open	Tournament Not Held																																						MR	2R	2R	2R	WD		4R	2R	Tournament Not Held				
WST Classic	Tournament Not Held																																														4R	Tournament Not Held			
European Masters (Note: The event was called the European Open (1988/1989-1996/1997 and 2001/2002-2003/2004), the Irish Open (1998/1999), and the Malta Cup (2004/2005-2007/2008))	Tournament Not Held									SF	3R	1R	W		1R	SF	WD	1R	2R	NH	1R	Not Held		QF	1R	F		1R	2R	LQ	NR	Tournament Not Held								LQ	LQ	LQ	LQ		1R	LQ	1R	LQ	Not Held		
Saudi Arabia Masters	Tournament Not Held																																																3R	1R	NH
Former non-ranking tournaments
Scottish Open	Not Held		LQ	Ranking Event								Not Held			Ranking Event													Tournament Not Held								MR	Not Held			Ranking Event											
Classic	A	A	A	1R	Ranking Event										Tournament Not Held																																				
Pontins Brean Sands	Not Held			RR	Tournament Not Held																																														
UK Championship	A	LQ	SF	QF	SF	Ranking Event																																													
British Open	A	RR	RR	F	RR	Ranking Event																							Tournament Not Held																	Ranking Event					
Tolly Cobbold Classic	A	A	QF	QF	QF	Tournament Not Held																																													
Belgian Classic	Tournament Not Held						QF	Tournament Not Held																																											
Tokyo Masters	Tournament Not Held								SF	Tournament Not Held																																									
Canadian Masters	2R	2R	Tournament Not Held				QF	QF	F	R	Tournament Not Held																																								
English Professional Championship	NH	A	Not Held			QF	QF	2R	2R	A	Tournament Not Held																																								
Dubai Masters	Tournament Not Held									QF	Ranking Event										Tournament Not Held																														
Matchroom Professional Championship	Tournament Not Held							A	2R	SF	Tournament Not Held																																								
Carlsberg Challenge	Tournament Not Held					W	W	F	A	A	Tournament Not Held																																								
Hong Kong Gold Cup	Tournament Not Held										RR	Tournament Not Held																																							
International League	Tournament Not Held										F	Tournament Not Held																																							
New Zealand Masters	Tournament Not Held					W	Not Held			A	A	Tournament Not Held																																							
Norwich Union Grand Prix	Tournament Not Held									F	A	QF	Tournament Not Held																																						
World Masters	Tournament Not Held											W	Tournament Not Held																																						
London Masters	Tournament Not Held									SF	QF	SF	Tournament Not Held																																						
European Masters League	Tournament Not Held												RR		Tournament Not Held																																				
Indian Challenge	Tournament Not Held												QF		Tournament Not Held																																				
Belgian Challenge	Tournament Not Held												SF		Tournament Not Held																																				
Kent Classic (Note: The event was also called the Kent Cup (1986/1987–1987/1988 & 1989/1990–1990/1991))	Tournament Not Held							F	A	A	A	A	NH		QF	Tournament Not Held																																			
World Matchplay	Tournament Not Held									SF	W	W	SF		QF	Tournament Not Held																																			
European Challenge	Tournament Not Held												W	QF	QF	Tournament Not Held																																			
Belgian Masters	Tournament Not Held											F	SF		QF	Not Held		A	Tournament Not Held																																
Malaysian Masters	Tournament Not Held					A	NH	W	Tournament Not Held									A	Tournament Not Held																																
Australian Goldfields Open	A	A	A	A	QF	QF	SF	QF	A	NH	R	Tournament Not Held					A	A	Tournament Not Held																Ranking Event					Tournament Not Held											
Superstar International	Tournament Not Held																			F	Tournament Not Held																														
China Open	Tournament Not Held																			F	Ranking Event				Not Held			Ranking Event															Tournament Not Held								
Pontins Professional	A	A	A	A	A	A	A	A	A	A	A	A	A		A	A	A	A	A	A	W	F	Tournament Not Held																												
Malta Grand Prix	Tournament Not Held																A	A	A	A	QF	R	A	Tournament Not Held																											
Champions Cup (Note: The event was called the Charity Challenge (1994/1995–1998/1999))	Tournament Not Held																1R	QF	1R	QF	SF	RR	RR	RR	Tournament Not Held																										
Scottish Masters	Not Held		W	QF	QF	F	SF	SF	SF	NH	QF	SF	QF		QF	QF	QF	1R	1R	1R	QF	1R	1R	1R	QF	Tournament Not Held																									
Northern Ireland Trophy	Not Held		W	Tournament Not Held																									LQ	Ranking Event			Tournament Not Held																		
Thailand Masters	Tournament Not Held				A	W	A	A	Not Held		Ranking		QF		Ranking Event										A	Not Held				A	Tournament Not Held																				
Irish Masters	A	A	A	QF	1R	W	W	QF	QF	QF	SF	SF	QF		QF	SF	QF	1R	QF	1R	SF	QF	1R	1R	Ranking Event				NH	RR	Tournament Not Held																				
Euro-Asia Masters Challenge	Tournament Not Held																									RR	SF	Not Held			A	Tournament Not Held																			
Pot Black	A	A	A	SF	SF	F	W	Tournament Not Held					SF		QF	A	Tournament Not Held												QF	A	A	Tournament Not Held																			
World Series Grand Final	Tournament Not Held																															2R	Tournament Not Held																		
World Series Killarney	Tournament Not Held																																F	Tournament Not Held																	
World Series Prague	Tournament Not Held																																W	Tournament Not Held																	
Legends of Snooker	Tournament Not Held																																QF	Tournament Not Held																	
Power Snooker	Tournament Not Held																																	QF	A	Tournament Not Held															
Premier League (Note: The event was also called the Professional Snooker League (1983/1984), Matchroom League (1986/1987 to 1991/1992) and the European League (1992/1993 to 1996/1997))	Tournament Not Held				RR	Not Held		RR	RR	RR	RR	RR	SF		W	SF	SF	RR	RR	F	F	RR	RR	SF	RR	RR		RR	RR	F	RR	A	A	A	RR	A	Tournament Not Held														
General Cup (Note: The event was called the General Cup International (2004/2005–2011/2012))	Tournament Not Held																											A	Tournament Not Held				A	NH	A	A	A	RR	A	Tournament Not Held											
Shoot Out	Tournament Not Held											WD	Tournament Not Held																					1R	1R	1R	1R	2R	A	Ranking Event											
Seniors Irish Masters	Tournament Not Held																																									W	Tournament Not Held								
Seniors 6-Red World Championship	Tournament Not Held																																									W	Tournament Not Held								
Seniors Masters	Tournament Not Held																																								A	QF	Tournament Not Held								
UK Seniors Championship	Tournament Not Held																																								W	QF	F		Tournament Not Held						
Hong Kong Masters (Note: The event was also called the Hong Kong Challenge (1990/1991–1991/1992))	Tournament Not Held				A	QF	A	QF	SF	W	NH	F	SF		Tournament Not Held																										A	Tournament Not Held					A	Tournament Not Held			
Six-red World Championship (Note: The event was also called the Six-red Snooker International (2008/2009) and the Six-red World Grand Prix (2009/2010))	Tournament Not Held																															2R	W	2R	NH	2R	2R	RR	A	A	A	A	2R		Not Held		RR	Tournament Not Held			

Performance Table Legend
LQ	lost in the qualifying draw	#R	lost in the early rounds of the tournament (WR = Wildcard round, RR = Round robin)	QF	lost in the quarter-finals
SF	lost in the semi-finals	F	lost in the final	W	won the tournament
DNQ	did not qualify for the tournament	A	did not participate in the tournament	WD	withdrew from the tournament

NH / Not Held	means an event was not held.
NR / Non-Ranking Event	means an event is/was no longer a ranking event.
R / Ranking Event	means an event is/was a ranking event.
MR / Minor-Ranking Event	means an event is/was a minor-ranking event.
PA / Pro-am Event	means an event is/was a pro-am event.

== Career finals ==
=== Ranking finals: 24 (10 titles) ===
Legend
World Championship (0–6)
UK Championship (1–2)
Other (9–6)

Ranking finals
Outcome	No.	Year	Championship	Opponent in the final	Score
Runner-up	1.	1982	Professional Players Tournament	Ray Reardon (WAL)	5–10
Runner-up	2.	1984	World Snooker Championship	Steve Davis (ENG)	16–18
Runner-up	3.	1985	Matchroom Trophy	Cliff Thorburn (CAN)	10–12
Winner	1.	1986	The Classic	Cliff Thorburn (CAN)	13–12
Winner	2.	1986	Grand Prix	Rex Williams (ENG)	10–6
Runner-up	4.	1987	The Classic	Steve Davis (ENG)	12–13
Winner	3.	1987	British Open	Neal Foulds (ENG)	13–9
Runner-up	5.	1987	UK Championship	Steve Davis (ENG)	14–16
Runner-up	6.	1988	International Open (2)	Steve Davis (ENG)	6–12
Winner	4.	1988	Canadian Masters	Steve Davis (ENG)	9–4
Runner-up	7.	1990	World Snooker Championship (2)	Stephen Hendry (SCO)	12–18
Winner	5.	1991	The Classic (2)	Stephen Hendry (SCO)	10–4
Runner-up	8.	1991	World Snooker Championship (3)	John Parrott (ENG)	11–18
Runner-up	9.	1991	UK Championship (2)	John Parrott (ENG)	13–16
Winner	6.	1992	European Open	Mark Johnston-Allen (ENG)	9–3
Winner	7.	1992	British Open (2)	James Wattana (THA)	10–7
Runner-up	10.	1992	World Snooker Championship (4)	Stephen Hendry (SCO)	14–18
Winner	8.	1992	Grand Prix (2)	Ken Doherty (IRL)	10–9
Winner	9.	1992	UK Championship	John Parrott (ENG)	16–9
Runner-up	11.	1993	World Snooker Championship (5)	Stephen Hendry (SCO)	5–18
Runner-up	12.	1994	World Snooker Championship (6)	Stephen Hendry (SCO)	17–18
Runner-up	13.	2000	British Open	Peter Ebdon (ENG)	6–9
Runner-up	14.	2004	European Open	Stephen Maguire (SCO)	3–9
Winner	10.	2004	Players Championship	Paul Hunter (ENG)	9–7

=== Non-ranking finals: 38 (20 titles) ===
Legend
The Masters (1–1)
Premier League (1–3)
Other (18–14)

Non-ranking finals contested by Jimmy White
Outcome	No.	Year	Championship	Opponent in the final	Score	Ref.
Winner	1.	1981	Scottish Masters	Cliff Thorburn (CAN)	9–4	
Winner	2.	1981	Northern Ireland Classic	Steve Davis (ENG)	11–9	
Runner-up	1.	1983	International Masters	Ray Reardon (WAL)	6–9	
Winner	3.	1984	The Masters	Terry Griffiths (WAL)	9–5	
Winner	4.	1984	New Zealand Masters	Kirk Stevens (CAN)	5–3	
Winner	5.	1984	Thailand Masters	Terry Griffiths (WAL)	4–3	
Winner	6.	1984	Carlsberg Challenge	Tony Knowles (ENG)	9–7	
Runner-up	2.	1984	Scottish Masters	Steve Davis (ENG)	4–9	
Runner-up	3.	1985	Pot Black	Doug Mountjoy (WAL)	0–2	
Winner	7.	1985	Irish Masters	Alex Higgins (NIR)	9–5	
Winner	8.	1985	Carlsberg Challenge (2)	Alex Higgins (NIR)	8–3	
Winner	9.	1986	Pot Black	Kirk Stevens (CAN)	2–0	
Runner-up	4.	1986	The Masters	Cliff Thorburn (CAN)	5–9	
Winner	10.	1986	Irish Masters (2)	Willie Thorne (ENG)	9–5	
Winner	11.	1986	Malaysian Masters	Dennis Taylor (NIR)	2–1	
Runner-up	5.	1986	Carlsberg Challenge	Dennis Taylor (NIR)	3–8	
Runner-up	6.	1987	Kent Cup	Willie Thorne (ENG)	2–5	
Runner-up	7.	1987	Canadian Masters	Dennis Taylor (NIR)	7–9	
Winner	12.	1988	Hong Kong Masters	Neal Foulds (ENG)	6–3	
Runner-up	8.	1988	Norwich Union Grand Prix	Steve Davis (ENG)	4–5	
Winner	13.	1989	World Matchplay	John Parrott (ENG)	18–9	
Runner-up	9.	1990	Matchroom International League	Tony Meo (ENG)	Round-Robin	
Runner-up	10.	1990	World Series Challenge	James Wattana (THA)	3–9	
Runner-up	11.	1990	Belgian Masters	John Parrott (ENG)	6–9	
Winner	14.	1990	World Matchplay (2)	Stephen Hendry (SCO)	18–9	
Winner	15.	1991	World Masters	Tony Drago (MLT)	10–6	
Winner	16.	1991	European Challenge	Steve Davis (ENG)	4–1	
Winner	17.	1993	European League	Alan McManus (SCO)	10–7	
Runner-up	12.	1997	Superstar International	Ronnie O'Sullivan (ENG)	3–5	
Runner-up	13.	1997	China International	Steve Davis (ENG)	4–7	
Runner-up	14.	1998	Premier League	Ken Doherty (IRL)	2–10	
Runner-up	15.	1999	Premier League (2)	John Higgins (SCO)	4–9	
Winner	18.	1999	Pontins Professional	Matthew Stevens (WAL)	9–5	
Runner-up	16.	2000	Pontins Professional	Darren Morgan (WAL)	2–9	
Runner-up	17.	2006	Premier League (3)	Ronnie O'Sullivan (ENG)	0–7	
Runner-up	18.	2009	World Series of Snooker Killarney	Shaun Murphy (ENG)	1–5	
Winner	19.	2009	Six-red World Grand Prix	Barry Hawkins (ENG)	8–6	
Winner	20.	2009	World Series of Snooker Prague	Graeme Dott (SCO)	5–3	

=== Seniors finals: 11 (7 titles) ===
Seniors finals contested by Jimmy White
Outcome	No.	Year	Championship	Opponent in the final	Score	Ref.
Winner	1.	2010	World Seniors Championship	Steve Davis (ENG)	4–1	
Winner	2.	2017	UK Seniors Championship	Ken Doherty (IRL)	4–2	
Winner	3.	2019	Seniors Irish Masters	Rodney Goggins (IRL)	4–1	
Winner	4.	2019	Seniors 6-Red World Championship	Aaron Canavan (JER)	4–2	
Winner	5.	2019	World Seniors Championship (2)	Darren Morgan (WAL)	5–3	
Runner-up	1.	2019	UK Seniors Championship	Michael Judge (IRL)	2–4	
Winner	6.	2020	World Seniors Championship (3)	Ken Doherty (IRL)	5–4	
Runner-up	2.	2021	World Seniors Championship	David Lilley (ENG)	3–5	
Runner-up	3.	2022	World Seniors Championship (2)	Lee Walker (WAL)	4–5	
Winner	7.	2023	World Seniors Championship (4)	Alfie Burden (ENG)	5–3	
Runner-up	4.	2025	British Seniors Open	Joe Perry (ENG)	5–7	

=== Pro-am finals: 7 (1 title) ===
Pro-am finals contested by Jimmy White
Outcome	No.	Year	Championship	Opponent in the final	Score	Ref.
Winner	1.	1978	Pontins Autumn Open	Sid Hood (ENG)	7–6	
Runner-up	1.	1979	Pontins Spring Open	Steve Davis (ENG)	3–7	
Runner-up	2.	1979	Warners Open	Tony Meo (ENG)	2–5	
Runner-up	3.	2004	Swiss Open	Ian McCulloch (ENG)	1–5	
Runner-up	4.	2009	Paul Hunter Classic	Shaun Murphy (ENG)	0–4	
Runner-up	5.	2010	Pink Ribbon	Michael Holt (ENG)	5–6	
Runner-up	6.	2011	Cricket Club of India Open Invitational	Stephen Lee (ENG)	7–10	

=== Team finals: 7 (4 titles) ===
Team finals contested by Jimmy White
Outcome	No.	Year	Championship	Team/partner	Opponent(s) in the final	Score	Ref.
Runner-up	1.	1982	World Team Classic	England	Canada	2–4	
Runner-up	2.	1983	World Doubles Championship	Tony Knowles (ENG)	Steve Davis (ENG); Tony Meo (ENG)	2–10	
Winner	1.	1984	World Doubles Championship	Alex Higgins (NIR)	Cliff Thorburn (ENG); Willie Thorne (ENG)	10–2	
Winner	2.	1988	World Cup	England	Australia	9–7	
Winner	3.	1989	World Cup (2)	England	Rest of the world	9–8	
Runner-up	3.	1991	World Masters	Caroline Walch (ENG)	Steve Davis (ENG); Allison Fisher (ENG)	3–6	
Winner	4.	2000	Nations Cup	England	Wales	6–4	

=== Amateur finals: 6 (5 titles) ===
Amateur finals contested by Jimmy White
Outcome	No.	Year	Championship	Opponent in the final	Score	Ref.
Winner	1.	1977	British Under-16 Championship	David Bonney (ENG)	3–2	
Runner-up	1.	1977	Pontins Junior Championship	Tony Meo (ENG)	2–3	
Winner	2.	1978	Pontins Junior Championship	John Bennett (WAL)	3–2	
Winner	3.	1979	English Amateur Championship	Dave Martin (ENG)	13–10	
Winner	4.	1980	World Amateur Championship	Ron Atkins (AUS)	11–2	
Winner	5.	1980	Indian Amateur Championship	Arvind Savur (IND)	9–7	
