= 1998 Premier League Snooker =

Doc Martens Premier League
Tournament information
- Dates: 3 January – 24 May 1998
- Venue: Diamond Centre
- City: Irthlingborough
- Country: England
- Organisation: Matchroom Sport
- Format: Non-ranking event
- Winner's share: £60,000
- Highest break: (Scotland) Stephen Hendry (147)

Final
- Champion: (Republic of Ireland) Ken Doherty
- Runner-up: (England) Jimmy White
- Score: 10–2

The 1998 Doc Martens Premier League was a professional non-ranking snooker tournament that was played from 3 January to 24 May 1998. All matches including the play-offs were played at the Diamond Centre at Irthlingborough.

Ken Doherty won in the final 10–2 against Jimmy White. Stephen Hendry made a maximum break in the semi-finals against Doherty.

== League phase ==
Ranking		(Scotland) HIG	(Scotland) HEN	(Republic of Ireland) DOH	(England) WHI	(England) OSU	(England) DAV	(Wales) WIL	Frame W-L	Match W-D-L	Pld-Pts
1	John Higgins	x	4	4	7	6	8	7	36–12	4–2–0	6–10
2	Stephen Hendry	4	x	6	5	4	7	6	32–16	4–2–0	6–10
3	Ken Doherty	4	2	x	2	7	5	6	26–22	3–1–2	6–7
4	Jimmy White	1	3	6	x	5	3	4	22–26	2–1–3	6–5
5	Ronnie O'Sullivan	2	4	1	3	x	4	5	19–48	1–2–3	6–4
6	Steve Davis	0	1	3	5	4	x	4	17–48	1–2–3	6–4
7	Mark Williams	1	2	2	4	3	4	x	16–48	0–2–4	6–2

Top four qualified for the play-offs. If points were level then most frames won determined their positions. If two players had an identical record then the result in their match determined their positions. If that ended 4–4 then the player who got to four first was higher.

- 3 January Match Day 1
  - Stephen Hendry 6–2 Mark Williams
  - Steve Davis 5–3 Jimmy White
  - Ken Doherty 6–2 Mark Williams
- 4 January Match Day 2
  - John Higgins 7–1 Jimmy White
  - Stephen Hendry 7–1 Steve Davis
- 10 January Match Day 3
  - John Higgins 7–1 Mark Williams
  - Stephen Hendry 5–3 Jimmy White
  - Ken Doherty 7–1 Ronnie O'Sullivan
- 11 January Match Day 4
  - Mark Williams 4–4 Steve Davis
  - Jimmy White 6–2 Ken Doherty
  - John Higgins 6–2 Ronnie O'Sullivan?
- 31 January? Match Day 5
  - Stephen Hendry 6–2 Ken Doherty
  - Ronnie O'Sullivan 5–3 Mark Williams
- 1 February? Match Day 6
  - Jimmy White 5–3 Ronnie O'Sullivan
  - Ken Doherty 5–3 Steve Davis
  - Stephen Hendry 4–4 John Higgins
- 9 May Match Day 7
  - John Higgins 4–4 Ken Doherty
  - Steve Davis 4–4 Ronnie O'Sullivan
- 10 May Match Day 8
  - Mark Williams 4–4 Jimmy White
  - Stephen Hendry 4–4 Ronnie O'Sullivan
  - John Higgins 8–0 Steve Davis

== Play-offs ==
23–24 May (Diamond Centre, Irthlingborough, England)

Semi-finals; Best of 11 frames
1	(Scotland) John Higgins	3
4	(England) Jimmy White	6
2	(Scotland) Stephen Hendry	5
3	(Republic of Ireland) Ken Doherty	6

Final; Best of 19 frames
4	(England) Jimmy White	2
3	(Republic of Ireland) Ken Doherty	10
