= 1999 Pontins Professional =

Tournament information
- Dates: 15–22 May 1999
- Venue: Pontin's
- City: Prestatyn
- Country: Wales
- Organisation: WPBSA
- Format: Non-Ranking event
- Highest break: (England) Jimmy White (134)

Final
- Champion: (England) Jimmy White
- Runner-up: (Wales) Matthew Stevens
- Score: 9–5

The 1999 Pontins Professional was the twenty-sixth edition of the professional invitational snooker tournament which took place in May 1999 in Prestatyn, Wales.

The tournament featured eight professional players. The quarter-final matches were contested over the best of 9 frames, the semi-finals best of eleven and the final best of seventeen.

Jimmy White won the event, beating Matthew Stevens 9–5 in the final.

== Main draw ==
Quarter-finals; Best of 9 frames
(Wales) Mark Williams	5
(England) Mike Hallett	1
(England) Jimmy White	5
(Wales) Darren Morgan	2
(Wales) Matthew Stevens	5
(Republic of Ireland) Ken Doherty	4
(England) Stephen Lee	5
(England) Paul Hunter	4

Semi-finals; Best of 11 frames
(Wales) Mark Williams	4
(England) Jimmy White	6
(Wales) Matthew Stevens	6
(England) Stephen Lee	5

Final; Best of 17 frames
(England) Jimmy White	9
(Wales) Matthew Stevens	5

== Final ==
Final: Best of 17 frames. Referee: unknown. Pontins, Prestatyn, Wales, 22 May 1999.
Jimmy White; England	9–5	Matthew Stevens; Wales
81(81)–1, 19–68, 45–72(72), 79(71)–8, 83–0, 16–64(60), 68–4, 134(134)–0, 40–65(55), 0–86(50), 64–36, 84–2, 94(94)–0, 60–6
134	Highest break	72
1	Century breaks	0
4	50+ breaks	4

== Century breaks ==
- 134 – Jimmy White
- 102 – Matthew Stevens
- 100 – Mark Williams
