= 1990 World Matchplay (snooker) =

World Matchplay
Tournament information
- Dates: 6–15 December 1990
- Venue: International Centre
- City: Brentwood
- Country: England
- Format: Non-ranking event
- Total prize fund: £200,000
- Winner's share: £70,000
- Highest break: Stephen Hendry (SCO) (142)

Final
- Champion: (England) Jimmy White
- Runner-up: (Scotland) Stephen Hendry
- Score: 18–9

The 1990 Coalite World Matchplay was a professional non-ranking snooker tournament, which took place from 6 to 15 December 1990 at the International Centre in Brentwood, England.

Jimmy White won the event for the second year running, defeating Stephen Hendry 18–9 in the final.

== Prize fund ==
The breakdown of prize money for this year is shown below:

- Winner: £70,000
- Runner-up: £30,000
- Semi-final: £17,500
- Quarter-final: £10,000
- Round 1: £5,000
- Highest break: £5,000
- Total: £200,000

== Main draw ==
Round 1 Best of 17 frames
(England) Gary Wilkinson	9
(England) Mike Hallett	7
(Wales) Terry Griffiths	9
(England) Steve James	6
(England) Dean Reynolds	9
(England) Neal Foulds	2
(England) Martin Clark	9
(Wales) Doug Mountjoy	1

Quarter-finals; Best of 17 frames
(England) Jimmy White	9
(England) Gary Wilkinson	6
(England) John Parrott	8
(Wales) Terry Griffiths	9
(Scotland) Stephen Hendry	9
(England) Dean Reynolds	8
(England) Steve Davis	9
(England) Martin Clark	5

Semi-finals; Best of 17 frames
(England) Jimmy White	9
(Wales) Terry Griffiths	2
(Scotland) Stephen Hendry	9
(England) Steve Davis	6

Final; Best of 35 frames
(England) Jimmy White	18
(Scotland) Stephen Hendry	9

== Final ==
Final: Best of 35 frames. Referee: Len Ganley; Brentwood Centre, Brentwood, England, 14 & 15 December 1990.
Jimmy White; England	18–9	Stephen Hendry; Scotland
First session: 64–20, 66–56 (66 White, 56 Hendry), 31-73, 48-84 (80), 56–6, 84–1, 78–54 (58 White, 54 Hendry); Second session:67–24, 69–44, 30-106 (93), 0–142 (142), 24-70, 2-133 (80), 71–11, 85(53)-37, 82-0 (82), Third session: 67-55, 54–77 (72), 77-8, 69–58, 94-37 (94), 101 (50)-24, 65 (52)-57, 68 (51)-25; Fourth session: 0-79 (59), 41-87 (51), 68-47
94	Highest break	142
0	Century breaks	1
8	50+ breaks	9
