= 1999 Premier League Snooker =

Riley Premier League
Tournament information
- Dates: 2 January – 16 May 1999
- Country: United Kingdom
- Organisation: Matchroom Sport
- Format: Non-ranking event

Final
- Champion: (Scotland) John Higgins
- Runner-up: (England) Jimmy White
- Score: 9–4

The 1999 Riley Premier League was a professional non-ranking snooker tournament that was played from 2 January to 16 May 1999.

John Higgins won in the final 9–4 against Jimmy White.

== League phase ==
| Ranking | | (England) OSU | (Wales) WIL | (Scotland) HIG | (England) WHI | (Republic of Ireland) DOH | (Scotland) HEN | (England) DAV | Frame W-L | Match W-D-L | Pld-Pts |
|---|---|---|---|---|---|---|---|---|---|---|---|
| 1 | Ronnie O'Sullivan | x | 4 | 5 | 4 | 6 | 6 | 6 | 31–17 | 4–2–0 | 6–10 |
| 2 | Mark Williams | 4 | x | 4 | 5 | 5 | 5 | 5 | 28–20 | 4–2–0 | 6–10 |
| 3 | John Higgins | 3 | 4 | x | 4 | 6 | 3 | 6 | 26–22 | 2–2–2 | 6–6 |
| 4 | Jimmy White | 4 | 3 | 4 | x | 4 | 5 | 3 | 23–25 | 1–3–2 | 6–5 |
| 5 | Ken Doherty | 2 | 3 | 2 | 4 | x | 6 | 4 | 21–27 | 1–2–3 | 6–4 |
| 6 | Stephen Hendry | 3 | 2 | 2 | 4 | 3 | x | 4 | 21–26 | 2–0–4 | 6–4 |
| 7 | Steve Davis | 2 | 3 | 2 | 5 | 4 | 2 | x | 18–30 | 1–1–4 | 6–3 |

Top four qualified for the play-offs. If points were level then most frames won determined their positions. If two players had an identical record then the result in their match determined their positions. If that ended 4–4 then the player who got to four first was higher.

- Match Day 1 – Torbay Leisure Centre, Paignton (2 January 1999)
  - Mark Williams 5–3 Steve Davis
  - Jimmy White 4–4 Ronnie O'Sullivan
- Match Day 2 – Torbay Leisure Centre, Paignton (3 January 1999)
  - Ronnie O'Sullivan 4–4 Mark Williams
  - Jimmy White 4–4 Ken Doherty
  - Stephen Hendry 5–3 John Higgins
- Match Day 3 – Park Leisure Centre, Barrow (9 January 1999)
  - Ronnie O'Sullivan 6–2 Ken Doherty
  - John Higgins 4–4 Mark Williams
  - Stephen Hendry 6–2 Steve Davis
- Match Day 4 – Park Leisure Centre, Barrow (10 January 1999)
  - Mark Williams 5–3 Ken Doherty
  - John Higgins 6–2 Steve Davis
  - Ronnie O'Sullivan 6–2 Stephen Hendry
- Match Day 5 – North Kesteven Sports Centre, North Hykeham, Lincolnshire (6 February 1999)
  - Jimmy White 4–4 John Higgins
  - Jimmy White 5–3 Stephen Hendry
- Match Day 6 – North Kesteven Sports Centre, North Hykeham (7 February 1999)
  - John Higgins 6–2 Ken Doherty
  - Ken Doherty 6–2 Stephen Hendry
  - Ronnie O'Sullivan 6–2 Steve Davis
- Match Day 7 – Cleethorpes Leisure Centre, Cleethorpes (8 May 1999)
  - Mark Williams 5–3 Stephen Hendry
  - Steve Davis 5–3 Jimmy White
- Match Day 8 – Cleethorpes Leisure Centre, Cleethorpes (9 May 1999)
  - Steve Davis 4–4 Ken Doherty
  - Mark Williams 5–3 Jimmy White
  - Ronnie O'Sullivan 5–3 John Higgins

== Play-offs ==
15–16 May – Magnet Leisure Centre, Maidenhead, England

Semi-finals; Best of 11 frames
1 | (England) Ronnie O'Sullivan | 1
4 | (England) Jimmy White | 6
2 | (Wales) Mark Williams | 2
3 | (Scotland) John Higgins | 6

Final; Best of 17 frames
4 | (England) Jimmy White | 4
3 | (Scotland) John Higgins | 9
