= 1989 World Matchplay (snooker) =

World Matchplay
Tournament information
- Dates: 7–16 December 1989
- Venue: International Centre
- City: Brentwood
- Country: England
- Format: Non-ranking event
- Total prize fund: £250,000
- Winner's share: £100,000
- Highest break: Stephen Hendry (SCO) (129)

Final
- Champion: (England) Jimmy White
- Runner-up: (England) John Parrott
- Score: 18–9

The 1989 Everest World Matchplay was a professional non-ranking snooker tournament that took place in 7 to 16 December 1989 in Brentwood, England with ITV showing television coverage from 9 December.

The matches had now been expanded to 17 frame matches up to the semi-final and the final, a 35 frame, four session match as in the World Championship and Jimmy White won the event, defeating John Parrott 18–9 in the final.

Stephen Hendry got the highest break of the championship with 129. He received £10,000 in prize money.

== Prize fund ==
The breakdown of prize money for this year is shown below:

- Winner: £100,000
- Runner-up: £40,000
- Semi-final: £20,000
- Quarter-final: £10,000
- Round 1: £5,000
- Highest break: £10,000
- Total: £250,000

== Main draw ==
Round 1 Best of 17 frames
(England) Tony Meo	7
(England) Dean Reynolds	9
(Wales) Doug Mountjoy	9
(England) Willie Thorne	2
(Wales) Terry Griffiths	9
(Canada) Cliff Thorburn	5
(Northern Ireland) Dennis Taylor	9
(England) Mike Hallett	6

Quarter-finals; Best of 17 frames
(England) Steve Davis	7
(England) Dean Reynolds	9
(England) Jimmy White	9
(Wales) Doug Mountjoy	5
(Scotland) Stephen Hendry	9
(Wales) Terry Griffiths	3
(England) John Parrott	9
(Northern Ireland) Dennis Taylor	6

Semi-finals; Best of 17 frames
(England) Dean Reynolds	8
(England) Jimmy White	9
(Scotland) Stephen Hendry	8
(England) John Parrott	9

Final; Best of 35 frames
(England) Jimmy White	18
(England) John Parrott	9
