= 2019 Seniors 6-Red World Championship =

Seniors 6-Red World Championship
Tournament information
- Dates: 3 March 2019
- Venue: Waterfront Hall
- City: Belfast
- Country: Northern Ireland
- Organisation: World Seniors Snooker
- Format: Six-red Seniors event
- Total prize fund: £20,000
- Winner's share: £20,000

Final
- Champion: (England) Jimmy White
- Runner-up: (Jersey) Aaron Canavan
- Score: 4–2

The 2019 Seniors 6-Red World Championship (known for sponsorship reasons as the 2019 ROKiT Seniors 6-Red World Championship) was a winner-takes-all seniors six-red snooker tournament, that took place on 3 March 2019 at the Waterfront Hall in Belfast, Northern Ireland. It was the third event on the 2018/2019 World Seniors Tour and the first edition of this tournament.

A qualifying tournament took place from 8 to 10 February in the Crucible Sports Club in Newbury. Jonathan Bagley won 4–3 in the final against Wayne Cooper.

Jimmy White won the title, defeating World Seniors Champion Aaron Canavan 4–2 in the final.

== Prize fund ==
The breakdown of prize money is shown below:

- Winner: £20,000 (Winner takes all)
- Total: £20,000

== Main draw ==
Quarter-finals; Best of 7 frames
(England) Jimmy White	4
(England) Johnathan Bagley	1
(Scotland) Stephen Hendry	4
(England) Joe Johnson	3
(Republic of Ireland) Ken Doherty	4
(Northern Ireland) Patrick Wallace	2
(Jersey) Aaron Canavan	4
(Malta) Tony Drago	1

Semi-finals; Best of 7 frames
(England) Jimmy White	4
(Scotland) Stephen Hendry	1
(Republic of Ireland) Ken Doherty	3
(Jersey) Aaron Canavan	4

Final; Best of 7 frames
(England) Jimmy White	4
(Jersey) Aaron Canavan	2

== Final ==
Final: Best of 7 frames (6 Reds). Referee: Michaela Tabb. Waterfront Hall, Belfast, Northern Ireland, 3 March 2019.
England; Jimmy White	4–2	Jersey; Aaron Canavan
32-13, 0-53, 24-41, 41-33, 31-21, 37-1
26	Highest break	46
