= 1984 Thailand Masters =

Thailand Masters
Tournament information
- Dates: 30–31 August 1984
- Venue: Ambassador Hotel
- City: Bangkok
- Country: Thailand
- Organisation: WPBSA
- Format: Non-ranking event

Final
- Champion: (England) Jimmy White
- Runner-up: (Wales) Terry Griffiths
- Score: 4–3

The 1984 Thailand Masters was a professional non-ranking snooker tournament held in August 1984 in Bangkok, Thailand.

Six players entered into a group phase with the two highest finishing players progressing into the final. Jimmy White won the tournament, defeating Terry Griffiths 4–3 in the final.

== Main draw ==
=== Group stage ===
POS	Player	MP	MW	FW	FL	FD	PTS
1	(Wales) Terry Griffiths	5	5	10	2	+8	10
2	(England) Jimmy White	5	3	6	4	+2	6
3	(England) Tony Meo	5	3	6	5	+1	6
4	(England) John Parrott	5	2	4	6	-2	4
5	(Thailand) Sakchai Sim Ngam	5	1	4	8	−4	2
6	(England) Steve Davis	5	1	3	8	−5	2

- Terry Griffiths 2–1 Steve Davis
- Terry Griffiths 2–0 Tony Meo
- Terry Griffiths 2–0 John Parrott
- Terry Griffiths 2–1 Sakchai Sim Ngam
- Terry Griffiths 2–0 Jimmy White
- Jimmy White 2–0 Tony Meo
- Jimmy White 2–0 John Parrott
- Jimmy White 2–0 Sakchai Sim Ngam
- Tony Meo 2–0 Steve Davis
- Tony Meo 2–0 John Parrott
- Tony Meo 2–0 Sakchai Sim Ngam
- John Parrott 2–0 Steve Davis
- John Parrott 2–0 Sakchai Sim Ngam
- Sakchai Sim Ngam 2–0 Steve Davis
- Steve Davis 2–0 Jimmy White

=== Final ===
- (England) Jimmy White 4–3 Terry Griffiths (Wales)
