= 1991 European Challenge =

European Challenge
Tournament information
- Dates: 17–18 July 1991
- Venue: Happy European Sports & Business Centre
- City: Waregem
- Country: Belgium
- Organisation: WPBSA
- Format: Non-ranking event
- Total prize fund: £50,000
- Winner's share: £20,000

Final
- Champion: (England) Jimmy White
- Runner-up: (England) Steve Davis
- Score: 4–1

The 1991 Canal Plus European Challenge was a professional non-ranking snooker tournament that took place between 17 and 18 July 1991 at the Happy European Sports & Business Centre in Waregem, Belgium.

Jimmy White won the tournament beating Steve Davis 4–1 in the final.

== Main draw ==
Quarter-finals; Best of 7 frames
(England) Jimmy White	4
(Canada) Cliff Thorburn	2
(Malta) Tony Drago	4
(England) John Parrott	2
(England) Steve Davis	4
(Northern Ireland) Dennis Taylor	1
(England) Gary Wilkinson	4
(England) Steve James	2

Semi-finals; Best of 7 frames
(England) Jimmy White	4
(Malta) Tony Drago	3
(England) Steve Davis	4
(England) Gary Wilkinson	3

Final; Best of 7 frames
(England) Jimmy White	4
(England) Steve Davis	1
