= 2010 World Seniors Championship =

Tournament information
- Dates: 5–7 November 2010
- Venue: Cedar Court Hotel
- City: Bradford
- Country: England
- Organisation: WPBSA
- Format: Seniors event
- Total prize fund: £50,000
- Winner's share: £20,000

Final
- Champion: (England) Jimmy White
- Runner-up: (England) Steve Davis
- Score: 4–1

The 2010 World Seniors Championship (known for sponsorship reasons as the Wyldecrest Park Homes World Seniors Championship) was a snooker tournament that took place between 5–7 November 2010 at the Cedar Court Hotel in Bradford, England.

The event had last been held in 1991, when Cliff Wilson won in the final 5–4 against Eddie Charlton, to become the inaugural champion. Jimmy White won in the 2010 final 4–1 against Steve Davis and claimed his 30th career title.

== Prize fund ==
The breakdown of prize money for this year is shown below:

Winner: £20,000
Runner-up: £10,000
Semi-finalist: £4,000
Quarter-finalist: £2,500
Pre-qualifier: £2,000

Total: £50,000

== Main draw ==
The draw for the quarter-finals was made on the afternoon of 5 November 2010 at the venue of the event. The draw for semi-finals was made on a random basis.

All matches up to and including the quarter-finals were best of 3 frames, semi-finals were best of 5 frames and the final was the best of 7 frames. All times are GMT.

=== Pre-qualifying ===
- Friday, 5 November
  - (England) Peter Ebdon 0–2 (England) Nigel Bond

=== Quarter-finals ===
- Saturday, 6 November
  - (Republic of Ireland) Ken Doherty 0–2 (England) Nigel Bond
  - (England) Steve Davis 2–0 (England) Joe Johnson
- Saturday, 6 November
  - (Northern Ireland) Dennis Taylor 0–2 (England) John Parrott
  - (England) Jimmy White 2–0 (Canada) Cliff Thorburn

=== Semi-finals ===
- Saturday, 6 November
  - (England) Steve Davis 3–1 (England) Nigel Bond
- Sunday, 7 November
  - (England) John Parrott 2–3 (England) Jimmy White

=== Final ===
- Sunday, 7 November
  - (England) Steve Davis 1–4 (England) Jimmy White

== Qualifying tournament ==
These matches took place between 29 and 30 May 2010 at the Cue Garden, Bradford, England. There was only one century break in qualifying - a 144 made by Peter Lines.

Round 1 Best of 3 frames
(England) Peter Lines	2
(England) Mike Hallett	0
(Malta) Tony Drago	2
(England) Tony Knowles	0
(Northern Ireland) Joe Swail	2
(England) David Taylor	0
(England) Nigel Bond	2
(England) Dave Harold	0

Round 2 Best of 5 frames
(England) Peter Lines	3
(Malta) Tony Drago	0
(Northern Ireland) Joe Swail	2
(England) Nigel Bond	3

Final; Best of 7 frames
(England) Peter Lines	3
(England) Nigel Bond	4
