= 1988 World Matchplay (snooker) =

World Matchplay
Tournament information
- Dates: 2–10 December 1988
- Venue: International Centre
- City: Brentwood
- Country: England
- Format: Non-ranking event
- Total prize fund: £250,000
- Winner's share: £100,000
- Highest break: John Parrott (ENG) (135)

Final
- Champion: (England) Steve Davis
- Runner-up: (England) John Parrott
- Score: 9–5

The 1988 Everest World Matchplay was a professional non-ranking snooker tournament that took place between 2 and 10 December 1988 in Brentwood, England.

Established by Barry Hearn, this was the first World Matchplay tournament and was an invitation event for the top twelve players on the provisional ranking list. It was the first snooker event to offer a six-figure prize with the winner of the event sponsored by Everest, the double glazing company, receiving £100,000.

Of the 12 players, the top eight seeds received a bye into the quarter-finals. Steve Davis won the event, defeating John Parrott 9–5 in the final.

== Prize fund ==
The breakdown of prize money for this year is shown below:

- Winner: £100,000
- Runner-up: £40,000
- Semi-final: £20,000
- Quarter-final: £10,000
- Round 1: £5,000
- Highest break: £10,000
- Total: £250,000

== Main draw ==
Round 1 Best of 17 frames
(England) Mike Hallett	9
(England) Willie Thorne	8
(Wales) Terry Griffiths	9
(South Africa) Peter Francisco	7
(Northern Ireland) Dennis Taylor	9
(England) Tony Knowles	7
(England) Joe Johnson	9
(Canada) Cliff Thorburn	4

Quarter-finals; Best of 17 frames
(England) Steve Davis	9
(England) Mike Hallett	2
(England) Jimmy White	9
(Wales) Terry Griffiths	5
(Scotland) Stephen Hendry	9
(Northern Ireland) Dennis Taylor	7
(England) John Parrott	9
(England) Joe Johnson	7

Semi-finals; Best of 17 frames
(England) Steve Davis	9
(England) Jimmy White	5
(Scotland) Stephen Hendry	6
(England) John Parrott	9

Final; Best of 17 frames
(England) Steve Davis	9
(England) John Parrott	5

== Final ==
Final: Best of 19 frames. Referee: Len Ganley; Brentwood Centre, Brentwood, England, 10 December 1988.
Steve Davis; England	9–5	John Parrott; England
First session: 120–7 (100), 66–47, 69-6, 61-51, 102–4 (62), 59–41, 25–73; Second session: 18–91 64), 0–139 (135), 77-0 (53), 92–25 (84), 0–86, 1-85, 73-21
100	Highest break	135
1	Century breaks	1
4	50+ breaks	2
