= 1981 Northern Ireland Classic =

Northern Ireland Classic
Tournament information
- Dates: 3–7 November 1981
- Venue: Ulster Hall
- City: Belfast
- Country: Northern Ireland
- Organisation: WPBSA
- Format: Non-ranking event
- Total prize fund: £19,500
- Winner's share: £5,000
- Highest break: (Northern Ireland) Dennis Taylor (112)

Final
- Champion: (England) Jimmy White
- Runner-up: (England) Steve Davis
- Score: 11–9

The 1981 Northern Ireland Classic was a one-off invitational snooker tournament, held from 3 to 7 November 1981 at the Ulster Hall, Belfast, Northern Ireland. Jimmy White defeated Steve Davis by eleven frames to nine (11–9) in the final. Dennis Taylor made the highest break with 112.

Five of the top eight players in the rankings participated: Cliff Thorburn (1), Steve Davis (2), Terry Griffiths (3), Dennis Taylor (5) and Doug Mountjoy (6). Also participating were Kirk Stevens (10), Alex Higgins (11), and Jimmy White (21).

== Prize fund ==
The prize fund is shown below:

- Winner: £5,000
- Final: £3,500
- Semi-final: £2,500
- Quarter-final: £1,500

== Main draw ==
Quarter-finals; Best of 9 frames
(Canada) Cliff Thorburn | 2
(England) Jimmy White | 5
(Wales) Doug Mountjoy | 5
(Northern Ireland) Dennis Taylor | 4
(Wales) Terry Griffiths | 5
(Canada) Kirk Stevens | 0
(Northern Ireland) Alex Higgins | 2
(England) Steve Davis | 5

Semi-finals; Best of 17 frames
(England) Jimmy White | 9
(Wales) Doug Mountjoy | 8
(Wales) Terry Griffiths | 6
(England) Steve Davis | 9

Final; Best of 21 frames
(England) Jimmy White | 11
(England) Steve Davis | 9

== Final ==
Final: Best of 17 frames Ulster Hall, Belfast, Northern Ireland, 7 November 1981.
| Jimmy White; England | 11–9 | Steve Davis; England |
73–33, 66–18, 41–76, 41–62, 14–77, 76(51)–8, 107(67)–35, 0–94(56), 71(50)–64 (54), 8–83, 76–23, 75–24, 61–68, 0–86(72), 0–93(52), 0–123(107), 68–66, 69–24, 85–4, 86(63)–1
| 67 | Highest break | 107 |
| 0 | Century breaks | 1 |
| 4 | 50+ breaks | 5 |
