= 1988 World Cup (snooker) =

Fersina Windows World Cup
Tournament information
- Dates: 16–19 March 1988
- Venue: Bournemouth International Centre
- City: Bournemouth
- Country: England
- Format: Non-ranking event
- Total prize fund: £125,000
- Winner's share: £40,000
- Highest break: Stephen Hendry (SCO) (106)

Final
- Champion: England
- Runner-up: Australia
- Score: 9–7

The 1988 Snooker World Cup was a team snooker tournament that took place between 16 and 19 March 1988 at the Bournemouth International Centre in Bournemouth, England. Fersina Windows were the sponsors for the next two years.

Ireland returned to competing as Northern Ireland and Republic of Ireland this year and both went out in the first round to Rest of the World and England respectively. England went on to win their third title with the top 3 world ranked players Steve Davis, Jimmy White and Neal Foulds beating unfancied Australia with Eddie Charlton, John Campbell and Warren King 9 frames to 7.

== Prize fund ==
The breakdown of prize money for this year is shown below:

- Winner: £40,000
- Runner-up: £25,000
- Semi-final: £12,500
- Quarter-final: £7,500
- Highest break: £5,000
- Total: £125,000

== Main draw ==
=== Teams ===
Country	Player 1 (Captain)	Player 2	Player 3
Northern Ireland	Dennis Taylor	Alex Higgins	Tommy Murphy
England	Steve Davis	Jimmy White	Neal Foulds
Canada	Cliff Thorburn	Kirk Stevens	Bill Werbeniuk
Wales	Terry Griffiths	Doug Mountjoy	Cliff Wilson
Ireland	Eugene Hughes	Paddy Browne	Joe O'Boye
Australia	John Campbell	Eddie Charlton	Warren King
Rest of the World	(South Africa) Silvino Francisco	(New Zealand) Dene O'Kane	(Malta) Tony Drago
Scotland	Stephen Hendry	Murdo MacLeod	John Rea

Quarter-finals; Best of 9 Frames
Northern Ireland	3
Rest of the World	5
England	5
Republic of Ireland	1
Canada	0
Australia	5
Wales	4
Scotland	5

Semi-finals; Best of 9 Frames
Rest of the World	3
England	5
Australia	5
Scotland	1

Final; Best of 17 Frames
England	9
Australia	7

== Final ==
Final: Best of 17 frames. Referees: Bournemouth International Centre, Bournemouth, England. 19 March 1988.
England; Steve Davis, Jimmy White, Neal Foulds	9–7	Australia; John Campbell, Eddie Charlton, Warren King
	Highest break	
	Century breaks	
	50+ breaks	
Davis v Campbell: 1–1 (67-30, 12-66); Foulds v King: 1–1 (82-12, 29-69); White v Charlton: 0–2 (56-73, 50-75); White v Charlton: 1–1 (63-56, 26-82); White v King: 1–1 (40-57, 51-32); Foulds v Campbell: 1–1 (41-66, 68-26); Davis v Charlton: 2–0 (65-42, 84-0); Davis v King: 2–0 (106-25, 92-30)
