= 1981 Scottish Masters =

Tournament information
- Dates: 22–25 September 1981
- Venue: Kelvin Hall
- City: Glasgow
- Country: Scotland
- Organisation: WPBSA
- Format: Non-Ranking event
- Total prize fund: £20,000
- Winner's share: £8,000
- Highest break: Cliff Thorburn (CAN) (111)

Final
- Champion: Jimmy White (ENG)
- Runner-up: Cliff Thorburn (CAN)
- Score: 9–4

The 1981 Langs Supreme Scottish Masters was the inaugural edition of the professional invitational snooker tournament, which took place from 22 to 25 September 1981. The tournament was played at the Kelvin Hall in Glasgow, Scotland, and featured nine professional players.

== Summary ==
One preliminary match was played between Vic Harris, the winner of the 1981 English Amateur Championship who had recently turned professional, and Ian Black, the winner of the 1981 Scottish Professional Championship.

Jimmy White beat Ray Reardon 5–4 in the first quarter-final while Steve Davis beat Doug Mountjoy 5–0, including a break of 108. On the second day Vic Harris won his preliminary match 4–0 and then lost 3–5 to Alex Higgins. Cliff Thorburn beat Kirk Stevens 5–1 in the other quarter-final, including a break of 111 by Thorburn.

In the semi-finals Jimmy White beat Steve Davis 6–5 while Cliff Thorburn beat Alex Higgins 6–2.

Jimmy White won the first title of his professional career, beating Cliff Thorburn 9–4 in the final. Thorburn led 3–0 and 4–1 but then White won eight frames in succession to win the title and the £8,000 first prize.

== Tournament draw ==
Quarter-finals; Best of 9 frames
Cliff Thorburn (CAN)	5
Kirk Stevens (CAN)	1
Alex Higgins (NIR)	5
Vic Harris (ENG)	3
Jimmy White (ENG)	5
Ray Reardon (WAL)	4
Doug Mountjoy (WAL)	0
Steve Davis (ENG)	5

Semi-finals; Best of 11 frames
(Canada) Cliff Thorburn	6
(Northern Ireland) Alex Higgins	2
(England) Jimmy White	6
(England) Steve Davis	5

Final; Best of 17 Frames
(Canada) Cliff Thorburn	4
(England) Jimmy White	9

One preliminary match was played, with the winner advancing to face Alex Higgins in the quarter-finals; this match was played under a best-of-seven frames format.

- Vic Harris (ENG) 4–0 Ian Black (SCO)

=== Final ===
Final: Best of 17 frames. Referee: unknown. Kelvin Hall, Glasgow, Scotland, 25 September 1981.
Jimmy White; England	9–4	Cliff Thorburn; Canada
44–70, 17–59, 39–63, 73–42, 0–88 (82), 83–26, 62–43, 66–40 (64), 58–24, 95–38, 54–39, 74–53, 75–60 (Thorburn 60)
64	Highest break	82
0	Century breaks	0
1	50+ breaks	2

== Century breaks ==
- 111 – Cliff Thorburn
- 108 – Steve Davis
