= World Matchplay (snooker) =

Tournament information
- Venue: The Dome
- Location: Doncaster
- Country: England
- Established: 1988
- Organisation(s): Matchroom Sport
- Format: Non-ranking event
- Final year: 1992
- Final champion: (Thailand) James Wattana

The World Matchplay was a professional non-ranking snooker tournament established in 1988 and last held in 1992.

== History ==
In 1988 Barry Hearn created an invitational tournament, called the World Matchplay, for the provisional top 12 players, and it ran for five years. The event was held at the Brentwood Centre, Brentwood between 1988 and 1990, before moving to The Dome, Doncaster, for the last two years. The 1988 event was the first snooker tournament to offer a top prize of £100,000.

It was sponsored by Everest in 1988 and 1989, and Coalite from 1990 to 1992. It was televised between 1988 and 1992 by ITV as a replacement for the World Doubles Championship.

== Winners ==
Year	Winner	Runner-up	Final score	Season
1988	(England) Steve Davis	(England) John Parrott	9–5	1988/89
1989	(England) Jimmy White	(England) John Parrott	18–9	1989/90
1990	(England) Jimmy White	(Scotland) Stephen Hendry	18–9	1990/91
1991	(England) Gary Wilkinson	(England) Steve Davis	18–11	1991/92
1992	(Thailand) James Wattana	(England) Steve Davis	9–4	1992/93
