= 1994 UK Championship =

1994 Royal Liver Assurance UK Championship
Tournament information
- Dates: 11–27 November 1994
- Venue: Preston Guild Hall
- City: Preston
- Country: England
- Organisation: WPBSA
- Format: Ranking event
- Total prize fund: £328,100
- Winner's share: £70,000
- Highest break: Ronnie O'Sullivan (ENG) (139)

Final
- Champion: Stephen Hendry (SCO)
- Runner-up: Ken Doherty (IRL)
- Score: 10–5

The 1994 UK Championship (officially the 1994 Royal Liver Assurance UK Championship) was a professional ranking snooker tournament that took place at the Guild Hall in Preston, England. The event started on 11 November 1994, and the televised stages were shown on the BBC between 19 and 27 November 1994.

Stephen Hendry won the tournament with record 12 century breaks, beating Ken Doherty 10–5 in the final. During the match Hendry scored seven century breaks; which remains a joint record for a professional match and a standalone record for a best-of-19 match. Hendry also made six centuries in eight frames. Ronnie O'Sullivan was the defending champion, but he lost 7–9 to Doherty in the quarter-finals.

== Ranking points ==
| Champion | Runner-up | Semifinalist | Quarterfinalist | Third round | Second round | First round (unseeded) | First round (seeded) |
|---|---|---|---|---|---|---|---|
| 4800 | 3600 | 2700 | 2025 | 1520 | 1140 | 855 | 570 |

== Prize fund ==
The breakdown of prize money for this year is shown below:

| Champion | Runner-up | Semifinalist | Quarterfinalist | Third round | Second round | First round | Qualifying round |
|---|---|---|---|---|---|---|---|
| £70,000 | £37,000 | £18,500 | £10,325 | £5,250 | £3,000 | £2,200 | £775 |

| Highest Break (TV) | Highest Break (Non-TV) |
|---|---|
| £3,000 | £1,200 |

== Main draw ==
=== Top half ===
Round 1 (Last 64); Best of 17 frames
1 | (England) Ronnie O'Sullivan | 9
84 | (England) Mark Flowerdew | 7
17 | (England) Steve James | 1
(Wales) Mark Fenton | 9
32 | (Canada) Alain Robidoux | 9
171 | (Republic of Ireland) Michael Judge | 3
14 | (Wales) Terry Griffiths | 9
37 | (England) Joe Johnson | 7
13 | (England) David Roe | 7
42 | (Republic of Ireland) Fergal O'Brien | 9
25 | (England) Neal Foulds | 5
105 | (Scotland) Jamie Burnett | 9
31 | (Wales) Mark Bennett | 9
46 | (England) Danny Fowler | 4
8 | (Republic of Ireland) Ken Doherty | 9
45 | (England) Rod Lawler | 7
6 | (England) John Parrott | 9
34 | (England) Tony Jones | 4
21 | (England) Tony Knowles | 8
214 | (England) Nick Marsh | 9
26 | (Wales) Doug Mountjoy | 1
58 | (Wales) Mark Williams | 9
16 | (Malta) Tony Drago | 9
87 | (England) John Read | 7
12 | (Northern Ireland) Joe Swail | 9
265 | (England) Joe Perry | 4
20 | (New Zealand) Dene O'Kane | 9
119 | (Scotland) Euan Henderson | 6
27 | (England) Mick Price | 7
(England) Richard McDonald | 9
4 | (Thailand) James Wattana | 9
121 | (England) Lee Richardson | 3

Round 2 (Last 32); Best of 17 frames
1 | (England) Ronnie O'Sullivan | 9
(Wales) Mark Fenton | 4
32 | (Canada) Alain Robidoux | 8
14 | (Wales) Terry Griffiths | 9
42 | (Republic of Ireland) Fergal O'Brien | 9
105 | (Scotland) Jamie Burnett | 5
31 | (Wales) Mark Bennett | 3
8 | (Republic of Ireland) Ken Doherty | 9
6 | (England) John Parrott | 9
214 | (England) Nick Marsh | 4
58 | (Wales) Mark Williams | 9
16 | (Malta) Tony Drago | 8
12 | (Northern Ireland) Joe Swail | 9
20 | (New Zealand) Dene O'Kane | 5
(England) Richard McDonald | 3
4 | (Thailand) James Wattana | 9

Round 3 (Last 16); Best of 17 frames
1 | (England) Ronnie O'Sullivan | 9
14 | (Wales) Terry Griffiths | 5
42 | (Republic of Ireland) Fergal O'Brien | 4
8 | (Republic of Ireland) Ken Doherty | 9
6 | (England) John Parrott | 9
58 | (Wales) Mark Williams | 8
12 | (Northern Ireland) Joe Swail | 4
4 | (Thailand) James Wattana | 9

Quarter-finals; Best of 17 frames
1 | (England) Ronnie O'Sullivan | 7
8 | (Republic of Ireland) Ken Doherty | 9
6 | (England) John Parrott | 5
4 | (Thailand) James Wattana | 9

Semi-final; Best of 17 frames
8 | (Republic of Ireland) Ken Doherty | 9
4 | (Thailand) James Wattana | 6

=== Bottom half ===
Round 1 (Last 64); Best of 17 frames
3 | (England) Steve Davis | 9
55 | (Wales) Paul Davies | 3
19 | (England) Dave Harold | 9
93 | (England) Jamie Woodman | 3
18 | (England) Martin Clark | 3
39 | (Scotland) Drew Henry | 9
11 | (England) Nigel Bond | 4
48 | (Northern Ireland) Alex Higgins | 9
10 | (England) Peter Ebdon | 9
78 | (England) Karl Payne | 3
24 | (Northern Ireland) Dennis Taylor | 9
52 | (Wales) Wayne Jones | 7
28 | (England) Jason Ferguson | 9
86 | (Scotland) Chris Small | 7
5 | (England) Jimmy White | w/o
56 | (Canada) Jim Wych | w/d
7 | (Scotland) Alan McManus | 7
89 | (England) Mark King | 9
23 | (England) Mike Hallett | 6
35 | (England) Anthony Hamilton | 9
30 | (England) Brian Morgan | 9
36 | (Scotland) Billy Snaddon | 4
9 | (Wales) Darren Morgan | 9
43 | (England) Les Dodd | 4
15 | (England) Willie Thorne | 9
147 | (Scotland) Craig MacGillivray | 4
22 | (England) Gary Wilkinson | 9
38 | (England) Nick Terry | 8
29 | (England) Dean Reynolds | 9
33 | (England) Andy Hicks | 7
2 | (Scotland) Stephen Hendry | 9
142 | (England) Adrian Rosa | 5

Round 2 (Last 32); Best of 17 frames
3 | (England) Steve Davis | 6
19 | (England) Dave Harold | 9
39 | (Scotland) Drew Henry | 7
48 | (Northern Ireland) Alex Higgins | 9
10 | (England) Peter Ebdon | 9
24 | (Northern Ireland) Dennis Taylor | 2
28 | (England) Jason Ferguson | 9
5 | (England) Jimmy White | 3
89 | (England) Mark King | 9
35 | (England) Anthony Hamilton | 8
30 | (England) Brian Morgan | 3
9 | (Wales) Darren Morgan | 9
15 | (England) Willie Thorne | 9
22 | (England) Gary Wilkinson | 4
29 | (England) Dean Reynolds | 8
2 | (Scotland) Stephen Hendry | 9

Round 3 (Last 16); Best of 17 frames
19 | (England) Dave Harold | 9
48 | (Northern Ireland) Alex Higgins | 4
10 | (England) Peter Ebdon | 9
28 | (England) Jason Ferguson | 1
89 | (England) Mark King | 5
9 | (Wales) Darren Morgan | 9
15 | (England) Willie Thorne | 2
2 | (Scotland) Stephen Hendry | 9

Quarter-finals; Best of 17 frames
19 | (England) Dave Harold | 5
10 | (England) Peter Ebdon | 9
9 | (Wales) Darren Morgan | 3
2 | (Scotland) Stephen Hendry | 9

Semi-final; Best of 17 frames
10 | (England) Peter Ebdon | 8
2 | (Scotland) Stephen Hendry | 9

=== Final ===
Final: Best of 19 frames. Referee: John Street; The Guild Hall, Preston, England, 27 November 1994.
| Stephen Hendry (2); Scotland | 10–5 | Ken Doherty (8); Ireland |
First session: 46–72 (72), 112–0 (112), 114–9 (114), 130–0 (130), 10–71 (71), 109–23 (109), 61–66 (Hendry 52), 106–20 (106); Second session: 117–9 (110), 64–65, 20–61 (56), 67–50, 113–17 (106), 74–25 (57), 72–45
| 130 | Highest break | 72 |
| 7 | Century breaks | 0 |
| 9 | 50+ breaks | 3 |

== Century breaks ==
- 139, 106 – Ronnie O'Sullivan
- 138, 118, 113, 112, 104, 103 – Ken Doherty
- 135 – Dave Harold
- 135 – Mick Price
- 130, 128, 120, 114, 113, 112, 110, 109, 106, 106, 103, 101 – Stephen Hendry
- 128, 121 – Chris Small
- 125, 115, 111, 101 – Peter Ebdon
- 124, 100 – Terry Murphy
- 119 – Alex Higgins
- 116, 114, 113, 112, 107 – James Wattana
- 115 – Bradley Jones
- 114 – Billy Snaddon
- 113 – Jamie Burnett
- 112 – Martin Clark
- 112 – Lee Richardson
- 107, 103, 100 – Darren Morgan
- 107, 100 – Matthew Stevens
- 107 – Joe Swail
- 106 – John Read
- 105, 104 – Willie Thorne
- 102 – Yasin Merchant
- 102 – Fergal O'Brien
