= 1992 European Open (snooker) =

Tournament information
- Dates: 10–14 March 1992
- Venue: Tongeren Snooker Centre
- City: Tongeren
- Country: Belgium
- Organisation: WPBSA
- Format: Ranking event
- Winner's share: £25,000

Final
- Champion: Jimmy White (ENG)
- Runner-up: Mark Johnston-Allen (ENG)
- Score: 9–3

The 1992 European Open was a professional ranking snooker tournament that took place in March 1992 at the Tongeren Snooker Centre in Tongeren, Belgium.

Jimmy White won the tournament, defeating Mark Johnston-Allen 9–3 in the final.

== Main draw ==
Last 64; Best of 9 frames
(England) Jimmy White	5
(Wales) Tony Chappel	4
(Cyprus) Mehmet Husnu	5
(South Africa) Silvino Francisco	4
(England) Martin Clark	5
(England) Rex Williams	2
(England) Nick Terry	5
(England) Nigel Bond	3
(England) Steve Davis	5
(Australia) Warren King	4
(Canada) Cliff Thorburn	5
(Wales) Cliff Wilson	2
(England) Nigel Gilbert	5
(England) Mike Hallett	3
(England) Andy Hicks	5
(Canada) Bob Chaperon	0
(Wales) Terry Griffiths	5
(Canada) Brady Gollan	2
(Wales) Mark Bennett	5
(Republic of Ireland) Eugene Hughes	2
(England) Tony Jones	5
(England) Nick Dyson	4
(Northern Ireland) Jack McLaughlin	5
(Malta) Tony Drago	4
(Wales) Darren Morgan	5
(England) Tony Knowles	3
(England) John Virgo	5
(England) David Taylor	3
(England) Willie Thorne	5
(England) Rod Lawler	4
(England) Steve James	5
(England) Peter Ebdon	3
(England) Mark Johnston-Allen	5
(New Zealand) Dene O'Kane	3
(England) Dean Reynolds	5
(Isle of Man) Tony Wilson	3
(Scotland) Stephen Hendry	5
(England) Troy Shaw	0
(England) Joe Johnson	5
(Scotland) Alan McManus	1
(England) Mick Price	5
(England) Danny Fowler	1
(Wales) Doug Mountjoy	5
(England) Mick Fisher	0
(Wales) Steve Newbury	5
(England) Les Dodd	3
(England) Gary Wilkinson	5
(Wales) Colin Roscoe	2
(England) John Parrott	5
(Canada) Kirk Stevens	1
(England) Jonathan Birch	5
(Australia) Eddie Charlton	1
(Northern Ireland) Dennis Taylor	5
(England) Jim Chambers	2
(South Africa) Peter Francisco	5
(England) Paul Tanner	1
(Canada) Alain Robidoux	5
(Canada) Jim Wych	4
(Wales) Wayne Jones	5
(England) Brian Rowswell	1
(England) Neal Foulds	5
(England) Bob Marshall	0
(England) David Roe	5
(Thailand) James Wattana	3

Last 32; Best of 9 frames
(England) Jimmy White	5
(Cyprus) Mehmet Husnu	0
(England) Martin Clark	5
(England) Nick Terry	3
(England) Steve Davis	5
(Canada) Cliff Thorburn	0
(England) Nigel Gilbert	5
(England) Andy Hicks	4
(Wales) Terry Griffiths	5
(Wales) Mark Bennett	4
(England) Tony Jones	5
(Northern Ireland) Jack McLaughlin	1
(Wales) Darren Morgan	5
(England) John Virgo	2
(England) Willie Thorne	5
(England) Steve James	2
(England) Mark Johnston-Allen	5
(England) Dean Reynolds	2
(Scotland) Stephen Hendry	5
(England) Joe Johnson	2
(England) Mick Price	5
(Wales) Doug Mountjoy	4
(Wales) Steve Newbury	5
(England) Gary Wilkinson	0
(England) John Parrott	5
(England) Jonathan Birch	4
(Northern Ireland) Dennis Taylor	5
(South Africa) Peter Francisco	3
(Canada) Alain Robidoux	5
(Wales) Wayne Jones	3
(England) Neal Foulds	5
(England) David Roe	4

Last 16; Best of 9 frames
(England) Jimmy White	5
(England) Martin Clark	2
(England) Steve Davis	5
(England) Nigel Gilbert	2
(Wales) Terry Griffiths	5
(England) Tony Jones	2
(Wales) Darren Morgan	5
(England) Willie Thorne	0
(England) Mark Johnston-Allen	5
(Scotland) Stephen Hendry	2
(England) Mick Price	5
(Wales) Steve Newbury	2
(England) John Parrott	5
(Northern Ireland) Dennis Taylor	3
(Canada) Alain Robidoux	5
(England) Neal Foulds	2

Quarter-finals; Best of 9 frames
(England) Jimmy White	5
(England) Steve Davis	1
(Wales) Terry Griffiths	5
(Wales) Darren Morgan	1
(England) Mark Johnston-Allen	5
(England) Mick Price	4
(England) John Parrott	5
(Canada) Alain Robidoux	1

Semi-finals; Best of 11 frames
(England) Jimmy White	6
(Wales) Terry Griffiths	0
(England) Mark Johnston-Allen	6
(England) John Parrott	2

Final; Best of 17 frames
(England) Jimmy White	9
(England) Mark Johnston-Allen	3
