= 1996 Grand Prix (snooker) =

Grand Prix
Tournament information
- Dates: 16–27 October 1996
- Venue: Bournemouth International Centre
- City: Bournemouth
- Country: England
- Organisation: WPBSA
- Format: Ranking event
- Total prize fund: £330,000
- Winner's share: £60,000
- Highest break: Mark Williams (WAL) (138)

Final
- Champion: Mark Williams (WAL)
- Runner-up: Euan Henderson (SCO)
- Score: 9–5

The 1996 Grand Prix was a professional ranking snooker tournament that took place between 16 and 27 October 1996 at the Bournemouth International Centre in Bournemouth, England.

== Prize fund ==
The breakdown of prize money for this year is shown below:

Winner: £60,000
Runner up: £32,000
Semi-finalists: £16,000
Quarter-finalists: £9,050
Last 16: £4,550
Last 32: £2,600
Last 64: £1,900

Stage one High Break: £3,600
Stage two High Break: £5,000

Total: £330,000

== Main draw ==
Last 64; Best of 9 frames
1	(Scotland) Stephen Hendry	1
67	(Wales) Matthew Stevens	5
29	(England) Jason Ferguson	0
39	(England) Mark King	5
24	(England) Steve James	5
48	(Wales) Wayne Jones	4
16	(Wales) Mark Williams	5
(England) Mark Gray	3
14	(Canada) Alain Robidoux	5
53	(Wales) Paul Davies	1
19	(England) Gary Wilkinson	5
(Thailand) Noppadon Noppachorn	1
28	(England) Dave Finbow	3
(England) Nick Pearce	5
8	(England) Ronnie O'Sullivan	5
(England) Gary Ponting	1
5	(England) Nigel Bond	1
(England) Oliver King	5
27	(New Zealand) Dene O'Kane	4
35	(Scotland) Billy Snaddon	5
12	(Thailand) James Wattana	5
58	(Scotland) Graeme Dott	4
18	(England) Andy Hicks	3
(Scotland) Paul McPhillips	5
9	(Wales) Darren Morgan	5
57	(England) Karl Broughton	1
32	(England) Mick Price	5
56	(Northern Ireland) Jason Prince	4
21	(England) Neal Foulds	5
55	(England) Mark Davis	2
4	(England) John Parrott	5
47	(England) Joe Johnson	4
3	(England) Peter Ebdon	3
43	(Wales) Mark Bennett	5
30	(Scotland) Chris Small	5
(England) Paul Hunter	4
25	(England) Willie Thorne	2
(Northern Ireland) Gerard Greene	5
10	(England) Steve Davis	5
(England) John Giles	2
15	(Malta) Tony Drago	5
(England) Andrew Cairns	1
20	(England) Rod Lawler	2
(England) Wayne Rendle	5
33	(England) Martin Clark	5
(Finland) Robin Hull	0
7	(Republic of Ireland) Ken Doherty	5
(England) Wayne Brown	1
6	(Scotland) Alan McManus	2
64	(England) Jonathan Birch	5
17	(Northern Ireland) Joe Swail	0
62	(Scotland) Euan Henderson	5
22	(England) Anthony Hamilton	5
(England) Nick Walker	4
11	(England) Dave Harold	4
36	(Republic of Ireland) Fergal O'Brien	5
13	(England) Jimmy White	1
63	(England) Tony Jones	5
26	(Northern Ireland) Dennis Taylor	3
(England) Sean Storey	5
31	(England) Stephen Lee	5
(England) Steve Judd	3
2	(Scotland) John Higgins	5
54	(Scotland) Jamie Burnett	3

Last 32; Best of 9 frames
67	(Wales) Matthew Stevens	0
39	(England) Mark King	5
24	(England) Steve James	2
16	(Wales) Mark Williams	5
14	(Canada) Alain Robidoux	5
19	(England) Gary Wilkinson	3
(England) Nick Pearce	5
8	(England) Ronnie O'Sullivan	1
(England) Oliver King	3
35	(Scotland) Billy Snaddon	5
12	(Thailand) James Wattana	5
(Scotland) Paul McPhillips	2
9	(Wales) Darren Morgan	5
32	(England) Mick Price	3
21	(England) Neal Foulds	1
4	(England) John Parrott	5
43	(Wales) Mark Bennett	5
30	(Scotland) Chris Small	0
(Northern Ireland) Gerard Greene	0
10	(England) Steve Davis	5
15	(Malta) Tony Drago	5
(England) Wayne Rendle	1
33	(England) Martin Clark	2
7	(Republic of Ireland) Ken Doherty	5
64	(England) Jonathan Birch	3
62	(Scotland) Euan Henderson	5
22	(England) Anthony Hamilton	5
36	(Republic of Ireland) Fergal O'Brien	4
63	(England) Tony Jones	5
(England) Sean Storey	1
31	(England) Stephen Lee	3
2	(Scotland) John Higgins	5

Last 16; Best of 9 frames
39	(England) Mark King	3
16	(Wales) Mark Williams	5
14	(Canada) Alain Robidoux	5
(England) Nick Pearce	0
35	(Scotland) Billy Snaddon	2
12	(Thailand) James Wattana	5
9	(Wales) Darren Morgan	0
4	(England) John Parrott	5
43	(Wales) Mark Bennett	5
10	(England) Steve Davis	3
15	(Malta) Tony Drago	5
7	(Republic of Ireland) Ken Doherty	3
62	(Scotland) Euan Henderson	5
22	(England) Anthony Hamilton	3
63	(England) Tony Jones	5
2	(Scotland) John Higgins	3

Quarter-finals; Best of 9 frames
16	(Wales) Mark Williams	5
14	(Canada) Alain Robidoux	3
12	(Thailand) James Wattana	3
4	(England) John Parrott	5
43	(Wales) Mark Bennett	5
15	(Malta) Tony Drago	1
62	(Scotland) Euan Henderson	5
63	(England) Tony Jones	4

Semi-finals; Best of 11 frames
16	(Wales) Mark Williams	6
4	(England) John Parrott	1
43	(Wales) Mark Bennett	3
62	(Scotland) Euan Henderson	6

Final; Best of 17 frames
16	(Wales) Mark Williams	9
62	(Scotland) Euan Henderson	5

== Final ==
Final: Best of 17 frames. Referee: Colin Brinded. Bournemouth International Centre, Bournemouth, England, 27 October 1996.
Mark Williams (16); Wales	9–5	Euan Henderson (62); Scotland
Afternoon: 47–76, 57–22, 34–79 (54), 66–43, 75–55 (Henderson 55), 0–64 (58), 3–66, 10–69 (60); Evening: 72–55, 20–98 (55), 56–63 (Williams 56, Henderson 53), 71–64 (Williams 51), 8–100 (87), 0–117 (73)
56	Highest break	87
0	Century breaks	0
2	50+ breaks	8

== Century breaks ==
=== Qualifying stage centuries ===
- 145 – Matthew Stevens
- 135, 132, 104 – Alfie Burden
- 128 – David Gray
- 121 – Danny Lathouwers
- 117 – Richy McDonald
- 116 – Tai Pichit
- 114, 110 – Simon Bedford
- 110, 101 – Ian McCulloch
- 109 – Dylan Leary
- 109 – Suriya Suwannasingh
- 105 – Robert Milkins
- 100 – Johl Younger

=== Televised stage centuries ===
- 138, 100 – Mark Williams
- 133, 100, 106, 102 – Euan Henderson
- 133 – Tony Drago
- 131, 130, 129 – James Wattana
- 131, 113 – Ronnie O'Sullivan
- 130 – Chris Small
- 128, 103 – John Parrott
- 125 – Andy Hicks
- 112 – John Higgins
- 107 – Fergal O'Brien
- 106 – Nick Pearce
- 105 – Jamie Burnett
- 101 – Gary Wilkinson
