= 1994 Grand Prix (snooker) =

Skoda Grand Prix
Tournament information
- Dates: 10–23 October 1994
- Venue: Assembly Rooms
- City: Derby
- Country: England
- Organisation: WPBSA
- Format: Ranking event
- Total prize fund: £325,000
- Winner's share: £60,000
- Highest break: Dave Harold (ENG) (140)

Final
- Champion: John Higgins (SCO)
- Runner-up: Dave Harold (ENG)
- Score: 9–6

The 1994 Skoda Grand Prix was a professional ranking snooker tournament that took place at the Assembly Rooms in Derby, England. The event started on 10 October 1994 and the televised stages were shown on BBC between 16 and 23 October 1994.

John Higgins won in the final 9–6 against Dave Harold to claim his first ranking title. Higgins, ranked 51 at the time, defeated four top 16 seeded players at the event: Willie Thorne (15) in the first round; James Wattana (4) in the last 16; Ronnie O'Sullivan (10) in a 5–0 whitewash in the quarter-finals and Joe Swail (12) in the semi-finals.

== Prize fund and ranking points ==
The breakdown of prize money and ranking points of the event are shown below:

		Prize money	Ranking points
Winner		£60,000	2700
Runner-up		£32,000	2025
Semi-final		£16,000	1520
Quarter-final		£9,050	1330
Last 16		£4,550	1140
Last 32		£2,600	855
Last 64	Unseeded	£1,900	640
Last 64	Seeded	£1,900	427

Highest break	Prize money	Break
Non-televised	£1,200	145 (Finland) Robin Hull
Televised	£2,400	140 (England) Dave Harold

== Main draw ==
Last 64; Best of 9 frames
1	(England) Peter Ebdon	5
(Republic of Ireland) Stephen O'Connor	3
17	(England) Steve James	2
(Scotland) Jamie Burnett	5
27	(England) Mick Price	4
(England) Ian Brumby	5
11	(England) Nigel Bond	1
(England) Jimmy Michie	5
12	(Northern Ireland) Joe Swail	5
(Wales) Dominic Dale	2
28	(England) Jason Ferguson	5
(Pakistan) Shokat Ali	3
20	(New Zealand) Dene O'Kane	2
(England) Wayne Brown	5
6	(England) John Parrott	4
53	(Wales) Tony Chappel	5
8	(Republic of Ireland) Ken Doherty	5
(England) Ken Owers	3
22	(England) Gary Wilkinson	4
(England) Mark King	5
32	(Canada) Alain Robidoux	5
(England) Darren Clarke	2
10	(England) Ronnie O'Sullivan	5
(England) Jason Weston	3
15	(England) Willie Thorne	4
51	(Scotland) John Higgins	5
18	(England) Martin Clark	5
40	(England) Stephen Lee	4
21	(England) Tony Knowles	5
47	(Northern Ireland) Jason Prince	3
4	(Thailand) James Wattana	5
(England) John Read	1
3	(England) Steve Davis	5
(Northern Ireland) Terry Murphy	3
31	(Wales) Mark Bennett	0
37	(England) Joe Johnson	5
25	(England) Neal Foulds	1
35	(England) Anthony Hamilton	5
13	(England) David Roe	1
62	(Wales) Steve Newbury	5
14	(Wales) Terry Griffiths	5
(England) Steve Judd	0
23	(England) Mike Hallett	4
33	(England) Andy Hicks	5
24	(Northern Ireland) Dennis Taylor	0
(Scotland) Euan Henderson	5
5	(England) Jimmy White	5
59	(Scotland) Paul McPhillips	2
7	(Scotland) Alan McManus	5
49	(England) Nigel Gilbert	1
26	(Wales) Doug Mountjoy	5
(England) Karl Payne	4
19	(England) Dave Harold	5
55	(Wales) Paul Davies	3
9	(Wales) Darren Morgan	5
54	(Canada) Cliff Thorburn	1
16	(Malta) Tony Drago	5
(England) Mark Flowerdew	1
30	(England) Brian Morgan	3
45	(England) Rod Lawler	5
29	(England) Dean Reynolds	5
58	(Wales) Mark Williams	1
2	(Scotland) Stephen Hendry	5
(Scotland) Chris Small	4

Last 32; Best of 9 frames
1	(England) Peter Ebdon	5
(Scotland) Jamie Burnett	3
(England) Ian Brumby	4
(England) Jimmy Michie	5
12	(Northern Ireland) Joe Swail	5
28	(England) Jason Ferguson	0
(England) Wayne Brown	5
53	(Wales) Tony Chappel	4
8	(Republic of Ireland) Ken Doherty	5
(England) Mark King	0
32	(Canada) Alain Robidoux	4
10	(England) Ronnie O'Sullivan	5
51	(Scotland) John Higgins	5
18	(England) Martin Clark	4
21	(England) Tony Knowles	3
4	(Thailand) James Wattana	5
3	(England) Steve Davis	5
37	(England) Joe Johnson	0
35	(England) Anthony Hamilton	5
62	(Wales) Steve Newbury	2
14	(Wales) Terry Griffiths	1
33	(England) Andy Hicks	5
(Scotland) Euan Henderson	5
5	(England) Jimmy White	2
7	(Scotland) Alan McManus	5
26	(Wales) Doug Mountjoy	2
19	(England) Dave Harold	5
9	(Wales) Darren Morgan	3
16	(Malta) Tony Drago	2
45	(England) Rod Lawler	5
29	(England) Dean Reynolds	3
2	(Scotland) Stephen Hendry	5

Last 16; Best of 9 frames
1	(England) Peter Ebdon	3
(England) Jimmy Michie	5
12	(Northern Ireland) Joe Swail	5
(England) Wayne Brown	3
8	(Republic of Ireland) Ken Doherty	3
10	(England) Ronnie O'Sullivan	5
51	(Scotland) John Higgins	5
4	(Thailand) James Wattana	3
3	(England) Steve Davis	5
35	(England) Anthony Hamilton	1
33	(England) Andy Hicks	5
(Scotland) Euan Henderson	3
7	(Scotland) Alan McManus	2
19	(England) Dave Harold	5
45	(England) Rod Lawler	0
2	(Scotland) Stephen Hendry	5

Quarter-finals; Best of 9 frames
(England) Jimmy Michie	4
12	(Northern Ireland) Joe Swail	5
10	(England) Ronnie O'Sullivan	0
51	(Scotland) John Higgins	5
3	(England) Steve Davis	3
33	(England) Andy Hicks	5
19	(England) Dave Harold	5
2	(Scotland) Stephen Hendry	2

Semi-finals; Best of 17 frames
12	(Northern Ireland) Joe Swail	5
51	(Scotland) John Higgins	9
33	(England) Andy Hicks	8
19	(England) Dave Harold	9

Final; Best of 17 frames
51	(Scotland) John Higgins	9
19	(England) Dave Harold	6

== Final ==
Final: Best of 17 frames. Referee: John Williams. Assembly Rooms, Derby, England, 23 October 1994.
John Higgins (51); Scotland	9–6	Dave Harold (19); England
Afternoon: 98–10, 41–64, 82–48 (67), 72–9, 1–75 (70), 67–9, 74–0 (62), 93–36 (92); Evening: 91–23, 6–123 (99), 22–82 (72), 118–0 (118), 46–58, 28–77, 82–1 (82)
118	Highest break	99
1	Century breaks	0
5	50+ breaks	3
