= 1996 British Open =

Tournament information
- Dates: 1–8 April 1996
- Venue: Plymouth Pavilions
- City: Plymouth
- Country: England
- Organisation: WPBSA
- Format: Ranking event
- Total prize fund: £321,400
- Winner's share: £60,000
- Highest break: John Higgins (SCO); Andy Hicks (ENG) (139)

Final
- Champion: Nigel Bond (ENG)
- Runner-up: John Higgins (SCO)
- Score: 9–8

The 1996 British Open was a professional ranking snooker tournament which was held from 1–8 April 1996 at the Plymouth Pavilions, Plymouth, England.

Nigel Bond won the tournament, his first ranking title, by defeating the defending champion John Higgins 9–8 in the final.

== Main draw ==
Last 64; Best of 9 frames
(England) Ronnie O'Sullivan	5
(England) Oliver King	2
(England) Willie Thorne	4
(Scotland) Graeme Dott	5
(Republic of Ireland) Ken Doherty	5
(England) Barry Pinches	1
(England) Chris Scanlon	1
(England) Andy Hicks	5
(Wales) Mark Williams	5
(England) David Roe	4
(India) Yasin Merchant	4
(England) Neal Foulds	5
(Thailand) James Wattana	5
(England) Karl Broughton	2
(England) Jimmy Michie	3
(England) Tony Knowles	5
(England) John Parrott	5
(England) Mark Rowing	3
(Republic of Ireland) David McDonnell	4
(England) Dean Reynolds	5
(Wales) Mark Bennett	5
(Malta) Tony Drago	0
(England) Stuart Pettman	2
(England) Gary Wilkinson	5
(England) Jason Ferguson	5
(Wales) Steve Newbury	0
(Scotland) John Higgins	5
(Scotland) Jamie Burnett	1
(England) Brian Morgan	2
(England) Mike Hallett	5
(England) Stephen Lee	5
(Wales) Terry Griffiths	2
(England) Steve Davis	2
(England) Mark Johnston-Allen	5
(England) Karl Payne	2
(England) Anthony Hamilton	5
(Wales) Anthony Davies	2
(England) Mick Price	5
(England) Dave Harold	5
(England) Antony Bolsover	2
(England) Jimmy White	5
(Wales) Matthew Stevens	3
(Republic of Ireland) Fergal O'Brien	5
(Canada) Alain Robidoux	1
(England) Martin Clark	5
(England) Joe Johnson	4
(Netherlands) Stefan Mazrocis	1
(Wales) Darren Morgan	5
(England) Steve James	5
(England) Mark Flowerdew	1
(England) Steve Meakin	3
(Scotland) Alan McManus	5
(England) Rod Lawler	0
(Northern Ireland) Dennis Taylor	5
(England) Pat Horne	3
(England) Peter Ebdon	5
(Northern Ireland) Terry Murphy	1
(Scotland) Stephen Hendry	5
(Scotland) Billy Snaddon	2
(Northern Ireland) Joe Swail	5
(New Zealand) Dene O'Kane	5
(England) Matthew Couch	2
(Scotland) Paul McPhillips	0
(England) Nigel Bond	5

Last 32; Best of 9 frames
(England) Ronnie O'Sullivan	5
(Scotland) Graeme Dott	1
(Republic of Ireland) Ken Doherty	5
(England) Andy Hicks	4
(Wales) Mark Williams	5
(England) Neal Foulds	1
(Thailand) James Wattana	4
(England) Tony Knowles	5
(England) John Parrott	5
(England) Dean Reynolds	3
(Wales) Mark Bennett	0
(England) Gary Wilkinson	5
(England) Jason Ferguson	4
(Scotland) John Higgins	5
(England) Mike Hallett	3
(England) Stephen Lee	5
(England) Mark Johnston-Allen	5
(England) Anthony Hamilton	4
(England) Mick Price	2
(England) Dave Harold	5
(England) Jimmy White	3
(Republic of Ireland) Fergal O'Brien	5
(England) Martin Clark	4
(Wales) Darren Morgan	5
(England) Steve James	4
(Scotland) Alan McManus	5
(Northern Ireland) Dennis Taylor	4
(England) Peter Ebdon	5
(Scotland) Stephen Hendry	5
(Northern Ireland) Joe Swail	1
(New Zealand) Dene O'Kane	1
(England) Nigel Bond	5

Last 16; Best of 9 frames
(England) Ronnie O'Sullivan	5
(Republic of Ireland) Ken Doherty	3
(Wales) Mark Williams	5
(England) Tony Knowles	0
(England) John Parrott	5
(England) Gary Wilkinson	2
(Scotland) John Higgins	5
(England) Stephen Lee	3
(England) Mark Johnston-Allen	2
(England) Dave Harold	5
(Republic of Ireland) Fergal O'Brien	1
(Wales) Darren Morgan	5
(Scotland) Alan McManus	1
(England) Peter Ebdon	5
(Scotland) Stephen Hendry	4
(England) Nigel Bond	5

Quarter-finals; Best of 9 frames
(England) Ronnie O'Sullivan	5
(Wales) Mark Williams	3
(England) John Parrott	3
(Scotland) John Higgins	5
(England) Dave Harold	5
(Wales) Darren Morgan	1
(England) Peter Ebdon	3
(England) Nigel Bond	5

Semi-finals; Best of 11 frames
(England) Ronnie O'Sullivan	4
(Scotland) John Higgins	6
(England) Dave Harold	5
(England) Nigel Bond	6

Final; Best of 17 frames
(Scotland) John Higgins	8
(England) Nigel Bond	9

== Final ==
Final: Best of 17 frames. Referee: Len Ganley; Plymouth Pavilions, Plymouth, England. 8 April 1996.
Nigel Bond; England	9–8	John Higgins; Scotland
Afternoon: 71–56, 96–4 (61), 65–64, 53–64 (56), 79–47 (79), 18–72, 17–102 (66), 0–91 (91); Evening: 89–0 (89), 30–60, 99–30 (50), 55–56, 72–0, 0–97 (97), 122–6 (122), 8–128 (75), 71–69
122	Highest break	97
1	Century breaks	0
5	50+ breaks	5
