= 1998 Scottish Open (snooker) =

1998 Regal Scottish Open
Tournament information
- Dates: 12–22 February 1998
- Venue: AECC
- City: Aberdeen
- Country: Scotland
- Organisation: WPBSA
- Format: Ranking event
- Total prize fund: £350,000
- Winner's share: £60,000
- Highest break: Tony Drago (MLT) (140)

Final
- Champion: Ronnie O'Sullivan (ENG)
- Runner-up: John Higgins (SCO)
- Score: 9–5

The 1998 Scottish Open (officially the 1998 Regal Scottish Open) was a professional ranking snooker tournament, that was held in February 1998 at the AECC, Aberdeen, Scotland.

Ronnie O'Sullivan won the tournament by defeating John Higgins nine frames to five in the final. The defending champion, Stephen Hendry, was defeated in the last 16 by Marcus Campbell.

== Main draw ==
Last 64; Best of 9 frames
(Scotland) Stephen Hendry	5
(England) Leigh Griffin	4
(England) Gary Wilkinson	5
(England) Matthew Couch	4
(Scotland) Alan McManus	3
(Scotland) Marcus Campbell	5
(England) Andy Hicks	5
(England) Dean Reynolds	4
(England) Anthony Hamilton	4
(Scotland) Drew Henry	5
(England) Jimmy White	5
(Scotland) Graeme Dott	4
(England) Ronnie O'Sullivan	5
(England) Karl Payne	4
(England) Brian Morgan	5
(England) David Gray	1
(England) John Parrott	5
(Scotland) Jamie Burnett	1
(England) Mick Price	4
(England) Paul Hunter	5
(England) Stephen Lee	5
(Republic of Ireland) Michael Judge	1
(England) Neal Foulds	5
(England) Dave Finbow	2
(Malta) Tony Drago	4
(Wales) Mark Bennett	5
(England) Dave Harold	3
(Wales) Dominic Dale	5
(Wales) Mark Williams	3
(England) Peter Lines	5
(Northern Ireland) Joe Swail	4
(England) Chris Scanlon	5
(Scotland) John Higgins	5
(Wales) Tony Chappel	1
(England) Mark King	3
(England) Stuart Pettman	5
(Thailand) James Wattana	5
(Pakistan) Shokat Ali	1
(England) Martin Clark	5
(England) Jason Ferguson	2
(Canada) Alain Robidoux	3
(England) David Roe	5
(Scotland) Chris Small	3
(Scotland) Euan Henderson	5
(England) Nigel Bond	5
(New Zealand) Dene O'Kane	4
(Northern Ireland) Terry Murphy	5
(England) Nick Pearce	4
(England) Peter Ebdon	5
(England) Steve Judd	0
(England) Rod Lawler	4
(England) Paul Wykes	5
(Wales) Darren Morgan	2
(England) Joe Perry	5
(Republic of Ireland) Fergal O'Brien	5
(England) Peter McCullagh	2
(England) Steve Davis	5
(England) John Read	0
(England) Steve James	2
(England) Troy Shaw	5
(Republic of Ireland) Ken Doherty	5
(England) Sean Storey	1
(Scotland) Billy Snaddon	1
(Northern Ireland) Gerard Greene	5

Last 32; Best of 9 frames
(Scotland) Stephen Hendry	5
(England) Gary Wilkinson	3
(Scotland) Marcus Campbell	5
(England) Andy Hicks	3
(Scotland) Drew Henry	3
(England) Jimmy White	5
(England) Ronnie O'Sullivan	5
(England) Brian Morgan	4
(England) John Parrott	0
(England) Paul Hunter	5
(England) Stephen Lee	5
(England) Neal Foulds	2
(Wales) Mark Bennett	5
(Wales) Dominic Dale	2
(England) Peter Lines	0
(England) Chris Scanlon	5
(Scotland) John Higgins	5
(England) Stuart Pettman	0
(Thailand) James Wattana	0
(England) Martin Clark	5
(England) David Roe	4
(Scotland) Euan Henderson	5
(England) Nigel Bond	5
(Northern Ireland) Terry Murphy	1
(England) Peter Ebdon	5
(England) Paul Wykes	0
(England) Joe Perry	3
(Republic of Ireland) Fergal O'Brien	5
(England) Steve Davis	5
(England) Troy Shaw	1
(Republic of Ireland) Ken Doherty	5
(Northern Ireland) Gerard Greene	1

Last 16; Best of 9 frames
(Scotland) Stephen Hendry	4
(Scotland) Marcus Campbell	5
(England) Jimmy White	3
(England) Ronnie O'Sullivan	5
(England) Paul Hunter	4
(England) Stephen Lee	5
(Wales) Mark Bennett	0
(England) Chris Scanlon	5
(Scotland) John Higgins	5
(England) Martin Clark	1
(Scotland) Euan Henderson	5
(England) Nigel Bond	2
(England) Peter Ebdon	3
(Republic of Ireland) Fergal O'Brien	5
(England) Steve Davis	2
(Republic of Ireland) Ken Doherty	5

Quarter-finals; Best of 9 frames
(Scotland) Marcus Campbell	1
(England) Ronnie O'Sullivan	5
(England) Stephen Lee	5
(England) Chris Scanlon	0
(Scotland) John Higgins	5
(Scotland) Euan Henderson	4
(Republic of Ireland) Fergal O'Brien	5
(Republic of Ireland) Ken Doherty	4

Semi-finals; Best of 11 frames
(England) Ronnie O'Sullivan	6
(England) Stephen Lee	2
(Scotland) John Higgins	6
(Republic of Ireland) Fergal O'Brien	2

Final; Best of 17 frames
(England) Ronnie O'Sullivan	9
(Scotland) John Higgins	5

== Final ==
Final: Best of 17 frames. AECC, Aberdeen, Scotland. 22 February 1998.
Ronnie O'Sullivan; England	9–5	John Higgins; Scotland
Afternoon: 91–0, 59–69, 23–70 (57), 79–37 (78), 23–72, 51–44, 93–0 (62), 94–0 (81); Evening: 94–9 (80), 24–69 (62), 0–88 (88), 77–22, 75–7, 98–5 (97)
97	Highest break	88
0	Century breaks	0
5	50+ breaks	3
