= 1994 British Open =

Tournament information
- Dates: 30 March – 7 April 1994
- Venue: Plymouth Pavilions
- City: Plymouth
- Country: England
- Organisation: WPBSA
- Format: Ranking event
- Total prize fund: £200,000
- Winner's share: £36,000
- Highest break: Chris Small (SCO) (140)

Final
- Champion: Ronnie O'Sullivan (ENG)
- Runner-up: James Wattana (THA)
- Score: 9–4

The 1994 British Open was a professional ranking snooker tournament, that was held from 30 March to 7 April 1994 at the Plymouth Pavilions, Plymouth, England.

Ronnie O'Sullivan won the tournament by defeating James Wattana 9–4 in the final. The defending champion Steve Davis was defeated in the semi-final by Wattana.

There were three notable factors in this year's tournament: There was no title sponsor, there was a new venue, and there was no TV coverage after 14 years of being shown on ITV.

== Main draw ==
Last 64; Best of 9 frames
(England) Steve Davis	5
(Scotland) Paul McPhillips	2
(England) Brian Morgan	5
(England) Tony Jones	0
(England) Andy Hicks	5
(England) Neal Foulds	2
(England) Mike Hallett	5
(Scotland) Chris Small	4
(Northern Ireland) Dennis Taylor	5
(Northern Ireland) Jason Prince	2
(Wales) Doug Mountjoy	5
(England) Ian Graham	1
(England) Dave Harold	5
(Wales) Terry Griffiths	2
(England) Darryn Walker	5
(England) Tony Knowles	4
(England) Jimmy White	5
(Scotland) Billy Snaddon	0
(Wales) Dominic Dale	5
(England) Dean Reynolds	3
(England) Rod Lawler	5
(England) Martin Clark	4
(Malta) Tony Drago	5
(England) Matthew Couch	2
(Wales) Darren Morgan	5
(Republic of Ireland) Stephen Murphy	3
(Scotland) John Higgins	5
(Wales) Mark Bennett	0
(England) Mark Johnston-Allen	5
(England) Nick Terry	3
(Thailand) James Wattana	5
(England) Danny Fowler	2
(England) Ronnie O'Sullivan	5
(England) Peter Ebdon	4
(England) Willie Thorne	5
(Wales) Mark Williams	3
(England) Mick Price	5
(India) Yasin Merchant	3
(Republic of Ireland) Ken Doherty	5
(South Africa) Peter Francisco	4
(England) Nigel Bond	5
(England) Anton Bishop	1
(Canada) Alain Robidoux	5
(Canada) Jim Wych	3
(Northern Ireland) Joe Swail	5
(England) Brian Rowswell	3
(England) John Parrott	5
(Republic of Ireland) Eugene Hughes	1
(Scotland) Alan McManus	5
(England) Tony Meo	2
(England) Joe Johnson	5
(England) Nigel Gilbert	2
(England) David Roe	5
(England) Jamie Bodle	2
(England) Antony Bolsover	5
(England) Gary Wilkinson	3
(England) Steve James	5
(England) David Rippon	1
(England) Jason Ferguson	5
(England) Ian Brumby	1
(New Zealand) Dene O'Kane	5
(Republic of Ireland) Stephen O'Connor	4
(Scotland) Stephen Hendry	5
(Canada) Cliff Thorburn	2

Last 32; Best of 9 frames
(England) Steve Davis	5
(England) Brian Morgan	1
(England) Andy Hicks	5
(England) Mike Hallett	4
(Northern Ireland) Dennis Taylor	4
(Wales) Doug Mountjoy	5
(England) Dave Harold	5
(England) Darryn Walker	4
(England) Jimmy White	5
(Wales) Dominic Dale	2
(England) Rod Lawler	2
(Malta) Tony Drago	5
(Wales) Darren Morgan	5
(Scotland) John Higgins	4
(England) Mark Johnston-Allen	2
(Thailand) James Wattana	5
(England) Ronnie O'Sullivan	5
(England) Willie Thorne	1
(England) Mick Price	1
(Republic of Ireland) Ken Doherty	5
(England) Nigel Bond	5
(Canada) Alain Robidoux	3
(Northern Ireland) Joe Swail	1
(England) John Parrott	5
(Scotland) Alan McManus	5
(England) Joe Johnson	2
(England) David Roe	3
(England) Antony Bolsover	5
(England) Steve James	3
(England) Jason Ferguson	5
(New Zealand) Dene O'Kane	2
(Scotland) Stephen Hendry	5

Last 16; Best of 9 frames
(England) Steve Davis	5
(England) Andy Hicks	4
(Wales) Doug Mountjoy	5
(England) Dave Harold	3
(England) Jimmy White	2
(Malta) Tony Drago	5
(Wales) Darren Morgan	4
(Thailand) James Wattana	5
(England) Ronnie O'Sullivan	5
(Republic of Ireland) Ken Doherty	4
(England) Nigel Bond	5
(England) John Parrott	3
(Scotland) Alan McManus	5
(England) Antony Bolsover	1
(England) Jason Ferguson	3
(Scotland) Stephen Hendry	5

Quarter-finals; Best of 9 frames
(England) Steve Davis	5
(Wales) Doug Mountjoy	0
(Malta) Tony Drago	0
(Thailand) James Wattana	5
(England) Ronnie O'Sullivan	5
(England) Nigel Bond	0
(Scotland) Alan McManus	4
(Scotland) Stephen Hendry	5

Semi-finals; Best of 11 frames
(England) Steve Davis	4
(Thailand) James Wattana	6
(England) Ronnie O'Sullivan	6
(Scotland) Stephen Hendry	2

Final; Best of 17 frames
(Thailand) James Wattana	4
(England) Ronnie O'Sullivan	9

== Final ==
Final: Best of 17 frames. Referee: Len Ganley; Plymouth Pavilions, Plymouth, England. 7 April 1994.
Ronnie O'Sullivan; England	9–4	James Wattana; Thailand
Afternoon: 76–20 (67), 73–42, 59–25, 38–74, 70–41 (58), 112–0 (112), 18–103, 91–33 (90); Evening: 29–56, 69–14 (52), 58–38, 16–74, 70–10 (70)
112	Highest break	
1	Century breaks	0
6	50+ breaks	0
