= 1995 British Open =

1995 Castella Classic British Open
Tournament information
- Dates: 1–9 April 1995
- Venue: Plymouth Pavilions
- City: Plymouth
- Country: England
- Organisation: WPBSA
- Format: Ranking event
- Total prize fund: £325,000
- Winner's share: £60,000
- Highest break: Stephen Hendry (SCO) (145)

Final
- Champion: John Higgins (SCO)
- Runner-up: Ronnie O'Sullivan (ENG)
- Score: 9–6

The 1995 British Open (officially the 1995 Castella Classic British Open) was a professional ranking snooker tournament, that was held from 1–9 April 1995 at the Plymouth Pavilions, Plymouth, England.

John Higgins won the tournament by defeating the defending champion Ronnie O'Sullivan nine frames to six in the final.

== Prize fund ==
The breakdown of prize money for this year is shown below:

- Winner: £60,000
- Runner Up: £32,000
- Semi Finalists: £16,000
- Quarter Finalist: £9,050
- Last 16: £4,550
- Last 32: £2,600
- Last 64: £1,900
- Last 96: £700
- Stage one highest break: £1,200
- Stage two highest break: £2,400
- Total: £325,000

== Main draw ==
Last 64; Best of 9 frames
(England) Ronnie O'Sullivan	5
(Wales) Steve Newbury	1
(Northern Ireland) Dennis Taylor	5
(England) Mark Johnston-Allen	4
(England) Stephen Lee	5
(England) David Roe	3
(New Zealand) Dene O'Kane	5
(Canada) Jim Wych	3
(England) Jonathan Birch	5
(Malta) Tony Drago	4
(Canada) Alain Robidoux	5
(Northern Ireland) Terry Murphy	2
(Scotland) Alan McManus	5
(England) Anthony Hamilton	2
(England) Dave Harold	5
(Wales) Anthony Davies	2
(England) Jimmy White	5
(Wales) Mark Flowerdew	1
(England) Steve James	5
(Northern Ireland) Alex Higgins	3
(Scotland) Chris Small	5
(England) Willie Thorne	2
(England) Mick Price	5
(England) Neil Mosley	2
(England) Peter Ebdon	5
(England) Dave Finbow	1
(Wales) Wayne Jones	5
(England) Brian Morgan	1
(Thailand) James Wattana	5
(England) Nick Terry	2
(England) Dean Reynolds	5
(England) Tony Jones	2
(England) Steve Davis	5
(Wales) Paul Davies	4
(England) Tony Knowles	5
(England) Nick Dyson	2
(Scotland) Billy Snaddon	5
(Northern Ireland) Joe Swail	4
(England) Martin Clark	5
(Republic of Ireland) Stephen Murphy	0
(Scotland) John Higgins	5
(Wales) Terry Griffiths	1
(England) Karl Broughton	5
(Wales) Doug Mountjoy	1
(Republic of Ireland) Ken Doherty	5
(Northern Ireland) Jason Prince	0
(England) Mike Hallett	5
(England) Ian Graham	3
(England) John Parrott	5
(Thailand) Suriya Suwannasingh	3
(England) Jason Ferguson	5
(Wales) Tony Chappel	2
(Wales) Darren Morgan	5
(England) Nick Walker	2
(England) Neal Foulds	5
(England) John Burns	0
(England) Nigel Bond	5
(Wales) Mark Williams	2
(South Africa) Peter Francisco	5
(Wales) Mark Bennett	4
(Scotland) Stephen Hendry	5
(Republic of Ireland) Michael Judge	1
(Scotland) Drew Henry	5
(England) Gary Wilkinson	3

Last 32; Best of 9 frames
(England) Ronnie O'Sullivan	5
(Northern Ireland) Dennis Taylor	4
(England) Stephen Lee	4
(New Zealand) Dene O'Kane	5
(England) Jonathan Birch	3
(Canada) Alain Robidoux	5
(Scotland) Alan McManus	1
(England) Dave Harold	5
(England) Jimmy White	5
(England) Steve James	0
(Scotland) Chris Small	2
(England) Mick Price	5
(England) Peter Ebdon	5
(Wales) Wayne Jones	1
(Thailand) James Wattana	5
(England) Dean Reynolds	2
(England) Steve Davis	5
(England) Tony Knowles	4
(Scotland) Billy Snaddon	4
(England) Martin Clark	5
(Scotland) John Higgins	5
(England) Karl Broughton	0
(Republic of Ireland) Ken Doherty	3
(England) Mike Hallett	5
(England) John Parrott	5
(England) Jason Ferguson	1
(Wales) Darren Morgan	3
(England) Neal Foulds	5
(England) Nigel Bond	3
(South Africa) Peter Francisco	5
(Scotland) Stephen Hendry	5
(Scotland) Drew Henry	3

Last 16; Best of 9 frames
(England) Ronnie O'Sullivan	5
(New Zealand) Dene O'Kane	1
(Canada) Alain Robidoux	2
(England) Dave Harold	5
(England) Jimmy White	2
(England) Mick Price	5
(England) Peter Ebdon	2
(Thailand) James Wattana	5
(England) Steve Davis	5
(England) Martin Clark	4
(Scotland) John Higgins	5
(England) Mike Hallett	0
(England) John Parrott	5
(England) Neal Foulds	3
(South Africa) Peter Francisco	2
(Scotland) Stephen Hendry	5

Quarter-finals; Best of 9 frames
(England) Ronnie O'Sullivan	5
(England) Dave Harold	4
(England) Mick Price	1
(Thailand) James Wattana	5
(England) Steve Davis	2
(Scotland) John Higgins	5
(England) John Parrott	5
(Scotland) Stephen Hendry	1

Semi-finals; Best of 11 frames
(England) Ronnie O'Sullivan	6
(Thailand) James Wattana	4
(Scotland) John Higgins	6
(England) John Parrott	2

Final; Best of 17 frames
(England) Ronnie O'Sullivan	6
(Scotland) John Higgins	9

== Final ==
Final: Best of 17 frames. Referee: Jan Verhass; Plymouth Pavilions, Plymouth, England. 9 April 1995.
John Higgins; Scotland	9–6	Ronnie O'Sullivan; England
Afternoon: 44–76 (76), 0–131 (117), 81–7 (55), 67–0, 9–93 (89), 120–8 (119), 84–8 (62), 80–35 (79); Evening: 44–76 (76), 132–7 (132), 5–67 (67), 55–66, 69–39, 22–67 (67), 74–38
132	Highest break	117
2	Century breaks	1
5	50+ breaks	6
