= 1993 Humo European Open =

1993 Humo European Open may refer to:

- 1993 European Open (1992/1993), a snooker tournament that took place in February 1993
- 1993 European Open (1993/1994), a snooker tournament that took place in December 1993

== See also ==
- European Masters (snooker)
