= Euan Henderson (snooker player) =

Scottish snooker player

Personal information
- Born: 30 June 1967 (age 59) Melbourne, Australia

Sport
- Country: Scotland
- Sport: Snooker
- Professional: 1991–2003
- Highest ranking: 38 (1997–98)
- Best ranking finish: Runner-up (x1)

Euan Henderson (born 30 June 1967) is a retired Scottish professional snooker player.

== Career ==
In his twelve-year professional career he reached only one ranking final, in the 1996 Grand Prix, albeit without beating any of the game's established leading players. His 6–3 semi-final win over the Welsh veteran Mark Bennett (who had knocked out several of the game's big names – including Chris Small, Peter Ebdon, Steve Davis and Tony Drago en route to the semi-final stage) did see him take out that tournament's in-form player. However, Mark Williams proved too strong for Henderson in the final. Henderson took the opening frame and also led 3–2 at one point, but lost 9–5 to Williams. This tournament, besides having two surprise semi-finalists in Henderson and Bennett, made headlines because many of the pre-tournament favourites (including the reigning world champion and world No.1 Stephen Hendry, Alan McManus, Peter Ebdon and Nigel Bond) were all knocked out in the first round.

In the 1994 Grand Prix competition he had his first high-profile victory, beating Jimmy White to reach the last 16.

After retiring from snooker in 2003, Henderson became a police officer.

== Performance and rankings timeline ==
Tournament	1990/ 91	1991/ 92	1992/ 93	1993/ 94	1994/ 95	1995/ 96	1996/ 97	1997/ 98	1998/ 99	1999/ 00	2000/ 01	2001/ 02	2002/ 03
Ranking	(Note: He was an amateur.)	(Note: New players on the Main Tour do not have a ranking.)	128	107	119	90	62	44	38	43	48	75	67
Ranking tournaments
LG Cup (Note: The event was also called the Grand Prix (1990/1991–2000/2001))	A	LQ	LQ	LQ	3R	LQ	F	1R	2R	1R	LQ	LQ	LQ
British Open	A	LQ	LQ	LQ	LQ	LQ	LQ	LQ	LQ	LQ	LQ	1R	1R
UK Championship	A	LQ	LQ	LQ	1R	LQ	LQ	LQ	1R	LQ	LQ	LQ	1R
Welsh Open	NH	1R	LQ	LQ	LQ	LQ	1R	1R	LQ	LQ	LQ	LQ	LQ
European Open (Note: The event was also called the Irish Open (1998/1999))	A	LQ	LQ	LQ	LQ	LQ	1R	NH	LQ	Not Held		LQ	LQ
Irish Masters	Non-Ranking Event												A
Scottish Open (Note: The event was also called the International Open (1992/1993–1996/1997))	Not Held		LQ	LQ	QF	LQ	1R	QF	1R	LQ	1R	LQ	WD
World Championship	A	LQ	LQ	LQ	LQ	1R	LQ	LQ	LQ	LQ	LQ	LQ	WD
Non-ranking tournaments
Scottish Masters	A	A	A	A	A	A	A	A	A	LQ	A	A	A
Benson and Hedges Championship	A	1R	4R	2R	2R	3R	LQ	2R	2R	2R	A	A	A
The Masters	A	LQ	LQ	LQ	LQ	LQ	LQ	LQ	LQ	LQ	A	A	A
Former ranking tournaments
Classic	A	LQ	Tournament Not Held										
Strachan Open	NH	LQ	MR	NR	Tournament Not Held								
Asian Classic (Note: The event was also called the Dubai Classic (1989/90–1994/1995) and Thailand Classic (1995/1996))	A	LQ	LQ	LQ	LQ	LQ	LQ	Tournament Not Held					
German Open	Tournament Not Held					LQ	LQ	LQ	Tournament Not Held				
Malta Grand Prix	Tournament Not Held				Non-Ranking Event					LQ	NR	Not Held	
China Open (Note: The event was also called the China International (1997/1998–1998/1999))	Tournament Not Held							NR	LQ	LQ	LQ	LQ	NH
Thailand Masters (Note: The event was also called the Asian Open (1989/1990–1992/1993) and the Thailand Open (1993/1994–1996/1997))	A	LQ	LQ	LQ	LQ	LQ	LQ	LQ	2R	LQ	LQ	LQ	NR
Former non-ranking tournaments
World Masters	2R	Tournament Not Held											

Performance Table Legend
LQ	lost in the qualifying draw	#R	lost in the early rounds of the tournament (WR = Wildcard round, RR = Round robin)	QF	lost in the quarter-finals
SF	lost in the semi-finals	F	lost in the final	W	won the tournament
DNQ	did not qualify for the tournament	A	did not participate in the tournament	WD	withdrew from the tournament

NH / Not Held	means an event was not held.
NR / Non-Ranking Event	means an event is/was no longer a ranking event.
R / Ranking Event	means an event is/was a ranking event.

== Career finals ==
=== Ranking finals: 1 ===
Outcome	No.	Year	Championship	Opponent in the final	Score
Runner-up	1.	1996	Grand Prix	(Wales) Mark Williams	5–9
