= 1998–99 snooker world rankings =

No. 1: John Higgins
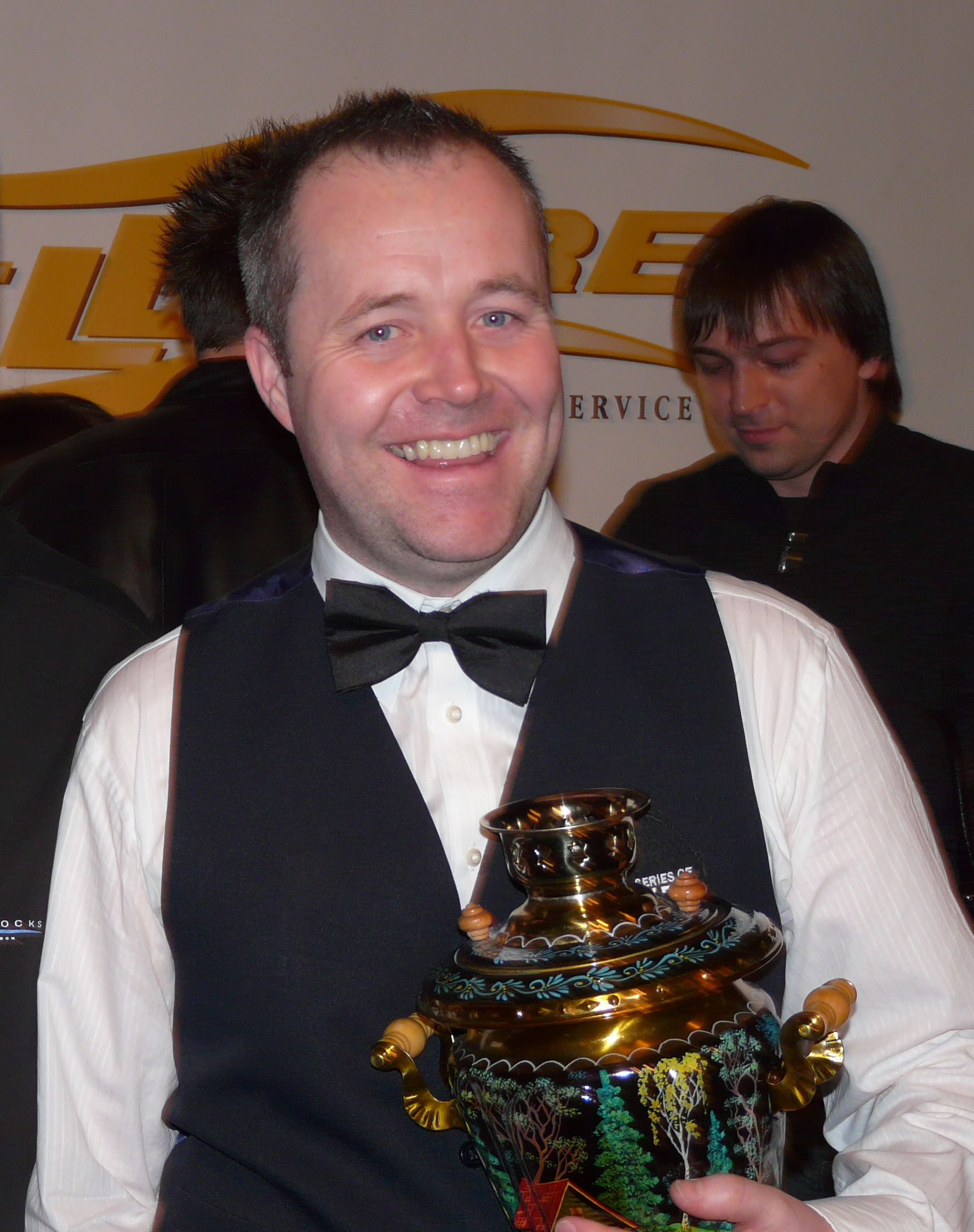

Personal information
- Born: May 18, 1975 (age 51)

Sport
- Country: Scotland
- Sport: Snooker
- Professional: 1992–present
- Highest ranking: 1

Preceded by 1997–98	1998–99	Succeeded by 1999–2000

1998–99 snooker world rankings: The professional world rankings for the top 64 snooker players in the 1998‍–‍99 season are listed below.

No. 2: Stephen Hendry
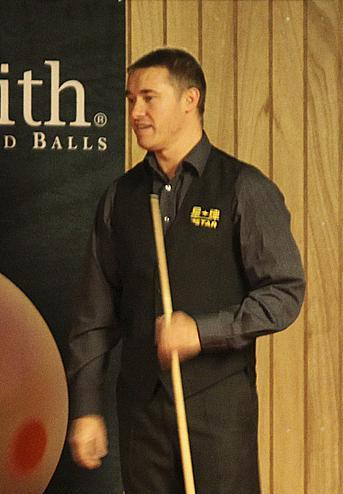

Personal information
- Born: January 13, 1969 (age 57)

Sport
- Country: Scotland
- Sport: Snooker
- Professional: 1985–2012, 2020–2024
- Highest ranking: 1

No. 3: Ronnie O'Sullivan
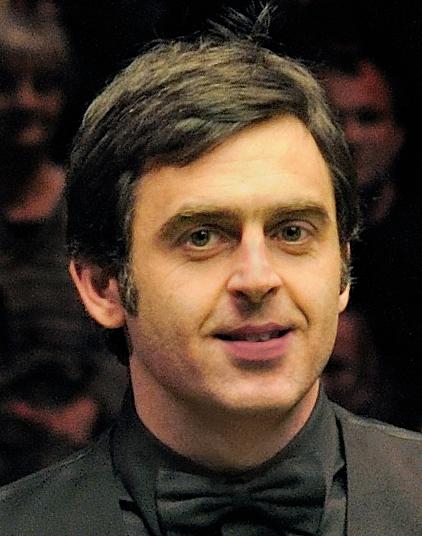

Personal information
- Born: December 5, 1975 (age 50)

Sport
- Country: England
- Sport: Snooker
- Professional: 1992–present
- Highest ranking: 1

No.	Name	Nationality	Points
1	John Higgins	Scotland	47422
2	Stephen Hendry	Scotland	47247
3	Ronnie O'Sullivan	England	39407
4	Ken Doherty	Ireland	36167
5	Mark Williams	Wales	32755
6	John Parrott	England	31757
7	Peter Ebdon	England	25426
8	Alan McManus	Scotland	24394
9	Stephen Lee	England	24264
10	Tony Drago	Malta	23809
11	Anthony Hamilton	England	22524
12	Alain Robidoux	Canada	22387
13	Nigel Bond	England	22256
14	Steve Davis	England	22252
15	James Wattana	Thailand	21542
16	Mark King	England	21470
17	Gary Wilkinson	England	19084
18	Jimmy White	England	18995
19	Dave Harold	England	18410
20	Fergal O'Brien	Ireland	18152
21	Andy Hicks	England	17808
22	Darren Morgan	Wales	17804
23	Dominic Dale	Wales	17622
24	Paul Hunter	England	17155
25	Chris Small	Scotland	17026
26	Matthew Stevens	Wales	16935
27	Brian Morgan	England	16227
28	Martin Clark	England	16137
29	Terry Murphy	Northern Ireland	16047
30	Graeme Dott	Scotland	15589
31	Jamie Burnett	Scotland	15542
32	Billy Snaddon	Scotland	15042
33	Mick Price	England	14976
34	Neal Foulds	England	14915
35	Jason Ferguson	England	14802
36	Joe Swail	Northern Ireland	14595
37	Steve James	England	14209
38	Euan Henderson	Scotland	14084
39	Jason Prince	Northern Ireland	13992
40	Rod Lawler	England	13112
41	Paul Davies	Wales	12814
42	Jonathan Birch	England	12742
43	Drew Henry	Scotland	12647
44	Bradley Jones	England	12345
45	Quinten Hann	Australia	12182
46	Karl Broughton	England	12027
47	Tony Chappel	Wales	11952
48	David Roe	England	11875
49	Shokat Ali	Pakistan	11817
50	Lee Walker	Wales	11761
51	Willie Thorne	England	11715
52	Dennis Taylor	Northern Ireland	11648
53	Peter Lines	England	11642
54	Dean Reynolds	England	11534
55	Joe Johnson	England	11515
56	Mark Davis	England	11511
57	Dene O'Kane	New Zealand	11500
58	Michael Judge	Ireland	11477
59	Gerard Greene	Northern Ireland	11332
60	Ian McCulloch	England	11115
61	David Gray	England	11089
62	Paul Wykes	England	11077
63	Tony Jones	England	11035
64	Nick Pearce	England	10930
65	Stefan Mazrocis	England	10910
66	Mark Bennett	Wales	10834
67	Chris Scanlon	England	10752
68	David Finbow	England	10692
69	Karl Burrows	England	10640
70	John Read	England	10567
71	Nick Walker	England	10540
72	Sean Storey	England	10487
73	Marcus Campbell	Scotland	10195
74	Joe Perry	England	10184
75	Gary Ponting	England	10180
76	Stuart Pettman	England	9890
77	Alfie Burden	England	9841
78	Matthew Couch	England	9775
79	Steve Judd	England	9650
80	Wayne Brown	England	9595
81	Jimmy Michie	England	9464
82	Wayne Jones	Wales	9374
83	Martin Dziewialtowski	Scotland	9022
84	Jamie Woodman	England	8957
85	Anthony Davies	Wales	8787
86	Stephen O'Connor	Ireland	8612
87	Darren Clarke	England	8492
88	Troy Shaw	England	8252
89	Lee Richardson	England	8047
90	Ian Brumby	England	7957
91	Karl Payne	England	7719
92	Mark Gray	England	7710
93	Leigh Griffin	England	7508
94	John Lardner	Scotland	7389
95	Peter McCullagh	England	6936
96	Craig MacGillivray	Scotland	6434
99	Robert Milkins	England	
150	Patrick Wallace	Northern Ireland	
164	Stuart Bingham	England	
187	Ali Carter	England	
193	Michael Holt	England	
377	Marco Fu	Hong Kong	
