= 1994 Welsh Open (snooker) =

1994 Regal Welsh Open
Tournament information
- Dates: 30 January – 5 February 1994
- Venue: Newport Leisure Centre
- City: Newport
- Country: Wales
- Organisation: WPBSA
- Format: Ranking event
- Total prize fund: £150,000
- Winner's share: £27,000
- Highest break: Dave Harold (ENG) (140)

Final
- Champion: Steve Davis (ENG)
- Runner-up: Alan McManus (SCO)
- Score: 9–6

The 1994 Welsh Open (officially the 1994 Regal Welsh Open) was a professional ranking snooker tournament that took place between 30 January and 5 February 1994 at the Newport Leisure Centre in Newport, Wales.

Ken Doherty was the defending champion, but lost in the third round to David Roe.

Steve Davis defeated Alan McManus 9–6 in the final to win his first Welsh Open title.

== Main draw ==
Last 64; Best of 9 frames
(England) Steve Davis	5
(England) Ian McCulloch	2
(England) Anthony Hamilton	5
(Canada) Alain Robidoux	1
(Scotland) Paul McPhillips	5
(England) Dean Reynolds	3
(England) Ronnie O'Sullivan	5
(England) Neal Foulds	1
(England) David Roe	5
(Canada) Jim Wych	9
(Northern Ireland) Gerard Greene	5
(New Zealand) Dene O'Kane	4
(Republic of Ireland) Ken Doherty	5
(Scotland) Billy Snaddon	0
(England) Jonathan Birch	5
(England) Mark Johnston-Allen	1
(Thailand) James Wattana	5
(England) Les Dodd	0
(England) Dave Finbow	5
(Wales) Doug Mountjoy	2
(England) Steve James	5
(England) Stephen Lee	1
(Wales) Mark Bennett	5
(England) Brian Morgan	3
(England) Jimmy White	5
(Scotland) Jamie Burnett	3
(England) Jason Ferguson	5
(Northern Ireland) Jason Prince	4
(England) Nick Terry	5
(England) Tony Jones	2
(England) Mark Flowerdew	5
(Wales) Terry Griffiths	3
(Scotland) Alan McManus	5
(England) Lee Richardson	2
(England) Gary Wilkinson	5
(England) Colin Kelly	3
(Northern Ireland) Joe Swail	5
(Republic of Ireland) Joe Delaney	1
(Republic of Ireland) Stephen O'Connor	5
(Northern Ireland) Dennis Taylor	4
(Scotland) Stephen Hendry	5
(Wales) Steve Newbury	2
(Malta) Tony Drago	5
(England) Nick Dyson	3
(Wales) Darren Morgan	5
(England) Paul Davison	2
(England) Tony Knowles	5
(Wales) Tony Chappel	1
(England) Peter Ebdon	5
(Republic of Ireland) Stephen Murphy	2
(England) Martin Clark	5
(England) Sean Storey	4
(Republic of Ireland) Fergal O'Brien	5
(England) Mike Hallett	2
(England) John Parrott	5
(England) Nigel Gilbert	1
(England) Dave Harold	5
(England) Joe Johnson	2
(England) Andy Hicks	5
(England) Willie Thorne	2
(England) Nigel Bond	5
(Republic of Ireland) Jimmy Long	1
(Scotland) Drew Henry	5
(England) Mick Price	4

Last 32; Best of 9 frames
(England) Steve Davis	5
(England) Anthony Hamilton	0
(Scotland) Paul McPhillips	5
(England) Ronnie O'Sullivan	3
(England) David Roe	5
(Northern Ireland) Gerard Greene	4
(Republic of Ireland) Ken Doherty	5
(England) Jonathan Birch	2
(Thailand) James Wattana	5
(England) Dave Finbow	1
(England) Steve James	5
(Wales) Mark Bennett	4
(England) Jimmy White	5
(England) Jason Ferguson	1
(England) Nick Terry	5
(England) Mark Flowerdew	4
(Scotland) Alan McManus	5
(England) Gary Wilkinson	0
(Northern Ireland) Joe Swail	5
(Republic of Ireland) Stephen O'Connor	1
(Scotland) Stephen Hendry	5
(Malta) Tony Drago	1
(Wales) Darren Morgan	5
(England) Tony Knowles	3
(England) Peter Ebdon	5
(England) Martin Clark	0
(Republic of Ireland) Fergal O'Brien	5
(England) John Parrott	4
(England) Dave Harold	5
(England) Andy Hicks	3
(England) Nigel Bond	5
(Scotland) Drew Henry	3

Last 16; Best of 9 frames
(England) Steve Davis	5
(Scotland) Paul McPhillips	0
(England) David Roe	5
(Republic of Ireland) Ken Doherty	2
(Thailand) James Wattana	5
(England) Steve James	4
(England) Jimmy White	5
(England) Nick Terry	4
(Scotland) Alan McManus	5
(Northern Ireland) Joe Swail	2
(Scotland) Stephen Hendry	5
(Wales) Darren Morgan	3
(England) Peter Ebdon	5
(Republic of Ireland) Fergal O'Brien	4
(England) Dave Harold	5
(England) Nigel Bond	3

Quarter-finals; Best of 9 frames
(England) Steve Davis	5
(England) David Roe	0
(Thailand) James Wattana	5
(England) Jimmy White	3
(Scotland) Alan McManus	5
(Scotland) Stephen Hendry	4
(England) Peter Ebdon	5
(England) Dave Harold	4

Semi-finals; Best of 11 frames
(England) Steve Davis	6
(Thailand) James Wattana	1
(Scotland) Alan McManus	6
(England) Peter Ebdon	2

Final; Best of 17 frames
(England) Steve Davis	9
(Scotland) Alan McManus	6
