= 1995 UK Championship =

1995 Royal Liver Assurance UK Championship
Tournament information
- Dates: 17 November – 3 December 1995
- Venue: Preston Guild Hall
- City: Preston
- Country: England
- Organisation: WPBSA
- Format: Ranking event
- Winner's share: £60,000
- Highest break: Stephen Hendry (SCO) (147)

Final
- Champion: Stephen Hendry (SCO)
- Runner-up: Peter Ebdon (ENG)
- Score: 10–3

The 1995 UK Championship (officially the 1995 Royal Liver Assurance UK Championship) was a professional ranking snooker tournament that took place at the Guild Hall in Preston, England. The event started on 17 November 1995 and the televised stages were shown on the BBC between 25 November and 3 December 1995.

Stephen Hendry won his fourth UK title by defeating Peter Ebdon 10–3. Hendry also made the first maximum break in the televised stage of the UK Championship, against Gary Wilkinson. Willie Thorne had made one in 1987, and Ebdon himself made one in the qualifying stage in 1992, but neither were televised. Hendry also cleared a 146 in the last frame of the final to win 10–3 against Ebdon.

== Prize fund ==
The breakdown of prize money for this year is shown below:

- Winner: £60,000
- Runner-up: £32,000
- Semi-final: £16,000
- Quarter-finalists: £9,050
- Last 16: £4,550
- Last 32: £2,600
- Last 64: £1,900

== Main draw ==
=== Top half ===
Round 1 (Last 64); Best of 17 frames
(Scotland) Stephen Hendry	9
(Scotland) Jamie Burnett	3
(England) Anthony Hamilton	9
(England) Stuart Pettman	3
(Wales) Terry Griffiths	9
(Northern Ireland) Dylan Leary	3
(England) Gary Wilkinson	9
(Northern Ireland) Jason Prince	4
(England) Jason Ferguson	9
(England) Karl Broughton	6
(Republic of Ireland) Ken Doherty	9
(Scotland) Drew Henry	8
(Northern Ireland) Dennis Taylor	9
(England) Jimmy Michie	2
(Wales) Darren Morgan	9
(England) David Finbow	3
(England) Jimmy White	9
(England) Matt Wilson	5
(England) Brian Morgan	6
(England) Stuart Reardon	9
(Scotland) John Higgins	9
(England) Mark King	3
(Canada) Alain Robidoux	9
(England) Karl Payne	4
(Northern Ireland) Joe Swail	6
(Wales) Mark Williams	9
(Malta) Tony Drago	9
(England) Tony Jones	1
(England) Willie Thorne	9
(England) Tony Meo	6
(England) John Parrott	9
(England) Jamie Woodman	2

Round 2 (Last 32); Best of 17 frames
(Scotland) Stephen Hendry	9
(England) Anthony Hamilton	3
(Wales) Terry Griffiths	3
(England) Gary Wilkinson	9
(England) Jason Ferguson	4
(Republic of Ireland) Ken Doherty	9
(Northern Ireland) Dennis Taylor	9
(Wales) Darren Morgan	8
(England) Jimmy White	9
(England) Stuart Reardon	4
(Scotland) John Higgins	9
(Canada) Alain Robidoux	1
(Wales) Mark Williams	9
(Malta) Tony Drago	7
(England) Willie Thorne	3
(England) John Parrott	9

Round 3 (Last 16); Best of 17 frames
(Scotland) Stephen Hendry	9
(England) Gary Wilkinson	2
(Republic of Ireland) Ken Doherty	9
(Northern Ireland) Dennis Taylor	1
(England) Jimmy White	6
(Scotland) John Higgins	9
(Wales) Mark Williams	9
(England) John Parrott	6

Quarter-finals; Best of 17 frames
(Scotland) Stephen Hendry	9
(Republic of Ireland) Ken Doherty	3
(Scotland) John Higgins	9
(Wales) Mark Williams	6

Semi-finals; Best of 17 frames
(Scotland) Stephen Hendry	9
(Scotland) John Higgins	1

=== Bottom half ===
Round 1 (Last 64); Best of 17 frames
(England) Ronnie O'Sullivan	9
(England) Steve Meakin	3
(England) Mick Price	6
(Wales) Paul Davies	9
(England) David Roe	7
(Scotland) Chris Small	9
(England) Martin Clark	4
(England) Mark Flowerdew	9
(England) Andy Hicks	9
(Northern Ireland) Gerard Greene	5
(England) Dave Harold	7
(Wales) Mark Bennett	9
(New Zealand) Dene O'Kane	9
(England) Mark Johnston-Allen	4
(Thailand) James Wattana	9
(England) Darryn Walker	4
(England) Nigel Bond	9
(England) Surinder Gill	3
(England) Tony Knowles	9
(England) Jon Birch	7
(Scotland) Alan McManus	4
(England) Paul Hunter	9
(England) Dean Reynolds	5
(Wales) Wayne Jones	9
(England) Peter Ebdon	9
(England) Barry Pinches	7
(England) Steve James	4
(Wales) Matthew Stevens	9
(England) Neal Foulds	9
(Wales) Doug Mountjoy	5
(England) Steve Davis	6
(England) Stephen Lee	9

Round 2 (Last 32); Best of 17 frames
(England) Ronnie O'Sullivan	9
(Wales) Paul Davies	4
(Scotland) Chris Small	9
(England) Mark Flowerdew	2
(England) Andy Hicks	9
(Wales) Mark Bennett	7
(New Zealand) Dene O'Kane	6
(Thailand) James Wattana	9
(England) Nigel Bond	9
(England) Tony Knowles	4
(England) Paul Hunter	6
(Wales) Wayne Jones	9
(England) Peter Ebdon	9
(Wales) Matthew Stevens	6
(England) Neal Foulds	7
(England) Stephen Lee	9

Round 3 (Last 16); Best of 17 frames
(England) Ronnie O'Sullivan	9
(Scotland) Chris Small	2
(England) Andy Hicks	9
(Thailand) James Wattana	8
(England) Nigel Bond	9
(Wales) Wayne Jones	2
(England) Peter Ebdon	9
(England) Stephen Lee	5

Quarter-finals; Best of 17 frames
(England) Ronnie O'Sullivan	7
(England) Andy Hicks	9
(England) Nigel Bond	7
(England) Peter Ebdon	9

Semi-finals; Best of 17 frames
(England) Andy Hicks	1
(England) Peter Ebdon	9

=== Final ===
Final: Best of 19 frames. Referee: Paul Harrison; The Guild Hall, Preston, England, 3 December 1995.
Stephen Hendry; Scotland	10–3	Peter Ebdon; England
First session: 118–0 (118), 83–21, 78–56 (Ebdon 56), 109–32 (79), 12–76 (76), 69–49 (66), 81–51 (69), 69–45 (52), 27–57; Second session: 2–109 (96), 69–27 (59), 77–41, 146–0 (146)
146	Highest break	96
2	Century breaks	0
7	50+ breaks	3

== Century breaks ==
Breaks shown in bold were made on the television stages.

- **147**, **146**, 133, **130**, 128, 118, **105**, **104**, **100** – Stephen Hendry
- 144, 106 – Tony Drago
- 143, 109, 106 – Matthew Stevens
- 143 – Darren Guest
- **137**, 126, 102, **100** – Andy Hicks
- 135, 108 – Ronnie O'Sullivan
- 135 – John Parrott
- 133 – Barry Pinches
- 129, 108 – Anthony Hamilton
- 127 – Alan McManus
- 126, 123, 108, 101 – John Higgins
- 126, 100 – Stuart Pettman
- 125, 112 – Paul Hunter
- 125 – James Wattana
- 122 – Darren Morgan
- 121 – Neal Foulds
- 118 – Mick Price
- 115 – Jimmy White
- **113** – Ken Doherty
- 112, 105 – Nick Pearce
- 111 – Mark Flowerdew
- **107**, 103 – Peter Ebdon
- 106, 101 – Chris Small
- 105 – Steve James
- 104, 103 – Drew Henry
- 104 – Tai Pichit
- 102 – Brian Morgan
- 101 – Martin Clark
