= Martin Clark (snooker player) =

English snooker player

Personal information
- Born: 27 October 1968 (age 57) Sedgley, England

Sport
- Country: England
- Sport: Snooker
- Professional: 1987–2001
- Highest ranking: 12 (1992/93, 1993/94)
- Best ranking finish: Quarter-final (x10)

Martin Clark (born 27 October 1968) is an English organiser of snooker tournaments and retired professional snooker player.

== Career ==
Born in Wolverhampton, in the West Midlands, he started playing snooker at 13 years-old. In 1984, he became the youngest winner of the British under-19 championship at the age of 15 years-old. In 1986, at the Home International series in Heysham, he compiled a break of 141 which was later ratified as the highest break made by a non-professional, superseding Joe Johnson's break of 140 in 1978. He turned professional in 1987, and within his first seven matches he recorded wins over Dennis Taylor and Neal Foulds, beating Taylor 5-0 which the former world champion described as "the best television debut any player has ever had".

Clark reached ten ranking tournament quarter-finals in his career, but never progressed any further. He reached the last 16 of the World Championship three times – 1991, 1992 and 1993, and also in 1992 reached the first major semi-final of his career at the World Matchplay by knocking out defending champion Gary Wilkinson. He won two non-ranking events, defeating Ray Reardon in the final of the European Grand Masters in 1990 and Andy Hicks in the Pontins Professional in 1997.

He retired as a pro player at a relatively young age, due to neck problems, and is now a tournament director. He has also helped with equipment maintenance (e.g. checking the replacement cloths) at the World Snooker Championship.

In November 2017, Belgian player Luca Brecel was forced to borrow clothes from Clark and fellow player Michael White after lifting the wrong suitcase at an airport in Shanghai.

== Performance and rankings timeline ==
Tournament	1987/ 88	1988/ 89	1989/ 90	1990/ 91	1991/ 92	1992/ 93	1993/ 94	1994/ 95	1995/ 96	1996/ 97	1997/ 98	1998/ 99	1999/ 00	2000/ 01
Ranking (Note: From the 2010/2011 season it shows the ranking at the beginning of the season.)	(Note: New players on the Main Tour do not have a ranking.)	41	17	12	14	12	12	18	22	33	27	28	37	66
Ranking tournaments
British Open	1R	QF	QF	2R	3R	2R	1R	3R	2R	3R	2R	1R	LQ	1R
Grand Prix	2R	1R	2R	2R	1R	2R	QF	2R	2R	2R	1R	1R	LQ	LQ
UK Championship	LQ	2R	2R	1R	3R	2R	3R	1R	1R	2R	1R	2R	LQ	WD
China Open (Note: The event was also called the China International (1997/1998–1998/1999))	Tournament Not Held										NR	LQ	LQ	LQ
Welsh Open	Tournament Not Held				2R	2R	2R	1R	1R	1R	1R	1R	LQ	LQ
Thailand Masters (Note: The event was also called the Asian Open (1989/1990 to 1992/1993) and Thailand Open (1993/1994 to 1996/1997).)	Not Held		QF	2R	QF	2R	1R	LQ	LQ	LQ	2R	LQ	LQ	A
Scottish Open (Note: The event was also called the International Open (1987/1988 to 1996/1997).)	3R	1R	2R	Not Held		1R	1R	1R	1R	1R	3R	1R	2R	A
World Championship	LQ	LQ	LQ	2R	2R	2R	1R	LQ	1R	LQ	LQ	LQ	LQ	WD
Non-ranking tournaments
The Masters	A	A	A	1R	1R	1R	1R	LQ	LQ	LQ	LQ	LQ	LQ	A
Former ranking tournaments
Canadian Masters	NH	1R	Tournament Not Held											
Hong Kong Open	Not Held		3R	Tournament Not Held										
Classic	3R	QF	3R	2R	QF	Tournament Not Held								
Strachan Open	Tournament Not Held				3R	MR	NR	Tournament Not Held						
German Open	Tournament Not Held						1R	2R	2R	NR	Tournament Not Held			
Dubai Classic (Note: The event was also called the Thailand Classic (1995/1996) and Asian Classic (1996/1997))	NH	NR	3R	3R	QF	1R	3R	QF	LQ	1R	Tournament Not Held			
Irish Open (Note: The event was also called the European Open (1987/1988-1996/1997))	NH	QF	2R	2R	3R	2R	2R	1R	LQ	1R	NH	LQ	Not Held	
Malta Grand Prix	Tournament Not Held							Non-Ranking Event					LQ	NR
Former non-ranking tournaments
Kent Cup	F	A	A	A	NH	A	Tournament Not Held							
English Professional Championship	1R	1R	Tournament Not Held											
Norwich Union Grand Prix	NH	A	QF	A	Tournament Not Held									
Shoot-Out	Not Held			2R	Tournament Not Held									
European Grand Masters	Not Held			W	Tournament Not Held									
London Masters	NH	A	A	QF	Tournament Not Held									
Belgian Masters	Not Held			A	QF	A	Not Held		A	Tournament Not Held				
World Matchplay	NH	A	A	QF	A	SF	Tournament Not Held							
Pot Black	A	A	A	A	1R	1R	1R	Tournament Not Held						
King's Cup	Not Held			A	NH	A	A	QF	Tournament Not Held					
Pontins Professional	A	SF	QF	QF	A	A	A	A	A	W	F	A	QF	NH

Performance Table Legend
LQ	lost in the qualifying draw	#R	lost in the early rounds of the tournament (WR = Wildcard round, RR = Round robin)	QF	lost in the quarter-finals
SF	lost in the semi-finals	F	lost in the final	W	won the tournament
DNQ	did not qualify for the tournament	A	did not participate in the tournament	WD	withdrew from the tournament

NH / Not Held	means an event was not held.
NR / Non-Ranking Event	means an event is/was no longer a ranking event.
R / Ranking Event	means an event is/was a ranking event.
MR / Minor-Ranking Event	means an event is/was a minor-ranking event.
PA / Pro-am Event	means an event is/was a pro-am event.

== Career finals ==
=== Non-ranking finals: 4 (2 titles) ===
Outcome	No.	Year	Championship	Opponent in the final	Score
Runner-up	1.	1988	Kent Cup	(England) John Parrott	1–5
Winner	1.	1990	European Grand Masters	(Wales) Ray Reardon	4–2
Winner	2.	1997	Pontins Professional	(England) Andy Hicks	9–7
Runner-up	2.	1998	Pontins Professional	(Wales) Mark Williams	6–9

=== Pro-am finals: 1 (1 title) ===
Outcome	No.	Year	Championship	Opponent in the final	Score
Winner	1.	1986	Warners Open	(England) Gary Keeble	5–2
