= Andy Hicks =

English snooker player

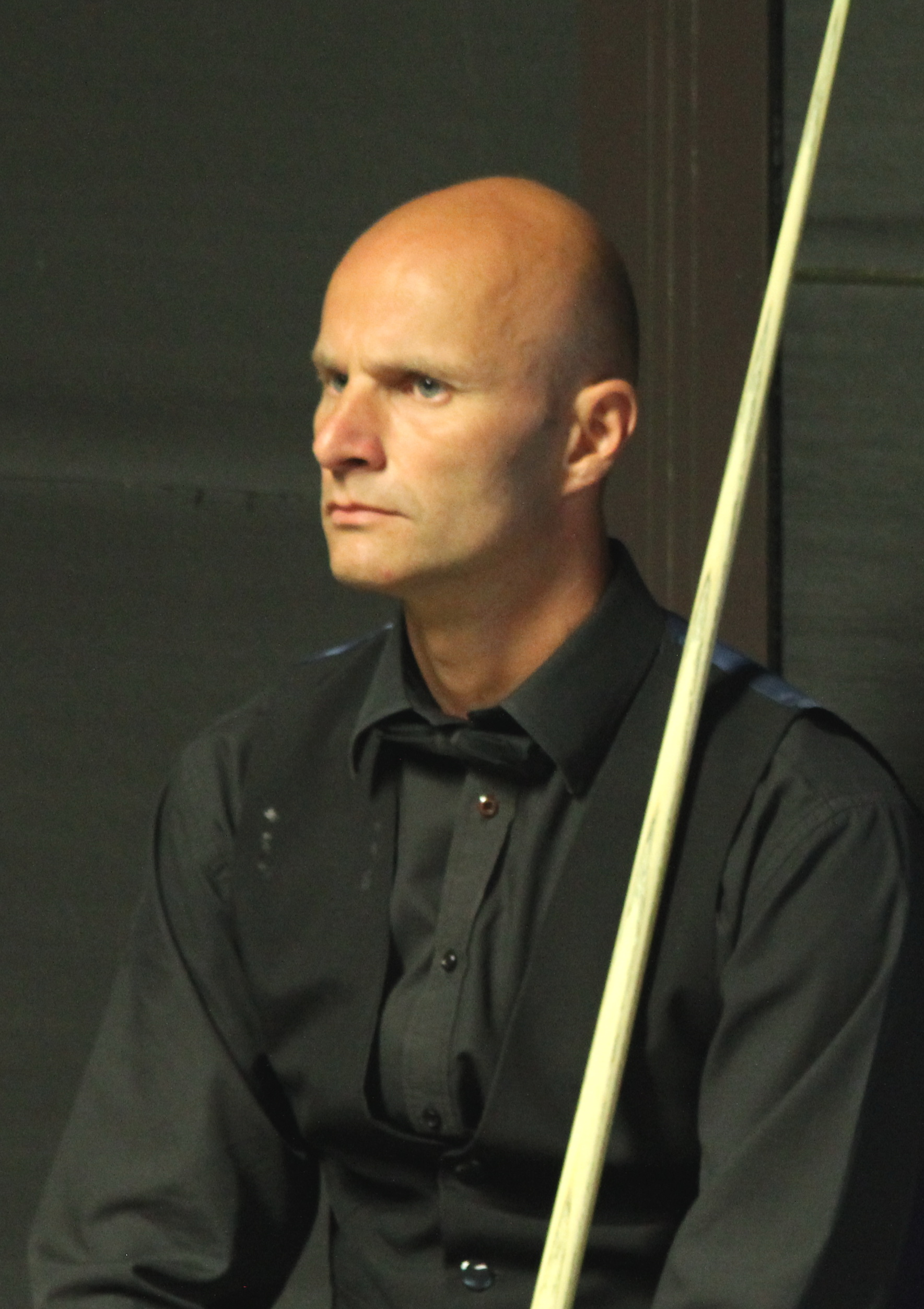
- Hicks at the 2016 Paul Hunter Classic

Personal information
- Nickname: The Cream of Devon
- Born: 10 August 1973 (age 53) Tavistock, Devon, England

Sport
- Country: England
- Sport: Snooker
- Professional: 1991–2013, 2019–2024
- Highest ranking: 17 (1995/1996)
- Maximum breaks: 1
- Century breaks: 167
- Best ranking finish: Semi-final (x6)

Andrew Hicks (born 10 August 1973) is an English retired professional snooker player. Nicknamed "The Cream of Devon", Hicks was a semi-finalist at both the World Snooker Championship and UK Championship in 1995, and the same stage at four other ranking tournaments. A Masters semi-finalist in 1996, he was ranked within the world's top 32 players between 1995 and 2000, and again from 2005 to 2007, but was relegated from the main tour in 2013. He regained a two-year tour card in 2019. He was relegated from the main tour at the end of the 2023–24 season.

== Career ==
Although a professional since 1991, Hicks first came to prominence in the 1995 World Championship, in which he reached the semi-finals, beating Steve Davis, Willie Thorne and Peter Ebdon along the way, but being blocked from the finals by Nigel Bond, 11–16. He has never reached a major final, but reached the semi-finals of the four BBC-screened events within 2 seasons – the 1994 Grand Prix, the 1995 UK Championship and the 1996 Masters (as a wild card).

He spent most of the second half of the 1990s close to the Top-16 elite section in the world rankings, peaking at no. 17 in the 1995/1996 season, and winning the 1997 Masters qualifier. He struggled in the early part of the 2000s, however, winning only two of eighty-three matches in 2003.

Later, he was only one frame loss away from being bumped out of the Top 64, rallying to defeat Craig Butler 10–9 in a close 2003 World Championship qualifier. He ended up ranked no. 62 for the 2003/2004 season. At this point, he had only qualified for the world championship once in six years, a 10–4 defeat to eventual winner Ronnie O'Sullivan in 2001. However, he returned to form after this. He reached the second round of the 2004 World Championship, beating Quinten Hann in a match memorable for a near-fight between the two players at the end, started by Hann in the middle of the match, when he said to Hicks: 'I've enjoyed the last three times I've beaten you'. At the end of the match, Hicks retorted that Hann was about to drop out of the Top 16 as a result of the loss. Hicks later admitted his delight at this. This marked the only time Hicks had won a match at the Crucible since 1995. He next gave Ronnie O'Sullivan a challenge in the second round, before ultimately losing, 11–13.

In 2004–05, Hicks made it to the quarter-finals of the British Open with a first-round victory over Ken Doherty.

Returning to the Top 32, in the following season he reached the last 32 in four of the six tournaments he entered, and retained his Top 32 status (marginally, at no. 31). He played in the 2006 World Championship, and lost to Steve Davis, 4–10, in the first round. Although slipping only a single position in the rankings (from no. 30 to no. 31) for 2006/2007, the year was not truly successful for him, and neither was 2006/2007, resulting in a drop down to the no. 41 position for 2007/2008 world rankings. After failing to qualify for the Welsh Open and China Open, he contemplated retiring if he could not retain a top-64 ranking.

He has compiled over 100 competitive centuries during his career, and has scored a maximum break at the UK Championship qualifiers in 2012. Despite winning only one key event, Hicks has career winnings of £562,560 (up to the start of the 2006/2007 season). He entered the 2018 Q School in a bid to win back his place on the snooker professional tour.

Hicks came through the third event of the 2019 Q School by winning six matches to earn a two-year card on the World Snooker Tour for the 2019/2020 and 2020–21 seasons.

== Personal life ==
He currently lives in Launceston, Cornwall and is the staff pro at Bell's Court Snooker Club in Falmouth. His wife Rachel was working there when they met; they married in 2005, and had their first child in 2006. He also plays golf, in a local society named after him.

== Performance and rankings timeline ==
Tournament	1991/ 92	1992/ 93	1993/ 94	1994/ 95	1995/ 96	1996/ 97	1997/ 98	1998/ 99	1999/ 00	2000/ 01	2001/ 02	2002/ 03	2003/ 04	2004/ 05	2005/ 06	2006/ 07	2007/ 08	2008/ 09	2009/ 10	2010/ 11	2011/ 12	2012/ 13	2014/ 15	2015/ 16	2016/ 17	2017/ 18	2018/ 19	2019/ 20	2020/ 21	2021/ 22	2022/ 23	2023/ 24
Ranking (Note: From the 2010/2011 season it shows the ranking at the beginning of the season.)	(Note: New players on the Main Tour don't have a ranking)	70	54	33	17	18	19	21	32	36	46	61	62	51	31	31	41	56	50	53	61	61	(Note: He was an amateur)						93	(Note: Players qualified One Year Ranking List started the season without ranking points)	67	57
Ranking tournaments
Championship League	Tournament Not Held															Non-Ranking Event													WD	RR	RR	RR
European Masters (Note: The event was called the European Open (1991/1992–1996/1997 and 2001/2002–2003/2004), the Irish Open (1998/1999) and the Malta Cup (2004/2005–2007/2008))	2R	SF	LQ	LQ	SF	2R	NH	LQ	Not Held		LQ	LQ	LQ	LQ	LQ	LQ	NR	Tournament Not Held							LQ	A	LQ	LQ	1R	1R	1R	2R
British Open	LQ	LQ	3R	LQ	2R	2R	2R	1R	2R	LQ	3R	LQ	2R	QF	Tournament Not Held															2R	LQ	1R
English Open	Tournament Not Held																								A	A	A	1R	2R	LQ	LQ	1R
Wuhan Open	Tournament Not Held																															LQ
Northern Ireland Open	Tournament Not Held																								A	A	A	1R	3R	1R	1R	LQ
International Championship	Tournament Not Held																					LQ	A	LQ	LQ	A	A	LQ	Not Held			LQ
UK Championship	1R	LQ	2R	1R	SF	2R	2R	2R	1R	LQ	LQ	LQ	1R	3R	1R	1R	LQ	LQ	LQ	LQ	LQ	LQ	A	1R	1R	A	A	1R	2R	QF	LQ	LQ
Shoot Out	Tournament Not Held																			Non-Ranking Event					SF	A	2R	1R	2R	1R	1R	2R
Scottish Open (Note: The event was called the International Open (1992/1993–1996/1997) and the Players Championship (2003/2004))	NH	2R	1R	2R	1R	2R	2R	1R	1R	LQ	LQ	LQ	LQ	Tournament Not Held								MR	Not Held		A	A	A	1R	2R	LQ	LQ	LQ
World Grand Prix	Tournament Not Held																						NR	DNQ	DNQ	DNQ	DNQ	DNQ	DNQ	1R	DNQ	DNQ
German Masters (Note: The event was called the German Open (1995/1996–1997/1998))	Tournament Not Held				LQ	2R	LQ	NR	Tournament Not Held											LQ	LQ	LQ	A	LQ	LQ	A	A	LQ	LQ	LQ	LQ	LQ
Welsh Open	LQ	LQ	2R	1R	1R	1R	3R	1R	2R	LQ	LQ	LQ	LQ	LQ	2R	1R	LQ	LQ	LQ	LQ	1R	LQ	A	1R	2R	A	A	1R	1R	LQ	2R	LQ
Players Championship (Note: The event was called the Players Tour Championship Grand Final (2010/2011–2012/2013 and 2014/2015–2015/2016))	Tournament Not Held																			DNQ	DNQ	DNQ	DNQ	DNQ	DNQ	DNQ	DNQ	DNQ	DNQ	DNQ	DNQ	DNQ
World Open (Note: The event was called the Grand Prix (1991/1992–2000/2001 and 2004/2005–2009/2010) and the LG Cup (2001/2002–2003/2004))	LQ	LQ	LQ	SF	2R	1R	1R	1R	3R	1R	LQ	LQ	LQ	2R	2R	RR	LQ	LQ	LQ	LQ	LQ	LQ	Not Held		LQ	A	A	LQ	Not Held			LQ
Tour Championship	Tournament Not Held																										DNQ	DNQ	DNQ	DNQ	DNQ	DNQ
World Championship	LQ	LQ	LQ	SF	LQ	1R	1R	LQ	LQ	1R	LQ	LQ	2R	1R	1R	1R	LQ	LQ	LQ	LQ	LQ	LQ	A	LQ	LQ	A	LQ	LQ	LQ	LQ	LQ	LQ
Non-ranking tournaments
The Masters	LQ	LQ	LQ	LQ	SF	LQ	WR	LQ	LQ	LQ	LQ	LQ	A	A	A	A	LQ	LQ	A	A	A	A	A	A	A	A	A	A	A	A	A	A
World Seniors Championship	A	Tournament Not Held																		A	A	A	LQ	A	A	A	NH	A	A	A	A	A
Former ranking tournaments
Strachan Open (Note: The event was called the Strachan Challenge (1992/1993–1993/1994))	2R	MR	NR	Tournament Not Held																												
Asian Classic (Note: The event was called the Dubai Classic (1991/1992–1994/1995) and the Thailand Classic (1995/1996))	1R	LQ	QF	LQ	1R	LQ	Tournament Not Held																									
Malta Grand Prix	Not Held			Non-Ranking Event					LQ	NR	Tournament Not Held																					
Thailand Masters (Note: The event was called the Asian Open (1991/1992–1992/1993) and the Thailand Open (1993/1994–1996/1997))	LQ	LQ	LQ	LQ	LQ	LQ	1R	LQ	1R	LQ	LQ	NR	Not Held			NR	Tournament Not Held															
Irish Masters	Non-Ranking Event											LQ	LQ	LQ	NH	NR	Tournament Not Held															
Northern Ireland Trophy	Tournament Not Held														NR	1R	LQ	LQ	Tournament Not Held													
Bahrain Championship	Tournament Not Held																	LQ	Tournament Not Held													
Wuxi Classic (Note: The event was called the Jiangsu Classic (2008/2009–2009/2010))	Tournament Not Held																	Non-Ranking Event				LQ	A	A	Tournament Not Held							
Australian Goldfields Open (Note: The event was called the Australian Open (1994/1995–1995/1996) and the Australian Masters (1995/1996))	Not Held			Non-Ranking		Tournament Not Held															LQ	LQ	A	A	Tournament Not Held							
Shanghai Masters	Tournament Not Held																LQ	2R	LQ	LQ	LQ	LQ	A	LQ	LQ	A	Non-Ranking		Not Held			NR
Paul Hunter Classic (Note: The event was called the Grand Prix Fürth (2004/2005) and the Fürth German Open (2005/2006–2006/2007))	Tournament Not Held													Pro-am Event						Minor-Ranking Event					1R	1R	A	NR	Tournament Not Held			
Indian Open	Tournament Not Held																						A	NH	LQ	A	3R	Tournament Not Held				
China Open (Note: The event was called the China International (1997/1998–1998/1999))	Tournament Not Held						NR	LQ	LQ	LQ	LQ	Not Held		LQ	LQ	LQ	LQ	LQ	LQ	LQ	LQ	LQ	A	LQ	1R	A	A	Tournament Not Held				
Riga Masters (Note: The event was called the Riga Open (2014/2015–2015/2016))	Tournament Not Held																						Minor-Rank		2R	A	A	LQ	Tournament Not Held			
China Championship	Tournament Not Held																								NR	A	A	LQ	Tournament Not Held			
WST Pro Series	Tournament Not Held																												RR	Not Held		
Turkish Masters	Tournament Not Held																													1R	Not Held	
Gibraltar Open	Tournament Not Held																							MR	A	3R	2R	1R	1R	2R	Not Held	
WST Classic	LQ	Tournament Not Held																													1R	NH
Former non-ranking tournaments
Pontins Professional	A	A	A	A	QF	F	SF	A	A	Tournament Not Held																						
Scottish Masters	A	A	A	A	LQ	A	A	A	A	A	A	A	Tournament Not Held																			
Masters Qualifying Event (Note: The event was also called the Benson & Hedges Championship (1990/1991–2002/2003))	1R	MR	1R	3R	1R	1R	W	3R	2R	SF	1R	3R	2R	NH	A	A	2R	2R	A	Tournament Not Held												
Shoot-Out	Tournament Not Held																			1R	1R	1R	A	A	Ranking Event							

Performance Table Legend
LQ	lost in the qualifying draw	#R	lost in the early rounds of the tournament (WR = Wildcard round, RR = Round robin)	QF	lost in the quarter-finals
SF	lost in the semi-finals	F	lost in the final	W	won the tournament
DNQ	did not qualify for the tournament	A	did not participate in the tournament	WD	withdrew from the tournament
DQ	disqualified from the tournament				

NH / Not Held	event was not held.
NR / Non-Ranking Event	event is/was no longer a ranking event.
R / Ranking Event	event is/was a ranking event.
MR / Minor-Ranking Event	means an event is/was a minor-ranking event.
PA / Pro-am Event	means an event is/was a pro-am event.

== Career finals ==
=== Non-ranking finals: 4 (1 title) ===
Outcome	No.	Year	Championship	Opponent in the final	Score
Runner-up	1.	1994	Strachan Open	(England) Anthony Hamilton	4–9
Runner-up	2.	1995	Scottish Masters Qualifying Event	(Scotland) Alan Burnett	2–5
Runner-up	3.	1997	Pontins Professional	(England) Martin Clark	7–9
Winner	1.	1997	Benson & Hedges Championship	(Wales) Paul Davies	9–6

=== Amateur finals: 2 (1 title) ===
Outcome	No.	Year	Championship	Opponent in the final	Score
Runner-up	1.	1989	British Under-16 Championship	(England) Ronnie O'Sullivan	1–3
Winner	1.	1991	British Under-19 Championship	(England) Bradley Jones	4–3
