= 1993 European Open (1993/1994) =

Snooker tournament held in December 1993

1993 Humo European Open
Tournament information
- Dates: 13–19 December 1993
- Venue: Arenahal
- City: Antwerp
- Country: Belgium
- Organisation: WPBSA
- Format: Ranking event
- Total prize fund: £150,000
- Winner's share: £27,000
- Highest break: Stephen Hendry (SCO) (142)

Final
- Champion: Stephen Hendry (SCO)
- Runner-up: Ronnie O'Sullivan (ENG)
- Score: 9–5

The 1993 European Open (officially the 1993 Humo European Open) was a professional ranking snooker tournament that took place between 13 and 19 December 1993 at the Arenahal in Antwerp, Belgium.

Stephen Hendry won the tournament, defeating Ronnie O'Sullivan 9–5 in the final. They had also contested the 1993 UK Championship final the previous month, in which O'Sullivan became the youngest winner of a ranking event.

== Main draw ==
Last 32; Best of 9 frames
(England) Steve Davis	5
(England) Danny Fowler	1
(Northern Ireland) Dennis Taylor	5
(England) Tony Knowles	1
(Republic of Ireland) Ken Doherty	5
(England) Darren Clarke	1
(England) Ronnie O'Sullivan	5
(England) Willie Thorne	4
(Scotland) John Higgins	5
(Wales) Terry Griffiths	2
(Malta) Tony Drago	5
(England) Neal Foulds	3
(England) Martin Clark	5
(Scotland) Chris Small	2
(England) Jimmy White	5
(Thailand) Noppadon Noppachorn	1
(England) John Parrott	5
(England) Anthony Hamilton	4
(Republic of Ireland) Fergal O'Brien	5
(England) Steve James	1
(England) David Roe	5
(New Zealand) Dene O'Kane	1
(Scotland) Alan McManus	5
(England) Gary Wilkinson	1
(Thailand) James Wattana	5
(Wales) Mark Bennett	1
(Wales) Darren Morgan	5
(Wales) Mark Williams	4
(England) Dean Reynolds	5
(England) Nigel Bond	2
(Scotland) Stephen Hendry	5
(England) Mick Price	0

Last 16; Best of 9 frames
(England) Steve Davis	5
(Northern Ireland) Dennis Taylor	1
(Republic of Ireland) Ken Doherty	2
(England) Ronnie O'Sullivan	5
(Scotland) John Higgins	5
(Malta) Tony Drago	2
(England) Martin Clark	3
(England) Jimmy White	5
(England) John Parrott	5
(Republic of Ireland) Fergal O'Brien	1
(England) David Roe	3
(Scotland) Alan McManus	5
(Thailand) James Wattana	5
(Wales) Darren Morgan	1
(England) Dean Reynolds	1
(Scotland) Stephen Hendry	5

Quarter-finals; Best of 9 frames
(England) Steve Davis	3
(England) Ronnie O'Sullivan	5
(Scotland) John Higgins	2
(England) Jimmy White	5
(England) John Parrott	5
(Scotland) Alan McManus	3
(Thailand) James Wattana	2
(Scotland) Stephen Hendry	5

Semi-finals; Best of 11 frames
(England) Ronnie O'Sullivan	6
(England) Jimmy White	3
(England) John Parrott	1
(Scotland) Stephen Hendry	6

Final; Best of 17 frames
(England) Ronnie O'Sullivan	5
(Scotland) Stephen Hendry	9
