= 1997 British Open =

Tournament information
- Dates: 27 March – 5 April 1997
- Venue: Plymouth Pavilions
- City: Plymouth
- Country: England
- Organisation: WPBSA
- Format: Ranking event
- Winner's share: £60,000

Final
- Champion: Mark Williams (WAL)
- Runner-up: Stephen Hendry (SCO)
- Score: 9–2

The 1997 British Open was a professional ranking snooker tournament, that was held from March to April 1997 at the Plymouth Pavilions, Plymouth, England.

Mark Williams won the tournament by defeating Stephen Hendry nine frames to two in the final. The defending champion, Nigel Bond, was defeated in the last 16 by Tony Drago.

== Main draw ==
Last 64; Best of 9 frames
(England) Nigel Bond	5
(England) Tony Knowles	0
(England) Andy Hicks	5
(England) Robert Milkins	2
(Malta) Tony Drago	5
(Wales) Wayne Jones	3
(England) Stephen Lee	2
(England) Ian McCulloch	5
(Wales) Mark Williams	5
(Northern Ireland) Jason Prince	4
(Scotland) Chris Small	4
(England) Nick Pearce	5
(England) John Parrott	3
(Scotland) Drew Henry	5
(England) Gary Wilkinson	5
(Northern Ireland) Terry Murphy	3
(Republic of Ireland) Ken Doherty	3
(Republic of Ireland) Michael Judge	5
(England) Rod Lawler	w/d
(England) Nick Walker	w/o
(England) Jimmy White	3
(Wales) Dominic Dale	5
(England) Steve James	5
(Wales) Tony Chappel	3
(Canada) Alain Robidoux	5
(England) Joe Perry	3
(England) Anthony Hamilton	5
(England) Lee Richardson	2
(England) Peter Ebdon	5
(Republic of Ireland) Fergal O'Brien	2
(Northern Ireland) Joe Swail	4
(England) Jimmy Michie	5
(Scotland) John Higgins	4
(England) Antony Bolsover	5
(England) Martin Clark	5
(Scotland) Graeme Dott	3
(England) Steve Davis	5
(Scotland) Marcus Campbell	1
(New Zealand) Dene O'Kane	2
(England) Mark Davis	5
(Wales) Darren Morgan	5
(England) Sean Storey	3
(England) Willie Thorne	5
(Pakistan) Shokat Ali	4
(Scotland) Alan McManus	5
(England) Tony Jones	2
(England) Dave Finbow	2
(England) Mark King	5
(England) Ronnie O'Sullivan	4
(Northern Ireland) Gerard Greene	5
(England) Mick Price	4
(England) Paul Sweeny	5
(England) Dave Harold	5
(Scotland) Billy Snaddon	4
(Northern Ireland) Dennis Taylor	5
(Republic of Ireland) Stephen Murphy	2
(Thailand) James Wattana	4
(Scotland) Paul McPhillips	5
(England) Jason Ferguson	5
(England) Steve Judd	2
(Scotland) Stephen Hendry	5
(England) Karl Broughton	3
(England) Neal Foulds	3
(England) Paul Wykes	5

Last 32; Best of 9 frames
(England) Nigel Bond	5
(England) Andy Hicks	4
(Malta) Tony Drago	5
(England) Ian McCulloch	0
(Wales) Mark Williams	5
(England) Nick Pearce	0
(Scotland) Drew Henry	1
(England) Gary Wilkinson	5
(Republic of Ireland) Michael Judge	5
(England) Nick Walker	4
(Wales) Dominic Dale	5
(England) Steve James	2
(Canada) Alain Robidoux	1
(England) Anthony Hamilton	5
(England) Peter Ebdon	5
(England) Jimmy Michie	2
(England) Antony Bolsover	3
(England) Martin Clark	5
(England) Steve Davis	5
(England) Mark Davis	0
(Wales) Darren Morgan	4
(England) Willie Thorne	5
(Scotland) Alan McManus	5
(England) Mark King	1
(Northern Ireland) Gerard Greene	2
(England) Paul Sweeny	5
(England) Dave Harold	5
(Northern Ireland) Dennis Taylor	2
(Scotland) Paul McPhillips	5
(England) Jason Ferguson	2
(Scotland) Stephen Hendry	5
(England) Paul Wykes	1

Last 16; Best of 9 frames
(England) Nigel Bond	1
(Malta) Tony Drago	5
(Wales) Mark Williams	5
(England) Gary Wilkinson	3
(Republic of Ireland) Michael Judge	5
(Wales) Dominic Dale	3
(England) Anthony Hamilton	1
(England) Peter Ebdon	5
(England) Martin Clark	4
(England) Steve Davis	5
(England) Willie Thorne	2
(Scotland) Alan McManus	5
(England) Paul Sweeny	4
(England) Dave Harold	5
(Scotland) Paul McPhillips	4
(Scotland) Stephen Hendry	5

Quarter-finals; Best of 9 frames
(Malta) Tony Drago	1
(Wales) Mark Williams	5
(Republic of Ireland) Michael Judge	3
(England) Peter Ebdon	5
(England) Steve Davis	5
(Scotland) Alan McManus	2
(England) Dave Harold	3
(Scotland) Stephen Hendry	5

Semi-finals; Best of 11 frames
(Wales) Mark Williams	6
(England) Peter Ebdon	5
(England) Steve Davis	2
(Scotland) Stephen Hendry	6

Final; Best of 17 frames
(Wales) Mark Williams	9
(Scotland) Stephen Hendry	2
