= 1990 European Grand Masters =

European Grand Masters
Tournament information
- Dates: 17–22 December 1990
- City: Monte Carlo
- Country: Monaco
- Organisation: Canal Plus
- Format: Non-ranking event
- Winner's share: £6,000

Final
- Champion: (England) Martin Clark
- Runner-up: (Wales) Ray Reardon
- Score: 4–2

The 1990 European Grand Masters was a professional non-ranking snooker tournament that took place in December 1990 in Monte Carlo, Monaco.

Martin Clark won the tournament, defeating 58 year old Ray Reardon 4–2 in the final. This was Reardon's last appearance in a professional final.

== Main draw ==
Quarter-finals; Best of 5 frames
(England) Martin Clark	3
(England) John Spencer	0
(Wales) Darren Morgan	3
(Canada) Cliff Thorburn	1
(Wales) Ray Reardon	3
(Thailand) James Wattana	1
(England) Nigel Bond	3
(Wales) Terry Griffiths	0

Semi-finals; Best of 5 frames
(England) Martin Clark	3
(Wales) Darren Morgan	2
(Wales) Ray Reardon	3
(England) Nigel Bond	2

Final; Best of 7 frames
(England) Martin Clark	4
(Wales) Ray Reardon	2
