= 1993 European Open (1992/1993) =

Snooker tournament held in February 1993

1993 Humo European Open
Tournament information
- Dates: 15–21 February 1993
- Venue: Arenahal
- City: Antwerp
- Country: Belgium
- Organisation: WPBSA
- Format: Ranking event
- Winner's share: £25,000

Final
- Champion: Steve Davis (ENG)
- Runner-up: Stephen Hendry (SCO)
- Score: 10–4

The 1993 European Open (officially the 1993 Humo European Open) was a professional ranking snooker tournament that took place in February 1993 at the Matchroom Schijnpoort in Antwerp, Belgium. Only the latter stages, from the last-16, were played in Antwerp.

Steve Davis won the tournament, defeating Stephen Hendry 10–4 in the final.

== Main draw ==
Last 64; Best of 9 frames
(England) Steve Davis	5
(England) Les Dodd	3
(England) Rod Lawler	5
(Republic of Ireland) Ken Doherty	4
(England) Steve James	5
(Northern Ireland) Jason Prince	2
(England) Dean Reynolds	5
(Scotland) Paul McPhillips	2
(England) Stephen Lee	5
(England) Tony Jones	3
(England) Martin Clark	5
(Canada) Bob Chaperon	2
(Wales) Mark Bennett	5
(England) Darren Hackeson	4
(Wales) Terry Griffiths	5
(England) Chris Scanlon	2
(England) Andy Hicks	5
(Australia) Eddie Charlton	4
(England) Gary Wilkinson	5
(England) Pat Horne	3
(Wales) Darren Morgan	5
(England) Jon Wright	3
(England) Darren Clarke	5
(New Zealand) Dene O'Kane	2
(England) Ronnie O'Sullivan	5
(England) Jimmy White	1
(England) Jason Weston	5
(South Africa) Silvino Francisco	4
(Wales) Doug Mountjoy	5
(England) Mark King	3
(England) Peter Ebdon	5
(Scotland) Alan McManus	3
(Scotland) Stephen Hendry	5
(Canada) Jim Wych	1
(England) Jamie Woodman	5
(South Africa) Peter Francisco	2
(Northern Ireland) Dennis Taylor	5
(England) Anthony Harris	3
(England) Mike Hallett	5
(Wales) Dominic Dale	3
(Northern Ireland) Joe Swail	5
(England) Neal Foulds	3
(England) Tony Knowles	5
(England) Karl Payne	2
(Malta) Tony Drago	5
(Canada) Cliff Thorburn	0
(England) Nigel Bond	5
(Northern Ireland) Alex Higgins	4
(England) Mick Price	5
(England) Willie Thorne	3
(England) Danny Fowler	5
(England) Brian Morgan	0
(England) Joe Johnson	5
(Wales) Anthony Davies	1
(England) John Parrott	5
(England) Jason Wallace	0
(England) Mark Johnston-Allen	5
(Australia) Steve Mifsud	4
(Canada) Alain Robidoux	5
(England) Tony Meo	4
(Wales) Mark Williams	5
(Thailand) James Wattana	3
(England) David Roe	5
(England) Jonathan Saunders	2

Last 32; Best of 9 frames
(England) Steve Davis	5
(England) Rod Lawler	2
(England) Steve James	5
(England) Dean Reynolds	0
(England) Stephen Lee	5
(England) Martin Clark	1
(Wales) Mark Bennett	5
(Wales) Terry Griffiths	2
(England) Andy Hicks	5
(England) Gary Wilkinson	4
(Wales) Darren Morgan	5
(England) Darren Clarke	4
(England) Ronnie O'Sullivan	5
(England) Jason Weston	1
(Wales) Doug Mountjoy	5
(England) Peter Ebdon	2
(Scotland) Stephen Hendry	5
(England) Jamie Woodman	2
(Northern Ireland) Dennis Taylor	5
(England) Mike Hallett	2
(Northern Ireland) Joe Swail	5
(England) Tony Knowles	1
(Malta) Tony Drago	5
(England) Nigel Bond	2
(England) Mick Price	5
(England) Danny Fowler	4
(England) Joe Johnson	5
(England) John Parrott	3
(England) Mark Johnston-Allen	5
(Canada) Alain Robidoux	4
(Wales) Mark Williams	5
(England) David Roe	2

Last 16; Best of 9 frames
(England) Steve Davis	5
(England) Steve James	2
(England) Stephen Lee	5
(Wales) Mark Bennett	4
(England) Andy Hicks	5
(Wales) Darren Morgan	0
(England) Ronnie O'Sullivan	5
(Wales) Doug Mountjoy	0
(Scotland) Stephen Hendry	5
(Northern Ireland) Dennis Taylor	4
(Northern Ireland) Joe Swail	5
(Malta) Tony Drago	3
(England) Mick Price	5
(England) Joe Johnson	2
(England) Mark Johnston-Allen	5
(Wales) Mark Williams	3

Quarter-finals; Best of 9 frames
(England) Steve Davis	5
(England) Stephen Lee	1
(England) Andy Hicks	5
(England) Ronnie O'Sullivan	4
(Scotland) Stephen Hendry	5
(Northern Ireland) Joe Swail	4
(England) Mick Price	5
(England) Mark Johnston-Allen	3

Semi-finals; Best of 11 frames
(England) Steve Davis	6
(England) Andy Hicks	1
(Scotland) Stephen Hendry	6
(England) Mick Price	3

Final; Best of 19 frames
(England) Steve Davis	10
(Scotland) Stephen Hendry	4
