= 1988 Kent Cup =

Kent Cup
Tournament information
- Dates: 6–9 April 1988
- Venue: Beijing Indoor Stadium
- City: Beijing
- Country: China
- Organisation: Framework and WPBSA
- Format: Non-ranking event
- Total prize fund: £120,000
- Winner's share: £35,000
- Highest break: 107, (England) John Parrott

Final
- Champion: (England) John Parrott
- Runner-up: (England) Martin Clark
- Score: 5–1

The 1988 Kent Cup was an invitational non-ranking snooker tournament held in Beijing from 6 to 9 April 1988.

The invited competitors were eight professionals, six Chinese and two Hong Kong amateur players. Nine hours of nationwide coverage in China led to viewing figures of 200 million. John Parrott won the tournament, defeating Martin Clark 5–1 in the final. Parrott compiled the highest break of the tournament, 107, in the final frame of his match against Jin Weheng.

== Main draw ==
Results of the tournament are shown below, with winning players indicated in bold.

**First round** Best of 3 frames
(England) **John Parrott**	**2**
(China) Jin Weheng	0
(Malta) **Tony Drago**	**2**
(Hong Kong) Gary Kwok	0
(England) **Dean Reynolds**	**2**
(China) Zhong Minwon	0
(Northern Ireland) **Alex Higgins**	**2**
(China) Wang Lin	0
(England) **Martin Clark**	**2**
(China) Sun Linbo	0
(Republic of Ireland) **Eugene Hughes**	**2**
(Hong Kong) Franky Chan	1
(England) **Tony Knowles**	**2**
(China) Li Yuanhai	0
(England) **Joe Johnson**	**2**
(China) Li Baoying	0

**Quarter-finals**; Best of 5 frames
(England) **John Parrott**	**3**
(Malta) Tony Drago	1
(England) **Dean Reynolds**	**3**
(Northern Ireland) Alex Higgins	2
(England) **Martin Clark**	**3**
(Republic of Ireland) Eugene Hughes	1
(England) **Tony Knowles**	**3**
(England) Joe Johnson	0

**Semi-finals**; Best of 7 frames
**(England) John Parrott**	**4**
(England) Dean Reynolds	2
(England) **Martin Clark**	**4**
(England) Tony Knowles	3

**Final**; Best of 9 frames
(England) **John Parrott**	**5**
(England) Martin Clark	1
