= 1997 Pontins Professional =

Tournament information
- Dates: 12–16 May 1997
- Venue: Pontin's
- City: Prestatyn
- Country: Wales
- Organisation: WPBSA
- Format: Non-Ranking event

Final
- Champion: (England) Martin Clark
- Runner-up: (England) Andy Hicks
- Score: 9–7

The 1997 Pontins Professional was the twenty-fourth edition of the professional invitational snooker tournament, which took place between 12 and 16 May 1997 at Pontin's in Prestatyn, Wales.

The tournament featured eight professional players. The quarter-final matches were contested over the best of 9 frames, the semi-final matches over the best of 11 frames, and the final over the best of 17 frames.

Martin Clark, who was a last-minute replacement for Darren Morgan, won the event for the first time, beating Andy Hicks 9–7 in the final.

== Main draw ==
Quarter-finals; Best of 9 frames
(England) Martin Clark	5
(England) Willie Thorne	2
(England) Neal Foulds	5
(Wales) Mark Williams	3
(England) Andy Hicks	5
(Northern Ireland) Joe Swail	2
(Republic of Ireland) Ken Doherty	5
(England) Mike Hallett	2

Semi-finals; Best of 11 frames
(England) Martin Clark	6
(England) Neal Foulds	4
(England) Andy Hicks	6
(Republic of Ireland) Ken Doherty	5

Final; Best of 17 frames
(England) Martin Clark	9
(England) Andy Hicks	7
