= 1998 Pontins Professional =

Tournament information
- Dates: 16–23 May 1998
- Venue: Pontin's
- City: Prestatyn
- Country: Wales
- Organisation: WPBSA
- Format: Non-Ranking event
- Highest break: Martin Clark (ENG) (111)

Final
- Champion: Mark Williams (WAL)
- Runner-up: Martin Clark (ENG)
- Score: 9–6

The 1998 Pontins Professional was the twenty-fifth edition of the professional invitational snooker tournament which took place in May 1998 in Prestatyn, Wales.

The tournament featured eight professional players. The quarter-final matches were contested over the best of 9 frames, the semi-finals best of eleven and the final best of seventeen.

Mark Williams won the event, beating Martin Clark 9–6 in the final. Clark had made the highest break of the tournament, 111, in his match against Mike Hallett.

== Main draw ==
Results of the tournament are shown below.

Quarter-finals; Best of 9 frames
Mark Williams (WAL)	5
Neal Foulds (ENG)	2
Ken Doherty (IRL)	5
Willie Thorne (ENG)	2
Martin Clark (ENG)	5
Mike Hallett (ENG)	3
Andy Hicks (ENG)	5
Darren Morgan (WAL)	4

Semi-finals; Best of 11 frames
Mark Williams (WAL)	6
Ken Doherty (IRL)	3
Martin Clark (ENG)	6
Andy Hicks (ENG)	2

Final; Best of 17 frames
Mark Williams (WAL)	9
Martin Clark (ENG)	6

== Final ==
Final: Best of 17 frames. Referee: unknown. Pontins, Prestatyn, Wales, 23 May 1998.
Mark Williams; Wales	9–6	Martin Clark; England
44–53, 72(62)–26, 100(100)–1, 1–73, 12–106(69), 68–45, 73–24, 73–0, 95(95)–0, 73–1, 95(57)–19, 42–80, 13–58, 71–75, 64–6
100	Highest break	69
1	Century breaks	0
4	50+ breaks	1

== Century breaks ==
Two century breaks were made during the tournament:

- 111 – Martin Clark
- 100 – Mark Williams
