= 1996 Masters (snooker) =

Professional non-ranking snooker tournament, Feb 1996

1996 Benson & Hedges Masters
Tournament information
- Dates: 4–11 February 1996
- Venue: Wembley Conference Centre
- City: London
- Country: England
- Organisation: WPBSA
- Format: Non-ranking event
- Winner's share: £125,000
- Highest break: Stephen Hendry (SCO) (144)

Final
- Champion: Stephen Hendry (SCO)
- Runner-up: Ronnie O'Sullivan (ENG)
- Score: 10–5

The 1996 Masters (officially the 1996 Benson & Hedges Masters) was a professional non-ranking snooker tournament that took place between 4 and 11 February 1996 at the Wembley Conference Centre in London, England. The last 16 and quarter-final rounds were extended from 9 to 11 frames while the final was extended from 17 to 19 frames, which has remained the match format ever since.

Stephen Hendry won his sixth Masters title by defeating defending champion Ronnie O'Sullivan 10–5 in the final. Hendry won £125,000 and £10,000 for the highest break of the tournament (144). During his quarter-final match Hendry also set the record of scoring 487 points without reply against Jimmy White.

== Field ==
Defending champion Ronnie O'Sullivan was the number 1 seed with World Champion Stephen Hendry seeded 2. Places were allocated to the top 16 players in the world rankings. Players seeded 15 and 16 played in the wild-card round against the winner of the qualifying event, Matthew Stevens (ranked 236), and Andy Hicks (ranked 17), who was the wild-card selection. Dave Harold, Andy Hicks and Matthew Stevens were making their debuts in the Masters.

== Wild-card round ==
In the preliminary round, the qualifier and wild-card players played the 15th and 16th seeds:

| Match | Date | | Score | |
|---|---|---|---|---|
| WC1 | Sunday 4 February | Terry Griffiths (WAL) (15) | 3–5 | Matthew Stevens (WAL) |
| WC2 | Monday 5 February | David Roe (ENG) (16) | 2–5 | Andy Hicks (ENG) |

== Main draw ==
Last 16; Best of 11 frames
1 | Ronnie O'Sullivan (ENG) | 6
12 | Nigel Bond (ENG) | 5
8 | Darren Morgan (WAL) | 6
10 | Peter Ebdon (ENG) | 5
5 | James Wattana (THA) | 4
Andy Hicks (ENG) | 6
4 | John Parrott (ENG) | 6
14 | Tony Drago (MLT) | 5
3 | Steve Davis (ENG) | 6
9 | Ken Doherty (IRL) | 0
6 | Alan McManus (SCO) | 6
Matthew Stevens (WAL) | 5
7 | Jimmy White (ENG) | 6
13 | Dave Harold (ENG) | 5
2 | Stephen Hendry (SCO) | 6
11 | John Higgins (SCO) | 4

Quarter-finals; Best of 11 frames
1 | (England) Ronnie O'Sullivan | 6
8 | (Wales) Darren Morgan | 4
(England) Andy Hicks | 6
4 | (England) John Parrott | 3
3 | (England) Steve Davis | 4
6 | (Scotland) Alan McManus | 6
7 | (England) Jimmy White | 0
2 | (Scotland) Stephen Hendry | 6

Semi-finals; Best of 11 frames
1 | (England) Ronnie O'Sullivan | 6
(England) Andy Hicks | 1
6 | (Scotland) Alan McManus | 4
2 | (Scotland) Stephen Hendry | 6

Final; Best of 19 frames
1 | (England) Ronnie O'Sullivan | 5
2 | (Scotland) Stephen Hendry | 10

== Final ==
Final: Best of 19 frames. Referee: Wembley Conference Centre, London, England, 11 February 1996.
| Stephen Hendry (2); Scotland | 10–5 | Ronnie O'Sullivan (1); England |
Afternoon: 108–0 (71), 12–73 (62), 69–90 (Hendry 54), 78–48 (77), 74–49, 61–17 (50), 71–5, 74–1 (62); Evening: 0–109 (109), 122–0 (87), 126–8 (125), 9–62 (61), 80–1 (80), 0–138 (106), 103–0 (97)
| 125 | Highest break | 109 |
| 1 | Century breaks | 2 |
| 9 | 50+ breaks | 4 |

== Qualifying ==
Matthew Stevens won the qualifying tournament, known as the 1995 Benson & Hedges Championship at the time.

== Century breaks ==
Total: 21

- 144, 134, 127, 125, 121, 105 – Stephen Hendry
- 131, 100 – Alan McManus
- 128, 109, 109, 106 – Ronnie O'Sullivan
- 125, 118, 103, 102 – Andy Hicks
- 117 – John Parrott
- 110 – Nigel Bond
- 104 – Steve Davis
- 101 – John Higgins
- 100 – Dave Harold

Andy Hicks's 125, 103 and 102 were scored in the wild-card round.
