= 1998 Masters (snooker) =

Professional non-ranking snooker tournament, Feb 1998

1998 Benson & Hedges Masters
Tournament information
- Dates: 1–8 February 1998
- Venue: Wembley Conference Centre
- City: London
- Country: England
- Organisation: WPBSA
- Format: Non-ranking event
- Total prize fund: £535,000
- Winner's share: £145,000
- Highest break: Andy Hicks (ENG) (142)

Final
- Champion: Mark Williams (WAL)
- Runner-up: Stephen Hendry (SCO)
- Score: 10–9

The 1998 Masters (officially the 1998 Benson & Hedges Masters) was a professional non-ranking snooker tournament that took place between 1 and 8 February 1998 at the Wembley Conference Centre in London, England.

The final frame of final between Mark Williams and Stephen Hendry turned into a re-spotted black for the first time since John Spencer beat Ray Reardon in the first final in 1975. Hendry had led 9–6, before Williams tied it to 9–9. Williams was then trailing 56–34 in the final frame, when he potted the brown and the remaining colours to tie the scores in the match, after Hendry missed the brown. They then played seven shots on the black in a match similar to the 1985 World Championship final between Dennis Taylor and Steve Davis. Hendry then missed a straight black across the nap in the middle pocket before Williams potted it on the top right pocket to claim his first Masters title.

== Field ==
Defending champion Steve Davis was the number 1 seed with World Champion Ken Doherty seeded 2. Places were allocated to the top 16 players in the world rankings. Players seeded 15 and 16 played in the wild-card round against the winner of the qualifying event, Andy Hicks (ranked 19), and Jimmy White (ranked 21), who was the wild-card selection. Anthony Hamilton and Stephen Lee were making their debuts in the Masters.

== Prize fund ==
The breakdown of prize money for this year is shown below:
Winner: £145,000
Runner-up: £75,000

High Break: £16,000

Total: £535,000

== Wild-card round ==
In the preliminary round, the wild-card players played the 15th and 16th seeds:

Match	Date		Score	
WC1	Sunday 1 February	Darren Morgan (WAL) (15)	5–4	Andy Hicks (ENG)
WC2	Monday 2 February	Stephen Lee (ENG) (16)	5–1	Jimmy White (ENG)

== Main draw ==
Last 16; Best of 11 frames
1	Steve Davis (ENG)	6
15	Darren Morgan (WAL)	2
8	Ronnie O'Sullivan (ENG)	6
10	Alain Robidoux (CAN)	5
5	Mark Williams (WAL)	6
11	Alan McManus (SCO)	4
4	John Higgins (SCO)	3
14	Anthony Hamilton (ENG)	6
3	Stephen Hendry (SCO)	6
16	Stephen Lee (ENG)	1
6	Peter Ebdon (ENG)	2
9	Nigel Bond (ENG)	6
7	John Parrott (ENG)	5
13	James Wattana (THA)	6
2	Ken Doherty (IRL)	6
12	Tony Drago (MLT)	4

Quarter-finals; Best of 11 frames
1	(England) Steve Davis	6
8	(England) Ronnie O'Sullivan	3
5	(Wales) Mark Williams	6
14	(England) Anthony Hamilton	3
3	(Scotland) Stephen Hendry	6
9	(England) Nigel Bond	3
13	(Thailand) James Wattana	1
2	(Republic of Ireland) Ken Doherty	6

Semi-finals; Best of 11 frames
1	(England) Steve Davis	3
5	(Wales) Mark Williams	6
3	(Scotland) Stephen Hendry	6
2	(Republic of Ireland) Ken Doherty	5

Final; Best of 19 frames
5	(Wales) Mark Williams	10
3	(Scotland) Stephen Hendry	9

== Final ==
Final: Best of 19 frames. Referee: Alan Chamberlain; Wembley Conference Centre, London, England, 8 February 1998
Mark Williams (5); Wales	10–9	Stephen Hendry (3); Scotland
Afternoon: 63–72, 68–34 (64), 45–79, 0–98 (98), 82–36, 0–121 (120), 6–70 (70), 80–66; Evening: 64–26, 104–1 (100), 0–106 (67), 87–2, 1–69, 44–73 (69), 0–78 (78), 72–60 (Hendry 54), 70–20 (69), 52–23, 63–56
100	Highest break	120
1	Century breaks	1
3	50+ breaks	7

== Qualifying ==
Andy Hicks won the qualifying tournament, known as the 1997 Benson & Hedges Championship at the time.

== Century breaks ==
Total: 20

- 142 – Andy Hicks
- 133, 113, 100 – James Wattana
- 133 – John Higgins
- 131, 122, 120, 110 – Stephen Hendry
- 126 – Alain Robidoux
- 124 – Ronnie O'Sullivan
- 119, 112 – Nigel Bond
- 114 – Stephen Lee
- 106 – Darren Morgan
- 104, 100 – Steve Davis
- 104 – Darren Morgan
- 100, 100 – Mark Williams

Andy Hicks, Stephen Lee and Darren Morgan scored their century breaks in the wild-card round.
