= World Open (snooker) =

Professional ranking snooker tournament

Tournament information
- Venue: Yushan Sport Centre
- Location: Yushan
- Country: China
- Established: 1982
- Organisation(s): World Snooker Tour; CBSA
- Format: Ranking event
- Total prize fund: £825,000
- Winner's share: £175,000
- Recent edition: 2026
- Current champion: Thepchaiya Un-Nooh (THA)

The World Open is a professional ranking snooker tournament. Throughout its history, the tournament has undergone numerous format revamps and name changes, with it being better known as the Grand Prix during most of the 1980s to 2000s. It is now held in Yushan, China, after relocations to Scotland and Hainan Island, where it replaces the China Open as the last ranking Chinese event before the World Championships every year.

Thepchaiya Un-Nooh is the reigning champion, having won his second title at the tournament.

== History ==
The tournament was created in 1982 as the Professional Players Tournament by the World Professional Billiards and Snooker Association, in order to provide another ranking event along with the International Open. Previously, only the World Championship carried ranking points. Ray Reardon beat Jimmy White 10–5 in the final to win the first prize of £5,000. Reardon became the oldest winner of a ranking event at the age of 50 years and 14 days. This record stood for 43 years, until Mark Williams won the 2025 Xi'an Grand Prix aged 50 years and 206 days.

In 1984 Rothmans started sponsoring the tournament, changing its name to the Grand Prix, and moved its venue to the Hexagon Theatre in Reading. The tournament has had various sponsors and venues since. Previous sponsors include LG Electronics, who took over in 2001 and changed the tournament's name to the LG Cup. After LG withdrew their sponsorship, the Grand Prix name was revived for 2004 and was sponsored by totesport, then by Royal London Watches between 2006 and 2008.

The tournament was played at the start of the snooker season at the Preston Guild Hall from 1998 to 2004, except moving once to Telford in 2000; the event was then moved to Aberdeen and Glasgow in Scotland during 2005 to 2010. On 9 January 2012, it was announced that the World Open would be held in the next five years in Haikou, Hainan Island, in China.

In November 2014, it was announced that the tournament would not be held that season after the contract with the promoter was not renewed and a new venue was not found in time. The event returned in 2016 and is now held in Yushan. Between 2020 and 2023, the event was not held due to the COVID-19 pandemic.

The 2024 season marked the return of the tournament after its closure during the Covid pandemic. In the final match, Judd Trump from England emerged victorious over the home player Ding Junhui with a score of 10–4, securing his reigning championship title.

=== Media coverage ===
The tournament is currently shown live on TNT Sports and Eurosport in Europe. Prior to the event moving to China, it had been aired extensively on the BBC, which had first covered the tournament in 1984. ITV televised the event in 2013. The first 2 tournaments 1982 and 1983 as the Professional Players Championship were not televised

== Format ==
During the Grand Prix era of the tournament, it has trialled several knockout formats. The tournament had a flatter structure than most tournaments back in the 1980s, with the top 32 players all coming in at the last-64 stage. Although now being the standard knockout format for ranking snooker events, there used to be only 16 players left when the players ranked 17–32 came in, and then the 16 winners of those matches faced the top 16; this structure is now only used for the World Championships.

These facts made it more common to see surprise results than in most other tournaments, with players such as Dominic Dale, Marco Fu, Euan Henderson and Dave Harold all surprise finalists at the time; players from outside the top 16 have reached the final roughly half the times the contest has been played. Many top 16 players were eliminated in the early stages of the contest; taking the 1996 event as an extreme case, thirteen of the top sixteen seeds failed to reach the quarter-final stages, and the semi-finals featured one match between two top-16 players (Mark Williams and John Parrott) and another between two unseeded players (Euan Henderson and Mark Bennett); with Bennett and Henderson respectively winning the first two quarter-final matches, a surprise finalist was guaranteed before the quarter-finals had been completed.

=== Round-robin era ===
The event was played in a brand-new round-robin format in 2006, more similar to association football and rugby tournaments than the knockout systems usually played in snooker. Players were split into groups (8 groups of 8 in qualifying, 8 groups of 6 in the final stages) and played every other player in their group once. The top 2 players progressed; the last 16 and onwards were played as a straight knockout.

This resulted in several surprise results. Little-known players such as Ben Woollaston, Jamie Jones and Issara Kachaiwong made it through qualifying, while stars such as Graeme Dott, Stephen Hendry and Shaun Murphy failed to clear their groups.

The format was slightly tweaked for 2007, after complaints (notably from Dennis Taylor) that the system was too random. Matches increased in length from best-of-5 to best-of-7, to give the better player more chance to win. The main tie-breaker for players level on wins was changed, with frame difference now taking precedence over results between the players who are level on points. Notably, under the 2007 format, 2006 runner-up Jamie Cope would have been eliminated in the groups, for he defeated third-placed Michael Holt but had an inferior frame difference.

The 2007 event saw fewer surprises, although 2006 world champion Graeme Dott, 1997 world champion Ken Doherty, defending champion Neil Robertson, seven-time world champion Stephen Hendry, six-time world champion Steve Davis, twice world champion Mark Williams and 2007 World Championship finalist Mark Selby were all eliminated in the groups. The format was not continued for 2008 due to dwindling ticket sales in the early rounds.

=== FA Cup-style draw and reversal ===
The 2008 event went back to a knockout format with no round-robin; however, the last 16 and beyond were played using an FA Cup-style draw, rather than automatically pitching higher-ranked players (or their conquerors) against lower-ranked players. Following Barry Hearn's takeover of the WPBSA, it was returned to its original format, where amateurs had to win 3 matches to qualify for the main draw.

== Winners ==
Year	Winner	Runner-up	Final score	Venue	City	Season
Professional Players Tournament (ranking, 1982–1983)
1982	Ray Reardon (WAL)	Jimmy White (ENG)	10–5	La Reserve & International Snooker Club	Birmingham, England	1982/83
1983	Tony Knowles (ENG)	Joe Johnson (ENG)	9–8	Redwood Lodge	Bristol, England	1983/84
Grand Prix (ranking, 1984–2000)
1984	Dennis Taylor (NIR)	Cliff Thorburn (CAN)	10–2	Hexagon Theatre	Reading, England	1984/85
1985	Steve Davis (ENG)	Dennis Taylor (NIR)	10–9	Hexagon Theatre	Reading, England	1985/86
1986	Jimmy White (ENG)	Rex Williams (ENG)	10–6	Hexagon Theatre	Reading, England	1986/87
1987	Stephen Hendry (SCO)	Dennis Taylor (NIR)	10–7	Hexagon Theatre	Reading, England	1987/88
1988	Steve Davis (ENG)	Alex Higgins (NIR)	10–6	Hexagon Theatre	Reading, England	1988/89
1989	Steve Davis (ENG)	Dean Reynolds (ENG)	10–0	Hexagon Theatre	Reading, England	1989/90
1990	Stephen Hendry (SCO)	Nigel Bond (ENG)	10–5	Hexagon Theatre	Reading, England	1990/91
1991	Stephen Hendry (SCO)	Steve Davis (ENG)	10–6	Hexagon Theatre	Reading, England	1991/92
1992	Jimmy White (ENG)	Ken Doherty (IRL)	10–9	Hexagon Theatre	Reading, England	1992/93
1993	Peter Ebdon (ENG)	Ken Doherty (IRL)	9–6	Hexagon Theatre	Reading, England	1993/94
1994	John Higgins (SCO)	Dave Harold (ENG)	9–6	Assembly Rooms	Derby, England	1994/95
1995	Stephen Hendry (SCO)	John Higgins (SCO)	9–5	Crowtree Centre	Sunderland, England	1995/96
1996	Mark Williams (WAL)	Euan Henderson (SCO)	9–5	Bournemouth International Centre	Bournemouth, England	1996/97
1997	Dominic Dale (WAL)	John Higgins (SCO)	9–6	Bournemouth International Centre	Bournemouth, England	1997/98
1998	Stephen Lee (ENG)	Marco Fu (HKG)	9–2	Guild Hall	Preston, England	1998/99
1999	John Higgins (SCO)	Mark Williams (WAL)	9–8	Guild Hall	Preston, England	1999/00
2000	Mark Williams (WAL)	Ronnie O'Sullivan (ENG)	9–5	Telford International Centre	Telford, England	2000/01
LG Cup (ranking, 2001–2003)
2001	Stephen Lee (ENG)	Peter Ebdon (ENG)	9–4	Guild Hall	Preston, England	2001/02
2002	Chris Small (SCO)	Alan McManus (SCO)	9–5	Guild Hall	Preston, England	2002/03
2003	Mark Williams (WAL)	John Higgins (SCO)	9–5	Guild Hall	Preston, England	2003/04
Grand Prix (ranking, 2004–2009)
2004	Ronnie O'Sullivan (ENG)	Ian McCulloch (ENG)	9–5	Guild Hall	Preston, England	2004/05
2005	John Higgins (SCO)	Ronnie O'Sullivan (ENG)	9–2	Aberdeen Exhibition and Conference Centre	Aberdeen, Scotland	2005/06
2006	Neil Robertson (AUS)	Jamie Cope (ENG)	9–5	Aberdeen Exhibition and Conference Centre	Aberdeen, Scotland	2006/07
2007	Marco Fu (HKG)	Ronnie O'Sullivan (ENG)	9–6	Aberdeen Exhibition and Conference Centre	Aberdeen, Scotland	2007/08
2008	John Higgins (SCO)	Ryan Day (WAL)	9–7	Scottish Exhibition and Conference Centre	Glasgow, Scotland	2008/09
2009	Neil Robertson (AUS)	Ding Junhui (CHN)	9–4	Kelvin Hall	Glasgow, Scotland	2009/10
World Open (ranking, 2010–present)
2010	Neil Robertson (AUS)	Ronnie O'Sullivan (ENG)	5–1	Scottish Exhibition and Conference Centre	Glasgow, Scotland	2010/11
2012	Mark Allen (NIR)	Stephen Lee (ENG)	10–1	Haikou Stadium	Haikou, China	2011/12
2013	Mark Allen (NIR)	Matthew Stevens (WAL)	10–4	Hainan International Convention And Exhibition Center	Haikou, China	2012/13
2014	Shaun Murphy (ENG)	Mark Selby (ENG)	10–6	Hainan International Convention And Exhibition Center	Haikou, China	2013/14
2016	Ali Carter (ENG)	Joe Perry (ENG)	10–8	Yushan No.1 Middle School	Yushan, China	2016/17
2017	Ding Junhui (CHN)	Kyren Wilson (ENG)	10–3	Yushan No.1 Middle School	Yushan, China	2017/18
2018	Mark Williams (WAL)	David Gilbert (ENG)	10–9	Yushan No.1 Middle School	Yushan, China	2018/19
2019	Judd Trump (ENG)	Thepchaiya Un-Nooh (THA)	10–5	Yushan Sport Centre	Yushan, China	2019/20
2020–2023	Cancelled due to the COVID-19 pandemic					
2024	Judd Trump (ENG)	Ding Junhui (CHN)	10–4	Yushan Sport Centre	Yushan, China	2023/24
2025	John Higgins (SCO)	Joe O'Connor (ENG)	10–6	Yushan Sport Centre	Yushan, China	2024/25
2026	Thepchaiya Un-Nooh (THA)	Ronnie O'Sullivan (ENG)	10–7	Yushan Sport Centre	Yushan, China	2025/26

== Records ==
The 1985 final between Steve Davis and Dennis Taylor is the longest one-day final in snooker history. It lasted 10 hours and 21 minutes.

In the 2005 final, John Higgins set two records:

- His century breaks in the seventh, eighth, ninth and tenth frames marked the first time a player had ever recorded centuries in four consecutive frames in a match during a ranking tournament.
- He scored 494 points without reply, the greatest number in any professional snooker tournament at that time. Currently Ronnie O'Sullivan holds the record with 556 points without reply against Ricky Walden in the 2014 Masters. Stuart Bingham now owns the unanswered points record in a ranking tournament, scoring 547 points without reply at the 2016 China Open against Sam Baird.

John Higgins is the only player to have won this tournament on five occasions. Stephen Hendry and Mark Williams are 2nd, with 4 wins apiece.

Until Mark Williams in the 2025 World Championship, this event had the unique distinction of having the two oldest ranking finalists in snooker history; the aforementioned Ray Reardon in his 1982 victory and 53 year old Rex Williams in his only ranking final in 1986, both times against Jimmy White.

In the 2026 edition, Ronnie O'Sullivan made the highest break in professional snooker history, a 16-red clearance of 153, during his quarter-final victory over Ryan Day. O'Sullivan's 153, which began with a free ball and included 14 blacks and two pinks, was only the second break exceeding 147 in professional competition, following the 148 by Jamie Burnett in the qualifying rounds of the 2004 UK Championship.

== See also ==
- Haining Open, a ranking event in the Huazhong area before the tournament moved to Yushan
- Hainan Classic
