= Mark Bennett (snooker player) =

Welsh snooker player

Personal information
- Born: 23 September 1963 (age 63) Blackwood, Monmouthshire

Sport
- Country: Wales
- Sport: Snooker
- Professional: 1986–2001
- Highest ranking: 24 (1993/1994)
- Best ranking finish: Semi-final (×1)

Mark Bennett (born 23 September 1963) is a Welsh former professional snooker player from Newport.

== Career ==
Bennett was born on 23 September 1963 in Blackwood, Monmouthshire. After winning the Welsh amateur title in 1985, he turned professional the following year by qualifying through the pro-ticket series. In his debut season, he won eleven of his eighteen matches, and qualified for the 1987 World Snooker Championship at the first attempt, coming through four rounds of qualifying and beating Bill Werbeniuk in the final round 10-8, having come back from 4-7 down, to make his debut at The Crucible. In the first round he lost 10-4 to former world champion Dennis Taylor. He finished the season with a world ranking of number 54.

He was ranked in the top 32 for four seasons between 1991 and 1995, reaching a high rank of 24 in 1993. Throughout his thirteen-year professional career he never reached a ranking final, but did reach several tournament quarter-finals and semi-finals. His last run to a ranking semi-final was in the 1996 Grand Prix. On the way he knocked out four seeded players, Peter Ebdon 5–3, Chris Small 5–0, Steve Davis 5–3 and Tony Drago 5–1, before losing 3–6 to Euan Henderson in the semi-finals after having led 2–0.

He qualified for the World Championship four times in total between 1987 and 1994, but never made it past the first round, coming closest in the 1990 event when he lost 9–10 to John Parrott. Bennett was runner-up in the 1991 Welsh Professional Championship after losing 2-9 in the final to Darren Morgan.

Bennett did not compete in professional snooker after 2001.
