= Mick Price (snooker player) =

English snooker player

Personal information
- Nickname: The Postman
- Born: 2 June 1966 (age 60) Nuneaton, Warwickshire, England

Sport
- Country: England
- Sport: Snooker
- Professional: 1988–2001
- Highest ranking: 21 (1995/1996)
- Best ranking finish: Semi-final (x1)

Michael Price (born 2 June 1966) is a retired English professional snooker player. He turned professional in 1988. He was Ronnie O'Sullivan's opponent when O'Sullivan scored the fastest 147 break in the game's history, at the 1997 World Championship.

== Career ==
From Nuneaton, he started playing snooker at the age of five years-old. He turned professional ahead of the 1988-1989 season having finished fourth in the pro-ticket series and winning a play-off 10-4 against David Greaves.

At the 1990 Benson & Hedges Satellite Championships, Price became only the third player to compile three consecutive century breaks in professional competition, when making contributions of 139, 137, 100 in beating former World number 2 Tony Knowles 5–4. Along with 1997, he also qualified for the World Championships in 1992 and 1996, reaching the second round in 1992 by beating Dennis Taylor 10–6 in the first round before losing in the second round, 10–13, to Alan McManus. In 1996, he lost to McManus again in the first round, 8–10. He peaked at #17 in the world rankings and remained in the top 32 until 1999. Price's best performance at a ranking event came at the 1993 European Open, where he beat Dave Harold, Willie Thorne, Joe Johnson and Mark Johnston-Allen to reach the semi-finals, where he lost 3–6 against reigning World Champion Stephen Hendry. He was Ronnie O'Sullivan's opponent when O'Sullivan scored the fastest 147 break in the game's history, at the 1997 World Championship.

He retired from Snooker in 2004.

== Personal life ==
Whilst playing snooker Price sported distinctive "Dennis Taylor" style spectacles. He later became a maths teacher, and continued to play local league snooker in the Midlands.
