= 1983–84 snooker season =

Details
- Duration: 4 July 1983 – 19 May 1984
- Tournaments: 23 (4 ranking events)

Triple Crown winners
- UK Championship: (Northern Ireland) Alex Higgins
- Masters: (England) Jimmy White
- World Championship: (England) Steve Davis

The 1983–84 snooker season was a series of snooker tournaments played between 4 July 1983 and 19 May 1984. The following table outlines the results for the ranking and the invitational events.

== New professional players ==
The World Professional Billiards and Snooker Association (WPBSA) received 39 applications for professional status for the start of the season. Its subcommittee for considering these (made up of Ray Reardon, John Virgo and Willie Thorne) recommended 17 for acceptance, and these were ratified by the WPBSA Board. The new professionals were Jim Bear, Bob Chaperon, Gino Rigitano, Joe Caggianello and Gerry Watson from Canada; Francois Ellis and Mike Hines from South Africa; George Ganim and James Giannaros from Australia; Paul Mifsud from Malta; Paddy Browne from Ireland; and Tony Jones, Steve Duggan, John Parrott, Neal Foulds, Bill Oliver and John Hargreaves from England.

== Calendar ==
Date (Note: Dates use the mm-dd date format.)			Rank	Tournament name	Venue	City	Winner	Runner-up	Score	Reference
07–04	07–15	AUS	NR	Australian Masters	Channel 10 Television Studios	Sydney	(Canada) Cliff Thorburn	(Canada) Bill Werbeniuk	7–3	
07–19	07–23	NZL	NR	New Zealand Masters		Auckland	(Canada) Bill Werbeniuk	(Wales) Doug Mountjoy	1–0	
08–05	08–07	HKG	NR	Hong Kong Masters	Queen Elizabeth Stadium	Hong Kong	(Wales) Doug Mountjoy	(Wales) Terry Griffiths	4–3	
08–11	08–13	THA	NR	Thailand Masters	Thai Nippon Stadium	Bangkok	(England) Tony Meo	(England) Steve Davis	2–1	
08–26	08–28	SCO	NR	Scottish Professional Championship	Glasgow University	Glasgow	(Scotland) Murdo MacLeod	(Scotland) Eddie Sinclair	11–9	
08-23	09-04	CAN	NR	Canadian Professional Championship	Canadian National Exhibition Stadium	Toronto	(Canada) Kirk Stevens	(Canada) Frank Jonik	9–8	
09–22	09–25	SCO	NR	Scottish Masters	Skean Dhu Hotel	Glasgow	(England) Steve Davis	(England) Tony Knowles	9–6	
10–01	10–09	ENG	WR	International Open	Eldon Square Recreation Centre	Newcastle	(England) Steve Davis	(Canada) Cliff Thorburn	9–4	
10-10	10–21	ENG	WR	Professional Players Tournament	Redwood Lodge	Bristol	(England) Tony Knowles	(England) Joe Johnson	9–8	
10–22	10–30	ENG	TE	World Team Classic	Hexagon Theatre	Reading	England	Wales	4–2	
11–18	12–04	ENG	NR	UK Championship	Guild Hall	Preston	(Northern Ireland) Alex Higgins	(England) Steve Davis	16–15	
12–09	12–18	ENG	TE	World Doubles Championship	Derngate Centre	Northampton	(England) Steve Davis (England) Tony Meo	(England) Tony Knowles (England) Jimmy White	10–2	
12–28	12–30	ENG	NR	Pot Black (Note: Event was played and recorded in December 1983, but broadcast in the summer of 1984.)	BBC Studios	Birmingham	(Wales) Terry Griffiths	(England) John Spencer	2–1	
01–08	01–15	ENG	WR	The Classic	Spectrum Arena	Warrington	(England) Steve Davis	(England) Tony Meo	9–8	
01–22	01–29	ENG	NR	The Masters	Wembley Conference Centre	London	(England) Jimmy White	(Wales) Terry Griffiths	9–5	
02–21	02–24	ENG	NR	Tolly Cobbold Classic	Corn Exchange	Ipswich	(England) Steve Davis	(England) Tony Knowles	8–2	
02–27	03–04	ENG	NR	International Masters	Assembly Rooms	Derby	(England) Steve Davis	(England) Dave Martin	(Note: Final was decided on a three-man round robin basis, the third player was John Dunning.)	
03–07	03–11	WAL	NR	Welsh Professional Championship	Ebbw Vale Leisure Centre	Ebbw Vale	(Wales) Doug Mountjoy	(Wales) Cliff Wilson	9–3	
03–27	04–01	IRL	NR	Irish Masters	Goff's	Kill	(England) Steve Davis	(Wales) Terry Griffiths	9–1	
11-11	04–14	GBR	NR	Professional Snooker League			(England) John Virgo	(Northern Ireland) Dennis Taylor	(Note: No play-off was held and the title was decided on league table only. Kirk Stevens withdrew after seven matches.)	
04–21	05–07	ENG	WR	World Snooker Championship	Crucible Theatre	Sheffield	(England) Steve Davis	(England) Jimmy White	18–16	
05–12	05–19	WAL	NR	Pontins Professional	Pontins	Prestatyn	(England) Willie Thorne	(England) John Spencer	9–7	

WR = World ranking event
NR = Non-ranking event
TE = Team event

== Official rankings ==
The top 16 of the world rankings, these players automatically played in the final rounds of the world ranking events and were invited for the Masters.

No.	Ch.	Name
1	▲	(England) Steve Davis
2	▼	(Wales) Ray Reardon
3	Steady	(Canada) Cliff Thorburn
4	▲	(England) Tony Knowles
5	▼	(Northern Ireland) Alex Higgins
6	▼	(Australia) Eddie Charlton
7	▼	(Canada) Kirk Stevens
8	▲	(Canada) Bill Werbeniuk
9	▲	(Wales) Terry Griffiths
10	▼	(England) David Taylor
11	▼	(England) Jimmy White
12	▼	(Wales) Doug Mountjoy
13	Steady	(Northern Ireland) Dennis Taylor
14	▲	(England) John Virgo
15	▲	(England) Tony Meo
16	▼	(England) John Spencer
