= List of snooker ranking tournaments =

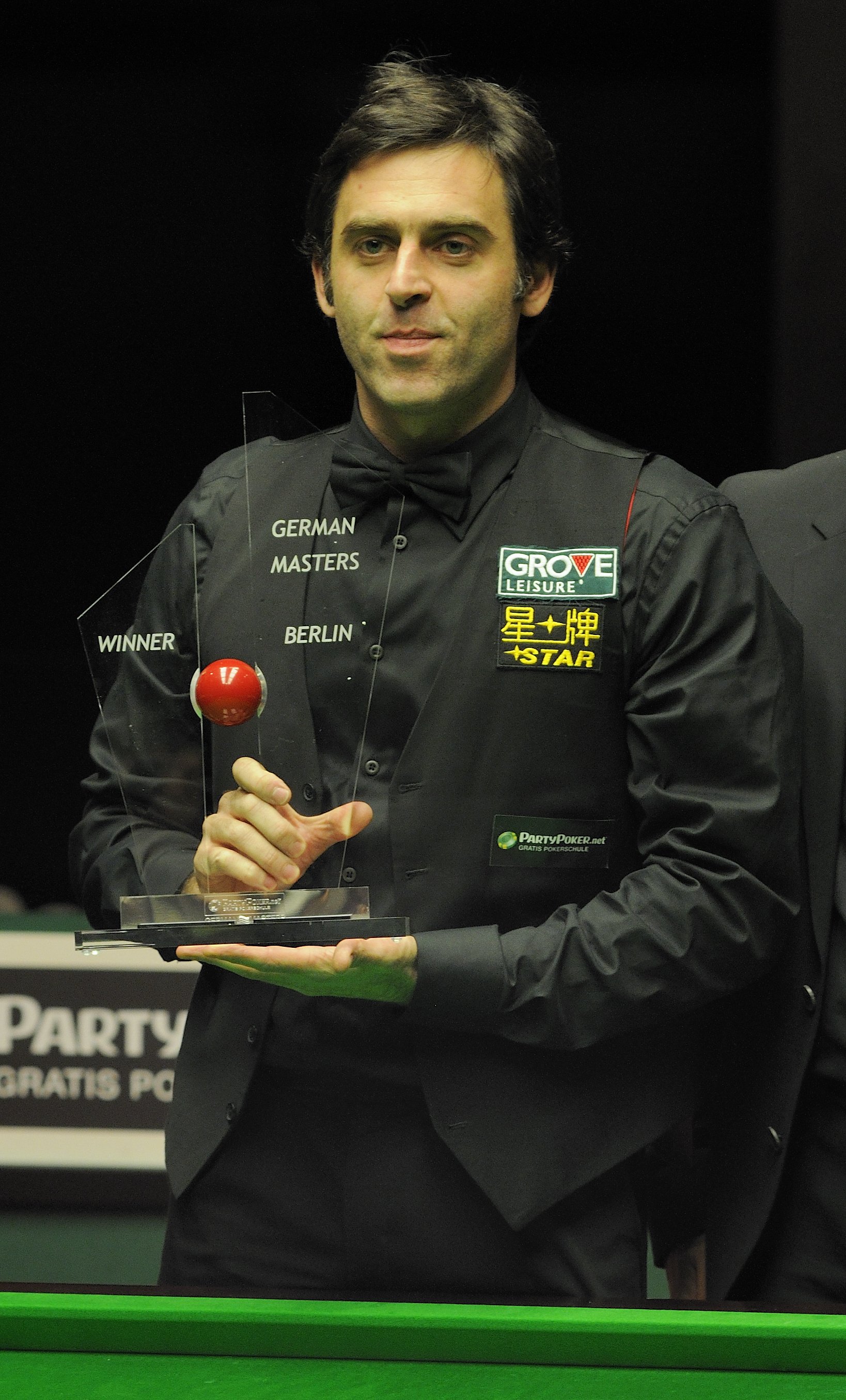
Ronnie O'Sullivan (pictured holding the 2012 German Masters trophy) is the most prolific champion, having won 41 ranking tournaments.

In snooker, some tournaments are used for the official system of ranking professional players, which determines automatic qualification and the seedings for the events that belong to the World Snooker Tour. These tournaments also allow players to gain more ranking points based on the results. They are regarded as "ranking tournaments" or "ranking events".

The World Professional Billiards and Snooker Association, the governing body for professional snooker, first published official world rankings for players on the main tour for the 1976–77 season. Before this, the defending champion was seeded first and the previous year's runner-up second for each tournament. For the 1976–77 season, players' performances in the previous three World Snooker Championships (1974, 1975, and 1976) contributed to their ranking points total. This has led to the 1974 edition of the World Championship being regarded as the first ranking tournament in history. Ray Reardon defeated Graham Miles 22–12 in the final.

The same rudimentary system was used for a number of years, until the rankings for the 1983–84 season included performances in two additional tournaments—the International Open and the Professional Players Tournament—held during the 1982–83 season. The UK Championship became a ranking tournament in 1984. The calendar of the 2025–26 season included as many as 18 ranking tournaments. In the 1992–93 season, and from 2010–11 to 2015–16, a number of events were classified as "minor-ranking tournaments". These contributed to the world rankings but to a lesser degree than the standard ranking tournaments. From 2010 to 2016, the minor-ranking events were all part of the Players Tour Championship, regarded as a "second-tier" tour. The tournaments belonging to that system, discontinued in 2016, are not included in this list.

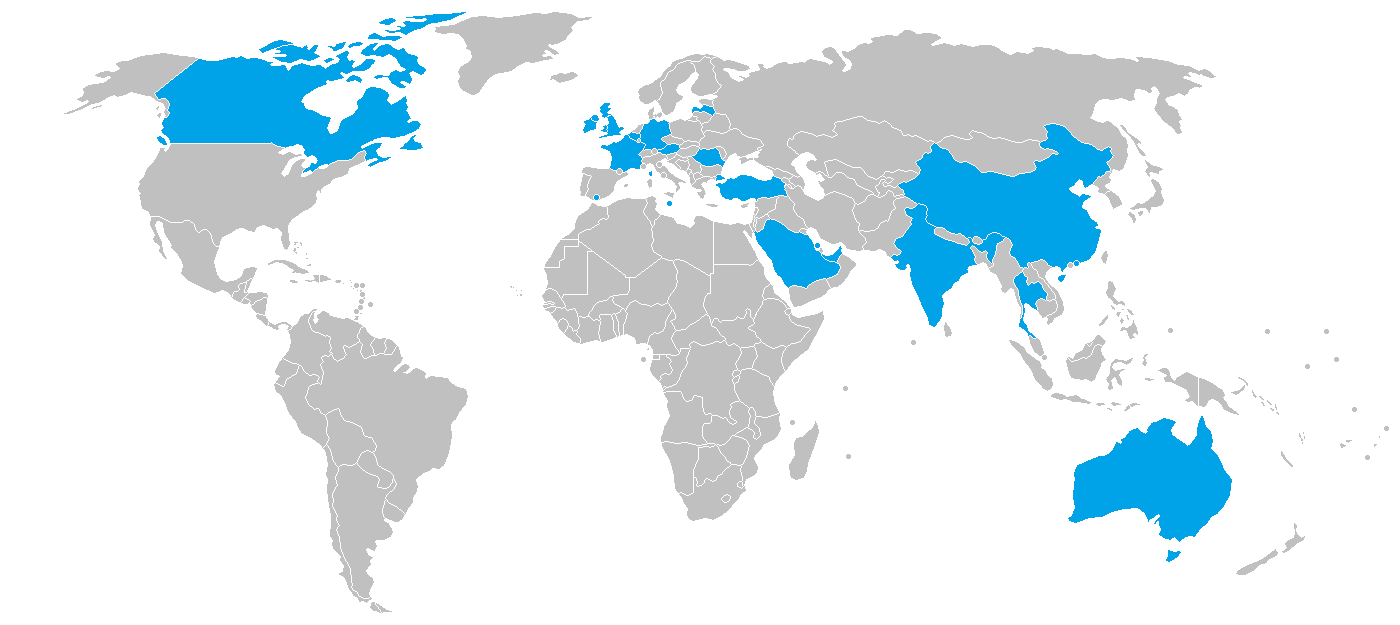
Several countries (highlighted in blue in the map) have hosted a snooker ranking tournament.

As of the 2026 International Championship, a total of 468 ranking tournaments have been held. A total of 83 players have claimed at least a ranking tournament trophy. Ronnie O'Sullivan is the most prolific champion, having won 41 ranking titles, followed by Stephen Hendry with 36 and John Higgins with 33. Several countries have hosted at least one ranking tournament: Australia, Austria, Bahrain, Belgium, Canada, China, England, France, Germany, Gibraltar, Hong Kong, India, Ireland, Latvia, Malta, Netherlands, Northern Ireland, Romania, Saudi Arabia, Scotland, Thailand, Turkey, United Arab Emirates (Dubai), and Wales.

== Tournaments ==
List of snooker ranking tournaments
#	End date	Tournament	Location	Winner	Age	Runner-up	Age	Score	Ref.
1	25 Apr 1974	World Snooker Championship	Manchester	Ray Reardon (1)	41 years, 199 days	Graham Miles (1)	32 years, 349 days	22‍–‍12	
2	1 May 1975	World Snooker Championship	Melbourne	Ray Reardon (2)	42 years, 205 days	Eddie Charlton (1)	45 years, 182 days	31‍–‍30	
3	23 Apr 1976	World Snooker Championship	Manchester	Ray Reardon (3)	43 years, 198 days	Alex Higgins (1)	27 years, 36 days	27‍–‍16	
4	30 Apr 1977	World Snooker Championship	Sheffield	John Spencer (1)	41 years, 224 days	Cliff Thorburn (1)	29 years, 104 days	25‍–‍21	
5	29 Apr 1978	World Snooker Championship	Sheffield	Ray Reardon (4)	45 years, 203 days	Perrie Mans (1)	37 years, 196 days	25‍–‍18	
6	28 Apr 1979	World Snooker Championship	Sheffield	Terry Griffiths (1)	31 years, 194 days	Dennis Taylor (1)	30 years, 99 days	24‍–‍16	
7	5 May 1980	World Snooker Championship	Sheffield	Cliff Thorburn (1)	32 years, 110 days	Alex Higgins (2)	31 years, 48 days	18‍–‍16	
8	20 Apr 1981	World Snooker Championship	Sheffield	Steve Davis (1)	23 years, 241 days	Doug Mountjoy (1)	38 years, 316 days	18‍–‍12	
9	16 May 1982	World Snooker Championship	Sheffield	Alex Higgins (1)	33 years, 59 days	Ray Reardon (1)	49 years, 220 days	18‍–‍15	
10	10 Oct 1982	International Open	Derby	Tony Knowles (1)	27 years, 119 days	David Taylor (1)	39 years, 73 days	9‍–‍6	
11	22 Oct 1982	Professional Players Tournament	Birmingham	Ray Reardon (5)	50 years, 14 days	Jimmy White (1)	20 years, 173 days	10‍–‍5	
12	2 May 1983	World Snooker Championship	Sheffield	Steve Davis (2)	25 years, 253 days	Cliff Thorburn (2)	35 years, 106 days	18‍–‍6	
13	9 Oct 1983	International Open	Newcastle	Steve Davis (3)	26 years, 48 days	Cliff Thorburn (3)	35 years, 266 days	9‍–‍4	
14	21 Oct 1983	Professional Players Tournament	Bristol	Tony Knowles (2)	28 years, 130 days	Joe Johnson (1)	31 years, 84 days	9‍–‍8	
15	15 Jan 1984	Classic	Warrington	Steve Davis (4)	26 years, 146 days	Tony Meo (1)	24 years, 103 days	9‍–‍8	
16	7 May 1984	World Snooker Championship	Sheffield	Steve Davis (5)	26 years, 259 days	Jimmy White (2)	22 years, 5 days	18‍–‍16	
17	7 Oct 1984	International Open	Newcastle	Steve Davis (6)	27 years, 46 days	Tony Knowles (1)	29 years, 116 days	9‍–‍2	
18	28 Oct 1984	Grand Prix	Reading	Dennis Taylor (1)	35 years, 283 days	Cliff Thorburn (4)	36 years, 286 days	10‍–‍2	
19	2 Dec 1984	UK Championship	Preston	Steve Davis (7)	27 years, 102 days	Alex Higgins (3)	35 years, 259 days	16‍–‍8	
20	13 Jan 1985	Classic	Warrington	Willie Thorne (1)	30 years, 315 days	Cliff Thorburn (5)	36 years, 363 days	13‍–‍8	
21	3 Mar 1985	British Open	Derby	Silvino Francisco (1)	38 years, 304 days	Kirk Stevens (1)	26 years, 198 days	12‍–‍9	
22	28 Apr 1985	World Snooker Championship	Sheffield	Dennis Taylor (2)	36 years, 99 days	Steve Davis (1)	27 years, 249 days	18‍–‍17	
23	6 Oct 1985	Matchroom Trophy	Stoke-on-Trent	Cliff Thorburn (2)	37 years, 263 days	Jimmy White (3)	23 years, 157 days	12‍–‍10	
24	27 Oct 1985	Grand Prix	Reading	Steve Davis (8)	28 years, 66 days	Dennis Taylor (2)	36 years, 281 days	10‍–‍9	
25	1 Dec 1985	UK Championship	Preston	Steve Davis (9)	28 years, 101 days	Willie Thorne (1)	31 years, 272 days	16‍–‍14	
26	12 Jan 1986	Classic	Warrington	Jimmy White (1)	23 years, 255 days	Cliff Thorburn (6)	37 years, 361 days	13‍–‍12	
27	2 Mar 1986	British Open	Derby	Steve Davis (10)	28 years, 192 days	Willie Thorne (2)	31 years, 363 days	12‍–‍7	
28	5 May 1986	World Snooker Championship	Sheffield	Joe Johnson (1)	33 years, 280 days	Steve Davis (2)	28 years, 256 days	18‍–‍12	
29	5 Oct 1986	International Open	Stoke-on-Trent	Neal Foulds (1)	23 years, 84 days	Cliff Thorburn (7)	38 years, 262 days	12‍–‍9	
30	26 Oct 1986	Grand Prix	Reading	Jimmy White (2)	24 years, 177 days	Rex Williams (1)	53 years, 98 days	10‍–‍6	
31	30 Nov 1986	UK Championship	Preston	Steve Davis (11)	29 years, 100 days	Neal Foulds (1)	23 years, 140 days	16‍–‍7	
32	11 Jan 1987	Classic	Blackpool	Steve Davis (12)	29 years, 142 days	Jimmy White (4)	24 years, 254 days	13‍–‍12	
33	1 Mar 1987	British Open	Derby	Jimmy White (3)	24 years, 303 days	Neal Foulds (2)	23 years, 231 days	13‍–‍9	
34	4 May 1987	World Snooker Championship	Sheffield	Steve Davis (13)	29 years, 255 days	Joe Johnson (2)	34 years, 279 days	18‍–‍14	
35	4 Oct 1987	International Open	Stoke-on-Trent	Steve Davis (14)	30 years, 43 days	Cliff Thorburn (8)	39 years, 261 days	12‍–‍5	
36	25 Oct 1987	Grand Prix	Reading	Stephen Hendry (1)	18 years, 285 days	Dennis Taylor (3)	38 years, 279 days	10‍–‍7	
37	29 Nov 1987	UK Championship	Preston	Steve Davis (15)	30 years, 99 days	Jimmy White (5)	25 years, 211 days	16‍–‍14	
38	10 Jan 1988	Classic	Blackpool	Steve Davis (16)	30 years, 141 days	John Parrott (1)	23 years, 244 days	13‍–‍11	
39	6 Mar 1988	British Open	Derby	Stephen Hendry (2)	19 years, 53 days	Mike Hallett (1)	28 years, 244 days	13‍–‍2	
40	2 May 1988	World Snooker Championship	Sheffield	Steve Davis (17)	30 years, 254 days	Terry Griffiths (1)	40 years, 199 days	18‍–‍11	
41	11 Sep 1988	International Open	Stoke-on-Trent	Steve Davis (18)	31 years, 20 days	Jimmy White (6)	26 years, 132 days	12‍–‍6	
42	23 Oct 1988	Grand Prix	Reading	Steve Davis (19)	31 years, 62 days	Alex Higgins (4)	39 years, 219 days	10‍–‍6	
43	5 Nov 1988	Canadian Masters	Toronto	Jimmy White (4)	26 years, 187 days	Steve Davis (3)	31 years, 75 days	9‍–‍4	
44	27 Nov 1988	UK Championship	Preston	Doug Mountjoy (1)	46 years, 172 days	Stephen Hendry (1)	19 years, 319 days	16‍–‍12	
45	15 Jan 1989	Classic	Blackpool	Doug Mountjoy (2)	46 years, 221 days	Wayne Jones (1)	29 years, 22 days	13‍–‍11	
46	11 Feb 1989	European Open	Deauville	John Parrott (1)	24 years, 276 days	Terry Griffiths (2)	41 years, 118 days	9‍–‍8	
47	5 Mar 1989	British Open	Derby	Tony Meo (1)	29 years, 152 days	Dean Reynolds (1)	26 years, 53 days	13‍–‍6	
48	1 May 1989	World Snooker Championship	Sheffield	Steve Davis (20)	31 years, 252 days	John Parrott (2)	24 years, 355 days	18‍–‍3	
49	13 Aug 1989	Hong Kong Open	Hong Kong	Mike Hallett (1)	30 years, 38 days	Dene O'Kane (1)	26 years, 170 days	9‍–‍8	
50	27 Aug 1989	Asian Open	Bangkok	Stephen Hendry (3)	20 years, 226 days	James Wattana (1)	19 years, 222 days	9‍–‍6	
51	30 Sep 1989	International Open	Stoke-on-Trent	Steve Davis (21)	32 years, 39 days	Stephen Hendry (2)	20 years, 260 days	9‍–‍4	
52	22 Oct 1989	Grand Prix	Reading	Steve Davis (22)	32 years, 61 days	Dean Reynolds (2)	26 years, 284 days	10‍–‍0	
53	3 Nov 1989	Dubai Classic	Dubai	Stephen Hendry (4)	20 years, 294 days	Doug Mountjoy (2)	47 years, 148 days	9‍–‍2	
54	3 Dec 1989	UK Championship	Preston	Stephen Hendry (5)	20 years, 324 days	Steve Davis (4)	32 years, 103 days	16‍–‍12	
55	13 Jan 1990	Classic	Blackpool	Steve James (1)	28 years, 256 days	Warren King (1)	34 years, 287 days	10‍–‍6	
56	3 Mar 1990	British Open	Derby	Bob Chaperon (1)	31 years, 289 days	Alex Higgins (5)	40 years, 350 days	10‍–‍8	
57	16 Mar 1990	European Open	Lyon	John Parrott (2)	25 years, 309 days	Stephen Hendry (3)	21 years, 62 days	10‍–‍6	
58	29 Apr 1990	World Snooker Championship	Sheffield	Stephen Hendry (6)	21 years, 106 days	Jimmy White (7)	27 years, 362 days	18‍–‍12	
59	21 Oct 1990	Grand Prix	Reading	Stephen Hendry (7)	21 years, 281 days	Nigel Bond (1)	24 years, 340 days	10‍–‍5	
60	3 Nov 1990	Asian Open	Guangzhou	Stephen Hendry (8)	21 years, 294 days	Dennis Taylor (4)	41 years, 288 days	9‍–‍3	
61	11 Nov 1990	Dubai Classic	Dubai	Stephen Hendry (9)	21 years, 302 days	Steve Davis (5)	33 years, 81 days	9‍–‍1	
62	2 Dec 1990	UK Championship	Preston	Stephen Hendry (10)	21 years, 323 days	Steve Davis (6)	33 years, 102 days	16‍–‍15	
63	12 Jan 1991	Classic	Bournemouth	Jimmy White (5)	28 years, 255 days	Stephen Hendry (4)	21 years, 364 days	10‍–‍4	
64	2 Mar 1991	British Open	Derby	Stephen Hendry (11)	22 years, 48 days	Gary Wilkinson (1)	24 years, 329 days	10‍–‍9	
65	16 Mar 1991	European Open	Rotterdam	Tony Jones (1)	30 years, 335 days	Mark Johnston-Allen (1)	22 years, 78 days	9‍–‍7	
66	6 May 1991	World Snooker Championship	Sheffield	John Parrott (3)	26 years, 360 days	Jimmy White (8)	29 years, 4 days	18‍–‍11	
67	11 Oct 1991	Dubai Classic	Dubai	John Parrott (4)	27 years, 153 days	Tony Knowles (2)	36 years, 120 days	9‍–‍3	
68	27 Oct 1991	Grand Prix	Reading	Stephen Hendry (12)	22 years, 287 days	Steve Davis (7)	34 years, 66 days	10‍–‍6	
69	1 Dec 1991	UK Championship	Preston	John Parrott (5)	27 years, 204 days	Jimmy White (9)	29 years, 213 days	16‍–‍13	
70	11 Jan 1992	Classic	Bournemouth	Steve Davis (23)	34 years, 142 days	Stephen Hendry (5)	22 years, 363 days	9‍–‍8	
71	19 Jan 1992	Asian Open	Bangkok	Steve Davis (24)	34 years, 150 days	Alan McManus (1)	20 years, 363 days	9‍–‍3	
72	16 Feb 1992	Welsh Open	Newport	Stephen Hendry (13)	23 years, 34 days	Darren Morgan (1)	25 years, 289 days	9‍–‍3	
73	29 Feb 1992	British Open	Derby	Jimmy White (6)	29 years, 303 days	James Wattana (2)	22 years, 43 days	10‍–‍7	
74	7 Mar 1992	Strachan Open	Bristol	James Wattana (1)	22 years, 50 days	John Parrott (3)	27 years, 301 days	9‍–‍5	
75	14 Mar 1992	European Open	Tongeren	Jimmy White (7)	29 years, 317 days	Mark Johnston-Allen (2)	23 years, 77 days	9‍–‍3	
76	4 May 1992	World Snooker Championship	Sheffield	Stephen Hendry (14)	23 years, 112 days	Jimmy White (10)	30 years, 2 days	18‍–‍14	
77	9 Oct 1992	Dubai Classic	Dubai	John Parrott (6)	28 years, 151 days	Stephen Hendry (6)	23 years, 270 days	9‍–‍8	
78	25 Oct 1992	Grand Prix	Reading	Jimmy White (8)	30 years, 176 days	Ken Doherty (1)	23 years, 38 days	10‍–‍9	
79	29 Nov 1992	UK Championship	Preston	Jimmy White (9)	30 years, 211 days	John Parrott (4)	28 years, 202 days	16‍–‍9	
80	31 Jan 1993	Welsh Open	Newport	Ken Doherty (1)	23 years, 136 days	Alan McManus (2)	22 years, 10 days	9‍–‍7	
81	21 Feb 1993	European Open (1992–1993 season)	Antwerp	Steve Davis (25)	35 years, 183 days	Stephen Hendry (7)	24 years, 39 days	10‍–‍4	
82	6 Mar 1993	British Open	Derby	Steve Davis (26)	35 years, 196 days	James Wattana (3)	23 years, 48 days	10‍–‍2	
83	20 Mar 1993	Asian Open	Bangkok	Dave Harold (1)	26 years, 101 days	Darren Morgan (2)	26 years, 321 days	9‍–‍3	
84	11 Apr 1993	International Open	Plymouth	Stephen Hendry (15)	24 years, 88 days	Steve Davis (8)	35 years, 232 days	10‍–‍6	
85	3 May 1993	World Snooker Championship	Sheffield	Stephen Hendry (16)	24 years, 110 days	Jimmy White (11)	31 years, 1 day	18‍–‍5	
86	10 Oct 1993	Dubai Classic	Dubai	Stephen Hendry (17)	24 years, 270 days	Steve Davis (9)	36 years, 49 days	9‍–‍3	
87	31 Oct 1993	Grand Prix	Reading	Peter Ebdon (1)	23 years, 65 days	Ken Doherty (2)	24 years, 44 days	9‍–‍6	
88	28 Nov 1993	UK Championship	Preston	Ronnie O'Sullivan (1)	17 years, 358 days	Stephen Hendry (8)	24 years, 319 days	10‍–‍6	
89	19 Dec 1993	European Open (1993–1994 season)	Antwerp	Stephen Hendry (18)	24 years, 340 days	Ronnie O'Sullivan (1)	18 years, 14 days	9‍–‍5	
90	5 Feb 1994	Welsh Open	Newport	Steve Davis (27)	36 years, 167 days	Alan McManus (3)	23 years, 15 days	9‍–‍6	
91	19 Feb 1994	International Open	Bournemouth	John Parrott (7)	29 years, 284 days	James Wattana (4)	24 years, 33 days	9‍–‍5	
92	16 Mar 1994	Thailand Open	Bangkok	James Wattana (2)	24 years, 58 days	Steve Davis (10)	36 years, 206 days	9‍–‍7	
93	7 Apr 1994	British Open	Plymouth	Ronnie O'Sullivan (2)	18 years, 123 days	James Wattana (5)	24 years, 80 days	9‍–‍4	
94	2 May 1994	World Snooker Championship	Sheffield	Stephen Hendry (19)	25 years, 109 days	Jimmy White (12)	32 years, 0 days	18‍–‍17	
95	7 Oct 1994	Dubai Classic	Dubai	Alan McManus (1)	23 years, 259 days	Peter Ebdon (1)	24 years, 41 days	9‍–‍6	
96	23 Oct 1994	Grand Prix	Derby	John Higgins (1)	19 years, 158 days	Dave Harold (1)	27 years, 318 days	9‍–‍6	
97	27 Nov 1994	UK Championship	Preston	Stephen Hendry (20)	25 years, 318 days	Ken Doherty (3)	25 years, 71 days	10‍–‍5	
98	17 Dec 1994	European Open	Antwerp	Stephen Hendry (21)	25 years, 338 days	John Parrott (5)	30 years, 220 days	9‍–‍3	
99	29 Jan 1995	Welsh Open	Newport	Steve Davis (28)	37 years, 160 days	John Higgins (1)	19 years, 256 days	9‍–‍3	
100	19 Feb 1995	International Open	Bournemouth	John Higgins (2)	19 years, 277 days	Steve Davis (11)	37 years, 181 days	9‍–‍5	
101	18 Mar 1995	Thailand Open	Bangkok	James Wattana (3)	25 years, 60 days	Ronnie O'Sullivan (2)	19 years, 103 days	9‍–‍6	
102	9 Apr 1995	British Open	Plymouth	John Higgins (3)	19 years, 326 days	Ronnie O'Sullivan (3)	19 years, 125 days	9‍–‍6	
103	30 Apr 1995	World Snooker Championship	Sheffield	Stephen Hendry (22)	26 years, 107 days	Nigel Bond (2)	29 years, 166 days	18‍–‍9	
104	7 Oct 1995	Thailand Classic	Bangkok	John Parrott (8)	31 years, 149 days	Nigel Bond (3)	29 years, 326 days	9‍–‍6	
105	29 Oct 1995	Grand Prix	Sunderland	Stephen Hendry (23)	26 years, 289 days	John Higgins (2)	20 years, 164 days	9‍–‍5	
106	3 Dec 1995	UK Championship	Preston	Stephen Hendry (24)	26 years, 324 days	Peter Ebdon (2)	25 years, 98 days	10‍–‍3	
107	10 Dec 1995	German Open	Frankfurt	John Higgins (4)	20 years, 206 days	Ken Doherty (4)	26 years, 84 days	9‍–‍3	
108	3 Feb 1996	Welsh Open	Newport	Mark Williams (1)	20 years, 319 days	John Parrott (6)	31 years, 268 days	9‍–‍3	
109	24 Feb 1996	International Open	Swindon	John Higgins (5)	20 years, 282 days	Rod Lawler (1)	24 years, 227 days	9‍–‍3	
110	3 Mar 1996	European Open	Valletta	John Parrott (9)	31 years, 297 days	Peter Ebdon (3)	25 years, 189 days	9‍–‍7	
111	17 Mar 1996	Thailand Open	Bangkok	Alan McManus (2)	25 years, 56 days	Ken Doherty (5)	26 years, 182 days	9‍–‍8	
112	8 Apr 1996	British Open	Plymouth	Nigel Bond (1)	30 years, 145 days	John Higgins (3)	20 years, 326 days	9‍–‍8	
113	6 May 1996	World Snooker Championship	Sheffield	Stephen Hendry (25)	27 years, 114 days	Peter Ebdon (4)	25 years, 253 days	18‍–‍12	
114	15 Sep 1996	Asian Classic	Bangkok	Ronnie O'Sullivan (3)	20 years, 285 days	Brian Morgan (1)	28 years, 61 days	9‍–‍8	
115	27 Oct 1996	Grand Prix	Bournemouth	Mark Williams (2)	21 years, 220 days	Euan Henderson (1)	29 years, 119 days	9‍–‍5	
116	1 Dec 1996	UK Championship	Preston	Stephen Hendry (26)	27 years, 323 days	John Higgins (4)	21 years, 197 days	10‍–‍9	
117	15 Dec 1996	German Open	Osnabrück	Ronnie O'Sullivan (4)	21 years, 10 days	Alain Robidoux (1)	36 years, 143 days	9‍–‍7	
118	1 Feb 1997	Welsh Open	Newport	Stephen Hendry (27)	28 years, 19 days	Mark King (1)	22 years, 310 days	9‍–‍2	
119	22 Feb 1997	International Open	Aberdeen	Stephen Hendry (28)	28 years, 40 days	Tony Drago (1)	31 years, 153 days	9‍–‍1	
120	2 Mar 1997	European Open	Valletta	John Higgins (6)	21 years, 288 days	John Parrott (7)	32 years, 295 days	9‍–‍5	
121	16 Mar 1997	Thailand Open	Bangkok	Peter Ebdon (2)	26 years, 201 days	Nigel Bond (4)	31 years, 121 days	9‍–‍7	
122	5 Apr 1997	British Open	Plymouth	Mark Williams (3)	22 years, 15 days	Stephen Hendry (9)	28 years, 82 days	9‍–‍2	
123	5 May 1997	World Snooker Championship	Sheffield	Ken Doherty (2)	27 years, 230 days	Stephen Hendry (10)	28 years, 112 days	18‍–‍12	
124	26 Oct 1997	Grand Prix	Bournemouth	Dominic Dale (1)	25 years, 301 days	John Higgins (5)	22 years, 161 days	9‍–‍6	
125	30 Nov 1997	UK Championship	Preston	Ronnie O'Sullivan (5)	21 years, 360 days	Stephen Hendry (11)	28 years, 321 days	10‍–‍6	
126	14 Dec 1997	German Open	Bingen	John Higgins (7)	22 years, 210 days	John Parrott (8)	33 years, 217 days	9‍–‍4	
127	25 Jan 1998	Welsh Open	Newport	Paul Hunter (1)	19 years, 103 days	John Higgins (6)	22 years, 252 days	9‍–‍5	
128	22 Feb 1998	Scottish Open	Aberdeen	Ronnie O'Sullivan (6)	22 years, 79 days	John Higgins (7)	22 years, 280 days	9‍–‍5	
129	15 Mar 1998	Thailand Masters	Bangkok	Stephen Hendry (29)	29 years, 61 days	John Parrott (9)	33 years, 308 days	9‍–‍6	
130	12 Apr 1998	British Open	Plymouth	John Higgins (8)	22 years, 329 days	Stephen Hendry (12)	29 years, 89 days	9‍–‍8	
131	4 May 1998	World Snooker Championship	Sheffield	John Higgins (9)	22 years, 351 days	Ken Doherty (6)	28 years, 229 days	18‍–‍12	
132	25 Oct 1998	Grand Prix	Preston	Stephen Lee (1)	24 years, 13 days	Marco Fu (1)	20 years, 290 days	9‍–‍2	
133	29 Nov 1998	UK Championship	Bournemouth	John Higgins (10)	23 years, 195 days	Matthew Stevens (1)	21 years, 79 days	10‍–‍6	
134	20 Dec 1998	Irish Open	Tallaght	Mark Williams (4)	23 years, 274 days	Alan McManus (4)	27 years, 333 days	9‍–‍4	
135	31 Jan 1999	Welsh Open	Cardiff	Mark Williams (5)	23 years, 316 days	Stephen Hendry (13)	30 years, 18 days	9‍–‍8	
136	21 Feb 1999	Scottish Open	Aberdeen	Stephen Hendry (30)	30 years, 39 days	Graeme Dott (1)	21 years, 285 days	9‍–‍1	
137	7 Mar 1999	Thailand Masters	Bangkok	Mark Williams (6)	23 years, 351 days	Alan McManus (5)	28 years, 45 days	9‍–‍7	
138	14 Mar 1999	China International	Shanghai	John Higgins (11)	23 years, 300 days	Billy Snaddon (1)	29 years, 250 days	9‍–‍3	
139	11 Apr 1999	British Open (1998–1999 season)	Plymouth	Fergal O'Brien (1)	27 years, 34 days	Anthony Hamilton (1)	27 years, 286 days	9‍–‍7	
140	3 May 1999	World Snooker Championship	Sheffield	Stephen Hendry (31)	30 years, 110 days	Mark Williams (1)	24 years, 43 days	18‍–‍11	
141	19 Sep 1999	British Open (1999–2000 season)	Plymouth	Stephen Hendry (32)	30 years, 249 days	Peter Ebdon (5)	29 years, 23 days	9‍–‍5	
142	24 Oct 1999	Grand Prix	Preston	John Higgins (12)	24 years, 159 days	Mark Williams (2)	24 years, 217 days	9‍–‍8	
143	28 Nov 1999	UK Championship	Bournemouth	Mark Williams (7)	24 years, 252 days	Matthew Stevens (2)	22 years, 78 days	10‍–‍8	
144	19 Dec 1999	China Open	Shanghai	Ronnie O'Sullivan (7)	24 years, 14 days	Stephen Lee (1)	25 years, 68 days	9‍–‍2	
145	30 Jan 2000	Welsh Open	Cardiff	John Higgins (13)	24 years, 257 days	Stephen Lee (2)	25 years, 110 days	9‍–‍8	
146	27 Feb 2000	Malta Grand Prix	Valletta	Ken Doherty (3)	30 years, 163 days	Mark Williams (3)	24 years, 343 days	9‍–‍3	
147	11 Mar 2000	Thailand Masters	Bangkok	Mark Williams (8)	24 years, 356 days	Stephen Hendry (14)	31 years, 58 days	9‍–‍5	
148	9 Apr 2000	Scottish Open	Aberdeen	Ronnie O'Sullivan (8)	24 years, 126 days	Mark Williams (4)	25 years, 19 days	9‍–‍1	
149	1 May 2000	World Snooker Championship	Sheffield	Mark Williams (9)	25 years, 41 days	Matthew Stevens (3)	22 years, 233 days	18‍–‍16	
150	8 Oct 2000	British Open	Plymouth	Peter Ebdon (3)	30 years, 42 days	Jimmy White (13)	38 years, 159 days	9‍–‍6	
151	22 Oct 2000	Grand Prix	Telford	Mark Williams (10)	25 years, 215 days	Ronnie O'Sullivan (4)	24 years, 322 days	9‍–‍5	
152	3 Dec 2000	UK Championship	Bournemouth	John Higgins (14)	25 years, 199 days	Mark Williams (5)	25 years, 257 days	10‍–‍4	
153	17 Dec 2000	China Open	Shenzhen	Ronnie O'Sullivan (9)	25 years, 12 days	Mark Williams (6)	25 years, 271 days	9‍–‍3	
154	28 Jan 2001	Welsh Open	Cardiff	Ken Doherty (4)	31 years, 133 days	Paul Hunter (1)	22 years, 106 days	9‍–‍2	
155	17 Mar 2001	Thailand Masters	Bangkok	Ken Doherty (5)	31 years, 181 days	Stephen Hendry (15)	32 years, 63 days	9‍–‍3	
156	15 Apr 2001	Scottish Open	Aberdeen	Peter Ebdon (4)	30 years, 231 days	Ken Doherty (7)	31 years, 210 days	9‍–‍7	
157	7 May 2001	World Snooker Championship	Sheffield	Ronnie O'Sullivan (10)	25 years, 153 days	John Higgins (8)	25 years, 354 days	18‍–‍14	
158	7 Oct 2001	British Open	Newcastle	John Higgins (15)	26 years, 142 days	Graeme Dott (2)	24 years, 148 days	9‍–‍6	
159	21 Oct 2001	LG Cup	Preston	Stephen Lee (2)	27 years, 9 days	Peter Ebdon (6)	31 years, 55 days	9‍–‍4	
160	1 Dec 2001	European Open	Valletta	Stephen Hendry (33)	32 years, 322 days	Joe Perry (1)	27 years, 110 days	9‍–‍2	
161	16 Dec 2001	UK Championship	York	Ronnie O'Sullivan (11)	26 years, 11 days	Ken Doherty (8)	32 years, 90 days	10‍–‍1	
162	27 Jan 2002	Welsh Open	Cardiff	Paul Hunter (2)	23 years, 105 days	Ken Doherty (9)	32 years, 132 days	9‍–‍7	
163	3 Mar 2002	China Open	Shanghai	Mark Williams (11)	26 years, 347 days	Anthony Hamilton (2)	30 years, 247 days	9‍–‍8	
164	10 Mar 2002	Thailand Masters	Bangkok	Mark Williams (12)	26 years, 354 days	Stephen Lee (3)	27 years, 149 days	9‍–‍4	
165	14 Apr 2002	Scottish Open	Aberdeen	Stephen Lee (3)	27 years, 184 days	David Gray (1)	23 years, 64 days	9‍–‍2	
166	6 May 2002	World Snooker Championship	Sheffield	Peter Ebdon (5)	31 years, 252 days	Stephen Hendry (16)	33 years, 113 days	18‍–‍17	
167	13 Oct 2002	LG Cup	Preston	Chris Small (1)	29 years, 17 days	Alan McManus (6)	31 years, 265 days	9‍–‍5	
168	17 Nov 2002	British Open	Telford	Paul Hunter (3)	24 years, 34 days	Ian McCulloch (1)	31 years, 112 days	9‍–‍4	
169	15 Dec 2002	UK Championship	York	Mark Williams (13)	27 years, 269 days	Ken Doherty (10)	33 years, 89 days	10‍–‍9	
170	26 Jan 2003	Welsh Open	Cardiff	Stephen Hendry (34)	34 years, 13 days	Mark Williams (7)	27 years, 311 days	9‍–‍5	
171	16 Mar 2003	European Open	Torquay	Ronnie O'Sullivan (12)	27 years, 101 days	Stephen Hendry (17)	34 years, 62 days	9‍–‍6	
172	30 Mar 2003	Irish Masters	Dublin	Ronnie O'Sullivan (13)	27 years, 115 days	John Higgins (9)	27 years, 316 days	10‍–‍9	
173	13 Apr 2003	Scottish Open	Edinburgh	David Gray (1)	24 years, 63 days	Mark Selby (1)	19 years, 298 days	9‍–‍7	
174	5 May 2003	World Snooker Championship	Sheffield	Mark Williams (14)	28 years, 45 days	Ken Doherty (11)	33 years, 230 days	18‍–‍16	
175	12 Oct 2003	LG Cup	Preston	Mark Williams (15)	28 years, 205 days	John Higgins (10)	28 years, 147 days	9‍–‍5	
176	16 Nov 2003	British Open	Brighton	Stephen Hendry (35)	34 years, 307 days	Ronnie O'Sullivan (5)	27 years, 346 days	9‍–‍6	
177	30 Nov 2003	UK Championship	York	Matthew Stevens (1)	26 years, 80 days	Stephen Hendry (18)	34 years, 321 days	10‍–‍8	
178	25 Jan 2004	Welsh Open	Cardiff	Ronnie O'Sullivan (14)	28 years, 51 days	Steve Davis (12)	46 years, 156 days	9‍–‍8	
179	6 Mar 2004	European Open	St Julian's	Stephen Maguire (1)	22 years, 359 days	Jimmy White (14)	41 years, 309 days	9‍–‍3	
180	28 Mar 2004	Irish Masters	Dublin	Peter Ebdon (6)	33 years, 214 days	Mark King (2)	30 years, 0 days	10‍–‍7	
181	11 Apr 2004	Players Championship	Glasgow	Jimmy White (10)	41 years, 345 days	Paul Hunter (2)	25 years, 180 days	9‍–‍7	
182	3 May 2004	World Snooker Championship	Sheffield	Ronnie O'Sullivan (15)	28 years, 150 days	Graeme Dott (3)	26 years, 357 days	18‍–‍8	
183	10 Oct 2004	Grand Prix	Preston	Ronnie O'Sullivan (16)	28 years, 310 days	Ian McCulloch (2)	33 years, 74 days	9‍–‍5	
184	14 Nov 2004	British Open	Brighton	John Higgins (16)	29 years, 180 days	Stephen Maguire (1)	23 years, 246 days	9‍–‍6	
185	28 Nov 2004	UK Championship	York	Stephen Maguire (2)	23 years, 260 days	David Gray (2)	25 years, 293 days	10‍–‍1	
186	23 Jan 2005	Welsh Open	Newport	Ronnie O'Sullivan (17)	29 years, 49 days	Stephen Hendry (19)	36 years, 10 days	9‍–‍8	
187	6 Feb 2005	Malta Cup	St Julian's	Stephen Hendry (36)	36 years, 24 days	Graeme Dott (4)	27 years, 270 days	9‍–‍7	
188	13 Mar 2005	Irish Masters	Dublin	Ronnie O'Sullivan (18)	29 years, 98 days	Matthew Stevens (4)	27 years, 183 days	10‍–‍8	
189	3 Apr 2005	China Open	Beijing	Ding Junhui (1)	18 years, 2 days	Stephen Hendry (20)	36 years, 80 days	9‍–‍5	
190	2 May 2005	World Snooker Championship	Sheffield	Shaun Murphy (1)	22 years, 265 days	Matthew Stevens (5)	27 years, 233 days	18‍–‍16	
191	16 Oct 2005	Grand Prix	Preston	John Higgins (17)	30 years, 151 days	Ronnie O'Sullivan (6)	29 years, 315 days	9‍–‍2	
192	18 Dec 2005	UK Championship	York	Ding Junhui (2)	18 years, 261 days	Steve Davis (13)	48 years, 118 days	10‍–‍6	
193	5 Feb 2006	Malta Cup	St Julian's	Ken Doherty (6)	36 years, 141 days	John Higgins (11)	30 years, 263 days	9‍–‍8	
194	5 Mar 2006	Welsh Open	Newport	Stephen Lee (4)	31 years, 144 days	Shaun Murphy (1)	23 years, 207 days	9‍–‍4	
195	26 Mar 2006	China Open	Beijing	Mark Williams (16)	31 years, 5 days	John Higgins (12)	30 years, 312 days	9‍–‍8	
196	1 May 2006	World Snooker Championship	Sheffield	Graeme Dott (1)	28 years, 354 days	Peter Ebdon (7)	35 years, 247 days	18‍–‍14	
197	20 Aug 2006	Northern Ireland Trophy	Belfast	Ding Junhui (3)	19 years, 141 days	Ronnie O'Sullivan (7)	30 years, 258 days	9‍–‍6	
198	29 Oct 2006	Grand Prix	Aberdeen	Neil Robertson (1)	24 years, 260 days	Jamie Cope (1)	21 years, 47 days	9‍–‍5	
199	17 Dec 2006	UK Championship	York	Peter Ebdon (7)	36 years, 112 days	Stephen Hendry (21)	37 years, 338 days	10‍–‍6	
200	4 Feb 2007	Malta Cup	St Julian's	Shaun Murphy (2)	24 years, 178 days	Ryan Day (1)	26 years, 318 days	9‍–‍4	
201	18 Feb 2007	Welsh Open	Newport	Neil Robertson (2)	25 years, 7 days	Andrew Higginson (1)	29 years, 67 days	9‍–‍8	
202	1 Apr 2007	China Open	Beijing	Graeme Dott (2)	29 years, 324 days	Jamie Cope (2)	21 years, 201 days	9‍–‍5	
203	7 May 2007	World Snooker Championship	Sheffield	John Higgins (18)	31 years, 354 days	Mark Selby (2)	23 years, 322 days	18‍–‍13	
204	12 Aug 2007	Shanghai Masters	Shanghai	Dominic Dale (2)	35 years, 226 days	Ryan Day (2)	27 years, 142 days	10‍–‍6	
205	21 Oct 2007	Grand Prix	Aberdeen	Marco Fu (1)	29 years, 286 days	Ronnie O'Sullivan (8)	31 years, 320 days	9‍–‍6	
206	11 Nov 2007	Northern Ireland Trophy	Belfast	Stephen Maguire (3)	26 years, 243 days	Fergal O'Brien (1)	35 years, 248 days	9‍–‍5	
207	16 Dec 2007	UK Championship	Telford	Ronnie O'Sullivan (19)	32 years, 11 days	Stephen Maguire (2)	26 years, 278 days	10‍–‍2	
208	17 Feb 2008	Welsh Open	Newport	Mark Selby (1)	24 years, 243 days	Ronnie O'Sullivan (9)	32 years, 74 days	9‍–‍8	
209	30 Mar 2008	China Open	Beijing	Stephen Maguire (4)	27 years, 17 days	Shaun Murphy (2)	25 years, 233 days	10‍–‍9	
210	5 May 2008	World Snooker Championship	Sheffield	Ronnie O'Sullivan (20)	32 years, 152 days	Ali Carter (1)	28 years, 285 days	18‍–‍8	
211	31 Aug 2008	Northern Ireland Trophy	Belfast	Ronnie O'Sullivan (21)	32 years, 270 days	Dave Harold (2)	41 years, 266 days	9‍–‍3	
212	5 Oct 2008	Shanghai Masters	Shanghai	Ricky Walden (1)	25 years, 329 days	Ronnie O'Sullivan (10)	32 years, 305 days	10‍–‍8	
213	19 Oct 2008	Grand Prix	Glasgow	John Higgins (19)	33 years, 154 days	Ryan Day (3)	28 years, 210 days	9‍–‍7	
214	15 Nov 2008	Bahrain Championship	Manama	Neil Robertson (3)	26 years, 278 days	Matthew Stevens (6)	31 years, 65 days	9‍–‍7	
215	21 Dec 2008	UK Championship	Telford	Shaun Murphy (3)	26 years, 133 days	Marco Fu (2)	30 years, 348 days	10‍–‍9	
216	22 Feb 2009	Welsh Open	Newport	Ali Carter (1)	29 years, 212 days	Joe Swail (1)	39 years, 177 days	9‍–‍5	
217	5 Apr 2009	China Open	Beijing	Peter Ebdon (8)	38 years, 221 days	John Higgins (13)	33 years, 322 days	10‍–‍8	
218	4 May 2009	World Snooker Championship	Sheffield	John Higgins (20)	33 years, 351 days	Shaun Murphy (3)	26 years, 267 days	18‍–‍9	
219	13 Sep 2009	Shanghai Masters	Shanghai	Ronnie O'Sullivan (22)	33 years, 282 days	Liang Wenbo (1)	22 years, 172 days	10‍–‍5	
220	11 Oct 2009	Grand Prix	Glasgow	Neil Robertson (4)	27 years, 242 days	Ding Junhui (1)	22 years, 193 days	9‍–‍4	
221	13 Dec 2009	UK Championship	Telford	Ding Junhui (4)	22 years, 256 days	John Higgins (14)	34 years, 209 days	10‍–‍8	
222	31 Jan 2010	Welsh Open	Newport	John Higgins (21)	34 years, 258 days	Ali Carter (2)	30 years, 190 days	9‍–‍4	
223	4 Apr 2010	China Open	Beijing	Mark Williams (17)	35 years, 14 days	Ding Junhui (2)	23 years, 3 days	10‍–‍6	
224	3 May 2010	World Snooker Championship	Sheffield	Neil Robertson (5)	28 years, 81 days	Graeme Dott (5)	32 years, 356 days	18‍–‍13	
225	12 Sep 2010	Shanghai Masters	Shanghai	Ali Carter (2)	31 years, 49 days	Jamie Burnett (1)	34 years, 361 days	10‍–‍7	
226	26 Sep 2010	World Open	Glasgow	Neil Robertson (6)	28 years, 227 days	Ronnie O'Sullivan (11)	34 years, 295 days	5‍–‍1	
227	12 Dec 2010	UK Championship	Telford	John Higgins (22)	35 years, 208 days	Mark Williams (8)	35 years, 266 days	10‍–‍9	
228	6 Feb 2011	German Masters	Berlin	Mark Williams (18)	35 years, 322 days	Mark Selby (3)	27 years, 232 days	9‍–‍7	
229	20 Feb 2011	Welsh Open	Newport	John Higgins (23)	35 years, 278 days	Stephen Maguire (3)	29 years, 344 days	9‍–‍6	
230	20 Mar 2011	Players Tour Championship	Dublin	Shaun Murphy (4)	28 years, 222 days	Martin Gould (1)	29 years, 187 days	4‍–‍0	
231	3 Apr 2011	China Open	Beijing	Judd Trump (1)	21 years, 226 days	Mark Selby (4)	27 years, 288 days	10‍–‍8	
232	2 May 2011	World Snooker Championship	Sheffield	John Higgins (24)	35 years, 349 days	Judd Trump (1)	21 years, 255 days	18‍–‍15	
233	24 Jul 2011	Australian Goldfields Open	Bendigo	Stuart Bingham (1)	35 years, 64 days	Mark Williams (9)	36 years, 125 days	9‍–‍8	
234	11 Sep 2011	Shanghai Masters	Shanghai	Mark Selby (2)	28 years, 84 days	Mark Williams (10)	36 years, 174 days	10‍–‍9	
235	11 Dec 2011	UK Championship	York	Judd Trump (2)	22 years, 113 days	Mark Allen (1)	25 years, 292 days	10‍–‍8	
236	5 Feb 2012	German Masters	Berlin	Ronnie O'Sullivan (23)	36 years, 62 days	Stephen Maguire (4)	30 years, 329 days	9‍–‍7	
237	19 Feb 2012	Welsh Open	Newport	Ding Junhui (5)	24 years, 324 days	Mark Selby (5)	28 years, 245 days	9‍–‍6	
238	4 Mar 2012	World Open	Haikou	Mark Allen (1)	26 years, 11 days	Stephen Lee (4)	37 years, 144 days	10‍–‍1	
239	18 Mar 2012	Players Tour Championship	Galway	Stephen Lee (5)	37 years, 158 days	Neil Robertson (1)	30 years, 36 days	4‍–‍0	
240	1 Apr 2012	China Open	Beijing	Peter Ebdon (9)	41 years, 218 days	Stephen Maguire (5)	31 years, 19 days	10‍–‍9	
241	7 May 2012	World Snooker Championship	Sheffield	Ronnie O'Sullivan (24)	36 years, 154 days	Ali Carter (3)	32 years, 287 days	18‍–‍11	
242	1 Jul 2012	Wuxi Classic	Wuxi	Ricky Walden (2)	29 years, 233 days	Stuart Bingham (1)	36 years, 41 days	10‍–‍4	
243	15 Jul 2012	Australian Goldfields Open	Bendigo	Barry Hawkins (1)	33 years, 83 days	Peter Ebdon (8)	41 years, 323 days	9‍–‍3	
244	23 Sep 2012	Shanghai Masters	Shanghai	John Higgins (25)	37 years, 128 days	Judd Trump (2)	23 years, 34 days	10‍–‍9	
245	4 Nov 2012	International Championship	Chengdu	Judd Trump (3)	23 years, 76 days	Neil Robertson (2)	30 years, 267 days	10‍–‍8	
246	9 Dec 2012	UK Championship	York	Mark Selby (3)	29 years, 173 days	Shaun Murphy (4)	30 years, 121 days	10‍–‍6	
247	3 Feb 2013	German Masters	Berlin	Ali Carter (3)	33 years, 193 days	Marco Fu (3)	35 years, 26 days	9‍–‍6	
248	17 Feb 2013	Welsh Open	Newport	Stephen Maguire (5)	31 years, 341 days	Stuart Bingham (2)	36 years, 272 days	9‍–‍8	
249	3 Mar 2013	World Open	Haikou	Mark Allen (2)	27 years, 9 days	Matthew Stevens (7)	35 years, 173 days	10‍–‍4	
250	17 Mar 2013	Players Tour Championship	Galway	Ding Junhui (6)	25 years, 350 days	Neil Robertson (3)	31 years, 34 days	4‍–‍3	
251	31 Mar 2013	China Open	Beijing	Neil Robertson (7)	31 years, 48 days	Mark Selby (6)	29 years, 285 days	10‍–‍6	
252	6 May 2013	World Snooker Championship	Sheffield	Ronnie O'Sullivan (25)	37 years, 152 days	Barry Hawkins (1)	34 years, 13 days	18‍–‍12	
253	23 Jun 2013	Wuxi Classic	Wuxi	Neil Robertson (8)	31 years, 132 days	John Higgins (15)	38 years, 36 days	10‍–‍7	
254	14 Jul 2013	Australian Goldfields Open	Bendigo	Marco Fu (2)	35 years, 187 days	Neil Robertson (4)	31 years, 153 days	9‍–‍6	
255	22 Sep 2013	Shanghai Masters	Shanghai	Ding Junhui (7)	26 years, 174 days	Xiao Guodong (1)	24 years, 224 days	10‍–‍6	
256	18 Oct 2013	Indian Open	New Delhi	Ding Junhui (8)	26 years, 200 days	Aditya Mehta (1)	27 years, 352 days	5‍–‍0	
257	3 Nov 2013	International Championship	Chengdu	Ding Junhui (9)	26 years, 216 days	Marco Fu (4)	35 years, 299 days	10‍–‍9	
258	8 Dec 2013	UK Championship	York	Neil Robertson (9)	31 years, 300 days	Mark Selby (7)	30 years, 172 days	10‍–‍7	
259	2 Feb 2014	German Masters	Berlin	Ding Junhui (10)	26 years, 307 days	Judd Trump (3)	24 years, 166 days	9‍–‍5	
260	2 Mar 2014	Welsh Open	Newport	Ronnie O'Sullivan (26)	38 years, 87 days	Ding Junhui (3)	26 years, 335 days	9‍–‍3	
261	16 Mar 2014	World Open	Haikou	Shaun Murphy (5)	31 years, 218 days	Mark Selby (8)	30 years, 270 days	10‍–‍6	
262	29 Mar 2014	Players Tour Championship	Preston	Barry Hawkins (2)	34 years, 340 days	Gerard Greene (1)	40 years, 137 days	4‍–‍0	
263	6 Apr 2014	China Open	Beijing	Ding Junhui (11)	27 years, 5 days	Neil Robertson (5)	32 years, 54 days	10‍–‍5	
264	5 May 2014	World Snooker Championship	Sheffield	Mark Selby (4)	30 years, 320 days	Ronnie O'Sullivan (12)	38 years, 151 days	18‍–‍14	
265	29 Jun 2014	Wuxi Classic	Wuxi	Neil Robertson (10)	32 years, 138 days	Joe Perry (2)	39 years, 320 days	10‍–‍9	
266	6 Jul 2014	Australian Goldfields Open	Bendigo	Judd Trump (4)	24 years, 320 days	Neil Robertson (6)	32 years, 145 days	9‍–‍5	
267	14 Sep 2014	Shanghai Masters	Shanghai	Stuart Bingham (2)	38 years, 116 days	Mark Allen (2)	28 years, 204 days	10‍–‍3	
268	2 Nov 2014	International Championship	Chengdu	Ricky Walden (3)	31 years, 356 days	Mark Allen (3)	28 years, 253 days	10‍–‍7	
269	7 Dec 2014	UK Championship	York	Ronnie O'Sullivan (27)	39 years, 2 days	Judd Trump (4)	25 years, 109 days	10‍–‍9	
270	8 Feb 2015	German Masters	Berlin	Mark Selby (5)	31 years, 234 days	Shaun Murphy (5)	32 years, 182 days	9‍–‍7	
271	22 Feb 2015	Welsh Open	Cardiff	John Higgins (26)	39 years, 280 days	Ben Woollaston (1)	27 years, 284 days	9‍–‍3	
272	14 Mar 2015	Indian Open	Mumbai	Michael White (1)	23 years, 252 days	Ricky Walden (1)	32 years, 123 days	5‍–‍0	
273	28 Mar 2015	Players Tour Championship	Bangkok	Joe Perry (1)	40 years, 227 days	Mark Williams (11)	40 years, 7 days	4‍–‍3	
274	5 Apr 2015	China Open	Beijing	Mark Selby (6)	31 years, 290 days	Gary Wilson (1)	29 years, 237 days	10‍–‍2	
275	4 May 2015	World Snooker Championship	Sheffield	Stuart Bingham (3)	38 years, 348 days	Shaun Murphy (6)	32 years, 267 days	18‍–‍15	
276	5 Jul 2015	Australian Goldfields Open	Bendigo	John Higgins (27)	40 years, 48 days	Martin Gould (2)	33 years, 294 days	9‍–‍8	
277	20 Sep 2015	Shanghai Masters	Shanghai	Kyren Wilson (1)	23 years, 271 days	Judd Trump (5)	26 years, 31 days	10‍–‍9	
278	1 Nov 2015	International Championship	Daqing	John Higgins (28)	40 years, 167 days	David Gilbert (1)	34 years, 142 days	10‍–‍5	
279	6 Dec 2015	UK Championship	York	Neil Robertson (11)	33 years, 298 days	Liang Wenbo (2)	28 years, 256 days	10‍–‍5	
280	7 Feb 2016	German Masters	Berlin	Martin Gould (1)	34 years, 146 days	Luca Brecel (1)	20 years, 336 days	9‍–‍5	
281	21 Feb 2016	Welsh Open	Cardiff	Ronnie O'Sullivan (28)	40 years, 78 days	Neil Robertson (7)	34 years, 10 days	9‍–‍5	
282	13 Mar 2016	World Grand Prix	Llandudno	Shaun Murphy (6)	33 years, 216 days	Stuart Bingham (3)	39 years, 297 days	10‍–‍9	
283	27 Mar 2016	Players Tour Championship	Manchester	Mark Allen (3)	30 years, 34 days	Ricky Walden (2)	33 years, 137 days	10‍–‍6	
284	3 Apr 2016	China Open	Beijing	Judd Trump (5)	26 years, 227 days	Ricky Walden (3)	33 years, 144 days	10‍–‍4	
285	2 May 2016	World Snooker Championship	Sheffield	Mark Selby (7)	32 years, 318 days	Ding Junhui (4)	29 years, 31 days	18‍–‍14	
286	24 Jun 2016	Riga Masters	Riga	Neil Robertson (12)	34 years, 134 days	Michael Holt (1)	37 years, 322 days	5‍–‍2	
287	9 Jul 2016	Indian Open	Hyderabad	Anthony McGill (1)	25 years, 155 days	Kyren Wilson (1)	24 years, 199 days	5‍–‍2	
288	31 Jul 2016	World Open	Yushan	Ali Carter (4)	37 years, 6 days	Joe Perry (3)	41 years, 353 days	10‍–‍8	
289	28 Aug 2016	Paul Hunter Classic	Fürth	Mark Selby (8)	33 years, 70 days	Tom Ford (1)	33 years, 11 days	4‍–‍2	
290	25 Sep 2016	Shanghai Masters	Shanghai	Ding Junhui (12)	29 years, 177 days	Mark Selby (9)	33 years, 98 days	10‍–‍6	
291	9 Oct 2016	European Masters	Bucharest	Judd Trump (6)	27 years, 50 days	Ronnie O'Sullivan (13)	40 years, 309 days	9‍–‍8	
292	16 Oct 2016	English Open	Manchester	Liang Wenbo (1)	29 years, 205 days	Judd Trump (6)	27 years, 57 days	9‍–‍6	
293	30 Oct 2016	International Championship	Daqing	Mark Selby (9)	33 years, 133 days	Ding Junhui (5)	29 years, 212 days	10‍–‍1	
294	20 Nov 2016	Northern Ireland Open	Belfast	Mark King (1)	42 years, 237 days	Barry Hawkins (2)	37 years, 211 days	9‍–‍8	
295	4 Dec 2016	UK Championship	York	Mark Selby (10)	33 years, 168 days	Ronnie O'Sullivan (14)	40 years, 365 days	10‍–‍7	
296	18 Dec 2016	Scottish Open	Glasgow	Marco Fu (3)	38 years, 345 days	John Higgins (16)	41 years, 214 days	9‍–‍4	
297	5 Feb 2017	German Masters	Berlin	Anthony Hamilton (1)	45 years, 221 days	Ali Carter (4)	37 years, 195 days	9‍–‍6	
298	12 Feb 2017	World Grand Prix	Preston	Barry Hawkins (3)	37 years, 295 days	Ryan Day (4)	36 years, 326 days	10‍–‍7	
299	19 Feb 2017	Welsh Open	Cardiff	Stuart Bingham (4)	40 years, 274 days	Judd Trump (7)	27 years, 183 days	9‍–‍8	
300	26 Feb 2017	Snooker Shoot Out	Watford	Anthony McGill (2)	26 years, 21 days	Xiao Guodong (2)	28 years, 16 days	1‍–‍0	
301	5 Mar 2017	Gibraltar Open	Gibraltar	Shaun Murphy (7)	34 years, 207 days	Judd Trump (8)	27 years, 197 days	4‍–‍2	
302	12 Mar 2017	Players Championship	Llandudno	Judd Trump (7)	27 years, 204 days	Marco Fu (5)	39 years, 63 days	10‍–‍8	
303	2 Apr 2017	China Open	Beijing	Mark Selby (11)	33 years, 287 days	Mark Williams (12)	42 years, 12 days	10‍–‍8	
304	1 May 2017	World Snooker Championship	Sheffield	Mark Selby (12)	33 years, 316 days	John Higgins (17)	41 years, 348 days	18‍–‍15	
305	25 Jun 2017	Riga Masters	Riga	Ryan Day (1)	37 years, 94 days	Stephen Maguire (6)	36 years, 104 days	5‍–‍2	
306	22 Aug 2017	China Championship	Guangzhou	Luca Brecel (1)	22 years, 167 days	Shaun Murphy (7)	35 years, 12 days	10‍–‍5	
307	27 Aug 2017	Paul Hunter Classic	Fürth	Michael White (2)	26 years, 53 days	Shaun Murphy (8)	35 years, 17 days	4‍–‍2	
308	16 Sep 2017	Indian Open	Visakhapatnam	John Higgins (29)	42 years, 121 days	Anthony McGill (1)	26 years, 223 days	5‍–‍1	
309	24 Sep 2017	World Open	Yushan	Ding Junhui (13)	30 years, 176 days	Kyren Wilson (2)	25 years, 275 days	10‍–‍3	
310	8 Oct 2017	European Masters	Lommel	Judd Trump (8)	28 years, 49 days	Stuart Bingham (4)	41 years, 140 days	9‍–‍7	
311	22 Oct 2017	English Open	Barnsley	Ronnie O'Sullivan (29)	41 years, 321 days	Kyren Wilson (3)	25 years, 303 days	9‍–‍2	
312	5 Nov 2017	International Championship	Daqing	Mark Selby (13)	34 years, 139 days	Mark Allen (4)	31 years, 256 days	10‍–‍7	
313	18 Nov 2017	Shanghai Masters	Shanghai	Ronnie O'Sullivan (30)	41 years, 348 days	Judd Trump (9)	28 years, 90 days	10‍–‍3	
314	26 Nov 2017	Northern Ireland Open	Belfast	Mark Williams (19)	42 years, 250 days	Yan Bingtao (1)	17 years, 283 days	9‍–‍8	
315	10 Dec 2017	UK Championship	York	Ronnie O'Sullivan (31)	42 years, 5 days	Shaun Murphy (9)	35 years, 122 days	10‍–‍5	
316	17 Dec 2017	Scottish Open	Glasgow	Neil Robertson (13)	35 years, 309 days	Cao Yupeng (1)	27 years, 51 days	9‍–‍8	
317	4 Feb 2018	German Masters	Berlin	Mark Williams (20)	42 years, 320 days	Graeme Dott (6)	40 years, 268 days	9‍–‍1	
318	11 Feb 2018	Snooker Shoot Out	Watford	Michael Georgiou (1)	30 years, 24 days	Graeme Dott (7)	40 years, 275 days	1‍–‍0	
319	25 Feb 2018	World Grand Prix	Preston	Ronnie O'Sullivan (32)	42 years, 82 days	Ding Junhui (6)	30 years, 330 days	10‍–‍3	
320	4 Mar 2018	Welsh Open	Cardiff	John Higgins (30)	42 years, 290 days	Barry Hawkins (3)	38 years, 315 days	9‍–‍7	
321	11 Mar 2018	Gibraltar Open	Gibraltar	Ryan Day (2)	37 years, 353 days	Cao Yupeng (2)	27 years, 135 days	4‍–‍0	
322	25 Mar 2018	Players Championship	Llandudno	Ronnie O'Sullivan (33)	42 years, 110 days	Shaun Murphy (10)	35 years, 227 days	10‍–‍4	
323	8 Apr 2018	China Open	Beijing	Mark Selby (14)	34 years, 293 days	Barry Hawkins (4)	38 years, 350 days	11‍–‍3	
324	7 May 2018	World Snooker Championship	Sheffield	Mark Williams (21)	43 years, 47 days	John Higgins (18)	42 years, 354 days	18‍–‍16	
325	29 Jul 2018	Riga Masters	Riga	Neil Robertson (14)	36 years, 168 days	Jack Lisowski (1)	27 years, 34 days	5‍–‍2	
326	12 Aug 2018	World Open	Yushan	Mark Williams (22)	43 years, 144 days	David Gilbert (2)	37 years, 61 days	10‍–‍9	
327	26 Aug 2018	Paul Hunter Classic	Fürth	Kyren Wilson (2)	26 years, 246 days	Peter Ebdon (9)	47 years, 364 days	4‍–‍2	
328	30 Sep 2018	China Championship	Guangzhou	Mark Selby (15)	35 years, 103 days	John Higgins (19)	43 years, 135 days	10‍–‍9	
329	7 Oct 2018	European Masters	Lommel	Jimmy Robertson (1)	32 years, 157 days	Joe Perry (4)	44 years, 55 days	9‍–‍6	
330	21 Oct 2018	English Open	Crawley	Stuart Bingham (5)	42 years, 153 days	Mark Davis (1)	46 years, 70 days	9‍–‍7	
331	4 Nov 2018	International Championship	Daqing	Mark Allen (4)	32 years, 255 days	Neil Robertson (8)	36 years, 266 days	10‍–‍5	
332	18 Nov 2018	Northern Ireland Open	Belfast	Judd Trump (9)	29 years, 90 days	Ronnie O'Sullivan (15)	42 years, 348 days	9‍–‍7	
333	9 Dec 2018	UK Championship	York	Ronnie O'Sullivan (34)	43 years, 4 days	Mark Allen (5)	32 years, 290 days	10‍–‍6	
334	16 Dec 2018	Scottish Open	Glasgow	Mark Allen (5)	32 years, 297 days	Shaun Murphy (11)	36 years, 128 days	9‍–‍7	
335	3 Feb 2019	German Masters	Berlin	Kyren Wilson (3)	27 years, 42 days	David Gilbert (3)	37 years, 236 days	9‍–‍7	
336	10 Feb 2019	World Grand Prix	Cheltenham	Judd Trump (10)	29 years, 174 days	Ali Carter (5)	39 years, 200 days	10‍–‍6	
337	17 Feb 2019	Welsh Open	Cardiff	Neil Robertson (15)	37 years, 6 days	Stuart Bingham (5)	42 years, 272 days	9‍–‍7	
338	24 Feb 2019	Snooker Shoot Out	Watford	Thepchaiya Un-Nooh (1)	33 years, 312 days	Michael Holt (2)	40 years, 201 days	1‍–‍0	
339	3 Mar 2019	Indian Open	Kochi	Matthew Selt (1)	33 years, 361 days	Lyu Haotian (1)	21 years, 94 days	5‍–‍3	
340	10 Mar 2019	Players Championship	Preston	Ronnie O'Sullivan (35)	43 years, 95 days	Neil Robertson (9)	37 years, 27 days	10‍–‍4	
341	17 Mar 2019	Gibraltar Open	Gibraltar	Stuart Bingham (6)	42 years, 300 days	Ryan Day (5)	38 years, 359 days	4‍–‍1	
342	24 Mar 2019	Tour Championship	Llandudno	Ronnie O'Sullivan (36)	43 years, 109 days	Neil Robertson (10)	37 years, 41 days	13‍–‍11	
343	7 Apr 2019	China Open	Beijing	Neil Robertson (16)	37 years, 55 days	Jack Lisowski (2)	27 years, 286 days	11‍–‍4	
344	6 May 2019	World Snooker Championship	Sheffield	Judd Trump (11)	29 years, 259 days	John Higgins (20)	43 years, 353 days	18‍–‍9	
345	28 Jul 2019	Riga Masters	Riga	Yan Bingtao (1)	19 years, 162 days	Mark Joyce (1)	35 years, 351 days	5‍–‍2	
346	11 Aug 2019	International Championship	Daqing	Judd Trump (12)	29 years, 356 days	Shaun Murphy (12)	37 years, 1 day	10‍–‍3	
347	29 Sep 2019	China Championship	Guangzhou	Shaun Murphy (8)	37 years, 50 days	Mark Williams (13)	44 years, 192 days	10‍–‍9	
348	20 Oct 2019	English Open	Crawley	Mark Selby (16)	36 years, 123 days	David Gilbert (4)	38 years, 130 days	9‍–‍1	
349	3 Nov 2019	World Open	Yushan	Judd Trump (13)	30 years, 75 days	Thepchaiya Un-Nooh (1)	34 years, 199 days	10‍–‍5	
350	17 Nov 2019	Northern Ireland Open	Belfast	Judd Trump (14)	30 years, 89 days	Ronnie O'Sullivan (16)	43 years, 347 days	9‍–‍7	
351	8 Dec 2019	UK Championship	York	Ding Junhui (14)	32 years, 251 days	Stephen Maguire (7)	38 years, 270 days	10‍–‍6	
352	15 Dec 2019	Scottish Open	Glasgow	Mark Selby (17)	36 years, 179 days	Jack Lisowski (3)	28 years, 173 days	9‍–‍6	
353	26 Jan 2020	European Masters (2019–2020 season)	Dornbirn	Neil Robertson (17)	37 years, 349 days	Zhou Yuelong (1)	22 years, 2 days	9‍–‍0	
354	2 Feb 2020	German Masters	Berlin	Judd Trump (15)	30 years, 166 days	Neil Robertson (11)	37 years, 356 days	9‍–‍6	
355	9 Feb 2020	World Grand Prix (2019–2020 season)	Cheltenham	Neil Robertson (18)	37 years, 363 days	Graeme Dott (8)	42 years, 273 days	10‍–‍8	
356	16 Feb 2020	Welsh Open	Cardiff	Shaun Murphy (9)	37 years, 190 days	Kyren Wilson (4)	28 years, 55 days	9‍–‍1	
357	23 Feb 2020	Snooker Shoot Out	Watford	Michael Holt (1)	41 years, 200 days	Zhou Yuelong (2)	22 years, 30 days	1‍–‍0	
358	1 Mar 2020	Players Championship	Southport	Judd Trump (16)	30 years, 194 days	Yan Bingtao (2)	20 years, 14 days	10‍–‍4	
359	15 Mar 2020	Gibraltar Open	Gibraltar	Judd Trump (17)	30 years, 208 days	Kyren Wilson (5)	28 years, 83 days	4‍–‍3	
360	26 Jun 2020	Tour Championship	Milton Keynes	Stephen Maguire (6)	39 years, 105 days	Mark Allen (6)	34 years, 125 days	10‍–‍6	
361	16 Aug 2020	World Snooker Championship	Sheffield	Ronnie O'Sullivan (37)	44 years, 255 days	Kyren Wilson (6)	28 years, 237 days	18‍–‍8	
362	27 Sep 2020	European Masters (2020–2021 season)	Milton Keynes	Mark Selby (18)	37 years, 100 days	Martin Gould (3)	39 years, 13 days	9‍–‍8	
363	18 Oct 2020	English Open	Milton Keynes	Judd Trump (18)	31 years, 59 days	Neil Robertson (12)	38 years, 250 days	9‍–‍8	
364	30 Oct 2020	Championship League	Milton Keynes	Kyren Wilson (4)	28 years, 312 days	Judd Trump (10)	31 years, 71 days	3‍–‍1	
365	22 Nov 2020	Northern Ireland Open	Milton Keynes	Judd Trump (19)	31 years, 94 days	Ronnie O'Sullivan (17)	44 years, 353 days	9‍–‍7	
366	6 Dec 2020	UK Championship	Milton Keynes	Neil Robertson (19)	38 years, 299 days	Judd Trump (11)	31 years, 108 days	10‍–‍9	
367	13 Dec 2020	Scottish Open	Milton Keynes	Mark Selby (19)	37 years, 177 days	Ronnie O'Sullivan (18)	45 years, 8 days	9‍–‍3	
368	20 Dec 2020	World Grand Prix (2020–2021 season)	Milton Keynes	Judd Trump (20)	31 years, 122 days	Jack Lisowski (4)	29 years, 178 days	10‍–‍7	
369	31 Jan 2021	German Masters	Milton Keynes	Judd Trump (21)	31 years, 164 days	Jack Lisowski (5)	29 years, 220 days	9‍–‍2	
370	7 Feb 2021	Snooker Shoot Out	Milton Keynes	Ryan Day (3)	40 years, 321 days	Mark Selby (10)	37 years, 233 days	1‍–‍0	
371	21 Feb 2021	Welsh Open	Newport	Jordan Brown (1)	33 years, 135 days	Ronnie O'Sullivan (19)	45 years, 78 days	9‍–‍8	
372	28 Feb 2021	Players Championship	Milton Keynes	John Higgins (31)	45 years, 286 days	Ronnie O'Sullivan (20)	45 years, 85 days	10‍–‍3	
373	7 Mar 2021	Gibraltar Open	Milton Keynes	Judd Trump (22)	31 years, 199 days	Jack Lisowski (6)	29 years, 255 days	4‍–‍0	
374	21 Mar 2021	WST Pro Series	Milton Keynes	Mark Williams (23)	46 years, 0 days	Ali Carter (6)	41 years, 239 days	RR	
375	28 Mar 2021	Tour Championship	Newport	Neil Robertson (20)	39 years, 45 days	Ronnie O'Sullivan (21)	45 years, 113 days	10‍–‍4	
376	3 May 2021	World Snooker Championship	Sheffield	Mark Selby (20)	37 years, 318 days	Shaun Murphy (13)	38 years, 266 days	18‍–‍15	
377	13 Aug 2021	Championship League	Leicester	David Gilbert (1)	40 years, 62 days	Mark Allen (7)	35 years, 172 days	3‍–‍1	
378	22 Aug 2021	British Open	Leicester	Mark Williams (24)	46 years, 154 days	Gary Wilson (2)	36 years, 11 days	6‍–‍4	
379	17 Oct 2021	Northern Ireland Open	Belfast	Mark Allen (6)	35 years, 237 days	John Higgins (21)	46 years, 152 days	9‍–‍8	
380	7 Nov 2021	English Open	Milton Keynes	Neil Robertson (21)	39 years, 269 days	John Higgins (22)	46 years, 173 days	9‍–‍8	
381	5 Dec 2021	UK Championship	York	Zhao Xintong (1)	24 years, 246 days	Luca Brecel (2)	26 years, 272 days	10‍–‍5	
382	12 Dec 2021	Scottish Open	Llandudno	Luca Brecel (2)	26 years, 279 days	John Higgins (23)	46 years, 208 days	9‍–‍5	
383	19 Dec 2021	World Grand Prix	Coventry	Ronnie O'Sullivan (38)	46 years, 14 days	Neil Robertson (13)	39 years, 311 days	10‍–‍8	
384	23 Jan 2022	Snooker Shoot Out	Leicester	Hossein Vafaei (1)	27 years, 100 days	Mark Williams (14)	46 years, 308 days	1‍–‍0	
385	30 Jan 2022	German Masters	Berlin	Zhao Xintong (2)	24 years, 302 days	Yan Bingtao (3)	21 years, 348 days	9‍–‍0	
386	13 Feb 2022	Players Championship	Wolverhampton	Neil Robertson (22)	40 years, 2 days	Barry Hawkins (5)	42 years, 296 days	10‍–‍5	
387	27 Feb 2022	European Masters (2021–2022 season)	Milton Keynes	Fan Zhengyi (1)	21 years, 31 days	Ronnie O'Sullivan (22)	46 years, 84 days	10‍–‍9	
388	6 Mar 2022	Welsh Open	Newport	Joe Perry (2)	47 years, 205 days	Judd Trump (12)	32 years, 198 days	9‍–‍5	
389	13 Mar 2022	Turkish Masters	Antalya	Judd Trump (23)	32 years, 205 days	Matthew Selt (1)	37 years, 6 days	10‍–‍4	
390	26 Mar 2022	Gibraltar Open	Gibraltar	Robert Milkins (1)	46 years, 20 days	Kyren Wilson (7)	30 years, 93 days	4‍–‍2	
391	3 Apr 2022	Tour Championship	Llandudno	Neil Robertson (23)	40 years, 51 days	John Higgins (24)	46 years, 320 days	10‍–‍9	
392	2 May 2022	World Snooker Championship	Sheffield	Ronnie O'Sullivan (39)	46 years, 148 days	Judd Trump (13)	32 years, 255 days	18‍–‍13	
393	29 Jul 2022	Championship League	Leicester	Luca Brecel (3)	27 years, 143 days	Lu Ning (1)	28 years, 209 days	3‍–‍1	
394	21 Aug 2022	European Masters (2022–2023 season)	Fürth	Kyren Wilson (5)	30 years, 241 days	Barry Hawkins (6)	43 years, 120 days	9‍–‍3	
395	2 Oct 2022	British Open	Milton Keynes	Ryan Day (4)	42 years, 193 days	Mark Allen (8)	36 years, 222 days	10‍–‍7	
396	23 Oct 2022	Northern Ireland Open	Belfast	Mark Allen (7)	36 years, 243 days	Zhou Yuelong (3)	24 years, 272 days	9‍–‍4	
397	20 Nov 2022	UK Championship	York	Mark Allen (8)	36 years, 271 days	Ding Junhui (7)	35 years, 233 days	10‍–‍7	
398	4 Dec 2022	Scottish Open	Edinburgh	Gary Wilson (1)	37 years, 115 days	Joe O'Connor (1)	27 years, 26 days	9‍–‍2	
399	18 Dec 2022	English Open	Brentwood	Mark Selby (21)	39 years, 182 days	Luca Brecel (3)	27 years, 285 days	9‍–‍6	
400	22 Jan 2023	World Grand Prix	Cheltenham	Mark Allen (9)	36 years, 334 days	Judd Trump (14)	33 years, 155 days	10‍–‍9	
401	28 Jan 2023	Snooker Shoot Out (2022–2023 season)	Leicester	Chris Wakelin (1)	30 years, 318 days	Julien Leclercq (1)	19 years, 359 days	1‍–‍0	
402	5 Feb 2023	German Masters	Berlin	Ali Carter (5)	43 years, 195 days	Tom Ford (2)	39 years, 172 days	10‍–‍3	
403	19 Feb 2023	Welsh Open	Llandudno	Robert Milkins (2)	46 years, 350 days	Shaun Murphy (14)	40 years, 193 days	9‍–‍7	
404	26 Feb 2023	Players Championship	Wolverhampton	Shaun Murphy (10)	40 years, 200 days	Ali Carter (7)	43 years, 216 days	10‍–‍4	
405	22 Mar 2023	WST Classic	Leicester	Mark Selby (22)	39 years, 276 days	Pang Junxu (1)	23 years, 35 days	6‍–‍2	
406	2 Apr 2023	Tour Championship	Hull	Shaun Murphy (11)	40 years, 235 days	Kyren Wilson (8)	31 years, 100 days	10‍–‍7	
407	1 May 2023	World Snooker Championship	Sheffield	Luca Brecel (4)	28 years, 54 days	Mark Selby (11)	39 years, 316 days	18‍–‍15	
408	21 Jul 2023	Championship League	Leicester	Shaun Murphy (12)	40 years, 345 days	Mark Williams (15)	48 years, 122 days	3‍–‍0	
409	27 Aug 2023	European Masters	Nuremberg	Barry Hawkins (4)	44 years, 126 days	Judd Trump (15)	34 years, 7 days	9‍–‍6	
410	1 Oct 2023	British Open	Cheltenham	Mark Williams (25)	48 years, 194 days	Mark Selby (12)	40 years, 104 days	10‍–‍7	
411	8 Oct 2023	English Open	Brentwood	Judd Trump (24)	34 years, 49 days	Zhang Anda (1)	31 years, 287 days	9‍–‍7	
412	15 Oct 2023	Wuhan Open	Wuhan	Judd Trump (25)	34 years, 56 days	Ali Carter (8)	44 years, 82 days	10‍–‍7	
413	29 Oct 2023	Northern Ireland Open	Belfast	Judd Trump (26)	34 years, 70 days	Chris Wakelin (1)	31 years, 227 days	9‍–‍3	
414	12 Nov 2023	International Championship	Tianjin	Zhang Anda (1)	31 years, 322 days	Tom Ford (3)	40 years, 87 days	10‍–‍6	
415	3 Dec 2023	UK Championship	York	Ronnie O'Sullivan (40)	47 years, 363 days	Ding Junhui (8)	36 years, 246 days	10‍–‍7	
416	9 Dec 2023	Snooker Shoot Out (2023–2024 season)	Swansea	Mark Allen (10)	37 years, 290 days	Cao Yupeng (3)	33 years, 43 days	1‍–‍0	
417	17 Dec 2023	Scottish Open	Edinburgh	Gary Wilson (2)	38 years, 128 days	Noppon Saengkham (1)	31 years, 155 days	9‍–‍5	
418	21 Jan 2024	World Grand Prix	Leicester	Ronnie O'Sullivan (41)	48 years, 47 days	Judd Trump (16)	34 years, 154 days	10‍–‍7	
419	4 Feb 2024	German Masters	Berlin	Judd Trump (27)	34 years, 168 days	Si Jiahui (1)	21 years, 208 days	10‍–‍5	
420	18 Feb 2024	Welsh Open	Llandudno	Gary Wilson (3)	38 years, 191 days	Martin O'Donnell (1)	37 years, 259 days	9‍–‍4	
421	25 Feb 2024	Players Championship	Telford	Mark Allen (11)	38 years, 3 days	Zhang Anda (2)	32 years, 62 days	10‍–‍8	
422	24 Mar 2024	World Open	Yushan	Judd Trump (28)	34 years, 217 days	Ding Junhui (9)	36 years, 358 days	10‍–‍4	
423	7 Apr 2024	Tour Championship	Manchester	Mark Williams (26)	49 years, 17 days	Ronnie O'Sullivan (23)	48 years, 124 days	10‍–‍5	
424	6 May 2024	World Snooker Championship	Sheffield	Kyren Wilson (6)	32 years, 135 days	Jak Jones (1)	30 years, 282 days	18‍–‍14	
425	3 Jul 2024	Championship League	Leicester	Ali Carter (6)	44 years, 344 days	Jackson Page (1)	22 years, 330 days	3‍–‍1	
426	25 Aug 2024	Xi'an Grand Prix	Xi'an	Kyren Wilson (7)	32 years, 246 days	Judd Trump (17)	35 years, 5 days	10‍–‍8	
427	7 Sep 2024	Saudi Arabia Masters	Riyadh	Judd Trump (29)	35 years, 18 days	Mark Williams (16)	49 years, 170 days	10‍–‍9	
428	22 Sep 2024	English Open	Brentwood	Neil Robertson (24)	42 years, 224 days	Wu Yize (1)	20 years, 344 days	9‍–‍7	
429	29 Sep 2024	British Open	Cheltenham	Mark Selby (23)	41 years, 102 days	John Higgins (25)	49 years, 134 days	10‍–‍5	
430	12 Oct 2024	Wuhan Open	Wuhan	Xiao Guodong (1)	35 years, 245 days	Si Jiahui (2)	22 years, 93 days	10‍–‍7	
431	27 Oct 2024	Northern Ireland Open	Belfast	Kyren Wilson (8)	32 years, 309 days	Judd Trump (18)	35 years, 68 days	9‍–‍3	
432	10 Nov 2024	International Championship	Nanjing	Ding Junhui (15)	37 years, 223 days	Chris Wakelin (2)	32 years, 239 days	10‍–‍7	
433	1 Dec 2024	UK Championship	York	Judd Trump (30)	35 years, 103 days	Barry Hawkins (7)	45 years, 222 days	10‍–‍8	
434	7 Dec 2024	Snooker Shoot Out	Leicester	Tom Ford (1)	41 years, 112 days	Liam Graham (1)	20 years, 86 days	1‍–‍0	
435	15 Dec 2024	Scottish Open	Edinburgh	Lei Peifan (1)	21 years, 198 days	Wu Yize (2)	21 years, 62 days	9‍–‍5	
436	2 Feb 2025	German Masters	Berlin	Kyren Wilson (9)	33 years, 41 days	Barry Hawkins (8)	45 years, 285 days	10‍–‍9	
437	16 Feb 2025	Welsh Open	Llandudno	Mark Selby (24)	41 years, 242 days	Stephen Maguire (8)	43 years, 340 days	9‍–‍6	
438	1 Mar 2025	World Open	Yushan	John Higgins (32)	49 years, 287 days	Joe O'Connor (2)	29 years, 113 days	10‍–‍6	
439	9 Mar 2025	World Grand Prix	Hong Kong	Neil Robertson (25)	43 years, 26 days	Stuart Bingham (6)	48 years, 292 days	10‍–‍0	
440	23 Mar 2025	Players Championship	Telford	Kyren Wilson (10)	33 years, 90 days	Judd Trump (19)	35 years, 215 days	10‍–‍9	
441	6 Apr 2025	Tour Championship	Manchester	John Higgins (33)	49 years, 323 days	Mark Selby (13)	41 years, 291 days	10‍–‍8	
442	5 May 2025	World Snooker Championship	Sheffield	Zhao Xintong (3)	28 years, 32 days	Mark Williams (17)	50 years, 45 days	18‍–‍12	
443	23 Jul 2025	Championship League	Leicester	Stephen Maguire (7)	44 years, 132 days	Joe O'Connor (3)	29 years, 257 days	3‍–‍1	
444	16 Aug 2025	Saudi Arabia Masters	Jeddah	Neil Robertson (26)	43 years, 186 days	Ronnie O'Sullivan (24)	49 years, 254 days	10‍–‍9	
445	30 Aug 2025	Wuhan Open	Wuhan	Xiao Guodong (2)	36 years, 201 days	Gary Wilson (3)	40 years, 19 days	10‍–‍9	
446	21 Sep 2025	English Open	Brentwood	Mark Allen (12)	39 years, 211 days	Zhou Yuelong (4)	27 years, 240 days	9‍–‍8	
447	28 Sep 2025	British Open	Cheltenham	Shaun Murphy (13)	43 years, 49 days	Anthony McGill (2)	34 years, 235 days	10‍–‍7	
448	13 Oct 2025	Xi'an Grand Prix	Xi'an	Mark Williams (27)	50 years, 206 days	Shaun Murphy (15)	43 years, 64 days	10‍–‍3	
449	26 Oct 2025	Northern Ireland Open	Belfast	Jack Lisowski (1)	34 years, 123 days	Judd Trump (20)	36 years, 67 days	9‍–‍8	
450	9 Nov 2025	International Championship	Nanjing	Wu Yize (1)	22 years, 26 days	John Higgins (26)	50 years, 175 days	10‍–‍6	
451	7 Dec 2025	UK Championship	York	Mark Selby (25)	42 years, 171 days	Judd Trump (21)	36 years, 109 days	10‍–‍8	
452	13 Dec 2025	Snooker Shoot Out	Blackpool	Alfie Burden (1)	48 years, 364 days	Stuart Bingham (7)	49 years, 206 days	1‍–‍0	
453	21 Dec 2025	Scottish Open	Edinburgh	Chris Wakelin (2)	33 years, 280 days	Chang Bingyu (1)	23 years, 135 days	9‍–‍2	
454	1 Feb 2026	German Masters	Berlin	Judd Trump (31)	36 years, 165 days	Shaun Murphy (16)	43 years, 175 days	10‍–‍4	
455	8 Feb 2026	World Grand Prix	Hong Kong	Zhao Xintong (4)	28 years, 311 days	Zhang Anda (3)	34 years, 45 days	10‍–‍6	
456	22 Feb 2026	Players Championship	Telford	Zhao Xintong (5)	28 years, 325 days	John Higgins (27)	50 years, 280 days	10‍–‍7	
457	1 Mar 2026	Welsh Open	Llandudno	Barry Hawkins (5)	46 years, 312 days	Jack Lisowski (7)	34 years, 249 days	9‍–‍5	
458	22 Mar 2026	World Open	Yushan	Thepchaiya Un-Nooh (2)	40 years, 338 days	Ronnie O'Sullivan (25)	50 years, 107 days	10‍–‍7	
459	5 Apr 2026	Tour Championship	Manchester	Zhao Xintong (6)	29 years, 2 days	Judd Trump (22)	36 years, 228 days	10‍–‍3	
460	4 May 2026	World Snooker Championship	Sheffield	Wu Yize (2)	22 years, 202 days	Shaun Murphy (17)	43 years, 267 days	18‍–‍17	
461	15 Jul 2026	Championship League	Leicester	Jak Jones (1)	32 years, 351 days	David Gilbert (5)	45 years, 33 days	3‍–‍2	
462	16 Aug 2026	China Open	Taiyuan	Mark Selby (26)	43 years, 58 days	Noppon Saengkham (2)	34 years, 32 days	10‍–‍6	
463	29 Aug 2026	Wuhan Open	Wuhan	Chang Bingyu (1)	24 years, 21 days	Zhao Xintong (1)	29 years, 148 days	10‍–‍7	
464	6 Sep 2026	British Open	Cheltenham	Jak Jones (2)	33 years, 39 days	Mark Selby (14)	43 years, 79 days	10‍–‍6	
465	13 Sep 2026	English Open	Brentwood	Ali Carter (7)	47 years, 50 days	Mark Williams (18)	51 years, 176 days	9‍–‍6	
466	4 Oct 2026	Shenzhen Open	Shenzhen	Wu Yize (3)	22 years, 355 days	Yuan Sijun (1)	26 years, 128 days	10‍–‍5	
467	25 Oct 2026	Northern Ireland Open	Belfast	Kyren Wilson (11)	34 years, 306 days	Jak Jones (2)	33 years, 88 days	9‍–‍2	
468	7 Nov 2026	International Championship	Nanjing	Kyren Wilson (12)	34 years, 319 days	John Higgins (28)	51 years, 173 days	10‍–‍8	

Notes:

# – Ranking tournament number.
Numbers in parentheses in the Winner and Runner-up columns refer to the number of times the player had been a winner or runner-up at that time.
Score – Frame score in the final.
RR – Final stage was a round-robin.
Ref. – Reference.

== See also ==
- List of world number-one snooker players
