= 1989 Grand Prix =

1989 Grand Prix may refer to:

- 1989 Grand Prix (snooker)
- 1989 Grand Prix (tennis)
