= 1982 Junior Pot Black =

Junior Pot Black 82
Tournament information
- Dates: mid 1982 (Broadcast 23 August – 1 September 1982)
- Venue: Pebble Mill Studios
- City: Birmingham
- Country: England
- Format: Non-Ranking event
- Winner's share: £250
- Highest break: (England) John Parrott (56)

Final
- Champion: (England) John Parrott
- Runner-up: (England) John Keers
- Score: 169–70

The 1982 Junior Pot Black was the second staging of the junior snooker tournament which was held in the Pebble Mill Studios in Birmingham. 8 young players were competing in a knockout format reduced from 12 from 1981. The matches are one-frame shoot-outs and a 2 frame aggregate score in the final.

Broadcasts were on BBC2 and started at 19:00 on Monday 23 August 1982 running 7 shows in 10 days. Alan Weeks presented the programme with Ted Lowe as commentator and John Williams as referee.

As the previous year's champion Dean Reynolds turned professional, The only players from the last series competing this year were John Parrott, Neal Foulds, John Keers and Jonathan White and Parrott and Keers met in the final which Parrott won 169–70.

== Main draw ==
Quarter-finals 23–26 August 1982		Semi-finals 30 and 31 August 1982		Final 1 September 1982
(England) Neal Foulds	0
(Republic of Ireland) Paddy Browne	1	(Republic of Ireland) Paddy Browne	0
(England) John Keers	1	(England) John Keers	1
(England) Jonathan White	0			(England) John Keers	0
(England) Steve Ventham	1			(England) John Parrott	1
(England) Chris Hamson	0	(England) Steve Ventham	0
(England) John Parrott	1	(England) John Parrott	1
(England) Mark Lockwood	0

Match dates of transmission

Player 1	Player 2	Broadcast Date
(England) Neal Foulds	(Republic of Ireland) Paddy Browne	23 August 1982
(England) Steve Ventham	(England) Chris Hansom	24 August 1982
(England) John Keers	(England) Jonathan White	25 August 1982
(England) John Parrott	(England) Mark Lockwood	26 August 1982
(England) John Keers	(Republic of Ireland) Paddy Browne	30 August 1982
(England) John Parrott	(England) Steve Ventham	31 August 1982
(England) John Parrott	(England) John Keers	1 September 1982
