= 1995 Thailand Classic =

Thailand Classic
Tournament information
- Dates: 30 September – 7 October 1995
- Venue: Novotel
- City: Bangkok
- Country: Thailand
- Organisation: WPBSA
- Format: Ranking event
- Total prize fund: £230,000
- Winner's share: £40,000
- Highest break: Nigel Bond (ENG) (123)

Final
- Champion: John Parrott (ENG)
- Runner-up: Nigel Bond (ENG)
- Score: 9–6

The 1995 Singha Thailand Classic was a professional ranking snooker tournament that took place between 30 September to 7 October 1995 at the Riverside Montien Hotel in Bangkok, Thailand.

John Parrott won the tournament, defeating Nigel Bond 9–6 in the final. The defending champion Alan McManus was eliminated by John Higgins in the last 16 round.

== Prize money ==
The breakdown of prize money for this year is shown below:

Winner: £40,000
Runner-up: £22,500
Semi-final: £11,250
Quarter-final: £6,250
Last 16: £3,125
Last 32: £2,075

Pre-televised highest break: £4,000
Televised highest break: £5,000

Total: £230,000

== Wildcard round ==
Match		Score	
WC1	Michael Duffy (NIR)	5–4	Phaitoon Phonbun (THA)
WC2	Rom Surin (THA)	5–4	Paul Wykes (ENG)
WC3	Young Kien Foot (MAS)	5–4	Matthew Stevens (WAL)
WC4	Mark Johnston-Allen (ENG)	5–1	Wong Jan (THA)

== Main draw ==
Last 32; Best of 9 frames
(England) John Parrott	5
(Northern Ireland) Dennis Taylor	1
(Malta) Tony Drago	5
(Malaysia) Young Kien Foot	0
(Scotland) John Higgins	5
(England) Andy Hicks	2
(Scotland) Alan McManus	5
(England) Dean Reynolds	3
(Scotland) Stephen Hendry	5
(England) Anthony Hamilton	4
(England) Peter Ebdon	5
(England) Gary Wilkinson	2
(Wales) Terry Griffiths	5
(Thailand) Rom Surin	3
(Wales) Darren Morgan	5
(England) Brian Morgan	1
(England) Nigel Bond	5
(Northern Ireland) Michael Duffy	1
(England) Steve Davis	5
(Republic of Ireland) Fergal O'Brien	3
(Northern Ireland) Joe Swail	5
(Republic of Ireland) Ken Doherty	2
(England) Jimmy White	5
(Canada) Alain Robidoux	3
(New Zealand) Dene O'Kane	5
(England) David Roe	3
(England) Mark Johnston-Allen	5
(England) Ronnie O'Sullivan	4
(England) Dave Finbow	5
(England) Dave Harold	2
(Thailand) James Wattana	5
(Wales) Anthony Davies	4

Last 16; Best of 9 frames
(England) John Parrott	5
(Malta) Tony Drago	4
(Scotland) John Higgins	5
(Scotland) Alan McManus	4
(Scotland) Stephen Hendry	5
(England) Peter Ebdon	4
(Wales) Terry Griffiths	5
(Wales) Darren Morgan	0
(England) Nigel Bond	5
(England) Steve Davis	0
(Northern Ireland) Joe Swail	5
(England) Jimmy White	3
(New Zealand) Dene O'Kane	5
(England) Mark Johnston-Allen	4
(England) Dave Finbow	5
(Thailand) James Wattana	4

Quarter-finals; Best of 9 frames
(England) John Parrott	5
(Scotland) John Higgins	3
(Scotland) Stephen Hendry	5
(Wales) Terry Griffiths	0
(England) Nigel Bond	5
(Northern Ireland) Joe Swail	4
(New Zealand) Dene O'Kane	5
(England) Dave Finbow	4

Semi-finals; Best of 9 frames
(England) John Parrott	5
(Scotland) Stephen Hendry	4
(England) Nigel Bond	5
(New Zealand) Dene O'Kane	1

Final; Best of 17 frames
(England) John Parrott	9
(England) Nigel Bond	6
