= 1996 European Open (snooker) =

Tournament information
- Dates: 25 February – 3 March 1996
- Venue: Mediterranean Conference Centre
- City: Valletta
- Country: Malta
- Organisation: WPBSA
- Format: Ranking event
- Winner's share: £60,000

Final
- Champion: John Parrott (ENG)
- Runner-up: Peter Ebdon (ENG)
- Score: 9–7

The 1996 European Open was a professional ranking snooker tournament that took place between 25 February to 3 March 1996 at the Mediterranean Conference Centre in Valletta, Malta.

John Parrott won the tournament, defeating Peter Ebdon 9–7 in the final. The defending champion Stephen Hendry was eliminated by Joe Swail in the last 16 round.

== Wildcard round ==
Match		Score	
WC1	Marcus Campbell (SCO)	5–2	Simon Camilleri (MLT)
WC2	Leo Fernandez (IRL)	5–3	Ray Demanuele (MLT)
WC3	Karl Payne (ENG)	5–2	Richard Webb (MLT)
WC4	Chris Scanlon (ENG)	5–1	Frans Mintoff (MLT)

== Main draw ==
Last 32; Best of 9 frames
(England) John Parrott	5
(England) Chris Scanlon	3
(Republic of Ireland) Ken Doherty	5
(Scotland) Marcus Campbell	3
(England) Dave Harold	5
(England) Ian Brumby	2
(Wales) Darren Morgan	5
(England) Karl Payne	3
(Northern Ireland) Joe Swail	5
(England) David Roe	3
(Scotland) Stephen Hendry	5
(England) Neal Foulds	1
(Wales) Anthony Davies	5
(Thailand) James Wattana	3
(England) Joe Johnson	5
(Scotland) John Higgins	0
(England) Peter Ebdon	5
(Republic of Ireland) Leo Fernandez	1
(England) Dave Finbow	5
(England) Ronnie O'Sullivan	4
(Malta) Tony Drago	5
(Northern Ireland) Dennis Taylor	2
(England) Steve James	5
(England) Jimmy White	2
(England) Andy Hicks	5
(England) Steve Davis	1
(Wales) Terry Griffiths	5
(Wales) Mark Williams	4
(Wales) Tony Chappel	5
(Scotland) Alan McManus	4
(England) Stephen Lee	5
(England) Nigel Bond	1

Last 16; Best of 9 frames
(England) John Parrott	5
(Republic of Ireland) Ken Doherty	3
(England) Dave Harold	5
(Wales) Darren Morgan	3
(Northern Ireland) Joe Swail	5
(Scotland) Stephen Hendry	3
(Wales) Anthony Davies	5
(England) Joe Johnson	1
(England) Peter Ebdon	5
(England) Dave Finbow	4
(Malta) Tony Drago	5
(England) Steve James	2
(England) Andy Hicks	5
(Wales) Terry Griffiths	0
(Wales) Tony Chappel	5
(England) Stephen Lee	3

Quarter-finals; Best of 9 frames
(England) John Parrott	5
(England) Dave Harold	1
(Northern Ireland) Joe Swail	5
(Wales) Anthony Davies	3
(England) Peter Ebdon	5
(Malta) Tony Drago	2
(England) Andy Hicks	5
(Wales) Tony Chappel	1

Semi-finals; Best of 11 frames
(England) John Parrott	6
(Northern Ireland) Joe Swail	5
(England) Peter Ebdon	6
(England) Andy Hicks	3

Final; Best of 17 frames
(England) John Parrott	9
(England) Peter Ebdon	7
