= 1984 International Open =

1984 Jameson International Open
Tournament information
- Dates: 24 September – 7 October 1984
- Venue: Eldon Square Recreation Centre
- City: Newcastle-upon-Tyne
- Country: England
- Organisation: WPBSA
- Format: Ranking event
- Winner's share: £30,000

Final
- Champion: Steve Davis (ENG)
- Runner-up: Tony Knowles (ENG)
- Score: 9–2

The 1984 International Open (officially the 1984 Jameson International Open) was a professional ranking snooker tournament that took place between 24 September to 7 October 1984 at the Eldon Square Recreation Centre in Newcastle-upon-Tyne, England.

Eugene Hughes reached the semi-finals before losing 9–3 to Steve Davis. Hughes had beaten Doug Mountjoy, Ray Reardon and Willie Thorne to reach that stage.

Defending champion Steve Davis won the tournament, defeating Tony Knowles 9–2 in the final.

== Main draw ==
Last 32; Best of 9 frames
1	Steve Davis (ENG)	5
John Campbell (AUS)	1
16	David Taylor (ENG)	5
Wayne Jones (WAL)	4
8	Terry Griffiths (WAL)	5
Neal Foulds (ENG)	3
9	Alex Higgins (NIR)	5
Eddie Sinclair (SCO)	1
5	Ray Reardon (WAL)	5
Les Dodd (ENG)	4
15	Doug Mountjoy (WAL)	1
Eugene Hughes (IRL)	5
4	Kirk Stevens (CAN)	1
Marcel Gauvreau (CAN)	5
12	Willie Thorne (ENG)	5
Dene O'Kane (NZL)	3
3	Cliff Thorburn (CAN)	0
John Virgo (ENG)	5
13	John Spencer (ENG)	2
Silvino Francisco (RSA)	5
6	Eddie Charlton (AUS)	1
Joe Johnson (ENG)	5
11	Dennis Taylor (NIR)	5
Danny Fowler (ENG)	0
7	Jimmy White (ENG)	5
Rex Williams (ENG)	3
10	Tony Meo (ENG)	5
Murdo MacLeod (SCO)	1
2	Tony Knowles (ENG)	5
Dean Reynolds (ENG)	1
14	Bill Werbeniuk (CAN)	2
Steve Newbury (WAL)	5

Last 16; Best of 9 frames
1	(England) Steve Davis	5
16	(England) David Taylor	1
8	(Wales) Terry Griffiths	4
9	(Northern Ireland) Alex Higgins	5
5	(Wales) Ray Reardon	1
(Republic of Ireland) Eugene Hughes	5
(Canada) Marcel Gauvreau	3
12	(England) Willie Thorne	5
(England) John Virgo	2
(South Africa) Silvino Francisco	5
(England) Joe Johnson	2
11	(Northern Ireland) Dennis Taylor	5
7	(England) Jimmy White	5
10	(England) Tony Meo	1
2	(England) Tony Knowles	5
(Wales) Steve Newbury	4

Quarter-finals; Best of 9 frames
1	(England) Steve Davis	5
9	(Northern Ireland) Alex Higgins	1
(Republic of Ireland) Eugene Hughes	5
12	(England) Willie Thorne	2
(South Africa) Silvino Francisco	w/o
11	(Northern Ireland) Dennis Taylor	w/d
7	(England) Jimmy White	4
2	(England) Tony Knowles	5

Semi-finals; Best of 17 frames
1	(England) Steve Davis	9
(Republic of Ireland) Eugene Hughes	3
(South Africa) Silvino Francisco	6
2	(England) Tony Knowles	9

Final; Best of 17 frames
1	(England) Steve Davis	9
2	(England) Tony Knowles	2
