= 1984 Carlsberg Challenge =

Carlsberg Challenge
Tournament information
- Dates: 14–16 September 1984
- Venue: RTÉ Studios
- City: Dublin
- Country: Ireland
- Organisation: WPBSA
- Format: Non-ranking event
- Total prize fund: £20,000
- Winner's share: £7,500
- Highest break: Jimmy White (ENG) (97)

Final
- Champion: Jimmy White (ENG)
- Runner-up: Tony Knowles (ENG)
- Score: 9–7

The 1984 Carlsberg Challenge was a non-ranking snooker tournament, which took place between 14 and 16 September 1984. The tournament featured four professional players and was filmed in RTÉ Studios, Dublin, for broadcast on RTÉ.

Jimmy White won the tournament defeating Tony Knowles 9–7.

== Prize fund ==
The breakdown of prize money for this year is shown below:

- Winner: £7,500
- Runner-up: £5,000
- Semi-final: £3,500
- Highest break: £500
- Total: £20,000

== Main draw ==
Results are shown below:

Semi-finals; Best of 9 frames
Jimmy White (ENG)	5
Kirk Stevens (CAN)	0
Tony Knowles (ENG)	5
Alex Higgins (NIR)	3

Final; Best of 17 frames
Jimmy White (ENG)	9
Tony Knowles (ENG)	7
