= 1983 Junior Pot Black =

Junior Pot Black 83
Tournament information
- Dates: Spring 1983 (Broadcast 5–21 July 1983)
- Venue: Pebble Mill Studios
- City: Birmingham
- Country: England
- Format: Non-Ranking event
- Winner's share: £250
- Highest break: (England) John Parrott (71)

Final
- Champion: (England) John Parrott
- Runner-up: (England) Steve Ventham
- Score: 2-0

The 1983 Junior Pot Black was the third staging of the junior snooker tournament and last of the original run which was held in the Pebble Mill Studios in Birmingham. 8 young players were competing in a knockout format. The matches are one-frame shoot-outs and a 2 frame aggregate score in the final.

Broadcasts were twice weekly on BBC2 except the final which was on three times and the series started at 18:30 on Tuesday 5 July 1983. Alan Weeks presented the programme with Ted Lowe as commentator and with John Williams unavailable, Vic Bartlam took the role as referee.

The only players from the last series competing this year were the defending champion John Parrott who had just turned professional at the time of the series being broadcast, runner-up John Keers and semi-finalist Steve Ventham. Among the new players for this series was 14 year old Stephen Hendry who was making his television debut. Hendry beat Nicolas Pearce in the first match before losing to Ventham in the semi-final who then lost to Parrott in a two frame aggregate final giving him his second consecutive title.

== Main draw ==
Quarter-finals 5-6, 12–13 July 1983		Semi-finals 19 and 20 July 1983		Final 21 July 1983
(England) Mark Thompson	1
(England) John Keers	0	(England) Mark Thompson	0
(England) John Parrott	1	(England) John Parrott	1
(England) Brian Rowswell	0			(England) John Parrott	1
(Scotland) Stephen Hendry	1			(England) Steve Ventham	0
(England) Nick Pearce	0	(Scotland) Stephen Hendry	0
(England) Steve Ventham	1	(England) Steve Ventham	1
(England) Chris Hamson	0

Match dates of transmission

Player 1	Player 2	Broadcast Date
(England) Mark Thompson	(England) John Keers	5 July 1983
(Scotland) Stephen Hendry	(England) Nick Pearce	6 July 1983
(England) John Parrott	(England) Brian Rowswell	12 July 1983
(England) Steve Ventham	(England) Chris Hamson	13 July 1983
(England) John Parrott	(England) Mark Thompson	19 July 1983
(England) Steve Ventham	(Scotland) Stephen Hendry	20 July 1983
(England) John Parrott	(England) Steve Ventham	21 July 1983
