= 1989 Grand Prix (snooker) =

Rothmans Grand Prix
Tournament information
- Dates: 9–22 October 1989
- Venue: Hexagon Theatre
- City: Reading
- Country: England
- Organisation: WPBSA
- Format: Ranking event
- Total prize fund: £350,000
- Winner's share: £70,000
- Highest break: Willie Thorne (ENG) (141) (non TV); Joe Johnson (ENG) (138) (TV); Jimmy White (ENG) (138) (TV)

Final
- Champion: Steve Davis (ENG)
- Runner-up: Dean Reynolds (ENG)
- Score: 10–0

The 1989 Rothmans Grand Prix was a professional ranking snooker tournament held at the Hexagon Theatre in Reading, England.

Steve Davis won in the final 10–0 against Dean Reynolds to win his last Grand Prix title. This is the only whitewash final in the history of the tournament and only one of four whitewashes in any two-session final. This would also be Davis last ranking title as the World Number 1 player as he would lose his place at the end of the season to Stephen Hendry.

== Main draw ==
Last 64; Best of 9 frames
(England) Steve Davis	5
(England) Steve Duggan	1
(England) Neal Foulds	5
(England) Nigel Gilbert	1
(England) Tony Meo	5
(Scotland) Eddie Sinclair	2
(England) Jason Smith	5
(South Africa) Peter Francisco	3
(England) Tony Knowles	5
(England) Ray Edmonds	4
(England) Martin Clark	5
(Wales) Colin Roscoe	3
(Canada) Cliff Thorburn	5
(England) Steve Meakin	3
(England) Tony Jones	5
(New Zealand) Dene O'Kane	2
(England) Mike Hallett	5
(England) Mark Johnston-Allen	1
(England) Danny Fowler	5
(England) David Roe	4
(Canada) Alain Robidoux	5
(England) Steve James	2
(Republic of Ireland) Eugene Hughes	5
(Wales) Mark Bennett	2
(England) Joe Johnson	5
(Wales) Darren Morgan	2
(Northern Ireland) Alex Higgins	5
(England) David Gilbert	3
(England) Jimmy White	5
(England) Steve Campbell	0
(England) Jim Chambers	5
(England) Barry West	4
(Scotland) Stephen Hendry	5
(England) Graham Cripsey	2
(England) Nigel Bond	5
(Canada) Bob Chaperon	4
(Wales) Doug Mountjoy	w/o
(Canada) Jim Wych	w/d
(Canada) Mario Morra	5
(Wales) Wayne Jones	4
(England) Willie Thorne	5
(Northern Ireland) Jack McLaughlin	2
(Thailand) James Wattana	5
(South Africa) Silvino Francisco	2
(England) Paul Gibson	5
(Wales) Terry Griffiths	2
(England) Les Dodd	5
(England) Rex Williams	3
(Northern Ireland) Dennis Taylor	5
(Australia) John Campbell	3
(England) Brian Rowswell	5
(Wales) Cliff Wilson	4
(England) John Virgo	5
(England) Steve Longworth	4
(Wales) Steve Newbury	5
(England) Bill Oliver	4
(England) Dean Reynolds	5
(England) Vic Harris	0
(Australia) Warren King	5
(Australia) Eddie Charlton	0
(England) John Parrott	5
(Republic of Ireland) Stephen Murphy	1
(England) Gary Wilkinson	5
(Malta) Tony Drago	1

Last 32; Best of 9 frames
(England) Steve Davis	5
(England) Neal Foulds	4
(England) Tony Meo	3
(England) Jason Smith	5
(England) Tony Knowles	5
(England) Martin Clark	2
(Canada) Cliff Thorburn	4
(England) Tony Jones	5
(England) Mike Hallett	3
(England) Danny Fowler	5
(Canada) Alain Robidoux	5
(Republic of Ireland) Eugene Hughes	1
(England) Joe Johnson	5
(Northern Ireland) Alex Higgins	2
(England) Jimmy White	5
(England) Jim Chambers	1
(Scotland) Stephen Hendry	5
(England) Nigel Bond	1
(Wales) Doug Mountjoy	5
(Canada) Mario Morra	0
(England) Willie Thorne	3
(Thailand) James Wattana	5
(England) Paul Gibson	5
(England) Les Dodd	4
(Northern Ireland) Dennis Taylor	5
(England) Brian Rowswell	2
(England) John Virgo	0
(Wales) Steve Newbury	5
(England) Dean Reynolds	5
(Australia) Warren King	3
(England) John Parrott	5
(England) Gary Wilkinson	1

Last 16; Best of 9 frames
(England) Steve Davis	5
(England) Jason Smith	1
(England) Tony Knowles	5
(England) Tony Jones	4
(England) Danny Fowler	5
(Canada) Alain Robidoux	4
(England) Joe Johnson	5
(England) Jimmy White	0
(Scotland) Stephen Hendry	3
(Wales) Doug Mountjoy	5
(Thailand) James Wattana	5
(England) Paul Gibson	3
(Northern Ireland) Dennis Taylor	5
(Wales) Steve Newbury	1
(England) Dean Reynolds	5
(England) John Parrott	2

Quarter-finals; Best of 9 frames
(England) Steve Davis	5
(England) Tony Knowles	2
(England) Danny Fowler	5
(England) Joe Johnson	4
(Wales) Doug Mountjoy	2
(Thailand) James Wattana	5
(Northern Ireland) Dennis Taylor	3
(England) Dean Reynolds	5

Semi-finals; Best of 17 frames
(England) Steve Davis	9
(England) Danny Fowler	2
(Thailand) James Wattana	8
(England) Dean Reynolds	9

Final; Best of 19 frames
(England) Steve Davis	10
(England) Dean Reynolds	0

== Final ==
Final: Best of 19 frames. Referee: John Street; Hexagon Theatre, Reading, England, 22 October 1989.
Steve Davis; England	10–0	Dean Reynolds; England
108–0, 75–39, 72–46, 67–9, 66–25 (52), 98–7 (82), 63–34, 86–22, 67–28, 69–13
82	Highest break	
0	Century breaks	0
2	50+ breaks	0

== Century breaks ==
- 141, 102 – Willie Thorne
- 138 – Joe Johnson
- 138 – Jimmy White
- 138 – Gary Wilkinson
- 136 – Cliff Wilson
- 134, 130, 129 – Steve Davis
- 130, 106 – Stephen Hendry
- 130 – Tony Jones
- 117, 103 – Dean Reynolds
- 115 – Steve Meakin
- 113, 103 – Danny Fowler
- 111 – Mick Price
- 110 – Mike Hallett
- 104 – Dennis Taylor
- 103 – James Wattana
- 102 – Martin Clark
