= 1983 Scottish Masters =

Tournament information
- Dates: 22–25 September 1983
- Venue: Skean Dhu Hotel
- City: Glasgow
- Country: Scotland
- Organisation: WPBSA
- Format: Non-ranking event
- Total prize fund: £26,000
- Winner's share: £10,000
- Highest break: Steve Davis (ENG) (137)

Final
- Champion: Steve Davis (ENG)
- Runner-up: Tony Knowles (ENG)
- Score: 9–6

The 1983 Langs Supreme Scottish Masters was a professional non-ranking snooker tournament that took place between 22 and 25 September 1983 at the Skean Dhu Hotel in Glasgow, Scotland.

Steve Davis beat Murdo MacLeod 5–1 in the quarter-finals, including breaks of 102 and 137. Alex Higgins beat Jimmy White 5–3, after White had won the first two frames, and Tony Knowles beat Tony Meo 5–4 after winning the last three frames.

Steve Davis won the tournament by defeating Tony Knowles 9–6 in the final, finishing the match with a break of 114 and winning the first prize of £10,000.

== Tournament draw ==
Quarter-finals; Best of 9 frames
Steve Davis (ENG)	5
Murdo MacLeod (SCO)	1
Alex Higgins (NIR)	5
Jimmy White (ENG)	3
Tony Knowles (ENG)	5
Tony Meo (ENG)	4
Cliff Thorburn (CAN)	5
Terry Griffiths (WAL)	1

Semi-finals; Best of 11 frames
(England) Steve Davis	6
(Northern Ireland) Alex Higgins	2
(England) Tony Knowles	6
(Canada) Cliff Thorburn	2

Final; Best of 17 Frames
(England) Steve Davis	9
(England) Tony Knowles	6
