= 1981 Junior Pot Black =

Junior Pot Black 81
Tournament information
- Dates: April 1981 (Broadcast 1 May – 19 June 1981)
- Venue: Pebble Mill Studios
- City: Birmingham
- Country: England
- Format: Non-Ranking event
- Highest break: ???

Final
- Champion: (England) Dean Reynolds
- Runner-up: (New Zealand) Dene O'Kane
- Score: 151–79

The 1981 Junior Pot Black was the first staging of the junior snooker tournament which was held in the Pebble Mill Studios in Birmingham. 12 young players were competing in a qualifying round before 6 of the winners go on to the round-robin stage of 2 groups of three. The matches are one-frame shoot-outs and 2 frame aggregate scores in the final.

Broadcasts were on BBC2 and started at 18:55 on Friday 1 May 1981 Alan Weeks presented the programme with Ted Lowe as commentator and John Williams as referee.

Notable players in the first championship include John Parrott, Neal Foulds and the two finalists Dean Reynolds and Dene O'Kane. Reynolds won the title 151–79 and soon turned professional afterwards.

== Main draw ==
=== Qualifying round ===
Player 1	Score	Player 2	Broadcast Date
(Republic of Ireland) Paul Ennis	40–54	(Australia) Greg Jenkins	1 May 1981
(England) Tony Pyle	64–55	(England) Danny Adds	1 May 1981
(England) Jonathan White	0–1	(England) John Keers	8 May 1981
(England) Neal Foulds	0–1	(England) Dean Reynolds	8 May 1981
(England) John Parrott	1–0	(Wales) Mark Bennett	15 May 1981
(England) Terry Whitthread	0–1	(New Zealand) Dene O'Kane	15 May 1981

=== Group 1 ===
Player 1	Score	Player 2	Broadcast Date
(Australia) Greg Jenkins	1–0	(England) John Keers	22 May 1981
(Australia) Greg Jenkins	0–1	(England) John Parrott	29 May 1981
(England) John Keers	0–1	(England) John Parrott	5 June 1981

=== Group 2 ===
Player 1	Score	Player 2	Broadcast Date
(England) Tony Pyle	0–1	(England) Dean Reynolds	22 May 1981
(England) Tony Pyle	0–1	(New Zealand) Dene O'Kane	29 May 1981
(England) Dean Reynolds	0–1	(New Zealand) Dene O'Kane	5 June 1981

=== Knockout stage ===
Semi-finals (12 June 1981)
(New Zealand) Dene O'Kane	1
(Australia) Greg Jenkins	0
(England) Dean Reynolds	1
(England) John Parrott	0

Final (19 June 1981)
(New Zealand) Dene O'Kane	79
(England) Dean Reynolds	151
