= 1984 Tolly Cobbold Classic =

Tolly Cobbold Classic
Tournament information
- Dates: 21–23 February 1984
- Venue: Corn Exchange
- City: Ipswich
- Country: England
- Organisation: WPBSA
- Format: Non-ranking event
- Winner's share: £7,000

Final
- Champion: (England) Steve Davis
- Runner-up: (England) Tony Knowles
- Score: 8–2

The 1984 Tolly Cobbold Classic was the sixth and final edition of the professional invitational snooker tournament, which took place in February 1984 at the Corn Exchange in Ipswich, England.

Steve Davis won the tournament beating Tony Knowles 8–2 in the final.

== Main draw ==
Quarter-finals; Best of 9 frames
(England) Steve Davis	5
(England) Willie Thorne	2
(Canada) Kirk Stevens	5
(Australia) Eddie Charlton	3
(England) Tony Knowles	5
(England) Jimmy White	1
(Canada) Cliff Thorburn	5
(England) Tony Meo	4

Semi-finals; Best of 9 frames
(England) Steve Davis	5
(Canada) Kirk Stevens	4
(England) Tony Knowles	5
(Canada) Cliff Thorburn	3

Final; Best of 15 frames
(England) Steve Davis	8
(England) Tony Knowles	2
