= 1983 World Team Classic =

State Express World Team Classic
Tournament information
- Dates: 22–30 October 1983
- Venue: Hexagon Theatre
- City: Reading
- Country: England
- Format: Non-ranking event
- Total prize fund: £60,000
- Winner's share: £20,000
- Highest break: Cliff Thorburn, 108

Final
- Champion: England
- Runner-up: Wales
- Score: 4–2 (matches)

The 1983 World Team Classic sponsored by State Express was a team snooker tournament played at the Hexagon Theatre in Reading. All matches including the final were played in the best of six matches with a tie break frame between the captains if it stayed 3-3. England regained the title beating Wales 4–2.

The highest break of the tournament was 108, by Cliff Thorburn.

== Main draw ==
=== Teams ===
Country	Player 1 (Captain)	Player 2	Player 3
Canada	Cliff Thorburn	Kirk Stevens	Bill Werbeniuk
England	Steve Davis	Tony Knowles	Tony Meo
Wales	Ray Reardon	Terry Griffiths	Doug Mountjoy
Northern Ireland	Alex Higgins	Dennis Taylor	Tommy Murphy
Australia	Eddie Charlton	John Campbell	Warren King
Scotland	Eddie Sinclair	Ian Black	Murdo MacLeod

=== Group A ===
Team 1	Score	Team 2	Date
Canada	3–4	Wales	
Canada	4–2	Australia	
Wales	4–0	Australia	

=== Group B ===
Team 1	Score	Team 2	Date
England	4–1	Northern Ireland	
Northern Ireland	4–3	Scotland	
England	4–0	Scotland	

=== Semi-finals ===
Team 1	Score	Team 2	Date
Wales	4–1	Northern Ireland	
Canada	2–4	England	

== Final ==
Final: Best of 7 matches. Referee: Hexagon Theatre, Reading, England. 30 October 1983.
England; Steve Davis, Tony Knowles, Tony Meo	4–2	Wales; Ray Reardon, Terry Griffiths, Doug Mountjoy
Davis v Mountjoy: 16–103 (67), 19–94, 0–1; Meo v Reardon: 68–38, 59–54, 1–1; Knowles v Griffiths: 115–0, 14–93, 115 (58, 49)–8, 2–1; Knowles v Mountjoy: 48–80, 59–26, 94–48, 3–1; Meo v Griffiths: 31–77, 40–64, 3–2; Davis v Reardon: 86–34, 81–15, 4–2
	Highest break	
	Century breaks	
	50+ breaks	
