= Tony Knowles (snooker player) =

English snooker player

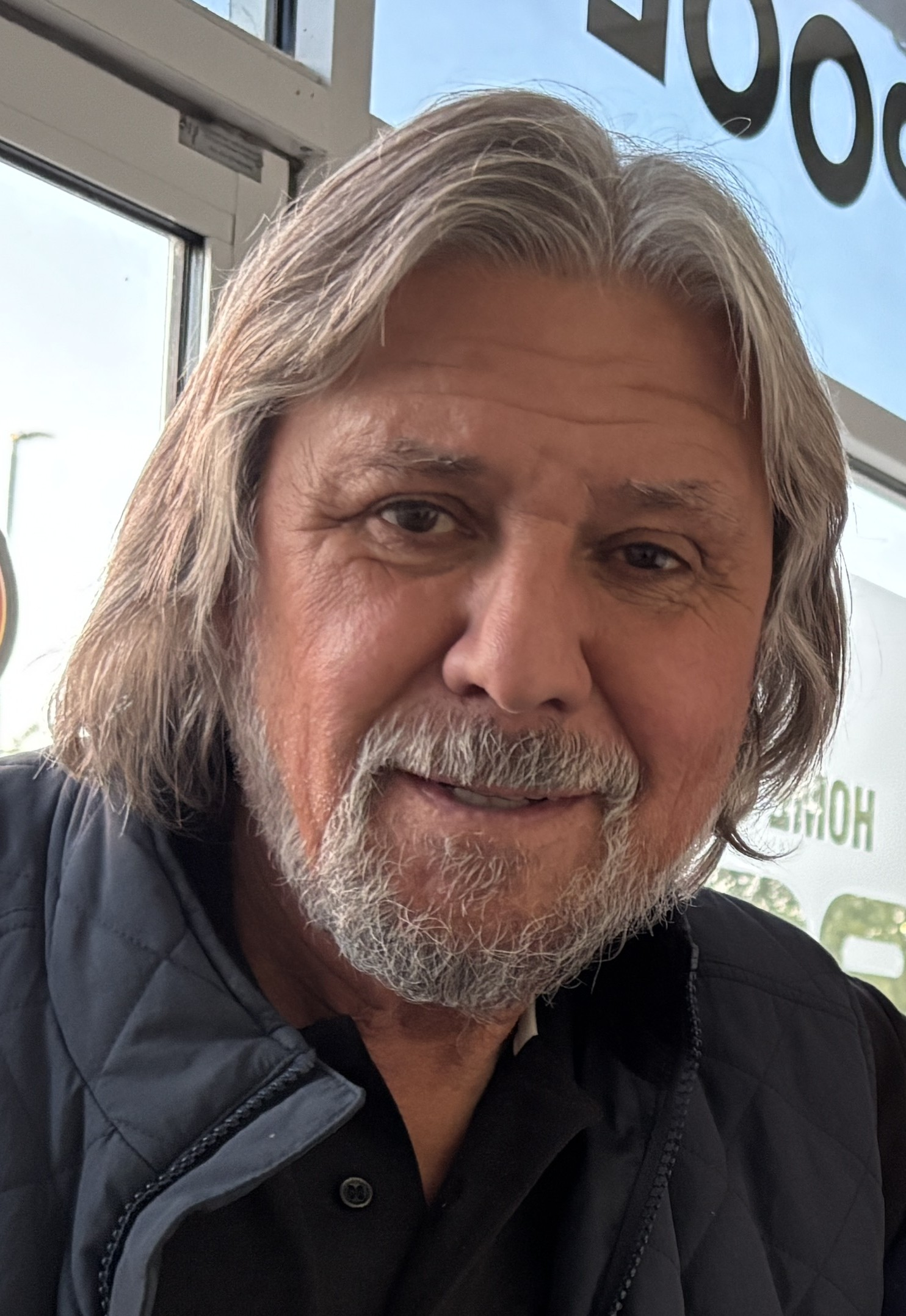
- Knowles in 2026

Personal information
- Born: 13 June 1955 (age 71) Bolton, Lancashire, England

Sport
- Country: England
- Sport: Snooker
- Professional: 1980–1997, 1998–2001
- Highest ranking: 2 (1984/85)

Tournament wins
- Ranking: 2

Anthony Knowles (born 13 June 1955) is an English former professional snooker player. He won the 1982 International Open and the 1983 Professional Players Tournament, and was a three times semi-finalist in the World Professional Snooker Championship in the 1980s. His highest world ranking was second, in the 1984/85 season.

Knowles was the British under-19 snooker champion in 1972 and 1974. He turned professional in 1980, and surprisingly defeated the defending champion Steve Davis 10–1 in the first round of the 1982 World Snooker Championship. In 1984, tabloid stories about his personal life were published, and he was fined £5,000 by the World Professional Billiards and Snooker Association for bringing the game into disrepute. His other tournament victories included the 1984 Australian Masters and, as part of the England team with Davis and Tony Meo, the 1983 World Team Classic.

== Career ==
Tony Knowles was born in Bolton on 13 June 1955. He began playing snooker at the age of 9 on the tables at the Tonge Moor Conservative Club, which was run by his father, Kevin. He went on to win the UK Junior Championship twice, in 1972 (against Matt Gibson) and in 1974. His application to the World Professional Billiards and Snooker Association (WPBSA) to become a professional player was accepted in 1980, after a rejection in November 1979. He did not win a match in his first year, before progressing through two qualifying rounds to reach the first round of the 1981 World Snooker Championship where he lost 8–10 to Graham Miles. He reached the quarter-finals of the 1981 UK Championship by eliminating Geoff Foulds, Fred Davis and Doug Mountjoy from the competition before being defeated 5–9 by Terry Griffiths. Later that season, Knowles gained attention when he won 10–1 against defending champion Steve Davis in the first round of the 1982 World Snooker Championship, after staying out late at a nightclub following the first day's play when he had built an 8–1 lead. He defeated Miles 13–7 in the second round, before losing 11–13 to Eddie Charlton in the quarter-finals.

In the 1982–83 snooker season, he followed up his performance in the World Championship by winning the 1982 International Open with a 9–6 victory against David Taylor. He had eliminated Eddie Sinclair 5–2 in the first round, Ray Reardon by the same score in round two, Cliff Wilson 5–4 in the quarter-finals, and Kirk Stevens 9–3 in the semi-finals. In the final, he led Taylor 5–3 after the first session, after the pair had been level at 2–2. He compiled a break of 114, the highest of the tournament, to win the ninth frame, before Taylor claimed the next two frames to leave Knowles one ahead at 6–5. Breaks of 63 and 43 in the next two frames saw Knowles restore a three-frame advantage. Taylor made a break of 74 to win the 14th frame, but Knowles secured his first major title by claiming the 15th frame with a break of 76. It was the first tournament apart from the World Snooker Championship to count in the snooker world rankings.

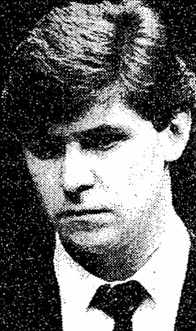
Knowles in 1986

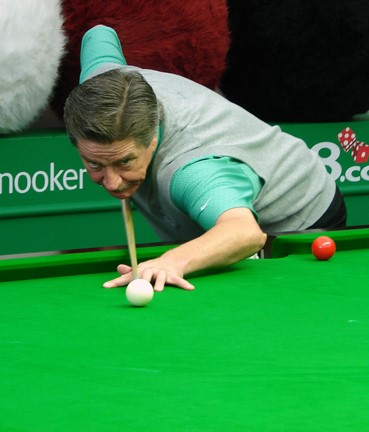
Cliff Thorburn (pictured in 2007) defeated Knowles in the deciding frame of their 1983 World Snooker Championship semi-final match.

He won only one match in four tournaments between the 1982 International Open and the 1983 World Snooker Championship. At the World Championship, he progressed to the semi-finals by defeating Miles, Reardon (the second seed), and Tony Meo. In the semi-final he led Cliff Thorburn 15–13 before losing 15–16 in the deciding frame after Thorburn fluked the final red ball and went on to take the frame. He moved to fourth place in the 1983/1984 world rankings.

The next season, he defeated Meo and Thorburn to reach the final of the 1983 Scottish Masters, which he lost 6–9 to Davis. Having failed to successfully defend the International Open title, losing 4–5 to John Spencer in the second round, Knowles started the 1983 Professional Players Tournament with a 5–1 win against Paul Medati and a 5–4 defeat of Rex Williams, then a 5–0 whitewash of Silvino Francisco. The same day as his match against Francisco, Knowles won 5–3 against John Campbell in the quarter-finals, after losing the opening two frames. In the semi-final, Knowles and Willie Thorne were level at 4–4 after the first session, with Knowles going on to prevail 9–7. In the final, he faced Joe Johnson and established a 6–1 lead, which Johnson reduced slightly to 6–2 by winning the last frame of the first session with the tournament's highest break, 135. Johnson was two frames behind at 4–6 and 5–7, but Knowles went three frames up with four to play at 8–5. Johnson won three successive frames to equalise at 8–8. In the deciding frame, Knowles won on the final pink ball to take the title.

Just before the 1984 World Snooker Championship, Knowles appeared in a series of three articles in tabloid newspaper The Sun, in which he boasted of his sexual adventures, describing himself as "the hottest pot in snooker" and was dismissive of most other competitors in the tournament. He received £25,000 from the newspaper for the articles, and was subsequently fined £5,000 by the WPBSA for bringing the game into disrepute. He lost 7–10 to John Parrott in the first round.

At the start of the 1984–85 snooker season, he won the 1984 Australian Masters by defeating John Virgo 7–3 in the final, and was the runner-up, 7–9 to Jimmy White, at the 1984 Carlsberg Challenge. He was the losing finalist to Davis, by a margin of 2–9, at both the 1984 International Open and the 1985 English Professional Championship. He reached the 1985 World Snooker Championship semi-final where he was eliminated 5–16 by Dennis Taylor Having earlier in the tournament compiled a break of 137 - missing the final black for a 144 total clearance against Jim White in their quarter final..

He reached two ranking tournament semi-finals, in the 1985–86 snooker season, at the Grand Prix and the World Championship, and the semi-finals of the Masters, but an inconsistent season included losses to lower-ranked players such as Williams, Jim Wych, and Patsy Fagan. The following year, he dropped from fourth to tenth in the rankings, with a semi-final place at the 1987 British Open the furthest he reached in a ranking tournament in a season that included a 6–10 first round defeat by Mike Hallett at the 1987 World Snooker Championship.

He was ranked 21st for the 1990/1991 season, the first time he had not been in the top sixteen since 1982/1983 after a season where he only reached one quarter-final, at the 1989 Grand Prix. At the 1991 Dubai Classic, he defeated Gary Natale 5–1 in the qualifying competition, then Eugene Hughes 5–2, and Neal Foulds 5–0. A 5–2 win against Dennis Taylor in the quarter-final saw Knowles reach his first ranking semi-final since the 1988 Classic. He then gained his first ranking final place since the 1984 International Open by eliminating Steve James 6–2. in the semi-final. Facing reigning world champion Parrott in the final, Knowles fell 0–3 behind, but won three of the next four frames to trail 3–4 at the end of the first session. Parrott then won five consecutive frames in the next session to claim victory at 9–3.

For the 1997–98 snooker season, only the top 64 players in the rankings at the end of the previous season retained full professional status. Those who finished from 65th to 192nd, including Knowles who was 72nd, played in a new WPBSA Qualifying School series which allowed qualifiers to regain full professional status. Knowles, however, lost his first match at each of the four Qualifying School events, and so was eligible to enter only the World Championship, the Benson and Hedges Championship, and the new "UK Tour" events during the season. He finished tenth in the UK Tour standings, which meant he regained his full professional status for 1998–99 snooker season, losing it again at the end of 2000–01. He continued to play on the Challenge Tour and in World Championship qualifying.

In 2009, Knowles won the inaugural Snooker Super 6s tournament, which played as one-frame matches, with six red balls, rather than the usual fifteen reds, at the Crucible Theatre in Sheffield. He defeated Neal Foulds in the semi-final, and 13-year-old Ross Muir in the final.

He has entered competitions including World Championship qualifying, Players Tour Championship and Q School in the 21st century. In 2021, he announced that he would enter Q School in an attempt to regain his professional snooker status. He failed to regain his professional status, but reached the last 32 of event 3 of the 2021 Q School, where he lost 2–4 to Mark Lloyd.

During his professional career, Knowles reached the World Championship semi-finals on three occasions (in 1983, 1985 and 1986), but never the final. His highest ranking was second, in 1984/1985, and his highest tournament break was 139. As one of three members of the England Team alongside Davis and Meo, he was a winner of the 1983 World Team Classic, and was runner-up at the 1982 World Team Classic and 1985 World Cup. He partnered White at the 1983 World Doubles Championship, where they were the losing finalists to Davis and Meo. He was a director of the WPBSA in the early-to-mid-2000s. He manages a wine bar in the Lake District. The club in the comedy programme Phoenix Nights had a room named the "Tony Knowles Suite" after him.

== Performance and rankings timeline ==
Tournament	1978/ 79	1979/ 80	1980/ 81	1981/ 82	1982/ 83	1983/ 84	1984/ 85	1985/ 86	1986/ 87	1987/ 88	1988/ 89	1989/ 90	1990/ 91	1991/ 92	1992/ 93	1993/ 94	1994/ 95	1995/ 96	1996/ 97	1997/ 98	1998/ 99	1999/ 00	2000/ 01	2001/ 02	2002/ 03	2003/ 04	Ref.
Ranking	(Note: He was an amateur.)		(Note: New players on the Main Tour do not have a ranking.)	20	15	4	2	3	4	7	8	12	21	16	20	23	21	24	42	72 (Note: He was not on the Main Tour.)	125	94	106	123	144	248	
Ranking tournaments
British Open (Note: The event was also called the British Gold Cup (1979/1980), Yamaha Organs Trophy (1980/1981) and International Masters (1981/1982–1983/1984))	NH	Non-Ranking Event					3R	2R	SF	2R	2R	3R	3R	2R	1R	1R	2R	3R	1R	A	LQ	LQ	LQ	A	A	A	
Grand Prix (Note: The event was also called the Professional Players Tournament (1982/83–1983/1984))	Tournament Not Held				2R	W	QF	SF	QF	QF	3R	QF	2R	1R	1R	QF	2R	1R	LQ	A	LQ	LQ	LQ	A	A	A	
UK Championship	Non-Ranking Event						QF	QF	QF	3R	3R	3R	QF	1R	2R	2R	1R	2R	LQ	A	LQ	LQ	LQ	A	A	A	
China Open (Note: The event was also called the China International (1997/1998–1998/1999))	Tournament Not Held																			NR	LQ	LQ	LQ	A	A	A	
Welsh Open	Tournament Not Held													2R	3R	2R	1R	1R	LQ	A	LQ	LQ	LQ	A	A	A	
Thailand Masters (Note: The event was also called the Asian Open (1989/1990–1992/1993) and the Thailand Open (1993/1994–1996/1997))	Tournament Not Held					Non-Ranking Event				Not Held		3R	1R	3R	2R	1R	1R	1R	LQ	A	LQ	LQ	LQ	A	A	A	
Scottish Open (Note: The event was also called the International Open (1981/1982–1996/1997) and Goya Matchroom Trophy (1985/1986))	Not Held			NR	W	2R	F	2R	3R	3R	2R	3R	Not Held		2R	3R	2R	1R	LQ	A	LQ	LQ	LQ	A	A	A	
World Championship	A	A	1R	QF	SF	1R	SF	SF	1R	QF	1R	2R	2R	2R	LQ	LQ	LQ	LQ	LQ	LQ	LQ	LQ	LQ	LQ	LQ	LQ	
Non-ranking tournaments
Scottish Masters	Not Held			A	QF	F	SF	QF	QF	A	NH	A	A	A	A	A	A	A	A	A	A	A	A	A	A	A	
The Masters	A	A	A	A	A	SF	1R	SF	1R	1R	QF	QF	LQ	WR	LQ	LQ	LQ	LQ	LQ	LQ	LQ	LQ	LQ	LQ	LQ	LQ	
Malta Grand Prix	Tournament Not Held																QF	A	A	A	A	R	A	Not Held			
Irish Masters	A	A	A	A	1R	QF	SF	QF	1R	QF	1R	A	A	A	A	A	A	A	A	A	A	A	A	A	A	R	
Premier League (Note: The event was also called the Professional Snooker League (1983/1984), Matchroom League (1986/1987 to 1991/1992) and the European League (1992/1993 to 1996/1997))	Tournament Not Held					RR	Not Held		A	A	A	A	A	A	A	A	A	A	A	A	A	A	A	A	A	A	
Former ranking tournaments
Canadian Masters (Note: The event was also called the Canadian Open (1978/1979–1980/1981))	Non-Ranking			Tournament Not Held				Non-Ranking			LQ	Tournament Not Held															
Hong Kong Open (Note: The event was also called the Australian Masters (1979/1980–1987/1988) and Australian Open (1994/1995))	NH	Ranking Event									NH	1R	Tournament Not Held				Ranking		Tournament Not Held								
Classic	NH	Non-Ranking Event				QF	1R	3R	1R	SF	3R	1R	1R	1R	Tournament Not Held												
Strachan Open	Tournament Not Held													1R	MR	NR	Tournament Not Held										
Asian Classic (Note: The event was also called the Dubai Masters (1988/1989), Dubai Classic (1989/90–1994/1995) and Thailand Classic (1995/1996))	Tournament Not Held										NR	1R	2R	F	2R	LQ	LQ	LQ	LQ	Tournament Not Held							
German Open	Tournament Not Held																	LQ	LQ	A	Not Held						
Irish Open (Note: The event was also called the European Open (1988/1989–1996/1997, 2001, 2003/04))	Tournament Not Held										1R	1R	2R	1R	2R	1R	LQ	LQ	LQ	NH	1R	Not Held		A	A	A	
Malta Grand Prix	Tournament Not Held																Non-Ranking Event					LQ	NR	Not Held			
Former non-ranking tournaments
International Open (Note: The event was also called the Goya Matchroom Trophy (1985/1986))	Not Held			1R	Ranking Event								Not Held		Ranking Event												
Classic	NH	A	A	A	1R	Ranking Event									Tournament Not Held												
UK Championship	A	A	LQ	2R	QF	QF	Ranking Event																				
British Open (Note: The event was also called the British Gold Cup (1979/1980), Yamaha Organs Trophy (1980/1981) and International Masters (1981/1982–1983/1984))	NH	A	LQ	LQ	RR	RR	Ranking Event																				
Tolly Cobbold Classic	A	A	A	SF	A	F	Tournament Not Held																				
Carlsberg Challenge	Tournament Not Held						F	A	A	A	A	Tournament Not Held															
Costa Del Sol Classic	Tournament Not Held						QF	Tournament Not Held																			
Thailand Masters	Tournament Not Held					A	A	RR	A	Not Held		Ranking Event															
Hong Kong Masters	Tournament Not Held					A	A	QF	A	A	A	NH	A	A	Tournament Not Held												
Belgian Classic	Tournament Not Held							SF	Tournament Not Held																		
Australian Masters (Note: The event was also called the Hong Kong Open (1989/1990) and Australian Open (1994/1995))	NH	A	A	A	A	SF	W	1R	QF	1R	NH	R	Tournament Not Held				A	A	Tournament Not Held								
Canadian Masters (Note: The event was also called the Canadian Open (1978/1979–1980/1981))	QF	1R	1R	Tournament Not Held				QF	SF	QF	R	Tournament Not Held															
Kent Cup	Tournament Not Held								A	SF	A	A	A	NH	A	Tournament Not Held											
World Matchplay	Tournament Not Held										1R	A	A	A	A	Tournament Not Held											
English Professional Championship	Not Held		1R	Not Held			F	2R	1R	QF	2R	Tournament Not Held															
New Zealand Masters	Tournament Not Held						QF	Not Held			SF	SF	Tournament Not Held														
Norwich Union Grand Prix	Tournament Not Held										A	SF	A	Tournament Not Held													
Shoot-Out	Tournament Not Held												QF	Tournament Not Held													
Pot Black	A	A	A	A	RR	1R	A	QF	Tournament Not Held					1R	A	A	Tournament Not Held										
Pontins Professional	A	A	A	A	RR	SF	A	A	A	A	A	A	A	A	QF	SF	A	A	A	A	A	A	Tournament Not Held				
World Seniors Masters	Tournament Not Held																					1R	Tournament Not Held				

Performance Table Legend
LQ	lost in the qualifying draw	#R	lost in the early rounds of the tournament (WR = Wildcard round, RR = Round robin)	QF	lost in the quarter-finals
SF	lost in the semi-finals	F	lost in the final	W	won the tournament
DNQ	did not qualify for the tournament	A	did not participate in the tournament	WD	withdrew from the tournament

NH / Not Held	means an event was not held.
NR / Non-Ranking Event	means an event is/was no longer a ranking event.
R / Ranking Event	means an event is/was a ranking event.

== Career finals ==
=== Ranking finals: 4 (2 titles) ===
Ranking finals
Outcome	No.	Year	Championship	Opponent in the final	Score
Winner	1.	1982	International Open	(England) David Taylor	9–6
Winner	2.	1983	Professional Players Tournament	(England) Joe Johnson	9–8
Runner-up	1.	1984	International Open	(England) Steve Davis	2–9
Runner-up	2.	1991	Dubai Classic	(England) John Parrott	3–9

=== Non-ranking finals: 6 (2 titles) ===
Non-ranking finals
Outcome	No.	Year	Championship	Opponent in the final	Score	Ref.
Runner-up	1.	1983	Scottish Masters	(England) Steve Davis	6–9	
Runner-up	2.	1984	Tolly Cobbold Classic	(England) Steve Davis	2–8	
Winner	1.	1984	Australian Masters	(England) John Virgo	7–3	
Runner-up	3.	1984	Carlsberg Challenge	(England) Jimmy White	7–9	
Runner-up	4.	1985	English Professional Championship	(England) Steve Davis	2–9	
Winner	2.	2009	Snooker Super 6's	(Scotland) Ross Muir	1–0	

=== Team finals: 4 (1 title) ===
Team finals
Outcome	No.	Year	Championship	Team/partner	Opponent(s) in the final	Score	Ref.
Runner-up	1.	1982	World Team Classic	England	Canada	2–4	
Winner	1.	1983	World Team Classic	England	Wales	4–2	
Runner-up	2.	1983	World Doubles Championship	Jimmy White (ENG)	Steve Davis (ENG); Tony Meo (ENG)	2–4	
Runner-up	3.	1985	World Cup	England A	Ireland	7–9	

=== Pro-am finals: 3 (1 title) ===
Pro-Am finals
Outcome	No.	Year	Championship	Opponent in the final	Score	Ref.
Runner-up	1.	1978	Warners Open	(England) John Spencer	4–7	
Winner	1.	1979	Pontins Spring Open	(England) Dave Martin	7–0	
Runner-up	1.	1990	Dutch Open	(England) Peter Ebdon	4–6	

=== Amateur finals: 2 (2 titles) ===
Amateur finals
Outcome	No.	Year	Championship	Opponent in the final	Score	Ref.
Winner	1.	1972	British Under-19 Championship	Matt Gibson (SCO)	3–0	
Winner	2.	1974	British Under-19 Championship (2)	Paul Smith (ENG)	4–1	

== Bibliography ==
- Everton, Clive (1985). Snooker: The Records. Enfield: Guinness Superlatives Ltd. ISBN 0851124488.
- Everton, Clive (2012). Black farce and cue ball wizards. Edinburgh: Mainstream. ISBN 9781780575681.
- Hayton, Eric; Dee, John (2004). The CueSport Book of Professional Snooker: The Complete Record & History. Lowestoft: Rose Villa Publications. ISBN 9780954854904.
- Morrison, Ian (1987). The Hamlyn Encyclopedia of Snooker - revised edition. Twickenham: Hamlyn Publishing Group. ISBN 0600556042.
- Morrison, Ian (1988). Hamlyn Who's Who in Snooker. London: Hamlyn. ISBN 0600557138.
