= British Junior Snooker Championship =

Snooker tournament

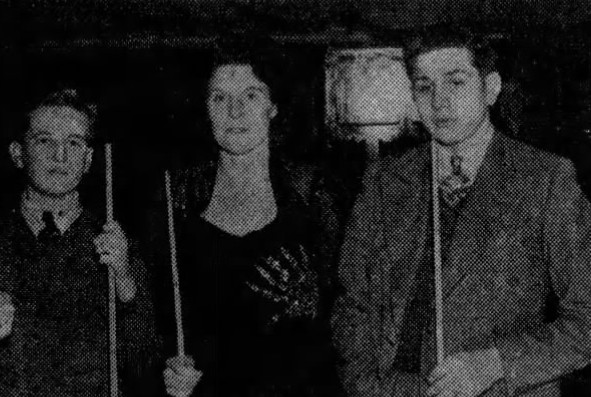
Terence Shairp, Joyce Gardner (centre) and Rex Williams (right) at the 1949 Boys Snooker Championship in Scunthorpe

The British Junior Snooker Championship was a snooker tournament organised, usually as two age-restricted competitions, by the Billiards and Snooker Control Council (B&SCC), which was known as the Billiards Association and Control Council (BA&CC) until 1971. The under-19 competition was sometimes called the Junior Championship, and the under-16 tournament was occasionally called the Boys' Championship.

The BA&CC had established the British Junior English Billiards Championship in 1922. In 1943 the Boys' Snooker Championship Association was formed, and invited boys under the age of 16 who were amateurs to enter its "All-England Snooker Championship". An article in The Billiard Player, the official magazine of the BA&CC, stated that "Although the BA&CC takes no cognizance of players under the age of 16, it looks forward with interest to the progress of this Championship." The final of the first edition was held on 7 March 1944 at Baths Hall, Scunthorpe, and was attended by over 1,000 spectators. Gary Owen defeated Percy Hinton by 4 frames to 3 to take the inaugural title. In 1945, the Boys' Snooker Championship Association formally affiliated itself to the BA&CC. World snooker champion Joe Davis refereed the final that year, and Raymond Glendenning recorded commentary for BBC Radio. This under-16 snooker championship ran annually until 1949, when the venue moved to Burroughes and Watts, London, under the auspices of the BA&CC.

In 1948, the BA&CC held a championship for boys aged 16 to 18, which was organised by W. J. Rainbow of Burroughes and Watts at Burroughes Hall, and became an annual event. Burroughes and Watts ceased trading in 1966, and there were no junior championships in 1967. Journalist Clive Everton was responsible for the revival of the championship in 1968. He arranged sponsorship from manufacturers Accles & Pollock, who were promoting a tubular steel cue, and the venue became their sports club in Oldbury. From 1974, the renamed B&SCC reassumed responsibility for the event.

For 1992, the B&SCC decided to replace the under-16 and under-19 tournaments with a single under-18 event. However, the B&SCC went into voluntary liquidation during the 1991–92 snooker season and that year's tournament was staged with the support of the World Professional Billiards and Snooker Association (WPBSA). Stephen Lee won the championship by defeating Paul Hunter 4–2, and went on to win the English Amateur Championship a week later. In 1993 the WPBSA established the English Association of Snooker and Billiards (EASB) with the aim of the EASB becoming the governing body for amateur snooker and English billiards in England. The EASB established its own under-17 championship for 1994.

== Under-16 ==
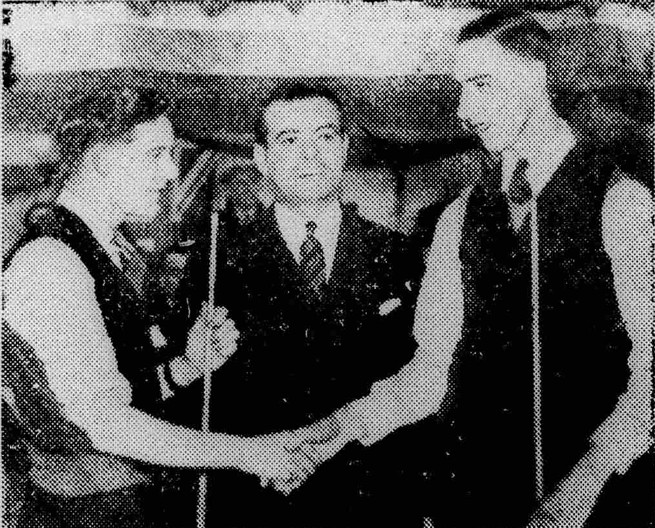
Ronald Baker (left), Joe Davis (centre) and Christopher Gannon at the final of the 1945 Boys Snooker Championship

Under-16 Champions
Year	Winner	Score	Runner-up	Venue	Ref.
1944	Gary Owen (WAL)	4–3	Percy Hinton (ENG)	Baths Hall, Scunthorpe	
1945	Ronald Baker (WAL)	4–1	Christopher Gannon (ENG)	Baths Hall, Scunthorpe	
1946	David Thomas (WAL)	4–3	Dennis Smith (ENG)	Baths Hall, Scunthorpe	
1947	Maurice Knapp (ENG)	4–1	Ralph Whitehead (ENG)	Baths Hall, Scunthorpe	
1948	Rex Williams (ENG)	4–1	Gordon Hobbs (ENG)	Baths Hall, Scunthorpe	
1949	Rex Williams (ENG)	3–1	Terence Shairp (ENG)	Baths Hall, Scunthorpe	
1949	Derek Lewis (WAL)	3–0	Ivor Cheetham (ENG)	Burroughes Hall, London	
1950	Marcus Owen (WAL)	3–0	Derek Williams (WAL)	Burroughes Hall, London	
1951	Marcus Owen (WAL)	3–0	Emlyn Parry (WAL)	Burroughes Hall, London	
1952	Mark Wildman (ENG)	3–0	Dennis Breeze (ENG)	Burroughes Hall, London	
1953	John Board (ENG)	3–1	Keith Preston (ENG)	Burroughes Hall, London	
1954	David Bond (ENG)	3–2	Brian Allen (ENG)	Burroughes Hall, London	
1955	Peter Shelley (ENG)	3–1	Peter Ferrari (ENG)	Burroughes Hall, London	
1956	Anthony Hart (ENG)	3–1	David Bond (ENG)	Burroughes Hall, London	
1957	Peter Shelley (ENG)	3–1	Anthony Orchard (WAL)	Burroughes Hall, London	
1958	David Bend (ENG)	3–0	David Trevelyan (ENG)	Burroughes Hall, London	
1959	Jim Doyle (IRE)	3–1	Peter Cox (ENG)	Burroughes Hall, London	
1960	Norwood Cripps (ENG)	3–1	Anthony Matthews (ENG)	Burroughes Hall, London	
1961	John Pritty (ENG)	3–1	Victor Atkinson (ENG)	Burroughes Hall, London	
1962	John Virgo (ENG)	3–1	Anthony Grant (ENG)	Burroughes Hall, London	
1963	John Hollis (ENG)	3–0	Terence McCarver (ENG)	Burroughes Hall, London	
1964	David Clinton (ENG)	3–0	John Hollis (ENG)	Burroughes Hall, London	
1965	J. Maugham (ENG)	3–0	P. Demaine (ENG)	Burroughes Hall, London	
1966	John Terry (WAL)	3–1	Ron Reardon (WAL)	Burroughes Hall, London	
1967	Not held				
1968	Edward Stone (ENG)	3–2	Alan Vincent (ENG)	Accles & Pollock, Oldbury	
1969	Philip Hughes (WAL)	3–2	Willie Thorne (ENG)	Accles & Pollock, Oldbury	
1970	Willie Thorne (ENG)	3–2	Roger Mays (ENG)	Accles & Pollock, Oldbury	
1971	John Mills (WAL)	3–1	Robert Dean (ENG)	Accles & Pollock, Oldbury	
1972	John Mills (WAL)	3–1	Trevor Wells (ENG)	Accles & Pollock, Oldbury	
1973	Peter Bardsley (ENG)	3–2	Kerry Jones (WAL)	Accles & Pollock, Oldbury	
1974	Stephen Holroyd (ENG)	3–0	David Batty (ENG)	Northern Snooker Centre, Leeds	
1975	Mike Hallett (ENG)	3–1	Paul Hargreaves (ENG)	Northern Snooker Centre, Leeds	
1976	Wayne Jones (WAL)	3–0	David Bonney (ENG)	Northern Snooker Centre, Leeds	
1977	Jimmy White (ENG)	3–2	David Bonney (ENG)	Northern Snooker Centre, Leeds	
1978	Danny Adds (ENG)	3–1	Mike Jackson (ENG)	Northern Snooker Centre, Leeds	
1979	Tony Pyle (ENG)	3–2	John Parrott (ENG)	Commonwealth Sporting Club, Blackpool	
1980	Terry Whitthread (ENG)	3–1	John Parrott (ENG)	Bulwell Church Institute, Nottingham	
1981	Chris Hamson (ENG)	3–1	Steve Ventham (ENG)	Sheffield Snooker Centre	
1982	Steve Ventham (ENG)	3–1	Colin Thomas (ENG)	North Midland Snooker Centre, Worksop	
1983	Stephen Hendry (SCO)	3–0	Nick Pearce (ENG)	Thornaby Snooker Centre, Teesside	
1984	Brian Morgan (ENG)	3–2	Anthony Harris (ENG)	Charnwood Snooker Centre, Loughborough	
1985	Barrie Bunn (ENG)	3–1	Mike Russell (ENG)	Charnwood Snooker Centre, Loughborough	
1986	David Grimwood (ENG)	3–0	Darren Clarke (ENG)	Willie Thorne Snooker Centre, Leicester	
1987	Jamie Woodman (ENG)	3–0	Mark Peevers (ENG)	Charnwood Snooker Centre, Loughborough	
1988	David Grimwood (ENG)	3–1	John Lardner (SCO)	Dudley Snooker Centre	
1989	Ronnie O'Sullivan (ENG)	3–1	Andy Hicks (ENG)	Dudley Snooker Centre	
1990	Stephen Lee (ENG)	3–0	Matthew Paffett (ENG)	Dudley Snooker Centre	
1991	Mark Williams (WAL)	4–0	John Higgins (SCO)	Dudley Snooker Centre	

== Under-19 ==
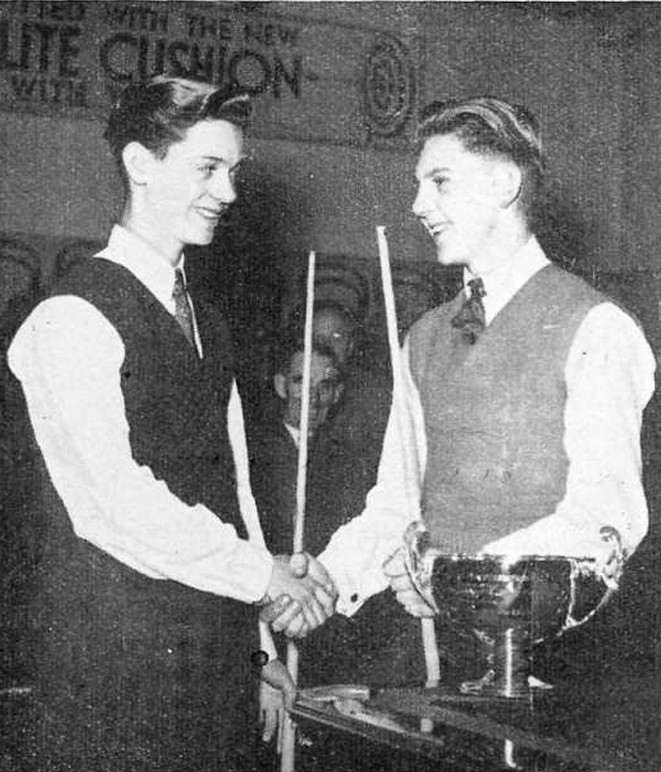
Allen Kemp (right) and Leighton Watts after the inaugural under-19 final

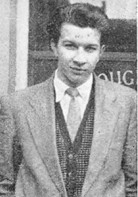
Cliff Wilson (pictured in 1955) won the under-19 championship in 1952 and 1953.

Under-19 Champions
Year	Winner	Score	Runner-up	Venue	Ref.
1949	Allen Kemp (WAL)	3–1	Leighton Watts (WAL)	Burroughes Hall, London	
1950	Jack Carney (WAL)	3–2	Ray Reardon (WAL)	Burroughes Hall, London	
1951	Rex Williams (ENG)	3–2	Cliff Wilson (WAL)	Burroughes Hall, London	
1952	Cliff Wilson (WAL)	3–2	Marcus Owen (WAL)	Burroughes Hall, London	
1953	Cliff Wilson (WAL)	4–2	Marcus Owen (WAL)	Burroughes Hall, London	
1954	Mark Wildman (ENG)	4–2	Emlyn Parry (WAL)	Burroughes Hall, London	
1955	William McGivern (SCO)	5–0	Mark Wildman (ENG)	Burroughes Hall, London	
1956	Eddie Sinclair (SCO)	5–0	Alex Hope (SCO)	Burroughes Hall, London	
1957	Henry Burns (ENG)	4–0	George Wright (ENG)	Burroughes Hall, London	
1958	Wally West (ENG)	4–2	David Bond (ENG)	Burroughes Hall, London	
1959	David Roots (ENG)	4–3	David Bend (ENG)	Burroughes Hall, London	
1960	David Bend (ENG)	4–3	Ian Rees (WAL)	Burroughes Hall, London	
1961	Ian Rees (WAL)	4–0	Terence Clarke (ENG)	Burroughes Hall, London	
1962	Anthony Matthews (ENG)	4–1	Terry Collinson (ENG)	Burroughes Hall, London	
1963	Anthony Matthews (ENG)	4–3	Alan Stringer (ENG)	Burroughes Hall, London	
1964	Joseph Fisher (ENG)	4–0	Robert Dolbear (ENG)	Burroughes Hall, London	
1965	John Virgo (ENG)	4–3	John Hollis (ENG)	Burroughes Hall, London	
1966	John Hollis (ENG)	4–0	Michael Colleran (ENG)	Burroughes Hall, London	
1967	Not held				
1968	John Maughan (ENG)	4–0	David Clinton (ENG)	Accles & Pollock, Oldbury	
1969	John Terry (WAL)	4–2	Jeffrey Peacock (ENG)	Accles & Pollock, Oldbury	
1970	John Terry (WAL)	4–2	William Blake (ENG)	Accles & Pollock, Oldbury	
1971	Joe Johnson (ENG)	3–0	George Crimes (ENG)	Accles & Pollock, Oldbury	
1972	Tony Knowles (ENG)	3–0	Matt Gibson (SCO)	Accles & Pollock, Oldbury	
1973	Willie Thorne (ENG)	3–0	Peter Edworthy (ENG)	Accles & Pollock, Oldbury	
1974	Tony Knowles (ENG)	4–1	Paul Smith (ENG)	Northern Snooker Centre, Leeds	
1975	Eugene Hughes (IRE)	4–1	Peter Bain (ENG)	Owley Wood Recreation Centre, Weaverham	
1976	Ian Williamson (ENG)	3–0	Phillip Death (WAL)	Northern Snooker Centre, Leeds	
1977	Ian Williamson (ENG)	3–0	Wayne Jones (WAL)	Northern Snooker Centre, Leeds	
1978	Tony Meo (ENG)	3–1	Ian Williamson (ENG)	Northern Snooker Centre, Leeds	
1979	Joe O'Boye (IRL)	3–0	Dave Gilbert (ENG)	Commonwealth Sporting Club, Blackpool	
1980	Tommy Murphy (NIR)	3–1	Keith Hayward (ENG)	Bulwell Church Institute, Nottingham	
1981	Dean Reynolds (ENG)	3–1	Tommy Murphy (NIR)	Sheffield Snooker Centre	
1982	Neal Foulds (ENG)	3–2	John Parrott (ENG)	North Midland Snooker Centre, Worksop	
1983	Mark Thompson (ENG)	3–1	Brian Rowsell (ENG)	Thornaby Snooker Centre, Teesside	
1984	Martin Clark (ENG)	3–1	Brian Rowsell (ENG)	Charnwood Snooker Centre, Loughborough	
1985	Wayne Rendle (ENG)	3–2	Mark Cadenhead (SCO)	Charnwood Snooker Centre, Loughborough	
1986	Barry Pinches (ENG)	3–0	James Wattana (THA)	Willie Thorne Snooker Centre, Leicester	
1987	Mark Johnston-Allen (ENG)	3–2	Andrew Henry (SCO)	Charnwood Snooker Centre, Loughborough	
1988	Joe Swail (NIR)	3–0	Anton Bishop (ENG)	Dudley Snooker Centre	
1989	Paul McPhillips (SCO)	3–0	Kevin Young (ENG)	Dudley Snooker Centre	
1990	Rod Lawler (ENG)	3–0	Lee Richardson (ENG)	Dudley Snooker Centre	
1991	Andy Hicks (ENG)	4–3	Bradley Jones (ENG)	Dudley Snooker Centre	

== Under-18 ==
Under-18 Champion
Year	Winner	score	Runner-up	Venue or location	Ref.
1992	Stephen Lee (ENG)	4–2	Paul Hunter (ENG)	Spalding Snooker Centre	
