= 2015 World Seniors Championship =

Tournament information
- Dates: 2–3 March 2015
- Venue: Circus Arena
- City: Blackpool
- Country: England
- Organisation: WPBSA
- Format: Seniors event
- Total prize fund: £50,000
- Winner's share: £18,000
- Highest break: (Wales) Mark Williams (140)

Final
- Champion: (Wales) Mark Williams
- Runner-up: (Republic of Ireland) Fergal O'Brien
- Score: 2–1

The 2015 World Seniors Championship (Known for sponsorship reasons as the Betway World Seniors Championship) was a snooker tournament that took place between 2–3 March 2015 at the Circus Arena in Blackpool, England.

The Circus Arena played host to the tournament for the first time, having previously being held at the Mountbatten Centre in Portsmouth.

The age limit of the event was reduced from 45 to 40 years, allowing players such as Mark Williams, Peter Ebdon, Dominic Dale and Fergal O'Brien to enter. Players had to be aged 40 or above at the end of the 2015 World Championship (4 May 2015).

Steve Davis was the defending champion, but he lost 0–2 against Fergal O'Brien in the quarter-finals. Mark Williams won his 26th professional title by defeating Fergal O'Brien 2–1 in the final.

== Prize fund ==
The breakdown of prize money for this year is shown below:

- Winner: £18,000
- Runner-up: £8,000
- Semi-finalist: £4,000
- Quarter-finalist: £2,000
- Last 16: £1,000
- Total: £50,000

== Main draw ==
The draw for the last 16 was made on 3 December 2014 at the Barbican Centre in York during the UK Championship. All former World Seniors Champions and World Snooker Champions, who registered for the event, were seeded through to the final stages in Blackpool. There were three century breaks during the tournament. Mark Williams made a 140 break against Darryn Walker and Fergal O'Brien made a 110 and 105 break against Peter Ebdon.

Last 16; Best of 3 frames
(Republic of Ireland) Fergal O'Brien	2
(England) Peter Ebdon	0
(England) Steve Davis	2
(England) Rory McLeod	1
(Republic of Ireland) Ken Doherty	2
(England) Jimmy White	0
(Wales) Darren Morgan	2
(Northern Ireland) Dennis Taylor	0
(England) John Parrott	2
(Canada) Cliff Thorburn	0
(Scotland) Paul McPhillips	2
(England) Joe Johnson	1
(Wales) Dominic Dale	2
(England) Nigel Bond	0
(Wales) Mark Williams	2
(England) Darryn Walker	0

Quarter-finals; Best of 3 frames
(Republic of Ireland) Fergal O'Brien	2
(England) Steve Davis	0
(Republic of Ireland) Ken Doherty	2
(Wales) Darren Morgan	0
(England) John Parrott	2
(Scotland) Paul McPhillips	0
(Wales) Dominic Dale	0
(Wales) Mark Williams	2

Semi-finals; Best of 3 frames
(Republic of Ireland) Fergal O'Brien	2
(Republic of Ireland) Ken Doherty	0
(England) John Parrott	0
(Wales) Mark Williams	2

Final; Best of 3 frames
(Republic of Ireland) Fergal O'Brien	1
(Wales) Mark Williams	2

== Final ==
Final: Best of 3 frames. Referee: Greg Coniglio. Tower Circus, Blackpool, England, 3 March 2015.
Mark Williams; Wales	2–1	Fergal O'Brien; Ireland
30–41, 87–4 (73), 94–0
73	Highest break	39
0	Century breaks	0
1	50+ breaks	0

== Qualifying ==
These matches were played on 20 and 21 December 2014 at the Robin Park Arena, Sports and Tennis Centre in Wigan, England. There were two century breaks during the qualifying. Dominic Dale made a 129 break against Peter Delaney and Rory McLeod made a 104 break against Andrew Milliard.

Round 1 Best of 3 frames
(Malta) Tony Drago	1
(England) Rory McLeod	2
(England) Andrew Milliard	2
(England) Tony Taylor	1
(India) David Singh	w/d
(England) Jamie Bodle	w/o
(England) Ian Brumby	2
(England) Ashley Beal	0
(Republic of Ireland) Dessie Sheehan	1
(Republic of Ireland) John Leahy	2
(Northern Ireland) Gerard Greene	2
(England) Balvinder Sembi	0
(Scotland) Alan McManus	2
(England) Steve Meakin	1

Round 2 Best of 3 frames
(England) Rory McLeod	2
(England) Andrew Milliard	0
(England) Alan Edmonds	w/d
(England) Jamie Bodle	w/o
(England) Ian Brumby	2
(Republic of Ireland) John Leahy	1
(Northern Ireland) Gerard Greene	0
(Scotland) Alan McManus	2

Round 3 Best of 3 frames
(England) Rory McLeod	2
(England) Jamie Bodle	1
(England) Ian Brumby	2
(Scotland) Alan McManus	0

Round 4 Best of 3 frames
(England) Rory McLeod	2
(England) Ian Brumby	0

Round 1 Best of 3 frames
(Wales) Dominic Dale	2
(England) Peter Delaney	0
(England) Geoff Williams	2
(England) Stuart Parnell	1
(England) Mike Dunn	w/d
(England) Peter Bardsley	w/o
(England) Joe Perry	w/d
(England) Andrew Alexandrou	w/o
(Mauritius) Richard Somauroo	0
(Wales) Tony Chappel	2
(Scotland) Scott MacFarlane	2
(England) Paul Davison	1
(England) Dave Harold	2
(Netherlands) Raymon Fabrie	0

Round 2 Best of 3 frames
(Wales) Dominic Dale	2
(England) Geoff Williams	1
(England) Peter Bardsley	1
(England) Andrew Alexandrou	2
(Wales) Anthony Davies	1
(Wales) Tony Chappel	2
(Scotland) Scott MacFarlane	0
(England) Dave Harold	2

Round 3 Best of 3 frames
(Wales) Dominic Dale	2
(England) Andrew Alexandrou	0
(Wales) Tony Chappel	2
(England) Dave Harold	0

Round 4 Best of 3 frames
(Wales) Dominic Dale	2
(Wales) Tony Chappel	0

Round 1 Best of 3 frames
(England) Anthony Harris	2
(England) Shane Haines	0
(England) Darryn Walker	2
(England) Jamie Home	0
(Wales) Darren Thompson	w/o
(England) Anthony Hamilton	w/d
(England) Andy Hicks	0
(England) Peter Lines	2
(England) Johnathan Bagley	w/o
(Malta) Alex Borg	w/d
(England) Jamie Rous	2
(England) Tony Knowles	1
(Scotland) David McLellan	1
(Finland) Robin Hull	2

Round 2 Best of 3 frames
(England) Anthony Harris	0
(England) Darryn Walker	2
(England) Paul Stockwell	0
(Wales) Darren Thompson	2
(England) Peter Lines	0
(England) Johnathan Bagley	2
(England) Jamie Rous	0
(Finland) Robin Hull	2

Round 3 Best of 3 frames
(England) Darryn Walker	2
(Wales) Darren Thompson	1
(England) Johnathan Bagley	2
(Finland) Robin Hull	1

Round 4 Best of 3 frames
(England) Darryn Walker	2
(England) Johnathan Bagley	0

Round 1 Best of 3 frames
(Scotland) Marcus Campbell	w/o
(England) Nigel Gilbert	n/s
(England) Mike Hallett	0
(England) Gary Filtness	2
(England) Karl Townsend	2
(England) Craig Barber	1
(England) Ian Barry Stark	2
(England) Rod Lawler	0
(Scotland) Craig MacGillivray	2
(England) Hassan Vaizie	0
(Republic of Ireland) Patsy Fagan	2
(Jamaica) Paul Moss	0

Round 2 Best of 3 frames
(England) Dean Reynolds	0
(Scotland) Marcus Campbell	2
(Scotland) Paul McPhillips	2
(England) Gary Filtness	0
(England) Karl Townsend	2
(England) Ian Barry Stark	1
(Scotland) Craig MacGillivray	2
(Republic of Ireland) Patsy Fagan	0

Round 3 Best of 3 frames
(Scotland) Marcus Campbell	1
(Scotland) Paul McPhillips	2
(England) Karl Townsend	0
(Scotland) Craig MacGillivray	2

Round 4 Best of 3 frames
(Scotland) Paul McPhillips	2
(Scotland) Craig MacGillivray	1

Round 1 Best of 3 frames
(England) David Roe	0
(Northern Ireland) Joe Swail	2
(England) Jimmy O'Shea	0
(Republic of Ireland) Fergal O'Brien	2
(England) Mark King	2
(England) Barry Pinches	0
(England) Les Dodd	0
(England) John Welsh	2
(England) Alex Peart	0
(England) Adrian Rosa	2

Round 2 Best of 3 frames
(England) Gary Miller	0
(Northern Ireland) Joe Swail	2
(England) Mark Davis	0
(Republic of Ireland) Fergal O'Brien	2
(England) Gary Wilkinson	2
(England) Mark King	0
(England) John Welsh	2
(England) Adrian Rosa	0

Round 3 Best of 3 frames
(Northern Ireland) Joe Swail	0
(Republic of Ireland) Fergal O'Brien	2
(England) Gary Wilkinson	2
(England) John Welsh	1

Round 4 Best of 3 frames
(Republic of Ireland) Fergal O'Brien	2
(England) Gary Wilkinson	1

== Centuries ==
=== Main stage centuries ===
- 140 – Mark Williams
- 110, 105 – Fergal O'Brien

=== Qualifying stage centuries ===
- 129 – Dominic Dale
