= 2016 World Seniors Championship =

Tournament information
- Dates: 30–31 January 2016
- Venue: Guild Hall
- City: Preston
- Country: England
- Organisation: WPBSA
- Format: Seniors event
- Total prize fund: £50,000
- Winner's share: £18,000
- Highest break: (Wales) Dominic Dale (104)

Final
- Champion: (England) Mark Davis
- Runner-up: (Wales) Darren Morgan
- Score: 2–1

The 2016 World Seniors Championship (Known for sponsorship reasons as the 888sport World Seniors Championship) was a snooker tournament that took place on 30–31 January 2016 at the Guild Hall in Preston, England. Players had to be at least 40 years old at the end of the 2015/16 season.

The championship was won by Mark Davis, who beat Darren Morgan 2–1 in the final. Defending champion Mark Williams lost to Anthony Hamilton in the last-16 round.

== Prize fund ==
The breakdown of prize money for this year is shown below:

- Winner: £18,000
- Runner-up: £8,000
- Semi-finalist: £4,000
- Quarter-finalist: £2,000
- Last 16: £1,000
- Total: £50,000

== Field ==
Previous winners of the World Seniors Championship and the World Snooker Championship were exempted from qualifying and went directly into the last 16.

- Nigel Bond - 2012 World Seniors Champion
- Ken Doherty - 1997 World Champion
- Peter Ebdon - 2002 World Champion
- Joe Johnson - 1986 World Champion
- Darren Morgan - 2011 World Seniors Champion
- John Parrott - 1991 World Champion
- Jimmy White - 2010 World Seniors Champion
- Mark Williams - 2000, 2003 World Champion, 2015 World Seniors Champion

== Main draw ==
The draw for the last 16 was made on 23 December 2015. The draw for the quarter-finals and semi-finals were made on a random basis after the previous round had finished. The last-16 round was played on 30 January with the quarter-finals on the afternoon of 31 January and the semi-finals and final on the same evening.

Last 16; Best of 3 frames
(England) Mark Davis	2
(Republic of Ireland) Ken Doherty	1
(England) Robert Milkins	2
(Malta) Tony Drago	0
(England) Rory McLeod	2
(Republic of Ireland) Fergal O'Brien	1
(England) Nigel Bond	2
(England) Peter Ebdon	0
(England) Jimmy White	2
(England) Gary Lees	0
(Wales) Dominic Dale	2
(England) John Parrott	0
(England) Anthony Hamilton	2
(Wales) Mark Williams	1
(Wales) Darren Morgan	2
(England) Joe Johnson	0

Quarter-finals; Best of 3 frames
(England) Mark Davis	2
(England) Robert Milkins	0
(England) Rory McLeod	2
(England) Nigel Bond	1
(England) Jimmy White	2
(Wales) Dominic Dale	0
(England) Anthony Hamilton	1
(Wales) Darren Morgan	2

Semi-finals; Best of 3 frames
(England) Mark Davis	2
(England) Rory McLeod	0
(England) Jimmy White	0
(Wales) Darren Morgan	2

Final; Best of 3 frames
(England) Mark Davis	2
(Wales) Darren Morgan	1

== Final ==
Final: Best of 3 frames. Referee: . Guild Hall, Preston, England, 31 January 2016.
Darren Morgan; Wales	1–2	Mark Davis; England
15–62, 70–30 (55), 0–81 (76)
55	Highest break	76
0	Century breaks	0
1	50+ breaks	1

== Qualifying ==
These matches were played on 21 and 22 December 2015 at the Robin Park Arena, Sports and Tennis Centre in Wigan, England.

Round 1 Best of 3 frames

Round 2 Best of 3 frames
(England) Barry Pinches	1
(England) Jamie Bodle	2
(England) Clive A Bernstone	1
(England) Peter Donegan	2
(Wales) Dominic Dale	w/o
(England) Nicky Lazarus	w/d
(England) Shane Haines	0
(Scotland) Paul McPhillips	2

Round 3 Best of 3 frames
(England) Jamie Bodle	2
(England) Peter Donegan	0
(Wales) Dominic Dale	2
(Scotland) Paul McPhillips	0

Round 4 Best of 3 frames
(England) Jamie Bodle	0
(Wales) Dominic Dale	2

Round 1 Best of 3 frames
(England) Jason Weston	0
(England) Mark Davis	2

Round 2 Best of 3 frames
(England) Tony Knowles	0
(England) Mark Davis	2
(Scotland) John Rea	w/o
(England) Stuart Parnell	w/d
(England) John Welsh	2
(England) Stephen Rowlings	1
(South Africa) Paul Burrell	1
(England) Gary Wilkinson	2

Round 3 Best of 3 frames
(England) Mark Davis	2
(Scotland) John Rea	0
(England) John Welsh	0
(England) Gary Wilkinson	2

Round 4 Best of 3 frames
(England) Mark Davis	2
(England) Gary Wilkinson	0

Round 1 Best of 3 frames
(England) Gary Miller	2
(Republic of Ireland) Dessie Sheehan	0

Round 2 Best of 3 frames
(Scotland) Craig MacGillivray	2
(England) Barry Stark	0
(England) Robert Milkins	2
(Jamaica) Paul Moss	0
(England) Les Dodd	2
(England) Peter Delaney	0
(Scotland) David McLellan	2
(England) Gary Miller	0

Round 3 Best of 3 frames
(Scotland) Craig MacGillivray	0
(England) Robert Milkins	2
(England) Les Dodd	2
(Scotland) David McLellan	0

Round 4 Best of 3 frames
(England) Robert Milkins	2
(England) Les Dodd	0

Round 1 Best of 3 frames

Round 2 Best of 3 frames
(England) Shaun Wilkes	0
(England) Julian Mills	2
(England) Mark King	2
(England) Leigh Robinson	1
(England) Adrian Rosa	0
(England) Gary Lees	2
(Wales) Darren Thompson	2
(England) Anthony Harris	0

Round 3 Best of 3 frames
(England) Julian Mills	0
(England) Mark King	2
(England) Gary Lees	2
(Wales) Darren Thompson	0

Round 4 Best of 3 frames
(England) Mark King	1
(England) Gary Lees	2

Round 1 Best of 3 frames
(England) Dean Reynolds	0
(Scotland) Jamie Burnett	2

Round 2 Best of 3 frames
(England) Peter J Bardsley	2
(England) John Fox	1
(England) Andrew Milliard	0
(England) Anthony Hamilton	2
(Wales) Tony Chappel	2
(England) Imran Puri	0
(Republic of Ireland) Patsy Fagan	w/d
(Scotland) Jamie Burnett	w/o

Round 3 Best of 3 frames
(England) Peter J Bardsley	0
(England) Anthony Hamilton	2
(Wales) Tony Chappel	2
(Scotland) Jamie Burnett	1

Round 4 Best of 3 frames
(England) Anthony Hamilton	2
(Wales) Tony Chappel	0

Round 1 Best of 3 frames
(Northern Ireland) Gerard Greene	0
(England) Peter Lines	2

Round 2 Best of 3 frames
(England) Robert Marshall	1
(England) Peter Lines	2
(England) Mike Dunn	0
(Northern Ireland) Joe Swail	2
(Scotland) Guilio Rea	0
(Scotland) Scott MacFarlane	2
(England) David Craggs	1
(Malta) Tony Drago	2

Round 3 Best of 3 frames
(England) Peter Lines	2
(Northern Ireland) Joe Swail	1
(Scotland) Scott MacFarlane	1
(Malta) Tony Drago	2

Round 4 Best of 3 frames
(England) Peter Lines	0
(Malta) Tony Drago	2

Round 1 Best of 3 frames
(England) Ian Brumby	2
(England) Jamie Rous	1

Round 2 Best of 3 frames
(England) Wayne Brown	2
(Mauritius) Richard Somauroo	0
(England) Steven Gough	2
(England) Ian Brumby	0
(Republic of Ireland) Fergal O'Brien	2
(England) Johnathan Bagley	1
(England) Sean Lanigan	2
(England) Steve Meakin	0

Round 3 Best of 3 frames
(England) Wayne Brown	2
(England) Steven Gough	0
(Republic of Ireland) Fergal O'Brien	2
(England) Sean Lanigan	0

Round 4 Best of 3 frames
(England) Wayne Brown	0
(Republic of Ireland) Fergal O'Brien	2

Round 1 Best of 3 frames

Round 2 Best of 3 frames
(England) Karl Townsend	1
(England) Geoff Williams	2
(England) Rod Lawler	2
(Wales) Lee Walker	1
(England) Gary Filtness	w/d
(England) Rory McLeod	w/o
(England) Ashley Beal	0
(England) Darryn Walker	2

Round 3 Best of 3 frames
(England) Geoff Williams	0
(England) Rod Lawler	2
(England) Rory McLeod	2
(England) Darryn Walker	1

Round 4 Best of 3 frames
(England) Rod Lawler	1
(England) Rory McLeod	2

== Centuries ==
=== Main event centuries ===
- 104 – Dominic Dale

=== Qualifying stage centuries ===
- 116 – Lee Walker
