= 1992 Classic (snooker) =

Mercantile Credit Classic
Tournament information
- Dates: 1–11 January 1992
- Venue: Bournemouth International Centre
- City: Bournemouth
- Country: England
- Organisation: WPBSA
- Format: Ranking event
- Total prize fund: £326,000
- Winner's share: £60,000
- Highest break: Stephen Hendry (SCO) (140)

Final
- Champion: Steve Davis (ENG)
- Runner-up: Stephen Hendry (SCO)
- Score: 9–8

The 1992 Mercantile Credit Classic was the thirteenth and final edition of the professional snooker tournament which took place from 1–11 January 1992 with ITV coverage beginning on the 4th. It was played again at the Bournemouth International Centre in Dorset.

Steve Davis won his sixth Classic title beating Stephen Hendry who was in the final for the second year running in a final frame decider and his first ranking title since the 1989 Grand Prix.

== Main draw ==
First Round; Best of 9 frames
(England) Jimmy White	5
(England) Mark Rowing	3
(South Africa) Peter Francisco	3
(Republic of Ireland) Stephen Murphy	5
(England) Nigel Bond	5
(England) Anthony Hamilton	4
(England) Tony Jones	3
(Northern Ireland) Jack McLaughlin	5
(England) Mike Hallett	5
(Australia) Warren King	2
(Canada) Bob Chaperon	5
(Canada) Kirk Stevens	0
(Wales) Terry Griffiths	5
(England) Roger Bales	0
(Wales) Mark Bennett	3
(England) Jason Ferguson	5
(England) Steve Davis	5
(England) Nick Dyson	0
(Australia) Eddie Charlton	3
(England) Rod Lawler	5
(England) Willie Thorne	5
(England) Robert Marshall	2
(Wales) Darren Morgan	5
(England) Dean Reynolds	2
(England) Neal Foulds	5
(England) Nigel Gilbert	1
(England) John Virgo	5
(England) Bill Oliver	4
(Scotland) Alan McManus	5
(Wales) Doug Mountjoy	0
(Wales) Cliff Wilson	5
(Republic of Ireland) Joe O'Boye	2
(Scotland) Stephen Hendry	5
(England) Bob Harris	2
(England) Joe Johnson	2
(Scotland) Paul McPhillips	5
(Northern Ireland) Dennis Taylor	5
(Australia) Robby Foldvari
(England) Danny Fowler	5
(England) Jon Wright	0
(England) Martin Clark	5
(England) Mark Davis	2
(England) Steve Duggan	5
(Wales) Steve Newbury	3
(England) Steve James	5
(England) Mark Johnston-Allen	3
(Malta) Tony Drago	0
(Republic of Ireland) Ken Doherty	5
(England) Gary Wilkinson	5
(England) Mick Price	2
(Canada) Cliff Thorburn	5
(New Zealand) Dene O'Kane	3
(England) Tony Knowles	1
(England) Les Dodd	5
(Thailand) James Wattana	5
(Canada) Jim Wych	2
(Canada) Alain Robidoux	5
(England) Ray Edmonds	2
(South Africa) Silvino Francisco	5
(Wales) Colin Roscoe	3
(England) John Parrott	5
(England) Steve Campbell	2
(Wales) Wayne Jones	5
(England) Paul Gibson	1

Second Round; Best of 9 frames
(England) Jimmy White	5
(Republic of Ireland) Stephen Murphy	3
(England) Nigel Bond	5
(Northern Ireland) Jack McLaughlin	3
(England) Mike Hallett	5
(Canada) Bob Chaperon	4
(Wales) Terry Griffiths	5
(England) Jason Ferguson	2
(England) Steve Davis	5
(England) Rod Lawler	3
(England) Willie Thorne	3
(Wales) Darren Morgan	5
(England) Neal Foulds	3
(England) John Virgo	5
(Scotland) Alan McManus	5
(Wales) Cliff Wilson	2
(Scotland) Stephen Hendry	5
(Scotland) Paul McPhillips	1
(Northern Ireland) Dennis Taylor	4
(England) Danny Fowler	5
(England) Martin Clark	5
(England) Steve Duggan	4
(England) Steve James	1
(Republic of Ireland) Ken Doherty	5
(England) Gary Wilkinson	5
(Canada) Cliff Thorburn	4
(England) Les Dodd	1
(Thailand) James Wattana	5
(Canada) Alain Robidoux	5
(South Africa) Silvino Francisco	2
(England) John Parrott	5
(Wales) Wayne Jones	1

Third Round; Best of 9 frames
(England) Jimmy White	4
(England) Nigel Bond	5
(England) Mike Hallett	5
(Wales) Terry Griffiths	2
(England) Steve Davis	5
(Wales) Darren Morgan	1
(England) John Virgo	0
(Scotland) Alan McManus	5
(Scotland) Stephen Hendry	5
(England) Danny Fowler	3
(England) Martin Clark	5
(Republic of Ireland) Ken Doherty	4
(England) Gary Wilkinson	3
(Thailand) James Wattana	5
(Canada) Alain Robidoux	3
(England) John Parrott	5

Quarter-finals; Best of 9 frames
(England) Mike Hallett	4
(England) Nigel Bond	5
(England) Steve Davis	5
(Scotland) Alan McManus	3
(Scotland) Stephen Hendry	5
(England) Martin Clark	0
(Thailand) James Wattana	5
(England) John Parrott	0

Semi-finals; Best of 11 frames
(England) Nigel Bond	2
(England) Steve Davis	6
(Scotland) Stephen Hendry	6
(Thailand) James Wattana	1

Final; Best of 17 frames
(England) Steve Davis	9
(Scotland) Stephen Hendry	8

== Final ==
Final: Best of 17 frames. Referee: Len Ganley; Bournemouth International Centre, Bournemouth, England, 11 January 1992.
Steve Davis; England	9–8	Stephen Hendry; Scotland
First session: 73–44 (73), 39–67, 47–66, 6–72 (54), 71–32, 84–0, 81–9; Second session: 110–22 (67), 24–83 (56), 58–26, 15–108 (108), 15–95, 68–20 (67), 99–1 (99), 5–90 (82), 43–73, 73–19 (57)
99	Highest break	108
0	Century breaks	1
5	50+ breaks	4

== Century breaks ==
(Including qualifying rounds)

- 142 – Antony Bolsover
- 142, 111 – Lee Grant
- 140, 139, 131, 112, 108 – Stephen Hendry
- 132 – Bill Oliver
- 130 – Troy Shaw
- 128 – Terry Griffiths
- 128 – Alan McManus
- 126 – Silvino Francisco
- 125 – Nick Dyson
- 125 – Oliver King
- 124 – Dene O'Kane
- 122 – Steve Russell
- 120 – Micky Wareham
- 118 – Bradley Jones
- 114, 104, 102 – Paul Cavney
- 114 – Paul McPhillips
- 114 – Jimmy White
- 113 – Anthony Hamilton
- 113 – James Wattana
- 112 – Stephen Murphy
- 112 – John Rees
- 111 – Leigh Griffin
- 111 – Jamie Woodman
- 107 – Euan Henderson
- 104 – Sean Lanigan
- 104, 100 – Steve Mifsud
- 104 – Jim Wych
- 103 – Brian Cakebread
- 102 – Karl Broughton
- 102 – Gary Lees
- 101 – Dave Harold
- 101 – Stefan Mazrocis
- 100 – David Langton
- 100 – Willie Thorne
