= 1993 European League =

Matchroom European League
Tournament information
- Dates: 3 January – 30 May 1993
- Country: United Kingdom
- Organisation: Matchroom Sport
- Format: Non-ranking event
- Winner's share: £25,000

Final
- Champion: (England) Jimmy White
- Runner-up: (Scotland) Alan McManus
- Score: 10–7

The 1993 Matchroom European League was a professional non-ranking snooker tournament that was played from 3 January to 30 May 1993.

Jimmy White won in the final 10–7 against Alan McManus.

== League phase ==
Ranking		(England) DAV	(England) WHI	(England) PAR	(Scotland) MCM	(Thailand) WAT	(England) OSU	(England) EBD	Frame W-L	Match W-D-L	Pld-Pts
1	Steve Davis	x	5	5	5	7	4	6	32–16	5–1–0	6–5
2	Jimmy White	3	x	5	5	5	4	7	29–19	4–1–1	6–4
3	John Parrott	3	3	x	7	4	5	5	27–21	3–1–2	6–3
4	Alan McManus	3	3	1	x	7	5	x	19–21	2–0–3	6–2
5	James Wattana	1	3	4	1	x	6	4	19–29	1–2–3	6–1
6	Ronnie O'Sullivan	4	4	3	3	2	x	4	20–28	0–3–3	6–0
7	Peter Ebdon	2	1	3	x	4	4	x	14–26	0–2–3	6–0

Top four qualified for the play-offs. If points were level then most frames won determined their positions. If two players had an identical record then the result in their match determined their positions. If that ended 4–4 then the player who got to four first was higher.

- 3 January – Swindon
  - Jimmy White 5–3 John Parrott
  - Steve Davis 6–2 Peter Ebdon
- 16 January – Tongeren
  - Steve Davis 5–3 John Parrott
  - James Wattana 6–2 Ronnie O'Sullivan
- 17 January – Hamburg
  - Steve Davis 5–3 Alan McManus
  - Ronnie O'Sullivan 4–4 Jimmy White
- 6 February – Salisbury City Hall, Salisbury
  - Steve Davis 5–3 Jimmy White
  - Alan McManus 7–1 James Wattana
- 20 February – Augsburg
  - James Wattana 4–4 John Parrott
  - Jimmy White 5–3 Alan McManus
- 21 February – Augsburg
  - John Parrott 5–3 Peter Ebdon?
  - Jimmy White 5–3 James Wattana
- 7 March – The Hawth, Crawley
  - Jimmy White 7–1 Peter Ebdon
  - Alan McManus 5–3 Ronnie O'Sullivan
  - Peter Ebdon 4–4 Ronnie O'Sullivan
- 12 April – Stevenage Leisure Centre, Stevenage
  - Peter Ebdon 4–4 James Wattana
  - Ronnie O'Sullivan 4–4 Steve Davis
- 9 May – Warwick Arts Centre, Coventry
  - Steve Davis 7–1 James Wattana
  - John Parrott 7–1 Alan McManus
- 23 May – Oval Sports Centre, Bebington
  - John Parrott 5–3 Ronnie O'Sullivan
  - Peter Ebdon vs. Alan McManus (not played after McManus had an ankle injury)

== Play-offs ==
29–30 May (Thornbury Leisure Centre, Bristol, England)

Semi-finals; Best of 11 frames
1	(England) Steve Davis	2
4	(Scotland) Alan McManus	6
2	(England) Jimmy White	6
3	(England) John Parrott	3

Final; Best of 19 frames
4	(Scotland) Alan McManus	7
2	(England) Jimmy White	10
