= 2013 World Seniors Championship =

Tournament information
- Dates: 19–20 October 2013
- Venue: Mountbatten Centre
- City: Portsmouth
- Country: England
- Organisation: WPBSA
- Format: Seniors event
- Total prize fund: £50,000
- Winner's share: £18,000
- Highest break: (England) Steve Davis (94)

Final
- Champion: (England) Steve Davis
- Runner-up: (England) Nigel Bond
- Score: 2–1

The 2013 World Seniors Championship (Known for sponsorship reasons as the 888casino World Seniors Championship) was a snooker tournament that took place between 19 and 20 October 2013 at the Mountbatten Centre in Portsmouth, England.

Steve Davis won the event by defeating defending champion Nigel Bond 2–1 in the final.

== Prize fund ==
The breakdown of prize money for this year is shown below:

- Winner: £18,000
- Runner-up: £8,000
- Semi-finalist: £4,000
- Quarter-finalist: £2,000
- Last 16: £1,000
- Total: £50,000

== Main draw ==
The draw for the last 16 was made on 12 August 2013 at the Doncaster Dome in Doncaster during the qualifying stage of the 2013 Indian Open. The draw for the quarter-finals and semi-finals was made on a random basis. All matches were best of 3 frames and all frames were subject to a 30-second shot clock after ten minutes of play. All times are BST. The highest break of the tournament was 94 made by Steve Davis.

=== Last 16 ===
- Saturday, 19 October – 13:00
  - (New Zealand) Dene O'Kane 0–2 (England) Nigel Bond
  - (England) Tony Knowles 1–2 (Wales) Darren Morgan
  - (Malta) Tony Drago 0–2 (England) Dave Harold
  - (England) Steve Davis 2–0 (Northern Ireland) Dennis Taylor
- Saturday, 19 October – 19:00
  - (Wales) Doug Mountjoy 0–2 (England) Jimmy White
  - (Canada) Alain Robidoux 1–2 (Wales) Tony Chappel
  - (Canada) Cliff Thorburn 2–0 (Wales) Philip Williams
  - (England) Joe Johnson 0–2 (Scotland) Stephen Hendry

=== Quarter-finals ===
- Sunday, 20 October – 13:00
  - (Canada) Cliff Thorburn 1–2 (England) Nigel Bond
  - (Wales) Darren Morgan 0–2 (England) Dave Harold
  - (Wales) Tony Chappel 1–2 (England) Steve Davis
  - (England) Jimmy White 1–2 (Scotland) Stephen Hendry

=== Semi-finals ===
- Sunday, 20 October – 19:00
  - (England) Dave Harold 1–2 (England) Steve Davis
  - (Scotland) Stephen Hendry 0–2 (England) Nigel Bond

=== Final ===
- Sunday, 20 October – 19:00
  - (England) Steve Davis 2–1 (England) Nigel Bond

== Qualifying ==
These matches were held on 3 October 2013 at the Barnsley Metrodome in Barnsley, England. There was only one century break during the qualifying. Philip Williams made a 100 break against Karl Townsend.

Round 1 Best of 3 frames
(England) Jimmy O'Shea	0
(Republic of Ireland) John McBride	2
(England) Sean Lanigan	w/o
(Scotland) Guilio Rea	w/d
(England) Anthony Harris	w/d
(England) Bill Oliver	w/o
(England) Mike Hallett	1
(England) Steve Ventham	2

Round 2 Best of 3 frames
(Republic of Ireland) John Leahy	2
(Republic of Ireland) John McBride	0
(England) Ashley Beal	1
(England) Surinder Gill	2
(England) Gary Miller	0
(England) Dave Harold	2
(England) Andrew Milliard	0
(England) Sean Lanigan	2
(England) Paul Stockwell	1
(England) Nigel Gilbert	2
(England) Hassan Vaizie	2
(England) Bill Oliver	0
(England) Robert Marshall	w/d
(England) Dean Reynolds	w/o
(Wales) Wayne Jones	2
(England) Steve Ventham	0

Round 3 Best of 3 frames
(Republic of Ireland) John Leahy	2
(England) Surinder Gill	1
(England) Dave Harold	2
(England) Sean Lanigan	0
(England) Nigel Gilbert	1
(England) Hassan Vaizie	2
(England) Dean Reynolds	0
(Wales) Wayne Jones	2

Round 4 Best of 3 frames
(Republic of Ireland) John Leahy	0
(England) Dave Harold	2
(England) Hassan Vaizie	0
(Wales) Wayne Jones	2

Round 5 Best of 3 frames
(England) Dave Harold	2
(Wales) Wayne Jones	0

Round 1 Best of 3 frames
(England) Tony Jones	0
(Wales) Darren Thompson	2
(England) Bill Kelly	0
(England) Stefan Mazrocis	2
(Scotland) John Rea	w/d
(England) Les Dodd	w/o
(England) Gary Filtness	0
(England) Roger Leighton	2
(England) Steven Gough	1
(England) Ian Barry Stark	2
(England) Stephen Meakin	1
(England) Gary Wilkinson	2

Round 2 Best of 3 frames
(England) Nick Pearce	1
(Wales) Darren Thompson	2
(Jersey) Gabriel Burns	2
(England) Stefan Mazrocis	1
(England) Barry West	1
(England) Les Dodd	2
(England) John Welsh	0
(England) Roger Leighton	2
(England) Tony Brown	2
(Republic of Ireland) Dessie Sheehan	1
(Republic of Ireland) Patsy Fagan	2
(England) Ian Barry Stark	0
(Wales) Philip Williams	2
(England) Gary Wilkinson	0
(England) Ali Bassiri	0
(England) Karl Townsend	2

Round 3 Best of 3 frames
(Wales) Darren Thompson	2
(Jersey) Gabriel Burns	1
(England) Les Dodd	2
(England) Roger Leighton	1
(England) Tony Brown	0
(Republic of Ireland) Patsy Fagan	2
(Wales) Philip Williams	2
(England) Karl Townsend	0

Round 4 Best of 3 frames
(Wales) Darren Thompson	0
(England) Les Dodd	2
(Republic of Ireland) Patsy Fagan	0
(Wales) Philip Williams	2

Round 5 Best of 3 frames
(England) Les Dodd	0
(Wales) Philip Williams	2
