= 2012 World Seniors Championship =

Tournament information
- Dates: 27–28 October 2012
- Venue: Mountbatten Centre
- City: Portsmouth
- Country: England
- Organisation: WPBSA
- Format: Seniors event
- Total prize fund: £50,000
- Winner's share: £18,000
- Highest break: (England) Karl Townsend (86)

Final
- Champion: (England) Nigel Bond
- Runner-up: (Wales) Tony Chappel
- Score: 2–0

The 2012 World Seniors Championship (Known for sponsorship reasons as the Wyldecrest Park Homes World Seniors Championship) was a professional non-ranking snooker tournament that took place between 27 and 28 October 2012 at the Mountbatten Centre in Portsmouth, England.

Darren Morgan was the defending champion, but he lost in the semi-finals 0–2 against Nigel Bond.

Bond won in the final 2–0 against Tony Chappel. Bond won 14 frames in a row by beating all of his opponents with 2–0.

== Prize fund ==
The breakdown of prize money for this year is shown below:

- Winner: £18,000
- Runner-up: £8,000
- Semi-finalist: £4,000
- Quarter-finalist: £2,000
- Last 16: £1,000
- Total: £50,000

== Main draw ==
The draw for the last 16 was made on the evening of 13 September 2012 at The Sands in Carlisle during the Premier League. The draw for the quarter-finals and semi-finals was made on a random basis. All matches were best of 3 frames. The times for 27 October are BST and those for 28 October are GMT. The highest break of the tournament was 86 made by Karl Townsend.

=== Last 16 ===
- Saturday, 27 October – 13:00
  - (Wales) Darren Morgan 2–0 (England) Joe Johnson
  - (Northern Ireland) Dennis Taylor 0–2 (England) Nigel Bond
  - (New Zealand) Dene O'Kane 2–0 (England) Barry West
  - (England) Steve Davis 2–1 (Canada) Cliff Thorburn
- Saturday, 27 October – 19:00
  - (Malta) Tony Drago 1–2 (Wales) Tony Chappel
  - (England) Karl Townsend 1–2 (England) Tony Knowles
  - (Canada) Alain Robidoux 2–0 (England) Les Dodd
  - (England) Jimmy White 2–0 (England) Mike Hallett

=== Quarter-finals ===
- Sunday, 28 October – 13:00
  - (England) Steve Davis 0–2 (Wales) Darren Morgan
  - (New Zealand) Dene O'Kane 2–1 (England) Jimmy White
  - (Canada) Alain Robidoux 0–2 (Wales) Tony Chappel
  - (England) Tony Knowles 0–2 (England) Nigel Bond

=== Semi-finals ===
- Sunday, 28 October – 19:00
  - (England) Nigel Bond 2–0 (Wales) Darren Morgan
  - (Wales) Tony Chappel 2–1 (New Zealand) Dene O'Kane

=== Final ===
- Sunday, 28 October – 19:00
  - (England) Nigel Bond 2–0 (Wales) Tony Chappel

== Qualifying ==
These matches took place on 30 September 2012 at the World Snooker Academy, Sheffield, England. There was only one century break during the qualifying. Nigel Bond made a 101 against Gary Wilkinson.

Round 1 Best of 3 frames		Round 2 Best of 3 frames		Round 3 Best of 3 frames
		(Scotland) Giulio Rae	0
(England) Stephen Meakin	2	(England) Stephen Meakin	2
(Republic of Ireland) Dessie Sheehan	0			(England) Stephen Meakin	1
(Scotland) John Rea	0			(England) Les Dodd	2
(England) Bill Oliver	2	(England) Bill Oliver	0
(England) Andrew Milliard	0	(England) Les Dodd	2
(England) Les Dodd	2

Round 1 Best of 3 frames
(Republic of Ireland) John Leahy	1
(England) Steve Ventham	2
(England) Gary Wilkinson	2
(England) Dean Reynolds	0
(England) Nigel Bond	2
(Australia) Peter Williams	0

Round 2 Best of 3 frames
(England) Steve Ventham	0
(England) Gary Wilkinson	2
(England) Steve James	0
(England) Nigel Bond	2

Round 3 Best of 3 frames
(England) Gary Wilkinson	0
(England) Nigel Bond	2

Round 1 Best of 3 frames
(England) Gary Miller	2
(England) Jimmy O'Shea	1
(England) Dave Harold	0
(England) Ian Brumby	2
(England) Ashley Beal	0
(England) Barry West	2

Round 2 Best of 3 frames
(England) Gary Miller	0
(England) Ian Brumby	2
(England) David Roe	0
(England) Barry West	2

Round 3 Best of 3 frames
(England) Ian Brumby	0
(England) Barry West	2

Round 1 Best of 3 frames		Round 2 Best of 3 frames		Round 3 Best of 3 frames
		(England) Nigel Gilbert	1
(England) Tony Brown	1	(Republic of Ireland) Patsy Fagan	2
(Republic of Ireland) Patsy Fagan	2			(Republic of Ireland) Patsy Fagan	0
(England) Ian Barry Stark	2			(Wales) Tony Chappel	2
(Wales) Wayne Jones	1	(England) Ian Barry Stark	1
(Wales) Tony Chappel	2	(Wales) Tony Chappel	2
(Netherlands) Stefan Mazrocis	0
