= 2011 World Seniors Championship =

Tournament information
- Dates: 5–6 November 2011
- Venue: East of England Showground
- City: Peterborough
- Country: England
- Organisation: WPBSA
- Format: Seniors event
- Total prize fund: £53,000
- Winner's share: £18,000
- Highest break: (Wales) Darren Morgan (86)

Final
- Champion: (Wales) Darren Morgan
- Runner-up: (England) Steve Davis
- Score: 2–1

The 2011 World Seniors Championship (known for sponsorship reasons as the Wyldecrest Park Homes World Seniors Championship) was a snooker tournament that took place between 5–6 November 2011 at the East of England Showground in Peterborough, England. The age criterion was raised from 40 to 45 compared to 2010.

Jimmy White was the defending champion, but he lost in the semi-finals 0–2 against Darren Morgan.

Darren Morgan won in the final 2–1 against Steve Davis. During the final Morgan also made the highest break of the tournament, an 86 in the penultimate frame.

== Prize fund ==
The breakdown of prize money for this year is shown below:
Winner: £18,000
Runner-up: £8,000
Semi-finalist: £4,000
Quarter-finalist: £2,000
Last 16: £1,000
Round 3: £750

Total: £53,000

== Main draw ==
The draw for the last 16 was made on the evening of 1 September 2011 at the Guildford Spectrum during the Premier League. The draw for quarter-finals and semi-finals were made on a random basis. All matches were best of 3 frames. Matches were played on a roll on/roll off basis. Play started at the allocated time each day with a 15-minute interval between matches, except the final after a 20-minute interval. The evening session didn't start before the time indicated on the format. All frames were subjected to a 30-second shot clock after ten minutes of play and the miss rule was altered so "ball-in-hand" anywhere on the table was awarded after the third miss. All times are GMT.

=== Last 16 ===
- Saturday, 5 November – 13:00
  - (Malta) Tony Drago 1–2 (England) Steve Davis
  - (New Zealand) Dene O'Kane 2–1 (England) Neal Foulds
  - (England) Karl Townsend 2–0 (England) Steve Ventham
  - (England) John Parrott 2–1 (England) Joe Johnson
- Saturday, 5 November – 19:00
  - (England) Jimmy White 2–0 (England) Tony Knowles
  - (England) Nigel Bond 0–2 (Northern Ireland) Dennis Taylor
  - (England) Gary Wilkinson 0–2 (Wales) Darren Morgan
  - (Canada) Cliff Thorburn 2–1 (Wales) Doug Mountjoy^{[a1]}

=== Quarter-finals ===
- Sunday, 6 November – 13:00
  - (New Zealand) Dene O'Kane 0–2 (England) Steve Davis
  - (Wales) Darren Morgan 2–0 (Canada) Cliff Thorburn
  - (Northern Ireland) Dennis Taylor 0–2 (England) Jimmy White
  - (England) John Parrott 2–1 (England) Karl Townsend

=== Semi-finals ===
- Sunday, 6 November – 19:00
  - (England) Steve Davis 2–0 (England) John Parrott
  - (England) Jimmy White 0–2 (Wales) Darren Morgan

=== Final ===
- Sunday, 6 November – 19:00
  - (England) Steve Davis 1–2 (Wales) Darren Morgan

== Qualifying ==
These matches took place on 10 October 2011 at the South West Snooker Academy, Gloucester, England. There was only one century break during the qualifying. Tony Chappel made a 101 break against David Taylor.

Round 1 Best of 3 frames		Round 2 Best of 3 frames		Round 3 Best of 3 frames
		(England) Barry Stark	2
(England) John Welsh	0	(England) Ian Brumby	0
(England) Ian Brumby	2			(England) Barry Stark	1
(England) Andrew Milliard	2			(England) Steve Ventham	2
(Wales) Steve Newbury	1	(England) Andrew Milliard	0
(England) Dean Reynolds	1	(England) Steve Ventham	2
(England) Steve Ventham	2

Round 1 Best of 3 frames
(England) David Roe	2
(Republic of Ireland) Patsy Fagan	0
(England) Les Dodd	2
(England) Tony Brown	0
(England) Kevin Uzzell	1
(England) Mike Hallett	2

Round 2 Best of 3 frames
(England) David Roe	2
(England) Les Dodd	0
(Wales) Darren Morgan	2
(England) Mike Hallett	0

Round 3 Best of 3 frames
(England) David Roe	0
(Wales) Darren Morgan	2

Round 1 Best of 3 frames		Round 2 Best of 3 frames		Round 3 Best of 3 frames
		(Republic of Ireland) John McBride	0
(England) Karl Townsend	2	(England) Karl Townsend	2
(India) David Singh	1			(England) Karl Townsend	2
(England) Stephen Meakin	2			(England) Stephen Meakin	0
(Wales) Wayne Jones	0	(England) Stephen Meakin	2
(Republic of Ireland) Dessie Sheehan	1	(England) Ali Bassiri	0
(England) Ali Bassiri	2

Round 1 Best of 3 frames
(England) David Taylor	2
(England) Christopher Flight	0
(England) Jimmy O'Shea	1
(Wales) Tony Chappel	2
(England) Gary Miller	0
(England) Gary Wilkinson	2

Round 2 Best of 3 frames
(England) David Taylor	0
(Wales) Tony Chappel	2
(England) Gary Wilkinson
Bye^{[a2]}

Round 3 Best of 3 frames
(Wales) Tony Chappel	1
(England) Gary Wilkinson	2

== Notes ==
- ^{a1} ^{a2} After Alain Robidoux withdrew from the competition, due to an ear operation, Doug Mountjoy was handed a place in the final stages of the competition and the winner of the match between Gary Miller and Gary Wilkinson received a bye into the last qualifying round.
