= Accles-Turrell =

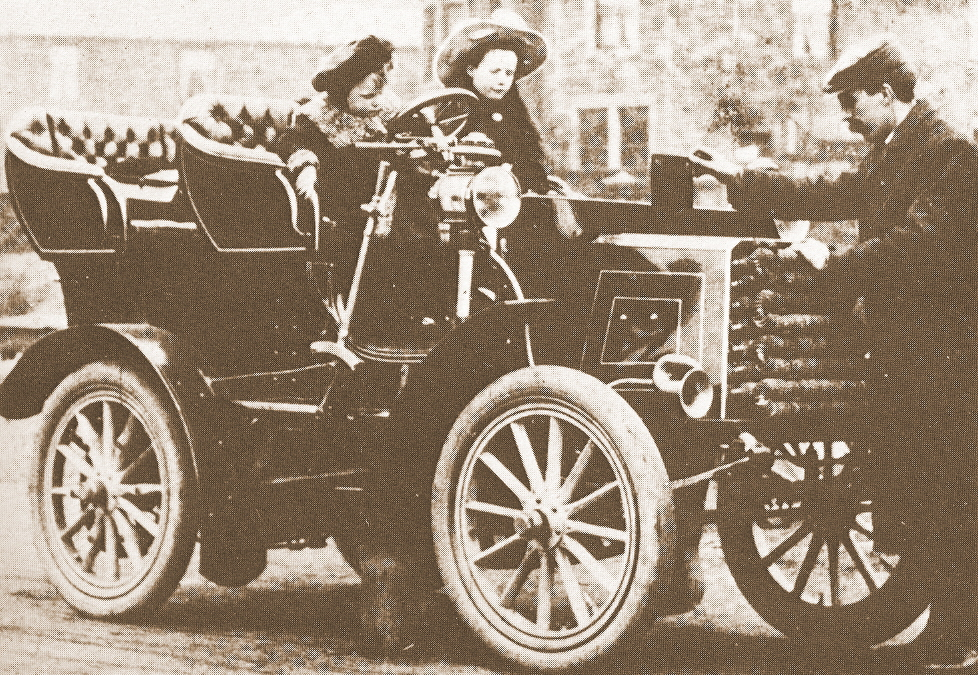
Accles-Turrell 10/15 HP (1901)

The Accles-Turrell was an English automobile built between 1899 and 1901 in Perry Bar, Birmingham, England and from 1901 to 1902 in Ashton-under-Lyne.

The company began in 1899 when the British pioneer motorist Charles McRobie Turrell, who had helped organise the 1896 London-Brighton Emancipation Run, joined Accles Ltd, a Birmingham engineering company. The car was a 3 hp two-seater light carriage equipped with a single-cylinder engine of Accles manufacture and a body by Arthur Mulliner of Northampton. The engine drove the rear wheels by a belt to the 3-speed gearbox and chain to the wheels. The top speed was claimed to be 20 mph (32 km/h).

In 1901, a larger four-seat 10/15 hp car was made, and the rights to this "vibrationless, very simple, quiet and efficient" "New Turrell" car were acquired by Pollock Ltd. of Ashton-under-Lyne. The car had a flat twin 10/15 hp engine under the front seat, driving the rear wheels through a two-speed constant mesh gearbox. The car was later made by the Autocar Construction Company and sold as the Hermes.

Accles and Pollock soon joined forces to become the tube-making company Accles & Pollock. The Accles & Pollock tube brand is currently owned by Tyco.

== See also ==
- List of car manufacturers of the United Kingdom
- The Coventry Motor Company
