= World Seniors Championship =

Invitational snooker tournament for players 40+

Tournament information
- Location: Scunthorpe (2017–2018); Crucible Theatre, Sheffield (2019–present)
- Country: England
- Established: 1991
- Organisation(s): WPBSA (1991, 2010–2016, 2019–present); Snooker Legends (2017–2018)
- Format: Seniors event
- Total prize fund: £50,000
- Current champion: Ronnie O’Sullivan (ENG)

The World Seniors Championship is an invitational seniors snooker tournament which has been played under different formats. As of 2020 the minimum age is 40, but it was 45 in 2011 and 2012.

== History ==
The event was first held in 1991 with 16 players aged over 40. It took place at the Trentham Gardens in Stoke-on-Trent with the sponsorship of Matchroom. The final was contested between the two highest ranked players, with Cliff Wilson defeating Eddie Charlton 5–4 to become the inaugural champion. The event was revived in 2010, but the field was reduced to 9 players and was played in Bradford. The event was sponsored by Wyldecrest Park Homes, who remained the sponsor until 2012.

In 2011 event the minimum age for competitors was increased from 40 to 45 years, and it was moved to the East of England Showground in Peterborough. All matches were best of 3 frames, a 30-second shot clock was introduced after ten minutes of play, and the miss rule was altered so ball-in-hand was awarded anywhere on table after the third miss. The field was increased to 16 players, with 12 being invited and four coming through qualifying. In 2012 the event was moved to the Mountbatten Centre in Portsmouth. In 2013 the number of qualifying spots was reduced to two, and the event was sponsored by 888casino.com. Stephen Hendry became eligible to compete at tournament, because he turned 45 during the 2013/2014 season. In the 2014/2015 season the event was moved to the second half of the season, and held at Circus Arena in Blackpool. The minimum age for the event returned to 40 years. All former World Seniors Champions and World Snooker Champions, who registered for the event, were seeded through to Blackpool, and the remaining places were filled through a qualifying event.

In 2017 and 2018 it was held for non-tour players aged 40 or over at the beginning of the year.

From 2019 the tournament was opened back up to players on the main tour who were over 40 but ranked outside the top 64 in the world rankings. The tournament was played at the Crucible Theatre in Sheffield.

For 2024-25, the minimum age for players on the main tour but outside the top 64 was reverted to 45 years. The minimum age for amateurs was retained at 40 years.

== Winners ==
Year	Winner	Runner-up	Result	Venue	Season
1991	Cliff Wilson (WAL)	Eddie Charlton (AUS)	5–4	Trentham Gardens, Stoke-on-Trent	91–92
2010	Jimmy White (ENG)	Steve Davis (ENG)	4–1	Cedar Court Hotel, Bradford	10–11
2011	Darren Morgan (WAL)	Steve Davis (ENG)	2–1	East of England Showground, Peterborough	11–12
2012	Nigel Bond (ENG)	Tony Chappel (WAL)	2–0	Mountbatten Centre, Portsmouth	12–13
2013	Steve Davis (ENG)	Nigel Bond (ENG)	2–1	Mountbatten Centre, Portsmouth	13–14
2015	Mark Williams (WAL)	Fergal O'Brien (IRL)	2–1	Circus Arena, Blackpool	14–15
2016	Mark Davis (ENG)	Darren Morgan (WAL)	2–1	Guild Hall, Preston	15–16
2017	Peter Lines (ENG)	John Parrott (ENG)	4–0	Baths Hall, Scunthorpe	16–17
2018	Aaron Canavan (JER)	Patrick Wallace (NIR)	4–3	Baths Hall, Scunthorpe	17–18
2019	Jimmy White (ENG)	Darren Morgan (WAL)	5–3	Crucible Theatre, Sheffield	19–20
2020	Jimmy White (ENG)	Ken Doherty (IRL)	5–4	Crucible Theatre, Sheffield	19–20
2021	David Lilley (ENG)	Jimmy White (ENG)	5–3	Crucible Theatre, Sheffield	20–21
2022	Lee Walker (WAL)	Jimmy White (ENG)	5–4	Crucible Theatre, Sheffield	21–22
2023	Jimmy White (ENG)	Alfie Burden (ENG)	5–3	Crucible Theatre, Sheffield	22–23
2024	Igor Figueiredo (BRA)	Ken Doherty (IRL)	5–2	Crucible Theatre, Sheffield	23–24
2025	Alfie Burden (ENG)	Aaron Canavan (JER)	8‍–‍4	Crucible Theatre, Sheffield	24–25
2026	Ronnie O'Sullivan (ENG)	Joe Perry (ENG)	10‍–‍4	Crucible Theatre, Sheffield	25–26

== Multiple finalists ==
Name	Nationality	Winner	Runner-up	Finals
Jimmy White	England	4	2	6
Steve Davis	England	1	2	3
Darren Morgan	Wales	1	2	3
Nigel Bond	England	1	1	2
Aaron Canavan	Jersey	1	1	2
Alfie Burden	England	1	1	2
Ken Doherty	Ireland	0	2	2

== Century breaks ==
Total: 38 (as of 2026 Championship)

- 140 – Mark Williams
- 138, 132, 130, 103 – Jimmy White
- 137 – Mark Davis
- 134, 112 – Darren Morgan
- 131, 128, 109, 107, 104, 101 – Dominic Dale
- 131, 129, 113, 109, 109, 100 – Ronnie O'Sullivan
- 131 – Ali Carter
- 127 – Stuart Bingham
- 121 – Lee Walker
- 119, 110, 100 – Igor Figueiredo
- 116 – Ben Hancorn
- 113 – James Wattana
- 110, 105 – Fergal O'Brien
- 110 – Doug Mountjoy
- 109, 101 – Alfie Burden
- 108 – Alex Higgins
- 103 – Eddie Charlton
- 102, 100 – Ken Doherty
- 102 – Joe Perry
