= Seddon Mayfly =

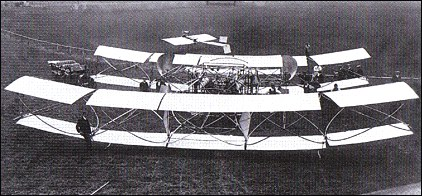

General information
- Type: Experimental aircraft
- Manufacturer: Accles & Pollock, Oldbury
- Designer: Lieutenant John Wilfred Seddon, A G Hackett
- Number built: 1

The Seddon Mayfly was a tandem biplane of unusual construction. It was designed by Royal Navy Lieutenant John W. Seddon and A. G. Hackett and built by Accles & Pollock. When built it was the largest aeroplane in the world, but it failed to fly when tested.

== Design and development ==
Design of the Seddon Mayfly began in 1908, with the intention of attempting to win the prize for a flight between Manchester and London given by the Daily Mail. The design was based on a paper model, and Seddon took leave from the Navy to design and build and test the aircraft. It was built in Oldbury by Accles & Pollock, a company who specialised in the manufacture of steel tubing, and its structure made extensive use of intersecting pairs of steel hoops: over 2,000 ft (610 m) of steel was used in its construction The aircraft had two sets of biplane wings, the front pair of greater span than the aft pair. Control surfaces consisted of a forward-mounted biplane elevators and a pair of diamond-shaped rudders mounted between each set of wings. The aircraft was intended to carry five passengers in addition to the pilot.

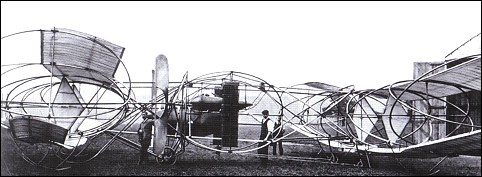
Side view of the Seddon Mayfly circa 1908

It was powered by a pair of 65 hp (48 kW) N.E.C. water-cooled engines mounted side by side between the two sets of wings. Each drove a single Beedle type tractor propeller. These were made of sheet aluminium, with the semi-circular blades supported at the ends by attachment to a radial tube.

It was tested at the Midland Aero Club grounds at Dunstall Park near Wolverhampton but damaged an axle and failed to leave the ground. It was eventually taken apart by souvenir hunters.

== Specifications ==
Data from

General characteristics

- Crew: 1
- Capacity: 5 passengers
- Length: 50 ft (15 m) approx.
- Wingspan: 50 ft (15 m) approx.
- Wing area: 1,000 sq ft (93 m^{2})
- Gross weight: 2,600 lb (1,179 kg)
- Powerplant: 2 × NEC 6-cylinder water-cooled 2-stroke in-line piston engine, 65 hp (48 kW) each
- Propellers: 2-bladed fixed-pitch propellers

Performance
