= Alan McManus =

Scottish professional snooker player, 1994 Masters champion (born 1971)

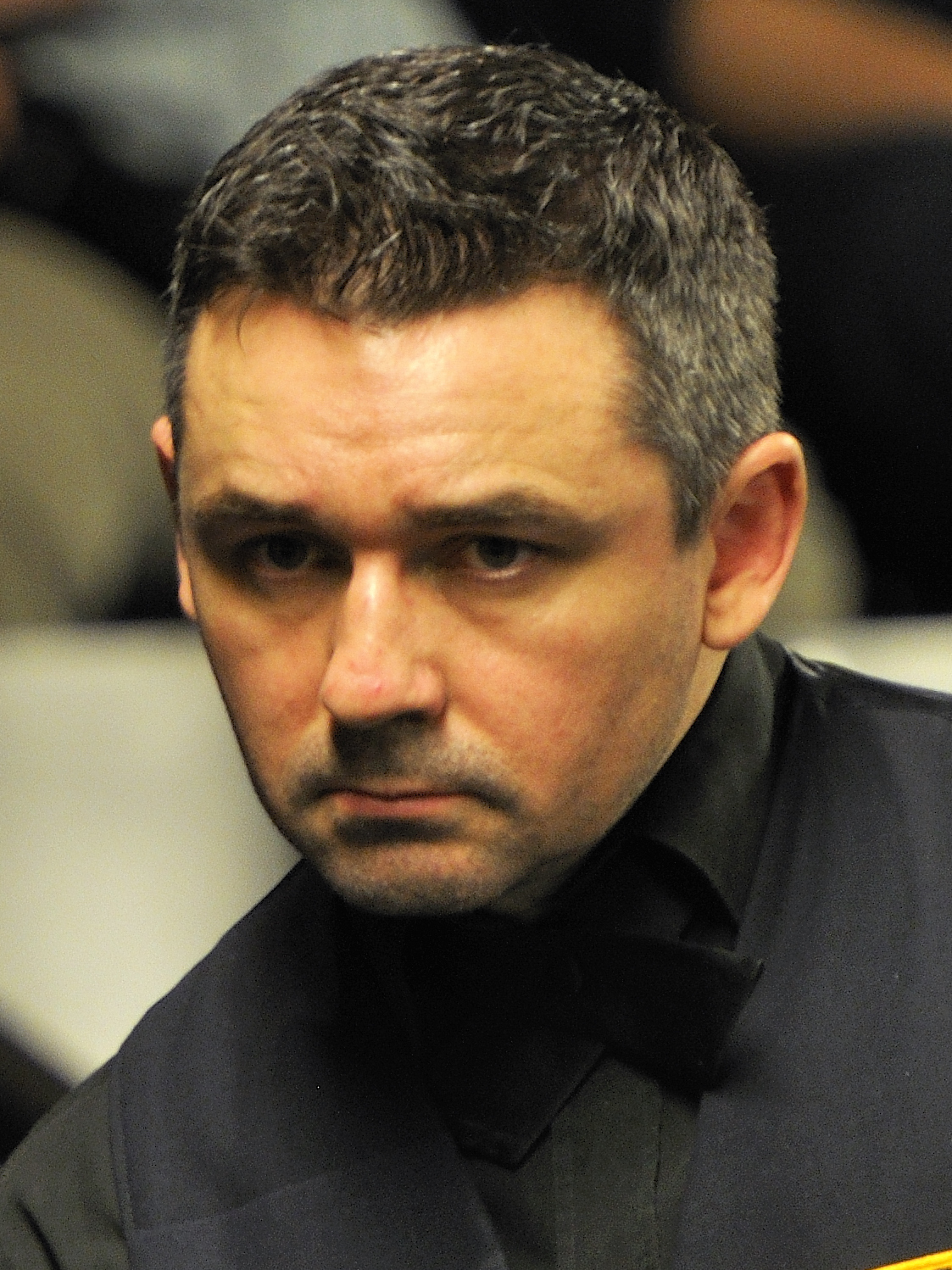
- McManus in 2013

Personal information
- Nickname: Angles
- Born: 21 January 1971 (age 55) Glasgow, Scotland

Sport
- Country: Scotland
- Sport: Snooker
- Professional: 1990–2021
- Highest ranking: 6 (4 years)
- Century breaks: 230

Tournament wins
- Ranking: 2

Alan McManus (born 21 January 1971) is a Scottish retired professional snooker player, and a current commentator and pundit for ITV, BBC and TNT on snooker coverage. A mainstay of the world's top sixteen during the 1990s and 2000s, he has won two ranking events, the 1994 Dubai Classic and the 1996 Thailand Open, and competed in the World Championship semi-finals in 1992, 1993 and 2016. He also won the 1994 Masters, ending Stephen Hendry's five-year, 23-match unbeaten streak at the tournament with a 9–8 victory in the final. McManus announced his retirement on 9 April 2021 after losing 6–3 to Bai Langning in the second qualifying round of the 2021 World Snooker Championship.

== Career ==
=== Top 16 career and Masters winner ===
McManus was a consistent performer on the snooker tour, having a record of fourteen consecutive seasons in the Top 16. He was ranked in the Top 16 from 1992 to 2006, dropping out after an unsuccessful 2005/2006 season. His highest ranking was sixth (in 1993/94 and 1996/97). McManus reached twenty-one professional semi-finals, and won four events. He reached the semi-finals of the World Championship three times, but never appeared in a final. Until 2005, he had gone eleven years without reaching the quarter-finals of the tournament.

At the 1994 Masters, McManus defeated Nigel Bond 5–2 in the first round, Ken Doherty 5–1 in the quarter-finals, and then Neal Foulds 6–4 in the semi-final to set up his first triple crown tournament final against defending champion Stephen Hendry. In what became the highlight of his career, he claimed the Masters title at Wembley, defeating Hendry 9–8 in the final and thus ending Hendry's unbeaten run in the tournament, which dated back to 1989. He also won the tournament's highest-break prize, £10,000 for a 132 total clearance in the sixth frame of his first-round match against Bond.

His last major final was at the 2002 LG Cup, at the Preston Guild Hall, in which he lost 5–9 to Chris Small. He dropped out of the top 16 in the 2005/2006 season, the first time he had done so since 1991. He reached the semi-finals of the 2006 Snooker Grand Prix, losing to Neil Robertson.

=== Dropping out of the top 16 ===
He lost a World Championship qualifier 9–10 to Joe Delaney in 2007. This loss began a quiet six-to-seven-year period for McManus, who then failed to qualify for any UK or World Championships between 2007 and 2013, and also struggled to qualify for the other ranking events (during the period between the 2006 Grand Prix and the 2013 Welsh Open, he failed to qualify for the main stages of 42 ranking events). This loss of form saw him quickly drop out of the top 16, then out of the top 32. His poor form reached a trough in the 2009/2010 season, where he failed to qualify for any of the main stages of the tournaments he took part in.

McManus was unable to qualify for any of the major venues during the 2011–12 season and he finished it ranked as number 52 in the world.

=== Resurgence ===
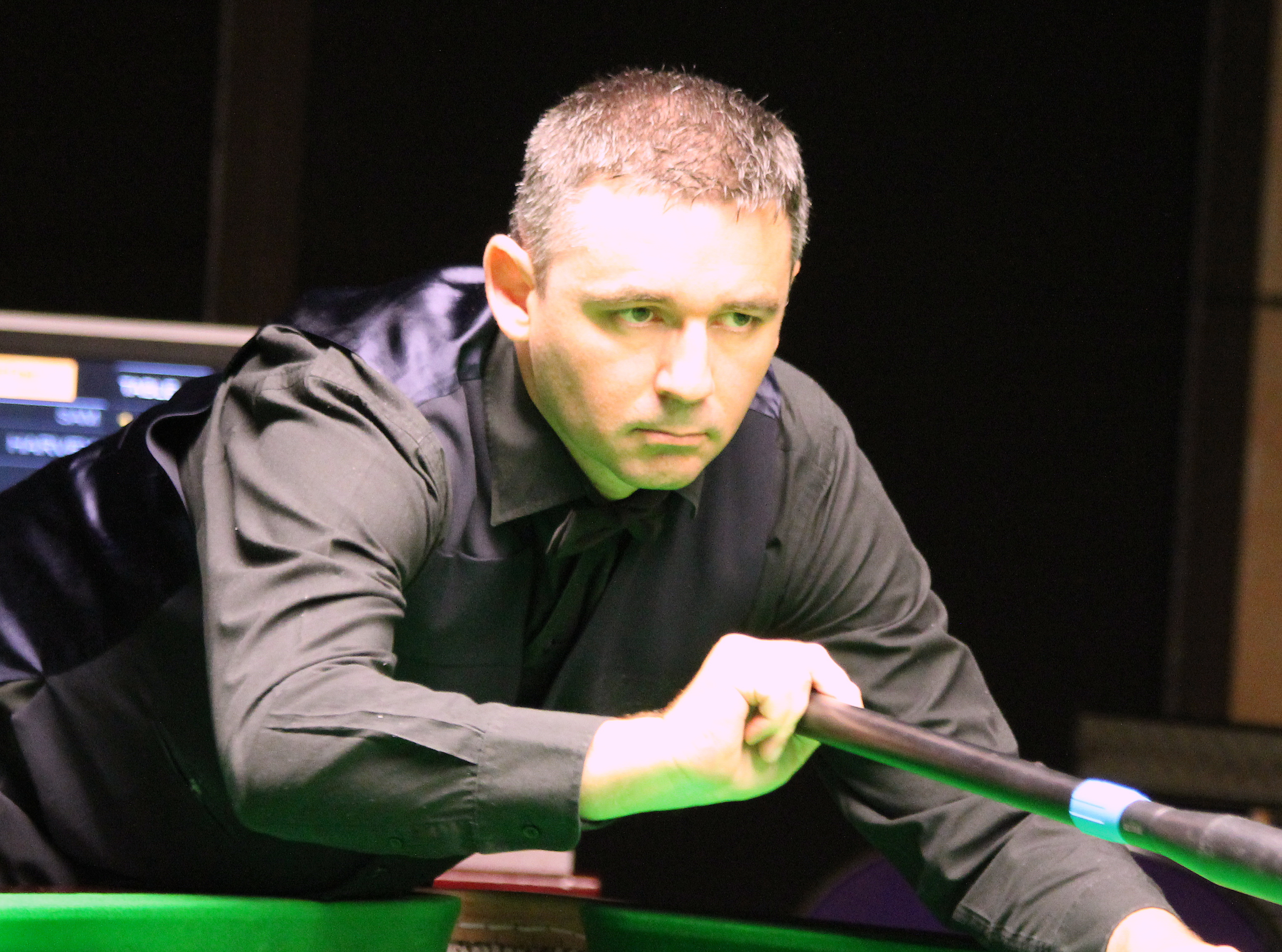
2012 Paul Hunter Classic

He made a good start to the 2012–13 season, beating Tony Drago and Robert Milkins to qualify for the final stages of the Australian Goldfields Open in Bendigo; there he beat local wildcard James Mifsud 5–0, before exiting the tournament by the same scoreline against Ding Junhui. At the 2013 Welsh Open, McManus reached his first quarter-final since the 2006 Grand Prix, with a 4–2 win over the number 16 seed Barry Hawkins, followed by a comeback to beat Joe Perry 4–3, after having trailed 0–3. He was beaten in the quarter-final 3–5 by Stephen Maguire. The following tournament, the Haikou World Open, saw McManus win three matches in qualifying to reach the latter stages of the tournament; he then beat local wildcard Lin Shuai 5–3, before facing John Higgins. McManus lost 3–5, but picked up valuable ranking points in the process.

He made a good start to the Players Tour Championship, reaching the quarter-finals of the first event, losing to Andrew Higginson by 4 frames to 3. He carried this form to the PTC event 2, once again reaching the quarter-finals before losing 1–4 to eventual runner-up Stephen Maguire. McManus only managed four last-32 results from the rest of the events. This led to him being ranked 31st in the Order of Merit, just missing out on the top 28 players that qualified for the finals. At the 2013 World Snooker Championship McManus, in qualifying, beating Aditya Mehta 10–9, in an epic encounter that lasted just over 9 hours. He then defeated 1995 World finalist Nigel Bond 10–8 in the penultimate qualifying round. In the final qualifying round he led Tom Ford 5–4 after the first session; he then reeled off five of the next six frames to book his place at the Crucible Theatre for the first time since 2006. In the first round he lost to Ding Junhui 5–10, winning £12,000.

=== 2013/2014 season ===
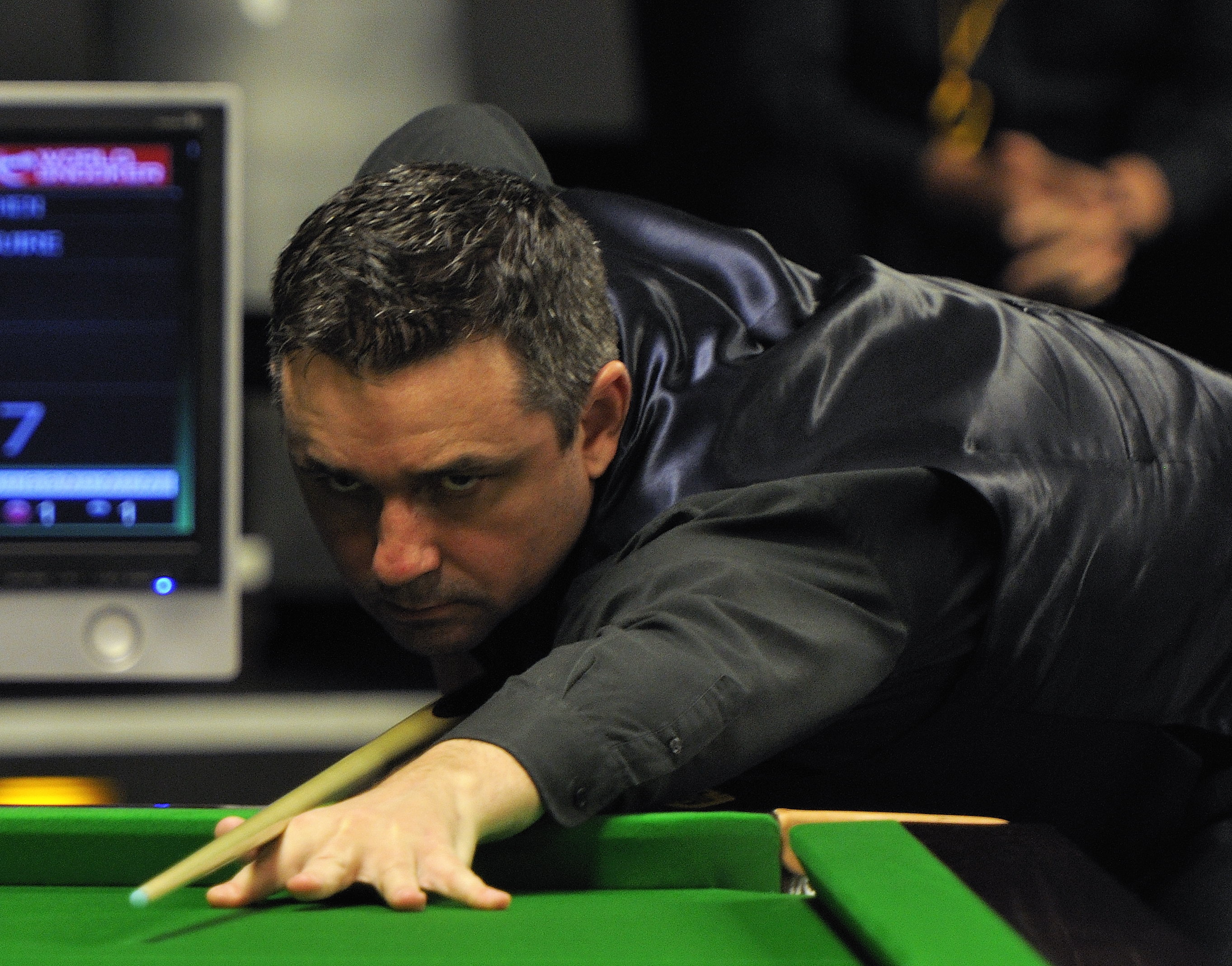
2013 German Masters

At the start of the 2013–14 season McManus was ranked 49th in the World Rankings. At the 2013 Wuxi Classic qualifiers he won his match against Darryl Hill 5–3 to qualify for the last 64 of the event held in Wuxi. At the venue he defeated Ken Doherty 5–3 before losing to Dave Gilbert 2–5. At the first Asian Tour event, he defeated Michael White before beating local favorite Ding Junhui 4–2 in the last 16. He then defeated Yu Delu 4–1 in the quarter-finals, reaching his first semi-final in nine years. In the semi-final he lost to eventual winner Joe Perry 2–4, despite having been 2–1 up.

McManus qualified for the inaugural Indian Open, beating amateur Sydney Wilson 4–1 in qualifying. He was then beaten 1–4 in the last 64 by Zhang Anda. McManus followed up this result by qualifying for the International Championship. He then defeated local wildcard Zhou Yuelong 6–5, coming back from 2–4 down. In the last 64, he produced the shock of the tournament by beating defending champion Judd Trump 6–5, having been 3–4 down. However he was defeated 4–6 by Ryan Day in the following round. At the 2013 UK Championship, McManus defeated Joel Walker 6–5, winning the match on a respotted black, before losing to Michael Holt 4–6 in the last 64. McManus reached the last 16 of the German Masters, defeating Jak Jones 5–1 in qualifying. At the Tempodrom he defeated Peter Ebdon and Jack Lisowski, both by 5–2 scorelines, before being beaten 2–5 by Michael Holt.

McManus continued his good form into the final European Tour event of the season, where he reached the last 16 by defeating players such as Neil Robertson and Graeme Dott before losing to Fergal O'Brien. Despite also reaching the last 16 of the final Asian Tour Event of the season, McManus narrowly missed out on qualification for the Players Championship Grand Final by one place. He lost to Mark King in the second round of the Welsh Open and failed to qualify for the China Open, but was to finish the season strongly. He reached the quarter-final of the World Open, losing to Mark Selby.

The 2014 World Snooker Championship, saw McManus beat John Higgins 10–7 in the first round and then defeat Ken Doherty 13–8, to set up another quarter-final with Mark Selby. McManus performed well early on, but Selby ran away with the match in the second session to leave the Scot trailing 4–12. McManus was able to claw back the first frame of the final session but Selby won the next frame to win the match 13–5.

=== 2014/2015 season ===
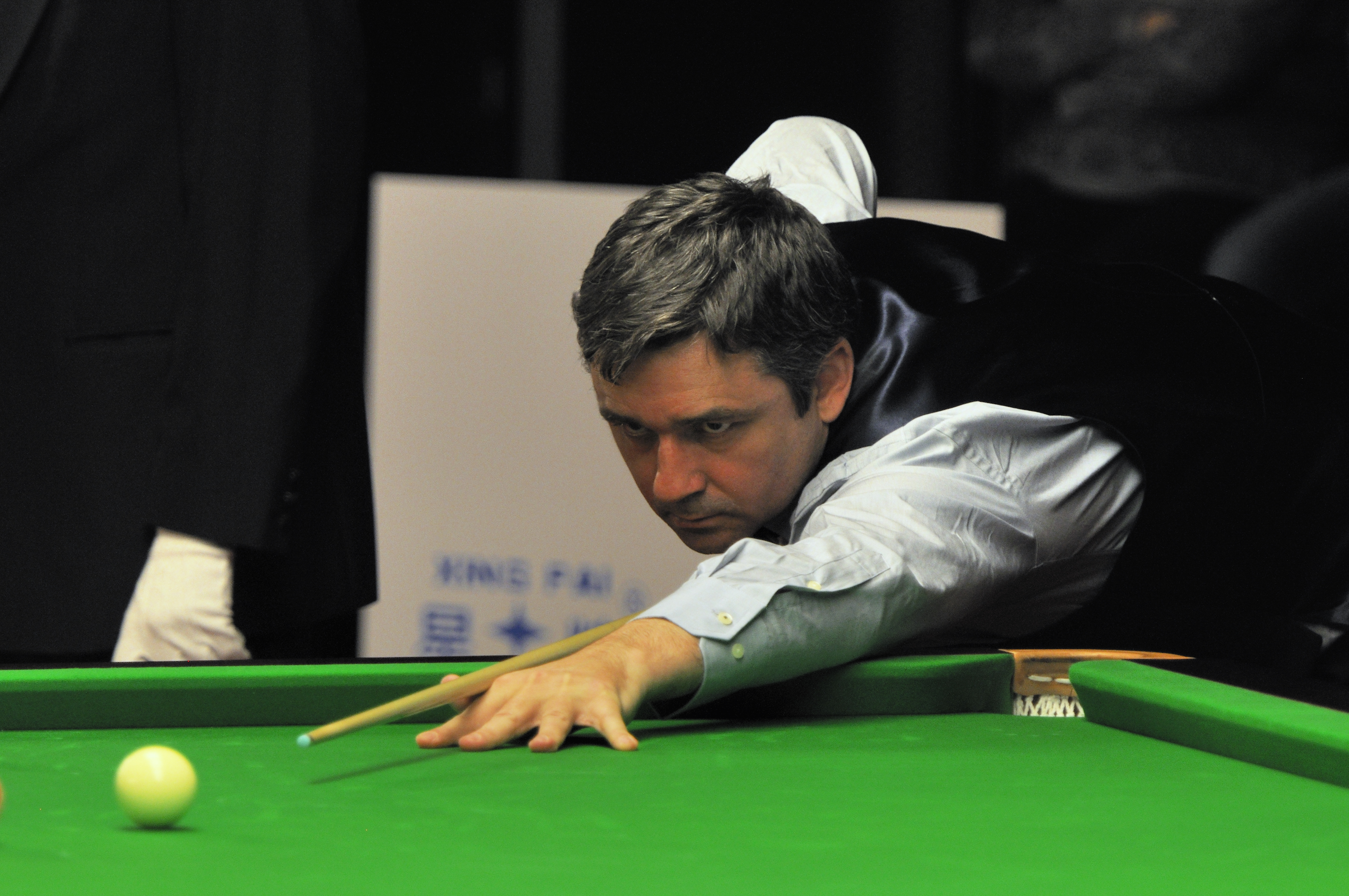
2014 German Masters

McManus continued his good form into the 2014–15 season by reaching the last 16 of the first ranking event of the season, the 2014 Wuxi Classic, where he was beaten 2–5 by Barry Hawkins. He then reached the last 16 of the Australian Goldfields Open, before losing 3–5 to Judd Trump. McManus reached the quarter-finals of the Shanghai Masters by beating Jamie Jones to qualify, before defeating Ronnie O'Sullivan 5–3 and Stephen Maguire 5–1 but then lost to the eventual winner of the tournament Stuart Bingham 1–5. McManus was able to keep up his 100% record in qualifying matches for the season by defeating Michael Georgiou to qualify for the International Championship, but was edged out by Anthony McGill in the last 64 of the tournament.

McManus lost in the first round of the UK Championship to Joel Walker. He won his first qualifier for the 2015 German Masters against Zak Surety but was then defeated in the final qualifying round by Matthew Selt. In the Welsh Open, McManus reached the last 16 before losing to Maguire. He performed well in the season's European Tour Events, finishing 18th on the Order of Merit. He played in four of the six events, reaching one quarter-final with a further three last 16 appearances. This gave him entry into the Grand Final where he was defeated 1–4 by Bingham in the first round. McManus won all three of his World Championship qualifying matches, defeating Michael Wasley, Andrew Pagett and Mitchell Mann to reach the main draw at the Crucible. He played against Ali Carter, and McManus bowed out 5–10 in the first round.

=== 2015/2016 season ===
McManus started strongly in the 2015–16 season, reaching the quarter-finals of the first event, the Riga Open, with wins over Maguire, Trump and others before losing to the eventual champion Hawkins 2–4. As McManus did not enter the Australian Goldfields Open, his first ranking event of the season came at the Shanghai Masters. He defeated Rory McLeod 5–4 to qualify for the tournament, and then defeated wildcard Yao Pengcheng 5–2, before losing 1–5 to Ding Junhui.

After an early exit in the Paul Hunter Classic, McManus reached the quarter-finals of the Ruhr Open, losing 3–4 to Tian Pengfei. It was during his first-round match in this tournament that he and his opponent Barry Pinches broke the record for the longest official frame of snooker. The frame lasted for 100 minutes and 24 seconds, with Pinches eventually winning the frame, although McManus would go on to win the match. The record stood until April 2017.

McManus qualified for the 2016 World Championship with victories over Michael Wasley, David Morris and Jimmy Robertson. In the first round at the Crucible he defeated his fellow-countryman Stephen Maguire 10–7, before overcoming Ali Carter 13–11 in round two. His quarter-final saw him come from 9–11 down against John Higgins to take the final four frames and win 13–11, setting up his first semi-final appearance at the World Championship since 1993. In that semi-final he lost to Ding 11–17. His end-of-season ranking of 20 was the highest he had been in a decade.

=== 2016/2017 season ===
In the 2016–17 season the furthest McManus could progress in an event was at the World Open, where he beat Jamie Cope and Liang Wenbo, but he was thrashed 0–5 by Thepchaiya Un-Nooh. He would also reach the third round in the 2016 Paul Hunter Classic, defeating Andy Hicks and Christopher Keogan, both 4–1, before coming up short against Tom Ford.

=== 2017/2018 season ===
McManus started the 2017–18 season at number 32 in the world rankings; and would reach the third round of both the 2017 China Championship and 2017 Paul Hunter Classic. He would also reach the second round of the 2017 UK Championship with a 6–3 win over Robin Hull; before losing a final frame decider to Jimmy Robertson 5–6.

== Performance and rankings timeline ==
Tournament	1990/ 91	1991/ 92	1992/ 93	1993/ 94	1994/ 95	1995/ 96	1996/ 97	1997/ 98	1998/ 99	1999/ 00	2000/ 01	2001/ 02	2002/ 03	2003/ 04	2004/ 05	2005/ 06	2006/ 07	2007/ 08	2008/ 09	2009/ 10	2010/ 11	2011/ 12	2012/ 13	2013/ 14	2014/ 15	2015/ 16	2016/ 17	2017/ 18	2018/ 19	2019/ 20	2020/ 21
Ranking (Note: From the 2010/2011 season it shows the ranking at the beginning of the season.)	(Note: New players on the Main Tour don't have a ranking.)	41	13	6	6	6	6	10	8	8	8	12	15	10	10	12	19	38	37	41	46	51	52	49	29	23	20	29	64	51	48
Ranking tournaments
European Masters (Note: The event was called the European Open (1992/1993–1996/1997), Irish Open (1998/1999) and Malta Cup (2004/2005–2007/2008))	LQ	1R	1R	QF	2R	1R	QF	NH	F	Not Held		2R	1R	1R	QF	2R	LQ	NR	Tournament Not Held								LQ	2R	2R	LQ	2R
English Open	Tournament Not Held																										2R	1R	3R	2R	1R
Championship League	Tournament Not Held																	Non-Ranking Event													RR
Northern Ireland Open	Tournament Not Held																										2R	1R	2R	1R	1R
UK Championship	SF	LQ	SF	1R	1R	1R	SF	QF	1R	1R	2R	3R	3R	3R	3R	2R	3R	LQ	LQ	LQ	LQ	LQ	LQ	2R	1R	2R	2R	2R	3R	3R	1R
Scottish Open (Note: The event was called the International Open (1992/1993–1996/1997) and the Players Championship (2003/2004))	Not Held		QF	SF	QF	1R	QF	1R	QF	2R	QF	2R	QF	3R	Tournament Not Held								MR	Not Held			1R	2R	2R	2R	2R
World Grand Prix	Tournament Not Held																								NR	DNQ	DNQ	DNQ	DNQ	DNQ	DNQ
German Masters (Note: The event was called the German Open (1995/1996–1997/1998))	Tournament Not Held					SF	1R	1R	NR	Tournament Not Held											LQ	LQ	LQ	3R	LQ	1R	LQ	1R	LQ	LQ	LQ
Shoot-Out	NR	Tournament Not Held																			Non-Ranking Event						1R	1R	3R	1R	2R
Welsh Open	NH	2R	F	F	2R	2R	1R	QF	3R	1R	QF	1R	2R	QF	2R	2R	2R	2R	LQ	LQ	LQ	LQ	QF	2R	4R	3R	1R	1R	1R	1R	2R
Players Championship (Note: The event was called the Players Tour Championship Grand Finals (2010/2011–2012/2013) and the Players Championship Grand Final (013/2014–2015/2016))	Tournament Not Held																				DNQ	DNQ	DNQ	DNQ	1R	1R	DNQ	DNQ	DNQ	DNQ	DNQ
Gibraltar Open	Tournament Not Held																									MR	A	A	A	A	2R
WST Pro Series	Tournament Not Held																														RR
Tour Championship	Tournament Not Held																												DNQ	DNQ	DNQ
World Championship	2R	SF	SF	2R	2R	2R	2R	2R	2R	2R	1R	1R	2R	2R	QF	1R	LQ	LQ	LQ	LQ	LQ	LQ	1R	QF	1R	SF	LQ	LQ	LQ	1R	LQ
Non-ranking tournaments
World Seniors Championship	NH	A	Tournament Not Held																		A	VF	A	A	LQ	A	A	A	NH	A	A
The Masters	1R	LQ	SF	W	QF	SF	1R	1R	SF	1R	1R	SF	1R	1R	1R	SF	A	A	A	A	A	A	A	A	A	A	A	A	A	A	A
Former ranking tournaments
Classic	3R	QF	Tournament Not Held																												
Strachan Open (Note: The event was called the Strachan Challenge (1992/1993–1993/1994))	NH	1R	MR	NR	Tournament Not Held																										
Dubai Classic (Note: The event was called the Thailand Classic (1995/1996) and the Asian Classic (1996/1997))	1R	LQ	SF	SF	W	2R	SF	Tournament Not Held																							
Malta Grand Prix	Tournament Not Held				Non-Ranking Event					2R	NR	Tournament Not Held																			
Thailand Masters (Note: The event was called the Asian Open (1990/1991–1992/1993) and the Thailand Open (1993/1994–1996/97))	LQ	F	3R	SF	2R	W	1R	QF	F	1R	1R	2R	NR	Not Held			NR	Tournament Not Held													
British Open	1R	1R	2R	QF	2R	3R	QF	2R	2R	QF	SF	QF	QF	2R	2R	Tournament Not Held															
Irish Masters	Non-Ranking Event												1R	1R	2R	NH	NR	Tournament Not Held													
Northern Ireland Trophy	Tournament Not Held															NR	1R	1R	3R	Tournament Not Held											
Bahrain Championship	Tournament Not Held																		LQ	Tournament Not Held											
Wuxi Classic (Note: The event was called the Jiangsu Classic (2008/2009–2009/2010))	Tournament Not Held																		Non-Ranking Event				LQ	2R	3R	Tournament Not Held					
Australian Goldfields Open (Note: The event was called the Australian Open (1994/1995) and the Australian Masters (1995/1996))	Tournament Not Held				Non-Ranking		Tournament Not Held															LQ	1R	LQ	2R	A	Tournament Not Held				
Shanghai Masters	Tournament Not Held																	LQ	LQ	LQ	LQ	LQ	LQ	LQ	QF	1R	LQ	2R	Non-Ranking		NH
Paul Hunter Classic (Note: The event was called the Grand Prix Fürth (2004/2005) and the Fürth German Open (2005/2006–2006/2007))	Tournament Not Held														Pro-am Event						Minor-Ranking Event						3R	3R	A	NR	NH
Indian Open	Tournament Not Held																							1R	1R	NH	A	1R	LQ	Not Held	
China Open (Note: The event was called the China International (1997/1998–1998/1999))	Tournament Not Held							NR	SF	LQ	QF	1R	Not Held		SF	1R	LQ	LQ	LQ	LQ	LQ	LQ	LQ	LQ	1R	1R	1R	LQ	QF	Not Held	
Riga Masters (Note: The event was called the Riga Open (2014/2015–2015/2016))	Tournament Not Held																								MR		LQ	1R	LQ	2R	NH
International Championship	Tournament Not Held																						LQ	2R	1R	LQ	LQ	1R	1R	1R	NH
China Championship	Tournament Not Held																										NR	3R	LQ	LQ	NH
World Open (Note: The event was called the Grand Prix (1990/1991–2000/2001 and 2004/2005–2009/2010), the LG Cup (2001/2002–2003/2004) and the Haikou World Open (2011/2012–2013/2014))	1R	SF	SF	3R	3R	SF	1R	3R	3R	2R	3R	3R	F	2R	2R	1R	SF	LQ	LQ	LQ	2R	LQ	1R	QF	Not Held		3R	LQ	LQ	1R	NH
Former non-ranking tournaments
World Masters	1R	Tournament Not Held																													
Masters Qualifying Event (Note: The event was called the Benson & Hedges Championship (1990/1991–2002/2003))	W	QF	MR	A	A	A	A	A	A	A	A	A	A	A	NH	A	A	A	A	A	Tournament Not Held										
Pot Black	A	A	1R	A	Tournament Not Held											A	A	A	Tournament Not Held												
World Matchplay	A	A	SF	Tournament Not Held																											
Nescafe Extra Challenge	A	NH	RR	Tournament Not Held																											
European Challenge	NH	A	SF	Tournament Not Held																											
Top Rank Classic	Tournament Not Held				F	Tournament Not Held																									
Premier League (Note: The event was called the Matchroom League (1990/1991–1991/1992) and the European League (1992/1993–1996/1997))	A	A	F	SF	RR	A	A	A	A	A	A	A	A	A	A	A	A	A	A	A	A	A	A	Tournament Not Held							
German Masters	Tournament Not Held					Ranking Event			QF	Tournament Not Held											Ranking Event										
Champions Cup (Note: The event was called the Charity Challenge (1994/1995–1998/1999))	Tournament Not Held				SF	1R	SF	A	QF	A	A	A	Tournament Not Held																		
Irish Masters	A	A	F	F	1R	1R	1R	A	1R	QF	QF	A	Ranking Event			NH	A	Tournament Not Held													
Scottish Masters	A	1R	1R	F	1R	1R	F	F	1R	1R	QF	LQ	LQ	Tournament Not Held																	
Northern Ireland Trophy	Tournament Not Held															SF	Ranking Event			Tournament Not Held											
Scottish Professional Championship	Tournament Not Held																				QF	Tournament Not Held									
World Grand Prix	Tournament Not Held																								1R	Ranking Event					
Shoot-Out	SF	Tournament Not Held																			2R	1R	2R	3R	1R	1R	Ranking Event				

Performance Table Legend
LQ	lost in the qualifying draw	#R	lost in the early rounds of the tournament (WR = Wildcard round, RR = Round robin)	QF	lost in the quarter-finals
SF	lost in the semi-finals	F	lost in the final	W	won the tournament
DNQ	did not qualify for the tournament	A	did not participate in the tournament	WD	withdrew from the tournament
DQ	disqualified from the tournament				

NH / Not Held	event was not held.
NR / Non-Ranking Event	event is/was no longer a ranking event.
R / Ranking Event	event is/was a ranking event.
MR / Minor-Ranking Event	means an event is/was a minor-ranking event.
PA / Pro-am Event	means an event is/was a pro-am event.

== Career finals ==
=== Ranking finals: 8 (2 titles) ===
Outcome	No.	Year	Championship	Opponent in the final	Score
Runner-up	1.	1992	Asian Open	(England) Steve Davis	3–9
Runner-up	2.	1993	Welsh Open	(Republic of Ireland) Ken Doherty	7–9
Runner-up	3.	1994	Welsh Open (2)	(England) Steve Davis	6–9
Winner	1.	1994	Dubai Classic	(England) Peter Ebdon	9–6
Winner	2.	1996	Thailand Open	(Republic of Ireland) Ken Doherty	9–8
Runner-up	4.	1998	Irish Open	(Wales) Mark Williams	4–9
Runner-up	5.	1999	Thailand Masters	(Wales) Mark Williams	7–9
Runner-up	6.	2002	LG Cup	(Scotland) Chris Small	5–9

=== Minor-ranking finals: 1 ===
Outcome	No.	Year	Championship	Opponent in the final	Score
Runner-up	1.	1992	Benson & Hedges Championship	(Scotland) Chris Small	1–9

=== Non-ranking finals: 10 (2 titles) ===
Legend
The Masters (1–0)
Premier League (0–1)
Other (1–7)

Outcome	No.	Year	Championship	Opponent in the final	Score
Winner	1.	1990	Benson & Hedges Championship	(Thailand) James Wattana	9–5
Runner-up	1.	1993	European League	(England) Jimmy White	7–10
Runner-up	2.	1993	Irish Masters	(England) Steve Davis	4–9
Runner-up	3.	1993	Scottish Masters	(Republic of Ireland) Ken Doherty	9–10
Winner	2.	1994	The Masters	(Scotland) Stephen Hendry	9–8
Runner-up	4.	1994	Irish Masters (2)	(England) Steve Davis	8–9
Runner-up	5.	1994	Top Rank Classic	(Scotland) Stephen Hendry	Round-Robin
Runner-up	6.	1996	Scottish Masters (2)	(England) Peter Ebdon	6–9
Runner-up	7.	1997	Scottish Masters (3)	(England) Nigel Bond	8–9
Runner-up	8.	2009	Pro Challenge Series – Event 1	(Scotland) Stephen Maguire	2–5

=== Team finals 3 (2 titles) ===
Outcome	No.	Year	Championship	Team	Opponent in the final	Score
Winner	1.	1996	World Cup	Scotland	Ireland	10–7
Runner-up	1.	1999	Nations Cup	Scotland	Wales	4–6
Winner	2.	2001	Nations Cup	Scotland	Ireland	6–2

=== Amateur finals: 2 (1 title) ===
Outcome	No.	Year	Championship	Opponent in the final	Score
Winner	1.	1990	Scottish Amateur Championship	(Scotland) Paul McPhillips	9–5
Runner-up	1.	1990	English Amateur Championship	(Northern Ireland) Joe Swail	11–13
