= Accles & Pollock =

Accles & Pollock is a British tube manipulation company based in Oldbury, West Midlands.

== History ==
The company was started in 1896 by James George Accles as Accles Ltd, based at Holford Mill in Perry Barr in Birmingham as a producer of cold-drawn steel tubing, with the aim of supplying it to the bicycle industry. Accles, employed by Colt 1867–1886, designed the Accles machine gun circa 1888; this was a modified Gatling gun. This company was liquidated in 1898 and Accles' secretary, Charles Barlow, took over, the company becoming the Accles Tube Syndicate, and being renamed Accles and Pollock in 1901, after financial backing was provided by Mr. Tom Pollock.

In 1902 the company moved to nearby Oldbury, and always listed itself as being in 'Oldbury, Birmingham'. Here they produced the first tubular box spanners in 1905, and the first tubular sections for aircraft and the first tubular furniture in 1907. In 1909 two acres of land were acquired in Rounds Green, Oldbury which became Paddock Works. In 1913 they started manufacturing tubular steel shafts for golf clubs, having patented a process for producing seamless tapered tubes, but these were banned by The Royal and Ancient Golf Club of St Andrews, and so these could not be sold in Britain, although their use was permitted in America. The Accles & Pollock tube brand is currently owned by Tyco.

== Bicycles ==
Accles and Pollock was a leading British bicycle tubing manufacturer. Many leading bike builders in the UK during the 1930s, 40s and 50s preferred to use their tubesets as they were air hardening, which become stronger when brazed, unlike the manganese based Reynolds tube which is weakened by heating. Accles and Pollock Kromo tubing was used by Hobbs of Barbican, Rattrays of Glasgow "The Flying Scot" and Thanet in their "Silverlight" model.

== Aircraft ==
The one-off Seddon Mayfly aircraft was built by Accles and Pollock, and used their tubes for much of its airframe.

== Chronology ==
The chronology of Accles & Pollock is as follows:

- 1901: With financial backing from Thomas Pollock, the general engineering company of James George Accles was renamed Accles & Pollock
- 1901: Pollock Engineering Company became the makers of the Accles-Turrell car.
- 1910: Accles & Pollock built a one-off all-metal aircraft, said to be the world's first, the Mayfly, in their Oldbury factory, using a steel tubing structure
- 1913: Accles & Pollock granted a patent for seamless tapered steel golf club shafts.
- 1919: The company was acquired by Tube Investments (TI)
- 1987: Golf club shaft manufacturing becomes a separate subsidiary, TI Apollo.
- 1996: Company sold to the Hay Hall Group
- 1998: Sold to the Senior Engineering Group
- 1999: Acquired by Tyco International
- 2001: Ceased tube manufacturing
- 2004: Acquired by Caparo
- 2015: Purchased by Liberty House Group as part of Caparo Tubular Solutions

== Accles & Pollock archives collection ==
The archives for Accles & Pollock are held at Sandwell Community History and Archives Service

== See also ==
- Accles-Turrell automobile
- Accles & Shelvoke manufacturing company still in existence

== References and sources ==
Sources

- Winchester, Jim. The World's Worst Aircraft. New York City, New York: Metro Books, 2005. ISBN 0-7607-6742-4
