= The Oval (Wirral) =

Athletics stadium in Bebington, Merseyside, England

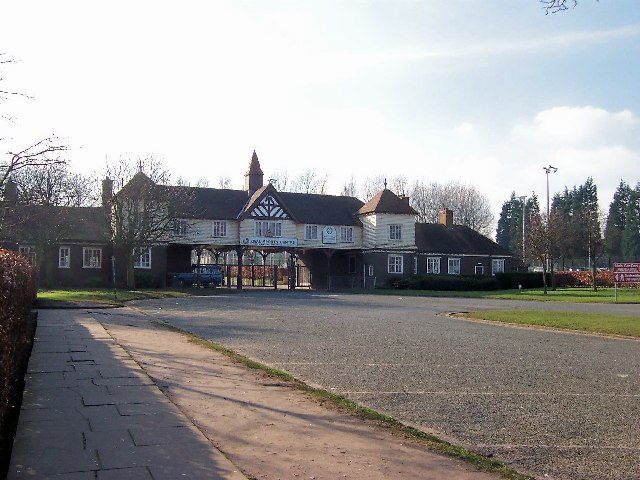
- Interactive map of The Oval
- Coordinates: 53.357902°N 3.009944°W
- Owner: Wirral MBC
- Operator: Wirral MBC

Construction
- Opened: 1888

The Oval (sometimes referred to as the Bebington Oval and Port Sunlight) is a Municipal athletics stadium in Bebington, Merseyside and leisure centre with outdoor ski slope.

The venue has played host to Tranmere Rovers F.C. reserve and ladies teams. The track is regularly used by Wirral AC and Warriors Pentathlon & AC and many competitions such as the Merseyside Championships take place here.

The ground has an eight-lane running track which was originally paid for by Lever Brothers in the 1920s but has since undergone an upgrade. It is the home to a number athletics clubs.

It was featured in the film Chariots of Fire and represented the Stade Olympique Yves-du-Manoir.

Some schools across the area, such as St John Plessington, use the facilities for their PE lessons
