= Les Dodd =

English snooker player

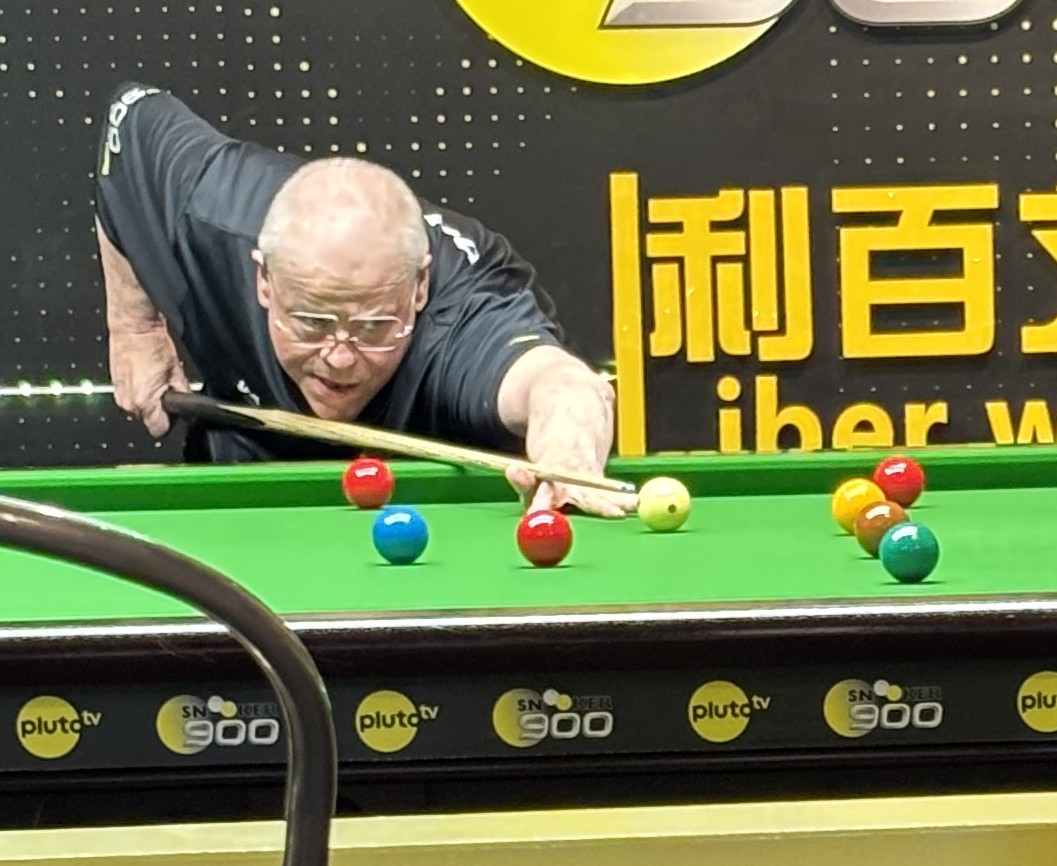
- Dodd in 2026

Personal information
- Born: 11 February 1954 (age 72) Southport

Sport
- Country: England
- Sport: Snooker
- Professional: 1982–1997, 1998/1999
- Highest ranking: 36 (1983–1984)
- Best ranking finish: Quarter-final (x2)

Les Dodd (born 11 February 1954) is an English former professional snooker player. He was runner-up in the 1987 English Professional Championship.

== Career ==
Dodd was born on 11 February 1954 in Southport, and turned professional in 1982. In his first professional season, he reached the televised stages of the 1983 World Snooker Championship, where he lost 7–10 to Eddie Charlton.

Dodd's only professional final was the 1987 English Professional Championship; there, he was defeated 9–5 by Tony Meo, having earlier eliminated Tony Knowles, Barry West, Mike Hallett and reigning World Champion Joe Johnson.

He reached the quarter-finals of two ranking events in 1990: the British Open, where he lost 2–5 to Steve James, and the Asian Open, where Mike Hallett beat him 5–4.

Dodd was ranked 121st in the world at the end of the 1996–97 season, and dropped off the professional tour. He regained his status for the 1998–99 season, but lost it again immediately thereafter. The highest world ranking that he attained in his career was 36th, in the 1983–84 snooker world rankings.

In the 2012 World Seniors Championship, Dodd defeated Andrew Milliard 2–0, Bill Oliver 2–0 and Steve Meakin 2–1 to qualify for the last 16, but fell at this stage 0–2 to Alain Robidoux. He failed to qualify in 2013, losing in the last round to Philip Williams, and entered again in 2015 and 2016, again losing in the last round of qualifying on both occasions; John Welsh defeated him 2–0 in 2015, and he lost by the same scoreline to Robert Milkins in the 2016 edition.
