= Baths Hall =

Building in Scunthorpe, England

The Baths Hall
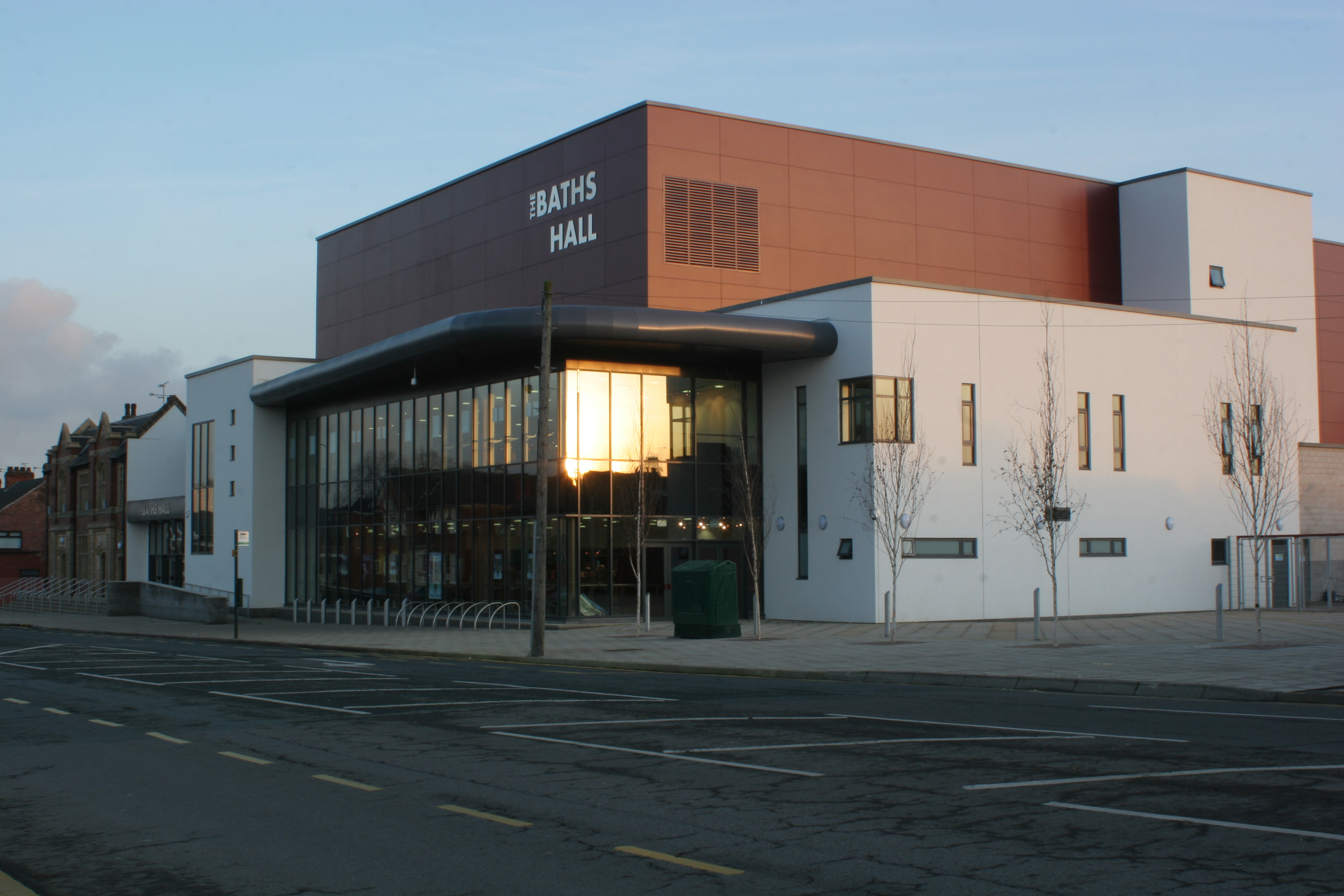
- Front view of The Baths Hall
- Interactive map of The Baths Hall
- Location: Scunthorpe, England
- Coordinates: 53.5905°N 0.6590°W
- Owner: North Lincolnshire Council
- Operator: SMG Europe (November 2011 – October 2019) ASM Global (October 2019 – March 2022) North Lincolnshire Council (March 2022 – present)
- Capacity: 1,000 (all seated), 1,800 (with floor standing)
- Events: Rock, comedy, Dance, Theatre Shows, Conferences, Weddings

Construction
- Built: 2009–2011 (New Building)
- Opened: 1970s (as "Baths Hall") November 2011 (as "The Baths Hall")
- Demolished: Late 2000s (Old Building)

Website
- Scunthorpe Theatres

The Baths Hall is an entertainment venue in Scunthorpe, North Lincolnshire, England. It hosts many types of entertainment, including live music, dance and comedy.

== History ==
Situated at 59 Doncaster Road, the Scunthorpe building is a former public bath house dating from 1931. It has served as an entertainment venue since the 1970s. It was renovated and reopened in 2005 but closed to undergo a major re-build.

Bands that have played the venue include The Kinks, Status Quo, Ocean Colour Scene, The Damned, The Bluetones and The Levellers. The late DJ John Peel regularly appeared at the hall.

The previous Conservative Council closed the Baths, intending to demolish it and replace it with private housing. In 2007 the Conservative Council was replaced by a Labour Council, which honoured its manifesto commitment to save the Baths. It rebuilt the hall, retaining its 1931 frontage, and created a modern entertainment venue. The Hall is able to seat a maximum of 1,000 people, rising to 1,800 when floor standing is adopted.

The building's design, by North Lincolnshire Council's architects, incorporates environmentally friendly technology, including a rainwater harvesting system for use in the lavatories.

When the building reopened, it was initially operated by SMG Europe, which merged with AEG Facilities to form ASM Global in October 2019. In March 2022, North Lincolnshire Council took over the operations of the venue. On 19 March 2021, The Baths Hall opened as a vaccination centre for the COVID-19 vaccination programme until it returned to an entertainment venue in August 2021.

== Images ==
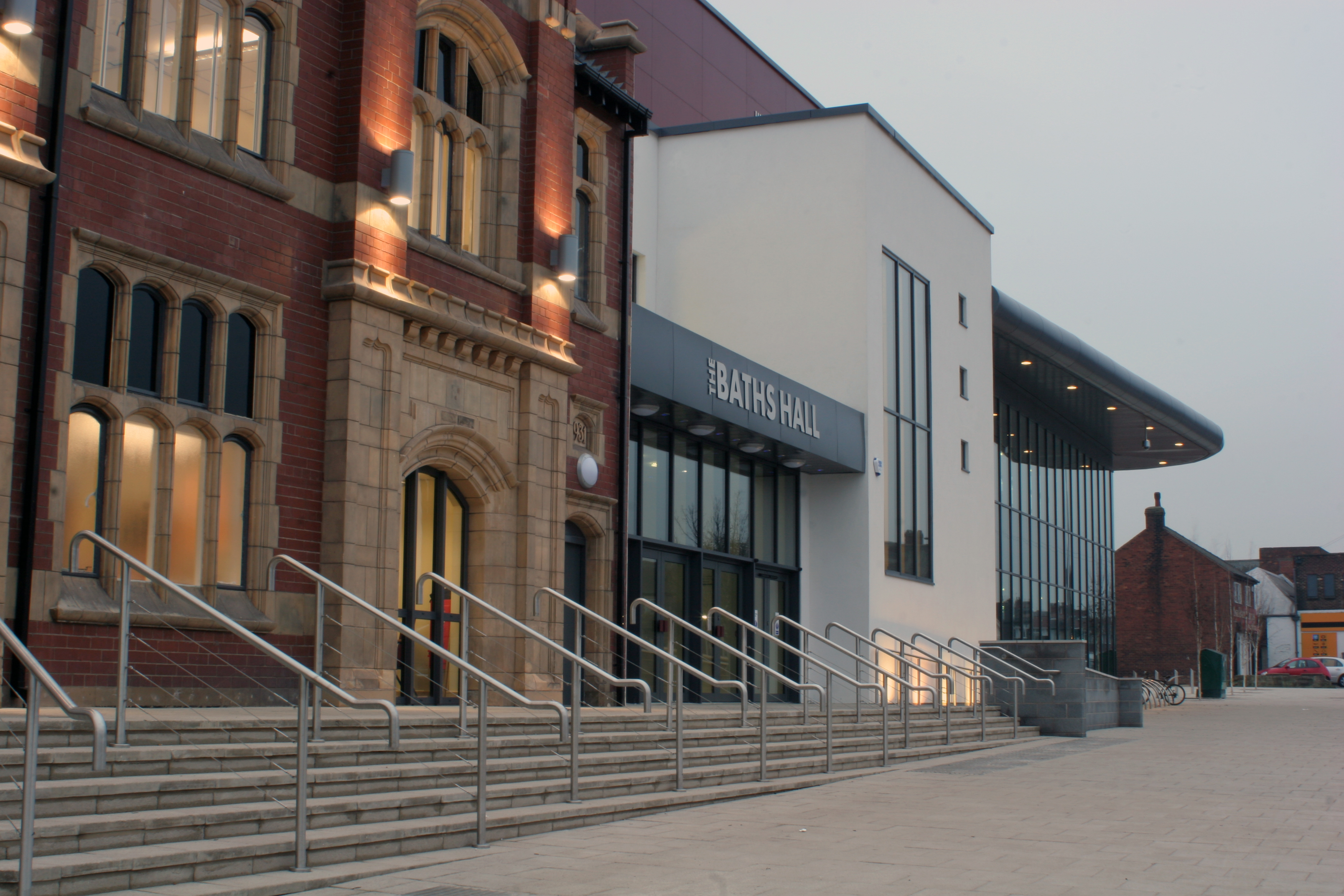
Front entrance

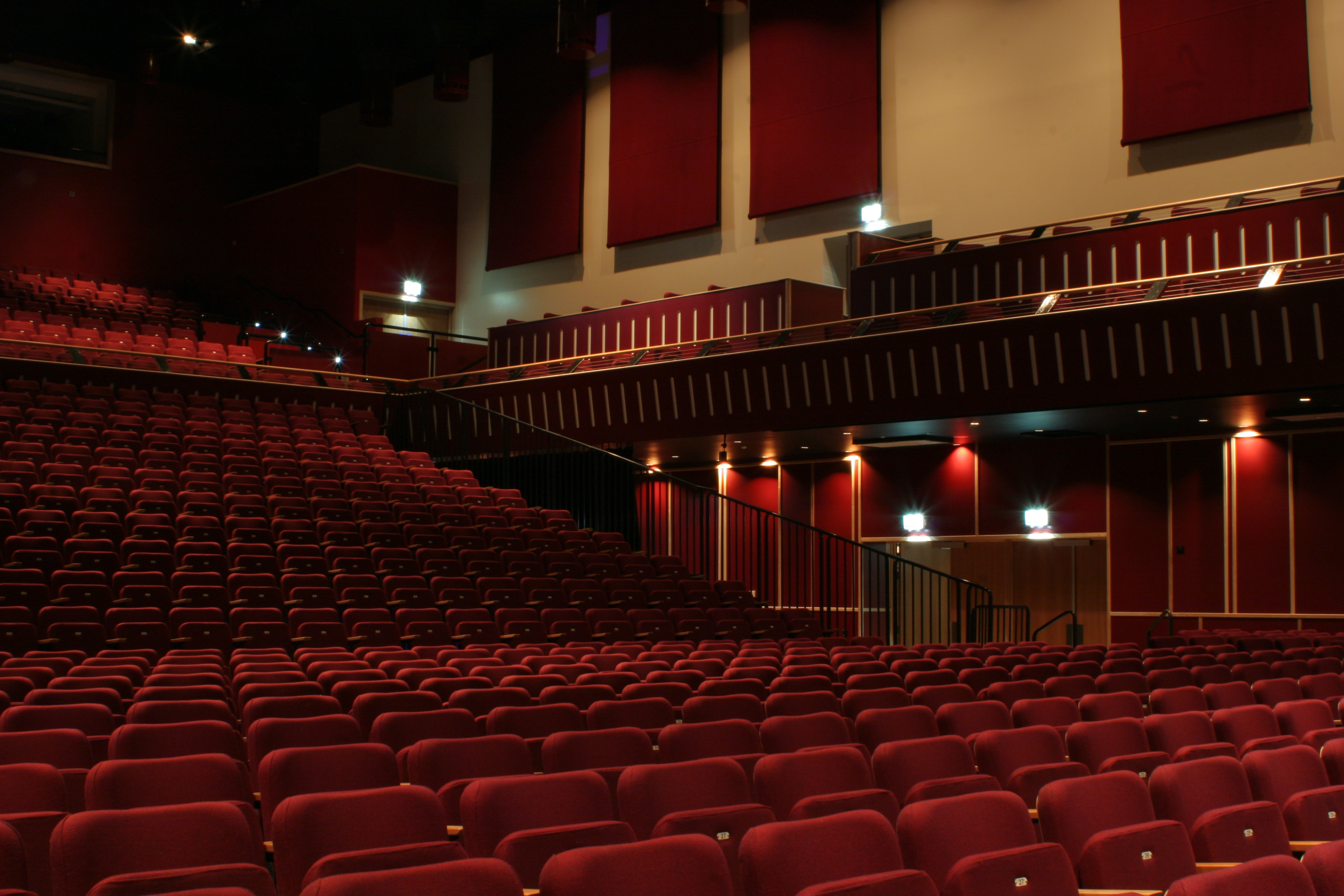
Auditorium

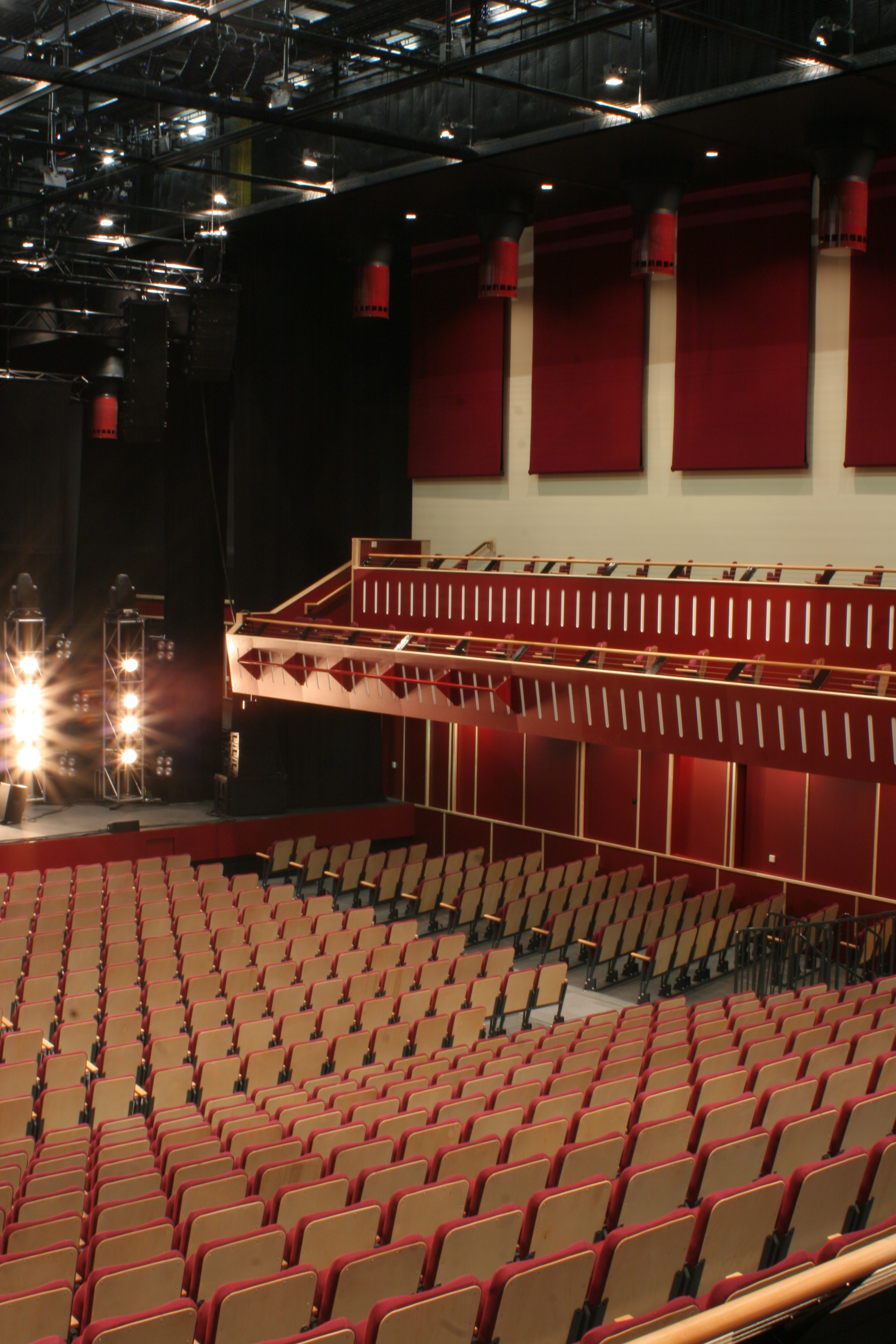
Auditorium
