= Paul McPhillips =

Scottish snooker player

Personal information
- Born: 27 March 1971 (age 55) Glasgow, Scotland

Sport
- Country: Scotland
- Sport: Snooker
- Professional: 1991–1997, 1998–2001
- Highest ranking: 59 (1994/1995)
- Best ranking finish: Last 16 (x2)

Paul McPhillips (born 27 March 1971) is a Scottish former professional snooker player. He is best known as the regular practice partner of Stephen Hendry.

== Amateur career ==
McPhillips was the UK Junior Champion in 1987. In 1990, he was defeated by Alan McManus in the final of the Scottish Amateur Championship.

== Pro career ==
McPhillips turned Pro in 1991. In the 1992 Classic he reached the last 32 by defeating former world champion Joe Johnson. He defeated Ronnie O'Sullivan to reach the Last 16 of the 1994 Welsh Open but was beaten by Steve Davis and he also finished runners up to Matthew Stevens at the 1995 Benson & Hedges Championship in Edinburgh, he reached no. 59 in the Snooker world rankings 1994/1995 as a result. At the 1997 British Open, he reached the last 16 but was narrowly defeated by Stephen Hendry. During the 1997/98 season, he defeated Michael Holt 6–5 to win the 1st event, in Event 4 he reached the last 16 and at Event 5 he reached the Quarter Final to claim the overall UK Tour.

He had another notable victory in 3rd Qualifying round of the 2001 Embassy World Snooker Championship against Tony Jones.

In the later stages of his career he reached the preliminary round at the 2011 Scottish Professional Championship. and at the 2015 World Seniors Championship he was defeated in the quarter finals by John Parrott.

== Career finals ==
=== Non-ranking finals: 2 (1 title) ===
Outcome	No.	Year	Championship	Opponent in the final	Score
Runner-up	1.	1995	Benson & Hedges Championship	(Wales) Matthew Stevens	3–9
Winner	1.	1997	UK Tour – Event 1	(England) Michael Holt	6–5

=== Amateur finals: 1 ===
Outcome	No.	Year	Championship	Opponent in the final	Score
Runner-up	1.	1990	Scottish Amateur Championship	(Scotland) Alan McManus	5–9
