= Mountbatten Centre =

Leisure centre in Portsmouth

Coordinates: 50.824°N 1.083°W

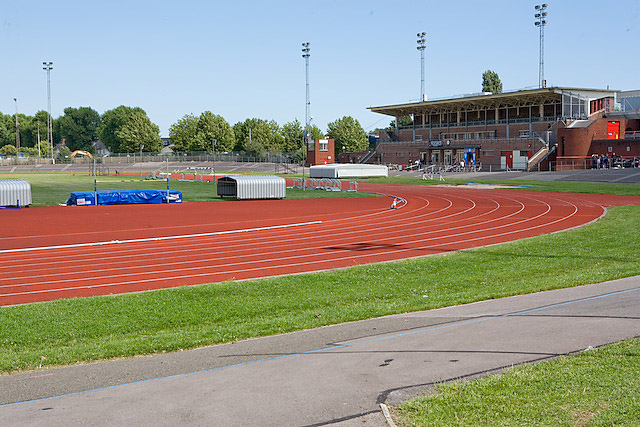
Mountbatten Centre athletics track

The Mountbatten Centre is a leisure centre in Portsmouth, England, which opened in 1979, and was extended with a pool under a waveform roof in 2009. The "Mountbatten Centre" is located in Hilsea, an area in Portsmouth. The original design was by Ken Norrish the then city architect. The extension was designed by Saunders Architects.

== Facilities ==
- 8 lane 50 m pool
- 12.5 m teaching pool
- 150 station fitness gym
- 5-a-side pitches
- Climbing Wall
- Eight badminton courts
- Basketball courts
- Two netball courts
- Athletics track
- Outdoor cycle velodrome
- All weather pitch
- Café bar
- Squash courts
- Dance studio
- Martial arts room

== Notable sporting events ==
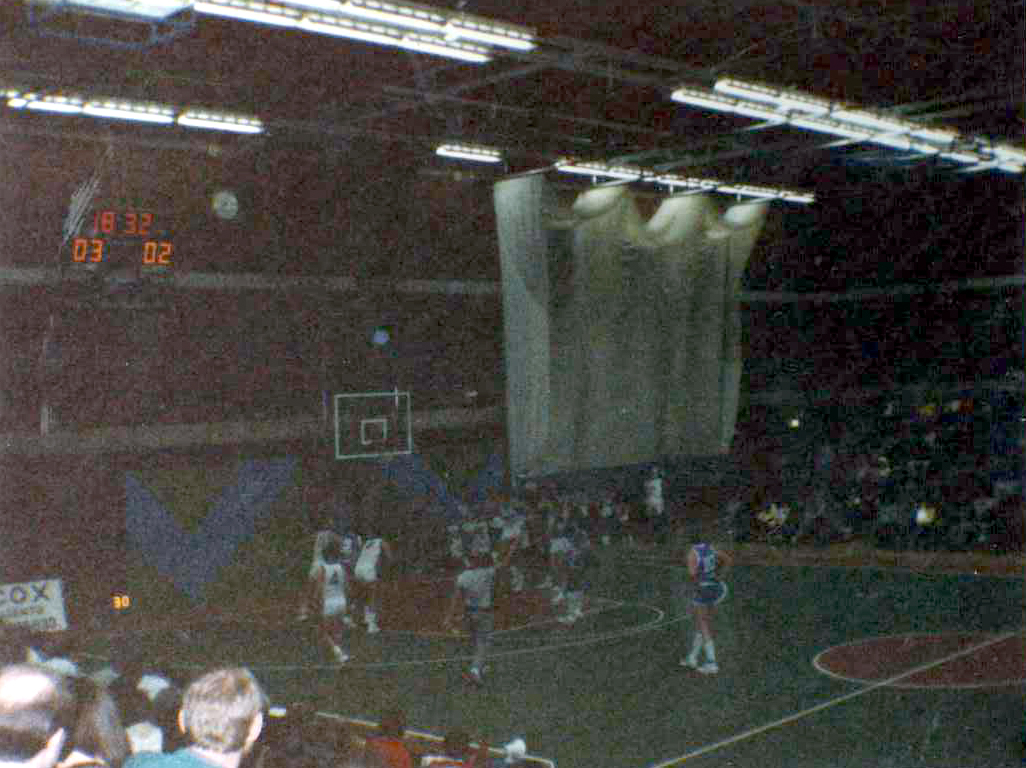
A basketball match, Portsmouth versus Crystal Palace, 26 March 1986

The Mountbatten Centre has become a known venue in the UK, this is due to popular sporting events taking place there.

- Sky Sports Boxing
- Robot Wars
- Snooker World Seniors Championship 2012 - 2013
- World Cup of Pool 2014
- British Cycling
- SER ASA Swimming Championships
- Hampshire Open Fencing Tournament

== Sports teams ==
- Portsmouth City Smugglers - Basketball
- Portsmouth Dreadnoughts British American football Team. The Dreadnoughts are named after the famous battleship HMS Dreadnought. The team trains and plays home games on the playing fields in Alexandra Park adjacent to the stadium.
- Portsmouth Northsea Swimming Club - Home since the pool at Mountbatten Centre opened in 2009, Portsmouth Northsea has been going since 1929 and has international reputation through the likes of Olympic swimmers Katy Sexton, Gemma Spofforth and Paralympic athlete Lauren Steadman.

== See also ==
- List of cycling tracks and velodromes
