= 2012–13 snooker world rankings =

Preceded by 2011–12	2012–13	Succeeded by 2013–14

2012–13 snooker world rankings: The professional world rankings for all the professional snooker players who qualified for the 2012‍–‍13 season are listed below. The rankings worked as a two-year rolling list. The points for each tournament two years ago were removed, when the corresponding tournament during the current season has finished. The following table contains the rankings, which were used to determine the seedings for certain tournaments.

Name	Country	Revision 1^{[a]}^{[b]}		Revision 2^{[c]}		Revision 3^{[d]}		^{[e]}Revision 4		Revision 5^{[f]}	
Mark Selby	England	1	74925	1	77485	2	76620	1	81380	1	80940
Neil Robertson	Australia	7	59540	6	62980	5	65180	5	65540	2	79460
Judd Trump	England	2	68975	2	72075	1	79155	2	79275	3	78320
Shaun Murphy	England	6	59685	5	63925	4	67140	4	68220	4	67020
Stephen Maguire	Scotland	4	61400	4	63980	7	63080	6	60320	5	66940
Mark Allen	Northern Ireland	12	50065	13	53485	8	59800	8	56360	6	66060
John Higgins	Scotland	5	61320	7	61680	3	72040	3	70680	7	64955
Stuart Bingham	England	16	46600	12	53700	10	54575	10	55255	8	61740
Ding Junhui	China	11	52340	9	56220	11	54280	11	53840	9	59300
Mark Williams	Wales	3	63560	3	67740	6	64400	7	60320	10	58260
Graeme Dott	Scotland	13	49445	14	52225	13	52740	14	52500	11	56100
Matthew Stevens	Wales	10	52760	11	53900	14	50140	13	52660	12	55060
Ricky Walden	England	15	46945	10	54245	12	54125	12	53165	13	54765
Barry Hawkins	England	22	39940	19	47700	16	46915	17	47915	14	54680
Ali Carter	England	17	46220	17	48900	15	47000	15	51760	15	52895
Mark Davis	England	19	41490	18	48210	17	46670	16	50190	16	51630
Marco Fu	Hong Kong	28	36825	28	39390	24	42490	24	41930	17	47390
Stephen Lee	England	8	56550	8	60670	9	59670	9	55430	18	47135
Robert Milkins	England	36	31245	30	37200	28	39890	25	41530	19	47080
Joe Perry	England	24	38670	23	43510	18	46640	18	46800	20	46230
Martin Gould	England	14	47290	16	51650	19	45030	19	44830	21	44515
Andrew Higginson	England	18	43170	21	45570	26	40335	29	38495	22	44055
Dominic Dale	Wales	23	39855	24	43075	25	42475	21	43595	23	43915
Tom Ford	England	26	37080	26	40500	27	40100	27	41460	24	43465
Michael Holt	England	33	32480	32	36400	30	38515	28	41155	25	42655
Ken Doherty	Ireland	35	32145	31	36565	29	38655	31	37215	26	42130
Marcus Campbell	Scotland	25	38395	22	44035	23	42545	26	41505	27	42045
Ronnie O'Sullivan	England	9	53060	15	52060	20	44860	20	43740	28	41360
Ryan Day	Wales	30	34930	29	39195	22	43670	23	43470	29	41225
Mark King	England	31	33550	35	34730	32	35885	30	37605	30	40665
Peter Ebdon	England	20	40645	20	46605	21	44505	22	43505	31	38735
Jamie Cope	England	27	37080	25	40720	31	36280	32	36640	32	36795
Fergal O'Brien	Ireland	34	32275	33	35510	34	34780	33	35540	33	36740
Liang Wenbo	China	37	29990	39	33140	38	32465	38	32585	34	36450
Ben Woollaston	England	43	27775	43	30655	40	32075	35	33315	35	36090
Jamie Burnett	Scotland	39	29110	36	34630	35	34770	34	33490	36	35905
Jack Lisowski	England	40	28870	38	33480	43	30170	42	31930	37	34625
Xiao Guodong	China	41	28455	42	31205	42	30745	43	31505	38	34585
Rory McLeod	England	38	29965	40	32775	41	31845	39	32445	39	33800
Jamie Jones	Wales	29	34945	34	35205	36	33625	41	32305	40	33410
Michael White	Wales	54	24495	44	30005	39	32440	37	32800	41	33295
Anthony Hamilton	England	32	32970	37	34495	37	32500	36	32980	42	32840
Dave Harold	England	48	25955	47	28705	46	28075	45	29195	43	31185
Nigel Bond	England	45	26875	46	28905	45	28485	46	28125	44	30695
Matthew Selt	England	44	27770	41	31880	44	29845	44	29325	45	30465
Mark Joyce	England	59	22810	59	24595	51	25640	54	25120	46	30220
David Gilbert	England	57	23420	56	25664	49	26330	48	26856	47	30194
Steve Davis	England	51	25225	51	26865	50	26140	47	27660	48	29670
Anthony McGill	Scotland	50	25420	52	26360	55	24650	53	25410	49	29330
Alan McManus	Scotland	52	24695	48	27605	54	24970	55	24970	50	29005
Jimmy Robertson	England	55	24275	54	26055	52	25530	50	26450	51	28895
Liu Chuang	China	56	24110	50	26880	47	27320	52	25560	52	28795
Yu Delu	China	58	23015	60	24399	56	24430	49	26636	53	27944
Alfie Burden	England	60	22760	58	24665	57	23985	56	24545	54	26090
Stephen Hendry	Scotland	21	40035	27	40035	33	35475	40	32435	55	25975
Gerard Greene	Northern Ireland	42	28210	45	29330	48	27190	51	26030	56	23645
Jimmy White	England	46	26455	49	27445	53	25440	57	23920	57	23575
Peter Lines	England	53	24510	53	26170	58	23895	58	22575	58	22870
Mike Dunn	England	49	25450	55	25810	59	21760	60	20800	59	21240
James Wattana	Thailand	63	20610	61	23335	60	21440	59	20840	60	21215
Adam Duffy	England	62	20865	64	20769	63	19520	62	19646	61	21024
Barry Pinches	England	64	20495	63	21015	62	20415	61	20575	62	20415
Rod Lawler	England			65	4680	65	9890	66	12450	63	19235
Andy Hicks	England	61	21815	62	22435	64	18715	63	19075	64	18265
Cao Yupeng	China			66	3460	66	9400	65	13000	65	16655
Kurt Maflin	Norway			67	2870	68	7180	70	8820	66	16390
Ian Burns	England			82	1850	75	5230	74	7830	67	14660
Tian Pengfei	China			71	2560	70	6430	69	8950	68	14360
Thepchaiya Un-Nooh	Thailand			85	1810	73	6030	68	8990	69	13915
Dechawat Poomjaeng	Thailand			78	2115	77	4890	76	7050	70	13190
Luca Brecel	Belgium			75	2220	74	6010	67	10370	71	13100
Pankaj Advani	India			73	2300	69	6460	73	7900	72	12830
Thanawat Thirapongpaiboon	Thailand			69	2780	76	5070	75	7270	73	12340
Aditya Mehta	India			74	2260	67	7630	71	8710	74	12060
Paul Davison	England			79	2030	71	6350	72	8310	75	11810
Chen Zhe	China			72	2390	82	4310	78	6670	76	11490
Robbie Williams	England			83	1850	72	6040	77	6720	77	11060
Liam Highfield	England			87	1790	78	4810	80	6210	78	10750
Michael Wasley	England			76	2170	84	3770	84	5570	79	10120
Zhang Anda	China			89	1480	83	3880	81	5920	80	10110
Craig Steadman	England			86	1795	85	3475	82	5835	81	8805
Tony Drago	Malta			70	2720	81	4310	83	5750	82	8550
Sam Baird	England			81	1900	87	3220	89	3540	83	8140
Li Yan	China			68	2865	79	4760	79	6600	84	8060
Simon Bedford	England			77	2145	86	3425	87	4105	85	7945
Martin O'Donnell	England			84	1810	89	3130	90	3450	86	7940
Daniel Wells	Wales			96	480	92	2520	86	4280	87	7770
David Grace	England			88	1725	80	4735	85	5415	88	7505
Scott Donaldson	Scotland			92	720	88	3220	88	3900	89	6710
Joel Walker	England			90	1470	90	2790	92	3110	90	5490
Sean O'Sullivan	England			95	480	95	1440	95	1760	91	5190
Passakorn Suwannawat	Thailand			80	1935	91	2710	93	3030	92	5190
Jamie O'Neill	England			94	480	94	1440	94	2480	93	3660
Ben Judge	Australia			91	840	93	2430	91	3110	94	3560
Michael Leslie	Scotland			93	480	96	1080	96	1400	95	3490
Mohamed Khairy	Egypt			122	0	123	0	123	0	96	1010
Hossein Vafaei	Iran			156	0	97	360	97	360	97	360
Floyd Ziegler	Canada			165	0	165	0	165	0	166	0
Joe Jogia^{[g]}	England	47	26405	57	25045	61	20735	64	18935		

== Notes ==
- ^{a} No player is listed outside the top 64 in revision 1, as these players began the season without ranking points.
- ^{b} Revision 1 was used for the seeding of the Wuxi Classic, Australian Goldfields Open, Six-red World Championship and Shanghai Masters.
- ^{c} Revision 2 was used for the seeding of the International Championship.
- ^{d} Revision 3 was used for the seeding of the UK Championship, Masters, German Masters and Snooker Shoot-Out.
- ^{e} Revision 4 was used for the seeding of the Welsh Open, World Open and China Open.
- ^{f} Revision 5 was used for the seeding of the World Championship.
- ^{g} Joe Jogia was banned from all WPBSA events for the entire 2012–13 season, and he was removed from the official rankings following the 2013 Munich Open, after his WPBSA membership was terminated.
