= Gdynia Open =

Tournament information
- Venue: Gdynia Sports Arena
- Location: Gdynia
- Country: Poland
- Established: 2012
- Organisation(s): World Professional Billiards and Snooker Association
- Format: Minor-ranking event
- Total prize fund: €25,000
- Final year: 2016
- Final champion: (England) Mark Selby

The Gdynia Open was a pro–am minor-ranking snooker tournament, which was part of the Players Tour Championship. The tournament in the 2012/2013 was split in two parts, with the first part taking place at the World Snooker Academy in Sheffield, England and the second part at the Gdynia Sports Arena in Gdynia, Poland. In the 2013/2014 season the event was moved to the second half of the season, and the whole event took part in Gdynia. Mark Selby was the last champion, while Neil Robertson is the most successful player in the tournament's history having won the championship two times.

== Winners ==
Year	Winner	Runner-up	Final score	Season
2012	(Australia) Neil Robertson	(Scotland) Jamie Burnett	4–3	2012/13
2014	(England) Shaun Murphy	(Republic of Ireland) Fergal O'Brien	4–1	2013/14
2015	(Australia) Neil Robertson	(Wales) Mark Williams	4–0	2014/15
2016	(England) Mark Selby	(England) Martin Gould	4–1	2015/16

== See also ==
- 2011 Warsaw Classic
