= European Tour 2012/2013 – Event 2 =

Betfair European Tour 2012/2013 Event 2

Tournament information
- Dates: 16–18 August 2012; 5–7 October 2012
- Venue: World Snooker Academy; Gdynia Sports Arena
- City: Sheffield; Gdynia
- Country: England; Poland
- Organisation: World Snooker
- Format: Minor-ranking event
- Total prize fund: €70,000
- Winner's share: €12,000
- Highest break: Stephen Maguire (SCO) (141)

Final
- Champion: Neil Robertson (AUS)
- Runner-up: Jamie Burnett (SCO)
- Score: 4–3

The Betfair European Tour 2012/2013 – Event 2 (also known as the 2012 Gdynia Open) was a professional minor-ranking snooker tournament that took place over 16–18 August 2012 at the World Snooker Academy in Sheffield, England with the first three rounds and 5–7 October 2012 at the Gdynia Sports Arena in Gdynia, Poland from the last 32 onwards.

Neil Robertson won his 12th professional title by defeating Jamie Burnett 4–3 in the final.

== Prize fund and ranking points ==
The breakdown of prize money and ranking points of the event is shown below:

	Prize fund	Ranking points^{1}
Winner	€12,000	2,000
Runner-up	€6,000	1,600
Semi-finalist	€3,000	1,280
Quarter-finalist	€2,000	1,000
Last 16	€1,250	760
Last 32	€750	560
Last 64	€500	360
Total	€70,000	–

- ^{1} Only professional players can earn ranking points.

== Main draw ==
=== Preliminary round ===
Best of 7 frames

(England) Phil O'Kane	4–2	(England) Andrew Milliard
(England) Tom Maxfield	2–4	(England) Adam Wicheard
(England) Ashley Carty	4–0	(England) Dean Goddard
(India) Lucky Vatnani	1–4	(England) Oliver Lines
(England) Matthew Day	4–3	(England) Steven Hallworth
(England) William Lemons	1–4	(England) John Astley
(Wales) Alex Taubman	4–2	(England) Elliot Slessor
(England) Ricky Norris	1–4	(England) John Parkin

(Brazil) Itaro Santos	4–1	(France) Stéphane Ochoïski
(England) Mitchell Mann	4–2	(England) Nico Elton
(Belgium) Hans Blanckaert	2–4	(England) James Cahill
(Belgium) Wan Chooi Tang	0–4	(England) Chris Norbury
(England) Sam Harvey	4–0	(Wales) Jack Bradford
(England) Jamie Gibson	0–4	(England) Kyren Wilson
(Northern Ireland) Joe Swail	4–0	(Scotland) Ross Higgins

=== Main rounds ===
==== Top half ====
===== Section 1 =====
Last 128; Best of 7 frames
(Scotland) Stephen Maguire	4
(England) Simon Bedford	0
(England) Peter Lines	4
(England) Phil O'Kane	0
(England) Jimmy Robertson	4
(England) Adam Wicheard	1
(England) Joel Walker	2
(England) Michael Wasley	4
(China) Xiao Guodong	4
(England) Mark King	3
(England) Joe Perry	4
(England) Ashley Carty	2
(England) Robbie Williams	4
(England) Ben Harrison	2
(England) Jamie Cope	3
(England) Mark Davis	4

Last 64; Best of 7 frames
(Scotland) Stephen Maguire	4
(England) Peter Lines	0
(England) Jimmy Robertson	3
(England) Michael Wasley	4
(China) Xiao Guodong	0
(England) Joe Perry	4
(England) Robbie Williams	1
(England) Mark Davis	4

Last 32; Best of 7 frames
(Scotland) Stephen Maguire	4
(England) Michael Wasley	1
(England) Joe Perry	4
(England) Mark Davis	1

Last 16; Best of 7 frames
(Scotland) Stephen Maguire	4
(England) Joe Perry	1

===== Section 2 =====
Last 128; Best of 7 frames
(England) Andy Hicks	4
(England) Oliver Lines	3
(England) Matthew Couch	0
(England) David Gilbert	4
(China) Liang Wenbo	4
(England) Liam Monk	2
(England) Anthony Hamilton	2
(Northern Ireland) Mark Allen	4
(China) Liu Chuang	0
(China) Zhang Anda	4
(England) Dave Harold	4
(England) Reanne Evans	1
(England) Jimmy White	w/o
(Egypt) Mohamed Khairy	w/d
(England) Andrew Norman	4
(England) Jamie O'Neill	3

Last 64; Best of 7 frames
(England) Andy Hicks	4
(England) David Gilbert	3
(China) Liang Wenbo	4
(Northern Ireland) Mark Allen	1
(China) Zhang Anda	2
(England) Dave Harold	4
(England) Jimmy White	4
(England) Andrew Norman	3

Last 32; Best of 7 frames
(England) Andy Hicks	0
(China) Liang Wenbo	4
(England) Dave Harold	1
(England) Jimmy White	4

Last 16; Best of 7 frames
(China) Liang Wenbo	3
(England) Jimmy White	4

===== Section 3 =====
Last 128; Best of 7 frames
(Scotland) Anthony McGill	4
(England) Adrian Gunnell	1
(Wales) Jak Jones	1
(England) Matthew Day	4
(England) Ian Burns	2
(China) Tian Pengfei	4
(India) Pankaj Advani	4
(Wales) Daniel Wells	3
(England) Allan Taylor	w/o
(Iran) Hossein Vafaei	w/d
(China) Cao Yupeng	4
(China) Chen Zhe	2
(China) Li Yan	3
(Malta) Tony Drago	4
(England) Stuart Bingham	4
(Scotland) Marc Davis	0

Last 64; Best of 7 frames
(Scotland) Anthony McGill	4
(England) Matthew Day	2
(China) Tian Pengfei	4
(India) Pankaj Advani	2
(England) Allan Taylor	3
(China) Cao Yupeng	4
(Malta) Tony Drago	2
(England) Stuart Bingham	4

Last 32; Best of 7 frames
(Scotland) Anthony McGill	2
(China) Tian Pengfei	4
(China) Cao Yupeng	w/d
(England) Stuart Bingham	w/o

Last 16; Best of 7 frames
(China) Tian Pengfei	4
(England) Stuart Bingham	3

===== Section 4 =====
Last 128; Best of 7 frames
(England) Ben Woollaston	4
(Poland) Grzegorz Biernadski	0
(England) Paul Davison	4
(England) John Astley	3
(England) Ricky Walden	2
(England) Martin Gould	4
(Thailand) Thanawat Thirapongpaiboon	0
(England) Barry Pinches	4
(China) Yu Delu	4
(India) Aditya Mehta	1
(Australia) Neil Robertson	4
(Wales) Alex Taubman	0
(England) Barry Hawkins	1
(Wales) Jamie Jones	4
(England) Steve Davis	4
(Poland) Wiktor Rzezuchowski	0

Last 64; Best of 7 frames
(England) Ben Woollaston	4
(England) Paul Davison	3
(England) Martin Gould	4
(England) Barry Pinches	0
(China) Yu Delu	3
(Australia) Neil Robertson	4
(Wales) Jamie Jones	4
(England) Steve Davis	1

Last 32; Best of 7 frames
(England) Ben Woollaston	1
(England) Martin Gould	4
(Australia) Neil Robertson	4
(Wales) Jamie Jones	3

Last 16; Best of 7 frames
(England) Martin Gould	3
(Australia) Neil Robertson	4

==== Bottom half ====
===== Section 5 =====
Last 128; Best of 7 frames
(England) Andrew Higginson	4
(Hong Kong) Marco Fu	2
(Wales) Gareth Allen	4
(England) Nigel Bond	1
(England) Stephen Lee	4
(England) John Parkin	0
(England) Rod Lawler	4
(Brazil) Itaro Santos	1
(England) Michael Holt	4
(England) Oliver Brown	0
(England) Ryan Causton	4
(England) Mike Dunn	3
(England) David Grace	4
(England) Liam Highfield	0
(Wales) Michael White	4
(England) Michael Wild	0

Last 64; Best of 7 frames
(England) Andrew Higginson	4
(Wales) Gareth Allen	0
(England) Stephen Lee	4
(England) Rod Lawler	1
(England) Michael Holt	4
(England) Ryan Causton	3
(England) David Grace	1
(Wales) Michael White	4

Last 32; Best of 7 frames
(England) Andrew Higginson	3
(England) Stephen Lee	4
(England) Michael Holt	4
(Wales) Michael White	2

Last 16; Best of 7 frames
(England) Stephen Lee	3
(England) Michael Holt	4

===== Section 6 =====
Last 128; Best of 7 frames
(China) Ding Junhui	4
(England) Greg Davis	0
(Wales) Dominic Dale	4
(England) Thomas Wealthy	0
(Scotland) John Higgins	4
(England) Christopher Keogan	1
(England) Gary Wilson	1
(Northern Ireland) Gerard Greene	4
(Scotland) Marcus Campbell	4
(England) Matthew Selt	1
(Republic of Ireland) Fergal O'Brien	4
(England) Stuart Carrington	1
(England) Mark Selby	4
(England) Mitchell Mann	1
(Scotland) Alan McManus	2
(Australia) Ben Judge	4

Last 64; Best of 7 frames
(China) Ding Junhui	4
(Wales) Dominic Dale	0
(Scotland) John Higgins	4
(Northern Ireland) Gerard Greene	2
(Scotland) Marcus Campbell	3
(Republic of Ireland) Fergal O'Brien	4
(England) Mark Selby	4
(Australia) Ben Judge	0

Last 32; Best of 7 frames
(China) Ding Junhui	4
(Scotland) John Higgins	3
(Republic of Ireland) Fergal O'Brien	0
(England) Mark Selby	4

Last 16; Best of 7 frames
(China) Ding Junhui	4
(England) Mark Selby	1

===== Section 7 =====
Last 128; Best of 7 frames
(England) Rory McLeod	4
(England) Adam Duffy	1
(England) Judd Trump	4
(England) James Cahill	1
(England) Robert Milkins	2
(England) Chris Norbury	4
(Republic of Ireland) Ken Doherty	4
(Scotland) Michael Leslie	0
(Belgium) Luca Brecel	4
(Thailand) Thepchaiya Un-Nooh	0
(England) Mark Joyce	4
(England) Jeff Cundy	1
(Thailand) Dechawat Poomjaeng	4
(England) Sam Harvey	0
(Scotland) Jamie Burnett	4
(England) Sean O'Sullivan	1

Last 64; Best of 7 frames
(England) Rory McLeod	4
(England) Judd Trump	0
(England) Chris Norbury	2
(Republic of Ireland) Ken Doherty	4
(Belgium) Luca Brecel	2
(England) Mark Joyce	4
(Thailand) Dechawat Poomjaeng	1
(Scotland) Jamie Burnett	4

Last 32; Best of 7 frames
(England) Rory McLeod	4
(Republic of Ireland) Ken Doherty	1
(England) Mark Joyce	2
(Scotland) Jamie Burnett	4

Last 16; Best of 7 frames
(England) Rory McLeod	3
(Scotland) Jamie Burnett	4

===== Section 8 =====
Last 128; Best of 7 frames
(England) Shaun Murphy	3
(England) Alfie Burden	4
(England) Sam Baird	2
(Norway) Kurt Maflin	4
(Scotland) Scott Donaldson	1
(England) Kyren Wilson	4
(Wales) Ryan Day	1
(Northern Ireland) Joe Swail	4
(Wales) Matthew Stevens	1
(England) Tom Ford	4
(Thailand) James Wattana	4
(Thailand) Passakorn Suwannawat	2
(England) Craig Steadman	4
(England) Martin O'Donnell	3
(England) Jack Lisowski	2
(Scotland) Graeme Dott	4

Last 64; Best of 7 frames
(England) Alfie Burden	0
(Norway) Kurt Maflin	4
(England) Kyren Wilson	4
(Northern Ireland) Joe Swail	1
(England) Tom Ford	4
(Thailand) James Wattana	2
(England) Craig Steadman	1
(Scotland) Graeme Dott	4

Last 32; Best of 7 frames
(Norway) Kurt Maflin	4
(England) Kyren Wilson	2
(England) Tom Ford	0
(Scotland) Graeme Dott	4

Last 16; Best of 7 frames
(Norway) Kurt Maflin	4
(Scotland) Graeme Dott	3

==== Finals ====
Quarter-finals; Best of 7 frames		Semi-finals; Best of 7 frames		Final; Best of 7 frames
(Scotland) Stephen Maguire	4
(England) Jimmy White	1	(Scotland) Stephen Maguire	2
(China) Tian Pengfei	0	(Australia) Neil Robertson	4
(Australia) Neil Robertson	4			(Australia) Neil Robertson	4
(England) Michael Holt	4			(Scotland) Jamie Burnett	3
(China) Ding Junhui	2	(England) Michael Holt	0
(Scotland) Jamie Burnett	4	(Scotland) Jamie Burnett	4
(Norway) Kurt Maflin	3

== Century breaks ==
Only from last 128 onwards.

- 141, 103 – Stephen Maguire
- 140, 106 – Michael Holt
- 135, 108 – David Gilbert
- 134 – Luca Brecel
- 133 – Oliver Lines
- 132, 131, 102 – Jamie Burnett
- 131, 105 – Robert Milkins
- 128, 102 – Martin Gould
- 127 – Paul Davison
- 127 – Stuart Carrington
- 125, 118, 111, 105, 102 – Neil Robertson
- 123 – Liang Wenbo
- 122 – Mark Joyce
- 118 – Matthew Stevens
- 115, 111 – John Higgins
- 115 – Andrew Higginson
- 115 – Marcus Campbell
- 114, 106 – Ding Junhui
- 113 – Stephen Lee
- 112 – Allan Taylor
- 109 – Dechawat Poomjaeng
- 109 – Rory McLeod
- 108 – Kyren Wilson
- 107, 102 – Judd Trump
- 104, 100 – Fergal O'Brien
- 102, 100 – Tian Pengfei
- 102 – Ben Woollaston
- 101 – Barry Pinches
- 100 – Joe Perry
- 100 – Tom Ford
