= 2012 Shanghai Masters =

Bank of Communication Shanghai Masters

Tournament information
- Dates: 17–23 September 2012
- Venue: Shanghai Grand Stage
- City: Shanghai
- Country: China
- Organisation: World Snooker
- Format: Ranking event
- Total prize fund: £410,000
- Winner's share: £75,000
- Highest break: John Higgins (SCO) (147)

Final
- Champion: John Higgins (SCO)
- Runner-up: Judd Trump (ENG)
- Score: 10–9

The 2012 Bank of Communication Shanghai Masters was a professional ranking snooker tournament that took place between 17 and 23 September 2012 at the Shanghai Grand Stage in Shanghai, China. The sixth edition of the tournament since it was first held in 2007, it was the third ranking event of the 2012/2013 season.

Mark Selby was the defending champion, but he lost in the first round 1–5 against Jamie Cope.

John Higgins won his 25th ranking title by defeating Judd Trump 10–9 in the final. During the final Higgins made the 91st official maximum break. This was Higgins's sixth 147 break and also the third maximum break of the 2012/2013 season.

== Prize fund ==
The breakdown of prize money for this year is shown below:

- Winner: £75,000
- Runner-up: £30,000
- Semi-final: £18,000
- Quarter-final: £10,000
- Last 16: £7,500
- Last 32: £6,000
- Last 48: £2,300
- Last 64: £1,500
- Non-televised highest break: £200
- Televised highest break: £2,000
- Televised maximum break: £10,000
- Total: £410,000

== Wildcard round ==
These matches were played in Shanghai on 17 and 18 September 2012.

Match		Score	
WC1	Mark King (ENG)	5–3	Zhao Xintong (CHN)
WC2	Jamie Jones (WAL)	5–2	Lu Ning (CHN)
WC3	Ryan Day (WAL)	5–0	Wang Yuchen (CHN)
WC4	Robert Milkins (ENG)	5–4	Zhou Yuelong (CHN)
WC5	Steve Davis (ENG)	5–1	Zhu Yinghui (CHN)
WC6	Fergal O'Brien (IRL)	2–5	Chen Feilong (CHN)
WC7	Jimmy Robertson (ENG)	4–5	Jin Long (CHN)
WC8	Marco Fu (HKG)	4–5	Lyu Haotian (CHN)

== Main draw ==
Last 32; Best of 9 frames
1	(England) Mark Selby	1
(England) Jamie Cope	5
15	(England) Stuart Bingham	5
(England) Tom Ford	4
10	(China) Ding Junhui	4
(England) Mark King	5
6	(England) Shaun Murphy	5
(Wales) Dominic Dale	4
5	(Scotland) John Higgins	5
(Wales) Jamie Jones	2
13	(England) Martin Gould	4
(Wales) Ryan Day	5
16	(England) Ali Carter	5
(England) Robert Milkins	4
4	(Scotland) Stephen Maguire	5
(England) Peter Ebdon	3
3	(Wales) Mark Williams	5
(England) Mark Davis	1
14	(England) Ricky Walden	5
(England) Steve Davis	4
9	(Wales) Matthew Stevens	2
(England) Joe Perry	5
7	(Australia) Neil Robertson	5
(China) Chen Feilong	2
8	(England) Stephen Lee	5
(Scotland) Marcus Campbell	3
12	(Scotland) Graeme Dott	5
(China) Jin Long	2
11	(Northern Ireland) Mark Allen	5
(China) Lyu Haotian	2
2	(England) Judd Trump	5
(England) Barry Hawkins	3

Last 16; Best of 9 frames
(England) Jamie Cope	1
15	(England) Stuart Bingham	5
(England) Mark King	3
6	(England) Shaun Murphy	5
5	(Scotland) John Higgins	5
(Wales) Ryan Day	0
16	(England) Ali Carter	5
4	(Scotland) Stephen Maguire	0
3	(Wales) Mark Williams	5
14	(England) Ricky Walden	2
(England) Joe Perry	5
7	(Australia) Neil Robertson	0
8	(England) Stephen Lee	1
12	(Scotland) Graeme Dott	5
11	(Northern Ireland) Mark Allen	2
2	(England) Judd Trump	5

Quarter-finals; Best of 9 frames
15	(England) Stuart Bingham	1
6	(England) Shaun Murphy	5
5	(Scotland) John Higgins	5
16	(England) Ali Carter	3
3	(Wales) Mark Williams	5
(England) Joe Perry	4
12	(Scotland) Graeme Dott	4
2	(England) Judd Trump	5

Semi-finals; Best of 11 frames
6	(England) Shaun Murphy	3
5	(Scotland) John Higgins	6
3	(Wales) Mark Williams	4
2	(England) Judd Trump	6

Final; Best of 19 frames
5	(Scotland) John Higgins	10
2	(England) Judd Trump	9

== Final ==
Final: Best of 19 frames. Referee: Michaela Tabb. Shanghai Grand Stage, Shanghai, China, 23 September 2012.
John Higgins (5); Scotland	10–9	Judd Trump (2); England
Afternoon: 0–112 (112), 0–121 (80), 12–92 (74), 16–111 (111), 50–74 (59), 147–0 (147), 37–69 (51), 62–51 (Trump 51), 0–63 (53); Evening: 89–0 (89), 74–22 (74), 78–12, 76–0 (76), 71–0 (71), 64–58, 2–119 (105), 69–31 (64), 47–63, 66–36 (61)
147	Highest break	112
1	Century breaks	3
7	50+ breaks	9

== Qualifying ==
These matches took place between 24 and 27 July 2012 at the World Snooker Academy in Sheffield, England.

Round 1 Best of 9 frames
(Iran) Hossein Vafaei	w/d
(Thailand) Thanawat Thirapongpaiboon	w/o
(China) Chen Zhe	4
(Scotland) Scott Donaldson	5
(England) Paul Davison	2
(India) Aditya Mehta	5
(England) Craig Steadman	3
(Belgium) Luca Brecel	5
(England) Jamie O'Neill	4
(Malta) Tony Drago	5
(England) Ian Burns	5
(India) Pankaj Advani	1
(England) Liam Highfield	5
(China) Zhang Anda	3
(England) David Grace	5
(Scotland) Michael Leslie	2
(England) Robbie Williams	w/o
(Canada) Floyd Ziegler	w/d
(England) Sam Baird	2
(Australia) Ben Judge	5
(England) Martin O'Donnell	4
(Scotland) Fraser Patrick	5
(England) Rod Lawler	5
(Wales) Gareth Allen	0
(Wales) Daniel Wells	1
(Thailand) Thepchaiya Un-Nooh	5
(England) Sean O'Sullivan	4
(China) Tian Pengfei	5
(Norway) Kurt Maflin	w/o
(Egypt) Mohamed Khairy	w/d
(England) Joel Walker	0
(China) Cao Yupeng	5

Round 2 Best of 9 frames
(Thailand) Dechawat Poomjaeng	0
(Thailand) Thanawat Thirapongpaiboon	5
(China) Yu Delu	3
(Scotland) Scott Donaldson	5
(Thailand) James Wattana	2
(India) Aditya Mehta	5
(England) Andy Hicks	5
(Belgium) Luca Brecel	1
(Wales) Michael White	5
(Malta) Tony Drago	4
(Scotland) Alan McManus	4
(England) Ian Burns	5
(Thailand) Passakorn Suwannawat	3
(England) Liam Highfield	5
(China) Li Yan	4
(England) David Grace	5
(England) David Gilbert	5
(England) Robbie Williams	2
(England) Alfie Burden	5
(Australia) Ben Judge	3
(England) Barry Pinches	5
(Scotland) Fraser Patrick	4
(China) Liu Chuang	1
(England) Rod Lawler	5
(England) Peter Lines	2
(Thailand) Thepchaiya Un-Nooh	5
(England) Jimmy Robertson	5
(China) Tian Pengfei	4
(England) Mark Joyce	5
(Norway) Kurt Maflin	2
(England) Adam Duffy	1
(China) Cao Yupeng	5

Round 3 Best of 9 frames
(England) Mike Dunn	0
(Thailand) Thanawat Thirapongpaiboon	5
(England) Nigel Bond	5
(Scotland) Scott Donaldson	1
(England) Matthew Selt	4
(India) Aditya Mehta	5
(Scotland) Anthony McGill	5
(England) Andy Hicks	4
(England) Jimmy White	5
(Wales) Michael White	1
(Scotland) Jamie Burnett	5
(England) Ian Burns	4
(England) Robert Milkins	5
(England) Liam Highfield	4
(China) Xiao Guodong	2
(England) David Grace	5
(Northern Ireland) Gerard Greene	2
(England) David Gilbert	5
(England) Steve Davis	5
(England) Alfie Burden	1
(England) Ben Woollaston	3
(England) Barry Pinches	5
(China) Liang Wenbo	4
(England) Rod Lawler	5
(Republic of Ireland) Ken Doherty	5
(Thailand) Thepchaiya Un-Nooh	4
(England) Jack Lisowski	1
(England) Jimmy Robertson	5
(England) Rory McLeod	4
(England) Mark Joyce	5
(England) Dave Harold	5
(China) Cao Yupeng	3

Round 4 Best of 9 frames
(England) Jamie Cope	5
(Thailand) Thanawat Thirapongpaiboon	4
(England) Tom Ford	5
(England) Nigel Bond	1
(England) Mark King	5
(India) Aditya Mehta	3
(Wales) Dominic Dale	5
(Scotland) Anthony McGill	0
(Wales) Jamie Jones	5
(England) Jimmy White	1
(Wales) Ryan Day	5
(Scotland) Jamie Burnett	4
(England) Michael Holt	3
(England) Robert Milkins	5
(England) Peter Ebdon	5
(England) David Grace	4
(England) Mark Davis	5
(England) David Gilbert	0
(England) Andrew Higginson	0
(England) Steve Davis	5
(England) Joe Perry	5
(England) Barry Pinches	4
(Republic of Ireland) Fergal O'Brien	5
(England) Rod Lawler	0
(Scotland) Marcus Campbell	5
(Republic of Ireland) Ken Doherty	4
(England) Anthony Hamilton	3
(England) Jimmy Robertson	5
(Hong Kong) Marco Fu	5
(England) Mark Joyce	4
(England) Barry Hawkins	5
(England) Dave Harold	4

== Century breaks ==
=== Qualifying stage centuries ===
- 142, 100 – David Gilbert
- 123 – Jamie Cope
- 119 – Mark Joyce
- 117 – Alan McManus
- 108 – Mark King
- 105 – Michael White
- 104 – Cao Yupeng
- 104 – Marcus Campbell
- 102 – Steve Davis
- 100 – Gerard Greene

=== Televised stage centuries ===
- 147, 135, 103 – John Higgins
- 131, 103 – Joe Perry
- 131 – Matthew Stevens
- 130, 103, 102 – Ryan Day
- 124 – Marco Fu
- 120 – Ali Carter
- 114 – Mark King
- 112, 111, 108, 105, 101 – Judd Trump
- 112 – Lyu Haotian
- 112 – Ricky Walden
- 108 – Graeme Dott
- 107 – Shaun Murphy
- 100 – Dominic Dale
