= 2012 Australian Goldfields Open =

Australian Goldfields Open

Tournament information
- Dates: 9–15 July 2012
- Venue: Bendigo Stadium
- City: Bendigo
- Country: Australia
- Organisation: World Snooker
- Format: Ranking event
- Total prize fund: A$435,000
- Winner's share: $70,000
- Highest break: Cao Yupeng (CHN) (143)

Final
- Champion: Barry Hawkins (ENG)
- Runner-up: Peter Ebdon (ENG)
- Score: 9–3

The 2012 Australian Goldfields Open was a professional ranking snooker tournament that took place between 9–15 July 2012 at the Bendigo Stadium in Bendigo, Australia. It was the second ranking event of the 2012/2013 season.

Stuart Bingham was the defending champion, but he lost in the first round 4–5 against Matthew Selt.

Barry Hawkins won his first ranking title by defeating Peter Ebdon 9–3 in the final.

== Prize fund ==
The breakdown of prize money for this year is shown below:

- Winner: A$70,000
- Runner-up: $30,000
- Semi-final: $20,000
- Quarter-final: $15,000
- Last 16: $10,000
- Last 32: $7,500
- Last 48: $2,000
- Non-televised highest break: $500
- Televised highest break: $2,500
- Total: $435,000

== Wildcard round ==
These matches were played in Bendigo on 9 July.

Match		Score	
WC1	Cao Yupeng (CHN)	5–2	Johl Younger (AUS)
WC2	Alan McManus (SCO)	5–0	James Mifsud (AUS)

== Main draw ==
Last 32; Best of 9 frames
1	(England) Stuart Bingham	4
(England) Matthew Selt	5
11	(England) Andrew Higginson	4
(Wales) Ryan Day	5
14	(England) Barry Hawkins	5
(China) Xiao Guodong	1
6	(Wales) Matthew Stevens	5
(China) Liang Wenbo	3
8	(England) Martin Gould	5
(Republic of Ireland) Ken Doherty	3
10	(England) Ali Carter	3
(China) Cao Yupeng	5
12	(England) Mark Davis	5
(England) Jack Lisowski	2
4	(Australia) Neil Robertson	5
(England) Nigel Bond	1
3	(England) Shaun Murphy	5
(Scotland) Marcus Campbell	4
15	(Wales) Dominic Dale	2
(England) Tom Ford	5
13	(England) Peter Ebdon	5
(England) Michael Holt	4
7	(China) Ding Junhui	5
(Scotland) Alan McManus	0
5	(England) Stephen Lee	5
(England) Rory McLeod	4
9	(England) Ricky Walden	4
(England) Jamie Cope	5
16	(England) Joe Perry	1
(Hong Kong) Marco Fu	5
2	(England) Mark Selby	3
(Scotland) Jamie Burnett	5

Last 16; Best of 9 frames
(England) Matthew Selt	5
(Wales) Ryan Day	3
14	(England) Barry Hawkins	5
6	(Wales) Matthew Stevens	2
8	(England) Martin Gould	5
(China) Cao Yupeng	4
12	(England) Mark Davis	5
4	(Australia) Neil Robertson	1
3	(England) Shaun Murphy	5
(England) Tom Ford	1
13	(England) Peter Ebdon	5
7	(China) Ding Junhui	4
5	(England) Stephen Lee	5
(England) Jamie Cope	2
(Hong Kong) Marco Fu	5
(Scotland) Jamie Burnett	1

Quarter-finals; Best of 9 frames
(England) Matthew Selt	3
14	(England) Barry Hawkins	5
8	(England) Martin Gould	2
12	(England) Mark Davis	5
3	(England) Shaun Murphy	4
13	(England) Peter Ebdon	5
5	(England) Stephen Lee	1
(Hong Kong) Marco Fu	5

Semi-finals; Best of 11 frames
14	(England) Barry Hawkins	6
12	(England) Mark Davis	4
13	(England) Peter Ebdon	6
(Hong Kong) Marco Fu	2

Final; Best of 17 frames
14	(England) Barry Hawkins	9
13	(England) Peter Ebdon	3

== Final ==
Final: Best of 17 frames. Referee: Eirian Williams. Bendigo Stadium, Bendigo, Australia, 15 July 2012.
Barry Hawkins (14); England	9–3	Peter Ebdon (13); England
Afternoon: 27–69, 75–8 (57), 80–0 (74), 120–0 (106), 119–0 (114), 7–68 (63), 72–46, 32–64; Evening: 133–0 (133), 65–10, 74–12 (74), 73–40 (51)
133	Highest break	63
3	Century breaks	0
7	50+ breaks	1

== Qualifying ==
These matches were held between 12 and 15 June 2012 at the World Snooker Academy in Sheffield, England.

Round 1 Best of 9 frames
(Thailand) Thepchaiya Un-Nooh	5
(England) Allan Taylor	0
(Iran) Hossein Vafaei	w/d
(England) Mitchell Mann	w/o
(Australia) Ben Judge	0
(England) Robbie Williams	5
(Thailand) Thanawat Thirapongpaiboon	5
(England) Adrian Gunnell	1
(Wales) Daniel Wells	0
(England) Michael Wild	5
(China) Cao Yupeng	5
(England) Paul Davison	2
(England) Sam Baird	5
(England) Jamie O'Neill	0
(China) Chen Zhe	1
(England) Michael Wasley	5
(China) Tian Pengfei	5
(England) Joel Walker	1
(China) Zhang Anda	3
(Scotland) Fraser Patrick	5
(England) Ian Burns	5
(England) Sean O'Sullivan	2
(Scotland) Michael Leslie	2
(Wales) Duane Jones	5
(India) Aditya Mehta	5
(England) Lee Spick	2
(India) Pankaj Advani	5
(England) Justin Astley	1
(Belgium) Luca Brecel	4
(England) Rod Lawler	5
(England) Martin O'Donnell	5
(England) Jeff Cundy	2

Round 2 Best of 9 frames
(England) Adam Duffy	3
(Thailand) Thepchaiya Un-Nooh	5
(Thailand) Passakorn Suwannawat	2
(England) Mitchell Mann	5
(Norway) Kurt Maflin	5
(England) Robbie Williams	4
(England) Craig Steadman	1
(Thailand) Thanawat Thirapongpaiboon	5
(England) Simon Bedford	2
(England) Michael Wild	5
(England) Alfie Burden	2
(China) Cao Yupeng	5
(England) Andy Hicks	3
(England) Sam Baird	5
(China) Yu Delu	2
(England) Michael Wasley	5
(Thailand) Dechawat Poomjaeng	5
(China) Tian Pengfei	4
(Thailand) James Wattana	5
(Scotland) Fraser Patrick	2
(England) Liam Highfield	5
(England) Ian Burns	2
(Malta) Tony Drago	5
(Wales) Duane Jones	1
(England) Barry Pinches	5
(India) Aditya Mehta	4
(China) Li Yan	1
(India) Pankaj Advani	5
(England) Mark Joyce	0
(England) Rod Lawler	5
(England) David Grace	3
(England) Martin O'Donnell	5

Round 3 Best of 9 frames
(England) Matthew Selt	5
(Thailand) Thepchaiya Un-Nooh	3
(Wales) Michael White	5
(England) Mitchell Mann	2
(China) Xiao Guodong	5
(Norway) Kurt Maflin	4
(England) Peter Lines	4
(Thailand) Thanawat Thirapongpaiboon	5
(England) Steve Davis	0
(England) Michael Wild	5
(England) Mike Dunn	2
(China) Cao Yupeng	5
(England) Dave Harold	5
(England) Sam Baird	4
(England) Nigel Bond	5
(England) Michael Wasley	2
(Scotland) Anthony McGill	5
(Thailand) Dechawat Poomjaeng	3
(England) Jimmy Robertson	4
(Thailand) James Wattana	5
(England) Jimmy White	w/d
(England) Liam Highfield	w/o
(Scotland) Alan McManus	5
(Malta) Tony Drago	4
(England) Ben Woollaston	1
(England) Barry Pinches	5
(China) Liu Chuang	5
(India) Pankaj Advani	2
(Northern Ireland) Gerard Greene	5
(England) Rod Lawler	3
(England) David Gilbert	5
(England) Martin O'Donnell	0

Round 4 Best of 9 frames
(Wales) Jamie Jones	2
(England) Matthew Selt	5
(Wales) Ryan Day	5
(Wales) Michael White	2
(Republic of Ireland) Fergal O'Brien	2
(China) Xiao Guodong	5
(China) Liang Wenbo	5
(Thailand) Thanawat Thirapongpaiboon	1
(Republic of Ireland) Ken Doherty	5
(England) Michael Wild	0
(England) Anthony Hamilton	w/d
(China) Cao Yupeng	w/o
(England) Jack Lisowski	5
(England) Dave Harold	2
(England) Mark King	4
(England) Nigel Bond	5
(Scotland) Marcus Campbell	5
(Scotland) Anthony McGill	0
(England) Tom Ford	5
(Thailand) James Wattana	4
(England) Michael Holt	5
(England) Liam Highfield	2
(England) Robert Milkins	2
(Scotland) Alan McManus	5
(England) Rory McLeod	5
(England) Barry Pinches	0
(England) Jamie Cope	5
(China) Liu Chuang	2
(Hong Kong) Marco Fu	5
(Northern Ireland) Gerard Greene	2
(Scotland) Jamie Burnett	5
(England) David Gilbert	3

== Century breaks ==
=== Qualifying stage centuries ===
- 142, 116, 102 – Barry Pinches
- 140 – Mitchell Mann
- 136, 109 – Xiao Guodong
- 134, 121, 101 – Marco Fu
- 130, 101 – Cao Yupeng
- 130, 101 – Jimmy Robertson
- 126, 121 – Liu Chuang
- 119 – Ken Doherty
- 114, 112 – Liang Wenbo
- 113 – Tony Drago
- 112 – James Wattana
- 108 – Tom Ford
- 104, 102 – Michael Wild
- 104 – Jack Lisowski
- 103 – Sam Baird
- 102 – David Gilbert
- 101 – Aditya Mehta
- 101 – Thepchaiya Un-Nooh
- 100 – Ian Burns

=== Televised stage centuries ===
- 143, 102 – Cao Yupeng
- 135, 113 – Neil Robertson
- 133, 114, 106, 102 – Barry Hawkins
- 129, 113 – Ding Junhui
- 128 – Matthew Stevens
- 128 – Joe Perry
- 126, 105 – Stephen Lee
- 111 – Peter Ebdon
- 111 – Shaun Murphy
- 108, 108 – Marco Fu
- 106 – Rory McLeod
- 103 – Jamie Cope
