= Neil Robertson =

Australian snooker player (born 1982)

Neil Robertson OAM
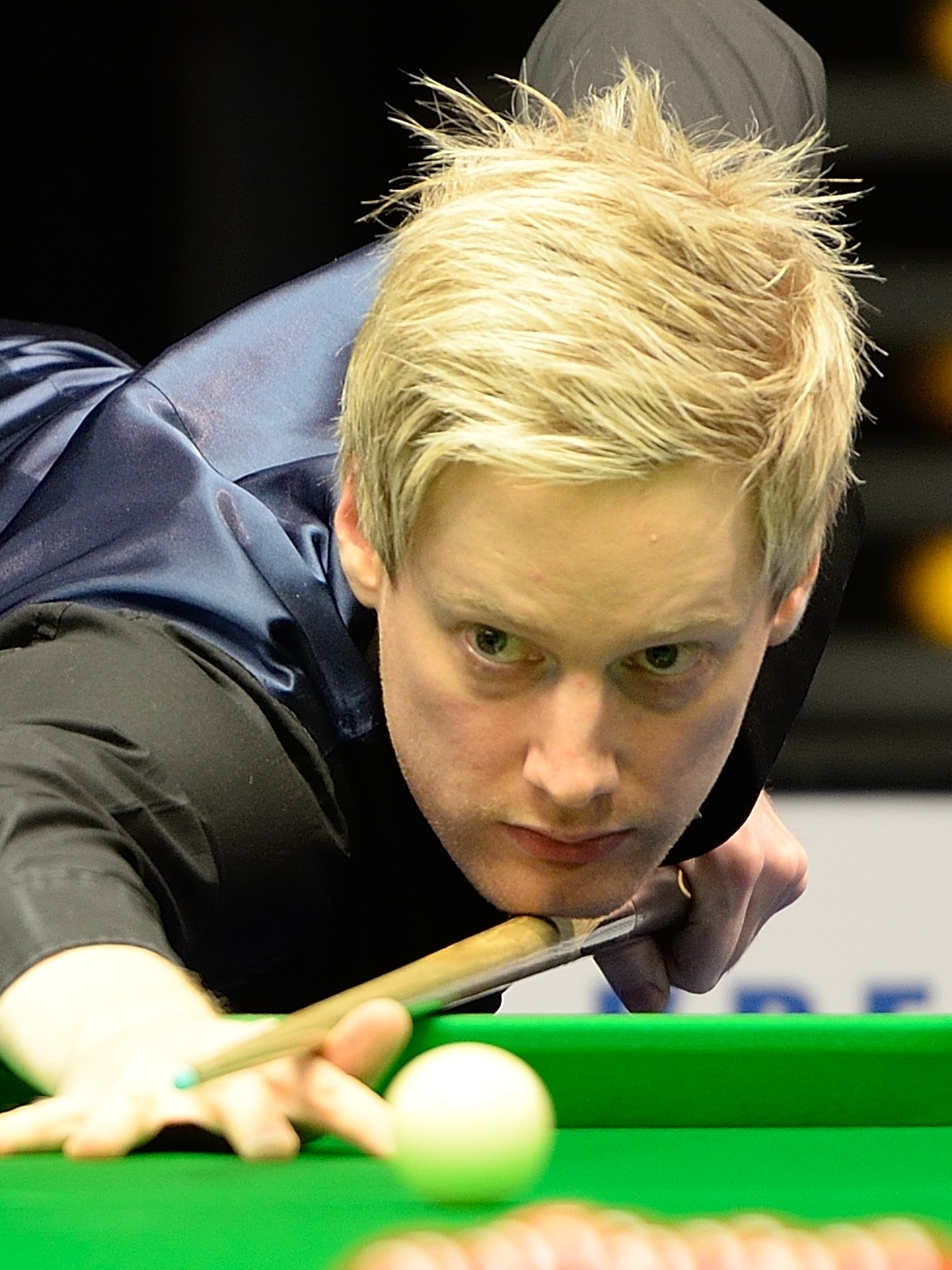
- Robertson at the 2015 German Masters

Personal information
- Nickname: The Thunder from Down-Under
- Born: 11 February 1982 (age 44) Melbourne, Victoria, Australia

Sport
- Sport: Snooker
- Professional: 1998/1999, 2000–2002, 2003–present
- Highest ranking: 1 (September–December 2010, June 2013–May 2014, July–August 2014, December 2014–January 2015)
- Current ranking: 3 (as of 7 November 2026)
- Maximum breaks: 5
- Century breaks: 1,055 (as of 21 November 2026)

Tournament wins
- Ranking: 26
- Minor-ranking: 4
- World Championship: 2010

Neil Alexander Robertson (born 11 February 1982) is an Australian professional snooker player, who is a former world champion and former world number one. He is the only non-UK born player to have completed snooker's Triple Crown, having won the World Championship in 2010, the Masters in 2012 and 2022, and the UK Championship in 2013, 2015 and 2020. He has claimed 26 career ranking titles and won at least one professional tournament each year between 2006 and 2022.

Robertson first turned professional in the 1998‍–‍99 season but dropped off the tour. He rejoined the tour for the 2003‍–‍04 season where his results improved, later becoming the first Australian to win a ranking event when he won the 2006 Grand Prix. In 2009, he reached the semi-finals of the World Championships for the first time, and the following year he won his first world title, defeating Graeme Dott in the final. In 2012, he won his first Masters title, and in 2013, he won his first UK Championship title, becoming the eighth player to complete the triple crown. He won the UK Championship again in 2015, becoming the first player to score a maximum break in a triple crown final. He won the event for a third time in 2020, scoring a tournament record 13 centuries.

Robertson has continued to win tournaments into his forties, with his most recent ranking event victory coming at the 2025 Saudi Arabia Snooker Masters. He is one of four players to have compiled over 1,000 career century breaks in professional competition, including five maximum breaks. In the 2013–14 season, he became the first player to make 100 centuries in a single season, finishing with a then-record 103 centuries. Robertson was named World Snooker Tour Player of the Year for the 2021–22 season. Robertson plays left-handed and is a member of the World Snooker Tour Hall of Fame.

== Life and career ==
=== Early career ===
Robertson first played snooker aged 11 at the pool club owned by his family. He started his snooker career aged 14, and was victorious in the Australian under-18 snooker championship. Robertson left school aged 15 with no qualifications to pursue his ambition of becoming a professional snooker player. His professional career began in the 1998–99 season, and at the age of 17 he reached the fourth qualifying round of the 1999 World Championship where he was defeated by Leo Fernandez. Two years later, Robertson entered qualifying for the 2001 World Championship where he was again beaten in the fourth qualifying round, this time by Ian McCulloch.

During the 2001‍–‍02 season, Robertson relocated from Melbourne to Leicester, England, and developed homesickness. Reflecting back on his time there, Robertson said: "I didn’t enjoy living there at all. It was completely different to Melbourne, so I really struggled." He tried to qualify for the 2002 World Championship, but was unsuccessful, losing to James Reynolds in the first qualifying round. Robertson dropped off the main tour and returned to Australia where he worked in a pub. He continued to play the game, and in July 2003 he won the World Under-21 Snooker Championship in New Zealand, before moving back to the United Kingdom and rejoining the main tour. This time, Robertson lived in Cambridge with two friends and adjusted much quicker. In December 2003, he won the Masters Qualifying Event to book a place at the 2004 Masters, where he was knocked out of the tournament 2–6 by Jimmy White in the opening round. Robertson described his experience of playing White as being "like a rabbit in the headlights." Robertson's first ranking event quarter-final came at the 2004 European Open, where he was eliminated again by White (3–5). Robertson failed to qualify for the 2004 World Championship, exiting in the fifth round of qualifying following a defeat to Stephen Maguire.

In the 2004–05 season, Robertson reached the quarter-finals at the 2005 Welsh Open. He whitewashed Robert Milkins in the first round, before progressing past both White and John Higgins. He then suffered a 4–5 defeat by Ronnie O'Sullivan. He also made it to the quarter-finals of the Malta Cup by defeating Mark Williams and White, but then succumbed to Higgins who beat him 2–5. Robertson later qualified for the 2005 World Championship, losing 7–10 to Stephen Hendry in the first round.

In 2005–06, he reached the top 16 of the rankings by the end of the season. He reached the semi-finals at the Northern Ireland Trophy, where he led 4–1, but ended up losing 4–6 to Matthew Stevens. Robertson also made it to the quarter-finals of the 2005 UK Championship, where he lost 5–9 to Ding Junhui, and the 2006 World Championship, in which he fought back from 8–12 down to level at 12–12 against Graeme Dott, before losing the final frame by inadvertently potting the final pink which he needed on the table in his attempts to snooker Dott.

=== Breakthrough: first ranking title ===
During the 2006–07 season, Robertson secured his maiden ranking title win at the 2006 Grand Prix. He beat O'Sullivan in the quarter-finals and Alan McManus in the semi-finals to reach his first ranking final. This also marked the first time an Australian had made it to a ranking event final since Warren King in 1990. In the final, his opponent was the unseeded Jamie Cope whom he defeated 9–5, becoming the first Australian to win a ranking event. Afterwards, he had early exits in both the 2006 UK Championship (5–9 to Robin Hull), and the 2007 Masters (2‍–‍6 to Maguire). He then made it to the final of the Welsh Open. He defeated Hendry in the last 16 and then overcame O'Sullivan in the quarter-finals. After that he beat Steve Davis in the semi-finals, and Andrew Higginson 9–8 to take the title. Robertson recovered from 6–8 down to win. He reached the second round of the 2007 World Championship, but lost 10–13 to O'Sullivan.

Robertson started the 2007–08 season with early exits in three of the first four ranking events, as well as at the 2008 Masters in January, where he lost (5–6 to Marco Fu). His Welsh Open title defence also ended early, as he was defeated in the last 16 by Ali Carter 3–5. At the 2008 World Championship, Robertson was defeated in the last 16 by Maguire 7–13, and he finished the season ranked tenth.

In the 2008–09 season, Robertson progressed to the final of the Bahrain Championship, where he played Stevens. The match lasted almost six hours in total, with Robertson triumphing 9–7. During their quarter-final match at the 2009 Masters, Robertson and his opponent Maguire set a record of five consecutive century breaks. Robertson made two centuries and Maguire made three: Robertson lost the match 3–6. At the 2009 World Championship, Robertson defeated Davis, Carter and Maguire to reach the semi-finals of the World Championship for the first time, before losing to Shaun Murphy 14–17, after recovering from 7–14 behind to level at 14–14.

=== 2009–2013 ===
In October 2009, Robertson clinched the Grand Prix trophy in Glasgow with a 9–4 win over Ding. It was the first ranking event final since 1985 to feature two overseas players, and he compiled his 100th career century during the event. Robertson's fourth ranking title made him the most prolific player from outside the UK and Ireland in terms of career ranking-event victories. At the China Open, Robertson made his first official maximum break. The break secured him £20,000 in prize money but he lost his second-round match against Peter Ebdon 1–5.

Robertson defeated Fergal O'Brien in his opening match at the 2010 World Championship 10–5, and he then recovered from 5–11 down to win 13–12 against Martin Gould in their second-round match. He then defeated Davis 13–5 and Carter 17–12 to reach the final, where he overcame Dott 18–13. Robertson was the first player from outside the UK and Ireland to win the title since Canada's Cliff Thorburn in 1980. Record books show that Robertson was the second Australian player to win the world snooker title, however Horace Lindrum who won in 1952 is not widely regarded as a credible world champion because the sport's leading players staged a boycott that year. As a result, some observers consider Robertson to be the first Australian world snooker champion. The win took Robertson to a career-high ranking of world number two.

At the 2010 World Open, Robertson reached the final where he beat O'Sullivan 5–1 to confirm his position as world number one. He was invited to the 2010 Premier League Snooker, where he progressed to the semi-finals, but lost 1–5 against O'Sullivan. Robertson reached the quarter-finals of the 2010 UK Championship, where he lost 7–9 to Murphy, and the quarter-finals of the 2011 Masters, losing 4–6 to Mark Allen. He could not defend his title at the 2011 World Championship, as he was defeated 8–10 in the first round by Judd Trump. Robertson became the latest player to fail to defend his first world title, supposedly a victim of the Crucible curse, where no first time winner has ever successfully defended their title at the Crucible.

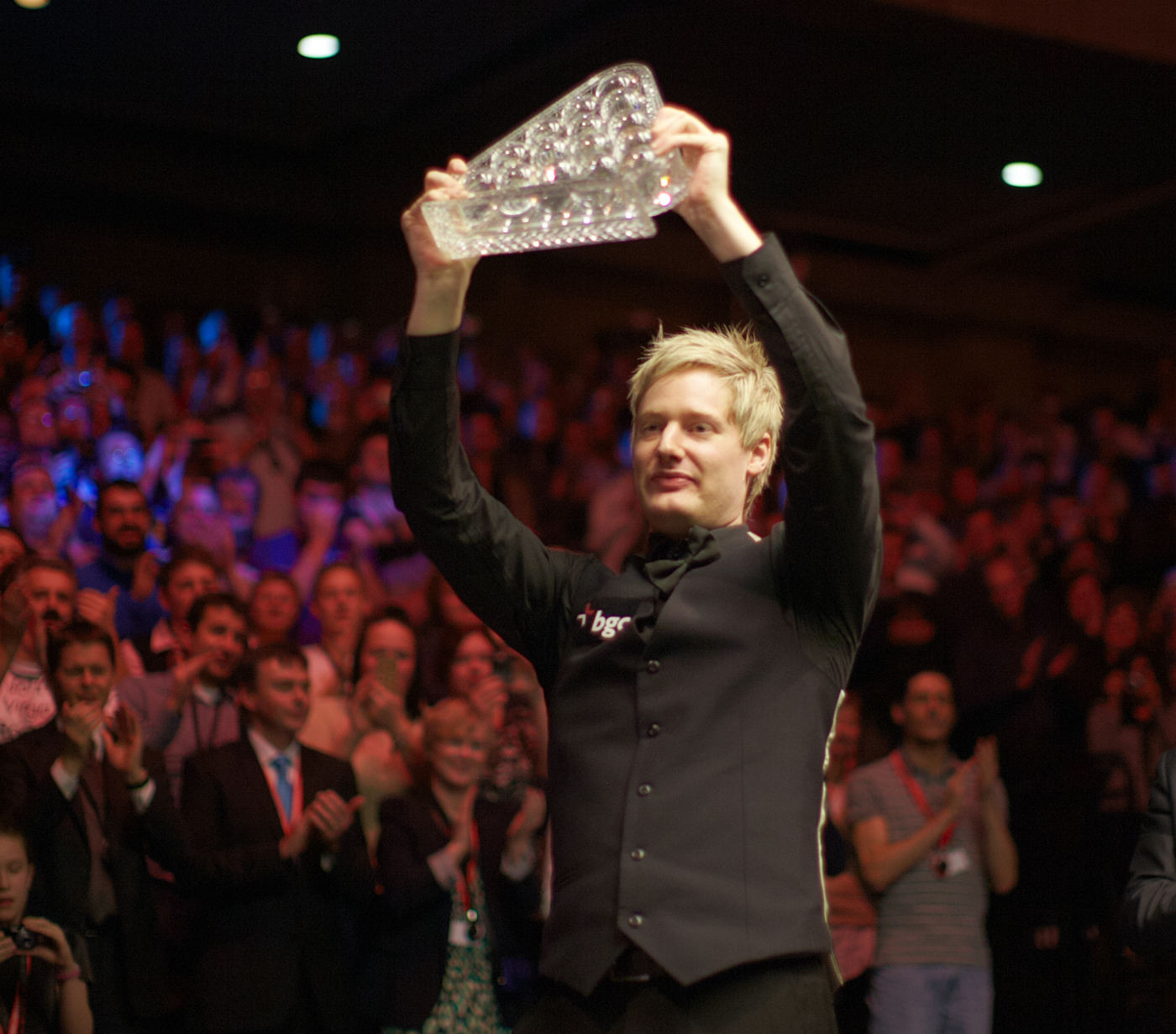
Robertson winning the Masters in 2012

In the 2011–12 season, Robertson suffered a defeat to Dominic Dale in the last 16 of his home tournament, the Australian Goldfields Open. At the Shanghai Masters, he reached the semi-finals before losing 5–6 to Williams. His first silverware of the season came in Warsaw at the PTC Event 6, where he beat Ricky Walden 4–1 in the final. This success was followed by another PTC title in Event 8 where he again won 4–1, this time against Trump. He would later finish third in the Order of Merit (Note: The PTC Order of Merit is determined by money won on the European Tour for that particular season.) and therefore qualify for the 2012 PTC Finals. His form continued into the 2011 UK Championship in York, where he beat Tom Ford, Dott and Ding en route to his first semi-final at the event. He played Trump but was eliminated 7–9.

Robertson won the 2012 Masters by defeating Murphy 10–6. He overcame Allen and Williams in the opening two rounds, before facing Trump in the semi-finals. Robertson secured a 6–3 win and said after the match that he had been spurred on by fans cheering when Trump fluked shots. Earlier in the tournament Robertson had offered to buy a pint of beer for anyone attending his matches in an Australian hat or shirt, In the final, he secured a 5–3 lead over Murphy in the first session, and then went on secure the win and become the fourth man from outside the United Kingdom to win the event.

Robertson later saw his run of nine televised finals without defeat come to an end when he was whitewashed 0–4 by Stephen Lee in the PTC Finals. Robertson was drawn to play Ken Doherty in the first round of the 2012 World Championship. Robertson won the match 10–4, then beat qualifier David Gilbert 13–9 to set up a quarter-final clash with O'Sullivan. Robertson was 5–3 ahead after the first session, but his opponent won six frames in a row and Robertson went on to lose 10–13. He finished the season ranked world number seven.

In the 2012‍–‍13 season, Robertson suffered some early defeats after losing in the first round of the Wuxi Classic and the second round of the Australian Goldfields Open. He was then victorious at the Gdynia Open in Poland. He sealed the minor-ranking title by defeating Jamie Burnett 4–3 in the final. At the inaugural International Championship in Chengdu, China, Robertson made the final and led Trump 8–6, but then lost four consecutive frames to suffer an 8–10 defeat. He then reached the quarter-finals of the 2012 UK Championship to face Mark Selby. Robertson let slip a 4–0 lead to lose 4–6 in a match that finished after midnight.

Robertson began 2013 by attempting to defend his Masters title. He reached the final where he faced Selby. Robertson won three frames from 3–8 down in the final, before Selby held off the fightback by taking the two frames he required to win 6–10. Robertson finished fifth on the PTC Order of Merit to qualify for the Tour Championship Finals. He made it to the final to face Ding, but from 3–0 ahead he lost four consecutive frames as Ding triumphed 3–4.

At the China Open, Robertson won his seventh career ranking event. He advanced to the final and earned a 6–10 victory over Selby, moving to world number two in the process. In the 2013 World Championship, he lost to Milkins 8–10 in the first round, saying afterwards that he should have gone out to win the match rather than getting too involved in safety. He finished the season ranked world number two. In 2013, Robertson was named in the World Snooker Tour Hall of Fame.

=== 2013–2017 ===
In May 2013, Robertson made the second official maximum break of his career in the Wuxi Classic qualifiers against Mohamed Khairy. In the main stage of the tournament, he defeated Higgins 10–7 in the final to secure his eighth ranking event title. At the Australian Goldfields Open, Robertson made it past the second round for the first time in his career before continuing his run to make the final. He had the opportunity to become the first man since O'Sullivan in 2003 to win back-to-back ranking events in the same season, but was unsuccessful, losing 6–9 to Fu. Robertson defeated Selby 10–7 in the final of the 2013 UK Championship in December, becoming the eighth player to win all three Triple Crown events. Robertson also had the distinction of becoming the first player from outside the United Kingdom to have achieved this feat.

In January 2014, during the Championship League, Robertson reached 63 century breaks in a single professional season, breaking the previous record of 61 centuries held by Trump. By early February, he had reached 78 centuries, a feat that O'Sullivan called "probably the most phenomenal scoring in the history of the game." At the China Open, he reached the final, where he lost 5–10 to Ding. He also increased his tally of centuries to 93.

Robertson extended his total of centuries for the season to 99 in his first two 2014 World Championship matches. He missed a black on a break of 94 that would have seen him reach the 100 milestone during his win over Allen. In the 22nd frame of his quarter-final clash against Trump, Robertson made his 100th century break of the season, which also levelled the scores at 11–11. Robertson, having trailed 2–6 and 8–11, went on to win the match 13–11 to set up a semi-final against Selby. Speaking about his 100th century, Robertson stated: I wasn't even thinking about the century until there were only a few balls left and the frame was finished – then I really went for it. I would rather make the century of centuries here than a 147." Selby then defeated him 17–15 in a match that saw Robertson make three more century breaks to end his tally for the season at 103. He ended the season as the world number three.

Robertson advanced to the final of the Wuxi Classic early in the 2014–15 season where he played friend and practice partner Joe Perry. Robertson led 8–6 before Perry won three frames in a row to be one away from the title. Robertson fought back, securing the two final frames to win the match 10–9. He paid tribute to Perry's influence on his own career after the match, saying: "Joe is one of my best friends on tour and if it wasn't for him I wouldn't be here today." A week later, he won through to the final of the Australian Goldfields Open but was beaten in the final for the second year in a row, this time 5–9 by Trump. Robertson reclaimed the world number one spot afterwards. Robertson trailed Dott 0–5 in the fourth round of the 2014 UK Championship, but then made five breaks above 50 to draw level, before falling short of a comeback win as Dott took the final frame to clinch a 5–6 win.

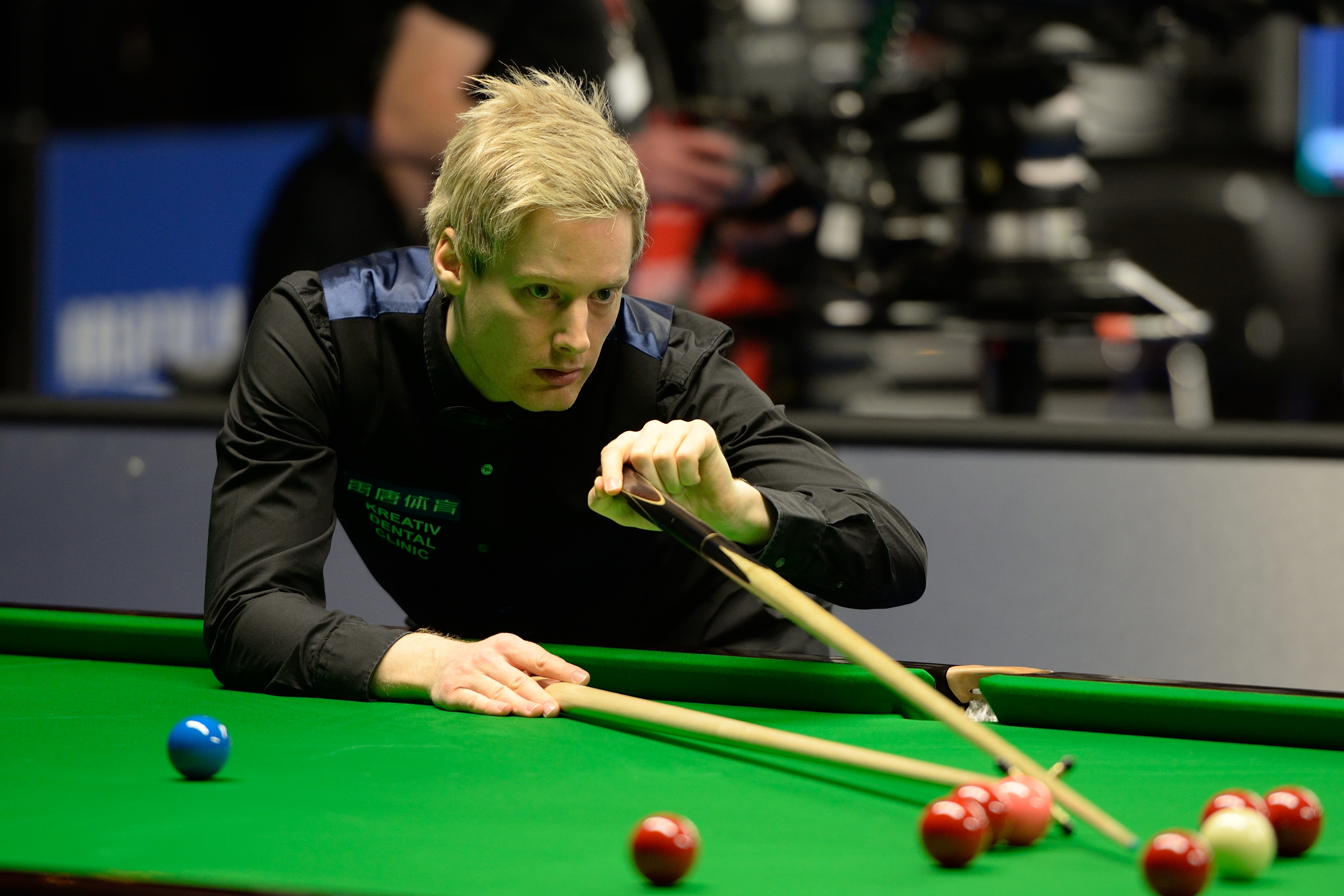
Robertson at the 2015 German Masters

At the 2015 Masters, Robertson progressed to the final after defeating O'Sullivan 6–1 in the semi-finals, marking the first time O'Sullivan had ever lost a semi-finals match in the competition after ten previous wins. In the final, Robertson suffered the heaviest defeat in the Masters since 1988, as Murphy outplayed him to triumph 2–10. He won his only European Tour event of the year at the Gdynia Open by beating Williams 4–0, his third career title in Poland. Robertson secured emphatic 10–2 and 13–5 wins over Jamie Jones and Carter to face Barry Hawkins in the quarter-finals of the 2015 World Championship. Both players compiled four centuries to match a World Championship record of eight centuries in a best-of-25-frames match, but eventually Robertson lost 12–13. After the tournament, Robertson, who had won four ranking titles since his world title in 2010, stated: "I truly believe I have underachieved in my career."

In the 2015 Champion of Champions in November, Robertson claimed his first major title in over twelve months. At the UK Championship, in their third-round match, Thepchaiya Un-Nooh missed the final black for a 147, before Robertson made a 145 break in the next frame and went on to win 6–2. Later in the event, he whitewashed Selby 6–0 in their semi-final and then captured the title for the second time with a 10–5 win against Liang Wenbo in the final. Robertson also became the first player to make a 147 break in a Triple Crown final. It was the first final in the event not to feature a player from the United Kingdom.

Robertson and Trump set a record of six centuries in a best-of-11-frames match (four from Trump and two from Robertson) in the second round of the 2016 Masters, with Robertson exiting 5–6. At the Welsh Open, he overcame Allen in the semi-finals to set up a final with O'Sullivan. Robertson took a 5–2 lead, but O'Sullivan produced a comeback by winning seven frames in a row. Following this, he ended the season with a first-round defeat at the 2016 World Championship where he was eliminated 6‍–‍10 by Michael Holt.

At the 2016 Riga Masters, Robertson did not lose more than one frame in any match as he reached the final, in which he secured his twelfth ranking title with a 5–2 win over Holt. He also played in the semi-finals of the European Masters where he was whitewashed 0–6 by O'Sullivan, and he then lost 3–6 to Peter Lines in the first round of the 2016 UK Championship. Robertson exited the 2017 Masters at the quarter-finals stage with a 3–6 defeat against O'Sullivan, and was also knocked out at the same stage of the Players Championship 3–5 by Carter. Robertson suffered an 11–13 loss to Fu in the second round of the World Snooker Championship. Robertson described his performance as "garbage", and declared his intention to change tactics next season, in a bid to improve his game. He stated: "I am going to play a lot more aggressive and with a lot more freedom."

=== 2017–2021 ===
In July, Robertson secured victory at the non-ranking 2017 Hong Kong Masters after a 6–3 win against O'Sullivan in the final. He reached his first ranking event final in over a year at the Scottish Open in December, and he recovered from 4–8 down in the final to seal a 9–8 victory against Cao Yupeng. In March 2018, Robertson was a quarter-finalist at the Players Championship, but suffered a 1–6 defeat by Trump. He exited the China Open at the semi-finals, losing 6–10 to Hawkins, and at the 2018 World Championship, Robertson lost in the first round 5–10 against Milkins.

At the first ranking event of the 2018–19 season, the Riga Masters, Robertson won the event for the second time by defeating Jack Lisowski 5–2 in the final. He also reached the final at the International Championship, but was defeated 5–10 by Allen, to whom Robertson also lost in the quarter-finals of the 2018 Champion of Champions 1–6 a few days later.

In January 2019, Robertson made it into the semi-finals of the 2019 Masters, but was eliminated by Trump 4–6. Robertson won the Welsh Open, with a 9–7 victory over Stuart Bingham in the final. His second Welsh Open crown took him past £4m in career prize money earnings and helped him rise to world number eight. Robertson was runner-up to O'Sullivan in both the Players Championship (4–10) and the Tour Championship (11–13). Later in the season, Robertson won the China Open for the second time after defeating Lisowski 11–4. Victory marked the first time that he had won three ranking events in the same season. The win also helped Robertson climb three places to fourth in the world rankings. At the 2019 World Championship, he prevailed 13–6 against Murphy in the second round before losing 10–13 to Higgins in the quarter-finals.

Robertson started the 2019–20 season as world number four, but due to technical issues linked with a flight, he was not able to defend his title at the opening ranking tournament of the season, the Riga Masters. He made it to the semi-finals at the non-ranking Shanghai Masters, but was beaten 6–10 by O'Sullivan. In October 2019, Robertson forfeited his place at the 2019 World Open qualifiers after mistakenly setting his sat-nav to Barnsley, Gloucestershire, instead of the Barnsley Metrodome in Yorkshire, 170 miles away. In November, Robertson won the invitational Champion of Champions for the second time by edging out Trump 10–9 in the final. Robertson hit five centuries during the match, including a 137 break in the final frame. After the match, Robertson said: "It is the best match I have ever been involved in."

At the 2020 Masters, he was eliminated in the first round by Maguire 5–6 despite leading 5–1. After the Masters, he reached three consecutive ranking finals: the European Masters, German Masters and the World Grand Prix. He won the European Masters, whitewashing Zhou Yuelong 9–0, and the World Grand Prix by defeating Dott 10–8. He made five centuries against Dott in the final to help secure his 18th ranking title win. At the German Masters, he suffered a 6–9 defeat to Trump. Robertson entered the 2020 World Championship as world number two, but lost in the quarter-finals 7–13 to Selby.

In the 2020–21 season, Robertson was the runner up at the English Open, losing 8–9 to Trump, and the Champion of Champions, where he was beaten by Allen 6–10. In December, he won his third UK Championship title, defeating Trump 10–9 in the final. Robertson became the fifth player to win the triple crown event at least three times. He also scored 13 centuries during the tournament, a record for a single UK Championship. At the beginning of 2021 he suffered a 5–6 first-round exit at the Masters to Yan Bingtao, but in March he won the Tour Championship, securing a 10–4 victory against O'Sullivan in the final. O'Sullivan praised Robertson's performance saying: "I've never seen anyone play as well as that." He was a quarter-finalist three other times throughout the season, in the European Masters, the Players Championship, and again in the 2021 World Championship, where Kyren Wilson knocked him out of the tournament 8‍–‍13.

=== 2021–2025 ===
In November, Robertson won the English Open by defeating Higgins 9–8: this marked his third different Home Nations title, having previously been victorious in both the Scottish Open and the Welsh Open. Later that month, his UK Championship title defence was ended in a surprise first-round defeat by amateur player John Astley. Robertson reached the final of the 2021 World Grand Prix, but was edged out 8–10 by O'Sullivan.

In January, he won the Masters for the second time, triumphing 6–5 against Williams in a dramatic semi-final where he needed two snookers to win the final frame. After the match, Robertson said: "Never give up, never ever give up. Any kids out there watching this, anyone, does not matter how it looks, just don't give up." He went on to lift the trophy after winning 10–4 against Hawkins in the final. His sixth Triple Crown success moved him up to eighth place on the all time winners list for these events. Aged 39, Robertson revealed that becoming a multiple world champion was his "last thing to tick". He explained that NFL player Tom Brady was someone he looked up to, saying: "It's not too late to become a three or four-time world champion. Look at Tom Brady, he is a massive inspiration."

Robertson then won the 2022 Players Championship, beating Hawkins again, this time 10–5. His maiden win in the event moved him up to second in the world rankings. In April, he successfully defended his Tour Championship title, winning 10–9 against Higgins in the final, coming back after earlier trailing 4–9. At the end of the season, his fifth career maximum break came at the 2022 World Championship, in the 19th frame of his second-round match against Lisowski. He eventually ended up losing the contest 12–13, marking the eighth consecutive year that Robertson had failed to make the semi-finals of the competition. Robertson brushed off the defeat, saying: "The season I've had has been the season of absolute dreams." At the World Snooker Tour awards for the 2021–22 season, Robertson was named player of the year.

At the beginning of the 2022–23 season, Robertson missed the 2022 Championship League, as well as the European Masters and the British Open. He stated that he chose to opt out of the events and said: "I used to play in most tournaments, but I'm playing for fun now. I've got a young family now so I don't need to play in every tournament these days. My family is really important to me, they're my inspiration to win." He then participated in the 2022 World Mixed Doubles with Mink Nutcharut. The pair overcame Selby and Rebecca Kenna 4–2 in the final.

Robertson exited at the semi-final stage of the 2022 Hong Kong Masters, losing to O'Sullivan 4–6; the Northern Ireland Open, being beaten by Allen 2–6; the Scottish Open, in which he was defeated by Joe O'Connor 3–6; and the English Open, where his 4–6 loss to Mark Selby saw the end of his title defence, as well as ending his seven match winning streak against Selby. He failed to defend his Masters title as he lost 4–6 against Murphy in his opening match of the 2023 event. Robertson reached the second round of the 2023 World Championship where he lost 7–13 to Jak Jones.

During the 2023–24 season, Robertson make early exits in the English Open and Northern Ireland Open. He had a deeper run at the Shanghai Masters, where he reached the semi-finals, but lost the match 7–10 to Luca Brecel. He recorded his 900th career century in September at the Wuhan Open qualifiers, becoming just the fourth player to hit this milestone. After the Wuhan Open in October, Robertson revealed on social media that he was feeling homesick, so he would take an extended break at the end of the year to go home to Australia. His last tournament of the year was the 2023 UK Championship, where a first-round loss (2–6 to Zhou Yuelong) meant that his streak of winning at least one title each calendar year since 2006 had ended. Robertson made it to the semi-finals of the 2024 World Open. He was unable to progress to the final, exiting the tournament after suffering a 5–6 defeat to Ding. This meant that for the first time since 2006, Robertson fell out of the top 16 in the world rankings and had to qualify for the 2024 World Championship. He then lost 9–10 to Jones in a final frame decider during qualifying, missing out on playing at the Crucible for the first time since 2004.

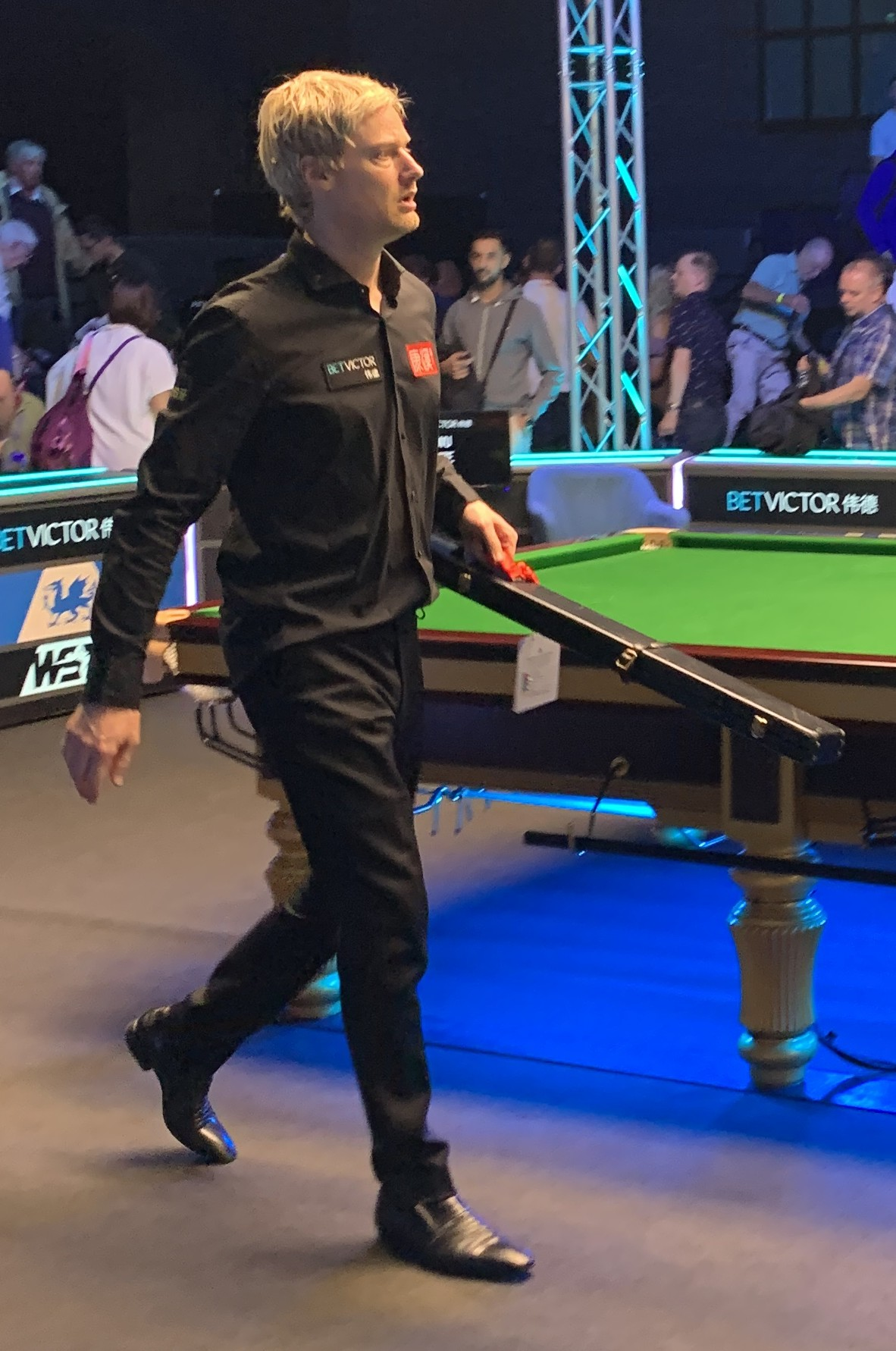
Robertson at the final of the 2024 English Open. He defeated Wu Yize 9–7 to win the title.

Robertson reached the quarter-finals at the inaugural Saudi Arabia Masters early in the 2024–25 season, before losing to Trump 3–6. He won the English Open in September, defeating Wu Yize 9–7 in the final to secure his first ranking title in more than two years and a return to the world's top 16. Robertson was defeated in the first round by Trump 3–6 at the 2024 UK Championship after letting slip a 3–1 lead. After slipping to 17th in the world rankings, Robertson did not qualify for the 2025 Masters, however he received a late call-up after O'Sullivan withdrew from the tournament. Robertson recovered from 1–5 down to beat Higgins in the first round, winning five consecutive frames to remain in the competition, but was then beaten 2–6 by Murphy in their quarter-final.

Robertson received £150,000 after topping the Home Nations Series Order of Merit. The award was based on the combined performances of players across the English, Scottish, Welsh and Northern Ireland Opens for the season. He then won his 25th ranking title at the Grand Prix. He whitewashed Bingham 10–0 in the final, becoming the first player to ever win two multi-session finals without losing a frame. The result pushed Robertson back into the top 16 of the world rankings again. Ahead of the forthcoming 2025 World Championship, Robertson stated that he had started working with a sports psychologist after failing to qualify for the previous edition of the event. He credited this as a contributing factor to his improved ranking for the year. At the World Championships, he suffered an early exit, losing to Chris Wakelin 8–10 in the first round.

=== 2025–2027 ===
In July 2025, the World Professional Billiards and Snooker Association (WPBSA) announced that Robertson had joined the Players Board of the Association. The role enabled him to represent the 'feelings and views' of his fellow competitors. The following month, he won £500,000 and moved up to number three in the world rankings after defeating O'Sullivan 10–9 in the final of the Saudi Arabia Masters. After the match, Robertson said: "I think this probably surpasses the World Championship because I have had to answer a lot of questions. To beat Ronnie here with so much on the line is definitely my best ever." In September, during qualifying for the International Championship, Robertson became the fourth player to record 1000 career centuries, joining O'Sullivan, Higgins and Trump as the only players to have achieved the feat.

In November, Robertson finished runner-up to Zhao Xintong at the Riyadh Season Snooker Championship, after losing 2–5 in the final. The following month, he progressed through to the semi-finals of the UK Championship but his run was ended with a defeat to Trump. Robertson was defeated by Kyren Wilson in a final-frame decider in the quarter-finals of the Masters, and he was defeated 4–10 by Trump in the semi-finals of the Tour Championship. Robertson progressed to the quarter-finals of the 2026 World Championship, where he took a 9–7 lead into the final session against Higgins but lost 10–13.

Robertson contested a quarter-final match against Zhao at the Wuhan Open knowing that the winner would become the new world number one. In the end, it was Zhao who secured the top spot with a 5–1 victory. He progressed to the semi-finals of the Champion of Champions, but was defeated 2–6 by Wakelin.

== Playing style ==
Robertson plays left-handed. In 2020, Eurosport named Robertson as the second best long-potter in the sport behind Trump. They also acknowledged the improvements that he had made to his tactical game and described him as having one of the best all round games in snooker history. Also that year, O'Sullivan described Robertson as having the "best cue action there has ever been."

== Personal life ==
Robertson was born on 11 February 1982 in Melbourne, Victoria, Australia. He has a younger brother, Marc Robertson, a former snooker amateur who became a professional pool player. Robertson attended Norwood Secondary College in Ringwood. As of 2020, he reportedly lives in Cambridge, England, and practises at WT's Snooker and Sporting Club in the city. He has two children with his Norwegian wife Mille, whom he met in 2008 and married in August 2021. Mille had been due to give birth to the couple's first child while Robertson was playing in the 2010 World Snooker Championship final, but their son was not born until a few days later. Robertson has spoken publicly about supporting his wife through her struggles with anxiety and depression, while also acknowledging how these issues affected his commitment to professional snooker.

Robertson has been a vegan since 2014. He began to pursue a plant-based diet following advice from fellow snooker professional Peter Ebdon, as well as his own research into vegan athletes.

He was an avid gamer, but gave up the hobby in 2017, believing he had a video game addiction and that it was affecting his snooker form. He revealed that he sometimes stayed up all night playing them and was very tired the following day, negatively affecting his snooker practice. Robertson described himself as "two months sober" in April 2017 and explained "I just get too hooked on them."

Robertson plays Warhammer 40,000 and said in an interview in 2024 that he has taken part in tournaments, including the Leeds Grand Tournament the previous year. Robertson has also described that he could spend thirty hours painting a miniature and has also said that he once won an award for best painted army at the London Open. He is also an association football fan, and supports Chelsea. Robertson also enjoys Australian rules football and supports Collingwood.

On 26 January 2025, Robertson was awarded the Medal of the Order of Australia (OAM) for services to snooker.

== Performance and rankings timeline ==
Below is a list of competition results for professional seasons starting from 1999.

Tournament	1998/ 99	1999/ 00	2000/ 01	2001/ 02	2003/ 04	2004/ 05	2005/ 06	2006/ 07	2007/ 08	2008/ 09	2009/ 10	2010/ 11	2011/ 12	2012/ 13	2013/ 14	2014/ 15	2015/ 16	2016/ 17	2017/ 18	2018/ 19	2019/ 20		2020/ 21	2021/ 22	2022/ 23	2023/ 24	2024/ 25	2025/ 26	2026/ 27
Rankings (Note: It shows the ranking at the beginning of the season)	(Note: New players on the Main Tour do not have a ranking)	(Note: He was an amateur)		118		68	28	13	7	10	9	2	5	7	2	3	3	5	7	10	4		3	4	4	6	28	8	2
Ranking tournaments
Championship League	Tournament Not Held								Non-Ranking Event														RR	A	A	WD	WD	A	A
China Open (Note: The event was called the China International (1998/1999))	LQ	A	LQ	LQ	NH	LQ	1R	2R	1R	2R	2R	2R	QF	W	F	1R	1R	A	SF	W	Tournament Not Held								QF
Wuhan Open	Tournament Not Held																									1R	1R	WD	QF
British Open	LQ	A	LQ	LQ	LQ	1R	Tournament Not Held																	A	A	1R	2R	2R	LQ
English Open	Tournament Not Held																	3R	QF	4R	3R		F	W	SF	LQ	W	2R	1R
Shenzhen Open (Note: The event was called the Xi'an Grand Prix (2024/2025–2025/2026))	Tournament Not Held																										1R	2R	2R
Northern Ireland Open	Tournament Not Held																	A	3R	3R	1R		2R	2R	SF	1R	QF	WD	1R
International Championship	Tournament Not Held													F	3R	2R	QF	3R	3R	F	3R		Not Held			1R	2R	3R	2R
UK Championship	LQ	LQ	LQ	1R	LQ	2R	QF	2R	1R	2R	2R	QF	SF	QF	W	4R	W	1R	3R	4R	4R		W	1R	1R	1R	1R	SF	
Shoot Out	Tournament Not Held											Non-ranking Event						A	A	A	A		A	A	A	A	3R	A	
Scottish Open (Note: The event was called the Players Championship (2003/2004))	LQ	A	LQ	LQ	2R	Tournament Not Held								MR	Not Held			4R	W	2R	4R		WD	WD	SF	A	2R	WD	
German Masters	NR	Tournament Not Held										1R	2R	SF	2R	QF	LQ	1R	LQ	QF	F		LQ	1R	2R	3R	QF	SF	
Welsh Open	LQ	A	LQ	LQ	LQ	QF	1R	W	3R	SF	2R	2R	1R	2R	3R	4R	F	2R	2R	W	QF		WD	QF	1R	2R	2R	QF	
World Grand Prix	Tournament Not Held															NR	1R	QF	2R	1R	W		1R	F	1R	DNQ	W	1R	
Players Championship (Note: The event was called the Players Tour Championship Grand Final (2010/2011–2015/2016))	Tournament Not Held											DNQ	F	F	1R	2R	DNQ	QF	QF	F	1R		QF	W	DNQ	DNQ	SF	1R	
World Open (Note: The event was called the Grand Prix (1998/1999–2000/2001 and 2004/2005–2009/2010) and the LG Cup (2001/2002–2003/2004))	LQ	A	LQ	LQ	LQ	3R	1R	W	RR	1R	W	W	2R	SF	3R	Not Held		SF	3R	2R	WD		Not Held			SF	WD	A	
Tour Championship	Tournament Not Held																			F	QF		W	W	DNQ	DNQ	QF	SF	
World Championship	LQ	WD	LQ	LQ	LQ	1R	QF	2R	2R	SF	W	1R	QF	1R	SF	QF	1R	2R	1R	QF	QF		QF	2R	2R	LQ	1R	QF	
Non-ranking tournaments
Shanghai Masters	Tournament Not Held								Ranking Event											2R	SF		Not Held			SF	A	2R	QF
Champion of Champions	Tournament Not Held														SF	SF	W	1R	1R	QF	W		F	QF	1R	A	SF	SF	SF
Riyadh Season Championship	Tournament Not Held																									A	A	F	
The Masters	A	A	LQ	A	WR	A	LQ	QF	1R	QF	1R	QF	W	F	QF	F	QF	QF	A	SF	1R		1R	W	1R	1R	QF	QF	
Championship League	Tournament Not Held								RR	RR	SF	RR	2R	RR	RR	WD	WD	RR	WD	SF	2R	RR	RR	WD	SF	2R	RR	RR	
Former ranking tournaments
Thailand Masters	LQ	A	LQ	LQ	Not Held			NR	Tournament Not Held																				
Irish Masters	Non-Ranking Event				LQ	LQ	NH	NR	Tournament Not Held																				
Northern Ireland Trophy	Tournament Not Held						NR	3R	QF	2R	Tournament Not Held																		
Bahrain Championship	Tournament Not Held									W	Tournament Not Held																		
Wuxi Classic (Note: The event was called the Jiangsu Classic (2008/2009–2009/2010))	Tournament Not Held									Non-Ranking Event				1R	W	W	Tournament Not Held												
Australian Goldfields Open	Tournament Not Held												2R	2R	F	F	1R	Tournament Not Held											
Shanghai Masters	Tournament Not Held								1R	2R	1R	1R	SF	2R	QF	1R	1R	1R	LQ	Non-Ranking			Not Held			Non-Ranking Event			
Indian Open	Tournament Not Held														QF	A	NH	A	WD	WD	Tournament Not Held								
Riga Masters (Note: The event was called the Riga Open (2014/2015–2015/2016))	Tournament Not Held															Minor-Rank		W	1R	W	WD		Tournament Not Held						
China Championship	Tournament Not Held																	NR	1R	2R	2R		Tournament Not Held						
Gibraltar Open	Tournament Not Held																MR	QF	A	A	WD		1R	4R	Tournament Not Held				
WST Classic	Tournament Not Held																								2R	Tournament Not Held			
European Masters (Note: The event was called the Irish Open (1998/1999), the European Open (2001/2002–2003/2004) and the Malta Cup (2004/2005–2007/2008))	LQ	Not Held		LQ	QF	QF	1R	2R	NR	Tournament Not Held								SF	3R	1R	W		QF	2R	A	LQ	Not Held		
Saudi Arabia Masters	Tournament Not Held																										QF	W	NH
Former non-ranking tournaments
Northern Ireland Trophy	Tournament Not Held						SF	Ranking Event			Tournament Not Held																		
Irish Masters	A	A	A	A	Ranking		NH	RR	Tournament Not Held																				
Pot Black	Tournament Not Held						A	A	QF	Tournament Not Held																			
Malta Cup	Not Held			Ranking Event					RR	Tournament Not Held								Ranking Event											
Masters Qualifying Event	A	A	A	A	W	NH	A	A	A	A	Tournament Not Held																		
Hainan Classic	Tournament Not Held											RR	Tournament Not Held																
Wuxi Classic	Tournament Not Held									RR	A	A	A	Ranking Event			Tournament Not Held												
Power Snooker	Tournament Not Held											QF	SF	Tournament Not Held															
Premier League Snooker	A	A	A	A	A	A	A	A	RR	A	RR	SF	RR	SF	Tournament Not Held														
World Grand Prix	Tournament Not Held															2R	Ranking Event												
General Cup (Note: The event was called the General Cup International (2004/2005–2011/2012))	Tournament Not Held					A	Tournament Not Held				A	NH	A	W	F	A	A	Tournament Not Held											
Shoot Out	Tournament Not Held											QF	A	A	A	A	A	Ranking Event											
China Championship	Tournament Not Held																	1R	Ranking Event				Tournament Not Held						
Romanian Masters	Tournament Not Held																		1R	Tournament Not Held									
Hong Kong Masters	Tournament Not Held																		W	Tournament Not Held					SF	Tournament Not Held			
Six-red World Championship (Note: The event was called the Six-red Snooker International (2008/2009) and the Six-red World Grand Prix (2009/2010))	Tournament Not Held									A	A	A	NH	A	F	A	A	A	A	A	A		Not Held		A	Tournament Not Held			

Performance Table Legend
LQ	lost in the qualifying draw	#R	lost in the early rounds of the tournament (WR = Wildcard round, RR = Round robin)	QF	lost in the quarter-finals
SF	lost in the semi-finals	F	lost in the final	W	won the tournament
DNQ	did not qualify for the tournament	A	did not participate in the tournament	WD	withdrew from the tournament

NH / Not Held	means an event was not held.
NR / Non-Ranking Event	means an event is/was no longer a ranking event.
R / Ranking Event	means an event is/was a ranking event.
MR / Minor-Ranking Event	means an event is/was a minor-ranking event.
PA / Pro-am Event	means an event is/was a pro-am event.

== Career finals ==
=== Ranking finals: 39 (26 titles) ===
Legend
World Championship (1–0)
UK Championship (3–0)
Other (22–13)

Outcome	No.	Year	Championship	Opponent in the final	Score	Ref.
Winner	1.	2006	Grand Prix	Jamie Cope (ENG)	9–5	
Winner	2.	2007	Welsh Open	Andrew Higginson (ENG)	9–8	
Winner	3.	2008	Bahrain Championship	Matthew Stevens (WAL)	9–7	
Winner	4.	2009	Grand Prix (2)	Ding Junhui (CHN)	9–4	
Winner	5.	2010	World Championship	Graeme Dott (SCO)	18–13	
Winner	6.	2010	World Open (3)	Ronnie O'Sullivan (ENG)	5–1	
Runner-up	1.	2012	Players Tour Championship Finals	Stephen Lee (ENG)	0–4	
Runner-up	2.	2012	International Championship	Judd Trump (ENG)	8–10	
Runner-up	3.	2013	Players Tour Championship Finals (2)	Ding Junhui (CHN)	3–4	
Winner	7.	2013	China Open	Mark Selby (ENG)	10–6	
Winner	8.	2013	Wuxi Classic	John Higgins (SCO)	10–7	
Runner-up	4.	2013	Australian Goldfields Open	Marco Fu (HKG)	6–9	
Winner	9.	2013	UK Championship	Mark Selby (ENG)	10–7	
Runner-up	5.	2014	China Open	Ding Junhui (CHN)	5–10	
Winner	10.	2014	Wuxi Classic (2)	Joe Perry (ENG)	10–9	
Runner-up	6.	2014	Australian Goldfields Open (2)	Judd Trump (ENG)	5–9	
Winner	11.	2015	UK Championship (2)	Liang Wenbo (CHN)	10–5	
Runner-up	7.	2016	Welsh Open	Ronnie O'Sullivan (ENG)	5–9	
Winner	12.	2016	Riga Masters	Michael Holt (ENG)	5–2	
Winner	13.	2017	Scottish Open	Cao Yupeng (CHN)	9–8	
Winner	14.	2018	Riga Masters (2)	Jack Lisowski (ENG)	5–2	
Runner-up	8.	2018	International Championship (2)	Mark Allen (NIR)	5–10	
Winner	15.	2019	Welsh Open (2)	Stuart Bingham (ENG)	9–7	
Runner-up	9.	2019	Players Championship (3)	Ronnie O'Sullivan (ENG)	4–10	
Runner-up	10.	2019	Tour Championship	Ronnie O'Sullivan (ENG)	11–13	
Winner	16.	2019	China Open (2)	Jack Lisowski (ENG)	11–4	
Winner	17.	2020	European Masters	Zhou Yuelong (CHN)	9–0	
Runner-up	11.	2020	German Masters	Judd Trump (ENG)	6–9	
Winner	18.	2020	World Grand Prix	Graeme Dott (SCO)	10–8	
Runner-up	12.	2020	English Open	Judd Trump (ENG)	8–9	
Winner	19.	2020	UK Championship (3)	Judd Trump (ENG)	10–9	
Winner	20.	2021	Tour Championship	Ronnie O'Sullivan (ENG)	10–4	
Winner	21.	2021	English Open	John Higgins (SCO)	9–8	
Runner-up	13.	2021	World Grand Prix	Ronnie O'Sullivan (ENG)	8–10	
Winner	22.	2022	Players Championship	Barry Hawkins (ENG)	10–5	
Winner	23.	2022	Tour Championship (2)	John Higgins (SCO)	10–9	
Winner	24.	2024	English Open (2)	Wu Yize (CHN)	9–7	
Winner	25.	2025	World Grand Prix (2)	Stuart Bingham (ENG)	10–0	
Winner	26.	2025	Saudi Arabia Snooker Masters	Ronnie O'Sullivan (ENG)	10–9	

=== Minor-ranking finals: 5 (4 titles) ===
Outcome	No.	Year	Championship	Opponent in the final	Score	Ref.
Winner	1.	2011	Warsaw Classic	Ricky Walden (ENG)	4–1	
Winner	2.	2011	Alex Higgins International Trophy	Judd Trump (ENG)	4–1	
Winner	3.	2012	Gdynia Open	Jamie Burnett (SCO)	4–3	
Runner-up	1.	2013	Bulgarian Open	John Higgins (SCO)	1–4	
Winner	4.	2015	Gdynia Open (2)	Mark Williams (WAL)	4–0	

=== Non-ranking finals: 12 (6 titles) ===
Legend
The Masters (2–2)
Champion of Champions (2–1)
Other (2–3)

Outcome	No.	Year	Championship	Opponent in the final	Score	Ref.
Winner	1.	2012	The Masters	Shaun Murphy (ENG)	10–6	
Winner	2.	2012	General Cup	Ricky Walden (ENG)	7–6	
Runner-up	1.	2013	The Masters	Mark Selby (ENG)	6–10	
Runner-up	2.	2013	Six-red World Championship	Mark Davis (ENG)	4–8	
Runner-up	3.	2013	General Cup	Mark Davis (ENG)	2–7	
Runner-up	4.	2015	The Masters (2)	Shaun Murphy (ENG)	2–10	
Winner	3.	2015	Champion of Champions	Mark Allen (NIR)	10–5	
Winner	4.	2017	Hong Kong Masters	Ronnie O'Sullivan (ENG)	6–3	
Winner	5.	2019	Champion of Champions (2)	Judd Trump (ENG)	10–9	
Runner-up	5.	2020	Champion of Champions	Mark Allen (NIR)	6–10	
Winner	6.	2022	The Masters (2)	Barry Hawkins (ENG)	10–4	
Runner-up	6.	2025	Riyadh Season Snooker Championship	Zhao Xintong (CHN)	2–5	

=== Pro-am finals: 2 ===
Outcome	No.	Year	Championship	Opponent in the final	Score
Runner-up	1.	2007	Paul Hunter English Open	Matthew Couch (ENG)	5–6
Runner-up	2.	2010	Austrian Open	Judd Trump (ENG)	4–6

=== Team finals: 2 (2 titles) ===
Outcome	No.	Year	Championship	Team/partner	Opponent in the final	Score
Winner	1.	2008	WLBSA Mixed Doubles Championship	Reanne Evans (ENG)	Joe Perry (ENG); Leah Willett (ENG)	3–1
Winner	2.	2022	World Mixed Doubles	Nutcharut Wongharuthai (THA)	Mark Selby (ENG); Rebecca Kenna (ENG)	4–2

=== Amateur titles ===
Here is a list of non-professional tournaments that Robertson has won during his career.

- Australian U21 Championship – 2000, 2003
- Oceania Championship – 2000
- South Australian Open Championship – 2001
- Victorian Open Championship – 2001, 2002
- Australian Open Championship – 2002
- Fred Osborne Memorial – 2002, 2004
- Lance Pannell Classic – 2002, 2004
- Central Coast Leagues Club Classic – 2003, 2004, 2006, 2007
- IBSF World Under-21 Championship – 2003
- West Coast International – 2004, 2005, 2006, 2007
- Kings Australia Cup – 2006, 2008
- City of Melbourne Championship – 2008, 2009
