= Players Tour Championship 2011/2012 – Event 6 =

Players Tour Championship 2011/2012 Event 6

Tournament information
- Dates: 29 September – 2 October 2011
- Venue: Arena Ursynów
- City: Warsaw
- Country: Poland
- Organisation: World Snooker
- Format: Minor-ranking event
- Total prize fund: €50,000
- Winner's share: €10,000
- Highest break: Alfie Burden (ENG) (143)

Final
- Champion: Neil Robertson (AUS)
- Runner-up: Ricky Walden (ENG)
- Score: 4–1

The Players Tour Championship 2011/2012 – Event 6 (also known as the 2011 Warsaw Classic) was a professional minor-ranking snooker tournament that took place between 29 September – 2 October 2011 at the Arena Ursynów in Warsaw, Poland. This was the first professional snooker tournament held in Poland.

Neil Robertson won his eighth professional title by defeating Ricky Walden 4–1 in the final.

== Prize fund and ranking points ==
The breakdown of prize money and ranking points of the event is shown below:

	Prize fund	Ranking points^{1}
Winner	€10,000	2,000
Runner-up	€5,000	1,600
Semi-finalist	€2,500	1,280
Quarter-finalist	€1,500	1,000
Last 16	€1,000	760
Last 32	€600	560
Last 64	€200	360
Total	€50,000	–

- ^{1} Only professional players can earn ranking points.

== Main draw ==
=== Preliminary rounds ===
==== Round 1 ====
Best of 7 frames

(Belgium) Hans Blanckaert	1–4	(England) Ryan Causton
(Canada) Brent Kolbeck	w/d–w/o	(England) Mitchell Travis
(England) Sydney Wilson	4–0	(England) Oliver Brown

==== Round 2 ====
Best of 7 frames

(Poland) Rafał Górecki	4–1	(Poland) Kamil Zubrzycki
(Poland) Aleksander Zok	1–4	(Ukraine) Vladyslav Vyshnevskyy
(England) Allan Taylor	w/o–w/d	(England) Jonathan Birch
(Pakistan) Najmur Khan	0–4	(Poland) Krzysztof Wróbel
(Poland) Jacek Konarski	0–4	(England) Ryan Causton
(Poland) Piotr Wardowski	0–4	(England) Martin O'Donnell
(Poland) Karol Lelek	2–4	(Poland) Piotr Murat
(England) Sean O'Sullivan	4–1	(Poland) Marcin Nitschke
(Poland) Mateusz Baranowski	1–4	(Poland) Jarosław Kowalski
(Ukraine) Vitaliy Ivaniv	1–4	(England) Mitchell Travis
(Poland) Krzysztof Kubicki	4–0	(Poland) Robert Zabłocki
(Poland) Michał Zieliński	1–4	(China) Chen Zhe
(Poland) Paweł Kasprzycki	0–4	(England) Ashley Wright
(Belgium) Tomasz Skalski	4–1	(Poland) Damian Matysiak
(Poland) Tomasz Gierałtowski	0–4	(India) David Singh
(Wales) Alex Taubman	4–0	(Poland) Daniel Dereziński

(Poland) Paweł Rogoza	1–4	(Poland) Maciej Relich
(Poland) Kevin Dabrowski	0–4	(Poland) Krzysztof Górniak
(Poland) Tomasz Małecki	1–4	(Poland) Michał Ebert
(Thailand) Thanawat Thirapongpaiboon	4–0	(Jordan) Essam Saadeh
(Ukraine) Tetyana Volovelska	0–4	(Poland) Adrian Materek
(England) Michael Wasley	4–2	(England) Sydney Wilson
(Poland) Michał Matuszczyk	0–4	(England) Alex Davies
(Poland) Bartłomiej Orzechowski	2–4	(Poland) Adam Polak
(Poland) Marek Słomianowski	1–4	(Poland) Phan Quoc Binh
(Poland) Karol Szuba-Jabłoński	4–0	(Poland) Michał Łyjak
(England) Liam Monk	3–4	(England) Ian Burns
(England) Ben Harrison	w/d–w/o	(England) Reanne Evans
(England) Shane Castle	4–0	(Poland) Wojciech Bojewski
(Scotland) Mark Owens	0–4	(Poland) Wiktor Doberschütz
(Poland) Adam Stefanow	2–4	(England) Chris Norbury
(England) Phil O’Kane	4–1	(Poland) Rafał Jewtuch

=== Main rounds ===
==== Top half ====
===== Section 1 =====
Last 128; Best of 7 frames
(England) Judd Trump	4
(Poland) Rafał Górecki	0
(England) Mark Joyce	3
(China) Tian Pengfei	4
(Wales) Ryan Day	1
(England) Alfie Burden	4
(Wales) Andrew Pagett	4
(Ukraine) Vladyslav Vyshnevskyy	1
(England) Matthew Selt	4
(England) Allan Taylor	2
(Scotland) Marcus Campbell	4
(Poland) Krzysztof Wróbel	3
(England) Tom Ford	4
(England) Ryan Causton	0
(Norway) Kurt Maflin	3
(Hong Kong) Marco Fu	4

Last 64; Best of 7 frames
(England) Judd Trump	4
(China) Tian Pengfei	3
(England) Alfie Burden	4
(Wales) Andrew Pagett	3
(England) Matthew Selt	4
(Scotland) Marcus Campbell	3
(England) Tom Ford	2
(Hong Kong) Marco Fu	4

Last 32; Best of 7 frames
(England) Judd Trump	4
(England) Alfie Burden	1
(England) Matthew Selt	4
(Hong Kong) Marco Fu	2

Last 16; Best of 7 frames
(England) Judd Trump	4
(England) Matthew Selt	3

===== Section 2 =====
Last 128; Best of 7 frames
(India) Aditya Mehta	2
(China) Cao Yupeng	4
(England) David Gilbert	4
(Poland) Kacper Filipiak	2
(England) Andrew Norman	4
(England) Martin O'Donnell	2
(England) Ricky Walden	4
(England) Mitchell Mann	0
(Malta) Tony Drago	4
(Poland) Grzegorz Biernadski	0
(England) Sam Craigie	2
(England) Matthew Couch	4
(England) Simon Bedford	4
(Poland) Piotr Murat	0
(England) Martin Gould	3
(China) Liu Chuang	4

Last 64; Best of 7 frames
(China) Cao Yupeng	4
(England) David Gilbert	1
(England) Andrew Norman	1
(England) Ricky Walden	4
(Malta) Tony Drago	4
(England) Matthew Couch	1
(England) Simon Bedford	3
(China) Liu Chuang	4

Last 32; Best of 7 frames
(China) Cao Yupeng	0
(England) Ricky Walden	4
(Malta) Tony Drago	1
(China) Liu Chuang	4

Last 16; Best of 7 frames
(England) Ricky Walden	4
(China) Liu Chuang	0

===== Section 3 =====
Last 128; Best of 7 frames
(England) Barry Hawkins	4
(England) Sean O'Sullivan	0
(England) Steve Davis	4
(Poland) Jarosław Kowalski	2
(England) Andy Hicks	2
(England) Mitchell Travis	4
(Scotland) Alan McManus	4
(England) Rod Lawler	2
(England) David Grace	4
(Poland) Krzysztof Kubicki	0
(England) Rory McLeod	3
(China) Chen Zhe	4
(England) Dave Harold	4
(England) Ashley Wright	2
(England) Mark King	4
(England) Barry Pinches	3

Last 64; Best of 7 frames
(England) Barry Hawkins	3
(England) Steve Davis	4
(England) Mitchell Travis	3
(Scotland) Alan McManus	4
(England) David Grace	1
(China) Chen Zhe	4
(England) Dave Harold	1
(England) Mark King	4

Last 32; Best of 7 frames
(England) Steve Davis	4
(Scotland) Alan McManus	2
(China) Chen Zhe	3
(England) Mark King	4

Last 16; Best of 7 frames
(England) Steve Davis	4
(England) Mark King	3

===== Section 4 =====
Last 128; Best of 7 frames
(England) Jack Lisowski	4
(England) Kyren Wilson	2
(England) Stuart Bingham	4
(Belgium) Tomasz Skalski	0
(China) Yu Delu	2
(India) David Singh	4
(England) Gary Wilson	w/o
(Finland) Robin Hull	w/d
(Republic of Ireland) David Morris	w/d
(China) Liang Wenbo	w/o
(Wales) Michael White	4
(Wales) Alex Taubman	0
(England) Mark Davis	4
(Wales) Gareth Allen	3
(England) Nigel Bond	4
(Poland) Maciej Relich	1

Last 64; Best of 7 frames
(England) Jack Lisowski	4
(England) Stuart Bingham	3
(India) David Singh	4
(England) Gary Wilson	3
(China) Liang Wenbo	4
(Wales) Michael White	3
(England) Mark Davis	3
(England) Nigel Bond	4

Last 32; Best of 7 frames
(England) Jack Lisowski	4
(India) David Singh	0
(China) Liang Wenbo	4
(England) Nigel Bond	1

Last 16; Best of 7 frames
(England) Jack Lisowski	4
(China) Liang Wenbo	3

==== Bottom half ====
===== Section 5 =====
Last 128; Best of 7 frames
(Scotland) Graeme Dott	4
(Poland) Krzysztof Górniak	0
(Wales) Jamie Jones	4
(Poland) Michal Ebert	1
(Republic of Ireland) Fergal O'Brien	4
(Thailand) Thanawat Thirapongpaiboon	1
(China) Li Yan	4
(Poland) Adrian Materek	0
(Scotland) Scott MacKenzie	4
(England) Michael Wasley	3
(China) Xiao Guodong	4
(England) Adam Wicheard	0
(Thailand) James Wattana	4
(England) Alex Davies	2
(England) Peter Lines	4
(Poland) Adam Polak	0

Last 64; Best of 7 frames
(Scotland) Graeme Dott	3
(Wales) Jamie Jones	4
(Republic of Ireland) Fergal O'Brien	4
(China) Li Yan	2
(Scotland) Scott MacKenzie	1
(China) Xiao Guodong	4
(Thailand) James Wattana	4
(England) Peter Lines	2

Last 32; Best of 7 frames
(Wales) Jamie Jones	3
(Republic of Ireland) Fergal O'Brien	4
(China) Xiao Guodong	4
(Thailand) James Wattana	3

Last 16; Best of 7 frames
(Republic of Ireland) Fergal O'Brien	3
(China) Xiao Guodong	4

===== Section 6 =====
Last 128; Best of 7 frames
(England) Stephen Lee	4
(Poland) Phan Quoc Binh	0
(England) Andrew Higginson	4
(Poland) Karol Szuba-Jabłoński	0
(England) Sam Baird	3
(England) Ian Burns	4
(Wales) Dominic Dale	2
(England) Stephen Craigie	4
(England) Robbie Williams	3
(Northern Ireland) Joe Swail	4
(Scotland) Anthony McGill	4
(England) Reanne Evans	0
(Thailand) Dechawat Poomjaeng	w/o
(India) Lucky Vatnani	w/d
(Belgium) Luca Brecel	3
(England) Paul Davison	4

Last 64; Best of 7 frames
(England) Stephen Lee	4
(England) Andrew Higginson	1
(England) Ian Burns	2
(England) Stephen Craigie	4
(Northern Ireland) Joe Swail	4
(Scotland) Anthony McGill	1
(Thailand) Dechawat Poomjaeng	3
(England) Paul Davison	4

Last 32; Best of 7 frames
(England) Stephen Lee	4
(England) Stephen Craigie	1
(Northern Ireland) Joe Swail	4
(England) Paul Davison	3

Last 16; Best of 7 frames
(England) Stephen Lee	4
(Northern Ireland) Joe Swail	2

===== Section 7 =====
Last 128; Best of 7 frames
(Australia) Neil Robertson	4
(Wales) Daniel Wells	2
(England) Joe Perry	3
(Northern Ireland) Gerard Greene	4
(England) Mike Dunn	w/d
(China) Liu Song	w/o
(Thailand) Passakorn Suwannawat	2
(England) Peter Ebdon	4
(England) Michael Holt	4
(England) Robert Milkins	1
(England) Jimmy Robertson	4
(England) Shane Castle	1
(Scotland) Stephen Maguire	4
(Republic of Ireland) David Hogan	1
(England) Liam Highfield	0
(England) Anthony Hamilton	4

Last 64; Best of 7 frames
(Australia) Neil Robertson	4
(Northern Ireland) Gerard Greene	3
(China) Liu Song	0
(England) Peter Ebdon	4
(England) Michael Holt	4
(England) Jimmy Robertson	2
(Scotland) Stephen Maguire	4
(England) Anthony Hamilton	3

Last 32; Best of 7 frames
(Australia) Neil Robertson	4
(England) Peter Ebdon	3
(England) Michael Holt	3
(Scotland) Stephen Maguire	4

Last 16; Best of 7 frames
(Australia) Neil Robertson	4
(Scotland) Stephen Maguire	3

===== Section 8 =====
Last 128; Best of 7 frames
(Wales) Jak Jones	2
(England) Shaun Murphy	4
(Wales) Matthew Stevens	1
(England) Stuart Carrington	4
(England) Ali Carter	w/d
(Poland) Wiktor Doberschütz	w/o
(England) Adam Duffy	4
(China) Zhang Anda	3
(England) Craig Steadman	4
(England) Adrian Gunnell	2
(England) Joe Jogia	3
(England) Sam Harvey	4
(England) Jamie Cope	2
(England) Chris Norbury	4
(England) Ben Woollaston	4
(England) Phil O’Kane	2

Last 64; Best of 7 frames
(England) Shaun Murphy	4
(England) Stuart Carrington	3
(Poland) Wiktor Doberschütz	0
(England) Adam Duffy	4
(England) Craig Steadman	4
(England) Sam Harvey	1
(England) Chris Norbury	2
(England) Ben Woollaston	4

Last 32; Best of 7 frames
(England) Shaun Murphy	4
(England) Adam Duffy	1
(England) Craig Steadman	1
(England) Ben Woollaston	4

Last 16; Best of 7 frames
(England) Shaun Murphy	4
(England) Ben Woollaston	2

==== Finals ====
Quarter-finals; Best of 7 frames		Semi-finals; Best of 7 frames		Final; Best of 7 frames
(England) Judd Trump	3
(England) Ricky Walden	4	(England) Ricky Walden	4
(England) Steve Davis	4	(England) Steve Davis	3
(England) Jack Lisowski	2			(England) Ricky Walden	1
(China) Xiao Guodong	3			(Australia) Neil Robertson	4
(England) Stephen Lee	4	(England) Stephen Lee	0
(Australia) Neil Robertson	4	(Australia) Neil Robertson	4
(England) Shaun Murphy	3

== Century breaks ==
- 143 – Alfie Burden
- 141, 115, 110 – Xiao Guodong
- 137 – Tom Ford
- 135, 113, 105 – Judd Trump
- 134 – Jamie Jones
- 131, 103 – Ricky Walden
- 128 – Stuart Bingham
- 128 – Fergal O'Brien
- 125 – David Gilbert
- 124 – Marco Fu
- 123 – Michael Holt
- 114, 113, 103 – Neil Robertson
- 114 – Graeme Dott
- 112 – Michael Wasley
- 109 – Aditya Mehta
- 107 – Dominic Dale
- 107 – Chen Zhe
- 106 – Shaun Murphy
- 104 – Rory McLeod
- 103 – Mark Joyce
- 100 – Mark Davis
- 100 – Paul Davison
- 100 – Kacper Filipiak
- 100 – Joe Perry
