= Jamie Burnett =

Scottish snooker player

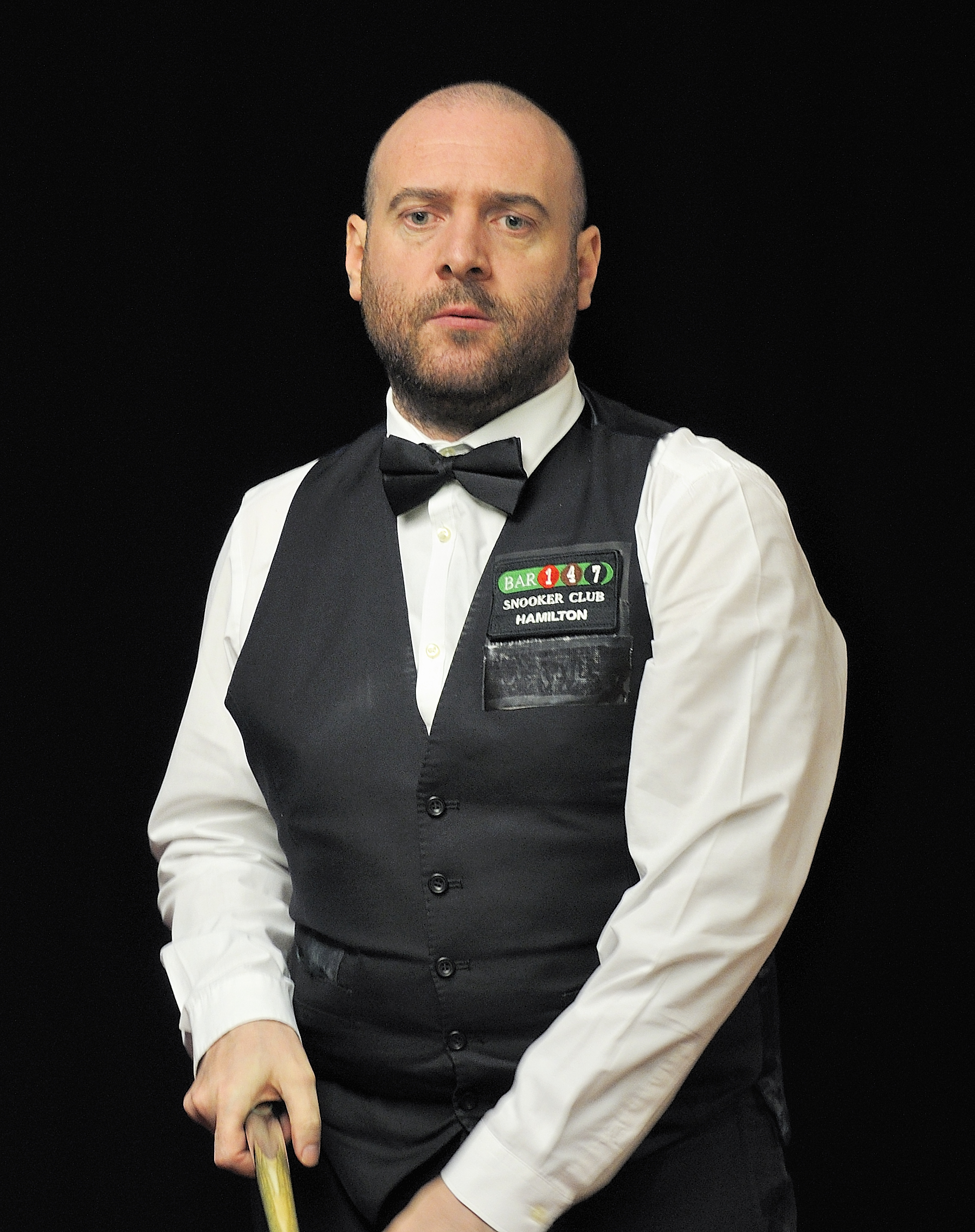
- Burnett at the 2014 German Masters

Personal information
- Born: 16 September 1975 (age 51) Hamilton, South Lanarkshire, Scotland

Sport
- Country: Scotland
- Sport: Snooker
- Professional: 1992–2017
- Highest ranking: 27 (1999/2000)
- Maximum breaks: 1
- Century breaks: 136
- Best ranking finish: Runner-up (x1)

Jamie Burnett (born 16 September 1975) is a Scottish former professional snooker player from Hamilton, South Lanarkshire.

A journeyman, Burnett was ranked within the world's top 64 players for 20 consecutive years between 1996 and 2016, reaching his career best ranking, 27th, in 1999. He appeared in one major final, at the 2010 Shanghai Masters, where he lost 10–7 to Ali Carter, and reached the final of one minor-ranking event, the 2012 Gdynia Open, where Neil Robertson beat him 4–3.

Burnett was the first player to make a break exceeding 147 in professional tournament play, when he made a 16-red clearance of 148 in the 2004 UK Championship qualifiers. This remained the highest break in professional snooker history until the 153 break by Ronnie O'Sullivan at the 2026 World Open.

== Career ==
Burnett made his mark in the 1997 German Open by reaching the quarter finals and equalled his best run the following year in the 1998 Grand Prix. In a 1997–98 season dominated by Stephen Hendry, Burnett claimed two victories over the world number one as well as recorded victories over Stephen Lee and Mark Williams. He made his first appearance in the final stages of the World Championship in 1996, when he led Terry Griffiths 5–0 and 9–5 before losing 9–10 in Griffiths' last victory in the World Championship. In the deciding frame Burnett potted the brown which would have left Griffiths requiring snookers, only for the cue ball to go in-off into the middle pocket, which allowed Griffiths to pot the four remaining colours for victory. Burnett's second appearance did not come until 2009, equalling Barry Pinches' record for the longest gap between Crucible appearances.

During the qualifying stages of the 2004 UK Championship, he was the first player to complete a break of over 147 in a professional match, playing against Leo Fernandez. After being awarded a free ball Burnett took the brown as an extra red, then a brown, then added 15 reds and 12 blacks, two pinks and a blue. He then potted the colours to complete a 148 break. He afterwards commented "I didn't really know how to react afterwards. At first I thought it was no big deal, but then I realised I'd made history." Burnett's 148 held the record for the highest break in professional snooker history until Ronnie O'Sullivan made a break of 153 at the 2026 World Open.

Burnett qualified for the 2008 UK Championship, losing 3–9 to his practice partner Stephen Maguire in the first round. Bookmakers ceased taking bets on the exact scoreline after a surge of bets for that result. In frame 12 Burnett had a chance to make the scoreline 4–8, missing a straightforward final black by so much that BBC analyst John Parrott suggested that an amateur player would be unhappy. The BBC's Clive Everton commented that the circumstances of the final two frames merited investigation. Everton said in commentary "An independent inquiry should be conducted by snooker people with knowledge to appreciate the relative difficulty of shots. The last two frames should be studied particularly closely."

The World Snooker Association decided to investigate the circumstances behind the result, before a formal police investigation was launched, days before Burnett met Maguire in the 2009 World Championship. Following a report from Strathclyde Police, the Crown announced that it had found insufficient evidence to justify a criminal prosecution.

Burnett qualified for the 2010 Shanghai Masters. He started in the wildcard round, and benefited from Ronnie O'Sullivan withdrawal of the main draw to receive a bye to the second round. Burnett then beat Andrew Higginson, Mark Davis (coming back from 0–3 and 1–4), and Jamie Cope en route to his first ranking event final, where he was defeated 7–10 by world number 4 Ali Carter.

Burnett could not qualify for a single ranking tournament during the 2011–12 season. He finished it ranked world number 39 and needed to perform well in the first three tournaments of next season, before he lost the large number of ranking points he gained for reaching the 2010 final in Shanghai.

Burnett did start the new season strongly as he qualified for the first two ranking events, the Wuxi Classic and Australian Goldfields Open. In Wuxi he beat Neil Robertson 5–1 in the first round, before losing to Mark Davis 3–5. In Australia Burnett defeated world number one Mark Selby 5–3, but then exited the tournament in the second round again following a 1–5 defeat to Marco Fu, with Burnett bemoaning a lack of consistency in his game. Despite this he then almost won his first professional title at the minor-ranking Gdynia Open, which formed part of the Players Tour Championship series, by reaching the final where he faced Neil Robertson. He trailed 0–3 in the best of seven frames match, but came back to level the match at 3–3. The decider lasted 52 minutes with Burnett missing a black off its spot with one red left to lose 3–4. However, his run to the final helped him to qualify for the Finals by finishing 12th on the PTC Order of Merit. In the Finals he faced Robertson once more and was beaten again, this time by a 2–4 scoreline. Burnett also qualified for the International Championship, but lost 3–6 to Stephen Maguire in the first round. From December 2012 until the end of the season Burnett could not win another match, culminating in a 6–10 loss to Yu Delu in the third round of World Championship Qualifying. He ended the season where he began it, ranked world number 39.

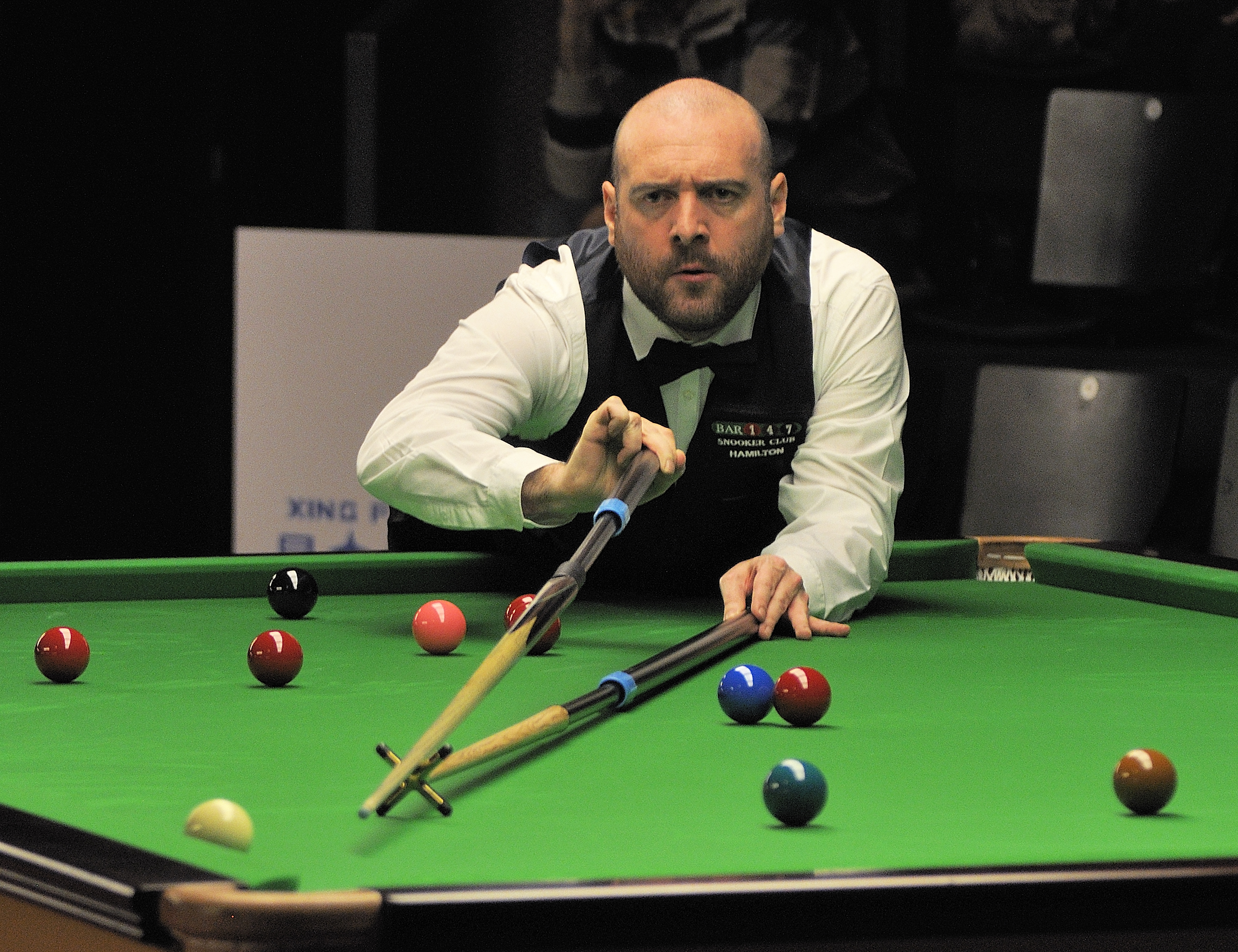
Jamie Burnett at the 2014 German Masters.

Burnett's deepest run in a ranking event in the 2013–14 season was at the German Masters where he beat Ratchayothin Yotharuck 5–2, Joel Walker 5–2, before losing 5–1 to Xiao Guodong in the last 16. He won three matches in World Championship concluding with a 10–8 victory over Ben Woollaston to reach the Crucible for the fourth time. Burnett led Joe Perry 6–3 after the opening session, but was defeated 10–7 and said afterwards that he was not enjoying snooker any more and that it was becoming a chore.

He began the 2014–15 season with a quarter-final showing at the Yixing Open, where he lost 4–2 to Ding Junhui. Burnett overcame Matthew Stevens 6–1 in the first round of the International Championship and then knocked out Judd Trump 6–5. Despite this apparent big win against a top eight player, Burnett did not think he had played well due to needing three or four chances to win each frame. He reached the quarter-finals with a 6–2 victory over Peter Ebdon, but had his mistakes punished by Ricky Walden in a 6–1 thrashing. Burnett could not win a match at a ranking event during the rest of the season. He did win two games in World Championship qualifying, before losing 10–6 to Craig Steadman.

Three qualifying wins saw Burnett play at the 2015 Australian Goldfields Open and he lost 5–3 to Joe Perry in round one. His best run of the 2015–16 season was at the UK Championship, where wins over Sanderson Lam, Alan McManus and Li Hang saw him reach the last 16. Burnett recovered from a 4–1 deficit against John Higgins to level, but would be defeated 6–4. He entered the first three events of the 2016–17 season, but has now not played a professional match since July 2016 and has been relegated from the tour.

== Performance and rankings timeline ==
Tournament	1992/ 93	1993/ 94	1994/ 95	1995/ 96	1996/ 97	1997/ 98	1998/ 99	1999/ 00	2000/ 01	2001/ 02	2002/ 03	2003/ 04	2004/ 05	2005/ 06	2006/ 07	2007/ 08	2008/ 09	2009/ 10	2010/ 11	2011/ 12	2012/ 13	2013/ 14	2014/ 15	2015/ 16	2016/ 17
Ranking (Note: From the 2010/2011 season it shows the ranking at the beginning of the season.)	(Note: New players on the Main Tour don't have a ranking.)	221	105	73	54	38	31	27	33	36	44	46	49	56	54	46	45	40	37	39	39	39	41	46	58
Ranking tournaments
Riga Masters (Note: The event was called the Riga Open (2014/2015–2015/2016))	Tournament Not Held																						Minor-Rank.		LQ
Indian Open	Tournament Not Held																					1R	1R	NH	1R
World Open (Note: The event was called the Grand Prix (1992/1993–2000/2001 and 2004/2005–2009/2010), the LG Cup (2001/2002–2003/2004) and the Haikou World Open (2011/2012–2013/2014))	LQ	LQ	2R	LQ	1R	2R	QF	1R	1R	LQ	1R	LQ	1R	LQ	LQ	LQ	1R	1R	LQ	LQ	LQ	LQ	Not Held		WD
Shanghai Masters	Tournament Not Held															LQ	LQ	LQ	F	LQ	LQ	LQ	LQ	LQ	A
European Masters (Note: The event was called the Irish Open (1998/1999) and Malta Cup (2004/2005–2007/2008))	LQ	LQ	LQ	LQ	1R	NH	LQ	Not Held		1R	1R	LQ	1R	LQ	LQ	NR	Tournament Not Held								A
International Championship	Tournament Not Held																				1R	1R	QF	1R	A
UK Championship	LQ	1R	2R	1R	1R	2R	1R	2R	LQ	1R	LQ	LQ	LQ	2R	2R	LQ	1R	LQ	LQ	LQ	LQ	3R	LQ	4R	A
Scottish Open (Note: The event was called the International Open (1992/1993–1996/1997) and the Players Championship (2003/2004))	1R	2R	LQ	LQ	1R	1R	3R	1R	1R	LQ	LQ	3R	Tournament Not Held								MR	Not Held			A
German Masters (Note: The event was called the German Open (1995/1996–1997/1998))	Not Held			LQ	1R	QF	NR	Tournament Not Held											LQ	LQ	1R	3R	WD	LQ	A
Welsh Open	LQ	1R	LQ	LQ	2R	QF	1R	1R	1R	2R	1R	LQ	LQ	LQ	3R	LQ	1R	LQ	1R	LQ	LQ	2R	1R	WD	A
Players Championship (Note: The event was called the Players Tour Championship Grand Finals (2010/2011–2012/2013) and the Players Championship Grand Final (2013/2014–2015/2016))	Tournament Not Held																		DNQ	DNQ	1R	DNQ	DNQ	DNQ	DNQ
China Open (Note: The event was called the China International (1998/1999))	Tournament Not Held					NR	1R	1R	LQ	LQ	Not Held		LQ	LQ	LQ	LQ	LQ	LQ	LQ	LQ	LQ	LQ	1R	LQ	A
World Championship	LQ	LQ	LQ	1R	LQ	LQ	LQ	LQ	LQ	LQ	LQ	LQ	LQ	LQ	LQ	LQ	1R	LQ	1R	LQ	LQ	1R	LQ	LQ	A
Non-ranking tournaments
The Masters	LQ	LQ	LQ	LQ	LQ	A	LQ	LQ	LQ	LQ	LQ	LQ	A	A	LQ	LQ	A	LQ	A	A	A	A	A	A	A
World Seniors Championship	Tournament Not Held																		A	A	A	A	A	LQ	A
Former ranking tournaments
Dubai Classic (Note: The event was called the Thailand Classic (1995/1996) and the Asian Classic (1996/1997))	LQ	LQ	LQ	LQ	LQ	Tournament Not Held																			
Malta Grand Prix	Not Held		Non-Ranking Event					LQ	NR	Tournament Not Held															
Thailand Masters (Note: The event was called the Asian Open (1992/1993) and the Thailand Open (1993/1994–1996/1997))	LQ	LQ	LQ	1R	LQ	LQ	1R	LQ	LQ	LQ	NR	Not Held			NR	Tournament Not Held									
British Open	LQ	LQ	LQ	1R	LQ	1R	1R	2R	LQ	LQ	LQ	LQ	1R	Tournament Not Held											
Irish Masters	Non-Ranking Event										2R	1R	LQ	NH	NR	Tournament Not Held									
Northern Ireland Trophy	Tournament Not Held													NR	2R	1R	LQ	Tournament Not Held							
Bahrain Championship	Tournament Not Held																LQ	Tournament Not Held							
Wuxi Classic	Tournament Not Held																Non-Ranking Event				2R	1R	1R	Not Held	
Australian Goldfields Open	Not Held		NR		Tournament Not Held															LQ	2R	LQ	LQ	1R	NH
Former non-ranking tournaments
Scottish Masters	A	A	A	A	A	A	LQ	LQ	A	A	A	Tournament Not Held													
Scottish Professional Championship	Tournament Not Held																		QF	Tournament Not Held					
Shoot-Out	Tournament Not Held																		1R	1R	1R	3R	1R	A	R

Performance Table Legend
LQ	lost in the qualifying draw	#R	lost in the early rounds of the tournament (WR = Wildcard round, RR = Round robin)	QF	lost in the quarter-finals
SF	lost in the semi-finals	F	lost in the final	W	won the tournament
DNQ	did not qualify for the tournament	A	did not participate in the tournament	WD	withdrew from the tournament
DQ	disqualified from the tournament				

NH / Not Held	event was not held.
NR / Non-Ranking Event	event is/was no longer a ranking event.
R / Ranking Event	event is/was a ranking event.
MR / Minor-Ranking Event	means an event is/was a minor-ranking event.
PA / Pro-am Event	means an event is/was a pro-am event.

== Career finals ==
=== Ranking finals: 1 ===
Outcome	No.	Year	Championship	Opponent in the final	Score
Runner-up	1.	2010	Shanghai Masters	(England) Ali Carter	7–10

=== Minor-ranking finals: 1 ===
Outcome	No.	Year	Championship	Opponent in the final	Score
Runner-up	1.	2012	Gdynia Open	(Australia) Neil Robertson	3–4

=== Amateur finals: 4 (3 titles) ===
Outcome	No.	Year	Championship	Opponent in the final	Score
Winner	1.	1989	Scottish Under-16 Championship	(Scotland) Paul Gow	4–0
Winner	2.	1990	UK Under-15 Championship	(Wales) Matthew Stevens	3–1
Runner-up	1.	1990	Scottish Under-16 Championship	(Scotland) John Higgins	2–5
Winner	3.	1992	Scottish Amateur Championship	(Scotland) Martin Dziewialtowski	6–2
