= 2013 German Masters =

2013 Betfair German Masters

Tournament information
- Dates: 30 January – 3 February 2013
- Venue: Tempodrom
- City: Berlin
- Country: Germany
- Organisation: World Snooker
- Format: Ranking event
- Total prize fund: €300,000
- Winner's share: €60,000
- Highest break: Michael Holt (ENG) (144)

Final
- Champion: Ali Carter (ENG)
- Runner-up: Marco Fu (HKG)
- Score: 9–6

The 2013 German Masters (officially the 2013 Betfair German Masters) was a professional ranking snooker tournament that took place between 30 January – 3 February 2013 at the Tempodrom in Berlin, Germany. It was the sixth ranking event of the 2012/2013 season.

Ronnie O'Sullivan was the defending champion, but he decided not to compete this year.

Ali Carter won his third ranking title by defeating Marco Fu 9–6 in the final.

== Prize fund ==
The breakdown of prize money for this year is shown below:

- Winner: €60,000
- Runner-up: €32,000
- Semi-final: €16,000
- Quarter-final: €9,000
- Last 16: €4,500
- Last 32: €2,750
- Last 64: €1,500
- Non-televised highest break: €0
- Televised highest break: €2,000
- Total: €300,000

== Main draw ==
Last 32; Best of 9 frames
Judd Trump (ENG)	4
Anthony Hamilton (ENG)	5
Fraser Patrick (SCO)	3
Ali Carter (ENG)	5
Xiao Guodong (CHN)	4
Kurt Maflin (NOR)	5
Michael Holt (ENG)	5
Mark Williams (WAL)	1
Neil Robertson (AUS)	5
Michael Wasley (ENG)	1
Andrew Higginson (ENG)	5
Stuart Bingham (ENG)	1
Graeme Dott (SCO)	5
Dave Harold (ENG)	3
Robert Milkins (ENG)	3
Shaun Murphy (ENG)	5
Peter Lines (ENG)	5
Ken Doherty (IRL)	3
Marco Fu (HKG)	5
Ricky Walden (ENG)	3
Matthew Stevens (WAL)	5
Jamie Burnett (SCO)	1
Mark King (ENG)	5
Stephen Maguire (SCO)	0
Mark Allen (NIR)	5
Dominic Dale (WAL)	2
Dechawat Poomjaeng (THA)	2
Barry Hawkins (ENG)	5
Ding Junhui (CHN)	5
Marcus Campbell (SCO)	0
Joe Perry (ENG)	2
Mark Selby (ENG)	5

Last 16; Best of 9 frames
(England) Anthony Hamilton	2
(England) Ali Carter	5
(Norway) Kurt Maflin	3
(England) Michael Holt	5
(Australia) Neil Robertson	5
(England) Andrew Higginson	1
(Scotland) Graeme Dott	4
(England) Shaun Murphy	5
(England) Peter Lines	3
(Hong Kong) Marco Fu	5
(Wales) Matthew Stevens	5
(England) Mark King	4
(Northern Ireland) Mark Allen	1
(England) Barry Hawkins	5
(China) Ding Junhui	3
(England) Mark Selby	5

Quarter-finals; Best of 9 frames
(England) Ali Carter	5
(England) Michael Holt	2
(Australia) Neil Robertson	5
(England) Shaun Murphy	4
(Hong Kong) Marco Fu	5
(Wales) Matthew Stevens	3
(England) Barry Hawkins	5
(England) Mark Selby	1

Semi-finals; Best of 11 frames
(England) Ali Carter	6
(Australia) Neil Robertson	2
(Hong Kong) Marco Fu	6
(England) Barry Hawkins	4

Final; Best of 17 frames
(England) Ali Carter	9
(Hong Kong) Marco Fu	6

== Final ==
Final: Best of 17 frames. Referee: Olivier Marteel. Tempodrom, Berlin, Germany, 3 February 2013.
Ali Carter; England	9–6	Marco Fu; Hong Kong
Afternoon: 54–71, 11–67 (55), 75–0 (55), 0–104 (104), 80–0 (70), 68–39, 0–87 (83), 30–64; Evening: 117–4 (116), 128–0 (121), 67–0, 30–69, 103–31 (71), 78–4, 61–1
121	Highest break	104
2	Century breaks	1
5	50+ breaks	3

== Qualifying ==
Qualifying matches were held between 28 and 30 November 2012 at the World Snooker Academy in Sheffield, England. 10 matches from the second qualifying round, were held over and played on 30 January 2013 at the Tempodrom in Berlin, Germany. Matches were over 9 frames.

=== Round 1 ===
James Wattana (THA)	5–2	Li Yan (CHN)
Anthony Hamilton (ENG)	5–2	Ian Burns (ENG)
Michael White (WAL)	2–5	Fraser Patrick (SCO)
Rory McLeod (ENG)	5–0	Jordan Brown (NIR)
Xiao Guodong (CHN)	5–4	Jamie O'Neill (ENG)
Kurt Maflin (NOR)	5–0	Joel Walker (ENG)
Anthony McGill (SCO)	4–5	Tian Pengfei (CHN)
Gerard Greene (NIR)	3–5	Martin O'Donnell (ENG)
Jimmy Robertson (ENG)	3–5	Daniel Wells (WAL)
Jack Lisowski (ENG)	1–5	Michael Wasley (ENG)
Aditya Mehta (IND)	2–5	Zhang Anda (CHN)
Rod Lawler (ENG)	5–2	Liam Highfield (ENG)
Liang Wenbo (CHN)	5–1	Paul Davison (ENG)
Dave Harold (ENG)	5–3	Craig Steadman (ENG)
David Gilbert (ENG)	3–5	Chen Zhe (CHN)
Ben Woollaston (ENG)	5–0	Ben Judge (AUS)

Peter Lines (ENG)	5–1	Passakorn Suwannawat (THA)
Adam Duffy (ENG)	5–3	David Grace (ENG)
Matthew Selt (ENG)	5–3	Robbie Williams (ENG)
Alfred Burden (ENG)	5–3	Sean O'Sullivan (ENG)
Mike Dunn (ENG)	1–5	Pankaj Advani (IND)
Mark Joyce (ENG)	5–1	Thanawat Thirapongpaiboon (THA)
Barry Pinches (ENG)	5–4	Luca Brecel (BEL)
Alan McManus (SCO)	5–4	Tony Drago (MLT)
Nigel Bond (ENG)	5–1	Scott Donaldson (SCO)
Jimmy White (ENG)	w/o–w/d	Mohamed Khairy (EGY)
Yu Delu (CHN)	1–5	Dechawat Poomjaeng (THA)
Andy Hicks (ENG)	3–5	Sam Baird (ENG)
Liu Chuang (CHN)	5–1	Adrian Gunnell (ENG)
Jamie Jones (WAL)	5–3	Michael Leslie (SCO)
Steve Davis (ENG)	4–5	Simon Bedford (ENG)
Cao Yupeng (CHN)	1–5	Thepchaiya Un-Nooh (THA)

=== Round 2 ===
Judd Trump (ENG) (Note: Matches were held over and played in Berlin.)	5–4	(Thailand) James Wattana
Jamie Cope (ENG)	0–5	(England) Anthony Hamilton
Martin Gould (ENG)	1–5	(Scotland) Fraser Patrick
Ali Carter (ENG)	5–0	(England) Rory McLeod
Mark Davis (ENG)	2–5	(China) Xiao Guodong
Tom Ford (ENG)	1–5	(Norway) Kurt Maflin
Michael Holt (ENG)	5–1	(China) Tian Pengfei
Mark Williams (WAL)	5–1	(England) Martin O'Donnell
Neil Robertson (AUS)	5–0	(Wales) Daniel Wells
Peter Ebdon (ENG)	3–5	(England) Michael Wasley
Andrew Higginson (ENG)	5–4	(China) Zhang Anda
Stuart Bingham (ENG)	5–1	(England) Rod Lawler
Graeme Dott (SCO)	5–3	(China) Liang Wenbo
Ryan Day (WAL)	4–5	(England) Dave Harold
Robert Milkins (ENG)	5–4	(China) Chen Zhe
Shaun Murphy (ENG)	5–1	(England) Ben Woollaston

John Higgins (SCO)	3–5	(England) Peter Lines
Ken Doherty (IRL)	5–4	(England) Adam Duffy
Marco Fu (HKG)	5–4	(England) Matthew Selt
Ricky Walden (ENG)	5–3	(England) Alfred Burden
Matthew Stevens (WAL)	5–3	(India) Pankaj Advani
Jamie Burnett (SCO)	5–4	(England) Mark Joyce
Mark King (ENG)	5–3	(England) Barry Pinches
Stephen Maguire (SCO)	5–3	(Scotland) Alan McManus
Mark Allen (NIR)	5–2	(England) Nigel Bond
Dominic Dale (WAL)	5–3	(England) Jimmy White
Fergal O'Brien (IRL)	2–5	(Thailand) Dechawat Poomjaeng
Barry Hawkins (ENG)	5–0	(England) Sam Baird
Ding Junhui (CHN)	5–4	(China) Liu Chuang
Marcus Campbell (SCO)	5–3	(Wales) Jamie Jones
Joe Perry (ENG)	5–0	(England) Simon Bedford
Mark Selby (ENG)	5–2	(Thailand) Thepchaiya Un-Nooh

== Century breaks ==
- 144, 122 – Michael Holt
- 142, 127, 115 – Kurt Maflin
- 142, 126, 110, 108, 104, 100 – Marco Fu
- 141, 130 – Liang Wenbo
- 141, 106 – Judd Trump
- 141 – Neil Robertson
- 140 – Robert Milkins
- 135 – Matthew Selt
- 134, 114 – Ding Junhui
- 133, 127, 116, 107 – Shaun Murphy
- 132, 130, 122, 106, 102 – Barry Hawkins
- 131 – Graeme Dott
- 130 – Xiao Guodong
- 129 – Thepchaiya Un-Nooh
- 128, 102 – Joe Perry
- 128 – Adam Duffy
- 123, 114, 104 – Mark Selby
- 121, 116 – Ali Carter
- 121, 102 – Dave Harold
- 120 – Mark Joyce
- 119 – Ricky Walden
- 116 – Fergal O'Brien
- 112 – James Wattana
- 107 – Jamie Jones
- 105 – Stuart Bingham
- 105 – Mark King
- 103 – Pankaj Advani
- 102 – Rod Lawler
- 101 – Thanawat Thirapongpaiboon
- 101 – Matthew Stevens
- 100 – Gerard Greene
- 100 – Luca Brecel
- 100 – Fraser Patrick
- 100 – Mark Allen
