= Ben Judge =

Australian snooker player (born 1983)

Personal information
- Born: 18 September 1983 (age 43) Perth, Western Australia, Australia

Sport
- Country: Australia
- Sport: Snooker
- Professional: 2012/2013
- Highest ranking: 83 (July 2012)

Ben Judge (born 18 September 1983) is a former Australian professional snooker player from Perth.

== Snooker career ==
Judge, as an amateur played in a pre-qualifying match for the 2000 World Snooker Championship losing 5–3 to Atthasit Mahitthi. In 2011, Judge attempted the qualify for the World Snooker Tour via the Q School but was unsuccessful. A year later, Judge won a place on the professional tour for the 2012–13 and 2013–14 seasons after winning the 2012 Oceania Championship, 6–2 over James Mifsud. He had two wins, one against Sam Baird in the Last 96 stage of the 2012 Shanghai Masters qualifiers and the other against Alan McManus in the 2012 Gdynia Open Last 128 stage. He last played in the qualifiers for the 2013 German Masters in November 2012 and resigned from the tour in November 2013.

Judge won two group matches at the 2014 Six-red World Championship to qualify for the last 32, where Stephen Maguire beat him 6–4. He was eliminated in the group stage a year later and was defeated in the wildcard of the 2015 Australian Goldfields Open by Matthew Selt.

== Performance and rankings timeline ==
Tournament	1999/ 00	2012/ 13	2014/ 15
Ranking (Note: It shows the ranking at the beginning of the season.)	(Note: He was an amateur.)	(Note: New players don't have a ranking.)	
Ranking Tournaments
Wuxi Classic	NH	LQ	A
Australian Goldfields Open	NH	LQ	A
Shanghai Masters	NH	LQ	A
International Championship	NH	LQ	A
UK Championship	A	LQ	A
German Masters	NH	LQ	A
Players Tour Championship Finals	NH	DNQ	A
World Championship	LQ	A	A
Non-Ranking Tournaments
Six-red World Championship	NH	RR	2R

Performance Table Legend
LQ	lost in the qualifying draw	#R	lost in the early rounds of the tournament (WR = Wildcard round, RR = Round robin)	QF	lost in the quarter-finals
SF	lost in the semi-finals	F	lost in the final	W	won the tournament
DNQ	did not qualify for the tournament	A	did not participate in the tournament	WD	withdrew from the tournament

NH / Not Held	means an event was not held.
NR / Non-Ranking Event	means an event is/was no longer a ranking event.
R / Ranking Event	means an event is/was a ranking event.
MR / Minor-Ranking Event	means an event is/was a minor-ranking event.

== Notes ==
A. Judge resigned from the tour in November 2013, halfway through the 2013–14 season.
