= 2010 Power Snooker Masters Trophy =

Cue sports tournament

2010 Power Snooker
Tournament information
- Dates: 30 October 2010
- Venue: The O2
- City: London
- Country: United Kingdom
- Organisation: Power Snooker Group
- Format: Power Snooker
- Winner's share: £35,000

Final
- Champion: (England) Ronnie O'Sullivan
- Runner-up: (China) Ding Junhui
- Score: 572–258 points (Unlimited Racks)

The 2010 Power Snooker was a cue sports tournament. The inaugural event took place on the 30 October 2010 at The O2, London, United Kingdom. Ronnie O'Sullivan defeated Ding Junhui 572–258 on points in a 30-minute time based unlimited racks final.

== Venue, entrants and prize money ==
Power Snooker's inaugural tournament was a one-day event hosted at The O2 in London, held on 30 October 2010. Each match lasted a total of 30 minutes with the balls constantly being reracked at the end of each rack until the 30 minutes was up. Two thousand spectators watched the eight hours of tournament play in the indigO2 sub-venue. The players in the inaugural tournament competed for a £35,000 first prize.

O'Sullivan was the first player to be confirmed as participating in the inaugural tournament, which was announced during the official launch. It was stated during the launch that the inaugural tournament would feature the four top ranked players in the world, alongside four wild card entrants. The other seven entrants were confirmed on 24 September, matching the players who were mooted by the organisers during the launch as possible entrants. The tournament draw took place on 12 October, with O'Sullivan facing Brecel in the opening game.

== Draw ==
Play occurred over two sessions in a knock-out format. The first round of eight games took place in an afternoon session, producing four semi-finalists. The semi-finals, third place play off and final then took place in an evening session.

First Round; 30 Minute Matches, Unlimited Racks
(England) Ronnie O'Sullivan	338
(Belgium) Luca Brecel	196
(England) Mark Selby	206
(England) Ali Carter	222
(China) Ding Junhui	311
(England) Jimmy White	246
(Australia) Neil Robertson	274
(England) Shaun Murphy	311

Semi-finals; 30 Minute Matches, Unlimited Racks
(England) Ronnie O'Sullivan	490
(England) Ali Carter	234
(China) Ding Junhui	263
(England) Shaun Murphy	132

Final; 30 Minute Match, Unlimited Racks
(England) Ronnie O'Sullivan	572
(China) Ding Junhui	258
Third Place 30 Minute Match, Unlimited Racks
(England) Ali Carter	299
(England) Shaun Murphy	102

== Match referees ==
The tournament was refereed by two female professional cue-sport referees, Michaela Tabb from Scotland and Patricia Murphy from Ireland. Tabb was head-referee at most Matchroom Sport pool events (including the World Pool Championship and Mosconi Cup), and the first woman to referee a world ranking match and, in 2009, a World Snooker Championship final; while Murphy began refereeing professional snooker matches at the 2005 UK Championships.

Tabb said on the eve of the tournament that "Power Snooker is an entirely new game with a totally new set of rules and will provide many exciting challenges to both the referees and the players. The game will be played at a faster pace than the traditional game, it's going to be very exciting to watch", while Murphy said "It'll be great to see how the audience react and join in with the action".

== Broadcast ==
The 2010 tournament was broadcast live in the United Kingdom on ITV4 for the whole eight hours of play. Talksport provided radio coverage. In addition to ITV4, the tournament was broadcast to 25 other countries in Europe, the Middle East, the Far East, China, Latin America and Oceana.
