= Jade by Monica & Karishma =

JADE by Monica and Karishma
- Type: Private
- Industry: Fashion
- Founded: 2008
- Founders: Monica Shah and Karishma Swali
- Headquarters: Mumbai, Maharashtra, India
- Products: Bridal couture, ready-to-wear, accessories, menswear
- Website: www.jadebymk.com

JADE by Monica & Karishma is an Indian fashion label founded in 2008 in Mumbai by sisters-in-law Monica Shah and Karishma Swali. The label designs bridal and occasion wear for women and men using traditional Indian handcraft techniques. It operates retail stores in Mumbai, Delhi, Hyderabad, Ahmedabad and Bangalore, and sells its products through its website.

In 2023, the company launched the Grassroot Artisans Project (GAP), an initiative founded by Monica Shah.

== Founders ==
Monica Shah completed a summer course at Central Saint Martins in London, while Karishma Swali studied fashion design at the National Institute of Fashion Technology (NIFT) in India. Both worked with Italian fashion houses before co-founding JADE by Monica & Karishma. Shah and Swali are sisters-in-law.

== History ==
JADE by Monica & Karishma was established in 2008 in Mumbai, initially operating out of Chanakya International, an export textile enterprise. The label focused initially on couture design, drawing from the founders' previous experience working with European fashion houses. The label made its runway debut at Lakmé Fashion Week Summer/Resort 2014 in Mumbai held at the Grand Hyatt Mumbai. The debut collection incorporated global and regional textile techniques, including French knots, Japanese beads, and traditional Indian Ek Taar and Kasab embroidery. Following the showcase, the label opened a concept store in New Delhi.

In January 2016, the label designed costumes inspired by the film Wazir, marking one of its earliest formal collaborations with the Indian film industry. The label expanded its retail operations internationally in April 2021 by opening a by-appointment flagship studio in Los Angeles, California. The following year, the label designed the custom wedding attire for actors Nayanthara and Vignesh Shivan for their ceremony in Mahabalipuram.

In September 2023, the company expanded its retail footprint by opening twin flagship boutiques for menswear and bridal couture in Mehrauli, New Delhi. The retail spaces featured regional crafts and textiles commissioned from artisans in Barmer and Bhuj. In December 2023, the label launched the Grassroot Artisans Project, a collaborative initiative with craft communities across Rajasthan, Gujarat, Tamil Nadu, and Punjab, alongside an educational partnership with Istituto Marangoni Mumbai. By 2026, JADE by Monica & Karishma operated five retail stores in Mumbai, Hyderabad, Ahmedabad, New Delhi and Bangalore.

The label presented its Legacy of Deft Hands couture collection in May 2024 at the Chhatrapati Shivaji Maharaj Vastu Sangrahalaya in Mumbai, utilizing design elements inspired by the museum's Indian Textiles and Costume Gallery. In 2025, as part of the ongoing Grassroot Artisans Project, the label collaborated with the Pochampally-based weaving collective Shreeranjan Weaves to integrate Pochampally ikat textiles into its seasonal garments.

Between 2025 and 2026, the label's designs were featured at international cultural and red-carpet events, including garments worn by actresses Nitanshi Goel and Aditi Rao Hydari at the Cannes Film Festival, as well as Deepika Padukone in Dubai. In 2026, the label reintroduced historical Mughal-era kasab-zari embroidery techniques for its bridal line in coordination with master artisans at Chanakya.

== Vegan accessories and PETA collaboration ==
In 2022, the label registered its accessories line with PETA India's "PETA-Approved Vegan" certification program, committing to exclude leather, silk, wool, and other animal-derived materials from the collection. The initial vegan accessories range included 18-karat gold-plated meenakari enamel bags and 92.5% silver-plated coin purses produced by traditional artisans in Rajasthan.

== Notable clients ==
The label's designs have been worn by Indian actors and public figures including Deepika Padukone, Priyanka Chopra Jonas, Aditi Rao Hydari, Nayanthara, Rashmika Mandanna, Vijay Deverakonda and others.
