= 2006 Northern Ireland Trophy =

Northern Ireland Trophy
Tournament information
- Dates: 13–20 August 2006
- Venue: Waterfront Hall
- City: Belfast
- Country: Northern Ireland
- Organisation: World Professional Billiards and Snooker Association
- Format: Ranking event
- Total prize fund: £200,500
- Winner's share: £30,000
- Highest break: Ronnie O'Sullivan (ENG) (140)

Final
- Champion: Ding Junhui (CHN)
- Runner-up: Ronnie O'Sullivan (ENG)
- Score: 9–6

The 2006 Northern Ireland Trophy was the 2006 edition of the Northern Ireland Trophy snooker tournament, held from 13 to 20 August 2006, at the Waterfront Hall, Belfast, Northern Ireland. Ding Junhui defeated Ronnie O'Sullivan by nine frames to six (9–6) in the final to lift his third ranking title whilst still a teenager. In the semi-finals, Ding defeated Stephen Lee 6–1, and O'Sullivan beat Dominic Dale 6–0. O'Sullivan made the highest break with his 140. The defending champion, Matthew Stevens, lost in round 3. The tournament, consisting of the top 32 and 16 qualifiers, was the first of seven WPBSA ranking events in the 2006/2007 season, preceding the Grand Prix.

== Tournament summary ==
The Northern Ireland Trophy was first staged in 2005 at the Waterfront Hall, Belfast, Northern Ireland, as a non-ranking tournament featuring the top 16 and four wildcards, generally Irish. In the following year, it was granted ranking status and took the form of a regular tournament.

The 2006 tournament was the first of seven World Professional Billiards and Snooker Association (WPBSA) ranking events in the 2006/2007 season, preceding the Grand Prix, and the first event since last season's World Championship won by Graeme Dott, who defeated Peter Ebdon 18–14 in the final. The defending champion was Matthew Stevens, who defeated Stephen Hendry 9–7 in the previous year's final. Going into the tournament, Joe Swail, provisionally ranked number 13, said he was targeting a place in the top 16; and Dott, the World Champion, said interest in his results would increase, and that he felt capable of winning more tournaments. Shaun Murphy, the 2005 World Champion, said the pressure would be off him in the 2006/2007 season.

=== Qualifying ===
The qualifying stage took place between players ranked from 33 to 48 and those lower for one of 16 places in the final stage between 29 and 31 July 2006 at Pontin's Snooker Centre, Prestatyn, Wales. The matches were best-of-9 frames until the semi-finals. Successful qualifiers in this round included Northern Irish player Mark Allen, who defeated Tom Ford 5–3, and said the Waterfront—where he made his professional debut last year—was the best venue he had played at. Gerard Greene defeated Judd Trump 5–2, and Dominic Dale beat Dermot McGlinchey 5–1. Jimmy White, who had slipped from 8th to 35th in the rankings, lost 3–5 to Jimmy Michie, and said he was "match-shy" rather than nervous. Irish players Joe Delaney and Fergal O'Brien lost to Rod Lawler and Paul Davies respectively, both 3–5.

=== Round 1 ===
In round 1 the 16 qualifiers went through to face players ranked 17–32. Swail lost 1–5 to Greene, who said the crowd was on his opponent's side. Tied at 3–3 Mark Selby won the seventh frame after Tony Drago missed a pink, eventually winning the match 5–4. Jamie Burnett made breaks of 117, 77, and 55 in defeating David Gray 5–2. Allen lost 1–5 to Ryan Day, a match in which Day made breaks of 79, 73, 56, and 91, after which Day said, "as soon as I started knocking in some breaks they went a bit quiet", in reference to the crowd. Michael Holt lost 2–5 to Mike Dunn, a player ranked 34 places below him. James Wattana defeated Michie 5–4 in a match that lasted over three hours. Michie was 1–3 down but went on to lead 4–3 and 30–0 points before he missed a straightforward pot, eventually losing the frame. Michie had the first chance in the next but also lost that frame. Tian Pengfei, on his 19th birthday, made breaks of 50, 62, and 115 in defeating Andy Hicks.

=== Final ===
In the best-of-17 final Ding defeated O'Sullivan to lift his third ranking title whilst still a teenager.

== Prize fund ==
The breakdown of prize money for this year is shown below:

- Winner: £30,000
- Final: £15,000
- Semi-final: £7,500
- Quarter-final: £5,600
- Last 16: £4,000
- Last 32: £2,500
- Last 48: £1,625
- Last 64: £1,100
- Stage one highest break: £500
- Stage two highest break: £2,000
- Stage one maximum break: £1,000
- Stage two maximum break: £20,000
- Total: £200,500

== Main draw ==
Last 48; Best of 9 frames
22	(England) David Gray	2
(Scotland) Jamie Burnett	5
27	(England) Mark Selby	5
(Malta) Tony Drago	4
29	(Northern Ireland) Joe Swail	1
(Northern Ireland) Gerard Greene	5
21	(Hong Kong) Marco Fu	3
(Wales) Dominic Dale	5
18	(England) Joe Perry	4
(England) Andrew Norman	5
17	(Wales) Ryan Day	5
(Northern Ireland) Mark Allen	1
28	(England) Mark King	5
(England) Rory McLeod	3
19	(Scotland) Alan McManus	2
(England) Stuart Pettman	5
24	(Thailand) James Wattana	5
(England) Jimmy Michie	4
20	(England) Michael Holt	2
(England) Mike Dunn	5
26	(China) Ding Junhui	5
(Wales) Paul Davies	4
32	(England) Robert Milkins	5
(England) Rod Lawler	2
30	(England) Andy Hicks	3
(China) Tian Pengfei	5
31	(England) Nigel Bond	5
(Republic of Ireland) Michael Judge	1
23	(England) Stuart Bingham	4
(England) David Roe	5
25	(England) Ian McCulloch	5
(England) Matthew Couch	1

Last 32; Best of 9 frames
1	(Scotland) Graeme Dott	5
(Scotland) Jamie Burnett	3
27	(England) Mark Selby	5
15	(England) Ali Carter	4
11	(England) Steve Davis	2
(Northern Ireland) Gerard Greene	5
(Wales) Dominic Dale	5
7	(England) Peter Ebdon	3
8	(Wales) Mark Williams	5
(England) Andrew Norman	1
17	(Wales) Ryan Day	5
12	(England) Barry Hawkins	1
14	(Wales) Matthew Stevens	5
28	(England) Mark King	0
(England) Stuart Pettman	4
4	(England) Ronnie O'Sullivan	5
3	(Republic of Ireland) Ken Doherty	5
24	(Thailand) James Wattana	4
(England) Mike Dunn	2
9	(Scotland) Stephen Maguire	5
16	(England) Anthony Hamilton	3
26	(China) Ding Junhui	5
32	(England) Robert Milkins	3
4	(Scotland) John Higgins	5
5	(England) Shaun Murphy	5
(China) Tian Pengfei	4
31	(England) Nigel Bond	3
13	(Australia) Neil Robertson	5
10	(England) Stephen Lee	5
(England) David Roe	2
25	(England) Ian McCulloch	3
2	(Scotland) Stephen Hendry	5

Last 16; Best of 9 frames
1	(Scotland) Graeme Dott	5
27	(England) Mark Selby	4
(Northern Ireland) Gerard Greene	4
(Wales) Dominic Dale	5
8	(Wales) Mark Williams	2
17	(Wales) Ryan Day	5
14	(Wales) Matthew Stevens	2
4	(England) Ronnie O'Sullivan	5
2	(Republic of Ireland) Ken Doherty	5
9	(Scotland) Stephen Maguire	4
26	(China) Ding Junhui	5
4	(Scotland) John Higgins	3
5	(England) Shaun Murphy	5
13	(Australia) Neil Robertson	4
10	(England) Stephen Lee	5
2	(Scotland) Stephen Hendry	4

Quarter-finals; Best of 9 frames
1	(Scotland) Graeme Dott	2
(Wales) Dominic Dale	5
17	(Wales) Ryan Day	1
4	(England) Ronnie O'Sullivan	5
2	(Republic of Ireland) Ken Doherty	1
26	(China) Ding Junhui	5
5	(England) Shaun Murphy	4
10	(England) Stephen Lee	5

Semi-finals; Best of 11 frames
(Wales) Dominic Dale	0
4	(England) Ronnie O'Sullivan	6
26	(China) Ding Junhui	6
10	(England) Stephen Lee	1

Final; Best of 17 frames
4	(England) Ronnie O'Sullivan	6
26	(China) Ding Junhui	9

== Qualifying ==
Qualifying for the tournament took place at Pontins in Prestatyn, Wales between 29 and 31 July 2006.

Round 1 Best of 9 frames
Lee Spick (ENG)
Bye
(China) Liu Song	5
(Malta) Alex Borg	3
(England) Judd Trump	5
(Thailand) Passakorn Suwannawat	3
(England) Paul Davison	4
(Northern Ireland) Dermot McGlinchey	5
(England) Andrew Higginson	5
(England) Peter Lines	0
(England) Sean Storey	5
(England) James Leadbetter	4
(England) Chris Norbury	5
(Scotland) Mark Boyle	3
(England) Lee Page	5
(Germany) Patrick Einsle	0
(United Arab Emirates) Mohammed Shehab	3
(England) Ben Woollaston	5
(England) Alfie Burden	5
(Thailand) Issara Kachaiwong	4
(Wales) Ian Preece	4
(Wales) Jamie Jones	5
(England) Chris Melling
Bye
(China) Tian Pengfei	5
(Netherlands) Roy Stolk	0
(China) Liang Wenbo	5
(Scotland) Robert Stephen	0
(England) Mark Joyce	5
(Republic of Ireland) David Morris	4
(England) Matthew Couch	5
(England) Jeff Cundy	2

Round 2 Best of 9 frames
(Scotland) Jamie Burnett	5
(England) Lee Spick	3
(Malta) Tony Drago	5
(China) Liu Song	3
(Scotland) Scott MacKenzie	0
(England) Judd Trump	5
(Pakistan) Shokat Ali	2
(Northern Ireland) Dermot McGlinchey	5
(England) Andrew Norman	5
(England) Andrew Higginson	3
(Northern Ireland) Mark Allen	5
(England) Sean Storey	1
(England) Rory McLeod	5
(England) Chris Norbury	4
(England) Stuart Pettman	5
(England) Lee Page	3
(England) Jimmy Michie	5
(England) Ben Woollaston	3
(England) Mike Dunn	5
(England) Alfie Burden	3
(Wales) Paul Davies	5
(Wales) Jamie Jones	1
(Republic of Ireland) Joe Delaney	5
(England) Chris Melling	3
(Finland) Robin Hull	1
(China) Tian Pengfei	5
(England) David Gilbert	5
(China) Liang Wenbo	0
(England) David Roe	5
(England) Mark Joyce	2
(England) Joe Jogia	2
(England) Matthew Couch	5

Round 3 Best of 9 frames
(England) Dave Harold	1
(Scotland) Jamie Burnett	5
(Scotland) Marcus Campbell	1
(Malta) Tony Drago	5
(Northern Ireland) Gerard Greene	5
(England) Judd Trump	2
(Wales) Dominic Dale	5
(Northern Ireland) Dermot McGlinchey	1
(England) John Parrott	1
(England) Andrew Norman	5
(England) Tom Ford	3
(Northern Ireland) Mark Allen	5
(England) Ricky Walden	3
(England) Rory McLeod	5
(England) Barry Pinches	4
(England) Stuart Pettman	5
(England) Jimmy White	3
(England) Jimmy Michie	5
(England) Mark Davis	3
(England) Mike Dunn	5
(Republic of Ireland) Fergal O'Brien	3
(Wales) Paul Davies	5
(England) Rod Lawler	5
(Republic of Ireland) Joe Delaney	3
(England) Jamie Cope	3
(China) Tian Pengfei	5
(Republic of Ireland) Michael Judge	5
(England) David Gilbert	1
(England) Adrian Gunnell	4
(England) David Roe	5
(Scotland) Drew Henry	4
(England) Matthew Couch	5

== Century breaks ==
=== Qualifying stage centuries ===
- 136 – Issara Kachaiwong
- 130 – Jimmy Michie
- 127 – James Leadbetter
- 126, 113 – David Roe
- 125 – Jamie Burnett
- 123 – Alfie Burden
- 120 – Adrian Gunnell
- 119, 107 – Michael Judge
- 117 – Tom Ford
- 115 – Mark Allen
- 113, 100 – Matthew Couch
- 113 – Chris Melling
- 112 – Gerard Greene
- 112 – David Morris
- 110 – David Gilbert
- 103 – Dominic Dale
- 102 – Sean Storey
- 100 – Jamie Cope

=== Televised stage centuries ===
- 140, 115, 113, 106, 106, 104, 103 – Ronnie O'Sullivan
- 137, 104, 100 – Dominic Dale
- 131 – Stephen Maguire
- 130 – Ken Doherty
- 128 – Peter Ebdon
- 122 – Michael Judge
- 117 – Jamie Burnett
- 115, 100 – Tian Pengfei
- 112, 103 – Stephen Hendry
- 111 – Neil Robertson
- 109 – Graeme Dott
- 108 – Mark Williams
- 107 – Mark Selby
- 103 – Jimmy Michie
- 103 – Ding Junhui
- 101 – Anthony Hamilton

== Sources ==
- Draw. Sporting Life (UK). Retrieved 14 October 2010.
- "Northern Ireland Trophy 2006". Snooker.org. Retrieved 8 October 2010.
- "2006 Northern Ireland Trophy Results Grid". snookerdatabase.co.uk (Snooker Database). Retrieved 14 October 2010.
- "World Rankings 2006/2007". snooker.org. Retrieved 8 October 2010.
