= 2015 Indian Open =

Indian Open
Tournament information
- Dates: 10–14 March 2015
- Venue: Grand Hyatt
- City: Mumbai
- Country: India
- Organisation: World Snooker
- Format: Ranking event
- Winner's share: £50,000
- Highest break: Stuart Carrington (ENG) (138)

Final
- Champion: Michael White (WAL)
- Runner-up: Ricky Walden (ENG)
- Score: 5–0

The 2015 Indian Open was a professional ranking snooker tournament that took place between 10 and 14 March 2015 at the Grand Hyatt in Mumbai, India. The tournament was originally scheduled for 13–17 October 2014, but was postponed until March due to the State Election in Maharashtra.

Mumbai played host to the tournament for the first time, having previously being held at the Le Meridien Hotel in New Delhi.

Ding Junhui was the defending champion, but he lost 3–4 against Thepchaiya Un-Nooh in the last 64.

Michael White won his first ranking event by defeating Ricky Walden 5–0 in the final.

== Prize fund ==
The breakdown of prize money for this year is shown below:

- Winner: £50,000
- Runner-up: £25,000
- Semi-final: £13,500
- Quarter-final: £9,000
- Last 16: £6,000
- Last 32: £3,000
- Last 64: £2,000

== Wildcard round ==
These matches were played in Mumbai on 10 March 2015. The Indian wildcard players were selected through a qualifying tournament which was held at the PYC Hindu Gymkhana in Pune, India.

Match		Score	
WC1	Thepchaiya Un-Nooh (THA)	4–0	Neeraj Kumar (IND)
WC2	Sam Baird (ENG)	4–1	Brijesh Damani (IND)
WC3	Lyu Haotian (CHN)	4–3	Dharminder Lilly (IND)
WC4	Adam Duffy (ENG)	4–0	Sumit Talwar (IND)
WC5	Nigel Bond (ENG)	4–2	Faisal Khan (IND)
WC6	Rhys Clark (SCO)	4–3	Pankaj Advani (IND)

== Main draw ==
Last 64; Best of 7 frames
(China) Ding Junhui	3
(Thailand) Thepchaiya Un-Nooh	4
(Belgium) Luca Brecel	4
(Republic of Ireland) Fergal O'Brien	2
(Wales) Matthew Stevens	2
(Northern Ireland) Gerard Greene	4
(Wales) Jamie Jones	4
(China) Liang Wenbo	2
(England) Mark Davis	4
(England) Anthony Hamilton	2
(England) Tom Ford	0
(Scotland) Anthony McGill	4
(Scotland) Fraser Patrick	2
(England) Jamie Cope	4
(Scotland) Jamie Burnett	2
(Scotland) John Higgins	4
(England) Joe Perry	4
(Scotland) Marcus Campbell	2
(England) Sam Baird	0
(England) Rod Lawler	4
(England) Ben Woollaston	4
(China) Yu Delu	3
(England) Kyren Wilson	4
(Scotland) Alan McManus	0
(England) Ali Carter	w/d
(England) Mark Joyce	w/o
(China) Tian Pengfei	4
(China) Lyu Haotian	1
(England) Mark King	3
(India) Aditya Mehta	4
(England) Rory McLeod	1
(England) Ricky Walden	4
(England) Judd Trump	4
(England) Peter Lines	2
(England) Gary Wilson	3
(England) Adam Duffy	4
(England) Peter Ebdon	4
(China) Zhou Yuelong	2
(Scotland) Eden Sharav	2
(Wales) Mark Williams	4
(Scotland) Graeme Dott	4
(Finland) Robin Hull	3
(Republic of Ireland) David Morris	4
(England) David Gilbert	0
(Republic of Ireland) Ken Doherty	2
(Northern Ireland) Joe Swail	4
(England) Mike Dunn	2
(England) Robert Milkins	4
(Hong Kong) Marco Fu	w/d
(England) Stuart Carrington	w/o
(China) Li Hang	4
(England) Allan Taylor	3
(England) Matthew Selt	4
(England) Joel Walker	0
(China) Cao Yupeng	3
(Wales) Michael White	4
(Wales) Ryan Day	1
(England) Nigel Bond	4
(Thailand) Thanawat Thirapongpaiboon	1
(Thailand) Dechawat Poomjaeng	4
(Scotland) Rhys Clark	2
(England) Chris Wakelin	4
(Wales) Andrew Pagett	4
(England) Zack Richardson	2

Last 32; Best of 7 frames
(Thailand) Thepchaiya Un-Nooh	4
(Belgium) Luca Brecel	0
(Northern Ireland) Gerard Greene	3
(Wales) Jamie Jones	4
(England) Mark Davis	4
(Scotland) Anthony McGill	3
(England) Jamie Cope	2
(Scotland) John Higgins	4
(England) Joe Perry	4
(England) Rod Lawler	1
(England) Ben Woollaston	1
(England) Kyren Wilson	4
(England) Mark Joyce	1
(China) Tian Pengfei	4
(India) Aditya Mehta	2
(England) Ricky Walden	4
(England) Judd Trump	4
(England) Adam Duffy	3
(England) Peter Ebdon	3
(Wales) Mark Williams	4
(Scotland) Graeme Dott	4
(Republic of Ireland) David Morris	0
(Northern Ireland) Joe Swail	1
(England) Robert Milkins	4
(England) Stuart Carrington	1
(China) Li Hang	4
(England) Matthew Selt	2
(Wales) Michael White	4
(England) Nigel Bond	4
(Thailand) Dechawat Poomjaeng	3
(England) Chris Wakelin	4
(Wales) Andrew Pagett	1

Last 16; Best of 7 frames
(Thailand) Thepchaiya Un-Nooh	4
(Wales) Jamie Jones	1
(England) Mark Davis	4
(Scotland) John Higgins	0
(England) Joe Perry	4
(England) Kyren Wilson	3
(China) Tian Pengfei	0
(England) Ricky Walden	4
(England) Judd Trump	3
(Wales) Mark Williams	4
(Scotland) Graeme Dott	2
(England) Robert Milkins	4
(China) Li Hang	2
(Wales) Michael White	4
(England) Nigel Bond	1
(England) Chris Wakelin	4

Quarter-finals; Best of 7 frames
(Thailand) Thepchaiya Un-Nooh	4
(England) Mark Davis	2
(England) Joe Perry	2
(England) Ricky Walden	4
(Wales) Mark Williams	4
(England) Robert Milkins	1
(Wales) Michael White	4
(England) Chris Wakelin	2

Semi-finals; Best of 7 frames
(Thailand) Thepchaiya Un-Nooh	3
(England) Ricky Walden	4
(Wales) Mark Williams	2
(Wales) Michael White	4

Final; Best of 9 frames
(England) Ricky Walden	0
(Wales) Michael White	5

== Final ==
Final: Best of 9 frames. Referee: Terry Camilleri. Grand Hyatt, Mumbai, India, 14 March 2015.
Ricky Walden; England	0–5	Michael White; Wales
0–81 (81), 20–77 (77), 0–86, 1–90 (58), 6–85 (85)
20	Highest break	85
0	Century breaks	0
0	50+ breaks	4

== Qualifying ==
These matches were held on 12 and 13 February 2015 at the Barnsley Metrodome in Barnsley, England. The qualifiers were to take place between 18 and 21 September 2014, but were rescheduled as the ranking event was postponed. All matches were best of 7 frames.

(China) Ding Junhui	4–1	(England) Barry Pinches
(Thailand) Thepchaiya Un-Nooh	4–0	(England) Joe Roberts
(Belgium) Luca Brecel	4–3	(China) Lu Ning
(Republic of Ireland) Fergal O'Brien	4–0	(England) William Lemons
(Wales) Matthew Stevens	4–1	(England) Ian Glover
(Northern Ireland) Gerard Greene	4–0	(Qatar) Ahmed Saif
(Wales) Jamie Jones	4–2	(England) Sean O'Sullivan
(China) Liang Wenbo	4–1	(England) James Cahill
(England) Mark Davis	4–0	(England) Elliot Slessor
(England) Anthony Hamilton	4–1	(England) Michael Georgiou
(England) Tom Ford	4–1	(England) Chris Melling
(Scotland) Anthony McGill	4–0	(England) Ian Burns
(England) Andrew Higginson	3–4	(Scotland) Fraser Patrick
(England) Jamie Cope	4–3	(Scotland) Ross Muir
(Scotland) Jamie Burnett	4–3	(England) Steven Hallworth
(Scotland) John Higgins	4–0	(England) Adam Bobat
(England) Joe Perry	4–2	(England) Ashley Carty
(Scotland) Marcus Campbell	4–2	(England) Zak Surety
(England) Sam Baird	4–0	(Isle of Man) Darryl Hill
(England) Rod Lawler	4–0	(England) Craig Steadman
(England) Ben Woollaston	4–1	(Switzerland) Alexander Ursenbacher
(China) Yu Delu	4–3	(Republic of Ireland) Martin McCrudden
(England) Kyren Wilson	4–1	(England) Joe O'Connor
(Scotland) Alan McManus	4–1	(China) Cao Xinlong
(England) Ali Carter	4–1	(England) Lee Page
(England) Mark Joyce	4–1	(England) John Astley
(England) Robbie Williams	0–4	(China) Tian Pengfei
(Wales) Dominic Dale	2–4	(China) Lyu Haotian
(England) Mark King	4–1	(England) David Grace
(India) Aditya Mehta	4–0	(England) Hammad Miah
(England) Rory McLeod	4–1	(Wales) Callum Lloyd
(England) Ricky Walden	4–0	(England) Matthew Day

(England) Judd Trump	4–0	(England) Martin Ball
(England) Peter Lines	4–3	(China) Lu Chenwei
(England) Gary Wilson	4–1	(Wales) Daniel Wells
(England) Jack Lisowski	2–4	(England) Adam Duffy
(England) Peter Ebdon	4–3	(England) Paul Davison
(England) Jimmy White	2–4	(China) Zhou Yuelong
(England) Dave Harold	1–4	(Scotland) Eden Sharav
(Wales) Mark Williams	4–1	(China) Zhang Anda
(Scotland) Graeme Dott	4–3	(Scotland) Scott Donaldson
(Finland) Robin Hull	4–1	(England) Chris Norbury
(Republic of Ireland) David Morris	4–2	(England) Michael Wasley
(England) David Gilbert	4–0	(England) Nico Elton
(Republic of Ireland) Ken Doherty	4–3	(England) Sanderson Lam
(Northern Ireland) Joe Swail	4–2	(Wales) Jak Jones
(England) Mike Dunn	4–3	(Wales) Jamie Clarke
(England) Robert Milkins	4–2	(England) Alex Davies
(Hong Kong) Marco Fu	4–2	(England) Sydney Wilson
(England) Stuart Carrington	4–2	(Wales) Lee Walker
(China) Li Hang	4–2	(England) Oliver Lines
(England) Michael Holt	3–4	(England) Allan Taylor
(England) Matthew Selt	4–0	(Brazil) Igor Figueiredo
(England) Alfie Burden	3–4	(England) Joel Walker
(China) Cao Yupeng	4–2	(Scotland) Michael Leslie
(Wales) Michael White	4–0	(England) Mitchell Mann
(Wales) Ryan Day	4–3	(England) Oliver Brown
(England) Nigel Bond	4–3	(England) Liam Highfield
(England) Jimmy Robertson	0–4	(Thailand) Thanawat Thirapongpaiboon
(Thailand) Dechawat Poomjaeng	4–1	(Malaysia) Thor Chuan Leong
(Norway) Kurt Maflin	3–4	(Scotland) Rhys Clark
(England) Chris Wakelin	4–3	(England) Saqib Nasir
(Thailand) Noppon Saengkham	2–4	(Wales) Andrew Pagett
(England) Barry Hawkins	w/d–w/o	(England) Zack Richardson

== Century breaks ==
=== Qualifying stage centuries ===
- 133, 120 – Kyren Wilson
- 130 – Tian Pengfei
- 128 – Thepchaiya Un-Nooh
- 125 – John Higgins
- 124, 103 – Ken Doherty
- 124 – Sam Baird
- 122 – Alan McManus
- 109 – Gerard Greene
- 106 – Anthony Hamilton
- 104 – Chris Norbury
- 103 – Mark King
- 102 – David Gilbert
- 101 – Gary Wilson
- 101 – Joe Swail
- 101 – Peter Ebdon
- 100 – Robin Hull

=== Televised stage centuries ===
- 138 – Stuart Carrington
- 137, 123, 101 – Thepchaiya Un-Nooh
- 136 – John Higgins
- 127, 108, 106 – Mark Williams
- 126, 109, 100 – Michael White
- 119, 105 – Kyren Wilson
- 119, 102 – Ding Junhui
- 119 – Ricky Walden
- 112, 101 – Luca Brecel
- 109 – Nigel Bond
- 106 – Tian Pengfei
- 104 – Judd Trump
- 103 – Matthew Selt
- 101 – Jamie Cope
- 100 – Ben Woollaston
