= 2017 CVB Snooker Challenge =

CVB Snooker Challenge
Tournament information
- Dates: 28–29 July 2017
- Venue: Nanshan Culture & Sports Centre
- City: Shenzhen
- Country: China
- Organisation: WPBSA/CBSA
- Format: Non-ranking team event
- Total prize fund: £120,000
- Winner's share: £80,000

Final
- Champion: (United Kingdom) Great Britain; Ronnie O'Sullivan; Mark Williams; Graeme Dott; Joe Perry; Michael Holt
- Runner-up: China; Ding Junhui; Liang Wenbo; Zhou Yuelong; Yan Bingtao; Zhao Xintong
- Score: 26–9

The 2017 Camsing Global CVB Snooker Challenge was a professional non-ranking team snooker tournament that took place on 28 and 29 July 2017, at Nanshan Culture & Sports Centre in Shenzhen, China. It was played over 35 frames with every frame being played. Great Britain beat China by 26 frames to 9.

== Format ==
- The competition consisted of two teams, the Chinese team and the British team, each team consisting of five players.
- There were 10 matches with a total of 35 frames, 19 frames for singles and 16 frames for doubles; all 35 frames were played.

== Prize fund ==
- Winner: £80,000 team (£16,000 per player)
- Runner-up: £40,000 team (£8,000 per player)

== Teams and players ==
| Nation | Player 1 | Player 2 | Player 3 | Player 4 | Player 5 |
|---|---|---|---|---|---|
| China | Ding Junhui | Liang Wenbo | Zhou Yuelong | Yan Bingtao | Zhao Xintong |
| Great Britain | Ronnie O'Sullivan | Mark Williams | Graeme Dott | Joe Perry | Michael Holt |

== Results ==
=== Day 1 ===
| (United Kingdom) Mark Williams | 2–1 | (China) Zhao Xintong |
| (United Kingdom) Mark Williams | 3–0 | (China) Liang Wenbo |
| (United Kingdom) Graeme Dott & Michael Holt | 0–2 | (China) Zhou Yuelong & Yan Bingtao |
| (United Kingdom) Joe Perry & Michael Holt | 2–0 | (China) Yan Bingtao & Zhao Xintong |
| (United Kingdom) Ronnie O'Sullivan | 6–1 | (China) Ding Junhui |

=== Day 2 ===
| (United Kingdom) Graeme Dott & Joe Perry | 2–1 | (China) Zhou Yuelong & Zhao Xintong |
| (United Kingdom) Michael Holt | 2–1 | (China) Yan Bingtao |
| (United Kingdom) Graeme Dott & Joe Perry | 2–0 | (China) Ding Junhui & Liang Wenbo |
| (United Kingdom) Ronnie O'Sullivan | 3–0 | (China) Zhou Yuelong |
| (United Kingdom) Ronnie O'Sullivan & Mark Williams | 4–3 | (China) Ding Junhui & Liang Wenbo |

=== Final score ===
Great Britain 26–9 China

== Century breaks ==
- 135 – Graeme Dott & Joe Perry (Doubles Frame alternate shots)
- 131 – Ronnie O'Sullivan & Mark Williams (Doubles Frame alternate shots)
- 102 – Michael Holt
