= Ding Junhui =

Chinese snooker player (born 1987)

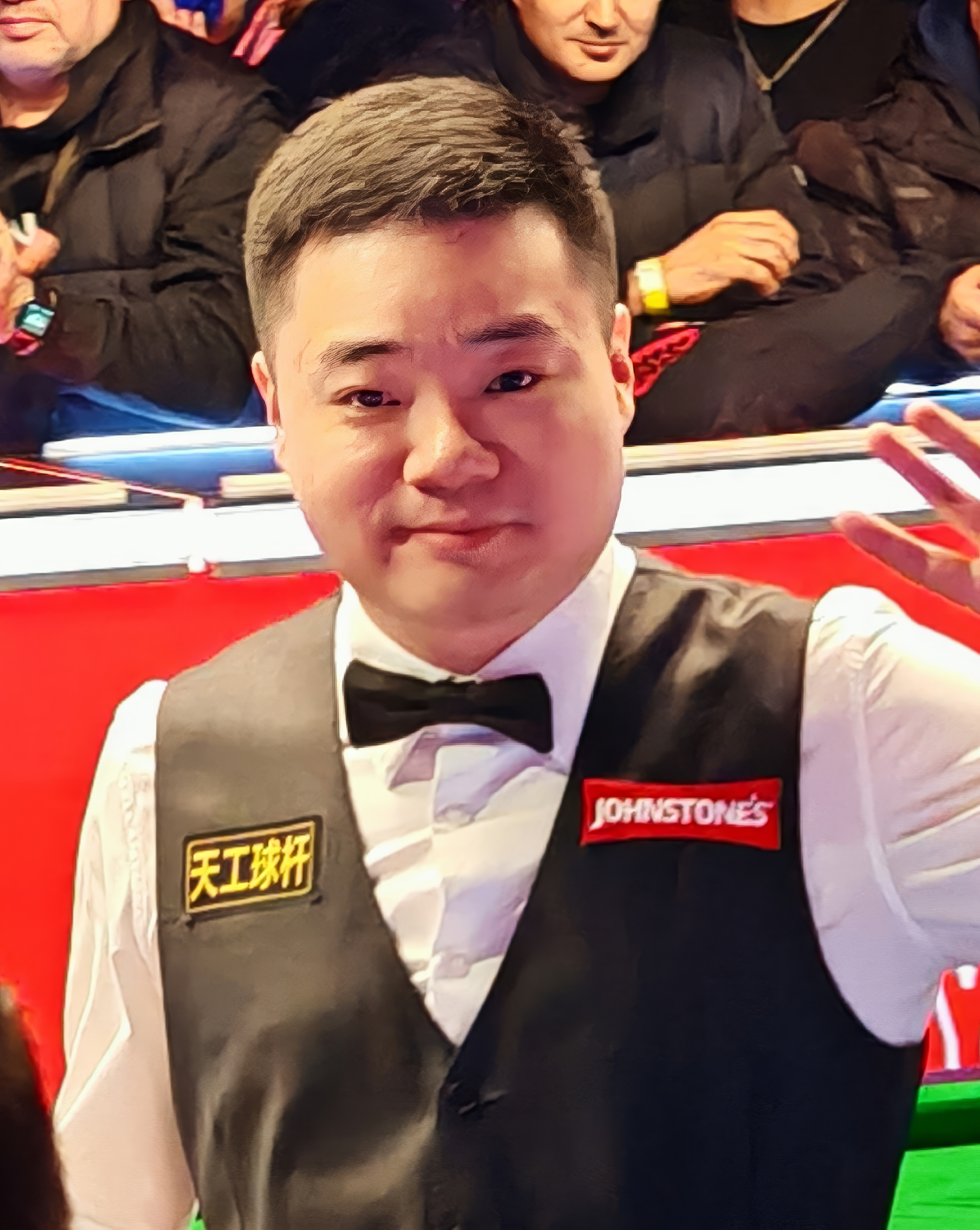
- Ding at the 2025 Masters

Personal information
- Nickname: The Dragon
- Born: 1 April 1987 (age 39) Yixing, Jiangsu, China

Sport
- Country: China
- Sport: Snooker
- Professional: 2003–present
- Highest ranking: 1 (December 2014, January–February 2015)
- Current ranking: 23 (as of 7 November 2026)
- Maximum breaks: 7
- Century breaks: 740 (as of 19 November 2026)

Tournament wins
- Ranking: 15
- Minor-ranking: 4
Medal record
Men's snooker
Representing China
World Games
Silver medal – second place	2005 Duisburg	Individual
Asian Games
Gold medal – first place	2002 Busan	Individual
Silver medal – second place	2002 Busan	Team
Gold medal – first place	2006 Doha	Individual
Gold medal – first place	2006 Doha	Doubles
Gold medal – first place	2006 Doha	Team
Silver medal – second place	2010 Guangzhou	Individual
Gold medal – first place	2010 Guangzhou	Team
Asian Indoor and Martial Arts Games
Silver medal – second place	2013 Incheon	Individual
Gold medal – first place	2013 Incheon	Team

Ding Junhui
- Simplified Chinese: 丁俊晖
- Traditional Chinese: 丁俊暉
Transcriptions
Standard Mandarin
- Hanyu Pinyin: Dīng Jùnhuī
- IPA: [tíŋ tɕwə̂n xwéɪ]
Yue: Cantonese
- Yale Romanization: Dīng Jeun Fāi
- Jyutping: Ding¹ Zeon³ Fai¹

Ding Junhui (Chinese: 丁俊晖; born 1 April 1987) is a Chinese professional snooker player. He is the most successful Asian player in the history of the sport. Throughout his career, he has won 15 major ranking titles, including three UK Championships (2005, 2009, 2019), and in 2014, became the first Asian world number one. He has twice reached the final of the Masters, winning once in 2011. In 2016, he became the first Asian player to reach the final of the World Championship.

Ding began playing snooker at age nine and rose to international prominence in 2002 after winning the Asian Under-21 Championship and the Asian Championship. At age 15, he became the youngest winner of the IBSF World Under-21 Championship. In 2003, Ding turned professional at the age of 16. His first major professional successes came in 2005 when he won the China Open and the UK Championship, becoming the first player from outside Great Britain and Ireland to win the title.

During his career, he has compiled 700 century breaks, including seven maximum breaks, in professional play. He was the first Asian player to be ranked world number one, which he achieved in 2014 to become the 11th player to reach the top spot. He is a long-time resident of Sheffield, England, and owns the Ding Junhui Snooker Academy in the same city.

== Early life ==
Ding Junhui was born on 1 April 1987, in Yixing, Jiangsu. At eight years old, Ding accompanied his father, a pool enthusiast, who wanted to practice with a local pool expert. When his father went for a toilet break, Ding took the cue and played with the professional. Ding won the game before his father returned. Since then, Ding's parents supported him in cue sports training, particularly snooker. At age nine, he was taken by his father to the training centre of the Chinese national snooker team near Shanghai and persuaded his mother to sell their home and grocery business so Ding could continue playing snooker as a career. The family moved to Dongguan, Guangdong, and Ding left formal education at age 11 to practice snooker for eight hours each day.

== Career ==
=== Early career ===
Ding rose to international prominence in 2002 at age 15, when he won the Asian Under-21 Championship, the Asian Championship, and became the youngest ever winner of the IBSF World Under-21 Championship. He was unable to progress much in 2003 when both Asian tournaments were canceled because of the 2002–03 SARS virus outbreak, but he reached the semi-finals of the IBSF World Under-21 Championship, and the World Professional Billiards and Snooker Association (WPBSA) awarded him a concession to play on the main snooker tour, which enabled him to turn professional in September 2003. In the same year, Ding became the number-one-ranked player in China.

=== First UK Championship and reaching the top-16 (2004–2007) ===
In February 2004, Ding was awarded a wildcard entry to the Masters held in London. In the wildcard round, he beat the world number 16 player Joe Perry. In the first round, he lost 5–6 to Stephen Lee after leading 5–2. In April 2005, Ding celebrated his 18th birthday by reaching the final of the China Open in Beijing, defeating world top 16 ranked players Peter Ebdon, Marco Fu, and Ken Doherty. In the final, Ding beat the world number three Stephen Hendry by 9–5 to win his first ranking tournament. The match was watched by 110 million people on China's national sports channel CCTV-5; it was the largest television audience recorded for a snooker match. In December 2005, Ding beat Jimmy White, Paul Hunter, and Joe Perry to reach the final of the UK Championship. In the final, he beat Steve Davis by 10–6 to become the first player from outside the UK to win the tournament. Ding's provisional world ranking rose from 62 at the start of the 2005–06 season to 27 at the end of the season.

At the 2006 China Open, Ding lost 2–6 in the semi-finals to eventual winner Mark Williams. During the Northern Ireland Trophy event, he beat Stephen Lee 6–1 in the semi-finals. In the final, Ding defeated Ronnie O'Sullivan 9–6 to win his third ranking tournament, becoming the third person under 20 to do so after O'Sullivan and John Higgins. In December 2006, Ding won three gold medals at the 2006 Asian Games, winning the single, double, and team snooker competitions. The following week, he reached the quarter-finals of the 2006 UK Championship as the defending champion, but lost 5–9 to his practice partner and eventual winner Peter Ebdon. Ding ended the 2006–07 season ranked world number nine, which was his first top-ten placement.

=== Youngest maximum break and wildcard Masters finalist (2007–2009) ===
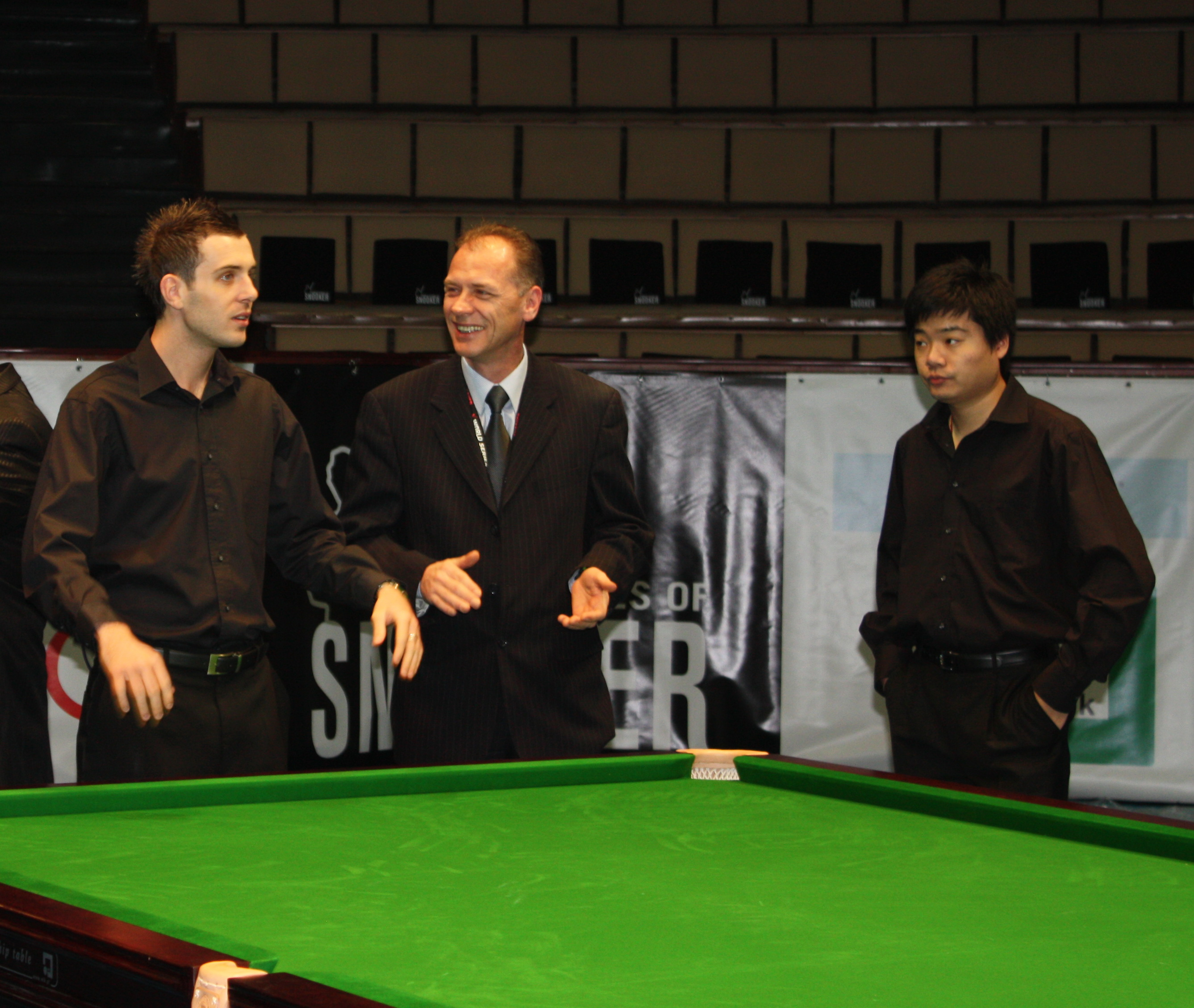
Mark Selby (left) and Ding at the World Series of Snooker in Moscow, 2008

In January 2007, Ding defeated Cao Xinlong 5–4 to reach the final of the Chinese National Championship in his home town of Yixing, Jiangsu. He defeated Xiao Guodong in the final by 6–2 to become the national champion again. On 14 January, Ding made a 147 break in his first-round match against Anthony Hamilton at the Masters, which was Ding's first maximum break and the first maximum break made at the competition since Kirk Stevens' in 1984. The break made Ding the youngest player to make a televised 147—a record previously held by Ronnie O'Sullivan—and the first Chinese player to make a televised maximum. Ding played O'Sullivan in the final, becoming the second-youngest player and the first Asian player to reach a Masters' final.

After Ding won the first two frames, O'Sullivan went on to dominate the match. This, along with the boisterous and hostile nature of the London crowd, led Ding to leave the table in tears during the twelfth frame when he was trailing 3–8 in the best-of-19-frames contest. Ding appeared resigned to defeat, taking little time to consider his shot selection, and shook hands with O'Sullivan after the frame. O'Sullivan consoled Ding and they walked arm-in-arm to the backstage area. Because it was the last frame before the mid-session interval, it was uncertain whether Ding had conceded the match. O'Sullivan won the match in the first frame after the interval; Ding later said he thought the match was a "best of 17".

Ding was defeated in the first round of the next two consecutive tournaments, losing 2–5 to Stephen Maguire in the 2007 Malta Cup and 1–5 to Jamie Cope in the Welsh Open. In March 2007, Ding qualified for the televised stages of the World Championship for the first time after beating Mark Davis in the final qualifying round. His losing streak in ranking tournaments continued, with a 3–5 loss to Barry Hawkins in the first round of the China Open and a 2–10 loss against O'Sullivan at the World Championship. Despite this, Ding ended the 2006–07 season ranked world number 11.

The following season, Ding was consistent, reaching the last 16 of all-but-one ranking event. However, he failed to reach a single semi-final, causing him to drop to number 13 in the world rankings. At the 2008 World Snooker Championship, Ding reached the second round for the first time, beating Marco Fu 10–9 before losing 7–13 to Stephen Hendry. During the 2007 Premier League Snooker, Ding recorded 495 unanswered points (most points without reply) against Stephen Hendry, setting a record for the most unanswered points in any professional snooker tournament. The record was surpassed in 2014 when Ronnie O'Sullivan recorded 556 unanswered points against Ricky Walden.

Ding started the 2008–09 season on a high, winning the Jiangsu Classic after beating Ryan Day 4–0 in the semi-final and Mark Selby 6–5 in the final. In October, he participated in the third event of the World Series of Snooker. Ding won the event after defeating Ken Doherty 6–4 in the final. In the fourth event in November, Ding defeated Mark Selby 4–2 in the semi-final, before losing 0–5 to John Higgins in the final. On 16 December, in his second-round match against John Higgins at the 2008 UK Championship, Ding scored a maximum 147 break in the third frame.

=== Second UK Championship (2009/2010) ===
Ding began the 2009/2010 season by reaching the quarter-finals of the Shanghai Masters. He reached the final of the Grand Prix by defeating Matthew Stevens 5–4 in the first round, Stephen Maguire 5–1 in the second round, Peter Ebdon 5–2 in the quarter-finals, and Mark Williams 6–1 in the semi-finals, losing 4–9 to Neil Robertson in the final. At the 2009 UK Championship, Ding reached the final after defeating Mike Dunn 9–5, Shaun Murphy 9–3, Ali Carter 9–8, and Stephen Maguire 9–5. He went on to defeat John Higgins 10–8 in the final to win his second UK title.

After losing against Mark Selby 1–6 at the Masters and Jamie Cope 3–5 at the Welsh Open, Ding returned to form, scoring nine century breaks on his way to the final of the China Open. He lost 6–10 to Mark Williams despite leading 5–4 at the end of the first session. At the World Championship, Ding defeated Stuart Pettman 10–1 in the first round. He lost 10–13 against Shaun Murphy in the second round. Ding ended the season ranked world number five, an increase of eight places from the previous season.

=== Masters winner (2010/2011) ===
At the 2010 Wuxi Classic, Ding lost 8–9 in the final despite leading 8–2. Ding reached the second round of the Shanghai Masters and the quarter-finals of the World Open, where he lost 1–5 to Jamie Cope and 2–3 to Mark Williams. Ding failed to defend his 2010 UK Championship title, losing 8–9 against Mark Allen. In January 2011, Ding reached his second Masters final, beating Jamie Cope 6–3 in the semi-final. Ding won the Masters for the first time, beating Marco Fu 10–4 in the first-ever all-Chinese Masters final.

Ding had a career-best run at the 2011 World Snooker Championship. He beat Jamie Burnett 10–2 in the first round, advancing to the last 16 of the World Championship for the fourth consecutive year. He played Stuart Bingham in the second round; he was losing 9–12 with his opponent needing one frame for victory but Ding made a comeback, winning four consecutive frames to win 13–12 and reach the quarter-finals of the world championship for the first time in his career. In his quarter-final with Mark Selby, Ding led 10–6 after the first two sessions of the match. Selby built strong momentum by winning the first four frames of the last session to level at 10–10. Ding won the match 13–10 to set up a semi-final against Judd Trump. In their semi-final, Ding and Trump were level at 12–12 after the third session. In the last session, Trump built momentum and led 14–12 but Ding won the next three frames with a 138 break to tie Mark King for highest tournament break and a 119 break. Ding lost the next three frames and lost the match 15–17. He ended the season with a career-high ranking of world number four.

=== Fifth ranking event win (2011/2012) ===
At the 2011 Wuxi Classic, Ding lost 5–6 to Mark Selby in the semi-finals, failing to reach the tournament's final for the first time. At the World Cup, Ding and Liang Wenbo partnered to represent China. They won the final, 4–2, against Northern Ireland. Ding lost 2–5 against Stuart Bingham in the first round of the Australian Goldfields Open. At the second event of the Players Tour Championship, Ding reached the final but lost 0–4 against Judd Trump. Ding was knocked out by Neil Robertson 6–2 in the quarter-finals of the 2011 UK Championship. Ronnie O'Sullivan defeated Ding in the Masters for the third time in his career, losing in the first round 4–6.

Ding beat Mark Selby in the 2012 Welsh Open to win his fifth ranking tournament and £30,000. Ding's form continued. He won the 2012 Championship League tournament and a place in the 2012 Premier League. Ding reached the semi-finals of the China Open but was eliminated after losing 3–6 to eventual winner Peter Ebdon. Ding ended the season with a defeat in the first round of the World Championship, losing 9–10 to Ryan Day having had a 9–6 lead. After the match, Ding criticised the condition of the tables at the event and the attitude of the audience, saying both were "rubbish". He finished the year ranked world number 11, having dropped seven places during the season.

=== Players Tour Championship (2012/2013) ===
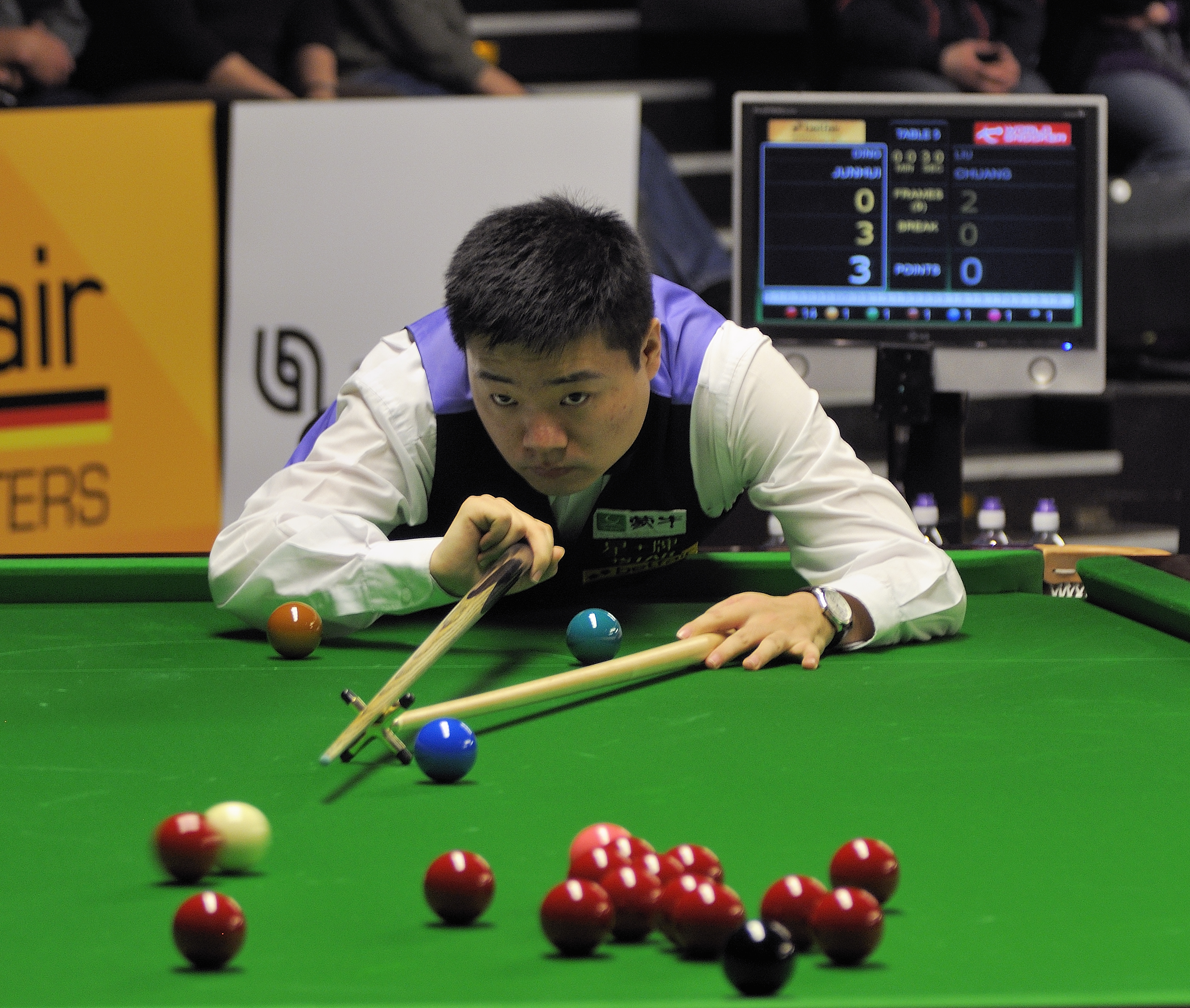
Ding Junhui at the 2013 German Masters

Ding did not progress past the second round of the first six ranking events of the 2012–13 season and found himself ranked world number 11 in December. He won the minor-ranking Scottish Open, defeating Anthony McGill in the final. Ding's form then improved; at the Welsh Open, he beat Mark King, Mark Allen, and Robert Milkins to reach the semi-finals, where he was beaten 5–6 by Stuart Bingham. At the World Open, he was defeated 0–5 by John Higgins in the quarter-finals. His title at the Scottish Open formed part of the Players Tour Championship events. Ding finished sixth on the order of merit to qualify for the finals.

At the finals, Ding made the fifth 147 of his career in the first frame of his quarter-final against Allen and made two more century breaks in a 4–3 win. He beat Kurt Maflin 4–0 in the semi-finals; in the final, he recovered from 0–3 against Neil Robertson to take his sixth ranking title with a 4–3 win. Ding made eight century breaks in the 20 frames he won during the tournament; no other player scored more than one. His poor form in tournaments played in China continued; he was beaten 3–5 by Barry Hawkins in the first round of the China Open. Ding beat veteran Alan McManus 10–5 in the first round of the World Championship and recovered from 2–6 after the first session against Mark King in the second round to lead 9–7 after the next session and won 13–9. Ding faced Barry Hawkins in the quarter-finals and played inconsistently throughout the match, losing 7–13. His end-of-season world ranking was 10.

=== Three consecutive ranking wins (2013/2014) ===
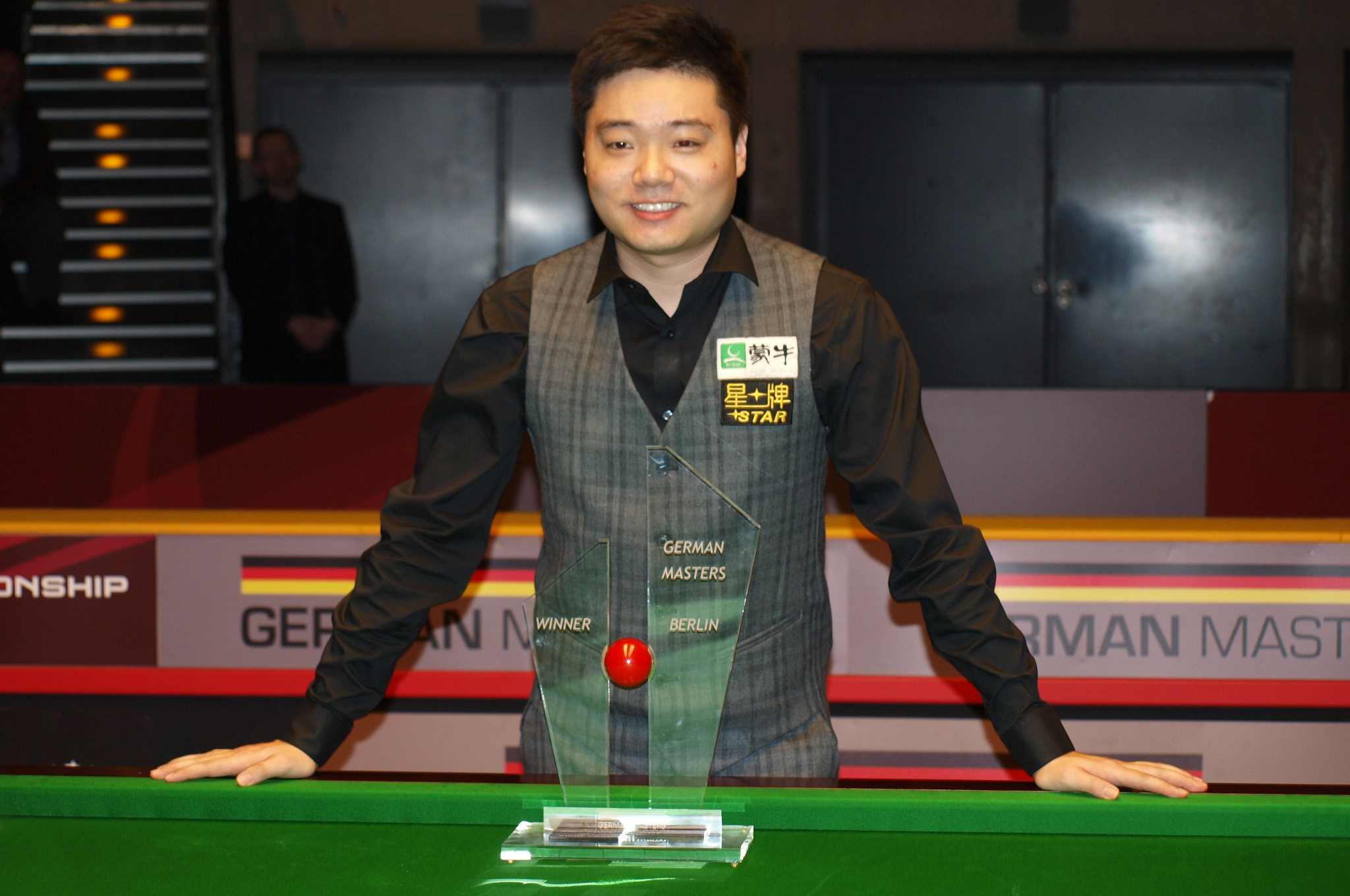
Ding with the 2014 German Masters trophy

In the second round of the 2013 Wuxi Classic, Ding lost 1–5 to Joe Perry. At the minor-ranking Bluebell Wood Open, he made a rare 146 break while beating Jimmy Robertson in the quarter-finals before losing 3–4 to Marco Fu in the semi-finals. In September 2013, Ding won his seventh ranking event title at the Shanghai Masters. The final against Xiao Guodong was the first all-Chinese final of a ranking event in the history of snooker. Ding made a century break and seven more breaks above 50 to win 10–6. He then played at the Ruhr Open, a minor-ranking event, losing 1–4 to Mark Allen in the final.

Following that, Ding played in the first Indian Open, defeating Aditya Mehta 5–0 in the final to become the first player to win back-to-back major-ranking event titles in the same season since Ronnie O'Sullivan in 2003. Ding continued dominating the game in the following major ranking event, the International Championship, where he beat Graeme Dott 9–7 in the semi-finals with a 63-point clearance in the last frame. In the final—the second all-Chinese ranking event final in three ranking events—Ding and Marco Fu compiled seven century breaks; Ding five and Fu two. Ding rallied from 8–9 down to win the final two frames and became the first player to win three consecutive major-ranking events since Stephen Hendry won five consecutively in 1990.

After his hat-trick, Ding reached world number three in the rankings for the first time in his career, before reaching number two just behind Neil Robertson. Ding won two more ranking titles; the German Masters, beating Judd Trump 9–5 in the final, and the China Open by beating Robertson 10–5 in the final to equal Hendry's season record of five wins. He was also the runner-up in the Welsh Open to Ronnie O'Sullivan. At the World Championship, however, Ding was defeated by world number 75 Michael Wasley 10–9 in the first round, which Ding had led 6–3 and 9–8. Ding finished the season ranked world number two—a career high—and was held off the number-one spot by Mark Selby, who won the World Championship. Ding was fined £5,000 and referred to the WPBSA Disciplinary Committee by the WSL for failing to attend their awards dinner.

=== 2014/2015 ===
At the start of the 2014–15 season, Ding failed to qualify for the televised stages of the 2014 Wuxi Classic, losing 0–5 to Oliver Brown in the qualifiers. Ding, however, then won the Yixing Open with a 4–2 victory over Michael Holt in the final. At the Shanghai Masters, he was defeated 6–4 by Stuart Bingham in the semi-finals after losing the last four frames of the match. Ronnie O'Sullivan eliminated Ding 6–4 in the semi-finals of the Champion of Champions.

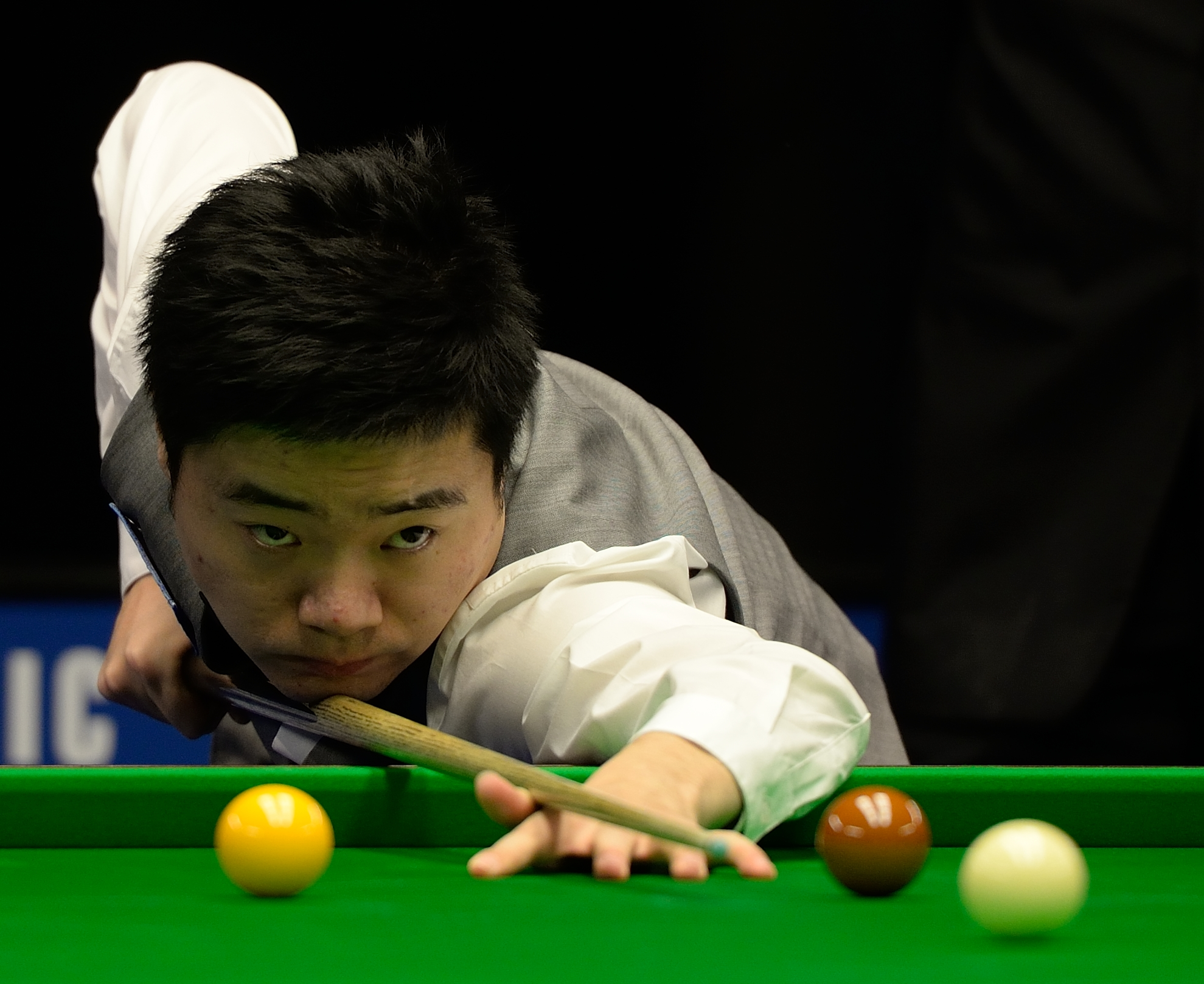
Ding Junhui at the 2015 German Masters

In the third round of the 2014 UK Championship, Ding fought from 1–5 down to send his match against James Cahill to a deciding frame. Ding recovered from needing three snookers in the tenth frame when world 100-ranked Cahill left a free ball. In the final frame, however, Ding missed a red when on a break of 32, which allowed Cahill a chance to knock him out, which he did. Despite the loss, Ding became the 11th world number one and first from Asia thanks to early eliminations of Mark Selby and Neil Robertson.

Ding held the top spot for a week before Robertson reclaimed it. Ding's poor form continued into 2015 as he was eliminated in the first round in six successive events: 3–6 to Joe Perry at the Masters; 4–5 to Ryan Day at the German Masters; 1–4 to world number 115 Lee Walker at the Welsh Open; 3–4 to Thepchaiya Un-Nooh at the Indian Open; 1–4 to Ricky Walden at the World Grand Prix; and 1–4 to Joe Perry at the 2015 Players Championship Grand Final. His form improved at the China Open as he defeated Marcus Campbell and Mark Davis—both 5–1—and Mark Williams 5–2 to reach the quarter-finals, where he beat John Higgins 5–4 on the colours. In Ding's second ranking-event semi-final of the season, he tied the scores at 5–5 after being 3–5 down to world number 56 Gary Wilson but lost the deciding frame.

In the opening rounds of the World Championship, Ding came back from 0–4 down against Mark Davis to win 10–7 and from 1–5 down against John Higgins to win 13–9. Ding lost the first six frames of his quarter-final match against Judd Trump and was beaten 13–4. He ended the season ranked world number four.

=== World Championship finalist (2015/2016) ===
In the quarter-finals of the Shanghai Masters, Ding lost 4–5 on the final black to Kyren Wilson. Ding won the Haining Open, defeating Ricky Walden 4–3 in the final. It was Ding's first title carrying ranking points in 16 months. In the main ranking events, he was knocked out in the second round of the International Championship and in the first round of the 2015 UK Championship by amateur player Adam Duffy. After losing to Duffy, Ding's press conference, during which he swore and criticised the conditions at the event, lasted less than one minute. He also failed to qualify for the German Masters and was knocked out in the first round of the Masters by Stuart Bingham.

Ding made the sixth 147 break of his career in the quarter-finals of the Welsh Open against Neil Robertson. Ding also made a 120 but these were the only frames he won and he was defeated 5–2. At the World Grand Prix, Ding beat Ben Woollaston 4–3, Peter Ebdon 4–0, and Thepchaiya Un-Nooh 4–3 to reach his first semi-final of the season against Shaun Murphy, which he lost 3–6. In the quarter-finals of the PTC Finals, Ding was defeated 4–2 by Barry Hawkins and he lost 1–5 to Lee Walker in the China Open qualifying. Ding, who had won five ranking events two seasons before, had left the world's top 16 and needed to qualify for the World Championship. He did so by winning three matches, conceding seven frames. He compiled his 400th century break of his career during this run. Ding beat Martin Gould by 10–8 and Judd Trump by 13–10 in the first and second rounds, respectively. He defeated Mark Williams 13–3 in the quarter-finals and Alan McManus 17–11 in the semi-final, during which he set a new record of seven century breaks, the most scored by a single player in a World Championship match at the Crucible Theatre. With this victory, Ding became the first Asian player to reach the final of the World Championship. He made 15 century breaks during the championship, one short of the record of 16 set by Stephen Hendry in the 2002 Championship. Ding lost the final 14–18 to Mark Selby. His end-of-season world ranking was nine.

=== First Six-red World Championship (2016/2017) ===
Ding won the 2016 Six-red World Championship, beating Stuart Bingham on the final black in the final by 8–7. Ding won his second Shanghai Masters title, defeating Mark Selby 10–6 in the final. It was the 12th ranking-tournament win of his career and he also became the first player to win the event twice. Ding defeated John Higgins 6–2 and Judd Trump 9–4 to reach the final of the International Championship, where he made a high break of 47 but Mark Selby won the last seven frames to beat him 10–1. In the semi-finals of the 2016 Champion of Champions, Ding made four centuries but was beaten 6–5 by Higgins. He lost 2–6 to Jamie Jones in the third round of the UK Championship. In the first round of the Players Championship, Ding recovered from being 0–4 down to Higgins to win 5–4. He then defeated Anthony Hamilton 5–2. Ding was 5–3 up against Marco Fu in the semi-finals but lost the match 5–6.

Ding was eliminated from the China Open in the quarter-finals after losing 1–5 to Kyren Wilson. At the World Championship, Ding beat Zhou Yuelong in the first round by 10–5 and, after leading 6–2 and 9–7, Liang Wenbo was leading Ding 13–11 in the second round. Ding made a 132 break to level the match and a 70 in the decider to progress with a score of 13–12. He played Ronnie O'Sullivan in the quarter-finals. Despite a career-record ten losses and two wins prior to the match, Ding won 13–10. In his semi-final with Mark Selby, Ding made two consecutive centuries to end the third session at 12–12. He won two frames from 16 to 13 down but missed a blue in the next frame and lost 15–17. Ding said his game would continue to improve as he had played with more confidence and aggression throughout the event. He ended the season ranked world number four.

=== World Cup win (2017/2018) ===
At the 2017 World Cup, Ding and China's number-two player, Liang Wenbo, defeated the English pair, Judd Trump and Barry Hawkins, in a deciding frame, winning the event 4–3. Ding led the Chinese team at the CVB Snooker Challenge, losing 9–26 to the British team. He lost 1–6 to the captain of the British team, Ronnie O'Sullivan. He then participated in the second China Championship but was defeated in a 5–0 whitewash to Alan McManus in the last 32 in a rematch of the semi-finals of the 2015 World Championship. As the defending Six-red World Champion, Ding lost 1–6 to Marco Fu in the last 16. Ding won the World Open, beating Luca Brecel 6–4 in the semi-finals and Kyren Wilson 10–3 in the final.

In 2018, Ding returned to form and reached the final of the World Grand Prix, where he won a 6–5 victory over Mark Selby in the semi-final. Ding struggled in the final, losing 3–10 to Ronnie O'Sullivan. He finished the season ranked world number six.

=== 2018/2019 ===
At the 2018 Six-red World Championship, Ding defeated Luca Brecel 7–6 in the semi-final, but lost 4–8 to Kyren Wilson in the final. At the 2018 Shanghai Masters, he won his second round match 6–3 against Mark Allen. He then beat Mark Selby 6–5 in the quarter-final, before losing 9–10 to Barry Hawkins in the semi-final.

In January 2019, Ding participated in the Masters, beating Jack Lisowski 6–1 in the first round and Luca Brecel 6–5 in the quarter-final. He lost 3–6 to Ronnie O'Sullivan in the semi-final. At the 2019 German Masters, Ding defeated Fergal O'Brien 5–3 in the last 32 and Xiao Guodong 5–4 in the last 16. However, he lost 3–5 to Duane Jones in the quarter-final. At the 2019 World Snooker Championship, Ding beat Anthony McGill 10–7 in the first round, but lost 9–13 to Judd Trump in the second round. His end-of-season world ranking was ten.

=== Third UK Championship (2019/2020) ===
In the 2019–20 season, Ding and compatriot Yan Bingtao participated in the World Cup. They beat Andy Lee and Cheung Ka Wai 4–0 in the quarter-finals, before losing 1–4 in the semi-finals to eventual winners John Higgins and Stephen Maguire. Ding reached the quarter-finals of the 2019 International Championship. At the 2019 Six-red World Championship, he reached the quarter-finals, losing to Gary Wilson after a 5–4 lead.

At the 2019 UK Championship, Ding beat Ronnie O'Sullivan 6–4 in the last 16. He defeated Liang Wenbo in the quarter-finals and Yan Bingtao in the semi-finals, both by 6–2. In the final, Ding beat Stephen Maguire 10–6, clinching his third UK title and his first since 2009. His win made him the fifth player to win the UK title three or more times, and it was his first ranking event win since 2017. Throughout the competition, Ding compiled ten century breaks, including four during the final. Following the event, his ranking increased seven spots to ninth. Due to the COVID-19 outbreak, Ding did not participate at another event until the 2020 World Snooker Championship. At the World Championship, Ding led Mark King 9–7 in their first round match before King won two 50-minute frames to level the match at 9–9 and send it into a decider. Ding won the deciding frame to progress 10–9 where he would face O'Sullivan in round two. After two very tight sessions, the players were tied at 4–4 and then 8–8 going into the third and final session. O'Sullivan proved too strong in the third session and Ding eventually lost the match 10–13.

=== Fall from the top 16 and return (2021–present) ===
Ding's best performances during the 2020–21 season were reaching the quarter-finals of four ranking tournaments as well as the quarter-finals of the Champion of Champions. His season ended with a 9–10 loss to Stuart Bingham in the first round of the 2021 World Snooker Championship. By late 2021, he had won just one ranking event in the previous four years, had missed many tournaments through choice or circumstance, and had struggled to practice while spending long stretches of time in China during the COVID-19 pandemic. After he lost 3–6 to world number 55 Sam Craigie in the last 64 of the 2021 UK Championship, he fell out of the top 16 in the world rankings, meaning that he did not qualify for the Masters for the first time since he was 18 years old in 2006. Speaking on BBC Two after Ding's loss to Craigie, seven-time world champion Stephen Hendry expressed concern about Ding's future in the sport: "I don't know what has happened to Ding. I don't know whether we have seen the best of him. He looks like he doesn't really care that much anymore... Any pressure balls he does not look like getting anymore. I don't know where Ding goes from here." After Ding lost 3–4 to world number 65 Zhang Anda in the qualifying round of the Scottish Open, pundit Alan McManus echoed Hendry's concerns, stating that Ding had "big problems to fix." In January 2022, Ding was ranked 30th in the world, was 68th on the one-year ranking list, and had fallen to become China's fourth-ranked player, behind Zhao Xintong, Yan Bingtao, and Zhou Yuelong.

Ding beat compatriot Tian Pengfei 6–4 and David Lilley 10–7 in the third and final qualifying rounds of the 2022 World Championship but lost 8–10 to Kyren Wilson in the first round, showing signs of frustration during the match. It was Ding's 16th consecutive year at the Crucible.

Before the 2022 UK Championship, Ding had fallen to 38th in the world rankings and had to win two qualifying matches to reach the tournament's main stage. However, Ding reached his first ranking final in three years with wins, including a 6–0 whitewash of world number one O'Sullivan in the quarter-finals. Ding lost 7–10 to Mark Allen in the final, despite having led 6–1. As runner-up, he advanced from 38th to 19th place in the world rankings. A return to form at the 2023 UK Championship saw Ding secure a 6–5 victory over Mark Williams in the quarter-final, which marked his return to the top 16 in the rankings and a spot at the 2024 Masters. Ding reached the final of that UK Championship, where he lost 7–10 to Ronnie O'Sullivan. One month later he faced O'Sullivan again in the first round of the Masters. He made a 147 break in the seventh frame of the match, accounting for two of the only four maximums during the 50-year history of the Masters. Ding, however, was ultimately beaten 3–6. Ding's 10–7 victory over Chris Wakelin in the final of the 2024 International Championship in China was his first ranking title win since 2019, and his fifteenth overall. At the 2025 Masters, Ding defeated Mark Williams 6–5 in the first round but was then beaten 3–6 by Judd Trump in the quarter-final. At the 2026 World Championship, Ding suffered a 9–13 second-round exit to Zhao Xintong.

==== The "Ding Junhui curse" ====
Beginning with the 2024 Players Championship in February 2024, 22 consecutive tournaments in which Ding participated featured a pattern that came to be known as the "Ding Junhui curse" or the "Ding curse". In these events, every player who defeated Ding lost in the next round. Stan Moody ended the so-called "curse" at the 2025 Wuhan Open in August 2025 when he defeated Ding in the last 64 and then beat Zhou Yuelong in the last 32.

== Achievements ==
Ding won three consecutive ranking tournaments in 2013. In Triple Crown events, he has reached the World Championship finals once, becoming the first Asian player to reach the final of the World Championship in 2016 before losing 14–18 to Mark Selby. He has reached the finals of the UK Championship five times, winning in 2005, 2009, 2019 and losing in 2022 and 2023. He has made two appearances in the Masters' final, losing in 2007 and winning in 2011.

During his professional playing career, Ding has compiled more than 600 competitive century breaks and seven 147 maximum breaks in professional competition. His first maximum break came at the 2007 Masters at the age of 19 years and seven months, making Ding the youngest player to have made a televised 147. Ding's second maximum break came at the 2008 UK Championship. His third came in the first round of the FFB Snooker Open in 2011. Two days later, he compiled his fourth maximum in a 4–1 victory against James Cahill. The fifth maximum came in his quarter-final of the 2013 PTC Finals against Mark Allen. On 19 February 2016, he made his sixth maximum against Neil Robertson in the quarter-finals of the Welsh Open. Ding made his 7th maximum against Ronnie O'Sullivan in the 2024 Masters.

== Personal life ==
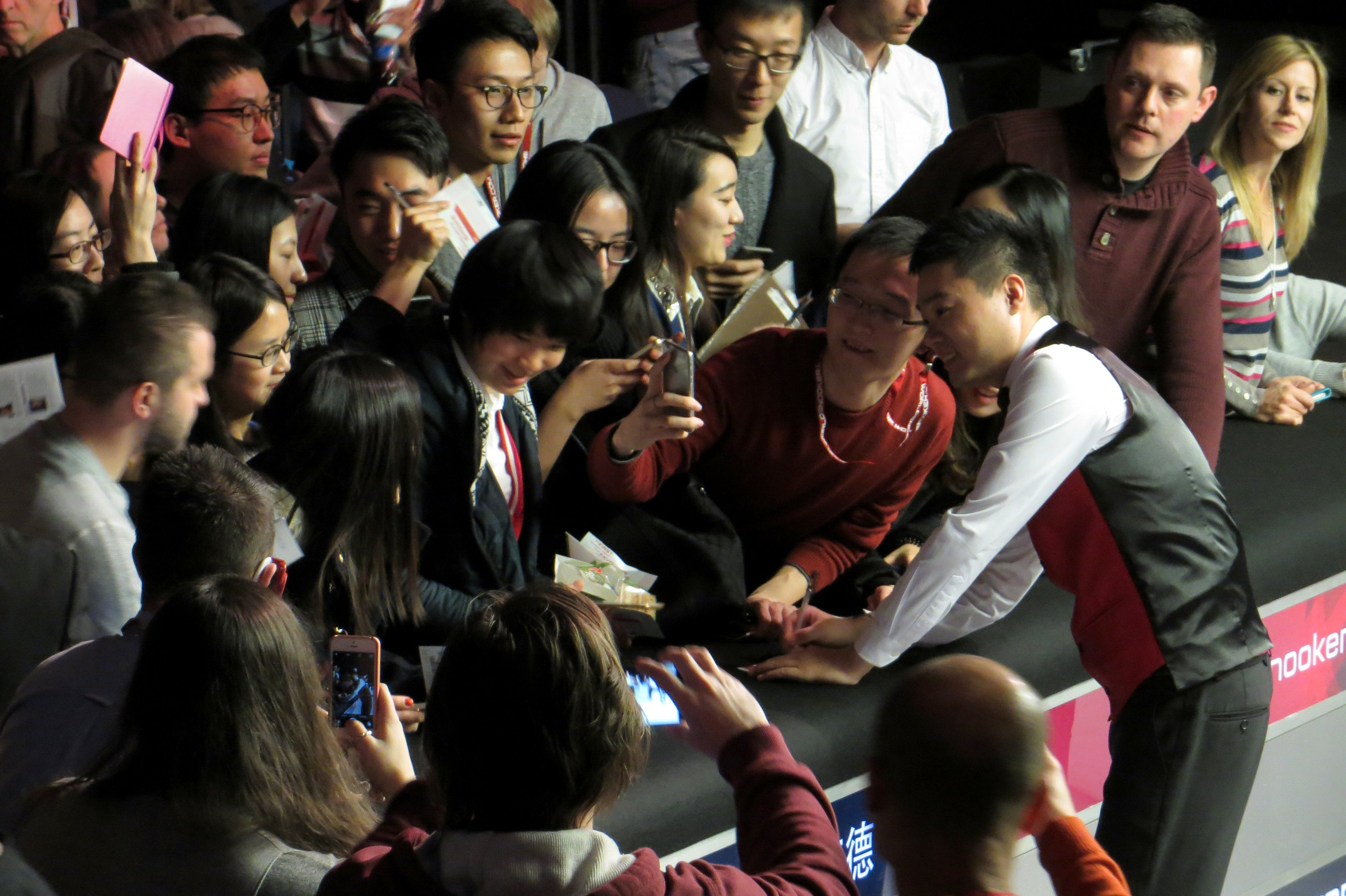
Ding interacting with fans in 2016

Ding enrolled at Shanghai Jiao Tong University in 2006 to study Business Administration and Management. He is a long-time resident of Sheffield, England. He practices at the English Institute of Sport in Sheffield. Ding is a patron of Sheffield United F.C.

In 2014, Ding married Zhang Yuanyuan, also known as Apple Zhang. The couple's daughter was born in August 2018. Ding's mother, Chen Xijuan, died from cancer in January 2017, aged 55.

== In popular culture ==
A 26-episode cartoon series, Dragon Ball No.1, by Beijing-based D5 Studio, which is based on Ding's growth from a shy boy to a snooker star, was broadcast on Chinese television in 2010.

== Performance and rankings timeline ==
Tournaments	2001/ 02	2003/ 04		2004/ 05	2005/ 06	2006/ 07	2007/ 08	2008/ 09	2009/ 10	2010/ 11	2011/ 12	2012/ 13	2013/ 14	2014/ 15	2015/ 16	2016/ 17	2017/ 18	2018/ 19	2019/ 20	2020/ 21	2021/ 22	2022/ 23	2023/ 24	2024/ 25	2025/ 26	2026/ 27
Rankings (Note: It shows the ranking at the beginning of the season)	(Note: He was an amateur)	(Note: New players on the Main Tour do not have a ranking)		76	62	27	9	11	13	5	4	11	10	2	4	9	4	6	10	12	8	32	16	8	6	15
Ranking tournaments
Championship League	Tournament Not Held						Non-Ranking Event													A	A	A	A	A	A	A
China Open	WR	NH		W	SF	1R	2R	1R	F	SF	SF	1R	W	SF	LQ	QF	3R	1R	Tournament Not Held							1R
Wuhan Open	Tournament Not Held																						1R	3R	1R	LQ
British Open	A	LQ		3R	Tournament Not Held																A	2R	3R	LQ	A	2R
English Open	Tournament Not Held															3R	2R	A	1R	4R	3R	2R	QF	A	3R	SF
Shenzhen Open (Note: The event was called the Xi'an Grand Prix (2024/2025–2025/2026))	Tournament Not Held																							LQ	QF	LQ
Northern Ireland Open	Tournament Not Held															1R	A	A	1R	QF	A	1R	A	A	A	A
International Championship	Tournament Not Held											2R	W	LQ	2R	F	1R	3R	QF	Not Held			QF	W	3R	QF
UK Championship	A	LQ		1R	W	QF	QF	2R	W	2R	QF	1R	4R	3R	1R	3R	1R	4R	W	2R	2R	F	F	2R	QF	
Shoot Out	Tournament Not Held									Non-Ranking Event						A	A	A	A	A	WD	1R	A	A	A	
Scottish Open (Note: The event was called the Players Championship (2003/2004))	A	2R		Tournament Not Held								MR	Not Held			A	3R	4R	3R	QF	LQ	2R	2R	3R	A	
German Masters	Tournament Not Held									QF	1R	2R	W	1R	LQ	A	QF	QF	1R	QF	LQ	LQ	LQ	WD	A	
Welsh Open	A	LQ		1R	LQ	1R	3R	2R	1R	QF	W	SF	F	1R	QF	1R	2R	4R	4R	2R	2R	1R	1R	A	A	
World Grand Prix	Tournament Not Held													NR	SF	2R	F	2R	1R	2R	DNQ	2R	SF	1R	1R	
Players Championship (Note: The event was called the Players Tour Championship Grand Final (2010/2011–2015/2016))	Tournament Not Held									DNQ	2R	W	1R	1R	QF	SF	QF	DNQ	1R	1R	DNQ	1R	1R	1R	DNQ	
World Open (Note: The event was called the LG Cup (2001/2002 and 2003/2004) and the Grand Prix (2004/2005–2009/2010))	A	LQ		LQ	LQ	RR	RR	QF	F	QF	1R	QF	3R	Not Held		2R	W	2R	3R	Not Held			F	3R	LQ	
Tour Championship	Tournament Not Held																	DNQ	WD	DNQ	DNQ	SF	QF	SF	DNQ	
World Championship	A	LQ		LQ	LQ	1R	2R	2R	2R	SF	1R	QF	1R	QF	F	SF	QF	2R	2R	1R	1R	1R	1R	2R	2R	
Non-ranking tournaments
Shanghai Masters	Tournament Not Held						Ranking Event											SF	2R	Not Held			2R	QF	QF	2R
Champion of Champions	Tournament Not Held												QF	SF	A	SF	1R	QF	A	QF	1R	A	QF	1R	A	
Riyadh Season Championship (Note: The event was called the World Masters of Snooker (2023/2024))	Tournament Not Held																						2R	QF	2R	
The Masters	A	1R		QF	LQ	F	QF	QF	1R	W	1R	1R	1R	1R	1R	QF	1R	SF	1R	1R	A	A	1R	QF	1R	
Championship League	Tournament Not Held						A	RR	RR	RR	W	SF	A	A	A	A	A	RR	A	A	RR	A	A	A	A	
Former ranking tournaments
Irish Masters	NR	LQ		LQ	NH	NR	Tournament Not Held																			
Northern Ireland Trophy	Not Held				NR	W	3R	2R	Tournament Not Held																	
Wuxi Classic (Note: The event was called the Jiangsu Classic (2008/2009–2009/2010))	Tournament Not Held							Non-Ranking Event				1R	2R	LQ	Tournament Not Held											
Shanghai Masters	Tournament Not Held						2R	1R	QF	2R	1R	1R	W	SF	QF	W	WD	Non-Ranking		Not Held			Non-Ranking Event			
Indian Open	Tournament Not Held												W	1R	NH	A	A	A	Tournament Not Held							
China Championship	Tournament Not Held															NR	2R	2R	1R	Tournament Not Held						
Turkish Masters	Tournament Not Held																				SF	Tournament Not Held				
Gibraltar Open	Tournament Not Held														MR	2R	WD	A	A	1R	QF	Tournament Not Held				
WST Classic	Tournament Not Held																					1R	Tournament Not Held			
European Masters (Note: The event was called the European Open (2001/2002 and 2003/2004) and the Malta Cup (2004/2005–2007/2008))	A	LQ		LQ	LQ	1R	NR	Tournament Not Held								WD	A	A	2R	QF	A	A	A	Not Held		
Saudi Arabia Masters	Tournament Not Held																							5R	6R	NH
Former non-ranking tournaments
World Champions v Asia Stars	Not Held			SF	Tournament Not Held																					
Northern Ireland Trophy	Not Held				1R	Ranking Event			Tournament Not Held																	
Euro-Asia Masters Challenge	NH	RR	SF	Not Held			RR	Tournament Not Held																		
Malta Cup	Ranking Event						SF	Tournament Not Held								Ranking Event										
Huangshan Cup	Tournament Not Held						SF	Tournament Not Held																		
World Series Warsaw	Tournament Not Held							W	Tournament Not Held																	
World Series Moscow	Tournament Not Held							F	Tournament Not Held																	
World Series Grand Final	Tournament Not Held							QF	Tournament Not Held																	
Hainan Classic	Tournament Not Held									RR	Tournament Not Held															
Wuxi Classic	Tournament Not Held							W	F	F	SF	Ranking Event			Tournament Not Held											
Power Snooker	Tournament Not Held									F	1R	Tournament Not Held														
Premier League Snooker	A	A		A	SF	RR	SF	RR	A	RR	F	RR	Tournament Not Held													
World Grand Prix	Tournament Not Held													1R	Ranking Event											
Shoot Out	Tournament Not Held									1R	1R	1R	A	A	A	Ranking Event										
China Championship	Tournament Not Held															1R	Ranking Event			Tournament Not Held						
Six-red World Championship (Note: The event was called the Six-red Snooker International (2008/2009) and the Six-red World Grand Prix (2009/2010))	Tournament Not Held							A	A	A	NH	A	A	A	2R	W	2R	F	QF	Not Held		W	Tournament Not Held			

Performance Table Legend
LQ	lost in the qualifying draw	#R	lost in the early rounds of the tournament (WR = Wildcard round, RR = Round robin)	QF	lost in the quarter-finals
SF	lost in the semi-finals	F	lost in the final	W	won the tournament
DNQ	did not qualify for the tournament	A	did not participate in the tournament	WD	withdrew from the tournament

NH / Not Held	means an event was not held.
NR / Non-Ranking Event	means an event is/was no longer a ranking event.
R / Ranking Event	means an event is/was a ranking event.
MR / Minor-Ranking Event	means an event is/was a minor-ranking event.
PA / Pro-am Event	means an event is/was a pro-am event.

== Career finals ==
=== Ranking finals: 24 (15 titles) ===
Legend
World Championship (0–1)
UK Championship (3–2)
Other (12–6)

Outcome	No.	Year	Championship	Opponent in the final	Score
Winner	1.	2005	China Open	(Scotland) Stephen Hendry	9–5
Winner	2.	2005	UK Championship	(England) Steve Davis	10–6
Winner	3.	2006	Northern Ireland Trophy	(England) Ronnie O'Sullivan	9–6
Runner-up	1.	2009	Grand Prix	(Australia) Neil Robertson	4–9
Winner	4.	2009	UK Championship (2)	(Scotland) John Higgins	10–8
Runner-up	2.	2010	China Open	(Wales) Mark Williams	6–10
Winner	5.	2012	Welsh Open	(England) Mark Selby	9–6
Winner	6.	2013	Players Tour Championship Finals	(Australia) Neil Robertson	4–3
Winner	7.	2013	Shanghai Masters	(China) Xiao Guodong	10–6
Winner	8.	2013	Indian Open	(India) Aditya Mehta	5–0
Winner	9.	2013	International Championship	(Hong Kong) Marco Fu	10–9
Winner	10.	2014	German Masters	(England) Judd Trump	9–5
Runner-up	3.	2014	Welsh Open	(England) Ronnie O'Sullivan	3–9
Winner	11.	2014	China Open (2)	(Australia) Neil Robertson	10–5
Runner-up	4.	2016	World Snooker Championship	(England) Mark Selby	14–18
Winner	12.	2016	Shanghai Masters (2)	(England) Mark Selby	10–6
Runner-up	5.	2016	International Championship	(England) Mark Selby	1–10
Winner	13.	2017	World Open	(England) Kyren Wilson	10–3
Runner-up	6.	2018	World Grand Prix	(England) Ronnie O'Sullivan	3–10
Winner	14.	2019	UK Championship (3)	(Scotland) Stephen Maguire	10–6
Runner-up	7.	2022	UK Championship	(Northern Ireland) Mark Allen	7–10
Runner-up	8.	2023	UK Championship (2)	(England) Ronnie O'Sullivan	7–10
Runner-up	9.	2024	World Open (2)	(England) Judd Trump	4–10
Winner	15.	2024	International Championship (2)	(England) Chris Wakelin	10–7

=== Minor-ranking finals: 7 (4 titles) ===
Outcome	No.	Year	Championship	Opponent in the final	Score
Winner	1.	2010	Players Tour Championship – Event 5	(Wales) Jamie Jones	4–1
Runner-up	1.	2011	Players Tour Championship – Event 2	(England) Judd Trump	0–4
Runner-up	2.	2012	Asian Players Tour Championship – Event 2	(England) Stephen Lee	0–4
Winner	2.	2012	Scottish Open	(Scotland) Anthony McGill	4–2
Runner-up	3.	2013	Ruhr Open	(Northern Ireland) Mark Allen	1–4
Winner	3.	2014	Yixing Open	(England) Michael Holt	4–2
Winner	4.	2015	Haining Open	(England) Ricky Walden	4–3

=== Non-ranking finals: 14 (6 titles) ===
Legend
The Masters (1–1)
Premier League (0–1)
Other (5–6)

Outcome	No.	Year	Championship	Opponent in the final	Score
Runner-up	1.	2005	World Games	(Northern Ireland) Gerard Greene	3–4
Runner-up	2.	2007	The Masters	(England) Ronnie O'Sullivan	3–10
Winner	1.	2008	Jiangsu Classic	(England) Mark Selby	6–5
Winner	2.	2008	World Series of Snooker Warsaw	(Republic of Ireland) Ken Doherty	6–4
Runner-up	3.	2008	World Series of Snooker Moscow	(Scotland) John Higgins	0–5
Runner-up	4.	2009	Jiangsu Classic	(Northern Ireland) Mark Allen	0–6
Runner-up	5.	2010	Wuxi Classic (2)	(England) Shaun Murphy	8–9
Runner-up	6.	2010	Power Snooker	(England) Ronnie O'Sullivan	258–572 (points)
Winner	3.	2011	The Masters	(Hong Kong) Marco Fu	10–4
Runner-up	7.	2011	Premier League	(England) Ronnie O'Sullivan	1–7
Winner	4.	2012	Championship League	(England) Judd Trump	3–1
Winner	5.	2016	Six-red World Championship	(England) Stuart Bingham	8–7
Runner-up	8.	2018	Six-red World Championship	(England) Kyren Wilson	4–8
Winner	6.	2023	Six-red World Championship (2)	(Thailand) Thepchaiya Un-Nooh	8–6

=== Team finals: 3 (2 titles) ===
Outcome	No.	Year	Championship	Team	Opponent in the final	Score
Winner	1.	2011	World Cup	China	Northern Ireland	4–2
Winner	2.	2017	World Cup (2)	China A	England	4–3
Runner-up	1.	2017	CVB Snooker Challenge	China	Great Britain	9–26

=== Pro-am finals: 4 (2 titles) ===
Outcome	No.	Year	Championship	Opponent in the final	Score
Winner	1.	2002	Asian Games	(Thailand) Supoj Saenla	3–1
Winner	2.	2006	Asian Games (2)	(China) Liang Wenbo	4–2
Runner-up	1.	2010	Asian Games	(Hong Kong) Marco Fu	2–4
Runner-up	2.	2013	Asian Indoor and Martial Arts Games	(China) Cao Yupeng	2–4

=== Amateur finals: 3 (3 titles) ===
Outcome	No.	Year	Championship	Opponent in the final	Score
Winner	1.	2002	ACBS Asian Under-21 Championship	(Thailand) Pramual Janthad	6–2
Winner	2.	2002	IBSF World Under-21 Championship	(Wales) David John	11–9
Winner	3.	2002	ACBS Asian Championship	(Singapore) Keith E. Boon	8–1
