= 2011 Power Snooker Masters Trophy =

Tournament information
- Dates: 19–20 November 2011
- Venue: Event City, Trafford Centre
- City: Manchester
- Country: United Kingdom
- Organisation: Power Snooker Group
- Format: Power Snooker
- Winner's share: £25,000

Final
- Champion: (England) Martin Gould
- Runner-up: (England) Ronnie O'Sullivan
- Score: 286–258 points (Unlimited Racks)

The 2011 Power Snooker Masters Trophy was a cue sports tournament that took place between 19 and 20 November 2011 at Event City, Trafford Centre, Manchester. Martin Gould beat Ronnie O'Sullivan 286–258 on points in a 30-minute time based unlimited racks final. Gould earned £25,000 as the winner while O'Sullivan received £12,000 as the runner-up. After the event it was revealed that O'Sullivan also received £25,000 appearance money, whereas the other top 16 players were only guaranteed £3,000 in prize money. When asked about this, Neil Robertson said: "If a tournament needs one player for it to happen, [it] shouldn't be on at all...".

== Main draw ==
All times are GMT.

Round of 16
19 November 2011, 13:10
(England) Mark Selby	243
(Wales) Matthew Stevens	196
19 November 2011, 14:00
(Scotland) John Higgins	177
(Northern Ireland) Mark Allen	255
19 November 2011, 15:00
(England) Judd Trump	229
(England) Martin Gould	332
19 November 2011, 16:00
(England) Shaun Murphy	112
(England) Stuart Bingham	376
19 November 2011, 18:10
(Wales) Mark Williams	211
(England) Stephen Lee	228
19 November 2011, 19:00
(Australia) Neil Robertson	238
(Scotland) Stephen Maguire	174
19 November 2011, 20:00
(England) Ali Carter	238
(England) Ronnie O'Sullivan	335
19 November 2011, 21:00
(China) Ding Junhui	182
(Scotland) Graeme Dott	288

Quarter-finals
20 November 2011, 13:10
(England) Mark Selby	398
(Northern Ireland) Mark Allen	56
20 November 2011, 14:00
(England) Martin Gould	247
(England) Stuart Bingham	180
20 November 2011, 15:00
(England) Stephen Lee	125
(Australia) Neil Robertson	271
20 November 2011, 16:00
(England) Ronnie O'Sullivan	185
(Scotland) Graeme Dott	182

Semi-finals
20 November 2011, 18:00
(England) Mark Selby	246
(England) Martin Gould	253
20 November 2011, 19:00
(Australia) Neil Robertson	157
(England) Ronnie O'Sullivan	519

Final
20 November 2011, 20:00
(England) Martin Gould	286
(England) Ronnie O'Sullivan	258
