= Players Tour Championship 2010/2011 – Event 5 =

Players Tour Championship 2010/2011 Event 5
Tournament information
- Dates: 7–10 October 2010
- Venue: World Snooker Academy
- City: Sheffield
- Country: England
- Organisation: World Snooker
- Format: Minor-ranking event
- Total prize fund: £50,000
- Winner's share: £10,000
- Highest break: Jamie Jones (WAL) (143)

Final
- Champion: Ding Junhui (CHN)
- Runner-up: Jamie Jones (WAL)
- Score: 4–1

The Players Tour Championship 2010/2011 – Event 5 (also known as Star Xing Pai Players Tour Championship 2010/2011 – Event 5 for sponsorship purposes) was a professional minor-ranking snooker tournament that took place between 7–10 October 2010 at the World Snooker Academy in Sheffield, England.

Ding Junhui won in the final 4–1 against Jamie Jones.

== Prize fund and ranking points ==
The breakdown of prize money and ranking points of the event is shown below:

	Prize fund	Ranking points^{1}
Winner	£10,000	2,000
Runner Up	£5,000	1,600
Semi-finalist	£2,500	1,280
Quarter-finalist	£1,500	1,000
Last 16	£1,000	760
Last 32	£600	560
Last 64	£200	360
Total	£50,000	–

- ^{1} Only professional players can earn ranking points.

== Main draw ==
=== Preliminary rounds ===
==== Round 1 ====
Best of 7 frames

(Belgium) Hans Blanckaert	1–4	(England) Mark Miller

==== Round 2 ====
Best of 7 frames

(England) Chris Norbury	1–4	(England) Ben Harrison
(Singapore) Marvin Lim	1–4	(China) Tian Pengfei
(Germany) Lasse Münstermann	w/o–w/d	(England) Jamie Walker
(England) Craig Steadman	w/o–w/d	(India) Lucky Vatnani
(England) Allan Taylor	4–1	(India) David Singh
(England) Marc Harman	0–4	(England) Jeff Cundy
(England) Ian Glover	2–4	(India) Aditya Mehta
(Wales) Kishan Hirani	4–1	(United Arab Emirates) Salim Ali
(England) Steve Judd	4–0	(England) Daniel Skingle
(England) Rogelio Esteiro	1–4	(England) Nick Jennings
(Republic of Ireland) Colm Gilcreest	1–4	(Republic of Ireland) Martin McCrudden
(Saudi Arabia) Ahmed Aseeri	4–1	(England) Christopher Keogan
(Singapore) Tommy Ang	4–3	(England) Shaun Parkes
(England) James Hill	w/o–w/d	(United Arab Emirates) Mohammed Shehab
(England) James Murdoch	0–4	(England) John Whitty
(Pakistan) Sharrukh Nasir	0–4	(England) Mark Miller

(England) Adam Duffy	w/o–w/d	(England) Lee Farebrother
(England) Michael Wild	3–4	(Republic of Ireland) John Sutton
(England) Danny Douane	4–0	(England) Rock Hui
(United Arab Emirates) Eissa Alsayed	0–4	(England) Tony Knowles
(England) Stephen Ormerod	3–4	(England) James McGouran
(England) Andrew Norman	2–4	(England) Andy Lee
(England) Joel Walker	1–4	(Republic of Ireland) Leo Fernandez
(Wales) Jamie Clarke	4–0	(England) Matthew Day
(England) Andrew Milliard	1–4	(England) Charlie Walters
(England) Mitchell Mann	1–4	(England) Martin O'Donnell
(England) Ian Burns	2–4	(Belgium) Luca Brecel
(England) Gareth Green	4–2	(United Arab Emirates) Mohammed Joker
(England) Robbie Williams	1–4	(England) Sam Baird
(England) Ian Stark	0–4	(England) David Grace
(England) Stephen Groves	0–4	(China) Chen Zhe
(England) Sam Harvey	0–4	(England) Stuart Carrington

=== Main rounds ===
==== Top half ====
===== Section 1 =====
Last 128; Best of 7 frames
(England) Barry Pinches	1
(England) Ben Harrison	4
(Northern Ireland) Joe Swail	1
(Northern Ireland) Mark Allen	4
(England) Peter Lines	2
(China) Tian Pengfei	4
(England) Rory McLeod	4
(Thailand) Thanawat Thirapongpaiboon	3
(England) Mark Joyce	4
(Germany) Lasse Münstermann	2
(China) Xiao Guodong	4
(England) Matthew Couch	0
(England) Anthony Hamilton	1
(England) Craig Steadman	4
(England) Kyren Wilson	3
(Scotland) James McBain	4

Last 64; Best of 7 frames
(England) Ben Harrison	2
(Northern Ireland) Mark Allen	4
(China) Tian Pengfei	2
(England) Rory McLeod	4
(England) Mark Joyce	4
(China) Xiao Guodong	2
(England) Craig Steadman	3
(Scotland) James McBain	4

Last 32; Best of 7 frames
(Northern Ireland) Mark Allen	2
(England) Rory McLeod	4
(England) Mark Joyce	4
(Scotland) James McBain	2

Last 16; Best of 7 frames
(England) Rory McLeod	4
(England) Mark Joyce	3

===== Section 2 =====
Last 128; Best of 7 frames
(England) Mike Dunn	4
(England) David Gilbert	2
(England) Michael Wasley	2
(England) Simon Bedford	4
(England) Liam Highfield	0
(England) Allan Taylor	4
(China) Liu Chuang	4
(England) Jeff Cundy	3
(Scotland) Stephen Maguire	0
(India) Aditya Mehta	4
(Republic of Ireland) Fergal O'Brien	3
(Norway) Kurt Maflin	4
(England) Joe Jogia	4
(Wales) Ryan Day	1
(England) Ricky Walden	4
(Wales) Jak Jones	1

Last 64; Best of 7 frames
(England) Mike Dunn	0
(England) Simon Bedford	4
(England) Allan Taylor	4
(China) Liu Chuang	1
(India) Aditya Mehta	4
(Norway) Kurt Maflin	2
(England) Joe Jogia	1
(England) Ricky Walden	4

Last 32; Best of 7 frames
(England) Simon Bedford	3
(England) Allan Taylor	4
(India) Aditya Mehta	0
(England) Ricky Walden	4

Last 16; Best of 7 frames
(England) Allan Taylor	3
(England) Ricky Walden	4

===== Section 3 =====
Last 128; Best of 7 frames
(Scotland) Marcus Campbell	4
(Wales) Kishan Hirani	1
(England) Adam Wicheard	4
(England) Steve Judd	0
(England) Martin Gould	4
(Republic of Ireland) Joe Delaney	0
(Wales) Michael White	3
(Thailand) Noppon Saengkham	4
(Northern Ireland) Gerard Greene	4
(England) Nick Jennings	1
(England) Joe Perry	4
(Republic of Ireland) Martin McCrudden	0
(China) Liu Song	4
(Republic of Ireland) David Morris	2
(Wales) Jamie Jones	4
(Germany) Patrick Einsle	1

Last 64; Best of 7 frames
(Scotland) Marcus Campbell	4
(England) Adam Wicheard	2
(England) Martin Gould	4
(Thailand) Noppon Saengkham	1
(Northern Ireland) Gerard Greene	4
(England) Joe Perry	0
(China) Liu Song	0
(Wales) Jamie Jones	4

Last 32; Best of 7 frames
(Scotland) Marcus Campbell	3
(England) Martin Gould	4
(Northern Ireland) Gerard Greene	3
(Wales) Jamie Jones	4

Last 16; Best of 7 frames
(England) Martin Gould	0
(Wales) Jamie Jones	4

===== Section 4 =====
Last 128; Best of 7 frames
(Wales) Daniel Wells	4
(Saudi Arabia) Ahmed Aseeri	3
(England) Dave Harold	2
(Northern Ireland) Patrick Wallace	4
(England) Jamie Cope	4
(Singapore) Tommy Ang	0
(Belgium) Bjorn Haneveer	4
(England) James Hill	0
(China) Liang Wenbo	4
(England) John Whitty	2
(England) Jack Lisowski	4
(China) Zhang Anda	1
(Wales) Mark Williams	4
(England) Mark Miller	0
(Brazil) Igor Figueiredo	0
(Thailand) Issara Kachaiwong	4

Last 64; Best of 7 frames
(Wales) Daniel Wells	1
(Northern Ireland) Patrick Wallace	4
(England) Jamie Cope	4
(Belgium) Bjorn Haneveer	3
(China) Liang Wenbo	4
(England) Jack Lisowski	3
(Wales) Mark Williams	4
(Thailand) Issara Kachaiwong	1

Last 32; Best of 7 frames
(Northern Ireland) Patrick Wallace	4
(England) Jamie Cope	2
(China) Liang Wenbo	1
(Wales) Mark Williams	4

Last 16; Best of 7 frames
(Northern Ireland) Patrick Wallace	4
(Wales) Mark Williams	1

==== Bottom half ====
===== Section 5 =====
Last 128; Best of 7 frames
(England) Judd Trump	1
(England) Adam Duffy	4
(Scotland) Alan McManus	4
(Republic of Ireland) Ken Doherty	3
(England) Adrian Gunnell	w/o
(Republic of Ireland) John Sutton	w/d
(England) Peter Ebdon	4
(England) Danny Douane	0
(Malta) Tony Drago	3
(China) Ding Junhui	4
(England) Stuart Bingham	4
(England) Tony Knowles	1
(England) Stephen Lee	w/o
(Republic of Ireland) Michael Judge	w/d
(England) Steve Davis	4
(England) James McGouran	0

Last 64; Best of 7 frames
(England) Adam Duffy	4
(Scotland) Alan McManus	2
(England) Adrian Gunnell	1
(England) Peter Ebdon	4
(China) Ding Junhui	4
(England) Stuart Bingham	1
(England) Stephen Lee	4
(England) Steve Davis	0

Last 32; Best of 7 frames
(England) Adam Duffy	2
(England) Peter Ebdon	4
(China) Ding Junhui	4
(England) Stephen Lee	3

Last 16; Best of 7 frames
(England) Peter Ebdon	3
(China) Ding Junhui	4

===== Section 6 =====
Last 128; Best of 7 frames
(Wales) Dominic Dale	4
(Thailand) James Wattana	1
(England) Stuart Pettman	0
(England) Andy Lee	4
(England) Ian McCulloch	0
(England) Kuldesh Johal	4
(England) Alfie Burden	1
(Republic of Ireland) Leo Fernandez	4
(Wales) Matthew Stevens	4
(Scotland) Stephen Hendry	1
(England) Jimmy White	4
(Wales) Jamie Clarke	1
(Scotland) Anthony McGill	4
(England) Charlie Walters	0
(England) Shaun Murphy	4
(England) Martin O'Donnell	3

Last 64; Best of 7 frames
(Wales) Dominic Dale	4
(England) Andy Lee	0
(England) Kuldesh Johal	3
(Republic of Ireland) Leo Fernandez	4
(Wales) Matthew Stevens	4
(England) Jimmy White	0
(Scotland) Anthony McGill	1
(England) Shaun Murphy	4

Last 32; Best of 7 frames
(Wales) Dominic Dale	4
(Republic of Ireland) Leo Fernandez	0
(Wales) Matthew Stevens	4
(England) Shaun Murphy	3

Last 16; Best of 7 frames
(Wales) Dominic Dale	4
(Wales) Matthew Stevens	3

===== Section 7 =====
Last 128; Best of 7 frames
(England) Paul Davison	2
(Belgium) Luca Brecel	4
(England) Justin Astley	4
(England) Reanne Evans	1
(Hong Kong) Marco Fu	4
(England) Gareth Green	0
(England) Matthew Selt	1
(England) Michael Holt	4
(England) Jimmy Robertson	4
(England) Sam Baird	3
(England) Mark Davis	4
(England) Ali Carter	2
(England) Ben Woollaston	4
(England) Jimmy Michie	1
(England) Nigel Bond	4
(England) Robert Milkins	3

Last 64; Best of 7 frames
(Belgium) Luca Brecel	4
(England) Justin Astley	1
(Hong Kong) Marco Fu	4
(England) Michael Holt	0
(England) Jimmy Robertson	4
(England) Mark Davis	0
(England) Ben Woollaston	4
(England) Nigel Bond	3

Last 32; Best of 7 frames
(Belgium) Luca Brecel	1
(Hong Kong) Marco Fu	4
(England) Jimmy Robertson	4
(England) Ben Woollaston	3

Last 16; Best of 7 frames
(Hong Kong) Marco Fu	4
(England) Jimmy Robertson	3

===== Section 8 =====
Last 128; Best of 7 frames
(England) Andy Hicks	4
(England) David Grace	0
(England) Mark King	2
(Australia) Neil Robertson	4
(England) Ronnie O'Sullivan	w/d
(Northern Ireland) Dermot McGlinchey	w/o
(Wales) Andrew Pagett	0
(Scotland) Graeme Dott	4
(England) Andrew Higginson	4
(China) Chen Zhe	2
(England) Barry Hawkins	4
(England) Jamie O'Neill	2
(England) Tom Ford	2
(England) Rod Lawler	4
(England) Mark Selby	4
(England) Stuart Carrington	0

Last 64; Best of 7 frames
(England) Andy Hicks	1
(Australia) Neil Robertson	4
(Northern Ireland) Dermot McGlinchey	1
(Scotland) Graeme Dott	4
(England) Andrew Higginson	4
(England) Barry Hawkins	3
(England) Rod Lawler	2
(England) Mark Selby	4

Last 32; Best of 7 frames
(Australia) Neil Robertson	4
(Scotland) Graeme Dott	2
(England) Andrew Higginson	4
(England) Mark Selby	0

Last 16; Best of 7 frames
(Australia) Neil Robertson	2
(England) Andrew Higginson	4

==== Finals ====
Quarter-finals; Best of 7 frames		Semi-finals; Best of 7 frames		Final; Best of 7 frames
(England) Rory McLeod	2
(England) Ricky Walden	4	(England) Ricky Walden	2
(Wales) Jamie Jones	4	(Wales) Jamie Jones	4
(Northern Ireland) Patrick Wallace	3			(Wales) Jamie Jones	1
(China) Ding Junhui	4			(China) Ding Junhui	4
(Wales) Dominic Dale	2	(China) Ding Junhui	4
(Hong Kong) Marco Fu	0	(England) Andrew Higginson	1
(England) Andrew Higginson	4

== Century breaks ==
- 143 – Jamie Jones
- 136 – Tony Drago
- 135, 102 – Ricky Walden
- 135 – Jamie Cope
- 134 – Noppon Saengkham
- 133 – Jimmy Robertson
- 131 – Patrick Wallace
- 129 – Graeme Dott
- 125, 104 – Andrew Higginson
- 119, 113 – Mark Selby
- 117 – Tian Pengfei
- 116 – Kuldesh Johal
- 116 – Ding Junhui
- 115, 114, 112 – Marco Fu
- 115 – Alan McManus
- 115 – Matthew Stevens
- 112, 100 – Dominic Dale
- 110 – Robert Milkins
- 109 – Anthony McGill
- 106 – Andy Hicks
- 106 – Michael Holt
- 104, 103 – Barry Hawkins
- 104 – Gerard Greene
- 103 – Justin Astley
- 102 – Marcus Campbell
- 102 – Rory McLeod
- 102 – Mark Joyce
- 101 – Luca Brecel
