= Patricia Murphy (referee) =

Professional snooker referee

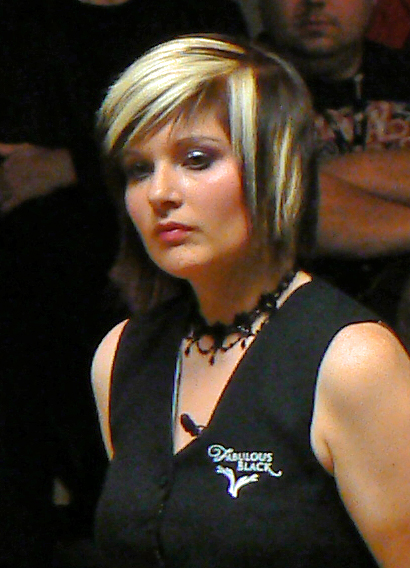
- At the World Series of Snooker Warsaw

Personal information
- Born: 1981 (age 44–45) County Clare, Ireland

Sport
- Country: Ireland
- Sport: Snooker
- Professional: 2004–2015

Patricia Murphy is an Irish snooker and pool referee, notable for becoming only the second woman to be a referee on the sports main tour. Also known as Patricia Roberts.

== Life ==
Born in County Clare in Ireland, Murphy moved to the UK. She qualified in 2004 to referee on the professional snooker tour, and become the sport's second female referee, after Michaela Tabb in 1997. Her first official event was the 2005 UK Championship in York. Her television debut was the 2006 Junior Snooker Pot Black competition.

Murphy was selected to be a referee at the 2009 World Pool Masters in Las Vegas. She was also chosen as one of the referees for the Power Snooker tournament at London's IndigO2 arena on 30 October 2010 with Michaela Tabb, a Scot.

== Personal life ==
Murphy resides in Stamford, United Kingdom, with her partner, professional snooker player Lewis Roberts.
