= Power Snooker =

Variant of snooker

Power Snooker is a cue sport, a variant format of snooker. The sport was conceived in 2010. Its concept was derived from the game of snooker and the game of nine-ball pool, with racks being used and the nine red balls which featured one red and white striped power ball set up in a diamond formation as in nine-ball pool. It was first played in October 2010.

The first tournament was played in London in the United Kingdom.

Barry Hearn, the promoter of World Snooker, stated that Power Snooker is "designed to be fast and very exciting with its power zones and double points scoring". Players competed in time-limited matches based on total points scored, instead of the number of racks won. Power Snooker uses nine red balls which includes one red and white striped power ball. When the power ball is potted a two-minute power play starts and all points scored during this period count as double. The balls are continually re-racked at the end of each rack until the end of the match. Total match play lasts for a fixed 30 minutes, with the winner being the player who has scored the most points overall, irrespective of racks played or won. A 20-second shot clock is imposed on each shot, while additional rules also included a power ball, power plays and power zones which included the scoring of double points, quadruple points and the awarding of an extra 50 bonus points if a century break was made. A time foul carried a penalty of 20 points. if a player committed a foul during a power play or in the power zone the penalty was doubled.

The first Power Snooker tournament to be staged was played at The O_{2} in London on 30 October 2010. Eight players competed for a first prize of £35,000. Power Snooker had to receive sanction from the WPBSA to allow their players to take part in the cue sport tournament. It was organised and promoted independently by the Power Snooker Group and not by the World Professional Billiards and Snooker Association (WPBSA) which organise snooker events. Ronnie O'Sullivan won the inaugural tournament.

A second tournament was played in 2011. This was the last Power Snooker event that was staged.

== Background ==
=== Inception ===
Power Snooker was created by Rod Gunner and Ed Simons, both producers with backgrounds in the entertainment industry. Gunner had been involved with Michael Flatley's Lord of the Dance, while Simons was co-producer of the film The Lawnmower Man. Boxing promoter Frank Warren, a longtime business partner of Simons, also has a non-controlling stake in Power Snooker.

According to Simons, the pair had "liked snooker but wanted to create their own game a cue sport which was both fast and exciting". Gunner stated, "It had struck me for some time that Power Snooker would be a new and exciting transfusion", and that he took his inspiration from "seeing how Twenty20 cricket had revitalised cricket".

Power Snooker officially launched on 22 July 2010 with former World Champion Ronnie O'Sullivan as the main snooker player endorsement. O'Sullivan said of the new cue sport "the crowd will love it and the public will enjoy it".

=== Relationship to World Snooker ===
Power Snooker is independent of the World Professional Billiards and Snooker Association, organisers of the World Snooker Championship and other ranking tournaments, and regulators of the professional game. This new cue sport format has however been officially sanctioned by the WPBSA's chief shareholder, Barry Hearn. Simons had stated that he sees Power Snooker as simply being one a new cue sport and he hoped Hearn would approve since he took control of World Snooker, rather than being a threat to the established format of the traditional game or a competitor to WPBSA tournaments.

According to The Guardian, Hearn sees Power Snooker as "an element of [the WPBSA's] ongoing attempt to overhaul the sport and introduce it to new audiences". Hearn stated on the launch that "We are 100% behind Power Snooker. In this new time for World Snooker, it is important for us to embrace new formats and new ideas", stating that he believed it would bring new audiences and fans to snooker. The Guardian also stated that Hearn believes these new formats will hopefully draw new fans into the traditional form of the sport, and that he compared it to the Prizefighter series he had recently introduced to boxing, and his recent revamp of the Professional Darts Corporation. Hearn has not invested financially in the format, with Simons stating that "Our feeling is that he'll [Hearn] take a look at the [first tournament], see how it goes, and then we'll have another conversation".

== Format ==
=== General play ===
Colour	Value
Red	1 point
Yellow	2 points
Green	3 points
Brown	4 points
Blue	5 points
Pink	6 points
Black	7 points
Red-and-white	2 points + doubles all values for 30 seconds

The layout of balls in power snooker

Power Snooker is played on traditional-sized snooker tables, but with a "modern design and a bespoke Power Snooker baize". Unlike traditional snooker, in which matches are played to a certain number of frames irrespective of time taken, Power Snooker matches are played for a fixed 30 minute game play period, with the balls being continually re-racked. The winner is the player who has scored more cumulative points by the end of the fixed game play period, with ties settled with a single re-spotted black. The 30 minute game clock is halted between racks. Also unlike traditional Snooker, which uses 15 red balls racked in a triangle shape, Power Snooker matches use just nine red balls racked in a nine ball pool style diamond shape.

=== Scoring and shot clock ===
Power Snooker is different from traditional snooker. As the person who takes the break-off shot gets to keep their turn at the table as long as two reds hit a cushion after their break off shot. Power Snooker play is kept to a quick pace through the use of a shot clock with all shots having a twenty-second limit. If the player exceeds the shot clock the player is penalised 20 points, and their opponent can resume play, or can elect to let the other player play on. A century break is rewarded with 50 bonus points, and if the player can repeat this in the second consecutive frame, this doubles to 100 points, and in a third consecutive frame, to 200 points. This reward for century breaks was, however, removed in 2011. After a foul shot, the opponent gets a "ball in hand" and can resume play from anywhere in the baulk area.

=== Power Ball, Power Play, and Power Zone ===
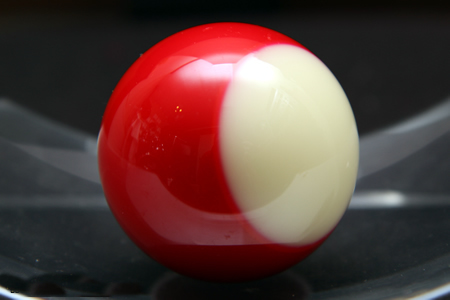
The most recent version of the Power Ball. The Power Ball looks similar to the 11-ball in pool but without a number.

Power Snooker uses the concepts of the Power Ball, Power Play, and Power Zone. The Power Ball is placed in the centre of the diamond rack, and is worth two points. When the Power Ball is potted, a two-minute Power Play period starts, where all points values are doubled. If a shot is missed however, the opponent can also benefit from the remaining Power Play time.

The Power Ball was a darker red with an embedded logo for the 2010 tournament; in 2011 this was changed to a red striped ball, similar to the 11-ball in pool. On the Power Snooker table, the baulk area is known as the Power Zone. Any colour ball potted from a shot originating in the Power Zone counts as double points, and if potted during a Power Play, quadruple points. In 2011 this was extended to the red balls as well. If a player fouls during a Power Play or in the Power Zone, their points penalty doubles, and if the foul shot originated in a Power Zone and during a Power Play, the penalty quadruples.

=== Tournament presentation and audience interaction ===
In contrast to traditional snooker, in which play occurs in quiet surroundings, with an audience expected to remain silent during shots, Power Snooker aimed "to encourage audience interaction with the players", loud music and 'spectacular' theatrical lighting were also a feature. Players also had the option to wear a live microphone during play, "to facilitate and encourage audience interaction". According to the creators, the Power Snooker format "isn't about sitting quietly watching, it's about noise and interaction; we want the audience to feel a part of it and enjoy themselves.".

In order to "add glamour" to the Power Snooker tournaments, players are encouraged to wear designer outfits, while the referees were exclusively female and were "dressed to impress". Tournaments also featured "Power Girls". According to the organisers, "It was important the girls matched the Power Snooker brand criteria; Power Girls are sexy, sassy and very elegant".

== Winners ==
Year	Winner	Runner-Up	Final score
Power Snooker (cue sport)
2010	(England) Ronnie O'Sullivan	(China) Ding Junhui	572–258 points (Unlimited Racks)
2011	(England) Martin Gould	(England) Ronnie O'Sullivan	286–258 points (Unlimited Racks)

== Reception ==
The Guardian, while reserving judgement on whether the revamped Power Snooker could emulate the success of Twenty20 cricket, pointed out that on the eve of the inaugural tournament the format had yet to find a bookmaker partner, and also drew an unfavourable comparison with the failure of PowerPlay Golf to generate much money. They also described Ronnie O'Sullivan's comments on launching the format, that the current WPBSA organised World Championship was "really boring", as being "not quite a Gerald Ratner moment", referring to the time when Ratner inadvertently devalued his jewellery business after he publicly criticised his product's value.

== See also ==
- List of snooker tournaments
