= Jamie Jones (snooker player) =

Welsh snooker player (born 1988)

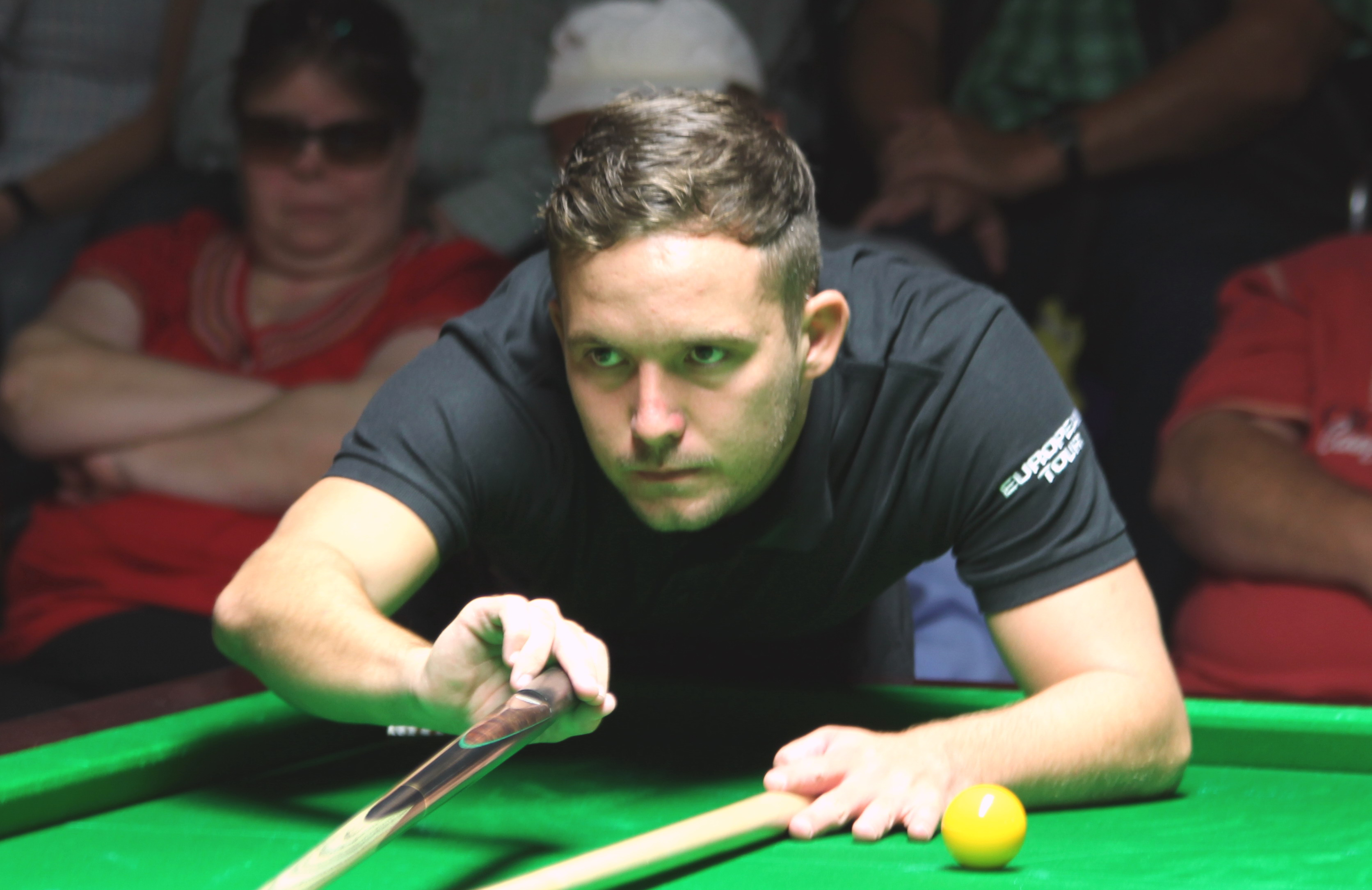
- Jones at the 2013 Paul Hunter Classic

Personal information
- Nickname: The Welsh Warrior
- Born: 14 February 1988 (age 38) Neath, Neath Port Talbot, Wales

Sport
- Country: Wales
- Sport: Snooker
- Professional: 2006/2007, 2008/2009, 2010–2019, 2020–present
- Highest ranking: 27 (as of October 2022)
- Current ranking: 62 (as of 4 October 2026)
- Maximum breaks: 1
- Century breaks: 178 (as of 4 October 2026)
- Best ranking finish: Semi-final (x3)

Jamie Jones (born 14 February 1988) is a Welsh professional snooker player from Neath. At the age of 14 he was the youngest ever player to make a maximum 147 break in competition, a record that has since been beaten by Judd Trump. At the 2012 World Snooker Championship, Jones reached his first ranking quarter-final. He made his second appearance in the quarter-finals of a Triple Crown tournament at the 2016 UK Championship.

In October 2018, Jones was suspended from the snooker tour pending a match-fixing investigation into a 2016 International Championship qualifier between Graeme Dott and David John. In January 2019, Jones was acquitted of match-fixing, however admitted to having prior knowledge of an approach to fix the aforementioned match and failing to report it, and was subsequently banned for a year. While the ban finished in October 2019, he ended the 2018–19 season outside the top 64 and was relegated from the tour. Jones rejoined the tour two seasons later via Q-School.

== Career ==
=== Early career ===
In 2002, aged 14, Jones became the youngest-ever player to make a 147 in an official event, a record that has since been beaten by Judd Trump. Jones began his professional career by playing Challenge Tour in 2004, at the time the second-level professional tour. He qualified for the Main Tour for 2006/2007 by finishing top of the 2005/06 Welsh rankings, although he could not maintain his place there. His best result in his first season as a professional was to the last 48 of the Royal London Watches Grand Prix. After another spell on the tour in 2008–09, after which he was again relegated, he regained a place for the 2010–11 season due to his position in the International Open Series, a qualifying route to the professional ranks.

=== 2010/2011 season ===
Jones started the new season by winning three qualifying matches in the Shanghai Masters, beating Kuldesh Johal, Jimmy Michie and Adrian Gunnell before losing to Stephen Lee. After reaching the final of Players Tour Championship – Event 5, Jones rose to 47 in the rankings at the end of the season.

=== 2011/2012 season ===
Jones made it to the quarter-finals of three Players Tour Championship events, but failed to progress further in any of them. However, his consistent performances meant he finished 23rd in the Order of Merit and therefore qualified for the 2012 PTC Finals, where he reached the last 16 of a ranking event for the first time by defeating reigning World Champion John Higgins 4 frames to 3, after being 1–3 down. This set up a match with Andrew Higginson, which he lost 3–4. Jones won two qualifying matches to reach the China Open, but lost 3–5 to Lu Ning in the wildcard round.

Jones finished the season by qualifying for the 2012 World Championship, beating Ricky Walden 10–2 in the final qualifying round. He then beat Shaun Murphy 10–8 in the first round, scoring two centuries. In the second round he beat Andrew Higginson 13–10, included a 135 break in the penultimate frame, to reach his first ever ranking event quarter-final. In the quarter-final he was defeated 11–13 by former world number 2 Ali Carter, but made back-to-back clearances of 138 and 132 in frames 11 and 12, coming back from 12–8 to 12–11 before eventual runner-up Carter won the match. Jones made seven centuries during the tournament, with only eventual winner Ronnie O'Sullivan making more. Jones finished the season ranked a career high world number 29, meaning he had risen 18 places during the year.

=== 2012/2013 season ===
Following his superb run in last season's World Championship, Jones endured a difficult 2012–13 season. He could only win three matches in ranking event qualifiers all year, with his sole appearance in the main draw coming at the Shanghai Masters. He beat Jimmy White in qualifying and Lu Ning in the wildcard round, but was then defeated 5–2 by John Higgins in the first round. He fared better in the Players Tour Championship events, with his best result coming at the Paul Hunter Classic, where he had wins over Jimmy Robertson, Jak Jones and Li Yan, before losing 4–2 to compatriot Ryan Day. He finished 67th on the PTC Order of Merit. Jones could not repeat last season's run to The Crucible as he was beaten 10–9 by Liam Highfield in the third round of World Championship Qualifying. His disappointing year was reflected in the rankings as he dropped 11 places to finish world number 40.

=== 2013/2014 season ===
Jones reached the first round of the 2013 Wuxi Classic, but lost 5–4 to Liang Wenbo. He qualified for five more ranking events but was beaten in the opening round of each. He had a very good year in the eight minor-ranking European Tour events, losing in the last 16 in two of them. His deepest finish came at the Kay Suzanne Memorial Cup where he beat Ian Burns 4–2 in the quarter-finals. In the semis he was edged out 4–3 by Judd Trump and finished 15th on the Order of Merit to qualify for the Finals for the third time in four years. Jones lost 4–2 to Mark Allen in the first round. His drop down the rankings continued as he ended the season as the world number 55.

=== 2014/2015 season ===
At the 2014 Wuxi Classic, Jones defeated Ken Doherty 5–2, before losing 5–3 to Marco Fu in the second round. He won three matches to qualify for the Australian Goldfields Open and thrashed Stephen Maguire 5–0, before being the victim of a whitewash in the second round by Neil Robertson. The next match Jones could win at the venue stage of a ranking event was at the Welsh Open, 4–0 over Chris Norbury. In the second round he knocked out Shaun Murphy 4–3 and stated that he plays his best snooker in the televised stages of tournaments. In an all-Welsh affair, Jones lost 4–2 to Mark Williams in the third round. He then reached the last 16 in back-to-back ranking tournaments, losing 4–1 to Thepchaiya Un-Nooh at the Indian Open and 5–3 to Murphy at the China Open. Jones qualified for his second World Championship by beating Adam Duffy 10–8 in the final round. He suffered a heavy 10–2 loss to Neil Robertson in the first round. However, Jones halted his slide down the rankings as he climbed 17 spots this season to end it 38th.

=== 2015/2016 season ===
After edging Mark Davis 5–4 in the opening round of the Australian Goldfields Open, Jones thrashed Mark Selby 5–1 and said that he hoped running during the off-season would give himself a better chance of winning more matches this season. He played friend and former schoolmate Michael White in the quarter-finals with Jones recovering from 4–2 down to tie the match at 4–4. In the deciding frame White made a break of 56, before missing a red and Jones cleared with a 66 to reach the first ranking semi-final of his career. He raced into a 4–0 lead over John Higgins, but then lost six frames in a row to exit the tournament. Jones beat Ian Glover 6–4 and Xiao Guodong 6–1 at the UK Championship and made two centuries against Selby, but lost 6–5 with Selby stating that Jones had deserved to win the match. He played in three more ranking events, but lost in the first round of each and his season was ended with a 10–5 loss to Hamza Akbar in World Championship qualifying, who had previously lost all eight of his matches on tour.

=== 2016/2017 season ===
Jones dropped just two frames in reaching the quarter-finals of the 2016 Paul Hunter Classic, but then lost 4–1 to Tom Ford. At the UK Championship he saw off Eden Sharav 6–1 in the first round and then had a trio of 6–2 victories over Alan McManus, Ding Junhui and David Gilbert to mean he had made two ranking event quarter-finals in the same season for the first time in his career. Jones had a great chance to reach his second semi-final as he led Marco Fu 5–2, but he would go on to lose 6–5. Jones was 4–0 ahead of Graeme Dott in the final qualifying round for the World Championship, but was beaten 10–8.

=== 2018/2019 season ===
Jones made his first official maximum break in the third frame of his last-64 match against Lee Walker at the 2018 Paul Hunter Classic. It was his first professional maximum break.

=== 2020/2021 season ===
Jones returned to the tour from a ban after qualifying through Q-School. He had a strong start to the season, including a run to the semi-finals of the 2020 Scottish Open, where he ultimately lost 6–1 to Mark Selby. Jones continued to perform well in tournaments, and at the 2021 World Championship, a 10–5 victory over Li Hang in the final qualifying round saw him make his fourth Crucible appearance. In the first round, he faced Stephen Maguire, and having trailed 3–0 in the early stages of that match, he won ten out of the next eleven frames to run out a 10-4 winner. He then faced Stuart Bingham in the last 16, and although the first session was shared 4-4, Jones only won two more frames, losing the match 13–6. He finished the season ranked 55th.

=== 2021/2022 season ===
Jones had a much quieter season than his previous one, which included a first round exit at the 2021 UK Championship, where he lost 6–1 to Cao Yupeng. At the Scottish Open, he reached the last 16, where he lost 4–3 to Ronnie O'Sullivan. At the Gibraltar Open, he reached the quarter-finals, before losing 4–1 to Ricky Walden. At the 2022 World Championship, he beat Mark Joyce 6–1, and Tom Ford 10–5 in qualifying. In the main stages of the event, he faced Mark Selby in the first round, and having trailed 8–3, a late fightback saw him only lose 10–7.

== Performance and rankings timeline ==
Tournament	2004/ 05	2006/ 07	2008/ 09	2010/ 11	2011/ 12	2012/ 13	2013/ 14	2014/ 15	2015/ 16	2016/ 17	2017/ 18	2018/ 19	2020/ 21	2021/ 22	2022/ 23	2023/ 24	2024/ 25	2025/ 26	2026/ 27
Ranking (Note: It shows the ranking at the beginning of the season)	(Note: He was an amateur)	(Note: New players don't have a ranking)			47	29	40	55	38	35	35	39		55	31	43	41	51	63
Ranking tournaments
Championship League	Not Held		Non-Ranking Event										RR	RR	2R	RR	2R	RR	RR
China Open	A	LQ	LQ	LQ	WR	LQ	1R	3R	1R	LQ	LQ	A	Tournament Not Held						LQ
Wuhan Open	Tournament Not Held															2R	LQ	1R	LQ
British Open	A	Tournament Not Held												1R	QF	1R	LQ	LQ	1R
English Open	Tournament Not Held									WD	2R	WD	2R	LQ	3R	1R	2R	1R	LQ
Shenzhen Open (Note: The event was called the Xi'an Grand Prix (2024/2025–2025/2026))	Tournament Not Held																1R	WD	LQ
Northern Ireland Open	Tournament Not Held									1R	1R	A	1R	LQ	LQ	LQ	LQ	LQ	
International Championship	Tournament Not Held					LQ	1R	WR	2R	1R	LQ	WD	Not Held			1R	WD	LQ	LQ
UK Championship	A	LQ	LQ	LQ	LQ	LQ	1R	1R	3R	QF	2R	A	4R	1R	LQ	2R	LQ	LQ	
Shoot Out	Not Held			Non-Ranking Event						1R	4R	A	1R	1R	2R	1R	3R	1R	
Scottish Open	Tournament Not Held					MR	Not Held			1R	2R	A	SF	3R	3R	1R	1R	LQ	LQ
German Masters	Not Held			A	LQ	LQ	LQ	LQ	LQ	1R	LQ	A	LQ	LQ	LQ	LQ	LQ	LQ	
Welsh Open	A	LQ	LQ	LQ	LQ	LQ	2R	3R	1R	2R	2R	A	2R	1R	LQ	LQ	3R	LQ	
World Grand Prix	Tournament Not Held							NR	1R	1R	DNQ	DNQ	1R	DNQ	1R	1R	DNQ	DNQ	
Players Championship (Note: The event was called the Players Tour Championship Grand Final (2010/2011–2015/2016))	Not Held			1R	2R	DNQ	1R	DNQ	DNQ	DNQ	DNQ	DNQ	DNQ	DNQ	DNQ	DNQ	DNQ	DNQ	
World Open (Note: The event was called the Grand Prix (2004/2005, 2006/2007 and 2008/2009))	A	RR	LQ	LQ	LQ	LQ	1R	Not Held		LQ	1R	2R	Not Held			1R	1R	LQ	
Tour Championship	Tournament Not Held											DNQ	DNQ	DNQ	DNQ	DNQ	DNQ	DNQ	
World Championship	LQ	LQ	LQ	LQ	QF	LQ	LQ	1R	LQ	LQ	2R	A	2R	1R	LQ	1R	LQ	LQ	
Non-ranking tournaments
The Masters	A	LQ	LQ	A	A	A	A	A	A	A	A	A	A	A	A	A	A	A	
Championship League	A	A	A	A	A	A	A	A	A	A	A	A	A	A	RR	A	A	A	
Former ranking tournaments
Northern Ireland Trophy	NH	LQ	LQ	Tournament Not Held															
Bahrain Championship	Not Held		LQ	Tournament Not Held															
Wuxi Classic (Note: The event was called the Jiangsu Classic (2008/2009))	Not Held		Non-Ranking Event			LQ	1R	2R	Tournament Not Held										
Australian Goldfields Open	Tournament Not Held				LQ	LQ	LQ	2R	SF	Tournament Not Held									
Shanghai Masters	Not Held		LQ	LQ	LQ	1R	LQ	LQ	WR	1R	2R	NR	Not Held			Non-Ranking Event			
Riga Masters (Note: The event was called the Riga Open (2014/2015–2015/2016))	Tournament Not Held							Minor-Rank		2R	1R	2R	Tournament Not Held						
Paul Hunter Classic (Note: The event was called the Grand Prix Fürth (2004/2005) and the Fürth German Open (2006/2007))	Pro-am Event			Minor-Ranking Event						QF	SF	2R	Tournament Not Held						
China Championship	Tournament Not Held									NR	LQ	2R	Tournament Not Held						
Indian Open	Tournament Not Held						1R	3R	NH	2R	LQ	WD	Tournament Not Held						
WST Pro Series	Tournament Not Held												RR	Tournament Not Held					
Turkish Masters	Tournament Not Held													1R	Tournament Not Held				
Gibraltar Open	Tournament Not Held								MR	4R	1R	A	2R	QF	Tournament Not Held				
WST Classic	Tournament Not Held														3R	Tournament Not Held			
European Masters (Note: The event was called the Malta Cup (2004/2005 and 2006/2007))	A	LQ	Tournament Not Held							LQ	1R	LQ	2R	1R	QF	1R	Not Held		
Saudi Arabia Masters	Tournament Not Held																3R	4R	NH
Former non-ranking tournaments
Masters Qualifying Event	NH	1R	1R	Tournament Not held															
Shoot Out	Not Held			A	3R	2R	1R	SF	1R	Ranking Event									
Six-red World Championship (Note: The event was called the Six-red Snooker International (2008/2009))	Not Held		A	3R	NH	A	A	A	A	A	A	A	Not Held		LQ	Tournament Not Held			

Performance Table Legend
LQ	lost in the qualifying draw	#R	lost in the early rounds of the tournament (WR = Wildcard round, RR = Round robin)	QF	lost in the quarter-finals
SF	lost in the semi-finals	F	lost in the final	W	won the tournament
DNQ	did not qualify for the tournament	A	did not participate in the tournament	WD	withdrew from the tournament

NH / Not Held	means an event was not held.
NR / Non-Ranking Event	means an event is/was no longer a ranking event.
R / Ranking Event	means an event is/was a ranking event.
MR / Minor-Ranking Event	means an event is/was a minor-ranking event.
PA / Pro-am Event	means an event is/was a pro-am event.

== Career finals ==
=== Minor-ranking finals: 1 ===
Outcome	No.	Year	Championship	Opponent in the final	Score
Runner-up	1	2010	Players Tour Championship – Event 5	(China) Ding Junhui	1–4

=== Pro-am finals: 4 (2 titles) ===
Outcome	No.	Year	Championship	Opponent in the final	Score
Runner-up	1.	2005	Liam O'Connor Memorial	(Wales) Dominic Dale	0–6
Winner	1.	2006	Baltic Cup	(England) Ben Woollaston	5–3
Runner-up	2.	2012	Vienna Snooker Open	(England) Simon Bedford	2–5
Winner	2.	2016	Pink Ribbon	(England) David Grace	4–3

=== Amateur finals: 5 (5 titles) ===
Outcome	No.	Year	Championship	Opponent in the final	Score
Winner	1.	2004	European Under-19 Championship	(Northern Ireland) Mark Allen	6–3
Winner	2.	2006	Welsh Amateur Championship	(Wales) Philip Williams	9–8
Winner	3.	2008	PIOS – Event 7	(England) Peter Lines	6–2
Winner	4.	2008	Welsh Amateur Championship (2)	(Wales) David Donovan	8–2
Winner	5.	2009	PIOS – Event 4	(Wales) Jak Jones	6–0
