= Grand Hyatt Mumbai =

Hotel in Mumbai, India

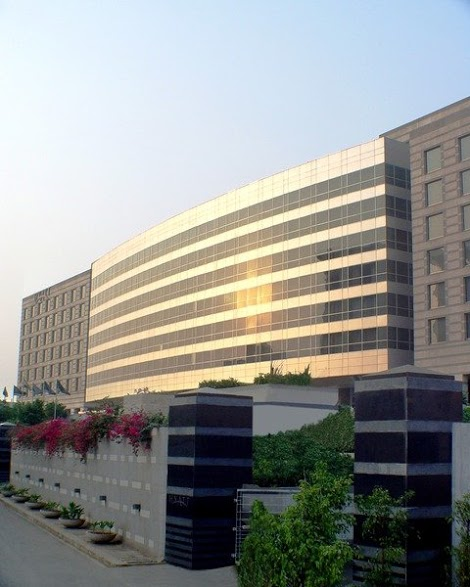
- Grand Hyatt Mumbai
- Interactive map of the Grand Hyatt Mumbai area
- Hotel chain: Hyatt Hotels Corporation

General information
- Location: India, Off Western Express Highway, Santacruz (East), Mumbai - 400055, India
- Opening: 2004
- Owner: Juniper Hotels Limited
- Operator: Hyatt Hotels Corporation

Technical details
- Floor count: 6

Design and construction
- Architects: Lohan Associates, Chicago

Other information
- Number of rooms: 547
- Number of suites: 39

Website
- http://mumbai.grand.hyatt.com/

Grand Hyatt Mumbai is a luxury five star hotel located off the Western Express Highway, Santacruz (East) in Mumbai, India. Designed by Chicago's Lohan Associates, Grand Hyatt Mumbai was opened in 2004.

== Infrastructure and Amenities ==
The hotel has a total of 547 rooms and 111 serviced apartments built on an area of about 18 acres. The banquet level of the hotel offers over 30,000 square feet/2,790 square meters of conference and meeting space including one fully wired ballrooms in the city; seven additional meeting rooms and board rooms and a pre-function area. It also has four specialty restaurants — China House, Celini, Soma and Fifty Five East; which serve Indian and international cuisines. It also has a Bar, lounges, Gourmet Store, fitness center and a beauty salon which are situated inside a multi-level shopping plaza. It also has a Grand Club, Club Oasis spa, pool area and barbecue area for Residences, Kids play area, Business Center, outdoor recreation facilities and facilities for physically challenged guests and single women travelers. The hotel also has one of the largest collections of art in a public space in India, that showcases over 100 commissioned pieces of art by established and upcoming artists; curated in collaboration with Rajeev Sethi.

== Events ==
It entered into Limca Book of Records on 25 February 2012 for India's longest lunch table. The table was around 200 meters long and could cater to 530 guests at a time.
