= Maximum and century breaks made by Ronnie O'Sullivan =

List of breaks by English snooker player

Ronnie O'Sullivan holds the record for the highest numbers of competitive centuries and maximum breaks, as well as the fastest maximum break of all time, in the professional sport of snooker. He also holds the highest break in professional snooker of 153.

== Maximum breaks ==
Ronnie O'Sullivan has made 17 official maximum breaks in professional competition, the highest number completed by any player. This total only includes maximum breaks that have been ratified by the World Professional Billiards and Snooker Association (WPBSA); it does not include maximums compiled in exhibition matches, or in events that are not sanctioned by the world governing body.

In addition to the seventeen maximum breaks officially recognised by the WPBSA, other high-profile maximums include a 147 compiled against Joe Swail in the quarter-final of the 2007 Irish Masters. The maximum break prize of a Citroën Coupe, worth €20,000, was withdrawn when the organisers were unable to obtain insurance against a 147 being made. However, this was concealed from the players and O'Sullivan only learned of the withdrawal of the prize after he had made the maximum.

At the 2016 Welsh Open, O'Sullivan was on course for a 147 after potting 14 reds and 13 blacks, but then opted to pot the pink instead of the black, meaning he finished with a 146 break instead. He said this was in protest against what he believed to be the insufficient prize money awarded for the maximum, which in that tournament stood at £10,000 for the 147 in addition to the £2,000 highest break prize. A similar incident had occurred six years earlier in a match at the 2010 World Open (listed as number 10 in the table below). In this case, however, he was eventually persuaded to pot the final black by the referee Jan Verhaas. O'Sullivan has been criticised for such behaviour, which has been labelled unsportsmanlike and disrespectful to snooker fans, as well as to the socio-economically disadvantaged, who might benefit from a charitable donation of the ostensibly insufficient prize money. However, he has defended his behaviour whilst also conceding that in hindsight he would rather have given the money to charity. In an interview, he asserted his right to enhance his own enjoyment of the game, as well as the spectacle for his fans, by engaging in such characterful, mischievous, and showmanlike behaviour.

Completed in 5 minutes and 8 seconds, O'Sullivan's first 147 break, against Mick Price in their second-round tie at the 1997 world championship, set a world record (yet to be broken) for the fastest maximum officially recognised in professional competition. Initially Guinness World Records recorded the time of the break at 5 minutes and 20 seconds. However, an analysis undertaken by Deadspin in 2017 revealed that the time recorded by Guinness World Records was incorrect, as a result of the timer being started too early on the BBC footage. Breaks are not officially timed in snooker and the official rules of snooker do not specify how they should be timed, instead leaving the timing to the discretion of the broadcaster. World Snooker has since suggested that a break starts when the player strikes the cueball for the first time in the break; this would result in a time of 5 minutes and 8 seconds, which is the time now officially recognised by both World Snooker and Guinness World Records. However, this methodology for timing breaks is inconsistent with the one employed in shot clock events where timing for a player's shot begins when the balls have come to rest from the opponent's previous shot, and under this convention the break would have been timed at 5 minutes and 15 seconds.

Additionally, O'Sullivan holds the record for the most 147 breaks to be completed during the final frame of a match. He has made a maximum in a final frame on six occasions, one of these in the deciding frame of his semi-final victory over Mark Selby at the 2007 UK Championship.

=== Full list ===
A full list of O'Sullivan's competitive maximum breaks is given below:

Table legend
^{Q}	Qualifying round of the tournament
^{F}	Final frame of the match
^{D}	Deciding frame of the match (also implicitly the final frame of the match)
^{L}	Match ended in a loss for O'Sullivan

No.	Year	Tournament	Opponent	Round	Ref.
1	1997	World Championship	Mick Price (ENG)	Last 32	
2	1999	Welsh Open	James Wattana (THA)	Quarter-final	
3	1999	Grand Prix	Graeme Dott (SCO)	Last 32	
4	2000	Scottish Open	Quinten Hann (AUS)	Last 32	
5	2001	LG Cup	Drew Henry (SCO)	Last 16	
6	2003	World Championship	Marco Fu (HKG)	Last 32^{L}	
7	2007	Northern Ireland Trophy	Ali Carter (ENG)	Last 16	
8	2007	UK Championship	Mark Selby (ENG)	Semi-final^{D}	
9	2008	World Championship	Mark Williams (WAL)	Last 16^{F}	
10	2010	World Open	Mark King (ENG)	Last 64^{Q,F}	
11	2011	Paul Hunter Classic	Adam Duffy (ENG)	Last 32	
12	2014	Welsh Open	Ding Junhui (CHN)	Final^{F}	
13	2014	UK Championship	Matthew Selt (ENG)	Last 16^{F}	
14	2018	China Open	Elliot Slessor (ENG)	Last 64^{L}	
15	2018	English Open	Allan Taylor (ENG)	Last 64^{F}	
16	2025	Saudi Arabia Snooker Masters	Chris Wakelin (ENG)	Semi-final	
17	2025	Saudi Arabia Snooker Masters	Chris Wakelin (ENG)	Semi-final	

== Century breaks ==
By the start of the 2007–08 snooker season, O'Sullivan had made 479 century breaks. He then made one century in the 2007 Euro-Asia Masters Challenge, seven in the 2007 Grand Prix, six in the 2007 Premier League Snooker before the 2007 Northern Ireland Trophy, and six more in the Northern Ireland Trophy, bringing his total to 499. His 500th century was recorded on 15 November 2007, in the second frame of his Premier League match against Neil Robertson.

By the start of the 2010–11 snooker season, O'Sullivan had made 597 century breaks. He made one century in the Players Tour Championship 2010/2011 – Event 1, and four during the Players Tour Championship 2010/2011 – Event 4 which was played from 14 to 16 August 2010, making his 600th century during the tournament. He had made 695 century breaks at the start of the 2013–14 snooker season. He made four in the European Tour 2013/2014 – Event 1 to take his century total to 699. His first-round match in the European Tour 2013/2014 – Event 3 was against Lyu Haotian on 16 August 2013; Lyu led 3–1 but O'Sullivan came back to win 4–3, making his 700th century in the deciding frame. He made his 750th century on 22 August 2014 in the 2014 Paul Hunter Classic against Robbie Williams.

O'Sullivan had made 773 century breaks at the start of 2015. On 13 January, in the first round of the 2015 Masters, he made two centuries to equal Stephen Hendry's record of 775. Two days later, in his second-round match, he made his 776th century and broke Hendry's record. He made his 800th century on 5 January 2016 in a Championship League group match against Barry Hawkins, and his 900th on 10 November 2017, in the semi-final of the Champion of Champions against Anthony Hamilton. His 1,000th century was recorded on 10 March 2019, in the final of the Players Championship against Robertson. O'Sullivan made his 1,100th century on 22 March 2021, in his quarter-final match at the 2021 Tour Championship against John Higgins, his 1,200th century on 22 April 2023 in a second-round match against Hossein Vafaei at the 2023 World Snooker Championship, and his 1,300th century on 16 August 2025 against Robertson in the final of the 2025 Saudi Arabia Snooker Masters. At the 2022 Scottish Open, O'Sullivan scored a century in 3 minutes 34 seconds — just 3 seconds slower than the fastest televised century break, which was made by Tony Drago in 1996.

=== Partial list ===
Since the start of the 2003–04 season, O'Sullivan has made the following centuries. The tournaments are categorised as Ranking (R), Minor-ranking (MR), or Non-ranking (NR). (Note: This list excludes four centuries made in the 2007 Irish Masters and two centuries made in the 2011 Snooker Shoot-Out.)

Tournament	Centuries	Event type
Career total, end of 2002–03 season	326	
2003 British Open	4	Ranking
2003 UK Championship	12	Ranking
2004 Welsh Open	6	Ranking
2004 Masters	1	Non-ranking
2004 European Open	2	Ranking
2004 Irish Masters	1	Ranking
2004 Players Championship	3	Ranking
2004 World Championship	13	Ranking
Season total, end of 2003–04 season	42	
Career total, end of 2003–04 season	368	
2004 Grand Prix	6	Ranking
2004 British Open	2	Ranking
2004 UK Championship	3	Ranking
2005 Welsh Open	10	Ranking
2005 Masters	6	Non-ranking
2005 Irish Masters	8	Ranking
2005 World Championship	4	Ranking
2005 Premier League Snooker	3	Non-ranking
Season total, end of 2004–05 season	42	
Career total, end of 2004–05 season	410	
2005 Grand Prix	4	Ranking
2005 Premier League Snooker	10	Non-ranking
2005 UK Championship	2	Ranking
2006 Masters	3	Non-ranking
2006 World Championship	6	Ranking
Season total, end of 2005–06 season	25	
Career total, end of 2005–06 season	435	
2006 Northern Ireland Trophy	7	Ranking
2006 Grand Prix	7	Ranking
2006 Premier League Snooker	5	Non-ranking
2006 UK Championship	5	Ranking
2007 Masters	8	Non-ranking
2007 Welsh Open	4	Ranking
2007 China Open	3	Ranking
2007 World Championship	5	Ranking
Season total, end of 2006–07 season	44	
Career total, end of 2006–07 season	479	
2007 Euro-Asia Masters Challenge	1	Non-ranking
2007 Grand Prix	7	Ranking
2007 Northern Ireland Trophy	6	Ranking
2007 Premier League Snooker	11	Non-ranking
2007 UK Championship	6	Ranking
2008 Masters	1	Non-ranking
2008 Welsh Open	6	Ranking
2008 World Championship	12	Ranking
Season total, end of 2007–08 season	50	
Career total, end of 2007–08 season	529	
2008 Northern Ireland Trophy	6	Ranking
2008 Shanghai Masters	5	Ranking
2008 Grand Prix	2	Ranking
2008 Premier League Snooker	4	Non-ranking
2008 UK Championship	5	Ranking
2009 Masters	8	Non-ranking
2009 Welsh Open	1	Ranking
2009 China Open	2	Ranking
2009 World Championship	5	Ranking
Season total, end of 2008–09 season	38	
Career total, end of 2008–09 season	567	
2009 Shanghai Masters	3	Ranking
2009 Grand Prix	2	Ranking
2009 Premier League Snooker	6	Non-ranking
2009 UK Championship	6	Ranking
2010 Championship League	1	Non-ranking
2010 Masters	5	Non-ranking
2010 Welsh Open	1	Ranking
2010 World Championship	6	Ranking
Season total, end of 2009–10 season	30	
Career total, end of 2009–10 season	597	
Players Tour Championship 2010/2011 – Event 1	1	Minor-ranking
Players Tour Championship 2010/2011 – Event 4	4	Minor-ranking
2010 World Open	3	Ranking
2010 Premier League Snooker	9	Non-ranking
2011 Welsh Open	1	Ranking
2011 Championship League	6	Non-ranking
2011 China Open	1	Ranking
2011 World Championship	7	Ranking
Season total, end of 2010–11 season	32	
Career total, end of 2010–11 season	629	
Players Tour Championship 2011/2012 – Event 1	8	Minor-ranking
Players Tour Championship 2011/2012 – Event 2	2	Minor-ranking
Players Tour Championship 2011/2012 – Event 4	4	Minor-ranking
2011 Shanghai Masters	2	Ranking
Players Tour Championship 2011/2012 – Event 7	5	Minor-ranking
Players Tour Championship 2011/2012 – Event 9	5	Minor-ranking
2011 Premier League Snooker	3	Non-ranking
2011 UK Championship	2	Ranking
2012 Masters	2	Non-ranking
2012 German Masters	3	Ranking
2012 Welsh Open	4	Ranking
2012 China Open	1	Ranking
2012 World Championship	12	Ranking
Season total, end of 2011–12 season	53	
Career total, end of 2011–12 season	682	
2013 World Championship	13	Ranking
Season total, end of 2012–13 season	13	
Career total, end of 2012–13 season	695	
European Tour 2013/2014 – Event 1	4	Minor-ranking
European Tour 2013/2014 – Event 3	2	Minor-ranking
European Tour 2013/2014 – Event 4	1	Minor-ranking
European Tour 2013/2014 – Event 5	2	Minor-ranking
2013 International Championship	2	Ranking
European Tour 2013/2014 – Event 6	2	Minor-ranking
European Tour 2013/2014 – Event 7	6	Minor-ranking
2013 Champion of Champions	5	Non-ranking
2013 UK Championship	4	Ranking
2014 Masters	2	Non-ranking
2014 Welsh Open	8	Ranking
2014 Players Tour Championship Grand Final	2	Ranking
2014 World Championship	13	Ranking
Season total, end of 2013–14 season	53	
Career total, end of 2013–14 season	748	
2014 Paul Hunter Classic	3	Minor-ranking
2014 Shanghai Masters	1	Ranking
2014 International Championship	4	Ranking
2014 Champion of Champions	8	Non-ranking
2014 UK Championship	6	Ranking
2015 Masters	4	Non-ranking
2015 Championship League	4	Non-ranking
2015 German Masters	6 (Note: Three of these centuries were made in late 2014 during qualifying for the 2015 German Masters.)	Ranking
2015 Welsh Open	1	Ranking
2015 World Grand Prix	1	Non-ranking
2015 China Open	1	Ranking
2015 World Championship	7	Ranking
Season total, end of 2014–15 season	46	
Career total, end of 2014–15 season	794	
2016 Masters	5	Non-ranking
2016 German Masters	1	Ranking
2016 Welsh Open	10	Ranking
2016 Championship League	9	Non-ranking
2016 World Championship	5	Ranking
Season total, end of 2015–16 season	30	
Career total, end of 2015–16 season	824	
2016 European Masters	2	Ranking
2016 English Open	1	Ranking
2016 International Championship	2	Ranking
2016 Champion of Champions	6	Non-ranking
2016 Northern Ireland Open	6	Ranking
2016 UK Championship	10	Ranking
2016 Scottish Open	4	Ranking
2017 Masters	3	Non-ranking
2017 German Masters	1	Ranking
2017 World Grand Prix	2	Ranking
2017 Welsh Open	1	Ranking
2017 Players Championship	3	Ranking
2017 China Open	3	Ranking
2017 World Championship	6	Ranking
Season total, end of 2016–17 season	50	
Career total, end of 2016–17 season	874	
2017 Hong Kong Masters	3	Non-ranking
2017 China Championship	4	Ranking
2017 English Open	12	Ranking
2017 International Championship	2	Ranking
2017 Champion of Champions	6	Non-ranking
2017 Shanghai Masters	4	Ranking
2017 Northern Ireland Open	1	Ranking
2017 UK Championship	10	Ranking
2017 Scottish Open	4	Ranking
2018 Masters	3	Non-ranking
2018 World Grand Prix	10	Ranking
2018 Welsh Open	4	Ranking
2018 Players Championship	5	Ranking
2018 China Open	2	Ranking
2018 World Championship	4	Ranking
Season total, end of 2017–18 season	74	
Career total, end of 2017–18 season	948	
2018 Shanghai Masters	5	Non-ranking
2018 English Open	4	Ranking
2018 Champion of Champions	11	Non-ranking
2018 Northern Ireland Open	10	Ranking
2018 UK Championship	8	Ranking
2019 Masters	5	Non-ranking
2019 Welsh Open	3	Ranking
2019 Players Championship	6	Ranking
2019 Tour Championship	8	Ranking
2019 World Championship	1	Ranking
Season total, end of 2018–19 season	61	
Career total, end of 2018–19 season	1,009	
2019 Shanghai Masters	8	Non-ranking
2019 English Open	2	Ranking
2019 Champion of Champions	1	Non-ranking
2019 Northern Ireland Open	4	Ranking
2019 UK Championship	4	Ranking
2019 Scottish Open	7	Ranking
2020 World Grand Prix	5	Ranking
2020 Welsh Open	5	Ranking
2020 Championship League	4	Non-ranking
2020 World Championship	12	Ranking
Season total, end of 2019–20 season	52	
Career total, end of 2019–20 season	1,061	
2020 European Masters	1	Ranking
2020 English Open	1	Ranking
2020 Northern Ireland Open	6	Ranking
2020 UK Championship	1	Ranking
2020 Scottish Open	3	Ranking
2020 World Grand Prix	2	Ranking
2021 Masters	4	Non-ranking
2021 Championship League (invitational)	7	Non-ranking
2021 Welsh Open	6	Ranking
2021 Players Championship	5	Ranking
2021 WST Pro Series	1	Ranking
2021 Tour Championship	4	Ranking
2021 World Championship	5	Ranking
Season total, end of 2020–21 season	46	
Career total, end of 2020–21 season	1,107	
2021 Northern Ireland Open	2	Ranking
2021 English Open	9	Ranking
2021 Champion of Champions	1	Non-ranking
2021 UK Championship	5	Ranking
2021 Scottish Open	2	Ranking
2021 World Grand Prix	2	Ranking
2022 Masters	3	Non-ranking
2022 Championship League (invitational)	2	Non-ranking
2022 Players Championship	1	Ranking
2022 European Masters	10	Ranking
2022 Tour Championship	10	Ranking
2022 World Snooker Championship	15	Ranking
Season total, end of 2021–22 season	62	
Career total, end of 2021–22 season	1,169	
2022 Championship League (ranking)	2	Ranking
2022 World Mixed Doubles	1	Non-ranking
2022 Hong Kong Masters	5	Non-ranking
2022 Champion of Champions	7	Non-ranking
2022 UK Championship	4	Ranking
2022 Scottish Open	1	Ranking
2022 English Open	1	Ranking
2023 Masters	3	Non-ranking
2023 World Grand Prix	1	Ranking
2023 Welsh Open	2	Ranking
2023 WST Classic	2	Ranking
2023 World Snooker Championship	4	Ranking
Season total, end of 2022–23 season	33	
Career total, end of 2022–23 season	1,202	
2023 Shanghai Masters	8	Non-ranking
2023 English Open	3	Ranking
2023 Wuhan Open	5	Ranking
2023 International Championship	6	Ranking
2023 UK Championship	6	Ranking
2024 Masters	3	Non-ranking
2024 World Grand Prix	7	Ranking
2024 Players Championship	1	Ranking
2024 Championship League (invitational)	3	Non-ranking
2024 World Masters of Snooker	6	Non-ranking
2024 World Open	4	Ranking
2024 Tour Championship	6	Ranking
2024 World Snooker Championship	4	Ranking
Season total, end of 2023–24 season	62	
Career total, end of 2023–24 season	1,264	
2024 Shanghai Masters	1	Non-ranking
2024 Xi'an Grand Prix	3	Ranking
2024 Saudi Arabia Snooker Masters	4	Ranking
2024 International Championship	2	Ranking
2024 Champion of Champions	1	Non-ranking
2024 UK Championship	2	Ranking
2024 Snooker Championship (Riyadh)	2	Non-ranking
2025 Championship League (invitational)	3	Non-ranking
2025 World Snooker Championship	7	Ranking
Season total, end of 2024–25 season	25	
Career total, end of 2024–25 season	1,289	
2025 Saudi Arabia Snooker Masters	11	Ranking
2025 Xi'an Grand Prix	6	Ranking
2025 International Championship	6	Ranking
2025 UK Championship	1	Ranking
2026 World Open	12	Ranking
2026 World Snooker Championship	5	Ranking
Season total, end of 2025–26 season	41	
Career total, end of 2025–26 season	1,330	
2026 Shanghai Masters	3	Non-ranking
2026 China Open	1	Ranking
2026 Wuhan Open	4	Ranking
2026 Northern Ireland Open	1	Ranking
Current season total	9	
Current career total	1,339	

As of 19 October 2026
