= 2001 Premier League Snooker =

Sportingbet.com Premier League
Tournament information
- Dates: 6 January – 13 May 2001
- Country: United Kingdom
- Organisation: Matchroom Sport
- Format: Non-ranking event
- Highest break: 143

Final
- Champion: (England) Ronnie O'Sullivan
- Runner-up: (Scotland) Stephen Hendry
- Score: 9–7

The 2001 Sportingbet.com Premier League was a professional non-ranking snooker tournament that was played from 6 January to 13 May 2001. The highest break of the tournament was 143 made by Marco Fu against Stephen Hendry on 25 March 2001.

Ronnie O'Sullivan won in the final 9–7 against Hendry.

== League phase ==
Ranking		(Hong Kong) FU	(England) OSU	(Scotland) HIG	(Scotland) HEN	(Wales) WIL	(England) DAV	(England) WHI	Frame W-L	Match W-D-L	Pld-Pts
1	Marco Fu	x	5	2	5	5	5	6	28–20	5–0–1	6–10
2	Ronnie O'Sullivan	3	x	4	6	4	7	6	30–18	3–2–1	6–8
3	John Higgins	6	4	x	3	4	5	5	27–21	3–2–1	6–8
4	Stephen Hendry	3	2	5	x	6	6	4	26–22	3–1–2	6–7
5	Mark Williams	3	4	4	2	x	6	7	26–22	2–2–2	6–6
6	Steve Davis	3	1	3	2	2	x	5	16–32	1–0–5	6–2
7	Jimmy White	2	2	3	4	1	3	x	15–33	0–1–5	6–1

Top four qualified for the play-offs. If points were level then most frames won determined their positions. If two players had an identical record then the result in their match determined their positions. If that ended 4–4 then the player who got to four first was higher.

- 6 January – Brangwyn Hall, Swansea, Wales
  - Marco Fu 5–3 Mark Williams
  - Ronnie O'Sullivan 7–1 Steve Davis
  - Stephen Hendry 4–4 Jimmy White
- 7 January – Brangwyn Hall, Swansea, Wales
  - Marco Fu 6–2 Jimmy White
  - Stephen Hendry 6–2 Steve Davis
  - Mark Williams 4–4 John Higgins
- 2 February – Woodford Leisure Centre, Hull, England
  - Marco Fu 5–3 Steve Davis
  - Ronnie O'Sullivan 6–2 Stephen Hendry
- 3 February – Woodford Leisure Centre, Hull, England
  - Marco Fu 5–3 Ronnie O'Sullivan
  - Mark Williams 6–2 Steve Davis
  - John Higgins 5–3 Jimmy White
- 17 February – Kingsway Leisure Centre, Widnes, England
  - Steve Davis 5–3 Jimmy White
  - John Higgins 6–2 Marco Fu
  - Mark Williams 4–4 Ronnie O'Sullivan
- 18 February – Kingsway Leisure Centre, Widnes, England
  - Stephen Hendry 6–2 Mark Williams
  - John Higgins 4–4 Ronnie O'Sullivan
- 24 March – Rothwell Sports Centre, Leeds, England
  - Ronnie O'Sullivan 6–2 Jimmy White
  - Stephen Hendry 5–3 John Higgins
- 25 March – Rothwell Sports Centre, Leeds, England
  - John Higgins 5–3 Steve Davis
  - Marco Fu 5–3 Stephen Hendry
  - Mark Williams 7–1 Jimmy White

== Play-offs ==
12–13 May – Inverness Leisure Centre, Inverness, Scotland

Semi-finals; Best of 11 frames
1	(Hong Kong) Marco Fu	5
4	(Scotland) Stephen Hendry	6
2	(England) Ronnie O'Sullivan	6
3	(Scotland) John Higgins	3

Final; Best of 17 frames
4	(Scotland) Stephen Hendry	7
2	(England) Ronnie O'Sullivan	9
