= 1991 Junior Pot Black =

Junior Pot Black 91
Tournament information
- Dates: 18–20 August 1991 (Broadcast 20–30 August 1991)
- Venue: Trentham Gardens
- City: Stoke-on-Trent
- Country: England
- Organisation: WPBSA
- Format: Non-Ranking event
- Highest break: (England) Ronnie O'Sullivan (92)?

Final
- Champion: (England) Ronnie O'Sullivan
- Runner-up: (Republic of Ireland) Declan Murphy
- Score: 2–0

The 1991 Junior Pot Black was the fourth staging of the junior snooker tournament and the first since 1983 which was held in the Trentham Gardens at Stoke-on-Trent and was played alongside the senior competition which also got revived this year. 8 young players were competing in a knockout format. The matches are one-frame shoot-outs, a two frame aggregate score in the semi-final and best of three frames in the final.

Broadcast during school holiday mornings on BBC1 on the first week and BBC2 during the second, the series started at 11:05 on Tuesday 20 August 1991. Eamonn Holmes presented the programme with Ted Lowe and John Spencer as commentators and John Williams as referee.

Future professional players in this revived series include Ronnie O'Sullivan, Matthew Stevens and Lee Walker. O'Sullivan won the series beating Ireland's Declan Murphy 2–0 with a 92 break in the first frame.

== Main draw ==
Quarter-finals 20–23 August 1991		Semi-finals 28 and 29 August 1991		Final 30 August 1991
(England) Ronnie O'Sullivan	1
(Scotland) Evan Munro	0	(England) Ronnie O'Sullivan	1
(Northern Ireland) Gary Crawford	1	(Northern Ireland) Gary Crawford	0
(Wales) Lee Walker	0			(England) Ronnie O'Sullivan	2
(England) Daniel Buskin	0			(Republic of Ireland) Declan Murphy	0
(Wales) Matthew Stevens	1	(Wales) Matthew Stevens	0
(Republic of Ireland) Declan Murphy	1	(Republic of Ireland) Declan Murphy	1
(Scotland) Alan Burnett	0

Match dates of transmission

Player 1	Player 2	Broadcast Date
(England) Ronnie O'Sullivan	(Scotland) Evan Munro	20 August 1991
(Northern Ireland) Gary Crawford	(Wales) Lee Walker	21 August 1991
(Wales) Matthew Stevens	(England) Daniel Buskin	22 August 1991
(Republic of Ireland) Declan Murphy	(Scotland) Alan Burnett	23 August 1991
(England) Ronnie O'Sullivan	(England) Gary Crawford	28 August 1991
(Republic of Ireland) Declan Murphy	(Wales) Matthew Stevens	29 August 1991
(England) Ronnie O'Sullivan	(Republic of Ireland) Declan Murphy	30 August 1991
