= Ronnie O'Sullivan: The Edge of Everything =

2023 documentary film

- Directed by: Sam Blair
- Produced by: David Beckham; James Daniel Hunter Davidson; Milo Wilkinson-Aboud
- Starring: Ronnie O'Sullivan; Stephen Hendry; Laila Rouass; Jimmy White; Ronnie Wood
- Cinematography: Edward Edwards
- Edited by: Sam Blair; Paul Monaghan
- Music by: Roger Goula
- Production company: Studio 99
- Distributed by: MetFilms
- Release date: November 21, 2023
- Running time: 113 minutes
- Country: United Kingdom
- Language: English

Ronnie O'Sullivan: The Edge of Everything is a 2023 documentary film produced by Studio 99 and directed by Sam Blair. The film gives insights into the life of Ronnie O'Sullivan and how he managed to reach the top of professional snooker. It highlights the hardships he faced as well as how his personal life has impacted his career, and shows the mental challenges O'Sullivan had faced during the 2022 World Snooker Championship, where he won his seventh World title to equal the record set by Stephen Hendry.

== Release ==
The film was a limited theatrical release with a Q&A panel held after where the cast would answer questions from the public. On 23 November 2023, the film was released on Amazon Prime Video. The documentary was produced by Studio 99 owned by David Beckham, and was distributed by MetFilms.

== Reception ==
In a three-star review, The Guardian's Cath Clarke describes the film as portraying O'Sullivan as an "all-round nice bloke", and commented that the two hour length was not enough to describe O'Sullivan's "tortured relationship with snooker". In a review for the BBC, Ciaran Varley described the film as "a character study in addiction to snooker perfection". Varley also emphasises the film's examination of O'Sullivan's mental health and the impact of his father's murder conviction early in his career.
