= 1993 Nescafe Extra Challenge =

Nescafé Extra Challenge
Tournament information
- Dates: 8–10 January 1993
- City: Bangkok
- Country: Thailand
- Format: Non-ranking event
- Total prize fund: £30,000
- Winner's share: £10,500
- Highest break: James Wattana (THA) (102)

Final
- Champion: Ronnie O'Sullivan (ENG)
- Runner-up: James Wattana (THA)
- Score: Round-Robin

The 1993 Nescafé Extra Challenge was a professional non-ranking snooker tournament that was played in Bangkok, Thailand in January 1993. Four players participated - Alan McManus, Ronnie O'Sullivan, John Parrott and James Wattana. 17 year old O'Sullivan won the tournament to collect his first professional title. As champion, O'Sullivan received £10,500 from the total prize fund of £30,000. The tournament was played in a Round-Robin group format.

== League phase ==
If points were level then most frames won determined their positions.

POS	Player	MP	MW	ML	FW	FL	FD	PTS
Winner	Ronnie O'Sullivan (ENG)	3	2	1	13	8	+5	4
Runner-up	James Wattana (THA)	3	2	1	10	10	0	4
3	John Parrott (ENG)	3	1	2	12	13	-1	2
4	Alan McManus (SCO)	3	1	2	9	13	-4	2

- 8 January
  - Ronnie O'Sullivan 5–3 Alan McManus
  - James Wattana 5–4 John Parrott
- 9 January
  - Ronnie O'Sullivan 5–0 James Wattana
  - Alan McManus 5–3 John Parrott
- 10 January
  - James Wattana 5–1 Alan McManus
  - John Parrott 5–3 Ronnie O'Sullivan

== Century breaks ==
The following century breaks were made at the tournament.

- 102 – James Wattana
- 101 – Ronnie O'Sullivan
- 101 – John Parrott
