= 1991 Pot Black =

Pot Black 91
Tournament information
- Dates: 18–20 August 1991 (broadcast 2 September-16 October 1991)
- Venue: Trentham Gardens
- City: Stoke-on-Trent
- Country: England
- Organisation: WPBSA
- Format: Non-Ranking event
- Winner's share: £8,000
- Highest break: ???

Final
- Champion: (England) Steve Davis
- Runner-up: (Scotland) Stephen Hendry
- Score: 2–1

The 1991 Pot Black was the first of the revived professional invitational snooker tournament after a 5-year absence and the 19th series altogether. It took place between 18 and 20 August 1991 and broadcast in September and October. This time, the tournament was held at Trentham Gardens in Stoke-on-Trent which formally hosted the International and it was played alongside the Junior Pot Black competition which also got revived, and featured sixteen professional players in a knock-out system. All matches until the semi-final were one-frame shoot-outs, the semi-final was aggregate score of two frames and the final being contested over the best of three frames.

Broadcasts had been moved from primetime BBC2 to an afternoon slot on BBC1 and shown on Mondays and Wednesdays and the series started at 15:05 on Monday 2 September 1991. Eamonn Holmes was the new presenter for the series and three times Pot Black champion John Spencer joined Ted Lowe in the commentary box for the new series while John Williams remained as referee.

Players in this year's series were the top 16 ranked players for the 1991–92 season including former Pot Black winners Doug Mountjoy, Steve Davis, Terry Griffiths and defending champion Jimmy White and former Junior Pot Black players Dean Reynolds, John Parrott and Stephen Hendry.

The tournament was won by Davis who took the title for the third time, beating Hendry 2–1 and equalling John Spencer and Eddie Charlton. In the semi-finals, Davis eliminated White 164–67, and Hendry beat Mountjoy 221–31. Davis received £8,000 prize money as winner, Hendry received £5,000 as runner-up, and the losing semi-finalists each received £3,000.

== Main draw ==
Last 16
(England) Jimmy White	1
(England) Willie Thorne	0
(Northern Ireland) Dennis Taylor	1
(England) Mike Hallett	0
(England) Steve Davis	1
(England) Martin Clark	0
(England) Gary Wilkinson	1
(England) Dean Reynolds	0
(Scotland) Stephen Hendry	1
(England) Tony Jones	0
(England) Neal Foulds	1
(Wales) Terry Griffiths	0
(Wales) Doug Mountjoy	78
(England) Steve James	34
(England) John Parrott	1
(England) Tony Knowles	0

Quarter-finals
(England) Jimmy White	1
(Northern Ireland) Dennis Taylor	0
(England) Steve Davis	1
(England) Gary Wilkinson	0
(Scotland) Stephen Hendry	1
(England) Neal Foulds	0
(Wales) Doug Mountjoy	1
(England) John Parrott	0

Semi-finals; Aggregate score of 2 frames
(England) Jimmy White	67
(England) Steve Davis	164
(Scotland) Stephen Hendry	221
(Wales) Doug Mountjoy	31

Final; Best of 3 frames
(England) Steve Davis	2
(Scotland) Stephen Hendry	1

Match dates of transmission

Player 1	Player 2	Broadcast Date
(England) Jimmy White	(England) Willie Thorne	2 September 1991
(England) John Parrott	(England) Tony Knowles	4 September 1991
(Scotland) Stephen Hendry	(England) Tony Jones	9 September 1991
(England) Steve Davis	(England) Martin Clark	11 September 1991
(England) Gary Wilkinson	(England) Dean Reynolds	16 September 1991
(England) Neal Foulds	(Wales) Terry Griffiths	18 September 1991
(Wales) Doug Mountjoy	(England) Steve James	23 September 1991
(Northern Ireland) Dennis Taylor	(England) Mike Hallett	25 September 1991
(Scotland) Stephen Hendry	(England) Neal Foulds	30 September 1991
(England) Steve Davis	(England) Gary Wilkinson	2 October 1991
(England) Jimmy White	(Northern Ireland) Dennis Taylor	7 October 1991
(Wales) Doug Mountjoy	(England) John Parrott	9 October 1991
(England) Steve Davis	(England) Jimmy White	14 October 1991
(Scotland) Stephen Hendry	(Wales) Doug Mountjoy	15 October 1991
(England) Steve Davis	(Scotland) Stephen Hendry	16 October 1991

== Final ==
Final: Best of 3 frames. Referee: John Williams; Trentham Gardens, Stoke-on-Trent, England, 20 August 1991 (Broadcast 16 October 1991).
Steve Davis; England	2–1	Stephen Hendry; Scotland
62–40, 4–101 (55),80–18
??	Highest break	55
0	Century breaks	0
0	50+ breaks	1
