= Ronnie O'Sullivan =

English snooker player (born 1975)

Ronnie O'Sullivan OBE
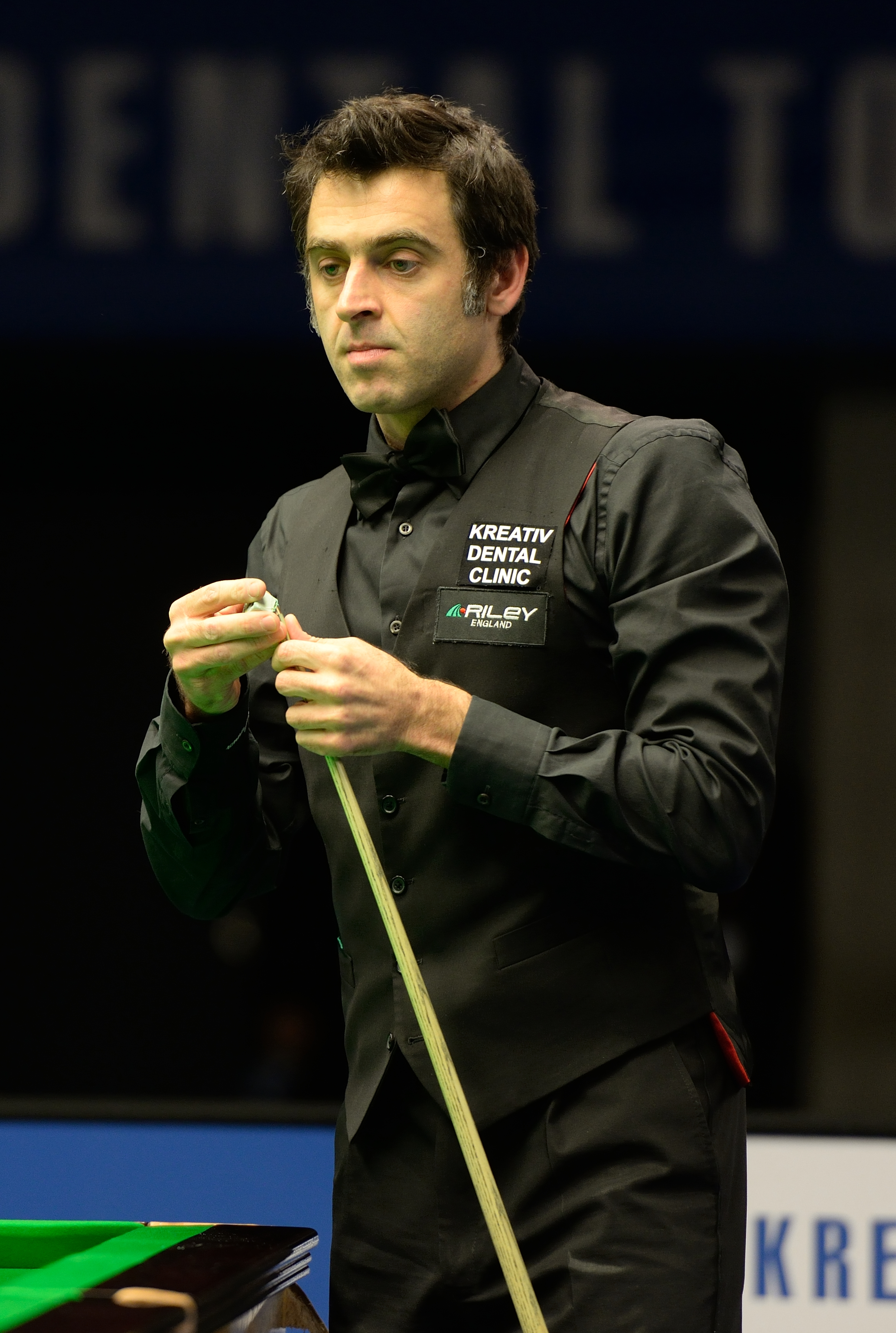
- O'Sullivan in 2015

Personal information
- Nickname: The Rocket
- Born: 5 December 1975 (age 50) Wordsley, West Midlands, England

Sport
- Country: England
- Sport: Snooker
- Professional: 1992–present
- Highest ranking: 1 (May 2002 – May 2003, May 2004 – May 2006, May 2008 – May 2010, March – August 2019, April 2022 – May 2024)
- Current ranking: 13 (as of 7 November 2026)
- Maximum breaks: 17
- Century breaks: 1,339 (as of 15 November 2026)

Tournament wins
- Ranking: 41
- Minor-ranking: 3
- World Championship: 2001; 2004; 2008; 2012; 2013; 2020; 2022

Ronald Antonio O'Sullivan (born 5 December 1975) is an English professional snooker player from Chigwell, Essex. He has won the World Snooker Championship seven times, a modern-era record he shares with Stephen Hendry. He has also won a record eight Masters and a record eight UK Championship titles, giving him 23 Triple Crown titles, more than any other player. He holds the record for the most ranking titles, with 41, and has been ranked world number one on five occasions.

After winning amateur titles including the IBSF World Under-21 Snooker Championship, O'Sullivan turned professional in 1992, aged 16. He did so alongside John Higgins and Mark Williams, and the three players are known collectively as the "Class of '92". He won the 1993 UK Championship at age 17 to become the youngest ranking-event winner, a record that still stands. He is also the youngest winner of the Masters and the oldest winner of all three Triple Crown events. He has featured at the Crucible more times than any other player, with 34 appearances as of the 2026 event.

O'Sullivan made his first competitive century break at age 10 and his first competitive maximum break at age 15. He was the first player to make 1,000 centuries in professional competition, and has since passed 1,300 centuries. He holds the record for the most officially recognised maximums in professional competition, with 17, and holds the Guinness World Record for the fastest competitive maximum, made in 5 minutes and 8 seconds at the 1997 World Championship. At the 2026 World Open, he made a 16-red clearance of 153, the highest break in professional snooker history.

O'Sullivan has experienced depression, mood swings, and drug and alcohol abuse during his career. An outspoken and controversial figure on the professional tour, he has been disciplined several times by the World Professional Billiards and Snooker Association for his behaviour and comments. Away from the table, he has worked as a television pundit and has written crime novels, autobiographies, and a health and fitness book. He is the subject of the 2023 documentary film Ronnie O'Sullivan: The Edge of Everything. He was inducted into the World Snooker Tour Hall of Fame in 2012 and was appointed OBE in the 2016 New Year Honours. In 2025, he relocated to Dubai.

== Career summary ==
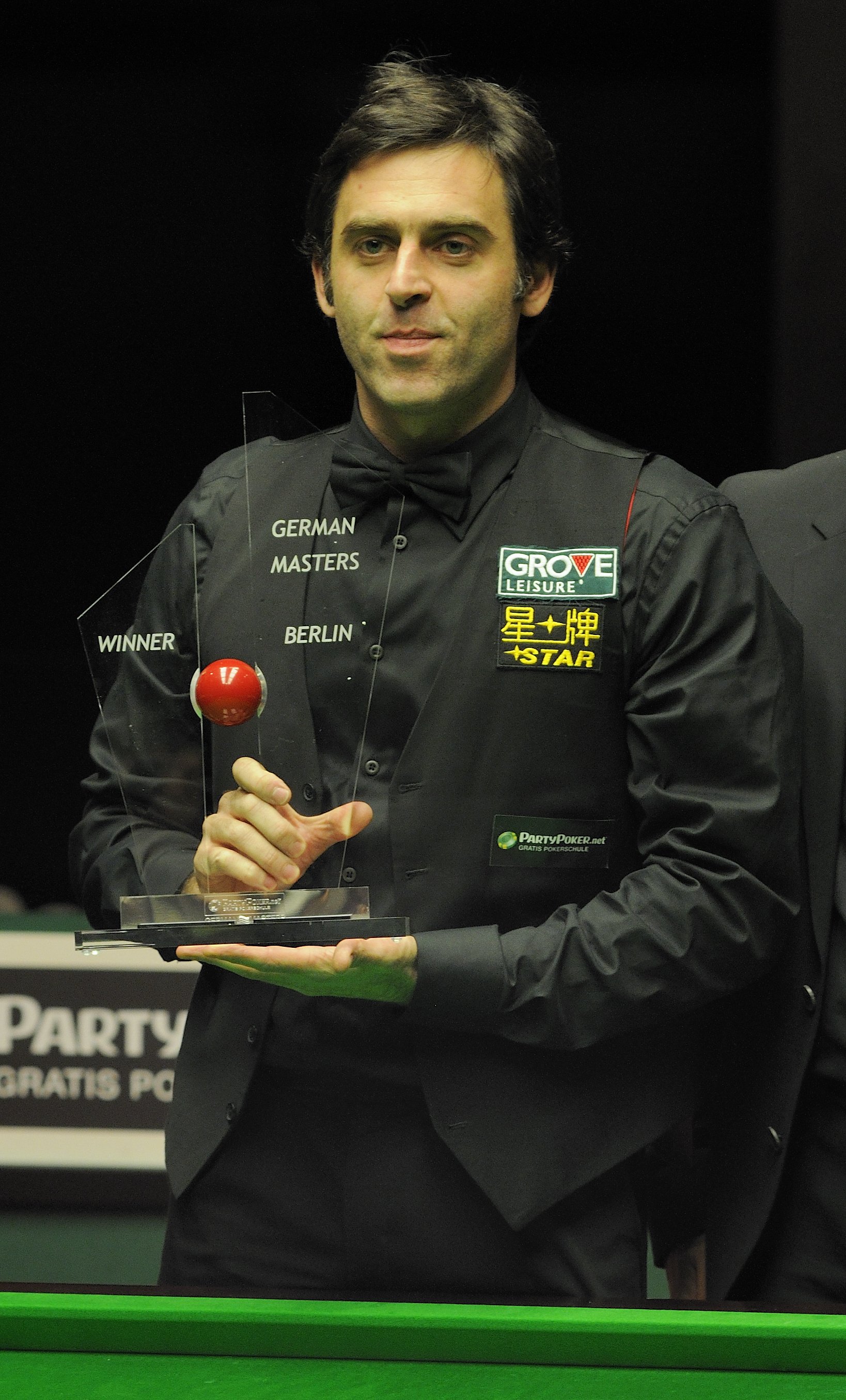
O'Sullivan with the 2012 German Masters trophy

O'Sullivan began playing snooker at age 7 and soon became a noted amateur competitor, winning his first club tournament at age 9, making his first competitive century break at age 10, and winning the British Under-16 Championship at age 13. At the 1991 English Amateur Championship, aged 15 years and 98 days, he made his first competitive maximum break, then the youngest player ever to do so in a recognised tournament. In the same year, he won the IBSF World Under-21 Snooker Championship and Junior Pot Black.

After turning professional in 1992, aged 16, he won 74 of his first 76 qualifying matches, including a record 38 consecutive professional victories. He qualified for the televised stages of the 1993 World Championship, losing 10–7 to Alan McManus on his Crucible debut. He claimed his first ranking title later that year, beating Hendry 10–6 in the final of the 1993 UK Championship seven days before his 18th birthday to become the youngest-ever winner of a ranking event, a record he still holds. In the following season, he won the 1995 Masters aged 19 years and 69 days to become the youngest Masters champion.

Between 1996 and 1999, O'Sullivan reached three World semi-finals in four years. At the 1997 World Championship, he achieved his first maximum break in professional competition. Compiled in a time of 5 minutes and 8 seconds, it remains the fastest competitive maximum break in snooker history, which is listed as a Guinness World Record. He won his second UK title later that year at the 1997 UK Championship. Despite these successes, his career also became marred by controversy in the late 1990s. During the 1996 World Championship, he assaulted an assistant press officer, for which he received a suspended two-year ban and a £20,000 fine. After winning the 1998 Irish Masters, he was stripped of his title and prize money when a post-match drug test found evidence of cannabis in his system. O'Sullivan subsequently acknowledged frequent abuse of drugs and alcohol in the early years of his career, which resulted in spells in the Priory Hospital for rehabilitation.

He reached his first World final in 2001, where he defeated John Higgins 18–14 to claim his first World title and reached number two in the world rankings. He won his third UK Championship later that year, which helped him attain the world number one ranking for the first time in the 2002–03 season. With veteran six-time World Champion Ray Reardon acting as his coach and mentor, he won his second World title in 2004, defeating Graeme Dott 18–8 in the final, after which he held the number one ranking for the next two seasons. He added his second Masters title in 2005, ten years after his first. His behaviour became notably erratic in the mid-2000s as he battled clinical depression. During the 2005 World Championship, he shaved his head mid-tournament and exhibited what The Independent called a "public emotional disintegration" while losing 11 of the last 14 frames in his quarter-final defeat against Peter Ebdon. At the 2005 UK Championship, he sat with a wet towel draped over his head during his match against Mark King. Trailing Hendry 4–1 in their best-of-17-frames quarter-final at the 2006 UK Championship, he abruptly conceded the match during the sixth frame and left the arena. Hendry was awarded the match 9–1 and O'Sullivan was fined £20,800 over the incident.

In 2007, O'Sullivan won his third Masters title and his fourth UK Championship, which was his first ranking title in almost three years. He won his third World title in 2008, defeating Ali Carter 18–8 in the final, after which he held the world number one ranking for the next two seasons. He added his fourth Masters title in 2009. After two poor seasons that saw him fall out of the top ten in the world rankings for the first time, he began working with psychiatrist Steve Peters in 2011. A resurgent O'Sullivan captured his fourth World title in 2012, defeating Carter 18–11 in the final, after which he paid tribute to Peters' work with him. In the following season, he took an extended break from the professional tour. Despite having played only one competitive match all season, he returned to the Crucible for the 2013 World Championship and successfully defended his World title, defeating Barry Hawkins 18–12 in the final. In his 2014 Masters quarter-final against Ricky Walden, he set a new record for the most points scored without reply in professional competition, with 556, and went on to beat the defending champion Mark Selby 10–4 in the final to claim his fifth Masters title. At the 2014 World Championship, he reached a third consecutive world final, where he again faced Selby. Despite taking a 10–5 lead, O'Sullivan lost 18–14, his first defeat in a world final. Later in 2014, he won his fifth UK Championship, beating Judd Trump 10–9 in the final. However, he declined to defend his title the following year and pulled out of the 2015 UK Championship, citing debilitating insomnia. At the 2015 Masters, he made his 776th century break in professional competition, surpassing Hendry's record for the most career centuries.

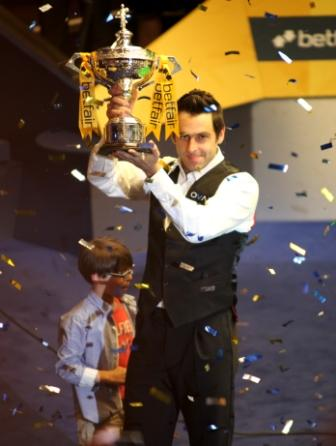
O'Sullivan after winning his fifth World title in 2013

O'Sullivan won two consecutive Masters tournaments in 2016 and 2017 for a record seven Masters titles. He also won two consecutive UK Championships in 2017 and 2018 for a record seven UK titles, attaining a total of 19 Triple Crown titles to surpass Hendry's total of 18. During the 2017–18 season, he won five ranking events. He defeated Neil Robertson 10–4 in the final to win the 2019 Players Championship. In the last frame of the match, he made his 1,000th century break in professional competition, becoming the first player to reach that milestone. He won his 36th ranking title at the 2019 Tour Championship, equalling Hendry's record and attaining the world number one ranking for the first time since May 2010.

At the 2020 World Championship, O'Sullivan came from 14 to 16 behind in the semi-final against Selby to win 17–16. He then defeated Kyren Wilson 18–8 in the final to win his sixth world title. The tournament marked his 28th consecutive Crucible appearance, surpassing Hendry's record of 27 consecutive appearances. He reached his 58th ranking final at the 2021 Tour Championship, breaking Hendry's record of 57 ranking final appearances, but lost 10–4 to Neil Robertson. During the tournament, he made his 1,100th century break in professional competition. He lost five consecutive ranking finals in the 2020–21 season, but ended a 16-month title drought by winning his 38th ranking title at the 2021 World Grand Prix.

O'Sullivan defeated Trump 18–13 in the 2022 World Championship final to win his seventh world title, equalling Hendry for the most world titles in the modern era. Aged 46 years and 148 days, he became the oldest World Champion in snooker history, surpassing Reardon, who won his last title in 1978 aged 45 years and 203 days. O'Sullivan also surpassed Hendry's record of 70 Crucible wins, setting a new record of 74.

O'Sullivan defeated Marco Fu 6–4 to win the 2022 Hong Kong Masters. The final was played before an estimated 9,000 spectators, the largest audience ever to attend a snooker match. At the 2023 World Snooker Championship, O'Sullivan made a record 31st Crucible appearance, surpassing the previous record of 30 by Steve Davis. He made his 200th Crucible century break and his 1,200th century in professional competition during his second-round match against Hossein Vafaei. His reached the quarter-final, becoming the first player to compete in 100 matches at the Crucible, but lost 10–13 to eventual winner Luca Brecel.

At the invitational 2023 Shanghai Masters, O'Sullivan defeated Brecel 11–9 in the final to claim his fourth consecutive, and fifth total, Shanghai Masters title, extending his winning streak at the tournament to 18 matches since 2017. He won record-extending eighth titles at both the 2023 UK Championship and the 2024 Masters, respectively defeating Ding Junhui and Ali Carter 10–7 in the finals. This extended his record number of ranking titles to 40 and Triple Crown titles to 23. Aged 47 years and 363 days when he won the UK Championship, and 48 years and 40 days when he won the Masters, he became the oldest winner of all three Triple Crown events. He also became simultaneously the youngest and oldest winner of both the UK Championship and the Masters. He won his 41st ranking title at the 2024 World Grand Prix with a 10–7 victory over Trump in the final, and went on to win the invitational 2024 World Masters of Snooker, the first professional snooker tournament held in Saudi Arabia, defeating Brecel 5–2 in the final. He signed a three-year ambassadorial deal with Saudi Arabia, which requires him to play in all World Snooker Tour events staged in that country, to establish a snooker academy in the Middle East, and to contribute to the development of the sport in the region. At the 2024 Shanghai Masters, O'Sullivan lost 3–10 to Trump in the semi-finals, his first defeat at the tournament since 2016, after 20 consecutive match wins.

During the 2024–25 snooker season, O'Sullivan withdrew from nine tournaments, including the 2025 Masters, the 2025 German Masters, the 2025 Welsh Open, and the 2025 World Grand Prix. He returned to competition at the 2025 World Championship after a three-month break. At the 2025 Saudi Arabia Snooker Masters, he made his 16th and 17th official maximum breaks in his semi-final match against Chris Wakelin. He became the second player, after Jackson Page, to make two maximums in the same match, and the first to do so in a one-session match or on the same day. At the age of 49 years and 253 days, he became the oldest player to record an official maximum. He won a £147,000 bonus for making the two breaks in one of the four major tournaments of the season. In his quarter-final match against Ryan Day at the 2026 World Open, O'Sullivan made the highest break in professional snooker history, a 16-red clearance of 153. It was only the second time that a break exceeding 147 had been made in professional competition, following a 148 by Jamie Burnett in 2004.

O'Sullivan's other career highlights include three World Grand Prix titles, two Players Championship titles, four Welsh Open titles, two Scottish Open titles, two German Masters titles, four Irish Masters titles, two China Open titles, two Champions Cup titles, ten Premier League titles, four Champion of Champions titles, three Scottish Masters titles, and five Shanghai Masters titles.

== Playing style ==
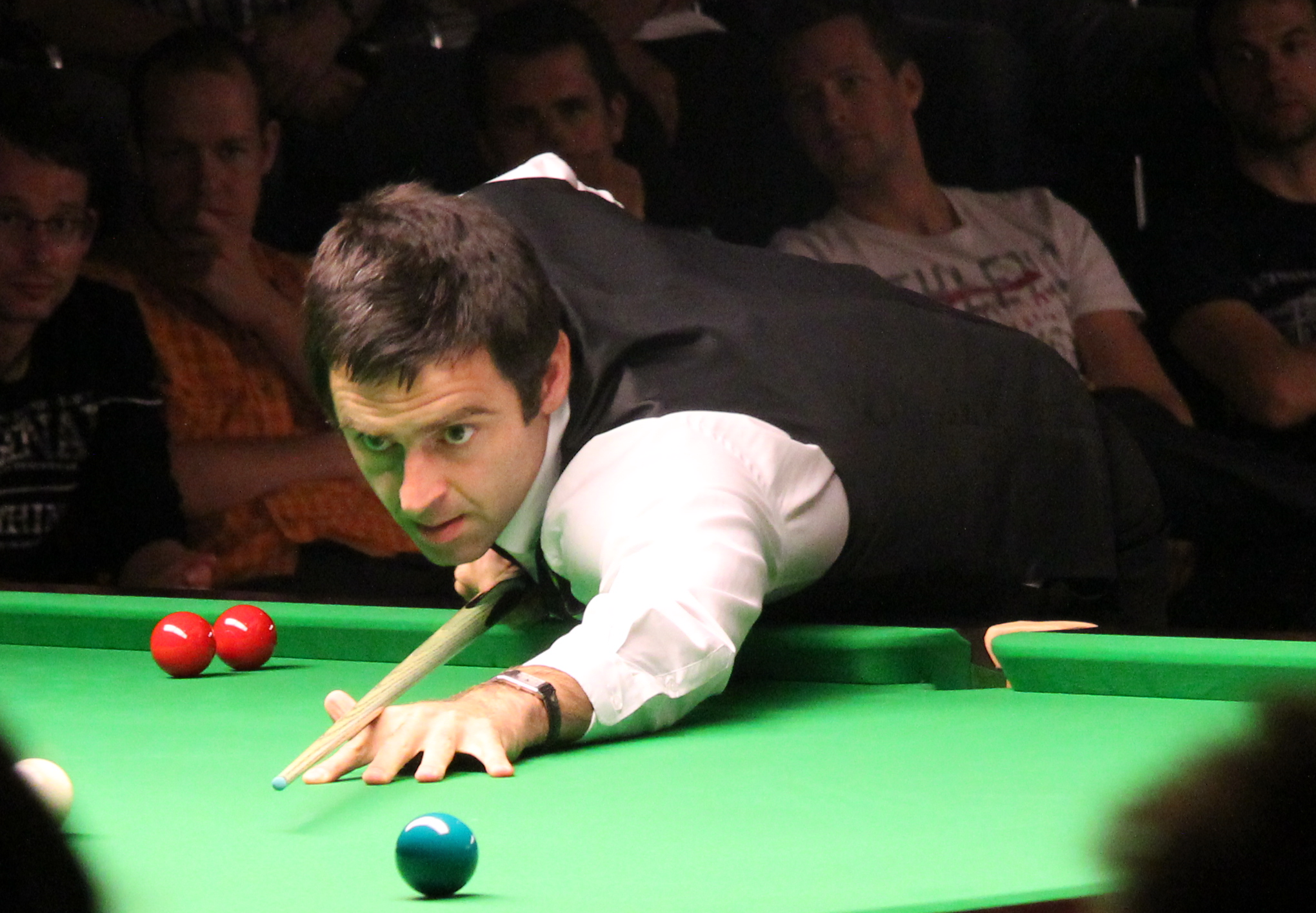
O'Sullivan during the 2011 Paul Hunter Classic

Known for his fast and attacking style of play, O'Sullivan gained the nickname "The Rocket" after winning a best-of-nine frame match in a record 43 minutes during his debut season as a professional. A prolific break builder and great tactical player, he has stated his disdain for long, drawn-out games, saying that they harm the game of snooker. O'Sullivan is ambidextrous, as he is right-handed but can play to a high standard with his left hand and routinely alternates when needed, enabling him to attempt shots with his left hand that would otherwise require a rest or spider. When he first displayed this left-handed ability in the 1996 World Championship against Alain Robidoux, the Canadian accused him of disrespect and refused to shake hands after the match.

== Status ==
O'Sullivan is highly regarded in snooker, with several of his peers regarding him as the greatest player ever, and some labelling him a "genius". After losing 17–6 to O'Sullivan in the 2008 World Championship semi-final, Hendry described him as "the best player in the world by a country mile". In 2024, Hendry agreed that there was no longer any question as to whether O'Sullivan was the greatest snooker player of all time, also calling him an "artist". However, O'Sullivan has dismissed the suggestion that he is the greatest player and has identified Hendry as the greatest due to his domination of snooker.

One of the most popular players on the circuit, he is noted for being a "showman", and is credited with helping improve the image of snooker with the general public. He has often been compared with Alex Higgins and Jimmy White for his natural talent and popularity. In December 2020, O'Sullivan was nominated for the BBC's Sports Personality of the Year Award, becoming the first snooker player to receive a nomination since Hendry in 1990. He was nominated for a second time in December 2022.

O'Sullivan sometimes lacks confidence or interest, and has performed inconsistently throughout his career, with observers noting the "two Ronnies" aspect of his character.

He has received praise from athletes in other sports. Tennis player Novak Djokovic called him "one of the sport greats".

== Criticisms of snooker ==
After Barry Hearn took charge of World Snooker in 2010, O'Sullivan became a vocal critic of how Hearn reconfigured the professional tour. He took issue with increased travel expectations, flat 128 draws that required top professionals to play more rounds against lower-ranked opponents, reduced prize money for maximum breaks, and tournament venues he saw as inadequate. He accused snooker's governing body WPBSA of bullying and intimidating him, said that Hearn was running a "dictatorship", protested alleged mistreatment by snooker's authorities by giving robotic or monosyllabic responses in interviews, and refused opportunities to make maximum breaks in apparent protest over inadequate prize money for the achievement. In 2018, he threatened to form a breakaway snooker tour akin to the split in darts.

During the 2020 World Championship, O'Sullivan publicly criticised the standard of new players coming into snooker, stating that he would have to "lose an arm and a leg to fall out of the top 50". He was also critical of the tournament organisers' decision to allow fans into the final during the COVID-19 pandemic.

In 2021, O'Sullivan claimed on a podcast interview that most snooker players had wasted their lives. He called snooker a "bad sport" that can cause "a lot of damage", suggesting that the antisocial nature of solitary practice in a darkened environment can stunt players' personal development. He stated that he would not support his own children if they chose to become snooker players, and said that if he could live his sporting career over again, he would pursue golf or Formula One instead.

== Other endeavours ==
=== Broadcasting ===
Eurosport signed an exclusive deal with O'Sullivan in March 2014 to make him its global ambassador for snooker, with the goal of driving its international appeal. As part of this deal, O'Sullivan created a special snooker series for the network called The Ronnie O'Sullivan Show, which included his insights into the game, interviews with other professional players, and playing tips. He also wrote for Yahoo! websites and mobile apps during the 2014 World Championship. He frequently appears as a pundit on Eurosport's snooker coverage, alongside Jimmy White and Neal Foulds.

In 2015 and 2016, O'Sullivan co-hosted the Midweek Matchzone show with Chris Hood on Brentwood radio station Phoenix FM. In 2017, he starred in miniseries Ronnie O'Sullivan's American Hustle with broadcasting friend Matt Smith, in which the pair toured different cities in the United States learning the art of pool hustling.

=== Author ===
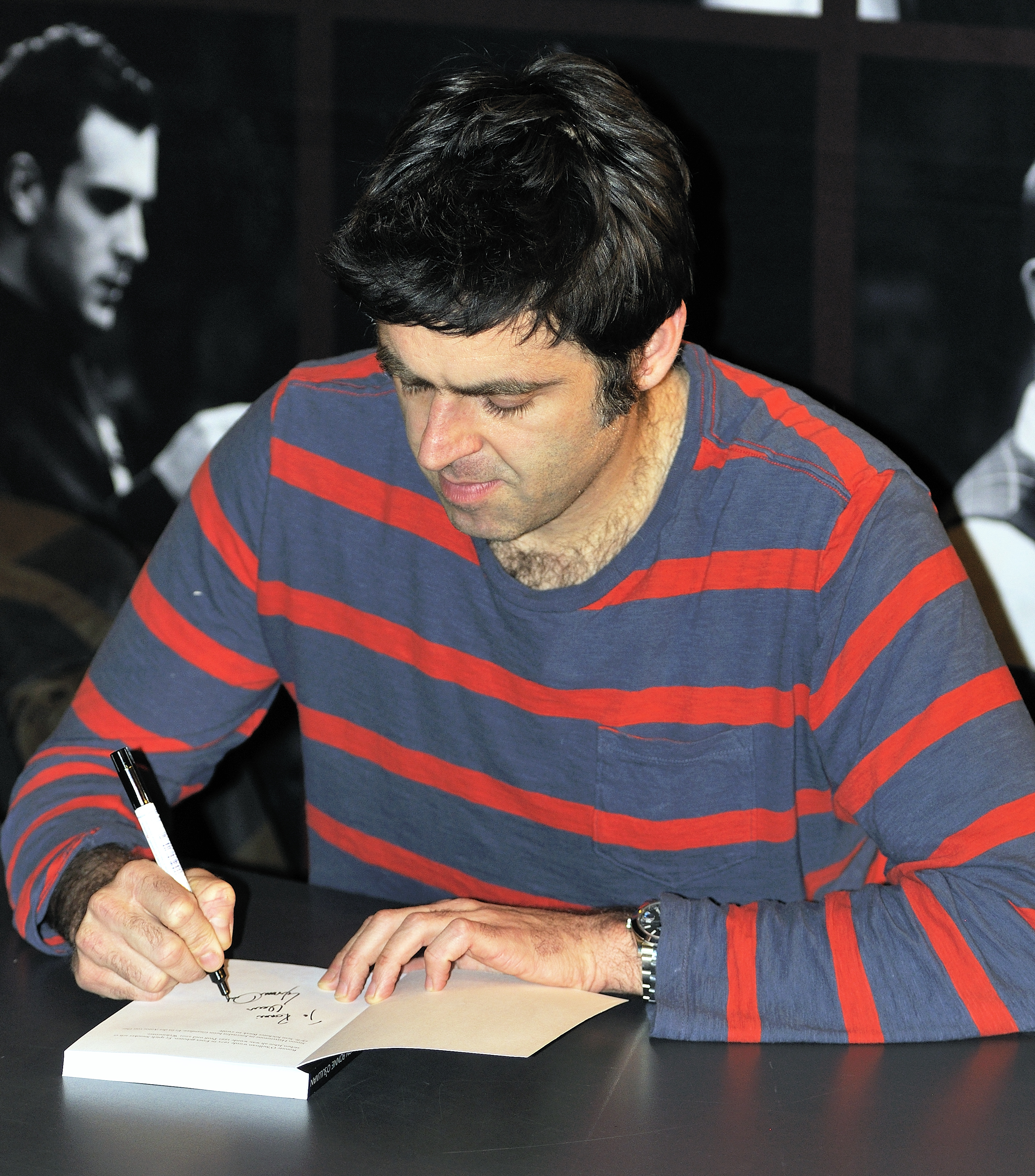
O'Sullivan at a 2014 book signing

O'Sullivan has written three crime novels in collaboration with author Emlyn Rees: Framed (2016), Double Kiss (2017), and The Break (2018). Although the novels are not autobiographical, they are loosely based on his early experiences and family life. He has also written two autobiographies. His first, Ronnie: The Autobiography of Ronnie O'Sullivan, was published in 2003; and his second, Running: The Autobiography, was published in 2013. He has also co-authored a health and fitness book with nutritionist Rhiannon Lambert entitled Top of Your Game: Eating for Mind and Body. Published in 2019, it contains healthy recipes and advice for "living better, eating healthier and feeding your brain to enhance your performance".

=== Video games ===
O'Sullivan has been involved with several video games, including Virtual Snooker (1996), World Snooker Championship 2007 (2007), and Ronnie O'Sullivan's Snooker for PlayStation Portable (2012).

=== Documentary film ===
A documentary film titled Ronnie O'Sullivan: The Edge of Everything was produced by David Beckham's production company Studio 99, directed by filmmaker Sam Blair, and distributed by MetFilms. The film premiered in London on 21 November 2023, and was released on Amazon Prime Video on 23 November. It highlighted the hardships he faced as a professional at the highest level of snooker, as well as how his personal life had impacted his career.

=== Snooker course ===
In October 2023, O'Sullivan launched an online snooker course entitled The Rocket Method, where he provides in-depth lessons on the game for a subscription fee. Assisted by Alan McManus, the course contains 12 episodes, each an hour in length, of which the final batch of episodes was released in March 2024. The course has a cinematic production and was directed by Oscar-nominated director Gregg Helvey, and episodes are available in English and Mandarin Chinese.

== Personal life ==
O'Sullivan was born on 5 December 1975 in Wordsley, West Midlands, the son of Ronald John and Maria (née Catalano) O'Sullivan, who ran a string of sex shops in the Soho area of London. His mother is originally from Sicily, and O'Sullivan spent childhood holidays in the village near Agrigento where she grew up. He was brought up in the Manor Road area of Chigwell, Essex, where he lived for some years and attended Wanstead High School. As of mid-2024, he lived in the adjoining area of Chingford and Woodford Green. He is a first cousin of snooker player Maria Catalano, who has been ranked number one in the women's game. In 1992 his father was sentenced to life in prison for murder and was released in 2010 after serving 18 years. His mother was sentenced to a year in prison for tax evasion in 1996, leaving O'Sullivan to care for his eight-year-old sister Danielle. In 1995 he was banned from driving for a year and fined £1,200, as he returned from the International Open, in Bournemouth, after defeat in the last 16.

O'Sullivan has three children: a daughter from a two-year relationship with Sally Magnus, as well as a son and a daughter from a relationship with Jo Langley, whom he met at Narcotics Anonymous. He became a grandfather in October 2018 after his daughter with Sally Magnus gave birth to a daughter. He began dating actress Laila Rouass in 2012, and became engaged to her in 2013. Rouass announced on social media in February 2022 that they had ended their ten-year relationship. The couple later reconciled, but in September 2024 were reported to have broken up again. They reconciled again in January 2025 and, in June of that year, they married at St George's Town Hall in Shadwell, East London.

O'Sullivan is known for his perfectionism and for being highly self-critical, even in victory. Early in his career, he was treated for drug-related issues and bouts of depression. Since 2011, psychiatrist and sports psychologist Steve Peters, a close friend, has helped him overcome his mood swings. He is also a close friend of artist Damien Hirst. Noted for repeatedly declaring his intention to retire, O'Sullivan took an extended break from the professional snooker tour during the 2012–13 season, during which he worked on a pig farm for several weeks. He enjoys running, and has achieved a personal best of 34 minutes and 54 seconds for 10 km races, which ranked him in the top 1,500 10 km runners in the UK in 2008. O'Sullivan has plantar fasciitis, which led to him being granted an exemption from wearing the otherwise mandatory black leather shoes when playing snooker.

He enjoys cooking, and appeared on the BBC's Saturday Kitchen in December 2014 and February 2021. He also enjoys motor racing, and has appeared on series 4 of Top Gear. He is a supporter of Arsenal F.C.

Despite a self-professed interest in Islam, O'Sullivan denied media reports that said he had converted to the religion in 2003. He has also espoused an interest in Buddhism, having spent many lunchtimes at the London Buddhist Centre in Bethnal Green. He has said he does not have a firm commitment to any religion.

O'Sullivan was made an OBE in the New Year Honours list in 2016, for services to snooker.

O'Sullivan was a supporter of the Labour Party during the leadership of Jeremy Corbyn, but in June 2024, he endorsed Faiza Shaheen, the independent candidate for Chingford and Woodford Green, in the 2024 general election.

In June 2023 he was a guest for BBC Radio 4's Desert Island Discs. An extended version of the programme was broadcast in October 2024. His book choice was Running with the Kenyans by Adharanand Finn, his luxury item was a painting set and his favourite disc was "That's All" by Genesis.

On 31 October 2024, O'Sullivan obtained Hong Kong residency under the Quality Migrant Admission Scheme. In 2025, he moved to Dubai.

== Performance and rankings timeline ==
Tournament	1992/ 93	1993/ 94	1994/ 95	1995/ 96	1996/ 97	1997/ 98	1998/ 99	1999/ 00	2000/ 01	2001/ 02	2002/ 03	2003/ 04	2004/ 05	2005/ 06	2006/ 07	2007/ 08	2008/ 09	2009/ 10	2010/ 11	2011/ 12	2012/ 13	2013/ 14	2014/ 15	2015/ 16	2016/ 17	2017/ 18	2018/ 19	2019/ 20	2020/ 21	2021/ 22	2022/ 23	2023/ 24	2024/ 25	2025/ 26	2026/ 27
Ranking	(Note: New players on the Main Tour do not have a ranking)	57	9	3	8	7	3	4	4	2	1	3	1	1	3	5	1	1	3	11	9	19	4	5	10	14	2	1	2	3	1	1	5	5	14
Ranking tournaments
Championship League	Tournament Not Held															Non-Ranking Event													WD	WD	2R	WD	RR	A	A
China Open (Note: The event was called the China International (1997/1998–1998/1999))	Tournament Not Held					NR	2R	W	W	QF	Not Held		WD	1R	SF	1R	QF	1R	1R	QF	A	A	WD	A	2R	1R	A	Tournament Not Held							2R
Wuhan Open	Tournament Not Held																															QF	WD	WD	SF
British Open	LQ	W	F	SF	1R	QF	3R	SF	QF	SF	2R	F	SF	Tournament Not Held																A	LQ	WD	WD	WD	WD
English Open	Tournament Not Held																								3R	W	SF	4R	3R	SF	2R	3R	1R	A	WD
Shenzhen Open (Note: The event was called the Xi'an Grand Prix (2024/2025–2025/2026))	Tournament Not Held																																SF	QF	LQ
Northern Ireland Open	Tournament Not Held																								4R	3R	F	F	F	3R	1R	WD	WD	A	1R
International Championship	Tournament Not Held																				WD	2R	QF	A	3R	1R	A	A	Not Held			SF	2R	2R	WD
UK Championship	2R	W	QF	QF	1R	W	A	QF	SF	W	QF	SF	1R	1R	QF	W	2R	SF	1R	2R	A	QF	W	A	F	W	W	4R	2R	QF	QF	W	1R	1R	
Shoot Out	Tournament Not Held																		Non-Ranking Event						A	A	A	2R	A	A	A	A	A	A	
Scottish Open (Note: The event was called the International Open (1992/1993–1996/1997) and the Players Championship (2003/2004))	2R	LQ	3R	1R	QF	W	2R	W	1R	1R	2R	QF	Tournament Not Held								MR	Not Held			QF	QF	WD	QF	F	SF	2R	WD	WD	A	
German Masters (Note: The event was called the German Open (1995/1996–1997/1998))	Not Held			1R	W	SF	NR	Tournament Not Held											WD	W	A	LQ	QF	LQ	1R	WD	A	A	A	LQ	WD	WD	WD	1R	
Welsh Open	2R	2R	QF	2R	2R	3R	SF	3R	2R	2R	QF	W	W	1R	QF	F	2R	SF	1R	SF	A	W	3R	W	2R	QF	3R	SF	F	3R	QF	WD	WD	A	
World Grand Prix	Tournament Not Held																						NR	1R	2R	W	1R	QF	SF	W	2R	W	WD	2R	
Players Championship (Note: The event was called the Players Tour Championship Grand Final (2010/2011–2015/2016))	Tournament Not Held																		DNQ	WD	DNQ	2R	DNQ	DNQ	QF	W	W	DNQ	F	QF	DNQ	QF	DNQ	A	
World Open (Note: The event was called the Grand Prix (1992/1993–2000/2001 and 2004/2005–2009/2010) and the LG Cup (2001/2002–2003/2004))	1R	1R	QF	1R	2R	2R	3R	QF	F	QF	QF	2R	W	F	QF	F	QF	2R	F	WD	A	A	Not Held		A	A	A	LQ	Not Held			3R	WD	F	
Tour Championship	Tournament Not Held																										W	DNQ	F	SF	DNQ	F	DNQ	A	
World Championship	1R	2R	QF	SF	2R	SF	SF	1R	W	SF	1R	W	QF	SF	QF	W	2R	QF	QF	W	W	F	QF	2R	QF	2R	1R	W	2R	W	QF	QF	SF	2R	
Non-ranking tournaments
Shanghai Masters	Tournament Not Held															Ranking Event											W	W	Not Held			W	SF	QF	2R
Champion of Champions	Tournament Not Held																					W	W	WD	F	F	W	SF	QF	QF	W	WD	1R	A	1R
Riyadh Season Championship (Note: The event was called the World Masters of Snooker (2023/2024))	Tournament Not Held																															W	SF	2R	
The Masters	WDQ	WR	W	F	F	QF	QF	QF	1R	QF	QF	F	W	F	W	1R	W	F	1R	QF	A	W	SF	W	W	QF	F	A	QF	QF	QF	W	WD	WD	
Championship League	Tournament Not Held															A	A	RR	WD	A	A	A	WD	F	A	A	A	2R	WD	RR	WD	WD	WD	A	
Former ranking tournaments
Asian Classic (Note: The event was called the Dubai Classic (1992/1993-1994/1995) and the Thailand Classic (1995/1996))	LQ	SF	SF	1R	W	Tournament Not Held																													
Malta Grand Prix	Not Held		Non-Ranking Event					QF	NR	Tournament Not Held																									
Thailand Masters (Note: The event was called the Asian Open (1992/1993) and the Thailand Open (1993/1994–1996/1997))	2R	1R	F	2R	SF	2R	1R	2R	2R	SF	NR	Not Held			NR	Tournament Not Held																			
Irish Masters	Non-Ranking Event										W	QF	W	NH	NR	Tournament Not Held																			
Northern Ireland Trophy	Tournament Not Held													NR	F	QF	W	Tournament Not Held																	
Shanghai Masters	Tournament Not Held															WD	F	W	WD	2R	A	A	1R	A	2R	W	Non-Ranking		Not Held			Non-Ranking Event			
China Championship	Tournament Not Held																								NR	QF	A	A	Tournament Not Held						
WST Pro Series	Tournament Not Held																												RR	Tournament Not Held					
Gibraltar Open	Tournament Not Held																							A	A	A	A	A	WD	1R	Tournament Not Held				
WST Classic	Tournament Not Held																														WD	Not Held			
European Masters (Note: The event was called the European Open (1992/1993–1996/1997 and 2001/2002–2003/2004), the Irish Open (1998/1999) and the Malta Cup (2004/2005–2007/2008))	QF	F	SF	1R	1R	NH	1R	Not Held		QF	W	QF	2R	A	1R	NR	Tournament Not Held								F	A	WD	A	2R	F	WD	WD	Not Held		
Saudi Arabia Masters	Tournament Not Held																																QF	F	NH
Former non-ranking tournaments
Nescafe Extra Challenge	W	Tournament Not Held																																	
Belgian Masters	SF	Not Held		A	Tournament Not Held																														
Superstar International	Tournament Not Held					W	Tournament Not Held																												
China International	Tournament Not Held					SF	Ranking Event				Not Held		Ranking Event															Tournament Not Held							
Millennium Cup	Tournament Not Held							F	Tournament Not Held																										
Pontins Professional	A	A	QF	A	A	A	A	A	Tournament Not Held																										
Champions Cup (Note: The event was called the Charity Challenge (1994/1995–1998/1999))	Not Held		QF	W	F	F	F	SF	W	RR	Tournament Not Held																								
Scottish Masters	A	A	SF	SF	QF	QF	W	QF	W	F	W	Tournament Not Held																							
Northern Ireland Trophy	Tournament Not Held													1R	Ranking Event			Tournament Not Held																	
Irish Masters	A	QF	1R	QF	SF	DQ	QF	SF	W	QF	Ranking Event			NH	W	Tournament Not Held																			
Euro-Asia Masters Challenge	Tournament Not Held											A	Not Held			RR	Tournament Not Held																		
Pot Black	QF	A	Tournament Not Held											QF	A	A	Tournament Not Held																		
Benson & Hedges Championship	MR	W	A	A	A	A	A	A	A	A	A	A	A	NH	A	A	A	A	Tournament Not Held																
Power Snooker	Tournament Not Held																		W	F	Tournament Not Held														
Premier League (Note: The event was called the European League (1992/1993–1996/1997))	RR	RR	RR	RR	W	RR	SF	SF	W	W	SF	A	W	W	W	W	W	F	W	W	A	Tournament Not Held													
World Grand Prix	Tournament Not Held																						F	Ranking Event											
Shoot Out	Tournament Not Held																		SF	A	A	A	2R	A	Ranking Event										
Hong Kong Masters	Tournament Not Held																									F	Tournament Not Held				W	Tournament Not Held			
Six-red World Championship (Note: The event was called the Six-red Snooker International (2008/2009) and the Six-red World Grand Prix (2009/2010))	Tournament Not Held																A	A	NH	A	A	A	A	A	A	A	A	A	Not Held		2R	Tournament Not Held			

Performance Table Legend
W	won the tournament	F	lost in the final	SF	lost in the semi–finals
QF	lost in the quarter-finals	#R	lost in the early rounds of the tournament (WR = Wildcard round, RR = Round robin)	LQ	lost in the qualifying draw
DNQ	did not qualify for the tournament	WD	withdrew from the tournament	WDQ	withdrew from the qualifying tournament
A	did not participate in the tournament	DQ	disqualified from the tournament		
NH	Not Held	event was not held			
NR	Non-Ranking Event	event is/was no longer a ranking event	R	Ranking Event	event is/was a ranking event
MR	Minor-Ranking Event	event is/was a minor-ranking event	PA	Pro–am Event	event is/was a pro–am event

== Career finals ==
=== Ranking finals: 66 (41 titles) ===
Legend
World Championship (7–1)
UK Championship (8–1)
Other (26–22)

Outcome	No.	Year	Championship	Opponent	Score	Ref.
Winner	1.	1993	UK Championship	(Scotland) Stephen Hendry	10–6	
Runner-up	1.	1993	European Open	(Scotland) Stephen Hendry	5–9	
Winner	2.	1994	British Open	(Thailand) James Wattana	9–4	
Runner-up	2.	1995	Thailand Open	(Thailand) James Wattana	6–9	
Runner-up	3.	1995	British Open	(Scotland) John Higgins	6–9	
Winner	3.	1996	Asian Classic	(England) Brian Morgan	9–8	
Winner	4.	1996	German Open	(Canada) Alain Robidoux	9–7	
Winner	5.	1997	UK Championship (2)	(Scotland) Stephen Hendry	10–6	
Winner	6.	1998	Scottish Open	(Scotland) John Higgins	9–5	
Winner	7.	1999	China Open	(England) Stephen Lee	9–2	
Winner	8.	2000	Scottish Open (2)	(Wales) Mark Williams	9–1	
Runner-up	4.	2000	Grand Prix	(Wales) Mark Williams	5–9	
Winner	9.	2000	China Open (2)	(Wales) Mark Williams	9–3	
Winner	10.	2001	World Championship	(Scotland) John Higgins	18–14	
Winner	11.	2001	UK Championship (3)	(Republic of Ireland) Ken Doherty	10–1	
Winner	12.	2003	European Open	(Scotland) Stephen Hendry	9–6	
Winner	13.	2003	Irish Masters	(Scotland) John Higgins	10–9	
Runner-up	5.	2003	British Open (2)	(Scotland) Stephen Hendry	6–9	
Winner	14.	2004	Welsh Open	(England) Steve Davis	9–8	
Winner	15.	2004	World Championship (2)	(Scotland) Graeme Dott	18–8	
Winner	16.	2004	Grand Prix	(England) Ian McCulloch	9–5	
Winner	17.	2005	Welsh Open (2)	(Scotland) Stephen Hendry	9–8	
Winner	18.	2005	Irish Masters (2)	(Wales) Matthew Stevens	10–8	
Runner-up	6.	2005	Grand Prix (2)	(Scotland) John Higgins	2–9	
Runner-up	7.	2006	Northern Ireland Trophy	(China) Ding Junhui	6–9	
Runner-up	8.	2007	Grand Prix (3)	(Hong Kong) Marco Fu	6–9	
Winner	19.	2007	UK Championship (4)	(Scotland) Stephen Maguire	10–2	
Runner-up	9.	2008	Welsh Open	(England) Mark Selby	8–9	
Winner	20.	2008	World Championship (3)	(England) Ali Carter	18–8	
Winner	21.	2008	Northern Ireland Trophy	(England) Dave Harold	9–3	
Runner-up	10.	2008	Shanghai Masters	(England) Ricky Walden	8–10	
Winner	22.	2009	Shanghai Masters	(China) Liang Wenbo	10–5	
Runner-up	11.	2010	World Open (4)	(Australia) Neil Robertson	1–5	
Winner	23.	2012	German Masters (2)	(Scotland) Stephen Maguire	9–7	
Winner	24.	2012	World Championship (4)	(England) Ali Carter	18–11	
Winner	25.	2013	World Championship (5)	(England) Barry Hawkins	18–12	
Winner	26.	2014	Welsh Open (3)	(China) Ding Junhui	9–3	
Runner-up	12.	2014	World Championship	(England) Mark Selby	14–18	
Winner	27.	2014	UK Championship (5)	(England) Judd Trump	10–9	
Winner	28.	2016	Welsh Open (4)	(Australia) Neil Robertson	9–5	
Runner-up	13.	2016	European Masters	(England) Judd Trump	8–9	
Runner-up	14.	2016	UK Championship	(England) Mark Selby	7–10	
Winner	29.	2017	English Open	(England) Kyren Wilson	9–2	
Winner	30.	2017	Shanghai Masters (2)	(England) Judd Trump	10–3	
Winner	31.	2017	UK Championship (6)	(England) Shaun Murphy	10–5	
Winner	32.	2018	World Grand Prix	(China) Ding Junhui	10–3	
Winner	33.	2018	Players Championship	(England) Shaun Murphy	10–4	
Runner-up	15.	2018	Northern Ireland Open	(England) Judd Trump	7–9	
Winner	34.	2018	UK Championship (7)	(Northern Ireland) Mark Allen	10–6	
Winner	35.	2019	Players Championship (2)	(Australia) Neil Robertson	10–4	
Winner	36.	2019	Tour Championship	(Australia) Neil Robertson	13–11	
Runner-up	16.	2019	Northern Ireland Open (2)	(England) Judd Trump	7–9	
Winner	37.	2020	World Championship (6)	(England) Kyren Wilson	18–8	
Runner-up	17.	2020	Northern Ireland Open (3)	(England) Judd Trump	7–9	
Runner-up	18.	2020	Scottish Open	(England) Mark Selby	3–9	
Runner-up	19.	2021	Welsh Open (2)	(Northern Ireland) Jordan Brown	8–9	
Runner-up	20.	2021	Players Championship	(Scotland) John Higgins	3–10	
Runner-up	21.	2021	Tour Championship	(Australia) Neil Robertson	4–10	
Winner	38.	2021	World Grand Prix (2)	(Australia) Neil Robertson	10–8	
Runner-up	22.	2022	European Masters (2)	(China) Fan Zhengyi	9–10	
Winner	39.	2022	World Championship (7)	(England) Judd Trump	18–13	
Winner	40.	2023	UK Championship (8)	(China) Ding Junhui	10–7	
Winner	41.	2024	World Grand Prix (3)	(England) Judd Trump	10–7	
Runner-up	23.	2024	Tour Championship (2)	(Wales) Mark Williams	5–10	
Runner-up	24.	2025	Saudi Arabia Snooker Masters	(Australia) Neil Robertson	9–10	
Runner-up	25.	2026	World Open	(Thailand) Thepchaiya Un-Nooh	7–10	

=== Minor-ranking finals: 6 (3 titles) ===
Outcome	No.	Year	Championship	Opponent	Score	Ref.
Runner-up	1.	2010	Players Tour Championship – Event 4	(England) Barry Pinches	3–4	
Winner	1.	2011	Players Tour Championship – Event 1	(England) Joe Perry	4–0	
Winner	2.	2011	Kay Suzanne Memorial Trophy	(Wales) Matthew Stevens	4–2	
Runner-up	2.	2011	Antwerp Open	(England) Judd Trump	3–4	
Winner	3.	2013	Paul Hunter Classic	(Northern Ireland) Gerard Greene	4–0	
Runner-up	3.	2013	Antwerp Open (2)	(England) Mark Selby	3–4	

=== Non-ranking finals: 61 (42 titles) ===
Legend
The Masters (8–6)
Champion of Champions (4–2)
Premier League (10–1)
Other (20–9)
Disqualified (1)

Outcome	No.	Year	Championship	Opponent	Score	Ref.
Winner	1.	1993	Nescafe Extra Challenge	(Thailand) James Wattana	RR	
Winner	2.	1993	Benson and Hedges Championship	(Scotland) John Lardner	9–6	
Winner	3.	1993	Scottish Challenge	(Scotland) John Higgins	6–5	
Winner	4.	1995	The Masters	(Scotland) John Higgins	9–3	
Runner-up	1.	1995	Tenball	(England) Jimmy White	1–3	
Winner	5.	1996	Charity Challenge	(Scotland) John Higgins	9–6	
Runner-up	2.	1996	The Masters	(Scotland) Stephen Hendry	5–10	
Runner-up	3.	1997	Charity Challenge	(Scotland) Stephen Hendry	8–9	
Runner-up	4.	1997	The Masters (2)	(England) Steve Davis	8–10	
Winner	6.	1997	European League	(Scotland) Stephen Hendry	10–8	
Winner	7.	1997	Superstar International	(England) Jimmy White	5–3	
Runner-up	5.	1998	Charity Challenge (2)	(Scotland) John Higgins	8–9	
Disqualified	(Note: Having won 9–3, Ronnie O'Sullivan was subsequently stripped of his title and disqualified from the tournament, for failing a drugs test.)	1998	Irish Masters	(Republic of Ireland) Ken Doherty	9–3	
Winner	8.	1998	Scottish Masters	(Scotland) John Higgins	9–7	
Runner-up	6.	1999	Charity Challenge (3)	(Scotland) John Higgins	4–9	
Runner-up	7.	1999	Millennium Cup	(England) Stephen Lee	2–7	
Winner	9.	2000	Champions Cup (2)	(Wales) Mark Williams	7–5	
Winner	10.	2000	Scottish Masters (2)	(Scotland) Stephen Hendry	9–6	
Winner	11.	2001	Irish Masters	(Scotland) Stephen Hendry	9–8	
Winner	12.	2001	Premier League (2)	(Scotland) Stephen Hendry	9–7	
Runner-up	8.	2001	Scottish Masters	(Scotland) John Higgins	6–9	
Winner	13.	2002	Premier League (3)	(Scotland) John Higgins	9–4	
Winner	14.	2002	Scottish Masters (3)	(Scotland) John Higgins	9–4	
Runner-up	9.	2004	The Masters (3)	(England) Paul Hunter	9–10	
Winner	15.	2005	The Masters (2)	(Scotland) John Higgins	10–3	
Winner	16.	2005 (May)	Premier League (4)	(Wales) Mark Williams	6–0	
Winner	17.	2005 (Dec)	Premier League (5)	(Scotland) Stephen Hendry	6–0	
Runner-up	10.	2006	The Masters (4)	(Scotland) John Higgins	9–10	
Winner	18.	2006	Premier League (6)	(England) Jimmy White	7–0	
Winner	19.	2007	The Masters (3)	(China) Ding Junhui	10–3	
Winner	20.	2007	Kilkenny Irish Masters (2)	(England) Barry Hawkins	9–1	
Winner	21.	2007	Premier League (7)	(Scotland) John Higgins	7–4	
Winner	22.	2008	Hamm Invitational Trophy	(England) Barry Hawkins	6–2	
Winner	23.	2008	Premier League (8)	(England) Mark Selby	7–2	
Winner	24.	2009	The Masters (4)	(England) Mark Selby	10–8	
Runner-up	11.	2009	Premier League	(England) Shaun Murphy	3–7	
Runner-up	12.	2010	The Masters (5)	(England) Mark Selby	9–10	
Winner	25.	2010	Power Snooker	(China) Ding Junhui	(Note: This format was based on points. O'Sullivan won 572–258.)	
Winner	26.	2010	Premier League (9)	(England) Shaun Murphy	7–1	
Runner-up	13.	2011	Power Snooker	(England) Martin Gould	(Note: This format was based on points. O'Sullivan lost 258–286.)	
Winner	27.	2011	Premier League (10)	(China) Ding Junhui	7–1	
Winner	28.	2013	Champion of Champions	(England) Stuart Bingham	10–8	
Winner	29.	2014	The Masters (5)	(England) Mark Selby	10–4	
Winner	30.	2014	Champion of Champions (2)	(England) Judd Trump	10–7	
Runner-up	14.	2015	World Grand Prix	(England) Judd Trump	7–10	
Winner	31.	2016	The Masters (6)	(England) Barry Hawkins	10–1	
Runner-up	15.	2016	Championship League	(England) Judd Trump	2–3	
Runner-up	16.	2016	Champion of Champions	(Scotland) John Higgins	7–10	
Winner	32.	2017	The Masters (7)	(England) Joe Perry	10–7	
Runner-up	17.	2017	Hong Kong Masters	(Australia) Neil Robertson	3–6	
Runner-up	18.	2017	Champion of Champions (2)	(England) Shaun Murphy	8–10	
Winner	33.	2018	Shanghai Masters (3)	(England) Barry Hawkins	11–9	
Winner	34.	2018	Champion of Champions (3)	(England) Kyren Wilson	10–9	
Runner-up	19.	2019	The Masters (6)	(England) Judd Trump	4–10	
Winner	35.	2019	Shanghai Masters (4)	(England) Shaun Murphy	11–9	
Winner	36.	2022	Hong Kong Masters	(Hong Kong) Marco Fu	6–4	
Winner	37.	2022	Champion of Champions (4)	(England) Judd Trump	10–6	
Winner	38.	2023	Shanghai Masters (5)	(Belgium) Luca Brecel	11–9	
Winner	39.	2024	The Masters (8)	(England) Ali Carter	10–7	
Winner	40.	2024	World Masters of Snooker	(Belgium) Luca Brecel	5–2	
Winner	41.	2026	John Virgo Trophy	(Scotland) John Higgins	6–0	
Winner	42.	2026	Snooker 900 Global Championship	(Belgium) Luca Brecel	10–5	

=== Senior finals: 1 (1 title) ===
Outcome	No.	Year	Championship	Opponent	Score	Ref.
Winner	1.	2026	World Seniors Championship	(England) Joe Perry	10–4	

=== Pro–am finals: 1 (1 title) ===
Outcome	No.	Year	Championship	Opponent	Score	Ref.
Winner	1.	2015	Pink Ribbon	(England) Darryn Walker	4–2	

=== Team finals: 3 (3 titles) ===
Outcome	No.	Year	Championship	Team	Opponent	Score	Ref.
Winner	1.	2000	Nations Cup	England	Wales	6–4	
Winner	2.	2007	Euro-Asia Masters Team Challenge	Europe	Team Asia	5–3	
Winner	3.	2017	CVB Snooker Challenge	Great Britain	China	26–9	

=== Amateur finals: 7 (4 titles) ===
Outcome	No.	Year	Championship	Opponent	Score	Ref.
Runner-up	1.	1987	Pontins Junior Championship	(England) Rod Lawler	0–3	
Runner-up	2.	1988	UK Under-16 Championship	(England) Mark King	2–3	
Winner	1.	1989	British Under-16 Championship	(England) Andy Hicks	3–1	
Runner-up	3.	1991	English Amateur Championship	(England) Steve Judd	10–13	
Winner	2.	1991	IBSF World Under-21 Championship	(Belgium) Patrick Delsemme	11–4	
Winner	3.	1991	Junior Pot Black	(Republic of Ireland) Declan Murphy	2–0	
Winner	4.	1991	Pontins Autumn Championship	(Wales) Matthew Stevens	5–0	

== Maximum and century breaks ==
In March 2026 at the World Open, O’Sullivan achieved a break of 153, the highest ever in professional competition, potting 16 reds as a result of a free ball.

O'Sullivan has completed 17 maximum breaks in professional competition, from his first in the 1997 World Snooker Championship against Mick Price to his second of two 2025 Saudi Arabia Masters maximums against Chris Wakelin.

His first official maximum in 1997, completed in 5 minutes and 8 seconds, holds the record for the fastest maximum break achieved in competitive play. Initially, Guinness World Records recorded the time at 5 minutes and 20 seconds, but subsequent evidence has suggested that the BBC started the timer too early on the break. Depending on the timing methodology used, the break took between 5 minutes 8 seconds and 5 minutes 15 seconds; both World Snooker and Guinness World Records now officially acknowledge the shorter time.

O'Sullivan also holds the record for the total number of century breaks, compiling more than 1,300 in professional competition. At the 2022 Scottish Open, O'Sullivan scored a century in 3 minutes and 34 seconds—just 3 seconds slower than the fastest televised century break, made by Tony Drago in 1996. He scored his 1,300th century in the 2025 Saudi Arabia Snooker Masters final against Neil Robertson, making him the first ever professional snooker player to do so.

== See also ==
- Professional snooker career of Ronnie O'Sullivan
- Maximum and century breaks made by Ronnie O'Sullivan
