= 2014 Masters (snooker) =

Professional non-ranking snooker tournament, Jan 2014

2014 Dafabet Masters

Tournament information
- Dates: 12–19 January 2014
- Venue: Alexandra Palace
- City: London
- Country: England
- Organisation: World Snooker
- Format: Non-ranking event
- Total prize fund: £600,000
- Winner's share: £200,000
- Highest break: Marco Fu (HKG) (138)

Final
- Champion: Ronnie O'Sullivan (ENG)
- Runner-up: Mark Selby (ENG)
- Score: 10–4

The 2014 Masters (officially the 2014 Dafabet Masters) was a professional non-ranking snooker tournament that took place between 12 and 19 January 2014 at the Alexandra Palace in London, England. This was the first time that Dafabet sponsored the Masters.

Ronnie O'Sullivan set a new record by scoring 556 unanswered points in a professional event in his 6–0 quarter-final win against Ricky Walden – winning in just 58 minutes. The previous record-holder was Ding Junhui, who scored 495 unanswered points against Stephen Hendry at the 2007 Premier League Snooker. This record came close to being broken several times in different matches over the 12 years since the record had been set: it was ultimately eclipsed by Shaun Murphy during the 2026 China Open, who scored 607 points without reply.

O'Sullivan set another record by reaching his tenth Masters final, surpassing the nine appearances by Hendry, and won his fifth Masters title by defeating defending champion Mark Selby 10–4. This was the third time these two players had met in a Masters final.

== Field ==
Defending champion Mark Selby was the number 1 seed with World Champion Ronnie O'Sullivan seeded 2. The remaining places were allocated to players based on the latest world rankings (revision 5). With O'Sullivan having a ranking of 24, Graeme Dott, ranked 16, was not invited. Robert Milkins was making his debut in the Masters.

== Prize fund ==
The total prize money of the event was raised to £600,000 from the previous year's £500,000. The breakdown of prize money for this year is shown below:

- Winner: £200,000
- Runner-up: £90,000
- Semi-finals: £50,000
- Quarter-finals: £25,000
- Last 16: £12,500
- Highest break: £10,000
- Total: £600,000

== Tournament draw ==
Last 16; Best of 11 frames
1	Mark Selby (ENG)	6
15	Mark Davis (ENG)	5
8	Stuart Bingham (ENG)	2
13	John Higgins (SCO)	6
5	Judd Trump (ENG)	5
10	Marco Fu (HKG)	6
4	Ding Junhui (CHN)	4
9	Shaun Murphy (ENG)	6
3	Neil Robertson (AUS)	6
11	Mark Allen (NIR)	5
6	Stephen Maguire (SCO)	6
16	Joe Perry (ENG)	4
7	Barry Hawkins (ENG)	5
12	Ricky Walden (ENG)	6
2	Ronnie O'Sullivan (ENG)	6
14	Robert Milkins (ENG)	1

Quarter-finals; Best of 11 frames
1	(England) Mark Selby	6
13	(Scotland) John Higgins	5
10	(Hong Kong) Marco Fu	4
9	(England) Shaun Murphy	6
3	(Australia) Neil Robertson	2
6	(Scotland) Stephen Maguire	6
12	(England) Ricky Walden	0
2	(England) Ronnie O'Sullivan	6

Semi-finals; Best of 11 frames
1	(England) Mark Selby	6
9	(England) Shaun Murphy	1
6	(Scotland) Stephen Maguire	2
2	(England) Ronnie O'Sullivan	6

Final; Best of 19 frames
1	(England) Mark Selby	4
2	(England) Ronnie O'Sullivan	10

== Final ==
Final: Best of 19 frames. Referee: Paul Collier. Alexandra Palace, London, England, 19 January 2014
Mark Selby (1); England	4–10	Ronnie O'Sullivan (2); England
Afternoon: 0–97 (97), 14–70 (70), 0–102 (96), 43–72, 9–84, 64–53 (O'Sullivan 53), 56–63, 37–71; Evening: 0–91 (90), 63–61, 67–27 (67), 23–60, 76–0 (67), 25–80 (72)
67	Highest break	97
0	Century breaks	0
2	50+ breaks	6

== Century breaks ==
A total of 16 century breaks were made during the tournament.

- 138 – Marco Fu
- 136 – Mark Davis
- 134, 129 – Ronnie O'Sullivan
- 132, 112 – Barry Hawkins
- 120, 101 – Judd Trump
- 117 – Shaun Murphy
- 114 – Mark Allen
- 112 – Stephen Maguire
- 109 – John Higgins
- 106 – Joe Perry
- 104 – Mark Selby
- 101 – Neil Robertson
- 100 – Ricky Walden
