= 1999 Charity Challenge =

Charity Challenge
Tournament information
- Dates: 25–28 February 1999
- Venue: Assembly Rooms
- City: Derby
- Country: England
- Organisation: WPBSA
- Format: Non-Ranking event
- Total prize fund: £130,000
- Winner's share: £30,000
- Highest break: (Scotland) John Higgins (137)

Final
- Champion: (Scotland) John Higgins
- Runner-up: (England) Ronnie O'Sullivan
- Score: 9–4

The 1999 Charity Challenge was the fifth and final edition of the professional invitational snooker tournament, which took place from 25 to 28 February 1999.

The tournament was played at the Assembly Rooms in Derby, and featured twelve professional players.

John Higgins won the title for the second time in succession, beating Ronnie O'Sullivan 9–4 in the final.

== Qualifying ==
Four qualifying matches were played, under a best-of-nine frames format, the winners going on to play Ken Doherty, O'Sullivan, Stephen Hendry and Higgins, all of whom were seeded to the quarter-final stage.

=== Round 1 ===
- (England) Steve Davis 5–3 (England) Peter Ebdon
- (England) Jimmy White 5–4 (England) John Parrott
- (Hong Kong) Marco Fu 5–3 (Wales) Mark Williams
- (Scotland) Alan McManus 5–1 (Northern Ireland) Dennis Taylor

== Main draw ==
Quarter-finals; Best of 9 frames
(England) Ronnie O'Sullivan	5
(Scotland) Alan McManus	2
(England) Jimmy White	5
(Scotland) Stephen Hendry	2
(Scotland) John Higgins	5
(England) Steve Davis	0
(Hong Kong) Marco Fu	4
(Republic of Ireland) Ken Doherty	5

Semi-finals; Best of 11 frames
(England) Ronnie O'Sullivan	6
(England) Jimmy White	4
(Scotland) John Higgins	6
(Republic of Ireland) Ken Doherty	5

Final; Best of 17 frames
(England) Ronnie O'Sullivan	4
(Scotland) John Higgins	9

== Final ==
Final: Best of 17 frames. Referee: unknown. Assembly Rooms, Derby, England, 28 February 1999.
John Higgins; Scotland	9–4	Ronnie O'Sullivan; England
83(52)–0, 16–92(64), 62–0, 25–63(62), 82(65)–1, 67(62)–36, 94(63)–0, 67–52, 65–59, 79(78)–15, 20–71(62), 1–70(69), 67(67)–15
78	Highest break	69
0	Century breaks	0
6	50+ breaks	4

== Century breaks ==
- 137 – John Higgins
- 118, 109 – Jimmy White
- 113 – Peter Ebdon
- 108, 102 – Marco Fu
- 104 – Ronnie O'Sullivan
- 102 – Ken Doherty
