= 2019 Players Championship (snooker) =

2019 Coral Players Championship

Tournament information
- Dates: 4–10 March 2019
- Venue: Preston Guild Hall
- City: Preston, Lancashire
- Country: England
- Organisation: World Snooker
- Format: Ranking event
- Total prize fund: £380,000
- Winner's share: £125,000
- Highest break: Neil Robertson (AUS) (140)

Final
- Champion: Ronnie O'Sullivan (ENG)
- Runner-up: Neil Robertson (AUS)
- Score: 10–4

The 2019 Players Championship (officially the 2019 Coral Players Championship) was a professional snooker tournament that took place from 4–10 March 2019 in Preston, Lancashire, England. It was the sixteenth ranking event of the 2018/2019 season and a part of the newly created Coral Cup.

Ronnie O'Sullivan successfully defended his 2018 title by defeating Neil Robertson 10–4 in the final. This was O'Sullivan's 35th ranking title, one away from Stephen Hendry's record of 36 ranking titles. O'Sullivan made 3 centuries during the final, including one in the final match-winning frame; this was his 1,000th century break in competitive play, becoming the first player ever to reach that mark.

== Prize fund ==
The breakdown of prize money for this year is shown below:

- Winner: £125,000
- Runner-up: £50,000
- Semi-final: £30,000
- Quarter-final: £15,000
- Last 16: £10,000
- Highest break: £5,000
- Total: £380,000

The "rolling 147 prize" for a maximum break: £5,000

== Seeding list ==
The seedings were conducted on the basis of the one-year ranking list up to and including the 2019 Snooker Shoot Out.

| Rank | Player | Total points |
|---|---|---|
| 1 | Mark Allen (NIR) | 364,000 |
| 2 | Judd Trump (ENG) | 277,000 |
| 3 | Neil Robertson (AUS) | 255,500 |
| 4 | Mark Selby (ENG) | 236,500 |
| 5 | Ronnie O'Sullivan (ENG) | 228,500 |
| 6 | Mark Williams (WAL) | 208,500 |
| 7 | Kyren Wilson (ENG) | 177,500 |
| 8 | David Gilbert (ENG) | 170,000 |
| 9 | Stuart Bingham (ENG) | 167,000 |
| 10 | Jack Lisowski (ENG) | 138,000 |
| 11 | Ali Carter (ENG) | 113,000 |
| 12 | Barry Hawkins (ENG) | 112,000 |
| 13 | John Higgins (SCO) | 111,000 |
| 14 | Joe Perry (ENG) | 107,500 |
| 15 | Jimmy Robertson (ENG) | 107,225 |
| 16 | Stephen Maguire (SCO) | 105,500 |

== Main draw ==
The following shows the full results for the tournament. Players listed in bold denote match winners.

**Last 16**; Best of 11 frames
1 | **Mark Allen (NIR)** | **6**
16 | Stephen Maguire (SCO) | 2
8 | David Gilbert (ENG) | 4
9 | **Stuart Bingham (ENG)** | **6**
5 | **Ronnie O'Sullivan (ENG)** | **6**
12 | Barry Hawkins (ENG) | 4
4 | Mark Selby (ENG) | 4
13 | **John Higgins (SCO)** | **6**
3 | **Neil Robertson (AUS)** | **6**
14 | Joe Perry (ENG) | 3
6 | **Mark Williams (WAL)** | **6**
11 | Ali Carter (ENG) | 2
7 | Kyren Wilson (ENG) | 4
10 | **Jack Lisowski (ENG)** | **6**
2 | **Judd Trump (ENG)** | **6**
15 | Jimmy Robertson (ENG) | 0

**Quarter-finals**; Best of 11 frames
1 | (Northern Ireland) **Mark Allen** | **6**
9 | (England) Stuart Bingham | 4
5 | (England) **Ronnie O'Sullivan** | **6**
13 | (Scotland) John Higgins | 4
3 | (Australia) **Neil Robertson** | **6**
6 | (Wales) Mark Williams | 4
10 | (England) Jack Lisowski | 5
2 | (England) **Judd Trump** | **6**

**Semi-finals**; Best of 11 frames
1 | (Northern Ireland) Mark Allen | 0
5 | (England) **Ronnie O'Sullivan** | **6**
3 | (Australia) **Neil Robertson** | **6**
2 | (England) Judd Trump | 4

**Final**; Best of 19 frames
5 | (England) **Ronnie O'Sullivan** | **10**
3 | (Australia) Neil Robertson | 4

== Final ==
Final: Best of 19 frames. Referee: Terry Camilleri; Preston Guild Hall, Preston, England, 10 March 2019.
| Ronnie O'Sullivan (5); England | 10–4 | Neil Robertson (3); Australia |
Afternoon: 73–1, 118–0, 70–9, 90–25, 50–71, 116–7 (116), 71–14, 29–78, 105–6 (105); Evening: 0–120 (120), 90–5, 0–71, 80–24, 134–7 (134)
| 134 | Highest break | 120 |
| 3 | Century breaks | 1 |

== Century breaks ==
Total: 24

- 140, 120, 107, 101 – Neil Robertson
- 134, 116, 116, 106, 105, 101 – Ronnie O'Sullivan
- 131, 118 – Mark Williams
- 121, 110 – Jack Lisowski
- 121 – Mark Selby
- 115, 113, 106, 105, 104, 100 – Judd Trump
- 110, 104 – Barry Hawkins
- 108 – Mark Allen
