= 2005 Premier League Snooker (2005/06) =

Betfred Premier League
Tournament information
- Dates: 15 September – 4 December 2005
- Country: United Kingdom
- Organisation: Matchroom Sport
- Format: Non-ranking event
- Total prize fund: £250,000
- Winner's share: £50,000
- Highest break: Ronnie O'Sullivan (ENG) (136)

Final
- Champion: (England) Ronnie O'Sullivan
- Runner-up: (Scotland) Stephen Hendry
- Score: 6–0

The 2005 (Dec) Betfred Premier League was a professional non-ranking snooker tournament that was played from 15 September to 4 December 2005.

Ronnie O'Sullivan won in the final 6–0 against Stephen Hendry.

== Prize fund ==
The breakdown of prize money for this year is shown below:

- Winner: £50,000
- Runner-up: £25,000
- Semi-final: £12,500
- Frame-win: £1,000
- Century break: £1,000
- Total: £250,000

== League phase ==
Ranking		(England) OSU	(Scotland) HEN	(China) DIN	(England) DAV	(England) MUR	(England) WHI	(Scotland) MAG	Frame W-L	Match W-D-L	Pld-Pts
1	**Ronnie O'Sullivan**	x	3	3	5	5	5	6	26–10	4–2–0	6–10
2	**Stephen Hendry**	3	x	3	4	4	5	2	21–15	3–2–1	6–8
3	**Ding Junhui**	3	3	x	2	3	4	3	18–18	1–4–1	6–6
4	**Steve Davis**	1	2	4	x	3	2	4	16–20	2–1–3	6–5
5	Shaun Murphy	1	2	3	3	x	3	4	16–20	1–3–2	6–5
6	Jimmy White	1	1	2	4	3	x	3	14–22	1–2–3	6–4
7	Stephen Maguire	0	4	3	2	2	3	x	14–22	1–2–3	6–4

Top four qualified for the play-offs. If points were level then most frames won determined their positions. If two players had an identical record then the result in their match determined their positions. If that ended 3–3 then the player who got to three first was higher. (Breaks above 50 shown between (parentheses), century breaks shown in bold.)

- 15 September – Plymouth Pavilions, Plymouth, England
  - **Ding Junhui 4**–2 Jimmy White → 22–74 (58), 23–79, 58–48, (83)-24, 84–0, (61) 79–31
  - Ronnie O'Sullivan 3–3 Stephen Hendry → 50–57, (**104**) 108–11, 63–58, 0–79, (**125**)-8, 23–67
- 22 September – The Dome, Doncaster, England
  - Jimmy White 3–3 Shaun Murphy→ 0–124 (92), 64–54 (53), 33–81 (55), (50) 55–12, 29–70, (76)-7
  - Stephen Maguire 3–3 Ding Junhui → 76–38, (50) 99–0, 6–118 (80), 45–72 (63), 26–64, 76–40
- 29 September – The Anvil, Basingstoke, England
  - Stephen Hendry 3–3 Ding Junhui → 1–119 (**112**), (92) 100–0, 45–78 (74), 69–14, (**123**)-14, 13–76
  - **Jimmy White 4**–2 Steve Davis → 65–35, (54,52) 106–0, 71–7, 57–22, 58–66, 6-(71)
- 6 October – AECC, Aberdeen, Scotland
  - Shaun Murphy 3–3 Ding Junhui → (84)-0, 58–21, 0-(**126**), (58)-68, (62) 73–1, 0–134 (**114**)
  - **Stephen Hendry 4**–2 Steve Davis → (75) 125–0, 0–128 (**103**), (61) 76–1, (88)-0, 17-(69), (**110**) 114–1
- 20 October – Assembly Rooms, Derby, England
  - **Stephen Hendry 5**–1 Jimmy White → (94)–0, 63–45, (59) 70–2, 12–71 (50), (57) 94–0, 74–8
  - **Ronnie O'Sullivan 6**–0 Stephen Maguire → (83)-0, 86–42, (76)-30, (**131**)-7, (51) 86–12, (74)-5
- 27 October – Fairfield Halls, Croydon, England
  - Stephen Maguire 2–**4 Shaun Murphy** → (56) 66–13, 0–57, 40–78, 73–35, 36–69 (65), 22–72
  - **Ronnie O'Sullivan 5**–1 Steve Davis → (60) 86–13, (87)-19, 8–81 (55), 77–49, (**101**)-0, 65–24
- 3 November – Grimsby Auditorium, Grimsby, England
  - Steve Davis 3–3 Shaun Murphy → 68–51, 3–65, (**117**) 126–1, 28–65 (63), (95) 96–19, 0-(**125**)
  - **Ronnie O'Sullivan 5**–1 Jimmy White → (60) 105–0, 66–38, 0–71, (54) 72–5, (64) 81–1, (64) 71–0
- 10 November – Magnum Centre, Irvine, Scotland
  - **Stephen Hendry 4**–2 Shaun Murphy → 59–40, 1-(82), 73–26, (**104**)-0, 25-(75), (79)-0
  - Jimmy White 3–3 Stephen Maguire → 59–15, 65–25, (60) 64–32, 38–67 (62), 33–71, 18–80
- 17 November – Glades Arena, Kidderminster, England
  - Stephen Maguire 2–**4 Steve Davis** → 29–77, 48–9, 18–67, 50–87, 66–53, 37–72 (51)
  - Ronnie O'Sullivan 3–3 Ding Junhui → 4–63, (**100**) 131–0, 46–9, 0–(**116**), (53) 57–78 (50), 64–57
- 24 November – St David's Hall, Cardiff, Wales
  - **Steve Davis 4**–2 Ding Junhui → 67–6, 32–67 (51), 68–59, 69–25, 63–35, 9-(**101**)
  - Stephen Hendry 2–**4 Stephen Maguire** → 7–120 (**108**), 59–26, 2–68, 0–91 (50), 84–35, 7–77
  - **Ronnie O'Sullivan 5**–1 Shaun Murphy → 42–64, 88–45, (92)-0, (68) 83–43, (**129**) 137–0, 71–25

== Play-offs ==
3–4 December – G-Mex, Manchester, England

Semi-finals; Best of 9 frames
1	(England) Ronnie O'Sullivan*	5
4	(England) Steve Davis	3
2	(Scotland) Stephen Hendry**	5
3	(China) Ding Junhui	2

Final; Best of 11 frames
1	(England) Ronnie O'Sullivan***	6
2	(Scotland) Stephen Hendry	0

* (136)–0, (100) 105–1, (66)–72 (66), 0–103 (60), 50–75, (116) 122–0, (134)–0, (85)–0
** 43–88, 98–36, 62–21, (57) 67–26, (60) 97–0, 13–(89), (61) 76–0
*** (97)–6, 62–60, 73–29, 88–0, 65–41, 65–51

== Century breaks ==
- 136, 134, 131, 129, 125, 116, 104, 101, 100, 100 – Ronnie O'Sullivan
- 126, 116, 114, 112, 101 – Ding Junhui
- 125 – Shaun Murphy
- 123, 110, 104 – Stephen Hendry
- 117, 103 – Steve Davis
- 108 – Stephen Maguire
