= 2006 Premier League Snooker =

Betfred Premier League
Tournament information
- Dates: 14 September – 3 December 2006
- Country: United Kingdom
- Organisation: Matchroom Sport
- Format: Non-ranking event
- Total prize fund: £250,000
- Winner's share: £50,000
- Highest break: Ronnie O'Sullivan (ENG) (124)

Final
- Champion: (England) Ronnie O'Sullivan
- Runner-up: (England) Jimmy White
- Score: 7–0

The 2006 Betfred Premier League was a professional non-ranking snooker tournament that was played from 14 September to 3 December 2006.

Ronnie O'Sullivan won in the final 7–0 against Jimmy White.

== Prize fund ==
The breakdown of prize money for this year is shown below:

- Winner: £50,000
- Runner-up: £25,000
- Semi-final: £12,500
- Frame-win: £1,000
- Century break: £1,000
- Total: £250,000

== League phase ==
Ranking		(England) OSU	(China) DIN	(Scotland) DOT	(England) WHI	(England) DAV	(Scotland) HEN	(Republic of Ireland) DOH	Frame W-L	Match W-D-L	Pld-Pts
1	Ronnie O'Sullivan	x	3	3	5	4	4	5	24–12	4–2–0	6–10
2	Ding Junhui (Note: Ding Junhui withdrew from Premier League play-offs due to clash of dates with the 2006 Asian Games in Doha.)	3	x	4	1	6	3	4	21–15	3–2–1	6–8
3	Graeme Dott	3	2	x	4	4	3	2	18–18	2–2–2	6–6
4	Jimmy White	1	5	2	x	3	5	2	18–18	2–1–3	6–5
5	Steve Davis (Note: Steve Davis qualified for the play-offs due to the withdrawal of Ding.)	2	0	2	3	x	5	5	17–19	2–1–3	6–5
6	Stephen Hendry	2	3	3	1	1	x	4	14–22	1–2–3	6–4
7	Ken Doherty	1	2	4	4	1	2	x	14–22	2–0–4	6–4

Top four qualified for the play-offs. If points were level then most frames won determined their positions. If two players had an identical record then the result in their match determined their positions. If that ended 3–3 then the player who got to three first was higher. (Breaks above 50 shown between (parentheses), century breaks are indicated with bold.)

- 14 September – Sands Centre, Carlisle, England
  - Ronnie O'Sullivan 3–3 Ding Junhui → 8–79, (98)–4, (65)–(69), 0–(76), 86–16, (86)–0
  - Graeme Dott 3–3 Stephen Hendry → 58–(59), (75)–15, 76–69 (53), (57) 74–21, 21–64, 50–63
- 21 September – GL1, Gloucester, England
  - Jimmy White 2–4 Graeme Dott → (75) 80–0, 36–93, 34–(67), 64–55, 1–102 (96), 32–65 (61)
  - Ronnie O'Sullivan 5–1 Ken Doherty → 69–9, (66) 78–28, (71) 75–0, (124)–6, (61) 87–0, 9–65
- 28 September – The Hawth, Crawley, England
  - Steve Davis 0–6 Ding Junhui → 46–55, 29–78, 53–(57), 12–55, 39–54, 41–59
  - Jimmy White 2–4 Ken Doherty → 0–68, 53–1, 1–92 (55), 15–44, 0–70 (51), 72–22
- 5 October – Assembly Rooms, Derby, England
  - Jimmy White 5–1 Ding Junhui → 65–36, 0–63, (51) 71–23, 55–9, 53–51, (63) 67–1
  - Stephen Hendry 1–5 Steve Davis → 45–56, 26–91 (79), 0–(75), 9–67, 63–66, (71) 72–24
- 12 October – Guild Hall, Preston, England
  - Ken Doherty 2–4 Ding Junhui → (84) 88–0, 0–80, 0–(73), 61–41, 4–67 (54), 4–(112)
  - Ronnie O'Sullivan 5–1 Jimmy White → (54) 77–45, 35–69, (73) 114–0, (68) 80–16, 53–21, (51) 88–21
- 19 October – Grimsby Auditorium, Grimsby, England
  - Stephen Hendry 4–2 Ken Doherty → (60) 84–0, 70–7, 84–27, 1–80, (74) 81–0, 9–103
  - Steve Davis 3–3 Jimmy White → 41–78 (55), 71–24, 16–87, 52–62, 59–52, 67–40
- 2 November – Plymouth Pavilions, Plymouth, England
  - Ronnie O'Sullivan 4–2 Steve Davis → (88)–5, 72–48, 7–30, 82–5, 8–68, (108)–0
  - Graeme Dott 2–4 Ding Junhui → 0–126 (71,55), 7–64, 42–(79), (107) 131–0, 12–93 (81), 68–63 (56)
- 9 November – Warwick Arts Centre, Coventry, England
  - Ken Doherty 4–2 Graeme Dott → 81–15, (65) 78–13, 59–44, 0–90 (68), 0–95 (88), (83)–0
  - Stephen Hendry 1–5 Jimmy White → 51–48, 0–122 (105), 26–76 (75), 0–71, 45–49, 30–76
- 16 November – SECC, Glasgow, Scotland
  - Graeme Dott 4–2 Steve Davis → (61) 73–44, 1–81 (57), 0–(101), (70) 90–40, (70)82–27, 76–5
  - Ronnie O'Sullivan 4–2 Stephen Hendry → (65) 82–7, 51–35, 68–3, 0–(87), 4–78 (72), (84)–5
- 23 November – AECC, Aberdeen, Scotland
  - Steve Davis 5–1 Ken Doherty → (114) 139–7, 15–73 (69), (89) 90–4, 93–5, 93–24, (59) 78–6
  - Stephen Hendry 3–3 Ding Junhui → 57–43, (101)–7, 9–113 (108), (78)–12, 9–121(120), 12–(82)
  - Ronnie O'Sullivan 3–3 Graeme Dott → 47–91, 1–86 (79), 16–103 (67), 84–8, (88) 91–10, (64) 79–50

== Play-offs ==
2–3 December – Forum Centre, Wythenshawe, England

Semi-finals; Best of 9 frames
1	(England) Ronnie O'Sullivan*	5
5	(England) Steve Davis	2
3	(Scotland) Graeme Dott	4
4	(England) Jimmy White**	5

Final; Best of 13 frames
1	(England) Ronnie O'Sullivan***	7
4	(England) Jimmy White	0

* (111)–18, (54) 100–16, (64) 74–1, 48–66, (86) 106–17, 28–64, (64) 71–14
** 50–67, 0–71 (64), 0–(94), 20–62, (87)–1, (51) 63–28, 57–9, (61) 90–16, 11–60
*** 77–7, 62–49, (122)–0, (93)–0, 46–13, (73) 98–1, (113)–9

== Century breaks ==
- 124, 122, 113, 111, 108 – Ronnie O'Sullivan
- 120, 112, 108 – Ding Junhui
- 114, 101 – Steve Davis
- 107 – Graeme Dott
- 105 – Jimmy White
- 101 – Stephen Hendry
