= 2017 Hong Kong Masters =

Hong Kong Masters
Tournament information
- Dates: 20–23 July 2017
- Venue: Queen Elizabeth Stadium
- City: Hong Kong
- Organisation: WPBSA and HKBSCC
- Format: Non-ranking event
- Total prize fund: £315,000
- Winner's share: £100,000
- Highest break: (England) Ronnie O'Sullivan (143)

Final
- Champion: (Australia) Neil Robertson
- Runner-up: (England) Ronnie O'Sullivan
- Score: 6–3

The 2017 Hong Kong Masters was a non-ranking snooker tournament, held from 20 to 23 July 2017 at the Queen Elizabeth Stadium, Wan Chai, Hong Kong. The event is organized by the Hong Kong Billiard Sports Control Council known as HKBSCC, subvented by the Leisure and Cultural Services Department, managed by appointed event agency Yello Marketing (Yello) and sanctioned by World Snooker Limited. This tournament set the record for the largest live audience ever recorded at a snooker match with 3,000 people attending.

Neil Robertson won the event, beating Ronnie O'Sullivan 6–3 in the final.

== Prize fund ==
- Winner: £100,000
- Runner-up: £45,000
- Semi-final: £35,000
- Quarter-final: £22,500
- Total: £315,000
- Highest break: £10,000

== Main draw ==
Quarter-finals; Best of 9 frames
(England) Mark Selby	3
(Australia) Neil Robertson	5
(England) Barry Hawkins	3
(Hong Kong) Marco Fu	5
(England) Judd Trump	5
(England) Shaun Murphy	3
(Scotland) John Higgins	4
(England) Ronnie O'Sullivan	5

Semi-finals; Best of 11 frames
(Australia) Neil Robertson	6
(Hong Kong) Marco Fu	4
(England) Judd Trump	5
(England) Ronnie O'Sullivan	6

Final; Best of 11 frames
(Australia) Neil Robertson	6
(England) Ronnie O'Sullivan	3

== Final ==
Final: Best of 11 frames. Referee: John Fung; Queen Elizabeth Stadium, Wan Chai, Hong Kong, 23 July 2017.
Neil Robertson; Australia	6–3	Ronnie O'Sullivan; England
48–75, 81–0 (73), 133–0 (80, 53), 67–74 (67, 67), 0–143 (143), 64–40, 55–54, 80–4 (68), 82–8 (82)
80	Highest break	143
0	Century breaks	1
6	50+ breaks	2

== Century breaks ==
Total: 9

- 143, 128, 126 – Ronnie O'Sullivan
- 136, 100 – Judd Trump
- 132, 103 – Marco Fu
- 108, 100 – Neil Robertson
