= 2005 Premier League Snooker (2004/05) =

Betfred Premier League
Tournament information
- Dates: 6 January – 8 May 2005
- Country: United Kingdom
- Organisation: Matchroom Sport
- Format: Non-ranking event
- Total prize fund: £250,000
- Winner's share: £50,000
- Highest break: Ronnie O'Sullivan (ENG) (134)

Final
- Champion: (England) Ronnie O'Sullivan
- Runner-up: (Wales) Mark Williams
- Score: 6–0

The 2005 (May) Betfred Premier League was a professional non-ranking snooker tournament that was played from 6 January to 8 May 2005. This was the first Premier League event to use the shot clock.

Ronnie O'Sullivan won in the final 6–0 against Mark Williams.

== Prize fund ==
The breakdown of prize money for this year is shown below:

- Winner: £50,000
- Runner-up: £25,000
- Semi-final: £12,500
- Frame-win: £1,000
- Century break: £1,000
- Total: £250,000

== League phase ==
Ranking		(Hong Kong) FU	(Scotland) HEN	(England) OSU	(Wales) WIL	(England) WHI	(England) DAV	(England) HUN	Frame W-L	Match W-D-L	Pld	Pts
1	**Marco Fu**	x	2	3	5	4	5	3	22–14	3–2–1	6	8
2	**Stephen Hendry**	4	x	2	3	3	4	5	21–15	3–2–1	6	8
3	**Ronnie O'Sullivan**	3	4	x	4	2	3	4	20–16	3–2–1	6	8
4	**Mark Williams**	1	3	2	x	4	4	5	19–17	3–1–2	6	7
5	Jimmy White	2	3	4	2	x	3	3	17–19	1–3–2	6	5
6	Steve Davis	1	2	3	2	3	x	4	15–21	1–2–3	6	4
7	Paul Hunter	3	1	2	1	3	2	x	12–24	0–2–4	6	2

Top four qualified for the play-offs. If points were level then most frames won determined their positions. If two players had an identical record then the result in their match determined their positions. If that ended 3–3 then the player who got to three first was higher. (Breaks above 50 shown between (parentheses), century breaks shown in bold.)

- 6 January – Sands Centre, Carlisle, England
  - Jimmy White 3–3 Stephen Hendry → 34–75, (50) 52–28, 70–25, (58) 67–9, 0–77 (76), 22–94
  - Steve Davis 1–**5 Marco Fu** → 14–97, 27–75, 10–63, 14–66 (58), (76)–30, 47–71 (64)
- 13 January – Charter Hall, Colchester, England
  - **Mark Williams 5**–1 Paul Hunter → 74–17, 40–85, (**111**)–14, 70–32, (**104**)–0, (**106**) 122–0
  - Ronnie O'Sullivan 2–**4 Jimmy White** → 60–52, 0–71 (62), 1–(73), 6–(77), 35–78, (77)–41
- 27 January – Rothes Hall, Glenrothes, Scotland
  - **Stephen Hendry 4**–2 Marco Fu → 7–114 (**102**), 80–19, (72) 73–5, (93) 94–0, (**112**) 124–13, 55–71 (51)
  - **Mark Williams 4**–2 Steve Davis → (61) 76–0, 59–29, 15–64, 40–55, (58) 63–0, (62) 105–0
- 10 February – Glades Arena, Kidderminster, England
  - **Ronnie O'Sullivan 4**–2 Paul Hunter → 50–69, 70–38, (83) 101–3, (83)–0, 51–68, 63–49
  - Jimmy White 2–**4 Marco Fu** → 7–59, 10–112 (93), 26–64 (63), (68) 81–0, 11–60, 72–37
- 24 February – The Anvil, Basingstoke, England
  - Ronnie O'Sullivan 3–3 Steve Davis → 0–108 (76), (67) 80–32, 91–32, 8–68, 72–(63), 13–(**123**)
  - **Stephen Hendry 5**–1 Paul Hunter → 72–60 (52), (66) 70–(59), (60)–68 (62), 78–25, 71–70, (**130**)–0
- 3 March – Assembly Rooms, Derby, England
  - **Mark Williams 4**–2 Jimmy White → 7–(**118**), 66–33, 74–7, 24–73 (70), (73) 110–0, (97)–8
  - **Ronnie O'Sullivan 4**–2 Stephen Hendry → 0–(80), 86–4, (95)–1, 2–82, (67) 72–1, 73–32
- 17 March – King's Hall, Stoke-on-Trent, England
  - Jimmy White 3–3 Steve Davis → 0–121 (93), (**105**)–4, 18–61, (82) 90–4, 54–63, (92)–0
  - Ronnie O'Sullivan 3–3 Marco Fu → 0–90 (84), 78–25, 75–56, 4–100 (92), 77–64 (59), 4–128 (**110**)
- 24 March – Magnum Centre, Irvine, Scotland
  - Mark Williams 3–3 Stephen Hendry → 0–(88), (52) 62–34, (**108**) 139–5, 24–93, (73)–(64), 14–59
  - Paul Hunter 2–**4 Steve Davis** → (60) 67–74, 38–77 (51), 13–95 (50), 58–67, 66–45, (88)–6
- 7 April – Corn Exchange, Ipswich, England
  - Mark Williams 1–**5 Marco Fu** → 16–74 (62), 53–(65), 29–68 (64), (**103**)–25, 56–67, 0–(**133**)
  - **Ronnie O'Sullivan 4**–2 Mark Williams → (78)–4, 0–76, (63) 78–37, 60–25, 30–(**108**), (**132**)–0
- 14 April – The Dome, Doncaster, England
  - Paul Hunter 3–3 Jimmy White → 34–66, 6–70, 44–79, 67–52, (50) 72–1, 61–46
  - **Stephen Hendry 4**–2 Steve Davis → 10–99 (85), 37–70, (55) 68–24, (66) 86–35, (76)–1, 71–43
  - Paul Hunter 3–3 Marco Fu → 4–80 (63), (**106**) 110–5, 13–78, 64–33, 65–59, 15–62

== Play-offs ==
7–8 May – G-Mex, Manchester, England

Semi-finals; Best of 9 frames
1	(Hong Kong) Marco Fu	0
4	(Wales) Mark Williams*	5
2	(Scotland) Stephen Hendry	0
3	(England) Ronnie O'Sullivan**	5

Final; Best of 11 frames
4	(Wales) Mark Williams	0
3	(England) Ronnie O'Sullivan***	6

* 34–71 (55), 0–68, 0–134 (124), 15–61, 9–(73)
** 36–61, 38–85 (78), 6–74, 8–(121), 33–81
*** 52–70, 19–(75), 0–(134), 1–(71), 34–60, 0–(95)

== Century breaks ==
Each century break was worth a £1,000 per break.

- 134, 132, 121 – Ronnie O'Sullivan
- 133, 110, 102 – Marco Fu
- 130, 112 – Stephen Hendry
- 124, 111, 108, 108, 106, 104, 103 – Mark Williams
- 123 – Steve Davis
- 118, 105 – Jimmy White
- 106 – Paul Hunter
