= 2007 Euro-Asia Masters Challenge =

Euro-Asia Masters Challenge
Tournament information
- Dates: 12–15 July 2007
- Venue: Queen Elizabeth Stadium
- City: Wan Chai
- Country: Hong Kong
- Organisation: 110 Sport Management Group
- Format: Non-ranking event & Team event
- Winner's share: £25,000

Final
- Champion: (Scotland) John Higgins
- Runner-up: (Thailand) James Wattana
- Score: 5–4

The 2007 Euro-Asia Masters Challenge was a professional non-ranking team (also referred to as the Euro–Asia Team Challenge) and invitational snooker event that took place from 12 to 15 July 2007 at the Queen Elizabeth Stadium in Wan Chai, Hong Kong.

The tournament was a revival of the two Euro-Asia Masters Challenge events played under the same name in 2003. The tournament's team event consists of two teams of four, the European team and the Asian team, playing in a single-frame, best-of-nine competition, with Team Europe defeating Team Asia with a score of 5–3. The tournament's singles event featured eight players in two groups of four, with the top two in each group progressing to semi-finals. John Higgins defeated James Wattana 5–4 in the final to win the £25,000 prize.

== Teams and players ==
Team	Player 1	Player 2	Player 3	Player 4
Team Europe	John Higgins (SCO)	Ken Doherty (IRL)	Ronnie O'Sullivan (ENG)	Stephen Hendry (SCO)
Team Asia	Ding Junhui (CHN)	Marco Fu (HK)	James Wattana (THA)	Supoj Saenla (THA)

== Results ==
=== Euro–Asia Team Challenge ===
- Frame 1: (Scotland) John Higgins 7 – 71(70) (Hong Kong) Marco Fu — (Europe 0 – 1 Asia)
- Frame 2: (Republic of Ireland) Ken Doherty 86(61) – 42 (Thailand) James Wattana — (Europe 1 – 1 Asia)
- Frame 3: (Scotland) Stephen Hendry 66 – 19 (China) Ding Junhui — (Europe 2 – 1 Asia)
- Frame 4: (England) Ronnie O'Sullivan 99(68) – 9 (Thailand) Supoj Saenla — (Europe 3 – 1 Asia)
- Frame 5: (Scotland) John Higgins 39 – 56 (China) Ding Junhui — (Europe 3 – 2 Asia)
- Frame 6: (Scotland) Stephen Hendry 38 – 75 (Thailand) James Wattana — (Europe 3 – 3 Asia)
- Frame 7: (Republic of Ireland) Ken Doherty 65 – 31 (Thailand) Supoj Saenla — (Europe 4 – 3 Asia)
- Frame 8: (England) Ronnie O'Sullivan 80(50) – 8 (Hong Kong) Marco Fu — (Europe 5 – 3 Asia)

=== Euro-Asia Masters Challenge ===
==== Round-robin stage ====
Group A

POS	Player	MP	MW	ML	FW	FL	FD	PTS
1	(Scotland) John Higgins	3	3	0	6	0	+6	3
2	(Thailand) James Wattana	3	2	1	4	3	+1	2
3	(China) Ding Junhui	3	1	2	2	5	−3	1
4	(Scotland) Stephen Hendry	3	0	3	2	6	−4	0

Results:

- John Higgins 2–0 Stephen Hendry
- James Wattana 2–0 Ding Junhui
- James Wattana 2–1 Stephen Hendry
- John Higgins 2–0 Ding Junhui
- John Higgins 2–0 James Wattana
- Ding Junhui 2–1 Stephen Hendry

Group B

POS	Player	MP	MW	ML	FW	FL	FD	PTS
1	(Hong Kong) Marco Fu	3	3	0	6	1	+5	3
2	(Republic of Ireland) Ken Doherty	3	2	1	5	3	+1	2
3	(England) Ronnie O'Sullivan	3	1	2	3	4	−1	1
4	(Thailand) Supoj Saenla	3	0	3	0	6	−6	0

Results:

- Ken Doherty 2–1 Ronnie O'Sullivan
- Marco Fu 2–1 Ken Doherty
- Ronnie O'Sullivan 2–0 Supoj Saenla
- Marco Fu 2–0 Supoj Saenla
- Ken Doherty 2–0 Supoj Saenla
- Marco Fu 2–0 Ronnie O'Sullivan

==== Knock-out stage ====
Semi-finals; Best of 3 frames
(Scotland) John Higgins	2
(Republic of Ireland) Ken Doherty	0
(Hong Kong) Marco Fu	0
(Thailand) James Wattana	2

Final; Best of 9 frames
(Scotland) John Higgins	5
(Thailand) James Wattana	4

== Century breaks ==
- 127 – John Higgins
- 123 – Marco Fu
- 117 – Ronnie O'Sullivan
