= 2007 Irish Masters =

Kilkenny Irish Masters
Tournament information
- Dates: 9–11 March 2007
- Venue: Ormonde Hotel
- City: Kilkenny
- Country: Ireland
- Organisation: RIBSA
- Format: Non-ranking event
- Winner's share: €20,000
- Highest break: (England) Ronnie O'Sullivan (147)

Final
- Champion: (England) Ronnie O'Sullivan
- Runner-up: (England) Barry Hawkins
- Score: 9–1

The 2007 Kilkenny Irish Masters was a professional non-ranking snooker tournament that took place between 9 and 11 March 2007 at the Ormonde Hotel in Kilkenny, Ireland.

Ronnie O'Sullivan won in the final 9–1 against Barry Hawkins to claim the Paul Hunter Trophy. In the quarter-finals O'Sullivan also compiled a maximum break against Joe Swail. The initial maximum break prize of a Citroën Coupe, worth €20,000, was later withdrawn by the organisers.

== Prize fund ==
The breakdown of prize money for this year is shown below:

- Winner: €20,000
- Runner-up: €8,000
- Semi-final: €3,500
- Highest break: €2,000

== Round-robin stage ==
=== Group A ===
POS	Player	MP	MW	FW	FL	FD	PTS
1	(Scotland) John Higgins	2	1	6	4	+2	1
2	(Northern Ireland) Gerard Greene	2	1	7	6	+1	1
3	(Republic of Ireland) Michael Judge	2	1	4	7	−3	1

- Gerard Greene 3–4 Michael Judge
- Gerard Greene 4–2 John Higgins
- John Higgins 4–0 Michael Judge

=== Group B ===
POS	Player	MP	MW	FW	FL	FD	PTS
1	(Republic of Ireland) Fergal O'Brien	2	2	8	3	+5	2
2	(Australia) Neil Robertson	2	1	5	5	0	1
3	(England) Stephen Lee	2	0	3	8	−5	0

- Fergal O'Brien 4–2 Stephen Lee
- Neil Robertson 4–1 Stephen Lee
- Neil Robertson 1–4 Fergal O'Brien

=== Group C ===
POS	Player	MP	MW	FW	FL	FD	PTS
1	(England) Barry Hawkins	2	2	8	5	+3	2
2	(Republic of Ireland) David Morris	2	1	7	5	+2	1
3	(England) Jimmy White	2	0	3	8	−5	0

- Barry Hawkins 4–3 David Morris
- Jimmy White 2–4 Barry Hawkins
- David Morris 4–1 Jimmy White

=== Group D ===
POS	Player	MP	MW	FW	FL	FD	PTS
1	(Northern Ireland) Joe Swail	2	2	8	3	+5	1
2	(Republic of Ireland) Joe Delaney	2	1	5	6	−1	1
3	(Wales) Matthew Stevens	2	0	4	8	-4	0

- Matthew Stevens 2–4 Joe Delaney
- Joe Delaney 1–4 Joe Swail
- Joe Swail 4–2 Matthew Stevens

== Knockout stage ==
Quarter-finals; Best of 9 frames
(Scotland) Graeme Dott	4
(Scotland) John Higgins	5
(England) Ronnie O'Sullivan	5
(Northern Ireland) Joe Swail	4
(Scotland) Stephen Hendry	2
(England) Barry Hawkins	5
(Republic of Ireland) Ken Doherty	0
(Republic of Ireland) Fergal O'Brien	5

Semi-finals; Best of 11 frames
(Scotland) John Higgins	5
(England) Ronnie O'Sullivan	6
(England) Barry Hawkins	6
(Republic of Ireland) Fergal O'Brien	5

Final; Best of 17 frames
(England) Ronnie O'Sullivan	9
(England) Barry Hawkins	1

== Final ==
Final: Best of 17 frames Ormonde Hotel, Kilkenny, Ireland, 11 March 2007.
Ronnie O'Sullivan; England	9–1	Barry Hawkins; England
Afternoon: 42–62, 71–70 (Hawkins 70), 70–48 (52), 63–30, 85–24 (57), 86–40 (60), 122–0 (122), 66–7; Evening: 138–0 (138), 80–0 (80)
138	Highest break	70
2	Century breaks	0
6	50+ breaks	1

== Century breaks ==
- 147, 138, 134, 122 – Ronnie O'Sullivan
- 135 – John Higgins
- 131, 107, 104 – Barry Hawkins
- 109 – Fergal O'Brien
- 103 – David Morris
- 102 – Joe Swail
