= 2007 Premier League Snooker =

PartyBets.com Premier League
Tournament information
- Dates: 6 September – 2 December 2007
- Country: United Kingdom
- Organisation: Matchroom Sport
- Format: Non-ranking event
- Total prize fund: £250,000
- Winner's share: £50,000
- Highest break: Steve Davis (ENG) (143)

Final
- Champion: (England) Ronnie O'Sullivan
- Runner-up: (Scotland) John Higgins
- Score: 7–4

The 2007 PartyBets.com Premier League was a professional non-ranking snooker tournament that was played from 6 September to 2 December 2007.

Ronnie O'Sullivan won in the final 7–4 against John Higgins.

== Prize fund ==
The breakdown of prize money for this year is shown below:

- Winner: £50,000
- Runner-up: £25,000
- Semi-final: £12,500
- Frame-win: £1,000
- Century break: £1,000
- Total: £250,000

== League phase ==
| Ranking | | (China) DIN | (Scotland) HEN | (England) OSU | (Scotland) HIG | (England) DAV | (England) WHI | (Australia) ROB | Frame W-L | Match W-D-L | Pld-Pts |
|---|---|---|---|---|---|---|---|---|---|---|---|
| 1 | Ding Junhui | x | 6 | 4 | 2 | 6 | 3 | 4 | 25–11 | 4–1–1 | 6–9 |
| 2 | Stephen Hendry | 0 | x | 4 | 4 | 4 | 3 | 5 | 20–16 | 4–1–1 | 6–9 |
| 3 | Ronnie O'Sullivan | 2 | 2 | x | 5 | 4 | 6 | 5 | 24–12 | 4–0–2 | 6–8 |
| 4 | John Higgins | 4 | 2 | 1 | x | 3 | 4 | 3 | 17–19 | 2–2–2 | 6–6 |
| 5 | Steve Davis | 0 | 2 | 2 | 3 | x | 4 | 4 | 15–21 | 2–1–3 | 6–5 |
| 6 | Jimmy White | 3 | 3 | 0 | 2 | 2 | x | 3 | 13–23 | 0–3–3 | 6–3 |
| 7 | Neil Robertson | 2 | 1 | 1 | 3 | 2 | 3 | x | 12–24 | 0–2–4 | 6–2 |

Top four qualified for the play-offs. If points were level then most frames won determined their positions. If two players had an identical record then the result in their match determined their positions. If that ended 3–3 then the player who got to three first was higher. (Breaks above 50 shown between (parentheses); century breaks are indicated with bold.)

- 6 September – Olympos, Haywards Heath, England
  - Ronnie O'Sullivan 5–1 John Higgins → 63–27, 12–72, 80(68)–37, 124(124)–6, 83–38, 107(83)–7
  - Ding Junhui 3–3 Jimmy White → 0–87(86), 142(138)–0, 48–78(70), 128(66, 62)–0, 35–67(66), 103(103)–0
- 13 September – Malvern Theatres, Great Malvern, England
  - Steve Davis 4–2 Neil Robertson → 67–50, 74(73)–46, 70(69)–21, 66–15, 38–45, 14–93( 69)
  - Stephen Hendry 4–2 Ronnie O'Sullivan → 66–52(51), 1–98(98), 104(78)–0, 79–52(52), 95(54)–0, 6–105(101)
- 20 September – Dorking Halls, Dorking, England
  - John Higgins 3–3 Neil Robertson → 29–60, 87(87)–21, 36–59, 126(126)–1, 65–47, 5–64
  - Jimmy White 3–3 Stephen Hendry → 4–113(102), 48–59, 77–0, 72–48, 63–37, 61–64
- 27 September – Plymouth Pavilions, Plymouth, England
  - Ding Junhui 4–2 Ronnie O'Sullivan → 97(97)–0, 68–0, 137(137)–0, 57–67, 0–141(141), 72–21
  - Steve Davis 4–2 Jimmy White → 72–28, 31–56, 65(55)–33, 15–67, 49–14, 97(97)–0
- 4 October – Assembly Rooms, Derby, England
  - Stephen Hendry 5–1 Neil Robertson → 82(81)–0, 63–54, 77(77)–8, 130(130)–0, 67(67)–51, 50–77(59)
  - Ronnie O'Sullivan 4–2 Steve Davis → 105(105)–0, 141(141)–0, 96(96)–24, 75(55)–41, 0–147(143), 4–87
- 11 October – Grimsby Auditorium, Grimsby, England
  - Stephen Hendry 4–2 John Higgins → 117(63,50)-8, 24–59(53), 61–47, 128(128)–0, 0–128(128), 82–48
  - Ronnie O'Sullivan 6–0 Jimmy White → 124(119)–0, 87(51)–0, 69–65, 87(87)–38, 72–37, 92(91)–4
- 25 October – The Cresset, Peterborough, England
  - Ding Junhui 4–2 Neil Robertson → 8–65(53), 0–128(124), 103(103)–0, 115(115)–1, 73(73)–64(59), 133(133)–0
  - Stephen Hendry 4–2 Steve Davis → 0–92(53), 94(58)–0, 101(55)–21, 73(73)–0, 81–21, 29–76(52)
- 1 November – Guildford Spectrum, Guildford, England
  - Ding Junhui 6–0 Steve Davis → 80–31, 115(115)–0, 110(101)–24, 61(61)–9, 83(60)–0, 104(104)–0
  - John Higgins 4–2 Jimmy White → 71(65)–1, 106(105)–4, 64(64)–0, 59–68, 54–32, 8–93
- 15 November – Glades Arena, Kidderminster, England
  - John Higgins 4–2 Ding Junhui → 67–62, 77(57)–55, 77–14, 44–101, 0–103(94), 84(55)–21
  - Ronnie O'Sullivan 5–1 Neil Robertson → 77(57)–19, 114(113 **)–8, 58–56, 111(103)–10, 120(120)–6, 6–123(123)
- 22 November – Rothes Halls, Glenrothes, Scotland
  - Neil Robertson 3–3 Jimmy White → 36–69, 13–69, 65(51)–27, 42–60, 63(63)–24, 71(50)–17
  - Ding Junhui 6–0 Stephen Hendry → 133(133)–0, 88(87)–0, 136(136)–0, 138(138)–0, 75(54)–5, 66–36^{[a]}
  - John Higgins 3–3 Steve Davis → 79–16, 60(60)–15, 79–12, 1–69(68), 28–81, 33–74(70)

- ** On 15 November Ronnie O'Sullivan's 113 break in frame two of his 5–1 win over Neil Robertson was the 500th century break of his career.

== Play-offs ==
1–2 December – AECC, Aberdeen, Scotland

Semi-finals; Best of 9 frames
1 | (China) Ding Junhui | 3
4 | (Scotland) John Higgins | 5
2 | (Scotland) Stephen Hendry | 1
3 | (England) Ronnie O'Sullivan | 5

Final; Best of 13 frames
4 | (Scotland) John Higgins | 4
3 | (England) Ronnie O'Sullivan | 7

Semi-Final 1 – Ding Junhui 3–5 John Higgins 40–50, 31–73(60), 100(100)–0, 77–0, 0–116(116), 66–52, 3–119(84), 1–72(72)
Semi-Final 2 – Stephen Hendry 1–5 Ronnie O'Sullivan 17–75(75), 18–80(76), 83–16, 35–87(82), 1–93(92), 48–56
Final – John Higgins 4–7 Ronnie O'Sullivan 73(73)–0, 4–84(54), 49–82(66), 80–26, 77–0, 2–90(80), 29–104(104), 14–86(86), 14–111(110), 108(104)–0, 0–107(69)

== Century breaks ==
- 143 – Steve Davis
- 141, 141, 124, 120, 119, 113, 110, 105, 104, 103, 101 – Ronnie O'Sullivan
- 138, 138, 137, 136, 133, 133, 115, 115, 104, 103, 103, 101, 100 – Ding Junhui
- 130, 128, 102 – Stephen Hendry
- 128, 126, 116, 105, 104 – John Higgins
- 124, 123 – Neil Robertson

== Notes ==
- ^{a} Ding scored a record 495 points without reply in this match (this was a world record at the time) .
