= 2018 Players Championship (snooker) =

Snooker tournament in Wales

2018 Ladbrokes Players Championship
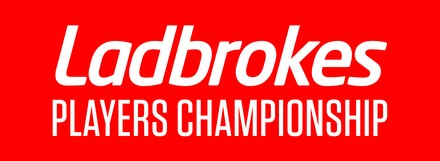

Tournament information
- Dates: 19–25 March 2018
- Venue: Venue Cymru
- City: Llandudno
- Country: Wales
- Organisation: World Snooker
- Format: Ranking event
- Total prize fund: £380,000
- Winner's share: £125,000
- Highest break: Ronnie O'Sullivan (ENG) (143)

Final
- Champion: Ronnie O'Sullivan (ENG)
- Runner-up: Shaun Murphy (ENG)
- Score: 10–4

The 2018 Players Championship (officially the 2018 Ladbrokes Players Championship) was a professional ranking snooker tournament that took place from 19 to 25 March 2018 at the Venue Cymru in Llandudno, Wales. It was the eighteenth ranking event of the 2017/2018 season.

Judd Trump was the defending champion, but he was beaten by Ronnie O'Sullivan 6–5 in the semi-finals.

Ronnie O'Sullivan captured his 33rd ranking title and fifth ranking title of the season by defeating Shaun Murphy 10–4 in the final, equalling the record of most ranking titles in a season shared by Stephen Hendry, Ding Junhui and Mark Selby.

== Prize fund ==
The breakdown of prize money for this year is shown below:

- Winner: £125,000
- Runner-up: £50,000
- Semi-final: £30,000
- Quarter-final: £15,000
- Last 16: £10,000
- Highest break: £5,000
- Total: £380,000

The "rolling 147 prize" for a maximum break stood at £30,000

== Seeding list ==
The seedings were conducted on the basis of the one-year ranking list up to and including the 2018 Gibraltar Open.

Rank	Player	Total points
1	Ronnie O'Sullivan (ENG)	535,500
2	Mark Williams (WAL)	267,500
3	John Higgins (SCO)	248,500
4	Judd Trump (ENG)	242,000
5	Luca Brecel (BEL)	240,100
6	Shaun Murphy (ENG)	222,000
7	Mark Selby (ENG)	220,725
8	Ding Junhui (CHN)	219,500
9	Mark Allen (NIR)	172,500
10	Ryan Day (WAL)	159,500
11	Kyren Wilson (ENG)	149,725
12	Neil Robertson (AUS)	142,000
13	Stephen Maguire (SCO)	136,500
14	Anthony McGill (SCO)	117,000
15	Yan Bingtao (CHN)	114,000
16	Graeme Dott (SCO)	113,500

== Main draw ==
Last 16; Best of 11 frames
1	Ronnie O'Sullivan (ENG)	6
16	Graeme Dott (SCO)	1
8	Ding Junhui (CHN)	6
9	Mark Allen (NIR)	2
5	Luca Brecel (BEL)	2
12	Neil Robertson (AUS)	6
4	Judd Trump (ENG)	6
13	Stephen Maguire (SCO)	4
3	John Higgins (SCO)	0
14	Anthony McGill (SCO)	6
6	Shaun Murphy (ENG)	6
11	Kyren Wilson (ENG)	3
7	Mark Selby (ENG)	3
10	Ryan Day (WAL)	6
2	Mark Williams (WAL)	6
15	Yan Bingtao (CHN)	2

Quarter-finals; Best of 11 frames
1	(England) Ronnie O'Sullivan	6
8	(China) Ding Junhui	3
12	(Australia) Neil Robertson	1
4	(England) Judd Trump	6
14	(Scotland) Anthony McGill	5
6	(England) Shaun Murphy	6
10	(Wales) Ryan Day	3
2	(Wales) Mark Williams	6

Semi-finals; Best of 11 frames
1	(England) Ronnie O'Sullivan	6
4	(England) Judd Trump	5
6	(England) Shaun Murphy	6
2	(Wales) Mark Williams	3

Final; Best of 19 frames
1	(England) Ronnie O'Sullivan	10
6	(England) Shaun Murphy	4

== Final ==
Final: Best of 19 frames. Referee: Jan Scheers. Venue Cymru, Llandudno, Wales, 25 March 2018.
Ronnie O'Sullivan (1); England	10–4	Shaun Murphy (6); England
Afternoon: 39–93, 67–55, 80–67, 76–9, 30–86, 65–50, 92–14, 70–0, 0–77; Evening: 92–43, 0–137 (137), 98–7, 121–9, 90–23
92	Highest break	137
0	Century breaks	1

== Century breaks ==
Total: 28

- 143, 134, 121, 106, 100 – Ronnie O'Sullivan
- 141, 127, 124 – Mark Williams
- 137, 133, 133, 117, 115, 105 – Shaun Murphy
- 133, 107 – Ryan Day
- 130 – Luca Brecel
- 129, 102 – Stephen Maguire
- 128, 123, 117, 109, 100 – Judd Trump
- 119 – Ding Junhui
- 107, 103 – Neil Robertson
- 107 – Anthony McGill
