= 2011 Premier League Snooker =

PartyPoker.com Premier League
Tournament information
- Dates: 18 August – 27 November 2011
- Country: United Kingdom
- Organisation: Matchroom Sport
- Format: Non-ranking event
- Total prize fund: £210,000
- Winner's share: £60,000
- Highest break: Neil Robertson (AUS) (140)

Final
- Champion: (England) Ronnie O'Sullivan
- Runner-up: (China) Ding Junhui
- Score: 7–1

The 2011 PartyPoker.com Premier League was a professional non-ranking snooker tournament. It was played under a variation of the standard rules of snooker. It was played from 18 August to 27 November 2011.

Ronnie O'Sullivan was the defending champion, and he won his 10th Premier League Snooker title by defeating Ding Junhui 7–1.

== Format ==
All evenings in the league stage featured three matches: two semi-finals and a final. All matches were best of 5 frames, with no dead frames played, points were awarded for every frame won. Meaning that the maximum number of points a player could obtain was 24 and the minimum was 0. All frames were subjected to a 20-second shot clock and there were two 20 second extensions available for each player in every frame. The miss rule was also changed; meaning that a player had three attempts to make legal contact with the ball on or otherwise ball in hand was given to the incoming player anywhere on the table. The final frame of any match was played under shoot-out rules. Each player appeared on 4 nights and were seeded to determine who they face. This was the first and only time in the events history there would be a clear winner in each match of the league phase. Unlike other years of the league phase when matches were best of 6 and therefore players could draw 3–3 on the night. In 2012 the Premier League reverted to the best of 6 round Robin matches. The play-offs were played to the rules used in previous editions. This meant that the top 4 after the league phase qualified for the semi-finals. As in other years 1st played 4th and 2nd played 3rd in the semi-finals.

== Prize fund ==
The breakdown of prize money for this year is shown below:

- Winner: £60,000
- Runner-up: £30,000
- Semi-final: £20,000
- 5th Place: £17,500
- 6th Place: £15,000
- 7th Place: £12,500
- 8th Place: £10,000
- 9th Place: £8,000
- 10th Place: £6,000
- Highest break (per night): £1,000
- Maximum break: £25,000
- Total: £210,000

== Players ==
Players were seeded according to their world rankings apart from the defending champion Ronnie O'Sullivan who was the number one seed.

Seed	Player	Qualified via
1	(England) Ronnie O'Sullivan	Defending champion
2	(Wales) Mark Williams	German Masters champion
3	(Scotland) John Higgins	UK, Welsh Open and World Champion
4	(China) Ding Junhui	Masters champion
5	(Australia) Neil Robertson	World Open champion
6	(England) Ali Carter	Shanghai Masters champion
7	(England) Shaun Murphy	PTC Finals champion
8	(England) Judd Trump	China Open champion
9	(Wales) Matthew Stevens	Championship League champion
10	(England) Jimmy White	World Seniors Champion

== League phase ==
Ranking	Name	Frames W–L	Match W–L	Pld–Pts
1	(England) Ronnie O'Sullivan	18–10	5–2	7–18
2	(China) Ding Junhui	16–14	5–2	7–16
3	(England) Judd Trump	14–9	4–2	6–14
4	(Wales) Mark Williams	13–10	3–3	6–13
5	(Australia) Neil Robertson	12–11	3–3	6–12
6	(Scotland) John Higgins	11–11	3–3	6–11
7	(England) Shaun Murphy	11–14	2–4	6–11
8	(England) Ali Carter	10–14	2–4	6–10
9	(Wales) Matthew Stevens	9–11	3–3	6–9
10	(England) Jimmy White	2–12	0–4	4–2

Top four qualified for the play-offs. The order of players was decided on most frames won, and then least frames lost. (Breaks above 50 shown between (parentheses); century breaks are indicated with bold.)

- 18 August – Embassy Theatre, Skegness, England
  - Semi-finals:
    - John Higgins 3–0 Jimmy White → 61–36, (105)–5, 71–69
    - Neil Robertson 0–3 Matthew Stevens → 18–63, 44–76, 13–(82)
  - Final: John Higgins 0–3 Matthew Stevens → 18–(91), 0–(95), 10–65
- 1 September – Guildford Spectrum, Guildford, England
  - Semi-finals:
    - Jimmy White 0–3 Mark Williams → 1–(105), 30–61, 5–82 (60)
    - Ronnie O'Sullivan 2–3 Shaun Murphy → 63–48, 45–71, 68–49, 6–(115), 0–91 (85)
  - Final: Mark Williams 3–1 Shaun Murphy → 67–(65), 14–66, 62–47, (101) 118–6
- 22 September – Ravenscraig Sports Facility, Motherwell, Scotland
  - Semi-finals:
    - John Higgins 0–3 Neil Robertson → 14–126 (57, 69), 0–93 (87), 35–95
    - Ding Junhui 3–2 Shaun Murphy → (92) 124–7, 36–(98), 8–117 (98), (87) 102–21, (80)–0
  - Final: Neil Robertson 3–1 Ding Junhui → 56–63, (140)–0, (109) 118–0, 54–42
- 29 September – The Dome, Doncaster, England
  - Semi-finals:
    - Ronnie O'Sullivan 3–0 Matthew Stevens → 70–0, (94)–0, 77–12
    - Ding Junhui 0–3 Ali Carter → 9–82, 14–120 (50,70), 0–92 (91)
  - Final: Ronnie O'Sullivan 3–1 Ali Carter → 41–54, 52–42, (68) 72–21, 36–6 (Note: Carter lost the fourth frame on the three-miss rule.)
- 6 October – Hutton Moor Leisure Centre, Weston-super-Mare, England
  - Semi-finals:
    - Mark Williams 1–3 Judd Trump → 0–79 (64), 76–14, 0–79 (50), 23–71
    - John Higgins 2–3 Matthew Stevens → 5–(104), 68–87, (57) 61–1, 68–67 (67), 0–51
  - Final: Judd Trump 3–0 Matthew Stevens → 72–43, (81)–0, 67–30
- 13 October – Biddulph Leisure Centre, Stoke-on-Trent, England
  - Semi-finals:
    - Mark Williams 2–3 Ali Carter → 27–69, 66–41, 45–63, (115) 131–1, 0–84
    - Jimmy White 2–3 Ding Junhui → (52) 87–39, (59)–66, (52) 72–(56), 24–115 (78), 20–59
  - Final: Ali Carter 1–3 Ding Junhui → (96)–0, 7–67, 51–72, 1–72 (66)
- 20 October – Riverside Leisure Centre, Exeter, England
  - Semi-finals:
    - Ali Carter 1–3 Judd Trump → (78)–0, 14–62, 16–(111), 31–57 (53)
    - Shaun Murphy 1–3 Neil Robertson → 37–66 (60), (53) 74–41, 35–83 (52), 49–68
  - Final: Judd Trump 3–1 Neil Robertson → 55–54, 38–76, 74–0 (59), 79–0 (76)
- 3 November – Southampton Guildhall, Southampton, England
  - Semi-finals:
    - Ronnie O'Sullivan 3–2 Judd Trump → 0–(139), (53) 94–32, (89)–22, 46–64 (58), (70) 78–4
    - Neil Robertson 2–3 Ding Junhui → 59–72, 14–(61), (66) 72–17, (55) 70–46, 7–100 (58)
  - Final: Ronnie O'Sullivan 1–3 Ding Junhui → (77) 82–0, 1–74, 58–68, 17–79 (76)
- 10 November – Spiceball Leisure Centre, Banbury, England
  - Semi-finals:
    - John Higgins 3–1 Ali Carter → 36–52, (101) 117–13, (79) 95–0, 67–38
    - Mark Williams 3–0 Matthew Stevens → 63–28, 76–5, (105)–0
  - Final: John Higgins 3–1 Mark Williams → (125) 130–1, 44–77, (89)–24, 69–22
- 17 November – Grimsby Auditorium, Grimsby, England
  - Semi-finals:
    - Judd Trump 0–3 Shaun Murphy 1–75, 0–(122), 14–111 (100)
    - Ronnie O'Sullivan 3–0 Jimmy White → (65) 87–29, 75–6, (103) 120–6
  - Final: Shaun Murphy 1–3 Ronnie O'Sullivan → 16–(82), 35–(78), (52) 83–0, 40–(100)

== Play-offs ==
26–27 November, Potters Leisure Resort, Hopton-on-Sea, England

Semi-finals; Best of 9 frames
1	(England) Ronnie O'Sullivan*	5
4	(Wales) Mark Williams	2
2	(China) Ding Junhui**	5
3	(England) Judd Trump	3

Final; Best of 13 frames
1	(England) Ronnie O'Sullivan***	7
2	(China) Ding Junhui	1

* 0–66, 70–33, 109(109)–3, 34–59, 96(55)–0, 85(84)–0, 92(88)–9
** 89–37, 28–53, 15–74 (58), 68(59)–17, 139(139)–0, 69–58,14–70,75(75)–25
*** 68(52)–31, 96(92)–16, 80(56)–24, 57–43, 33–70, 79–52, 63(63)–61(60), 77(77)–0

== Qualifiers ==
The qualification for this tournament, the Championship League was played in eight groups from 3 January to 24 March 2011.

== Century breaks ==
- 140, 109 – Neil Robertson
- 139, 111 – Judd Trump
- 139 – Ding Junhui
- 125, 105, 101 – John Higgins
- 122, 115, 100 – Shaun Murphy
- 115, 105, 105, 101 – Mark Williams
- 109, 103, 100 – Ronnie O'Sullivan
- 104 – Matthew Stevens
