= 2013 Champion of Champions =

2013 888casino Champion of Champions

Tournament information
- Dates: 19–24 November 2013
- Venue: Ricoh Arena
- City: Coventry
- Country: England
- Organisation: Matchroom Sport
- Format: Non-ranking event
- Total prize fund: £270,000
- Winner's share: £100,000
- Highest break: Ronnie O'Sullivan (ENG) (130)

Final
- Champion: Ronnie O'Sullivan (ENG)
- Runner-up: Stuart Bingham (ENG)
- Score: 10–8

The 2013 Champion of Champions (officially the 2013 888casino Champion of Champions) was a professional non-ranking snooker tournament held between 19 and 24 November 2013 at the Ricoh Arena in Coventry, England. This was the first time that 888casino sponsored the event, which was broadcast live on ITV4.

The event was last held in 1980, when Doug Mountjoy won in the final 10–8 against John Virgo.

Ronnie O'Sullivan won his 52nd professional title by defeating Stuart Bingham 10–8 in the final.

== Prize fund ==
The breakdown of prize money for this year is shown below:

- Winner: £100,000
- Runner-up: £50,000
- Semi-finals: £20,000
- Group runner-up: £10,000
- Group semi-finals: £5,000
- Total: £270,000

== Players ==
Players qualified for the event by winning important tournaments from the start of the 2012-13 season to the 2013 Indian Open. The important events included all rankings events and winners the following non-rankings events: 2012 Premier League Snooker, 2013 Masters and 2013 Championship League. With only 14 different players winning one of the qualifying events, the remaining two places were allocated to the highest ranked players who had not already qualified.

The following 16 players qualified for the tournament:

Seed	Player	Qualified as	Ref.
1	(England) Ronnie O'Sullivan	Winner of 2013 World Snooker Championship	
2	(England) Mark Selby	Winner of 2012 UK Championship and 2013 Masters	
3	(England) Judd Trump	Winner of 2012 International Championship	
4	(Australia) Neil Robertson	Winner of 2013 China Open and 2013 Wuxi Classic	
5	(Northern Ireland) Mark Allen	Winner of 2013 World Open	
6	(England) Ricky Walden	Winner of 2012 Wuxi Classic	
7	(Scotland) John Higgins	Winner of 2012 Shanghai Masters	
8	(China) Ding Junhui	Winner of 2013 Players Championship Grand Final, 2013 Shanghai Masters and 2013 Indian Open	
9	(England) Barry Hawkins	Winner of 2012 Australian Goldfields Open	
10	(Scotland) Stephen Maguire	Winner of 2013 Welsh Open	
11	(England) Stuart Bingham	Winner of 2012 Premier League Snooker	
12	(England) Ali Carter	Winner of 2013 German Masters	
13	(England) Martin Gould	Winner of 2013 Championship League	
14	(Hong Kong) Marco Fu	Winner of 2013 Australian Goldfields Open	
15	(England) Shaun Murphy	World ranking of 4. Highest ranked player after the 2013 Shanghai Masters	
16	(England) Mark Davis	World ranking of 13. Highest ranked player after the 2013 Indian Open	

== Main draw ==
Group semi-finals (last 16); Best of 7 frames
1	(England) Ronnie O'Sullivan	4
16	(England) Mark Davis	0
Group 1
8	(China) Ding Junhui	4
9	(England) Barry Hawkins	2
5	(Northern Ireland) Mark Allen	3
12	(England) Ali Carter	4
Group 4
4	(Australia) Neil Robertson	4
13	(England) Martin Gould	3
3	(England) Judd Trump	4
14	(Hong Kong) Marco Fu	1
Group 3
6	(England) Ricky Walden	0
11	(England) Stuart Bingham	4
7	(Scotland) John Higgins	3
10	(Scotland) Stephen Maguire	4
Group 2
2	(England) Mark Selby	4
15	(England) Shaun Murphy	2

Group finals (quarter-finals); Best of 11 frames
1	(England) Ronnie O'Sullivan	6
8	(China) Ding Junhui	5
12	(England) Ali Carter	5
4	(Australia) Neil Robertson	6
3	(England) Judd Trump	2
11	(England) Stuart Bingham	6
10	(Scotland) Stephen Maguire	3
2	(England) Mark Selby	6

Semi-finals; Best of 11 frames
1	(England) Ronnie O'Sullivan	6
4	(Australia) Neil Robertson	5
11	(England) Stuart Bingham	6
2	(England) Mark Selby	4

Final; Best of 19 frames
1	(England) Ronnie O'Sullivan	10
11	(England) Stuart Bingham	8

== Final ==
Final: Best of 19 frames. Referee: Paul Collier. Ricoh Arena, Coventry, England, 24 November 2013.
Ronnie O'Sullivan (1); England	10–8	Stuart Bingham (11); England
Afternoon: 26–109 (109), 82–48 (66), 66–47 (55), 53–57, 1–72 (72), 1–66 (52), 76–4 (76), 0–133 (109), 130–0 (130); Evening: 99–1 (93), 64–54 (Bingham 54), 37–64, 35–65, 91–8 (62), 96–34 (96), 38–74 (66), 65–29, 83–0
130	Highest break	109
1	Century breaks	2
7	50+ breaks	6

== Century breaks ==
- 130, 130, 119, 103, 101 – Ronnie O'Sullivan
- 129, 125, 119, 113, 112, 105 – Neil Robertson
- 127, 112 – Ali Carter
- 125 – Stephen Maguire
- 117, 113, 103 – Mark Selby
- 111, 109, 109 – Stuart Bingham
- 104 – Ding Junhui
- 102 – Martin Gould
