= Ali Carter =

English professional snooker player

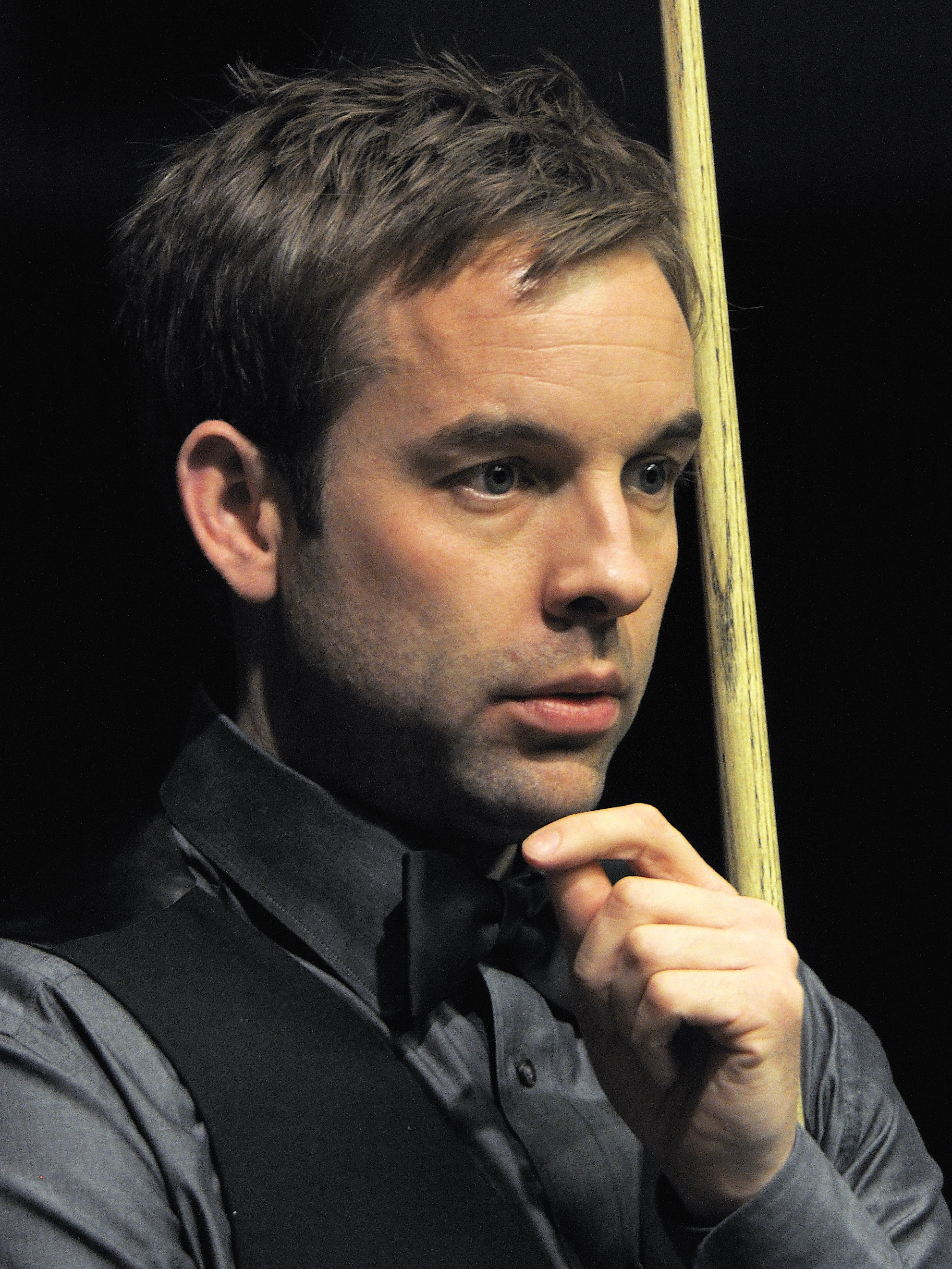
- Carter in 2013

Personal information
- Nickname: The Captain
- Born: 25 July 1979 (age 47) Colchester, Essex, England

Sport
- Country: England
- Sport: Snooker
- Professional: 1996/1997, 1998–present
- Highest ranking: 2 (September–October 2010)
- Current ranking: 15 (as of 7 November 2026)
- Maximum breaks: 4
- Century breaks: 476 (as of 19 November 2026)

Tournament wins
- Ranking: 7
- Minor-ranking: 1
Medal record
Mixed snooker
Representing Great Britain
World Games
Silver medal – second place	2017 Wrocław	Individual

Allister Carter (born 25 July 1979) is an English professional snooker player. He has twice been a World Championship finalist, in 2008 and 2012, losing both finals to Ronnie O'Sullivan. He has won seven ranking titles and briefly reached number two in the world rankings in 2010. His nickname, "The Captain", comes from his hobby of piloting aeroplanes.

== Career ==
Carter turned professional in 1996. He first emerged in 1999, winning the WPBSA Young Player of the Year award after winning the Benson and Hedges Championship in 1999 – this earned him a wild card place in the Masters. He also reached the semi-finals of the 1999 Grand Prix. It was eight years before he reached another ranking semi-final, the 2007 Malta Cup.

He was close to the elite top 16 for three successive seasons, ranking as 17, 19, and 19 through 2003–04, 2004–05 and 2005–06, respectively, before reaching it in the 2006–07 season and remaining there in 2008.

He reached the last 16 (second round) of the World Championship in 2005, after scoring the first 10–0 victory in the event since 1993 against 1993 semi-finalist James Wattana in qualifying. At the 2007 World Championship he beat Andy Hicks in the first round, 10–4, before beating World Number 1 and seven-time champion Stephen Hendry 13–6 to reach his first World Championship quarter-final and guarantee a place in the top 16.

Carter has at times missed out on opportunities from winning positions, an extreme example being in the first round of the 2007 UK Championship, when he led Barry Hawkins 8–3, before Hawkins won the next six frames to win 9–8. However, Carter got his own back on Hawkins during the 2008 World Championship by beating him 10–9 in a 'controversial' finale. Hawkins had levelled the match to 9–9, when the players were pulled out of the arena to allow the evening matches to begin. They returned after one of the evening's two matches had been completed – on a table they had not previously played on. Hawkins felt this break interrupted his momentum, handing the match to Carter. He followed this by defeating two former champions in succession; provisional World Number 1 Shaun Murphy 13–4 in the second round and then 2002 winner Peter Ebdon 13–9 in the quarter-final. In the semi-final on 4 May 2008 he beat Joe Perry 17–15 to book a place against Ronnie O'Sullivan in the final. However, Carter went on to lose the final 8–18.

Carter scored his first 147 break on 29 April 2008 at the World Championship, one day after Ronnie O'Sullivan had made one in the same tournament. This made Carter the sixth man to achieve this feat at the Crucible (the eighth made there, as O'Sullivan had previously achieved it three times), and the first to have done so without previously winning a tournament. It was the first time two 147s have been made in the same event.

Carter soon showed signs of carrying this form forward in subsequent events. He won his second non-ranking tournament, the Huangshan Cup in China, with a 5–3 win over the reigning Grand Prix champion Marco Fu. In the 2008–09 season, Carter reached the semi-final stage of events on three occasions. He progressed to the semi-finals of the season's first ranking event, the 2008 Northern Ireland Trophy before losing 5–6 to O'Sullivan having led 5–4. He reached the same stage of the Grand Prix, defeating veterans Steve Davis and John Parrott before losing to Ryan Day, again 5–6 The third occasion was the UK Championship where wins over Peter Ebdon and Mark Williams were followed by a close 7–9 defeat to the man he was victorious against in the Huangshan Cup final in China, Marco Fu. After thirteen years as a professional, Carter defeated the likes of Jimmy White, Graeme Dott, Shaun Murphy, Anthony Hamilton, and Joe Swail to finally win his first ranking tournament – the 2009 Welsh Open.

He made a slow start to the 2009–10 season, losing 0–5 to Liang Wenbo in the last 16 of the Shanghai Masters and losing in the first round at the Grand Prix, before reaching the quarter-finals of the UK Championship. As the defending champion at the Welsh Open he progressed to the final, where he was beaten by John Higgins, the reigning world champion at the time. He finished the season strongly by reaching the semi-finals at the China Open and the World Championship, losing in the latter to eventual champion, Neil Robertson, by 12–17. Of the six ranking tournaments that were staged during the 2009–10 season, Carter's campaigns were ended by the eventual champion on four occasions, and on another by the runner-up. He finished the season by moving up to a career high position of 4th in the world rankings.

Carter won the 2010 Shanghai Masters. He had to recover from 1–4 down in the quarter-final to defeat Matthew Stevens 5–4, Stevens missing the final black off its spot in the deciding frame. He then won six frames in a row from 0–2 down to beat Mark Selby 6–2, and edged past qualifier Jamie Burnett 10–7 in the final. The following events were not very successful for Carter, as he was eliminated in the last 32 of the World Open by Mark Williams 1–3, he suffered an early exit against the young talent Mark Joyce in the first round of the UK Championship by 6–9 and also lost his first round match of the 2011 Masters against Peter Ebdon by 5–6.

=== 2011–12 season ===
Carter's 2011–12 season got off to a poor start as he exited the first two ranking events of the year, the Australian Goldfields Open and the Shanghai Masters, in the first round. At the UK Championships he defeated Robert Milkins, but then lost 2–6 to Mark Allen in the last 16. After the match Carter stated on Twitter: "I'm going to retire at the end of the season! And I can't wait!" and that he was "dead serious" about the threat. Later on he admitted the comments were made "in the heat of the moment" but that he did have some "serious thinking to do at the end of the season". He lost in the first round in the Masters and the next two ranking events, and then withdrew from the World Open in China for medical reasons. Although he reached the quarter-finals of the China Open with wins over Dominic Dale and Lu Ning before losing 2–5 to Ding Junhui, Carter found himself out of the world's top 16 for the first time since 2005.

Before the start of the World Championship Carter stated that his future in the game depended on his health, as his ten-year battle with Crohn's disease continued. Three weeks before the start of the event he began cutting out dairy and wheat from his diet. This looked to have an effect on the snooker table too as he raced into an 8–1 lead over Mark Davis in the opening session of the first round, before returning to close out the match 10–2. He played world number 2 Judd Trump in the second round and from 9–12 behind, produced a superb fightback to record the result of his season to take the match 13–12 and reach the quarter-finals. He defeated impressive debutant Jamie Jones 13–11 in the last eight to book a semi-final with Stephen Maguire. He won this match by a 17–12 scoreline to play in a repeat of the 2008 final against Ronnie O'Sullivan. He lost 11–18, meaning he has now not beaten O'Sullivan in any of their 12 ranking event matches. Despite reaching the final, Carter finished the season ranked world number 17, meaning he had dropped 11 places during the year.

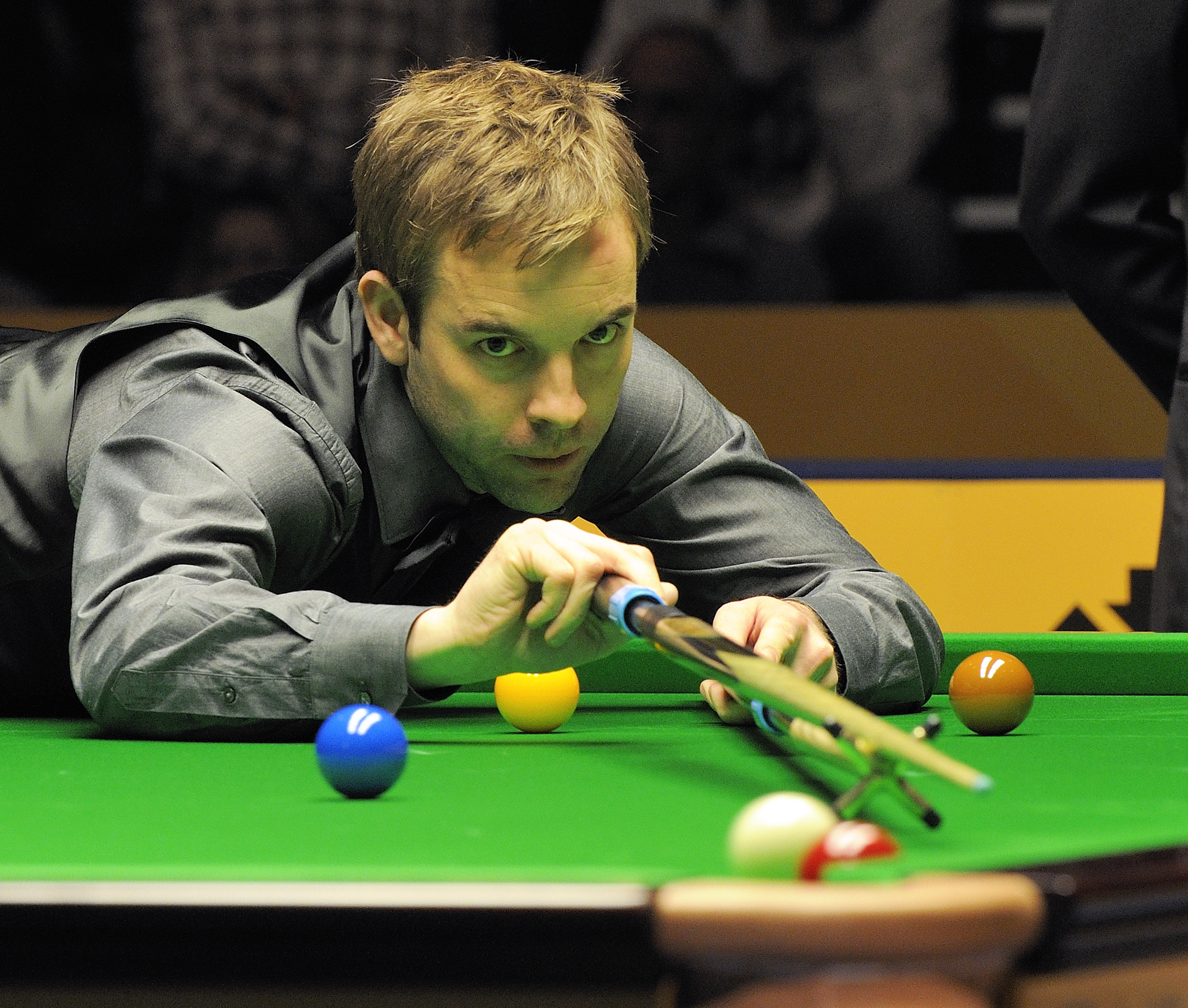
Carter at the 2013 German Masters

=== 2012–13 season ===
Carter began the season in less than auspicious form as he lost in the first round of both the Wuxi Classic and Australian Goldfields Open. He won his first match in a ranking event of the season by beating Robert Milkins 5–4 in the Shanghai Masters and then whitewashed Stephen Maguire 5–0 to advance to the quarter-finals. He played John Higgins and at 1–4 down threatened a comeback by winning two frames, but lost the next to exit the tournament, losing 3–5. A first round defeat in the International Championship followed before he saw off Steve Davis and Mark Joyce in the UK Championship both by 6–2 scorelines and Stuart Bingham 6–4 to make the semi-finals for the first time since 2008. Carter was the victim of a stunning fightback against Shaun Murphy in the semi-finals as he led 8–4 but Murphy levelled at 8–8 and when Carter broke down on a break of 32 in the deciding frame, Murphy stepped in to win 9–8. Carter was beaten 3–6 by Higgins in the first round of the Masters.

After scoring comfortable victories over Fraser Patrick, Anthony Hamilton and Michael Holt at the German Masters, Carter then took advantage of a poor performance from Neil Robertson to reach the final, where he played Marco Fu. Carter came back from 3–5 down to win 9–6 to secure the third ranking event title of his career. Fu gained revenge in the PTC Finals by beating Carter 4–1 in the second round, before Carter reached the final of the non-televised Championship League but lost 2–3 to Martin Gould. He was edged out 4–5 in the second round of the China Open by Mark Williams. At the World Championship, he won seven frames in a row to see off Ben Woollaston 10–4 in the first round, and came back from 1–5 in the last 16 against Ronnie O'Sullivan to level at 7–7, before O'Sullivan stepped up a gear to knock out Carter 13–8. He ended the season ranked world number 16.

=== 2013–14 season ===
Carter won through to the third round of the Wuxi Classic, before being edged out 5–4 by David Morris in the last 16. After his first round loss to Mark Davis in the Shanghai Masters, he was forced to withdraw from the next two ranking events due to health problems documented below. He returned for the UK Championship and dropped just one frame in his opening two matches, before losing 3–6 to Graeme Dott. Carter dropped out of the top 16 in the world rankings during the year to miss out on playing in the Masters for the first time since 2006, but reached his first semi-final in a ranking event in over a year at the China Open, losing 2–6 to Neil Robertson. He was beaten 13–9 by Mark Selby in the second round of the World Championship and bemoaned his opponent's negative playing style, saying that he was the only one trying to make things happen during the game.

=== 2014–15 season ===
Carter missed the start of the 2014–15 season due to receiving treatment for a recurrence of testicular cancer metastasising to his lung. He returned in October at the non-ranking General Cup and won the title by defeating Shaun Murphy 7–6 in the final. In October, World Snooker and the WPBSA announced that Carter's seeding for the remainder of the season would be based on a world ranking of 13. His first match back in a ranking event was a 5–6 loss to Zhang Anda in the opening round of the UK Championship. Carter received a standing ovation at the Masters and beat Barry Hawkins 6–1, before Neil Robertson defeated him by a reversal of this scoreline in the quarter-finals. Afterwards Carter said he was nowhere near match sharp and was targeting the World Championship as the place to rediscover his best form. He won his first matches at the venue stage of a ranking event this year at the Welsh Open with victories over Fraser Patrick, Mark King and Matthew Selt, before losing 2–4 to Ben Woollaston in the last 16 and was knocked out in the first round of the China Open 5–4 by Kurt Maflin.

Carter had a comprehensive 10–5 win over Alan McManus in the first round of the World Championship which began with a 127 break, before once again losing to Robertson in the next round, this time 5–13. His ranking was now no longer frozen and with him dropping down to world number 29 he set a goal to reclaim his top 16 ranking next season.

=== 2015–16 season ===
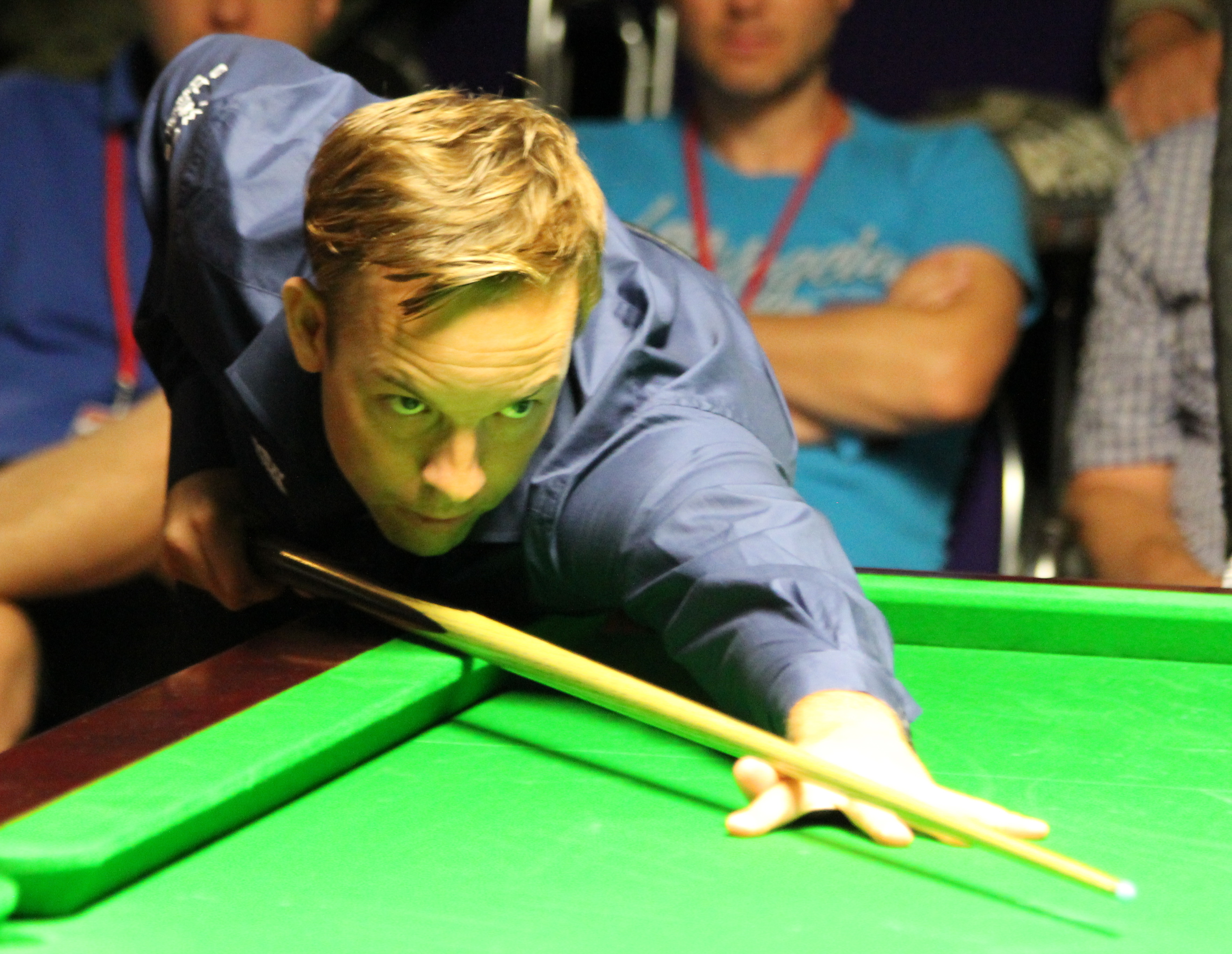
2015 Paul Hunter Classic

Carter won the Paul Hunter Classic by defeating Shaun Murphy 4–3 in the final with a 95 break in the deciding frame, after a spirited fightback from Murphy to level it from 1–3 down. It was Carter's maiden European Tour title and his first ranking title since beating cancer. The win was especially fitting as the player it was named after, Paul Hunter, died of cancer in 2006. Carter lost 2–6 in the third round of the UK Championship to John Higgins. At the World Grand Prix he beat Luca Brecel 4–1 and Tom Ford 4–0 to reach his first ranking event quarter-final of the season, but lost 1–4 to Joe Perry. Another followed at the PTC Finals courtesy of knocking out Graeme Dott and Judd Trump both 4–1. In the quarters Ricky Walden eliminated him 4–1. Carter came through a trio of matches to qualify for the World Championship and held his nerve after leading defending champion Stuart Bingham 5–1 and 8–5 to beat him 10–9. He took a 9–7 advantage over Alan McManus after the second session of their second round match, but went on to lose 11–13.

=== 2016–17 season ===
Carter whitewashed John Higgins 5–0 in the quarter-finals of the World Open and swept past Thepchaiya Un-Nooh 6–1 to play Joe Perry in the final. He completed a 10–8 win to take his fourth ranking title and first since 2013, as well as regaining his place in the elite top 16. At the Shanghai Masters he lost 1–5 in the quarter-finals to Stuart Bingham. He reached the final of the German Masters by seeing off Martin Gould 6–2 and led Anthony Hamilton 5–2. However, he then lost seven of the next eight frames to be defeated 6–9. Carter beat Shaun Murphy 5–4 and Neil Robertson 5–3 at the Players Championship and then was defeated 4–6 by Judd Trump in the semi-finals. He lost 7–10 to Graeme Dott in the first round of the World Championship.

=== 2017–18 season ===
Carter was a consistent performer in the 2017–18 season. He began by reaching the semi-finals of the China Championship, losing 4–6 to Shaun Murphy. He also reached the quarter-finals of the International Championship after beating Jamie Barrett, Andrew Higginson, Stephen Maguire, and Shaun Murphy. In the quarter-final, Carter forced a decider after trailing 3–5 to Martin Gould, but eventually lost 5–6. At the World Snooker Championship, he advanced to the quarter-finals after beating Graeme Dott and Ronnie O'Sullivan. He eventually lost 8–13 to Mark Williams.

=== 2018–19 season ===
In October, Carter reached the quarter-finals of the English Open after wins over Rory McLeod, Luca Brecel, Matthew Selt, and Daniel Wells, before losing 2–5 to Stuart Bingham. He then reached the quarter-finals of another ranking event, this time at the International Championship, but was whitewashed by Mark Allen 6–0. The best result of the season for Carter came in the World Grand Prix in February. He defeated Martin O'Donnell, Mark Allen, David Gilbert, and Xiao Guodong to reach the final, but eventually lost 6–10 to Judd Trump.

=== 2019–20 season ===
Carter took part in the 2020 Dafabet Masters, despite being ranked 17th, as a result of Ronnie O'Sullivan not wishing to compete. He reached the final for the first time in his career, his opponent was Stuart Bingham. Carter trailed 3–5 at the end of the first session, but then won the first four frames in the second session to take a lead of 7–5. Bingham responded well though and took the next four frames to be one frame away from victory, then eventually won 10–8. Immediately after the Masters, Carter also reached the semi-finals of the European Masters, but lost 1–6 to Neil Robertson.

=== 2020–present ===
At both the 2025 and 2026 World Championships, Carter exited in the first round following defeats to O'Sullivan and Higgins respectively. He won the 2026 English Open, after defeating Mark Williams 9–6 in the final.

== Personal life ==
Carter was diagnosed with Crohn's disease in 2003. Due to this, he has partly controlled his condition by limiting dairy and wheat/gluten in his diet.

It was announced on 1 July 2013 that Carter had been diagnosed with testicular cancer. He had surgery a day later and was advised to rest for a month. On 19 July 2013, he reported on his Twitter page that he had received the all-clear and would resume his career at the Shanghai Masters in September. He stated in April 2014 that he would have chosen to take a break from snooker for six to twelve months, but this had not been possible as he needed to regain his place in the top 16 of the world rankings. A month later, World Snooker announced that Carter had been diagnosed with lung cancer and would be taking a break from the sport to receive a course of intensive chemotherapy. In August 2014, he successfully completed treatment for this secondary tumour (metastatic recurrence of the testicular cancer), including surgery, and returned to the World Snooker Tour in October at the General Cup, which he won.

Carter practised at Chelmsford's Rivermead Snooker Club before buying the club and becoming the new owner. He also has a keen interest in flying and has a pilot's licence.

His first child, with his ex-partner Sarah, was a son, born in 2009. He has a daughter with his ex-partner, Stella English, who was the winner of Series Six of The Apprentice in 2010.

== Performance and rankings timeline ==
Tournament	1996/ 97	1997/ 98	1998/ 99	1999/ 00	2000/ 01	2001/ 02	2002/ 03	2003/ 04	2004/ 05	2005/ 06	2006/ 07	2007/ 08	2008/ 09	2009/ 10	2010/ 11	2011/ 12	2012/ 13	2013/ 14	2014/ 15	2015/ 16	2016/ 17	2017/ 18	2018/ 19	2019/ 20		2020/ 21	2021/ 22	2022/ 23	2023/ 24	2024/ 25	2025/ 26	2026/ 27
Ranking (Note: It shows the ranking at the beginning of the season)	(Note: New players on the Main Tour don't have a ranking)	(Note: He was an amateur)		142	92	61	31	17	19	19	15	14	7	5	4	6	17	16	13	29	32	12	11	17		19	24	20	11	10	17	22
Ranking tournaments
Championship League	Tournament Not held											Non-Ranking Event														RR	3R	2R	RR	W	RR	2R
China Open (Note: The event was called the China International (1997/1998–1998/1999))	NH	NR	LQ	LQ	LQ	1R	Not Held		1R	LQ	2R	2R	2R	SF	QF	QF	2R	SF	1R	1R	2R	1R	2R	Tournament Not Held								LQ
Wuhan Open	Tournament Not Held																												F	3R	1R	2R
British Open	LQ	A	LQ	LQ	LQ	QF	QF	1R	3R	Tournament Not Held																	4R	LQ	3R	LQ	3R	1R
English Open	Tournament Not Held																				3R	2R	QF	1R		1R	1R	QF	3R	2R	2R	W
Shenzhen Open (Note: The event was called the Xi'an Grand Prix (2024/2025–2025/2026))	Tournament Not Held																													LQ	1R	1R
Northern Ireland Open	Tournament Not Held																				WD	2R	4R	3R		SF	1R	LQ	A	1R	WD	1R
International Championship	Tournament Not Held																1R	WD	A	1R	3R	QF	QF	3R		Not Held			QF	2R	WD	LQ
UK Championship	LQ	A	LQ	LQ	LQ	2R	2R	3R	QF	QF	2R	1R	SF	QF	1R	2R	SF	3R	1R	3R	3R	1R	3R	3R		1R	2R	LQ	1R	2R	LQ	
Shoot Out	Tournament Not Held														Non-Ranking Event						A	3R	2R	2R		WD	3R	4R	SF	3R	WD	
Scottish Open (Note: The event was called the International Open (1996/1997) and the Players Championship (2003/2004))	LQ	A	LQ	2R	3R	3R	QF	2R	Tournament Not Held								MR	Not Held			2R	2R	4R	2R		2R	LQ	2R	2R	3R	1R	
German Masters (Note: The event was called the German Open (1996/1997–1997/1998))	LQ	A	NR	Tournament Not Held											2R	1R	W	1R	LQ	1R	F	LQ	LQ	LQ		LQ	LQ	W	QF	2R	SF	
Welsh Open	LQ	A	1R	LQ	LQ	1R	1R	1R	3R	1R	QF	QF	W	F	SF	1R	LQ	4R	4R	2R	3R	2R	1R	2R		QF	QF	2R	LQ	SF	1R	
World Grand Prix	Tournament Not Held																		NR	QF	2R	1R	F	1R		1R	2R	1R	2R	1R	QF	
Players Championship (Note: The event was called the Players Tour Championship Grand Final (2010/2011–2015/2016))	Tournament Not Held														DNQ	DNQ	2R	DNQ	DNQ	QF	SF	DNQ	1R	DNQ		DNQ	DNQ	F	SF	DNQ	DNQ	
World Open (Note: The event was called the Grand Prix (1996/1997–2000/2001 and 2004/2005–2009/2010) and the LG Cup (2001/2002–2003/2004))	LQ	A	LQ	SF	LQ	1R	1R	QF	2R	1R	RR	2R	SF	1R	1R	WD	WD	2R	Not Held		W	A	2R	3R		Not Held			2R	SF	1R	
Tour Championship	Tournament Not Held																						DNQ	DNQ		DNQ	DNQ	QF	QF	DNQ	DNQ	
World Championship	LQ	LQ	LQ	LQ	LQ	LQ	1R	1R	2R	1R	QF	F	2R	SF	2R	F	2R	2R	2R	2R	1R	QF	QF	LQ		1R	LQ	1R	1R	1R	1R	
Non-ranking tournaments
Shanghai Masters	Tournament Not Held											Ranking Event											A	1R		Not Held			2R	2R	F	A
Champion of Champions	Tournament Not Held																	QF	1R	1R	1R	A	A	A		A	A	A	QF	1R	A	1R
The Masters	LQ	LQ	LQ	1R	LQ	LQ	LQ	LQ	A	LQ	1R	1R	QF	1R	1R	1R	1R	A	QF	A	1R	1R	A	F		A	A	A	F	1R	A	
Riyadh Season Championship (Note: The event was called the World Masters of Snooker (2023/2024))	Tournament Not Held																												QF	A	A	
Championship League	Tournament Not Held											RR	RR	RR	SF	RR	F	RR	2R	2R	RR	SF	RR	RR	RR	2R	RR	RR	WD	WD	WD	
Former ranking tournaments
Asian Classic	LQ	Tournament Not Held																														
Malta Grand Prix	Non-Ranking Event			LQ	NR	Tournament Not Held																										
Thailand Masters (Note: The event was called the Thailand Open (1996/1997))	LQ	A	LQ	LQ	LQ	LQ	NR	Not Held			NR	Tournament Not Held																				
Irish Masters	Non-Ranking Event						2R	LQ	LQ	NH	NR	Tournament Not Held																				
Northern Ireland Trophy	Tournament Not Held									NR	2R	3R	SF	Tournament Not Held																		
Bahrain Championship	Tournament Not Held												1R	Tournament Not Held																		
Wuxi Classic (Note: The event was called the Jiangsu Classic (2008/2009–2009/2010))	Tournament Not Held												Non-Ranking Event				1R	3R	WD	Tournament Not Held												
Australian Goldfields Open	Tournament Not Held															1R	1R	A	A	2R	Tournament Not Held											
Shanghai Masters	Tournament Not Held											1R	1R	2R	W	1R	QF	1R	A	LQ	QF	2R	Non-Ranking			Not Held			Non-Ranking Event			
Paul Hunter Classic (Note: The event was called the Grand Prix Fürth (2004/2005) and the Fürth German Open (2005/2006–2006/2007))	Tournament Not Held								Pro-am Event						Minor-Ranking Event						3R	A	A	NR		Tournament Not Held						
Indian Open	Tournament Not Held																	WD	WD	NH	LQ	LQ	A	Tournament Not Held								
Riga Masters (Note: The event was called the Riga Open (2014/2015–2015/2016))	Tournament Not Held																		Minor-Rank		3R	A	2R	1R		Tournament Not Held						
China Championship	Tournament Not Held																				NR	SF	1R	LQ		Tournament Not Held						
WST Pro Series	Tournament Not Held																									F	Tournament Not Held					
Turkish Masters	Tournament Not Held																										QF	Tournament Not Held				
Gibraltar Open	Tournament Not Held																			MR	A	WD	WD	WD		3R	3R	Tournament Not Held				
WST Classic	Tournament Not Held																											SF	Tournament Not Held			
European Masters (Note: The event was called the European Open (1996/1997 and 2001/2002–2003/2004), the Irish Open (1998/1999) and the Malta Cup (2004/2005–2007/2008))	LQ	NH	LQ	Not Held		LQ	LQ	LQ	LQ	1R	SF	NR	Tournament Not Held								1R	LQ	2R	SF		2R	2R	SF	1R	Not Held		
Saudi Arabia Masters	Tournament Not Held																													5R	QF	NH
Former non-ranking tournaments
Scottish Masters	A	A	A	A	A	A	LQ	Tournament Not Held																								
Northern Ireland Trophy	Tournament Not Held									WR	Ranking Event			Tournament Not Held																		
Malta Cup	R	NH	R	Not Held		Ranking Event						RR	Tournament Not Held								Ranking Event											
Huangshan Cup	Tournament Not Held											W	Tournament Not Held																			
Masters Qualifying Event (Note: The event was called the Benson & Hedges Championship (1993/1994-2002/2003))	LQ	LQ	1R	W	1R	1R	2R	LQ	NH	F	A	A	A	A	Tournament Not Held																	
Beijing International Challenge	Tournament Not Held													RR	RR	Tournament Not Held																
Hainan Classic	Tournament Not Held														SF	Tournament Not Held																
Wuxi Classic	Tournament Not Held												RR	RR	A	F	Ranking Event			Tournament Not Held												
Brazil Masters	Tournament Not Held															QF	Tournament Not Held															
Power Snooker	Tournament Not Held														SF	1R	Tournament Not Held															
Premier League (Note: The event was called the European League (1996/1997))	A	A	A	A	A	A	A	A	A	A	A	A	A	A	A	RR	A	Tournament Not Held														
General Cup (Note: The event was called the General Cup International (2004/2005–2011/2012))	Tournament Not Held								A	Tournament Not Held				A	NH	A	A	A	W	WD	Tournament Not Held											
Shoot Out	Tournament Not Held														2R	1R	1R	3R	2R	3R	Ranking Event											
China Championship	Tournament Not Held																				QF	Ranking Event				Tournament Not Held						
Romanian Masters	Tournament Not Held																					SF	Tournament Not Held									
Six-red World Championship (Note: The event was called the Six-red Snooker International (2008/2009) and the Six-red World Grand Prix (2009/2010))	Tournament Not Held												A	A	A	NH	A	A	A	A	A	A	A	QF		Not Held		WD	Tournament Not Held			

Performance Table Legend
LQ	Lost in the qualifying draw	#R	Lost in the early rounds of the tournament (WR = Wildcard round, RR = Round robin)	QF	Lost in the quarter-finals
SF	Lost in the semi-finals	F	Lost in the final	W	Won the tournament
DNQ	Did not qualify for the tournament	A	Did not participate in the tournament	WD	Withdrew from the tournament

NH / Not held	means an event was not held.
NR / Non-ranking event	means an event is/was no longer a ranking event.
R / Ranking event	means an event is/was a ranking event.
MR / Minor-ranking event	means an event is/was a minor-ranking event.
PA / Pro-am event	means an event is/was a pro-am event.

== Career finals ==
=== Ranking finals: 15 (7 titles) ===
Legend
World Championship (0–2)
Other (7–6)

Outcome	No.	Year	Championship	Opponent in the final	Score
Runner-up	1.	2008	World Snooker Championship	(England) Ronnie O'Sullivan	8–18
Winner	1.	2009	Welsh Open	(Northern Ireland) Joe Swail	9–5
Runner-up	2.	2010	Welsh Open	(Scotland) John Higgins	4–9
Winner	2.	2010	Shanghai Masters	(Scotland) Jamie Burnett	10–7
Runner-up	3.	2012	World Snooker Championship (2)	(England) Ronnie O'Sullivan	11–18
Winner	3.	2013	German Masters	(Hong Kong) Marco Fu	9–6
Winner	4.	2016	World Open	(England) Joe Perry	10–8
Runner-up	4.	2017	German Masters	(England) Anthony Hamilton	6–9
Runner-up	5.	2019	World Grand Prix	(England) Judd Trump	6–10
Runner-up	6.	2021	WST Pro Series	(Wales) Mark Williams	Round-Robin
Winner	5.	2023	German Masters (2)	(England) Tom Ford	10–3
Runner-up	7.	2023	Players Championship	(England) Shaun Murphy	4–10
Runner-up	8.	2023	Wuhan Open	(England) Judd Trump	7–10
Winner	6.	2024	Championship League	(Wales) Jackson Page	3–1
Winner	7.	2026	English Open	(Wales) Mark Williams	9–6

=== Minor-ranking finals: 1 (1 title) ===
Outcome	No.	Year	Championship	Opponent in the final	Score
Winner	1.	2015	Paul Hunter Classic	(England) Shaun Murphy	4–3

=== Non-ranking finals: 12 (4 titles) ===
Legend
The Masters (0–2)
Other (4–6)

Outcome	No.	Year	Championship	Opponent in the final	Score
Winner	1.	1999	Benson and Hedges Championship	(England) Simon Bedford	9–4
Runner-up	1.	2005	Masters Qualifying Event	(England) Stuart Bingham	3–6
Winner	2.	2008	Huangshan Cup	(Hong Kong) Marco Fu	5–3
Runner-up	2.	2011	Wuxi Classic	(England) Mark Selby	7–9
Runner-up	3.	2013	Championship League	(England) Martin Gould	2–3
Winner	3.	2014	General Cup	(England) Shaun Murphy	7–6
Runner-up	4.	2017	World Games	(England) Kyren Wilson	1–3
Runner-up	5.	2020	The Masters	(England) Stuart Bingham	8–10
Runner-up	6.	2023	Macau Masters – Event 1	(England) Mark Selby	3–6
Runner-up	7.	2024	The Masters (2)	(England) Ronnie O'Sullivan	7–10
Winner	4.	2024	Helsinki International Cup	(England) Kyren Wilson	6–3
Runner-up	8.	2025	Shanghai Masters	(England) Kyren Wilson	9–11

== See also ==
- List of people diagnosed with Crohn's disease
