= 2012 Premier League Snooker =

PartyPoker.com Premier League
Tournament information
- Dates: 16 August – 25 November 2012
- Country: England
- Organisation: Matchroom Sport
- Format: Non-ranking event
- Total prize fund: £210,000
- Winner's share: 50,000
- Highest break: Stuart Bingham (ENG) (135)

Final
- Champion: (England) Stuart Bingham
- Runner-up: (England) Judd Trump
- Score: 7–2

The 2012 PartyPoker.com Premier League was a professional non-ranking snooker tournament that was played from 16 August to 25 November 2012. This was the last edition of the tournament, as in 2013 it was replaced by the Champion of Champions.

Ronnie O'Sullivan was the defending champion, but he decided not to compete this year.

Stuart Bingham won his eighth professional title by defeating Judd Trump 7–2 in the final.

== Prize fund ==
The breakdown of prize money for this year is shown below:

- Winner: £50,000
- Runner-up: £25,000
- Semi-final: £12,500
- Frame-win: £1,000 (only in league phase)
- Century break: £1,000 (only in league phase)
- Highest break: £5,000
- Maximum break: £25,000
- Total: £210,000

== Players ==
Rankings	Player	Qualified via
1	(England) Mark Selby	Shanghai Masters champion
2	(England) Judd Trump	UK champion
5	(Scotland) John Higgins	Wildcard
6	(England) Shaun Murphy	Brazil Masters champion
7	(Australia) Neil Robertson	Masters champion
8	(England) Stephen Lee	PTC Finals champion
11	(China) Ding Junhui	Championship League champion
12	(Northern Ireland) Mark Allen	World Open champion
16	(England) Stuart Bingham	Australian Goldfields Open champion
20	(England) Peter Ebdon	China Open champion

== League phase ==
=== Dates and venues ===
Week	Date	Venue
1	16 August	Embassy Theatre, Skegness, England
2	6 September	Biddulph Leisure Centre, Stoke-on-Trent, England
3	13 September	The Sands, Carlisle, England
4	27 September	Spiceball Leisure Centre, Banbury, England
5	4 October	Southampton Guildhall, Southampton, England
6	11 October	Malvern Theatres, Great Malvern, England
7	18 October	Penzance Leisure Centre, Cornwall, England (Note: After the suspension of Stephen Lee by the World Professional Billiards and Snooker Association due to suspicious betting patterns on his match against John Higgins in the sixth week of the competition, all matches involving him were declared void. The fixture at the Penzance Leisure Centre in Cornwall, England was cancelled and the match between Neil Robertson and Stuart Bingham was rescheduled to take place at the Guildford Spectrum in Guildford, England.)
8	25 October	Guildford Spectrum, Guildford, England
9	8 November	The Dome, Doncaster, England
10	15 November	Spennymoor Leisure Centre, Durham, England

=== Group one ===
Ranking	Name	(England) BIN	(Australia) ROB	(China) DIN	(England) MUR	(England) SEL	Frames W–L	Match W–D–L	Pld–Pts
1	Stuart Bingham	x	6	4	3	6	19–5	3–1–0	4–7
2	Neil Robertson	0	x	4	4	5	13–11	3–0–1	4–6
3	Ding Junhui	2	2	x	4	4	12–12	2–0–2	4–4
4	Shaun Murphy	3	2	2	x	5	12–12	1–1–2	4–3
5	Mark Selby	0	1	2	1	x	4–20	0–0–4	4–0

The top two qualified for the play-offs. If points were level then most frames won determined their positions. If two players had an identical record then the result in their match determined their positions. If their match was a 3–3 draw then the player who got to three first was higher. (Breaks above 50 shown between (parentheses); century breaks are indicated with bold.)

- Ding Junhui 4–2 Shaun Murphy → 22–(81), 55–54, (82)–0, 9–76 (63), 79–11, (64) 72–14
- Mark Selby 1–5 Neil Robertson → 11–72 (63), 12–64, 16–(72), (61) 87–37, 17–72 (62), 9–71
- Shaun Murphy 3–3 Stuart Bingham → 16–83 (53), (54) 55–(68), 0–105 (59), (88)–51, (58) 97–0, 77–53
- Neil Robertson 4–2 Shaun Murphy → 44–60, 73–58 (53), 0–(111), (70) 82–0, (113) 118–1, (58) 68–29
- Stuart Bingham 4–2 Ding Junhui → (75)–24, 79–8, 0–102 (54), 16–(73), (75)–20, (50) 80–37
- Mark Selby 2–4 Ding Junhui → 27–(96), 27–63, 25–72, 4–94 (79), 73–39, (52) 90–39
- Stuart Bingham 6–0 Mark Selby → (52) 65–56, (59) 67–0, (54) 69–0, (128)–1, (122)–1, (50) 57–13
- Stuart Bingham 6–0 Neil Robertson → (135) 139–0, 77–33, 75–66 (66), (127)–0, 61–20, (92)–0
- Mark Selby 1–5 Shaun Murphy → 6–(86), 81–1, 0–97, 22–72 (55), 0–(116), 0–(81)
- Neil Robertson 4–2 Ding Junhui → (71)–72 (53), 5–102 (95), 62–(59), (70) 83–26, 77–22, (51) 67–(57)

=== Group two ===
Ranking	Name	(England) TRU	(Scotland) HIG	(England) EBD	(Northern Ireland) ALL	(England) LEE	Frames W–L	Match W–D–L	Pld–Pts
1	Judd Trump	x	2	4	5	x	11–7	2–0–1	3–4
2	John Higgins	4	x	2	4	x	10–8	2–0–1	3–4
3	Peter Ebdon	2	4	x	2	x	8–10	1–0–2	3–2
4	Mark Allen	1	2	4	x	x	7–11	1–0–2	3–2
5	Stephen Lee	x	x	x	x	x	x–x	x–x–x	x–x

The top two qualified for the play-offs. If points were level then most frames won determined their positions. If two players had an identical record then the result in their match determined their positions. If their match was a 3–3 draw then the player who got to three first was higher. (Breaks above 50 shown between (parentheses); century breaks are indicated with bold.)

- ~~Judd Trump 5–1 Stephen Lee~~ → 57–47, (95) 96–0, 63–61, (121)–0, (113)–0, 0–(68)
- ~~Stephen Lee 1–5 Peter Ebdon~~ → 16–73, 56–60, (87) 90–2, 1–(80), 45–(83), 21–(103)
- John Higgins 4–2 Mark Allen → 0–71 (67), 69–34, 67–63, 58–70, (59) 95–39, (52) 76–30
- Mark Allen 4–2 Peter Ebdon → 34–72, (84) 92–1, (76) 81–30, (50) 75–1, 19–(108), (69)–17
- Judd Trump 4–2 Peter Ebdon → 53–60, 62–55, 7–71, (131)–0, (90)–1, 79–4
- ~~John Higgins 4–2 Stephen Lee~~ → 13–67, 59–38, 1–76, (72)–0, (57) 80–1, 66–62
- ~~Mark Allen v Stephen Lee~~
- Judd Trump 2–4 John Higgins → 79–0, 4–119 (114), 43–70 (52), 24–80, 39–84 (63), (78) 83–27
- Judd Trump 5–1 Mark Allen → 102–0, 40–74 (60), (76)–0, 81–0, (76)–54, 77–48
- John Higgins 2–4 Peter Ebdon → 29–66, (125) 130–1, (133)–0, 1–87 (75), 11–68 (61), 47–(81)

== Play-offs ==
24–25 November, Grimsby Auditorium, Grimsby, England

Semi-finals; Best of 9 frames
A1	(England) Stuart Bingham*	5
B2	(Scotland) John Higgins	4
B1	(England) Judd Trump**	5
A2	(Australia) Neil Robertson	4

Final; Best of 13 frames
A1	(England) Stuart Bingham***	7
B1	(England) Judd Trump	2

* 71–13, 74–44, 22–94 (58), 0–81 (81), (117) 132–0, 52–65, (50)–(76), (74) 74–8, (57) 71–34
** 65–77 (55), 14–68, 54–15, 0–87, 60–58, 81–0, 56–29, 45–78 (58), 71–16
***7–(83), (82)–0, (100)–8, 76–33, (55, 53) 116–9, (61) 74–5, 0–(101), (71) 115–9, 58–54

== Qualifiers ==
The qualification for this tournament, the Championship League was played in eight groups from 9 January to 22 March 2012.

== Century breaks ==
- 135, 128, 127, 122, 117, 100 – Stuart Bingham
- 133, 124, 114 – John Higgins
- 131, 121, 113, 101 – Judd Trump
- 116, 111 – Shaun Murphy
- 113 – Neil Robertson
- 108, 103 – Peter Ebdon
