= 2011 Championship League =

Championship League

Tournament information
- Dates: 3 January – 24 March 2011
- Venue: Crondon Park Golf Club
- City: Stock
- Country: England
- Organisation: Matchroom Sport
- Format: Non-ranking event
- Total prize fund: £189,400
- Winner's share: £10,000 (plus bonuses)
- Highest break: Mark Williams (WAL) (143)

Final
- Champion: Matthew Stevens (WAL)
- Runner-up: Shaun Murphy (ENG)
- Score: 3–1

The 2011 Championship League was a professional non-ranking snooker tournament that was played from 3 January to 24 March 2011 at the Crondon Park Golf Club in Stock, England.

Matthew Stevens won in the final 3–1 against Shaun Murphy and earned a place in the 2011 Premier League Snooker.

== Prize fund ==
The breakdown of prize money for this year is shown below:

- Group 1–7
  - Winner: £3,000
  - Runner-up: £2,000
  - Semi-final: £1,000
  - Frame-win (league stage): £100
  - Frame-win (play-offs): £300
  - Highest break: £500
- Winners group
  - Winner: £10,000
  - Runner-up: £5,000
  - Semi-final: £3,000
  - Frame-win: £300
  - Highest break: £1,000
- Tournament total: £189,400

== Group one ==
Group one matches were played on 3 and 4 January 2011. Mark Selby was the first player to qualify for the winners group.

=== Matches ===
- John Higgins 3–0 Mark Williams
- Shaun Murphy 0–3 Mark Selby
- Ali Carter 3–2 Stephen Maguire
- Graeme Dott 2–3 John Higgins
- Mark Williams 2–3 Shaun Murphy
- Mark Selby 1–3 Ali Carter
- Stephen Maguire 3–1 Graeme Dott
- John Higgins 1–3 Shaun Murphy
- Mark Williams 3–1 Mark Selby
- Ali Carter 3–0 Graeme Dott
- Shaun Murphy 2–3 Graeme Dott
- Stephen Maguire 2–3 Mark Selby
- John Higgins 3–1 Stephen Maguire
- Mark Williams 3–0 Ali Carter
- Mark Selby 3–1 Graeme Dott
- Shaun Murphy 3–0 Stephen Maguire
- Mark Williams 3–0 Graeme Dott
- John Higgins 3–1 Ali Carter
- Shaun Murphy 1–3 Ali Carter
- Mark Williams 3–1 Stephen Maguire
- John Higgins 3–2 Mark Selby

=== Table ===
Pos	Player	Pld	W	L	FF	FA	FD	
1	John Higgins (SCO)	6	5	1	16	9	+7	Qualification to Group 1 play-off
2	Mark Williams (WAL)	6	4	2	14	8	+6	Qualification to Group 1 play-off
3	Ali Carter (ENG)	6	4	2	13	10	+3	Qualification to Group 1 play-off
4	Mark Selby (ENG)	6	3	3	13	12	+1	Qualification to Group 1 play-off
5	Shaun Murphy (ENG)	6	3	3	12	12	0	Advances into Group 2
6	Stephen Maguire (SCO)	6	1	5	9	16	−7	Eliminated from the competition
7	Graeme Dott (SCO)	6	1	5	7	17	−10	Eliminated from the competition

=== Play-offs ===
Semi-finals; Best of 5 frames
1	John Higgins (SCO)	2
4	Mark Selby (ENG)	3
2	Mark Williams (WAL)	0
3	Ali Carter (ENG)	3

Final; Best of 5 frames
4	Mark Selby (ENG)	3
3	Ali Carter (ENG)	2

== Group two ==
Group two matches were played on 5 and 6 January 2011. Mark Williams was the second player to qualify for the winners group.

=== Matches ===
- Ali Carter 1–3 John Higgins
- Mark Williams 3–0 Shaun Murphy
- Neil Robertson 0–3 Ronnie O'Sullivan
- Jamie Cope 0–3 Ali Carter
- John Higgins 3–2 Mark Williams
- Shaun Murphy 3–2 Neil Robertson
- Ronnie O'Sullivan 3–0 Jamie Cope
- Ali Carter 1–3 Mark Williams
- John Higgins 3–2 Shaun Murphy
- Neil Robertson 3–2 Jamie Cope
- Mark Williams 3–0 Jamie Cope
- Ronnie O'Sullivan 3–2 Shaun Murphy
- Ali Carter 2–3 Ronnie O'Sullivan
- John Higgins 3–1 Neil Robertson
- Shaun Murphy 2–3 Jamie Cope
- Mark Williams 3–0 Ronnie O'Sullivan
- John Higgins 3–0 Jamie Cope
- Ali Carter 3–1 Neil Robertson
- Mark Williams 3–1 Neil Robertson
- John Higgins 0–3 Ronnie O'Sullivan
- Ali Carter 1–3 Shaun Murphy

=== Table ===
Pos	Player	Pld	W	L	FF	FA	FD	
1	Mark Williams (WAL)	6	5	1	17	5	+12	Qualification to Group 2 play-off
2	Ronnie O'Sullivan (ENG)	6	5	1	15	7	+8	Qualification to Group 2 play-off
3	John Higgins (SCO)	6	5	1	15	9	+6	Qualification to Group 2 play-off
4	Shaun Murphy (ENG)	6	2	4	12	15	−3	Qualification to Group 2 play-off
5	Ali Carter (ENG)	6	2	4	11	13	−2	Advances into Group 3
6	Neil Robertson (AUS)	6	1	5	8	17	−9	Eliminated from the competition
7	Jamie Cope (ENG)	6	1	5	5	17	−12	Eliminated from the competition

=== Play-offs ===
Semi-finals; Best of 5 frames
1	Mark Williams (WAL)	3
4	Shaun Murphy (ENG)	0
2	Ronnie O'Sullivan (ENG)	3
3	John Higgins (SCO)	0

Final; Best of 5 frames
1	Mark Williams (WAL)	3
2	Ronnie O'Sullivan (ENG)	2

== Group three ==
Group three matches were played on 24 and 25 January 2011. Ronnie O'Sullivan withdrew from the tournament ahead of this group and was replaced by Stuart Bingham. Shaun Murphy was the third player to qualify for the winners group.

=== Matches ===
- Stuart Bingham 0–3 John Higgins
- Shaun Murphy 1–3 Ali Carter
- Mark King 1–3 Peter Ebdon
- Marco Fu 1–3 Stuart Bingham
- John Higgins 0–3 Shaun Murphy
- Ali Carter 3–0 Mark King
- Peter Ebdon 1–3 Marco Fu
- Stuart Bingham 2–3 Shaun Murphy
- John Higgins 1–3 Ali Carter
- Mark King 3–2 Marco Fu
- Shaun Murphy 3–1 Marco Fu
- Peter Ebdon 3–1 Ali Carter
- Stuart Bingham 3–1 Peter Ebdon
- John Higgins 2–3 Mark King
- Ali Carter 3–1 Marco Fu
- Shaun Murphy 1–3 Peter Ebdon
- John Higgins 0–3 Marco Fu
- Stuart Bingham 1–3 Mark King
- John Higgins 3–0 Peter Ebdon
- Shaun Murphy 3–1 Mark King
- Stuart Bingham 2–3 Ali Carter

=== Table ===
Pos	Player	Pld	W	L	FF	FA	FD	
1	Ali Carter (ENG)	6	5	1	16	8	+8	Qualification to Group 3 play-off
2	Shaun Murphy (ENG)	6	4	2	14	10	+4	Qualification to Group 3 play-off
3	Peter Ebdon (ENG)	6	3	3	11	12	−1	Qualification to Group 3 play-off
4	Mark King (ENG)	6	3	3	11	14	−3	Qualification to Group 3 play-off
5	Marco Fu (HKG)	6	2	4	11	13	−2	Advances into Group 4
6	Stuart Bingham (ENG)	6	2	4	11	14	−3	Eliminated from the competition
7	John Higgins (SCO)	6	2	4	9	12	−3	Eliminated from the competition

=== Play-offs ===
Semi-finals; Best of 5 frames
1	Ali Carter (ENG)	2
4	Mark King (ENG)	3
2	Shaun Murphy (ENG)	3
3	Peter Ebdon (ENG)	2

Final; Best of 5 frames
4	Mark King (ENG)	2
2	Shaun Murphy (ENG)	3

== Group four ==
Group four matches were played on 26 and 27 January 2011. Ali Carter was the fourth player to qualify for the winners group.

=== Matches ===
- Mark King 0–3 Ali Carter
- Peter Ebdon 1–3 Marco Fu
- Stephen Hendry 1–3 Mark Allen
- Matthew Stevens 3–0 Mark King
- Ali Carter 3–0 Peter Ebdon
- Marco Fu 3–1 Stephen Hendry
- Mark Allen 1–3 Matthew Stevens
- Mark King 3–2 Peter Ebdon
- Ali Carter 1–3 Marco Fu
- Stephen Hendry 2–3 Matthew Stevens
- Peter Ebdon 3–1 Matthew Stevens
- Mark Allen 3–1 Marco Fu
- Mark King 3–2 Mark Allen
- Ali Carter 3–2 Stephen Hendry
- Marco Fu 1–3 Matthew Stevens
- Peter Ebdon 1–3 Mark Allen
- Ali Carter 2–3 Matthew Stevens
- Mark King 1–3 Stephen Hendry
- Peter Ebdon 3–2 Stephen Hendry
- Ali Carter 3–0 Mark Allen
- Mark King 3–2 Marco Fu

=== Table ===
Pos	Player	Pld	W	L	FF	FA	FD	
1	Matthew Stevens (WAL)	6	5	1	16	9	+7	Qualification to Group 4 play-off
2	Ali Carter (ENG)	6	4	2	15	8	+7	Qualification to Group 4 play-off
3	Marco Fu (HKG)	6	3	3	13	12	+1	Qualification to Group 4 play-off
4	Mark Allen (NIR)	6	3	3	12	12	0	Qualification to Group 4 play-off
5	Mark King (ENG)	6	3	3	10	15	−5	Advances into Group 5
6	Peter Ebdon (ENG)	6	2	4	10	15	−5	Eliminated from the competition
7	Stephen Hendry (SCO)	6	1	5	11	16	−5	Eliminated from the competition

=== Play-offs ===
Semi-finals; Best of 5 frames
1	Matthew Stevens (WAL)	0
4	Mark Allen (NIR)	3
2	Ali Carter (ENG)	3
3	Marco Fu (HKG)	2

Final; Best of 5 frames
4	Mark Allen (NIR)	1
2	Ali Carter (ENG)	3

== Group five ==
Group five matches were played on 28 February and 1 March 2011. Marco Fu was to play in this group, but he moved to group seven and was replaced by Ryan Day, who went on to win the group.

=== Matches ===
- Mark Allen 3–0 Matthew Stevens
- Ryan Day 0–3 Mark King
- Ding Junhui 3–0 Ricky Walden
- Liang Wenbo 2–3 Mark Allen
- Matthew Stevens 3–2 Ryan Day
- Mark King 2–3 Ding Junhui
- Ricky Walden 0–3 Liang Wenbo
- Mark Allen 1–3 Ryan Day
- Matthew Stevens 0–3 Mark King
- Ding Junhui 1–3 Liang Wenbo
- Ryan Day 3–2 Liang Wenbo
- Ricky Walden 3–2 Mark King
- Mark Allen 3–0 Ricky Walden
- Matthew Stevens 3–0 Ding Junhui
- Mark King 3–1 Liang Wenbo
- Ryan Day 3–2 Ricky Walden
- Matthew Stevens 0–3 Liang Wenbo
- Mark Allen 3–2 Ding Junhui
- Ryan Day 3–1 Ding Junhui
- Matthew Stevens 3–1 Ricky Walden
- Mark Allen 3–0 Mark King

=== Table ===
Pos	Player	Pld	W	L	FF	FA	FD	
1	Mark Allen (NIR)	6	5	1	16	7	+9	Qualification to Group 5 play-off
2	Ryan Day (WAL)	6	4	2	14	12	+2	Qualification to Group 5 play-off
3	Liang Wenbo (CHN)	6	3	3	14	10	+4	Qualification to Group 5 play-off
4	Mark King (ENG)	6	3	3	13	10	+3	Qualification to Group 5 play-off
5	Matthew Stevens (WAL)	6	3	3	9	12	−3	Advances into Group 6
6	Ding Junhui (CHN)	6	2	4	10	14	−4	Eliminated from the competition
7	Ricky Walden (ENG)	6	1	5	6	17	−11	Eliminated from the competition

=== Play-offs ===
Semi-finals; Best of 5 frames
1	Mark Allen (NIR)	3
4	Mark King (ENG)	2
2	Ryan Day (WAL)	3
3	Liang Wenbo (CHN)	2

Final; Best of 5 frames
1	Mark Allen (NIR)	0
2	Ryan Day (WAL)	3

== Group six ==
Group six matches were played on 2 and 3 March 2011. Mark Allen was the sixth player to qualify for the winners group.

=== Matches ===
- Mark Allen 2–3 Liang Wenbo
- Mark King 3–0 Matthew Stevens
- Judd Trump 3–2 Mark Davis
- Stephen Lee 3–2 Mark Allen
- Liang Wenbo 2–3 Mark King
- Matthew Stevens 2–3 Judd Trump
- Mark Davis 3–2 Stephen Lee
- Mark Allen 3–0 Mark King
- Liang Wenbo 2–3 Matthew Stevens
- Judd Trump 2–3 Stephen Lee
- Mark King 0–3 Stephen Lee
- Mark Davis 0–3 Matthew Stevens
- Mark Allen 3–0 Mark Davis
- Liang Wenbo 3–1 Judd Trump
- Matthew Stevens 3–0 Stephen Lee
- Mark King 3–1 Mark Davis
- Liang Wenbo 1–3 Stephen Lee
- Mark Allen 3–0 Judd Trump
- Mark King 3–1 Judd Trump
- Liang Wenbo 3–0 Mark Davis
- Mark Allen 1–3 Matthew Stevens

=== Table ===
Pos	Player	Pld	W	L	FF	FA	FD	
1	Matthew Stevens (WAL)	6	4	2	14	9	+5	Qualification to Group 6 play-off
2	Stephen Lee (ENG)	6	4	2	14	11	+3	Qualification to Group 6 play-off
3	Mark King (ENG)	6	4	2	12	10	+2	Qualification to Group 6 play-off
4	Mark Allen (NIR)	6	3	3	14	9	+5	Qualification to Group 6 play-off
5	Liang Wenbo (CHN)	6	3	3	14	12	+2	Advances into Group 7
6	Judd Trump (ENG)	6	2	4	10	16	−6	Eliminated from the competition
7	Mark Davis (ENG)	6	1	5	6	17	−11	Eliminated from the competition

=== Play-offs ===
Semi-finals; Best of 5 frames
1	Matthew Stevens (WAL)	0
4	Mark Allen (NIR)	3
2	Stephen Lee (ENG)	3
3	Mark King (ENG)	1

Final; Best of 5 frames
4	Mark Allen (NIR)	3
2	Stephen Lee (ENG)	0

== Group seven ==
Group seven matches were played on 21 and 22 March 2011. Matthew Stevens was the last player to qualify for the winners group.

=== Matches ===
- Stephen Lee 3–2 Marco Fu
- Mark King 3–1 Liang Wenbo
- Martin Gould 0–3 Andrew Higginson
- Matthew Stevens 1–3 Stephen Lee
- Matthew Stevens 3–2 Mark King
- Liang Wenbo 2–3 Martin Gould
- Andrew Higginson 0–3 Marco Fu
- Stephen Lee 3–2 Mark King
- Matthew Stevens 2–3 Liang Wenbo
- Martin Gould 0–3 Marco Fu
- Mark King 3–1 Marco Fu
- Andrew Higginson 0–3 Liang Wenbo
- Stephen Lee 0–3 Andrew Higginson
- Matthew Stevens 3–1 Martin Gould
- Liang Wenbo 3–1 Marco Fu
- Mark King 2–3 Andrew Higginson
- Matthew Stevens 3–1 Marco Fu
- Stephen Lee 3–1 Martin Gould
- Mark King 1–3 Martin Gould
- Matthew Stevens 3–2 Andrew Higginson
- Stephen Lee 0–3 Liang Wenbo

=== Table ===
Pos	Player	Pld	W	L	FF	FA	FD	
1	Liang Wenbo (CHN)	6	4	2	15	9	+6	Qualification to Group 7 play-off
2	Matthew Stevens (WAL)	6	4	2	15	12	+3	Qualification to Group 7 play-off
3	Stephen Lee (ENG)	6	4	2	12	12	0	Qualification to Group 7 play-off
4	Andrew Higginson (ENG)	6	3	3	11	11	0	Qualification to Group 7 play-off
5	Mark King (ENG)	6	2	4	13	14	−1	Eliminated from the competition
6	Marco Fu (HKG)	6	2	4	11	12	−1	Eliminated from the competition
7	Martin Gould (ENG)	6	2	4	8	15	−7	Eliminated from the competition

=== Play-offs ===
Semi-finals; Best of 5 frames
1	Liang Wenbo (CHN)	3
4	Andrew Higginson (ENG)	2
2	Matthew Stevens (WAL)	3
3	Stephen Lee (ENG)	1

Final; Best of 5 frames
1	Liang Wenbo (CHN)	0
2	Matthew Stevens (WAL)	3

== Winners group ==
The matches of the winners group were played on 23 and 24 March 2011. Matthew Stevens has qualified for the 2011 Premier League.

=== Matches ===
- Mark Selby 1–3 Mark Williams
- Shaun Murphy 3–1 Ali Carter
- Ryan Day 2–3 Mark Allen
- Matthew Stevens 1–3 Mark Selby
- Mark Williams 1–3 Shaun Murphy
- Ali Carter 3–0 Ryan Day
- Mark Allen 0–3 Matthew Stevens
- Mark Selby 3–2 Shaun Murphy
- Mark Williams 2–3 Ali Carter
- Ryan Day 0–3 Matthew Stevens
- Shaun Murphy 2–3 Matthew Stevens
- Mark Allen 3–2 Ali Carter
- Mark Selby 2–3 Mark Allen
- Mark Williams 3–2 Ryan Day
- Ali Carter 2–3 Matthew Stevens
- Shaun Murphy 3–1 Mark Allen
- Mark Williams 1–3 Matthew Stevens
- Mark Selby 1–3 Ryan Day
- Shaun Murphy 2–3 Ryan Day
- Mark Williams 3–0 Mark Allen
- Mark Selby 0–3 Ali Carter

=== Table ===
Pos	Player	Pld	W	L	FF	FA	FD	
1	Matthew Stevens (WAL)	6	5	1	16	8	+8	Qualification to Winners' Group play-off
2	Shaun Murphy (ENG)	6	3	3	15	12	+3	Qualification to Winners' Group play-off
3	Ali Carter (ENG)	6	3	3	14	11	+3	Qualification to Winners' Group play-off
4	Mark Williams (WAL)	6	3	3	13	12	+1	Qualification to Winners' Group play-off
5	Mark Allen (NIR)	6	3	3	10	15	−5	Eliminated from the competition
6	Ryan Day (WAL)	6	2	4	10	15	−5	Eliminated from the competition
7	Mark Selby (ENG)	6	2	4	10	15	−5	Eliminated from the competition

=== Play-offs ===
Semi-finals; Best of 5 frames
1	Matthew Stevens (WAL)	3
4	Mark Williams (WAL)	1
2	Shaun Murphy (ENG)	3
3	Ali Carter (ENG)	2

Final; Best of 5 frames
1	Matthew Stevens (WAL)	3
2	Shaun Murphy (ENG)	1

== Century breaks ==
Total: 86

- **143** (W), 141, **138** (2), 137, 119, 107 – Mark Williams
- **142** (1), 138, 133, 109, 106, 104 – John Higgins
- **140** (6), 131, 117, 104 – Liang Wenbo
- **139** (3), 137, 122, 112, 107, 101, 101, 100 – Shaun Murphy
- **138** (2), 132, 115, 113, 108, 101 – Ronnie O'Sullivan
- **136** (5), 127, 122, 112, 108, 105 – Mark King
- 137 – Graeme Dott
- **136** (5), **134** (4), **134** (7), 128, 126, 122, 116, 111, 108, 106, 101, 101, 100 – Matthew Stevens
- 135, 124 – Mark Selby
- 133 – Neil Robertson
- 133, 126, 112, 109, 108, 102 – Marco Fu
- 131, 121, 120, 119, 118, 115, 103, 101, 101, 100, 100 – Mark Allen
- 129 – Stephen Hendry
- 122, 115 – Ding Junhui
- 121, 117, 108, 102, 101, 101, 100 – Ali Carter
- 117 – Stephen Lee
- 114, 112, 102 – Ryan Day
- 103 – Martin Gould
- 102 – Andrew Higginson

Bold: highest break in the indicated group.

== Winnings ==
No.	Player	1	2	3	4	5	6	7	W	TOTAL
1	Matthew Stevens (WAL)				**3,100**	**1,150**	2,400	**6,800**	16,600	30,050
2	Ali Carter (ENG)	4,800	1,100	3,200	6,300				7,800	23,200
3	Shaun Murphy (ENG)	1,200	2,200	**6,700**					10,700	20,800
4	Mark Allen (NIR)				4,400	4,500	6,200		3,000	18,100
5	Mark Williams (WAL)	2,400	**6,750**						**8,200**	17,350
6	Mark King (ENG)			4,600	1,000	**3,150**	2,500	1,300		12,550
7	Liang Wenbo (CHN)					3,000	**1,900**	4,400		9,300
8	Ryan Day (WAL)					6,200			3,000	9,200
9	Mark Selby (ENG)	6,100							3,000	9,100
10	John Higgins (SCO)	**3,700**	2,500	900						7,100
11	Stephen Lee (ENG)						4,300	2,500		6,800
12	Ronnie O'Sullivan (ENG)		**5,250**							5,250
13	Marco Fu (HKG)			1,100	2,900			1,100		5,100
14	Peter Ebdon (ENG)			2,700	1,000					3,700
15	Andrew Higginson (ENG)							2,700		2,700
16	Stephen Hendry (SCO)				1,100					1,100
=	Stuart Bingham (ENG)			1,100						1,100
18	Ding Junhui (CHN)					1,000				1,000
=	Judd Trump (ENG)						1,000			1,000
20	Stephen Maguire (SCO)	900								900
21	Neil Robertson (AUS)		800							800
=	Martin Gould (ENG)							800		800
23	Graeme Dott (SCO)	700								700
24	Ricky Walden (ENG)					600				600
=	Mark Davis (ENG)						600			600
26	Jamie Cope (ENG)		500							500
	Total prize money	19,800	19,100	20,300	19,800	19,600	18,900	19,600	52,300	189,400

Green: Won the group. Bold: Highest break in the group. All prize money in GBP.
