= 2010 Premier League Snooker =

PartyCasino.com Premier League

Tournament information
- Dates: 2 September – 28 November 2010
- Country: United Kingdom
- Organisation: Matchroom Sport
- Format: Non-ranking event
- Total prize fund: £200,000
- Winner's share: £30,000
- Highest break: (England) Ronnie O'Sullivan (139)

Final
- Champion: (England) Ronnie O'Sullivan
- Runner-up: (England) Shaun Murphy
- Score: 7–1

The 2010 PartyCasino.com Premier League was a professional non-ranking snooker tournament that was played from 2 September to 28 November 2010.

Shaun Murphy was the defending champion, but Ronnie O'Sullivan defeated him 7–1 in the final.

== Prize fund ==
The breakdown of prize money for this year is shown below:

- Winner: £30,000
- Runner-up: £15,000
- Semi-final: £5,000
- Frame-win: £1,000
- Century break: £1,000 (only in league phase)
- Maximum break: £25,000
- Total: £200,000

== League phase ==
Ranking	Name	(England) OSU	(Hong Kong) FU	(England) MUR	(Australia) ROB	(Wales) WIL	(England) SEL	(China) DIN	Frames W–L	Match W–D–L	Pld–Pts
1	Ronnie O'Sullivan	x	3	3	5	4	5	3	23–13	3–3–0	6–9
2	Marco Fu	3	x	4	4	3	1	5	20–16	3–2–1	6–8
3	Shaun Murphy	3	2	x	2	4	3	5	19–17	2–2–2	6–6
4	Neil Robertson	1	2	4	x	3	2	6	18–18	2–1–3	6–5
5	Mark Williams	2	3	2	3	x	4	3	17–19	1–3–2	6–5
6	Mark Selby	1	5	3	4	2	x	2	17–19	2–1–3	6–5
7	Ding Junhui	3	1	1	0	3	4	x	12–24	1–2–3	6–4

Top four qualified for the play-offs. If points were level then most frames won determined their positions. If two players had an identical record then the result in their match determined their positions. If that ended 3–3 then the player who got to three first was higher. (Breaks above 50 shown between (parentheses); century breaks are indicated with bold.)

- 2 September – Southampton Guildhall, Southampton, England
  - Shaun Murphy 5–1 Ding Junhui → 71–(51), 69–38, 0–128 (65, 63), (124)–0, (55) 86–31, (109)–0
  - Ronnie O'Sullivan 3–3 Marco Fu → 4–70 (63), (76, 61) 137–0, 34–71, (119) 141–0, 0–(87), (103)–36
- 16 September – Plymouth Pavilions, Plymouth, England
  - Mark Selby 2–4 Mark Williams → (101)–3, (84) 85–0, 0–(113), 52–61, 0–82, 3–73
  - Ronnie O'Sullivan 3–3 Ding Junhui 8–128 (122), 71–33, (119)–0, 0–95 (89), (67)–7, 44–53
- 30 September – Guildhall, Preston, England
  - Marco Fu 4–2 Shaun Murphy → (76)–(55), 0–84, 0–83 (77), 68–54, (67) 72–1, 60–(55)
  - Ding Junhui 3–3 Mark Williams → 36–76 (54), 0–90 (73), (68)–21, (65)–16, 16–63, 73–5
  - Neil Robertson 2–4 Mark Selby → 25–67 (53), (69) 79–8, 0–108 (104), 55–74, (78)–0, 0–123 (119)
- 7 October – Brentwood Leisure Centre, Brentwood, England
  - Mark Selby 2–4 Ding Junhui → 0–123 (54, 69), (50) 70–49, 0–(78), 9–74 (69), 1–(103), (97)–0
  - Ronnie O'Sullivan 3–3 Shaun Murphy → 71–66, 5–104 (90), (93)–0, 15–72 (71), 51–64, (110)–0
- 14 October – Inverness Leisure Centre, Inverness, Scotland
  - Mark Selby 5–1 Marco Fu → (90)–0, 24–101 (68), (64) 98–0, (53) 72–40, (131)–0, (90)–0
  - Neil Robertson 3–3 Mark Williams → 53–59, 79–39, 0–78 (70), (55) 82–25, 7–109 (105), (65) 73–1
- 21 October – Spiceball Leisure Centre, Banbury, England
  - Neil Robertson 6–0 Ding Junhui → (120)–0, 74–33, 72–44, 97–12, (87)–7, (51) 73–25
  - Marco Fu 3–3 Mark Williams → 63–45, 45–54, 0–125 (104), (51) 66–9, (78) 122–8, 0–(122)
- 28 October – Penrith Leisure Centre, Penrith, England
  - Marco Fu 5–1 Ding Junhui → 94–2, 81–21, 65–0, (94)–5, 0–77 (71), (107)–20
  - Ronnie O'Sullivan 4–2 Mark Williams → (98) 99–0, (78) 123–0, 16–61, (70) 74–38, (50) 103–15, 4–78
- 4 November – Hutton Moor Leisure Centre, Weston-super-Mare, England
  - Marco Fu 4–2 Neil Robertson → 44–82 (70), 77–12, 58–(57), 83–82, (67) 74–39, 28–(90)
  - Shaun Murphy 3–3 Mark Selby → (80)–0, 0–(100), (52, 58) 114–3, 19–60, 0–(91), 96–64 (56)
- 11 November – Grimsby Auditorium, Grimsby, England
  - Shaun Murphy 4–2 Mark Williams → (64) 69–36, (97) 101–0, 0–84 (54), 69–58, 61–58, 63–35
  - Ronnie O'Sullivan 5–1 Neil Robertson → (80) 83–40, 85–20, (84) 128–0, (130) 134–0, 32–64, (79)–(59)
- 18 November – Venue Cymru, Llandudno, Wales
  - Ronnie O'Sullivan 5–1 Mark Selby → (56) 67–49, 68–43, (80) 87–12, 48–79, (116)–4, 66–52
  - Shaun Murphy 2–4 Neil Robertson → 56–17, 33–(67), 0–(116), (98) 108–0, 0–(124), 29–70 (52)

== Play-offs ==
27–28 November – Potters Leisure Resort, Hopton-on-Sea, England

Semi-finals; Best of 9 frames
1	(England) Ronnie O'Sullivan*	5
4	(Australia) Neil Robertson	1
2	(Hong Kong) Marco Fu	2
3	(England) Shaun Murphy**	5

Final; Best of 13 frames
1	(England) Ronnie O'Sullivan***	7
3	(England) Shaun Murphy	1

* (61) 74–34, 8–91 (65), (82) 90–0, (139)–0, (102)–0, (77) 78–52 (51)
** (83)–0, 70–5, 0–116 (103), 0–(81), 0–(97), 0–97 (69), 0–72 (68)
*** (74) 81–12, (123)–0, (59) 82–34, 84–32, 67–35, 43–68, (68) 77–0, (51) 83–28

== Qualifiers ==
The qualification for this tournament, the Championship League was played in eight groups from 4 January to 25 March 2010.

== Century breaks ==
- 139, 130, 123, 119, 119, 116, 110, 103, 102 – Ronnie O'Sullivan
- 131, 119, 104, 101, 100 – Mark Selby
- 124, 120, 116 – Neil Robertson
- 124, 109, 103 – Shaun Murphy
- 122, 113, 105, 104 – Mark Williams
- 122, 103 – Ding Junhui
- 107 – Marco Fu
