= 2008 Championship League =

Championship League
Tournament information
- Dates: 25 February – 15 May 2008
- Venue: Crondon Park Golf Club
- City: Stock
- Country: England
- Organisation: Matchroom Sport
- Format: Non-ranking event
- Total prize fund: £175,600
- Winner's share: £10,000 (plus bonuses)
- Highest break: Ali Carter (ENG) (143)x2 Dave Harold (ENG) (143)

Final
- Champion: Joe Perry (ENG)
- Runner-up: Mark Selby (ENG)
- Score: 3–1

The 2008 Championship League was a professional non-ranking snooker tournament that was played from 25 February to 15 May 2008 at the Crondon Park Golf Club in Stock, England.

Joe Perry won in the final 3–1 against Mark Selby, and earned a place in the 2008 Premier League Snooker.

Ali Carter played in all seven qualifying groups.

== Prize fund ==
The breakdown of prize money for this year is shown below:

- Group 1–7
  - Winner: £3,000
  - Runner-up: £2,000
  - Semi-final: £1,000
  - Frame-win in league stage: £100
  - Frame-win in play-offs: £300
- Winners group
  - Winner: £10,000
  - Runner-up: £5,000
  - Semi-final: £3,000
  - Frame-win in league stage: £200
  - Frame-win in play-offs: £300
- Tournament total: £175,600

== Group one ==
Group one matches were played on 25 and 26 February 2008. Ryan Day was the first player to qualify for the winners group.

=== Group one league matches ===
- Ken Doherty 3–1 Mark Williams
- Ali Carter 0–4 Ryan Day
- Joe Perry 2–2 Barry Hawkins
- Matthew Stevens 1–3 Ken Doherty
- Mark Williams 3–1 Ali Carter
- Ryan Day 1–3 Joe Perry
- Barry Hawkins 1–3 Matthew Stevens
- Ken Doherty 1–3 Ali Carter
- Mark Williams 2–2 Ryan Day
- Joe Perry 2–2 Matthew Stevens
- Ali Carter 4–0 Matthew Stevens
- Barry Hawkins 3–1 Ryan Day
- Ken Doherty 2–2 Barry Hawkins
- Mark Williams 1–3 Joe Perry
- Ryan Day 2–2 Matthew Stevens
- Ali Carter 3–1 Barry Hawkins
- Ken Doherty 2–2 Joe Perry
- Mark Williams 2–2 Matthew Stevens
- Mark Williams 3–1 Barry Hawkins
- Ali Carter 2–2 Joe Perry
- Ken Doherty 1–3 Ryan Day

=== Group one league table ===
| Pos | Player | Pld | W | D | L | Pts | FF | FA | FD | |
|---|---|---|---|---|---|---|---|---|---|---|
| 1 | Joe Perry (ENG) | 6 | 2 | 4 | 0 | 8 | 14 | 10 | +4 | Qualification to Group 1 play-off |
| 2 | Ali Carter (ENG) | 6 | 3 | 1 | 2 | 7 | 13 | 11 | +2 | Qualification to Group 1 play-off |
| 3 | Ryan Day (WAL) | 6 | 2 | 2 | 2 | 6 | 13 | 11 | +2 | Qualification to Group 1 play-off |
| 4 | Ken Doherty (IRL) | 6 | 2 | 2 | 2 | 6 | 12 | 12 | 0 | Qualification to Group 1 play-off |
| 5 | Mark Williams (WAL) | 6 | 2 | 2 | 2 | 6 | 12 | 12 | 0 | Advances into Group 2 |
| 6 | Matthew Stevens (WAL) | 6 | 1 | 3 | 2 | 5 | 10 | 14 | −4 | Eliminated from the competition |
| 7 | Barry Hawkins (ENG) | 6 | 1 | 2 | 3 | 4 | 10 | 14 | −4 | Eliminated from the competition |

=== Group one league play-offs ===
Semi-finals; Best of 5 frames
1 | Joe Perry (ENG) | 3
4 | Ken Doherty (IRL) | 0
2 | Ali Carter (ENG) | 1
3 | Ryan Day (WAL) | 3

Final; Best of 5 frames
1 | Joe Perry (ENG) | 2
3 | Ryan Day (WAL) | 3

== Group two ==
Group two matches were played on 27 and 28 February 2008. Ken Doherty was the second player to qualify for the winners group.

=== Group two league matches ===
- Joe Perry 2–2 Ali Carter
- Ken Doherty 3–1 Mark Williams
- Joe Swail 1–3 Nigel Bond
- Anthony Hamilton 3–1 Joe Perry
- Ali Carter 3–1 Ken Doherty
- Mark Williams 1–3 Joe Swail
- Nigel Bond 2–2 Anthony Hamilton
- Joe Perry 1–3 Ken Doherty
- Ali Carter 4–0 Mark Williams
- Joe Swail 1–3 Anthony Hamilton
- Ken Doherty 2–2 Anthony Hamilton
- Nigel Bond 1–3 Mark Williams
- Joe Perry 2–2 Nigel Bond
- Ali Carter 2–2 Joe Swail
- Mark Williams 4–0 Anthony Hamilton
- Ken Doherty 3–1 Nigel Bond
- Joe Perry 3–1 Joe Swail
- Ali Carter 1–3 Anthony Hamilton
- Ali Carter 3–1 Nigel Bond
- Ken Doherty 1–3 Joe Swail
- Joe Perry 3–1 Mark Williams

=== Group two league table ===
| Pos | Player | Pld | W | D | L | Pts | FF | FA | FD | |
|---|---|---|---|---|---|---|---|---|---|---|
| 1 | Ali Carter (ENG) | 6 | 3 | 2 | 1 | 8 | 15 | 9 | +6 | Qualification to Group 2 play-off |
| 2 | Anthony Hamilton (ENG) | 6 | 3 | 2 | 1 | 8 | 13 | 11 | +2 | Qualification to Group 2 play-off |
| 3 | Ken Doherty (IRL) | 6 | 3 | 1 | 2 | 7 | 13 | 11 | +2 | Qualification to Group 2 play-off |
| 4 | Joe Perry (ENG) | 6 | 2 | 2 | 2 | 6 | 12 | 12 | 0 | Qualification to Group 2 play-off |
| 5 | Joe Swail (NIR) | 6 | 2 | 1 | 3 | 5 | 11 | 13 | −2 | Advances into Group 3 |
| 6 | Mark Williams (WAL) | 6 | 2 | 0 | 4 | 4 | 10 | 14 | −4 | Eliminated from the competition |
| 7 | Nigel Bond (ENG) | 6 | 1 | 2 | 3 | 4 | 10 | 14 | −4 | Eliminated from the competition |

=== Group two league play-offs ===
Semi-finals; Best of 5 frames
1 | Ali Carter (ENG) | 3
4 | Joe Perry (ENG) | 2
2 | Anthony Hamilton (ENG) | 0
3 | Ken Doherty (IRL) | 3

Final; Best of 5 frames
1 | Ali Carter (ENG) | 2
3 | Ken Doherty (IRL) | 3

== Group three ==
Group three matches were played on 10 and 11 March 2008. Anthony Hamilton was the third player to qualify for the winners group.

=== Group three league matches ===
- Ali Carter 2–2 Anthony Hamilton
- Michael Holt 1–3 Joe Swail
- Shaun Murphy 3–1 Mark Selby
- Stuart Bingham 0–4 Ali Carter
- Anthony Hamilton 3–1 Michael Holt
- Joe Swail 1–3 Shaun Murphy
- Mark Selby 2–2 Stuart Bingham
- Ali Carter 3–1 Michael Holt
- Anthony Hamilton 4–0 Joe Swail
- Shaun Murphy 3–1 Stuart Bingham
- Michael Holt 2–2 Stuart Bingham
- Mark Selby 3–1 Joe Swail
- Ali Carter 3–1 Mark Selby
- Anthony Hamilton 1–3 Shaun Murphy
- Joe Swail 2–2 Stuart Bingham
- Michael Holt 1–3 Mark Selby
- Ali Carter 2–2 Shaun Murphy
- Anthony Hamilton 2–2 Stuart Bingham
- Anthony Hamilton 1–3 Mark Selby
- Michael Holt 0–4 Shaun Murphy
- Ali Carter 4–0 Joe Swail

=== Group three league table ===
| Pos | Player | Pld | W | D | L | Pts | FF | FA | FD | |
|---|---|---|---|---|---|---|---|---|---|---|
| 1 | Shaun Murphy (ENG) | 6 | 5 | 1 | 0 | 11 | 18 | 6 | +12 | Qualification to Group 3 play-off |
| 2 | Ali Carter (ENG) | 6 | 4 | 2 | 0 | 10 | 18 | 6 | +12 | Qualification to Group 3 play-off |
| 3 | Mark Selby (ENG) | 6 | 3 | 1 | 2 | 7 | 13 | 11 | +2 | Qualification to Group 3 play-off |
| 4 | Anthony Hamilton (ENG) | 6 | 2 | 2 | 2 | 6 | 13 | 11 | +2 | Qualification to Group 3 play-off |
| 5 | Stuart Bingham (ENG) | 6 | 0 | 4 | 2 | 4 | 9 | 15 | −6 | Advances into Group 4 |
| 6 | Joe Swail (NIR) | 6 | 1 | 1 | 4 | 3 | 7 | 17 | −10 | Eliminated from the competition |
| 7 | Michael Holt (ENG) | 6 | 0 | 1 | 5 | 1 | 6 | 18 | −12 | Eliminated from the competition |

=== Group three league play-offs ===
Semi-finals; Best of 5 frames
1 | Shaun Murphy (ENG) | 1
4 | Anthony Hamilton (ENG) | 3
2 | Ali Carter (ENG) | 3
3 | Mark Selby (ENG) | 2

Final; Best of 5 frames
4 | Anthony Hamilton (ENG) | 3
2 | Ali Carter (ENG) | 2

== Group four ==
Group four matches were played on 12 and 13 March 2008. Shaun Murphy was the fourth player to qualify for the winners group.

=== Group four league matches ===
- Shaun Murphy 1–3 Ali Carter
- Mark Allen 2–2 Stuart Bingham
- Jamie Cope 0–4 Shaun Murphy
- Joe Perry 2–2 Mark King
- Ali Carter 2–2 Mark Allen
- Stuart Bingham 2–2 Joe Perry
- Mark King 3–1 Jamie Cope
- Shaun Murphy 1–3 Mark Allen
- Ali Carter 2–2 Stuart Bingham
- Joe Perry 1–3 Jamie Cope
- Mark Allen 3–1 Jamie Cope
- Mark King 3–1 Stuart Bingham
- Shaun Murphy 3–1 Mark King
- Ali Carter 2–2 Joe Perry
- Stuart Bingham 2–2 Jamie Cope
- Mark Allen 2–2 Mark King
- Shaun Murphy 2–2 Joe Perry
- Ali Carter 3–1 Jamie Cope
- Joe Perry 3–1 Mark Allen
- Ali Carter 2–2 Mark King
- Shaun Murphy 3–1 Stuart Bingham

=== Group four league table ===
| Pos | Player | Pld | W | D | L | Pts | FF | FA | FD | |
|---|---|---|---|---|---|---|---|---|---|---|
| 1 | Ali Carter (ENG) | 6 | 2 | 4 | 0 | 8 | 14 | 10 | +4 | Qualification to Group 4 play-off |
| 2 | Shaun Murphy (ENG) | 6 | 3 | 1 | 2 | 7 | 14 | 10 | +4 | Qualification to Group 4 play-off |
| 3 | Mark King (ENG) | 6 | 2 | 3 | 1 | 7 | 13 | 11 | +2 | Qualification to Group 4 play-off |
| 4 | Mark Allen (NIR) | 6 | 2 | 3 | 1 | 7 | 13 | 11 | +2 | Qualification to Group 4 play-off |
| 5 | Joe Perry (ENG) | 6 | 1 | 4 | 1 | 6 | 12 | 12 | 0 | Advances into Group 5 |
| 6 | Stuart Bingham (ENG) | 6 | 0 | 4 | 2 | 4 | 10 | 14 | −4 | Eliminated from the competition |
| 7 | Jamie Cope (ENG) | 6 | 1 | 1 | 4 | 3 | 8 | 16 | −8 | Eliminated from the competition |

=== Group four league play-offs ===
Semi-finals; Best of 5 frames
1 | Ali Carter (ENG) | 3
4 | Mark Allen (NIR) | 2
2 | Shaun Murphy (ENG) | 3
3 | Mark King (ENG) | 0

Final; Best of 5 frames
1 | Ali Carter (ENG) | 2
2 | Shaun Murphy (ENG) | 3

== Group five ==
Group five matches were played on 14 and 15 April 2008. Joe Perry was the fifth player to qualify for the winners group.

=== Group five league matches ===
- Ali Carter 2–2 Mark King
- Mark Allen 2–2 Joe Perry
- Stephen Lee 0–4 Neil Robertson
- Dominic Dale 0–4 Ali Carter
- Mark King 2–2 Mark Allen
- Joe Perry 2–2 Stephen Lee
- Neil Robertson 3–1 Dominic Dale
- Ali Carter 2–2 Mark Allen
- Joe Perry 1–3 Mark King
- Stephen Lee 2–2 Dominic Dale
- Mark Allen 4–0 Dominic Dale
- Neil Robertson 2–2 Joe Perry
- Ali Carter 1–3 Neil Robertson
- Mark King 4–0 Stephen Lee
- Joe Perry 3–1 Dominic Dale
- Mark Allen 1–3 Neil Robertson
- Ali Carter 1–3 Stephen Lee
- Mark King 2–2 Dominic Dale
- Mark King 3–1 Neil Robertson
- Mark Allen 3–1 Stephen Lee
- Ali Carter 0–4 Joe Perry

=== Group five league table ===
| Pos | Player | Pld | W | D | L | Pts | FF | FA | FD | |
|---|---|---|---|---|---|---|---|---|---|---|
| 1 | Mark King (ENG) | 6 | 3 | 3 | 0 | 9 | 16 | 8 | +8 | Qualification to Group 5 play-off |
| 2 | Neil Robertson (AUS) | 6 | 4 | 1 | 1 | 9 | 16 | 8 | +8 | Qualification to Group 5 play-off |
| 3 | Joe Perry (ENG) | 6 | 2 | 3 | 1 | 7 | 14 | 10 | +4 | Qualification to Group 5 play-off |
| 4 | Mark Allen (NIR) | 6 | 2 | 3 | 1 | 7 | 14 | 10 | +4 | Qualification to Group 5 play-off |
| 5 | Ali Carter (ENG) | 6 | 1 | 2 | 3 | 4 | 10 | 14 | −4 | Advances into Group 6 |
| 6 | Stephen Lee (ENG) | 6 | 1 | 2 | 3 | 4 | 8 | 16 | −8 | Eliminated from the competition |
| 7 | Dominic Dale (WAL) | 6 | 0 | 2 | 4 | 2 | 6 | 18 | −12 | Eliminated from the competition |

=== Group five league play-offs ===
Semi-finals; Best of 5 frames
1 | Mark King (ENG) | 3
4 | Mark Allen (NIR) | 1
2 | Neil Robertson (AUS) | 1
3 | Joe Perry (ENG) | 3

Final; Best of 5 frames
1 | Mark King (ENG) | 1
3 | Joe Perry (ENG) | 3

== Group six ==
Group six matches were played on 16 and 17 April 2008. Mark Selby was the sixth player to qualify for the winners group.

=== Group six league matches ===
- Mark King 3–1 Mark Allen
- Neil Robertson 3–1 Ali Carter
- Mark Selby 3–1 Gerard Greene
- Jimmy White 3–1 Mark King
- Ali Carter 1–3 Mark Selby
- Mark Allen 1–3 Neil Robertson
- Gerard Greene 1–3 Jimmy White
- Mark King 2–2 Neil Robertson
- Mark Allen 1–3 Ali Carter
- Mark Selby 4–0 Jimmy White
- Neil Robertson 3–1 Jimmy White
- Gerard Greene 1–3 Ali Carter
- Mark Selby 3–1 Mark Allen
- Mark King 2–2 Gerard Greene
- Ali Carter 4–0 Jimmy White
- Neil Robertson 3–1 Gerard Greene
- Mark Selby 2–2 Mark King
- Mark Allen 1–3 Jimmy White
- Mark Allen 3–1 Gerard Greene
- Neil Robertson 2–2 Mark Selby
- Mark King 3–1 Ali Carter

=== Group six league table ===
| Pos | Player | Pld | W | D | L | Pts | FF | FA | FD | |
|---|---|---|---|---|---|---|---|---|---|---|
| 1 | Mark Selby (ENG) | 6 | 4 | 2 | 0 | 10 | 17 | 7 | +10 | Qualification to Group 6 play-off |
| 2 | Neil Robertson (AUS) | 6 | 4 | 2 | 0 | 10 | 16 | 8 | +8 | Qualification to Group 6 play-off |
| 3 | Mark King (ENG) | 6 | 2 | 3 | 1 | 7 | 13 | 11 | +2 | Qualification to Group 6 play-off |
| 4 | Ali Carter (ENG) | 6 | 3 | 0 | 3 | 6 | 13 | 11 | +2 | Qualification to Group 6 play-off |
| 5 | Jimmy White (ENG) | 6 | 3 | 0 | 3 | 6 | 10 | 14 | −4 | Advances into Group 7 |
| 6 | Mark Allen (NIR) | 6 | 1 | 0 | 5 | 2 | 8 | 16 | −8 | Eliminated from the competition |
| 7 | Gerard Greene (NIR) | 6 | 0 | 1 | 5 | 1 | 7 | 17 | −10 | Eliminated from the competition |

=== Group six league play-offs ===
Semi-finals; Best of 5 frames
1 | Mark Selby (ENG) | 3
4 | Ali Carter (ENG) | 2
2 | Neil Robertson (AUS) | 3
3 | Mark King (ENG) | 1

Final; Best of 5 frames
1 | Mark Selby (ENG) | 3
2 | Neil Robertson (AUS) | 1

== Group seven ==
Group seven matches were played on 12 and 13 May 2008. Mark King was the last player to qualify for the winners group.

=== Group seven league matches ===
- Neil Robertson 2–2 Mark King
- Ali Carter 1–3 Jimmy White
- Ian McCulloch 1–3 Fergal O'Brien
- Dave Harold 1–3 Neil Robertson
- Mark King 2–2 Ali Carter
- Jimmy White 1–3 Ian McCulloch
- Fergal O'Brien 3–1 Dave Harold
- Neil Robertson 3–1 Ali Carter
- Mark King 3–1 Jimmy White
- Ian McCulloch 1–3 Dave Harold
- Ali Carter 0–4 Dave Harold
- Fergal O'Brien 3–1 Jimmy White
- Neil Robertson 1–3 Fergal O'Brien
- Mark King 1–3 Ian McCulloch
- Jimmy White 2–2 Dave Harold
- Ali Carter 1–3 Fergal O'Brien
- Neil Robertson 3–1 Ian McCulloch
- Mark King 1–3 Dave Harold
- Mark King 2–2 Fergal O'Brien
- Ali Carter 4–0 Ian McCulloch
- Neil Robertson 2–2 Jimmy White

=== Group seven league table ===
| Pos | Player | Pld | W | D | L | Pts | FF | FA | FD | |
|---|---|---|---|---|---|---|---|---|---|---|
| 1 | Fergal O'Brien (IRL) | 6 | 5 | 1 | 0 | 11 | 17 | 7 | +10 | Qualification to Group 7 play-off |
| 2 | Neil Robertson (AUS) | 6 | 3 | 2 | 1 | 8 | 14 | 10 | +4 | Qualification to Group 7 play-off |
| 3 | Dave Harold (ENG) | 6 | 3 | 1 | 2 | 7 | 14 | 10 | +4 | Qualification to Group 7 play-off |
| 4 | Mark King (ENG) | 6 | 1 | 3 | 2 | 5 | 11 | 13 | −2 | Qualification to Group 7 play-off |
| 5 | Jimmy White (ENG) | 6 | 1 | 2 | 3 | 4 | 10 | 14 | −4 | Eliminated from the competition |
| 6 | Ian McCulloch (ENG) | 6 | 2 | 0 | 4 | 4 | 9 | 15 | −6 | Eliminated from the competition |
| 7 | Ali Carter (ENG) | 6 | 1 | 1 | 4 | 3 | 9 | 15 | −6 | Eliminated from the competition |

=== Group seven league play-offs ===
Semi-finals; Best of 5 frames
1 | Fergal O'Brien (IRL) | 0
4 | Mark King (ENG) | 3
2 | Neil Robertson (AUS) | 1
3 | Dave Harold (ENG) | 3

Final; Best of 5 frames
4 | Mark King (ENG) | 3
3 | Dave Harold (ENG) | 0

== Winners group ==
The matches of the winners group were played on 14 and 15 May 2008. Joe Perry has qualified to the 2008 Premier League.

=== Winners group matches ===
- Ryan Day 3–1 Ken Doherty
- Anthony Hamilton 1–3 Shaun Murphy
- Joe Perry 1–3 Mark Selby
- Mark King 1–3 Ryan Day
- Ken Doherty 4–0 Anthony Hamilton
- Shaun Murphy 4–0 Joe Perry
- Mark Selby 4–0 Mark King
- Ryan Day 1–3 Anthony Hamilton
- Ken Doherty 1–3 Shaun Murphy
- Joe Perry 2–2 Mark King
- Anthony Hamilton 1–3 Mark King
- Mark Selby 3–1 Shaun Murphy
- Ryan Day 3–1 Mark Selby
- Ken Doherty 0–4 Joe Perry
- Shaun Murphy 3–1 Mark King
- Anthony Hamilton 1–3 Mark Selby
- Ryan Day 2–2 Joe Perry
- Ken Doherty 2–2 Mark King
- Ken Doherty 3–1 Mark Selby
- Anthony Hamilton 2–2 Joe Perry
- Ryan Day 3–1 Shaun Murphy

=== Winners group table ===
| Pos | Player | Pld | W | D | L | Pts | FF | FA | FD | |
|---|---|---|---|---|---|---|---|---|---|---|
| 1 | Ryan Day (WAL) | 6 | 4 | 1 | 1 | 9 | 15 | 9 | +6 | Qualification to Winners' Group play-off |
| 2 | Mark Selby (ENG) | 6 | 4 | 0 | 2 | 8 | 15 | 9 | +6 | Qualification to Winners' Group play-off |
| 3 | Shaun Murphy (ENG) | 6 | 4 | 0 | 2 | 8 | 15 | 9 | +6 | Qualification to Winners' Group play-off |
| 4 | Joe Perry (ENG) | 6 | 1 | 3 | 2 | 5 | 11 | 13 | −2 | Qualification to Winners' Group play-off |
| 5 | Ken Doherty (IRL) | 6 | 2 | 1 | 3 | 5 | 11 | 13 | −2 | Eliminated from the competition |
| 6 | Mark King (ENG) | 6 | 1 | 2 | 3 | 4 | 9 | 15 | −6 | Eliminated from the competition |
| 7 | Anthony Hamilton (ENG) | 6 | 1 | 1 | 4 | 3 | 8 | 16 | −8 | Eliminated from the competition |

=== Winners group play-offs ===
Semi-finals; Best of 5 frames
1 | Ryan Day (WAL) | 1
4 | Joe Perry (ENG) | 3
2 | Mark Selby (ENG) | 3
3 | Shaun Murphy (ENG) | 2

Final; Best of 5 frames
4 | Joe Perry (ENG) | 3
2 | Mark Selby (ENG) | 1

== Century breaks ==
Total:76

- 143, 143, 129, 125, 122, 119, 113, 112, 107, 104, 104 – Ali Carter
- 143, 133, 120, 101 – Dave Harold
- 142, 140, 127, 116, 108, 103, 102, 102, 102, 101, 100 – Neil Robertson
- 137, 134, 122, 105, 102 – Ryan Day
- 129, 126, 113, 101, 101, 100 – Ken Doherty
- 129, 114, 107, 104, 100, 100 – Joe Perry
- 128, 128, 117, 112, 112, 105, 105 – Shaun Murphy
- 128, 128 – Stuart Bingham
- 126, 108, 107, 107, 107, 104, 103, 100 – Anthony Hamilton
- 125, 119 – Jamie Cope
- 125, 117 – Mark King
- 124, 112 – Fergal O'Brien
- 114 – Mark Williams
- 113 – Gerard Greene
- 112, 110, 105 – Jimmy White
- 109, 108, 100 – Mark Allen
- 103, 100 – Mark Selby

== Winnings ==
| No. | Player | 1 | 2 | 3 | 4 | 5 | 6 | 7 | W | TOTAL |
|---|---|---|---|---|---|---|---|---|---|---|
| 1 | Joe Perry (ENG) | 4,900 | 2,800 | | 1,200 | 6,200 | | | 14,000 | 29,100 |
| 2 | Ali Carter (ENG) | 2,600 | 5,000 | 5,300 | 4,900 | 1,000 | 2,900 | 900 | | 22,600 |
| 3 | Mark Selby (ENG) | | | 2,900 | | | 6,500 | | 9,200 | 18,600 |
| 4 | Mark King (ENG) | | | | 2,300 | 4,800 | 2,600 | 5,900 | 1,800 | 17,400 |
| 5 | Shaun Murphy (ENG) | | | 3,100 | 6,200 | | | | 6,600 | 15,900 |
| 6 | Ryan Day (WAL) | 6,100 | | | | | | | 6,300 | 12,400 |
| 7 | Ken Doherty (IRL) | 2,200 | 6,100 | | | | | | 2,200 | 10,500 |
| 8 | Neil Robertson (AUS) | | | | | 2,900 | 4,800 | 2,700 | | 10,400 |
| 9 | Anthony Hamilton (ENG) | | 2,300 | 6,100 | | | | | 1,600 | 10,000 |
| 10 | Mark Allen (NIR) | | | | 2,900 | 2,700 | 800 | | | 6,400 |
| 11 | Dave Harold (ENG) | | | | | | | 4,300 | | 4,300 |
| 12 | Fergal O'Brien (IRL) | | | | | | | 2,700 | | 2,700 |
| 13 | Mark Williams (WAL) | 1,200 | 1,000 | | | | | | | 2,200 |
| 14 | Jimmy White (ENG) | | | | | | 1,000 | 1,000 | | 2,000 |
| 15 | Stuart Bingham (ENG) | | | 900 | 1,000 | | | | | 1,900 |
| 16 | Joe Swail (NIR) | | 1,100 | 700 | | | | | | 1,800 |
| 17 | Matthew Stevens (WAL) | 1,000 | | | | | | | | 1,000 |
| = | Barry Hawkins (ENG) | 1,000 | | | | | | | | 1,000 |
| = | Nigel Bond (ENG) | | 1,000 | | | | | | | 1,000 |
| 20 | Ian McCulloch (ENG) | | | | | | | 900 | | 900 |
| 21 | Jamie Cope (ENG) | | | | 800 | | | | | 800 |
| = | Stephen Lee (ENG) | | | | | 800 | | | | 800 |
| 23 | Gerard Greene (NIR) | | | | | | 700 | | | 700 |
| 24 | Dominic Dale (WAL) | | | | | 600 | | | | 600 |
| = | Michael Holt (ENG) | | | 600 | | | | | | 600 |
| | Total prize money | 19,000 | 19,300 | 19,600 | 19,300 | 19,000 | 19,300 | 18,400 | 41,700 | 175,600 |

Green: Won the group. All prize money in GBP.
Source=Championship League Snooker by Matchroom Sport
