= Premier League Snooker =

British professional tournament (1987–2012)

Tournament information
- Country: England
- Established: 1987
- Organisation(s): Matchroom Sport
- Format: Non-ranking event
- Total prize fund: £210,000
- Final year: 2012
- Final champion: (England) Stuart Bingham

The Premier League Snooker was a professional non-ranking snooker tournament. It was held from 1987 until 2012. The tournament was played in a round-robin format over a number of weeks, normally from mid-September to early December, around the other World Snooker events in various locations.

== History ==
The event started in 1987 as the Matchroom League. The inaugural event was won by Steve Davis, who retained the title in the following three years. The matches were of eight frames and all frames were played out. Three points were awarded for a win and one point for a draw. The winner of the tournament was the player, who finished top of the league. In 1990 there was also a tournament in Europe, called International League. There had also been an earlier attempt to run a league-style format in snooker in 1984, which was called the Professional Snooker League. However it was beset by financial problems and was withdrawn after one season.

In 1992 a play-off system was added. The top four players after the leagues phase advanced to the semi-finals and a final was held to determine the winner. In 1993 the event was renamed the European League and in 1998 the Premier League Snooker. In 2005 Betfred took over the sponsorship of the tournament and introduced a 25-second shot clock and the matches in the league phase were shortened to six frames. In addition they offered £1000 for every century and frame won in the league phase. In the 2005/2006 season the event was moved from the second half of the calendar to the first, thus there were two events in 2005.

The event was dominated by Steve Davis, Stephen Hendry and Ronnie O'Sullivan, who between them won 20 of the 29 titles in the competition's history. O'Sullivan was the tournament's most successful player, winning ten titles in total, including five consecutively between 2005 and 2008. In 2013 the Premier League was discontinued and replaced by the Champion of Champions.

== Format of play ==
The league was an invitation-only event, contested mainly by players in the world's top 10. The combination of players was chosen though to have maximum televisual appeal, so it was usual for a mixture of high-ranked players, upcoming youngsters yet to reach the top 10, celebrated older players out of the top 10 and players with an appeal to international (non-UK) markets such as Asia or Australia to be selected. The players played each other once in a 8-frame match (10-frames in 1984). Unlike other snooker events, a draw was a possible result in the league. 2 points were awarded for a victory, and 1 for a draw. At the end of the leagues phase, the top 4 players in the league table went forward to the best of 9 semi-finals stage. The final was then played over the best of 13 frames. From 2008 Matchroom Sports started to hold a qualifying event, called Championship League. The winner of this competition was invited to the leagues phase of the Premier League Snooker.

The major difference from other tournaments was the presence of a shot clock. Each player has 25 seconds to strike the cue ball from the time the clock starts. This is determined by the timing official, and the clock normally starts when the balls have come to rest from the previous shot or after a potted colour is respotted. The penalty for exceeding the limit is 5 points and is classed as a miss. Each player is allowed five time-outs per match where the clock is stopped and they may have as long as they require to take their shot. A player is permitted no more than three time-outs per frame.

In 2011 the format was changed. All evenings in the league stage featured three matches: two semi-finals and a final. All matches were best of 5 frames, with no dead frames played, points were awarded for every frame won. Meaning that the maximum number of points a player can obtain was 24 and the minimum was 0. All frames were subject to a 20-second shot clock and the miss rule was changed; meaning that a player had three attempts to make legal contact with a ball or otherwise ball in hand was given to the incoming player anywhere on the table. The final frame of any match was played under shoot out rules. Each player appeared on 4 nights and was seeded to determine who they face. The play-offs were played to the rules used in previous editions. In 2012 the format of the event was changed back to the format used before 2011.

== Prize fund ==
The winner of the Premier League Snooker competition collected £50,000, while the runner-up would receive £25,000. Both of the losing semi-finalists also pocketed £12,500 each. Except for 2011, there was also a bonus fund of £1,000 per frame won and £1,000 per century break during the league phase. The £1,000 frame winning and £1,000 century bonus did not apply during the semi-finals or final. In 2011 the highest break of the night was awarded with £1,000.

== Winners ==
Year	Winner	Runner-up	Final score	Season
Professional Snooker League
1984	(England) John Virgo	(Northern Ireland) Dennis Taylor	Round-Robin	1983/84
Matchroom International League
1990	(England) Tony Meo	(England) Jimmy White	Round-Robin	1989/90
Matchroom League
1987	(England) Steve Davis	(England) Neal Foulds	Round-Robin	1986/87
1988	(England) Steve Davis	(Scotland) Stephen Hendry	Round-Robin	1987/88
1989	(England) Steve Davis	(England) John Parrott	Round-Robin	1988/89
1990	(England) Steve Davis	(Scotland) Stephen Hendry	Round-Robin	1989/90
1991	(Scotland) Stephen Hendry	(England) Steve Davis	Round-Robin	1990/91
1992	(Scotland) Stephen Hendry	(England) Steve Davis	9–2	1991/92
European League
1993	(England) Jimmy White	(Scotland) Alan McManus	10–7	1992/93
1994	(Scotland) Stephen Hendry	(England) John Parrott	10–7	1993/94
1995	(Scotland) Stephen Hendry	(Republic of Ireland) Ken Doherty	10–2	1994/95
1996	(Republic of Ireland) Ken Doherty	(England) Steve Davis	10–5	1995/96
1997	(England) Ronnie O'Sullivan	(Scotland) Stephen Hendry	10–8	1996/97
Premier League
1998	(Republic of Ireland) Ken Doherty	(England) Jimmy White	10–2	1997/98
1999	(Scotland) John Higgins	(England) Jimmy White	9–4	1998/99
2000	(Scotland) Stephen Hendry	(Wales) Mark Williams	9–5	1999/00
2001	(England) Ronnie O'Sullivan	(Scotland) Stephen Hendry	9–7	2000/01
2002	(England) Ronnie O'Sullivan	(Scotland) John Higgins	9–4	2001/02
2003	(Hong Kong) Marco Fu	(Wales) Mark Williams	9–5	2002/03
2004	(Scotland) Stephen Hendry	(Scotland) John Higgins	9–6	2003/04
2005 (May)	(England) Ronnie O'Sullivan	(Wales) Mark Williams	6–0	2004/05
2005 (Dec)	(England) Ronnie O'Sullivan	(Scotland) Stephen Hendry	6–0	2005/06
2006	(England) Ronnie O'Sullivan	(England) Jimmy White	7–0	2006/07
2007	(England) Ronnie O'Sullivan	(Scotland) John Higgins	7–4	2007/08
2008	(England) Ronnie O'Sullivan	(England) Mark Selby	7–2	2008/09
2009	(England) Shaun Murphy	(England) Ronnie O'Sullivan	7–3	2009/10
2010	(England) Ronnie O'Sullivan	(England) Shaun Murphy	7–1	2010/11
2011	(England) Ronnie O'Sullivan	(China) Ding Junhui	7–1	2011/12
2012	(England) Stuart Bingham	(England) Judd Trump	7–2	2012/13

== Media coverage ==
From 1987 to 2004, the Betfred Premier League matches were recorded and shown as-live, initially by ITV until the early 1990s when Sky Sports took over coverage. Since 2005 all matches have been televised live by Sky Sports, the introduction of live coverage coinciding with a relaunch of the league.
