= 2008 Premier League Snooker =

PartyPoker.com Premier League
Tournament information
- Dates: 11 September – 7 December 2008
- Country: United Kingdom
- Organisation: Matchroom Sport
- Format: Non-ranking event
- Total prize fund: £250,000
- Winner's share: £50,000
- Highest break: Ding Junhui (CHN) (139)

Final
- Champion: (England) Ronnie O'Sullivan
- Runner-up: (England) Mark Selby
- Score: 7–2

The 2008 PartyPoker.com Premier League was a professional non-ranking snooker tournament that was played from 11 September to 7 December 2008.

Ronnie O'Sullivan won in the final 7–2 against Mark Selby.

== Prize fund ==
The breakdown of prize money for this year is shown below:

- Winner: £50,000
- Runner-up: £25,000
- Semi-final: £12,500
- Frame-win: £1,000
- Century break: £1,000
- Total: £250,000

== League phase ==
Ranking		(England) SEL	(England) PER	(England) OSU	(Scotland) HEN	(China) DIN	(Scotland) HIG	(England) DAV	Frame W–L	Match W–D–L	Pld–Pts
1	Mark Selby	x	3	3	5	4	4	6	25–11	4–2–0	6–10
2	Joe Perry	3	x	4	5	2	4	4	22–14	4–1–1	6–9
3	Ronnie O'Sullivan	3	2	x	3	6	3	6	23–13	2–3–1	6–7
4	Stephen Hendry	1	1	3	x	3	4	5	17–19	2–2–2	6–6
5	Ding Junhui	2	4	0	3	x	3	4	16–20	2–2–2	6–6
6	John Higgins	2	2	3	2	3	x	3	15–21	0–3–3	6–3
7	Steve Davis	0	2	0	1	2	3	x	8–28	0–1–5	6–1

Top four qualified for the play–offs. If points were level then most frames won determined their positions. If two players had an identical record then the result in their match determined their positions. If that ended 3–3 then the player who got to four first was higher. (Breaks above 50 shown between (parentheses); century breaks are indicated with bold.)

- 11 September – Grimsby Auditorium, Grimsby, England
  - Mark Selby 4–2 Ding Junhui → 51–64, 15–105 (100), (86)–0, (80)–0, (73)–0, (104)–0
  - Ronnie O'Sullivan 3–3 John Higgins → (62) 63–70, 1–91 (83), (72) 98–0, (85)–0, 67–42, 0–(74)
- 18 September – The Anvil, Basingstoke, England
  - John Higgins 3–3 Ding Junhui → 43–64, 47–68, 46–82 (76), (57) 59–15, (50) 68–58 (50), (78)–4
  - Ronnie O'Sullivan 2–4 Joe Perry → 44–59, 6–105 (50,55), 0–(103), 63–47, (58) 90–0, 31–57
- 25 September – Assembly Rooms, Derby, England
  - Joe Perry 4–2 Steve Davis → 45–77, (80) 85–8, (67) 75–27, (55) 61–0, 63–45, 30–94 (65)
  - Mark Selby 5–1 Stephen Hendry → 82–4, 77–9, 76–66, (50) 79–8, 1–75 (52), 67–64
- 9 October – Malvern Theatres, Great Malvern, England
  - Ronnie O'Sullivan 6–0 Ding Junhui → 63–56, (134) 134–0, (65) 66–1, (53) 70–31, (71)–30, (126)–0
  - Mark Selby 6–0 Steve Davis → 68–36, (95)–3, 66–43, (80) 113–7, 73–49, (101)–0
- 23 October – Plymouth Pavilions, Plymouth, England
  - Ronnie O'Sullivan 6–0 Steve Davis → 103–7, (60) 97–25, (52) 71–38, (62) 113–0, 63–22, 93–0
  - Stephen Hendry 1–5 Joe Perry → 31–(75), 12–62, 72–9, 1–(108), 53–71(65), 10–75(66)
- 30 October – English Institute of Sport, Sheffield, England
  - Stephen Hendry 4–2 John Higgins → (76)–7, (65) 72–40, 24–61 (56), 65–12, 68–61 (56), 25–60 (52)
  - Ronnie O'Sullivan 3–3 Mark Selby → (75) 121–10, 60–56, 41–64, (64) 71–28, 5–98, 19–94 (94)
- 6 November – Newport Centre, Newport, Wales
  - Joe Perry 2–4 Ding Junhui → (50)–85 (70), 4–97, 0–82, (85)–5, 0–80, (90)–0
  - Steve Davis 1–5 Stephen Hendry → 37–54, 0–84 (78), 75–54, 48–75, 32–78 (72), 37–86 (86)
- 13 November – Dolphin Leisure Centre, Haywards Heath, England
  - Ding Junhui 4–2 Steve Davis → (139)–0, (72) 103–32, (78) 104–0, (56) 92–4, 1–74 (70), 18–69
  - Mark Selby 4–2 John Higgins → (102)–0, 37–82, (55) 72–46, (93) 94–32, 28–62 (60), (113) 126–0
- 20 November – Sands Centre, Carlisle, England
  - John Higgins 2–4 Joe Perry → 0–(72), 10–75, 36–81, 1–68, (120)–0, (76)–21
  - Ronnie O'Sullivan 3–3 Stephen Hendry → 53–60, 1–109 (108), (67) 77–17, 37–73 (72), (68) 94–36, 66–42
- 27 November – Glades Arena, Kidderminster, England
  - Mark Selby 3–3 Joe Perry → (63) 91–3, 59–49, 80–22, 6–(115), 2–57, 22–66 (51)
  - Stephen Hendry 3–3 Ding Junhui → 36–(85), (88)–1, 0–(113), (50) 69–12, 8–72, 69–13
  - John Higgins 3–3 Steve Davis → 18–68, 8–57, 66–8, (73)–16, (69) 70–29, 37–67

== Play-offs ==
6–7 December – Potters Leisure Resort, Hopton-on-Sea, England

Semi-finals; Best of 9 frames
1	(England) Mark Selby	5
4	(Scotland) Stephen Hendry	0
2	(England) Joe Perry	4
3	(England) Ronnie O'Sullivan	5

Final; Best of 13 frames
1	(England) Mark Selby	2
3	(England) Ronnie O'Sullivan	7

Semi-Final 1 – Mark Selby 5–0 Stephen Hendry 83–34, 110(110)–4, 133(128)–0, 115(115)–4, 77(77)–0
Semi-Final 2 – Joe Perry 4–5 Ronnie O'Sullivan 55–68, 93(85)–0, 20–93(79), 76(72)–8, 24–93, 95(95)–0, 6–69(52), 100(100)–4, 4–104(104)
Final – Mark Selby 2–7 Ronnie O'Sullivan 11–121(93), 8–82(62), 18–74, 14–84(84), 48–83(62), 61–58, 13–105(105), 84(84)–0, 20–74(74)

== Qualifiers ==
The qualification for this tournament, the Championship League was played in eight groups from 25 February to 15 May 2008.

== Century breaks ==
- 139, 113, 100 – Ding Junhui
- 134, 126, 105, 104 – Ronnie O'Sullivan
- 128, 120, 115, 110, 104, 102, 101 – Mark Selby
- 120 – John Higgins
- 115, 103, 101, 100 – Joe Perry
- 108 – Stephen Hendry
