= 2013 Masters (snooker) =

Professional non-ranking snooker tournament, Jan 2013

2013 Betfair Masters

Tournament information
- Dates: 13–20 January 2013
- Venue: Alexandra Palace
- City: London
- Country: England
- Organisation: World Snooker
- Format: Non-ranking event
- Total prize fund: £500,000
- Winner's share: £175,000
- Highest break: Mark Allen (NIR) (138)

Final
- Champion: Mark Selby (ENG)
- Runner-up: Neil Robertson (AUS)
- Score: 10–6

The 2013 Masters (officially the 2013 Betfair Masters) was a professional non-ranking snooker tournament held between 13 and 20 January 2013 at the Alexandra Palace in London, England. This was the first time that Betfair sponsored the event. The event was broadcast live on Eurosport and BBC.

Mark Selby won his third Masters title by defeating defending champion Neil Robertson 10–6 in the final. With this Selby became the sixth player to win the Masters more than two times after Cliff Thorburn, Stephen Hendry, Paul Hunter, Steve Davis and Ronnie O'Sullivan. Selby also became the first player to win back-to-back Triple Crown titles since Mark Williams 10 years before. This was Selby's 11th professional title.

== Field ==
Defending champion Neil Robertson was the number 1 seed. World Champion Ronnie O'Sullivan did not compete. The remaining places were allocated to players based on the latest world rankings (revision 3) except that Stephen Lee, ranked 9, did not play because he was suspended. As a consequence Mark Davis, ranked 17, was invited and seeded 16.

== Prize fund ==
The total prize money of £500,000 was unchanged from the previous year but the distribution was changed with the winner receiving £175,000, an increase of £25,000. The breakdown of prize money for this year is shown below:

- Winner: £175,000
- Runner-up: £85,000
- Semi-finals: £40,000
- Quarter-finals: £20,000
- Last 16: £9,000
- Highest break: £8,000
- Total: £500,000

== Main draw ==
Last 16; Best of 11 frames
1	Neil Robertson (AUS)	6
10	Ding Junhui (CHN)	5
8	Mark Allen (NIR)	6
16	Mark Davis (ENG)	2
5	Shaun Murphy (ENG)	6
11	Ricky Walden (ENG)	4
4	John Higgins (SCO)	6
14	Ali Carter (ENG)	3
3	Mark Selby (ENG)	6
9	Stuart Bingham (ENG)	5
6	Mark Williams (WAL)	6
13	Matthew Stevens (WAL)	4
7	Stephen Maguire (SCO)	5
12	Graeme Dott (SCO)	6
2	Judd Trump (ENG)	6
15	Barry Hawkins (ENG)	5

Quarter-finals; Best of 11 frames
1	(Australia) Neil Robertson	6
8	(Northern Ireland) Mark Allen	5
5	(England) Shaun Murphy	6
4	(Scotland) John Higgins	5
3	(England) Mark Selby	6
6	(Wales) Mark Williams	1
12	(Scotland) Graeme Dott	6
2	(England) Judd Trump	1

Semi-finals; Best of 11 frames
1	(Australia) Neil Robertson	6
5	(England) Shaun Murphy	2
3	(England) Mark Selby	6
12	(Scotland) Graeme Dott	5

Final; Best of 19 frames
1	(Australia) Neil Robertson	6
3	(England) Mark Selby	10

== Final ==
Final: Best of 19 frames. Referee: Terry Camilleri. Alexandra Palace, London, England, 20 January 2013
Neil Robertson (1); Australia	6–10	Mark Selby (3); England
Afternoon: 12–58, 1–73 (73), 23–102 (102), 83–1 (78), 1–84 (84), 45–69, 74–9 (63), 87–0 (72); Evening: 8–80 (67), 48–63, 0–72, 81–6 (74), 91–8 (83), 69–50, 27–58, 9–84
83	Highest break	102
0	Century breaks	1
5	50+ breaks	4

== Century breaks ==
Total: 20

- 138, 136 – Mark Allen
- 132, 127, 111, 105, 101, 100 – Neil Robertson
- 131, 110 – Stephen Maguire
- 130 – Shaun Murphy
- 127, 103 – Ding Junhui
- 117 – John Higgins
- 111, 111 – Graeme Dott
- 109 – Barry Hawkins
- 107, 105 – Judd Trump
- 102 – Mark Selby
