= Grimsby Auditorium =

Theatre in North East Lincolnshire, England

- Grimsby Auditorium from the outside
- Interactive map of Grimsby Auditorium
- Location: Grimsby, North East Lincolnshire, England
- Coordinates: 53.5686°N 0.1131°W
- Owner: North East Lincolnshire Council
- Capacity: 1,215 (all seated); 2,053 (standing)
- Type: Live entertainment
- Events: Music, pantomime, comedy, theatre

Construction
- Opened: 1995

Website
- grimsbyauditorium.org.uk

Grimsby Auditorium is a theatre situated on Cromwell Road, in Grimsby, North East Lincolnshire. With a seated audience capacity of 1,200 the Grimsby Auditorium is the largest professional theatre in Lincolnshire, and one of the larger theatres in the East of England. Built in 1995, it is today managed by Lincs Inspire on behalf of its owners North East Lincolnshire Council.

== Overview ==
Grimsby Auditorium was designed as a flexible, multi-purpose venue to host a variety of live events including concerts, theatre shows, social events, conferences and television broadcasts. The main auditorium houses retractable raked seating, which also permits the use of the auditorium as an arena style venue and sports hall, with different seating formations. Grimsby Auditorium has a maximum seating capacity of 1,215 patrons seated and rising to 2,053 standing, the actual number varies depending on the layout and use of the main auditorium.

The auditorium stages a professional pantomime once per year, featuring both celebrities and local talent. This was previously produced by UK Productions, Pelé Productions and currently Imagine Theatre. Recent pantomimes have included Peter Pan, Jack and the Beanstalk and Cinderella.

Notable musicians to have appeared at the auditorium include Deep Purple, Morrissey, Kasabian and The Stereophonics.

In 2020, it received a £233,000 grant from the UK government to help with mandatory closures associated with the COVID-19 pandemic.

== Technical ==
The Grimsby Auditorium is most commonly used as a traditional proscenium style theatre.

The apron is an area of stage that extends beyond the house curtain and is visible to the audience. The apron at Grimsby Auditorium measures 22 metres in width and 2.5 metres in depth. Extensions can also be constructed to extend the stage further into the Auditorium, a technique employed to create a thrust style stage or a catwalk for fashion shows.

The proscenium is the 'archway' that frames the front of the stage area. In more traditional theatres, the proscenium will be a built in feature of the theatre, however the Grimsby Auditorium proscenium is created using fabric curtains. Due to the design of the theatre, Grimsby Auditrium has a flexible proscenium, which can be set at a minimum of 11 metres in width, but can also be made wider depending on the size of the production being staged. The proscenium has a fixed height of 6.1 metres.

The stage is the actual performance area of a theatre. Including the apron, the Grimsby Auditorium stage measures a total depth of 11m, with a measurement of 8.5 metres from the line of the house curtain to the cyclorama or back wall. The width of the stage depends on the size of the production being staged as the curtains which form the proscenium and wings are flexible, meaning the stage can be made to appear wider or narrower.

The steel grid holding the lighting rig is suspended above the stage at a height of 8.1 metres. An orchestra pit can be created at floor level in various formations.

The removal of the stalls and circle seating can see capacity increased to a maximum of 2,053 people.
