= Billy Snaddon =

Scottish snooker player

Personal information
- Born: 7 July 1969 (age 57)

Sport
- Country: Scotland
- Sport: Snooker
- Professional: 1991–2004
- Highest ranking: 24 (2000/01)
- Best ranking finish: Runner-up (x1)

Billy Snaddon (born 7 July 1969) is a Scottish former professional snooker player. He reached the World Snooker Championship first round five times, but never progressed past this stage. He spent 5 seasons ranked among the game's top 32, peaking at No. 24 in 2000.

== Career ==
Snaddon began life as a footballer, but turned to snooker after a hip disease ended his football career, turning professional in 1991. He reached the last sixteen of seven ranking events before finally reaching a quarter-final, in the 1998 Irish Open.

He reached one ranking final in his thirteen-year career, in the 1999 Regal China International. A rank outsider in this tournament, he took out the top 16 players James Wattana, Ronnie O'Sullivan, Stephen Lee and Stephen Hendry en route to the final before losing 3–9 to World Champion John Higgins. Snaddon also reached the quarter-final of the Thailand Masters a year later.

In 2016, he won in both the team, and seniors individual, categories at the Blackball (pool) International World Championship.

== Performance and rankings timeline ==
Tournament	1991/ 92	1992/ 93	1993/ 94	1994/ 95	1995/ 96	1996/ 97	1997/ 98	1998/ 99	1999/ 00	2000/ 01	2001/ 02	2002/ 03	2003/ 04
Ranking	(Note: New players on the Main Tour do not have a ranking.)	74	59	36	33	35	32	32	24	24	26	40	67
Ranking tournaments
LG Cup (Note: The event was also called the Grand Prix (1991/1992–2000/2001))	LQ	3R	LQ	LQ	LQ	3R	3R	2R	1R	2R	1R	LQ	LQ
British Open	LQ	LQ	1R	2R	1R	1R	2R	1R	1R	2R	1R	LQ	LQ
UK Championship	2R	2R	LQ	1R	LQ	3R	1R	1R	1R	1R	1R	LQ	LQ
Welsh Open	LQ	2R	1R	LQ	3R	1R	1R	2R	1R	LQ	LQ	LQ	LQ
European Open (Note: The event was also called the Irish Open (1998/1999))	LQ	LQ	LQ	1R	LQ	LQ	NH	QF	Not Held		QF	LQ	LQ
Irish Masters	Non-Ranking Event											LQ	LQ
Players Championship (Note: The event was also called the International Open (1992/1993–1996/1997) and the Scottish Open (1997/1998–2002/2003))	NH	3R	LQ	2R	3R	1R	1R	1R	2R	2R	1R	LQ	LQ
World Championship	LQ	LQ	1R	1R	LQ	1R	LQ	LQ	1R	1R	LQ	LQ	LQ
Non-ranking tournaments
Masters Qualifying Event (Note: The event was also called the Benson and Hedges Satellite Championship (1991/1992) and the Benson and Hedges Championship (1992/1993–2002/2003))	LQ	1R	2R	2R	1R	1R	1R	1R	1R	3R	4R	3R	2R
The Masters	LQ	LQ	LQ	LQ	LQ	LQ	LQ	LQ	LQ	LQ	LQ	LQ	LQ
Former ranking tournaments
Classic	LQ	Tournament Not Held											
Strachan Open	2R	MR	NR	Tournament Not Held									
Asian Classic (Note: The event was also called the Dubai Classic (1991/92–1994/1995) and Thailand Classic (1995/1996))	LQ	1R	LQ	LQ	LQ	LQ	Tournament Not Held						
German Open	Tournament Not Held				1R	LQ	1R	Tournament Not Held					
Malta Grand Prix	Not Held			Non-Ranking Event					1R	NR	Not Held		
China Open (Note: The event was also called the China International (1997/1998–1998/1999))	Tournament Not Held						NR	F	LQ	1R	LQ	Not Held	
Thailand Masters (Note: The event was also called the Asian Open (1991/1992–1992/1993) and the Thailand Open (1993/1994–1996/1997))	LQ	LQ	LQ	LQ	1R	LQ	LQ	1R	QF	LQ	LQ	NR	NH
Former non-ranking tournaments
King's Cup	NH	A	A	W	Tournament Not Held								
Poland Masters	Tournament Not Held				QF	Tournament Not Held							
Scottish Masters	A	A	1R	QF	LQ	A	LQ	LQ	LQ	LQ	A	A	NH

Performance Table Legend
LQ	lost in the qualifying draw	#R	lost in the early rounds of the tournament (WR = Wildcard round, RR = Round robin)	QF	lost in the quarter-finals
SF	lost in the semi-finals	F	lost in the final	W	won the tournament
DNQ	did not qualify for the tournament	A	did not participate in the tournament	WD	withdrew from the tournament

NH / Not Held	means an event was not held.
NR / Non-Ranking Event	means an event is/was no longer a ranking event.
R / Ranking Event	means an event is/was a ranking event.

== Career finals ==
=== Ranking finals: 1 ===
Outcome	No.	Year	Championship	Opponent in the final	Score
Runner-up	1.	1999	China International	(Scotland) John Higgins	3–9

=== Non-ranking finals: 1 (1 title) ===
Outcome	No.	Year	Championship	Opponent in the final	Score
Winner	1.	1994	King's Cup	(Thailand) Noppadon Noppachorn	8–4
