= Mark Davis (snooker player) =

English professional snooker player (born 1972)

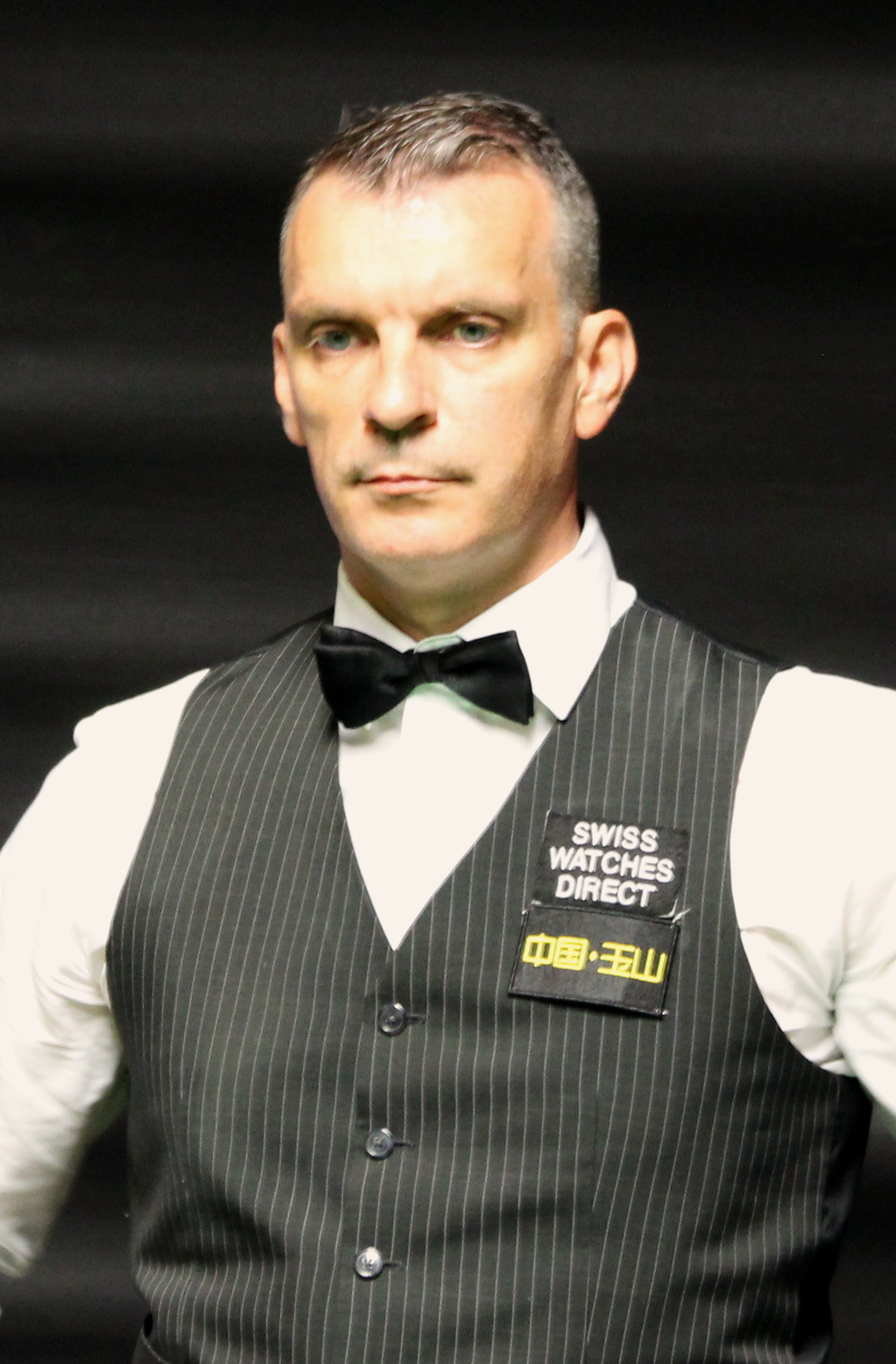
- Davis at the 2016 Paul Hunter Classic

Personal information
- Nickname: The Battler from Hastings
- Born: 12 August 1972 (age 54) St Leonards, Sussex, England

Sport
- Country: England
- Sport: Snooker
- Professional: 1991–2026
- Highest ranking: 12 (June 2013 and March–May 2014)
- Maximum breaks: 2
- Century breaks: 296
- Best ranking finish: Runner-up (2018 English Open)

Mark Davis (born 12 August 1972) is an English former professional snooker player from St Leonards in Sussex. He became professional in 1991, and for many years was considered something of a journeyman; however, he vastly improved his game in the late 2000s, and as a result in 2012 made his debut in the top 16. The highlights of his career so far have been winning the Benson & Hedges Championship in 2002 (earning him an appearance at the Masters), and the six-red snooker world championships three times (in 2009, 2012 and 2013). Davis reached his first ranking event final in 2018, losing to Stuart Bingham in the final of the English Open.

== Career ==
Davis made his debut in the main draw of the World Championship in 1994, losing in the first round to Terry Griffiths. In the following year he won his first match at the Crucible, beating Ken Doherty in the first round before being knocked out by Peter Ebdon in the second. Davis came close to losing his Main Tour status in the late 1990s, but recovered in the early 2000s to return to the top 48. Reaching the quarter-finals of the 2001 Regal Scottish tournament, his second career quarter-final, was the main catalyst for this. His success in reaching the 2008 World Championship came after two poor seasons, leaving him at No. 58 in the rankings. He opened the 2008/2009 season strongly by qualifying for the Northern Ireland Trophy and defeating local hope Joe Swail 5–4 in the first round, before beating Ding Junhui 5–4 in the last 32 in one of the best wins of his career. He was beaten 5–2 in the last 16 by Ali Carter. He followed this up by also qualifying for the Bahrain and UK Championships, though in the latter he was forced to pull out early in his last-32 match against Joe Perry, due to a stomach upset. He exceeded his 2007/2008 ranking points total after only five of the eight events of the 2008/2009 season. Davis won the Six-Red World Championship in 2009. In 2010, he reached the second round of the World Championship for the first time in 15 years by defeating sixth seed Ryan Day.

He also qualified for the 2010 Shanghai Masters event where he reached the last-eight beating Marco Fu and Stephen Maguire on the way before surrendering a 4–1 lead against Jamie Burnett and going out 5–4. However, his strong performances continued and took him to a career-high ranking of 18.

=== 2011/2012 season ===
Davis qualified for all but two of the ranking events in the 2011–12 season. He could only advance beyond the first round in the Australian Goldfields Open, where he lost 3–5 to Mark Selby in the last 16. Davis played in all 12 of the minor-ranking Players Tour Championship events during the season, reaching the final of Event 4, where he lost to Selby 0–4. This result was a large contributory factor to Davis finishing 16th on the PTC Order of Merit, inside the top 24 who made the Finals. At the Finals he beat Tom Ford, before losing to Stephen Maguire in the last 16. Davis' season came to an end when he suffered a heavy 2–10 loss, while feeling unwell, in the World Championship to Ali Carter. He finished the season ranked world number 19, with the elite top 16 places still eluding him.

=== 2012/2013 season ===
Davis started the 2012–13 season very successfully by reaching the first ranking event semi-final of his 21-year professional career at the Wuxi Classic. His run included wins over local favourite Ding Junhui, Jamie Burnett and Graeme Dott to set up a last 4 clash with Stuart Bingham who had won the previous week's Asian PTC. He trailed 0–4 at the mid-session interval, before coming back to play inspired snooker to lead 5–4 in the best of 11 frames match. However, Bingham then levelled the contest before compiling a 134 break to win the decider and end Davis' hopes of a first ranking final. At the Six-red World Championship he claimed the title by defeating Shaun Murphy 8–4 in the final. The winner's cheque of £40,000 is the biggest of his career to date. In the Australian Goldfields Open Davis saw off Jack Lisowski (5–2), home favourite Neil Robertson (5–1) and Martin Gould (5–2), to reach his second successive ranking semi-final. There he played close friend Barry Hawkins and was beaten 4–6.

At the UK Championship he beat Cao Yupeng 6–1 in the first round and led three-time champion John Higgins 5–2 in the second round, before withstanding a fightback from Higgins which included a 147, to win a decider. Davis saw off Matthew Stevens 6–4 in the quarter-finals, however his lack of experience on the big stage showed in his semi-final against Mark Selby, as he was beaten 4–9. Davis qualified for the 2013 Masters tournament thanks to his form earning him a place in the top 16. At his first outing in the tournament for 13 years he faced world number nine Mark Allen in the first round and lost 2–6. This began a dip in form for Davis as he lost in the qualifying round of the Welsh Open, the first round of both the World Open and Players Tour Championship Finals and in the second round of the China Open. However, he was still ranked 16 in the world at the cut-off for the 2013 World Championship, but was forced to qualify due to world number 28 and reigning champion Ronnie O'Sullivan deciding to defend his title after taking a year away from professional snooker. O'Sullivan was therefore the number one seed, meaning Davis dropped out of the top 16 who were guaranteed a spot in the event. Davis beat Liang Wenbo 10–6 in qualifying. He faced four-time champion John Higgins in the first round and claimed the best win of his career by winning 10–6 and played Stuart Bingham in the last 16. The match proved to be very tight, but from 10 to 10 Bingham pulled away to win 13–10 with Davis saying afterwards that he had done well to win 10 frames such was his disappointment at the way he had performed. However, he finished the season inside the top 16 for the very first time, at world number 13.

=== 2013/2014 season ===
Davis reached the quarter-finals of the Australian Goldfields Open but lost 5–3 to Mark Selby. At the 2013 Six-red World Championship he defended his title by defeating Neil Robertson 8–4 in the final. Only a week later he won his next tournament, the General Cup in Hong Kong, beating Robertson again in the final, this time by 7–2. A second ranking event quarter-final of the year came at the Shanghai Masters with comfortable 5–2 and 5–1 victories over Ali Carter and John Higgins. However, he then squandered a 4–2 lead over Xiao Guodong to be beaten 5–4. At the Masters he forced a decider in the first round against Mark Selby, having been 4–0 down but lost the 55-minute final frame to be defeated 6–5. In the quarter-finals of the German Masters, Davis lost in an extremely close match with Rod Lawler 5–4. Davis was an automatic qualifier for the World Championship for the first time in his career this season and said before the event that his minimum goal was to win through to the quarter-finals, but he was beaten 10–5 in the first round by Dominic Dale. Davis hung on to his top 16 ranking at the end of the season as he was the world number 16.

=== 2014/2015 season ===
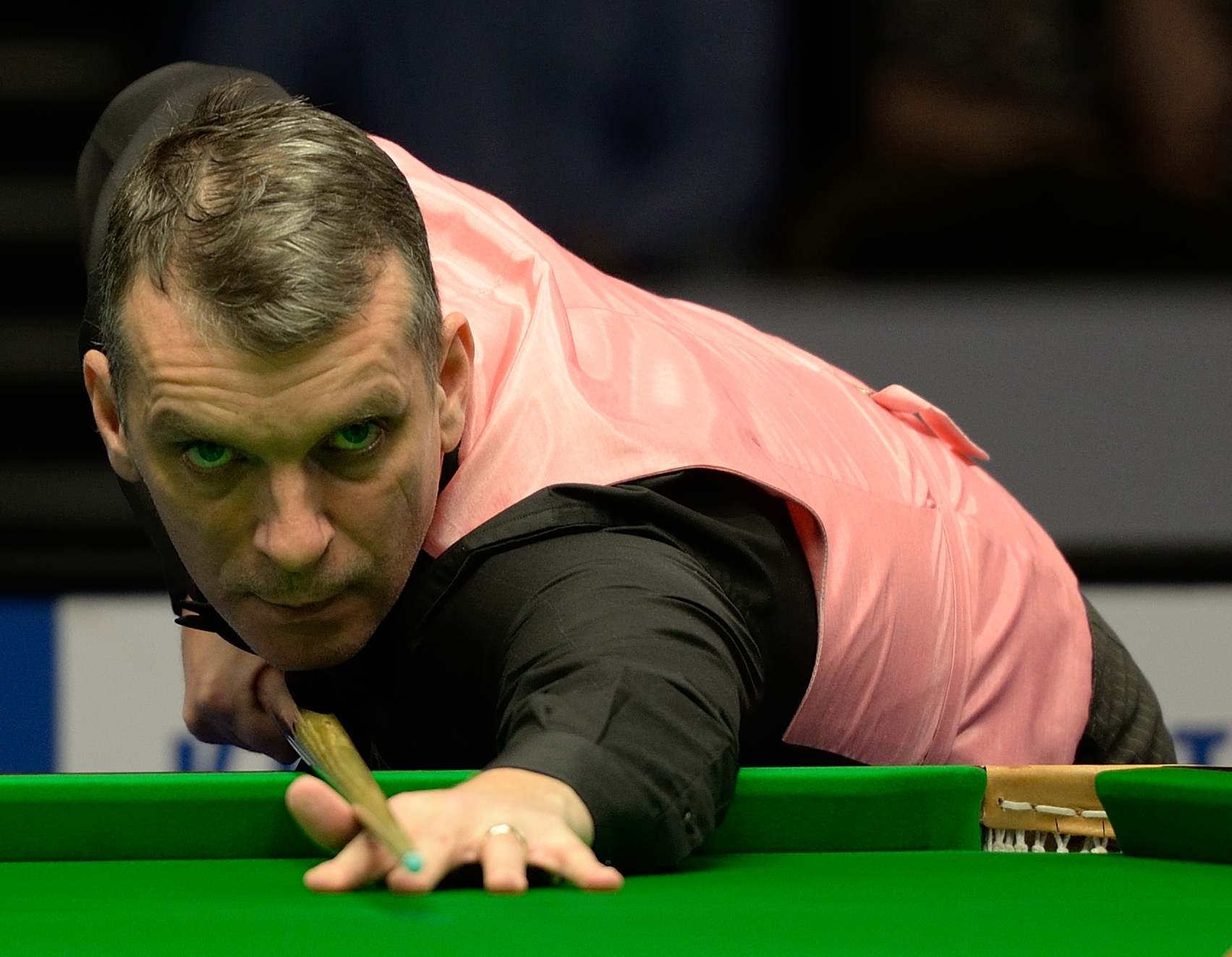
Mark Davis at the 2015 German Masters

Davis began his season at the Australian Goldfields Open, with his quarter-final match against Stuart Bingham containing ten breaks above 50 in the nine frames played, which Davis edged 5–4. In Davis' fourth ranking event semi-final he lost 6–2 to home favourite Neil Robertson. His second quarter-final in a ranking event of the year came at the UK Championship, but he was defeated 6–1 by Judd Trump. He followed that up with a semi-final showing at the minor-ranking Lisbon Open where he was whitewashed 4–0 by Stephen Maguire. Davis was beaten 3–2 by Stuart Bingham in the final of the non-ranking Championship League.

Davis' consistent season continued as he restricted John Higgins to just 38 points to thrash him 4–0 in reaching the last eight of the Indian Open, but he lost 4–2 against Thepchaiya Un-Nooh. Davis progressed through to his fourth ranking quarter-final of the season, the most in a single season of his career, at the PTC Grand Final by eliminating Neil Robertson 4–1. He was unable to play in the semi-finals however, as Bingham knocked him out 4–1. Davis earned a 4–0 early advantage over Ding Junhui at the World Championship and won the first session 5–3. However, he went on to be beaten 10–7.

=== 2015/2016 season ===
Davis' first quarter-final of the 2015–16 season came at the Shanghai Masters, courtesy of 5–1 and 5–3 wins over Michael White and Shaun Murphy, but he was beaten 5–1 by Mark Allen. He lost in the third round of the UK Championship 6–4 to Stephen Maguire. Davis claimed the World Seniors Championship, his first televised title in the UK, by seeing off Darren Morgan in the final. He failed to qualify for the World Championship for the first time since 2011 after losing 10–5 to Zhang Anda.

=== 2016/2017 season ===
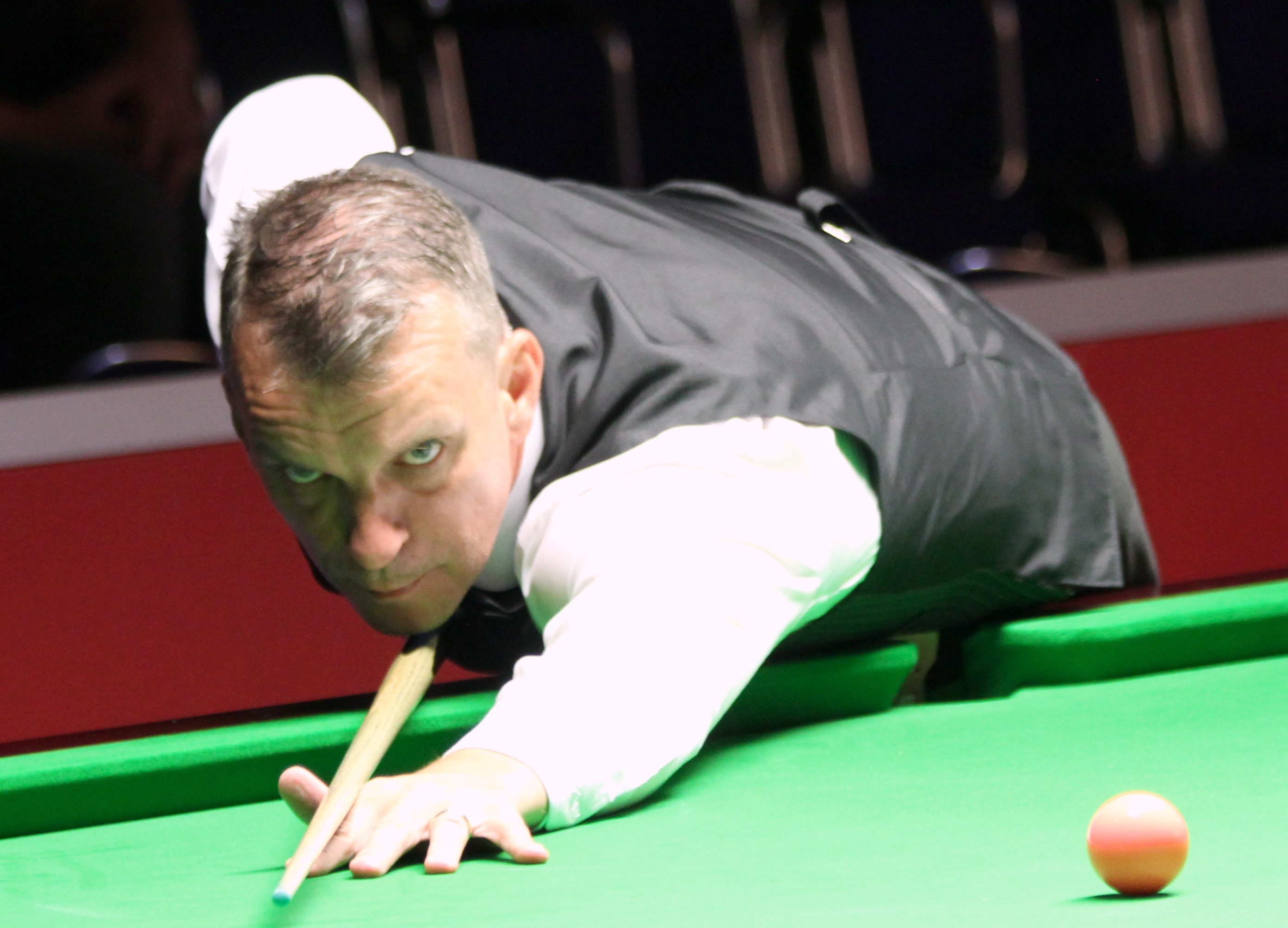
2016 Paul Hunter Classic

Davis lost 4–1 to Mark Selby in the quarter-finals of the Paul Hunter Classic. At the European Masters he beat Shaun Murphy 4–1 and Liang Wenbo 4–3 to reach another quarter-final and was defeated 4–1 by Ronnie O'Sullivan. His third quarter-final of the year came at the Scottish Open after he squeezed past Mark Williams 4–3, but he was heavily beaten 5–1 by Marco Fu. Davis knocked out Ronnie O'Sullivan 4–3 in the second round of the Welsh Open after being 3–0 down and then made the event's high break of 144 as he eliminated Fergal O'Brien 4–2. Davis lost 4–3 to Scott Donaldson in the fourth round. He could not reach the World Championship for the second year in a row after being defeated 10–7 in the qualifiers by Yan Bingtao.

== Personal life ==
Davis lives with his wife Claire, their son Jack and their daughter Milly.

== Performance and rankings timeline ==
Tournament	1991/ 92	1992/ 93	1993/ 94	1994/ 95	1995/ 96	1996/ 97	1997/ 98	1998/ 99	1999/ 00	2000/ 01	2001/ 02	2002/ 03	2003/ 04	2004/ 05	2005/ 06	2006/ 07	2007/ 08	2008/ 09	2009/ 10	2010/ 11	2011/ 12	2012/ 13	2013/ 14	2014/ 15	2015/ 16	2016/ 17	2017/ 18	2018/ 19	2019/ 20	2020/ 21	2021/ 22	2022/ 23	2023/ 24	2024/ 25	2025/ 26
Ranking (Note: It shows the ranking at the beginning of the season)	(Note: New players on the Main Tour don't have a ranking)	119	91	65	59	55	47	56	78	77	60	37	35	40	42	37	43	58	47	26	19	19	13	16	19	26	36	41	33	39	49	54	65	57	54
Ranking tournaments
Championship League	Tournament Not Held																Non-Ranking Event													2R	2R	RR	RR	RR	RR
Saudi Arabia Masters	Tournament Not Held																																	2R	2R
Wuhan Open	Tournament Not Held																																1R	1R	LQ
English Open	Tournament Not Held																									2R	2R	F	1R	3R	3R	1R	2R	1R	LQ
British Open	LQ	1R	LQ	LQ	LQ	2R	1R	LQ	3R	LQ	LQ	1R	3R	1R	Tournament Not Held																2R	LQ	LQ	2R	LQ
Xi'an Grand Prix	Tournament Not Held																																	1R	2R
Northern Ireland Open	Tournament Not Held																									2R	1R	3R	2R	2R	WD	LQ	1R	2R	2R
International Championship	Tournament Not Held																					2R	3R	2R	LQ	LQ	LQ	1R	2R	Not Held			2R	WD	LQ
UK Championship	LQ	2R	1R	LQ	LQ	LQ	LQ	LQ	LQ	LQ	3R	1R	1R	1R	3R	LQ	LQ	1R	LQ	1R	1R	SF	2R	QF	3R	2R	1R	2R	3R	1R	1R	LQ	LQ	LQ	LQ
Shoot Out	Tournament Not Held																			Non-Ranking Event						1R	SF	1R	2R	1R	1R	3R	QF	1R	1R
Scottish Open (Note: The event was called the International Open (1992/1993–1996/1997) and the Players Championship (2003/2004))	NH	LQ	LQ	2R	1R	LQ	1R	LQ	LQ	QF	LQ	LQ	1R	Tournament Not Held								MR	Not Held			QF	1R	2R	2R	1R	1R	LQ	1R	1R	1R
German Masters (Note: The event was called the German Open (1995/1996–1997/1998))	Tournament Not Held				LQ	QF	LQ	NR	Tournament Not Held											LQ	1R	LQ	QF	1R	LQ	LQ	2R	LQ	LQ	1R	LQ	LQ	2R	1R	LQ
World Grand Prix	Tournament Not Held																							NR	DNQ	DNQ	DNQ	2R	DNQ	DNQ	DNQ	DNQ	DNQ	DNQ	DNQ
Players Championship (Note: The event was called the Players Tour Championship Grand Final (2010/2011–2015/2016))	Tournament Not Held																			2R	2R	1R	1R	QF	1R	DNQ	DNQ	DNQ	DNQ	DNQ	DNQ	DNQ	DNQ	DNQ	DNQ
Welsh Open	LQ	LQ	LQ	LQ	LQ	LQ	1R	2R	LQ	LQ	LQ	LQ	1R	1R	2R	LQ	LQ	LQ	1R	LQ	1R	LQ	2R	2R	3R	4R	1R	1R	2R	2R	1R	LQ	LQ	1R	LQ
World Open (Note: The event was called the Grand Prix (1991/1992–2000/2001 and 2004/2005–2009/2010) and the LG Cup (2001/2002–2003/2004))	LQ	LQ	LQ	LQ	1R	1R	LQ	LQ	1R	LQ	2R	1R	1R	1R	LQ	LQ	RR	LQ	2R	1R	LQ	1R	2R	Not Held		1R	LQ	1R	2R	Not Held			LQ	1R	LQ
Tour Championship	Tournament Not Held																											DNQ	DNQ	DNQ	DNQ	DNQ	DNQ	DNQ	DNQ
World Championship	LQ	LQ	1R	2R	LQ	1R	LQ	LQ	LQ	1R	LQ	LQ	LQ	LQ	LQ	LQ	1R	LQ	2R	LQ	1R	2R	1R	1R	LQ	LQ	LQ	1R	LQ	1R	LQ	LQ	LQ	LQ	LQ
Non-ranking tournaments
Champion of Champions	Tournament Not Held																						1R	A	A	1R	A	A	A	A	A	A	A	A	A
The Masters	A	LQ	LQ	LQ	LQ	LQ	LQ	LQ	LQ	LQ	LQ	WR	LQ	A	A	A	LQ	A	A	A	A	1R	1R	A	A	A	A	A	A	A	A	A	A	A	A
Championship League	Tournament Not Held																A	A	A	RR	2R	RR	RR	F	RR	2R	A	RR	RR	A	A	A	A	A	A
World Seniors Championship	A	Tournament Not Held																		A	A	A	A	LQ	W	A	A	NH	A	A	A	QF	A	A	
Former ranking tournaments
Classic	1R	Tournament Not Held																																	
Strachan Open (Note: The event was called the Strachan Challenge (1992/1993–1993/1994))	1R	MR	NR	Tournament Not Held																															
Asian Classic (Note: The event was called the Asian Classic (1991/1992–1994/1995) and the Thailand Classic (1995/1996))	A	1R	2R	LQ	LQ	LQ	Tournament Not Held																												
Malta Grand Prix	Not Held			Non-Ranking Event					LQ	NR	Tournament Not Held																								
Thailand Masters (Note: The event was called the Asian Open (1991/1992–1992/1993) and the Thailand Open (1993/1994–1996/1997))	A	LQ	LQ	LQ	LQ	LQ	LQ	LQ	LQ	LQ	1R	NR	Not Held			NR	Tournament Not Held																		
Irish Masters	Non-Ranking Event											LQ	LQ	1R	NH	NR	Tournament Not Held																		
Northern Ireland Trophy	Tournament Not Held														NR	LQ	LQ	3R	Tournament Not Held																
Bahrain Championship	Tournament Not Held																	1R	Tournament Not Held																
Wuxi Classic (Note: The event was called the Jiangsu Classic (2008/2009–2009/2010))	Tournament Not Held																	Non-Ranking Event				SF	A	A	Tournament Not Held										
Australian Goldfields Open (Note: The event was called the Australian Open (1994/1995) and the Australian Masters (1995/1996))	Not Held			Non-Ranking		Tournament Not Held															2R	SF	QF	SF	1R	Tournament Not Held									
Shanghai Masters	Tournament Not Held																LQ	LQ	LQ	QF	1R	1R	QF	LQ	QF	LQ	1R	Non-Ranking		Not Held			Non-Ranking		
Paul Hunter Classic (Note: The event was called the Grand Prix Fürth (2004/2005) and the Fürth German Open (2005/2006–2006/2007))	Tournament Not Held													Pro-am Event						Minor-Ranking Event						QF	A	4R	NR	Tournament Not Held					
Indian Open	Tournament Not Held																						3R	QF	NH	2R	1R	QF	Tournament Not Held						
China Open (Note: The event was called the China International (1997/1998–1998/1999))	Tournament Not Held						NR	LQ	LQ	LQ	1R	Not Held		WR	LQ	LQ	LQ	LQ	WR	2R	LQ	2R	LQ	2R	1R	2R	1R	LQ	Tournament Not Held						
Riga Masters (Note: The event was called the Riga Open (2014/2015–2015/2016))	Tournament Not Held																							Minor-Rank		1R	3R	3R	LQ	Tournament Not Held					
China Championship	Tournament Not Held																									NR	3R	1R	LQ	Tournament Not Held					
WST Pro Series	Tournament Not Held																													2R	Tournament Not Held				
Turkish Masters	Tournament Not Held																														1R	Tournament Not Held			
Gibraltar Open	Tournament Not Held																								MR	4R	1R	2R	1R	1R	1R	Tournament Not Held			
WST Classic	Tournament Not Held																															2R	Not Held		
European Masters (Note: The event was called the European Open (1991/1992–1996/1997 and 2001/2002–2003/2004), the Irish Open (1998/1999) and the Malta Cup (2004/2005–2007/2008))	LQ	LQ	LQ	LQ	LQ	LQ	NH	LQ	Not Held		1R	1R	LQ	LQ	LQ	LQ	NR	Tournament Not Held								QF	3R	2R	LQ	3R	1R	LQ	1R	Not Held	
Former non-ranking tournaments
Malta Masters	Tournament Not Held				W	Tournament Not Held																													
Poland Masters	Tournament Not Held				RR	Tournament Not Held																													
Masters Qualifying Event (Note: The event was also called the Benson & Hedges Championship (1990/1991–2002/2003))	MR	2R	3R	4R	2R	4R	3R	2R	QF	SF	1R	W	SF	NH	A	A	2R	A	A	Tournament Not Held															
Brazil Masters	Tournament Not Held																				1R	Tournament Not Held													
World Grand Prix	Tournament Not Held																							QF	Ranking Event										
General Cup (Note: The event was called the General Cup International (2004/2005–2011/2012))	Tournament Not Held													A	Tournament Not Held				A	NH	A	RR	W	SF	RR	Tournament Not Held									
Shoot Out	Tournament Not Held																			2R	QF	2R	QF	1R	1R	Ranking Event									
Six-red World Championship (Note: The event was called the Six-red Snooker International (2008/2009) and the Six-red World Grand Prix (2009/2010))	Tournament Not Held																	2R	A	2R	NH	W	W	3R	2R	2R	RR	A	A	Not Held		LQ	Not Held		
Haining Open	Tournament Not Held																							Minor-Rank		A	A	1R	3R	NH	A	A	Not Held		

Performance Table Legend
LQ	lost in the qualifying draw	#R	lost in the early rounds of the tournament (WR = Wildcard round, RR = Round robin)	QF	lost in the quarter-finals
SF	lost in the semi-finals	F	lost in the final	W	won the tournament
DNQ	did not qualify for the tournament	A	did not participate in the tournament	WD	withdrew from the tournament
DQ	disqualified from the tournament				

NH / Not Held	event was not held.
NR / Non-Ranking Event	event is/was no longer a ranking event.
R / Ranking Event	event is/was a ranking event.
MR / Minor-Ranking Event	means an event is/was a minor-ranking event.
PA / Pro-am Event	means an event is/was a pro-am event.

== Career finals ==
=== Ranking finals: 1 ===
Outcome	No.	Year	Championship	Opponent in the final	Score
Runner-up	1.	2018	English Open	(England) Stuart Bingham	7–9

=== Minor-ranking finals: 1 ===
Outcome	No.	Year	Championship	Opponent in the final	Score
Runner-up	1.	2011	Paul Hunter Classic	(England) Mark Selby	0–4

=== Non-ranking finals: 9 (7 titles) ===
Outcome	No.	Year	Championship	Opponent in the final	Score
Winner	1.	1996	Malta Masters	(England) John Read	6–3
Winner	2.	2002	Merseyside Professional Championship	(Scotland) Stephen Maguire	5–2
Winner	3.	2002	Benson & Hedges Championship	(Cyprus) Mehmet Husnu	9–6
Runner-up	1.	2003	Merseyside Professional Championship	(Scotland) Stephen Maguire	1–5
Winner	4.	2009	Six-red World Championship	(Wales) Mark Williams	6–3
Winner	5.	2012	Six-red World Championship (2)	(England) Shaun Murphy	8–4
Winner	6.	2013	Six-red World Championship (3)	(Australia) Neil Robertson	8–4
Winner	7.	2013	General Cup	(Australia) Neil Robertson	7–2
Runner-up	2.	2015	Championship League	(England) Stuart Bingham	2–3

=== Pro–am finals: 3 (1 title) ===
Outcome	No.	Year	Championship	Opponent in the final	Score
Runner-up	1.	2004	Pontins Autumn Open	(England) Stuart Bingham	2–4
Winner	1.	2007	German Open	(England) Joe Perry	4–3
Runner-up	2.	2016	Vienna Snooker Open	(England) Peter Ebdon	1–5

=== Seniors finals: 1 (1 title) ===
Outcome	No.	Year	Championship	Opponent in the final	Score
Winner	1.	2016	World Seniors Championship	(Wales) Darren Morgan	2–1
