= 1994 King's Cup (snooker) =

Tournament information
- Dates: December 1994
- Venue: Thai/Japan Youth Centre
- City: Bangkok
- Country: Thailand
- Format: Non-ranking event
- Winner's share: £2,500
- Highest break: Suriya Suwannasing (THA), 120

Final
- Champion: Billy Snaddon (SCO)
- Runner-up: Noppadon Noppachorn (THA)
- Score: 8–4

The 1994 King's Cup was an invitational non-ranking snooker tournament held in Bangkok in December 1994. Billy Snaddon won the tournament by defeating Noppadon Noppachorn 8–4 in the final.

Round-robin groups were held to produce qualifiers for the knockout stage. Suriya Suwannasing made the highest break of the tournament, 120, during the group stages. Noppachorn led 3–1 in the final, before Snaddon won seven of the next eight frames for victory.

== Main draw ==
Players in bold denote match winners.

**Quarter-finals**; Best of 9 frames
**James Wattana (THA)**	**5**
C. W Tat (HKG)	4
**Billy Snaddon (SCO)**	**5**
Suriya Suwannasing (THA)	4
**Noppadon Noppachorn (THA)**	**5**
Martin Clark (ENG)	3
**Tai Pichit (THA)**	**5**
Mark Bennett (WAL)	2

**Semi-finals**; Best of 11 frames
James Wattana (THA)	1
**Billy Snaddon (SCO)**	**6**
**Noppadon Noppachorn (THA)**	**6**
Tai Pichit (THA)	3

**Finals**; Best of 15 frames
**Billy Snaddon (SCO)**	**8**
Noppadon Noppachorn (THA)	4
