= 1996 UK Championship =

Tournament information
- Dates: 15 November – 1 December 1996
- Venue: Preston Guild Hall
- City: Preston
- Country: England
- Organisation: WPBSA
- Format: Ranking event
- Winner's share: £70,000
- Highest break: Ken Doherty (IRL); Andy Hicks (ENG) (141)

Final
- Champion: Stephen Hendry (SCO)
- Runner-up: John Higgins (SCO)
- Score: 10–9

The 1996 UK Championship was a professional ranking snooker tournament that took place at the Guild Hall in Preston, England. The event started on 15 November 1996 and the televised stages were shown on BBC between 23 November and 1 December 1996.

Stephen Hendry won his third UK Championship in a row and fifth overall by defeating John Higgins 10–9 in the final. Hendry led 8–4, fell behind 8–9 after Higgins won 5 frames in a row, and then breaks of 82 and 77 in the last two frames was enough for Hendry to get the victory. Ken Doherty made the highest break of the tournament with 141.

Tony Drago made the fastest century break in a ranking event with a time of 3 minutes 31 seconds.

== Prize fund ==
The breakdown of prize money for this year is shown below:

- Winner £70,000
- Runner-up £37,000
- Semi-final: £18,500
- Highest break £5,000

== Main draw ==
=== Top half ===
Round 1 (Last 64); Best of 17 frames
(Scotland) Stephen Hendry	9
(Wales) Dominic Dale	6
(England) Neal Foulds	3
(England) Robert Milkins	9
(England) Dave Harold	6
(England) David Gray	9
(England) Anthony Hamilton	9
(Australia) Quinten Hann	3
(England) Willie Thorne	0
(England) Paul Hunter	9
(Thailand) James Wattana	9
(England) Jon Birch	3
(England) Mick Price	9
(England) Eddie Manning	6
(England) Ronnie O'Sullivan	7
(Northern Ireland) Terry Murphy	9
(Scotland) Alan McManus	9
(Wales) Ian Sargeant	6
(England) Gary Wilkinson	9
(England) Brian Morgan	2
(Wales) Darren Morgan	6
(Scotland) Billy Snaddon	9
(England) Rod Lawler	9
(England) Darren Clarke	5
(New Zealand) Dene O'Kane	8
(England) Joe Johnson	9
(England) Jimmy White	7
(Thailand) Tai Pichit	9
(England) Martin Clark	9
(England) Tony Jones	6
(England) John Parrott	9
(Thailand) Noppadon Noppachorn	4

Round 2 (Last 32); Best of 17 frames
(Scotland) Stephen Hendry	9
(England) Robert Milkins	5
(England) David Gray	8
(England) Anthony Hamilton	9
(England) Paul Hunter	9
(Thailand) James Wattana	5
(England) Mick Price	6
(Northern Ireland) Terry Murphy	9
(Scotland) Alan McManus	9
(England) Gary Wilkinson	7
(Scotland) Billy Snaddon	9
(England) Rod Lawler	7
(England) Joe Johnson	9
(Thailand) Tai Pichit	6
(England) Martin Clark	8
(England) John Parrott	9

Round 3 (Last 16); Best of 17 frames
(Scotland) Stephen Hendry	9
(England) Anthony Hamilton	1
(England) Paul Hunter	9
(Northern Ireland) Terry Murphy	7
(Scotland) Alan McManus	9
(Scotland) Billy Snaddon	5
(England) Joe Johnson	6
(England) John Parrott	9

Quarter-finals; Best of 17 frames
(Scotland) Stephen Hendry	9
(England) Paul Hunter	5
(Scotland) Alan McManus	9
(England) John Parrott	8

Semi-finals; Best of 17 frames
(Scotland) Stephen Hendry	9
(Scotland) Alan McManus	1

=== Bottom half ===
Round 1 (Last 64); Best of 17 frames
(England) Peter Ebdon	8
(England) Karl Broughton	9
(Scotland) Chris Small	9
(England) David Roe	4
(Canada) Alain Robidoux	9
(England) Jason Weston	7
(England) Stephen Lee	9
(Northern Ireland) Jason Prince	3
(England) Jason Ferguson	4
(Pakistan) Shokat Ali	9
(England) Steve Davis	9
(Scotland) Jamie Burnett	5
(Northern Ireland) Dennis Taylor	9
(England) Peter Lines	5
(Republic of Ireland) Ken Doherty	9
(England) Nick Pearce	2
(England) Nigel Bond	9
(England) Paul Wykes	0
(Northern Ireland) Joe Swail	9
(England) Mark King	8
(Wales) Mark Williams	9
(Wales) Tony Chappel	3
(England) David Finbow	5
(India) Yasin Merchant	9
(England) Andy Hicks	9
(England) Nick Terry	4
(Malta) Tony Drago	9
(Scotland) Alan Burnett	4
(England) Steve James	6
(Scotland) Marcus Campbell	9
(Scotland) John Higgins	9
(Wales) Steve Newbury	8

Round 2 (Last 32); Best of 17 frames
(England) Karl Broughton	9
(Scotland) Chris Small	6
(Canada) Alain Robidoux	9
(England) Stephen Lee	6
(Pakistan) Shokat Ali	7
(England) Steve Davis	9
(Northern Ireland) Dennis Taylor	4
(Republic of Ireland) Ken Doherty	9
(England) Nigel Bond	9
(Northern Ireland) Joe Swail	6
(Wales) Mark Williams	9
(India) Yasin Merchant	3
(England) Andy Hicks	5
(Malta) Tony Drago	9
(Scotland) Marcus Campbell	5
(Scotland) John Higgins	9

Round 3 (Last 16); Best of 17 frames
(England) Karl Broughton	8
(Canada) Alain Robidoux	9
(England) Steve Davis	5
(Republic of Ireland) Ken Doherty	9
(England) Nigel Bond	4
(Wales) Mark Williams	9
(Malta) Tony Drago	8
(Scotland) John Higgins	9

Quarter-finals; Best of 17 frames
(Canada) Alain Robidoux	3
(Republic of Ireland) Ken Doherty	9
(Wales) Mark Williams	6
(Scotland) John Higgins	9

Semi-finals; Best of 17 frames
(Republic of Ireland) Ken Doherty	3
(Scotland) John Higgins	9

== Final ==
Final: Best of 19 frames. Referee: Len Ganley; The Guild Hall, Preston, England, 1 December 1996.
Stephen Hendry; Scotland	10–9	John Higgins; Scotland
First session: 32–72 (69), 78–32, 105–14 (74), 16–65 (64), 80–28, 108–8 (102), 115–14 (115), 36–70, 4–93; Second session: 73–4 (73), 61–33, 108–0 (108), 59–66, 39–68, 32–96, 29–62 (54), 12–62, 82–0 (82), 77–0 (77)
115	Highest break	69
3	Century breaks	0
7	50+ breaks	3

== Century breaks ==
- 141, 140 – Ken Doherty
- 141, 133, 122, 106, 106, 104 – Andy Hicks
- 140, 115, 108, 108, 104, 103, 102 – Stephen Hendry
- 138 – Darren Clarke
- 136, 118, 105, 100, 100 – Paul Hunter
- 135, 132, 109 – James Wattana
- 135, 109 – John Higgins
- 135, 106 – Jason Weston
- 132, 113 – Nigel Bond
- 131 – Shokat Ali
- 130 – Tony Chappel
- 130 – Steve Newbury
- 124, 119, 106, 104 – Mark Williams
- 122, 103 – Tony Drago
- 122, 102 – Marcus Campbell
- 116 – Karl Broughton
- 115 – Tai Pichit
- 111, 100 – Anthony Hamilton
- 110 – Peter Ebdon
- 110 – Ronnie O'Sullivan
- 109, 107 – David Gray
- 109, 101 – John Parrott
- 109 – Stephen Lee
- 108 – Jonathan Birch
- 105 – Joe Johnson
- 104 – Gary Wilkinson
- 102, 102, 100 – Terry Murphy
- 102 – Tony Jones
- 102 – Billy Snaddon
- 101 – Quinten Hann
