= 1993 King's Cup (snooker) =

King's Cup
Tournament information
- Dates: 21–23 December 1993
- Venue: Channel 9 Auditorium
- City: Bangkok
- Country: Thailand
- Format: Non-ranking event
- Highest break: Suriya Suwannasing (THA), 110

Final
- Champion: James Wattana (THA)
- Runner-up: Darren Morgan (WAL)
- Score: 8–3

The 1993 King's Cup was an invitational non-ranking snooker tournament held in Bangkok in December 1993. James Wattana won the tournament by defeating Darren Morgan 8–3 in the final.

Round-robin groups were held to produce qualifiers for the knockout stage. Suriya Suwannasing made the highest break of the tournament, 110, during the group stages. Morgan led 2–0 and 3–1 in the final, before Wattana won seven consecutive frames for victory.

== Main draw ==
Players in bold denote match winners, and players with an asterisk were amateurs.

**Quarter-finals**; Best of 9 frames
**James Wattana (THA)**	**5**
Nut Wiengchai (THA)*	1
**Stephen Murphy (IRE)**	**5**
Mohammed Yousuf (PAK)*	4
**Darren Morgan (WAL)**	**5**
Prapruet Chaitanasakun (THA)*	2
**Jason Prince (NIR)**	**5**
Chuchart Trairatanapradit (THA)*	2

**Semi-finals**; Best of 11 frames
**James Wattana (THA)**	**6**
Stephen Murphy (IRE)	3
**Darren Morgan (WAL)**	**6**
Jason Prince (NIR)	2

**Finals**; Best of 15 frames
**James Wattana (THA)**	**8**
Darren Morgan (WAL)	3
