= 1992 King's Cup (snooker) =

King's Cup
Tournament information
- Dates: December 1992
- City: Bangkok
- Country: Thailand
- Format: Non-ranking event
- Winner's share: £2,500

Final
- Champion: Nigel Bond (ENG)
- Runner-up: James Wattana (THA)
- Score: 8–7

The 1992 King's Cup was an invitational non-ranking snooker tournament held in Bangkok in December 1992. Nigel Bond won the tournament by defeating James Wattana 8–7 in the final.

Sixteen players, a mixture of amateurs and professionals, were invited to compete. Four players were exempted to the quarter-final stage, where they each faced the winner of a qualifying group. In the final, Wattana took a 2–0 lead; Bond moved ahead for the first time at 5–4. Wattana was a frame from victory at 7–6, but Bond took the 14th frame and then recorded a break of 106 in the deciding frame to secure the title.

Going into the tournament, Bond had been on a poor run of form. After winning the championship, Bond commented that the tournament was "a nice break from the main [snooker] circuit and the pressure ...It was just the tonic I needed". He received £2,500 prize money.

== Main draw ==
Players in bold denote match winners.

**Quarter-finals**; Best of 9 frames
**Nigel Bond (ENG)**	**5**
Rom Surin (THA)	1
**Sammy Chong (MAS)**	**5**
Chris Carter (AUS)	4
**Yasin Merchant (IND)**	**5**
Tai Pichit (THA)	1
**James Wattana (THA)**	**5**
Anurat Vongchan (THA)	4

**Semi-finals**; Best of 11 frames
**Nigel Bond (ENG)**	**6**
Sammy Chong (MAS)	2
Yasin Merchant (IND)	2
**James Wattana (THA)**	**6**

**Finals**; Best of 15 frames
**Nigel Bond (ENG)**	**8**
James Wattana (THA)	7
