= 1996 Poland Masters =

Invitational snooker tournament

Tournament information
- Dates: 28–31 May 1996
- Venue: Atelier Snooker Club
- City: Warsaw
- Country: Poland
- Organisation: WPBSA
- Format: Non-ranking event
- Total prize fund: £15,000
- Winner's share: £4,000
- Highest break: Billy Snaddon (SCO) (127)

Final
- Champion: Gerard Greene (NIR)
- Runner-up: Patrick Wallace (NIR)
- Score: 6–5

The 1996 Poland Masters was a professional non-ranking snooker tournament, which took place between 28 and 31 May 1996 at the Atelier Snooker Club in Warsaw, Poland. Gerard Greene won the tournament defeating Patrick Wallace 6–5 in the final.

== Results ==
=== Group stage ===
Players in bold progressed to knockout stage

Group 1

	Played	Won	Lost
(Thailand) **Noppadon Noppachorn**	3	3	0
(England) **Nick Dyson**	3	2	1
(England) Mark Davis	3	1	2
(Poland) Maksymillian Janicki	3	0	3

Group 2

	Played	Won	Lost
(Pakistan) **Shokat Ali**	3	3	0
(Northern Ireland) **Gerard Greene**	3	2	1
(Finland) Risto Vayrynen	3	1	2
(Poland) Kuba Sawicki	3	0	3

Group 3

	Played	Won	Lost
(Wales) **Wayne Jones**	3	3	0
(Northern Ireland) **Patrick Wallace**	3	2	1
(Malta) Ray Demanuele	3	1	2
(Poland) Thomasz Koscielak	3	0	3

Group 4

	Played	Won	Lost
(England) **Leigh Griffin**	2	2	0
(Scotland) **Billy Snaddon**	2	1	1
(Poland) Krzysztof Bogucki	2	0	2

=== Knockout stage ===
**Quarter-final**; Best of 7 frames
(Thailand) Noppadon Noppachorn	2
(Northern Ireland) **Gerard Greene**	**4**
(Pakistan) Shokat Ali	2
(England) **Nick Dyson**	**4**
(Wales) **Wayne Jones**	**4**
(Scotland) Billy Snaddon	3
(England) Leigh Griffin	0
(Northern Ireland) **Patrick Wallace**	**4**

**Semi-final**; Best of 9 frames
(Northern Ireland) **Gerard Greene**	**5**
(England) Nick Dyson	4
(Wales) Wayne Jones	4
(Northern Ireland) **Patrick Wallace**	**5**

**Final**; Best of 11 frames
(Northern Ireland) **Gerard Greene**	**6**
(Northern Ireland) Patrick Wallace	5
