= 1996 Pakistan Masters =

Invitational snooker tournament

Tournament information
- Country: Pakistan
- Format: Non-ranking event
- Winner's share: £4,000

Final
- Champion: Noppadon Noppachorn (THA)
- Runner-up: Brian Morgan (ENG)
- Score: 7–5

The 1996 Pakistan Masters was an invitational non-ranking snooker tournament held in Karachi, Pakistan, from 23 to 26 April 1996. Noppadon Noppachorn won the tournament defeating Brian Morgan 7–5 in the final.

== Results ==
Last 16; Best of 7 frames
(Thailand) Noppadon Noppachorn	4
(Pakistan) Shokat Ali	0
(Belgium) Steve Lemmens	4
(Pakistan) Muhammad Yousaf	0
(Republic of Ireland) Fergal O'Brien	4
(Malaysia) Sammy Chong	0
(England) Gary Ponting	4
(Afghanistan) Saleh Mohammad	1
(England) Brian Morgan	4
(Pakistan) Aneel Bherwani	0
(Scotland) Marcus Campbell	4
(Thailand) Phaitoon Phonbun	2
(China) Guo Hua	4
(Pakistan) Firhan Mirza	0
(Thailand) Tai Pichit	4
(Thailand) Suriya Suwannasingh	1

Quarter-finals; Best of 9 frames
(Thailand) Noppadon Noppachorn	5
(Belgium) Steve Lemmens	3
(Republic of Ireland) Fergal O'Brien	5
(England) Gary Ponting	2
(England) Brian Morgan	5
(Scotland) Marcus Campbell	2
(China) Guo Hua	5
(Thailand) Tai Pichit	1

Semi-finals; Best of 11 frames
(Thailand) Noppadon Noppachorn	6
(Republic of Ireland) Fergal O'Brien	3
(England) Brian Morgan	6
(China) Guo Hua	3

Final; Best of 13 frames
(Thailand) Noppadon Noppachorn	7
(England) Brian Morgan	5
