= King's Cup (snooker) =

Tournament information
- Location: Bangkok
- Country: Thailand
- Established: 1989
- Organisation(s): WPBSA
- Format: Invitational event
- Final year: 1994
- Final champion: (Scotland) Billy Snaddon

The King's Cup was a series of invitational snooker tournaments staged in Bangkok, Thailand between 1989 and 1994, and was an event made for television in Thailand and held in the studios of their Channel 9 station just before Christmas. The tournament invited sixteen players, with a majority being Asian, and divided them into four groups of three. Four players were exempted until the quarter-finals, at which point they joined the group winners.

== Winners ==
Year	Winner	Runner-up	Final score	Season
1989	(Thailand) Rom Surin	(Thailand) Sammy Chong	7–6	1989/90
1990	(Northern Ireland) Joe Swail	(Thailand) James Wattana	8–4	1990/91
1992	(England) Nigel Bond	(Thailand) James Wattana	8–7	1992/93
1993	(Thailand) James Wattana	(Wales) Darren Morgan	8–3	1993/94
1994	(Scotland) Billy Snaddon	(Thailand) Noppadon Noppachorn	8–4	1994/95
