= 1996 Thailand Open =

Thailand Open
Tournament information
- Dates: 11–17 March 1996
- Venue: Montien Riverside Hotel
- City: Bangkok
- Country: Thailand
- Organisation: WPBSA
- Format: Ranking event
- Total prize fund: £230,000
- Winner's share: £40,000
- Highest break: Alan McManus (SCO) (139)

Final
- Champion: Alan McManus (SCO)
- Runner-up: Ken Doherty (IRL)
- Score: 9–8

The 1996 Singha Thailand Open was a professional ranking snooker tournament that took place between 11 and 17 March 1996 at the Montien Riverside Hotel in Bangkok, Thailand.

Alan McManus won the tournament, defeating Ken Doherty 9–8 in the final. The defending champion, James Wattana, was eliminated by McManus in the quarter-final.

== Wildcard round ==
Match		Score	
WC1	Barry Pinches (ENG)	5–1	Thomas Ang Chick Hong (MAS)
WC2	Paul Hunter (ENG)	5–0	Sakchai Sim Ngam (THA)
WC3	Graeme Dott (SCO)	5–3	Phaitoon Phonbun (THA)

== Main draw ==
Last 32; Best of 9 frames
(Thailand) James Wattana	5
(England) Steve James	3
(England) Willie Thorne	5
(Malta) Tony Drago	2
(Canada) Alain Robidoux	5
(England) Nigel Bond	4
(Scotland) Alan McManus	5
(England) Neal Foulds	2
(England) Jimmy White	5
(Scotland) Jamie Burnett	1
(England) Peter Ebdon	5
(England) Gary Ponting	0
(Scotland) John Higgins	5
(Scotland) Graeme Dott	3
(England) Ronnie O'Sullivan	5
(England) Barry Pinches	2
(England) Steve Davis	5
(England) Stephen Lee	3
(Republic of Ireland) Ken Doherty	5
(England) Tony Knowles	1
(England) Jamie Woodman	5
(Wales) Terry Griffiths	2
(England) Anthony Hamilton	5
(Wales) Darren Morgan	4
(England) John Parrott	5
(England) Paul Hunter	4
(England) David Roe	5
(Scotland) Billy Snaddon	0
(Northern Ireland) Joe Swail	5
(England) Dave Harold	4
(Scotland) Stephen Hendry	5
(Northern Ireland) Terry Murphy	4

Last 16; Best of 9 frames
(Thailand) James Wattana	5
(England) Willie Thorne	0
(Canada) Alain Robidoux	4
(Scotland) Alan McManus	5
(England) Jimmy White	3
(England) Peter Ebdon	5
(Scotland) John Higgins	5
(England) Ronnie O'Sullivan	3
(England) Steve Davis	2
(Republic of Ireland) Ken Doherty	5
(England) Jamie Woodman	5
(England) Anthony Hamilton	4
(England) John Parrott	5
(England) David Roe	4
(Northern Ireland) Joe Swail	2
(Scotland) Stephen Hendry	5

Quarter-finals; Best of 9 frames
(Thailand) James Wattana	4
(Scotland) Alan McManus	5
(England) Peter Ebdon	5
(Scotland) John Higgins	0
(Republic of Ireland) Ken Doherty	5
(England) Jamie Woodman	1
(England) John Parrott	1
(Scotland) Stephen Hendry	5

Semi-finals; Best of 11 frames
(Scotland) Alan McManus	6
(England) Peter Ebdon	5
(Republic of Ireland) Ken Doherty	6
(Scotland) Stephen Hendry	3

Final; Best of 17 frames
(Scotland) Alan McManus	9
(Republic of Ireland) Ken Doherty	8
