= 1986 Thailand Masters =

Thailand Masters
Tournament information
- Dates: August 1986
- Venue: Chiang Mai Plaza Hotel
- City: Bangkok
- Country: Thailand
- Organisation: WPBSA
- Format: Non-ranking event

Final
- Champion: (Thailand) James Wattana
- Runner-up: (Wales) Terry Griffiths
- Score: 2–1

The 1986 Camus Thailand Masters was a professional non-ranking snooker tournament held in August 1986 in Bangkok, Thailand.

16 year-old local favourite James Wattana an amateur invite won the tournament, defeating Terry Griffiths 2–1 in the final.

== Main draw ==
Quarter-finals; Best of 3 frames
(Thailand) James Wattana | 2
(Northern Ireland) Dennis Taylor | 1
(England) Steve Davis | 2
(Thailand) Sakchai Sim Ngam | 1
(Wales) Terry Griffiths | 2
(Thailand) Patipat Wattanaporn | 0

Semi-finals; Best of 3 frames
(Thailand) James Wattana | 2
(England) Steve Davis | 1
(Wales) Terry Griffiths | 2
(Thailand) Sakchai Sim Ngam | 0

Final; Best of 3 frames
(Thailand) James Wattana | 2
(Wales) Terry Griffiths | 1
