= 2000 Thailand Masters =

Thailand Masters
Tournament information
- Dates: 3–11 March 2000
- Venue: Riverside Montien Hotel
- City: Bangkok
- Country: Thailand
- Organisation: WPBSA
- Format: Ranking event
- Winner's share: £44,000

Final
- Champion: Mark Williams (WAL)
- Runner-up: Stephen Hendry (SCO)
- Score: 9–5

The 2000 Thailand Masters was a professional ranking snooker tournament that took place between 3–11 March 2000 at the Riverside Montien Hotel in Bangkok, Thailand.

Mark Williams retained the title by winning in the final 9–5 against Stephen Hendry.

== Main draw ==
Last 32; Best of 9 frames
(Wales) Mark Williams	5
(Northern Ireland) Terry Murphy	4
(England) Peter Ebdon	2
(England) Joe Perry	5
(England) Paul Hunter	5
(Scotland) Martin Dziewialtowski	3
(England) Stephen Lee	5
(England) Dave Harold	3
(Scotland) Alan McManus	4
(Wales) Anthony Davies	5
(England) Steve Davis	1
(Wales) Dominic Dale	5
(England) Mark King	5
(Scotland) Chris Small	2
(England) Ronnie O'Sullivan	5
(Northern Ireland) Joe Swail	3
(Scotland) John Higgins	3
(Scotland) Billy Snaddon	5
(England) Jimmy White	5
(England) David Roe	2
(Republic of Ireland) Fergal O'Brien	2
(Scotland) John Lardner	5
(Republic of Ireland) Ken Doherty	5
(Scotland) Hugh Abernethy	2
(England) John Parrott	3
(England) Nigel Bond	5
(Wales) Matthew Stevens	5
(England) Mike Dunn	1
(England) Anthony Hamilton	5
(Republic of Ireland) Michael Judge	3
(Scotland) Stephen Hendry	5
(England) Andy Hicks	0

Last 16; Best of 9 frames
(Wales) Mark Williams	5
(England) Joe Perry	3
(England) Paul Hunter	0
(England) Stephen Lee	5
(Wales) Anthony Davies	4
(Wales) Dominic Dale	5
(England) Mark King	5
(England) Ronnie O'Sullivan	2
(Scotland) Billy Snaddon	5
(England) Jimmy White	3
(Scotland) John Lardner	3
(Republic of Ireland) Ken Doherty	5
(England) Nigel Bond	4
(Wales) Matthew Stevens	5
(England) Anthony Hamilton	4
(Scotland) Stephen Hendry	5

Quarter-finals; Best of 9 frames
(Wales) Mark Williams	5
(England) Stephen Lee	3
(Wales) Dominic Dale	5
(England) Mark King	2
(Scotland) Billy Snaddon	3
(Republic of Ireland) Ken Doherty	5
(Wales) Matthew Stevens	1
(Scotland) Stephen Hendry	5

Semi-finals; Best of 9 frames
(Wales) Mark Williams	5
(Wales) Dominic Dale	1
(Republic of Ireland) Ken Doherty	3
(Scotland) Stephen Hendry	5

Final; Best of 17 frames
(Wales) Mark Williams	9
(Scotland) Stephen Hendry	5
