= 2001 European Open (snooker) =

Tournament information
- Dates: 23 November – 1 December 2001
- Venue: Mediterranean Conference Centre
- City: Valletta
- Country: Malta
- Organisation: WPBSA
- Format: Ranking event
- Total prize fund: £250,000
- Winner's share: £44,000

Final
- Champion: Stephen Hendry (SCO)
- Runner-up: Joe Perry (ENG)
- Score: 9–2

The 2001 European Open was a professional snooker tournament and the third of nine WPBSA ranking events in the 2001/2002 season, following the LG Cup and preceding the UK Championship. It was held from 23 November to 1 December 2001 at the Mediterranean Conference Centre in Valletta, Malta – the same place as the 1997 edition of the tournament. Stephen Hendry captured his 33rd ranking title by defeating Joe Perry 9–2 in the final. This was Hendry's third European Open title, equaling John Parrott as the most successful player in the history of the tournament. Perry reached his first ranking final, but he would have to wait another 13 years for a second which would come at the 2014 Wuxi Classic.

== Tournament summary ==
World Champion Ronnie O'Sullivan was the number 1 seed. The remaining places were allocated to players based on the world rankings.

== Main draw ==
Players in bold denote match winners.

Last 32; Best of 9 frames
1	(England) **Ronnie O'Sullivan**	**5**
(Scotland) Stephen Maguire	3
15	(England) Dave Harold	4
(Thailand) **James Wattana**	**5**
14	(Scotland) **Graeme Dott**	**5**
(England) Robert Milkins	0
5	(Scotland) **Stephen Hendry**	**5**
(England) Ian McCulloch	1
8	(England) **Stephen Lee**	**5**
(England) Alfie Burden	4
13	(England) Mark King	4
(Republic of Ireland) **Michael Judge**	**5**
12	(Scotland) **Alan McManus**	**5**
(England) Craig Butler	0
4	(Republic of Ireland) **Ken Doherty**	**5**
(Australia) Quinten Hann	1
3	(Scotland) **John Higgins**	**5**
(Scotland) Jamie Burnett	1
11	(England) **Jimmy White**	**5**
(England) David Gray	1
10	(Northern Ireland) Joe Swail	3
(England) **Joe Perry**	**5**
6	(Wales) **Matthew Stevens**	**5**
(Wales) Anthony Davies	3
7	(England) Peter Ebdon	1
(Scotland) **Billy Snaddon**	**5**
9	(England) Paul Hunter	2
(England) **Nigel Bond**	**5**
16	(Republic of Ireland) **Fergal O'Brien**	**5**
(England) Mark Davis	2
2	(Wales) **Mark Williams**	**5**
(Wales) Dominic Dale	2

Last 16; Best of 9 frames
1	(England) **Ronnie O'Sullivan**	**5**
(Thailand) James Wattana	1
14	(Scotland) Graeme Dott	0
5	(Scotland) **Stephen Hendry**	**5**
8	(England) **Stephen Lee**	**5**
(Republic of Ireland) Michael Judge	1
12	(Scotland) Alan McManus	3
4	(Republic of Ireland) **Ken Doherty**	**5**
3	(Scotland) John Higgins	1
11	(England) **Jimmy White**	**5**
(England) **Joe Perry**	**5**
6	(Wales) Matthew Stevens	2
(Scotland) **Billy Snaddon**	**5**
(England) Nigel Bond	4
16	(Republic of Ireland) Fergal O'Brien	2
2	(Wales) **Mark Williams**	**5**

Quarter-finals; Best of 9 frames
1	(England) Ronnie O'Sullivan	4
5	(Scotland) **Stephen Hendry**	**5**
8	(England) Stephen Lee	4
4	(Republic of Ireland) **Ken Doherty**	**5**
11	(England) Jimmy White	3
(England) **Joe Perry**	**5**
(Scotland) Billy Snaddon	2
2	(Wales) **Mark Williams**	**5**

Semi-finals; Best of 11 frames
5	(Scotland) **Stephen Hendry**	**6**
4	(Republic of Ireland) Ken Doherty	4
(England) **Joe Perry**	**6**
2	(Wales) Mark Williams	2

Final; Best of 17 frames
5	(Scotland) **Stephen Hendry**	**9**
(England) Joe Perry	2

== Final ==
Final: Best of 17 frames. Referee: Michael Montalto. Mediterranean Conference Centre, Valletta, Malta, 1 December 2001.
Stephen Hendry (5); Scotland	9–2	Joe Perry; England
Afternoon: 124–4 (124), 5–118 (118), 93–1 (88), 117–0 (73), 28–84, 130–8 (130), 81–0 (53), 90–30 (50); Evening: 69–22, 86–33 (82), 66–27
130	Highest break	118
2	Century breaks	1
7	50+ breaks	1
