= 1998 Irish Open =

Tournament information
- Dates: 14–20 December 1998
- Venue: National Basketball Arena
- City: Tallaght
- Country: Ireland
- Organisation: WPBSA
- Format: Ranking event
- Total prize fund: £305,000
- Winner's share: £50,000
- Highest break: Mark Williams (WAL) (139)

Final
- Champion: Mark Williams (WAL)
- Runner-up: Alan McManus (SCO)
- Score: 9–4

The 1998 Irish Open was a professional ranking snooker tournament, held from 14 to 20 December 1998 at the National Basketball Arena, Tallaght, Ireland, of which only one edition was held. Mark Williams won the tournament by defeating Alan McManus 9–4 in the final.

== Prize fund ==
The breakdown of prize money for this year is shown below:

- Winner: £50,000
- Runner-up: £26,000
- Semi-final: £13,000
- Quarter-final: £7,555
- Last 16: £3,750
- Last 32: £3,100
- Last 48: £1,800
- Last 64: £1,250
- Last 96: £890
- Overseas play-off round: £890
- Last 134: £205
- Televised highest break: £3,000
- Qualifying highest break: £1,000
- Total: £305,000

== Main draw ==
Last 32; Best of 9 frames
(Scotland) John Higgins	5
(England) Tony Knowles	3
(England) Stephen Lee	5
(Australia) Quinten Hann	0
(England) Matthew Couch	5
(Canada) Alain Robidoux	1
(England) John Parrott	5
(Wales) Dominic Dale	4
(Wales) Mark Williams	5
(Wales) Lee Walker	3
(Scotland) Graeme Dott	5
(England) Mark King	4
(England) Bradley Jones	5
(England) Nigel Bond	1
(Republic of Ireland) Ken Doherty	5
(Northern Ireland) Gerard Greene	4
(England) Jimmy Michie	5
(England) Ronnie O'Sullivan	4
(Scotland) Billy Snaddon	5
(England) Anthony Hamilton	4
(Wales) Paul Davies	5
(Thailand) James Wattana	4
(Scotland) Alan McManus	5
(England) Dave Harold	4
(England) Peter Ebdon	5
(England) Jimmy White	4
(Malta) Tony Drago	5
(England) Karl Broughton	4
(England) Paul Hunter	5
(England) Steve Davis	4
(Scotland) Stephen Hendry	5
(England) Joe Perry	1

Last 16; Best of 9 frames
(Scotland) John Higgins	3
(England) Stephen Lee	5
(England) Matthew Couch	4
(England) John Parrott	5
(Wales) Mark Williams	5
(Scotland) Graeme Dott	0
(England) Bradley Jones	2
(Republic of Ireland) Ken Doherty	5
(England) Jimmy Michie	0
(Scotland) Billy Snaddon	5
(Wales) Paul Davies	4
(Scotland) Alan McManus	5
(England) Peter Ebdon	4
(Malta) Tony Drago	5
(England) Paul Hunter	3
(Scotland) Stephen Hendry	5

Quarter-finals; Best of 9 frames
(England) Stephen Lee	2
(England) John Parrott	5
(Wales) Mark Williams	5
(Republic of Ireland) Ken Doherty	1
(Scotland) Billy Snaddon	3
(Scotland) Alan McManus	5
(Malta) Tony Drago	5
(Scotland) Stephen Hendry	4

Semi-finals; Best of 11 frames
(England) John Parrott	1
(Wales) Mark Williams	6
(Scotland) Alan McManus	6
(Malta) Tony Drago	3

Final; Best of 17 frames
(Wales) Mark Williams	9
(Scotland) Alan McManus	4

== Final ==
Final: Best of 17 frames. Referee: Len Ganley; National Basketball Arena, Dublin, Ireland, 20 December 1998.
Mark Williams; Wales	9–4	Alan McManus; Scotland
Afternoon: 62–25, 64–8, 64–20 (64), 44–36, 78–4 (64), 135–0 (135), 47–60, 49–53; Evening: 7–91 (71),68–1 (53), 75–16 (62), 0–82 (82), 107–0 (65)
135	Highest break	82
1	Century breaks	0
6	50+ breaks	2

== Century breaks ==
- 139, 133, 118, 103, 101 – Mark Williams
- 120 – Alan McManus
- 118, 102 – Bradley Jones
- 117 – James Wattana
- 109, 100 – Ken Doherty
- 106 – Tony Drago
- 104 – Anthony Hamilton
- 104, 100 – Stephen Hendry
