= Darren Morgan =

Welsh snooker player

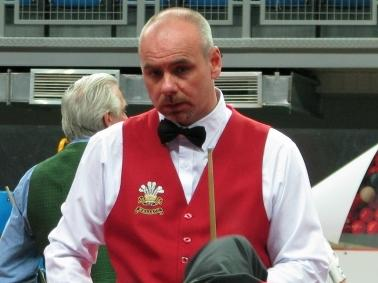
- Darren Morgan at the 2008 European Snooker Championship

Personal information
- Born: 3 May 1966 (age 60) Newport, Wales

Sport
- Country: Wales
- Sport: Snooker
- Professional: 1988–2006
- Highest ranking: 8 (1994–95–1995–96)
- Century breaks: 111
- Best ranking finish: Runner-up (×2)
Medal record
Men's snooker
Representing United Kingdom
World Games
Bronze medal – third place	2022 Birmingham	Singles

Darren Morgan (born 3 May 1966) is a Welsh former professional snooker player.

Morgan won the World Amateur Championship in 1987 and played on the professional main tour from 1988 until 2006. He reached a high ranking of eight and was ranked within the top 16 for six years despite never winning a ranking event. He compiled 111 century breaks in his career.

== Career ==
Morgan was born in Newport, South Wales.

His best achievements as a professional were to win the Irish Masters in 1996, beating Steve Davis 9–8 in the final, and he captained Wales to victory in the 1999 Nations Cup. He was also a semi-finalist in the 1994 World Championship, beating Mark King 10–5, Willie Thorne 13–12 and John Parrott 13–11 before losing to Jimmy White 9–16. He was also a quarter-finalist on three occasions, beating Ken Doherty and Ronnie O'Sullivan in 1996 and 1997 respectively at the Crucible.

Morgan still plays in amateur and pro-am events, and won the EBSA Masters and World Masters Championship titles in 2007. On 22 October 2009 he won the TCC Pro-Am by beating fellow Welshman Mark Williams 7–4 in the final.

On 23 November 2009 Morgan won his second IBSF World Snooker Championship in the Masters section, defeating three-time defending champion Dene O'Kane of New Zealand 6–0 in the final.

Morgan entered the 2010 World Open as an amateur along with fellow senior Tony Knowles and caused an upset by reaching the last 64 of the competition, before narrowly losing to former world number four Matthew Stevens 3–2 in round three.

In November 2011, he entered the World Seniors Championships in Peterborough and came away with victory over Steve Davis in the final. Morgan beat former world champion Cliff Thorburn and 'Whirlwind' Jimmy White in the previous rounds before facing the six-times world champion in the final. In fact, Morgan had to win qualifying matches just to reach the final stages of the tournament. He beat Davis 2–1 in the final and came home to his Club in Cross Keys with the trophy.

In June 2016, as a wildcard entry to the Riga Masters having won the EBSA European Open title several weeks prior, Morgan overcame Bradley Jones 4–3, Adam Stefanow 4–2, Zhao Xintong 4–1, Doherty 4–3 and Xiao Guodong 4–2 to set up a semi-final encounter with Neil Robertson. Appearing at this stage of a ranking event for the first time since 2002, and becoming the oldest ranking semi-finalist since Rex Williams in 1986, Morgan was whitewashed 5–0 by the eventual champion.

Morgan made a maximum break of 147 against Gareth Edwards in an amateur Seniors event in 2023; this possibly makes him the oldest player to achieve a maximum break in competition.

== Personal life ==
He lives with his wife, Tracy, and their three daughters in Newbridge, and owns a nearby snooker club and sports shop that provides printing, embroidery, trophies and engraving in Crosskeys, Newport, named The Red Triangle, where he coaches young players. Darren now lives in Pentwynmawr, Newbridge where he is starting up a property portfolio

== Performance and rankings timeline ==
Tournament	1988/ 89	1989/ 90	1990/ 91	1991/ 92	1992/ 93	1993/ 94	1994/ 95	1995/ 96	1996/ 97	1997/ 98	1998/ 99	1999/ 00	2000/ 01	2001/ 02	2002/ 03	2003/ 04	2004/ 05	2005/ 06	2010/ 11	2011/ 12	2012/ 13	2013/ 14	2014/ 15	2015/ 16	2016/ 17	2017/ 18
Ranking	(Note: New players on the Main Tour do not have a ranking.)	53	40	33	16	10	8	8	9	15	22	23	25	39	54	63	75	66	(Note: He was an amateur.)							
Ranking tournaments
Riga Masters (Note: The event ran under different names such as the Riga Open (2014/2015 to 2015/2016).)	Tournament Not Held																						Minor-Rank		SF	A
World Open (Note: The event ran under different names such as the Grand Prix (1987/1988 to 2000/2001) and the LG Cup (2001/2002 to 2003/2004).)	LQ	1R	2R	1R	2R	2R	2R	3R	3R	3R	3R	1R	1R	LQ	LQ	LQ	1R	2R	LQ	A	A	A	A	A	A	A
European Masters (Note: The event ran under different names such as European Open (1988/1989 to 1996/1997 and 2001/2002 to 2003/2004) and Irish Open (1998/1999).)	LQ	1R	2R	QF	3R	2R	2R	2R	2R	NH	LQ	Not Held		LQ	LQ	LQ	LQ	LQ	Tournament Not Held						A	A
UK Championship	LQ	LQ	2R	3R	QF	SF	QF	2R	1R	3R	1R	QF	1R	LQ	LQ	LQ	LQ	LQ	A	A	A	A	A	A	A	A
Scottish Open (Note: The event ran under different names such as International Open (1987/1988 to 1996/1997) and Players Championship (2003/2004).)	LQ	1R	Not Held		1R	3R	3R	1R	1R	1R	1R	1R	WD	LQ	LQ	LQ	Tournament Not Held								A	A
German Masters (Note: The event ran under different names such as German Open (1994/1995 to 1996/1997).)	Tournament Not Held							QF	2R	1R	NR	Tournament Not Held							A	A	A	A	A	A	A	A
Welsh Open	Not Held			F	1R	3R	2R	QF	1R	1R	1R	1R	LQ	LQ	LQ	LQ	LQ	LQ	A	A	A	A	A	A	A	LQ
China Open (Note: The event ran under different names as China International (1997/1998 and 1998/1999))	Tournament Not Held									NR	LQ	LQ	LQ	QF	Not Held		LQ	LQ	A	A	A	A	A	A	A	A
World Championship	1R	QF	LQ	LQ	2R	SF	2R	QF	QF	2R	1R	1R	LQ	LQ	LQ	LQ	LQ	LQ	A	A	A	A	A	A	A	A
Non-ranking tournaments
Six-red World Championship	Tournament Not Held																		2R	NH	2R	RR	A	A	2R	RR
The Masters	A	A	LQ	LQ	WR	1R	1R	QF	1R	1R	LQ	LQ	LQ	LQ	LQ	LQ	A	A	A	A	A	A	A	A	A	A
World Seniors Championship	Not Held			LQ	Tournament Not Held														A	W	SF	QF	QF	F	A	A
Former ranking tournaments
Canadian Masters	1R	Tournament Not Held																								
Hong Kong Open (Note: The event ran under different names as Australian Open (1994/1995) and Australian Masters (1995/1996).)	NH	LQ	Tournament Not Held				NR	NR	Tournament Not Held																	
Classic	LQ	3R	LQ	3R	Tournament Not Held																					
Strachan Open	Not Held			3R	MR	NR	Tournament Not Held																			
Dubai Classic (Note: The event run under different names as Dubai Masters (1988/1989), Thailand Classic (1995/1996) and Asian Classic (1996/1997))	NR	1R	3R	3R	2R	2R	2R	2R	1R	Tournament Not Held																
Malta Grand Prix	Tournament Not Held						Non-Ranking Event					LQ	NR	Tournament Not Held												
Thailand Masters (Note: The event ran under different names such as Asian Open (1989/1990 to 1992/1993) and Thailand Open (1993/1994 to 1996/1997).)	NH	1R	2R	1R	F	QF	QF	1R	1R	1R	SF	LQ	1R	LQ	NR	Tournament Not Held										
British Open	2R	2R	1R	3R	3R	3R	2R	QF	2R	1R	2R	2R	1R	LQ	LQ	LQ	LQ	Tournament Not Held								
Irish Masters	Non-Ranking Event														LQ	LQ	LQ	Tournament Not Held								
Former non-ranking tournaments
New Zealand Masters	QF	A	A	A	A	A	A	Tournament Not Held																		
Shoot-Out	Not Held		W	Tournament Not Held															A	A	A	A	A	A	Ranking	
European Grand Masters	Not Held		QF	Tournament Not Held																						
World Masters	Not Held		SF	Tournament Not Held																						
Welsh Professional Championship	QF	W	W	Tournament Not Held																						
World Matchplay	A	A	A	A	1R	Tournament Not Held																				
Pot Black	A	A	A	A	A	2R	Tournament Not Held											A	Tournament Not Held							
King's Cup	Not Held		A	NH	A	F	A	Tournament Not Held																		
Charity Challenge	Tournament Not Held						1R	QF	1R	A	A	A	A	A	Tournament Not Held											
Malta Grand Prix	Tournament Not Held						A	SF	QF	A	A	R	A	Tournament Not Held												
Scottish Masters	NH	A	QF	A	A	A	1R	SF	1R	LQ	A	A	A	A	A	Tournament Not Held										
Irish Masters	A	A	A	A	A	A	A	1R	W	F	A	A	A	A	Ranking Event			Tournament Not Held								
Pontins Professional	W	QF	QF	QF	F	A	SF	SF	A	QF	QF	W	Tournament Not Held													
Masters Qualifying Event (Note: The event was also called the Benson & Hedges Championship (1990/1991–2002/2003))	Not Held		SF	F	MR	A	A	A	A	4R	4R	1R	2R	3R	2R	A	NH	A	A	A	Tournament Not Held					

Performance Table Legend
LQ	lost in the qualifying draw	#R	lost in the early rounds of the tournament (WR = Wildcard round, RR = Round robin)	QF	lost in the quarter-finals
SF	lost in the semi–finals	F	lost in the final	W	won the tournament
DNQ	did not qualify for the tournament	A	did not participate in the tournament	WD	withdrew from the tournament

NH / Not Held	means an event was not held.
NR / Non-Ranking Event	means an event is/was no longer a ranking event.
R / Ranking Event	means an event is/was a ranking event.
MR / Minor-Ranking Event	means an event is/was a minor-ranking event.

== Career finals ==
=== Ranking finals: 2 ===
Outcome	No.	Year	Championship	Opponent in the final	Score
Runner-up	1.	1992	Welsh Open	(Scotland) Stephen Hendry	3–9
Runner-up	2.	1993	Asian Open	(England) Dave Harold	3–9

=== Non-ranking finals: 11 (6 titles) ===
Outcome	No.	Year	Championship	Opponent in the final	Score
Winner	1.	1989	Pontins Professional	(Malta) Tony Drago	9–2
Runner-up	1.	1989	WPBSA Invitational - Event 1	(Australia) Robby Foldvari	1–8
Winner	2.	1990	Welsh Professional Championship	(Wales) Doug Mountjoy	9–7
Winner	3.	1990	Shoot-Out	(England) Mike Hallett	2–1
Winner	4.	1991	Welsh Professional Championship (2)	(Wales) Mark Bennett	9–3
Runner-up	2.	1991	Benson & Hedges Championship	(Republic of Ireland) Ken Doherty	3–9
Runner-up	3.	1993	Pontins Professional	(Republic of Ireland) Ken Doherty	3–9
Runner-up	4.	1993	King's Cup	(Thailand) James Wattana	3–8
Winner	5.	1996	Irish Masters	(England) Steve Davis	9–8
Runner-up	5.	1997	Irish Masters	(Scotland) Stephen Hendry	8–9
Winner	6.	2000	Pontins Professional (2)	(England) Jimmy White	9–2

=== Team finals: 2 (1 title) ===
Outcome	No.	Year	Championship	Team/partner	Opponent(s) in the final	Score
Winner	1.	1999	Nations Cup	Wales	Scotland	6–4
Runner-up	1.	2000	Nations Cup	Wales	England	4–6

=== Pro-am finals: 7 (2 titles) ===
Outcome	No.	Year	Championship	Opponent in the final	Score
Runner-up	1.	1989	Dutch Open	(England) Mike Hallett	5–6
Runner-up	2.	1996	Pontins Spring Open	(Republic of Ireland) Ken Doherty	3–7
Runner-up	3.	1999	TCC Open Snooker Championship	(Wales) Ryan Day	4–6
Winner	1.	2000	TCC Open Snooker Championship	(Wales) Ryan Day	6–3
Runner-up	4.	2003	TCC Open Snooker Championship (2)	(Wales) Mark Williams	1–6
Runner-up	5.	2004	TCC Open Snooker Championship (3)	(Wales) Mark Williams	6–7
Winner	2.	2009	TCC Open Snooker Championship (2)	(Wales) Mark Williams	7–4

=== Amateur finals: 36 (30 titles) ===
Outcome	No.	Year	Championship	Opponent in the final	Score
Winner	1.	1987	Welsh Amateur Championship	(Wales) John Herbert	8–4
Winner	2.	1987	World Amateur Championship	(Malta) Joe Grech	11–4
Winner	3.	2007	European Amateur Championship - Masters	(Northern Ireland) Kieran McMahon	6–2
Winner	4.	2007	World Amateur Championship - Masters	(Thailand) Kanchai Wongjan	9–1
Runner-up	1.	2009	Welsh Amateur Championship	(Wales) Michael White	2–8
Winner	5.	2009	European Amateur Championship - Masters (2)	(Republic of Ireland) Joe Delaney	6–3
Winner	6.	2009	Bargoed Labour Club Invitational	(Wales) Ian Sargeant	5–4
Winner	7.	2009	World Amateur Championship - Masters (2)	(Australia) Dene O'Kane	6–0
Winner	8.	2010	European Amateur Championship - Masters (3)	(Republic of Ireland) Joe Delaney	6–0
Winner	9.	2012	European Amateur Championship - Masters (4)	(England) Steve Judd	6–0
Winner	10.	2012	World Amateur Championship - Masters (3)	(Australia) Glen Wilkinson	6–2
Winner	11.	2013	European Amateur Championship - Masters (5)	(Ukraine) Alan Trigg	6–3
Runner-up	2.	2014	World Amateur Championship - Masters	(Thailand) Phisit Chandsri	5–6
Winner	12.	2015	Welsh Amateur Championship (2)	(Wales) Daniel Wells	8–0
Winner	13.	2015	European Amateur Championship - Masters (6)	(England) Jamie Bodle	6–2
Runner-up	3.	2016	Welsh Amateur Championship (2)	(Wales) David John	7–8
Winner	14.	2016	European Snooker Open	(Israel) Shachar Ruberg	4–1
Winner	15.	2016	European Amateur Championship - Masters (7)	(Republic of Ireland) Brendan Thomas	6–0
Winner	16.	2016	IBSF World 6-Reds Snooker Championship	(Hong Kong) Chau Hon Man	6–4
Runner-up	4.	2017	Welsh Amateur Championship (3)	(Wales) Rhydian Richards	4–8
Winner	17.	2017	European Snooker Open (2)	(Republic of Ireland) Michael Judge	4–1
Winner	18.	2017	European Amateur Championship - Masters (8)	(Wales) Elfed Evans	6–2
Winner	19.	2017	IBSF World 6-Reds Snooker Championship (2)	(India) Kamal Chawla	6–4
Winner	20.	2017	World Amateur Championship - Masters (4)	(England) Aiden Owens	6–3
Runner-up	5.	2018	WSF Seniors Championship	(Brazil) Igor Figueiredo	3–5
Winner	21.	2018	European Snooker Shoot-Out	(Switzerland) Tom Zimmermann	1–0
Winner	22.	2018	European Amateur Championship - Masters (9)	(Republic of Ireland) John Farrell	4–2
Winner	23.	2018	World Amateur Championship - Masters (5)	(Afghanistan) Saleh Mohammadi	6–0
Winner	24.	2019	Welsh Amateur Championship (3)	(Wales) Gavin Lewis	8–2
Winner	25.	2019	European Amateur Championship - Masters (10)	(Ukraine) Alan Trigg	4–2
Runner-up	6.	2020	European 6-Reds Championship	(Ukraine) Iulian Boiko	3–5
Winner	26.	2021	European Amateur Championship - Masters (11)	(Republic of Ireland) Frank Sarsfield	4–0
Winner	27.	2022	European Amateur Championship - Masters (12)	(England) Wayne Brown	4–3
Winner	28.	2022	Welsh Amateur Championship (4)	(Wales) Liam Davies	8–2
Winner	29.	2022	World Amateur Championship - Masters (6)	(India) Manan Chandra	5–3
Winner	30.	2023	European Amateur Championship - Masters (13)	(England) Gary Milne	5–3

=== Seniors finals: 3 (1 title) ===
Outcome	No.	Year	Championship	Opponent in the final	Score
Winner	1.	2011	World Seniors Championship	(England) Steve Davis	2–1
Runner-up	1.	2016	World Seniors Championship	(England) Mark Davis	1–2
Runner-up	2.	2019	World Seniors Championship (2)	(England) Jimmy White	3–5
