= 1994 Thailand Open =

Thailand Open
Tournament information
- Dates: 4–16 March 1994
- Venue: Imperial Queens Park Hotel
- City: Bangkok
- Country: Thailand
- Organisation: WPBSA
- Format: Ranking event

Final
- Champion: James Wattana (THA)
- Runner-up: Steve Davis (ENG)
- Score: 9–7

The 1994 Kloster Thailand Open was a professional ranking snooker tournament that took place between 4–16 March 1994 at the Imperial Queens Park Hotel in Bangkok, Thailand.

James Wattana won the tournament by defeating Steve Davis 9–7 in the final. Dave Harold was the defending champion, having won the tournament the previous year under its previous name, but he was eliminated in the last 16 by Joe Swail.

== Wildcard round ==
Match		Score	
WC1	Guo Hua (CHN)	5–3	David Finbow (ENG)
WC2	Jimmy Michie (ENG)	5–2	Nut Wiangchai (THA)
WC3	Tai Pichit (THA)	5–2	Colin Morton (ENG)
WC4	Rom Surin (THA)	5–1	Steve Judd (ENG)

== Main draw ==
Last 32; Best of 9 frames
(England) Dave Harold	5
(Canada) Cliff Thorburn	4
(Northern Ireland) Joe Swail	5
(England) Nigel Bond	2
(Wales) Terry Griffiths	5
(England) Jimmy Michie	0
(Thailand) James Wattana	5
(England) Ronnie O'Sullivan	0
(England) Dean Reynolds	5
(England) Willie Thorne	2
(Malta) Tony Drago	5
(Northern Ireland) Dennis Taylor	1
(Canada) Alain Robidoux	5
(England) Martin Clark	1
(England) Jimmy White	5
(Republic of Ireland) Stephen Murphy	0
(England) John Parrott	5
(Thailand) Rom Surin	0
(England) Peter Ebdon	5
(England) Steve James	4
(England) Neal Foulds	5
(China) Guo Hua	2
(England) Steve Davis	5
(England) Tony Knowles	3
(Scotland) Alan McManus	5
(England) Tony Jones	4
(Republic of Ireland) Ken Doherty	5
(New Zealand) Dene O'Kane	2
(Wales) Darren Morgan	5
(England) Mick Price	0
(Thailand) Tai Pichit	5
(Scotland) Stephen Hendry	2

Last 16; Best of 9 frames
(England) Dave Harold	1
(Northern Ireland) Joe Swail	5
(Wales) Terry Griffiths	1
(Thailand) James Wattana	5
(England) Dean Reynolds	3
(Malta) Tony Drago	5
(Canada) Alain Robidoux	3
(England) Jimmy White	5
(England) John Parrott	0
(England) Peter Ebdon	5
(England) Neal Foulds	0
(England) Steve Davis	5
(Scotland) Alan McManus	5
(Republic of Ireland) Ken Doherty	4
(Wales) Darren Morgan	5
(Thailand) Tai Pichit	4

Quarter-finals; Best of 9 frames
(Northern Ireland) Joe Swail	1
(Thailand) James Wattana	5
(Malta) Tony Drago	3
(England) Jimmy White	5
(England) Peter Ebdon	4
(England) Steve Davis	5
(Scotland) Alan McManus	5
(Wales) Darren Morgan	4

Semi-finals; Best of 11 frames
(Thailand) James Wattana	5
(England) Jimmy White	1
(England) Steve Davis	5
(Scotland) Alan McManus	4

Final; Best of 17 frames
(Thailand) James Wattana	9
(England) Steve Davis	7
