= 1991 European Masters League =

European Masters League
Tournament information
- Dates: 30 May – 28 June 1991
- Format: Non-ranking event
- Total prize fund: £40,000
- Winner's share: £15,000

Final
- Champion: (England) Steve Davis
- Runner-up: (Thailand) James Wattana

The 1991 European Masters League was a professional non-ranking snooker tournament, which took place between 30 May and 28 June 1991. Held on just one occasion, four players participated and it was won by Steve Davis, who claimed the first title of the 1991-92 snooker season.

== League phase ==
POS	Player	MP	MW	FW	FL	FD	PTS
Winner	(England) Steve Davis	3	3	17	7	+10	3
Runner-up	(Thailand) James Wattana	3	2	15	9	+6	2
3	(Malta) Tony Drago	3	1	10	14	−4	1
4	(England) Jimmy White	3	0	6	18	−12	0

- 30 May – Antwerp, Belgium
  - Steve Davis 5–3 James Wattana
- 2 June – Waldorf Hotel, London, England
  - James Wattana 7–1 Jimmy White
- 5 June – Berlin, Germany
  - James Wattana 5–3 Tony Drago
- 12 June – Antwerp, Belgium
  - Tony Drago 5–3 Jimmy White
- 14 June – Rotterdam, Netherlands
  - Steve Davis 6–2 Tony Drago
- 28 June – Hamburg, Germany
  - Steve Davis 6–2 Jimmy White
