= 1999 Thailand Masters =

Thailand Masters
Tournament information
- Dates: 1–7 March 1999
- Venue: Ambassador Hotel
- City: Bangkok
- Country: Thailand
- Organisation: WPBSA
- Format: Ranking event
- Total prize fund: £295,000
- Winner's share: £50,000

Final
- Champion: Mark Williams (WAL)
- Runner-up: Alan McManus (SCO)
- Score: 9–7

The 1999 Thailand Masters was a professional ranking snooker tournament that took place between 1–7 March 1999 at the Ambassador Hotel in Bangkok, Thailand.

Mark Williams retained the title by winning in the final 9–7 against Alan McManus.

== Wildcard round ==
| Match | | Score | |
|---|---|---|---|
| WC1 | Hugh Abernethy (SCO) | 5–3 | Atthasit Mahitthi (THA) |
| WC2 | Chan Wai Tat (THA) | w/o–w/d | Dean Reynolds (ENG) |
| WC3 | Dave Finbow (ENG) | 5–2 | Kwan Poomjang (THA) |
| WC4 | Ian McCulloch (ENG) | 5–1 | Phirom Ritthiprasong (THA) |

== Main draw ==
Last 32; Best of 9 frames
(Scotland) Stephen Hendry | 5
(Wales) Paul Davies | 4
(Canada) Alain Robidoux | 5
(Australia) Quinten Hann | 1
(Malta) Tony Drago | 4
(Scotland) Euan Henderson | 5
(Wales) Mark Williams | 5
(Scotland) Hugh Abernethy | 3
(England) John Parrott | 5
(England) Dave Harold | 4
(England) Stephen Lee | 5
(Scotland) Billy Snaddon | 3
(Thailand) James Wattana | 5
(England) Bradley Jones | 3
(Republic of Ireland) Ken Doherty | 5
(Thailand) Chan Wai Tat | 3
(England) Ronnie O'Sullivan | 4
(Wales) Darren Morgan | 5
(England) Nigel Bond | 5
(England) Dave Finbow | 0
(England) Steve Davis | 5
(Wales) Dominic Dale | 2
(England) Peter Ebdon | 5
(England) Paul Hunter | 4
(Scotland) Alan McManus | 5
(Wales) Matthew Stevens | 4
(England) Anthony Hamilton | 3
(Northern Ireland) Joe Swail | 5
(England) Mark King | 5
(Scotland) Jamie Burnett | 1
(Scotland) John Higgins | 5
(England) Ian McCulloch | 2

Last 16; Best of 9 frames
(Scotland) Stephen Hendry | 5
(Canada) Alain Robidoux | 1
(Scotland) Euan Henderson | 2
(Wales) Mark Williams | 5
(England) John Parrott | 5
(England) Stephen Lee | 3
(Thailand) James Wattana | 2
(Republic of Ireland) Ken Doherty | 5
(Wales) Darren Morgan | 5
(England) Nigel Bond | 1
(England) Steve Davis | 5
(England) Peter Ebdon | 1
(Scotland) Alan McManus | 5
(Northern Ireland) Joe Swail | 4
(England) Mark King | 3
(Scotland) John Higgins | 5

Quarter-finals; Best of 9 frames
(Scotland) Stephen Hendry | 2
(Wales) Mark Williams | 5
(England) John Parrott | 5
(Republic of Ireland) Ken Doherty | 3
(Wales) Darren Morgan | 5
(England) Steve Davis | 3
(Scotland) Alan McManus | 5
(Scotland) John Higgins | 4

Semi-finals; Best of 11 frames
(Wales) Mark Williams | 6
(England) John Parrott | 2
(Wales) Darren Morgan | 1
(Scotland) Alan McManus | 6

Final; Best of 17 frames
(Wales) Mark Williams | 9
(Scotland) Alan McManus | 7

== Final ==
Final: Best of 17 frames. Ambassador Hotel, Bangkok, Thailand. 7 March 1999.
| Mark Williams; Wales | 9–7 | Alan McManus; Scotland |
Afternoon: 87–0 (87), 114–2 (106), 0–94 (59), 64–10 (64), 53–62 (Williams 52), 77–63 (70), 72–17 (72), 68–24; Evening: 57–69 (Williams 57), 70–43 (65), 60–12, 12–65, 22–62, 53–73, 2–62, 78–46
| 106 | Highest break | 59 |
| 1 | Century breaks | 0 |
| 6 | 50+ breaks | 3 |
