= 1991 Thailand Masters =

Invitational snooker tournament

Tournament information
- Venue: Bangkok
- Country: Thailand
- Format: Non-ranking event
- Winner's share: £15,000
- Highest break: Stephen Hendry (SCO) 124

Final
- Champion: Steve Davis (ENG)
- Runner-up: Stephen Hendry (SCO)
- Score: 6–3

The 1991 Thailand Masters was an invitational non-ranking snooker tournament held in Bangkok in 1991. Steve Davis won the title, defeating Stephen Hendry 6–3 in the final, and received £15,000 prize money. John Parrott, playing in his first tournament since winning the 1991 World Snooker Championship, lost 4–5 to Hendry in the semi-finals. Hendry compiled the highest break of the tournament, 124, during his quarter-final defeat of Mike Hallett.

== Results ==
First round

Player	Score	Player
James Wattana (THA)	5–1	Noppadol Noppajoro (THA)
Suriya Suwannasingh (THA)	5–0	Karen Corr (NIR)
Allison Fisher (ENG)	5–4	Chuchart Trirattanapradit (THA)
Terry Griffiths (WAL)	5–4	Praput Chaithanasakun (THA)

Second round

Player	Score	Player
Gary Wilkinson (ENG)	5–3	Allison Fisher (ENG)
Neal Foulds (ENG)	5–1	Suriya Suwannasingh (THA)
Steve James (ENG)	5–4	James Wattana (THA)
Mike Hallett (ENG)	5–2	Terry Griffiths (WAL)

Quarter-finals; Best-of-9 frames
(England) John Parrott	5
(England) Gary Wilkinson	3
(Scotland) Stephen Hendry	5
(England) Mike Hallett	2
(England) Jimmy White	4
(England) Neal Foulds	5
(England) Steve Davis	5
(England) Steve James	1

Semi-finals; Best-of-9 frames
(England) John Parrott	4
(Scotland) Stephen Hendry	5
(England) Neal Foulds	1
(England) Steve Davis	5

Final; Best-of-11 frames
(Scotland) Stephen Hendry	3
(England) Steve Davis	6
