= 1991 Indian Challenge =

Invitational snooker tournament

Tournament information
- Dates: 4–7 September 1991
- Venue: Taj Palace Intercontinental Hotel
- City: Delhi
- Country: India
- Format: Non-ranking event
- Total prize fund: £72,000
- Winner's share: £20,000
- Highest break: John Parrott (ENG) (132)

Final
- Champion: Stephen Hendry (SCO)
- Runner-up: John Parrott (ENG)
- Score: 9–5

The 1991 Indian Challenge was an invitational non-ranking snooker tournament, which took place from 4 to 7 September 1991 at the Taj Palace Intercontinental Hotel in Delhi, India. Stephen Hendry won the title, defeating John Parrott 9–5 in the final, and received £20,000 prize money. Parrott compiled the highest break of the tournament, 132, in the semi-final, having made a 127 break in the preceding frame.

== Results ==
First round Best-of-9 frames
John Parrott (ENG)	5
Michael Ferreira (IND)	0
Mike Hallett (ENG)	5
Dennis Taylor (NIR)	2
Gary Wilkinson (ENG)	5
Chuchart Trirattanapradit (THA)	2
Jimmy White (ENG)	5
Atul Agarwal (IND)	0
Stephen Hendry (SCO)	5
Sonic Multani (IND)	4
Steve James (ENG)	5
Terry Griffiths (WAL)	2
Neal Foulds (ENG)	5
James Wattana (THA)	3
Steve Davis (ENG)	5
Geet Sethi (IND)	0

Quarter-finals; Best-of-9 frames
(England) John Parrott	5
(England) Mike Hallett	2
(England) Gary Wilkinson	5
(England) Jimmy White	2
(Scotland) Stephen Hendry	5
(England) Steve James	3
(England) Neal Foulds	2
(England) Steve Davis	5

Semi-finals; Best-of-9 frames
(England) John Parrott	5
(England) Gary Wilkinson	3
(Scotland) Stephen Hendry	5
(England) Steve Davis	3

Final; Best-of-17 frames
(England) John Parrott	5
(Scotland) Stephen Hendry	9
