= James Wattana =

Thai former professional snooker player (born 1970)

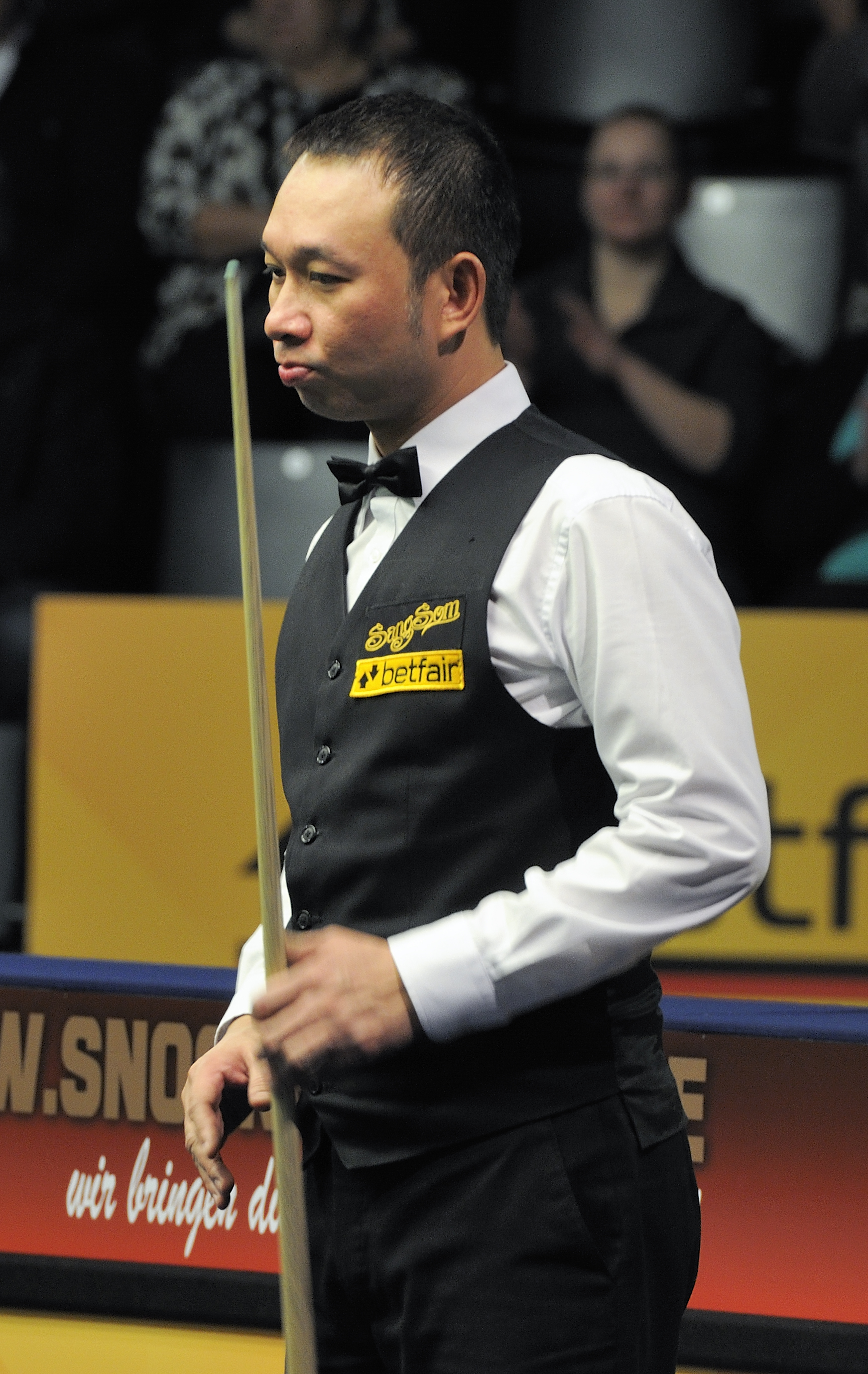
- Wattana at the 2013 German Masters

Personal information
- Nickname: The Thai-phoon
- Born: January 17, 1970 (age 56) Bangkok, Thailand

Sport
- Country: Thailand
- Sport: Snooker
- Professional: 1989–2008, 2009–2020
- Highest ranking: 3 (1994/95)
- Maximum breaks: 3
- Century breaks: 166

Tournament wins
- Ranking: 3
Medal record
Men's Snooker
Asian Games
Silver medal – second place	1998 Bangkok	Team
Bronze medal – third place	2010 Guangzhou	Team
Asian Indoor Games
Silver medal – second place	2007 Macau	Individual
Southeast Asian Games
Gold medal – first place	2021 Hanoi	Individual
Gold medal – first place	2023 Phnom Penh	Snooker 6-Red Doubles

James Wattana (Thai: เจมส์ วัฒนา; born January 17, 1970, as วัฒนา ภู่โอบอ้อม Wattana Pu-Ob-Orm, then renamed รัชพล ภู่โอบอ้อม Ratchapol Pu-Ob-Orm in 2003) is a Thai former professional snooker player.

A professional between 1989 and 2008, and from 2009 to 2020, Wattana reached his highest ranking position—world number 3—for the 1994–95 season. He has won three ranking tournaments, the 1992 Strachan Open and the Thailand Open in 1994 and 1995, and has finished as the runner-up in a further five ranking events. He twice reached the semi-finals of the World Snooker Championship, in 1993 and 1997. When he was defeated in the semi-finals in 1993 by Jimmy White, it was only Wattana's second appearance in the final televised stages at the Crucible Theatre, his first being the previous year when he lost in the second round to the eventual winner Stephen Hendry.

Having received two-year invitational tour cards in 2014, 2016 and 2018, Wattana fell off the main tour at the end of the 2019/2020 season.

Back in Thailand, Wattana is known as "Tong Sit Choi" (Thai: ต๋อง ศิษย์ฉ่อย, roughly "Tong, Disciple of Choi") a nickname which he got by winning a local youth tournament at the age of 14. "Choi" is from "Choi Susas" (Thai: ฉ่อย ซู่ซ่าส์), the nickname of Wattana's father and mentor Kowin Pu-Ob-Orm.

== Career ==
Wattana won his first major tournament, the Thailand Masters, in 1986, aged only 16. As an amateur, he won the Asian Snooker Championship twice and the £6,000 first prize for winning the 1988 Kent Challenge in Hong Kong. He turned professional in 1989, after winning the 1988 World Amateur Championship. His career peaked in the mid-1990s, when he twice won the Thailand Open and rose to number three in the world rankings. Prior to Wattana becoming a professional, snooker had been dominated by British (and to a lesser extent Irish, Canadian and Australian) players.

He was the eighth professional player to earn more than £1 million in prize money, and with three maximum breaks he is one of only eighteen players to have scored more than two maximums in competition. He scored his first one in 1991 at the World Masters and the second at the British Open, which was then, at seven minutes and nine seconds, the fastest ever made.

With the help of his PR team fronted by Yorkshire business tycoon Ed Clark, Wattana's success caught the imagination of the Thai public. He helped raise the profile of the game in the Far East, and has been followed into the game by many players from Thailand, Hong Kong, and China, the most successful being Marco Fu and Ding Junhui. He is a Commander Third Class of the Most Noble Order of the Crown of Thailand, only the second sportsman to receive the country's most prestigious civilian honour.

He reached the semi-finals of the World Snooker Championship in 1993 and 1997, losing narrowly in the latter to Stephen Hendry. After a strong 2004–05 season, he returned to the top 32 of the world rankings, despite being the first player since 1992 to experience a whitewash at the World Championship when he lost 0–10 against Ali Carter in the final round of qualifying at the 2005 tournament. By 2007, his continued poor form meant that he dropped off the main tour in 2008. He continued to play, however, and in 2008 he entered the World Amateur Championships in Wels, Austria, where he lost to eventual champion Thepchaiya Un-Nooh in the last 16. He won the 2009 Asian Championships in Tangshan, China, after beating Mei Xiwen 7–3 in the final.

His position on the current provisional rankings received a huge boost with a run to the venue stage of the China Open thanks to four straight qualifying victories.

The 2011/12 season proved to be relatively good, managing to qualify in 2 of the 8 ranking events, the Shanghai Masters losing to Ronnie O'Sullivan 1–15 and the German Masters, beating Stephen Hendry 5–1 in the qualifiers, but then losing to Graeme Dott in the first round. At the end of the season he finished ranked 63, just inside the top 64.

In 2014, he lost his place on the professional snooker circuit, as he finished outside the top 64 on the official world rankings list at the end of the 2013/2014 season. However, he was one of three players awarded an invitational tour card for the next season—alongside Hendry and Steve Davis—and has since competed fairly regularly in tournaments as an amateur. In 2015, he lost in the first round of the qualifiers for the World Championship 3–10 to Jimmy White. In 2016, he lost in the first round of the qualifiers for the World Championship 6–10 to Peter Ebdon.

== Performance and rankings timeline ==
Tournament	1985/ 86	1986/ 87	1989/ 90	1990/ 91	1991/ 92	1992/ 93	1993/ 94	1994/ 95	1995/ 96	1996/ 97	1997/ 98	1998/ 99	1999/ 00	2000/ 01	2001/ 02	2002/ 03	2003/ 04		2004/ 05	2005/ 06	2006/ 07	2007/ 08	2008/ 09	2009/ 10	2010/ 11	2011/ 12	2012/ 13	2013/ 14	2014/ 15	2015/ 16	2016/ 17	2017/ 18	2018/ 19	2019/ 20	2022/ 23
Ranking (Note: From the 2010/2011 season it shows the ranking at the beginning of the season.)	(Note: He was an amateur.)		(Note: New players on the Main Tour do not have a ranking.)	32	20	7	5	3	5	12	12	15	22	27	32	32	34		33	32	25	33			66	67	63	63	(Note: Players issued an invitational tour card began the season without ranking points.)	123		73		82	
Ranking tournaments
Riga Masters (Note: The event was called the Riga Open (2014/2015–2015/2016))	Tournament not held																												MR		A	A	A	A	
International Championship	Tournament not held																										LQ	2R	LQ	LQ	3R	LQ	1R	A	
China Championship	Tournament not held																														NR	A	LQ	LQ	
English Open	Tournament not held																														2R	4R	1R	1R	
World Open (Note: The event run under different names as Grand Prix (1990/1991–2000/2001 and 2004/2005–2009/2010), LG Cup (2001/2002–2003/2004), the World Open (2010/2011) and the Haikou World Open (2011/2012–2013/2014))	A	A	SF	LQ	1R	2R	2R	3R	3R	QF	2R	1R	3R	1R	1R	3R	3R		QF	1R	RR	LQ	A	A	1R	LQ	LQ	2R	Not held		WR	LQ	LQ	LQ	
Northern Ireland Open	Tournament not held																														1R	1R	1R	1R	
UK Championship	A	A	1R	3R	SF	QF	QF	SF	3R	2R	2R	1R	1R	1R	1R	1R	3R		1R	2R	1R	1R	A	LQ	LQ	LQ	LQ	2R	1R	1R	1R	1R	1R	1R	
Scottish Open (Note: The event run under different names as International Open (1986/1987–1996/1997) and Players Championship (2003/2004))	A	A	2R	Not held		2R	F	1R	1R	2R	2R	1R	2R	2R	1R	2R	LQ		Tournament not held								MR	Not held			1R	1R	1R	3R	
European Masters (Note: The event run under different names as the Malta Cup (2004/2005–2007/2008))	A	A	LQ	2R	1R	1R	QF	2R	1R	SF	NH	1R	Not held		2R	LQ	1R		2R	1R	LQ	NR	Tournament not held								LQ	LQ	LQ	A	
German Masters (Note: The event run under different name as German Open (1995/1996–1997/1998))	Tournament not held								2R	1R	2R	NR	Tournament not held												LQ	1R	LQ	LQ	A	LQ	LQ	A	A	A	
World Grand Prix	Tournament not held																												NR	DNQ	DNQ	DNQ	DNQ	DNQ	
Welsh Open	Tournament not held				QF	SF	SF	1R	1R	3R	1R	QF	3R	LQ	1R	LQ	1R		LQ	QF	1R	LQ	A	LQ	LQ	LQ	LQ	3R	A	1R	1R	3R	2R	2R	
Shoot-Out	Not held			NR	Tournament not held																				Non-ranking event						A	2R	1R	A	
Players Championship (Note: The event run under different name as Players Tour Championship Grand Finals (2010/2011–2012/2013))	Tournament not held																								DNQ	DNQ	1R	DNQ	DNQ	DNQ	DNQ	DNQ	DNQ	DNQ	
Gibraltar Open	Tournament not held																													MR	1R	A	A	A	
Tour Championship	Tournament not held																																DNQ	DNQ	
World Championship	A	A	LQ	LQ	2R	SF	QF	1R	2R	SF	1R	2R	LQ	1R	1R	1R	1R		LQ	1R	LQ	LQ	A	LQ	LQ	LQ	LQ	LQ	LQ	LQ	LQ	LQ	LQ	A	
Non-ranking tournaments
The Masters	A	A	1R	LQ	QF	F	SF	QF	1R	1R	QF	1R	LQ	LQ	LQ	LQ	LQ		A	A	A	A	A	A	A	A	A	A	A	A	A	A	A	A	
Six-red World Championship (Note: The event run under different names as Six-red Snooker International (2008/2009) and Six-red World Grand Prix (2009/2010))	Tournament not held																						SF	QF	3R	NH	2R	2R	2R	2R	2R	RR	QF	RR	2R
Former ranking tournaments
Classic	A	A	LQ	3R	SF	Tournament not held																													
Strachan Open	Tournament not held				W	MR	NR	Tournament not held																											
Dubai Classic (Note: The event run under different names as Thailand Classic (1995/1996) and Asian Classic (1996/1997))	Not held		2R	2R	2R	SF	2R	1R	2R	1R	Tournament not held																								
Malta Grand Prix	Tournament not held							Non-ranking event					LQ	NR	Tournament not held																				
Thailand Masters (Note: The event run under different names as Asian Open (1989/1990–1992/1993) and Thailand Open (1993/1994–1996/97))	Non-rank.		F	2R	2R	QF	W	W	QF	2R	2R	2R	LQ	LQ	1R	NR	Not held				NR	Tournament not held													
British Open	A	A	2R	3R	F	F	F	SF	2R	1R	2R	1R	3R	2R	1R	1R	LQ		LQ	Tournament not held															
Irish Masters	Non-ranking event															LQ	LQ		LQ	NH	NR	Tournament not held													
Northern Ireland Trophy	Tournament not held																			NR	2R	1R	A	Tournament not held											
Wuxi Classic (Note: The event run under different name as Jiangsu Classic (2008/2009–2009/2010))	Tournament not held																						Non-ranking event				LQ	LQ	A	Not held					
Australian Goldfields Open (Note: The event run under different names as Australian Open (1994/1995) and Australian Masters (1995/1996))	Tournament not held							Non-rank.		Tournament not held																LQ	LQ	LQ	A	A	Not held				
Shanghai Masters	Tournament not held																					LQ	A	LQ	LQ	1R	LQ	LQ	LQ	LQ	LQ	LQ	Non-rank.		
Paul Hunter Classic (Note: The event was called the Grand Prix Fürth (2004/2005) and the Fürth German Open (2005/2006–2006/2007))	Tournament not held																		Pro-am Event						Minor-ranking event						A	A	A	NR	
Indian Open	Tournament not held																											1R	LQ	NH	1R	LQ	A	NH	
China Open (Note: The event run under different name as China International (1997/1998–1998/1999))	Tournament not held										NR	1R	LQ	LQ	LQ	Not held			LQ	2R	1R	LQ	A	1R	LQ	LQ	LQ	2R	LQ	1R	LQ	LQ	2R	NH	
Former non-ranking tournaments
Pontins Professional	A	A	SF	A	A	A	A	A	A	A	A	A	A	Tournament not held																					
European Grand Masters	Not held			QF	Tournament not held																														
World Masters	Not held			SF	Tournament not held																														
London Masters	NH	A	A	QF	Tournament not held																														
European Masters League	Tournament not held				F	Tournament not held																													
Thailand Masters	RR	W	Ranking		2R	ranking event										A	Not held				A	Tournament not held													
Hong Kong Masters (Note: The event was also called the Hong Kong Challenge (1990/1991–1991/1992))	A	A	NH	W	F	Tournament not held																										A	Not held		
Indian Challenge	Tournament not held				1R	Tournament not held																													
Belgian Challenge	Tournament not held				1R	Tournament not held																													
Pot Black	A	A	A	A	A	F	A	Tournament not held												A	A	A	Tournament not held												
Kent Classic	NH	A	A	A	NH	QF	Tournament not held																												
Belgian Masters	Not held			A	A	W	Not held		A	Tournament not held																									
Nescafe Extra Challenge	Not held			F	NH	F	Tournament not held																												
World Matchplay	Not held		A	A	A	W	Tournament not held																												
Top Rank Classic	Tournament not held							RR	Tournament not held																										
King's Cup	Not held			F	NH	F	W	SF	Tournament not held																										
Scottish Masters	A	A	A	A	A	SF	1R	QF	A	A	A	A	A	A	A	A	Tournament not held																		
Irish Masters	A	A	A	A	A	QF	QF	QF	QF	A	A	A	A	A	A	ranking event				NH	A	Tournament not held													
Superstar International	Tournament not held										RR	Tournament not held																							
China International	Tournament not held										SF	ranking event				Not held			ranking event																
Super Challenge	Tournament not held											RR	Tournament not held																						
Premier League (Note: The event run under different names as Matchroom League (1986/1987–1991/1992) and European League (1992/1993–1996/1997))	NH	A	A	RR	SF	RR	A	A	A	A	A	A	A	A	RR	A	A		A	A	A	A	A	A	A	A	A	Tournament not held							
Euro-Asia Masters Challenge	Tournament not held																W	RR	Not held			F	Tournament not held												
World Champions v Asia Stars	Tournament not held																		RR	Tournament not held															
Masters Qualifying Event (Note: The event was also called the Benson & Hedges Championship (1990/1991–2002/2003))	Not held			F	QF	MR	A	A	A	A	A	A	3R	1R	1R	3R	3R		NH	A	A	A	A	3R	Tournament not held										
Shoot-Out	Not held			WD	Tournament not held																				A	1R	A	A	A	A	ranking event				

Performance table legend
LQ	lost in the qualifying draw	#R	lost in the early rounds of the tournament (WR = Wildcard round, RR = Round robin)	QF	lost in the quarter-finals
SF	lost in the semi-finals	F	lost in the final	W	won the tournament
DNQ	did not qualify for the tournament	A	did not participate in the tournament	WD	withdrew from the tournament
DQ	disqualified from the tournament				

NH / not held	event was not held.
NR / Non-ranking event	event is/was no longer a ranking event.
R / ranking event	event is/was a ranking event.
MR / Minor-ranking event	means an event is/was a minor-ranking event.
PA / Pro-am Event	means an event is/was a pro-am event.

== Career finals ==
=== Ranking finals: 8 (3 titles) ===
Outcome	No.	Year	Championship	Opponent in the final	Score
Runner-up	1.	1989	Asian Open	(Scotland) Stephen Hendry	6–9
Runner-up	2.	1992	British Open	(England) Jimmy White	7–10
Winner	1.	1992	Strachan Open	(England) John Parrott	9–5
Runner-up	3.	1993	British Open (2)	(England) Steve Davis	2–10
Runner-up	4.	1994	International Open	(England) John Parrott	4–9
Winner	2.	1994	Thailand Open	(England) Steve Davis	9–7
Runner-up	5.	1994	British Open (3)	(England) Ronnie O'Sullivan	4–9
Winner	3.	1995	Thailand Open (2)	(England) Ronnie O'Sullivan	9–6

=== Non-ranking finals: 19 (9 titles) ===
Legend
The Masters (0–1)
Other (9–9)

Outcome	No.	Year	Championship	Opponent in the final	Score
Winner	1.	1986	Thailand Masters	(Wales) Terry Griffiths	2–1
Winner	2.	1988	Kent Challenge	(Hong Kong) Franky Chan	3–1
Winner	3.	1990	World Series Challenge	(England) Jimmy White	9–3
Winner	4.	1990	WPBSA Invitational	(England) Troy Shaw	5–3
Runner-up	1.	1990	Benson & Hedges Championship	(Scotland) Alan McManus	5–9
Runner-up	2.	1990	King's Cup	(Northern Ireland) Joe Swail	4–8
Runner-up	3.	1991	Nescafe Extra Challenge	(England) Joe Johnson	Round–Robin
Runner-up	4.	1991	European Masters League	(England) Steve Davis	Round–Robin
Runner-up	5.	1991	Hong Kong Challenge	(Scotland) Stephen Hendry	1–9
Runner-up	6.	1992	Pot Black	(England) Neal Foulds	176–252 points
Winner	5.	1992	Belgian Masters	(England) John Parrott	10–5
Winner	6.	1992	Super League	(England) Jimmy White	Round–Robin
Winner	7.	1992	World Matchplay	(England) Steve Davis	9–4
Runner-up	7.	1992	King's Cup (2)	(England) Nigel Bond	7–8
Runner-up	8.	1993	Nescafe Extra Challenge (2)	(England) Ronnie O'Sullivan	Round–Robin
Runner-up	9.	1993	The Masters	(Scotland) Stephen Hendry	5–9
Winner	8.	1993	King's Cup	(Wales) Darren Morgan	8–3
Winner	9.	2003	Euro-Asia Masters Challenge – Event 1	(Republic of Ireland) Ken Doherty	6–4
Runner-up	10.	2007	Euro-Asia Masters Challenge	(Scotland) John Higgins	4–5

=== Pro-am finals: 2 (1 title) ===
Outcome	No.	Year	Championship	Opponent in the final	Score
Runner-up	1.	2007	Asian Indoor Games	(United Arab Emirates) Mohammed Shehab	3–4
Winner	1.	2022	Southeast Asian Games	(Malaysia) Lim Kok Leong	4–2

=== Amateur finals: 7 (5 titles) ===
Outcome	No.	Year	Championship	Opponent in the final	Score
Runner-up	1.	1986	British Under-19 Championship	(England) Barry Pinches	0–3
Winner	1.	1986	Asian Snooker Championship	(Hong Kong) Gary Kwok	8–1
Runner-up	2.	1987	Asian Snooker Championship	(Thailand) Udon Khaimuk	6–8
Winner	2.	1988	Asian Snooker Championship (2)	(Hong Kong) Kenny Kwok	8–7
Winner	3.	1988	World Amateur Championship	(England) Barry Pinches	11–8
Winner	4.	2008	Thailand Amateur Championship	(Thailand) Issara Kachaiwong	5–1
Winner	5.	2009	Asian Snooker Championship (3)	(China) Mei Xiwen	7–3

== See also ==
- World Professional Billiards and Snooker Association
