= 1991 Hong Kong Challenge =

Invitational snooker tournament

Tournament information
- Dates: 28–31 August 1991
- Venue: Hong Kong Hilton
- Country: Hong Kong
- Format: Non-ranking event
- Total prize fund: £72,000
- Winner's share: £20,000
- Highest break: Gary Wilkinson (ENG) (125)

Final
- Champion: Stephen Hendry (SCO)
- Runner-up: James Wattana (THA)
- Score: 9–1

The 1991 Hong Kong Challenge was an invitational non-ranking snooker tournament, which took place from 28 to 31 August 1991 at the Hong Kong Hilton in Hong Kong. Stephen Hendry won the title, defeating James Wattana 9–1 in the final, and received £20,000 prize money, out of a total prize fund of £72,000. Gary Wilkinson compiled the highest break of the tournament, 125, during his quarter-final loss to Steve Davis.

== Results ==
First round Best-of-9 frames
Stephen Hendry (SCO)	5
Kong Yah On (HKG)	0
Dennis Taylor (NIR)	5
Neal Foulds (ENG)	2
Gary Wilkinson (ENG)	5
Terry Griffiths (WAL)	4
Steve Davis (ENG)	5
Stanley Leung (HKG)	0
James Wattana (THA)	5
David Yao (HKG)	4
Steve James (ENG)	5
Mike Hallett (ENG)	2
Jimmy White (ENG)	5
Kenny Kwok (HKG)	0
John Parrott (ENG)	5
Chuchart Trairatanapradit (THA)	2

Quarter-finals; Best-of-9 frames
(Scotland) Stephen Hendry	5
(Northern Ireland) Dennis Taylor	3
(England) Gary Wilkinson	4
(England) Steve Davis	5
(Thailand) James Wattana	5
(England) Steve James	0
(England) Jimmy White	5
(England) John Parrott	2

Semi-finals; Best-of-9 frames
(Scotland) Stephen Hendry	5
(England) Steve Davis	3
(Thailand) James Wattana	5
(England) Jimmy White	2

Final; Best-of-17 frames
(Scotland) Stephen Hendry	9
(Thailand) James Wattana	1
