= Tai Pichit =

Thai snooker player

Personal information
- Born: 10 January 1963 (age 63) Thailand

Sport
- Country: Thailand
- Sport: Snooker
- Professional: 1994–1997, 1998/1999
- Highest ranking: 124 (1998/1999)
- Best ranking finish: Last 16 (x1)

Chuchart Trairatanapradit (Thai: ชูชาติ ไตรรัตนประดิษฐ์), popularly known as Tai Pichit (Thai: ต่าย พิจิตร; born 10 January 1963) is a Thai former professional snooker player.

Pichit participated at the World Snooker Championship three times, reaching the first round in 1995. Pichit's best overall ranking finish was at the 1994 Thailand Open, where he reached the last 16 stage.

== Career ==
At the 1991 Thailand Masters, Tai lost 4–5 in the first round to Allison Fisher. He won the IBSF World Amateur Championship in 1993, defeating Praput Chaithanasakun 11–6 in the final, and turned professional in 1994. At the 1994 Thailand Open he beat Colin Morton 5–2 in the wildcard round and then and Stephen Hendry 5–2, before losing to Darren Morgan 4–5 in the second round.

One year later, he participated at his first World Snooker Championship, qualifying for the 1995 edition of the tournament. Pichit defeated Mark Whatley 5–3, Adrian Rosa 5–1, Mike Dunn 5–2, Warren King 10–0, Stuart Reardon 10–8, Alex Higgins 10–5, Euan Henderson 10–6 and Mike Hallett 10–8 to set up an encounter with Willie Thorne, which he lost 6–10.

He also participated in the 1996 UK Championship, defeating Jimmy White 9–7 in the first round, and advanced to the second round, where he was defeated by Joe Johnson 6–9.

In 1998–99, Pichit was ranked 124th, the highest ranking in his career. However, he ended the season at 150th, which meant that he did not qualify to continue on the professional circuit.

== Personal life ==
Pichit is the father of singer-songwriter and actor Chayatorn Trairattanapradit. Pichit was a Buddhist monk (bhikkhu) before he became a professional snooker player.

== Performance and rankings timeline ==
Tournament	1990/ 91	1991/ 92	1993/ 94	1994/ 95	1995/ 96	1996/ 97	1998/ 99
Ranking (Note: It shows the ranking at the beginning of the season.)	(Note: He was an amateur)			(Note: New players on the Main Tour don't have a ranking)	171	140	
Ranking tournaments
Grand Prix	A	A	A	LQ	LQ	LQ	LQ
UK Championship	A	A	A	LQ	LQ	2R	LQ
Irish Open (Note: The event was called the European Open (1990/1991–1996/1997))	A	A	A	LQ	LQ	LQ	LQ
Welsh Open	A	A	A	LQ	LQ	LQ	LQ
Scottish Open (Note: The event was called the International Open (1993/1994–1996/1997))	Not Held		A	1R	LQ	LQ	LQ
Thailand Masters (Note: The event was called the Asian Open (1990/1991–1991/1992) and the Thailand Open (1993/1994–1996/1997))	A	A	2R	LQ	WD	LQ	LQ
China International	Tournament Not Held						LQ
British Open	A	A	A	LQ	LQ	LQ	LQ
World Championship	A	A	A	1R	LQ	LQ	LQ
Former ranking tournaments
Asian Classic (Note: The event was called the Dubai Classic (1990/1991–1994/1995) and the Thailand Classic (1995/1996))	A	A	A	LQ	WD	LQ	NH
German Masters (Note: The event was called the German Open (1995/1996–1996/1997))	Tournament Not Held				LQ	LQ	NR
Former non-ranking tournaments
Kent Cup	SF	Tournament Not Held					
Thailand Masters	R	1R	Ranking Event				
Hong Kong Challenge	A	1R	Tournament Not Held				
Indian Challenge	NH	1R	Tournament Not Held				

Performance Table Legend
LQ	lost in the qualifying draw	#R	lost in the early rounds of the tournament (WR = Wildcard round, RR = Round robin)	QF	lost in the quarter-finals
SF	lost in the semi-finals	F	lost in the final	W	won the tournament
DNQ	did not qualify for the tournament	A	did not participate in the tournament	WD	withdrew from the tournament

NH / Not Held	means an event was not held.
NR / Non-Ranking Event	means an event is/was no longer a ranking event.
R / Ranking Event	means an event is/was a ranking event.

== Career finals ==
=== Pro-am finals: 2 ===
Outcome	No.	Year	Championship	Opponent in the final	Score	Ref.
Runner-up	1.	1991	Southeast Asian Games	(Thailand) Praput Chaithanasakun	1–5	
Runner-up	2.	1993	Southeast Asian Games (2)	(Thailand) Praput Chaithanasakun	0–5	

=== Amateur finals: 6 (2 titles) ===
Outcome	No.	Year	Championship	Opponent in the final	Score	Ref.
Runner-up	1.	1989	Thailand Amateur Championship	(Thailand) Udon Khaimuk	5–8	
Winner	1.	1991	ACBS Asian Snooker Championship	(India) Yasin Merchant	8–3	
Runner-up	2.	1992	ACBS Asian Snooker Championship	(Thailand) Praput Chaithanasakun	7–8	
Runner-up	3.	1993	ACBS Asian Snooker Championship (2)	(Thailand) Praput Chaithanasakun	5–8	
Winner	2.	1993	World Amateur Championship	(Thailand) Praput Chaithanasakun	11–6	
Runner-up	4.	2010	World Amateur Championship – Masters	(Wales) Philip Williams	4–6	
