= Thailand Masters =

Snooker tournament

Tournament information
- Venue: Grand Hotel
- Location: Hua Hin
- Country: Thailand
- Established: 1983
- Organisation(s): World Professional Billiards and Snooker Association
- Format: Non-ranking event
- Final year: 2006
- Final champion: (Hong Kong) Marco Fu

The Thailand Masters was a professional snooker tournament. Previously known as Asian Open and Thailand Open, it was largely a ranking tournament from 1989 to 2002, with the exception of the 1991 edition which is part of the invitational World Series. The final champion was Marco Fu.

== History ==
The Thailand Masters was first held in the 1983/1984 season. It was organised by Matchroom Sport as part of their World Series and sponsored by Camus, but was abandoned after 1986/1987. The event returned to the calendar in 1989 under the Asian Open name and it became a ranking tournament. In its first three years under this name the event was sponsored by 555 and then by Nescafé in 1993. All events took place in Bangkok, Thailand, except in 1990, which was held in China. In the 1991/1992 season two events were held. The Thailand Masters was part of the World Series and the Asian Open was a ranking event. In 1993 Dave Harold became the lowest ranked player to win a ranking tournament. He was ranked world number 93, when he beat Darren Morgan 9–3.

The event changed its name to Thailand Open in 1993/1994. The event was held in Bangkok and remained there until the 2002/2003 season. It was sponsored by Kloster, before Singha took over for 1995/1996. The event was renamed to the Thailand Masters in the 1997/1998 season and was sponsored by Beer Chang. The only official maximum break in the history of the competition came at the qualifying stages of the 1999 event. Adrian Gunnell compiled it in the first round against Mario Wehrmann. The event didn't have a sponsor again until the 2000/2001 season, when it was sponsored by Blue Eagle and Thai Airways and was sponsored by Singha in 2001/2002. The event lost its ranking status in 2002/2003, after World Snooker decided not to afford a Far East event. The event returned as a domestic event with several players from the Main Tour still competing. The event was last held in the 2006/2007 season with the sponsorship of Sangsom, but was discontinued after that.

== Winners ==
Year	Winner	Runner-up	Final score	Season
Thailand Masters (non-ranking)
1983	(England) Tony Meo	(England) Steve Davis	2–1	1983/84
1984	(England) Jimmy White	(Wales) Terry Griffiths	4–3	1984/85
1985	(Northern Ireland) Dennis Taylor	(Wales) Terry Griffiths	4–3	1985/86
1986	(Thailand) James Wattana	(Wales) Terry Griffiths	2–1	1986/87
Asian Open (ranking)
1989	(Scotland) Stephen Hendry	(Thailand) James Wattana	9–6	1989/90
1990	(Scotland) Stephen Hendry	(Northern Ireland) Dennis Taylor	9–3	1990/91
Thailand Masters (non-ranking)
1991	(England) Steve Davis	(Scotland) Stephen Hendry	6–3	1991/92
Asian Open (ranking)
1992	(England) Steve Davis	(Scotland) Alan McManus	9–3	1991/92
1993	(England) Dave Harold	(Wales) Darren Morgan	9–3	1992/93
Thailand Open (ranking)
1994	(Thailand) James Wattana	(England) Steve Davis	9–7	1993/94
1995	(Thailand) James Wattana	(England) Ronnie O'Sullivan	9–6	1994/95
1996	(Scotland) Alan McManus	(Republic of Ireland) Ken Doherty	9–8	1995/96
1997	(England) Peter Ebdon	(England) Nigel Bond	9–7	1996/97
Thailand Masters (ranking)
1998	(Scotland) Stephen Hendry	(England) John Parrott	9–6	1997/98
1999	(Wales) Mark Williams	(Scotland) Alan McManus	9–7	1998/99
2000	(Wales) Mark Williams	(Scotland) Stephen Hendry	9–5	1999/00
2001	(Republic of Ireland) Ken Doherty	(Scotland) Stephen Hendry	9–3	2000/01
2002	(Wales) Mark Williams	(England) Stephen Lee	9–4	2001/02
Thailand Masters (non-ranking)
2003	(Thailand) Noppadon Noppachorn	(Thailand) Rom Surin	5–4	2002/03
2006	(Hong Kong) Marco Fu	(Thailand) Issara Kachaiwong	5–3	2006/07

== See also ==
- Thailand Classic
- Six-red World Championship, another non-ranking main tour event held in Bangkok
