= 1991–92 snooker season =

Details
- Duration: 30 May 1991 – 31 May 1992
- Tournaments: 28 (10 ranking events)

Triple Crown winners
- UK Championship: (England) John Parrott
- Masters: (Scotland) Stephen Hendry
- World Championship: (Scotland) Stephen Hendry

The 1991–92 snooker season was a series of snooker tournaments played between 30 May 1991 and 31 May 1992. The following table outlines the results for ranking and the invitational events.

== Calendar ==
Date (Note: Dates use the mm-dd date format.)			Rank	Tournament name	Venue	City	Winner	Runner-up	Score	Reference
05–30	06–28	EUR	NR	European Masters League			(England) Steve Davis	(Thailand) James Wattana	(Note: No play-off was held and the title was decided on league table only.)	
07–17	07–18	BEL	NR	European Challenge	Happy European Sports & Business Centre	Waregem	(England) Jimmy White	(England) Steve Davis	4–1	
08–18	08–20	ENG	NR	Pot Black	Trentham Gardens	Stoke-on-Trent	(England) Steve Davis	(Scotland) Stephen Hendry	2–1	
08-??	08-??	THA	NR	Thailand Masters		Bangkok	(England) Steve Davis	(Scotland) Stephen Hendry	6–3	
08–28	08–31	HKG	NR	Hong Kong Challenge	Hilton Hotel	Hong Kong	(Scotland) Stephen Hendry	(Thailand) James Wattana	9–1	
09–04	09–07	IND	NR	Indian Challenge	Taj Mahal Hotel	Delhi	(Scotland) Stephen Hendry	(England) John Parrott	9–5	
09–11	09–15	SCO	NR	Scottish Masters	Civic Centre	Motherwell	(England) Mike Hallett	(England) Steve Davis	10–6	
09–17	09–21	BEL	NR	Belgian Masters		Antwerp	(England) Mike Hallett	(England) Neal Foulds	9–7	
09–18	09–22	ENG	NR	World Seniors Championship	Trentham Gardens	Stoke-on-Trent	(Wales) Cliff Wilson	(Australia) Eddie Charlton	5–4	
10–05	10–11	UAE	WR	Dubai Classic	Al Nasr Stadium	Dubai	(England) John Parrott	(England) Tony Knowles	9–3	
10-14	10-27	ENG	WR	Grand Prix	Hexagon Theatre	Reading	(Scotland) Stephen Hendry	(England) Steve Davis	10–6	
11–02	11–14	SCO	NR	Benson & Hedges Championship	Masters Club	Glasgow	(Republic of Ireland) Ken Doherty	(Wales) Darren Morgan	9–3	
11–15	12–01	ENG	WR	UK Championship	Guild Hall	Preston	(England) John Parrott	(England) Jimmy White	16–13	
12–05	12–14	ENG	NR	World Matchplay	The Dome	Doncaster	(England) Gary Wilkinson	(England) Steve Davis	18–11	
12–18	12–21	BEL	NR	Belgian Challenge	Matchroom Schijnpoort	Antwerp	(England) Steve Davis	(Scotland) Stephen Hendry	10–9	
01-01	01–11	ENG	WR	The Classic	Bournemouth International Centre	Bournemouth	(England) Steve Davis	(Scotland) Stephen Hendry	9–8	
01–14	01–19	THA	WR	Asian Open	The Imperial Hotel	Bangkok	(England) Steve Davis	(Scotland) Alan McManus	9–3	
02-02	02–09	ENG	NR	The Masters	Wembley Conference Centre	London	(Scotland) Stephen Hendry	(England) John Parrott	9–4	
02–10	02–16	WAL	WR	Welsh Open	Newport Centre	Newport	(Scotland) Stephen Hendry	(Wales) Darren Morgan	9–3	
02–17	02–29	ENG	WR	British Open	Assembly Rooms	Derby	(England) Jimmy White	(Thailand) James Wattana	10–7	
03–02	03–07	ENG	WR	Strachan Open	Thornbury Leisure Centre	Bristol	(Thailand) James Wattana	(England) John Parrott	9–5	
03-??	03-??	BEL	NR	European Challenge	Happy European Sports & Business Centre	Waregem	(Scotland) Stephen Hendry	(England) Joe Johnson	4–0	
03–10	03–14	BEL	WR	European Open	Tongeren Snooker Centre	Tongeren	(England) Jimmy White	(England) Mark Johnston-Allen	9–3	
03–31	04–05	IRL	NR	Irish Masters	Goff's	Kill	(Scotland) Stephen Hendry	(Republic of Ireland) Ken Doherty	9–6	
04–18	05–04	ENG	WR	World Snooker Championship	Crucible Theatre	Sheffield	(Scotland) Stephen Hendry	(England) Jimmy White	18–14	
05–09	05–16	WAL	NR	Pontins Professional	Pontins	Prestatyn	(England) Steve James	(England) Neal Foulds	9–8	
05–18	05–21	IRL	NR	Irish Professional Championship	Jury's Hotel	Cork	(Northern Ireland) Joe Swail	(Northern Ireland) Jason Prince	9–1	
01-??	05–31	ENG	NR	Matchroom League	Bournemouth International Centre	Bournemouth	(Scotland) Stephen Hendry	(England) Steve Davis	9–2	

WR = World ranking event
NR = Non-ranking event

== Official rankings ==
The top 16 of the world rankings, these players automatically played in the final rounds of the world ranking events and were invited for the Masters.

No.	Ch.	Name
1	Steady	(Scotland) Stephen Hendry
2	Steady	(England) Steve Davis
3	▲	(England) Jimmy White
4	▼	(England) John Parrott
5	▲	(England) Gary Wilkinson
6	▲	(England) Neal Foulds
7	▲	(England) Steve James
8	▼	(England) Mike Hallett
9	▲	(Northern Ireland) Dennis Taylor
10	▼	(Wales) Doug Mountjoy
11	▼	(Wales) Terry Griffiths
12	▼	(England) Dean Reynolds
13	▲	(Canada) Alain Robidoux
14	▼	(England) Martin Clark
15	▲	(England) Tony Jones
16	▲	(England) Tony Knowles
