= Noppadon Noppachorn =

Thai snooker player

Personal information
- Nickname: Nu Daowadueng
- Born: 24 February 1968 (age 58) Thonburi, Bangkok, Thailand

Sport
- Country: Thailand
- Sport: Snooker
- Professional: 1992–1997, 1999–2002
- Highest ranking: 79 (2000/01)
- Best ranking finish: Last 32 (x4)

Noppadon Noppachorn (Thai: นพดล นภจร; born 24 February 1968) is a former professional snooker player from Thailand who played a number of matches on the world snooker tour between 1992 and 2002.

He played as part of the 1996 Snooker World Cup Thailand team with fellow professionals James Wattana and Tai Pichit.

Noppachorn reached the final 32 at three professional tournaments. At the 1997 Welsh Open Noppachorn defeated David Finbow in the round of 64 before losing to Tony Drago. He reached the last 32 of the 1999 Grand Prix. Qualifying with wins over Sean Storey, and David Gray and then defeating Jamie Burnett 5-2 before losing to second seed Stephen Hendry. Then, at the 2001 Welsh Open his run to the last 32 was ended by future world champion Peter Ebdon.

== Non-ranking finals: 4 (4 titles) ==
- WPBSA Minor Tour – Event 2 – 1995
- Pakistan Masters – 1996
- Thailand Open – 2003
- Thailand Masters – 2003
