= European Masters (snooker) =

European snooker tournament

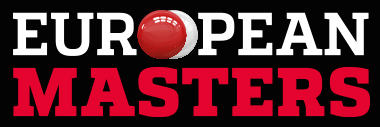

Tournament information
- Country: Various European countries (France, Netherlands, Belgium, Malta, Ireland, Romania, England, Austria, Germany)
- Established: 1989
- Organisation(s): World Snooker Tour
- Format: Ranking event
- Total prize fund: £427,000
- Winner's share: £80,000
- Final year: 2023
- Final champion: Barry Hawkins (ENG)

The European Masters (officially the BetVictor European Masters) was a professional ranking snooker tournament that has been staged periodically since 1989 as the European Open. Between 2005 and 2008 it was known as the Malta Cup and was the sole ranking tournament in Europe outside the British Isles before being discontinued. The event was resurrected in its latest form from 2016 to 2023, when it was being discontinued again along with the wider European Series.

== History ==
Before the 1988/89 season, there were no ranking events outside the United Kingdom. There were, however, many successful invitation events, so the World Professional Billiards and Snooker Association decided to extend the tour with some overseas events. The first two were held in Canada and mainland Europe. The first European event was the European Open in 1988 in Deauville, France, with the sponsorship of ICI. The event then was held at the Palais des Sports in Lyon, France, for 1992 and at the Imax Centre in Rotterdam, Netherlands with the sponsorship of Tulip Computers.

The event was then moved to Belgium. It was held in Tongeren in 1992 and Antwerp between 1993 and 1994 with sponsorship from Humo. The event was moved to the first half of the season in 1993/1994, thus there were two events in 1993, in February and December. The event was moved back to its original place in the calendar in 1995/1996 and took place in Valletta, Malta between 1996 and 1997. The event was held in Tallaght, Ireland in 1998 as the Irish Open. In the 1999/2000 season the Malta Grand Prix was the only continental European ranking event and in 2000/2001 there were none for the first time in 13 seasons.

The European Open was revived in 2001/2002 and was held in Valletta, Malta. In 2003 the event was held in England for the first time (Torquay). The following year it returned to Malta, this time held in Portomaso. The following season event was renamed the Malta Cup. The 2006 event was the first ranking tournament, where no English player reached the quarter-finals. It became an invitation event in 2007/2008, but it was discontinued afterwards.

In 2016, it was announced that the event would be revived under the name European Masters in Romania for the next three years. However, in 2017 it was announced that the tournament would be held in Belgium that year. In 2020, it was held in Milton Keynes, due to the Coronavirus pandemic. The 2022 event will be held at the same venue, after COVID-19 rates in Bavaria prevented it from being held at the Stadthalle in Fürth. The final was traditionally played as a best-of-17 frames match, but for 2022, it was extended to a best-of-19.

There has been five maximum breaks in the history of the tournament. Alain Robidoux made the first in the first qualifying round of the 1989 event against Jim Meadowcroft. The second was Shaun Murphy's fifth official maximum break, which he compiled in the second qualifying round of the 2016 event against Allan Taylor. The third and fourth came at the qualifying stage of the 2022 event. On 16 July, Zhang Anda made a maximum break during his 5–1 win over Anton Kazakov; the following day, Hossein Vafaei made a maximum as he defeated Ng On-yee by the same score. It was the first time either player had made a 147 in professional competition. The most recent maximum break was made by Sean O'Sullivan in the qualifying round of the 2023 event against Barry Hawkins.

== Winners ==
Year	Winner	Runner-up	Final score	Venue	City	Season
European Open (ranking, 1989–1997)
1989	John Parrott (ENG)	Terry Griffiths (WAL)	9–8	Casino de Deauville	Deauville, France	1988/89
1990	John Parrott (ENG)	Stephen Hendry (SCO)	10–6	Palais des Sports	Lyon, France	1989/90
1991	Tony Jones (ENG)	Mark Johnston-Allen (ENG)	9–7	Imax Centre	Rotterdam, Netherlands	1990/91
1992	Jimmy White (ENG)	Mark Johnston-Allen (ENG)	9–3	Tongeren Snooker Centre	Tongeren, Belgium	1991/92
1993 (Feb)	Steve Davis (ENG)	Stephen Hendry (SCO)	10–4	Arenahal	Antwerp, Belgium	1992/93
1993 (Dec)	Stephen Hendry (SCO)	Ronnie O'Sullivan (ENG)	9–5	Arenahal	Antwerp, Belgium	1993/94
1994	Stephen Hendry (SCO)	John Parrott (ENG)	9–3	Schijnpoort Arena	Antwerp, Belgium	1994/95
1996	John Parrott (ENG)	Peter Ebdon (ENG)	9–7	Mediterranean Conference Centre	Valletta, Malta	1995/96
1997	John Higgins (SCO)	John Parrott (ENG)	9–5	Mediterranean Conference Centre	Valletta, Malta	1996/97
Irish Open (ranking, 1998)
1998	Mark Williams (WAL)	Alan McManus (SCO)	9–4	National Basketball Arena	Tallaght, Ireland	1998/99
European Open (ranking, 2001–2004)
2001	Stephen Hendry (SCO)	Joe Perry (ENG)	9–2	Mediterranean Conference Centre	Valletta, Malta	2001/02
2003	Ronnie O'Sullivan (ENG)	Stephen Hendry (SCO)	9–6	Palace Hotel	Torquay, England	2002/03
2004	Stephen Maguire (SCO)	Jimmy White (ENG)	9–3	Hilton Conference Centre	Portomaso, Malta	2003/04
Malta Cup (ranking, 2005–2007)
2005	Stephen Hendry (SCO)	Graeme Dott (SCO)	9–7	Hilton Conference Centre	Portomaso, Malta	2004/05
2006	Ken Doherty (IRL)	John Higgins (SCO)	9–8	Hilton Conference Centre	Portomaso, Malta	2005/06
2007	Shaun Murphy (ENG)	Ryan Day (WAL)	9–4	Hilton Conference Centre	Portomaso, Malta	2006/07
Malta Cup (non-ranking, 2008)
2008	Shaun Murphy (ENG)	Ken Doherty (IRL)	9–3	Hilton Conference Centre	Portomaso, Malta	2007/08
European Masters (ranking, 2016–2023)
2016	Judd Trump (ENG)	Ronnie O'Sullivan (ENG)	9–8	Globus Circus	Bucharest, Romania	2016/17
2017	Judd Trump (ENG)	Stuart Bingham (ENG)	9–7	De Soeverein	Lommel, Belgium	2017/18
2018	Jimmy Robertson (ENG)	Joe Perry (ENG)	9–6	De Soeverein	Lommel, Belgium	2018/19
2020 (Jan)	Neil Robertson (AUS)	Zhou Yuelong (CHN)	9–0	Messe Dornbirn	Dornbirn, Austria	2019/20
2020 (Sep)	Mark Selby (ENG)	Martin Gould (ENG)	9–8	Marshall Arena	Milton Keynes, England	2020/21
2022 (Feb)	Fan Zhengyi (CHN)	Ronnie O'Sullivan (ENG)	10–9	Marshall Arena	Milton Keynes, England	2021/22
2022 (Aug)	Kyren Wilson (ENG)	Barry Hawkins (ENG)	9–3	Stadthalle Fürth	Fürth, Germany	2022/23
2023	Barry Hawkins (ENG)	Judd Trump (ENG)	9–6	Kia Metropol Arena	Nuremberg, Germany	2023/24

== See also ==
- Malta Grand Prix (1994-2001)
- Irish Masters (1975-2007)
- Antwerp Open (2011-2013)
- Rotterdam Open (2013)
- German Masters (1995-)
- Paul Hunter Classic (2004-2019)
