= 2001 Masters (snooker) =

Professional non-ranking snooker tournament, Feb 2001

2001 Benson & Hedges Masters
Tournament information
- Dates: 4–11 February 2001
- Venue: Wembley Conference Centre
- City: London
- Country: England
- Organisation: WPBSA
- Format: Non-ranking event
- Total prize fund: £650,000
- Winner's share: £175,000
- Highest break: Paul Hunter (ENG) (136); Jimmy White (ENG) (136)

Final
- Champion: Paul Hunter (ENG)
- Runner-up: Fergal O'Brien (IRL)
- Score: 10–9

The 2001 Masters (officially the 2001 Benson & Hedges Masters) was a professional invitational snooker tournament held at the Wembley Conference Centre, London, from 4 to 11 February 2001. It was the 27th edition of The Masters, a Triple Crown event and the third of the five World Professional Billiards and Snooker Association (WPBSA) invitational events in the 2000–01 snooker season. It followed the 2000 Scottish Masters and preceded the 2001 Malta Grand Prix. Sponsored by the cigarette company Benson & Hedges, the event had a total prize fund of £650,000, with £175,000 going to the winner.

Matthew Stevens was the tournament's defending champion, but he lost in the second round to Paul Hunter, who went on to reach the final with victories over Peter Ebdon in the quarter-finals and Stephen Hendry in the semi-finals. Hunter's opponent in the final was Fergal O'Brien, who had defeated Dave Harold in his semi-final. Hunter defeated O'Brien 10–9 to win the first of three Masters titles. He and wild card entrant Jimmy White made century breaks of 136, which were the competition's two highest breaks.

== Overview ==
The Masters is an invitational snooker tournament that was first held in 1975; the 2001 competition saw the top-16 players from the snooker world rankings play and a sponsors' selection entrant and the Benson and Hedges Championship victor invited to participate as wild cards. It is one of the three Triple Crown events in the game of snooker, the others being the World Snooker Championship and the UK Championship, but it is not an official ranking tournament. The 2001 Masters was its 27th staging, and the third of the five invitational events in the 2000–01 snooker season, following the 2000 Scottish Masters and preceding the 2001 Malta Grand Prix. It occurred from 4 to 11 February 2001, at the Wembley Conference Centre, London.

Sponsored by the tobacco company Benson & Hedges and organised by the World Professional Billiards and Snooker Association, it had a total prize fund of £650,000, with £175,000 going to the winner; the host broadcaster was the BBC. All games were played as best-of-11 frames, except for the final which was the best-of-19 frames. Bookmakers made Mark Williams, the world champion, the favourite to win. Stephen Hendry, the winner of 32 ranking titles, commented, "In my last four tournaments, I've had two semis, a quarter and a final. Although that's quite steady, it's nowhere near what I expect of myself. Anything less than winning the tournament is a failure. There's still room for a lot of improvement."

=== Prize fund ===
The breakdown of prize money for the 2001 tournament is listed below.

- Winner: £175,000
- Runner-up: £88,000
- Semi-finals: £45,000
- Quarter-finals: £30,000
- Highest break: £20,000
- Maximum break: £80,000 sports car
- Total: £650,000

== Tournament summary ==
=== Qualifying ===
The Benson and Hedges Championship held at the Willie Thorne Snooker Centre, Malvern from 5 to 16 November 2000, determined one qualifier for the Masters' main draw. Entry was limited to any professional on the World Snooker Tour with a world ranking lower than 16th. The winner earned £5,000 prize money with the runner-up receiving £3,000. Shaun Murphy defeated Andrew Atkinson, Gary Ponting, Hugh Abernethy, Ali Carter, Nick Walker, Ryan Day and Mark Davis to reach the final where he played Stuart Bingham, who beat Colm Gilcreest, Barry Cox, Craig Harrison, Sean Storey, Gary Wilkinson and Andy Hicks. Murphy came from 5–2 behind to defeat Bingham 9–7 and qualify for the Masters. At 18 years old, Murphy was one of the youngest champions in tournament history. David McLellan achieved his first maximum break, the second of the season, and the 40th in professional snooker in the last frame of his second round match with Steve Meakin.

=== Round 1 ===
The first round, in which the two wild cards and those ranked 15th and 16th participated, took place on 4 February. Murphy, a former United Kingdom Under-15 title winner, made breaks of 113, 102 and 84 from frames two to four to beat world number 15 Marco Fu 6–1 but failed to become the first player to achieve three century breaks in a row at the Masters when he could not pot a green ball in the fourth frame. Jimmy White, the world number 18 whose wild card allowed him to enter the Masters for the 20th time, took 85 minutes to defeat Joe Swail 6–1, which included a total clearance of 136 in frame seven.

=== Round 2 ===
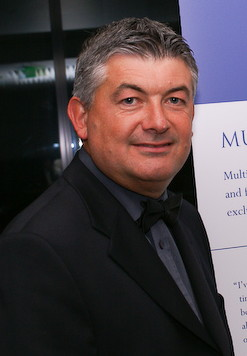
John Parrott achieved his first victory in the UK since the 2000 World Championship in the second round of the tournament

The second round matches from 4 to 7 February featured the two first round winners and participants ranked 1st to 14th. The tournament's reigning champion Matthew Stevens led the 2001 Welsh Open runner-up Paul Hunter 2–0 and then 5–4 before a break of 74 from Hunter forced a final frame decider. Hunter secured the 42-minute final frame for a 6–5 victory to end a match that lasted almost three hours and earn his first win at the arena. World number 13 Dave Harold overturned a 2–1 deficit to world number one John Higgins with breaks of 86. 55, 52, 67 and 71 to win by 6–3 and win for the first time at the Masters in three attempts. Hendry, six-time Masters champion, faced Murphy. He won the first frame on a 99 clearance before Murphy took four frames in succession to lead 4–1. Hendry made breaks of 94, 56, 78 and 71 for five frames in a row and a 6–4 victory; Murphy compiled 15 points in that time. The 1995 semi-finalist Peter Ebdon took 3 hours and 40 minutes and made breaks of 135 and 104 in beating Alan McManus 6–4.

John Parrott, a three-time Masters runner-up, played the world number five Stephen Lee. Breaks of 88 and 109 gave Lee a 3–1 lead before Parrott drew level at 4–4. The following two frames were shared, forcing a final frame decider. Parrott took the half-hour final frame to win 6–5 in his first UK victory since the first round of the 2000 World Snooker Championship. Parrott quipped the game could be broadcast on the BBC's A Question of Sport, "What happened next – John Parrott won a snooker match." There were 2,374 spectators watching Ronnie O'Sullivan play White, the largest crowd for a non-final Masters game in 18 years. O'Sullivan won frame one on a 101 break before White took the next five frames to be within one of victory. O'Sullivan took frame seven before White's 117 clearance gave him a 6–2 win. Post-match, O'Sullivan questioned whether he had the temperament to continue playing snooker. Fergal O'Brien made breaks of 54, 88, 102, 99 and 53 to defeat Williams 6–5, and Ken Doherty beat Anthony Hamilton 6–1 with breaks of 52, 107, 51, 47 and 48; Hamilton compiled a 119 break in the third frame.

=== Quarter-finals ===
All four quarter-finals were held between 8 and 9 February. The first quarter-final was between Ebdon and Hunter. Ebdon won the first frame and Hunter the second and third in 43 minutes. Ebdon took frames four and five before Hunter equalled the score at 3–3 in frame six. Hunter came from 50–0 behind to win frame seven on the black ball and completed a 6–3 win with breaks of 70 and 44. Post-match, Hunter said he had to maintain his concentration since Ebdon was playing slower than normal. Harold played Parrott in the second quarter-final. Harold won frame one with a break of 114 before Parrott took five frames in succession to lead 5–1. Harold won the next four frames, and forced a final frame decider that ended on a re-spotted black after his clearance levelled the score at 56–56. After seven shots were played, Harold potted the black ball to win 6–5. Harold called it "one of the best wins of my career", while Parrott admitted blame for losing, "I had enough chances to sink a battleship but the vital ball just kept scuppering me."

The third quarter-final featured Hendry and White. Security staff was increased by 50 per cent for the game because of White's support. Two people from the crowd of 1,649 were removed from the arena by security staff. Some spectators made sounds as Hendry was playing. Alan Chamberlain, the match referee, sought to maintain order, and White asked for all the interrupters to be ejected. Ahead 3–1, White left a red ball on the edge of one of the centre pockets, allowing Hendry to make a 45 clearance for frame four. He took the lead with a 113 century break, the 519th of his professional career, in frame seven, and won two of the next three frames to win 6–4. Doherty and O'Brien played the last quarter-final. O'Brien won the first three frames on breaks of 84, 58 and 61 as Doherty complied four points in response. O'Brien took frame four before sharing the next three frames until he won the match 6–2 in frame eight after Doherty missed the brown ball.

=== Semi-finals ===
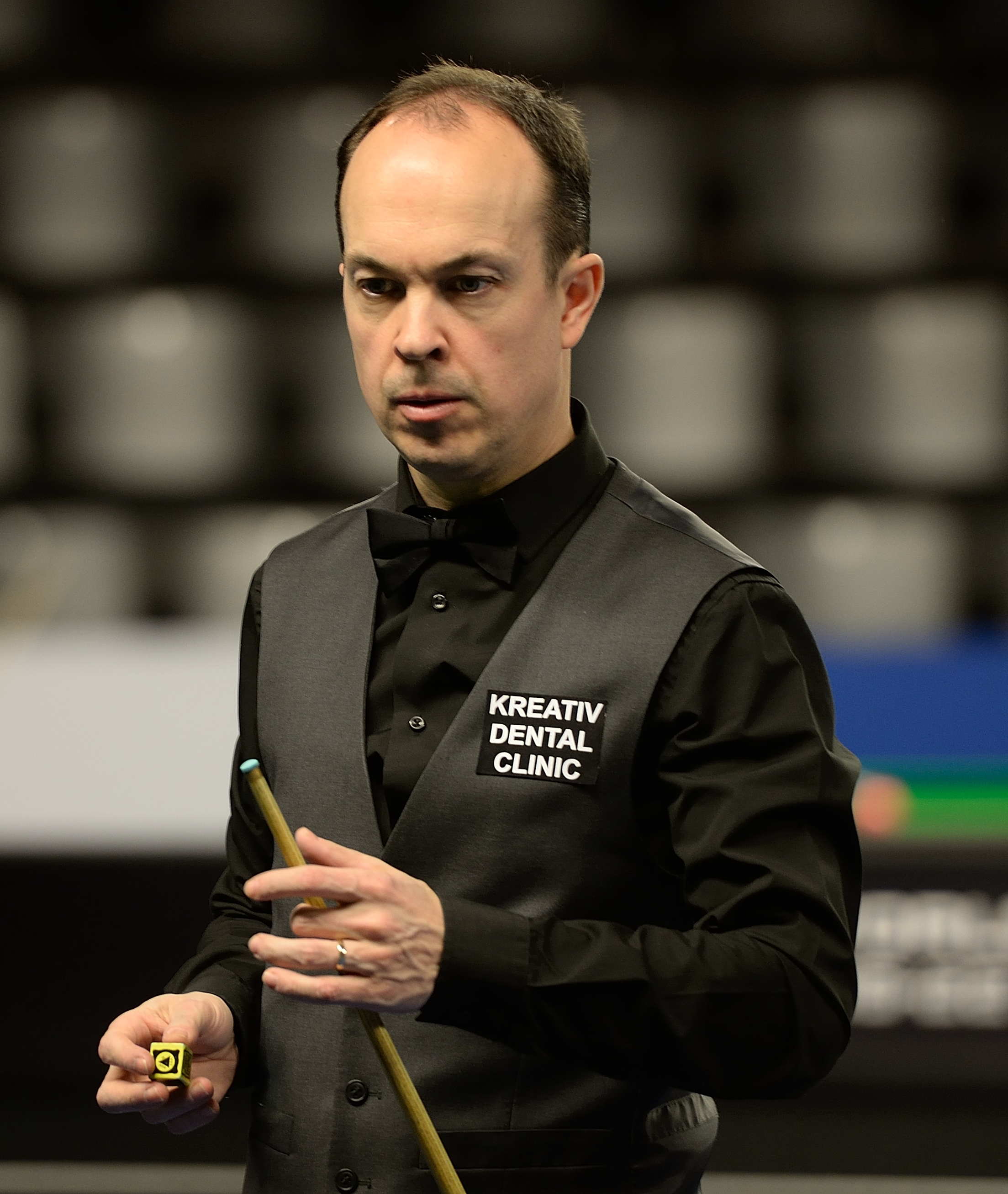
Fergal O'Brien reached the final, beating Dave Harold in the semi-finals.

Both of the semi-finals occurred on 10 February. The first-semi-final was between Hendry and Hunter. The match was tied at 3–3; Hunter made a 101 century break in frame four and a 99 break in the fifth. Hunter won frame seven and Hendry the eighth. Hunter took the lead with breaks of 60 and 65 in frame nine won him and then secured the match 6–4 on a fluked green to the centre pocket and a clearance up to the pink ball. Hunter said that defeating Hendry in the arena "has to be the best result I have ever achieved". He was aware the latter was missing long-distance pots. "Stephen had a couple of decent breaks so it was important I did as well just to show him how well I was playing. I thought I would be nervous at the end but I was totally relaxed." Hendry commented Hunter was better that day but felt he could have won had he potted a quarter of the long-range shots he played, adding, "It's disappointing to lose any match anywhere and this is no exception. I hate losing and I always will."

The other semi-final was between Harold and O'Brien. A break of 97 won O'Brien frame one and Harold took the second on a 116 break. On both sides of the mid-session interval, O'Brien won four frames in a row to lead 5–1. Harold won the next three frames to be 5–4 behind. In frame ten, O'Brien exchanged multiple safety shots before winning the frame and the match 6–4 on the black ball to advance to the final. Post-match, O'Brien said: "It was a big battle. The pressure was beginning to build towards the end and I could see it slipping away. I was fortunate to be 5–1 up after not really dominating the match but it's a great win for me." Harold commented, "I left myself with a little too much to do. It was a bridge too far. You can do that kind of thing once but doing it again is too much to ask."

=== Final ===
The final between Hunter and O'Brien was played as the best-of-19 frames over two sessions before 2,483 spectators on 11 February. When Hunter missed the pink in the first frame, O'Brien won it after half an hour and took the second following Hunter's miss on the blue ball. Hunter won his first frame in the third before a break of 80 from O'Brien earned him frame four going into the interval. O'Brien took frames five and six after errors by Hunter, but Hunter won frame seven on a break of 52. The eighth frame which lasted 38 minutes, saw O'Brien lead Hunter 6–2 at the conclusion of the first session after Hunter fouled by potting the black while playing a shot on the brown.

On resumption of the match, O'Brien made a break of 49 after Hunter missed a red ball in the centre, but a 52 clearance completed on the black ball by Hunter won him the ninth frame. O'Brien took frame 10 before Hunter won the next three frames to draw within a frame of his opponent; Hunter made clearances of 129 and 133 in frames 12 and 13. A break of 88 in frame 14 allowed O'Brien to restore a two-frame lead at 8–6. Hunter won the next three frames without reply to lead for the first time at 9–8; he equalled White when he made his highest clearance of 136 in frame 16 and made a 132 clearance in frame 17. In the 18th frame, O'Brien came from 44 points behind to force a final frame decider on a clearance from the last red up to the pink. Hunter fouled twice in attempting to escape from snookers, allowing O'Brien to nominate the green as his free ball, before missing the blue ball. Hunter made a clearance from the brown to the pink to win the 46-minute frame 77–44 and the match 10–9.

It was the first of three Masters victories for Hunter; he won it twice more, in 2002 and 2004. He earned £175,000 prize money for winning the competition, which was his first major victory since the 1998 Welsh Open. He commented on the success, "To add my name to this trophy is a dream come true. I perhaps haven't fulfilled my potential but I'm only 22 and hopefully there are a lot more titles left in me." O'Brien said he was disappointed to have missed a red ball in frame 11 for a possible 8–3 lead, which he felt lost him the chance to win the Masters, adding, "It's disappointing to lose like I did but I've had a great week and beaten some fantastic players. I was a little tired but that's not an excuse. But I'll replay some of those misses in the last frame for some time to come."

== Main draw ==
=== First round ===
Numbers given in brackets after players names show the competition's 15th and 16th seeds. Players in bold indicate match winners.

Match	Date		Score	
WC1	4 February	Marco Fu (HKG) (15)	1–**6**	**Shaun Murphy** (ENG)
WC2	4 February	Joe Swail (NIR) (16)	1–**6**	**Jimmy White** (ENG)

=== Second round to final ===
Numbers to the left of players' names show the tournament seedings. Players in bold denote match winners.

Last 16; Best of 11 frames
1	Matthew Stevens (WAL)	5
14	**Paul Hunter** (ENG)	**6**
8	Alan McManus (SCO)	4
12	**Peter Ebdon** (ENG)	**6**
5	Ronnie O'Sullivan (ENG)	2
**Jimmy White** (ENG)	**6**
4	**Stephen Hendry** (SCO)	**6**
Shaun Murphy (ENG)	4
3	John Higgins (SCO)	3
13	**Dave Harold** (ENG)	**6**
6	Stephen Lee (ENG)	5
10	**John Parrott** (ENG)	**6**
7	**Ken Doherty** (IRL)	**6**
11	Anthony Hamilton (ENG)	1
2	Mark Williams (WAL)	5
9	**Fergal O'Brien** (IRL)	**6**

Quarter-finals; Best of 11 frames
14	(England) **Paul Hunter**	**6**
12	(England) Peter Ebdon	3
(England) Jimmy White	4
4	(Scotland) **Stephen Hendry**	**6**
13	(England) **Dave Harold**	**6**
10	(England) John Parrott	5
7	(Republic of Ireland) Ken Doherty	2
9	(Republic of Ireland) **Fergal O'Brien**	**6**

Semi-finals; Best of 11 frames
14	(England) **Paul Hunter**	**6**
4	(Scotland) Stephen Hendry	4
13	(England) Dave Harold	4
9	(Republic of Ireland) **Fergal O'Brien**	**6**

Final; Best of 19 frames
14	(England) **Paul Hunter**	**10**
9	(Republic of Ireland) Fergal O'Brien	9

== Final ==
The bold text in the table indicate winning frame scores and the winning player. Breaks over 50 are indicated in brackets.

Final: Best of 19 frames. Referee: Jan Verhaas; Wembley Conference Centre, London, England, 11 February 2001.
Paul Hunter (14); England	10–9	Fergal O'Brien (9); Ireland
Afternoon: 40–59, 57–68, 67–44, 48–80 (80), 30–72, 56–71, 78–0 (51), 34–64; Evening: 61–53 (Hunter 52), 54–57, 51–43, 133–6 (129), 136–0 (101), 0–88 (88), 104–0 (75), 136–0 (136), 132–0 (132), 44–62, 77–44
136	Highest break	88
4	Century breaks	0
7	50+ breaks	2

== Qualifying ==
Players highlighted in bold are the winners of the Benson and Hedges Tournament from the quarter-finals to the final.

Quarter-finals; Best of 9 frames
**Shaun Murphy** (ENG)	**5**
Ryan Day (WAL)	2
**Mark Davis** (ENG)	**5**
Lee Spick (ENG)	2
**Andy Hicks** (ENG)	**5**
David Gray (ENG)	4
**Stuart Bingham** (ENG)	**5**
Gary Wilkinson (ENG)	4

Semi-finals; Best of 11 frames
(England) **Shaun Murphy**	**6**
(England) Mark Davis	1
(England) **Stuart Bingham**	**6**
(England) Andy Hicks	2

Final; Best of 17 frames
(England) **Shaun Murphy**	**9**
(England) Stuart Bingham	7

== Century breaks ==
The main stage of the 2001 Masters saw 11 players achieve a total of 19 century breaks. The competition's two highest breaks were a pair of 136s compiled by both Hunter in the 16th frame of the final with O'Brien and by White in the final frame of his first round match with Fu. Both players shared the £20,000 highest break prize.

- 136, 132, 129, 101, 101 – Paul Hunter
- 136, 117 – Jimmy White
- 135, 104 – Peter Ebdon
- 119 – Anthony Hamilton
- 116, 114 – Dave Harold
- 113, 102 – Shaun Murphy
- 113 – Stephen Hendry
- 109 – Stephen Lee
- 107 – Ken Doherty
- 102 – Fergal O'Brien
- 101 – Ronnie O'Sullivan
