= 2002 Welsh Open (snooker) =

2002 Regal Welsh Open
Tournament information
- Dates: 23–27 January 2002
- Venue: Cardiff International Arena
- City: Cardiff
- Country: Wales
- Organisation: WPBSA
- Format: Ranking event
- Total prize fund: £597,200
- Winner's share: £82,500
- Highest break: Paul Hunter (ENG) (141)

Final
- Champion: Paul Hunter (ENG)
- Runner-up: Ken Doherty (IRL)
- Score: 9–7

The 2002 Welsh Open (officially the 2002 Regal Welsh Open) was a professional ranking snooker tournament that took place between 23 and 27 January 2002 at the Cardiff International Arena in Cardiff, Wales.

Paul Hunter defeated Ken Doherty 9–7 in the final to win his second ranking title. The final was a repeat of the previous year's tournament in which Ken Doherty defeated Paul Hunter 9–2.

== Tournament summary ==
Defending champion Ken Doherty was the number 1 seed with World Champion Ronnie O'Sullivan seeded 2. The remaining places were allocated to players based on the world rankings.

== Main draw ==
Round 1 Best of 9 frames
1	(Republic of Ireland) Ken Doherty	5
32	(Thailand) James Wattana	2
12	(Scotland) Alan McManus	0
27	(England) Joe Perry	5
16	(Republic of Ireland) Fergal O'Brien	5
41	(Scotland) Marcus Campbell	2
6	(Wales) Matthew Stevens	5
31	(Wales) Anthony Davies	1
5	(Scotland) Stephen Hendry	5
21	(England) Steve Davis	1
11	(England) Jimmy White	5
29	(Malta) Tony Drago	4
13	(England) Mark King	5
64	(England) Rod Lawler	2
4	(Scotland) John Higgins	5
61	(England) Ali Carter	0
3	(Wales) Mark Williams	5
(England) Barry Pinches	3
14	(Scotland) Graeme Dott	5
(England) Rory McLeod	3
10	(Northern Ireland) Joe Swail	5
95	(England) Mark Selby	1
8	(England) Stephen Lee	4
33	(England) Brian Morgan	5
7	(England) Peter Ebdon	5
24	(Scotland) Chris Small	2
15	(England) Dave Harold	3
36	(Scotland) Jamie Burnett	5
9	(England) Paul Hunter	5
38	(England) Alfie Burden	3
2	(England) Ronnie O'Sullivan	5
48	(England) Ian McCulloch	4

Last 16; Best of 9 frames
1	(Republic of Ireland) Ken Doherty	5
27	(England) Joe Perry	0
16	(Republic of Ireland) Fergal O'Brien	5
6	(Wales) Matthew Stevens	0
5	(Scotland) Stephen Hendry	5
11	(England) Jimmy White	1
13	(England) Mark King	3
4	(Scotland) John Higgins	5
3	(Wales) Mark Williams	1
14	(Scotland) Graeme Dott	5
10	(Northern Ireland) Joe Swail	5
33	(England) Brian Morgan	0
7	(England) Peter Ebdon	5
36	(Scotland) Jamie Burnett	0
9	(England) Paul Hunter	5
2	(England) Ronnie O'Sullivan	4

Quarter Final; Best of 9 frames
1	(Republic of Ireland) Ken Doherty	5
16	(Republic of Ireland) Fergal O'Brien	3
5	(Scotland) Stephen Hendry	5
4	(Scotland) John Higgins	2
14	(Scotland) Graeme Dott	5
10	(Northern Ireland) Joe Swail	0
7	(England) Peter Ebdon	4
9	(England) Paul Hunter	5

Semi Final; Best of 11 frames
1	(Republic of Ireland) Ken Doherty	6
5	(Scotland) Stephen Hendry	4
14	(Scotland) Graeme Dott	3
9	(England) Paul Hunter	6

Final; Best of 17 frames
1	(Republic of Ireland) Ken Doherty	7
9	(England) Paul Hunter	9

== Final ==
Final: Best of 17 frames. Referee: Paul Collier. Cardiff International Arena, Cardiff, Wales, 27 January 2002.
Ken Doherty (1); Ireland	7–9	Paul Hunter (9); England
Afternoon: 115–0 (75), 14–68, 15–72 (72), 29–67, 5–63 (62), 0–141 (141), 65–21 (56), 66–62 (Doherty 59); Evening: 0–89, 68–54 (Hunter 54), 19–68, 89–31 (52), 70–29, 0–68, 87–63, 24–77 (76)
75	Highest break	141
0	Century breaks	1
4	50+ breaks	5
