= 2002 Masters (snooker) =

Professional non-ranking snooker tournament, Feb 2002

2002 Benson & Hedges Masters
Tournament information
- Dates: 3–10 February 2002
- Venue: Wembley Conference Centre
- City: London
- Country: England
- Organisation: WPBSA
- Format: Non-ranking event
- Total prize fund: £695,000
- Winner's share: £190,000
- Highest break: Ronnie O'Sullivan (ENG) (138)

Final
- Champion: Paul Hunter (ENG)
- Runner-up: Mark Williams (WAL)
- Score: 10–9

The 2002 Masters (officially the 2002 Benson & Hedges Masters) was a professional invitational snooker tournament held at the Wembley Conference Centre, London from 3 to 10 February 2002. It was the 28th edition of The Masters, a Triple Crown event, and the penultimate invitational event in the 2001–02 snooker season. It followed the 2001 Scottish Masters and preceded the 2002 Irish Masters. Sponsored by the cigarette company Benson & Hedges, the event featured the top 16 from the snooker world rankings and two wild cards. The competition had a total prize fund of £650,000, with £175,000 going to the winner.

Paul Hunter was the tournament's defending champion and qualified for the final with victories over Stephen Lee, Peter Ebdon and Alan McManus in the preceding rounds as Mark Williams reached the same stage by defeating Mark King, Stephen Hendry and Jimmy White. Hunter defeated Williams 10–9 to win the second of three Masters titles. Ronnie O'Sullivan compiled the tournament's highest break, a 138 total clearance, in the fourth frame of his first round match with Joe Swail.

== Overview ==
The Masters is an invitational snooker tournament that was first held in 1975; the top-16 players from the snooker world rankings as well as a sponsors' selection entrant and the Benson and Hedges Championship victor invited to participate as wild cards for the 2002 competition. It is one of the three Triple Crown events in the game of snooker; the others being the World Snooker Championship and the UK Championship, but it is not a ranking tournament. As an invitational event, it carried no world ranking points. The 2002 Masters was its 28th staging, and the penultimate World Professional Billiards and Snooker Association (WPBSA) invitational event of the 2001–02 season, following the 2001 Scottish Masters and preceding the 2002 Irish Masters. It was held from 3 to 10 February 2002, at the Wembley Conference Centre, London, England.

Sponsored by the tobacco company Benson & Hedges, it had a total prize fund of £695,000, with £190,000 going to the winner, and the host broadcaster was the BBC. Every match was played as best-of-11 frames, except for the final which was the best-of-19 frames. World champion Ronnie O'Sullivan was installed as the favourite by bookmakers to win the tournament. Stephen Hendry, the six-times Masters champion, commented on his prospects of a seventh title: "There is no doubt that this is one of the most difficult tournaments to win. For the players it is second only to the Embassy [World Snooker Championship] in terms of prestige. But I feel I have certainly got as good a chance as anybody."

=== Prize fund ===
The breakdown of prize money for the 2002 Masters is shown below:

- Winner: £190,000
- Runner-up: £95,000
- Semi-finals: £47,500
- Quarter-finals: £37,000
- Second round: £18,000
- First round: £11,000
- Highest break: £21,000
- Total: £695,000

== Tournament summary ==
=== Qualifying ===
The Benson and Hedges Championship held at the Towers Snooker Club, Mansfield from 4 to 15 November 2001 determined a wild card qualifier for the Masters. Players ranked outside the top 16 in the world rankings were allowed to enter. Ryan Day qualified for the final with victories over Steven Bennie, Drew Henry, Paul Davies, Stuart Bingham, Ian McCulloch, Lee Walker and Sean Storey, where he played Hugh Abernethy, who defeated Ian Sargeant, Dominic Dale, Nick Dyson, Anthony Davies, Mark Gray and Shaun Murphy. Day became the competition's first Welsh winner since 1995 when he beat Abernethy 9–5 to enter the Masters and won £5,000 prize money for winning. Murphy compiled a maximum break in frame two of his 5–2 Last 32 win over Adrian Rosa, the second of his career, the second of the season, the fourth in tournament history and the 44th overall. (Note: The three preceding maximum breaks in the Benson and Hedges Championship were made by Terry Murphy, Karl Burrows and David McLellan.) At 19 years and 3 months, Murphy was the second youngest player to achieve a maximum break in professional snooker.

=== Round 1 ===
The first round, in which the two wild cards and those ranked 15th and 16th participated, took place from 3 to 4 February. Fergal O'Brien, the 2001 runner-up, overturned a 2–5 deficit to the sponsor's wild card selection Steve Davis and took the final four frames to win 6–5 with a match-high break of 97. Day, playing with a different cue stick after leaving his old one on a train returning from an event in Glasgow, beat world number 15 Dave Harold 6–3 in his Masters debut following a clearance from the brown ball to the pink ball in frame seven.

=== Round 2 ===
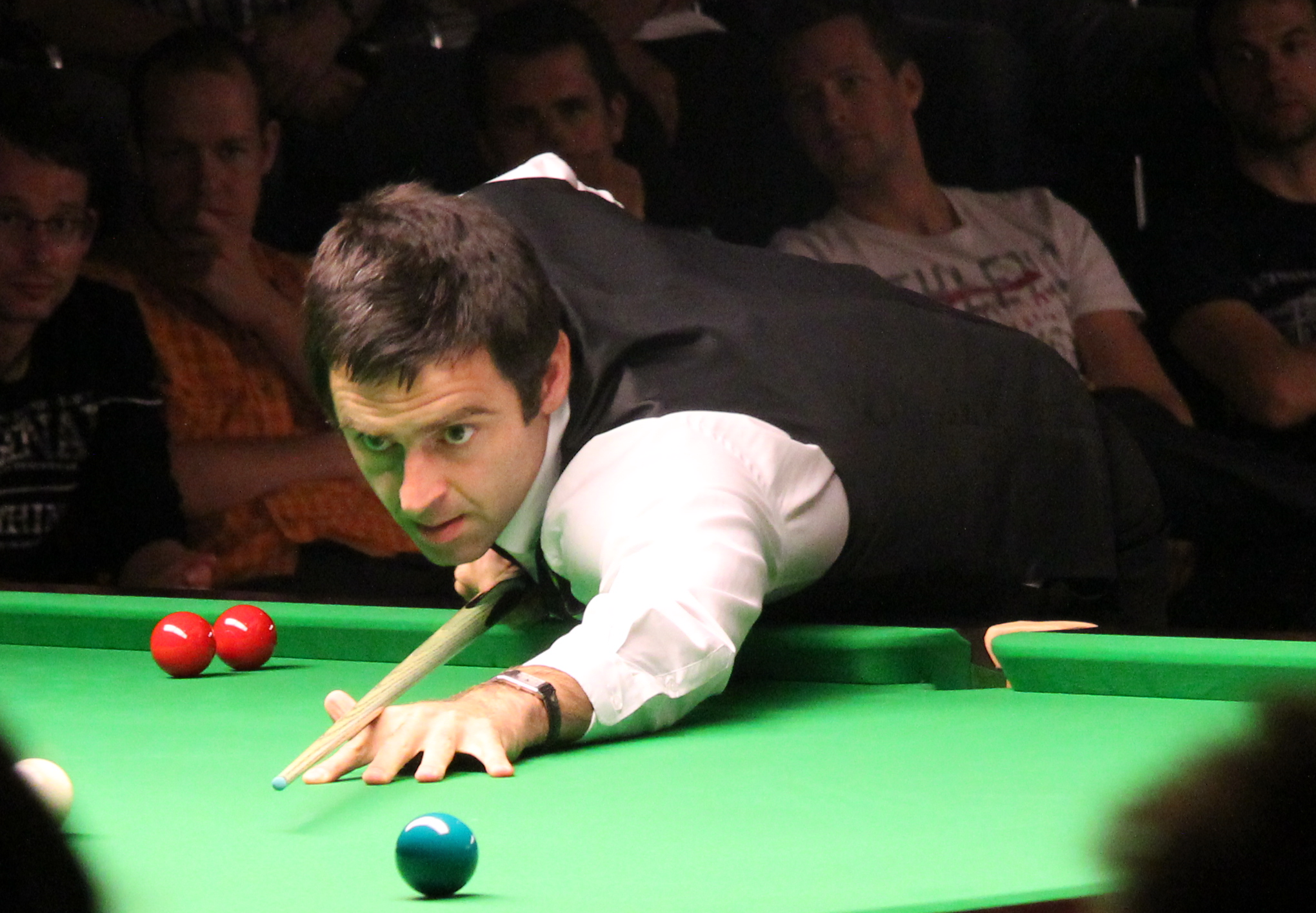
Ronnie O'Sullivan compiled the tournament's highest break of 138 in the second round.

Both of the first round winners played and those ranked 1st to 14 played in the second round held from 3 to 6 February. Paul Hunter, the reigning Masters winner, came from 2–3 behind the 2001 LG Cup victor Stephen Lee to win 6–3 with breaks of 101, 69 and 69; Lee accumulated 32 points in the last four frames. John Higgins, the 1999 Masters champion, lost the first two frames to fellow Scot Alan McManus but won the next four to lead 4–2. McManus went 5–4 ahead with breaks of 50 and 102 before Higgins' 78 break in frame ten forced a final frame decider. McManus won the final frame on the brown for a 6–5 victory after Higgins went in-off the brown trying to escape from a snooker. Higgins did not attend the compulsory press conference because he was upset with his form. 1984 Masters winner Jimmy White led Matthew Stevens 5–0 before the latter stopped a whitewash with a 73 break in frame six. White won frame seven and the match 6–1 with breaks of 32 and 36 overturning Stevens' 53–0 lead in that frame. O'Brien played two-time Masters runner-up Ken Doherty, with O'Brien leading 4–0 before Doherty won three frames in a row to be 4–3 behind. O'Brien claimed frames eight and nine to win 6–5.

Hendry took 138 minutes to whitewash Day 6–0 with breaks of 89, 60, 103, 91 and 84 and accumulated 572 points to Day's 120. Asked whether he was sympathetic to Day, Hendry replied, "Why? Marcus Campbell didn't feel sorry for me. You just want to destroy an opponent. That's how it's always been with me." World number 7 Peter Ebdon came from 1–4 behind world number 14 and tournament debutant Graeme Dott to produce breaks of 124 and 84 in claiming five frames in succession and winning 6–4 in 3 hours and 56 minutes. 1998 Masters champion Mark Williams took 1 hour and 53 minutes to defeat world number 13 Mark King 6–1, including a clearance of 127 in the fourth frame and breaks of 58, 40 and 48; King stopped a whitewash by winning frame two on 55 break. O'Sullivan played Joe Swail in the last first round match. Tied at 1–1, O'Sullivan produced a break of 50 in frame three and a 138 total clearance in frame four to lead 3–1. Swail claimed the following two frames to tie at 3–3, including a 109 century break in frame six. O'Sullivan made breaks of 87, 77 and 108 to win the match 6–3, compiling 284 points to Swail's 11 in that time.

=== Quarter-finals ===
The quarter-finals were held on 7 and 8 February. The first quarter-final was between McManus and O'Brien. Trailing 2–0, O'Brien won four frames in a row to lead McManus 4–2 as he had the match-high break of 59. McManus went on to win four frames in succession to win by 6–4 in a match lasting 4 hours and 12 minutes. Both players commented they had sub-par performances during the match. Ebdon and Hunter played the second quarter-final. Hunter led 3–1 with a break of 54 and a century break of 105 in the fourth frame but the match was required to conclude with a final frame decider as both players shared the next five frames. A break of 80 from Hunter in the final frame gave him a 6–5 win. Hunter said he had the knowledge that he would play Ebdon for a long period of time, adding: "I played well to go 3–1 up and I scored well when I was in the balls all night. I knew he would come back at me but I just concentrated on playing the balls as they were."

O'Sullivan and White contested the third quarter-final. A crowd of 2,403 people observed the play, the record for a non-final Masters game. O'Sullivan led 3–1 with breaks of 51 and 50, extending it to 5–2 by winning three of the next four frames. White went 5–4 behind following errors in O'Sullivan's play; he came from 35 points behind the latter who went in-off on that score to compile a 72 clearance in frame ten and force a final frame decider. O'Sullivan led the final frame 49–19 but a missed safety shot on the red allowed White to achieve a clearance ending on the blue ball and win the match 6–5. O'Sullivan commented he was quite angry because he lost a game he felt he could have won, "It's disappointing. The wheels have come off though there is nothing wrong with my game, it's just something I have got to deal with mentally and it's not something I want to air in the press." The last quarter-final was played by Hendry and Williams. After five frames, Hendry was 3–2 ahead with breaks of 70 and 85 before Williams levelled at 3–3. Hendry retook the lead with a break of 79 in frame seven before Williams took the next three with breaks of 80 and 50 to win 6–4.

=== Semi-finals ===
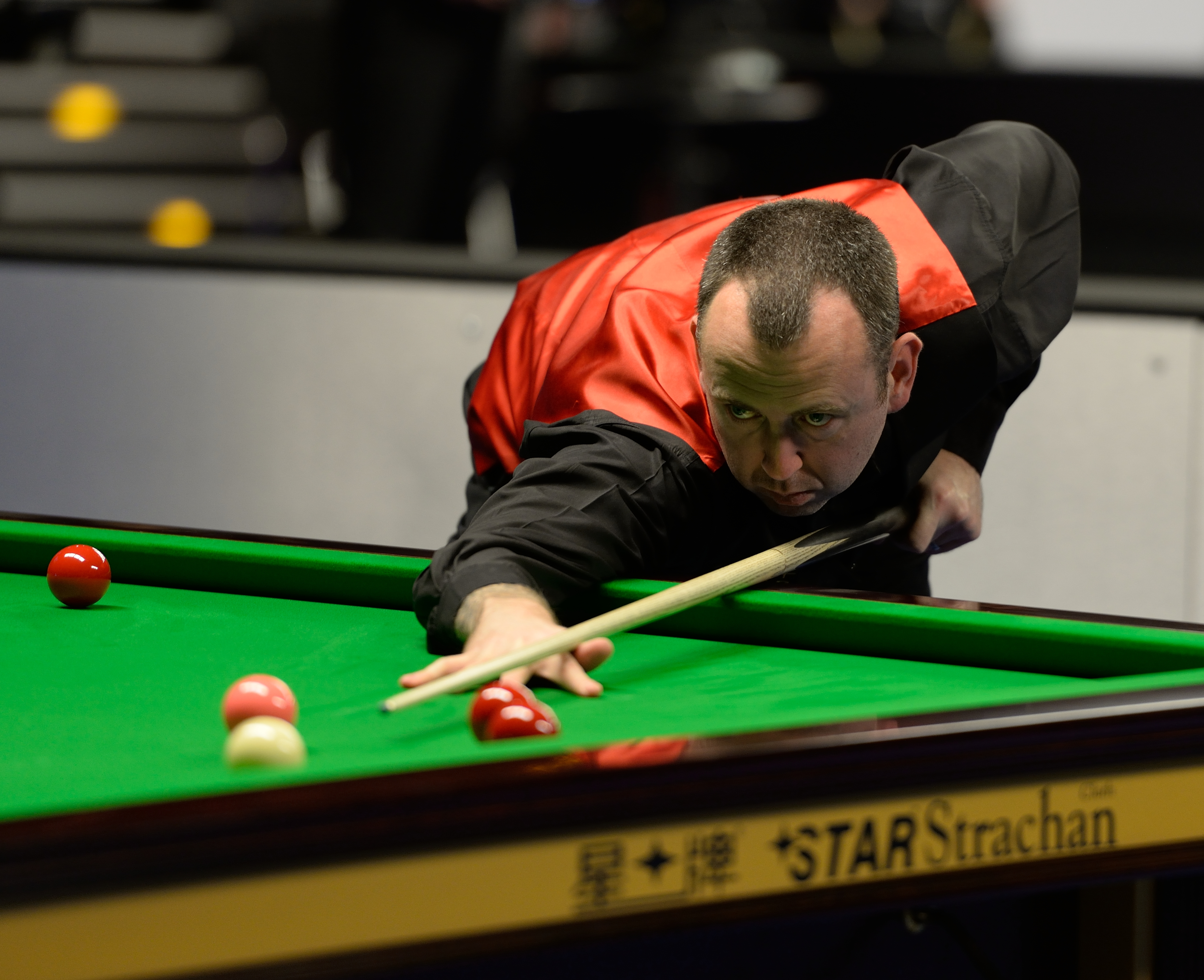
Mark Williams qualified for the final but lost 10–9 to Paul Hunter.

Both of the semi-finals occurred on 9 February. The first semi-final was contested by Hunter and McManus. Ahead 2–1, Hunter failed to pot the pink to win the fourth frame, allowing McManus to achieve a clearance from the 14th red to the black to tie at 2–2. McManus made breaks of 56 and 98 to go two frames ahead before Hunter took the next three frames to lead 5–4. The tenth frame was secured by McManus to require a final frame decider won by Hunter with a break of 36 for a 6–5 victory. It was McManus' 34th career semi-final and did not advance to the final of a competition for the first time since the 1999 Thailand Masters. Hunter said he was happy to qualify for the final because McManus was a decent participant. McManus said would not dwell over his defeat and wished Hunter the best of luck for the final.

White and Williams played the other semi-final. A break of 78 won White the first frame while Williams took the next three with breaks on 51, 93 and 102 to go 3–1 ahead. White claimed frame five as Williams took the sixth and then the seventh on a clearance of 133 to be within one frame of victory. White won frames eight to ten to require a final frame decider. During the concluding frame, White undercut a red into the bottom pocket, allowing Williams to clinch the frame 70–24 and the match 6–5. Williams said that White had recovered "really well" and the last frame put a plethora of pressure on both players but noted his form against Hunter had no meaning for the final. He commented on the crowd: "It was difficult to concentrate when someone in the crowd starts whistling while I'm trying to take a shot."

=== Final ===
The final between Hunter and Williams was held over two sessions as the best-of-19 frames on 10 February. This was the first meeting between the two players since the 2001 Champions Cup earlier in the season and the final was their highest ranking match since the 2000 Grand Prix where Williams beat Hunter 5–3 in the quarter-finals. Williams had won all six matches against Hunter with a combined total of 30–9 in frames won. The referee for the final was Jan Verhaas of the Netherlands. Williams won the first frame with a break of 79 and the following three to go 4–0 ahead. In the fifth frame, which lasted 35 minutes, Hunter gave away 24 points in fouls to Williams' 20 before Williams won the frame 82–79 on a clearance from the green ball to the black. Williams broke down on a 56 break in frame six, allowing Hunter to win the frame on the pink. Hunter claimed the seventh frame with breaks of 32 and 69. The eighth frame saw Williams end on a 56 break after missing the 13th red by undercutting it to a top corner. This enabled Hunter to produce a 36 clearance completed on the pink to end the first session 5–3 behind.

On resumption of the match, Hunter won the ninth frame with a break of 61 and the tenth to level at 5–5 when Williams left the black on the inside of the top-right corner pocket from poor contact. Frames 11 and 12 were shared for a 6–6 score at the mid-session interval. In frame 13, Hunter was 54–24 behind when he obtained two snookers before missing the blue ball to the top-left corner pocket, allowing Williams to claim the frame. Hunter returned the score to a tie with an 84 break in frame 14 and took the lead for the first time in the next following errors from Williams. A break of 45 from Williams again tied the final in frame 16, before Hunter took the 17th frame after the former got stuck in a snooker. Williams secured frame 18 on a break of 72 to force a final frame decider. In the concluding frame, Williams scored 10 points before Hunter's break of 65 secured him a 10–9 win.

This was Hunter's second Masters victory in a row; he went on to win the tournament for a third and final time in 2004. He was third player in history after Cliff Thorburn and Hendry to successfully defend the Masters since it was first held in 1975, and the fifth to have won it for a second time. Hunter earned £190,000 prize money for winning the event; his earnings for the campaign increased to £324,600, moving him past Higgins for the lead of the seasonal money list. He commented on the victory: "I'm so happy to have won the match — especially to retain the title. Only Stephen Hendry and Cliff Thorburn have won it in successive years — so I'm up there with them." Williams said of his fifth loss in the final of a tournament extending back to the 2000 Grand Prix: "I feel sick because that was one I threw away. I know I got close but a defeat like that could well knock me back to square one. I've got to put it out of my mind, but that's going to be tough. The more finals you lose, the less confidence you have."

== Main draw ==
=== First round ===
Numbers given in brackets after players names show the competition's 15th and 16th seeds. Players in bold indicate match winners.

Match	Date	Player 1	Score	Player 2
WC1	3 February	**Fergal O'Brien** (IRL) (16)	**6**–5	Steve Davis (ENG)
WC2	4 February	Dave Harold (ENG) (15)	3–**6**	**Ryan Day** (WAL)

=== Main draw ===
Numbers to the left of players' names show the tournament's seeds. Players in bold denote match winners.

Last 16; Best of 11 frames
1	**Paul Hunter** (ENG)	**6**
9	Stephen Lee (ENG)	3
8	**Peter Ebdon** (ENG)	**6**
14	Graeme Dott (SCO)	4
5	Ken Doherty (IRL)	3
16	**Fergal O'Brien** (IRL)	**6**
4	John Higgins (SCO)	5
12	**Alan McManus** (SCO)	**6**
3	**Mark Williams** (WAL)	**6**
13	Mark King (ENG)	1
6	**Stephen Hendry** (SCO)	**6**
Ryan Day (WAL)	0
7	Matthew Stevens (WAL)	1
11	**Jimmy White** (ENG)	**6**
2	**Ronnie O'Sullivan** (ENG)	**6**
10	Joe Swail (NIR)	3

Quarter-finals; Best of 11 frames
1	(England) **Paul Hunter**	**6**
8	(England) Peter Ebdon	5
16	(Republic of Ireland) Fergal O'Brien	4
12	(Scotland) **Alan McManus**	**6**
3	(Wales) **Mark Williams**	**6**
6	(Scotland) Stephen Hendry	4
11	(England) **Jimmy White**	**6**
2	(England) Ronnie O'Sullivan	2

Semi-finals; Best of 11 frames
1	(England) **Paul Hunter**	**6**
12	(Scotland) Alan McManus	5
3	(Wales) **Mark Williams**	**6**
11	(England) Jimmy White	5

Final; Best of 19 frames
1	(England) **Paul Hunter**	**10**
3	(Wales) Mark Williams	9

== Final ==
The bold text in the table indicates winning frame scores and the winning finalist. Breaks over 50 are displayed in brackets.

Final: Best of 19 frames. Referee: Jan Verhaas; Wembley Conference Centre, London, England, 10 February 2002.
Paul Hunter (1); England	10–9	Mark Williams (3); Wales
Afternoon: 1–84 (79), 51–64, 6–83, 53–64, 79–82, 74–56 (Williams 56), 107–7 (69), 67–56 (Williams 56); Evening: 88–8 (61), 59–56, 20–61 (53), 70–5 (57), 39–65, 85–6 (84), 71–34, 4–65, 65–37, 0–73 (72), 65–10 (65)
84	Highest break	79
0	Century breaks	0
5	50+ breaks	5

== Century breaks ==
There were 13 century breaks made by 9 different players over the course of the 2002 Masters. The highest break of the competition, a 138, was compiled by O'Sullivan in the fourth frame of his first round match with Swail, earning him £21,000 prize money and the Gold Medal award.

- 138, 108 – Ronnie O'Sullivan
- 133, 127, 102 – Mark Williams
- 124 – Peter Ebdon
- 109 – Joe Swail
- 108 – Jimmy White
- 105, 101 – Paul Hunter
- 103 – Stephen Hendry
- 102 – Alan McManus
- 100 – Fergal O'Brien
