= 2001 LG Cup (snooker) =

LG Cup
Tournament information
- Dates: 12–21 October 2001
- Venue: Guild Hall
- City: Preston
- Country: England
- Organisation: WPBSA
- Format: Ranking event
- Total prize fund: £617,200
- Winner's share: £82,500
- Highest break: Ronnie O'Sullivan (ENG) (147)

Final
- Champion: Stephen Lee (ENG)
- Runner-up: Peter Ebdon (ENG)
- Score: 9–4

The 2001 LG Cup was a professional ranking snooker tournament that took place between 12 and 21 October 2001 at the Guild Hall in Preston, England. The highest break of the tournament was 147 made by Ronnie O'Sullivan.

Mark Williams was the defending champion, but he lost to Stephen Hendry in the quarter-finals. Stephen Lee defeated Peter Ebdon 9–4 in the final to win his second ranking title.

== Prize fund ==
The breakdown of prize money for the tournament was as follows:

- Winner: £82,500
- Runner-up: £42,500
- Semi-finalists: £21,250
- Quarter-finalists: £11,700
- Last 16: £9,600
- Last 32: £7,800
- Last 48: £4,000
- Last 64: £3,150
- Last 80: £2,150
- Last 96: £1,450
- Highest break: £7,500
- Highest break (non-televised): £1,800
- Main stage maximum break: £27,500
- Total: £617,200

== Tournament summary ==
Defending champion Mark Williams was the number 1 seed with World Champion Ronnie O'Sullivan seeded 2. The remaining places were allocated to players based on the world rankings.

== Main draw ==
Last 48; Best of 9 frames
25	(Australia) Quinten Hann	5
45	(England) Michael Holt	3
31	(Wales) Anthony Davies	2
56	(England) Jason Ferguson	5
20	(Wales) Dominic Dale	5
(England) Rory McLeod	0
26	(Scotland) Billy Snaddon	0
60	(England) Mark Davis	5
21	(England) Steve Davis	5
34	(Northern Ireland) Patrick Wallace	3
28	(Republic of Ireland) Michael Judge	3
(Thailand) Phaitoon Phonbun	5
24	(Scotland) Chris Small	1
(Finland) Robin Hull	5
22	(England) John Parrott	5
40	(Pakistan) Shokat Ali	4
17	(Hong Kong) Marco Fu	5
61	(England) Ali Carter	4
32	(Thailand) James Wattana	1
85	(England) Barry Hawkins	5
27	(England) Joe Perry	2
33	(England) Brian Morgan	5
30	(England) David Gray	5
52	(Scotland) Stephen Maguire	0
19	(England) Anthony Hamilton	5
37	(England) Gary Wilkinson	4
29	(Malta) Tony Drago	4
38	(England) Alfie Burden	5
18	(Scotland) Drew Henry
41	(Scotland) Marcus Campbell	2
23	(England) Nigel Bond	3
50	(England) Jonathan Birch	5

Last 32; Best of 9 frames
1	(Wales) Mark Williams	5
25	(Australia) Quinten Hann	4
15	(England) Dave Harold	5
56	(England) Jason Ferguson	2
12	(Scotland) Alan McManus	5
20	(Wales) Dominic Dale	3
5	(Scotland) Stephen Hendry	5
60	(England) Mark Davis	1
8	(England) Stephen Lee	5
21	(England) Steve Davis	1
14	(Scotland) Graeme Dott	5
(Thailand) Phaitoon Phonbun	1
13	(England) Mark King	5
(Finland) Robin Hull	3
3	(Scotland) John Higgins	5
22	(England) John Parrott	1
4	(Republic of Ireland) Ken Doherty	2
17	(Hong Kong) Marco Fu	5
16	(Republic of Ireland) Fergal O'Brien	4
85	(England) Barry Hawkins	5
10	(Northern Ireland) Joe Swail	5
33	(England) Brian Morgan	1
5	(Wales) Matthew Stevens	5
30	(England) David Gray	3
7	(England) Peter Ebdon	5
19	(England) Anthony Hamilton	4
9	(England) Paul Hunter	5
38	(England) Alfie Burden	1
11	(England) Jimmy White	3
18	(Scotland) Drew Henry	5
2	(England) Ronnie O'Sullivan	5
50	(England) Jonathan Birch	0

Last 16; Best of 9 frames
1	(Wales) Mark Williams	5
15	(England) Dave Harold	3
12	(Scotland) Alan McManus	4
5	(Scotland) Stephen Hendry	5
8	(England) Stephen Lee	5
14	(Scotland) Graeme Dott	4
13	(England) Mark King	4
3	(Scotland) John Higgins	5
17	(Hong Kong) Marco Fu	4
85	(England) Barry Hawkins	5
10	(Northern Ireland) Joe Swail	5
5	(Wales) Matthew Stevens	2
7	(England) Peter Ebdon	5
9	(England) Paul Hunter	4
18	(Scotland) Drew Henry	1
2	(England) Ronnie O'Sullivan	5

Quarter-finals; Best of 9 frames
1	(Wales) Mark Williams	2
5	(Scotland) Stephen Hendry	5
8	(England) Stephen Lee	5
3	(Scotland) John Higgins	2
85	(England) Barry Hawkins	4
10	(Northern Ireland) Joe Swail	5
7	(England) Peter Ebdon	5
2	(England) Ronnie O'Sullivan	4

Semi-finals; Best of 11 frames
5	(Scotland) Stephen Hendry	4
8	(England) Stephen Lee	6
10	(Northern Ireland) Joe Swail	3
7	(England) Peter Ebdon	6

Final; Best of 17 frames
8	(England) Stephen Lee	9
7	(England) Peter Ebdon	4

== Final ==
Final: Best of 17 frames. Referee: Colin Brinded. Guild Hall, Preston, England, 21 October 2001.
Stephen Lee (8); England	9–4	Peter Ebdon (7); England
Afternoon: 99–17, 84–54 (76), 69–13, 1–62, 52–55, 26–62 (60), 75–0 (74), 85–0; Evening: 55–83 (78), 70–9 (70), 66–12, 61–21 (52), 72–4 (71)
76	Highest break	78
0	Century breaks	0
5	50+ breaks	2
