= 2000 Welsh Open (snooker) =

2000 Regal Welsh Open
Tournament information
- Dates: 24–30 January 2000
- Venue: Cardiff International Arena
- City: Cardiff
- Country: Wales
- Organisation: WPBSA
- Format: Ranking event
- Total prize fund: £401,250
- Winner's share: £62,000
- Highest break: Ronnie O'Sullivan (ENG) (141)

Final
- Champion: John Higgins (SCO)
- Runner-up: Stephen Lee (ENG)
- Score: 9–8

The 2000 Welsh Open (officially the 2000 Regal Welsh Open) was a professional ranking snooker tournament that took place between 24 and 30 January 2000 at the Cardiff International Arena in Cardiff, Wales.

Mark Williams was the defending champion, but he lost his last 16 match against Matthew Stevens.

John Higgins defeated Stephen Lee 9–8 in the final to win his 13th ranking title.

== Tournament summary ==
Defending champion Mark Williams was the number 1 seed with World Champion Stephen Hendry seeded 2. The remaining places were allocated to players based on the world rankings.

== Main draw ==
Last 64; Best of 9 frames
1	(Wales) Mark Williams	5
61	(England) Alfie Burden	0
28	(Northern Ireland) Joe Swail	5
(England) Nick Dyson	3
19	(Wales) Dominic Dale	5
96	(England) Troy Shaw	3
9	(Wales) Matthew Stevens	5
34	(England) Joe Perry	1
12	(England) Paul Hunter	5
69	(Pakistan) Shokat Ali	2
23	(Wales) Darren Morgan	1
82	(Scotland) Martin Dziewialtowski	5
25	(Scotland) Graeme Dott	5
57	(England) Mick Price	2
6	(England) Stephen Lee	5
60	(England) David Gray	4
8	(Scotland) Alan McManus	4
39	(England) Ian McCulloch	5
26	(Australia) Quinten Hann	w/d
(Wales) Mark Fenton	w/o
24	(Scotland) Billy Snaddon	0
73	(England) Leigh Griffin	5
14	(England) Mark King	3
35	(Hong Kong) Marco Fu	5
16	(England) Jimmy White	5
49	(England) Gary Ponting	0
32	(England) Andy Hicks	5
51	(England) Rod Lawler	2
29	(England) Gary Wilkinson	1
68	(England) Stuart Pettman	5
4	(England) Ronnie O'Sullivan	5
56	(England) Paul Wykes	0
3	(Scotland) John Higgins	5
80	(Wales) Anthony Davies	3
21	(England) Nigel Bond	1
93	(England) Stuart Bingham	5
30	(Northern Ireland) Terry Murphy	2
(Wales) Ryan Day	5
15	(England) Steve Davis	5
59	(England) Joe Johnson	4
10	(England) Anthony Hamilton	4
63	(England) Jimmy Michie	5
27	(Scotland) Jamie Burnett	1
33	(England) Bradley Jones	5
18	(Scotland) Chris Small	3
58	(England) David Roe	5
5	(England) John Parrott	3
45	(Scotland) Drew Henry	5
7	(Republic of Ireland) Ken Doherty	5
89	(Scotland) Craig MacGillivray	1
20	(Malta) Tony Drago	5
(Thailand) Noppadon Noppachorn	1
31	(England) Brian Morgan	5
90	(England) Darren Clarke	3
13	(England) Peter Ebdon	5
53	(England) Jonathan Birch	1
11	(Republic of Ireland) Fergal O'Brien	5
42	(England) Peter Lines	2
17	(England) Dave Harold	5
(England) Nick Terry	1
22	(Thailand) James Wattana	5
(England) Mike Dunn	0
2	(Scotland) Stephen Hendry	3
50	(England) Jason Ferguson	5

Last 32; Best of 9 frames
1	(Wales) Mark Williams	5
28	(Northern Ireland) Joe Swail	1
19	(Wales) Dominic Dale	3
9	(Wales) Matthew Stevens	5
12	(England) Paul Hunter	5
82	(Scotland) Martin Dziewialtowski	3
25	(Scotland) Graeme Dott	2
6	(England) Stephen Lee	5
39	(England) Ian McCulloch	5
(Wales) Mark Fenton	2
73	(England) Leigh Griffin	0
35	(Hong Kong) Marco Fu	5
16	(England) Jimmy White	5
32	(England) Andy Hicks	2
68	(England) Stuart Pettman	3
4	(England) Ronnie O'Sullivan	5
3	(Scotland) John Higgins	5
93	(England) Stuart Bingham	0
(Wales) Ryan Day	5
15	(England) Steve Davis	4
63	(England) Jimmy Michie	2
33	(England) Bradley Jones	5
58	(England) David Roe	2
45	(Scotland) Drew Henry	5
7	(Republic of Ireland) Ken Doherty	5
20	(Malta) Tony Drago	3
31	(England) Brian Morgan	3
13	(England) Peter Ebdon	5
11	(Republic of Ireland) Fergal O'Brien	5
17	(England) Dave Harold	4
22	(Thailand) James Wattana	5
50	(England) Jason Ferguson	2

Last 16; Best of 9 frames
1	(Wales) Mark Williams	4
9	(Wales) Matthew Stevens	5
12	(England) Paul Hunter	4
6	(England) Stephen Lee	5
39	(England) Ian McCulloch	5
35	(Hong Kong) Marco Fu	2
16	(England) Jimmy White	5
4	(England) Ronnie O'Sullivan	2
3	(Scotland) John Higgins	5
(Wales) Ryan Day	1
33	(England) Bradley Jones	5
45	(Scotland) Drew Henry	0
7	(Republic of Ireland) Ken Doherty	4
13	(England) Peter Ebdon	5
11	(Republic of Ireland) Fergal O'Brien	5
22	(Thailand) James Wattana	0

Quarter-finals; Best of 9 frames
9	(Wales) Matthew Stevens	2
6	(England) Stephen Lee	5
39	(England) Ian McCulloch	1
16	(England) Jimmy White	5
3	(Scotland) John Higgins	5
33	(England) Bradley Jones	1
13	(England) Peter Ebdon	5
11	(Republic of Ireland) Fergal O'Brien	2

Semi-finals; Best of 11 frames
6	(England) Stephen Lee	6
16	(England) Jimmy White	5
3	(Scotland) John Higgins	6
13	(England) Peter Ebdon	4

Final; Best of 17 frames
6	(England) Stephen Lee	8
3	(Scotland) John Higgins	9

== Final ==
Final: Best of 17 frames. Referee: Eirian Williams. Cardiff International Arena, Cardiff, Wales, 30 January 2000.
Stephen Lee (6); England	8–9	John Higgins (3); Scotland
Afternoon: 17–102 (101), 129–0 (129), 78–43, 74–36, 0–129 (77, 52), 1–74 (52), 68–54 (50), 7–83 (83); Evening: 71–28, 46–94, 70–61 (Higgins 56, Lee 64), 81–67 (Higgins 67), 34–86 (63), 78–42 (71), 13–113 (54, 59), 0–100 (100), 8–65
129	Highest break	101
1	Century breaks	2
4	50+ breaks	11
