= 2001 Scottish Open (snooker) =

2001 Regal Scottish Open
Tournament information
- Dates: 8–15 April 2001
- Venue: AECC
- City: Aberdeen
- Country: Scotland
- Organisation: WPBSA
- Format: Ranking event
- Total prize fund: £438,050
- Winner's share: £62,000

Final
- Champion: Peter Ebdon (ENG)
- Runner-up: Ken Doherty (IRL)
- Score: 9–7

The 2001 Scottish Open (officially the 2001 Regal Scottish Open) was a professional ranking snooker tournament that took place between 8–15 April 2001 at the AECC in Aberdeen, Scotland. It was the seventh and penultimate ranking event of the 2000/2001 season.

Peter Ebdon won the title by defeating Ken Doherty 9–7 in the final. The defending champion, Ronnie O'Sullivan, was defeated by Mark Davis in the second round.

== Main draw ==
Last 48; Best of 9 frames
26	(Malta) Tony Drago	1
77	(England) Mark Davis	5
22	(England) Mark King	5
33	(Scotland) Jamie Burnett	2
31	(England) Joe Perry	2
46	(Republic of Ireland) Michael Judge	5
27	(Thailand) James Wattana	5
(England) Munraj Pal	1
30	(Northern Ireland) Terry Murphy	1
(Republic of Ireland) David McDonnell	5
28	(England) Brian Morgan	4
(Wales) Ryan Day	5
24	(Scotland) Billy Snaddon	5
38	(England) Ian McCulloch	3
32	(Australia) Quinten Hann	3
92	(England) Ali Carter	5
17	(England) Steve Davis	5
(England) Mark Gray	0
29	(Scotland) Drew Henry	5
64	(England) Steve James	4
20	(Wales) Dominic Dale	3
55	(England) David Roe	5
23	(England) Nigel Bond	5
50	(England) Alfie Burden	2
18	(England) Jimmy White	3
100	(Scotland) Stephen Maguire	5
21	(Scotland) Chris Small	5
37	(England) Bradley Jones	3
19	(Scotland) Graeme Dott	5
(England) Antony Bolsover	2
25	(Wales) Darren Morgan	w/d
52	(England) David Gray	w/o

Last 32; Best of 9 frames
1	(England) Ronnie O'Sullivan	1
77	(England) Mark Davis	5
15	(Hong Kong) Marco Fu	4
22	(England) Mark King	5
13	(England) Dave Harold	4
46	(Republic of Ireland) Michael Judge	5
7	(Republic of Ireland) Ken Doherty	5
27	(Thailand) James Wattana	2
5	(England) Stephen Lee	4
(Republic of Ireland) David McDonnell	5
14	(England) Paul Hunter	5
(Wales) Ryan Day	3
16	(Northern Ireland) Joe Swail	5
24	(Scotland) Billy Snaddon	1
4	(Scotland) Stephen Hendry	2
92	(England) Ali Carter	5
3	(Scotland) John Higgins	5
17	(England) Steve Davis	3
9	(Republic of Ireland) Fergal O'Brien	3
29	(Scotland) Drew Henry	5
11	(England) Anthony Hamilton	5
55	(England) David Roe	2
6	(Wales) Matthew Stevens	5
23	(England) Nigel Bond	1
8	(Scotland) Alan McManus	5
100	(Scotland) Stephen Maguire	0
10	(England) John Parrott	5
21	(Scotland) Chris Small	2
12	(England) Peter Ebdon	5
19	(Scotland) Graeme Dott	3
2	(Wales) Mark Williams	5
52	(England) David Gray	4

Last 16; Best of 9 frames
77	(England) Mark Davis	5
22	(England) Mark King	1
46	(Republic of Ireland) Michael Judge	3
7	(Republic of Ireland) Ken Doherty	5
(Republic of Ireland) David McDonnell	2
14	(England) Paul Hunter	5
16	(Northern Ireland) Joe Swail	5
92	(England) Ali Carter	1
3	(Scotland) John Higgins	4
29	(Scotland) Drew Henry	5
11	(England) Anthony Hamilton	0
6	(Wales) Matthew Stevens	5
8	(Scotland) Alan McManus	5
10	(England) John Parrott	1
12	(England) Peter Ebdon	5
2	(Wales) Mark Williams	2

Quarter-finals; Best of 9 frames
77	(England) Mark Davis	3
7	(Republic of Ireland) Ken Doherty	5
14	(England) Paul Hunter	5
16	(Northern Ireland) Joe Swail	2
29	(Scotland) Drew Henry	5
6	(Wales) Matthew Stevens	4
8	(Scotland) Alan McManus	2
12	(England) Peter Ebdon	5

Semi-finals; Best of 11 frames
7	(Republic of Ireland) Ken Doherty	6
14	(England) Paul Hunter	3
29	(Scotland) Drew Henry	4
12	(England) Peter Ebdon	6

Final; Best of 17 frames
7	(Republic of Ireland) Ken Doherty	7
12	(England) Peter Ebdon	9

== Final ==
Final: Best of 17 frames. AECC, Aberdeen, Scotland, 15 April 2001.
Peter Ebdon (12); England	9–7	Ken Doherty (7); Ireland
Afternoon: 66–67 (Ebdon 66, Doherty 59), 82–16 (60), 109–0 (55), 84–0 (84), 1–88 (88), 107–6 (79), 51–78, 0–76; Evening: 60–38, 35–62, 57–69, 73–0, 64–53, 24–87, 58–57 (Doherty 52), 62–23
84	Highest break	88
0	Century breaks	0
5	50+ breaks	3
