= 2005 Irish Masters =

Fáilte Ireland Irish Masters
Tournament information
- Dates: 6–13 March 2005
- Venue: Citywest Hotel
- City: Dublin
- Country: Ireland
- Organisation: WPBSA
- Format: Ranking event
- Total prize fund: £250,000
- Winner's share: £40,000
- Highest break: Mark Williams (WAL) (141)

Final
- Champion: Ronnie O'Sullivan (ENG)
- Runner-up: Matthew Stevens (WAL)
- Score: 10–8

The 2005 Fáilte Ireland Irish Masters was a professional ranking snooker tournament that took place between 6–13 March 2005 at the Citywest Hotel in Dublin, Ireland. This was the last time the tournament was run as a ranking event.

Ronnie O'Sullivan won the title by defeating Matthew Stevens 10–8 in the final.

== Prize fund ==
The breakdown of prize money for this year is shown below:

- Winner: £40,000
- Runner-up: £20,000
- Semi-final: £10,000
- Quarter-final: £7,000
- Last 16: £5,000
- Last 32: £3,100
- Last 48: £1,775
- Last 64: £1,375
- Stage two highest break: £2,000
- Stage two maximum break: £20,000
- Total: £250,000

== Main draw ==
Last 32; Best of 9 frames
1	(England) Peter Ebdon	4
(England) Dave Harold	5
11	(England) Jimmy White	5
(England) Mark Selby	1
16	(Hong Kong) Marco Fu	3
(England) Robert Milkins	5
5	(England) Paul Hunter	5
(Malta) Tony Drago	3
7	(Wales) Matthew Stevens	5
(England) Anthony Hamilton	3
12	(Scotland) Chris Small	4
(England) Ian McCulloch	5
13	(England) Steve Davis	5
(England) Mark Davis	2
4	(Scotland) Stephen Hendry	5
(Finland) Robin Hull	1
3	(Wales) Mark Williams	5
(Wales) Paul Davies	3
10	(Scotland) Alan McManus	5
(England) Nigel Bond	4
9	(England) Stephen Lee	5
(Thailand) James Wattana	3
6	(Scotland) John Higgins	4
(Republic of Ireland) Michael Judge	5
8	(Republic of Ireland) Ken Doherty	5
(England) Barry Pinches	3
14	(England) David Gray	4
(Northern Ireland) Gerard Greene	5
15	(Scotland) Graeme Dott	3
(England) Barry Hawkins	5
2	(England) Ronnie O'Sullivan	5
(Scotland) Stephen Maguire	3

Last 16; Best of 9 frames
(England) Dave Harold	5
11	(England) Jimmy White	4
(England) Robert Milkins	5
5	(England) Paul Hunter	2
7	(Wales) Matthew Stevens	5
(England) Ian McCulloch	1
13	(England) Steve Davis	4
4	(Scotland) Stephen Hendry	5
3	(Wales) Mark Williams	5
10	(Scotland) Alan McManus	3
9	(England) Stephen Lee	5
(Republic of Ireland) Michael Judge	3
8	(Republic of Ireland) Ken Doherty	0
(Northern Ireland) Gerard Greene	5
(England) Barry Hawkins	4
2	(England) Ronnie O'Sullivan	5

Quarter-finals; Best of 11 frames
(England) Dave Harold	3
(England) Robert Milkins	6
7	(Wales) Matthew Stevens	6
4	(Scotland) Stephen Hendry	5
3	(Wales) Mark Williams	6
9	(England) Stephen Lee	4
(Northern Ireland) Gerard Greene	4
2	(England) Ronnie O'Sullivan	6

Semi-finals; Best of 17 frames
(England) Robert Milkins	8
7	(Wales) Matthew Stevens	9
3	(Wales) Mark Williams	5
2	(England) Ronnie O'Sullivan	9

Final; Best of 19 frames
7	(Wales) Matthew Stevens	8
2	(England) Ronnie O'Sullivan	10

== Final ==
Final: Best of 19 frames Citywest Hotel, Dublin, Ireland, 13 March 2005.
Matthew Stevens (7); Wales	8–10	Ronnie O'Sullivan (2); England
Afternoon: 77–22, 2–66 (57), 0–81 (61), 24–73 (51), 27–74 (74), 0–87 (87), 12–68 (67), 84–13; Evening: 70–58 (O'Sullivan 58), 135–0 (135), 77–0 (65), 65–27 (57), 0–108 (108), 123–0 (61, 62), 6–93 (87), 74–19, 25–90 (59), 68–69 (68, 69)
135	Highest break	108
1	Century breaks	1
6	50+ breaks	11

== Qualifying ==
Qualifying for the tournament took place between 10 and 13 January 2005 at Pontin's in Prestatyn, Wales.

Round 1 Best of 9 frames
(Pakistan) Shokat Ali	2
(Republic of Ireland) Rodney Goggins	5
(China) Ding Junhui	w/o
(England) David Hall	w/d
(England) Steve James	5
(China) Jin Long	4
(Republic of Ireland) Leo Fernandez	2
(Scotland) Hugh Abernethy	5
(England) Ricky Walden	5
(England) Adam Davies	4
(England) Paul Wykes	2
(England) Gary Wilson	5
(England) Alfie Burden	5
(Northern Ireland) Sean O'Neill	3
(England) Rory McLeod	5
(England) Mike Hallett	2
(Wales) Paul Davies	5
(Netherlands) Stefan Mazrocis	4
(England) Simon Bedford	5
(England) Paul Davison	3
(England) Craig Butler	1
(England) Ben Woollaston	5
(England) Andrew Norman	w/o
(England) Mark Gray	w/d
(England) Tom Ford	0
(China) Liu Song	5
(Scotland) Scott MacKenzie	1
(England) Brian Salmon	5
(Republic of Ireland) Joe Delaney	5
(England) David McDonnell	3
(Wales) Darren Morgan	5
(England) Joe Jogia	0

Round 2 Best of 9 frames
(Belgium) Bjorn Haneveer	2
(Republic of Ireland) Rodney Goggins	5
(England) Gary Wilkinson	1
(China) Ding Junhui	5
(England) Jimmy Michie	1
(England) Steve James	5
(Australia) Neil Robertson	5
(Scotland) Hugh Abernethy	1
(England) Andy Hicks	5
(England) Ricky Walden	3
(England) David Roe	3
(England) Gary Wilson	5
(England) Nick Walker	5
(England) Alfie Burden	2
(England) Sean Storey	4
(England) Rory McLeod	5
(Wales) Anthony Davies	3
(Wales) Paul Davies	5
(England) Mike Dunn	0
(England) Simon Bedford	5
(England) Jonathan Birch	0
(England) Ben Woollaston	5
(England) Adrian Gunnell	2
(England) Andrew Norman	5
(Scotland) Marcus Campbell	5
(China) Liu Song	2
(England) Rod Lawler	5
(England) Brian Salmon	3
(Scotland) Jamie Burnett	5
(Republic of Ireland) Joe Delaney	4
(Wales) Lee Walker	4
(Wales) Darren Morgan	5

Round 3 Best of 9 frames
(England) Dave Harold	5
(Republic of Ireland) Rodney Goggins	2
(England) Mark Selby	5
(China) Ding Junhui	2
(England) Shaun Murphy	5
(England) Steve James	1
(England) Stuart Pettman	0
(Australia) Neil Robertson	5
(Wales) Ryan Day	5
(England) Andy Hicks	4
(England) Nick Dyson	3
(England) Gary Wilson	5
(England) Mark Davis	5
(England) Nick Walker	4
(Finland) Robin Hull	5
(England) Rory McLeod	0
(Republic of Ireland) Fergal O'Brien	4
(Wales) Paul Davies	5
(England) Nigel Bond	5
(England) Simon Bedford	4
(Thailand) James Wattana	5
(England) Ben Woollaston	0
(Republic of Ireland) Michael Judge	5
(England) Andrew Norman	3
(Northern Ireland) Patrick Wallace	5
(Scotland) Marcus Campbell	3
(England) Brian Morgan	5
(England) Rod Lawler	2
(England) Barry Hawkins	5
(Scotland) Jamie Burnett	4
(England) Stuart Bingham	5
(Wales) Darren Morgan	3

Round 4 Best of 9 frames
(Australia) Quinten Hann	4
(England) Dave Harold	5
(England) Michael Holt	3
(England) Mark Selby	5
(England) Robert Milkins	5
(England) Shaun Murphy	4
(Malta) Tony Drago	5
(Australia) Neil Robertson	3
(England) Anthony Hamilton	5
(Wales) Ryan Day	1
(England) Ian McCulloch	5
(England) Gary Wilson	1
(England) Joe Perry	1
(England) Mark Davis	5
(Northern Ireland) Joe Swail	4
(Finland) Robin Hull	5
(Wales) Dominic Dale	0
(Wales) Paul Davies	5
(England) John Parrott	2
(England) Nigel Bond	5
(England) Ali Carter	2
(Thailand) James Wattana	5
(England) Mark King	1
(Republic of Ireland) Michael Judge	5
(England) Barry Pinches	5
(Northern Ireland) Patrick Wallace	0
(Northern Ireland) Gerard Greene	5
(England) Brian Morgan	1
(Scotland) Drew Henry	3
(England) Barry Hawkins	5
(Scotland) Stephen Maguire	5
(England) Stuart Bingham	1

== Century breaks ==
=== Qualifying stage centuries ===
- 141, 125, 110 – Ding Junhui
- 138 – Mark Selby
- 138 – Jamie Burnett
- 132 – Barry Pinches
- 130 – Gary Wilson
- 128 – Sean Storey
- 127 – Alfie Burden
- 126 – Joe Delaney
- 125, 114 – Dave Harold
- 123, 104 – Michael Holt
- 116 – Ali Carter
- 115 – Robert Milkins
- 115 – Sean O'Neill
- 113 – Shokat Ali
- 111 – Darren Morgan
- 108 – Mark Davis
- 108 – Brian Salmon
- 103 – Liu Song
- 103 – Joe Swail
- 102 – Ryan Day
- 100 – Barry Hawkins

=== Televised stage centuries ===
- 141, 105 – Mark Williams
- 140, 137, 128, 114, 108, 107, 104, 102 – Ronnie O'Sullivan
- 136 – Stephen Maguire
- 135, 133 – Stephen Hendry
- 135, 113, 101, 100 – Matthew Stevens
- 135 – Chris Small
- 132 – Paul Hunter
- 128 – Barry Hawkins
- 113 – Robert Milkins
- 112 – David Gray
- 110 – Peter Ebdon
- 110 – Michael Judge
- 105 – Jimmy White
