= 1999 Welsh Open (snooker) =

1999 Regal Welsh Open
Tournament information
- Dates: 25–31 January 1999
- Venue: Cardiff International Arena
- City: Cardiff
- Country: Wales
- Organisation: WPBSA
- Format: Ranking event
- Total prize fund: £382,900
- Winner's share: £60,000
- Highest break: Ronnie O'Sullivan (ENG) (147)

Final
- Champion: Mark Williams (WAL)
- Runner-up: Stephen Hendry (SCO)
- Score: 9–8

The 1999 Welsh Open (officially the 1999 Regal Welsh Open) was a professional ranking snooker tournament that took place between 25 and 31 January 1999 at the Cardiff International Arena in Cardiff, Wales.

Paul Hunter was the defending champion, but he lost his last 32 match against Fergal O'Brien.

Mark Williams defeated Stephen Hendry 9–8 in the final to win his fifth ranking title.

== Tournament summary ==
Defending champion Paul Hunter was the number 1 seed with World Champion John Higgins seeded 2. The remaining places were allocated to players based on the world rankings. Ronnie O'Sullivan made a maximum break during the third frame of his quarter final victory over James Wattana.

== Main draw ==
Last 64; Best of 9 frames
1	(England) Paul Hunter	5
60	(England) Ian McCulloch	4
21	(Republic of Ireland) Fergal O'Brien	5
(England) Ali Carter	2
20	(England) Dave Harold	3
55	(England) Joe Johnson	5
15	(England) Steve Davis	5
44	(England) Bradley Jones	4
9	(Scotland) Alan McManus	5
(Scotland) Alan Burnett	3
30	(Scotland) Graeme Dott	0
(Hong Kong) Marco Fu	5
25	(Scotland) Chris Small	5
58	(Republic of Ireland) Michael Judge	2
6	(Wales) Mark Williams	5
34	(England) Neal Foulds	2
5	(Republic of Ireland) Ken Doherty	2
(Northern Ireland) Patrick Wallace	5
27	(England) Brian Morgan	4
47	(Wales) Tony Chappel	5
18	(England) Gary Wilkinson	2
52	(Northern Ireland) Dennis Taylor	5
16	(Thailand) James Wattana	5
(England) Robert Milkins	4
13	(Canada) Alain Robidoux	5
(Thailand) Phaitoon Phonbun	4
17	(England) Mark King	3
(England) Mike Dunn	5
19	(England) Jimmy White	5
(England) Barry Mapstone	1
4	(England) Ronnie O'Sullivan	5
(England) Nigel Gilbert	2
3	(Scotland) Stephen Hendry	5
48	(England) David Roe	1
31	(Scotland) Jamie Burnett	1
87	(England) Darren Clarke	5
26	(Wales) Matthew Stevens	5
94	(Scotland) John Lardner	1
10	(England) Stephen Lee	5
78	(England) Matthew Couch	3
12	(England) Anthony Hamilton	5
75	(England) Gary Ponting	4
32	(Scotland) Billy Snaddon	5
43	(Scotland) Drew Henry	2
22	(England) Andy Hicks	4
50	(Wales) Lee Walker	5
7	(England) John Parrott	5
92	(England) Mark Gray	2
8	(England) Peter Ebdon	5
(England) Leigh Griffin	1
29	(Northern Ireland) Terry Murphy	2
56	(England) Mark Davis	5
24	(Wales) Dominic Dale	3
36	(Northern Ireland) Joe Swail	5
14	(England) Nigel Bond	5
68	(England) Dave Finbow	4
11	(Malta) Tony Drago	0
164	(England) Stuart Bingham	5
23	(Wales) Darren Morgan	1
59	(Northern Ireland) Gerard Greene	5
28	(England) Martin Clark	4
(England) Paul Sweeny	5
2	(Scotland) John Higgins	5
66	(Wales) Mark Bennett	1

Last 32; Best of 9 frames
1	(England) Paul Hunter	2
21	(Republic of Ireland) Fergal O'Brien	5
55	(England) Joe Johnson	3
15	(England) Steve Davis	5
9	(Scotland) Alan McManus	5
(Hong Kong) Marco Fu	4
25	(Scotland) Chris Small	0
6	(Wales) Mark Williams	5
(Northern Ireland) Patrick Wallace	5
47	(Wales) Tony Chappel	1
52	(Northern Ireland) Dennis Taylor	2
16	(Thailand) James Wattana	5
13	(Canada) Alain Robidoux	5
(England) Mike Dunn	1
19	(England) Jimmy White	2
4	(England) Ronnie O'Sullivan	5
3	(Scotland) Stephen Hendry	5
87	(England) Darren Clarke	2
26	(Wales) Matthew Stevens	5
10	(England) Stephen Lee	4
12	(England) Anthony Hamilton	5
32	(Scotland) Billy Snaddon	1
50	(Wales) Lee Walker	5
7	(England) John Parrott	4
8	(England) Peter Ebdon	5
56	(England) Mark Davis	0
36	(Northern Ireland) Joe Swail	5
14	(England) Nigel Bond	3
164	(England) Stuart Bingham	5
59	(Northern Ireland) Gerard Greene	4
(England) Paul Sweeny	3
2	(Scotland) John Higgins	5

Last 16; Best of 9 frames
21	(Republic of Ireland) Fergal O'Brien	0
15	(England) Steve Davis	5
9	(Scotland) Alan McManus	0
6	(Wales) Mark Williams	5
(Northern Ireland) Patrick Wallace	2
16	(Thailand) James Wattana	5
13	(Canada) Alain Robidoux	4
4	(England) Ronnie O'Sullivan	5
3	(Scotland) Stephen Hendry	5
26	(Wales) Matthew Stevens	4
12	(England) Anthony Hamilton	5
50	(Wales) Lee Walker	2
8	(England) Peter Ebdon	3
36	(Northern Ireland) Joe Swail	5
164	(England) Stuart Bingham	5
2	(Scotland) John Higgins	4

Quarter-finals; Best of 9 frames
15	(England) Steve Davis	4
6	(Wales) Mark Williams	5
16	(Thailand) James Wattana	2
4	(England) Ronnie O'Sullivan	5
3	(Scotland) Stephen Hendry	5
12	(England) Anthony Hamilton	2
36	(Northern Ireland) Joe Swail	5
164	(England) Stuart Bingham	1

Semi-finals; Best of 11 frames
6	(Wales) Mark Williams	6
4	(England) Ronnie O'Sullivan	1
3	(Scotland) Stephen Hendry	6
36	(Northern Ireland) Joe Swail	2

Final; Best of 17 frames
6	(Wales) Mark Williams	9
3	(Scotland) Stephen Hendry	8

== Final ==
Final: Best of 17 frames. Referee: John Williams. Cardiff International Arena, Cardiff, Wales, 31 January 1999.
Mark Williams (6); Wales	9–8	Stephen Hendry (3); Scotland
Afternoon: 15–100 (57), 59–66, 89–7 (71), 74–1 (62), 15–116 (67), 52–74 (56), 71–24 (56), 13–116 (116); Evening: 82–9 (81), 117–23 (84), 42–71 (52), 67–74 (Williams 67), 68–40, 106–4 (64), 104–6 (104), 54–63 (Williams 52), 65–48
104	Highest break	116
1	Century breaks	1
9	50+ breaks	5
