= 2002 British Open =

Snooker tournament

Tournament information
- Dates: 9–17 November 2002
- Venue: Telford International Arena
- City: Telford
- Country: England
- Organisation: WPBSA
- Format: Ranking event

Final
- Champion: Paul Hunter (ENG)
- Runner-up: Ian McCulloch (ENG)
- Score: 9–4

The 2002 British Open was the 2002 edition of the British Open professional ranking snooker tournament, that was held from 9–17 November 2002 at the Telford International Arena, Telford, England.

Paul Hunter won the tournament by defeating Ian McCulloch nine frames to four in the final. The defending champion, John Higgins, was defeated by McCulloch in the quarter-final. The players each wore a red and blue shirt

== Main draw ==
Last 48; Best of 9 frames
(England) Steve Davis	5
(Northern Ireland) Gerard Greene	3
(Republic of Ireland) Fergal O'Brien	5
(England) Jonathan Birch	1
(England) Ian McCulloch	5
(Thailand) James Wattana	3
(Scotland) Stephen Maguire	5
(Wales) Anthony Davies	3
(England) Ali Carter	5
(England) Mark Davis	3
(England) John Parrott	5
(England) Barry Pinches	0
(England) Jimmy Michie	5
(Scotland) Drew Henry	2
(England) David Gray	5
(England) Robert Milkins	3
(Wales) Dominic Dale	5
(Belgium) Bjorn Haneveer	3
(Iceland) Kristján Helgason	5
(England) Dave Harold	0
(England) Anthony Hamilton	5
(England) Sean Storey	1
(Hong Kong) Marco Fu	5
(Scotland) Euan Henderson	3
(Scotland) Chris Small	5
(England) Peter Lines	0
(England) Brian Morgan	5
(England) Nigel Bond	2
(Republic of Ireland) Michael Judge	5
(England) Nick Walker	2
(Malta) Tony Drago	5
(England) Ricky Walden	2

Last 32; Best of 9 frames
(Scotland) John Higgins	5
(England) Steve Davis	2
(England) Mark King	3
(Republic of Ireland) Fergal O'Brien	5
(Scotland) Graeme Dott	3
(England) Ian McCulloch	5
(England) Stephen Lee	3
(Scotland) Stephen Maguire	5
(Scotland) Stephen Hendry	4
(England) Ali Carter	5
(England) Joe Perry	1
(England) John Parrott	5
(Northern Ireland) Joe Swail	2
(England) Jimmy Michie	5
(Wales) Mark Williams	5
(England) David Gray	3
(England) Ronnie O'Sullivan	5
(Wales) Dominic Dale	1
(England) Paul Hunter	5
(Iceland) Kristján Helgason	3
(England) Jimmy White	4
(England) Anthony Hamilton	5
(Wales) Matthew Stevens	5
(Hong Kong) Marco Fu	2
(Republic of Ireland) Ken Doherty	4
(Scotland) Chris Small	5
(Australia) Quinten Hann	2
(England) Brian Morgan	5
(Scotland) Alan McManus	5
(Republic of Ireland) Michael Judge	3
(England) Peter Ebdon	5
(Malta) Tony Drago	3

Last 16; Best of 9 frames
(Scotland) John Higgins	5
(Republic of Ireland) Fergal O'Brien	1
(Scotland) Stephen Maguire	4
(England) Ian McCulloch	5
(England) Ali Carter	5
(England) John Parrott	1
(England) Jimmy Michie	1
(Wales) Mark Williams	5
(England) Ronnie O'Sullivan	4
(England) Paul Hunter	5
(England) Anthony Hamilton	5
(Wales) Matthew Stevens	2
(Scotland) Chris Small	5
(England) Brian Morgan	3
(Scotland) Alan McManus	5
(England) Peter Ebdon	3

Quarter-finals; Best of 9 frames
(Scotland) John Higgins	2
(England) Ian McCulloch	5
(England) Ali Carter	1
(Wales) Mark Williams	5
(England) Paul Hunter	5
(England) Anthony Hamilton	1
(Scotland) Chris Small	5
(Scotland) Alan McManus	4

Semi-finals; Best of 11 frames
(England) Ian McCulloch	6
(Wales) Mark Williams	3
(England) Paul Hunter	6
(Scotland) Chris Small	3

Final; Best of 17 frames
(England) Ian McCulloch	4
(England) Paul Hunter	9

== Final ==
Final: Best of 17 frames. Referee: Colin Brinded; Telford International Arena, Telford, England. 17 November 2002.
Paul Hunter; England	9–4	Ian McCulloch; England
Afternoon: 69–18, 61–48, 65–47, 0–99 (99), 110–0 (110), 0–84 (70), 91–31 (90), 70–0; Evening: 107–0 (93), 0–135 (135), 72–41 (58), 0–79 (79), 75–0
110	Highest break	135
1	Century breaks	1
4	50+ breaks	4
