= Bradley Jones (snooker player) =

English snooker player

Personal information
- Born: 16 May 1974 (age 52) Ipswich, Suffolk, England

Sport
- Country: England
- Sport: Snooker
- Professional: 1991–2004
- Highest ranking: 33 (1999/2000)
- Best ranking finish: Quarter-final (×1)

Bradley Jones (born 16 May 1974) is an English former professional snooker player.

== Career ==
Born in 1974, Jones turned professional in 1991. His first few years on the tour were low-key, but he reached the first semi-final of his career at Event 1 of the 1994 Strachan Challenge; there, he defeated Wayne Lloyd, John Giles, Darren Limbug, Billy Snaddon and Matt Wilson before losing 4–5 to Andy Hicks.

The following season, runs to the last 16 of the 1994 Benson & Hedges Championship, where he lost 2–5 to the rising Rod Lawler, and the quarter-final of Event 5 of the 1995 Minor Tour, where twenty-year-old John Higgins defeated him 4–0, were highlights, although Jones' prize money from these exploits amounted only to £1,575.

The 1995/1996 season was very poor for Jones, and having earned nothing from ten tournaments, he dropped to 199th in the world rankings. However, he enjoyed a vast upturn in form from 1996; Jones reached the last 32 of the 1997 International Open, losing 1–5 to Paul Wykes, having earlier defeated the prominent Canadian Alain Robidoux 5–4, and also that year's Thailand Open, where the 1996 World finalist Peter Ebdon beat him 5–3. The highlight of this season was Jones' début appearance at the Crucible Theatre in the last 32 of the 1997 World Championship; he held John Parrott to 9–9, before losing the deciding frame by 44 points to 54.

Jones' performances in 1996/1997 had seen him rise 119 places in the rankings to 80th, and 1997/1998 saw more good form; having entered qualifying school to ensure he would keep his place on tour, Jones reached the last 32 of the 1997 UK Championship, losing 6–9 to Darren Morgan, and the last 48 of the 1998 Thailand Masters and that year's World Championship, meeting Jimmy White in both. In the former, he had led White 4–1 but lost 4–5, while the latter encounter resulted in a more comfortable 10–5 victory for White. Jones finished that season 44th in the world rankings, a rise of 155 places over two seasons.

In the 1998/1999 season, Jones was defeated 2–5 by Ken Doherty in the last 16 of the 1998 Irish Open, and 3–5 by James Wattana in the last 32 of the 1998 Thailand Masters, Wattana's home event. Several more last-32 runs ensured that Jones would finish the season in the highest position of his career, 33rd in the world.

Now an established top-64 player, Jones reached the quarter-final of the 2000 Welsh Open, defeating Jamie Burnett, Jimmy Michie and Drew Henry before losing 1–5 to Higgins, who would go on to win the tournament.

The highlight of season 2000/2001 for Jones was a run to the last 16 of the 2000 China Open; there, he lost 3–5 to Henry.

After reaching the last 32 of the 2002 Scottish Open, where he lost to Dave Harold, Jones' form declined sharply once more. He failed to progress beyond the last 64 of another ranking event and, ranked 104th at the end of the 2003/2004 season, lost his professional status immediately thereafter at the age of 30.

Jones' attempts to requalify the following season were in vain. He won three matches to set up an encounter against seventeen-year-old Judd Trump in qualifying for the 2007 World Championship; Trump made two century breaks in defeating Jones 10–8 and would make his début at the Crucible later that year, but Jones did not play professionally again.

In 2016, Jones won several matches at Q-School, in another attempt to regain his professional status; in Event 1, he lost 1–4 in the last 64 to Lyu Chenwei, and at the last-32 stage in Event 2, Adam Duffy defeated him 4–3. In light of his high finishing place on the Q-School order of merit - a rankings list based on performances at both events - Jones was invited to participate in several ranking events during the 2016/2017 season. At the Riga Masters, in his first-round match, he led Morgan - by now also playing as an amateur - 3–1, but could not prevent a 3–4 loss; similar form followed in the 2016 European Masters, where David John whitewashed him 4–0.

After losing 0–6 to Jimmy Robertson in the International Championship in September 2016, Jones did not play in a tournament until the 2017 Snooker Shoot-Out, five months later; he beat Sanderson Lam 80–7 in the first round - his first win in a ranking event since 2007 - but was eliminated at the last-64 stage, 27–34 by Darryl Hill.

== Performance and rankings timeline ==
Tournament	1991/ 92	1992/ 93	1993/ 94	1994/ 95	1995/ 96	1996/ 97	1997/ 98	1998/ 99	1999/ 00	2000/ 01	2001/ 02	2002/ 03	2003/ 04	2004/ 05	2006/ 07	2016/ 17
Ranking (Note: It shows the ranking at the beginning of the season.)	(Note: New players on the Main Tour don't have a ranking.)	138	141	154	147	199	80	44	33	37	43	50	75	(Note: He was an amateur.)		
Ranking tournaments
Riga Masters	Tournament Not Held															LQ
Indian Open	Tournament Not Held															A
World Open (Note: The event was called the Grand Prix (1991/1992–2000/2001, 2004/2005, 2006/2007) and the LG Cup (2001/2002–2003/2004))	LQ	LQ	LQ	LQ	LQ	LQ	1R	LQ	LQ	2R	LQ	LQ	LQ	A	A	A
Paul Hunter Classic	Tournament Not Held													Pro-am		A
Shanghai Masters	Tournament Not Held															A
European Masters (Note: The event was called the European Open (1991/1992–1996/1997, 2001/2002–2003/2004), the Irish Open (1998/1999) and the Malta Cup (2004/2005, 2006/2007))	LQ	LQ	LQ	LQ	LQ	LQ	NH	2R	Not Held		LQ	LQ	LQ	A	A	LQ
English Open	Tournament Not Held															A
International Championship	Tournament Not Held															LQ
Northern Ireland Open	Tournament Not Held															A
UK Championship	1R	LQ	LQ	LQ	LQ	LQ	2R	1R	LQ	1R	1R	LQ	LQ	A	A	A
Scottish Open (Note: The event was called International Open (1992/1993–1996/1997) and the Players Championship (2003/2004))	NH	LQ	LQ	LQ	LQ	2R	LQ	LQ	LQ	1R	2R	LQ	LQ	Not Held		A
German Masters (Note: The event was called the German Open (1995/1996–1997/1998))	Not Held				LQ	LQ	LQ	NR	Tournament Not Held							A
World Grand Prix	Tournament Not Held															DNQ
Welsh Open	LQ	LQ	LQ	LQ	LQ	LQ	1R	1R	QF	LQ	LQ	LQ	LQ	A	A	A
Shoot-Out	Tournament Not Held															2R
Gibraltar Open	Tournament Not Held															A
Players Championship	Tournament Not Held															DNQ
China Open (Note: The event was called the China International (1997/1998–1998/1999))	Tournament Not Held						NR	1R	LQ	2R	LQ	Not Held		A	A	A
World Championship	LQ	LQ	LQ	LQ	LQ	1R	LQ	LQ	LQ	LQ	LQ	LQ	LQ	LQ	LQ	A
Non-ranking tournaments
Masters	LQ	LQ	LQ	LQ	LQ	A	LQ	LQ	LQ	LQ	LQ	LQ	LQ	A	A	A
Former ranking tournaments
Classic	LQ	Tournament Not Held														
Strachan Open	LQ	MR	NR	Tournament Not Held												
Dubai Classic (Note: The event was called the Thailand Classic (1995/1996) and the Asian Classic (1996/1997))	LQ	LQ	LQ	LQ	LQ	LQ	Tournament Not Held									
Malta Grand Prix	Not Held			Non-Ranking Event					LQ	NR	Tournament Not Held					
British Open	LQ	LQ	LQ	LQ	LQ	LQ	1R	2R	LQ	LQ	LQ	LQ	LQ	A	Not Held	
Thailand Masters (Note: The event was called the Asian Open (1991/1992–1992/1993) and the Thailand Open (1993/1994–1996/1997))	LQ	LQ	LQ	LQ	LQ	1R	LQ	1R	LQ	LQ	LQ	NR	Not Held		NR	NH
Irish Masters	Non-Ranking Event											LQ	LQ	A	NR	NH
Former non-ranking tournaments
Merseyside Professional Championship	Not Held		A	A	A	A	A	A	2R	A	1R	A	A	A	Not Held	

Performance Table Legend
LQ	lost in the qualifying draw	#R	lost in the early rounds of the tournament (WR = Wildcard round, RR = Round robin)	QF	lost in the quarter-finals
SF	lost in the semi-finals	F	lost in the final	W	won the tournament
DNQ	did not qualify for the tournament	A	did not participate in the tournament	WD	withdrew from the tournament

NH / Not Held	means an event was not held.
NR / Non-Ranking Event	means an event is/was no longer a ranking event.
R / Ranking Event	means an event is/was a ranking event.
MR / Minor-Ranking Event	means an event is/was a minor-ranking event.
PA / Pro-am Event	means an event is/was a pro-am event.
