= 2004 Premier League Snooker =

Betfair Premier League
Tournament information
- Dates: 10 January – 14 March 2004
- Country: United Kingdom
- Organisation: Matchroom Sport
- Format: Non-ranking event
- Total prize fund: £180,000
- Winner's share: £45,000
- Highest break: Paul Hunter (ENG) (146)

Final
- Champion: (Scotland) Stephen Hendry
- Runner-up: (Scotland) John Higgins
- Score: 9–6

The 2004 Betfair Premier League was a professional non-ranking snooker tournament that was played from 10 January to 14 March 2004.

Stephen Hendry won in the final 9–6 against John Higgins.

== Prize fund ==
The breakdown of prize money for this year is shown below:

- Winner: £45,000
- Runner-up: £20,000
- Semi-final: £12,500
- Frame-win: £500 (only in league phase)
- Highest break: £6,000
- Total: £180,000

== League phase ==
Ranking		(Scotland) HIG	(Scotland) HEN	(Wales) WIL	(Hong Kong) FU	(England) HUN	(England) WHI	(England) DAV	Frame W-L	Match W-D-L	Pld-Pts
1	John Higgins	x	2	4	6	6	5	5	28–20	4–1–1	6–9
2	Mark Williams	6	x	4	3	4	6	5	28–20	3–2–1	6–8
3	Stephen Hendry	4	4	x	5	5	3	7	28–20	3–2–1	6–8
4	Marco Fu	2	5	3	x	5	5	6	26–22	4–0–2	6–8
5	Paul Hunter	2	4	3	3	x	4	5	21–27	1–2–3	6–4
6	Jimmy White	3	2	5	3	4	x	3	20–28	1–1–4	6–3
7	Steve Davis	3	3	1	2	3	5	x	17–31	1–0–5	6–2

Top four qualified for the play-offs. If points were level then most frames won determined their positions. If two players had an identical record then the result in their match determined their positions. If that ended 4–4 then the player who got to four first was higher. (Breaks above 50 shown between (parentheses); century breaks are indicated with bold.)

- 10 January – Legends Sports Centre, Crewe, England
  - Mark Williams 6–2 John Higgins → 19–91, 0-(143), 62–32, 58–2, (52) 74–0, (103) 114–0, (114)-14, (50) 66–6
  - Stephen Hendry 7–1 Steve Davis → (84)-14, (59) 82–18, (105) 127–7, 5–70 (62), (55) 103–21, 84–0, (62) 63–0, (61) 62–20
- 11 January – Legends Sports Centre, Crewe, England
  - Marco Fu 5–3 Jimmy White → 69–65, (56) 61–41, 61–46, (62)-61, (85)-32, 56–63, 46–49, 20–72
  - Paul Hunter 5–3 Steve Davis → 77–43, 43–71 (50), 0–108 (102), (52) 73–1, 83–26, 62–50, 11–81 (80), (90)-37
  - Mark Williams 4–4 Stephen Hendry → 51–72, (90)-0, 55–67, 67–42, 58–23, (57)-(69), (84)-0, 24-(106)
- 17 January – Greenock Sports Centre, Renfrew, Scotland
  - Stephen Hendry 5–3 Paul Hunter → 75–52, 83–0, (64)-(66), 17–96 (65), 70–1, (56) 63–62, 0-(83), 66–23
  - Steve Davis 5–3 Jimmy White → 0-(86), 59–32, 67–24, 63–48, (94)-1, 45–70 (50), (79) 84–0, 30–73 (68)
  - John Higgins 6–2 Marco Fu → (68) 76–1, 64–0, 89–37, 66-(51), 66–54, 32–94, 74–20, 1-(106)
- 18 January – Greenock Sports Centre, Renfrew, Scotland
  - Mark Williams 4–4 Paul Hunter → 0–60, 70–52, 72–37, (73) 86–11, (91)-0, 34–68, 0-(141), 1-(72)
  - John Higgins 5–3 Steve Davis → 75–14, 1–113 (104), 33–68, 0–66 (58), (65) 73–14, (75)-0, (64) 73–7, 67–66
  - Jimmy White 5–3 Stephen Hendry → (64) 98–15, 66–8, (68) 90–4, (72)-9, 1–117 (116), 2–64, 75–37, 42–65
- 14 February – Civic Hall, Trowbridge, England
  - Stephen Hendry 5–3 Marco Fu → (76)-0, (92)-12, (72)-60, (73) 80–68, 0-(91), 59–1, 18–66, 28–61 (56)
  - John Higgins 5–3 Jimmy White → 0–89 (62), 12–93 (64), 8–70, (110)-0, (88)-32, 86–34, (53) 58–22, 66–6
- 15 February – Civic Hall, Trowbridge, England
  - Mark Williams 6–2 Jimmy White → 70–6, 0-(83), 17–86 (63), (53) 99–11, (84)-15, (77) 78–0, (67)-14, (84) 120–0
  - Marco Fu 6–2 Steve Davis → 11–81, (123)-9, 66–1, (140)-0, (74, 56) 130–4, (100)-0, 48–85 (76), (79)-0
  - John Higgins 6–2 Paul Hunter → 5–88 (64), (80)-0, (73)-21, (135)-4, (96)-0, 70-(56), 67–66 (62), 7-(120)
- 21 February – Peterlee Leisure Centre, Peterlee, England
  - Marco Fu 5–3 Mark Williams → (96) 101–0, (66) 74–53, 56–70, (120)-0, (129) 133–12, 25–66, 43–65 (64), (59) 65–13
  - Paul Hunter 4–4 Jimmy White → 39–72, (51) 88–47, 76-(58), (54)-74 (66), 71–34, 1–116 (109), (94)-0, 9–78
- 22 February – Peterlee Leisure Centre, Peterlee, England
  - Mark Williams 5–3 Steve Davis → 48–58, 64–56, (94) 123–8, (118) 124–0, 64–61 (52), (75) 99–0, 13–61, 23–58
  - Marco Fu 5–3 Paul Hunter → 0-(135), (73) 81–15, 61–6, 45–79, (70) 81–15, (102)-36, 0-(146), (120)-13
  - Stephen Hendry 4–4 John Higgins → 53–64, (76) 82–24, (53) 77–33, (88)-0, 5–105 (97), 40–76, 0–101 (90), 84- 15

== Play-offs ==
13–14 March – Colwyn Bay Leisure Centre, Colwyn Bay, Wales

Semi-finals; Best of 11 frames
1	(Scotland) John Higgins*	6
4	(Hong Kong) Marco Fu	1
2	(Scotland) Stephen Hendry**	6
3	(Wales) Mark Williams	4

Final; Best of 17 frames
1	(Scotland) John Higgins	6
2	(Scotland) Stephen Hendry***	9

*(80)-1, (79)-9, (68)-16, (85) 94–27, 0–77, 77–4, (81) 104–0
**21–65, (83)-0, (89) 90–1, (64)-65, (81) 104–0, 56–14, 17–76, (95)-40, 45–64, 53–52 (50)
***60-(62), (134)-0, 33–95 (70), 0-(88), (52) 66–4, 0–87 (86), 0-(80), (74) 78–4, 1–71 (70), 27–56 (55), 80–0, 18-(83), (67) 73–7, (69)-(59), 24–81 (57)

== Century breaks ==
The highest break was worth £6,000.

- 146, 141, 135, 120 – Paul Hunter
- 143, 135, 134, 110 – John Higgins
- 140, 129, 123, 120, 120, 106, 102, 100 – Marco Fu
- 116, 106, 105 – Stephen Hendry
- 118, 114, 103 – Mark Williams
- 109 – Jimmy White
- 104, 102 – Steve Davis
