= Paul Hunter =

English snooker player (1978–2006)

Personal information
- Nickname: Beckham of the Baize
- Born: 14 October 1978 Leeds, England
- Died: 9 October 2006 (aged 27) Huddersfield, England

Sport
- Country: England
- Sport: Snooker
- Professional: 1995–2006
- Highest ranking: 4 (2004–05)
- Century breaks: 114

Tournament wins
- Ranking: 3

Paul Alan Hunter (14 October 1978 – 9 October 2006) was an English professional snooker player. He was a three-time Masters champion, winning the event in 2001, 2002, and 2004; on all three occasions, he recovered from a deficit in the final to claim the title on a deciding frame. He also won three ranking events: the Welsh Open in 1998 and 2002, and the 2002 British Open.

Hunter was diagnosed with neuroendocrine tumours in March 2005, but he continued to play for several months after receiving the diagnosis. He died shortly before his 28th birthday in October 2006. A tournament in Fürth, Germany, was renamed the Paul Hunter Classic in his memory, and he was posthumously awarded the BBC Sports Personality of the Year Helen Rollason Award. In April 2016, the Masters trophy was renamed the Paul Hunter Trophy. He made 114 century breaks in professional competition, the highest of these a 146 in the 2004 Premier League tournament. During the 2004‍–‍05 season, Hunter attained a career-high ranking of world number four.

== Early life ==
Paul Alan Hunter was born on 14 October 1978 in Leeds, England, where he attended the Cardinal Heenan High School. Hunter played alongside his father, Alan, at a young age and won many amateur junior events, including the English Doubles Championship, which he won aged 14 with fellow Yorkshireman Richard Brooke. After leaving school at 14 to spend more time playing snooker, he often travelled to Bradford to practise alongside professional players such as Joe Johnson. Hunter was the runner-up at the 1995 English Amateur Championship, losing 7‍–‍8 to David Gray in the final. He made his professional debut in July 1995 at age 16, with the help of his mentors Johnson and Jimmy Michie.

== Career ==
=== Early career (1995–2000) ===
Four months after making his professional debut, Hunter reached the second round of the 1995 UK Championship by defeating Alan McManus, the sixth highest ranked player in the snooker world rankings, 9‍–‍4. Aged 17, he reached the semi-finals of the 1996 Welsh Open, the youngest player to appear at this stage of a ranking event, by defeating the world champion Stephen Hendry in the last 16. He also reached the quarter-finals of the 1996 UK Championship, where he completed a whitewash of Willie Thorne 9‍–‍0, and bested James Wattana 9‍–‍5 and Terry Murphy 9‍–‍7, before losing 5‍–‍9 against Hendry, the eventual winner of the event. Due in part to this performance, Hunter was awarded a wildcard to play at the 1997 Masters, where he lost 1‍–‍5 against Mark Williams in the first round. He reached the last 16 stage of the 1997 Grand Prix, but was later disqualified for testing positive for cannabis. He was fined £4,550 and docked the entirety of the ranking points he had earned at the event.

The following year, Hunter won his first ranking tournament at the 1998 Welsh Open; after eliminating Paul Wykes 5‍–‍3, Neal Foulds 5‍–‍2, Steve Davis 5‍–‍3, Nigel Bond 5‍–‍4, Alan McManus 5‍–‍3, and Peter Ebdon 6‍–‍1, he defeated John Higgins 9‍–‍5 in the final. Hunter trailed 2‍–‍4 but won seven frames from the next eight to win the match and the Welsh Open title. He also reached the semi-finals of the 1998 UK Championship, defeating both Jimmy White and Davis, before losing to Higgins. For 1998, he was named the Snooker Writers Association's Young Player of the Year.

Hunter played in the main stage of the World Snooker Championship for the first time in 1999, after qualifying against Euan Henderson. He then lost 8‍–‍10 in the first round to Hendry, the eventual champion. Hunter's performance that season elevated him to 12th in the 1999‍–‍2000 world rankings, allowing him automatic qualification into the final stages of ranking events for the first time. He retained his good form for the 2000‍–‍01 season, reaching at least the quarter-final stage in five ranking tournaments: he was a runner-up at the 2001 Welsh Open, a semi-finalist at the British Open and Scottish Open, and a quarter-finalist at the Grand Prix and China Open.

=== Masters winner (2001–2004) ===
Ranked amongst the world's top 16 players in 2000‍–‍01, Hunter gained entry into the invitational Masters tournament. At the 2001 Masters, he eliminated the defending champion Matthew Stevens 6‍–‍5 in the first round, Peter Ebdon 6‍–‍3 in the quarter-finals, and Stephen Hendry 6‍–‍4 in the semi-finals. He then met Fergal O'Brien in the final; Hunter trailed 3‍–‍7 but won seven of the next nine frames to win 10‍–‍9. After winning the Masters title, Hunter claimed that he and his fiancée had had sex during the break between the sessions, when he was trailing 2‍–‍6, which had caused him to play significantly better.

At the following year's Masters, he defeated Stephen Lee 6‍–‍3, Ebdon 6‍–‍5 and Alan McManus 6‍–‍5 to reach the final, where he met Mark Williams. Despite losing the first five frames of the final, Hunter won the match and tournament on a deciding frame 10‍–‍9. He was only the third player to retain the Masters title, after Cliff Thorburn (1985‍–‍1986) and Hendry (1989‍–‍1993). Hunter won his second ranking event the same year, defeating Ken Doherty 9‍–‍2 in the final to win the 2002 Welsh Open. He lost to Quinten Hann in the first round of the 2002 World Championship. In November, he defeated Ian McCulloch 9‍–‍4 in the final of the 2002 British Open to win the third ranking event of his career. As the defending champion at the 2003 Masters, Hunter progressed to the semi-finals but lost 3‍–‍6 to Williams.

Hunter progressed past the second round of the World Championship for the first time in 2003. He defeated Ali Carter 10‍–‍5, Stevens 13‍–‍6 and defending champion Ebdon 13‍–‍12 to reach the semi-finals. In the best-of-33 frames semi-final, Hunter established an overnight lead of 15‍–‍9 over opponent Doherty. Despite leading by six frames, he won only one of the remaining nine, and lost 16‍–‍17. Years later, the BBC broadcast the highlights of the match alongside other memorable matches in place of the 2020 World Championship, which was postponed because of the COVID-19 pandemic in the United Kingdom. Hunter's progress in the World Championship helped earn him a place in the world's top eight in the 2003‍–‍04 rankings for the first time in his career, having been ranked number nine for the previous two seasons.

In 2003–04, Hunter won the Masters for the third time in four years. He trailed Ronnie O'Sullivan throughout the final, with scores of 1‍–‍6, 2‍–‍7, 6‍–‍8, and 7‍–‍9, but took the remaining three frames to win 10‍–‍9. Hunter compiled five century breaks in the match. The 2004 Masters final was voted one of the best matches of all time by Eurosport in 2020. Hunter reached his last ranking event final at the 2004 Players Championship, but lost 7‍–‍9 against Jimmy White. At the 2004 Premier League Snooker event, he made the highest break of his career, a 146 in a 3‍–‍5 loss to Marco Fu. He reached the second round of the 2004 World Championship, where he lost 12‍–‍13 against Stevens, despite leading 10‍–‍6 and 12‍–‍10.

Hunter began the 2004–05 season by reaching the semi-finals of the Grand Prix, where he lost 3‍–‍6 to O'Sullivan. He won the 2004 Fürth Grand Prix, a pro-am competition, defeating Stevens 4‍–‍2 in the final; the event was later renamed in Hunter's honour. He reached the quarter-finals of the 2005 China Open in March 2005, just days after being diagnosed with cancer. His career-high ranking was world number four during 2004‍–‍05, which dropped to number five the following season.

=== Later years and illness (2005–2006) ===
In April 2005, Hunter was diagnosed with malignant neuroendocrine tumours in his stomach, a rare disease, the cause of which is unknown. A spokesperson for the World Professional Billiards and Snooker Association (WPBSA) said at the time: "Paul will undergo treatment to cure himself of this illness. He would like to reassure his fans and supporters that, as with his snooker career, he is tenacious and positive in his fight against the disease." Hunter received chemotherapy for his illness.

Hunter returned to the circuit for the start of the 2005–06 season but lost to Rory McLeod in the first round of the Grand Prix. Hunter's next match of the season was at the 2005 UK Championship against Jamie Burnett, in which Hunter came back from 6‍–‍8 down to win the match 9‍–‍8. Despite this, Hunter lost in the next round 2‍–‍9 against eventual champion Ding Junhui. He lost in the first round of the 2006 World Championship 5–10 to Neil Robertson, which was his last professional match.

Slipping from 5th to 34th in the 2006‍–‍07 rankings, Hunter admitted he played worse than the previous year and confirmed that he had been in continuous pain. Following a members' vote on 27 July 2006, the WPBSA announced its rules would be changed to allow Hunter to sit out the entire 2006–07 snooker season with his world ranking frozen at 34. Hunter intended to devote the year to treatment for his cancer.

== Personal life ==
Hunter married Lindsey Fell, a beauty therapist, in August 2004 in Jamaica. The couple had one daughter, born on 26 December 2005. After his death, Lindsey wrote the memoir Unbreakable: My Life with Paul – a Story of Extraordinary Courage and Love, covering his snooker career, his personal life and his death. Hunter became known as the "Beckham of the Baize", a reference to footballer David Beckham.

== Death and legacy ==
Hunter died on 9 October 2006, aged 27, at the Kirkwood Hospice in Huddersfield. Prior to the Premier League Snooker matches on 12 October 2006, players, referees and commentators stood for a moment of silence to remember Hunter. His funeral took place on 19 October 2006 at Leeds Parish Church. Many snooker players attended the ceremony, and his best friend, Matthew Stevens, was a pallbearer at the service.

Following his death, fellow professionals Stephen Hendry, Mark Williams, Jimmy White, Matthew Stevens and Ken Doherty led immediate calls for the Masters trophy to be named in Hunter's memory. The idea was ruled out at the time, but in 2007 the then-non-ranking Fürth German Open, a tournament first won by Hunter in 2004, was renamed the Paul Hunter Classic in his honour. The same year, the amateur English Open tournament was renamed the Paul Hunter English Open. On 20 April 2016, the World Snooker chairman Barry Hearn committed to renaming the Masters trophy in Hunter's honour, stating that the organisation had "messed up" by not doing so sooner.

Hunter was posthumously awarded the BBC Sports Personality of the Year Helen Rollason Award in 2006, and his widow Lindsey accepted the award on his behalf. A registered charity called The Paul Hunter Foundation was set up after his death with the "specific aim of giving disadvantaged, able bodied and disabled youngsters an opportunity to play snooker".

Noted for his "flamboyant" and "fluent" style by snooker commentator Clive Everton, Hunter was also described as being unfazed by bad luck or playing conditions by commentator Phil Yates, and Barry Hearn said that Hunter's "mercurial talent" was a "sad loss" to the sport. Over his 11-year professional career, Hunter's total prize money was £1.53 million. He compiled 114 century breaks in professional competition, including a high break of 146.

== Performance and rankings timeline ==
Career event results
Tournaments	1995– 96	1996– 97	1997– 98	1998– 99	1999– 00	2000– 01	2001– 02	2002– 03	2003– 04	2004– 05	2005– 06
Rankings	(Note: New players on the tour do not have a ranking.)	78	43	24	12	14	9	9	8	4	5
Ranking tournaments
Grand Prix (Note: The event was also called the LG Cup (2001/2002-2003/2004))	LQ	1R	3R	2R	3R	QF	3R	QF	3R	SF	1R
UK Championship	2R	QF	1R	SF	2R	2R	3R	3R	QF	3R	3R
Malta Cup (Note: The event was also called the European Open (1995/1996-1996/1997 and 2001/2002-2003/2004) and Irish Open (1998/1999))	LQ	LQ	NH	2R	Not Held		1R	QF	2R	1R	1R
Welsh Open	SF	LQ	W	2R	3R	F	W	SF	QF	2R	2R
China Open (Note: The event was also called the China International (1998/1999))	Not Held		NR	1R	1R	QF	2R	Not Held		QF	1R
World Championship	LQ	LQ	LQ	1R	1R	2R	1R	SF	2R	1R	1R
Non-ranking tournaments
Pot Black	Tournament Not Held										SF
Premier League	A	A	A	A	A	A	A	A	RR	RR	A
The Masters	A	WR	A	A	1R	W	W	SF	W	1R	1R
Former ranking tournaments
Asian Classic (Note: The event also ran under the name Thailand Classic (1995/1996))	LQ	LQ	Tournament Not Held								
German Open	LQ	LQ	LQ	NR	Tournament Not Held						
Malta Grand Prix	Non-Ranking Event				1R	NR	Tournament Not Held				
Thailand Masters (Note: The event also ran under the name Thailand Open (1995/1996–1996/1997))	1R	1R	LQ	1R	2R	1R	2R	Tournament Not Held			
Scottish Open (Note: The event ran under different names such as International Open (1995/1996-1996/1997) and Players Championship (2003/2004))	LQ	LQ	3R	QF	1R	SF	2R	2R	F	Not Held	
British Open	LQ	LQ	LQ	2R	3R	SF	2R	W	QF	2R	NH
Irish Masters	Non-Ranking Event							SF	2R	2R	NH
Former non-ranking tournaments
Pontins Professional	A	A	A	QF	SF	Tournament Not Held					
Malta Grand Prix	A	A	A	A	R	RR	Tournament Not Held				
Champions Cup	A	A	A	A	A	A	RR	Tournament Not Held			
Irish Masters	A	A	A	A	A	A	1R	Ranking Event			NH
Scottish Masters	A	A	A	1R	LQ	A	1R	QF	Not Held		

Performance Table Legend
LQ	lost in the qualifying draw	#R	lost in the early rounds of the tournament (WR = Wildcard round, RR = Round robin)	QF	lost in the quarter-finals
SF	lost in the semi–finals	F	lost in the final	W	won the tournament
A	did not participate in the tournament				

NH / Not Held	event was not held.
NR / Non-Ranking Event	event is/was no longer a ranking event.
R / Ranking Event	event is/was a ranking event.

== Career finals ==
=== Ranking finals: 5 (3 titles) ===
Outcome	No.	Year	Championship	Opponent in the final	Score	Ref.
Winner	1.	1998	Welsh Open	(Scotland) John Higgins	9–5	
Runner-up	1.	2001	Welsh Open	(Republic of Ireland) Ken Doherty	2–9	
Winner	2.	2002	Welsh Open (2)	(Republic of Ireland) Ken Doherty	9–7	
Winner	3.	2002	British Open	(England) Ian McCulloch	9–4	
Runner-up	2.	2004	Players Championship	(England) Jimmy White	7–9	

=== Non-ranking finals: 3 (3 titles) ===
Legend
The Masters (3–0)

Outcome	No.	Year	Championship	Opponent in the final	Score	Ref.
Winner	1.	2001	The Masters	(Republic of Ireland) Fergal O'Brien	10–9	
Winner	2.	2002	The Masters (2)	(Wales) Mark Williams	10–9	
Winner	3.	2004	The Masters (3)	(England) Ronnie O'Sullivan	10–9	

=== Pro-am finals: 1 (1 title) ===
Outcome	No.	Year	Championship	Opponent in the final	Score	Ref.
Winner	1.	2004	Grand Prix Fürth	(Wales) Matthew Stevens	4–2	

=== Amateur finals: 6 (4 titles) ===
Outcome	No.	Year	Championship	Opponent in the final	Score	Ref.
Winner	1.	1992	Pontins Junior Championship	(England) David Gray	3–0	
Runner-up	1.	1992	British Under-18 Championship	(England) Stephen Lee	2–4	
Winner	2.	1993	Pontins Junior Championship	(Wales) Matthew Stevens	4–2	
Winner	3.	1993	Pontins Star of the Future	(England) John Whitty	3–2	
Winner	4.	1995	English Under-17 Championship	(England) David Gray	5–4	
Runner-up	2.	1995	English Amateur Championship	(England) David Gray	7–8	
