= 1998 Welsh Open (snooker) =

1998 Regal Welsh Open
Tournament information
- Dates: 16–25 January 1998
- Venue: Newport Leisure Centre
- City: Newport
- Country: Wales
- Organisation: WPBSA
- Format: Ranking event
- Total prize fund: £350,000
- Winner's share: £60,000
- Highest break: Graeme Dott (SCO) (142)

Final
- Champion: Paul Hunter (ENG)
- Runner-up: John Higgins (SCO)
- Score: 9–5

The 1998 Welsh Open (officially the 1998 Regal Welsh Open) was a professional ranking snooker tournament that took place between 16 and 25 January 1998 at the Newport Leisure Centre in Newport, Wales.

Stephen Hendry was the defending champion, but he lost in the first round against Jamie Burnett.

Paul Hunter defeated John Higgins 9–5 in the final to win his first ranking title.

== Main draw ==
Last 64; Best of 9 frames
(England) Paul Hunter	5
(England) Neal Foulds	2
(England) Steve Davis	5
(England) Dave Finbow	3
(England) Nigel Bond	5
(England) Ian Brumby	0
(England) Jason Ferguson	5
(Scotland) Billy Snaddon	3
(Scotland) Alan McManus	5
(England) Joe Johnson	0
(Scotland) Martin Dziewialtowski	5
(England) Mick Price	3
(Scotland) Chris Small	5
(England) David Roe	3
(England) Nick Walker	5
(Wales) Mark Williams	3
(England) Peter Ebdon	5
(England) Stuart Pettman	4
(England) Gary Wilkinson	5
(England) John Read	2
(Republic of Ireland) Fergal O'Brien	5
(Wales) Wayne Jones	4
(England) Steve Judd	5
(Malta) Tony Drago	3
(Scotland) Jamie Burnett	5
(Scotland) Stephen Hendry	4
(England) Joe Perry	5
(England) Brian Morgan	4
(England) Stephen Lee	5
(Scotland) Marcus Campbell	4
(England) Peter Lines	5
(England) Rod Lawler	0
(Scotland) John Higgins	5
(Scotland) Euan Henderson	2
(Northern Ireland) Terry Murphy	5
(England) Bradley Jones	4
(England) Andy Hicks	5
(England) Tony Jones	3
(England) Stefan Mazrocis	5
(Canada) Alain Robidoux	3
(England) John Parrott	5
(Wales) Paul Davies	3
(England) Ian McCulloch	5
(England) Martin Clark	1
(Scotland) Graeme Dott	5
(Thailand) James Wattana	4
(England) Steve James	5
(Northern Ireland) Gerard Greene	1
(England) Mark King	5
(England) Gary Ponting	1
(Wales) Tony Chappel	5
(Republic of Ireland) Ken Doherty	3
(Wales) Dominic Dale	5
(Northern Ireland) Joe Swail	4
(England) Sean Storey	5
(Wales) Darren Morgan	4
(England) Anthony Hamilton	5
(Wales) Matthew Stevens	1
(England) Dave Harold	5
(England) Wayne Brown	1
(England) Ronnie O'Sullivan	5
(Republic of Ireland) Stephen O'Connor	1
(England) Jimmy White	5
(England) Mark Davis	2

Last 32; Best of 9 frames
(England) Paul Hunter	5
(England) Steve Davis	3
(England) Nigel Bond	5
(England) Jason Ferguson	0
(Scotland) Alan McManus	5
(Scotland) Martin Dziewialtowski	1
(Scotland) Chris Small	5
(England) Nick Walker	1
(England) Peter Ebdon	5
(England) Gary Wilkinson	0
(Republic of Ireland) Fergal O'Brien	5
(England) Steve Judd	3
(Scotland) Jamie Burnett	5
(England) Joe Perry	3
(England) Stephen Lee	5
(England) Peter Lines	1
(Scotland) John Higgins	5
(Northern Ireland) Terry Murphy	1
(England) Andy Hicks	5
(England) Stefan Mazrocis	1
(England) John Parrott	5
(England) Ian McCulloch	1
(Scotland) Graeme Dott	5
(England) Steve James	2
(England) Mark King	5
(Wales) Tony Chappel	2
(Wales) Dominic Dale	5
(England) Sean Storey	3
(England) Anthony Hamilton	5
(England) Dave Harold	2
(England) Ronnie O'Sullivan	5
(England) Jimmy White	4

Last 16; Best of 9 frames
(England) Paul Hunter	5
(England) Nigel Bond	4
(Scotland) Alan McManus	5
(Scotland) Chris Small	0
(England) Peter Ebdon	5
(Republic of Ireland) Fergal O'Brien	3
(Scotland) Jamie Burnett	5
(England) Stephen Lee	3
(Scotland) John Higgins	5
(England) Andy Hicks	3
(England) John Parrott	5
(Scotland) Graeme Dott	1
(England) Mark King	5
(Wales) Dominic Dale	1
(England) Anthony Hamilton	5
(England) Ronnie O'Sullivan	4

Quarter-finals; Best of 9 frames
(England) Paul Hunter	5
(Scotland) Alan McManus	3
(England) Peter Ebdon	5
(Scotland) Jamie Burnett	2
(Scotland) John Higgins	5
(England) John Parrott	4
(England) Mark King	5
(England) Anthony Hamilton	3

Semi-finals; Best of 11 frames
(England) Paul Hunter	6
(England) Peter Ebdon	1
(Scotland) John Higgins	6
(England) Mark King	5

Final; Best of 17 frames
(England) Paul Hunter	9
(Scotland) John Higgins	5

== Final ==
Final: Best of 17 frames. Referee: Eirian Williams. Newport Leisure Centre, Newport, Wales, 25 January 1998.
Paul Hunter; England	9–5	John Higgins; Scotland
Afternoon: 40–87 (87), 131–1 (127), 44–81 (63), 116–0 (116), 0–88 (55), 26–62, 76–21, 61–8; Evening: 10–69 (52), 64–20, 73–34, 68–41, 74–8 (74), 108–0 (108)
127	Highest break	87
3	Century breaks	0
4	50+ breaks	4
