= Welsh Open (snooker) =

Snooker tournament

- Part of the Home Nations Series

Tournament information
- Venue: Venue Cymru
- Location: Llandudno
- Country: Wales
- Established: 1992
- Organisation(s): World Snooker Tour
- Format: Ranking event
- Total prize fund: £550,400
- Winner's share: £100,000
- Recent edition: 2026
- Current champion: Barry Hawkins (ENG)

The Welsh Open is a professional ranking snooker tournament that has been held annually since 1992. It replaced the Welsh Professional Championship, which ran annually from 1980 to 1991 and was open only to Welsh players. The Welsh Open is now the longest running ranking event after the World Championship and the UK Championship. Since the 2016–17 season, it has been one of four tournaments in the Home Nations Series, alongside the Northern Ireland Open, the Scottish Open, and the English Open. Since 2017, the winner of the event has received the Ray Reardon Trophy, named after the Welsh six-time world champion. Reardon himself presented the newly named trophy to 2017 winner Stuart Bingham.

Mark Williams is the only Welsh winner, having captured the title in 1996 and 1999. John Higgins holds the record for the most Welsh Open wins, claiming the title five times. Barry Hawkins is the reigning champion.

== History ==
The tournament began as a ranking tournament in 1992. It is now the third-longest-running ranking event on the World Snooker Tour, after the World Championship and the UK Championship. The event trophy was renamed the Ray Reardon Trophy; Reardon himself presented the first trophy bearing his name to the 2017 winner Stuart Bingham.

In the 2016–17 season, the event became part of the Home Nations Series, alongside the English Open, Northern Ireland Open and Scottish Open. From season 2021-22 to season 2023-24 the Welsh Open was included in the European Series and as the last tournament in that series, these Welsh Open editions had the extra interest of being the tournament where the European Series championship and it's associated Betvictor winner's bonus was decided. That bonus is won by the player with the highest aggregate winnings across the series. When the European Series was then discontinued, the Betvictor bonus was transferred to the Home Nations Series from the 2024-25 season, so since then the Welsh Open as the last Home Nations tournament each season, has had the extra interest of being the tournament during which the Home Nations champion and the associated Betvictor £150,000 bonus is decided.

The event was sponsored by Regal until 2003, but UK restrictions on tobacco advertising meant that it was without a sponsor until 2009. The tournament was sponsored by Totesport.com in 2010, by Wyldecrest Park Homes in 2011, by 888真人 in 2012, and by BetVictor from to 2013 to 2016. In 2017 the tournament was sponsored by Coral.

In 1996, Paul Hunter reached the semi-finals at the age of 17 years and 111 days, becoming the youngest player to reach this stage of a ranking tournament.

John Higgins holds the record for the most Welsh Open titles, having won the event on 5 occasions. The other multiple winners are Ronnie O'Sullivan with 4 victories, Stephen Hendry with 3, and Steve Davis, Ken Doherty, Paul Hunter, Mark Williams and Neil Robertson with 2 wins each.

Like the Welsh Professional Championship, it was played at the Newport Centre in Newport, before moving to the Cardiff International Arena in 1999. It was moved back to Newport in 2005, where it remained until 2014. In January 2014, World Snooker chairman Barry Hearn announced that the 2014 tournament would be the last held in Newport, and that he would open negotiations to move the event to a larger venue, most likely in Cardiff. The event was held at the Motorpoint Arena in Cardiff from 2015 to 2020, before moving back to Newport in 2021 and 2022. The event was first held at its current venue Llandudno in 2023.

The tournament is broadcast by BBC Wales, Eurosport, CCTV, SMG, Now TV and Showtime Arabia. In the early days it was televised by both BBC Wales (in English), S4C (in Welsh) and Sky Sports.

There have been twelve maximum breaks in the history of the tournament.

- The first was made by Ronnie O'Sullivan in 1999, against James Wattana.
- The second was made at the qualifying stage of the 2000 event by Barry Pinches, against Joe Johnson.
- The third was made by Andrew Higginson in 2007, against Ali Carter.
- The fourth 147 was made in 2011 by Stephen Hendry, against Stephen Maguire. This was Hendry's 10th 147 break, and with this he equalled the record for most maximums with Ronnie O'Sullivan. He also became the oldest player at the time to compile a maximum break at the age of 42 years and 35 days.
- The fifth maximum was made by O'Sullivan in 2014, in the last frame of the final against Ding Junhui. This was O'Sullivan's 12th 147 break, and with it he set the record for most maximums. It was also the last maximum to be compiled before the event moved to Cardiff.
- Ding Junhui made the sixth at the quarter-finals of the 2016 tournament, against Neil Robertson.
- Two maximum breaks were made at the 2019 event, one by Neil Robertson in the first round, against Jordan Brown, and one by Noppon Saengkham in the third round, against Mark Selby.
- The ninth maximum was made in 2020 by Kyren Wilson on his first visit to the table in his first round match against Jackson Page.
- Shaun Murphy made the tenth maximum break in 2023 in his third round match against Daniel Wells.
- The eleventh maximum break was compiled by Gary Wilson in 2024, during the semi-final against Higgins.
- The most recent maximum break was made by Xu Si in the second round of qualifying of the 2025 tournament against Bulcsú Révész.

In the first round of the 2026 Open, Chang Bingyu played a 'perfect match' where he did not miss one pot and so recorded a record 100% pot success rate while making 4 consecutive century breaks in his 4-0 whitewash of Shaun Murphy.

== Winners ==
Year	Winner	Runner-up	Final score	Venue	City	Season
1992	Stephen Hendry (SCO)	Darren Morgan (WAL)	9–3	Newport Centre	Newport	1991/92
1993	Ken Doherty (IRL)	Alan McManus (SCO)	9–7	Newport Centre	Newport	1992/93
1994	Steve Davis (ENG)	Alan McManus (SCO)	9–6	Newport Centre	Newport	1993/94
1995	Steve Davis (ENG)	John Higgins (SCO)	9–3	Newport Centre	Newport	1994/95
1996	Mark Williams (WAL)	John Parrott (ENG)	9–3	Newport Centre	Newport	1995/96
1997	Stephen Hendry (SCO)	Mark King (ENG)	9–2	Newport Centre	Newport	1996/97
1998	Paul Hunter (ENG)	John Higgins (SCO)	9–5	Newport Centre	Newport	1997/98
1999	Mark Williams (WAL)	Stephen Hendry (SCO)	9–8	Cardiff International Arena	Cardiff	1998/99
2000	John Higgins (SCO)	Stephen Lee (ENG)	9–8	Cardiff International Arena	Cardiff	1999/00
2001	Ken Doherty (IRL)	Paul Hunter (ENG)	9–2	Cardiff International Arena	Cardiff	2000/01
2002	Paul Hunter (ENG)	Ken Doherty (IRL)	9–7	Cardiff International Arena	Cardiff	2001/02
2003	Stephen Hendry (SCO)	Mark Williams (WAL)	9–5	Cardiff International Arena	Cardiff	2002/03
2004	Ronnie O'Sullivan (ENG)	Steve Davis (ENG)	9–8	Welsh Institute of Sport	Cardiff	2003/04
2005	Ronnie O'Sullivan (ENG)	Stephen Hendry (SCO)	9–8	Newport Centre	Newport	2004/05
2006	Stephen Lee (ENG)	Shaun Murphy (ENG)	9–4	Newport Centre	Newport	2005/06
2007	Neil Robertson (AUS)	Andrew Higginson (ENG)	9–8	Newport Centre	Newport	2006/07
2008	Mark Selby (ENG)	Ronnie O'Sullivan (ENG)	9–8	Newport Centre	Newport	2007/08
2009	Ali Carter (ENG)	Joe Swail (NIR)	9–5	Newport Centre	Newport	2008/09
2010	John Higgins (SCO)	Ali Carter (ENG)	9–4	Newport Centre	Newport	2009/10
2011	John Higgins (SCO)	Stephen Maguire (SCO)	9–6	Newport Centre	Newport	2010/11
2012	Ding Junhui (CHN)	Mark Selby (ENG)	9–6	Newport Centre	Newport	2011/12
2013	Stephen Maguire (SCO)	Stuart Bingham (ENG)	9–8	Newport Centre	Newport	2012/13
2014	Ronnie O'Sullivan (ENG)	Ding Junhui (CHN)	9–3	Newport Centre	Newport	2013/14
2015	John Higgins (SCO)	Ben Woollaston (ENG)	9–3	Cardiff International Arena	Cardiff	2014/15
2016	Ronnie O'Sullivan (ENG)	Neil Robertson (AUS)	9–5	Cardiff International Arena	Cardiff	2015/16
2017	Stuart Bingham (ENG)	Judd Trump (ENG)	9–8	Cardiff International Arena	Cardiff	2016/17
2018	John Higgins (SCO)	Barry Hawkins (ENG)	9–7	Cardiff International Arena	Cardiff	2017/18
2019	Neil Robertson (AUS)	Stuart Bingham (ENG)	9–7	Cardiff International Arena	Cardiff	2018/19
2020	Shaun Murphy (ENG)	Kyren Wilson (ENG)	9–1	Cardiff International Arena	Cardiff	2019/20
2021	Jordan Brown (NIR)	Ronnie O'Sullivan (ENG)	9–8	Celtic Manor Resort	Newport	2020/21
2022	Joe Perry (ENG)	Judd Trump (ENG)	9–5	ICC Wales	Newport	2021/22
2023	Robert Milkins (ENG)	Shaun Murphy (ENG)	9–7	Venue Cymru	Llandudno	2022/23
2024	Gary Wilson (ENG)	Martin O'Donnell (ENG)	9–4	Venue Cymru	Llandudno	2023/24
2025	Mark Selby (ENG)	Stephen Maguire (SCO)	9–6	Venue Cymru	Llandudno	2024/25
2026	Barry Hawkins (ENG)	Jack Lisowski (ENG)	9–5	Venue Cymru	Llandudno	2025/26
2027				Venue Cymru	Llandudno	2026/27

== Statistics ==
=== Finalists ===
Name	Nationality	Winner	Runner-up	Finals
**John Higgins**	Scotland	5	2	7
**Ronnie O'Sullivan**	England	4	2	6
Stephen Hendry	Scotland	3	2	5
Steve Davis	England	2	1	3
Ken Doherty	Ireland	2	1	3
Paul Hunter	England	2	1	3
**Mark Williams**	Wales	2	1	3
**Neil Robertson**	Australia	2	1	3
**Mark Selby**	England	2	1	3
**Stuart Bingham**	England	1	2	3
**Shaun Murphy**	England	1	2	3
**Stephen Maguire**	Scotland	1	2	3
**Ali Carter**	England	1	1	2
**Ding Junhui**	China	1	1	2
Stephen Lee	England	1	1	2
**Barry Hawkins**	England	1	1	2
**Jordan Brown**	Northern Ireland	1	0	1
Joe Perry	England	1	0	1
Robert Milkins	England	1	0	1
**Gary Wilson**	England	1	0	1
Alan McManus	Scotland	0	2	2
**Judd Trump**	England	0	2	2
Andrew Higginson	England	0	1	1
Mark King	England	0	1	1
Darren Morgan	Wales	0	1	1
John Parrott	England	0	1	1
Joe Swail	Northern Ireland	0	1	1
**Ben Woollaston**	England	0	1	1
**Kyren Wilson**	England	0	1	1
**Martin O'Donnell**	England	0	1	1
**Jack Lisowski**	England	0	1	1

Legend
The names of active players are marked in **bold**.

== See also ==
- Welsh Professional Championship
