= 2001 Welsh Open (snooker) =

2001 Regal Welsh Open
Tournament information
- Dates: 24–28 January 2001
- Venue: Cardiff International Arena
- City: Cardiff
- Country: Wales
- Organisation: WPBSA
- Format: Ranking event
- Total prize fund: £440,200
- Winner's share: £62,000
- Highest break: Alan McManus (SCO) (140)

Final
- Champion: Ken Doherty (IRL)
- Runner-up: Paul Hunter (ENG)
- Score: 9–2

The 2001 Welsh Open (officially the 2001 Regal Welsh Open) was a professional ranking snooker tournament that took place between 24 and 28 January 2001 at the Cardiff International Arena in Cardiff, Wales.

John Higgins was the defending champion, but he lost his quarter-final match against Stephen Lee.

Ken Doherty defeated Paul Hunter 9–2 in the final to win his fourth ranking title.

== Prize fund ==
The breakdown of prize money for this year is shown below:

- Winner: £62,000
- Runner-up: £33,000
- Semi-finalists: £16,500
- Quarter-finalists: £9,400
- Last 16: £4,800
- Last 32: £3,900
- Last 48: £3,100
- Last 64: £2,400
- Last 96: £1,550
- Last 128: £950
- Highest break (televised): £5,000
- Highest break (untelevised): £1,000
- Total: £440,200

== Tournament summary ==
Defending champion John Higgins was the number 1 seed with World Champion Mark Williams seeded 2. The remaining places were allocated to players based on the world rankings.

== Main draw ==
Round 1 Best of 9 frames
1 | (Scotland) John Higgins | 5
21 | (Scotland) Chris Small | 1
12 | (England) Peter Ebdon | 5
(Thailand) Noppadon Noppachorn | 1
9 | (Republic of Ireland) Fergal O'Brien | 5
53 | (England) Gary Ponting | 4
5 | (England) Stephen Lee | 5
40 | (Wales) Anthony Davies | 3
6 | (Wales) Matthew Stevens | 4
31 | (England) Joe Perry | 5
14 | (England) Paul Hunter | 5
(England) Nick Walker | 0
16 | (Northern Ireland) Joe Swail | 5
33 | (Scotland) Jamie Burnett | 3
4 | (England) Ronnie O'Sullivan | 5
19 | (Scotland) Graeme Dott | 3
3 | (Scotland) Stephen Hendry | 5
52 | (England) David Gray | 3
15 | (Hong Kong) Marco Fu | 5
(England) Wayne Brown | 1
11 | (England) Anthony Hamilton | 3
32 | (Australia) Quinten Hann | 5
7 | (Republic of Ireland) Ken Doherty | 5
20 | (Wales) Dominic Dale | 3
8 | (Scotland) Alan McManus | 5
62 | (England) Michael Holt | 0
10 | (England) John Parrott | 3
29 | (Scotland) Drew Henry | 5
13 | (England) Dave Harold | 3
22 | (England) Mark King | 5
2 | (Wales) Mark Williams | 5
23 | (England) Nigel Bond | 3

Last 16; Best of 9 frames
1 | (Scotland) John Higgins | 5
12 | (England) Peter Ebdon | 3
9 | (Republic of Ireland) Fergal O'Brien | 3
5 | (England) Stephen Lee | 5
31 | (England) Joe Perry | 4
14 | (England) Paul Hunter | 5
16 | (Northern Ireland) Joe Swail | 5
4 | (England) Ronnie O'Sullivan | 4
3 | (Scotland) Stephen Hendry | 5
15 | (Hong Kong) Marco Fu | 3
32 | (Australia) Quinten Hann | 3
7 | (Republic of Ireland) Ken Doherty | 5
8 | (Scotland) Alan McManus | 5
29 | (Scotland) Drew Henry | 3
22 | (England) Mark King | 1
2 | (Wales) Mark Williams | 5

Quarter Final; Best of 9 frames
1 | (Scotland) John Higgins | 1
5 | (England) Stephen Lee | 5
14 | (England) Paul Hunter | 5
16 | (Northern Ireland) Joe Swail | 2
3 | (Scotland) Stephen Hendry | 3
7 | (Republic of Ireland) Ken Doherty | 5
8 | (Scotland) Alan McManus | 4
2 | (Wales) Mark Williams | 5

Semi Final; Best of 11 frames
5 | (England) Stephen Lee | 3
14 | (England) Paul Hunter | 6
7 | (Republic of Ireland) Ken Doherty | 6
2 | (Wales) Mark Williams | 3

Final; Best of 17 frames
14 | (England) Paul Hunter | 2
7 | (Republic of Ireland) Ken Doherty | 9

== Final ==
Final: Best of 17 frames. Referee: Graham Harding. Cardiff International Arena, Cardiff, Wales, 28 January 2001.
| Paul Hunter (14); England | 2–9 | Ken Doherty (7); Ireland |
Afternoon: 1–63, 76–1 (68), 23–77 (71), 59–0, 56–62 (52), 5–57, 51–73, 13–129 (125); Evening: 44–72, 8–99 (56), 36–85 (69)
| 68 | Highest break | 125 |
| 0 | Century breaks | 1 |
| 1 | 50+ breaks | 5 |
