= 2000 Grand Prix (snooker) =

Grand Prix
Tournament information
- Dates: 13–22 October 2000
- Venue: Telford International Centre
- City: Telford
- Country: England
- Organisation: WPBSA
- Format: Ranking event
- Total prize fund: £440,000
- Winner's share: £62,000
- Highest break: Brian Morgan (ENG) (143)

Final
- Champion: Mark Williams (WAL)
- Runner-up: Ronnie O'Sullivan (ENG)
- Score: 9–5

The 2000 Grand Prix was a professional snooker tournament and the second of eight WPBSA ranking events in the 2000/2001 season, following the British Open and preceding the UK Championship. It was held from 13 to 22 October 2000 at the Telford International Centre in Telford, England.

John Higgins was the defending champion, but he withdrew from his quarter-final match against Graeme Dott due to a family wedding. Mark Williams won his 10th ranking title by defeating Ronnie O'Sullivan 9–5 in the final.

== Prize fund ==
The breakdown of prize money for the tournament was as follows:

- Winner: £62,000
- Runner-up: £33,000
- Semi-finalists: £16,500
- Quarter-finalists: £9,400
- Last 16: £4,800
- Last 32: £3,900
- Last 48: £3,150
- Last 64: £2,400
- Last 96: £1,550
- Last 128: £950
- Highest break: £5,000
- Highest break (non-televised): £1,000
- Total: £440,000

== Tournament summary ==
Defending champion John Higgins was the number 1 seed with World Champion Mark Williams seeded 2. The remaining places were allocated to players based on the world rankings.

Despite reaching the quarter-finals, Higgins withdrew from the tournament at the quarter-final stage, giving opponent Graeme Dott a walkover into the semi-finals. Higgins was angry that his quarter-final match with Dott was to fall on the same day as his brother's wedding, despite Higgins' claim he had been assured eight months previously no such clash was to take place. World Snooker insisted no such assurances were made.

== Main draw ==
Last 48; Best of 9 frames
25	(Wales) Darren Morgan	0
(England) Paul Sweeny	5
30	(Northern Ireland) Terry Murphy	5
(England) Nick Dyson	4
19	(Scotland) Graeme Dott	5
(England) Andy Hicks	4
26	(Malta) Tony Drago	5
(Scotland) Marcus Campbell	2
20	(Wales) Dominic Dale	4
(Northern Ireland) Patrick Wallace	5
23	(England) Nigel Bond	2
(England) Bradley Jones	5
21	(Scotland) Chris Small	2
(England) Robert Milkins	5
32	(Australia) Quinten Hann	5
(Northern Ireland) Jason Prince	2
28	(England) Brian Morgan	5
(England) Matt Wilson	2
31	(England) Joe Perry	5
(Scotland) Jamie Burnett	1
18	(England) Jimmy White	5
(England) Matthew Couch	1
29	(Scotland) Drew Henry	5
(Republic of Ireland) Michael Judge	0
27	(Thailand) James Wattana	2
(England) Alfie Burden	5
17	(England) Steve Davis	5
(England) Jimmy Michie	4
22	(England) Mark King	5
(England) Eddie Manning	2
24	(Scotland) Billy Snaddon	5
(Scotland) Paul McPhillips	4

Last 32; Best of 9 frames
1	(Scotland) John Higgins	5
(England) Paul Sweeny	0
11	(England) Anthony Hamilton	w/d
30	(Northern Ireland) Terry Murphy	w/o
13	(England) Dave Harold	4
19	(Scotland) Graeme Dott	5
6	(Wales) Matthew Stevens	5
26	(Malta) Tony Drago	4
7	(Republic of Ireland) Ken Doherty	5
(Northern Ireland) Patrick Wallace	0
9	(Republic of Ireland) Fergal O'Brien	5
(England) Bradley Jones	4
10	(England) John Parrott	2
(England) Robert Milkins	5
4	(England) Ronnie O'Sullivan	5
32	(Australia) Quinten Hann	0
3	(Scotland) Stephen Hendry	2
28	(England) Brian Morgan	5
12	(England) Peter Ebdon	5
31	(England) Joe Perry	3
15	(Hong Kong) Marco Fu	3
18	(England) Jimmy White	5
8	(Scotland) Alan McManus	5
29	(Scotland) Drew Henry	3
5	(England) Stephen Lee	5
(England) Alfie Burden	1
14	(England) Paul Hunter	5
17	(England) Steve Davis	2
16	(Northern Ireland) Joe Swail	4
22	(England) Mark King	5
2	(Wales) Mark Williams	5
24	(Scotland) Billy Snaddon	3

Last 16; Best of 9 frames
1	(Scotland) John Higgins	5
30	(Northern Ireland) Terry Murphy	3
19	(Scotland) Graeme Dott	5
6	(Wales) Matthew Stevens	4
7	(Republic of Ireland) Ken Doherty	5
9	(Republic of Ireland) Fergal O'Brien	3
(England) Robert Milkins	1
4	(England) Ronnie O'Sullivan	5
28	(England) Brian Morgan	5
12	(England) Peter Ebdon	2
18	(England) Jimmy White	5
8	(Scotland) Alan McManus	4
5	(England) Stephen Lee	4
14	(England) Paul Hunter	5
22	(England) Mark King	1
2	(Wales) Mark Williams	5

Quarter-finals; Best of 9 frames
1	(Scotland) John Higgins	w/d
19	(Scotland) Graeme Dott	w/o
7	(Republic of Ireland) Ken Doherty	0
4	(England) Ronnie O'Sullivan	5
28	(England) Brian Morgan	3
18	(England) Jimmy White	5
14	(England) Paul Hunter	3
2	(Wales) Mark Williams	5

Semi-finals; Best of 11 frames
19	(Scotland) Graeme Dott	3
4	(England) Ronnie O'Sullivan	6
18	(England) Jimmy White	2
2	(Wales) Mark Williams	6

Final; Best of 17 frames
4	(England) Ronnie O'Sullivan	5
2	(Wales) Mark Williams	9

== Final ==
Final: Best of 17 frames. Referee: Colin Brinded. Telford International Centre, Telford, England, 22 October 2000.
Ronnie O'Sullivan (4); England	5–9	Mark Williams (2); Wales
Afternoon: 68–56, 32–102 (101), 111–8 (71), 17–73 (73), 6–108 (108), 17–66, 12–69 (69), 26–60; Evening: 31–94 (50), 95–0 (95), 102–4 (56), 74–50 (50, 74), 1–74, 17–79 (56)
95	Highest break	108
0	Century breaks	2
4	50+ breaks	7
