= Brian Morgan (snooker player) =

English snooker player and coach

Personal information
- Born: 16 July 1968 (age 58)

Sport
- Country: England
- Sport: Snooker
- Professional: 1989–2006
- Highest ranking: 27 (1995/1996, 1998–1999)
- Best ranking finish: Runner-up (x1)

Brian Morgan (born 16 July 1968) is an English professional snooker player and coach. He is a former World Under-21 champion and was among the top 32 players in the professional world rankings for several years.

== Career ==
He reached the last 16 of the 1994 World Championship. He also qualified for the tournament in 1993, 1995 and 1997. In 1996 he reached the final of the Asian Classic, beating Stephen Hendry before suffering a narrow 9–8 loss to Ronnie O'Sullivan. He made a 146 break in this tournament. In the same year, he won the Benson & Hedges Championship, which entitled its winner to a wild card place in the Masters. He beat Hendry again in the 2000 Grand Prix, in which he reached the quarter-finals, and reached the last 16 of the 2004 Irish Masters.

== Career finals ==
=== Ranking finals: 1 ===
Outcome	No.	Year	Championship	Opponent in the final	Score
Runner-up	1.	1996	Asian Classic	(England) Ronnie O'Sullivan	8–9

=== Non-ranking finals: 3 (2 titles) ===
Outcome	No.	Year	Championship	Opponent in the final	Score
Runner-up	1.	1996	Pakistan Masters	(Thailand) Noppadon Noppachorn	5–7
Winner	1.	1996	Benson & Hedges Championship	(Scotland) Drew Henry	9–8
Winner	2.	2001	WPBSA Open Tour – Event 2	(Republic of Ireland) Leo Fernandez	5–2

=== Pro-am finals: 1 ===
Outcome	No.	Year	Championship	Opponent in the final	Score
Runner-up	1.	2001	Pontins Spring Open	(England) Luke Simmonds	5–7

=== Amateur finals: 1 (1 title) ===
Outcome	No.	Year	Championship	Opponent in the final	Score
Winner	1.	1988	IBSF World Under-21 Championship	(Malta) Jason Peplow	6–1
