= 1994–95 snooker season =

Details
- Duration: 1 August 1994 – May 1995
- Tournaments: 22 (9 ranking events)

Triple Crown winners
- UK Championship: (Scotland) Stephen Hendry
- Masters: (England) Ronnie O'Sullivan
- World Championship: (Scotland) Stephen Hendry

The 1994–95 snooker season was a series of snooker tournaments played between August 1994 and May 1995. The following table outlines the results for ranking events and the invitational events.

== Calendar ==
| Start | Finish | Country | Tournament name | Venue | City | Winner | Runner-up | Score | Ref. |
|---|---|---|---|---|---|---|---|---|---|
| 1 Aug | 7 Aug | AUS | Australian Open | Bentleigh Club | Melbourne | (Scotland) John Higgins | (England) Willie Thorne | 9–5 | |
| 9 Sep | 14 Sep | THA | Top Rank Classic | | Hat Yai | (Scotland) Stephen Hendry | (Scotland) Alan McManus | Round-robin (Note: No play-off was held and the title was decided on league table only.) | |
| 20 Sep | 25 Sep | SCO | Scottish Masters | Civic Centre | Motherwell | (Republic of Ireland) Ken Doherty | (Scotland) Stephen Hendry | 9–7 | |
| 30 Sep | 7 Oct | UAE | Dubai Classic | Al Nasr Stadium | Dubai | (Scotland) Alan McManus | (England) Peter Ebdon | 9–6 | |
| 10 Oct | 23 Oct | ENG | Grand Prix | Assembly Rooms | Derby | (Scotland) John Higgins | (England) Dave Harold | 9–6 | |
| 28 Oct | 5 Nov | SCO | Benson & Hedges Championship | JP Snooker Centre | Edinburgh | (Wales) Mark Williams | (England) Rod Lawler | 9–5 | |
| 11 Nov | 27 Nov | ENG | UK Championship | Guild Hall | Preston | (Scotland) Stephen Hendry | (Republic of Ireland) Ken Doherty | 10–5 | |
| 28 Nov | 4 Dec | MLT | Malta Grand Prix | Jerma Palace Hotel | Valletta | (England) John Parrott | (Malta) Tony Drago | 7–6 | |
| 11 Dec | 17 Dec | BEL | European Open | Het Rool Stadium | Antwerp | (Scotland) Stephen Hendry | (England) John Parrott | 9–3 | |
| ? Dec | ? Dec | THA | King's Cup | Thai/Japan Youth Centre | Bangkok | (Scotland) Billy Snaddon | (Thailand) Noppadon Noppachorn | 8–4 | |
| 4 Jan | 8 Jan | ENG | Charity Challenge | International Convention Centre | Birmingham | (Scotland) Stephen Hendry | (Northern Ireland) Dennis Taylor | 9–1 | |
| 22 Jan | 29 Jan | WAL | Welsh Open | Newport Centre | Newport | (England) Steve Davis | (Scotland) John Higgins | 9–3 | |
| 5 Feb | 12 Feb | ENG | The Masters | Wembley Conference Centre | London | (England) Ronnie O'Sullivan | (Scotland) John Higgins | 9–3 | |
| 13 Feb | 19 Feb | ENG | International Open | Bournemouth International Centre | Bournemouth | (Scotland) John Higgins | (England) Steve Davis | 9–5 | |
| 10 Mar | 18 Mar | THA | Thailand Open | Imperial Queens Park Hotel | Bangkok | (Thailand) James Wattana | (England) Ronnie O'Sullivan | 9–6 | |
| 21 Mar | 26 Mar | IRL | Irish Masters | Goff's | Kill | (England) Peter Ebdon | (Scotland) Stephen Hendry | 9–8 | |
| 1 Apr | 9 Apr | ENG | British Open | Plymouth Pavilions | Plymouth | (Scotland) John Higgins | (England) Ronnie O'Sullivan | 9–6 | |
| 8 Apr | 20 May | ENG | Tenball | The London Studios | London | (England) Jimmy White | (England) Ronnie O'Sullivan | 3–1 | |
| 14 Apr | 30 Apr | ENG | World Snooker Championship | Crucible Theatre | Sheffield | (Scotland) Stephen Hendry | (England) Nigel Bond | 18–9 | |
| 2 May | 7 May | MLT | Malta Masters | Jerma Palace Hotel | Marsascala | (England) David Roe | (Malta) Tony Drago | 6–3 | |
| ? Jan | 7 May | ENG | European League | Diamond Centre | Irthlingborough | (Scotland) Stephen Hendry | (Republic of Ireland) Ken Doherty | 10–2 | |
| ? May | ? May | WAL | Pontins Professional | Pontins | Prestatyn | (England) Peter Ebdon | (Republic of Ireland) Ken Doherty | 9–8 | |

Ranking event
Non-ranking event

== Official rankings ==
The top 16 of the world rankings, these players automatically played in the final rounds of the world ranking events and were invited for the Masters.

| No. | Ch. | Name | Points |
|---|---|---|---|
| 1 | Steady | (Scotland) Stephen Hendry | 53300 |
| 2 | ▲ | (England) Steve Davis | 52300 |
| 3 | ▲ | (Thailand) James Wattana | 49000 |
| 4 | ▼ | (England) Jimmy White | 49000 |
| 5 | ▼ | (England) John Parrott | 48300 |
| 6 | Steady | (Scotland) Alan McManus | 46750 |
| 7 | ▲ | (Republic of Ireland) Ken Doherty | 42020 |
| 8 | ▲ | (Wales) Darren Morgan | 41500 |
| 9 | ▲ | (England) Ronnie O'Sullivan | 37620 |
| 10 | ▲ | (England) Peter Ebdon | 35240 |
| 11 | ▼ | (England) Nigel Bond | 34730 |
| 12 | ▲ | (Northern Ireland) Joe Swail | 32680 |
| 13 | ▲ | (England) David Roe | 32580 |
| 14 | ▼ | (Wales) Terry Griffiths | 31250 |
| 15 | ▼ | (England) Willie Thorne | 31250 |
| 16 | ▲ | (Malta) Tony Drago | 30250 |

== Points distribution ==
1994/1995 points distribution of world ranking events from the televised stages:

| Tournament | Round → | L64 | L32 | L16 | QF | SF | F | W |
|---|---|---|---|---|---|---|---|---|
| Dubai Classic | Unseeded loser | – | 1140 | 1330 | 1520 | 2025 | 2700 | 3600 |
| Dubai Classic | Seeded loser | – | 380 | – | – | – | – | – |
| Grand Prix | Unseeded loser | 640 | 855 | 1140 | NA | 1520 | 2025 | 2700 |
| Grand Prix | Seeded loser | 427 | – | – | – | – | – | – |
| UK Championship | Unseeded loser | 855 | 1140 | 1520 | 2025 | 2700 | 3600 | 4800 |
| UK Championship | Seeded loser | 570 | – | – | – | – | – | – |
| European Open | Unseeded loser | – | 1140 | 1330 | 1520 | 2025 | 2700 | 3600 |
| European Open | Seeded loser | – | 380 | – | – | – | – | – |
| Welsh Open | Unseeded loser | 640 | 855 | 1140 | 1520 | 2025 | 2700 | 3600 |
| Welsh Open | Seeded loser | 427 | – | – | – | – | – | – |
| International Open | Unseeded loser | 640 | 855 | 1140 | 1520 | 2025 | 2700 | 3600 |
| International Open | Seeded loser | 427 | – | – | – | – | – | – |
| Thailand Open | Unseeded loser | – | 1140 | 1330 | 1520 | 2025 | 2700 | 3600 |
| Thailand Open | Seeded loser | – | 380 | – | – | – | – | – |
| British Open | Unseeded loser | 640 | 855 | 1140 | 1520 | 2025 | 2700 | 3600 |
| British Open | Seeded loser | 427 | – | – | – | – | – | – |
