= Nigel Bond =

English snooker player

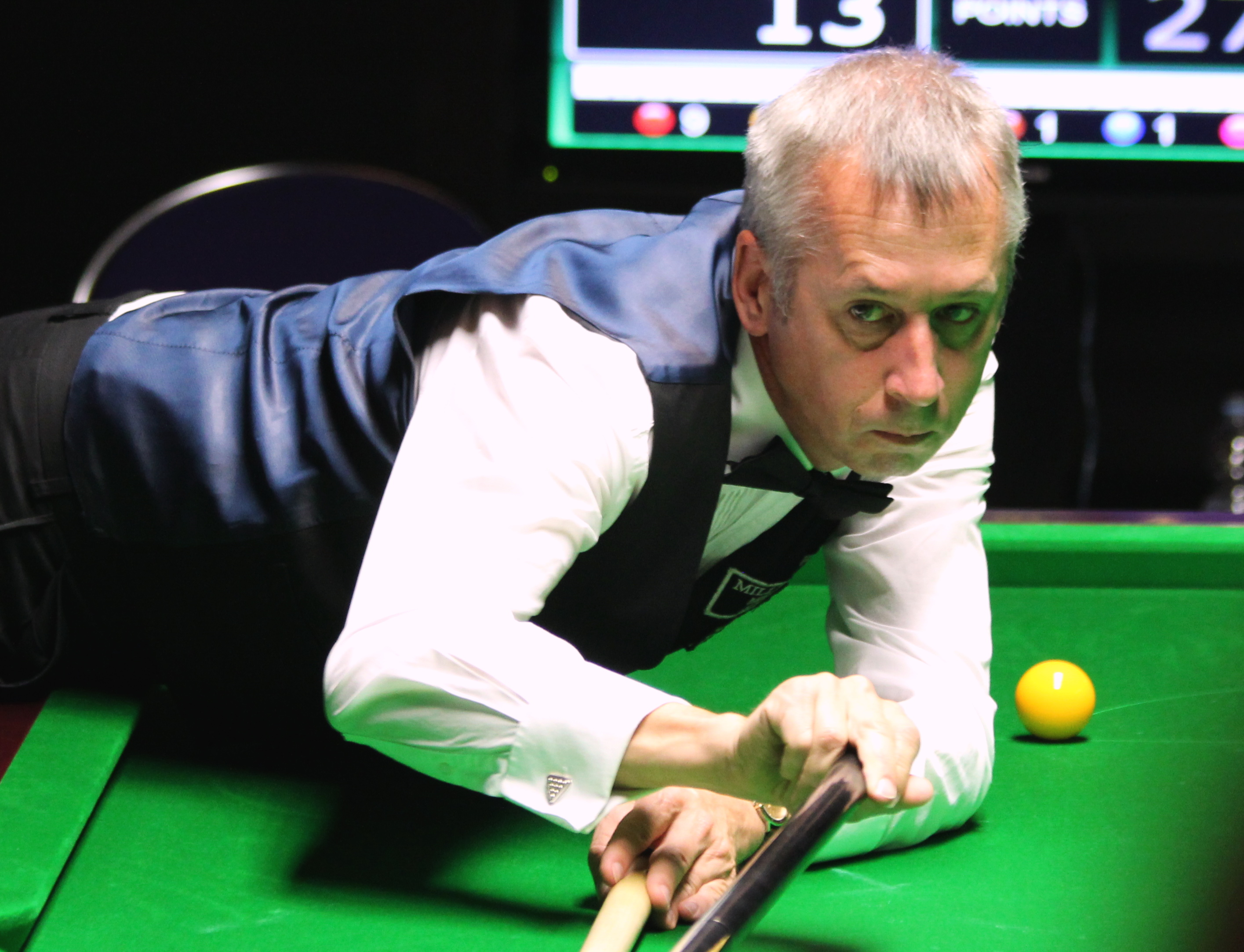
- Bond at the 2016 Paul Hunter Classic

Personal information
- Nickname: 00-147
- Born: 15 November 1965 (age 61) Darley Dale, Derbyshire, England

Sport
- Country: England
- Sport: Snooker
- Professional: 1989–2022
- Highest ranking: 5 (1996/1997)
- Century breaks: 128

Tournament wins
- Ranking: 1
Medal record
Men's snooker
Representing Great Britain
World Games
| Gold medal – first place | 2009 Kaohsiung | Individual |

Nigel Bond (born 15 November 1965) is an English former professional snooker player.

Bond competed on the main tour from 1989 to 2022, and was ranked within the world's top 16 players between 1992 and 1999, peaking at 5th for the 1996–97 season. He reached the final of the World Championship in 1995, where he lost 9–18 to Stephen Hendry. He won the 1996 British Open, defeating John Higgins 9–8.

Having reached three other ranking tournament finals, Bond won the 2011 Snooker Shoot-Out and, in 2012, defeated Tony Chappel to win the World Seniors Championship. He fell off the tour following his loss to Lukas Kleckers in the second qualifying round for the 2022 World Championship, and subsequently announced his retirement.

== Career ==
After a strong amateur career, Bond turned professional for the 1989–90 season. He reached his first ranking semi-final in his first season, and his first final in his second season, but his career peaked in the mid-1990s. In the first round of the 1994 World Championship, he pulled off one of the biggest comebacks in the event's history, rallying from 2–9 to defeat Cliff Thorburn 10–9 in what turned out to be Thorburn's last appearance at the Crucible. A year later, Bond reached the final after beating Stephen Lee, Alan McManus, Gary Wilkinson and Andy Hicks, but lost to Stephen Hendry 9–18. As a consequence of reaching the final, he climbed to number five in the world rankings for the 1996–97 season, and in that same season he acquired his only ranking tournament victory, the British Open, beating John Higgins 9–8 after needing a snooker in the final frame. He won the World Snooker Association Performance of the Year award for this achievement, although he then failed to maintain this level of performance.

He reached at least the quarter-finals at the Crucible Theatre every year from 1993 to 1996, losing to Hendry every time, which added extra spice to their first-round match in 2006. After leading comfortably throughout the early stages of the match, Bond was pegged back to 7–7 and the match went to a final frame. With only the black remaining, and seven points up, Bond clipped it into the left corner pocket, only for the cue ball to go in-off in the right middle pocket, resulting in a re-spotted black (the first one ever to decide the final frame of a World Championship match), which Bond potted to take frame and match. The final score was 10–9, Bond's first win at the Crucible since 1999, and his only last-16 run of that season.

By the end of the 1990s, he was out of the top 16, and dropped out of the top 32 for the 2004–05 season. However, he reclaimed his place a year later, and remained there until 2010. In the 2007 World Championship he lost in the first round, 7–10 to Peter Ebdon.

A run to the last 16 of the 2007 UK Championship, in which he came from 5–7 to win 9–7 against Ken Doherty in the last 32 before losing 6–9 to Ding Junhui in the last 16, was a precursor to Bond's first quarter-final run for five years, at the China Open. Victories over David Roe, Stephen Lee and Barry Pinches took him to a meeting with Stephen Maguire, who whitewashed him 5–0.

He opened the 2008–09 season with first-round defeats in the first five tournaments, but victory over Ebdon in the first round of the World Championship ensured that he held his top-32 status. This was, however, his last appearance at the main stages of the World Championship.

On 30 January 2011, Bond won the Snooker Shoot-Out event. This involved the top 64 players in the world playing 10-minute matches decided on a single frame. He picked up the £32,000 prize money as well as the Snooker Shoot-Out trophy, beating Robert Milkins 58–24 in the final.

He made a good start to the 2011–12 season by qualifying for the first two ranking event tournaments, the Australian Goldfields Open and the Shanghai Masters. He lost to Neil Robertson and Mark Selby respectively in the first round. He also qualified for the World Open, but was defeated by amateur player Lu Ning in the wildcard round. Bond finished the season ranked world number 45.

He once again qualified for the Australian Goldfields Open in the 2012–13 season, but lost to Robertson 1–5 in the last 32. In December, he reached the World Open in Haikou, China, with wins over Jimmy White and Jamie Burnett. At the venue he saw off Zhu Yinghui 5–3 in the wildcard round and received a bye through to the last 16 due to the withdrawal of Ali Carter. There he lost 1–5 to Judd Trump. Bond was also crowned World Seniors champion during the season without dropping a frame in a total of seven matches, concluding with a 2–0 victory against Tony Chappel in the final. His season ended when he was beaten 8–10 by McManus in the third round of World Championship Qualifying. He dropped a solitary place during the year to end it ranked world number 46.

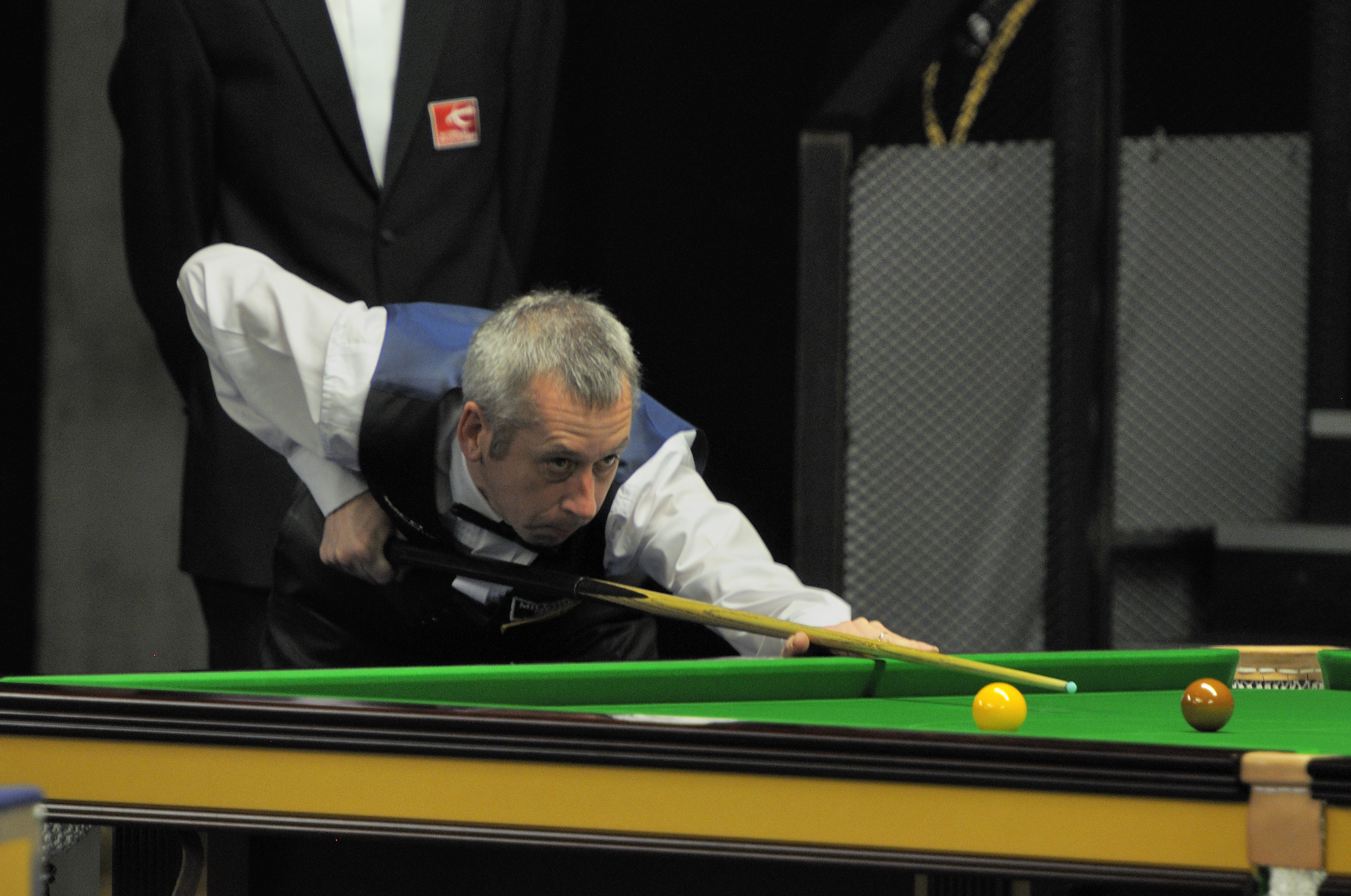
Bond at the 2013 German Masters

He reached the final of the World Seniors Championship for the second year in a row in the 2013–14 season, losing 1–2 to Steve Davis. He only won two matches at the main venue of ranking events all season, his best run coming in the China Open, where he beat Pinches 5–2 before losing to Selby 1–5 in the last 32. He fell 11 spots from the start of the season to end it as the world number 57.

He produced a comeback in the second round of the 2014 UK Championship, as from 0–5 down against world number five Barry Hawkins he took six successive frames to advance. However, in the third round Anthony McGill recovered from 1–4 down to eliminate him 6–5. The furthest Bond could progress in a ranking event this season was at the Indian Open, where he beat Ryan Day 4–1 and Dechawat Poomjaeng 4–3, before losing 1–4 to Chris Wakelin in the last 16. He fell just outside the top 64 at the end of the year as he was ranked 65th, but he earned a two-year extension via the European Order of Merit.

At the 2016 Indian Open, Bond defeated Ricky Walden 4–1, Sam Baird 4–2, John Astley 4–2 and Ebdon 4–3 to reach his first ranking event semi-final since 2002, where he lost 1–4 to Kyren Wilson. He had started practising at the Snooker Academy in Sheffield with young Chinese players and stated that this has contributed to him regaining the hunger and passion to play snooker. He would have a losing run of 10 successive matches shortly afterwards, but at the Gibraltar Open he beat five players to reach his second semi-final of the season, where he failed to pick up a frame in a defeat to Shaun Murphy. Bond kept his place on the tour through the one-year ranking list.

Bond made a surprise run to the quarter-finals of the 2019 UK Championship at the age of 54 winning a number of close matches. He defeated future world champion Luca Brecel 6–5 in his opening round followed by another 6–5 win over Louis Heathcote. His greatest victory en route to the quarter-finals was a 6–3 win against reigning world champion and world number 1 Judd Trump in the last 32 having trailed 3–1. Bond lost 6–5 to Mark Allen in the quarter-finals having led Allen 3–1.

== Performance and rankings timeline ==
| Tournament | 1989/ 90 | 1990/ 91 | 1991/ 92 | 1992/ 93 | 1993/ 94 | 1994/ 95 | 1995/ 96 | 1996/ 97 | 1997/ 98 | 1998/ 99 | 1999/ 00 | 2000/ 01 | 2001/ 02 | 2002/ 03 | 2003/ 04 | 2004/ 05 | 2005/ 06 | 2006/ 07 | 2007/ 08 | 2008/ 09 | 2009/ 10 | 2010/ 11 | 2011/ 12 | 2012/ 13 | 2013/ 14 | 2014/ 15 | 2015/ 16 | 2016/ 17 | 2017/ 18 | 2018/ 19 | 2019/ 20 | 2020/ 21 | 2021/ 22 |
|---|---|---|---|---|---|---|---|---|---|---|---|---|---|---|---|---|---|---|---|---|---|---|---|---|---|---|---|---|---|---|---|---|---|
| Ranking (Note: From the 2010/2011 season it shows the ranking at the beginning of the season.) | (Note: New players on the Main Tour do not have a ranking.) | 38 | 21 | 9 | 9 | 11 | 12 | 5 | 8 | 13 | 21 | 23 | 23 | 30 | 40 | 35 | 27 | 20 | 25 | 23 | 29 | 38 | 40 | 45 | 46 | 57 | (Note: Players qualified through European Tour Order of Merit started the season without prize money ranking points.) | 71 | (Note: Players qualified One Year Ranking List started the season without ranking points.) | 80 | | 68 | 64 |
Ranking tournaments
| Championship League | Tournament Not Held | | | | | | | | | | | | | | | | | | Non-Ranking Event | | | | | | | | | | | | | RR | RR |
| British Open | LQ | LQ | 2R | 2R | QF | 2R | W | 3R | 1R | 1R | 1R | 1R | 1R | 1R | 1R | 1R | Tournament Not Held | | | | | | | | | | | | | | | | 1R |
| Northern Ireland Open | Tournament Not Held | | | | | | | | | | | | | | | | | | | | | | | | | | | 1R | 1R | 2R | 1R | 2R | LQ |
| English Open | Tournament Not Held | | | | | | | | | | | | | | | | | | | | | | | | | | | 1R | 1R | 2R | 1R | 2R | 1R |
| UK Championship | 1R | QF | 2R | 2R | QF | 1R | QF | 3R | 1R | 2R | 2R | 2R | 1R | 1R | QF | 1R | 2R | 1R | 2R | LQ | LQ | LQ | LQ | LQ | 2R | 3R | 1R | 1R | 1R | 1R | QF | 1R | 1R |
| Scottish Open (Note: The event ran under different names such as International Open (1989/1990 to 1996/1997) and Players Championship (2003/2004).) | SF | Not Held | | QF | 2R | 3R | 2R | 3R | 3R | 2R | 1R | 2R | SF | 1R | 1R | Tournament Not Held | | | | | | | | MR | Not Held | | | 1R | 1R | 3R | 1R | 2R | LQ |
| World Grand Prix | Tournament Not Held | | | | | | | | | | | | | | | | | | | | | | | | | NR | DNQ | DNQ | DNQ | DNQ | DNQ | DNQ | DNQ |
| Shoot-Out | NH | NR | Tournament Not Held | | | | | | | | | | | | | | | | | | | Non-Ranking Event | | | | | | 2R | 4R | 1R | 2R | 2R | 3R |
| German Masters (Note: The event was called the German Open (1995/1996–1997/1998)) | Tournament Not Held | | | | | | 2R | SF | 1R | NR | Tournament Not Held | | | | | | | | | | | 1R | LQ | LQ | LQ | LQ | LQ | LQ | LQ | LQ | 2R | LQ | LQ |
| Players Championship (Note: The event run under different name as Players Tour Championship Grand Finals (2010/2011–2012/2013) and Players Championship Grand Final (2013/2014–2015/2016)) | Tournament Not Held | | | | | | | | | | | | | | | | | | | | | DNQ | DNQ | DNQ | DNQ | DNQ | DNQ | DNQ | DNQ | DNQ | DNQ | DNQ | DNQ |
| European Masters (Note: The event ran under different names such as European Open (1989/1990-1996/1997, 2001/2002-2003/2004) and Malta Cup (2004/2005–2007/2008)) | QF | 1R | 1R | 2R | 1R | SF | 1R | 2R | NH | 1R | Not Held | | 2R | LQ | LQ | LQ | 2R | 2R | NR | Tournament Not Held | | | | | | | | LQ | LQ | LQ | LQ | 2R | LQ |
| Welsh Open | Not Held | | SF | QF | 3R | 1R | 1R | 3R | 3R | 2R | 1R | 1R | LQ | LQ | LQ | LQ | 1R | 3R | 1R | LQ | LQ | 1R | LQ | LQ | 1R | 1R | 1R | 1R | 4R | 2R | 1R | 2R | LQ |
| Turkish Masters | Tournament Not Held | | | | | | | | | | | | | | | | | | | | | | | | | | | | | | | | LQ |
| Gibraltar Open | Tournament Not Held | | | | | | | | | | | | | | | | | | | | | | | | | | MR | SF | 1R | 2R | 1R | 1R | 3R |
| Tour Championship | Tournament Not Held | | | | | | | | | | | | | | | | | | | | | | | | | | | | | DNQ | DNQ | DNQ | DNQ |
| World Championship | LQ | LQ | 1R | QF | QF | F | SF | 1R | 1R | 2R | 1R | 1R | LQ | 1R | LQ | LQ | 2R | 1R | 1R | 2R | LQ | LQ | LQ | LQ | LQ | LQ | LQ | LQ | LQ | LQ | LQ | LQ | LQ |
Non-ranking tournaments
| The Masters | A | LQ | LQ | 1R | 1R | 1R | 1R | SF | QF | 1R | LQ | LQ | LQ | LQ | LQ | A | LQ | LQ | LQ | LQ | A | A | A | A | A | A | A | A | A | A | A | A | A |
| Championship League | Tournament Not Held | | | | | | | | | | | | | | | | | | RR | A | A | A | A | A | A | A | A | A | A | A | A | A | A |
| World Seniors Championship | Not Held | | A | Tournament Not Held | | | | | | | | | | | | | | | | | | SF | 1R | W | F | 1R | QF | A | A | NH | A | 1R | QF |
Former ranking tournaments
| Classic | LQ | LQ | SF | Tournament Not Held | | | | | | | | | | | | | | | | | | | | | | | | | | | | | |
| Strachan Open | Not Held | | SF | MR | NR | Tournament Not Held | | | | | | | | | | | | | | | | | | | | | | | | | | | |
| Dubai Classic (Note: The event run under different names as Dubai Masters (1988/1989), Thailand Classic (1995/1996) and Asian Classic (1996/1997)) | 3R | 1R | 3R | 1R | 1R | QF | F | 2R | Tournament Not Held | | | | | | | | | | | | | | | | | | | | | | | | |
| Malta Grand Prix | Tournament Not Held | | | | | Non-Ranking Event | | | | | 2R | NR | Tournament Not Held | | | | | | | | | | | | | | | | | | | | |
| Thailand Masters (Note: The event ran under different names such as Asian Open (1989/1990 to 1992/1993) and Thailand Open (1993/1994 to 1996/1997).) | LQ | 3R | 1R | 1R | 1R | 2R | 1R | F | QF | 2R | 2R | 1R | LQ | NR | Not Held | | | NR | Tournament Not Held | | | | | | | | | | | | | | |
| Irish Masters | Non-Ranking Event | | | | | | | | | | | | | LQ | 2R | 1R | NH | NR | Tournament Not Held | | | | | | | | | | | | | | |
| Northern Ireland Trophy | Tournament Not Held | | | | | | | | | | | | | | | | NR | 2R | 2R | 1R | Tournament Not Held | | | | | | | | | | | | |
| Bahrain Championship | Tournament Not Held | | | | | | | | | | | | | | | | | | | LQ | Tournament Not Held | | | | | | | | | | | | |
| Wuxi Classic (Note: The event was called the Jiangsu Classic (2008/2009–2009/2010)) | Tournament Not Held | | | | | | | | | | | | | | | | | | | Non-Ranking Event | | | | LQ | 1R | LQ | Tournament Not Held | | | | | | |
| Australian Goldfields Open (Note: The event ran under different names such as Hong Kong Open (1989/1990), Australian Open (1994/1995) and Australian Masters (1995/1996)) | 1R | Tournament Not Held | | | | Non-Rank | | Tournament Not Held | | | | | | | | | | | | | | | 1R | 1R | LQ | LQ | LQ | Tournament Not Held | | | | | |
| Shanghai Masters | Tournament Not Held | | | | | | | | | | | | | | | | | | 1R | LQ | 1R | LQ | 1R | LQ | LQ | LQ | LQ | LQ | LQ | Non-Rank | | Not Held | |
| Paul Hunter Classic (Note: The event was called the Grand Prix Fürth (2004/2005) and the Fürth German Open (2005/2006–2006/2007)) | Tournament Not Held | | | | | | | | | | | | | | | Pro-am Event | | | | | | Minor-Ranking Event | | | | | | 1R | 2R | 1R | NR | Not Held | |
| Indian Open | Tournament Not Held | | | | | | | | | | | | | | | | | | | | | | | | 1R | 3R | NH | SF | LQ | LQ | Not Held | | |
| China Open (Note: The event run under different name as China International (1997/1998–1998/1999)) | Tournament Not Held | | | | | | | | NR | 2R | LQ | 2R | LQ | Not Held | | WR | LQ | LQ | QF | 1R | 2R | 1R | LQ | LQ | 1R | LQ | LQ | LQ | 1R | 1R | Not Held | | |
| Riga Masters (Note: The event was called the Riga Open (2014/2015–2015/2016)) | Tournament Not Held | | | | | | | | | | | | | | | | | | | | | | | | | MR | | LQ | 2R | 1R | A | Not Held | |
| International Championship | Tournament Not Held | | | | | | | | | | | | | | | | | | | | | | | LQ | LQ | 1R | LQ | LQ | LQ | LQ | 1R | Not Held | |
| China Championship | Tournament Not Held | | | | | | | | | | | | | | | | | | | | | | | | | | | NR | LQ | 1R | LQ | Not Held | |
| World Open (Note: The event run under different names as Professional Players Tournament (1982/1983-1983/1984), Grand Prix (1984/1985–2000/2001 and 2004/2005–2009/2010), LG Cup (2001/2002–2003/2004), the World Open (2010/2011) and the Haikou World Open (2011/2012–2013/2014)) | 2R | F | SF | QF | 2R | 1R | 2R | 1R | 2R | 2R | 2R | 1R | 1R | 3R | LQ | 3R | 2R | RR | RR | LQ | 1R | 1R | WR | 2R | 1R | Not Held | | LQ | LQ | LQ | 1R | Not Held | |
| WST Pro Series | Tournament Not Held | | | | | | | | | | | | | | | | | | | | | | | | | | | | | | | RR | NH |
Former non-ranking tournaments
| European Grand Masters | NH | QF | Tournament Not Held | | | | | | | | | | | | | | | | | | | | | | | | | | | | | | |
| World Masters | NH | 2R | Tournament Not Held | | | | | | | | | | | | | | | | | | | | | | | | | | | | | | |
| World Matchplay | A | A | A | 1R | Tournament Not Held | | | | | | | | | | | | | | | | | | | | | | | | | | | | |
| King's Cup | NH | A | NH | W | A | A | Tournament Not Held | | | | | | | | | | | | | | | | | | | | | | | | | | |
| Red & White Challenge | Tournament Not Held | | | | | | W | Tournament Not Held | | | | | | | | | | | | | | | | | | | | | | | | | |
| Pontins Professional | A | A | A | A | F | A | F | A | A | A | A | Tournament Not Held | | | | | | | | | | | | | | | | | | | | | |
| Malta Grand Prix | Tournament Not Held | | | | | A | 1R | W | QF | A | R | A | Tournament Not Held | | | | | | | | | | | | | | | | | | | | |
| Charity Challenge | Tournament Not Held | | | | | 1R | 1R | QF | 1R | A | A | A | A | Tournament Not Held | | | | | | | | | | | | | | | | | | | |
| Scottish Masters | A | A | A | A | SF | A | QF | 1R | W | SF | A | A | LQ | LQ | Tournament Not Held | | | | | | | | | | | | | | | | | | |
| Irish Masters | A | QF | A | QF | A | A | A | 1R | 1R | A | A | A | A | Ranking | | | NH | A | Tournament Not Held | | | | | | | | | | | | | | |
| Pot Black | A | A | A | 1R | 1R | Tournament Not Held | | | | | | | | | | | A | A | A | Tournament Not Held | | | | | | | | | | | | | |
| Legends of Snooker | Tournament Not Held | | | | | | | | | | | | | | | | | | | | SF | Tournament Not Held | | | | | | | | | | | |
| Shoot-Out | NH | 3R | Tournament Not Held | | | | | | | | | | | | | | | | | | | W | 1R | 3R | 2R | 1R | A | Ranking Event | | | | | |

Performance Table Legend
| LQ | lost in the qualifying draw | #R | lost in the early rounds of the tournament (WR = Wildcard round, RR = Round robin) | QF | lost in the quarter-finals |
| SF | lost in the semi-finals | F | lost in the final | W | won the tournament |
| DNQ | did not qualify for the tournament | A | did not participate in the tournament | WD | withdrew from the tournament |

| NH / Not Held | means an event was not held. |
| NR / Non-Ranking Event | means an event is/was no longer a ranking event. |
| R / Ranking Event | means an event is/was a ranking event. |
| MR / Minor-Ranking Event | means an event is/was a minor-ranking event. |
| PA / Pro-am Event | means an event is/was a pro-am event. |

== Career finals ==
=== Ranking finals: 5 (1 title) ===
Legend
World Championship (0–1)
Other (1–3)

| Outcome | No. | Year | Championship | Opponent in the final | Score |
|---|---|---|---|---|---|
| Runner-up | 1. | 1990 | Grand Prix | (Scotland) Stephen Hendry | 5–10 |
| Runner-up | 2. | 1995 | World Snooker Championship | (Scotland) Stephen Hendry | 9–18 |
| Runner-up | 3. | 1995 | Thailand Classic | (England) John Parrott | 6–9 |
| Winner | 1. | 1996 | British Open | (Scotland) John Higgins | 9–8 |
| Runner-up | 4. | 1997 | Thailand Open | (England) Peter Ebdon | 7–9 |

=== Minor-ranking finals: 1 ===
| Outcome | No. | Year | Championship | Opponent in the final | Score |
|---|---|---|---|---|---|
| Runner-up | 1. | 1993 | Strachan Challenge – Event 2 | (England) Troy Shaw | 4–9 |

=== Non-ranking finals: 8 (6 titles) ===
| Outcome | No. | Year | Championship | Opponent in the final | Score |
|---|---|---|---|---|---|
| Winner | 1. | 1992 | King's Cup | (Thailand) James Wattana | 8–7 |
| Runner-up | 1. | 1994 | Pontins Professional | (Republic of Ireland) Ken Doherty | 5–9 |
| Winner | 2. | 1995 | Red & White Challenge | (England) John Parrott | 8–6 |
| Runner-up | 2. | 1996 | Pontins Professional (2) | (Republic of Ireland) Ken Doherty | 7–9 |
| Winner | 3. | 1996 | Malta Grand Prix | (Malta) Tony Drago | 7–3 |
| Winner | 4. | 1997 | Scottish Masters | (Scotland) Alan McManus | 9–8 |
| Winner | 5. | 2009 | World Games | (England) David Grace | 3–0 |
| Winner | 6. | 2011 | Snooker Shoot Out | (England) Robert Milkins | 1–0 |

=== Pro-am finals: 4 (1 title) ===
| Outcome | No. | Year | Championship | Opponent in the final | Score |
|---|---|---|---|---|---|
| Runner-up | 1. | 2008 | Pontins Spring Open | (England) David Grace | 1–5 |
| Winner | 1. | 2010 | Pontins Spring Open | (England) Stephen Craigie | 5–2 |
| Runner-up | 2. | 2014 | Vienna Snooker Open | (England) Mark King | 2–5 |
| Runner-up | 3. | 2017 | Vienna Snooker Open (2) | (England) David Grace | 2–5 |

=== Amateur finals: 1 (1 title) ===
| Outcome | No. | Year | Championship | Opponent in the final | Score |
|---|---|---|---|---|---|
| Winner | 1. | 1989 | English Amateur Championship | (England) Barry Pinches | 13–11 |

=== Seniors finals: 2 (1 title) ===
| Outcome | No. | Year | Championship | Opponent in the final | Score |
|---|---|---|---|---|---|
| Winner | 1. | 2012 | World Seniors Championship | (Wales) Tony Chappel | 2–0 |
| Runner-up | 1. | 2013 | World Seniors Championship | (England) Steve Davis | 1–2 |
