= 1994 Pontins Professional =

Tournament information
- Dates: 7–14 May 1994
- Venue: Pontin's
- City: Prestatyn
- Country: Wales
- Organisation: WPBSA
- Format: Non-Ranking event
- Total prize fund: £12,000
- Winner's share: £3,500
- Highest break: Neal Foulds (ENG) (129)

Final
- Champion: Ken Doherty (IRE)
- Runner-up: Nigel Bond (ENG)
- Score: 9–5

The 1994 Pontins Professional was the twenty-first edition of the professional invitational snooker tournament which took place between 7 and 14 May 1994 at Pontin's in Prestatyn, Wales.

The tournament featured eight professional players. The quarter-final matches were contested over the best of 9 frames, the semi-finals best of eleven and the final best of seventeen.

Ken Doherty won the event, defeating Nigel Bond 9–5 in the final, and received £3,500 from the total prize fund of £12,000 as champion. Neal Foulds compiled the highest break of the competition, 129.

== Main draw ==
Results for the tournament are shown below.

Quarter-finals; Best of 9 frames
(Republic of Ireland) Ken Doherty	5
(England) Les Dodd	2
(England) Gary Wilkinson	5
(England) Neal Foulds	2
(England) Nigel Bond	5
(England) Mike Hallett	3
(England) Tony Knowles	5
(Scotland) Stephen Hendry	2

Semi-finals; Best of 11 frames
(Republic of Ireland) Ken Doherty	6
(England) Gary Wilkinson	5
(England) Nigel Bond	6
(England) Tony Knowles	1

Final; Best of 17 frames
(Republic of Ireland) Ken Doherty	9
(England) Nigel Bond	5

== Final ==
Details of the final are shown below:

Final: Best of 17 frames. Referee: unknown. Pontins, Prestatyn, Wales, 11 May 1998.
Ken Doherty (Republic of Ireland)	9–5	Nigel Bond (England)
83–42, 52–64, 69(54)–38, 68–32, 59–61, 55–23, 6–81(76), 8–82(68), 79–15, 70–7, 70–33, 55–45, 0–102(102), 67(57)–13
57	Highest break	102
0	Century breaks	1
2	50+ breaks	3

== Century breaks ==
Two century breaks were made during the tournament:

- 129 Neal Foulds (ENG)
- 102 Nigel Bond (ENG)
