= 1993 Irish Masters =

Irish Masters
Tournament information
- Dates: 23–28 March 1993
- Venue: Goffs
- City: Kill
- Country: Ireland
- Organisation: WPBSA
- Format: Non-Ranking event
- Total prize fund: £180,000
- Winner's share: £45,000
- Highest break: Ken Doherty (IRL) (136)

Final
- Champion: (England) Steve Davis
- Runner-up: (Scotland) Alan McManus
- Score: 9–4

The 1993 Irish Masters was the nineteenth edition of the professional invitational snooker tournament, which took place from 23 to 28 March 1993. The tournament was played at Goffs in Kill, County Kildare, and featured twelve professional players.

Steve Davis won the title for the seventh time, beating Alan McManus 9–4 in the final.

== Main draw ==
Round 1 Best of 9 frames
(Republic of Ireland) Ken Doherty	5
(England) Neal Foulds	2
(England) Nigel Bond	5
(England) Gary Wilkinson	3
(Scotland) Alan McManus	5
(Wales) Terry Griffiths	4
(Thailand) James Wattana	5
(Northern Ireland) Dennis Taylor	0

Quarter-finals; Best of 9 frames
(England) Steve Davis	5
(Republic of Ireland) Ken Doherty	3
(Scotland) Stephen Hendry	5
(England) Nigel Bond	2
(Scotland) Alan McManus	5
(England) Jimmy White	2
(England) John Parrott	5
(Thailand) James Wattana	3

Semi-finals; Best of 11 frames
(England) Steve Davis	6
(Scotland) Stephen Hendry	3
(Scotland) Alan McManus	6
(England) John Parrott	5

Final; Best of 17 frames
(England) Steve Davis	9
(Scotland) Alan McManus	4
