= 1994 Irish Masters =

Irish Masters
Tournament information
- Dates: 22–27 March 1994
- Venue: Goffs
- City: Kill
- Country: Ireland
- Organisation: WPBSA
- Format: Non-Ranking event
- Total prize fund: £190,000
- Winner's share: £48,000
- Highest break: 141 (Fergal O'Brien and Stephen Hendry)

Final
- Champion: (England) Steve Davis
- Runner-up: (Scotland) Alan McManus
- Score: 9–8

The 1994 Irish Masters was the twentieth edition of the professional invitational snooker tournament, which took place from 22 to 27 March 1994. The tournament was played at Goffs in Kill, County Kildare, and featured twelve professional players.

Steve Davis won the title for the eighth time, beating Alan McManus 9–8 in the final.

== Qualifying ==
Four qualifying matches were played, under a best-of-nine frames format, the winners going on to play Jimmy White, John Parrott, Steve Davis and Stephen Hendry, all of whom were seeded to the quarter-final stage.

=== Round 1 ===
- (England) Ronnie O'Sullivan 5–1 (Wales) Terry Griffiths
- (Republic of Ireland) Fergal O'Brien 5–1 (England) Willie Thorne
- (Thailand) James Wattana 5–1 (England) Peter Ebdon
- (Scotland) Alan McManus 5–2 (Republic of Ireland) Ken Doherty

== Main draw ==
Quarter-finals; Best of 9 frames		Semi-finals; Best of 11 frames		Final; Best of 17 frames
(Scotland) Alan McManus	5
(England) John Parrott	2	(Scotland) Alan McManus	6
(Republic of Ireland) Fergal O'Brien	5	(Republic of Ireland) Fergal O'Brien	4
(Scotland) Stephen Hendry	2			(Scotland) Alan McManus	8
(England) Steve Davis	5			(England) Steve Davis	9
(England) Ronnie O'Sullivan	2	(England) Steve Davis	6
(England) Jimmy White	5	(England) Jimmy White	5
(Thailand) James Wattana	2

== Final ==
Final: Best of 17 frames. Referee: unknown. Goffs, Kildare, Ireland, 27 March 1994.
Steve Davis; England	9–8	Alan McManus; Scotland
89–1 (54), 72–30 (65), 80–0, 108–0 (105), 9–84, 12–122 (118), 69–50 (69), 102–9 (101), 37–99 (77), 62–72 (Davis 54), 75–9 (52), 19–64, 13–111 (72), 0–118 (87), 9–79 (69), 89–40, 77–39 (69)
105	Highest break	118
2	Century breaks	1
8	50+ breaks	5

== Century breaks ==
- 141, 102 – Fergal O'Brien
- 141 – Stephen Hendry
- 120, 105, 101 – Steve Davis
- 118 – John Parrott
- 118, 106 – Alan McManus
