= 1996 Pontins Professional =

Tournament information
- Dates: May 1996
- Venue: Pontin's
- City: Prestatyn
- Country: Wales
- Organisation: WPBSA
- Format: Non-Ranking event

Final
- Champion: (Republic of Ireland) Ken Doherty
- Runner-up: (England) Nigel Bond
- Score: 9–7

The 1996 Pontins Professional was the twenty-third edition of the professional invitational snooker tournament which took place in May 1996 in Prestatyn, Wales.

The tournament featured eight professional players. The quarter-final matches were contested over the best of 9 frames, the semi-final matches over the best of 11 frames, and the final over the best of 17 frames.

Ken Doherty won the event for the third time, beating Nigel Bond 9–7 in the final.

== Main draw ==
Quarter-finals; Best of 9 frames
(Republic of Ireland) Ken Doherty	5
(Wales) Mark Williams	4
(England) Peter Ebdon	5
(England) Mike Hallett	3
(England) Nigel Bond	5
(England) Andy Hicks	2
(Wales) Darren Morgan	5
(England) Neal Foulds	0

Semi-finals; Best of 11 frames
(Republic of Ireland) Ken Doherty	6
(England) Peter Ebdon	3
(England) Nigel Bond	6
(Wales) Darren Morgan	5

Final; Best of 17 frames
(Republic of Ireland) Ken Doherty	9
(England) Nigel Bond	7
