= 1992 Irish Masters =

Irish Masters
Tournament information
- Dates: 31 March – 5 April 1992
- Venue: Goffs
- City: Kill
- Country: Ireland
- Organisation: WPBSA
- Format: Non-Ranking event
- Total prize fund: £170,000
- Winner's share: £42,500
- Highest break: Steve James (ENG) (104)

Final
- Champion: (Scotland) Stephen Hendry
- Runner-up: (Republic of Ireland) Ken Doherty
- Score: 9–6

The 1992 Irish Masters was the eighteenth edition of the professional invitational snooker tournament. It took place from 31 March to 5 April 1992 at Goffs in Kill, County Kildare, and featured twelve professional players.

Stephen Hendry won the title for the first time, beating Ken Doherty 9–6 in the final.

== Main draw ==
Round 1 Best of 9 frames
(England) Steve James | 5
(Wales) Terry Griffiths | 2
(Northern Ireland) Dennis Taylor | 5
(England) Gary Wilkinson | 4
(Republic of Ireland) Ken Doherty | 5
(Northern Ireland) Alex Higgins | 3
(England) Mike Hallett | 5
(England) Neal Foulds | 4

Quarter-finals; Best of 9 frames
(Scotland) Stephen Hendry | 5
(England) Steve James | 3
(England) John Parrott | 5
(Northern Ireland) Dennis Taylor | 1
(Republic of Ireland) Ken Doherty | 5
(England) Steve Davis | 4
(England) Mike Hallett | 5
(England) Jimmy White | 1

Semi-finals; Best of 11 frames
(Scotland) Stephen Hendry | 6
(England) John Parrott | 4
(Republic of Ireland) Ken Doherty | 6
(England) Mike Hallett | 1

Final; Best of 17 frames
(Scotland) Stephen Hendry | 9
(Republic of Ireland) Ken Doherty | 6

== Century breaks ==
- 104 – Steve James
- 102 – Dennis Taylor
