= 1991 World Matchplay (snooker) =

World Matchplay
Tournament information
- Dates: 5–14 December 1991
- Venue: The Dome Leisure Centre
- City: Doncaster
- Country: England
- Format: Non-ranking event
- Winner's share: £70,000

Final
- Champion: (England) Gary Wilkinson
- Runner-up: (England) Steve Davis
- Score: 18–11

The 1991 Coalite World Matchplay was a professional non-ranking snooker tournament that took place in December 1991 in Doncaster, England.

Gary Wilkinson won the event, defeating Steve Davis 18–11 in the final to win his first and only major title of his career.

== Main draw ==
Round 1 Best of 9 frames
(Northern Ireland) Dennis Taylor	5
(England) Steve James	2
(England) Gary Wilkinson	5
(England) Dean Reynolds	1
(England) Mike Hallett	5
(England) Tony Jones	2
(Wales) Terry Griffiths	5
(England) Neal Foulds	4

Quarter-finals; Best of 17 frames
(England) Jimmy White	9
(Northern Ireland) Dennis Taylor	6
(England) John Parrott	8
(England) Gary Wilkinson	9
(Scotland) Stephen Hendry	9
(England) Mike Hallett	2
(England) Steve Davis	9
(Wales) Terry Griffiths	5

Semi-finals; Best of 17 frames
(England) Jimmy White	6
(England) Gary Wilkinson	9
(Scotland) Stephen Hendry	2
(England) Steve Davis	9

Final; Best of 35 frames
(England) Gary Wilkinson	18
(England) Steve Davis	11
