= 2000 Pontins Professional =

Tournament information
- Dates: 13–20 May 2000
- Venue: Pontin's
- City: Prestatyn
- Country: Wales
- Organisation: WPBSA
- Format: Non-Ranking event
- Highest break: (England) Jimmy White (122)

Final
- Champion: (Wales) Darren Morgan
- Runner-up: (England) Jimmy White
- Score: 9–2

The 2000 Pontins Professional was a professional invitational snooker tournament which took place in May 2000 in Prestatyn, Wales.

The tournament featured eight professional players. The quarter-final matches were contested over the best of 9 frames, the semi-finals best of eleven and the final best of seventeen.

The 2000 tournament was the twenty-seventh and final edition of the Pontins Professional, the series being discontinued thereafter.

Darren Morgan won the event, by defeating Jimmy White 9–2 in the final.

== Main draw ==
Results from the tournament are shown below.

Quarter-finals; Best of 9 frames
(England) Jimmy White	5
(England) Martin Clark	3
(Wales) Matthew Stevens	5
(Republic of Ireland) Ken Doherty	3
(Wales) Darren Morgan	5
(Wales) Mark Williams	3
(England) Paul Hunter	5
(England) Stephen Lee	3

Semi-finals; Best of 11 frames
(England) Jimmy White	6
(Wales) Matthew Stevens	3
(Wales) Darren Morgan	6
(England) Paul Hunter	4

Final; Best of 17 frames
(England) Jimmy White	2
(Wales) Darren Morgan	9

== Final ==
Final: Best of 17 frames. Pontins, Prestatyn, Wales, 20 May 2000.
Jimmy White; England	2–9	Darren Morgan; Wales
44–72, 49–77 (61), 33–70, 0–119 (119), 70–14, 0–76 (65), 7–104 (77), 43–86, 102–16 (101), 0–111 (80), 0–76 (75)
101	Highest break	119
1	Century breaks	1
1	50+ breaks	6

== Century breaks ==
Century breaks from the tournament are shown below.

- 122, 101, 101 – Jimmy White
- 119 – Darren Morgan
- 116 – Matthew Stevens
- 106 – Paul Hunter
