= 1991 Irish Masters =

Irish Masters
Tournament information
- Dates: 2–7 April 1991
- Venue: Goffs
- City: Kill
- Country: Ireland
- Organisation: WPBSA
- Format: Non-Ranking event
- Total prize fund: £160,000
- Winner's share: £40,000
- Highest break: John Parrott (ENG) (97)

Final
- Champion: (England) Steve Davis
- Runner-up: (Northern Ireland) John Parrott
- Score: 9–5

The 1991 Irish Masters was the seventeenth edition of the professional invitational snooker tournament, which took place from 2 to 7 April 1991. The tournament was played at Goffs in Kill, County Kildare, and featured twelve professional players.

Steve Davis won the title for the sixth time, beating John Parrott 9–5 in the final.

== Main draw ==
Round 1 Best of 9 frames
(England) Steve James	5
(England) Dean Reynolds	2
(Republic of Ireland) Ken Doherty	5
(Wales) Doug Mountjoy	4
(England) Nigel Bond	5
(Wales) Terry Griffiths	0
(Northern Ireland) Dennis Taylor	5
(England) Mike Hallett	2

Quarter-finals; Best of 9 frames
(England) Steve Davis	5
(England) Steve James	3
(England) Jimmy White	5
(Republic of Ireland) Ken Doherty	3
(England) John Parrott	5
(England) Nigel Bond	3
(Northern Ireland) Dennis Taylor	5
(Scotland) Stephen Hendry	2

Semi-finals; Best of 11 frames
(England) Steve Davis	6
(England) Jimmy White	5
(England) John Parrott	6
(Northern Ireland) Dennis Taylor	2

Final; Best of 17 frames
(England) Steve Davis	9
(England) John Parrott	5
