= 2009 Legends of Snooker =

Legends of Snooker
Tournament information
- Dates: 31 October – 1 November 2009
- Venue: Rothes Hall
- City: Glenrothes
- Country: Scotland
- Organisation: 110 Sports Management Group
- Format: Non-Ranking event

Final
- Champion: (Scotland) Stephen Hendry
- Runner-up: (Republic of Ireland) Ken Doherty
- Score: 5–3

The 2009 110sport.tv Legends of Snooker was a snooker legends tournament that took place between 31 October–1 November 2009 at Rothes Hall in Glenrothes, Scotland. The tournament was won by Stephen Hendry, who defeated Ken Doherty 5–3 in the final.

John Parrott had been expected to play, but withdrew and was replaced by Nigel Bond.

== Main draw ==
Results of the tournament are shown below:

Quarter-finals; Best of 7 frames
(Republic of Ireland) Ken Doherty	4
(England) Tony Knowles	1
(England) Nigel Bond	4
(England) Jimmy White	1
(Scotland) Stephen Hendry	4
(Malta) Tony Drago	2
(Canada) Cliff Thorburn	4
(Northern Ireland) Alex Higgins	0

Semi-finals; Best of 9 frames
(Republic of Ireland) Ken Doherty	5
(England) Nigel Bond	0
(Scotland) Stephen Hendry	5
(Canada) Cliff Thorburn	0

Final; Best of 9 frames
(Republic of Ireland) Ken Doherty	3
(Scotland) Stephen Hendry	5
