= 1995 Red & White Challenge =

1995 Red and White Challenge
Tournament information
- Dates: 6–7 September 1995
- Venue: Liaquat Gymnasium
- City: Islamabad
- Country: Pakistan
- Format: Non-ranking event
- Total prize fund: £15,000
- Winner's share: £6,000
- Highest break: John Parrott (ENG), 128

Final
- Champion: Nigel Bond (ENG)
- Runner-up: John Parrott (ENG)
- Score: 8–6

The 1995 Red and White Challenge was a non-ranking invitational snooker tournament which took place from 6 to 7 September 1995 at the Liaquat Gymnasium in Islamabad, Pakistan. The tournament featured four professional players - Nigel Bond, John Parrott, Ken Doherty and David Roe - alongside four amateurs from Pakistan: Mohammed Yousuf, Naveen Perwani, Saleh Mohammadi, and Farhan Mirza.

Bond won the tournament, beating Parrott 8–6 in the final. All of the amateur players, including the reigning world amateur champion Yousuf, lost their opening matches.

Bond received £6,000 from the total prize fund of £15,000 as champion, and Parrott received £3,000 as runner-up. Parrott made the highest break of the tournament, 128, against Mirza.

== Main draw ==
Results of the tournament are shown below.

Quarter-finals; Best of 9 frames
John Parrott (ENG) | 5
Farhan Mirza (PAK) | 0
David Roe (ENG) | 5
Saleh Mohammadi (PAK) | 1
Ken Doherty (IRL) | 5
Naveen Perwani (PAK) | 0
Nigel Bond (ENG) | 5
Mohammed Yousuf (PAK) | 0

Semi-finals; Best of 11 frames
John Parrott (ENG) | 6
David Roe (ENG) | 1
Ken Doherty (IRL) | 0
Nigel Bond (ENG) | 6

Final; Best of 15 frames
John Parrott (ENG) | 6
Nigel Bond (ENG) | 8
