= 1996 Irish Masters =

Irish Masters
Tournament information
- Dates: 26–31 March 1996
- Venue: Goffs
- City: Kill
- Country: Ireland
- Organisation: WPBSA
- Format: Non-Ranking event

Final
- Champion: (Wales) Darren Morgan
- Runner-up: (England) Steve Davis
- Score: 9–8

The 1996 Irish Masters was the twenty-second edition of the professional invitational snooker tournament, which took place from 26 to 31 March 1996. The tournament was played at Goffs in Kill, County Kildare, and featured twelve professional players.

Darren Morgan won the title for the first time, beating Steve Davis 9–8 in the final.

== Main draw ==
Round 1 Best of 11 frames
(Wales) Darren Morgan	6
(Scotland) Alan McManus	4
(Northern Ireland) Joe Swail	6
(England) John Parrott	4
(Thailand) James Wattana	6
(Scotland) John Higgins	4
(Republic of Ireland) Ken Doherty	6
(England) Jimmy White	3

Quarter-finals; Best of 11 frames
(Wales) Darren Morgan	6
(England) Peter Ebdon	5
(Northern Ireland) Joe Swail	6
(England) Ronnie O'Sullivan	5
(England) Steve Davis	6
(Thailand) James Wattana	3
(Republic of Ireland) Ken Doherty	6
(Scotland) Stephen Hendry	5

Semi-finals; Best of 11 frames
(Wales) Darren Morgan	6
(Northern Ireland) Joe Swail	5
(England) Steve Davis	6
(Republic of Ireland) Ken Doherty	4

Final; Best of 17 frames
(Wales) Darren Morgan	9
(England) Steve Davis	8
