= Gary Wilkinson (snooker player) =

English snooker player

Personal information
- Born: 7 April 1966 (age 60) Kirkby-in-Ashfield, Nottinghamshire, England

Sport
- Country: England
- Sport: Snooker
- Professional: 1987–2006
- Highest ranking: 5 (1991/1992)
- Best ranking finish: Runner-up (x1)

Gary Wilkinson (born 7 April 1966) is an English former professional snooker player. He was the runner-up of the 1991 British Open, and twice a quarter-finalist at the World Snooker Championship. He was ranked fifth in the world during the 1991/1992 season.

== Career ==
Wilkinson turned professional in 1987. In 1988, he won the non-ranking WPBSA Invitation Event beating Alex Higgins 5–4 in the final. He climbed the rankings to reach the no. 5 spot in the world within four seasons. At the 1989 UK Championship, he led John Parrott 7–0 and 8–1 in their Last 16 match before winning 9–6, then whitewashing Jimmy White 9–0 in the quarter-finals, and then leading world number 1 Steve Davis 4–0, 6–2 and 8–7 in the semi-finals, before Wilkinson misread the score thinking that Davis didn't need snookers and went for a risky shot. It proved costly as Davis came back to get the snookers he needed, win that frame and then the deciding frame as Davis won 9–8. Wilkinson failed to sustain his late 1980s and early 1990s results and has never won a ranking tournament, losing in the final of the 1991 British Open 9–10 to Stephen Hendry, losing the 1992 Scottish Masters final 8–10 to Neal Foulds, as well as losing in four ranking semi-finals. At the 1991 World Championship, Wilkinson missed the chance of a 147 maximum break and a £100,000 prize in his first-round match against Doug Mountjoy after missing the final yellow off its spot, and eventually lost 3–13 to Jimmy White in the quarter-finals.

Wilkinson spent a decade in the top 32, but without reaching a ranking semi-final after 1992. He has made ten appearances in the World Championship. His best runs were to the quarter-finals in 1991 and 1995. After dropping off the main tour, he played in the International Open Series whilst also working as a tournament assistant for World Snooker. Wilkinson captured one major title when he won the 1991 World Matchplay. Wilkinson defeated Dean Reynolds 5–1, world champion John Parrott 9–8, Jimmy White 9–6 and then beat Steve Davis 18–11 in the final to win the title and the £70,000 winner's cheque.

== Performance and rankings timeline ==
Tournament	1987/ 88	1988/ 89	1989/ 90	1990/ 91	1991/ 92		1992/ 93	1993/ 94	1994/ 95	1995/ 96	1996/ 97	1997/ 98	1998/ 99	1999/ 00	2000/ 01	2001/ 02	2002/ 03	2003/ 04	2004/ 05	2005/ 06
Ranking (Note: From the 2010/2011 season it shows the ranking at the beginning of the season.)	(Note: New players on the Main Tour don't have a ranking.)	45	39	19	5		8	17	22	23	19	17	17	29	34	37	46	44	56	78
Ranking tournaments
Grand Prix (Note: The event was also called the LG Cup (2001/2002–2003/2004))	3R	2R	2R	3R	2R		2R	QF	1R	1R	2R	1R	3R	2R	LQ	1R	1R	LQ	LQ	LQ
UK Championship	1R	2R	SF	3R	2R		3R	1R	2R	3R	2R	3R	1R	1R	LQ	1R	LQ	LQ	LQ	LQ
Malta Cup (Note: The event was also called the European Open (1988/1989–1996/1997 and 2001/2002–2003/2004) and Irish Open (1998/1999))	NH	2R	LQ	2R	2R		2R	1R	1R	LQ	LQ	NH	LQ	Not Held		LQ	LQ	LQ	LQ	LQ
Welsh Open	Tournament Not Held				QF		3R	2R	1R	2R	1R	2R	1R	1R	LQ	LQ	LQ	LQ	LQ	LQ
China Open (Note: The event was also called the China International (1997/1998–1998/1999))	Tournament Not Held											NR	LQ	LQ	LQ	LQ	Not Held		LQ	LQ
World Championship	LQ	1R	1R	QF	1R		2R	LQ	QF	2R	1R	LQ	LQ	1R	LQ	LQ	1R	LQ	LQ	LQ
Non-ranking tournaments
Pot Black	Tournament Not Held				QF		SF	1R	Tournament Not Held											A
The Masters	A	A	A	WR	1R		QF	LQ	LQ	LQ	LQ	LQ	LQ	LQ	LQ	LQ	LQ	LQ	A	A
Former ranking tournaments
Canadian Masters	NR	LQ	Tournament Not Held																	
Hong Kong Open (Note: The event was also called the Australian Masters (1986/1987–1987/1988 and 1995/1996) and Australian Open (1994/1995))	NR	NH	SF	Tournament Not Held				NR		Tournament Not Held										
Classic	LQ	1R	3R	QF	3R		Tournament Not Held													
Strachan Open	Tournament Not Held				2R		Tournament Not Held													
Dubai Classic (Note: The event was also called the Dubai Masters (1988/1989), Thailand Classic (1995/1996) and Asian Classic (1996/1997))	NH	NR	2R	SF	1R		3R	LQ	1R	1R	2R	Tournament Not Held								
German Masters (Note: The event was also called the German Open (1995/1996–1997/1998))	Tournament Not Held									1R	1R	2R	NR	Tournament Not Held						
Malta Grand Prix	Tournament Not Held								Non-Ranking Event					1R	NR	Tournament Not Held				
Thailand Masters (Note: The event was also called the Asian Open (1989/1990–1992/1993) and Thailand Open (1993/1994–1996/1997))	Not Held		SF	1R	1R		1R	LQ	QF	LQ	1R	1R	LQ	LQ	LQ	LQ	NR	Not Held		
Scottish Open (Note: The event was also called the International Open (1987/1988–1989/1990 and 1992/1993–1996/1997) and Players Championship (2003/2004))	1R	LQ	LQ	Not Held			1R	3R	1R	2R	2R	2R	1R	2R	LQ	2R	LQ	1R	Not Held	
British Open	3R	1R	1R	F	3R		1R	1R	1R	3R	3R	3R	3R	1R	2R	1R	LQ	LQ	LQ	NH
Irish Masters	Non-Ranking Event																LQ	1R	LQ	NH
Former non-ranking tournaments
English Professional Championship	1R	SF	Tournament Not Held																	
Shoot-Out	Not Held			2R	Tournament Not Held															
World Masters	Not Held			3R	Tournament Not Held															
London Masters	NH	A	A	QF	Tournament Not Held															
Thailand Masters	Not Held		Ranking		QF		Ranking Event										NR	Not Held		
Hong Kong Challenge	A	A	NH	A	QF		Tournament Not Held													
Indian Challenge	Tournament Not Held				SF		Tournament Not Held													
Belgian Challenge	Tournament Not Held				QF		Tournament Not Held													
European Challenge	Tournament Not Held				SF	SF	A	Tournament Not Held												
Kent Classic	A	A	A	A	NH		1R	Tournament Not Held												
Scottish Masters	A	NH	A	A	SF		F	A	A	A	A	A	A	A	A	A	A	Not Held		
Belgian Masters	Not Held			A	QF		QF	Not Held		A	Tournament Not Held									
World Matchplay	NH	A	A	QF	W		QF	Tournament Not Held												
Irish Masters	A	A	A	A	1R		1R	A	A	A	A	A	A	A	A	A	Ranking Event			NH
Pontins Professional	A	A	A	A	SF		QF	SF	SF	A	A	A	A	A	Tournament Not Held					
Malta Masters	Tournament Not Held									QF	Tournament Not Held									

Performance table legend
LQ	lost in the qualifying draw	#R	lost in the early rounds of the tournament (WR = Wildcard round, RR = Round robin)	QF	lost in the quarter-finals
SF	lost in the semi–finals	F	lost in the final	W	won the tournament
DNQ	did not qualify for the tournament	A	did not participate in the tournament	WD	withdrew from the tournament

NH / Not Held	event was not held.
NR / Non-Ranking Event	event is/was no longer a ranking event.
R / Ranking Event	event is/was a ranking event.
MR / Minor-Ranking Event	event is/was a minor-ranking event.

== Career finals ==
=== Ranking finals: 1 ===
Outcome	No.	Year	Championship	Opponent in the final	Score
Runner-up	1.	1991	British Open	(Scotland) Stephen Hendry	9–10

=== Non-ranking finals: 3 (2 titles) ===
Outcome	No.	Year	Championship	Opponent in the final	Score
Winner	1.	1988	WPBSA Invitational Event 1	(Northern Ireland) Alex Higgins	5–4
Winner	2.	1991	World Matchplay	(England) Steve Davis	18–11
Runner-up	1.	1992	Scottish Masters	(England) Neal Foulds	8–10

=== Pro-am finals: 1 (1 title) ===
Outcome	No.	Year	Championship	Opponent in the final	Score
Winner	1.	1986	Watney's Open	(England) Andrew Shaw	3–1

=== Amateur finals: 2 (1 title) ===
Outcome	No.	Year	Championship	Opponent in the final	Score
Winner	1.	1985	WPBSA Pro Ticket Series Event 4	(England) Jim Chambers	5–1
Runner-up	1.	2007	PIOS Event 1	(England) Simon Bedford	3–6
