= 1989 Pontins Professional =

Snooker tournament

Tournament information
- Dates: 6–13 May 1989
- Venue: Pontin's
- City: Prestatyn
- Country: Wales
- Organisation: WPBSA
- Format: Non-Ranking event
- Winner's share: £3,500

Final
- Champion: (Wales) Darren Morgan
- Runner-up: (Malta) Tony Drago
- Score: 9–2

The 1989 Pontins Professional was the sixteenth edition of the professional invitational snooker tournament which took place between 6 and 13 May 1989 at Pontin's in Prestatyn, Wales.

The tournament featured eight professional players. The quarter-final matches were contested over the best of 9 frames, the semi-final matches over the best of 11 frames, and the final over the best of 17 frames.

Darren Morgan won the event for the first time, beating Tony Drago 9–2 in the final.

== Main draw ==
Quarter-finals; Best of 9 frames
(Wales) Darren Morgan	5
(England) Mike Hallett	2
(England) Martin Clark	5
(Wales) Doug Mountjoy	0
(Malta) Tony Drago	5
(Wales) Cliff Wilson	3
(England) Tony Meo	5
(England) John Parrott	3

Semi-finals; Best of 11 frames
(Wales) Darren Morgan	6
(England) Martin Clark	5
(Malta) Tony Drago	6
(England) Tony Meo	4

Final; Best of 17 frames
(Wales) Darren Morgan	9
(Malta) Tony Drago	2
