= 2001 British Open =

2001 Stan James British Open
Tournament information
- Dates: 29 September – 7 October 2001
- Venue: Telewest Arena
- City: Newcastle-upon-Tyne
- Country: England
- Organisation: WPBSA
- Format: Ranking event
- Total prize fund: £666,800

Final
- Champion: John Higgins (SCO)
- Runner-up: Graeme Dott (SCO)
- Score: 9–6

The 2001 British Open (officially the 2001 Stan James British Open) was a professional ranking snooker tournament, that was held from 29 September–7 October 2001 at the Telewest Arena, Newcastle-upon-Tyne, England.

John Higgins won the tournament by defeating Graeme Dott nine frames to six in the final. The defending champion, Peter Ebdon, was defeated by Mark King in the quarter-final.

== Main draw ==
Last 48; Best of 9 frames
(England) John Parrott	5
(England) Peter Lines	3
(England) Andy Hicks	5
(Scotland) Billy Snaddon	4
(Wales) Dominic Dale	5
(Scotland) Euan Henderson	1
(Wales) Anthony Davies	5
(England) Neal Foulds	3
(England) Ian McCulloch	5
(England) Anthony Hamilton	4
(England) Steve Davis	5
(England) Sean Storey	3
(Scotland) Drew Henry	5
(England) David Roe	1
(England) David Gray	5
(Pakistan) Shokat Ali	3
(Wales) Paul Davies	5
(Republic of Ireland) Michael Judge	3
(England) Ali Carter	5
(Thailand) James Wattana	0
(Hong Kong) Marco Fu	5
(England) Brian Morgan	0
(England) Joe Perry	5
(Northern Ireland) Patrick Wallace	1
(England) Jonathan Birch	5
(England) Nigel Bond	1
(Australia) Quinten Hann	5
(England) Alfie Burden	1
(Finland) Robin Hull	5
(Malta) Tony Drago	4
(England) Gary Wilkinson	5
(Scotland) Chris Small	3

Last 32; Best of 9 frames
(England) Peter Ebdon	5
(England) John Parrott	4
(England) Jimmy White	2
(England) Andy Hicks	5
(England) Mark King	5
(Wales) Dominic Dale	2
(Scotland) Stephen Hendry	1
(Wales) Anthony Davies	5
(England) Stephen Lee	5
(England) Ian McCulloch	2
(Republic of Ireland) Fergal O'Brien	5
(England) Steve Davis	3
(England) Dave Harold	5
(Scotland) Drew Henry	2
(Scotland) John Higgins	5
(England) David Gray	4
(Wales) Mark Williams	5
(Wales) Paul Davies	4
(England) Paul Hunter	3
(England) Ali Carter	5
(Scotland) Graeme Dott	5
(Hong Kong) Marco Fu	1
(Wales) Matthew Stevens	2
(England) Joe Perry	5
(Republic of Ireland) Ken Doherty	5
(England) Jonathan Birch	2
(Scotland) Alan McManus	5
(Australia) Quinten Hann	2
(Northern Ireland) Joe Swail	5
(Finland) Robin Hull	1
(England) Ronnie O'Sullivan	5
(England) Gary Wilkinson	0

Last 16; Best of 9 frames
(England) Peter Ebdon	5
(England) Andy Hicks	3
(England) Mark King	5
(Wales) Anthony Davies	0
(England) Stephen Lee	5
(Republic of Ireland) Fergal O'Brien	2
(England) Dave Harold	2
(Scotland) John Higgins	5
(Wales) Mark Williams	2
(England) Ali Carter	5
(Scotland) Graeme Dott	5
(England) Joe Perry	4
(Republic of Ireland) Ken Doherty	4
(Scotland) Alan McManus	5
(Northern Ireland) Joe Swail	4
(England) Ronnie O'Sullivan	5

Quarter-finals; Best of 9 frames
(England) Peter Ebdon	0
(England) Mark King	5
(England) Stephen Lee	4
(Scotland) John Higgins	5
(England) Ali Carter	3
(Scotland) Graeme Dott	5
(Scotland) Alan McManus	1
(England) Ronnie O'Sullivan	5

Semi-finals; Best of 11 frames
(England) Mark King	0
(Scotland) John Higgins	6
(Scotland) Graeme Dott	6
(England) Ronnie O'Sullivan	4

Final; Best of 17 frames
(Scotland) John Higgins	9
(Scotland) Graeme Dott	6

== Final ==
Final: Best of 17 frames. Referee: John Williams; Telewest Arena, Newcastle-upon-Tyne, England. 7 October 2001.
John Higgins; Scotland	9–6	Graeme Dott; Scotland
Afternoon: 48–78 (78), 57–81, 80–0 (79), 11–62, 62–38, 138–0 (90), 97–16 (61), 68–6; Evening: 93–6 (93), 0–100 (100), 45–70, 126–1 (112), 71–43, 14–75, 52–40
112	Highest break	100
1	Century breaks	1
5	50+ breaks	2
