= Ken Doherty =

Irish snooker player (born 1969)

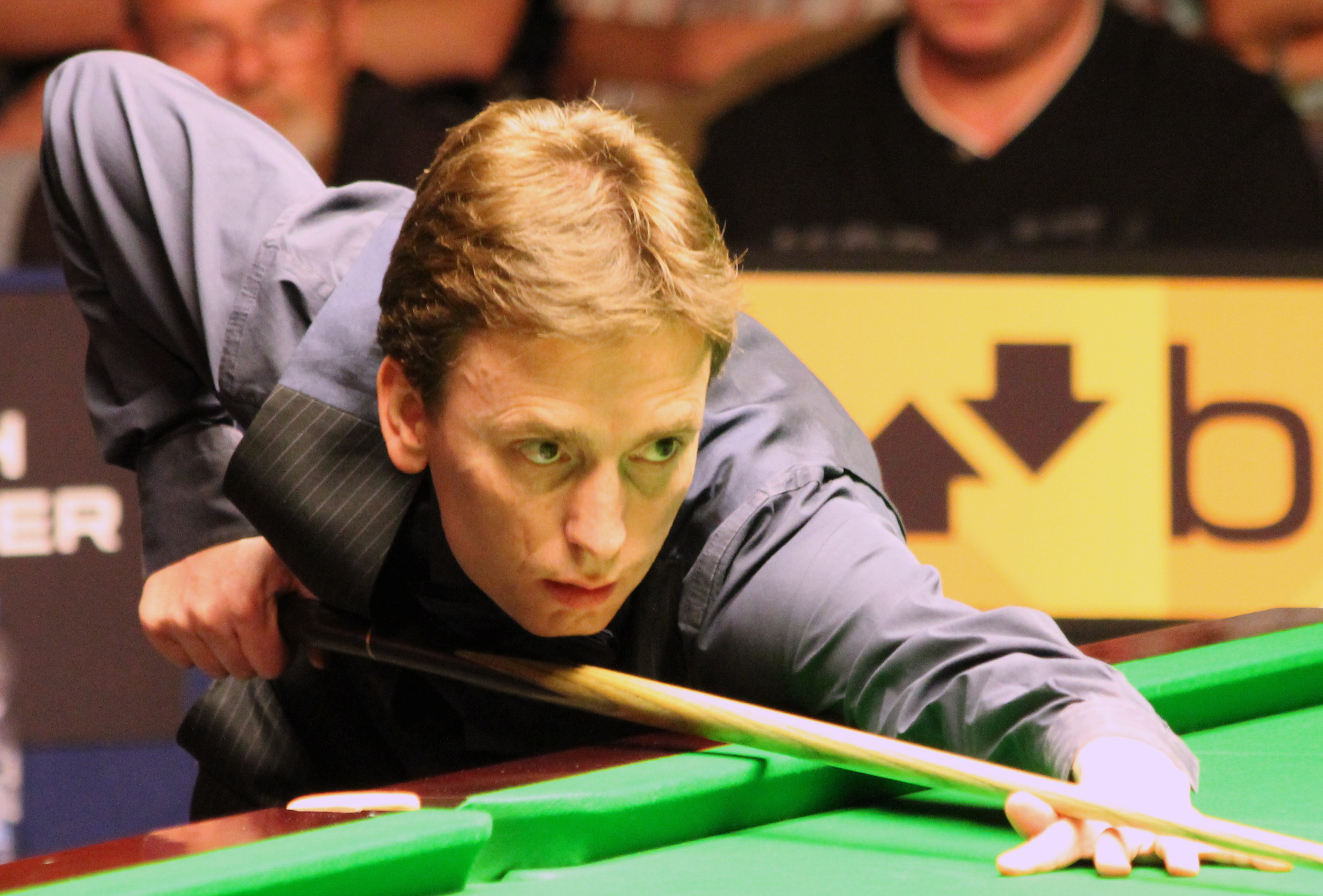
- Doherty in 2012

Personal information
- Nicknames: The Darlin' of Dublin; Crafty Ken
- Born: 17 September 1969 (age 57) Ranelagh, County Dublin, Ireland

Sport
- Country: Ireland
- Sport: Snooker
- Professional: 1990–2026
- Highest ranking: 2 (2006/07)
- Maximum breaks: 1
- Century breaks: 360

Tournament wins
- Ranking: 6
- World Championship: 1997

Kenneth Joseph Doherty (born 17 September 1969) is an Irish retired professional snooker player who also works as a commentator and pundit on televised snooker broadcasts. From Ranelagh in Dublin, he is the sport's only world champion from the Republic of Ireland, having won the title in 1997, and one of only seven players from outside the United Kingdom to have won the title in the modern era. He is the only player to have been world under-21, world amateur and world professional champion.

After moving from Dublin to London to pursue his snooker career, Doherty won the World Under-21 Amateur Championship and the World Amateur Championship in 1989. He turned professional the following year and reached the first of his 17 ranking finals at the 1992 Grand Prix, losing 9–10 to Jimmy White. He won the first of his six ranking titles several months later at the 1993 Welsh Open, beating Alan McManus 9–7 in the final, which helped him enter the top 16 for the first time in the 1993–94 world rankings. At the 1997 World Snooker Championship, he ended Stephen Hendry's record 29-match winning streak at the Crucible with an 18–12 victory in the final.

Doherty was runner-up at two other World Championships. As defending champion at the 1998 event, he had an opportunity to break the Crucible curse but lost the final 12–18 to John Higgins. Facing Mark Williams in the 2003 final, Doherty recovered from 2–10 behind to tie the scores at 11–11 but lost 16–18. In other Triple Crown events, he was UK Championship runner-up three times (losing 5–10 to Hendry in 1994, 1–10 to Ronnie O'Sullivan in 2001 and 9–10 to Williams in 2002), and Masters runner-up twice (losing 8–10 to Higgins in 1999 and by the same score to Matthew Stevens in 2000).

Doherty won his final ranking title at the 2006 Malta Cup, where he defeated Higgins 9–8 in the final. He achieved his career highest ranking of second in the 2006/2007 rankings. After 15 consecutive seasons within the top 16, Doherty fell to 18th place in the 2008/2009 rankings and 44th place in the 2009/2010 rankings, after which he never regained a top-16 standing. From the end of the 2016–17 season, he finished outside the top 64 multiple times but remained on the professional tour though invitational tour cards; the most recent was in June 2024 for the 2024–25 and 2025–26 seasons. Doherty also competes on the World Seniors Tour, where he won the 2018 UK Seniors Championship and has twice been runner-up at the World Seniors Championship, in 2020 and 2024. Since 2012, he has been a director of the World Professional Billiards and Snooker Association; he also served from 2021 to 2024 as inaugural chair of the WPBSA Players organisation. He announced his retirement from professional snooker on 3 June 2026.

== Early life ==
Born on 17 September 1969, Doherty grew up in a working-class Catholic family in Ranelagh, Dublin, with his three siblings, two older brothers and a younger sister. He first became interested in snooker when he started to watch the BBC programme Pot Black with his father at eight years old. At the time, Doherty particularly admired Alex Higgins. He received a miniature snooker table as a Christmas present, and soon afterwards began playing on full-sized tables at Jason's Snooker Hall in Ranelagh. When he was 13 years old, his father died from a heart attack. Shortly afterwards, he won the Irish Under-16 Championship. After leaving school, he moved to London to pursue his snooker career, receiving free accommodation and practice time at Ilford Snooker Centre courtesy of Irish professional Eugene Hughes. He won the World Under-21 Amateur Championship and the World Amateur Championship in 1989, and turned professional the following year.

== Career ==
Doherty appeared in two quarter-finals in his first season as a professional, at the 1991 Classic and the 1991 Irish Masters, being beaten 5–3 by Jimmy White on both occasions. In the following snooker year, he won the qualifying event for the 1992 Masters, though there he lost 1–5 to John Parrott in the first round. He also made it to the semi-finals of the 1992 British and Strachan Open, and reached the final of the 1992 Irish Masters. He was a finalist at the 1992 Grand Prix as well, narrowly losing 10–9 to Jimmy White. In the same event a year later, Doherty lost in the final again, this time 6–9 to Peter Ebdon.

Doherty's first ranking title was the 1993 Welsh Open, enough to take him into the top 16 in the world, where he remained until the 2007–08 season. He also won the 1993 Irish Professional Championship, was a semi-finalist at the 1993 International Open, and a quarter-finalist again at the 1993 Irish Masters. More quarter-final appearances followed at the 1994 Masters and the 1994 World Championship, his only run past the second round in the latter before 1997, and later on in the 1994 Dubai Classic, repeating his result from the previous edition of the event, down to the scoreline as he was beaten 5–4 both times. These weren't his only replicated outcomes, he also won the 1994 Pontins Professional just like he did last year, as well as the 1994 Scottish Masters after winning it in 1993 too. In November he made it to the final of the 1994 UK Championship, which he lost 5–10 to Stephen Hendry, then in December he reached the quarter-final stage of the 1994 European Open, where he was defeated 5–3 by Nigel Bond. In the second half of the season, he was in yet another quarter-final at the 1995 Irish Masters, and in two finals, at the 1995 Pontins Professional and the 1995 European League.

Doherty became only the third player from outside the United Kingdom (after Australian Horace Lindrum in 1952 and Canadian Cliff Thorburn in 1980) to win the World Championship when he beat Stephen Hendry 18–12 in the 1997 final, at the age of 27. He also reached the World Championship final in 1998, losing to John Higgins, and in 2003, losing narrowly to Mark Williams. The latter run was noted for some outstanding comebacks, including final-frame wins over Graeme Dott and Shaun Murphy, a 13–8 win over Higgins in a match where Doherty raced ahead 10–0 but Higgins fought back to 10–7, and a semi-final fightback from 9–15 to beat Paul Hunter 17–16. In that championship, Doherty played more frames than anyone before or since. In the final, Williams led 11–4, but Doherty fought back to 12–12 and 16–16. In frame 33, Doherty missed the penultimate red with a clearance easily available. Williams won that crucial frame and the next to prevail 18–16.

Doherty narrowly failed to achieve a maximum break when he missed a routine final black off its spot in the 15th frame of the 2000 Benson & Hedges Masters final against Matthew Stevens, a match Doherty eventually lost 10–8. This one pot would have seen him win an £80,000 sports car. However, his 140 break at least brought him the consolation of the £19,000 highest break prize. He did make a 147 break two years later though, when he won the Cue Club Pro-Am tournament in Killarney in 2002. He made light of his prize on television shortly afterwards, which was allegedly €300, a BMX bicycle and a toy Ferrari car. His first official maximum was compiled in 2012, during a first round win against Julian Treiber at the Paul Hunter Classic.

In 2001 Doherty became one of the few players who have won back-to-back ranking events, as he won the Welsh Open and the Thailand Masters, while also reaching the final of the next tournament, the Regal Scottish Open.

In the 2005 World Championship, Doherty beat Barry Pinches in the first round 10–5, winning the last 8 frames, but was knocked out in the second round by Alan McManus 13–11.

Following an average start to the 2005–06 season, Doherty won the Malta Cup in February 2006, beating John Higgins in the final. Doherty had trailed 8–5 at one stage but managed a stirring comeback, winning four frames in a row. He called the victory, which bridged a five-year gap, his "most important tournament win since the World Championship".

Doherty started brightly in the 2006 World Championship, winning his first match by defeating Barry Hawkins 10–1, then he beat Matthew Stevens 13–8, playing superbly to win the last five frames. He was the favourite in his quarter-final match against Marco Fu but lost 13–10. It was 8–8 as the final session started, but Doherty struggled despite winning a frame in which he required three snookers. Although he led 7–6, 8–7, 9–8 and 10–9, he could never quite take decisive advantage to win the match. Doherty admitted afterwards that he "blew it" but that he still had "a couple more years" to come back and win the title. He ended the 2005–06 season as the world number 2, his highest ranking ever.

He made a solid start to the 2006–07 season by reaching the quarter-final at what is the closest thing to a home tournament for him, the Northern Ireland Trophy at Belfast's Waterfront Hall. He followed this up with a last-16 defeat at the Grand Prix in Aberdeen and the UK Championship in York. He reached the quarter-finals of the next two tournaments, the Masters and the Malta Cup. He lost in the first round of the World Championship and, although clearly disappointed, the Dubliner vowed to continue. He was provisional world number 1 for most of 2006–07, but finished the season as 4th in the rankings.

In October 2006, he won the invitational Irish Professional Championship for a second time, having previously captured the title in 1993. He beat Michael Judge 9–4 in the final. A year later he defended his title with a resounding 9–2 victory over Fergal O'Brien. He followed this up a week later by becoming the first Irishman to win the Pot Black Invitational tournament, beating Shaun Murphy 76–31 in the one-frame final.

Doherty did not start the 2007–08 season well, winning only one match during the first four ranking tournaments. However, he did reach the semi-finals of the Masters with victories over Mark Williams and Shaun Murphy, before losing to eventual champion Mark Selby. He then reached the final of the Malta Cup for a record fifth time, defeating John Higgins in the semi-finals, before losing to Murphy in the final. Unfortunately for Doherty, neither of these events are ranking events, meaning his performances did nothing to keep him in the top rankings for the 2008–09 season. Defeat to Liang Wenbo in the first round of the World Championship ensured that he dropped out of the top 16 after 15 years, and he started the new season 32nd on the provisional one-year list. A run of qualifying defeats saw him drop as low as 38th before the UK Championship.

Doherty's poor run of form continued during the 2008–09 season during which he won only two matches. For the first time since 1993, he failed to qualify for the World Championship, having been beaten in the final qualifying round by Gerard Greene.

Doherty's form saw an upturn in the 2009–10 season, with a rise back into the top 32 in the rankings, up from 44th to 30th; this was due to a quarter-final appearance in the 2009 Shanghai Masters, and a last-16 appearance in the 2009 Grand Prix. Doherty defeated six-time World Championship finalist Jimmy White 10–3, and two-time Crucible semi-finalist Joe Swail 10–1 to mark his return to the World Championship for the first time since 2008. In an amusing moment, Doherty got down on his knees and kissed the carpet upon his return to the venue. However, he lost his first-round match 10–4 to reigning Masters champion Mark Selby.

The 2010–11 season proved to be a mixed campaign for Doherty, who made it to the last 32 of the 2010 World Open, yet missed out on qualifying for the 2011 German Masters, the 2011 Welsh Open and crucially, blowing a 6–3 lead, losing 10–6 to Jimmy Robertson in the final stage of qualifying for the 2011 World Championship, meaning he had only reached the Crucible once out of his previous three attempts.

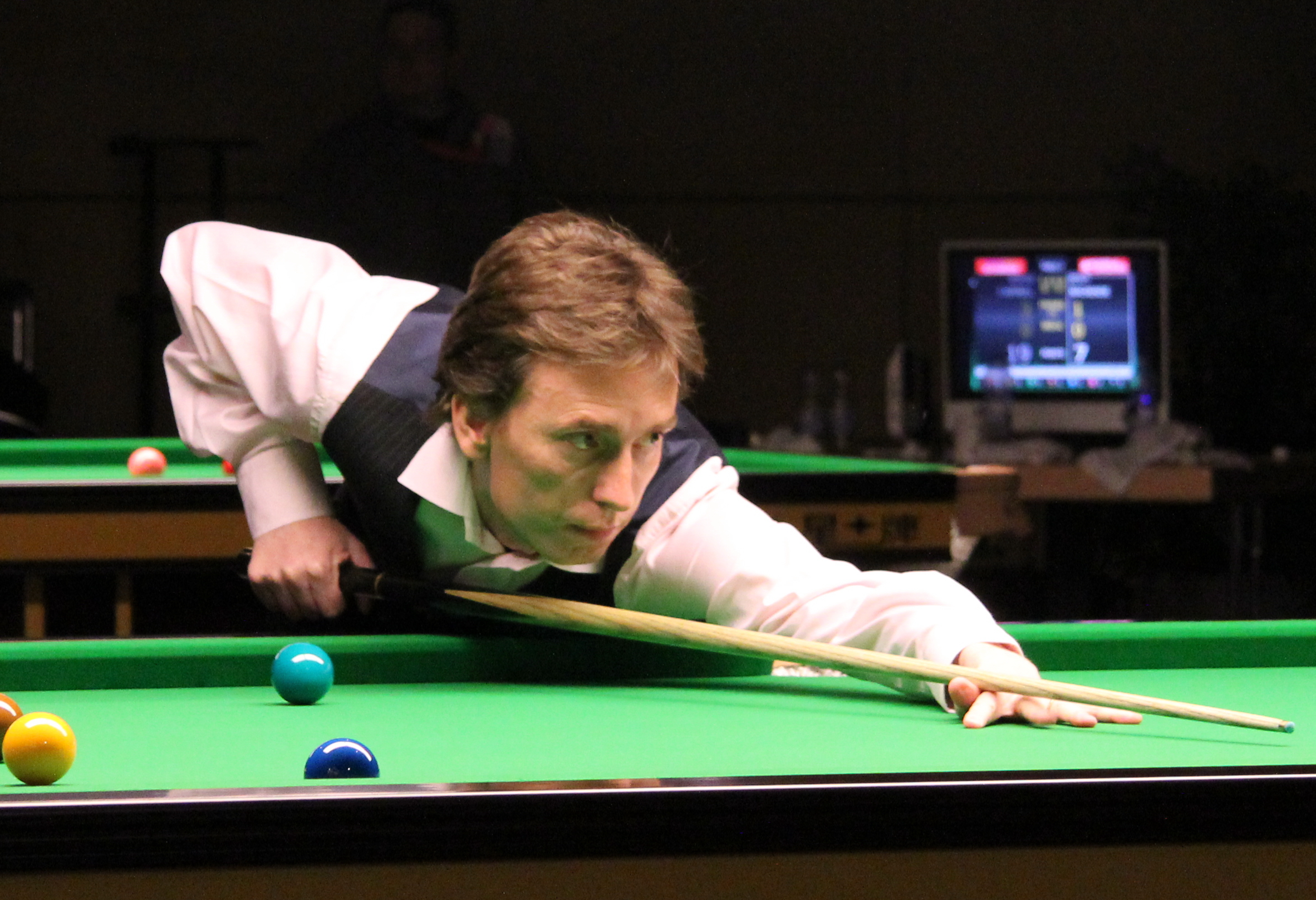
2011 Paul Hunter Classic

Doherty had an excellent start to the 2011–12 season as he qualified for the Australian Goldfields Open, where he reached his first ranking event semi-final since 2006. He beat Mark Selby 5–3 in the quarter-finals, sealing the match with a clearance which he described as the best of his career. Doherty also stated that he almost quit the game in 2009, following his downturn in form which saw him drop to world number 55. He failed to replicate his form in the semi-finals, however, as he was beaten 2–6 by Mark Williams. In the remainder of the season Doherty qualified for the German Masters and the Welsh Open, but was defeated in the first round by Williams and Mark Allen respectively, without picking up a frame. He also reached the final of the non-ranking Irish Classic, losing 2–5 to Fergal O'Brien.

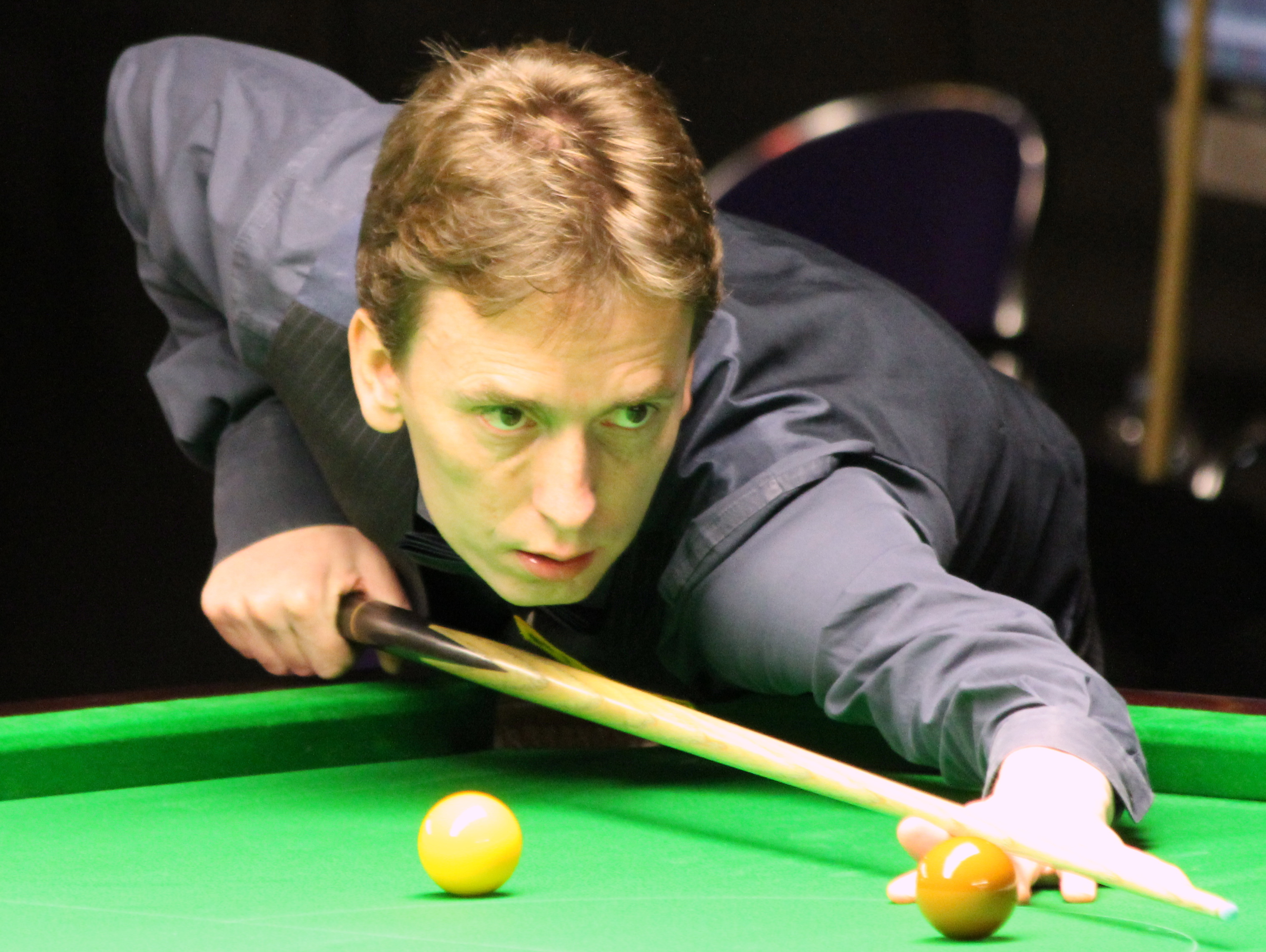
2012 Paul Hunter Classic

He was ranked 32nd in the world going into the 2012 World Championship qualifiers, where he faced Anthony Hamilton. The match went into a deciding frame with Doherty 40 points behind, but he profited from a Hamilton error to produce a match-winning clearance to win 10–9, and earned a first-round match against Neil Robertson. He lost 4–10, and finished the season ranked world number 35.

Doherty began the 2012–13 season by losing 4–5 to Stuart Bingham in the second round of the Wuxi Classic, and 3–5 to Martin Gould in the first round of the Australian Goldfields Open. He went on to reach the quarter-finals of the event, losing 0–4 to Mark Selby. Doherty was defeated in qualifying for the Shanghai Masters and the 2012 UK Championship, and failed to advance beyond the wildcard round of the International Championship. At the fifth European Tour Event, the Scottish Open, he saw off the likes of Luca Brecel and Ryan Day to reach the semi-finals where he lost 2–4 to Ding Junhui. Doherty was eliminated in the first round of the German Masters by Peter Lines, but then had his best run of the season at the Welsh Open. He beat four-time world champion John Higgins 4–1 and Tom Ford 4–3 to make it through to the quarter-finals. He led Stuart Bingham 2–0, but a series of missed pots saw Doherty lose his confidence and he went on to lose 3–5. His aforementioned run to the semi-finals of the Scottish Open helped him finish 16th on the PTC Order of Merit to qualify as one of the top 26 players for the Finals, but he lost 2–4 to Kurt Maflin in the first round. Doherty almost pulled off one of his trademark comebacks against Matthew Selt in the final round of the World Championship qualifying, as from 4–9 down he levelled at 9–9, but he lost the deciding frame. The result meant that this was the first season where Doherty had not featured in any of snooker's Triple Crown events. Doherty increased his ranking by eight spots during the season to finish it ranked world number 27.

Doherty qualified for all but two of the ranking events in the 2013–14 season, but couldn't advance beyond the second round in any of them. In April, he qualified for the World Championship after a 10–5 win against Dechawat Poomjaeng in the final qualifying round. Doherty was the oldest player in the draw in his 19th Crucible appearance, and after trailing Stuart Bingham 5–4 in the opening session of their first round match, Doherty produced his best snooker to take all six frames in the next session and win a match at the Crucible for the first time since 2006. He then lost 13–8 to Alan McManus, the second oldest player in the event.

Doherty won three qualifying matches and a wildcard round to be at the 2014 Shanghai Masters, where he met Mark Selby in the first round, losing 5–2. The only other tournament Doherty could advance to the last 32 in this season was the 2014 UK Championship by overcoming Mitchell Mann and Michael White, but he was beaten 6–1 by Ricky Walden. He was knocked out of the semi-finals of the World Seniors Championship by Fergal O'Brien. He reached the final round of World Championship qualifying following wins over Reanne Evans and Lee Walker, but was thrashed 10–3 by Mark Davis. Doherty was placed 45th in the world rankings at the end of the season, the lowest he had been since 1991.

A 6–0 thrashing at the hands of Peter Ebdon ended Doherty's International Championship run at the first round stage, and he lost 6–3 to Mark Davis in the second round of the 2015 UK Championship, having whitewashed Tony Drago 6–0 in the opener. His best results in the season were a pair of last 32 exits at the German Masters and Welsh Open, losing 5–1 to Stephen Maguire and 4–2 to Joe Perry respectively. His end of season ranking of 57 was the lowest of his 26-year professional career. He had two last 16 showings during 2016–17, and would have dropped off the tour at the end of the season as he was outside of the top 64 in the world rankings. However, the day before the 2017 World Championship started, it was announced that Doherty would receive an invitational tour card for the next two years.

Doherty played against Ronnie O'Sullivan, the defending champion, in the second round of the 2018 UK Championship. Doherty was sharp throughout the first half of the first session, leading 3–1, then he extended his lead further to 4–1, but O'Sullivan fought back to win the next 4 frames. Doherty was able to force a decider, but ultimately just one error from him was enough for his opponent to finish the frame, to prevent Doherty from causing a considerable upset in the tournament where many seeds fell to lower-ranked players already, and more would follow. Doherty would be the only player that came close to defeating the eventual champion, as the other matches, with the exception of the final, produced very one-sided results.

Doherty's loss in the 2020 World Championship qualifying meant that he finished the season outside the top 64 and fell out of the tour. However, he was given an invitational tour card to continue playing professional snooker in the 2020–21 and 2021–22 seasons. The same occurred at his loss in the 2022 World Championship qualifying, for the 2022–23 and 2023–24 seasons, and at the end of the 2023–24 season, when Doherty had dropped to 79 in the world rankings, but was able to remain on the World Snooker Tour after being given a further two-year invitational card by the governing body.

== Playing style ==
Despite being known as a tactician, he is also a heavy scorer at close quarters. This relatively cautious approach has led to the nickname "Crafty Ken".

For most of his career, Doherty played with a warped cue randomly selected from the cue rack in Jason's, a club where he practised. He humorously revealed that the club manager originally wanted £5 for it, but Doherty haggled him down to £2. At the 2025 World Snooker Championship qualifiers, Doherty switched to a different cue for the first time in his professional career, likening the change to a "new romance".

== Media work ==
Doherty works on TV coverage of snooker matches with the BBC snooker coverage team. He became a regular commentator for the BBC starting with the 2009 Masters, following the side-lining of veteran expert Clive Everton. During the COVID-19 pandemic, he began working on ITV's snooker coverage.

Doherty guested as a presenter on the Morning Show on East Coast FM. He presents a sports programme on Sunshine 106.8FM on Saturday mornings.

== Personal life ==
Doherty married Sarah, who is originally from India, in December 2001. The couple resided in Rathgar, Dublin, and have a son, born in 2007. In 2022, Doherty revealed that he and his wife had separated amicably. He now lives in England.

Doherty was nearly blinded in 2002 in a bathroom accident; after slipping, he struck an ornament, which narrowly missed his left eye. However, the distinctive scar on his right cheek dates back to his seventh birthday, when he fell off a shed roof onto a metal dustbin.

In May 2007, Doherty appeared on RTÉ's spoof show Anonymous, heavily disguised as a priest. Ostensibly he was a beginner at snooker and received some tips from Alex Higgins, who was initially fooled by the make-up and Doherty's hopeless play. However, as "Fr Donoghue" began to clear the table, Higgins' suspicions were aroused and Doherty was eventually rumbled. Doherty's disguise was enough to fool his mother and his wife. In 2020, Doherty made a cameo appearance along with Jack Lisowski and Liang Wenbo in the snooker movie Break.

Doherty has been a WPBSA player director since 2012.

== Performance and rankings timeline ==
Tournament	1990/ 91	1991/ 92	1992/ 93	1993/ 94	1994/ 95	1995/ 96	1996/ 97	1997/ 98	1998/ 99	1999/ 00	2000/ 01	2001/ 02	2002/ 03	2003/ 04		2004/ 05	2005/ 06	2006/ 07	2007/ 08	2008/ 09	2009/ 10	2010/ 11	2011/ 12	2012/ 13	2013/ 14	2014/ 15	2015/ 16	2016/ 17	2017/ 18	2018/ 19	2019/ 20	2020/ 21	2021/ 22	2022/ 23	2023/ 24	2024/ 25	2025/ 26
Ranking (Note: It shows the ranking at the beginning of the season)	(Note: New players on the Main Tour don't have a ranking)	51	21	11	7	9	7	3	4	7	7	4	5	6		7	11	2	4	18	44	30	29	35	27	33	45	57	(Note: Players issued an invitational tour card began the season without ranking points)	65	56		73		76		89
Ranking tournaments
Championship League	Tournament Not Held																		Non-Ranking Event													3R	2R	RR	RR	A	A
Saudi Arabia Masters	Tournament Not Held																																			1R	2R
Wuhan Open	Tournament Not Held																																		LQ	LQ	LQ
English Open	Tournament Not Held																											1R	1R	1R	1R	1R	LQ	1R	LQ	A	A
British Open	1R	SF	QF	3R	2R	3R	1R	SF	2R	3R	2R	3R	2R	2R		3R	Tournament Not Held																2R	LQ	1R	LQ	LQ
Xi'an Grand Prix	Tournament Not Held																																			LQ	LQ
Northern Ireland Open	Tournament Not Held																											2R	3R	1R	4R	2R	LQ	LQ	1R	WD	LQ
International Championship	Tournament Not Held																							WR	LQ	LQ	1R	1R	A	1R	1R	Not Held			LQ	LQ	WD
UK Championship	LQ	LQ	2R	3R	F	QF	SF	2R	3R	3R	2R	F	F	2R		2R	QF	3R	1R	1R	LQ	1R	LQ	LQ	1R	3R	2R	1R	2R	2R	1R	1R	1R	LQ	LQ	A	LQ
Shoot Out	Tournament Not Held																					Non-Ranking Event						4R	1R	2R	2R	3R	3R	2R	1R	WD	2R
Scottish Open (Note: The event was called the International Open (1992/1993–1996/1997) and the Players Championship (2003/2004))	Not Held		SF	2R	3R	1R	2R	QF	SF	3R	F	2R	SF	SF		Tournament Not Held								MR	Not Held			1R	1R	1R	1R	1R	1R	1R	LQ	WD	LQ
German Masters (Note: The event was called the German Open (1995/1996–1997/1998))	Tournament Not Held					F	2R	SF	NR	Tournament Not Held												LQ	1R	1R	1R	LQ	1R	LQ	LQ	LQ	LQ	LQ	1R	LQ	1R	1R	LQ
World Grand Prix	Tournament Not Held																									NR	DNQ	DNQ	DNQ	DNQ	DNQ	DNQ	DNQ	DNQ	DNQ	DNQ	DNQ
Players Championship (Note: The event was called the Players Tour Championship Grand Final (2010/2011–2015/2016))	Tournament Not Held																					DNQ	DNQ	1R	DNQ	DNQ	DNQ	DNQ	DNQ	DNQ	DNQ	DNQ	DNQ	DNQ	DNQ	DNQ	DNQ
Welsh Open	NH	2R	W	3R	1R	2R	3R	1R	1R	3R	W	F	QF	3R		QF	3R	3R	3R	LQ	LQ	LQ	1R	QF	2R	2R	3R	1R	1R	2R	2R	2R	LQ	1R	LQ	LQ	LQ
World Open (Note: The event was called the Grand Prix (1990/1991–2000/2001 and 2004/2005–2009/2010) and the LG Cup (2001/2002–2003/2004))	LQ	2R	F	F	3R	3R	3R	1R	2R	QF	QF	2R	2R	SF		2R	2R	2R	RR	LQ	2R	1R	LQ	LQ	2R	Not Held		LQ	1R	LQ	1R	Not Held			LQ	LQ	LQ
Tour Championship	Tournament Not Held																													DNQ	DNQ	DNQ	DNQ	DNQ	DNQ	DNQ	DNQ
World Championship	1R	LQ	LQ	QF	1R	2R	W	F	QF	2R	QF	QF	F	1R		2R	QF	1R	1R	LQ	1R	LQ	1R	LQ	2R	LQ	LQ	LQ	LQ	LQ	LQ	LQ	LQ	LQ	LQ	LQ	LQ
Non-ranking tournaments
The Masters	LQ	1R	1R	QF	1R	1R	SF	SF	F	F	QF	1R	SF	QF		1R	1R	QF	SF	LQ	LQ	A	A	A	A	A	A	A	A	A	A	A	A	A	A	A	A
Championship League	Tournament Not Held																		2R	RR	A	A	A	A	A	A	A	A	A	A	A	A	A	A	A	A	A
World Seniors Championship	NH	A	Tournament Not Held																			QF	A	A	A	SF	1R	A	A	NH	A	F	QF	1R	F	1R	2R
Former ranking tournaments
Classic	QF	3R	Tournament Not Held																																		
Strachan Open (Note: The event was called the Strachan Challenge (1992/1993–1993/1994))	NH	SF	MR	NR	Tournament Not Held																																
Asian Classic (Note: The event was called the Dubai Classic (1990/1991–1994/1995) and the Thailand Classic (1995/1996))	1R	2R	2R	QF	QF	1R	SF	Tournament Not Held																													
Malta Grand Prix	Tournament Not Held				Non-Ranking Event					W	NR	Tournament Not Held																									
Thailand Masters (Note: The event was called the Asian Open (1990/1991–1992/1993) and the Thailand Open (1993/1994–1996/97))	LQ	2R	2R	2R	2R	F	2R	SF	QF	SF	W	QF	NR	Not Held			NR	Tournament Not Held																			
Irish Masters	Non-Ranking Event												1R	SF		2R	NH	NR	Tournament Not Held																		
Northern Ireland Trophy	Tournament Not Held																NR	QF	3R	2R	Tournament Not Held																
Bahrain Championship	Tournament Not held																			1R	Tournament Not held																
Wuxi Classic (Note: The event was called the Jiangsu Classic (2008/2009–2009/2010))	Tournament Not Held																			Non-Ranking Event				2R	1R	1R	Tournament Not Held										
Australian Goldfields Open (Note: The event was called the Australian Open (1994/1995) and the Australian Masters (1995/1996))	Tournament Not Held				Non-Ranking		Tournament Not Held																SF	1R	1R	LQ	LQ	Tournament Not Held									
Shanghai Masters	Tournament Not Held																		1R	LQ	QF	1R	LQ	LQ	LQ	1R	LQ	LQ	A	Non-Ranking		Not Held			Non-Ranking		
Paul Hunter Classic (Note: The event was called the Grand Prix Fürth (2004/2005) and the Fürth German Open (2005/2006–2006/2007))	Tournament Not Held															Pro-am Event						Minor-Ranking Event						A	3R	A	NR	Tournament Not Held					
Indian Open	Tournament Not Held																								1R	1R	NH	LQ	3R	LQ	Tournament Not Held						
China Open (Note: The event was called the China International (1997/1998–1998/1999))	Tournament Not Held							NR	QF	LQ	2R	QF	Not Held			SF	SF	QF	2R	LQ	LQ	LQ	LQ	1R	1R	1R	LQ	LQ	LQ	2R	Tournament Not Held						
Riga Masters (Note: The event was called the Riga Open (2014/2015–2015/2016))	Tournament Not Held																									Minor-Rank		3R	SF	A	A	Tournament Not Held					
China Championship	Tournament Not Held																											NR	1R	1R	WD	Tournament Not Held					
WST Pro Series	Tournament Not Held																															RR	Tournament Not Held				
Turkish Masters	Tournament Not Held																																LQ	Tournament Not Held			
Gibraltar Open	Tournament Not Held																										MR	WD	4R	3R	1R	2R	2R	Tournament Not Held			
WST Classic	Tournament Not Held																																	A	Not Held		
European Masters (Note: The event was called the European Open (1992/1993–1996/1997), the Irish Open (1998/1999) and the Malta Cup (2004/2005–2007/2008))	3R	LQ	1R	2R	QF	2R	SF	NH	QF	Not Held		SF	2R	1R		2R	W	QF	NR	Tournament Not Held								LQ	2R	1R	LQ	2R	LQ	LQ	1R	Not Held	
Former non-ranking tournaments
World Masters	2R	Tournament Not Held																																			
Top Rank Classic	Tournament Not Held				RR	Tournament Not Held																															
Red & White Challenge	Tournament Not Held					SF	Tournament Not Held																														
Superstar International	Tournament Not Held							SF	Tournament Not Held																												
German Masters	Tournament Not Held					Ranking Event			SF	Tournament Not Held												Ranking Event															
Pontins Professional	A	A	W	W	F	W	SF	SF	QF	QF	Tournament Not Held																										
Malta Grand Prix	Tournament Not Held				A	SF	QF	W	F	R	RR	Tournament Not Held																									
Champions Cup (Note: The event was called the Charity Challenge (1994/1995–1998/1999))	Tournament Not Held				1R	SF	QF	SF	SF	RR	RR	SF	Tournament Not Held																								
Scottish Masters	A	A	A	W	W	QF	QF	QF	1R	QF	SF	QF	1R	Tournament Not Held																							
World Champions v Asia Stars	Tournament Not Held															RR	Tournament Not Held																				
Northern Ireland Trophy	Tournament Not Held																1R	Ranking Event			Tournament Not Held																
Irish Masters	QF	F	QF	1R	QF	SF	1R	W	QF	1R	1R	SF	Ranking Event				NH	QF	Tournament Not Held																		
Euro-Asia Masters Challenge	Tournament Not Held													F	W	Not Held			SF	Tournament Not Held																	
Irish Professional Championship	NH	1R	W	Tournament Not Held													F	W	W	Tournament Not Held																	
Pot Black	A	A	A	1R	Tournament Not Held												A	SF	W	Tournament Not Held																	
Malta Cup	Ranking Event							NH	R	Not Held		Ranking Event							F	Tournament Not Held								Ranking Event									
World Series Jersey	Tournament Not Held																			QF	Tournament Not Held																
World Series Warsaw	Tournament Not Held																			F	Tournament Not Held																
World Series Grand Final	Tournament Not Held																			2R	Tournament Not Held																
World Series Killarney	Tournament Not Held																				SF	Tournament Not Held															
Masters Qualifying Event (Note: The event was called the Benson & Hedges Championship (1990/1991–2002/2003))	3R	W	MR	A	A	A	A	A	A	A	A	A	A	A		NH	A	A	A	SF	1R	Tournament Not Held															
Legends of Snooker	Tournament Not Held																				F	Tournament Not Held															
Irish Classic	Tournament Not Held																		A	W	RR	A	F	Tournament Not Held													
Premier League (Note: The event was called the Matchroom League (1990/1991–1991/1992) and the European League (1992/1993–1996/1997))	A	A	A	A	F	W	SF	W	RR	A	A	A	A	A		A	A	RR	A	A	A	A	A	A	Tournament Not Held												
Shoot Out	4R	Tournament Not Held																				3R	2R	1R	1R	1R	1R	Ranking Event									
Paul Hunter Classic	Tournament Not Held															Pro-am Event						Minor-Ranking Event						Ranking Event			1R	Tournament Not Held					
Six-red World Championship (Note: The event was called the Six-red Snooker International (2008/2009) and the Six-red World Grand Prix (2009/2010))	Tournament Not Held																			3R	3R	RR	NH	2R	2R	2R	2R	A	A	A	RR	Not Held		RR	Not Held		

Performance Table Legend
LQ	lost in the qualifying draw	#R	lost in the early rounds of the tournament (WR = Wildcard round, RR = Round robin)	QF	lost in the quarter-finals
SF	lost in the semi–finals	F	lost in the final	W	won the tournament
DNQ	did not qualify for the tournament	A	did not participate in the tournament	WD	withdrew from the tournament
DQ	disqualified from the tournament				

NH / Not Held	event was not held.
NR / Non-Ranking Event	event is/was no longer a ranking event.
R / Ranking Event	event is/was a ranking event.
MR / Minor-Ranking Event	means an event is/was a minor-ranking event.
PA / Pro-am Event	means an event is/was a pro-am event.

== Career finals ==
=== Ranking finals: 17 (6 titles) ===
Legend
World Championship (1–2)
UK Championship (0–3)
Other (5–6)

Outcome	No.	Year	Championship	Opponent in the final	Score
Runner-up	1.	1992	Grand Prix	(England) Jimmy White	9–10
Winner	1.	1993	Welsh Open	(Scotland) Alan McManus	9–7
Runner-up	2.	1993	Grand Prix (2)	(England) Peter Ebdon	6–9
Runner-up	3.	1994	UK Championship	(Scotland) Stephen Hendry	5–10
Runner-up	4.	1995	German Open	(Scotland) John Higgins	3–9
Runner-up	5.	1996	Thailand Open	(Scotland) Alan McManus	8–9
Winner	2.	1997	World Snooker Championship	(Scotland) Stephen Hendry	18–12
Runner-up	6.	1998	World Snooker Championship	(Scotland) John Higgins	12–18
Winner	3.	2000	Malta Grand Prix	(Wales) Mark Williams	9–3
Winner	4.	2001	Welsh Open (2)	(England) Paul Hunter	9–2
Winner	5.	2001	Thailand Masters	(Scotland) Stephen Hendry	9–3
Runner-up	7.	2001	Scottish Open	(England) Peter Ebdon	7–9
Runner-up	8.	2001	UK Championship (2)	(England) Ronnie O'Sullivan	1–10
Runner-up	9.	2002	Welsh Open	(England) Paul Hunter	7–9
Runner-up	10.	2002	UK Championship (3)	(Wales) Mark Williams	9–10
Runner-up	11.	2003	World Snooker Championship (2)	(Wales) Mark Williams	16–18
Winner	6.	2006	Malta Cup	(Scotland) John Higgins	9–8

=== Minor-ranking finals: 1 ===
Outcome	No.	Year	Championship	Opponent in the final	Score
Runner-up	1.	1993	Strachan Challenge – Event 3	(Malta) Tony Drago	7–9

=== Non-ranking finals: 29 (17 titles) ===
Legend
Legend
The Masters (0–2)
Premier League (2–1)
Other (15–9)

Outcome	No.	Year	Championship	Opponent in the final	Score
Winner	1.	1991	Benson & Hedges Championship	(Wales) Darren Morgan	9–3
Runner-up	1.	1992	Irish Masters	(Scotland) Stephen Hendry	6–9
Winner	2.	1993	Pontins Professional	(Wales) Darren Morgan	9–3
Winner	3.	1993	Irish Professional Championship	(Republic of Ireland) Stephen Murphy	9–2
Winner	4.	1993	Scottish Masters	(Scotland) Alan McManus	10–9
Winner	5.	1994	Pontins Professional (2)	(England) Nigel Bond	9–5
Winner	6.	1994	Scottish Masters (2)	(Scotland) Stephen Hendry	9–7
Runner-up	2.	1995	European League	(Scotland) Stephen Hendry	2–10
Runner-up	3.	1995	Pontins Professional	(England) Peter Ebdon	8–9
Winner	7.	1996	European League	(England) Steve Davis	10–5
Winner	8.	1996	Pontins Professional (3)	(England) Nigel Bond	9–7
Winner	9.	1997	Malta Grand Prix	(Scotland) John Higgins	7–5
Winner	10.	1998	Irish Masters	(England) Ronnie O'Sullivan	(Note: Having won 9–3, Ronnie O'Sullivan was subsequently stripped of his title and disqualified from the tournament, for failing a drugs test. Doherty was awarded the title.)
Winner	11.	1998	Premier League (2)	(England) Jimmy White	10–2
Runner-up	4.	1998	Malta Grand Prix	(Scotland) Stephen Hendry	6–7
Runner-up	5.	1999	The Masters	(Scotland) John Higgins	8–10
Runner-up	6.	2000	The Masters (2)	(Wales) Matthew Stevens	8–10
Runner-up	7.	2003	Euro-Asia Masters Challenge – Event 1	(Thailand) James Wattana	4–6
Winner	12.	2003	Euro-Asia Masters Challenge – Event 2	(Hong Kong) Marco Fu	5–2
Runner-up	8.	2005	Irish Professional Championship	(Northern Ireland) Joe Swail	7–9
Winner	13.	2006	Irish Professional Championship (2)	(Republic of Ireland) Michael Judge	9–4
Winner	14.	2007	Irish Professional Championship (3)	(Republic of Ireland) Fergal O'Brien	9–2
Winner	15.	2007	Pot Black	(England) Shaun Murphy	1–0
Runner-up	9.	2008	Malta Cup	(England) Shaun Murphy	3–9
Winner	16.	2008	Irish Classic	(Republic of Ireland) Fergal O'Brien	5–2
Runner-up	10.	2008	World Series of Snooker Warsaw	(China) Ding Junhui	4–6
Winner	17.	2009	Pro Challenge Series – Event 2	(England) Martin Gould	6–2
Runner-up	11.	2009	Legends of Snooker	(Scotland) Stephen Hendry	3–5
Runner-up	12.	2011	Irish Classic	(Republic of Ireland) Fergal O'Brien	2–5

=== Seniors finals: 4 (1 title) ===
Outcome	No.	Year	Championship	Opponent in the final	Score
Runner-up	1.	2017	UK Seniors Championship	(England) Jimmy White	2–4
Winner	1.	2018	UK Seniors Championship	(Brazil) Igor Figueiredo	4–1
Runner-up	2.	2020	World Seniors Championship	(England) Jimmy White	4–5
Runner-up	3.	2024	World Seniors Championship (2)	(Brazil) Igor Figueiredo	2–5

=== Team finals: 2 ===
Outcome	No.	Year	Championship	Team	Opponent(s) in the final	Score
Runner-up	1.	1996	World Cup	Ireland	Scotland	7–10
Runner-up	2.	2001	Nations Cup	Ireland	Scotland	2–6

=== Pro-am finals: 14 (7 titles) ===
Outcome	No.	Year	Championship	Opponent in the final	Score
Winner	1.	1988	Pontins Spring Open	(England) Colin Morton	7–5
Runner-up	1.	1989	Pontins Spring Open	(England) Peter Ebdon	4–7
Winner	2.	1996	Pontins Spring Open (2)	(Wales) Darren Morgan	7–3
Winner	3.	1997	Pontins Spring Open (3)	(England) Paul Bunyard	7–6
Winner	4.	2002	Cue Club Pro-Am	(Republic of Ireland) Rodney Goggins	5–2
Winner	5.	2003	Liam O'Connor Memorial	(England) Ian McCulloch	6–2
Winner	6.	2003	Barry McNamee Memorial Trophy	(Northern Ireland) Joe Swail	6–5
Runner-up	2.	2005	Swiss Open	(England) Ricky Walden	3–5
Runner-up	3.	2006	Pontins Pro-Am - Event 1	(England) Jamie Cope	2–4
Winner	7.	2006	Pontins World Series Grand Final	(England) Ricky Walden	4–2
Runner-up	4.	2007	Paul Hunter Classic	(England) Barry Pinches	0–4
Runner-up	5.	2007	Swiss Open	(England) Dave Harold	0–5
Runner-up	6.	2009	Pontins Pro-Am - Event 4	(Wales) Michael White	4–5
Runner-up	7.	2009	Pontins World Series Grand Final	(England) Stuart Bingham	1–3

=== Amateur finals: 7 (6 titles) ===
Outcome	No.	Year	Championship	Opponent in the final	Score
Runner-up	1.	1985	Irish Amateur Championship	(Republic of Ireland) Gay Burns	6–11
Winner	1.	1987	Irish Amateur Championship	(Republic of Ireland) Richard Nolan	8–7
Winner	2.	1987	All-Ireland Amateur Championship	(Northern Ireland) Seamus McClarey	5–3
Winner	3.	1989	Irish Amateur Championship (2)	(Republic of Ireland) Anthony O'Connor	8–5
Winner	4.	1989	World Under-21 Amateur Championship	(England) Jason Ferguson	11–5
Winner	5.	1989	All-Ireland Amateur Championship (2)	(Northern Ireland) Harry Morgan	5–2
Winner	6.	1989	World Amateur Championship	(England) Jonathan Birch	11–2
