= 1993 Pontins Professional =

Tournament information
- Dates: 8–15 May 1993
- Venue: Pontin's
- City: Prestatyn
- Country: Wales
- Organisation: WPBSA
- Format: Non-Ranking event
- Winner's share: £3,500

Final
- Champion: (Republic of Ireland) Ken Doherty
- Runner-up: (Wales) Darren Morgan
- Score: 9–3

The 1993 Pontins Professional was the twentieth edition of the professional invitational snooker tournament which took place between 8 and 15 May 1993 at Pontin's in Prestatyn, Wales.

The tournament featured eight professional players. The quarter-final matches were contested over the best of 9 frames, the semi-final matches over the best of 11 frames, and the final over the best of 17 frames.

Ken Doherty won the event for the first time, beating Darren Morgan 9–3 in the final.

== Main draw ==
Quarter-finals; Best of 9 frames
(Republic of Ireland) Ken Doherty	5
(England) Neal Foulds	1
(England) Mike Hallett	5
(England) Gary Wilkinson	1
(Wales) Darren Morgan	5
(England) Willie Thorne	4
(England) Steve James	5
(England) Tony Knowles	1

Semi-finals; Best of 11 frames
(Republic of Ireland) Ken Doherty	6
(England) Mike Hallett	5
(Wales) Darren Morgan	6
(England) Steve James	4

Final; Best of 17 frames
(Republic of Ireland) Ken Doherty	9
(Wales) Darren Morgan	3
