= 1997 Irish Masters =

Irish Masters
Tournament information
- Dates: 18–23 March 1997
- Venue: Goffs
- City: Kill
- Country: Ireland
- Organisation: WPBSA
- Format: Non-Ranking event
- Winner's share: £72,000
- Highest break: 129

Final
- Champion: (Scotland) Stephen Hendry
- Runner-up: (Wales) Darren Morgan
- Score: 9–8

The 1997 Irish Masters was the twenty-third edition of the professional non-ranking snooker tournament that took place between 6–13 March 1997 at the Goffs in Kill, County Kildare, Ireland.

Stephen Hendry defeated Darren Morgan 9–8 in the final by winning the last two frame at 7–8 down.

== Main draw ==
Round 1 Best of 11 Frames
(England) Ronnie O'Sullivan	6
(England) Nigel Bond	5
(England) Jimmy White	6
(Scotland) Alan McManus	3
(England) Steve Davis	6
(Republic of Ireland) Ken Doherty	1
(England) John Parrott	6
(Republic of Ireland) Stephen Murphy	5

Quarter-finals; Best of 11 Frames
(Scotland) John Higgins	4
(England) Ronnie O'Sullivan	6
(Scotland) Stephen Hendry	6
(England) Jimmy White	5
(England) Peter Ebdon	6
(England) Steve Davis	1
(Wales) Darren Morgan	6
(England) John Parrott	2

Semi-finals; Best of 11 Frames
(England) Ronnie O'Sullivan	2
(Scotland) Stephen Hendry	6
(England) Peter Ebdon	2
(Wales) Darren Morgan	6

Final; Best of 17 Frames
(Scotland) Stephen Hendry	9
(Wales) Darren Morgan	8

== Century breaks ==
- 129 – John Parrott
- 127 – Stephen Hendry
- 121, 118, 101 – Ronnie O'Sullivan
- 100, 100 – Darren Morgan
