= 1993 Scottish Masters =

Scottish Masters
Tournament information
- Dates: 22–26 September 1993
- Venue: Motherwell Civic Centre
- City: Motherwell
- Country: Scotland
- Organisation: WPBSA
- Format: Non-Ranking event
- Total prize fund: £140,000
- Winner's share: £45,000
- Highest break: (England) Nigel Bond (125)

Final
- Champion: (Republic of Ireland) Ken Doherty
- Runner-up: (Scotland) Alan McManus
- Score: 10–9

The 1993 Regal Scottish Masters was the twelfth edition of the professional invitational snooker tournament, which took place from 22 to 26 September 1993. The tournament was played at the Motherwell Civic Centre in Motherwell, and featured twelve professional players.

Ken Doherty won the title for the first time, beating Alan McManus 10–9 in the final.

== Main draw ==
Round 1 Best of 9 frames
(Scotland) Alan McManus	5
(Northern Ireland) Dennis Taylor	2
(England) Steve Davis	3
(England) Nigel Bond	5
(Thailand) James Wattana	4
(Republic of Ireland) Ken Doherty	5
(England) Willie Thorne	5
(Scotland) Billy Snaddon	0

Quarter-finals; Best of 11 frames
(England) Neal Foulds	3
(Scotland) Alan McManus	6
(England) Jimmy White	1
(England) Nigel Bond	6
(England) John Parrott	4
(Republic of Ireland) Ken Doherty	6
(Scotland) Stephen Hendry	3
(England) Willie Thorne	6

Semi-finals; Best of 11 frames
(Scotland) Alan McManus	6
(England) Nigel Bond	4
(Republic of Ireland) Ken Doherty	6
(England) Willie Thorne	3

Final; Best of 19 frames
(Scotland) Alan McManus	9
(Republic of Ireland) Ken Doherty	10

== Final ==
Final: Best of 19 frames. Referee: unknown. Motherwell Civic Centre, Motherwell, Scotland, 26 September 1993.
Ken Doherty; Ireland	10–9	Alan McManus; Scotland
53–65, 85–0 (63), 9–58 (50), 117–0 (73), 47–60, 1–112 (81), 118–0 (118), 85–0 (85), 35–76, 9–82 (53), 74–0 (74), 73–15 (72), 9–82 (58), 63–11, 6–75, 68–1, 65–52, 37–69 (60), 85–43
118	Highest break	81
1	Century breaks	0
6	50+ breaks	5

== Regal Challenge ==
A match, called the Regal Challenge, was held between Ronnie O'Sullivan and John Higgins on 21 September as a curtain-raiser to the main tournament. The match had a winner-takes-all prize of £4,000, O'Sullivan beat Higgins 6–5 after winning the last three frames.
