= 1992 Masters (snooker) =

Professional non-ranking snooker tournament, Feb 1992

1992 Benson & Hedges Masters
Tournament information
- Dates: 2–9 February 1992
- Venue: Wembley Conference Centre
- City: London
- Country: England
- Organisation: WPBSA
- Format: Non-ranking event
- Highest break: Jimmy White (ENG) (139)

Final
- Champion: Stephen Hendry (SCO)
- Runner-up: John Parrott (ENG)
- Score: 9–4

The 1992 Masters (officially the 1992 Benson & Hedges Masters) was a professional non-ranking snooker tournament that took place between 2 and 9 February 1992 at the Wembley Conference Centre in London, England.

Stephen Hendry retained his title by beating John Parrott 9–4 in the final. This was Parrott's last of his three masters finals, he would retire without winning the event.

== Field ==
Defending champion Stephen Hendry was the number 1 seed. Places were allocated to the top 16 players in the world rankings. Players seeded 15 and 16 played in the wild-card round against the winner of the qualifying event, Ken Doherty (ranked 51), and James Wattana (ranked 20), who was the wild-card selection. Ken Doherty and Tony Jones were making their debuts in the Masters.

== Wild-card round ==
In the preliminary round, the wild-card players plays the 15th and 16th seeds:

| Match | Date | | Score | |
|---|---|---|---|---|
| WC1 | Monday 3 February | Tony Jones (ENG) (15) | 4–5 | Ken Doherty (IRL) |
| WC2 | Sunday 2 February | Tony Knowles (ENG) (16) | 1–5 | James Wattana (THA) |

== Main draw ==
Last 16; Best of 9 frames
1 | Stephen Hendry (SCO) | 5
14 | Martin Clark (ENG) | 0
8 | Mike Hallett (ENG) | 3
12 | Dean Reynolds (ENG) | 5
5 | Gary Wilkinson (ENG) | 2
13 | Alain Robidoux (CAN) | 5
4 | Jimmy White (ENG) | 5
10 | Doug Mountjoy (WAL) | 4
3 | Steve Davis (ENG) | 5
9 | Dennis Taylor (NIR) | 4
6 | Neal Foulds (ENG) | 5
11 | Terry Griffiths (WAL) | 3
7 | Steve James (ENG) | 1
James Wattana (THA) | 5
2 | John Parrott (ENG) | 5
Ken Doherty (IRL) | 1

Quarter-finals; Best of 9 frames
1 | (Scotland) Stephen Hendry | 5
12 | (England) Dean Reynolds | 1
13 | (Canada) Alain Robidoux | 3
4 | (England) Jimmy White | 5
3 | (England) Steve Davis | 4
6 | (England) Neal Foulds | 5
(Thailand) James Wattana | 3
2 | (England) John Parrott | 5

Semi-finals; Best of 11 frames
1 | (Scotland) Stephen Hendry | 6
4 | (England) Jimmy White | 4
6 | (England) Neal Foulds | 3
2 | (England) John Parrott | 6

Final; Best of 17 frames
1 | (Scotland) Stephen Hendry | 9
2 | (England) John Parrott | 4

== Final ==
Final: Best of 17 frames. Referee: Alan Chamberlain; Wembley Conference Centre, London, England, 9 February 1992.
| Stephen Hendry; Scotland | 9–4 | John Parrott; England |
First session: 110–0 (81), 56–50, 64–22, 136–0 (136), 58–68, 49–61, 77–32 (67), 64–38, 71–11, 1–119 (81), 6–62, 91–1 (91), 97–0
| 136 | Highest break | 81 |
| 1 | Century breaks | 0 |
| 4 | 50+ breaks | 1 |

== Qualifying ==
Ken Doherty won the qualifying tournament, known as the 1991 Benson & Hedges Championship at the time.

== Century breaks ==
Total: 8

- 139 – Jimmy White
- 136, 118 – Stephen Hendry
- 130, 105 – James Wattana
- 119 – Gary Wilkinson
- 114 – John Parrott
- 101 – Steve Davis

James Wattana's 130 was scored in the wild-card round.
