= 1998 Irish Masters =

Irish Masters
Tournament information
- Dates: 24–29 March 1998
- Venue: Goffs
- City: Kill
- Country: Ireland
- Organisation: WPBSA
- Format: Non-Ranking event
- Total prize fund: £200,000
- Winner's share: £75,000
- Highest break: Ken Doherty (IRL) (129)

Final
- Champion: Ken Doherty (IRL)
- Score: (Note: Ken Doherty was awarded the title after Ronnie O'Sullivan was subsequently stripped of his title and disqualified from the tournament, for failing a drugs test.)

The 1998 Irish Masters was the twenty-fourth edition of the professional invitational snooker tournament, which took place from 24 to 29 March 1998. The tournament was played at Goffs in Kill, County Kildare, and featured twelve professional players.

Ronnie O'Sullivan won the final 9–3 against Ken Doherty, however O'Sullivan failed a post-final drugs test and tested positive for cannabis. He was stripped of the title and disqualified from the tournament with the victory awarded to Doherty.

== Main draw ==
Round 1 Best of 11 frames
(England) Ronnie O'Sullivan | 6
(England) Jimmy White | 2
(England) Steve Davis | 6
(England) Nigel Bond | 5
(Republic of Ireland) Fergal O'Brien | 6
(England) Peter Ebdon | 2
(England) John Parrott | 6
(Malta) Tony Drago | 2

Quarter-finals; Best of 11 frames
(England) Ronnie O'Sullivan | 6
(Scotland) Stephen Hendry | 3
(Scotland) John Higgins | 6
(England) Steve Davis | 3
(Republic of Ireland) Ken Doherty | 6
(Republic of Ireland) Fergal O'Brien | 1
(England) John Parrott | 6
(Wales) Mark Williams | 3

Semi-finals; Best of 11 frames
(England) Ronnie O'Sullivan | 6
(Scotland) John Higgins | 4
(Republic of Ireland) Ken Doherty | 6
(England) John Parrott | 1

Final; Best of 17 frames
(England) Ronnie O'Sullivan | (Disqualified)
(Republic of Ireland) Ken Doherty

* Ronnie O'Sullivan was stripped of the title and disqualified from the tournament after winning 9–3. O'Sullivan failed a drugs test after testing positive for cannabis. Ken Doherty was awarded the title.
