= 1996 European League =

Doc Martens European League
Tournament information
- Dates: 27 December 1995 – 12 May 1996
- Venue: Diamond Centre
- City: Irthlingborough
- Country: England
- Organisation: Matchroom Sport
- Format: Non-ranking event
- Winner's share: £50,000

Final
- Champion: (Republic of Ireland) Ken Doherty
- Runner-up: (England) Steve Davis
- Score: 10–5

The 1996 Doc Martens European League was a professional non-ranking snooker tournament that was played from 27 December 1995 to 12 May 1996. All matches including the play-offs were played at the Diamond Centre at Irthlingborough.

Ken Doherty won in the final 10–5 against Steve Davis.

== League phase ==
Ranking		(England) EBD	(Republic of Ireland) DOH	(Scotland) HEN	(England) DAV	(England) OSU	(England) PAR	(England) WHI	Frame W-L	Match W-D-L	Pld-Pts
1	Peter Ebdon	x	8	3	5	2	5	7	30–18	4–0–2	6–4
2	Ken Doherty	0	x	4	5	5	3	5	22–26	3–1–2	6–3
3	Stephen Hendry	5	4	x	5	3	4	4	25–23	2–3–1	6–2
4	Steve Davis	3	3	3	x	5	4	6	24–24	2–1–3	6–2
5	Ronnie O'Sullivan	6	3	5	3	x	4	3	24–24	2–1–3	6–2
6	John Parrott	3	5	4	4	4	x	4	24–24	1–4–1	6–1
7	Jimmy White	1	3	4	2	5	4	x	19–29	1–2–3	6–1

Top four qualified for the play-offs. If points were level then most frames won determined their positions. If two players had an identical record then the result in their match determined their positions. If that ended 4–4 then the player who got to four first was higher.

- 27 December Match Day 1
  - Peter Ebdon 8–0 Ken Doherty
  - Steve Davis 5–3 Ronnie O'Sullivan
- 28 December Match Day 2
  - Ronnie O'Sullivan 6–2 Peter Ebdon
  - Ken Doherty 5–3 Steve Davis
  - Jimmy White 4–4 John Parrott
- 13 January Match Day 3
  - Ronnie O'Sullivan 5–3 Stephen Hendry
  - Steve Davis 6–2 Jimmy White
- 14 January Match Day 4
  - John Parrott 4–4 Ronnie O'Sullivan
  - Ken Doherty 4–4 Stephen Hendry
  - Peter Ebdon 7–1 Jimmy White
- 20 January Match Day 5
  - Jimmy White 5–3 Ronnie O'Sullivan
  - Stephen Hendry 4–4 John Parrott
- 21 January Match Day 6
  - John Parrott 5–3 Ken Doherty
  - Peter Ebdon 5–3 Steve Davis
  - Jimmy White 4–4 Stephen Hendry
- 13 April Match Day 7
  - Ken Doherty 5–3 Ronnie O'Sullivan
  - Steve Davis 4–4 John Parrott
  - Stephen Hendry 5–3 Peter Ebdon
- 14 April Match Day 8
  - Peter Ebdon 5–3 John Parrott
  - Ken Doherty 5–3 Jimmy White
  - Stephen Hendry 5–3 Steve Davis

== Play-offs ==
11–12 May (Diamond Centre, Irthlingborough, England)

Semi-finals; Best of 11 frames
1	(England) Peter Ebdon	2
4	(England) Steve Davis	6
2	(Republic of Ireland) Ken Doherty	6
3	(Scotland) Stephen Hendry	0

Final; Best of 19 frames
4	(England) Steve Davis	5
2	(Republic of Ireland) Ken Doherty	10
