= 1994 Top Rank Classic =

Top Rank Classic
Tournament information
- Dates: 9–14 September 1994
- Country: Thailand
- Organisation: Top Rank
- Format: Non-ranking event
- Winner's share: £20,000
- Highest break: Alan McManus (SCO), 138

Final
- Champion: Stephen Hendry (SCO)
- Runner-up: Alan McManus (SCO)
- Score: Round-Robin

The 1994 Top Rank Classic was a professional non-ranking snooker tournament that took place between 9 and 14 September 1994. Five players participated and it was won by Stephen Hendry. Hendry received £20,000 in prize money as champion. Alan McManus made the highest break of the tournament, 138, in his match against Hendry.

The decisive match was between Hendry and James Wattana. Hendry won the deciding frame on a respotted black; it was the first professional tournament since the 1975 Masters to be decided on a tie-break black ball.

== Results ==
If points were level then most frames won determined their positions. If two players had an identical record then the result in their match determined their positions.

POS	Player	MP	MW	ML	FW	FL	FD	PTS
Winner	Stephen Hendry (SCO)	4	4	0	25	19	+6	4
Runner-up	Alan McManus (SCO)	4	2	2	24	20	+4	2*
3	James Wattana (THA)	4	2	2	24	20	+4	2
4	Ken Doherty (IRL)	4	2	2	22	22	0	2
5	Darren Morgan (WAL)	4	0	4	15	29	−14	0

* Alan McManus finished as Runner-up on head to head results after beating James Wattana

- Stephen Hendry 6–5 Ken Doherty
- Alan McManus 7–4 James Wattana
- Ken Doherty 6–5 Alan McManus
- James Wattana 8–3 Darren Morgan
- Stephen Hendry 6–5 Alan McManus
- Ken Doherty 7–4 Darren Morgan
- Stephen Hendry 7–4 Darren Morgan
- James Wattana 7–4 Ken Doherty
- Stephen Hendry 6–5 James Wattana
- Alan McManus 7–4 Darren Morgan
