= 1995 Pontins Professional =

Tournament information
- Dates: May 1995
- Venue: Pontin's
- City: Prestatyn
- Country: Wales
- Organisation: WPBSA
- Format: Non-Ranking event

Final
- Champion: (England) Peter Ebdon
- Runner-up: (Republic of Ireland) Ken Doherty
- Score: 9–8

The 1995 Pontins Professional was the twenty-second edition of the professional invitational snooker tournament which took place in May 1995 in Prestatyn, Wales.

The tournament featured eight professional players. The quarter-final matches were contested over the best of 9 frames, the semi-final matches over the best of 11 frames, and the final over the best of 17 frames.

Peter Ebdon won the event for the first time, beating Ken Doherty 9–8 in the final.

== Main draw ==
Quarter-finals; Best of 9 frames
(England) Peter Ebdon	5
(England) Les Dodd	1
(England) Gary Wilkinson	5
(England) Ronnie O'Sullivan	4
(Republic of Ireland) Ken Doherty	5
(England) Neal Foulds	1
(Wales) Darren Morgan	5
(England) Mike Hallett	1

Semi-finals; Best of 11 frames
(England) Peter Ebdon	6
(England) Gary Wilkinson	4
(Republic of Ireland) Ken Doherty	6
(Wales) Darren Morgan	4

Final; Best of 17 frames
(England) Peter Ebdon	9
(Republic of Ireland) Ken Doherty	8
