= 1995 European League =

Doc Martens European League
Tournament information
- Dates: 28 December 1994 – 7 May 1995
- Venue: Diamond Centre
- City: Irthlingborough
- Country: England
- Organisation: Matchroom Sport
- Format: Non-ranking event
- Winner's share: £50,000

Final
- Champion: (Scotland) Stephen Hendry
- Runner-up: (Republic of Ireland) Ken Doherty
- Score: 10–2

The 1995 Doc Martens European League was a professional non-ranking snooker tournament that was played from 28 December 1994 to 7 May 1995. All matches including the play-offs were played at the Diamond Centre at Irthlingborough.

Stephen Hendry won in the final 10–2 against Ken Doherty.

== League phase ==
Ranking		(Scotland) HEN	(England) DAV	(Republic of Ireland) DOH	(England) WHI	(Scotland) MCM	(England) PAR	(England) OSU	Frame W-L	Match W-D-L	Pld-Pts
1	Stephen Hendry	x	6	5	6	4	5	7	33–15	5–1–0	6–5
2	Steve Davis	2	x	4	6	5	5	5	27–21	4–1–1	6–4
3	Ken Doherty	3	4	x	3	3	6	7	26–22	2–1–3	6–2
4	Jimmy White	2	2	5	x	5	3	4	21–27	2–1–3	6–2
5	Alan McManus	4	3	5	3	x	4	3	22–26	1–2–3	6–1
6	John Parrott	3	3	2	5	4	x	4	21–27	1–2–3	6–1
7	Ronnie O'Sullivan	1	3	1	4	5	4	x	18–30	1–2–3	6–1

- 28 December Match Day 1
  - Alan McManus 5–3 Ken Doherty
  - Steve Davis 6–2 Jimmy White
- 29 December Match Day 2
  - Steve Davis 5–3 Alan McManus
  - Ken Doherty 7–1 Ronnie O'Sullivan
  - John Parrott 5–3 Jimmy White
- 21 January Match Day 3
  - Jimmy White 5–3 Ken Doherty
  - Stephen Hendry 4–4 Alan McManus
  - Steve Davis 5–3 Ronnie O'Sullivan
- 22 January Match Day 4
  - John Parrott 4–4 Alan McManus
  - Stephen Hendry 7–1 Ronnie O'Sullivan
- 26 February Match Day 5
  - Ronnie O'Sullivan 4–4 John Parrott
  - Jimmy White 5–3 Alan McManus
  - Stephen Hendry 6–2 Steve Davis
- 27 February Match Day 6
  - Ronnie O'Sullivan 5–3 Alan McManus
  - Stephen Hendry 5–3 Ken Doherty
  - Steve Davis 5–3 John Parrott
- 4 March Match Day 7
  - Stephen Hendry 5–3 John Parrott
  - Ken Doherty 4–4 Steve Davis*
- 5 March Match Day 8
  - Ken Doherty 6–2 John Parrott
  - Stephen Hendry 6–2 Jimmy White
- 6 March Match Day 9
  - Ronnie O'Sullivan 4–4 Jimmy White

== Play-offs ==
6–7 May (Diamond Centre, Irthlingborough, England)

Semi-finals; Best of 11 frames
1	(Scotland) Stephen Hendry	6
4	(England) Jimmy White	1
2	(England) Steve Davis	2
3	(Republic of Ireland) Ken Doherty	6

Final; Best of 19 frames
1	(Scotland) Stephen Hendry	10
3	(Republic of Ireland) Ken Doherty	2
