= 1994 Scottish Masters =

Scottish Masters
Tournament information
- Dates: 20–25 September 1994
- Venue: Motherwell Civic Centre
- City: Motherwell
- Country: Scotland
- Organisation: WPBSA
- Format: Non-ranking event
- Total prize fund: £150,000
- Winner's share: £50,000
- Highest break: (Republic of Ireland) Ken Doherty (137)

Final
- Champion: (Republic of Ireland) Ken Doherty
- Runner-up: (Scotland) Stephen Hendry
- Score: 9–7

The 1994 Regal Scottish Masters was a professional non-ranking snooker tournament that took place between 20 and 25 September 1994 at the Motherwell Civic Centre in Motherwell, Scotland.

Ken Doherty won the tournament by defeating Stephen Hendry 9–7 in the final.

== Prize fund ==
The breakdown of prize money for this year is shown below:

- Winner: £50,000
- Runner-up: £25,000
- Semi-final: £13,500
- Quarter-final: £7,750
- Round 1: £4,250
- Highest break: £5,000
- Total: £150,000

== Main draw ==
Round 1 Best of 9 Frames
(England) Mike Hallett	5
(England) John Parrott	4
(England) Ronnie O'Sullivan	5
(Scotland) Alan McManus	2
(Scotland) Billy Snaddon	5
(Wales) Darren Morgan	3
(England) Jimmy White	5
(Scotland) Drew Henry	1

Quarter-finals; Best of 11 Frames
(Republic of Ireland) Ken Doherty	6
(England) Mike Hallett	4
(Thailand) James Wattana	3
(England) Ronnie O'Sullivan	6
(England) Steve Davis	6
(Scotland) Billy Snaddon	3
(Scotland) Stephen Hendry	6
(England) Jimmy White	3

Semi-finals; Best of 11 Frames
(Republic of Ireland) Ken Doherty	6
(England) Ronnie O'Sullivan	5
(England) Steve Davis	2
(Scotland) Stephen Hendry	6

Final; Best of 17 Frames
(Republic of Ireland) Ken Doherty	9
(Scotland) Stephen Hendry	7

== Century breaks ==
- 137, 111 – Ken Doherty
- 119, 115, 102 – Ronnie O'Sullivan
- 102 – Steve Davis
