= 2001 Nations Cup (snooker) =

Professional snooker tournament

Tournament information
- Dates: 13–21 January 2001
- Venue: The Hexagon
- City: Reading, Berkshire
- Country: England
- Organisation: WPBSA
- Format: Non-ranking team event
- Total prize fund: £69,400
- Winner's share: £16,650 (×3)
- Highest break: Phaitoon Phonbun (131)

Final
- Champion: Scotland: John Higgins; Stephen Hendry; Alan McManus
- Runner-up: Republic of Ireland: Ken Doherty; Fergal O'Brien; Michael Judge
- Score: 6–2

The 2001 Nations Cup (officially the 2001 Coalite Nations Cup) was a professional non-ranking snooker tournament that took place at The Hexagon, in Reading, Berkshire, England, from 13 to 21 January 2001. It was a World Professional Billiards and Snooker Association team competition held as part of the 2000–01 snooker season and the third and final edition of the Nations Cup. The competition was contested by eight nations of three players each, with one of them qualifying via a play-off match. It was sponsored by smokeless coal manufacturer Coalite.

England were the tournament's defending champions but were eliminated in the group stages after finishing third in their group. Scotland's Stephen Hendry, John Higgins and Alan McManus won the competition, defeating the Republic of Ireland's (ROI) Ken Doherty, Fergal O'Brien and Michael Judge six frames to two (6–2) in the final. During the match, referee Alan Chamberlain courted controversy when he cautioned O'Brien over slow play since the television coverage was due to end soon after. The event's highest break was a 131 made by Thai player Phaitoon Phonbun in the second frame of his nation's group match with Malta.

== Background ==
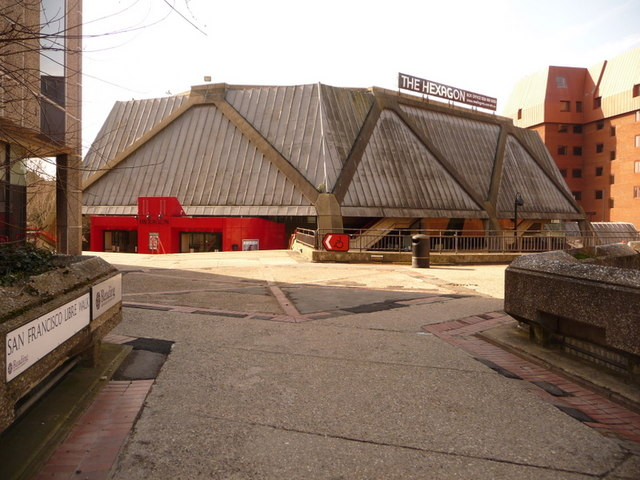
The Hexagon (pictured in 2010), where the tournament was held

The Nations Cup was formed in 1999 as a five-squad snooker tournament involving the Home Nations. The 2001 tournament was expanded from five to eight teams to accommodate non-Home Nations sides. It was a World Professional Billiards and Snooker Association team event staged as part of the 2000–01 snooker season and was held at The Hexagon, Reading, Berkshire, from 13 to 21 January 2001. Although there were plans to rename the tournament the World Cup, this was the final year it was played because ITV stopped broadcasting snooker. Sponsored by smokeless coal manufacturer Coalite, the event had a total prize pool of £69,400, with £46,950 going to the winning squad divided equally amongst all three players. The host broadcaster was ITV.

=== Rules ===
The Nations Cup had eight national teams consisting of three players each. These teams were split into two round-robin groups of four. Each side played a best-of-seven frames match between other nations in their group. The first three frames were contested by one player from each team and the fourth by two from each side. The last frames were played by one participant per nation. The two squads who won the most games in their group qualified for the semi-finals. Should there have been a tie for second place, the nation with the higher frame difference progressed or each player would have two tries to pot the blue ball on its spot from the D in a shoot-out. If this did not determine a group winner, the match would go to sudden death.

The two best-of-nine frames semi-finals were contested on 19 and 20 January with the best-of-eleven frames final on 21 January. The final's first three frames were played by one player from each nation with the fourth featuring two from both teams. The final six frames featured one participant from each squad. In the event the game was tied at 5–5, the team captains would be required to nominate the player for the final frame decider. Except for the last frame of the final, players were not allowed to play two frames in succession or more than one frame against their opposite from the other squad.

=== Prize fund ===
The breakdown of prize money for the 2001 tournament is listed below. Each player received an equal share of prize money for how well their team fared. The £20,000 maximum break prize would be awarded to the first participant to attain the feat in the competition.

- Winner: £16,650
- Runner-up: £6,650
- Highest break: £2,500
- Maximum break: £20,000
- Total: £69,400

=== Participants ===
The tournament composed eight teams of three players representing individual nations. All of the eight nations were represented by their three highest ranked players. Each team was seeded with the defending champions England seeded first and Scotland second. Malta qualified for the Nations Cup by defeating Belgium 3–2 in a play-off round in the Bournemouth International Centre, on 18 November 2000. Below is a list of participating teams and players.

Participants in the 2001 Nations Cup
Country	Seed	Player 1 (Captain)	Player 2	Player 3
England	1	Ronnie O'Sullivan (Note: O'Sullivan later withdrew due to injury and was replaced by Anthony Hamilton. John Parrott took over as England captain.)	Stephen Lee	John Parrott
Scotland	2	John Higgins	Stephen Hendry	Alan McManus
Wales	3	Dominic Dale	Mark Williams	Matthew Stevens
Republic of Ireland	4	Ken Doherty	Fergal O'Brien	Michael Judge
Northern Ireland	5	Joe Swail	Terry Murphy	Gerard Greene
Thailand	6	James Wattana	Phaitoon Phonbun	Noppadon Noppachorn
China	7	Marco Fu	Da Hai Lin	Hasimu Tuerxun
Malta	8	Tony Drago	Joe Grech	Alex Borg

== Group stages ==
=== Group A ===
Group A was played between China, England, Northern Ireland and the Republic of Ireland (ROI) from 13 to 17 January. In the first match, England versus China, Ronnie O'Sullivan won the first frame against Asian qualifier Da Hai Lin and John Parrott the second on a clearance after Marco Fu snookered himself on the last red ball. Stephen Lee beat Hasimu Tuerxun in frame three with breaks of 54 and 79 and Fu and Da won the doubles frame over Lee and O'Sullivan. England won the match 4–1 when O'Sullivan beat Tuerxun. Gerard Greene took a final frame decider for Northern Ireland over the ROI's Michael Judge to win 4–3. O'Sullivan was ruled out for three days with a lower back injury he picked up during a massage at the 2000 China Open and was replaced by Anthony Hamilton.

England's Lee, Parrott and Hamilton and the ROI's Ken Doherty, Fergal O'Brien and Judge shared the first six frames of their match to force a final frame decider won by the latter side with Judge's win over Lee for a 4–3 victory. China defeated Northern Ireland 4–3 in Group A's fourth match. Trailing 2–0 after Fu and Tuerxun lost to Greene and Joe Swail, China took frames three to five before Northern Ireland's Murphy defeated Tuerxun to force a final frame decider. A break of 41 from Hai Lin helped China win 4–3. China came from 3–1 behind the ROI to win the next two frames courtesy of Fu and Hai Lin to end with a final frame decider won by Judge over Tuerxun for a 4–3 victory in 3 hours, 26 minutes and a spot in the semi-finals. Greene, Murphy and Swail helped Northern Ireland defeat England's Lee, Hamilton and Parrott 4–2 to qualify for the semi-finals and eliminate the top seeded team. The final frame was won by Murphy for Northern Ireland after Parrott incurred 67 penalty points in fouls. Parrott admitted post-match: "I was definitely the weakest link .... It's my last time in the event and I certainly haven't covered myself in glory."

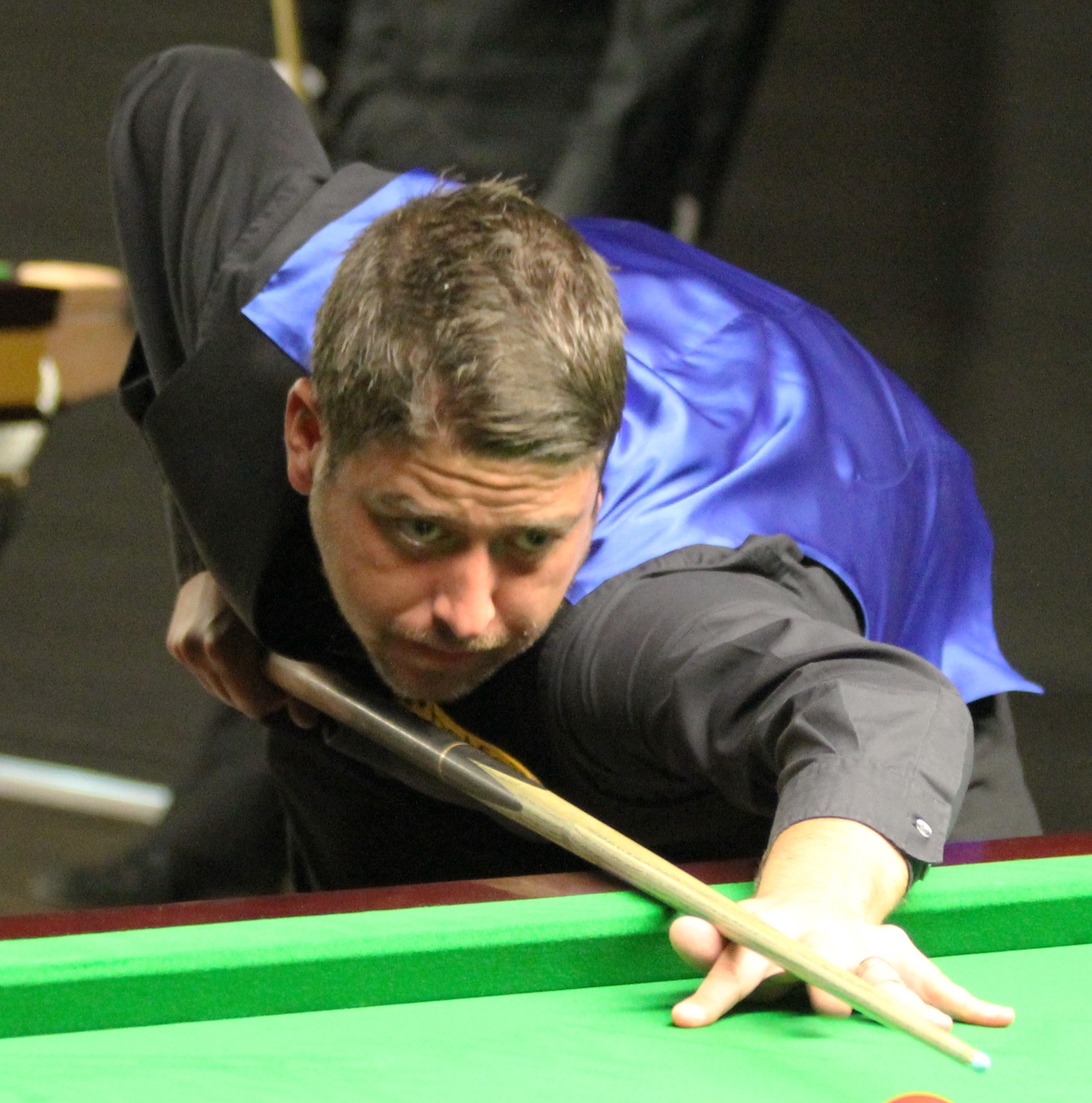
Matthew Stevens (pictured in 2012) achieved an unbeaten record in singles frames during the group stages.

=== Group B ===
Group B was contested by Malta, Scotland, Thailand and Wales between 13 and 18 January. The first match in the group was between Malta and Scotland. Tony Drago made a 47 break to defeat John Higgins before Alan McManus and Stephen Hendry beat Alex Borg and Joe Grech to go 2–1 ahead. Scotland took three of the next four frames to defeat Malta 4–2. Mark Williams and Matthew Stevens of 1999 Nations Cup champions Wales helped to defeat Thailand's James Wattana, Phaitoon Phonbun and Noppadon Noppachorn 4–1 with breaks of 104, 58 and 43 while Dominic Dale lost his singles frame to Phonbun. In Thailand's game with Malta, Phonbun and Wattana beat Drago and Grech respectively including a 131 century break from Phonbun in the second frame before Borg potted the pink ball in frame three to make it 2–1. Thailand took the next three frames to win 4–1.

In Wales' match against Scotland, Dale and Stevens won the first two frames over Higgins and Hendry. McManus beat Williams in frame three but Stevens and Williams restored Wales' two-frame lead by winning the doubles frame over Higgins and McManus. Both nations shared the next two frames but Wales won 4–2 to make the semi-finals. Scotland's Hendry, Higgins and McManus whitewashed the Thai trio of Noppadon, Phonbun and Wattana 4–0 to progress to the semi-finals and Wales' Dale, Stevens and Williams maintained their unbeaten tournament record by 4–0 over Malta's Borg, Drago and Grech for the last spot in the next round. Wales' win also allowed Stevens to maintain his unbeaten form in singles frames.

== Knockout stages ==
=== Semi-finals ===
Both of the best-of-nine frame semi-finals were held between 19 and 20 January. The first-semi final was between the ROI and Wales. Judge won the first frame for Ireland with a 50 break over Williams, and O'Brien the second over Stevens following a one-hour battle in which O'Brien fluked the final red ball into the corner pocket and made a clearance to the pink ball. Dale made a break of 59 to win frame three for Wales before the doubles frame saw Doherty and O'Brien pot the blue, pink and black balls while under pressure from to give the ROI a 3–1 lead. The fifth frame saw Doherty fluke the green ball and pot the brown and blue balls to defeat Stevens and put the ROI 4–1 ahead. The ROI won frame six with O'Brien beating Williams on a fluke on the final red ball and a clearance to the blue ball for a 5–1 victory and the first spot in the final. Losing player Dale said he could not believe the outcome, adding: "In nearly every frame, luck played a part and we didn't have any."

The other semi-final was a 99-minute game between Northern Ireland and Scotland. Hendry made a 71 break against Greene to win the first frame for Scotland and McManus beat Swail by 94 points for the second. Higgins came from 46 points behind Murphy to compile a 60 clearance to the pink and win Scotland's third frame. Greene and Swail led 49–0 in the doubles frame until Hendry partnering McManus made a 68 clearance to claim Scotland's fourth frame. Swail led Higgins 39–0 in frame five before the latter won to finish Scotland's 5–0 whitewash of Northern Ireland and enter the final. Hendry described Scotland's performance as their best since their 1996 World Cup victory in Bangkok, adding: "our opponents can consider themselves unlucky to catch us on such a hot day."

=== Final ===
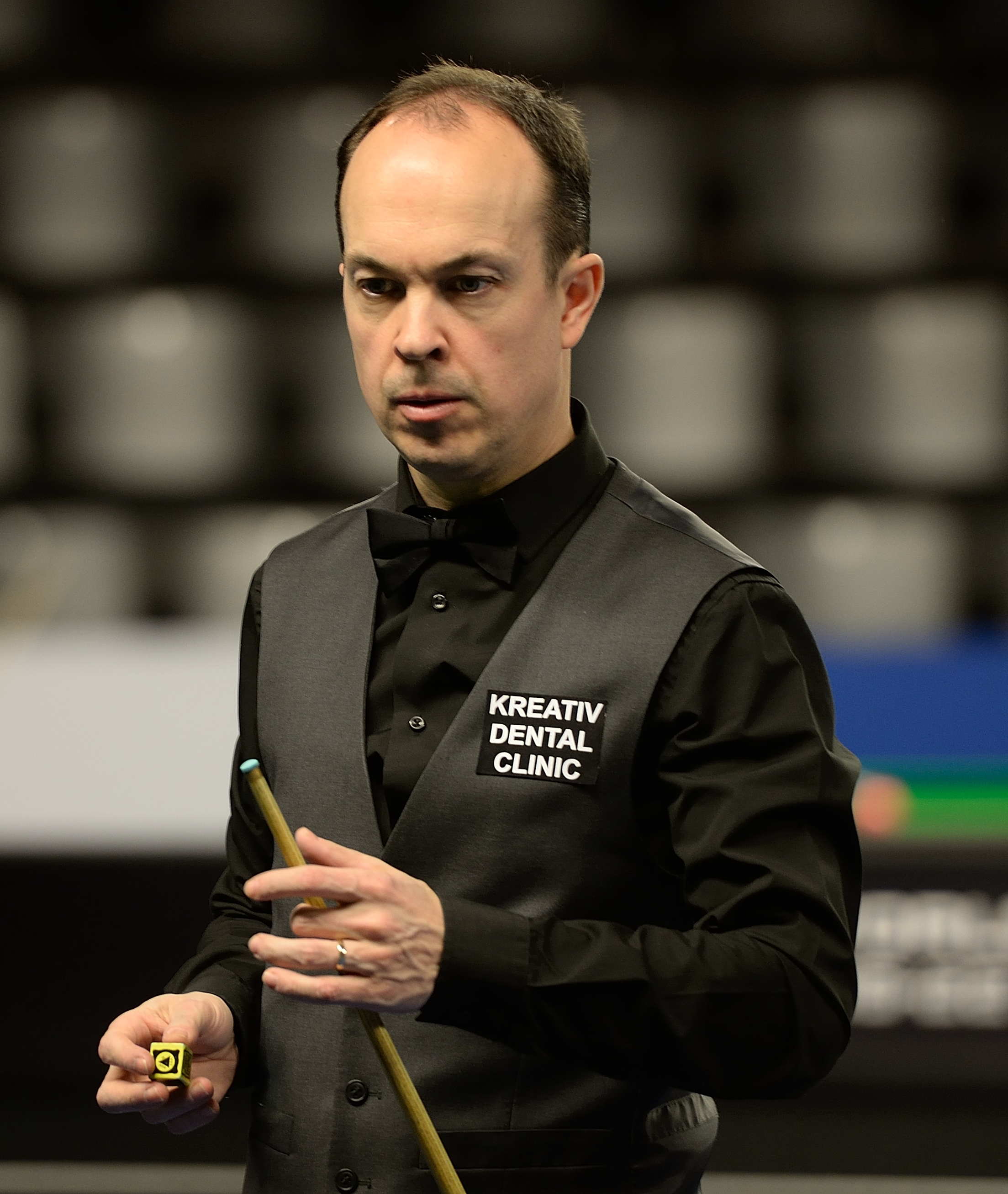
Fergal O'Brien (pictured in 2015) was cautioned by the referee for playing slowly in the sixth frame of the final.

The best-of-eleven frames final between the ROI and Scotland was held in the afternoon of 21 January. Hendry made a break of 92 to defeat Doherty in the first frame and McManus won a 59-minute second frame over O'Brien who missed the green ball during an attempted clearance. Judge made a break of 75 against Higgins to win frame three for the ROI and Doherty and O'Brien made it 2–2 by winning the doubles frame over Hendry and Higgins. McManus fluked the final red ball from a snooker into the left-centre pocket to defeat Doherty in frame five. In frame six, O'Brien was ahead of Higgins when referee Alan Chamberlain cautioned him about playing slowly after taking more than a minute to select a shot. Chamberlain received support from most of the audience for the comment. O'Brien missed a red ball and a snooker to allow Higgins to make a clearance to the black ball and win the frame. Hendry defeated Judge with a break of 87 in the seventh frame and Scotland won the match 6–2 when Higgins beat Doherty with a break of 34 in frame eight. The game lasted 4 hours and 7 minutes.

It was a repeat of Scotland's 1996 World Cup win over the ROI, who became the third nation to claim the Nations Cup. The team won £46,950 prize money shared between all three players. Hendry commented on the victory: "Since losing to Wales in the group we haven't put a foot wrong. As a team we were very solid and I think we deserved to win. People will say that we didn't play England in the semis or Wales in the final but you beat whoever's in the other seat." Higgins added: "'It's been a great week and Stephen's contribution was vital. We've been disappointed in the last two years by our performances but today we responded to the challenge." McManus said: "It was extra special for me because I have not won a tournament for a while. And it's great to play alongside a couple of legends like Stephen and John. We are all very patriotic and we're delighted to win for Scotland."

Of the warning about slow play. O'Brien said Chamberlain told him to finish because ITV's coverage of the match would end at 17:00 local time. He added: "If he had used some tact and maybe waited until the end of the frame it would have been different. But to do it in front of the crowd and TV was tactless, especially as I was fighting for myself and my team out there." Doherty called Chamberlain's selection of words "an absolute disgrace" and said he would write a complaint. Hendry said he thought the incident with O'Brien "unfortunate, to say the least, and unfair", adding: "He isn't a slow player, he flows as much as anyone when he's among the balls." Steve Davis, the six-time world champion, defended Chamberlain's choice, believing there was a straightforward shot based on position of the balls and that O'Brien spent too long examining the situation. A spokesperson for production company ISN commented: "We feel it is important to make it plain that there was no communication or attempted communication between ourselves and any of the match officials."

Chamberlain was deemed by the WPBSA to have applied the rule correctly but ruled his comment not appropriate. He accepted that he did not say the right words and he was reassigned away from the next match involving O'Brien at the first round of the 2001 Masters.

== Main draw ==
The teams highlighted in bold text in the table indicate who progressed to the semi-finals. Teams in bold to the right of the tables denote match winners.

=== Group A ===
Group A final table
POS	SE	Team	MP	MW	ML	FF	FA	FD
1	5	**Northern Ireland**	3	2	1	11	9	+2
2	4	**Ireland**	3	2	1	11	10	+1
3	1	England	3	1	2	9	9	0
4	7	China	3	1	2	8	11	-3

- **England** **4**–1 China
- Ireland 3–**4** **Northern Ireland**
- England 3–**4** **Ireland**
- Northern Ireland 3–**4** **China**
- **Ireland** **4**–3 China
- England 2–**4** **Northern Ireland**

=== Group B ===
Group B final table
POS	SE	Team	MP	MW	ML	FF	FA	FD
1	3	**Wales**	3	3	0	12	3	+9
2	2	**Scotland**	3	2	1	10	6	+4
3	6	Thailand	3	1	2	5	9	-4
4	8	Malta	3	0	3	3	12	-9

- **Scotland** **4**–2 Malta
- **Wales** **4**–1 Thailand
- **Thailand** **4**–1 Malta
- **Wales** **4**–2 Scotland
- **Scotland** **4**–0 Thailand
- **Wales** **4**–0 Malta

=== Knockout stages ===
Numbers to the left of the nations are the tournament seedings. Sides in bold indicate match winners.

Semi-finals; Best of 9 frames
3	Wales	1
4	**Ireland**	5
2	**Scotland**	5
5	Northern Ireland	0

Final; Best of 11 frames
2	**Scotland**	6
4	Ireland	2

=== Final ===
Match winning players and scores are shown in bold. Breaks over 50 are shown in brackets.

Final: Best of 11 frames. Referee: Alan Chamberlain. The Hexagon, Reading, Berkshire, England, 21 January 2001.
**Stephen Hendry**; **Alan McManus**; **John Higgins**; **Scotland** **(2)**	**6**–2	Ken Doherty; Fergal O'Brien; Michael Judge; Ireland (4)
**Hendry** v Doherty: **105**–17 (92); **McManus** v O'Brien: **81**–56; Higgins v Judge: 16–**85** (75); Hendry/Higgins v Doherty/O'Brien: 37–**73**; **McManus** v Doherty: **44**–11; **Higgins** v O'Brien: **58**–47; **Hendry** v Judge: **87**–0 (87); **Higgins** v Doherty: **67**–26
