= Michael Holt (snooker player) =

English snooker player (born 1978)

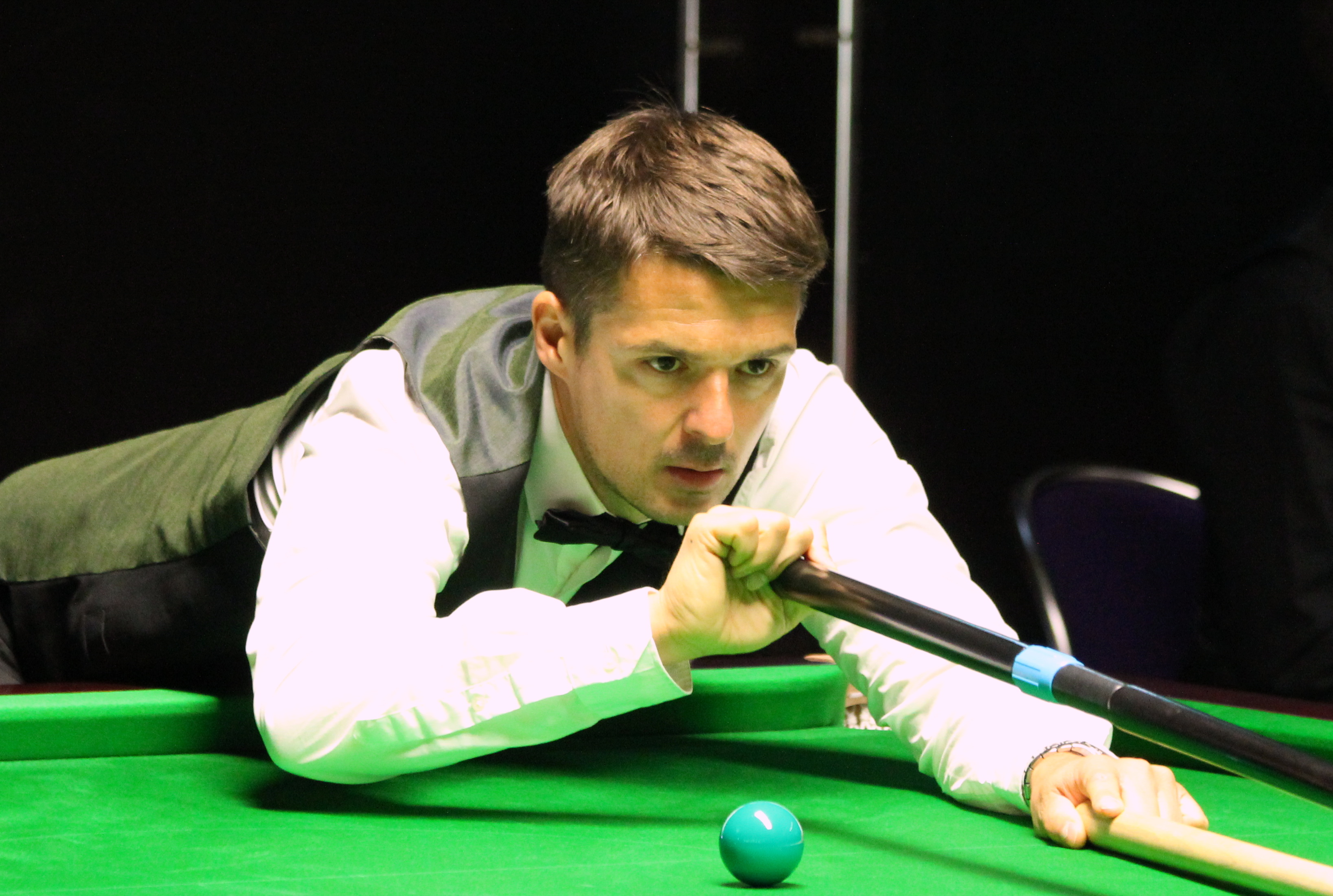
- Holt at the 2016 Paul Hunter Classic

Personal information
- Nickname: The Hitman
- Born: 7 August 1978 (age 48) Nottingham, England

Sport
- Country: England
- Sport: Snooker
- Professional: 1996/1997, 1998–2022, 2024–present
- Highest ranking: 20 (September 2013 – March 2014)
- Current ranking: 40 (as of 7 November 2026)
- Maximum breaks: 1
- Century breaks: 257 (as of 19 November 2026)

Tournament wins
- Ranking: 1
- Minor-ranking: 2

Michael Holt (born 7 August 1978) is an English professional snooker player from Nottingham. A former world Top 20 player, he has won one ranking event — the 2020 Snooker Shoot Out — and two minor-ranking tournaments. He was runner-up at two ranking events — the 2016 Riga Masters and the 2019 Snooker Shoot Out. Holt also reached the semi-finals of the 2013 Shanghai Masters as well as five other quarter-finals.

== Career ==
=== 2001–2010 ===
Holt lost in the final qualifying round of the World Snooker Championship in 2001 and 2002. Holt almost qualified for the 2004 event – he was 9–5 ahead in his final qualifying match against Anthony Hamilton, before losing the next five frames to lose the match.

In the 2005 World Snooker Championship, he beat his friend Paul Hunter in the first round. In the second round he faced Steve Davis, losing 10–13 after having led 8–2. For the 2005 tournament he used eBay to auction the sponsorship space on his waistcoat to Cabaret, a Nottingham nightspot.

He qualified for the 2006 World Championship, and lost in the first round to eventual runner-up Peter Ebdon 10–8, earning Ebdon's applause as a result of his performance. He won the non-ranking German Open in 2006, and reached the final in 2005. His 5–3 victory over Ronnie O'Sullivan in the 2007 Malta Cup was his first in five attempts against O'Sullivan. He then lost to Mark King in the last 16 there. He lost to eventual champion John Higgins in the first round in 2007. The rest of 2007 was unspectacular, barring victory in the minor Dutch Open, which featured seven of the top 32 of the time, including wins over Nigel Bond and Barry Pinches. He missed out on the 2008 World Championship after losing to Michael Judge, causing him to drop out of the top 32 after four seasons there, after a season in which he failed to reach the last 16 of a ranking event.

Holt's results improved in 2008–09. He reached the last 16 of the 2008 Grand Prix, defeating Jimmy White and Michael Judge to qualify and scored a 5–1 defeat of Mark Allen at the venue, before losing 2–5 to Ding Junhui. In the subsequent Bahrain Championship Holt scored a 5–0 victory over David Morris in which his Irish opponent scored just 10 points, the lowest total in a best-of-nine world ranking match since 1992. He then beat Jamie Cope to reach the last sixteen and commented that he was in the best form of his career. He then lost 4–5 to Robert Milkins in the last 16, having led 3–0. He defeated Mark Davis and Dominic Dale to reach the 2009 World Championship, guaranteeing his return to the top 32. He summarised the change in his game by commenting "This year, people have had to beat me. I haven't given matches away."

Holt qualified for three of the six ranking tournaments in the 2009–10 season, but lost in the first round in each.

=== 2010–11 season ===
The 2010–11 season saw the introduction of Players Tour Championship (PTC) events. At the Prague Classic, Holt won six matches to reach the first final of the career which included victories over Stephen Maguire, Mark Selby and Shaun Murphy. He faced John Higgins who he had failed to beat in 13 previous meetings, but produced a superb performance to win 4–2. Holt dedicated the title to his father who had suffered a stroke two months previously. The result ensured he would qualify for the PTC Finals as he finished 13th on the Order of Merit and he saw off Marco Fu 4–1 and Barry Pinches 4–3 to match his best result in a full ranking event. In the quarter-finals he lost 4–2 against Martin Gould. Despite his surge in form late in the season, he ended it ranked world number 45, the lowest he had been in ten years.

=== 2011–12 season ===
Holt reached the second round of ranking events three times during the 2011–12 season, but lost on each occasion. He saved his best performances for the minor-ranking PTC events for the second season in a row most notably at the 10th event where he won the title by beating Dominic Dale 4–2 in the final. Holt said afterwards that the shorter matches suit him as there is not enough time for him to lose his head and stated that if he could maintain a consistent temperament he could achieve more success in the game. He was also a losing quarter-finalist in three other events to finish fourth on the Order of Merit and qualify for the Finals again where he was beaten 4–1 by Stephen Lee.

=== 2012–13 season ===
Holt qualified for four of the first six ranking events in the 2012–13 season, but could not advance beyond the first round in any of them. At the German Masters he beat Mark Williams 5–1 and Kurt Maflin 5–3 to reach the quarter-finals where he lost 5–2 to Ali Carter.

=== 2013–14 season ===
At the 2013 Shanghai Masters, Holt reached the semi-finals of a ranking event for the first time in his 17-year career. He began the event by outplaying Judd Trump in a 5–1 win with breaks of 115 and 97. His second round match against Martin Gould went to the colours in the deciding frame with Gould missing the final blue, before Holt potted the blue and pink to triumph 5–4. He then swept past world number 100 Kyren Wilson 5–1 to face home favourite Xiao Guodong in the semi-finals. Holt was beaten 6–3 by Xiao in a high-quality encounter. His form continued into the following week's Zhangjiagang Open by winning six games to reach his third minor-ranking final where he lost 4–1 to Ju Reti. At the German Masters, Holt played Trump in the quarter-finals, with Trump exacting some revenge from his defeat earlier in the season by whitewashing Holt 5–0. Holt qualified for the World Championship, losing 10–4 to Mark Allen in the first round, but his successful season saw him finish it as the world number 22, the highest he had been in eight years.

=== 2014–15 season ===
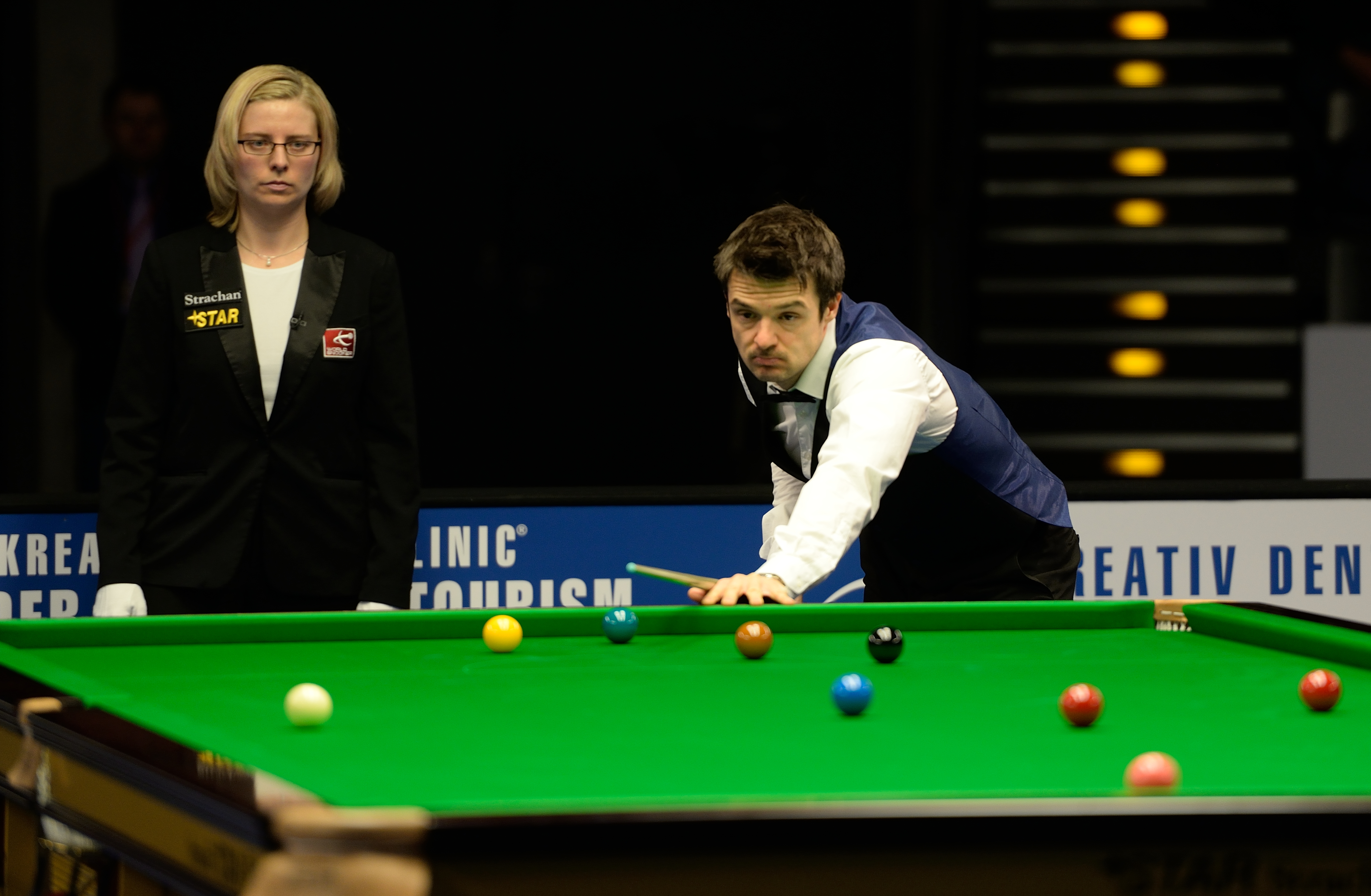
Holt at the 2015 German Masters

Holt began the 2014–15 season by advancing to the final of the Yixing Open, but he was beaten 4–2 by Ding Junhui. He eliminated Rory McLeod and Sam Baird at the Wuxi Classic, before losing 5–1 to Neil Robertson in the last 16. A second last 16 ranking event appearance followed at the Shanghai Masters after Holt overcame Ricky Walden 5–2, but he was ousted by reigning world champion Mark Selby 5–2. Holt made a 138 break during his 6–1 victory over Zak Surety in the opening round of the UK Championship, before losing 6–3 to Dechawat Poomjaeng. He lost his first six ranking matches in 2015, but qualified for the PTC Grand Final by finishing sixth on the Asian Order of Merit. There, Holt defeated Jimmy Robertson 4–2 and held on against Stephen Maguire to win 4–3 having been 3–0 up. In his only quarter-final in a ranking event this season, Holt was knocked out 4–1 by Joe Perry.

=== 2015–16 season ===
The 2015–16 season was a solid but unspectacular year for Holt as he qualified for every ranking event he entered, but was unable to make a single quarter-final appearance. However, he did have a number of significant wins during the campaign. He reached the semi-finals of the minor-ranking Paul Hunter Classic by beating Judd Trump 4–1, but lost 4–2 to Ali Carter. Holt played Ronnie O'Sullivan in the opening round of the World Grand Prix and he made breaks of 88 and 119 in going 3–0 up. O'Sullivan responded to make it 3–3, before a 76 from Holt saw him advance to the second round, where he was knocked out 4–2 by Liang Wenbo. In the first round of the World Championship he scored his first win at the Crucible for 11 years by beating 2010 winner Neil Robertson 10–6. In the second round Holt lost 13–8 to Mark Williams, but hoped the defeat would be a turning point in his career and that next year he would arrive at the tournament as a ranking event winner.

=== 2016–17 season ===
Holt almost delivered on this statement straight away as he reached the final of the Riga Masters, the first ranking event of the 2016–17 season. He got past reigning world champion Mark Selby 4–1 and then beat Ian Burns and Stuart Bingham both 4–3 and Anthony McGill 4–0. His semi-final with Mark Williams was decided on the final brown in a deciding frame. In his first ranking event final, he took a slender 2–1 lead over Neil Robertson, but was defeated 2–5. Holt beat Ronnie O'Sullivan for the second time in a row when he knocked him out 5–2 in the second round of the Shanghai Masters. Another win over O'Sullivan came in the third round of the International Championship, before narrowly losing 5–6 to Stuart Bingham in the quarter-finals. Holt lost in the second round of the UK Championship, German Masters and China Open. He was one win away from qualifying for the World Championship when his tie with Peter Ebdon went to a final-frame decider. Holt went in-off on the final blue and Ebdon potted the final three balls to win 10–9.

=== 2019–20 season ===
In February 2020, Holt won the Snooker Shoot Out for his first ranking tournament win.

== Personal life ==
Holt stated during the 2016 World Championship that he regrets leaving school early. He got married in June 2017 and now has a son, born in March 2018. Holt supports his local football club Nottingham Forest. Holt has said that he finds it difficult to re-focus after playing a poor shot, leading to dips in form that may last for two to three frames.

== Performance and rankings timeline ==
Tournament	1996/ 97	1997/ 98	1998/ 99	1999/ 00	2000/ 01	2001/ 02	2002/ 03	2003/ 04	2004/ 05	2005/ 06	2006/ 07	2007/ 08	2008/ 09	2009/ 10	2010/ 11	2011/ 12	2012/ 13	2013/ 14	2014/ 15	2015/ 16	2016/ 17	2017/ 18	2018/ 19	2019/ 20	2020/ 21	2021/ 22	2022/ 23	2023/ 24	2024/ 25	2025/ 26	2026/ 27
Ranking (Note: It shows the ranking at the beginning of the season)	(Note: New players on the Main Tour don't have a ranking)	(Note: He was an amateur)		74	62	45	35	39	29	24	21	24	34	24	24	45	33	26	22	25	29	23	31	44	30	31				66	51
Ranking tournaments
Championship League	Tournament Not Held											Non-Ranking Event													RR	RR	RR	2R	RR	RR	RR
China Open (Note: The event was called the China International (1997/1998–1998/1999))	NH	NR	1R	LQ	1R	LQ	Not Held		1R	2R	1R	LQ	WR	LQ	LQ	WR	1R	1R	LQ	2R	2R	2R	2R	Tournament Not Held							LQ
Wuhan Open	Tournament Not Held																											A	LQ	1R	1R
British Open	LQ	A	3R	LQ	1R	LQ	LQ	2R	3R	Tournament Not Held																1R	A	A	1R	LQ	2R
English Open	Tournament Not Held																				1R	1R	1R	3R	3R	LQ	A	A	1R	1R	1R
Shenzhen Open (Note: The event was called the Xi'an Grand Prix (2024/2025–2025/2026))	Tournament Not Held																												LQ	1R	QF
Northern Ireland Open	Tournament Not Held																				2R	3R	3R	2R	4R	LQ	A	A	LQ	LQ	
International Championship	Tournament Not Held																LQ	LQ	LQ	2R	QF	1R	2R	1R	Not Held			A	1R	1R	LQ
UK Championship	LQ	A	3R	QF	LQ	1R	LQ	1R	1R	2R	1R	1R	1R	1R	LQ	LQ	1R	3R	2R	3R	2R	2R	2R	2R	2R	2R	A	LQ	QF	1R	
Shoot Out	Tournament Not Held														Non-Ranking Event						2R	2R	F	W	2R	3R	QF	A	1R	2R	
Scottish Open (Note: The event was called the International Open (1996/1997) and the Players Championship (2003/2004))	LQ	A	LQ	LQ	LQ	LQ	2R	1R	Tournament Not Held								MR	Not Held			2R	3R	2R	1R	3R	WD	A	A	LQ	1R	LQ
German Masters (Note: The event was called the German Open (1996/1997–1997/1998))	LQ	A	NR	Tournament Not Held											LQ	LQ	QF	QF	1R	2R	2R	LQ	LQ	LQ	LQ	LQ	A	A	LQ	LQ	LQ
Welsh Open	LQ	A	LQ	LQ	1R	LQ	2R	2R	1R	2R	2R	2R	LQ	LQ	1R	1R	LQ	3R	1R	2R	1R	2R	1R	1R	1R	1R	LQ	A	1R	1R	
World Grand Prix	Tournament Not Held																		NR	2R	1R	DNQ	DNQ	1R	1R	DNQ	DNQ	DNQ	DNQ	DNQ	
Players Championship (Note: The event was called the Players Tour Championship Grand Final (2010/2011–2015/2016))	Tournament Not Held														QF	2R	DNQ	1R	QF	1R	DNQ	DNQ	DNQ	1R	DNQ	DNQ	DNQ	DNQ	DNQ	DNQ	
World Open (Note: The event was called the Grand Prix (1996/1997–2000/2001 and 2004/2005–2009/2010) and the LG Cup (2001/2002–2003/2004))	LQ	A	LQ	LQ	LQ	1R	3R	QF	1R	QF	RR	RR	2R	LQ	LQ	2R	1R	2R	Not Held		2R	2R	2R	QF	Not Held			A	3R	2R	
Tour Championship	Tournament Not Held																						DNQ	DNQ	DNQ	DNQ	DNQ	DNQ	DNQ	DNQ	
World Championship	LQ	LQ	LQ	LQ	LQ	LQ	LQ	LQ	2R	1R	1R	LQ	1R	1R	LQ	LQ	1R	1R	LQ	2R	LQ	LQ	LQ	LQ	LQ	LQ	LQ	LQ	LQ	LQ	
Non-ranking tournaments
Champion of Champions	Tournament Not Held																	A	A	A	A	A	A	A	1R	A	A	A	A	A	
The Masters	LQ	LQ	LQ	LQ	LQ	LQ	LQ	LQ	A	LQ	LQ	LQ	LQ	LQ	A	A	A	A	A	A	A	A	A	A	A	A	A	A	A	A	
Championship League	Tournament Not Held											RR	A	RR	A	A	A	RR	RR	RR	RR	RR	A	RR	RR	A	A	A	A	A	
Former ranking tournaments
Asian Classic	LQ	Tournament Not Held																													
Malta Grand Prix	Non-Ranking			1R	NR	Tournament Not Held																									
Thailand Masters (Note: The event was called the Thailand Open (1996/1997))	LQ	A	LQ	LQ	1R	1R	NR	Not Held			NR	Tournament Not Held																			
Irish Masters	Non-Ranking Event						LQ	1R	LQ	NH	NR	Tournament Not Held																			
Northern Ireland Trophy	Tournament Not Held									NR	1R	1R	2R	Tournament Not Held																	
Bahrain Championship	Tournament Not Held												2R	Tournament Not Held																	
Wuxi Classic (Note: The event was called the Jiangsu Classic (2008/2009–2009/2010))	Tournament Not Held												Non-Ranking Event				WR	LQ	3R	Tournament Not Held											
Australian Goldfields Open	Tournament Not Held															LQ	1R	1R	1R	2R	Tournament Not Held										
Shanghai Masters	Tournament Not Held											1R	LQ	1R	LQ	2R	LQ	SF	2R	2R	QF	1R	Non-Ranking		Not Held			Non-Ranking Event			
Paul Hunter Classic (Note: The event was called the Grand Prix Fürth (2004/2005) and the Fürth German Open (2005/2006–2006/2007))	Tournament Not Held								Pro-am Event						Minor-Ranking Event						3R	1R	A	NR	Tournament Not Held						
Indian Open	Tournament Not Held																	2R	LQ	NH	LQ	3R	1R	Tournament Not Held							
Riga Masters (Note: The event was called the Riga Open (2014/2015–2015/2016))	Tournament Not Held																		Minor-Rank		F	LQ	2R	2R	Tournament Not Held						
China Championship	Tournament Not Held																				NR	1R	LQ	1R	Tournament Not Held						
WST Pro Series	Tournament Not Held																								RR	Tournament Not Held					
Turkish Masters	Tournament Not Held																									2R	Tournament Not Held				
Gibraltar Open	Tournament Not Held																			MR	2R	WD	1R	3R	A	1R	Tournament Not Held				
WST Classic	Tournament Not Held																										1R	Tournament Not Held			
European Masters (Note: The event was called the European Open (1996/1997, 2001/2002–2003/2004), the Irish Open (1998/1999) and the Malta Cup (2004/2005–2007/2008))	LQ	NH	LQ	Not Held		LQ	1R	LQ	1R	LQ	2R	NR	Tournament Not Held								1R	1R	LQ	2R	3R	LQ	LQ	A	Not Held		
Saudi Arabia Masters	Tournament Not Held																												2R	2R	NH
Former non-ranking tournaments
World Grand Prix	Tournament Not Held																		1R	Ranking Event											
General Cup (Note: The event was called the General Cup International (2004/2005–2011/2012))	Tournament Not Held								A	Tournament Not Held				A	NH	A	A	A	A	RR	Tournament Not Held										
Shoot Out	Tournament Not Held														1R	1R	SF	2R	QF	1R	Ranking Event										
China Championship	Tournament Not Held																				QF	Ranking Event									
Paul Hunter Classic	Tournament Not Held								Pro-am Event						Minor-Ranking Event						Ranking Event			1R	Tournament Not Held						
Six-red World Championship (Note: The event was called the Six-red Snooker International (2008/2009) and the Six-red World Grand Prix (2009/2010))	Tournament Not Held												SF	3R	QF	NH	A	A	2R	2R	QF	QF	RR	A	Not Held		A	Tournament Not Held			
Haining Open	Tournament Not Held																		MR		A	A	3R	3R	NH	A	A	Tournament Not Held			

Performance Table Legend
LQ	lost in the qualifying draw	#R	lost in the early rounds of the tournament (WR = Wildcard round, RR = Round robin)	QF	lost in the quarter-finals
SF	lost in the semi–finals	F	lost in the final	W	won the tournament
DNQ	did not qualify for the tournament	A	did not participate in the tournament	WD	withdrew from the tournament

NH / Not Held	means an event was not held.
NR / Non-Ranking Event	means an event is/was no longer a ranking event.
R / Ranking Event	means an event is/was a ranking event.
MR / Minor-Ranking Event	means an event is/was a minor-ranking event.
PA / Pro-am Event	means an event is/was a pro-am event.

== Career finals ==
=== Ranking finals: 3 (1 title) ===
Outcome	No.	Year	Championship	Opponent in the final	Score
Runner-up	1.	2016	Riga Masters	(Australia) Neil Robertson	2–5
Runner-up	2.	2019	Snooker Shoot Out	(Thailand) Thepchaiya Un-Nooh	0–1
Winner	1.	2020	Snooker Shoot Out	(China) Zhou Yuelong	1–0

=== Minor-ranking finals: 4 (2 titles) ===
Outcome	No.	Year	Championship	Opponent in the final	Score
Winner	1.	2010	Prague Classic	(Scotland) John Higgins	4–3
Winner	2.	2011	Players Tour Championship – Event 10	(Wales) Dominic Dale	4–2
Runner-up	1.	2013	Zhangjiagang Open	(China) Ju Reti	1–4
Runner-up	2.	2014	Yixing Open	(China) Ding Junhui	2–4

=== Non-ranking finals: 3 (1 title) ===
Outcome	No.	Year	Championship	Opponent in the final	Score
Runner-up	1.	1997	UK Tour – Event 1	(Scotland) Paul McPhillips	5–6
Winner	1.	2000	Merseyside Professional Championship	(England) Rod Lawler	5–3
Runner-up	2.	2010	Pro Challenge Series – Event 5	(England) Barry Hawkins	5–6

=== Pro-am finals: 8 (3 titles) ===
Outcome	No.	Year	Championship	Opponent in the final	Score
Runner-up	1.	2005	Fürth German Open	(England) Mark King	2–4
Runner-up	2.	2005	Dutch Open	(Belgium) Bjorn Haneveer	1–6
Runner-up	3.	2006	Pontins Pro-Am - Event 3	(England) Judd Trump	1–4
Winner	1.	2006	Fürth German Open	(England) Barry Hawkins	4–2
Winner	2.	2007	Dutch Open	(England) Barry Pinches	6–4
Winner	3.	2010	Pink Ribbon	(England) Jimmy White	6–5
Runner-up	4.	2010	Pontins Autumn Open	(England) Rob James	4–5
Runner-up	5.	2011	Pink Ribbon	(England) Mark Joyce	0–4

=== Team finals: 3 (3 titles) ===
Outcome	No.	Year	Championship	Team/partner	Opponent(s) in the final	Score
Winner	1.	2009	World Mixed Doubles Championship	(England) Reanne Evans	(England) Joe Perry (England) Leah Willett	3–2
Winner	2.	2015	World Mixed Doubles Championship (2)	(England) Reanne Evans	(England) Hammad Miah (England) Maria Catalano	4–1
Winner	3.	2017	CVB Snooker Challenge	Great Britain	China	26–9

=== Amateur finals: 5 (4 titles) ===
Outcome	No.	Year	Championship	Opponent in the final	Score
Winner	1.	1996	UK Under-19 Championship	(Scotland) Stephen Maguire	4–1
Runner-up	1.	1997	EBSA European Under-19 Snooker Championships	(Republic of Ireland) Thomas Dowling	3–6
Winner	2.	2023	Q Tour – Event 2	(Wales) Liam Davies	5–2
Winner	3.	2023	Q Tour – Event 5	(England) Daniel Womersley	5–1
Winner	4.	2024	Q Tour – Event 6	(Wales) Alfie Davies	5–4
