= Nations Cup (snooker) =

Tournament information
- Venue: The Hexagon
- Location: Reading
- Country: England
- Established: 1999
- Organisation(s): World Professional Billiards and Snooker Association
- Format: Non-ranking team event
- Final year: 2001
- Final champion: Scotland; Stephen Hendry; John Higgins; Alan McManus

The Nations Cup was a non-ranking team snooker tournament created in 1999, and the second team tournament after the World Cup. The annual contests featured team of four players representing their country against other such teams.

== History ==
The event began in the 1998/1999 season. It was held at the Telewest Arena, Newcastle upon Tyne. The five home countries participated, who were represented by four player teams and were identified by coloured waistcoats. It was played on a round robin basis with the top two meeting in the final. For the final two years the event moved to the Hexagon Theatre in Reading. In 2001 there were eight teams, as Thailand, Malta and China joined the competition. Teams consisted of three players and were split into two round robin groups, from where the top two teams advanced to the semi-finals. It was planned to rename the event to World Cup in 2002, but it was abandoned because ITV discontinued their snooker coverage.

== Winners ==
Year	Winners		Runners-up		Final score	Host city	Season
Year	Team	Player	Team	Player	Final score	Host city	Season
1999	Wales	Darren Morgan; Mark Williams; Matthew Stevens; Dominic Dale	Scotland	Stephen Hendry; John Higgins; Alan McManus; Chris Small	6–4	Newcastle upon Tyne	1998/99
2000	England	John Parrott; Ronnie O'Sullivan; Stephen Lee; Jimmy White	Wales	Darren Morgan; Mark Williams; Matthew Stevens; Dominic Dale	6–4	Reading	1999/00
2001	Scotland	Stephen Hendry; John Higgins; Alan McManus	Republic of Ireland	Ken Doherty; Fergal O'Brien; Michael Judge	6–2	Reading	2000/01

== See also ==
- World Cup (snooker)
