= 2000 Nations Cup (snooker) =

Tournament information
- Dates: 15–23 January 2000
- Venue: Telewest Arena
- City: Newcastle upon Tyne
- Country: England
- Organisation: WPBSA
- Format: Non-ranking event
- Highest break: John Higgins (147)

Final
- Champion: England: Ronnie O'Sullivan; John Parrott; Stephen Lee; Jimmy White
- Runner-up: Wales: Darren Morgan; Mark Williams; Matthew Stevens; Dominic Dale
- Score: 6–4

The 2000 Nations Cup was a professional non-ranking snooker team tournament that took place at Telewest Arena in Newcastle upon Tyne, England, from 15 to 23 January 2000. It was the second edition of the Nations Cup. The competition was contested by five nations of four players each. The England team of Ronnie O'Sullivan, John Parrott, Stephen Lee and Jimmy White won the title with a 6–4 victory in the final over the Wales Team of Darren Morgan, Mark Williams, Matthew Stevens and Dominic Dale.

John Higgins compiled the 35th official maximum break in his round-robin match against Dennis Taylor.

== Participants ==
Below is a list of participating teams and players.

Country	Player 1	Player 2	Player 3	Player 4
England	Ronnie O'Sullivan	John Parrott	Stephen Lee	Jimmy White
Northern Ireland	Joe Swail	Terry Murphy	Gerard Greene	Dennis Taylor
Republic of Ireland	Ken Doherty	Fergal O'Brien	Michael Judge	Stephen O'Connor
Scotland	Stephen Hendry	John Higgins	Alan McManus	Chris Small
Wales	Darren Morgan	Dominic Dale	Mark Williams	Matthew Stevens

== Round robin ==
Teams in bold indicate match winners.

Winning team	Score	Losing team
Scotland	5–5	Wales
**England**	**7**–3	Northern Ireland
**Ireland**	**8**–2	Northern Ireland
**England**	**6**–4	Scotland
**Wales**	**8**–2	Northern Ireland
**England**	**8**–2	Ireland
**Scotland**	**6**–4	Northern Ireland
**Wales**	**6**–4	Ireland
**Ireland**	**9**–1	Scotland
**Wales**	**7**–3	England

=== Final ===
Final: Best of 11 frames. Telewest Arena, Newcastle upon Tyne, England, 23 January 2000.
Ronnie O'Sullivan; John Parrott; Stephen Lee; Jimmy White; **England**	**6**–4	Mark Williams; Darren Morgan; Dominic Dale; Matthew Stevens; **Wales**
**O'Sullivan** beat Dale (1–0); **O'Sullivan** beat Stevens (2–0); **O'Sullivan** beat Williams (3–0); **Lee** beat Morgan (4–0); Lee lost to **Stevens** (4–1); Lee lost to **Williams** (4–2); **White** beat Williams (5–2); White lost to **Dale** (5–3); Parrott lost to **Stevens** (5–4); **Parrott** beat Morgan (6–4)
