= Players Tour Championship 2011/2012 – Event 10 =

Players Tour Championship 2011/2012 Event 10
Tournament information
- Dates: 27–30 November 2011
- Venue: World Snooker Academy
- City: Sheffield
- Country: England
- Organisation: World Snooker
- Format: Minor-ranking event
- Total prize fund: £53,000
- Winner's share: £10,000
- Highest break: David Gray (ENG) (147); Ricky Walden (ENG) (147)

Final
- Champion: Michael Holt (ENG)
- Runner-up: Dominic Dale (WAL)
- Score: 4–2

The Players Tour Championship 2011/2012 – Event 10 was a professional minor-ranking snooker tournament that took place between 27 and 30 November 2011 at the World Snooker Academy in Sheffield, England.

David Gray made the 80th official maximum break during his round 2 preliminary match against Robbie Williams. This was Gray's second 147 break. Ricky Walden made the 81st official maximum break during his last 128 match against Gareth Allen. This was Walden's first 147 break.

Michael Holt won his third professional title by defeating Dominic Dale 4–2 in the final.

== Prize fund and ranking points ==
The breakdown of prize money and ranking points of the event is shown below:

	Prize fund	Ranking points^{1}
Winner	£10,000	2,000
Runner-up	£5,000	1,600
Semi-finalist	£2,500	1,280
Quarter-finalist	£1,500	1,000
Last 16	£1,000	760
Last 32	£600	560
Last 64	£200	360
Maximum break	£3,000	–
Total	£53,000	–

- ^{1} Only professional players can earn ranking points.

== Main draw ==
=== Preliminary rounds ===
==== Round 1 ====
Best of 7 frames

(England) Liam Monk	4–2	(England) Gary Wilson
(England) Chris Norbury	4–1	(Australia) Ryan Thomerson
(England) Joel Walker	4–0	(England) James Murdoch
(England) Sean O'Sullivan	4–0	(England) Barry Stark
(England) Greg Davis	2–4	(Wales) Duane Jones

(Wales) Stephen Ellis	4–2	(Wales) Jak Jones
(Scotland) Ross Higgins	0–4	(England) Jamie O' Neill
(England) Christopher Keogan	3–4	(England) Mitchell Mann
(England) Jeff Cundy	4–0	(Pakistan) Omer Butt

==== Round 2 ====
Best of 7 frames

(England) Michael Sanderson	1–4	(England) William Lemons
(England) Stephen Craigie	2–4	(England) Shane Castle
(England) Hanzla Zahid	4–3	(England) Shaun Wilkes
(England) Scott Bell	1–4	(England) Jordan Winbourne
(England) Phil O'Kane	3–4	(England) Sydney Wilson
(China) Zhang Anda	4–2	(England) Mitchell Travis
(England) Oliver Brown	2–4	(England) Ian Burns
(England) Ben Harrison	4–3	(England) Liam Monk
(England) Reanne Evans	4–1	(England) Sachin Plaha
(England) Paul Metcalf	4–3	(England) Robert Tickner
(Australia) Jamie Brown	1–4	(England) Chris Norbury
(England) Jame McGouran	4–3	(England) Joel Walker
(England) Nick Jennings	4–2	(England) Danny Brindle
(England) Craig Steadman	3–4	(England) Sean O'Sullivan
(England) Rogelio Esteiro	0–4	(China) Chen Zhe
(England) Kyren Wilson	4–2	(England) Antony Parsons

(Wales) Kishan Hirani	1–4	(England) Justin Astley
(England) Saqib Nasir	2–4	(Wales) Duane Jones
(England) Ashley Carty	4–1	(India) David Singh
(Belgium) Hans Blanckaert	2–4	(England) Michael Wasley
(England) Alan Edmonds	3–4	(England) Jordan Church
(England) Matthew Day	3–4	(England) Zak Surety
(England) Robbie Williams	2–4	(England) David Gray
(Northern Ireland) Billy Brown	0–4	(Wales) Stephen Ellis
(England) Matthew Gevaux	0–4	(Wales) Gareth Allen
(England) Eric Pei	0–4	(England) Sam Harvey
(England) James Hill	1–4	(England) Jamie O' Neill
(England) James Cahill	4–3	(England) Mitchell Mann
(Isle of Man) Darryl Hill	2–4	(England) Jeff Cundy
(England) Thomas Wealthy	1–4	(England) Ricky Norris
(Scotland) Michael Leslie	4–1	(Wales) Jamie Clarke
(England) Neal Jones	2–4	(England) Oliver Lines

=== Main rounds ===
==== Top half ====
===== Section 1 =====
Last 128; Best of 7 frames
(Australia) Neil Robertson	4
(England) William Lemons	0
(Northern Ireland) Mark Allen	4
(England) Shane Castle	2
(Northern Ireland) Gerard Greene	4
(England) Hanzla Zahid	0
(England) Tom Ford	4
(England) Jordan Winbourne	1
(Scotland) John Higgins	4
(Republic of Ireland) David Hogan	2
(Scotland) Jamie Burnett	w/d
(England) Adrian Gunnell	w/o
(Scotland) Stephen Hendry	4
(Wales) Daniel Wells	2
(England) Martin Gould	4
(Northern Ireland) Joe Meara	3

Last 64; Best of 7 frames
(Australia) Neil Robertson	4
(Northern Ireland) Mark Allen	2
(Northern Ireland) Gerard Greene	4
(England) Tom Ford	2
(Scotland) John Higgins	4
(England) Adrian Gunnell	1
(Scotland) Stephen Hendry	4
(England) Martin Gould	1

Last 32; Best of 7 frames
(Australia) Neil Robertson	4
(Northern Ireland) Gerard Greene	1
(Scotland) John Higgins	4
(Scotland) Stephen Hendry	3

Last 16; Best of 7 frames
(Australia) Neil Robertson	3
(Scotland) John Higgins	4

===== Section 2 =====
Last 128; Best of 7 frames
(England) Rory McLeod	4
(England) Sydney Wilson	0
(Scotland) Stephen Maguire	4
(China) Zhang Anda	2
(England) Andrew Higginson	4
(England) Ian Burns	3
(England) Nigel Bond	4
(England) Ben Harrison	1
(Hong Kong) Marco Fu	4
(England) Reanne Evans	1
(Wales) Ryan Day	4
(India) Lucky Vatnani	1
(Belgium) Luca Brecel	1
(England) Matthew Couch	4
(England) Joe Perry	4
(England) Paul Metcalf	0

Last 64; Best of 7 frames
(England) Rory McLeod	4
(Scotland) Stephen Maguire	1
(England) Andrew Higginson	2
(England) Nigel Bond	4
(Hong Kong) Marco Fu	4
(Wales) Ryan Day	3
(England) Matthew Couch	2
(England) Joe Perry	4

Last 32; Best of 7 frames
(England) Rory McLeod	4
(England) Nigel Bond	1
(Hong Kong) Marco Fu	3
(England) Joe Perry	4

Last 16; Best of 7 frames
(England) Rory McLeod	1
(England) Joe Perry	4

===== Section 3 =====
Last 128; Best of 7 frames
(England) Stuart Bingham	4
(England) Stuart Carrington	2
(Thailand) Dechawat Poomjaeng	2
(England) Andrew Norman	4
(England) Anthony Hamilton	2
(England) Chris Norbury	4
(Wales) Matthew Stevens	4
(England) Jame McGouran	2
(England) Jamie Cope	4
(England) Adam Wicheard	2
(England) Andy Hicks	3
(England) Nick Jennings	4
(Wales) Michael White	0
(England) Mike Dunn	4
(England) Steve Davis	3
(China) Liu Song	4

Last 64; Best of 7 frames
(England) Stuart Bingham	3
(England) Andrew Norman	4
(England) Chris Norbury	4
(Wales) Matthew Stevens	1
(England) Jamie Cope	4
(England) Nick Jennings	0
(England) Mike Dunn	2
(China) Liu Song	4

Last 32; Best of 7 frames
(England) Andrew Norman	2
(England) Chris Norbury	4
(England) Jamie Cope	4
(China) Liu Song	2

Last 16; Best of 7 frames
(England) Chris Norbury	3
(England) Jamie Cope	4

===== Section 4 =====
Last 128; Best of 7 frames
(England) Adam Duffy	1
(Scotland) Scott MacKenzie	4
(China) Xiao Guodong	4
(England) Sean O'Sullivan	2
(England) Ali Carter	4
(China) Chen Zhe	1
(England) Ben Woollaston	4
(England) Kyren Wilson	2
(Scotland) Alan McManus	3
(England) Ian McCulloch	4
(England) Michael Holt	4
(India) Aditya Mehta	0
(England) Mark Selby	4
(England) Justin Astley	1
(England) Jack Lisowski	4
(England) Sam Craigie	1

Last 64; Best of 7 frames
(Scotland) Scott MacKenzie	4
(China) Xiao Guodong	2
(England) Ali Carter	3
(England) Ben Woollaston	4
(England) Ian McCulloch	1
(England) Michael Holt	4
(England) Mark Selby	4
(England) Jack Lisowski	2

Last 32; Best of 7 frames
(Scotland) Scott MacKenzie	0
(England) Ben Woollaston	4
(England) Michael Holt	4
(England) Mark Selby	3

Last 16; Best of 7 frames
(England) Ben Woollaston	1
(England) Michael Holt	4

==== Bottom half ====
===== Section 5 =====
Last 128; Best of 7 frames
(England) Judd Trump	3
(China) Tian Pengfei	4
(Thailand) James Wattana	0
(England) Barry Pinches	4
(England) Barry Hawkins	w/o
(Northern Ireland) Joe Swail	w/d
(England) Dave Harold	4
(England) Robert Milkins	3
(England) Liam Highfield	4
(Republic of Ireland) David Morris	1
(England) Mark Davis	3
(England) David Grace	4
(Malta) Tony Drago	0
(Wales) Duane Jones	4
(England) Jimmy Robertson	4
(England) Rod Lawler	1

Last 64; Best of 7 frames
(China) Tian Pengfei	4
(England) Barry Pinches	0
(England) Barry Hawkins	1
(England) Dave Harold	4
(England) Liam Highfield	2
(England) David Grace	4
(Wales) Duane Jones	3
(England) Jimmy Robertson	4

Last 32; Best of 7 frames
(China) Tian Pengfei	2
(England) Dave Harold	4
(England) David Grace	4
(England) Jimmy Robertson	3

Last 16; Best of 7 frames
(England) Dave Harold	4
(England) David Grace	2

===== Section 6 =====
Last 128; Best of 7 frames
(Scotland) Graeme Dott	4
(England) Ashley Carty	0
(China) Liu Chuang	1
(England) Michael Wasley	4
(England) Mark Joyce	4
(England) Jordan Church	1
(Republic of Ireland) Fergal O'Brien	4
(England) Alfie Burden	0
(Scotland) Marcus Campbell	4
(Wales) Andrew Pagett	1
(England) Stephen Lee	4
(England) Zak Surety	0
(England) Joe Jogia	0
(England) Paul Davison	4
(England) Simon Bedford	4
(England) David Gray	2

Last 64; Best of 7 frames
(Scotland) Graeme Dott	4
(England) Michael Wasley	0
(England) Mark Joyce	0
(Republic of Ireland) Fergal O'Brien	4
(Scotland) Marcus Campbell	0
(England) Stephen Lee	4
(England) Paul Davison	1
(England) Simon Bedford	4

Last 32; Best of 7 frames
(Scotland) Graeme Dott	4
(Republic of Ireland) Fergal O'Brien	2
(England) Stephen Lee	4
(England) Simon Bedford	1

Last 16; Best of 7 frames
(Scotland) Graeme Dott	3
(England) Stephen Lee	4

===== Section 7 =====
Last 128; Best of 7 frames
(England) Mark King	4
(Wales) Stephen Ellis	2
(England) Ricky Walden	4
(Wales) Gareth Allen	1
(China) Yu Delu	4
(England) Sam Harvey	1
(China) Li Yan	3
(Wales) Mark Williams	4
(England) Matthew Selt	1
(England) Jamie O' Neill	4
(England) David Gilbert	4
(Norway) Kurt Maflin	1
(England) Shaun Murphy	4
(England) James Cahill	0
(Wales) Jamie Jones	3
(Wales) Dominic Dale	4

Last 64; Best of 7 frames
(England) Mark King	3
(England) Ricky Walden	4
(China) Yu Delu	1
(Wales) Mark Williams	4
(England) Jamie O' Neill	4
(England) David Gilbert	2
(England) Shaun Murphy	2
(Wales) Dominic Dale	4

Last 32; Best of 7 frames
(England) Ricky Walden	4
(Wales) Mark Williams	3
(England) Jamie O' Neill	1
(Wales) Dominic Dale	4

Last 16; Best of 7 frames
(England) Ricky Walden	2
(Wales) Dominic Dale	4

===== Section 8 =====
Last 128; Best of 7 frames
(China) Ding Junhui	2
(China) Cao Yupeng	4
(China) Liang Wenbo	4
(England) Jeff Cundy	1
(England) Jimmy White	4
(England) Peter Ebdon	2
(Scotland) Anthony McGill	4
(Poland) Kacper Filipiak	0
(Republic of Ireland) Ken Doherty	4
(England) Ricky Norris	0
(England) Peter Lines	4
(Scotland) Michael Leslie	2
(Thailand) Passakorn Suwannawat	4
(England) Oliver Lines	1
(England) Ronnie O'Sullivan	2
(England) Sam Baird	4

Last 64; Best of 7 frames
(China) Cao Yupeng	2
(China) Liang Wenbo	4
(England) Jimmy White	0
(Scotland) Anthony McGill	4
(Republic of Ireland) Ken Doherty	4
(England) Peter Lines	3
(Thailand) Passakorn Suwannawat	2
(England) Sam Baird	4

Last 32; Best of 7 frames
(China) Liang Wenbo	4
(Scotland) Anthony McGill	3
(Republic of Ireland) Ken Doherty	4
(England) Sam Baird	2

Last 16; Best of 7 frames
(China) Liang Wenbo	4
(Republic of Ireland) Ken Doherty	3

==== Finals ====
Quarter-finals; Best of 7 frames		Semi-finals; Best of 7 frames		Final; Best of 7 frames
(Scotland) John Higgins	4
(England) Joe Perry	3	(Scotland) John Higgins	2
(England) Jamie Cope	0	(England) Michael Holt	4
(England) Michael Holt	4			(England) Michael Holt	4
(England) Dave Harold	1			(Wales) Dominic Dale	2
(England) Stephen Lee	4	(England) Stephen Lee	2
(Wales) Dominic Dale	4	(Wales) Dominic Dale	4
(China) Liang Wenbo	3

== Century breaks ==
- 147, 109 – Ricky Walden
- 147 – David Gray
- 145 – Peter Lines
- 142, 103, 102 – Ben Woollaston
- 134, 131 – Ken Doherty
- 133 – Jimmy Robertson
- 132, 106 – Tom Ford
- 132, 102 – Cao Yupeng
- 130, 120, 109, 103, 101 – Marco Fu
- 129, 100 – Graeme Dott
- 129 – Ali Carter
- 128 – Liu Song
- 126 – Anthony McGill
- 123, 100 – Tian Pengfei
- 123 – Ryan Day
- 123 – Joe Perry
- 121 – Martin Gould
- 120 – Chris Norbury
- 120 – Neil Robertson
- 119 – Jamie Cope
- 119 – Rory McLeod
- 119 – Stephen Lee
- 118 – Reanne Evans
- 113, 106 – Duane Jones
- 113, 106 – Dave Harold
- 113 – Dominic Dale
- 110, 103 – Stephen Maguire
- 110 – Stephen Hendry
- 109 – Scott MacKenzie
- 108 – Fergal O'Brien
- 106 – Liam Highfield
- 105 – Andrew Norman
- 104 – John Higgins
- 102 – Michael Holt
- 102 – Sam Baird
- 101 – Andy Hicks
- 101 – Nigel Bond
- 101 – Judd Trump
- 100 – Jack Lisowski
- 100 – David Gilbert
