= 2014 Shanghai Masters (snooker) =

Bank of Communications OTO Shanghai Masters

Tournament information
- Dates: 8–14 September 2014
- Venue: Shanghai Grand Stage
- City: Shanghai
- Country: China
- Organisation: World Snooker
- Format: Ranking event
- Total prize fund: £450,000
- Winner's share: £85,000
- Highest break: Barry Hawkins (ENG) (144)

Final
- Champion: Stuart Bingham (ENG)
- Runner-up: Mark Allen (NIR)
- Score: 10–3

The 2014 Bank of Communications OTO Shanghai Masters was a professional ranking snooker tournament that took place between 8–14 September 2014 at the Shanghai Grand Stage in Shanghai, China. The eighth edition of the tournament since it was first held in 2007, it was the third ranking event of the 2014/2015 season. It was sponsored by the Bank of Communications.

Ding Junhui was the defending champion, but he lost 4–6 against Stuart Bingham in the semi-finals.

Bingham won his second ranking title by defeating Mark Allen 10–3 in the final.

== Prize fund ==
The breakdown of prize money for this year is shown below:

- Winner: £85,000
- Runner-up: £35,000
- Semi-final: £19,500
- Quarter-final: £12,000
- Last 16: £8,000
- Last 32: £6,000
- Last 48: £2,500
- Last 64: £1,750
- Last 96: £400
- Non-televised highest break: £200
- Televised highest break: £2,000
- Total: £450,000

== Wildcard round ==
These matches were played in Shanghai on 8 and 9 September 2014.

Match		Score	
WC1	Liang Wenbo (CHN)	1–5	Yan Bingtao (CHN)
WC2	Li Hang (CHN)	5–3	Chen Zifan (CHN)
WC3	Michael White (WAL)	5–1	Niu Zhuang (CHN)
WC4	Ryan Day (WAL)	5–0	Xu Si (CHN)
WC5	Mark Williams (WAL)	5–2	Zhang Yong (CHN)
WC6	Matthew Selt (ENG)	3–5	Zhao Xintong (CHN)
WC7	Michael Holt (ENG)	5–2	Yuan Sijun (CHN)
WC8	Ken Doherty (IRL)	5–3	Huang Jiahao (CHN)

== Main draw ==
Last 32; Best of 9 frames
1	(China) Ding Junhui	5
(England) Jack Lisowski	1
14	(England) Joe Perry	4
(England) Martin Gould	5
15	(Scotland) Graeme Dott	5
(China) Yan Bingtao	2
7	(England) Shaun Murphy	5
(Northern Ireland) Joe Swail	4
6	(England) Judd Trump	2
(Wales) Dominic Dale	5
11	(England) Stuart Bingham	5
(China) Li Hang	3
13	(Scotland) Stephen Maguire	5
(England) Jimmy Robertson	1
4	(England) Ronnie O'Sullivan	3
(Scotland) Alan McManus	5
3	(Australia) Neil Robertson	4
(Wales) Michael White	5
9	(Scotland) John Higgins	4
(Wales) Ryan Day	5
10	(Northern Ireland) Mark Allen	5
(England) Andrew Higginson	3
5	(England) Barry Hawkins	4
(Wales) Mark Williams	5
8	(Hong Kong) Marco Fu	4
(China) Zhao Xintong	5
16	(England) Robert Milkins	1
(Republic of Ireland) Fergal O'Brien	5
12	(England) Ricky Walden	2
(England) Michael Holt	5
2	(England) Mark Selby	5
(Republic of Ireland) Ken Doherty	2

Last 16; Best of 9 frames
1	(China) Ding Junhui	5
(England) Martin Gould	3
15	(Scotland) Graeme Dott	5
7	(England) Shaun Murphy	3
(Wales) Dominic Dale	1
11	(England) Stuart Bingham	5
13	(Scotland) Stephen Maguire	1
(Scotland) Alan McManus	5
(Wales) Michael White	5
(Wales) Ryan Day	2
10	(Northern Ireland) Mark Allen	5
(Wales) Mark Williams	1
(China) Zhao Xintong	3
(Republic of Ireland) Fergal O'Brien	5
(England) Michael Holt	3
2	(England) Mark Selby	5

Quarter-finals; Best of 9 frames
1	(China) Ding Junhui	5
15	(Scotland) Graeme Dott	2
11	(England) Stuart Bingham	5
(Scotland) Alan McManus	1
(Wales) Michael White	4
10	(Northern Ireland) Mark Allen	5
(Republic of Ireland) Fergal O'Brien	0
2	(England) Mark Selby	5

Semi-finals; Best of 11 frames
1	(China) Ding Junhui	4
11	(England) Stuart Bingham	6
10	(Northern Ireland) Mark Allen	6
2	(England) Mark Selby	5

Final; Best of 19 frames
11	(England) Stuart Bingham	10
10	(Northern Ireland) Mark Allen	3

== Final ==
Final: Best of 19 frames. Referee: Deng Shihao. Shanghai Grand Stage, Shanghai, China, 14 September 2014.
Stuart Bingham (11); England	10–3	Mark Allen (10); Northern Ireland
Afternoon: 99–0 (99), 67–52 (Allen 51), 71–19, 69–22 (68), 0–101 (97), 61–69, 64–28, 0–75 (69), 56–48; Evening: 66–57, 56–1, 78–49 (57), 81–16 (81)
99	Highest break	97
0	Century breaks	0
4	50+ breaks	3

== Qualifying ==
These matches were held between 12 and 15 August 2014 at the Barnsley Metrodome in Barnsley, England.

Round 1 Best of 9 frames
(England) Michael Georgiou	5
(England) Ryan Clark	0
(England) Barry Pinches	w/o
(Thailand) Thanawat Thirapongpaiboon	w/d
(England) Oliver Lines	1
(England) Allan Taylor	5
(England) David Grace	4
(China) Tian Pengfei	5
(England) Alex Davies	5
(England) Mitchell Mann	4
(England) Liam Highfield	5
(England) Sydney Wilson	2
(England) Kyren Wilson	5
(Wales) Daniel Wells	3
(Northern Ireland) Joe Swail	5
(England) Zak Surety	4
(Scotland) Ross Muir	2
(England) Ian Burns	5
(Scotland) Fraser Patrick	4
(England) Michael Wasley	5
(China) Li Hang	w/o
(China) Zhang Anda	w/d
(England) Chris Norbury	3
(Scotland) Eden Sharav	5
(China) Lyu Haotian	5
(England) Chris Melling	1
(England) Craig Steadman	w/o
(Republic of Ireland) John Sutton	w/d
(Malta) Tony Drago	5
(Qatar) Ahmed Saif	3
(England) Hammad Miah	5
(Scotland) Michael Leslie	3
(Finland) Robin Hull	5
(England) Oliver Brown	2
(Thailand) Ratchayothin Yotharuck	4
(Thailand) James Wattana	5
(England) Lee Page	5
(England) James Cahill	4
(Malta) Alex Borg	5
(England) Joe O'Connor	3
(Wales) Andrew Pagett	4
(England) Joel Walker	5
(Scotland) Scott Donaldson	5
(Wales) Jamie Clarke	3
(England) Andrew Norman	4
(England) Steven Hallworth	5
(China) Zhou Yuelong	w/o
(England) Steve Davis	w/d
(Australia) Vinnie Calabrese	5
(England) Ian Glover	4
(England) Chris Wakelin	5
(Switzerland) Alexander Ursenbacher	1
(Thailand) Noppon Saengkham	5
(England) Ashley Carty	2
(England) Elliot Slessor	2
(Wales) Lee Walker	5
(England) Sam Baird	5
(China) Lu Ning	3
(England) Stuart Carrington	5
(China) Lu Chenwei	2
(China) Cao Xinlong	2
(Wales) Jak Jones	5
(England) John Astley	5
(Canada) Alex Pagulayan	2

Round 2 Best of 9 frames
(England) Jack Lisowski	5
(England) Michael Georgiou	4
(China) Cao Yupeng	5
(England) Barry Pinches	0
(England) Mike Dunn	5
(England) Allan Taylor	3
(England) Alfie Burden	4
(China) Tian Pengfei	5
(England) Peter Lines	3
(England) Alex Davies	5
(Scotland) Anthony McGill	5
(England) Liam Highfield	3
(England) David Gilbert	1
(England) Kyren Wilson	5
(England) Jimmy White	4
(Northern Ireland) Joe Swail	5
(Scotland) Jamie Burnett	4
(England) Ian Burns	5
(Northern Ireland) Gerard Greene	2
(England) Michael Wasley	5
(England) Nigel Bond	2
(China) Li Hang	5
(Republic of Ireland) David Morris	5
(Scotland) Eden Sharav	3
(England) Jimmy Robertson	5
(China) Lyu Haotian	4
(England) Ben Woollaston	5
(England) Craig Steadman	4
(Wales) Jamie Jones	5
(Malta) Tony Drago	2
(England) Rod Lawler	5
(England) Hammad Miah	3
(England) Rory McLeod	5
(Finland) Robin Hull	2
(Thailand) Dechawat Poomjaeng	5
(Thailand) James Wattana	1
(England) Robbie Williams	5
(England) Lee Page	3
(Belgium) Luca Brecel	5
(Malta) Alex Borg	1
(Norway) Kurt Maflin	5
(England) Joel Walker	3
(England) Andrew Higginson	5
(Scotland) Scott Donaldson	4
(England) Dave Harold	2
(England) Steven Hallworth	5
(Thailand) Thepchaiya Un-Nooh	5
(China) Zhou Yuelong	3
(England) Matthew Selt	5
(Australia) Vinnie Calabrese	1
(India) Aditya Mehta	4
(England) Chris Wakelin	5
(China) Yu Delu	1
(Thailand) Noppon Saengkham	5
(England) Jamie Cope	5
(Wales) Lee Walker	2
(England) Gary Wilson	4
(England) Sam Baird	5
(England) Anthony Hamilton	2
(England) Stuart Carrington	5
(Republic of Ireland) Ken Doherty	5
(Wales) Jak Jones	4
(Scotland) Marcus Campbell	3
(England) John Astley	5

Round 3 Best of 9 frames
(England) Jack Lisowski	5
(China) Cao Yupeng	4
(England) Mike Dunn	5
(China) Tian Pengfei	1
(England) Alex Davies	5
(Scotland) Anthony McGill	4
(England) Kyren Wilson	4
(Northern Ireland) Joe Swail	5
(England) Ian Burns	0
(England) Michael Wasley	5
(China) Li Hang	5
(Republic of Ireland) David Morris	2
(England) Jimmy Robertson	5
(England) Ben Woollaston	4
(Wales) Jamie Jones	5
(England) Rod Lawler	1
(England) Rory McLeod	3
(Thailand) Dechawat Poomjaeng	5
(England) Robbie Williams	2
(Belgium) Luca Brecel	5
(Norway) Kurt Maflin	0
(England) Andrew Higginson	5
(England) Steven Hallworth	3
(Thailand) Thepchaiya Un-Nooh	5
(England) Matthew Selt	5
(England) Chris Wakelin	1
(Thailand) Noppon Saengkham	1
(England) Jamie Cope	5
(England) Sam Baird	4
(England) Stuart Carrington	5
(Republic of Ireland) Ken Doherty	5
(England) John Astley	2

Round 4 Best of 9 frames
(Wales) Matthew Stevens	3
(England) Jack Lisowski	5
(England) Martin Gould	5
(England) Mike Dunn	4
(China) Liang Wenbo	5
(England) Alex Davies	2
(England) Peter Ebdon	1
(Northern Ireland) Joe Swail	5
(Wales) Dominic Dale	5
(England) Michael Wasley	4
(England) Mark Joyce	2
(China) Li Hang	5
(China) Xiao Guodong	3
(England) Jimmy Robertson	5
(Scotland) Alan McManus	5
(Wales) Jamie Jones	3
(Wales) Michael White	5
(Thailand) Dechawat Poomjaeng	3
(Wales) Ryan Day	5
(Belgium) Luca Brecel	3
(England) Tom Ford	4
(England) Andrew Higginson	5
(Wales) Mark Williams	5
(Thailand) Thepchaiya Un-Nooh	3
(England) Mark Davis	2
(England) Matthew Selt	5
(Republic of Ireland) Fergal O'Brien	5
(England) Jamie Cope	2
(England) Michael Holt	5
(England) Stuart Carrington	4
(England) Mark King	0
(Republic of Ireland) Ken Doherty	5

== Century breaks ==
=== Qualifying stage centuries ===
- 142 – Kurt Maflin
- 140 – Matthew Selt
- 139 – Jak Jones
- 136 – David Morris
- 136 – Jimmy Robertson
- 129, 108, 102 – Stuart Carrington
- 128, 110 – Michael White
- 125 – Cao Yupeng
- 123, 120, 111 – Dominic Dale
- 121 – Rory McLeod
- 120 – Alan McManus
- 119 – Noppon Saengkham
- 117 – Robin Hull
- 112, 108 – Michael Wasley
- 112 – Kyren Wilson
- 112 – Li Hang
- 111 – Xiao Guodong
- 110 – Alex Davies
- 110 – Jamie Cope
- 107, 105 – Matthew Selt
- 106 – Tian Pengfei
- 103 – Gerard Greene
- 102 – Andrew Higginson
- 101 – Joe Swail
- 101 – Ian Burns
- 100 – Thepchaiya Un-Nooh
- 100 – Jack Lisowski

=== Televised stage centuries ===
- 144 – Barry Hawkins
- 141, 136, 102 – Li Hang
- 139 – Ronnie O'Sullivan
- 128, 104 – Michael White
- 128, 101 – Ding Junhui
- 121, 102 – Shaun Murphy
- 118, 114, 103 – Stuart Bingham
- 117 – Marco Fu
- 116 – Mark Selby
- 115 – Mark Allen
- 114 – Huang Jiahao
- 114 – Zhao Xintong
- 106 – Chen Zifan
- 105 – Martin Gould
- 103, 102 – Dominic Dale
- 102 – Ryan Day
- 100 – Judd Trump
