= Dominic Dale =

Welsh retired snooker player (born 1971)

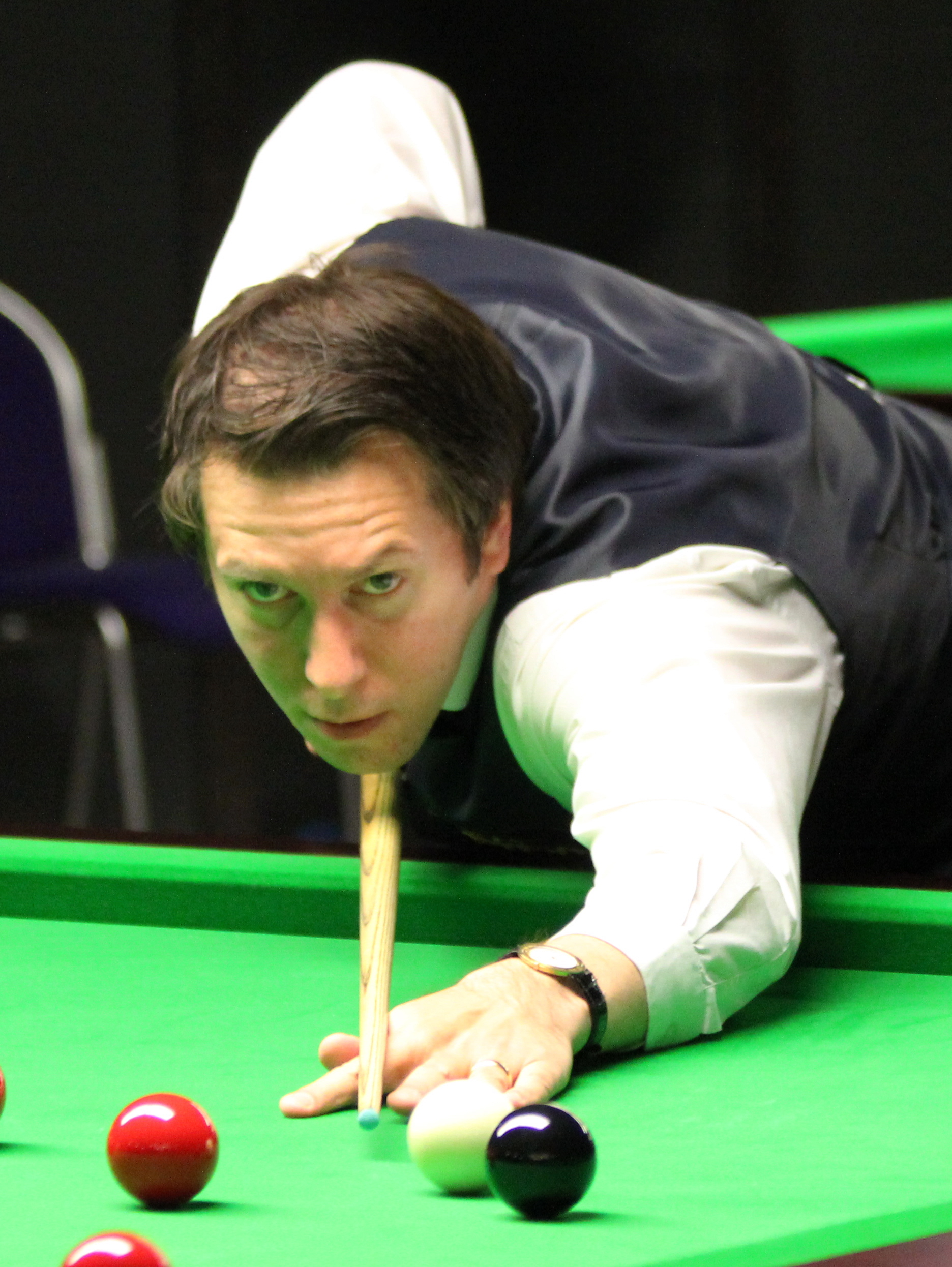
- Dale in 2016

Personal information
- Nickname: The Spaceman
- Born: 29 December 1971 (age 54) Coventry, England

Sport
- Country: Wales
- Sport: Snooker
- Professional: 1992–2025
- Highest ranking: 19 (1999/00)
- Century breaks: 248

Tournament wins
- Ranking: 2
- Minor-ranking: 1

Dominic Dale (born Christopher Dale; 29 December 1971) is a Welsh retired professional snooker player, as well as a current snooker commentator, pundit and presenter for BBC Cymru Wales and TNT Sports (formerly BT Sport) in the United Kingdom.

Nicknamed "The Spaceman" and known for his flamboyant image, Dale won two ranking titles during his professional career, the 1997 Grand Prix, where he defeated John Higgins 9–6 in the final, and the 2007 Shanghai Masters, where he beat Ryan Day 10–6 in the final. He made ten appearances at the main stage of the World Championship at the Crucible Theatre, reaching the quarter-finals twice, in 2000 and 2014. He attained his highest world ranking of 19th in the 1999–2000 season.

Dale retired from the professional tour at the end of the 2024–25 season, aged 53.

== Career ==
Dale was born in Coventry, England. He won the Welsh Amateur Championship, which allowed him to compete at the World Amateur Championship in Bangkok. Dale reached the final, but lost 9–11 against Noppadon Noppachorn. Dale turned professional for the 1992–93 season.

He has won two ranking tournaments in his career, the first of which – the Grand Prix in 1997 – he won while ranked number 54 in the world, beating then world number 2 John Higgins 9–6 in the final. It took him a decade to repeat the achievement at the 2007 Shanghai Masters, where he defeated compatriot Ryan Day 10–6 in the final, from 2–6 behind. On his way to the Shanghai final he beat Rory McLeod, Ken Doherty, Adrian Gunnell, Dave Harold and Mark Selby.

Both of his ranking victories were in the season-opening tournaments; he also reached the semi-finals of the season-opening events in 2002 (LG Cup) and 2006 (Northern Ireland Trophy). He also beat Peter Ebdon at the 2008 Malta Cup, despite a bout of stomach cramps and a drinking session the night before the match.

Dale is the only player to have won multiple ranking tournaments without ever reaching the top 16, but he was 14th on the one-year list for both 1997/1998 and 1999/2000 (missing out due to an unsuccessful 1998/1999 season).

His best World Championship performances were in 2000 and 2014, when he reached the quarter-finals.

Dale won the third professional tournament of his career when he won Event 6 of the Players Tour Championship 2010/2011, beating Martin Gould 4–3 in the final. This win, along with other consistent performances, were enough to see him back into the top 32 players. He also qualified for the World Championship for the first time since 2004, although he was comprehensively beaten 10–2 in the first round by Ronnie O'Sullivan.

=== 2011/2012 season ===
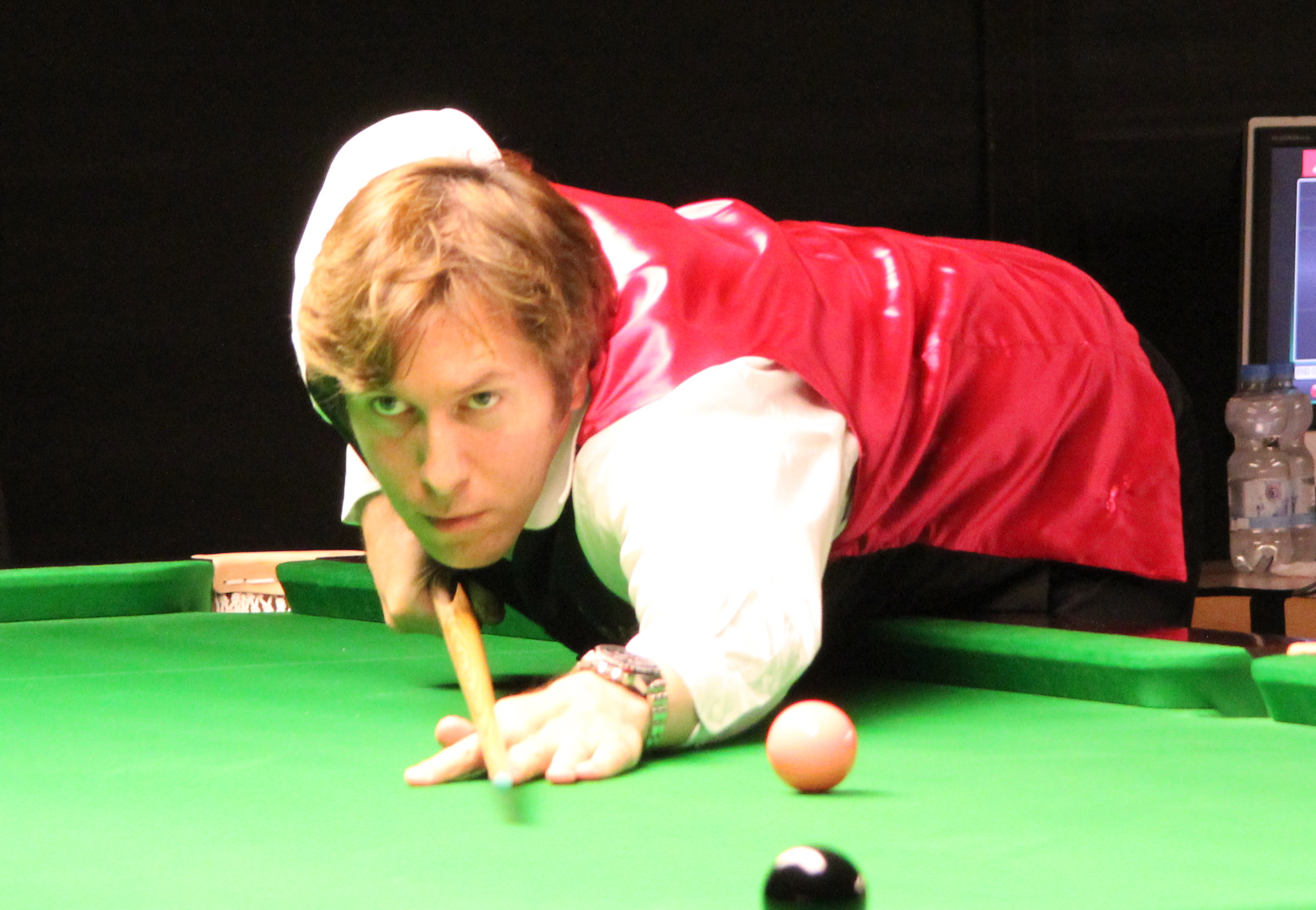
Dale during the 2011 Paul Hunter Classic

Dale had a good start to his 2011–12 season as he reached the quarter-finals of the first event, the Australian Goldfields Open. Dale was originally due to meet Ronnie O'Sullivan in the first round, but due to his withdrawal for medical reasons he instead played amateur Steve Mifsud and won 5–2. He then beat home favourite Neil Robertson on the final black in a 5–4 win lasting almost four hours, before losing to Mark Williams in another final-frame decider, having never been behind in the match until the end. He then reached the final stages of the UK Championship for the first time since 2005 by beating Nigel Bond in the final qualifying round and was drawn against Judd Trump in the last 32. Dale led 4–2 before Trump had a large slice of fortune in the seventh frame by fluking a pink. Dale would eventually lose the match 4–6. He also reached the 2012 PTC Finals courtesy of finishing twentieth in the Order of Merit. His qualification was largely due to making the final of Event 10, where he was beaten by Michael Holt 2–4. In the Finals he lost 2–4 to Xiao Guodong in the first round. Dale qualified for the World Championship with a 10–3 victory over Ben Woollaston to set up another first round meeting with Judd Trump. He led the match 7–6 against an opponent who later revealed to be suffering from food poisoning, before conceding four successive frames to lose 7–10. Dale finished the season ranked world number 23, meaning he had climbed 8 places during the year.

=== 2012/2013 season ===
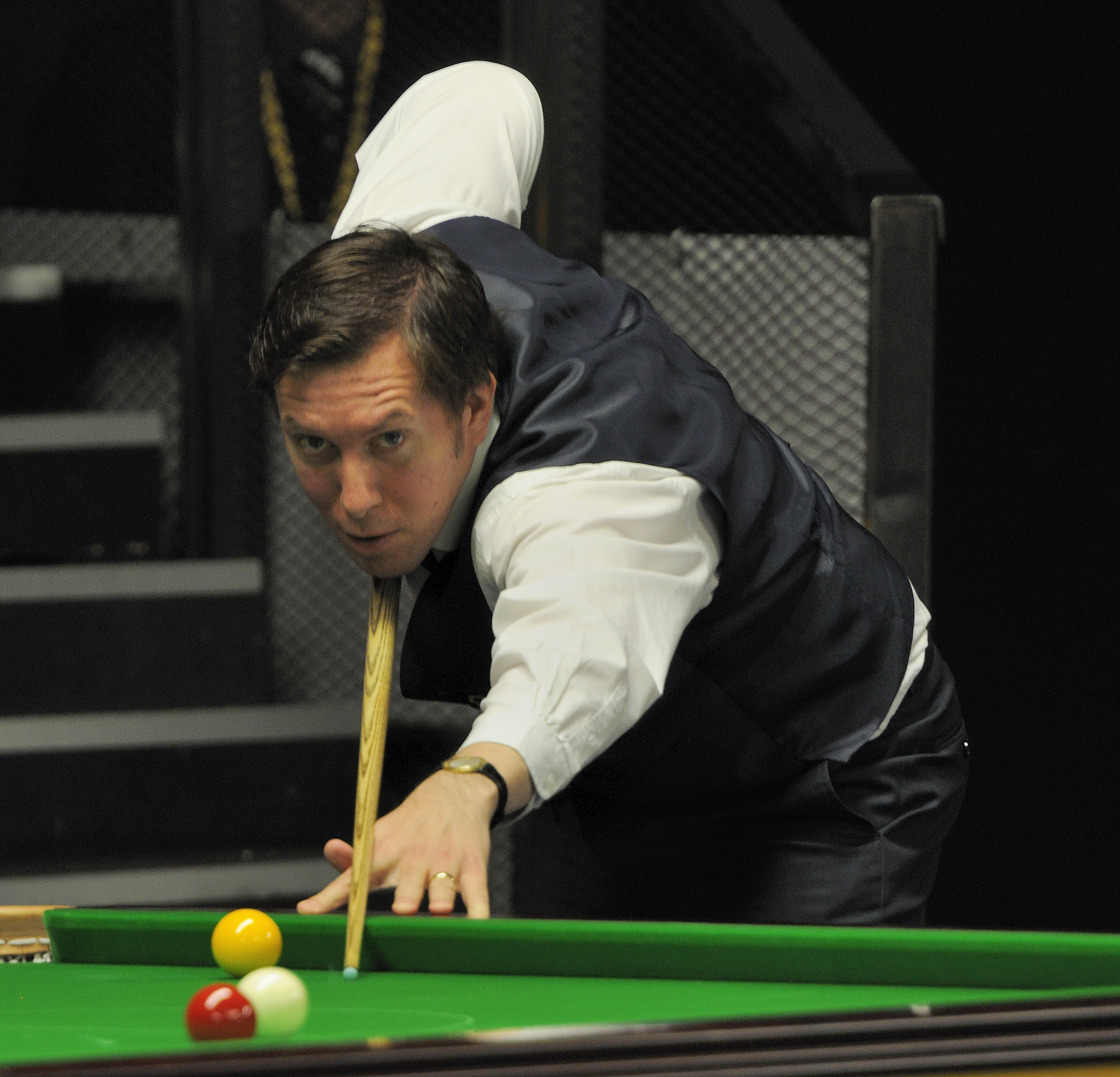
2013 German Masters

Dale qualified for nine of the eleven ranking events during the 2012–13 season, but lost in the first round in eight of them. The exception was at the International Championship where he beat Graeme Dott 6–3, before losing 5–6 to 14-year-old Lü Haotian in the second round. Dale's best run in the PTC's came at Event Three by reaching the semi-finals in a run that included a 4–2 over Mark Selby, but he lost to world number 65 Rod Lawler 0–4. Dale finished 28th on the Order of Merit, just outside the top 26 who qualified for the Finals. Dale reached the opening round of the World Championship by dispatching Alfie Burden 10–5 and played Judd Trump at this stage for the second successive year where he was defeated 10–5. His end of season ranking was world number 23 for the second year in a row.

=== 2013/2014 season ===
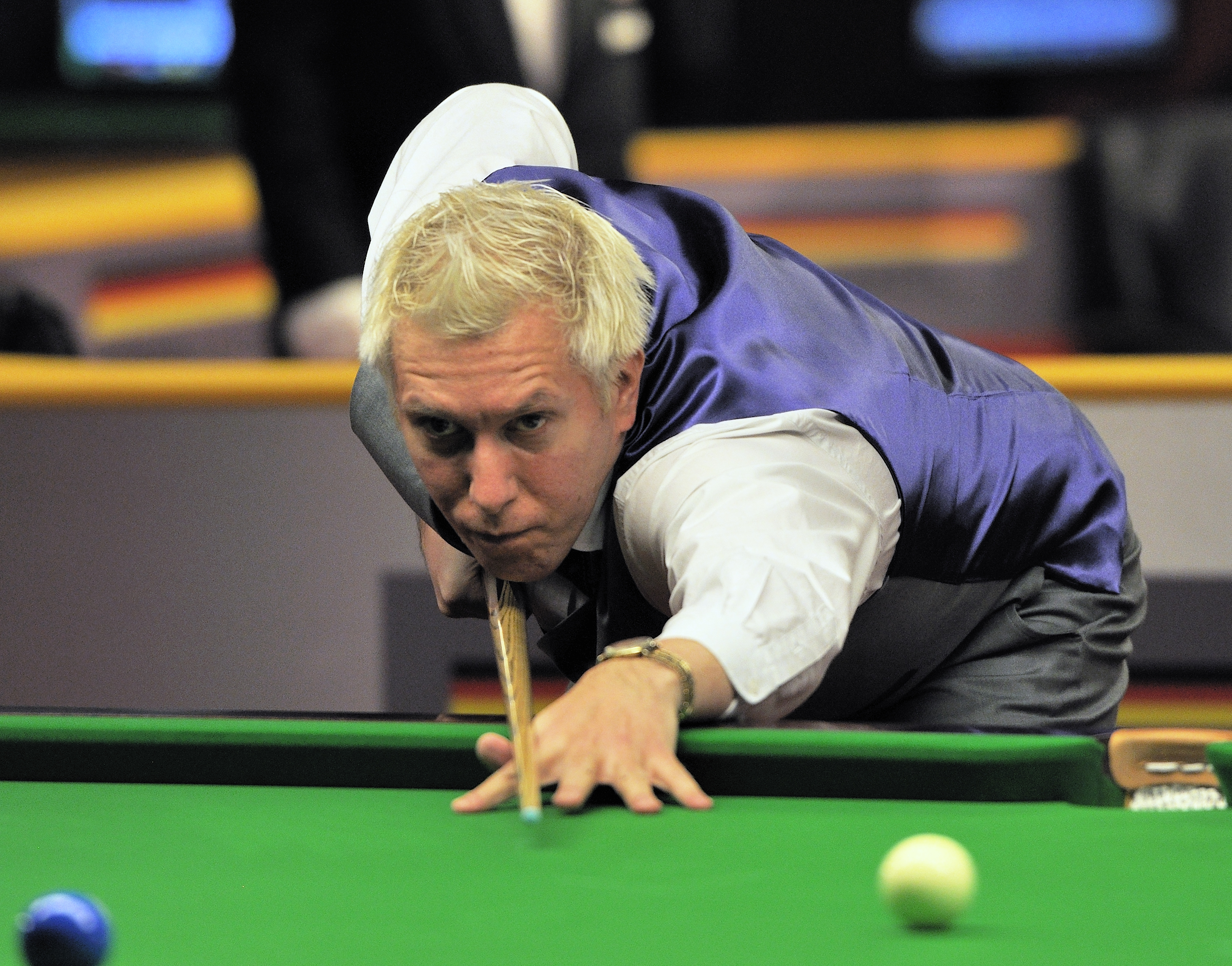
2014 German Masters

Dale reached his second quarter-final in the Australian Goldfields Open in three years in the early stages of the 2013–14 season. He eliminated Mike Dunn and Fergal O'Brien, but then lost 5–1 to Marco Fu. In the next four ranking events he lost in the first round of two and failed qualify for both of the others.

In January 2014, Dale won the Snooker Shoot-Out final in Blackpool, beating Stuart Bingham in a close frame. Dale had received significant support from the crowd and had promised to sing My Way should he win the event. In his post-match interview he sang a short rendition of the song, showcasing an impressive baritone voice. The result seemed to kick start his season as the following week he beat Steve Davis and John Higgins at the German Masters, but let a 3–1 lead slip in the last 16 against Ding Junhui to lose 5–3. Dale also won two matches before falling at the third round in the Welsh Open and World Open, losing to Mark Selby and Alan McManus respectively.

Dale qualified for the World Championship courtesy of defeating Andrew Higginson in the final round of qualifying. He faced Mark Davis in the first round and beat him 10–5, marking his first win at the Crucible since 2000. Dale followed this up with a 13–4 win over Michael Wasley (who had beaten pre-tournament second favourite Ding Junhui in his opening match) to reach the quarter-finals for the second time, 14 years after the first. Dale played Barry Hawkins and trailed 11–5 after the second session, but then amazingly won seven frames in a row to be just one away from reaching the semi-finals and matching the biggest comeback at this stage ever at the Crucible. However, Hawkins won the two frames he required without giving Dale a chance to beat him 13–12. Later, Dale revealed that he had reverted to an old cue action before the start of the final session.

=== 2014/2015 season ===
Dale lost 5–3 to Mark Davis in the first round of the Australian Goldfields Open and he reached the semi-finals of the Six-red World Championship, where Ricky Walden beat him 7–1. At the Shanghai Masters he knocked out Judd Trump 5–2, before losing 5–1 to Stuart Bingham. This last 16 defeat would prove to be Dale's best finish in a ranking event this season as he could not win another match at a venue until the China Open, when he ousted Jimmy Robertson 5–3, but then fell 5–2 to Barry Hawkins in the second round. He had a consistent year in the minor-ranking European Tour events with a pair of last 16 exits helping him to finish 25th on the Order of Merit to claim the last qualification place for the Grand Final, where he was whitewashed 4–0 by Mark Selby in the opening round.

=== 2015/2016 season ===
At the International Championship, Dale defeated Matthew Selt 6–1 and then lost 6–3 to Joe Perry in the second round. His second round match with Peter Ebdon at the UK Championship finished at 1:30am as Dale relinquished a 5–4 advantage to be beaten 6–5. Breaks of 72, 73, 82 and 61 saw Dale sneak past Mark Williams in the opening round of the Players Championship Finals 4–3, before he lost 4–1 to Shaun Murphy. Dale won more than one match at a ranking event for the only time this season when he knocked out Jamie Jones and Darryl Hill at the China Open, but then was beaten 6–1 by Stephen Maguire in the third round.

=== 2016/2017 season ===
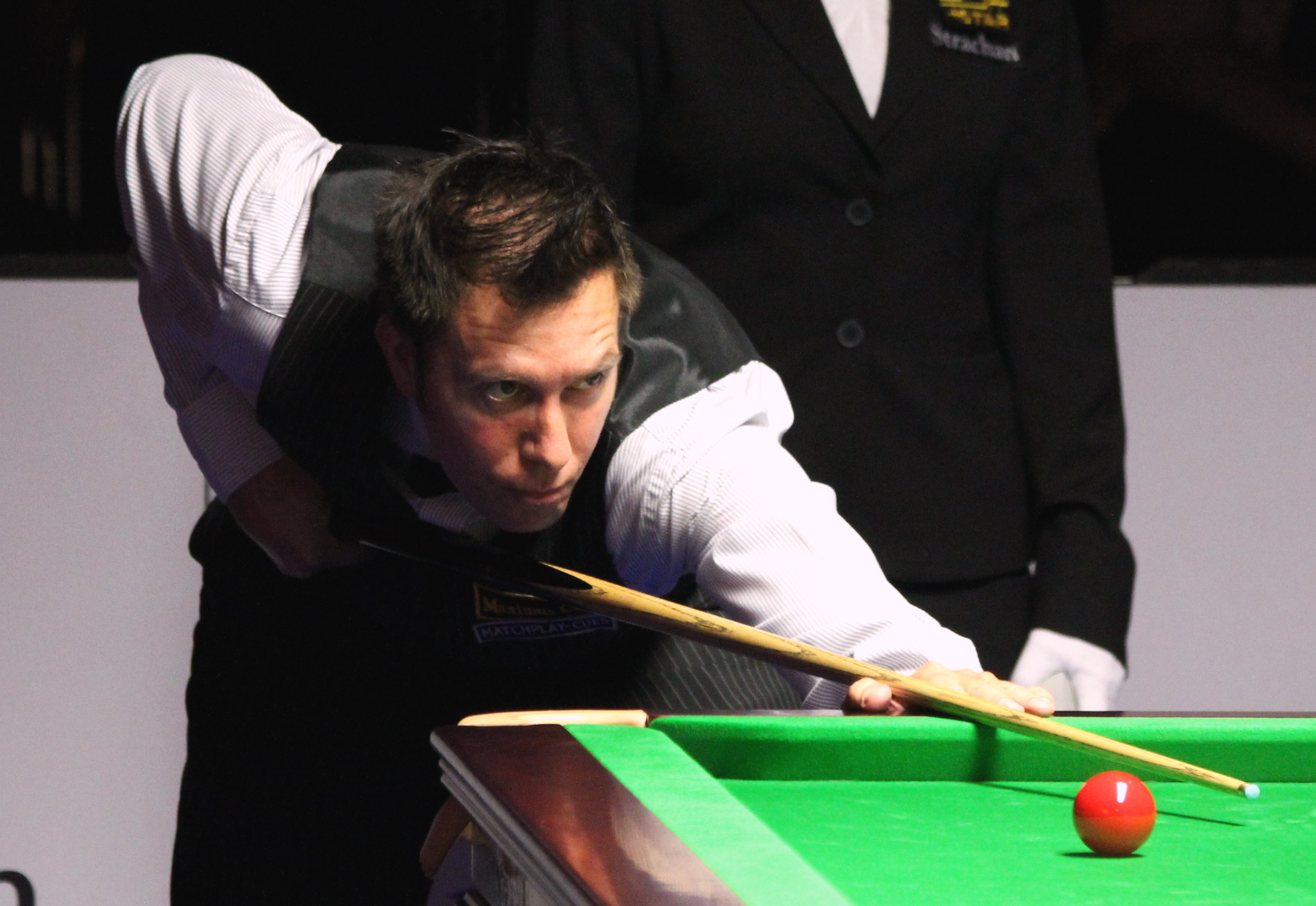
2016 Paul Hunter Classic

Dale saw off Ishpreet Chadha 4–2 and Marco Fu 4–0 to reach the third round of the Indian Open, where he lost 4–1 to Peter Ebdon. At the Paul Hunter Classic he enjoyed victories over Ben Woollaston, Ian Glover, Michael Holt, Yan Bingtao and Jimmy White to play in the semi-finals of a ranking event for the first time since 2007. Dale was defeated 4–2 by Mark Selby. He lost in the second round of the International Championship 6–2 to Stuart Bingham and won three frames in a row to take his third round match with Shaun Murphy at the UK Championship in to a final-frame decider. He had chances in it but could not take them to be ousted 6–5. In the final World Championship qualifying round Dale made the 200th century break of his career, but would be defeated 10–5 by Luca Brecel.

=== 2023/2024 season ===
At the 2024 World Championship, Dale, aged 52, became the oldest qualifier to reach the main draw since Steve Davis in 2010, but was beaten 1‍–‍10 by Kyren Wilson in the first round.

=== Retirement ===
Dale retired from professional snooker after failing to progress through qualifying for the 2025 World Championship. His final match was a defeat to Daniel Wells.

== Personal life ==
Dale was originally named Chris but changed his name while working at a law firm, as they offered to do it for free. He chose Dominic because he worked with two people called Dominic and Dominique and said he just "liked the name".

Dale's personality, dress sense and hair styles make him one of the more flamboyant players on the circuit. In his early years he wore a white suit with colourful shirts. In 2007 he sported bleached blonde hair with a bright pink shirt. His interests include snooker memorabilia, Art Deco and operatic singing. After his Shanghai Masters semi-final win, he celebrated by singing "My Way" at the post-match conference. and also did so after his victory in 2014 Snooker Shoot-Out. In December 2007 Dale moved to Vienna with his then girlfriend. His form declined after this move, which he attributed to not having a professional training partner in Vienna, and he returned to live in the UK four years later, although only for a year.

== Performance and rankings timeline ==
Tournament	1992/ 93	1993/ 94	1994/ 95	1995/ 96	1996/ 97	1997/ 98	1998/ 99	1999/ 00	2000/ 01	2001/ 02	2002/ 03	2003/ 04	2004/ 05	2005/ 06	2006/ 07	2007/ 08	2008/ 09	2009/ 10	2010/ 11	2011/ 12	2012/ 13	2013/ 14	2014/ 15	2015/ 16	2016/ 17	2017/ 18	2018/ 19	2019/ 20	2020/ 21	2021/ 22	2022/ 23	2023/ 24	2024/ 25
Ranking (Note: From the 2010/2011 season it shows the ranking at the beginning of the season)	(Note: New players on the Main Tour don't have a ranking)	164	99	79	87	54	23	19	20	20	20	28	32	34	39	31	32	34	45	31	23	23	24	33	38	32	46	(Note: Players qualified One Year Ranking List started the season without ranking points)	70	61	59	61	40
Ranking tournaments
Championship League	Tournament Not Held															Non-Ranking Event													2R	RR	RR	RR	RR
Xi'an Grand Prix	Tournament Not Held																																3R
Saudi Arabia Masters	Tournament Not Held																																A
English Open	Tournament Not Held																								1R	1R	1R	3R	1R	LQ	1R	1R	1R
British Open	LQ	2R	LQ	LQ	3R	3R	1R	2R	2R	2R	2R	2R	1R	Tournament Not Held																2R	LQ	1R	LQ
Wuhan Open	Tournament Not Held																															1R	LQ
Northern Ireland Open	Tournament Not Held																								4R	1R	1R	1R	3R	LQ	1R	1R	1R
International Championship	Tournament Not Held																				2R	LQ	1R	2R	2R	2R	LQ	LQ	Not Held			2R	LQ
UK Championship	LQ	LQ	LQ	LQ	1R	1R	2R	1R	3R	3R	2R	2R	2R	2R	LQ	LQ	LQ	LQ	LQ	1R	1R	1R	1R	2R	3R	2R	2R	1R	2R	3R	LQ	LQ	LQ
Shoot Out	Tournament Not Held																		Non-Ranking Event						3R	1R	4R	2R	1R	1R	SF	QF	A
Scottish Open (Note: The event was called the International Open (1992/1993–1996/1997) and the Players Championship (2003/2004))	LQ	1R	LQ	LQ	LQ	2R	2R	2R	1R	3R	1R	2R	Tournament Not Held								MR	Not Held			4R	2R	2R	1R	2R	LQ	LQ	3R	LQ
German Masters (Note: The event was called the German Open (1995/1996–1997/1998))	Not Held			LQ	LQ	LQ	NR	Tournament Not Held											2R	LQ	1R	3R	LQ	LQ	1R	LQ	LQ	LQ	2R	LQ	LQ	LQ	WD
Welsh Open	LQ	LQ	LQ	1R	1R	3R	1R	2R	1R	LQ	1R	SF	2R	1R	LQ	1R	1R	1R	1R	LQ	1R	3R	1R	1R	3R	2R	2R	4R	1R	LQ	2R	QF	1R
World Open (Note: The event was called the Grand Prix (1992/1993–2000/2001 and 2004/2005–2009/2010) and the LG Cup (2001/2002–2003/2004))	LQ	LQ	1R	LQ	LQ	W	1R	2R	1R	2R	1R	1R	2R	1R	RR	RR	LQ	LQ	LQ	1R	1R	3R	Not Held		LQ	1R	1R	1R	Not Held			2R	LQ
World Grand Prix	Tournament Not Held																						NR	DNQ	1R	DNQ	DNQ	DNQ	DNQ	DNQ	DNQ	1R	DNQ
Players Championship (Note: The event was called the Players Tour Championship Grand Final (2010/2011–2015/2016))	Tournament Not Held																		2R	1R	DNQ	DNQ	1R	2R	DNQ	DNQ	DNQ	DNQ	DNQ	DNQ	DNQ	DNQ	DNQ
Tour Championship	Tournament Not Held																										DNQ	DNQ	DNQ	DNQ	DNQ	DNQ	DNQ
World Championship	LQ	LQ	LQ	LQ	2R	LQ	1R	QF	LQ	1R	LQ	1R	LQ	LQ	LQ	LQ	LQ	LQ	1R	1R	1R	QF	LQ	LQ	LQ	LQ	LQ	LQ	LQ	LQ	LQ	1R	LQ
Non-ranking tournaments
Champion of Champions	Tournament Not Held																					A	1R	A	A	A	A	A	A	A	A	A	A
The Masters	LQ	LQ	LQ	LQ	LQ	LQ	LQ	LQ	LQ	LQ	LQ	LQ	A	A	A	LQ	A	A	A	A	A	A	A	A	A	A	A	A	A	A	A	A	A
Championship League	Tournament Not Held															RR	A	A	A	RR	RR	RR	RR	RR	A	RR	A	RR	A	A	A	A	A
World Seniors Championship	Tournament Not Held																		A	A	A	A	QF	QF	A	A	A	A	A	A	A	A	
Former ranking tournaments
Asian Classic (Note: The event was called the Dubai Classic (1992/1993–1994/1995) and Thailand Classic (1995/1996))	LQ	LQ	2R	LQ	LQ	Tournament Not Held																											
Malta Grand Prix	Not Held		Non-Ranking Event					1R	NR	Tournament Not Held																							
Thailand Masters (Note: The event was called the Asian Open (1992/1993) and the Thailand Open (1993/1994–1996/1997))	LQ	LQ	LQ	LQ	LQ	LQ	1R	SF	LQ	LQ	NR	Not Held			NR	Tournament Not Held																	
Irish Masters	Non-Ranking Event										LQ	LQ	LQ	NH	NR	Tournament Not Held																	
Northern Ireland Trophy	Tournament Not Held													NR	SF	2R	2R	Tournament Not Held															
Bahrain Championship	Tournament Not Held																QF	Tournament Not Held															
Wuxi Classic (Note: The event was called the Jiangsu Classic (2008/2009–2009/2010))	Tournament Not Held																Non-Ranking Event				1R	1R	LQ	Tournament Not Held									
Australian Goldfields Open (Note: The event was called the Australian Open (1994/1995–1995/1996) and the Australian Masters (1995/1996))	Not Held		Non-Ranking		Tournament Not held															QF	1R	QF	1R	LQ	Tournament Not Held								
Shanghai Masters	Tournament Not Held															W	1R	LQ	LQ	1R	1R	LQ	2R	LQ	LQ	1R	Non-Ranking		Not Held			Non-Ranking	
Paul Hunter Classic (Note: The event was called the Grand Prix Fürth (2004/2005) and the Fürth German Open (2005/2006–2006/2007))	Tournament Not Held												Pro-am Event						Minor-Ranking Event						SF	3R	2R	NR	Tournament Not Held				
Indian Open	Tournament Not Held																					1R	LQ	NH	3R	2R	1R	Tournament Not Held					
China Open (Note: The event was called the China International (1997/1998–1998/1999))	Tournament Not Held					NR	1R	LQ	2R	1R	Not Held		LQ	LQ	LQ	LQ	LQ	LQ	LQ	1R	LQ	2R	2R	3R	LQ	LQ	1R	Tournament Not Held					
Riga Masters (Note: The event was called the Riga Open (2014/2015–2015/2016))	Tournament Not Held																						Minor-Rank		LQ	LQ	LQ	LQ	Tournament Not Held				
China Championship	Tournament Not Held																								NR	LQ	LQ	1R	Tournament Not Held				
WST Pro Series	Tournament Not Held																												2R	Tournament Not Held			
Turkish Masters	Tournament Not Held																													LQ	Not Held		
Gibraltar Open	Tournament Not Held																							MR	1R	3R	2R	1R	1R	1R	Not Held		
WST Classic	Tournament Not Held																														1R	Not Held	
European Masters (Note: The event was called the European Open (1992/1993–1996/1997 and 2001/2002–2003/2004), the Irish Open (1998/1999) and the Malta Cup (2004/2005–2007/2008))	1R	LQ	LQ	LQ	LQ	NH	1R	Not Held		1R	LQ	LQ	LQ	SF	LQ	NR	Tournament Not Held								1R	1R	LQ	LQ	1R	LQ	2R	1R	NH
Former non-ranking tournaments
Malta Masters	Not Held			QF	Tournament Not Held																												
Malaysian Masters	Not Held			W	Tournament Not Held																												
Scottish Masters	A	A	A	A	A	A	A	A	LQ	LQ	LQ	Tournament Not Held																					
Malta Cup	Ranking Event					NH	R	Not Held		Ranking Event						RR	Tournament Not Held																
Masters Qualifying Event (Note: The event was also called the Benson & Hedges Championship (1990/1991–2002/2003))	MR	LQ	3R	1R	1R	3R	4R	3R	4R	2R	3R	F	NH	A	A	1R	A	A	Tournament Not Held														
World Grand Prix	Tournament Not Held																						1R	Ranking Event									
General Cup (Note: The event was called the General Cup International (2004/2005, 2009/2010 and 2011/2012))	Tournament Not Held												F	Tournament Not Held				A	NH	A	A	A	A	A	Tournament Not Held								
Shoot Out	Tournament Not Held																		2R	QF	3R	W	1R	1R	Ranking Event								
Paul Hunter Classic	Tournament Not Held												Pro-am Event						Minor-Ranking Event						Ranking Event			QF	Tournament Not Held				
Six-red World Championship (Note: The event was called the Six-red Snooker International (2008/2009) and the Six-red World Grand Prix (2009/2010))	Tournament Not Held																A	A	A	NH	QF	3R	SF	A	3R	A	A	A	Not Held		A	Not Held	

Performance Table Legend
LQ	lost in the qualifying draw	#R	lost in the early rounds of the tournament (WR = Wildcard round, RR = Round robin)	QF	lost in the quarter-finals
SF	lost in the semi-finals	F	lost in the final	W	won the tournament
DNQ	did not qualify for the tournament	A	did not participate in the tournament	WD	withdrew from the tournament
DQ	disqualified from the tournament				

NH / Not Held	event was not held.
NR / Non-Ranking Event	event is/was no longer a ranking event.
R / Ranking Event	event is/was a ranking event.
MR / Minor-Ranking Event	event is/was a minor-ranking event.

== Career finals ==
=== Ranking finals: 2 (2 titles) ===
Outcome	No.	Year	Championship	Opponent in the final	Score
Winner	1.	1997	Grand Prix	(Scotland) John Higgins	9–6
Winner	2.	2007	Shanghai Masters	(Wales) Ryan Day	10–6

=== Minor-ranking finals: 2 (1 title) ===
Outcome	No.	Year	Championship	Opponent in the final	Score
Winner	1.	2010	Players Tour Championship – Event 6	(England) Martin Gould	4–3
Runner-up	1.	2011	Players Tour Championship – Event 10	(England) Michael Holt	2–4

=== Non-ranking finals: 4 (2 titles) ===
Outcome	No.	Year	Championship	Opponent in the final	Score
Winner	1.	1996	Malaysian Masters	(Scotland) Drew Henry	8–3
Runner-up	1.	2003	Masters Qualifying Event	(Australia) Neil Robertson	5–6
Runner-up	2.	2004	General Cup	(Thailand) Issara Kachaiwong	3–6
Winner	2.	2014	Snooker Shoot Out	(England) Stuart Bingham	1–0

=== Pro-am finals: 7 (6 titles) ===
Outcome	No.	Year	Championship	Opponent in the final	Score
Winner	1.	2004	Liam O'Connor Memorial	(Republic of Ireland) Mario Fernandez	6–1
Winner	2.	2005	Liam O'Connor Memorial (2)	(Wales) Jamie Jones	6–0
Runner-up	1.	2007	Pontins Pro-Am - Event 2	(Republic of Ireland) Leo Fernandez	2–4
Winner	3.	2007	Pontins Pro-Am - Event 5	(England) Stephen Craigie	4–2
Winner	4.	2008	3 Kings Open	(Republic of Ireland) Richard McHugh	5–0
Winner	5.	2010	3 Kings Open (2)	(England) Matthew Couch	5–1
Winner	6.	2011	3 Kings Open (3)	(Malta) Tony Drago	5–1

=== Team finals: 2 (1 title) ===
Outcome	No.	Year	Championship	Team/partner	Opponent(s) in the final	Score
Winner	1.	1999	Nations Cup	Wales	Scotland	6–4
Runner-up	1.	2000	Nations Cup	Wales	England	2–6

=== Amateur finals: 2 (1 title) ===
Outcome	No.	Year	Championship	Opponent in the final	Score
Winner	1.	1991	Welsh Amateur Championship	(Wales) David Bell	8–7
Runner-up	1.	1992	World Amateur Championship	(Thailand) Noppadon Noppachorn	9–11
