= 1999 Nations Cup (snooker) =

Tournament information
- Dates: 16–24 January 1999
- Venue: Telewest Arena
- City: Newcastle upon Tyne
- Country: England
- Organisation: WPBSA
- Format: Non-ranking event
- Total prize fund: £175,000
- Winner's share: £17,500 (×3)

Final
- Champion: Wales: Darren Morgan; Mark Williams; Dominic Dale; Matthew Stevens
- Runner-up: Scotland: John Higgins; Stephen Hendry; Alan McManus; Chris Small
- Score: 6–4

The 1999 Nations Cup was a professional non-ranking snooker team tournament that took place at Telewest Arena in Newcastle upon Tyne, England, from 16 to 24 January 1999. It was the first edition of the Nations Cup. The competition was contested by five nations of four players each. The Wales team of Darren Morgan, Mark Williams, Dominic Dale and Matthew Stevens won the title with a 6–4 victory in the final over the Scotland Team of John Higgins, Stephen Hendry, Alan McManus and Chris Small.

== Background ==
The Nations Cup was created as a five-squad snooker tournament involving the Home Nations. Each nation had a team of four players, consisting of the top three players from the country in the snooker world rankings, and a fourth wild card player selected by the World Professional Billiards and Snooker Association; for four of the teams, this was the fourth-highest ranked player, but for England, Jimmy White, who was the tenth-highest ranked English player in the Snooker world rankings 1998/1999 was selected.

== Tournament summary ==
All teams played each other in a round-robin, with the top two teams qualifying for the finals. England were the pre-tournament bookmakers' favourites to win, but were defeated 3–8 by Scotland in the opening match, and also lost to Northern Ireland and Wales. Scotland won all four of their group matches, and qualified for the final. Wales, with three wins, were the other finalists. Stephen O'Connor of Northern Ireland was the only player not to win a frame during the group phase. Small and McManus, with ten wins from 13 matches each, had the best records from the round-robin.

In the final, Scotland took a 2–0 lead after Higgins won an untidy opening frame against Stevens, and Hendry made a 90 break against Williams. Stevens then won Wales' first frame with a break of 78 against McManus, before Hendry and Small took a lengthy doubles frame against Morgan and Dale. Morgan defeated Small, making a break of 30, and then Stevens compiled a 101 break against Higgins to level the scores at 3–3. Small followed this with a 79 break to defeat, and then Williams put together a break of 74 as he and Stevens beat Higgins and McManus in a doubles frame, bringing the score to 4–4. McManus lost to Williams as Wales took the lead in the match for the first time at 5–4. Stevens had breaks of 41 and 46 in defeating Hendry, meaning Wales won the match 6–4. Small, with twelve wins from sixteen frames played, had the best record in the tournament.

Television coverage of the final was interrupted with the score at 4–4 as ITV switched to coverage of the 1998–99 FA Cup match between Wolverhampton Wanderers and Arsenal. The broadcast of the concluding two frames was limited to one shot from the ninth frame and the 46 break from the last frame, televised after the FA Cup match.

=== Prize fund ===
The breakdown of prize money for the 1999 tournament is listed below. Each player received an equal share of prize money for how well their team fared.

- Winners: £17,500 each
- Runners-up: £10,000 each
- Others: £5,000 each
- Total: £175,000

=== Participants ===
Below is a list of participating teams and players.

Country	Player 1	Player 2	Player 3	Player 4 (wild card)
England	John Parrott (Captain)	Ronnie O'Sullivan	Peter Ebdon	Jimmy White
Northern Ireland	Joe Swail	Terry Murphy	Jason Prince	Dennis Taylor
Republic of Ireland	Ken Doherty	Fergal O'Brien	Michael Judge	Stephen O'Connor
Scotland	John Higgins (Captain)	Stephen Hendry	Alan McManus	Chris Small
Wales	Darren Morgan (Captain)	Dominic Dale	Mark Williams	Matthew Stevens

== Round robin ==
Teams in bold indicate match winners.

Winning team	Score	Losing team
Scotland	**8**–3	England
Wales	**8**–3	Ireland
Northern Ireland	**6**–5	England
Scotland	**8**–3	Wales
Ireland	**6**–5	Northern Ireland
Wales	**6**–5	Northern Ireland
England	**9**–2	Ireland
Scotland	**7**–4	Northern Ireland
Wales	**7**–4	England
Scotland	**9**–2	Ireland

=== Final ===
Match winning players and scores are shown in bold. Breaks over 50 are shown in parentheses.

Final: Best of 11 frames. Telewest Arena, Newcastle upon Tyne, England, 24 January 1999.
Mark Williams; Darren Morgan; Dominic Dale; Matthew Stevens; **Wales**	**6**–4	Stephen Hendry; Alan McManus; John Higgins; Chris Small; Scotland
Stevens 6–**66 Higgins**; Williams 0–**93** (90) **Hendry**; **Stevens** (78) **78**–6 McManus; Morgan/Dale 20–**62 Hendry/Small**; **Morgan 91**–34 Small; **Williams** (101) **101**–22 Higgins; Dale 0–**79** (79) **Small**; **Stevens/Williams** (Williams 74) **75**–20 Higgins/McManus; **Williams 82**–20 McManus; **Stevens 88**–1 Hendry
