= 2000 China Open (snooker) =

Mission Hills China Open
Tournament information
- Dates: 9–17 December 2000
- Venue: Mission Hills Resort
- City: Shenzhen
- Country: China
- Organisation: WPBSA
- Format: Ranking event
- Total prize fund: £311,000
- Winner's share: £50,000

Final
- Champion: Ronnie O'Sullivan (ENG)
- Runner-up: Mark Williams (WAL)
- Score: 9–3

The 2000 Mission Hills China Open was a professional ranking snooker tournament that took place from 9–17 December 2000 at the Mission Hills Resort in Shenzhen, China. It was the fourth ranking event of the 2000/2001 season.

The reigning champion was Ronnie O'Sullivan, who retained his title by defeating Mark Williams in the final 9–3.

== Prize fund ==
The breakdown of prize money for this year is shown below:

- Winner: £50,000
- Runner-up: £26,000
- Semi-finalists: £13,000
- Quarter-finalists: £7,250
- Last 16: £3,910
- Last 32: £3,400
- Last 48: £1,500
- Last 64: £1,250
- Last 96: £950
- Last 128: £500
- Highest break (televised): £3,000
- Highest break (untelevised): £1,000
- Total: £311,000

== Wildcard round ==
Match		Score	
WC1	Bjorn Haneveer (BEL)	5–3	Cai Jianzhong (CHN)
WC2	Stephen Maguire (SCO)	5–1	Pang Weiguo (CHN)

== Main draw ==
Last 32; Best of 9 frames
(England) Ronnie O'Sullivan	5
(Scotland) Billy Snaddon	4
(Wales) Dominic Dale	5
(Republic of Ireland) Fergal O'Brien	1
(England) Paul Hunter	5
(England) Michael Holt	0
(Republic of Ireland) Ken Doherty	5
(Republic of Ireland) Michael Judge	2
(Scotland) Stephen Hendry	5
(Belgium) Bjorn Haneveer	3
(England) Peter Ebdon	5
(England) David Gray	2
(Scotland) Alan McManus	5
(England) Steve Davis	4
(Hong Kong) Marco Fu	5
(England) Mark King	2
(Wales) Mark Williams	5
(Scotland) Marcus Campbell	2
(England) Nigel Bond	5
(England) Anthony Hamilton	4
(England) Stephen Lee	5
(England) Ian McCulloch	4
(England) Jimmy White	5
(Northern Ireland) Joe Swail	4
(Scotland) Drew Henry	5
(England) Dave Harold	4
(England) Bradley Jones	5
(Scotland) John Higgins	2
(Wales) Matthew Stevens	5
(Scotland) Graeme Dott	2
(England) John Parrott	5
(Scotland) Stephen Maguire	0

Last 16; Best of 9 frames
(England) Ronnie O'Sullivan	5
(Wales) Dominic Dale	2
(England) Paul Hunter	5
(Republic of Ireland) Ken Doherty	0
(Scotland) Stephen Hendry	5
(England) Peter Ebdon	2
(Scotland) Alan McManus	5
(Hong Kong) Marco Fu	3
(Wales) Mark Williams	5
(England) Nigel Bond	2
(England) Stephen Lee	5
(England) Jimmy White	1
(Scotland) Drew Henry	5
(England) Bradley Jones	3
(Wales) Matthew Stevens	5
(England) John Parrott	3

Quarter-finals; Best of 9 frames
(England) Ronnie O'Sullivan	5
(England) Paul Hunter	4
(Scotland) Stephen Hendry	5
(Scotland) Alan McManus	2
(Wales) Mark Williams	5
(England) Stephen Lee	3
(Scotland) Drew Henry	5
(Wales) Matthew Stevens	0

Semi-finals; Best of 11 frames
(England) Ronnie O'Sullivan	6
(Scotland) Stephen Hendry	3
(Wales) Mark Williams	6
(Scotland) Drew Henry	5

Final; Best of 17 frames
(England) Ronnie O'Sullivan	9
(Wales) Mark Williams	3

== Final ==
Final: Best of 17 frames Mission Hills Resort, Shenzhen, China, 17 December 2000.
Ronnie O'Sullivan; England	9–3	Mark Williams; Wales
Afternoon: 77–11 (70), 7–71 (63), 68–60 (O'Sullivan 54), 103–9 (76), 68–53, 87–0 (87), 92–9 (63), 74–18 (74); Evening: 59–63, 35–70 (65), 75–43 (68), 99–6 (54)
87	Highest break	65
0	Century breaks	0
8	50+ breaks	2
