= 2000–01 snooker season =

Series of snooker tournaments

Details
- Duration: 26 August 2000 – 13 May 2001
- Tournaments: 20 (8 ranking events)

Triple Crown winners
- UK Championship: (Scotland) John Higgins
- Masters: (England) Paul Hunter
- World Championship: (England) Ronnie O'Sullivan

The 2000–01 snooker season was a series of snooker tournaments played between 26 August 2000 and 13 May 2001. The following table outlines the results for the ranking and invitational events.

== Calendar ==
=== World Snooker Tour ===
Start	Finish	Country	Tournament name	Venue	City	Winner	Runner-up	Score	Ref.
26 Aug	3 Sep	ENG	Champions Cup	Brighton Centre	Brighton	(England) Ronnie O'Sullivan	(Wales) Mark Williams	7–5	
1 Oct	8 Oct	ENG	British Open	Plymouth Pavilions	Plymouth	(England) Peter Ebdon	(England) Jimmy White	9–6	
13 Oct	22 Oct	ENG	Grand Prix	Telford International Centre	Telford	(Wales) Mark Williams	(England) Ronnie O'Sullivan	9–5	
24 Oct	29 Oct	SCO	Scottish Masters	Civic Centre	Motherwell	(England) Ronnie O'Sullivan	(Scotland) Stephen Hendry	9–6	
5 Nov	16 Nov	ENG	Benson & Hedges Championship	Willie Thorne Snooker Centre	Malvern	(England) Shaun Murphy	(England) Stuart Bingham	9–7	
18 Nov	3 Dec	ENG	UK Championship	Bournemouth International Centre	Bournemouth	(Scotland) John Higgins	(Wales) Mark Williams	10–4	
9 Dec	17 Dec	CHN	China Open	Mission Hills Resort	Shenzhen	(England) Ronnie O'Sullivan	(Wales) Mark Williams	9–3	
13 Jan	21 Jan	ENG	Nations Cup	The Hexagon	Reading	Scotland	Ireland	6–2	
24 Jan	28 Jan	WAL	Welsh Open	Cardiff International Arena	Cardiff	(Republic of Ireland) Ken Doherty	(England) Paul Hunter	9–2	
4 Feb	11 Feb	ENG	Masters	Wembley Conference Centre	London	(England) Paul Hunter	(Republic of Ireland) Fergal O'Brien	10–9	
21 Feb	25 Feb	MLT	Malta Grand Prix	Mediterranean Conference Centre	Valletta	(Scotland) Stephen Hendry	(Wales) Mark Williams	7–1	
11 Mar	17 Mar	THA	Thailand Masters	Mercahant Court Hotel	Bangkok	(Republic of Ireland) Ken Doherty	(Scotland) Stephen Hendry	9–3	
27 Mar	1 Apr	IRL	Irish Masters	Citywest Hotel	Dublin	(England) Ronnie O'Sullivan	(Scotland) Stephen Hendry	9–8	
8 Apr	15 Apr	SCO	Scottish Open	A.E.C.C.	Aberdeen	(England) Peter Ebdon	(Republic of Ireland) Ken Doherty	9–7	
21 Apr	7 May	ENG	World Snooker Championship	Crucible Theatre	Sheffield	(England) Ronnie O'Sullivan	(Scotland) John Higgins	18–14	
6 Jan	13 May	SCO	Premier League	Inverness Leisure Centre	Inverness	(England) Ronnie O'Sullivan	(Scotland) Stephen Hendry	9–7	

Ranking event
Non-ranking event

=== Challenge Tour ===
Start	Finish	Country	Tournament name	Venue	City	Winner	Runner-up	Score	Ref.
31 Oct	2 Nov	ENG	Challenge Tour 1	Jesters Snooker Club	Swindon	(England) Adrian Rosa	(England) Surinder Gill	6–4	
18 Dec	20 Dec	ENG	Challenge Tour 2	Manhattan Club and Snooker Centre	Harrogate	(England) Andrew Norman	(England) Luke Fisher	6–3	
9 Mar	11 Mar	ENG	Challenge Tour 3	Jesters Snooker Club	Swindon	(England) Shaun Murphy	(England) Andrew Norman	6–3	
4 Apr	6 Apr	ENG	Challenge Tour 4	Manhattan Club and Snooker Centre	Harrogate	(England) Shaun Murphy	(England) Luke Simmonds	6–2	

== Official rankings ==
The top 16 of the world rankings, these players automatically played in the final rounds of the world ranking events and were invited for the Masters.

No.	Ch.	Player	Points 1998/1999	Points 1999/2000	Total
1	▲	(Wales) Mark Williams	25445	31655	57100
2	▼	(Scotland) John Higgins	22755	21690	44445
3	▼	(Scotland) Stephen Hendry	24445	18125	42570
4	Steady	(England) Ronnie O'Sullivan	12440	20200	32640
5	▲	(England) Stephen Lee	15625	15980	31605
6	▲	(Wales) Matthew Stevens	13100	18005	31105
7	Steady	(Republic of Ireland) Ken Doherty	12995	16260	29255
8	Steady	(Scotland) Alan McManus	15760	9750	25510
9	▲	(Republic of Ireland) Fergal O'Brien	13667	11035	24702
10	▼	(England) John Parrott	14665	9400	24065
11	▼	(England) Anthony Hamilton	12255	11260	23515
12	▲	(England) Peter Ebdon	11470	11885	23355
13	▲	(England) Dave Harold	10885	11852	22737
14	▼	(England) Paul Hunter	12422	10075	22497
15	▲	(Hong Kong) Marco Fu	10372	11957	22329
16	▲	(Northern Ireland) Joe Swail	8835	12755	21590
