= 2007–08 snooker world ranking points =

| Preceded by 2006/2007 | 2007/2008 | Succeeded by 2008/2009 |

Snooker world rankings 2007/2008: The official world ranking points for the 96 professional snooker players in the 2007–08 season are listed below. The total points from the seasons 2006–07 and 2007–08 were used to determine the rankings for the season 2008/2009.

== Ranking points ==
| No. | Ch | Player | Points 2006/07 | SM | GP | NI | UK | WO | CO | WSC | Points 2007/08 | Total |
|---|---|---|---|---|---|---|---|---|---|---|---|---|
| 1 | ▲4 | (England) Ronnie O'Sullivan | 20750 | 700 | 5000 | 2500 | 7500 | 4000 | 0 | 10000 | 29700 | 50450 |
| 2 | ▲8 | (Scotland) Stephen Maguire | 19550 | 1900 | 2375 | 5000 | 6000 | 700 | 5000 | 5000 | 25975 | 45525 |
| 3 | | (England) Shaun Murphy | 21350 | 700 | 4000 | 3200 | 4800 | 3200 | 4000 | 3800 | 23700 | 45050 |
| 4 | ▲7 | (England) Mark Selby | 18275 | 3200 | 1750 | 700 | 4800 | 5000 | 3200 | 1400 | 20050 | 38325 |
| 5 | ▼4 | (Scotland) John Higgins | 23100 | 1900 | 2375 | 700 | 1050 | 2500 | 2500 | 3800 | 14825 | 37925 |
| 6 | ▲2 | (Scotland) Stephen Hendry | 17375 | 1900 | 1750 | 1900 | 1050 | 3200 | 700 | 6400 | 16900 | 34275 |
| 7 | ▲7 | (England) Ali Carter | 15750 | 700 | 2375 | 1900 | 1050 | 2500 | 1900 | 8000 | 18425 | 34175 |
| 8 | ▲8 | (Wales) Ryan Day | 14450 | 4000 | 2375 | 1900 | 1050 | 1900 | 3200 | 5000 | 19425 | 33875 |
| 9 | ▼3 | (England) Peter Ebdon | 18000 | 700 | 3125 | 2500 | 1050 | 700 | 1900 | 5000 | 14975 | 32975 |
| 10 | ▼3 | (Australia) Neil Robertson | 20550 | 700 | 1750 | 2500 | 1050 | 1900 | 700 | 3800 | 12400 | 32950 |
| 11 | ▼2 | (China) Ding Junhui | 16325 | 1900 | 719 | 1900 | 3750 | 1900 | 1900 | 3800 | 15869 | 32194 |
| 12 | ▲6 | (England) Joe Perry | 12175 | 575 | 3125 | 1400 | 2850 | 2500 | 1400 | 6400 | 18250 | 30425 |
| 13 | ▼11 | (Scotland) Graeme Dott | 18675 | 3200 | 719 | 700 | 1050 | 700 | 700 | 1400 | 8469 | 27144 |
| 14 | ▲13 | (Hong Kong) Marco Fu | 8925 | 1400 | 6250 | 575 | 3750 | 1400 | 1900 | 2800 | 18075 | 27000 |
| 15 | ▲6 | (England) Mark King | 12325 | 575 | 1750 | 1400 | 2850 | 1400 | 1900 | 3800 | 13675 | 26000 |
| 16 | ▲13 | (Northern Ireland) Mark Allen | 10650 | 575 | 1750 | 3200 | 2850 | 1400 | 2500 | 2800 | 15075 | 25725 |
| 17 | ▲3 | (Wales) Matthew Stevens | 14950 | 2500 | 1750 | 575 | 863 | 575 | 1400 | 2800 | 10463 | 25413 |
| 18 | ▼14 | (Republic of Ireland) Ken Doherty | 15550 | 700 | 719 | 1900 | 1050 | 1900 | 1900 | 1400 | 9569 | 25119 |
| 19 | ▲3 | (England) Jamie Cope | 11875 | 1400 | 719 | 1400 | 3750 | 1400 | 1400 | 2800 | 12869 | 24744 |
| 20 | ▼3 | (Northern Ireland) Joe Swail | 11750 | 575 | 3125 | 1400 | 2100 | 575 | 1400 | 3800 | 12975 | 24725 |
| 21 | ▲2 | (England) Stuart Bingham | 9850 | 2500 | 1750 | 575 | 2850 | 1900 | 1400 | 3800 | 14775 | 24625 |
| 22 | ▼10 | (Wales) Mark Williams | 8825 | 700 | 1750 | 700 | 3750 | 1900 | 2500 | 3800 | 15100 | 23925 |
| 23 | ▲2 | (England) Nigel Bond | 10338 | 1400 | 1750 | 1400 | 2850 | 575 | 2500 | 2800 | 13275 | 23613 |
| 24 | ▲13 | (Republic of Ireland) Fergal O'Brien | 9825 | 1400 | 1438 | 4000 | 1725 | 450 | 1400 | 2300 | 12713 | 22538 |
| 25 | ▲3 | (England) Ian McCulloch | 11938 | 1900 | 719 | 1900 | 2850 | 1400 | 575 | 1150 | 10494 | 22432 |
| 26 | ▼13 | (England) Stephen Lee | 12650 | 2500 | 719 | 700 | 1050 | 2500 | 700 | 1400 | 9569 | 22219 |
| 27 | ▼8 | (England) Barry Hawkins | 9150 | 575 | 2375 | 1900 | 2850 | 575 | 1900 | 2800 | 12975 | 22125 |
| 28 | ▲2 | (England) Dave Harold | 9250 | 2500 | 719 | 575 | 2850 | 1400 | 1400 | 2800 | 12244 | 21494 |
| 29 | ▼14 | (England) Steve Davis | 11850 | 1900 | 719 | 1900 | 1050 | 1900 | 700 | 1400 | 9569 | 21419 |
| 30 | ▲4 | (Republic of Ireland) Michael Judge | 10075 | 1400 | 2375 | 1150 | 675 | 1900 | 450 | 2800 | 10750 | 20825 |
| 31 | ▼5 | (England) Anthony Hamilton | 11038 | 575 | 1750 | 1400 | 2100 | 575 | 575 | 2800 | 9775 | 20813 |
| 32 | ▼1 | (Wales) Dominic Dale | 9375 | 5000 | 1750 | 1400 | 863 | 575 | 575 | 1150 | 11313 | 20688 |
| 33 | ▼1 | (Northern Ireland) Gerard Greene | 9300 | 575 | 4000 | 2500 | 863 | 575 | 575 | 1150 | 10238 | 19538 |
| 34 | ▼10 | (England) Michael Holt | 10338 | 1400 | 1750 | 575 | 2100 | 1400 | 575 | 1150 | 8950 | 19288 |
| 35 | ▲1 | (England) Ricky Walden | 8750 | 1150 | 2375 | 450 | 2100 | 450 | 1400 | 2300 | 10225 | 18975 |
| 36 | ▲4 | (England) Adrian Gunnell | 8825 | 1900 | 250 | 1400 | 2100 | 1150 | 450 | 2300 | 9550 | 18375 |
| 37 | ▲1 | (Scotland) Alan McManus | 10325 | 1150 | 813 | 1150 | 675 | 1400 | 450 | 2300 | 7938 | 18263 |
| 38 | ▲6 | (England) Andrew Higginson | 10625 | 450 | 813 | 450 | 1725 | 1400 | 1150 | 900 | 6888 | 17513 |
| 39 | | (England) John Parrott | 9625 | 1150 | 250 | 1150 | 675 | 1150 | 1150 | 2300 | 7825 | 17450 |
| 40 | ▲26 | (China) Liang Wenbo | 6775 | 1150 | 1125 | 1150 | 975 | 900 | 200 | 5000 | 10500 | 17275 |
| 41 | ▲10 | (England) Judd Trump | 8650 | 900 | 813 | 900 | 488 | 1400 | 900 | 2300 | 7701 | 16351 |
| 42 | ▲10 | (Scotland) Marcus Campbell | 8125 | 325 | 2375 | 325 | 1725 | 1400 | 1400 | 650 | 8200 | 16325 |
| 43 | ▲2 | (England) David Gilbert | 8575 | 1150 | 1125 | 1150 | 1725 | 1150 | 450 | 900 | 7650 | 16225 |
| 44 | ▲4 | (England) Rory McLeod | 8200 | 1150 | 1750 | 450 | 675 | 450 | 1150 | 2300 | 7925 | 16125 |
| 45 | ▲1 | (Scotland) Jamie Burnett | 9375 | 450 | 813 | 1150 | 1725 | 450 | 1150 | 900 | 6638 | 16013 |
| 46 | ▲15 | (England) Jimmy Michie | 7575 | 325 | 1750 | 325 | 1725 | 1150 | 900 | 1800 | 7975 | 15550 |
| 47 | ▲12 | (England) Mike Dunn | 7050 | 1400 | 813 | 1150 | 488 | 900 | 1400 | 2300 | 8451 | 15501 |
| 48 | ▲2 | (England) Tom Ford | 7175 | 325 | 1750 | 1400 | 1725 | 900 | 900 | 650 | 7650 | 14825 |
| 49 | ▼14 | (England) David Gray | 7450 | 1150 | 813 | 1400 | 1725 | 450 | 450 | 900 | 6888 | 14338 |
| 50 | ▲6 | (England) Barry Pinches | 5075 | 900 | 1125 | 900 | 1725 | 325 | 1900 | 2300 | 9175 | 14250 |
| 51 | ▼4 | (England) Robert Milkins | 7863 | 450 | 1125 | 450 | 1725 | 450 | 1150 | 900 | 6250 | 14113 |
| 52 | ▲3 | (England) David Roe | 5738 | 1150 | 1125 | 325 | 1350 | 1400 | 1150 | 1800 | 8300 | 14038 |
| 53 | ▲19 | (China) Liu Song | 5425 | 0 | 3125 | 1150 | 1350 | 650 | 900 | 1300 | 8475 | 13900 |
| 54 | ▼12 | (England) Andrew Norman | 8288 | 450 | 1438 | 450 | 675 | 1150 | 450 | 900 | 5513 | 13801 |
| 55 | ▲9 | (Wales) Ian Preece | 6950 | 325 | 1125 | 325 | 1725 | 900 | 325 | 1800 | 6525 | 13475 |
| 56 | ▼15 | (England) Andy Hicks | 7363 | 450 | 1125 | 450 | 675 | 450 | 450 | 2300 | 5900 | 13263 |
| 57 | ▲5 | (Wales) Paul Davies | 6213 | 900 | 1438 | 325 | 2100 | 325 | 1150 | 650 | 6888 | 13101 |
| 58 | ▼15 | (England) Mark Davis | 6375 | 450 | 1438 | 450 | 675 | 450 | 450 | 2800 | 6713 | 13088 |
| 59 | ▲14 | (England) Mark Joyce | 5400 | 900 | 1438 | 650 | 1725 | 900 | 650 | 1300 | 7563 | 12963 |
| 60 | ▼11 | (England) Rod Lawler | 7800 | 900 | 250 | 1150 | 488 | 1150 | 325 | 650 | 4913 | 12713 |
| 61 | ▼3 | (Republic of Ireland) Joe Delaney | 7425 | 900 | 1438 | 325 | 488 | 1150 | 325 | 650 | 5276 | 12701 |
| 62 | ▼9 | (England) Stuart Pettman | 5313 | 1900 | 1750 | 325 | 488 | 900 | 1150 | 650 | 7163 | 12476 |
| 63 | New entry | (England) Martin Gould | 5400 (Note: Starter points given to new players on the tour.) | 200 | 813 | 1400 | 1350 | 650 | 200 | 1800 | 6413 | 11813 |
| 64 | ▲7 | (Republic of Ireland) David Morris | 5500 | 650 | 813 | 900 | 1725 | 650 | 900 | 400 | 6038 | 11538 |
| 65 | ▼5 | (England) Jimmy White | 5725 | 325 | 1125 | 325 | 488 | 900 | 325 | 2300 | 5788 | 11513 |
| 66 | ▼33 | (Thailand) James Wattana | 6538 | 450 | 813 | 1150 | 675 | 450 | 450 | 900 | 4888 | 11426 |
| 67 | ▲2 | (China) Tian Pengfei | 6125 | 0 | 1438 | 200 | 300 | 1400 | 200 | 1300 | 4838 | 10963 |
| 68 | ▼3 | (England) Lee Spick | 5600 | 650 | 250 | 900 | 1350 | 650 | 1150 | 400 | 5350 | 10950 |
| 69 | ▼3 | (England) Joe Jogia | 5688 | 1150 | 1125 | 200 | 1350 | 200 | 650 | 400 | 5075 | 10763 |
| 70 | ▼8 | (Scotland) Scott MacKenzie | 5275 | 1400 | 250 | 325 | 488 | 325 | 325 | 2300 | 5413 | 10688 |
| 71 | New entry | (England) Matthew Selt | 5400 | 200 | 813 | 200 | 975 | 1150 | 650 | 1300 | 5288 | 10688 |
| 72 | New entry | (Northern Ireland) Patrick Wallace | 5400 | 650 | 1125 | 900 | 1350 | 650 | 200 | 400 | 5275 | 10675 |
| 73 | ▼15 | (Finland) Robin Hull | 6775 | 325 | 1125 | 900 | 488 (Note: Robin Hull has retired from the WSA Main Tour.) | 450 | 200 | 400 | 3888 | 10663 |
| 74 | ▼6 | (Malta) Tony Drago | 5925 | 1400 | 1125 | 200 | 300 | 650 | 650 | 400 | 4725 | 10650 |
| 75 | ▼18 | (Scotland) Drew Henry | 5675 | 325 | 250 | 900 | 488 | 1150 | 1150 | 650 | 4913 | 10588 |
| 76 | New entry | (Republic of Ireland) Rodney Goggins | 5400 | 200 | 813 | 650 | 1350 | 650 | 200 | 1300 | 5163 | 10563 |
| 77 | New entry | (Scotland) James McBain | 5400 | 200 | 1125 | 200 | 975 | 200 | 650 | 1800 | 5150 | 10550 |
| 78 | New entry | (Thailand) Supoj Saenla | 5400 | 900 | 813 | 200 | 975 | 200 | 200 | 1800 | 5088 | 10488 |
| 79 | New entry | (Republic of Ireland) Leo Fernandez | 5400 | 650 | 250 | 200 | 300 | 650 | 900 | 1800 | 4750 | 10150 |
| 80 | New entry | (England) Jamie O'Neill | 5400 | 900 | 250 | 900 | 975 | 650 | 650 | 400 | 4725 | 10125 |
| 81 | New entry | (China) Liu Chuang | 5400 | 0 | 250 | 200 | 300 | 200 | 900 | 2800 | 4650 | 10050 |
| 82 | New entry | (Norway) Kurt Maflin | 5400 | 200 | 250 | 650 | 975 | 650 | 1150 | 400 | 4275 | 9675 |
| 83 | ▼9 | (England) Alfie Burden | 5400 | 900 | 813 | 200 | 975 | 650 | 200 | 400 | 4138 | 9538 |
| 84 | New entry | (China) Xiao Guodong | 5400 | 0 | 1125 | 900 | 300 | 200 | 200 | 1300 | 4025 | 9425 |
| 85 | New entry | (Wales) Lee Walker | 5400 | 650 | 813 | 1150 | 300 | 200 | 200 | 400 | 3713 | 9113 |
| 86 | New entry | (England) Munraj Pal | 5400 | 200 | 1125 | 200 | 1350 | 200 | 200 | 400 | 3675 | 9075 |
| 87 | New entry | (Wales) Gareth Coppack | 5400 | 650 | 250 | 200 | 300 | 200 | 200 | 1800 | 3600 | 9000 |
| 88 | New entry | (England) Alex Davies | 5400 | 200 | 250 | 200 | 300 | 650 | 650 | 1300 | 3550 | 8950 |
| 89 | ▼10 | (Thailand) Issara Kachaiwong | 4475 | 0 | 813 | 650 | 300 | 200 | 650 | 1800 | 4413 | 8888 |
| 90 | New entry | (Wales) Michael White | 5400 | 0 | 250 | 650 | 300 | 200 | 650 | 1300 | 3350 | 8750 |
| 91 | New entry | (England) Jimmy Robertson | 5400 | 650 | 813 | 650 | 300 | 200 | 200 | 400 | 3213 | 8613 |
| 92 | ▼17 | (England) Ben Woollaston | 4975 | 200 | 1438 | 650 | 300 | 200 | 200 | 400 | 3388 | 8363 |
| 93 | New entry | (Scotland) Fraser Patrick | 5400 | 200 | 1125 | 200 | 300 | 200 | 200 | 400 | 2625 | 8025 |
| 94 | New entry | (Australia) Steve Mifsud | 5400 | 200 | 250 | 200 | 300 | 200 | 650 | 400 | 2200 | 7600 |
| 95 | New entry | (Belgium) Kevin Van Hove | 5400 | 650 | 250 | 200 | 300 | 200 | 200 | 400 | 2200 | 7600 |
| 96 | New entry | (England) Ashley Wright | 5400 | 200 | 250 | 200 | 300 | 200 | 200 | 400 | 1750 | 7150 |
