= Pro Challenge Series =

Series of snooker tournaments

Details
- Duration: 28 July 2009 – 18 February 2010
- Tournaments: 4

The Pro Challenge Series was a series of non-ranking snooker tournaments held during the 2009–10 snooker season. The events were open to all players on the main tour and were intended to give tour players more playing opportunities. Seven events were planned but only four took place before the series was cancelled, due to low player participation. The series was not repeated and was replaced by the Players Tour Championship, which started the following season.

== Prize fund ==
Except for event 2, events had a prize fund of £15,000 with the winner receiving £5,000. Event 2, which was played using the six-red format, had a prize fund of £10,000 with the winner receiving £3,000. In event 2 the £500 break prize went to the player with the fastest maximum break.

== Schedule ==
The schedule for the Events 1 to 5 is listed below. Event 4 was cancelled and event 5 was the final tournament played. Event 2 was played using the six-red format. Events 6 and 7 were cancelled.

Date		Country	Tournament	Reds	Venue	City	Winner	Runner-up	Score	Ref.
28 Jul	30 Jul	ENG	Event 1	15	Northern Snooker Centre	Leeds	Stephen Maguire (SCO)	Alan McManus (SCO)	5–2	
31 Aug	1 Sep	WAL	Event 2	6	Pontins	Prestatyn	Ken Doherty (IRL)	Martin Gould (ENG)	6–2	
9 Nov	11 Nov	ENG	Event 3	15	Willie Thorne Snooker Centre	Leicester	Robert Milkins (ENG)	Joe Jogia (ENG)	5–3	
			Event 4	Tournament was Cancelled						
16 Feb	18 Feb	ENG	Event 5	15	George Scott Snooker Club	Liverpool	Barry Hawkins (ENG)	Michael Holt (ENG)	5–1	

== Event 1 ==
=== Prize fund ===
- Winner: £5,000
- Runner-up: £2,500
- Semi-final: £1,500
- Quarter-final: £500
- Last 16: £250
- High break: £500

The first event took place at the Northern Snooker Centre in Leeds, from 28 to 30 July 2009. Stephen Maguire beat Alan McManus 5–2 in the final. Dave Harold made the highest break of 128. Results are given below.

Last 32; Best of 7 frames
Tony Drago (MLT)	1
Robert Milkins (ENG)	4
Barry Pinches (ENG)	2
Matthew Selt (ENG)	4
Judd Trump (ENG)	3
Mark Joyce (ENG)	4
Alan McManus (SCO)	4
Matthew Couch (ENG)	2
Chris Norbury (ENG)	2
Andrew Norman (ENG)	4
Sam Baird (ENG)	4
Jamie Cope (ENG)	3
Joe Swail (NIR)	4
Gerard Greene (NIR)	1
Jimmy Michie (ENG)	1
Ken Doherty (IRL)	4
Simon Bedford (ENG)	2
Michael Holt (ENG)	4
Ben Woollaston (ENG)	w/o
Stephen Lee (ENG)	w/d
Jimmy Robertson (ENG)	4
Andrew Higginson (ENG)	2
Daniel Wells (WAL)	0
Ricky Walden (ENG)	4
Jordan Brown (NIR)	0
Craig Steadman (ENG)	4
Rod Lawler (ENG)	3
Stephen Maguire (SCO)	4
Tom Ford (ENG)	3
Peter Lines (ENG)	4
Dave Harold (ENG)	4
Stuart Bingham (ENG)	2

Last 16; Best of 7 frames
(England) Robert Milkins	2
(England) Matthew Selt	4
(England) Mark Joyce	0
(Scotland) Alan McManus	4
(England) Andrew Norman	4
(England) Sam Baird	3
(Northern Ireland) Joe Swail	0
(Republic of Ireland) Ken Doherty	4
(England) Michael Holt	1
(England) Ben Woollaston	4
(England) Jimmy Robertson	3
(England) Ricky Walden	4
(England) Craig Steadman	1
(Scotland) Stephen Maguire	4
(England) Peter Lines	1
(England) Dave Harold	4

Quarter-finals; Best of 7 frames
(England) Matthew Selt	1
(Scotland) Alan McManus	4
(England) Andrew Norman	0
(Republic of Ireland) Ken Doherty	4
(England) Ben Woollaston	4
(England) Ricky Walden	1
(Scotland) Stephen Maguire	4
(England) Dave Harold	3

Semi-finals; Best of 9 frames
(Scotland) Alan McManus	5
(Republic of Ireland) Ken Doherty	2
(England) Ben Woollaston	2
(Scotland) Stephen Maguire	5

Final; Best of 9 frames
(Scotland) Alan McManus	2
(Scotland) Stephen Maguire	5

=== Preliminary round ===
- Fergal O'Brien (IRL) 0–4 Robert Milkins (ENG)
- Mark Boyle (SCO) 2–4 Matthew Selt (ENG)
- Marcus Campbell (SCO) 3–4 Andrew Norman (ENG)
- Gerard Greene (NIR) 4–0 Graeme Dott (SCO)
- Ken Doherty (IRL) w/o–w/d Jimmy White (ENG)
- Andrew Higginson (ENG) 4–1 Lee Spick (ENG)
- Bjorn Haneveer (BEL) 1–4 Ricky Walden (ENG)
- Mark Davis (ENG) 3–4 Stephen Maguire (SCO)

=== Century breaks ===
- 128 – Dave Harold
- 127 – Ken Doherty
- 126 – Andrew Norman
- 115 – Ricky Walden
- 107 – Mark Boyle
- 107 – Stephen Maguire
- 106 – Matthew Couch
- 100 – Tom Ford
- 100 – Joe Swail

== Event 2 ==
=== Prize fund ===
- Winner: £3,000
- Runner-up: £1,500
- Semi-finals: £800
- Quarter-Finals: £400
- Last 16: £225
- Fastest maximum break (x75): £500

The second event took place at Pontins, Prestatyn, on 31 August and 1 September 2009, using the six-red format. Ken Doherty beat Martin Gould 6–2 in the final. Stuart Pettman took the prize for the fastest maximum break. Results are given below.

Last 32; Best of 9 frames
Marcus Campbell (SCO)	5
Barry Pinches (ENG)	1
Jamie Cope (ENG)	5
Mark Boyle (SCO)	3
Ian Preece (WAL)	w/d
Ben Woollaston (ENG)	w/o
Ken Doherty (IRL)	5
Sam Baird (ENG)	1
Jimmy Michie (ENG)	5
Stuart Pettman (ENG)	3
David Gray (ENG)	w/d
Jordan Brown (NIR)	w/o
Atthasit Mahitthi (THA)	5
Joe Swail (NIR)	2
Mark King (ENG)	2
Rod Lawler (ENG)	5
Simon Bedford (ENG)	2
Matthew Selt (ENG)	5
Martin Gould (ENG)	5
Stephen Lee (ENG)	0
Joe Jogia (ENG)	4
Fergal O'Brien (IRL)	5
Andrew Higginson (ENG)	3
Robert Milkins (ENG)	5
Daniel Wells (WAL)	4
Anthony Hamilton (ENG)	5
Ricky Walden (ENG)	4
Andrew Norman (ENG)	5
James Wattana (THA)	2
Ryan Day (WAL)	5
Tom Ford (ENG)	5
Judd Trump (ENG)	4

Last 16; Best of 9 frames
(Scotland) Marcus Campbell	5
(England) Jamie Cope	2
(England) Ben Woollaston	3
(Republic of Ireland) Ken Doherty	5
(England) Jimmy Michie	5
(Northern Ireland) Jordan Brown	2
(Thailand) Atthasit Mahitthi	5
(England) Rod Lawler	2
(England) Matthew Selt	0
(England) Martin Gould	5
(Republic of Ireland) Fergal O'Brien	5
(England) Robert Milkins	1
(England) Anthony Hamilton	5
(England) Andrew Norman	2
(Wales) Ryan Day	5
(England) Tom Ford	0

Quarter-finals; Best of 9 frames
(Scotland) Marcus Campbell	0
(Republic of Ireland) Ken Doherty	5
(England) Jimmy Michie	1
(Thailand) Atthasit Mahitthi	5
(England) Martin Gould	5
(Republic of Ireland) Fergal O'Brien	1
(England) Anthony Hamilton	5
(Wales) Ryan Day	1

Semi-finals; Best of 11 frames
(Republic of Ireland) Ken Doherty	6
(Thailand) Atthasit Mahitthi	1
(England) Martin Gould	6
(England) Anthony Hamilton	5

Final; Best of 11 frames
(Republic of Ireland) Ken Doherty	6
(England) Martin Gould	2

=== Preliminary round ===
- Craig Steadman (ENG) 2–5 Barry Pinches (ENG)
- Stuart Bingham (ENG) 4–5 Mark Boyle (SCO)
- Thepchaiya Un-Nooh (THA) 3–5 Ben Woollaston (ENG)
- Sam Baird (ENG) w/o-w/d Jimmy White (ENG)
- Matthew Couch (ENG) 2–5 Jordan Brown (NIR)
- Joe Swail (NIR) 5–2 Noppadol Sangnil (THA)
- Rod Lawler (ENG) 5–0 Mark Joyce (ENG)
- Joe Delaney (IRL) w/d–w/o Matthew Selt (ENG)
- Dave Harold (ENG) 4–5 Stephen Lee (ENG)
- Ian McCulloch (ENG) 4–5 Fergal O'Brien (IRL)
- Michael Holt (ENG) 1–5 Robert Milkins (ENG)
- Jimmy Robertson (ENG) 4–5 Anthony Hamilton (ENG)
- Mike Dunn (ENG) 1–5 Andrew Norman (ENG)
- Peter Lines (ENG) 3–5 Ryan Day (WAL)
- Chris Norbury (ENG) 2–5 Judd Trump (ENG)

=== Maximum breaks ===
Note: a maximum break in six-red snooker is 75 points.

- Stuart Pettman (2 min 31 sec)
- Dave Harold (3 min 16 sec)
- Fergal O'Brien (4 min 30 sec)
- Ryan Day (no time)

== Event 3 ==
=== Prize fund ===
- Winner: £5,000
- Runner-up: £2,500
- Semi-final: £1,500
- Quarter-final: £500
- Last 16: £250
- High break: £500

The third event took place at the Willie Thorne Snooker Centre in Leicester, from 9 to 11 November 2009. Robert Milkins beat Joe Jogia 5–3 in the final. Ricky Walden made the highest break of 140. Results are given below.

Last 32; Best of 7 frames
Joe Perry (ENG)	3
Jamie Cope (ENG)	4
Jimmy Robertson (ENG)	0
Ricky Walden (ENG)	4
Tom Ford (ENG)	2
Craig Steadman (ENG)	4
Liu Song (CHN)	4
Gerard Greene (NIR)	1
Michael White (WAL)	2
Joe Jogia (ENG)	4
Rod Lawler (ENG)	4
Nigel Bond (ENG)	2
Tony Drago (MLT)	2
Peter Lines (ENG)	4
Adrian Gunnell (ENG)	w/d
Barry Pinches (ENG)	w/o
Marcus Campbell (SCO)	3
Fergal O'Brien (IRL)	4
Ben Woollaston (ENG)	0
Mark Davis (ENG)	4
Sam Baird (ENG)	4
Mark Joyce (ENG)	3
Judd Trump (ENG)	4
Mark King (ENG)	1
Matthew Selt (ENG)	4
Andy Hicks (ENG)	2
Stuart Bingham (ENG)	4
Ken Doherty (IRL)	0
Daniel Wells (WAL)	1
Robert Milkins (ENG)	4
Martin Gould (ENG)	1
Dave Harold (ENG)	4

Last 16; Best of 7 frames
(England) Jamie Cope	1
(England) Ricky Walden	4
(England) Craig Steadman	3
(China) Liu Song	4
(England) Joe Jogia	4
(England) Rod Lawler	3
(England) Peter Lines	4
(England) Barry Pinches	3
(Republic of Ireland) Fergal O'Brien	1
(England) Mark Davis	4
(England) Sam Baird	3
(England) Judd Trump	4
(England) Matthew Selt	4
(England) Stuart Bingham	3
(England) Robert Milkins	4
(England) Dave Harold	3

Quarter-finals; Best of 7 frames
(England) Ricky Walden	4
(China) Liu Song	2
(England) Joe Jogia	4
(England) Peter Lines	2
(England) Mark Davis	0
(England) Judd Trump	4
(England) Matthew Selt	3
(England) Robert Milkins	4

Semi-finals; Best of 9 frames
(England) Ricky Walden	0
(England) Joe Jogia	5
(England) Judd Trump	4
(England) Robert Milkins	5

Final; Best of 9 frames
(England) Joe Jogia	3
(England) Robert Milkins	5

=== Preliminary round ===
- Michael Holt (ENG) 3–4 Joe Perry (ENG)
- Mark Williams (WAL) 1–4 Jamie Cope (ENG)
- Ricky Walden (ENG) 4–0 Mike Dunn (ENG)
- James Wattana (THA) 3–4 Craig Steadman (ENG)
- Chris Norbury (ENG) w/d–w/o Gerard Greene (NIR)
- Joe Jogia (ENG) 4–2 Stephen Lee (ENG)
- Nigel Bond (ENG) 4–2 Atthasit Mahitthi (THA)
- Peter Lines (ENG) 4–0 Andrew Higginson (ENG)
- Graeme Dott (SCO) w/d–w/o Barry Pinches (ENG)
- Anthony Hamilton (ENG) 1–4 Fergal O'Brien (IRL)
- Ben Woollaston (ENG) 4–3 Andrew Norman (ENG)
- Mark Davis (ENG) 4–1 Paul Davies (WAL)
- Noppadol Sangnil (THA) 1–4 Mark Joyce (ENG)
- Simon Bedford (ENG) 2–4 Judd Trump (ENG)
- Joe Swail (NIR) 3–4 Mark King (ENG)
- Matthew Couch (ENG) 2–4 Andy Hicks (ENG)
- Stuart Bingham (ENG) 4–2 Ryan Day (WAL)
- Lee Spick (ENG) 2–4 Ken Doherty (IRL)
- Robert Milkins (ENG) 4–2 Zhang Anda (CHN)
- Dave Harold (ENG) 4–3 Barry Hawkins (ENG)

=== Century breaks ===
- 140, 105, 103, 102, 102, 100 – Ricky Walden
- 137, 118 – Robert Milkins
- 137 – Simon Bedford
- 137 – Craig Steadman
- 129 – Jamie Cope
- 125, 104 – Stuart Bingham
- 123, 116, 102 – Judd Trump
- 121 – Rod Lawler
- 120 – Ken Doherty
- 113, 103 – Sam Baird
- 113 – Liu Song
- 110 – Mark King
- 107 – Matthew Couch
- 102 – Joe Jogia

== Event 5 ==
=== Prize fund ===
- Winner: £5,000
- Runner-up: £2,500
- Semi-final: £1,500
- Quarter-final: £500
- Last 16: £250
- High break: £500

Event 5 took place at the George Scott Snooker Club in Liverpool, from 16 to 18 February 2010. Barry Hawkins beat Michael Holt 5–1 in the final. Judd Trump made the highest break of 138. Results are given below.

Last 32; Best of 7 frames
Peter Lines (ENG)	4
Gerard Greene (NIR)	0
Jimmy Robertson (ENG)	3
Liang Wenbo (CHN)	4
Rod Lawler (ENG)	2
Michael Holt (ENG)	4
Robert Milkins (ENG)	1
Dave Harold (ENG)	4
Mark King (ENG)	w/d
Ben Woollaston (ENG)	w/o
Ricky Walden (ENG)	1
Daniel Wells (WAL)	4
Craig Steadman (ENG)	4
Judd Trump (ENG)	3
Simon Bedford (ENG)	4
Andrew Norman (ENG)	3
Tom Ford (ENG)	4
Mark Davis (ENG)	0
Martin Gould (ENG)	w/d
Tony Drago (MLT)	w/o
Nigel Bond (ENG)	3
Andy Hicks (ENG)	4
Joe Swail (NIR)	2
Adrian Gunnell (ENG)	4
Andrew Higginson (ENG)	4
Graeme Dott (SCO)	3
Stuart Bingham (ENG)	4
Mark Joyce (ENG)	1
Barry Hawkins (ENG)	4
Chris Norbury (ENG)	1
Fergal O'Brien (IRL)	w/o
Anthony Hamilton (ENG)	w/d

Last 16; Best of 7 frames
(England) Peter Lines	4
(China) Liang Wenbo	3
(England) Michael Holt	4
(England) Dave Harold	0
(England) Ben Woollaston	3
(Wales) Daniel Wells	4
(England) Craig Steadman	4
(England) Simon Bedford	3
(England) Tom Ford	1
(Malta) Tony Drago	4
(England) Andy Hicks	0
(England) Adrian Gunnell	4
(England) Andrew Higginson	0
(England) Stuart Bingham	4
(England) Barry Hawkins	4
(Republic of Ireland) Fergal O'Brien	0

Quarter-finals; Best of 7 frames
(England) Peter Lines	1
(England) Michael Holt	4
(Wales) Daniel Wells	4
(England) Craig Steadman	0
(Malta) Tony Drago	2
(England) Adrian Gunnell	4
(England) Stuart Bingham	1
(England) Barry Hawkins	4

Semi-finals; Best of 9 frames
(England) Michael Holt	5
(Wales) Daniel Wells	4
(England) Adrian Gunnell	4
(England) Barry Hawkins	5

Final; Best of 9 frames
(England) Michael Holt	1
(England) Barry Hawkins	5

=== Preliminary round ===
- Liang Wenbo (CHN) 4–2 Jamie Cope (ENG)
- Matthew Selt (ENG) 2–4 Michael Holt (ENG)
- Matthew Couch (ENG) 1–4 Ben Woollaston (ENG)
- Sam Baird (ENG) 1–4 Judd Trump (ENG)
- Stephen Lee (ENG) w/d–w/o Adrian Gunnell (ENG)
- Barry Pinches (ENG) 0–4 Graeme Dott (SCO)
- Ken Doherty (IRL) 2–4 Chris Norbury (ENG)

=== Century breaks ===
- 138 – Judd Trump
- 137 – Ken Doherty
- 135, 129, 121 – Liang Wenbo
- 134 – Rod Lawler
- 132, 128, 104 – Stuart Bingham
- 131 – Graeme Dott
- 130 – Craig Steadman
- 128, 105 – Tom Ford
- 125 – Nigel Bond
- 124 – Mark Joyce
- 123, 106 – Barry Hawkins
- 122 – Jamie Cope
- 122 – Adrian Gunnell
- 109, 102 – Michael Holt
- 106 – Simon Bedford
- 104, 100 – Daniel Wells
