= 2006–07 snooker world ranking points =

Preceded by 2005/2006	2006/2007	Succeeded by 2007/2008

Snooker world ranking points 2006/2007: The official world ranking points for the 96 professional snooker players in the 2006–07 season are listed below. The total points from the seasons 2005–06 and 2006–07 were used to determine the rankings for the season 2007/2008.

== Ranking points ==
No.	Player	Points 2005/06	NIT	GP	UK	WO	MC	CO	WSC	Points 2006/07	Total
1	(Scotland) John Higgins	19150	1900	2500	4800	700	700	2500	10000	23100	42250
2	(Scotland) Graeme Dott	19100	2500	575	4800	1900	2500	5000	1400	18675	37775
3	(England) Shaun Murphy	16350	2500	1400	1050	2500	5000	2500	6400	21350	37700
4	(Republic of Ireland) Ken Doherty	20250	2500	1900	2850	1900	2500	2500	1400	15550	35800
5	(England) Ronnie O'Sullivan	12850	4000	2500	2850	2500	700	3200	5000	20750	33600
6	(England) Peter Ebdon	15550	700	1400	7500	700	3200	700	3800	18000	33550
7	(Australia) Neil Robertson	12575	1900	5000	1050	5000	1900	1900	3800	20550	33125
8	(Scotland) Stephen Hendry	15100	1900	575	6000	1900	2500	700	3800	17375	32475
9	(China) Ding Junhui	14475	5000	1400	3750	575	1400	1400	2800	16325	30800
10	(Scotland) Stephen Maguire	11000	1900	1400	2850	3200	1900	1900	6400	19550	30550
11	(England) Mark Selby	9125	1900	1900	2100	1900	575	1900	8000	18275	27400
12	(Wales) Mark Williams	18300	1900	575	2850	700	700	700	1400	8825	27125
13	(England) Stephen Lee	13500	3200	1900	2850	700	1900	700	1400	12650	26150
14	(England) Ali Carter	9550	700	1400	1050	2500	3200	1900	5000	15750	25300
15	(England) Steve Davis	13100	700	1400	3750	3200	700	700	1400	11850	24950
16	(Wales) Ryan Day	10050	2500	1900	2100	575	4000	575	2800	14450	24500
17	(Northern Ireland) Joe Swail	12600	575	1400	2100	1400	575	1900	3800	11750	24350
18	(England) Joe Perry	11750	575	2500	3750	1400	575	575	2800	12175	23925
19	(England) Barry Hawkins	14600	700	1400	1050	700	700	3200	1400	9150	23750
20	(Wales) Matthew Stevens	8600	1900	1900	2850	700	700	1900	5000	14950	23550
21	(England) Mark King	10100	1400	3200	2100	575	2500	1400	1150	12325	22425
22	(England) Jamie Cope	10375	450	4000	675	1400	450	4000	900	11875	22250
23	(England) Stuart Bingham	12300	575	575	2850	1400	1400	1900	1150	9850	22150
24	(England) Michael Holt	11275	575	1400	863	1400	1900	1400	2800	10338	21613
25	(England) Nigel Bond	10350	1400	1400	863	1900	1400	575	2800	10338	20688
26	(England) Anthony Hamilton	9413	700	575	863	2500	700	700	5000	11038	20451
27	(Hong Kong) Marco Fu	11500	575	575	0	575	1900	2500	2800	8925	20425
28	(England) Ian McCulloch	7188	1400	2500	863	1400	575	1400	3800	11938	19126
29	(Northern Ireland) Mark Allen	8250	1150	1150	1350	1150	900	1150	3800	10650	18900
30	(England) Dave Harold	9625	450	900	2100	1900	1150	450	2300	9250	18875
31	(Wales) Dominic Dale	8700	3200	1150	675	450	1150	450	2300	9375	18075
32	(Northern Ireland) Gerard Greene	8600	1900	1400	2100	1400	450	1150	900	9300	17900
33	(Thailand) James Wattana	11150	1400	575	863	575	575	1400	1150	6538	17688
34	(Republic of Ireland) Michael Judge	7475	1150	1150	1725	1900	1400	450	2300	10075	17550
35	(England) David Gray	9713	575	1900	2100	575	575	575	1150	7450	17163
36	(England) Ricky Walden	8225	450	900	2100	1150	1400	450	2300	8750	16975
37	(Republic of Ireland) Fergal O'Brien	7125	450	1400	675	450	1900	1150	3800	9825	16950
38	(Scotland) Alan McManus	6200	575	3200	2850	1400	575	575	1150	10325	16525
39	(England) John Parrott	6663	450	900	1725	1150	1150	450	3800	9625	16288
40	(England) Adrian Gunnell	6675	450	900	1725	1150	1150	1150	2300	8825	15500
41	(England) Andy Hicks	7613	575	575	863	575	575	1400	2800	7363	14976
42	(England) Andrew Norman	6600	1400	1900	488	900	900	900	1800	8288	14888
43	(England) Mark Davis	8400	450	900	675	450	450	1150	2300	6375	14775
44	(England) Andrew Higginson	4100 (Note: Starter points given to new players on the tour.)	650	650	975	4000	1900	650	1800	10625	14725
45	(England) David Gilbert	5975	900	650	1350	1400	1150	325	2800	8575	14550
46	(Scotland) Jamie Burnett	5125	1400	200	2100	1900	325	1150	2300	9375	14500
47	(England) Robert Milkins	6338	1400	1900	863	575	1400	575	1150	7863	14201
48	(England) Rory McLeod	5825	1150	900	1725	900	900	325	2300	8200	14025
49	(England) Rod Lawler	5850	1150	650	2100	1150	1400	450	900	7800	13650
50	(England) Tom Ford	6300	450	1400	675	450	1900	1400	900	7175	13475
51	(England) Judd Trump	4800	900	1150	1350	650	650	1150	2800	8650	13450
52	(Scotland) Marcus Campbell	5200	450	650	1725	450	1400	1150	2300	8125	13325
53	(England) Stuart Pettman	7975	1400	650	488	900	325	900	650	5313	13288
54	(Finland) Robin Hull	6338	325	1400	2850	325	325	900	650	6775	13113
55	(England) David Roe	7375	1400	1150	488	325	1400	325	650	5738	13113
56	(England) Barry Pinches	7563	450	650	1725	450	450	450	900	5075	12638
57	(Scotland) Drew Henry	6825	450	200	675	450	450	1150	2300	5675	12500
58	(Republic of Ireland) Joe Delaney	4975	900	200	1725	1150	325	325	2800	7425	12400
59	(England) Mike Dunn	5238	1400	200	2100	900	325	325	1800	7050	12288
60	(England) Jimmy White	6450	450	900	675	450	450	1900	900	5725	12175
61	(England) Jimmy Michie	4413	1150	900	1350	900	1150	325	1800	7575	11988
62	(Wales) Paul Davies	5500	1150	650	488	325	900	900	1800	6213	11713
63	(Scotland) Scott MacKenzie	6050	325	650	2100	325	325	900	650	5275	11325
64	(Wales) Ian Preece	4100	200	900	1350	1150	650	1400	1300	6950	11050
65	(England) Lee Spick	5450	650	900	300	650	650	1150	1300	5600	11050
66	(China) Liang Wenbo	4125	650	1400	975	1150	650	650	1300	6775	10900
67	(England) Joe Jogia	5050	325	200	488	325	1150	1400	1800	5688	10738
68	(Malta) Tony Drago	4525	1150	650	1350	900	900	325	650	5925	10450
69	(China) Tian Pengfei	4100	1400	200	975	200	1150	900	1300	6125	10225
70	(England) Matthew Couch	5525	1150	650	300	200	200	650	1300	4450	9975
71	(Republic of Ireland) David Morris	4100	200	900	1350	900	650	200	1300	5500	9600
72	(China) Liu Song	4100	650	200	1725	650	200	200	1800	5425	9525
73	(England) Mark Joyce	4100	650	200	300	650	900	900	1800	5400	9500
74	(England) Alfie Burden	4100	650	650	300	200	900	1400	1300	5400	9500
75	(England) Ben Woollaston	4100	650	1150	975	1400	200	200	400	4975	9075
76	(England) James Leadbetter	4100	200	650	975	650	200	200	1800	4675	8775
77	(England) Peter Lines	4100	200	900	1350	200	650	900	400	4600	8700
78	(England) Chris Norbury	4663	650	900	300	200	900	650	400	4000	8663
79	(Thailand) Issara Kachaiwong	4100	200	1400	975	650	200	650	400	4475	8575
80	(England) Sean Storey	3700	650	900	1350	650	650	200	400	4800	8500
81	(Thailand) Passakorn Suwannawat	4100	200	200	975	200	200	650	1800	4225	8325
82	(Wales) Jamie Jones	4100	650	1150	975	650	200	200	400	4225	8325
83	(England) Paul Davison	4100	200	1150	300	200	650	200	1300	4000	8100
84	(Malta) Alex Borg	4000	200	200	300	900	200	650	1300	3750	7750
85	(England) Chris Melling	4100	650	900	300	200	900	200	400	3550	7650
86	(Pakistan) Shokat Ali	4088	325	900	488	325	325	325	650	3338	7426
87	(Northern Ireland) Dermot McGlinchey	4100	900	650	300	650	200	200	400	3300	7400
88	(England) Lee Page	4100	650	200	300	200	200	200	1300	3050	7150
89	(New Zealand) Dene O'Kane	4100	0	0	975	200	200	900	400	2675	6775
90	(United Arab Emirates) Mohammed Shehab	4100	200	650	300	200	650	200	400	2600	6700
91	(Scotland) Robert Stephen	4100	200	650	300	650	200	200	400	2600	6700
92	(England) Jeff Cundy	4100	200	200	975	200	200	200	400	2375	6475
93	(Scotland) Mark Boyle	4100	200	200	300	200	200	650	400	2150	6250
94	(Germany) Patrick Einsle	4100	200	650	300	200	200	200	400	2150	6250
95	(England) Paul Wykes	4250	0	200	300	200	900	0	400	2000	6250
96	(Netherlands) Roy Stolk	4100	200	200	300	200	200	200	400	1700	5800
