= 2009–10 snooker world rankings =

No. 1: Ronnie O'Sullivan
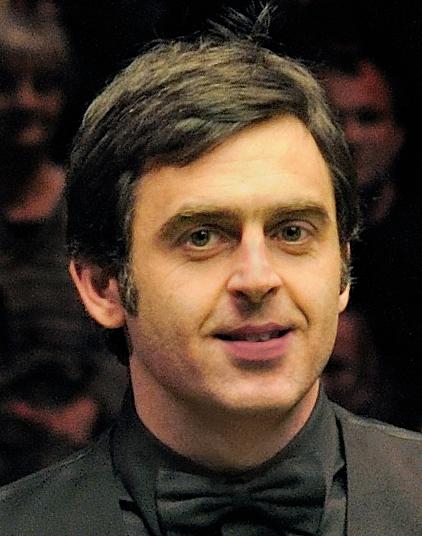

Personal information
- Born: December 5, 1975 (age 50)

Sport
- Country: England
- Sport: Snooker
- Professional: 1992–present
- Highest ranking: 1

Preceded by 2008–09	2009–10	Succeeded by 2010–11

2009–10 snooker world rankings: The professional world rankings for all the professional snooker players in the 2008‍–‍09 season who qualified for the 2009‍–‍10 season are listed below. The points listed here take into account the 2007‍–‍08 world ranking points and the 2008‍–‍09 world ranking points.

No. 2: Stephen Maguire
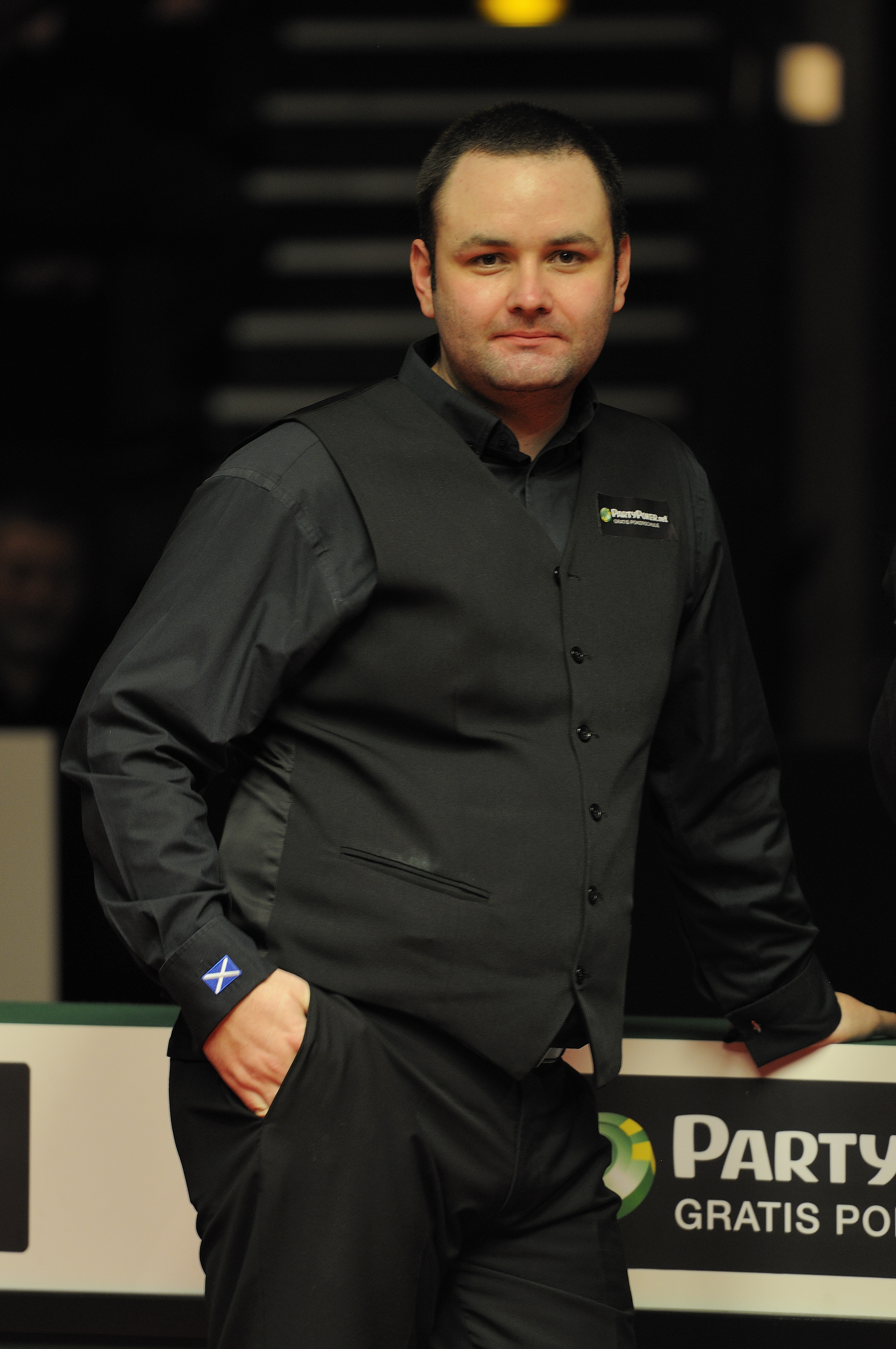

Personal information
- Born: March 13, 1981 (age 45)

Sport
- Country: Scotland
- Sport: Snooker
- Professional: 1998–present
- Highest ranking: 2

No. 3: Shaun Murphy
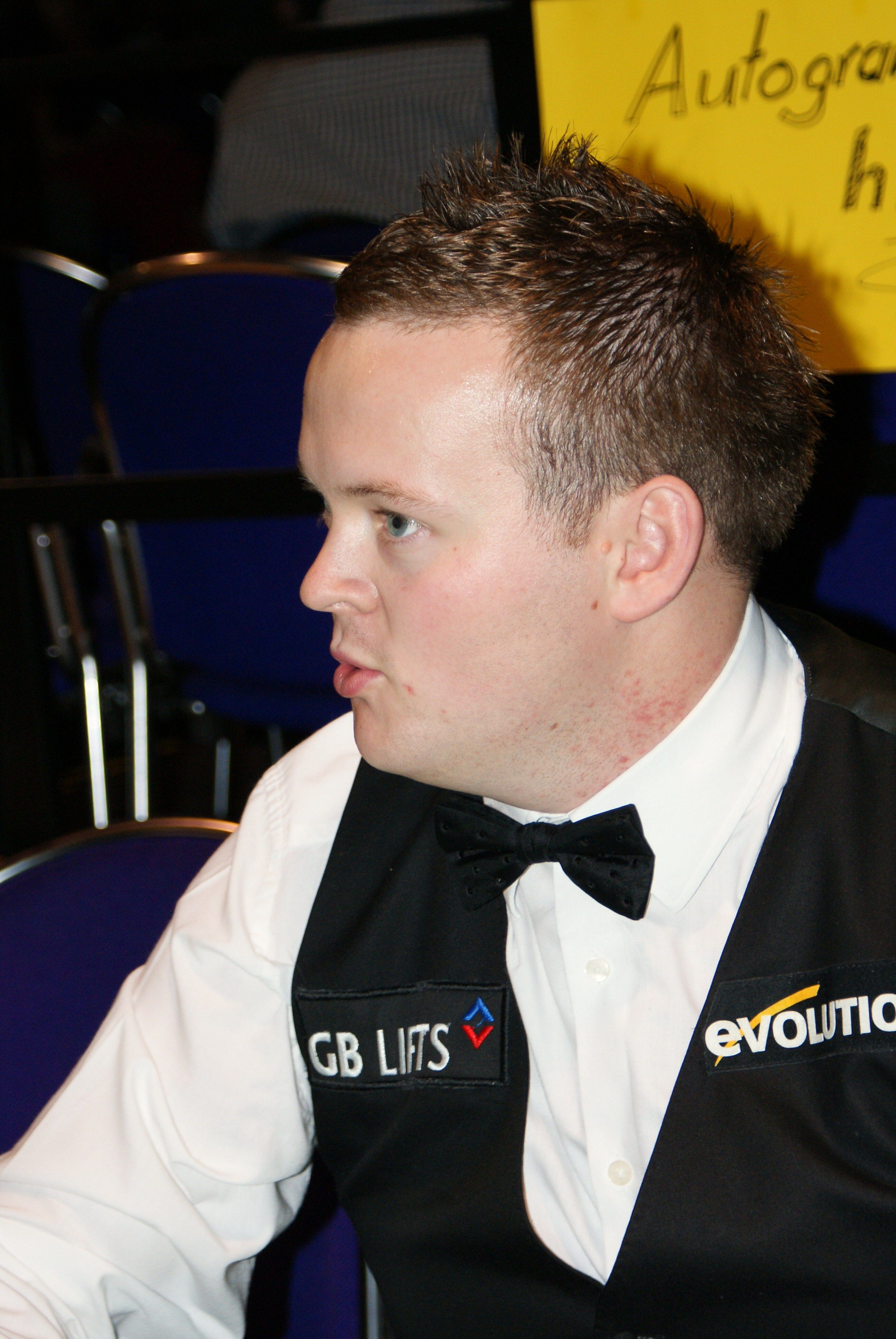

Personal information
- Born: August 10, 1982 (age 44)

Sport
- Country: England
- Sport: Snooker
- Professional: 1997–present
- Highest ranking: 3

No.	Name	Country	Points
1	Ronnie O'Sullivan	England	53575
2	Stephen Maguire	Scotland	48050
3	Shaun Murphy	England	47175
4	John Higgins	Scotland	45825
5	Ali Carter	England	42525
6	Ryan Day	Wales	40675
7	Mark Selby	England	37975
8	Marco Fu	Hong Kong	37350
9	Neil Robertson	Australia	35225
10	Stephen Hendry	Scotland	33125
11	Mark Allen	Northern Ireland	32875
12	Joe Perry	England	32875
13	Ding Junhui	China	29644
14	Peter Ebdon	England	29400
15	Mark Williams	Wales	29319
16	Mark King	England	28300
17	Barry Hawkins	England	27175
18	Jamie Cope	England	26632
19	Dave Harold	England	26607
20	Ricky Walden	England	26050
21	Stuart Bingham	England	25419
22	Joe Swail	Northern Ireland	24894
23	Steve Davis	England	24544
24	Michael Holt	England	23225
25	Stephen Lee	England	23188
26	Matthew Stevens	Wales	23132
27	Liang Wenbo	China	22825
28	Graeme Dott	Scotland	22494
29	Nigel Bond	England	22357
30	Judd Trump	England	21901
31	Fergal O'Brien	Ireland	20795
32	Gerard Greene	Northern Ireland	20751
33	Anthony Hamilton	England	20688
34	Dominic Dale	Wales	20620
35	Ian McCulloch	England	19263
36	Michael Judge	Ireland	19007
37	Stuart Pettman	England	18770
38	Mike Dunn	England	18739
39	Rory McLeod	England	18163
40	Jamie Burnett	Scotland	17888
41	Alan McManus	Scotland	17801
42	Adrian Gunnell	England	17500
43	Andrew Higginson	England	17438
44	Ken Doherty	Ireland	17363
45	Marcus Campbell	Scotland	16863
46	Martin Gould	England	16645
47	Mark Davis	England	16588
48	Jimmy Michie	England	16000
49	Tom Ford	England	15963
50	Andy Hicks	England	15832
51	David Gilbert	England	15625
52	Barry Pinches	England	15570
53	John Parrott	England	15225
54	Paul Davies	Wales	14326
55	Robert Milkins	England	14107
56	Jimmy White	England	14038
57	Mark Joyce	England	14001
58	David Morris	Ireland	13445
59	Liu Song	China	13370
60	Jin Long	China	12976
61	Rod Lawler	England	12783
62	David Roe	England	12620
63	Joe Delaney	Ireland	12558
64	Peter Lines	England	12238
65	David Gray	England	12208
66	Ian Preece	Wales	12170
67	Matthew Selt	England	12113
68	Lee Spick	England	11975
69	Matthew Couch	England	11838
70	Daniel Wells	Wales	11688
71	Li Hang	China	11338
72	Simon Bedford	England	11288
73	Patrick Wallace	Northern Ireland	11150
74	Andrew Norman	England	11126
75	Atthasit Mahitthi	Thailand	10938

== Notes ==
- Former world number 1 Mark Williams returns to the top 16, but no new players attain this ranking.
- The player to drop out of the top 16 is Graeme Dott (after being in the top 16 for seven consecutive seasons).
- Players to reach career high rankings within the top 16 are: Ali Carter No.5, Ryan Day No.6, Marco Fu No.8 and Mark Allen No.11.
- Three new players reach the top 32: Ricky Walden, Liang Wenbo and Judd Trump. Two players return to the top 32: Michael Holt at No.24 and Gerard Greene at No.32. Five players drop out: Anthony Hamilton, Dominic Dale, Ian McCulloch, Michael Judge and Ken Doherty to 33rd, 34th, 35th, 36th and 44th place respectively.
