= 2008–09 snooker world rankings =

No. 1: Ronnie O'Sullivan
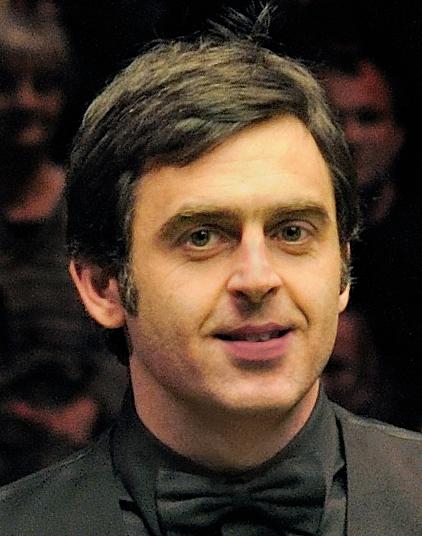

Personal information
- Born: December 5, 1975 (age 50)

Sport
- Country: England
- Sport: Snooker
- Professional: 1992–present
- Highest ranking: 1

Preceded by 2007–08	2008–09	Succeeded by 2009–10

2008–09 snooker world rankings: The professional world rankings for all the professional snooker players in the 2007‍–‍08 season who qualified for the 2008‍–‍09 season are listed below. The points listed here take into account the 2006‍–‍07 world ranking points and the 2007‍–‍08 world ranking points.

No. 2: Stephen Maguire
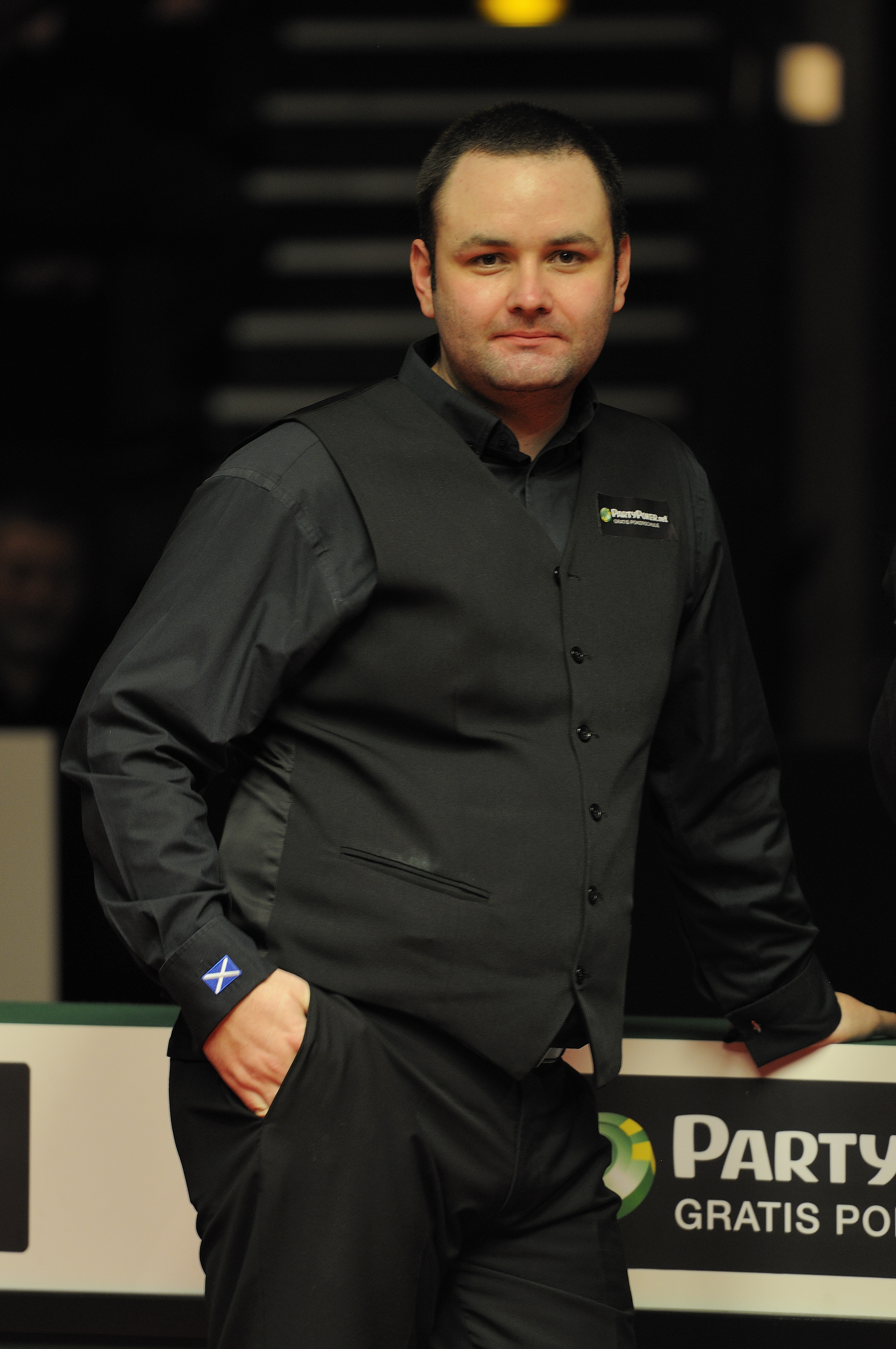

Personal information
- Born: March 13, 1981 (age 45)

Sport
- Country: Scotland
- Sport: Snooker
- Professional: 1998–present
- Highest ranking: 2

No. 3: Shaun Murphy
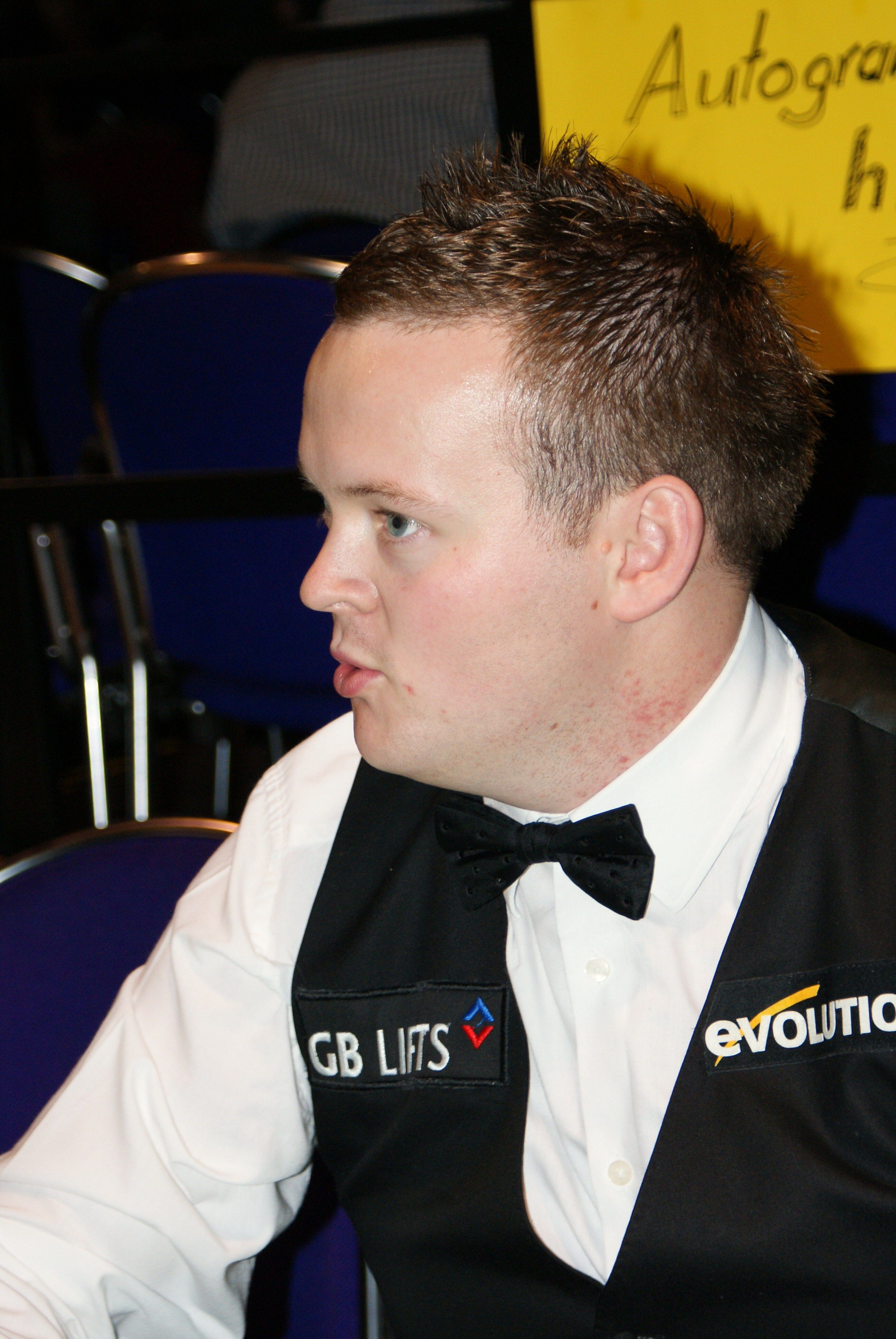

Personal information
- Born: August 10, 1982 (age 44)

Sport
- Country: England
- Sport: Snooker
- Professional: 1997–present
- Highest ranking: 3

No.	Name	Country	Points
1	Ronnie O'Sullivan	England	50450
2	Stephen Maguire	Scotland	45525
3	Shaun Murphy	England	45050
4	Mark Selby	England	38325
5	John Higgins	Scotland	37925
6	Stephen Hendry	Scotland	34275
7	Ali Carter	England	34175
8	Ryan Day	Wales	33875
9	Peter Ebdon	England	32975
10	Neil Robertson	Australia	32950
11	Ding Junhui	China	32194
12	Joe Perry	England	30425
13	Graeme Dott	Scotland	27144
14	Marco Fu	Hong Kong	27000
15	Mark King	England	26000
16	Mark Allen	Northern Ireland	25725
17	Matthew Stevens	Wales	25413
18	Ken Doherty	Ireland	25119
19	Jamie Cope	England	24744
20	Joe Swail	Northern Ireland	24725
21	Stuart Bingham	England	24625
22	Mark Williams	Wales	23925
23	Nigel Bond	England	23613
24	Fergal O'Brien	Ireland	22538
25	Ian McCulloch	England	22432
26	Stephen Lee	England	22219
27	Barry Hawkins	England	22125
28	Dave Harold	England	21494
29	Steve Davis	England	21419
30	Michael Judge	Ireland	20825
31	Anthony Hamilton	England	20813
32	Dominic Dale	Wales	20688
33	Gerard Greene	Northern Ireland	19538
34	Michael Holt	England	19288
35	Ricky Walden	England	18975
36	Adrian Gunnell	England	18375
37	Alan McManus	Scotland	18263
38	Andrew Higginson	England	17513
39	John Parrott	England	17450
40	Liang Wenbo	China	17275
41	Judd Trump	England	16351
42	Marcus Campbell	Scotland	16325
43	David Gilbert	England	16225
44	Rory McLeod	England	16125
45	Jamie Burnett	Scotland	16013
46	Jimmy Michie	England	15550
47	Mike Dunn	England	15501
48	Tom Ford	England	14825
49	David Gray	England	14338
50	Barry Pinches	England	14250
51	Robert Milkins	England	14113
52	David Roe	England	14038
53	Liu Song	China	13900
54	Andrew Norman	England	13801
55	Ian Preece	Wales	13475
56	Andy Hicks	England	13263
57	Paul Davies	Wales	13101
58	Mark Davis	England	13088
59	Mark Joyce	England	12963
60	Rod Lawler	England	12713
61	Joe Delaney	Ireland	12701
62	Stuart Pettman	England	12476
63	Martin Gould	England	11813
64	David Morris	Ireland	11538
65	Jimmy White	England	11513
66	Scott MacKenzie	Scotland	10688
67	Lee Spick	England	10950
68	Matthew Selt	England	10688
69	Patrick Wallace	Northern Ireland	10675
70	Rodney Goggins	Ireland	10563
71	James McBain	Scotland	10550
72	Supoj Saenla	Thailand	10488
73	Liu Chuang	China	10050

== Notes ==
- Three former top 16 players re-enter that group. They are Joe Perry, Marco Fu and Mark King.
- Mark Allen is the only new member of the top 16.
- The players to drop out the top 16 are long standing top 16 players: Stephen Lee (in the top 16 for 11 consecutive seasons), Mark Williams (for 12), Ken Doherty (for 15) and Steve Davis.
- Players to reach career high rankings within the top 16 are: Stephen Maguire No.2, Mark Selby No.4, Ali Carter No.7, Ryan Day No.8, Joe Perry No.12, Marco Fu No.14 and Mark Allen No.16.
- No new players reach the top 32, however two players return: former world No.9 Fergal O'Brien at No.24 and Michael Judge at No.30. Two players drop out: Gerard Greene and Michael Holt to 33rd and 34th place respectively.
- Other players to reach career high rankings within the top 64 are: Jamie Cope up to No.19, Stuart Bingham No.21, Ricky Walden No.35, Andrew Higginson No.38, Liang Wenbo No.40, Judd Trump No.41, David Gilbert No.43, Rory McLeod No.44, Jimmy Michie No.46, Mike Dunn No.47, Tom Ford No.48, Liu Song No.53 and Ian Preece No.55. New players to enter the top 64 are Mark Joyce at No.59, Martin Gould No.63 and David Morris No.64.
- Former top player Jimmy White falls out the top 64 to 65th place, but remains on the tour via the one year list.
- Former top 32 player Robin Hull retires from the main tour due to illness.
