= 2006–07 snooker world rankings =

Preceded by 2005–06	2006–07	Succeeded by 2007–08

The professional world rankings for all snooker players on the main tour in the 2006‍–‍07 season are listed below. The total points from the 2004‍–‍05 and 2005‍–‍06 seasons were used to determine the rankings.

== Rankings ==
Ranking	Player	2004–05	2005–06 season							Total
Ranking	Player	Points	GP	UK	WO	MC	CO	WSC	Points	Total
1	(Scotland) Stephen Hendry	21337	3200	4800	700	2500	2500	1400	15100	36437
2	(Republic of Ireland) Ken Doherty	15887	1400	3750	1900	5000	3200	5000	20250	36137
3	(England) Ronnie O'Sullivan	23162	4000	1050	700	0	700	6400	12850	36012
4	(Scotland) John Higgins	15812	5000	2850	1900	4000	4000	1400	19150	34962
5	(England) Shaun Murphy	16375	1900	2850	4000	1900	700	5000	16350	32725
6	(Scotland) Graeme Dott	13500	450	1050	2500	3200	1900	10000	19100	32600
7	(England) Peter Ebdon	15650	1400	2850	700	700	1900	8000	15550	31200
8	(Wales) Mark Williams	12837	450	2850	2500	2500	5000	5000	18300	31137
9	(Scotland) Stephen Maguire	19725	450	2850	700	2500	700	3800	11000	30725
10	(England) Stephen Lee	15625	450	1050	5000	700	2500	3800	13500	29125
11	(England) Steve Davis	15775	1900	6000	700	700	0	3800	13100	28875
12	(England) Barry Hawkins	13225	3200	2100	3200	1900	1400	2800	14600	27825
13	(Australia) Neil Robertson	14425	450	3750	575	1400	1400	5000	12575	27000
14	(Wales) Matthew Stevens	15262	450	1050	1900	700	700	3800	8600	23862
15	(England) Ali Carter	14175	450	3750	575	1400	575	2800	9550	23725
16	(England) Anthony Hamilton	14312	1400	863	3200	575	575	2800	9413	23725
17	(Wales) Ryan Day	13025	900	1725	1900	575	1150	3800	10050	23075
18	(England) Joe Perry	11250	450	4800	700	1900	2500	1400	11750	23000
19	(Scotland) Alan McManus	15975	450	1050	700	1900	700	1400	6200	22175
20	(England) Nigel Bond	11725	1400	2100	575	1900	575	3800	10350	22075
21	(England) Michael Holt	10662	2500	2100	1400	575	1900	2800	11275	21937
22	(Hong Kong) Marco Fu	10412	450	2100	575	1400	575	6400	11500	21912
23	(England) David Gray	12100	2500	863	575	575	1400	3800	9713	21813
24	(England) Stuart Bingham	9475	2500	3750	450	1900	1400	2300	12300	21775
25	(Thailand) James Wattana	10575	450	2100	2500	1400	1900	2800	11150	21725
26	(England) Ian McCulloch	14537	1400	863	2500	700	575	1150	7188	21725
27	(China) Ding Junhui	7225	250	7500	900	325	3200	2300	14475	21700
28	(England) Mark Selby	12325	900	675	1900	450	1400	3800	9125	21450
29	(England) Mark King	11075	1400	2850	575	1900	575	2800	10100	21175
30	(Northern Ireland) Joe Swail	8137	1900	2100	1900	1400	2500	2800	12600	20737
31	(England) Andy Hicks	12925	1400	863	1400	575	575	2800	7613	20538
32	(England) Robert Milkins	14000	450	863	1900	1400	575	1150	6338	20338
33	(England) Barry Pinches	12700	2500	863	575	1900	575	1150	7563	20263
(Note: Paul Hunter did not play during the 2006‍–‍07 season and died on 9 October 2006.)	(England) Paul Hunter	13200	450	2850	700	700	700	1400	6800	20000
34	(England) Jimmy White	12787	1900	1050	700	700	700	1400	6450	19237
35	(England) Dave Harold	9075	1400	1725	1150	1150	1400	2800	9625	18700
36	(England) Ricky Walden	10175	1400	1725	1150	1150	1900	900	8225	18400
37	(England) Mark Davis	9975	250	2850	1400	1150	450	2300	8400	18375
38	(Northern Ireland) Gerard Greene	9487	1900	2100	450	1400	450	2300	8600	18087
39	(Wales) Dominic Dale	8575	900	2100	1150	3200	450	900	8700	17275
40	(England) Adrian Gunnell	10225	1400	675	450	450	1400	2300	6675	16900
41	(Scotland) Drew Henry	10062	250	1725	1400	1150	1400	900	6825	16887
42	(England) John Parrott	9650	450	863	575	1400	575	2800	6663	16313
43	(Republic of Ireland) Michael Judge	8275	1400	1725	450	1150	450	2300	7475	15750
44	(England) Tom Ford	9025	900	1350	900	450	900	1800	6300	15325
45	(Republic of Ireland) Fergal O'Brien	7525	1400	675	1150	1150	450	2300	7125	14650
46	(England) Rod Lawler	8625	900	1350	200	900	200	2300	5850	14475
47	(England) Jamie Cope	3837 (Note: Starter points given to new players on the tour.)	1900	1725	1900	1150	1900	1800	10375	14212
48	(Scotland) Marcus Campbell	8950	250	1350	325	1150	325	1800	5200	14150
49	(England) Rory McLeod	8275	1400	1725	450	450	900	900	5825	14100
50	(Finland) Robin Hull	7525	900	488	325	2500	325	1800	6338	13863
51	(Malta) Tony Drago	9012	900	675	450	1150	450	900	4525	13537
52	(England) Stuart Pettman	5375	1900	1725	450	450	1150	2300	7975	13350
53	(England) Mike Dunn	8025	900	488	325	900	325	2300	5238	13263
54	(Scotland) Jamie Burnett	7975	250	2100	325	900	900	650	5125	13100
55	(Pakistan) Shokat Ali	8875	250	488	325	900	325	1800	4088	12963
56	(England) David Roe	5412	900	975	1150	1150	1900	1300	7375	12787
57	(Wales) Paul Davies	6750	900	1350	650	650	650	1300	5500	12250
58	(England) Andrew Norman	5625	1900	1350	900	650	1400	400	6600	12225
59	(Scotland) Scott MacKenzie	6125	250	300	1400	900	1900	1300	6050	12175
60	(England) Jimmy Michie	7725	900	488	325	900	1150	650	4413	12138
61	(Northern Ireland) Mark Allen	3837	900	2100	900	1400	650	2300	8250	12087
62	(England) Joe Jogia	6275	900	1350	650	650	200	1300	5050	11325
63	(Republic of Ireland) Joe Delaney	5650	250	975	650	650	650	1800	4975	10625
64	(England) Sean Storey	6725	900	1350	200	650	200	400	3700	10425
65	(Wales) Darren Morgan	6700	1400	300	650	650	200	400	3600	10300
66	(England) Alfie Burden	6075	250	300	1400	200	650	1300	4100	10175
67	(England) David Gilbert	3837	250	975	650	900	900	2300	5975	9812
68	(England) Simon Bedford	6950	250	300	200	650	900	400	2700	9650
69	(England) Paul Wykes	5250	250	1350	200	0	650	1800	4250	9500
70	(England) Matthew Couch	3837	250	1350	900	900	325	1800	5525	9362
71	(Republic of Ireland) Leo Fernandez	5675	250	975	200	900	900	400	3625	9300
72	(England) Lee Spick	3837	250	1350	325	325	900	2300	5450	9287
73	(Northern Ireland) Patrick Wallace	5525	250	488	1150	450	325	900	3563	9088
74	(England) Judd Trump	3837	250	300	1150	650	1150	1300	4800	8637
75	(England) Chris Norbury	3837	1400	488	900	900	325	650	4663	8500
76	(England) Gary Wilson	4275	900	300	900	200	200	1300	3800	8075
77	(China) Liang Wenbo	3837	250	975	1400	200	900	400	4125	7962
78	(Wales) Lee Walker	4337	1400	488	325	325	325	650	3513	7850
79	(Malta) Alex Borg	3837	250	1350	200	200	200	1800	4000	7837
80	(Belgium) Bjorn Haneveer	3837	900	1350	900	200	200	400	3950	7787
81	(England) Brian Morgan	5475	250	488	325	0	200	650	1913	7388
82	(England) James Tatton	3837	250	488	325	325	325	1800	3513	7350
83	(England) Justin Astley	3837	250	488	900	325	900	650	3513	7350
84	(England) Gary Wilkinson	3587	250	975	650	1150	200	400	3625	7212
85	(Republic of Ireland) David McDonnell	4600	250	300	200	200	200	1300	2450	7050
86	(England) Nick Dyson	4075	250	300	200	650	200	1300	2900	6975
87	(Scotland) Hugh Abernethy	4050	250	300	200	650	900	400	2700	6750
88	(England) Adam Davies	4200	250	300	200	650	650	400	2450	6650
89	(England) Stuart Mann	3837	900	300	200	200	650	400	2650	6487
90	(Bahrain) Habib Subah	3837	250	300	200	200	200	400	1550	5387
91	(Malaysia) Moh Keen Ho	3837	250	300	0	200	200	0	950	4787
92	(England) Steve James	3600	250	300	0	0	0	0	550	4150
93	(China) Jin Long	2500	250	300	0	200	0	400	1150	3650

== Notes ==
For this season,

- Stephen Hendry, despite having not had the best of seasons, regains the number one spot after nine years from second place.
- Paul Hunter drops out of the top 32, down from number five to number 34 in the points list at the end of the 2005‍–‍06 season, shortly before his death.
- Jimmy White drops out of the top 32 after his worst season to date, down from 8 to 34.
- Alan McManus drops out of the top 16 after ten seasons, down from 12 to 19.
- Ian McCulloch drops out of the top 16 after one season, down from 16 to 25.
- Anthony Hamilton re-enters the top 16 after gaining one place, from 17 to 16.
- Barry Pinches drops out of the top 32, down from 18 to 33.
- Ali Carter reaches the top 16 for the first time in his career, rising from 19th to 15th.
- Neil Robertson enters the top 16, from number 27 to number 13.
- John Parrott drops out of the top 32, down from 28 to 42.
- Ryan Day officially enters the top 32, from 33 (just outside the top 32, although he replaced the suspended Quinten Hann, officially in 22nd place at the time, during most of the season) to 17.
- Stuart Bingham and Ding Junhui enter the top 32, from 37th to 24th and 62nd to 27th respectively.
- Mark Selby and Joe Swail re-enter the top 32, from 38th to 28th and 40th to 30th respectively.
