= 1993 Asian Open =

Asian Open
Tournament information
- Dates: 13–20 March 1993
- Venue: Imperial Queens Park Hotel
- City: Bangkok
- Country: Thailand
- Organisation: WPBSA
- Format: Ranking event

Final
- Champion: Dave Harold (ENG)
- Runner-up: Darren Morgan (WAL)
- Score: 9–3

The 1993 Nescafe Asian Open was a professional ranking snooker tournament that took place between 13 and 20 March 1993 at the Imperial Queens Park Hotel in Bangkok, Thailand.

Dave Harold won the tournament by defeating Darren Morgan 9–3 in the final. The defending champion Steve Davis was eliminated in the last 32 by Fergal O'Brien.

== Main draw ==
Last 64; Best of 9 frames
(England) Steve Davis | 5
(England) Mark Rowing | 0
(Republic of Ireland) Fergal O'Brien | 5
(Wales) Doug Mountjoy | 2
(England) Willie Thorne | 5
(Wales) Anthony Davies | 2
(Republic of Ireland) Ken Doherty | 5
(England) Roger Garrett | 0
(Wales) Darren Morgan | 5
(Northern Ireland) Jack McLaughlin | 4
(England) Nick Dyson | 5
(England) Tony Jones | 2
(England) John Read | 5
(Wales) Terry Griffiths | 2
(England) Nick Fruin | 5
(Wales) Mark Bennett | 2
(Thailand) James Wattana | 5
(England) Tony Meo | 1
(Republic of Ireland) Stephen Murphy | 5
(Malta) Tony Drago | 1
(England) Ronnie O'Sullivan | 5
(England) Steve James | 2
(Northern Ireland) Joe Swail | 5
(England) Dean Reynolds | 3
(Scotland) Alan McManus | 5
(England) Ian Graham | 3
(England) Tony Knowles | 5
(England) Peter Ebdon | 0
(England) Jimmy White | 5
(England) Sean Lanigan | 0
(England) Mike Hallett | 5
(England) Karl Broughton | 3
(England) John Parrott | 5
(England) Sean Storey | 4
(England) David Roe | 5
(Scotland) Craig MacGillivray | 1
(England) Martin Clark | 5
(England) Guy Dennis | 1
(England) Joe Johnson | 5
(England) Troy Shaw | 4
(England) Stephen Lee | 5
(England) Nigel Bond | 4
(Australia) John Campbell | 5
(Australia) Eddie Charlton | 0
(Wales) Paul Davies | 5
(England) Gary Wilkinson | 2
(Pakistan) Shokat Ali | 5
(South Africa) Peter Francisco | 3
(England) Paul Tanner | 5
(England) Neal Foulds | 3
(England) Mark Johnston-Allen | 5
(Canada) Brady Gollan | 4
(Northern Ireland) Dennis Taylor | 5
(England) Simon Morris | 2
(England) Jason Ferguson | 5
(South Africa) Silvino Francisco | 3
(England) Dave Harold | 5
(Canada) Alain Robidoux | 3
(New Zealand) Dene O'Kane | 5
(England) Anthony Hamilton | 4
(Scotland) Stephen Hendry | 5
(England) Dave Finbow | 0
(England) Jamie Woodman | 5
(England) Danny Fowler | 4

Last 32; Best of 9 frames
(England) Steve Davis | 4
(Republic of Ireland) Fergal O'Brien | 5
(England) Willie Thorne | 5
(Republic of Ireland) Ken Doherty | 4
(Wales) Darren Morgan | 5
(England) Nick Dyson | 4
(England) John Read | 3
(England) Nick Fruin | 5
(Thailand) James Wattana | 5
(Republic of Ireland) Stephen Murphy | 2
(England) Ronnie O'Sullivan | 2
(Northern Ireland) Joe Swail | 5
(Scotland) Alan McManus | 5
(England) Tony Knowles | 4
(England) Jimmy White | 5
(England) Mike Hallett | 3
(England) John Parrott | 5
(England) David Roe | 3
(England) Martin Clark | 4
(England) Joe Johnson | 5
(England) Stephen Lee | 5
(Australia) John Campbell | 1
(Wales) Paul Davies | 5
(Pakistan) Shokat Ali | 0
(England) Paul Tanner | 5
(England) Mark Johnston-Allen | 4
(Northern Ireland) Dennis Taylor | 4
(England) Jason Ferguson | 5
(England) Dave Harold | 5
(New Zealand) Dene O'Kane | 2
(Scotland) Stephen Hendry | 5
(England) Jamie Woodman | 1

Last 16; Best of 9 frames
(Republic of Ireland) Fergal O'Brien | 3
(England) Willie Thorne | 5
(Wales) Darren Morgan | 5
(England) Nick Fruin | 3
(Thailand) James Wattana | 5
(Northern Ireland) Joe Swail | 2
(Scotland) Alan McManus | 4
(England) Jimmy White | 5
(England) John Parrott | 5
(England) Joe Johnson | 1
(England) Stephen Lee | 2
(Wales) Paul Davies | 5
(England) Paul Tanner | 5
(England) Jason Ferguson | 3
(England) Dave Harold | 5
(Scotland) Stephen Hendry | 2

Quarter-finals; Best of 9 frames
(England) Willie Thorne | 2
(Wales) Darren Morgan | 5
(Thailand) James Wattana | 1
(England) Jimmy White | 5
(England) John Parrott | 2
(Wales) Paul Davies | 5
(England) Paul Tanner | 2
(England) Dave Harold | 5

Semi-finals; Best of 9 frames
(Wales) Darren Morgan | 5
(England) Jimmy White | 4
(Wales) Paul Davies | 2
(England) Dave Harold | 5

Final; Best of 17 frames
(Wales) Darren Morgan | 3
(England) Dave Harold | 9
