= 2007–08 snooker world rankings =

No. 1: John Higgins
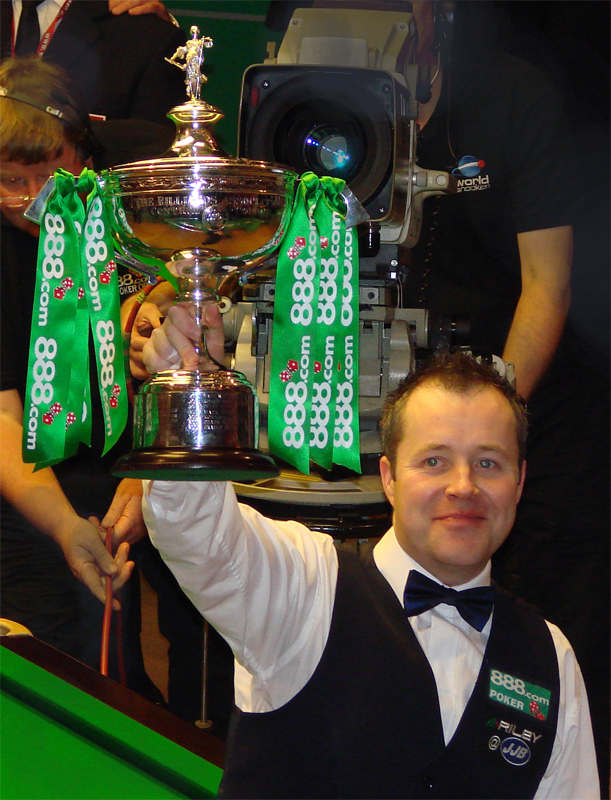

Personal information
- Born: May 18, 1975 (age 51)

Sport
- Country: Scotland
- Sport: Snooker
- Professional: 1992–present
- Highest ranking: 1

| Preceded by 2006–07 | 2007–08 | Succeeded by 2008–09 |

2007–08 snooker world rankings: The professional world rankings for the top 75 snooker players (plus seven others who are officially ranked 76–82; if all players on the pro tour were ranked, they would be lower) in the 2007‍–‍08 season are listed below. The points listed here take into account ranking tournament performances from the previous two seasons (2005‍–‍06 and 2006‍–‍07).

No. 2: Graeme Dott
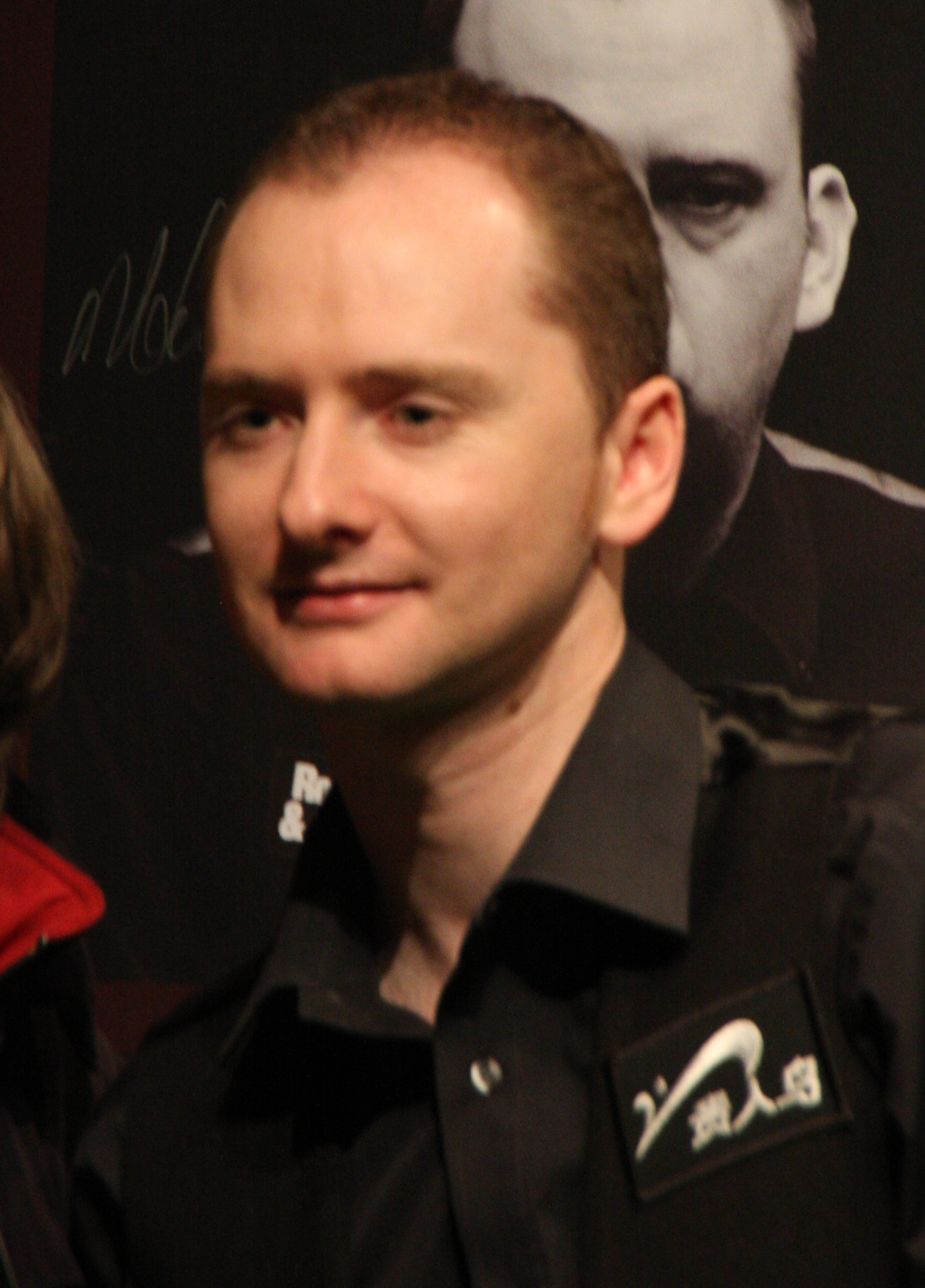

Personal information
- Born: May 12, 1977 (age 49)

Sport
- Country: Scotland
- Sport: Snooker
- Professional: 1994–present
- Highest ranking: 2

No. 3: Shaun Murphy
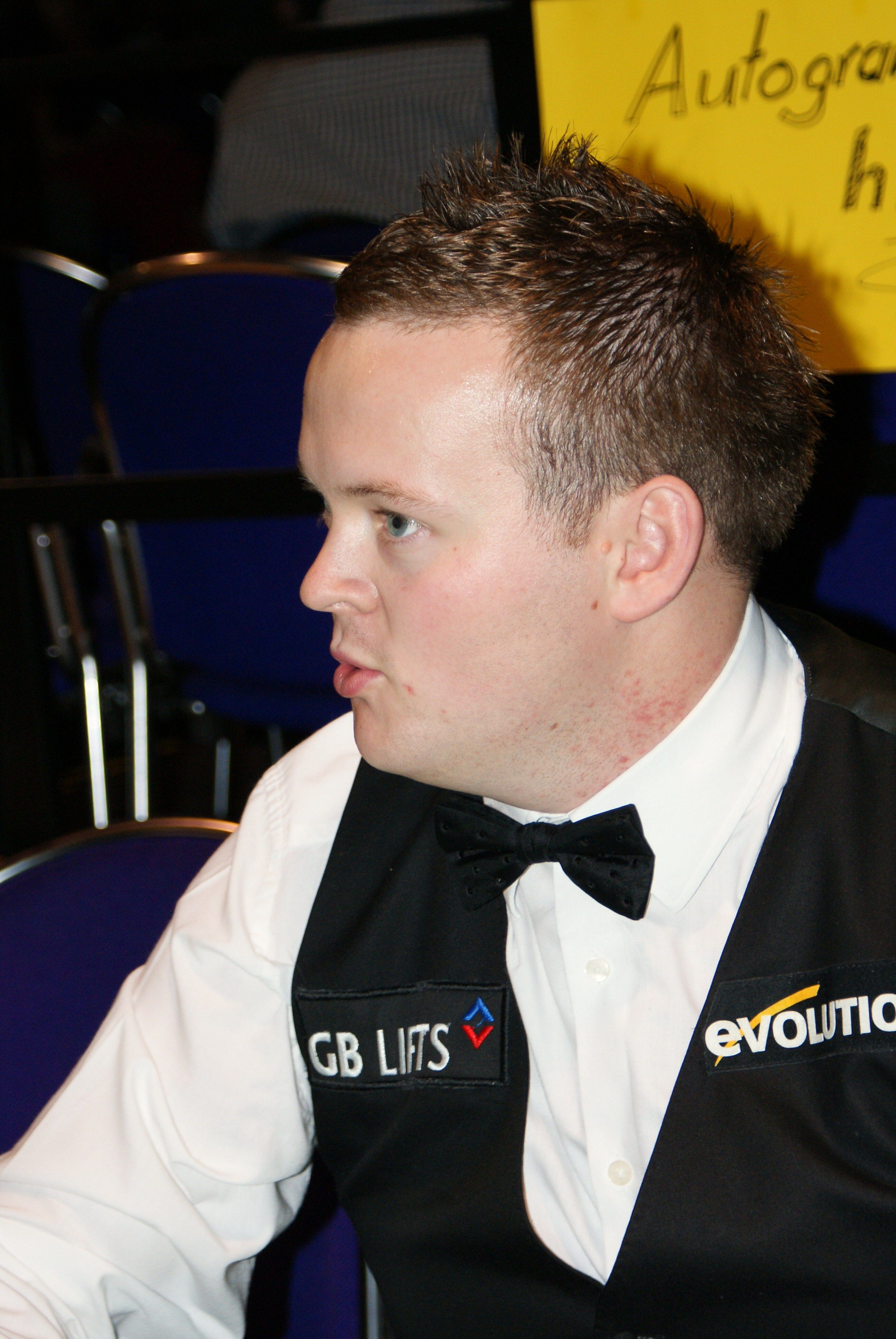

Personal information
- Born: August 10, 1982 (age 44)

Sport
- Country: England
- Sport: Snooker
- Professional: 1997–present
- Highest ranking: 3

| No. | Name | Country | Points |
|---|---|---|---|
| 1 | John Higgins | Scotland | 42250 |
| 2 | Graeme Dott | Scotland | 37775 |
| 3 | Shaun Murphy | England | 37700 |
| 4 | Ken Doherty | Ireland | 35800 |
| 5 | Ronnie O'Sullivan | England | 33600 |
| 6 | Peter Ebdon | England | 33550 |
| 7 | Neil Robertson | Australia | 33125 |
| 8 | Stephen Hendry | Scotland | 32475 |
| 9 | Ding Junhui | China | 30800 |
| 10 | Stephen Maguire | Scotland | 30550 |
| 11 | Mark Selby | England | 27400 |
| 12 | Mark Williams | Wales | 27125 |
| 13 | Stephen Lee | England | 26150 |
| 14 | Ali Carter | England | 25300 |
| 15 | Steve Davis | England | 24950 |
| 16 | Ryan Day | Wales | 24500 |
| 17 | Joe Swail | Northern Ireland | 24350 |
| 18 | Joe Perry | England | 23925 |
| 19 | Barry Hawkins | England | 23750 |
| 20 | Matthew Stevens | Wales | 23550 |
| 21 | Mark King | England | 22425 |
| 22 | Jamie Cope | England | 22250 |
| 23 | Stuart Bingham | England | 22150 |
| 24 | Michael Holt | England | 21613 |
| 25 | Nigel Bond | England | 20688 |
| 26 | Anthony Hamilton | England | 20451 |
| 27 | Marco Fu | Hong Kong | 20425 |
| 28 | Ian McCulloch | England | 19126 |
| 29 | Mark Allen | Northern Ireland | 18900 |
| 30 | Dave Harold | England | 18875 |
| 31 | Dominic Dale | Wales | 18075 |
| 32 | Gerard Greene | Northern Ireland | 17900 |
| 33 | James Wattana | Thailand | 17688 |
| 34 | Michael Judge | Ireland | 17550 |
| 35 | David Gray | England | 17163 |
| 36 | Ricky Walden | England | 16965 |
| 37 | Fergal O'Brien | Ireland | 16950 |
| 38 | Alan McManus | Scotland | 16525 |
| 39 | John Parrott | England | 16288 |
| 40 | Adrian Gunnell | England | 15500 |
| 41 | Andy Hicks | England | 14976 |
| 42 | Andrew Norman | England | 14888 |
| 43 | Mark Davis | England | 14775 |
| 44 | Andrew Higginson | England | 14725 |
| 45 | David Gilbert | England | 14550 |
| 46 | Jamie Burnett | Scotland | 14500 |
| 47 | Robert Milkins | England | 14201 |
| 48 | Rory McLeod | England | 14025 |
| 49 | Rod Lawler | England | 13650 |
| 50 | Tom Ford | England | 13475 |
| 51 | Judd Trump | England | 13450 |
| 52 | Marcus Campbell | Scotland | 13325 |
| 53 | Stuart Pettman | England | 13288 |
| 54 | Robin Hull | Finland | 13113 |
| 55 | David Roe | England | 13113 |
| 56 | Barry Pinches | England | 12638 |
| 57 | Drew Henry | Scotland | 12500 |
| 58 | Joe Delaney | Ireland | 12400 |
| 59 | Mike Dunn | England | 12288 |
| 60 | Jimmy White | England | 12175 |
| 61 | Jimmy Michie | England | 11988 |
| 62 | Paul Davies | Wales | 11713 |
| 63 | Scott MacKenzie | Scotland | 11325 |
| 64 | Ian Preece | Wales | 11050 |
| 65 | Lee Spick | England | 11050 |
| 66 | Liang Wenbo | China | 10900 |
| 67 | Joe Jogia | England | 10738 |
| 68 | Tony Drago | Malta | 10450 |
| 69 | Tian Pengfei | China | 10225 |
| 70 | Matthew Couch | England | 9975 |
| 71 | David Morris | Ireland | 9600 |
| 72 | Liu Song | China | 9525 |
| 73 | Mark Joyce | England | 9500 |
| 74 | Alfie Burden | England | 9500 |
| 75 | Ben Woollaston | England | 9075 |
| 76 | Chris Norbury | England | 8663 |
| 77 | Sean Storey | England | 8500 |
| 78 | Shokat Ali | Pakistan | 7426 |
| 79 | Jeff Cundy | England | 6475 |
| 80 | Paul Wykes | England | 6250 |
| 81 | James Tatton | England | 3513 |
| 82 | Hugh Abernethy | Scotland | 1800 |

== Notes ==
- Entering the top 16 for the first time: Ding Junhui (27 to 9), Mark Selby (28 to 11) and Ryan Day (17 to 16). Additionally, Graeme Dott, Shaun Murphy, Neil Robertson and Ali Carter reach career-high rankings.
- Stephen Hendry, who was still the world number 1 the previous season, drops down to number 8, marking his worst ranking since the 1987‍–‍88 season.
- Jimmy White drops down from number 35 to number 60, after his least successful season ever, earning only 5725 points in the 2006‍–‍07 season alone, down from 6450 in the 2005‍–‍06 season.
- Former world number 4 Matthew Stevens drops down from number 14 to number 20.
- Barry Hawkins and Anthony Hamilton both drop out of the top 16 after a single season – Hawkins is down from number 12 to number 19, and Hamilton from number 16 to number 26.
- Mark Allen moves up the rankings, from number 62 to number 29. Jamie Cope also reaches the top 32 for the first time (48 to 22),
- Three players re-enter the top 32: Dave Harold (36 to 30), Dominic Dale (40 to 31) and Gerard Greene (39 to 32)
- Five players necessarily drop out of the top 32: James Wattana (25 to 33), David Gray (23 to 35), Alan McManus (19 to 38), Andy Hicks (31 to 41) and Robert Milkins (32 to 47).
- Andrew Higginson rises 66 places from number 110 to number 44.
- Judd Trump is up 21 spots from number 72 to number 51.
- Tony Drago drops out of the top 64, from 52 to 68.
