= 2008 China Open (snooker) =

Honghe Industrial China Open
Tournament information
- Dates: 24–30 March 2008
- Venue: Beijing University Students' Gymnasium
- City: Beijing
- Country: China
- Organisation: WPBSA
- Format: Ranking event
- Total prize fund: £250,000
- Winner's share: £48,000
- Highest break: Stephen Maguire (SCO) (147)

Final
- Champion: Stephen Maguire (SCO)
- Runner-up: Shaun Murphy (ENG)
- Score: 10–9

The 2008 Honghe Industrial China Open was a professional ranking snooker tournament that took place between 24 and 30 March 2008 at the Beijing University Students' Gymnasium in Beijing, China. This was the penultimate ranking event of the 2007–08 season, preceding the 2008 World Snooker Championship.

The defending champion was Graeme Dott, but he lost in the first round against Barry Pinches.

Shaun Murphy and Dave Harold set two new records in the eighth frame of their first round match. Murphy eventually won it after 93 minutes and 12 seconds, beating the record of the longest televised frame between Mark Selby and Marco Fu at the 2007 UK Championship and the longest frame in professional competition between Cliff Thorburn and Stephen O'Connor at the 1994 Welsh Open qualifiers, which took 77 minutes 31 seconds and 92 minutes 52 seconds respectively.

Stephen Maguire made the first maximum break in an Asian ranking tournament in the second frame of his semi-final encounter against Ryan Day.

Maguire won his fourth ranking title by defeating Murphy 10–9 in a high-quality final.

== Prize fund ==
The breakdown of prize money for this year is shown below:

- Winner: £48,000
- Runner-up: £22,500
- Semi-final: £12,000
- Quarter-final: £6,500
- Last 16: £4,275
- Last 32: £2,750
- Last 48: £1,725
- Last 64: £1,325
- Stage one highest break: £500
- Stage two highest break: £2,000
- Stage one maximum break: £1,000
- Stage two maximum break: £20,000
- Total: £250,000

== Wildcard round ==
Match		Score	
WC1	Barry Pinches (ENG)	5–1	Zhang Anda (CHN)
WC2	Fergal O'Brien (IRL)	5–2	Cao Xinlong (CHN)
WC3	Marcus Campbell (SCO)	5–4	Ah Bulajiang (CHN)
WC4	Mike Dunn (ENG)	5–1	Yang Qingtian (CHN)
WC5	Dave Harold (ENG)	5–4	Jin Long (CHN)
WC6	Mark Allen (NIR)	5–2	Li Hang (CHN)
WC7	Marco Fu (HKG)	5–4	Li Yuan (CHN)
WC8	Ricky Walden (ENG)	5–3	Yu Delu (CHN)

== Main draw ==
Last 32; Best of 9 frames
1	(Scotland) Graeme Dott	1
(England) Barry Pinches	5
13	(England) Stephen Lee	3
(England) Nigel Bond	5
10	(Scotland) Stephen Maguire	5
(Republic of Ireland) Fergal O'Brien	3
8	(Scotland) Stephen Hendry	1
(England) Barry Hawkins	5
6	(England) Peter Ebdon	5
(England) Jamie Cope	1
12	(Wales) Mark Williams	5
(Scotland) Marcus Campbell	1
16	(Wales) Ryan Day	5
(Wales) Matthew Stevens	3
4	(Republic of Ireland) Ken Doherty	5
(England) Mike Dunn	2
3	(England) Shaun Murphy	5
(England) Dave Harold	3
9	(China) Ding Junhui	5
(England) Joe Perry	3
14	(England) Ali Carter	5
(England) Stuart Bingham	3
7	(Australia) Neil Robertson	2
(Northern Ireland) Mark Allen	5
5	(England) Ronnie O'Sullivan	4
(Hong Kong) Marco Fu	5
11	(England) Mark Selby	5
(England) Ricky Walden	2
15	(England) Steve Davis	2
(England) Mark King	5
2	(Scotland) John Higgins	5
(Northern Ireland) Joe Swail	4

Last 16; Best of 9 frames
(England) Barry Pinches	1
(England) Nigel Bond	5
10	(Scotland) Stephen Maguire	5
(England) Barry Hawkins	2
6	(England) Peter Ebdon	2
12	(Wales) Mark Williams	5
16	(Wales) Ryan Day	5
4	(Republic of Ireland) Ken Doherty	3
3	(England) Shaun Murphy	5
9	(China) Ding Junhui	4
14	(England) Ali Carter	3
(Northern Ireland) Mark Allen	5
(Hong Kong) Marco Fu	3
11	(England) Mark Selby	5
(England) Mark King	1
2	(Scotland) John Higgins	5

Quarter-finals; Best of 9 frames
(England) Nigel Bond	0
10	(Scotland) Stephen Maguire	5
12	(Wales) Mark Williams	3
16	(Wales) Ryan Day	5
3	(England) Shaun Murphy	5
(Northern Ireland) Mark Allen	3
11	(England) Mark Selby	5
2	(Scotland) John Higgins	2

Semi-finals; Best of 11 frames
10	(Scotland) Stephen Maguire	6
16	(Wales) Ryan Day	5
3	(England) Shaun Murphy	6
11	(England) Mark Selby	3

Final; Best of 19 frames
10	(Scotland) Stephen Maguire	10
3	(England) Shaun Murphy	9

== Final ==
Final: Best of 19 frames. Referee: Jan Verhaas. Beijing University Students' Gymnasium, Beijing, China, 30 March 2008.
Stephen Maguire (10); Scotland	10–9	Shaun Murphy (3); England
Afternoon: 60–41, 32–63 (54), 0–72 (72), 74–0 (74), 120–0 (106), 68–24, 114–0 (102), 0–136 (136); Evening: 24–75 (75), 36–61, 8–92 (81), 39–74, 137–0 (137), 80–15, 80–0 (80), 97–17 (89), 0–107 (86), 46–61, 64–40
137	Highest break	136
3	Century breaks	1
6	50+ breaks	6

== Qualifying ==
Qualifying for the tournament took place at Pontins in Prestatyn, Wales between 22 and 25 January 2008.

Round 1 Best of 9 frames

== Century breaks ==
=== Qualifying stage centuries ===
- 144 – Munraj Pal
- 138 – Andrew Higginson
- 134 – Jamie Cope
- 131 – James McBain
- 130, 104, 101 – Liu Chuang
- 128 – Mike Dunn
- 128 – Mark Allen
- 125 – Jimmy Michie
- 120 – Barry Pinches
- 119 – Jamie O'Neill
- 119 – Anthony Hamilton
- 114, 113 – Liu Song
- 113 – David Roe
- 112 – David Morris
- 110 – Michael Holt
- 104 – Leo Fernandez
- 104 – Stuart Pettman
- 104 – Dave Harold
- 103, 103, 102 – Matthew Selt
- 101, 101 – Marco Fu
- 100 – Michael Judge
- 100 –Lee Spick
- 100 – Fergal O'Brien
- 100 – Ian McCulloch

=== Televised stage centuries ===
- 147, 137, 126, 106, 105, 102 – Stephen Maguire
- 140, 136 – Ken Doherty
- 136, 112, 111 – Shaun Murphy
- 135, 118 – Mark Allen
- 132, 127, 117, 109, 106 – Mark Selby
- 128 – Fergal O'Brien
- 127, 116 – John Higgins
- 127, 116 – Barry Pinches
- 123, 104 – Ryan Day
- 121, 114, 105 – Marco Fu
- 115 – Jin Long
- 112 – Neil Robertson
- 110, 108, 101 – Mark Williams
- 110, 106 – Marcus Campbell
- 107, 104 – Ricky Walden
- 104, 101, 100 – Nigel Bond
- 102 – Barry Hawkins
