= Lee Spick =

English snooker player

Personal information
- Born: 25 April 1980 Mansfield, England
- Died: 26 January 2015 (aged 34)

Sport
- Country: England
- Sport: Snooker
- Professional: 2000/2001, 2002/2003, 2005–2010, 2013–2015
- Highest ranking: 65 (2007/2008)
- Best ranking finish: Last 48 (x5)

Lee Spick (25 April 1980 – 26 January 2015) was an English professional snooker player. A former English under-15 champion, he reached the last 48 of ranking events on five occasions, including twice in the World Championship.

== Career ==
He reached the Quarter-Final of the 2000 Benson and Hedges Championship, with wins against Darren Morgan and Dean Reynolds, as well as others, before losing to Mark Davis 4–5. He also reached the Quarter-Final of the 2001 event, beating the likes of World Championship runner-up Nigel Bond, before losing out to future World Champion Shaun Murphy 3–5

He reached the last 48 of the 2006 World Championship and the 2007 China Open. Previously in the 2005 World Championship he had victories over David Gilbert 10–5, before a remarkable 10–7 win over Ding Junhui, which put him only 2 matches away from a place at the Crucible, but Stuart Bingham denied him with a 10–2 victory. In the 2007 China Open he defeated Jeff Cundy, Tony Drago and Dominic Dale.

In the 2007 UK Championships qualifying, he defeated Jimmy White 9–7 in arguably one of the best results during his career, but he lost 8–9 to Andrew Higginson in the following round.

At the 2008 China Open, Spick defeated Ashley Wright, Rod Lawler and Mark Davis, before losing in the Last 48 to Dave Harold 0–5.

2008/09 season started relatively quiet for Spick. However, after recording impressive wins over Stephen Craigie (10–5), Barry Pinches (10–5) and Adrian Gunnell (10–2), he was within one match of reaching the Crucible for the first time in his career but lost narrowly 8–10 to Steve Davis. Spick seemed to carry that form into the next season, as he reached the last 48 stage of the Shanghai Masters, however he failed to win a further match during the season and as a result was relegated from the tour.

After having missed the opportunities to return to main tour via the 2011 and 2012 Q Schools, Spick announced his retirement from snooker. However he decided to come try again at the 2013 Q School, and at Event 3 he defeated Darrell Whitworth, Sanderson Lam, Darren Cook and Duane Jones to win a two-year card for the 2013–14 and 2014–15 seasons. Spick's return proved to be short-lived however, as he only played two matches, losing both, and had multiple withdrawals due to lack of sponsorship and a resulting depression. He never entered another professional tournament after the 2013 UK Championship.

=== Illness and death ===
World Snooker announced the death of Spick on 26 January 2015, after a liver-related illness.

== Performance and rankings timeline ==
| Tournament | 1997/ 98 | 1998/ 99 | 1999/ 00 | 2000/ 01 | 2001/ 02 | 2002/ 03 | 2003/ 04 | 2004/ 05 | 2005/ 06 | 2006/ 07 | 2007/ 08 | 2008/ 09 | 2009/ 10 | 2010/ 11 | 2012/ 13 | 2013/ 14 |
|---|---|---|---|---|---|---|---|---|---|---|---|---|---|---|---|---|
| Ranking (Note: From the 2010/2011 season it shows the ranking at the beginning of the season.) | (Note: He was not on the Main Tour.) | | | (Note: New players on the Main Tour do not have a ranking) | | | | | | 73 | 65 | 67 | 68 | | | |
Ranking tournaments
| Australian Goldfields Open | Tournament Not Held | | | | | | | | | | | | | | LQ | A |
| Shanghai Masters | Tournament Not Held | | | | | | | | | | LQ | LQ | LQ | A | A | A |
| International Championship | Tournament Not Held | | | | | | | | | | | | | | A | LQ |
| UK Championship | A | A | A | LQ | A | LQ | A | A | LQ | LQ | LQ | LQ | LQ | A | A | WD |
| Welsh Open | A | A | A | LQ | A | LQ | A | A | LQ | LQ | LQ | LQ | LQ | A | A | A |
| World Open (Note: The event ran under the names Grand Prix (1997/1998–2000/2001 and 2004/2005–2009/2010) and LG Cup (2001/2002–2003/2004)) | A | A | A | LQ | A | LQ | A | A | LQ | LQ | LQ | LQ | LQ | A | A | A |
| Players Tour Championship Finals (Note: The event ran under the name Players Tour Championship Grand Finals (2010/2011–2012/2013)) | Tournament Not Held | | | | | | | | | | | | | DNQ | A | DNQ |
| China Open (Note: The event ran under the name China International (1998/1999)) | NR | A | A | LQ | A | Not Held | | A | LQ | LQ | LQ | LQ | LQ | A | A | A |
| World Championship | A | LQ | LQ | LQ | LQ | LQ | LQ | LQ | LQ | LQ | LQ | LQ | LQ | A | A | A |
Non-ranking tournaments
| The Masters | LQ | A | A | LQ | LQ | LQ | A | A | LQ | LQ | LQ | A | A | A | A | A |
Former ranking tournaments
| Thailand Masters | A | A | A | LQ | NR | Not Held | | | NR | Tournament Not Held | | | | | | |
| Scottish Open (Note: The event ran under the name Players Championship (2003/2004)) | A | A | A | LQ | A | LQ | A | Tournament Not Held | | | | | | | MR | NH |
| British Open | A | A | A | LQ | A | LQ | A | Tournament Not Held | | | | | | | | |
| Irish Masters | Non-Ranking Event | | | | A | LQ | A | NH | NR | Tournament Not Held | | | | | | |
| Malta Cup (Note: The event ran under the names Irish Open (1998/1999) and European Open (2001/2002–2003/2004)) | Not Held | | | | | LQ | A | A | LQ | LQ | NR | Tournament Not Held | | | | |
| Northern Ireland Trophy | Tournament Not Held | | | | | | | NR | LQ | LQ | LQ | Tournament Not Held | | | | |
| Bahrain Championship | Tournament Not Held | | | | | | | | | | | LQ | Tournament Not Held | | | |
Former non-ranking tournaments
| Masters Qualifying Event (Note: The event ran under the name Benson & Hedges Championship (1997/1998–2002/2003)) | 2R | A | A | QF | QF | 2R | A | NH | 3R | 1R | 1R | A | A | Not Held | | |

Performance Table Legend
| LQ | lost in the qualifying draw | #R | lost in the early rounds of the tournament (WR = Wildcard round, RR = Round robin) | QF | lost in the quarter-finals |
| SF | lost in the semi-finals | F | lost in the final | W | won the tournament |
| DNQ | did not qualify for the tournament | A | did not participate in the tournament | WD | withdrew from the tournament |

| NH / Not Held | means an event was not held. |
| NR / Non-Ranking Event | means an event is/was no longer a ranking event. |
| R / Ranking Event | means an event is/was a ranking event. |
| MR / Minor-Ranking Event | means an event is/was a minor-ranking event. |

== Career finals ==
=== Non-ranking finals: 2 (2 titles) ===
| Outcome | No. | Year | Championship | Opponent in the final | Score |
|---|---|---|---|---|---|
| Winner | 1. | 2002 | Challenge Tour – Event 3 | (Republic of Ireland) Joe Delaney | 5–2 |
| Winner | 2. | 2002 | WPBSA Open Tour – Event 5 | (England) Mark Gray | 5–3 |

=== Amateur finals: 3 (2 titles) ===
| Outcome | No. | Year | Championship | Opponent in the final | Score |
|---|---|---|---|---|---|
| Winner | 1. | 1994 | English Under-15 Championship | (England) Michael Wild | 4–0 |
| Runner-up | 1. | 1995 | UK Under-15 Championship | (England) Shaun Murphy | 2–3 |
| Winner | 2. | 2001 | English Open | (Norway) Kurt Maflin | 8–0 |
