= Andrew Norman (snooker player) =

English snooker player (born 1980)

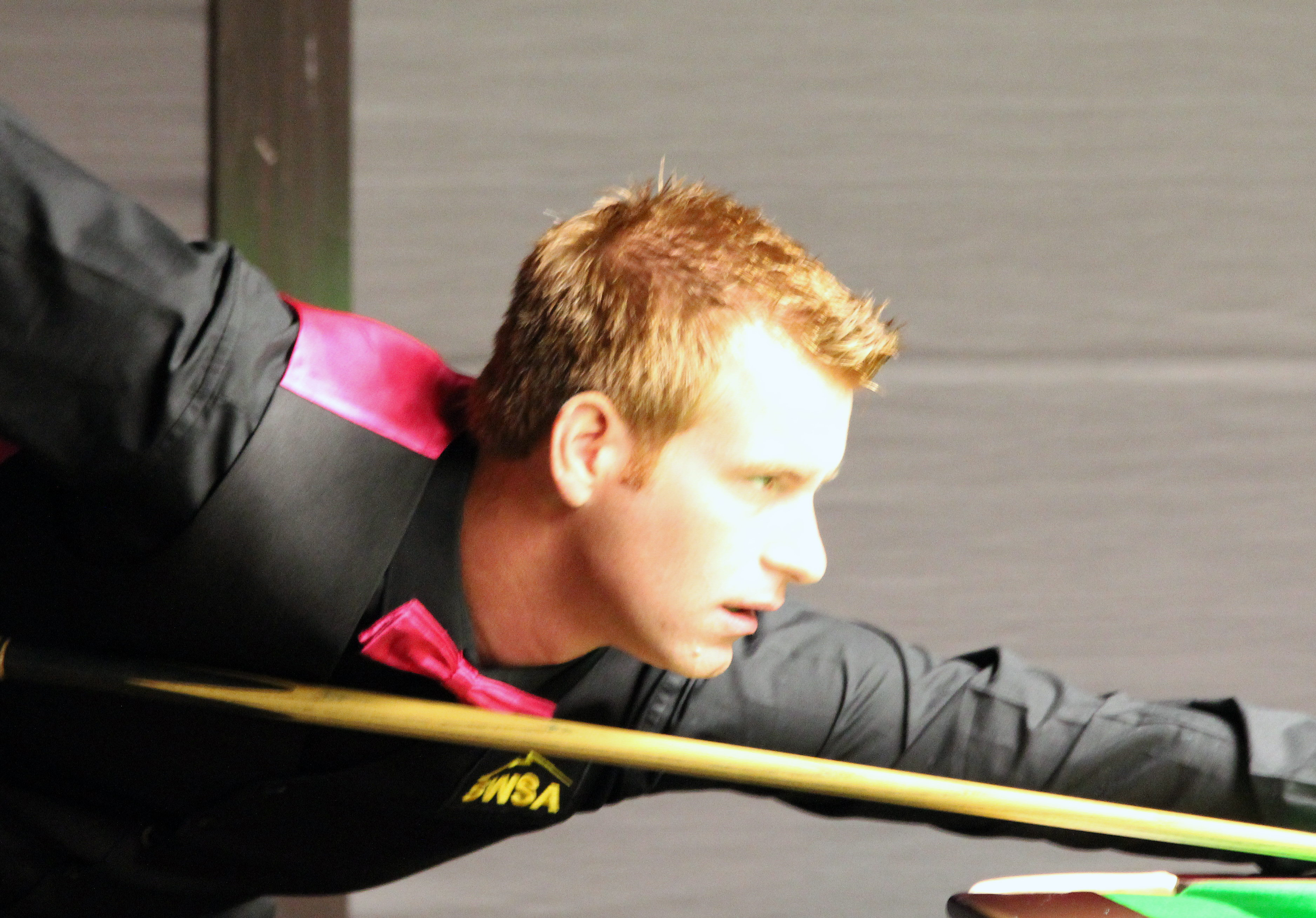
- Norman at the 2012 Paul Hunter Classic

Personal information
- Born: 27 June 1980 (age 46)

Sport
- Country: England
- Sport: Snooker
- Professional: 2001–2010, 2011/2012, 2013–2015
- Highest ranking: 42 (2007/08)
- Best ranking finish: Last 16 (x2)

Andrew Norman (born 27 June 1980) is an English former professional snooker player from Bristol.

== Career ==
Norman turned professional in 2001. He progressed up the ranking list between 2005 and 2007, jumping 30 places. His consistency was epitomised in 2006 as he lost his opening match in just one of the seven ranking events and had his best result in Aberdeen at the Royal London Watches Grand Prix when he reached the last 16 before losing to the eventual winner, Neil Robertson. In 2009, he was ranked 75 in the World Rankings, however, since then he fell out of the top 100. In May 2011, he won a qualifying game at the 2011 Q School to regain his tour card for the 2011–12 season.

Norman would need to win four qualifying matches to reach the main draws of the ranking events in the new season. He came closest to doing so in the first two events of the year, the Australian Goldfields Open and the Shanghai Masters, where on both occasions he won two matches before losing in the third qualifying round. His performances throughout the season were not enough to see him enter the top 64 in the world rankings who retain their places for the 2012–13 season and dropped off the main tour.

Norman could only enter Players Tour Championship events in the 2012/2013 season. He took part in 10 of them with his best finish coming in the European Tour Event 1 in Germany where he beat Ben Harrison, Nigel Bond, Phil Barnes and top 16 player Ricky Walden, before losing to Joe Swail 3–4 in the quarter-finals. It was this result which largely contributed to him finishing 57th on the Order of Merit to claim one of the eight spots on offer to players not on the main tour for the next season.

Norman did not win a match at the venue of a full ranking event during the 2013–14 season. He played in seven of the eight European Tour tournaments with his best results being three last 32 defeats to be placed 60th on the Order of Merit and 110th in the world rankings. Norman won only one match during the 2014–15 season, and following a 10–2 loss against Tom Ford at the 2015 World Championship qualifiers he decided to retire from professional snooker to concentrate on his coaching work at the South West Snooker Academy.

== Performance and rankings timeline ==
Tournament	1997/ 98	1998/ 99	1999/ 00	2000/ 01	2001/ 02	2002/ 03	2003/ 04	2004/ 05	2005/ 06	2006/ 07	2007/ 08	2008/ 09	2009/ 10	2010/ 11	2011/ 12	2012/ 13	2013/ 14	2014/ 15
Ranking (Note: It shows the ranking at the beginning of the season.)	(Note: He was an amateur.)				(Note: New players on the Main Tour don't have a ranking.)	99	92	77	72	58	42	54	74					83
Ranking tournaments
Wuxi Classic (Note: The event was called the Jiangsu Classic (2008/2009-2009/2010))	Tournament Not Held											Non-Ranking Event				A	LQ	WR
Australian Goldfields Open	Tournament Not Held														LQ	A	LQ	LQ
Shanghai Masters	Tournament Not Held										LQ	LQ	LQ	A	LQ	A	LQ	LQ
International Championship	Tournament Not Held															A	LQ	LQ
UK Championship	A	A	A	A	LQ	LQ	LQ	LQ	LQ	LQ	LQ	LQ	LQ	A	LQ	A	1R	1R
German Masters (Note: The event was called the German Open (1997/1998))	A	NR	Tournament Not Held											A	LQ	A	LQ	A
Welsh Open	A	A	A	A	LQ	LQ	LQ	1R	LQ	LQ	1R	LQ	LQ	A	LQ	A	1R	1R
Players Tour Championship Finals	Tournament Not Held													DNQ	DNQ	DNQ	DNQ	DNQ
China Open (Note: The event was called the China International (1997/1998-1998/1999))	NR	A	A	A	LQ	Not Held		LQ	WR	LQ	LQ	LQ	LQ	A	LQ	A	LQ	A
World Championship	LQ	LQ	LQ	LQ	LQ	LQ	LQ	LQ	LQ	LQ	LQ	LQ	LQ	A	LQ	LQ	LQ	LQ
Non-ranking tournaments
Masters	LQ	A	A	A	LQ	LQ	LQ	A	LQ	LQ	LQ	LQ	LQ	A	A	A	A	A
Former ranking tournaments
Thailand Masters	A	A	A	A	LQ	NR	Tournament Not Held			NR	Tournament Not Held							
Players Championship (Note: The event was called the Scottish Open (1997/1998-2002/2003, 2012/2013))	A	A	A	A	LQ	LQ	LQ	Tournament Not Held								MR	Not Held	
British Open	A	A	A	A	LQ	LQ	LQ	LQ	Tournament Not Held									
Irish Masters	Non-Ranking Event					LQ	LQ	LQ	NH	NR	Tournament Not Held							
Malta Cup (Note: The event was called the Irish Open (1998/1999) and the European Open (2001/2002-2003/2004))	NH	A	Not Held		LQ	LQ	LQ	LQ	LQ	LQ	NR	Tournament Not Held						
Northern Ireland Trophy	Tournament Not Held								NR	2R	LQ	LQ	Tournament Not Held					
Bahrain Championship	Tournament Not Held											LQ	Tournament Not Held					
World Open (Note: The event was called the Grand Prix (1997/1998-2000/2001, 2004/2005-2009/2010) and the LG Cup (2001/2002-2003/2004))	A	A	A	A	LQ	LQ	LQ	LQ	3R	2R	RR	LQ	LQ	A	LQ	A	LQ	NH
Former non-ranking tournaments
Merseyside Professional Championship	A	A	A	1R	3R	1R	A	2R	Tournament Not Held									

Performance Table Legend
LQ	lost in the qualifying draw	#R	lost in the early rounds of the tournament (WR = Wildcard round, RR = Round robin)	QF	lost in the quarter-finals
SF	lost in the semi-finals	F	lost in the final	W	won the tournament
DNQ	did not qualify for the tournament	A	did not participate in the tournament	WD	withdrew from the tournament

NH / Not Held	means an event was not held.
NR / Non-Ranking Event	means an event is/was no longer a ranking event.
R / Ranking Event	means an event is/was a ranking event.
MR / Minor-Ranking Event	means an event is/was a minor-ranking event.

== Career finals ==
=== Non-ranking finals: 2 (1 title) ===
Outcome	No.	Year	Championship	Opponent in the final	Score
Winner	1.	2000	Challenge Tour – Event 2	(England) Luke Fisher	6–3
Runner-up	1.	2001	Challenge Tour – Event 3	(England) Shaun Murphy	3–6

=== Pro-am finals: 3 (3 titles) ===
Outcome	No.	Year	Championship	Opponent in the final	Score
Winner	1.	2007	Pontins Pro-Am – Event 1	(England) Craig Steadman	4–2
Winner	2.	2009	Pontins Pro-Am – Event 1	(England) Mitchell Mann	5–2
Winner	3.	2018	Pink Ribbon	(England) Harvey Chandler	4–2

=== Amateur finals: 2 ===
Outcome	No.	Year	Championship	Opponent in the final	Score
Runner-up	1.	1999	English Amateur Championship	(England) David Lilley	5–8
Runner-up	2.	2018	English Amateur Championship (2)	(England) Joe O'Connor	3–10

=== Seniors finals: 3 (3 titles) ===
Outcome	No.	Year	Championship	Opponent in the final	Score
Winner	1.	2024	Senior Tour – Event 4	(Wales) Philip Williams	4–3
Winner	2.	2024	Senior Tour – Event 5	(England) Dean Galbally	4–3
Winner	3.	2024	Senior Tour – Event 6	(Northern Ireland) Gerard Greene	4–2
