= Dave Harold =

English snooker player (born 1966)

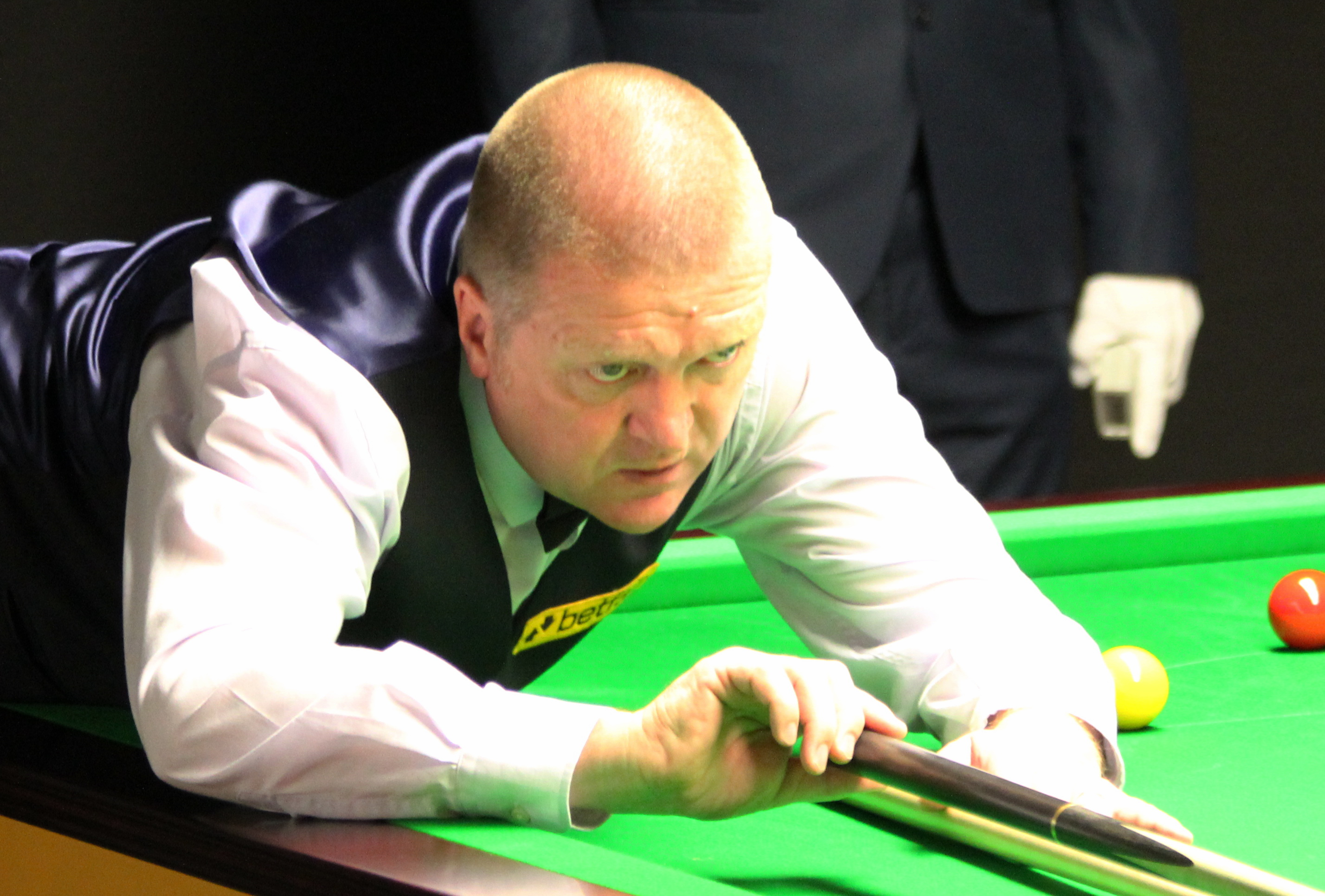
- Harold at the 2012 Paul Hunter Classic

Personal information
- Nickname: The Stoke Potter
- Born: 9 December 1966 (age 59) Stoke-on-Trent, England

Sport
- Country: England
- Sport: Snooker
- Professional: 1991–2015
- Highest ranking: 11 (1996/1997)
- Century breaks: 143

Tournament wins
- Ranking: 1

David William Harold (born 9 December 1966) is an English former professional snooker player from Stoke-on-Trent. He was known by the nicknames of "the Hard Man" and "the Stoke Potter" (conflating his home city's pottery industry and his profession of potting snooker balls). As an amateur he played as David Harold, but after turning professional in 1991 he was registered as Dave Harold.

He won one ranking title, reached two further finals and several semi-finals, and spent four seasons ranked among the top 16. He compiled 143 century breaks. Steve Davis has commented that he is not the most naturally gifted player, but makes up for this with strong tactical play. For his technique and grinding play he has been compared to Cliff Thorburn.

== Career ==
=== Early career ===
Soon after turning professional, Harold won the 1993 Asian Open, beating Darren Morgan 9–3 in the final. Ranked 93rd in the world at the time, he became the lowest-ranked player ever to win a ranking tournament. He never repeated this achievement, although he reached his second ranking final in the 1994 Grand Prix, losing 6–9 to John Higgins.

=== Top 16 (1996–2002) ===
After 1994, Harold did not reach a third ranking final until 2008, although he reached a total of ten semi-finals in ranking tournaments, and was a Top-16 player for four seasons between 1995/1996 and 2001/2002, reaching a career-best position of No. 11 in the world rankings in the 1996/97 season. In the 1996 Welsh Open, he lost in the semi-finals, 1–6, to eventual winner Mark Williams.

He competed in his first and only World Championship quarter-final in the 1996 event, where he lost 7–13 to Nigel Bond. He also lost 5–6 to Bond in his 1996 British Open semi-final less than two weeks earlier.

In the 1998 Grand Prix, he knocked out Stephen Hendry and John Higgins en route to the semi-finals, but lost narrowly to eventual champion Stephen Lee. 1998 also saw him reach his first semi-final in the UK Championship, where he was defeated 9–7 by Matthew Stevens.

In the 1999 Grand Prix Harold led Mark Williams 5–3 in the semi-finals but lost 5–6. This was Harold's last ranking semi-final until 2008, although he also reached the semis in the non-ranking 2001 Masters, defeating John Higgins and John Parrott, but losing his semi-final 5–6 to eventual runner-up Fergal O'Brien after having trailed 5–1.

=== 2003–2015 ===
Following a poor season in 2001–2002, Harold dropped out of the Top 16, down to number 29 in the World Rankings. A broken wrist sustained on New Year's Eve 2003 saw him drop further down the rankings, out of the top 32, although he had a better 2005/2006 season. Another consistent season in 2006/2007 helped Harold back up to No. 30 in the world rankings for 2007/2008.

2007/2008 started with a quarter-final appearance in the Shanghai Masters, losing to eventual winner Dominic Dale. Harold did not get past the round robin phase of the Grand Prix, finishing fifth in his group of six players; but in the 2007 UK Championship, Harold eliminated World Number 2 Graeme Dott 9–7 in the first round to achieve a place in the last 16 of the tournament for the first time since 1999. However, he lost 2–9 in the second round to Mark Selby. He qualified for the final stages of the World Championship with a 10–4 win over Mike Dunn, but lost 10–3 at the Crucible in the first round proper to Shaun Murphy.

Harold retained his Top 32 ranking, and started the 2008–09 season ranked at #28, his highest ranking since 2003. In the first ranking event of the new season, the 2008 Northern Ireland Trophy, he beat Ricky Walden 5–2, Graeme Dott 5–3, Stephen Lee 5–4 and defending champion Stephen Maguire to reach the semi-finals, his first appearance at that stage of a ranking event for five years. He then moved into a 5–1 lead against John Higgins and won 6–4, to reach his first final since 1994, which he lost 9–3 to Ronnie O'Sullivan. Harold's performance in this tournament moved him up to 14th in the provisional world rankings. Harold remarked after the final that, aside from claiming the World Championship, his one other remaining ambition in the game is to score a victory over O'Sullivan, who he has never beaten in a ranking tournament. The 2008 Northern Ireland Trophy marked his tenth consecutive failure to do so.

Harold subsequently qualified for the 2008 Shanghai Masters and Grand Prix. In the former, he defeated home favourite Ding Junhui in the last 32, before losing 4–5 (from 3–0 and 4–1 up) against Steve Davis; however, in the latter he was eliminated in the first round by Ali Carter. A less successful run of results in the second half of the season saw him fall out of the Top 16 in the provisional rankings, largely due to his failure to qualify for the 2009 World Championship, although he started the 2009/2010 season ranked at No. 19, an improvement of nine places on the previous season.

Harold appeared in the Welsh Open in January 2010 but lost in the first round 5–1 to Stephen Hendry. In September he beat Shaun Murphy 3–0 in the newly formed World Open in Glasgow but subsequently lost in the next round to Jamie Cope 3–2.

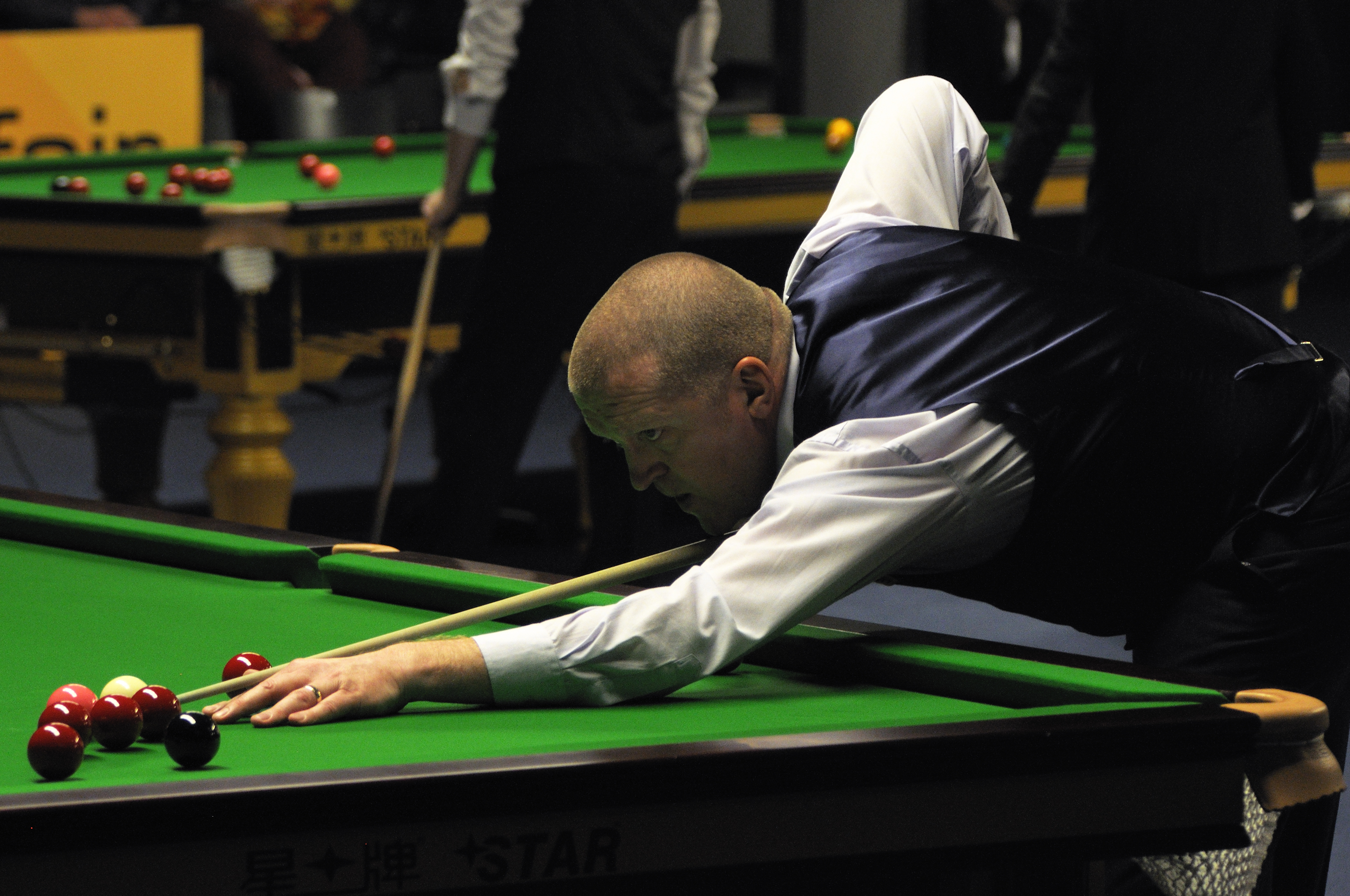
Dave Harold at 2013 German Masters.

The 2012–13 season saw Harold win 2 qualifying matches to reach the main stages of the 2012 Wuxi Classic, however, he lost his wildcard match to Chinese player Rouzi Maimaiti. Harold subsequently failed to qualify for the next four ranking events, losing to players such as Ali Carter, Barry Hawkins, and Cao Yupeng. He did, however, qualify for the German Masters, beating Craig Steadman 5–3 and Ryan Day 5–4 to qualify for the Last 32 of the event, where he lost 3–5 to former world champion Graeme Dott. He only won 1 more match in ranking event qualifiers for the rest of the season, culminating with a 9–10 defeat the Alfie Burden in qualifying for the World Championship. Harold played in many of the Players Tour Championship event throughout the season, his best results being three Last 16 appearances, and a further two Last 32 results, finishing 39th on the Order of Merit, outside of the Top 26 that qualified for the Finals.

Harold started the 2013–14 season ranked 50th in the world rankings. He retired in May 2015 after suffering from eyesight problems.

== Performance and rankings timeline ==
| Tournament | 1990/ 91 | 1991/ 92 | 1992/ 93 | 1993/ 94 | 1994/ 95 | 1995/ 96 | 1996/ 97 | 1997/ 98 | 1998/ 99 | 1999/ 00 | 2000/ 01 | 2001/ 02 | 2002/ 03 | 2003/ 04 | 2004/ 05 | 2005/ 06 | 2006/ 07 | 2007/ 08 | 2008/ 09 | 2009/ 10 | 2010/ 11 | 2011/ 12 | 2012/ 13 | 2013/ 14 | 2014/ 15 |
|---|---|---|---|---|---|---|---|---|---|---|---|---|---|---|---|---|---|---|---|---|---|---|---|---|---|
| Ranking (Note: From the 2010/2011 season it shows the ranking at the beginning of the season.) | (Note: He was an amateur.) | (Note: New players on the Main Tour do not have a ranking.) | 93 | 50 | 19 | 13 | 11 | 18 | 19 | 17 | 13 | 15 | 21 | 23 | 34 | 45 | 35 | 30 | 28 | 19 | 31 | 48 | 48 | 50 | 60 |
Ranking tournaments
| Wuxi Classic (Note: The event ran under different name as Jiangsu Classic (2008/2009 to 2009/2010).) | Tournament Not Held | | | | | | | | | | | | | | | | | | Non-Ranking Event | | | | WR | A | LQ |
| Australian Goldfields Open (Note: The event ran under different names such as Australian Open (1994/1995) and Australian Open (1995/1996).) | Tournament Not Held | | | | NR | | Tournament Not Held | | | | | | | | | | | | | | | LQ | LQ | A | LQ |
| Shanghai Masters | Tournament Not Held | | | | | | | | | | | | | | | | | QF | 2R | LQ | 1R | LQ | LQ | LQ | LQ |
| International Championship | Tournament Not Held | | | | | | | | | | | | | | | | | | | | | | LQ | 1R | A |
| UK Championship | A | LQ | LQ | 2R | QF | 1R | 1R | 1R | SF | QF | 3R | 2R | 2R | 2R | LQ | 1R | 2R | 2R | LQ | LQ | LQ | LQ | LQ | 2R | 1R |
| German Masters (Note: The event ran under different name as German Open (1995/1996 to 1997/1998).) | Tournament Not Held | | | | | 1R | QF | 1R | NR | Tournament Not Held | | | | | | | | | | | LQ | LQ | 1R | LQ | LQ |
| Welsh Open | A | LQ | LQ | QF | 2R | SF | 1R | 2R | 1R | 2R | 1R | 1R | 1R | WD | LQ | 1R | 3R | 2R | 1R | 1R | 2R | LQ | LQ | 2R | 2R |
| Indian Open | Tournament Not Held | | | | | | | | | | | | | | | | | | | | | | | LQ | LQ |
| Players Championship Finals (Note: The event ran under different name as Players Tour Championship Grand Finals (2010/2011 to 2012/2013).) | Tournament Not Held | | | | | | | | | | | | | | | | | | | | DNQ | DNQ | DNQ | DNQ | DNQ |
| China Open (Note: The event ran under different names as China International (1997/1998 and 1998/1999)) | Tournament Not Held | | | | | | | NR | LQ | 1R | 1R | 2R | Not Held | | 2R | WR | LQ | 1R | 2R | LQ | LQ | LQ | LQ | 1R | A |
| World Championship | A | LQ | LQ | 2R | 1R | QF | 1R | 1R | LQ | 1R | 2R | 1R | LQ | LQ | LQ | 1R | LQ | 1R | LQ | LQ | 1R | LQ | LQ | LQ | A |
Non-ranking tournaments
| The Masters | A | LQ | LQ | LQ | LQ | 1R | 1R | LQ | LQ | LQ | SF | WR | LQ | LQ | A | LQ | LQ | LQ | LQ | LQ | A | A | A | A | A |
| Championship League | Tournament Not Held | | | | | | | | | | | | | | | | | RR | RR | RR | A | A | A | A | A |
| World Seniors Championship | NH | A | Tournament Not Held | | | | | | | | | | | | | | | | | | LQ | A | LQ | SF | LQ |
| Shoot-Out | A | Tournament Not Held | | | | | | | | | | | | | | | | | | | 1R | SF | 3R | 1R | 1R |
Former ranking tournaments
| Classic | A | LQ | Tournament Not Held | | | | | | | | | | | | | | | | | | | | | | |
| Strachan Open | A | LQ | Tournament Not Held | | | | | | | | | | | | | | | | | | | | | | |
| Dubai Classic (Note: The event run under different names such as Thailand Classic (1995/1996) and Asian Classic (1996/1997)) | A | LQ | LQ | LQ | LQ | 1R | 2R | Tournament Not Held | | | | | | | | | | | | | | | | | |
| Malta Grand Prix | Tournament Not Held | | | | Non-Ranking Event | | | | | LQ | NR | Tournament Not Held | | | | | | | | | | | | | |
| Thailand Masters (Note: The event ran under different names such as Asian Open (1991/1992 to 1992/1993) and Thailand Open (1993/1994 to 1996/1997).) | A | LQ | W | 2R | LQ | 1R | 2R | 1R | 1R | 1R | 1R | 2R | NR | Not Held | | | NR | Tournament Not Held | | | | | | | |
| Scottish Open (Note: The event ran under different names such as International Open (1991/1992 to 1996/1997), Matchroom Trophy (1985/1986) and Players Championship (2003/2004).) | A | NH | SF | 1R | 2R | QF | 3R | 1R | 3R | QF | 2R | QF | 3R | 1R | Tournament Not Held | | | | | | | | MR | Not Held | |
| British Open | A | LQ | LQ | 3R | QF | SF | QF | 3R | 1R | 1R | 3R | 3R | 1R | 1R | 1R | Tournament Not Held | | | | | | | | | |
| Irish Masters | Non-Ranking Event | | | | | | | | | | | | SF | WD | QF | NH | NR | Tournament Not Held | | | | | | | |
| Northern Ireland Trophy (Note: The tournament was known as Northern Ireland Classic (1981/1982)) | Tournament Not Held | | | | | | | | | | | | | NR | LQ | 1R | F | Tournament Not Held | | | | | | | |
| Malta Cup (Note: The event ran under different names such as European Open (1991/1992 to 1996/1997 and 2001/2002 to 2003/2004) and Irish Open (1998/1999).) | A | LQ | LQ | LQ | QF | QF | 1R | NH | 1R | Not Held | | 1R | 1R | LQ | LQ | LQ | LQ | NR | Tournament Not Held | | | | | | |
| Bahrain Championship | Tournament Not Held | | | | | | | | | | | | | | | | | | 1R | Tournament Not Held | | | | | |
| World Open (Note: The event ran under different names such as LG Cup (2001/2002 to 2003/2004), Grand Prix (1991/1992 to 2000/2001 and 2004/2005 to 2009/2010), the World Open (2010/2011) and the Haikou World Open (2011/2012–2013/2014).) | A | 2R | 1R | 3R | F | 1R | 1R | 3R | SF | SF | 2R | 3R | 1R | 2R | LQ | 2R | LQ | RR | 1R | LQ | 1R | LQ | LQ | LQ | NH |
Former non-ranking tournaments
| World Masters | 1R | Tournament Not Held | | | | | | | | | | | | | | | | | | | | | | | |
| Irish Masters | A | A | A | A | 1R | A | A | A | A | A | A | A | Ranking Event | | | NH | A | Tournament Not Held | | | | | | | |
| Malta Grand Prix | Tournament Not Held | | | | A | QF | A | A | A | R | A | Tournament Not Held | | | | | | | | | | | | | |
| Charity Challenge | Tournament Not Held | | | | | | A | 1R | A | A | A | A | A | A | Tournament Not Held | | | | | | | | | | |
| Scottish Masters | A | A | A | A | A | A | A | A | A | A | LQ | LQ | A | Tournament Not Held | | | | | | | | | | | |
| Thailand Masters | Ranking Event | | | | | | | | | | | | 1R | Not Held | | | A | Tournament Not Held | | | | | | | |
| Masters Qualifying Event (Note: The event was also called the Benson & Hedges Championship (1990/1991–2002/2003)) | A | LQ | NH | SF | A | A | A | 1R | F | 2R | A | A | 2R | QF | NH | 1R | 1R | 1R | 1R | 2R | Tournament Not Held | | | | |

Performance table legend
| LQ | lost in the qualifying draw | #R | lost in the early rounds of the tournament (WR = Wildcard round, RR = Round robin) | QF | lost in the quarter-finals |
| SF | lost in the semi–finals | F | lost in the final | W | won the tournament |
| DNQ | did not qualify for the tournament | A | did not participate in the tournament | WD | withdrew from the tournament |

| NH / Not Held | means an event was not held. |
| NR / Non-Ranking Event | means an event is/was no longer a ranking event. |
| R / Ranking Event | means an event is/was a ranking event. |
| MR / Minor-Ranking Event | means an event is/was a minor-ranking event. |

== Career finals ==
=== Ranking finals: 3 (1 title) ===
| Outcome | No. | Year | Championship | Opponent in the final | Score |
|---|---|---|---|---|---|
| Winner | 1. | 1993 | Asian Open | (Wales) Darren Morgan | 9–3 |
| Runner-up | 1. | 1994 | Grand Prix | (Scotland) John Higgins | 6–9 |
| Runner-up | 2. | 2008 | Northern Ireland Trophy | (England) Ronnie O'Sullivan | 3–9 |

=== Non-ranking finals: 2 (1 title) ===
| Outcome | No. | Year | Championship | Opponent in the final | Score |
|---|---|---|---|---|---|
| Winner | 1. | 1993 | Merseyside Professional Championship | (England) Tony Rampello | 5–3 |
| Runner-up | 1. | 1998 | Benson & Hedges Championship | (England) David Gray | 6–9 |

=== Pro-am finals: 6 (3 titles) ===
| Outcome | No. | Year | Championship | Opponent in the final | Score |
|---|---|---|---|---|---|
| Runner-up | 1. | 2005 | Pontins Autumn Open | (Northern Ireland) Joe Swail | 3–5 |
| Runner-up | 2. | 2006 | Pontins Pro-Am - Event 5 | (England) Ben Woollaston | 1–4 |
| Winner | 1. | 2006 | Pontins Pro-Am - Event 6 | (Wales) Ryan Day | 4−1 |
| Runner-up | 3. | 2006 | Swiss Open | (England) Matthew Couch | 3–4 |
| Winner | 2. | 2007 | Pontins Pro-Am - Event 6 | (England) Judd Trump | 4–3 |
| Winner | 3. | 2007 | Swiss Open | (Republic of Ireland) Ken Doherty | 5–0 |
