= 2008 World Snooker Championship =

Professional snooker tournament

2008 888.com World Snooker Championship

Tournament information
- Dates: 19 April – 5 May 2008
- Venue: Crucible Theatre
- City: Sheffield
- Country: England
- Organisation: WPBSA
- Format: Ranking event
- Total prize fund: £1,050,000
- Winner's share: £250,000
- Highest break: Ronnie O'Sullivan (ENG) (147); Ali Carter (ENG) (147)

Final
- Champion: Ronnie O'Sullivan (ENG)
- Runner-up: Ali Carter (ENG)
- Score: 18–8

The 2008 World Snooker Championship (also referred to as the 2008 888.com World Snooker Championship for the purposes of sponsorship) was a professional snooker tournament that took place between 19 April and 5 May 2008 at the Crucible Theatre in Sheffield, England. It was the 32nd consecutive year that the World Snooker Championship was held at the Crucible Theatre, and the seventh and final ranking event of the 2007–08 snooker season. Organised by World Snooker and sponsored by betting company 888.com, the tournament featured a total prize fund of £1,050,000, with £250,000 awarded to the winner.

Qualifying for the event took place between 6 and 11 January at Pontin's in Prestatyn, Wales. Sixteen players progressed from a four-round qualification tournament to meet a further sixteen seeded players. John Higgins was the defending champion who had won his second championship the previous year, defeating Mark Selby in the final 18–13. At the 2008 event, Higgins lost in the second round 9–13 to Ryan Day. Ronnie O'Sullivan won the tournament, defeating Ali Carter 18–8 in the final to win his 20th ranking title.

== Overview ==
The World Snooker Championship is an annual cue sport tournament and the official world championship of the game of snooker. Founded in the late 19th century by British Army soldiers stationed in India, the sport became popular in Great Britain. In modern times it has been played worldwide, especially in East and Southeast Asian nations such as China, Hong Kong and Thailand. The 2008 event was sponsored by 888.com.

In the 2008 tournament, 32 professional players competed in one-on-one snooker matches played over several frames, using a single-elimination tournament format. The 32 players were selected for the event using the snooker world rankings and a pre-tournament qualification competition. In 1927, the first world championship was won by Joe Davis. The event's final took place in Camkin's Hall, Birmingham, England. Since 1977, the event has been held at the Crucible Theatre in Sheffield, England. The event was organised by the World Professional Billiards and Snooker Association. The defending champion was Scottish player John Higgins, who had defeated Mark Selby 18–13 in the previous year's final.

=== Format ===
The 2008 World Snooker Championship took place from 19 April to 5 May 2008 in Sheffield, England. The tournament was the last of seven ranking events in the 2007–08 snooker season on the World Snooker Tour. It featured a 32-player main draw held at the Crucible Theatre, as well as a qualifying draw that was played at Prestatyn Sands Pontin's from 6 to 11 January. This was the 32nd consecutive year that the tournament had been staged at the Crucible.

The top 16 players in the latest world rankings automatically qualified for the main draw as seeded players. (Note: In the event of the defending champion being ranked outside the top 16, he would replace the player ranked world number 16 as an automatic qualifier.) John Higgins was seeded first overall as the defending champion, and the remaining 15 seeds were allocated based on the latest world rankings. The number of frames required to win a match increased throughout the tournament. The first round consisted of best-of-19-frames matches, and the final match was played over a maximum of 35 frames. All 16 non-seeded spots in the main draw were filled with players from the qualifying rounds. The event was broadcast by the BBC and Eurosport in Europe.

=== Prize fund ===
The breakdown of prize money for this year is shown below:

- Winner: £250,000
- Runner-up: £125,000
- Semi-final: £52,000
- Quarter-final: £22,000
- Last 16: £14,000
- Last 32: £10,600
- Last 48: £7,400
- Last 64: £4,500
- Stage one highest break: £1,000
- Stage two highest break: £10,000
- Stage one maximum break: £5,000
- Stage two maximum break: £147,000
- Total: £1,050,000

== Tournament summary ==
=== Early rounds ===
The first round was played between 20 and 24 April as the best of 19 frames, held over two sessions. Defending champion John Higgins defeated Matthew Stevens 10–5, but the 2007 runner-up Mark Selby was knocked out by qualifier Mark King 10–8. Ding Junhui's 10–9 victory over Marco Fu was his first ever win at the Crucible. Stephen Maguire took the first eight frames of his first-round match against Anthony Hamilton, before Hamilton won frame nine. Maguire won the match 10–3. Three players were making their debuts at the event; Jamie Cope, Liu Chuang and Liang Wenbo. One of the three debutants, Wenbo, progressed to the second round as he defeated Ken Doherty 10–5. The defeat caused Doherty to drop out of the top 16 of the world rankings for the first time since the 1992–93 season. Cope lost in a deciding frame to Peter Ebdon, despite having led 5–2 earlier in the match.

The second round was played from 24 to 28 April as the best of 25 frames, held over three sessions. Defending champion Higgins was defeated by Ryan Day 9–13. This was the first time Day had progressed to the quarter-finals at the event. Ronnie O'Sullivan made a maximum break against Mark Williams in the final frame of his 13–7 win. The achievement made O'Sullivan the first player to have scored three 147s at the venue. Williams, ranked 12th in the world before the tournament, fell out of the top 16 after his second-round loss. Hendry reached the quarter-finals for the 17th time in his career, after a 13–7 win over Ding Junhui. Maguire also won the first eight frames of his second-round clash with Neil Robertson, which he won 13–7. Leading 12–10, Liang Wenbo punched the air in celebration as he potted match ball. However, his opponent, Joe Swail earned the snookers he required to win the frame and also won the next to force the match into a deciding frame. Swail missed a brown ball, allowing Wenbo to win the match 13–12. Afterwards, Swail complained bitterly that in the final frame the referee had incorrectly replaced the cue ball after calling a miss, giving Liang an easier escape from a snooker. He also accused Liang of unprofessional conduct for not pointing out the referee's mistake.

=== Later rounds (quarter-finals, semi-finals, final) ===
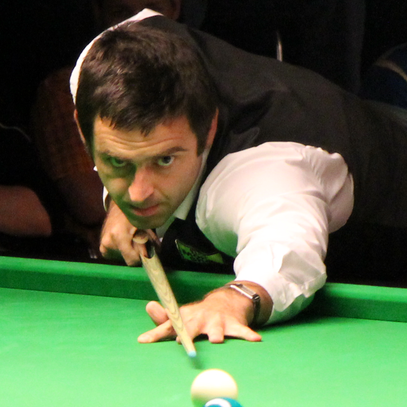
Ronnie O'Sullivan (pictured in 2011) won his third World Championship.

The quarter-finals were played on 29 and 30 April as the best of 25 frames held over three sessions. Carter made a maximum break in his 13–9 win over Ebdon. His opponent came very close to a maximum of his own just a frame earlier, but narrowly missed the 15th black. Just minutes before, on the other table, Stephen Hendry attempted a maximum of his own but also missed the 15th red. Hendry reached the 12th Crucible semi-final of his career after a 13–7 win over Day, setting a record for one-table appearances that stood until Ronnie O'Sullivan reached his 13th semi-final in 2025. Wenbo was the first player from mainland China to reach the quarter-finals of the World Championship, but he lost 7–13 to O'Sullivan. Perry defeated Maguire 13–12 on a deciding frame.

The semi-finals were played from 1 to 3 May as the best of 33 frames. After tying the first session 4–4, O'Sullivan completed an 8–0 whitewash over Hendry in their second session and won the first frame of session three, meaning that O'Sullivan had won twelve consecutive frames from 1–4 down to 13–4 in front. At one stage in the match, O'Sullivan had scored 448 points without reply. This was the first time Hendry had lost every frame in a full session at the Crucible. O'Sullivan won the match 17–6 with a session to spare. Carter reached his first ranking final by defeating Perry 17–15.

The final was played on 4 and 5 May between O'Sullivan and Carter. Both finalists were English for the first time since the 1991 event, when John Parrott defeated Jimmy White 18–11. O'Sullivan led 11–5 after the first day's play and won the match 18–8. This was O'Sullivan's third World Championship win, as he joined Steve Davis and Hendry in having won more than two world titles at the Crucible; it was the 20th ranking title of his professional career. In post-match interviews, both players admitted to not having played particularly well, with O'Sullivan commenting "Ali and I are disappointed not to put on a better performance". Carter's performance was described as "jaded". The win also gave O'Sullivan the top spot in the world rankings.

== Main draw ==
Shown below are the results for each round. The numbers in parentheses beside some of the players are their seeding ranks.

First round Best of 19 frames
19 April
(Scotland) John Higgins (1)	10
(Wales) Matthew Stevens	5
20 & 21 April
(Wales) Ryan Day (16)	10
(Republic of Ireland) Michael Judge	6
22 April
(China) Ding Junhui (9)	10
(Hong Kong) Marco Fu	9
20 & 21 April
(Scotland) Stephen Hendry (8)	10
(Northern Ireland) Mark Allen	9
23 & 24 April
(England) Ronnie O'Sullivan (5)	10
(China) Liu Chuang	5
21 & 22 April
(Wales) Mark Williams (12)	10
(England) Mark Davis	3
19 & 20 April
(England) Stephen Lee (13)	4
(Northern Ireland) Joe Swail	10
23 April
(Republic of Ireland) Ken Doherty (4)	5
(China) Liang Wenbo	10
22 & 23 April
(England) Shaun Murphy (3)	10
(England) Dave Harold	3
19 & 20 April
(England) Ali Carter (14)	10
(England) Barry Hawkins	9
21 & 22 April
(England) Mark Selby (11)	8
(England) Mark King	10
19 & 20 April
(England) Peter Ebdon (6)	10
(England) Jamie Cope	9
19 & 20 April
(Australia) Neil Robertson (7)	10
(England) Nigel Bond	4
23 & 24 April
(Scotland) Stephen Maguire (10)	10
(England) Anthony Hamilton	3
21 April
(England) Steve Davis (15)	8
(England) Stuart Bingham	10
22 & 23 April
(Scotland) Graeme Dott (2)	7
(England) Joe Perry	10

Second round Best of 25 frames
24, 25 & 26 April
(Scotland) John Higgins (1)	9
(Wales) Ryan Day (16)	13
25 & 26 April
(China) Ding Junhui (9)	7
(Scotland) Stephen Hendry (8)	13
26, 27 & 28 April
(England) Ronnie O'Sullivan (5)	13
(Wales) Mark Williams (12)	7
27 & 28 April
(Northern Ireland) Joe Swail	12
(China) Liang Wenbo	13
25 & 26 April
(England) Shaun Murphy (3)	4
(England) Ali Carter (14)	13
24 & 25 April
(England) Mark King	9
(England) Peter Ebdon (6)	13
26, 27 & 28 April
(Australia) Neil Robertson (7)	7
(Scotland) Stephen Maguire (10)	13
27 & 28 April
(England) Stuart Bingham	9
(England) Joe Perry	13

Quarter-finals; Best of 25 frames
29 & 30 April
(Wales) Ryan Day (16)	7
(Scotland) Stephen Hendry (8)	13
29 & 30 April
(England) Ronnie O'Sullivan (5)	13
(China) Liang Wenbo	7
29 & 30 April
(England) Ali Carter (14)	13
(England) Peter Ebdon (6)	9
29 & 30 April
(Scotland) Stephen Maguire (10)	12
(England) Joe Perry	13

Semi-finals; Best of 33 frames
1 & 2 May
(Scotland) Stephen Hendry (8)	6
(England) Ronnie O'Sullivan (5)	17
1, 2 & 3 May
(England) Ali Carter (14)	17
(England) Joe Perry	15

Final; Best of 35 frames
4 & 5 May
(England) Ronnie O'Sullivan (5)	18
(England) Ali Carter (14)	8

=== Final: frame scores ===
Final (Best of 35 frames) Crucible Theatre, Sheffield, 4 May & 5 May 2008. Referee: Jan Verhaas
Ronnie O'Sullivan (5)
England
18–8
Ali Carter (14)
England
81–56, 127–0, 99–0, 0–104, 86–4, 62–76, 65–18, 73–0, 78–0, 36–60, 86–4, 28–93, 45–80, 123–0, 77–32, 110–5, 66–48, 74–0, 25–64, 85–0, 0–84, 58–42, 4–89, 68–39, 75–32, 62–16
Century breaks: 2
(O'Sullivan 1, Carter 1)

Highest break by O'Sullivan: 106
Highest break by Carter: 104

81–56, 127–0, 99–0, 0–104, 86–4, 62–76, 65–18, 73–0, 78–0, 36–60, 86–4, 28–93, 45–80, 123–0, 77–32, 110–5, 66–48, 74–0, 25–64, 85–0, 0–84, 58–42, 4–89, 68–39, 75–32, 62–16
(England) Ronnie O'Sullivan wins the 2008 888.com World Snooker Championship

== Qualification ==
=== Preliminary qualifying ===
The preliminary qualifying rounds for the tournament took place at Pontin's in Prestatyn, Wales between 3 and 5 January 2008.

Round 1

(England) Phil Seaton	5–2	(Wales) Donald Newcombe

Round 2

(England) Colin Mitchell	5–4	(England) Phil Seaton
(England) Les Dodd	1–5	(India) David Singh
(England) Adam Osbourne	0–5	(England) Sean Storey
(England) Tony Knowles	5–1	(England) Ali Bassiri
(England) Neil Selman	5–1	(England) John Wilson
(England) Ian Stark	5–4	(England) Del Smith
(England) Tony Brown	5–1	(England) Christopher Flight
(England) Stephen Ormerod	w/o–w/d	(England) Paul Wykes

Round 3

(England) Colin Mitchell	5–3	(India) David Singh
(England) Sean Storey	5–0	(England) Tony Knowles
(England) Neil Selman	4–5	(England) Ian Stark
(England) Tony Brown	3–5	(England) Stephen Ormerod

=== Qualifying ===
The qualifying rounds 1–4 for the tournament took place at Pontin's in Prestatyn, Wales between 6 and 11 January 2008. The final round of qualifying took place at the English Institute of Sport in Sheffield between 7 and 10 March.

Round 1

(Northern Ireland) Patrick Wallace	10–1	(England) Sean Storey
(England) Jimmy Robertson	10–5	(England) Stephen Ormerod
(Republic of Ireland) Rodney Goggins	10–4	(England) Ian Stark
(China) Liu Chuang	10–0	(England) Colin Mitchell

Rounds 2–5

Round 2 Best of 19 frames
(England) Alex Davies	10
(Australia) Steve Mifsud	2
(England) Mark Joyce	10
(Northern Ireland) Patrick Wallace	8
(Scotland) James McBain	10
(Belgium) Kevin Van Hove	2
(China) Tian Pengfei	10
(England) Ashley Wright	4
(England) Munraj Pal	8
(China) Xiao Guodong	10
(England) Matthew Selt	10
(Scotland) Fraser Patrick	6
(China) Liu Song	10
(England) Jimmy Robertson	6
(Norway) Kurt Maflin	9
(Wales) Gareth Coppack	10
(England) Shailesh Jogia	4
(Wales) Michael White	10
(England) Lee Spick	9
(Republic of Ireland) Rodney Goggins	10
(England) Jamie O'Neill	8
(England) Martin Gould	10
(China) Liang Wenbo	10
(England) Ben Woollaston	3
(Wales) Lee Walker	9
(China) Liu Chuang	10
(Republic of Ireland) Leo Fernandez	10
(England) Alfred Burden	4
(Republic of Ireland) David Morris	9
(Thailand) Supoj Saenla	10
(Malta) Tony Drago	9
(Thailand) I Kachaiwong	10

Round 3 Best of 19 frames
(Wales) Ian Preece	10
(England) Alex Davies	9
(England) Jimmy Michie	10
(England) Mark Joyce	4
(Scotland) Marcus Campbell	9
(Scotland) James McBain	10
(England) Mike Dunn	10
(China) Tian Pengfei	2
(England) David Roe	10
(China) Xiao Guodong	5
(England) Jimmy White	10
(England) Matthew Selt	4
(Scotland) Scott MacKenzie	10
(China) Liu Song	5
(Wales) Paul Davies	8
(Wales) Gareth Coppack	10
(England) Barry Pinches	10
(Wales) Michael White	4
(England) Judd Trump	10
(Republic of Ireland) Rodney Goggins	4
(England) Stuart Pettman	4
(England) Martin Gould	10
(England) Rod Lawler	6
(China) Liang Wenbo	10
(Republic of Ireland) Joe Delaney	5
(China) Liu Chuang	10
(Scotland) Drew Henry	2
(Republic of Ireland) Leo Fernandez	10
(Finland) Robin Hull
(Thailand) Supoj Saenla	W/O
(England) Tom Ford	5
(Thailand) I Kachaiwong	10

Round 4 Best of 19 frames
(England) Adrian Gunnell	10
(Wales) Ian Preece	9
(Republic of Ireland) Michael Judge	10
(England) Jimmy Michie	6
(Republic of Ireland) Fergal O'Brien	10
(Scotland) James McBain	4
(England) Andrew Norman	2
(England) Mike Dunn	10
(England) Andy Hicks	10
(England) David Roe	5
(England) Andrew Higginson	7
(England) Jimmy White	10
(Thailand) James Wattana	8
(Scotland) Scott MacKenzie	10
(England) John Parrott	10
(Wales) Gareth Coppack	3
(England) Robert Milkins	4
(England) Barry Pinches	10
(Scotland) Jamie Burnett	2
(England) Judd Trump	10
(England) Rory McLeod	10
(England) Martin Gould	8
(England) Dave Gilbert	3
(China) Liang Wenbo	10
(England) David Gray	5
(China) Liu Chuang	10
(England) Mark Davis	10
(Republic of Ireland) Leo Fernandez	9
(Scotland) Alan McManus	10
(Thailand) Supoj Saenla	2
(England) Ricky Walden	10
(Thailand) I Kachaiwong	4

Round 5 Best of 19 frames
(England) Stuart Bingham	10
(England) Adrian Gunnell	3
(England) Michael Holt	6
(Republic of Ireland) Michael Judge	10
(England) Jamie Cope	10
(Republic of Ireland) Fergal O'Brien	5
(England) Dave Harold	10
(England) Mike Dunn	4
(England) Barry Hawkins	10
(England) Andy Hicks	8
(England) Mark King	10
(England) Jimmy White	3
(England) Anthony Hamilton	10
(Scotland) Scott MacKenzie	2
(England) Joe Perry	10
(England) John Parrott	8
(England) Nigel Bond	10
(England) Barry Pinches	7
(Northern Ireland) Joe Swail	10
(England) Judd Trump	9
(Wales) Matthew Stevens	10
(England) Rory McLeod	5
(England) Ian McCulloch	5
(China) Liang Wenbo	10
(Wales) Dominic Dale	9
(China) Liu Chuang	10
(Northern Ireland) Gerard Greene	2
(England) Mark Davis	10
(Hong Kong) Marco Fu	10
(Scotland) Alan McManus	3
(Northern Ireland) Mark Allen	10
(England) Ricky Walden	8

== Century breaks ==
=== Televised stage centuries ===
The highest break received a prize of £10,000, and a maximum break received a prize of £147,000 – a total of £157,000. This prize was shared, as two players made a 147, winning £78,500 each. In total there were 63 century breaks made at this year's world championships. O'Sullivan and Carter both made a maximum break during the event.

- 147, 140, 138, 135, 133, 126, 123, 109, 106, 102, 102, 100 – Ronnie O'Sullivan
- 147, 128, 128, 106, 104, 100 – Ali Carter
- 143, 113, 109, 103 – Peter Ebdon
- 140, 124, 112, 112, 110 – Stephen Hendry
- 137 – Stuart Bingham
- 133, 105 – Joe Swail
- 132, 127, 121, 110, 104, 102 – Joe Perry
- 131, 118, 112, 110, 100 – Stephen Maguire
- 126, 101 – Jamie Cope
- 126 – Graeme Dott
- 125 – Nigel Bond
- 123, 104 – Liang Wenbo
- 121, 116, 112 – Mark King
- 120, 103 – John Higgins
- 114, 113 – Ding Junhui
- 112 – Matthew Stevens
- 108 – Mark Selby
- 104 – Ryan Day
- 104 – Michael Judge
- 103, 100 – Marco Fu
- 102 – Mark Allen
- 102 – Anthony Hamilton
- 102 – Shaun Murphy

=== Qualifying stage centuries ===
The highest break in qualifying was a 139 made by Patrick Wallace.

- 139, 113, 103 – Patrick Wallace
- 138 – Leo Fernandez
- 138 – Gerard Greene
- 137 – Mark Davis
- 136, 112, 105, 101 – Liang Wenbo
- 135 – Rod Lawler
- 132, 110 – Dominic Dale
- 132, 103 – Andy Hicks
- 129, 100 – Alex Davies
- 127 – Xiao Guodong
- 126 – Robert Milkins
- 123, 107 – Matthew Stevens
- 122 – Rory McLeod
- 119 – Adrian Gunnell
- 118 – Michael White
- 116 – Marco Fu
- 112 – Jamie Burnett
- 112 – Fergal O'Brien
- 110 – Tom Ford
- 109 – Michael Judge
- 109 – Ian McCulloch
- 109 – Steve Mifsud
- 109 – Munraj Pal
- 108 – Liu Chuang
- 106 – David Roe
- 105 – Marcus Campbell
- 104 – Mark Allen
- 104 – Tian Pengfei
- 103 – Jamie O'Neill
- 102, 101, 100 – Ian Preece
- 101 – James McBain
- 101 – Joe Perry
- 101 – Jimmy White
- 100 – Anthony Hamilton
