= 2008 Welsh Open (snooker) =

Tournament information
- Dates: 11–17 February 2008
- Venue: Newport Centre
- City: Newport
- Country: Wales
- Organisation: WPBSA
- Format: Ranking event
- Total prize fund: £225,500
- Winner's share: £35,000
- Highest break: Ronnie O'Sullivan (ENG) (143)

Final
- Champion: Mark Selby (ENG)
- Runner-up: Ronnie O'Sullivan (ENG)
- Score: 9–8

The 2008 Welsh Open was a professional ranking snooker tournament that took place between 11 and 17 February 2008 in the Newport Centre in Newport, Wales.

Neil Robertson was the defending champion, but he lost his last 16 match against Ali Carter. Mark Selby won his first ranking title by defeating Ronnie O'Sullivan 9–8, after coming back from 5–8 down.

== Notable happenings ==
- Tian Pengfei won the last 3 frames to oust one of the Welsh favourites, Matthew Stevens 5–4.
- David Roe led John Higgins 3–1 before losing 3–5.
- Mark Williams won the last 3 frames to beat Marco Fu 5–4.
- Ali Carter led Neil Robertson 4–0 but won only 5–3.
- Ronnie O'Sullivan won the high break prize with a 143 in the last frame of his 6–3 semi-final victory over Shaun Murphy, surpassing an effort of 134 from Marcus Campbell.
- Mark Selby had a highest break of 77 in the final compared to O'Sullivan's 135.

== Prize fund ==
The breakdown of prize money for this year is shown below:

Winner: £35,000
Runner Up: £17,500
Semi Finalists: £8,750
Quarter Finalist: £6,500
Last 16: £4,275
Last 32: £2,750
Last 48: £1,725
Last 64: £1,325

Stage one highest break: £500
Stage two highest break: £2,000

Stage one maximum break: £1,000
Stage two maximum break: £20,000

Total: £225,500

== Main draw ==
=== Top half ===
Last 48; Best of 9 frames
22	(England) Jamie Cope	5
61	(England) Jimmy Michie	4
20	(Wales) Matthew Stevens	4
69	(China) Tian Pengfei	5
21	(England) Mark King	5
42	(England) Andrew Norman	1
17	(Northern Ireland) Joe Swail	2
51	(England) Judd Trump	5
18	(England) Joe Perry	5
39	(England) John Parrott	2
23	(England) Stuart Bingham	5
(England) Matthew Selt	2
27	(Hong Kong) Marco Fu	5
40	(England) Adrian Gunnell	3
28	(England) Ian McCulloch	5
57	(Scotland) Drew Henry	1

Last 32; Best of 9 frames
1	(Australia) Neil Robertson	5
22	(England) Jamie Cope	1
14	(England) Ali Carter	5
69	(China) Tian Pengfei	2
15	(England) Steve Davis	5
21	(England) Mark King	3
6	(England) Ronnie O'Sullivan	5
51	(England) Judd Trump	3
7	(England) Peter Ebdon	1
18	(England) Joe Perry	5
10	(Scotland) Stephen Maguire	4
23	(England) Stuart Bingham	5
12	(Wales) Mark Williams	5
27	(Hong Kong) Marco Fu	4
4	(England) Shaun Murphy	5
28	(England) Ian McCulloch	3

Last 16; Best of 9 frames
1	(Australia) Neil Robertson	3
14	(England) Ali Carter	5
15	(England) Steve Davis	3
6	(England) Ronnie O'Sullivan	5
18	(England) Joe Perry	5
23	(England) Stuart Bingham	2
12	(Wales) Mark Williams	2
4	(England) Shaun Murphy	5

Quarter-finals; Best of 9 frames
14	(England) Ali Carter	4
6	(England) Ronnie O'Sullivan	5
18	(England) Joe Perry	0
4	(England) Shaun Murphy	5

Semi-Finals; Best of 11 frames
6	(England) Ronnie O'Sullivan	6
4	(England) Shaun Murphy	3

=== Bottom half ===
Last 48; Best of 9 frames
25	(England) Nigel Bond	4
34	(Republic of Ireland) Michael Judge	5
26	(England) Anthony Hamilton	2
44	(England) Andrew Higginson	5
29	(Northern Ireland) Mark Allen	5
45	(England) David Gilbert	4
24	(England) Michael Holt	5
58	(Republic of Ireland) Joe Delaney	4
31	(Wales) Dominic Dale	2
38	(Scotland) Alan McManus	5
30	(England) Dave Harold	5
49	(England) Rod Lawler	4
32	(Northern Ireland) Gerard Greene	3
52	(Scotland) Marcus Campbell	5
19	(England) Barry Hawkins	2
55	(England) David Roe	5

Last 32; Best of 9 frames
3	(Scotland) Graeme Dott	4
34	(Republic of Ireland) Michael Judge	5
13	(England) Stephen Lee	5
44	(England) Andrew Higginson	3
16	(Wales) Ryan Day	5
29	(Northern Ireland) Mark Allen	2
8	(Scotland) Stephen Hendry	5
24	(England) Michael Holt	1
5	(Republic of Ireland) Ken Doherty	5
38	(Scotland) Alan McManus	3
11	(England) Mark Selby	5
30	(England) Dave Harold	2
9	(China) Ding Junhui	5
52	(Scotland) Marcus Campbell	4
2	(Scotland) John Higgins	5
55	(England) David Roe	3

Last 16; Best of 9 frames
34	(Republic of Ireland) Michael Judge	2
13	(England) Stephen Lee	5
16	(Wales) Ryan Day	4
8	(Scotland) Stephen Hendry	5
5	(Republic of Ireland) Ken Doherty	2
11	(England) Mark Selby	5
9	(China) Ding Junhui	1
2	(Scotland) John Higgins	5

Quarter-finals; Best of 9 frames
13	(England) Stephen Lee	2
8	(Scotland) Stephen Hendry	5
11	(England) Mark Selby	5
2	(Scotland) John Higgins	2

Semi-Finals; Best of 11 frames
8	(Scotland) Stephen Hendry	4
11	(England) Mark Selby	6

== Final ==
Final: Best of 17 frames. Referee: Eirian Williams. Newport Centre, Newport, Wales, 17 February 2008.
Ronnie O'Sullivan (6); England	8–9	Mark Selby (11); England
Afternoon: 6–90 (77), 50–60, 69–5 (50), 72–44, 23–56 (51), 62–35, 0–139 (70, 65), 130–0 (108); Evening: 97–0 (93), 135–6 (135), 22–72 (72), 87–35 (63), 69–1 (54), 0–89, 28–86 (62), 53–67 (O'Sullivan 53), 37–72
135	Highest break	77
2	Century breaks	0
7	50+ breaks	6

== Qualifying ==
Qualifying for the tournament took place at Pontin's in Prestatyn, Wales between 26 January and 28 January 2008.

Round 1 Best of 9 frames
(England) Joe Jogia	3
(England) Alfie Burden	5
(China) Tian Pengfei	5
(Australia) Steve Mifsud	3
(China) Liang Wenbo	5
(England) Ashley Wright	2
(Wales) Lee Walker	2
(England) Martin Gould	5
(Republic of Ireland) David Morris	5
(Wales) Gareth Coppack	1
(England) Matthew Selt	5
(England) Ben Woollaston	1
(China) Liu Song	5
(China) Xiao Guodong	2
(Republic of Ireland) Leo Fernandez	5
(Scotland) Fraser Patrick	2
(England) Munraj Pal	3
(Northern Ireland) Patrick Wallace	5
(Scotland) James McBain	3
(Republic of Ireland) Rodney Goggins	5
(Norway) Kurt Maflin	5
(Thailand) I Kachaiwong	4
(Malta) Tony Drago	5
(Belgium) Kevin Van Hove	1
(England) Mark Joyce	5
(England) Jimmy Robertson	4
(England) Jamie O'Neill	5
(China) Liu Chuang	2
(England) Lee Spick	5
(Thailand) Supoj Saenla	1
(England) Alex Davies	5
(Wales) Michael White	4

Round 2 Best of 9 frames
(England) Jimmy Michie	5
(England) Alfie Burden	2
(Scotland) Scott MacKenzie	4
(China) Tian Pengfei	5
(Wales) Paul Davies	1
(China) Liang Wenbo	5
(England) Judd Trump	5
(England) Martin Gould	1
(England) Mike Dunn	5
(Republic of Ireland) David Morris	2
(England) Barry Pinches	1
(England) Matthew Selt	5
(England) Tom Ford	5
(China) Liu Song	1
(Scotland) Drew Henry	5
(Republic of Ireland) Leo Fernandez	4
(England) Stuart Pettman	5
(Northern Ireland) Patrick Wallace	2
(England) Jimmy White	5
(Republic of Ireland) Rodney Goggins	1
(Wales) Ian Preece	5
(Norway) Kurt Maflin	1
(Republic of Ireland) Joe Delaney	5
(Malta) Tony Drago	4
(Finland) Robin Hull	w/d
(England) Mark Joyce	w/o
(England) Rod Lawler	5
(England) Jamie O'Neill	4
(Scotland) Marcus Campbell	5
(England) Lee Spick	4
(England) David Roe	5
(England) Alex Davies	0

Round 3 Best of 9 frames
(England) Robert Milkins	2
(England) Jimmy Michie	5
(England) Rory McLeod	3
(China) Tian Pengfei	5
(England) Andrew Norman	5
(China) Liang Wenbo	2
(England) Andy Hicks	2
(England) Judd Trump	5
(England) John Parrott	5
(England) Mike Dunn	4
(England) Mark Davis	3
(England) Matthew Selt	5
(England) Adrian Gunnell	5
(England) Tom Ford	2
(Republic of Ireland) Fergal O'Brien	4
(Scotland) Drew Henry	5
(Republic of Ireland) Michael Judge	5
(England) Stuart Pettman	2
(England) Andrew Higginson	5
(England) Jimmy White	2
(England) David Gilbert	5
(Wales) Ian Preece	1
(Scotland) Jamie Burnett	2
(Republic of Ireland) Joe Delaney	5
(Scotland) Alan McManus	5
(England) Mark Joyce	1
(Thailand) James Wattana	2
(England) Rod Lawler	5
(England) Ricky Walden	4
(Scotland) Marcus Campbell	5
(England) David Gray	1
(England) David Roe	5

== Century breaks ==
=== Main stage centuries ===
- 143, 135, 113, 108, 105, 101 – Ronnie O'Sullivan
- 134 – Marcus Campbell
- 133 – Ken Doherty
- 132, 115, 108, 107 – Joe Perry
- 130, 124 – Stephen Hendry
- 129, 108, 105 – Shaun Murphy
- 125, 114 – John Higgins
- 123, 112 – Judd Trump
- 123 – Stuart Bingham
- 117, 101 – Marco Fu
- 115 – Ding Junhui
- 114, 101 – Mark Selby
- 114, 100 – Mark Williams
- 112 – Michael Judge
- 109 – Stephen Maguire
- 107 – Jamie Cope
- 107 – Andrew Higginson
- 105, 102 – Ali Carter
- 103 – Dave Harold
- 102 – Rod Lawler
- 100 – Anthony Hamilton
- 100 – Neil Robertson

=== Qualifying stage centuries ===
- 134 – Stuart Pettman
- 128 – Munraj Pal
- 126 – Judd Trump
- 123 – Tony Drago
- 122 – Liang Wenbo
- 113 – Issara Kachaiwong
- 112 – Ian Preece
- 109 – Tom Ford
- 105 – David Roe
- 104 – Jimmy Michie
- 100 – Lee Walker
