= 2007 UK Championship =

2007 Maplin UK Championship
Tournament information
- Dates: 8–16 December 2007
- Venue: Telford International Centre
- City: Telford
- Country: England
- Organisation: WPBSA
- Format: Ranking event
- Total prize fund: £590,400
- Winner's share: £100,000
- Highest break: Ronnie O'Sullivan (ENG) (147)

Final
- Champion: Ronnie O'Sullivan (ENG)
- Runner-up: Stephen Maguire (SCO)
- Score: 10–2

The 2007 UK Championship (officially the 2007 Maplin UK Championship) was a professional ranking snooker tournament that took place between 8 and 16 December 2007 at the Telford International Centre in Telford, England.

Peter Ebdon was the defending champion but he lost 8–9 to Ian McCulloch in the Last 32.

In the final frame of his quarter-final match against Marco Fu, Mark Selby won the longest ever televised frame of snooker, which lasted 77 minutes. This beat the previous record of 74 minutes, which took place between Ebdon and Graeme Dott in the 2006 World Snooker Championship final.

Ronnie O'Sullivan compiled a maximum break in the deciding frame of his semi-final match against Mark Selby, his eighth maximum, equalling the official record of tournament 147 breaks first set by Stephen Hendry. This was the second consecutive ranking tournament where he made a 147.

Ronnie O'Sullivan won his fourth UK Championship title by defeating Stephen Maguire 10–2 in the final. This came one year after O'Sullivan forfeited his quarter-final against Hendry while trailing 4–1. This was the biggest winning margin in a UK final since O'Sullivan himself thrashed Ken Doherty 10–1 six years earlier.

== Prize fund ==
The breakdown of prize money for this year is shown below:

- Winner: £100,000
- Runner-up: £46,000
- Semi-final: £23,250
- Quarter-finalist: £15,800
- Last 16: £11,750
- Last 32: £8,000
- Last 48: £4,500
- Last 64: £2,200
- Stage one highest break: £500
- Stage two highest break: £5000
- Stage one maximum break: £1,000
- Stage two maximum break: £25,000
- Total: £590,400

== Main draw ==
Last 32; Best of 17 frames
1	Peter Ebdon (ENG)	8
Ian McCulloch (ENG)	9
10	Stephen Maguire (SCO)	9
Joe Swail (NIR)	3
12	Mark Williams (WAL)	9
Ricky Walden (ENG)	3
8	Stephen Hendry (SCO)	4
Mark Allen (NIR)	9
5	Ken Doherty (IRL)	7
Nigel Bond (ENG)	9
9	Ding Junhui (CHN)	9
Adrian Gunnell (ENG)	3
15	Steve Davis (ENG)	4
Stuart Bingham (ENG)	9
4	Shaun Murphy (ENG)	9
Paul Davies (WAL)	5
3	Graeme Dott (SCO)	7
Dave Harold (ENG)	9
11	Mark Selby (ENG)	9
Anthony Hamilton (ENG)	5
16	Ryan Day (WAL)	6
Marco Fu (HKG)	9
7	Neil Robertson (AUS)	6
Joe Perry (ENG)	9
6	Ronnie O'Sullivan (ENG)	9
Michael Holt (ENG)	6
13	Stephen Lee (ENG)	8
Mark King (ENG)	9
14	Ali Carter (ENG)	8
Barry Hawkins (ENG)	9
2	John Higgins (SCO)	3
Jamie Cope (ENG)	9

Last 16; Best of 17 frames
(England) Ian McCulloch	5
10	(Scotland) Stephen Maguire	9
12	(Wales) Mark Williams	9
(Northern Ireland) Mark Allen	5
(England) Nigel Bond	5
9	(China) Ding Junhui	9
(England) Stuart Bingham	3
4	(England) Shaun Murphy	9
(England) Dave Harold	2
11	(England) Mark Selby	9
(Hong Kong) Marco Fu	9
(England) Joe Perry	2
6	(England) Ronnie O'Sullivan	9
(England) Mark King	1
(England) Barry Hawkins	8
(England) Jamie Cope	9

Quarter-finals; Best of 17 frames
10	(Scotland) Stephen Maguire	9
12	(Wales) Mark Williams	5
9	(China) Ding Junhui	7
4	(England) Shaun Murphy	9
11	(England) Mark Selby	9
(Hong Kong) Marco Fu	7
6	(England) Ronnie O'Sullivan	9
(England) Jamie Cope	2

Semi-finals; Best of 17 frames
10	(Scotland) Stephen Maguire	9
4	(England) Shaun Murphy	5
11	(England) Mark Selby	8
6	(England) Ronnie O'Sullivan	9

Final; Best of 19 frames
10	(Scotland) Stephen Maguire	2
6	(England) Ronnie O'Sullivan	10

== Final ==
Final: Best of 19 frames. Referee: Eirian Williams. Telford International Centre, Telford, England, 16 December 2007.
Stephen Maguire (10); Scotland	2–10	Ronnie O'Sullivan (6); England
Afternoon: 4–120 (54, 66), 1–68, 42–78 (78), 29–75 (66), 26–100 (53), 1–78 (78), 24–80 (52), 1–70; Evening: 103–0 (99), 0–126 (126), 75–0 (57), 16–115 (94)
99	Highest break	126
0	Century breaks	1
2	50+ breaks	9

== Qualifying ==
Qualifying for the tournament took place between 23 and 30 November 2007 at Pontin's in Prestatyn, Wales.

Round 1 Best of 17 frames
Mark Joyce (ENG)	9
Kevin Van Hove (BEL)	2
Shailesh Jogia (ENG)	9
Liu Chuang (CHN)	4
Leo Fernandez (IRL)	4
Martin Gould (ENG)	9
Lee Spick (ENG)	9
Jimmy Robertson (ENG)	6
Lee Walker (WAL)	6
Patrick Wallace (NIR)	9
Liang Wenbo (CHN)	9
Ashley Wright (ENG)	8
Liu Song (CHN)	9
Ben Woollaston (ENG)	7
Kurt Maflin (NOR)	9
Xiao Guodong (CHN)	8
David Morris (IRL)	9
Gareth Coppack (WAL)	8
Tony Drago (MLT)	3
Alfie Burden (ENG)	9
Tian Pengfei (CHN)	8
Supoj Saenla (THA)	9
James McBain (SCO)	9
Steve Mifsud (AUS)	6
Munraj Pal (ENG)	9
Issara Kachaiwong (THA)	6
Alex Davies (ENG)	7
Rodney Goggins (IRL)	9
Matthew Selt (ENG)	9
Fraser Patrick (SCO)	3
Jamie O'Neill (ENG)	9
Michael White (WAL)	5

Round 2 Best of 17 frames
Rod Lawler (ENG)	5
(England) Mark Joyce	9
Robin Hull (FIN)	w/d
(England) Shailesh Jogia	w/o
Mike Dunn (ENG)	7
(England) Martin Gould	9
Jimmy White (ENG)	7
(England) Lee Spick	9
Drew Henry (SCO)	5
(Northern Ireland) Patrick Wallace	9
David Roe (ENG)	9
(China) Liang Wenbo	2
Scott MacKenzie (SCO)	6
(China) Liu Song	9
Paul Davies (WAL)	9
(Norway) Kurt Maflin	6
Stuart Pettman (ENG)	6
(Republic of Ireland) David Morris	9
Barry Pinches (ENG)	9
(England) Alfie Burden	2
Marcus Campbell (SCO)	9
(Thailand) Supoj Saenla	4
Jimmy Michie (ENG)	9
(Scotland) James McBain	7
Joe Delaney (IRL)	6
(England) Munraj Pal	9
Judd Trump (ENG)	8
(Republic of Ireland) Rodney Goggins	9
Ian Preece (WAL)	9
(England) Matthew Selt	8
Tom Ford (ENG)	9
(England) Jamie O'Neill	7

Round 3 Best of 17 frames
Rory McLeod (ENG)	6
(England) Mark Joyce	9
Robert Milkins (ENG)	9
(England) Shailesh Jogia	5
Ricky Walden (ENG)	9
(England) Martin Gould	7
Andrew Higginson (ENG)	9
(England) Lee Spick	8
David Gilbert (ENG)	9
(Northern Ireland) Patrick Wallace	2
Adrian Gunnell (ENG)	9
(England) David Roe	4
Fergal O'Brien (IRL)	9
(China) Liu Song	8
Mark Davis (ENG)	8
(Wales) Paul Davies	9
Andrew Norman (ENG)	7
(Republic of Ireland) David Morris	9
Alan McManus (SCO)	5
(England) Barry Pinches	9
Michael Judge (IRL)	3
(Scotland) Marcus Campbell	9
Andy Hicks (ENG)	8
(England) Jimmy Michie	9
Jamie Burnett (SCO)	9
(England) Munraj Pal	7
David Gray (ENG)	9
(Republic of Ireland) Rodney Goggins	3
John Parrott (ENG)	6
(Wales) Ian Preece	9
James Wattana (THA)	2
(England) Tom Ford	9

Round 4 Best of 17 frames
Ian McCulloch (ENG)	9
(England) Mark Joyce	2
Joe Swail (NIR)	9
(England) Robert Milkins	7
Gerard Greene (NIR)	8
(England) Ricky Walden	9
Mark Allen (NIR)	9
(England) Andrew Higginson	7
Nigel Bond (ENG)	9
(England) David Gilbert	7
Matthew Stevens (WAL)	7
(England) Adrian Gunnell	9
Stuart Bingham (ENG)	9
(Republic of Ireland) Fergal O'Brien	5
Dominic Dale (WAL)	3
(Wales) Paul Davies	9
Dave Harold (ENG)	9
(Republic of Ireland) David Morris	3
Anthony Hamilton (ENG)	9
(England) Barry Pinches	6
Marco Fu (HKG)	9
(Scotland) Marcus Campbell	4
Joe Perry (ENG)	9
(England) Jimmy Michie	6
Michael Holt (ENG)	9
(Scotland) Jamie Burnett	5
Mark King (ENG)	9
(England) David Gray	7
Barry Hawkins (ENG)	9
(Wales) Ian Preece	3
Jamie Cope (ENG)	9
(England) Tom Ford	8

== Century breaks ==
=== Televised stage centuries ===
- 147, 137, 126, 119, 117, 112 – Ronnie O'Sullivan
- 144, 135, – Shaun Murphy
- 143, 112, 100 – Ding Junhui
- 139, 132, 111, 102 – Marco Fu
- 139 – Ali Carter
- 137, 133, 105 – Jamie Cope
- 137 – Ryan Day
- 131 – Nigel Bond
- 130, 122, 120, 108, 106, 105, 101 – Stephen Maguire
- 130, 120, 101, 100 – Mark Selby
- 123, 120 – Ian McCulloch
- 120 – Graeme Dott
- 116 – Michael Holt
- 115, 103 – Mark Allen
- 111 – Neil Robertson
- 106 – Barry Hawkins
- 104 – Stephen Hendry
- 100 – John Higgins

=== Qualifying stage centuries ===
- 146 – Mark Allen
- 141 – Dominic Dale
- 139, 134 – Tian Pengfei
- 138 – Ben Woollaston
- 138 – Rory McLeod
- 137, 133, 121 – David Gray
- 135 – Michael White
- 134, 100, 100 – Tom Ford
- 133, 110, 104, 103, 100 – Barry Pinches
- 133 – Matthew Stevens
- 132, 120 – Joe Delaney
- 129, 127 – Fergal O'Brien
- 129 – Kurt Maflin
- 128, 116, 115 – Ricky Walden
- 123 – James McBain
- 122 – Dave Harold
- 119 – Jamie O'Neill
- 116 – Robert Milkins
- 115 – Stuart Bingham
- 115 – Mark Joyce
- 114 – Alex Davies
- 114 – Alan McManus
- 112, 103 – Shailesh Jogia
- 112 – John Parrott
- 112 – Mark Davis
- 111 – Andy Hicks
- 110 – Andrew Higginson
- 109, 107 – Mark King
- 109, 106 – Liu Song
- 109 – Liang Wenbo
- 107, 107, 100 – Jamie Burnett
- 106 – Jimmy White
- 105 – Jimmy Michie
- 102 – Adrian Gunnell
- 102 – Lee Spick
- 101 – Paul Davies
- 100 – David Roe
- 100 – Jamie Cope
