= 2007 Northern Ireland Trophy =

Northern Ireland Trophy
Tournament information
- Dates: 4–11 November 2007
- Venue: Waterfront Hall
- City: Belfast
- Country: Northern Ireland
- Organisation: WPBSA
- Format: Ranking event
- Total prize fund: £200,000
- Winner's share: £30,000
- Highest break: Ronnie O'Sullivan (ENG) (147)

Final
- Champion: Stephen Maguire (SCO)
- Runner-up: Fergal O'Brien (IRL)
- Score: 9–5

The 2007 Northern Ireland Trophy was a professional ranking snooker tournament that took place between 4–11 November 2007 at the Waterfront Hall in Belfast, Northern Ireland.

Stephen Maguire won his first ranking tournament since 2004 by defeating Fergal O'Brien 9–5 in the final. This was Maguire's third ranking title.

In his third round match Ronnie O'Sullivan completed a maximum break against Ali Carter, one of five centuries that he compiled in his 5–2 victory. O'Sullivan remains the only player to make five centuries in a best of 9 match.

== Prize fund ==
The breakdown of prize money for this year is shown below:

- Winner: £30,000
- Runner-up: £15,000
- Semi-final: £7,500
- Quarter-final: £5,600
- Last 16: £4,000
- Last 32: £2,500
- Last 48: £1,625
- Last 64: £1,100
- Stage one highest break: £500
- Stage two highest break: £2,000
- Stage one maximum break: £1,000
- Stage two maximum break: £20,000
- Total: £200,000

== Main draw ==
Last 48; Best of 9 frames
18	(England) Joe Perry	5
(Thailand) James Wattana	1
23	(England) Stuart Bingham	2
(England) David Gray	5
28	(England) Ian McCulloch	5
(Scotland) Alan McManus	1
22	(England) Jamie Cope	5
(Wales) Lee Walker	2
27	(Hong Kong) Marco Fu	3
(England) Adrian Gunnell	5
17	(Northern Ireland) Joe Swail	5
(China) Liu Song	2
20	(Wales) Matthew Stevens	4
(England) Martin Gould	5
26	(England) Anthony Hamilton	5
(Republic of Ireland) Michael Judge	2
29	(Northern Ireland) Mark Allen	5
(England) Rod Lawler	1
31	(Wales) Dominic Dale	5
(England) Mike Dunn	1
32	(Northern Ireland) Gerard Greene	5
(China) Liang Wenbo	2
21	(England) Mark King	5
(England) John Parrott	4
24	(England) Michael Holt	1
(England) Tom Ford	5
25	(England) Nigel Bond	5
(England) David Gilbert	3
19	(England) Barry Hawkins	5
(Scotland) Jamie Burnett	4
30	(England) Dave Harold	1
(Republic of Ireland) Fergal O'Brien	5

Last 32; Best of 9 frames
1	(China) Ding Junhui	5
18	(England) Joe Perry	2
10	(Scotland) Stephen Maguire	5
(England) David Gray	0
13	(England) Stephen Lee	4
28	(England) Ian McCulloch	5
8	(Australia) Neil Robertson	5
22	(England) Jamie Cope	1
7	(England) Peter Ebdon	5
(England) Adrian Gunnell	2
15	(England) Steve Davis	5
17	(Northern Ireland) Joe Swail	3
9	(Scotland) Stephen Hendry	5
(England) Martin Gould	3
4	(England) Shaun Murphy	5
26	(England) Anthony Hamilton	2
3	(Scotland) Graeme Dott	3
29	(Northern Ireland) Mark Allen	5
16	(Wales) Ryan Day	5
31	(Wales) Dominic Dale	1
12	(Wales) Mark Williams	3
32	(Northern Ireland) Gerard Greene	5
5	(Republic of Ireland) Ken Doherty	5
21	(England) Mark King	0
6	(England) Ronnie O'Sullivan	5
(England) Tom Ford	4
14	(England) Ali Carter	5
25	(England) Nigel Bond	3
11	(England) Mark Selby	4
19	(England) Barry Hawkins	5
2	(Scotland) John Higgins	4
(Republic of Ireland) Fergal O'Brien	5

Last 16; Best of 9 frames
1	(China) Ding Junhui	3
10	(Scotland) Stephen Maguire	5
28	(England) Ian McCulloch	0
8	(Australia) Neil Robertson	5
7	(England) Peter Ebdon	5
15	(England) Steve Davis	0
9	(Scotland) Stephen Hendry	2
4	(England) Shaun Murphy	5
29	(Northern Ireland) Mark Allen	5
16	(Wales) Ryan Day	3
32	(Northern Ireland) Gerard Greene	5
5	(Republic of Ireland) Ken Doherty	1
6	(England) Ronnie O'Sullivan	5
14	(England) Ali Carter	2
19	(England) Barry Hawkins	3
(Republic of Ireland) Fergal O'Brien	5

Quarter-finals; Best of 9 frames
10	(Scotland) Stephen Maguire	5
8	(Australia) Neil Robertson	2
7	(England) Peter Ebdon	3
4	(England) Shaun Murphy	5
29	(Northern Ireland) Mark Allen	5
32	(Northern Ireland) Gerard Greene	3
6	(England) Ronnie O'Sullivan	2
(Republic of Ireland) Fergal O'Brien	5

Semi-finals; Best of 11 frames
10	(Scotland) Stephen Maguire	6
4	(England) Shaun Murphy	5
29	(Northern Ireland) Mark Allen	3
(Republic of Ireland) Fergal O'Brien	6

Final; Best of 17 frames
10	(Scotland) Stephen Maguire	9
(Republic of Ireland) Fergal O'Brien	5

== Final ==
Final: Best of 17 frames Waterfront Hall, Belfast, Northern Ireland, 11 November 2007.
Stephen Maguire; Scotland	9–5	Fergal O'Brien; Ireland
Afternoon: 109–8 (60), 0–84 (84), 0–97, 69–46, 135–0 (135), 72–62 (O'Brien 58), 56–65 (Maguire 56), 79–0 (73); Evening: 45–74, 63–16, 84–0, 30–73, 71–39, 97–0 (56)
135	Highest break	84
1	Century breaks	0
5	50+ breaks	2

== Qualifying ==
Qualifying for the tournament took place at Pontin's in Prestatyn, Wales between 23 October and 25 October 2007.

Round 1 Best of 9 frames
(England) Lee Spick	5
(China) Liu Chuang	4
(England) Shailesh Jogia	2
(Wales) Michael White	5
(England) Alex Davies	1
(England) Jimmy Robertson	5
(Wales) Lee Walker	5
(England) Ashley Wright	2
(England) Jamie O'Neill	5
(Thailand) Supoj Saenla	3
(China) Liu Song	5
(Wales) Gareth Coppack	0
(England) Matthew Selt	2
(England) Martin Gould	5
(Scotland) James McBain	2
(Northern Ireland) Patrick Wallace	5
(Norway) Kurt Maflin	5
(Australia) Steve Mifsud	2
(England) Mark Joyce	5
(Belgium) Kevin Van Hove	0
(China) Liang Wenbo	5
(Scotland) Fraser Patrick	3
(Malta) Tony Drago	4
(Thailand) Issara Kachaiwong	5
(England) Munraj Pal	2
(England) Ben Woollaston	5
(Republic of Ireland) Leo Fernandez	1
(China) Xiao Guodong	5
(Republic of Ireland) David Morris	5
(England) Alfred Burden	3
(China) Tian Pengfei	4
(Republic of Ireland) Rodney Goggins	5

Round 2 Best of 9 frames
(Wales) Paul Davies	3
(England) Lee Spick	5
(Finland) Robin Hull	5
(Wales) Michael White	1
(England) Judd Trump	5
(England) Jimmy Robertson	1
(Scotland) Scott MacKenzie	2
(Wales) Lee Walker	5
(England) Marcus Campbell	0
(England) Jamie O'Neill	5
(England) Jimmy Michie	4
(China) Liu Song	5
(England) David Roe	1
(England) Martin Gould	5
(England) Stuart Pettman	2
(Northern Ireland) Patrick Wallace	5
(England) Rod Lawler	5
(Norway) Kurt Maflin	3
(England) Mike Dunn	5
(England) Mark Joyce	4
(Republic of Ireland) Joe Delaney	1
(China) Liang Wenbo	5
(Scotland) Drew Henry	5
(Thailand) Issara Kachaiwong	4
(England) Tom Ford	5
(England) Ben Woollaston	2
(England) Jimmy White	0
(China) Xiao Guodong	5
(England) Ian Preece	4
(Republic of Ireland) David Morris	5
(England) Barry Pinches	5
(Republic of Ireland) Rodney Goggins	1

Round 3 Best of 9 frames
(Thailand) James Wattana	5
(England) Lee Spick	2
(England) David Gray	5
(Finland) Robin Hull	2
(Scotland) Alan McManus	5
(England) Judd Trump	0
(England) Robert Milkins	4
(Wales) Lee Walker	5
(England) Adrian Gunnell	5
(England) Jamie O'Neill	0
(England) Ricky Walden	2
(China) Liu Song	5
(England) Mark Davis	4
(England) Martin Gould	5
(Republic of Ireland) Michael Judge	5
(Northern Ireland) Patrick Wallace	3
(England) Andrew Higginson	4
(England) Rod Lawler	5
(England) Andy Hicks	2
(England) Mike Dunn	5
(England) Rory McLeod	4
(China) Liang Wenbo	5
(England) John Parrott	5
(Scotland) Drew Henry	2
(England) Andrew Norman	1
(England) Tom Ford	5
(England) David Gilbert	5
(China) Xiao Guodong	2
(Scotland) Jamie Burnett	5
(Republic of Ireland) David Morris	1
(Republic of Ireland) Fergal O'Brien	5
(England) Barry Pinches	4

== Century breaks ==
=== Qualifying stage centuries ===
- 136 – Alfie Burden
- 135 – Barry Pinches
- 134 – Rory McLeod
- 130 – Robin Hull
- 129 – Jimmy Michie
- 118 – Mike Dunn
- 113 – Patrick Wallace
- 113 – John Parrott
- 110, 100 – Kurt Maflin
- 110 – Robert Milkins
- 109, 100 – Liang Wenbo
- 107 – Ben Woollaston
- 104 – Jamie O'Neill
- 103 – Liu Song
- 100 – Xiao Guodong

=== Televised stage centuries ===
- 147, 129, 122, 110, 108, 107 – Ronnie O'Sullivan
- 142, 114 – Fergal O'Brien
- 136 – Ian McCulloch
- 136 – Ali Carter
- 135, 106, 105 – Stephen Maguire
- 130, 127 – Ding Junhui
- 127 – Stephen Hendry
- 124, 113 – Shaun Murphy
- 114 – Marco Fu
- 113, 108, 100 – Mark Allen
- 112 – Ken Doherty
- 112 – Barry Hawkins
- 110 – Neil Robertson
- 108, 102 – Stephen Lee
- 108 – Joe Perry
- 106 – Nigel Bond
- 102 – Adrian Gunnell
- 101 – Ryan Day
