= European Tour 2013/2014 – Event 1 =

European Tour 2013/2014 Event 1

Tournament information
- Dates: 6–9 June 2013
- Venue: Universiada Hall
- City: Sofia
- Country: Bulgaria
- Organisation: World Snooker
- Format: Minor-ranking event
- Total prize fund: €125,000
- Winner's share: €25,000
- Highest break: Neil Robertson (AUS) (142); Anthony McGill (SCO) (142)

Final
- Champion: John Higgins (SCO)
- Runner-up: Neil Robertson (AUS)
- Score: 4–1

The European Tour 2013/2014 – Event 1 (also known as the 2013 Victoria Bulgarian Open) was a professional minor-ranking snooker tournament that took place between 6–9 June 2013 at the Universiada Hall in Sofia, Bulgaria.

Judd Trump was the defending champion, but he lost 2–4 against David Gilbert in the last 64.

John Higgins won his 41st professional title by defeating Neil Robertson 4–1 in the final. Ronnie O'Sullivan played in his first tournament outside of England since 2012 China Open, and he reached the semi-finals, where he lost to Higgins.

== Prize fund and ranking points ==
The breakdown of prize money and ranking points of the event is shown below:

	Prize fund	Ranking points^{1}
Winner	€25,000	2,000
Runner-up	€12,000	1,600
Semi-finalist	€6,000	1,280
Quarter-finalist	€4,000	1,000
Last 16	€2,300	760
Last 32	€1,200	560
Last 64	€700	360
Total	€125,000	–

- ^{1} Only professional players can earn ranking points.

== Main draw ==
=== Preliminary round ===
Best of 7 frames

(Bulgaria) Luchezar Gergov	0–4	(England) Oliver Brown
(Bulgaria) Lachezar Rusakov	0–4	(England) Ryan Causton
(England) Gary Steele	1–4	(Bulgaria) Nikolai Vlashev

(Bulgaria) Damail Tugov	2–4	(Bulgaria) Ivelin Boyanov
(England) Matthew Day	4–1	(Bulgaria) Ivan Kupov
(Romania) Tiberiu Teodoru	0–4	(England) Joe Steele

=== Main rounds ===
==== Top half ====
===== Section 1 =====
Last 128; Best of 7 frames
(Australia) Neil Robertson	4
(Bulgaria) Ivaylo Pekov	0
(Norway) Kurt Maflin	4
(Bulgaria) Krasimir Kameshev	0
(England) Simon Bedford	4
(England) James Cahill	3
(England) Mike Dunn	4
(Bulgaria) Julian Petrov	0
(England) Anthony Hamilton	4
(England) Oliver Brown	0
(Scotland) Graeme Dott	4
(Bulgaria) Konstantin Gochev	0
(England) Jamie O'Neill	4
(Romania) Cosmin Constantin	0

Last 64; Best of 7 frames
(Australia) Neil Robertson	4
(Norway) Kurt Maflin	2
(England) Simon Bedford	2
(England) Mike Dunn	4
(England) Adam Duffy	2
(England) Anthony Hamilton	4
(Scotland) Graeme Dott	4
(England) Jamie O'Neill	3

Last 32; Best of 7 frames
(Australia) Neil Robertson	4
(England) Mike Dunn	1
(England) Anthony Hamilton	4
(Scotland) Graeme Dott	2

Last 16; Best of 7 frames
(Australia) Neil Robertson	4
(England) Anthony Hamilton	1

===== Section 2 =====
Last 128; Best of 7 frames
(England) Jimmy Robertson	4
(Bulgaria) Stanislav Hadvipopov	0
(England) Jack Lisowski	4
(England) Matthew Couch	3
(England) Michael Wasley	4
(England) Ryan Causton	0
(England) Martin Gould	w/o
(England) Lee Spick	w/d
(Scotland) Anthony McGill	4
(Qatar) Ahmed Saif	0
(Wales) Ryan Day	4
(England) Sidney Wilson	0
(England) Rory McLeod	1
(England) John Astley	4

Last 64; Best of 7 frames
(England) Michael Holt	0
(England) Jimmy Robertson	4
(England) Jack Lisowski	4
(England) Michael Wasley	1
(England) Martin Gould	2
(Scotland) Anthony McGill	4
(Wales) Ryan Day	4
(England) John Astley	0

Last 32; Best of 7 frames
(England) Jimmy Robertson	4
(England) Jack Lisowski	2
(Scotland) Anthony McGill	4
(Wales) Ryan Day	0

Last 16; Best of 7 frames
(England) Jimmy Robertson	4
(Scotland) Anthony McGill	2

===== Section 3 =====
Last 128; Best of 7 frames
(Scotland) Scott Donaldson	4
(Scotland) Ross Muir	1
(Wales) Michael White	4
(England) Craig Barber	1
(Wales) Jamie Jones	4
(Bulgaria) Nikola Kemilev	0
(England) Alfie Burden	4
(Bulgaria) Nikolai Vlashev	2
(Wales) Matthew Stevens	4
(Bulgaria) Hristo Sirakov	0
(England) Jamie Cope	4
(Romania) Paul Croitoru	1
(England) Joe Perry	4
(Northern Ireland) Joe Swail	3
(England) Sean O'Sullivan	4
(England) Ryan Clark	1

Last 64; Best of 7 frames
(Scotland) Scott Donaldson	4
(Wales) Michael White	2
(Wales) Jamie Jones	4
(England) Alfie Burden	3
(Wales) Matthew Stevens	4
(England) Jamie Cope	2
(England) Joe Perry	2
(England) Sean O'Sullivan	4

Last 32; Best of 7 frames
(Scotland) Scott Donaldson	4
(Wales) Jamie Jones	3
(Wales) Matthew Stevens	4
(England) Sean O'Sullivan	0

Last 16; Best of 7 frames
(Scotland) Scott Donaldson	4
(Wales) Matthew Stevens	1

===== Section 4 =====
Last 128; Best of 7 frames
(England) Mark Joyce	3
(Germany) Patrick Einsle	4
(England) Tom Ford	4
(England) Sam Harvey	1
(England) Nigel Bond	4
(England) Alex Davies	2
(England) David Grace	4
(Romania) Rareș Șinca	0
(England) Mark King	4
(England) Christopher Keogan	0
(England) Peter Ebdon	3
(England) Gary Wilson	4
(England) Barry Hawkins	4
(Switzerland) Alexander Ursenbacher	0
(England) Craig Steadman	3
(England) Kyren Wilson	4

Last 64; Best of 7 frames
(Germany) Patrick Einsle	1
(England) Tom Ford	4
(England) Nigel Bond	4
(England) David Grace	1
(England) Mark King	3
(England) Gary Wilson	4
(England) Barry Hawkins	4
(England) Kyren Wilson	1

Last 32; Best of 7 frames
(England) Tom Ford	2
(England) Nigel Bond	4
(England) Gary Wilson	3
(England) Barry Hawkins	4

Last 16; Best of 7 frames
(England) Nigel Bond	1
(England) Barry Hawkins	4

==== Bottom half ====
===== Section 5 =====
Last 128; Best of 7 frames
(England) Shaun Murphy	4
(Bulgaria) Georgi Velichkov	0
(England) Paul Davison	2
(England) Hammad Miah	4
(Scotland) Alan McManus	w/o
(Wales) Jak Jones	w/d
(England) Liam Highfield	4
(Bulgaria) Nikolai Hristov	0
(Belgium) Luca Brecel	4
(Belgium) Hans Blanckaert	0
(England) Rod Lawler	4
(England) Mark Vincent	0
(England) Andrew Higginson	4
(Romania) Toma Cristian Marinescu	0
(Scotland) John Higgins	4
(Bulgaria) Bratislav Krustev	0

Last 64; Best of 7 frames
(England) Shaun Murphy	4
(England) Hammad Miah	0
(Scotland) Alan McManus	4
(England) Liam Highfield	1
(Belgium) Luca Brecel	4
(England) Rod Lawler	3
(England) Andrew Higginson	2
(Scotland) John Higgins	4

Last 32; Best of 7 frames
(England) Shaun Murphy	4
(Scotland) Alan McManus	1
(Belgium) Luca Brecel	0
(Scotland) John Higgins	4

Last 16; Best of 7 frames
(England) Shaun Murphy	0
(Scotland) John Higgins	4

===== Section 6 =====
Last 128; Best of 7 frames
(England) Jimmy White	0
(Wales) Andrew Pagett	4
(England) Peter Lines	1
(England) Stuart Carrington	4
(Malta) Tony Drago	4
(England) Darren Cook	2
(England) Joel Walker	4
(Bulgaria) Julian Serbeski	0
(England) Steve Davis	4
(Bulgaria) Ivelin Boyanov	0
(Republic of Ireland) Fergal O'Brien	4
(England) Allan Taylor	1
(England) Ben Woollaston	w/o
(England) Chris Wakelin	w/d
(Northern Ireland) Gerard Greene	w/o
(England) David Gray	w/d

Last 64; Best of 7 frames
(Wales) Andrew Pagett	2
(England) Stuart Carrington	4
(Malta) Tony Drago	3
(England) Joel Walker	4
(England) Steve Davis	1
(Republic of Ireland) Fergal O'Brien	4
(England) Ben Woollaston	4
(Northern Ireland) Gerard Greene	2

Last 32; Best of 7 frames
(England) Stuart Carrington	4
(England) Joel Walker	1
(Republic of Ireland) Fergal O'Brien	4
(England) Ben Woollaston	1

Last 16; Best of 7 frames
(England) Stuart Carrington	1
(Republic of Ireland) Fergal O'Brien	4

===== Section 7 =====
Last 128; Best of 7 frames
(Wales) Mark Williams	4
(Australia) Vinnie Calabrese	1
(Wales) Dominic Dale	4
(England) Lee Page	2
(Wales) Daniel Wells	4
(England) Matthew Day	1
(Republic of Ireland) Ken Doherty	4
(England) Oliver Lines	3
(Scotland) Marcus Campbell	4
(England) Elliot Slessor	3
(England) Robert Milkins	4
(England) Kashif Khan	0
(England) Barry Pinches	4
(England) Chris Norbury	1
(England) Sam Baird	4
(England) Joe Steele	2

Last 64; Best of 7 frames
(Wales) Mark Williams	4
(Wales) Dominic Dale	0
(Wales) Daniel Wells	3
(Republic of Ireland) Ken Doherty	4
(Scotland) Marcus Campbell	1
(England) Robert Milkins	4
(England) Barry Pinches	1
(England) Sam Baird	4

Last 32; Best of 7 frames
(Wales) Mark Williams	4
(Republic of Ireland) Ken Doherty	3
(England) Robert Milkins	1
(England) Sam Baird	4

Last 16; Best of 7 frames
(Wales) Mark Williams	4
(England) Sam Baird	1

===== Section 8 =====
Last 128; Best of 7 frames
(England) Ian Burns	4
(Scotland) Fraser Patrick	3
(England) Robbie Williams	4
(Portugal) Filipe Cardoso	0
(England) Martin O'Donnell	3
(Scotland) Michael Leslie	4
(England) Ronnie O'Sullivan	4
(England) Michael Wild	0
(England) Mark Davis	4
(Bulgaria) Dimitar Mehandjiiski	0
(England) Matthew Selt	4
(Bulgaria) Salim Otti	0
(England) David Gilbert	4
(England) Michael Georgiou	1
(England) Judd Trump	4
(England) Sanderson Lam	0

Last 64; Best of 7 frames
(England) Ian Burns	4
(England) Robbie Williams	1
(Scotland) Michael Leslie	1
(England) Ronnie O'Sullivan	4
(England) Mark Davis	4
(England) Matthew Selt	2
(England) David Gilbert	4
(England) Judd Trump	2

Last 32; Best of 7 frames
(England) Ian Burns	1
(England) Ronnie O'Sullivan	4
(England) Mark Davis	4
(England) David Gilbert	3

Last 16; Best of 7 frames
(England) Ronnie O'Sullivan	4
(England) Mark Davis	2

==== Finals ====
Quarter-finals; Best of 7 frames		Semi-finals; Best of 7 frames		Final; Best of 7 frames
(Australia) Neil Robertson	4
(England) Jimmy Robertson	2	(Australia) Neil Robertson	4
(Scotland) Scott Donaldson	1	(England) Barry Hawkins	3
(England) Barry Hawkins	4			(Australia) Neil Robertson	1
(Scotland) John Higgins	4			(Scotland) John Higgins	4
(Republic of Ireland) Fergal O'Brien	2	(Scotland) John Higgins	4
(Wales) Mark Williams	0	(England) Ronnie O'Sullivan	2
(England) Ronnie O'Sullivan	4

== Century breaks ==
- 142, 131, 115, 111, 106, 105, 105 – Neil Robertson
- 142, 126, 101, 100 – Anthony McGill
- 136 – David Gilbert
- 134 – Matthew Stevens
- 133, 102 – Mark Williams
- 130, 107 – Robert Milkins
- 129 – Stuart Carrington
- 126, 111, 105, 100 – Ronnie O'Sullivan
- 124 – David Grace
- 123, 123, 115 – Barry Hawkins
- 121 – Judd Trump
- 120 – Mark King
- 119 – Jamie Jones
- 118, 112, 102, 100 – John Higgins
- 112, 110 – Anthony Hamilton
- 112 – Scott Donaldson
- 112 – Jack Lisowski
- 112 – Dominic Dale
- 108 – Kurt Maflin
- 105, 100 – Jimmy Robertson
- 105 – Alfie Burden
- 105 – Paul Davison
- 104 – Graeme Dott
- 104 – Daniel Wells
- 102 – Fraser Patrick
- 102 – Joel Walker
- 101 – Shaun Murphy
