= 2007–08 snooker season =

Details
- Duration: 16 June 2007 – 15 May 2008
- Tournaments: 32 (7 ranking events)

Triple Crown winners
- UK Championship: (England) Ronnie O'Sullivan
- Masters: (England) Mark Selby
- World Championship: (England) Ronnie O'Sullivan

The 2007–08 snooker season was a series of snooker tournaments played between 16 June 2007 and 15 May 2008. This season saw the introduction of a new ranking tournament in Shanghai, while the Malta Cup lost its status as a ranking tournament.

== New professional players ==
Countries

- Belgium
- China
- England
- Ireland
- Australia
- Northern Ireland
- Norway
- Scotland
- Thailand
- Wales

Note: new means in these case, that these players were not on the 2006/2007 professional Main Tour.

International champions

1. IBSF World Snooker Championship winner: (Norway) Kurt Maflin
2. EBSA International Play Off winner: (Belgium) Kevin Van Hove
3. EBSA European Under-19 Snooker Championships winner: (Wales) Michael White
4. ACBS Asian Snooker Championship winner: (Thailand) Supoj Saenla
5. ACBS Asian Under-21 Snooker Championship winner: (China) Xiao Guodong

NGB nominations

6. English nomination 1: (Note: Jimmy Robertson qualified by topping the Pro Ticket Tour rankings.) (England) Jimmy Robertson
7. English nomination 2: (Note: Martin Gould qualified by winning the Pro Ticket Tour Play Offs.) (England) Martin Gould
8. Welsh nomination: (Note: Gareth Coppack qualified by topping the Welsh rankings.) (Wales) Gareth Coppack
9. Scottish nomination: (Note: Fraser Patrick qualified by topping the Scottish rankings.) (Scotland) Fraser Patrick
10. Irish nomination: (Note: Rodney Goggins qualified by topping the Irish rankings.) (Republic of Ireland) Rodney Goggins
11. Northern Irish nomination: (Note: Patrick Wallace qualified by topping the Northern Irish rankings.) (Northern Ireland) Patrick Wallace
12. ACBS Asian nomination: (China) Liu Chuang
13. Oceania nomination: (Australia) Steve Mifsud

From PIOS Tour

14. (Republic of Ireland) Leo Fernandez
15. (Wales) Lee Walker
16. (Scotland) James McBain
17. (England) Munraj Pal
18. (England) Jamie O'Neill
19. (England) Matthew Selt
20. (England) Alex Davies
21. (England) Ashley Wright

== Calendar ==
The following table outlines the results and dates for all the ranking and major invitational events.

=== World Snooker Tour ===
Start	Finish	Country	Tournament name	Venue	City	Winner	Runner-up	Score	Ref.
6 Aug	12 Aug	CHN	Shanghai Masters	Shanghai Grand Stage	Shanghai	(Wales) Dominic Dale	(Wales) Ryan Day	10–6	
7 Sep	12 Sep	ENG	Masters Qualifying Event	English Institute of Sport	Sheffield	(England) Barry Hawkins	(Norway) Kurt Maflin	6–4	
6 Oct		ENG	Pot Black	Sheffield City Hall	Sheffield	(Republic of Ireland) Ken Doherty	(England) Shaun Murphy	1–0	
13 Oct	21 Oct	SCO	Grand Prix	A.E.C.C.	Aberdeen	(Hong Kong) Marco Fu	(England) Ronnie O'Sullivan	9–6	
4 Nov	11 Nov	NIR	Northern Ireland Trophy	Waterfront Hall	Belfast	(Scotland) Stephen Maguire	(Republic of Ireland) Fergal O'Brien	9–5	
6 Sep	2 Dec	SCO	Premier League	A.E.C.C.	Aberdeen	(England) Ronnie O'Sullivan	(Scotland) John Higgins	7–4	
8 Dec	16 Dec	ENG	UK Championship	Telford International Centre	Telford	(England) Ronnie O'Sullivan	(Scotland) Stephen Maguire	10–2	
13 Jan	20 Jan	ENG	Masters	Wembley Arena	London	(England) Mark Selby	(England) Stephen Lee	10–3	
4 Feb	10 Feb	MLT	Malta Cup	Hilton Conference Center	Portomaso	(England) Shaun Murphy	(Republic of Ireland) Ken Doherty	9–3	
11 Feb	17 Feb	WAL	Welsh Open	Newport Centre	Newport	(England) Mark Selby	(England) Ronnie O'Sullivan	9–8	
24 Mar	30 Mar	CHN	China Open	Beijing University Students' Gymnasium	Beijing	(Scotland) Stephen Maguire	(England) Shaun Murphy	10–9	
19 Apr	5 May	ENG	World Snooker Championship	Crucible Theatre	Sheffield	(England) Ronnie O'Sullivan	(England) Ali Carter	18–8	
25 Feb	15 May	ENG	Championship League	Crondon Park Golf Club	Stock	(England) Joe Perry	(England) Mark Selby	3–1	

Ranking event
Non-ranking event

=== World Ladies Billiards and Snooker Association ===
Start	Finish	Country	Tournament name	Venue	City	Winner	Runner-up	Score	Ref.
13 Sep	13 Sep	ENG	Wytech Masters	North East Derbyshire Snooker Centre	Chesterfield	(England) Reanne Evans	(England) Katie Henrick	3–2	
14 Sep	14 Sep	ENG	UK Ladies Championship	North East Derbyshire Snooker Centre	Chesterfield	(England) Reanne Evans	(England) Maria Catalano	3–1	
6 Oct	6 Oct	ENG	East Anglian Championship	Cambridge Snooker Centre	Cambridge	(England) Katie Henrick	(England) June Banks	3–1	
10 Nov	10 Nov	ENG	British Open	Rushden Snooker Club	Rushden	(England) Maria Catalano	(England) Emma Bonney	3–2	
2 Feb	2 Feb	ENG	South Coast Classic	Q Ball Snooker Club	Eastbourne	(England) Emma Bonney	(England) June Banks	3–2	
1 Mar	1 Mar	ENG	Connie Gough Memorial	Rileys Snooker Club	Luton	(England) Maria Catalano	(England) Reanne Evans	3–2	
3 May	7 May	ENG	World Ladies Championship	Cambridge Snooker Centre	Cambridge	(England) Reanne Evans	(England) June Banks	5–2	

=== Pontin's International Open Series ===
Start	Finish	Country	Tournament name	Venue	City	Winner	Runner-up	Score	Ref.
16 Jul	20 Jul	WAL	PIOS I	Pontin's	Prestatyn	(England) Simon Bedford	(England) Gary Wilkinson	6–3	
5 Aug	10 Aug	WAL	PIOS II	Pontin's	Prestatyn	(England) Kuldesh Johal	(Wales) Andrew Pagett	6–4	
23 Sep	28 Sep	WAL	PIOS III	Pontin's	Prestatyn	(England) Paul Davison	(England) Michael King	6–2	
14 Oct	19 Oct	WAL	PIOS IV	Pontin's	Prestatyn	(England) Matthew Couch	(England) Michael Wild	6–3	
11 Dec	15 Dec	WAL	PIOS V	Pontin's	Prestatyn	(England) Peter Lines	(Wales) Daniel Wells	6–5	
15 Feb	19 Feb	WAL	PIOS VI	Pontin's	Prestatyn	(England) Kuldesh Johal	(England) Simon Bedford	6–5	
24 Mar	28 Mar	WAL	PIOS VII	Pontin's	Prestatyn	(Wales) Jamie Jones	(England) Peter Lines	6–2	
13 Apr	18 Apr	WAL	PIOS VIII	Pontin's	Prestatyn	(England) Liam Highfield	(England) Justin Astley	6–2	

=== Other events ===
Start	Finish	Country	Tournament name	Venue	City	Winner	Runner-up	Score	Ref.
16 Jun	17 Jun	POL	Warsaw Snooker Tour	Torwar Hall	Warsaw	(England) Mark Selby	(Scotland) John Higgins	5–3	
12 Jul	15 Jul	HKG	Euro-Asia Masters Challenge	Queen Elizabeth Stadium	Wan Chai	(Scotland) John Higgins	(Thailand) James Wattana	5–4	
14 Aug	19 Aug	ENG	Paul Hunter English Open	Northern Snooker Centre	Leeds	(England) Matthew Couch	(Australia) Neil Robertson	6–5	
18 Aug	19 Aug	IRL	Irish Classic	Raphael's Snooker Club	Dublin	(Republic of Ireland) David Morris	(Republic of Ireland) Fergal O'Brien	5–3	
23 Aug	26 Aug	GER	Paul Hunter Classic	Stadthall	Fürth	(England) Barry Pinches	(Republic of Ireland) Ken Doherty	4–0	
25 Sep	30 Sep	IRL	Irish Professional Championship	Red Cow Exhibition Centre	Dublin	(Republic of Ireland) Ken Doherty	(Republic of Ireland) Fergal O'Brien	9–2	
27 Oct	2 Nov	MAC	Asian Indoor Games	Macau East Asian Games Dome	Macau	(United Arab Emirates) Mohammed Shehab	(Thailand) James Wattana	4–3	
15 Nov	18 Nov	SUI	Swiss Open	Billiard Center Im Funken	Zofingen	(England) Dave Harold	(Republic of Ireland) Ken Doherty	5–0	
1 Dec	2 Dec	WAL	Pontin's Pro Am Series	Pontin's	Prestatyn	(England) Joe Perry	(England) Ricky Walden	4–2	
15 Dec	16 Dec	NED	Dutch Open	De Dieze	's-Hertogenbosch	(England) Michael Holt	(England) Barry Pinches	6–4	
14 May	18 May	CHN	Huangshan Cup	Anhui Sport Bureau	Hefei	(England) Ali Carter	(Hong Kong) Marco Fu	5–3	

== Official rankings ==
The top 16 of the world rankings, these players automatically played in the final rounds of the world ranking events and were invited for the Masters.

No.	Ch.	Player	Points 2005/06	Points 2006/07	Total
1	▲	(Scotland) John Higgins	19150	23100	42250
2	▲	(Scotland) Graeme Dott	19100	18675	37775
3	▲	(England) Shaun Murphy	16350	21350	37700
4	▼	(Republic of Ireland) Ken Doherty	20250	15550	35800
5	▼	(England) Ronnie O'Sullivan	12850	20750	33600
6	▲	(England) Peter Ebdon	15550	18000	33550
7	▲	(Australia) Neil Robertson	12575	20550	33125
8	▼	(Scotland) Stephen Hendry	15100	17375	32475
9	▲	(China) Ding Junhui	14475	16325	30800
10	▼	(Scotland) Stephen Maguire	11000	19550	30550
11	▲	(England) Mark Selby	9125	18275	27400
12	▼	(Wales) Mark Williams	18300	8825	27125
13	▼	(England) Stephen Lee	13500	12650	26150
14	▲	(England) Ali Carter	9550	15750	25300
15	▼	(England) Steve Davis	13100	11850	24950
16	▲	(Wales) Ryan Day	10050	14450	24500

== World ranking points ==
No.	Ch	Player	Points 2006/07	SM	GP	NI	UK	WO	CO	WSC	Points 2007/08	Total
1	▲4	(England) Ronnie O'Sullivan	20750	700	5000	2500	7500	4000	0	10000	29700	50450
2	▲8	(Scotland) Stephen Maguire	19550	1900	2375	5000	6000	700	5000	5000	25975	45525
3		(England) Shaun Murphy	21350	700	4000	3200	4800	3200	4000	3800	23700	45050
4	▲7	(England) Mark Selby	18275	3200	1750	700	4800	5000	3200	1400	20050	38325
5	▼4	(Scotland) John Higgins	23100	1900	2375	700	1050	2500	2500	3800	14825	37925
6	▲2	(Scotland) Stephen Hendry	17375	1900	1750	1900	1050	3200	700	6400	16900	34275
7	▲7	(England) Ali Carter	15750	700	2375	1900	1050	2500	1900	8000	18425	34175
8	▲8	(Wales) Ryan Day	14450	4000	2375	1900	1050	1900	3200	5000	19425	33875
9	▼3	(England) Peter Ebdon	18000	700	3125	2500	1050	700	1900	5000	14975	32975
10	▼3	(Australia) Neil Robertson	20550	700	1750	2500	1050	1900	700	3800	12400	32950
11	▼2	(China) Ding Junhui	16325	1900	719	1900	3750	1900	1900	3800	15869	32194
12	▲6	(England) Joe Perry	12175	575	3125	1400	2850	2500	1400	6400	18250	30425
13	▼11	(Scotland) Graeme Dott	18675	3200	719	700	1050	700	700	1400	8469	27144
14	▲13	(Hong Kong) Marco Fu	8925	1400	6250	575	3750	1400	1900	2800	18075	27000
15	▲6	(England) Mark King	12325	575	1750	1400	2850	1400	1900	3800	13675	26000
16	▲13	(Northern Ireland) Mark Allen	10650	575	1750	3200	2850	1400	2500	2800	15075	25725

== Points distribution ==
2007/2008 Points distribution for world ranking events:

Tournament	Round →	L96	L80	L64	L48	L32	L16	QF	SF	F	W
Shanghai Masters	Unseeded loser	400	650	900	1150	1400	1900	2500	3200	4000	5000
Shanghai Masters	Seeded loser	200	325	450	575	700	–	–	–	–	–
Northern Ireland Trophy	Unseeded loser	400	650	900	1150	1400	1900	2500	3200	4000	5000
Northern Ireland Trophy	Seeded loser	200	325	450	575	700	–	–	–	–	–
UK Championship	Unseeded loser	600	975	1350	1725	2100	2850	3750	4800	6000	7500
UK Championship	Seeded loser	300	488	675	863	1050	–	–	–	–	–
Welsh Open	Unseeded loser	400	650	900	1150	1400	1900	2500	3200	4000	5000
Welsh Open	Seeded loser	200	325	450	575	700	–	–	–	–	–
China Open	Unseeded loser	400	650	900	1150	1400	1900	2500	3200	4000	5000
China Open	Seeded loser	200	325	450	575	700	–	–	–	–	–
World Championship	Unseeded loser	800	1300	1800	2300	2800	3800	5000	6400	8000	10000
World Championship	Seeded loser	400	650	900	1150	1400	–	–	–	–	–

Tournament	Stage 1 Group				Stage 2 Group		L16	QF	SF	F	W
Tournament	7–8	5–6	3–4	1–2	5–6	3–4	L16	QF	SF	F	W
Grand Prix	250	813	1125	1438	719 (Note: Only for seeded players)	1750	2375	3125	4000	5000	6250
