= 2007 Grand Prix (snooker) =

Royal London Watches Grand Prix

Tournament information
- Dates: 13–21 October 2007
- Venue: A.E.C.C.
- City: Aberdeen
- Country: Scotland
- Organisation: WPBSA
- Format: Ranking event
- Total prize fund: £470,500
- Winner's share: £75,000
- Highest break: Tom Ford (ENG) (147)

Final
- Champion: Marco Fu (HKG)
- Runner-up: Ronnie O'Sullivan (ENG)
- Score: 9–6

The 2007 Royal London Watches Grand Prix was a professional ranking snooker tournament that took place between 13 and 21 October 2007 at the A.E.C.C. in Aberdeen, Scotland.

Dave Harold made 14 consecutive foul and misses during his round-robin stage match against Liu Song. This is the most consecutive foul and misses made in any professional event.

Marco Fu won the title by defeating Ronnie O'Sullivan 9–6 in the final.

== Prize fund ==
The breakdown of prize money for this year is shown below:

- Winner: £75,000
- Runner-up: £35,000
- Semi-final: £20,000
- Quarter-final: £11,000
- Last 16: £7,000
- Main stage:
  - 3rd in group: £5,200
  - 4th in group: £5,000
  - 5th in group: £4,750
  - 6th in group: £4,500
- Qualifying stage:
  - 3rd–4th in group: £3,000
  - 5th–6th in group: £500
  - 7th–8th in group: £250
- Qualifying stage highest break: £500
- Televised stage highest break: £4,000
- Qualifying stage maximum break: £1,000
- Televised stage maximum break: £20,000
- Total: £470,500

== Ranking points ==
The breakdown of ranking points for this year is shown below:

- Winner: 6,250
- Runner-up: 5,000
- Semi-final: 4,000
- Quarter-final: 3,125
- Last 16: 2,376
- Main stage:
  - 3rd–4th in group: 1,750
  - 5th–6th in group: 719
- Qualifying stage:
  - 1st–2nd in group: 1,438
  - 3rd–4th in group: 1,125
  - 5th–6th in group: 813
  - 7th–8th in group: 250

== Main draw ==
=== Round-robin stage ===
The first round used a round-robin format like last season. The top 32 and the 16 qualifiers were placed in eight groups of six with the top two from each group qualifying for the knockout stage. Matches in the round-robins were the best of seven frames.

Tom Ford made a maximum break in his match against Steve Davis. For this feat he won £24,000.

==== Group 2A ====
Player	MP	MW	FW	FL	FD
Joe Swail (NIR)	5	4	18	11	+7
Joe Perry (ENG)	5	4	16	12	+4
Jimmy Michie (ENG)	5	2	14	14	0
Neil Robertson (AUS)	5	2	14	14	0
Stephen Lee (ENG)	5	2	13	16	−3
Mark Davis (ENG)	5	1	9	17	−8

- 13 October:
  - Neil Robertson 2–4 Jimmy Michie
  - Stephen Lee 2–4 Joe Swail
  - Joe Perry 4–1 Mark Davis
  - Neil Robertson 4–2 Mark Davis
  - Stephen Lee 3–4 Joe Perry
  - Joe Swail 4–3 Jimmy Michie
- 14 October:
  - Neil Robertson 4–0 Joe Perry
  - Stephen Lee 0–4 Jimmy Michie
  - Joe Swail 4–0 Mark Davis
  - Neil Robertson 2–4 Joe Swail
  - Stephen Lee 4–2 Mark Davis
  - Joe Perry 4–2 Jimmy Michie
- 16 October:
  - Neil Robertson 2–4 Stephen Lee
  - Joe Perry 4–2 Joe Swail
  - Mark Davis 4–1 Jimmy Michie

==== Group 2B ====
Player	MP	MW	FW	FL	FD
Ronnie O'Sullivan (ENG)	5	5	20	6	+14
Gerard Greene (NIR)	5	4	18	9	+9
Tom Ford (ENG)	5	2	17	15	+2
Dominic Dale (WAL)	5	2	11	17	−6
Steve Davis (ENG)	5	2	9	18	−9
Mark Joyce (ENG)	5	0	10	20	−10

- 13 October:
  - Ronnie O'Sullivan 4–0 Mark Joyce
  - Steve Davis 0–4 Gerard Greene
  - Dominic Dale 4–3 Tom Ford
  - Ronnie O'Sullivan 4–3 Tom Ford
  - Steve Davis 4–3 Dominic Dale
  - Gerard Greene 4–2 Mark Joyce
- 14 October:
  - Ronnie O'Sullivan 4–0 Dominic Dale
  - Mark Joyce 3–4 Steve Davis
- Gerard Greene 4–3 Tom Ford
- Ronnie O'Sullivan 4–2 Gerard Greene
- Steve Davis 0–4 Tom Ford
- Dominic Dale 4–2 Mark Joyce
- 15 October:
  - Ronnie O'Sullivan 4–1 Steve Davis
  - Dominic Dale 0–4 Gerard Greene
  - Tom Ford 4–3 Mark Joyce

==== Group 2C ====
Player	MP	MW	FW	FL	FD
Peter Ebdon (ENG)	5	5	20	12	+8
Liu Song (CHN)	5	3	16	12	+4
Matthew Stevens (WAL)	5	3	14	14	0
Mark Selby (ENG)	5	2	14	14	0
Dave Harold (ENG)	5	2	13	15	−2
Joe Delaney (IRL)	5	0	10	20	−10

- 13 October:
  - Peter Ebdon 4–3 Liu Song
  - Mark Selby 2–4 Dave Harold
  - Matthew Stevens 4–3 Joe Delaney
  - Peter Ebdon 4–3 Joe Delaney
  - Mark Selby 2–4 Matthew Stevens
  - Dave Harold 1–4 Liu Song
- 14 October:
  - Peter Ebdon 4–1 Matthew Stevens
  - Mark Selby 4–1 Liu Song
  - Dave Harold 4–1 Joe Delaney
  - Peter Ebdon 4–3 Dave Harold
  - Mark Selby 4–1 Joe Delaney
  - Matthew Stevens 1–4 Liu Song
- 16 October:
  - Peter Ebdon 4–2 Mark Selby
  - Matthew Stevens 4–1 Dave Harold
  - Joe Delaney 2–4 Liu Song

==== Group 2D ====
Player	MP	MW	FW	FL	FD
Shaun Murphy (ENG)	5	4	19	11	+8
Marco Fu (HKG)	5	4	19	14	+5
Stuart Pettman (ENG)	5	3	16	13	+3
Stuart Bingham (ENG)	5	2	13	13	0
Ding Junhui (CHN)	5	2	13	14	−1
Ben Woollaston (ENG)	5	0	5	20	−15

- 13 October:
  - Shaun Murphy 4–0 Ben Woollaston
  - Ding Junhui 1–4 Marco Fu
  - Stuart Bingham 0–4 Stuart Pettman
  - Shaun Murphy 4–2 Stuart Pettman
  - Ding Junhui 1–4 Stuart Bingham
  - Marco Fu 4–3 Ben Woollaston
- 14 October:
  - Shaun Murphy 4–2 Stuart Bingham
  - Ding Junhui 4–0 Ben Woollaston
  - Stuart Pettman 4–3 Marco Fu
  - Shaun Murphy 3–4 Marco Fu
  - Ding Junhui 4–2 Stuart Pettman
  - Stuart Bingham 4–0 Ben Woollaston
- 15 October:
  - Shaun Murphy 4–3 Ding Junhui
  - Stuart Bingham 3–4 Marco Fu
  - Stuart Pettman 4–2 Ben Woollaston

==== Group 2E ====
Player	MP	MW	FW	FL	FD
Ali Carter (ENG)	5	5	20	4	+16
Marcus Campbell (SCO)	5	4	16	14	+2
Michael Holt (ENG)	5	3	15	14	+1
Anthony Hamilton (ENG)	5	2	14	13	+1
Fergal O'Brien (IRL)	5	1	10	18	−8
Graeme Dott (SCO)	5	0	8	20	−12

- 15 October:
  - Graeme Dott 3–4 Ali Carter
  - Anthony Hamilton 3–4 Michael Holt
  - Fergal O'Brien 3–4 Marcus Campbell
  - Graeme Dott 2–4 Marcus Campbell
  - Ali Carter 4–1 Michael Holt
  - Anthony Hamilton 4–1 Fergal O'Brien
- 16 October:
  - Graeme Dott 0–4 Anthony Hamilton
  - Ali Carter 4–0 Marcus Campbell
  - Michael Holt 4–2 Fergal O'Brien
- 17 October:
  - Graeme Dott 1–4 Michael Holt
  - Ali Carter 4–0 Fergal O'Brien
  - Anthony Hamilton 3–4 Marcus Campbell
  - Graeme Dott 2–4 Fergal O'Brien
  - Ali Carter 4–0 Anthony Hamilton
  - Michael Holt 2–4 Marcus Campbell

==== Group 2F ====
Player	MP	MW	FW	FL	FD
Ricky Walden (ENG)	5	4	18	10	+8
Michael Judge (IRL)	5	4	18	14	+4
Mark Allen (NIR)	5	3	15	15	0
Mark Williams (WAL)	5	2	14	17	−3
Ken Doherty (IRL)	5	1	13	17	−4
Ian McCulloch (ENG)	5	1	14	19	−5

- 15 October:
  - Ken Doherty 3–4 Michael Judge
  - Mark Williams 2–4 Mark Allen
  - Ian McCulloch 2–4 Ricky Walden
- 16 October:
  - Ken Doherty 0–4 Ricky Walden
  - Mark Williams 4–3 Ian McCulloch
  - Mark Allen 2–4 Michael Judge
  - Ken Doherty 3–4 Ian McCulloch
  - Mark Williams 4–2 Micheal Judge
  - Mark Allen 1–4 Ricky Walden
- 17 October:
  - Ken Doherty 3–4 Mark Allen
  - Mark Williams 3–4 Ricky Walden
  - Ian McCulloch 3–4 Michael Judge
  - Ken Doherty 4–1 Mark Williams
  - Ian McCulloch 2–4 Mark Allen
  - Ricky Walden 2–4 Michael Judge

==== Group 2G ====
Player	MP	MW	FW	FL	FD
Stephen Maguire (SCO)	5	4	17	9	+8
Barry Hawkins (ENG)	5	3	16	13	+3
Stephen Hendry (SCO)	5	3	17	16	+1
Rory McLeod (ENG)	5	3	16	15	+1
Paul Davies (WAL)	5	2	13	18	−5
Jamie Cope (ENG)	5	0	12	20	−8

- 15 October:
  - Stephen Hendry 2–4 Stephen Maguire
  - Barry Hawkins 4–2 Jamie Cope
  - Paul Davies 3–4 Rory McLeod
  - Stephen Hendry 4–2 Rory McLeod
  - Stephen Maguire 4–1 Jamie Cope
  - Barry Hawkins 4–2 Paul Davies
- 16 October:
  - Stephen Hendry 4–3 Barry Hawkins
  - Stephen Maguire 4–2 Rory McLeod
  - Jamie Cope 3–4 Paul Davies
- 17 October:
  - Stephen Hendry 4–3 Jamie Cope
  - Stephen Maguire 4–0 Paul Davies
  - Barry Hawkins 1–4 Rory McLeod
  - Stephen Hendry 3–4 Paul Davies
  - Stephen Maguire 1–4 Barry Hawkins
  - Jamie Cope 3–4 Rory McLeod

==== Group 2H ====
Player	MP	MW	FW	FL	FD
John Higgins (SCO)	5	5	20	6	+14
Ryan Day (WAL)	5	3	17	10	+7
Nigel Bond (ENG)	5	2	12	14	−2
Mark King (ENG)	5	2	11	13	−2
Tian Pengfei (CHN)	5	2	12	17	−5
Andrew Norman (ENG)	5	1	7	19	−12

- 15 October:
  - John Higgins 4–2 Tian Pengfei
  - Ryan Day 4–2 Nigel Bond
  - Mark King 4–1 Andrew Norman
- 16 October:
  - John Higgins 4–0 Andrew Norman
  - Ryan Day 4–0 Mark King
  - Nigel Bond 4–2 Tian Pengfei
  - John Higgins 4–0 Mark King
  - Ryan Day 4–0 Tian Pengfei
  - Nigel Bond 4–0 Andrew Norman
- 17 October:
  - John Higgins 4–2 Nigel Bond
  - Ryan Day 3–4 Andrew Norman
  - Mark King 3–4 Tian Pengfei
  - John Higgins 4–2 Ryan Day
  - Mark King 4–0 Nigel Bond
  - Andrew Norman 2–4 Tian Pengfei

=== Knockout stage ===
Last 16; Best of 9 frames
Joe Swail (NIR)	5
Marcus Campbell (SCO)	2
Ronnie O'Sullivan (ENG)	5
Michael Judge (IRL)	2
Peter Ebdon (ENG)	5
Barry Hawkins (ENG)	2
Shaun Murphy (ENG)	5
Ryan Day (WAL)	3
Ali Carter (ENG)	3
Joe Perry (ENG)	5
Ricky Walden (ENG)	0
Gerard Greene (NIR)	5
Stephen Maguire (SCO)	3
Liu Song (CHN)	5
John Higgins (SCO)	4
Marco Fu (HKG)	5

Quarter-finals; Best of 9 frames
(Northern Ireland) Joe Swail	3
(England) Ronnie O'Sullivan	5
(England) Peter Ebdon	3
(England) Shaun Murphy	5
(England) Joe Perry	3
(Northern Ireland) Gerard Greene	5
(China) Liu Song	0
(Hong Kong) Marco Fu	5

Semi-finals; Best of 11 frames
(England) Ronnie O'Sullivan	6
(England) Shaun Murphy	5
(Northern Ireland) Gerard Greene	5
(Hong Kong) Marco Fu	6

Final; Best of 17 frames
(England) Ronnie O'Sullivan	6
(Hong Kong) Marco Fu	9

== Final ==
Final: Best of 17 frames. Referee: Jan Verhaas. Aberdeen Exhibition and Conference Centre, Aberdeen, Scotland, 21 October 2007.
Ronnie O'Sullivan; England	6–9	Marco Fu; Hong Kong
Afternoon: 21–100 (78), 104–35 (85), 0–110 (110), 18–84 (74), 127–0 (127), 75–0 (75), 64–33; Evening: 67–5, 0–99, 4–95 (94), 5–121 (117), 0–82 (62), 66–44 (65), 58–60 (52, 60), 0–76 (76)
127	Highest break	117
1	Century breaks	2
5	50+ breaks	8

== Qualifying ==
Qualifying for the 2007 Grand Prix was held between 17 September and 23 September 2007 at Pontin's Prestatyn using a round-robin format. The entries were placed into eight groups with the top 2 from each group qualifying for the finals in Aberdeen. All matches at this stage were played over the best of seven frames.

=== Group 1A ===
Player	MP	MW	FW	FL	FD
Mark Davis (ENG)	7	5	25	15	+10
Mark Joyce (ENG)	7	4	25	17	+8
Jimmy White (ENG)	7	4	21	21	0
Robert Milkins (ENG)	7	4	20	22	−2
Jimmy Robertson (ENG)	7	3	23	22	+1
Supoj Saenla (THA)	7	3	18	20	−2
Alex Davies (ENG)	7	3	15	24	−9
Scott MacKenzie (SCO)	7	2	20	26	−6

- 17 September:
  - Robert Milkins 4–2 Mark Davis
  - Jimmy White 4–3 Scott MacKenzie
  - Alex Davies 0–4 Mark Joyce
  - Jimmy Robertson 3–4 Supoj Saenla
  - Robert Milkins 3–4 Jimmy White
  - Mark Davis 4–1 Scott MacKenzie
  - Alex Davies 4–3 Jimmy Robertson
  - Mark Joyce 4–0 Supoj Saenla
- 18 September:
  - Robert Milkins 4–3 Scott MacKenzie
  - Mark Davis 4–0 Supoj Saenla
  - Jimmy White 4–0 Alex Davies
  - Mark Joyce 4–3 Jimmy Robertson
  - Robert Milkins 4–2 Alex Davies
  - Scott MacKenzie 4–3 Mark Joyce
  - Mark Davis 4–2 Jimmy Robertson
  - Jimmy White 4–3 Supoj Saenla
- 19 September:
  - Robert Milkins 4–3 Mark Joyce
  - Mark Davis 4–1 Jimmy White
  - Scott MacKenzie 3–4 Jimmy Robertson
  - Alex Davies 1–4 Supoj Saenla
  - Robert Milkins 1–4 Jimmy Robertson
  - Mark Davis 3–4 Alex Davies
  - Scott MacKenzie 4–3 Supoj Saenla
  - Jimmy White 2–4 Mark Joyce
- 20 September:
  - Robert Milkins 0–4 Supoj Saenla
  - Mark Davis 4–3 Mark Joyce
  - Jimmy White 2–4 Jimmy Robertson
  - Scott MacKenzie 2–4 Alex Davies

=== Group 1B ===
Player	MP	MW	FW	FL	FD
Tom Ford (ENG)	7	6	25	10	+15
Jimmy Michie (ENG)	7	4	22	14	+8
Tony Drago (MLT)	7	4	20	19	+1
James McBain (SCO)	7	4	18	18	0
Andrew Higginson (ENG)	7	3	20	17	+3
James Wattana (THA)	7	3	17	19	−2
Gareth Coppack (WAL)	7	2	9	22	−13
Michael White (WAL)	7	1	14	26	−12

- 17 September:
  - Andrew Higginson 4–1 James Wattana
  - Tom Ford 4–1 Jimmy Michie
  - James McBain 1–4 Tony Drago
  - Michael White 1–4 Gareth Coppack
  - Andrew Higginson 1–4 Tom Ford
  - James Wattana 0–4 Jimmy Michie
  - James McBain 4–3 Michael White
  - Tony Drago 1–4 Gareth Coppack
- 18 September:
  - Andrew Higginson 2–4 Jimmy Michie
  - James Wattana 4–0 Gareth Coppack
  - Tom Ford 1–4 James McBain
  - Tony Drago 2–4 Michael White
  - Andrew Higginson 2–4 James McBain
  - Jimmy Michie 1–4 Tony Drago
  - James Wattana 4–3 Michael White
  - Tom Ford 4–0 Gareth Coppack
- 19 September:
  - Andrew Higginson 3–4 Tony Drago
  - James Wattana 2–4 Tom Ford
  - Jimmy Michie 4–2 Michael White
  - James McBain 4–0 Gareth Coppack
  - Andrew Higginson 4–0 Michael White
  - James Wattana 4–0 James McBain
  - Jimmy Michie 4–1 Gareth Coppack
  - Tom Ford 4–1 Tony Drago
- 20 September:
  - Andrew Higginson 4–0 Gareth Coppack
  - James Wattana 2–4 Tony Drago
  - Tom Ford 4–1 Michael White
  - Jimmy Michie 4–1 James McBain

=== Group 1C ===
Player	MP	MW	FW	FL	FD
Joe Delaney (IRL)	7	5	25	16	+9
Ben Woollaston (ENG)	7	5	23	19	+4
Barry Pinches (ENG)	7	4	19	15	+4
David Gilbert (ENG)	7	4	20	17	+3
Issara Kachaiwong (THA)	7	3	19	22	−3
David Gray (ENG)	7	3	19	23	−4
Leo Fernandez (IRL)	7	2	17	23	−6
Lee Spick (ENG)	7	2	17	24	−7

- 17 September:
  - David Gilbert 4–2 David Gray
  - Barry Pinches 0–4 Joe Delaney
  - Leo Fernandez 2–4 Lee Spick
  - Issara Kachaiwong 3–4 Ben Woollaston
  - David Gilbert 4–1 Barry Pinches
  - David Gray 1–4 Joe Delaney
  - Leo Fernandez 2–4 Issara Kachaiwong
  - Lee Spick 4–2 Ben Woollaston
- 18 September:
  - David Gilbert 2–4 Joe Delaney
  - David Gray 1–4 Ben Woollaston
  - Barry Pinches 4–0 Leo Fernandez
  - Lee Spick 1–4 Issara Kachaiwong
  - David Gilbert 1–4 Leo Fernandez
  - Joe Delaney 4–3 Lee Spick
  - David Gray 3–4 Issara Kachaiwong
  - Barry Pinches 4–1 Ben Woollaston
- 19 September:
  - David Gilbert 4–0 Lee Spick
  - David Gray 4–2 Barry Pinches
  - Joe Delaney 4–2 Issara Kachaiwong
  - Leo Fernandez 3–4 Ben Woollaston
  - David Gilbert 4–2 Issara Kachaiwong
  - David Gray 4–2 Leo Fernandez
  - Joe Delaney 3–4 Ben Woollaston
  - Barry Pinches 4–2 Lee Spick
- 20 September:
  - David Gilbert 1–4 Ben Woollaston
  - David Gray 4–3 Lee Spick
  - Barry Pinches 4–0 Issara Kachaiwong
  - Joe Delaney 2–4 Leo Fernandez

=== Group 1D ===
Player	MP	MW	FW	FL	FD
Stuart Pettman (ENG)	7	7	28	12	+16
Liu Song (CHN)	7	5	23	16	+7
Andy Hicks (ENG)	7	4	22	17	+5
Xiao Guodong (CHN)	7	3	19	20	−1
Jamie Burnett (SCO)	7	3	20	23	−3
Mike Dunn (ENG)	7	3	17	23	−6
Kurt Maflin (NOR)	7	2	20	21	−1
Ashley Wright (ENG)	7	1	9	26	−17

- 17 September:
  - Jamie Burnett 4–3 Andy Hicks
  - Stuart Pettman 4–3 Mike Dunn
  - Kurt Maflin 2–4 Liu Song
  - Xiao Guodong 4–1 Ashley Wright
  - Jamie Burnett 3–4 Stuart Pettman
  - Andy Hicks 4–1 Mike Dunn
  - Kurt Maflin 3–4 Xiao Guodong
  - Liu Song 4–1 Ashley Wright
- 18 September:
  - Jamie Burnett 3–4 Mike Dunn
  - Andy Hicks 4–1 Ashley Wright
  - Stuart Pettman 4–3 Kurt Maflin
  - Liu Song 4–2 Xiao Guodong
  - Jamie Burnett 0–4 Kurt Maflin
  - Mike Dunn 1–4 Liu Song
  - Andy Hicks 4–2 Xiao Guodong
  - Stuart Pettman 4–0 Ashley Wright
- 19 September:
  - Jamie Burnett 4–3 Liu Song
  - Andy Hicks 1–4 Stuart Pettman
  - Mike Dunn 0–4 Xiao Guodong
  - Kurt Maflin 4–1 Ashley Wright
  - Jamie Burnett 4–1 Xiao Guodong
  - Andy Hicks 4–1 Kurt Maflin
  - Mike Dunn 4–1 Ashley Wright
  - Stuart Pettman 4–0 Liu Song
- 20 September:
  - Jamie Burnett 2–4 Ashley Wright
  - Andy Hicks 2–4 Liu Song
  - Stuart Pettman 4–2 Xiao Guodong
  - Mike Dunn 4–3 Kurt Maflin

=== Group 1E ===
Player	MP	MW	FW	FL	FD
Fergal O'Brien (IRL)	7	6	26	12	+14
Michael Judge (IRL)	7	6	25	13	+12
Joe Jogia (ENG)	7	4	21	18	+3
David Roe (ENG)	7	4	21	18	+3
Matthew Selt (ENG)	7	3	20	20	0
Rodney Goggins (IRL)	7	2	17	22	−5
Drew Henry (SCO)	7	2	13	25	−12
Kevin Van Hove (BEL)	7	1	11	26	−15

- 20 September:
  - Fergal O'Brien 4–1 Michael Judge
  - David Roe 4–2 Drew Henry
  - Matthew Selt 3–4 Joe Jogia
  - Rodney Goggins 4–1 Kevin Van Hove
- 21 September:
  - Fergal O'Brien 4–0 David Roe
  - Michael Judge 4–1 Drew Henry
  - Matthew Selt 4–3 Rodney Goggins
  - Joe Jogia 4–1 Kevin Van Hove
  - Fergal O'Brien 2–4 Drew Henry
  - Michael Judge 4–2 Kevin van Hove
  - David Roe 4–2 Matthew Selt
  - Joe Jogia 1–4 Rodney Goggins
- 22 September:
  - Fergal O'Brien 4–2 Matthew Selt
  - Drew Henry 0–4 Joe Jogia
  - Michael Judge 4–1 Rodney Goggins
  - David Roe 4–1 Kevin Van Hove
  - Fergal O'Brien 4–3 Joe Jogia
  - Michael Judge 4–3 David Roe
  - Drew Henry 4–3 Rodney Goggins
  - Matthew Selt 4–1 Kevin Van Hove
- 23 September:
  - Fergal O'Brien 4–1 Rodney Goggins
  - Michael Judge 4–1 Matthew Selt
  - Drew Henry 1–4 Kevin Van Hove
  - David Roe 2–4 Joe Jogia
  - Fergal O'Brien 4–1 Kevin Van Hove
  - Michael Judge 4–1 Joe Jogia
  - David Roe 4–1 Rodney Goggins
  - Drew Henry 0–4 Matthew Selt

=== Group 1F ===
Player	MP	MW	FW	FL	FD
Ricky Walden (ENG)	7	6	25	16	+9
Marcus Campbell (SCO)	7	5	23	12	+11
Robin Hull (FIN)	7	4	23	19	+4
Munraj Pal (ENG)	7	4	23	20	+3
Martin Gould (ENG)	7	4	21	19	+2
David Morris (IRL)	7	3	24	21	+3
Steve Mifsud (AUS)	7	1	13	27	−14
John Parrott (ENG)	7	1	8	26	−18

- 20 September:
  - John Parrott 1–4 Ricky Walden
  - Robin Hull 1–4 Marcus Campbell
  - Munraj Pal 4–3 David Morris
  - Steve Mifsud 1–4 Martin Gould
- 21 September:
  - John Parrott 0–4 Robin Hull
  - Ricky Walden 1–4 Marcus Campbell
  - Munraj Pal 3–4 Steve Mifsud
  - David Morris 3–4 Martin Gould
  - John Parrott 2–4 Marcus Campbell
  - Ricky Walden 4–2 Martin Gould
  - Robin Hull 4–3 Munraj Pal
  - David Morris 4–3 Steve Mifsud
- 22 September:
  - John Parrott 1–4 Munraj Pal
  - Marcus Campbell 2–4 David Morris
  - Ricky Walden 4–2 Steve Mifsud
  - David Roe 3–4 Martin Gould
  - John Parrott 0–4 David Morris
  - Ricky Walden 4–3 Robin Hull
  - Marcus Campbell 4–0 Steve Mifsud
  - Munraj Pal 4–3 Martin Gould
- 23 September:
  - John Parrott 4–2 Steve Mifsud
  - Ricky Walden 4–1 Munraj Pal
  - Marcus Campbell 4–0 Martin Gould
  - Robin Hull 4–3 David Morris
  - John Parrott 0–4 Martin Gould
  - Ricky Walden 4–3 David Morris
  - Robin Hull 4–1 Steve Mifsud
  - Marcus Campbell 1–4 Munraj Pal

=== Group 1G ===
Player	MP	MW	FW	FL	FD
Paul Davies (WAL)	7	5	25	11	+14
Tian Pengfei (CHN)	7	5	24	20	+4
Fraser Patrick (SCO)	7	4	21	20	+1
Ian Preece (WAL)	7	3	17	17	0
Lee Walker (WAL)	7	3	17	19	−2
Alan McManus (SCO)	7	3	19	23	−4
Adrian Gunnell (ENG)	7	3	14	22	−8
Liu Chuang (CHN)	7	2	18	23	−5

- 20 September:
  - Alan McManus 3–4 Adrian Gunnell
  - Paul Davies 4–1 Ian Preece
  - Lee Walker 4–3 Tian Pengfei
  - Liu Chuang 3–4 Fraser Patrick
- 21 September:
  - Alan McManus 0–4 Paul Davies
  - Adrian Gunnell 0–4 Ian Preece
  - Lee Walker 4–0 Liu Chuang
  - Tian Pengfei 4–2 Fraser Patrick
  - Alan McManus 1–4 Ian Preece
  - Adrian Gunnell 4–2 Fraser Patrick
  - Paul Davies 4–0 Lee Walker
  - Tian Pengfei 4–3 Liu Chuang.
- 22 September:
  - Alan McManus 4–3 Lee Walker
  - Ian Preece 2–4 Tian Pengfei
  - Adrian Gunnell 1–4 Liu Chuang
  - Paul Davies 3–4 Fraser Patrick
  - Alan McManus 3–4 Tian Pengfei
  - Adrian Gunnell 1–4 Paul Davies
  - Ian Preece 2–4 Liu Chuang
  - Lee Walker 2–4 Fraser Patrick
- 23 September:
  - Alan McManus 4–3 Liu Chuang
  - Adrian Gunnell 0–4 Lee Walker
  - Ian Preece 0–4 Fraser Patrick
  - Paul Davies 2–4 Tian Pengfei
  - Alan McManus 4–1 Fraser Patrick
  - Adrian Gunnell 4–1 Tian Pengfei
  - Paul Davies 4–1 Liu Chuang
  - Ian Preece 4–0 Lee Walker

=== Group 1H ===
Player	MP	MW	FW	FL	FD
Andrew Norman (ENG)	7	6	25	12	+13
Rory McLeod (ENG)	7	5	23	14	+9
Liang Wenbo (CHN)	7	5	22	19	+3
Patrick Wallace (NIR)	7	4	22	19	+3
Alfred Burden (ENG)	7	3	15	17	−2
Judd Trump (ENG)	7	3	19	22	−3
Rod Lawler (ENG)	7	1	19	25	−6
Jamie O'Neill (ENG)	7	1	17	27	−10

- 20 September:
  - Andrew Norman 1–4 Rory McLeod
  - Judd Trump 4–2 Rod Lawler
  - Jamie O'Neill 1–4 Liang Wenbo
  - Alfred Burden 0–4 Patrick Wallace
- 21 September:
  - Andrew Norman 4–1 Judd Trump
  - Rory McLeod 4–1 Rod Lawler
  - Jamie O'Neill 0–4 Alfred Burden
  - Liang Wenbo 4–3 Patrick Wallace
  - Andrew Norman 4–3 Rod Lawler
  - Rory McLeod 2–4 Patrick Wallace
  - Judd Trump 4–2 Jamie O'Neill
  - Liang Wenbo 0–4 Alfred Burden
- 22 September:
  - Andrew Norman 4–1 Jamie O'Neill
  - Rod Lawler 3–4 Liang Wenbo
  - Rory McLeod 4–2 Alfred Burden
  - Judd Trump 4–2 Patrick Wallace
  - Andrew Norman 4–2 Liang Wenbo
  - Rory McLeod 4–2 Judd Trump
  - Rod Lawler 4–1 Alfred Burden
  - Jamie O'Neill 2–4 Patrick Wallace
- 23 September:
  - Andrew Norman 4–0 Alfred Burden
  - Rory McLeod 4–0 Jamie O'Neill
  - Rod Lawler 3–4 Patrick Wallace
  - Judd Trump 3–4 Liang Wenbo
  - Andrew Norman 4–1 Patrick Wallace
  - Rory McLeod 1–4 Liang Wenbo
  - Judd Trump 1–4 Alfred Burden
  - Rod Lawler 3–4 Jamie O'Neill

== Century breaks ==
=== Qualifying stage centuries ===
- 147, 126, 108 – Jamie Burnett
- 142 – Issara Kachaiwong
- 141 – Xiao Guodong
- 140, 133, 117, 102 – Liu Song
- 136 – David Gray
- 135 – Alex Davies
- 133 – Jimmy White
- 132, 100 – Fergal O'Brien
- 132 – David Gilbert
- 130 – Scott MacKenzie
- 129, 128, 118 – Tom Ford
- 128, 127 – Rod Lawler
- 128, 108 – Tony Drago
- 128 – David Roe
- 127, 125, 121, 112, 102 – Mark Davis
- 127, 125, 103 – Kurt Maflin
- 126, 122, 101, 100 – Robin Hull
- 122 – Andy Hicks
- 121, 116 – Andrew Higginson
- 119, 110 – Judd Trump
- 119 – Rory McLeod
- 115, 107 – Marcus Campbell
- 113 – David Morris
- 112, 111 – Ricky Walden
- 112, 107 – Supoj Saenla
- 112 – Adrian Gunnell
- 111, 100 – Munraj Pal
- 107 – Michael Judge
- 106 – Liang Wenbo
- 106 – Matthew Selt
- 105 – Steve Mifsud
- 103 – James McBain
- 103 – Stuart Pettman
- 103 – Drew Henry
- 102, 101 – Leo Fernandez
- 100 – Jimmy Michie

=== Televised stage centuries ===
- 147, 122, 117, 113, 104 – Tom Ford
- 143, 111, 110 – Dave Harold
- 138, 119 – Anthony Hamilton
- 138, 108 – Shaun Murphy
- 138 – Jamie Cope
- 137, 135, 127, 125, 123, 119, 100 – Ronnie O'Sullivan
- 134, 110, 107, 103 – Peter Ebdon
- 134 – Michael Judge
- 133, 119, 117, 110, 109, 106, 105, 103, 101 – Marco Fu
- 133 – Graeme Dott
- 131, 102 – Mark Selby
- 130, 104, 104 – Stephen Maguire
- 124, 103 – Stuart Bingham
- 123, 101 – Gerard Greene
- 119, 112, 110, 107 – John Higgins
- 114, 107, 100 – Ryan Day
- 113, 112, 102 – Liu Song
- 113 – Nigel Bond
- 112, 101 – Ali Carter
- 103 – Stephen Hendry
- 102 – Tian Pengfei
- 102 – Mark Allen
- 101 – Marcus Campbell
- 100 – Stuart Pettman
