= Liu Song (snooker player) =

Chinese snooker player

Personal information
- Born: December 8, 1983 (age 42) Tianjin, China

Sport
- Country: China
- Sport: Snooker
- Professional: 2003–2005, 2006–2012
- Highest ranking: 53 (2008/2009)
- Best ranking finish: Quarter-final (x1)

Liu Song (Chinese: 刘崧; born 8 December 1983) is a Chinese former professional snooker player from Tianjin.

== Life and career ==
In 2003, Liu reached the final of the IBSF Under 21 World Championship, in Taupō, New Zealand. Liu faced Neil Robertson, with the score being 11–5 in the Australian's favour.

Liu was the first Chinese player to qualify for the final stages of a ranking tournament, the 2004 Welsh Open. To get to the tournament, Liu played four qualifying matches, the fourth against Fergal O'Brien. Liu was eventually knocked out of the tournament by Marco Fu.

Liu's best performance in a ranking tournament to date has been in the 2007 Grand Prix, where he reached the quarter-finals, where he lost to Marco Fu again, 0–5.

In 2010 Liu became the first Chinese player to attain the World Snooker coaching badge.

Since 2008 Liu has been managed by Romford-based Grove Leisure and is a stablemate of Ronnie O'Sullivan.

Liu finished the 2011/2012 season outside the top 64, therefore he would be relegated from the main tour and dropped from the world rankings.

== Performance and ranking timeline ==
Tournament	2003/ 04	2004/ 05	2005/ 06	2006/ 07	2007/ 08	2008/ 09	2009/ 10	2010/ 11	2011/ 12
Ranking	(Note: New players on the Main Tour don't have a ranking.)	90	(Note: He was an amateur.)	(Note: New players on the Main Tour don't have a ranking.)	72	53	59	62	65
Ranking tournaments
Australian Goldfields Open	Not held								LQ
Shanghai Masters	Not held				LQ	LQ	LQ	LQ	LQ
UK Championship	LQ	A	A	LQ	LQ	LQ	LQ	A	LQ
German Masters	Not held							WR	1R
Welsh Open	1R	LQ	A	LQ	LQ	LQ	1R	LQ	LQ
World Open (Note: The event was called the LG Cup (2001/2002-2003/2004) and the Grand Prix (1998/1999-2000/2001 and 2004/2005-2009/2010)	LQ	A	A	LQ	QF	LQ	LQ	2R	LQ
Players Tour Championship Finals	Not held							DNQ	DNQ
China Open (Note: The event was called the China International (1998/1999))	NH	WR	A	LQ	LQ	LQ	LQ	LQ	LQ
World Championship	LQ	LQ	A	LQ	LQ	LQ	LQ	LQ	LQ
Non-ranking tournaments
The Masters	A	A	A	LQ	A	A	LQ	A	A
Shoot-Out	Not held							A	1R
Former ranking tournaments
British Open	LQ	LQ	Not held						
Irish Masters	LQ	LQ	NH	NR	Not held				
Malta Cup (Note: The event was called the European Open (2001/2002-2003/2004) and the Irish Open (1998/1999))	LQ	LQ	A	LQ	NR	Not held			
Northern Ireland Trophy	Not held		NR	LQ	1R	LQ	Not held		
Bahrain Championship	Not held					LQ	Not held		
Former non-ranking tournaments
Masters Qualifying Event	LQ	NH	A	1R	A	A	3R	Not held	

Performance Table Legend
LQ	lost in the qualifying draw	#R	lost in the early rounds of the tournament (WR = Wildcard round, RR = Round robin)	QF	lost in the quarter-finals
SF	lost in the semi–finals	F	lost in the final	W	won the tournament
DNQ	did not qualify for the tournament	A	did not participate in the tournament	1R	withdrew from the tournament

NH / Not held	means an event was not held.
NR / Non-ranking event	means an event is/was no longer a ranking event.

== Career finals ==
=== Amateur finals: 1 ===
Outcome	No.	Year	Championship	Opponent in the final	Score
Runner-up	1.	2003	World Under-21 Championship	(Australia) Neil Robertson	5–11
