= Northern Ireland Trophy =

Snooker tournament

Tournament information
- Venue: Waterfront Hall
- Location: Belfast
- Country: Northern Ireland
- Established: 1981
- Organisation(s): World Professional Billiards and Snooker Association
- Format: Ranking event
- Total prize fund: £200,500
- Final year: 2008
- Final champion: (England) Ronnie O'Sullivan

The Northern Ireland Trophy was a professional snooker tournament.

== History ==
First contested in 1981 and named Northern Ireland Classic. It was an invitational event held at Ulster Hall, Belfast, and Jimmy White beat Steve Davis in the final.

The event was revived for the 2005/06 season as an invitational event and was contested by 20 players. From the 2006/07 season, it became a full ranking event, attended by the world's top 32 players plus 16 qualifiers.

The event was the first ranking tournament to be held in Northern Ireland and has been staged as part of World Snooker's continuing efforts to popularise the game in more territories. The tournament took place at the Waterfront Hall, Belfast. It has been the opening event of the season, other than in 2007 when it was held in November. Prize money for 2006 totalled £200,500 with the winner receiving £30,000.

In the 2006 event Ronnie O'Sullivan broke a world record during his semi-final against Dominic Dale; he won the match in 53 minutes of play, which was the fastest ever time in a best-of-11 match. At the 2007 event, O'Sullivan established another record in his 3rd round 5–2 win over Ali Carter by becoming the only player to win a match in a ranking tournament by compiling a century break in every winning frame. O'Sullivan also compiled a maximum break in the same match.

== Winners ==
Year	Winner	Runner-up	Final score	Venue	Season
Northern Ireland Classic (non-ranking)
1981	(England) Jimmy White	(England) Steve Davis	11–9	Belfast	1981/82
Northern Ireland Trophy (non-ranking)
2005	(Wales) Matthew Stevens	(Scotland) Stephen Hendry	9–7	Belfast	2005/06
Northern Ireland Trophy (ranking)
2006	(China) Ding Junhui	(England) Ronnie O'Sullivan	9–6	Belfast	2006/07
2007	(Scotland) Stephen Maguire	(Republic of Ireland) Fergal O'Brien	9–5	Belfast	2007/08
2008	(England) Ronnie O'Sullivan	(England) Dave Harold	9–3	Belfast	2008/09

== See also ==
- Irish Open
- Irish Professional Championship
- Northern Ireland Open
