= Fraser Patrick =

Scottish snooker player (born 1985)

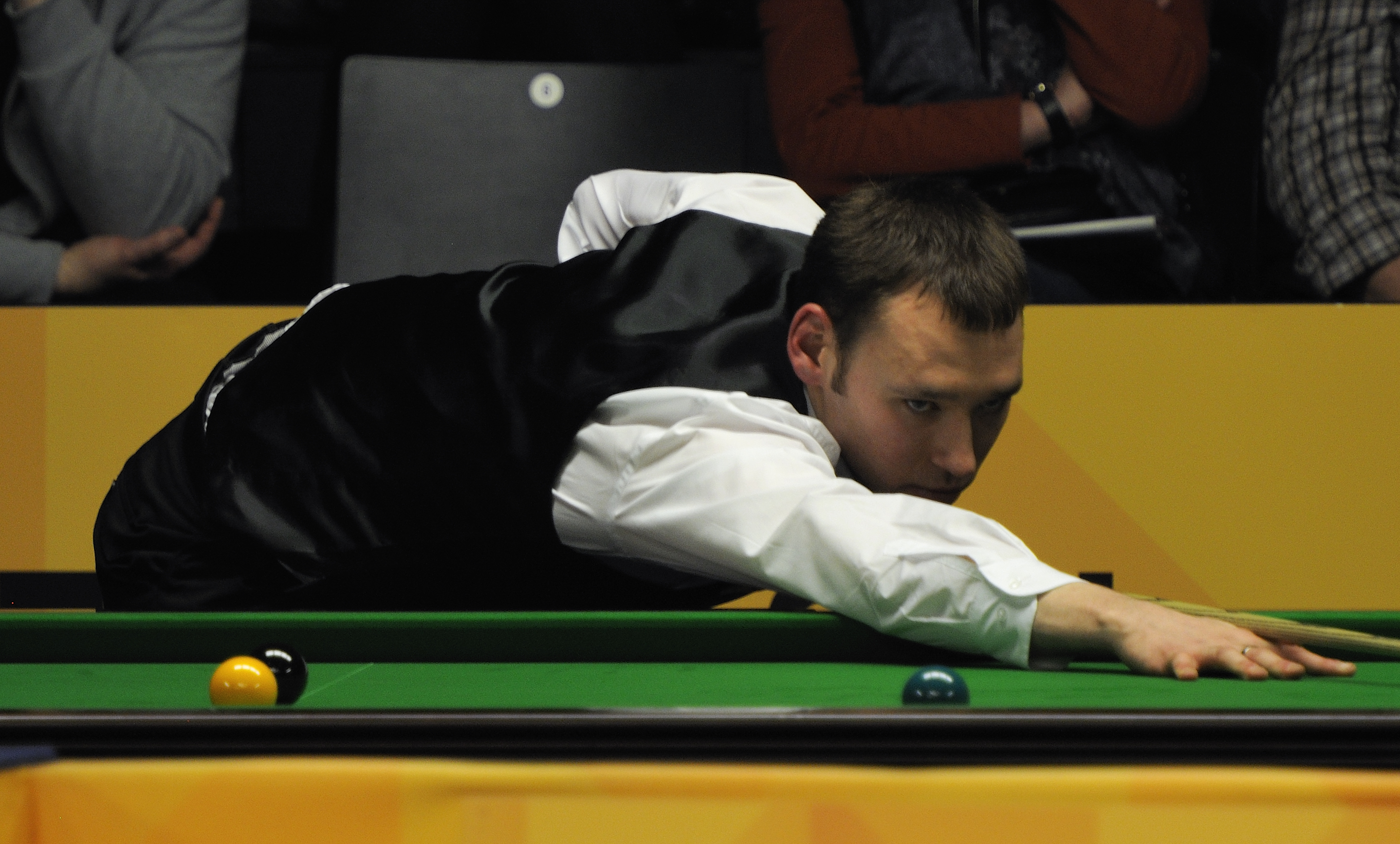
- German Masters 2013

Personal information
- Born: 8 November 1985 (age 40) Glasgow, Scotland

Sport
- Country: Scotland
- Sport: Snooker
- Professional: 2007/2008, 2013–2017, 2019–2023
- Highest ranking: 75 (December 2014 – April 2015)
- Best ranking finish: Last 16 (x2)

Fraser Patrick (born 8 November 1985) is a Scottish former professional snooker player from Glasgow.

== Career ==
Patrick started his professional career in 2002 by playing Challenge Tour, where he spent three seasons without success. In 2007 Patrick earned the Scottish nomination to make his Main Tour debut. Aside from Grand Prix, where he won four matches at the round-robin qualifying stage and finished third in his group, he was to struggle for wins during his debut season and was relegated from the tour.

With the introduction of Q School, Patrick came agonisingly close to regaining his tour place, twice losing his final match both in 2011 and 2012. Nevertheless, thanks to his high Q School ranking Patrick was able to compete in all the major ranking tournaments of the 2012/13 season as an amateur. He enjoyed his best ever performance at the 2013 German Masters, where he beat Michael White and Martin Gould to qualify to the venue stages and was leading Ali Carter 3–1 before eventually losing 5–3. He also recorded an impressive 10–6 win against Luca Brecel at the World Championship qualifiers. Patrick was to end the season on a high note, as in the final round of the third event of the 2013 Q School he edged out Ashley Carty 4–3 to regain his place on the main tour.

Patrick won just three matches during the 2013–14 season, all of them in the minor-ranking European Tour events, to end up ranked world number 119.

His 2014–15 season was much better as he started it by beating Jimmy White 5–2 to qualify for the 2014 Wuxi Classic. In Patrick's debut at a Chinese ranking event he lost 5–3 to Sam Baird. He whitewashed Stuart Bingham 4–0 at the minor-ranking Paul Hunter Classic and then defeated Matthew Stevens 4–3 and Jamie Jones 4–1 to reach the last 16, where Rod Lawler ended his run 4–0. Patrick won his first ever match at the venue stage of a ranking event by seeing off Jamie Burnett 6–4 at the UK Championship. He then knocked out world number 22 Ryan Day 6–4, during which he made a 139 break which went on to be the third highest of the event. In his second last 32 appearance at a ranking event he lost 6–3 to Judd Trump. Patrick qualified for the Indian Open, but lost 4–2 to Jamie Cope in the first round. Patrick could not get into the top 64 in the world rankings (he was 77th), but by finishing 40th on the European Order of Merit he earned himself a new two-year tour place.

Patrick began the 2015–16 season by whitewashing Michael Williams 5–0 and beating Tom Ford 5–1 to reach the third qualifying round of the Australian Goldfields Open, but lost 5–3 to David Morris. He was knocked out in the first round of the UK Championship 6–4 by Michael Holt. Patrick lost in a deciding frame to world number three Neil Robertson in the first round of the Welsh Open.

At the 2016 English Open, Patrick eliminated Zak Surety 4–1 and James Wattana 4–2 and then narrowly lost 4–3 to John Higgins in the third round. He reached the same stage of the Northern Ireland Open after only conceding one frame during wins over Marc Davis and Duane Jones, but he was thrashed 4–0 by Barry Hawkins. Patrick lost the final two frames both times in his 6–5 and 5–4 first round defeats to Michael White and Mark Joyce at the UK Championship and China Open respectively. He entered the 2017 Q School to try and stay on the tour as he has finished the season outside of the top 64 in the rankings at world number 105, but failed to advance beyond the third round of either event.

Patrick came through the second event of the 2019 Q School by winning six matches to earn a two-year card on the World Snooker Tour for the 2019–20 and 2020–21 seasons.

== Performance and rankings timeline ==
Tournament	2002/ 03	2003/ 04	2004/ 05	2007/ 08	2012/ 13	2013/ 14	2014/ 15	2015/ 16	2016/ 17	2017/ 18	2018/ 19	2019/ 20	2020/ 21	2021/ 22	2022/ 23
Ranking (Note: From the 2010/2011 season it shows the ranking at the beginning of the season)	(Note: He was an amateur)			(Note: New players on the Main Tour don't have a ranking)			119	(Note: Players qualified through European Tour Order of Merit started the season without prize money ranking points)	116			(Note: Players qualified through Q School started the season without ranking points)	92		84
Ranking tournaments
Championship League	Tournament Not Held			Non-Ranking Event									RR	RR	RR
European Masters (Note: The event was called the European Open (2002/2003–2003/2004) and Malta Cup (2004/2005 and 2007/2008))	A	A	A	NR	Tournament Not Held				LQ	A	A	LQ	2R	3R	LQ
British Open	A	A	A	Tournament Not Held										1R	1R
Northern Ireland Open	Tournament Not Held								3R	A	A	1R	1R	LQ	LQ
UK Championship	A	A	A	LQ	LQ	1R	3R	1R	1R	A	A	1R	1R	1R	LQ
Scottish Open (Note: The event was called the Players Championship (2003/2004))	A	A	Not Held		MR	Tournament Not Held			1R	A	1R	1R	1R	LQ	1R
English Open	Tournament Not Held								3R	A	A	WD	1R	3R	2R
World Grand Prix	Tournament Not Held						NR	DNQ	DNQ	DNQ	DNQ	DNQ	DNQ	DNQ	DNQ
Shoot Out	Tournament Not Held				Non-Ranking Event				2R	A	WD	2R	1R	1R	A
German Masters	Tournament Not Held				1R	LQ	LQ	A	LQ	A	A	LQ	WD	LQ	WD
Welsh Open	A	A	A	LQ	A	1R	1R	1R	1R	A	A	1R	1R	LQ	WD
Players Championship (Note: The event was called the Players Tour Championship Grand Finals (2010/2011–2012/2013))	Tournament Not Held				DNQ	DNQ	DNQ	DNQ	DNQ	DNQ	DNQ	DNQ	DNQ	DNQ	DNQ
WST Classic	Tournament Not Held														A
Tour Championship	Tournament Not Held										DNQ	DNQ	DNQ	DNQ	DNQ
World Championship	LQ	LQ	LQ	LQ	LQ	LQ	LQ	LQ	LQ	A	A	LQ	LQ	LQ	LQ
Non-ranking tournaments
The Masters	LQ	A	A	LQ	A	A	A	A	A	A	A	A	A	A	A
Six-red World Championship	Tournament Not Held				A	A	A	A	A	A	A	A	Not Held		LQ
Former ranking tournaments
Northern Ireland Trophy	Tournament Not Held			LQ	Tournament Not Held										
Wuxi Classic	Tournament Not Held				LQ	LQ	1R	Tournament Not Held							
Australian Goldfields Open	Tournament Not Held				LQ	A	LQ	LQ	Tournament Not Held						
Shanghai Masters	Tournament Not Held			LQ	LQ	LQ	LQ	LQ	LQ	A	Non-Ranking		Tournament Not Held		
Paul Hunter Classic	Tournament Not Held			Minor-Ranking Event					1R	LQ	A	NR	Tournament Not Held		
Indian Open	Tournament Not Held					LQ	1R	NH	WD	A	A	Tournament Not Held			
China Open	Not Held		A	LQ	LQ	LQ	LQ	LQ	1R	A	A	Tournament Not Held			
Riga Masters (Note: The event was called the Riga Open (2014/2015–2015/2016))	Tournament Not Held						Minor-Ranking		1R	A	A	LQ	Tournament Not Held		
International Championship	Tournament Not Held				LQ	LQ	LQ	LQ	LQ	A	A	LQ	Tournament Not Held		
China Championship	Tournament Not Held								NR	A	A	LQ	Tournament Not Held		
World Open (Note: The event was called the LG Cup (2002/2003–2003/2004) and the Grand Prix (2004/2005–2007/2008))	A	A	A	LQ	A	LQ	Not Held		LQ	A	A	LQ	Tournament Not Held		
WST Pro Series	Tournament Not Held												RR	Not Held	
Turkish Masters	Tournament Not Held													LQ	NH
Gibraltar Open	Tournament Not Held							MR	2R	A	A	WD	3R	WD	NH
Former non-ranking tournaments
Shoot Out	Tournament Not Held				A	A	2R	A	Ranking Event						

Performance Table Legend
LQ	lost in the qualifying draw	#R	lost in the early rounds of the tournament (WR = Wildcard round, RR = Round robin)	QF	lost in the quarter-finals
SF	lost in the semi-finals	F	lost in the final	W	won the tournament
DNQ	did not qualify for the tournament	A	did not participate in the tournament	WD	withdrew from the tournament

NH / Not Held	means an event was not held.
NR / Non-Ranking Event	means an event is/was no longer a ranking event.
R / Ranking Event	means an event is/was a ranking event.
MR / Minor-Ranking Event	means an event is/was a minor-ranking event.

== Career finals ==
=== Amateur finals: 3 (2 titles) ===
Outcome	No.	Year	Championship	Opponent in the final	Score
Winner	1.	2006	Scottish Amateur Championship	(Scotland) Robert Stephen	7–3
Runner-up	1.	2007	Scottish Amateur Championship	(Scotland) James McBain	7–6
Winner	2.	2018	Scottish Amateur Championship (2)	(Scotland) Ross Vallance	7–4
