= Jamie O'Neill (snooker player) =

English snooker player

Personal information
- Born: 19 August 1986 (age 40)

Sport
- Country: England
- Sport: Snooker
- Professional: 2007/2008, 2010/2011, 2012–2014, 2019–2023
- Highest ranking: 79
- Best ranking finish: Last 16 (x3)

Jamie O'Neill (born 19 August 1986) is an English former professional snooker player who lives in Wellingborough.

== Career ==
O'Neill began his professional career by playing Challenge Tour in 2003, at the time the second-level professional tour. He qualified for the 2007/2008 Main Tour by finishing 6th in the International Open Series Order of Merit. He won the sixth of eight events, beating Ashley Wright 6–2 in the final at Prestatyn. O'Neill has also won two significant amateur titles, the 2003 European Under-19 Championship and the 2006 English Open Championship. O'Neill reclaimed his place on the professional Main Tour by finishing sixth on the PIOS rankings.

In May 2019, O'Neill came through the first event of the 2019 Q School by winning five matches, to earn a two-year card on the World Snooker Tour for the 2019/2020 and 2020–21 seasons.

== Playing style ==
He practices at Barratts in Northampton where he has his own Riley Aristocrat table.

== Performance and rankings timeline ==
Tournament	2003/ 04	2004/ 05	2007/ 08	2010/ 11	2011/ 12	2012/ 13	2013/ 14	2014/ 15	2015/ 16	2017/ 18	2018/ 19	2019/ 20	2020/ 21	2021/ 22	2022/ 23	2023/ 24	2024/ 25	2026/ 27
Ranking (Note: From the 2010/2011 season it shows the ranking at the beginning of the season)	(Note: He was an amateur)		(Note: New players don't have a ranking)				93						86	(Note: Players qualified One Year Ranking List started the season without ranking points)	86			
Ranking tournaments
Championship League	Non-Ranking Event												2R	A	A	RR	RR	RR
China Open	NH	A	LQ	LQ	A	LQ	3R	A	A	A	A	Tournament Not Held						A
British Open	A	A	Tournament Not Held											A	LQ	A	A	
English Open	Tournament Not Held									A	A	1R	1R	LQ	LQ	A	A	
Northern Ireland Open	Tournament Not Held									A	A	2R	1R	WD	LQ	A	A	
International Championship	Tournament Not Held					LQ	LQ	A	A	A	A	LQ	Not Held			A	A	
UK Championship	A	A	LQ	LQ	A	LQ	2R	A	A	A	A	1R	1R	1R	LQ	A	A	
Scottish Open (Note: The event was called the Players Championship (2003/2004))	A	Tournament Not Held				MR	Not Held			A	A	1R	4R	LQ	LQ	A	A	
Shoot Out	Not Held			Non-Ranking Event						A	1R	1R	1R	1R	2R	2R	A	
German Masters	Not Held			LQ	A	LQ	1R	A	A	A	A	LQ	2R	LQ	LQ	A	A	
Welsh Open	A	A	LQ	LQ	A	LQ	1R	A	A	A	A	1R	2R	LQ	LQ	A	A	
World Grand Prix	Tournament Not Held							NR	DNQ	DNQ	DNQ	DNQ	DNQ	DNQ	DNQ	DNQ	DNQ	
Players Championship (Note: The event was called the Players Tour Championship Grand Final (2010/2011–2015/2016))	Not Held			DNQ	DNQ	DNQ	DNQ	DNQ	DNQ	DNQ	DNQ	DNQ	DNQ	DNQ	DNQ	DNQ	DNQ	
World Open (Note: The event was called the LG Cup (2003/2004) and the Grand Prix (2004/2005 and 2007/2008))	A	A	LQ	LQ	A	LQ	LQ	Not Held		A	A	LQ	Not Held			A	A	
Tour Championship	Tournament Not Held										DNQ	DNQ	DNQ	DNQ	DNQ	DNQ	DNQ	
World Championship	LQ	LQ	LQ	LQ	LQ	LQ	LQ	A	A	A	A	LQ	LQ	LQ	LQ	A	A	
Non-ranking tournaments
The Masters	A	A	LQ	A	A	A	A	A	A	A	A	A	A	A	A	A	A	
Former ranking tournaments
Northern Ireland Trophy	Not Held		LQ	Tournament Not Held														
Wuxi Classic	Not Held			Non-Rank		LQ	LQ	LQ	Tournament Not Held									
Australian Goldfields Open	Tournament Not Held				A	LQ	LQ	A	A	Tournament Not Held								
Shanghai Masters	Not Held		LQ	LQ	A	LQ	LQ	A	A	A	Non-Rank		Not Held			Non-Ranking		
Indian Open	Tournament Not Held						LQ	A	NH	A	A	Tournament Not Held						
Paul Hunter Classic (Note: The event was called the Grand Prix Fürth (2004/2005))	NH	Pro-Am		Minor-Ranking Event						WD	LQ	NR	Tournament Not Held					
China Championship	Tournament Not Held									A	A	LQ	Tournament Not Held					
WST Pro Series	Tournament Not Held												RR	Tournament Not Held				
Turkish Masters	Tournament Not Held													LQ	Tournament Not Held			
Gibraltar Open	Tournament Not Held								MR	2R	2R	2R	2R	WD	Tournament Not Held			
WST Classic	Tournament Not Held														1R	Not Held		
European Masters (Note: The event was called the European Open (2003/2004) and the Malta Cup (2004/2005 and 2007/2008))	A	A	NR	Tournament Not Held						A	A	LQ	1R	1R	A	A	Not Held	
Former non-ranking tournaments
Six-red World Championship	Not Held			A	NH	A	A	A	A	A	A	A	Not Held		LQ	Not Held		

Performance Table Legend
LQ	lost in the qualifying draw	#R	lost in the early rounds of the tournament (WR = Wildcard round, RR = Round robin)	QF	lost in the quarter-finals
SF	lost in the semi–finals	F	lost in the final	W	won the tournament
DNQ	did not qualify for the tournament	A	did not participate in the tournament	WD	withdrew from the tournament

NH / Not Held	means an event was not held.
NR / Non-Ranking Event	means an event is/was no longer a ranking event.
R / Ranking Event	means an event is/was a ranking event.
MR / Minor-Ranking Event	means an event is/was a minor-ranking event.

== Career finals ==
=== Amateur finals: 5 (3 titles) ===
Outcome	No.	Year	Championship	Opponent in the final	Score
Winner	1.	2003	European Under-19 Snooker Championships	(Scotland) Robert Shanks	6–3
Runner-up	1.	2006	PIOS – Event 8	(England) Andrew Higginson	3–6
Winner	2.	2006	English Open	(England) Jeff Cundy	8–3
Winner	3.	2007	PIOS – Event 6	(England) Ashley Wright	6–2
Runner-up	2.	2019	English Amateur Championship	(England) Brandon Sargeant	7–10
