= Alex Davies (snooker player) =

English snooker player

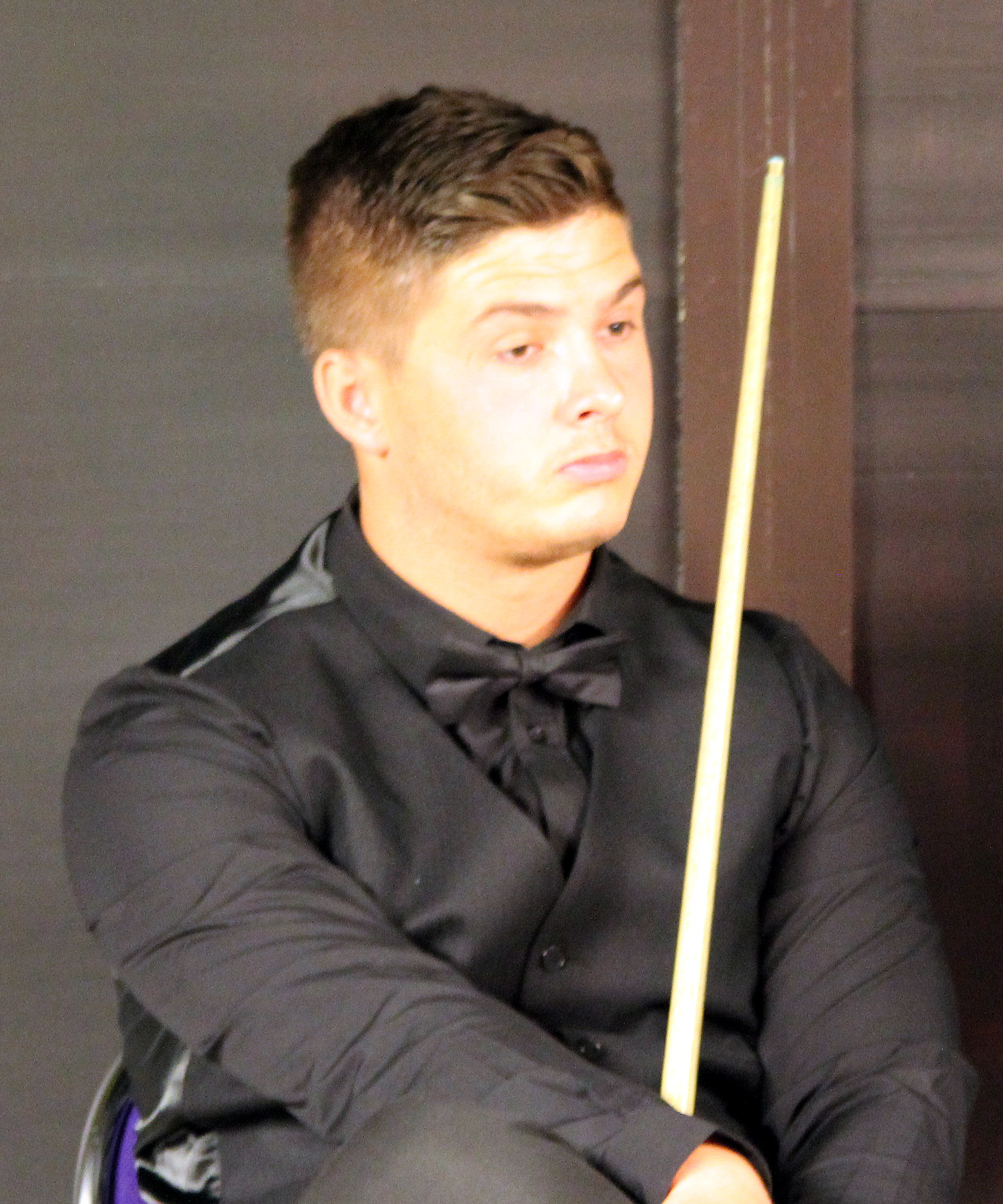
- Davies at the 2012 Paul Hunter Classic

Personal information
- Born: 27 July 1987 (age 39) Holland-on-Sea, Essex, England

Sport
- Country: England
- Sport: Snooker
- Professional: 2007/2008, 2013–2015
- Highest ranking: 74 (September–November 2014)

Alex Davies (born 27 July 1987) is an English former professional snooker player from Holland-on-Sea in Essex. He is the youngest person ever to win the English Amateur Championship, in 2003. Davies began his professional career by playing Challenge Tour in 2003, at the time the second-level professional tour. Davies was on the WPBSA Main Tour for the 2007–08 season, but dropped off. In May 2013, he returned to the main tour by winning five matches at the first event of the 2013 Q School concluding with a 4–1 win over Mitchell Travis to earn a place on the tour for the 2013–14 and 2014–15 season.

== Career ==
=== 2013/2014 season ===
Davies made a dream start to the season as in his first match he defeated world number four Shaun Murphy 5–1 to qualify for the 2013 Wuxi Classic in China where he lost 5–2 to Joel Walker in the first round. He also qualified for the Indian Open, International Championship and World Open, but lost in the first round of each. He finished his first year on the main snooker tour ranked world number 96.

=== 2014/2015 season ===
Davies recorded wins over Mitchell Mann, Peter Lines and Anthony McGill in the qualifying rounds of the Shanghai Masters, but was then beaten 5–2 by Liang Wenbo in the final round. He lost 6–4 to Aditya Mehta and 4–0 to Mark Selby in the opening round of the UK Championship and Welsh Open. Davies defeated Tom Ford 5–3 to reach the China Open, but was thrashed 5–0 by Zhao Xintong in the wildcard round. He could not pick up any wins on the European Tour until the last two events where a pair of last 32 exits saw him finish 72nd on the Order of Merit. Davies dropped off the tour at the end of the season as, at 76th in the world rankings, he is outside the top 64. Davies entered 2015 Q School in a bid to regain his place and came within two matches of doing so in the first event, but lost 4–1 to Leo Fernandez. In the second event, Davies was eliminated 4–1 by Duane Jones in the opening round.

=== Q School ===
Davies again entered Q School, but only won two matches across the two events to fall short of gaining a tour card. In the second event of 2017 Q School he stood one win away from regaining a spot back on the tour, but was beaten 4–2 by Duane Jones.

== Performance and rankings timeline ==
Tournament	2003/ 04	2004/ 05	2007/ 08	2010/ 11	2011/ 12	2012/ 13	2013/ 14	2014/ 15
Ranking (Note: From the 2010/2011 season it shows the ranking at the beginning of the season.)	(Note: He was an amateur.)		(Note: New players don't have a ranking.)					96
Ranking tournaments
Wuxi Classic	Tournament Not Held			Non-Ranking		A	1R	LQ
Australian Goldfields Open	Tournament Not Held				A	A	LQ	LQ
Shanghai Masters	Not Held		LQ	A	A	A	LQ	LQ
International Championship	Tournament Not Held					A	1R	LQ
UK Championship	A	A	LQ	A	A	A	1R	1R
German Masters	Tournament Not Held			A	A	A	LQ	LQ
Welsh Open	A	A	LQ	A	A	A	1R	1R
Indian Open	Tournament Not Held						1R	LQ
Players Championship Grand Final (Note: The event was called the Players Tour Championship Grand Finals (2010/2011–2012/2013))	Tournament Not Held			DNQ	DNQ	DNQ	DNQ	DNQ
China Open	NH	A	LQ	A	A	A	LQ	WR
World Championship	LQ	LQ	LQ	A	A	A	LQ	LQ
Non-ranking tournaments
The Masters	A	A	LQ	A	A	A	A	A
Former ranking tournaments
Northern Ireland Trophy	Not Held		LQ	Tournament Not Held				
World Open (Note: The event was called the LG Cup (2003/2004) and the Grand Prix (2004/2005–2007/2008))	A	A	LQ	A	A	A	1R	NH
Former non-ranking tournaments
Merseyside Professional Championship	A	1R	Tournament Not Held					
Masters Qualifying Event	A	A	1R	Tournament Not Held				

Performance Table Legend
LQ	lost in the qualifying draw	#R	lost in the early rounds of the tournament (WR = Wildcard round, RR = Round robin)	QF	lost in the quarter-finals
SF	lost in the semi-finals	F	lost in the final	W	won the tournament
DNQ	did not qualify for the tournament	A	did not participate in the tournament	WD	withdrew from the tournament

NH / Not Held	means an event was not held.
NR / Non-Ranking Event	means an event is/was no longer a ranking event.
R / Ranking Event	means an event is/was a ranking event.
MR / Minor-Ranking Event	means an event is/was a minor-ranking event.
