= Gareth Coppack =

Welsh snooker player

Personal information
- Born: 10 April 1980 (age 46)

Sport
- Country: Wales
- Sport: Snooker
- Professional: 2007/2008
- Highest ranking: 83 (2007/2008)

Gareth Coppack (born 10 April 1980 in Rhyl) is a Welsh former professional snooker player.

He competed on the main tour for one season, between 2007 and 2008, but lost his place at the end of that season.

== Career ==
Coppack first played competitive snooker in 2001, entering several Challenge Tour events and qualifying for the 2002 World Championship. He continued to play on both the Challenge Tour and the Pontin's International Open Series, which replaced it, until he earned a place on the professional main tour in 2007.

Coppack's first match as a professional was a 5–3 victory over James McBain in the Shanghai Masters, but he lost 1–5 in the next round to Judd Trump. In his qualifying group for the 2007 Grand Prix, he lost 0–4 to James Wattana, Tom Ford, McBain and Andrew Higginson and 1–4 to Jimmy Michie, but managed 4–1 wins over Tony Drago and Michael White; he did not qualify for the tournament itself.

At the 2008 World Championship, Coppack defeated Kurt Maflin 10–9 and Paul Davies 10–8 to record his first run to the last 64 at a ranking event. He was drawn against 1991 World Champion John Parrott and, after falling 0–8 behind, could not recover, losing 3–10.

Coppack was ranked 83rd at the end of the season, which was not sufficient for him to retain his place on the tour, and he was relegated immediately thereafter.
