= James McBain (snooker player) =

Scottish snooker player

Personal information
- Born: 22 June 1978 (age 48) Glasgow, Scotland

Sport
- Country: Scotland
- Sport: Snooker
- Professional: 1998/1999, 2000/2001, 2005/2006, 2007–2009, 2010/2011
- Highest ranking: 71 (2008/09)
- Best ranking finish: Last 32 (x1)

James McBain (born 22 June 1978) is a Scottish former professional snooker player. After five years on snooker's secondary tour, James progressed it to the Main tour for the 2005–06 snooker season. McBain finished third in the Pontin's International Open Series Order of Merit, winning the last of eight events to clinch his promotion to the main tour again for the 2007–08 season, but was relegated in 2009. In 2010 he won the play-off match, which determined who would qualify for the 2010/2011 professional Main Tour. In 2010/2011 he had wins against Stuart Bingham, Anthony Hamilton, Mark Allen and Gerard Greene, but just fell short of retaining his Tour place, finishing 75th in the rankings.

== Tournament wins ==
=== Non-Ranking Wins (1) ===
- Challenge Tour - Event 3 - 2005

=== Amateur ===
- Scottish Amateur Championship - 2003, 2007
- PIOS – Event 8 - 2007
