= 2010–11 snooker world ranking points =

Preceded by 2009/2010	2010/2011	Succeeded by 2011/2012

Snooker world ranking points 2010/2011: The official world ranking points for the 97 professional snooker players in the 2010–11 season are listed below. The total points from the 2008/2009 and 2009/2010 seasons were used to determine the rankings at the start of 2010/2011 season. The rankings set the official seedings at the start of the season and at three further points during the season. The total points accumulated by the cut-off dates for the revised seedings were based on all the points from the current season, all of the points from the 2009/2010 season, and the points that were still valid from the 2008/2009 season. The total points from the 2009/2010 and 2010/2011 seasons were used to determine the seedings at the start of the 2011/2012 season.

The first seedings update took place on 4 October 2010, after the Brugge Open, and points accumulated from the Northern Ireland Trophy, Shanghai Masters and Grand Prix during the 2008/2009 season were dropped. The seedings were next updated on 13 December 2010, after the UK Championship; the points accumulated from the Bahrain Championship and UK Championship during the 2008/2009 season were dropped. The final update occurred on 21 February 2011, after the Welsh Open, and the points accumulated from the Welsh Open during the 2008/2009 season were dropped.

== Seeding revisions ==
Cut-off point	Date	After	2008/2009 points dropped
1	4 October 2010	Brugge Open	Northern Ireland Trophy, Shanghai Masters, Grand Prix
2	13 December 2010	UK Championship	Bahrain Championship, UK Championship
3	21 February 2011	Welsh Open	Welsh Open
4	3 May 2011	World Championship	China Open, World Championship

== Ranking points ==
No.	Ch	Player	Season		Tournaments								Season	Cut-off points (Note: See for the rankings at the first seedings cut-off point; see for the second, see for the third.)			Total
No.	Ch	Player	08/09 (Note: The 2008/2009 points only include the points from that season that counted towards the last ranking update.)	09/10	PTC	SM	WOO	UK	GM	WEO	CO	WC	10/11	1	2	3	Total
1	▲7	(Wales) Mark Williams	0	23480	8460	2660	4480	6400	5000	2500	980	6400	36880	45000	48755	55680	60360
2	▼1	(Scotland) John Higgins (Note: John Higgins was banned from all WSA tournaments from 2 May 2010 until 2 November 2010.)	0	26820	3600			8000	1900	5000	3500	10000	32000	46470	54320	59320	58820
3	▲6	(England) Mark Selby	0	17520	12320	4480	805	3040	4000	3200	5600	5000	38445	38775	45645	50345	55965
4	▲1	(China) Ding Junhui	0	27200	3680	2660	3500	3040	2500	2500	4480	6400	28760	43370	46480	49580	55960
5	▼3	(Australia) Neil Robertson	0	25580	3880	980	7000	4000	700	1900	2660	1400	22520	54190	52940	52340	48100
6	▼2	(England) Ali Carter	0	22520	2040	7000	1960	1120	1900	3200	3500	3800	24520	48600	45340	45440	47040
7	Steady	(England) Shaun Murphy	0	15180	12320	2660	805	5120	1900	700	4480	3800	31785	43845	46085	46185	46965
8	▼2	(Scotland) Stephen Maguire	0	18420	7840	2660	3500	4000	2500	4000	980	1400	26880	44160	43780	47780	45300
9	▲18	(England) Judd Trump	0	8360	9420	1960	1960	3040	1400	575	7000	8000	33355	25330	27750	29275	41715
10	▲3	(Scotland) Graeme Dott	0	16865	5040	3500	805	3040	3200	2500	980	5000	24065	34000	37450	41250	40930
11	▼8	(England) Ronnie O'Sullivan	0	23960	2600	0	5600	1120	700	700	980	5000	16700	43910	41480	40980	40660
12	▼2	(Northern Ireland) Mark Allen	0	17580	4240	980	805	5120	700	1900	980	5000	19725	33935	36525	38425	37305
13	▲5	(England) Peter Ebdon	0	13120	6400	2660	4480	1120	1900	1900	3500	1400	23360	33110	34880	37980	36480
14	▲11	(Wales) Matthew Stevens	0	10715	9320	3500	1960	2240	1400	2500	1960	2800	25680	29750	28940	31440	36395
15	▲2	(England) Jamie Cope	0	14220	5720	4480	2660	1120	700	1900	980	3800	21360	32178	33975	36000	35580
16	▼5	(Scotland) Stephen Hendry	0	17560	920	980	2660	3040	1900	1900	2660	3800	17860	34570	33360	36460	35420
17	▲12	(England) Stuart Bingham	0	11015	9060	2660	805	4000	575	1400	1960	3800	24260	25610	30350	31750	35275
18	▲5	(England) Stephen Lee	0	9985	9300	1960	2660	2240	1400	575	3500	2800	24435	28590	29420	30820	34420
19	▲7	(England) Mark Davis	0	13270	7700	3500	1960	2240	575	575	2660	1150	20360	29160	29980	30805	33630
20	Steady	(England) Ricky Walden	0	10230	8860	1960	3500	2240	1900	700	2660	1400	23220	26855	31500	32950	33450
21	▲22	(England) Martin Gould	0	7840	9800	2660	3500	2240	575	575	1960	3800	25110	25800	29240	28490	32950
22	▼1	(England) Barry Hawkins	0	11045	6640	805	2660	2240	575	1400	1960	3800	20080	26500	27340	28740	31125
23	▼9	(Hong Kong) Marco Fu	0	10360	7800	980	1960	3040	3200	1400	980	1400	20760	31480	30300	32400	31120
24	▲16	(Scotland) Marcus Campbell	0	9470	9300	630	2660	720	575	1400	2660	2800	20745	21025	23780	24605	30215
25	▲7	(England) Andrew Higginson	0	9190	7940	2660	2660	3040	1400	575	805	1150	20230	24260	28750	30275	29420
26	▼11	(England) Mark King	0	14460	3120	3500	805	1120	700	1900	805	2800	14750	31755	30605	31305	29210
27	▼8	(England) Joe Perry	0	12760	4800	805	805	920	2500	1400	1960	2800	15990	25220	22890	26090	28750
28	▼16	(Wales) Ryan Day	0	12160	2440	980	805	3040	1400	1900	2660	2800	16025	26355	28325	30925	28185
29	▲1	(Republic of Ireland) Ken Doherty	0	13560	4080	1960	1960	2240	575	575	1960	1150	14500	22940	26100	26675	28060
30	▼14	(China) Liang Wenbo	0	15740	6400	980	805	920	575	575	805	1150	12210	26560	28405	28405	27950
31	▲14	(Wales) Dominic Dale	0	7990	8740	630	1610	1840	1900	1400	805	2800	19725	19838	22795	24695	27715
32	▼4	(Northern Ireland) Gerard Greene	0	11495	7320	805	805	920	575	1400	1960	1150	14935	24435	25855	26680	26430
33	▲3	(England) Robert Milkins	0	11260	3160	1960	630	1840	1400	450	2660	2300	14400	21930	21800	22750	25660
34	▲7	(England) Tom Ford	0	9765	7200	1610	630	2240	575	575	1610	900	15340	21350	24505	24505	25105
35	▼1	(England) Rory McLeod	0	8910	4480	630	1610	2240	325	1400	1610	3800	16095	20300	21570	22845	25005
36	▲6	(England) Anthony Hamilton	0	7160	6820	1610	630	720	1900	1150	1610	2300	16740	19908	21550	21400	23900
37	▲10	(Republic of Ireland) Fergal O'Brien	0	8690	4360	1610	1960	1840	325	450	1610	2300	14455	20728	22410	21785	23145
38	▼5	(England) Mike Dunn	0	9190	3280	1960	1960	920	900	450	1610	2300	13380	22175	22160	22110	22570
39	▼2	(Scotland) Jamie Burnett	0	7250	720	5600	630	1840	900	1400	630	2800	14520	21740	21390	22290	21770
40	▼2	(England) Nigel Bond	0	9225	3480	630	1960	720	1400	1400	1960	900	12450	21068	21790	24015	21675
41	▲16	(England) Barry Pinches	0	7845	8380	1260	630	720	325	450	1260	650	13675	19658	20070	19445	21520
42	▲16	(England) Mark Joyce	0	7740	4600	455	630	4000	900	450	1610	900	13545	14288	19300	19750	21285
43	▲8	(England) Matthew Selt	0	8470	4240	455	1610	1440	1150	900	630	2300	12725	17285	18365	19765	21195
44	▼22	(England) Steve Davis	0	10230	2640	1960	805	920	1150	450	630	2300	10855	22770	21330	21530	21085
45	▼21	(England) Michael Holt	0	9185	4780	805	805	720	325	1400	630	2300	11765	20705	20145	20720	20950
46	▲8	(Malta) Tony Drago	0	9120	3680	1260	1610	1440	1150	1150	630	900	11820	17327	19304	20873	20940
47	New entry	(Wales) Jamie Jones	0	5040	6560	1610	1610	1440	900	900	455	1800	15275	13957	17614	18683	20315
48	▼17	(England) Dave Harold	0	5885	3280	1960	1960	720	1150	1900	630	2800	14400	19078	18255	19905	20285
49	▲22	(England) Joe Jogia	0	5700	6200	910	1960	520	325	1150	1260	1800	14125	14307	16644	17388	19825
50	Steady	(England) Peter Lines	0	8300	5480	1260	630	1840	325	450	630	900	11515	17915	20110	20235	19815
51	▼5	(Scotland) Alan McManus	0	7040	4200	630	2660	720	1150	450	630	2300	12740	18105	18450	19600	19780
52	New entry	(England) Jack Lisowski	0	5040	6960	280	1260	1040	1400	1400	455	1800	14595	13557	15934	18003	19635
53	▲10	(England) Jimmy Robertson	0	6540	5320	455	630	520	1150	900	455	2800	12230	14362	15659	16978	18770
54	▼15	(Northern Ireland) Joe Swail	0	6215	2200	1610	630	1840	2500	1150	1610	650	12190	19785	19870	19520	18405
55	▲5	(England) Jimmy White	0	4870	4560	455	1960	2240	900	1150	1610	650	13525	14340	16985	17635	18395
56	▼12	(England) Adrian Gunnell	0	9420	3680	630	1610	720	900	325	455	650	8970	18035	17860	18635	18390
57	New entry	(England) Alfie Burden	0	5040	5400	1610	1610	520	900	900	1610	650	13200	15677	16374	17443	18240
58	▼9	(England) Rod Lawler	0	7975	1640	1610	630	1840	325	1400	1610	650	9705	16188	17220	18620	17680
59	New entry	(Scotland) Anthony McGill	0	5040	6760	910	1610	520	1400	325	455	650	12630	14817	17034	18028	17670
60	New entry	(China) Liu Chuang	0	5040	5240	280	455	1840	325	900	910	2300	12250	11272	15049	15543	17290
61	▼8	(England) Andy Hicks	0	5160	5040	1610	1610	520	900	1150	455	650	11935	17545	17790	18690	17095
62	▲15	(China) Liu Song (Note: Liu Song received a wildcard to compete on the Main Tour for the duration of John Higgins' ban. Liu was not eligible to receive ranking points for the first two events of the Players Tour Championship since they were contested before he received the wildcard for the Main Tour. After Higgins had served his ban and returned to professional competition, Liu's place on the tour was withdrawn and he was not eligible to receive ranking points for the final two events of the Euro Players Tour Championship. Following Patrick Einsle's resignation from the Main Tour on 10 December 2010, Liu received another wildcard to compete on the tour.)	0	4740	3560	910	2660		1400	200	1260	2300	12290	13293	14320	15595	17030
63	▼15	(England) Ian McCulloch	0	7390	3840	1610	630	520	650	1150	455	650	9505	16165	16290	17515	16895
64	▲10	(China) Xiao Guodong	0	4790	3840	910	1260	1840	900	900	910	1300	11860	12097	14834	15903	16650
65	▼3	(Belgium) Bjorn Haneveer	0	6800	4680	455	1610	520	325	325	1260	650	9825	15762	16259	16178	16625
66	▲1	(Wales) Michael White	0	5520	3440	1610	455	1440	325	650	910	1800	10630	12922	14659	14903	16150
67	▼1	(Thailand) James Wattana	0	6010	1280	1260	1610	1840	325	200	1610	1800	9925	13257	14194	13988	15935
68	New entry	(England) Liam Highfield	0	5040	4760	1260	1260	1040	325	650	910	400	10605	13417	15554	15798	15645
69	▲4	(England) Ben Woollaston	0	5040	3720	280	1610	1040	325	650	1610	1300	10535	12067	13884	14128	15575
70	▼2	(England) Matthew Couch	0	5070	2720	1260	1960	1440	900	200	1260	650	10390	15400	15150	16050	15460
71	New entry	(Wales) Andrew Pagett	0	5040	4880	280	455	1040	325	200	280	2800	10260	12112	13889	13683	15300
72	New entry	(England) Kyren Wilson	0	5040	2560	910	1260	1440	900	200	910	1800	9980	12147	13404	13773	15020
73	New entry	(England) Paul Davison	0	5040	3400	280	1610	320	325	1150	910	1800	9795	11707	12844	13588	14835
74	▼5	(Northern Ireland) Patrick Wallace	0	5870	1720	910	1260	2240	325	325	280	1800	8860	13535	15600	15600	14730
75	New entry	(Scotland) James McBain	0	5040	2040	1260	1960	320	325	650	1260	1800	9615	12477	12814	13058	14655
76	▼21	(England) David Gilbert	0	6550	360	455	630	1840	900	200	1260	2300	7945	12010	13085	12285	14495
77	▼42	(England) Stuart Pettman	0	7540	920	630	1610	720	325	325	455	1800	6785	19100	17570	17070	14325
78	▼19	(Republic of Ireland) David Morris	0	6240	1640	1260	1960	520	325	900	280	400	7285	15905	14645	14970	13525
79	▼13	(England) Simon Bedford	0	5740	920	280	1610	1440	1150	650	280	1300	7630	10780	12640	14240	13370
80	New entry	(Brazil) Igor Figueiredo	0	5040	3480	1260	1610	320	325	650	280	400	8325	13967	13904	14148	13365
81	▼20	(Republic of Ireland) Joe Delaney	0	5735	720	1960	630	320	900	200	1260	1300	7290	13975	12390	12590	13025
82	New entry	(Thailand) Thanawat Thirapongpaiboon	0	5040	1280	1610	1610	320	1400	200	280	400	7100	11917	12054	12923	12140
83	▼27	(England) Jimmy Michie	0	6480	2400	455	1960	520	325	0			5660	15350	14315	14190	12140
84	▼14	(China) Zhang Anda	0	5840	1840	1610	455	320	325	200	910	400	6060	11922	12259	12053	11900
85	New entry	(Norway) Kurt Maflin	0	5040	2000	280	455	320	325	650	1960	400	6390	10512	10289	10533	11430
86	New entry	(England) Kuldesh Johal	0	5040	1280	280	1260	320	325	650	910	1300	6325	10797	10374	10618	11365
87	New entry	(Thailand) Issara Kachaiwong	0	5040	2560	280	455	320	325	200	1610	400	6150	9792	10849	10643	11190
88	New entry	(England) Adam Wicheard	0	5040	2200	280	455	1040	900	200	280	400	5755	10352	11209	11578	10795
89	▼37	(Republic of Ireland) Michael Judge	0	7010	720	455	630	520	0	650	280	400	3655	14843	12960	11710	10665
90	New entry	(England) Justin Astley	0	5040	2200	280	1260	320	325	200	280	400	5265	11517	11294	11088	10305
91	New entry	(Northern Ireland) Dermot McGlinchey	0	5040	1440	280	1260	320	325	200	280	400	4505	10957	10534	10328	9545
92	New entry	(Thailand) Noppon Saengkham	0	5040	720	280	1260	320	325	900	280	400	4485	10237	9814	10308	9525
93	New entry	(England) Jamie O'Neill	0	5040	1080	280	455	320	900	650	280	400	4365	10152	9369	10188	9405
94	New entry	(Wales) Jak Jones	0	5040	1480	280	455	320	325	650	280	400	4190	9992	9769	10013	9230
95	New entry	(Germany) Patrick Einsle (Note: Patrick Einsle resigned his place on the Main Tour on 10 December 2010.)	0	5040	1640	910	455	320					3325	10982	10559	9828	8365
96	▼32	(Wales) Paul Davies	0	4815	0	455	1610	1040		0			3105	12543	11945	10545	7920
97	New entry	(England) Reanne Evans	0	5040	0	280	455	320	325	200	280	400	2260	9432	8289	8083	7300

Player did not enter tournament.

== Sources ==
- "Tour Provisional Ranking Points Schedule – 2010/2011 season". worldsnooker.com. World Professional Billiards and Snooker Association. Archived from the original (DOC) on 6 June 2012.
