= 2013–14 snooker season =

Series of snooker tournaments

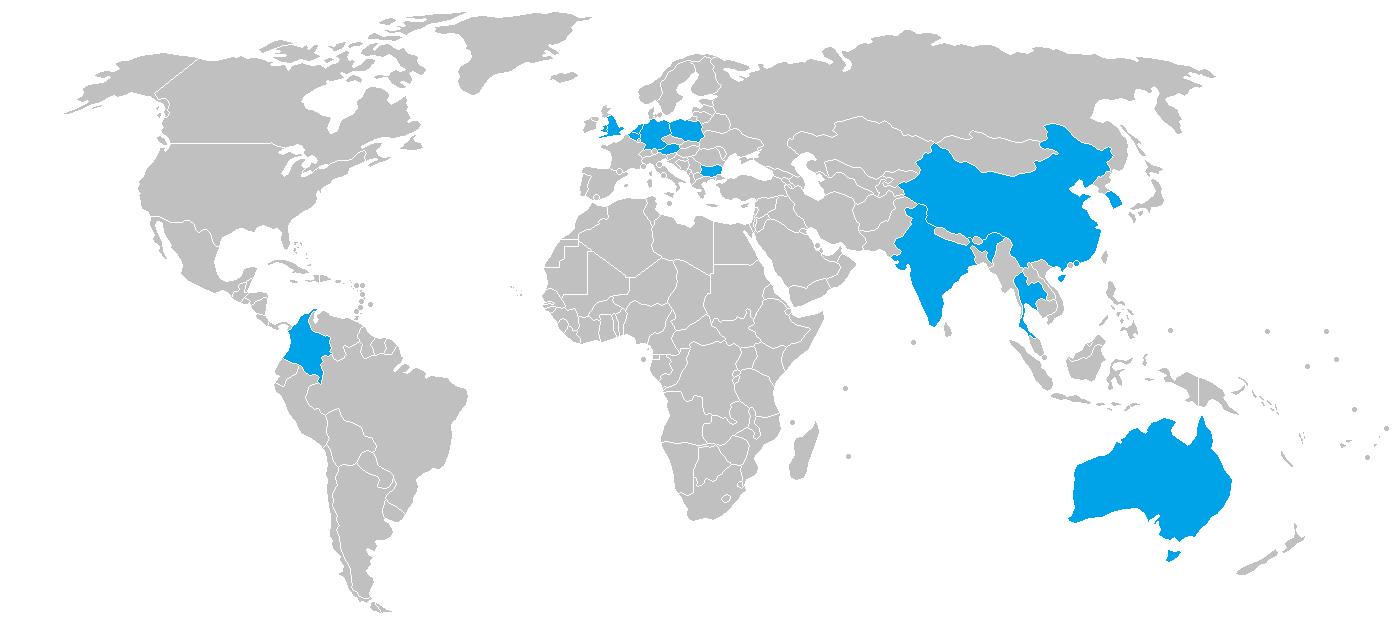
- Nations that hosted an event in the snooker calendar during the 2013–14 season

Details
- Duration: 6 June 2013 – 5 May 2014
- Tournaments: 35 (Note: The three disciplines at the 2013 Asian Indoor and Martial Arts Games were part of the same tournament.) (12 ranking events)

Triple Crown winners
- UK Championship: Neil Robertson (AUS)
- Masters: Ronnie O'Sullivan (ENG)
- World Championship: Mark Selby (ENG)

The 2013–14 snooker season was a series of snooker tournaments played between 6 June 2013 and 5 May 2014. From this season every qualifying match was held open to the public at various venues in the United Kingdom, replacing the World Snooker Academy in Sheffield. The number of wild-card players at the Chinese ranking events, except the Shanghai Masters, was reduced from eight to four and former Main Tour players were excluded. A professional player could not be selected for more than one wild-card match during the season.

In all but three tournaments, every player participated in round one featuring 64 seeds for the first time in the history of snooker. In nine of the ranking tournaments all players took part in the first round, with the winners travelling to the final venue. At three events, the UK Championship, the Welsh Open and the PTC Finals, all matches were held at the final venue. The only three events using the old system were the Australian Goldfields Open, the Shanghai Masters and the World Championship. If a seeded player lost his first-round match in these events, then only half of the prize money counted to his official ranking. This was used in all tournaments following the 2012 World Championship.

The season had a total of at least £8 million of prize money. The World Championship, the UK Championship, the International Championship and the Masters were the four biggest tournaments in terms of prize money with the total pot being at least £600,000 at each event. The Indian Open became the first ranking event held in India, and the Champion of Champions was held again after 1980 replacing the Premier League Snooker. At the end of the season Ronnie O'Sullivan was named the World Snooker Player of the Year and the Fans Player of the Year, Ding Junhui the Snooker Writers Player of the Year and John Astley the Rookie of the Year. Mark Selby received the "Performance of the Year" and "The Magic Moment of the Year" awards for winning his first World title and compiling the 100th maximum break in the history of snooker. Dennis Taylor and Cliff Thorburn were inducted into the Hall of Fame.

Neil Robertson became the first player in the history of snooker to compile one hundred century breaks in a season. Ding Junhui equalled Stephen Hendry's then record of winning five major ranking titles in a season by claiming the Shanghai Masters, the Indian Open, the International Championship, the German Masters and the China Open.

== New professional players ==
Countries:

- Australia
- Brazil
- China
- England
- Finland
- Germany
- Ireland
- Libya
- Malta
- Northern Ireland
- Qatar
- Scotland
- Switzerland
- Thailand
- Wales

The 2013/2014 season was made up of 132 professional players. The top 64 players after the 2013 World Championship and the 32 players earning a two-year card the previous year, who hadn't already earned a place, automatically qualified for the 2013/2014 season, as have eight players from the PTC Order of Merit of the Players Tour Championship and four players from the APTC Order of Merit, who have not already qualified for the Main Tour. Another three players came from the EBSA Qualifying Tour Play-Offs, and a further twelve places were available through the 2013 Q School. The rest of the places on to the tour came from amateur events and national governing body nominations. All players listed below received a tour card for two seasons.

International champions:

1. IBSF World Under-21 Snooker Championship winner: Lyu Haotian (CHN)
2. EBSA European Snooker Championships winner: Robin Hull (FIN)
3. EBSA European Under-21 Snooker Championships winner: James Cahill (ENG)
4. ACBS Asian Under-21 Snooker Championship winner: Noppon Saengkham (THA)
5. ABSF African Snooker Championship runner-up: Khaled Belaid Abumdas (LBY)

NGB nominations

6. IBSF nomination: Alex Borg (MLT)
7. ACBS nomination: Ratchayothin Yotharuck (THA)
8. American nomination: Igor Figueiredo (BRA)
9. Oceania nomination: Vinnie Calabrese (AUS)

PTC Order of Merit

10. Joe Swail (NIR)
11. Andrew Pagett (WAL)
12. Gary Wilson (ENG)
13. Andrew Norman (ENG)
14. John Astley (ENG)
15. Allan Taylor (ENG)
16. Kyren Wilson (ENG)
17. Chris Norbury (ENG)

EBSA Qualifying Tour Play-Offs

18. Patrick Einsle (GER)
19. Jak Jones (WAL)
20. Stuart Carrington (ENG)

APTC Order of Merit

21. Li Hang (CHN)
22. Jin Long (CHN)
23. Shi Hanqing (CHN)
24. Cao Xinlong (CHN)

Q School
Event 1

25. Elliot Slessor (ENG)
26. Alex Davies (ENG)
27. Lee Page (ENG)
28. Hammad Miah (ENG)

Event 2

29. Ahmed Saif (QAT)
30. Ross Muir (SCO)
31. Ryan Clark (ENG)
32. Alexander Ursenbacher (SUI)

Event 3

33. David Morris (IRL)
34. Lee Spick (ENG)
35. Chris Wakelin (ENG)
36. Fraser Patrick (SCO)

== Calendar ==
The following table outlines the results and dates for all the ranking and major invitational events.

=== World Snooker Tour ===
Start	Finish	Tournament	Venue	Winner	Score	Runner-up	Ref.
6 Jun	9 Jun	European Tour – Event 1 (Note: Event also known as the 2013 Bulgarian Open.)‡	Universiada Hall in Sofia, Bulgaria	John Higgins (SCO)	4‍–‍1	Neil Robertson (AUS)	
11 Jun	15 Jun	Asian Tour – Event 1 (Note: Event also known as the 2013 Yixing Open.)‡	Yixing Sports Centre in Yixing, China	Joe Perry (ENG)	4‍–‍1	Mark Selby (ENG)	
17 Jun	23 Jun	Wuxi Classic	Wuxi City Sports Park Stadium in Wuxi, China	Neil Robertson (AUS)	10‍–‍7	John Higgins (SCO)	
8 Jul	14 Jul	Australian Goldfields Open	Bendigo Stadium in Bendigo, Australia	Marco Fu (HKG)	9‍–‍6	Neil Robertson (AUS)	
18 Jul	21 Jul	European Tour – Event 2 (Note: Event also known as the 2013 Rotterdam Open.)‡	Topsport Centrum in Rotterdam, Netherlands	Mark Williams (WAL)	4‍–‍3	Mark Selby (ENG)	
14 Aug	17 Aug	European Tour – Event 3 (Note: Event also known as the 2013 Bluebell Wood Open.)‡	Doncaster Dome in Doncaster, England	Ricky Walden (ENG)	4‍–‍3	Marco Fu (HKG)	
22 Aug	25 Aug	European Tour – Event 4 (Note: Event also known as the 2013 Paul Hunter Classic.)‡	Stadthalle in Fürth, Germany	Ronnie O'Sullivan (ENG)	4‍–‍0	Gerard Greene (NIR)	
2 Sep	7 Sep	Six-red World Championship†	Montien Riverside Hotel in Bangkok, Thailand	Mark Davis (ENG)	8‍–‍4	Neil Robertson (AUS)	
16 Sep	22 Sep	Shanghai Masters	Shanghai Grand Stage in Shanghai, China	Ding Junhui (CHN)	10‍–‍6	Xiao Guodong (CHN)	
23 Sep	27 Sep	Asian Tour – Event 2 (Note: Event also known as the 2013 Zhangjiagang Open.)‡	Zhangjiagang Sports Center in Zhangjiagang, China	Ju Reti (CHN)	4‍–‍1	Michael Holt (ENG)	
3 Oct	6 Oct	European Tour – Event 5 (Note: Event also known as the 2013 Ruhr Open.)‡	RWE-Sporthalle in Mülheim, Germany	Mark Allen (NIR)	4‍–‍1	Ding Junhui (CHN)	
14 Oct	18 Oct	Indian Open	Le Meridien Hotel in New Delhi, India	Ding Junhui (CHN)	5‍–‍0	Aditya Mehta (IND)	
20 Oct	24 Oct	Asian Tour – Event 3 (Note: Event also known as the 2013 Zhengzhou Open.)‡	Guanhua Grand Hotel in Zhengzhou, China	Liang Wenbo (CHN)	4‍–‍0	Lyu Haotian (CHN)	
27 Oct	3 Nov	International Championship	Chengdu Eastern Music Park in Chengdu, China	Ding Junhui (CHN)	10‍–‍9	Marco Fu (HKG)	
7 Nov	10 Nov	European Tour – Event 6 (Note: Event also known as the 2013 Kay Suzanne Memorial Cup.)‡	The Capital Venue in Gloucester, England	Mark Allen (NIR)	4‍–‍1	Judd Trump (ENG)	
14 Nov	17 Nov	European Tour – Event 7 (Note: Event also known as the 2013 Antwerp Open.)‡	Lotto Arena in Antwerp, Belgium	Mark Selby (ENG)	4‍–‍3	Ronnie O'Sullivan (ENG)	
19 Nov	24 Nov	Champion of Champions†	Ricoh Arena in Coventry, England	Ronnie O'Sullivan (ENG)	10‍–‍8	Stuart Bingham (ENG)	
26 Nov	8 Dec	UK Championship	Barbican Centre in York, England	Neil Robertson (AUS)	10‍–‍7	Mark Selby (ENG)	
12 Jan	19 Jan	Masters†	Alexandra Palace in London, England	Ronnie O'Sullivan (ENG)	10‍–‍4	Mark Selby (ENG)	
24 Jan	26 Jan	Snooker Shoot Out†	Circus Arena in Blackpool, England	Dominic Dale (WAL)	1‍–‍0	Stuart Bingham (ENG)	
29 Jan	2 Feb	German Masters	Tempodrom in Berlin, Germany	Ding Junhui (CHN)	9‍–‍5	Judd Trump (ENG)	
6 Feb	9 Feb	European Tour – Event 8 (Note: Event also known as the 2014 Gdynia Open.)‡	Gdynia Sports Arena in Gdynia, Poland	Shaun Murphy (ENG)	4‍–‍1	Fergal O'Brien (IRL)	
19 Feb	2 Mar	Welsh Open	Newport Centre in Newport, Wales	Ronnie O'Sullivan (ENG)	9‍–‍3	Ding Junhui (CHN)	
6 Jan	6 Mar	Championship League†	Crondon Park Golf Club in Stock, England	Judd Trump (ENG)	3‍–‍1	Martin Gould (ENG)	
4 Mar	8 Mar	Asian Tour – Event 4 (Note: Event also known as the 2014 Dongguan Open.)‡	Dongguan Dongcheng Sports Garden in Dongguan, China	Stuart Bingham (ENG)	4‍–‍1	Liang Wenbo (CHN)	
10 Mar	16 Mar	World Open	Hainan International Exhibition Center in Haikou, China	Shaun Murphy (ENG)	10‍–‍6	Mark Selby (ENG)	
25 Mar	29 Mar	Players Tour Championship Finals (Note: Event also known as the 2014 Players Championship Grand Final.)	Guild Hall in Preston, England	Barry Hawkins (ENG)	4‍–‍0	Gerard Greene (NIR)	
31 Mar	6 Apr	China Open	Beijing University Students' Gymnasium in Beijing, China	Ding Junhui (CHN)	10‍–‍5	Neil Robertson (AUS)	
19 Apr	5 May	World Snooker Championship	Crucible Theatre in Sheffield, England	Mark Selby (ENG)	18‍–‍14	Ronnie O'Sullivan (ENG)	

Ranking event
‡ Minor-ranking event
† Non-ranking event

=== World Ladies Billiards and Snooker Association ===
Start	Finish	Tournament	Venue	Winner	Score	Runner-up	Ref.
8 Sep		Women's British Open	Whitley Bay Snooker Centre in Whitley Bay, England	Reanne Evans (ENG)	4‍–‍1	Hannah Jones (ENG)	
2 Nov		UK Ladies Championship	North East Derbyshire Snooker Centre in Chesterfield, England	Ng On-yee (HKG)	4‍–‍2	Maria Catalano (ENG)	
16 Nov	17 Nov	Eden Masters	Cambridge Snooker Centre in Cambridge, England	Reanne Evans (ENG)	5‍–‍0	Maria Catalano (ENG)	
23 Feb		Southern Classic	Jesters Snooker in Swindon, England	Ng On-yee (HKG)	4‍–‍1	Maria Catalano (ENG)	
30 Mar		Connie Gough Memorial	Dunstable Snooker Club in Dunstable, England	Reanne Evans (ENG)	4‍–‍0	Maria Catalano (ENG)	
18 Apr	22 Apr	World Ladies Championship	Northern Snooker Centre in Leeds, England	Reanne Evans (ENG)	6‍–‍0	Ng On-yee (HKG)	

=== Seniors events ===
Start	Finish	Tournament	Venue	Winner	Score	Runner-up	Ref.
19 Oct	20 Oct	World Seniors Championship	Mountbatten Centre in Portsmouth, England	Steve Davis (ENG)	2‍–‍1	Nigel Bond (ENG)	

=== Other events ===
Start	Finish	Tournament	Venue	Winner	Score	Runner-up	Ref.
26 Jun	30 Jun	Pink Ribbon	The Capital Venue in Gloucester, England	Joe Perry (ENG)	4‍–‍3	Barry Hawkins (ENG)	
29 Jun	1 Jul	Asian Indoor and Martial Arts Games – Six-red	Songdo Convensia in Incheon, South Korea	Xiao Guodong (CHN)	5‍–‍4	Amir Sarkhosh (IRI)	
1 Jul	2 Jul	Asian Indoor and Martial Arts Games – Team	Songdo Convensia in Incheon, South Korea	China	3‍–‍2	Independent Olympic Athletes	
3 Jul	6 Jul	Asian Indoor and Martial Arts Games – Singles	Songdo Convensia in Incheon, South Korea	Cao Yupeng (CHN)	4‍–‍2	Ding Junhui (CHN)	
4 Jul	7 Jul	Vienna Snooker Open	Brut Theatre in Vienna, Austria	Mark King (ENG)	5‍–‍0	Craig Steadman (ENG)	
26 Jul	30 Jul	World Games	Unidad Deportiva Alberto Galindo in Cali, Colombia	Aditya Mehta (IND)	3‍–‍0	Liang Wenbo (CHN)	
9 Sep	13 Sep	General Cup	General Snooker Club in Hong Kong, China	Mark Davis (ENG)	7‍–‍2	Neil Robertson (AUS)	

== Official rankings ==
=== Seeding revision 1 ===
No.	Ch.	Name	Points
1	Steady	Mark Selby (ENG)	79740
2	Steady	Neil Robertson (AUS)	79460
3	Steady	Judd Trump (ENG)	76720
4	Steady	Shaun Murphy (ENG)	68220
5	Steady	Stephen Maguire (SCO)	66940
6	▲	Stuart Bingham (ENG)	62940
7	▼	Mark Allen (NIR)	62460
8	▲	Ricky Walden (ENG)	59765
9	▲	Barry Hawkins (ENG)	58880
10	▼	Ding Junhui (CHN)	57900
11	▼	John Higgins (SCO)	56355
12	▼	Graeme Dott (SCO)	54900
13	▲	Mark Davis (ENG)	54280
14	▼	Matthew Stevens (WAL)	53660
15	▼	Mark Williams (WAL)	53260
16	▼	Ali Carter (ENG)	52895

=== Seeding revision 2 ===
No.	Ch.	Name	Points
1	▲	Neil Robertson (AUS)	90160
2	▼	Mark Selby (ENG)	83640
3	Steady	Judd Trump (ENG)	78200
4	Steady	Shaun Murphy (ENG)	68600
5	Steady	Stephen Maguire (SCO)	66480
6	▲	John Higgins (SCO)	64575
7	▲	Barry Hawkins (ENG)	63085
8	▼	Stuart Bingham (ENG)	61800
9	▼	Ricky Walden (ENG)	61710
10	▼	Mark Allen (NIR)	61220
11	▼	Ding Junhui (CHN)	59920
12	▲	Matthew Stevens (WAL)	58200
13	▲	Marco Fu (HKG)	57110
14	▲	Robert Milkins (ENG)	57005
15	▼	Mark Davis (ENG)	56080
16	▼	Graeme Dott (SCO)	55100

=== Seeding revision 3 ===
No.	Ch.	Name	Points
1	Steady	Neil Robertson (AUS)	86580
2	Steady	Mark Selby (ENG)	78100
3	Steady	Judd Trump (ENG)	75640
4	Steady	Shaun Murphy (ENG)	68680
5	Steady	Stephen Maguire (SCO)	66360
6	▲	Barry Hawkins (ENG)	65480
7	▲	Ding Junhui (CHN)	64700
8	▲	Ricky Walden (ENG)	63365
9	▼	John Higgins (SCO)	62415
10	▼	Stuart Bingham (ENG)	60760
11	▲	Marco Fu (HKG)	60565
12	▼	Mark Allen (NIR)	59260
13	▲	Robert Milkins (ENG)	57285
14	▲	Mark Davis (ENG)	56020
15	▲	Ali Carter (ENG)	55795
16	▼	Matthew Stevens (WAL)	54560

=== Seeding revision 4 ===
No.	Ch.	Name	Points
1	Steady	Neil Robertson (AUS)	87680
2	Steady	Mark Selby (ENG)	82220
3	▲	Ding Junhui (CHN)	79500
4	▼	Judd Trump (ENG)	74760
5	Steady	Stephen Maguire (SCO)	70200
6	▲	Marco Fu (HKG)	67805
7	▼	Shaun Murphy (ENG)	67400
8	▼	Barry Hawkins (ENG)	66620
9	▲	Stuart Bingham (ENG)	64540
10	▼	John Higgins (SCO)	64155
11	▲	Mark Allen (NIR)	63700
12	▼	Ricky Walden (ENG)	62685
13	▲	Mark Davis (ENG)	60440
14	▼	Robert Milkins (ENG)	58765
15	▲	Graeme Dott (SCO)	57340
16	▼	Ali Carter (ENG)	57015

=== Seeding revision 5 ===
No.	Ch.	Name	Points
1	Steady	Neil Robertson (AUS)	89800
2	Steady	Mark Selby (ENG)	87020
3	Steady	Ding Junhui (CHN)	79540
4	Steady	Judd Trump (ENG)	69960
5	Steady	Stephen Maguire (SCO)	69840
6	▲	Barry Hawkins (ENG)	69700
7	▲	Stuart Bingham (ENG)	69500
8	▼	Shaun Murphy (ENG)	66440
9	▼	Marco Fu (HKG)	64645
10	▲	Mark Allen (NIR)	63700
11	▲	Ricky Walden (ENG)	62485
12	▼	John Higgins (SCO)	62235
13	▲	Robert Milkins (ENG)	59925
14	▼	Mark Davis (ENG)	59440
15	▲	Joe Perry (ENG)	57995
16	▼	Graeme Dott (SCO)	57140

=== Seeding revision 6 ===
No.	Ch.	Name	Points
1	Steady	Neil Robertson (AUS)	89300
2	Steady	Mark Selby (ENG)	85160
3	Steady	Ding Junhui (CHN)	82520
4	Steady	Judd Trump (ENG)	70460
5	▲	Barry Hawkins (ENG)	68980
6	▲	Stuart Bingham (ENG)	68140
7	▼	Stephen Maguire (SCO)	64480
8	Steady	Shaun Murphy (ENG)	64420
9	Steady	Marco Fu (HKG)	63850
10	▲	John Higgins (SCO)	61375
11	▼	Mark Allen (NIR)	61340
12	▼	Ricky Walden (ENG)	58985
13	▲	Mark Davis (ENG)	58980
14	▼	Robert Milkins (ENG)	58615
15	Steady	Joe Perry (ENG)	56995
16	▲	Ali Carter (ENG)	56455

=== Seeding revision 7 ===
No.	Ch.	Name	Points
1	Steady	Neil Robertson (AUS)	88800
2	Steady	Mark Selby (ENG)	84480
3	Steady	Ding Junhui (CHN)	83660
4	▲	Barry Hawkins (ENG)	73500
5	▲	Stuart Bingham (ENG)	72320
6	▼	Judd Trump (ENG)	71640
7	▲	Marco Fu (HKG)	69750
8	Steady	Shaun Murphy (ENG)	69260
9	▼	Stephen Maguire (SCO)	64080
10	Steady	John Higgins (SCO)	63395
11	▲	Ricky Walden (ENG)	60350
12	▲	Mark Davis (ENG)	60055
13	▲	Ali Carter (ENG)	59615
14	▼	Mark Allen (NIR)	59220
15	Steady	Joe Perry (ENG)	58580
16	▼	Robert Milkins (ENG)	57165

== World ranking points ==
No.	Ch (Note: "Ch" = Change since the beginning of the season 2013/2014. See for the player rankings at the start of the season.)	Player	Season (Note: The 2011/2012 points only include the ranking points that count towards the next seedings update. All 36 new players will start on 0 points. Players on 0 points are ranked alphabetically. See for the points accumulated during the 2011/2012 season and see for points accumulated during the 2012/2013 season.)		Tournament												Season	Cut-off point (Note: See for the rankings at the first seedings cut-off point; see for the rankings at the second cut-off point; see for the rankings at the third cut-off point; see for the rankings at the fourth cut-off point; see for the rankings at the fifth cut-off point; see for the rankings at the sixth cut-off point; see for the rankings at the end of the season.)						Total
No.	Ch	Player	11/12	12/13	PTC	WUC	AO	SM	IO	IC	UK	GM	WEO	WOO	CO	WC	13/14	1	2	3	4	5	6	Total
1	Steady	(England) Mark Selby	0	43260	8600	560	3200	3500	1400	4000	6400	1400	2500	5600	3500	10000	50660	83640	78100	82220	87020	85160	84480	93920
2	Steady	(Australia) Neil Robertson	0	42440	4360	7000	4000	3500	2500	3040	8000	1400	1400	2660	5600	6400	49860	90160	86580	87680	89800	89300	88800	92300
3	▲7	(China) Ding Junhui	0	34320	6800	1960	0	7000	5000	8000	3040	5000	4000	2660	7000	1400	51860	59920	64700	79500	79540	82520	83660	86180
4	▲5	(England) Barry Hawkins	0	39020	6680	1960	1900	4480	900	2240	4000	1400	3200	1960	1260	6400	36380	63085	65480	66620	69700	68980	73500	75400
5	▼1	(England) Shaun Murphy	0	40320	6260	560	1900	2660	400	1440	3040	1900	1400	7000	2660	5000	34220	68600	68680	67400	66440	64420	69260	74540
6	▲11	(Hong Kong) Marco Fu	0	33725	6480	1960	5000	2660	1400	6400	640	900	2500	4480	1960	3800	38180	57110	60565	67805	64645	63850	69750	71905
7	▼4	(England) Judd Trump	0	41100	7560	1260		980	400	1440	3040	4000	1900	2660	1960	5000	30200	78200	75640	74760	69960	70460	71640	71300
8	▼2	(England) Stuart Bingham	0	40600	8000	1960	1900	980	1900	3040	5120	900	1900	1960	1260	1400	30320	61800	60760	64540	69500	68140	72320	70920
9	▼1	(England) Ricky Walden	0	36040	5440	1260	700	980	1400	640	5120	400	1900	2660	3500	3800	27800	61710	63365	62685	62485	58985	60350	63840
10	▼3	(Northern Ireland) Mark Allen	0	32120	7260	1260		980	1400	3040	4000	900	1400	4480	1260	3800	29780	61220	59260	63700	63700	61340	59220	61900
11	Steady	(Scotland) John Higgins	0	27035	7060	5600		2660	1900	2240	3040	1400	2500	3500	2660	1400	33960	64575	62415	64155	62235	61375	63395	60995
12	▲1	(England) Mark Davis	0	33150	5560		2500	3500	1900	3040	1440	2500	900	1960	560	1400	25260	56080	56020	60440	59440	58980	60055	58410
13	▲7	(England) Joe Perry	0	21900	5940	3500	2500	1960	1900	5120	3040	2500	3200	1260	560	3800	35280	50300	50375	55515	57995	56995	58580	57180
14	▲2	(England) Ali Carter	0	31195	2960	2660		1960	900	1440	2240	900	1900	1960	4480	3800	25200	54295	55795	57015	56815	56455	59615	56395
15	▼3	(Scotland) Graeme Dott	0	29520	4800	1260		980	400	5120	3040	1400	1400	3500	3500	1150	26550	55100	53100	57340	57140	55000	55480	56070
16	▲2	(England) Robert Milkins	0	31735	4520	4480	3200	2660	400	1440	3040	400	400	1960	560	1150	24210	57005	57285	58765	59925	58615	57165	55945

Player did not enter tournament.

== Points distribution ==
2013/2014 points distribution for world ranking and minor-ranking events:

Tournament	Round →	R128	R96	R64	R48	R32	R16	QF	SF	F	W
Wuxi Classic		560	–	1260	–	1960	2660	3500	4480	5600	7000
Australian Goldfields Open	Unseeded loser	400	650	900	1150	1400	1900	2500	3200	4000	5000
Australian Goldfields Open	Seeded loser	200	325	–	575	700	–	–	–	–	–
Shanghai Masters	Unseeded loser	560	910	1260	1610	1960	2660	3500	4480	5600	7000
Shanghai Masters	Seeded loser	280	455	–	805	980	–	–	–	–	–
Indian Open		400	–	900	–	1400	1900	2500	3200	4000	5000
International Championship		640	–	1440	–	2240	3040	4000	5120	6400	8000
UK Championship		640	–	1440	–	2240	3040	4000	5120	6400	8000
German Masters		400	–	900	–	1400	1900	2500	3200	4000	5000
Welsh Open		400	–	900	–	1400	1900	2500	3200	4000	5000
World Open		560	–	1260	–	1960	2660	3500	4480	5600	7000
Players Tour Championship	Regular events (Note: Composed by the European Tour and the Asian Tour.)	–	–	360	–	560	760	1000	1280	1600	2000
Players Tour Championship	Finals	–	–	–	–	840	1140	1500	1920	2400	3000
China Open		560	–	1260	–	1960	2660	3500	4480	5600	7000
World Championship	Unseeded loser	800	1300	1800	2300	2800	3800	5000	6400	8000	10000
World Championship	Seeded loser	400	650	–	1150	1400	–	–	–	–	–
