= 2012–13 snooker world ranking points =

Preceded by 2011/2012	2012/2013	Succeeded by 2013/2014

The official 2012/2013 snooker world ranking points for the professional snooker players on the World Snooker Main Tour in the 2012–13 season were based on performances in ranking tournaments over a two-year rolling period. The total points from the 2010/2011 and 2011/2012 seasons set the rankings at the start of 2012/2013 season and were updated after every ranking tournament. As points were accrued from tournaments in the current season, the points from the corresponding tournaments from two seasons ago were dropped. The rankings set the official seedings at the start of the season and at four further points during the season. The total points accumulated by the cut-off dates for the revised seedings were based on all the points up to that date in the 2012/2013 season, all of the points from the 2011/2012 season, and the points from the 2010/2011 season that had not yet been dropped. The total points from the 2011/2012 and 2012/2013 seasons set the rankings at the start of the 2013/2014 season.

== Seeding revisions ==
Cut-off point	Date	After	2010/2011 points dropped
1	13 August 2012	PTC – Event 2	PTC (1 · 2)
2	5 November 2012	International Championship	Shanghai Masters, World Open; PTC (3 · 4 · 5 · 6), EPTC (1 · 2)
3	10 December 2012	UK Championship	UK Championship; EPTC (3 · 4)
4	1 April 2013	China Open	German Masters, Welsh Open, China Open; EPTC (5 · 6), PTC (Finals)
Total	7 May 2013	World Championship	World Championship

== Ranking points ==
No.	Ch (Note: "Ch" = Change since the beginning of the season 2012/2013. See for the player rankings at the start of the season.)	Player	Season (Note: The 2010/2011 points only included the ranking points that counted towards the next seedings update. See for the points accumulated during the 2010/2011 season and see for points accumulated during the 2011/2012 season. Players ranked outside of the top 64 at the beginning of the 2012/2013 season had any points accumulated from the previous seasons wiped, and started again on 0 points. Players on 0 points were ranked alphabetically.)		Tournament (Note: See for the points accumulated during the 2012/2013 season up to the first cut-off point; see for the points accumulated between the first and second cut-off points; see for the points accumulated between the second and third; see for the points accumulated between the third and fourth cut-off points; see for the points accumulated at the World Championship.)											Season	Cut-off point (Note: See for the rankings at the first seedings cut-off point; see for the rankings at the second cut-off point; see for the rankings at the third cut-off point; see for the rankings at the fourth cut-off point; see for the rankings at the end of the season.)				Total
No.	Ch	Player	10/11	11/12	PTC	WUC	AO	SM	IC	UK	GM	WEO	WOO	CO	WC	12/13	1	2	3	4	Total
1	Steady	(England) Mark Selby	0	36480	10240	3500	700	980	3040	8000	2500	1400	3500	5600	3800	43260	77485	76620	81380	80940	79740
2	▲5	(Australia) Neil Robertson	0	37020	8520	980	1900	2660	6400	4000	3200	1900	4480	7000	1400	42440	62980	65180	65540	79460	79460
3	▼1	(England) Judd Trump	0	35620	8240	2660		5600	8000	1120	1400	3200	3500	980	6400	41100	72075	79155	79275	78320	76720
4	▲2	(England) Shaun Murphy	0	27900	4800	980	2500	4480	5120	6400	2500	1400	2660	4480	5000	40320	63925	67140	68220	67020	68220
5	▼1	(Scotland) Stephen Maguire	0	34520	7760	980		2660	3040	3040	1400	5000	2660	4480	1400	32420	63980	63080	60320	66940	66940
6	▲10	(England) Stuart Bingham	0	22340	9120	5600	700	3500	1120	4000	1400	4000	2660	3500	5000	40600	53700	54575	55255	61740	62940
7	▲5	(Northern Ireland) Mark Allen	0	30340	6820	2660		2660	4000	1120	1900	1900	7000	2660	1400	32120	53485	59800	56360	66060	62460
8	▲7	(England) Ricky Walden	0	23725	5200	7000	700	2660	4000	1120	1400	1400	3500	2660	6400	36040	54245	54125	53165	54765	59765
9	▲13	(England) Barry Hawkins	0	19860	8220	1960	5000	1960	920	3040	3200	1400	2660	2660	8000	39020	47700	46915	47915	54680	58880
10	▲1	(China) Ding Junhui	0	23580	11720	980	1900	980	3040	1120	1900	3200	3500	980	5000	34320	56220	54280	53840	59300	57900
11	▼6	(Scotland) John Higgins	0	29320	7040			7000	1120	3040	575	1400	4480	980	1400	27035	61680	72040	70680	64955	56355
12	▲1	(Scotland) Graeme Dott	0	25380	5440	3500		3500	1120	3040	1900	1900	2660	2660	3800	29520	52225	52740	52500	56100	54900
13	▲6	(England) Mark Davis	0	21130	6760	4480	3200	1960	3040	5120	575	575	980	2660	3800	33150	48210	46670	50190	51630	54280
14	▼4	(Wales) Matthew Stevens	0	27080	4280	0	1900	980	3040	4000	2500	1900	5600	980	1400	26580	53900	50140	52660	55060	53660
15	▼12	(Wales) Mark Williams	0	26680	7680	3500		4480	1120	1120	1400	1400	980	3500	1400	26580	67740	64400	60320	58260	53260
16	▲1	(England) Ali Carter	0	21700	6620	980	700	3500	2240	5120	5000	575	0	2660	3800	31195	48900	47000	51760	52895	52895
17	▲11	(Hong Kong) Marco Fu	0	16065	6900	805	3200	1960	4000	3040	4000	1400	2660	1960	3800	33725	39390	42490	41930	47390	49790
18	▲18	(England) Robert Milkins	0	16845	8200	3500	575	1960	2240	2240	1400	2500	2660	2660	3800	31735	37200	39890	41530	47080	48580
19	▼10	(England) Ronnie O'Sullivan	0	36360	0				0						10000	10000	52060	44860	43740	41360	46360
20	▲4	(England) Joe Perry	0	22680	7140	2660	700	3500	920	920	1400	1900	805	805	1150	21900	43510	46640	46800	46230	44580
21	▼13	(England) Stephen Lee	0	32115	6080	980	2500	2660	0							12220	60670	59670	55430	47135	44335
22	▼4	(England) Andrew Higginson	0	22940	6600	980	700	805	2240	920	1900	1900	1960	1960	1150	21115	45570	40335	38495	44055	44055
23	Steady	(Wales) Dominic Dale	0	20130	5520	1960	700	1960	3040	2240	1400	1400	1960	805	2800	23785	43075	42475	43595	43915	43915
24	▲2	(England) Tom Ford	0	21740	7760	1960	1900	1960	920	2240	575	1900	805	805	1150	21975	40500	40100	41460	43465	43715
25	▼11	(England) Martin Gould	0	22180	6800	980	2500	980	1120	2240	575	575	1960	805	2800	21335	51650	45030	44830	44515	43515
26	▲7	(England) Michael Holt	0	20715	5320	1960	1400	805	920	2240	2500	575	1960	1960	2800	22440	36400	38515	41155	42655	43155
27	▲8	(Republic of Ireland) Ken Doherty	0	17645	7840	2660	1400	1610	2240	920	1400	2500	805	1960	1150	24485	36565	38655	37215	42130	42130
28	▼3	(Scotland) Marcus Campbell	0	17650	4480	4480	1400	1960	920	920	1400	575	1960	3500	2800	24395	44035	42545	41505	42045	42045
29	▲2	(England) Mark King	0	18800	4080	805	575	2660	1840	3040	1900	1400	805	1960	3800	22865	34730	35885	37605	40665	41665
30	▼10	(England) Peter Ebdon	0	17285	2000	1960	4000	1960	5120	920	575	575	1960	980	2800	22850	46605	44505	43505	38735	40135
31	▼1	(Wales) Ryan Day	0	18905	4960	805	1900	2660	2240	3040	575	575	1960	805	1150	20670	39195	43670	43470	41225	39575
32	▲5	(China) Liang Wenbo	0	17780	5640	630	1400	630	1840	2240	1150	1400	630	1960	2300	19820	33140	32465	32585	36450	37600
33	▲10	(England) Ben Woollaston	0	17240	10420	630	450	630	720	1840	1150	450	630	630	2800	20350	30655	32075	33315	36090	37590
34	▲20	(Wales) Michael White	0	13865	5640	1960	1150	1260	2240	2240	450	450	1610	630	5000	22630	30005	32440	32800	33295	36495
35	▲5	(England) Jack Lisowski	0	14275	5940	1610	1400	630	720	2240	450	450	1610	3500	2800	21350	33480	30170	31930	34625	35625
36	▼2	(Republic of Ireland) Fergal O'Brien	0	17820	3360	2660	575	1960	2240	2240	575	1400	805	805	1150	17770	35510	34780	35540	36740	35590
37	▲4	(China) Xiao Guodong	0	16595	7380	630	1400	630	720	1840	1400	450	630	1610	900	17590	31205	30745	31505	34585	34185
38	▼11	(England) Jamie Cope	0	15720	3720	2660	1900	2660	920	920	575	0	1960	1960	1150	18425	40720	36280	36640	36795	34145
39	Steady	(Scotland) Jamie Burnett	0	14590	5600	2660	1900	1610	2240	920	1400	575	805	805	900	19415	34630	34770	33490	35905	34005
40	▼11	(Wales) Jamie Jones	0	19670	3320	805	575	1960	720	720	1150	450	630	1610	900	12840	35205	33625	32305	33410	32510
41	▲16	(England) David Gilbert	0	15095	1440	1610	1150	1610	1840	1840	450	1150	1960	1610	2300	16960	25664	26330	26856	30194	32055
42	▲17	(England) Mark Joyce	0	9265	6160	1260	325	1610	1440	3040	1150	1150	1960	1960	2300	22355	24595	25640	25120	30220	31620
43	▼11	(England) Anthony Hamilton	0	16230	4600	805	0	805	1840	720	1900	1400	630	1610	900	15210	34495	32500	32980	32840	31440
44	Steady	(England) Matthew Selt	0	15045	1280	1610	2500	630	720	1840	1150	1150	630	1610	2800	15920	31880	29845	29325	30465	30965
45	▼7	(England) Rory McLeod	0	13870	5040	1610	1400	630	720	1840	1150	450	630	2660	900	17030	32775	31845	32445	33800	30900
46	▼1	(England) Nigel Bond	0	14425	2600	630	1400	1610	1840	720	1150	1150	2660	1610	900	16270	28905	28485	28125	30695	30695
47	▲11	(China) Yu Delu	0	14690	5160	455	325	455	1440	1840	450	450	1610	630	2300	15115	24399	24430	26636	27944	29805
48	▲2	(Scotland) Anthony McGill	0	12790	5500	630	1150	1610	1440	1440	450	450	1260	1960	900	16790	26360	24650	25410	29330	29580
49	▲3	(Scotland) Alan McManus	0	11955	4960	630	1400	455	720	520	1150	2500	1960	455	2800	17550	27605	24970	24970	29005	29505
50	▼2	(England) Dave Harold	0	11555	4480	1960	1150	1610	1840	720	1400	450	1610	1610	900	17730	28705	28075	29195	31185	29285
51	Steady	(England) Steve Davis	0	14370	3360	630	450	1960	520	2240	450	1150	630	1610	900	13900	26865	26140	27660	29670	28270
52	▲3	(England) Jimmy Robertson	0	12045	3880	1610	450	1960	520	1440	450	1150	630	1960	1800	15850	26055	25530	26450	28895	27895
53	▲7	(England) Alfie Burden	0	9560	6660	1260	325	1260	1840	520	1150	1150	1260	455	2300	18180	24665	23985	24545	26090	27740
54	▲2	(China) Liu Chuang	0	11860	4040	1260	1150	455	1840	720	1150	1150	1610	1260	650	15285	26880	27320	25560	28795	27145
55	▼9	(England) Jimmy White	0	12930	3200	630	0	1610	720	520	1150	450	1260	455	2300	12295	27445	25440	23920	23575	25225
56	▼14	(Northern Ireland) Gerard Greene	0	13275	1280	1610	1150	630	720	720	450	1400	630	630	650	9870	29330	27190	26030	23645	23145
57	▼4	(England) Peter Lines	0	12995	2160	1610	450	455	520	520	1900	450	455	455	650	9625	26170	23895	22575	22870	22620
58	▼37	(Scotland) Stephen Hendry	0	22175												0	40035	35475	32435	25975	22175
59	▲14	(England) Rod Lawler	0	0	7340	2660	900	1610	520	1840	1150	1150	1610	455	2300	21535	4680	9890	12450	19235	21535
60	▲2	(England) Adam Duffy	0	12540	720	455	325	455	1440	1440	1150	1150	455	455	650	8695	20769	19520	19646	21024	21235
61	▲2	(Thailand) James Wattana	0	10685	2200	455	1150	455	520	1440	1150	450	455	455	1800	10530	23335	21440	20840	21215	21215
62	▲2	(England) Barry Pinches	0	6820	1800	1610	1150	1610	2240	520	1150	1150	455	1260	650	13595	21015	20415	20575	20415	20415
63	▼14	(England) Mike Dunn	0	12070	0	630	450	630	520	520	450	1150	1260	1260	650	7520	25810	21760	20800	21240	19590
64	▲8	(Norway) Kurt Maflin	0	0	6720	1610	900	910	1840	520	1900	450	280	1260	2300	18690	2870	7180	8820	16390	18690
65	▼4	(England) Andy Hicks	0	9880	1120	455	325	1260	520	1440	450	450	455	1260	650	8385	22435	18715	19075	18265	18265
66	▲4	(China) Cao Yupeng	0	0	5320	280	1900	1260	3040	2240	450	450	1260	455	650	17305	3460	9600	13200	16655	17305
67	▲15	(Thailand) Dechawat Poomjaeng	0	0	3880	455	900	455	1040	1040	1400	1150	910	1960	3800	16990	2115	4890	7050	13190	16990
68	New entry	(England) Ian Burns	0	0	4520	280	650	1260	1040	1840	450	1400	1960	1260	1300	15960	1850	5230	7830	14660	15960
69	New entry	(Thailand) Thepchaiya Un-Nooh	0	0	3200	910	900	1260	1440	1840	1150	1150	1610	455	1800	15715	1810	6030	8990	13915	15715
70	▲8	(China) Tian Pengfei	0	0	5640	910	650	910	1040	1440	1150	450	910	1260	1300	15660	2560	6430	8950	14360	15660
71	New entry	(Thailand) Thanawat Thirapongpaiboon	0	0	3840	910	1150	1610	320	1440	450	450	910	1260	1800	14140	2780	5070	7270	12340	14140
72	▲7	(Belgium) Luca Brecel	0	0	3480	1260	200	910	1440	4000	450	450	455	455	400	13500	2220	6010	10370	13100	13500
73	▲7	(India) Aditya Mehta	0	0	1840	1610	650	1610	3040	520	450	1150	280	910	1300	13360	2260	7630	8710	12060	13360
74	New entry	(India) Pankaj Advani	0	0	3480	280	900	280	2240	1440	1150	2500	280	280	400	13230	2300	6460	7900	12830	13230
75	▲6	(England) Paul Davison	0	0	4400	910	200	280	1840	1040	450	1150	280	1260	1300	13110	2030	6350	8310	11810	13110
76	▼10	(England) Liam Highfield	0	0	2560	280	1150	1260	1040	1040	450	450	1610	910	2300	13050	1790	4810	6210	10750	13050
77	New entry	(China) Zhang Anda	0	0	3080	280	200	280	1040	1040	1150	1150	1610	280	1800	11910	1480	3880	5920	10110	11910
78	New entry	(China) Chen Zhe	0	0	3520	910	200	280	320	1440	1150	450	1610	1610	400	11890	2390	4310	6670	11490	11890
79	New entry	(England) Robbie Williams	0	0	4040	280	650	910	1440	320	450	450	1260	1260	400	11460	1850	6040	6720	11060	11460
80	New entry	(England) Michael Wasley	0	0	2240	910	900		1040	1040	1400	1400	280	910	1300	11420	2170	3770	5570	10120	11420
81	▼5	(England) Sam Baird	0	0	1080	280	900	280	1040	320	1150	1900	910	280	2800	10940	1900	3220	3540	8140	10940
82	▼17	(Malta) Tony Drago	0	0	2400	1260	900	910	320	320	450	450	280	1260	1800	10350	2720	4310	5750	8550	10350
83	New entry	(England) Craig Steadman	0	0	3120	910	325	280	320	1440	450	1400	280	280	1300	10105	1795	3475	5835	8805	10105
84	▼17	(China) Li Yan	0	0	3920	1260	325	455	320	320	450	450	280	280	1300	9360	2865	4760	6600	8060	9360
85	▼2	(England) Simon Bedford	0	0	2200	1260	325			320	1150	450	1960	280	400	8345	2145	3425	4105	7945	8345
86	New entry	(England) Martin O'Donnell	0	0	1000	910	900	280	1040	320	1150	1150	910	280	400	8340	1810	3130	3450	7940	8340
87	New entry	(Wales) Daniel Wells	0	0	1440	280	200	280	1040	1040	1150	1150	280	910	400	8170	480	2520	4280	7770	8170
88	▼11	(England) David Grace	0	0	2560	280	325	1610	320	320	450	450	280	910	400	7905	1725	4735	5415	7505	7905
89	New entry	(Scotland) Scott Donaldson	0	0	2720			1260	320	320	450	450	910	280	400	7110	720	3220	3900	6710	7110
90	New entry	(England) Joel Walker	0	0	2000	910	200	280	320	320	450	450	280	280	400	5890	1470	2790	3110	5490	5890
91	New entry	(England) Sean O'Sullivan	0	0	720	280	200	280	320	320	450	450	910	1260	400	5590	480	1440	1760	5190	5590
92	▼18	(Thailand) Passakorn Suwannawat	0	0	0	1610	325	455	320	320	450	1150	280	280	400	5590	1935	2710	3030	5190	5590
93	▼4	(England) Jamie O'Neill	0	0	360	280	200	280	320	1040	450	450	0	280	400	4060	480	1440	2480	3660	4060
94	New entry	(Scotland) Michael Leslie	0	0	0	280	200	280	320	320	450	450	910	280	400	3890	480	1080	1400	3490	3890
95	New entry	(Australia) Ben Judge	0	0	1080	280	200	910	320	320	450					3560	840	2430	3110	3560	3560
96	New entry	(Egypt) Mohamed Khairy	0	0	0			0	0		0	450	280	280	400	1410	0	0	0	1010	1410
97	New entry	(Iran) Hossein Vafaei	0	0	360	0	0	0		0						360	0	360	360	360	360
159	New entry	(Canada) Floyd Ziegler	0	0	0			0								0	0	0	0	0	0
		(England) ~~Joe~~ ~~Jogia~~ (Note: Joe Jogia was banned from all WPBSA events for the whole 2012/2013 season, and was removed from the official rankings following the 2013 Munich Open, after his WPBSA membership was terminated.)	6655	12280												0	25045	20735	18935		

Player did not enter tournament.
