= 2011–12 snooker world ranking points =

Preceded by 2010/2011	2011/2012	Succeeded by 2012/2013

The official 2011/2012 snooker world ranking points for the professional snooker players on the World Snooker Main Tour in the 2011–12 season were based on performances in ranking tournaments over a two-year rolling period. As points were accrued from tournaments in the current season, the points from the corresponding tournaments from two seasons ago were dropped. The total points from the 2009/2010 and 2010/2011 seasons set the rankings at the start of 2011/2012 season and were updated after every ranking tournament. The rankings set the official seedings at the start of the season and at three further points during the season. The total points accumulated by the cut-off dates for the revised seedings were based on all the points up to that date in the 2011/2012 season, all of the points from the 2010/2011 season, and the points from the 2009/2010 season that have not yet been dropped. The total points from the 2010/2011 and 2011/2012 seasons set the rankings at the start of the 2012/2013 season.

== Seeding revisions ==
Cut-off point	Date	After	2009/2010 points dropped
1	3 October 2011	Warsaw Classic	Shanghai Masters, Grand Prix
2	9 January 2012	FFB Snooker Open	UK Championship
3	20 February 2012	Welsh Open	Welsh Open
Total	8 May 2012	World Championship	China Open, World Championship

== Ranking points ==
No.	Ch	Player	Season (Note: The 2009/2010 points only included the points that counted towards the next seedings update. See for the points accumulated during the 2009/2010 and 2010/2011 seasons.)		Tournament (Note: See for ranking points accumulated up to the Players Tour Championship Finals and for points accumulated at the China Open and World Snooker Championship.)									Season	Cut-off point (Note: See for the rankings at the first seedings cut-off point; see for the second, see for the third and see at the end of the season.)			Total
No.	Ch	Player	09/10	10/11	PTC	AO	SM	UK	GM	WEO	WOO	CO	WC	11/12	1	2	3	Total
1	▲2	(England) Mark Selby	0	38445	8900	2500	7000	3040	2500	4000	4480	2660	1400	36480	67385	69945	73945	74925
2	▲7	(England) Judd Trump	0	33355	10980	700	980	8000	2500	2500	2660	3500	3800	35620	46465	57385	60985	68975
3	▼2	(Wales) Mark Williams	0	36880	2200	4000	5600	3040	2500	1900	980	2660	3800	26680	63540	65020	66920	63560
4	▲4	(Scotland) Stephen Maguire	0	26880	9360	700	980	4000	4000	2500	980	5600	6400	34520	45980	49660	52960	61400
5	▼3	(Scotland) John Higgins	0	32000	8320	700	3500	3040	1900	1900	3500	2660	3800	29320	57540	58180	56980	61320
6	▲1	(England) Shaun Murphy	0	31785	4920	3200	3500	4000	3200	3200	3500	980	1400	27900	50485	54085	59785	59685
7	▼2	(Australia) Neil Robertson	0	22520	11760	1900	4480	5120	1900	700	2660	3500	5000	37020	52100	57940	58640	59540
8	▲10	(England) Stephen Lee	0	24435	11280	575	1960	1120	3200	2500	5600	4480	1400	32115	38750	40550	45675	56550
9	▲2	(England) Ronnie O'Sullivan	0	16700	8960	0	2660	3040	5000	3200	0	3500	10000	36360	38660	40540	45540	53060
10	▲4	(Wales) Matthew Stevens	0	25680	7080	700	3500	3040	2500	1900	980	980	6400	27080	37815	43015	45515	52760
11	▼7	(China) Ding Junhui	0	28760	5340	700	980	4000	700	5000	980	4480	1400	23580	51420	48740	53740	52340
12	Steady	(Northern Ireland) Mark Allen	0	19725	5000	2500	2660	6400	1900	2500	7000	980	1400	30340	39625	48265	50165	50065
13	▼3	(Scotland) Graeme Dott	0	24065	10500	700	980	3040	1900	700	3500	2660	1400	25380	44405	50005	50705	49445
14	▲7	(England) Martin Gould	0	25110	9120	1400	2660	3040	700	1900	980	980	1400	22180	37210	45370	47520	47290
15	▲5	(England) Ricky Walden	0	23220	8980	575	805	5120	1900	575	1960	2660	1150	23725	32810	39730	41630	46945
16	▲1	(England) Stuart Bingham	0	24260	4720	5000	2660	1120	1900	1900	980	2660	1400	22340	40955	41115	43515	46600
17	▼11	(England) Ali Carter	0	24520	4080	700	980	3040	700	700	0	3500	8000	21700	46760	48200	45600	46220
18	▲7	(England) Andrew Higginson	0	20230	10120	1400	1960	920	1400	575	1960	805	3800	22940	34590	37470	37545	43170
19	Steady	(England) Mark Davis	0	20360	7820	1900	1960	2240	1400	1400	805	805	2800	21130	36860	40300	41700	41490
20	▼7	(England) Peter Ebdon	0	23360	1280	700	980	920	1400	1400	805	7000	2800	17285	34600	32840	34940	40645
21	▼5	(Scotland) Stephen Hendry	0	17860	4960	1900	980	2240	575	1900	1960	2660	5000	22175	34260	37140	37715	40035
22	Steady	(England) Barry Hawkins	0	20080	7040	575	805	920	1400	1400	1960	1960	3800	19860	32680	35240	36140	39940
23	▲8	(Wales) Dominic Dale	0	19725	5560	2500	1960	2240	575	575	1960	1960	2800	20130	30235	34075	33825	39855
24	▲3	(England) Joe Perry	0	15990	8660	1400	805	920	1900	575	2660	1960	3800	22680	29915	33435	35210	38670
25	▼1	(Scotland) Marcus Campbell	0	20745	4960	1900	805	2240	1400	575	2660	1960	1150	17650	32280	35480	36055	38395
26	▲8	(England) Tom Ford	0	15340	6920	1900	1610	2240	1400	1900	2660	1960	1150	21740	28940	32980	34880	37080
27	▼12	(England) Jamie Cope	0	21360	4520	700	2660	920	575	575	2660	1960	1150	15720	35100	36820	36070	37080
28	▼5	(Hong Kong) Marco Fu	0	20760	3720		805	4000	575	1400	1960	805	2800	16065	29405	34885	36160	36825
29	▲18	(Wales) Jamie Jones	0	15275	6580	450	630	1840	1150	450	1610	1960	5000	19670	23035	26155	26915	34945
30	▼2	(Wales) Ryan Day	0	16025	4720	1400	1960	2240	1400	575	805	805	5000	18905	29185	32905	32380	34930
31	▼5	(England) Mark King	0	14750	4240	575	4480	920	575	1400	3500	1960	1150	18800	31685	31765	31840	33550
32	▲4	(England) Anthony Hamilton	0	16740	3320	450	3500	1840	1150	450	1610	1610	2300	16230	27090	28530	28980	32970
33	▲12	(England) Michael Holt	0	11765	8940	1150	2660	720	325	1400	2660	1960	900	20715	24875	28275	29425	32480
34	▲3	(Republic of Ireland) Fergal O'Brien	0	14455	7200	1150	2660	920	575	1400	805	1960	1150	17820	29505	31705	32280	32275
35	▼6	(Republic of Ireland) Ken Doherty	0	14500	4880	3200	805	920	1400	1400	630	1610	2800	17645	28145	29865	31515	32145
36	▼3	(England) Robert Milkins	0	14400	2360	575	2660	2240	1150	450	4480	630	2300	16845	25575	26895	27595	31245
37	▼7	(China) Liang Wenbo	0	12210	4880	1900	1960	720	900	1400	1610	1610	2800	17780	26090	25850	27575	29990
38	▼3	(England) Rory McLeod	0	16095	3960	1900	630	2240	900	575	805	1960	900	13870	27635	30235	30560	29965
39	Steady	(Scotland) Jamie Burnett	0	14520	3400	1150	1610	1840	900	1150	1610	630	2300	14590	23440	25480	27080	29110
40	▲12	(England) Jack Lisowski	0	14595	6780	900	1960	720	325	450	630	1610	900	14275	24175	26335	26270	28870
41	▲23	(China) Xiao Guodong	0	11860	8660	325	455	1840	900	900	455	1260	1800	16595	21000	24200	25100	28455
42	▼10	(Northern Ireland) Gerard Greene	0	14935	4040	575	805	1840	325	1150	1610	630	2300	13275	25330	27530	28430	28210
43	▲26	(England) Ben Woollaston	0	10535	7400	1150	910	1840	900	325	455	1960	2300	17240	20685	23405	24430	27775
44	▼1	(England) Matthew Selt	0	12725	4080	2500	1610	2240	325	1150	1610	630	900	15045	24025	26265	26840	27770
45	▼5	(England) Nigel Bond	0	12450	4960	1400	1960	1840	325	450	1960	630	900	14425	23315	26995	27195	26875
46	▲9	(England) Jimmy White	0	13525	4240	900	1260	1440	1150	450	630	1960	900	12930	20880	24520	25220	26455
47	▲2	(England) Joe Jogia	0	14125	4800	450	455	2240	325	450	630	630	2300	12280	22080	25280	25405	26405
48	Steady	(England) Dave Harold	0	14400	4760	450	630	720	325	1150	1610	1260	650	11555	22235	24315	24390	25955
49	▼11	(England) Mike Dunn	0	13380	3880	1150	630	720	1400	1150	1610	630	900	12070	23750	24470	26570	25450
50	▲9	(Scotland) Anthony McGill	0	12630	4200	325	1260	1440	1150	900	1260	455	1800	12790	20495	22375	23585	25420
51	▼7	(England) Steve Davis	0	10855	5560	0	630	2240	900	1900	630	1610	900	14370	23425	25665	27890	25225
52	▼1	(Scotland) Alan McManus	0	12740	5160	325	1260	720	900	450	630	1610	900	11955	22585	25265	25465	24695
53	▼3	(England) Peter Lines	0	11515	3680	325	1260	2240	1150	325	455	1260	2300	12995	20930	20450	21600	24510
54	▲12	(Wales) Michael White	0	10630	5920	200	1260	1840	1150	325	1260	1260	650	13865	18040	21360	22635	24495
55	▼2	(England) Jimmy Robertson	0	12230	4960	900	455	1440	900	325	1960	455	650	12045	20075	23195	23770	24275
56	▲4	(China) Liu Chuang	0	12250	2840	325	1260	520	1150	900	455	1610	2800	11860	19035	19715	20925	24110
57	▲19	(England) David Gilbert	0	8325	4280	1900	280	1440	325	900	1260	910	3800	15095	15715	19035	19360	23420
58	New entry	(China) Yu Delu	0	8325	4240	1150	910	320	1900	650	1610	1610	2300	14690	15745	17465	19175	23015
59	▼17	(England) Mark Joyce	0	13545	2760	1150	630	1440	325	1400	455	455	650	9265	21770	23410	24810	22810
60	▼3	(England) Alfie Burden	0	13200	1640	325	455	520	900	900	1610	910	2300	9560	18620	18660	19620	22760
61	Steady	(England) Andy Hicks	0	11935	3320	325	455	520	1150	1400	455	455	1800	9880	18245	19365	21015	21815
62	New entry	(England) Adam Duffy	0	8325	4600	200	280	1440	900	1150	1260	910	1800	12540	15125	17365	18575	20865
63	▲4	(Thailand) James Wattana	0	9925	3120	650	1960	520	1400	325	455	455	1800	10685	20025	20585	21660	20610
64	▼23	(England) Barry Pinches	0	13675	1080	1400	1610	520	325	325	455	455	650	6820	21775	22495	21995	20495
65	▼19	(Malta) Tony Drago	0	11820	3120	450	630	1440	325	325	1260	455	650	8655	21180	22620	21870	20475
66	▲2	(England) Liam Highfield	0	10605	3320	1150	280	320	325	650	1260	1260	1300	9865	16915	18195	18330	20470
67	▼5	(China) Liu Song	0	12290	2360	325	1610	520	1400	325	455	455	650	8100	18330	19610	19935	20390
68	New entry	(China) Li Yan	0	8325	4280	900	910	2240	325	325		1610	1300	11890	16095	19175	18985	20215
69	▼15	(Northern Ireland) Joe Swail	0	12190	2400	325	455	520	900	650	910	910	400	7470	18260	18420	19395	19660
70	▼14	(England) Adrian Gunnell	0	8970	1440	900	1610	2240	1400	325	455	1610	650	10630	18400	19520	20795	19600
71	New entry	(China) Cao Yupeng	0	8325	1640	200	1260	1440	325	900	280	1260	3800	11105	14065	15385	15770	19430
72	▼9	(England) Ian McCulloch	0	9505	2400	325	1260	1440	325	1150	1610	910	400	9820	17010	19010	19335	19325
73	▲5	(Republic of Ireland) David Morris	0	8325	2960	650	910	320	900	650	910	910	2300	10510	14980	16820	17470	18835
74	▲11	(Norway) Kurt Maflin	0	8325	3160	900	1610	1040	325	1150	1260	280	400	10125	15115	17555	18190	18450
75	▼17	(England) Rod Lawler	0	9705	1640	900	455	1040	325	900	910	1260	1300	8730	17445	18325	19225	18435
76	New entry	(England) Sam Craigie	0	8325	3120	900	280	1040	1150	200	1260	1610	400	9960	14505	16185	16695	18285
77	New entry	(Thailand) Passakorn Suwannawat	0	8325	3920	200	1610	1040	325	200	910	280	1300	9785	16135	17615	17300	18110
78	New entry	(England) Andrew Norman	0	8325	3280	900	1260	1040	325	650	910	910	400	9675	15645	17325	17460	18000
79	New entry	(England) Sam Baird	0	8325	2920	650	280	1040	325	1400	1960	280	400	9255	13895	15735	16620	17580
80	New entry	(England) David Grace	0	8325	2800	200	910	1040	900	200	280	1610	1300	9240	13715	15795	16055	17565
81	New entry	(China) Tian Pengfei	0	8325	2360	1150	910	1440	325	200	1260	910	400	8955	14825	16705	16390	17280
82	New entry	(Belgium) Luca Brecel	0	8325	3120	200	280	320	325	200	280	1260	2800	8785	13445	14765	14450	17110
83	New entry	(India) Aditya Mehta	0	8325	2280	200	1610	320	325	200	910	1260	1300	8405	14415	15255	14940	16730
84	▼13	(Wales) Andrew Pagett	0	10260	2200	650	280	320	900	200	280	280	400	5510	15830	16230	16490	15770
85	▲3	(England) Adam Wicheard	0	8325	1080	200	910	1040	900	1400	280	280	1300	7390	13155	14075	15535	15715
86	▼13	(England) Paul Davison	0	9795	1640	650	280	320	1400	200	280	280	400	5450	15005	15205	15965	15245
87	New entry	(Thailand) Dechawat Poomjaeng	0	8325	4040	200	280	320	325	0	1260		400	6825	14005	15685	15170	15150
88	▼18	(England) Matthew Couch	0	10390	1440	900	280	320	325				400	3665	15550	15190	15315	14055
89	▼10	(England) Simon Bedford	0	8325	3520	200	280	320	325					4645	14225	14425	14550	12970
90	New entry	(Scotland) Scott MacKenzie	0	8325	2040	1150	280	320	325					4115	14595	14635	14120	12440
91	New entry	(Wales) Daniel Wells	0	8325	0	200	280	320	325	650	280	280	1300	3635	12165	11645	11780	11960
92	New entry	(England) Stuart Carrington	0	8325	360	200	280	320	900	200	280	280	400	3220	12525	12005	12265	11545
93	New entry	(Republic of Ireland) David Hogan	0	8325	1080	200	910	320	325					2835	13515	13355	12840	11160
94	New entry	(Finland) Robin Hull	0	8325	0	650	910	1040	0					2600	13245	13445	12605	10925
95	▼30	(Belgium) Bjorn Haneveer	0	9825	560	200	0	320	0					1080	15565	15565	14665	10905
96	New entry	(India) Lucky Vatnani	0	8325	0	0	0	320	325	900	280	280	400	2505	11685	11165	11550	10830
97	New entry	(Poland) Kacper Filipiak	0	8325	0	200	280	320	325			280	400	1805	12165	11645	11130	10130
98	▼18	(Brazil) Igor Figueiredo	0	8325									1800	1800	11685	10845	10005	10125
99	New entry	(Northern Ireland) Joe Meara	0	8325	0	200	280	320	325					1125	12165	11645	11130	9450

Player did not enter tournament.
