= 2009–10 snooker world ranking points =

Preceded by 2008/2009	2009/2010	Succeeded by 2010/2011

Snooker world ranking points 2009/2010: The official world ranking points for the 96 professional snooker players in the 2009–10 season are listed below. The total points from the seasons 2008–09 and 2009–10 were used to determine the seedings at the start of the 2010/2011 season.

== Ranking points ==
No.	Ch	Player	Points 08/09	SM	GP	UK	WO	CO	WSC	Points 09/10	Total
1	▲3	(Scotland) John Higgins	31000	4480	4480	6400	5000	2660	3800	26820	57820
2	▲7	(Australia) Neil Robertson	22825	980	7000	3040	1900	2660	10000	25580	48405
3	▼2	(England) Ronnie O'Sullivan	23875	7000	2660	5120	3200	980	5000	23960	47835
4	▲1	(England) Ali Carter	24100	2660	980	4000	4000	4480	6400	22520	46620
5	▲8	(China) Ding Junhui	13775	3500	5600	8000	700	5600	3800	27200	40975
6	▼4	(Scotland) Stephen Maguire	22075	980	2660	5120	3200	2660	3800	18420	40495
7	▼4	(England) Shaun Murphy	23475	4480	980	3040	700	980	5000	15180	38655
8	▲7	(Wales) Mark Williams	14219	2660	4480	3040	2500	7000	3800	23480	37699
9	▼2	(England) Mark Selby	17925	980	980	4000	2500	2660	6400	17520	35445
10	▲1	(Northern Ireland) Mark Allen	17800	980	3500	1120	2500	4480	5000	17580	35380
11	▼1	(Scotland) Stephen Hendry	16225	2660	2660	3040	1900	3500	3800	17560	33785
12	▼6	(Wales) Ryan Day	21250	3500	980	1120	2500	2660	1400	12160	33410
13	▲15	(Scotland) Graeme Dott	14025	1960	805	2240	1900	1960	8000	16865	30890
14	▼6	(Hong Kong) Marco Fu	19275	2660	980	1120	700	3500	1400	10360	29635
15	▲1	(England) Mark King	14625	1960	2660	3040	1900	3500	1400	14460	29085
16	▲10	(China) Liang Wenbo	12325	5600	1960	4000	575	805	2800	15740	28065
17	▲1	(England) Jamie Cope	13763	2660	2660	2240	1900	1960	2800	14220	27983
18	▼4	(England) Peter Ebdon	14425	980	3500	3040	700	3500	1400	13120	27545
19	▼7	(England) Joe Perry	14625	980	3500	1120	700	2660	3800	12760	27385
20		(England) Ricky Walden	15825	3500	1960	2240	575	805	1150	10230	26055
21	▼4	(England) Barry Hawkins	14200	2660	805	920	1900	1960	2800	11045	25245
22	▲1	(England) Steve Davis	14975	805	805	2240	575	805	5000	10230	25205
23	▲2	(England) Stephen Lee	13619	1960	805	3040	575	805	2800	9985	23604
24		(England) Michael Holt	14275	1960	805	2240	575	805	2800	9185	23460
25	▲1	(Wales) Matthew Stevens	12669	2660	1960	2240	1900	805	1150	10715	23384
26	▲21	(England) Mark Davis	9875	1610	2660	1840	1400	1960	3800	13270	23145
27	▲3	(England) Judd Trump	14200	805	805	2240	1400	1960	1150	8360	22560
28	▲4	(Northern Ireland) Gerard Greene	10513	1960	1960	2240	575	1960	2800	11495	22008
29	▼8	(England) Stuart Bingham	10644	2660	1960	3040	1400	805	1150	11015	21659
30	▲14	(Republic of Ireland) Ken Doherty	7794	3500	2660	1840	1150	1610	2800	13560	21354
31	▼12	(England) Dave Harold	14363	805	805	920	1400	805	1150	5885	20248
32	▲11	(England) Andrew Higginson	10550	1960	630	1840	1900	1960	900	9190	19740
33	▲5	(England) Mike Dunn	10288	630	1610	2240	450	1960	2300	9190	19478
34	▲5	(England) Rory McLeod	10238	630	630	2240	1150	1960	2300	8910	19148
35	▲2	(England) Stuart Pettman	11607	1610	630	720	1150	630	2800	7540	19147
36	▲19	(England) Robert Milkins	7857	1260	3500	1840	900	1960	1800	11260	19117
37	▲3	(Scotland) Jamie Burnett	11250	1610	1960	720	450	1610	900	7250	18500
38	▼9	(England) Nigel Bond	9082	1960	1960	920	575	2660	1150	9225	18307
39	▼17	(Northern Ireland) Joe Swail	11919	1960	805	920	575	805	1150	6215	18134
40	▲5	(Scotland) Marcus Campbell	8663	1960	1960	720	1400	630	2800	9470	18133
41	▲8	(England) Tom Ford	8313	455	1260	2240	1400	1610	2800	9765	18078
42	▼9	(England) Anthony Hamilton	10913	1610	630	2240	1150	630	900	7160	18073
43	▲3	(England) Martin Gould	10232	1610	630	720	450	630	3800	7840	18072
44	▼2	(England) Adrian Gunnell	7950	1610	1610	1840	450	1610	2300	9420	17370
45	▼11	(Wales) Dominic Dale	9307	1610	1610	1840	1400	630	900	7990	17297
46	▼5	(Scotland) Alan McManus	9863	630	630	720	1150	1610	2300	7040	16903
47	▼16	(Republic of Ireland) Fergal O'Brien	8082	805	805	920	1400	1960	2800	8690	16772
48	▼13	(England) Ian McCulloch	8769	630	1960	720	1150	630	2300	7390	16159
49	▲12	(England) Rod Lawler	7870	1260	1610	520	325	1960	2300	7975	15845
50	▲14	(England) Peter Lines	7150	1260	1610	4000	325	455	650	8300	15450
51	▲17	(England) Matthew Selt	6825	1960	1960	1440	900	910	1300	8470	15295
52	▼16	(Republic of Ireland) Michael Judge	8257	630	630	1840	1400	1610	900	7010	15267
53	▼3	(England) Andy Hicks	9932	455	455	1440	900	1260	650	5160	15092
54	New entry	(Malta) Tony Drago	5850 (Note: Starter points given to new players on the tour.)	1260	1260	1440	1400	1960	1800	9120	14970
55	▼4	(England) David Gilbert	7975	1610	1610	520	900	1260	650	6550	14525
56	▼8	(England) Jimmy Michie	8025	630	630	1840	450	630	2300	6480	14505
57	▼5	(England) Barry Pinches	6395	455	2660	520	1150	1260	1800	7845	14240
58	▼1	(England) Mark Joyce	6438	455	1960	1440	325	1260	2300	7740	14178
59	▼1	(Republic of Ireland) David Morris	7407	455	1610	520	900	455	2300	6240	13647
60	▼4	(England) Jimmy White	8250	1260	455	0	900	455	1800	4870	13120
61	▲2	(Republic of Ireland) Joe Delaney	7282	1260	455	1440	325	455	1800	5735	13017
62	New entry	(Belgium) Bjorn Haneveer	5850	910	910	320	900	1960	1800	6800	12650
63	New entry	(England) Jimmy Robertson	5850	1610	280	1440	650	1260	1300	6540	12390
64	▼10	(Wales) Paul Davies	7438	455	1260	520	325	455	1800	4815	12253
65	▼12	(England) John Parrott	7400	455	1260	1440	325	455	650	4585	11985
66	▲6	(England) Simon Bedford	6200	1610	910	1440	200	280	1300	5740	11940
67	▼7	(China) Jin Long	7888	455	455	520	325	455	1800	4010	11898
68	New entry	(Thailand) James Wattana	5850	280	280	1040	650	1960	1800	6010	11860
69		(England) Matthew Couch	6750	1260	910	1040	200	1260	400	5070	11820
70	▲3	(Northern Ireland) Patrick Wallace	5875	1610	1260	1040	650	910	400	5870	11745
71	New entry	(China) Zhang Anda	5850	280	1260	320	900	280	2800	5840	11690
72	New entry	(England) Joe Jogia	5850	1260	910	320	650	1260	1300	5700	11550
73	New entry	(Wales) Michael White	5850	1260	910	1840	200	910	400	5520	11370
74	New entry	(England) Ben Woollaston	5850	910	280	1440	200	910	1300	5040	10890
75	New entry	(China) Xiao Guodong	5850	910	280	1040	900	1260	400	4790	10640
76	New entry	(England) Sam Baird	5850	280	280	1040	200	1610	1300	4710	10560
77	New entry	(England) Craig Steadman	5850	910	280	1840	900	280	400	4610	10460
78	New entry	(Thailand) Thepchaiya Un-Nooh	5850	280	910	1840	900	280	400	4610	10460
79	▼14	(England) David Gray	5320	280	910	320	200	910	1800	4420	9740
80	▼12	(England) Lee Spick	6625	1610	280	320	200	280	400	3090	9715
81	▼10	(China) Li Hang	6250	0	1260	320	1150	280	400	3410	9660
82	▼23	(China) Liu Song	4895	455	1260	520	1400	455	650	4740	9635
83	▼13	(Wales) Daniel Wells	6600	910	910	320	200	280	400	3020	9620
84	New entry	(Thailand) Noppadol Sangnil	5850	1260	280	320	200	280	1300	3640	9490
85	New entry	(Republic of Ireland) David Hogan	5850	280	280	1040	200	280	1300	3380	9230
86	▼11	(Thailand) Atthasit Mahitthi	5850	280	280	1440	650	280	400	3330	9180
87	New entry	(Republic of Ireland) Brendan O'Donoghue	5850	910	280	320	200	280	1300	3290	9140
88	New entry	(Scotland) Mark Boyle	5850	280	910	320	0	280	1300	3090	8940
89	New entry	(China) Mei Xiwen	5850	0	280	320	200	910	1300	3010	8860
90	New entry	(Northern Ireland) Jordan Brown	5850	280	280	1040	650	280	400	2930	8780
91	New entry	(England) Stephen Rowlings	5850	280	910	320	650	280	400	2840	8690
92	New entry	(England) Chris Norbury	5850	280	280	320	200	1260	400	2740	8590
93	▼31	(England) David Roe	4320	455	455	520	325	455	1800	4010	8330
94	New entry	(England) Lee Page	5850	280	280	320	650	280	400	2210	8060
95	▼29	(Wales) Ian Preece	5645	280	280	320	200	910	400	2390	8035
96	▼22	(England) Andrew Norman	5613	280	910	320	200	280	400	2390	8003
