= 2008–09 snooker world ranking points =

Preceded by 2007/2008	2008/2009	Succeeded by 2009/2010

Snooker world ranking points 2008/2009: The official world ranking points for the 96 professional snooker players in the 2008–09 season are listed below. The total points from the seasons 2007–08 and 2008–09 were used to determine the ranking for the season 2009/2010.

== Ranking points ==
No.	Ch	Player	Points 07/08	NIT	SM	GP	BC	UK	WO	CO	WSC	Points 08/09	Total
1		(England) Ronnie O'Sullivan	29700	5000	4000	3125	700	2850	1900	2500	3800	23875	53575
2		(Scotland) Stephen Maguire	25975	2500	3200	875	2500	4800	2500	700	5000	22075	48050
3		(England) Shaun Murphy	23700	700	700	875	700	7500	2500	2500	8000	23475	47175
4	▲1	(Scotland) John Higgins	14825	3200	1900	6250	0	3750	1900	4000	10000	31000	45825
5	▲2	(England) Ali Carter	18425	3200	700	4000	700	4800	5000	1900	3800	24100	42525
6	▲2	(Wales) Ryan Day	19425	1900	2500	5000	1900	1050	700	3200	5000	21250	40675
7	▼3	(England) Mark Selby	20050	1900	3200	2375	0	1050	2500	1900	5000	17925	37975
8	▲6	(Hong Kong) Marco Fu	18075	700	2500	2375	700	6000	2500	700	3800	19275	37350
9	▲1	(Australia) Neil Robertson	12400	700	1900	875	5000	2850	3200	1900	6400	22825	35225
10	▼4	(Scotland) Stephen Hendry	16900	700	700	2375	3200	1050	700	2500	5000	16225	33125
11	▲5	(Northern Ireland) Mark Allen	15075	2500	575	875	3200	2850	700	700	6400	17800	32875
12		(England) Joe Perry	18250	1900	1900	2375	1900	3750	700	700	1400	14625	32875
13	▼2	(China) Ding Junhui	15869	700	700	3125	0	2850	1900	700	3800	13775	29644
14	▼5	(England) Peter Ebdon	14975	700	700	2375	700	2850	700	5000	1400	14425	29400
15	▲7	(Wales) Mark Williams	15100	1900	2500	719	575	3750	575	1400	2800	14219	29319
16	▼1	(England) Mark King	13675	700	1900	875	700	2850	1900	1900	3800	14625	28300
17	▲10	(England) Barry Hawkins	12975	2500	1400	1750	2500	2100	575	575	2800	14200	27175
18	▲1	(England) Jamie Cope	12869	1400	1900	3125	700	863	575	1400	3800	13763	26632
19	▲9	(England) Dave Harold	12244	4000	1900	1750	1400	863	1400	1900	1150	14363	26607
20	▲15	(England) Ricky Walden	10225	1150	5000	1750	1400	675	1150	1900	2800	15825	26050
21		(England) Stuart Bingham	14775	575	1900	719	1400	2100	575	575	2800	10644	25419
22	▼2	(Northern Ireland) Joe Swail	12975	575	575	719	575	2100	4000	575	2800	11919	24894
23	▲6	(England) Steve Davis	9569	575	2500	3125	1900	2100	1400	575	2800	14975	24544
24	▲10	(England) Michael Holt	8950	1400	1150	2375	1900	2100	1150	1400	2800	14275	23225
25	▲1	(England) Stephen Lee	9569	1900	575	719	1900	3750	575	1400	2800	13619	23188
26	▼9	(Wales) Matthew Stevens	10463	575	1400	719	4000	2850	1400	575	1150	12669	23132
27	▲13	(China) Liang Wenbo	10500	1900	1400	1750	1150	1725	1150	450	2800	12325	22825
28	▼15	(Scotland) Graeme Dott	8469	700	700	875	700	2850	1900	2500	3800	14025	22494
29	▼6	(England) Nigel Bond	13275	575	575	719	575	863	575	1400	3800	9082	22357
30	▲10	(England) Judd Trump	7701	1150	1400	4000	1400	2100	450	1400	2300	14200	21901
31	▼7	(Republic of Ireland) Fergal O'Brien	12713	575	1400	719	575	863	1400	1400	1150	8082	20795
32	▲1	(Northern Ireland) Gerard Greene	10238	1150	1150	563	575	1725	1150	1400	2800	10513	20751
33	▼2	(England) Anthony Hamilton	9775	575	1400	1750	575	863	3200	1400	1150	10913	20688
34	▼2	(Wales) Dominic Dale	11313	1400	700	719	2500	863	1400	575	1150	9307	20620
35	▼10	(England) Ian McCulloch	10494	2500	575	719	575	2100	575	575	1150	8769	19263
36	▼6	(Republic of Ireland) Michael Judge	10750	575	575	719	1900	863	1900	575	1150	8257	19007
37	▲25	(England) Stuart Pettman	7163	1400	1400	407	900	1350	1150	3200	1800	11607	18770
38	▲9	(England) Mike Dunn	8451	1150	1150	563	1900	675	1400	1150	2300	10288	18739
39	▲5	(England) Rory McLeod	7925	1400	450	1438	1150	2100	450	450	2800	10238	18163
40	▲5	(Scotland) Jamie Burnett	6638	450	1150	1750	450	2100	1400	1150	2800	11250	17888
41	▼4	(Scotland) Alan McManus	7938	1900	1150	1438	450	1725	450	450	2300	9863	17801
42	▼6	(England) Adrian Gunnell	9550	1150	450	2375	450	1725	450	450	900	7950	17500
43	▼5	(England) Andrew Higginson	6888	1400	450	1750	450	2100	450	1150	2800	10550	17438
44	▼26	(Republic of Ireland) Ken Doherty	9569	1400	575	719	700	2100	575	575	1150	7794	17363
45	▼1	(Scotland) Marcus Campbell	8200	1150	450	1438	1400	1725	1150	450	900	8663	16863
46	▲17	(England) Martin Gould	6413	900	325	407	900	2100	1900	900	2800	10232	16645
47	▲11	(England) Mark Davis	6713	1900	900	1125	1400	2100	325	325	1800	9875	16588
48	▼2	(England) Jimmy Michie	7975	450	450	1750	1150	1725	450	1150	900	8025	16000
49	▼1	(England) Tom Ford	7650	450	1400	1438	450	675	1150	450	2300	8313	15963
50	▲6	(England) Andy Hicks	5900	900	1900	407	1150	1725	1150	900	1800	9932	15832
51	▼8	(England) David Gilbert	7650	1400	450	1750	450	675	1900	450	900	7975	15625
52	▼2	(England) Barry Pinches	9175	900	325	407	1900	488	1400	325	650	6395	15570
53	▼14	(England) John Parrott	7825	450	0	2375	1150	675	450	1400	900	7400	15225
54	▲1	(Wales) Paul Davies	6888	325	325	1125	1150	488	1400	325	2300	7438	14326
55	▼4	(England) Robert Milkins	6250	325	325	407	2500	1350	900	1400	650	7857	14107
56	▲9	(England) Jimmy White	5788	1150	1400	1125	325	1350	1400	200	1300	8250	14038
57	▲2	(England) Mark Joyce	7563	900	1150	1125	900	488	900	325	650	6438	14001
58	▲6	(Republic of Ireland) David Morris	6038	325	1150	407	1150	1350	900	325	1800	7407	13445
59	▲2	(China) Liu Song	8475	900	325	407	325	488	325	325	1800	4895	13370
60	New entry	(China) Jin Long	5088 (Note: Starter points given to new players on the tour.)	200	650	1438	650	1350	650	1150	1800	7888	12976
61	▼1	(England) Rod Lawler	4913	900	1150	407	1400	488	325	1400	1800	7870	12783
62	▼10	(England) David Roe	8300	900	325	407	325	488	900	325	650	4320	12620
63	▼2	(Republic of Ireland) Joe Delaney	5276	900	325	407	900	1725	900	325	1800	7282	12558
64	New entry	(England) Peter Lines	5088	650	650	1125	1150	975	650	650	1300	7150	12238
65	▼16	(England) David Gray	6888	1150	450	407	450	488	325	1400	650	5320	12208
66	▼11	(Wales) Ian Preece	6525	900	1150	407	325	488	1400	325	650	5645	12170
67	▲1	(England) Matthew Selt	5288	650	900	1125	650	1350	650	200	1300	6825	12113
68	▼1	(England) Lee Spick	5350	650	900	250	325	1350	650	200	2300	6625	11975
69	New entry	(England) Matthew Couch	5088	650	900	250	900	1350	200	200	2300	6750	11838
70	New entry	(Wales) Daniel Wells	5088	650	650	250	900	300	900	650	2300	6600	11688
71	New entry	(China) Li Hang	5088	900	650	1125	650	975	900	650	400	6250	11338
72	New entry	(England) Simon Bedford	5088	650	650	1750	200	300	200	650	1800	6200	11288
73	▼4	(Northern Ireland) Patrick Wallace	5275	650	200	250	200	975	650	1150	1800	5875	11150
74	▼20	(England) Andrew Norman	5513	900	900	1125	325	488	325	900	650	5613	11126
75	New entry	(Thailand) Atthasit Mahitthi	5088	200	900	1125	1150	975	200	900	400	5850	10938
76	▼5	(Scotland) James McBain	5150	650	650	813	200	300	200	1150	1300	5263	10413
77	▼7	(Republic of Ireland) Rodney Goggins	5163	650	200	250	650	1350	650	200	1300	5250	10413
78	New entry	(Wales) Jamie Jones	5088	650	200	250	650	1350	200	200	1800	5300	10388
79	New entry	(England) Stephen Craigie	5088	200	900	813	650	300	900	650	400	4813	9901
80	New entry	(England) Kuldesh Johal	5088	650	650	250	200	1350	200	900	400	4600	9688
81	New entry	(Republic of Ireland) Vincent Muldoon	5088	200	650	1125	900	300	650	200	400	4425	9513
82	▼10	(Thailand) Supoj Saenla	5088	200	200	1125	200	975	200	200	1300	4400	9488
83	New entry	(England) Andy Lee	5088	200	900	1125	200	300	200	900	400	4225	9313
84	New entry	(India) Aditya Mehta	5088	200	200	1125	200	300	900	900	400	4225	9313
85	New entry	(Wales) Andrew Pagett	5088	650	200	250	650	300	200	650	1300	4200	9288
86	New entry	(England) Lewis Roberts	5088	200	200	250	650	300	650	650	1300	4200	9288
87	▼21	(Scotland) Scott MacKenzie	5413	0	200	813	325	975	200	900	400	3813	9226
88	New entry	(Scotland) Robert Stephen	5088	200	900	250	900	300	200	900	400	4050	9138
89	New entry	(England) Paul Davison	5088	200	650	250	650	975	650	200	400	3975	9063
90	New entry	(England) Wayne Cooper	5088	650	200	250	200	300	650	200	1300	3750	8838
91	New entry	(Netherlands) Stefan Mazrocis	5088	200	200	813	900	300	650	200	400	3263	8751
92	▼19	(China) Liu Chuang	4650	900	200	250	200	1725	200	200	400	4075	8725
93	New entry	(England) David Grace	5088	200	200	1125	200	300	200	200	400	2825	7913
94	New entry	(England) Michael Georgiou	5088	200	200	250	200	300	200	200	400	1950	7038
95	New entry	(New Zealand) Chris McBreen	5088	200	200	250	200	300	200	200	400	1950	7038
96	New entry	(Northern Ireland) Declan Hughes	5088	200	200	250	0	300	0	200	400	1550	6638
