= 2011 Welsh Open (snooker) =

2011 Wyldecrest Park Homes Welsh Open

Tournament information
- Dates: 14–20 February 2011
- Venue: Newport Centre
- City: Newport
- Country: Wales
- Organisation: World Snooker
- Format: Ranking event
- Total prize fund: £201,500
- Winner's share: £30,000
- Highest break: Stephen Hendry (SCO) (147)

Final
- Champion: John Higgins (SCO)
- Runner-up: Stephen Maguire (SCO)
- Score: 9–6

The 2011 Welsh Open (officially the 2011 Wyldecrest Park Homes Welsh Open) was a professional ranking snooker tournament that took place between 14 and 20 February 2011 at the Newport Centre in Newport, Wales. This was the first time that the Welsh Open was sponsored by Wyldecrest Park Homes.

Stephen Hendry made the 77th official maximum break during his second round match against Stephen Maguire. This was Hendry's 10th 147 break, and with this equalled the record for most maximums with Ronnie O'Sullivan, and became the oldest player to compile a maximum break at the age of 42 years and 35 days.

John Higgins defended his title, which he won in 2010, after defeating Maguire 9–6 in the final. This was the first All-Scottish final since the 2005 Malta Cup final between Hendry and Graeme Dott.

== Prize fund ==
The breakdown of prize money for this year is shown below:

- Winner: £30,000
- Runner-Up: £15,000
- Semi-final: £7,500
- Quarter-final: £5,600
- Last 16: £4,000
- Last 32: £2,500
- Last 48: £1,600
- Last 64: £1,250
- Stage one highest break: £500
- Stage two highest break: £1,000
- Total: £201,500

== Main draw ==
Last 32; Best of 7 frames
1 | (Scotland) John Higgins | 4
(England) Jack Lisowski | 3
15 | (England) Ricky Walden | 3
(England) Dave Harold | 4
9 | (England) Ronnie O'Sullivan | 2
(Wales) Ryan Day | 4
5 | (England) Shaun Murphy | 0
(Wales) Matthew Stevens | 4
7 | (England) Ali Carter | 4
(England) Barry Hawkins | 3
12 | (England) Peter Ebdon | 4
(Wales) Dominic Dale | 2
11 | (Northern Ireland) Mark Allen | 4
(England) Rod Lawler | 1
4 | (China) Ding Junhui | 4
(Scotland) Marcus Campbell | 3
3 | (Wales) Mark Williams | 4
(Hong Kong) Marco Fu | 0
13 | (England) Jamie Cope | 4
(England) Rory McLeod | 3
14 | (Scotland) Stephen Hendry | 4
(England) Joe Perry | 0
8 | (Scotland) Stephen Maguire | 4
(Northern Ireland) Gerard Greene | 2
6 | (England) Mark Selby | 4
(England) Stuart Bingham | 3
16 | (England) Mark King | 4
(England) Michael Holt | 1
10 | (Scotland) Graeme Dott | 4
(Scotland) Jamie Burnett | 1
2 | (Australia) Neil Robertson | 4
(England) Nigel Bond | 2

Last 16; Best of 7 frames
1 | (Scotland) John Higgins | 4
(England) Dave Harold | 1
(Wales) Ryan Day | 3
(Wales) Matthew Stevens | 4
7 | (England) Ali Carter | 4
12 | (England) Peter Ebdon | 1
11 | (Northern Ireland) Mark Allen | 3
4 | (China) Ding Junhui | 4
3 | (Wales) Mark Williams | 4
13 | (England) Jamie Cope | 0
14 | (Scotland) Stephen Hendry | 2
8 | (Scotland) Stephen Maguire | 4
6 | (England) Mark Selby | 4
16 | (England) Mark King | 2
10 | (Scotland) Graeme Dott | 4
2 | (Australia) Neil Robertson | 1

Quarter-finals; Best of 9 frames
1 | (Scotland) John Higgins | 5
(Wales) Matthew Stevens | 3
7 | (England) Ali Carter | 5
4 | (China) Ding Junhui | 2
3 | (Wales) Mark Williams | 3
8 | (Scotland) Stephen Maguire | 5
6 | (England) Mark Selby | 5
10 | (Scotland) Graeme Dott | 3

Semi-finals; Best of 11 frames
1 | (Scotland) John Higgins | 6
7 | (England) Ali Carter | 2
8 | (Scotland) Stephen Maguire | 6
6 | (England) Mark Selby | 5

Final; Best of 17 frames
1 | (Scotland) John Higgins | 9
8 | (Scotland) Stephen Maguire | 6

== Final ==
Final: Best of 17 frames. Referee: Eirian Williams. Newport Centre, Newport, Wales, 20 February 2011.
| John Higgins (1); Scotland | 9–6 | Stephen Maguire (8); Scotland |
Afternoon: 0–83 (59), 32–71 (53), 121–1 (120), 0–101 (89), 72–58 (72, 58), 0–88 (76), 40–71, 71–18 (70); Evening: 55–49, 64–48 (63), 75–56, 75–0 (75), 0–75 (75), 127–1 (54, 66), 80–50 (72)
| 120 | Highest break | 89 |
| 1 | Century breaks | 0 |
| 8 | 50+ breaks | 6 |

== Qualifying ==
These matches took place between 8 and 11 February 2011 at the World Snooker Academy, Sheffield, England.

Round 1 Best of 7 frames
(England) Liam Highfield | 4
(Republic of Ireland) Joe Delaney | 2
(Wales) Andrew Pagett | 1
(England) Kuldesh Johal | 4
(Scotland) James McBain | 4
(England) Justin Astley | 0
(Republic of Ireland) David Morris | 4
(Thailand) Thanawat Thirapongpaiboon | 2
(Brazil) Igor Figueiredo | w/o
(Wales) Paul Davies | w/d
(China) Liu Chuang | 4
(China) Zhang Anda | 2
(England) David Gilbert | 2
(Wales) Jak Jones | 4
(Republic of Ireland) Michael Judge | 4
(England) Reanne Evans | 1
(Wales) Michael White | 4
(England) Adam Wicheard | 2
(England) Jimmy Michie | w/d
(Norway) Kurt Maflin | w/o
(England) Kyren Wilson | 0
(England) Jamie O'Neill | 4
(England) Ben Woollaston | 4
(China) Liu Song | 0
(England) Paul Davison | 4
(Northern Ireland) Dermot McGlinchey | 2
(China) Xiao Guodong | 4
(Thailand) Issara Kachaiwong | 1
(Thailand) James Wattana | 3
(England) Simon Bedford | 4
(England) Matthew Couch | 2
(Thailand) Noppon Saengkham | 4

Round 2 Best of 7 frames
(England) Jack Lisowski | 4
(England) Liam Highfield | 1
(England) Dave Harold | 4
(England) Kuldesh Johal | 3
(England) Jimmy White | 4
(Scotland) James McBain | 0
(Belgium) Bjorn Haneveer | 1
(Republic of Ireland) David Morris | 4
(England) Andy Hicks | 4
(Brazil) Igor Figueiredo | 1
(Scotland) Anthony McGill | 3
(China) Liu Chuang | 4
(England) Rod Lawler | 4
(Wales) Jak Jones | 2
(England) Joe Jogia | 4
(Republic of Ireland) Michael Judge | 3
(Wales) Jamie Jones | 4
(Wales) Michael White | 2
(England) Alfie Burden | 4
(Norway) Kurt Maflin | 1
(England) Matthew Selt | 4
(England) Jamie O'Neill | 3
(England) Ian McCulloch | 4
(England) Ben Woollaston | 2
(England) Stuart Pettman | 0
(England) Paul Davison | 4
(Northern Ireland) Patrick Wallace | 3
(China) Xiao Guodong | 4
(England) Jimmy Robertson | 4
(England) Simon Bedford | 2
(England) Adrian Gunnell | 0
(Thailand) Noppon Saengkham | 4

Round 3 Best of 7 frames
(Republic of Ireland) Fergal O'Brien | 0
(England) Jack Lisowski | 4
(England) Mike Dunn | 3
(England) Dave Harold | 4
(England) Robert Milkins | 1
(England) Jimmy White | 4
(England) Anthony Hamilton | 4
(Republic of Ireland) David Morris | 3
(England) Barry Pinches | 2
(England) Andy Hicks | 4
(Wales) Dominic Dale | 4
(China) Liu Chuang | 1
(England) Mark Joyce | 3
(England) Rod Lawler | 4
(England) Steve Davis | 3
(England) Joe Jogia | 4
(Northern Ireland) Joe Swail | 4
(Wales) Jamie Jones | 1
(England) Rory McLeod | 4
(England) Alfie Burden | 3
(Malta) Tony Drago | 4
(England) Matthew Selt | 2
(Scotland) Alan McManus | 2
(England) Ian McCulloch | 4
(England) Peter Lines | 2
(England) Paul Davison | 4
(England) Michael Holt | 4
(China) Xiao Guodong | 2
(Scotland) Jamie Burnett | 4
(England) Jimmy Robertson | 0
(England) Nigel Bond | 4
(Thailand) Noppon Saengkham | 1

Round 4 Best of 7 frames
(England) Martin Gould | 3
(England) Jack Lisowski | 4
(China) Liang Wenbo | 0
(England) Dave Harold | 4
(Wales) Ryan Day (Note: Matches were held over and played in Newport.) | 4
(England) Jimmy White | 0
(Wales) Matthew Stevens | 4
(England) Anthony Hamilton | 2
(England) Barry Hawkins | 4
(England) Andy Hicks | 0
(England) Mark Davis | 2
(Wales) Dominic Dale | 4
(England) Judd Trump | 1
(England) Rod Lawler | 4
(Scotland) Marcus Campbell | 4
(England) Joe Jogia | 0
(Hong Kong) Marco Fu | 4
(Northern Ireland) Joe Swail | 1
(England) Stephen Lee | 1
(England) Rory McLeod | 4
(England) Joe Perry | 4
(Malta) Tony Drago | 2
(Northern Ireland) Gerard Greene | 4
(England) Ian McCulloch | 0
(England) Stuart Bingham | 4
(England) Paul Davison | 0
(England) Andrew Higginson | 1
(England) Michael Holt | 4
(England) Tom Ford | 0
(Scotland) Jamie Burnett | 4
(Republic of Ireland) Ken Doherty | 2
(England) Nigel Bond | 4

== Century breaks ==
=== Qualifying stage centuries ===
- 143 – Barry Hawkins
- 137 – James McBain
- 137 – Patrick Wallace
- 128 – Anthony Hamilton
- 125 – Ian McCulloch
- 124 – David Gilbert
- 124, 101, 100 – Jack Lisowski
- 124 – Xiao Guodong
- 119 – Jamie Jones
- 111 – Joe Jogia
- 110 – Jimmy Robertson
- 107, 103 – Jimmy White
- 105 – Kuldesh Johal
- 103 – Anthony McGill
- 103 – Dominic Dale
- 102 – Joe Perry
- 100 – Jamie Burnett

=== Televised stage centuries ===
- 147 – Stephen Hendry
- 139 – Dominic Dale
- 137, 129, 109, 105 – Stephen Maguire
- 136, 132, 120 – John Higgins
- 133 – Matthew Stevens
- 130 – Neil Robertson
- 125, 113, 109, 102 – Ryan Day
- 125, 103 – Ding Junhui
- 120, 108, 100 – Mark Williams
- 120 – Jamie Cope
- 118 – Ali Carter
- 115 – Peter Ebdon
- 102 – Nigel Bond
- 102 – Mark Selby
- 100 – Ronnie O'Sullivan
