= Asian Tour 2013/2014 – Event 3 =

Asian Tour 2013/2014 Event 3
Tournament information
- Dates: 20–24 October 2013
- Venue: Guanhua Grand Hotel
- City: Zhengzhou
- Country: China
- Organisation: World Snooker
- Format: Minor-ranking event
- Total prize fund: £50,000
- Winner's share: £10,000
- Highest break: Gary Wilson (ENG) (136)

Final
- Champion: Liang Wenbo (CHN)
- Runner-up: Lyu Haotian (CHN)
- Score: 4–0

The Asian Tour 2013/2014 – Event 3 (also known as the 2013 Zhengzhou Open) was a professional minor-ranking snooker tournament that took place between 20 and 24 October 2013 at the Guanhua Grand Hotel in Zhengzhou, China.

Liang Wenbo won his first title carrying ranking points by defeating Lyu Haotian 4–0 in the final.

== Prize fund and ranking points ==
The breakdown of prize money and ranking points of the event is shown below:

	Prize fund	Ranking points^{1}
Winner	£10,000	2,000
Runner-up	£5,000	1,600
Semi-finalist	£2,500	1,280
Quarter-finalist	£1,500	1,000
Last 16	£1,000	760
Last 32	£600	560
Last 64	£200	360
Total	£50,000	–

- ^{1} Only professional players can earn ranking points.

== Main draw ==
=== Top half ===
==== Section 1 ====
Last 128; Best of 7 frames
(China) Zhang Yong	4
(China) Wang Shi	1
(China) Chen Feilong	4
(China) Pang Junxu	0
(China) Li Yuan	4
(China) Yuan Sijun	1
(China) Lin Shuai	4
(China) Liu Yiqi	0
(England) Gary Wilson	4
(China) Ji Zhijun	2
(England) Barry Pinches	4
(China) Yao Pengcheng	0

Last 64; Best of 7 frames
(China) Ju Reti	4
(China) Zhang Yong	0
(China) Chen Feilong	0
(China) Li Yuan	4
(China) Lin Shuai	0
(Scotland) Alan McManus	4
(England) Gary Wilson	4
(England) Barry Pinches	1

Last 32; Best of 7 frames
(China) Ju Reti	3
(China) Li Yuan	4
(Scotland) Alan McManus	0
(England) Gary Wilson	4

Last 16; Best of 7 frames
(China) Li Yuan	1
(England) Gary Wilson	4

==== Section 2 ====
Last 128; Best of 7 frames
(China) Hu Hao	w/o
(China) Long Yun	n/s
(China) Chen Ruifu	1
(China) Yong Fan	4
(China) Jin Long	4
(China) Xiong Jun	0
(China) Zhu Yinghui	4
(China) Yu Haitao	1
(China) Wang Heng	3
(China) Shan Xianshu	4
(Scotland) John Higgins	4
(China) Liu Jiaming	0
(Scotland) Anthony McGill	4
(China) Yang Qingtian	0

Last 64; Best of 7 frames
(China) Hu Hao	4
(China) Yong Fan	1
(China) Jin Long	4
(China) Zhu Yinghui	0
(China) Shan Xianshu	0
(Scotland) John Higgins	4
(China) Yan Bingtao	3
(Scotland) Anthony McGill	4

Last 32; Best of 7 frames
(China) Hu Hao	4
(China) Jin Long	2
(Scotland) John Higgins	1
(Scotland) Anthony McGill	4

Last 16; Best of 7 frames
(China) Hu Hao	0
(Scotland) Anthony McGill	4

==== Section 3 ====
Last 128; Best of 7 frames
(Qatar) Ahmed Saif	w/d
(China) Li Zhen	w/o
(China) Wang Yuchen	4
(China) Ma Yinzhu	1
(China) Li Yan	4
(China) Zhang Yadong	2
(China) Guan Zhen	4
(China) Feng Zeyuan	1
(China) Xu Xinjian	4
(China) Zhou Jun	2

Last 64; Best of 7 frames
(China) Li Zhen	1
(China) Wang Yuchen	4
(China) Fang Xiongman	0
(China) Liu Chuang	4
(China) Li Yan	1
(China) Tian Pengfei	4
(China) Guan Zhen	4
(China) Xu Xinjian	0

Last 32; Best of 7 frames
(China) Wang Yuchen	1
(China) Liu Chuang	4
(China) Tian Pengfei	2
(China) Guan Zhen	4

Last 16; Best of 7 frames
(China) Liu Chuang	4
(China) Guan Zhen	1

==== Section 4 ====
Last 128; Best of 7 frames
(China) Ma Tingpeng	4
(China) Zhang Yi	0
(England) Ben Woollaston	4
(China) Xu Si	0
(China) Lu Ning	w/o
(China) Xiao Long	n/s
(China) Zhao Xintong	4
(China) Zhang Hanxuan	1
(China) Li Hang	4
(China) Zhang Zihao	2

Last 64; Best of 7 frames
(China) Rouzi Maimaiti	4
(China) Ma Tingpeng	3
(England) Ben Woollaston	4
(China) Lu Ning	1
(China) Yu Delu	0
(China) Zhao Xintong	4
(China) Liang Wenbo	4
(China) Li Hang	3

Last 32; Best of 7 frames
(China) Rouzi Maimaiti	4
(England) Ben Woollaston	2
(China) Zhao Xintong	0
(China) Liang Wenbo	4

Last 16; Best of 7 frames
(China) Rouzi Maimaiti	3
(China) Liang Wenbo	4

=== Bottom half ===
==== Section 5 ====
Last 128; Best of 7 frames
(China) Niu Zhuang	4
(China) Gao Le	1
(China) Wang Zepeng	4
(China) Sun Peng	2
(England) Rory McLeod	4
(China) Wang Yuanfan	3
(China) Zhang Yang	4
(China) Yang Gangxinfu	0
(China) Pan Weixing	4
(China) Sun Hongrui	2

Last 64; Best of 7 frames
(Scotland) Scott Donaldson	4
(China) Niu Zhuang	0
(China) Wang Zepeng	1
(China) Lu Chenwei	4
(England) Rory McLeod	2
(China) Xiao Guodong	4
(China) Zhang Yang	2
(China) Pan Weixing	4

Last 32; Best of 7 frames
(Scotland) Scott Donaldson	4
(China) Lu Chenwei	1
(China) Xiao Guodong	4
(China) Pan Weixing	1

Last 16; Best of 7 frames
(Scotland) Scott Donaldson	1
(China) Xiao Guodong	4

==== Section 6 ====
Last 128; Best of 7 frames
(China) Cai Jianzhong	3
(China) Feng Yu	4
(China) Ma Chunmao	4
(China) Zhang Xinwei	1
(China) Luo Honghao	4
(China) Fan Zhengyi	2
(China) Lin Yongzhi	1
(China) Chen Zifan	4
(England) Alex Davies	1
(China) Qiu Yalong	4
(China) Zou Junhai	4
(China) Liu Ying	2

Last 64; Best of 7 frames
(China) Feng Yu	4
(China) Tang	2
(China) Ma Chunmao	1
(China) Luo Honghao	4
(China) Da Hailin	1
(China) Chen Zifan	4
(China) Qiu Yalong	4
(China) Zou Junhai	1

Last 32; Best of 7 frames
(China) Feng Yu	1
(China) Luo Honghao	4
(China) Chen Zifan	4
(China) Qiu Yalong	2

Last 16; Best of 7 frames
(China) Luo Honghao	1
(China) Chen Zifan	4

==== Section 7 ====
Last 128; Best of 7 frames
(Hong Kong) Au Chi-wai	4
(China) Chen Junhao	1
(China) Zhong Lin	4
(China) Li Wei	1
(Scotland) Ross Muir	4
(China) Wang Peng	0
(China) Cao Xinlong	4
(China) Li Weixue	3
(China) Chen Zhe	4
(China) Wang Linhan	3

Last 64; Best of 7 frames
(Hong Kong) Au Chi-wai	4
(China) Zhong Lin	1
(Scotland) Ross Muir	0
(China) Cao Yupeng	4
(China) Cao Xinlong	w/o
(China) Ding Junhui	w/d
(China) Zhou Yuelong	4
(China) Chen Zhe	1

Last 32; Best of 7 frames
(Hong Kong) Au Chi-wai	1
(China) Cao Yupeng	4
(China) Cao Xinlong	1
(China) Zhou Yuelong	4

Last 16; Best of 7 frames
(China) Cao Yupeng	0
(China) Zhou Yuelong	4

==== Section 8 ====
Last 128; Best of 7 frames
(China) Zhang Anda	4
(China) Wang Qianwei	0
(China) Lyu Haotian	4
(China) Li Yujin	3
(China) Shi Hanqing	w/d
(China) Huang Jiahao	w/o
(Scotland) Graeme Dott	4
(China) Zhou Xiao	0
(England) Stuart Bingham	4
(China) He Guoqiang	0
(China) Fang Fan	1
(China) Pa Ruke	4

Last 64; Best of 7 frames
(China) Zhang Anda	2
(China) Lyu Haotian	4
(China) Mei Xiwen	1
(China) Huang Jiahao	4
(Scotland) Graeme Dott	4
(England) Stuart Bingham	3
(China) Pa Ruke	4
(England) Mark Selby	3

Last 32; Best of 7 frames
(China) Lyu Haotian	4
(China) Huang Jiahao	1
(Scotland) Graeme Dott	4
(China) Pa Ruke	1

Last 16; Best of 7 frames
(China) Lyu Haotian	4
(Scotland) Graeme Dott	2

=== Finals ===
Quarter-finals; Best of 7 frames		Semi-finals; Best of 7 frames		Final; Best of 7 frames
(England) Gary Wilson	1
(Scotland) Anthony McGill	4	(Scotland) Anthony McGill	3
(China) Liu Chuang	2	(China) Liang Wenbo	4
(China) Liang Wenbo	4			(China) Liang Wenbo	4
(China) Xiao Guodong	4			(China) Lyu Haotian	0
(China) Chen Zifan	0	(China) Xiao Guodong	3
(China) Zhou Yuelong	1	(China) Lyu Haotian	4
(China) Lyu Haotian	4

== Century breaks ==
- 136, 123, 121, 117 – Gary Wilson
- 131 – Luo Honghao
- 129 – Zhang Anda
- 128, 113 – Stuart Bingham
- 126 – Tian Pengfei
- 124, 106 – John Higgins
- 120 – Zhou Yuelong
- 113 – Anthony McGill
- 109 – Xiao Guodong
- 106 – Li Yujin
- 104 – Liang Wenbo
- 103 – Mark Selby
- 100 – Lyu Haotian
- 100 – Mei Xiwen
- 100 – Qiu Yalong
