= Euro Players Tour Championship 2010/2011 – Event 2 =

Euro Players Tour Championship 2010/2011 Event 2
Tournament information
- Dates: 30 September – 3 October 2010
- Venue: Boudewijn Seapark
- City: Bruges
- Country: Belgium
- Organisation: World Snooker
- Format: Minor-ranking event
- Total prize fund: €50,000
- Winner's share: €10,000
- Highest break: Jamie Cope (ENG) (140)

Final
- Champion: Shaun Murphy (ENG)
- Runner-up: Matthew Couch (ENG)
- Score: 4–2

The Euro Players Tour Championship 2010/2011 – Event 2 was a professional minor-ranking snooker tournament that took place between 30 September–3 October 2010 at the Boudewijn Seapark in Bruges, Belgium.

Shaun Murphy won in the final 4–2 against Matthew Couch.

== Prize fund and ranking points ==
The breakdown of prize money and ranking points of the event is shown below:

	Prize fund	Ranking points^{1}
Winner	€10,000	2,000
Runner-up	€5,000	1,600
Semi-finalist	€2,500	1,280
Quarter-finalist	€1,400	1,000
Last 16	€1,000	760
Last 32	€500	560
Last 64	€200	360
Brugge Open Winner	€1,500^{2}	–
Brugge Open Runner-up	€500	–
Total	€50,000	–

- ^{1} Only professional players can earn ranking points.
- ^{2} Prize money earned from the Brugge Open competition does not qualify for inclusion in the Order of Merit.

== Main draw ==
=== Preliminary rounds ===
==== Round 1 ====
Best of 7 frames

(England) Christopher Henry	4–0	(Belgium) Jan Goossens
(Belgium) Kurt Vanoverberge	4–3	(Belgium) Alain Van Der Steen
(England) Michael Wild	1–4	(England) Nick Jennings

(England) Martin O'Donnell	4–0	(Belgium) Tim Van Gouberghen
(Belgium) Bert Van Tiggelen	0–4	(England) Craig Steadman
(Belgium) Guido Taloen	4–0	(Belgium) Kevin Van Den Broeck

==== Round 2 ====
Best of 7 frames

(Poland) Michał Zieliński	0–4	(England) Christopher Henry
(Belgium) Pascal Durnez	1–4	(England) David Grace
(England) Danny Douane	1–4	(Belgium) Kurt Vanoverberge
(Belgium) Laurens De Staelen	4–1	(Belgium) Kris Van Landeghem
(Belgium) Hans Blanckaert	4–3	(Belgium) Danny D'Hoore
(England) Oliver Brown	4–1	(Belgium) Dirk Coppens
(England) Andrew Norman	w/o–w/d	(England) Dane Hall
(Belgium) Erwin Goethals	1–4	(England) Nick Jennings
(Belgium) Tomasz Skalski	4–3	(Belgium) Mario Van Herk
(Belgium) Eddy Kindermans	1–4	(India) Aditya Mehta
(India) David Singh	4–3	(England) Martin O'Donnell
(England) Mitchell Mann	0–4	(England) Craig Steadman
(China) Chen Zhe	4–0	(Belgium) Gwen Engels
(Thailand) Suriya Suwannasingh	w/d–w/o	(Belgium) Luc Heirewegh
(Belgium) Pascal Raes	1–4	(England) James Welsh
(Belgium) Jürgen Van Roy	1–4	(England) Jamie Walker

(Poland) Adam Stefanow	4–1	(Poland) Krzysztof Wrobel
(Wales) Alex Taubman	2–4	(Belgium) Kevin Van Hove
(Belgium) Julius Grauls	1–4	(Belgium) Tino De Witte
(Belgium) Jean Pierre De Blaer	0–4	(England) Ian Burns
(Belgium) Peter Bullen	4–1	(Belgium) Olivier Coucke
(Netherlands) Jarl Hinfelaar	n/s–w/o	(England) Sam Harvey
(Belgium) Olivier Vandenbohede	3–4	(Denmark) Rune Kampe
(Belgium) Luca Brecel	4–0	(Germany) Ronni Beniesch
(Belgium) Lieven Vanthournout	2–4	(Belgium) Curd Persijn
(Netherlands) Mario Wehrmann	2–4	(Belgium) Yvan Van Velthoven
(Poland) Marcin Nitschke	4–0	(Belgium) Jürgen Vandenbossche
(Belgium) Pierre Dethier	4–3	(Belgium) Guido Taloen
(Netherlands) Maurice Le Duc	4–3	(Belgium) Rene Hemelsoet
(France) Yannick Poulain	4–0	(England) Tony Knowles
(Belgium) Gino Verheyde	0–4	(England) Robbie Williams
(Germany) Lasse Münstermann	4–0	(Belgium) Edwin Depoorter

=== Main rounds ===
==== Top half ====
===== Section 1 =====
Last 128; Best of 7 frames
(England) Barry Pinches	1
(Australia) Neil Robertson	4
(England) Jimmy White	4
(England) Christopher Henry	0
(England) Mark Joyce	4
(England) David Grace	2
(England) Shaun Murphy	4
(England) Kuldesh Johal	1
(England) Mark Davis	4
(Belgium) Kurt Vanoverberge	2
(England) Barry Hawkins	4
(England) Rod Lawler	2
(England) Jimmy Robertson	4
(Belgium) Laurens De Staelen	0
(England) Matthew Selt	4
(Belgium) Hans Blanckaert	2

Last 64; Best of 7 frames
(Australia) Neil Robertson	2
(England) Jimmy White	4
(England) Mark Joyce	1
(England) Shaun Murphy	4
(England) Mark Davis	1
(England) Barry Hawkins	4
(England) Jimmy Robertson	4
(England) Matthew Selt	0

Last 32; Best of 7 frames
(England) Jimmy White	2
(England) Shaun Murphy	4
(England) Barry Hawkins	0
(England) Jimmy Robertson	4

Last 16; Best of 7 frames
(England) Shaun Murphy	4
(England) Jimmy Robertson	0

===== Section 2 =====
Last 128; Best of 7 frames
(England) Liam Highfield	2
(Northern Ireland) Mark Allen	4
(England) Stephen Lee	4
(England) Oliver Brown	1
(England) Anthony Hamilton	w/o
(Norway) Kurt Maflin	w/d
(Belgium) Bjorn Haneveer	4
(England) Andrew Norman	3
(England) Andrew Higginson	4
(England) Nick Jennings	2
(England) Joe Jogia	4
(Belgium) Tomasz Skalski	0
(England) Alfie Burden	4
(Thailand) Noppon Saengkham	1
(Scotland) Anthony McGill	4
(India) Aditya Mehta	0

Last 64; Best of 7 frames
(Northern Ireland) Mark Allen	2
(England) Stephen Lee	4
(England) Anthony Hamilton	3
(Belgium) Bjorn Haneveer	4
(England) Andrew Higginson	4
(England) Joe Jogia	2
(England) Alfie Burden	4
(Scotland) Anthony McGill	0

Last 32; Best of 7 frames
(England) Stephen Lee	2
(Belgium) Bjorn Haneveer	4
(England) Andrew Higginson	3
(England) Alfie Burden	4

Last 16; Best of 7 frames
(Belgium) Bjorn Haneveer	4
(England) Alfie Burden	3

===== Section 3 =====
Last 128; Best of 7 frames
(Brazil) Igor Figueiredo	2
(India) David Singh	4
(Wales) Andrew Pagett	4
(England) Adam Wicheard	3
(China) Xiao Guodong	2
(China) Zhang Anda	4
(England) Martin Gould	4
(Scotland) Graeme Dott	1
(England) Ian Glover	1
(England) Craig Steadman	4
(England) Ronnie O'Sullivan	w/d
(China) Chen Zhe	w/o
(England) Jack Lisowski	4
(Belgium) Luc Heirewegh	0
(England) Peter Ebdon	4
(England) Michael Holt	3

Last 64; Best of 7 frames
(India) David Singh	4
(Wales) Andrew Pagett	0
(China) Zhang Anda	1
(England) Martin Gould	4
(England) Craig Steadman	3
(China) Chen Zhe	4
(England) Jack Lisowski	1
(England) Peter Ebdon	4

Last 32; Best of 7 frames
(India) David Singh	2
(England) Martin Gould	4
(China) Chen Zhe	3
(England) Peter Ebdon	4

Last 16; Best of 7 frames
(England) Martin Gould	4
(England) Peter Ebdon	3

===== Section 4 =====
Last 128; Best of 7 frames
(England) Paul Davison	1
(Scotland) Stephen Hendry	4
(England) Peter Lines	4
(Wales) Ryan Day	2
(England) Michael Wasley	3
(China) Ding Junhui	4
(Scotland) Stephen Maguire	4
(Northern Ireland) Dermot McGlinchey	2
(England) Andy Hicks	4
(England) Reanne Evans	0
(China) Liu Chuang	4
(England) James Welsh	0
(Wales) Mark Williams	4
(Republic of Ireland) Joe Delaney	2
(England) Nigel Bond	4
(England) Jamie Walker	1

Last 64; Best of 7 frames
(Scotland) Stephen Hendry	4
(England) Peter Lines	3
(China) Ding Junhui	4
(Scotland) Stephen Maguire	1
(England) Andy Hicks	1
(China) Liu Chuang	4
(Wales) Mark Williams	4
(England) Nigel Bond	1

Last 32; Best of 7 frames
(Scotland) Stephen Hendry	1
(China) Ding Junhui	4
(China) Liu Chuang	2
(Wales) Mark Williams	4

Last 16; Best of 7 frames
(China) Ding Junhui	3
(Wales) Mark Williams	4

==== Bottom half ====
===== Section 5 =====
Last 128; Best of 7 frames
(England) Judd Trump	4
(Wales) Jak Jones	0
(Scotland) Marcus Campbell	1
(England) Chris Norbury	4
(China) Liang Wenbo	4
(Poland) Adam Stefanow	1
(England) Kyren Wilson	3
(England) Jimmy Michie	4
(Malta) Tony Drago	2
(England) Ben Woollaston	4
(Wales) Dominic Dale	4
(Belgium) Kevin Van Hove	1
(England) Tom Ford	4
(Belgium) Tino De Witte	2
(Northern Ireland) Gerard Greene	4
(England) Ian Burns	1

Last 64; Best of 7 frames
(England) Judd Trump	4
(England) Chris Norbury	1
(China) Liang Wenbo	4
(England) Jimmy Michie	3
(England) Ben Woollaston	4
(Wales) Dominic Dale	2
(England) Tom Ford	4
(Northern Ireland) Gerard Greene	2

Last 32; Best of 7 frames
(England) Judd Trump	0
(China) Liang Wenbo	4
(England) Ben Woollaston	3
(England) Tom Ford	4

Last 16; Best of 7 frames
(China) Liang Wenbo	4
(England) Tom Ford	1

===== Section 6 =====
Last 128; Best of 7 frames
(Scotland) Alan McManus	w/o
(England) Stuart Pettman	w/d
(England) Stuart Bingham	4
(Belgium) Peter Bullen	1
(England) Ian McCulloch	4
(England) Sam Harvey	0
(England) Mike Dunn	1
(England) Robert Milkins	4
(England) Dave Harold	4
(Denmark) Rune Kampe	0
(Republic of Ireland) Fergal O'Brien	4
(Republic of Ireland) Ken Doherty	2
(Wales) Matthew Stevens	w/o
(England) Ali Carter	w/d
(Wales) Jamie Jones	4
(Belgium) Luca Brecel	3

Last 64; Best of 7 frames
(Scotland) Alan McManus	1
(England) Stuart Bingham	4
(England) Ian McCulloch	4
(England) Robert Milkins	1
(England) Dave Harold	3
(Republic of Ireland) Fergal O'Brien	4
(Wales) Matthew Stevens	4
(Wales) Jamie Jones	0

Last 32; Best of 7 frames
(England) Stuart Bingham	4
(England) Ian McCulloch	2
(Republic of Ireland) Fergal O'Brien	4
(Wales) Matthew Stevens	2

Last 16; Best of 7 frames
(England) Stuart Bingham	2
(Republic of Ireland) Fergal O'Brien	4

===== Section 7 =====
Last 128; Best of 7 frames
(Germany) Patrick Einsle	0
(Belgium) Curd Persijn	4
(England) Allan Taylor	2
(England) Matthew Couch	4
(Hong Kong) Marco Fu	4
(Northern Ireland) Patrick Wallace	0
(England) Adrian Gunnell	4
(Scotland) James McBain	0
(England) Steve Davis	3
(Republic of Ireland) David Morris	4
(Wales) Daniel Wells	4
(Republic of Ireland) Michael Judge	3
(England) Jamie Cope	4
(Belgium) Yvan Van Velthoven	2
(England) Rory McLeod	4
(Poland) Marcin Nitschke	2

Last 64; Best of 7 frames
(Belgium) Curd Persijn	1
(England) Matthew Couch	4
(Hong Kong) Marco Fu	3
(England) Adrian Gunnell	4
(Republic of Ireland) David Morris	1
(Wales) Daniel Wells	4
(England) Jamie Cope	4
(England) Rory McLeod	3

Last 32; Best of 7 frames
(England) Matthew Couch	4
(England) Adrian Gunnell	3
(Wales) Daniel Wells	4
(England) Jamie Cope	0

Last 16; Best of 7 frames
(England) Matthew Couch	4
(Wales) Daniel Wells	1

===== Section 8 =====
Last 128; Best of 7 frames
(England) Ricky Walden	4
(Thailand) Thanawat Thirapongpaiboon	1
(England) Justin Astley	4
(Belgium) Pierre Dethier	0
(Wales) Michael White	4
(Netherlands) Maurice Le Duc	0
(Northern Ireland) Joe Swail	3
(Thailand) James Wattana	4
(England) Mark King	4
(France) Yannick Poulain	0
(England) Joe Perry	4
(England) Robbie Williams	2
(China) Liu Song	4
(Germany) Lasse Münstermann	0
(England) Mark Selby	4
(England) Jamie O'Neill	1

Last 64; Best of 7 frames
(England) Ricky Walden	4
(England) Justin Astley	1
(Wales) Michael White	4
(Thailand) James Wattana	3
(England) Mark King	4
(England) Joe Perry	2
(China) Liu Song	1
(England) Mark Selby	4

Last 32; Best of 7 frames
(England) Ricky Walden	4
(Wales) Michael White	3
(England) Mark King	1
(England) Mark Selby	4

Last 16; Best of 7 frames
(England) Ricky Walden	4
(England) Mark Selby	1

==== Finals ====
Quarter-finals; Best of 7 frames		Semi-finals; Best of 7 frames		Final; Best of 7 frames
(England) Shaun Murphy	4
(Belgium) Bjorn Haneveer	3	(England) Shaun Murphy	4
(England) Martin Gould	2	(Wales) Mark Williams	3
(Wales) Mark Williams	4			(England) Shaun Murphy	4
(China) Liang Wenbo	1			(England) Matthew Couch	2
(Republic of Ireland) Fergal O'Brien	4	(Republic of Ireland) Fergal O'Brien	3
(England) Matthew Couch	4	(England) Matthew Couch	4
(England) Ricky Walden	2

== Final ==
Final: Best of 7 frames. Boudewijn Seapark, Bruges, Belgium, 3 October 2010.
Shaun Murphy; England	4–2	Matthew Couch; England
48–57, 58–17 (58), 63–45, 77–0 (70), 8–82, 108–0 (104)
104	Highest break	–
1	Century breaks	0
3	50+ breaks	0

== Century breaks ==
- 140 – Jamie Cope
- 137, 113, 106, 104 – Shaun Murphy
- 137, 104 – Ding Junhui
- 136 – Gerard Greene
- 136 – Anthony McGill
- 135 – Tony Drago
- 133, 118 – Daniel Wells
- 132, 126 – Fergal O'Brien
- 131, 118 – Martin Gould
- 131 – Luca Brecel
- 130 – Rod Lawler
- 129, 101 – Jimmy Robertson
- 126, 124, 102, 100 – Mark Selby
- 125 – Andrew Norman
- 122, 118 – Peter Ebdon
- 122 – Dave Harold
- 122 – Craig Steadman
- 120 – Nick Jennings
- 118 – Judd Trump
- 115, 100 – Peter Bullen
- 114, 104 – Mark Williams
- 112 – Andy Hicks
- 112 – Rory McLeod
- 109, 100 – Mark Joyce
- 108 – Michael Holt
- 108 – Jamie Jones
- 106, 102 – Marco Fu
- 103 – Nigel Bond
- 103 – Liu Chuang
- 102 – Barry Pinches
- 101, 101 – Mark King
- 100 – Igor Figueiredo
- 100 – Jack Lisowski
- 100 – Jimmy White
