= Matthew Couch =

English snooker player

Personal information
- Born: 30 June 1974 (age 52)

Sport
- Country: England
- Sport: Snooker
- Professional: 1992–2004, 2005–2007, 2008–2012
- Highest ranking: 47 (1999/2000)
- Best ranking finish: Quarter-final (x1)

Matthew Couch (born 30 June 1974) is an English former professional snooker player.

== Career ==
During a professional career lasting from 1992 to 2012, Couch had little success in ranking events, although he reached the quarter-finals of the UK Championship in 1998, and he made his highest break of 141 in 2002. He returned to the Main Tour for the 2008–09 season, and produced a fine run in the World Championship qualifiers, including a 10–3 victory over former world champion John Parrott. In October 2010, Couch had one of his best results to date, reaching the final of the Brugge Open, where he lost 2–4 against another former world champion Shaun Murphy. He dropped off the snooker tour at the end of the 2011–12 season.

== Personal life ==
Couch is also an official World Snooker coach, and currently resides in Scunthorpe.

== Performance and rankings timeline ==
| Tournament | 1992/ 93 | 1993/ 94 | | 1994/ 95 | 1995/ 96 | 1996/ 97 | 1997/ 98 | 1998/ 99 | 1999/ 00 | 2000/ 01 | 2001/ 02 | 2002/ 03 | 2003/ 04 | 2004/ 05 | 2005/ 06 | 2006/ 07 | 2008/ 09 | 2009/ 10 | 2010/ 11 | 2011/ 12 | 2012/ 13 | 2013/ 14 |
|---|---|---|---|---|---|---|---|---|---|---|---|---|---|---|---|---|---|---|---|---|---|---|
| Ranking (Note: From the 2010/2011 season it shows the ranking at the beginning of the season.) | (Note: New players on the Main Tour don't have a ranking.) | 347 | | 135 | 76 | 83 | 94 | 78 | 47 | 57 | 77 | 79 | 79 | (Note: He was an amateur.) | | 70 | | 69 | 67 | 70 | | |
Ranking tournaments
| Australian Goldfields Open (Note: The event was called the Australian Open (1994/1995–1995/1996) and the Australian Masters (1995/1996)) | Not Held | | | Non-Ranking | | Tournament Not Held | | | | | | | | | | | | | | LQ | A | A |
| Shanghai Masters | Tournament Not Held | | | | | | | | | | | | | | | | LQ | LQ | LQ | LQ | A | A |
| UK Championship | LQ | LQ | | LQ | LQ | LQ | LQ | QF | LQ | LQ | LQ | LQ | LQ | A | LQ | LQ | LQ | LQ | LQ | LQ | A | A |
| German Masters (Note: The event was called the German Open (1995/1996-1997/1998)) | Tournament Not Held | | | | LQ | LQ | LQ | NR | Tournament Not Held | | | | | | | | | | LQ | LQ | A | A |
| Welsh Open | LQ | LQ | | 1R | LQ | LQ | LQ | 1R | LQ | LQ | LQ | LQ | LQ | A | LQ | LQ | LQ | LQ | LQ | A | A | A |
| World Open (Note: The event was called the Grand Prix (1992/1993–2000/2001, 2004/2005–2009/2010) and the LG Cup (2001/2002–2003/2004)) | LQ | LQ | | LQ | LQ | LQ | 1R | 1R | LQ | 1R | LQ | LQ | LQ | A | LQ | LQ | LQ | LQ | 1R | A | A | A |
| Players Tour Championship Grand Final | Tournament Not Held | | | | | | | | | | | | | | | | | | DNQ | DNQ | DNQ | DNQ |
| China Open (Note: The event was called the China International (1997/1998-1998/1999)) | Tournament Not Held | | | | | | NR | LQ | LQ | LQ | LQ | Not Held | | A | LQ | LQ | LQ | LQ | LQ | A | A | A |
| World Championship | LQ | LQ | | LQ | LQ | LQ | LQ | LQ | LQ | LQ | LQ | LQ | LQ | LQ | LQ | LQ | LQ | LQ | LQ | LQ | A | A |
Non-ranking tournaments
| The Masters | LQ | A | | LQ | LQ | LQ | LQ | LQ | LQ | LQ | LQ | LQ | LQ | A | LQ | LQ | LQ | LQ | A | A | A | A |
| Shoot Out | Tournament Not Held | | | | | | | | | | | | | | | | | | 1R | A | A | A |
Former ranking tournaments
| Asian Classic (Note: The event was called the Dubai Classic (1992/1993-1994/1995) and the Thailand Classic (1995/1996)) | LQ | LQ | | LQ | LQ | LQ | Tournament Not Held | | | | | | | | | | | | | | | |
| Malta Grand Prix | Not Held | | | Non-Ranking Event | | | | | LQ | NR | Tournament Not Held | | | | | | | | | | | |
| Thailand Masters (Note: The event was called the Asian Open (1992/1993) and the Thailand Open (1993/1994-1996/1997)) | LQ | LQ | | LQ | LQ | LQ | LQ | LQ | LQ | LQ | LQ | NR | Not Held | | | NR | Tournament Not Held | | | | | |
| Scottish Open (Note: The event was called the International Open (1992/1993-1996/1997) and the Players Championship (2003/2004)) | LQ | LQ | | LQ | LQ | LQ | 1R | LQ | LQ | LQ | LQ | LQ | LQ | Tournament Not Held | | | | | | | MR | NH |
| British Open | LQ | 1R | | LQ | 1R | LQ | 1R | LQ | LQ | LQ | LQ | LQ | LQ | A | Tournament Not Held | | | | | | | |
| Irish Masters | Non-Ranking Event | | | | | | | | | | | LQ | LQ | A | NH | NR | Tournament Not Held | | | | | |
| Malta Cup (Note: The event was called the European Open (1992/1993-1996/1997 and 2001/2002-2003/2004) and the Irish Open (1998/1999)) | LQ | LQ | | WR | LQ | LQ | NH | 2R | Not Held | | LQ | LQ | LQ | A | LQ | LQ | Tournament Not Held | | | | | |
| Northern Ireland Trophy | Tournament Not Held | | | | | | | | | | | | | | NR | 1R | LQ | Tournament Not Held | | | | |
| Bahrain Championship | Tournament Not Held | | | | | | | | | | | | | | | | LQ | Tournament Not Held | | | | |
Former non-ranking tournaments
| Strachan Open | MR | LQ | LQ | Tournament Not Held | | | | | | | | | | | | | | | | | | |

Performance table legend
| LQ | lost in the qualifying draw | #R | lost in the early rounds of the tournament (WR = Wildcard round, RR = Round robin) | QF | lost in the quarter-finals |
| SF | lost in the semi–finals | F | lost in the final | W | won the tournament |
| DNQ | did not qualify for the tournament | A | did not participate in the tournament | WD | withdrew from the tournament |

| NH / Not Held | means an event was not held. |
| NR / Non-Ranking Event | means an event is/was no longer a ranking event. |
| R / Ranking Event | means an event is/was a ranking event. |
| MR / Minor-Ranking Event | means an event is/was a minor-ranking event. |

== Career finals ==
=== Minor-ranking finals: 1 ===
| Outcome | Year | Championship | Opponent in the final | Score |
|---|---|---|---|---|
| Runner-up | 2010 | EPTC Event 2 | (England) Shaun Murphy | 2–4 |

=== Non-ranking finals: 4 (1 title) ===
| Outcome | Year | Championship | Opponent in the final | Score |
|---|---|---|---|---|
| Runner-up | 1995 | WPBSA Minor Tour – Event 4 | (England) Colin Morton | 5–6 |
| Runner-up | 1999 | UK Tour – Event 3 | (England) Stuart Bingham | 1–6 |
| Winner | 2002 | WPBSA Open Tour – Event 4 | (England) Munraj Pal | 5–3 |
| Runner-up | 2005 | Challenge Tour – Event 4 | (England) Jamie Cope | 0–6 |

=== Pro-am finals: 14 (7 titles) ===
| Outcome | Year | Championship | Opponent in the final | Score |
|---|---|---|---|---|
| Winner | 1996 | Marseille International Open | (Scotland) Graeme Dott | 5–4 |
| Winner | 1996 | Pontins Autumn Open | (England) Gary Ponting | 5–4 |
| Runner-up | 1997 | Austrian Open | (Scotland) Graeme Dott | 6–7 |
| Runner-up | 1997 | Pontins Autumn Open | (Scotland) James McGouran | 3–5 |
| Winner | 1998 | Pontins Autumn Open (2) | (England) Brian Salmon | 5–1 |
| Winner | 1999 | Hannover International Masters | (England) Shaun Murphy | 6–5 |
| Runner-up | 2000 | Austrian Open (2) | (Finland) Robin Hull | 1–5 |
| Winner | 2006 | Austrian Open | (Germany) Patrick Einsle | 6–2 |
| Winner | 2006 | Swiss Open | (England) Dave Harold | 4–3 |
| Winner | 2007 | Paul Hunter English Open | (Australia) Neil Robertson | 6–5 |
| Runner-up | 2009 | Pontins Spring Open | (England) Stuart Bingham | 1–5 |
| Runner-up | 2009 | Dutch Open | (Belgium) Bjorn Haneveer | 3–6 |
| Runner-up | 2010 | 3 Kings Open | (Wales) Dominic Dale | 1–5 |
| Runner-up | 2012 | Austrian Open (3) | (Wales) Mark Williams | 5–6 |

=== Team finals: 1 ===
| Outcome | Year | Championship | Team/partner | Opponent in the final | Score |
|---|---|---|---|---|---|
| Runner-up | 2006 | World Mixed Doubles Championship | (England) Sonia Chapman | (Northern Ireland) Mark Allen (England) Reanne Evans | 0–3 |
