= 2005 Northern Ireland Trophy =

Northern Ireland Trophy
Tournament information
- Dates: 17–21 August 2005
- Venue: Waterfront Hall
- City: Belfast
- Country: Northern Ireland
- Organisation: World Professional Billiards and Snooker Association
- Format: Non-ranking event
- Total prize fund: £104,000
- Winner's share: £23,000
- Highest break: (Scotland) Alan McManus (140)

Final
- Champion: (Wales) Matthew Stevens
- Runner-up: (Scotland) Stephen Hendry
- Score: 9–7

The 2005 Northern Ireland Trophy was the first edition of the Northern Ireland Trophy snooker tournament, held from 17 to 21 August 2005, at the Waterfront Hall, Belfast, Northern Ireland. Matthew Stevens defeated Stephen Hendry by nine frames to seven (9–7) in the final. Alan McManus made the highest break with 140. This was the only year the tournament was held as a non-ranking event; it would become a ranking tournament for the next three seasons.

The top 16 ranked players were invited, Paul Hunter and Stephen Lee did not participate. They were replaced by Ali Carter and 2005 World Champion Shaun Murphy. Northern Ireland players Mark Allen and Joe Swail were invited as wildcards along with Ding Junhui and Neil Robertson.

== Prize fund ==
The breakdown of prize money for this year is shown below:

- Winner: £23,000
- Final: £12,000
- Semi-final: £6,500
- Quarter-final: £5,000
- Last 16: £4,000
- Wildcard round: £4,000

Players who entered as wildcards received less prize money: Robertson received £3,500 for reaching the semi-final, Allen and Swail received £2,000 for reaching the quarter-finals while Ding received £1,000 for reaching the last 16.

== Wild-card round ==
Match		Score	
WC1	Steve Davis (ENG)	0–4	Mark Allen (NIR)
WC2	Ali Carter (ENG)	0–4	Ding Junhui (CHN)
WC3	Ian McCulloch (ENG)	0–4	Neil Robertson (AUS)
WC4	Joe Perry (ENG)	1–4	Joe Swail (NIR)

== Main draw ==
Last 16; Best of 7 frames
(England) Ronnie O'Sullivan	2
(Northern Ireland) Joe Swail	4
(England) Peter Ebdon	0
(Scotland) Alan McManus	4
(Scotland) John Higgins	1
(Northern Ireland) Mark Allen	4
(Scotland) Stephen Hendry	4
(China) Ding Junhui	2
(Wales) Matthew Stevens	4
(Republic of Ireland) Ken Doherty	1
(Scotland) Stephen Maguire	4
(Wales) Mark Williams	3
(England) Jimmy White	2
(Australia) Neil Robertson	4
(Scotland) Graeme Dott	2
(England) Shaun Murphy	4

Quarter-finals; Best of 9 frames
(Northern Ireland) Joe Swail	1
(Scotland) Alan McManus	5
(Northern Ireland) Mark Allen	1
(Scotland) Stephen Hendry	5
(Wales) Matthew Stevens	5
(Scotland) Stephen Maguire	2
(Australia) Neil Robertson	5
(England) Shaun Murphy	4

Semi-finals; Best of 11 frames
(Scotland) Alan McManus	3
(Scotland) Stephen Hendry	6
(Wales) Matthew Stevens	6
(Australia) Neil Robertson	4

Final; Best of 17 frames
(Scotland) Stephen Hendry	7
(Wales) Matthew Stevens	9
