= World Series of Snooker 2008/2009 =

Logo of the World Series of Snooker

The World Series of Snooker was played for the first time in the 2008/2009 season. Although there was a previous incarnation of the event organised by Matchroom Sport, that ran in the 1987/88 season, and from 1990/91 until 1992/93. It was a series of five non-ranking tournaments spread over Europe, where top professional players performed against regional wildcard players. The series consisted of four tournaments plus a Grand Final for which the winner earned €50,000.

The winner of each tournament received five points, the runner-up three and losing semi-finalists one each. These points determined the seeding positions for the Grand Final, with the top four getting a bye to quarter-finals and fifth and sixth getting a bye to the second round. In the final Shaun Murphy defeated John Higgins 6–2.

== World Series of Snooker Jersey ==
The first event was held in Saint Helier, Jersey between 21 and 22 June 2008.

John Higgins won in the final 6–3 against Mark Selby.

=== Players ===
Professionals:

- (England) Mark Selby
- (Republic of Ireland) Ken Doherty
- (England) Shaun Murphy
- (Scotland) John Higgins

Wildcards:

- (Poland) Rafał Jewtuch
- (Jersey) Gary Britton
- (Guernsey) Martyn Desperques
- (Jersey) Aaron Canavan

=== Main draw ===
Quarter-finals; Best of 7 Frames
(England) Mark Selby	4
(Poland) Rafał Jewtuch	0
(Republic of Ireland) Ken Doherty	1
(Jersey) Gary Britton	4
(England) Shaun Murphy	4
(Guernsey) Martyn Desperques	1
(Scotland) John Higgins	4
(Jersey) Aaron Canavan	0

Semi-finals; Best of 9 Frames
(England) Mark Selby	5
(Jersey) Gary Britton	1
(England) Shaun Murphy	2
(Scotland) John Higgins	5

Final; Best of 11 Frames
(England) Mark Selby	3
(Scotland) John Higgins	6

=== Century breaks ===
- 105 – Mark Selby
- 104 – John Higgins

World Series of Snooker World Series of Snooker Jersey
Tournament information
- Dates: 21–22 June 2008
- Venue: Fort Regent
- City: Saint Helier
- Country: Jersey
- Organisation: FSTC Sports Management
- Format: Non-ranking event
- Highest break: 105

Final
- Champion: (Scotland) John Higgins
- Runner-up: (England) Mark Selby
- Score: 6–3

== World Series of Snooker Berlin ==
The second event was held in Berlin, Germany between 12 and 13 July 2008.

Graeme Dott won in the final 6–1 against Shaun Murphy.

=== Players ===
Professionals:

- (Scotland) Graeme Dott
- (Scotland) John Higgins
- (Scotland) Stephen Maguire
- (England) Shaun Murphy

Wildcards:

- (New Zealand) Chris McBreen
- (Germany) Lasse Münstermann
- (Belgium) Hans Blankaert
- (Germany) Patrick Einsle

=== Main draw ===
Quarter-finals; Best of 7 Frames
(Scotland) Graeme Dott	4
(New Zealand) Chris McBreen	1
(Scotland) John Higgins	4
(Germany) Lasse Münstermann	3
(Scotland) Stephen Maguire	4
(Belgium) Hans Blankaert	0
(England) Shaun Murphy	4
(Germany) Patrick Einsle	0

Semi-finals; Best of 9 Frames
(Scotland) Graeme Dott	5
(Scotland) John Higgins	4
(Scotland) Stephen Maguire	3
(England) Shaun Murphy	5

Final; Best of 11 Frames
(Scotland) Graeme Dott	6
(England) Shaun Murphy	1

=== Century breaks ===
- 132 – Shaun Murphy
- 113 – Graeme Dott

World Series of Snooker World Series of Snooker Berlin
Tournament information
- Dates: 12–13 July 2008
- Venue: Tempodrom
- City: Berlin
- Country: Germany
- Organisation: FSTC Sports Management
- Format: Non-ranking event
- Highest break: 132

Final
- Champion: (Scotland) Graeme Dott
- Runner-up: (England) Shaun Murphy
- Score: 6–1

== World Series of Snooker Warsaw ==
The third event was held in Warsaw, Poland between 25 and 26 October 2008.

Ding Junhui won in the final 6–4 against Ken Doherty.

=== Players ===
Professionals:

- (England) Steve Davis
- (England) Mark Selby
- (China) Ding Junhui
- (Republic of Ireland) Ken Doherty

Wildcards:

- (Poland) Rafał Górecki
- (Poland) Mariusz Sirko
- (Poland) Piotr Murat
- (Poland) Rafał Jewtuch

=== Main draw ===
Quarter-finals; Best of 7 Frames
(Republic of Ireland) Ken Doherty	4
(Poland) Rafał Górecki	0
(England) Mark Selby	4
(Poland) Mariusz Sirko	0
(England) Steve Davis	4
(Poland) Rafał Jewtuch	0
(China) Ding Junhui	4
(Poland) Piotr Murat	0

Semi-finals; Best of 9 Frames
(Republic of Ireland) Ken Doherty	5
(England) Mark Selby	3
(England) Steve Davis	1
(China) Ding Junhui	5

Final; Best of 11 Frames
(Republic of Ireland) Ken Doherty	4
(China) Ding Junhui	6

=== Century breaks ===
- 102, 100 – Mark Selby
- 101 – Ding Junhui

World Series of Snooker World Series of Snooker Warsaw
Tournament information
- Dates: 25–26 October 2008
- Venue: EXPO XXI
- City: Warsaw
- Country: Poland
- Organisation: FSTC Sports Management
- Format: Non-ranking event
- Highest break: 102

Final
- Champion: (China) Ding Junhui
- Runner-up: (Republic of Ireland) Ken Doherty
- Score: 6–4

== World Series of Snooker Moscow ==
The fourth event was held in Moscow, Russia between 22 and 23 November 2008.

John Higgins won in the final 5–0 against Ding Junhui.

=== Players ===
Professionals:

- (Scotland) John Higgins
- (China) Ding Junhui
- (England) Mark Selby

Wildcards:

- (Russia) Anna Mazhirina
- (Israel) Shachar Ruberg
- (Belarus) Sergey Vasiliev
- (Russia) Ruslan Chinakhov
- (Ukraine) Sergey Isaenko

=== Main draw ===
Quarter-finals; Best of 7 Frames
(Scotland) John Higgins	4
(Russia) Anna Mazhirina	0
(Israel) Shachar Ruberg	4
(Belarus) Sergey Vasiliev	1
(China) Ding Junhui	4
(Ukraine) Sergey Isaenko	0
(England) Mark Selby	4
(Russia) Ruslan Chinakhov	1

Semi-finals; Best of 7 Frames
(Scotland) John Higgins	4
(Israel) Shachar Ruberg	0
(China) Ding Junhui	4
(England) Mark Selby	2

Final; Best of 9 Frames
(Scotland) John Higgins	5
(China) Ding Junhui	0

=== Century breaks ===
- 127 – John Higgins

World Series of Snooker World Series of Snooker Moscow
Tournament information
- Dates: 22–23 November 2008
- Venue: Krilya Sovetov Sports Arena
- City: Moscow
- Country: Russia
- Organisation: FSTC Sports Management
- Format: Non-ranking event
- Highest break: 127

Final
- Champion: (Scotland) John Higgins
- Runner-up: (China) Ding Junhui
- Score: 5–0

== Points table ==
Rank	Player	(Jersey)	(Germany)	(Poland)	(Russia)	Total
1	(Scotland) John Higgins	5	1	-	5	11
2	(China) Ding Junhui	-	-	5	3	8
3	(Scotland) Graeme Dott	-	5	-	-	5
3	(England) Mark Selby	3	-	1	1	5
5	(England) Shaun Murphy	1	3	-	-	4
6	(Republic of Ireland) Ken Doherty	0	-	3	-	3
7	(Jersey) Gary Britton	1	-	-	-	1
7	(Scotland) Stephen Maguire	-	1	-	-	1
7	(England) Steve Davis	-	-	1	-	1
7	(Israel) Shachar Ruberg	-	-	-	1	1

== World Series of Snooker Grand Final ==
The Grand Final of the World Series of Snooker was held in Portimão, Portugal between 8–10 May 2009.

Shaun Murphy won in the final 6–2 against John Higgins. This was the only Grand Final in the history of the World Series of Snooker. Murphy won the title a week after losing the World Snooker Championship Final to Higgins.

=== Players ===
Group one:

- (Wales) **Ryan Day**
- (Germany) Lasse Munstermann
- (Poland) Michal Zielinski
- (Jersey) Garry Britton

Group two:

- (England) **Jimmy White**
- (Israel) Schachar Ruberg
- (Germany) Itaro Santos
- (Belgium) Luca Brecel

Knockout stage:

- (Wales) **Ryan Day**
- (Jersey) Garry Britton
- (Belgium) Luca Brecel
- (England) **Jimmy White**
- (England) **Steve Davis**
- (Scotland) **Stephen Maguire**
- (Republic of Ireland) **Ken Doherty**
- (England) **Shaun Murphy**
- (Scotland) **John Higgins**
- (China) **Ding Junhui**
- (Scotland) **Graeme Dott**
- (England) **Mark Selby**

Note: professional players in **bold**.

World Series of Snooker Grand Final
Tournament information
- Dates: 8–10 May 2009
- Venue: Pavilhão Arena
- City: Portimão
- Country: Portugal
- Organisation: FSTC Sports Management
- Format: Non-ranking event
- Highest break: 122

Final
- Champion: (England) Shaun Murphy
- Runner-up: (Scotland) John Higgins
- Score: 6–2

=== Round-robin stage ===
Round one was played in a round robin format. The matches were best of seven frames. Each player played each other once. The winner and runner-up advanced to round two.

==== Group one ====
**Table**

POS	Player	MP	MW	FW	FL	FD	PTS
1	(Wales) **Ryan Day**	3	3	12	2	+10	3
2	(Jersey) **Garry Britton**	3	2	8	9	−1	2
3	(Germany) Lasse Münstermann	3	1	7	9	−2	1
4	(Poland) Michał Zieliński	3	0	4	12	−8	0

Matches:

- **Ryan Day 4**–0 Garry Britton
- Michał Zieliński 1–**4 Lasse Münstermann**
- **Ryan Day 4**–1 Michał Zieliński
- Lasse Münstermann 2–**4 Garry Britton**
- **Ryan Day 4**–1 Lasse Münstermann
- **Garry Britton 4**–2 Michał Zieliński

==== Group two ====
**Table**

POS	Player	MP	MW	FW	FL	FD	PTS
1	(Belgium) **Luca Brecel**	3	3	12	6	+6	3
2	(England) **Jimmy White**	3	2	11	5	+6	2
3	(Germany) Itaro Santos	3	1	6	10	−4	1
4	(Israel) Schachar Ruberg	3	0	4	12	−8	0

Matches:

- **Jimmy White 4**–1 Itaro Santos
- **Luca Brecel 4**–2 Schachar Ruberg
- **Jimmy White 4**–0 Schachar Ruberg
- Itaro Santos 1–**4 Luca Brecel**
- Jimmy White 3–**4 Luca Brecel**
- Schachar Ruberg 2–**4 Itaro Santos**

=== Knockout stage ===
Round two Best of 9 frames
(England) **Steve Davis**	**5**
(England) Jimmy White	4
(Scotland) **Stephen Maguire**	**5**
(Jersey) Garry Britton	2
(Republic of Ireland) Ken Doherty	3
(Belgium) **Luca Brecel**	**5**
(England) **Shaun Murphy**	**5**
(Wales) Ryan Day	1

Quarter-finals; Best of 9 frames
(Scotland) **John Higgins**	**5**
(England) Steve Davis	2
(China) Ding Junhui	2
(Scotland) **Stephen Maguire**	**5**
(Scotland) **Graeme Dott**	**5**
(Belgium) Luca Brecel	4
(England) Mark Selby	4
(England) **Shaun Murphy**	**5**

Semi-finals; Best of 9 frames
(Scotland) **John Higgins**	**5**
(Scotland) Stephen Maguire	3
(Scotland) Graeme Dott	4
(England) **Shaun Murphy**	**5**

Final; Best of 11 frames
(Scotland) John Higgins	2
(England) **Shaun Murphy**	**6**

=== Century breaks ===
- 122, 105, 100 – Shaun Murphy
- 101 – John Higgins
- 100 – Graeme Dott
