= Stephen Maguire =

Scottish snooker player (born 1981)

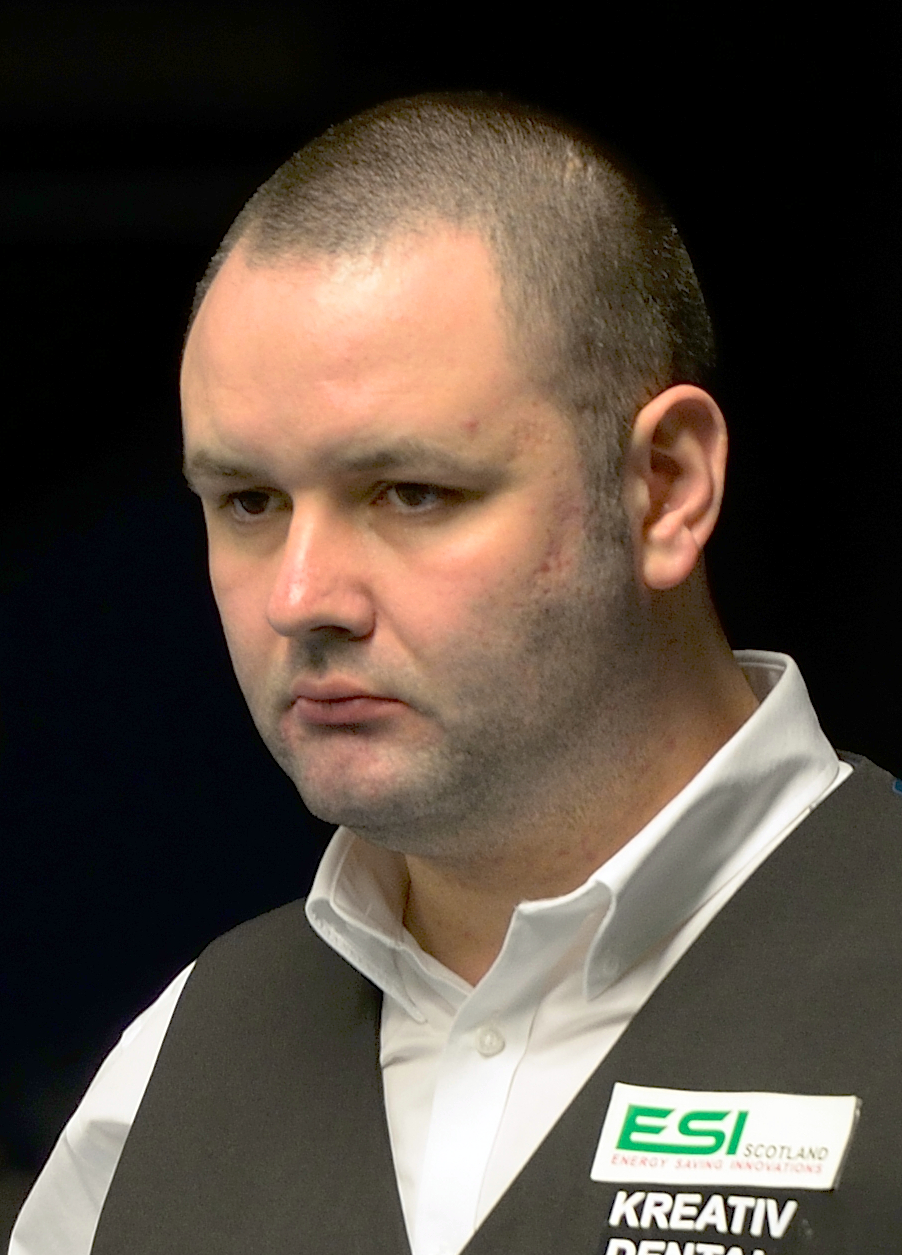
- Maguire at the 2015 German Masters

Personal information
- Nickname: The Maverick
- Born: 13 March 1981 (age 45) Glasgow, Scotland

Sport
- Country: Scotland
- Sport: Snooker
- Professional: 1998–present
- Highest ranking: 2 (2008/09–2009/10)
- Current ranking: 31 (as of 7 November 2026)
- Maximum breaks: 3
- Century breaks: 551 (as of 19 November 2026)

Tournament wins
- Ranking: 7
- Minor-ranking: 3

Stephen Maguire (born 13 March 1981) is a Scottish professional snooker player. He has won seven major ranking tournaments, including the 2004 UK Championship, and has twice since reached the finals of that event. Maguire turned professional in 1998 after winning the IBSF World Snooker Championship. He was in the top 16 of the snooker world rankings for 11 consecutive years, from 2005 to 2016, twice reaching world no. 2. He is a prolific break-builder, having compiled over 500 century breaks, including three maximums.

== Career ==
=== Early career ===
Maguire turned professional as a snooker player in 1998. He qualified for the 1999 UK Championship, where he was defeated 2–9 by Mark King in the first round. He played in qualifying for the 2000 World Championship, defeating Wayne Brown, Nick Walker and Bradley Jones to reach the final qualifying round, where he lost 9–10 to Joe Swail. Maguire qualified again for the 2002 UK Championship, going on to defeat Fergal O'Brien 9–4 in the first round, before losing 7–9 to Ken Doherty in the second.

Two years later, Maguire reached the final of his first world ranking event, the 2004 European Open. Ranked 41st in the world, he defeated Peter Ebdon and Joe Perry (both 5–4), John Higgins 5–3 and Stephen Lee 6–4 to meet Jimmy White in the final. He then defeated White 9–3 to win the championship. The BBC described Maguire as a "surprising winner", and he admitted to being "very surprised how badly everybody has played against me here". At the 2004 World Championship later that season, he qualified for the 32-player competition for the first time. He lost 6–10 in the opening round to Ronnie O'Sullivan, who admitted to being impressed by Maguire's performance and tipped him to be a future world champion.

The following season at the 2004 British Open, Maguire defeated O'Sullivan 6–1 in the semi-finals to reach his second ranking event final. This led to O'Sullivan claiming that he had "never seen anything like that on a snooker table before" and also rated Maguire as "probably the best [player] in the world at the moment". Maguire met John Higgins in the final, but lost 6–9.

=== 2004–2009: UK Championship winner (2004) ===
At the 2004 UK Championship, Maguire defeated Mark King, Mark Davis, Stephen Lee, Ronnie O'Sullivan and Steve Davis en route to the final, where he defeated David Gray 10–1. Players praised the quality of play that Maguire had produced to win his first Triple Crown event. Davis described him as "inspired", while O'Sullivan suggested that he could "rule the game for the next ten years". In the first round of the 2005 World Championship, Maguire led O'Sullivan 9–7 but lost the match 9–10. At the end of the season he moved from 24th to 3rd in the world rankings.

During the 2005–06 snooker season, Maguire only reached one quarter-final, at the 2006 Malta Cup where he lost 4–5 against Ken Doherty. He won his first-round match at the 2006 World Championship, but lost to Marco Fu 4–13 in the second round. However, at the 2007 World Championship the following year, he defeated Joe Perry, Joe Swail and Anthony Hamilton to reach the semi-finals. He played John Higgins and led 14–10, but lost seven out of the next eight frames to lose 15–17.

Maguire won the ranking Northern Ireland Trophy in November 2007, defeating Fergal O'Brien 9–5 in the final. His second Triple Crown final came at the 2007 UK Championship. He defeated Joe Swail, Ian McCulloch, Mark Williams and Shaun Murphy to reach the final, where he was defeated by Ronnie O'Sullivan 10–2. At the 2008 China Open, Maguire compiled his second maximum break against Ryan Day in the semi-finals. He won the match 6–5 and then beat Murphy in the final 10–9 on a deciding frame to win the title. He reached the quarter-final stage of the 2008 World Championship, but lost in another final-frame decider (12–13) to Joe Perry. He ended the 2007–08 season ranked world number two. He retained this position going into the 2009–10 season, after reaching the semi-finals of both the Shanghai Masters and the UK Championship.

=== 2009–2012: PTC Champion (2011/12) ===
Maguire began the 2009–10 season by winning the first event of the Pro Challenge Series, defeating Alan McManus 5–2 in the final. He followed this by reaching the semi-finals at the UK Championship by defeating Michael Holt 9–6 in the first round, Stuart Bingham 9–3 in the second round, and Peter Lines 9–5 in the quarter-finals, before losing to Ding Junhui 5–9. At the invitational Masters event in January, he beat Mark King 6–3 in the first round and Ryan Day 6–1 in the quarter-finals, but lost 3–6 in the semi-finals against Mark Selby. He also reached the semi-final stage at the Welsh Open, beating Dominic Dale 5–4 in the first round, Barry Hawkins 5–1 in the second round, and Mark Williams 5–1 in the quarter-finals, but he lost 3–6 against defending champion Ali Carter. Maguire made a poor start to the 2011–12 season, with first-round exits at the opening two ranking events of the year, the Australian Goldfields Open and the Shanghai Masters. He defeated Stephen Hendry and John Higgins at the UK Championship to set up a quarter-final with world number seven Judd Trump, but lost the match 3–6. He made three century breaks during the tournament, including a 144, which was the highest of the event.

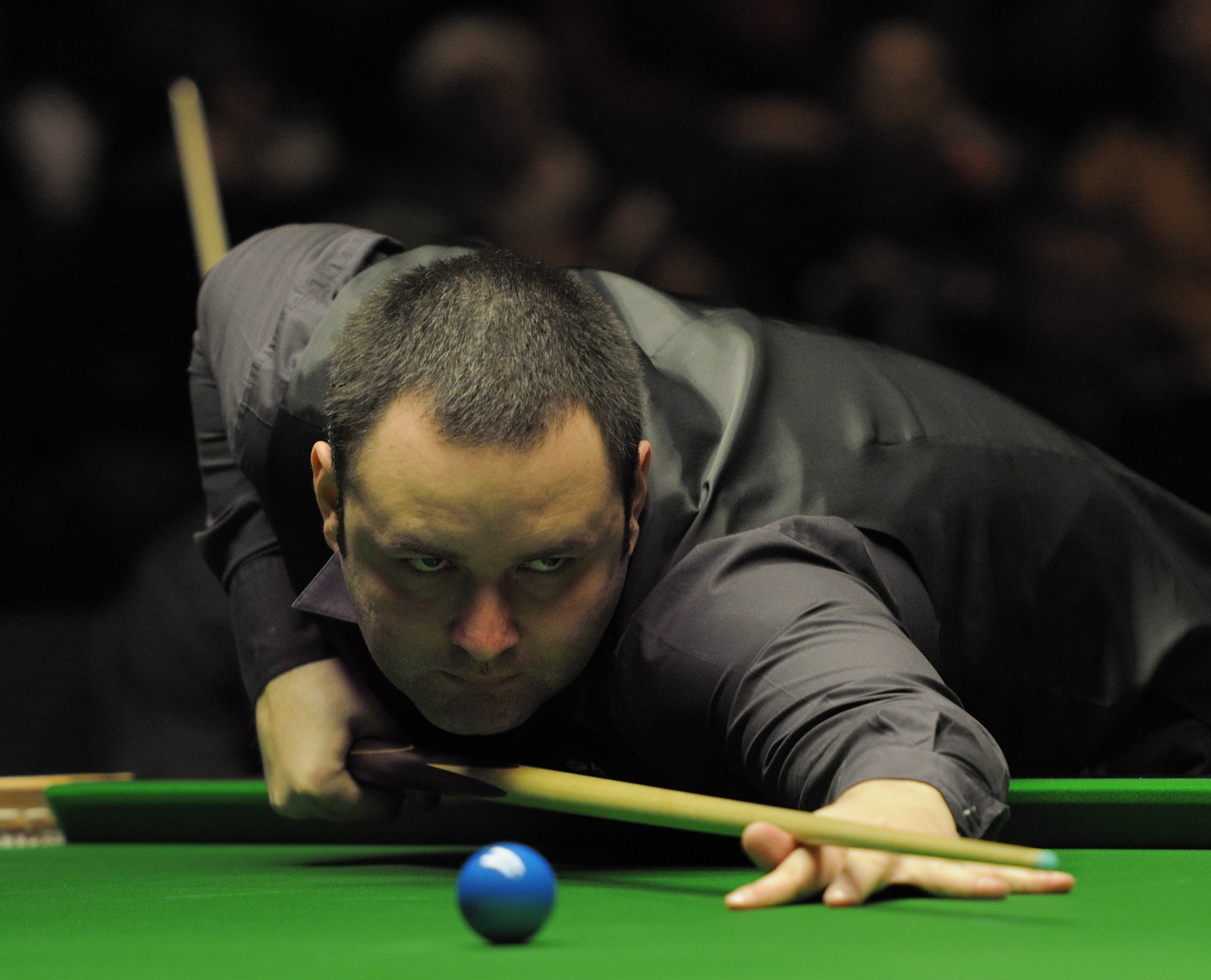
Maguire playing in the 2012 German Masters final against Ronnie O'Sullivan

In January 2012, Maguire won his first tournament carrying ranking points for almost four years, at PTC Event 12 in Germany. After beating Joe Perry 4–2 in the final, he stated that he had not practised at all over the Christmas period. The result meant that he finished eighth in the Order of Merit and qualified for the 2012 Finals. He exited the Masters in the first round for the second successive year following a 4–6 defeat to Mark Williams. He reached the final of the 2012 German Masters, whitewashing both Higgins and Murphy en route. He lost the final 7–9 against O'Sullivan, despite making three consecutive century breaks. At the PTC Finals, Maguire was whitewashed 0–4 in the semi-finals by Neil Robertson.

After a quarter-final run in the Welsh Open and a first-round defeat in the World Open, Maguire competed in the China Open. He had wins over O'Sullivan and Stephen Lee on his way to the final, where he played Peter Ebdon. Maguire trailed 1–5 before winning seven of the next ten frames to level the match at 8–8, forcing a deciding frame which Ebdon won. At the 2012 World Championship, Maguire defeated Luca Brecel 10–5 in the first round, Joe Perry 13–7 in the second, and Stephen Hendry 13–2 in the quarter-finals with a session to spare. He unwittingly became Hendry's last opponent, as the seven-time world champion retired immediately after the match. Maguire lost his semi-final 12–17 to Ali Carter, and finished the season ranked world number four, meaning he had climbed four places during the year.

=== 2012–2015: Welsh Open Champion (2013) ===
Maguire lost in the first round of the opening ranking event of the new season with a 4–5 defeat to Rod Lawler at the Wuxi Classic and then could not advance out of his group in the Six-red World Championship. His results soon picked up, as he won the second PTC title of his career at the UK PTC Event 1 by beating Jack Lisowski 4–3 in the final. He stated after the win that he was going to put a greater emphasis on his safety play this season. Maguire's form continued as he reached his second consecutive PTC Event final, but this time he lost 3–4 to Martin Gould. He then lost in the second round of three consecutive ranking events and the first round of both the Masters and the German Masters.

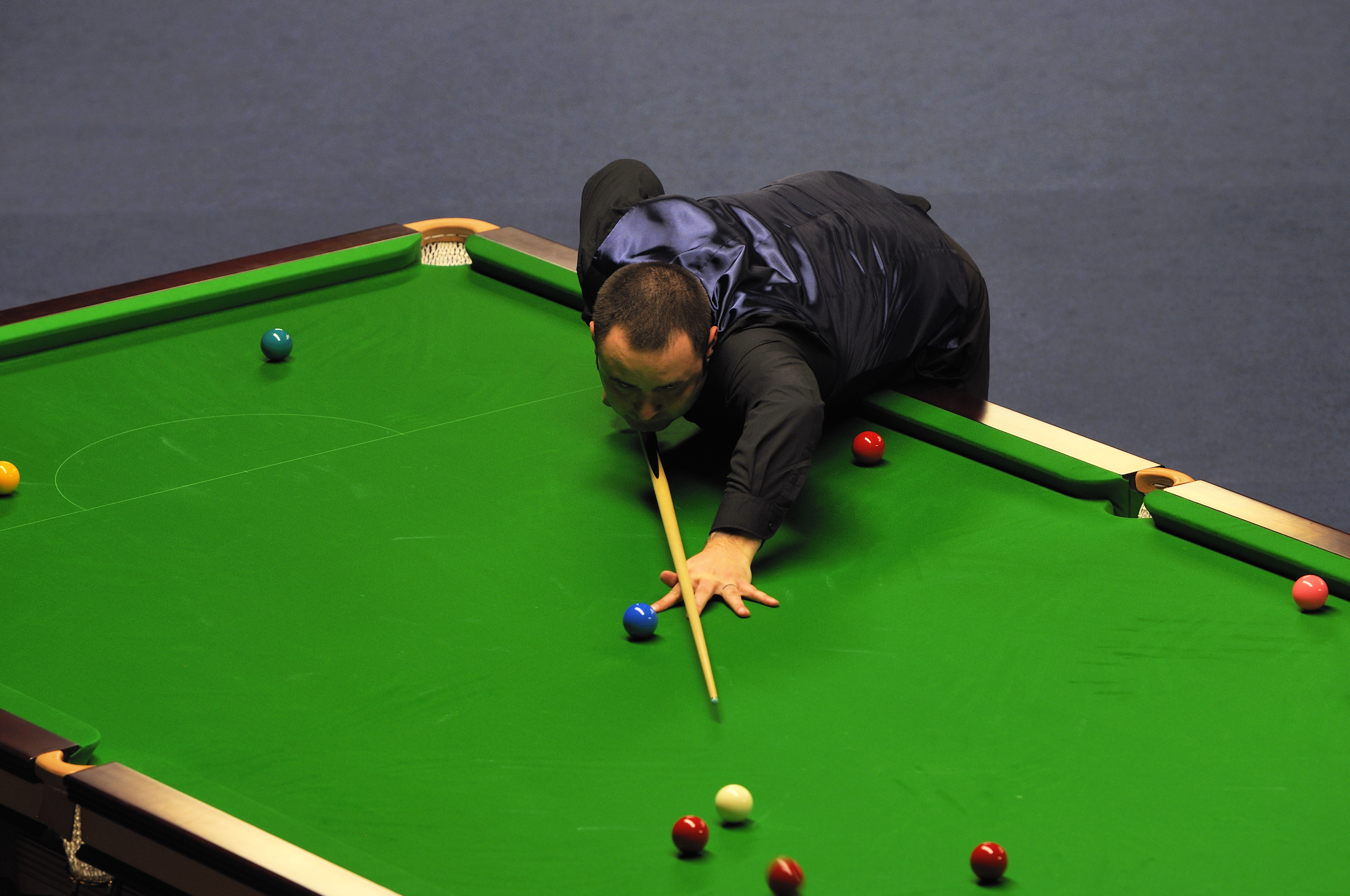
Stephen Maguire at 2013 German Masters

In February 2013, Maguire won his first ranking event title in over five years at the Welsh Open. He defeated Anthony Hamilton, Matthew Stevens, Alan McManus and Judd Trump to face Stuart Bingham in the final. He came back from 5–7 down and eventually won the match with a composed 82 break in the deciding frame to triumph 9–8. He lost 4–5 to Ricky Walden in the second round of the World Open and, despite finishing third on the PTC Order of Merit to qualify for the Finals, was beaten 3–4 by Joe Swail in the first round. Maguire cruised into the semi-finals of the China Open by seeing off Michael Holt 5–3 and Barry Hawkins and Bingham both 5–1. He played Neil Robertson and led 4–2, but went on to lose 5–6. He faced world number 67 Dechawat Poomjaeng in the opening round of the 2013 World Championship and became part of "one of the biggest shocks" in the recent history of the tournament as he lost 9–10 to the "charismatic Thai" player.

Maguire's first ranking event of the 2013–14 season was the Shanghai Masters, where he was defeated 2–5 by Xiao Guodong in the opening round. He reached the semi-finals of the inaugural Indian Open and fought back from 0–3 down against home favourite Aditya Mehta to level at 3–3 but lost the deciding frame. At the UK Championship, Maguire came back from 2–5 down against Luca Brecel in the second round to win 6–5 and also edged past Liang Wenbo 6–5, before beating John Higgins 6–3. He lost 2–6 to Neil Robertson in the quarter-finals, with the Australian criticising the playing condition of the snooker table as "absolute garbage" after the match.

Maguire defeated both Joe Perry 6–4 and Robertson 6–2 at the Masters. He faced O'Sullivan in the semi-finals but lost to the reigning world champion 6–2. He won three matches to reach the last 16 of the Welsh Open, but relinquished his title by losing 3–4 to 19-year-old Joel Walker. He then lost in the first round of the next two ranking events and withdrew from the China Open to enter the 2014 World Championship in poor form. Maguire produced a comeback from 3–6 and 6–9 down against Ryan Day to send the first-round match into a deciding frame but, despite having a chance to win, he lost 9–10. Afterwards, he described it as "a season from hell for me" and "I just want to forget it". He ended the season as world number 14.

In June 2014, Maguire whitewashed Judd Trump 5–0 to reach the quarter-finals of the Wuxi Classic where he lost 4–5 against Martin Gould, despite making the tournament's highest break of 145. Three months later, he won the Six-red World Championship, defeating Ricky Walden 8–7 in the final. However, he failed to advance beyond the second round in the three major ranking events following Wuxi. After losing 1–4 to Trump in the opening round of the Champion of Champions, Maguire hinted at retiring from the game. When he came back from 0–3 down against Yu Delu to win 6–4 in the second round of the UK Championship, he remarked that he might seek the help of a sports psychologist in the future. He then beat Mark Williams 6–2, David Morris 6–3 and Marco Fu 6–4 to play in his first major ranking event semi-final in over a year. He again faced Trump and lost the first four frames, as well as being 1–5 behind. Maguire pulled the deficit back to a single frame and had chances to send the match into a deciding frame, but went in-off when escaping a snooker on the colours and lost 4–6. A week later, Maguire continued his resurgence of form to win the inaugural Lisbon Open, defeating Matthew Selt 4–2 in the final. During the German Masters, he stated that he had regained his confidence and it would take "something special to stop him". He needed two snookers in the deciding frame of his quarter-final match with Neil Robertson, which he managed after Robertson accidentally potted the black. In his second consecutive ranking event semi-final, Maguire was defeated 2–6 by Mark Selby. He advanced to the quarter-finals of the Welsh Open without facing a top-16 player, and lost 1–5 to John Higgins.

In 2015, Maguire qualified for the televised stages of the World Championship for a 12th straight year courtesy of Selby defeating Robert Milkins in the China Open, which kept Maguire in the top 16. In the opening round of the World Championship, he forced a deciding frame after having been 5–9 down to Anthony McGill, but then lost the decider. This was the fourth time in five seasons that Maguire had lost in the last 32 of the World Championship, and on each occasion he exited 9–10 having trailed and levelled the match. His end-of-season ranking of world number 15 was the lowest he had been in 11 years.

=== 2015–2018: Decline in form ===
Maguire and teammate John Higgins lost in the final of the 2015 Snooker World Cup to Chinese teenagers Zhou Yuelong and Yan Bingtao. Maguire then reached the semi-finals of the first ranking event of the year by thrashing Judd Trump 5–1 at the Australian Goldfields Open, but he lost 1–6 to Martin Gould. He began his fourth-round match against Neil Robertson with a 118 break, but it was the only frame he could win in a 1–6 defeat. He was knocked out in the quarter-finals of the German Masters 1–5 by Graeme Dott and the first round of both the Welsh Open (3–4 to Martin O'Donnell) and the World Grand Prix (0–4 to Higgins). He failed to qualify for the PTC Finals after finishing 42nd on the European Order of Merit. This meant that Maguire needed a strong run at the China Open to avoid having to qualify for the 2016 World Championship at the end of the season. He achieved this with four wins to the China Cup semi-finals, but he was then whitewashed 6–0 by Trump. Despite his automatic qualification for the World Championship, Maguire stated that he felt embarrassed at being unable to motivate himself for the event, after losing 7–10 to Alan McManus in the first round. His 18th-place campaign was the first time that Maguire finished outside of the top 16 since 2004.

Maguire beat Barry Hawkins to make the quarter-finals of the Indian Open where he lost 1–4 to Anthony McGill. He made a 147 and two other centuries in his 5–0 wildcard win over Xu Yichen at the Shanghai Masters. He then whitewashed Shaun Murphy 5–0 and defeated Hawkins 5–3 and Michael White 5–1 to reach the semi-finals, where he lost 3–6 to Ding Junhui. He lost 3–6 to Luca Brecel in the fourth round of the UK Championship and was then defeated 1–5 against Mark Selby in the quarter-finals of the China Open. Maguire was unable to break back into the top 16 during the season and so needed to win three matches to qualify for the 2017 World Championship. Victories followed over Kritsanut Lertsattayathorn, Nigel Bond and Li Hang and he faced McGill in the opening round. From 2–2, Maguire scored 447 points without reply and went on to triumph 10–2 in his first match win at the Crucible since 2012. He then thrashed Rory McLeod 13–3 with a session to spare to reach the quarter-finals and came from 1–5 down to draw level with Barry Hawkins at 6–6. However, from 9–9 Maguire lost four frames in a row to be beaten 9–13.

Maguire's form continued to improve in the 2017–18 season. He reached the final of the Riga Masters in June, but lost 2–5 to Ryan Day. In December, with wins over Yuan Sijun, Jak Jones, Liang Wenbo, Graeme Dott, and Joe Perry, Maguire advanced to the semi-finals of the UK Championship again, but was defeated 4–6 by the eventual champion Ronnie O'Sullivan. Shortly after the UK Championship, he reached the quarter-finals of the Scottish Open but lost 2–5 against Judd Trump. In February, Maguire progressed to the semi-finals of another ranking event, this time at the World Grand Prix, but lost 4–6 to O'Sullivan despite leading 4–2. He qualified for the 2018 World Championship after beating Allan Taylor, Hammad Miah, and Hossein Vafaei, and faced Ronnie O'Sullivan in the first round. Despite leading 4–0 and 6–3, Maguire lost seven of the next eight frames in the second session and eventually lost 7–10.

=== 2018–present: Tour Championship winner (2020) ===
Maguire made a strong start to the 2018–19 season; with wins against Joe Perry and Kyren Wilson, he reached the semi-finals of the Riga Masters but lost 1–5 to Jack Lisowski. In October, he advanced to the semi-finals of another ranking event, the English Open, but this time lost 3–6 to Stuart Bingham. He performed fairly well at the UK Championship where he progressed to the quarter-finals, but was beaten 1–6 by Mark Allen. Maguire returned to the Masters for the first time since 2015; however, he was outscored 712–190 by his opponent Mark Selby and lost 2–6. He reached his third semi-final of the season at the German Masters in February, but was defeated by Kyren Wilson 6–1. At the 2019 World Championship, Maguire won both of his first two rounds against Tian Pengfei and James Cahill, the latter ending in a final-frame decider, but was unable to replicate the same feat against Judd Trump in the quarter-finals, losing 6–13.

In September 2019, Maguire won the Six-red World Championship for the second time, after beating his fellow countryman John Higgins 8–6 in the final. In December, he reached the final of the UK Championship for the third time, his first appearance in the final since 2007. Despite losing the first four frames to his opponent, Ding Junhui, Maguire managed to recover to 3–5 at the end of the first session. In the second session, after making back-to-back centuries, he was only 6–8 behind but lost two more frames and the match 6–10. The highlight of the extended 2019–20 season for Maguire was the Tour Championship in June, where he beat Mark Allen 10–6 in the final, to secure the £150,000 winner's prize and his first ranking event title since 2013. At the 2020 World Championship, he was defeated 3–10 by Martin Gould. Maguire began 2021 with a win over Mark Selby at the Masters, before a 5–6 loss to eventual champion Yan Bingtao.

At the 2022 Masters, Maguire was beaten in the first round by Mark Selby 3–6. At the 2022 World Championship, Maguire beat rival Shaun Murphy in the first round 10–8. He went on to reach the quarter-final where he lost heavily to Ronnie O'Sullivan 5–13.

At the 2024 World Championship, Maguire beat Ali Carter 10‍–‍7 in the first round and Shaun Murphy 13‍–‍9 in the last 16. In the quarter-final he lost 8–13 to David Gilbert.

At the 2025 Championship League, Maguire beat Joe O'Connor 3–1 to win his seventh ranking event, five years after his last.

== Rivalry ==
Maguire has a professional rivalry with Shaun Murphy. In a match at the 2004 Grand Prix, Murphy was involved in one of Maguire's frames being forfeited. As the match was about to begin, Maguire realised he had forgotten to bring his chalk with him so he asked referee Johan Oomen for permission to leave the arena. Murphy spoke to the referee while Maguire was away; the tournament director Mike Ganley was summoned, and he docked Maguire a frame for not being ready to start at the scheduled time. Maguire later won the match 5–2.

A few weeks later, while playing in the final of the 2004 UK Championship, David Gray forgot to bring his chalk into the arena. However, Maguire allowed Gray to retrieve it without a frame being docked. After beating Murphy in the 2007 Welsh Open, Maguire said, "That put the icing on the cake, but we've always had a rivalry. I dislike him and I think he dislikes me. I try hard to beat everyone, but it would have hurt more if I'd lost to him."

== Personal life ==
Maguire is married and has three children. Unlike fellow professionals, he is permitted to play with his collar open and not wear a bow tie in competition because of a neck condition. Maguire was formally detained by Strathclyde Police on 27 August 2009, following allegations that he and countryman Jamie Burnett had colluded to produce a 9–3 victory for Maguire at their clash in the 2008 UK Championship; they were both released without charge.

== Performance and rankings timeline ==
Tournament	1997/ 98	1998/ 99	1999/ 00	2000/ 01	2001/ 02	2002/ 03	2003/ 04	2004/ 05	2005/ 06	2006/ 07	2007/ 08	2008/ 09	2009/ 10	2010/ 11	2011/ 12	2012/ 13	2013/ 14	2014/ 15	2015/ 16	2016/ 17	2017/ 18	2018/ 19	2019/ 20	2020/ 21	2021/ 22	2022/ 23	2023/ 24	2024/ 25	2025/ 26	2026/ 27
Ranking (Note: It shows the ranking at the beginning of the season)	(Note: He was an amateur)	(Note: New players don't have a ranking)	193	100	52	52	41	24	3	9	10	2	2	6	8	4	5	14	15	18	24	17	16	9	9	24	30	31	27	29
Ranking tournaments
Championship League	Tournament Not Held										Non-Ranking Event													RR	RR	2R	A	RR	W	2R
China Open (Note: The event was called the China International (1997/1998–1998/1999))	NR	A	LQ	1R	LQ	Not Held		LQ	1R	2R	W	1R	2R	1R	F	SF	WD	3R	SF	QF	1R	2R	Tournament Not Held							LQ
Wuhan Open	Tournament Not Held																										3R	LQ	3R	2R
British Open	A	A	2R	LQ	LQ	3R	2R	F	Tournament Not Held																4R	LQ	1R	3R	LQ	LQ
English Open	Tournament Not Held																			2R	1R	SF	1R	1R	LQ	LQ	2R	2R	1R	A
Shenzhen Open (Note: The event was called the Xi'an Grand Prix (2024/2025–2025/2026))	Tournament Not Held																											1R	2R	2R
Northern Ireland Open	Tournament Not Held																			1R	2R	1R	4R	3R	3R	3R	QF	1R	2R	1R
International Championship	Tournament Not Held															2R	1R	1R	LQ	2R	2R	2R	2R	Not Held			QF	LQ	SF	3R
UK Championship	A	A	1R	LQ	LQ	2R	2R	W	3R	3R	F	SF	SF	QF	QF	2R	QF	SF	4R	4R	SF	QF	F	3R	3R	LQ	LQ	1R	1R	
Shoot Out	Tournament Not Held													Non-Ranking Event						A	A	A	A	A	A	1R	A	A	1R	
Scottish Open (Note: The event was called the Players Championship (2003/2004))	A	A	LQ	2R	1R	1R	LQ	Tournament Not Held								MR	Not Held			3R	QF	1R	2R	1R	QF	2R	A	3R	1R	
German Masters (Note: The event was called the German Open (1997/1998))	A	NR	Tournament Not Held											QF	F	1R	2R	SF	QF	1R	LQ	SF	LQ	1R	1R	LQ	1R	1R	LQ	WD
Welsh Open	A	A	LQ	LQ	LQ	LQ	1R	2R	2R	SF	2R	QF	SF	F	QF	W	4R	QF	1R	2R	2R	1R	4R	SF	LQ	1R	LQ	F	2R	
World Grand Prix	Tournament Not Held																	NR	1R	1R	SF	2R	1R	DNQ	QF	DNQ	1R	WD	1R	
Players Championship (Note: The event was called the Players Tour Championship Grand Final (2010/2011–2015/2016))	Tournament Not Held													WD	SF	1R	1R	2R	DNQ	DNQ	1R	1R	SF	DNQ	DNQ	DNQ	DNQ	DNQ	DNQ	
World Open (Note: The event was called the Grand Prix (1997/1998–2000/2001 and 2004/2005–2009/2010) and the LG Cup (2001/2002–2003/2004))	A	A	LQ	LQ	1R	LQ	LQ	QF	1R	RR	2R	1R	2R	QF	1R	2R	1R	Not Held		1R	2R	2R	WD	Not Held			3R	LQ	WD	
Tour Championship	Tournament Not Held																					DNQ	W	DNQ	DNQ	DNQ	DNQ	DNQ	DNQ	
World Championship	LQ	LQ	LQ	LQ	LQ	LQ	1R	1R	2R	SF	QF	QF	2R	1R	SF	1R	1R	1R	1R	QF	1R	QF	1R	1R	QF	LQ	QF	LQ	LQ	
Non-ranking tournaments
Shanghai Masters	Tournament Not Held										Ranking Event											2R	1R	Not Held			A	A	A	A
Champion of Champions	Tournament Not Held																QF	1R	QF	A	A	A	1R	1R	1R	A	A	A	1R	
The Masters	LQ	A	LQ	LQ	LQ	LQ	LQ	WR	1R	SF	QF	SF	SF	1R	1R	1R	SF	QF	1R	A	A	1R	QF	QF	1R	A	A	A	A	
Championship League	Tournament Not Held										A	A	SF	RR	A	RR	SF	RR	2R	A	RR	RR	A	A	A	RR	A	A	A	
Former ranking tournaments
Malta Grand Prix	Non-Ranking		LQ	NR	Tournament Not Held																									
Thailand Masters	A	A	LQ	LQ	LQ	NR	Not Held			NR	Tournament Not Held																			
Irish Masters	Non-Ranking Event					2R	1R	1R	NH	NR	Tournament Not Held																			
Northern Ireland Trophy	Tournament Not Held								NR	3R	W	QF	Tournament Not Held																	
Bahrain Championship	Tournament Not Held											QF	Tournament Not Held																	
Wuxi Classic (Note: The event was called the Jiangsu Classic (2008/2009–2009/2010))	Tournament Not Held											Non-Ranking Event				1R	A	QF	Tournament Not Held											
Australian Goldfields Open	Tournament Not Held														1R	A	A	1R	SF	Tournament Not Held										
Shanghai Masters	Tournament Not Held										2R	SF	1R	2R	1R	2R	1R	2R	1R	SF	3R	Non-Ranking		Not Held			Non-Ranking Event			
Indian Open	Tournament Not Held																SF	A	NH	QF	1R	A	Tournament Not Held							
Riga Masters (Note: The event was called the Riga Open (2014/2015–2015/2016))	Tournament Not Held																	Minor-Rank		LQ	F	SF	LQ	Tournament Not Held						
China Championship	Tournament Not Held																			NR	3R	1R	2R	Tournament Not Held						
Turkish Masters	Tournament Not Held																								1R	Not Held				
Gibraltar Open	Tournament Not Held																		MR	2R	WD	A	WD	A	WD	Tournament Not Held				
WST Classic	Tournament Not Held																									2R	Tournament Not Held			
European Masters (Note: The event was called the Irish Open (1998/1999), the European Open (2001/2002–2003/2004) and the Malta Cup (2004/2005–2007/2008))	NH	A	Not Held		1R	LQ	W	2R	QF	2R	NR	Tournament Not Held								LQ	LQ	LQ	LQ	3R	LQ	LQ	A	Not Held		
Saudi Arabia Masters	Tournament Not Held																											4R	5R	NH
Former non-ranking tournaments
Scottish Masters	A	A	LQ	LQ	LQ	A	Tournament Not Held																							
Northern Ireland Trophy	Tournament Not Held								QF	Ranking Event			Tournament Not Held																	
Pot Black	Tournament Not Held								QF	A	A	Tournament Not Held																		
Malta Cup	Tournament Not Held				Ranking Event						RR	Tournament Not Held								Ranking Event										
World Series Berlin	Tournament Not Held											SF	Tournament Not Held																	
World Series Grand Final	Tournament Not Held											SF	Tournament Not Held																	
World Series Prague	Tournament Not Held												SF	Tournament Not Held																
Beijing International Challenge	Tournament Not Held												F	SF	Tournament Not Held															
Scottish Professional Championship	Tournament Not Held													QF	Tournament Not Held															
Wuxi Classic	Tournament Not Held											A	A	A	QF	Ranking Event			Tournament Not Held											
Power Snooker	Tournament Not Held													A	1R	Tournament Not Held														
Premier League	A	A	A	A	A	A	A	A	RR	A	A	A	A	A	A	A	Tournament Not Held													
World Grand Prix	Tournament Not Held																	2R	Ranking Event											
Shoot Out	Tournament Not Held													1R	3R	SF	1R	1R	A	Ranking Event										
Romanian Masters	Tournament Not Held																				QF	Tournament Not Held								
Six-red World Championship (Note: The event was called the Six-red Snooker International (2008/2009) and the Six-red World Grand Prix (2009/2010))	Tournament Not Held											A	A	A	NH	RR	2R	W	2R	SF	RR	2R	W	Not Held		RR	Tournament Not Held			

Performance Table Legend
LQ	lost in the qualifying draw	#R	lost in the early rounds of the tournament (WR = Wildcard round, RR = Round robin)	QF	lost in the quarter-finals
SF	lost in the semi-finals	F	lost in the final	W	won the tournament
DNQ	did not qualify for the tournament	A	did not participate in the tournament	WD	withdrew from the tournament

NH / Not Held	means an event was not held.
NR / Non-Ranking Event	means an event is/was no longer a ranking event.
R / Ranking Event	means an event is/was a ranking event.
MR / Minor-Ranking Event	means an event is/was a minor-ranking event.
PA / Pro-am Event	means an event is/was a pro-am event.

== Career finals ==
=== Ranking finals: 15 (7 titles) ===
Legend
UK Championship (1–2)
Other (6–6)

Outcome	No.	Year	Championship	Opponent in the final	Score
Winner	1.	2004	European Open	(England) Jimmy White	9–3
Runner-up	1.	2004	British Open	(Scotland) John Higgins	6–9
Winner	2.	2004	UK Championship	(England) David Gray	10–1
Winner	3.	2007	Northern Ireland Trophy	(Republic of Ireland) Fergal O'Brien	9–5
Runner-up	2.	2007	UK Championship	(England) Ronnie O'Sullivan	2–10
Winner	4.	2008	China Open	(England) Shaun Murphy	10–9
Runner-up	3.	2011	Welsh Open	(Scotland) John Higgins	6–9
Runner-up	4.	2012	German Masters	(England) Ronnie O'Sullivan	7–9
Runner-up	5.	2012	China Open	(England) Peter Ebdon	9–10
Winner	5.	2013	Welsh Open	(England) Stuart Bingham	9–8
Runner-up	6.	2017	Riga Masters	(Wales) Ryan Day	2–5
Runner-up	7.	2019	UK Championship (2)	(China) Ding Junhui	6–10
Winner	6.	2020	Tour Championship	(Northern Ireland) Mark Allen	10–6
Runner-up	8.	2025	Welsh Open (2)	(England) Mark Selby	6–9
Winner	7.	2025	Championship League	(England) Joe O'Connor	3–1

=== Minor-ranking finals: 6 (3 titles) ===
Outcome	No.	Year	Championship	Opponent in the final	Score
Runner-up	1.	2010	Players Tour Championship – Event 1	(Wales) Mark Williams	0–4
Runner-up	2.	2010	MIUS Cup	(England) Stephen Lee	2–4
Winner	1.	2012	FFB Snooker Open	(England) Joe Perry	4–2
Winner	2.	2012	Players Tour Championship – Event 1	(England) Jack Lisowski	4–3
Runner-up	3.	2012	Players Tour Championship – Event 2	(England) Martin Gould	3–4
Winner	3.	2014	Lisbon Open	(England) Matthew Selt	4–2

=== Non-ranking finals: 6 (4 titles) ===
Outcome	No.	Year	Championship	Opponent in the final	Score
Runner-up	1.	2002	Merseyside Professional Championship	(England) Mark Davis	2–5
Winner	1.	2003	Merseyside Professional Championship	(England) Mark Davis	5–1
Runner-up	2.	2009	Beijing International Challenge	(China) Liang Wenbo	6–7
Winner	2.	2009	Pro Challenge Series – Event 1	(Scotland) Alan McManus	5–2
Winner	3.	2014	Six-red World Championship	(England) Ricky Walden	8–7
Winner	4.	2019	Six-red World Championship (2)	(Scotland) John Higgins	8–6

=== Team finals: 2 (1 title) ===
Outcome	No.	Year	Championship	Team	Partner	Opponent(s) in the final	Score
Runner-up	1.	2015	World Cup	Scotland	John Higgins	China B	1–4
Winner	1.	2019	World Cup	Scotland	John Higgins	China B	4–0

=== Amateur finals: 1 (1 title) ===
Outcome	No.	Year	Championship	Opponent in the final	Score
Winner	1.	2000	World Amateur Championship	(England) Luke Fisher	11–5
