= 2018 World Grand Prix (snooker) =

Snooker tournament

2018 Ladbrokes World Grand Prix
Tournament information
- Dates: 19–25 February 2018
- Venue: Preston Guild Hall
- City: Preston
- Country: England
- Organisation: World Snooker
- Format: Ranking event
- Total prize fund: £375,000
- Winner's share: £100,000
- Highest break: Mark Joyce (ENG) (140)

Final
- Champion: Ronnie O'Sullivan (ENG)
- Runner-up: Ding Junhui (CHN)
- Score: 10–3

The 2018 World Grand Prix (officially the 2018 Ladbrokes World Grand Prix) was a professional ranking snooker tournament, taking place from 19 to 25 February 2018 at the Guild Hall in Preston, England. It was the fifteenth ranking event of the 2017/2018 season.

Barry Hawkins was the defending champion, but he did not qualify for this edition of the tournament.

Ronnie O'Sullivan won his fourth ranking title of the season and 32nd ranking title overall, beating Ding Junhui 10–3 in the final.

== Prize fund ==
The breakdown of prize money for this year is shown below:

- Winner: £100,000
- Runner-up: £40,000
- Semi-final: £20,000
- Quarter-final: £12,500
- Last 16: £7,500
- Last 32: £5,000
- Highest break: £5,000
- Total: £375,000

The "rolling 147 prize" for a maximum break stood at £15,000

== Seeding list ==
The top 32 players on the one-year ranking list, running from the 2017 Riga Masters until the 2018 Snooker Shoot Out, qualified for the tournament.

| Rank | Player | Total points |
|---|---|---|
| 1 | (England) Ronnie O'Sullivan | 425,500 |
| 2 | (Wales) Mark Williams | 259,000 |
| 3 | (England) Judd Trump | 234,500 |
| 4 | (Belgium) Luca Brecel | 232,600 |
| 5 | (England) Shaun Murphy | 209,500 |
| 6 | (England) Mark Selby | 198,225 |
| 7 | (China) Ding Junhui | 177,000 |
| 8 | (Scotland) John Higgins | 171,000 |
| 9 | (Northern Ireland) Mark Allen | 164,000 |
| 10 | (England) Kyren Wilson | 134,725 |
| 11 | (Australia) Neil Robertson | 132,000 |
| 12 | (Wales) Ryan Day | 129,500 |
| 13 | (Scotland) Stephen Maguire | 114,000 |
| 14 | (Scotland) Graeme Dott | 106,000 |
| 15 | (Scotland) Anthony McGill | 99,000 |
| 16 | (England) Martin Gould | 98,500 |
| 17 | (China) Yan Bingtao | 96,500 |
| 18 | (China) Cao Yupeng | 91,000 |
| 19 | (England) Joe Perry | 85,500 |
| 20 | (China) Li Hang | 84,000 |
| 21 | (England) Jack Lisowski | 83,600 |
| 22 | (England) David Gilbert | 71,500 |
| 23 | (England) Mark Joyce | 71,000 |
| 24 | (China) Xiao Guodong | 69,500 |
| 25 | (England) Ali Carter | 69,000 |
| 26 | (England) Mark King | 68,725 |
| 27 | (England) Jimmy Robertson | 64,000 |
| 28 | (England) Ricky Walden | 61,600 |
| 29 | (Cyprus) Michael Georgiou | 61,500 |
| 30 | (Wales) Michael White | 61,500 |
| 31 | (England) Stuart Bingham | 58,500 |
| 32 | (England) Robert Milkins | 57,000 |

== Main draw ==
Last 32; Best of 7 frames
1 | (England) Ronnie O'Sullivan | 4
32 | (England) Robert Milkins | 0
16 | (England) Martin Gould | 2
17 | (China) Yan Bingtao | 4
9 | (Northern Ireland) Mark Allen | 3
24 | (China) Xiao Guodong | 4
8 | (Scotland) John Higgins | 4
25 | (England) Ali Carter | 3
5 | (England) Shaun Murphy | 4
28 | (England) Ricky Walden | 1
12 | (Wales) Ryan Day | 3
21 | (England) Jack Lisowski | 4
13 | (Scotland) Stephen Maguire | 4
20 | (China) Li Hang | 0
4 | (Belgium) Luca Brecel | 0
29 | (Cyprus) Michael Georgiou | 4
3 | (England) Judd Trump | 1
30 | (Wales) Michael White | 4
14 | (Scotland) Graeme Dott | 2
19 | (England) Joe Perry | 4
11 | (Australia) Neil Robertson | 4
22 | (England) David Gilbert | 1
6 | (England) Mark Selby | 4
27 | (England) Jimmy Robertson | 3
7 | (China) Ding Junhui | 4
26 | (England) Mark King | 1
10 | (England) Kyren Wilson | 3
23 | (England) Mark Joyce | 4
15 | (Scotland) Anthony McGill | 4
18 | (China) Cao Yupeng | 1
2 | (Wales) Mark Williams | 2
31 | (England) Stuart Bingham | 4

Last 16; Best of 7 frames
1 | (England) Ronnie O'Sullivan | 4
17 | (China) Yan Bingtao | 3
24 | (China) Xiao Guodong | 4
8 | (Scotland) John Higgins | 3
5 | (England) Shaun Murphy | 4
21 | (England) Jack Lisowski | 2
13 | (Scotland) Stephen Maguire | 4
29 | (Cyprus) Michael Georgiou | 3
30 | (Wales) Michael White | 4
19 | (England) Joe Perry | 0
11 | (Australia) Neil Robertson | 0
6 | (England) Mark Selby | 4
7 | (China) Ding Junhui | 4
23 | (England) Mark Joyce | 1
15 | (Scotland) Anthony McGill | 4
31 | (England) Stuart Bingham | 1

Quarter-finals; Best of 9 frames
1 | (England) Ronnie O'Sullivan | 5
24 | (China) Xiao Guodong | 0
5 | (England) Shaun Murphy | 2
13 | (Scotland) Stephen Maguire | 5
30 | (Wales) Michael White | 2
6 | (England) Mark Selby | 5
7 | (China) Ding Junhui | 5
15 | (Scotland) Anthony McGill | 3

Semi-finals; Best of 11 frames
1 | (England) Ronnie O'Sullivan | 6
13 | (Scotland) Stephen Maguire | 4
6 | (England) Mark Selby | 5
7 | (China) Ding Junhui | 6

Final; Best of 19 frames
1 | (England) Ronnie O'Sullivan | 10
7 | (China) Ding Junhui | 3

== Final ==
Final: Best of 19 frames. Referee: Greg Coniglio; Guild Hall, Preston, England, 25 February 2018.
| Ronnie O'Sullivan (1); England | 10–3 | Ding Junhui (7); China |
Afternoon: 2–61, 79–22, 71–47, 42–81, 124–8 (124), 113–16 (105), 42–64, 81–37, 120–0 (120); Evening: 113–4, 79–6, 89–16, 83–9
| 124 | Highest break | 68 |
| 3 | Century breaks | 0 |

== Century breaks ==
Total: 26

- 140 – Mark Joyce
- 134, 134, 117, 104 – Ding Junhui
- 134 – Mark Selby
- 130 – Martin Gould
- 128, 124, 121, 120, 119, 106, 105, 105, 102, 101 – Ronnie O'Sullivan
- 125, 102 – Anthony McGill
- 123, 105 – Shaun Murphy
- 122 – Yan Bingtao
- 111 – Ryan Day
- 109 – Graeme Dott
- 103 – Stephen Maguire
- 102 – Neil Robertson
