= 2008 Malta Cup =

Tournament information
- Dates: 4–10 February 2008
- Venue: Hilton Conference Center
- City: Portomaso
- Country: Malta
- Organisation: WPBSA
- Format: Non-ranking event
- Total prize fund: £76,000
- Winner's share: £20,000
- Highest break: Shaun Murphy (ENG) (137)

Final
- Champion: (England) Shaun Murphy
- Runner-up: (Republic of Ireland) Ken Doherty
- Score: 9–3

The 2008 Malta Cup was a professional non-ranking snooker tournament that took place between 4 and 10 February 2008 at the Hilton Conference Center in Portomaso, Malta.

The Gambling Commission looked at allegations of match-fixing during the round-robin stage of the tournament.

Shaun Murphy won the title by defeating Ken Doherty 9–3 in the final.

== Prize fund ==
The breakdown of prize money for this year is shown below:

- Winner: £20,000
- Runner-Up: £9,000
- Semi-final: £4,500
- 2nd place in group: £2,750
- 3rd place in group: £2,500
- 4th place in group: £2,250
- 5th place in group: £2,000
- Maximum break: £10,000
- Total: £76,000

== Group stage ==
Group matches were played over 6 frames. A win was worth 2 points and a tie 1 point. The top player from each group qualified to the semi-finals.

=== Group 1 ===
| POS | Player | MP | MW | MT | ML | FW | FL | FD | PTS |
|---|---|---|---|---|---|---|---|---|---|
| 1 | (Scotland) John Higgins | 4 | 3 | 1 | 0 | 18 | 6 | +12 | 7 |
| 2 | (England) Joe Perry | 4 | 2 | 1 | 1 | 12 | 12 | 0 | 5 |
| 3 | (Wales) Ryan Day | 4 | 1 | 2 | 1 | 12 | 12 | 0 | 4 |
| 4 | (England) Ali Carter | 4 | 1 | 1 | 2 | 12 | 12 | 0 | 3 |
| 5 | (Malta) Alex Borg | 4 | 0 | 1 | 3 | 6 | 18 | −12 | 1 |

- John Higgins 6–0 Alex Borg
- Joe Perry 3–3 Ryan Day
- John Higgins 4–2 Ryan Day
- Ali Carter 5–1 Alex Borg
- Joe Perry 4–2 Alex Borg
- John Higgins 3–3 Ali Carter
- Joe Perry 4–2 Ali Carter
- Ryan Day 3–3 Alex Borg
- John Higgins 5–1 Joe Perry
- Ali Carter 2–4 Ryan Day

=== Group 2 ===
| POS | Player | MP | MW | MT | ML | FW | FL | FD | PTS |
|---|---|---|---|---|---|---|---|---|---|
| 1 | (Republic of Ireland) Ken Doherty | 4 | 4 | 0 | 0 | 18 | 6 | +12 | 8 |
| 2 | (Hong Kong) Marco Fu | 4 | 2 | 1 | 1 | 15 | 9 | +6 | 5 |
| 3 | (Australia) Neil Robertson | 4 | 2 | 1 | 1 | 13 | 11 | +2 | 5 |
| 4 | (England) Stephen Lee | 4 | 1 | 0 | 3 | 9 | 15 | −6 | 2 |
| 5 | (Northern Ireland) Joe Swail | 4 | 0 | 0 | 4 | 5 | 19 | −14 | 0 |

- Ken Doherty 4–2 Marco Fu
- Neil Robertson 5–1 Stephen Lee
- Ken Doherty 4–2 Stephen Lee
- Joe Swail 1–5 Marco Fu
- Ken Doherty 5–1 Joe Swail
- Neil Robertson 3–3 Marco Fu
- Neil Robertson 4–2 Joe Swail
- Stephen Lee 1–5 Marco Fu
- Ken Doherty 5–1 Neil Robertson
- Joe Swail 1–5 Stephen Lee

=== Group 3 ===
| POS | Player | MP | MW | MT | ML | FW | FL | FD | PTS |
|---|---|---|---|---|---|---|---|---|---|
| 1 | (England) Shaun Murphy | 4 | 4 | 0 | 0 | 19 | 5 | +14 | 8 |
| 2 | (Scotland) Stephen Hendry | 4 | 2 | 1 | 1 | 12 | 12 | 0 | 5 |
| 3 | (Scotland) Stephen Maguire | 4 | 1 | 2 | 1 | 12 | 12 | +0 | 4 |
| 4 | (England) Mark Selby | 4 | 1 | 1 | 2 | 11 | 13 | −2 | 3 |
| 5 | (Malta) Tony Drago | 4 | 0 | 0 | 4 | 6 | 18 | −12 | 0 |

- Shaun Murphy 6–0 Tony Drago
- Stephen Hendry 4–2 Mark Selby
- Stephen Maguire 4–2 Tony Drago
- Shaun Murphy 4–2 Mark Selby
- Stephen Hendry 4–2 Tony Drago
- Shaun Murphy 4–2 Stephen Maguire
- Mark Selby 4–2 Tony Drago
- Stephen Hendry 3–3 Stephen Maguire
- Shaun Murphy 5–1 Stephen Hendry
- Stephen Maguire 3–3 Mark Selby

=== Group 4 ===
| POS | Player | MP | MW | MT | ML | FW | FL | FD | PTS |
|---|---|---|---|---|---|---|---|---|---|
| 1 | (China) Ding Junhui | 4 | 3 | 1 | 0 | 17 | 7 | +10 | 7 |
| 2 | (Wales) Dominic Dale | 4 | 3 | 0 | 1 | 14 | 10 | +4 | 6 |
| 3 | (England) Peter Ebdon | 4 | 1 | 1 | 2 | 11 | 13 | −2 | 3 |
| 4 | (Wales) Mark Williams | 4 | 1 | 1 | 2 | 9 | 15 | −6 | 3 |
| 5 | (Scotland) Graeme Dott | 4 | 0 | 1 | 3 | 9 | 15 | −6 | 1 |

- Graeme Dott 2–4 Dominic Dale
- Peter Ebdon 2–4 Ding Junhui
- Graeme Dott 3–3 Ding Junhui
- Mark Williams 2–4 Dominic Dale
- Graeme Dott 2–4 Mark Williams
- Peter Ebdon 2–4 Dominic Dale
- Mark Williams 3–3 Peter Ebdon
- Ding Junhui 4–2 Dominic Dale
- Graeme Dott 2–4 Peter Ebdon
- Mark Williams 0–6 Ding Junhui

== Knock-out stage ==
Semi-finals; Best of 11 frames
(Scotland) John Higgins | 2
(Republic of Ireland) Ken Doherty | 6
(England) Shaun Murphy | 6
(China) Ding Junhui | 5

Final; Best of 17 frames
(Republic of Ireland) Ken Doherty | 3
(England) Shaun Murphy | 9

== Final ==
Final: Best of 17 frames Hilton Conference Center, Portomaso, Malta, 10 February 2008.
| Ken Doherty; Ireland | 3–9 | Shaun Murphy; England |
Afternoon: 91–1 (91), 24–57, 36–78, 8–100, 22–87, 75–44, 0–67, 39–56; Evening: 0–110 (75), 66–34, 30–74, 0–76 (76)
| 91 | Highest break | 76 |
| 0 | Century breaks | 0 |
| 1 | 50+ breaks | 2 |

== Century breaks ==
- 137, 110, 104 – Shaun Murphy
- 134, 127, 118 – Ken Doherty
- 129, 100 – Ali Carter
- 128, 103 – Peter Ebdon
- 127, 125, 125, 123, 106 – Ding Junhui
- 127, 110, 101 – Mark Selby
- 116, 107 – Neil Robertson
- 113 – Ryan Day
- 108, 106, 101 – Marco Fu
- 103 – Stephen Hendry
