= World Series of Snooker 2009/2010 =

Logo of the World Series of Snooker

The Sportingbet.com World Series of Snooker was played for the second season and final time in the 2009/2010 season. The World Series of Snooker were a series of invitational events. It was sponsored by sportingbet.com, but after the second event no others were held.

The winner of each tournament received five points, the runner-up three and losing semi-finalists one each. These points would have determined seeding positions for the Grand Finals.

== World Series of Snooker – Killarney ==
The first event of the World Series of Snooker 2009/2010 was held at the INEC, Killarney, Ireland between 16 and 17 May 2009.

Shaun Murphy won in the final 5–1 against Jimmy White.

=== Players ===
Professionals:

- (England) Shaun Murphy
- (Republic of Ireland) Ken Doherty
- (Scotland) John Higgins
- (England) Jimmy White

Wildcards:

- (Republic of Ireland) Greg Casey
- (Republic of Ireland) Tony Moore
- (Republic of Ireland) Andrew Gray
- (Republic of Ireland) Jason Devaney

=== Main draw ===
Quarter-finals; Best of 9 Frames
(England) Shaun Murphy	5
(Republic of Ireland) Greg Casey	0
(Scotland) John Higgins	5
(Republic of Ireland) Andrew Gray	1
(Republic of Ireland) Ken Doherty	5
(Republic of Ireland) Tony Moore	4
(England) Jimmy White	5
(Republic of Ireland) Jason Devaney	3

Semi-finals; Best of 9 Frames
(England) Shaun Murphy	5
(Scotland) John Higgins	3
(Republic of Ireland) Ken Doherty	4
(England) Jimmy White	5

Final; Best of 9 Frames
(England) Shaun Murphy	5
(England) Jimmy White	1

=== Century breaks ===
- 131, 129 – Shaun Murphy
- 118 – Ken Doherty
- 100 – Jimmy White

World Series of Snooker World Series of Snooker Killarney
Tournament information
- Dates: 16–17 May 2009
- Venue: INEC
- City: Killarney
- Country: Ireland
- Organisation: FSTC Sports Management
- Format: Non-ranking event
- Highest break: 131

Final
- Champion: (England) Shaun Murphy
- Runner-up: (England) Jimmy White
- Score: 5–1

== World Series of Snooker – Prague ==
The second and final event of the World Series of Snooker 2009/2010 was held at the Aréna Sparta Podvinný Mlýn, Prague, Czech Republic between 17 and 18 October 2009.

Jimmy White won in the final 5–3 against Graeme Dott

=== Players ===
Professionals:

- (Scotland) Stephen Maguire
- (Scotland) Graeme Dott
- (Scotland) John Higgins
- (England) Jimmy White

Wildcards:

- (Czech Republic) Krystof Michal
- (Czech Republic) Osip Zusmanovic
- (Czech Republic) Lukas Krenek
- (Czech Republic) Sishuo Wang

=== Main draw ===
Quarter-finals; Best of 9 Frames
(Scotland) Stephen Maguire	5
(Czech Republic) Kryštof Michal	0
(Scotland) Graeme Dott	5
(Czech Republic) Osip Zusmanovic	0
(Scotland) John Higgins	5
(Czech Republic) Lukáš Křenek	1
(England) Jimmy White	5
(Czech Republic) Sishuo Wang	0

Semi-finals; Best of 9 Frames
(Scotland) Stephen Maguire	1
(Scotland) Graeme Dott	5
(Scotland) John Higgins	1
(England) Jimmy White	5

Final; Best of 9 Frames
(Scotland) Graeme Dott	3
(England) Jimmy White	5

=== Century breaks ===
- 103 – Jimmy White
- 100 – Graeme Dott

World Series of Snooker World Series of Snooker Prague
Tournament information
- Dates: 17–18 October 2009
- Venue: Aréna Sparta Podvinný Mlýn
- City: Prague
- Country: Czech Republic
- Organisation: FSTC Sports; Management
- Format: Non-ranking event
- Highest break: 103

Final
- Champion: (England) Jimmy White
- Runner-up: (Scotland) Graeme Dott
- Score: 5–3

== Points table ==
Rank	Player	(Republic of Ireland)	(Czech Republic)	Total
1	(England) Jimmy White	3	5	8
2	(England) Shaun Murphy	5	–	5
3	(Scotland) Graeme Dott	–	3	3
4	(Scotland) John Higgins	1	1	2
5	(Republic of Ireland) Ken Doherty	1	–	1
6	(Scotland) Stephen Maguire	–	1	1
