= PMK Pro-Am =

Tournament information
- Venue: Minnesota Fats Snooker Club
- Location: Glasgow
- Country: Scotland
- Established: 2014
- Format: Pro–am
- Current champion: (Scotland) Graeme Dott

The PMK Pro-Am is a pro–am snooker tournament held at Minnesota Fats Snooker Club in Glasgow, Scotland. Established in 2014, the tournament remains the only pro-am snooker event in Scotland. The reigning champion is Graeme Dott who has won the title three times in total.

== Winners ==
Year	Winner	Runner-up	Final score
2014	(Scotland) John Higgins	(Scotland) Craig MacGillivray	4-2
2015	(Scotland) Anthony McGill	(Scotland) Michael Leslie	4-3
2016	(Scotland) Anthony McGill	(Scotland) Graeme Dott	4-2
2017	(Scotland) Graeme Dott	(Israel) Eden Sharav	4-3
2018	(Scotland) Graeme Dott	(Northern Ireland) Joe Swail	4-0
2019	(Scotland) Michael Collumb	(Scotland) Graeme Dott	4-3
2022	(Scotland) Graeme Dott	(England) Alfie Lee	4-1
