= 2016 World Grand Prix (snooker) =

Snooker tournament in Wales

2016 Ladbrokes World Grand Prix
Tournament information
- Dates: 8–13 March 2016
- Venue: Venue Cymru
- City: Llandudno
- Country: Wales
- Organisation: World Snooker
- Format: Ranking event
- Total prize fund: £300,000
- Winner's share: £100,000
- Highest break: Joe Perry (ENG) (133)

Final
- Champion: Shaun Murphy (ENG)
- Runner-up: Stuart Bingham (ENG)
- Score: 10–9

The 2016 World Grand Prix (officially the 2016 Ladbrokes World Grand Prix) was a professional ranking snooker tournament that took place between 8 and 13 March 2016 at the Venue Cymru in Llandudno, Wales. It was the seventh ranking event of the 2015/2016 season.

The defending champion Judd Trump lost 2–4 against Stuart Bingham in the last 16. Shaun Murphy beat Stuart Bingham 10–9 in the final to win the £100,000 first prize. The tournament was broadcast in the UK on ITV4.

== Prize fund ==
The breakdown of prize money for this year is shown below:

- Winner: £100,000
- Runner-up: £35,000
- Semi-final: £20,000
- Quarter-final: £10,000
- Last 16: £5,000
- Last 32: £2,500
- Highest break: £5,000
- Total: £300,000

The "rolling 147 prize" for a maximum break was won at the previous ranking event, the Welsh Open, and so stood at £5,000. The sponsor pledged to double the prize for a 147 break and so the prize was £10,000.

== Seeding list ==
The top 32 players on a one-year ranking system running from the 2015 Australian Goldfields Open until the 2016 Gdynia Open qualified for the tournament.

Rank	Player	Total points
1	(Scotland) John Higgins	201,975
2	(Australia) Neil Robertson	197,500
3	(England) Martin Gould	127,425
4	(England) Kyren Wilson	126,900
5	(England) Mark Selby	106,375
6	(China) Liang Wenbo	98,850
7	(Northern Ireland) Mark Allen	91,200
8	(England) David Gilbert	85,350
9	(England) Judd Trump	73,250
10	(Hong Kong) Marco Fu	69,975
11	(England) Ronnie O'Sullivan	61,500
12	(Belgium) Luca Brecel	59,925
13	(England) Joe Perry	55,250
14	(England) Shaun Murphy	53,975
15	(England) Ben Woollaston	50,750
16	(England) Matthew Selt	49,500
17	(Wales) Ryan Day	48,975
18	(China) Ding Junhui	45,425
19	(Wales) Michael White	45,200
20	(England) Barry Hawkins	45,025
21	(England) Ali Carter	44,550
22	(England) Michael Holt	44,450
23	(Thailand) Thepchaiya Un-Nooh	43,275
24	(Wales) Mark Williams	43,225
25	(England) Stuart Bingham	42,175
26	(England) David Grace	41,250
27	(Scotland) Graeme Dott	40,450
28	(England) Tom Ford	37,850
29	(Wales) Jamie Jones	37,400
30	(China) Tian Pengfei	37,000
31	(England) Peter Ebdon	34,425
32	(Scotland) Stephen Maguire	33,250

== Main draw ==
Last 32; Best of 7 frames
1	(Scotland) John Higgins	4
32	(Scotland) Stephen Maguire	0
16	(England) Matthew Selt	1
17	(Wales) Ryan Day	4
9	(England) Judd Trump	4
24	(Wales) Mark Williams	1
8	(England) David Gilbert	1
25	(England) Stuart Bingham	4
5	(England) Mark Selby	2
28	(England) Tom Ford	4
12	(Belgium) Luca Brecel	1
21	(England) Ali Carter	4
13	(England) Joe Perry	4
20	(England) Barry Hawkins	0
4	(England) Kyren Wilson	4
29	(Wales) Jamie Jones	2
3	(England) Martin Gould	4
30	(China) Tian Pengfei	0
14	(England) Shaun Murphy	4
19	(Wales) Michael White	0
11	(England) Ronnie O'Sullivan	3
22	(England) Michael Holt	4
6	(China) Liang Wenbo	4
27	(Scotland) Graeme Dott	1
7	(Northern Ireland) Mark Allen	4
26	(England) David Grace	2
10	(Hong Kong) Marco Fu	3
23	(Thailand) Thepchaiya Un-Nooh	4
15	(England) Ben Woollaston	3
18	(China) Ding Junhui	4
2	(Australia) Neil Robertson	3
31	(England) Peter Ebdon	4

Last 16; Best of 7 frames
1	(Scotland) John Higgins	3
17	(Wales) Ryan Day	4
9	(England) Judd Trump	2
25	(England) Stuart Bingham	4
28	(England) Tom Ford	0
21	(England) Ali Carter	4
13	(England) Joe Perry	4
4	(England) Kyren Wilson	1
3	(England) Martin Gould	1
14	(England) Shaun Murphy	4
22	(England) Michael Holt	2
6	(China) Liang Wenbo	4
7	(Northern Ireland) Mark Allen	2
23	(Thailand) Thepchaiya Un-Nooh	4
18	(China) Ding Junhui	4
31	(England) Peter Ebdon	0

Quarter-finals; Best of 7 frames
17	(Wales) Ryan Day	2
25	(England) Stuart Bingham	4
21	(England) Ali Carter	1
13	(England) Joe Perry	4
14	(England) Shaun Murphy	4
6	(China) Liang Wenbo	0
23	(Thailand) Thepchaiya Un-Nooh	3
18	(China) Ding Junhui	4

Semi-finals; Best of 11 frames
25	(England) Stuart Bingham	6
13	(England) Joe Perry	5
14	(England) Shaun Murphy	6
18	(China) Ding Junhui	3

Final; Best of 19 frames
25	(England) Stuart Bingham	9
14	(England) Shaun Murphy	10

== Final ==
Final: Best of 19 frames. Referee: Greg Coniglio. Venue Cymru, Llandudno, Wales, 13 March 2016.
Stuart Bingham (25); England	9–10	Shaun Murphy (14); England
Afternoon: 13–76, 50–66, 96–20 (68), 26–74, 4–93 (58), 77–62, 61–29 (55), 101–5 (93), 80–56 (74); Evening: 69–6 (68), 40–62 (52), 19–72, 85–2, 0–94 (94), 23–79, 65–54, 0–120 (120), 84–2, 0–72
93	Highest break	120
0	Century breaks	1
5	50+ breaks	4

== Century breaks ==
Total: 15

- 133, 125 – Joe Perry
- 122 – Judd Trump
- 120, 110 – Shaun Murphy
- 119 – Michael Holt
- 114 – Marco Fu
- 112 – Tom Ford
- 110 – Martin Gould
- 108 – Ding Junhui
- 107 – John Higgins
- 105 – Liang Wenbo
- 104, 103 – Ryan Day
- 103 – Ali Carter
