= 2007 Warsaw Snooker Tour =

Warsaw Snooker Tour
Tournament information
- Dates: 16–17 June 2007
- Venue: Torwar Hall
- City: Warsaw
- Country: Poland
- Organisation: FSTC Sports Management
- Format: Non-ranking event
- Highest break: (England) Steve Davis (120)

Final
- Champion: (England) Mark Selby
- Runner-up: (Scotland) John Higgins
- Score: 5–3

The 2007 Warsaw Snooker Tour was a non-ranking snooker tournament that took place between 16 and 17 June 2007 at the Torwar Hall in Warsaw, Poland. This was the curtain raiser for the World Series of Snooker which started the next season.

Mark Selby won in the final 5–3 against reigning world champion John Higgins.

== Players ==
Professionals:

- (Scotland) John Higgins
- (England) Steve Davis
- (Scotland) Graeme Dott
- (England) Mark Selby

Wild-cards:

- (Poland) Rafal Jewtuch
- (Poland) Marcin Nitschke
- (Poland) Jaroslaw Kowalski
- (Poland) Krzysztof Wrobel

== Main draw ==
Quarter-finals; Best of 7 frames
(Scotland) John Higgins	4
(Poland) Rafal Jewtuch	2
(England) Steve Davis	4
(Poland) Marcin Nitschke	2
(Scotland) Graeme Dott	4
(Poland) Jaroslaw Kowalski	2
(England) Mark Selby	4
(Poland) Krzysztof Wrobel	0

Semi-finals; Best of 9 frames
(Scotland) John Higgins	5
(England) Steve Davis	3
(Scotland) Graeme Dott	1
(England) Mark Selby	5

Final; Best of 9 frames
(Scotland) John Higgins	3
(England) Mark Selby	5

== Century Breaks ==
- 120 – Steve Davis
- 109 – John Higgins
- 101 – Marcin Nitschke
