= Graeme Dott =

Scottish former professional snooker player

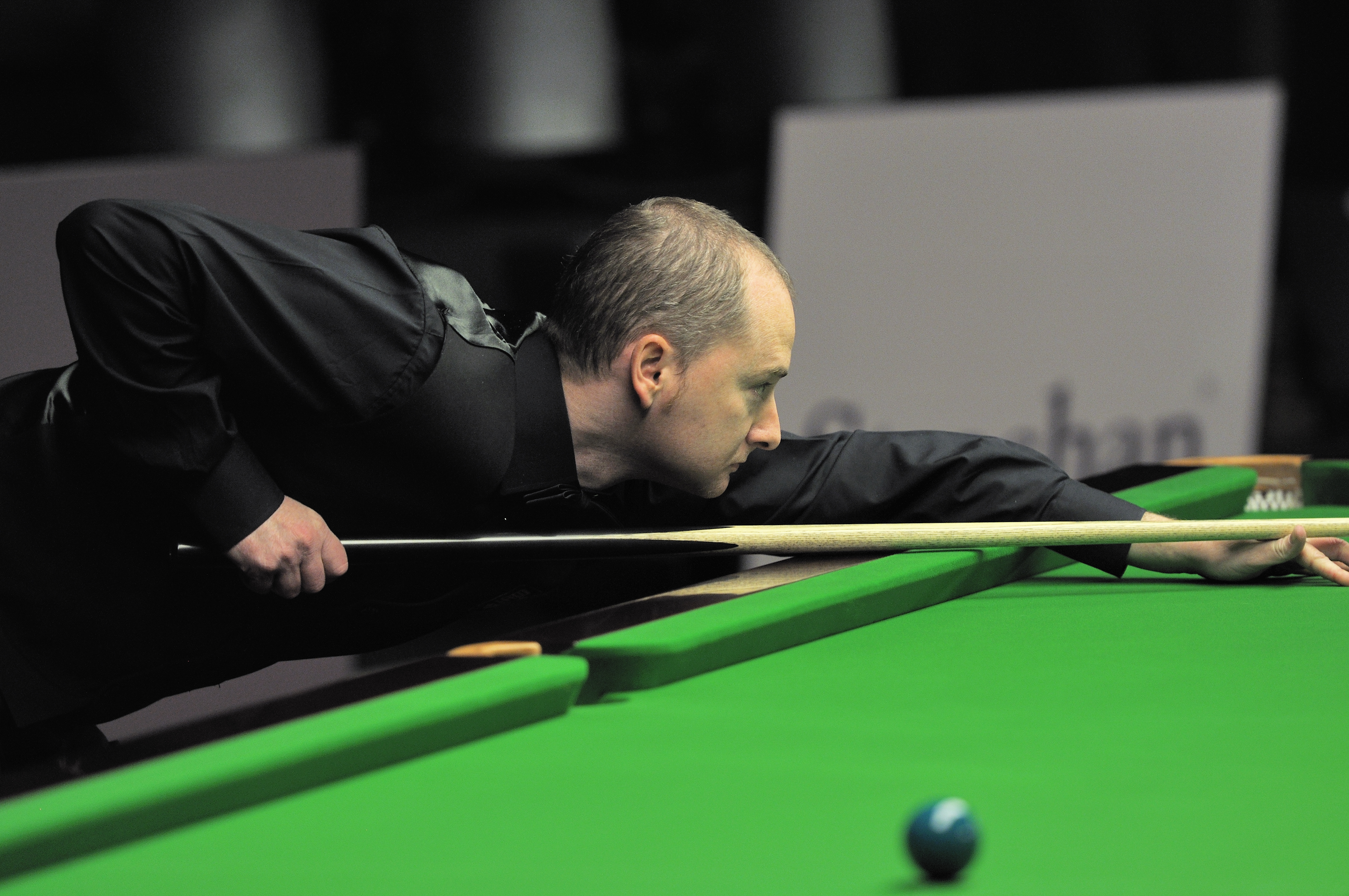
- Dott in 2014

Personal information
- Nickname: The Pocket Dynamo
- Born: 12 May 1977 (age 49) Easterhouse, Glasgow, Scotland

Sport
- Country: Scotland
- Sport: Snooker
- Professional: 1994–2026
- Highest ranking: 2 (2007/08)
- Maximum breaks: 2
- Century breaks: 271

Tournament wins
- Ranking: 2
- World Championship: 2006
- Criminal information
- Status: Incarcerated
- Convictions: Two counts of lewd, indecent and libidinous behavior
- Criminal charges: Lewd, indecent and libidinous behavior
- Penalty: 7 years' imprisonment

Details
- Date apprehended: 24 August 2026

Graeme Dott (born 12 May 1977) is a Scottish former professional snooker player and former World Snooker Champion. His career ended in 2026 after he was convicted of child sexual abuse.

Dott turned professional in 1994 and competed on the World Snooker Tour for over 30 years. He reached three World Snooker Championship finals, losing to Ronnie O'Sullivan in 2004, defeating Peter Ebdon to win the title in 2006, and losing to Neil Robertson in 2010. He contested a total of ten ranking finals, winning two ranking titles, and attained his highest position of second in the 2007–08 rankings. He made 271 century breaks in professional competition, including two maximums.

In April 2025, the World Professional Billiards and Snooker Association (WPBSA) suspended Dott from competition after he was charged with the historical sexual abuse of two children. In August 2026, after a five-day trial at Scotland's High Court, he was convicted of lewd and libidinous behaviour towards both victims. The WPBSA revoked his membership, removing him permanently from the sport, and the World Snooker Tour removed him from its Hall of Fame. In September 2026, he was sentenced to seven years in prison and placed on the sex offender register for life.

== Early life and amateur years ==
Graeme Dott was born on 12 May 1977 in Glasgow, Scotland, the youngest of four sons of John Dott and Susan Cartledge. Raised in the Easterhouse area of eastern Glasgow, he was educated at Commonhead Primary School and Lochend Secondary School. His father, grandfather, and uncle all worked for Yarrows Shipbuilders, and he described his background as "a traditional working-class Glasgow family."

Dott began playing snooker at age eight when he received a miniature snooker table for Christmas. A maternal uncle began taking him to snooker clubs so that he could practice on full-sized tables. When he was 13, his family moved to the Dennistoun area of Glasgow, and he made his first century break shortly afterwards at Dee Bee's Snooker Club. At Reardon's Snooker Centre on Stockwell Street, he met Alex Lambie, whose son Alex Jr. played alongside him in junior tournaments. Lambie, who owned a snooker club and hotel in Larkhall, mentored Dott as an amateur and went on to manage his professional career. Dott later described Lambie as a "second father".

In 1992, Dott won the British Under-19 Championship at the age of 15. The following year, he won the Scottish Amateur Championship. His parents separated when he was 16. He lived with his mother, while his father moved to a council house nearby.

== Career ==
=== Early career: From turning professional to World Champion (1994–2007) ===
Dott turned professional in 1994, at age 17. He made his Crucible debut at the 1997 World Snooker Championship, losing 9–10 in the first round to James Wattana. He reached his first ranking final at the 1999 Scottish Open, losing 1–9 to Stephen Hendry, and made his first maximum break in professional competition at the 1999 British Open. He reached his second ranking final at the 2001 British Open, losing 6–9 to John Higgins, and first entered the top 16 in the 2001–02 rankings. His appearance at the 2002 China Open attracted media attention when a series of delayed and missed flights extended his journey to Shanghai to 43 hours, after which he overslept for his match against Darren Morgan. After running part of the way to the tournament venue, Dott was docked two frames for arriving late and lost the match 3–5, commenting afterwards that he had left his hotel in such a hurry that he was not wearing underpants until a friend brought him a pair at the mid-session interval. The Guardian newspaper satirically named him its "Alternative Sports Personality of the Year 2002" over this episode. At the 2002 World Championship, he reached the second round of the tournament for the first time but suffered a 2–13 defeat to Higgins. Dott reached the second round again at the 2003 World Championship and built a 7–2 lead over Ken Doherty, but Doherty recovered to win 13–12.

Dott experienced a string of disappointing results the following season. After losing 1–5 to Dominic Dale at the 2004 Welsh Open, he deliberately broke his cue, a childhood gift from his parents, at a motorway service station on his way back to Scotland. Playing with a new cue, he began the 2004 World Championship as a 200–1 outsider, later commenting that he packed only two shirts for the event, anticipating an early exit. After coming from behind to defeat Mark King 10–9 in the first round, he beat Higgins in the second round, David Gray in the quarter-finals, and Matthew Stevens in the semi-finals. In the final, he faced Ronnie O'Sullivan. Dott won the first five frames, which O'Sullivan attributed to "mind games" by Derek Hill, Dott's coach, who had formerly coached O'Sullivan. Hill visited O'Sullivan in his dressing room 15 minutes before the final began, which O'Sullivan said "got into [his] head" and affected his focus. However, O'Sullivan dominated the remainder of the match, winning 18 of the last 21 frames for an 18–8 victory. The following year, Dott lost a fourth successive ranking final after Hendry beat him 9–7 at the 2005 Malta Cup. He exited the 2005 World Championship in the first round, losing 9–10 to Ian McCulloch.

At the 2006 World Championship, Dott led Neil Robertson 10–6 and 12–8 in the quarter-finals and held off a comeback to win 13–12. He faced O'Sullivan in the semi-finals. The scores were tied at 8–8 after the second session, but Dott won all eight frames in the third session to lead 16–8 and went on to win 17–11. Facing Peter Ebdon in the final, he led 11–5 and 15–7. Ebdon won six consecutive frames to reduce Dott's lead to two at 15–13, but Dott secured an 18–14 victory, claiming his first ranking title and only world title. The final was noted for its lengthy duration, slow pace of play, and low scoring, with Dott producing a highest break in the match of just 68. The 27th frame was, at that time, the longest ever played at the Crucible, at 74 minutes. The first day's play ended at 12:45 a.m., and the second day's play finished at 12:53 a.m.

The following season, Dott reached the semi-finals of the 2006 UK Championship, his career-best performance at the tournament, but lost 7–9 to Hendry despite having led 7–5. At the 2007 China Open, he defeated O'Sullivan 6–2 in the semi-finals and Jamie Cope 9–5 in the final to win his second ranking title, which he dedicated to the memory of his late father-in-law and manager Alex Lambie, who had recently died of cancer. At the 2007 World Championship, he again lost to McCulloch in the first round, becoming the 14th first-time champion to fall victim to the "Crucible curse." He reached his career-highest ranking of second in the 2007–08 rankings.

=== Mid-career: Struggles with form and third world final (2007–20) ===
Dott reached the semi-finals of the 2007 Shanghai Masters but did not win any further matches for the remainder of the 2007–08 season. He later explained that depression, which he attributed to Lambie's death, had affected his form. His first-round loss to Ebdon at the 2008 Malta Cup was his 11th consecutive professional defeat, after which he described his play as "hopeless". After losing in the first round of the 2008 Welsh Open, he announced that he was considering missing the 2008 World Championship. He did participate in the tournament but lost 7–10 to Joe Perry in the first round. In the 2008–09 rankings, he fell from second to 13th place. His 2008–09 season began with another setback as he broke his left arm playing football, forcing him to withdraw from the 2008 Shanghai Masters and the 2008 Grand Prix. At the 2009 World Championship, he reached the second round but lost 10–13 to Mark Selby. He fell further to 28th place in the 2009–10 rankings.

In the 2009–10 season, Dott reached the last 16 of just one ranking event prior to the 2010 World Championship. However, he performed strongly at the Crucible, defeating Mark Allen 13–12 in the quarter-finals and Selby 17–14 in the semi-finals to reach his third world final. He lost 13–18 to Robertson in another lengthy final that ended at 12:54 a.m., but his ranking points as runner-up enabled him to re-enter the top 16 in the 2010–11 rankings. The following season, he reached the semi-finals of the 2011 German Masters but lost 4–6 to Selby. At the 2011 World Championship, he lost in the quarter-finals to eventual runner-up Judd Trump. Dott struggled in the 2011–12 season, losing the final of the non-ranking 2012 Snooker Shoot-Out to Barry Hawkins and reaching one ranking quarter-final at the 2012 World Open. At the 2012 World Championship, he lost 1–10 in the first round to Perry and described his performance as the worst he had ever played as a professional. Perry, who made a highest break in the match of just 59, acknowledged that he had also played poorly but said he felt sorry for Dott.

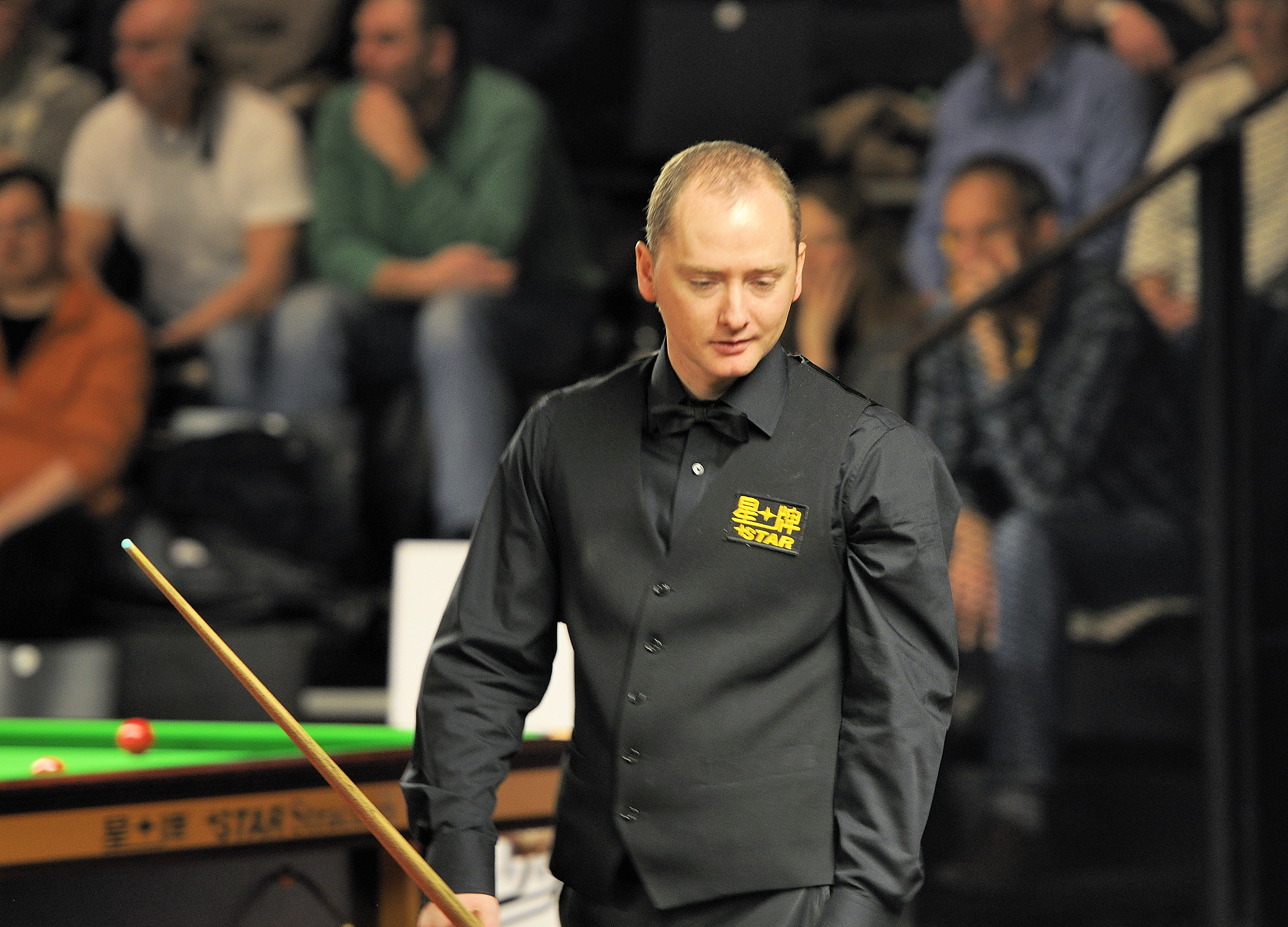
Dott at the 2014 German Masters.

At the 2013 Masters, Dott produced his career-best performance at the tournament, defeating Stephen Maguire 6–5 and Trump 6–1 to reach the semi-finals. Facing Selby, he led 4–1 before missing a pot on the black that would have given him a 5–1 lead, and Selby recovered to win 6–5. The 2013 World Championship was the last time Dott reached the Crucible as a top-16 seed. He defeated Ebdon 10–6 in a first-round match that lasted over seven hours; an extra session had to be added after the players failed to complete the match in the first two sessions. Afterwards, Dott criticised Ebdon's slow, deliberate style of play and called for a rule to limit the amount of time a player could spend over a shot. Facing Shaun Murphy in the second round, he recovered from 2–6 behind to tie the scores at 8–8, but Murphy won 13–11.

In the 2013–14 season, Dott reached the semi-finals of the 2013 International Championship but lost 7–9 to eventual winner Ding Junhui. He reached the quarter-finals of the 2014 World Open but lost 4–5 to Murphy, who fluked the final black in the deciding frame. At the 2014 China Open, he reached the quarter-finals but lost 3–5 to the world number one Robertson. Having fallen out of the top 16 after the 2014 German Masters, he competed in qualifying for the 2014 World Championship but lost 7–10 to Kyren Wilson in the last qualifying round. This ended his streak of 14 consecutive appearances since 2000.

At the 2014 UK Championship, Dott defeated Robertson in a deciding frame to reach the quarter-finals of the tournament for the first time since 2006. He took a 4–1 lead over Stuart Bingham in their quarter-final match but lost 5–6. Ranked 16th after the UK Championship, Dott dropped to 17th after the 2015 German Masters and never regained his top-16 standing thereafter. He qualified for the main stage of the 2015 World Championship and defeated Ricky Walden 10–8 in the first round, but he lost 5–13 in the second round to the eventual champion Bingham. The following season, Dott reached his first ranking semi-final in over two years at the 2016 German Masters but lost 2–6 to Martin Gould. He qualified for the 2016 World Championship but lost 4–10 to Mark Williams in the first round.

Dott did not reach the latter stages of a ranking event during the 2016–17 season. He qualified again for the 2017 World Championship and defeated Ali Carter 10–7 in the first round but lost 6–13 to Hawkins in the second round. The following season, he reached ranking finals at the 2018 German Masters, losing 1–9 to Williams, and the 2018 Snooker Shoot Out, losing to Michael Georgiou. He qualified for the 2018 World Championship, where he again faced Carter in the first round. Dott took a 6–2 lead, but Carter won eight of the last ten frames for a 10–8 victory. Dott made his last Crucible appearance at the 2019 World Championship, after qualifying for a fifth consecutive year. Facing Bingham in the first round, he trailed 1–8 but recovered to tie the scores at 9–9. Bingham won the deciding frame after Dott missed the black off its spot. During the 2019–20 season, he reached the quarter-finals of the 2019 International Championship, the semi-finals of the 2020 German Masters, the final of the non-ranking 2019–20 Championship League, and the final of the 2020 World Grand Prix. The World Grand Prix final was the tenth and last ranking final of Dott's career. He lost 8–10 to Robertson, who made five centuries in the match.

=== Late career: Rankings decline, relegation, and removal from the sport (2020–26) ===
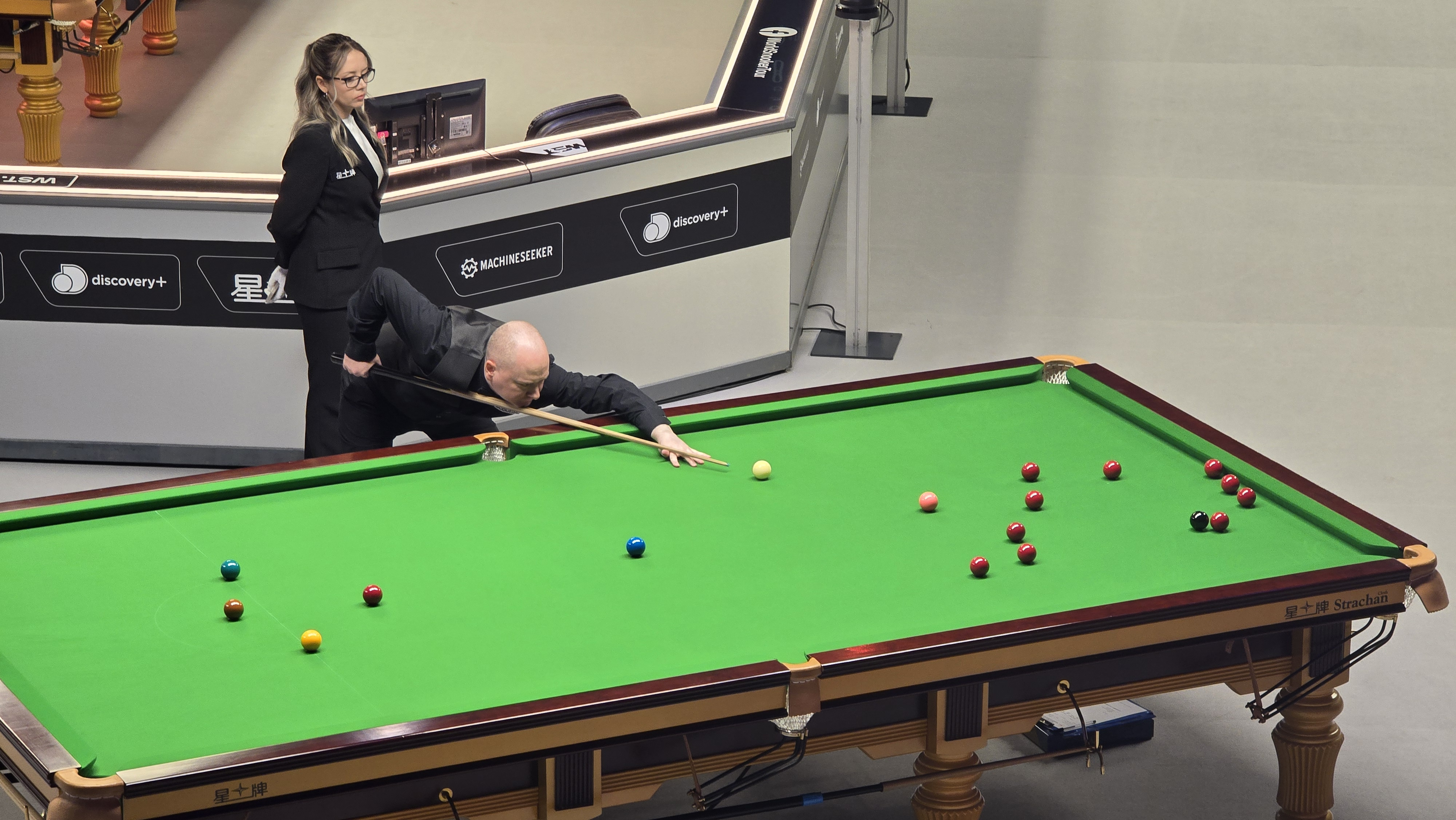
Dott at one of his last professional events, the 2025 German Masters.

Dott's career subsequently went into decline. He failed to qualify for the Crucible for five consecutive years, losing in the fourth and final qualifying round each year from 2020 to 2023 and in the third qualifying round in 2024. He made his second professional maximum break in the 2022 World Championship qualifiers, 23 years after his first at the 1999 British Open. He reached his last ranking semi-final at the 2022 European Masters and his last ranking quarter-final at the 2022 Turkish Masters. After ending the 2020–21 season ranked 18th, he fell down the world rankings, ending the 2021–22 season ranked 35th, the 2022–23 season ranked 41st, and the 2023–24 season ranked 54th.

Dott played his last professional match at the 2025 World Open in February 2025, losing 2–5 to Stan Moody in the last 64. On 9 April 2025, two days before he was scheduled to compete in the 2025 World Championship qualifiers, the World Professional Billiards and Snooker Association (WPBSA) announced that it had suspended him from competition due to ongoing court proceedings. He remained suspended for the entire 2025–26 season, which he ended outside the top 64 in the world rankings, resulting in his relegation from the professional tour. On 24 August 2026, he was convicted of child sexual abuse. The WPBSA held an emergency board meeting the same day, at which it voted unanimously to revoke his membership with immediate effect, permanently removing him from the sport. The following day, the World Snooker Tour removed him from its Hall of Fame.

== Personal life ==
In 1997, Dott began a relationship with Elaine Lambie, the 16-year-old daughter of his mentor and manager Alex Lambie. They married in 2003 and had their first child, a son, the following year. In late 2006, Dott's father-in-law died from cancer; in early 2007, his wife had a cancer scare and suffered a miscarriage. Following these events, Dott suffered from depression, which affected his motivation to practise and his performances in tournaments. His form improved again with the help of antidepressants. In 2008, he and his wife had a second child, a daughter. Following Dott's 2026 conviction for child sex offences, it was reported that he and his wife had separated but that she remained supportive of him.

Dott is a lifelong fan of Rangers. He paraded the 2006 World Championship trophy at Ibrox Stadium on 7 May 2006.

== Child sexual abuse convictions ==
In 2025, Dott was charged with historical child sex offences relating to two victims. He was charged with abusing a female victim between 1993 and 1996 in Glasgow, beginning when she was 9 and he was 16. The female victim had first made a statement to police in 2001, but no charges were brought at that time; she made a further statement in 2025. He was also charged with abusing a male victim between 2006 and 2010 in various locations in Lanarkshire, beginning when the boy was 8 and Dott was 28. Dott pleaded not guilty to the charges, which his lawyer claimed had been "fabricated," and stood trial at Scotland's High Court in August 2026.

During the five-day trial, the jury heard details of multiple sexual offences committed by Dott. The female victim, aged in her 40s at the time of the trial, described how he had touched her inappropriately when she was a child, exposed his genitals to her, and sexually assaulted her. The male victim, aged in his 20s at the time of the trial, testified that Dott had molested him in locations including a shower and a car and had given him crisps, fizzy drinks, and money. Dott called his victims' claims "disgusting" and denied "ever acting inappropriately with anyone".

On 24 August 2026, the jury found Dott guilty of lewd and libidinous behaviour towards both victims. Detective Inspector Gary Smillie, of Police Scotland, described Dott as a "dangerous individual". On 29 September, the judge, Lord Harrower, sentenced him to seven years in prison. The judge stated that Dott had engaged in penetrative sexual activity with both victims, noting that, in the case of the female victim, current legislation would classify his behaviour as rape. Dott was placed on the sex offender register for life. He continues to maintain his innocence. In October 2026 it was reported that he intends to appeal his conviction.

== Performance and rankings timeline ==
Tournament	1994/ 95	1995/ 96	1996/ 97	1997/ 98	1998/ 99	1999/ 00	2000/ 01	2001/ 02	2002/ 03	2003/ 04	2004/ 05	2005/ 06	2006/ 07	2007/ 08	2008/ 09	2009/ 10	2010/ 11	2011/ 12	2012/ 13	2013/ 14	2014/ 15	2015/ 16	2016/ 17	2017/ 18	2018/ 19	2019/ 20	2020/ 21	2021/ 22	2022/ 23	2023/ 24	2024/ 25	2025/ 26
Ranking (Note: It shows the ranking at the beginning of the season)	(Note: New players on the Main Tour don't have a ranking)	190	58	33	30	25	19	14	12	13	15	13	6	2	13	28	13	10	13	12	17	18	24	30	22	22	21	18	35	39	54	61
Ranking tournaments
Championship League	Tournament Not Held													Non-Ranking Event													2R	2R	RR	RR	RR	A
Saudi Arabia Masters	Tournament Not Held																														4R	A
Wuhan Open	Tournament Not Held																													WD	1R	A
English Open	Tournament Not Held																						1R	1R	1R	3R	1R	1R	LQ	2R	LQ	A
British Open	LQ	2R	1R	1R	2R	2R	2R	F	2R	2R	2R	Tournament Not Held																1R	3R	3R	2R	A
Xi'an Grand Prix	Tournament Not Held																														WD	A
Northern Ireland Open	Tournament Not Held																						1R	1R	1R	3R	1R	WD	LQ	1R	1R	A
International Championship	Tournament Not Held																		1R	SF	1R	3R	2R	1R	1R	QF	Not Held			LQ	LQ	A
UK Championship	LQ	LQ	LQ	LQ	2R	2R	2R	2R	3R	2R	QF	2R	SF	1R	2R	1R	2R	2R	2R	4R	QF	2R	2R	4R	3R	3R	4R	3R	LQ	LQ	LQ	A
Shoot Out	Tournament Not Held																Non-Ranking Event						2R	F	3R	WD	WD	1R	WD	3R	2R	A
Scottish Open (Note: The event was called the International Open (1994/1995–1996/1997) and the Players Championship (2003/2004))	1R	1R	1R	1R	F	SF	2R	2R	2R	3R	Tournament Not Held								MR	Not Held			2R	1R	4R	4R	1R	LQ	1R	LQ	1R	A
German Masters (Note: The event was called the German Open (1995/1996–1997/1998))	NH	LQ	LQ	1R	NR	Tournament Not Held											SF	2R	2R	2R	LQ	SF	LQ	F	LQ	SF	1R	LQ	LQ	2R	1R	A
World Grand Prix	Tournament Not Held																				NR	1R	DNQ	1R	DNQ	F	DNQ	DNQ	DNQ	DNQ	DNQ	DNQ
Players Championship (Note: The event was called the Players Tour Championship Grand Final (2010/2011–2015/2016))	Tournament Not Held																DNQ	2R	1R	DNQ	DNQ	1R	DNQ	1R	DNQ	1R	DNQ	DNQ	DNQ	DNQ	DNQ	DNQ
Welsh Open	1R	QF	1R	3R	1R	2R	1R	SF	1R	2R	3R	QF	3R	2R	2R	2R	QF	1R	2R	3R	3R	3R	3R	2R	1R	1R	2R	2R	1R	2R	1R	A
World Open (Note: The event was called the Grand Prix (1994/1995–2000/2001 and 2004/2005–2009/2010) and the LG Cup (2001/2002–2003/2004))	LQ	LQ	1R	LQ	1R	2R	SF	3R	2R	2R	3R	1R	RR	RR	WD	LQ	LQ	QF	2R	QF	Not Held		2R	1R	LQ	3R	Not Held			1R	1R	A
Tour Championship	Tournament Not Held																								DNQ	DNQ	DNQ	DNQ	DNQ	DNQ	DNQ	DNQ
World Championship	LQ	LQ	1R	LQ	LQ	1R	1R	2R	2R	F	1R	W	1R	1R	2R	F	QF	1R	2R	LQ	2R	1R	2R	1R	1R	LQ	LQ	LQ	LQ	LQ	WD	A
Non-ranking tournaments
The Masters	LQ	LQ	WD	LQ	LQ	LQ	LQ	1R	1R	1R	1R	QF	1R	1R	1R	A	QF	QF	SF	A	A	A	A	A	A	A	A	A	A	A	A	A
Championship League	Tournament Not Held													A	RR	A	RR	A	A	RR	A	WD	RR	WD	RR	F	SF	2R	RR	A	A	A
Former ranking tournaments
Asian Classic (Note: The event was called the Dubai Classic (1994/1995) and the Thailand Classic (1995/1996))	1R	LQ	LQ	Tournament Not Held																												
Malta Grand Prix	Non-Ranking Event					LQ	NR	Tournament Not Held																								
Thailand Masters (Note: The event was called the Thailand Open (1994/1995–1996/1997))	LQ	1R	1R	2R	LQ	LQ	LQ	1R	NR	Not Held			NR	Tournament Not Held																		
Irish Masters	Non-Ranking Event								1R	QF	1R	NH	NR	Tournament Not Held																		
Northern Ireland Trophy	Tournament Not Held											NR	QF	2R	2R	Tournament Not Held																
Bahrain Championship	Tournament Not Held														1R	Tournament Not Held																
Wuxi Classic (Note: The event was called the Jiangsu Classic (2008/2009–2009/2010))	Tournament Not Held														Non-Ranking Event				QF	1R	2R	Tournament Not Held										
Shanghai Masters	Tournament Not Held													SF	WD	1R	QF	1R	QF	1R	QF	1R	LQ	3R	Non-Ranking		Not Held			Non-Ranking		
Indian Open	Tournament Not Held																			LQ	3R	NH	1R	2R	3R	Tournament Not Held						
China Open (Note: The event was called the China International (1997/1998–1998/1999))	Not Held			NR	LQ	1R	1R	1R	Not Held		1R	2R	W	1R	QF	1R	1R	2R	2R	QF	2R	3R	1R	3R	LQ	Tournament Not Held						
Riga Masters (Note: The event was called the Riga Open (2014/2015–2015/2016))	Tournament Not Held																				Minor-Rank		2R	LQ	QF	2R	Tournament Not Held					
China Championship	Tournament Not Held																						NR	3R	3R	1R	Tournament Not Held					
WST Pro Series	Tournament Not Held																										RR	Tournament Not Held				
Turkish Masters	Tournament Not Held																											QF	Tournament Not Held			
WST Classic	Tournament Not Held																												1R	Not Held		
European Masters (Note: The event was called the European Open (1994/1995–1996/1997 and 2001/2002–2003/2004), the Irish Open (1998/1999) and the Malta Cup (2004/2005–2007/2008))	LQ	LQ	LQ	NH	1R	Not Held		2R	2R	2R	F	SF	QF	NR	Tournament Not Held								1R	2R	LQ	2R	2R	SF	1R	WD	Not Held	
Former non-ranking tournaments
Scottish Masters	A	A	A	A	LQ	LQ	LQ	LQ	LQ	Tournament Not Held																						
Northern Ireland Trophy	Tournament Not Held											1R	Ranking Event			Tournament Not Held																
Irish Masters	A	A	A	A	A	A	A	A	Ranking Event			NH	QF	Tournament Not Held																		
Warsaw Snooker Tour	Tournament Not Held													SF	Tournament Not Held																	
Pot Black	Tournament Not Held											A	QF	SF	Tournament Not Held																	
Malta Cup	Ranking Event			Tournament Not Held				Ranking Event						RR	Tournament Not Held								Ranking Event									
World Series Berlin	Tournament Not Held														W	Tournament Not Held																
World Series Grand Final	Tournament Not Held														SF	Tournament Not Held																
World Series Prague	Tournament Not Held															F	Tournament Not Held															
Hainan Classic	Tournament Not Held																SF	Tournament Not Held														
Scottish Professional Championship	Tournament Not Held																SF	Tournament Not Held														
Wuxi Classic	Tournament Not Held														A	A	A	QF	Ranking Event			Tournament Not Held										
Brazil Masters	Tournament Not Held																	F	Tournament Not Held													
Power Snooker	Tournament Not Held																A	QF	Tournament Not Held													
Premier League (Note: The event was called the European League (1994/1995–1996/1997))	A	A	A	A	A	A	A	A	A	A	A	A	SF	A	A	A	A	A	A	Tournament Not Held												
World Grand Prix	Tournament Not Held																				QF	Ranking Event										
Shoot Out	Tournament Not Held																2R	F	1R	SF	2R	1R	Ranking Event									
Six-red World Championship (Note: The event was called the Six-red Snooker International (2008/2009) and the Six-red World Grand Prix (2009/2010))	Tournament Not Held														A	A	A	NH	3R	A	2R	2R	A	QF	2R	2R	Not Held		LQ	Not Held		

Performance Table Legend
LQ	lost in the qualifying draw	#R	lost in the early rounds of the tournament (WR = Wildcard round, RR = Round robin)	QF	lost in the quarter-finals
SF	lost in the semi-finals	F	lost in the final	W	won the tournament
DNQ	did not qualify for the tournament	A	did not participate in the tournament	WD	withdrew from the tournament

NH / Not Held	means an event was not held.
NR / Non-Ranking Event	means an event is/was no longer a ranking event.
R / Ranking Event	means an event is/was a ranking event.
MR / Minor-Ranking Event	means an event is/was a minor-ranking event.
PA / Pro-am Event	means an event is/was a pro-am event.

== Career finals ==
=== Ranking finals: 10 (2 titles) ===
Legend
World Championship (1–2)
Other (1–6)

Outcome	No.	Year	Championship	Opponent in the final	Score	Ref.
Runner-up	1.	1999	Scottish Open	(Scotland) Stephen Hendry	1–9	
Runner-up	2.	2001	British Open	(Scotland) John Higgins	6–9	
Runner-up	3.	2004	World Snooker Championship	(England) Ronnie O'Sullivan	8–18	
Runner-up	4.	2005	Malta Cup	(Scotland) Stephen Hendry	7–9	
Winner	1.	2006	World Snooker Championship	(England) Peter Ebdon	18–14	
Winner	2.	2007	China Open	(England) Jamie Cope	9–5	
Runner-up	5.	2010	World Snooker Championship (2)	(Australia) Neil Robertson	13–18	
Runner-up	6.	2018	German Masters	(Wales) Mark Williams	1–9	
Runner-up	7.	2018	Snooker Shoot Out	(Cyprus) Michael Georgiou	0–1	
Runner-up	8.	2020	World Grand Prix	(Australia) Neil Robertson	8–10	

=== Minor-ranking finals: 2 ===
Outcome	No.	Year	Championship	Opponent in the final	Score	Ref.
Runner-up	1.	2011	Sheffield Open	(England) Ben Woollaston	2–4	
Runner-up	2.	2013	FFB Open	(England) Mark Selby	3–4	

=== Non-ranking finals: 5 (1 title) ===
Outcome	No.	Year	Championship	Opponent in the final	Score
Winner	1.	2008	World Series of Snooker Berlin	(England) Shaun Murphy	6–1
Runner-up	1	2009	World Series of Snooker Prague	(England) Jimmy White	3–5
Runner-up	2.	2011	Brazil Masters	(England) Shaun Murphy	0–5
Runner-up	3.	2012	Snooker Shoot Out	(England) Barry Hawkins	0–1
Runner-up	4.	2020	Championship League (March)	(Scotland) Scott Donaldson	0–3

=== Pro-am finals: 9 (4 titles) ===
Outcome	No.	Year	Championship	Opponent in the final	Score	Ref.
Runner-up	1.	1994	Pontins Spring Open	(England) Wayne Brown	3–7	
Winner	1.	1995	Pontins Autumn Open	(England) Stephen Lee	5–1	
Runner-up	2.	1996	Marseille International Open	(England) Matthew Couch	4–5	
Winner	2.	1997	Austrian Open	(England) Matthew Couch	7–6	
Runner-up	3.	2008	Belgian Open	(England) Ricky Walden	0–4	
Runner-up	4.	2016	PMK Invitational Pro-Am	(Scotland) Anthony McGill	2–4	
Winner	3.	2017	PMK Invitational Pro-Am	(Scotland) Eden Sharav	4–3	
Winner	4.	2018	PMK Invitational Pro-Am (2)	(Northern Ireland) Joe Swail	4–0	
Runner-up	5.	2019	PMK Invitational Pro-Am (2)	(Scotland) Michael Collumb	3–4	

=== Team finals: 1 (1 title) ===
Outcome	No.	Year	Championship	Team	Opponent in the final	Score
Winner	1.	2017	CVB Snooker Challenge	Great Britain	China	26–9

=== Amateur finals: 1 (1 title) ===
Outcome	No.	Year	Championship	Opponent in the final	Score	Ref.
Winner	1.	1993	Scottish Amateur Championship	(Scotland) Neil Martin	8–4	

== Sources ==
- Rookwood, Dan (14 February 2003). "Small talk: Graeme Dott". The Guardian. London.
