= 2005–06 snooker world rankings =

No. 1: Ronnie O'Sullivan
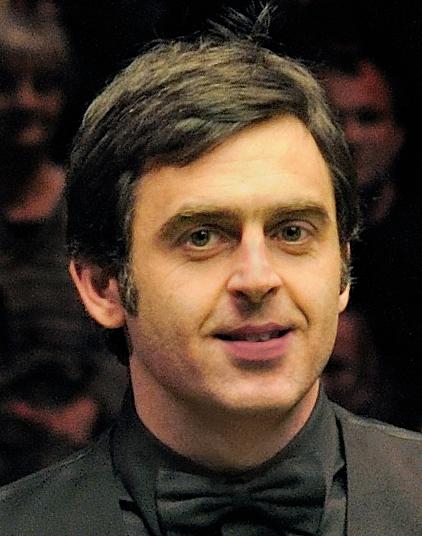

Personal information
- Born: December 5, 1975 (age 50)

Sport
- Country: England
- Sport: Snooker
- Professional: 1992–present
- Highest ranking: 1

Preceded by 2004–05	2005–06	Succeeded by 2006–07

2005–06 snooker world rankings: The professional world rankings for the top 64 snooker players in the 2005‍–‍06 season are listed below.

No. 2: Stephen Hendry
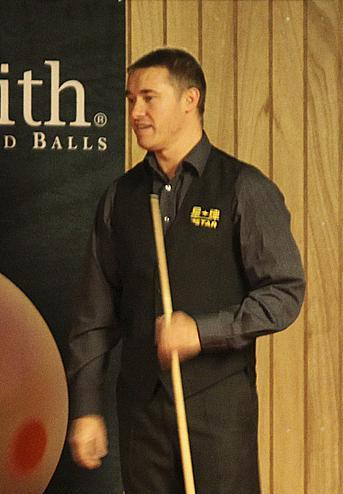

Personal information
- Born: January 13, 1969 (age 57)

Sport
- Country: Scotland
- Sport: Snooker
- Professional: 1985–2012, 2020–2024
- Highest ranking: 1

No. 3: Stephen Maguire
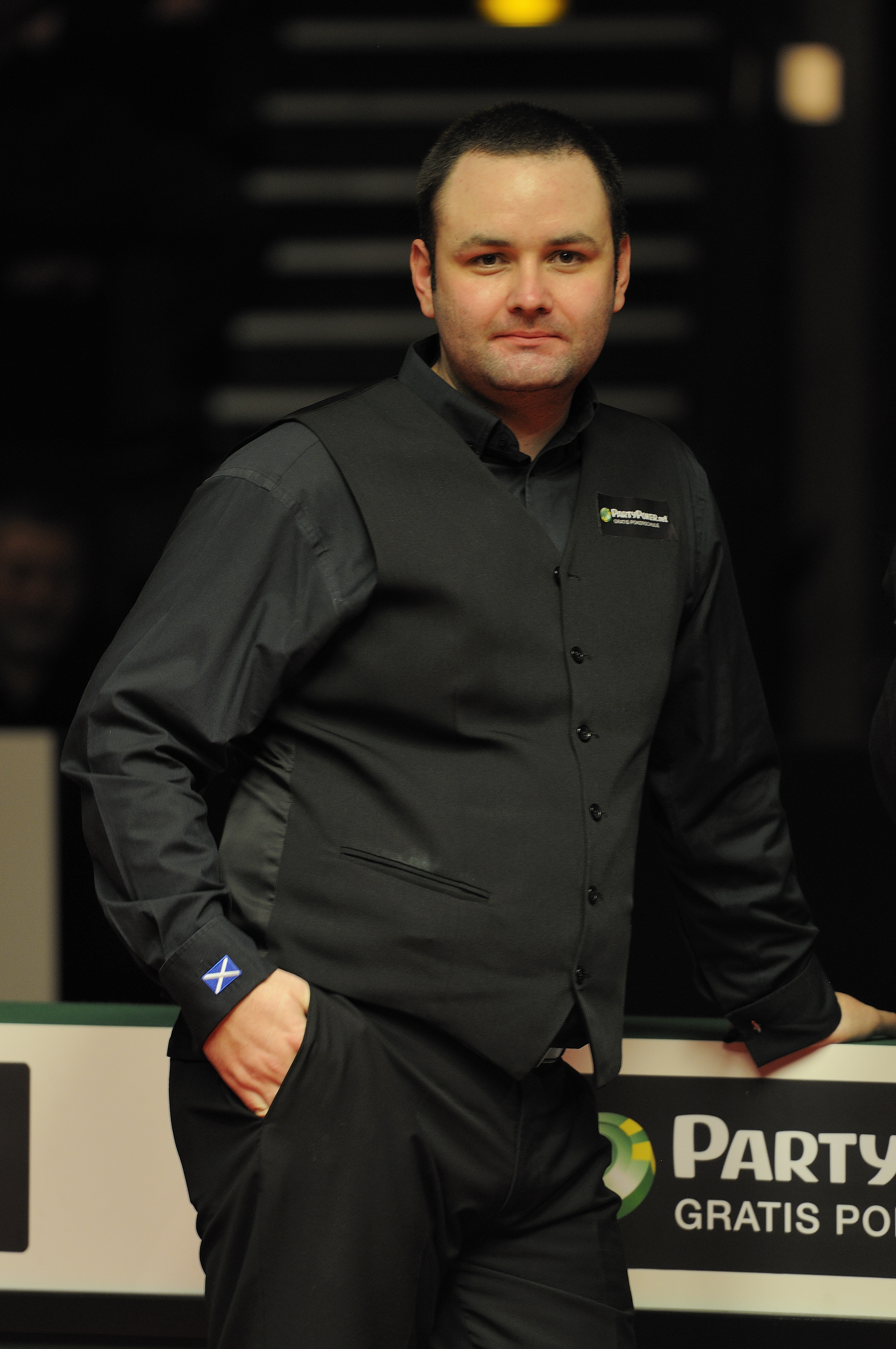

Personal information
- Born: March 13, 1981 (age 45)

Sport
- Country: Scotland
- Sport: Snooker
- Professional: 1998–present
- Highest ranking: 2

No.	Name	Nationality	Points
1	Ronnie O'Sullivan	England	49812
2	Stephen Hendry	Scotland	42137
3	Stephen Maguire	Scotland	33750
4	Matthew Stevens	Wales	33712
5	Paul Hunter	England	32125
6	John Higgins	Scotland	32024
7	Peter Ebdon	England	31175
8	Jimmy White	England	30962
9	Mark Williams	Wales	29749
10	Stephen Lee	England	29650
11	Ken Doherty	Ireland	29124
12	Alan McManus	Scotland	28800
13	Graeme Dott	Scotland	28315
14	Joe Perry	England	27150
15	Steve Davis	England	26987
16	Ian McCulloch	England	26612
17	Anthony Hamilton	England	26549
18	Barry Pinches	England	26375
19	Ali Carter	England	25500
20	Mark King	England	25400
21	Shaun Murphy^{[a]}	England	25112
22	Quinten Hann^{[b]}	Australia	24950
23	David Gray	England	24950
24	Michael Holt	England	24712
25	Marco Fu	Hong Kong	22724
26	Robert Milkins	England	22687
27	Nigel Bond	England	22500
28	Neil Robertson	Australia	22275
29	John Parrott	England	22150
30	Barry Hawkins	England	21950
31	Andy Hicks	England	21800
32	James Wattana	Thailand	21800
33	Ryan Day	Wales	21725
34	Dominic Dale	Wales	20775
35	Drew Henry	Scotland	19762
36	Tony Drago	Malta	19762
37	Stuart Bingham	England	19650
38	Gerard Greene	Northern Ireland	19562
39	Mark Selby	England	19537
40	Joe Swail	Northern Ireland	18874
41	Chris Small	Scotland	18712
42	Mark Davis	England	18700
43	Michael Judge	Ireland	18050
44	Fergal O'Brien	Ireland	16750
45	Dave Harold	England	16725
46	Adrian Gunnell	England	16575
47	Stuart Pettman	England	16100
48	Ricky Walden	England	15500
49	Rory McLeod	England	15500
50	Patrick Wallace	Northern Ireland	17762
51	Tom Ford	England	15175
52	Marcus Campbell	Scotland	15175
53	Mike Dunn	England	15037
54	Shokat Ali	Pakistan	14837
55	Robin Hull	Finland	14737
56	Jamie Burnett	Scotland	14550
57	Jimmy Michie	England	13912
58	Lee Walker	Wales	13487
59	Brian Morgan	England	13450
60	Rod Lawler	England	13412
61	David Roe	England	13324
62	Ding Junhui	China	13225
63	Simon Bedford	England	12550
64	Joe Jogia	England	12550

== Notes ==
- ^{a} As the 2005 World Champion, Shaun Murphy automatically qualified for every ranking tournament and the Masters.
- ^{b} Quinten Hann did not play due to an unspecified illness before being banned for eight years for a match-fixing attempt.
