= World Series of Snooker =

Tournament information
- Venue: Various
- Country: Various
- Established: 1987
- Organisation(s): WPBSA (1987–1993); FSTC Sports Management (2007–2010)
- Format: Non-ranking events
- Final year: 2009/2010
- Final champion: (England) Shaun Murphy

The Sportingbet.com World Series of Snooker was a series of invitational snooker tournaments set up as a complement to the WPBSA's tour Its first season was played in 2008/2009, consisting of four two-day tournaments in St. Helier, Berlin, Moscow and Warsaw and the three-day Grand Final in Portimão.

It featured ten leading players – each tournament featured four of these taking on four wild cards. Points were awarded for reaching at least the semi-finals. The winner of each tournament received five points, the runner-up three and losing semi-finalists one each. These points determined seeding positions for the Grand Final.

There was a previous incarnation of the event organised by Matchroom Sport, that ran in the 1987/88 season, and from 1990/91 until 1992/93.

== Management and purpose ==
The tour was set up by FSTC Sports Management, who managed leading snooker players John Higgins and Graeme Dott, as well as Eurosport (who screened the events alongside the coverage of the WPBSA tour), Higgins, and leading referee Michaela Tabb. Higgins felt that the game's attendances were too low, and that potential new venues outside the game's traditional United Kingdom and recently developed Far East markets were not being utilised, and wanted to give something back to the sport. After conducting exploratory tours a trial event was staged in 2007 in Warsaw. The event was called the 2007 Warsaw Snooker Tour. This paved the way and the World Series started in the 2008/2009 season.. The World Series lasted for two seasons.

== Results ==
=== 1987/1988 ===
Date	Name	Venue	Winner	Runner-up	Score	Ref.
1987	Hong Kong Masters	Hong Kong	(England) Steve Davis	(Scotland) Stephen Hendry	9–3	
1987	Tokyo Masters	(Japan) Tokyo	(Northern Ireland) Dennis Taylor	(Wales) Terry Griffiths	6–3	
1987	Canadian Masters	(Canada) Toronto	(Northern Ireland) Dennis Taylor	(England) Jimmy White	9–7	

=== 1990/1991 ===
Date	Name	Venue	Winner	Runner-up	Score	Ref.
1990	World Series Challenge	Hong Kong	(Thailand) James Wattana	(England) Jimmy White	9–3	
1990	Scottish Masters	(Scotland) Motherwell	(Scotland) Stephen Hendry	(Wales) Terry Griffiths	10–6	
1990	Humo Masters	(Belgium) Antwerp	(England) John Parrott	(England) Jimmy White	9–6	

=== 1991/1992 ===
Date	Name	Venue	Winner	Runner-up	Score	Ref.
1991	Thailand Masters	(Thailand) Bangkok	(England) Steve Davis	(Scotland) Stephen Hendry	6–3	
1991	Hong Kong Challenge	Hong Kong	(Scotland) Stephen Hendry	(Thailand) James Wattana	9–1	
1991	Indian Challenge	(India) Delhi	(Scotland) Stephen Hendry	(England) John Parrott	9–5	
1991	Scottish Masters	(Scotland) Motherwell	(England) Mike Hallett	(England) Steve Davis	10–6	
1991	Humo Masters	(Belgium) Antwerp	(England) Mike Hallett	(England) Neal Foulds	9–7	
1991	Belgian Challenge	(Belgium) Antwerp	(England) Steve Davis	(Scotland) Stephen Hendry	10–9	

=== 1992/1993 ===
Date	Name	Venue	Winner	Runner-up	Score	Ref.
1992	Kent Classic	(China) Beijing	(England) John Parrott	(Scotland) Stephen Hendry	6–5	
1992	Scottish Masters	(Scotland) Motherwell	(England) Neal Foulds	(England) Gary Wilkinson	10–8	
1992	Humo Masters	(Belgium) Antwerp	(Thailand) James Wattana	(England) John Parrott	10–5	
1992	World Matchplay	(England) Doncaster	(Thailand) James Wattana	(England) Steve Davis	9–4	

=== 2007/2008 ===
Date	Name	Venue	Winner	Runner-up	Score
16–17 June 2007	Warsaw Snooker Tour	(Poland) Warsaw	(England) Mark Selby	(Scotland) John Higgins	5–3

=== 2008/2009 ===
Date	Name	Venue	Winner	Runner-up	Score
21–22 June 2008	World Series of Snooker – Jersey	St. Helier	(Scotland) John Higgins	(England) Mark Selby	6–3
12–13 July 2008	World Series of Snooker – Berlin	Berlin	(Scotland) Graeme Dott	(England) Shaun Murphy	6–1
25–26 October 2008	World Series of Snooker – Warsaw	Warsaw	(China) Ding Junhui	(Republic of Ireland) Ken Doherty	6–4
22–23 November 2008	World Series of Snooker – Moscow	Moscow	(Scotland) John Higgins	(China) Ding Junhui	5–0
8–10 May 2009	World Series of Snooker Grand Final	Portimão	(England) Shaun Murphy	(Scotland) John Higgins	6–2

=== 2009/2010 ===
Date	Name	Venue	Winner	Runner-up	Score
16–17 May 2009	World Series of Snooker – Killarney	Killarney	(England) Shaun Murphy	(England) Jimmy White	5–1
17–18 October 2009	World Series of Snooker – Prague	Prague	(England) Jimmy White	(Scotland) Graeme Dott	5–3
