= Anna Mazhirina =

Russian pool, snooker and billiards player, born 1983

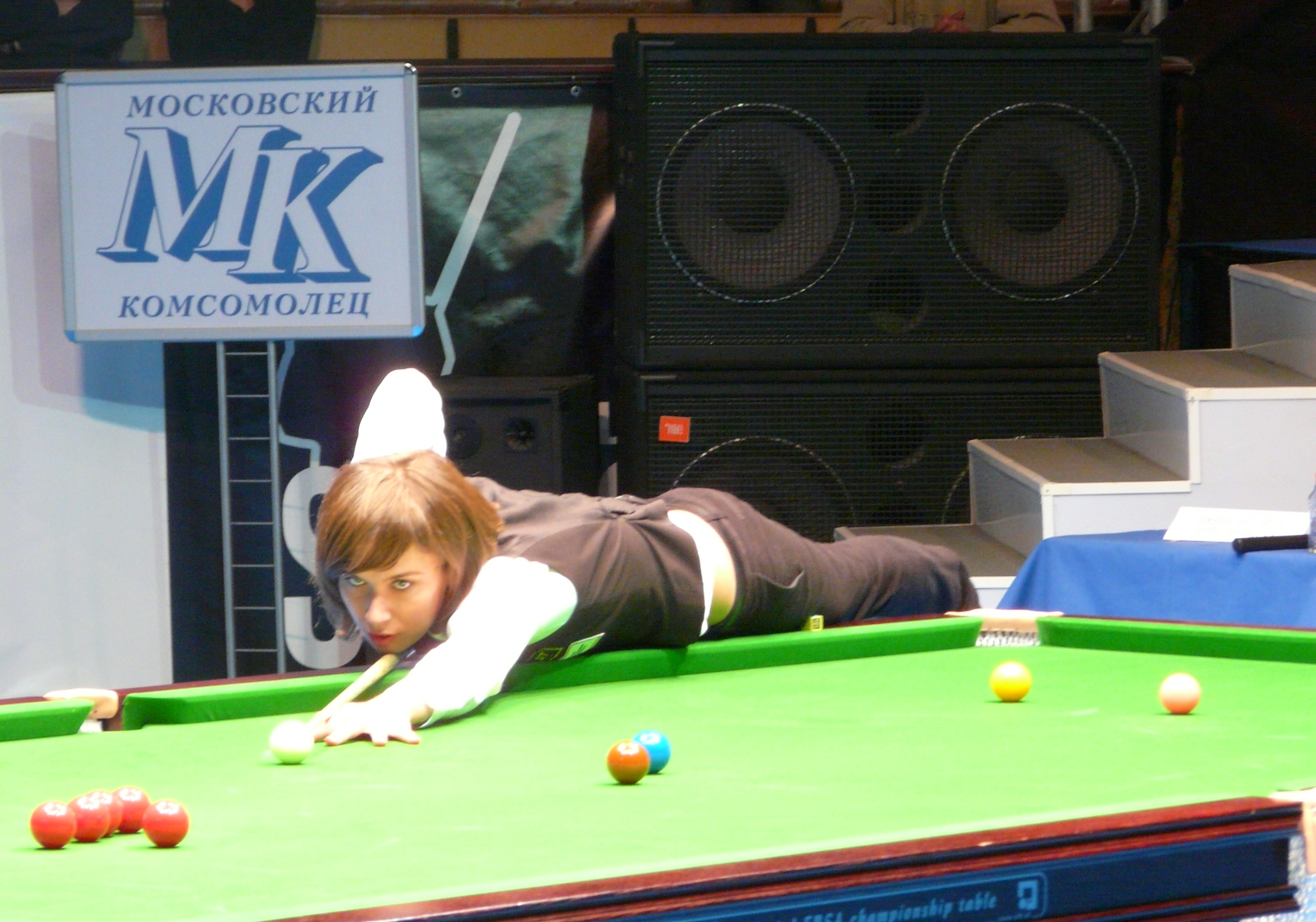
- Anna Mazhirina at the World Series of Snooker tournament (2008)

Personal information
- Born: 28 March 1983 (age 43) Moscow, Russia

Pool career
- Country: Russia (formerly); Cyprus (currently)
- Pool games: Straight pool, snooker, billiards

Tournament wins
- World Champion: Russian Billiards (2005, 2006)
- Highest rank: Euro Tour - 1

Anna Mazhirina (born 28 March 1983) is a Russian born professional pool, and amateur snooker and billiards player. She has become a Cyprus resident, and now represents Cyprus in international events.

Mazhirina is a former Russian Billiards world champion, winning the event in 2005 and 2006. In addition, she is a multiple time finalist at European championships in Billiards, Snooker and pool. She won the European championships in Billiards in 2004, 2005.

== Career ==
Mazhirina is twice a runner-up at the EBSA European Snooker Championship, losing in the singles in 2009, and in the team event in 2011. Mazhirina also reached the final of the European Pool Championships in 2012 in the straight pool event.

Mazhirina is a two-time winner of events on the Euro Tour, winning the 2013 Austria Open and Ardennen Cup. Mazhirina would reach Euro Tour number one after her second win in 2013.

== Achievements ==
Russian Billiards

Outcome	No.	Year	Championship	Opponent	Score	Ref.
Runner-up	1	2004	European Championship			
Runner-up	2	2005	European Championship			
Runner-up	3	2005	World Championship			
Runner-up	4	2006	World Championship			

Euro Tour (Pool)

Outcome	No.	Year	Championship	Opponent	Score	Ref.
Winner	1	2013	Austria Open	Jasmin Ouschan	7-4	
Winner	2	2013	Ardennen Cup			

Snooker

Outcome	No.	Year	Championship	Opponent	Score	Ref.
Runner-up	1	2009	European Championship Women's Individual Final	Wendy Jans	0–5	
Runner-up	2	2011	European Championship Women's Team Final (Russia)	Germany	2–5	
