= 2010–11 snooker season =

Series of snooker tournaments

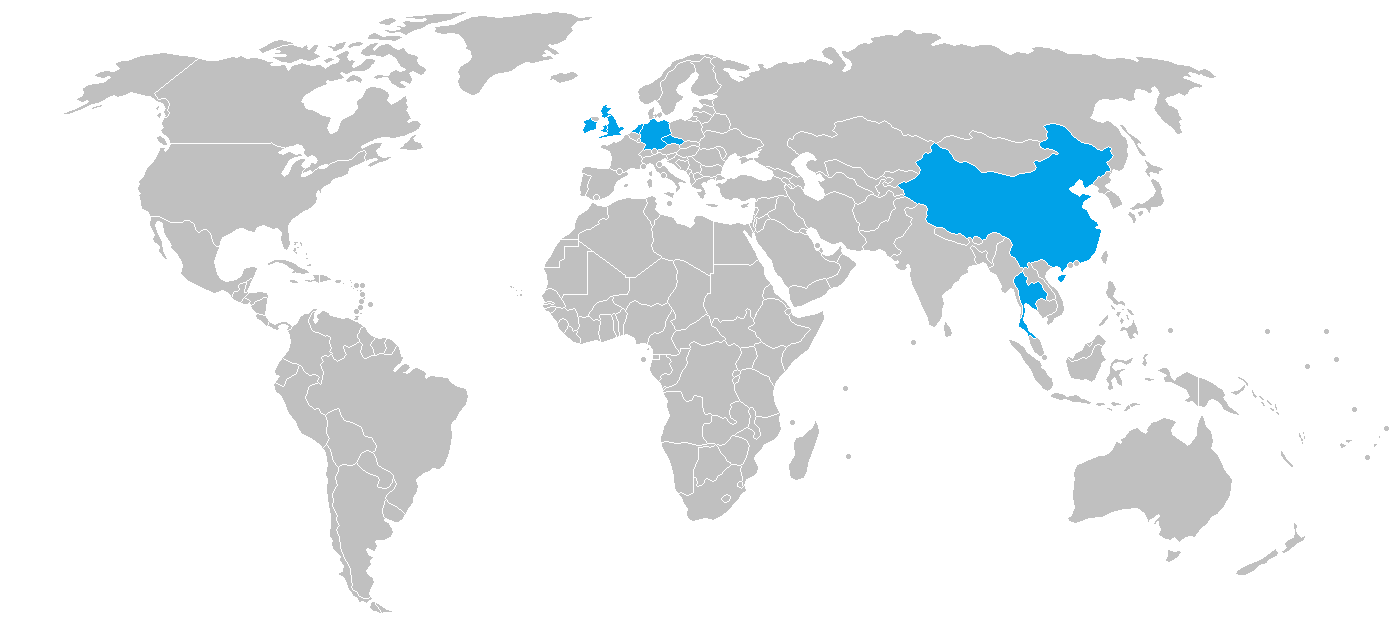
- Nations that hosted an event in the snooker calendar during the 2010–11 season

Details
- Duration: 20 May 2010 – 2 May 2011
- Tournaments: 39 (8 ranking events)

Triple Crown winners
- UK Championship: (Scotland) John Higgins
- Masters: (China) Ding Junhui
- World Championship: (Scotland) John Higgins

The 2010–11 snooker season was a series of snooker tournaments played between 20 May 2010 and 2 May 2011. The German Masters was the first ranking tournament in Germany since the 1997/1998 season. The Grand Prix was renamed to World Open, and the format of the tournament was changed with 32 amateurs joining the Main Tour professionals. The Players Tour Championship minor-ranking series was introduced to the calendar. These events were open to amateurs and professionals with a separate Order of Merit. The top 24 in the Order of Merit qualified for the Finals, which was a ranking event. The Premier League was for the first time part of the Main Tour. The Jiangsu Classic was renamed to the Wuxi Classic, and other events were introduced to the calendar: the new cue sport Power Snooker, the World Seniors Championship, and Snooker Shoot Out. The Scottish Professional Championship was held for the first time since 1989.

At the end of the season John Higgins was named the World Snooker Player of the Year and the Snooker Writers Player of the Year, Judd Trump the Fans Player of the Year, Mark Williams the Players Player of the Year and Jack Lisowski the Rookie of the Year. Judd Trump received the "Performance of the Year" for winning his first ranking event, the China Open and reaching the final of the World Championship. "The Magic Moment" award has gone to Rory McLeod for his "thrilling" win against Tony Drago at the Snooker Shoot-Out. Joe Davis, Fred Davis, John Pulman, Ray Reardon, John Spencer, Alex Higgins, Steve Davis and Stephen Hendry were inducted into the Hall of Fame.

== New professional players ==
Countries

- Brazil
- China
- England
- Germany
- Northern Ireland
- Norway
- Scotland
- Thailand
- Wales

Note: new means in these case, that these players were not on the 2009/2010 professional Main Tour.

International champions:

1. IBSF World Snooker Championship winner: (England) Alfie Burden
2. IBSF World Under-21 Snooker Championship winner: (Thailand) Noppon Saengkham
3. EBSA European Under-19 Snooker Championships winner: (Wales) Jak Jones
4. EBSA International Play Off winner: (Norway) Kurt Maflin
5. ACBS Asian Snooker Championship winner: (Thailand) Issara Kachaiwong
6. ACBS Asian Under-21 Snooker Championship winner: (China) Liu Chuang

NGB nominations

7. English nomination 1: (Note: Adam Wicheard qualified by topping the Pro Ticket Tour rankings.) (England) Adam Wicheard
8. English nomination 2: (Note: Kuldesh Johal qualified by winning the Pro Ticket Tour Play Offs.) (England) Kuldesh Johal
9. Welsh nomination: (Note: Andrew Pagett qualified by topping the Welsh rankings.) (Wales) Andrew Pagett
10. Scottish nomination: (Scotland) James McBain
11. Northern Irish nomination: (Note: Dermot McGlinchey qualified by topping the Northern Irish rankings.) (Northern Ireland) Dermot McGlinchey
12. ACBS Asian Nomination: (Thailand) Thanawat Thirapongpaiboon

From PIOS Tour

13. (England) Jack Lisowski
14. (England) Liam Highfield
15. (England) Paul Davison
16. (Scotland) Anthony McGill
17. (England) Kyren Wilson
18. (England) Jamie O'Neill
19. (England) Justin Astley
20. (Wales) Jamie Jones

WPBSA Wildcard

21. (England) Reanne Evans
22. (Germany) Patrick Einsle
23. (Brazil) Igor Figueiredo

== Calendar ==
The following table outlines the results and dates for all the ranking and major invitational events.

=== World Snooker Tour ===
Start	Finish	Tournament	Venue	Winner	Score	Runner-up	Ref.
3 Jun	6 Jun	Wuxi Classic†	Wuxi City Sports Park Stadium in Wuxi, China	Shaun Murphy (ENG)	9–8	Ding Junhui (CHN)	
24 Jun	27 Jun	Players Tour Championship – Event 1‡	World Snooker Academy in Sheffield, England	Mark Williams (WAL)	4–0	Stephen Maguire (SCO)	
8 Jul	11 Jul	Players Tour Championship – Event 2‡	World Snooker Academy in Sheffield, England	Mark Selby (ENG)	4–3	Barry Pinches (ENG)	
18 Jul	25 Jul	Six-red World Championship†	Montien Riverside Hotel in Bangkok, Thailand	Mark Selby (ENG)	8–6	Ricky Walden (ENG)	
6 Aug	8 Aug	Players Tour Championship – Event 3‡	World Snooker Academy in Sheffield, England	Tom Ford (ENG)	4–0	Jack Lisowski (ENG)	
14 Aug	16 Aug	Players Tour Championship – Event 4‡	World Snooker Academy in Sheffield, England	Barry Pinches (ENG)	4–3	Ronnie O'Sullivan (ENG)	
26 Aug	29 Aug	Euro Players Tour Championship – Event 1‡ (Note: Event also known as the 2010 Paul Hunter Classic)	Stadthalle in Fürth, Germany	Judd Trump (ENG)	4–3	Anthony Hamilton (ENG)	
6 Sep	12 Sep	Shanghai Masters	Shanghai Grand Stage in Shanghai, China	Ali Carter (ENG)	10–7	Jamie Burnett (SCO)	
18 Sep	26 Sep	World Open	S.E.C.C. in Glasgow, Scotland	Neil Robertson (AUS)	5–1	Ronnie O'Sullivan (ENG)	
30 Sep	3 Oct	Euro Players Tour Championship – Event 2‡ (Note: Event also known as the 2010 Brugge Open)	Boudewijn Seapark in Bruges, Belgium	Shaun Murphy (ENG)	4–2	Matthew Couch (ENG)	
7 Oct	10 Oct	Players Tour Championship – Event 5‡	World Snooker Academy in Sheffield, England	Ding Junhui (CHN)	4–1	Jamie Jones (WAL)	
14 Oct	17 Oct	Players Tour Championship – Event 6‡	World Snooker Academy in Sheffield, England	Dominic Dale (WAL)	4–3	Martin Gould (ENG)	
22 Oct	24 Oct	Euro Players Tour Championship – Event 3‡ (Note: Event also known as the 2010 Rhein-Main Masters and the 2010 Rüsselsheim Cup)	Walter Kobel Sporthalle in Rüsselsheim, Germany	Marcus Campbell (SCO)	4–0	Liang Wenbo (CHN)	
28 Oct	31 Oct	Euro Players Tour Championship – Event 4‡ (Note: Event also known as the 2010 MIUS Cup)	South West Snooker Academy in Gloucester, England	Stephen Lee (ENG)	4–2	Stephen Maguire (SCO)	
12 Nov	14 Nov	Euro Players Tour Championship – Event 5‡ (Note: Event also known as the 2010 Ruhr Championship)	Sparkassen Arena in Hamm, Germany	John Higgins (SCO)	4–2	Shaun Murphy (ENG)	
19 Nov	21 Nov	Euro Players Tour Championship – Event 6‡ (Note: Event also known as the 2010 Prague Classic)	Aréna Sparta Podvinný Mlýn in Prague, Czech Republic	Michael Holt (ENG)	4–3	John Higgins (SCO)	
8 Sep	28 Nov	Premier League†	Potters Leisure Resort in Hopton-on-Sea, England	Ronnie O'Sullivan (ENG)	7–1	Shaun Murphy (ENG)	
4 Dec	12 Dec	UK Championship	Telford International Centre in Telford, England	John Higgins (SCO)	10–9	Mark Williams (WAL)	
9 Jan	16 Jan	Masters†	Wembley Arena in London, England	Ding Junhui (CHN)	10–4	Marco Fu (HKG)	
28 Jan	30 Jan	Snooker Shoot Out†	Circus Arena in Blackpool, England	Nigel Bond (ENG)	1–0	Robert Milkins (ENG)	
2 Feb	6 Feb	German Masters	Tempodrom in Berlin, Germany	Mark Williams (WAL)	9–7	Mark Selby (ENG)	
14 Feb	20 Feb	Welsh Open	Newport Centre in Newport, Wales	John Higgins (SCO)	9–6	Stephen Maguire (SCO)	
17 Mar	20 Mar	Players Tour Championship Finals	The Helix in Dublin, Ireland	Shaun Murphy (ENG)	4–0	Martin Gould (ENG)	
3 Jan	24 Mar	Championship League†	Crondon Park Golf Club in Stock, England	Matthew Stevens (WAL)	3–1	Shaun Murphy (ENG)	
28 Mar	3 Apr	China Open	Beijing University Students' Gymnasium in Beijing, China	Judd Trump (ENG)	10–8	Mark Selby (ENG)	
16 Apr	2 May	World Snooker Championship	Crucible Theatre in Sheffield, England	John Higgins (SCO)	18–15	Judd Trump (ENG)	

Ranking event
‡ Minor-ranking event
† Non-ranking event

=== World Ladies Billiards and Snooker Association ===
Start	Finish	Tournament	Venue	Winner	Score	Runner-up	Ref.
25 Sep		Wytech Masters	North East Derbyshire Snooker Centre in Chesterfield, England	Reanne Evans (ENG)	3–1	Maria Catalano (ENG)	
26 Sep		UK Ladies Championship	North East Derbyshire Snooker Centre in Chesterfield, England	Reanne Evans (ENG)	3–0	Maria Catalano (ENG)	
30 Oct		East Anglian Championship	Cambridge Snooker Centre in Cambridge, England	Reanne Evans (ENG)	3–0	Maria Catalano (ENG)	
27 Nov		British Open	Pot Black Sports Bar in Bury St Edmunds, England	Reanne Evans (ENG)	3–1	Emma Bonney (ENG)	
12 Feb		Southern Classic	Jesters Snooker in Swindon, England	Reanne Evans (ENG)	3–0	Maria Catalano (ENG)	
12 Mar		Connie Gough Memorial	Fareham Snooker Club in Fareham, England	Reanne Evans (ENG)	3–0	Emma Bonney (ENG)	
8 Apr	13 Apr	World Ladies Championship	Pot Black Sports Bar in Bury St Edmunds, England	Reanne Evans (ENG)	5–1	Emma Bonney (ENG)	

=== Seniors events ===
Start	Finish	Tournament	Venue	Winner	Score	Runner-up	Ref.
5 Nov	7 Nov	World Seniors Championship	Cedar Court Hotel in Bradford, England	Jimmy White (ENG)	4–1	Steve Davis (ENG)	

=== Other events ===
Start	Finish	Tournament	Venue	Winner	Score	Runner-up	Ref.
20 May	24 May	Austrian Open	BRP-Rotax-Halle in Wels, Austria	Judd Trump (ENG)	6–4	Neil Robertson (AUS)	
17 Jun	20 Jun	Pink Ribbon	South West Snooker Academy in Gloucester, England	Michael Holt (ENG)	6–5	Jimmy White (ENG)	
16 Jul	18 Jul	Chinese Classic	Beijing University Students Gymnasium in Beijing, China	Tian Pengfei (CHN)	5–3	Zhang Anda (CHN)	
19 Jul	25 Jul	Beijing International Challenge	Beijing University Students Gymnasium in Beijing, China	Tian Pengfei (CHN)	9–3	Ryan Day (WAL)	
23 Jul	25 Jul	Vienna Snooker Open	Theater Dschungel in Vienna, Austria	Stephen Lee (ENG)	5–4	Bjorn Haneveer (BEL)	
24 Jul	25 Jul	Irish Classic	Celbridge Snooker Club in Kildare, Ireland	Fergal O'Brien (IRL)	5–1	Michael Judge (IRL)	
11 Oct	20 Oct	Paul Hunter English Open	Northern Snooker Centre in Leeds, England	Robbie Williams (ENG)	6–4	Stephen Craigie (ENG)	
18 Oct	20 Oct	Asian Games	Asian Games Town Gymnasium in Guangzhou, China	Marco Fu (HKG)	4–2	Ding Junhui (CHN)	
30 Oct		Power Snooker	indigO2 in London, England	Ronnie O'Sullivan (ENG)	(Note: This format was based on points. O'Sullivan won 572–258.)	Ding Junhui (CHN)	
10 Mar	13 Mar	Hainan Classic	Boao Conference Center in Boao, China	John Higgins (SCO)	7–2	Jamie Cope (ENG)	
11 Apr	14 Apr	Scottish Professional Championship	Lucky Break Snooker Club in Clydebank, Scotland	John Higgins (SCO)	6–1	Anthony McGill (SCO)	

== Official rankings ==
=== Seeding revision 1 ===
No.	Ch.	Name	Points
1	Steady	(Scotland) John Higgins	57820
2	▲	(Australia) Neil Robertson	48405
3	▼	(England) Ronnie O'Sullivan	47835
4	▲	(England) Ali Carter	46620
5	▲	(China) Ding Junhui	40975
6	▼	(Scotland) Stephen Maguire	40495
7	▼	(England) Shaun Murphy	38655
8	▲	(Wales) Mark Williams	37699
9	▼	(England) Mark Selby	35445
10	▲	(Northern Ireland) Mark Allen	35380
11	▼	(Scotland) Stephen Hendry	33785
12	▼	(Wales) Ryan Day	33410
13	▲	(Scotland) Graeme Dott	30890
14	▼	(Hong Kong) Marco Fu	29635
15	▲	(England) Mark King	29085
16	▲	(China) Liang Wenbo	28065

=== Seeding revision 2 ===
No.	Ch.	Name	Points
1	▲	(Australia) Neil Robertson	54190
2	▲	(England) Ali Carter	48600
3	▼	(Scotland) John Higgins	46470
4	▲	(Wales) Mark Williams	45000
5	▲	(Scotland) Stephen Maguire	44160
6	▼	(England) Ronnie O'Sullivan	43910
7	Steady	(England) Shaun Murphy	43845
8	▼	(China) Ding Junhui	43370
9	Steady	(England) Mark Selby	38775
10	▲	(Scotland) Stephen Hendry	34570
11	▲	(Scotland) Graeme Dott	34000
12	▼	(Northern Ireland) Mark Allen	33935
13	▲	(England) Peter Ebdon	33110
14	▲	(England) Jamie Cope	32178
15	Steady	(England) Mark King	31755
16	▼	(Hong Kong) Marco Fu	31480

=== Seeding revision 3 ===
No.	Ch.	Name	Points
1	▲	(Scotland) John Higgins	54320
2	▼	(Australia) Neil Robertson	52940
3	▲	(Wales) Mark Williams	48755
4	▲	(China) Ding Junhui	46480
5	▲	(England) Shaun Murphy	46085
6	▲	(England) Mark Selby	45645
7	▼	(England) Ali Carter	45340
8	▼	(Scotland) Stephen Maguire	43780
9	▼	(England) Ronnie O'Sullivan	41480
10	▲	(Scotland) Graeme Dott	37450
11	▲	(Northern Ireland) Mark Allen	36525
12	▲	(England) Peter Ebdon	34880
13	▲	(England) Jamie Cope	33975
14	▼	(Scotland) Stephen Hendry	33360
15	▲	(England) Ricky Walden	31500
16	▼	(England) Mark King	30605

=== Seeding revision 4 ===
No.	Ch.	Name	Points
1	Steady	(Scotland) John Higgins	59320
2	▲	(Wales) Mark Williams	55680
3	▼	(Australia) Neil Robertson	52340
4	▲	(England) Mark Selby	50345
5	▼	(China) Ding Junhui	49580
6	▲	(Scotland) Stephen Maguire	47780
7	▼	(England) Shaun Murphy	46185
8	▼	(England) Ali Carter	45440
9	▲	(Scotland) Graeme Dott	41250
10	▼	(England) Ronnie O'Sullivan	40980
11	Steady	(Northern Ireland) Mark Allen	38425
12	Steady	(England) Peter Ebdon	37980
13	▲	(Scotland) Stephen Hendry	36460
14	▼	(England) Jamie Cope	36000
15	Steady	(England) Ricky Walden	32950
16	▲	(Hong Kong) Marco Fu	32400

== World ranking points ==
No.	Ch	Player	Season		Tournaments								Season	Cut-off points (Note: See for the rankings at the first seedings cut-off point; see for the second, see for the third.)			Total
No.	Ch	Player	08/09 (Note: The 2008/2009 points only include the points from that season that counted towards the last ranking update.)	09/10	PTC	SM	WOO	UK	GM	WEO	CO	WC	10/11	1	2	3	Total
1	▲7	(Wales) Mark Williams	0	23480	8460	2660	4480	6400	5000	2500	980	6400	36880	45000	48755	55680	60360
2	▼1	(Scotland) John Higgins (Note: John Higgins was banned from all WSA tournaments from 2 May 2010 until 2 November 2010.)	0	26820	3600			8000	1900	5000	3500	10000	32000	46470	54320	59320	58820
3	▲6	(England) Mark Selby	0	17520	12320	4480	805	3040	4000	3200	5600	5000	38445	38775	45645	50345	55965
4	▲1	(China) Ding Junhui	0	27200	3680	2660	3500	3040	2500	2500	4480	6400	28760	43370	46480	49580	55960
5	▼3	(Australia) Neil Robertson	0	25580	3880	980	7000	4000	700	1900	2660	1400	22520	54190	52940	52340	48100
6	▼2	(England) Ali Carter	0	22520	2040	7000	1960	1120	1900	3200	3500	3800	24520	48600	45340	45440	47040
7	Steady	(England) Shaun Murphy	0	15180	12320	2660	805	5120	1900	700	4480	3800	31785	43845	46085	46185	46965
8	▼2	(Scotland) Stephen Maguire	0	18420	7840	2660	3500	4000	2500	4000	980	1400	26880	44160	43780	47780	45300
9	▲18	(England) Judd Trump	0	8360	9420	1960	1960	3040	1400	575	7000	8000	33355	25330	27750	29275	41715
10	▲3	(Scotland) Graeme Dott	0	16865	5040	3500	805	3040	3200	2500	980	5000	24065	34000	37450	41250	40930
11	▼8	(England) Ronnie O'Sullivan	0	23960	2600	0	5600	1120	700	700	980	5000	16700	43910	41480	40980	40660
12	▼2	(Northern Ireland) Mark Allen	0	17580	4240	980	805	5120	700	1900	980	5000	19725	33935	36525	38425	37305
13	▲5	(England) Peter Ebdon	0	13120	6400	2660	4480	1120	1900	1900	3500	1400	23360	33110	34880	37980	36480
14	▲11	(Wales) Matthew Stevens	0	10715	9320	3500	1960	2240	1400	2500	1960	2800	25680	29750	28940	31440	36395
15	▲2	(England) Jamie Cope	0	14220	5720	4480	2660	1120	700	1900	980	3800	21360	32178	33975	36000	35580
16	▼5	(Scotland) Stephen Hendry	0	17560	920	980	2660	3040	1900	1900	2660	3800	17860	34570	33360	36460	35420

Player did not enter tournament.

== Points distribution ==
2010/2011 Points distribution for world ranking and minor-ranking events

Tournament	Round →	R128	R96	R80	R64	R48	R32	R24	R16	QF	SF	F	W
Shanghai Masters	Unseeded loser	–	560	910	1260	1610	1960	–	2660	3500	4480	5600	7000
Shanghai Masters	Seeded loser	–	280	455	630	805	980	–	–	–	–	–	–
World Open	Unseeded loser	910	1260	–	1610	–	1960	–	2660	3500	4480	5600	7000
World Open	Seeded loser	455	630	–	805	–	–	–	–	–	–	–	–
UK Championship	Unseeded loser	–	640	1040	1440	1840	2240	–	3040	4000	5120	6400	8000
UK Championship	Seeded loser	–	320	520	720	920	1120	–	–	–	–	–	–
German Masters	Unseeded loser	–	650	–	900	1150	1400	–	1900	2500	3200	4000	5000
German Masters	Seeded loser	–	325	–	450	575	700	–	–	–	–	–	–
Welsh Open	Unseeded loser	–	400	650	900	1150	1400	–	1900	2500	3200	4000	5000
Welsh Open	Seeded loser	–	200	325	450	575	700	–	–	–	–	–	–
China Open	Unseeded loser	–	560	910	1260	1610	1960	–	2660	3500	4480	5600	7000
China Open	Seeded loser	–	280	455	630	805	980	–	–	–	–	–	–
Players Tour Championship	Regular events	–	–	–	360	–	560	–	760	1000	1280	1600	2000
Players Tour Championship	Finals	–	–	–	–	–	–	840	1140	1500	1920	2400	3000
World Championship	Unseeded loser	–	800	1300	1800	2300	2800	–	3800	5000	6400	8000	10000
World Championship	Seeded loser	–	400	650	900	1150	1400	–	–	–	–	–	–
