= Players Tour Championship 2010/2011 – Event 6 =

Players Tour Championship 2010/2011 Event 6
Tournament information
- Dates: 14–17 October 2010
- Venue: World Snooker Academy
- City: Sheffield
- Country: England
- Organisation: World Snooker
- Format: Minor-ranking event
- Total prize fund: £50,000
- Winner's share: £10,000
- Highest break: Matthew Stevens (WAL) (142)

Final
- Champion: Dominic Dale (WAL)
- Runner-up: Martin Gould (ENG)
- Score: 4–3

The Players Tour Championship 2010/2011 – Event 6 (also known as Star Xing Pai Players Tour Championship 2010/2011 – Event 6 for sponsorship purposes) was a professional minor-ranking snooker tournament that took place over 14–17 October 2010 at the World Snooker Academy in Sheffield, England.

Dominic Dale won his third professional title by defeating Martin Gould 4–3 in the final.

== Prize fund and ranking points ==
The breakdown of prize money and ranking points of the event is shown below:

	Prize fund	Ranking points^{1}
Winner	£10,000	2,000
Runner Up	£5,000	1,600
Semi-finalist	£2,500	1,280
Quarter-finalist	£1,500	1,000
Last 16	£1,000	760
Last 32	£600	560
Last 64	£200	360
Total	£50,000	–

- ^{1} Only professional players can earn ranking points.

== Main draw ==
=== Preliminary round ===
Best of 7 frames

(England) Robbie Williams	3–4	(England) Sam Baird
(England) Matthew Day	w/o–w/d	(United Arab Emirates) Salim Ali
(England) Martin O'Donnell	3–4	(England) Craig Steadman
(England) Stephen Groves	0–4	(England) Ian Glover
(England) Andrew Milliard	2–4	(England) Andrew Norman
(England) James McGouran	4–0	(Wales) Jamie Clarke
(England) Mitchell Mann	4–1	(Belgium) Hans Blanckaert
(England) Rogelio Esteiro	0–4	(England) Michael Wild
(Belgium) Luca Brecel	2–4	(China) Chen Zhe
(England) Allan Taylor	w/o–w/d	(United Arab Emirates) Eissa Alsayed
(England) Shaun Parkes	0–4	(England) Ian Burns
(England) Marc Harman	0–4	(Germany) Lasse Münstermann
(England) Ben Harrison	4–2	(England) James Hill
(England) Rock Hui	0–4	(England) Oliver Brown
(England) Charlie Walters	4–0	(England) Steve Judd
(India) David Singh	4–0	(England) Ryan Duffy

(Republic of Ireland) Leo Fernandez	w/o–w/d	(United Arab Emirates) Mohammed Joker
(Scotland) Dale Smith	w/d–w/o	(England) Damian Wilks
(Pakistan) Sharrukh Nasir	1–4	(England) Michael Wasley
(England) Mike Hallett	3–4	(India) Lucky Vatnani
(England) Joel Walker	w/d–w/o	(England) Andy Lee
(England) Chris Norbury	w/o–w/d	(United Arab Emirates) Mohammed Shehab
(Singapore) Marvin Lim	0–4	(England) Stuart Carrington
(England) Stephen Ormerod	4–3	(England) Ian Stark
(England) James Leadbetter	3–4	(England) Robert Valiant
(England) Danny Douane	w/d–w/o	(England) John Whitty
(England) Farakh Ajaib	4–0	(England) Tony Knowles
(Singapore) Tommy Ang	4–1	(Saudi Arabia) Ahmed Aseeri
(England) Jamie Walker	4–3	(England) Jeff Cundy
(China) Tian Pengfei	3–4	(India) Aditya Mehta
(England) Daniel Skingle	0–4	(Wales) Kishan Hirani
(England) David Grace	4–2	(Scotland) Gary Thomson

=== Main rounds ===
==== Top half ====
===== Section 1 =====
Last 128; Best of 7 frames
(England) Barry Pinches	4
(England) Sam Baird	3
(Wales) Daniel Wells	4
(England) Matthew Day	0
(England) Matthew Couch	0
(England) Jimmy Michie	4
(England) Anthony Hamilton	3
(England) Craig Steadman	4
(England) Liam Highfield	4
(Thailand) Noppon Saengkham	1
(China) Ding Junhui	4
(England) Ian Glover	2
(England) Joe Jogia	4
(England) Andrew Norman	1
(England) Stuart Bingham	4
(England) Jamie O'Neill	3

Last 64; Best of 7 frames
(England) Barry Pinches	3
(Wales) Daniel Wells	4
(England) Jimmy Michie	4
(England) Craig Steadman	1
(England) Liam Highfield	2
(China) Ding Junhui	4
(England) Joe Jogia	0
(England) Stuart Bingham	4

Last 32; Best of 7 frames
(Wales) Daniel Wells	4
(England) Jimmy Michie	1
(China) Ding Junhui	2
(England) Stuart Bingham	4

Last 16; Best of 7 frames
(Wales) Daniel Wells	0
(England) Stuart Bingham	4

===== Section 2 =====
Last 128; Best of 7 frames
(Belgium) Bjorn Haneveer	3
(England) James McGouran	4
(England) Martin Gould	4
(England) Mitchell Mann	0
(Wales) Michael White	0
(Republic of Ireland) Michael Judge	4
(England) Ricky Walden	4
(England) Michael Wild	3
(England) Jimmy Robertson	2
(China) Chen Zhe	4
(Scotland) Anthony McGill	4
(England) Allan Taylor	1
(England) Ronnie O'Sullivan	w/d
(Thailand) Issara Kachaiwong	w/o
(England) Matthew Selt	3
(England) Ian Burns	4

Last 64; Best of 7 frames
(England) James McGouran	1
(England) Martin Gould	4
(Republic of Ireland) Michael Judge	1
(England) Ricky Walden	4
(China) Chen Zhe	1
(Scotland) Anthony McGill	4
(Thailand) Issara Kachaiwong	1
(England) Ian Burns	4

Last 32; Best of 7 frames
(England) Martin Gould	4
(England) Ricky Walden	1
(Scotland) Anthony McGill	4
(England) Ian Burns	2

Last 16; Best of 7 frames
(England) Martin Gould	4
(Scotland) Anthony McGill	2

===== Section 3 =====
Last 128; Best of 7 frames
(England) Adrian Gunnell	3
(Germany) Lasse Münstermann	4
(England) Ian McCulloch	4
(England) Ben Harrison	0
(England) Mark Joyce	4
(England) Oliver Brown	0
(China) Liu Chuang	4
(Scotland) Jamie Burnett	2
(England) Mark Davis	4
(England) Adam Wicheard	3
(England) Andy Hicks	4
(England) Charlie Walters	2
(England) Jack Lisowski	4
(India) David Singh	2
(England) Dave Harold	2
(Northern Ireland) Dermot McGlinchey	4

Last 64; Best of 7 frames
(Germany) Lasse Münstermann	0
(England) Ian McCulloch	4
(England) Mark Joyce	0
(China) Liu Chuang	4
(England) Mark Davis	3
(England) Andy Hicks	4
(England) Jack Lisowski	4
(Northern Ireland) Dermot McGlinchey	2

Last 32; Best of 7 frames
(England) Ian McCulloch	4
(China) Liu Chuang	3
(England) Andy Hicks	4
(England) Jack Lisowski	1

Last 16; Best of 7 frames
(England) Ian McCulloch	4
(England) Andy Hicks	2

===== Section 4 =====
Last 128; Best of 7 frames
(England) Peter Lines	4
(Republic of Ireland) David Morris	0
(Brazil) Igor Figueiredo	2
(Republic of Ireland) Leo Fernandez	4
(England) Stephen Lee	4
(England) Damian Wilks	0
(Scotland) Marcus Campbell	4
(Northern Ireland) Patrick Wallace	2
(England) Mark King	3
(Scotland) Graeme Dott	4
(England) Joe Perry	4
(England) Michael Wasley	1
(England) Judd Trump	4
(India) Lucky Vatnani	0
(England) Alfie Burden	4
(Thailand) Thanawat Thirapongpaiboon	3

Last 64; Best of 7 frames
(England) Peter Lines	4
(Republic of Ireland) Leo Fernandez	1
(England) Stephen Lee	1
(Scotland) Marcus Campbell	4
(Scotland) Graeme Dott	4
(England) Joe Perry	3
(England) Judd Trump	4
(England) Alfie Burden	2

Last 32; Best of 7 frames
(England) Peter Lines	0
(Scotland) Marcus Campbell	4
(Scotland) Graeme Dott	4
(England) Judd Trump	1

Last 16; Best of 7 frames
(Scotland) Marcus Campbell	4
(Scotland) Graeme Dott	1

==== Bottom half ====
===== Section 5 =====
Last 128; Best of 7 frames
(England) Mark Selby	4
(England) Andy Lee	0
(England) Steve Davis	w/d
(Wales) Jak Jones	w/o
(China) Xiao Guodong	4
(China) Zhang Anda	0
(England) Andrew Higginson	4
(Norway) Kurt Maflin	0
(Wales) Jamie Jones	4
(England) Reanne Evans	1
(England) Peter Ebdon	4
(England) Chris Norbury	1
(Hong Kong) Marco Fu	4
(England) Stuart Pettman	3
(England) Mike Dunn	1
(Northern Ireland) Mark Allen	4

Last 64; Best of 7 frames
(England) Mark Selby	4
(Wales) Jak Jones	0
(China) Xiao Guodong	4
(England) Andrew Higginson	3
(Wales) Jamie Jones	4
(England) Peter Ebdon	3
(Hong Kong) Marco Fu	2
(Northern Ireland) Mark Allen	4

Last 32; Best of 7 frames
(England) Mark Selby	4
(China) Xiao Guodong	3
(Wales) Jamie Jones	4
(Northern Ireland) Mark Allen	3

Last 16; Best of 7 frames
(England) Mark Selby	4
(Wales) Jamie Jones	0

===== Section 6 =====
Last 128; Best of 7 frames
(England) Robert Milkins	2
(England) Stuart Carrington	4
(Australia) Neil Robertson	4
(England) Rod Lawler	1
(Wales) Dominic Dale	4
(England) Stephen Ormerod	0
(England) Kyren Wilson	4
(England) Kuldesh Johal	2
(Republic of Ireland) Fergal O'Brien	4
(England) Robert Valiant	1
(England) Ben Woollaston	2
(England) Simon Bedford	4
(England) Tom Ford	4
(England) John Whitty	1
(Wales) Matthew Stevens	4
(Scotland) Stephen Hendry	1

Last 64; Best of 7 frames
(England) Stuart Carrington	1
(Australia) Neil Robertson	4
(Wales) Dominic Dale	4
(England) Kyren Wilson	2
(Republic of Ireland) Fergal O'Brien	4
(England) Simon Bedford	1
(England) Tom Ford	3
(Wales) Matthew Stevens	4

Last 32; Best of 7 frames
(Australia) Neil Robertson	1
(Wales) Dominic Dale	4
(Republic of Ireland) Fergal O'Brien	0
(Wales) Matthew Stevens	4

Last 16; Best of 7 frames
(Wales) Dominic Dale	4
(Wales) Matthew Stevens	1

===== Section 7 =====
Last 128; Best of 7 frames
(Wales) Andrew Pagett	4
(Wales) Ryan Day	2
(England) Paul Davison	4
(England) Farakh Ajaib	2
(Scotland) Alan McManus	4
(Singapore) Tommy Ang	1
(England) Shaun Murphy	4
(England) David Gilbert	2
(China) Liang Wenbo	4
(Thailand) James Wattana	1
(England) Rory McLeod	1
(Republic of Ireland) Joe Delaney	4
(England) Barry Hawkins	4
(England) Jamie Walker	1
(England) Justin Astley	2
(Northern Ireland) Joe Swail	4

Last 64; Best of 7 frames
(Wales) Andrew Pagett	1
(England) Paul Davison	4
(Scotland) Alan McManus	2
(England) Shaun Murphy	4
(China) Liang Wenbo	4
(Republic of Ireland) Joe Delaney	0
(England) Barry Hawkins	0
(Northern Ireland) Joe Swail	4

Last 32; Best of 7 frames
(England) Paul Davison	1
(England) Shaun Murphy	4
(China) Liang Wenbo	4
(Northern Ireland) Joe Swail	1

Last 16; Best of 7 frames
(England) Shaun Murphy	2
(China) Liang Wenbo	4

===== Section 8 =====
Last 128; Best of 7 frames
(England) Jamie Cope	4
(England) Michael Holt	0
(England) Jimmy White	4
(India) Aditya Mehta	2
(Northern Ireland) Gerard Greene	2
(Scotland) James McBain	4
(Malta) Tony Drago	4
(Wales) Kishan Hirani	0
(China) Liu Song	4
(England) David Grace	1
(Scotland) Stephen Maguire	3
(Republic of Ireland) Ken Doherty	4
(England) Nigel Bond	3
(Germany) Patrick Einsle	4
(Wales) Mark Williams	w/d
(England) Ali Carter	w/o

Last 64; Best of 7 frames
(England) Jamie Cope	1
(England) Jimmy White	4
(Scotland) James McBain	4
(Malta) Tony Drago	1
(China) Liu Song	4
(Republic of Ireland) Ken Doherty	2
(Germany) Patrick Einsle	3
(England) Ali Carter	4

Last 32; Best of 7 frames
(England) Jimmy White	4
(Scotland) James McBain	3
(China) Liu Song	0
(England) Ali Carter	4

Last 16; Best of 7 frames
(England) Jimmy White	4
(England) Ali Carter	2

==== Finals ====
Quarter-finals; Best of 7 frames		Semi-finals; Best of 7 frames		Final; Best of 7 frames
(England) Stuart Bingham	2
(England) Martin Gould	4	(England) Martin Gould	4
(England) Ian McCulloch	1	(Scotland) Marcus Campbell	1
(Scotland) Marcus Campbell	4			(England) Martin Gould	3
(England) Mark Selby	3			(Wales) Dominic Dale	4
(Wales) Dominic Dale	4	(Wales) Dominic Dale	4
(China) Liang Wenbo	4	(China) Liang Wenbo	1
(England) Jimmy White	3

== Century breaks ==
- 142, 113, 105 – Matthew Stevens
- 138 – Xiao Guodong
- 137, 103, 102 – Andy Hicks
- 136, 127 – Dominic Dale
- 135, 102 – Ding Junhui
- 133 – Neil Robertson
- 132 – Chen Zhe
- 132 – Daniel Wells
- 131, 110 – Liang Wenbo
- 128 – Anthony McGill
- 125 – Marco Fu
- 122, 108 – Judd Trump
- 120 – Andrew Higginson
- 117 – Barry Hawkins
- 116 – Mark Selby
- 115 – Stuart Carrington
- 113 – Rod Lawler
- 113 – Jimmy White
- 112 – James McBain
- 111 – Alan McManus
- 107 – Adrian Gunnell
- 104 – Jamie Burnett
- 103, 102 – Adam Wicheard
- 103 – Liam Highfield
- 103 – Jimmy Robertson
- 103 – Liu Song
- 101 – Robert Milkins
- 101 – Simon Bedford
- 101 – David Grace
- 101 – Mark Allen
