= Players Tour Championship 2010/2011 – Event 2 =

Players Tour Championship 2010/2011 Event 2
Tournament information
- Dates: 8–11 July 2010
- Venue: World Snooker Academy
- City: Sheffield
- Country: England
- Organisation: World Snooker
- Format: Minor-ranking event
- Total prize fund: £50,000
- Winner's share: £10,000
- Highest break: Judd Trump (ENG) (144)

Final
- Champion: Mark Selby (ENG)
- Runner-up: Barry Pinches (ENG)
- Score: 4–3

The Players Tour Championship 2010/2011 – Event 2 (also known as Star Xing Pai Players Tour Championship 2010/2011 – Event 2 for sponsorship purposes) was a professional minor-ranking snooker tournament that took place between 8–11 July 2010 at the World Snooker Academy in Sheffield, England.

Mark Selby won in the final 4–3 against Barry Pinches, despite at one point trailing 1–3.

== Prize fund and ranking points ==
The breakdown of prize money and ranking points of the event is shown below:

	Prize fund	Ranking points^{1}
Winner	£10,000	2,000
Runner-up	£5,000	1,600
Semi-finalist	£2,500	1,280
Quarter-finalist	£1,500	1,000
Last 16	£1,000	760
Last 32	£600	560
Last 64	£200	360
Total	£50,000	–

- ^{1} Only professional players can earn ranking points.

== Main draw ==
=== Preliminary round ===
Best of 7 frames

(England) Lee Spick	4–1	(England) Shaun Parkes
(England) Paul Metcalf	4–2	(Northern Ireland) Raymond Fry
(England) Tony Knowles	2–4	(England) Mitchell Travis
(China) Chen Zhe	4–2	(Pakistan) Sharrukh Nasir
(England) Kamran Ashraf	1–4	(England) David Gray
(Australia) Jamie Brown	4–1	(England) James Silverwood
(Scotland) William Thomson	1–4	(England) Charlie Walters
(England) Craig Steadman	4–0	(England) Rogelio Esteiro
(England) Callum Downing	0–4	(England) Stephen Craigie
(England) Jake Nicholson	4–2	(England) Jim Buck
(England) Joel Walker	4–0	(Wales) Callum Lloyd
(England) Robbie Williams	4–2	(England) Stephen Ormerod
(Denmark) Ejler Hame	0–4	(England) Alex Davies
(England) Adam Duffy	4–1	(England) James Hill
(Qatar) Ali Al Obaidly	w/o–w/d	(China) Yu Delu
(England) Jamie Curtis-Barrett	4–2	(England) Abdulrahman Quari
(England) Ashik Nathwani	1–4	(England) Samuel Thistlewhite
(England) Lee Farebrother	4–2	(England) Terry Challenger

(Wales) Jamie Clarke	4–0	(Qatar) Ahmed Saif
(England) Stephen Groves	3–4	(England) Jamie Walker
(England) Andy Lee	0–4	(Wales) Alex Taubman
(England) Farakh Ajaib	3–4	(Pakistan) Shokat Ali
(England) Robert Valiant	4–2	(England) Gavin Butler
(England) David Grace	4–3	(England) David Portman
(England) Sam Craigie	3–4	(England) Danny Douane
(England) Sam Baird	4–1	(Qatar) Mohanna Al Obaidly
(England) Ian Glover	4–3	(England) Jack Culligan
(England) Jordan Rimmer	1–4	(England) James McGouran
(England) Oliver Brown	0–4	(England) Sam Harvey
(England) Craig Barber	4–2	(England) Marc Harman
(England) Jason Stockton	0–4	(England) Chris Norbury
(England) Michael Wild	4–2	(England) Mark J Miller
(England) Ian Burns	w/o–w/d	(Scotland) Hugh Abernethy
(England) Damian Wilks	4–3	(England) Jeff Cundy
(England) Stuart Carrington	4–0	(Turkey) Yahya Seedat
(England) Greg Davis	4–3	(England) Martin O'Donnell

=== Main rounds ===
==== Top half ====
===== Section 1 =====
Last 128; Best of 7 frames
(Wales) Mark Williams	4
(England) Michael Holt	3
(England) Mark Davis	4
(Wales) Michael White	0
(England) Mike Dunn	4
(England) Robert Milkins	0
(England) Mark Joyce	4
(England) Anthony Hamilton	2
(England) Mark Selby	4
(England) Rod Lawler	0
(England) Peter Ebdon	2
(England) Shaun Murphy	4
(China) Liu Chuang	4
(England) Reanne Evans	2
(England) Ben Harrison	w/o
(England) Ian McCulloch	w/d

Last 64; Best of 7 frames
(Wales) Mark Williams	2
(England) Mark Davis	4
(England) Mike Dunn	1
(England) Mark Joyce	4
(England) Mark Selby	4
(England) Shaun Murphy	1
(China) Liu Chuang	4
(England) Ben Harrison	0

Last 32; Best of 7 frames
(England) Mark Davis	4
(England) Mark Joyce	1
(England) Mark Selby	4
(China) Liu Chuang	0

Last 16; Best of 7 frames
(England) Mark Davis	1
(England) Mark Selby	4

===== Section 2 =====
Last 128; Best of 7 frames
(England) Ben Woollaston	2
(Northern Ireland) Dermot McGlinchey	4
(Scotland) Marcus Campbell	4
(Wales) Jak Jones	2
(Malta) Tony Drago	1
(England) Jimmy Robertson	4
(England) Andy Hicks	4
(England) Simon Bedford	2
(England) Joe Jogia	w/o
(Republic of Ireland) Ken Doherty	w/d
(England) Liam Highfield	4
(England) Adam Wicheard	3
(England) Judd Trump	4
(England) David Gilbert	2
(England) Justin Astley	0
(England) Joe Perry	4

Last 64; Best of 7 frames
(Northern Ireland) Dermot McGlinchey	1
(Scotland) Marcus Campbell	4
(England) Jimmy Robertson	4
(England) Andy Hicks	2
(England) Joe Jogia	1
(England) Liam Highfield	4
(England) Judd Trump	4
(England) Joe Perry	1

Last 32; Best of 7 frames
(Scotland) Marcus Campbell	2
(England) Jimmy Robertson	4
(England) Liam Highfield	4
(England) Judd Trump	2

Last 16; Best of 7 frames
(England) Jimmy Robertson	4
(England) Liam Highfield	1

===== Section 3 =====
Last 128; Best of 7 frames
(England) Nigel Bond	2
(England) Stuart Pettman	4
(England) Stephen Lee	4
(England) Jack Lisowski	3
(Wales) Jamie Jones	4
(Wales) Paul Davies	1
(England) Andrew Norman	2
(Wales) Andrew Pagett	4
(England) Michael Wasley	4
(Scotland) James McBain	3
(Belgium) Bjorn Haneveer	4
(Wales) Ryan Day	1
(England) Barry Hawkins	3
(England) Ali Carter	4
(England) Peter Lines	4
(England) David Bailey	1

Last 64; Best of 7 frames
(England) Stuart Pettman	3
(England) Stephen Lee	4
(Wales) Jamie Jones	2
(Wales) Andrew Pagett	4
(England) Michael Wasley	4
(Belgium) Bjorn Haneveer	1
(England) Ali Carter	3
(England) Peter Lines	4

Last 32; Best of 7 frames
(England) Stephen Lee	3
(Wales) Andrew Pagett	4
(England) Michael Wasley	1
(England) Peter Lines	4

Last 16; Best of 7 frames
(Wales) Andrew Pagett	4
(England) Peter Lines	1

===== Section 4 =====
Last 128; Best of 7 frames
(Wales) Dominic Dale	2
(England) Jamie O'Neill	4
(Scotland) Alan McManus	4
(Germany) Patrick Einsle	1
(Northern Ireland) Patrick Wallace	1
(England) Kuldesh Johal	4
(England) Matthew Selt	4
(China) Zhang Anda	0
(England) Matthew Couch	3
(England) Lee Spick	4
(England) Rory McLeod	4
(England) Paul Metcalf	0
(Hong Kong) Marco Fu	4
(England) Mitchell Travis	2
(England) Nick Jennings	4
(China) Chen Zhe	1

Last 64; Best of 7 frames
(England) Jamie O'Neill	2
(Scotland) Alan McManus	4
(England) Kuldesh Johal	4
(England) Matthew Selt	1
(England) Lee Spick	1
(England) Rory McLeod	4
(Hong Kong) Marco Fu	4
(England) Nick Jennings	3

Last 32; Best of 7 frames
(Scotland) Alan McManus	4
(England) Kuldesh Johal	3
(England) Rory McLeod	0
(Hong Kong) Marco Fu	4

Last 16; Best of 7 frames
(Scotland) Alan McManus	2
(Hong Kong) Marco Fu	4

==== Bottom half ====
===== Section 5 =====
Last 128; Best of 7 frames
(England) Jamie Cope	4
(England) David Gray	2
(Scotland) Graeme Dott	4
(Australia) Jamie Brown	1
(Northern Ireland) Joe Swail	4
(England) Charlie Walters	2
(England) Stuart Bingham	4
(England) Craig Steadman	2
(England) Jimmy White	3
(England) Stephen Craigie	4
(Norway) Kurt Maflin	4
(England) Jake Nicholson	0
(England) Tom Ford	4
(England) Joel Walker	0
(Brazil) Igor Figueiredo	4
(England) Robbie Williams	3

Last 64; Best of 7 frames
(England) Jamie Cope	4
(Scotland) Graeme Dott	3
(Northern Ireland) Joe Swail	2
(England) Stuart Bingham	4
(England) Stephen Craigie	4
(Norway) Kurt Maflin	0
(England) Tom Ford	4
(Brazil) Igor Figueiredo	1

Last 32; Best of 7 frames
(England) Jamie Cope	1
(England) Stuart Bingham	4
(England) Stephen Craigie	4
(England) Tom Ford	3

Last 16; Best of 7 frames
(England) Stuart Bingham	4
(England) Stephen Craigie	1

===== Section 6 =====
Last 128; Best of 7 frames
(England) Barry Pinches	4
(England) Alex Davies	0
(England) Andrew Higginson	2
(England) Adam Duffy	4
(England) Paul Davison	4
(Qatar) Ali Al Obaidly	0
(Republic of Ireland) Fergal O'Brien	4
(England) Jamie Curtis-Barrett	3
(China) Xiao Guodong	w/d
(England) Samuel Thistlewhite	w/o
(England) Alfie Burden	4
(England) Lee Farebrother	1
(Belgium) Luca Brecel	4
(Wales) Jamie Clarke	3
(England) Martin Gould	4
(England) Jamie Walker	3

Last 64; Best of 7 frames
(England) Barry Pinches	4
(England) Adam Duffy	1
(England) Paul Davison	4
(Republic of Ireland) Fergal O'Brien	2
(England) Samuel Thistlewhite	2
(England) Alfie Burden	4
(Belgium) Luca Brecel	3
(England) Martin Gould	4

Last 32; Best of 7 frames
(England) Barry Pinches	4
(England) Paul Davison	0
(England) Alfie Burden	4
(England) Martin Gould	0

Last 16; Best of 7 frames
(England) Barry Pinches	4
(England) Alfie Burden	1

===== Section 7 =====
Last 128; Best of 7 frames
(England) Mark King	4
(Wales) Alex Taubman	0
(England) Ricky Walden	4
(Pakistan) Shokat Ali	0
(Wales) Matthew Stevens	4
(England) Robert Valiant	0
(Scotland) Jamie Burnett	3
(England) David Grace	4
(China) Liu Song	4
(England) Danny Douane	0
(Northern Ireland) Gerard Greene	4
(England) Sam Baird	3
(England) Allan Taylor	4
(England) Ian Glover	3
(England) Kyren Wilson	2
(England) James McGouran	4

Last 64; Best of 7 frames
(England) Mark King	2
(England) Ricky Walden	4
(Wales) Matthew Stevens	4
(England) David Grace	3
(China) Liu Song	1
(Northern Ireland) Gerard Greene	4
(England) Allan Taylor	3
(England) James McGouran	4

Last 32; Best of 7 frames
(England) Ricky Walden	4
(Wales) Matthew Stevens	1
(Northern Ireland) Gerard Greene	4
(England) James McGouran	0

Last 16; Best of 7 frames
(England) Ricky Walden	2
(Northern Ireland) Gerard Greene	4

===== Section 8 =====
Last 128; Best of 7 frames
(Scotland) Anthony McGill	4
(England) Sam Harvey	1
(England) Jimmy Michie	4
(England) Craig Barber	2
(England) Dave Harold	4
(England) Chris Norbury	2
(England) Adrian Gunnell	1
(England) Michael Wild	4
(Wales) Daniel Wells	4
(England) Ian Burns	3
(Northern Ireland) Jordan Brown	4
(England) Damian Wilks	0
(England) Mitchell Mann	4
(England) Stuart Carrington	3
(Scotland) Stephen Maguire	4
(England) Greg Davis	0

Last 64; Best of 7 frames
(Scotland) Anthony McGill	4
(England) Jimmy Michie	1
(England) Dave Harold	4
(England) Michael Wild	2
(Wales) Daniel Wells	4
(Northern Ireland) Jordan Brown	2
(England) Mitchell Mann	3
(Scotland) Stephen Maguire	4

Last 32; Best of 7 frames
(Scotland) Anthony McGill	4
(England) Dave Harold	1
(Wales) Daniel Wells	0
(Scotland) Stephen Maguire	4

Last 16; Best of 7 frames
(Scotland) Anthony McGill	4
(Scotland) Stephen Maguire	0

==== Finals ====
Quarter-finals; Best of 7 frames		Semi-finals; Best of 7 frames		Final; Best of 7 frames
(England) Mark Selby	4
(England) Jimmy Robertson	2	(England) Mark Selby	4
(Wales) Andrew Pagett	2	(Hong Kong) Marco Fu	2
(Hong Kong) Marco Fu	4			(England) Mark Selby	4
(England) Stuart Bingham	2			(England) Barry Pinches	3
(England) Barry Pinches	4	(England) Barry Pinches	4
(Northern Ireland) Gerard Greene	4	(Northern Ireland) Gerard Greene	1
(Scotland) Anthony McGill	3

== Final ==
Final: Best of 7 frames. World Snooker Academy, Sheffield, England, 11 July 2010.
Mark Selby; England	4–3	Barry Pinches; England
109–13, 15–72 (72), 0–84 (79), 5–95 (95), 77–8, 133–0 (133), 116–0 (116)
133	Highest break	95
2	Century breaks	0
2	50+ breaks	3

== Century breaks ==
- 144, 138, 101 – Judd Trump
- 143 – Jimmy White
- 142, 133, 127, 125, 116, 111, 110, 102 – Mark Selby
- 140 – Stephen Maguire
- 137 – Jamie Cope
- 136 – Jimmy Robertson
- 135, 115 – Joe Perry
- 134 – Tony Drago
- 127, 110, 104, 103 – Anthony McGill
- 121 – Bjorn Haneveer
- 116, 100 – Stuart Bingham
- 115, 103, 102 – Barry Pinches
- 111 – James McBain
- 110 – David Gilbert
- 108, 102 – David Gray
- 108 – Tom Ford
- 106 – Michael Wasley
- 105 – Paul Davison
- 105 – David Grace
- 105 – Ricky Walden
- 104 – Matthew Stevens
- 102 – Nick Jennings
- 100 – Gerard Greene
- 100 – Stuart Carrington
- 100 – Joe Swail
- 100 – Lee Spick
- 100 – Graeme Dott
- 100 – Ali Carter
- 100 – Patrick Wallace
