= Euro Players Tour Championship 2010/2011 – Event 5 =

Euro Players Tour Championship 2010/2011 Event 5
Tournament information
- Dates: 12–14 November 2010
- Venue: Sparkassen Arena
- City: Hamm
- Country: Germany
- Organisation: World Snooker
- Format: Minor-ranking event
- Total prize fund: €50,000
- Winner's share: €10,000
- Highest break: Joe Perry (ENG) (139)

Final
- Champion: John Higgins (SCO)
- Runner-up: Shaun Murphy (ENG)
- Score: 4–2

The Euro Players Tour Championship 2010/2011 – Event 5 (also known as the 2010 Ruhr Championship) was a professional minor-ranking snooker tournament that took place between 12–14 November 2010 at the Sparkassen Arena in Hamm, Germany.

John Higgins won in the final 4–2 against Shaun Murphy.

== Prize fund and ranking points ==
The breakdown of prize money and ranking points of the event is shown below:

| | Prize fund | Ranking points^{1} |
|---|---|---|
| Winner | €10,000 | 2,000 |
| Runner-up | €5,000 | 1,600 |
| Semi-finalist | €2,500 | 1,280 |
| Quarter-finalist | €1,400 | 1,000 |
| Last 16 | €1,000 | 760 |
| Last 32 | €500 | 560 |
| Last 64 | €200 | 360 |
| Plate winner^{2} | €1,500 | – |
| Plate runner-up^{2} | €500 | – |
| Total | €50,000 | – |

- ^{1} Only professional players can earn ranking points.
- ^{2} Prize money earned from the Plate competition does not qualify for inclusion in the Order of Merit.

== Main draw ==
=== Top half ===
==== Section 1 ====
Last 128; Best of 7 frames
(England) Mark Davis | 3
(Belgium) Luca Brecel | 4
(England) Ali Carter | w/d
(Germany) Habib Shalchian | w/o
(England) Adrian Gunnell | w/d
(Wales) Ryan Day | w/o
(England) Matthew Couch | 1
(England) Robert Milkins | 4
(England) Jimmy White | 0
(England) Rod Lawler | 4
(China) Xiao Guodong | 4
(Germany) Ronni Beniesch | 0
(England) Peter Ebdon | 4
(England) Kuldesh Johal | 2

Last 64; Best of 7 frames
(England) Barry Pinches | 4
(Belgium) Luca Brecel | 0
(Germany) Habib Shalchian | 1
(Wales) Ryan Day | 4
(England) Robert Milkins | 4
(England) Rod Lawler | 0
(China) Xiao Guodong | 1
(England) Peter Ebdon | 4

Last 32; Best of 7 frames
(England) Barry Pinches | 4
(Wales) Ryan Day | 3
(England) Robert Milkins | 4
(England) Peter Ebdon | 2

Last 16; Best of 7 frames
(England) Barry Pinches | 4
(England) Robert Milkins | 1

==== Section 2 ====
Last 128; Best of 7 frames
(England) Andy Hicks | 4
(Germany) Christopher Frömmel | 0
(Scotland) Graeme Dott | 4
(England) Reanne Evans | 0
(Malta) Tony Drago | 4
(Belgium) Hans Blanckaert | 0
(England) Stuart Bingham | 4
(Belgium) Mario Van Herk | 0
(England) Rory McLeod | 4
(China) Chen Zhe | 2
(England) Mark Joyce | 3
(Republic of Ireland) Joe Delaney | 4
(Scotland) Anthony McGill | 4
(France) Stéphane Ochoiski | 0

Last 64; Best of 7 frames
(England) Andy Hicks | 1
(Scotland) Graeme Dott | 4
(Malta) Tony Drago | 3
(England) Stuart Bingham | 4
(England) Judd Trump | 4
(England) Rory McLeod | 2
(Republic of Ireland) Joe Delaney | 2
(Scotland) Anthony McGill | 4

Last 32; Best of 7 frames
(Scotland) Graeme Dott | 4
(England) Stuart Bingham | 3
(England) Judd Trump | 4
(Scotland) Anthony McGill | 0

Last 16; Best of 7 frames
(Scotland) Graeme Dott | 4
(England) Judd Trump | 0

==== Section 3 ====
Last 128; Best of 7 frames
(England) Michael Wasley | 1
(Germany) Patrick Einsle | 4
(Northern Ireland) Joe Swail | 2
(Republic of Ireland) Ken Doherty | 4
(Wales) Daniel Wells | 4
(Germany) Benjamin Frömmel | 0
(England) Mark King | 4
(Thailand) Noppon Saengkham | 0
(England) Dave Harold | w/o
(England) Danny Douane | n/s
(England) Joe Jogia | 2
(Scotland) John Higgins | 4

Last 64; Best of 7 frames
(England) Tom Ford | 4
(Germany) Patrick Einsle | 3
(Republic of Ireland) Ken Doherty | 4
(Wales) Daniel Wells | 3
(England) Martin Gould | 4
(England) Mark King | 1
(England) Dave Harold | 0
(Scotland) John Higgins | 4

Last 32; Best of 7 frames
(England) Tom Ford | 4
(Republic of Ireland) Ken Doherty | 0
(England) Martin Gould | 3
(Scotland) John Higgins | 4

Last 16; Best of 7 frames
(England) Tom Ford | 3
(Scotland) John Higgins | 4

==== Section 4 ====
Last 128; Best of 7 frames
(England) Allan Taylor | 4
(Germany) Ralph Müller | 0
(England) Ricky Walden | 4
(Germany) Nicole Breitenstein | 0
(England) Nigel Bond | 3
(Thailand) Thanawat Thirapongpaiboon | 4
(England) Liam Highfield | 4
(Germany) Robert Drahn | 0
(Northern Ireland) Gerard Greene | w/o
(Scotland) Stephen Hendry | w/d
(Scotland) Alan McManus | 4
(Germany) Dieter Meier | 0
(England) Anthony Hamilton | 4
(Thailand) Issara Kachaiwong | 3

Last 64; Best of 7 frames
(England) Allan Taylor | 0
(England) Ricky Walden | 4
(Thailand) Thanawat Thirapongpaiboon | 3
(England) Liam Highfield | 4
(Wales) Dominic Dale | 4
(Northern Ireland) Gerard Greene | 1
(Scotland) Alan McManus | 1
(England) Anthony Hamilton | 4

Last 32; Best of 7 frames
(England) Ricky Walden | 4
(England) Liam Highfield | 1
(Wales) Dominic Dale | 3
(England) Anthony Hamilton | 4

Last 16; Best of 7 frames
(England) Ricky Walden | 3
(England) Anthony Hamilton | 4

=== Bottom half ===
==== Section 5 ====
Last 128; Best of 7 frames
(England) Barry Hawkins | 4
(England) Michael Holt | 2
(Northern Ireland) Mark Allen | w/o
(Scotland) Jamie Burnett | w/d
(England) Ronnie O'Sullivan | n/s
(Germany) Michael Heeger | w/o
(England) Stephen Lee | 4
(England) Martin O'Donnell | 3
(England) Matthew Selt | w/o
(Belgium) Kevin Van Hove | w/d
(England) Alfie Burden | 4
(England) Andrew Norman | 1
(China) Liu Chuang | 4
(Wales) Jak Jones | 2

Last 64; Best of 7 frames
(Wales) Mark Williams | 4
(England) Barry Hawkins | 2
(Northern Ireland) Mark Allen | 4
(Germany) Michael Heeger | 0
(England) Stephen Lee | 4
(England) Matthew Selt | 0
(England) Alfie Burden | 4
(China) Liu Chuang | 2

Last 32; Best of 7 frames
(Wales) Mark Williams | 3
(Northern Ireland) Mark Allen | 4
(England) Stephen Lee | 4
(England) Alfie Burden | 2

Last 16; Best of 7 frames
(Northern Ireland) Mark Allen | 4
(England) Stephen Lee | 2

==== Section 6 ====
Last 128; Best of 7 frames
(England) Jimmy Robertson | 1
(England) Jimmy Michie | 4
(Brazil) Igor Figueiredo | 4
(Belgium) Jacob Stacha | 0
(Wales) Jamie Jones | 1
(England) Adam Wicheard | 4
(England) Steve Davis | w/d
(Norway) Kurt Maflin | w/o
(China) Liu Song | 4
(Netherlands) Maurice Le Duc | 0
(England) Ben Woollaston | 2
(Republic of Ireland) David Morris | 4
(England) Peter Lines | 4
(England) Kyren Wilson | 1

Last 64; Best of 7 frames
(Hong Kong) Marco Fu | w/d
(England) Jimmy Michie | w/o
(Brazil) Igor Figueiredo | 2
(England) Adam Wicheard | 4
(Norway) Kurt Maflin | 4
(China) Liu Song | 1
(Republic of Ireland) David Morris | 3
(England) Peter Lines | 4

Last 32; Best of 7 frames
(England) Jimmy Michie | 4
(England) Adam Wicheard | 3
(Norway) Kurt Maflin | 2
(England) Peter Lines | 4

Last 16; Best of 7 frames
(England) Jimmy Michie | 0
(England) Peter Lines | 4

==== Section 7 ====
Last 128; Best of 7 frames
(Australia) Neil Robertson | w/d
(Germany) Jürgen Kesseler | w/o
(England) Jack Lisowski | 4
(England) Oliver Brown | 0
(England) Andrew Higginson | 4
(England) Jamie O'Neill | 3
(Scotland) Marcus Campbell | 4
(Germany) Ralf Günzel | 0
(England) Mike Dunn | 4
(Belgium) Tomasz Skalski | 0
(Wales) Andrew Pagett | 4
(Germany) Andreas Cieslak | 1
(England) Ian McCulloch | 4
(Germany) Lasse Münstermann | 0

Last 64; Best of 7 frames
(Germany) Jürgen Kesseler | 0
(England) Jack Lisowski | 4
(England) Andrew Higginson | 2
(Scotland) Marcus Campbell | 4
(England) Shaun Murphy | 4
(England) Mike Dunn | 0
(Wales) Andrew Pagett | 2
(England) Ian McCulloch | 4

Last 32; Best of 7 frames
(England) Jack Lisowski | 2
(Scotland) Marcus Campbell | 4
(England) Shaun Murphy | 4
(England) Ian McCulloch | 1

Last 16; Best of 7 frames
(Scotland) Marcus Campbell | 2
(England) Shaun Murphy | 4

==== Section 8 ====
Last 128; Best of 7 frames
(Belgium) Bjorn Haneveer | w/o
(England) Justin Astley | w/d
(England) Jamie Cope | 2
(China) Zhang Anda | 4
(Republic of Ireland) Fergal O'Brien | 4
(Northern Ireland) Dermot McGlinchey | 2
(England) Paul Davison | 4
(Netherlands) Mario Wehrmann | 2
(Wales) Matthew Stevens | w/o
(England) Tony Knowles | w/d
(England) Joe Perry | 4
(Denmark) Rune Kampe | 0
(Wales) Michael White | 3
(India) David Singh | 4

Last 64; Best of 7 frames
(Belgium) Bjorn Haneveer | 0
(China) Zhang Anda | 4
(Republic of Ireland) Fergal O'Brien | 3
(England) Paul Davison | 4
(Wales) Matthew Stevens | 0
(England) Joe Perry | 4
(England) Mark Selby | 4
(India) David Singh | 2

Last 32; Best of 7 frames
(China) Zhang Anda | 1
(England) Paul Davison | 4
(England) Joe Perry | 4
(England) Mark Selby | 2

Last 16; Best of 7 frames
(England) Paul Davison | 4
(England) Joe Perry | 3

=== Finals ===
| Quarter-finals; Best of 7 frames | | Semi-finals; Best of 7 frames | | Final; Best of 7 frames |
| (England) Barry Pinches | 1 |
| (Scotland) Graeme Dott | 4 | (Scotland) Graeme Dott | 1 |
| (Scotland) John Higgins | 4 | (Scotland) John Higgins | 4 |
| (England) Anthony Hamilton | 2 | | | (Scotland) John Higgins | 4 |
| (Northern Ireland) Mark Allen | 4 | | | (England) Shaun Murphy | 2 |
| (England) Peter Lines | 0 | (Northern Ireland) Mark Allen | 1 |
| (England) Shaun Murphy | 4 | (England) Shaun Murphy | 4 |
| (England) Paul Davison | 1 |

== Century breaks ==
- 139, 135, 133 – Joe Perry
- 136 – Paul Davison
- 133, 129 – Graeme Dott
- 132, 107, 107, 101 – John Higgins
- 130, 105, 100 – Shaun Murphy
- 126 – Adam Wicheard
- 121 – Rory McLeod
- 120, 105 – Mark Allen
- 119, 102 – Andy Hicks
- 118, 107 – Judd Trump
- 118, 100 – Anthony Hamilton
- 113 – Daniel Wells
- 112 – Mark Selby
- 108, 103 – Tom Ford
- 108 – Mark Davis
- 107 – Peter Ebdon
- 107 – Liu Song
- 106, 103 – Mark Williams
- 106, 101 – Stuart Bingham
- 106 – Marcus Campbell
- 104 – Stephen Lee
- 104, 100 – Dominic Dale
- 103 – Kurt Maflin
- 100 – Michael White
