= Players Tour Championship 2010/2011 – Event 1 =

Players Tour Championship 2010/2011 Event 1
Tournament information
- Dates: 24–27 June 2010
- Venue: World Snooker Academy
- City: Sheffield
- Country: England
- Organisation: World Snooker
- Format: Minor-ranking event
- Total prize fund: £50,000
- Winner's share: £10,000
- Highest break: Kurt Maflin (NOR) (147)

Final
- Champion: Mark Williams (WAL)
- Runner-up: Stephen Maguire (SCO)
- Score: 4–0

The Players Tour Championship 2010/2011 – Event 1 (also known as Star Xing Pai Players Tour Championship 2010/2011 – Event 1 for sponsorship purposes) was a professional minor-ranking snooker tournament that took place over 24–27 June 2010 at the World Snooker Academy in Sheffield, England. It was contested by 75 professional players and 73 amateurs.

Kurt Maflin made the 71st official maximum break during his last 128 match against Michał Zieliński. This was Maflin's first official 147.

Mark Williams won the final 4–0 against Stephen Maguire.

== Prize fund and ranking points ==
The breakdown of prize money and ranking points of the event is shown below:

	Prize fund	Ranking points^{1}
Winner	£10,000	2,000
Runner Up	£5,000	1,600
Semi-finalist	£2,500	1,280
Quarter-finalist	£1,500	1,000
Last 16	£1,000	760
Last 32	£600	560
Last 64	£200	360
Total	£50,000	–

- ^{1} Only professional players can earn ranking points.

== Main draw ==
=== Preliminary round ===
Best of 7 frames

(England) Greg Davis	w/o–w/d	(England) David Gray
(England) Craig Steadman	1–4	(India) Aditya Mehta
(England) Mitchell Travis	2–4	(England) Sam Craigie
(China) Chen Zhe	3–4	(England) Stephen Ormerod
(England) David Craggs	4–0	(England) Jamie Walker
(England) Charlie Walters	2–4	(England) Stephen Craigie
(England) Kamran Ashraf	4–2	(England) Richard Somauroo
(England) Mark Miller	0–4	(Pakistan) Sharrukh Nasir
(England) Jake Nicholson	1–4	(Northern Ireland) Jordan Brown
(Republic of Ireland) Robert Redmond	4–0	(England) Jack Culligan
(England) Sam Harvey	0–4	(England) Shaun Parkes

(England) Nick Jennings	4–1	(England) Stephen Groves
(England) Damian Wilks	1–4	(England) Andrew Norman
(England) Martin O'Donnell	4–2	(England) Jeff Cundy
(England) Alex Davies	3–4	(Poland) Michał Zieliński
(England) Ryan Clark	0–4	(Scotland) Hugh Abernethy
(England) Oliver Brown	0–4	(Hong Kong) Andy Lee
(England) Michael Wild	4–1	(England) James Silverwood
(England) Jordan Rimmer	0–4	(Wales) Daniel Wells
(Scotland) Marc Davis	w/o–w/d	(Denmark) Ejler Hame
(England) James Cahill	0–4	(England) Ashik Nathwani
(Australia) Jamie Brown	0–4	(England) Stuart Carrington

=== Main rounds ===
==== Top half ====
===== Section 1 =====
Last 128; Best of 7 frames
(England) Ronnie O'Sullivan	4
(Wales) Andrew Pagett	1
(Wales) Dominic Dale	4
(England) David Bailey	0
(England) Mark Selby	4
(England) David Grace	2
(Wales) Ryan Day	3
(England) Michael Wasley	4
(Wales) Matthew Stevens	4
(England) Chris Norbury	1
(Northern Ireland) Joe Swail	4
(England) James Hill	1
(Brazil) Igor Figueiredo	4
(England) Lee Farebrother	1
(England) Jimmy Michie	4
(England) Paul Metcalf	1

Last 64; Best of 7 frames
(England) Ronnie O'Sullivan	4
(Wales) Dominic Dale	0
(England) Mark Selby	4
(England) Michael Wasley	1
(Wales) Matthew Stevens	4
(Northern Ireland) Joe Swail	2
(Brazil) Igor Figueiredo	4
(England) Jimmy Michie	3

Last 32; Best of 7 frames
(England) Ronnie O'Sullivan	4
(England) Mark Selby	3
(Wales) Matthew Stevens	4
(Brazil) Igor Figueiredo	2

Last 16; Best of 7 frames
(England) Ronnie O'Sullivan	4
(Wales) Matthew Stevens	1

===== Section 2 =====
Last 128; Best of 7 frames
(England) Peter Lines	4
(England) Danny Douane	0
(England) Ben Woollaston	4
(England) Adam Duffy	2
(Wales) Jamie Jones	4
(England) James McGouran	2
(Northern Ireland) Gerard Greene	4
(England) Sam Baird	2
(England) Jimmy White	4
(England) Gareth Green	1
(England) Kyren Wilson	4
(Scotland) James McBain	2
(England) Jamie O'Neill	1
(England) Ben Harrison	4
(England) Jamie Cope	4
(England) Samuel Thistlewhite	1

Last 64; Best of 7 frames
(England) Peter Lines	3
(England) Ben Woollaston	4
(Wales) Jamie Jones	4
(Northern Ireland) Gerard Greene	3
(England) Jimmy White	4
(England) Kyren Wilson	3
(England) Ben Harrison	3
(England) Jamie Cope	4

Last 32; Best of 7 frames
(England) Ben Woollaston	3
(Wales) Jamie Jones	4
(England) Jimmy White	1
(England) Jamie Cope	4

Last 16; Best of 7 frames
(Wales) Jamie Jones	2
(England) Jamie Cope	4

===== Section 3 =====
Last 128; Best of 7 frames
(China) Zhang Anda	0
(England) Alfie Burden	4
(Malta) Tony Drago	4
(England) Ian Glover	3
(Scotland) Marcus Campbell	4
(Pakistan) Shokat Ali	2
(England) Peter Ebdon	4
(Poland) Krzysztof Wróbel	0
(England) Jack Lisowski	3
(China) Liu Chuang	4
(England) Barry Pinches	4
(England) Adam Wicheard	3
(Scotland) Alan McManus	4
(England) Ian Burns	2
(Scotland) Anthony McGill	4
(Poland) Marcin Nitschke	1

Last 64; Best of 7 frames
(England) Alfie Burden	4
(Malta) Tony Drago	1
(Scotland) Marcus Campbell	4
(England) Peter Ebdon	1
(China) Liu Chuang	3
(England) Barry Pinches	4
(Scotland) Alan McManus	2
(Scotland) Anthony McGill	4

Last 32; Best of 7 frames
(England) Alfie Burden	2
(Scotland) Marcus Campbell	4
(England) Barry Pinches	4
(Scotland) Anthony McGill	2

Last 16; Best of 7 frames
(Scotland) Marcus Campbell	2
(England) Barry Pinches	4

===== Section 4 =====
Last 128; Best of 7 frames
(England) Liam Highfield	4
(England) Zak Surety	3
(England) Judd Trump	4
(Wales) Jak Jones	1
(England) Paul Davison	4
(Germany) Patrick Einsle	0
(England) Robert Milkins	3
(China) Liu Song	4
(England) Jimmy Robertson	2
(China) Xiao Guodong	4
(England) Matthew Selt	4
(England) Craig Barber	3
(Wales) Mark Williams	4
(England) Marc Harman	0
(England) Mark Joyce	4
(England) Robbie Williams	3

Last 64; Best of 7 frames
(England) Liam Highfield	2
(England) Judd Trump	4
(England) Paul Davison	4
(China) Liu Song	3
(China) Xiao Guodong	4
(England) Matthew Selt	2
(Wales) Mark Williams	4
(England) Mark Joyce	2

Last 32; Best of 7 frames
(England) Judd Trump	4
(England) Paul Davison	2
(China) Xiao Guodong	2
(Wales) Mark Williams	4

Last 16; Best of 7 frames
(England) Judd Trump	0
(Wales) Mark Williams	4

==== Bottom half ====
===== Section 5 =====
Last 128; Best of 7 frames
(England) Shaun Murphy	3
(England) Mitchell Mann	4
(England) Andrew Higginson	4
(Qatar) Ahmed Saif	0
(England) Stephen Lee	4
(England) Lee Spick	1
(England) Rory McLeod	4
(Belgium) Olivier Vandedoheede	1
(Hong Kong) Marco Fu	4
(Belgium) Luca Brecel	0
(England) Andy Hicks	4
(England) Kuldesh Johal	3
(England) Ian McCulloch	1
(England) Allan Taylor	4
(Scotland) Graeme Dott	4
(Poland) Adam Stefanow	0

Last 64; Best of 7 frames
(England) Mitchell Mann	3
(England) Andrew Higginson	4
(England) Stephen Lee	4
(England) Rory McLeod	0
(Hong Kong) Marco Fu	4
(England) Andy Hicks	2
(England) Allan Taylor	4
(Scotland) Graeme Dott	2

Last 32; Best of 7 frames
(England) Andrew Higginson	2
(England) Stephen Lee	4
(Hong Kong) Marco Fu	4
(England) Allan Taylor	1

Last 16; Best of 7 frames
(England) Stephen Lee	2
(Hong Kong) Marco Fu	4

===== Section 6 =====
Last 128; Best of 7 frames
(England) Nigel Bond	4
(England) Gavin Butler	0
(Scotland) Jamie Burnett	4
(Wales) Jamie Clarke	2
(England) Martin Gould	4
(England) Greg Davis	0
(England) Mike Dunn	4
(India) Aditya Mehta	2
(England) Adrian Gunnell	4
(England) Sam Craigie	1
(England) Mark King	4
(England) Stephen Ormerod	2
(England) Joe Jogia	4
(England) David Craggs	1
(Northern Ireland) Patrick Wallace	4
(England) Stephen Craigie	2

Last 64; Best of 7 frames
(England) Nigel Bond	4
(Scotland) Jamie Burnett	0
(England) Martin Gould	4
(England) Mike Dunn	2
(England) Adrian Gunnell	1
(England) Mark King	4
(England) Joe Jogia	4
(Northern Ireland) Patrick Wallace	3

Last 32; Best of 7 frames
(England) Nigel Bond	4
(England) Martin Gould	1
(England) Mark King	1
(England) Joe Jogia	4

Last 16; Best of 7 frames
(England) Nigel Bond	1
(England) Joe Jogia	4

===== Section 7 =====
Last 128; Best of 7 frames
(England) Justin Astley	4
(England) Kamran Ashraf	0
(England) Matthew Couch	4
(Pakistan) Sharrukh Nasir	2
(England) Anthony Hamilton	1
(Northern Ireland) Jordan Brown	4
(England) Mark Davis	4
(Republic of Ireland) Robert Redmond	3
(England) Stuart Bingham	4
(England) Shaun Parkes	0
(England) David Gilbert	2
(England) Nick Jennings	4
(England) Simon Bedford	2
(England) Andrew Norman	4
(England) Tom Ford	4
(England) Martin O'Donnell	0

Last 64; Best of 7 frames
(England) Justin Astley	3
(England) Matthew Couch	4
(Northern Ireland) Jordan Brown	1
(England) Mark Davis	4
(England) Stuart Bingham	4
(England) Nick Jennings	1
(England) Andrew Norman	3
(England) Tom Ford	4

Last 32; Best of 7 frames
(England) Matthew Couch	3
(England) Mark Davis	4
(England) Stuart Bingham	3
(England) Tom Ford	4

Last 16; Best of 7 frames
(England) Mark Davis	3
(England) Tom Ford	4

===== Section 8 =====
Last 128; Best of 7 frames
(Norway) Kurt Maflin	4
(Poland) Michał Zieliński	0
(England) Barry Hawkins	4
(Scotland) Hugh Abernethy	3
(England) Ricky Walden	4
(Hong Kong) Andy Lee	3
(England) Dave Harold	4
(England) Michael Wild	3
(England) Michael Holt	2
(Wales) Daniel Wells	4
(Republic of Ireland) Fergal O'Brien	4
(Scotland) Marc Davis	0
(Belgium) Bjorn Haneveer	4
(England) Ashik Nathwani	2
(Scotland) Stephen Maguire	4
(England) Stuart Carrington	2

Last 64; Best of 7 frames
(Norway) Kurt Maflin	2
(England) Barry Hawkins	4
(England) Ricky Walden	0
(England) Dave Harold	4
(Wales) Daniel Wells	4
(Republic of Ireland) Fergal O'Brien	2
(Belgium) Bjorn Haneveer	0
(Scotland) Stephen Maguire	4

Last 32; Best of 7 frames
(England) Barry Hawkins	4
(England) Dave Harold	2
(Wales) Daniel Wells	1
(Scotland) Stephen Maguire	4

Last 16; Best of 7 frames
(England) Barry Hawkins	3
(Scotland) Stephen Maguire	4

==== Finals ====
Quarter-finals; Best of 7 frames		Semi-finals; Best of 7 frames		Final; Best of 7 frames
(England) Ronnie O'Sullivan	0
(England) Jamie Cope	4	(England) Jamie Cope	3
(England) Barry Pinches	3	(Wales) Mark Williams	4
(Wales) Mark Williams	4			(Wales) Mark Williams	4
(Hong Kong) Marco Fu	4			(Scotland) Stephen Maguire	0
(England) Joe Jogia	2	(Hong Kong) Marco Fu	1
(England) Tom Ford	2	(Scotland) Stephen Maguire	4
(Scotland) Stephen Maguire	4

== Final ==
Final: Best of 7 frames. World Snooker Academy, Sheffield, England, 27 June 2010.
Mark Williams; Wales	4–0	Stephen Maguire; Scotland
75–0 (75), 69–0 (64), 67–54 (59), 106–16 (82)
82	Highest break	–
0	Century breaks	0
4	50+ breaks	0

== Century breaks ==
- 147 – Kurt Maflin
- 141, 129 – Mark Selby
- 138, 118 – Tony Drago
- 137, 129, 124, 124, 114 – Stephen Maguire
- 136 – Jordan Brown
- 136 – Dave Harold
- 134, 130 – Anthony McGill
- 134 – Jamie Jones
- 133 – Joe Jogia
- 129, 108 – Andrew Higginson
- 129, 103 – Tom Ford
- 124 – Fergal O'Brien
- 122 – Ronnie O'Sullivan
- 121 – Andrew Norman
- 119 – Marco Fu
- 117 – Alan McManus
- 115 – Patrick Wallace
- 114 – Michał Zieliński
- 112, 102, 100, 100 – Jamie Cope
- 111 – Judd Trump
- 110, 100 – Hugh Abernethy
- 109, 109 – Stephen Lee
- 107 – Daniel Wells
- 106 – Stuart Bingham
- 106 – Jimmy Robertson
- 104 – Nick Jennings
- 104 – Peter Ebdon
- 103 – Jamie Burnett
- 101 – Rory McLeod
- 101 – Mike Dunn
- 101 – Alfie Burden
