= Euro Players Tour Championship 2010/2011 – Event 6 =

Euro Players Tour Championship 2010/2011 Event 6

Tournament information
- Dates: 19–21 November 2010
- Venue: Aréna Sparta Podvinný Mlýn
- City: Prague
- Country: Czech Republic
- Organisation: World Snooker
- Format: Minor-ranking event
- Total prize fund: €50,000
- Winner's share: €10,000
- Highest break: Rory McLeod (ENG) (147)

Final
- Champion: Michael Holt (ENG)
- Runner-up: John Higgins (SCO)
- Score: 4–3

The Euro Players Tour Championship 2010/2011 – Event 6 (also known as the 2010 Prague Classic) was a professional minor-ranking snooker tournament that took place between 19–21 November 2010 at the Aréna Sparta Podvinný Mlýn in Prague, Czech Republic.

Rory McLeod made the 76th official maximum break during his last 32 match against Issara Kachaiwong. This was McLeod's first 147 break.

Michael Holt won the final 4–3 against John Higgins.

== Prize fund and ranking points ==
The breakdown of prize money and ranking points of the event is shown below:

	Prize fund	Ranking points^{1}
Winner	€10,000	2,000
Runner-up	€5,000	1,600
Semi-finalist	€2,500	1,280
Quarter-finalist	€1,400	1,000
Last 16	€1,000	760
Last 32	€500	560
Last 64	€200	360
Plate winner^{2}	€1,500	–
Plate runner-up^{2}	€500	–
Total	€50,000	–

- ^{1} Only professional players can earn ranking points.
- ^{2} Prize money earned from the Plate competition does not qualify for inclusion in the Order of Merit.

== Main draw ==
=== Top half ===
==== Section 1 ====
Last 128; Best of 7 frames
(Belgium) Bjorn Haneveer	4
(England) Matt Yeadon	0
(Wales) Dominic Dale	4
(Wales) Jak Jones	1
(England) Martin Gould	w/o
(Republic of Ireland) David Morris	w/d
(England) Jimmy Robertson	4
(England) Jimmy Michie	2
(Australia) Neil Robertson	4
(England) Reanne Evans	3
(England) Ricky Walden	4
(Netherlands) Maurice Le Duc	0
(England) Dave Harold	4
(Germany) Lasse Münstermann	2

Last 64; Best of 7 frames
(England) Mark Selby	4
(Belgium) Bjorn Haneveer	1
(Wales) Dominic Dale	4
(England) Martin Gould	0
(England) Jimmy Robertson	4
(Australia) Neil Robertson	2
(England) Ricky Walden	4
(England) Dave Harold	2

Last 32; Best of 7 frames
(England) Mark Selby	4
(Wales) Dominic Dale	2
(England) Jimmy Robertson	0
(England) Ricky Walden	4

Last 16; Best of 7 frames
(England) Mark Selby	4
(England) Ricky Walden	3

==== Section 2 ====
Last 128; Best of 7 frames
(China) Liu Song	w/o
(England) Danny Douane	w/d
(England) Jamie Cope	4
(England) Alex O'Donoghue	2
(Brazil) Igor Figueiredo	4
(Czech Republic) Simon Ceo	0
(England) Ian McCulloch	w/d
(China) Zhang Anda	w/o
(Scotland) Stephen Maguire	4
(China) Chen Zhe	1
(Malta) Tony Drago	w/o
(England) Jamie O'Neill	w/d
(Wales) Jamie Jones	1
(Northern Ireland) Joe Swail	4
(England) Liam Highfield	3
(England) Michael Holt	4

Last 64; Best of 7 frames
(China) Liu Song	3
(England) Jamie Cope	4
(Brazil) Igor Figueiredo	2
(China) Zhang Anda	4
(Scotland) Stephen Maguire	4
(Malta) Tony Drago	1
(Northern Ireland) Joe Swail	2
(England) Michael Holt	4

Last 32; Best of 7 frames
(England) Jamie Cope	4
(China) Zhang Anda	1
(Scotland) Stephen Maguire	2
(England) Michael Holt	4

Last 16; Best of 7 frames
(England) Jamie Cope	2
(England) Michael Holt	4

==== Section 3 ====
Last 128; Best of 7 frames
(England) Rory McLeod	4
(Scotland) Jamie Burnett	3
(England) Ali Carter	w/d
(Netherlands) Mario Wehrmann	w/o
(England) Andrew Higginson	4
(Belgium) Tomasz Skalski	0
(England) Anthony Hamilton	w/d
(Thailand) Issara Kachaiwong	w/o
(England) Nigel Bond	4
(Czech Republic) Jaromir Malanta	0
(England) Peter Ebdon	4
(England) Andrew Norman	0
(Northern Ireland) Gerard Greene	4
(Germany) Michael Heeger	0
(England) Peter Lines	4
(England) Oliver Brown	0

Last 64; Best of 7 frames
(England) Rory McLeod	4
(Netherlands) Mario Wehrmann	2
(England) Andrew Higginson	3
(Thailand) Issara Kachaiwong	4
(England) Nigel Bond	2
(England) Peter Ebdon	4
(Northern Ireland) Gerard Greene	2
(England) Peter Lines	4

Last 32; Best of 7 frames
(England) Rory McLeod	3
(Thailand) Issara Kachaiwong	4
(England) Peter Ebdon	4
(England) Peter Lines	0

Last 16; Best of 7 frames
(Thailand) Issara Kachaiwong	3
(England) Peter Ebdon	4

==== Section 4 ====
Last 128; Best of 7 frames
(England) Ronnie O'Sullivan	w/d
(Czech Republic) Jakub Rendla	w/o
(Scotland) Anthony McGill	4
(Germany) Stefan Schenk	0
(England) Shaun Murphy	4
(Denmark) Rune Kampe	1
(England) Alfie Burden	4
(Czech Republic) Jan Prihoda	0
(Republic of Ireland) Ken Doherty	4
(Germany) Robert Drahn	0
(China) Xiao Guodong	4
(Thailand) Thanawat Thirapongpaiboon	3
(England) Stephen Lee	4
(Czech Republic) Tomas Kejla	0
(England) Judd Trump	2
(England) Adam Wicheard	4

Last 64; Best of 7 frames
(Czech Republic) Jakub Rendla	0
(Scotland) Anthony McGill	4
(England) Shaun Murphy	4
(England) Alfie Burden	1
(Republic of Ireland) Ken Doherty	4
(China) Xiao Guodong	3
(England) Stephen Lee	4
(England) Adam Wicheard	3

Last 32; Best of 7 frames
(Scotland) Anthony McGill	1
(England) Shaun Murphy	4
(Republic of Ireland) Ken Doherty	4
(England) Stephen Lee	0

Last 16; Best of 7 frames
(England) Shaun Murphy	4
(Republic of Ireland) Ken Doherty	2

=== Bottom half ===
==== Section 5 ====
Last 128; Best of 7 frames
(Scotland) Alan McManus	w/o
(England) Kuldesh Johal	w/d
(Scotland) Marcus Campbell	4
(Czech Republic) Lukáš Křenek	0
(England) Allan Taylor	w/o
(England) Andy Lee	w/d
(Wales) Michael White	4
(Germany) Patrick Einsle	1
(England) Paul Davison	2
(England) Ian Glover	4
(England) Joe Jogia	4
(England) Tony Knowles	1
(Wales) Daniel Wells	3
(England) Justin Astley	4
(England) Matthew Couch	2
(England) Rod Lawler	4

Last 64; Best of 7 frames
(Scotland) Alan McManus	3
(Scotland) Marcus Campbell	4
(England) Allan Taylor	2
(Wales) Michael White	4
(England) Ian Glover	1
(England) Joe Jogia	4
(England) Justin Astley	4
(England) Rod Lawler	3

Last 32; Best of 7 frames
(Scotland) Marcus Campbell	2
(Wales) Michael White	4
(England) Joe Jogia	4
(England) Justin Astley	0

Last 16; Best of 7 frames
(Wales) Michael White	3
(England) Joe Jogia	4

==== Section 6 ====
Last 128; Best of 7 frames
(Scotland) Graeme Dott	4
(Belgium) Kevin Van Hove	1
(England) Jack Lisowski	4
(England) Sam Harvey	3
(England) Jimmy White	4
(England) Damian Wilks	2
(Wales) Matthew Stevens	4
(Czech Republic) Jindrich Prchal	0
(England) Kyren Wilson	4
(Czech Republic) Jan Klecka	0
(England) Barry Hawkins	4
(India) David Singh	0
(China) Liu Chuang	w/o
(New Zealand) Chris McBreen	w/d
(England) Joe Perry	4
(Thailand) Noppon Saengkham	0

Last 64; Best of 7 frames
(Scotland) Graeme Dott	3
(England) Jack Lisowski	4
(England) Jimmy White	2
(Wales) Matthew Stevens	4
(England) Kyren Wilson	0
(England) Barry Hawkins	4
(China) Liu Chuang	4
(England) Joe Perry	2

Last 32; Best of 7 frames
(England) Jack Lisowski	3
(Wales) Matthew Stevens	4
(England) Barry Hawkins	4
(China) Liu Chuang	3

Last 16; Best of 7 frames
(Wales) Matthew Stevens	4
(England) Barry Hawkins	0

==== Section 7 ====
Last 128; Best of 7 frames
(England) Stuart Bingham	4
(Germany) Jürgen Kesseler	1
(England) Matthew Selt	4
(Norway) Kurt Maflin	2
(England) Robert Milkins	4
(Germany) Ronni Beniesch	0
(Wales) Andrew Pagett	w/o
(Scotland) Stephen Hendry	w/d
(England) Mark Joyce	4
(Germany) Dieter Meier	0
(England) Ben Woollaston	4
(Czech Republic) Jan Wimr	0
(England) Mike Dunn	4
(Serbia) Marko Vukovic	0
(England) Mark King	2
(Wales) Ryan Day	4

Last 64; Best of 7 frames
(England) Stuart Bingham	4
(England) Matthew Selt	1
(England) Robert Milkins	0
(Wales) Andrew Pagett	4
(England) Mark Joyce	1
(England) Ben Woollaston	4
(England) Mike Dunn	3
(Wales) Ryan Day	4

Last 32; Best of 7 frames
(England) Stuart Bingham	4
(Wales) Andrew Pagett	1
(England) Ben Woollaston	2
(Wales) Ryan Day	4

Last 16; Best of 7 frames
(England) Stuart Bingham	4
(Wales) Ryan Day	1

==== Section 8 ====
Last 128; Best of 7 frames
(England) Michael Wasley	4
(Belgium) Hans Blanckaert	3
(England) Andy Hicks	4
(Czech Republic) Karel Petracek	0
(England) Steve Davis	4
(Slovakia) Jakub Koniar	0
(Northern Ireland) Mark Allen	4
(Czech Republic) Serge Dupraz	0
(England) Mark Davis	4
(England) Jamie Walker	2
(England) Adrian Gunnell	4
(Germany) Thomas Cesal	0
(England) Tom Ford	1
(Scotland) John Higgins	4
(England) Barry Pinches	4
(England) Martin O'Donnell	1

Last 64; Best of 7 frames
(England) Michael Wasley	2
(England) Andy Hicks	4
(England) Steve Davis	3
(Northern Ireland) Mark Allen	4
(England) Mark Davis	3
(England) Adrian Gunnell	4
(Scotland) John Higgins	4
(England) Barry Pinches	3

Last 32; Best of 7 frames
(England) Andy Hicks	1
(Northern Ireland) Mark Allen	4
(England) Adrian Gunnell	1
(Scotland) John Higgins	4

Last 16; Best of 7 frames
(Northern Ireland) Mark Allen	1
(Scotland) John Higgins	4

=== Finals ===
Quarter-finals; Best of 7 frames		Semi-finals; Best of 7 frames		Final; Best of 7 frames
(England) Mark Selby	2
(England) Michael Holt	4	(England) Michael Holt	4
(England) Peter Ebdon	2	(England) Shaun Murphy	3
(England) Shaun Murphy	4			(England) Michael Holt	4
(England) Joe Jogia	4			(Scotland) John Higgins	3
(Wales) Matthew Stevens	2	(England) Joe Jogia	2
(England) Stuart Bingham	1	(Scotland) John Higgins	4
(Scotland) John Higgins	4

== Century breaks ==
- 147 – Rory McLeod
- 136, 117, 106 – Ryan Day
- 135, 116 – Joe Perry
- 132, 120, 100 – Mark Allen
- 132 – Joe Jogia
- 132 – Mark Selby
- 127, 107 – Anthony McGill
- 123 – Liam Highfield
- 122 – Adrian Gunnell
- 121 – Peter Ebdon
- 121 – Barry Pinches
- 120 – Matthew Stevens
- 119, 104 – Jack Lisowski
- 117, 105 – Graeme Dott
- 117 – Mark Davis
- 115, 111 – Jimmy Robertson
- 114, 109 – Ricky Walden
- 113, 102 – Shaun Murphy
- 113 – Gerard Greene
- 112, 104, 102, 101, 100 – John Higgins
- 111, 108 – Stuart Bingham
- 110, 101 – Andy Hicks
- 109 – Jamie Burnett
- 108, 101 – Michael Holt
- 105 – Dominic Dale
- 105 – Robert Milkins
- 104 – Daniel Wells
- 103 – Michael White
- 102 – Judd Trump
- 102 – Stephen Maguire
- 102 – Ken Doherty
- 100 – Liu Chuang
