= List of minor-ranking snooker tournaments =

This is a chronological list of snooker minor-ranking tournaments. Ranking tournaments are those that are used for the official system of ranking professional snooker players which is used to determine automatic qualification and seeding for tournaments on the World Snooker Tour. However, in 1992/93 and from 2010/11 to the 2015/16 season there were a number of tournaments which contributed to the world rankings but at a lower rate than standard ranking tournaments. These tournaments are referred to as "minor-ranking tournaments". All the minor-ranking tournaments from 2010 to 2016 were part of the Players Tour Championship. These events are the events included in the list below.

== Winners ==
Mark Selby had the most wins, 7, in minor-rankings events. Mark Allen was second with 5 wins.

== Tournaments ==
MR	Date	Tournament	Location	Winner	Sc	Runner-up	Ref.
M1	5 Nov 1992	1992 Benson & Hedges Championship	Glasgow	Chris Small (SCO) (1)	9‍–‍1	Alan McManus (SCO) (1)	
M2	21 Dec 1992	Strachan Challenge 1992/1993 – Event 1	Aldershot	Joe Swail (NIR) (1)	9‍–‍4	Stefan Mazrocis (ENG) (1)	
M3	12 Jan 1993	Strachan Challenge 1992/1993 – Event 2	Sheffield	Troy Shaw (ENG) (1)	9‍–‍4	Nigel Bond (ENG) (1)	
M4	6 Feb 1993	Strachan Challenge 1992/1993 – Event 3	Aldershot	Tony Drago (MLT) (1)	9‍–‍7	Ken Doherty (IRL) (1)	
M5	27 Jun 2010	Players Tour Championship 2010/2011 – Event 1	Sheffield	Mark Williams (WAL) (1)	4‍–‍0	Stephen Maguire (SCO) (1)	
M6	11 Jul 2010	Players Tour Championship 2010/2011 – Event 2	Sheffield	Mark Selby (ENG) (1)	4‍–‍3	Barry Pinches (ENG) (1)	
M7	8 Aug 2010	Players Tour Championship 2010/2011 – Event 3	Sheffield	Tom Ford (ENG) (1)	4‍–‍0	Jack Lisowski (ENG) (1)	
M8	16 Aug 2010	Players Tour Championship 2010/2011 – Event 4	Sheffield	Barry Pinches (ENG) (1)	4‍–‍3	Ronnie O'Sullivan (ENG) (1)	
M9	29 Aug 2010	Euro Players Tour Championship 2010/2011 – Event 1	Fürth	Judd Trump (ENG) (1)	4‍–‍3	Anthony Hamilton (ENG) (1)	
M10	3 Oct 2010	Euro Players Tour Championship 2010/2011 – Event 2	Bruges	Shaun Murphy (ENG) (1)	4‍–‍2	Matthew Couch (ENG) (1)	
M11	10 Oct 2010	Players Tour Championship 2010/2011 – Event 5	Sheffield	Ding Junhui (CHN) (1)	4‍–‍1	Jamie Jones (WAL) (1)	
M12	17 Oct 2010	Players Tour Championship 2010/2011 – Event 6	Sheffield	Dominic Dale (WAL) (1)	4‍–‍3	Martin Gould (ENG) (1)	
M13	24 Oct 2010	Euro Players Tour Championship 2010/2011 – Event 3	Rüsselsheim	Marcus Campbell (SCO) (1)	4‍–‍0	Liang Wenbo (CHN) (1)	
M14	31 Oct 2010	Euro Players Tour Championship 2010/2011 – Event 4	Gloucester	Stephen Lee (ENG) (1)	4‍–‍2	Stephen Maguire (SCO) (2)	
M15	14 Nov 2010	Euro Players Tour Championship 2010/2011 – Event 5	Hamm	John Higgins (SCO) (1)	4‍–‍2	Shaun Murphy (ENG) (1)	
M16	21 Nov 2010	Euro Players Tour Championship 2010/2011 – Event 6	Prague	Michael Holt (ENG) (1)	4‍–‍3	John Higgins (SCO) (1)	
M17	22 Jun 2011	Players Tour Championship 2011/2012 – Event 1	Sheffield	Ronnie O'Sullivan (ENG) (1)	4‍–‍0	Joe Perry (ENG) (1)	
M18	10 Aug 2011	Players Tour Championship 2011/2012 – Event 2	Gloucester	Judd Trump (ENG) (2)	4‍–‍0	Ding Junhui (CHN) (1)	
M19	21 Aug 2011	Players Tour Championship 2011/2012 – Event 3	Sheffield	Ben Woollaston (ENG) (1)	4‍–‍2	Graeme Dott (SCO) (1)	
M20	28 Aug 2011	Players Tour Championship 2011/2012 – Event 4	Fürth	Mark Selby (ENG) (2)	4‍–‍0	Mark Davis (ENG) (1)	
M21	25 Sep 2011	Players Tour Championship 2011/2012 – Event 5	Sheffield	Andrew Higginson (ENG) (1)	4‍–‍1	John Higgins (SCO) (2)	
M22	2 Oct 2011	Players Tour Championship 2011/2012 – Event 6	Warsaw	Neil Robertson (AUS) (1)	4‍–‍1	Ricky Walden (ENG) (1)	
M23	9 Oct 2011	Players Tour Championship 2011/2012 – Event 7	Gloucester	Ronnie O'Sullivan (ENG) (2)	4‍–‍2	Matthew Stevens (WAL) (1)	
M24	23 Oct 2011	Players Tour Championship 2011/2012 – Event 8	Killarney	Neil Robertson (AUS) (2)	4‍–‍1	Judd Trump (ENG) (1)	
M25	13 Nov 2011	Players Tour Championship 2011/2012 – Event 9	Antwerp	Judd Trump (ENG) (3)	4‍–‍3	Ronnie O'Sullivan (ENG) (2)	
M26	30 Nov 2011	Players Tour Championship 2011/2012 – Event 10	Sheffield	Michael Holt (ENG) (2)	4‍–‍2	Dominic Dale (WAL) (1)	
M27	19 Dec 2011	Players Tour Championship 2011/2012 – Event 11	Sheffield	Tom Ford (ENG) (2)	4‍–‍3	Martin Gould (ENG) (2)	
M28	8 Jan 2012	Players Tour Championship 2011/2012 – Event 12	Fürstenfeldbruck	Stephen Maguire (SCO) (1)	4‍–‍2	Joe Perry (ENG) (2)	
M29	22 Jun 2012	Asian Players Tour Championship 2012/2013 – Event 1	Zhangjiagang	Stuart Bingham (ENG) (1)	4‍–‍3	Stephen Lee (ENG) (1)	
M30	22 Jul 2012	Players Tour Championship 2012/2013 – Event 1	Gloucester	Stephen Maguire (SCO) (2)	4‍–‍3	Jack Lisowski (ENG) (2)	
M31	12 Aug 2012	Players Tour Championship 2012/2013 – Event 2	Gloucester	Martin Gould (ENG) (1)	4‍–‍3	Stephen Maguire (SCO) (3)	
M32	26 Aug 2012	European Tour 2012/2013 – Event 1	Fürth	Mark Selby (ENG) (3)	4‍–‍1	Joe Swail (NIR) (1)	
M33	9 Sep 2012	Players Tour Championship 2012/2013 – Event 3	Gloucester	Rod Lawler (ENG) (1)	4‍–‍2	Marco Fu (HKG) (1)	
M34	27 Sep 2012	Asian Players Tour Championship 2012/2013 – Event 2	Yixing	Stephen Lee (ENG) (2)	4‍–‍0	Ding Junhui (CHN) (2)	
M35	7 Oct 2012	European Tour 2012/2013 – Event 2	Gdynia	Neil Robertson (AUS) (3)	4‍–‍3	Jamie Burnett (SCO) (1)	
M36	21 Oct 2012	European Tour 2012/2013 – Event 3	Antwerp	Mark Allen (NIR) (1)	4‍–‍1	Mark Selby (ENG) (1)	
M37	9 Nov 2012	Asian Players Tour Championship 2012/2013 – Event 3	Zhengzhou	Stuart Bingham (ENG) (2)	4‍–‍3	Li Hang (CHN) (1)	
M38	14 Nov 2012	Players Tour Championship 2012/2013 – Event 4	Gloucester	John Higgins (SCO) (2)	4‍–‍2	Judd Trump (ENG) (2)	
M39	18 Nov 2012	European Tour 2012/2013 – Event 4	Sofia	Judd Trump (ENG) (4)	4‍–‍0	John Higgins (SCO) (3)	
M40	16 Dec 2012	European Tour 2012/2013 – Event 5	Ravenscraig	Ding Junhui (CHN) (2)	4‍–‍2	Anthony McGill (SCO) (1)	
M41	6 Jan 2013	European Tour 2012/2013 – Event 6	Fürstenfeldbruck	Mark Selby (ENG) (4)	4‍–‍3	Graeme Dott (SCO) (2)	
M42	9 Jun 2013	European Tour 2013/2014 – Event 1	Sofia	John Higgins (SCO) (3)	4‍–‍1	Neil Robertson (AUS) (1)	
M43	15 Jun 2013	Asian Tour 2013/2014 – Event 1	Yixing	Joe Perry (ENG) (1)	4‍–‍1	Mark Selby (ENG) (2)	
M44	21 Jul 2013	European Tour 2013/2014 – Event 2	Rotterdam	Mark Williams (WAL) (2)	4‍–‍3	Mark Selby (ENG) (3)	
M45	17 Aug 2013	European Tour 2013/2014 – Event 3	Doncaster	Ricky Walden (ENG) (1)	4‍–‍3	Marco Fu (HKG) (2)	
M46	25 Aug 2013	European Tour 2013/2014 – Event 4	Fürth	Ronnie O'Sullivan (ENG) (3)	4‍–‍0	Gerard Greene (NIR) (1)	
M47	27 Sep 2013	Asian Tour 2013/2014 – Event 2	Zhangjiagang	Ju Reti (CHN) (1)	4‍–‍1	Michael Holt (ENG) (1)	
M48	6 Oct 2013	European Tour 2013/2014 – Event 5	Mülheim	Mark Allen (NIR) (2)	4‍–‍1	Ding Junhui (CHN) (3)	
M49	24 Oct 2013	Asian Tour 2013/2014 – Event 3	Zhengzhou	Liang Wenbo (CHN) (1)	4‍–‍0	Lyu Haotian (CHN) (1)	
M50	10 Nov 2013	European Tour 2013/2014 – Event 6	Gloucester	Mark Allen (NIR) (3)	4‍–‍1	Judd Trump (ENG) (3)	
M51	17 Nov 2013	European Tour 2013/2014 – Event 7	Antwerp	Mark Selby (ENG) (5)	4‍–‍3	Ronnie O'Sullivan (ENG) (3)	
M52	9 Feb 2014	European Tour 2013/2014 – Event 8	Gdynia	Shaun Murphy (ENG) (2)	4‍–‍1	Fergal O'Brien (IRL) (1)	
M53	8 Mar 2014	Asian Tour 2013/2014 – Event 4	Dongguan	Stuart Bingham (ENG) (3)	4‍–‍1	Liang Wenbo (CHN) (2)	
M54	21 Jun 2014	Asian Tour 2014/2015 – Event 1	Yixing	Ding Junhui (CHN) (3)	4‍–‍2	Michael Holt (ENG) (2)	
M55	10 Aug 2014	European Tour 2014/2015 – Event 1	Riga	Mark Selby (ENG) (6)	4‍–‍3	Mark Allen (NIR) (1)	
M56	24 Aug 2014	European Tour 2014/2015 – Event 2	Fürth	Mark Allen (NIR) (4)	4‍–‍2	Judd Trump (ENG) (4)	
M57	5 Oct 2014	European Tour 2014/2015 – Event 3	Sofia	Shaun Murphy (ENG) (3)	4‍–‍2	Martin Gould (ENG) (3)	
M58	24 Oct 2014	Asian Tour 2014/2015 – Event 2	Haining	Stuart Bingham (ENG) (4)	4‍–‍0	Oliver Lines (ENG) (1)	
M59	23 Nov 2014	European Tour 2014/2015 – Event 4	Mülheim	Shaun Murphy (ENG) (4)	4‍–‍0	Robert Milkins (ENG) (1)	
M60	14 Dec 2014	European Tour 2014/2015 – Event 5	Lisbon	Stephen Maguire (SCO) (3)	4‍–‍2	Matthew Selt (ENG) (1)	
M61	24 Jan 2015	Asian Tour 2014/2015 – Event 3	Xuzhou	Joe Perry (ENG) (2)	4‍–‍1	Thepchaiya Un-Nooh (THA) (1)	
M62	1 Mar 2015	European Tour 2014/2015 – Event 6	Gdynia	Neil Robertson (AUS) (4)	4‍–‍0	Mark Williams (WAL) (1)	
M63	2 Aug 2015	European Tour 2015/2016 – Event 1	Riga	Barry Hawkins (ENG) (1)	4‍–‍1	Tom Ford (ENG) (1)	
M64	30 Aug 2015	European Tour 2015/2016 – Event 2	Fürth	Ali Carter (ENG) (1)	4‍–‍3	Shaun Murphy (ENG) (2)	
M65	11 Oct 2015	European Tour 2015/2016 – Event 3	Mülheim	Rory McLeod (ENG) (1)	4‍–‍2	Tian Pengfei (CHN) (1)	
M66	23 Oct 2015	Asian Tour 2015/2016 – Event 1	Haining	Ding Junhui (CHN) (4)	4‍–‍3	Ricky Walden (ENG) (2)	
M67	8 Nov 2015	European Tour 2015/2016 – Event 4	Sofia	Mark Allen (NIR) (5)	4‍–‍0	Ryan Day (WAL) (1)	
M68	13 Dec 2015	European Tour 2015/2016 – Event 5	Gibraltar	Marco Fu (HKG) (1)	4‍–‍1	Michael White (WAL) (1)	
M69	28 Feb 2016	European Tour 2015/2016 – Event 6	Gdynia	Mark Selby (ENG) (7)	4‍–‍1	Martin Gould (ENG) (4)	

Notes:

MR – Minor-ranking event number.
Date – Date of the final day of the tournament.
Numbers in parentheses in the Winner and Runner-up columns refer to the number of times the player had been a winner or runner-up at that time.
Sc – Frame score in the final.
Ref. – Reference.

Many of the Players Tour Championship tournaments had alternative names. For instance the Euro Players Tour Championship 2010/2011 – Event 2 was also called the 2010 Brugge Open. For three events (M28, M35, M41) only the later stages of the event were held at the venue noted, earlier rounds being held in Sheffield.

== See also ==
- List of snooker ranking tournaments
- Snooker world rankings
