= Players Tour Championship 2010/2011 =

European association football tournament

The Players Tour Championship 2010/2011 started on 24 June 2010 and ended on 20 March 2011 with events held in Sheffield and Europe. The televised finals took place between the top 24 Order of Merit players, who have played at least 6 events (3 PTC and 3 EPTC).

== Schedule ==
Date (Note: Dates use the month day format)			Tournament Name	Venue	City	Winner	Runner–up	Score	References
06–24	06–27	ENG	Players Tour Championship – Event 1	World Snooker Academy	Sheffield	(Wales) Mark Williams	(Scotland) Stephen Maguire	4–0	
07–08	07–11	ENG	Players Tour Championship – Event 2	World Snooker Academy	Sheffield	(England) Mark Selby	(England) Barry Pinches	4–3	
08–06	08–08	ENG	Players Tour Championship – Event 3	World Snooker Academy	Sheffield	(England) Tom Ford	(England) Jack Lisowski	4–0	
08–14	08–16	ENG	Players Tour Championship – Event 4	World Snooker Academy	Sheffield	(England) Barry Pinches	(England) Ronnie O'Sullivan	4–3	
08–26	08–29	GER	Euro Players Tour Championship – Event 1 (Note: Event also known as the 2010 Paul Hunter Classic.)	Stadthalle	Fürth	(England) Judd Trump	(England) Anthony Hamilton	4–3	
09–30	10–03	BEL	Euro Players Tour Championship – Event 2 (Note: Event also known as the 2010 Brugge Open.)	Boudewijn Seapark	Bruges	(England) Shaun Murphy	(England) Matthew Couch	4–2	
10–07	10–10	ENG	Players Tour Championship – Event 5	World Snooker Academy	Sheffield	(China) Ding Junhui	(Wales) Jamie Jones	4–1	
10–14	10–17	ENG	Players Tour Championship – Event 6	World Snooker Academy	Sheffield	(Wales) Dominic Dale	(England) Martin Gould	4–3	
10–22	10–24	GER	Euro Players Tour Championship – Event 3 (Note: Event also known as the 2010 Rhein-Main Masters and the 2010 Rüsselsheim Cup.)	Walter Kobel Sporthalle	Rüsselsheim	(Scotland) Marcus Campbell	(China) Liang Wenbo	4–0	
10–28	10–31	ENG	Euro Players Tour Championship – Event 4 (Note: Event also known as the 2010 MIUS Cup.)	South West Snooker Academy	Gloucester	(England) Stephen Lee	(Scotland) Stephen Maguire	4–2	
11–12	11–14	GER	Euro Players Tour Championship – Event 5 (Note: Event also known as the 2010 Ruhr Championship.)	Sparkassen Arena	Hamm	(Scotland) John Higgins	(England) Shaun Murphy	4–2	
11–19	11–21	CZE	Euro Players Tour Championship – Event 6 (Note: Event also known as the 2010 Prague Classic.)	Aréna Sparta Podvinný Mlýn	Prague	(England) Michael Holt	(Scotland) John Higgins	4–3	
03–17	03–20	IRL	Players Tour Championship – Finals (Note: Event also known as the 2011 Players Tour Championship Grand Finals.)	The Helix	Dublin	(England) Shaun Murphy	(England) Martin Gould	4–0	

== Order of Merit ==
Players not eligible for the Finals

Rank	Player	Total Points	Events Played		
Rank	Player	Total Points	PTC	EPTC	Total
1.	(England) Shaun Murphy	23,200	6	6	12
2.	(England) Mark Selby	21,300	6	6	12
3.	(England) Barry Pinches	19,100	6	6	12
4.	(Scotland) Marcus Campbell	17,700	6	6	12
5.	(England) Judd Trump	17,600	6	6	12
6.	(Wales) Mark Williams	17,100	5	4	9
7.	(Wales) Dominic Dale	16,800	6	6	12
8.	(England) Stephen Lee	16,200	6	6	12
9.	(England) Tom Ford	15,000	6	6	12
10.	(Scotland) John Higgins	15,000	0	2	2
11.	(Scotland) Stephen Maguire	14,400	6	4	10
12.	(China) Ding Junhui	11,800	2	3	5
13.	(England) Michael Holt	10,900	6	6	12
14.	(China) Liang Wenbo	10,700	4	4	8
15.	(England) Martin Gould	10,600	6	6	12
16.	(Hong Kong) Marco Fu	10,100	5	4	9
17.	(England) Ricky Walden	10,100	6	6	12
18.	(England) Anthony Hamilton	9,900	6	5	11
19.	(England) Stuart Bingham	9,800	6	6	12
20.	(England) Jack Lisowski	9,600	6	6	12
21.	(Wales) Jamie Jones	9,400	6	6	12
22.	(England) Andrew Higginson	8,700	6	6	12
23.	(England) Mark Davis	8,300	6	6	12
24.	(Wales) Matthew Stevens	8,300	6	6	12
25.	(Northern Ireland) Gerard Greene	7,700	6	6	12
26.	(England) Joe Jogia	7,500	6	5	11

== Finals ==
The Finals of the Players Tour Championship 2010/2011 took place from 17 to 20 March 2011 at The Helix in Dublin, Ireland. It was contested by the top 24 players of the Order of Merit, who have played in at least 6 events (3 PTC and 3 EPTC).

Final: Best of 7 frames The Helix, Dublin, Ireland, 20 March 2011.
Shaun Murphy; England	4–0	Martin Gould; England
70–18, 66–46, 59–44 (53), 51–34
53	Highest break	45
0	Century breaks	0
1	50+ breaks	0
