= 2011 Players Tour Championship Grand Final =

2011 PartyCasino.com Players Tour Championship Grand Final

Tournament information
- Dates: 16–20 March 2011
- Venue: The Helix
- City: Dublin
- Country: Ireland
- Organisation: World Snooker
- Format: Ranking event
- Total prize fund: £200,000
- Winner's share: £60,000
- Highest break: Mark Williams (WAL) (143)

Final
- Champion: Shaun Murphy (ENG)
- Runner-up: Martin Gould (ENG)
- Score: 4–0

The 2011 Players Tour Championship Grand Final (officially the 2011 PartyCasino.com Players Tour Championship Grand Final)) was a professional ranking snooker tournament that took place between 16 and 20 March 2011 at The Helix in Dublin, Ireland. The tournament was broadcast by Eurosport.

Shaun Murphy won his fourth ranking title by defeating Martin Gould 4–0 in the final.

== Prize fund and ranking points ==
The breakdown of prize money and ranking points of the event is shown below:

	Prize fund	Ranking points
Winner	£60,000	3,000
Runner-up	£25,000	2,400
Semi-finalist	£15,000	1,920
Quarter-finalist	£7,500	1,500
Last 16	£4,000	1,140
Last 24	£2,500	840
Highest break	£3,000	–
Total	£200,000	–

== Seeding list ==
The leading 24 players in the PTC Order of Merit qualified for the event, provided that they had played in at least 6 events (3 in the UK and 3 in Europe). John Higgins and Ding Junhui were in the top 24 but failed to play in the minimum number of events.

Rank	Player	Total points
1	Shaun Murphy (ENG)	23,200
2	Mark Selby (ENG)	21,300
3	Barry Pinches (ENG)	19,100
4	Marcus Campbell (SCO)	17,700
5	Judd Trump (ENG)	17,600
6	Mark Williams (WAL)	17,100
7	Dominic Dale (WAL)	16,800
8	Stephen Lee (ENG)	16,200
9	Tom Ford (ENG)	15,000
10	Stephen Maguire (SCO)	14,400
11	Michael Holt (ENG)	10,900
12	Liang Wenbo (CHN)	10,700
13	Martin Gould (ENG)	10,600
14	Marco Fu (HKG)	10,100
15	Ricky Walden (ENG)	10,100
16	Anthony Hamilton (ENG)	9,900
17	Stuart Bingham (ENG)	9,800
18	Jack Lisowski (ENG)	9,600
19	Jamie Jones (WAL)	9,400
20	Andrew Higginson (ENG)	8,700
21	Mark Davis (ENG)	8,300
22	Matthew Stevens (WAL)	8,300
23	Gerard Greene (NIR)	7,700
24	Joe Jogia (ENG)	7,500

== Main draw ==
Last 24; Best of 7 frames
15	Ricky Walden (ENG)	4
12	Liang Wenbo (CHN)	1
21	Mark Davis (ENG)	4
24	Joe Jogia (ENG)	0
22	Matthew Stevens (WAL)	4
23	Gerard Greene (NIR)	2
17	Stuart Bingham (ENG)	w/o
10	Stephen Maguire (SCO)	w/d
14	Marco Fu (HKG)	1
11	Michael Holt (ENG)	4
19	Jamie Jones (WAL)	0
13	Martin Gould (ENG)	4
16	Anthony Hamilton (ENG)	4
9	Tom Ford (ENG)	2
20	Andrew Higginson (ENG)	4
18	Jack Lisowski (ENG)	1

Last 16; Best of 7 frames
1	Shaun Murphy (ENG)	4
15	(England) Ricky Walden	2
8	Stephen Lee (ENG)	4
21	(England) Mark Davis	1
7	Dominic Dale (WAL)	1
22	(Wales) Matthew Stevens	4
4	Marcus Campbell (SCO)	4
17	(England) Stuart Bingham	3
3	Barry Pinches (ENG)	3
11	(England) Michael Holt	4
5	Judd Trump (ENG)	2
13	(England) Martin Gould	4
6	Mark Williams (WAL)	4
16	(England) Anthony Hamilton	0
2	Mark Selby (ENG)	4
20	(England) Andrew Higginson	0

Quarter-finals; Best of 7 frames
1	(England) Shaun Murphy	4
8	(England) Stephen Lee	3
22	(Wales) Matthew Stevens	4
4	(Scotland) Marcus Campbell	0
11	(England) Michael Holt	2
13	(England) Martin Gould	4
6	(Wales) Mark Williams	3
2	(England) Mark Selby	4

Semi-finals; Best of 7 frames
1	(England) Shaun Murphy	4
22	(Wales) Matthew Stevens	0
13	(England) Martin Gould	4
2	(England) Mark Selby	3

Final; Best of 7 frames
1	(England) Shaun Murphy	4
13	(England) Martin Gould	0

== Final ==
Final: Best of 7 frames. Referee: Michaela Tabb. The Helix, Dublin, Ireland, 20 March 2011.
Shaun Murphy; England	4–0	Martin Gould; England
70–18, 66–46, 59–44 (53), 51–34
53	Highest break	45
0	Century breaks	0
1	50+ breaks	0

== Century breaks ==
- 143, 111 – Mark Williams
- 133 – Anthony Hamilton
- 128 – Andrew Higginson
- 126 – Marcus Campbell
- 116 – Shaun Murphy
- 113 – Judd Trump
- 110, 102 – Michael Holt
- 106, 100 – Martin Gould
- 103, 100 – Stephen Lee
