= Paul Davison =

English snooker player

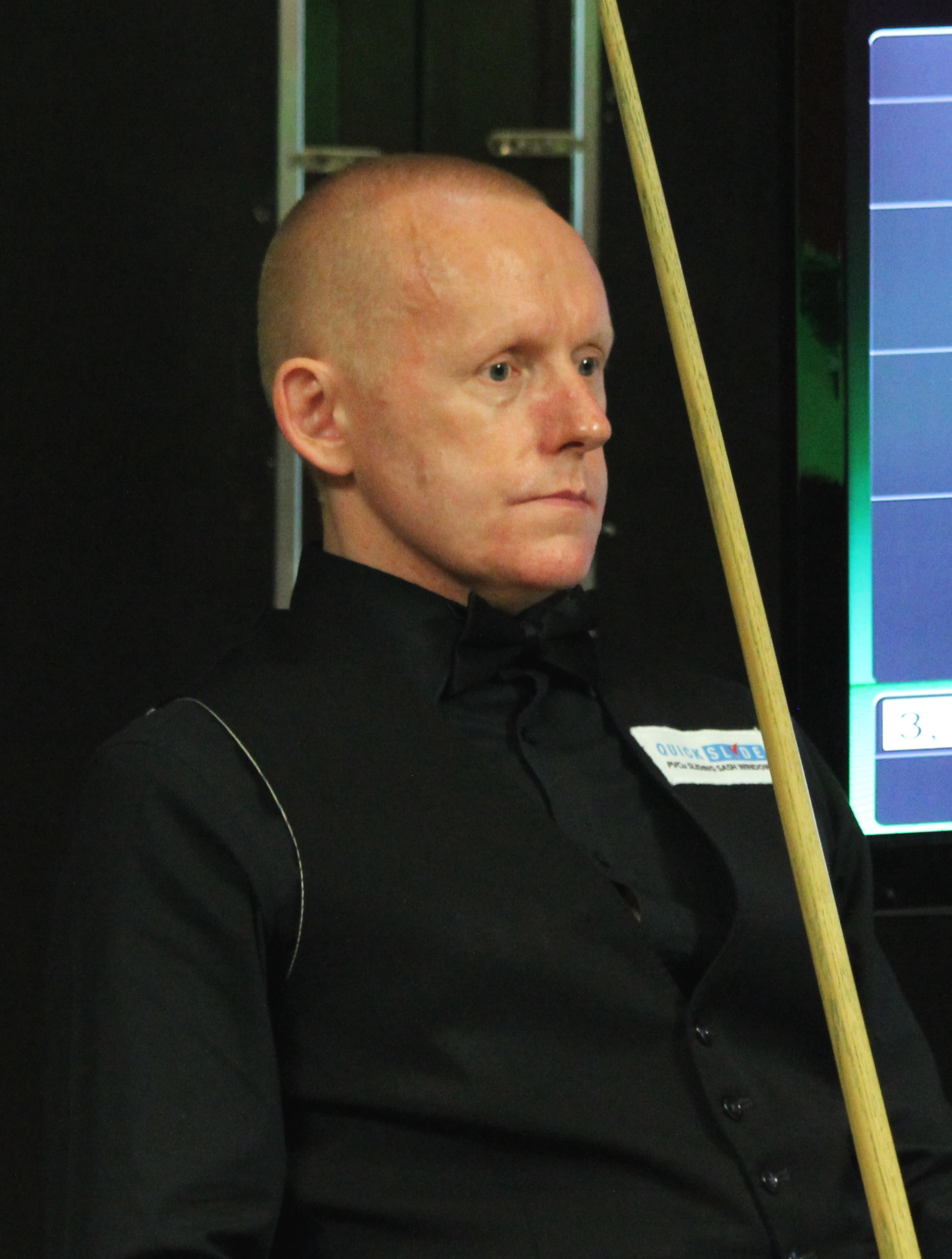
- Davison at the 2016 Paul Hunter Classic

Personal information
- Nickname: Snowy
- Born: 1 October 1971 (age 55) Pickering, North Riding of Yorkshire, England

Sport
- Country: England
- Sport: Snooker
- Professional: 1992–1997, 1998/1999, 2001–2003, 2004/2005, 2006/2007, 2008/2009, 2010–2014, 2015–2019
- Highest ranking: 70 (November–December 2012)
- Best ranking finish: Last 16 (x1)

Paul S. Davison (born 1 October 1971) is an English former professional snooker player from Pickering, North Yorkshire. First earning a place on the World Snooker Tour in 1992, he played on the tour until 1997, and has since regained his place on the Tour on three further occasions, most recently in the 2018-19 snooker season. Davison reached a peak of 70th in the world snooker rankings in 2012, and the farthest into a ranking tournament at the 2017 Riga Masters. He has made a total of 76 professional century breaks, the highest being a 144 made in qualifying for the 2001 World Snooker Championship.

== Career ==
=== Early career ===
In the 2009–10 season he finished third in the PIOS rankings, and thus retained his place on the 2010/2011 professional Main Tour. He came through three qualification matches, concluding with a narrow 5–4 victory over Dominic Dale, to progress to the wildcard round of the 2012 German Masters. He beat Pole Krzysztof Wróbel 5–2 to reach the main stage of a ranking event for the first time, drawing reigning UK Champion Judd Trump and was soundly beaten 1–5 in only 75 minutes.

The run earned him valuable ranking points as he continued to strive towards his goal of getting into the top 64 in the world to ensure his place on the tour for next season. However, he did not win another match in the remainder of the season and finished it ranked world number 81, meaning he had to enter Q School to have a chance of playing in the 2012–13 season. In May, Davison won five matches at the second Q School event, concluding with a 4–2 win over Gareth Allen to earn a place on the tour for the next two years.

=== 2012/2013 season ===
Davison almost qualified for the 2012 International Championship, the fourth ranking event of the 2012/2013 season. He saw off Fraser Patrick, Peter Lines and Ben Woollaston, but then lost 3–6 to Dominic Dale in the final round. Davison had a consistent year in the minor-ranking Players Tour Championship Events, with his best result coming in the third European Tour Event, where he beat Ricky Norris, Joel Walker and Chris Norbury, before losing to world number one Mark Selby 3–4 in the last 16. He reached the last 32 on two other occasions which helped Davison finish 48th on the PTC Order of Merit. Davison's season ended when he lost 7–10 to Alfie Burden in the second round of World Championship Qualifying, which saw him end the year ranked world number 75.

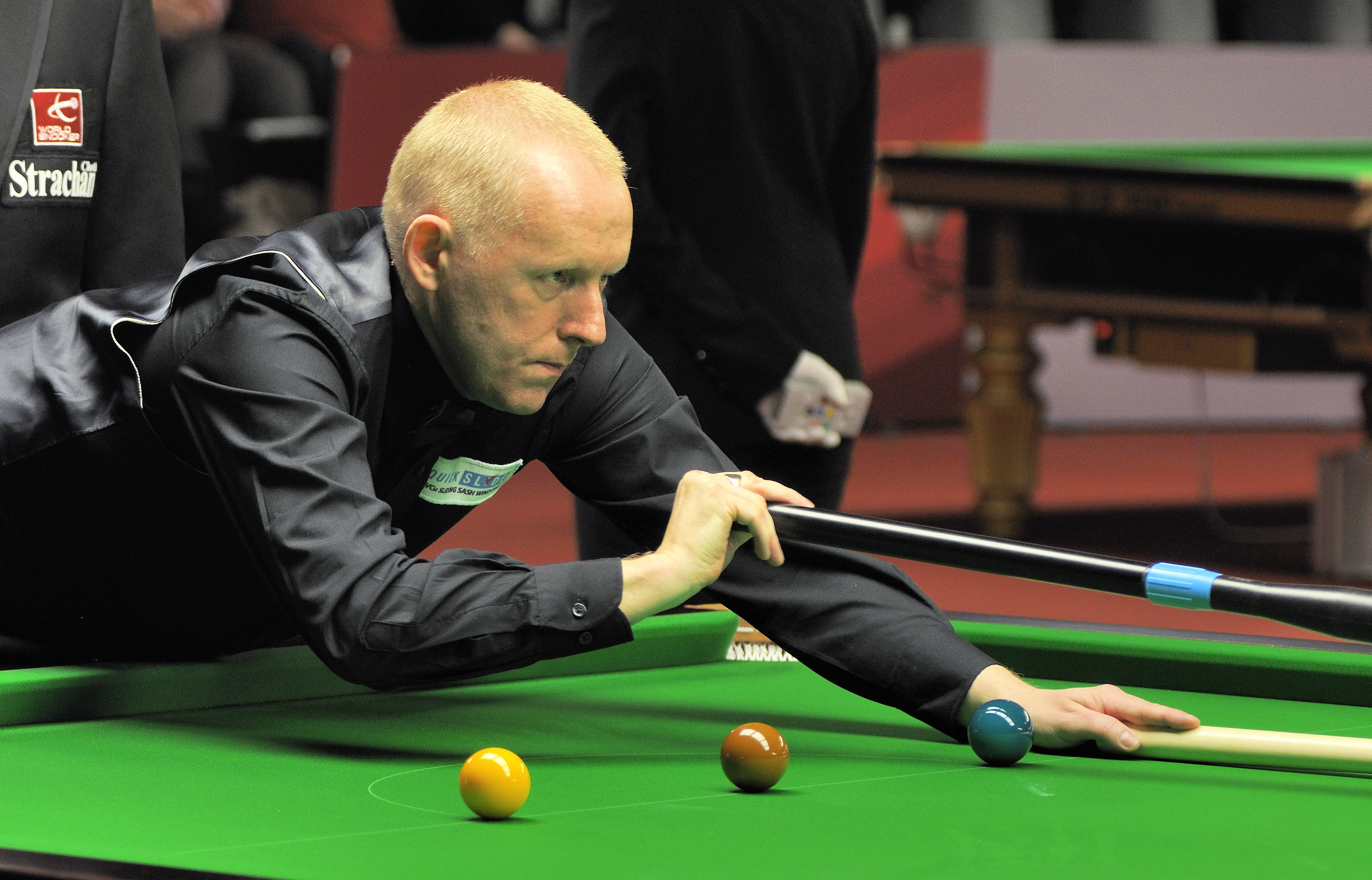
Paul Davison at 2014 German Masters

=== 2013/2014 season ===
In the qualifiers for the Australian Goldfields Open Davison won his first match of the season 5–4 against Andrew Norman, making a 141 break during the match. Further wins over Peter Lines and Mark King followed to see Davison into the main draw of a ranking event for the second time in his career. In the first round he made breaks of 112 and 124 to lead Mark Davis 4–3 with his opponent requiring a snooker with one red left. Davis got the snooker on the final pink and potted the pink and black to level the match. Davison also led the deciding frame 49–10 but would ultimately lose the match 5–4. Davison defeated Gerard Greene 6–4 in the first round of the UK Championship and raced into a 3–0 second round lead against world number seven Shaun Murphy, before conceding six frames in a row to exit the event. After the match Davison said that he loved the experience and had done very little wrong in the match as Murphy's fightback was as good matchplay snooker as you could see.

Davison's second last 32 appearance of the season came at the German Masters after he recorded one of the best results of his career by knocking out world number nine Marco Fu 5–2. He led Rod Lawler 4–1 in the next round but could not reach the last 16 of a ranking event for the first time as he was defeated 5–4. After Davison lost 10–2 against Alan McManus in World Championship qualifying he could no longer reach the top 64 in the world rankings as he was placed 82nd and therefore played in Q School in an attempt to earn his place back. He lost in the last 64 in both events to fall well short of doing so.

=== 2014/2015 season ===
It’s nice to be back as a pro because it was tough last year playing as an amateur. I believe I am as good a player as I’ve ever been and that age is no barrier – Stuart Bingham showed that by winning the World title for the first time at the age of 38. I’m sure most players think about giving up snooker at some point. But I keep myself in good shape and still believe I can play for another five or ten years.

— Davison on winning his place back on the tour.

Davison played in all six of the minor-ranking European Tour events during the 2014–15 season. His best performance came at the Riga Open, where he reached the last 32 with 4–3 and 4–1 wins over Jack Lisowski and Gerard Greene respectively, but he then lost 4–2 to Matthew Selt. A 4–3 victory against Kyren Wilson at the Paul Hunter Classic was his only other win in a European Tour event, with Davison losing 4–3 to Dechawat Poomjaeng in the subsequent round. He had two chances to rejoin the professional tour. The first came at the EBSA Play-offs where Davison was knocked out 4–3 by Martin O'Donnell in round two. His second came at the 2015 Q School and in the second event Davison won six games, concluding with a 4–3 victory over Luke Simmonds to earn a two-year tour card.

=== 2015/2016 season ===
Davison lost eight matches in a row from October 2015 until April 2016 when he beat Yu Delu 10–9 in the first round of World Championship. He lost 10–7 to Thepchaiya Un-Nooh in the following round. He only won a total of four matches all season.

=== 2016/2017 season ===
Davison knocked out three players to reach the final qualifying round for the Shanghai Masters, but he was thrashed 5–0 by Anthony McGill. He recovered from 2–0 down against Gary Wilson in the opening round of the UK Championship to win 6–3, before losing 6–4 to Ben Woollaston. After beating Joe Swail 4–0 in the first round of the Welsh Open, Davison was defeated 4–1 by Zhou Yuelong. He qualified for the China Open, but lost 5–0 in the opening round to Ding Junhui and entered Q School again to try and stay on the tour as he would have been relegated from it at the end of the season due to being ranked world number 91. He won through to the final round of the first event and was defeated 4–2 by Billy Castle. Davison also got to the final round of the second event and this time beat James Cahill 4–2 to remain on tour and mean he has successfully advanced through Q School three times.

== Performance and rankings timeline ==
Tournament	1992/ 93	1993/ 94	1994/ 95	1995/ 96	1996/ 97	1997/ 98	1998/ 99	1999/ 00	2000/ 01	2001/ 02	2002/ 03	2003/ 04	2004/ 05	2006/ 07	2008/ 09	2010/ 11	2011/ 12	2012/ 13	2013/ 14	2014/ 15	2015/ 16	2016/ 17	2017/ 18	2018/ 19	2019/ 20	2020/ 21
Ranking (Note: From the 2010/2011 season it shows the ranking at the beginning of the season.)	(Note: New players on the Main Tour don't have a ranking.)	283	237	202	165	(Note: He was an amateur.)					98						72	(Note: Players qualified through Q School started the season without prize money ranking points.)	74			79		87		
Ranking tournaments
European Masters (Note: The event was called the European Open (1992/1993–1996/1997 and 2001/2002–2003/2004) and the Malta Cup (2004/2005–2007/2008))	LQ	LQ	LQ	LQ	LQ	NH	LQ	Not Held		LQ	LQ	A	LQ	LQ	Tournament Not Held							LQ	LQ	1R	LQ	A
English Open	Tournament Not Held																					1R	1R	1R	A	1R
Championship League	Tournament Not Held														Non-Ranking Event											RR
Northern Ireland Open	Tournament Not Held																					1R	2R	1R	A	1R
UK Championship	LQ	LQ	LQ	LQ	LQ	A	LQ	A	A	LQ	LQ	A	LQ	LQ	LQ	LQ	LQ	LQ	2R	A	1R	2R	1R	2R	A	1R
Scottish Open (Note: The event was called the International Open (1992/1993–1996/1997) and the Players Championship (2003/2004))	LQ	LQ	LQ	LQ	LQ	A	LQ	A	A	LQ	LQ	A	Tournament Not Held					MR	Not Held			1R	1R	2R	A	1R
World Grand Prix	Tournament Not Held																			NR	DNQ	DNQ	DNQ	DNQ	DNQ	DNQ
German Masters (Note: The event was called the German Open (1995/1996–1997/1998))	Not Held			LQ	LQ	A	NR	Tournament Not Held								LQ	1R	LQ	2R	A	LQ	LQ	LQ	LQ	LQ	LQ
Shoot-Out	Tournament Not Held															Non-Ranking Event						1R	1R	1R	1R	1R
Welsh Open	LQ	LQ	LQ	LQ	LQ	A	LQ	A	A	LQ	LQ	A	LQ	LQ	LQ	LQ	LQ	LQ	1R	A	1R	2R	1R	3R	A	1R
Players Championship (Note: The event was called the Players Tour Championship Grand Finals (2010/2011–2012/2013) and the Players Championship Grand Final (2013/2014–2015/2016))	Tournament Not Held															DNQ	DNQ	DNQ	DNQ	DNQ	DNQ	DNQ	DNQ	DNQ	DNQ	DNQ
Gibraltar Open	Tournament Not Held																				MR	1R	1R	1R	A	1R
WST Pro Series	Tournament Not Held																									RR
Tour Championship	Tournament Not Held																							DNQ	DNQ	DNQ
World Championship	LQ	LQ	LQ	LQ	LQ	LQ	LQ	LQ	LQ	LQ	LQ	LQ	LQ	LQ	LQ	LQ	LQ	LQ	LQ	A	LQ	LQ	LQ	LQ	LQ	LQ
Non-ranking tournaments
World Seniors Championship	Tournament Not Held															A	A	A	A	LQ	A	A	A	A	A	A
The Masters	LQ	LQ	LQ	LQ	LQ	LQ	LQ	LQ	LQ	LQ	LQ	A	LQ	LQ	LQ	A	A	A	A	A	A	A	A	A	A	A
Former ranking tournaments
Dubai Classic (Note: The event was called the Thailand Classic in 1995/1996 and the Asian Classic in 1996/1997)	LQ	LQ	LQ	LQ	LQ	Tournament Not Held																				
Thailand Masters (Note: The event was called the Asian Open (1992/1993) and the Thailand Open (1993/1994–1996/1997))	LQ	LQ	LQ	LQ	LQ	A	LQ	A	A	NR	Not Held			NR	Tournament Not Held											
British Open	LQ	LQ	LQ	LQ	LQ	A	LQ	A	A	LQ	LQ	A	LQ	Tournament Not Held												
Irish Masters	Non-Ranking Event										LQ	A	LQ	NR	Tournament Not Held											
Northern Ireland Trophy	Tournament Not Held													LQ	LQ	Tournament Not Held										
Bahrain Championship	Tournament Not Held														LQ	Tournament Not Held										
Wuxi Classic (Note: The event was called the Jiangsu Classic (2008/2009–2009/2010))	Tournament Not Held														Non-Ranking Event			LQ	LQ	LQ	Tournament Not Held					
Australian Goldfields Open (Note: The event was called the Australian Open (1994/1995) and Australian Masters (1995/1996))	Not Held		Non-Ranking		Tournament Not held													LQ	LQ	1R	LQ	Tournament Not Held				
Shanghai Masters	Tournament Not Held														LQ	LQ	LQ	LQ	LQ	A	LQ	LQ	LQ	Non-Ranking		NH
Paul Hunter Classic (Note: The event was called the Grand Prix Fürth (2004/2005) and the Fürth German Open (2005/2006–2006/2007))	Tournament Not Held												Pro-am Event			Minor-Ranking Event						1R	3R	1R	NR	NH
Indian Open	Tournament Not Held																		1R	LQ	NH	LQ	LQ	1R	Not Held	
China Open (Note: The event was called the China International (1997/1998–1998/1999))	Tournament Not Held					NR	LQ	A	A	LQ	Not Held		LQ	LQ	LQ	LQ	LQ	LQ	LQ	A	LQ	1R	1R	LQ	Not Held	
Riga Masters (Note: The event was called the Riga Open (2014/2015–2015/2016))	Tournament Not Held																			Minor-Rank		LQ	3R	LQ	LQ	NH
International Championship	Tournament Not Held																	LQ	1R	A	LQ	LQ	LQ	LQ	A	NH
China Championship	Tournament Not Held																					NR	LQ	LQ	A	NH
World Open (Note: The event was called the Grand Prix (1992/1993–2000/2001 and 2004/2005–2009/2010) and the LG Cup (2001/2002–2003/2004))	LQ	LQ	LQ	LQ	LQ	A	LQ	A	A	LQ	LQ	A	LQ	RR	LQ	LQ	LQ	LQ	LQ	Not Held		LQ	LQ	1R	A	NH
Former non-ranking tournaments
Shoot-Out	Tournament Not Held															A	A	1R	1R	A	A	Ranking Event				
Haining Open	Tournament Not Held																			Minor-Rank		1R	A	2R	A	NH

Performance Table Legend
LQ	lost in the qualifying draw	#R	lost in the early rounds of the tournament (WR = Wildcard round, RR = Round robin)	QF	lost in the quarter-finals
SF	lost in the semi-finals	F	lost in the final	W	won the tournament
DNQ	did not qualify for the tournament	A	did not participate in the tournament	WD	withdrew from the tournament
DQ	disqualified from the tournament				

NH / Not Held	event was not held.
NR / Non-Ranking Event	event is/was no longer a ranking event.
R / Ranking Event	event is/was a ranking event.
MR / Minor-Ranking Event	event is/was a minor-ranking event.

== Career finals ==
=== Non-ranking finals: 2 ===
Outcome	No.	Year	Championship	Opponent in the final	Score
Runner-up	1.	2001	Merseyside Professional Championship	(England) Nick Dyson	2–5
Runner-up	2.	2003	Challenge Tour - Event 1	(England) Stefan Mazrocis	2–6

=== Pro-am finals: 2 ===
Outcome	No.	Year	Championship	Opponent in the final	Score
Runner-up	1.	2008	Pontins Pro-Am - Event 5	(England) Peter Lines	1–4
Runner-up	2.	2009	Pontins Pro-Am - Event 2	(Wales) Michael White	3–5

=== Amateur finals: 7 (4 titles) ===
Outcome	No.	Year	Championship	Opponent in the final	Score
Runner-up	1.	2002	English Open	(Wales) Richard King	5–8
Winner	1.	2004	EASB Open Tour - Event 8	(England) Wayne Cooper	4–2
Runner-up	2.	2006	PIOS - Event 5	(England) Chris Melling	5–6
Runner-up	3.	2006	PIOS - Event 6	(China) Liu Song	3–6
Winner	2.	2007	PIOS - Event 6	(England) Michael King	6–2
Winner	3.	2009	PIOS - Event 3	(England) Kyren Wilson	6–4
Winner	4.	2010	PIOS - Event 7	(England) Justin Astley	6–2
