= Shailesh Jogia =

English snooker player (born 1975)

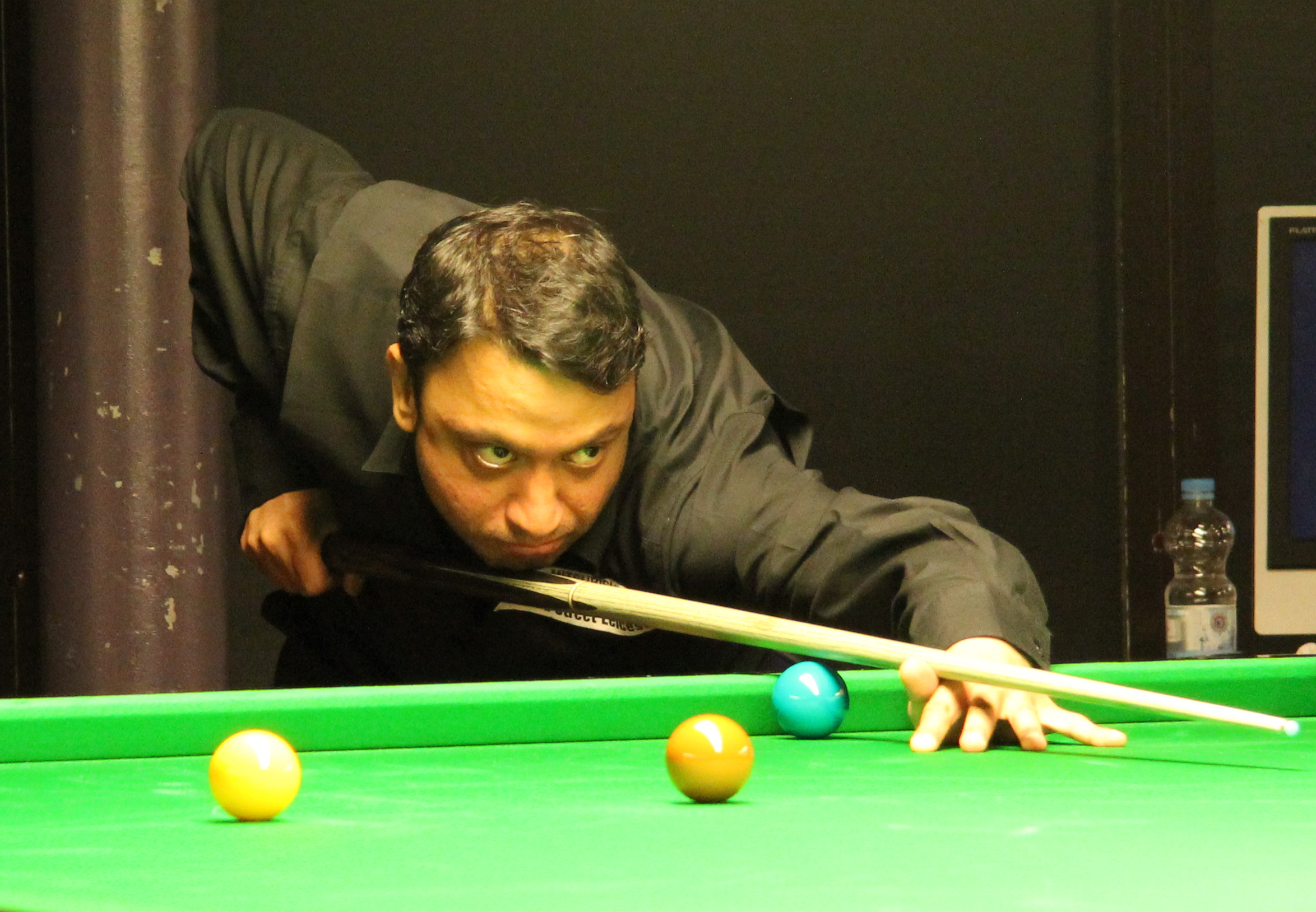
- Jogia at the 2011 Paul Hunter Classic

Personal information
- Nickname: Joe
- Born: 13 November 1975 (age 50)

Sport
- Country: England
- Sport: Snooker
- Professional: 1994–2012
- Highest ranking: 44 (August–September and December 2011)
- Best ranking finish: Last 32 (x4)

Shailesh "Joe" Jogia (born 13 November 1975) is an English former professional snooker player.

== Career ==
Jogia reached the last 32 of four ranking events, the first two being the 2004 Grand Prix and British Open. He won the English Open title in 1998. His highest break in a ranking event is 137, in qualifying rounds of the 2009 Grand Prix, although he has also made a 147 maximum in pro-am play.

He dropped off the pro Main Tour after the 2006–07 season. In 2008–09 he topped the pro-am International Open Series to regain a place on the Main Tour, although this was a wildcard place as he was not a member of his national governing body at that time.

He qualified for the last 32 of a ranking event for the first time in 6 years at the 2010 World Open, where he played Liu Song and lost 3–1.

Jogia made it to the main stage of the UK Championship for the first time in 2011 by beating Jamie Cope 6–3 in the final round of qualifying. He was drawn against world number 2, Mark Williams, and won two successive frames to tie the match at 4–4. Unfortunately, Jogia had a bad "kick" while well placed to win the next frame and would lose the match 6–4. Jogia had a good season in the minor-ranking Players Tour Championship series as he played in all 12 of the events, reaching the semi-finals in the first event, where he lost 2–4 to Ronnie O'Sullivan. He also had two last 16 finishes to be placed 28th on the PTC Order of Merit, just out of the top 24 who qualified for the PTC Finals. Jogia only won one more match in qualifying after his UK Championship exploits and finished the season ranked world number 47.

On 30 May 2012, it was announced by World Snooker that Jogia had been suspended from playing on the tour because of unusual betting patterns on his match against Matthew Selt in the Snooker Shoot-Out, which was due to take place on 28 January 2012. A high number of bets were placed on Jogia to lose the match, which he claimed was because of an injury to his knee and the assumption that he would be unable to play to an adequate standard. Jogia withdrew from the event the day before it started, but faced a formal hearing of the World Snooker Disciplinary Committee in July. At the hearing it was revealed that Jogia had been in repeated communication with two people who placed 19 bets on the match and that 11 of these bets had been placed before he sought medical attention regarding his knee injury. Jogia was banned from snooker until after the 2014 World Championship and fined £2,000 as a contribution to the cost of the investigation.

On 7 January 2013, Jogia was removed from the snooker world rankings following ET 2012/13 – Event 6, after his WPBSA membership was terminated.

== Performance and rankings timeline ==
Tournament	1994/ 95	1995/ 96	1996/ 97	1997/ 98	1998/ 99	1999/ 00	2000/ 01	2001/ 02	2002/ 03	2003/ 04	2004/ 05	2005/ 06	2006/ 07	2007/ 08	2009/ 10	2010/ 11	2011/ 12
Ranking	(Note: New players don't have a ranking)	257	167	(Note: He was an amateur)								63	62	67		70	49
Ranking tournaments
Australian Goldfields Open (Note: The event was called the Australian Open (1994/1995–1995/1996) and the Australian Masters (1995/1996))	Non-Ranking		Tournament Not Held														LQ
Shanghai Masters	Tournament Not Held													LQ	LQ	LQ	LQ
UK Championship	LQ	LQ	LQ	A	A	A	LQ	A	A	A	LQ	LQ	LQ	LQ	LQ	LQ	1R
German Masters (Note: The event was called the German Open (1995/1996–1997/1998))	NH	LQ	LQ	A	NR	Tournament Not Held										LQ	LQ
Welsh Open	LQ	LQ	LQ	A	A	A	LQ	A	A	A	LQ	LQ	LQ	LQ	LQ	LQ	LQ
World Open (Note: The event was called the Grand Prix (1994/1995–2000/2001, 2004/2005–2007/2008 and 2009/2010) and the LG Cup (2001/2002–2003/2004))	LQ	LQ	LQ	A	A	A	LQ	A	A	A	2R	1R	LQ	LQ	LQ	1R	LQ
Players Tour Championship Grand Final	Tournament Not Held															1R	DNQ
China Open (Note: The event was called the China International (1997/1998–1998/1999))	Tournament Not Held			NR	A	A	LQ	A	Not Held		LQ	LQ	WR	LQ	LQ	LQ	LQ
World Championship	LQ	LQ	LQ	LQ	LQ	LQ	LQ	LQ	A	LQ	LQ	LQ	LQ	LQ	LQ	LQ	LQ
Non-ranking tournaments
The Masters	A	LQ	LQ	LQ	A	LQ	LQ	LQ	LQ	LQ	A	LQ	LQ	LQ	LQ	A	A
Shoot-Out	Tournament Not Held															1R	A
Former ranking tournaments
Asian Classic (Note: The event was called the Dubai Classic (1994/1995) and the Thailand Classic (1995/1996))	LQ	LQ	LQ	Tournament Not Held													
Thailand Masters (Note: The event was called the Thailand Open (1994/1995–1996/1997))	LQ	LQ	LQ	A	A	A	LQ	A	NR	Tournament Not Held			NR	Tournament Not Held			
Players Championship (Note: The event was called the International Open (1994/1995–1996/1997) and the Scottish Open (1997/1998–2002/2003))	LQ	LQ	LQ	A	A	A	LQ	A	A	A	Tournament Not Held						
British Open	LQ	LQ	LQ	A	A	A	LQ	A	A	A	2R	Tournament Not Held					
Irish Masters	Non-Ranking Event								A	A	LQ	NH	NR	Tournament Not Held			
Malta Cup (Note: The event was called the European Open (1994/1995–1996/1997 and 2001/2002–2003/2004) and the Irish Open (1998/1999))	LQ	LQ	LQ	NH	A	Not Held		A	A	A	LQ	LQ	LQ	NR	Tournament Not Held		
Northern Ireland Trophy	Tournament Not Held											NR	LQ	LQ	Tournament Not Held		
Former non-ranking tournaments
Merseyside Professional Championship	A	A	A	A	2R	A	A	A	A	A	A	Tournament Not Held					

Performance Table Legend
LQ	lost in the qualifying draw	#R	lost in the early rounds of the tournament (WR = Wildcard round, RR = Round robin)	QF	lost in the quarter-finals
SF	lost in the semi-finals	F	lost in the final	W	won the tournament
DNQ	did not qualify for the tournament	A	did not participate in the tournament	WD	withdrew from the tournament

NH / Not Held	means an event was not held
NR / Non-Ranking Event	means an event is/was no longer a ranking event
R / Ranking Event	means an event is/was a ranking event
