= Justin Astley =

English snooker player

Personal information
- Born: 20 May 1983 (age 43) Darwen, Lancashire, England

Sport
- Country: England
- Sport: Snooker
- Professional: 2002/2003, 2005/2006, 2010/2011
- Highest ranking: 78 (June–July 2010, June 2011)

Justin Astley (born 20 May 1983) is an English former professional snooker player. He played on Challenge Tour in 2001/02, and first qualified for the Main Tour in 2002/03, but lost his place. Then he played on Challenge Tour again from 2003 to 2005. He returned for the 2005/2006 season, but he couldn't defend his place. In the 2009–10 season he reached the finals of the last two events of the International Open Series and was ranked seventh in the 2009/2010 PIOS rankings. As a result, Astley qualified for the 2010/2011 professional Main Tour, but dropped off at the end of the season.
