= Players Tour Championship 2011/2012 – Event 11 =

Players Tour Championship 2011/2012 Event 11
Tournament information
- Dates: 17–19 December 2011
- Venue: English Institute of Sport
- City: Sheffield
- Country: England
- Organisation: World Snooker
- Format: Minor-ranking event
- Total prize fund: €50,595
- Winner's share: €10,000
- Highest break: Ding Junhui (CHN) (147); Jamie Cope (ENG) (147)

Final
- Champion: Tom Ford (ENG)
- Runner-up: Martin Gould (ENG)
- Score: 4–3

The Players Tour Championship 2011/2012 – Event 11 was a professional minor-ranking snooker tournament that took place between 17 and 19 December 2011 at the English Institute of Sport in Sheffield, England. The preliminary round took place on 10 December at the World Snooker Academy. The main round matches were split between the World Snooker Academy and the Badminton Hall of the venue. One table was broadcast on Eurosport. Despite being held in England, the event counted towards the Order of Merit as a European event.

Ding Junhui made the 84th official maximum break during his last 128 match against James Cahill. This was Ding's fourth 147 break and his second within three days. The next day Jamie Cope made the 85th official maximum break in the last 32 against Kurt Maflin. This was Cope's third 147 break.

Tom Ford wins his second professional title by defeating Martin Gould 4–3 in the final.

== Prize fund and ranking points ==
The breakdown of prize money and ranking points of the event is shown below:

	Prize fund	Ranking points^{1}
Winner	€10,000	2,000
Runner-up	€5,000	1,600
Semi-finalist	€2,500	1,280
Quarter-finalist	€1,500	1,000
Last 16	€1,000	760
Last 32	€600	560
Last 64	€200	360
Maximum break	€595	–
Total	€50,595	–

- ^{1} Only professional players can earn ranking points.

== Main draw ==
=== Preliminary round ===
Best of 7 frames

(England) Mark Miller	4–2	(England) Steve Ventham
(Scotland) Scott Donaldson	4–1	(England) Christopher Keogan
(England) Sean O'Sullivan	4–0	(Belgium) Hans Blanckaert
(England) Michael Wasley	3–4	(England) David Gray
(England) Stephen Groves	4–1	(England) Rogelio Esteiro
(England) Ben Harrison	3–4	(England) James Cahill
(Wales) Kishan Hirani	1–4	(England) Oliver Brown
(England) Phil O'Kane	2–4	(England) Martin Ball
(England) Stuart Wood	2–4	(England) Andrew Milliard
(England) Mitchell Travis	1–4	(China) Zhang Anda
(England) Greg Davis	1–4	(England) Saqib Nasir
(Scotland) Michael Leslie	4–1	(England) Joel Walker
(England) Brandon Winstone	1–4	(China) Chen Zhe
(England) Mitchell Mann	4–1	(England) Wayne Townsend
(Scotland) Ross Muir	4–1	(England) Ashley Gregory

(England) Stephen Winston	1–4	(England) Chris Norbury
(Scotland) Ross Higgins	1–4	(England) Barry Stark
(England) Charlie Walters	1–4	(Wales) Duane Jones
(England) Ricky Norris	4–2	(England) Sam Harvey
(England) Liam Monk	3–4	(England) George Marter
(England) Matthew Day	4–1	(England) Jamie Gibson
(England) James Hill	4–0	(England) Sachin Plaha
(England) Jamie O'Neill	3–4	(England) Ashley Carty
(England) Reanne Evans	4–3	(England) Tom Maxfield
(England) James McGouran	3–4	(England) Ashley Wright
(England) Justin Astley	4–3	(England) Toby Simpson
(England) Thomas Wealthy	w/o–w/d	(England) Sydney Wilson
(England) Eric Pei	0–4	(England) Oliver Lines
(England) Shane Castle	3–4	(Wales) Gareth Allen
(England) Billy Par	3–4	(India) David Singh

=== Main rounds ===
==== Top half ====
===== Section 1 =====
Last 128; Best of 7 frames
(Australia) Neil Robertson	1
(Wales) Dominic Dale	4
(England) Shaun Murphy	4
(England) Mark Miller	0
(Hong Kong) Marco Fu	4
(Scotland) Scott Donaldson	1
(Scotland) Stephen Maguire	4
(England) Sean O'Sullivan	1
(England) Mark King	1
(England) Gary Wilson	4
(Scotland) Marcus Campbell	4
(England) David Gray	0
(Belgium) Luca Brecel	4
(England) Mike Dunn	1
(England) Mark Davis	4
(England) Matthew Couch	0

Last 64; Best of 7 frames
(Wales) Dominic Dale	4
(England) Shaun Murphy	2
(Hong Kong) Marco Fu	2
(Scotland) Stephen Maguire	4
(England) Gary Wilson	1
(Scotland) Marcus Campbell	4
(Belgium) Luca Brecel	1
(England) Mark Davis	4

Last 32; Best of 7 frames
(Wales) Dominic Dale	2
(Scotland) Stephen Maguire	4
(Scotland) Marcus Campbell	3
(England) Mark Davis	4

Last 16; Best of 7 frames
(Scotland) Stephen Maguire	0
(England) Mark Davis	4

===== Section 2 =====
Last 128; Best of 7 frames
(England) Liam Highfield	4
(England) Stephen Groves	3
(China) Ding Junhui	4
(England) James Cahill	1
(England) Jimmy Robertson	4
(England) Oliver Brown	0
(Scotland) Stephen Hendry	4
(England) Martin Ball	0
(England) Anthony Hamilton	4
(Scotland) Eden Sharav	2
(England) Joe Jogia	3
(England) Rod Lawler	4
(England) Ali Carter	w/d
(England) Andrew Milliard	w/o
(England) Craig Steadman	4
(China) Zhang Anda	2

Last 64; Best of 7 frames
(England) Liam Highfield	0
(China) Ding Junhui	4
(England) Jimmy Robertson	0
(Scotland) Stephen Hendry	4
(England) Anthony Hamilton	4
(England) Rod Lawler	0
(England) Andrew Milliard	0
(England) Craig Steadman	4

Last 32; Best of 7 frames
(China) Ding Junhui	4
(Scotland) Stephen Hendry	2
(England) Anthony Hamilton	4
(England) Craig Steadman	3

Last 16; Best of 7 frames
(China) Ding Junhui	3
(England) Anthony Hamilton	4

===== Section 3 =====
Last 128; Best of 7 frames
(England) Jack Lisowski	2
(England) David Grace	4
(Wales) Jamie Jones	4
(Scotland) Scott MacKenzie	3
(England) Peter Lines	4
(England) Saqib Nasir	3
(England) Martin Gould	4
(Scotland) Michael Leslie	2
(England) Kyren Wilson	0
(China) Chen Zhe	4
(England) Matthew Selt	w/o
(Poland) Kacper Filipiak	w/d
(England) Simon Bedford	4
(England) Mitchell Mann	1
(China) Liang Wenbo	4
(England) Stuart Carrington	2

Last 64; Best of 7 frames
(England) David Grace	3
(Wales) Jamie Jones	4
(England) Peter Lines	2
(England) Martin Gould	4
(China) Chen Zhe	4
(England) Matthew Selt	1
(England) Simon Bedford	4
(China) Liang Wenbo	0

Last 32; Best of 7 frames
(Wales) Jamie Jones	2
(England) Martin Gould	4
(China) Chen Zhe	3
(England) Simon Bedford	4

Last 16; Best of 7 frames
(England) Martin Gould	4
(England) Simon Bedford	0

===== Section 4 =====
Last 128; Best of 7 frames
(China) Xiao Guodong	4
(Scotland) Ross Muir	1
(England) Andrew Higginson	4
(England) Chris Norbury	3
(England) Robbie Williams	4
(England) Barry Stark	0
(England) Michael Holt	4
(Wales) Duane Jones	3
(Malta) Tony Drago	4
(England) Robert Milkins	3
(Wales) Matthew Stevens	4
(England) Ricky Norris	3
(England) Ben Woollaston	3
(England) Stephen Craigie	4
(England) Andy Hicks	4
(England) George Marter	3

Last 64; Best of 7 frames
(China) Xiao Guodong	1
(England) Andrew Higginson	4
(England) Robbie Williams	1
(England) Michael Holt	4
(Malta) Tony Drago	1
(Wales) Matthew Stevens	4
(England) Stephen Craigie	4
(England) Andy Hicks	1

Last 32; Best of 7 frames
(England) Andrew Higginson	2
(England) Michael Holt	4
(Wales) Matthew Stevens	4
(England) Stephen Craigie	1

Last 16; Best of 7 frames
(England) Michael Holt	4
(Wales) Matthew Stevens	1

==== Bottom half ====
===== Section 5 =====
Last 128; Best of 7 frames
(England) Mark Selby	4
(Wales) Daniel Wells	0
(China) Li Yan	0
(England) Matthew Day	4
(England) David Gilbert	4
(England) James Hill	0
(England) Stuart Bingham	2
(Wales) Mark Williams	4
(Northern Ireland) Gerard Greene	3
(England) Adam Wicheard	4
(England) Steve Davis	4
(Northern Ireland) Joe Swail	3
(Scotland) Graeme Dott	4
(England) Ashley Carty	1
(Wales) Ryan Day	4
(England) Paul Davison	2

Last 64; Best of 7 frames
(England) Mark Selby	4
(England) Matthew Day	0
(England) David Gilbert	2
(Wales) Mark Williams	4
(England) Adam Wicheard	1
(England) Steve Davis	4
(Scotland) Graeme Dott	4
(Wales) Ryan Day	3

Last 32; Best of 7 frames
(England) Mark Selby	4
(Wales) Mark Williams	0
(England) Steve Davis	1
(Scotland) Graeme Dott	4

Last 16; Best of 7 frames
(England) Mark Selby	0
(Scotland) Graeme Dott	4

===== Section 6 =====
Last 128; Best of 7 frames
(England) Joe Perry	1
(England) Ian McCulloch	4
(England) Dave Harold	4
(England) Reanne Evans	2
(England) Ricky Walden	w/o
(Wales) Jak Jones	w/d
(England) Barry Hawkins	4
(England) Alfie Burden	2
(Northern Ireland) Mark Allen	4
(England) Ashley Wright	0
(Wales) Michael White	4
(India) Aditya Mehta	2
(England) Stephen Lee	3
(England) Sam Craigie	4
(Scotland) John Higgins	3
(England) Justin Astley	4

Last 64; Best of 7 frames
(England) Ian McCulloch	4
(England) Dave Harold	2
(England) Ricky Walden	4
(England) Barry Hawkins	0
(Northern Ireland) Mark Allen	1
(Wales) Michael White	4
(England) Sam Craigie	4
(England) Justin Astley	0

Last 32; Best of 7 frames
(England) Ian McCulloch	2
(England) Ricky Walden	4
(Wales) Michael White	1
(England) Sam Craigie	4

Last 16; Best of 7 frames
(England) Ricky Walden	4
(England) Sam Craigie	2

===== Section 7 =====
Last 128; Best of 7 frames
(England) Tom Ford	4
(Republic of Ireland) David Hogan	1
(England) Mark Joyce	w/d
(England) Ian Burns	w/o
(Republic of Ireland) Fergal O'Brien	4
(England) Thomas Wealthy	2
(England) Nigel Bond	4
(India) Lucky Vatnani	1
(China) Yu Delu	4
(England) Andrew Norman	1
(Thailand) Dechawat Poomjaeng	4
(England) Peter Ebdon	3
(Thailand) James Wattana	4
(England) Adrian Gunnell	1
(Scotland) Jamie Burnett	4
(England) Oliver Lines	0

Last 64; Best of 7 frames
(England) Tom Ford	4
(England) Ian Burns	2
(Republic of Ireland) Fergal O'Brien	1
(England) Nigel Bond	4
(China) Yu Delu	4
(Thailand) Dechawat Poomjaeng	1
(Thailand) James Wattana	3
(Scotland) Jamie Burnett	4

Last 32; Best of 7 frames
(England) Tom Ford	4
(England) Nigel Bond	2
(China) Yu Delu	4
(Scotland) Jamie Burnett	1

Last 16; Best of 7 frames
(England) Tom Ford	4
(China) Yu Delu	0

===== Section 8 =====
Last 128; Best of 7 frames
(England) Rory McLeod	1
(Norway) Kurt Maflin	4
(England) Adam Duffy	4
(Wales) Andrew Pagett	1
(England) Jamie Cope	4
(Wales) Gareth Allen	2
(Scotland) Anthony McGill	w/o
(India) David Singh	w/d
(England) Jimmy White	2
(England) Barry Pinches	4
(Scotland) Alan McManus	4
(China) Liu Song	2
(Republic of Ireland) Ken Doherty	3
(Republic of Ireland) David Morris	4
(England) Judd Trump	4
(England) Sam Baird	0

Last 64; Best of 7 frames
(Norway) Kurt Maflin	4
(England) Adam Duffy	2
(England) Jamie Cope	4
(Scotland) Anthony McGill	0
(England) Barry Pinches	1
(Scotland) Alan McManus	4
(Republic of Ireland) David Morris	0
(England) Judd Trump	4

Last 32; Best of 7 frames
(Norway) Kurt Maflin	3
(England) Jamie Cope	4
(Scotland) Alan McManus	2
(England) Judd Trump	4

Last 16; Best of 7 frames
(England) Jamie Cope	0
(England) Judd Trump	4

==== Finals ====
Quarter-finals; Best of 7 frames		Semi-finals; Best of 7 frames		Final; Best of 7 frames
(England) Mark Davis	3
(England) Anthony Hamilton	4	(England) Anthony Hamilton	3
(England) Martin Gould	4	(England) Martin Gould	4
(England) Michael Holt	2			(England) Martin Gould	3
(Scotland) Graeme Dott	4			(England) Tom Ford	4
(England) Ricky Walden	1	(Scotland) Graeme Dott	0
(England) Tom Ford	4	(England) Tom Ford	4
(England) Judd Trump	1

== Century breaks ==
- 147, 135, 110 – Ding Junhui
- 147, 133, 111 – Jamie Cope
- 141, 132, 106 – Ian McCulloch
- 140, 124 – Judd Trump
- 140 – Marco Fu
- 140 – Michael Holt
- 139, 132, 117, 130 – Tom Ford
- 139, 130, 127, 115, 103, 103 – Martin Gould
- 139 – Steve Davis
- 137 – Paul Davison
- 136, 103 – Alan McManus
- 136 – Ricky Walden
- 129, 115 – David Gilbert
- 128 – Mark Selby
- 127 – Graeme Dott
- 124, 123 – Anthony Hamilton
- 123, 105, 101 – Simon Bedford
- 122 – James Wattana
- 121 – Mark Allen
- 119 – Michael White
- 118 – Ben Woollaston
- 117 – Tony Drago
- 114, 105 – Mark Davis
- 113 – Xiao Guodong
- 113 – Dave Harold
- 112, 101 – Dominic Dale
- 112 – Stuart Bingham
- 109, 103 – Duane Jones
- 105, 104 – Andrew Higginson
- 104 – Chen Zhe
- 102 – Luca Brecel
- 102 – Barry Hawkins
- 102 – Fergal O'Brien
- 101 – Stephen Maguire
- 101 – Kurt Maflin
- 101 – Nigel Bond
- 100 – Marcus Campbell
- 100 – Stephen Hendry
- 100 – Jamie Jones
