= Players Tour Championship 2011/2012 – Event 12 =

Players Tour Championship 2011/2012 Event 12
Tournament information
- Dates: 15–16 December 2011; 6–8 January 2012
- Venue: World Snooker Academy; Event Forum
- City: Sheffield; Fürstenfeldbruck
- Country: England; Germany
- Organisation: World Snooker
- Format: Minor-ranking event
- Total prize fund: €50,606
- Winner's share: €10,000
- Highest break: Matthew Stevens (WAL) (147); Ding Junhui (CHN) (147)

Final
- Champion: Stephen Maguire (SCO)
- Runner-up: Joe Perry (ENG)
- Score: 4–2

The Players Tour Championship 2011/2012 – Event 12 (also known as the 2012 FFB Snooker Open and the 2012 Arcaden Shopping Open for sponsorship purposes.) was a professional minor-ranking snooker tournament that took place between 15 and 16 December 2011 at the World Snooker Academy in Sheffield, England with the first three rounds and 6–8 January 2012 at the Event Forum in Fürstenfeldbruck, Germany from the last 16 onwards.

Matthew Stevens made the 82nd official maximum break during his last 128 match against Michael Wasley. This was Stevens' first 147 break. On the same day Ding Junhui made the 83rd official maximum break during his last 128 match against Brandon Winstone. This was Ding's third 147 break. This was the first time that two official maximum breaks have been compiled on the same day.

Stephen Maguire won his seventh professional title by defeating Joe Perry 4–2 in the final.

== Prize fund and ranking points ==
The breakdown of prize money and ranking points of the event is shown below:

	Prize fund	Ranking points^{1}
Winner	€10,000	2,000
Runner-up	€5,000	1,600
Semi-finalist	€2,500	1,280
Quarter-finalist	€1,500	1,000
Last 16	€1,000	760
Last 32	€600	560
Last 64	€200	360
Maximum break	€606	–
Total	€50,606	–

- ^{1} Only professional players can earn ranking points.

== Main draw ==
=== Top half ===
==== Section 1 ====
Last 128; Best of 7 frames
(England) Ben Woollaston	2
(Wales) Mark Williams	4
(England) Mike Dunn	4
(India) David Singh	1
(China) Liang Wenbo	4
(India) Aditya Mehta	2
(England) Andy Hicks	3
(Wales) Duane Jones	4
(Northern Ireland) Mark Allen	4
(England) Stuart Carrington	2
(England) Barry Hawkins	4
(England) Oliver Brown	1
(England) Mark Joyce	4
(China) Chen Zhe	2
(Northern Ireland) Joe Swail	4
(India) Lucky Vatnani	0

Last 64; Best of 7 frames
(Wales) Mark Williams	1
(England) Mike Dunn	4
(China) Liang Wenbo	4
(Wales) Duane Jones	2
(Northern Ireland) Mark Allen	4
(England) Barry Hawkins	0
(England) Mark Joyce	2
(Northern Ireland) Joe Swail	4

Last 32; Best of 7 frames
(England) Mike Dunn	4
(China) Liang Wenbo	1
(Northern Ireland) Mark Allen	4
(Northern Ireland) Joe Swail	1

Last 16; Best of 7 frames
(England) Mike Dunn	2
(Northern Ireland) Mark Allen	4

==== Section 2 ====
Last 128; Best of 7 frames
(England) Stuart Bingham	4
(England) Sam Harvey	0
(Wales) Matthew Stevens	4
(England) Michael Wasley	0
(Scotland) Anthony McGill	2
(England) David Grace	4
(England) Gary Wilson	0
(England) Jamie O'Neill	4
(England) Nigel Bond	4
(Scotland) Scott MacKenzie	0
(England) Jimmy White	4
(Scotland) Ross Higgins	3
(England) Matthew Selt	4
(England) Reanne Evans	2
(England) Martin Gould	4
(England) Martin Ball	0

Last 64; Best of 7 frames
(England) Stuart Bingham	3
(Wales) Matthew Stevens	4
(England) David Grace	4
(England) Jamie O'Neill	2
(England) Nigel Bond	3
(England) Jimmy White	4
(England) Matthew Selt	1
(England) Martin Gould	4

Last 32; Best of 7 frames
(Wales) Matthew Stevens	1
(England) David Grace	4
(England) Jimmy White	2
(England) Martin Gould	4

Last 16; Best of 7 frames
(England) David Grace	3
(England) Martin Gould	4

==== Section 3 ====
Last 128; Best of 7 frames
(Northern Ireland) Gerard Greene	4
(Wales) Gareth Allen	0
(England) Ricky Walden	4
(China) Liu Song	3
(England) Dave Harold	3
(England) Mitchell Mann	4
(China) Ding Junhui	4
(England) Brandon Winstone	0
(England) Simon Bedford	3
(England) Sam Baird	4
(China) Xiao Guodong	4
(England) Matthew Couch	1
(Wales) Michael White	4
(England) Greg Davis	1
(England) Tom Ford	1
(England) Robert Milkins	4

Last 64; Best of 7 frames
(Northern Ireland) Gerard Greene	2
(England) Ricky Walden	4
(England) Mitchell Mann	0
(China) Ding Junhui	4
(England) Sam Baird	3
(China) Xiao Guodong	4
(Wales) Michael White	2
(England) Robert Milkins	4

Last 32; Best of 7 frames
(England) Ricky Walden	4
(China) Ding Junhui	0
(China) Xiao Guodong	4
(England) Robert Milkins	2

Last 16; Best of 7 frames
(England) Ricky Walden	4
(China) Xiao Guodong	2

==== Section 4 ====
Last 128; Best of 7 frames
(England) David Gilbert	4
(Italy) Michele Battaglia	0
(England) Peter Lines	3
(Republic of Ireland) David Morris	4
(Belgium) Luca Brecel	4
(Scotland) Michael Leslie	2
(England) Stephen Lee	4
(England) Sam Craigie	1
(England) Joe Perry	4
(England) Stephen Craigie	1
(England) Robbie Williams	w/o
(Poland) Kacper Filipiak	w/d
(Scotland) John Higgins	4
(England) Steve Ventham	0
(England) Mark Davis	4
(Belgium) Hans Blanckaert	1

Last 64; Best of 7 frames
(England) David Gilbert	4
(Republic of Ireland) David Morris	3
(Belgium) Luca Brecel	2
(England) Stephen Lee	4
(England) Joe Perry	4
(England) Robbie Williams	0
(Scotland) John Higgins	1
(England) Mark Davis	4

Last 32; Best of 7 frames
(England) David Gilbert	4
(England) Stephen Lee	1
(England) Joe Perry	4
(England) Mark Davis	1

Last 16; Best of 7 frames
(England) David Gilbert	1
(England) Joe Perry	4

=== Bottom half ===
==== Section 5 ====
Last 128; Best of 7 frames
(Scotland) Graeme Dott	4
(England) Adam Wicheard	3
(Scotland) Marcus Campbell	4
(England) Peter Ebdon	2
(China) Li Yan	4
(England) Thomas Wealthy	3
(England) Craig Steadman	4
(Wales) Daniel Wells	1
(Thailand) Dechawat Poomjaeng	4
(England) Paul Davison	3
(England) Michael Holt	4
(England) James McGouran	0
(England) Steve Davis	4
(England) Liam Monk	2
(England) Jamie Cope	4
(England) Phil O'Kane	1

Last 64; Best of 7 frames
(Scotland) Graeme Dott	3
(Scotland) Marcus Campbell	4
(China) Li Yan	4
(England) Craig Steadman	3
(Thailand) Dechawat Poomjaeng	3
(England) Michael Holt	4
(England) Steve Davis	4
(England) Jamie Cope	3

Last 32; Best of 7 frames
(Scotland) Marcus Campbell	4
(China) Li Yan	2
(England) Michael Holt	4
(England) Steve Davis	2

Last 16; Best of 7 frames
(Scotland) Marcus Campbell	3
(England) Michael Holt	4

==== Section 6 ====
Last 128; Best of 7 frames
(Republic of Ireland) Ken Doherty	4
(Wales) Andrew Pagett	0
(England) Adam Duffy	4
(England) Shane Castle	1
(Scotland) Stephen Hendry	4
(England) Ben Harrison	0
(England) Liam Highfield	2
(Scotland) Scott Donaldson	4
(Wales) Ryan Day	4
(England) Jamie Gibson	0
(England) Kyren Wilson	4
(England) Chris Norbury	0
(Republic of Ireland) Fergal O'Brien	4
(England) Stuart Wood	0
(Hong Kong) Marco Fu	4
(England) Alfie Burden	1

Last 64; Best of 7 frames
(Republic of Ireland) Ken Doherty	4
(England) Adam Duffy	1
(Scotland) Stephen Hendry	4
(Scotland) Scott Donaldson	2
(Wales) Ryan Day	4
(England) Kyren Wilson	2
(Republic of Ireland) Fergal O'Brien	3
(Hong Kong) Marco Fu	4

Last 32; Best of 7 frames
(Republic of Ireland) Ken Doherty	2
(Scotland) Stephen Hendry	4
(Wales) Ryan Day	3
(Hong Kong) Marco Fu	4

Last 16; Best of 7 frames
(Scotland) Stephen Hendry	4
(Hong Kong) Marco Fu	2

==== Section 7 ====
Last 128; Best of 7 frames
(Malta) Tony Drago	4
(England) Rod Lawler	2
(England) Ali Carter	4
(England) Barry Pinches	2
(Scotland) Jamie Burnett	1
(China) Zhang Anda	4
(Scotland) Stephen Maguire	4
(England) Ricky Norris	1
(England) Rory McLeod	4
(England) Stephen Winston	1
(England) Anthony Hamilton	3
(England) Ian Burns	4
(Scotland) Alan McManus	4
(England) Adrian Gunnell	3
(England) Jimmy Robertson	1
(England) David Gray	4

Last 64; Best of 7 frames
(Malta) Tony Drago	2
(England) Ali Carter	4
(China) Zhang Anda	1
(Scotland) Stephen Maguire	4
(England) Rory McLeod	3
(England) Ian Burns	4
(Scotland) Alan McManus	0
(England) David Gray	4

Last 32; Best of 7 frames
(England) Ali Carter	1
(Scotland) Stephen Maguire	4
(England) Ian Burns	0
(England) David Gray	4

Last 16; Best of 7 frames
(Scotland) Stephen Maguire	4
(England) David Gray	1

==== Section 8 ====
Last 128; Best of 7 frames
(England) Jack Lisowski	4
(England) Andrew Norman	1
(England) Joe Jogia	4
(England) Mitchell Travis	3
(Thailand) James Wattana	3
(Norway) Kurt Maflin	4
(England) Shaun Murphy	4
(England) Ashley Wright	3
(Wales) Jamie Jones	0
(England) Ian McCulloch	4
(Wales) Jak Jones	4
(England) Matthew Day	1
(England) Mark King	4
(England) Oliver Lines	0
(England) Andrew Higginson	4
(Wales) Dominic Dale	0

Last 64; Best of 7 frames
(England) Jack Lisowski	4
(England) Joe Jogia	1
(Norway) Kurt Maflin	4
(England) Shaun Murphy	3
(England) Ian McCulloch	2
(Wales) Jak Jones	4
(England) Mark King	2
(England) Andrew Higginson	4

Last 32; Best of 7 frames
(England) Jack Lisowski	2
(Norway) Kurt Maflin	4
(Wales) Jak Jones	3
(England) Andrew Higginson	4

Last 16; Best of 7 frames
(Norway) Kurt Maflin	2
(England) Andrew Higginson	4

=== Finals ===
Quarter-finals; Best of 7 frames		Semi-finals; Best of 7 frames		Final; Best of 7 frames
(Northern Ireland) Mark Allen	3
(England) Martin Gould	4	(England) Martin Gould	0
(England) Ricky Walden	1	(England) Joe Perry	4
(England) Joe Perry	4			(England) Joe Perry	2
(England) Michael Holt	3			(Scotland) Stephen Maguire	4
(Scotland) Stephen Hendry	4	(Scotland) Stephen Hendry	3
(Scotland) Stephen Maguire	4	(Scotland) Stephen Maguire	4
(England) Andrew Higginson	0

== Century breaks ==
- 147, 133 – Ding Junhui
- 147 – Matthew Stevens
- 140, 101 – David Gray
- 139 – Xiao Guodong
- 137 – Steve Davis
- 134 – Ricky Walden
- 133, 127, 120, 113, 105, 105, 100 – Mark Allen
- 132, 111, 104 – David Gilbert
- 132 – Stuart Bingham
- 129 – Nigel Bond
- 123, 105, 101 – Marco Fu
- 121, 105 – Stephen Hendry
- 121 – Mark Davis
- 120 – Joe Swail
- 117, 102 – Andrew Higginson
- 115, 114, 111, 105 – Stephen Maguire
- 115, 106 – Mike Dunn
- 115 – Zhang Anda
- 114, 103 – Jimmy White
- 110 – Ken Doherty
- 108, 103 – Ryan Day
- 108 – Tony Drago
- 106 – Barry Hawkins
- 105, 105 – John Higgins
- 105 – David Morris
- 105 – David Grace
- 104 – Ashley Wright
- 103 – Liam Highfield
- 103 – Paul Davison
- 102 – Mark King
- 102 – Michael Holt
- 101 – Stephen Lee
- 100 – Peter Ebdon
