= European Tour 2012/2013 – Event 6 =

Betfair European Tour 2012/2013 Event 6

Tournament information
- Dates: 26–27 November 2012; 4–6 January 2013
- Venue: World Snooker Academy; Event Forum
- City: Sheffield; Fürstenfeldbruck
- Country: England; Germany
- Organisation: World Snooker
- Format: Minor-ranking event
- Total prize fund: €70,000
- Winner's share: €12,000
- Highest break: Anthony Hamilton (ENG) (141); Jamie Cope (ENG) (141); Thepchaiya Un-Nooh (THA) (141)

Final
- Champion: Mark Selby (ENG)
- Runner-up: Graeme Dott (SCO)
- Score: 4–3

The Betfair European Tour 2012/2013 – Event 6 (also known as the 2013 FFB Open and the 2013 Arcaden Munich Open) was a professional minor-ranking snooker tournament that took place over 26–27 November 2012 at the World Snooker Academy in Sheffield, England with the first three rounds and 4–6 January 2013 at the Event Forum in Fürstenfeldbruck, Germany from the last 32 onwards.

Stephen Maguire was the defending champion, but he lost 2–4 in the last 32 against Anthony Hamilton.

Mark Selby won his 10th professional title by defeating Graeme Dott 4–3 in the final.

== Prize fund and ranking points ==
The breakdown of prize money and ranking points of the event is shown below:

| | Prize fund | Ranking points^{1} |
|---|---|---|
| Winner | €12,000 | 2,000 |
| Runner-up | €6,000 | 1,600 |
| Semi-finalist | €3,000 | 1,280 |
| Quarter-finalist | €2,000 | 1,000 |
| Last 16 | €1,250 | 760 |
| Last 32 | €750 | 560 |
| Last 64 | €500 | 360 |
| Total | €70,000 | – |

- ^{1} Only professional players can earn ranking points.

== Main draw ==
=== Preliminary round ===
Best of 7 frames

| (Wales) Kishan Hirani | 2–4 | (England) Justin Astley |
| (Scotland) Ross Higgins | 4–0 | (England) Henry Roper |

| (Wales) Alex Taubman | 2–4 | (England) Adam Wicheard |
| (England) Joe Steele | 4–1 | (Scotland) Eden Sharav |

=== Main rounds ===
==== Top half ====
===== Section 1 =====
Last 128; Best of 7 frames
(England) Mark Selby | 4
(Wales) Daniel Wells | 0
(Wales) Michael White | 0
(Scotland) Scott Donaldson | 4
(Scotland) Marcus Campbell | 3
(England) Kyren Wilson | 4
(Wales) Jamie Jones | 4
(Wales) Ben Jones | 0
(England) Mark King | 4
(Poland) Kacper Filipiak | 0
(England) Rory McLeod | 4
(England) David Gilbert | 2
(England) Craig Steadman | 3
(England) Michael Wasley | 4
(Hong Kong) Marco Fu | 4
(England) Sean O'Sullivan | 1

Last 64; Best of 7 frames
(England) Mark Selby | 4
(Scotland) Scott Donaldson | 0
(England) Kyren Wilson | 4
(Wales) Jamie Jones | 3
(England) Mark King | 4
(England) Rory McLeod | 2
(England) Michael Wasley | 4
(Hong Kong) Marco Fu | 3

Last 32; Best of 7 frames
(England) Mark Selby | 4
(England) Kyren Wilson | 1
(England) Mark King | 4
(England) Michael Wasley | 1

Last 16; Best of 7 frames
(England) Mark Selby | 4
(England) Mark King | 0

===== Section 2 =====
Last 128; Best of 7 frames
(England) Ricky Walden | 4
(England) Christopher Keogan | 1
(England) Jamie Cope | 2
(England) Sam Baird | 4
(England) Joe Perry | 1
(Thailand) Thanawat Thirapongpaiboon | 4
(Republic of Ireland) Fergal O'Brien | 2
(England) Joel Walker | 4
(China) Liang Wenbo | 4
(England) Neal Jones | 0
(China) Ding Junhui | 4
(China) Cao Yupeng | 2
(England) Andrew Norman | 1
(England) Justin Astley | 4
(England) Stuart Bingham | 4
(China) Zhang Anda | 1

Last 64; Best of 7 frames
(England) Ricky Walden | 4
(England) Sam Baird | 0
(Thailand) Thanawat Thirapongpaiboon | 4
(England) Joel Walker | 2
(China) Liang Wenbo | 4
(China) Ding Junhui | 2
(England) Justin Astley | 4
(England) Stuart Bingham | 3

Last 32; Best of 7 frames
(England) Ricky Walden | 1
(Thailand) Thanawat Thirapongpaiboon | 4
(China) Liang Wenbo | 4
(England) Justin Astley | 2

Last 16; Best of 7 frames
(Thailand) Thanawat Thirapongpaiboon | 4
(China) Liang Wenbo | 3

===== Section 3 =====
Last 128; Best of 7 frames
(England) John Astley | 4
(Thailand) Passakorn Suwannawat | 3
(China) Tian Pengfei | 4
(England) Matthew Hudson | 0
(Scotland) Jamie Burnett | 4
(England) Zak Surety | 2
(England) Allan Taylor | 4
(England) Hassan Miah | 0
(England) Mark Davis | 4
(England) Peter Ebdon | 0
(England) Shaun Murphy | 4
(China) Chen Zhe | 0
(England) Simon Bedford | 3
(China) Liu Chuang | 4
(China) Xiao Guodong | 4
(England) Oliver Lines | 0

Last 64; Best of 7 frames
(England) John Astley | 3
(China) Tian Pengfei | 4
(Scotland) Jamie Burnett | 4
(England) Allan Taylor | 2
(England) Mark Davis | 4
(England) Shaun Murphy | 1
(China) Liu Chuang | 4
(China) Xiao Guodong | 2

Last 32; Best of 7 frames
(China) Tian Pengfei | 4
(Scotland) Jamie Burnett | 0
(England) Mark Davis | 4
(China) Liu Chuang | 1

Last 16; Best of 7 frames
(China) Tian Pengfei | 4
(England) Mark Davis | 1

===== Section 4 =====
Last 128; Best of 7 frames
(China) Yu Delu | 4
(Denmark) Daniel Kandi | 1
(England) Jimmy Robertson | 4
(Scotland) Ross Higgins | 0
(England) Dave Harold | 4
(England) Greg Davis | 0
(England) Michael Holt | 4
(England) Liam Monk | 1
(England) Robert Milkins | 4
(Scotland) Michael Leslie | 0
(England) Tom Ford | 3
(England) Nigel Bond | 4
(England) Martin Gould | 4
(England) Ryan Causton | 1
(Scotland) Anthony McGill | 4
(India) Varun Madan | 1

Last 64; Best of 7 frames
(China) Yu Delu | 2
(England) Jimmy Robertson | 4
(England) Dave Harold | 4
(England) Michael Holt | 3
(England) Robert Milkins | 4
(England) Nigel Bond | 2
(England) Martin Gould | 4
(Scotland) Anthony McGill | 0

Last 32; Best of 7 frames
(England) Jimmy Robertson | 3
(England) Dave Harold | 4
(England) Robert Milkins | 3
(England) Martin Gould | 4

Last 16; Best of 7 frames
(England) Dave Harold | 0
(England) Martin Gould | 4

==== Bottom half ====
===== Section 5 =====
Last 128; Best of 7 frames
(Australia) Neil Robertson | 4
(England) Sam Craigie | 0
(Northern Ireland) Joe Swail | 4
(Wales) Jak Jones | 3
(Norway) Kurt Maflin | 4
(England) Ricky Norris | 0
(England) Jimmy White | 4
(England) Jamie O'Neill | 2
(England) Andrew Higginson | 4
(England) Nico Elton | 1
(Wales) Dominic Dale | 4
(England) Mitchell Mann | 0
(Malta) Tony Drago | 4
(England) Matthew Selt | 2
(China) Li Yan | 3
(England) Liam Highfield | 4

Last 64; Best of 7 frames
(Australia) Neil Robertson | 4
(Northern Ireland) Joe Swail | 2
(Norway) Kurt Maflin | 4
(England) Jimmy White | 1
(England) Andrew Higginson | 2
(Wales) Dominic Dale | 4
(Malta) Tony Drago | 2
(England) Liam Highfield | 4

Last 32; Best of 7 frames
(Australia) Neil Robertson | 3
(Norway) Kurt Maflin | 4
(Wales) Dominic Dale | 2
(England) Liam Highfield | 4

Last 16; Best of 7 frames
(Norway) Kurt Maflin | 4
(England) Liam Highfield | 1

===== Section 6 =====
Last 128; Best of 7 frames
(England) Ali Carter | 4
(England) Mike Dunn | 0
(Scotland) Alan McManus | 4
(England) James Cahill | 0
(England) Jack Lisowski | 4
(England) Matthew Couch | 1
(England) David Grace | 3
(England) Ashley Carty | 4
(Republic of Ireland) Ken Doherty | 4
(England) Michael Wild | 3
(Wales) Andrew Pagett | 1
(England) Adam Wicheard | 4
(England) Alfie Burden | 4
(England) Jamie Gibson | 0
(England) Rod Lawler | 4
(England) Chris Norbury | 2

Last 64; Best of 7 frames
(England) Ali Carter | 1
(Scotland) Alan McManus | 4
(England) Jack Lisowski | 4
(England) Ashley Carty | 2
(Republic of Ireland) Ken Doherty | 4
(England) Adam Wicheard | 1
(England) Alfie Burden | 1
(England) Rod Lawler | 4

Last 32; Best of 7 frames
(Scotland) Alan McManus | 3
(England) Jack Lisowski | 4
(Republic of Ireland) Ken Doherty | w/d
(England) Rod Lawler | w/o

Last 16; Best of 7 frames
(England) Jack Lisowski | 1
(England) Rod Lawler | 4

===== Section 7 =====
Last 128; Best of 7 frames
(Thailand) Thepchaiya Un-Nooh | 4
(England) Reanne Evans | 2
(Wales) Ryan Day | 4
(Thailand) James Wattana | 0
(England) Ian Burns | 4
(England) Phil O'Kane | 0
(Belgium) Luca Brecel | 4
(England) John Whitty | 1
(Thailand) Dechawat Poomjaeng | 4
(Northern Ireland) Gerard Greene | 0
(England) Steve Davis | 2
(India) Aditya Mehta | 4
(Scotland) Graeme Dott | 4
(England) Joe Steele | 1
(England) Paul Davison | 4
(Scotland) Marc Davis | 1

Last 64; Best of 7 frames
(Thailand) Thepchaiya Un-Nooh | 4
(Wales) Ryan Day | 3
(England) Ian Burns | 4
(Belgium) Luca Brecel | 1
(Thailand) Dechawat Poomjaeng | 1
(India) Aditya Mehta | 4
(Scotland) Graeme Dott | 4
(England) Paul Davison | 3

Last 32; Best of 7 frames
(Thailand) Thepchaiya Un-Nooh | 1
(England) Ian Burns | 4
(India) Aditya Mehta | 2
(Scotland) Graeme Dott | 4

Last 16; Best of 7 frames
(England) Ian Burns | 3
(Scotland) Graeme Dott | 4

===== Section 8 =====
Last 128; Best of 7 frames
(England) Robbie Williams | 4
(England) Matthew Day | 0
(England) Ben Woollaston | 4
(Scotland) Shahbaz Hameed | 0
(India) Pankaj Advani | 4
(England) Martin O'Donnell | 1
(Wales) Matthew Stevens | 4
(England) Barry Pinches | 0
(England) Anthony Hamilton | 4
(Australia) Ben Judge | 1
(England) Barry Hawkins | 1
(England) Adam Duffy | 4
(England) Mark Joyce | 4
(India) Lucky Vatnani | 0
(Scotland) Stephen Maguire | 4
(England) Peter Lines | 1

Last 64; Best of 7 frames
(England) Robbie Williams | 1
(England) Ben Woollaston | 4
(India) Pankaj Advani | 3
(Wales) Matthew Stevens | 4
(England) Anthony Hamilton | 4
(England) Adam Duffy | 2
(England) Mark Joyce | 0
(Scotland) Stephen Maguire | 4

Last 32; Best of 7 frames
(England) Ben Woollaston | 4
(Wales) Matthew Stevens | 0
(England) Anthony Hamilton | 4
(Scotland) Stephen Maguire | 2

Last 16; Best of 7 frames
(England) Ben Woollaston | 4
(England) Anthony Hamilton | 2

==== Finals ====
| Quarter-finals; Best of 7 frames | | Semi-finals; Best of 7 frames | | Final; Best of 7 frames |
| (England) Mark Selby | 4 |
| (Thailand) Thanawat Thirapongpaiboon | 0 | (England) Mark Selby | 4 |
| (China) Tian Pengfei | 4 | (China) Tian Pengfei | 2 |
| (England) Martin Gould | 2 | | | (England) Mark Selby | 4 |
| (Norway) Kurt Maflin | 3 | | | (Scotland) Graeme Dott | 3 |
| (England) Rod Lawler | 4 | (England) Rod Lawler | 0 |
| (Scotland) Graeme Dott | 4 | (Scotland) Graeme Dott | 4 |
| (England) Ben Woollaston | 3 |

== Century breaks ==
- 141, 101 – Anthony Hamilton
- 141 – Jamie Cope
- 141 – Thepchaiya Un-Nooh
- 140 – Thanawat Thirapongpaiboon
- 139 – Dominic Dale
- 137, 124, 106 – Mark Selby
- 134 – Ryan Day
- 129 – Neil Robertson
- 128, 118, 105 – Ben Woollaston
- 123, 117 – Jack Lisowski
- 122 – Mark King
- 120 – Martin Gould
- 117 – Matthew Stevens
- 117 – Aditya Mehta
- 116 – Alan McManus
- 115, 106, 102 – Graeme Dott
- 113, 101 – Rod Lawler
- 113 – Ian Burns
- 113 – Jimmy White
- 117 – Fergal O'Brien
- 110, 109 – Tian Pengfei
- 110 – Joel Walker
- 109 – Allan Taylor
- 109 – Liu Chuang
- 108 – Liang Wenbo
- 108 – Mark Joyce
- 108 – Stephen Maguire
- 107 – Stuart Bingham
- 106, 105, 103 – Marco Fu
- 106, 105 – Xiao Guodong
- 106 – Mark Davis
- 105 – Joe Swail
- 103 – Paul Davison
- 102, 100 – Luca Brecel
- 101 – Joe Perry
- 100 – Jamie Burnett
- 100 – Ricky Walden
- 100 – Kyren Wilson
- 101 – Liam Monk
