= 2012 Welsh Open (snooker) =

2012 888真人 Welsh Open

Tournament information
- Dates: 13–19 February 2012
- Venue: Newport Centre
- City: Newport
- Country: Wales
- Organisation: World Snooker
- Format: Ranking event
- Total prize fund: £201,500
- Winner's share: £30,000
- Highest break: Mark Selby (ENG) (145)

Final
- Champion: Ding Junhui (CHN)
- Runner-up: Mark Selby (ENG)
- Score: 9–6

The 2012 Welsh Open (officially the 2012 888真人 Welsh Open) was a professional ranking snooker tournament that took place between 13 and 19 February 2012 at the Newport Centre in Newport, Wales. This was the first time, that 888真人 sponsored the event.

John Higgins was the defending champion, but he lost 3–4 against Ding Junhui in the last 16.

Ding Junhui won his fifth ranking title by defeating Mark Selby 9–6 in the final.

== Prize fund ==
The breakdown of prize money for this year is shown below:

- Winner: £30,000
- Runner-up: £15,000
- Semi-final: £7,500
- Quarter-final: £5,600
- Last 16: £4,000
- Last 32: £2,500
- Last 48: £1,600
- Last 64: £1,250
- Stage one highest break: £500
- Stage two highest break: £1,000
- Total: £201,500

== Main draw ==
Last 32; Best of 7 frames
1	(Scotland) John Higgins	4
(China) Liang Wenbo	1
9	(China) Ding Junhui	4
(England) Mark Davis	0
15	(England) Stephen Lee	4
(England) Michael Holt	1
7	(Scotland) Graeme Dott	2
(England) Tom Ford	4
6	(England) Shaun Murphy	4
(England) Mark Joyce	2
11	(England) Ali Carter	3
(England) Steve Davis	4
10	(Northern Ireland) Mark Allen	4
(Republic of Ireland) Ken Doherty	0
4	(Australia) Neil Robertson	1
(Scotland) Stephen Hendry	4
3	(Wales) Mark Williams	4
(England) Andy Hicks	3
16	(England) Ronnie O'Sullivan	4
(Hong Kong) Marco Fu	1
14	(England) Stuart Bingham	4
(England) Mark King	2
5	(England) Judd Trump	4
(Republic of Ireland) Fergal O'Brien	0
8	(Scotland) Stephen Maguire	4
(England) Adam Wicheard	2
13	(Wales) Matthew Stevens	4
(England) Barry Hawkins	3
12	(England) Martin Gould	4
(England) Peter Ebdon	2
2	(England) Mark Selby	4
(England) Sam Baird	3

Last 16; Best of 7 frames
1	(Scotland) John Higgins	3
9	(China) Ding Junhui	4
15	(England) Stephen Lee	4
(England) Tom Ford	1
6	(England) Shaun Murphy	4
(England) Steve Davis	0
10	(Northern Ireland) Mark Allen	4
(Scotland) Stephen Hendry	0
3	(Wales) Mark Williams	1
16	(England) Ronnie O'Sullivan	4
14	(England) Stuart Bingham	1
5	(England) Judd Trump	4
8	(Scotland) Stephen Maguire	4
13	(Wales) Matthew Stevens	2
12	(England) Martin Gould	1
2	(England) Mark Selby	4

Quarter-finals; Best of 9 frames
9	(China) Ding Junhui	5
15	(England) Stephen Lee	4
6	(England) Shaun Murphy	5
10	(Northern Ireland) Mark Allen	4
16	(England) Ronnie O'Sullivan	5
5	(England) Judd Trump	3
8	(Scotland) Stephen Maguire	3
2	(England) Mark Selby	5

Semi-finals; Best of 11 frames
9	(China) Ding Junhui	6
6	(England) Shaun Murphy	2
16	(England) Ronnie O'Sullivan	2
2	(England) Mark Selby	6

Final; Best of 17 frames
9	(China) Ding Junhui	9
2	(England) Mark Selby	6

== Final ==
Final: Best of 17 frames. Referee: Terry Camilleri. Newport Centre, Newport, Wales, 19 February 2012.
Ding Junhui (9); China	9–6	Mark Selby (2); England
Afternoon: 1–136 (103), 71–8 (64), 0–124 (124), 64–61, 66–40, 90–0 (90), 0–91 (66), 64–29 (51); Evening: 14–80 (73), 84–2 (83), 34–91 (91), 124–3 (124), 130–0 (130), 0–145 (145), 74–11
130	Highest break	145
2	Century breaks	3
6	50+ breaks	6

== Qualifying ==
These matches were held between 8 and 11 February 2012 at the World Snooker Academy, Sheffield, England.

Round 1 Best of 7 frames
(China) Tian Pengfei	0
(China) Cao Yupeng	4
(England) David Grace	3
(Wales) Daniel Wells	4
(England) Sam Craigie	2
(India) Lucky Vatnani	4
(Norway) Kurt Maflin	4
(England) Stuart Carrington	3
(England) Andrew Norman	4
(India) Aditya Mehta	0
(Republic of Ireland) David Morris	4
(England) Paul Davison	3
(Wales) Andrew Pagett	1
(England) Adam Wicheard	4
(China) Yu Delu	4
(Belgium) Luca Brecel	0
(England) Adam Duffy	w/o
(Thailand) Dechawat Poomjaeng	w/d
(Thailand) Passakorn Suwannawat	1
(England) Sam Baird	4

Round 2 Best of 7 frames
(England) Ben Woollaston	1
(England) David Gilbert	4
(England) Adrian Gunnell	2
(China) Cao Yupeng	4
(England) Jimmy Robertson	2
(England) Alfie Burden	4
(Wales) Michael White	1
(England) Ian McCulloch	4
(England) Mark Joyce	4
(Wales) Daniel Wells	3
(England) Barry Pinches	1
(India) Lucky Vatnani	4
(England) Peter Lines	2
(England) Rod Lawler	4
(Malta) Tony Drago	2
(Norway) Kurt Maflin	4
(England) Andy Hicks	4
(England) Andrew Norman	2
(China) Liu Chuang	4
(England) Liam Highfield	3
(England) Dave Harold	4
(Northern Ireland) Joe Swail	0
(China) Xiao Guodong	4
(Republic of Ireland) David Morris	2
(China) Liu Song	3
(England) Adam Wicheard	4
(Scotland) Anthony McGill	4
(China) Yu Delu	2
(Thailand) James Wattana	0
(England) Adam Duffy	4
(China) Li Yan	1
(England) Sam Baird	4

Round 3 Best of 7 frames
(China) Liang Wenbo	4
(England) David Gilbert	1
(Scotland) Jamie Burnett	4
(China) Cao Yupeng	2
(England) Michael Holt	4
(England) Alfie Burden	3
(England) Jimmy White	2
(England) Ian McCulloch	4
(England) Joe Jogia	0
(England) Mark Joyce	4
(England) Steve Davis	4
(India) Lucky Vatnani	3
(Republic of Ireland) Ken Doherty	4
(England) Rod Lawler	0
(England) Robert Milkins	0
(Norway) Kurt Maflin	4
(England) Anthony Hamilton	1
(England) Andy Hicks	4
(England) Matthew Selt	4
(China) Liu Chuang	1
(Scotland) Alan McManus	3
(England) Dave Harold	4
(England) Mike Dunn	4
(China) Xiao Guodong	3
(Wales) Jamie Jones	1
(England) Adam Wicheard	4
(Northern Ireland) Gerard Greene	4
(Scotland) Anthony McGill	2
(England) Jack Lisowski	2
(England) Adam Duffy	4
(England) Nigel Bond	3
(England) Sam Baird	4

Round 4 Best of 7 frames
(England) Rory McLeod	1
(China) Liang Wenbo	4
(England) Mark Davis	4
(Scotland) Jamie Burnett	2
(Wales) Ryan Day (Note: Matches were held over and played in Newport.)	0
(England) Michael Holt	4
(England) Tom Ford	4
(England) Ian McCulloch	3
(England) Andrew Higginson	3
(England) Mark Joyce	4
(England) Ricky Walden	3
(England) Steve Davis	4
(England) Jamie Cope	2
(Republic of Ireland) Ken Doherty	4
(Scotland) Stephen Hendry	4
(Norway) Kurt Maflin	0
(England) Joe Perry	2
(England) Andy Hicks	4
(Hong Kong) Marco Fu	4
(England) Matthew Selt	2
(England) Mark King	4
(England) Dave Harold	1
(Republic of Ireland) Fergal O'Brien	4
(England) Mike Dunn	3
(Scotland) Marcus Campbell	2
(England) Adam Wicheard	4
(England) Barry Hawkins	4
(Northern Ireland) Gerard Greene	2
(England) Peter Ebdon	4
(England) Adam Duffy	0
(Wales) Dominic Dale	2
(England) Sam Baird	4

== Century breaks ==
=== Qualifying stage centuries ===
- 142, 113, 111 – Andy Hicks
- 141, 116, 100 – Sam Baird
- 138 – Stuart Carrington
- 137 – Paul Davison
- 135 – Kurt Maflin
- 134, 112 – David Morris
- 134 – Tom Ford
- 128 – Yu Delu
- 126 – Adam Duffy
- 123, 120, 104 – Xiao Guodong
- 122, 101 – Barry Hawkins
- 113 – Gerard Greene
- 113 – Steve Davis
- 112, 109 – David Gilbert
- 112 – Liu Chuang
- 111 – Mike Dunn
- 108, 106 – Ian McCulloch
- 106 – Tony Drago
- 102 – Marco Fu

=== Televised stage centuries ===
- 145, 124, 110, 103 – Mark Selby
- 141 – Matthew Stevens
- 139, 125, 102, 101 – Ronnie O'Sullivan
- 136 – Sam Baird
- 135 – Neil Robertson
- 133 – Mark Williams
- 131, 111, 101 – Stephen Maguire
- 130, 124 – Ding Junhui
- 129 – Stephen Lee
- 126 – Shaun Murphy
- 123 – Barry Hawkins
- 121, 117 – Steve Davis
- 121 – Mark Allen
- 109, 104, 100 – Judd Trump
