= European Tour 2012/2013 – Event 5 =

Betfair European Tour 2012/2013 Event 5

Tournament information
- Dates: 13–16 December 2012
- Venue: Ravenscraig Regional Sports Facility
- City: Ravenscraig
- Country: Scotland
- Organisation: World Snooker
- Format: Minor-ranking event
- Total prize fund: €70,616
- Winner's share: €12,000
- Highest break: Kurt Maflin (NOR) (147)

Final
- Champion: Ding Junhui (CHN)
- Runner-up: Anthony McGill (SCO)
- Score: 4–2

The European Tour 2012/2013 – Event 5 (also known as the 2012 Grant Property Investment.com Scottish Open) was a professional minor-ranking snooker tournament that took place between 13 and 16 December 2012 at the Ravenscraig Sports Facility in Ravenscraig, Scotland. This was the first World Snooker event in Scotland since the 2010 World Open. The event was the fifth of the European Tour 2012/2013

The Scottish Open was last held in 2004, under the Players Championship name. Jimmy White defeated Paul Hunter 9–7 in the final. China's Ding Junhui won the 10th professional title of his career by defeating Scot Anthony McGill 4–2 in the final.

Kurt Maflin made the 96th official maximum break during his last 32 match against Stuart Carrington. This was Maflin's second 147 break and the eighth in the 2012/2013 season.

== Prize fund ==
The breakdown of prize money and ranking points of the event is shown below:

	Prize fund	Ranking points^{1}
Winner	€12,000	2,000
Runner-up	€6,000	1,600
Semi-finalist	€3,000	1,280
Quarter-finalist	€2,000	1,000
Last 16	€1,250	760
Last 32	€750	560
Last 64	€500	360
Maximum break	€616	–
Total	€70,616	–

- ^{1} Only professional players can earn ranking points.

== Main draw ==
The following is the results from the event. Players in bold denote match winners.

=== Preliminary rounds ===
==== Round 1 ====
Best of 7 frames

(Scotland) Ross Higgins	0–**4**	(England) **Chris Norbury**
(Scotland) **Mark Boyle**	**4**–0	(England) Andy Guest
(Scotland) Lance Little	2–**4**	(Wales) **Jak Jones**
(England) **Jamie Gibson**	**4**–1	(Scotland) Christopher Giffney
(England) Scott Whiteley	3–**4**	(Scotland) **Lloyd Condron**

(Scotland) **Michael Collumb**	**4**–0	(Scotland) Stephen Baillie
(Scotland) **Eden Sharav**	**4**–3	(Scotland) Dylan Craig
(England) **Darrell Whitworth**	**4**–0	(Scotland) William Thomson
(Scotland) **Rhys Clark**	**w/o**–w/d	(England) Liam Monk

==== Round 2 ====
Best of 7 frames

(Belgium) Hans Blanckaert	w/d–**w/o**	(England) **James Cahill**
(Scotland) George Cunningham	1–**4**	(India) **Lucky Vatnani**
(Scotland) **Joseph McLaren**	**4**–3	(Scotland) Barry Lee
(Scotland) Marc Davis	2–**4**	(England) **Ashley Carty**
(Wales) **Ben Jones**	**4**–0	(England) George Scott
(England) **Ian Glover**	**4**–3	(England) Christopher Keogan
(Scotland) Scott Gillespie	0–**4**	(England) **Chris Norbury**
(England) **Andrew Milliard**	**4**–1	(Scotland) Barry Campbell
(England) Matthew Day	1–**4**	(England) **Adam Wicheard**
(England) **Oliver Lines**	**4**–1	(England) Oliver Brown
(Scotland) Bobby Cruickshanks	2–**4**	(Scotland) **Mark Boyle**
(England) **Darren Bond**	**4**–3	(Wales) Jak Jones
(England) Terry Challenger	w/d–**w/o**	(Poland) **Kacper Filipiak**
(England) Ryan Causton	1–**4**	(Wales) **Gareth Allen**
(England) **Stuart Carrington**	**4**–1	(England) Jamie Gibson
(Germany) **Phil Barnes**	**4**–0	(Wales) Kishan Hirani
(Finland) Robin Hull	w/d–**w/o**	(England) **Kyren Wilson**

(England) **Sam Harvey**	**4**–2	(England) James Silverwood
(England) Jamie Barrett	3–**4**	(England) **Justin Astley**
(England) Dean Goddard	w/d–**w/o**	(England) **John Parkin**
(England) Garry Steele	0–**4**	(Scotland) **Fraser Patrick**
(England) **Lee Page**	**4**–0	(Scotland) Lloyd Condron
(Scotland) Thomas McSorley	3–**4**	(England) **Jake Nicholson**
(England) Hassan Miah	w/d–**w/o**	(England) **Sanderson Lam**
(Scotland) **Ross Muir**	**4**–1	(Scotland) Michael Collumb
(Scotland) Chris Totten	0–**4**	(England) **Mitchell Mann**
(Malta) Aaron Busuttil	w/d–**w/o**	(Wales) **Jack Bradford**
(England) **James Gillespie**	**4**–1	(Scotland) Pat McKinney
(Scotland) Sean James Riach	1–**4**	(Scotland) **Eden Sharav**
(England) **Michael Wild**	**4**–2	(England) Darrell Whitworth
(Wales) Callum Lloyd	3–**4**	(Scotland) **Rhys Clark**
(England) Ricky Norris	1–**4**	(England) **Ben Harrison**
(England) **Mark Vincent**	**4**–1	(England) Joe Steele
(England) Reanne Evans	3–**4**	(Northern Ireland) **Jordan Brown**

=== Main rounds ===
==== Top half ====
===== Section 1 =====
Last 128; Best of 7 frames
(England) **Mark Selby**	**w/o**
(England) Jamie O'Neill	w/d
(Thailand) Thepchaiya Un-Nooh	3
(Thailand) **Thanawat Thirapongpaiboon**	**4**
(England) Paul Davison	2
(England) **James Cahill**	**4**
(England) Jimmy White	2
(China) **Liu Chuang**	**4**
(Scotland) **Alan McManus**	**4**
(India) Lucky Vatnani	1
(England) **Robbie Williams**	**4**
(Scotland) Joseph McLaren	1
(England) **Barry Hawkins**	**4**
(England) Ashley Carty	1
(England) **Andrew Norman**	**4**
(Wales) Ben Jones	3

Last 64; Best of 7 frames
(England) Mark Selby	w/d
(Thailand) **Thanawat Thirapongpaiboon**	**w/o**
(England) James Cahill	2
(China) **Liu Chuang**	**4**
(Scotland) Alan McManus	2
(England) **Robbie Williams**	**4**
(England) **Barry Hawkins**	**4**
(England) Andrew Norman	1

Last 32; Best of 7 frames
(Thailand) **Thanawat Thirapongpaiboon**	**4**
(China) Liu Chuang	0
(England) Robbie Williams	0
(England) **Barry Hawkins**	**4**

Last 16; Best of 7 frames
(Thailand) **Thanawat Thirapongpaiboon**	**4**
(England) Barry Hawkins	3

===== Section 2 =====
Last 128; Best of 7 frames
(England) Jamie Cope	3
(Scotland) **Scott Donaldson**	**4**
(Malta) Tony Drago	2
(England) **Nigel Bond**	**4**
(England) **John Astley**	**4**
(England) Ian Glover	3
(Scotland) **Jamie Burnett**	**4**
(England) Chris Norbury	3
(England) **Mark Davis**	**4**
(England) Andrew Milliard	0
(Scotland) **Anthony McGill**	**4**
(England) Michael Wasley	0
(England) **Robert Milkins**	**4**
(China) Zhang Anda	2
(India) **Pankaj Advani**	**4**
(Northern Ireland) Gerard Greene	3

Last 64; Best of 7 frames
(Scotland) Scott Donaldson	3
(England) **Nigel Bond**	**4**
(England) **John Astley**	**4**
(Scotland) Jamie Burnett	1
(England) Mark Davis	3
(Scotland) **Anthony McGill**	**4**
(England) **Robert Milkins**	**4**
(India) Pankaj Advani	1

Last 32; Best of 7 frames
(England) **Nigel Bond**	**4**
(England) John Astley	0
(Scotland) **Anthony McGill**	**4**
(England) Robert Milkins	0

Last 16; Best of 7 frames
(England) Nigel Bond	1
(Scotland) **Anthony McGill**	**4**

===== Section 3 =====
Last 128; Best of 7 frames
(England) Mark King	2
(England) **Adam Wicheard**	**4**
(England) **Jimmy Robertson**	**4**
(England) Oliver Lines	2
(England) **Rory McLeod**	**4**
(China) Cao Yupeng	0
(England) Ricky Walden	3
(China) **Xiao Guodong**	**4**
(England) **Andrew Higginson**	**4**
(England) Mike Dunn	1
(England) **Tom Ford**	**4**
(Scotland) Mark Boyle	3
(Scotland) **Graeme Dott**	**4**
(Wales) Daniel Wells	2
(England) **Ben Woollaston**	**4**
(England) Darren Bond	1

Last 64; Best of 7 frames
(England) Adam Wicheard	2
(England) **Jimmy Robertson**	**4**
(England) Rory McLeod	2
(China) **Xiao Guodong**	**4**
(England) **Andrew Higginson**	**4**
(England) Tom Ford	0
(Scotland) Graeme Dott	2
(England) **Ben Woollaston**	**4**

Last 32; Best of 7 frames
(England) **Jimmy Robertson**	**4**
(China) Xiao Guodong	3
(England) **Andrew Higginson**	**4**
(England) Ben Woollaston	1

Last 16; Best of 7 frames
(England) Jimmy Robertson	1
(England) **Andrew Higginson**	**4**

===== Section 4 =====
Last 128; Best of 7 frames
(England) **Martin Gould**	**4**
(Poland) Kacper Filipiak	0
(Norway) **Kurt Maflin**	**4**
(Wales) Gareth Allen	0
(Thailand) **Dechawat Poomjaeng**	**4**
(England) Simon Bedford	3
(England) Michael Holt	1
(England) **Stuart Carrington**	**4**
(England) Jack Lisowski	3
(England) **Sean O'Sullivan**	**4**
(Wales) Matthew Stevens	w/d
(England) **Martin O'Donnell**	**w/o**
(Australia) Neil Robertson	w/d
(Germany) **Phil Barnes**	**w/o**
(England) **Craig Steadman**	**4**
(England) Kyren Wilson	3

Last 64; Best of 7 frames
(England) Martin Gould	2
(Norway) **Kurt Maflin**	**4**
(Thailand) Dechawat Poomjaeng	2
(England) **Stuart Carrington**	**4**
(England) Sean O'Sullivan	3
(England) **Martin O'Donnell**	**4**
(Germany) Phil Barnes	0
(England) **Craig Steadman**	**4**

Last 32; Best of 7 frames
(Norway) **Kurt Maflin**	**4**
(England) Stuart Carrington	1
(England) **Martin O'Donnell**	**4**
(England) Craig Steadman	3

Last 16; Best of 7 frames
(Norway) Kurt Maflin	3
(England) **Martin O'Donnell**	**4**

==== Bottom half ====
===== Section 5 =====
Last 128; Best of 7 frames
(Scotland) **Stephen Maguire**	**4**
(England) Peter Lines	1
(England) David Grace	0
(England) **David Gilbert**	**4**
(England) **Steve Davis**	**4**
(England) Sam Harvey	1
(China) Yu Delu	0
(England) **Liam Highfield**	**4**
(China) **Ding Junhui**	**4**
(Scotland) Michael Leslie	0
(Wales) **Mark Williams**	**4**
(England) Adam Duffy	2
(England) **Joe Perry**	**4**
(China) Chen Zhe	0
(Wales) **Dominic Dale**	**4**
(Thailand) Passakorn Suwannawat	2

Last 64; Best of 7 frames
(Scotland) **Stephen Maguire**	**4**
(England) David Gilbert	2
(England) **Steve Davis**	**4**
(England) Liam Highfield	2
(China) **Ding Junhui**	**4**
(Wales) Mark Williams	3
(England) Joe Perry	1
(Wales) **Dominic Dale**	**4**

Last 32; Best of 7 frames
(Scotland) Stephen Maguire	2
(England) **Steve Davis**	**4**
(China) **Ding Junhui**	**4**
(Wales) Dominic Dale	1

Last 16; Best of 7 frames
(England) Steve Davis	1
(China) **Ding Junhui**	**4**

===== Section 6 =====
Last 128; Best of 7 frames
(England) **Ian Burns**	**4**
(England) Justin Astley	0
(England) **Alfie Burden**	**4**
(England) John Parkin	0
(Scotland) **Marcus Campbell**	**4**
(Scotland) Fraser Patrick	3
(England) **Shaun Murphy**	**4**
(England) Lee Page	1
(England) **Stuart Bingham**	**4**
(England) Jake Nicholson	1
(Wales) Andrew Pagett	1
(England) **Joel Walker**	**4**
(England) Rod Lawler	2
(England) **Barry Pinches**	**4**
(China) **Liang Wenbo**	**4**
(England) Peter Ebdon	2

Last 64; Best of 7 frames
(England) **Ian Burns**	**4**
(England) Alfie Burden	2
(Scotland) **Marcus Campbell**	**4**
(England) Shaun Murphy	3
(England) Stuart Bingham	3
(England) **Joel Walker**	**4**
(England) Barry Pinches	1
(China) **Liang Wenbo**	**4**

Last 32; Best of 7 frames
(England) **Ian Burns**	**4**
(Scotland) Marcus Campbell	2
(England) Joel Walker	2
(China) **Liang Wenbo**	**4**

Last 16; Best of 7 frames
(England) **Ian Burns**	**4**
(China) Liang Wenbo	2

===== Section 7 =====
Last 128; Best of 7 frames
(England) **Mark Joyce**	**4**
(India) Aditya Mehta	3
(Northern Ireland) **Mark Allen**	**4**
(England) Sanderson Lam	1
(England) **Allan Taylor**	**4**
(Scotland) Ross Muir	1
(Republic of Ireland) **Fergal O'Brien**	**4**
(England) Matthew Selt	3
(Wales) Michael White	3
(England) **Mitchell Mann**	**4**
(England) **Dave Harold**	**4**
(England) Sam Baird	1
(England) **Gary Wilson**	**4**
(China) Li Yan	1
(England) Ali Carter	w/d
(Wales) **Jack Bradford**	**w/o**

Last 64; Best of 7 frames
(England) **Mark Joyce**	**4**
(Northern Ireland) Mark Allen	3
(England) **Allan Taylor**	**4**
(Republic of Ireland) Fergal O'Brien	3
(England) Mitchell Mann	3
(England) **Dave Harold**	**4**
(England) **Gary Wilson**	**4**
(Wales) Jack Bradford	0

Last 32; Best of 7 frames
(England) **Mark Joyce**	**4**
(England) Allan Taylor	3
(England) Dave Harold	0
(England) **Gary Wilson**	**4**

Last 16; Best of 7 frames
(England) **Mark Joyce**	**4**
(England) Gary Wilson	3

===== Section 8 =====
Last 128; Best of 7 frames
(China) **Tian Pengfei**	**4**
(Thailand) James Wattana	2
(Belgium) **Luca Brecel**	**4**
(England) James Gillespie	0
(Northern Ireland) **Joe Swail**	**4**
(Scotland) Eden Sharav	0
(Republic of Ireland) **Ken Doherty**	**4**
(England) Michael Wild	3
(England) **Anthony Hamilton**	**4**
(Scotland) Rhys Clark	0
(Wales) **Ryan Day**	**4**
(England) Ben Harrison	1
(Wales) Jamie Jones	w/d
(England) **Mark Vincent**	**w/o**
(Scotland) John Higgins	3
(Northern Ireland) **Jordan Brown**	**4**

Last 64; Best of 7 frames
(China) Tian Pengfei	2
(Belgium) **Luca Brecel**	**4**
(Northern Ireland) Joe Swail	1
(Republic of Ireland) **Ken Doherty**	**4**
(England) Anthony Hamilton	1
(Wales) **Ryan Day**	**4**
(England) Mark Vincent	0
(Northern Ireland) **Jordan Brown**	**4**

Last 32; Best of 7 frames
(Belgium) Luca Brecel	1
(Republic of Ireland) **Ken Doherty**	**4**
(Wales) **Ryan Day**	**4**
(Northern Ireland) Jordan Brown	2

Last 16; Best of 7 frames
(Republic of Ireland) **Ken Doherty**	**4**
(Wales) Ryan Day	2

==== Finals ====
Quarter-finals; Best of 7 frames		Semi-finals; Best of 7 frames		Final; Best of 7 frames
(Thailand) Thanawat Thirapongpaiboon	3
(Scotland) **Anthony McGill**	**4**	(Scotland) **Anthony McGill**	**4**
(England) **Andrew Higginson**	**4**	(England) Andrew Higginson	3
(England) Martin O'Donnell	2			(Scotland) Anthony McGill	2
(China) **Ding Junhui**	**4**			(China) **Ding Junhui**	**4**
(England) Ian Burns	1	(China) **Ding Junhui**	**4**
(England) Mark Joyce	2	(Republic of Ireland) Ken Doherty	2
(Republic of Ireland) **Ken Doherty**	**4**

== Century breaks ==
A total of 35 century breaks were made during the tournament.

- 147, 135 – Kurt Maflin
- 139, 138, 120, 107, 105, 103, 100 – Ding Junhui
- 137, 137 – Fergal O'Brien
- 135, 112 – Gary Wilson
- 134 – Ryan Day
- 124, 122, 109 – Stuart Bingham
- 124, 101 – Ken Doherty
- 120, 107 – Luca Brecel
- 114 – Joe Perry
- 113 – Martin O'Donnell
- 111 – Tony Drago
- 111 – Tian Pengfei
- 104 – Mark Joyce
- 103 – Sam Harvey
- 102, 102 – Mark Davis
- 102 – Adam Wicheard
- 102 – Thanawat Thirapongpaiboon
- 101 – Barry Hawkins
- 100 – Stuart Carrington
- 100 – Barry Pinches
- 100 – Liang Wenbo
