= 2016 Snooker Shoot-Out =

2016 Ladbrokes Snooker Shoot Out
Tournament information
- Dates: 12–14 February 2016
- Venue: Hexagon Theatre
- City: Reading
- Country: England
- Organisation: WPBSA
- Format: Non-ranking event
- Total prize fund: £130,000
- Winner's share: £32,000
- Highest break: David Gilbert (ENG) (127)

Final
- Champion: Robin Hull (FIN)
- Runner-up: Luca Brecel (BEL)
- Score: 50–36 (one frame)

The 2016 Shoot Out (officially the 2016 Ladbrokes Snooker Shoot Out) was a professional non-ranking snooker tournament that took place between 12 and 14 February 2016 at the Hexagon Theatre in Reading, England. It was played under a variation of the standard rules of snooker.

Michael White was the defending champion, but he lost 1–66 against Ben Woollaston in round two.

Robin Hull won the final 50–36 against Luca Brecel.

== Tournament format ==
The tournament was played using a variation of the traditional snooker rules. The draw was randomised before each round. All matches were played over a single frame, each of which lasted up to 10 minutes. The event featured a variable shot clock; shots played in the first five minutes were allowed 15 seconds while the final five had a 10-second timer. All foul shots awarded the opponent a ball in hand. Unlike traditional snooker, if a ball did not hit a cushion on every shot, it was a foul. Rather than a coin toss, a lag was used to choose which player breaks. In the event of a draw, each player received a shot at the blue ball this is known as a "blue ball shootout". The player who potted the ball with the cue ball from inside the D and the blue ball on its spot with the opponent missing won the match.

=== Prize fund ===
The breakdown of prize money for this year is shown below:

- Winner: £32,000
- Runner-up: £16,000
- Semi-final: £8,000
- Quarter-final: £4,000
- Last 16: £2,000
- Last 32: £1,000
- Last 64: £500
- Highest break: £2,000
- Total: £130,000

== Tournament draw ==
All times in Greenwich Mean Time. Times for quarter-finals, semi-finals and final are approximate. Players in bold denote match winners.

=== Round 1 ===
==== 12 February – 18:30 ====
- **Michael White** (WAL) **73**–0 Mark King (ENG)
- Mark Davis (ENG) 31–**55** **Gary Wilson** (ENG)
- **Zhou Yuelong** (CHN) **70**–19 Michael Georgiou (ENG)
- Ken Doherty (IRE) 29–**38** **Tom Ford** (ENG)
- **Ali Carter** (ENG) **57**–0 Liam Highfield (ENG)
- Graeme Dott (SCO) 30–**70** **Ben Woollaston** (ENG)
- **Joe Perry** (ENG) **79**–17 Cao Yupeng (CHN)
- **David Gilbert** (ENG) **127**–0 Mark Joyce (ENG)
- **Jimmy Robertson** (ENG) **96**–0 David Grace (ENG)
- **Mark Allen** (NIR) **65**–20 Yu Delu (CHN)
- Alan McManus (SCO) 0–**84** **David Morris** (IRE)
- **Stuart Bingham** (ENG) **54**–38 Ricky Walden (ENG)
- **Luca Brecel** (BEL) **48**–37 Mike Dunn (ENG)
- **Ryan Day** (WAL) **55**–34 Michael Holt (ENG)
- **Jack Lisowski** (ENG) **50**–7 Sam Baird (ENG)
- **Shaun Murphy** (ENG) **112**–24 Dominic Dale (WAL)

==== 13 February – 12:30 ====
- John Higgins (SCO) 10–**62** **Andrew Higginson** (ENG)
- **Peter Lines** (ENG) **56**–33 Kurt Maflin (NOR)
- **Robert Milkins** (ENG) **53**–38 Marco Fu (HKG)
- **Mark Williams** (WAL) **70**–43 Rory McLeod (ENG)
- Tian Pengfei (CHN) 16–**56** **Joe Swail** (NIR)
- Jamie Jones (WAL) 1–**97** **Martin Gould** (ENG)
- Liang Wenbo (CHN) 52–**60** **Anthony McGill** (SCO)
- **Robin Hull** (FIN) **41**–35 Craig Steadman (ENG)
- **Rod Lawler** (ENG) **23**–1 Dechawat Poomjaeng (THA)
- **Kyren Wilson** (ENG) **55**–14 Li Hang (CHN)
- Anthony Hamilton (ENG) 50–**56** **Thepchaiya Un-Nooh** (THA)
- **Stuart Carrington** (ENG) **62**–7 Matthew Stevens (WAL)
- Barry Hawkins (ENG) 0–**48** **Peter Ebdon** (ENG)
- **Xiao Guodong** (CHN) **38**–25 Matthew Selt (ENG)
- Oliver Lines (ENG) 26–**59** **Ian Burns** (ENG)
- **Judd Trump** (ENG) **74**–22 Gerard Greene (NIR)

=== Round 2 ===
==== 13 February – 18:30 ====
- Stuart Bingham (ENG) 0–**69** **Rod Lawler** (ENG)
- Thepchaiya Un-Nooh (THA) 36–**60** **Ian Burns** (ENG)
- **Luca Brecel** (BEL) **46**–20 Xiao Guodong (CHN)
- **Zhou Yuelong** (CHN) **85**–0 Shaun Murphy (ENG)
- **Ali Carter** (ENG) **85**–5 Peter Lines (ENG)
- **Mark Williams** (WAL) **58**–32 David Gilbert (ENG)
- Kyren Wilson (ENG) 38–**52** **Ryan Day** (WAL)
- **Joe Swail** (NIR) **39**–1 Anthony McGill (SCO)
- **Robin Hull** (FIN) **70**–6 Judd Trump (ENG)
- **Andrew Higginson** (ENG) **85**–10 Martin Gould (ENG)
- Peter Ebdon (ENG) 9–**43** **David Morris** (IRE)
- **Joe Perry** (ENG) **46**–38 Tom Ford (ENG)
- Jimmy Robertson (ENG) 0–**67** **Jack Lisowski** (ENG)
- **Gary Wilson** (ENG) **62**–21 Stuart Carrington (ENG)
- Mark Allen (NIR) 56–**61** **Robert Milkins** (ENG)
- Michael White (WAL) 1–**66** **Ben Woollaston** (ENG)

=== Round 3 ===
==== 14 February – 13:30 ====
- **Rod Lawler** (ENG) **61**–24 Ali Carter (ENG)
- Ian Burns (ENG) 21–**49** **Robin Hull** (FIN)
- Gary Wilson (ENG) 16–**22** **Joe Swail** (NIR)
- Zhou Yuelong (CHN) 36–**57** **Ryan Day** (WAL)
- Jack Lisowski (ENG) 12–**72** **Andrew Higginson** (ENG)
- Ben Woollaston (ENG) 31–**47** **Luca Brecel** (BEL)
- **Robert Milkins** (ENG) **102**–17 David Morris (IRE)
- **Mark Williams** (WAL) **42**–13 Joe Perry (ENG)

=== Quarter-finals ===
==== 14 February – 18:30 ====
- Ryan Day (WAL) 7–**78** **Robin Hull** (FIN)
- Rod Lawler (ENG) 18–**27** **Luca Brecel** (BEL)
- **Mark Williams** (WAL) **39**–20 Andrew Higginson (ENG)
- Robert Milkins (ENG) 8–**23** **Joe Swail** (NIR)

=== Semi-finals ===
==== 14 February – 20:00 ====
- Joe Swail (NIR) 34–**38** **Luca Brecel** (BEL)
- Mark Williams (WAL) 41–**62** **Robin Hull** (FIN)

=== Final ===
Final: 1 frame. Referee: Colin Humphries; The Hexagon, Reading, England, 14 February 2016 – 20:30
Luca Brecel; Belgium	36–**50**	**Robin Hull**; Finland

== Century breaks ==
Only one century break was made during the tournament.

- 127 – David Gilbert
