= 2011 Q School =

Snooker tournaments

Tournament information
- Dates: 11–28 May 2012
- Venue: World Snooker Academy
- City: Sheffield
- Country: England
- Format: Qualifying School
- Qualifiers: 12 via the 3 events

The 2011 Q School was a series of three snooker tournaments held at the start of the 2011–12 snooker season. An event for amateur players, it served as a qualification event for a place on the professional World Snooker Tour for the following seasons. The events took place in May 2011 at the World Snooker Academy in Sheffield, England with a total 12 players qualifying via the three tournaments.

== Format ==
The 2011 Q School consisted of three events with 12 qualification places available. The two events had 124 entries competing for the 12 places on the main tour, four players qualifying from each of the three events. All matches were the best of seven frames.

== Event 1 ==
The first 2011 Q School event was held from 11 to 16 May 2011. Andrew Norman, David Grace, Adam Wicheard and Robin Hull qualified. The results of the four final matches are given below.

- Andrew Norman (ENG) 4–3 Chen Zhe (CHN)
- David Grace (ENG) 4–1 Zhang Anda (CHN)
- Adam Wicheard (ENG) 4–1 Fraser Patrick (SCO)
- Robin Hull (FIN) 4–3 David Gilbert (ENG)

== Event 2 ==
The second 2011 Q School event was held from 17 to 22 May 2011. Li Yan, David Morris, Simon Bedford and Tian Pengfei qualified. The results of the four final matches are given below.

- Li Yan (CHN) 4–1 David Gray (ENG)
- David Morris (IRL) 4–3 Michael Wild (ENG)
- Simon Bedford (ENG) 4–3 Lee Walker (WAL)
- Tian Pengfei (CHN) 4–2 David Gilbert (ENG)

== Event 3 ==
The third 2011 Q School event was held from 23 to 28 May 2011. Kurt Maflin, Stuart Carrington, Adam Duffy and David Gilbert qualified. The results of the four final matches are given below.

- Kurt Maflin (NOR) 4–1 Martin O'Donnell (ENG)
- Stuart Carrington (ENG) 4–2 Stephen Craigie (ENG)
- Adam Duffy (ENG) 4–2 David Gray (ENG)
- David Gilbert (ENG) 4–1 Allan Taylor (ENG)

== Performance of qualifiers ==
The following table shows the rankings of the 12 qualifiers from the 2011 Q School, at the end of the 2011–12 snooker season, together with their tour status for the 2012–13 snooker season. Unlike subsequent Q Schools, qualifiers were only guaranteed a single season on the tour. Since the world rankings were determined over two seasons, new players were given "starter points" to compensate them (see Snooker world ranking points 2011/2012). Players in the top-64 of the rankings retained their place on the tour while those outside the top-64 lost their place unless they qualified under a different category.

Player	End of 2011–12 season		Status for 2012–13 season
Player	Points	Ranking	Status for 2012–13 season
Andrew Norman (ENG)	18,000	78	Amateur
David Grace (ENG)	17,565	80	Qualified through the PTC Order of Merit
Adam Wicheard (ENG)	15,715	85	Amateur
Robin Hull (FIN)	10,925	94	Amateur
Li Yan (CHN)	20,215	68	Qualified through the PTC Order of Merit
David Morris (IRL)	18,835	73	Amateur
Simon Bedford (ENG)	12,970	89	Qualified through the PTC Order of Merit
Tian Pengfei (CHN)	17,280	81	Qualified as Chinese nominee
Kurt Maflin (NOR)	18,450	74	Qualified through the PTC Order of Merit
Stuart Carrington (ENG)	11,545	92	Amateur
Adam Duffy (ENG)	20,865	62	Retained place on tour
David Gilbert (ENG)	23,420	57	Retained place on tour
