= Kurt Maflin =

English-Norwegian snooker player

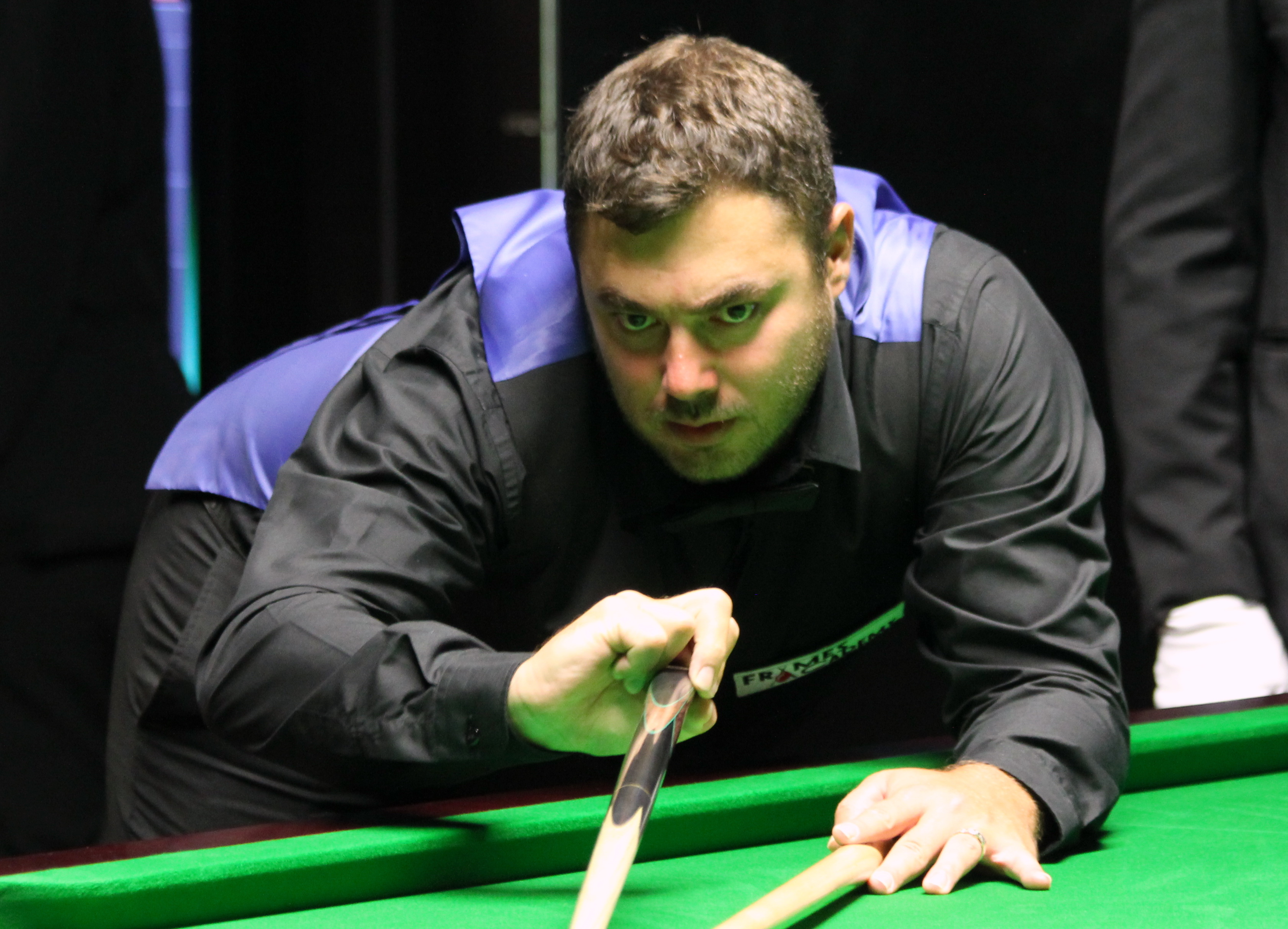
- Maflin at the 2016 Paul Hunter Classic

Personal information
- Nickname: The Viking
- Born: 8 August 1983 (age 43) Southwark, London, England

Sport
- Country: Norway (2004–present); England (until 2004)
- Sport: Snooker
- Professional: 2001/2002, 2003/2004, 2007/2008, 2010–2022
- Highest ranking: 21 (April 2021)
- Maximum breaks: 2
- Century breaks: 208
- Best ranking finish: Semi-final (x3)

Kurt Graham Maflin (born 8 August 1983) is an English-Norwegian former professional snooker player. He has compiled more than 200 century breaks during his career and has made two 147 breaks in professional competition.

== Career ==
=== Early career ===
Maflin began playing snooker at the age of four, achieving a high break of 25 by the time he was five. He increased his time spent at the table practising. As a rated top junior player, Maflin represented England in the 1999 Home International series in Prestatyn, North Wales, where England were victorious.

After appearing in the finals of the English National Championships in the Under-13 and Under-15 categories, he went on to become the first person to retain the English Under-17 national title (once held by Paul Hunter) in 2000 after winning it for the first time in 1999.

When aged 14, Maflin was invited, on behalf of TV Times magazine, to team up with former World Champion Dennis Taylor to raise money for the Leukaemia Research Fund at the 1998 Liverpool Victoria Charity Challenge event. After meeting the world's top players, Maflin and Taylor won £4,300 for the charity, playing 'Pounds for Points'. Maflin also appeared twice on BBC1's popular snooker game show series Junior Big Break: Stars of the Future in 1997, and winning the contestant the grand prize of a holiday in 1998.

He began his professional career by playing in the Challenge Tour (which was at the time the second-level professional tour) in 2000. In 2001, Maflin reached the final of the English Open Championship and was runner-up in the European Championship Final staged in Riga, Latvia. The same year he won his place on World Snooker's Main Tour becoming the second youngest professional snooker player in the world at the time. Despite reaching the last 48 of the Welsh Open before losing to Tony Drago, the rest of Maflin's results were not strong enough to remain on the Main Tour, forcing him to return to the Challenge Tour. He won Event 4 and was back into Main Tour for the 2003/04 season, but again couldn't hold his place. He moved to Norway with his partner, female snooker player Anita Rizzuti, and nearly gave up snooker, but his interest was revived after an offer from Norwegian businessman Knut Pederson. "He said he would sponsor me if I made a century break in the final of one of the Norwegian league matches," Maflin explained. "I got a 137 in the first frame and never looked back since".

=== Return to competition ===
Maflin returned to serious competition for the 2006 Challenge Tour. He won this to return to the Main Tour for the 2007/08 season. He also won the gold medal at the 2006 IBSF World Championships in Amman, Jordan, beating Daniel Ward 11–8 in the final to become World Amateur Champion. Maflin compiled 15 century breaks on his way to victory and had to win 15 consecutive matches.

Maflin had a great run in the non-ranking Masters qualifying tournament, beating Judd Trump and Jimmy White to reach the final before losing out on a wild card place in the event to Barry Hawkins. However, his results in the ranking tournaments were disappointing, aside from last 48 appearance at the China Open. Following the black-ball defeat to Gareth Coppack in the first round match of the World Championship he was relegated from the tour, having finished only 82nd in the world rankings.

Maflin spent the 2008/09 season trying to re-qualify to the tour via PIOS, but he missed the opportunity by just 20 points, finishing 10th. He followed it by another near-miss the next season, finishing 15th. To make things worse, Maflin suffered a car crash which left him with a six-inch metal plate and seven screws in his shoulder. Nevertheless, he recovered to enter the 2010 EBSA European Play-Offs and beat Alex Borg 5–2 in the final to secure his return to the Main Tour.

=== 2010/2011 season ===
Maflin had a great start to the season as in June 2010, at the inaugural Player's Tour Championship event in Sheffield, he compiled his first professional 147 break in his first round match against Michał Zieliński. However, he struggled for form in the subsequent events until the 2011 China Open, in which he defeated Simon Bedford, Jack Lisowski, Dave Harold and Mark King to reach the final stages of a major ranking event for the first time, making four centuries in the progress. In the last 32 he led Ding Junhui 4–1 but eventually lost 4–5. Maflin then lost a decider to Xiao Guodong in the World Championship qualifying, a high quality match where each of the players made 2 centuries and multiple 50+ breaks. Maflin was relegated from the tour, however this time he made an immediate return through brand new 2011 Q School tournament, having won all his matches in the Event 3.

=== 2011/2012 season ===
In the 2011–12 season Maflin reached the fifth qualifying round of the Shanghai Masters. He played in all 12 of the minor-ranking Players Tour Championship events throughout the season, with his best finish coming in Event 12 where he beat James Wattana, former world champion Shaun Murphy and Jack Lisowski to reach the last 16 before losing to Andrew Higginson. He was placed 60th on the PTC Order of Merit. Maflin finished the season ranked world number 72, out of the top 64 who retain their places for the 2012–13 season. However, due to his performances in the PTC events he has earned a spot on the tour for snooker season 2012–13 and 2012–13.

=== 2012/2013 season ===
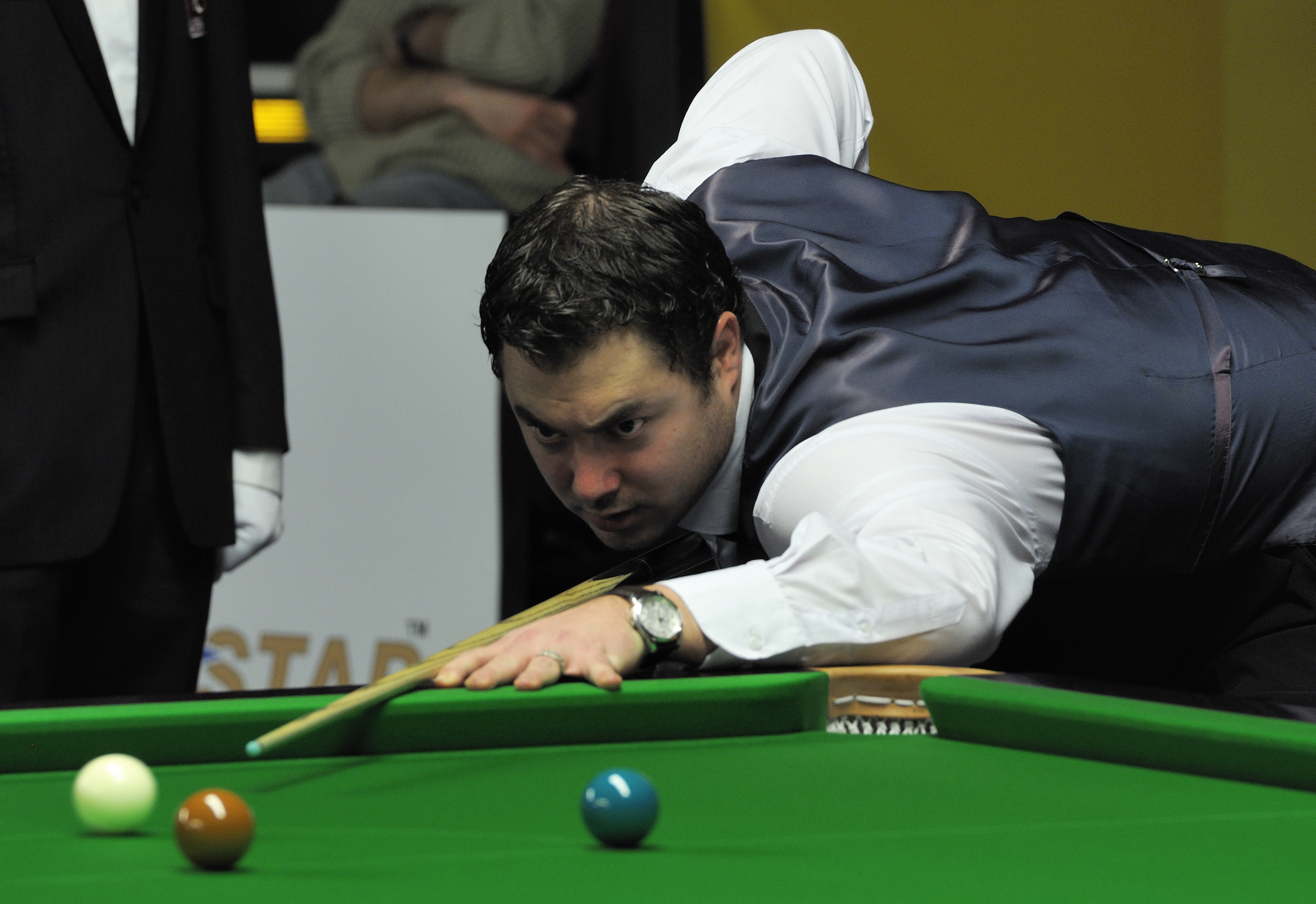
Kurt Maflin at 2013 German Masters

Maflin won three matches to reach the final round in qualifying for two of the first five ranking events of the 2012/2013 season. These came in the Wuxi Classic where he lost in a deciding frame to Michael Holt, and the International Championship where he lost 2–6 to Mark Davis. He took advantage of the new flatter qualifying system used in the German Masters, whereby he would only need to win two matches to progress to the main stage in Berlin, by beating Joel Walker and Tom Ford, dropping only a single frame in the process. At the venue Maflin defeated Xiao Guodong 5–4, before losing 3–5 to Holt in the last 16. Maflin had a very good season in the minor-ranking PTC events, with his best results coming at the Gdynia Open and the FFB Open, where was knocked out in the quarter-finals by Jamie Burnett and Rod Lawler respectively. In the latter event Maflin had arguably the best win of his career, by coming back from 0–3 to defeat the in-form Neil Robertson in a televised match. He also reached the last 16 of the Scottish Open (scoring his second maximum break along the way) to help him finish 23rd on the Order of Merit, inside the top 26 who qualified for the Finals. There, Maflin had the best run in a ranking of his career by beating 1997 world champion Ken Doherty 4–2, Lawler and Ben Woollaston both 4–3 to reach the semi-finals. He played Ding Junhui and was outplayed in a 0–4 defeat, only managing to score a total of 52 points in the entire match. Nevertheless, the cheque of £20,000 for reaching the last four was the highest of his career to date. Maflin beat Craig Steadman and Steve Davis to advance to the final round of World Championship Qualifying. He led former world champion Peter Ebdon 8–6 but lost four frames in a row to be denied a place in the World Championship for the first time. He increased his ranking by eight spots during the year to end it world number 64.

=== 2013/2014 season ===
Following a strong ending to the previous season, Maflin's performances at the start of the new season were largely unremarkable, until he reached the last 16 of the International Championship. Maflin edged out Luca Brecel 6–4 in the qualifying match, then at the venue defeated both Robert Milkins and Mark Williams by 6–2 scorelines. He faced Graeme Dott and made a 71 break at 5–3 and 61–0 down in points, before taking the match into a deciding frame which he lost. Despite a surprising 6–4 loss to amateur Mitchell Travis in the last 64 of the UK Championship, Maflin moved up to 51st in the world rankings at the end of the year. 2014 started well for Maflin, as he reached the last 16 of the German Masters for the second year in a row, having scored a win against world number two Mark Selby in the process; he however was beaten 5–1 by Joe Perry, bizarrely losing the last frame under the three miss rule before a single ball was potted. Nevertheless, this result allowed Maflin to further improve his ranking, entering the top 48 for the first time in his career. An early defeat to Lee Page at the final European Tour event, the Gdynia Open left Maflin 37th on the European Order of Merit, while on the Asian Order of Merit he finished only 59th, thus failing to qualify for the Finals. At the Haikou World Open he defeated Perry and Ali Carter to reach his third last 16 of the season, but lost 5–3 to Mark Joyce. Maflin's season finished with two last 64 defeats at the China Open and the World Championship to Judd Trump and Andrew Higginson respectively; he ended up 34th in the world, an incredible rise of 30 places from his ranking 12 months previously.

=== 2014/2015 season ===
Maflin had a difficult first half of 2014/15 season, with just two last 16 appearances in the minor-ranking Yixing Open and Lisbon Open to his name, while at the major tournaments he couldn't progress beyond the last 64 stage. He continued to struggle into the early months of 2015 as he suffered a string of first round exits. A return to form came for Maflin at the China Open, as he defeated Ali Carter, Mike Dunn, Robin Hull and Shaun Murphy to reach his second career semi-final, where he faced the reigning world champion Mark Selby. Despite making two century breaks, he lost the last three frames to be denied his first ever final by a 6–3 scoreline. Maflin carried his good form into the World Championship qualifiers, as he convincingly beat David Grace 10–5 and Steve Davis 10–1 to once again reach the final round. Maflin fell 6–3 down to Fergal O'Brien after the first session, but won six frames in a row the next day to find himself one frame away from the victory; O'Brien then fought back to 9–9, however Maflin survived the tense decider to win 10–9 and secured his debut at the Crucible. He was drawn to play Selby in the first round and came from 7–3 and 8–4 down to lead Selby 9–8. Maflin had chances to complete a shock win in the next two frames but could not take them as Selby recovered to win 10–9.

=== 2015/2016 season ===
Maflin lost in the first round of the International Championship and UK Championship 6–2 to Jamie Jones and 6–3 to Sean O'Sullivan respectively. His first win at the venue stage of a ranking event this season came at the German Masters courtesy of overcoming Marco Fu 5–1 and then lost 5–3 to Luca Brecel. After knocking out Hammad Miah and Leo Fernandez, Maflin lost 4–2 to home favourite Mark Williams at the Welsh Open. He made it through to the final round of World Championship qualifying and was defeated 10–7 by Robert Milkins.

=== 2016/2017 season ===
In the first half of the 2016–17 season, Maflin got to the last 16 of two tournaments, the World Open (lost 5–1 to Shaun Murphy) and the Northern Ireland Open (lost 4–2 to Mark King. Victories over Fang Xiongman, James Wattana, Mitchell Mann and Yan Bingtao at the Welsh Open saw him progress to the quarter-finals where he was defeated 5–2 by Robert Milkins.

=== 2019/2020 season ===
Maflin qualified for the 2020 World Snooker Championship, in the first round against David Gilbert in frame 16 he attempted a 147 but the cueball hit the yellow on its spot after he potted the 14th red on so he was not on the black to continue the maximum, he stuck his middle finger at the cueball and was subsequently warned by the referee for the obscene gesture at the start of the next frame, warned that he would be docked a frame if he repeated such a thing. He was not fined for misconduct however. He nevertheless won the match, followed by defeating John Higgins, voted one of the top-10 matches of the season, before falling to Anthony McGill in the quarter-finals.

== Personal life ==
Maflin married Anita Rizzuti in May 2013. They live in Oslo with their son Neon. Anita is an amateur snooker player with whom Maflin participated in the 2014 national world cup. Maflin is a Chelsea fan.

== Performance and rankings timeline ==
Tournament	1999/ 00	2000/ 01	2001/ 02	2002/ 03	2003/ 04	2004/ 05	2007/ 08	2010/ 11	2011/ 12	2012/ 13	2013/ 14	2014/ 15	2015/ 16	2016/ 17	2017/ 18	2018/ 19	2019/ 20	2020/ 21	2021/ 22
Ranking (Note: It shows the ranking at the beginning of the season)	(Note: He was an amateur)		(Note: New players on the Main Tour don't have a ranking)						85	(Note: Players qualified through Players Tour Championship Order of Merit started the season without ranking points)	64	34	37	50	52	44	49	27	21
Ranking tournaments
Championship League	Tournament Not Held				Non-Ranking Event													RR	A
British Open	A	A	LQ	A	LQ	A	Tournament Not Held												WD
Northern Ireland Open	Tournament Not Held													4R	2R	2R	1R	QF	A
English Open	Tournament Not Held													1R	1R	1R	3R	3R	LQ
UK Championship	A	A	LQ	A	LQ	A	LQ	LQ	LQ	LQ	2R	2R	1R	2R	3R	2R	4R	3R	1R
Scottish Open (Note: The event was called the Players Championship (2003/2004))	A	A	LQ	A	LQ	Tournament Not Held				MR	Not Held			2R	1R	1R	3R	1R	LQ
World Grand Prix	Tournament Not Held											NR	DNQ	DNQ	DNQ	DNQ	1R	1R	DNQ
Shoot Out	Tournament Not Held							Non-Ranking Event						1R	1R	2R	2R	WD	WD
German Masters	Tournament Not Held							LQ	LQ	2R	3R	LQ	2R	LQ	LQ	1R	LQ	LQ	1R
Players Championship (Note: The event was called the Players Tour Championship Grand Final (2010/2011–2015/2016))	Tournament Not Held							DNQ	DNQ	SF	DNQ	DNQ	DNQ	DNQ	DNQ	DNQ	DNQ	DNQ	DNQ
European Masters (Note: The event was called the European Open (2001/2002–2003/2004) and the Malta Cup (2004/2005 and 2007/2008))	Not Held		LQ	A	LQ	A	NR	Tournament Not Held						LQ	LQ	LQ	LQ	1R	3R
Welsh Open	A	A	LQ	A	LQ	A	LQ	LQ	LQ	LQ	2R	1R	3R	QF	2R	QF	1R	WD	2R
Gibraltar Open	Tournament Not Held												MR	2R	2R	4R	WD	A	WD
Tour Championship	Tournament Not Held															DNQ	DNQ	DNQ	DNQ
World Championship	LQ	LQ	LQ	LQ	LQ	LQ	LQ	LQ	LQ	LQ	LQ	1R	LQ	LQ	LQ	LQ	QF	1R	LQ
Non-ranking tournaments
Haining Open	Tournament Not Held											Minor-Rank		3R	A	A	A	NH	A
The Masters	A	A	A	LQ	LQ	A	LQ	A	A	A	A	A	A	A	A	A	A	A	A
Championship League	Tournament Not Held						A	A	A	A	A	RR	A	A	A	A	RR	RR	A
Former ranking tournaments
Thailand Masters	A	A	LQ	NR	Tournament Not Held														
Irish Masters	Non-Ranking Event			A	LQ	A	Tournament Not Held												
Northern Ireland Trophy	Tournament Not Held						LQ	Tournament Not Held											
Wuxi Classic	Tournament Not Held							Non-Ranking		LQ	1R	1R	Tournament Not Held						
Australian Goldfields Open	Tournament Not Held								LQ	LQ	LQ	LQ	A	Tournament Not Held					
Shanghai Masters	Tournament Not Held						LQ	LQ	LQ	LQ	LQ	LQ	LQ	1R	QF	Non-Ranking		Not Held	
Paul Hunter Classic (Note: The event was called the Grand Prix Fürth (2004/2005))	Tournament Not Held					Pro-am		Minor-Ranking Event						3R	2R	2R	NR	Not Held	
Indian Open	Tournament Not Held										LQ	LQ	NH	LQ	2R	LQ	Not Held		
China Open	A	A	LQ	Not Held		A	LQ	1R	LQ	LQ	1R	SF	LQ	1R	1R	1R	Not Held		
Riga Masters (Note: The event was called the Riga Open (2014/2015–2015/2016))	Tournament Not Held											Minor-Rank		LQ	2R	1R	SF	Not Held	
International Championship	Tournament Not Held									LQ	3R	1R	1R	2R	1R	1R	2R	Not Held	
China Championship	Tournament Not Held													NR	2R	1R	QF	Not Held	
World Open (Note: The event was called the Grand Prix (1999/2000–2000/2001, 2004/2005 and 2007/2008) and the LG Cup (2001/2002–2003/2004))	A	A	LQ	A	LQ	A	LQ	LQ	LQ	LQ	3R	Not Held		3R	LQ	1R	LQ	Not Held	
Former non-ranking tournaments
Masters Qualifying Event (Note: The event was also called the Benson & Hedges Championship (1999/2000–2002/2003))	A	A	A	1R	2R	NH	F	Tournament Not Held											
Shoot-Out	Tournament Not Held							A	A	QF	QF	1R	1R	Ranking Event					

Performance Table Legend
LQ	lost in the qualifying draw	#R	lost in the early rounds of the tournament (WR = Wildcard round, RR = Round robin)	QF	lost in the quarter-finals
SF	lost in the semi–finals	F	lost in the final	W	won the tournament
DNQ	did not qualify for the tournament	A	did not participate in the tournament	WD	withdrew from the tournament

NH / Not Held	means an event was not held.
NR / Non-Ranking Event	means an event is/was no longer a ranking event.
R / Ranking Event	means an event is/was a ranking event.
MR / Minor-Ranking Event	means an event is/was a minor-ranking event.

== Career finals ==
=== Non-ranking finals: 2 (1 title) ===
Outcome	No.	Year	Championship	Opponent in the final	Score
Winner	1.	2003	Challenge Tour - Event 4	(England) James Leadbetter	6–2
Runner-up	1.	2007	Masters Qualifying Event	(England) Barry Hawkins	4–6

=== Amateur finals: 12 (7 titles) ===
Outcome	No.	Year	Championship	Opponent in the final	Score
Runner-up	1.	1998	English Under-15 Championship	(England) Mark Selby	3–4
Winner	1.	1999	English Under-17 Championship	(England) Ricky Walden	5–4
Winner	2.	2000	English Under-17 Championship (2)	(England) Adam Wicheard	5–2
Runner-up	2.	2001	English Open	(England) Lee Spick	0–8
Runner-up	3.	2001	EBSA European Snooker Championship	(Belgium) Bjorn Haneveer	6–7
Winner	3.	2006	Norwegian Amateur Championship	(Norway) Malvin Bjelland	4–0
Runner-up	4.	2006	PIOS - Event 1	(England) Munraj Pal	3–6
Winner	4.	2006	World Amateur Championship	(England) Daniel Ward	11–8
Winner	5.	2007	PIOS - Event 5	(England) Ashley Wright	6–3
Runner-up	5.	2007	PIOS - Event 8	(Scotland) James McBain	4–6
Winner	6.	2010	EBSA International Open	(Malta) Alex Borg	5–2
Winner	7.	2016	Norwegian Amateur Championship (2)	(Norway) Audun Risan Heimsjø	4–0
