= Mark Joyce =

English snooker player

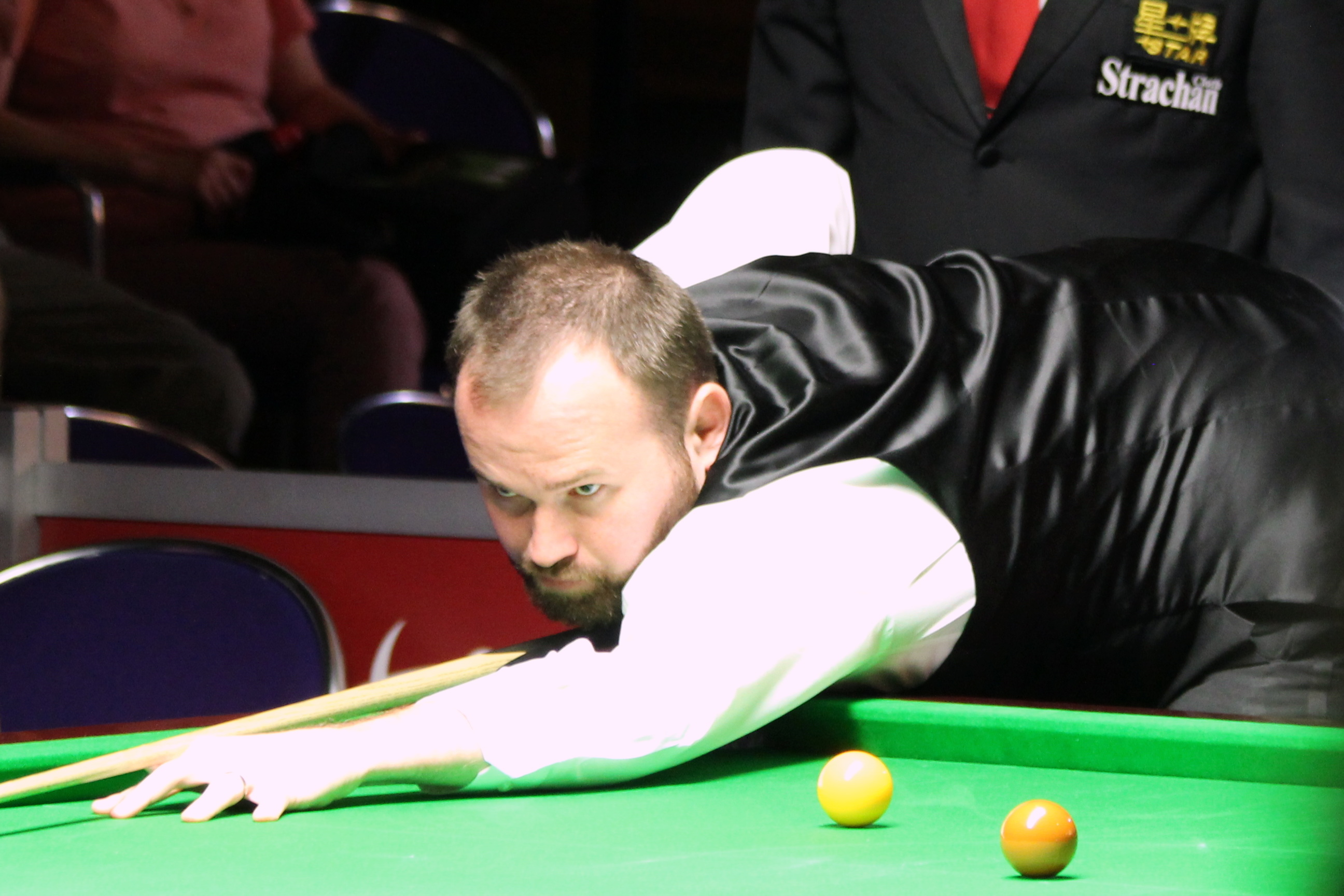
- Joyce at the 2016 Paul Hunter Classic

Personal information
- Born: 11 August 1983 (age 43) Walsall, West Midlands, England

Sport
- Country: England
- Sport: Snooker
- Professional: 2006–2024
- Highest ranking: 29 (November 2014)
- Century breaks: 126
- Best ranking finish: Runner-up (x1)

Mark Joyce (born 11 August 1983) is an English former professional snooker player who lives in Walsall. He began his professional career by playing on the Challenge Tour in 2003. Joyce enjoyed an outstanding amateur career, winning the European Under-19 Championship in 2001, the English Open in 2005 and the English Amateur Championship in 2006, beating Martin O'Donnell 8–3 in the final. Joyce also finished fifth in the 2005/06 Pontin's International Open Series, winning the second of eight events, to book a place on Main Tour.

== Career ==
=== 2006/07 season ===
Joyce had a very uneventful first season on Main Tour, failing to qualify for any of the major events. He ended the season losing in the penultimate qualifying round of the World Championship to Fergal O'Brien 10–4. He also recorded his highest break of 130 in professional play during the qualifiers. This would remain his highest break until the qualifying stages of the 2010 World Championship. He ended the season ranked 73rd.

=== 2007/08 season ===
Joyce started the season with 2 wins in qualifying for the Shanghai Masters before narrowly losing 5–4 to veteran John Parrott in the penultimate qualifying round. The Grand Prix would be the first tournament that Joyce would qualify for after finishing 2nd in his qualifying group. However, he would go on to lose all 5 matches in the group stage of the tournament. After failing to qualify for the Northern Ireland Trophy, Joyce won 3 matches to reach the final qualifying round of the UK Championship before being ousted 9–2 by Ian McCulloch. The remainder of the season was fairly uneventful as he failed to qualify for the Malta Cup, Welsh Open and the China Open. He finished the season off by losing in the third qualifying round of the World Championship. His exploits in the season resulted in his ranking going up 14 places to number 59. This will mean he would have 1 less qualifying match to play in the following season.

=== 2008/09 season ===
The season started with a 5–0 victory against Patrick Wallace and then a 5–0 defeat to Judd Trump in the first ranking event of the season, the Northern Ireland Trophy. He followed this up with a run to the final qualifying round of the Shanghai Masters in the next event. Another win and a defeat in the Grand Prix after being reverted to a knockout competition and the same result in the Bahrain Championship. Joyce only recorded 1 win from the next three ranking tournaments, the UK Championship, the Welsh Open and the China Open. His best performance of the season was in the qualifying tournament for the Masters, where he reached final, only to lose 1–6 to Judd Trump. The season ended poorly for Joyce with a 10–6 defeat to Patrick Wallace in his first match of the World Championship qualifiers. Despite this, he ended the season up 2 places to number 57 in the rankings.

=== 2009/10 season ===
Joyce's fourth season on the tour got off to a bad start with a 5–2 defeat to Joe Jogia in the qualifying for the Shanghai Masters. He followed this up with victories over Andrew Norman, Michael Judge and Barry Hawkins to qualify for the Grand Prix. He was drawn against the defending champion John Higgins and was defeated 5–1. The remainder of the season up to the World Championship was uneventful with only 2 wins in 3 ranking tournaments. In qualifying for the World Championship, he recorded a 139 break (his highest so far in professional snooker) against Jimmy Robertson in the 3rd qualifying round. He won this match 10–9 and then defeated Michael Judge 10–8 to set up a meeting with Jamie Cope for a place at The Crucible. Cope was to prove too strong for Joyce as he ran away a 10–5 winner.

=== 2010/11 season ===
Despite starting from the first round of qualification, Joyce managed to qualify for the televised stages of the UK Championship for the first time in his career, beating six-time World Champion Steve Davis 9–2 in the final qualifying round. He reached the quarter-finals of a ranking tournament for the first time in his career by defeating Ali Carter 9–6 in the last 32 and Judd Trump 9–7 in the last 16. In quarter-finals, he lost 7–9 to Mark Williams. He ended the season with the highest ranking of his career so far at world number 42, which meant he had climbed 16 places during the year.

=== 2011/12 season ===
Joyce began the season by winning the Pink Ribbon Pro-Am charity tournament, where he whitewashed Michael Holt 4–0 in the final. Due to his new ranking he would need to win two qualifying matches to reach the main stage of the ranking events on the snooker calendar. However, he started the season poorly and saw his ranking slip to number 51 in January, meaning he would now need to win three matches. He achieved this at the Welsh Open as he saw off Daniel Wells, Joe Jogia and held his nerve against Andrew Higginson in a final frame decider to book his place in the main draw, where he played Shaun Murphy. A huge shock appeared to be in the offing as Joyce raced into a 2–0 lead, but Murphy found his form and four frames in a row to triumph. Joyce failed to win another qualifying match in the remaining three tournaments, concluding with a 4–10 loss to David Morris in the World Championship. He finished the season ranked world number 59, dropping 17 places from his starting point, but still inside the top 64 who retain their places for the 2012–13 season.

=== 2012/13 season ===
Joyce failed to qualify for any of the first four ranking events of the season, but then defeated Andy Hicks and Jamie Cope to reach the UK Championship. At the event in York, the world number 50 Joyce pulled off a major shock by coming back from 2–5 down to knock out the world number one Judd Trump 6–5. In the second round he was beaten 2–6 by Ali Carter. After this, he won three matches to qualify for both the World Open and the China Open. Trump exacted his revenge in the first round of the World Open by whitewashing him 0–5, and he withdrew from the China Open as his partner was due to give birth. Joyce had a very consistent season in the minor-ranking Players Tour Championship events, with his best results coming in Event 4 and European Tour Event 5, where he lost in the quarter-finals to Trump and Ken Doherty respectively. He finished 26th on the PTC Order of Merit, claiming the final spot to qualify for the Finals, where Marco Fu beat him 4–2. Joyce's season ended when he was beaten 7–10 by Michael Holt in the final round of World Championship Qualifying. He climbed 17 places in the rankings during the year to end it placed at world number 42.

=== 2013/14 season ===
The 2013–14 season proved to be a successful one as he played at the venue stage of six ranking events, three more than his previous best. His deepest run out of these came at the World Open which he qualified for by beating Fraser Patrick 5–2. Once at the venue in Haikou, China, Joyce defeated David Morris 5–2 and came back from 4–2 down against last year's World Championship runner-up Barry Hawkins to hit breaks of 65, 68 and 72 to edge him out 5–4. He also fought back in the last 16 as he lost the opening two frames against Kurt Maflin to earn a 5–3 victory. In Joyce's second career ranking event quarter-final he played Marco Fu and was defeated 5–3.

=== 2014/15 season ===
Joyce played in seven ranking events this season, the most in a single year in his career to date. He was knocked out in the first round of the 2014 Wuxi Classic 5–1 by Mark Williams and at the Australian Goldfields Open he beat Ryan Day 5–3, before losing 5–2 to Stuart Bingham in the second round. This last 16 exit proved to be Joyce's deepest run in an event this season. He also reached the last 32 of the Indian Open, losing 4–1 to Tian Pengfei.

=== 2015/16 season ===
Joyce opened the season with three wins to qualify for the Australian Goldfields Open and beat Mark Allen 5–2, before losing 5–4 to Matthew Selt. A first round defeat to Ryan Day in the International Championship was followed by defeating Barry Pinches and Sydney Wilson at the UK Championship. Joyce built a 5–0 lead over Dechawat Poomjaeng, but lost six frames in a row to be eliminated in the third round. He bounced back to win two matches and qualify for the German Masters and recorded his second 5–2 first round triumph of the season over Allen. Joyce reached his third career quarter-final after overcoming Mark King 5–2 and led Luca Brecel 4–2, but would lose 5–4. He lost in the second round of the Welsh Open and China Open 4–1 to Alan McManus and 5–1 to John Higgins respectively.

=== 2016/17 season ===
At the International Championship, Joyce overcame Martin Gould 6–3, before losing 6–4 to Zhou Yuelong. He also lost in the second round of the UK Championship 6–2 against David Gilbert. The highlight of Joyce's season came at the China Open where, after narrowly seeing off Fraser Patrick 5–4, he was never behind against Ronnie O'Sullivan in another 5–4 win. It was the only time Joyce played in the last 16 of a ranking event this season and he was defeated 5–3 by Ding Junhui.

=== 2017/18 season ===
At the UK Championship, Joyce reached the quarter final for the second time after beating the likes of David Gilbert and Neil Robertson. In particular, Joyce said that his 6–5 win over Robertson was one of the best wins of his career. He faced Ryan Day in the quarter final and narrowly lost in the decider.

=== 2019/20 season ===
Joyce reached his first ever ranking final in the Riga Masters after beating Sam Baird, Scott Donaldson, Liam Highfield, Jack Lisowski, Stuart Carrington, and Kurt Maflin. He lost 5–2 to Yan Bingtao in the final.

=== 2020/21 season ===
Joyce qualified for the World Snooker Championship for the first time after beating Anthony Hamilton and Igor Figueiredo in the qualifying rounds. He drew the reigning champion Ronnie O'Sullivan in the first round. During the match, Joyce closed the gap to 4-3 and had a chance to win the eighth frame to level the match, but O'Sullivan won the frame with the final black to lead 5–3. Joyce ultimately lost 10–4 to O'Sullivan.

== Personal life ==
Joyce practises mainly at the Qbar snooker club in Walsall Wood although he has said in an interview that he travels out at least once a week to practise with other players, to keep himself sharp. He is a Manchester United fan and is a keen golfer.

In 2010, Joyce was the victim of an attack outside a nightclub in Birmingham, after an argument in a bar over whose turn it was to get served. He suffered a fractured elbow and problems with his eyesight which led to a reduction in playing time during the first six months of 2011.

== Performance and rankings timeline ==
Tournament	2001/ 02	2002/ 03	2003/ 04	2004/ 05	2006/ 07	2007/ 08	2008/ 09	2009/ 10	2010/ 11	2011/ 12	2012/ 13	2013/ 14	2014/ 15	2015/ 16	2016/ 17	2017/ 18	2018/ 19	2019/ 20	2020/ 21	2021/ 22	2022/ 23	2023/ 24	2024/ 25	2026/ 27
Ranking (Note: It shows the ranking at the beginning of the season)	(Note: He was an amateur)				(Note: New players don't have a ranking)	73	59	57	58	42	59	42	38	47	41	48	42	54	64	42	58	64		
Ranking tournaments
Championship League	Tournament Not Held					Non-Ranking Event													RR	2R	RR	RR	RR	2R
China Open	A	Not Held		A	LQ	LQ	LQ	LQ	LQ	LQ	WD	1R	1R	2R	3R	1R	LQ	Tournament Not Held						
Wuhan Open	Tournament Not Held																					1R	3R	
British Open	A	A	A	A	Tournament Not Held															1R	1R	LQ	1R	3R
English Open	Tournament Not Held														1R	2R	1R	1R	2R	1R	LQ	LQ	LQ	
Shenzhen Open (Note: The event was called the Xi'an Grand Prix (2024/2025))	Tournament Not Held																						A	
Northern Ireland Open	Tournament Not Held														1R	1R	1R	3R	1R	LQ	LQ	LQ	LQ	
International Championship	Tournament Not Held										LQ	2R	1R	1R	2R	3R	LQ	1R	Not Held			1R	A	
UK Championship	A	A	A	A	LQ	LQ	LQ	LQ	QF	LQ	2R	1R	2R	3R	2R	QF	2R	1R	2R	3R	LQ	1R	LQ	
Shoot Out	Tournament Not Held								Non-Ranking Event						2R	1R	1R	1R	2R	2R	1R	2R	2R	
Scottish Open (Note: The event was called the Players Championship (2003/2004))	A	A	A	Tournament Not Held							MR	Not Held			2R	3R	3R	1R	3R	LQ	1R	LQ	A	
German Masters	Tournament Not Held								LQ	LQ	LQ	1R	LQ	QF	LQ	2R	LQ	LQ	1R	LQ	LQ	1R	A	
Welsh Open	A	A	A	A	LQ	LQ	LQ	LQ	LQ	1R	LQ	1R	2R	2R	1R	1R	1R	2R	WD	1R	1R	LQ	A	
World Grand Prix	Tournament Not Held												NR	DNQ	DNQ	2R	DNQ	DNQ	DNQ	DNQ	DNQ	DNQ	DNQ	
Players Championship (Note: The event was called the Players Tour Championship Grand Final (2010/2011–2015/2016))	Tournament Not Held								DNQ	DNQ	1R	DNQ	DNQ	DNQ	DNQ	DNQ	DNQ	DNQ	DNQ	DNQ	DNQ	DNQ	DNQ	
World Open (Note: The event was called the LG Cup (2001/2002–2003/2004) and the Grand Prix (2004/2005, 2006/2007–2009/2010))	A	A	A	A	LQ	RR	LQ	1R	LQ	LQ	1R	QF	Not Held		LQ	1R	1R	LQ	Not Held			LQ	A	
Tour Championship	Tournament Not Held																DNQ	DNQ	DNQ	DNQ	DNQ	DNQ	DNQ	
World Championship	A	LQ	LQ	LQ	LQ	LQ	LQ	LQ	LQ	LQ	LQ	LQ	LQ	LQ	LQ	LQ	LQ	LQ	1R	LQ	LQ	LQ	A	
Non-ranking tournaments
The Masters	A	A	A	A	LQ	LQ	LQ	LQ	A	A	A	A	A	A	A	A	A	A	A	A	A	A	A	
Championship League	Tournament Not Held					A	A	A	A	A	A	A	A	A	A	A	A	2R	A	A	A	A	A	
Former ranking tournaments
Northern Ireland Trophy	Tournament Not Held				LQ	LQ	LQ	Tournament Not Held																
Bahrain Championship	Tournament Not Held						LQ	Tournament Not Held																
Wuxi Classic (Note: The event was called the Jiangsu Classic (2008/2009–2009/2010))	Tournament Not Held						Non-Ranking Event				LQ	LQ	1R	Tournament Not Held										
Australian Goldfields Open	Tournament Not Held									LQ	LQ	LQ	2R	2R	Tournament Not Held									
Shanghai Masters	Tournament Not Held					LQ	LQ	LQ	LQ	LQ	LQ	1R	LQ	LQ	LQ	1R	Non-Ranking		Not Held			Non-Ranking		
Paul Hunter Classic (Note: The event was called the Grand Prix Fürth (2004/2005) and the Fürth German Open (2006/2007))	Not Held			Pro-am Event					Minor-Ranking Event						2R	QF	3R	NR	Tournament Not Held					
Indian Open	Tournament Not Held											2R	2R	NH	1R	LQ	LQ	Tournament Not Held						
Riga Masters (Note: The event was called the Riga Open (2014/2015–2015/2016))	Tournament Not Held												Minor-Rank		LQ	QF	LQ	F	Tournament Not Held					
China Championship	Tournament Not Held														NR	2R	1R	2R	Tournament Not Held					
WST Pro Series	Tournament Not Held																		RR	Tournament Not Held				
Turkish Masters	Tournament Not Held																			LQ	Tournament Not Held			
Gibraltar Open	Tournament Not Held													MR	1R	1R	1R	3R	1R	1R	Tournament Not Held			
WST Classic	Tournament Not Held																				2R	Not Held		
European Masters (Note: The event was called the European Open (2001/2002–2003/2004) and the Malta Cup (2004/2005 and 2006/2007–2007/2008))	A	A	A	A	LQ	NR	Tournament Not Held								LQ	LQ	LQ	LQ	1R	LQ	2R	LQ	Not Held	
Saudi Arabia Masters	Tournament Not Held																						A	NH
Former non-ranking tournaments
Merseyside Professional Championship	1R	A	A	A	Tournament Not Held																			
Masters Qualifying Event	A	A	A	NH	2R	1R	F	2R	Tournament Not Held															
Shoot Out	Tournament Not Held								A	1R	2R	1R	1R	1R	Ranking Event									
Six-red World Championship (Note: The event was called the Six-red Snooker International (2008/2009) and the Six-red World Grand Prix (2009/2010))	Tournament Not Held						A	A	A	NH	A	A	A	A	A	A	A	A	Not Held		LQ	Not Held		

Performance Table Legend
LQ	lost in the qualifying draw	#R	lost in the early rounds of the tournament (WR = Wildcard round, RR = Round robin)	QF	lost in the quarter-finals
SF	lost in the semi-finals	F	lost in the final	W	won the tournament
DNQ	did not qualify for the tournament	A	did not participate in the tournament	WD	withdrew from the tournament

NH / Not Held	means an event was not held
NR / Non-Ranking Event	means an event is/was no longer a ranking event
R / Ranking Event	means an event is/was a ranking event
MR / Minor-Ranking Event	means an event is/was a minor-ranking event

== Career finals ==
=== Ranking finals: 1 ===
Outcome	No.	Year	Championship	Opponent in the final	Score
Runner-up	1.	2019	Riga Masters	(China) Yan Bingtao	2–5

=== Non-ranking finals: 1 ===
Outcome	No.	Year	Championship	Opponent in the final	Score
Runner-up	1.	2008	Masters Qualifying Event	(England) Judd Trump	1–6

=== Pro-am finals: 3 (2 titles) ===
Outcome	No.	Year	Championship	Opponent in the final	Score
Winner	1.	2011	Pink Ribbon	(England) Michael Holt	4–0
Winner	2.	2019	Vienna Snooker Open	(England) Mark King	5–4
Runner-up	1.	2026	Pink Ribbon	(England) Stan Moody	2–4

=== Amateur finals: 7 (4 titles) ===
Outcome	No.	Year	Championship	Opponent in the final	Score
Winner	1.	2001	EBSA European Under-19 Snooker Championships	(Wales) David Donovan	6–3
Runner-up	1.	2002	EBSA European Under-19 Snooker Championships	(Scotland) Robert Shanks	3–6
Winner	2.	2005	English Open	(Hong Kong) Andy Lee	8–3
Winner	3.	2005	PIOS – Event 2	(England) James Leadbetter	6–3
Runner-up	2.	2005	PIOS – Event 4	(Republic of Ireland) Colm Gilcreest	3–6
Winner	4.	2006	English Amateur Championship	(England) Martin O'Donnell	8–3
Runner-up	3.	2025	Q Tour – Event 3	(England) Simon Blackwell	3–4
