= Stuart Carrington =

English snooker player

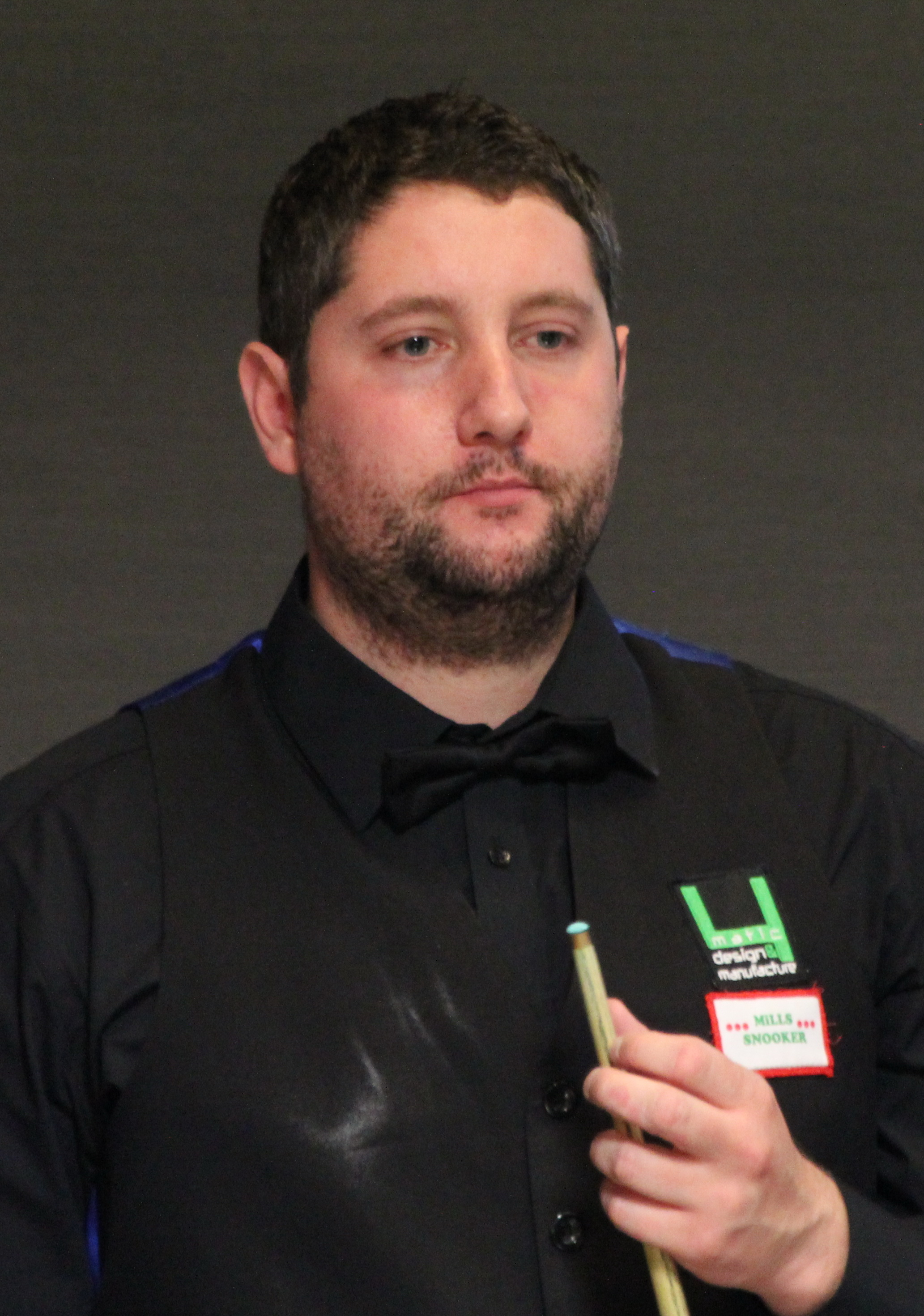
- Carrington at the 2016 Paul Hunter Classic

Personal information
- Born: 14 May 1990 (age 36) Grimsby, England

Sport
- Country: England
- Sport: Snooker
- Professional: 2011/2012, 2013–2025, 2026–present
- Highest ranking: 38 (February 2019)
- Current ranking: 124 (as of 26 October 2026)
- Century breaks: 114 (as of 25 October 2026)
- Best ranking finish: Semi-final (x2)

Stuart Carrington (born 14 May 1990) is an English professional snooker player. He practises frequently with Steven Hallworth and Ian Glover in Grimsby.

In May 2011, Carrington qualified for the 2011–12 professional Main Tour as one of four semi-finalists from the third and final 2011 Q School event.

== Career ==
=== Debut season ===
Carrington won just two matches during the 2011/2012 season. He finished the season without a world ranking and would not play on the main tour in the 2012–13 season.

=== 2012/2013 season ===
Carrington played in eight out of twelve PTC events during the 2012–13 season, with his best results being last 32 defeat at the 2012 Scottish Open earned him a place in the EBSA Qualifying Tour Play-offs. At the event Carrington beat Jeff Cundy 4–2 and Adam Wicheard 4–0 to claim a place back on the snooker tour for the 2013–14 season and 2014–15 season.

=== 2013/2014 season ===
Carrington beat Ken Doherty 6–3 to qualify for the International Championship. In his debut at a ranking event he defeated Michael Leslie 6–4, before losing 6–3 to Mark Davis in the second round. At the UK Championship, Carrington enjoyed 6–2 and 6–1 wins over Ben Woollaston and John Astley, but was then whitewashed 6–0 by Mark Selby. He met Selby once more in the first round of the China Open and lost 5–3. Carrington came close to qualifying for the World Championship as he saw off Andrew Norman 10–5, Jack Lisowski 10–7 and Nigel Bond 10–5 to reach the final round, where Ryan Day beat him 10–5.

=== 2014/2015 season ===
Carrington lost in the first round of the UK Championship and Welsh Open 6–3 to Nigel Bond and 4–3 to Marcus Campbell respectively. He reached the second round of the Indian Open due to Marco Fu's withdrawal and was beaten 4–1 by Li Hang, with his solitary frame coming courtesy of a 138 break which was the highest of the tournament. In World Championship qualifying, Carrington defeated Joel Walker 10–6 and Peter Ebdon 10–7 to reach the final round for the second year in a row. He made a century break to force a decider against Li Hang which Carrington won and he made his debut in the event against Judd Trump. Carrington lost the first session 7–2 and then won three of the first four frames of the second, but went on to be beaten 10–6, despite coming close to making his first Crucible century with efforts of 99 and 97. Carrington broke into the top 64 in the end of season rankings as the world number 63.

=== 2015/2016 season ===
At the Paul Hunter Classic Carrington knocked out Tony Drago, Mike Dunn, Matthew Stevens and Mark Davis to reach the quarter-finals of a professional event for the first time, where he lost 4–2 to Shaun Murphy. Murphy also ended his tournament at the last 16 of the Bulgarian Open and Carrington would go on to finish 34th on the European Order of Merit. He held on from 4–1 up on Liam Highfield to win 6–4 in the first round of the UK Championship, before losing 6–3 to Judd Trump. After narrowly overcoming Jamie Cope 5–4, Carrington beat five-time world champion Ronnie O'Sullivan 5–3 to qualify for the German Masters. There, he squandered a 3–0 lead over Mark King to lose 5–4. He also lost in the second round of the Welsh Open 4–1 to Neil Robertson. Carrington qualified for the China Open but was forced to withdraw from the event due to illness.

=== 2016/2017 season ===
Carrington won three matches to qualify for the Shanghai Masters and, after coming through a wildcard round, he was 4–2 down to Joe Perry. However, he then restricted Perry to just seven points as he knocked in breaks of 78, 85 and 100 to progress 5–4. In the second round he was beaten 5–3 by Mark Selby. At the Welsh Open, Carrington defeated Sam Craigie 4–2, Wang Yuchen 4–2, Robin Hull 4–0 and Igor Figueiredo 4–1 to make it to the first ranking event quarter-final of his career and was 4–0 behind to Stuart Bingham. Carrington rallied to trail by a single frame, but lost a long eighth in a 5–3 defeat. Carrington eliminated Alex Borg 10–2, Andrew Higginson 10–6 and Mark Williams 10–7 to qualify for his second World Championship and he played Liang Wenbo in the first round. From 2–2, Carrington made three centuries in a row, before his lead was cut to 5–4 after the first session. He became the fifth player to have made three successive tons at the Crucible after John Higgins, Ronnie O'Sullivan, Mark Selby and Neil Robertson. The second session lacked the quality of the first with Liang triumphing 10–7.

== Performance and rankings timeline ==
Tournament	2010/ 11	2011/ 12	2012/ 13	2013/ 14	2014/ 15	2015/ 16	2016/ 17	2017/ 18	2018/ 19	2019/ 20	2020/ 21	2021/ 22	2022/ 23	2023/ 24	2024/ 25	2025/ 26	2026/ 27
Ranking (Note: It shows the ranking at the beginning of the season)	(Note: He was an amateur)	(Note: New players on the Main Tour don't have a ranking)			79	63	64	46	50	50	46	47	64	(Note: Players qualified through Q School started the season without ranking points)	72		
Ranking tournaments
Championship League	Non-Ranking Event										RR	2R	RR	RR	2R	RR	RR
China Open	A	LQ	A	1R	LQ	WD	1R	LQ	2R	Tournament Not Held							LQ
Wuhan Open	Tournament Not Held													1R	WD	A	LQ
British Open	Tournament Not Held											1R	LQ	LQ	WD	A	LQ
English Open	Tournament Not Held						2R	3R	2R	1R	WD	1R	1R	1R	LQ	A	LQ
Shenzhen Open (Note: The event was called the Xi'an Grand Prix (2024/2025–2025/2026))	Tournament Not Held														WD	A	LQ
Northern Ireland Open	Tournament Not Held						1R	2R	2R	3R	2R	LQ	LQ	LQ	LQ	A	LQ
International Championship	Not Held		A	2R	LQ	LQ	1R	LQ	3R	1R	Not Held			1R	1R	A	1R
UK Championship	A	LQ	A	3R	1R	2R	1R	1R	1R	2R	2R	2R	LQ	LQ	LQ	A	
Shoot Out	Non-Ranking Event						2R	4R	1R	1R	1R	1R	1R	1R	1R	2R	
Scottish Open	Not Held		MR	Not Held			2R	3R	QF	2R	1R	1R	1R	LQ	1R	LQ	LQ
German Masters	A	LQ	A	LQ	LQ	1R	1R	LQ	LQ	LQ	2R	LQ	LQ	LQ	LQ	A	
Welsh Open	A	LQ	A	1R	1R	2R	QF	2R	1R	2R	2R	LQ	2R	1R	1R	A	
World Grand Prix	Tournament Not Held				NR	DNQ	DNQ	DNQ	1R	DNQ	DNQ	DNQ	DNQ	DNQ	DNQ	DNQ	
Players Championship (Note: The event was called the Players Tour Championship Grand Final (2010/2011–2015/2016))	DNQ	DNQ	DNQ	DNQ	DNQ	DNQ	DNQ	DNQ	DNQ	DNQ	DNQ	DNQ	DNQ	DNQ	DNQ	DNQ	
World Open	A	LQ	A	LQ	Not Held		1R	A	1R	2R	Not Held			1R	1R	A	
Tour Championship	Tournament Not Held								DNQ	DNQ	DNQ	DNQ	DNQ	DNQ	DNQ	DNQ	
World Championship	A	LQ	A	LQ	1R	LQ	1R	1R	LQ	LQ	LQ	LQ	LQ	LQ	LQ	LQ	
Non-ranking tournaments
Championship League	A	A	A	A	A	A	A	A	A	RR	A	A	A	A	A	A	
Former ranking tournaments
Wuxi Classic	Non-Ranking		A	LQ	LQ	Tournament Not Held											
Australian Goldfields Open	NH	LQ	A	LQ	LQ	LQ	Tournament Not Held										
Shanghai Masters	A	LQ	A	A	LQ	LQ	2R	1R	Non-Ranking		Not Held			Non-Ranking Event			
Paul Hunter Classic	Minor-Ranking Event						2R	3R	WD	NR	Tournament Not Held						
Indian Open	Not Held			LQ	2R	NH	1R	A	1R	Tournament Not Held							
Riga Masters (Note: The event was called the Riga Open (2014/2015–2015/2016))	Tournament Not Held				Minor-Ranking		2R	1R	SF	QF	Tournament Not Held						
China Championship	Tournament Not Held						NR	1R	1R	LQ	Tournament Not Held						
WST Pro Series	Tournament Not Held										2R	Tournament Not Held					
Turkish Masters	Tournament Not Held											1R	Tournament Not Held				
Gibraltar Open	Tournament Not Held					MR	WD	2R	A	A	SF	2R	Tournament Not Held				
WST Classic	Tournament Not Held												2R	Tournament Not Held			
European Masters	Tournament Not Held						LQ	LQ	1R	A	1R	1R	2R	LQ	Not Held		
Saudi Arabia Masters	Tournament Not Held														3R	A	NH
Former non-ranking tournaments
Shoot Out	A	A	A	A	A	2R	Ranking Event										

Performance Table Legend
LQ	lost in the qualifying draw	#R	lost in the early rounds of the tournament (WR = Wildcard round, RR = Round robin)	QF	lost in the quarter-finals
SF	lost in the semi-finals	F	lost in the final	W	won the tournament
DNQ	did not qualify for the tournament	A	did not participate in the tournament	WD	withdrew from the tournament

NH / Not Held	means an event was not held.
NR / Non-Ranking Event	means an event is/was no longer a ranking event.
R / Ranking Event	means an event is/was a ranking event.
MR / Minor-Ranking Event	means an event is/was a minor-ranking event.

== Career finals ==
=== Pro-am finals: 1 (1 title) ===
Outcome	No.	Year	Championship	Opponent in the final	Score
Winner	1.	2013	Paul Hunter English Open	(England) Craig Steadman	5–3

=== Amateur finals: 7 (2 titles) ===
Outcome	No.	Year	Championship	Opponent in the final	Score
Runner-up	1.	2002	English Under-13 Championship	(England) Judd Trump	0–5
Runner-up	2.	2004	English Under-15 Championship	(England) Judd Trump	0–5
Runner-up	3.	2005	English Under-15 Championship (2)	(England) Judd Trump	2–5
Winner	1.	2006	Junior Pot Black	(Scotland) Anthony McGill	1–0
Runner-up	4.	2009	English Under-19 Championship	(England) Liam Highfield	3–8
Winner	2.	2013	English Amateur Championship	(England) Ben Harrison	10–2
Runner-up	5.	2025	Q Tour - Event 5	(Wales) Jamie Clarke	2–4
