= Adam Wicheard =

English snooker player

Personal information
- Born: 23 August 1985 (age 41) Bath, Somerset, England

Sport
- Country: England
- Sport: Snooker
- Professional: 2010–2012
- Highest ranking: 84 (June–July 2011, February–March 2012)
- Best ranking finish: Last 32 (2012 Welsh Open)

Adam Wicheard (born 23 August 1985) is an English former professional snooker player, who competed professionally between 2010 and 2012.

== Career ==
He was selected to compete in the World Under-21s in 2005 and was progressing towards turning professional, until he experienced severe back pains while competing at a festival in Pontins. An MRI scan revealed that he had a ruptured tumour in his spine, which required an emergency seven-hour operation followed by six months of recovery in hospital, with Wicheard lying flat in bed unable to move for the first four months. He was warned by doctors that he might never walk again, but fought back by undergoing extensive physiotherapy—and later finished first in the 2009/10 English rankings, to turn professional for the following season.

However, Wicheard failed to perform well enough during the season to automatically retain his place on the World Snooker Tour, but did win all his matches at the first event of the 2011 Q School to earn a berth for the 2011/12 season. In February 2012, he qualified for the main stage of a ranking event for the very first time by coming through four qualification matches, culminating with a 4–2 victory over world number 22 Marcus Campbell to reach the last 32 of the Welsh Open. In the remainder of the season Wicheard could only win one more qualifying match and finished the year without a ranking, meaning he entered Q School in a bid to earn a place to play the 2012–13 season. Wicheard played in all three Q School events but could not win enough games in any of them and dropped off the main snooker tour. Confined to entering Players Tour Championship events for the 2012/2013 season, Wicheard played in nine of them, with his best results coming in European Tour Event 5 and Event 6 where he lost in the second round to Jimmy Robertson and Ken Doherty respectively. He finished the season 97th on the PTC Order of Merit. Wicheard reached the final round of the 2013 Q School to stand one win away from rejoining the tour. He was 3–2 down to Chris Wakelin, before his cue of 15 years snapped in half which forced him to concede the match.

Wicheard's high Q School Order of Merit placing enabled him to play in the qualifying rounds of five ranking tournaments in the 2013–14 season. The only one he reached was the 2014 World Open by beating Liu Chuang 5–2, but he was whitewashed 5–0 by Mark Davis in the first round. He received automatic entry into the Welsh Open and was defeated 4–3 by Matthew Stevens in the first round. Wicheard entered Q School at the end of the season but could only win one match in the two events. He has not played in a professional event since.

== Performance and rankings timeline ==
Tournament	2010/ 11	2011/ 12	2012/ 13	2013/ 14
Ranking (Note: It shows the ranking at the beginning of the season)	(Note: New players on the Main Tour do not have a ranking)	(Note: Players qualified through Q School started the season without ranking points)	(Note: He was an amateur)	
Ranking tournaments
Wuxi Classic	Non-Ranking		A	LQ
Australian Goldfields Open	NH	LQ	A	A
Shanghai Masters	LQ	LQ	A	A
UK Championship	LQ	LQ	A	A
German Masters	LQ	LQ	A	LQ
Welsh Open	LQ	1R	A	LQ
World Open	LQ	LQ	A	1R
Players Tour Championship Grand Final	DNQ	DNQ	DNQ	DNQ
China Open	LQ	LQ	A	LQ
World Championship	LQ	LQ	A	A

Performance Table Legend
LQ	lost in the qualifying draw	#R	lost in the early rounds of the tournament (WR = Wildcard round, RR = Round robin)	QF	lost in the quarter-finals
SF	lost in the semi-finals	F	lost in the final	W	won the tournament
DNQ	did not qualify for the tournament	A	did not participate in the tournament	WD	withdrew from the tournament

NH / Not Held	means an event was not held
NR / Non-Ranking Event	means an event is/was no longer a ranking event
R / Ranking Event	means an event is/was a ranking event
MR / Minor-Ranking Event	means an event is/was a minor-ranking event

== Career finals ==
=== Amateur finals: 1 ===
Outcome	No.	Year	Championship	Opponent in the final	Score
Runner-up	1.	2000	English Under-17 Championship	(England) Kurt Maflin	2–5
