= Lucky Vatnani =

Indian snooker player

Personal information
- Born: 23 December 1985 (age 40) Hyderabad, India

Sport
- Country: India
- Sport: Snooker
- Professional: 2011/2012
- Highest ranking: 85 (May–July 2012)

Lucky Vatnani (born 23 December 1985) is an Indian former professional snooker player. He is from Hyderabad, India, but was based in Sheffield, England during his snooker career.

== Career ==
Vantani, a graduate from Sheffield Hallam University in Business Administration, lost a 5–6 loss in the final of the 2010 Indian Championship to Pankaj Advani in 2010 Indian Championship, and reached the last 16 of the IBSF World Snooker Championship in 2009. He won the gold medal in the British University Snooker Championships during the same year.

In 2011, he won a place on the World Snooker Tour for the 2011–12 season. However, he missed several events due to visa issues and would struggle and only won two matches, both in the qualifying stages of the Welsh Open and with three consecutive defeats to Adam Duffy in the first round of the World Open, China Open and World Snooker Championship ensured he was unable to reach the top 64 and therefore dropped of the tour at the end of the season.

Vantani competed as an amateur in the preliminary rounds of the 2013 World Snooker Championship, but lost 5–3 to Paul Wykes.

Vantanu entered the 2018 Q School in a bid to re-enter the professional snooker tour.

== Performance and rankings timeline ==
Tournament	2010/ 11	2011/ 12	2012/ 13	2016/ 17	2017/ 18	2018/ 19
Ranking (Note: It shows the ranking at the beginning of the season)	(Note: He was an amateur)	(Note: New players on the Main Tour don't have a ranking)				
Ranking tournaments
World Open	A	LQ	A	A	A	A
UK Championship	A	LQ	A	A	A	A
German Masters	A	LQ	A	A	A	A
World Grand Prix	Tournament Not Held			DNQ	DNQ	DNQ
Welsh Open	A	LQ	A	A	A	A
Indian Open	Tournament Not Held			WR	LQ	LQ
Players Championship (Note: The event was called the Players Tour Championship Grand Finals (2010/2011–2012/2013))	DNQ	DNQ	DNQ	DNQ	DNQ	DNQ
China Open	A	LQ	A	A	A	A
World Championship	A	LQ	LQ	A	A	A
Former ranking tournaments
Australian Goldfields Open	NH	WD	A	Tournament Not Held		
Shanghai Masters	A	WD	A	A	A	NR

Performance Table Legend
LQ	lost in the qualifying draw	#R	lost in the early rounds of the tournament (WR = Wildcard round, RR = Round robin)	QF	lost in the quarter-finals
SF	lost in the semi-finals	F	lost in the final	W	won the tournament
DNQ	did not qualify for the tournament	A	did not participate in the tournament	WD	withdrew from the tournament

NH / Not Held	means an event was not held.
NR / Non-Ranking Event	means an event is/was no longer a ranking event.
R / Ranking Event	means an event is/was a ranking event.
MR / Minor-Ranking Event	means an event is/was a minor-ranking event.

== Amateur Year by Year Performances ==
Vatnani's achievements include:

- 2013 APBSA Snooker event – Winner
- 2013 Film Nagar Snooker event – Winner
- 2013 Simply Snooker Academy event – Winner
- 2013 All India Bhimavaram Invitational Snooker event – Winner
- 2010 77th Indian National Snooker Championship – Runner-up
- 2009 BUCS Singles Snooker Championship – Gold Medalist
- 2008 3rd PCL-Manisha Invitation Snooker Championship – Runner-up
- 2008 Siri Fort Handicap Snooker Championship – Winner
- 2006 AP State Senior Billiards & Snooker Championship – Winner
- 2006 AP State Snooker (U-21) Champion
- 2005 AP State Snooker (U-21) Champion
- 2004 AP State Snooker (U-21) Champion
- 2003 AP State Snooker (U-21) Champion
- 2002 AP State Snooker (U-21) Champion
- 2001 AP State Snooker (U-21) Champion
