= 2013 China Open (snooker) =

Bank of Beijing China Open

Tournament information
- Dates: 25–31 March 2013
- Venue: Beijing University Students' Gymnasium
- City: Beijing
- Country: China
- Organisation: World Snooker
- Format: Ranking event
- Total prize fund: £425,000
- Winner's share: £85,000
- Highest break: Jimmy Robertson (ENG) (142)

Final
- Champion: Neil Robertson (AUS)
- Runner-up: Mark Selby (ENG)
- Score: 10–6

The 2013 Bank of Beijing China Open was a professional ranking snooker tournament that took place between 25 and 31 March 2013 at the Beijing University Students' Gymnasium in Beijing, China. It was the tenth ranking event of the 2012–13 season.

Peter Ebdon was the defending champion, but he lost 3–5 against Marcus Campbell in the last 32.

Mark Selby attempted a maximum break in his last 32 match against Mark King, but missed the final black at 140. Thus he became the fourth player along with Ken Doherty, Barry Pinches and Robin Hull to do so in a professional tournament.

Neil Robertson won his seventh ranking title by defeating Selby 10–6 in the final.

== Prize fund ==
The breakdown of prize money for this year is shown below:

- Winner: £85,000
- Runner-up: £35,000
- Semi-final: £20,000
- Quarter-final: £11,000
- Last 16: £7,500
- Last 32: £6,000
- Last 48: £2,300
- Last 64: £1,500
- Non-televised highest break: £700
- Televised highest break: £3,500
- Total: £425,000

== Wildcard round ==
These matches were played in Beijing on 25 and 26 March.

Match		Score	
WC1	Anthony McGill (SCO)	5–3	Ehsan Heydari Nezhad (IRI)
WC2	Jimmy Robertson (ENG)	5–1	Wang Yuchen (CHN)
WC3	Liang Wenbo (CHN)	5–1	Lu Ning (CHN)
WC4	Jack Lisowski (ENG)	5–1	Zhou Yuelong (CHN)
WC5	Dechawat Poomjaeng (THA)	5–2	Zhu Yinghui (CHN)
WC6	Rory McLeod (ENG)	5–1	Hu Hao (CHN)
WC7	Mark Joyce (ENG)	w/d–w/o	Lyu Haotian (CHN)
WC8	Jamie Cope (ENG)	2–5	Zhao Xintong (CHN)

== Main draw ==
Last 32; Best of 9 frames
1	(England) Peter Ebdon	3
(Scotland) Marcus Campbell	5
14	(Scotland) Graeme Dott	5
(Hong Kong) Marco Fu	3
9	(Northern Ireland) Mark Allen	5
(Scotland) Anthony McGill	1
6	(Australia) Neil Robertson	5
(England) Jimmy Robertson	0
7	(Scotland) Stephen Maguire	5
(England) Michael Holt	3
11	(China) Ding Junhui	3
(England) Barry Hawkins	5
10	(England) Stuart Bingham	5
(China) Liang Wenbo	3
4	(Scotland) John Higgins	4
(England) Robert Milkins	5
3	(England) Judd Trump	3
(England) Jack Lisowski	5
16	(England) Mark Davis	5
(Thailand) Dechawat Poomjaeng	3
13	(Wales) Matthew Stevens	2
(England) Rory McLeod	5
5	(England) Shaun Murphy	5
(England) Andrew Higginson	3
8	(Wales) Mark Williams	5
(China) Lyu Haotian	2
15	(England) Ali Carter	5
(China) Zhao Xintong	2
12	(England) Ricky Walden	5
(Republic of Ireland) Ken Doherty	2
2	(England) Mark Selby	5
(England) Mark King	1

Last 16; Best of 9 frames
(Scotland) Marcus Campbell	5
14	(Scotland) Graeme Dott	4
9	(Northern Ireland) Mark Allen	1
6	(Australia) Neil Robertson	5
7	(Scotland) Stephen Maguire	5
(England) Barry Hawkins	1
10	(England) Stuart Bingham	5
(England) Robert Milkins	3
(England) Jack Lisowski	5
16	(England) Mark Davis	4
(England) Rory McLeod	3
5	(England) Shaun Murphy	5
8	(Wales) Mark Williams	5
15	(England) Ali Carter	4
12	(England) Ricky Walden	2
2	(England) Mark Selby	5

Quarter-finals; Best of 9 frames
(Scotland) Marcus Campbell	2
6	(Australia) Neil Robertson	5
7	(Scotland) Stephen Maguire	5
10	(England) Stuart Bingham	1
(England) Jack Lisowski	4
5	(England) Shaun Murphy	5
8	(Wales) Mark Williams	1
2	(England) Mark Selby	5

Semi-finals; Best of 11 frames
6	(Australia) Neil Robertson	6
7	(Scotland) Stephen Maguire	5
5	(England) Shaun Murphy	2
2	(England) Mark Selby	6

Final; Best of 19 frames
6	(Australia) Neil Robertson	10
2	(England) Mark Selby	6

== Final ==
Final: Best of 19 frames. Referee: Eirian Williams. Beijing University Students' Gymnasium, Beijing, China, 31 March 2013.
Neil Robertson (6); Australia	10–6	Mark Selby (2); England
Afternoon: 0–100 (58), 78–16 (50), 91–31 (91), 71–68, 59–47, 84–40, 74–8; Evening: 29–82 (81), 0–125 (125), 50–79 (66), 133–0 (110), 60–34, 90–0 (90), 0–117 (116), 0–91 (63), 80–39
110	Highest break	125
1	Century breaks	2
4	50+ breaks	6

== Qualifying ==
These matches took place between 9 and 12 January 2013 at the World Snooker Academy in Sheffield, England.

Round 1 Best of 9 frames
(Norway) Kurt Maflin	5
(England) Michael Wild	2
(China) Li Yan	2
(Wales) Daniel Wells	5
(India) Pankaj Advani	4
(England) David Grace	5
(England) Robbie Williams	5
(Egypt) Mohamed Khairy	1
(England) Paul Davison	5
(England) Joel Walker	3
(China) Zhang Anda	4
(Scotland) Fraser Patrick	5
(Thailand) Thanawat Thirapongpaiboon	5
(England) Justin Astley	1
(Malta) Tony Drago	5
(Wales) Gareth Allen	3
(England) Ian Burns	5
(Scotland) Michael Leslie	2
(Thailand) Dechawat Poomjaeng	5
(England) Sam Baird	4
(England) Craig Steadman	2
(England) Sean O'Sullivan	5
(China) Tian Pengfei	5
(England) Martin O'Donnell	1
(India) Aditya Mehta	5
(England) Simon Bedford	0
(China) Chen Zhe	5
(Scotland) Scott Donaldson	4
(England) Michael Wasley	5
(England) Jamie O'Neill	4
(England) Liam Highfield	5
(Thailand) Passakorn Suwannawat	2

Round 2 Best of 9 frames
(Thailand) James Wattana	1
(Norway) Kurt Maflin	5
(China) Liu Chuang	5
(Wales) Daniel Wells	2
(Scotland) Anthony McGill	5
(England) David Grace	2
(England) Jimmy White	1
(England) Robbie Williams	5
(England) Adam Duffy	3
(England) Paul Davison	5
(England) Barry Pinches	5
(Scotland) Fraser Patrick	0
(Belgium) Luca Brecel	2
(Thailand) Thanawat Thirapongpaiboon	5
(Scotland) Alan McManus	4
(Malta) Tony Drago	5
(England) Rod Lawler	1
(England) Ian Burns	5
(China) Cao Yupeng	4
(Thailand) Dechawat Poomjaeng	5
(England) Alfie Burden	1
(England) Sean O'Sullivan	5
(England) Peter Lines	1
(China) Tian Pengfei	5
(England) Mark Joyce	5
(India) Aditya Mehta	3
(Thailand) Thepchaiya Un-Nooh	3
(China) Chen Zhe	5
(England) Andy Hicks	5
(England) Michael Wasley	2
(England) Mike Dunn	5
(England) Liam Highfield	3

Round 3 Best of 9 frames
(China) Xiao Guodong	5
(Norway) Kurt Maflin	4
(Wales) Jamie Jones	5
(China) Liu Chuang	4
(China) Yu Delu	1
(Scotland) Anthony McGill	5
(England) Jimmy Robertson	5
(England) Robbie Williams	3
(England) Anthony Hamilton	5
(England) Paul Davison	1
(England) Matthew Selt	5
(England) Barry Pinches	3
(China) Liang Wenbo	5
(Thailand) Thanawat Thirapongpaiboon	3
(England) Nigel Bond	5
(Malta) Tony Drago	3
(England) Jack Lisowski	5
(England) Ian Burns	2
(England) Ben Woollaston	3
(Thailand) Dechawat Poomjaeng	5
(England) Rory McLeod	5
(England) Sean O'Sullivan	3
(England) David Gilbert	5
(China) Tian Pengfei	3
(Northern Ireland) Gerard Greene	2
(England) Mark Joyce	5
(Wales) Michael White	4
(China) Chen Zhe	5
(England) Dave Harold	5
(England) Andy Hicks	3
(England) Steve Davis	5
(England) Mike Dunn	3

Round 4 Best of 9 frames
(Scotland) Marcus Campbell	5
(China) Xiao Guodong	4
(Hong Kong) Marco Fu	5
(Wales) Jamie Jones	0
(England) Martin Gould	2
(Scotland) Anthony McGill	5
(England) Joe Perry	1
(England) Jimmy Robertson	5
(England) Michael Holt	5
(England) Anthony Hamilton	2
(England) Barry Hawkins	5
(England) Matthew Selt	1
(England) Tom Ford	1
(China) Liang Wenbo	5
(England) Robert Milkins	5
(England) Nigel Bond	1
(Scotland) Jamie Burnett	3
(England) Jack Lisowski	5
(Republic of Ireland) Fergal O'Brien	1
(Thailand) Dechawat Poomjaeng	5
(Wales) Ryan Day	2
(England) Rory McLeod	5
(England) Andrew Higginson	5
(England) David Gilbert	2
(Wales) Dominic Dale	4
(England) Mark Joyce	5
(England) Jamie Cope	5
(China) Chen Zhe	4
(Republic of Ireland) Ken Doherty	5
(England) Dave Harold	3
(England) Mark King	5
(England) Steve Davis	0

== Century breaks ==
=== Qualifying stage centuries ===
- 142, 103 – Sean O'Sullivan
- 141 – Marcus Campbell
- 140 – Chen Zhe
- 130 – Michael Holt
- 130 – Dave Harold
- 127 – Marco Fu
- 126 – Tian Pengfei
- 122 – Aditya Mehta
- 115, 114, 102 – Anthony McGill
- 108 – Andy Hicks
- 107 – Michael Wild
- 104, 102 – Kurt Maflin
- 103 – Liang Wenbo
- 100 – Robbie Williams
- 100 – Steve Davis

=== Televised stage centuries ===
- 142, 126, 121 – Jimmy Robertson
- 140, 125, 116, 111, 104 – Mark Selby
- 138, 113, 113, 110, 110 – Neil Robertson
- 137, 124 – Shaun Murphy
- 136, 108 – Mark Williams
- 134, 110 – Rory McLeod
- 134 – Stuart Bingham
- 133, 102 – Stephen Maguire
- 131, 102 – Jack Lisowski
- 129 – Mark Allen
- 126 – Liang Wenbo
- 116 – John Higgins
- 109 – Robert Milkins
- 108 – Barry Hawkins
- 105, 101 – Michael Holt
