= 2012 China Open (snooker) =

Bank of Beijing China Open

Tournament information
- Dates: 26 March – 1 April 2012
- Venue: Beijing University Students' Gymnasium
- City: Beijing
- Country: China
- Organisation: World Snooker
- Format: Ranking event
- Total prize fund: £400,000
- Winner's share: £75,000
- Highest break: Mark Selby (ENG) (139)

Final
- Champion: Peter Ebdon (ENG)
- Runner-up: Stephen Maguire (SCO)
- Score: 10–9

The 2012 Bank of Beijing China Open was a professional ranking snooker tournament that took place between 26 March and 1 April 2012 at the Beijing University Students' Gymnasium in Beijing, China.

Judd Trump was the defending champion, but he lost in the quarter-finals 3–5 against Stephen Lee.

Mark Selby withdrew from his second round match against Ding Junhui due to a neck injury.

Peter Ebdon won his ninth and final ranking title by defeating Stephen Maguire 10–9 in the final.

== Prize fund ==
The breakdown of prize money for this year is shown below:

- Winner: £75,000
- Runner-up: £30,000
- Semi-final: £18,000
- Quarter-final: £10,000
- Last 16: £7,500
- Last 32: £6,000
- Last 48: £2,300
- Last 64: £1,500
- Stage one highest break: £200
- Stage two highest break: £2,000
- Total: £400,000

== Wildcard round ==
These matches were played in Beijing on 26 and 27 March.

Match		Score	
WC1	Jimmy White (ENG)	5–3	Omar Alkojah (SYR)
WC2	Mark King (ENG)	5–3	Zhu Yinghui (CHN)
WC3	Fergal O'Brien (IRL)	4–5	Jin Long (CHN)
WC4	Michael Holt (ENG)	3–5	Li Hang (CHN)
WC5	Ben Woollaston (ENG)	5–1	Chen Feilong (CHN)
WC6	Jamie Jones (WAL)	3–5	Lu Ning (CHN)
WC7	Peter Ebdon (ENG)	5–2	Lyu Haotian (CHN)
WC8	Rory McLeod (ENG)	5–0	Zhou Yuelong (CHN)

== Main draw ==
Last 32; Best of 9 frames
1	(England) Judd Trump	5
(England) Jimmy White	3
14	(England) Stuart Bingham	5
(England) Joe Perry	4
15	(England) Stephen Lee	5
(England) Tom Ford	1
7	(Scotland) Graeme Dott	5
(England) Mark King	2
8	(Scotland) Stephen Maguire	5
(England) Barry Hawkins	1
10	(Northern Ireland) Mark Allen	2
(England) Ricky Walden	5
16	(England) Ronnie O'Sullivan	5
(Scotland) Marcus Campbell	4
4	(Wales) Mark Williams	5
(China) Jin Long	1
3	(England) Mark Selby	5
(China) Li Hang	0
9	(China) Ding Junhui	5
(England) Ben Woollaston	4
11	(England) Ali Carter	5
(Wales) Dominic Dale	4
6	(England) Shaun Murphy	2
(China) Lu Ning	5
5	(Australia) Neil Robertson	5
(England) Jamie Cope	4
12	(England) Martin Gould	4
(Scotland) Stephen Hendry	5
13	(Wales) Matthew Stevens	3
(England) Peter Ebdon	5
2	(Scotland) John Higgins	5
(England) Rory McLeod	1

Last 16; Best of 9 frames
1	(England) Judd Trump	5
14	(England) Stuart Bingham	3
15	(England) Stephen Lee	5
7	(Scotland) Graeme Dott	3
8	(Scotland) Stephen Maguire	5
(England) Ricky Walden	4
16	(England) Ronnie O'Sullivan	5
4	(Wales) Mark Williams	1
3	(England) Mark Selby	w/d
9	(China) Ding Junhui	w/o
11	(England) Ali Carter	5
(China) Lu Ning	1
5	(Australia) Neil Robertson	5
(Scotland) Stephen Hendry	3
(England) Peter Ebdon	5
2	(Scotland) John Higgins	4

Quarter-finals; Best of 9 frames
1	(England) Judd Trump	3
15	(England) Stephen Lee	5
8	(Scotland) Stephen Maguire	5
16	(England) Ronnie O'Sullivan	4
9	(China) Ding Junhui	5
11	(England) Ali Carter	2
5	(Australia) Neil Robertson	3
(England) Peter Ebdon	5

Semi-finals; Best of 11 frames
15	(England) Stephen Lee	2
8	(Scotland) Stephen Maguire	6
9	(China) Ding Junhui	3
(England) Peter Ebdon	6

Final; Best of 19 frames
8	(Scotland) Stephen Maguire	9
(England) Peter Ebdon	10

== Final ==
Final: Best of 19 frames. Referee: Jan Verhaas. Beijing University Students' Gymnasium, Beijing, China, 1 April 2012.
Stephen Maguire (8); Scotland	9–10	Peter Ebdon; England
Afternoon: 27–63, 61–1 (53), 0–108 (107), 55–72 (64), 36–74, 0–124 (124); Evening: 84–32 (84), 14–60 (52), 57–44, 98–0 (98), 0–103 (103), 74–3 (65), 29–98 (65), 75–18 (70), 76–0, 97–0 (97), 4–103 (103), 66–49, 24–62
98	Highest break	124
0	Century breaks	4
6	50+ breaks	7

== Qualifying ==
These matches took place between 21 and 24 February 2012 at the World Snooker Academy, Sheffield, England.

Round 1 Best of 9 frames
(Wales) Andrew Pagett	4
(Belgium) Luca Brecel	5
(England) David Grace	5
(Wales) Daniel Wells	1
(England) Andrew Norman	5
(England) Stuart Carrington	3
(England) Sam Craigie	5
(England) Adam Wicheard	3
(Republic of Ireland) David Morris	5
(England) Paul Davison	4
(China) Tian Pengfei	5
(England) Sam Baird	0
(Norway) Kurt Maflin	4
(China) Cao Yupeng	5
(Thailand) Passakorn Suwannawat	4
(India) Aditya Mehta	5
(China) Yu Delu	5
(Poland) Kacper Filipiak	0
(England) Adam Duffy	5
(India) Lucky Vatnani	0

Round 2 Best of 9 frames
(Thailand) James Wattana	2
(England) Liam Highfield	5
(England) Andy Hicks	3
(Belgium) Luca Brecel	5
(England) Barry Pinches	3
(England) David Grace	5
(England) Adrian Gunnell	5
(Northern Ireland) Joe Swail	0
(China) Liu Chuang	5
(England) Andrew Norman	2
(China) Liu Song	1
(England) Sam Craigie	5
(Wales) Michael White	5
(England) David Gilbert	0
(China) Li Yan	5
(England) Ian McCulloch	4
(England) Peter Lines	5
(Republic of Ireland) David Morris	1
(England) Ben Woollaston	5
(China) Tian Pengfei	3
(England) Dave Harold	5
(England) Alfie Burden	3
(Malta) Tony Drago	3
(China) Cao Yupeng	5
(Scotland) Anthony McGill	3
(India) Aditya Mehta	5
(England) Mark Joyce	2
(China) Yu Delu	5
(China) Xiao Guodong	5
(England) Adam Duffy	1
(England) Jimmy Robertson	4
(England) Rod Lawler	5

Round 3 Best of 9 frames
(England) Jimmy White	5
(England) Liam Highfield	3
(England) Anthony Hamilton	5
(Belgium) Luca Brecel	3
(England) Matthew Selt	4
(England) David Grace	5
(England) Joe Jogia	2
(England) Adrian Gunnell	5
(England) Robert Milkins	2
(China) Liu Chuang	5
(Northern Ireland) Gerard Greene	3
(England) Sam Craigie	5
(Republic of Ireland) Ken Doherty	5
(Wales) Michael White	4
(England) Mike Dunn	4
(China) Li Yan	5
(England) Michael Holt	5
(England) Peter Lines	1
(England) Nigel Bond	2
(England) Ben Woollaston	5
(England) Jack Lisowski	5
(England) Dave Harold	3
(Wales) Jamie Jones	5
(China) Cao Yupeng	3
(Scotland) Alan McManus	5
(India) Aditya Mehta	3
(Scotland) Jamie Burnett	1
(China) Yu Delu	5
(China) Liang Wenbo	5
(China) Xiao Guodong	2
(England) Steve Davis	5
(England) Rod Lawler	4

Round 4 Best of 9 frames
(England) Andrew Higginson	3
(England) Jimmy White	5
(England) Joe Perry	5
(England) Anthony Hamilton	1
(England) Tom Ford	5
(England) David Grace	4
(England) Mark King	5
(England) Adrian Gunnell	1
(England) Barry Hawkins	5
(China) Liu Chuang	0
(England) Ricky Walden	5
(England) Sam Craigie	3
(Scotland) Marcus Campbell	5
(Republic of Ireland) Ken Doherty	2
(Republic of Ireland) Fergal O'Brien	5
(China) Li Yan	4
(England) Mark Davis	4
(England) Michael Holt	5
(Wales) Ryan Day	4
(England) Ben Woollaston	5
(Wales) Dominic Dale	5
(England) Jack Lisowski	2
(Hong Kong) Marco Fu	1
(Wales) Jamie Jones	5
(England) Jamie Cope	5
(Scotland) Alan McManus	4
(Scotland) Stephen Hendry	5
(China) Yu Delu	1
(England) Peter Ebdon	5
(China) Liang Wenbo	0
(England) Rory McLeod	5
(England) Steve Davis	1

== Century breaks ==
=== Qualifying stage centuries ===
- 139 – Adam Duffy
- 137, 129, 129, 105 – Sam Craigie
- 130, 123, 118, 107 – Cao Yupeng
- 129 – Yu Delu
- 128, 108 – Alfie Burden
- 124 – Nigel Bond
- 124 – Dominic Dale
- 122 – Tom Ford
- 121 – Xiao Guodong
- 119 – David Morris
- 116 – James Wattana
- 115 – Luca Brecel
- 112, 103 – Michael White
- 112 – Andrew Norman
- 108 – Adrian Gunnell
- 106 – Aditya Mehta
- 105 – Alan McManus
- 104 – Ryan Day
- 104 – Ricky Walden
- 103, 100 – Jamie Cope
- 103, 101, 100 – Jack Lisowski
- 103 – Gerard Greene
- 102 – Jamie Jones
- 101 – Anthony Hamilton
- 101 – Peter Ebdon
- 100 – Joe Perry

=== Televised stage centuries ===
- 139 – Mark Selby
- 135 – Stephen Hendry
- 132 – Stephen Maguire
- 127 – Matthew Stevens
- 124, 109, 107, 104, 103, 103 – Peter Ebdon
- 122 – Judd Trump
- 119, 114 – Lu Ning
- 119, 102 – Ali Carter
- 116 – Joe Perry
- 113, 107, 100 – Stephen Lee
- 111 – Ding Junhui
- 107 – John Higgins
- 105 – Martin Gould
- 104, 103 – Stuart Bingham
- 104 – Jimmy White
- 102 – Ronnie O'Sullivan
