= 2010 Beijing International Challenge =

Beijing International Challenge
Tournament information
- Dates: 19–25 July 2010
- Venue: Beijing University Students' Gymnasium
- City: Beijing
- Country: China
- Organisation: 110 Sports Management Group
- Format: Non-ranking event
- Winner's share: £40,000
- Highest break: 140

Final
- Champion: (China) Tian Pengfei
- Runner-up: (Wales) Ryan Day
- Score: 9–3

The 2010 Beijing International Challenge (also known as the 2010 BTV Cup) was a professional non-ranking snooker tournament that took place between 19 and 25 July 2010 at the Beijing University Students' Gymnasium in Beijing, China.

Tian Pengfei won the title by defeating Ryan Day 9–3 in the final.

== Prize fund ==
The breakdown of prize money for this year is shown below:

- Winner: £40,000
- Runner-up: £19,500
- Semi-final: £7,500
- Highest break: £2,500
- Maximum break: Hyundai Sedan

== Main draw ==
=== Round-robin stage ===
==== Group A ====
Table

POS	Player	MP	MW	FW	FL	FD	PTS
1	(Wales) Ryan Day	4	3	18	15	+3	3
2	(China) Liang Wenbo	4	2	18	15	+3	2
3	(England) Ali Carter	4	2	17	17	0	2
4	(China) Xiao Guodong	4	2	14	17	−3	2
5	(Northern Ireland) Mark Allen	4	1	15	18	−3	1

Results:

- Ali Carter 5–4 Liang Wenbo
- Mark Allen 3–5 Xiao Guodong
- Ryan Day 3–5 Ali Carter
- Liang Wenbo 5–2 Xiao Guodong
- Mark Allen 5–3 Ali Carter
- Liang Wenbo 4–5 Ryan Day
- Mark Allen 4–5 Ryan Day
- Ali Carter 4–5 Xiao Guodong
- Liang Wenbo 5–3 Mark Allen
- Ryan Day 5–2 Xiao Guodong

==== Group B ====
Table

POS	Player	MP	MW	FW	FL	FD	PTS
1	(China) Tian Pengfei	4	3	16	14	+2	3
2	(Scotland) Stephen Maguire	4	2	17	13	+4	2
3	(China) Jin Long	4	2	15	13	+2	2
4	(Hong Kong) Marco Fu	4	2	16	18	−2	2
5	(Scotland) Stephen Hendry	4	1	13	19	−5	1

Results:

- Stephen Hendry 2–5 Tian Pengfei
- Stephen Maguire 5–1 Jin Long
- Marco Fu 5–4 Stephen Hendry
- Stephen Maguire 3–5 Tian Pengfei
- Marco Fu 4–5 Tian Pengfei
- Stephen Hendry 2–5 Jin Long
- Marco Fu 5–4 Jin Long
- Stephen Maguire 4–5 Stephen Hendry
- Tian Pengfei 1–5 Jin Long
- Stephen Maguire 5–2 Marco Fu

=== Knock-out stage ===
Semi-finals; Best of 11 frames
(Scotland) Stephen Maguire	3
(Wales) Ryan Day	6
(China) Liang Wenbo	4
(China) Tian Pengfei	6

Final; Best of 17 frames
(Wales) Ryan Day	3
(China) Tian Pengfei	9

== Qualifying ==
The qualifying tournament for the Beijing International Challenge (also known as the 2010 Chinese Classic) took place between 16 and 18 July 2010 at the Beijing University Students' Gymnasium, in Beijing, China.

=== Round-robin stage ===
==== Group A ====
Table

POS	Player	MP	MW	FW	FL	FD	PTS
1	(China) Zhang Anda	2	2	8	3	+5	2
2	(China) Tian Pengfei	2	1	6	6	0	1
3	(China) Li Hang	2	0	3	8	−5	0

Results:

- Li Hang 1–4 Zhang Anda
- Tian Pengfei 4–2 Li Hang
- Tian Pengfei 2–4 Zhang Anda

==== Group B ====
Table

POS	Player	MP	MW	FW	FL	FD	PTS
1	(China) Jin Long	2	1	6	5	+1	1
2	(China) Li Yan	2	1	5	5	0	1
3	(China) Xiao Guodong	2	1	5	6	−1	1

Results:

- Li Yan 1–4 Jin Long
- Jin Long 2–4 Xiao Guodong
- Xiao Guodong 1–4 Li Yan

=== Knock-out stage ===
Semi-finals; Best of 7 frames
(China) Tian Pengfei	4
(China) Jin Long	3
(China) Li Yan	3
(China) Zhang Anda	4

Final; Best of 9 frames
(China) Tian Pengfei	5
(China) Zhang Anda	3

== Century breaks ==
=== Main stage centuries ===
- 140, 110, 108, 105, 100 – Liang Wenbo
- 137, 107, 107, 103, 102 – Mark Allen
- 136, 136, 111 – Marco Fu
- 133, 100 – Tian Pengfei
- 120, 116, 116, 105 – Stephen Maguire
- 114, 106, 102 – Ryan Day
- 114 – Ali Carter
- 107, 100 – Jin Long
- 100 – Stephen Hendry

=== Qualifying stage centuries ===
- 119 – Xiao Guodong
- 114, 107 – Jin Long
- 113 – Li Yan
- 103 – Zhang Anda
