= 2014 China Open (snooker) =

China Open
Tournament information
- Dates: 31 March – 6 April 2014
- Venue: Beijing University Students' Gymnasium
- City: Beijing
- Country: China
- Organisation: World Snooker
- Format: Ranking event
- Total prize fund: £478,000
- Winner's share: £85,000
- Highest break: Zhao Xintong (CHN) (142)

Final
- Champion: Ding Junhui (CHN)
- Runner-up: Neil Robertson (AUS)
- Score: 10–5

The 2014 China Open was a professional ranking snooker tournament, that took place between 31 March and 6 April 2014 at the Beijing University Students' Gymnasium in Beijing, China. It was the eleventh ranking event of the 2013–14 season.

Ding Junhui won his 11th ranking title by defeating defending champion Neil Robertson 10–5 in the final, and became the sixth on the list of players with the most ranking titles behind Stephen Hendry (36 titles), Steve Davis (28), Ronnie O'Sullivan (26), John Higgins (25) and Mark Williams (18). Ding also equalled Hendry's record from 1990/1991 to win five ranking titles in a single season.

== Prize fund ==
The total prize money of the event was raised to £478,000 from the previous year's £425,000. The breakdown of prize money for this year is shown below:

- Winner: £85,000
- Runner-up: £35,000
- Semi-final: £21,000
- Quarter-final: £12,500
- Last 16: £8,000
- Last 32: £6,500
- Last 64: £3,000
- Non-televised highest break: £0
- Televised highest break: £2,000
- Total: £478,000

== Wildcard round ==
These matches were played in Beijing on 31 March 2014.

Match		Score	
WC1	Yu Delu (CHN)	5–2	Chen Zifan (CHN)
WC2	Luca Brecel (BEL)	5–2	Yuan Sijun (CHN)
WC3	John Astley (ENG)	5–2	Yan Bingtao (CHN)
WC4	Sam Baird (ENG)	2–5	Zhao Xintong (CHN)

== Main draw ==
Last 64; Best of 9 frames
(Australia) Neil Robertson	5
(England) Anthony Hamilton	4
(Scotland) Anthony McGill	3
(Wales) Mark Williams	5
(Thailand) James Wattana	5
(England) Mark Joyce	0
(China) Yu Delu	5
(Wales) Duane Jones	3
(Northern Ireland) Mark Allen	w/d
(Belgium) Luca Brecel	w/o
(England) Jack Lisowski	3
(Wales) Dominic Dale	5
(Scotland) Graeme Dott	5
(England) Rory McLeod	4
(England) Dave Harold	w/o
(Scotland) Stephen Maguire	w/d
(England) Shaun Murphy	5
(England) Jamie Cope	1
(Thailand) Dechawat Poomjaeng	5
(England) David Grace	3
(China) Xiao Guodong	5
(England) Hammad Miah	2
(India) Pankaj Advani	1
(England) Ricky Walden	5
(England) Ali Carter	5
(Wales) Jamie Jones	0
(England) Matthew Selt	5
(Wales) Ryan Day	2
(England) Peter Ebdon	5
(England) Jimmy Robertson	3
(Norway) Kurt Maflin	1
(England) Judd Trump	5
(China) Ding Junhui	5
(England) John Astley	1
(Republic of Ireland) Ken Doherty	0
(Thailand) Thepchaiya Un-Nooh	5
(Wales) Michael White	5
(China) Zhao Xintong	2
(England) Michael Wasley	2
(Scotland) John Higgins	5
(Hong Kong) Marco Fu	5
(China) Li Hang	3
(India) Aditya Mehta	4
(England) Mark King	5
(England) Kyren Wilson	3
(England) Jamie O'Neill	5
(Republic of Ireland) Fergal O'Brien	w/o
(England) Barry Hawkins	w/d
(England) Stuart Bingham	w/d
(England) Martin O'Donnell	w/o
(England) Craig Steadman	5
(England) Michael Holt	1
(England) Mike Dunn	5
(England) Peter Lines	4
(China) Tian Pengfei	5
(England) Gary Wilson	2
(Republic of Ireland) David Morris	2
(England) Jimmy White	5
(England) Alfie Burden	w/o
(Malta) Tony Drago	w/d
(England) Barry Pinches	2
(England) Nigel Bond	5
(England) Stuart Carrington	3
(England) Mark Selby	5

Last 32; Best of 9 frames
(Australia) Neil Robertson	5
(Wales) Mark Williams	4
(Thailand) James Wattana	1
(China) Yu Delu	5
(Belgium) Luca Brecel	5
(Wales) Dominic Dale	1
(Scotland) Graeme Dott	5
(England) Dave Harold	4
(England) Shaun Murphy	5
(Thailand) Dechawat Poomjaeng	0
(China) Xiao Guodong	3
(England) Ricky Walden	5
(England) Ali Carter	5
(England) Matthew Selt	2
(England) Peter Ebdon	5
(England) Judd Trump	4
(China) Ding Junhui	5
(Thailand) Thepchaiya Un-Nooh	3
(Wales) Michael White	1
(Scotland) John Higgins	5
(Hong Kong) Marco Fu	3
(England) Mark King	5
(England) Jamie O'Neill	5
(Republic of Ireland) Fergal O'Brien	2
(England) Martin O'Donnell	4
(England) Craig Steadman	5
(England) Mike Dunn	5
(China) Tian Pengfei	3
(England) Jimmy White	5
(England) Alfie Burden	3
(England) Nigel Bond	1
(England) Mark Selby	5

Last 16; Best of 9 frames
(Australia) Neil Robertson	5
(China) Yu Delu	4
(Belgium) Luca Brecel	2
(Scotland) Graeme Dott	5
(England) Shaun Murphy	3
(England) Ricky Walden	5
(England) Ali Carter	5
(England) Peter Ebdon	3
(China) Ding Junhui	5
(Scotland) John Higgins	2
(England) Mark King	5
(England) Jamie O'Neill	3
(England) Craig Steadman	3
(England) Mike Dunn	5
(England) Jimmy White	1
(England) Mark Selby	5

Quarter-finals; Best of 9 frames
(Australia) Neil Robertson	5
(Scotland) Graeme Dott	3
(England) Ricky Walden	3
(England) Ali Carter	5
(China) Ding Junhui	5
(England) Mark King	2
(England) Mike Dunn	5
(England) Mark Selby	3

Semi-finals; Best of 11 frames
(Australia) Neil Robertson	6
(England) Ali Carter	2
(China) Ding Junhui	6
(England) Mike Dunn	0

Final; Best of 19 frames
(Australia) Neil Robertson	5
(China) Ding Junhui	10

== Final ==
Final: Best of 19 frames. Referee: Terry Camilleri. Beijing University Students' Gymnasium, Beijing, China, 6 April 2014.
Neil Robertson; Australia	5–10	Ding Junhui; China
Afternoon: 0–98 (87), 0–63 (61), 58–67, 74–21, 0–123 (119), 6–110 (59), 20–71, 102–1 (102), 57–71; Evening: 63–13 (57), 5–125 (104), 64–49, 0–87 (67), 74–9 (57), 13–98 (66)
102	Highest break	119
1	Century breaks	2
3	50+ breaks	7

== Qualifying ==
These matches were held between 16 and 18 February 2014 at The Capital Venue in Gloucester, England. All matches were best of 9 frames.

(Australia) Neil Robertson	5–3	(China) Li Yan
(England) Anthony Hamilton	5–3	(Malta) Alex Borg
(Scotland) Anthony McGill	5–0	(Scotland) Michael Leslie
(Wales) Mark Williams	5–1	(Wales) Daniel Wells
(Wales) Matthew Stevens	0–5	(Thailand) James Wattana
(England) Mark Joyce	5–2	(England) Christopher Keogan
(China) Yu Delu	5–0	(China) Lyu Haotian
(England) Joe Perry	2–5	(Wales) Duane Jones
(Northern Ireland) Mark Allen	5–2	(England) James Cahill
(Scotland) Jamie Burnett	3–5	(Belgium) Luca Brecel
(England) Jack Lisowski	5–4	(England) Shane Castle
(Wales) Dominic Dale	5–1	(Qatar) Ahmed Saif
(Scotland) Graeme Dott	5–0	(England) Alex Davies
(England) Rory McLeod	5–4	(Thailand) Noppon Saengkham
(England) Dave Harold	5–4	(China) Zhang Anda
(Scotland) Stephen Maguire	5–2	(England) Chris Wakelin
(England) Shaun Murphy	5–4	(England) Adam Duffy
(England) Jamie Cope	5–0	(England) Gareth Green
(Thailand) Dechawat Poomjaeng	5–3	(Thailand) Ratchayothin Yotharuck
(China) Liang Wenbo	4–5	(England) David Grace
(China) Xiao Guodong	5–2	(Wales) Andrew Pagett
(Northern Ireland) Gerard Greene	4–5	(England) Hammad Miah
(India) Pankaj Advani	5–3	(China) Chen Zhe
(England) Ricky Walden	5–3	(England) Liam Highfield
(England) Ali Carter	5–1	(England) Lee Page
(Wales) Jamie Jones	5–1	(England) Mitchell Travis
(England) Matthew Selt	5–0	(Wales) Jak Jones
(Wales) Ryan Day	5–2	(Libya) Khaled Belaid Abumdas
(England) Peter Ebdon	5–4	(Scotland) Fraser Patrick
(England) Jimmy Robertson	5–3	(England) Sydney Wilson
(Norway) Kurt Maflin	5–0	(Scotland) Rhys Clark
(England) Judd Trump	5–0	(England) Elliot Slessor

(China) Ding Junhui	5–0	(Thailand) Thanawat Thirapongpaiboon
(England) Robbie Williams	2–5	(England) John Astley
(Republic of Ireland) Ken Doherty	5–1	(England) Andrew Norman
(England) Ben Woollaston	1–5	(Thailand) Thepchaiya Un-Nooh
(Wales) Michael White	5–0	(Scotland) Scott Donaldson
(China) Liu Chuang	2–5	(England) Sam Baird
(England) Steve Davis	3–5	(England) Michael Wasley
(Scotland) John Higgins	5–2	(Australia) Vinnie Calabrese
(Hong Kong) Marco Fu	5–1	(England) Adam Wicheard
(China) Cao Yupeng	4–5	(China) Li Hang
(India) Aditya Mehta	5–2	(Switzerland) Alexander Ursenbacher
(England) Mark King	5–1	(England) Chris Norbury
(Scotland) Marcus Campbell	4–5	(England) Kyren Wilson
(Scotland) Alan McManus	1–5	(England) Jamie O'Neill
(Republic of Ireland) Fergal O'Brien	5–1	(England) Paul Davison
(England) Barry Hawkins	5–2	(China) Cao Xinlong
(England) Stuart Bingham	5–2	(England) Allan Taylor
(England) David Gilbert	1–5	(England) Martin O'Donnell
(England) Ian Burns	3–5	(England) Craig Steadman
(England) Michael Holt	5–2	(England) Antony Parsons
(England) Tom Ford	4–5	(England) Mike Dunn
(England) Peter Lines	5–3	(England) Joel Walker
(China) Tian Pengfei	5–0	(England) Sean O'Sullivan
(England) Robert Milkins	3–5	(England) Gary Wilson
(England) Mark Davis	1–5	(Republic of Ireland) David Morris
(England) Jimmy White	5–2	(Northern Ireland) Joe Swail
(England) Alfie Burden	5–1	(Scotland) Ross Muir
(England) Andrew Higginson	3–5	(Malta) Tony Drago
(England) Martin Gould	3–5	(England) Barry Pinches
(England) Nigel Bond	5–1	(England) Sanderson Lam
(England) Rod Lawler	3–5	(England) Stuart Carrington
(England) Mark Selby	5–0	(England) Ryan Clark

== Century breaks ==
=== Qualifying stage centuries ===
- 141, 137 – Duane Jones
- 136 – Pankaj Advani
- 135 – Jimmy White
- 134 – John Higgins
- 127 – Michael Holt
- 126, 123 – Ryan Day
- 122, 109 – Alfie Burden
- 118 – David Morris
- 117 – Mike Dunn
- 116 – Shaun Murphy
- 115 – Anthony McGill
- 113 – Joel Walker
- 112 – Dominic Dale
- 112 – Mark Allen
- 107 – Mark Selby
- 107 – Ken Doherty
- 103 – Ricky Walden
- 100 – Rory McLeod
- 100 – David Grace

=== Televised stage centuries ===
- 142 – Xiao Guodong
- 136 – Li Hang
- 133 – Barry Pinches
- 130 – David Morris
- 129, 104 – Yu Delu
- 129 – Tian Pengfei
- 128 – Duane Jones
- 127 – Ryan Day
- 126, 119 – Peter Ebdon
- 124, 119, 104 – Ding Junhui
- 117 – Hammad Miah
- 115, 103 – John Higgins
- 110 – Jimmy White
- 109 – Michael White
- 106 – Ali Carter
- 102 – Neil Robertson
- 100 – Ricky Walden
