= 2014 German Masters =

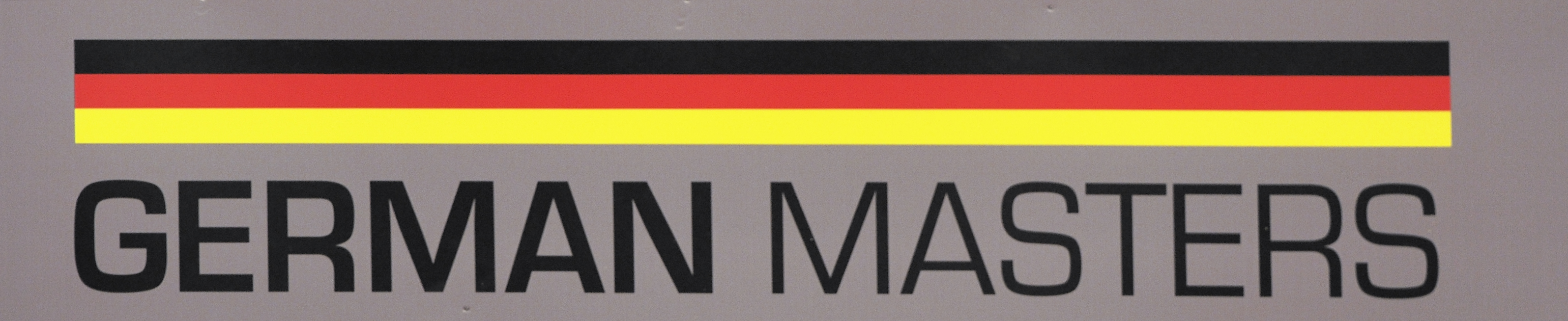

Tournament information
- Dates: 29 January – 2 February 2014
- Venue: Tempodrom
- City: Berlin
- Country: Germany
- Organisation: World Snooker
- Format: Ranking event
- Total prize fund: €337,976
- Winner's share: €80,000
- Highest break: Michael Holt (ENG) (143)

Final
- Champion: Ding Junhui (CHN)
- Runner-up: Judd Trump (ENG)
- Score: 9–5

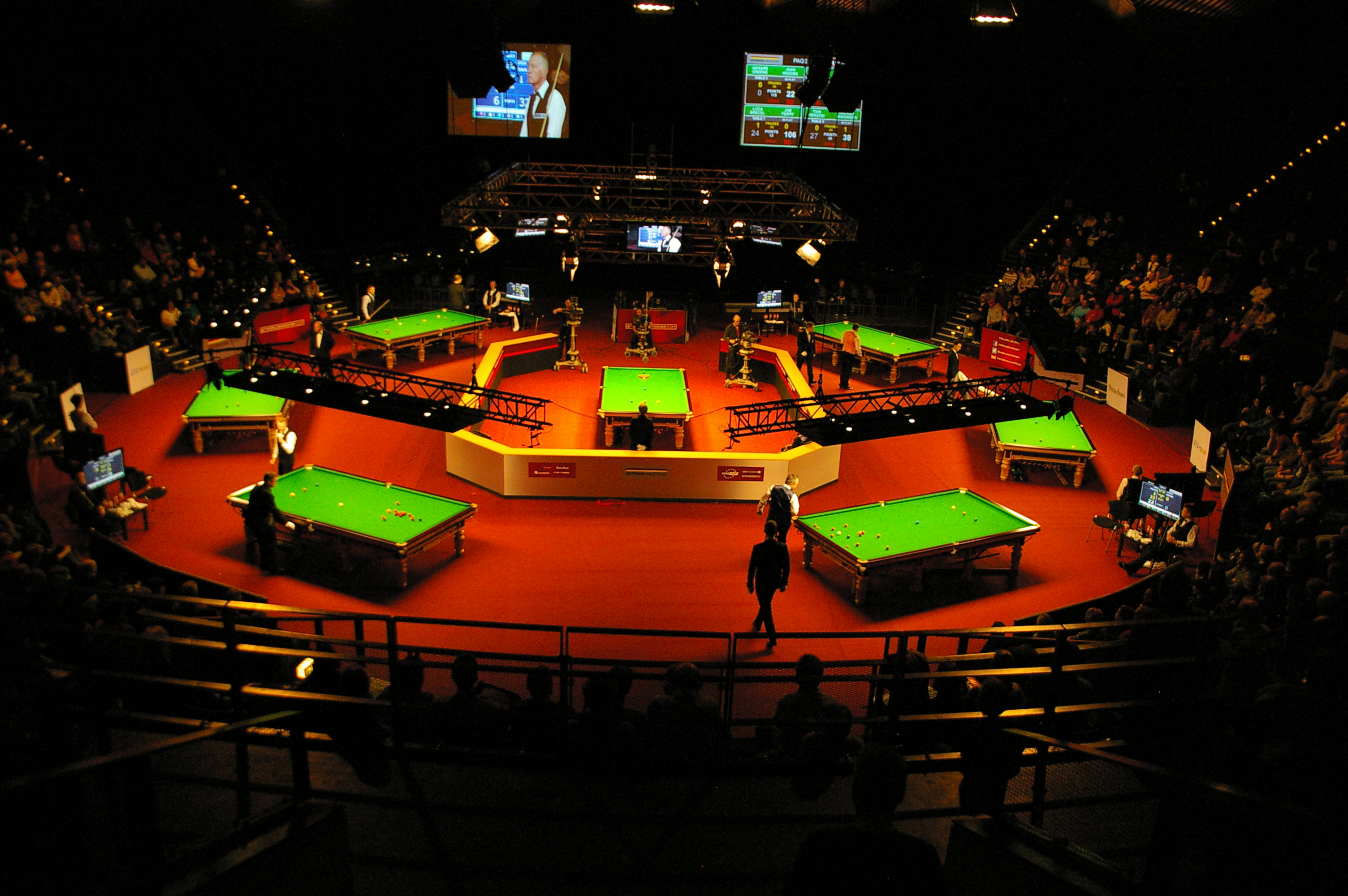
View into the main arena with seven tables during the third session of the first day

The 2014 German Masters was a professional ranking snooker tournament that took place between 29 January–2 February 2014 at the Tempodrom in Berlin, Germany. It was the seventh ranking event of the 2013/2014 season.

Two maximum breaks were compiled during the qualifying stage of the tournament at the Barnsley Metrodome in Barnsley, England. Dechawat Poomjaeng made the 101st official maximum break during his match against Zak Surety. This was Poomjaeng's first 147 break. Just one day later Gary Wilson made the 102nd official maximum break during the match against Ricky Walden. This was Wilson's first 147 break. It also took the total number of maximum breaks for the season to five.

Ali Carter was the defending champion, but he lost 4–5 against Dechawat Poomjaeng in the last 64.

Ding Junhui won his 10th ranking title by defeating Judd Trump 9–5 in the final. Ding became the first player to win four ranking events in a single season since Stephen Hendry in 1990/1991.

== Prize fund ==
The total prize money of the event was raised to €337,100 from the previous year's €300,000. The breakdown of prize money for this year is shown below:

- Winner: €80,000
- Runner-up: €35,000
- Semi-final: €20,000
- Quarter-final: €10,000
- Last 16: €5,000
- Last 32: €3,000
- Last 64: €1,500
- Non-televised highest break: €0
- Televised highest break: €4,000
- Non-televised maximum break: €2,976
- Total: €337,976

== Main draw ==
=== Top half ===
Last 64; Best of 9 frames
Ali Carter (ENG)	4
Dechawat Poomjaeng (THA)	5
Jimmy White (ENG)	1
Xiao Guodong (CHN)	5
Ratchayothin Yotharuck (THA)	2
Jamie Burnett (SCO)	5
Aditya Mehta (IND)	4
Joel Walker (ENG)	5
Stuart Bingham (ENG)	3
Peter Lines (ENG)	5
Anthony Hamilton (ENG)	5
Michael White (WAL)	2
Ryan Day (WAL)	w/o
Cao Xinlong (CHN)	w/d
Li Hang (CHN)	3
Barry Hawkins (ENG)	5
Ding Junhui (CHN)	5
Mike Dunn (ENG)	1
David Morris (IRL)	1
Mark Williams (WAL)	5
Dominic Dale (WAL)	5
Steve Davis (ENG)	2
Gerard Greene (NIR)	2
John Higgins (SCO)	5
Mark Allen (NIR)	3
Anthony McGill (SCO)	5
Luca Brecel (BEL)	2
Joe Perry (ENG)	5
Tom Ford (ENG)	2
Kurt Maflin (NOR)	5
Jimmy Robertson (ENG)	1
Mark Selby (ENG)	5

Last 32; Best of 9 frames
(Thailand) Dechawat Poomjaeng	4
(China) Xiao Guodong	5
(Scotland) Jamie Burnett	5
(England) Joel Walker	2
(England) Peter Lines	1
(England) Anthony Hamilton	5
(Wales) Ryan Day	5
(England) Barry Hawkins	4
(China) Ding Junhui	5
(Wales) Mark Williams	1
(Wales) Dominic Dale	5
(Scotland) John Higgins	3
(Scotland) Anthony McGill	0
(England) Joe Perry	5
(Norway) Kurt Maflin	5
(England) Mark Selby	3

Last 16; Best of 9 frames
(China) Xiao Guodong	5
(Scotland) Jamie Burnett	1
(England) Anthony Hamilton	3
(Wales) Ryan Day	5
(China) Ding Junhui	5
(Wales) Dominic Dale	3
(England) Joe Perry	5
(Norway) Kurt Maflin	1

Quarter-finals; Best of 9 frames
(China) Xiao Guodong	2
(Wales) Ryan Day	5
(China) Ding Junhui	5
(England) Joe Perry	2

Semi-finals; Best of 11 frames
(Wales) Ryan Day	5
(China) Ding Junhui	6

=== Bottom half ===
Last 64; Best of 9 frames
Neil Robertson (AUS)	5
Liu Chuang (CHN)	1
Tian Pengfei (CHN)	5
Andrew Higginson (ENG)	3
Marcus Campbell (SCO)	1
Rod Lawler (ENG)	5
Paul Davison (ENG)	5
Marco Fu (HKG)	2
Mark Davis (ENG)	5
David Gilbert (ENG)	3
Ben Woollaston (ENG)	1
Graeme Dott (SCO)	5
Liang Wenbo (CHN)	5
Cao Yupeng (CHN)	3
Mark Joyce (ENG)	1
Stephen Maguire (SCO)	5
Judd Trump (ENG)	5
Noppon Saengkham (THA)	1
Dave Harold (ENG)	4
Mark King (ENG)	5
Matthew Stevens (WAL)	5
Fergal O'Brien (IRL)	1
Ken Doherty (IRL)	1
Shaun Murphy (ENG)	5
Gary Wilson (ENG)	5
Daniel Wells (WAL)	1
Jamie O'Neill (ENG)	0
Michael Holt (ENG)	5
Peter Ebdon (ENG)	2
Alan McManus (SCO)	5
Jack Lisowski (ENG)	5
Thepchaiya Un-Nooh (THA)	0

Last 32; Best of 9 frames
(Australia) Neil Robertson	1
(China) Tian Pengfei	5
(England) Rod Lawler	5
(England) Paul Davison	4
(England) Mark Davis	5
(Scotland) Graeme Dott	1
(China) Liang Wenbo	5
(Scotland) Stephen Maguire	3
(England) Judd Trump	5
(England) Mark King	0
(Wales) Matthew Stevens	4
(England) Shaun Murphy	5
(England) Gary Wilson	2
(England) Michael Holt	5
(Scotland) Alan McManus	5
(England) Jack Lisowski	2

Last 16; Best of 9 frames
(China) Tian Pengfei	4
(England) Rod Lawler	5
(England) Mark Davis	5
(China) Liang Wenbo	2
(England) Judd Trump	5
(England) Shaun Murphy	2
(England) Michael Holt	5
(Scotland) Alan McManus	2

Quarter-finals; Best of 9 frames
(England) Rod Lawler	5
(England) Mark Davis	4
(England) Judd Trump	5
(England) Michael Holt	0

Semi-finals; Best of 11 frames
(England) Rod Lawler	1
(England) Judd Trump	6

== Final ==
Final: Best of 17 frames. Referee: Jan Verhaas. Tempodrom, Berlin, Germany, 2 February 2014.
Ding Junhui; China	9–5	Judd Trump; England
Afternoon: 0–80 (80), 87–0 (87), 14–65, 31–69, 92–0 (76), 48–76, 71–42 (51), 81–0 (81); Evening: 125–0 (125), 101–0 (101), 83–0 (72), 62–48, 31–83, 67–46
125	Highest break	80
2	Century breaks	0
7	50+ breaks	1

== Qualifying ==
These matches were played on 11 and 12 December 2013 at the Barnsley Metrodome in Barnsley, England. All matches were best of 9 frames.

Ali Carter (ENG)	5–3	Elliot Slessor (ENG)
Dechawat Poomjaeng (THA)	5–3	Zak Surety (ENG)
Jimmy White (ENG)	5–4	Vinnie Calabrese (AUS)
Xiao Guodong (CHN)	5–4	Robin Hull (FIN)
Martin Gould (ENG)	4–5	Ratchayothin Yotharuck (THA)
Jamie Burnett (SCO)	5–3	Ryan Clark (ENG)
Aditya Mehta (IND)	5–0	Li Yan (CHN)
Robert Milkins (ENG)	0–5	Joel Walker (ENG)
Stuart Bingham (ENG)	5–1	Hammad Miah (ENG)
Peter Lines (ENG)	5–4	Martin O'Donnell (ENG)
Anthony Hamilton (ENG)	5–3	Ross Muir (SCO)
Michael White (WAL)	5–3	James Cahill (ENG)
Ryan Day (WAL)	5–0	Tony Drago (MLT)
Alfie Burden (ENG)	4–5	Cao Xinlong (CHN)
Matthew Selt (ENG)	2–5	Li Hang (CHN)
Barry Hawkins (ENG)	5–1	Chen Zhe (CHN)
Ding Junhui (CHN)	5–2	Kyren Wilson (ENG)
Mike Dunn (ENG)	5–0	Christopher Keogan (ENG)
Rory McLeod (ENG)	2–5	David Morris (IRL)
Mark Williams (WAL)	5–1	Fraser Patrick (SCO)
Dominic Dale (WAL)	5–4	Thanawat Thirapongpaiboon (THA)
Steve Davis (ENG)	5–0	Dylan Mitchell (ENG)
Gerard Greene (NIR)	5–3	Shane Castle (ENG)
John Higgins (SCO)	5–3	Joe Swail (NIR)
Mark Allen (NIR)	5–3	Craig Steadman (ENG)
Anthony McGill (SCO)	5–0	Chris Norbury (ENG)
James Wattana (THA)	3–5	Luca Brecel (BEL)
Joe Perry (ENG)	5–0	Scott Donaldson (SCO)
Tom Ford (ENG)	5–1	Adam Wicheard (ENG)
Kurt Maflin (NOR)	5–1	Robbie Williams (ENG)
Jimmy Robertson (ENG)	5–0	Andrew Norman (ENG)
Mark Selby (ENG)	5–1	Pankaj Advani (IND)

Neil Robertson (AUS)	5–2	Ian Burns (ENG)
Liu Chuang (CHN)	5–1	Anthony Parsons (ENG)
Tian Pengfei (CHN)	5–4	Michael Wasley (ENG)
Andrew Higginson (ENG)	5–3	Sam Baird (ENG)
Marcus Campbell (SCO)	5–1	John Astley (ENG)
Rod Lawler (ENG)	5–1	Mitchell Travis (ENG)
Jamie Jones (WAL)	3–5	Paul Davison (ENG)
Marco Fu (HKG)	5–2	Adam Duffy (ENG)
Mark Davis (ENG)	5–0	Barry Pinches (ENG)
David Gilbert (ENG)	5–2	Zhang Anda (CHN)
Ben Woollaston (ENG)	5–3	Liam Highfield (ENG)
Graeme Dott (SCO)	5–0	Andrew Pagett (WAL)
Liang Wenbo (CHN)	5–4	Allan Taylor (ENG)
Cao Yupeng (CHN)	5–3	Chris Wakelin (ENG)
Mark Joyce (ENG)	5–2	Sydney Wilson (ENG)
Stephen Maguire (SCO)	5–1	Stuart Carrington (ENG)
Judd Trump (ENG)	5–3	Sanderson Lam (ENG)
Jamie Cope (ENG)	1–5	Noppon Saengkham (THA)
Dave Harold (ENG)	5–4	Alexander Ursenbacher (SUI)
Mark King (ENG)	5–3	Alex Borg (MLT)
Matthew Stevens (WAL)	5–2	Alex Davies (ENG)
Fergal O'Brien (IRL)	5–0	Lee Page (ENG)
Ken Doherty (IRL)	5–2	David Grace (ENG)
Shaun Murphy (ENG)	5–0	Michael Leslie (SCO)
Ricky Walden (ENG)	3–5	Gary Wilson (ENG)
Nigel Bond (ENG)	1–5	Daniel Wells (WAL)
Yu Delu (CHN)	3–5	Jamie O'Neill (ENG)
Michael Holt (ENG)	5–3	Lyu Haotian (CHN)
Peter Ebdon (ENG)	5–3	Duane Jones (WAL)
Alan McManus (SCO)	5–1	Jak Jones (WAL)
Jack Lisowski (ENG)	5–0	Khaled Belaid Abumdas (LBY)
Ronnie O'Sullivan (ENG)	4–5	Thepchaiya Un-Nooh (THA)

== Century breaks ==
=== Qualifying stage centuries ===
- 147, 135 – Gary Wilson
- 147 – Dechawat Poomjaeng
- 141 – Alan McManus
- 122 – Xiao Guodong
- 120 – Dominic Dale
- 118 – Matthew Stevens
- 115 – Noppon Saengkham
- 115 – Mark Selby
- 113 – Peter Ebdon
- 111 – Michael Holt
- 111 – Neil Robertson
- 110 – Judd Trump
- 109 – Joe Perry
- 107 – Barry Hawkins
- 107 – Mark King
- 106 – Anthony McGill
- 105 – Dave Harold
- 103 – Robin Hull
- 102 – Ross Muir
- 101 – Sam Baird
- 100 – Michael White
- 100 – Marco Fu

=== Televised stage centuries ===
- 143, 106 – Michael Holt
- 138, 130, 114 – Xiao Guodong
- 128 – Shaun Murphy
- 127, 122, 117, 110, 102 – Judd Trump
- 125, 121, 107, 101 – Ding Junhui
- 124, 108 – Tian Pengfei
- 124 – Neil Robertson
- 123 – Gary Wilson
- 118 – Mark King
- 113, 105 – Mark Selby
- 112 – Anthony McGill
- 109 – Ryan Day
- 104, 102 – Joe Perry
- 104 – Joel Walker
- 102 – Kurt Maflin
- 100 – Mark Williams
- 100 – Stephen Maguire
