= 2014 World Open (snooker) =

Gujinggong Liquor Haikou World Open

Tournament information
- Dates: 10–16 March 2014
- Venue: Hainan International Exhibition Center
- City: Haikou
- Country: China
- Organisation: World Snooker
- Format: Ranking event
- Total prize fund: £478,000
- Winner's share: £85,000
- Highest break: Anthony McGill (SCO) (144)

Final
- Champion: Shaun Murphy (ENG)
- Runner-up: Mark Selby (ENG)
- Score: 10–6

The 2014 Gujinggong Liquor Haikou World Open was a professional ranking snooker tournament that took place between 10 and 16 March 2014 at the Hainan International Exhibition Center in Haikou, China. It was the ninth ranking event of the 2013/2014 season.

Mark Allen was the defending champion, but he lost 4–6 against Shaun Murphy in the semi-final.

Murphy won his fifth ranking title by defeating Mark Selby 10–6 in the final.

== Prize fund ==
The total prize money of the event was raised to £478,000 from the previous year's £425,000. The breakdown of prize money for this year is shown below:

- Winner: £85,000
- Runner-up: £35,000
- Semi-final: £21,000
- Quarter-final: £12,500
- Last 16: £8,000
- Last 32: £6,500
- Last 64: £3,000
- Non-televised highest break: £0
- Televised highest break: £2,000
- Total: £478,000

== Wildcard round ==
These matches were played in Haikou on 10 March 2014.

Match		Score	
WC1	Jamie Burnett (SCO)	w/d–w/o	Yuan Sijun (CHN)
WC2	Sanderson Lam (ENG)	3–5	Chen Zifan (CHN)
WC3	Scott Donaldson (SCO)	5–1	Lin Shuai (CHN)
WC4	Rory McLeod (ENG)	5–1	Zhao Xintong (CHN)

== Main draw ==
Last 64; Best of 9 frames
(Northern Ireland) Mark Allen	5
(England) Mike Dunn	2
(China) Yuan Sijun	1
(Wales) Mark Williams	5
(Republic of Ireland) Ken Doherty	5
(England) Barry Pinches	2
(England) Alfie Burden	4
(England) Ricky Walden	5
(Scotland) John Higgins	5
(England) Alex Davies	1
(India) Aditya Mehta	3
(Wales) Michael White	5
(Wales) Matthew Stevens	5
(China) Yu Delu	0
(China) Chen Zifan	0
(England) Judd Trump	5
(Scotland) Stephen Maguire	4
(Thailand) Thepchaiya Un-Nooh	5
(England) Craig Steadman	2
(England) Andrew Higginson	5
(Wales) Ryan Day	5
(England) Michael Wasley	4
(China) Tian Pengfei	2
(Scotland) Graeme Dott	5
(England) Shaun Murphy	5
(England) Jimmy White	1
(China) Cao Yupeng	2
(England) Mark King	5
(China) Xiao Guodong	4
(India) Pankaj Advani	5
(China) Li Yan	1
(China) Ding Junhui	5
(England) Mark Selby	5
(England) Anthony Hamilton	3
(Northern Ireland) Gerard Greene	2
(Thailand) Noppon Saengkham	5
(China) Liang Wenbo	5
(Scotland) Scott Donaldson	1
(England) Adam Wicheard	0
(England) Mark Davis	5
(England) Robert Milkins	5
(England) Rod Lawler	2
(Scotland) Alan McManus	5
(England) Martin Gould	1
(Wales) Dominic Dale	5
(Scotland) Michael Leslie	4
(England) Steve Davis	3
(England) Stuart Bingham	5
(England) Barry Hawkins	5
(England) Matthew Selt	4
(England) Mark Joyce	5
(Republic of Ireland) David Morris	2
(England) Ali Carter	5
(England) David Gilbert	3
(Norway) Kurt Maflin	5
(England) Joe Perry	1
(Hong Kong) Marco Fu	5
(Scotland) Anthony McGill	3
(England) Nigel Bond	1
(England) Michael Holt	5
(England) Tom Ford	4
(England) Rory McLeod	5
(Wales) Jamie Jones	1
(Australia) Neil Robertson	5

Last 32; Best of 9 frames
(Northern Ireland) Mark Allen	5
(Wales) Mark Williams	3
(Republic of Ireland) Ken Doherty	1
(England) Ricky Walden	5
(Scotland) John Higgins	5
(Wales) Michael White	0
(Wales) Matthew Stevens	4
(England) Judd Trump	5
(Thailand) Thepchaiya Un-Nooh	5
(England) Andrew Higginson	1
(Wales) Ryan Day	2
(Scotland) Graeme Dott	5
(England) Shaun Murphy	5
(England) Mark King	1
(India) Pankaj Advani	4
(China) Ding Junhui	5
(England) Mark Selby	5
(Thailand) Noppon Saengkham	2
(China) Liang Wenbo	5
(England) Mark Davis	3
(England) Robert Milkins	3
(Scotland) Alan McManus	5
(Wales) Dominic Dale	5
(England) Stuart Bingham	4
(England) Barry Hawkins	4
(England) Mark Joyce	5
(England) Ali Carter	2
(Norway) Kurt Maflin	5
(Hong Kong) Marco Fu	5
(England) Michael Holt	3
(England) Rory McLeod	1
(Australia) Neil Robertson	5

Last 16; Best of 9 frames
(Northern Ireland) Mark Allen	5
(England) Ricky Walden	2
(Scotland) John Higgins	5
(England) Judd Trump	4
(Thailand) Thepchaiya Un-Nooh	2
(Scotland) Graeme Dott	5
(England) Shaun Murphy	5
(China) Ding Junhui	4
(England) Mark Selby	5
(China) Liang Wenbo	1
(Scotland) Alan McManus	5
(Wales) Dominic Dale	1
(England) Mark Joyce	5
(Norway) Kurt Maflin	3
(Hong Kong) Marco Fu	5
(Australia) Neil Robertson	4

Quarter-finals; Best of 9 frames
(Northern Ireland) Mark Allen	5
(Scotland) John Higgins	3
(Scotland) Graeme Dott	4
(England) Shaun Murphy	5
(England) Mark Selby	5
(Scotland) Alan McManus	1
(England) Mark Joyce	3
(Hong Kong) Marco Fu	5

Semi-finals; Best of 11 frames
(Northern Ireland) Mark Allen	4
(England) Shaun Murphy	6
(England) Mark Selby	6
(Hong Kong) Marco Fu	4

Final; Best of 19 frames
(England) Shaun Murphy	10
(England) Mark Selby	6

== Final ==
Final: Best of 19 frames. Referee: Colin Humphries. Hainan International Exhibition Center, Haikou, China, 16 March 2014.
Shaun Murphy; England	10–6	Mark Selby; England
Afternoon: 95–1 (64), 80–46 (80), 81–40, 75–26 (52), 5–83, 13–91 (91), 102–1 (98), 113–1 (105), 112–0 (112); Evening: 8–92 (78), 53–62, 18–78, 85–4 (60), 43–82, 78–49 (78), 77–54
112	Highest break	91
2	Century breaks	0
8	50+ breaks	2

== Qualifying ==
These matches were played on 13 and 14 December 2013 at the Barnsley Metrodome in Barnsley, England. All matches were best of 9 frames.

(Northern Ireland) Mark Allen	5–4	(England) Chris Wakelin
(England) Mike Dunn	5–1	(England) Paul Davison
(Scotland) Jamie Burnett	5–2	(England) Ryan Clark
(Wales) Mark Williams	5–3	(England) Chris Norbury
(Republic of Ireland) Ken Doherty	5–4	(England) Allan Taylor
(Thailand) Dechawat Poomjaeng	2–5	(England) Barry Pinches
(England) Alfie Burden	5–0	(Scotland) Ross Muir
(England) Ricky Walden	5–1	(England) John Astley
(Scotland) John Higgins	5–3	(England) Sydney Wilson
(England) Jimmy Robertson	4–5	(England) Alex Davies
(India) Aditya Mehta	5–2	(Wales) Jak Jones
(Wales) Michael White	5–2	(England) Shane Castle
(Wales) Matthew Stevens	5–0	(Libya) Khaled Belaid Abumdas
(China) Yu Delu	5–1	(Republic of Ireland) Josh Boileau
(England) Dave Harold	1–5	(England) Sanderson Lam
(England) Judd Trump	5–3	(Thailand) Ratchayothin Yotharuck
(Scotland) Stephen Maguire	5–2	(Scotland) Rhys Clark
(England) Peter Lines	3–5	(Thailand) Thepchaiya Un-Nooh
(Republic of Ireland) Fergal O'Brien	3–5	(England) Craig Steadman
(England) Andrew Higginson	5–0	(England) Ashley Carty
(Wales) Ryan Day	5–4	(Belgium) Luca Brecel
(England) Jamie Cope	3–5	(England) Michael Wasley
(China) Tian Pengfei	5–1	(England) Ian Burns
(Scotland) Graeme Dott	5–4	(England) James Cahill
(England) Shaun Murphy	5–1	(Malta) Tony Drago
(England) Jimmy White	5–1	(England) Dylan Mitchell
(China) Cao Yupeng	5–3	(Wales) Daniel Wells
(England) Mark King	5–4	(England) David Grace
(China) Xiao Guodong	5–1	(Wales) Andrew Pagett
(India) Pankaj Advani	5–2	(England) Mitchell Travis
(England) Ben Woollaston	1–5	(China) Li Yan
(China) Ding Junhui	5–0	(England) Christopher Keogan

(England) Mark Selby	5–2	(China) Lyu Haotian
(England) Anthony Hamilton	5–3	(England) Andrew Norman
(Northern Ireland) Gerard Greene	5–0	(China) Zhang Anda
(Scotland) Marcus Campbell	2–5	(Thailand) Noppon Saengkham
(China) Liang Wenbo	5–2	(China) Chen Zhe
(England) Jack Lisowski	3–5	(Scotland) Scott Donaldson
(China) Liu Chuang	2–5	(England) Adam Wicheard
(England) Mark Davis	5–4	(Thailand) Thanawat Thirapongpaiboon
(England) Robert Milkins	5–3	(Northern Ireland) Joe Swail
(England) Rod Lawler	5–1	(England) Elliot Slessor
(Scotland) Alan McManus	5–2	(England) Jeff Cundy
(England) Martin Gould	5–2	(England) Sam Baird
(Wales) Dominic Dale	5–0	(China) Cao Xinlong
(Thailand) James Wattana	2–5	(Scotland) Michael Leslie
(England) Steve Davis	5–2	(England) Hammad Miah
(England) Stuart Bingham	5–1	(England) Robbie Williams
(England) Barry Hawkins	5–4	(Australia) Vinnie Calabrese
(England) Matthew Selt	5–3	(England) Liam Highfield
(England) Mark Joyce	5–2	(Scotland) Fraser Patrick
(England) Peter Ebdon	2–5	(Republic of Ireland) David Morris
(England) Ali Carter	5–3	(England) Stuart Carrington
(England) David Gilbert	5–4	(England) Gary Wilson
(Norway) Kurt Maflin	5–1	(Finland) Robin Hull
(England) Joe Perry	5–4	(China) Li Hang
(Hong Kong) Marco Fu	5–0	(England) Martin O'Donnell
(Scotland) Anthony McGill	5–2	(England) Adam Duffy
(England) Nigel Bond	5–0	(England) Lee Page
(England) Michael Holt	5–2	(Malta) Alex Borg
(England) Tom Ford	5–4	(England) Joel Walker
(England) Rory McLeod	5–1	(England) Kyren Wilson
(Wales) Jamie Jones	5–4	(England) Jamie O'Neill
(Australia) Neil Robertson	5–0	(Switzerland) Alexander Ursenbacher

== Century breaks ==
=== Qualifying stage centuries ===
- 141 – Tom Ford
- 137 – Marco Fu
- 135 – Ding Junhui
- 131 – Tian Pengfei
- 125 – Stuart Bingham
- 119 – Luca Brecel
- 117 – Ryan Day
- 116 – Liam Highfield
- 115 – David Gilbert
- 112 – Joel Walker
- 107, 104 – Xiao Guodong
- 107 – Jamie Cope
- 106 – Dechawat Poomjaeng
- 105, 105 – Matthew Stevens
- 105 – Kurt Maflin
- 105 – Neil Robertson
- 104 – Graeme Dott
- 102 – David Morris

=== Televised stage centuries ===
- 144 – Anthony McGill
- 136, 128 – Ding Junhui
- 135, 131, 123 – Mark Selby
- 134, 127 – Thepchaiya Un-Nooh
- 129, 110 – Kurt Maflin
- 128, 126, 112, 105 – Shaun Murphy
- 127, 121, 114, 104, 104, 104 – Marco Fu
- 127, 119, 111, 100 – Mark Allen
- 127, 116, 111, 100 – Neil Robertson
- 124, 122, 104 – John Higgins
- 117, 104 – Michael Holt
- 113 – Tian Pengfei
- 112 – Martin Gould
- 112 – Ricky Walden
- 111 – Stephen Maguire
- 111 – Liang Wenbo
- 110, 100 – Judd Trump
- 108 – Mark Joyce
- 103 – Stuart Bingham
- 101 – Alan McManus
