= 2010 China Open (snooker) =

Sanyuan Foods China Open

Tournament information
- Dates: 29 March – 4 April 2010
- Venue: Beijing University Students' Gymnasium
- City: Beijing
- Country: China
- Organisation: WPBSA
- Format: Ranking event
- Total prize fund: £300,000
- Winner's share: £55,000
- Highest break: Neil Robertson (AUS) (147)

Final
- Champion: Mark Williams (WAL)
- Runner-up: Ding Junhui (CHN)
- Score: 10–6

The 2010 Sanyuan Foods China Open was a professional ranking snooker tournament that took place between 29 March and 4 April 2010 at the Beijing University Students' Gymnasium in Beijing, China. This was the first time that the China Open was sponsored by Sanyuan Foods.

Peter Ebdon was the defending champion, but he lost 2–5 to Ding Junhui in the quarter-finals.

Mark Williams won in the final, 10–6, against Ding Junhui.

== Prize fund ==
The breakdown of prize money for this year is shown below:

- Winner: £55,000
- Runner-up: £28,000
- Semi-final: £14,000
- Quarter-final: £7,525
- Last 16: £5,370
- Last 32: £3,640
- Last 48: £2,050
- Last 64: £1,400
- Stage one highest break: £500
- Stage two highest break: £2,000
- Stage one maximum break: £1,000
- Stage two maximum break: £20,000
- Total: £300,000

== Wildcard round ==
These matches were played in Beijing on 29 March 2010.

Match		Score	
WC1	Rod Lawler (ENG)	5–3	Supoj Saenla (THA)
WC2	Robert Milkins (ENG)	5–2	Lu Chenwei (CHN)
WC3	Andrew Higginson (ENG)	5–0	Li Yan (CHN)
WC4	Mark Davis (ENG)	4–5	Tian Pengfei (CHN)
WC5	James Wattana (THA)	5–0	Au Chi-wai (HKG)
WC6	Tony Drago (MLT)	5–3	Shi Shuamgyang (CHN)
WC7	Rory McLeod (ENG)	0–5	Liu Chuang (CHN)
WC8	Bjorn Haneveer (BEL)	5–4	Yu Delu (CHN)

== Main draw ==
Last 32; Best of 9 frames
1	(England) Peter Ebdon	5
(England) Judd Trump	4
10	(Australia) Neil Robertson	5
(England) Mike Dunn	2
14	(China) Ding Junhui	5
(Northern Ireland) Gerard Greene	3
8	(England) Mark Selby	5
(England) Rod Lawler	2
7	(Wales) Ryan Day	5
(England) Robert Milkins	1
11	(Scotland) Stephen Hendry	5
(England) Andrew Higginson	2
12	(Northern Ireland) Mark Allen	5
(Scotland) Graeme Dott	1
4	(Scotland) Stephen Maguire	5
(England) Barry Hawkins	3
3	(England) Ronnie O'Sullivan	3
(China) Tian Pengfei	5
16	(England) Mark King	5
(Thailand) James Wattana	4
13	(England) Joe Perry	5
(Malta) Tony Drago	1
6	(England) Ali Carter	5
(China) Liu Chuang	1
5	(England) Shaun Murphy	2
(England) Nigel Bond	5
9	(Hong Kong) Marco Fu	5
(Belgium) Bjorn Haneveer	2
15	(Wales) Mark Williams	5
(England) Jamie Cope	3
2	(Scotland) John Higgins	5
(Republic of Ireland) Fergal O'Brien	3

Last 16; Best of 9 frames
1	(England) Peter Ebdon	5
10	(Australia) Neil Robertson	1
14	(China) Ding Junhui	5
8	(England) Mark Selby	3
7	(Wales) Ryan Day	0
11	(Scotland) Stephen Hendry	5
12	(Northern Ireland) Mark Allen	5
4	(Scotland) Stephen Maguire	3
(China) Tian Pengfei	3
16	(England) Mark King	5
13	(England) Joe Perry	3
6	(England) Ali Carter	5
(England) Nigel Bond	3
9	(Hong Kong) Marco Fu	5
15	(Wales) Mark Williams	5
2	(Scotland) John Higgins	2

Quarter-finals; Best of 9 frames
1	(England) Peter Ebdon	2
14	(China) Ding Junhui	5
11	(Scotland) Stephen Hendry	4
12	(Northern Ireland) Mark Allen	5
16	(England) Mark King	1
6	(England) Ali Carter	5
9	(Hong Kong) Marco Fu	1
15	(Wales) Mark Williams	5

Semi-finals; Best of 11 frames
14	(China) Ding Junhui	6
12	(Northern Ireland) Mark Allen	2
6	(England) Ali Carter	4
15	(Wales) Mark Williams	6

Final; Best of 19 frames
14	(China) Ding Junhui	6
15	(Wales) Mark Williams	10

== Final ==
Final: Best of 19 frames. Referee: Michaela Tabb. Beijing University Students' Gymnasium, Beijing, China, 4 April 2010.
Ding Junhui (14); China	6–10	Mark Williams (15); Wales
Afternoon: 12–111 (110), 128–0 (127), 83–1 (53), 74–25 (70), 29–69 (68), 123–7 (116), 35–87 (55), 86–32 (82), 17–109 (61); Evening: 4–81 (81), 61–66 (65), 73–0 (73), 0–76 (64), 11–84, 57–85 (59), 14–75
127	Highest break	110
2	Century breaks	1
6	50+ breaks	8

== Qualifying ==
These matches took place between 2 and 5 February 2010 at the Pontin's Centre, Prestatyn, Wales.

Round 1 Best of 9 frames
(Thailand) Atthasit Mahitthi	4
(Wales) Michael White	5
(England) Chris Norbury	5
(China) Zhang Anda	4
(England) Ben Woollaston	5
(England) Andrew Norman	0
(England) Matthew Selt	5
(Scotland) Mark Boyle	2
(Thailand) Noppadol Sangnil	4
(China) Mei Xiwen	5
(Wales) Daniel Wells	3
(England) Joe Jogia	5
(Northern Ireland) Patrick Wallace	5
(Republic of Ireland) Brendan O'Donoghue	2
(England) Lee Spick	3
(Wales) Ian Preece	5
(China) Xiao Guodong	5
(Northern Ireland) Jordan Brown	3
(England) Simon Bedford	1
(Thailand) James Wattana	5
(England) Lee Page	2
(Malta) Tony Drago	5
(England) Stephen Rowlings	4
(England) Jimmy Robertson	5
(China) Li Hang	0
(England) David Gray	5
(Belgium) Bjorn Haneveer	5
(Thailand) Thepchaiya Un-Nooh	4
(England) Matthew Couch	5
(Republic of Ireland) David Hogan	3
(England) Craig Steadman	3
(England) Sam Baird	5

Round 2 Best of 9 frames
(England) Tom Ford	5
(Wales) Michael White	0
(Republic of Ireland) David Morris	3
(England) Chris Norbury	5
(England) Andy Hicks	5
(England) Ben Woollaston	1
(England) Rod Lawler	5
(England) Matthew Selt	4
(England) Robert Milkins	5
(China) Mei Xiwen	1
(England) Peter Lines	4
(England) Joe Jogia	5
(England) David Gilbert	5
(Northern Ireland) Patrick Wallace	1
(England) Mark Joyce	5
(Wales) Ian Preece	4
(England) Jimmy White	4
(China) Xiao Guodong	5
(Republic of Ireland) Joe Delaney	0
(Thailand) James Wattana	5
(England) John Parrott	2
(Malta) Tony Drago	5
(China) Jin Long	2
(England) Jimmy Robertson	5
(England) Barry Pinches	5
(England) David Gray	1
(England) David Roe	4
(Belgium) Bjorn Haneveer	5
(Wales) Paul Davies	2
(England) Matthew Couch	5
(China) Liu Song	2
(England) Sam Baird	5

Round 3 Best of 9 frames
(England) Jimmy Michie	2
(England) Tom Ford	5
(England) Mike Dunn	5
(England) Chris Norbury	3
(Republic of Ireland) Michael Judge	5
(England) Andy Hicks	1
(Wales) Dominic Dale	3
(England) Rod Lawler	5
(Scotland) Marcus Campbell	0
(England) Robert Milkins	5
(England) Andrew Higginson	5
(England) Joe Jogia	0
(Republic of Ireland) Ken Doherty	5
(England) David Gilbert	0
(Scotland) Alan McManus	5
(England) Mark Joyce	1
(England) Mark Davis	5
(China) Xiao Guodong	3
(England) Martin Gould	2
(Thailand) James Wattana	5
(England) Anthony Hamilton	4
(Malta) Tony Drago	5
(England) Rory McLeod	5
(England) Jimmy Robertson	1
(England) Adrian Gunnell	5
(England) Barry Pinches	4
(England) Stuart Pettman	2
(Belgium) Bjorn Haneveer	5
(Scotland) Jamie Burnett	5
(England) Matthew Couch	1
(England) Ian McCulloch	1
(England) Sam Baird	5

Round 4 Best of 9 frames
(England) Judd Trump	5
(England) Tom Ford	1
(England) Steve Davis	3
(England) Mike Dunn	5
(Northern Ireland) Gerard Greene	5
(Republic of Ireland) Michael Judge	2
(England) Ricky Walden	2
(England) Rod Lawler	5
(England) Michael Holt	3
(England) Robert Milkins	5
(China) Liang Wenbo	2
(England) Andrew Higginson	5
(Scotland) Graeme Dott	5
(Republic of Ireland) Ken Doherty	2
(England) Barry Hawkins	5
(Scotland) Alan McManus	1
(England) Stuart Bingham	2
(England) Mark Davis	5
(Northern Ireland) Joe Swail	1
(Thailand) James Wattana	5
(England) Stephen Lee	2
(Malta) Tony Drago	5
(England) Dave Harold	1
(England) Rory McLeod	5
(England) Nigel Bond	5
(England) Adrian Gunnell	3
(Wales) Matthew Stevens	2
(Belgium) Bjorn Haneveer	5
(England) Jamie Cope	5
(Scotland) Jamie Burnett	3
(Republic of Ireland) Fergal O'Brien	5
(England) Sam Baird	2

== Century breaks ==
=== Qualifying stage centuries ===
- 134, 105 – Matthew Selt
- 134 – David Gray
- 132, 100 – Robert Milkins
- 132 – Jimmy Robertson
- 122 – Tony Drago
- 119 – Jamie Cope
- 117 – Matthew Stevens
- 114, 100 – Judd Trump
- 112, 102 – Barry Pinches
- 112, 101 – Tom Ford
- 111 – Dominic Dale
- 110, 108 – Jordan Brown
- 110 – Rory McLeod
- 109, 100, 100 – Sam Baird
- 100 – Craig Steadman

=== Televised stage centuries ===
- 147, 112, 102 – Neil Robertson
- 143 – Mark Davis
- 137, 127, 126, 125, 121, 116, 107, 101, 100 – Ding Junhui
- 132, 126 – Stephen Hendry
- 130 – Peter Ebdon
- 127 – Shaun Murphy
- 120 – Tony Drago
- 116, 110, 108 – Mark Williams
- 116, 101 – Mark Selby
- 116 – Yu Delu
- 110 – Marco Fu
- 104 – Liu Chuang
- 102 – Mark Allen
- 102 – Bjorn Haneveer
- 100 – Mark King
