= 2017 China Open (snooker) =

China Open
Tournament information
- Dates: 27 March – 2 April 2017
- Venue: Beijing University Students' Gymnasium
- City: Beijing
- Country: China
- Organisation: World Snooker
- Format: Ranking event
- Total prize fund: £510,000
- Winner's share: £85,000
- Highest break: Judd Trump (ENG) (147)

Final
- Champion: Mark Selby (ENG)
- Runner-up: Mark Williams (WAL)
- Score: 10–8

The 2017 China Open was a professional ranking snooker tournament, that took place between 27 March and 2 April 2017 at the Beijing University Students' Gymnasium in Beijing, China. It was the 18th and penultimate ranking event of the 2016–17 season. The tournament was broadcast in Europe on Eurosport and Eurosport Player.

Judd Trump was the defending champion, but he lost in the quarter-finals to Hossein Vafaei.

Mark Selby defeated Mark Williams 10–8 in the final to win his second China Open title and 11th career ranking title overall.

Trump made the 130th official maximum break and the third of his career in the fifth frame of his 5–3 win over Tian Pengfei in the third round.

== Prize fund ==
The breakdown of prize money for this year is shown below:

- Winner: £85,000
- Runner-up: £35,000
- Semi-final: £21,000
- Quarter-final: £12,500
- Last 16: £8,000
- Last 32: £6,500
- Last 64: £4,000
- Televised highest break: £2,000
- Total: £510,000

The "rolling 147 prize" for a maximum break: £30,000.

== Wildcard round ==
These matches were played in Beijing on 27 March 2017.

Match		Score	
WC1	Robbie Williams (ENG)	w/d–w/o	Fan Zhengyi (CHN)
WC2	Jimmy White (ENG)	5–1	Li Yuan (CHN)
WC3	Li Hang (CHN)	5–1	Luo Honghao (CHN)
WC4	Alex Borg (MLT)	4–5	Niu Zhuang (CHN)

== Main draw ==
Last 64; Best of 9 frames
(England) Judd Trump	5
(England) Ashley Hugill	1
(Scotland) Eden Sharav	5
(Scotland) Ross Muir	0
(Scotland) Anthony McGill	3
(China) Tian Pengfei	5
(England) Martin Gould	5
(China) Fan Zhengyi	1
(England) Mike Dunn	5
(England) Andy Hicks	3
(England) Rory McLeod	5
(China) Liang Wenbo	2
(Norway) Kurt Maflin	3
(England) Ben Woollaston	5
(Iran) Hossein Vafaei	5
(England) Joe Perry	2
(England) Shaun Murphy	5
(England) Allan Taylor	2
(Scotland) Graeme Dott	3
(England) Gary Wilson	5
(England) Ali Carter	5
(England) Stuart Carrington	0
(Wales) Michael White	5
(China) Yu Delu	3
(England) Jimmy White	3
(England) Michael Holt	5
(China) Zhang Anda	1
(Wales) Mark Williams	5
(Scotland) Rhys Clark	4
(England) Mark Davis	5
(England) Ian Burns	1
(Scotland) John Higgins	5
(England) Stuart Bingham	5
(Scotland) Scott Donaldson	3
(England) Robert Milkins	3
(Thailand) Noppon Saengkham	5
(England) Kyren Wilson	5
(China) Xiao Guodong	3
(England) Mark King	4
(England) Sanderson Lam	5
(England) Mark Joyce	5
(Scotland) Fraser Patrick	4
(Wales) Gareth Allen	0
(England) Ronnie O'Sullivan	5
(China) Zhou Yuelong	5
(England) Matthew Selt	1
(England) Paul Davison	0
(China) Ding Junhui	5
(Wales) Daniel Wells	5
(England) Jamie Cope	3
(Scotland) Alan McManus	1
(Wales) Matthew Stevens	5
(India) Aditya Mehta	4
(China) Li Hang	5
(Scotland) Stephen Maguire	5
(Republic of Ireland) Fergal O'Brien	3
(England) Andrew Higginson	5
(England) David Gilbert	3
(China) Niu Zhuang	1
(England) Ricky Walden	5
(England) Jimmy Robertson	0
(England) Martin O'Donnell	5
(England) Alfie Burden	0
(England) Mark Selby	5

Last 32; Best of 9 frames
(England) Judd Trump	5
(Scotland) Eden Sharav	0
(China) Tian Pengfei	5
(England) Martin Gould	3
(England) Mike Dunn	3
(England) Rory McLeod	5
(England) Ben Woollaston	4
(Iran) Hossein Vafaei	5
(England) Shaun Murphy	5
(England) Gary Wilson	1
(England) Ali Carter	3
(Wales) Michael White	5
(England) Michael Holt	2
(Wales) Mark Williams	5
(England) Mark Davis	2
(Scotland) John Higgins	5
(England) Stuart Bingham	5
(Thailand) Noppon Saengkham	2
(England) Kyren Wilson	5
(England) Sanderson Lam	2
(England) Mark Joyce	5
(England) Ronnie O'Sullivan	4
(China) Zhou Yuelong	0
(China) Ding Junhui	5
(Wales) Daniel Wells	5
(Wales) Matthew Stevens	2
(China) Li Hang	3
(Scotland) Stephen Maguire	5
(England) Andrew Higginson	5
(England) Ricky Walden	4
(England) Martin O'Donnell	1
(England) Mark Selby	5

Last 16; Best of 9 frames
(England) Judd Trump	5
(China) Tian Pengfei	3
(England) Rory McLeod	3
(Iran) Hossein Vafaei	5
(England) Shaun Murphy	5
(Wales) Michael White	1
(Wales) Mark Williams	5
(Scotland) John Higgins	4
(England) Stuart Bingham	2
(England) Kyren Wilson	5
(England) Mark Joyce	3
(China) Ding Junhui	5
(Wales) Daniel Wells	1
(Scotland) Stephen Maguire	5
(England) Andrew Higginson	4
(England) Mark Selby	5

Quarter-finals; Best of 9 frames
(England) Judd Trump	3
(Iran) Hossein Vafaei	5
(England) Shaun Murphy	1
(Wales) Mark Williams	5
(England) Kyren Wilson	5
(China) Ding Junhui	1
(Scotland) Stephen Maguire	1
(England) Mark Selby	5

Semi-finals; Best of 11 frames
(Iran) Hossein Vafaei	1
(Wales) Mark Williams	6
(England) Kyren Wilson	4
(England) Mark Selby	6

Final; Best of 19 frames
(Wales) Mark Williams	8
(England) Mark Selby	10

== Final ==
Final: Best of 19 frames. Referee: Jan Verhaas. Beijing University Students' Gymnasium, Beijing, China, 2 April 2017.
Mark Williams; Wales	8–10	Mark Selby; England
Afternoon: 9–122 (54), 3–100 (100), 124–0 (124), 6–113 (109), 82–1 (82), 46–73 (50), 71–47, 23–80, 106–32 (106); Evеning: 75–1 (68), 22–76 (55), 91–29 (65), 81–0 (81), 0–99 (95), 70–55, 0–70 (70), 4–129 (124), 16–86
124	Highest break	124
2	Century breaks	3
6	50+ breaks	8

== Qualifying ==
These matches were played from 24 to 27 January 2017 at the Guild Hall in Preston, England, except for 4 matches which were held over and played in Beijing on 27 March 2017. All matches were best of 9 frames.

(England) Judd Trump	5–0 (Note: Match held over and played in Beijing.)	(England) Jason Weston
(England) Anthony Hamilton	2–5	(England) Ashley Hugill
(Wales) Jamie Jones	3–5	(Scotland) Eden Sharav
(Wales) Dominic Dale	2–5	(Scotland) Ross Muir
(Scotland) Anthony McGill	5–1	(England) Peter Lines
(China) Tian Pengfei	5–1	(Wales) Ian Preece
(England) Martin Gould	5–2	(Wales) Lee Walker
(England) Robbie Williams	5–1	(England) Jamie Curtis-Barrett
(England) Mike Dunn	5–2	(England) Elliot Slessor
(Belgium) Luca Brecel	3–5	(England) Andy Hicks
(England) Rory McLeod	5–2	(England) Daniel Womersley
(China) Liang Wenbo	5–0	(Brazil) Itaro Santos
(Norway) Kurt Maflin	5–1	(England) Adam Duffy
(England) Ben Woollaston	5–1	(Brazil) Igor Figueiredo
(Thailand) Dechawat Poomjaeng	4–5	(Iran) Hossein Vafaei
(England) Joe Perry	5–0	(Wales) David John
(England) Shaun Murphy	5–1	(England) Sydney Wilson
(Republic of Ireland) Ken Doherty	3–5	(England) Allan Taylor
(Scotland) Graeme Dott	5–3	(Wales) Jak Jones
(England) Gary Wilson	5–2	(Wales) Duane Jones
(England) Ali Carter	w/o–w/d	(Pakistan) Hamza Akbar
(England) Stuart Carrington	5–1	(China) Wang Yuchen
(Wales) Michael White	5–4	(Thailand) Kritsanut Lertsattayathorn
(China) Yu Delu	5–0	(England) Hammad Miah
(England) Sam Baird	4–5	(England) Jimmy White
(England) Michael Holt	5–4	(England) Liam Highfield
(England) Oliver Lines	3–5	(China) Zhang Anda
(Wales) Mark Williams	5–3	(China) Zhao Xintong
(England) Peter Ebdon	2–5	(Scotland) Rhys Clark
(England) Mark Davis	5–0	(China) Yan Bingtao
(England) Ian Burns	5–1	(Malaysia) Thor Chuan Leong
(Scotland) John Higgins	5–0	(Isle of Man) Darryl Hill

(England) Stuart Bingham	5–4	(Thailand) James Wattana
(England) Chris Wakelin	2–5	(Scotland) Scott Donaldson
(England) Robert Milkins	5–3	(China) Mei Xiwen
(England) Tom Ford	3–5	(Thailand) Noppon Saengkham
(England) Kyren Wilson	5–2	(Cyprus) Michael Georgiou
(China) Xiao Guodong	5–3	(England) John Astley
(England) Mark King	5–1	(Scotland) Marc Davis
(England) David Grace	2–5	(England) Sanderson Lam
(England) Mark Joyce	5–4	(England) Mitchell Mann
(Wales) Ryan Day	2–5	(Scotland) Fraser Patrick
(Finland) Robin Hull	4–5	(Wales) Gareth Allen
(England) Ronnie O'Sullivan	5–3	(England) James Cahill
(China) Zhou Yuelong	5–4	(England) Michael Wild
(England) Matthew Selt	5–0	(England) Craig Steadman
(Northern Ireland) Joe Swail	3–5	(England) Paul Davison
(China) Ding Junhui	5–3	(England) Sean O'Sullivan
(Hong Kong) Marco Fu	3–5	(Wales) Daniel Wells
(England) Rod Lawler	2–5	(England) Jamie Cope
(Scotland) Alan McManus	5–1	(China) Chen Zhe
(Wales) Matthew Stevens	5–3	(Republic of Ireland) Josh Boileau
(England) Barry Hawkins	2–5	(India) Aditya Mehta
(China) Li Hang	5–3	(China) Fang Xiongman
(Scotland) Stephen Maguire	5–0	(Thailand) Boonyarit Keattikun
(Republic of Ireland) Fergal O'Brien	5–3	(England) Nigel Bond
(England) Andrew Higginson	5–1	(England) Christopher Keogan
(England) David Gilbert	5–1	(Australia) Kurt Dunham
(England) Jack Lisowski	1–5	(Malta) Alex Borg
(England) Ricky Walden	5–1	(China) Zhang Yong
(England) Jimmy Robertson	5–3	(China) Cao Yupeng
(Thailand) Thepchaiya Un-Nooh	4–5	(England) Martin O'Donnell
(England) Alfie Burden	5–2	(Thailand) Sunny Akani
(England) Mark Selby	5–3	(Poland) Adam Stefanów

== Century breaks ==
=== Televised stage centuries ===
Total: 54

- 147, 135, 122, 108, 105, 102 – Judd Trump
- 140 – Zhang Anda
- 138, 127, 123, 109 – Ding Junhui
- 137, 108 – Mark Joyce
- 136, 126, 124, 113, 109, 104, 101, 100 – Mark Selby
- 135, 118, 101 – Michael White
- 133, 124 – Martin O'Donnell
- 132, 106 – Ronnie O'Sullivan
- 131 – David Gilbert
- 130, 101 – Kyren Wilson
- 129, 114, 100 – Stephen Maguire
- 125 – Ricky Walden
- 124, 106, 103 – Mark Williams
- 123 – Gary Wilson
- 120 – Xiao Guodong
- 114 – Martin Gould
- 113, 104, 101, 101 – Shaun Murphy
- 109 – Aditya Mehta
- 108 – Rory McLeod
- 106, 100 – Hossein Vafaei
- 106 – Rhys Clark
- 105 – Andrew Higginson
- 103, 100 – Ben Woollaston
- 103 – Daniel Wells

=== Qualifying stage centuries ===
Total: 22

- 137 – Marco Fu
- 136 – Joe Perry
- 134 – Liam Highfield
- 130 – Stuart Carrington
- 126 – Luca Brecel
- 125 – Stephen Maguire
- 125 – Stuart Bingham
- 119 – Lee Walker
- 116 – Fraser Patrick
- 115 – Tian Pengfei
- 113 – Mitchell Mann
- 111 – Mark King
- 108 – Rhys Clark
- 107 – Ronnie O'Sullivan
- 107 – Michael Holt
- 104 – John Astley
- 102 – Jamie Jones
- 102 – Martin Gould
- 102 – Zhou Yuelong
- 101 – Fergal O'Brien
- 100 – Gary Wilson
- 100 – Xiao Guodong
