= 2011 China Open =

2011 China Open may refer to:

- 2011 China Open (snooker), a snooker tournament
- 2011 China Open (tennis), a tennis tournament
- 2011 China Open Super Series Premier, an edition of the China Open badminton tournament
