= Beijing International Challenge =

Tournament information
- Venue: Beijing University Students' Gymnasium
- Location: Beijing
- Country: China
- Established: 2009
- Organisation(s): 110 Sport Management Group
- Format: Non-ranking event
- Final year: 2010
- Final champion: (China) Tian Pengfei

The Beijing International Challenge (also known as BTV Cup) was a professional non-ranking snooker tournament organised by 110 Sport. The last champion was Tian Pengfei.

== History ==
The event was first held in 2009, organised by 110 Sport Management Group. It took place at the Beijing University Students' Gymnasium in Beijing, China. The event was organised on a round robin basis, and the top two players in the groups advanced to the semi-finals.

== Winners ==
Year	Winner	Runner-up	Final score	Season
2009	(China) Liang Wenbo	(Scotland) Stephen Maguire	7–6	2009/10
2010	(China) Tian Pengfei	(Wales) Ryan Day	9–3	2010/11
