= 2011 China Open (snooker) =

Bank of Beijing China Open

Tournament information
- Dates: 28 March – 3 April 2011
- Venue: Beijing University Students' Gymnasium
- City: Beijing
- Country: China
- Organisation: World Snooker
- Format: Ranking event
- Total prize fund: £325,000
- Winner's share: £60,000
- Highest break: Robert Milkins (ENG) (142)

Final
- Champion: Judd Trump (ENG)
- Runner-up: Mark Selby (ENG)
- Score: 10–8

The 2011 Bank of Beijing China Open was a professional ranking snooker tournament that took place between 28 March and 3 April 2011 at the Beijing University Students' Gymnasium in Beijing, China.

Mark Williams was the defending champion, but he lost 4–5 against Stephen Lee in the first round, despite making four century breaks.

Judd Trump won his first ranking title by defeating Mark Selby 10–8 in the final. Trump made his 100th career century during the final.

== Prize fund ==
The breakdown of prize money for this year is shown below:

- Winner: £60,000
- Runner-up: £30,000
- Semi-final: £15,000
- Quarter-final: £8,000
- Last 16: £5,925
- Last 32: £4,000
- Last 48: £2,200
- Last 64: £1,500
- Stage one highest break: £400
- Stage two highest break: £2,000
- Total: £325,000

== Wildcard round ==
These matches were played in Beijing on 28 & 29 March.

| Match | | Score | |
|---|---|---|---|
| WC1 | Kurt Maflin (NOR) | 5–3 | Cao Yupeng (CHN) |
| WC2 | Marcus Campbell (SCO) | 5–3 | Mei Xiwen (CHN) |
| WC3 | Robert Milkins (ENG) | 5–1 | Rouzi Maimaiti (CHN) |
| WC4 | Jimmy White (ENG) | w/d–w/o | Tian Pengfei (CHN) |
| WC5 | Nigel Bond (ENG) | 5–3 | Jin Long (CHN) |
| WC6 | Ken Doherty (IRL) | 1–5 | Li Hang (CHN) |
| WC7 | Joe Perry (ENG) | 5–2 | Li Yan (CHN) |
| WC8 | Gerard Greene (NIR) | 5–2 | Yu Delu (CHN) |

== Main draw ==
Last 32; Best of 9 frames
1 | (Wales) Mark Williams | 4
(England) Stephen Lee | 5
10 | (England) Ronnie O'Sullivan | 2
(Wales) Ryan Day | 5
13 | (Scotland) Stephen Hendry | 5
(Wales) Matthew Stevens | 0
5 | (China) Ding Junhui | 5
(Norway) Kurt Maflin | 4
8 | (England) Ali Carter | 5
(England) Stuart Bingham | 1
11 | (Northern Ireland) Mark Allen | 4
(Scotland) Marcus Campbell | 5
14 | (England) Jamie Cope | 3
(England) Robert Milkins | 5
4 | (England) Mark Selby | 5
(China) Tian Pengfei | 3
3 | (Scotland) John Higgins | 5
(England) Nigel Bond | 3
15 | (England) Ricky Walden | 5
(England) Martin Gould | 4
9 | (Scotland) Graeme Dott | 4
(China) Li Hang | 5
7 | (England) Shaun Murphy | 5
(England) Joe Perry | 3
6 | (Scotland) Stephen Maguire | 3
(England) Mark Davis | 5
16 | (Hong Kong) Marco Fu | 3
(England) Judd Trump | 5
12 | (England) Peter Ebdon | 5
(Northern Ireland) Gerard Greene | 2
2 | (Australia) Neil Robertson | 5
(England) Barry Hawkins | 1

Last 16; Best of 9 frames
(England) Stephen Lee | 5
(Wales) Ryan Day | 2
13 | (Scotland) Stephen Hendry | 2
5 | (China) Ding Junhui | 5
8 | (England) Ali Carter | 5
(Scotland) Marcus Campbell | 3
(England) Robert Milkins | 1
4 | (England) Mark Selby | 5
3 | (Scotland) John Higgins | 5
15 | (England) Ricky Walden | 2
(China) Li Hang | 4
7 | (England) Shaun Murphy | 5
(England) Mark Davis | 2
(England) Judd Trump | 5
12 | (England) Peter Ebdon | 5
2 | (Australia) Neil Robertson | 1

Quarter-finals; Best of 9 frames
(England) Stephen Lee | 2
5 | (China) Ding Junhui | 5
8 | (England) Ali Carter | 1
4 | (England) Mark Selby | 5
3 | (Scotland) John Higgins | 2
7 | (England) Shaun Murphy | 5
(England) Judd Trump | 5
12 | (England) Peter Ebdon | 1

Semi-finals; Best of 11 frames
5 | (China) Ding Junhui | 3
4 | (England) Mark Selby | 6
7 | (England) Shaun Murphy | 1
(England) Judd Trump | 6

Final; Best of 19 frames
4 | (England) Mark Selby | 8
(England) Judd Trump | 10

== Final ==
Final: Best of 19 frames. Referee: Leo Scullion. Beijing University Students' Gymnasium, Beijing, China, 3 April 2011.
| Mark Selby (4); England | 8–10 | Judd Trump; England |
Afternoon: 0–104 (104), 101–21 (88), 46–76, 0–104 (104), 90–34 (90), 53–69 (53, 55), 39–67 (61), 66–65 (Selby 62); Evening: 49–89 (68), 132–0 (132), 66–0 (66), 0–113 (113), 134–0 (134), 40–72, 124–7 (124), 84–31, 49–60 (57), 41–57 (57)
| 134 | Highest break | 113 |
| 3 | Century breaks | 3 |
| 8 | 50+ breaks | 8 |

== Qualifying ==
These matches took place between 24 and 27 February 2011 at the World Snooker Academy, Sheffield, England.

Round 1 Best of 9 frames
(Northern Ireland) Patrick Wallace | 2
(China) Zhang Anda | 5
(China) Liu Song | 5
(Thailand) Noppon Saengkham | 1
(China) Xiao Guodong | 5
(Northern Ireland) Dermot McGlinchey | 2
(England) Simon Bedford | 2
(Norway) Kurt Maflin | 5
(Wales) Andrew Pagett | 2
(Republic of Ireland) Joe Delaney | 5
(England) Liam Highfield | 5
(England) Jamie O'Neill | 2
(Republic of Ireland) David Morris | 4
(England) David Gilbert | 5
(China) Liu Chuang | 5
(Wales) Jak Jones | 3
(Brazil) Igor Figueiredo | 2
(England) Kuldesh Johal | 5
(Thailand) Thanawat Thirapongpaiboon | 1
(Thailand) Issara Kachaiwong | 5
(Thailand) James Wattana | 5
(England) Justin Astley | 2
(England) Ben Woollaston | 5
(England) Reanne Evans | 1
(England) Paul Davison | 5
(England) Adam Wicheard | 3
(Wales) Michael White | 5
(Republic of Ireland) Michael Judge | 3

Round 2 Best of 9 frames
(England) Alfie Burden | 5
(China) Zhang Anda | 1
(England) Adrian Gunnell | 0
(China) Liu Song | 5
(England) Joe Jogia | 5
(China) Xiao Guodong | 2
(England) Jack Lisowski | 4
(Norway) Kurt Maflin | 5
(England) Jimmy Robertson | 3
(Republic of Ireland) Joe Delaney | 5
(England) Barry Pinches | 5
(England) Liam Highfield | 3
(England) Ian McCulloch | 0
(England) David Gilbert | 5
(England) Jimmy White | 5
(China) Liu Chuang | 3
(Belgium) Bjorn Haneveer | 5
(England) Kuldesh Johal | 3
(Wales) Jamie Jones | 2
(Scotland) James McBain | 5
(England) Andy Hicks | 1
(Thailand) Issara Kachaiwong | 5
(England) Rod Lawler | 5
(England) Kyren Wilson | 1
(England) Stuart Pettman | 2
(Thailand) James Wattana | 5
(Scotland) Anthony McGill | 0
(England) Ben Woollaston | 5
(England) Matthew Couch | 5
(England) Paul Davison | 4
(Northern Ireland) Joe Swail | 5
(Wales) Michael White | 3

Round 3 Best of 9 frames
(England) Matthew Selt | 4
(England) Alfie Burden | 5
(England) Tom Ford | 5
(China) Liu Song | 3
(England) Anthony Hamilton | 5
(England) Joe Jogia | 0
(England) Dave Harold | 1
(Norway) Kurt Maflin | 5
(England) Mark Joyce | 5
(Republic of Ireland) Joe Delaney | 1
(England) Rory McLeod | 5
(England) Barry Pinches | 2
(England) Robert Milkins | 5
(England) David Gilbert | 4
(England) Peter Lines | 3
(England) Jimmy White | 5
(England) Nigel Bond | 5
(Belgium) Bjorn Haneveer | 4
(England) Mike Dunn | 5
(Scotland) James McBain | 2
(Malta) Tony Drago | 2
(Thailand) Issara Kachaiwong | 5
(England) Michael Holt | 3
(England) Rod Lawler | 5
(England) Steve Davis | 4
(Thailand) James Wattana | 5
(Scotland) Jamie Burnett | 3
(England) Ben Woollaston | 5
(Republic of Ireland) Fergal O'Brien | 5
(England) Matthew Couch | 3
(Scotland) Alan McManus | 3
(Northern Ireland) Joe Swail | 5

Round 4 Best of 9 frames
(England) Stephen Lee | 5
(England) Alfie Burden | 4
(Wales) Ryan Day | 5
(England) Tom Ford | 1
(Wales) Matthew Stevens | 5
(England) Anthony Hamilton | 1
(England) Mark King | 1
(Norway) Kurt Maflin | 5
(England) Stuart Bingham | 5
(England) Mark Joyce | 2
(Scotland) Marcus Campbell | 5
(England) Rory McLeod | 3
(England) Andrew Higginson | 2
(England) Robert Milkins | 5
(Wales) Dominic Dale | 2
(England) Jimmy White | 5
(China) Liang Wenbo | 3
(England) Nigel Bond | 5
(England) Martin Gould | 5
(England) Mike Dunn | 2
(Republic of Ireland) Ken Doherty | 5
(Thailand) Issara Kachaiwong | 0
(England) Joe Perry | 5
(England) Rod Lawler | 2
(England) Mark Davis | 5
(Thailand) James Wattana | 3
(England) Judd Trump | 5
(England) Ben Woollaston | 1
(Northern Ireland) Gerard Greene | 5
(Republic of Ireland) Fergal O'Brien | 2
(England) Barry Hawkins | 5
(Northern Ireland) Joe Swail | 2

== Century breaks ==
=== Qualifying stage centuries ===
- 140, 117, 115, 103 – Kurt Maflin
- 138 – Jimmy Robertson
- 137 – Tony Drago
- 136 – Stuart Pettman
- 134 – Mark King
- 130 – Ben Woollaston
- 120 – Dominic Dale
- 120 – Martin Gould
- 116, 106 – Jack Lisowski
- 112, 101 – David Gilbert
- 109 – Judd Trump
- 107 – Jamie Burnett
- 107 – Robert Milkins
- 105 – Matthew Couch
- 105 – Ken Doherty
- 102 – Anthony Hamilton

=== Televised stage centuries ===
- 142, 114 – Robert Milkins
- 139, 134, 132, 131, 130, 129, 124, 102 – Mark Selby
- 138 – Nigel Bond
- 137, 113, 104, 100 – Mark Williams
- 137 – Mark Davis
- 134, 133, 126, 120, 117 – Ding Junhui
- 133, 117 – Li Hang
- 130, 113, 104, 104 – Judd Trump
- 128 – Barry Hawkins
- 124 – Neil Robertson
- 123 – Ronnie O'Sullivan
- 117 – Yu Delu
- 108 – Shaun Murphy
- 107 – John Higgins
- 106 – Joe Perry
- 103 – Kurt Maflin
- 101 – Tian Pengfei
- 100 – Stephen Hendry
- 100 – Ryan Day
