= Khaled Belaid Abumdas =

Libyan snooker player (born 1987)

Personal information
- Born: 20 January 1987 (age 39)

Sport
- Country: Libya
- Sport: Snooker
- Professional: 2013–2015
- Highest ranking: 114 (June–July 2014)

Khaled Belaid Abumdas (born 20 January 1987), also spelled Khalid, is a Libyan former professional snooker player. He is the first professional snooker player from Libya, competing on the main tour between 2013 and 2015.

== Career ==
Abumdas won a place on the main tour for the 2013–14 and 2014–15 seasons after finishing runner up to Peter Francisco in the 2013 ABSF African Snooker Championship. However, his opening season started late in November due to visa issues and he lost all of his five matches winning only five frames, with his best result being a 5–2 defeat to former top 16 player Ryan Day in the qualifying rounds for the 2014 China Open. He finished the season ranked last at 131st in the world.

Abumdas did not enter any tournaments of the 2014–15 season and dropped off the tour.

== Performance and rankings timeline ==
Tournament	2013/ 14
Ranking (Note: It shows the ranking at the beginning of the season.)	(Note: New players on the Main Tour don't have a ranking.)
Ranking tournaments
German Masters	LQ
Welsh Open	1R
World Open	LQ
China Open	LQ
World Championship	LQ

Performance Table Legend
LQ	lost in the qualifying draw	#R	lost in the early rounds of the tournament (WR = Wildcard round, RR = Round robin)	QF	lost in the quarter-finals
SF	lost in the semi-finals	F	lost in the final	W	won the tournament
DNQ	did not qualify for the tournament	A	did not participate in the tournament	WD	withdrew from the tournament

NH / Not Held	means an event was not held.
NR / Non-Ranking Event	means an event is/was no longer a ranking event.
R / Ranking Event	means an event is/was a ranking event.
MR / Minor-Ranking Event	means an event is/was a minor-ranking event.
