= Tian Pengfei =

Chinese snooker player (born 1987)

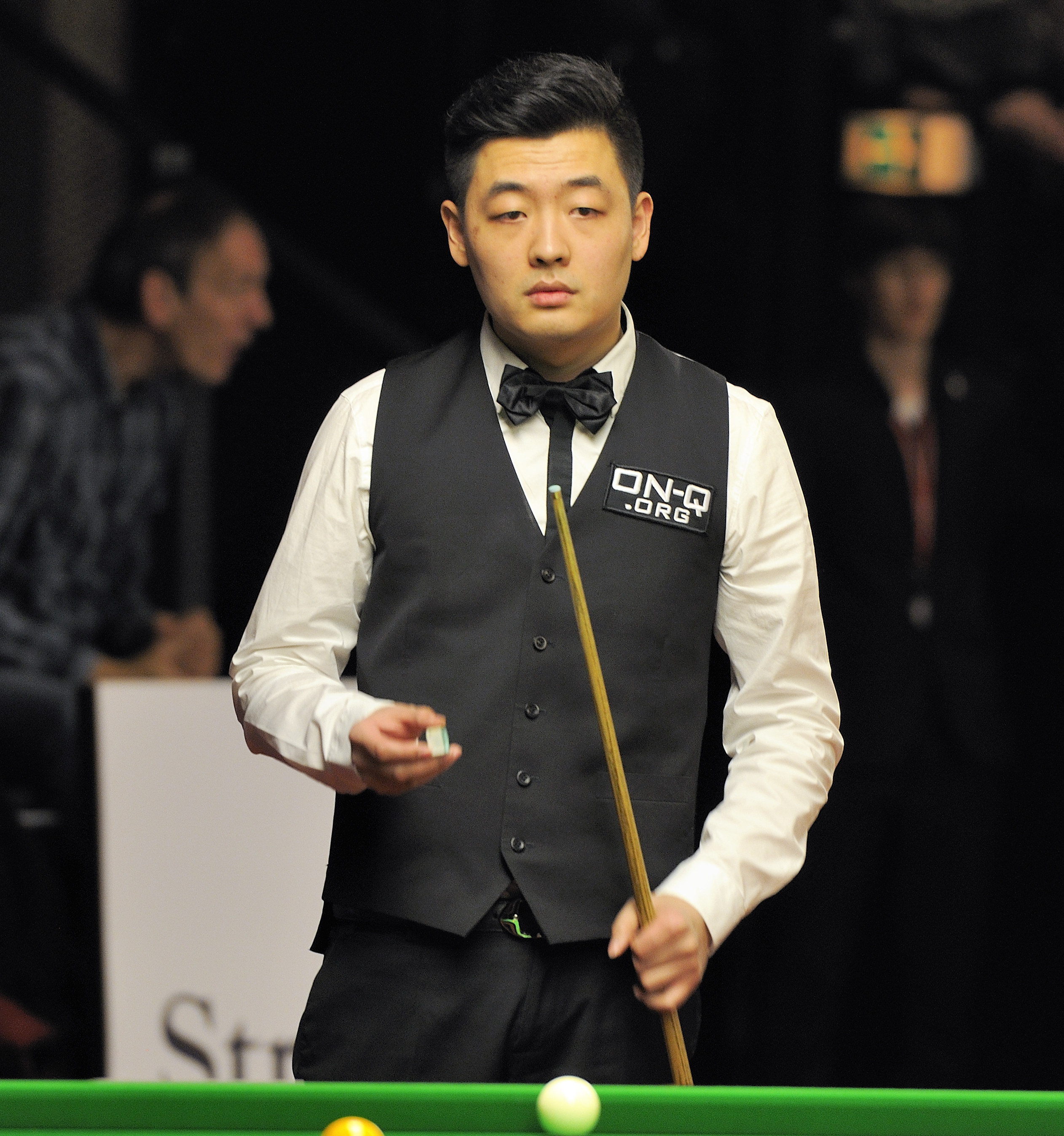
- Tian at the 2014 German Masters

Personal information
- Born: August 16, 1987 (age 39) Dalian, Liaoning, China

Sport
- Country: China
- Sport: Snooker
- Professional: 2006–2008, 2011–2025
- Highest ranking: 41 (February 2023)
- Century breaks: 148
- Best ranking finish: Semi-final (2023 Welsh Open)
Medal record
Representing China
Men's snooker
Asian Games
Gold medal – first place	2006 Doha	Doubles
Gold medal – first place	2006 Doha	Team
Gold medal – first place	2010 Guangzhou	Team
Asian Indoor and Martial Arts Games
Gold medal – first place	2013 Incheon	Team
East Asian Games
Gold medal – first place	2009 Hong Kong	Singles
Bronze medal – third place	2009 Hong Kong	Team
Men's six-red snooker
East Asian Games
Silver medal – second place	2009 Hong Kong	Singles

Tian Pengfei
- Simplified Chinese: 田鹏飞
- Traditional Chinese: 田鵬飛
Transcriptions
Standard Mandarin
- Hanyu Pinyin: Tián Péngfēi
Yue: Cantonese
- Yale Romanization: Tìhn Pàahng Fēi
- Jyutping: Tin⁴ Paang⁴ Fei¹

Tian Pengfei (Chinese: 田鹏飞; born 16 August 1987) is a Chinese former professional snooker player. He began his career by playing the Challenge Tour in 2004, at the time the second-level professional tour. Tian played on the Main Tour in 2006 and competed on the World Snooker Tour for two seasons until he dropped off in 2008. He won the Beijing International Challenge, and returned to the Main Tour the following year, playing for 15 consecutive seasons before losing his tour place after the 2025 World Championship.

== Career ==
Tian first competed on the Main Tour in the 2006–07 season, dropping off the tour in the following season. During the season, Tian also received a one-year ban from China's cue sports administration, following an investigation into allegations that he had sexually abused and beaten his fellow team-mate, Zhou Mengmeng, at the Doha Asian Games in 2006, in which she subsequently gave a formal apology regarding this.

As a wild card, Tian defeated Ronnie O'Sullivan 5–3 in the last 32 of the 2010 China Open at the Students University Stadium in Beijing. In an astonishing finish to the match, O'Sullivan missed a simple final black off its spot which would have levelled the score at 4–4. He also recorded some impressive victories in the Wuxi Classic, by beating Mark Selby 5–3 and Joe Perry 5–1, before being whitewashed 6–0 by Ding Junhui. Despite these results, he was not awarded a wild card by World Snooker to compete on the main tour.

The next professional tournament he competed in was the Beijing International Challenge. In the group stages he recorded wins over Stephen Hendry and Stephen Maguire, before beating Liang Wenbo 6–4 and Ryan Day 9–3 to win the title.

=== 2011/2012 season ===
Tian qualified for the 2011–12 main tour as a semi-finalist from the second 2011 Q School event. As an unranked player, Tian would need to win four matches to qualify for the main draw of the ranking event tournaments. He failed to do this throughout the season, coming closest in his first event, the Australian Goldfields Open. He won his first two matches against Aditya Mehta and Anthony McGill (making three centuries in a 5–1 win) before being given a bye into the final qualifying round due to the withdrawal of Anthony Hamilton. In the final round Tian lost 4–5 to Mark Davis. Tian finished the year ranked world number 78, out of the top 64 who guarantee their places for the 2012–13 season. However, he was awarded the first nomination from the Chinese national governing body for a spot on the tour, guaranteeing him entry into all the ranking event qualifiers in the upcoming season.

=== 2012/2013 season ===
Tian could not qualify for the main draw of any of the ranking events during the season. However, he had a very good season in the minor-ranking Players Tour Championship Events. At the second European Tour Event he won four matches which included a last 16 triumph over top 16 player Stuart Bingham to reach the quarter-finals, where he was whitewashed 0–4 by Neil Robertson. Tian went one better at the sixth European Tour Event with wins over the likes of Jamie Burnett, Mark Davis and Martin Gould in the quarter-finals to advance to the semis. There he lost 2–4 to Mark Selby, but finished a lofty 30th on the PTC Order of Merit, just outside the top 26 who qualified for the Finals. Tian's season ended when he was beaten 7–10 by Jimmy White in the second round of World Championship Qualifying, to finish the campaign ranked world number 70.

=== 2013/2014 season ===
In his opening match, Tian defeated Luca Brecel 5–3 to qualify for the 2013 Wuxi Classic in China where he was whitewashed 5–0 by Jack Lisowski in the first round. He then lost in the qualifying rounds for three successive events, but reached the first round of the International Championship with a 6–0 thrashing of Alexander Ursenbacher. He faced Mark Allen and was beaten 6–1. Tian edged past Michael Wasley 5–4 to play in the German Masters, where he matched the best performance in a ranking event of his career. He saw off Andrew Higginson 5–3 in the first round and then recorded the finest result of his career so far by beating world number one Neil Robertson 5–1. His last 16 match against Rod Lawler went to the colours in the deciding frame with Lawler potting the brown, blue and pink to win 5–4. Tian was eliminated in the first round of the World Open by Graeme Dott and went a stage further at the China Open, but lost 5–3 against Mike Dunn. He ended the season ranked world number 66, falling just short of the top 64 who remain on tour. Tian entered the 2014 Q School and won a two-year tour card for the 2014–15 and 2015–16 seasons in the first event, whitewashing Eden Sharav 4–0 in his final match.

=== 2014/2015 season ===
Tian beat Ronnie O'Sullivan 4–2 to reach the quarter-finals of the Paul Hunter Classic, where he lost 4–3 to Judd Trump from 3–2 up. He was knocked out at the same stage of the Haining City Open 4–2 by Jimmy Robertson. Tian lost 6–3 in the first round of the UK Championship and won his first ranking event match of the season 4–2 against Tom Ford at the Welsh Open. He was beaten 4–1 by Luca Brecel in the second round. A pair of 4–1 victories set up Tian's best run in a ranking event this year at the Indian Open, but he was thrashed 4–0 by Ricky Walden in the last 16.

=== 2015/2016 season ===
Tian defeated Noppon Saengkham and Yu Delu both 5–1 and Matthew Stevens 5–0 to play in the final qualifying round of the 2015 Shanghai Masters, losing 5–4 to Mark Davis. He eliminated reigning champion Shaun Murphy 4–1 to reach the quarter-finals of the Ruhr Open and then edged past Alan McManus and David Gilbert to progress through to his first professional final. Tian made a 106 break to trail Rory McLeod 3–2, but lost the next frame to finish as the event's runner-up. Wins over Cao Yupeng and Liang Wenbo saw him reach the third round of the International Championship, where he lost 6–1 to Mark Allen. He exited the UK Championship 6–2 to John Higgins in the second round. Tian's final earlier in the season ensured that he made his first appearance in the PTC Finals, but he lost 4–1 to Robert Milkins in the first round. At the China Open he defeated Barry Hawkins 5–4 and Michael Holt 5–2 to play Ricky Walden in the third round. Tian scored breaks of 87 and 64 to send the match into a deciding frame in which he led 41–0, but he would go on to lose. Tian is still looking for his debut at the World Championship after he lost 10–7 to Hossein Vafaei in the opening round of qualifying. However, his ranking rose by 34 places to end the season at a career-high 48th in the world.

=== 2016/2017 season ===
Tian lost 4–3 to Matthew Stevens in the second round of the Riga Masters after thrashing Allan Taylor 4–0. A string of qualifying defeats and first round exits followed until the Welsh Open in February 2017 where he overcame Chen Zhe 4–2, before losing 4–0 to Barry Hawkins in the second round. Tian's deepest run of the year was at the China Open, where wins over Anthony McGill and Martin Gould took him into the last 16. He was defeated 5–3 by Judd Trump.

In the World Championship Qualifiers, Tian beat compatriot Zhang Yong 10-4 before an epic match against Fergal O'Brien. In the deciding frame Tian successfully obtained three snookers before missing a difficult final pink, allowing O'Brien to win the match 10–9. That last frame took around 90 minutes and the match finished at 2:30am.

=== 2017/2018 season ===
Tian's best result came in the Northern Ireland Open, where he beat Soheil Vahedi, Mark Allen, Noppon Saengkham and Chris Wakelin to reach his first ranking quarter-final. But he lost narrowly to teenage compatriot Lyu Haotian 5–4. In the World Championship qualifiers, Tian scored a memorable win over Yan Bingtao, but then lost badly to Chris Wakelin in the final qualifying match.

=== 2018/2019 season ===
Tian reached two more quarter-finals at the European Masters (where he beat Judd Trump) and the Gibraltar Open. In the World Championship qualifiers, Tian beat Soheil Vahedi, Ryan Day and Matthew Stevens to reach the Crucible for the first time. There, he played Stephen Maguire and appeared to have won the match when he led 9–7 with his opponent needing a snooker. However, Maguire got the snooker, fluked the blue, won the frame and eventually the match 10–9.

=== 2019/2020 season ===
With wins over Gerard Greene, Alan McManus, Dominic Dale and Si Jiahui, Tian reached the quarter-final of the English Open, but lost 5–0 to Tom Ford.

With the COVID-19 outbreak the season was suspended and Tian returned to Shanghai. He returned for the World Championship, but lost in the qualifiers to Sunny Akani.

=== 2020/2021 season ===
Tian's season was badly affected by a positive test for COVID-19, which forced him to self-isolate for several weeks.

His best performance came in the World Championship. With wins over Billy Castle, Sunny Akani and Graeme Dott, he qualified for the Crucible. There, he faced 4-times world champion John Higgins. Despite leading 7–4, Tian lost the match 10–7, attributing the slump to fatigue.

Tian finished the season ranked 58.

== Personal ==
Tian is known as one of the most approachable players on the tour. He speaks excellent English and has occasionally helped with interpretation at press conferences, notably in the 2017 Northern Ireland Open where he assisted several Chinese players, including Lyu Haotian, despite Lyu having beaten him in their quarter-final match.

Tian is a director at the Ding Junhui Snooker Academy in Sheffield, and also runs a restaurant with his wife.

== Performance and rankings timeline ==
Tournament	2004/ 05	2005/ 06	2006/ 07	2007/ 08	2008/ 09	2009/ 10	2010/ 11	2011/ 12	2012/ 13	2013/ 14	2014/ 15	2015/ 16	2016/ 17	2017/ 18	2018/ 19	2019/ 20	2020/ 21	2021/ 22	2022/ 23	2023/ 24	2024/ 25
Ranking (Note: From the 2010/2011 season it shows the ranking at the beginning of the season)	(Note: He was an amateur)		(Note: New players don't have a ranking)	69					(Note: Players qualified through Chinese nomination started the season without ranking points)	70	(Note: Players qualified through Q School started the season without prize money ranking points)	82	48	50	(Note: Players qualified One Year Ranking List started the season without ranking points)	67	54	58	63	53	52
Ranking tournaments
Championship League	Not Held			Non-Ranking Event													2R	A	RR	RR	RR
Xi'an Grand Prix	Tournament Not Held																				1R
Saudi Arabia Masters	Tournament Not Held																				3R
English Open	Tournament Not Held												1R	2R	1R	QF	1R	1R	1R	LQ	LQ
British Open	A	Tournament Not Held																1R	1R	1R	1R
Wuhan Open	Tournament Not Held																			LQ	1R
Northern Ireland Open	Tournament Not Held												1R	QF	2R	3R	WD	2R	3R	LQ	3R
International Championship	Tournament Not Held								LQ	1R	LQ	3R	WR	1R	1R	LQ	Not Held			1R	LQ
UK Championship	A	A	LQ	LQ	A	A	A	LQ	LQ	2R	1R	2R	1R	1R	3R	2R	2R	2R	LQ	LQ	LQ
Shoot Out	Tournament Not Held						Non-Ranking Event						2R	3R	4R	2R	1R	2R	1R	2R	1R
Scottish Open	Tournament Not Held								MR	Not Held			1R	1R	4R	2R	3R	LQ	2R	LQ	LQ
German Masters	Tournament Not Held						A	LQ	LQ	3R	LQ	1R	LQ	LQ	LQ	1R	WD	LQ	2R	1R	LQ
Welsh Open	A	A	LQ	2R	A	A	A	LQ	LQ	2R	2R	2R	2R	1R	1R	3R	1R	LQ	SF	1R	LQ
World Open (Note: The event was called the Grand Prix (2004/2005–2009/2010))	A	A	LQ	RR	A	A	A	LQ	LQ	1R	Not Held		LQ	1R	LQ	LQ	Not Held			1R	2R
World Grand Prix	Tournament Not Held										NR	1R	DNQ	DNQ	DNQ	DNQ	DNQ	DNQ	DNQ	DNQ	DNQ
Players Championship (Note: The event was called the Players Tour Championship Grand Final (2010/2011–2015/2016))	Tournament Not Held						DNQ	DNQ	DNQ	DNQ	DNQ	1R	DNQ	DNQ	DNQ	DNQ	DNQ	DNQ	DNQ	DNQ	DNQ
Tour Championship	Tournament Not Held														DNQ	DNQ	DNQ	DNQ	DNQ	DNQ	DNQ
World Championship	LQ	A	LQ	LQ	A	A	A	LQ	LQ	LQ	LQ	LQ	LQ	LQ	1R	LQ	1R	LQ	LQ	LQ	LQ
Non-ranking tournaments
The Masters	A	A	LQ	LQ	A	A	A	A	A	A	A	A	A	A	A	A	A	A	A	A	A
Former ranking tournaments
Northern Ireland Trophy	NH	NR	2R	LQ	A	Tournament Not Held															
Wuxi Classic (Note: The event was called the Jiangsu Classic (2008/2009–2009/2010))	Tournament Not Held				Non-Ranking Event				LQ	1R	A	Tournament Not Held									
Australian Goldfields Open	Tournament Not Held							LQ	LQ	LQ	A	A	Tournament Not Held								
Shanghai Masters	Not Held			WD	A	1R	WR	LQ	LQ	LQ	LQ	LQ	LQ	LQ	Non-Ranking		Not Held			Non-Ranking	
Paul Hunter Classic (Note: The event was called the Grand Prix Fürth (2004/2005) and the Fürth German Open (2005/2006–2006/2007))	Pro-am Event						Minor-Ranking Event						1R	A	A	NR	Tournament Not Held				
Indian Open	Tournament Not Held									LQ	3R	NH	LQ	2R	LQ	Tournament Not Held					
China Open	A	WR	LQ	LQ	2R	2R	1R	LQ	LQ	2R	LQ	3R	3R	LQ	LQ	Tournament Not Held					
Riga Masters (Note: The event was called the Riga Open (2014/2015–2015/2016))	Tournament Not Held										Minor-Rank		2R	2R	1R	WD	Tournament Not Held				
China Championship	Tournament Not Held												NR	1R	LQ	1R	Tournament Not Held				
WST Pro Series	Tournament Not Held																RR	Tournament Not Held			
Turkish Masters	Tournament Not Held																	1R	Not Held		
Gibraltar Open	Tournament Not Held											MR	2R	4R	QF	4R	2R	1R	Not Held		
WST Classic	Tournament Not Held																		3R	Not Held	
European Masters (Note: The event was called the Malta Cup (2004/2005–2007/2008))	A	A	LQ	NR	Tournament Not Held								LQ	LQ	QF	1R	1R	LQ	LQ	LQ	NH
Former non-ranking tournaments
Beijing International Challenge	Tournament Not Held					RR	W	Tournament Not Held													
Hainan Classic	Tournament Not Held						RR	Tournament Not Held													
Wuxi Classic	Tournament Not Held				A	A	SF	A	Ranking Event			Tournament Not Held									
General Cup (Note: The event was called the General Cup International (2004/2005–2011/2012))	A	Tournament Not Held				SF	NH	A	RR	A	A	A	Tournament Not Held								
Shoot Out	Tournament Not Held						A	A	1R	1R	A	1R	Ranking Event								
Six-red World Championship (Note: The event was called the Six-red Snooker International (2008/2009) and the Six-red World Grand Prix (2009/2010))	Tournament Not Held				A	A	A	NH	A	A	A	A	A	A	A	A	Not Held		LQ	Not Held	
Haining Open	Tournament Not Held										Minor-Rank		2R	2R	A	A	NH	A	NH	A	NH

Performance Table Legend
LQ	lost in the qualifying draw	#R	lost in the early rounds of the tournament (WR = Wildcard round, RR = Round robin)	QF	lost in the quarter-finals
SF	lost in the semi-finals	F	lost in the final	W	won the tournament
DNQ	did not qualify for the tournament	A	did not participate in the tournament	WD	withdrew from the tournament

NH / Not Held	means an event was not held.
NR / Non-Ranking Event	means an event is/was no longer a ranking event.
R / Ranking Event	means an event is/was a ranking event.
MR / Minor-Ranking Event	means an event is/was a minor-ranking event.

== Career finals ==
=== Minor-ranking finals: 1 ===
Outcome	No	Year	Tournament	Opponent in the final	Score
Runner-up	1.	2015	Ruhr Open	(England) Rory McLeod	2–4

=== Non-ranking finals: 2 (2 titles) ===
Outcome	No	Year	Tournament	Opponent in the final	Score
Winner	1.	2010	The China Classic	(China) Zhang Anda	5–3
Winner	2.	2010	Beijing International Challenge	(Wales) Ryan Day	9–3

=== Amateur finals: 3 (2 titles) ===
Outcome	No	Year	Tournament	Opponent in the final	Score
Winner	1.	2005	PIOS – Event 1	(England) Martin Gould	6–3
Runner-up	1	2005	IBSF World Under-21 Championship	(China) Liang Wenbo	9–11
Winner	2.	2006	PIOS – Event 7	(China) Liu Song	6–3
