= China Open (snooker) =

Snooker tournament in China

Tournament information
- Venue: Riverside Sports Centre
- Location: Taiyuan
- Country: China
- Established: 1985
- Organisation(s): World Snooker Tour; CBSA
- Format: Ranking event
- Total prize fund: £1,205,000
- Winner's share: £250,000
- Recent edition: 2026
- Current champion: Mark Selby (ENG)

The China Open is a professional ranking snooker tournament held by the World Snooker Tour and the Chinese Billiards and Snooker Association (CBSA), being first held in 1985 as the China Masters and has since been hosted in various locations in China. The event is now hosted in Taiyuan, Shanxi Province, and offers the highest prize fund of all ranking events in China. The current champion is Mark Selby who won the event in 2026.

== History ==
=== Early years ===
The first international snooker tournament in China was the China Masters which has staged on three occasions in 1985, 1986 and 1996. The inaugural 1985 edition, held in Guangzhou, was the first professional tournament to be played in China, and featured the two 1985 World Snooker Championship finalists Steve Davis and Dennis Taylor, with Davis winning the final 2–1. The following season Davis again won the competition, this time defeating Terry Griffiths 3–0 in the final. A third tournament was held in 1996 for lower-ranked players; Rod Lawler won this tournament defeating Shokat Ali 6–3 in the final.

The event rebranded as the China International in September 1997, a non-ranking tournament for the top 16 players and local players. The following season the tournament became ranking and was held in March. Then the name of the event was changed to China Open and was held in December, so there were two events in 1999. After the 2002 tournament the event was abandoned.

The former China Open logo used between 2007 and 2019

=== 2005-2019: Ding Junhui win and Beijing years ===
The event was revived for the 2004-05 snooker season. Local wild-card players were invited to play against the qualifiers. The three Chinese players on the tour were invited to play as wild-cards, rather than qualify the usual way. Ding Junhui was one of them, and he won the tournament, but as he entered as a wild-card, he received no prize money nor ranking points. The tournament win for Ding was later deemed as a major contributing factor to the rise in popularity of snooker in China. The tournament was also held annually since then, usually in early April as the last ranking event before the World Championship.

The tournament had largely stayed in Beijing, and since the 2018 edition it was held at the Olympic Sports Center in Chaoyang District. The 2020 edition was scheduled to take place, but the COVID-19 pandemic caused it to be cancelled: the subsequent restrictions meant it was not staged through 2021, 2022 and 2023. Despite the COVID restrictions ending in China, the tournament did not get immediately restored to the calendar, with new events in Wuhan and Xi'an being staged in its place.

=== Current editions ===
During the 2026 World Snooker Championship, after several months of rumours and speculation, it was confirmed that the event would be returning to the tour from the 2026-27 snooker season and is expected to run until at least 2028. Rather than being played directly before the World Championship, it is played in mid-August and utilises a new format that directly copies the format of the ranking Triple Crown events, whereby the Top 16 are seeded through to the venue and 144 players (which includes wildcards and other invited non-professional players) playing in qualifiers to reach the venue. The prize fund of £1,205,000 also mirrors the latest edition of the UK Championship at the time, making it the third-highest earning ranking event on the snooker calendar.

== Winners ==
Year	Winner	Runner-up	Final score	Venue	City	Season
China Masters (non-ranking)
1985	Steve Davis (ENG)	Dennis Taylor (NIR)	2–1	White Swan Hotel	Guangzhou	1985/86
1986	Steve Davis (ENG)	Terry Griffiths (WAL)	3–0	Huangpu Stadium	Shanghai	1986/87
1996	Rod Lawler (ENG)	Shokat Ali (PAK)	6–3	Haidian Gymnasium	Beijing	1995/96
China International (non-ranking)
1997	Steve Davis (ENG)	Jimmy White (ENG)	7–4	Haidian Gymnasium	Beijing	1997/98
China International (ranking)
1999	John Higgins (SCO)	Billy Snaddon (SCO)	9–3	JC Mandarin Hotel	Shanghai	1998/99
China Open (ranking)
1999	Ronnie O'Sullivan (ENG)	Stephen Lee (ENG)	9–2	JC Mandarin Hotel	Shanghai	1999/00
2000	Ronnie O'Sullivan (ENG)	Mark Williams (WAL)	9–3	Mission Hills Resort	Shenzhen	2000/01
2002	Mark Williams (WAL)	Anthony Hamilton (ENG)	9–8	Shanghai International Gymnastic Center	Shanghai	2001/02
2005	Ding Junhui (CHN)	Stephen Hendry (SCO)	9–5	Haidian Gymnasium	Beijing	2004/05
2006	Mark Williams (WAL)	John Higgins (SCO)	9–8	Beijing University Students' Gymnasium	Beijing	2005/06
2007	Graeme Dott (SCO)	Jamie Cope (ENG)	9–5	Beijing University Students' Gymnasium	Beijing	2006/07
2008	Stephen Maguire (SCO)	Shaun Murphy (ENG)	10–9	Beijing University Students' Gymnasium	Beijing	2007/08
2009	Peter Ebdon (ENG)	John Higgins (SCO)	10–8	Beijing University Students' Gymnasium	Beijing	2008/09
2010	Mark Williams (WAL)	Ding Junhui (CHN)	10–6	Beijing University Students' Gymnasium	Beijing	2009/10
2011	Judd Trump (ENG)	Mark Selby (ENG)	10–8	Beijing University Students' Gymnasium	Beijing	2010/11
2012	Peter Ebdon (ENG)	Stephen Maguire (SCO)	10–9	Beijing University Students' Gymnasium	Beijing	2011/12
2013	Neil Robertson (AUS)	Mark Selby (ENG)	10–6	Beijing University Students' Gymnasium	Beijing	2012/13
2014	Ding Junhui (CHN)	Neil Robertson (AUS)	10–5	Beijing University Students' Gymnasium	Beijing	2013/14
2015	Mark Selby (ENG)	Gary Wilson (ENG)	10–2	Beijing University Students' Gymnasium	Beijing	2014/15
2016	Judd Trump (ENG)	Ricky Walden (ENG)	10–4	Beijing University Students' Gymnasium	Beijing	2015/16
2017	Mark Selby (ENG)	Mark Williams (WAL)	10–8	Beijing University Students' Gymnasium	Beijing	2016/17
2018	Mark Selby (ENG)	Barry Hawkins (ENG)	11–3	Olympic Sports Center	Beijing	2017/18
2019	Neil Robertson (AUS)	Jack Lisowski (ENG)	11–4	Olympic Sports Center	Beijing	2018/19
2020	Cancelled due to the COVID-19 pandemic					2019/20
2026	Mark Selby (ENG)	Noppon Saengkham (THA)	10–6	Riverside Sports Centre	Taiyuan	2026/27

== Records ==
=== Finalists ===
Rank	Name	Nationality	Winner	Runner-up	Finals
1	**Mark Selby**	England	4	2	6
2	**Mark Williams**	Wales	3	2	5
3	**Ding Junhui**	China	2	1	3
3	**Neil Robertson**	Australia	2	1	3
5	**Ronnie O'Sullivan**	England	2	0	2
5	Peter Ebdon	England	2	0	2
5	**Judd Trump**	England	2	0	2
8	**Stephen Maguire**	Scotland	1	1	2
9	Graeme Dott	Scotland	1	0	1
10	**John Higgins**	Scotland	0	2	2
11	Stephen Lee	England	0	1	1
11	Anthony Hamilton	England	0	1	1
11	Stephen Hendry	Scotland	0	1	1
11	Jamie Cope	England	0	1	1
11	**Shaun Murphy**	England	0	1	1
11	**Gary Wilson**	England	0	1	1
11	**Ricky Walden**	England	0	1	1
11	**Barry Hawkins**	England	0	1	1
11	**Jack Lisowski**	England	0	1	1
11	**Noppon Saengkham**	Thailand	0	1	1

Legend
The names of active players are marked in **bold**.

=== Maximum breaks ===
- (Thailand) James Wattana (1997)
- (Cyprus) Mehmet Husnu (1999 (qualifiers))
- (Scotland) Stephen Maguire (2008)
- (Australia) Neil Robertson (2010)
- (England) Judd Trump (2017)
- (England) Ronnie O'Sullivan (2018)
- (England) Stuart Bingham (2018, 2019)
- (England) Michael Holt (2026 (qualifiers))

== See also ==
- China Championship
- Asian Classic
