= Li Yan (snooker player) =

Chinese snooker player

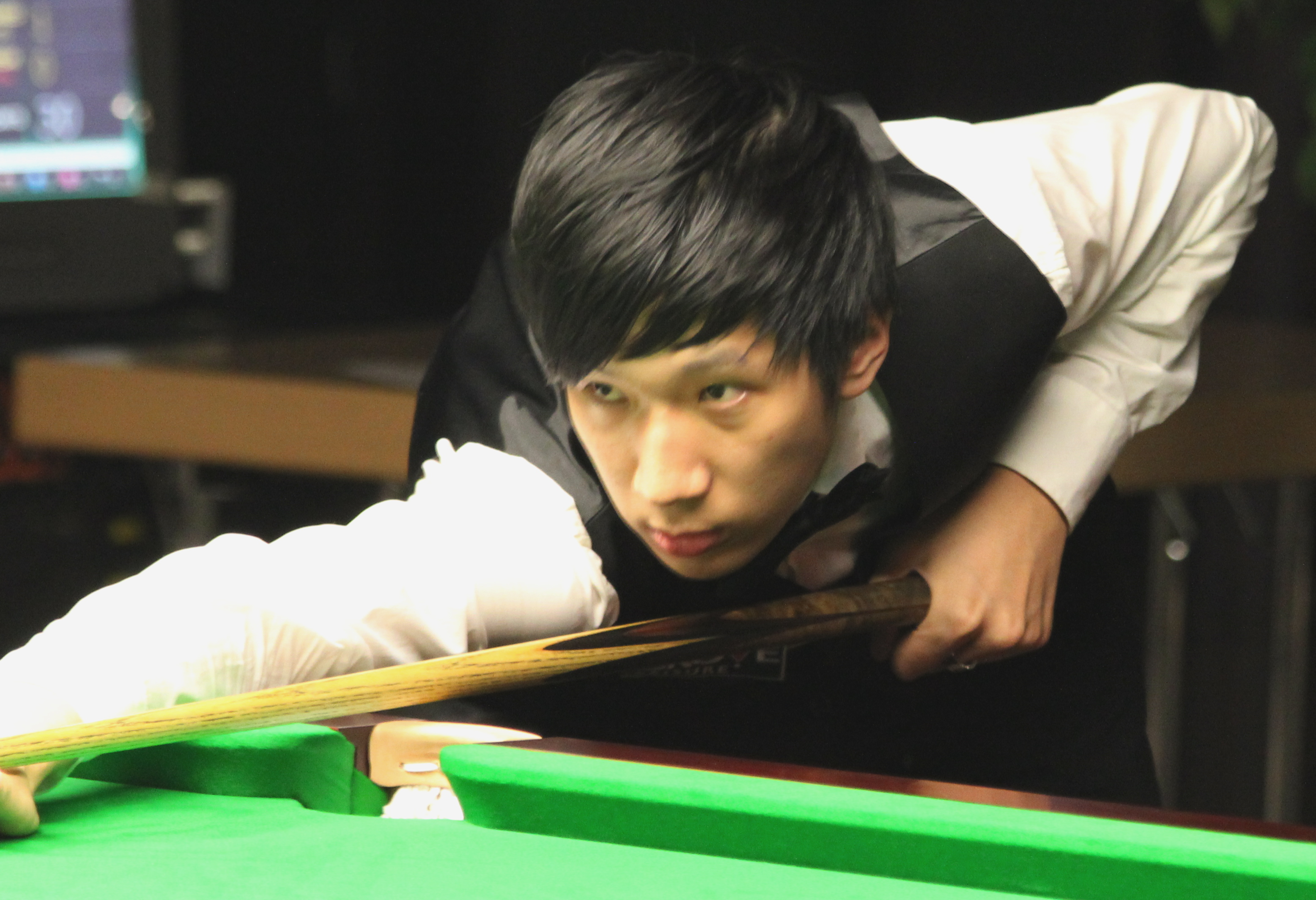
- Li Yan at the 2012 Paul Hunter Classic

Personal information
- Born: September 17, 1992 (age 34) Harbin, Heilongjiang, China

Sport
- Country: China
- Sport: Snooker
- Professional: 2011–2014
- Highest ranking: 64 (January–February 2012)
- Best ranking finish: Last 32 (x3)

Li Yan (Chinese: 李岩; born September 17, 1992) is a former professional snooker player from the People's Republic of China.

== Career ==
=== Early career ===
Li received a wild card for the 2008 Shanghai Masters, losing 1–5 to Anthony Hamilton. At the 2009 Shanghai Masters, he defeated Gerard Greene 5–4, before losing to Ryan Day in the last 32.

=== 2011/2012 season ===
Li qualified for the 2011/2012 professional Main Tour as one of four semi-finalists from the second 2011 Q School event. As a new player on the tour Li would need to win four matches in order to reach the main stage of the ranking tournaments. He accomplished this in qualifying for the second biggest tournament on the snooker calendar, the UK Championship, with wins over Stuart Carrington, Andy Hicks, Jack Lisowski and Fergal O'Brien. He faced former world champion Shaun Murphy in the first round of the event and was beaten 3–6. He could not qualify for another tournament for the remainder of the season but did play in all 12 of the PTC events throughout the season reaching, but not progressing past, the last 16 on three occasions.

Li finished the season ranked world number 67, just outside the top 64 who retain their places on the tour. However, due to being ranked 43rd on the PTC Order of Merit he secured one of the eight spots for the highest non-qualified players to play in the 2012/2013 season.

=== 2012/2013 season ===
Li only won two matches in ranking event qualifiers in the 2012/2013 season. His best results in the minor-ranking Players Tour Championship events were last 16 losses in the third Asian PTC and the fourth European Tour Event, to Stuart Bingham and Rory McLeod respectively. He lost seven consecutive games after this, before beating Robbie Williams 10–7 in the first round of World Championship Qualifying, but his season was ended when he lost 10–2 to Jimmy Robertson in the following round. Li dropped 17 places in the rankings during the year to finish it at world number 84.

=== 2013/2014 season ===
The first ranking tournament Li could qualify for in the 2013/2014 season was the Indian Open by beating Peter Lines 4–2. He then edged out Jeff Cundy 4–3 to record his first ever win in the main draw of a ranking event, before being thrashed 4–0 by John Higgins. Li also qualified for the International Championship and World Open during the season, losing to compatriots Liang Wenbo and Ding Junhui in the first round. He won more than one match in an event for the only time this season in the World Championship qualifiers by defeating Elliot Slessor 10–5, Dave Harold 10–3 and Joe Swail 10–8, to be just one win away from reaching The Crucible for the first time, but he was thoroughly outplayed by Xiao Guodong in a 10–1 loss. The result ensured Li would not be among the top 64 in the world rankings who keep their places on the snooker tour as he was ranked number 86 and so he played in Q School in an attempt to earn his place back. Li lost in the last 128 of the first event and the last 32 of the second to confirm his exit from the tour.

=== 2014/2015 season ===
Li entered the three Asian Tour events during the 2014/2015 season, but was knocked out in the first round of each. He again entered Q School, but could not win a match in either of the events, losing 4–3 to both Daniel Wells and Jamie Clarke.

=== 2015/2016 season ===
Li only played in the Haining Open and was eliminated 4–1 in the first round by John Higgins.

== Performance and rankings timeline ==
Tournament	2008/ 09	2009/ 10	2010/ 11	2011/ 12	2012/ 13	2013/ 14	2014/ 15	2016/ 17	2017/ 18	2018/ 19	2019/ 20
Ranking (Note: From the 2010/2011 season it shows the ranking at the beginning of the season.)	(Note: He was an amateur.)			(Note: New players on the Main Tour don't have a ranking.)	(Note: Players qualified through Players Tour Championship Order of Merit started the season without ranking points.)	84					
Ranking tournaments
International Championship	Tournament Not Held				LQ	1R	A	A	A	A	A
World Open (Note: The event was called the Grand Prix (2008/2009–2009/2010))	A	A	A	A	LQ	1R	NH	A	A	A	A
UK Championship	A	A	A	1R	LQ	1R	A	A	A	A	A
German Masters	Not Held		A	LQ	LQ	LQ	A	A	A	A	A
Welsh Open	A	A	A	LQ	LQ	1R	A	A	A	A	A
Players Championship (Note: The event was called the Players Tour Championship Grand Finals (2010/2011–2012/2013))	Not Held		A	DNQ	DNQ	DNQ	DNQ	DNQ	DNQ	DNQ	DNQ
China Open	A	WR	WR	LQ	LQ	LQ	A	A	A	A	A
World Championship	A	A	A	LQ	LQ	LQ	A	A	A	A	A
Non-ranking tournaments
Haining Open	Tournament Not Held						MR	1R	1R	1R	1R
Former ranking tournaments
Wuxi Classic (Note: The event ran under the name Jiangsu Classic (2008/2009–2009/2010))	Non-Ranking Event				LQ	LQ	A	Tournament Not Held			
Australian Goldfields Open	Not Held			LQ	LQ	LQ	A	Tournament Not Held			
Shanghai Masters	WR	1R	WR	LQ	LQ	LQ	A	A	A	Non-Ranking	
Indian Open	Tournament Not Held					2R	A	A	A	A	NH
Former non-ranking tournaments
Beijing International Challenge	NH	A	LQ	Tournament Not Held							
Hainan Classic	Not Held		RR	Tournament Not Held							
General Cup (Note: The event was called the General Cup International (2004/2005–2011/2012))	NH	SF	NH	A	A	A	A	Tournament Not Held			

Performance Table Legend
LQ	lost in the qualifying draw	#R	lost in the early rounds of the tournament (WR = Wildcard round, RR = Round robin)	QF	lost in the quarter-finals
SF	lost in the semi-finals	F	lost in the final	W	won the tournament
DNQ	did not qualify for the tournament	A	did not participate in the tournament	WD	withdrew from the tournament

NH / Not Held	means an event was not held.
NR / Non-Ranking Event	means an event is/was no longer a ranking event.
R / Ranking Event	means an event is/was a ranking event.
MR / Minor-Ranking Event	means an event is/was a minor-ranking event.
