= Beijing University Students' Gymnasium =

Sports venue in Beijing, China

Coordinates: 39.9686833°N 116.34907826°E

Beijing University Students Gymnasium (simplified Chinese: 北京大学生体育馆; traditional Chinese: 北京大學生體育館; pinyin: Běijīng Dàxuéshēng Tǐyùguǎn) is an indoor arena located in 11 N 3rd Ring Road W, Haidian District, Beijing, China. It is affiliated to the Capital Institute of Physical Education in Beijing, China. The gymnasium has a floor space of 12,000 square metres and 4,200 seats. The gymnasium was built in 1988 and hosted the basketball events of the 1990 Asian Games. Currently the stadium is hosting the annual snooker event of China Open.

It is necessary to point out that the Chinese name of Beijing University Students' Gymnasium (北京大学生体育馆) is only one character away from Peking University Gymnasium (北京大学体育馆), which are so similar that easily cause confusion by foreigners.
