= Players Tour Championship 2010/2011 – Event 4 =

Players Tour Championship 2010/2011 Event 4
Tournament information
- Dates: 14–16 August 2010
- Venue: World Snooker Academy
- City: Sheffield
- Country: England
- Organisation: World Snooker
- Format: Minor-ranking event
- Total prize fund: £50,000
- Winner's share: £10,000
- Highest break: Rory McLeod (ENG) (140)

Final
- Champion: Barry Pinches (ENG)
- Runner-up: Ronnie O'Sullivan (ENG)
- Score: 4–3

The Players Tour Championship 2010/2011 – Event 4 (also known as Star Xing Pai Players Tour Championship 2010/2011 – Event 4 for sponsorship purposes) was a professional minor-ranking snooker tournament that took place between 14 and 16 August 2010 at the World Snooker Academy in Sheffield, England. The preliminary rounds took place on 25 July at the same venue.

Barry Pinches won in the final 4–3 against Ronnie O'Sullivan.

== Prize fund and ranking points ==
The breakdown of prize money and ranking points of the event is shown below:

	Prize fund	Ranking points^{1}
Winner	£10,000	2,000
Runner-up	£5,000	1,600
Semi-finalist	£2,500	1,280
Quarter-finalist	£1,500	1,000
Last 16	£1,000	760
Last 32	£600	560
Last 64	£200	360
Total	£50,000	–

- ^{1} Only professional players can earn ranking points.

== Main draw ==
=== Preliminary rounds ===
==== Round 1 ====
Best of 7 frames

(Germany) Lasse Münstermann	2–4	(Wales) Jamie Clarke
(England) Michael Wild	4–1	(England) James Silverwood
(China) Chen Zhe	4–0	(England) Oliver Brown
(England) Shaun Wilkes	2–4	(England) Chris Norbury

(England) Rogelio Esteiro	0–4	(England) Robert Valiant
(England) David Portman	4–1	(England) Jamie Curtis-Barrett
(England) Paul Metcalf	3–4	(England) Lee Page
(England) Samuel Thistlewhite	w/o–w/d	(England) Mike Hallett

==== Round 2 ====
Best of 7 frames

(England) Andy Lee	1–4	(England) Jame McGouran
(England) Alex Davies	w/o–w/d	(England) Gareth Green
(England) David Craggs	2–4	(England) Farakh Ajaib
(England) David Grace	4–2	(England) Callum Downing
(England) Ian Burns	4–0	(England) Ashik Nathwani
(Belgium) Hans Blankaert	4–2	(Wales) Jamie Clarke
(England) Danny Douane	w/d–w/o	(England) Lee Spick
(England) Jamie Walker	4–1	(England) Lee Farebrother
(England) Antony Parsons	4–3	(England) Mitchell Travis
(England) John Whitty	1–4	(England) Steve Judd
(England) Lee Shanker	w/o–w/d	(Scotland) Dale Smith
(England) Dane Hall	w/d–w/o	(England) Michael Wild
(England) Stephen Ormerod	4–3	(Australia) Jamie Brown
(England) Nick Jennings	w/o–w/d	(England) Lewis Mayes
(China) Tian Pengfei	w/d–w/o	(England) Daniel Skingle
(England) Andrew Norman	3–4	(China) Chen Zhe

(China) Yu Delu	w/d–w/o	(England) Martin O'Donnell
(England) James Hill	0–4	(England) Chris Norbury
(England) Sam Baird	w/o–w/d	(India) Rupesh Thakkar
(England) David Gray	w/d–w/o	(Pakistan) Sharrukh Nasir
(England) Sam Craigie	w/d–w/o	(England) Rock Hui
(England) Joel Walker	4–0	(England) Anthony Robson
(England) Mark Smith	1–4	(England) Charlie Walters
(England) Jordan Rimmer	0–4	(England) Robert Valiant
(England) Stuart Carrington	w/o–w/d	(England) Marc Harman
(England) Kamran Ashraf	3–4	(England) David Portman
(England) Adam Duffy	4–0	(England) Craig Barber
(England) Tony Knowles	1–4	(England) Lee Page
(England) Ian Glover	4–3	(England) Jeff Cundy
(Wales) Alex Taubman	4–0	(England) Samuel Thistlewhite
(England) Shaun Parkes	3–4	(India) Lucky Vatnani
(England) Jake Nicholson	1–4	(England) Ben Harrison

=== Main rounds ===
==== Top half ====
===== Section 1 =====
Last 128; Best of 7 frames
(England) Mark Selby	4
(China) Zhang Anda	2
(England) Dave Harold	4
(England) James McGouran	1
(England) Ronnie O'Sullivan	4
(Wales) Ryan Day	0
(England) Stephen Craigie	2
(Republic of Ireland) Ken Doherty	4
(England) Mark King	w/d
(England) Alex Davies	w/o
(Scotland) Anthony McGill	4
(Scotland) Stephen Hendry	0
(Northern Ireland) Dermot McGlinchey	4
(England) Farakh Ajaib	2
(England) Judd Trump	4
(England) David Grace	1

Last 64; Best of 7 frames
(England) Mark Selby	4
(England) Dave Harold	1
(England) Ronnie O'Sullivan	4
(Republic of Ireland) Ken Doherty	1
(England) Alex Davies	1
(Scotland) Anthony McGill	4
(Northern Ireland) Dermot McGlinchey	0
(England) Judd Trump	4

Last 32; Best of 7 frames
(England) Mark Selby	0
(England) Ronnie O'Sullivan	4
(Scotland) Anthony McGill	0
(England) Judd Trump	4

Last 16; Best of 7 frames
(England) Ronnie O'Sullivan	4
(England) Judd Trump	0

===== Section 2 =====
Last 128; Best of 7 frames
(England) Ricky Walden	4
(England) David Gilbert	2
(Malta) Tony Drago	4
(Wales) Alex Taubman	1
(England) Joe Jogia	3
(England) Ian Burns	4
(England) Rory McLeod	4
(Republic of Ireland) Joe Delaney	0
(England) Justin Astley	4
(Belgium) Hans Blankaert	0
(Northern Ireland) Joe Swail	3
(Thailand) Issara Kachaiwong	4
(England) Martin Gould	4
(England) Ian McCulloch	2
(Hong Kong) Marco Fu	4
(England) Lee Spick	3

Last 64; Best of 7 frames
(England) Ricky Walden	2
(Malta) Tony Drago	4
(England) Ian Burns	4
(England) Rory McLeod	1
(England) Justin Astley	4
(Thailand) Issara Kachaiwong	3
(England) Martin Gould	1
(Hong Kong) Marco Fu	4

Last 32; Best of 7 frames
(Malta) Tony Drago	4
(England) Ian Burns	3
(England) Justin Astley	3
(Hong Kong) Marco Fu	4

Last 16; Best of 7 frames
(Malta) Tony Drago	2
(Hong Kong) Marco Fu	4

===== Section 3 =====
Last 128; Best of 7 frames
(England) Allan Taylor	4
(England) Reanne Evans	1
(England) Nigel Bond	2
(England) Jamie Walker	4
(Brazil) Igor Figueiredo	4
(England) Antony Parsons	3
(Belgium) Bjorn Haneveer	4
(England) Steve Judd	1
(Wales) Dominic Dale	4
(England) Simon Bedford	0
(England) Mark Joyce	4
(Northern Ireland) Patrick Wallace	2
(England) Liam Highfield	4
(England) Lee Shanker	1
(England) Alfie Burden	4
(England) Michael Wild	0

Last 64; Best of 7 frames
(England) Allan Taylor	2
(England) Jamie Walker	4
(Brazil) Igor Figueiredo	3
(Belgium) Bjorn Haneveer	4
(Wales) Dominic Dale	4
(England) Mark Joyce	0
(England) Liam Highfield	1
(England) Alfie Burden	4

Last 32; Best of 7 frames
(England) Jamie Walker	1
(Belgium) Bjorn Haneveer	4
(Wales) Dominic Dale	4
(England) Alfie Burden	3

Last 16; Best of 7 frames
(Belgium) Bjorn Haneveer	1
(Wales) Dominic Dale	4

===== Section 4 =====
Last 128; Best of 7 frames
(China) Xiao Guodong	4
(Wales) Michael White	2
(England) Kuldesh Johal	3
(Republic of Ireland) Michael Judge	4
(England) Peter Lines	4
(England) Kyren Wilson	0
(England) Adrian Gunnell	4
(England) Stephen Ormerod	2
(England) Michael Wasley	2
(England) Jack Lisowski	4
(England) Mark Davis	4
(Germany) Patrick Einsle	0
(Scotland) Stephen Maguire	4
(England) Nick Jennings	0
(England) Jamie Cope	4
(England) Daniel Skingle	1

Last 64; Best of 7 frames
(China) Xiao Guodong	4
(Republic of Ireland) Michael Judge	1
(England) Peter Lines	4
(England) Adrian Gunnell	2
(England) Jack Lisowski	0
(England) Mark Davis	4
(Scotland) Stephen Maguire	4
(England) Jamie Cope	1

Last 32; Best of 7 frames
(China) Xiao Guodong	2
(England) Peter Lines	4
(England) Mark Davis	3
(Scotland) Stephen Maguire	4

Last 16; Best of 7 frames
(England) Peter Lines	0
(Scotland) Stephen Maguire	4

==== Bottom half ====
===== Section 5 =====
Last 128; Best of 7 frames
(England) Barry Pinches	4
(Thailand) Thanawat Thirapongpaiboon	0
(England) Stuart Bingham	3
(China) Chen Zhe	4
(England) Matthew Couch	1
(England) Anthony Hamilton	4
(England) Paul Davison	2
(Wales) Jak Jones	4
(England) Tom Ford	3
(England) Martin O'Donnell	4
(England) Ben Woollaston	3
(England) Chris Norbury	4
(England) Matthew Selt	4
(Wales) Paul Davies	3
(England) Shaun Murphy	4
(England) Michael Holt	3

Last 64; Best of 7 frames
(England) Barry Pinches	4
(China) Chen Zhe	2
(England) Anthony Hamilton	3
(Wales) Jak Jones	4
(England) Martin O'Donnell	1
(England) Chris Norbury	4
(England) Matthew Selt	4
(England) Shaun Murphy	3

Last 32; Best of 7 frames
(England) Barry Pinches	4
(Wales) Jak Jones	0
(England) Chris Norbury	2
(England) Matthew Selt	4

Last 16; Best of 7 frames
(England) Barry Pinches	4
(England) Matthew Selt	1

===== Section 6 =====
Last 128; Best of 7 frames
(China) Liu Song	4
(England) Sam Baird	3
(England) Andy Hicks	4
(Scotland) James McBain	2
(England) Peter Ebdon	4
(Republic of Ireland) David Morris	3
(Northern Ireland) Gerard Greene	4
(Thailand) Noppon Saengkham	1
(England) Jimmy White^{[a]}	w/d
(Pakistan) Sharrukh Nasir	w/o
(England) Jimmy Robertson	4
(England) Rock Hui	0
(China) Liu Chuang	3
(England) Joel Walker	4
(Norway) Kurt Maflin	1
(England) Robert Milkins	4

Last 64; Best of 7 frames
(China) Liu Song	4
(England) Andy Hicks	2
(England) Peter Ebdon	1
(Northern Ireland) Gerard Greene	4
(Pakistan) Sharrukh Nasir	1
(England) Jimmy Robertson	4
(England) Joel Walker	0
(England) Robert Milkins	4

Last 32; Best of 7 frames
(China) Liu Song	4
(Northern Ireland) Gerard Greene	1
(England) Jimmy Robertson	4
(England) Robert Milkins	3

Last 16; Best of 7 frames
(China) Liu Song	4
(England) Jimmy Robertson	3

===== Section 7 =====
Last 128; Best of 7 frames
(Wales) Jamie Jones	2
(Northern Ireland) Mark Allen	4
(England) Stephen Lee	w/o
(England) Charlie Walters	w/d
(England) Joe Perry	4
(England) Robert Valiant	3
(Wales) Andrew Pagett	1
(England) Stuart Carrington	4
(Scotland) Alan McManus	4
(China) Liang Wenbo	3
(Republic of Ireland) Fergal O'Brien	4
(England) David Portman	2
(England) Mike Dunn	4
(England) Stuart Pettman	3
(Wales) Matthew Stevens	4
(Thailand) James Wattana	1

Last 64; Best of 7 frames
(Northern Ireland) Mark Allen	3
(England) Stephen Lee	4
(England) Joe Perry	4
(England) Stuart Carrington	3
(Scotland) Alan McManus	4
(Republic of Ireland) Fergal O'Brien	3
(England) Mike Dunn	3
(Wales) Matthew Stevens	4

Last 32; Best of 7 frames
(England) Stephen Lee	4
(England) Joe Perry	1
(Scotland) Alan McManus	0
(Wales) Matthew Stevens	4

Last 16; Best of 7 frames
(England) Stephen Lee	1
(Wales) Matthew Stevens	4

===== Section 8 =====
Last 128; Best of 7 frames
(England) Barry Hawkins	4
(England) Adam Duffy	1
(England) Jimmy Michie	0
(England) Lee Page	4
(Scotland) Graeme Dott	3
(England) Adam Wicheard	4
(Scotland) Marcus Campbell	3
(England) Ian Glover	4
(Wales) Daniel Wells	4
(Australia) Neil Robertson	3
(England) Andrew Higginson	4
(India) Lucky Vatnani	1
(England) Jamie O'Neill	4
(England) Rod Lawler	3
(Wales) Mark Williams	4
(England) Ben Harrison	1

Last 64; Best of 7 frames
(England) Barry Hawkins	4
(England) Lee Page	2
(England) Adam Wicheard	0
(England) Ian Glover	4
(Wales) Daniel Wells	3
(England) Andrew Higginson	4
(England) Jamie O'Neill	3
(Wales) Mark Williams	4

Last 32; Best of 7 frames
(England) Barry Hawkins	4
(England) Ian Glover	1
(England) Andrew Higginson	2
(Wales) Mark Williams	4

Last 16; Best of 7 frames
(England) Barry Hawkins	1
(Wales) Mark Williams	4

==== Finals ====
Quarter-finals; Best of 7 frames		Semi-finals; Best of 7 frames		Final; Best of 7 frames
(England) Ronnie O'Sullivan	4
(Hong Kong) Marco Fu	0	(England) Ronnie O'Sullivan	4
(Wales) Dominic Dale	4	(Wales) Dominic Dale	3
(Scotland) Stephen Maguire	0			(England) Ronnie O'Sullivan	3
(England) Barry Pinches	4			(England) Barry Pinches	4
(China) Liu Song	2	(England) Barry Pinches	4
(Wales) Matthew Stevens	1	(Wales) Mark Williams	1
(Wales) Mark Williams	4

== Final ==
Final: Best of 7 frames. World Snooker Academy, Sheffield, England, 16 August 2010.
Ronnie O'Sullivan; England	3–4	Barry Pinches; England
107–1 (60), 1–76, 83–0 (83), 85–31 (58), 0–65, 47–57, 0–64 (64)
83	Highest break	64
0	Century breaks	0
3	50+ breaks	1

== Century breaks ==
- 140 – Rory McLeod
- 137, 109, 104 – Marco Fu
- 136, 116, 113, 108 – Ronnie O'Sullivan
- 135 – Joe Perry
- 134, 105 – Barry Pinches
- 129, 124 – Andy Hicks
- 129 – Mark Selby
- 128, 125 – Liu Song
- 124, 109 – Matthew Stevens
- 124, 107 – Mark Davis
- 121 – Stuart Pettman
- 119 – Gerard Greene
- 116 – Barry Hawkins
- 113, 111 – Tony Drago
- 113 – Jamie Walker
- 110, 105 – Alfie Burden
- 109 – Michael Holt
- 108 – Daniel Wells
- 107 – David Gilbert
- 106 – Dominic Dale
- 104 – Graeme Dott
- 103 – Chris Norbury
- 102 – Ian Glover
- 102 – Stephen Maguire
- 102 – Stephen Lee
- 101 – Xiao Guodong
- 100 – Jamie O'Neill
- 100 – Matthew Selt
- 100 – Robert Milkins

== Notes ==
- ^{a} Jimmy White withdrew due to ill health.
