= Players Tour Championship 2012/2013 – Event 1 =

Players Tour Championship 2012/2013 Event 1
Tournament information
- Dates: 18–22 July 2012
- Venue: South West Snooker Academy
- City: Gloucester
- Country: England
- Organisation: World Snooker
- Format: Minor-ranking event
- Total prize fund: £50,000
- Winner's share: £10,000
- Highest break: Ali Carter (ENG) (141)

Final
- Champion: Stephen Maguire (SCO)
- Runner-up: Jack Lisowski (ENG)
- Score: 4–3

The Players Tour Championship 2012/2013 – Event 1 was a professional minor-ranking snooker tournament that took place between 18 and 22 July 2012 at the South West Snooker Academy in Gloucester, England.

Stephen Maguire won his eighth professional title by defeating Jack Lisowski 4–3 in the final.

== Prize fund and ranking points ==
The breakdown of prize money and ranking points of the event is shown below:

| | Prize fund | Ranking points^{1} |
|---|---|---|
| Winner | £10,000 | 2,000 |
| Runner-up | £5,000 | 1,600 |
| Semi-finalist | £2,500 | 1,280 |
| Quarter-finalist | £1,500 | 1,000 |
| Last 16 | £1,000 | 760 |
| Last 32 | £600 | 560 |
| Last 64 | £200 | 360 |
| Total | £50,000 | – |

- ^{1} Only professional players can earn ranking points.

== Main draw ==
=== Preliminary rounds ===
==== Round 1 ====
Best of 7 frames

| (England) Adam Bobat | 2–4 | (Wales) Alex Taubman |
| (England) Ronnie Kralj | 0–4 | (England) Reanne Evans |
| (China) Long Wang | 1–4 | (England) Thomas Wealthy |
| (England) Robert Tickner | 1–4 | (Belgium) Hans Blanckaert |
| (England) Alex Davies | 0–4 | (England) Gary Wilson |
| (England) Allan Taylor | 4–2 | (England) Kyren Wilson |

| (England) Ian Brumby | 4–2 | (England) Harvey Chandler |
| (England) Andrew Milliard | 4–1 | (England) Brandon Sargeant |
| (England) James Gillespie | 4–0 | (England) Danny Brindle |
| (Scotland) Lloyd Condron | 2–4 | (England) Steven Hallworth |
| (England) George Marter | 3–4 | (England) Darrell Whitworth |
| (Wales) Jack Bradford | 0–4 | (England) Ricky Norris |

==== Round 2 ====
Best of 7 frames

| (England) Richard Remelie | 2–4 | (India) Lucky Vatnani |
| (England) Callum Downing | 4–1 | (Wales) Alex Taubman |
| (England) Greg Davis | 0–4 | (England) Sydney Wilson |
| (England) Sam Harvey | 1–4 | (England) John Astley |
| (England) Jamie Gibson | 0–4 | (England) Reanne Evans |
| (England) Kevin Ellis | 0–4 | (England) Michael Wild |
| (England) Tahir Miah | 0–4 | (England) Tom Maxfield |
| (England) Phil O'Kane | 4–0 | (England) Thomas Wealthy |
| (England) Shane Castle | 4–3 | (Belgium) Hans Blanckaert |
| (England) Ian Glover | 4–1 | (England) Jeff Cundy |
| (Scotland) Marc Davis | 2–4 | (England) Stuart Carrington |
| (England) Jake Spiezick | 1–4 | (England) Billy Joe Castle |
| (England) Toby Simpson | 4–2 | (England) Ben Fortey |
| (England) Ben Harrison | 4–3 | (Wales) Duane Jones |
| (England) Martin Ball | 0–4 | (Wales) Andrew Pagett |
| (England) Lewis Frampton | 0–4 | (England) Lee Page |
| (England) Christopher Keogan | 0–4 | (England) Gary Wilson |
| (England) Anthony Harris | 3–4 | (England) Saqib Nasir |
| (Scotland) Eden Sharav | 4–2 | (England) Matthew Day |

| (England) Craig Barber | 4–3 | (Republic of Ireland) John Sutton |
| (Northern Ireland) Jordan Brown | 4–1 | (England) Liam Monk |
| (Republic of Ireland) Dessie Sheehan | 1–4 | (England) Allan Taylor |
| (England) Ryan Causton | 4–0 | (Scotland) Ross Higgins |
| (Northern Ireland) Billy Brown | 0–4 | (England) Ian Brumby |
| (Scotland) Fraser Patrick | 4–1 | (Brazil) Itaro Santos |
| (Wales) Gavin Lewis | 2–4 | (Wales) Gareth Allen |
| (Wales) Jak Jones | 4–2 | (England) Andrew Milliard |
| (England) James Gibson | 2–4 | (England) James Gillespie |
| (England) Zak Surety | 4–0 | (England) Steven Hallworth |
| (Wales) Callum Lloyd | 4–1 | (Northern Ireland) Paul Ludden |
| (England) Matthew Couch | 4–3 | (England) Steve Ventham |
| (Wales) Ben Jones | 1–4 | (England) Andrew Norman |
| (Isle of Man) Darryl Hill | 4–1 | (England) Darrell Whitworth |
| (Poland) Kacper Filipiak | 1–4 | (Northern Ireland) Joe Swail |
| (England) Sachin Plaha | 1–4 | (England) Nick Jennings |
| (England) Chris Norbury | 2–4 | (England) James Cahill |
| (England) Elliot Slessor | 4–1 | (England) Ricky Norris |
| (England) Oliver Brown | 3–4 | (England) Gareth Green |

=== Main rounds ===
==== Top half ====
===== Section 1 =====
Last 128; Best of 7 frames
(England) Mark Selby | 4
(India) Lucky Vatnani | 0
(England) Rory McLeod | 4
(England) Callum Downing | 2
(England) Dave Harold | 4
(Wales) Daniel Wells | 2
(Northern Ireland) Gerard Greene | 2
(England) Sydney Wilson | 4
(Norway) Kurt Maflin | 0
(England) Joel Walker | 4
(England) Andrew Higginson | 4
(England) John Astley | 3
(England) Jamie Cope | 4
(England) Reanne Evans | 3
(England) Anthony Hamilton | 4
(England) Michael Wild | 2

Last 64; Best of 7 frames
(England) Mark Selby | 4
(England) Rory McLeod | 2
(England) Dave Harold | 4
(England) Sydney Wilson | 3
(England) Joel Walker | 0
(England) Andrew Higginson | 4
(England) Jamie Cope | 4
(England) Anthony Hamilton | 1

Last 32; Best of 7 frames
(England) Mark Selby | 2
(England) Dave Harold | 4
(England) Andrew Higginson | 4
(England) Jamie Cope | 2

Last 16; Best of 7 frames
(England) Dave Harold | 0
(England) Andrew Higginson | 4

===== Section 2 =====
Last 128; Best of 7 frames
(Wales) Michael White | 4
(England) Tom Maxfield | 2
(Scotland) Alan McManus | 4
(China) Chen Zhe | 0
(Wales) Dominic Dale | 4
(England) Martin O'Donnell | 1
(England) Peter Lines | 4
(England) Phil O'Kane | 0
(Thailand) Dechawat Poomjaeng | 4
(Thailand) Thepchaiya Un-Nooh | 1
(England) Jimmy Robertson | 4
(Scotland) Michael Leslie | 2
(Scotland) Anthony McGill | 4
(England) Jamie O'Neill | 2
(China) Xiao Guodong | 4
(England) Shane Castle | 0

Last 64; Best of 7 frames
(Wales) Michael White | 0
(Scotland) Alan McManus | 4
(Wales) Dominic Dale | 4
(England) Peter Lines | 3
(Thailand) Dechawat Poomjaeng | 4
(England) Jimmy Robertson | 0
(Scotland) Anthony McGill | 3
(China) Xiao Guodong | 4

Last 32; Best of 7 frames
(Scotland) Alan McManus | 4
(Wales) Dominic Dale | 3
(Thailand) Dechawat Poomjaeng | 4
(China) Xiao Guodong | 2

Last 16; Best of 7 frames
(Scotland) Alan McManus | 4
(Thailand) Dechawat Poomjaeng | 0

===== Section 3 =====
Last 128; Best of 7 frames
(England) Ricky Walden | 4
(England) Ian Glover | 0
(England) Barry Hawkins | 4
(England) Stuart Carrington | 2
(England) Nigel Bond | 1
(India) Pankaj Advani | 4
(England) Michael Holt | 4
(England) Billy Joe Castle | 1
(Thailand) James Wattana | 4
(England) Michael Wasley | 0
(England) Shaun Murphy | w/o
(Egypt) Mohamed Khairy | w/d
(England) Andy Hicks | 4
(England) Toby Simpson | 0
(England) Barry Pinches | 3
(Thailand) Thanawat Thirapongpaiboon | 4

Last 64; Best of 7 frames
(England) Ricky Walden | 2
(England) Barry Hawkins | 4
(India) Pankaj Advani | 0
(England) Michael Holt | 4
(Thailand) James Wattana | 4
(England) Shaun Murphy | 2
(England) Andy Hicks | 4
(Thailand) Thanawat Thirapongpaiboon | 3

Last 32; Best of 7 frames
(England) Barry Hawkins | 4
(England) Michael Holt | 2
(Thailand) James Wattana | 4
(England) Andy Hicks | 2

Last 16; Best of 7 frames
(England) Barry Hawkins | 4
(Thailand) James Wattana | 1

===== Section 4 =====
Last 128; Best of 7 frames
(England) Robert Milkins | 4
(Australia) Ben Judge | 2
(England) Mark Joyce | 4
(England) Ben Harrison | 1
(Thailand) Passakorn Suwannawat | 2
(Wales) Andrew Pagett | 4
(China) Yu Delu | 4
(England) Lee Page | 2
(Hong Kong) Marco Fu | 1
(England) Gary Wilson | 4
(China) Liu Chuang | 4
(England) Saqib Nasir | 2
(Scotland) Stephen Maguire | 4
(Scotland) Eden Sharav | 0
(England) Adam Duffy | 2
(England) Paul Davison | 4

Last 64; Best of 7 frames
(England) Robert Milkins | 0
(England) Mark Joyce | 4
(Wales) Andrew Pagett | 4
(China) Yu Delu | 2
(England) Gary Wilson | 4
(China) Liu Chuang | 0
(Scotland) Stephen Maguire | 4
(England) Paul Davison | 1

Last 32; Best of 7 frames
(England) Mark Joyce | 0
(Wales) Andrew Pagett | 4
(England) Gary Wilson | 0
(Scotland) Stephen Maguire | 4

Last 16; Best of 7 frames
(Wales) Andrew Pagett | 2
(Scotland) Stephen Maguire | 4

==== Bottom half ====
===== Section 5 =====
Last 128; Best of 7 frames
(Wales) Mark Williams | 4
(India) Aditya Mehta | 2
(England) Stephen Lee | 4
(England) Craig Barber | 0
(Wales) Jamie Jones | 2
(Northern Ireland) Jordan Brown | 4
(England) Peter Ebdon | 1
(England) Rod Lawler | 4
(England) David Gilbert | 2
(England) Robbie Williams | 4
(Republic of Ireland) Fergal O'Brien | w/o
(Canada) Floyd Ziegler | w/d
(England) Mark Davis | 2
(England) Allan Taylor | 4
(England) Simon Bedford | 2
(England) Ryan Causton | 4

Last 64; Best of 7 frames
(Wales) Mark Williams | 4
(England) Stephen Lee | 2
(Northern Ireland) Jordan Brown | 2
(England) Rod Lawler | 4
(England) Robbie Williams | 4
(Republic of Ireland) Fergal O'Brien | 3
(England) Allan Taylor | 4
(England) Ryan Causton | 1

Last 32; Best of 7 frames
(Wales) Mark Williams | 4
(England) Rod Lawler | 3
(England) Robbie Williams | 0
(England) Allan Taylor | 4

Last 16; Best of 7 frames
(Wales) Mark Williams | 4
(England) Allan Taylor | 0

===== Section 6 =====
Last 128; Best of 7 frames
(England) Steve Davis | 4
(China) Zhang Anda | 2
(England) Mike Dunn | 2
(England) Sam Baird | 4
(England) Ali Carter | 4
(England) Ian Brumby | 0
(China) Liang Wenbo | 4
(China) Tian Pengfei | 1
(England) Liam Highfield | 2
(Scotland) Scott Donaldson | 4
(Scotland) Jamie Burnett | 4
(Scotland) Fraser Patrick | 3
(Wales) Ryan Day | 4
(England) Sean O'Sullivan | 1
(England) Matthew Selt | 1
(England) Ian Burns | 4

Last 64; Best of 7 frames
(England) Steve Davis | 4
(England) Sam Baird | 0
(England) Ali Carter | 4
(China) Liang Wenbo | 2
(Scotland) Scott Donaldson | 2
(Scotland) Jamie Burnett | 4
(Wales) Ryan Day | 4
(England) Ian Burns | 1

Last 32; Best of 7 frames
(England) Steve Davis | 1
(England) Ali Carter | 4
(Scotland) Jamie Burnett | 4
(Wales) Ryan Day | 2

Last 16; Best of 7 frames
(England) Ali Carter | 4
(Scotland) Jamie Burnett | 0

===== Section 7 =====
Last 128; Best of 7 frames
(England) Alfie Burden | 2
(Wales) Gareth Allen | 4
(England) Martin Gould | 2
(Wales) Jak Jones | 4
(England) David Grace | 4
(England) James Gillespie | 1
(England) Jimmy White | 4
(Malta) Tony Drago | 3
(England) Jack Lisowski | 4
(England) Zak Surety | 0
(China) Li Yan | 4
(Wales) Callum Lloyd | 2
(England) Stuart Bingham | 1
(China) Cao Yupeng | 4
(England) Mark King | 0
(England) Matthew Couch | 4

Last 64; Best of 7 frames
(Wales) Gareth Allen | 4
(Wales) Jak Jones | 2
(England) David Grace | 4
(England) Jimmy White | 2
(England) Jack Lisowski | 4
(China) Li Yan | 3
(China) Cao Yupeng | 2
(England) Matthew Couch | 4

Last 32; Best of 7 frames
(Wales) Gareth Allen | 0
(England) David Grace | 4
(England) Jack Lisowski | 4
(England) Matthew Couch | 1

Last 16; Best of 7 frames
(England) David Grace | 1
(England) Jack Lisowski | 4

===== Section 8 =====
Last 128; Best of 7 frames
(England) Tom Ford | 2
(England) Andrew Norman | 4
(England) Joe Perry | 4
(Isle of Man) Darryl Hill | 0
(Scotland) Graeme Dott | 2
(Belgium) Luca Brecel | 4
(Republic of Ireland) Ken Doherty | 4
(Northern Ireland) Joe Swail | 1
(England) Craig Steadman | 4
(England) Nick Jennings | 2
(England) Ben Woollaston | 4
(England) James Cahill | 1
(Scotland) Marcus Campbell | 4
(England) Elliot Slessor | 3
(England) Judd Trump | 4
(England) Gareth Green | 0

Last 64; Best of 7 frames
(England) Andrew Norman | 3
(England) Joe Perry | 4
(Belgium) Luca Brecel | 4
(Republic of Ireland) Ken Doherty | 3
(England) Craig Steadman | 4
(England) Ben Woollaston | 3
(Scotland) Marcus Campbell | 1
(England) Judd Trump | 4

Last 32; Best of 7 frames
(England) Joe Perry | 3
(Belgium) Luca Brecel | 4
(England) Craig Steadman | 2
(England) Judd Trump | 4

Last 16; Best of 7 frames
(Belgium) Luca Brecel | 1
(England) Judd Trump | 4

==== Finals ====
Quarter-finals; Best of 7 frames
1 | (England) Andrew Higginson | 4
8 | (Scotland) Alan McManus | 3
4 | (England) Barry Hawkins | 3
5 | (Scotland) Stephen Maguire | 4
2 | (Wales) Mark Williams | 4
7 | (England) Ali Carter | 3
3 | (England) Jack Lisowski | 4
6 | (England) Judd Trump | 3

Semi-finals; Best of 7 frames
(England) Andrew Higginson | 1
(Scotland) Stephen Maguire | 4
(Wales) Mark Williams | 3
(England) Jack Lisowski | 4

Final; Best of 7 frames
(Scotland) Stephen Maguire | 4
(England) Jack Lisowski | 3

== Century breaks ==
- 141 – Ali Carter
- 138 – Marco Fu
- 136 – Paul Davison
- 135 – Tom Maxfield
- 133, 110 – Luca Brecel
- 131 – Sam Baird
- 129, 105 – Cao Yupeng
- 128 – Jack Lisowski
- 125, 122 – Stephen Maguire
- 125 – John Astley
- 124, 117 – Barry Hawkins
- 124 – Alex Taubman
- 124 – Craig Steadman
- 123, 105, 100 – Joe Perry
- 121 – Chris Norbury
- 119, 117 – Xiao Guodong
- 118 – Jamie Burnett
- 114, 109 – Judd Trump
- 111 – Aditya Mehta
- 109 – Yu Delu
- 105 – Anthony McGill
- 103 – James Wattana
- 103 – Liu Chuang
- 102 – Lee Page
- 102 – Jamie Cope
- 101, 101 – Andrew Norman
- 101 – Michael Holt
- 101 – Rod Lawler
- 100 – Ben Woollaston
