= Players Tour Championship 2010/2011 – Event 3 =

Players Tour Championship 2010/2011 Event 3
Tournament information
- Dates: 6–8 August 2010
- Venue: World Snooker Academy
- City: Sheffield
- Country: England
- Organisation: World Snooker
- Format: Minor-ranking event
- Total prize fund: £50,000
- Winner's share: £10,000
- Highest break: Barry Hawkins (ENG) (147)

Final
- Champion: Tom Ford (ENG)
- Runner-up: Jack Lisowski (ENG)
- Score: 4–0

The Players Tour Championship 2010/2011 – Event 3 (also known as Star Xing Pai Players Tour Championship 2010/2011 – Event 3 for sponsorship purposes) was a professional minor-ranking snooker tournament that took place between 6–8 August 2010 at the World Snooker Academy in Sheffield, England. The preliminary rounds took place on 24 July at the same venue.

Barry Hawkins made the 72nd official maximum break during his last 32 match against James McGouran. This was Hawkins' first official 147.

Tom Ford won his first professional title by defeating Jack Lisowski 4–0 in the final.

== Prize fund and ranking points ==
The breakdown of prize money and ranking points of the event is shown below:

	Prize fund	Ranking points^{1}
Winner	£10,000	2,000
Runner-up	£5,000	1,600
Semi-finalist	£2,500	1,280
Quarter-finalist	£1,500	1,000
Last 16	£1,000	760
Last 32	£600	560
Last 64	£200	360
Total	£50,000	–

- ^{1} Only professional players can earn ranking points.

== Main draw ==
=== Preliminary rounds ===
==== Round 1 ====
Best of 7 frames

(England) Gareth Green	3–4	(England) Robert Valiant
(England) David Gray	w/d–w/o	(England) Lee Page
(England) Sam Baird	4–0	(England) Jim Buck

(China) Chen Zhe	4–1	(England) Oliver Brown
(England) Samuel Thistlewhite	4–0	(England) Stephen Ormerod

==== Round 2 ====
Best of 7 frames

(England) Rogelio Esteiro	1–4	(England) Callum Downing
(England) David Portman	4–0	(England) Terry Challenger
(England) Shaun Parkes	1–4	(England) Mitchell Travis
(Germany) Lasse Münstermann	0–4	(England) Robert Valiant
(England) Damian Wilks	4–2	(Australia) Jamie Brown
(England) Jamie Curtis-Barrett	3–4	(England) Lee Spick
(England) Michael Wild	4–1	(England) Jake Nicholson
(England) Tony Knowles	1–4	(England) Chris Norbury
(England) Kamran Ashraf	3–4	(England) Stuart Carrington
(England) Jordan Rimmer	3–4	(England) Farakh Ajaib
(Thailand) Thepchaiya Un-Nooh	w/d–w/o	(Pakistan) Sharrukh Nasir
(England) James Hill	1–4	(England) Lee Farebrother
(England) Robbie Williams	4–1	(England) Shaun Wilkes
(England) Craig Barber	4–1	(Wales) Callum Lloyd
(Belgium) Luca Brecel	2–4	(England) Adam Duffy
(England) Rock Hui	2–4	(England) Daniel Skingle

(England) Antony Parsons	4–2	(England) Joel Walker
(England) Lewis Mayes	w/d–w/o	(England) Andrew Norman
(England) Lee Shanker	0–4	(England) Lee Page
(England) Greg Davis	w/o–w/d	(England) Craig Steadman
(Wales) Alex Taubman	1–4	(England) Steve Judd
(England) Alex Davies	2–4	(England) Sam Baird
(India) Aditya Mehta	w/d–w/o	(England) Marc Harman
(England) Martin O'Donnell	4–3	(England) Paul Metcalf
(England) Danny Douane	w/d–w/o	(England) Ian Burns
(England) Jamie Walker	4–3	(England) David Grace
(England) Neal Jones	w/d–w/o	(England) Charlie Walters
(Northern Ireland) Raymond Fry	2–4	(China) Chen Zhe
(England) Nick Pearce	w/d–w/o	(England) Andy Lee
(England) Jeff Cundy	w/o–w/d	(Thailand) Suriya Suwannasingh
(India) Lucky Vatnani	1–4	(England) Samuel Thistlewhite
(England) Ian Glover	4–1	(Belgium) Hans Blankaert

=== Main rounds ===
==== Top half ====
===== Section 1 =====
Last 128; Best of 7 frames
(England) Mark Selby	4
(Thailand) Noppon Saengkham	0
(Scotland) Graeme Dott	4
(England) Callum Downing	0
(England) Justin Astley	1
(Wales) Ryan Day	4
(Wales) Daniel Wells	4
(England) David Portman	2
(England) Paul Davison	3
(England) Mitchell Travis	4
(England) Judd Trump	4
(England) Michael Holt	1
(Belgium) Bjorn Haneveer	0
(Wales) Michael White	4
(China) Liu Chuang	4
(England) Robert Valiant	3

Last 64; Best of 7 frames
(England) Mark Selby	4
(Scotland) Graeme Dott	0
(Wales) Ryan Day	4
(Wales) Daniel Wells	3
(England) Mitchell Travis	2
(England) Judd Trump	4
(Wales) Michael White	4
(China) Liu Chuang	2

Last 32; Best of 7 frames
(England) Mark Selby	4
(Wales) Ryan Day	1
(England) Judd Trump	4
(Wales) Michael White	3

Last 16; Best of 7 frames
(England) Mark Selby	4
(England) Judd Trump	3

===== Section 2 =====
Last 128; Best of 7 frames
(Norway) Kurt Maflin	4
(England) Steve Davis	2
(England) Jame McGouran	4
(Wales) Paul Davies	0
(Wales) Matthew Stevens	4
(England) Damian Wilks	0
(England) Barry Hawkins	4
(England) Lee Spick	1
(Brazil) Igor Figueiredo	4
(Republic of Ireland) Joe Delaney	1
(England) Ben Harrison	4
(Thailand) Thanawat Thirapongpaiboon	1
(England) Peter Ebdon	4
(England) Jamie O'Neill	2
(England) Jimmy Robertson	3
(Germany) Patrick Einsle	4

Last 64; Best of 7 frames
(Norway) Kurt Maflin	1
(England) Jame McGouran	4
(Wales) Matthew Stevens	2
(England) Barry Hawkins	4
(Brazil) Igor Figueiredo	4
(England) Ben Harrison	3
(England) Peter Ebdon	2
(Germany) Patrick Einsle	4

Last 32; Best of 7 frames
(England) Jame McGouran	1
(England) Barry Hawkins	4
(Brazil) Igor Figueiredo	4
(Germany) Patrick Einsle	1

Last 16; Best of 7 frames
(England) Barry Hawkins	4
(Brazil) Igor Figueiredo	3

===== Section 3 =====
Last 128; Best of 7 frames
(England) Mark King	4
(England) Michael Wild	1
(Northern Ireland) Dermot McGlinchey	0
(England) Joe Perry	4
(England) Matthew Selt	4
(England) Chris Norbury	1
(Thailand) James Wattana	4
(England) David Gilbert	2
(England) Martin Gould	4
(Republic of Ireland) Michael Judge	1
(Scotland) Alan McManus	3
(England) Stuart Carrington	4
(England) Ben Woollaston	4
(England) Farakh Ajaib	0
(England) Jimmy Michie	2
(England) Jack Lisowski	4

Last 64; Best of 7 frames
(England) Mark King	2
(England) Joe Perry	4
(England) Matthew Selt	4
(Thailand) James Wattana	2
(England) Martin Gould	2
(England) Stuart Carrington	4
(England) Ben Woollaston	0
(England) Jack Lisowski	4

Last 32; Best of 7 frames
(England) Joe Perry	3
(England) Matthew Selt	4
(England) Stuart Carrington	3
(England) Jack Lisowski	4

Last 16; Best of 7 frames
(England) Matthew Selt	2
(England) Jack Lisowski	4

===== Section 4 =====
Last 128; Best of 7 frames
(England) Jimmy White	4
(Pakistan) Sharrukh Nasir	0
(Malta) Tony Drago	4
(England) Lee Farebrother	0
(Wales) Jamie Jones	1
(England) Ian McCulloch	4
(England) Ricky Walden	2
(England) Robbie Williams	4
(China) Liu Song	2
(England) Kyren Wilson	4
(England) Mike Dunn	3
(China) Liang Wenbo	4
(Scotland) Stephen Maguire	4
(England) Craig Barber	1
(England) Nigel Bond	4
(England) Adam Duffy	2

Last 64; Best of 7 frames
(England) Jimmy White	3
(Malta) Tony Drago	4
(England) Ian McCulloch	4
(England) Robbie Williams	1
(England) Kyren Wilson	0
(China) Liang Wenbo	4
(Scotland) Stephen Maguire	0
(England) Nigel Bond	4

Last 32; Best of 7 frames
(Malta) Tony Drago	2
(England) Ian McCulloch	4
(China) Liang Wenbo	4
(England) Nigel Bond	3

Last 16; Best of 7 frames
(England) Ian McCulloch	4
(China) Liang Wenbo	2

==== Bottom half ====
===== Section 5 =====
Last 128; Best of 7 frames
(England) Barry Pinches	4
(England) Daniel Skingle	1
(Republic of Ireland) Fergal O'Brien	4
(England) Antony Parsons	3
(Wales) Dominic Dale	4
(England) Simon Bedford	0
(England) Allan Taylor	0
(Australia) Neil Robertson	4
(England) Stuart Bingham	4
(England) Andrew Norman	2
(England) Kuldesh Johal	2
(Scotland) James McBain	4
(China) Xiao Guodong	4
(England) Lee Page	0
(England) Andy Hicks	4
(England) Greg Davis	1

Last 64; Best of 7 frames
(England) Barry Pinches	4
(Republic of Ireland) Fergal O'Brien	3
(Wales) Dominic Dale	4
(Australia) Neil Robertson	2
(England) Stuart Bingham	3
(Scotland) James McBain	4
(China) Xiao Guodong	0
(England) Andy Hicks	4

Last 32; Best of 7 frames
(England) Barry Pinches	3
(Wales) Dominic Dale	4
(Scotland) James McBain	3
(England) Andy Hicks	4

Last 16; Best of 7 frames
(Wales) Dominic Dale	2
(England) Andy Hicks	4

===== Section 6 =====
Last 128; Best of 7 frames
(Scotland) Marcus Campbell	4
(England) Rod Lawler	2
(Scotland) Anthony McGill	4
(Wales) Jak Jones	1
(England) Michael Wasley	4
(England) Steve Judd	3
(England) Dave Harold	4
(England) Reanne Evans	0
(England) Peter Lines	2
(England) Sam Baird	4
(England) Tom Ford	4
(Northern Ireland) Patrick Wallace	2
(England) Alfie Burden	4
(England) Robert Milkins	2
(England) Stephen Lee	4
(England) Marc Harman	0

Last 64; Best of 7 frames
(Scotland) Marcus Campbell	4
(Scotland) Anthony McGill	2
(England) Michael Wasley	4
(England) Dave Harold	3
(England) Sam Baird	1
(England) Tom Ford	4
(England) Alfie Burden	1
(England) Stephen Lee	4

Last 32; Best of 7 frames
(Scotland) Marcus Campbell	4
(England) Michael Wasley	3
(England) Tom Ford	4
(England) Stephen Lee	3

Last 16; Best of 7 frames
(Scotland) Marcus Campbell	3
(England) Tom Ford	4

===== Section 7 =====
Last 128; Best of 7 frames
(England) Joe Jogia	4
(Thailand) Issara Kachaiwong	2
(Northern Ireland) Jordan Brown	1
(England) Anthony Hamilton	4
(England) Mitchell Mann	2
(England) Adam Wicheard	4
(England) Shaun Murphy	3
(England) Martin O'Donnell	4
(Northern Ireland) Gerard Greene	4
(England) Ian Burns	1
(Northern Ireland) Joe Swail	2
(England) Stuart Pettman	4
(England) Andrew Higginson	4
(England) Jamie Walker	0
(Wales) Andrew Pagett	4
(England) Charlie Walters	2

Last 64; Best of 7 frames
(England) Joe Jogia	3
(England) Anthony Hamilton	4
(England) Adam Wicheard	4
(England) Martin O'Donnell	1
(Northern Ireland) Gerard Greene	3
(England) Stuart Pettman	4
(England) Andrew Higginson	3
(Wales) Andrew Pagett	4

Last 32; Best of 7 frames
(England) Anthony Hamilton	4
(England) Adam Wicheard	3
(England) Stuart Pettman	1
(Wales) Andrew Pagett	4

Last 16; Best of 7 frames
(England) Anthony Hamilton	4
(Wales) Andrew Pagett	2

===== Section 8 =====
Last 128; Best of 7 frames
(England) Jamie Cope	4
(Republic of Ireland) Ken Doherty	1
(England) Rory McLeod	4
(China) Chen Zhe	1
(England) Mark Davis	4
(England) Andy Lee	0
(England) Liam Highfield	4
(Republic of Ireland) David Morris	1
(England) Mark Joyce	4
(England) Jeff Cundy	2
(England) Matthew Couch	1
(England) Samuel Thistlewhite	4
(England) Adrian Gunnell	4
(China) Zhang Anda	3
(Wales) Mark Williams	1
(England) Ian Glover	4

Last 64; Best of 7 frames
(England) Jamie Cope	0
(England) Rory McLeod	4
(England) Mark Davis	4
(England) Liam Highfield	2
(England) Mark Joyce	4
(England) Samuel Thistlewhite	1
(England) Adrian Gunnell	4
(England) Ian Glover	1

Last 32; Best of 7 frames
(England) Rory McLeod	1
(England) Mark Davis	4
(England) Mark Joyce	3
(England) Adrian Gunnell	4

Last 16; Best of 7 frames
(England) Mark Davis	4
(England) Adrian Gunnell	3

==== Finals ====
Quarter-finals; Best of 7 frames		Semi-finals; Best of 7 frames		Final; Best of 7 frames
(England) Mark Selby	4
(England) Barry Hawkins	3	(England) Mark Selby	3
(England) Jack Lisowski	4	(England) Jack Lisowski	4
(England) Ian McCulloch	1			(England) Jack Lisowski	0
(England) Andy Hicks	1			(England) Tom Ford	4
(England) Tom Ford	4	(England) Tom Ford	4
(England) Anthony Hamilton	1	(England) Mark Davis	2
(England) Mark Davis	4

== Final ==
Final: Best of 7 frames. World Snooker Academy, Sheffield, England, 8 August 2010.
Jack Lisowski; England	0–4	Tom Ford; England
16–85 (85), 5–60, 28–71 (61), 8–83 (51)
–	Highest break	85
0	Century breaks	0
0	50+ breaks	3

== Century breaks ==
- 147, 134, 129, 102 – Barry Hawkins
- 141, 120, 102 – Mark Davis
- 141 – Ryan Day
- 141 – Jeff Cundy
- 140 – Shaun Murphy
- 136 – Neil Robertson
- 133, 118 – Robbie Williams
- 130 – Jamie Cope
- 125 – Rory McLeod
- 123 – Ben Harrison
- 120 – Stuart Bingham
- 118 – James McBain
- 116 – Liam Highfield
- 113, 101, 100 – Stuart Pettman
- 110 – Andy Hicks
- 110 – Anthony Hamilton
- 107 – Stuart Carrington
- 106 – Dominic Dale
- 105 – Martin O'Donnell
- 104, 101 – Mark Selby
- 103 – Martin Gould
