= 2020 World Grand Prix =

2020 World Grand Prix may refer to:

- 2020 World Grand Prix (darts), a darts tournament
- 2020 World Grand Prix (2019–20 season), a snooker tournament held in February 2020
- 2020 World Grand Prix (2020–21 season), a snooker tournament held in December 2020
