= 2015 UK Championship =

Snooker tournament

2015 Betway UK Championship

Tournament information
- Dates: 24 November – 6 December 2015
- Venue: Barbican Centre
- City: York
- Country: England
- Organisation: World Snooker
- Format: Ranking event
- Total prize fund: £732,000
- Winner's share: £150,000
- Highest break: Neil Robertson (AUS) (147)

Final
- Champion: Neil Robertson (AUS)
- Runner-up: Liang Wenbo (CHN)
- Score: 10–5

The 2015 UK Championship (officially the 2015 Betway UK Championship) was a professional ranking snooker tournament that took place between 24 November and 6 December 2015 at the Barbican Centre in York, England. It was the fourth ranking event of the 2015/2016 season.

The 2014 champion Ronnie O'Sullivan, who had not played in professional competition since April, decided not to defend his title. He made his debut as a pundit during the tournament, providing in-studio expert analysis for Eurosport alongside Jimmy White.

On the opening day of the tournament, amateur player Adam Duffy defeated world number 9 and two-time UK Champion Ding Junhui 6–2, a result that was described as "one of the biggest upsets in UK Championship history". In the sixth frame of his third-round match against Neil Robertson, Thailand's Thepchaiya Un-Nooh came close to achieving his first maximum break in professional competition, but missed the final black off the spot.

The final between Australia's Neil Robertson and China's Liang Wenbo marked the first time that a British player did not compete in the UK Championship final. In the sixth frame, Robertson made the 115th official maximum break in professional competition, and the first 147 break ever attained in a Triple Crown snooker final, for which he earned £44,000 (a rolling prize of £40,000 for a 147 break, plus the tournament's £4,000 highest break prize). It was the fourth time in a row, that a maximum was made in a UK Championship. Robertson went on to defeat Liang 10–5 to claim his second UK Championship title, and the 11th ranking title of his career.

A record 104 centuries were made during the tournament, including nine from Robertson and eight from Liang.

== Prize fund ==
The breakdown of prize money for this year is shown below:

- Winner: £150,000
- Runner-up: £70,000
- Semi-final: £30,000
- Quarter-final: £20,000
- Last 16: £12,000
- Last 32: £9,000
- Last 64: £4,000
- Highest break: £4,000
- Total: £732,000

The "rolling 147 prize" for a maximum break stands at £40,000 (8 ranking events since it was last won, £5,000 added for each ranking event)

== Main draw ==
=== Top half ===
==== Section 1 ====
Last 128; Best of 11 frames
1	Stuart Bingham (ENG)	6
A	Jordan Brown (NIR)	1
64	Anthony Hamilton (ENG)	6
65	Peter Lines (ENG)	4
32	Dominic Dale (WAL)	6
97	Michael Wild (ENG)	0
33	Peter Ebdon (ENG)	6
96	Lyu Chenwei (CHN)	0
16	Robert Milkins (ENG)	6
113	Vinnie Calabrese (AUS)	0
49	Andrew Higginson (ENG)	1
80	David Grace (ENG)	6
17	Graeme Dott (SCO)	6
112	Nigel Bond (ENG)	2
48	Jack Lisowski (ENG)	6
81	Zak Surety (ENG)	4

Last 64; Best of 11 frames
1	(England) Stuart Bingham	6
64	(England) Anthony Hamilton	3
32	(Wales) Dominic Dale	5
33	(England) Peter Ebdon	6
16	(England) Robert Milkins	2
80	(England) David Grace	6
17	(Scotland) Graeme Dott	5
48	(England) Jack Lisowski	6

Last 32; Best of 11 frames
1	(England) Stuart Bingham	3
33	(England) Peter Ebdon	6
80	(England) David Grace	6
48	(England) Jack Lisowski	4

Last 16; Best of 11 frames
33	(England) Peter Ebdon	2
80	(England) David Grace	6

==== Section 2 ====
Last 128; Best of 11 frames
41	Gary Wilson (ENG)	6
88	Martin O'Donnell (ENG)	3
24	Martin Gould (ENG)	6
105	Allan Taylor (ENG)	2
56	David Morris (IRL)	5
73	Michael Georgiou (ENG)	6
9	Mark Allen (NIR)	6
Zhao Xintong (CHN)	2
40	Matthew Stevens (WAL)	5
89	Chris Wakelin (ENG)	6
25	Michael Holt (ENG)	6
104	Fraser Patrick (SCO)	4
57	Joe Swail (NIR)	6
72	Joel Walker (ENG)	0
8	Ding Junhui (CHN)	2
A	Adam Duffy (ENG)	6

Last 64; Best of 11 frames
41	(England) Gary Wilson	4
24	(England) Martin Gould	6
73	(England) Michael Georgiou	2
9	(Northern Ireland) Mark Allen	6
89	(England) Chris Wakelin	2
25	(England) Michael Holt	6
57	(Northern Ireland) Joe Swail	6
(England) Adam Duffy	5

Last 32; Best of 11 frames
24	(England) Martin Gould	6
9	(Northern Ireland) Mark Allen	4
25	(England) Michael Holt	1
57	(Northern Ireland) Joe Swail	6

Last 16; Best of 11 frames
24	(England) Martin Gould	6
57	(Northern Ireland) Joe Swail	3

==== Section 3 ====
Last 128; Best of 11 frames
5	Judd Trump (ENG)	6
A	Hammad Miah (ENG)	1
60	Stuart Carrington (ENG)	6
69	Liam Highfield (ENG)	4
28	Liang Wenbo (CHN)	6
101	Gareth Allen (WAL)	1
37	Jimmy Robertson (ENG)	6
92	Lu Ning (CHN)	4
12	Mark Williams (WAL)	6
117	Hamza Akbar (PAK)	4
53	Tom Ford (ENG)	6
76	Scott Donaldson (SCO)	1
21	Kyren Wilson (ENG)	6
108	Paul Davison (ENG)	3
44	Mike Dunn (ENG)	6
85	Thanawat Thirapongpaiboon (THA)	3

Last 64; Best of 11 frames
5	(England) Judd Trump	6
60	(England) Stuart Carrington	3
28	(China) Liang Wenbo	6
37	(England) Jimmy Robertson	2
12	(Wales) Mark Williams	5
53	(England) Tom Ford	6
21	(England) Kyren Wilson	6
44	(England) Mike Dunn	2

Last 32; Best of 11 frames
5	(England) Judd Trump	4
28	(China) Liang Wenbo	6
53	(England) Tom Ford	6
21	(England) Kyren Wilson	1

Last 16; Best of 11 frames
28	(China) Liang Wenbo	6
53	(England) Tom Ford	5

==== Section 4 ====
Last 128; Best of 11 frames
45	Gerard Greene (NIR)	6
84	Michael Leslie (SCO)	0
20	David Gilbert (ENG)	6
109	Jason Weston (ENG)	1
52	Yu Delu (CHN)	6
77	Michael Wasley (ENG)	2
13	Marco Fu (HKG)	6
116	Hatem Yassen (EGY)	2
36	Mark King (ENG)	5
93	Ross Muir (SCO)	6
29	Ben Woollaston (ENG)	6
100	Steven Hallworth (ENG)	1
61	Zhou Yuelong (CHN)	6
68	Craig Steadman (ENG)	3
4	Shaun Murphy (ENG)	6
A	Ashley Hugill (ENG)	1

Last 64; Best of 11 frames
45	(Northern Ireland) Gerard Greene	5
20	(England) David Gilbert	6
52	(China) Yu Delu	0
13	(Hong Kong) Marco Fu	6
93	(Scotland) Ross Muir	5
29	(England) Ben Woollaston	6
61	(China) Zhou Yuelong	1
4	(England) Shaun Murphy	6

Last 32; Best of 11 frames
20	(England) David Gilbert	3
13	(Hong Kong) Marco Fu	6
29	(England) Ben Woollaston	2
4	(England) Shaun Murphy	6

Last 16; Best of 11 frames
13	(Hong Kong) Marco Fu	6
4	(England) Shaun Murphy	4

=== Bottom half ===
==== Section 5 ====
Last 128; Best of 11 frames
3	Neil Robertson (AUS)	6
A	Alex Taubman (WAL)	3
62	Aditya Mehta (IND)	6
67	Sam Baird (ENG)	5
30	Fergal O'Brien (IRL)	6
99	Thor Chuan Leong (MYS)	5
35	Thepchaiya Un-Nooh (THA)	6
94	Darryl Hill (IOM)	3
14	Stephen Maguire (SCO)	6
115	Jimmy White (ENG)	5
51	Rory McLeod (ENG)	5
78	Jamie Cope (ENG)	6
19	Mark Davis (ENG)	6
110	Rhys Clark (SCO)	1
46	Ken Doherty (IRL)	6
83	Tony Drago (MLT)	0

Last 64; Best of 11 frames
3	(Australia) Neil Robertson	6
62	(India) Aditya Mehta	2
30	(Republic of Ireland) Fergal O'Brien	5
35	(Thailand) Thepchaiya Un-Nooh	6
14	(Scotland) Stephen Maguire	6
78	(England) Jamie Cope	0
19	(England) Mark Davis	6
46	(Republic of Ireland) Ken Doherty	3

Last 32; Best of 11 frames
3	(Australia) Neil Robertson	6
35	(Thailand) Thepchaiya Un-Nooh	2
14	(Scotland) Stephen Maguire	6
19	(England) Mark Davis	4

Last 16; Best of 11 frames
3	(Australia) Neil Robertson	6
14	(Scotland) Stephen Maguire	1

==== Section 6 ====
Last 128; Best of 11 frames
43	Jamie Burnett (SCO)	6
86	Sanderson Lam (ENG)	1
22	Alan McManus (SCO)	6
107	Eden Sharav (SCO)	5
54	Li Hang (CHN)	6
75	Lee Walker (WAL)	5
11	Ricky Walden (ENG)	6
118	Itaro Santos (BRA)	1
38	Rod Lawler (ENG)	4
91	Daniel Wells (WAL)	6
27	Ali Carter (ENG)	6
102	Alfie Burden (ENG)	4
59	Tian Pengfei (CHN)	6
70	Ian Burns (ENG)	1
6	John Higgins (SCO)	6
A	Leo Fernandez (IRL)	1

Last 64; Best of 11 frames
43	(Scotland) Jamie Burnett	6
22	(Scotland) Alan McManus	3
54	(China) Li Hang	6
11	(England) Ricky Walden	5
91	(Wales) Daniel Wells	3
27	(England) Ali Carter	6
59	(China) Tian Pengfei	2
6	(Scotland) John Higgins	6

Last 32; Best of 11 frames
43	(Scotland) Jamie Burnett	6
54	(China) Li Hang	3
27	(England) Ali Carter	2
6	(Scotland) John Higgins	6

Last 16; Best of 11 frames
43	(Scotland) Jamie Burnett	4
6	(Scotland) John Higgins	6

==== Section 7 ====
Last 128; Best of 11 frames
7	Barry Hawkins (ENG)	6
A	Andy Hicks (ENG)	5
58	Robin Hull (FIN)	6
71	Zhang Anda (CHN)	4
26	Anthony McGill (SCO)	6
103	James Cahill (ENG)	3
39	Luca Brecel (BEL)	6
90	Hossein Vafaei (IRN)	1
10	Joe Perry (ENG)	6
119	James Wattana (THA)	1
55	Robbie Williams (ENG)	6
74	Mitchell Mann (ENG)	3
23	Matthew Selt (ENG)	6
106	Zhang Yong (CHN)	5
42	Kurt Maflin (NOR)	3
87	Sean O'Sullivan (ENG)	6

Last 64; Best of 11 frames
7	(England) Barry Hawkins	3
58	(Finland) Robin Hull	6
26	(Scotland) Anthony McGill	4
39	(Belgium) Luca Brecel	6
10	(England) Joe Perry	3
55	(England) Robbie Williams	6
23	(England) Matthew Selt	6
87	(England) Sean O'Sullivan	4

Last 32; Best of 11 frames
58	(Finland) Robin Hull	2
39	(Belgium) Luca Brecel	6
55	(England) Robbie Williams	3
23	(England) Matthew Selt	6

Last 16; Best of 11 frames
39	(Belgium) Luca Brecel	4
23	(England) Matthew Selt	6

==== Section 8 ====
Last 128; Best of 11 frames
47	Dechawat Poomjaeng (THA)	6
82	Chris Melling (ENG)	4
18	Ryan Day (WAL)	6
111	Duane Jones (WAL)	1
50	Mark Joyce (ENG)	6
79	Barry Pinches (ENG)	4
15	Michael White (WAL)	5
114	Sydney Wilson (ENG)	6
34	Xiao Guodong (CHN)	6
95	Noppon Saengkham (THA)	5
31	Jamie Jones (WAL)	6
98	Ian Glover (ENG)	4
63	Cao Yupeng (CHN)	2
66	Oliver Lines (ENG)	6
2	Mark Selby (ENG)	6
A	Joe O'Connor (ENG)	0

Last 64; Best of 11 frames
47	(Thailand) Dechawat Poomjaeng	6
18	(Wales) Ryan Day	2
50	(England) Mark Joyce	6
114	(England) Sydney Wilson	2
34	(China) Xiao Guodong	1
31	(Wales) Jamie Jones	6
66	(England) Oliver Lines	0
2	(England) Mark Selby	6

Last 32; Best of 11 frames
47	(Thailand) Dechawat Poomjaeng	6
50	(England) Mark Joyce	5
31	(Wales) Jamie Jones	5
2	(England) Mark Selby	6

Last 16; Best of 11 frames
47	(Thailand) Dechawat Poomjaeng	1
2	(England) Mark Selby	6

=== Finals ===
Quarter-finals; Best of 11 frames
80	(England) David Grace	6
24	(England) Martin Gould	5
28	(China) Liang Wenbo	6
13	(Hong Kong) Marco Fu	5
3	(Australia) Neil Robertson	6
6	(Scotland) John Higgins	5
23	(England) Matthew Selt	1
2	(England) Mark Selby	6

Semi-finals; Best of 11 frames
80	(England) David Grace	4
28	(China) Liang Wenbo	6
3	(Australia) Neil Robertson	6
2	(England) Mark Selby	0

Final; Best of 19 frames
28	(China) Liang Wenbo	5
3	(Australia) Neil Robertson	10

== Final ==
Final: Best of 19 frames. Referee: Jan Verhaas. Barbican Centre, York, England, 6 December 2015.
Liang Wenbo (28); China	5–10	Neil Robertson (3); Australia
Afternoon: 40–71, 16–69 (60), 110–0 (110), 6–106 (106), 62–59, 0–151 (147), 33–69 (69), 86–0 (86); Evening: 90–27 (82), 47–78 (78), 15–74, 78–1 (78), 35–70 (56), 55–59, 9–62
110	Highest break	147
1	Century breaks	2
4	50+ breaks	6

== Century breaks ==
Source: World Professional Billiards and Snooker Association (worldsnookerdata.com)

- 147, 145, 126, 120, 114, 113, 106, 106, 101 – Neil Robertson
- 143, 126, 100 – Stuart Bingham
- 142, 128, 127 – Anthony McGill
- 141 – Gary Wilson
- 140, 116 – Thepchaiya Un-Nooh
- 138, 132, 122, 110, 110, 106, 104, 104 – Liang Wenbo
- 138 – Gerard Greene
- 137, 128 – Mark Davis
- 136 – David Morris
- 135, 109, 101 – Peter Ebdon
- 135 – Anthony Hamilton
- 135 – Liam Highfield
- 134, 134, 129, 119, 103, 102 – John Higgins
- 133, 113, 106 – Mark Selby
- 133, 111, 111, 110 – Jamie Jones
- 133 – Fergal O'Brien
- 132, 119 – Ken Doherty
- 131, 127, 125, 108 – Martin Gould
- 131, 107 – Xiao Guodong
- 129, 121 – Ben Woollaston
- 127, 125, 118 – Stephen Maguire
- 126, 100 – Chris Wakelin
- 125, 111 – Tom Ford
- 124, 106, 102, 100 – Shaun Murphy
- 123, 113 – Dechawat Poomjaeng
- 123 – Mark King
- 123 – Alex Taubman
- 118 – Jimmy Robertson
- 117 – Matthew Selt
- 116 – Tian Pengfei
- 115, 107, 102, 102 – Mark Allen
- 114, 103 – Li Hang
- 112, 101 – Judd Trump
- 112 – Sam Baird
- 111 – Jamie Burnett
- 110 – Mike Dunn
- 108, 102 – Michael Holt
- 108 – Stuart Carrington
- 105 – Mark Williams
- 105 – Barry Pinches
- 104, 103, 102 – Marco Fu
- 104 – Jimmy White
- 102 – Ali Carter
- 102 – Luca Brecel
- 101 – Graeme Dott
- 101 – Joe Perry
- 101 – Oliver Lines
- 100 – David Grace
- 100 – Dominic Dale
