= Asian Tour 2014/2015 – Event 1 =

Asian Tour 2014/2015 Event 1
Tournament information
- Dates: 17–21 June 2014
- Venue: Yixing Sports Centre
- City: Yixing
- Country: China
- Organisation: World Snooker
- Format: Minor-ranking event
- Total prize fund: £50,000
- Winner's share: £10,000
- Highest break: Li Hang (CHN) (136)

Final
- Champion: Ding Junhui (CHN)
- Runner-up: Michael Holt (ENG)
- Score: 4–2

The Asian Tour 2014/2015 – Event 1 (also known as the 2014 Yixing Open) was a professional minor-rankingsnooker tournament that took place between 17 and 21 June 2014 at the Yixing Sports Centre in Yixing, China.

Joe Perry was the defending champion, but he lost 1–4 against Ding Junhui in the last 16.

Ding won his 17th professional title by defeating Michael Holt 4–2 in the final.

== Prize fund ==
The breakdown of prize money of the event is shown below:

	Prize fund
Winner	£10,000
Runner-up	£5,000
Semi-finalist	£2,500
Quarter-finalist	£1,500
Last 16	£1,000
Last 32	£600
Last 64	£200
Total	£50,000

== Main draw ==
=== Preliminary round ===
Best of 7 frames

(China) Duan Yanfeng	4–3	(China) Wli Bo
(China) Liu Yiqi	4–2	(China) Chui Homan
(China) Qian Hua	3–4	(China) Zhang Yi
(China) Geng Mingqi	4–2	(China) Zhu Zhenjiang
(China) Tu Jiong	4–3	(China) Li Tianen
(China) Qin Jianfeng	4–3	(China) Liang Jianfeng
(Thailand) Kobkit Palajin	4–2	(Hong Kong) Lin Tang Ho

(China) Liu Ming	4–1	(China) Shen Cheng
(China) Zhang Yong	4–2	(China) Wu Jinquan
(China) Chen Wen	4–2	(China) He Guoqiang
(China) Feng Zeyuan	4–0	(Thailand) Phanuwat Chitdi
(China) Lei Zhen	4–1	(China) Qiu Yalong
(China) Cao Kaisheng	4–1	(China) Min Changqing

=== Main rounds ===
==== Top half ====
===== Section 1 =====
Last 128; Best of 7 frames
(China) Ding Junhui	4
(China) Zhao Xintong	1
(Wales) Jamie Jones	4
(China) Zong Zhe	0
(Malta) Tony Drago	4
(China) Duan Yanfeng	0
(China) Fang Xiongman	4
(China) Huang Hooyong	3
(Qatar) Ahmed Saif	w/d
(China) Cheng Sihong	w/o
(England) Ben Woollaston	4
(China) Li Yujin	2
(England) Joe Perry	4
(China) Li Yan	0
(China) Lyu Haotian	4
(China) Liu Yiqi	2

Last 64; Best of 7 frames
(China) Ding Junhui	4
(Wales) Jamie Jones	1
(Malta) Tony Drago	4
(China) Fang Xiongman	1
(China) Cheng Sihong	0
(England) Ben Woollaston	4
(England) Joe Perry	4
(China) Lyu Haotian	0

Last 32; Best of 7 frames
(China) Ding Junhui	4
(Malta) Tony Drago	1
(England) Ben Woollaston	1
(England) Joe Perry	4

Last 16; Best of 7 frames
(China) Ding Junhui	4
(England) Joe Perry	1

===== Section 2 =====
Last 128; Best of 7 frames
(China) Cao Xinlong	4
(China) Xu Xinjian	0
(China) Hu Hao	2
(China) Zhang Yi	4
(England) Michael Georgiou	4
(China) Pan Weixing	1
(Scotland) Jamie Burnett	4
(China) Xie Zhaoze	0
(England) Andrew Norman	4
(China) Zhang Yadong	1
(China) Zhang Anda	4
(China) Ma Bing	1
(Thailand) Thepchaiya Un-Nooh	4
(China) Ding Kai	1
(England) Craig Steadman	4
(China) Lin Shuai	1

Last 64; Best of 7 frames
(China) Cao Xinlong	4
(China) Zhang Yi	1
(England) Michael Georgiou	2
(Scotland) Jamie Burnett	4
(England) Andrew Norman	2
(China) Zhang Anda	4
(Thailand) Thepchaiya Un-Nooh	4
(England) Craig Steadman	3

Last 32; Best of 7 frames
(China) Cao Xinlong	2
(Scotland) Jamie Burnett	4
(China) Zhang Anda	2
(Thailand) Thepchaiya Un-Nooh	4

Last 16; Best of 7 frames
(Scotland) Jamie Burnett	4
(Thailand) Thepchaiya Un-Nooh	0

===== Section 3 =====
Last 128; Best of 7 frames
(England) David Grace	4
(China) Geng Mingqi	1
(China) Lu Chenwei	4
(China) Tu Jiong	0
(Scotland) Fraser Patrick	4
(China) Chen Junhao	1
(China) Zhou Yuelong	4
(China) Liu Jiaming	2
(England) Matthew Selt	4
(China) Qin Jianfeng	0
(Scotland) Ross Muir	4
(England) Martin O'Donnell	2
(Wales) Ryan Day	4
(China) Niu Zhuang	1
(England) Lee Page	4
(China) Huang Jiahao	2

Last 64; Best of 7 frames
(England) David Grace	4
(China) Lu Chenwei	1
(Scotland) Fraser Patrick	4
(China) Zhou Yuelong	2
(England) Matthew Selt	3
(Scotland) Ross Muir	4
(Wales) Ryan Day	4
(England) Lee Page	1

Last 32; Best of 7 frames
(England) David Grace	4
(Scotland) Fraser Patrick	2
(Scotland) Ross Muir	2
(Wales) Ryan Day	4

Last 16; Best of 7 frames
(England) David Grace	0
(Wales) Ryan Day	4

===== Section 4 =====
Last 128; Best of 7 frames
(China) Chen Zifan	1
(England) Sean O'Sullivan	4
(China) Guan Zhen	4
(China) Xu Si	2
(China) Yu Delu	4
(China) Xu Yongwen	0
(China) Ju Reti	4
(China) Chen Zhe	1
(China) Tang Jun	4
(China) Xia Fukaiti	0
(China) Yan Bingtao	4
(China) Li Yunfei	1
(Wales) Mark Williams	4
(China) Chen Xu	0
(England) Stuart Bingham	4
(Australia) Timothy Ng	0

Last 64; Best of 7 frames
(England) Sean O'Sullivan	4
(China) Guan Zhen	0
(China) Yu Delu	4
(China) Ju Reti	3
(China) Tang Jun	2
(China) Yan Bingtao	4
(Wales) Mark Williams	3
(England) Stuart Bingham	4

Last 32; Best of 7 frames
(England) Sean O'Sullivan	3
(China) Yu Delu	4
(China) Yan Bingtao	4
(England) Stuart Bingham	0

Last 16; Best of 7 frames
(China) Yu Delu	4
(China) Yan Bingtao	2

==== Bottom half ====
===== Section 5 =====
Last 128; Best of 7 frames
(Scotland) John Higgins	4
(Thailand) Kobkit Palajin	0
(England) Martin Gould	2
(China) Chen Feilong	4
(China) Cai Jianzhong	4
(China) Liu Ming	0
(Thailand) Dechawat Poomjaeng	4
(China) Luo Guangsheng	2
(China) Liang Wenbo	3
(China) Wang Heng	4
(China) Liu Chuang	4
(England) Michael Tomlinson	2
(England) Peter Lines	4
(China) Yuan Sijun	2
(China) Li Hang	4
(China) Si Jiaxin	0

Last 64; Best of 7 frames
(Scotland) John Higgins	3
(China) Chen Feilong	4
(China) Cai Jianzhong	0
(Thailand) Dechawat Poomjaeng	4
(China) Wang Heng	3
(China) Liu Chuang	4
(England) Peter Lines	1
(China) Li Hang	4

Last 32; Best of 7 frames
(China) Chen Feilong	2
(Thailand) Dechawat Poomjaeng	4
(China) Liu Chuang	0
(China) Li Hang	4

Last 16; Best of 7 frames
(Thailand) Dechawat Poomjaeng	3
(China) Li Hang	4

===== Section 6 =====
Last 128; Best of 7 frames
(Norway) Kurt Maflin	4
(China) Ma Tingpeng	1
(China) Li Yuan	0
(China) Pa Ruke	4
(Scotland) Graeme Dott	4
(China) Wang Yuchen	2
(China) Rouzi Maimaiti	2
(China) Luo Honghao	4
(China) Da Hailin	w/d
(China) Cai Peng	w/o
(England) Michael Holt	4
(China) Zhang Yong	1
(China) Lu Ning	4
(China) Chen Wen	1
(Thailand) Noppon Saengkham	4
(China) Gao Le	0

Last 64; Best of 7 frames
(Norway) Kurt Maflin	4
(China) Pa Ruke	2
(Scotland) Graeme Dott	4
(China) Luo Honghao	0
(China) Cai Peng	2
(England) Michael Holt	4
(China) Lu Ning	3
(Thailand) Noppon Saengkham	4

Last 32; Best of 7 frames
(Norway) Kurt Maflin	4
(Scotland) Graeme Dott	2
(England) Michael Holt	4
(Thailand) Noppon Saengkham	1

Last 16; Best of 7 frames
(Norway) Kurt Maflin	2
(England) Michael Holt	4

===== Section 7 =====
Last 128; Best of 7 frames
(China) Tian Pengfei	4
(China) Feng Zeyuan	0
(Scotland) Scott Donaldson	4
(China) Chen Feng	1
(England) Sam Baird	1
(China) Shan Xianshu	4
(China) Zhong Lin	3
(China) Long Zehuang	4
(England) Barry Pinches	4
(China) Long Yun	2
(England) Oliver Lines	4
(China) Pang Junxu	2
(China) Mei Xiwen	4
(China) Sun Hongrui	3
(England) Mark King	4
(China) Wang Zepeng	1

Last 64; Best of 7 frames
(China) Tian Pengfei	3
(Scotland) Scott Donaldson	4
(China) Shan Xianshu	3
(China) Long Zehuang	4
(England) Barry Pinches	2
(England) Oliver Lines	4
(China) Mei Xiwen	4
(England) Mark King	1

Last 32; Best of 7 frames
(Scotland) Scott Donaldson	4
(China) Long Zehuang	0
(England) Oliver Lines	4
(China) Mei Xiwen	2

Last 16; Best of 7 frames
(Scotland) Scott Donaldson	4
(England) Oliver Lines	2

===== Section 8 =====
Last 128; Best of 7 frames
(Scotland) Marcus Campbell	4
(China) Chen Ruifu	3
(China) Xiao Guodong	4
(China) Lin Yongzhi	2
(China) Cao Yupeng	4
(China) Lei Zhen	1
(England) Ian Glover	4
(China) Ren Jiaxing	0
(England) James Cahill	4
(Scotland) Paul Ingram	0
(England) Robert Milkins	4
(China) Zhong Asheng	0
(Scotland) Stephen Maguire	4
(China) Cao Kaisheng	1
(Hong Kong) Marco Fu	4
(Hong Kong) Au Chi-wai	2

Last 64; Best of 7 frames
(Scotland) Marcus Campbell	1
(China) Xiao Guodong	4
(China) Cao Yupeng	3
(England) Ian Glover	4
(England) James Cahill	1
(England) Robert Milkins	4
(Scotland) Stephen Maguire	3
(Hong Kong) Marco Fu	4

Last 32; Best of 7 frames
(China) Xiao Guodong	4
(England) Ian Glover	1
(England) Robert Milkins	4
(Hong Kong) Marco Fu	1

Last 16; Best of 7 frames
(China) Xiao Guodong	2
(England) Robert Milkins	4

==== Finals ====
Quarter-finals; Best of 7 frames		Semi-finals; Best of 7 frames		Final; Best of 7 frames
(China) Ding Junhui	4
(Scotland) Jamie Burnett	2	(China) Ding Junhui	4
(Wales) Ryan Day	4	(Wales) Ryan Day	2
(China) Yu Delu	1			(China) Ding Junhui	4
(China) Li Hang	3			(England) Michael Holt	2
(England) Michael Holt	4	(England) Michael Holt	4
(Scotland) Scott Donaldson	1	(England) Robert Milkins	2
(England) Robert Milkins	4

== Century breaks ==
- 136, 103, 101, 100 – Li Hang
- 135, 128, 124, 120, 119 – Ding Junhui
- 135 – Michael Holt
- 129 – Ryan Day
- 127 – Barry Pinches
- 125, 105 – Craig Steadman
- 124, 102 – Robert Milkins
- 120 – Chen Feilong
- 117 – Graeme Dott
- 112 – Yu Delu
- 110, 103, 101 – Jamie Burnett
- 110 – Qian Hua
- 108 – Sean O'Sullivan
- 104 – Matthew Selt
- 104 – Lu Ning
- 104 – Stuart Bingham
