= Snooker at the 2009 World Games – men's singles =

Snooker men's singles at the 2009 World Games
- Venue: Chung Cheng Martial Arts Stadium, Kaohsiung, Taiwan
- Dates: 22–26 July 2009
- Competitors: 16 from 9 nations

Medalists
gold medal	(United Kingdom) Nigel Bond
silver medal	(United Kingdom) David Grace
bronze medal	(United Arab Emirates) Mohammed Shehab

The men's singles snooker competition at the 2009 World Games took place between 22 and 26 July at the Chung Cheng Martial Arts Stadium in Kaohsiung, Taiwan.

== Last 16 ==
Francois Ellis (South Africa)	0–3	(Chinese Taipei) Shu Hung Lin
David Grace (United Kingdom)	3–2	(Thailand) Atthasit Mahitthi
Glen Wilkinson (Australia)	1–3	(Iran) Soheil Vahedi
Mike Dunn (United Kingdom)	2–3	(Egypt) Mohamed Awad
Nigel Bond (United Kingdom)	3–0	(New Zealand) Dene O'Kane
Paul Davies (United Kingdom)	1–3	(Thailand) Thepchaiya Un-Nooh
Stephen Craigie (United Kingdom)	2–3	(United Arab Emirates) Mohammed Shehab
Wu Yu Lun (Chinese Taipei)	3–1	(United Kingdom) Ricky Walden

== Last 8 ==
Quarter-finals
(Chinese Taipei) Shu Hung Lin	1
(United Kingdom) David Grace	3
(Iran) Soheil Vahedi	3
(Egypt) Mohamed Awad	1
(United Kingdom) Nigel Bond	3
(Thailand) Thepchaiya Un-Nooh	2
(United Arab Emirates) Mohammed Shehab	3
(Chinese Taipei) Wu Yu Lun	0

Semi-finals
(United Kingdom) David Grace	3
(Iran) Soheil Vahedi	1
(United Kingdom) Nigel Bond	3
(United Arab Emirates) Mohammed Shehab	2

Gold medal match
(United Kingdom) David Grace	0
(United Kingdom) Nigel Bond	3
Bronze medal match
(Iran) Soheil Vahedi	2
(United Arab Emirates) Mohammed Shehab	3
