= Wu Yu Lun =

Taiwanese snooker player

Wu Yu Lun (Chinese: 吳育綸) is a Taiwanese snooker player.

== Career ==
Wu represented Chinese Taipei when competing at snooker tournament at the 2009 World Games in Kaohsiung. He caused a massive upset as he beat the highest-ranked participating player, Ricky Walden, in the first round. He lost in the second round to Mohammed Shehab.
