= 2020 World Grand Prix (2020–21 season) =

Snooker tournament held in December 2020

2020 Matchroom World Grand Prix
Tournament information
- Dates: 14–20 December 2020
- Venue: Marshall Arena
- City: Milton Keynes
- Country: England
- Organisation: World Snooker Tour
- Format: Ranking event
- Total prize fund: £380,000
- Winner's share: £100,000
- Highest break: Mark Selby (ENG) (143)

Final
- Champion: Judd Trump (ENG)
- Runner-up: Jack Lisowski (ENG)
- Score: 10–7

The 2020 World Grand Prix (officially the 2020 Matchroom World Grand Prix) was a professional snooker tournament, that took place from 14 to 20 December 2020 at the Marshall Arena in Milton Keynes, England. Although the tournament was not sponsored by Cazoo, it was the first of three tournaments that form the Cazoo Cup.

Neil Robertson was the defending champion, having won the previous final 10–8 against Graeme Dott. However, Robertson lost 2–4 to Robert Milkins in the first round.

Judd Trump won the tournament for the third time, beating Jack Lisowski 10–7 to claim his 20th ranking title.

== Prize fund ==
The event had a total prize fund of £380,000, with £100,000 to the winner. The participation prize is £5,000, which does not count towards a player's world ranking. The breakdown of prize money for the event:

- Winner: £100,000
- Runner-up: £40,000
- Semi-final: £20,000
- Quarter-final: £12,500
- Last 16: £7,500
- Last 32: £5,000 (Prize money at this stage did not count towards prize money rankings)
- Highest break: £10,000
- Total: £380,000

== Seeding list ==
The top 32 players on the one-year ranking list, running from the September 2020 European Masters until and including the 2020 Scottish Open, qualified for the tournament.

Rank	Player	Total points
1	Judd Trump (ENG)	270,500
2	Neil Robertson (AUS)	246,000
3	Mark Selby (ENG)	205,500
4	Kyren Wilson (ENG)	92,500
5	Ronnie O'Sullivan (ENG)	73,500
6	Zhou Yuelong (CHN)	70,000
7	John Higgins (SCO)	58,500
8	Lu Ning (CHN)	52,000
9	Martin Gould (ENG)	48,500
10	Jamie Jones (WAL)	45,000
11	Ding Junhui (CHN)	45,000
12	Barry Hawkins (ENG)	45,000
13	David Grace (ENG)	41,000
14	Joe Perry (ENG)	38,500
15	Shaun Murphy (ENG)	37,000
16	Li Hang (CHN)	36,000
17	Stuart Bingham (ENG)	35,500
18	Jack Lisowski (ENG)	34,500
19	Anthony McGill (SCO)	33,500
20	Yan Bingtao (CHN)	32,500
21	Ricky Walden (ENG)	31,000
22	Jak Jones (WAL)	31,000
23	Zhao Xintong (CHN)	31,000
24	Mark Allen (NIR)	29,000
25	Robbie Williams (ENG)	29,000
26	Xiao Guodong (CHN)	28,000
27	Hossein Vafaei (IRN)	27,500
28	Ali Carter (ENG)	27,000
29	Kurt Maflin (NOR)	27,000
30	Liang Wenbo (CHN)	26,000
31	Robert Milkins (ENG)	26,000
32	Michael Holt (ENG)	26,000

== Tournament draw ==
Last 32; Best of 7 frames
1	Judd Trump (ENG)	4
32	Michael Holt (ENG)	3
16	Li Hang (CHN)	2
17	Stuart Bingham (ENG)	4
9	Martin Gould (ENG)	4
24	Mark Allen (NIR)	3
8	Lu Ning (CHN)	4
25	Robbie Williams (ENG)	3
5	Ronnie O'Sullivan (ENG)	4
28	Ali Carter (ENG)	1
12	Barry Hawkins (ENG)	4
21	Ricky Walden (ENG)	1
13	David Grace (ENG)	3
20	Yan Bingtao (CHN)	4
4	Kyren Wilson (ENG)	4
29	Kurt Maflin (NOR)	2
3	Mark Selby (ENG)	4
30	Liang Wenbo (CHN)	3
14	Joe Perry (ENG)	2
19	Anthony McGill (SCO)	4
11	Ding Junhui (CHN)	4
22	Jak Jones (WAL)	0
6	Zhou Yuelong (CHN)	3
27	Hossein Vafaei (IRN)	4
7	John Higgins (SCO)	4
26	Xiao Guodong (CHN)	2
10	Jamie Jones (WAL)	2
23	Zhao Xintong (CHN)	4
15	Shaun Murphy (ENG)	2
18	Jack Lisowski (ENG)	4
2	Neil Robertson (AUS)	2
31	Robert Milkins (ENG)	4

Last 16; Best of 7 frames
1	(England) Judd Trump	4
17	(England) Stuart Bingham	3
9	(England) Martin Gould	4
8	(China) Lu Ning	1
5	(England) Ronnie O'Sullivan	4
12	(England) Barry Hawkins	1
20	(China) Yan Bingtao	1
4	(England) Kyren Wilson	4
3	(England) Mark Selby	4
19	(Scotland) Anthony McGill	2
11	(China) Ding Junhui	1
27	(Iran) Hossein Vafaei	4
7	(Scotland) John Higgins	3
23	(China) Zhao Xintong	4
18	(England) Jack Lisowski	4
31	(England) Robert Milkins	0

Quarter-finals; Best of 9 frames
1	(England) Judd Trump	5
9	(England) Martin Gould	2
5	(England) Ronnie O'Sullivan	5
4	(England) Kyren Wilson	3
3	(England) Mark Selby	5
27	(Iran) Hossein Vafaei	3
23	(China) Zhao Xintong	3
18	(England) Jack Lisowski	5

Semi-finals; Best of 11 frames
1	(England) Judd Trump	6
5	(England) Ronnie O'Sullivan	1
3	(England) Mark Selby	4
18	(England) Jack Lisowski	6

Final; Best of 19 frames
1	(England) Judd Trump	10
18	(England) Jack Lisowski	7

=== Final ===
Final: Best of 19 frames. Referee: Brendan Moore; Marshall Arena, Milton Keynes, England, 20 December 2020
Judd Trump (1); England	10–7	Jack Lisowski (18); England
Afternoon: 75–4, 44–72, 95–42, 122–0 (122), 82–25, 93–1, 4–77, 67–40; Evening: 67–53, 1–104, 8–116 (112), 0–87, 0–95, 62–53, 0–78, 104–0, 72–61
122	Highest break	112
1	Century breaks	1

== Century breaks ==
A total of 38 century breaks were made by 20 players during the tournament.

- 143, 134, 112, 100 – Mark Selby
- 142, 122, 109, 107, 107, 101, 101, 100 – Judd Trump
- 142 – Mark Allen
- 139 – Kyren Wilson
- 137, 111 – Zhao Xintong
- 137 – Ding Junhui
- 137 – Lu Ning
- 136 – Michael Holt
- 134 – Hossein Vafaei
- 132 – Stuart Bingham
- 130, 127, 112, 111, 110, 109 – Jack Lisowski
- 128, 108 – Anthony McGill
- 128 – Xiao Guodong
- 117 – Martin Gould
- 116 – Robert Milkins
- 114 – John Higgins
- 112 – Ali Carter
- 112 – Barry Hawkins
- 108, 105 – Ronnie O'Sullivan
- 100 – Robbie Williams
