= Jack Lisowski =

English snooker player (born 1991)

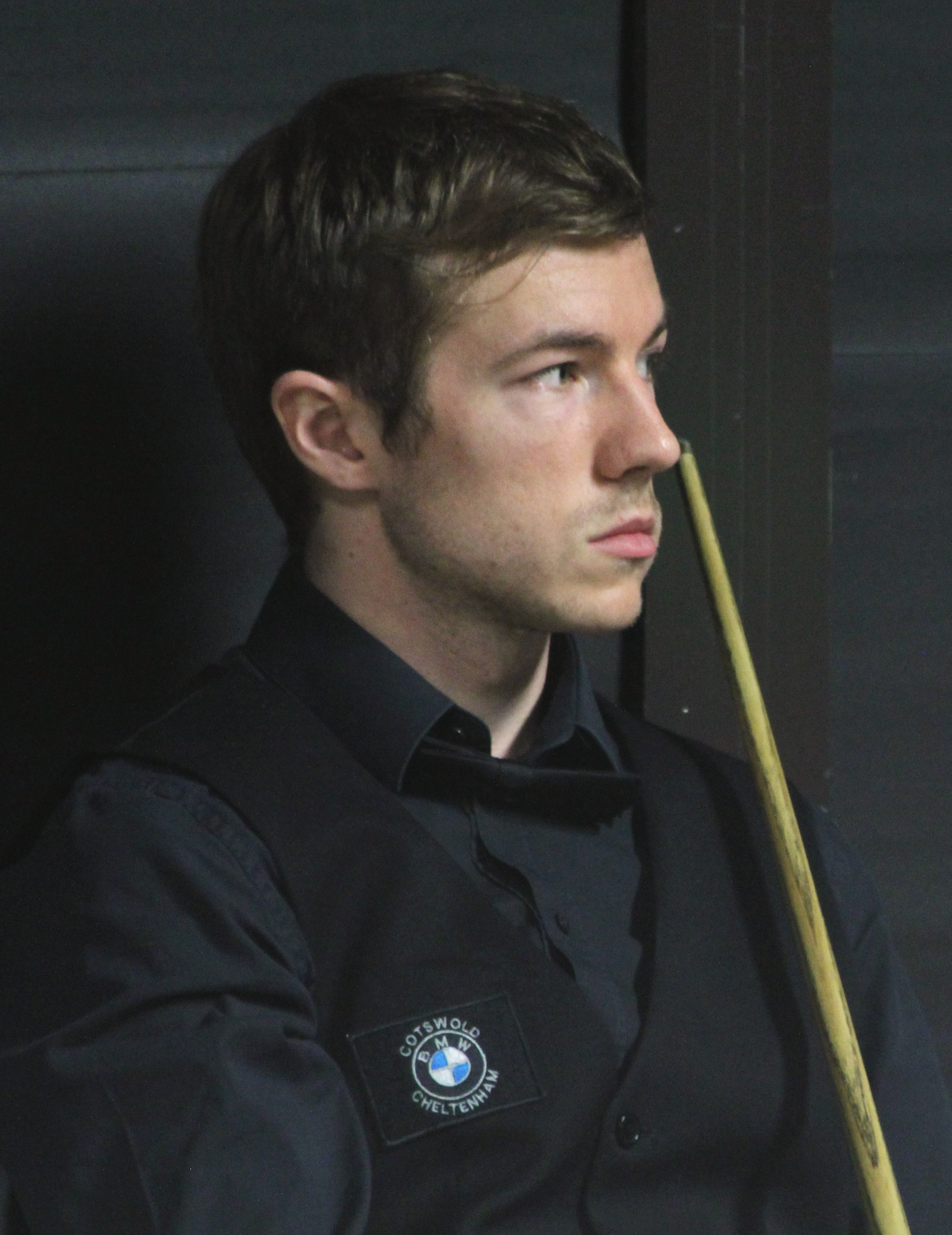
- Lisowski at the 2016 Paul Hunter Classic

Personal information
- Nickname: Jack-pot
- Born: 25 June 1991 (age 35) Cheltenham, Gloucestershire, England

Sport
- Country: England
- Sport: Snooker
- Professional: 2010–present
- Highest ranking: 10 (March 2021, May 2022, December 2022)
- Current ranking: 19 (as of 7 November 2026)
- Maximum breaks: 2
- Century breaks: 393 (as of 21 November 2026)

Tournament wins
- Ranking: 1

Jack Adam Lisowski (born 25 June 1991) is an English professional snooker player from Churchdown, Gloucestershire. He turned professional in 2010 by finishing first in the 2009/2010 PIOS rankings. A left-handed player, he is known for his attacking style of play.

Lisowski lost his first six ranking finals, three to Judd Trump, two to Neil Robertson and one to Mark Selby. He reached his seventh ranking final at the 2025 Northern Ireland Open and defeated Trump 9–8 to win his maiden ranking title. Lisowski has made over 300 career century breaks, including two maximums.

== Career ==
=== Amateur years ===
Lisowski began playing "snooker" at the age of seven, using ping-pong balls on a carpet. As a young player, he was trained by Gloucester professional Nick Pearce. He made his first century break at the age of 10. He was runner-up to Mitchell Mann in the 2007 Junior Pot Black.

In the 2008/2009 season he was runner-up in the sixth event of the International Open Series to Xiao Guodong, and finished 23rd in the rankings. In 2009 Lisowski was awarded the Paul Hunter Scholarship, which would allow him to practise with professional players. At the time he was suffering from cancer and was in remission from Hodgkin lymphoma.

Overcoming his illness, Lisowski competed in the PIOS for the 2009/2010 season. He won the first and eighth event of the International Open Series, and finished first in the rankings, so he received a place on the 2010/2011 professional Main Tour.

=== 2010/2011 season ===
After a series of early exits from main tour events, he reached the final of Event 3 of the Players Tour Championship, winning six matches, including a 4–3 win over Mark Selby in the semi-final, where he came back from 1–3 down. In the final he lost 0–4 to Tom Ford. Lisowski qualified for the 2011 German Masters, the 2011 Welsh Open and the 2011 Players Tour Championship Grand Finals. At the end of his first professional season he climbed to 52nd in the world rankings, the highest of any of the debutants. Lisowski was awarded the Rookie of the Year Award at the World Snooker Annual Award Ceremony.

=== 2011/2012 season ===
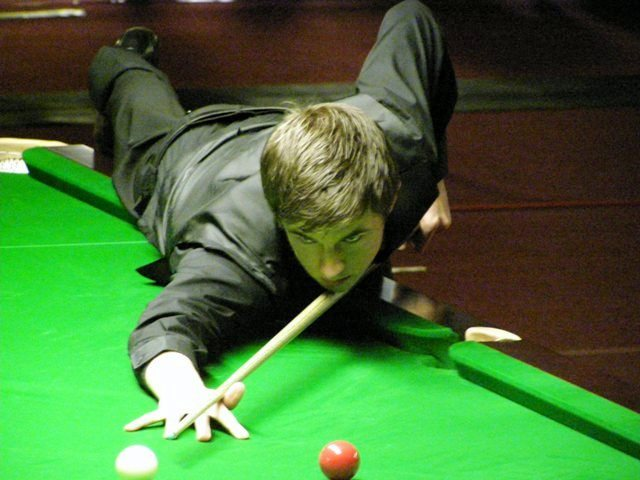
Lisowski in 2011

Lisowski had a very good season in the Players Tour Championship series of tournaments in the 2011/2012 season. He reached the quarter-finals of Event 6 and Event 9, and the semi-finals in Event 5, where he was knocked out by his compatriot and eventual winner, Andrew Higginson. The results ensured he finished 24th in the Order of Merit and therefore claimed the final spot for the 2012 Finals. He beat Barry Hawkins 4–3 to reach the last 16 of a ranking event for the first time in the Finals, before losing 1–4 to Neil Robertson.

Lisowski also qualified for the Shanghai Masters with wins over David Grace, Mike Dunn and Marco Fu, before defeating amateur Rouzi Maimaiti in the wildcard round. He played Jamie Cope in the round and was beaten 3–5. He only won one more match in his attempts to qualify for the remaining six ranking events, and finished the season ranked world number 40.

=== 2012/2013 season ===
The 2012/2013 season was a breakthrough year for Lisowski, as he qualified for five ranking tournaments, including the World Championship, and reached his second final as a professional. The first tournament he got to play in was the Australian Goldfields Open in Bendigo, by beating Dave Harold; he then lost 2–5 to Mark Davis in the first round. He could not qualify for the next two events, but then defeated Chen Zhe and Joe Perry to feature in the UK Championship for the first time. In his match against Chen, Lisowski made his first 147 in competitive play, but in the first round of the event, he lost 2–6 to Stuart Bingham. Lisowski beat Ian Burns and Jamie Burnett to qualify for the China Open, then saw off Zhou Yuelong to advance to the last 32. He played his good friend Judd Trump, and made a 131 break in a 5–3 win, then came back from 2–4 down to triumph 5–4 against Mark Davis, reaching his first ranking event quarter-final. However, in that match it was Lisowski who let a 4–2 lead slip, and lost 4–5 to Shaun Murphy, with Murphy stating that snooker had seen the future with Lisowski's performances during the week.

Lisowski played in nine minor-ranking Players Tour Championship events during the season, and reached the final in the first one by seeing off Trump in the quarter-finals, and Mark Williams in the semis. The final against Stephen Maguire went to a deciding frame with Lisowski missing a yellow off the spot, when requiring two further pots to leave his opponent needing snookers. After a brief safety exchange, Maguire potted the remaining colours to win the title. In the other PTC events, Lisowski's best results were three last 16 matches, which helped to cement his place in the Finals by finishing 13th on the Order of Merit. There he beat world number two Mark Selby 4–3 in the first round, before losing to Tom Ford in another deciding frame in the second round. In the World Championship Qualifying, he had comfortable 10–4 wins over James Wattana and Fergal O'Brien to reach the Crucible for the first time, where he played Barry Hawkins. The experience and composure of Hawkins told as he took the match 10–3, with Lisowski citing the intimate nature of playing at the Crucible, which affected his concentration, as a factor in the one-sided scoreline. He climbed five places in the world rankings during the season to finish at number 35, his highest position until that point.

=== 2013/2014 season ===
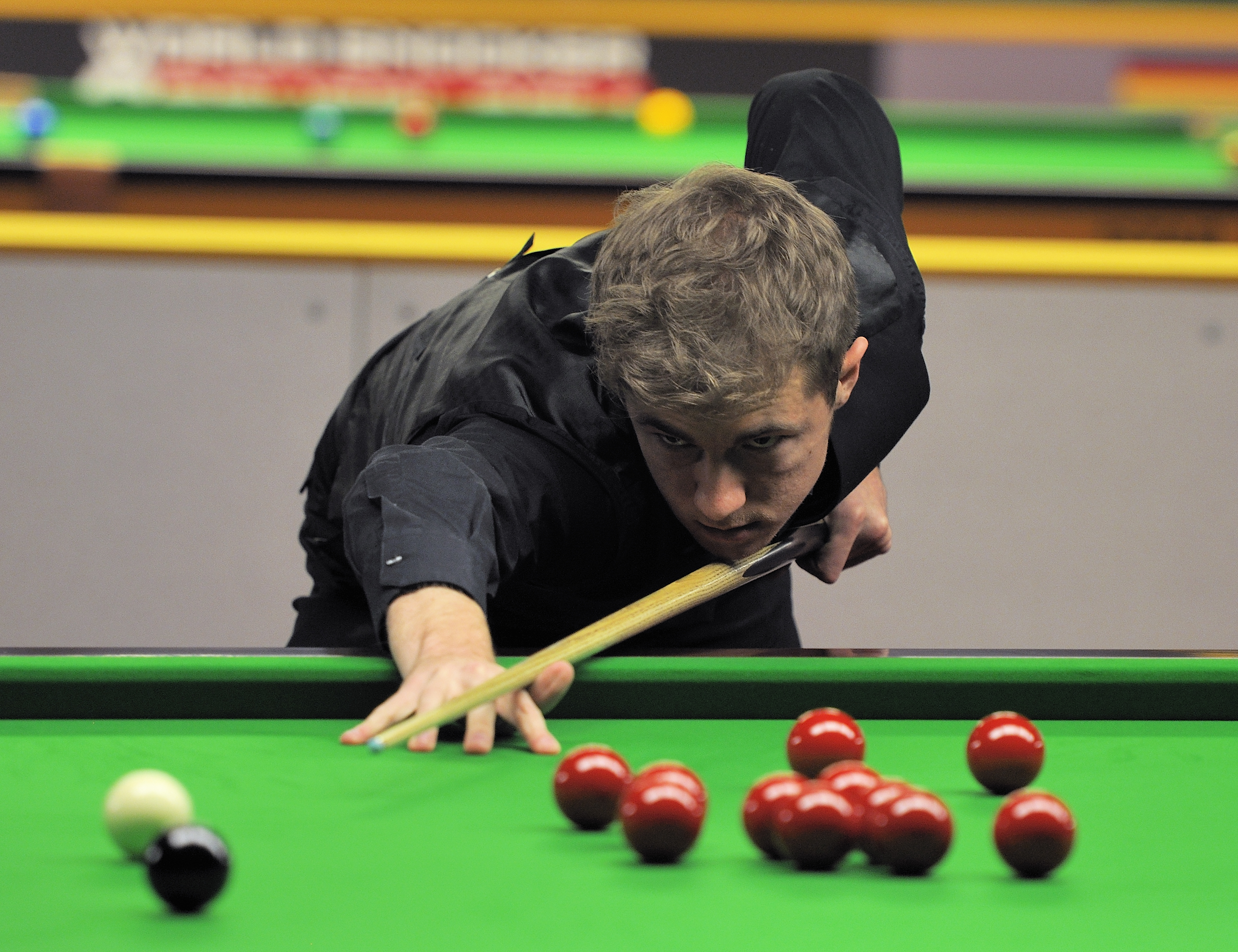
Lisowski at the 2014 German Masters

Lisowski began the 2013/2014 season by qualifying for the 2013 Wuxi Classic, where he whitewashed Tian Pengfei 5–0 in the first round, before being narrowly beaten 5–4 by Mark Williams in the second. At the European Tour event, the Antwerp Open, Lisowski won five matches to advance to the semi-finals, where he lost 4–2 to Mark Selby. He entered the UK Championship in good form and looked to be progressing into the second round, as he led Michael Leslie 4–0. However, Lisowski then conceded six frames in a row, to be beaten by the world number 94 in a performance he described as rubbish.

In following events, Alan McManus beat him 5–2 in the second round of the German Masters, but then Lisowski dropped just one frame in winning two matches to reach the third round of the Welsh Open. He built a 3–1 advantage over Barry Hawkins, before last year's World Championship runner-up made a century and two breaks over 50 to eliminate him 4–3. Lisowski also qualified for the China Open, but lost 5–3 against Dominic Dale in the first round.

=== 2014/2015 season ===
Lisowski won three matches to qualify for the Australian Goldfields Open, but lost 5–0 in an hour to Shaun Murphy in the first round. He defeated Lu Chenwei 5–2 in the Wuxi Classic, but was knocked out 5–2 by Zhao Xintong afterwards. Lisowski won a trio of matches for the second time this season to reach the Shanghai Masters, where Ding Junhui eliminated him 5–1 in the opening round. After Lisowski beat Chris Melling 6–1 at the UK Championship, he said that he was hoping to rediscover his confidence after having a quiet start to the year. He also revealed that he had turned to fellow player Robert Milkins for some guidance on his game. Lisowski raced into a 4–0 lead against practice partner Liang Wenbo in the second round and hung on to progress 6–4. Following his 6–4 loss to Murphy in the third round, Lisowski said that he was still adjusting to playing in the atmosphere of major events. He was beaten 4–3 in the first round of the Welsh Open, then came from 4–2 down to defeat Alan McManus 5–4 in the China Open, but he lost in the last 32 of a ranking event for the fifth time this season with a 5–0 defeat to Dechawat Poomjaeng. His ranking dropped 11 spots during the year to finish at 53rd in the world.

=== 2015/2016 season ===
For the second year in a row, Lisowski started the season with a trio of qualifying wins to reach the Australian Goldfields Open and, just as in the year before, he was whitewashed 5–0 in the first round, this time by Judd Trump. After beating Ali Carter 6–5 at the International Championship, he lost 6–3 to Marco Fu in the second round. Lisowski knocked out Zak Surety and Graeme Dott at the UK Championship, but bemoaned the fact that he could not translate that form to the main arena in the third round as he lost 6–4 to David Grace. He was narrowly defeated 4–3 in the second round of the Welsh Open by Martin Gould. An impressive 5–1 victory over Michael White saw Lisowski progress to the second round of the China Open, where he lost 5–2 to Stephen Maguire. Lisowski was beaten 10–7 by David Gilbert in the final World Championship qualifying round. His ranking increased by 14 spots over the course of the season to end up at 39th in the world.

=== 2016/2017 season ===
Lisowski progressed through to the last 16 of the Northern Ireland Open by defeating David Lilley 4–3, John Astley 4–1 and Joe Perry 4–3, but was thrashed 4–0 by Barry Hawkins. At the Gibraltar Open he beat Mark King 4–2, Anthony Hamilton 4–0 and Mark Allen 4–1 (whilst making the tournament's highest break of 145) to reach his second career ranking event quarter-final which he lost 4–1 to Judd Trump.

=== 2017/2018 season ===
This season could be seen as somewhat of a breakout for Lisowski, as his world ranking rose from 54th to 26th by the end of the season. He advanced to the quarter-finals in the English Open in October after his wins over Rory McLeod, Li Yuan, Mark Williams and Judd Trump, before losing 5–2 to the eventual champion Ronnie O'Sullivan. In November, Lisowski made his first career ranking event semi-final in the Shanghai Masters, which he lost 6–3 to Judd Trump. Later in the season Lisowski advanced to another ranking event quarter-final in the China Open in April, this time narrowly defeated 6–5 by Kyren Wilson. Lisowski appeared in the World Snooker Championship again since his debut in 2012/13, and secured his first ever win at the tournament by beating Stuart Bingham 10–7 in the first round, though he was thrashed by John Higgins 13–1 in the second round.

=== 2018/2019 season ===
Lisowski's stellar performance this season caught the attention of many. In July, he secured his first ranking final appearance in the Riga Masters by beating the likes of Graeme Dott and Stephen Maguire, but lost 5–2 to Neil Roberson in the final. He was quarter-finalist at the World Open, the European Masters, the Paul Hunter Classic and the Players Championship, made it to the semi-final of the International Championship, and he also qualified for The Masters for the first time, but was defeated 6–1 by Ding Junhui in the first round. And after being in the final of the non-ranking Championship League, Lisowski reached another ranking event final at the China Open in April, but was beaten by Neil Robertson again, this time losing 11–4.

=== 2019/2020 season ===
Lisowski performed consistently throughout 2019/2020, but he was unable to reach the same height as the season before. In September he made it to the quarter-finals of the 2019 Shanghai Masters, but was eliminated by Shaun Murphy by the scoreline of 6–1. In December, with wins over the likes of John Higgins, Thepchaiya Un-Nooh and Mark Allen, Lisowski reached his third ranking final at the 2019 Scottish Open, but lost 9–6 to Mark Selby.

=== 2020/2021 season ===
Lisowski made his fourth ranking final appearance at the World Grand Prix in December. He defeated Shaun Murphy, Robert Milkins, Zhao Xintong and Mark Selby to set up a meeting with Judd Trump in the final, calling his semi-final victory over Selby "the best performance of [my] career". Although Lisowski had moments of brilliance in the match, he eventually lost 7–10. In January, he reached the final of the German Masters but was defeated by Trump again, losing 2–9. In the Gibraltar Open final in March, he faced Trump once more and lost 0–4. He was in three quarter-finals too throughout the season, at the 2020 UK Championship, the 2021 Players Championship and the 2021 Tour Championship.

=== 2021/2022 season ===
As in the previous year, Lisowski made it to the quarter-final stage of the 2021 UK Championship, but was defeated 6–2 by Zhao Xintong. He also was a semi-finalist at the 2022 Welsh Open, but lost to Joe Perry 6–5.

At the end of the season, in the 2022 World Snooker Championship Lisowski wished to wear a badge with the flag of Ukraine on his waistcoat during his match against Matthew Stevens, in opposition to the Russian invasion of Ukraine, but the World Snooker Tour refused, stating that "our policy is to not allow our sport to be used as a political platform". Lisowski won the match 10–8. He stated afterwards that he had been playing fearfully at the end because he was "guarding the lead, which is the worst thing you can do".

In the next round, Lisowski defeated Neil Robertson 13–12 to reach the quarter-finals, his best performance to date in a World Championship. There he was beaten 13–12 by four-time champion John Higgins. He credited his improvement in performance to the influence of mentor Peter Ebdon, who he began working with in late 2021. On 29 April Lisowski joined the team in the BBC studio for analysis of the semi-final match between Judd Trump and Mark Williams.

=== 2022/2023 season ===
In November, at the 2022 UK Championship Lisowski reached the semi-final, but lost 6–5 to Mark Allen. At the start of the second half of the season, he made it to the semi-finals of the 2023 Masters as well, but there he was whitewashed 6–0 by Mark Williams. In the next tournament, the 2023 World Grand Prix he once again lost in a decider to Mark Allen, at the quarter-final stage by the scoreline of 5–4. Lisowski was semi-finalist once more at the 2023 German Masters, and was defeated yet again 6–5 in a decider, this time by Tom Ford.

=== 2023/2024 season ===
In the first half of the season, Lisowski reached the quarter-final stage of the 2023 British Open, where he got edged out 4–5 by Mark Selby, then at the 2023 Northern Ireland Open, in a run that saw him dropping only one frame in each of his matches, he made it to the semi-finals. However, that match ended with him winning only one frame, as he was beaten 1–6 by Chris Wakelin. At the end of the calendar year, Lisowski participated in the second of two exhibition events held in Macau, China, reaching the final, but despite making a maximum break during the match, he lost 6–9 to Mark Williams. In January, he won his first match against reigning world champion Luca Brecel 6–2 to make it to the quarter-final stage of the 2024 Masters, but there he lost 3–6 to Shaun Murphy. At the end of the season, for the first time since 2018, Lisowski had to qualify for the 2024 World Championship as he dropped out of the top 16 due to his poor performance throughout the snooker year. He did reach the main stage at the Crucible, but after a 10–9 victory over Ding Junhui, he exited the tournament in the second round, as he lost 11–13 to Stuart Bingham.

=== 2024/2025 season ===
At the 2024 UK Championship, Lisowski defeated Mark Selby 6–4 in the first round, having trailed by three frames earlier in the match. He went on to reach the quarter-final, where he was beaten by Mark Allen 3‍–‍6. Lisowski failed to qualify for the 2025 World Championship, losing in qualifying to Zak Surety.

=== 2025/2026 season ===
In October 2025, Lisowski secured his maiden ranking event victory, triumphing in the final of the Northern Ireland Open 9–8 against Trump. Prior to the match, Lisowski had lost his six previous ranking event finals. At the 2026 Welsh Open, he was defeated by Hawkins 5–9 in the final. Lisowski failed to qualify for the 2026 World Championship after suffering a 5–10 defeat to He Guoqiang in the qualifiers.

== Personal life ==
Lisowski was born in Cheltenham, Gloucestershire. He attended Chosen Hill School in Churchdown, Gloucestershire. In 2008, aged 16, he was diagnosed with Hodgkin lymphoma.

Lisowski married former partner Jamie in Cheltenham in February 2015. They amicably divorced after five years of marriage.

In March 2025, Lisowski withdrew from the World Grand Prix in Hong Kong following the sudden death of his father. He had been scheduled to face Judd Trump in the last 16, but pulled out for personal reasons and later paid tribute to his father on a post shared on Instagram.

Lisowski is one-quarter Ukrainian; his grandfather was a Ukrainian displaced person who settled in England at the end of World War II. During the 2022 World Snooker Championship, Lisowski wished to wear a Ukrainian flag badge on his waistcoat to express support for the country after the Russian invasion of Ukraine. However, this was disallowed by the tournament organisers.

In 2009, he said his favourite male sports star was Tiger Woods, while Serena Williams was his favourite female. He is best friends with Judd Trump. In 2020, Lisowski made a cameo appearance along with Ken Doherty and Liang Wenbo in the snooker movie Break.

== Performance and rankings timeline ==
Tournaments	2010/ 11	2011/ 12	2012/ 13	2013/ 14	2014/ 15	2015/ 16	2016/ 17	2017/ 18	2018/ 19	2019/ 20		2020/ 21	2021/ 22	2022/ 23	2023/ 24	2024/ 25	2025/ 26	2026/ 27
Rankings (Note: It shows the ranking at the beginning of the season)	(Note: New players on the Main Tour don't have a ranking)	52	40	35	42	53	39	54	26	11		14	14	10	13	19	25	17
Ranking tournaments
Championship League	Non-Ranking Event											RR	A	RR	A	2R	2R	2R
China Open	LQ	LQ	QF	1R	2R	2R	LQ	QF	F	Tournament Not Held								LQ
Wuhan Open	Tournament Not Held														3R	QF	2R	LQ
British Open	Tournament Not Held												1R	3R	QF	LQ	1R	QF
English Open	Tournament Not Held						1R	QF	3R	3R		2R	LQ	2R	1R	1R	3R	1R
Shenzhen Open (Note: The event was called the Xi'an Grand Prix (2024/2025–2025/2026))	Tournament Not Held															2R	LQ	LQ
Northern Ireland Open	Tournament Not Held						4R	2R	3R	1R		1R	2R	LQ	SF	1R	W	2R
International Championship	Not Held		LQ	1R	LQ	2R	LQ	3R	SF	1R		Not Held			2R	3R	3R	LQ
UK Championship	LQ	LQ	1R	1R	3R	3R	1R	2R	4R	3R		QF	QF	SF	1R	QF	LQ	
Shoot Out	Non-Ranking Event						4R	1R	A	3R		1R	2R	4R	A	1R	A	
Scottish Open	Not Held		MR	Not Held			1R	1R	2R	F		2R	LQ	3R	1R	3R	1R	
German Masters	1R	LQ	LQ	2R	LQ	LQ	LQ	1R	1R	LQ		F	LQ	SF	LQ	1R	1R	
Welsh Open	1R	LQ	LQ	3R	1R	2R	1R	3R	4R	3R		4R	SF	3R	2R	QF	F	
World Grand Prix	Tournament Not Held				NR	DNQ	DNQ	2R	1R	1R		F	2R	QF	1R	2R	1R	
Players Championship (Note: The event was called the Players Tour Championship Grand Final (2010/2011–2015/2016))	1R	2R	2R	DNQ	DNQ	DNQ	DNQ	DNQ	QF	DNQ		QF	DNQ	1R	DNQ	DNQ	1R	
World Open	LQ	LQ	LQ	LQ	Not Held		LQ	1R	QF	3R		Not Held			LQ	2R	2R	
Tour Championship	Tournament Not Held								DNQ	DNQ		QF	DNQ	DNQ	DNQ	DNQ	DNQ	
World Championship	LQ	LQ	1R	LQ	LQ	LQ	LQ	2R	1R	1R		2R	QF	2R	2R	LQ	LQ	
Non-ranking Tournaments
Shanghai Masters	Ranking Event								A	QF		Not Held			2R	A	A	2R
Champion of Champions	Not Held			A	A	A	A	A	A	A		A	A	A	A	A	1R	
The Masters	A	A	A	A	A	A	A	A	1R	1R		WD	1R	SF	QF	A	A	
Championship League	A	A	A	A	A	A	A	A	F	RR	RR	RR	RR	2R	WD	RR	RR	
Former ranking tournaments
Wuxi Classic	Non-Ranking		LQ	2R	2R	Tournament Not Held												
Australian Goldfields Open	NH	LQ	1R	A	1R	1R	Tournament Not Held											
Shanghai Masters	LQ	1R	LQ	LQ	1R	LQ	LQ	SF	Non-Ranking			Not Held			Non-Ranking Event			
Paul Hunter Classic	Minor-Ranking Event						3R	2R	QF	NR		Tournament Not Held						
Indian Open	Not Held			LQ	LQ	NH	1R	1R	1R	Tournament Not Held								
Riga Masters (Note: The event was called the Riga Open (2014/2015–2015/2016))	Tournament Not Held				Minor-Rank		2R	3R	F	3R		Tournament Not Held						
China Championship	Tournament Not Held						NR	LQ	2R	2R		Tournament Not Held						
WST Pro Series	Tournament Not Held											3R	Tournament Not Held					
Turkish Masters	Tournament Not Held												2R	Tournament Not Held				
Gibraltar Open	Tournament Not Held					MR	QF	4R	2R	3R		F	3R	Tournament Not Held				
WST Classic	Tournament Not Held													2R	Tournament Not Held			
European Masters	Tournament Not Held						LQ	3R	QF	LQ		2R	1R	2R	1R	Not Held		
Saudi Arabia Masters	Tournament Not Held															6R	4R	NH
Former non-ranking tournaments
Shoot Out	A	1R	3R	1R	1R	3R	Ranking Event											

Performance Table Legend
LQ	lost in the qualifying draw	#R	lost in the early rounds of the tournament (WR = Wildcard round, RR = Round robin)	QF	lost in the quarter-finals
SF	lost in the semi-finals	F	lost in the final	W	won the tournament
DNQ	did not qualify for the tournament	A	did not participate in the tournament	WD	withdrew from the tournament

NH / Not Held	means an event was not held.
NR / Non-Ranking Event	means an event is/was no longer a ranking event.
R / Ranking Event	means an event is/was a ranking event.
MR / Minor-Ranking Event	means an event is/was a minor-ranking event.

== Career finals ==
=== Ranking finals: 8 (1 title) ===
Outcome	No.	Year	Championship	Opponent in the final	Score
Runner-up	1.	2018	Riga Masters	(Australia) Neil Robertson	2–5
Runner-up	2.	2019	China Open	(Australia) Neil Robertson	4–11
Runner-up	3.	2019	Scottish Open	(England) Mark Selby	6–9
Runner-up	4.	2020	World Grand Prix	(England) Judd Trump	7–10
Runner-up	5.	2021	German Masters	(England) Judd Trump	2–9
Runner-up	6.	2021	Gibraltar Open	(England) Judd Trump	0–4
Winner	1.	2025	Northern Ireland Open	(England) Judd Trump	9–8
Runner-up	7.	2026	Welsh Open	(England) Barry Hawkins	5–9

=== Minor-ranking finals: 2 ===
Outcome	No.	Year	Championship	Opponent in the final	Score
Runner-up	1.	2010	Players Tour Championship – Event 3	(England) Tom Ford	0–4
Runner-up	2.	2012	Players Tour Championship – Event 1	(Scotland) Stephen Maguire	3–4

=== Non-ranking finals: 1 ===
Outcome	No.	Year	Championship	Opponent in the final	Score
Runner-up	1.	2019	Championship League	(England) Martin Gould	1–3

=== Amateur finals: 5 (3 titles) ===
Outcome	No.	Year	Championship	Opponent in the final	Score
Runner-up	1.	2007	Junior Pot Black	(England) Mitchell Mann	0–1
Runner-up	2.	2009	PIOS – Event 6	(China) Xiao Guodong	0–6
Winner	1.	2009	PIOS – Event 1	(England) Liam Highfield	6–5
Winner	2.	2010	English Amateur Championship	(Republic of Ireland) Leo Fernandez	9–2
Winner	3.	2010	PIOS – Event 8	(England) Justin Astley	6–1
