= Ian Glover =

English snooker player

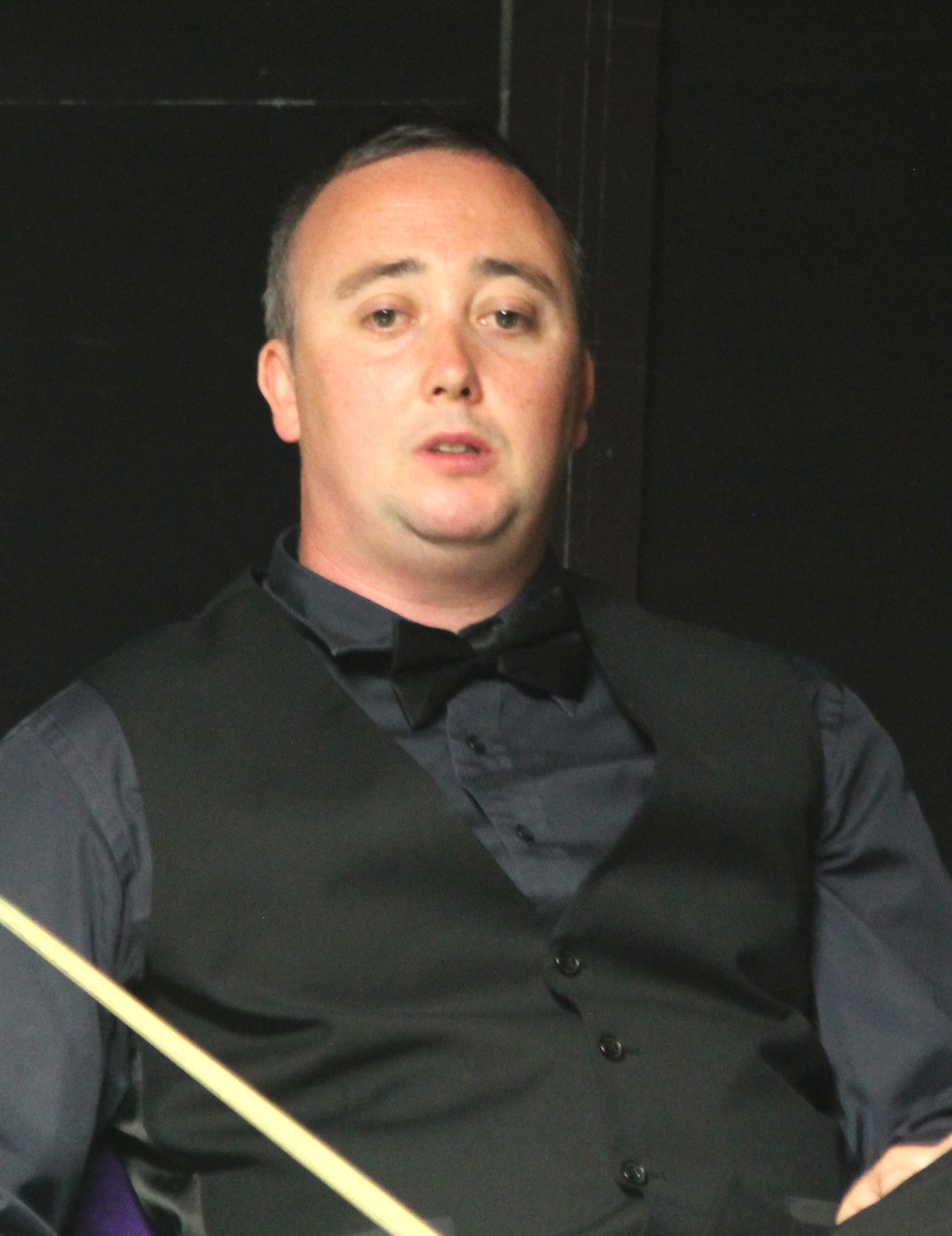
- Paul Hunter Classic 2016

Personal information
- Born: 8 November 1978 (age 47) Doncaster, England

Sport
- Country: England
- Sport: Snooker
- Professional: 1995–1997, 1998/1999, 2014–2016
- Highest ranking: 90 (July–August 2015)

Ian Glover (born 8 November 1978) is a former professional snooker player from Doncaster. He practises at the Jeff Cundy snooker centre in Scunthorpe and the Sheffield Star Snooker Academy. His practice partners are the club's owner Jeff Cundy, retired professional Barry West, Ben Woollaston and Stuart Carrington.

== Career ==
Glover first entered Main Tour for the 1995–96 season for the first of three seasons in the 1990s. After dropping off the tour in 1999, Glover took a hiatus from 2001 before returning to snooker in 2009, playing the secondary Pontins International Open Series tour, Glover finished the season 43rd in the Order of Merit with his best result being a quarter final defeat to Alfie Burden in the second event. Glover reached the last 16 of the 2009 Six-red World Championship, with a 5–4 win over Ricky Walden in the last 32.

For 2010–11, the PIOS was dropped and replaced by the pro-am Players Tour Championship and Glover enjoyed success in these events, with wins over former two times World Champion Mark Williams and top 32 player Marcus Campbell, wins which helped him reach the last 64 stage of Event 3 and last 32 of Event 4 respectively; however, these runs were not enough to earn him a place back on the professional tour at the end of the season and he failed to win place through the 2011 Q School also. He qualified for the main qualifying stages of the 2010 World Open. He lost 3–1 to Anthony McGill in the first qualifying round.

From 2011 to 2014 Glover continued to enter PTC events but failed to advance beyond the last 128 stage and failed to win prize money. Glover however did return to the tour in 2014 for the 2014–15 and 2015–16 seasons after winning a two-year card in the EBSA Play-offs beating Gareth Allen and Jamie Clarke both 4–2.

In the 2014/15 season Glover twice reached the last 32 of the PTC events (AT1 and ET1); however, in the major tournaments he failed to win a single match.

Glover began the 2015/2016 season positively, with a 5–0 victory over promising amateur Ross Higgins in the Australian Open, but lost in the next qualifying round 3–5 to Kyren Wilson. He overcame another amateur, Xu Yuan, in the Haining Open, but followed this 4–2 win with a loss to Thanawat Thirapongpaiboon in the last 64. At the UK Championship, he led Jamie Jones 4–3, but could not prevent a 4–6 defeat; his 2016 German Masters qualifying campaign ended similarly, Glover taking the first frame but losing 1–5 to the resurgent John Higgins.

== Performance and rankings timeline ==
Tournament	1995/ 96	1996/ 97	1998/ 99	1999/ 00	2000/ 01	2010/ 11	2011/ 12	2012/ 13	2013/ 14	2014/ 15	2015/ 16	2016/ 17
Ranking (Note: From the 2010/2011 season it shows the ranking at the beginning of the season.)	(Note: New players don't have a ranking.)	421		(Note: He was an amateur.)							115	
Ranking tournaments
Indian Open	Tournament Not Held								A	LQ	NH	A
World Open (Note: The event run under different name as Grand Prix (1995/1996–2000/2001))	LQ	LQ	A	A	A	LQ	A	A	A	Not held		A
Paul Hunter Classic	Tournament Not Held					Minor-Ranking						2R
Shanghai Masters	Not Held					A	A	A	A	LQ	LQ	A
European Masters	LQ	LQ	A	A	A	Not Held						A
International Championship	Not held							A	A	LQ	LQ	A
UK Championship	LQ	LQ	A	A	A	A	A	A	A	1R	1R	A
German Masters (Note: The event run under different name as German Open (1995/1996–1996/1997))	LQ	LQ	NR	Not held		A	A	A	A	LQ	LQ	A
Welsh Open	LQ	LQ	A	A	A	A	A	A	A	1R	1R	A
Gibraltar Open	Tournament Not Held										MR	LQ
Players Championship Grand Final (Note: The event run under different name as Players Tour Championship Grand Finals (2010/2011–2012/2013))	Not Held					DNQ	DNQ	DNQ	DNQ	DNQ	DNQ	DNQ
China Open (Note: The event run under different name as China International (1998/1999))	Not Held		A	A	A	A	A	A	A	LQ	LQ	A
World Championship	LQ	LQ	LQ	A	A	A	A	A	A	LQ	LQ	A
Non-ranking tournaments
The Masters	A	LQ	LQ	LQ	LQ	A	A	A	A	A	A	A
Former ranking tournaments
Asian Classic (Note: The event run under different name Thailand Classic (1995/1996))	LQ	LQ	Not Held									
Thailand Open	LQ	LQ	A	A	A	Not Held						
International Open	LQ	LQ	A	A	A	Not Held		MR	Not Held			
British Open	LQ	LQ	A	A	A	Not Held						
Wuxi Classic	Not held					Non-ranking		A	A	LQ	Not Held	
Australian Goldfields Open (Note: The event run under different name as Australian Masters (1995/1996))	NR	Not held					A	A	A	LQ	LQ	NH

Performance Table Legend
LQ	lost in the qualifying draw	#R	lost in the early rounds of the tournament (WR = Wildcard round, RR = Round robin)	QF	lost in the quarter-finals
SF	lost in the semi-finals	F	lost in the final	W	won the tournament
DNQ	did not qualify for the tournament	A	did not participate in the tournament	WD	withdrew from the tournament
DQ	disqualified from the tournament				

NH / Not Held	event was not held.
NR / Non-Ranking Event	event is/was no longer a ranking event.
R / Ranking Event	event is/was a ranking event.
MR / Minor-Ranking Event	event is/was a minor-ranking event.
