= David Grace (snooker player) =

English snooker player (born 1985)

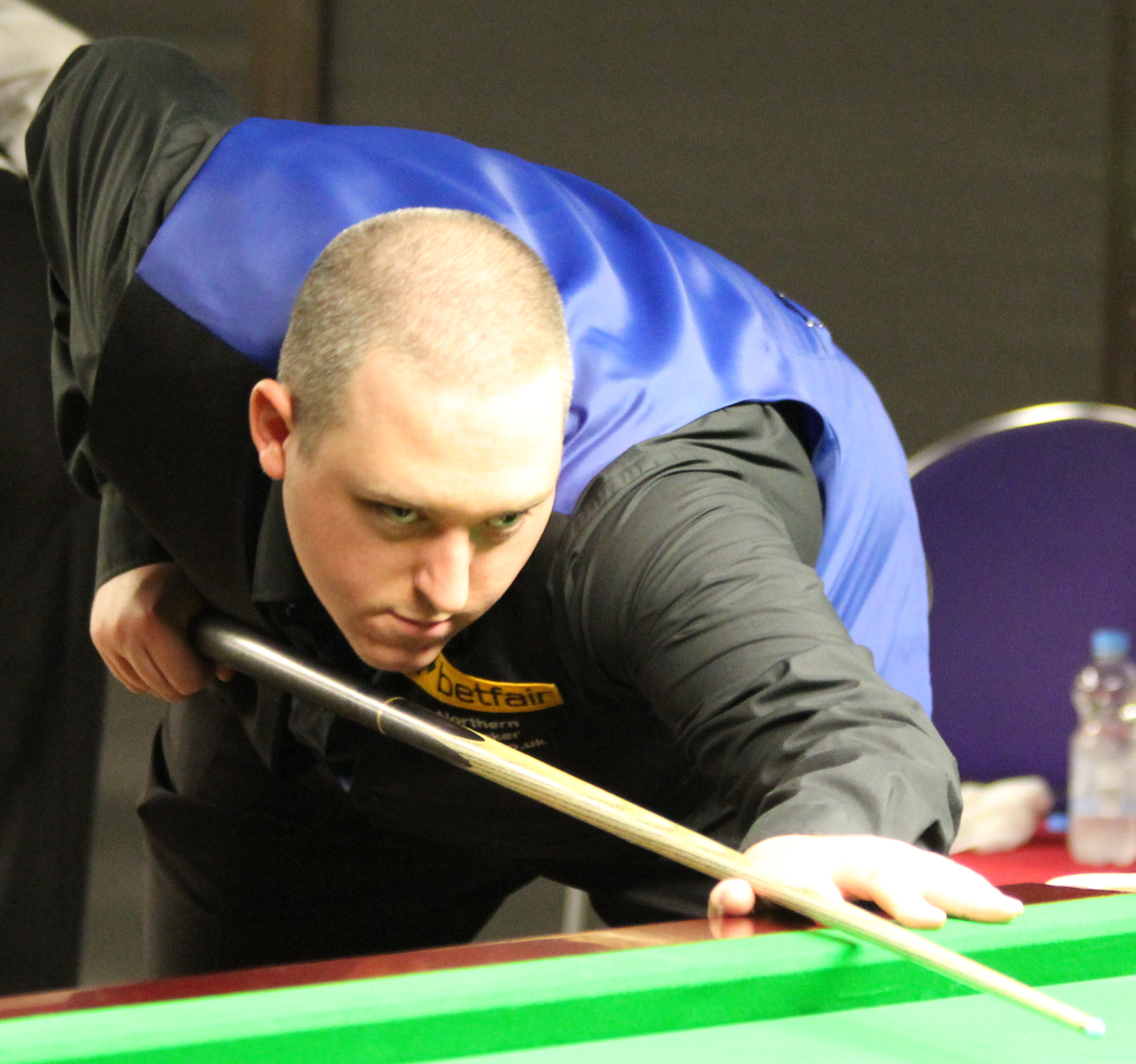
- Paul Hunter Classic 2012

Personal information
- Nickname: Amazing
- Born: 5 May 1985 (age 41) Bradford, England

Sport
- Country: England
- Sport: Snooker
- Professional: 2008/2009, 2011–2018, 2019–present
- Highest ranking: 43 (August 2017)
- Current ranking: 73 (as of 7 November 2026)
- Best ranking finish: Semi-final (x2)
Medal record
Men's snooker
Representing Great Britain
World Games
Silver medal – second place	2009 Kaohsiung	Individual

David Grace (born 5 May 1985) is an English professional snooker player and painter. After being a successful junior and amateur player, notably winning the English Amateur Championship in 2005 and 2008, he became a professional in 2008, gaining his place by winning the 2008 European Snooker Championships, where he beat Craig Steadman in the final.

In 2009, Grace took part in the men's singles snooker competition at the World Games in Kaohsiung, finishing as the runner-up in this event, winning the silver medal. He entered the 2015 UK Championship as the world number 81, but progressed through to his first ranking event semi-final which he lost 6–4 to Liang Wenbo. Grace fell off the tour in 2018, but regained his place on the tour in 2019 after finishing in the top two on the 2018–19 Challenge Tour ranking list. This earned him a two-year card for the 2019/2020 and 2020/2021 seasons.

== Career ==
=== 2011/2012 season ===
As a new player on the tour Grace would need to win four qualifying matches in order to reach the main draw of the ranking events. He failed to win more than one match in each of his first six attempts to do this until he played in the qualifying for the China Open. There he beat Daniel Wells, Barry Pinches and Matthew Selt, before losing 4–5 to Tom Ford in the final round.

Grace played in all 12 of the minor-ranking Players Tour Championship events throughout the season, with his best finishes coming in Event 10 and Event 12, where he reached the last 16. He was ranked 63rd in the PTC Order of Merit. Grace ended the season ranked world number 77 and would ordinarily be relegated from the snooker tour as he did not finish in the top 64 who retain their places. However, due to his performances in the PTC events, he earned his place for the 2012–13 season.

=== 2012/2013 season ===
Grace reached the final round of qualifying for the 2012 Shanghai Masters after seeing off Michael Leslie, Li Yan and Xiao Guodong, but was edged out 4–5 by former world champion Peter Ebdon just one match away from reaching the main stage of a ranking event for the first time. He played in all ten Players Tour Championship events this season, where he enjoyed his best result in the PTC Event 1 by beating James Gillespie, Jimmy White and Gareth Allen, before losing to Jack Lisowski. Grace was placed 74th on the PTC Order of Merit. His season ended when he was beaten 9–10 by Craig Steadman in the first round of World Championship Qualifying. Grace fell 11 places in the rankings during the year to finish it world number 88.

=== 2013/2014 season ===
Grace went one better than last season in the qualifying rounds of the 2013 Shanghai Masters by winning four matches, concluding with a 5–2 victory over Tom Ford, to reach the main stage of a ranking event for the first time in his career where he was whitewashed 5–0 by Barry Hawkins. He lost his first match in all eight remaining ranking events after this. Grace also had his best form in the early part of the season in the European Tour events by reaching the last 16 of the second event, the Rotterdam Open, where he was beaten 4–1 by Mark Davis. This helped him to finish 53rd on the Order of Merit, which saw Grace earn a fresh two-year place on the tour for the 2014–15 and 2015–16 seasons.

=== 2014/2015 season ===
At the minor-ranking Yixing Open, Grace won three matches to reach the last 16 where he was whitewashed 4–0 by Ryan Day. Grace qualified for the first ranking event of the 2014–15 season, the Wuxi Classic by beating Jimmy Robertson 5–4, but he lost 5–1 to Judd Trump. This last 64 appearance proved to be his best result in a ranking event this year.

=== 2015/2016 season ===
In the qualifying rounds for the 2015 Shanghai Masters, Grace beat Joe O'Connor 5–3, Thepchaiya Un-Nooh 5–2 and Cao Yupeng 5–4 to reach the final round. He faced Ali Carter and defeated him 5–3, a victory he described as the best of his career afterwards. Grace was due to play Mark Selby in the first round, but he received a bye after Selby withdrew due to family bereavement. In the second round Grace was knocked out 5–1 by Mark Allen. At the UK Championship, Grace defeated Andrew Higginson 6–1, Robert Milkins 6–2, Jack Lisowski 6–4 and Peter Ebdon 6–2 to reach the quarter-finals of a ranking event for the first time in his career. He fell 5–1 down to Martin Gould, but remarkably won five successive frames to eliminate him 6–5. In the semi-finals, Grace built a 4–2 advantage over Liang Wenbo, but saw it erased to be 5–4 behind. He then missed a simple pink in the next frame which would have taken the match to a decider, stating afterwards that he had twitched on it. Despite this, Grace earned £30,000 for his first last four showing after he had made £13,000 in the previous two seasons. His form continued into the Gibraltar Open where he won four matches to meet Liang in the quarter-finals and was beaten 4–1. However, Grace could only win two out of nine matches during the rest of the season which included making his debut at the World Grand Prix (lost 4–2 to Mark Allen in the first round). Grace finished a season inside the top 64 in the world rankings for the first time as he was 60th.

=== 2016/2017 season ===
At the Paul Hunter Classic, Grace beat Sean O'Sullivan 4–0 and Matthew Stevens 4–3 and then did not drop a frame in eliminating Jack Lisowski and Robbie Williams. This saw him play in his second career ranking event quarter-final in which he led Thepchaiya Un-Nooh 3–1, but lost 4–3. Grace was beaten 4–1 by Barry Hawkins in the third round of the English Open and lost in the quarter-finals of the Shoot-Out to Shaun Murphy.

Grace then qualified for his first World Championship by overcoming Thor Chuan Leong 10–6, Mark Joyce 10–6 and Akani Songsermsawad 10–3 and played Kyren Wilson in the first round. Grace only trailed 5–4 at the end of the first session after being 5–1 down and then made a century to be 7–6 behind. However, Wilson then took three successive frames to win 10–6. His end-of-year ranking of 44 is the highest Grace has ever been.

=== 2017/18 season ===
He dropped off the tour at the end of the 2017/18 season but entered Q School in an attempt to win back a place. However, his bid to regain professional status ended unsuccessfully, as he lost in all three 2018 Q School events.

== Personal life ==
Grace also works at the Northern Snooker Centre and sells his own portrait paintings of snooker players.

== Performance and rankings timeline ==
Tournament	2008/ 09	2010/ 11	2011/ 12	2012/ 13	2013/ 14	2014/ 15	2015/ 16	2016/ 17	2017/ 18	2018/ 19	2019/ 20	2020/ 21	2021/ 22	2022/ 23	2023/ 24	2024/ 25	2025/ 26	2026/ 27
Ranking (Note: It shows the ranking at the beginning of the season)	(Note: New players on the Main Tour don't have a ranking)	(Note: He was an amateur)		(Note: Players qualified through Players Tour Championship Order of Merit started the season without ranking points)	88	(Note: Players qualified through European Tour Order of Merit started the season without prize money ranking points)	111	60	44			69	58	55	54	61	(Note: Players qualified through the Q School started the season without ranking points)	74
Ranking tournaments
Championship League	Non-Ranking Event											RR	RR	RR	RR	RR	RR	2R
China Open	LQ	A	LQ	LQ	1R	LQ	1R	LQ	LQ	A	Tournament Not Held							LQ
Wuhan Open	Tournament Not Held														LQ	LQ	2R	LQ
British Open	Tournament Not Held												2R	1R	1R	2R	LQ	2R
English Open	Tournament Not Held							3R	1R	A	1R	3R	LQ	LQ	1R	1R	LQ	1R
Shenzhen Open (Note: The event was called the Xi'an Grand Prix (2024/2025–2025/2026))	Tournament Not Held															LQ	1R	1R
Northern Ireland Open	Tournament Not Held							1R	1R	A	1R	SF	1R	2R	LQ	1R	2R	LQ
International Championship	Not Held			LQ	LQ	LQ	LQ	1R	1R	A	1R	Not Held			1R	1R	LQ	1R
UK Championship	LQ	A	LQ	LQ	1R	1R	SF	1R	1R	A	2R	3R	2R	LQ	LQ	LQ	LQ	LQ
Shoot Out	NH	Non-Ranking Event						QF	1R	A	1R	3R	WD	4R	1R	1R	2R	
Scottish Open	Not Held			MR	Not Held			1R	4R	A	2R	1R	LQ	LQ	LQ	1R	1R	LQ
German Masters	NH	A	LQ	LQ	LQ	LQ	LQ	LQ	LQ	A	1R	LQ	LQ	LQ	LQ	1R	WD	
Welsh Open	LQ	A	LQ	LQ	1R	1R	1R	1R	3R	A	1R	2R	LQ	LQ	WD	LQ	3R	
World Grand Prix	Tournament Not Held					NR	1R	DNQ	DNQ	DNQ	DNQ	1R	DNQ	DNQ	DNQ	DNQ	DNQ	
Players Championship (Note: The event was called the Players Tour Championship Grand Final (2010/2011–2015/2016))	NH	DNQ	DNQ	DNQ	DNQ	DNQ	DNQ	DNQ	DNQ	DNQ	DNQ	DNQ	DNQ	DNQ	DNQ	DNQ	DNQ	
World Open (Note: The event was called the Grand Prix (2008/2009))	LQ	A	LQ	LQ	LQ	Not Held		1R	LQ	A	LQ	Not Held			1R	LQ	1R	
Tour Championship	Tournament Not Held									DNQ	DNQ	DNQ	DNQ	DNQ	DNQ	DNQ	DNQ	
World Championship	LQ	A	LQ	LQ	LQ	LQ	LQ	1R	LQ	LQ	LQ	LQ	LQ	1R	LQ	LQ	LQ	
Non-ranking tournaments
The Masters	LQ	A	A	A	A	A	A	A	A	A	A	A	A	A	A	A	A	
Championship League	A	A	A	A	A	A	A	A	A	A	RR	A	A	A	A	A	A	
Former ranking tournaments
Northern Ireland Trophy	LQ	Tournament Not Held																
Bahrain Championship	LQ	Tournament Not Held																
Wuxi Classic	Non-Ranking			LQ	LQ	1R	Tournament Not Held											
Australian Goldfields Open	Not Held		LQ	LQ	LQ	LQ	LQ	Tournament Not Held										
Shanghai Masters	LQ	A	LQ	LQ	1R	LQ	2R	A	LQ	Non-Ranking		Not Held			Non-Ranking Event			
Paul Hunter Classic	PA	Minor-Ranking Event						QF	2R	1R	NR	Tournament Not Held						
Indian Open	Tournament Not Held				A	LQ	NH	1R	LQ	A	Tournament Not Held							
Riga Masters (Note: The event was called the Riga Open (2014/2015–2015/2016))	Tournament Not Held					MR		LQ	LQ	A	1R	Tournament Not Held						
China Championship	Tournament Not Held							NR	2R	A	LQ	Tournament Not Held						
WST Pro Series	Tournament Not Held											RR	Tournament Not Held					
Turkish Masters	Tournament Not Held												1R	Tournament Not Held				
Gibraltar Open	Tournament Not Held						MR	1R	2R	4R	QF	1R	1R	Tournament Not Held				
WST Classic	Tournament Not Held													4R	Tournament Not Held			
European Masters	Tournament Not Held							1R	LQ	A	LQ	2R	LQ	3R	LQ	Not Held		
Saudi Arabia Masters	Tournament Not Held															2R	2R	NH
Former non-ranking tournaments
Masters Qualifying Event	1R	Tournament Not Held																
Six-red World Championship	LQ	LQ	NH	LQ	LQ	LQ	LQ	LQ	LQ	LQ	LQ	Not Held		LQ	Tournament Not Held			
Haining Open	Tournament Not Held					MR		2R	A	A	A	NH	A	A	Tournament Not Held			

Performance Table Legend
LQ	lost in the qualifying draw	#R	lost in the early rounds of the tournament (WR = Wildcard round, RR = Round robin)	QF	lost in the quarter-finals
SF	lost in the semi-finals	F	lost in the final	W	won the tournament
DNQ	did not qualify for the tournament	A	did not participate in the tournament	WD	withdrew from the tournament

NH / Not Held	means an event was not held.
NR / Non-Ranking Event	means an event is/was no longer a ranking event.
R / Ranking Event	means an event is/was a ranking event.
MR / Minor-Ranking Event	means an event is/was a minor-ranking event.
PA / Pro-am Event	means an event is/was a pro-am event.

== Career finals ==
=== Non-ranking finals: 1 ===
Outcome	No.	Year	Championship	Opponent	Score
Runner-up	1.	2009	World Games	(England) Nigel Bond	0–3

=== Pro-am finals: 3 (2 titles) ===
Outcome	No.	Year	Championship	Opponent	Score
Winner	1.	2008	Pontins Spring Open	(England) Nigel Bond	5–1
Runner-up	1.	2016	Pink Ribbon	(Wales) Jamie Jones	3–4
Winner	2.	2017	Vienna Snooker Open	(England) Nigel Bond	5–2

=== Amateur finals: 5 (5 titles) ===
Outcome	No.	Year	Championship	Opponent	Score
Winner	1.	2005	English Amateur Championship	(England) Andy Symons-Rowe	8–3
Winner	2.	2008	English Amateur Championship (2)	(England) Ben Hancorn	9–7
Winner	3.	2008	EBSA European Snooker Championships	(England) Craig Steadman	7–6
Winner	4.	2018	Challenge Tour – Event 2	(England) Mitchell Mann	3–0
Winner	5.	2018	Challenge Tour – Event 6	(England) Ben Hancorn	3–0
