= 2015 Champion of Champions =

2015 188BET Champion of Champions
Tournament information
- Dates: 10–15 November 2015
- Venue: Ricoh Arena
- City: Coventry
- Country: England
- Organisation: Matchroom Sport
- Format: Non-ranking event
- Total prize fund: £300,000
- Winner's share: £100,000
- Highest break: Neil Robertson (AUS) (144)

Final
- Champion: Neil Robertson (AUS)
- Runner-up: Mark Allen (NIR)
- Score: 10–5

The 2015 Champion of Champions (officially the 2015 188BET Champion of Champions) was a professional non-ranking snooker tournament that took place between 10 and 15 November 2015 at the Ricoh Arena in Coventry, England. It was the third staging of the tournament since it was revived in 2013. In the United Kingdom, the tournament was broadcast on ITV4.

Ronnie O'Sullivan, who won the title in 2013 and 2014, chose not to defend his title in 2015.

Neil Robertson won the tournament, defeating Mark Allen 10–5 in the final.

== Prize fund ==
The breakdown of prize money for 2015 is shown below:

- Winner: £100,000
- Runner-up: £50,000
- Losing Semi-finalist: £25,000
- Group runner-up: £10,000
- First round losers: £7,500
- Total: £300,000

== Players ==
Players qualified for the event by winning important tournaments since the previous Champion of Champions. Entry was guaranteed for the defending champion, winners of rankings events and winners the following non-rankings events: 2015 Masters, 2015 Championship League, 2015 World Grand Prix and 2015 World Cup. Remaining places were then allocated to winners of European Tour events (in the order they were played) and then, if required, to winners of Asian Tour events and then, winners of the 2015 Six-red World Championship, 2015 Snooker Shoot-Out and 2015 World Seniors Championship.

The following players qualified for the tournament:

Seed	Player	Qualified as	Ref.
w/d	(England) Ronnie O'Sullivan	Winner of 2014 Champion of Champions and 2014 UK Championship	
2	(England) Mark Selby	Winner of 2015 German Masters and 2015 China Open	
3	(England) Stuart Bingham	Winner of 2015 World Snooker Championship and 2015 Championship League	
4	(Australia) Neil Robertson	Winner of 2015 Gdynia Open	
5	(England) Shaun Murphy	Winner of 2015 Masters and 2014 Ruhr Open	
6	(England) Judd Trump	Winner of 2015 World Grand Prix	
7	(England) Barry Hawkins	Winner of 2015 Riga Open	
8	(England) Joe Perry	Winner of 2015 Players Championship Grand Final	
1	(Scotland) John Higgins	Winner of 2015 Welsh Open, 2015 Australian Goldfields Open, and 2015 International Championship	
	(Northern Ireland) Mark Allen	Winner of 2015 Bulgarian Open	
	(Scotland) Stephen Maguire	Winner of 2014 Lisbon Open	
	(Wales) Michael White	Winner of 2015 Indian Open	
	(England) Kyren Wilson	Winner of 2015 Shanghai Masters	
	(England) Ali Carter	Winner of 2015 Paul Hunter Classic	
	(England) Rory McLeod	Winner of 2015 Ruhr Open	
	(China) Zhou Yuelong	Winner of 2015 World Cup	
	(China) Yan Bingtao	Winner of 2015 World Cup	

Eight players were seeded. Seedings were determined in early October, before defending champion and top seed Ronnie O'Sullivan withdrew from the event. Other seeds were based on the latest world rankings (revision 3). Later in October, John Higgins was chosen as the final seed, being the highest ranked player who had then qualified and wasn't already seeded. He replaced O'Sullivan in the draw, taking the position allocated for the top seed. Mark Allen was ranked higher than Higgins in these rankings (revision 3) but hadn't qualified at that time.

== Main draw ==
Group semi-finals (round of 16); Best of 7 frames
1	(Scotland) John Higgins	4
(England) Ali Carter	2
Group 1 (11 November)
8	(England) Joe Perry	4
(Wales) Michael White	2
5	(England) Shaun Murphy	2
(China) Yan Bingtao	4
Group 4 (12 November)
4	(Australia) Neil Robertson	4
(England) Rory McLeod	0
3	(England) Stuart Bingham	3
(China) Zhou Yuelong	4
Group 3 (10 November)
6	(England) Judd Trump	2
(England) Kyren Wilson	4
7	(England) Barry Hawkins	2
(Northern Ireland) Mark Allen	4
Group 2 (13 November)
2	(England) Mark Selby	1
(Scotland) Stephen Maguire	4

Group finals (quarter-finals); Best of 11 frames
1	(Scotland) John Higgins	5
8	(England) Joe Perry	6
(China) Yan Bingtao	3
4	(Australia) Neil Robertson	6
(China) Zhou Yuelong	3
(England) Kyren Wilson	6
(Northern Ireland) Mark Allen	6
(Scotland) Stephen Maguire	2

Semi-finals; Best of 11 frames
8	(England) Joe Perry	4
4	(Australia) Neil Robertson	6
(England) Kyren Wilson	3
(Northern Ireland) Mark Allen	6

Final; Best of 19 frames
4	(Australia) Neil Robertson	10
(Northern Ireland) Mark Allen	5

== Final ==
Final: Best of 19 frames. Referee: Paul Collier. Ricoh Arena, Coventry, England, 15 November 2015.
Neil Robertson (4); Australia	10–5	Mark Allen; Northern Ireland
Afternoon: 63–35, 20–107 (103), 97–6 (53), 133–0 (114), 69–20 (69), 45–57, 69–44 (54), 5–81 (60), 75–25 (71); Evening: 86–0 (60), 76–35, 55–65 (Robertson 54), 0–112 (112), 46–38, 56–24
114	Highest break	112
1	Century breaks	2
7	50+ breaks	3

== Century breaks ==
Total: 14

- 144, 114, 109 – Neil Robertson
- 134, 107 – Stephen Maguire
- 131 – Barry Hawkins
- 128, 124 – Ali Carter
- 112, 105, 104, 103 – Mark Allen
- 112 – Joe Perry
- 104 – Judd Trump
