= 2014–15 snooker season =

Series of snooker tournaments

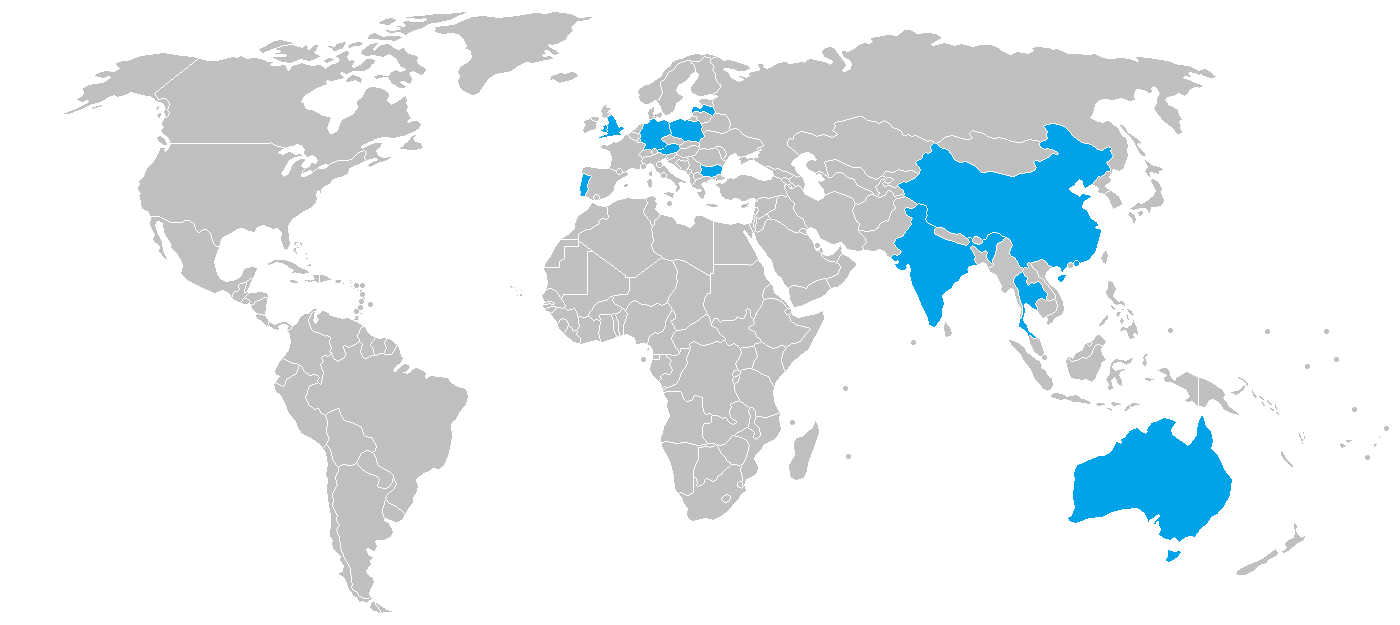
- Nations that hosted an event in the snooker calendar during the 2014–15 season

Details
- Duration: 8 May 2014 – 4 May 2015
- Tournaments: 30 (11 ranking events)

Triple Crown winners
- UK Championship: Ronnie O'Sullivan (ENG)
- Masters: Shaun Murphy (ENG)
- World Championship: Stuart Bingham (ENG)

The 2014–15 snooker season was a series of snooker tournaments played between 8 May 2014 and 4 May 2015. The Riga Open was the first professional snooker tournament held in Latvia. The season also saw the first professional tournament in Portugal as the Lisbon Open took place.

In November, it was announced that the World Open would not be held this season after the contract with the promoter was not renewed and a new venue was not found in time. But the intention was to bring the event back for the next season.

The structure of the World Championship was changed. The top 16 seeds still qualified automatically for the first round at the Crucible, but all non-seeded players had to start in the first of three qualifying rounds. The overall championship was increased from 128 to 144 players, with the additional places made available to former world champions and players from emerging countries.

== New professional players ==
Countries:

- Australia
- China
- England
- Iran
- Malaysia
- Malta
- Scotland
- Thailand
- Wales

The 2014/2015 season was made up of 128 professional players. (Note: Stephen Hendry, Steve Davis and James Wattana are not listed there, despite having received an Invitational Tour Card, because they were not automatically eligible to compete at tournaments.) The top 64 players from the prize money rankings after the 2014 World Championship, and the 33 players earning a two-year card the previous year (Note: Jin Long and Shi Hanqing didn't renew their WPBSA membership, while Patrick Einsle resigned from the Main Tour.) automatically qualified for the season. The top eight players from the European Tour Order of Merit and top four players from the Asian Tour Order of Merit, who had not already qualified for the Main Tour, also qualified. Another three players came from the EBSA Qualifying Tour Play-Offs, and a further eight places were available through the 2014 Q School. The rest of the places on to the tour came from amateur events and national governing body nominations. All players listed below, except Hossein Vafaei (Note: Hossein Vafaei received special dispensation to play on the Main Tour until the end of the season, when he will receive a two-year tour card.) received a tour card for two seasons.

International champions:

1. IBSF World Snooker Championship winner: Zhou Yuelong (CHN)
2. IBSF World Under-21 Snooker Championship winner: Lu Ning (CHN)
3. EBSA European Snooker Championships winner: Mitchell Mann (ENG)
4. EBSA European Under-21 Snooker Championships winner: Oliver Lines (ENG)
5. ACBS Asian Snooker Championship winner: Thor Chuan Leong (MYS)
6. ACBS Asian Under-21 Snooker Championship winner: Thanawat Thirapongpaiboon (THA)

NGB nominations

7. Oceania nomination: Steve Mifsud (AUS)

European Tour Order of Merit

8. Sam Baird (ENG)
9. Joel Walker (ENG)
10. Scott Donaldson (SCO)
11. Ian Burns (ENG)
12. Michael Wasley (ENG)
13. Barry Pinches (ENG)
14. David Grace (ENG)
15. Tony Drago (MLT)

EBSA Qualifying Tour Play-Offs

16. Ian Glover (ENG)
17. Steven Hallworth (ENG)
18. Zak Surety (ENG)

Asian Tour Order of Merit

19. Ju Reti (CHN)
20. Liu Chuang (CHN)
21. Lu Chenwei (CHN)
22. Rouzi Maimaiti (CHN)

Q School

23. Craig Steadman (ENG)
24. Chris Melling (ENG)
25. Zhang Anda (CHN)
26. Tian Pengfei (CHN)
27. Liam Highfield (ENG)
28. Michael Georgiou (ENG)
29. Lee Walker (WAL)
30. Michael Leslie (SCO)

Special dispensation

31. Hossein Vafaei (IRI)

Invitational Tour Card

32. Steve Davis (ENG)

== Calendar ==
The following table outlines the results and dates for all the World Snooker Tour, World Ladies Billiards and Snooker Association, seniors and other events.

=== World Snooker Tour ===
Start	Finish	Tournament	Venue	Winner	Score	Runner-up	Ref.
17 Jun	21 Jun	Asian Tour – Event 1 (Note: Event also known as the 2014 Yixing Open.)‡	Yixing Sports Centre in Yixing, China	Ding Junhui (CHN)	4‍–‍2	Michael Holt (ENG)	
23 Jun	29 Jun	Wuxi Classic	Wuxi City Sports Park Stadium in Wuxi, China	Neil Robertson (AUS)	10‍–‍9	Joe Perry (ENG)	
30 Jun	6 Jul	Australian Goldfields Open	Bendigo Stadium in Bendigo, Australia	Judd Trump (ENG)	9‍–‍5	Neil Robertson (AUS)	
7 Aug	10 Aug	European Tour – Event 1 (Note: Event also known as the 2014 Riga Open.)‡	Arena Riga in Riga, Latvia	Mark Selby (ENG)	4‍–‍3	Mark Allen (NIR)	
20 Aug	24 Aug	European Tour – Event 2 (Note: Event also known as the 2014 Paul Hunter Classic.)‡	Stadthalle in Fürth, Germany	Mark Allen (NIR)	4‍–‍2	Judd Trump (ENG)	
1 Sep	6 Sep	Six-red World Championship†	Montien Riverside Hotel in Bangkok, Thailand	Stephen Maguire (SCO)	8‍–‍7	Ricky Walden (ENG)	
8 Sep	14 Sep	Shanghai Masters	Shanghai Grand Stage in Shanghai, China	Stuart Bingham (ENG)	10‍–‍3	Mark Allen (NIR)	
1 Oct	5 Oct	European Tour – Event 3 (Note: Event also known as the 2014 Bulgarian Open)‡	Universiada Hall in Sofia, Bulgaria	Shaun Murphy (ENG)	4‍–‍2	Martin Gould (ENG)	
20 Oct	24 Oct	Asian Tour – Event 2 (Note: Event also known as the 2014 Haining Open.)‡	Haining Sports Center in Haining, China	Stuart Bingham (ENG)	4‍–‍0	Oliver Lines (ENG)	
26 Oct	2 Nov	International Championship	Sichuan International Tennis Center in Chengdu, China	Ricky Walden (ENG)	10‍–‍7	Mark Allen (NIR)	
3 Nov	9 Nov	Champion of Champions†	Ricoh Arena in Coventry, England	Ronnie O'Sullivan (ENG)	10‍–‍7	Judd Trump (ENG)	
19 Nov	23 Nov	European Tour – Event 4 (Note: Event also known as the 2014 Ruhr Open)‡	RWE-Sporthalle in Mülheim, Germany	Shaun Murphy (ENG)	4‍–‍0	Robert Milkins (ENG)	
25 Nov	7 Dec	UK Championship	Barbican Centre in York, England	Ronnie O'Sullivan (ENG)	10‍–‍9	Judd Trump (ENG)	
11 Dec	14 Dec	European Tour – Event 5 (Note: Event also known as the 2014 Lisbon Open.)‡	Casal Vistoso Sports Centre in Lisbon, Portugal	Stephen Maguire (SCO)	4‍–‍2	Matthew Selt (ENG)	
11 Jan	18 Jan	Masters†	Alexandra Palace in London, England	Shaun Murphy (ENG)	10‍–‍2	Neil Robertson (AUS)	
20 Jan	24 Jan	Asian Tour – Event 3 (Note: Event also known as the 2015 Xuzhou Open)‡	Xuzhou Olympic Center in Xuzhou, China	Joe Perry (ENG)	4‍–‍1	Thepchaiya Un-Nooh (THA)	
4 Feb	8 Feb	German Masters	Tempodrom in Berlin, Germany	Mark Selby (ENG)	9‍–‍7	Shaun Murphy (ENG)	
5 Jan	12 Feb	Championship League†	Crondon Park Golf Club in Stock, England	Stuart Bingham (ENG)	3‍–‍2	Mark Davis (ENG)	
16 Feb	22 Feb	Welsh Open	Motorpoint Arena in Cardiff, Wales	John Higgins (SCO)	9‍–‍3	Ben Woollaston (ENG)	
25 Feb	1 Mar	European Tour – Event 6 (Note: Event also known as the 2015 Gdynia Open.)‡	Gdynia Sports Arena in Gdynia, Poland	Neil Robertson (AUS)	4‍–‍0	Mark Williams (WAL)	
4 Mar	6 Mar	Shoot Out†	Circus Arena in Blackpool, England	Michael White (WAL)	1‍–‍0	Xiao Guodong (CHN)	
10 Mar	14 Mar	Indian Open	Grand Hyatt in Mumbai, India	Michael White (WAL)	5‍–‍0	Ricky Walden (ENG)	
16 Mar	22 Mar	World Grand Prix†	Venue Cymru in Llandudno, Wales	Judd Trump (ENG)	10‍–‍7	Ronnie O'Sullivan (ENG)	
24 Mar	28 Mar	Players Tour Championship Finals (Note: Event also known as the 2015 Players Championship Grand Final.)	Montien Riverside Hotel in Bangkok, Thailand	Joe Perry (ENG)	4‍–‍3	Mark Williams (WAL)	
30 Mar	5 Apr	China Open	Beijing University Students' Gymnasium in Beijing, China	Mark Selby (ENG)	10‍–‍2	Gary Wilson (ENG)	
18 Apr	4 May	World Championship	Crucible Theatre in Sheffield, England	Stuart Bingham (ENG)	18‍–‍15	Shaun Murphy (ENG)	

Ranking event
‡ Minor-ranking event
† Non-ranking event

=== World Ladies Billiards and Snooker Association ===
Start	Finish	Tournament	Venue	Winner	Score	Runner-up	Ref.
4 Oct	5 Oct	Eden Classic	Cueball Derby in Derby, England	Reanne Evans (ENG)	5‍–‍3	Maria Catalano (ENG)	
31 Jan	1 Feb	Eden Masters	Crucible Sports Club in Newbury, England	Reanne Evans (ENG)	5‍–‍1	Ng On-Yee (HKG)	
28 Mar		Connie Gough Trophy	Dunstable Snooker Club in Dunstable, England	Reanne Evans (ENG)	4‍–‍1	Jasmine Bolsover (ENG)	
18 Apr	21 Apr	World Ladies Championship	Northern Snooker Centre in Leeds, England	Ng On-Yee (HKG)	6‍–‍2	Emma Bonney (ENG)	

=== Seniors events ===
Start	Finish	Tournament	Venue	Winner	Score	Runner-up	Ref.
2 Mar	3 Mar	World Seniors Championship	Circus Arena in Blackpool, England	Mark Williams (WAL)	2‍–‍1	Fergal O'Brien (IRL)	

=== Other events ===
Start	Finish	Tournament	Venue	Winner	Score	Runner-up	Ref.
8 May	11 May	Vienna Open	15 Reds Köö Wien Snooker Club in Vienna, Austria	Mark King (ENG)	5‍–‍2	Nigel Bond (ENG)	
4 Jun	8 Jun	Pink Ribbon	The Capital Venue in Gloucester, England	Peter Lines (ENG)	4‍–‍1	Lee Walker (WAL)	
12 Oct	18 Oct	General Cup	General Snooker Club in Hong Kong, China	Ali Carter (ENG)	7‍–‍6	Shaun Murphy (ENG)	

== Points distribution ==
2014/2015 points distribution for World Snooker Tour ranking and minor-ranking events:

Tournament\Round→	R144	R128	R96	R80	R64	R48	R32	R16	QF	SF	F	W
Asian Tour events	–	0	–	–	200	–	600	1,000	1,500	2,500	5,000	10,000
Wuxi Classic	–	0	–	–	3,000	–	6,500	8,000	12,500	21,000	35,000	85,000
Australian Goldfields Open	–	0	83 (Note: Players, who lose their first match, receive no ranking points.)	–	417	889	5,000	6,667	9,444	11,111	17,778	41,677
European Tour events	–	0	–	–	583	–	1,000	1,917	3,333	5,000	10,000	20,883
Shanghai Masters	–	0	400	–	1,750	2,500	6,000	8,000	12,000	19,500	35,000	85,000
International Championship	–	0	–	–	3,000	–	7,000	12,000	17,500	30,000	65,000	125,000
UK Championship	–	0	–	–	3,000	–	9,000	12,000	20,000	30,000	70,000	150,000
German Masters	–	0	–	–	1,250	–	2,500	4,167	8,333	16,667	29,167	66,667
Welsh Open	–	0	–	–	1,500	–	2,500	5,000	10,000	20,000	30,000	60,000
Indian Open	–	0	–	–	2,000	–	3,000	6,000	9,000	13,500	25,000	50,000
Players Championship Grand Finals	–	–	–	–	–	–	4,000	7,000	12,500	20,000	38,000	100,000
China Open	–	0	–	–	3,000	–	6,500	8,000	12,500	21,000	35,000	85,000
World Championship	0	–	–	6,000	–	9,000	12,000	20,000	30,000	60,000	125,000	300,000
