= Players Tour Championship 2014/2015 =

The Players Tour Championship 2014/2015 was a series of snooker tournaments which started on 17 June 2014 and ended on 28 March 2015, with events held across Europe and Asia. In this season the European events formed the European Tour and events held in Asia the Asian Tour. The nine regular minor-ranking events concluded with the Finals. Both event five and event six of the European Tour were sponsored by Kreativ Dental.

== Schedule ==
Date (Note: Dates use the month day format)			Tournament Name	Venue	City	Winner	Runner–up	Score	References
06–17	06–21	CHN	Asian Tour – Event 1 (Note: Event also known as the 2014 Yixing Open.)	Yixing Sports Centre	Yixing	(China) Ding Junhui	(England) Michael Holt	4–2	
08–07	08–10	LAT	European Tour – Event 1 (Note: Event also known as the 2014 Riga Open.)	Arena Riga	Riga	(England) Mark Selby	(Northern Ireland) Mark Allen	4–3	
08–20	08–24	GER	European Tour – Event 2 (Note: Event also known as the 2014 Paul Hunter Classic.)	Stadthalle	Fürth	(Northern Ireland) Mark Allen	(England) Judd Trump	4–2	
10–01	10–05	BUL	European Tour – Event 3 (Note: Event also known as the 2014 Bulgarian Open.)	Universiada Hall	Sofia	(England) Shaun Murphy	(England) Martin Gould	4–2	
10–20	10–24	CHN	Asian Tour – Event 2 (Note: Event also known as the 2014 Haining Open.)	Haining Sports Center	Haining	(England) Stuart Bingham	(England) Oliver Lines	4–0	
11–19	11–23	GER	European Tour – Event 4 (Note: Event also known as the 2014 Ruhr Open.)	RWE-Sporthalle	Mülheim	(England) Shaun Murphy	(England) Robert Milkins	4–0	
12–11	12–14	PRT	European Tour – Event 5 (Note: Event also known as the 2014 Lisbon Open.)	Casal Vistoso Sports Centre	Lisbon	(Scotland) Stephen Maguire	(England) Matthew Selt	4–2	
01–20	01–24	CHN	Asian Tour – Event 3 (Note: Event also known as the 2015 Xuzhou Open.)	Xuzhou Olympic Center	Xuzhou	(England) Joe Perry	(Thailand) Thepchaiya Un-Nooh	4–1	
02–25	03–01	POL	European Tour – Event 6 (Note: Event also known as the 2015 Gdynia Open.)	Gdynia Sports Arena	Gdynia	(Australia) Neil Robertson	(Wales) Mark Williams	4–0	
03–24	03–28	THA	Players Tour Championship – Finals (Note: Event also known as the 2015 Players Championship Grand Final.)	Montien Riverside Hotel	Bangkok	(England) Joe Perry	(Wales) Mark Williams	4–3	

== Order of Merit ==
=== European Tour ===
Player qualified for the Finals through the Asian Tour Order of Merit

After 6 out of 6 events:

Rank	Player	Total Points	Events Played
1	(England) Shaun Murphy	48,249	6
2	(Northern Ireland) Mark Allen	31,833	3
3	(Scotland) Stephen Maguire	29,333	6
4	(England) Mark Selby	28,499	4
5	(Australia) Neil Robertson	27,249	5
6	(England) Judd Trump	26,916	6
7	(England) Robert Milkins	17,750	6
8	(Wales) Mark Williams	16,250	6
9	(England) Matthew Selt	15,500	6
10	(England) Martin Gould	12,500	4
11	(England) Mark Davis	12,416	6
12	(England) Barry Hawkins	12,000	5
13	(England) Peter Ebdon	11,833	5
14	(England) Rod Lawler	10,499	6
15	(England) Jimmy Robertson	10,083	6
16	(Belgium) Luca Brecel	9,832	6
17	(England) Joe Perry	9,166	5
18	(Scotland) Alan McManus	9,084	5
19	(England) Ricky Walden	9,083	5
20	(Wales) Michael White	8,583	6
21	(Scotland) Anthony McGill	8,000	6
22	(Hong Kong) Marco Fu	7,416	6
23	(England) Chris Wakelin	7,416	6
24	(England) Mark King	7,000	6
25	(Wales) Dominic Dale	6,583	6
26	(Scotland) John Higgins	6,583	6

(Top 26 players out of 395)

=== Asian Tour ===
After 3 out of 3 events:

Rank	Player	Total Points	Events Played
1	(England) Joe Perry	12,000	3
2	(China) Ding Junhui	11,500	2
3	(England) Stuart Bingham	10,600	2
4	(Thailand) Thepchaiya Un-Nooh	6,200	3
5	(England) Oliver Lines	6,000	2
6	(England) Michael Holt	5,000	1
7	(Wales) Ryan Day	4,000	2
8	(England) Jimmy Robertson	3,500	2

(Top 8 players out of 219)

== Finals ==
The Finals of the Players Tour Championship 2014/2015 took place between 24–28 March 2015 at the Montien Riverside Hotel in Bangkok, Thailand. It was contested by the top 24 players on the European Tour Order of Merit, and the top eight from the Asian Tour Order of Merit. If a player qualified from both Order of Merits, then the highest position counted and the next player on the other list qualified. If a player finished on both lists on the same place, then the European Tour Order of Merit took precedence and the next player from the Asian Tour Order of Merit qualified. The seeding list of the Finals was based on the combined list from the earnings of both Order of Merits.

Final: Best of 7 frames. Referee: Paul Collier. Montien Riverside Hotel, Bangkok, Thailand, 28 March 2015.
Mark Williams (9); Wales	3–4	Joe Perry (7); England
73–22 (64), 80–0 (57), 103–30 (103), 15–64, 0–68 (50), 21–59 (56), 7–78 (54)
103	Highest break	56
1	Century breaks	0
3	50+ breaks	3
