= European Tour 2013/2014 – Event 5 =

European Tour 2013/2014 Event 5

Tournament information
- Dates: 3–6 October 2013
- Venue: RWE-Sporthalle
- City: Mülheim
- Country: Germany
- Organisation: World Snooker
- Format: Minor-ranking event
- Total prize fund: €125,000
- Winner's share: €25,000
- Highest break: Gerard Greene (NIR) (144)

Final
- Champion: Mark Allen (NIR)
- Runner-up: Ding Junhui (CHN)
- Score: 4–1

The European Tour 2013/2014 – Event 5 (also known as the 2013 Ruhr Open) was a professional minor-ranking snooker tournament that took place between 3–6 October 2013 at the RWE-Sporthalle in Mülheim, Germany.

Mark Allen won his fifth professional title by defeating Ding Junhui 4–1 in the final.

== Prize fund and ranking points ==
The breakdown of prize money and ranking points of the event is shown below:

	Prize fund	Ranking points^{1}
Winner	€25,000	2,000
Runner-up	€12,000	1,600
Semi-finalist	€6,000	1,280
Quarter-finalist	€4,000	1,000
Last 16	€2,300	760
Last 32	€1,200	560
Last 64	€700	360
Total	€125,000	–

- ^{1} Only professional players can earn ranking points.

== Main draw ==
=== Preliminary rounds ===
==== Round 1 ====
Best of 7 frames

(Wales) Kishan Hirani	3–4	(England) Richard Haney
(Belgium) Wan Chooi Tan	4–2	(England) Mitchell Mann
(Germany) Miro Popovic	4–0	(Germany) Christian Pesch
(Belgium) Steven Put	0–4	(England) Oliver Lines
(Germany) Daniel Schneider	1–4	(Germany) Felix Frede
(Germany) Sascha Brauer	2–4	(England) Ashley Carty
(England) Daniel Ward	4–1	(Denmark) Lasse Petersen
(Scotland) Ross Higgins	0–4	(Belgium) Kevin Van Hove
(England) Matthew Day	4–0	(Pakistan) Imran Ayaz
(England) Zack Richardson	0–4	(Wales) Ben Jones
(Turkey) Soner Sari	2–4	(Germany) Lukas Kleckers
(Belgium) Jeff Jacobs	2–4	(England) Saqib Nasir

(England) Williams Lemons	w/o–n/s	(England) Damian Wilks
(Belgium) Wendy Jans	4–0	(Germany) Dirk Oppenhoff
(England) Oliver Brown	4–3	(England) Sydney Wilson
(Northern Ireland) Billy Brown	4–0	(Germany) Markus Fischer
(Wales) Jimmy Carney	4–1	(Germany) Kemal Ueruen
(Belgium) Jurian Heusdens	4–0	(Netherlands) Emile Bastiaan Hendriksen
(Germany) Andreas Cieslak	4–0	(Germany) Habib Shalchian
(Belgium) Dennis Van Veldhoven	0–4	(England) Phil O'Kane
(Netherlands) Fozan Masood	4–0	(Germany) Diana Schuler
(England) Joe Steele	4–2	(England) Mark Vincent
(England) Ben Harrison	4–0	(Austria) Benjamin Buser
(England) Ismail Turker	4–0	(Germany) Andreas Pesch

==== Round 2 ====
Best of 7 frames

(England) Michael Georgiou	4–0	(England) Richard Haney
(England) Thomas Wealthy	0–4	(Belgium) Wan Chooi Tan
(England) Reanne Evans	4–0	(Germany) Miro Popovic
(England) Oliver Lines	4–0	(Germany) Felix Frede
(England) Sanderson Lam	4–2	(England) Ashley Carty
(Germany) Felix Buchfeld	0–4	(England) Daniel Ward
(Germany) Roman Dietzel	2–4	(Belgium) Kevin Van Hove
(Germany) Sebastian Zittermann	0–4	(England) Matthew Day
(England) Ryan Causton	4–1	(Wales) Ben Jones
(England) Ian Glover	4–1	(Germany) Lukas Kleckers
(Germany) Jacek Stacha	0–4	(England) Saqib Nasir

(Germany) Phil Barnes	4–3	(England) Williams Lemons
(Afghanistan) Ismail Ali	1–4	(Belgium) Wendy Jans
(England) Oliver Brown	4–1	(Northern Ireland) Billy Brown
(Denmark) Rune Kampe	4–1	(Wales) Jimmy Carney
(Germany) Sascha Lippe	w/d–w/o	(Belgium) Jurian Heusdens
(Scotland) Marc Davis	4–0	(Germany) Andreas Cieslak
(Belgium) Kevin Vandevoort	0–4	(England) Phil O'Kane
(Belgium) Hans Blanckaert	4–0	(Netherlands) Fozan Masood
(England) Christopher Keogan	w/d–w/o	(England) Joe Steele
(Belgium) Tomasz Skalski	0–4	(England) Ben Harrison
(Germany) Christian Gabriel	4–0	(England) Ismail Turker

==== Round 3 ====
Best of 7 frames

(England) Michael Georgiou	4–1	(Belgium) Wan Chooi Tan
(England) Reanne Evans	0–4	(England) Oliver Lines
(England) Sanderson Lam	4–3	(England) Daniel Ward
(Belgium) Kevin Van Hove	4–1	(England) Matthew Day]
(England) Ryan Causton	4–1	(England) Ian Glover
(England) Saqib Nasir	1–4	(Germany) Phil Barnes

(Belgium) Wendy Jans	4–2	(England) Oliver Brown
(Denmark) Rune Kampe	1–4	(Belgium) Jurian Heusdens
(Scotland) Marc Davis	4–1	(England) Phil O'Kane
(Belgium) Hans Blanckaert	2–4	(England) Joe Steele
(England) Ben Harrison	4–2	(Germany) Christian Gabriel

=== Main rounds ===
==== Top half ====
===== Section 1 =====
Last 128; Best of 7 frames
(England) Ronnie O'Sullivan	4
(Scotland) Ross Muir	0
(England) Ben Woollaston	4
(England) Michael Georgiou	3
(England) Ian Burns	2
(England) Joel Walker	4
(England) Alfie Burden	4
(Thailand) Dechawat Poomjaeng	3
(England) Stuart Carrington	4
(England) Peter Ebdon	0
(England) Liam Highfield	0
(Malta) Alex Borg	4
(Scotland) Michael Leslie	1
(England) Chris Norbury	4
(England) Gary Wilson	4
(China) Xiao Guodong	2

Last 64; Best of 7 frames
(England) Ronnie O'Sullivan	3
(England) Ben Woollaston	4
(England) Joel Walker	2
(England) Alfie Burden	4
(England) Stuart Carrington	4
(Malta) Alex Borg	2
(England) Chris Norbury	4
(England) Gary Wilson	3

Last 32; Best of 7 frames
(England) Ben Woollaston	4
(England) Alfie Burden	0
(England) Stuart Carrington	0
(England) Chris Norbury	4

Last 16; Best of 7 frames
(England) Ben Woollaston	4
(England) Chris Norbury	0

===== Section 2 =====
Last 128; Best of 7 frames
(Norway) Kurt Maflin	2
(England) Mark King	4
(Scotland) Scott Donaldson	2
(England) Oliver Lines	4
(Scotland) Anthony McGill	1
(England) Craig Steadman	4
(England) Hammad Miah	4
(England) Sanderson Lam	0
(Thailand) Thanawat Thirapongpaiboon	2
(England) Adam Duffy	4
(Scotland) Stephen Maguire	4
(England) Sean O'Sullivan	2
(Scotland) Marcus Campbell	4
(England) Joe Perry	3
(India) Aditya Mehta	4
(Belgium) Kevin Van Hove	1

Last 64; Best of 7 frames
(England) Mark King	4
(England) Oliver Lines	1
(England) Craig Steadman	4
(England) Hammad Miah	3
(England) Adam Duffy	1
(Scotland) Stephen Maguire	4
(Scotland) Marcus Campbell	3
(India) Aditya Mehta	4

Last 32; Best of 7 frames
(England) Mark King	4
(England) Craig Steadman	2
(Scotland) Stephen Maguire	4
(India) Aditya Mehta	3

Last 16; Best of 7 frames
(England) Mark King	3
(Scotland) Stephen Maguire	4

===== Section 3 =====
Last 128; Best of 7 frames
(England) Barry Hawkins	4
(England) Ryan Causton	0
(England) Mike Dunn	w/o
(Wales) Jak Jones	w/d
(India) Pankaj Advani	4
(England) Jimmy White	2
(England) David Grace	3
(England) Barry Pinches	4
(Northern Ireland) Joe Swail	4
(Thailand) Ratchayothin Yotharuck	2
(Wales) Ryan Day	4
(China) Li Yan	3
(England) Tom Ford	2
(England) Chris Wakelin	4
(Republic of Ireland) David Morris	3
(Thailand) Thepchaiya Un-Nooh	4

Last 64; Best of 7 frames
(England) Barry Hawkins	4
(England) Mike Dunn	0
(India) Pankaj Advani	4
(England) Barry Pinches	1
(Northern Ireland) Joe Swail	3
(Wales) Ryan Day	4
(England) Chris Wakelin	2
(Thailand) Thepchaiya Un-Nooh	4

Last 32; Best of 7 frames
(England) Barry Hawkins	4
(India) Pankaj Advani	2
(Wales) Ryan Day	4
(Thailand) Thepchaiya Un-Nooh	0

Last 16; Best of 7 frames
(England) Barry Hawkins	2
(Wales) Ryan Day	4

===== Section 4 =====
Last 128; Best of 7 frames
(England) Ali Carter	0
(Wales) Andrew Pagett	4
(England) Martin Gould	3
(England) Alex Davies	4
(China) Ding Junhui	4
(China) Li Hang	1
(England) Rod Lawler	4
(England) Jack Lisowski	2
(England) Anthony Hamilton	4
(China) Zhang Anda	2
(Wales) Matthew Stevens	w/o
(Thailand) James Wattana	w/d
(Northern Ireland) Gerard Greene	4
(Germany) Phil Barnes	0
(England) Nigel Bond	4
(Belgium) Wendy Jans	0

Last 64; Best of 7 frames
(Wales) Andrew Pagett	2
(England) Alex Davies	4
(China) Ding Junhui	4
(England) Rod Lawler	0
(England) Anthony Hamilton	4
(Wales) Matthew Stevens	1
(Northern Ireland) Gerard Greene	4
(England) Nigel Bond	2

Last 32; Best of 7 frames
(England) Alex Davies	3
(China) Ding Junhui	4
(England) Anthony Hamilton	4
(Northern Ireland) Gerard Greene	2

Last 16; Best of 7 frames
(China) Ding Junhui	4
(England) Anthony Hamilton	3

==== Bottom half ====
===== Section 5 =====
Last 128; Best of 7 frames
(England) Ricky Walden	w/o
(Scotland) Graeme Dott	w/d
(England) John Astley	2
(England) Dave Harold	4
(England) David Gilbert	4
(Thailand) Noppon Saengkham	2
(England) Michael Wasley	1
(England) Jamie Cope	4
(England) Andrew Norman	4
(England) Ryan Clark	0
(Republic of Ireland) Ken Doherty	3
(China) Liu Chuang	4
(England) Martin O'Donnell	w/o
(Australia) Vinnie Calabrese	n/s
(England) Robbie Williams	4
(Belgium) Jurian Heusdens	3

Last 64; Best of 7 frames
(England) Ricky Walden	2
(England) Dave Harold	4
(England) David Gilbert	4
(England) Jamie Cope	0
(England) Andrew Norman	0
(China) Liu Chuang	4
(England) Martin O'Donnell	2
(England) Robbie Williams	4

Last 32; Best of 7 frames
(England) Dave Harold	2
(England) David Gilbert	4
(China) Liu Chuang	1
(England) Robbie Williams	4

Last 16; Best of 7 frames
(England) David Gilbert	3
(England) Robbie Williams	4

===== Section 6 =====
Last 128; Best of 7 frames
(England) Shaun Murphy	3
(England) Matthew Selt	4
(England) Michael Holt	w/o
(China) Lyu Haotian	w/d
(Wales) Dominic Dale	2
(England) Paul Davison	4
(Belgium) Luca Brecel	4
(England) Allan Taylor	1
(Australia) Neil Robertson	4
(Qatar) Ahmed Saif	0
(England) Robert Milkins	4
(Switzerland) Alexander Ursenbacher	0
(Scotland) Alan McManus	4
(China) Liang Wenbo	3
(England) Stuart Bingham	4
(Scotland) Marc Davis	0

Last 64; Best of 7 frames
(England) Matthew Selt	2
(England) Michael Holt	4
(England) Paul Davison	0
(Belgium) Luca Brecel	4
(Australia) Neil Robertson	4
(England) Robert Milkins	1
(Scotland) Alan McManus	3
(England) Stuart Bingham	4

Last 32; Best of 7 frames
(England) Michael Holt	3
(Belgium) Luca Brecel	4
(Australia) Neil Robertson	2
(England) Stuart Bingham	4

Last 16; Best of 7 frames
(Belgium) Luca Brecel	4
(England) Stuart Bingham	1

===== Section 7 =====
Last 128; Best of 7 frames
(England) Kyren Wilson	4
(China) Chen Zhe	1
(Wales) Jamie Jones	4
(Egypt) Mohamed Khairy	0
(England) Peter Lines	4
(England) Joe Steele	1
(Hong Kong) Marco Fu	4
(England) Rory McLeod	2
(England) Mark Joyce	4
(England) James Cahill	2
(England) Steve Davis	4
(England) Jamie O'Neill	2
(England) Judd Trump	4
(England) Andrew Higginson	1
(Wales) Daniel Wells	1
(England) Elliot Slessor	4

Last 64; Best of 7 frames
(England) Kyren Wilson	4
(Wales) Jamie Jones	1
(England) Peter Lines	1
(Hong Kong) Marco Fu	4
(England) Mark Joyce	0
(England) Steve Davis	4
(England) Judd Trump	4
(England) Elliot Slessor	1

Last 32; Best of 7 frames
(England) Kyren Wilson	4
(Hong Kong) Marco Fu	3
(England) Steve Davis	0
(England) Judd Trump	4

Last 16; Best of 7 frames
(England) Kyren Wilson	2
(England) Judd Trump	4

===== Section 8 =====
Last 128; Best of 7 frames
(England) Mark Davis	4
(Germany) Patrick Einsle	0
(Wales) Michael White	4
(China) Yu Delu	1
(England) Sam Baird	4
(England) Ben Harrison	3
(Republic of Ireland) Fergal O'Brien	4
(China) Cao Yupeng	0
(Northern Ireland) Mark Allen	4
(Finland) Robin Hull	1
(Malta) Tony Drago	4
(England) Lee Page	2
(England) Jimmy Robertson	w/o
(Scotland) Fraser Patrick	w/d
(Wales) Mark Williams	4
(China) Tian Pengfei	2

Last 64; Best of 7 frames
(England) Mark Davis	4
(Wales) Michael White	1
(England) Sam Baird	4
(Republic of Ireland) Fergal O'Brien	2
(Northern Ireland) Mark Allen	4
(Malta) Tony Drago	2
(England) Jimmy Robertson	1
(Wales) Mark Williams	4

Last 32; Best of 7 frames
(England) Mark Davis	4
(England) Sam Baird	2
(Northern Ireland) Mark Allen	4
(Wales) Mark Williams	2

Last 16; Best of 7 frames
(England) Mark Davis	3
(Northern Ireland) Mark Allen	4

==== Finals ====
Quarter-finals; Best of 7 frames		Semi-finals; Best of 7 frames		Final; Best of 7 frames
(England) Ben Woollaston	3
(Scotland) Stephen Maguire	4	(Scotland) Stephen Maguire	3
(Wales) Ryan Day	1	(China) Ding Junhui	4
(China) Ding Junhui	4			(China) Ding Junhui	1
(England) Robbie Williams	4			(Northern Ireland) Mark Allen	4
(Belgium) Luca Brecel	3	(England) Robbie Williams	0
(England) Judd Trump	1	(Northern Ireland) Mark Allen	4
(Northern Ireland) Mark Allen	4

== Century breaks ==
- 144 – Gerard Greene
- 139, 120, 100, 100 – Mark Allen
- 137, 114, 106, 103 – David Gilbert
- 136 – Sam Baird
- 132 – Ben Harrison
- 129, 105 – Mark Davis
- 126 – Luca Brecel
- 120 – Shaun Murphy
- 120 – Marco Fu
- 119, 105 – Ben Woollaston
- 118, 106 – Ronnie O'Sullivan
- 117, 107, 104 – Ding Junhui
- 115, 100 – Judd Trump
- 114, 103, 101, 101 – Stephen Maguire
- 114 – Kyren Wilson
- 108, 105, 103, 100, 100, 100 – Neil Robertson
- 107 – Rod Lawler
- 105 – Stuart Bingham
- 105 – Craig Steadman
- 104 – Michael White
- 103, 100, 100 – Chris Norbury
- 103 – Barry Hawkins
- 103 – Anthony Hamilton
- 100 – Barry Pinches
- 100 – Ricky Walden
