= Robbie Williams (snooker player) =

English snooker player (born 1986)

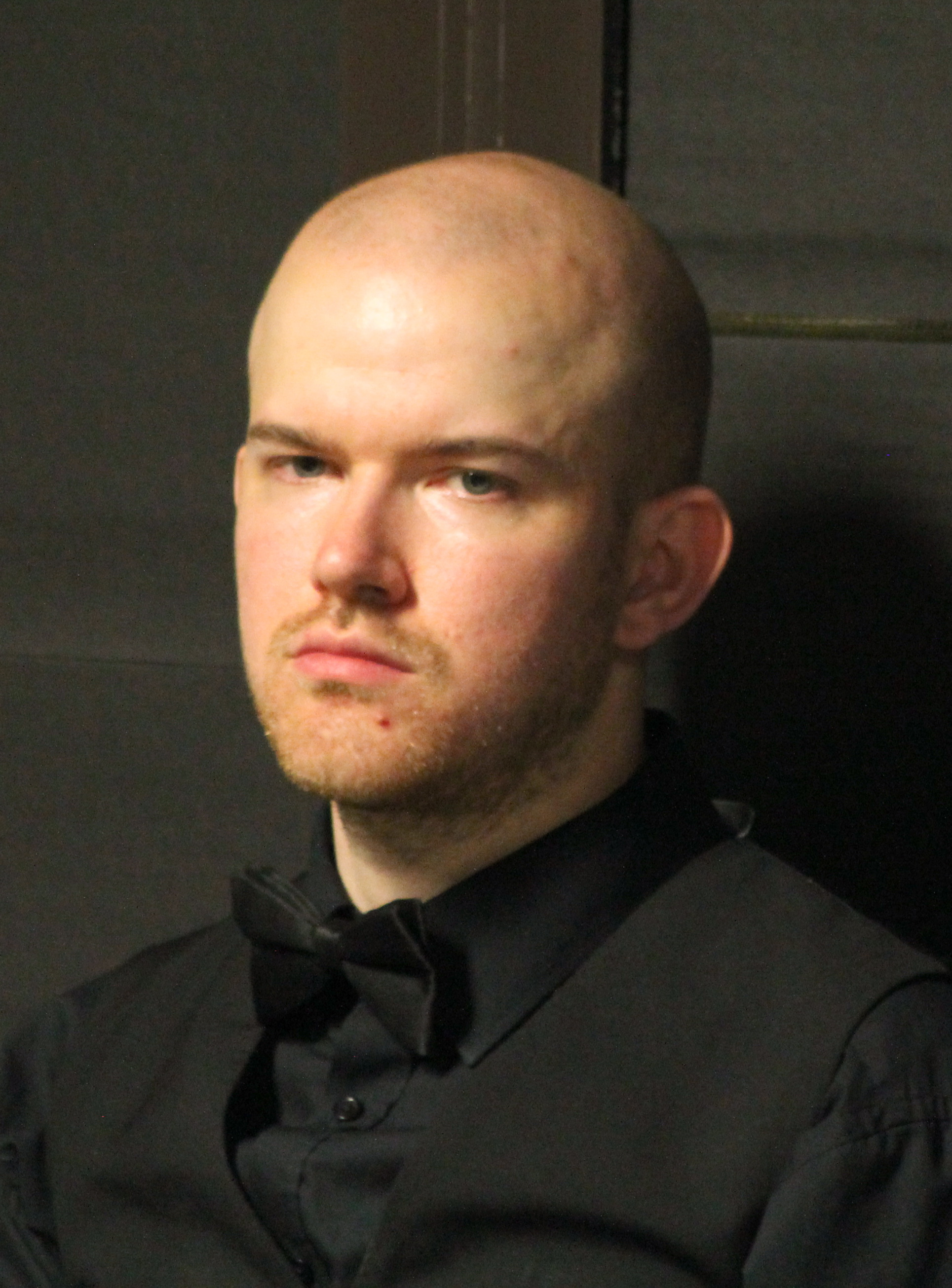
- Paul Hunter Classic 2016

Personal information
- Born: 28 December 1986 (age 39) Wallasey, England

Sport
- Country: England
- Sport: Snooker
- Professional: 2012–present
- Highest ranking: 36 (May 2024)
- Current ranking: 55 (as of 7 November 2026)
- Century breaks: 103 (as of 19 November 2026)
- Best ranking finish: Semi-final (x3)

Robbie Williams (born 28 December 1986) is an English professional snooker player.

Williams turned professional in 2012 after qualifying in Event 3 of the Q School and gained a two-year tour card for the 2012/13 and 2013/14 snooker seasons.

== Amateur career ==
He has represented England in a number of amateur competitions, including the World Under 21 Championships in India. Williams has won the Merseyside Open five times.

In 2010, he won the Paul Hunter English Open. In June 2011, he reached the last 16 of a PTC event, beating Peter Ebdon, Nick Jennings and Ali Carter, before losing to Graeme Dott. In March 2012, he was part of the England team who claimed victory in the European Team Championships. In May, he qualified for the main snooker tour by coming through the third 2012 Q School event with a 4–3 win over Mitchell Mann in his final match, with a break of 102 in the deciding frame.

== Professional career ==
=== Debut season ===
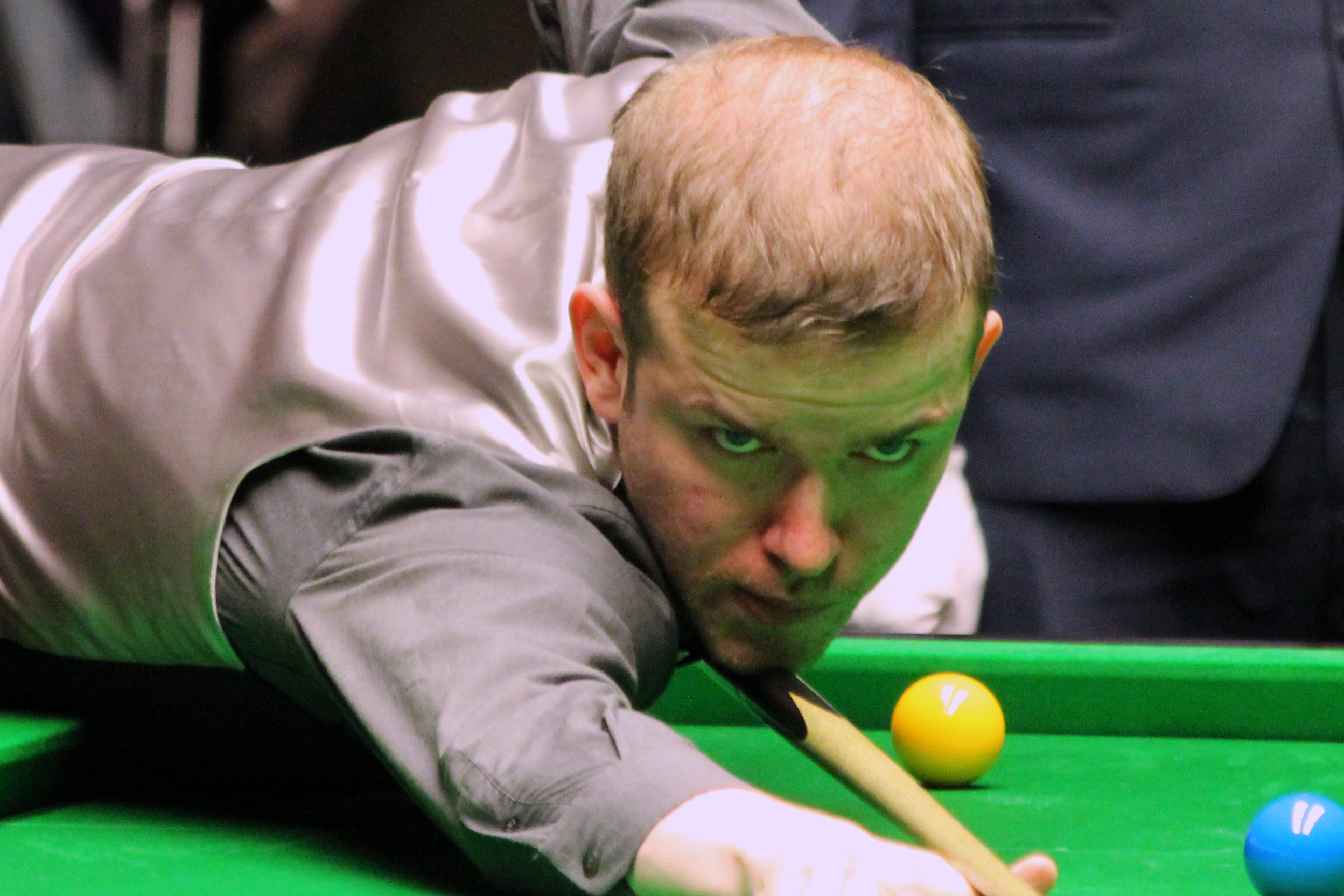
2012 Paul Hunter Classic

Williams' first match as a professional was in qualifying for the 2012 Wuxi Classic, where he lost 2–5 to Thepchaiya Un-Nooh. He won two matches, but lost in the third qualifying round three times during the season in the ranking events. Williams played in all ten of the minor-ranking Players Tour Championship events, with his best finish coming in the first European Tour Event where he beat established players Tom Ford, Robert Milkins and Jamie Cope, before losing a last frame decider to Mark Selby. It was largely down to this result which saw Williams finish 47th on the PTC Order of Merit. His season ended when he was beaten 7–10 by Li Yan in the first round of World Championship Qualifying, which saw him finish his first year on tour ranked world number 79.

=== 2013/14 season ===
Williams' enjoyed a superb spell of play in October 2013. It began at the minor-ranking Ruhr Open where he won five games to reach the semi-finals, but he lost 4–0 against Mark Allen. At the Indian Open he beat Shaun Murphy to qualify and received a bye through the first round due to Kyren Wilson's withdrawal. Williams then swept into his first ranking event semi-final with the loss of just one frame as he eliminated Andrew Higginson (4–1), Mike Dunn (4–0) and Anthony McGill (4–0). A last four meeting with Ding Junhui followed and it proved a match too far for Williams as he was beaten 4–1. His aforementioned semi-final run in Germany helped him to finish 26th on the European Order of Merit, just one spot short of qualifying for the Finals.

In World Championship qualifying, Williams earned wins over Lü Haotian, Liu Chuang and Pankaj Advani to face Fergal O'Brien for a spot in snooker's biggest event for the first time. Williams produced a superb comeback from 7–2 down to force a deciding frame at 9–9, which he led by 57 points. However, O'Brien then compiled a break of 57 to level the scores meaning a respotted black was required to settle the match which Williams duly potted to seal his first round berth. Williams played world number one Neil Robertson and was beaten 10–2. He ended the season in top 64 of the world rankings for the first time as he was placed 62nd.

=== 2014/15 season ===
Williams made his debut at a Chinese ranking event at the 2014 Wuxi Classic and lost 5–1 to Mark Selby in the first round. He soon played in his second by qualifying for the International Championship, but lost 6–4 against Stuart Bingham. Williams' only win at the venue stage of a ranking event this season came at the UK Championship, with a 6–4 victory over Sam Baird, before missing a good chance when 5–4 up against Ricky Walden to be ultimately knocked out 6–5.

Williams qualified for his second successive World Championship courtesy of beating Lee Page 10–3, Dechawat Poomjaeng 10–8 and Michael Holt 10–5. He edged the first session against Bingham 5–4, but went on to be defeated 10–7. Williams finished the season with a career high world ranking of 50th.

=== 2015/16 season ===
The first ranking event Williams could reach in the 2015–16 season was the International Championship and he was beaten 6–5 by Ben Woollaston in the first round. At the UK Championship he overcame both Mitchell Mann and Joe Perry 6–3 and described the latter as the best win of his career, with Perry stating that his opponent's style and speed of play was a joke. Williams went on to lose 6–3 against Matthew Selt in the third round. He reached the second round of the Welsh Open and was edged out 4–3 by Barry Hawkins. Williams qualified for the World Championship for the third year in a row by beating Gareth Allen 10–7, Mark Joyce 10–4 and Anthony Hamilton 10–9. Even though Williams said afterwards that he felt like the worst player in the tournament, he led Ricky Walden (a player who had lost in the final of the previous two ranking events) 5–4 and 7–5, but would ultimately lose 10–8.

=== 2016/17 season ===
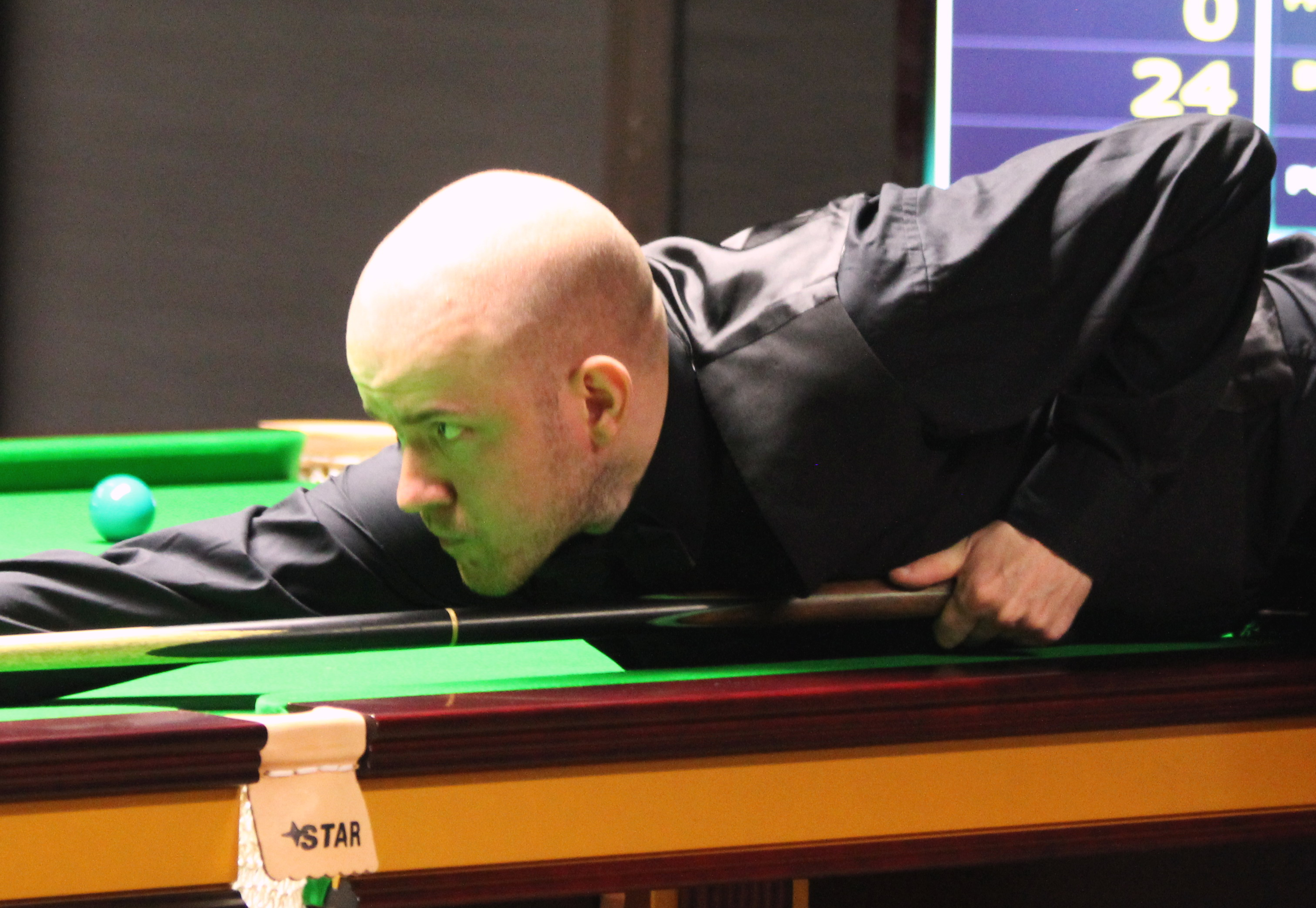
2016 Paul Hunter Classic

At the 2016 Paul Hunter Classic, Williams defeated Simon Lichtenberg 4–1, Joe Perry 4–2 and Andrew Higginson 4–3, but was then heavily beaten 4–0 by David Grace. In the third round of the Northern Ireland Open he levelled at 3–3 after being 3–0 down to Yan Bingtao, before losing the deciding frame. At the UK Championship, Williams overcame Akani Songsermsawad 6–1 and then lost 6–2 to Ali Carter. Wins over Grace, Andy Hicks and Michael White at the Welsh Open saw him reach the last 16 of a ranking event for the second time this season and he was whitewashed 4–0 by Stuart Bingham.

=== 2017/18 season ===
Williams put on one of the most significant showings of his career to reach the quarter-finals of the 2017 International Championship. He defeated Joe Perry and Neil Robertson along the way, but eventually lost out to Mark Selby.

== Performance and rankings timeline ==
Tournament	2010/ 11	2011/ 12	2012/ 13	2013/ 14	2014/ 15	2015/ 16	2016/ 17	2017/ 18	2018/ 19	2019/ 20	2020/ 21	2021/ 22	2022/ 23	2023/ 24	2024/ 25	2025/ 26	2026/ 27
Ranking (Note: It shows the ranking at the beginning of the season)	(Note: He was an amateur)		(Note: New players on the Main Tour don't have a ranking)	79	62	50	55	53	57	60	(Note: Players qualified One Year Ranking List started the season without ranking points)	68	61	48	36	47	56
Ranking tournaments
Championship League	Tournament Not Held										RR	RR	RR	2R	RR	2R	RR
China Open	A	A	LQ	LQ	LQ	LQ	WD	1R	2R	Tournament Not Held							LQ
Wuhan Open	Tournament Not Held													LQ	2R	LQ	WD
British Open	Tournament Not Held											2R	SF	2R	1R	LQ	LQ
English Open	Tournament Not Held						1R	1R	1R	2R	QF	3R	LQ	LQ	LQ	3R	2R
Shenzhen Open (Note: The event was called the Xi'an Grand Prix (2024/2025–2025/2026))	Tournament Not Held														LQ	1R	LQ
Northern Ireland Open	Tournament Not Held						3R	1R	4R	4R	1R	LQ	LQ	3R	LQ	1R	1R
International Championship	Not Held		LQ	LQ	1R	1R	1R	QF	LQ	1R	Not Held			1R	2R	LQ	1R
UK Championship	A	A	LQ	2R	2R	3R	2R	2R	1R	2R	2R	2R	LQ	LQ	LQ	LQ	
Shoot Out	Non-Ranking Event						1R	A	1R	A	2R	SF	2R	2R	4R	A	
Scottish Open	Not Held		MR	Not Held			1R	1R	2R	1R	4R	1R	1R	1R	2R	1R	
German Masters	A	A	LQ	LQ	LQ	LQ	LQ	LQ	LQ	2R	2R	LQ	LQ	1R	LQ	LQ	
Welsh Open	A	A	LQ	1R	1R	2R	4R	3R	4R	2R	1R	1R	3R	3R	2R	3R	
World Grand Prix	Tournament Not Held				NR	DNQ	DNQ	DNQ	DNQ	DNQ	1R	DNQ	1R	DNQ	DNQ	DNQ	
Players Championship (Note: The event was called the Players Tour Championship Grand Final (2010/2011–2015/2016))	DNQ	DNQ	DNQ	DNQ	DNQ	DNQ	DNQ	DNQ	DNQ	DNQ	DNQ	DNQ	DNQ	DNQ	DNQ	DNQ	
World Open	A	A	LQ	LQ	Not Held		1R	LQ	1R	1R	Not Held			2R	2R	3R	
Tour Championship	Tournament Not Held								DNQ	DNQ	DNQ	DNQ	DNQ	DNQ	DNQ	DNQ	
World Championship	A	A	LQ	1R	1R	1R	LQ	LQ	LQ	LQ	LQ	LQ	LQ	1R	LQ	LQ	
Non-ranking tournaments
Championship League	A	A	A	A	A	A	A	A	A	RR	A	A	A	A	A	A	
Former ranking tournaments
Wuxi Classic	Non-Ranking		LQ	LQ	1R	Tournament Not Held											
Australian Goldfields Open	NH	A	LQ	LQ	LQ	LQ	Tournament Not Held										
Shanghai Masters	A	A	LQ	LQ	LQ	LQ	LQ	2R	Non-Ranking		Not Held			Non-Ranking Event			
Paul Hunter Classic	Minor-Ranking Event						4R	2R	1R	NR	Tournament Not Held						
Indian Open	Not Held			SF	LQ	NH	1R	LQ	LQ	Tournament Not Held							
Riga Masters (Note: The event was called the Riga Open (2014/2015–2015/2016))	Tournament Not Held				Minor-Rank		LQ	3R	1R	LQ	Tournament Not Held						
China Championship	Tournament Not Held						NR	LQ	LQ	1R	Tournament Not Held						
WST Pro Series	Tournament Not Held										RR	Tournament Not Held					
Gibraltar Open	Tournament Not Held					MR	1R	2R	1R	1R	1R	2R	Tournament Not Held				
WST Classic	Tournament Not Held												4R	Tournament Not Held			
European Masters	Tournament Not Held						LQ	LQ	LQ	1R	2R	LQ	LQ	2R	Not Held		
Saudi Arabia Masters	Tournament Not Held														3R	3R	NH
Former non-ranking tournaments
Shoot Out	A	A	2R	2R	A	A	Ranking Event										
Six-red World Championship	A	A	A	A	A	A	A	A	A	A	Not Held		LQ	Tournament Not Held			

Performance Table Legend
LQ	lost in the qualifying draw	#R	lost in the early rounds of the tournament (WR = Wildcard round, RR = Round robin)	QF	lost in the quarter-finals
SF	lost in the semi-finals	F	lost in the final	W	won the tournament
DNQ	did not qualify for the tournament	A	did not participate in the tournament	WD	withdrew from the tournament

NH / Not Held	means an event was not held.
NR / Non-Ranking Event	means an event is/was no longer a ranking event.
R / Ranking Event	means an event is/was a ranking event.
MR / Minor-Ranking Event	means an event is/was a minor-ranking event.

== Career finals ==
=== Pro-am finals: 2 (1 title) ===
Outcome	No.	Year	Championship	Opponent in the final	Score
Runner-up	1.	2008	Pontins Pro-Am – Event 2	(England) Stuart Bingham	1–4
Winner	1.	2010	Paul Hunter English Open	(England) Stephen Craigie	6–4
