= 2015 World Grand Prix (snooker) =

Snooker tournament in Wales

2015 888.com World Grand Prix
Tournament information
- Dates: 16–22 March 2015
- Venue: Venue Cymru
- City: Llandudno
- Country: Wales
- Organisation: WPBSA
- Format: Non-ranking event
- Total prize fund: £300,000
- Winner's share: £100,000
- Highest break: (England) Judd Trump (142)

Final
- Champion: (England) Judd Trump
- Runner-up: (England) Ronnie O'Sullivan
- Score: 10–7

The 2015 World Grand Prix (officially the 2015 888.com World Grand Prix) was a professional non-ranking snooker tournament that took place between 16 and 22 March 2015 at the Venue Cymru in Llandudno, Wales.

Judd Trump won the inaugural event by defeating Ronnie O'Sullivan 10–7 in the final.

== Prize fund ==
The breakdown of prize money for this year is shown below:

- Winner: £100,000
- Runner-up: £35,000
- Semi-final: £20,000
- Quarter-final: £10,000
- Last 16: £5,000
- Last 32: £2,500
- Highest break: £5,000
- Total: £300,000

== Seeding list ==
The top 32 players on a one-year ranking system running from the 2014 World Snooker Championship to the 2015 Gdynia Open qualified for the tournament.

Rank	Player	Total points
1	(England) Mark Selby	429,166
2	(England) Ronnie O'Sullivan	305,250
3	(Australia) Neil Robertson	217,360
4	(England) Judd Trump	191,916
5	(England) Ricky Walden	188,227
6	(England) Stuart Bingham	176,545
7	(Northern Ireland) Mark Allen	163,500
8	(England) Shaun Murphy	150,083
9	(Scotland) Stephen Maguire	115,700
10	(Scotland) John Higgins	103,450
11	(England) Barry Hawkins	102,000
12	(Wales) Mark Williams	99,400
13	(England) Joe Perry	94,833
14	(Hong Kong) Marco Fu	85,266
15	(England) Robert Milkins	79,444
16	(England) Martin Gould	76,834
17	(Scotland) Alan McManus	70,001
18	(Wales) Michael White	63,333
19	(England) Mark Davis	61,127
20	(England) Ben Woollaston	60,699
21	(Wales) Ryan Day	59,582
22	(England) Matthew Selt	55,900
23	(Scotland) Graeme Dott	55,033
24	(China) Xiao Guodong	52,295
25	(England) Peter Ebdon	51,917
26	(China) Liang Wenbo	51 251
27	(Scotland) Anthony McGill	49,167
28	(China) Ding Junhui	48,500
29	(Wales) Dominic Dale	47,583
30	(Belgium) Luca Brecel	45,332
31	(England) Rod Lawler	42,499
32	(England) Michael Holt	42,083

== Main draw ==
Last 32; Best of 7 frames
1	(England) Mark Selby	4
32	(England) Michael Holt	1
16	(England) Martin Gould	4
17	(Scotland) Alan McManus	1
9	(Scotland) Stephen Maguire	4
24	(China) Xiao Guodong	1
8	(England) Shaun Murphy	3
25	(England) Peter Ebdon	4
5	(England) Ricky Walden	4
28	(China) Ding Junhui	1
12	(Wales) Mark Williams	4
21	(Wales) Ryan Day	3
13	(England) Joe Perry	4
20	(England) Ben Woollaston	0
4	(England) Judd Trump	4
29	(Wales) Dominic Dale	0
3	(Australia) Neil Robertson	4
30	(Belgium) Luca Brecel	0
14	(Hong Kong) Marco Fu	1
19	(England) Mark Davis	4
11	(England) Barry Hawkins	0
22	(England) Matthew Selt	4
6	(England) Stuart Bingham	4
27	(Scotland) Anthony McGill	3
7	(Northern Ireland) Mark Allen	3
26	(China) Liang Wenbo	4
10	(Scotland) John Higgins	3
23	(Scotland) Graeme Dott	4
15	(England) Robert Milkins	4
18	(Wales) Michael White	2
2	(England) Ronnie O'Sullivan	4
31	(England) Rod Lawler	2

Last 16; Best of 7 frames
1	(England) Mark Selby	2
16	(England) Martin Gould	4
9	(Scotland) Stephen Maguire	1
25	(England) Peter Ebdon	4
5	(England) Ricky Walden	3
12	(Wales) Mark Williams	4
13	(England) Joe Perry	2
4	(England) Judd Trump	4
3	(Australia) Neil Robertson	3
19	(England) Mark Davis	4
22	(England) Matthew Selt	2
6	(England) Stuart Bingham	4
26	(China) Liang Wenbo	3
23	(Scotland) Graeme Dott	4
15	(England) Robert Milkins	0
2	(England) Ronnie O'Sullivan	4

Quarter-finals; Best of 7 frames
16	(England) Martin Gould	4
25	(England) Peter Ebdon	2
12	(Wales) Mark Williams	3
4	(England) Judd Trump	4
19	(England) Mark Davis	0
6	(England) Stuart Bingham	4
23	(Scotland) Graeme Dott	1
2	(England) Ronnie O'Sullivan	4

Semi-finals; Best of 11 frames
16	(England) Martin Gould	5
4	(England) Judd Trump	6
6	(England) Stuart Bingham	0
2	(England) Ronnie O'Sullivan	6

Final; Best of 19 frames
4	(England) Judd Trump	10
2	(England) Ronnie O'Sullivan	7

== Final ==
Final: Best of 19 frames. Referee: Olivier Marteel. Venue Cymru, Llandudno, Wales, 22 March 2015.
Judd Trump (4); England	10–7	Ronnie O'Sullivan (2); England
Afternoon: 67–54, 14–90 (90), 60–80, 47–83 (56), 1–105 (105), 86–22 (50), 82–1, 76–8 (50), 9–115 (89); Evening: 0–100 (96), 20–63 (59), 80–29 (57), 72–0, 142–0 (142), 67–35, 62–53, 65–9
142	Highest break	105
1	Century breaks	1
4	50+ breaks	6

== Century breaks ==
Total: 17

- 142, 140, 121 – Judd Trump
- 139 – Joe Perry
- 136 – Peter Ebdon
- 122, 108, 106 – Stephen Maguire
- 121 – Neil Robertson
- 115 – Rod Lawler
- 113, 111 – Martin Gould
- 110 – Mark Selby
- 109, 102 – Mark Davis
- 105 – Ronnie O'Sullivan
- 101 – Stuart Bingham
