= 2015 Players Tour Championship Grand Final =

Tournament information
- Dates: 24–28 March 2015
- Venue: Montien Riverside Hotel
- City: Bangkok
- Country: Thailand
- Organisation: World Snooker
- Format: Ranking event
- Total prize fund: £350,000
- Winner's share: £100,000
- Highest break: Neil Robertson (AUS) (138)

Final
- Champion: Joe Perry (ENG)
- Runner-up: Mark Williams (WAL)
- Score: 4–3

The 2015 Players Tour Championship Grand Final was a professional ranking snooker tournament that took place between 24 and 28 March 2015 at the Montien Riverside Hotel in Bangkok, Thailand. It was the ninth ranking event of the 2014/2015 season.

Barry Hawkins was the defending champion, but he lost 2–4 against Mark King in the last 32.

Joe Perry won his first ranking event by defeating Mark Williams 4–3 in the final.

== Prize fund ==
The total prize money of the event was raised to £350,000 from the previous year's £300,000. The breakdown of prize money of the event is shown below:

	Prize fund
Winner	£100,000
Runner-up	£38,000
Semi-finalist	£20,000
Quarter-finalist	£12,500
Last 16	£7,000
Last 32	£4,000
Highest break	£2,000
Total	£350,000

== Seeding list ==
The players competed in 9 minor-ranking tournaments to earn points for the European Tour and Asian Tour Order of Merits. The seeding list of the Finals was based on the combined list from the earnings of both Order of Merits.

Rank	Player	European Tour	Asian Tour	Total points
1	Shaun Murphy (ENG)	48,249	0	48,249
2	Mark Allen (NIR)	31,833	0	31,833
3	Stephen Maguire (SCO)	29,333	200	29,533
4	Mark Selby (ENG)	28,499	0	28,499
5	Neil Robertson (AUS)	27,249	0	27,249
6	Judd Trump (ENG)	26,916	0	26,916
7	Joe Perry (ENG)	9,166	12,000	21,166
8	Robert Milkins (ENG)	17,750	2,500	20,250
9	Mark Williams (WAL)	16,250	2,900	19,150
10	Matthew Selt (ENG)	15,500	2,900	18 400
11	Stuart Bingham (ENG)	6,334	10,600	16,934
12	Jimmy Robertson (ENG)	10,083	3,500	13,583
13	Peter Ebdon (ENG)	11,833	1,500	13,333
14	Mark Davis (ENG)	12,416	600	13,016
15	Martin Gould (ENG)	12,500	0	12,500
16	Barry Hawkins (ENG)	12,000	0	12,000
17	Ding Junhui (CHN)	0	11,500	11,500
18	Oliver Lines (ENG)	4,500	6,000	10,500
19	Rod Lawler (ENG)	10,499	0	10,499
20	Luca Brecel (BEL)	9,832	0	9,832
21	Thepchaiya Un-Nooh (THA)	3,332	6,200	9,532
22	Ricky Walden (ENG)	9,083	200	9,283
23	Alan McManus (SCO)	9,084	0	9,084
24	Michael Holt (ENG)	3,583	5,000	8,583
25	Michael White (WAL)	8,583	0	8,583
26	Mark King (ENG)	7,000	1,400	8,400
27	Marco Fu (HKG)	7,416	600	8,016
28	Anthony McGill (SCO)	8,000	0	8,000
29	Ryan Day (WAL)	3,749	4,000	7,749
30	Chris Wakelin (ENG)	7,416	0	7,416
31	John Higgins (SCO)	6,583	200	6,783
32	Dominic Dale (WAL)	6,583	0	6,583

== Tournament draw ==
Last 32; Best of 7 frames
1	Shaun Murphy (ENG)	4
19	Rod Lawler (ENG)	2
15	Martin Gould (ENG)	4
25	Michael White (WAL)	3
16	Barry Hawkins (ENG)	2
26	Mark King (ENG)	4
6	Judd Trump (ENG)	4
20	Luca Brecel (BEL)	0
8	Robert Milkins (ENG)	0
30	Chris Wakelin (ENG)	4
10	Matthew Selt (ENG)	4
18	Oliver Lines (ENG)	1
9	Mark Williams (WAL)	4
21	Thepchaiya Un-Nooh (THA)	1
4	Mark Selby (ENG)	4
32	Dominic Dale (WAL)	0
3	Stephen Maguire (SCO)	4
31	John Higgins (SCO)	3
12	Jimmy Robertson (ENG)	2
24	Michael Holt (ENG)	4
13	Peter Ebdon (ENG)	1
28	Anthony McGill (SCO)	4
7	Joe Perry (ENG)	4
17	Ding Junhui (CHN)	1
5	Neil Robertson (AUS)	4
27	Marco Fu (HKG)	3
14	Mark Davis (ENG)	4
22	Ricky Walden (ENG)	2
11	Stuart Bingham (ENG)	4
23	Alan McManus (SCO)	1
2	Mark Allen (NIR)	4
29	Ryan Day (WAL)	3

Last 16; Best of 7 frames
1	(England) Shaun Murphy	2
15	(England) Martin Gould	4
26	(England) Mark King	2
6	(England) Judd Trump	4
30	(England) Chris Wakelin	2
10	(England) Matthew Selt	4
9	(Wales) Mark Williams	4
4	(England) Mark Selby	3
3	(Scotland) Stephen Maguire	3
24	(England) Michael Holt	4
28	(Scotland) Anthony McGill	3
7	(England) Joe Perry	4
5	(Australia) Neil Robertson	1
14	(England) Mark Davis	4
11	(England) Stuart Bingham	4
2	(Northern Ireland) Mark Allen	2

Quarter-finals; Best of 7 frames
15	(England) Martin Gould	2
6	(England) Judd Trump	4
10	(England) Matthew Selt	3
9	(Wales) Mark Williams	4
24	(England) Michael Holt	1
7	(England) Joe Perry	4
14	(England) Mark Davis	1
11	(England) Stuart Bingham	4

Semi-finals; Best of 7 frames
6	(England) Judd Trump	2
9	(Wales) Mark Williams	4
7	(England) Joe Perry	4
11	(England) Stuart Bingham	1

Final; Best of 7 frames
9	(Wales) Mark Williams	3
7	(England) Joe Perry	4

== Final ==
Final: Best of 7 frames. Referee: Paul Collier. Montien Riverside Hotel, Bangkok, Thailand, 28 March 2015.
Mark Williams (9); Wales	3–4	Joe Perry (7); England
73–22 (64), 80–0 (57), 103–30 (103), 15–64, 0–68 (50), 21–59 (56), 7–78 (54)
103	Highest break	56
1	Century breaks	0
3	50+ breaks	3

== Century breaks ==
- 138 – Neil Robertson
- 119 – Peter Ebdon
- 118, 106, 103 – Mark Williams
- 115 – Stephen Maguire
- 102 – Judd Trump
- 101 – Mark Allen
- 101 – Stuart Bingham
