= European Tour 2014/2015 – Event 4 =

European Tour 2014/2015 Event 4

Tournament information
- Dates: 19–23 November 2014
- Venue: RWE-Sporthalle
- City: Mülheim
- Country: Germany
- Organisation: World Snooker
- Format: Minor-ranking event
- Total prize fund: €126,265
- Winner's share: €25,000
- Highest break: Shaun Murphy (ENG) (147)

Final
- Champion: Shaun Murphy (ENG)
- Runner-up: Robert Milkins (ENG)
- Score: 4–0

The European Tour 2014/2015 – Event 4 (also known as the 2014 Kreativ Dental Ruhr Open) was a professional minor-ranking snooker tournament that took place between 19 and 23 November 2014 at the RWE-Sporthalle in Mülheim, Germany.

Mark Allen was the defending champion, but he lost 0–4 against Stuart Carrington in the last 32.

Shaun Murphy won his fourth professional title of the calendar year by defeating Robert Milkins 4–0 in the final. During the final Murphy made the 108th official maximum break, becoming the first player to make three maximums in a calendar year.

== Prize fund ==
The breakdown of prize money of the event is shown below:

	Prize fund
Winner	€25,000
Runner-up	€12,000
Semi-finalist	€6,000
Quarter-finalist	€4,000
Last 16	€2,300
Last 32	€1,200
Last 64	€700
Maximum break	€1,265
Total	€126,265

== Main draw ==
=== Preliminary rounds ===
==== Round 1 ====
Best of 7 frames

(Germany) Deitmar Juschka	0–4	(England) Jake Nicholson
(Netherlands) Kevin Chan	0–4	(Scotland) Eden Sharav
(Germany) Michael Buchholz	0–4	(Belgium) Daan Leysen
(Netherlands) Marinus Teerling	w/o–w/d	(Scotland) Rhys Clark
(Republic of Ireland) Gary Ryan	2–4	(England) Joshua Baddeley
(England) Matthew Hulatt	2–4	(Northern Ireland) Billy Brown
(Germany) Rolf Mahr	0–4	(England) Matthew Day
(Northern Ireland) Conor McCormack	0–4	(England) Joe O'Connor
(Republic of Ireland) John Sutton	3–4	(Wales) Kishan Hirani
(Germany) Michael Deutschmann	1–4	(Belgium) Kristof Vermeiren
(England) Paul Davison	4–0	(England) Mitchell Travis
(England) Richard Beckham	4–0	(Germany) Joerg Petersen
(England) Brandon Sargeant	4–1	(Isle of Man) Darryl Hill
(England) Aaron Cook	0–4	(Wales) Daniel Wells
(Belgium) Dennis Deroose	3–4	(Russia) Karen Osipov
(England) Ashley Hugill	0–4	(England) Sydney Wilson
(Germany) Jörg Schneidewindt	1–4	(Republic of Ireland) Thomas Dowling
(England) Joe Steele	4–2	(Netherlands) Raymon Fabrie
(Netherlands) Marko Reijers	1–4	(England) Adam Edge

(Belgium) Hans Blanckaert	3–4	(Wales) Ben Jones
(England) Jeff Cundy	4–1	(England) Martin O'Donnell
(Republic of Ireland) Dessie Sheehan	4–1	(England) Jayson Wholly
(Denmark) Ejler Hame	0–4	(England) Adam Duffy
(England) Luke Garland	4–3	(England) Louis Heathcote
(Iceland) Sigurdur Kristjansson	0–4	(England) Sean O'Sullivan
(England) Matthew Glasby	4–0	(Germany) Andreas Steinborn
(Netherlands) Jerom Meeus	0–4	(Republic of Ireland) Mark Dooley
(Portugal) Francisco Domingues	4–0	(Bangladesh) Ferdous Bhuiyan
(Scotland) Marc Davis	4–0	(Germany) Miro Popovic
(Germany) Kemal Ueruen	0–4	(Malta) Brian Cini
(Netherlands) Manon Melief	0–4	(Scotland) Ross Higgins
(Germany) Dirk Kunze	1–4	(Wales) Alex Taubman
(England) Christopher Keogan	2–4	(Belgium) Phuntsok Jaegers
(England) Adam Bobat	4–2	(Latvia) Maris Volajs
(Germany) Markus Fischer	1–4	(Russia) Aleksandr Kurgankov
(England) Richard Jones	4–1	(Belgium) Jeff Jacobs
(Austria) Andreas Ploner	w/o–w/d	(England) Clayton Humphries

==== Round 2 ====
Best of 7 frames

(England) Jake Nicholson	1–4	(Scotland) Eden Sharav
(England) Zack Richardson	4–0	(Belgium) Daan Leysen
(Netherlands) Marinus Teerling	0–4	(England) Joshua Baddeley
(Northern Ireland) Billy Brown	2–4	(England) Matthew Day
(England) Joe O'Connor	3–4	(Wales) Kishan Hirani
(Belgium) Kristof Vermeiren	0–4	(England) Paul Davison
(England) Reanne Evans	3–4	(England) Richard Beckham
(Germany) Diana Schuler	0–4	(England) Brandon Sargeant
(Wales) Daniel Wells	4–1	(Russia) Karen Osipov
(England) Sydney Wilson	4–2	(Republic of Ireland) Thomas Dowling
(England) Michael Williams	4–0	(England) Joe Steele
(England) Adam Edge	1–4	(Wales) Ben Jones
(England) Nico Elton	2–4	(England) Jeff Cundy

(England) Ashley Carty	4–0	(Republic of Ireland) Dessie Sheehan
(Ukraine) Sergiy Isayenko	0–4	(England) Adam Duffy
(England) Luke Garland	4–3	(England) Sean O'Sullivan
(England) Matthew Glasby	4–3	(Republic of Ireland) Mark Dooley
(Portugal) Francisco Domingues	0–4	(Scotland) Marc Davis
(Poland) Kacper Filipiak	4–1	(Malta) Brian Cini
(England) Andy Marriott	3–4	(Scotland) Ross Higgins
(Wales) Alex Taubman	3–4	(Belgium) Phuntsok Jaegers
(England) John Chapman	0–4	(England) Adam Bobat
(Wales) Jack Bradford	4–0	(Russia) Aleksandr Kurgankov
(Netherlands) Roel Laverman	0–4	(England) Richard Jones
(England) Daniel Ward	0–4	(Austria) Andreas Ploner

=== Main rounds ===
==== Top half ====
===== Section 1 =====
Last 128; Best of 7 frames
(Northern Ireland) Mark Allen	4
(England) Hammad Miah	3
(England) Mark Joyce	4
(Scotland) Eden Sharav	3
(England) Anthony Hamilton	4
(England) Zak Surety	2
(England) James Cahill	2
(England) Stuart Carrington	4
(England) Robbie Williams	4
(England) Zack Richardson	3
(England) Gary Wilson	2
(England) Lee Page	4
(England) Elliot Slessor	4
(England) Joshua Baddeley	1
(England) Rod Lawler	4
(England) Matthew Day	2

Last 64; Best of 7 frames
(Northern Ireland) Mark Allen	4
(England) Mark Joyce	2
(England) Anthony Hamilton	3
(England) Stuart Carrington	4
(England) Robbie Williams	3
(England) Lee Page	4
(England) Elliot Slessor	0
(England) Rod Lawler	4

Last 32; Best of 7 frames
(Northern Ireland) Mark Allen	0
(England) Stuart Carrington	4
(England) Lee Page	1
(England) Rod Lawler	4

Last 16; Best of 7 frames
(England) Stuart Carrington	3
(England) Rod Lawler	4

===== Section 2 =====
Last 128; Best of 7 frames
(England) Robert Milkins	4
(China) Cao Xinlong	1
(England) Ben Woollaston	4
(Scotland) Ross Muir	2
(England) Jack Lisowski	3
(England) Peter Lines	4
(Wales) Jamie Jones	4
(Switzerland) Alexander Ursenbacher	0
(India) Aditya Mehta	4
(Wales) Kishan Hirani	2
(Wales) Dominic Dale	4
(England) Paul Davison	2
(England) Andrew Higginson	4
(England) Richard Beckham	0
(Scotland) Anthony McGill	0
(China) Zhang Anda	4

Last 64; Best of 7 frames
(England) Robert Milkins	4
(England) Ben Woollaston	2
(England) Peter Lines	4
(Wales) Jamie Jones	2
(India) Aditya Mehta	3
(Wales) Dominic Dale	4
(England) Andrew Higginson	4
(China) Zhang Anda	1

Last 32; Best of 7 frames
(England) Robert Milkins	4
(England) Peter Lines	3
(Wales) Dominic Dale	1
(England) Andrew Higginson	4

Last 16; Best of 7 frames
(England) Robert Milkins	4
(England) Andrew Higginson	2

===== Section 3 =====
Last 128; Best of 7 frames
(England) Barry Hawkins	1
(England) Craig Steadman	4
(Wales) Andrew Pagett	2
(England) David Grace	4
(Wales) Jak Jones	4
(China) Lyu Haotian	2
(Australia) Neil Robertson	4
(Thailand) Noppon Saengkham	2
(China) Liang Wenbo	4
(England) Alfie Burden	1
(England) Oliver Lines	4
(England) Brandon Sargeant	2
(Wales) Ryan Day	4
(Scotland) Michael Leslie	1
(England) Jimmy Robertson	4
(Wales) Daniel Wells	1

Last 64; Best of 7 frames
(England) Craig Steadman	4
(England) David Grace	1
(Wales) Jak Jones	0
(Australia) Neil Robertson	4
(China) Liang Wenbo	4
(England) Oliver Lines	1
(Wales) Ryan Day	3
(England) Jimmy Robertson	4

Last 32; Best of 7 frames
(England) Craig Steadman	2
(Australia) Neil Robertson	4
(China) Liang Wenbo	4
(England) Jimmy Robertson	3

Last 16; Best of 7 frames
(Australia) Neil Robertson	4
(China) Liang Wenbo	3

===== Section 4 =====
Last 128; Best of 7 frames
(Belgium) Luca Brecel	4
(England) Sydney Wilson	0
(Norway) Kurt Maflin	0
(China) Cao Yupeng	4
(England) Stuart Bingham	4
(England) Joel Walker	3
(Scotland) Graeme Dott	3
(Republic of Ireland) Ken Doherty	4
(Scotland) Stephen Maguire	4
(England) Mitchell Mann	2
(England) Liam Highfield	4
(England) Alex Davies	0
(England) Chris Melling	4
(Qatar) Ahmed Saif	0
(England) Peter Ebdon	4
(England) Michael Williams	0

Last 64; Best of 7 frames
(Belgium) Luca Brecel	4
(China) Cao Yupeng	2
(England) Stuart Bingham	4
(Republic of Ireland) Ken Doherty	0
(Scotland) Stephen Maguire	4
(England) Liam Highfield	3
(England) Chris Melling	4
(England) Peter Ebdon	2

Last 32; Best of 7 frames
(Belgium) Luca Brecel	3
(England) Stuart Bingham	4
(Scotland) Stephen Maguire	4
(England) Chris Melling	2

Last 16; Best of 7 frames
(England) Stuart Bingham	1
(Scotland) Stephen Maguire	4

==== Bottom half ====
===== Section 5 =====
Last 128; Best of 7 frames
(England) Judd Trump	4
(England) Rory McLeod	0
(England) Sam Baird	4
(China) Yu Delu	0
(England) Kyren Wilson	4
(Wales) Ben Jones	0
(England) Matthew Selt	4
(Malta) Alex Borg	2
(Scotland) Fraser Patrick	4
(England) Jeff Cundy	2
(Scotland) Scott Donaldson	4
(China) Li Hang	1
(Scotland) John Higgins	4
(Australia) Vinnie Calabrese	2
(Hong Kong) Marco Fu	w/o
(England) Barry Pinches	w/d

Last 64; Best of 7 frames
(England) Judd Trump	4
(England) Sam Baird	2
(England) Kyren Wilson	0
(England) Matthew Selt	4
(Scotland) Fraser Patrick	4
(Scotland) Scott Donaldson	2
(Scotland) John Higgins	0
(Hong Kong) Marco Fu	4

Last 32; Best of 7 frames
(England) Judd Trump	4
(England) Matthew Selt	2
(Scotland) Fraser Patrick	3
(Hong Kong) Marco Fu	4

Last 16; Best of 7 frames
(England) Judd Trump	4
(Hong Kong) Marco Fu	3

===== Section 6 =====
Last 128; Best of 7 frames
(England) Michael Wasley	4
(England) Ashley Carty	3
(England) Joe Perry	4
(Thailand) Ratchayothin Yotharuck	3
(England) Allan Taylor	1
(England) Adam Duffy	4
(Republic of Ireland) Fergal O'Brien	4
(England) Luke Garland	1
(England) Chris Wakelin	4
(England) Matthew Glasby	3
(Wales) Matthew Stevens	4
(Republic of Ireland) David Morris	1
(Thailand) Thepchaiya Un-Nooh	4
(England) John Astley	1
(Wales) Michael White	w/o
(China) Rouzi Maimaiti	n/s

Last 64; Best of 7 frames
(England) Michael Wasley	4
(England) Joe Perry	1
(England) Adam Duffy	1
(Republic of Ireland) Fergal O'Brien	4
(England) Chris Wakelin	4
(Wales) Matthew Stevens	1
(Thailand) Thepchaiya Un-Nooh	4
(Wales) Michael White	0

Last 32; Best of 7 frames
(England) Michael Wasley	0
(Republic of Ireland) Fergal O'Brien	4
(England) Chris Wakelin	4
(Thailand) Thepchaiya Un-Nooh	3

Last 16; Best of 7 frames
(Republic of Ireland) Fergal O'Brien	2
(England) Chris Wakelin	4

===== Section 7 =====
Last 128; Best of 7 frames
(England) Mark Davis	4
(England) Ian Burns	1
(England) Nigel Bond	4
(Scotland) Marc Davis	1
(Wales) Mark Williams	4
(England) Tom Ford	3
(Northern Ireland) Gerard Greene	2
(Poland) Kacper Filipiak	4
(England) Jimmy White	1
(China) Zhou Yuelong	4
(England) Ian Glover	4
(Scotland) Ross Higgins	2
(Malta) Tony Drago	1
(England) Michael Georgiou	4
(England) Mark King	4
(England) Chris Norbury	2

Last 64; Best of 7 frames
(England) Mark Davis	4
(England) Nigel Bond	1
(Wales) Mark Williams	4
(Poland) Kacper Filipiak	1
(China) Zhou Yuelong	4
(England) Ian Glover	0
(England) Michael Georgiou	3
(England) Mark King	4

Last 32; Best of 7 frames
(England) Mark Davis	3
(Wales) Mark Williams	4
(China) Zhou Yuelong	1
(England) Mark King	4

Last 16; Best of 7 frames
(Wales) Mark Williams	4
(England) Mark King	3

===== Section 8 =====
Last 128; Best of 7 frames
(Thailand) Dechawat Poomjaeng	4
(England) Steven Hallworth	3
(England) Jamie Cope	4
(Belgium) Phuntsok Jaegers	1
(Northern Ireland) Joe Swail	4
(England) Adam Bobat	0
(England) Mike Dunn	4
(Wales) Jack Bradford	0
(China) Tian Pengfei	4
(England) Richard Jones	0
(England) David Gilbert	4
(China) Lu Chenwei	1
(England) Michael Holt	4
(Austria) Andreas Ploner	1
(England) Shaun Murphy	4
(China) Lu Ning	2

Last 64; Best of 7 frames
(Thailand) Dechawat Poomjaeng	1
(England) Jamie Cope	4
(Northern Ireland) Joe Swail	4
(England) Mike Dunn	3
(China) Tian Pengfei	3
(England) David Gilbert	4
(England) Michael Holt	2
(England) Shaun Murphy	4

Last 32; Best of 7 frames
(England) Jamie Cope	1
(Northern Ireland) Joe Swail	4
(England) David Gilbert	1
(England) Shaun Murphy	4

Last 16; Best of 7 frames
(Northern Ireland) Joe Swail	3
(England) Shaun Murphy	4

==== Finals ====
Quarter-finals; Best of 7 frames		Semi-finals; Best of 7 frames		Final; Best of 7 frames
(England) Rod Lawler	3
(England) Robert Milkins	4	(England) Robert Milkins	4
(Australia) Neil Robertson	2	(Scotland) Stephen Maguire	1
(Scotland) Stephen Maguire	4			(England) Robert Milkins	0
(England) Judd Trump	4			(England) Shaun Murphy	4
(England) Chris Wakelin	1	(England) Judd Trump	3
(Wales) Mark Williams	2	(England) Shaun Murphy	4
(England) Shaun Murphy	4

== Century breaks ==
- 147, 138, 129, 127, 122, 109, 105, 102 – Shaun Murphy
- 141, 109 – Marco Fu
- 140, 102, 102, 100 – Neil Robertson
- 137 – Chris Melling
- 136 – John Higgins
- 135 – Joe Perry
- 129 – Lu Ning
- 128 – Craig Steadman
- 125 – Robbie Williams
- 124 – Matthew Stevens
- 116 – Sean O'Sullivan
- 116 – Thepchaiya Un-Nooh
- 114 – Liang Wenbo
- 113 – Andrew Higginson
- 112 – Mark Allen
- 112 – Fergal O'Brien
- 112 – Chris Wakelin
- 111, 103 – Judd Trump
- 108 – Robert Milkins
- 108 – Matthew Selt
- 106 – Marc Davis
- 106 – Zack Richardson
- 106 – Zhou Yuelong
- 104 – Mark Joyce
- 104 – David Grace
- 103 – Stuart Bingham
- 102, 101 – Stephen Maguire
- 102 – Jimmy Robertson
- 102 – Cao Yupeng
- 102 – Stuart Carrington
- 101 – Daniel Wells
- 101 – Luke Garland
