= Ruhr Open =

Tournament information
- Venue: RWE-Sporthalle
- Location: Mülheim
- Country: Germany
- Established: 2013
- Organisation(s): World Professional Billiards and Snooker Association
- Format: Minor-ranking event
- Total prize fund: €126,265
- Final year: 2015
- Final champion: (England) Rory McLeod

The Ruhr Open was a minor-ranking snooker tournament, which was part of the Players Tour Championship. The tournament was staged from 2013 to 2015 at the RWE-Sporthalle in Mülheim, Germany. Rory McLeod was the final champion.

== Winners ==
Year	Winner	Runner-up	Final score	Season
2013	(Northern Ireland) Mark Allen	(China) Ding Junhui	4–1	2013/14
2014	(England) Shaun Murphy	(England) Robert Milkins	4–0	2014/15
2015	(England) Rory McLeod	(China) Tian Pengfei	4–2	2015/16

== See also ==
- 2010 Ruhr Championship
