= Asian Tour 2014/2015 – Event 3 =

Asian Tour 2014/2015 Event 3
Tournament information
- Dates: 20–24 January 2015
- Venue: Xuzhou Olympic Center
- City: Xuzhou
- Country: China
- Organisation: World Snooker
- Format: Minor-ranking event
- Total prize fund: £50,000
- Winner's share: £10,000
- Highest break: Thepchaiya Un-Nooh (THA) (136)

Final
- Champion: Joe Perry (ENG)
- Runner-up: Thepchaiya Un-Nooh (THA)
- Score: 4–1

The Asian Tour 2014/2015 – Event 3 (also known as the 2015 Xuzhou Open) was a professional minor-ranking snooker tournament that took place between 20 and 24 January 2015 at the Xuzhou Olympic Center in Xuzhou, China.

Joe Perry won his second minor-ranking event by defeating Thepchaiya Un-Nooh 4–1 in the final. The Xuzhou Open was Un-Nooh's first professional final.

== Prize fund ==
The breakdown of prize money of the event is shown below:

	Prize fund
Winner	£10,000
Runner-up	£5,000
Semi-finalist	£2,500
Quarter-finalist	£1,500
Last 16	£1,000
Last 32	£600
Last 64	£200
Total	£50,000

== Main draw ==
=== Main rounds ===
==== Top half ====
===== Section 1 =====
Last 128; Best of 7 frames
(China) Niu Zhuang	4
(China) Meng Jing	0
(China) Hu Hao	4
(China) Wang Peng	0
(China) Cao Yupeng	4
(China) Liu Jiaming	3
(England) Alfie Burden	4
(China) Wang Linkai	0
(China) Luo Honghao	4
(China) Fan Zhengyi	2
(China) Guan Zhen	4
(China) Mai Hemuti	2

Last 64; Best of 7 frames
(England) Matthew Selt	1
(China) Niu Zhuang	4
(China) Hu Hao	0
(China) Cao Yupeng	4
(England) Alfie Burden	4
(China) Luo Honghao	1
(China) Guan Zhen	1
(England) Ben Woollaston	4

Last 32; Best of 7 frames
(China) Niu Zhuang	4
(China) Cao Yupeng	3
(England) Alfie Burden	4
(England) Ben Woollaston	1

Last 16; Best of 7 frames
(China) Niu Zhuang	1
(England) Alfie Burden	4

===== Section 2 =====
Last 128; Best of 7 frames
(China) Ju Reti	4
(China) Song Yang	2
(China) Zhong Lin	4
(China) Gong Xiaoqing	0
(China) Mei Xiwen	4
(China) Li Weixue	0
(England) Tom Ford	4
(China) Min Changqing	1
(China) Cao Xinlong	4
(China) Tang Li	1
(China) Lin Shuai	4
(China) Qin Ge	2
(China) Paruke Aierken	4
(China) Feng Yu	0

Last 64; Best of 7 frames
(China) Ju Reti	4
(China) Zhong Lin	3
(China) Mei Xiwen	1
(England) Tom Ford	4
(China) Cao Xinlong	4
(China) Lin Shuai	3
(China) Paruke Aierken	2
(China) Tian Pengfei	4

Last 32; Best of 7 frames
(China) Ju Reti	3
(England) Tom Ford	4
(China) Cao Xinlong	0
(China) Tian Pengfei	4

Last 16; Best of 7 frames
(England) Tom Ford	4
(China) Tian Pengfei	1

===== Section 3 =====
Last 128; Best of 7 frames
(China) Huang Jiahao	4
(China) Sun Hongrui	3
(China) Wang Zepeng	4
(China) Zhou Fei	1
(Belgium) Luca Brecel	w/d
(China) Ma Yinzhu	w/o
(England) Elliot Slessor	4
(Hong Kong) Lee Tszho	1
(China) Tang Jun	4
(China) A Bulajiang	2
(China) Zhao Xintong	3
(England) Paul Davison	4

Last 64; Best of 7 frames
(England) Joe Perry	4
(China) Huang Jiahao	0
(China) Wang Zepeng	4
(China) Ma Yinzhu	3
(England) Elliot Slessor	4
(China) Tang Jun	3
(England) Paul Davison	1
(Scotland) Graeme Dott	4

Last 32; Best of 7 frames
(England) Joe Perry	4
(China) Wang Zepeng	2
(England) Elliot Slessor	4
(Scotland) Graeme Dott	2

Last 16; Best of 7 frames
(England) Joe Perry	4
(England) Elliot Slessor	0

===== Section 4 =====
Last 128; Best of 7 frames
(China) Lu Ning	4
(China) Liu Genxiang	0
(Qatar) Ahmed Saif	4
(China) Long Yun	0
(China) Shan Xianshu	3
(China) Sun Peng	4
(China) Rouzi Maimaiti	4
(China) Li Yan	1
(England) Gary Wilson	4
(China) Li Jiahao	0
(Hong Kong) Au Chi-wai	4
(China) Dong Yong	2
(England) Sean O'Sullivan	4
(China) Wu Shengguang	0

Last 64; Best of 7 frames
(China) Lu Ning	4
(Qatar) Ahmed Saif	1
(China) Sun Peng	2
(China) Rouzi Maimaiti	4
(England) Gary Wilson	2
(Hong Kong) Au Chi-wai	4
(England) Sean O'Sullivan	4
(Scotland) Scott Donaldson	3

Last 32; Best of 7 frames
(China) Lu Ning	3
(China) Rouzi Maimaiti	4
(Hong Kong) Au Chi-wai	0
(England) Sean O'Sullivan	4

Last 16; Best of 7 frames
(China) Rouzi Maimaiti	4
(England) Sean O'Sullivan	2

==== Bottom half ====
===== Section 5 =====
Last 128; Best of 7 frames
(China) Wang Yuchen	4
(China) Wang Shi	2
(China) Xu Si	4
(Hong Kong) Wong Yunshing	1
(England) Craig Steadman	4
(China) Qi Guoxiao	3
(China) Lu Chenwei	4
(China) Xu Yuan	3
(China) Ma Bing	4
(China) Li Yingdong	2
(China) Cao Kaisheng	3
(China) Li Jianbing	4
(Thailand) Thepchaiya Un-Nooh	4
(China) Li Ningning	0

Last 64; Best of 7 frames
(China) Li Hang	3
(China) Wang Yuchen	4
(China) Xu Si	2
(England) Craig Steadman	4
(China) Lu Chenwei	1
(China) Ma Bing	4
(China) Li Jianbing	2
(Thailand) Thepchaiya Un-Nooh	4

Last 32; Best of 7 frames
(China) Wang Yuchen	2
(England) Craig Steadman	4
(China) Ma Bing	2
(Thailand) Thepchaiya Un-Nooh	4

Last 16; Best of 7 frames
(England) Craig Steadman	3
(Thailand) Thepchaiya Un-Nooh	4

===== Section 6 =====
Last 128; Best of 7 frames
(China) Zhou Yuelong	4
(United States) Corey Deuel	2
(China) Long Zehuang	0
(China) Ji Zhijun	4
(China) Fang Xiongman	4
(China) Zhang Yadong	0
(China) Zhang Anda	4
(China) Li Zhen	3
(England) Barry Pinches	4
(China) Pang Junxu	2
(China) Chen Junhao	4
(China) Liu Yiqi	1
(China) He Guoqiang	4
(China) Long Yong	1

Last 64; Best of 7 frames
(China) Zhou Yuelong	4
(China) Ji Zhijun	1
(China) Fang Xiongman	4
(China) Zhang Anda	1
(England) Barry Pinches	4
(China) Chen Junhao	1
(China) He Guoqiang	0
(China) Xiao Guodong	4

Last 32; Best of 7 frames
(China) Zhou Yuelong	4
(China) Fang Xiongman	1
(England) Barry Pinches	4
(China) Xiao Guodong	2

Last 16; Best of 7 frames
(China) Zhou Yuelong	4
(England) Barry Pinches	3

===== Section 7 =====
Last 128; Best of 7 frames
(China) Yan Bingtao	2
(China) Li Yujin	4
(China) Chen Zifan	4
(China) Gao Le	0
(Thailand) Noppon Saengkham	3
(China) Geng Mingqi	4
(Wales) Mark Williams	4
(China) Pan Weixing	1
(China) Chen Zhe	4
(China) Feng Zeyuan	2
(China) Chen Feilong	4
(China) Cui Ming	0
(China) Yu Delu	4
(China) Xiong Jun	0

Last 64; Best of 7 frames
(Scotland) Ross Muir	4
(China) Li Yujin	2
(China) Chen Zifan	4
(China) Geng Mingqi	3
(Wales) Mark Williams	4
(China) Chen Zhe	3
(China) Chen Feilong	2
(China) Yu Delu	4

Last 32; Best of 7 frames
(Scotland) Ross Muir	2
(China) Chen Zifan	4
(Wales) Mark Williams	4
(China) Yu Delu	1

Last 16; Best of 7 frames
(China) Chen Zifan	1
(Wales) Mark Williams	4

===== Section 8 =====
Last 128; Best of 7 frames
(Thailand) Dechawat Poomjaeng	4
(China) Ma Tingpeng	1
(China) Zhang Yong	4
(China) Ye Shaojun	0
(China) Cai Jianzhong	3
(China) Li Yuan	4
(China) Lyu Haotian	4
(China) Chen Ruifu	1
(England) Mark King	4
(China) Tu Taojin	2
(China) Wang Heng	3
(China) Jin Long	4
(China) Cheng Sihong	4
(China) He Wenchong	1

Last 64; Best of 7 frames
(Thailand) Dechawat Poomjaeng	1
(China) Zhang Yong	4
(China) Li Yuan	4
(China) Lyu Haotian	3
(England) Mark King	4
(China) Jin Long	2
(China) Cheng Sihong	1
(England) Jimmy Robertson	4

Last 32; Best of 7 frames
(China) Zhang Yong	4
(China) Li Yuan	1
(England) Mark King	2
(England) Jimmy Robertson	4

Last 16; Best of 7 frames
(China) Zhang Yong	4
(England) Jimmy Robertson	3

==== Finals ====
Quarter-finals; Best of 7 frames		Semi-finals; Best of 7 frames		Final; Best of 7 frames
(England) Alfie Burden	2
(England) Tom Ford	4	(England) Tom Ford	3
(England) Joe Perry	4	(England) Joe Perry	4
(China) Rouzi Maimaiti	1			(Northern Ireland) Alex Higgins	4
(Thailand) Thepchaiya Un-Nooh	4			(Thailand) Thepchaiya Un-Nooh	1
(China) Zhou Yuelong	2	(Northern Ireland) Alex Higgins	4
(Wales) Mark Williams	4	(Wales) Mark Williams	1
(China) Zhang Yong	0

== Century breaks ==
- 136, 113, 107 – Thepchaiya Un-Nooh
- 134, 130, 119 – Zhou Yuelong
- 120 – Craig Steadman
- 119, 119 – Sean O'Sullivan
- 119 – Li Yujin
- 110 – Alfie Burden
- 109 – Noppon Saengkham
- 108 – Graeme Dott
- 104 – Mark Williams
- 104 – Joe Perry
- 102 – Fang Xiongman
- 101 – Luo Honghao
