= European Tour 2014/2015 – Event 6 =

European Tour 2014/2015 Event 6

Tournament information
- Dates: 25 February – 1 March 2015
- Venue: Gdynia Sports Arena
- City: Gdynia
- Country: Poland
- Organisation: World Snooker
- Format: Minor-ranking event
- Total prize fund: €125,000
- Winner's share: €25,000
- Highest break: Mark Joyce (ENG) (142); Neil Robertson (AUS) (142); Kurt Maflin (NOR) (142)

Final
- Champion: Neil Robertson (AUS)
- Runner-up: Mark Williams (WAL)
- Score: 4–0

The Kreativ Dental European Tour 2014/2015 – Event 6 (also known as the 2015 Kreativ Dental Gdynia Open) was a professional minor-ranking snooker tournament that took place between 25 February–1 March 2015 at the Gdynia Sports Arena in Gdynia, Poland.

Shaun Murphy was the defending champion, but he lost 2–4 against Neil Robertson in the semi-finals.

Neil Robertson won his fourth minor-ranking event title by defeating Mark Williams 4–0 in the final.

== Prize fund ==
The breakdown of prize money of the event is shown below:

	Prize fund
Winner	€25,000
Runner-up	€12,000
Semi-finalist	€6,000
Quarter-finalist	€4,000
Last 16	€2,300
Last 32	€1,200
Last 64	€700
Total	€125,000

== Main draw ==
=== Preliminary rounds ===
==== Round 1 ====
Best of 7 frames

(Wales) Gareth Allen	4–0	(Poland) Michal Ebert
(Poland) Mateusz Baranowski	4–1	(Poland) Ariel Trebocha
(Poland) Konrad Sor	w/d–w/o	(Poland) Krzysztof Wrobel
(Republic of Ireland) Tony Corrigan	4–0	(Belgium) Jan Bossaert
(England) Kobi Mates	0–4	(England) Paul Davison
(England) Zack Richardson	4–0	(England) Adam Bobat
(Republic of Ireland) Josh Boileau	4–1	(Poland) Bartlomiej Jakobczak
(Northern Ireland) Conor McCormack	0–4	(Finland) Jyri Virtanen
(Serbia) Marko Vukovic	n/s–w/o	(Republic of Ireland) Jason Devaney
(England) Anthony Jeffers	4–1	(Poland) Bartosz Oldakowski
(Poland) Wojciech Przylucki	0–4	(Poland) Patryk Maslowski
(England) Martin O'Donnell	4–3	(Poland) Michal Zielinski
(Norway) Edwin Ingebrigtsen	0–4	(Wales) Ben Jones
(Germany) Daniel Schneider	2–4	(England) Sean O'Sullivan
(Poland) Maciej Maciejwski	0–4	(Denmark) Rune Kampe
(Poland) Przemyslaw Fundament	2–4	(Poland) Przemek Kruk
(England) Joe O'Connor	4–2	(England) Brandon Sargeant

(Poland) Adam Stefanow	2–4	(England) Sanderson Lam
(England) Joshua Baddeley	4–0	(England) Henry Roper
(Finland) Juhana Hautala	4–2	(Poland) Pawel Farynowski
(Latvia) Maris Volajs	2–4	(Scotland) Dylan Craig
(England) Ryan Causton	0–4	(England) Nico Elton
(Wales) Jamie Clarke	4–1	(Scotland) Eden Sharav
(Poland) Maciej Michowski	4–0	(Denmark) Ejler Hame
(England) Ashley Carty	w/o–w/d	(Poland) Maciej Kielkowicz
(Finland) Harri Sillanpää	4–2	(Jordan) Essam Saadeh
(Germany) Lukas Kleckers	w/o–w/d	(Scotland) Michael Collumb
(Northern Ireland) Billy Brown	4–1	(Finland) Iiro Sirkiä
(Sweden) Ron Florax	0–4	(Scotland) Marc Davis
(Wales) Daniel Wells	0–4	(England) Charlie Walters
(England) Joe Steele	3–4	(England) Peter Devlin
(England) Mitchell Travis	4–2	(England) Grant Miles
(England) Richard Beckham	4–1	(England) Luke Garland
(England) Ollie Douglas	4–0	(Poland) Felix Vidler

==== Round 2 ====
Best of 7 frames

(Russia) Aleksandr Kurgankov	0–4	(Wales) Gareth Allen
(Belgium) Jeff Jacobs	1–4	(England) Jason Weston
(Belgium) Tom Snyers	0–4	(Poland) Mateusz Baranowski
(Poland) Michal Matuszczyk	0–4	(Poland) Krzysztof Wrobel
(Scotland) David Greig	4–0	(Sweden) Adrian Gill
(England) Oliver Brown	2–4	(England) Sydney Wilson
(England) Ashley Hugill	4–2	(Republic of Ireland) Tony Corrigan
(Belgium) Kevin Hanssens	2–4	(England) Paul Davison
(Scotland) Ross Higgins	4–3	(England) Zack Richardson
(Poland) Maciej Kusak	1–4	(Republic of Ireland) Josh Boileau
(England) Jayson Wholly	0–4	(Finland) Jyri Virtanen
(Finland) Olli-Pekka Virho	0–4	(Republic of Ireland) Jason Devaney
(England) Jeff Cundy	4–1	(England) Anthony Jeffers
(Poland) Kacper Filipiak	4–3	(Poland) Patryk Maslowski
(Belgium) Phuntsok Jaegers	1–4	(England) Martin O'Donnell
(Belgium) Jurian Heusdens	0–4	(Wales) Ben Jones
(Germany) Sascha Lippe	2–4	(England) Adam Duffy
(Austria) Andreas Ploner	1–4	(England) Sean O'Sullivan
(Finland) Tony Silvan	w/d–w/o	(Denmark) Rune Kampe
(Malta) Brian Cini	4–1	(Poland) Kamil Zubrzycki
(Republic of Ireland) Mark Dooley	4–2	(Poland) Karol Lelek
(England) Christopher Keogan	4–0	(Poland) Jaroslaw Kowalski
(Belgium) Kristof De Mulder	1–4	(Poland) Przemek Kruk

(Poland) Wiktor Doberschütz	0–4	(England) Joe O'Connor
(Poland) Daniel Holoyda	0–4	(England) Sanderson Lam
(Scotland) Chris Totten	4–2	(England) Joshua Baddeley
(Poland) Bartosz Olchowka	4–2	(Finland) Juhana Hautala
(Poland) Phan Quoc Binh	0–4	(Scotland) Dylan Craig
(Poland) Tytus Pawlak	0–4	(England) Nico Elton
(Poland) Antoni Kowalski	0–4	(Wales) Jamie Clarke
(Republic of Ireland) Thomas Dowling	4–1	(Poland) Maciej Michowski
(Republic of Ireland) Dessie Sheehan	1–4	(England) Ashley Carty
(Poland) Konrad Piekarczyk	0–4	(Poland) Marcin Kolibski
(England) Jason Tart	4–0	(Finland) Harri Sillanpää
(Finland) Aki Suutari	0–4	(Estonia) Andres Petrov
(England) William Lemons	w/d–w/o	(Germany) Lukas Kleckers
(Poland) Maciej Sarapuk	w/d–w/o	(Northern Ireland) Billy Brown
(England) Matthew Day	0–4	(Scotland) Marc Davis
(Poland) Janusz Strauch	w/d–w/o	(England) Charlie Walters
(England) Michael Williams	4–2	(Poland) Marcin Nitschke
(Wales) Alex Taubman	w/d–w/o	(England) Peter Devlin
(England) Jaspal Bamotra	w/d–w/o	(England) Mitchell Travis
(Belgium) Hans Blanckaert	n/s–w/o	(England) Richard Beckham
(England) Jeremy Lee	4–1	(Poland) Lukasz Guzowski
(England) Matthew Glasby	1–4	(Wales) Kishan Hirani
(Poland) Rafał Jewtuch	2–4	(England) Ollie Douglas

==== Round 3 ====
Best of 7 frames

(Wales) Gareth Allen	4–2	(England) Jason Weston
(Poland) Mateusz Baranowski	4–3	(Poland) Krzysztof Wrobel
(Scotland) David Greig	4–2	(England) Sydney Wilson
(England) Ashley Hugill	0–4	(England) Paul Davison
(Scotland) Ross Higgins	2–4	(Republic of Ireland) Josh Boileau
(Finland) Jyri Virtanen	2–4	(Republic of Ireland) Jason Devaney
(England) Jeff Cundy	2–4	(Poland) Kacper Filipiak
(England) Martin O'Donnell	1–4	(Wales) Ben Jones
(England) Adam Duffy	4–1	(England) Sean O'Sullivan
(Denmark) Rune Kampe	0–4	(Malta) Brian Cini
(Republic of Ireland) Mark Dooley	1–4	(England) Christopher Keogan
(Poland) Przemek Kruk	0–4	(England) Joe O'Connor

(England) Sanderson Lam	4–2	(Scotland) Chris Totten
(Poland) Bartosz Olchowka	0–4	(Scotland) Dylan Craig
(England) Nico Elton	4–0	(Wales) Jamie Clarke
(Republic of Ireland) Thomas Dowling	4–2	(England) Ashley Carty
(Poland) Marcin Kolibski	0–4	(England) Jason Tart
(Estonia) Andres Petrov	3–4	(Germany) Lukas Kleckers
(Northern Ireland) Billy Brown	2–4	(Scotland) Marc Davis
(England) Charlie Walters	4–3	(England) Michael Williams
(England) Peter Devlin	0–4	(England) Mitchell Travis
(England) Richard Beckham	4–1	(England) Jeremy Lee
(Wales) Kishan Hirani	4–2	(England) Ollie Douglas

=== Main rounds ===
==== Top half ====
===== Section 1 =====
Last 128; Best of 7 frames
(England) Shaun Murphy	w/o
(Wales) Jak Jones	w/d
(England) Allan Taylor	2
(England) Zak Surety	4
(England) Kyren Wilson	4
(Wales) Andrew Pagett	0
(Northern Ireland) Joe Swail	w/o
(China) Zhou Yuelong	w/d
(England) Mark King	4
(England) Dave Harold	2
(Scotland) Graeme Dott	4
(China) Lu Ning	1
(Norway) Kurt Maflin	1
(Wales) Gareth Allen	4
(Scotland) Alan McManus	4
(Poland) Mateusz Baranowski	0

Last 64; Best of 7 frames
(England) Shaun Murphy	4
(England) Zak Surety	0
(England) Kyren Wilson	4
(Northern Ireland) Joe Swail	1
(England) Mark King	1
(Scotland) Graeme Dott	4
(Wales) Gareth Allen	0
(Scotland) Alan McManus	4

Last 32; Best of 7 frames
(England) Shaun Murphy	4
(England) Kyren Wilson	2
(Scotland) Graeme Dott	0
(Scotland) Alan McManus	4

Last 16; Best of 7 frames
(England) Shaun Murphy	4
(Scotland) Alan McManus	0

===== Section 2 =====
Last 128; Best of 7 frames
(Wales) Michael White	4
(England) Mitchell Mann	0
(England) Craig Steadman	4
(Scotland) David Greig	0
(Thailand) Noppon Saengkham	1
(England) Michael Georgiou	4
(Wales) Dominic Dale	4
(England) Paul Davison	3
(Hong Kong) Marco Fu	w/o
(Australia) Vinnie Calabrese	w/d
(England) Chris Melling	4
(England) Chris Norbury	0
(England) Ben Woollaston	4
(England) Barry Pinches	2
(England) Robert Milkins	4
(Republic of Ireland) Josh Boileau	1

Last 64; Best of 7 frames
(Wales) Michael White	4
(England) Craig Steadman	2
(England) Michael Georgiou	1
(Wales) Dominic Dale	4
(Hong Kong) Marco Fu	4
(England) Chris Melling	3
(England) Ben Woollaston	2
(England) Robert Milkins	4

Last 32; Best of 7 frames
(Wales) Michael White	1
(Wales) Dominic Dale	4
(Hong Kong) Marco Fu	3
(England) Robert Milkins	4

Last 16; Best of 7 frames
(Wales) Dominic Dale	0
(England) Robert Milkins	4

===== Section 3 =====
Last 128; Best of 7 frames
(England) Matthew Selt	4
(Switzerland) Alexander Ursenbacher	3
(Thailand) Thepchaiya Un-Nooh	4
(Republic of Ireland) Jason Devaney	0
(England) Oliver Lines	4
(Poland) Kacper Filipiak	0
(Thailand) Dechawat Poomjaeng	4
(Wales) Ben Jones	1
(Australia) Neil Robertson	4
(England) Adam Duffy	3
(England) Anthony Hamilton	4
(Scotland) Michael Leslie	2
(Scotland) Fraser Patrick	2
(Malta) Tony Drago	4
(England) Chris Wakelin	4
(England) David Grace	1

Last 64; Best of 7 frames
(England) Matthew Selt	4
(Thailand) Thepchaiya Un-Nooh	3
(England) Oliver Lines	4
(Thailand) Dechawat Poomjaeng	3
(Australia) Neil Robertson	4
(England) Anthony Hamilton	0
(Malta) Tony Drago	4
(England) Chris Wakelin	2

Last 32; Best of 7 frames
(England) Matthew Selt	3
(England) Oliver Lines	4
(Australia) Neil Robertson	4
(Malta) Tony Drago	0

Last 16; Best of 7 frames
(England) Oliver Lines	3
(Australia) Neil Robertson	4

===== Section 4 =====
Last 128; Best of 7 frames
(England) Ricky Walden	4
(Malta) Brian Cini	3
(England) Mark Joyce	4
(England) Christopher Keogan	1
(England) Jamie Cope	4
(England) Jack Lisowski	1
(Scotland) John Higgins	w/o
(China) Cao Xinlong	w/d
(Wales) Jamie Jones	4
(England) Ian Burns	1
(England) Mike Dunn	w/o
(China) Lyu Haotian	w/d
(England) Jimmy White	1
(Scotland) Jamie Burnett	4
(England) Judd Trump	4
(England) Joe O'Connor	0

Last 64; Best of 7 frames
(England) Ricky Walden	1
(England) Mark Joyce	4
(England) Jamie Cope	1
(Scotland) John Higgins	4
(Wales) Jamie Jones	2
(England) Mike Dunn	4
(Scotland) Jamie Burnett	1
(England) Judd Trump	4

Last 32; Best of 7 frames
(England) Mark Joyce	3
(Scotland) John Higgins	4
(England) Mike Dunn	0
(England) Judd Trump	4

Last 16; Best of 7 frames
(Scotland) John Higgins	2
(England) Judd Trump	4

==== Bottom half ====
===== Section 5 =====
Last 128; Best of 7 frames
(England) Mark Selby	4
(England) Rory McLeod	1
(China) Tian Pengfei	w/d
(England) Sanderson Lam	w/o
(England) Liam Highfield	4
(England) Ian Glover	3
(England) Stuart Bingham	4
(Scotland) Dylan Craig	2
(Wales) Mark Williams	4
(England) Lee Page	2
(England) James Cahill	0
(England) Tom Ford	4
(England) Andrew Higginson	1
(England) Peter Lines	4
(England) Rod Lawler	4
(England) Ali Carter	2

Last 64; Best of 7 frames
(England) Mark Selby	4
(England) Sanderson Lam	0
(England) Liam Highfield	4
(England) Stuart Bingham	2
(Wales) Mark Williams	4
(England) Tom Ford	0
(England) Peter Lines	4
(England) Rod Lawler	3

Last 32; Best of 7 frames
(England) Mark Selby	3
(England) Liam Highfield	4
(Wales) Mark Williams	4
(England) Peter Lines	0

Last 16; Best of 7 frames
(England) Liam Highfield	2
(Wales) Mark Williams	4

===== Section 6 =====
Last 128; Best of 7 frames
(Scotland) Anthony McGill	4
(England) John Astley	1
(England) Gary Wilson	2
(Scotland) Marcus Campbell	4
(China) Xiao Guodong	w/d
(China) Zhang Anda	w/o
(England) Joe Perry	4
(Wales) Matthew Stevens	1
(China) Liang Wenbo	4
(England) Nico Elton	2
(England) Robbie Williams	4
(Republic of Ireland) Thomas Dowling	2
(England) David Gilbert	4
(England) Jason Tart	1
(England) Mark Davis	4
(Germany) Lukas Kleckers	0

Last 64; Best of 7 frames
(Scotland) Anthony McGill	4
(Scotland) Marcus Campbell	1
(China) Zhang Anda	0
(England) Joe Perry	4
(China) Liang Wenbo	4
(England) Robbie Williams	3
(England) David Gilbert	4
(England) Mark Davis	2

Last 32; Best of 7 frames
(Scotland) Anthony McGill	1
(England) Joe Perry	4
(China) Liang Wenbo	1
(England) David Gilbert	4

Last 16; Best of 7 frames
(England) Joe Perry	4
(England) David Gilbert	3

===== Section 7 =====
Last 128; Best of 7 frames
(England) Peter Ebdon	4
(Scotland) Scott Donaldson	1
(England) Sam Baird	w/o
(Qatar) Ahmed Saif	w/d
(England) Elliot Slessor	3
(Scotland) Marc Davis	4
(England) Jimmy Robertson	4
(England) Charlie Walters	1
(Republic of Ireland) Fergal O'Brien	4
(China) Lu Chenwei	1
(Wales) Ryan Day	4
(Republic of Ireland) Ken Doherty	1
(Northern Ireland) Gerard Greene	4
(England) Alfie Burden	0
(England) Martin Gould	4
(England) Mitchell Travis	0

Last 64; Best of 7 frames
(England) Peter Ebdon	4
(England) Sam Baird	2
(Scotland) Marc Davis	0
(England) Jimmy Robertson	4
(Republic of Ireland) Fergal O'Brien	4
(Wales) Ryan Day	1
(Northern Ireland) Gerard Greene	2
(England) Martin Gould	4

Last 32; Best of 7 frames
(England) Peter Ebdon	1
(England) Jimmy Robertson	4
(Republic of Ireland) Fergal O'Brien	2
(England) Martin Gould	4

Last 16; Best of 7 frames
(England) Jimmy Robertson	4
(England) Martin Gould	2

===== Section 8 =====
Last 128; Best of 7 frames
(Belgium) Luca Brecel	4
(England) Hammad Miah	0
(England) Michael Holt	2
(Brazil) Igor Figueiredo	4
(England) Nigel Bond	w/d
(England) Alex Davies	w/o
(India) Aditya Mehta	3
(Finland) Robin Hull	4
(England) Michael Wasley	2
(England) Steven Hallworth	4
(England) Stuart Carrington	4
(England) Richard Beckham	0
(England) Joel Walker	4
(Wales) Kishan Hirani	1
(Scotland) Stephen Maguire	3
(Scotland) Ross Muir	4

Last 64; Best of 7 frames
(Belgium) Luca Brecel	4
(Brazil) Igor Figueiredo	2
(England) Alex Davies	4
(Finland) Robin Hull	2
(England) Steven Hallworth	2
(England) Stuart Carrington	4
(England) Joel Walker	2
(Scotland) Ross Muir	4

Last 32; Best of 7 frames
(Belgium) Luca Brecel	4
(England) Alex Davies	1
(England) Stuart Carrington	4
(Scotland) Ross Muir	3

Last 16; Best of 7 frames
(Belgium) Luca Brecel	4
(England) Stuart Carrington	2

==== Finals ====
Quarter-finals; Best of 7 frames		Semi-finals; Best of 7 frames		Final; Best of 7 frames
(England) Shaun Murphy	4
(England) Robert Milkins	2	(England) Shaun Murphy	2
(Australia) Neil Robertson	4	(Australia) Neil Robertson	4
(England) Judd Trump	3			(Australia) Neil Robertson	4
(Wales) Mark Williams	4			(Wales) Mark Williams	0
(England) Joe Perry	1	(Wales) Mark Williams	4
(England) Jimmy Robertson	4	(England) Jimmy Robertson	0
(Belgium) Luca Brecel	1

== Century breaks ==
- 142, 137, 136, 118, 109, 108 – Neil Robertson
- 142 – Kurt Maflin
- 142 – Mark Joyce
- 140, 132, 111, 107, 103, 101 – Shaun Murphy
- 139 – Charlie Walters
- 135 – Stuart Bingham
- 131 – Anthony McGill
- 130 – Robin Hull
- 130 – Michael Georgiou
- 128, 119, 106, 104 – Judd Trump
- 128, 105 – Robert Milkins
- 127, 104, 101 – Dylan Craig
- 124 – Jamie Cope
- 123 – Mark Davis
- 120, 103, 101 – Mark Williams
- 120 – Paul Davison
- 116, 105, 102 – Joe Perry
- 114 – Graeme Dott
- 112 – Stuart Carrington
- 112 – Luca Brecel
- 111, 108 – Adam Duffy
- 111, 106 – Martin Gould
- 110, 107 – Jimmy Robertson
- 110 – Rod Lawler
- 109 – Jamie Clarke
- 109 – Thomas Dowling
- 108 – Anthony Jeffers
- 106 – Ross Muir
- 105, 104 – Jamie Jones
- 105 – Dechawat Poomjaeng
- 104, 101 – Michael Wasley
- 104 – Jamie Burnett
- 103 – Michael White
- 103 – Chris Wakelin
- 102 – Tony Drago
- 100 – Ryan Day
- 100 – Steven Hallworth
- 100 – Ricky Walden
