= Robert Milkins =

English snooker player (born 1976)

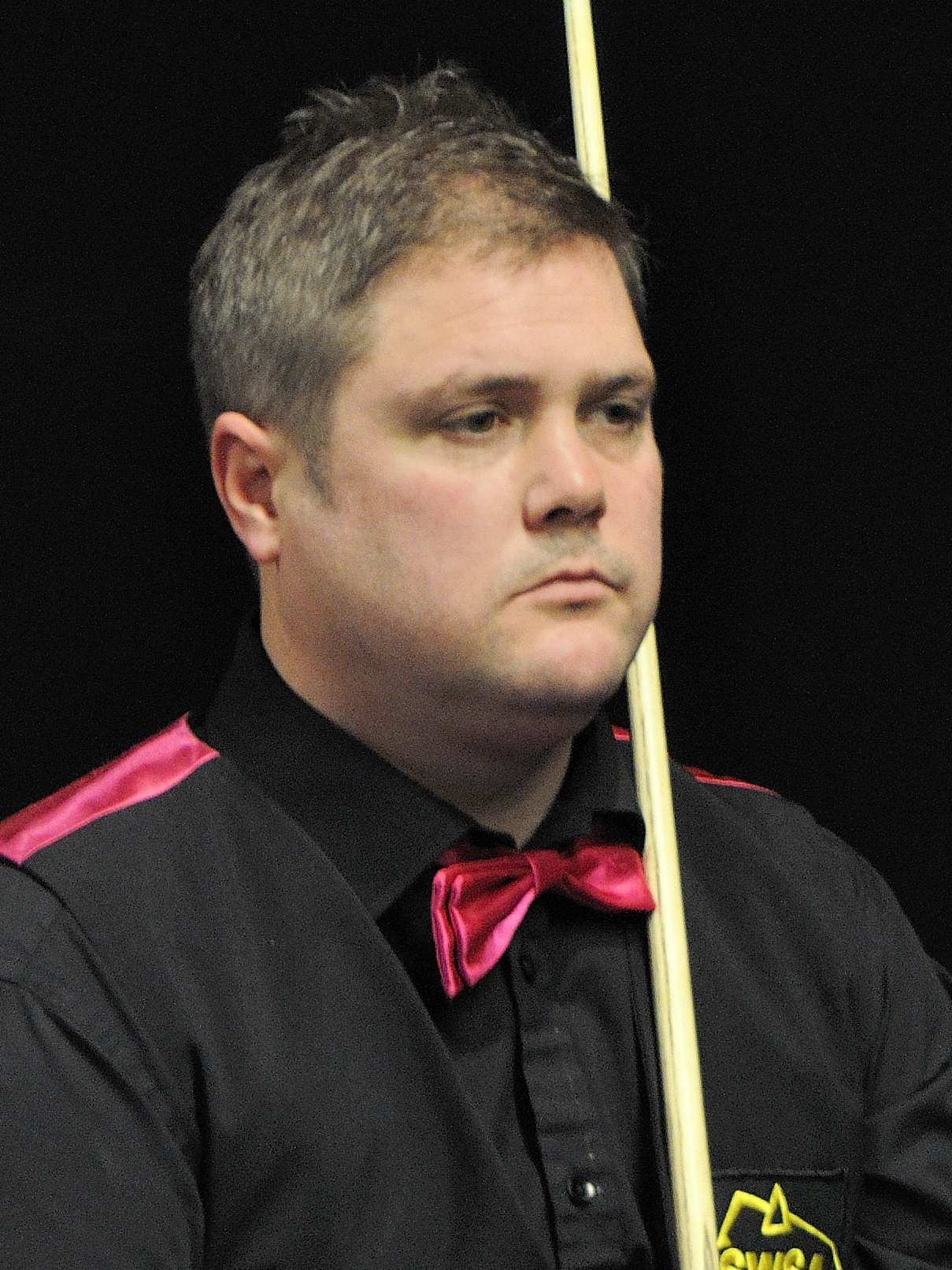
- Milkins at the 2013 German Masters

Personal information
- Nickname: The Milkman
- Born: 6 March 1976 (age 50) Bedminster Down, Bristol, England

Sport
- Country: England
- Sport: Snooker
- Professional: 1995–1997, 1998–2026
- Highest ranking: 12 (February 2014 and June 2023)
- Maximum breaks: 3
- Century breaks: 205

Tournament wins
- Ranking: 2

Robert Milkins (born 6 March 1976) is an English former professional snooker player known for quick play. Milkins has been a member of snooker's main tour since regaining a tour card in 1998.

Milkins reached a career high rank of 12 in 2014 and 2023, and has been in and around the world's top 32 for two decades. At age 46, after 27 years as a professional, he won his first ranking title at the 2022 Gibraltar Open, becoming the oldest first-time winner of a ranking event since Doug Mountjoy at the 1988 UK Championship. He won his second ranking title at the 2023 Welsh Open, where he also secured the BetVictor Series bonus of £150,000 for winning the most cumulative prize money across the series' eight events.

== Career ==
Milkins turned professional in 1995, but dropped off the Main Tour when it was reduced in size after the 1996/1997 season, only to return a year later via the UK Tour. After four seasons of solid progress, with the occasional last-16 runs, he reached the last-16 of the World Snooker Championship in 2002, and the first round in each of the next three years.

He made history in qualifying for the 2006 World Snooker Championship by making a 147 break in his match against Mark Selby. He became only the sixth player to achieve a maximum in the tournament, and the first to do so in qualifying (as a result, he earned £5,000; in the main tournament, it would have been worth £147,000). He ultimately lost to Selby 4–10, becoming only the second player to lose a World Championship match despite a 147, the other being Ronnie O'Sullivan against Marco Fu in 2003. Milkins also made a maximum break against Xiao Guodong in the fourth qualifying round of the 2012 tournament, and this time he won the match 10–4. He has also been on the wrong end of a 147 in the tournament – Mark Williams completed a 10–1 victory in the first round of the 2005 tournament with a final-frame maximum.

In 2005, he reached the Irish Masters semi-final, but lost 8–9 against Matthew Stevens.

He lost in the final qualifying round of the World Championships for the second year in a row in 2007 – 10–4 against Mark Allen. In 2008, he did not get this far, losing 10–4 to Barry Pinches.

At the 2006 Grand Prix, he and Ronnie O'Sullivan were the only players to win all 5 group matches; however, Milkins lost 5–0 to eventual finalist Jamie Cope in the last 16. The 2007–08 season was a poor one for Milkins, as he slipped down the rankings to number 51.

Milkins had a strong run at the 2008 Bahrain Championship. After being elevated into the top 48 seeds due to a clash with previously arranged Premier League Snooker matches, he won two qualifiers before reaching the quarter-finals at the venue, defeating Michael Holt 5–4 in the last, 16 having trailed 0–3.

In 2009, Milkins joined player management company, On Q Promotions Ltd. of Gloucester.

Milkins' walk on music for the main stages of events is I Am a Cider Drinker by The Wurzels, and after his defeat in the 2014 Ruhr Open Final, he performed a verse of the song in his post-match interview to the crowd.

Milkins reached the second ranking-event semi-final of his career in the 2012 World Open. He qualified for the tournament with 5–1 and 5–0 wins over Sam Craigie and Ryan Day respectively. He was required to play in a wildcard round once at the event in Haikou, China, where he beat amateur Thanawat Thirapongpaiboon 5–3 to set up a first round encounter against Stephen Maguire which Milkins won by another 5–3 scoreline. He defeated Jin Long 5–2, before dispatching reigning world champion John Higgins 5–3 in the quarter-finals. However, Milkins lost his last 4 encounter with Stephen Lee 2–6 and admitted after the match his performance levels had dropped from his previous displays in the tournament. Milkins also reached the second round of the Shanghai Masters and the first round of the UK Championship during the 2011–12 season and made a 147 break in the qualifying stage of the World Championship. He finished 2011/12 ranked world number 36.

Milkins began the 2012–13 season by qualifying for the Wuxi Classic by beating Liu Chuang and Ryan Day. Once at the venue in China he came through the wildcard round and then defeated Andrew Higginson 5–3, world number two Judd Trump 5–3 (after being 1–3 down) to reach the quarter-finals where he was on the wrong side of a 5–3 scoreline against Ricky Walden. After this Milkins lost in the qualifying draw of the Australian Goldfields Open and in the first round of four consecutive ranking events. He bucked the trend at the Welsh Open by scoring 4–1 and 4–2 wins over Mark Williams and Sam Baird, but lost 1–5 to Ding Junhui in the quarter-finals. Milkins followed this up by reaching the second round of both the World Open and the China Open, losing to Mark Allen and Stuart Bingham respectively.

Milkins finished 41st on the Players Tour Championship Order of Merit, outside of the top 26 who secured berths into the Finals. However, he took part in all three of the new Asian PTC's and performed well enough to finish 5th on the Order of Merit, which was high enough to qualify for the Finals. There, Milkins lost 2–4 to Anthony McGill in the first round. Milkins qualified for the World Championship for the first time in eight years by defeating six-time runner-up Jimmy White 10–5 in the final qualifying round. Milkins was drawn against world number two and 2010 champion Neil Robertson in the first round, and defeated him 10–8 having trailed 2–5 and described the win as the best of his career afterwards. He found himself 3–9 down to Ricky Walden in the second round, but stormed back into the match to only trail 10–11 before falling short of completing a remarkable comeback as Walden secured the two frames he required to seal a 13–11 win. His successful season saw him rise 18 places in the rankings to world number 18, the highest he has ended a season to date.

=== 2013/2014 season ===
He continued his form into the 2013 Wuxi Classic, the first ranking event of the 2013–14 season. Milkins beat John Astley 5–0, Jimmy White 5–3, Scott Donaldson 5–1 and Anthony Hamilton 5–3. In Milkins' third ranking event semi-final of his career he faced new world number one Neil Robertson and lost all four frames in the first mini session, going on to be beaten 2–6. His consistent play carried into the next ranking event, the Australian Goldfields Open by seeing off Ben Woollaston 5–3, Rory McLeod 5–2 and Tom Ford 5–3 to reach another semi-final. Milkins was 1–4 down against Marco Fu, but pulled it back to 4–4 before losing the next two frames to fall short of making his first ranking final. Milkins advanced to the fourth round of the 2013 UK Championship, but was thrashed 6–0 by Ronnie O'Sullivan. Nevertheless, he was ranked inside the top 16 after the event to qualify for the Masters for the first time in his career. He faced O'Sullivan in a one sided match once again with Milkins losing 6–1.

Milkins' season finished in disappointment as he lost in qualifying for the German Masters and China Open, the first round of the Welsh Open and second round of the World Open. His match against Michael Wasley in the final round of World Championship qualifying went to a re-spotted black in the deciding frame which Wasley potted to beat Milkins 10–9. He dropped out of the top 16 by the end of the season to finish it as the world number 20.

=== 2014/2015 season ===
Milkins began the season well once again by beating Liang Wenbo 5–3 and John Higgins 5–2 to play Neil Robertson in the quarter-finals of the Australian Goldfields Open and was defeated 5–2. He eliminated Barry Pinches 6–2, Shaun Murphy 6–1 and Xiao Guodong 6–4 to play in the quarter-finals of the International Championship. A high quality match with Marco Fu followed which Milkins edged 6–5. He said ahead of his match with Ricky Walden that he had to forget it was a semi-final and focus on his game in an attempt to reach his first ranking event final. However, it would be a fifth exit at the last four stage as Milkins was thrashed 9–2. In November, he reached the final of the minor-ranking Ruhr Open, but lost 4–0 against Murphy.

Milkins did not drop a frame in seeing off Michael Leslie and Marcus Campbell at the UK Championship, but was then whitewashed 6–0 by Graeme Dott in the last 32. In the first round of the Masters he was beaten 6–4 by Robertson having been 4–3 ahead. Milkins won through to the quarter-finals of the Indian Open and lost 4–1 to Mark Williams. After he overcame Michael White 5–1 at the China Open, Milkins knew that he had to reach the final to enter the top 16 in the world rankings and avoid playing three qualifying matches for the World Championship. In his fourth ranking event quarter-final of the season, Milkins led Mark Selby on four occasions but each time he levelled and Selby won the deciding frame 71–0. Milkins did win three matches to qualify for the World Championship and lost 10–5 to John Higgins in the opening round. Milkins finished the season inside the top 16 for the first time in his career as he was 16th.

=== 2015/2016 season ===
Milkins lost 5–3 in the second round of the Australian Goldfields Open to Joe Perry and 5–0 in the first round of the Shanghai Masters to Judd Trump. He reached the semi-finals of the Asian Tour's Haining Open, but was defeated 4–1 by Ricky Walden. Milkins was knocked out in the second round of the UK Championship 6–2 by David Grace. His second last 16 appearance in a ranking event this season came at the PTC Finals courtesy of eliminating Tian Pengfei 4–1. He had chances in the deciding frame against Barry Hawkins to make the quarter-finals, but failed to take them to lose 4–3. Milkins ensured his place in the World Championship draw by beating Kurt Maflin 10–7. He fell 7–2 behind Mark Selby after the first session, before winning four frames in a row upon the resumption of play to trail by one. However, Selby then took the three frames he needed to overcome Milkins 10–6.

=== 2016/2017 season ===
Milkins lost in the third round of the Indian Open 4–2 to amateur David Lilley. He did not win another match at the venue stage of a ranking event until November when he beat Hamza Akbar 6–1 at the UK Championship. Milkins followed that up with a 6–5 victory over Hammad Miah, before playing in his opinion the worst match of his professional career as he was defeated 6–1 by Mark Selby. His first ranking event quarter-final in two years came at the Scottish Open by beating Anthony Hamiltom 4–3, but he lost 5–3 to Judd Trump. At the next Home Nations event, the Welsh Open he went one better by overcoming Kurt Maflin 5–2 to play in his sixth ranking event semi-final. Stuart Bingham whitewashed him 6–0.

=== 2022/2023 season ===
At the 2023 World Championship, Milkins beat Joe Perry 10‍–‍9 in the first round, having trailed 2‍–‍7. Milkins then lost his next match to Si Jiahui 7‍–‍13 in the last 16.

=== 2023/2024 season ===
At the 2023 UK Championships, Milkins reached the last 16 where he was defeated 5‍–‍6 by Ronnie O'Sullivan. At the 2024 Masters, he was defeated 1‍–‍6 by Mark Selby in the first round. Milkins reached the second round of the 2024 World Championship where he lost heavily to David Gilbert 4‍–‍13.

== Personal life ==
Milkins has spoken openly about problems with debt, lack of motivation and harmful use of alcohol. He was coached by 1979 World Champion Terry Griffiths up until the end of the 2014/2015 season. He has three children.

== Performance and rankings timeline ==
Tournament	1995/ 96	1996/ 97	1997/ 98	1998/ 99	1999/ 00	2000/ 01	2001/ 02	2002/ 03	2003/ 04	2004/ 05	2005/ 06	2006/ 07	2007/ 08	2008/ 09	2009/ 10	2010/ 11	2011/ 12	2012/ 13	2013/ 14	2014/ 15	2015/ 16	2016/ 17	2017/ 18	2018/ 19	2019/ 20		2020/ 21	2021/ 22	2022/ 23	2023/ 24	2024/ 25	2025/ 26
Ranking (Note: It shows the ranking at the beginning of the season)	(Note: New players on the Main Tour don't have a ranking)	231	91	99	100	75	54	33	21	28	26	32	47	51	55	36	33	36	18	20	16	21	34	35	36		49	37	27	12	17	49
Ranking tournaments
Championship League	Tournament Not Held												Non-Ranking Event														2R	RR	2R	3R	RR	RR
Saudi Arabia Masters	Tournament Not Held																														3R	3R
Wuhan Open	Tournament Not Held																													2R	1R	LQ
English Open	Tournament Not Held																					1R	3R	4R	1R		1R	LQ	2R	2R	1R	LQ
British Open	LQ	1R	A	LQ	LQ	3R	LQ	1R	1R	2R	Tournament Not Held																	1R	LQ	1R	LQ	1R
Xi'an Grand Prix	Tournament Not Held																														LQ	3R
Northern Ireland Open	Tournament Not Held																					1R	QF	1R	1R		2R	1R	3R	LQ	2R	1R
International Championship	Tournament Not Held																	1R	1R	SF	LQ	LQ	3R	2R	2R		Not Held			LQ	LQ	LQ
UK Championship	LQ	2R	A	LQ	1R	LQ	1R	QF	1R	2R	1R	1R	LQ	LQ	LQ	LQ	1R	1R	4R	3R	2R	3R	2R	2R	2R		3R	2R	LQ	2R	1R	LQ
Shoot Out	Tournament Not Held															Non-ranking Event						2R	2R	1R	1R		QF	1R	2R	2R	4R	1R
Scottish Open (Note: The event was called the International Open (1995/1996–1996/1997) and the Players Championship (2003/2004))	LQ	LQ	A	LQ	LQ	LQ	1R	2R	1R	Tournament Not Held								MR	Not Held			QF	2R	2R	2R		3R	LQ	2R	LQ	1R	1R
German Masters (Note: The event was called the German Open (1995/1996–1997/1998))	LQ	LQ	A	NR	Tournament Not Held											1R	LQ	1R	LQ	LQ	LQ	LQ	LQ	2R	1R		LQ	LQ	SF	2R	2R	LQ
World Grand Prix	Tournament Not Held																			NR	DNQ	DNQ	1R	DNQ	DNQ		2R	DNQ	1R	DNQ	DNQ	DNQ
Players Championship (Note: The event was called the Players Tour Championship Grand Final (2010/2011–2015/2016))	Tournament Not Held															DNQ	DNQ	1R	DNQ	1R	2R	DNQ	DNQ	DNQ	DNQ		DNQ	DNQ	QF	DNQ	DNQ	DNQ
Welsh Open	LQ	LQ	A	1R	LQ	LQ	LQ	LQ	QF	1R	3R	1R	LQ	LQ	LQ	LQ	LQ	QF	1R	1R	2R	SF	1R	1R	3R		2R	LQ	W	3R	2R	LQ
World Open (Note: The event was called the Grand Prix (1995/1996–2000/2001 and 2004/2005–2009/2010) and the LG Cup (2001/2002–2003/2004))	LQ	LQ	A	1R	LQ	3R	LQ	LQ	1R	2R	1R	2R	LQ	LQ	QF	LQ	SF	2R	2R	Not Held		LQ	2R	3R	LQ		Not Held			2R	1R	LQ
Tour Championship	Tournament Not Held																							DNQ	DNQ		DNQ	DNQ	QF	DNQ	DNQ	DNQ
World Championship	LQ	LQ	LQ	LQ	LQ	LQ	2R	1R	1R	1R	LQ	LQ	LQ	LQ	LQ	LQ	LQ	2R	LQ	1R	1R	LQ	2R	LQ	LQ		LQ	LQ	2R	2R	LQ	LQ
Non-ranking tournaments
Shanghai Masters	Tournament Not Held													Ranking Event										A	A		Not Held			QF	A	A
Champion of Champions	Tournament Not Held																		A	A	A	A	A	A	A		A	A	1R	QF	A	A
The Masters	LQ	LQ	LQ	LQ	LQ	LQ	LQ	LQ	LQ	A	A	A	A	LQ	LQ	A	A	A	1R	1R	A	A	A	A	A		A	A	A	1R	A	A
Championship League	Tournament Not Held												A	A	A	A	A	RR	RR	RR	RR	RR	RR	RR	RR	RR	A	A	WD	RR	RR	A
World Seniors Championship	Tournament Not Held															A	A	A	A	A	QF	A	A	A	A		A	A	A	A	A	SF
Former ranking tournaments
Asian Classic (Note: The event was called the Thailand Classic (1995/1996))	LQ	LQ	Tournament Not Held																													
Malta Grand Prix	Non-Ranking Event				2R	NR	Tournament Not Held																									
Thailand Masters (Note: The event was called the Thailand Open (1995/1996–1996/1997))	LQ	LQ	A	LQ	LQ	LQ	LQ	NR	Not Held			NR	Tournament Not Held																			
Irish Masters	Non-Ranking Event							1R	LQ	SF	NH	NR	Tournament Not Held																			
Northern Ireland Trophy	Tournament Not Held										NR	2R	LQ	LQ	Tournament Not Held																	
Bahrain Championship	Tournament Not Held													QF	Tournament Not Held																	
Wuxi Classic (Note: The event was called the Jiangsu Classic (2008/2009–2009/2010))	Tournament Not Held													Non-Ranking Event				QF	SF	2R	Tournament Not Held											
Australian Goldfields Open (Note: The event was called the Australian Masters (1995/1996) and the Australian Open (1995/1996))	NR	Tournament Not Held															LQ	LQ	SF	QF	2R	Tournament Not Held										
Shanghai Masters	Tournament Not Held												LQ	LQ	LQ	WR	2R	1R	2R	1R	1R	1R	2R	Non-Ranking			Not Held			Non-Ranking		
Paul Hunter Classic (Note: The event was called the Grand Prix Fürth (2004/2005) and the Fürth German Open (2005/2006–2006/2007))	Tournament Not Held									Pro-am Event						Minor-Ranking Event						WD	1R	2R	NR		Tournament Not Held					
Indian Open	Tournament Not Held																		LQ	QF	NH	3R	1R	LQ	Tournament Not Held							
China Open (Note: The event was called the China International (1997/1998–1998/1999))	Not Held		NR	LQ	LQ	LQ	LQ	Not Held		1R	LQ	LQ	LQ	1R	1R	2R	LQ	2R	LQ	QF	2R	1R	LQ	1R	Tournament Not Held							
Riga Masters (Note: The event was called the Riga Open (2014/2015–2015/2016))	Tournament Not Held																			Minor-Rank		LQ	2R	1R	WD		Tournament Not Held					
China Championship	Tournament Not Held																					NR	1R	1R	LQ		Tournament Not Held					
WST Pro Series	Tournament Not Held																										2R	Tournament Not Held				
Turkish Masters	Tournament Not Held																											1R	Tournament Not Held			
Gibraltar Open	Tournament Not Held																				MR	2R	1R	QF	1R		3R	W	Tournament Not Held			
WST Classic	Tournament Not Held																												2R	Not Held		
European Masters (Note: The event was called the European Open (1995/1996–1996/1997 and 2001/2002–2003/2004), the Irish Open (1998/1999) and the Malta Cup (2004/2005–2007/2008))	LQ	1R	NH	LQ	Not Held		1R	1R	LQ	1R	1R	1R	NR	Tournament Not Held								LQ	LQ	LQ	1R		2R	LQ	3R	LQ	Not Held	
Former non-ranking tournaments
World Grand Prix	Tournament Not Held																			2R	Ranking Event											
Shoot-Out	Tournament Not Held															F	3R	2R	1R	1R	QF	Ranking Event										
Six-red World Championship (Note: The event was called the Six-red Snooker International (2008/2009) and the Six-red World Grand Prix (2009/2010))	Tournament Not Held													A	A	A	NH	A	3R	2R	3R	2R	A	A	A		Not Held		RR	Not Held		

Performance Table Legend
LQ	lost in the qualifying draw	#R	lost in the early rounds of the tournament (WR = Wildcard round, RR = Round robin)	QF	lost in the quarter-finals
SF	lost in the semi-finals	F	lost in the final	W	won the tournament
DNQ	did not qualify for the tournament	A	did not participate in the tournament	WD	withdrew from the tournament

NH / Not Held	means an event was not held.
NR / Non-Ranking Event	means an event is/was no longer a ranking event.
R / Ranking Event	means an event is/was a ranking event.
MR / Minor-Ranking Event	means an event is/was a minor-ranking event.
PA / Pro-am Event	means an event is/was a pro-am event.

== Career finals ==
=== Ranking finals: 2 (2 titles) ===
Outcome	No.	Year	Championship	Opponent in the final	Score
Winner	1.	2022	Gibraltar Open	(England) Kyren Wilson	4–2
Winner	2.	2023	Welsh Open	(England) Shaun Murphy	9–7

=== Minor-ranking finals: 1 ===
Outcome	No.	Year	Championship	Opponent in the final	Score
Runner-up	1.	2014	Ruhr Open	(England) Shaun Murphy	0–4

=== Non-ranking finals: 3 (1 title) ===
Outcome	No.	Year	Championship	Opponent in the final	Score
Runner-up	1.	1998	UK Tour – Event 3	(England) Simon Bedford	4–6
Winner	1.	2009	Pro Challenge Series – Event 3	(England) Joe Jogia	5–3
Runner-up	2.	2011	Snooker Shoot Out	(England) Nigel Bond	0–1

=== Pro-am finals: 1 (1 title) ===
Outcome	No.	Year	Championship	Opponent in the final	Score
Winner	1.	2017	Pink Ribbon	(England) Rob James	4–2
