= European Tour 2015/2016 – Event 5 =

European Tour 2015/2016 Event 5
Tournament information
- Dates: 9–13 December 2015
- Venue: Tercentenary Sports Hall
- City: Gibraltar
- Organisation: World Snooker
- Format: Minor-ranking event
- Total prize fund: €125,000
- Winner's share: €25,000
- Highest break: Marco Fu (HKG) (147)

Final
- Champion: Marco Fu (HKG)
- Runner-up: Michael White (WAL)
- Score: 4–1

The European Tour 2015/2016 – Event 5 (also known as the 2015 Gibraltar Open) was a professional minor-ranking snooker tournament held between 9–13 December 2015 in Gibraltar.

Marco Fu made the 116th official maximum break in the fifth frame of his last 64 match against Sam Baird. This was Fu's fourth official 147 break and also the second maximum break in the 2015/2016 season.

== Prize fund ==
The breakdown of prize money of the event is shown below:

	Prize fund
Winner	€25,000
Runner-up	€12,000
Semi-finalist	€6,000
Quarter-finalist	€4,000
Last 16	€2,300
Last 32	€1,200
Last 64	€700
Total	€125,000

== Main draw ==
=== Preliminary rounds ===
==== Round 1 ====
Best of 7 frames

(England) Sam Craigie	4–1	(England) Danny Connolly
(England) Adam Edge	w/d–w/o	(Germany) Lukas Kleckers
(England) Sam Thistlewhite	4–0	(England) Joshua Cooper
(Netherlands) Kevin Chan	w/o–w/d	(England) Jamie O'Neill
(China) Zhao Xintong	4–1	(England) Joe Steele
(England) Jake Nicholson	4–2	(Germany) Robin Otto
(England) Michael Williams	4–0	(Poland) Mateusz Baranowski
(England) Reanne Evans	2–4	(England) Oliver Brown
(England) Ashley Hugill	4–1	(England) Joshua Baddeley
(Morocco) Mourad Naitali	4–0	(Portugal) Francisco Domingues
(Scotland) Mark Owens	3–4	(England) Nico Elton
(Germany) Simon Lichtenberg	3–4	(Poland) Kacper Filipiak
(England) Joe O'Connor	2–4	(England) Brandon Sargeant
(Scotland) Dylan Craig	4–1	(Northern Ireland) Conor McCormack
(England) Simon Dent	0–4	(England) Hammad Miah

(Russia) Maxim Maximov	1–4	(England) Stephen Webber
(England) Richard Beckham	4–3	(Germany) Felix Frede
(Netherlands) Manon Melief	0–4	(Wales) Jamie Clarke
(Bulgaria) Ivelin Bozhanov	3–4	(England) Edward Topharn
(Belgium) Tomasz Skalski	4–3	(Wales) Callum Lloyd
(England) Robbie Purdham	0–4	(Wales) Kishan Hirani
(Poland) Marcin Nitschke	1–4	(England) Phil O'Kane
(England) Christopher Keogan	2–4	(England) George Pragnall
(England) Richard Ammons	2–4	(England) James Dabell
(England) Adam Duffy	4–2	(Scotland) Ross Higgins
(England) Manasawin Phetmalaikul	2–4	(Wales) Alex Taubman
(England) Elliot Slessor	4–2	(Wales) Ben Jones
(England) Adam King	4–3	(England) Lee Prickman
(Belgium) Jurian Heusdens	0–4	(England) Ashley Carty
(England) Adam Longley	2–4	(Wales) Thomas Rees

==== Round 2 ====
Best of 7 frames

(England) Sam Craigie	4–0	(Germany) Lukas Kleckers
(England) Saqib Nasir	0–4	(England) Sam Thistlewhite
(Netherlands) Kevin Chan	0–4	(China) Zhao Xintong
(England) Jake Nicholson	4–3	(England) Michael Williams
(England) Sean Galligan	0–4	(England) Oliver Brown
(Germany) Dieter Meier	0–4	(England) Ashley Hugill
(Morocco) Mourad Naitali	0–4	(England) Nico Elton
(Malta) Brian Cini	1–4	(Poland) Kacper Filipiak
(Gibraltar) Francis Becerra	0–4	(England) Brandon Sargeant
(Scotland) Michael Collumb	2–4	(Scotland) Dylan Craig
(England) Hammad Miah	4–0	(England) Stephen Webber

(England) Mohammed Rangzib	1–4	(England) Richard Beckham
(England) Ryan Causton	1–4	(Wales) Jamie Clarke
(England) Edward Topharn	1–4	(Belgium) Tomasz Skalski
(Wales) James Facey	1–4	(Wales) Kishan Hirani
(Germany) Daniel Schneider	4–2	(England) Phil O'Kane
(England) George Pragnall	4–1	(England) James Dabell
(England) Louis Heathcote	4–3	(England) Adam Duffy
(Wales) Alex Taubman	0–4	(England) Elliot Slessor
(England) Adam King	0–4	(England) Ashley Carty
(Finland) Tom Stormbom	0–4	(Wales) Thomas Rees

=== Main rounds ===
==== Top half ====
===== Section 1 =====
Last 128; Best of 7 frames
(England) Rory McLeod	3
(England) Zak Surety	4
(India) Aditya Mehta	4
(England) Sam Craigie	0
(England) Joel Walker	w/o
(Australia) Neil Robertson	w/d
(China) Liang Wenbo	4
(Wales) Matthew Stevens	2
(England) Joe Perry	2
(England) Sam Thistlewhite	4
(England) Jamie Cope	0
(China) Zhao Xintong	4
(Scotland) Eden Sharav	0
(China) Yu Delu	4
(England) Mark Selby	4
(England) Sydney Wilson	1

Last 64; Best of 7 frames
(England) Zak Surety	4
(India) Aditya Mehta	1
(England) Joel Walker	1
(China) Liang Wenbo	4
(England) Sam Thistlewhite	1
(China) Zhao Xintong	4
(China) Yu Delu	2
(England) Mark Selby	4

Last 32; Best of 7 frames
(England) Zak Surety	0
(China) Liang Wenbo	4
(China) Zhao Xintong	1
(England) Mark Selby	4

Last 16; Best of 7 frames
(China) Liang Wenbo	4
(England) Mark Selby	3

===== Section 2 =====
Last 128; Best of 7 frames
(Scotland) Alan McManus	4
(England) Jake Nicholson	1
(Wales) Jamie Jones	4
(Wales) Gareth Allen	0
(China) Zhou Yuelong	4
(Isle of Man) Darryl Hill	1
(England) Peter Ebdon	4
(England) Michael Wasley	3
(England) Jimmy Robertson	3
(England) David Grace	4
(Scotland) Stephen Maguire	4
(England) Sanderson Lam	1
(Republic of Ireland) Fergal O'Brien	4
(Scotland) Rhys Clark	0
(England) Mike Dunn	4
(England) Oliver Brown	3

Last 64; Best of 7 frames
(Scotland) Alan McManus	0
(Wales) Jamie Jones	4
(China) Zhou Yuelong	2
(England) Peter Ebdon	4
(England) David Grace	4
(Scotland) Stephen Maguire	3
(Republic of Ireland) Fergal O'Brien	4
(England) Mike Dunn	3

Last 32; Best of 7 frames
(Wales) Jamie Jones	1
(England) Peter Ebdon	4
(England) David Grace	4
(Republic of Ireland) Fergal O'Brien	3

Last 16; Best of 7 frames
(England) Peter Ebdon	2
(England) David Grace	4

===== Section 3 =====
Last 128; Best of 7 frames
(China) Tian Pengfei	4
(Australia) Vinnie Calabrese	1
(England) Mitchell Mann	1
(England) Ashley Hugill	4
(Scotland) Michael Leslie	w/o
(Scotland) Fraser Patrick	w/d
(Wales) Dominic Dale	4
(Thailand) Noppon Saengkham	0
(England) Kyren Wilson	4
(England) Nico Elton	2
(Norway) Kurt Maflin	4
(Poland) Kacper Filipiak	0
(China) Zhang Anda	4
(China) Cao Yupeng	3
(Scotland) Graeme Dott	4
(Scotland) Ross Muir	0

Last 64; Best of 7 frames
(China) Tian Pengfei	4
(England) Ashley Hugill	3
(Scotland) Michael Leslie	0
(Wales) Dominic Dale	4
(England) Kyren Wilson	4
(Norway) Kurt Maflin	1
(China) Zhang Anda	4
(Scotland) Graeme Dott	1

Last 32; Best of 7 frames
(China) Tian Pengfei	3
(Wales) Dominic Dale	4
(England) Kyren Wilson	4
(China) Zhang Anda	2

Last 16; Best of 7 frames
(Wales) Dominic Dale	4
(England) Kyren Wilson	3

===== Section 4 =====
Last 128; Best of 7 frames
(England) David Gilbert	2
(England) Brandon Sargeant	4
(England) Mark Joyce	3
(Scotland) Dylan Craig	4
(Hong Kong) Marco Fu	w/o
(Malta) Tony Drago	w/d
(England) Sam Baird	4
(England) Paul Davison	1
(Belgium) Luca Brecel	4
(England) Barry Pinches	0
(England) Gary Wilson	4
(Pakistan) Hamza Akbar	1
(Wales) Lee Walker	4
(England) Hammad Miah	0
(Wales) Mark Williams	3
(England) Richard Beckham	4

Last 64; Best of 7 frames
(England) Brandon Sargeant	1
(Scotland) Dylan Craig	4
(Hong Kong) Marco Fu	4
(England) Sam Baird	2
(Belgium) Luca Brecel	4
(England) Gary Wilson	1
(Wales) Lee Walker	4
(England) Richard Beckham	1

Last 32; Best of 7 frames
(Scotland) Dylan Craig	2
(Hong Kong) Marco Fu	4
(Belgium) Luca Brecel	4
(Wales) Lee Walker	3

Last 16; Best of 7 frames
(Hong Kong) Marco Fu	4
(Belgium) Luca Brecel	2

==== Bottom half ====
===== Section 5 =====
Last 128; Best of 7 frames
(Wales) Ryan Day	4
(Wales) Jamie Clarke	1
(Northern Ireland) Gerard Greene	w/d
(Iran) Hossein Vafaei	w/o
(England) Chris Wakelin	4
(England) Michael Georgiou	1
(England) Oliver Lines	4
(China) Xiao Guodong	2
(England) Matthew Selt	4
(Republic of Ireland) David Morris	3
(England) Alfie Burden	4
(Belgium) Tomasz Skalski	0
(England) Robbie Williams	4
(England) James Cahill	1
(England) Stuart Carrington	3
(England) Ian Glover	4

Last 64; Best of 7 frames
(Wales) Ryan Day	4
(Iran) Hossein Vafaei	3
(England) Chris Wakelin	0
(England) Oliver Lines	4
(England) Matthew Selt	1
(England) Alfie Burden	4
(England) Robbie Williams	4
(England) Ian Glover	2

Last 32; Best of 7 frames
(Wales) Ryan Day	3
(England) Oliver Lines	4
(England) Alfie Burden	4
(England) Robbie Williams	1

Last 16; Best of 7 frames
(England) Oliver Lines	2
(England) Alfie Burden	4

===== Section 6 =====
Last 128; Best of 7 frames
(England) Michael Holt	4
(Wales) Duane Jones	1
(Scotland) Scott Donaldson	1
(England) Anthony Hamilton	4
(Scotland) Anthony McGill	4
(Wales) Kishan Hirani	3
(England) Andrew Higginson	4
(Germany) Daniel Schneider	0
(Wales) Michael White	4
(England) Peter Lines	1
(Republic of Ireland) Ken Doherty	2
(England) Liam Highfield	4
(England) Rod Lawler	4
(China) Lu Ning	1
(England) Judd Trump	4
(China) Zhang Yong	0

Last 64; Best of 7 frames
(England) Michael Holt	2
(England) Anthony Hamilton	4
(Scotland) Anthony McGill	3
(England) Andrew Higginson	4
(Wales) Michael White	4
(England) Liam Highfield	1
(England) Rod Lawler	4
(England) Judd Trump	3

Last 32; Best of 7 frames
(England) Anthony Hamilton	1
(England) Andrew Higginson	4
(Wales) Michael White	4
(England) Rod Lawler	1

Last 16; Best of 7 frames
(England) Andrew Higginson	3
(Wales) Michael White	4

===== Section 7 =====
Last 128; Best of 7 frames
(England) Tom Ford	4
(Thailand) James Wattana	0
(England) Robert Milkins	2
(England) George Pragnall	4
(England) Ricky Walden	4
(England) Louis Heathcote	0
(England) Ian Burns	4
(England) Steven Hallworth	0
(England) Mark Davis	4
(England) Elliot Slessor	1
(China) Li Hang	4
(England) Allan Taylor	3
(Scotland) John Higgins	4
(Thailand) Dechawat Poomjaeng	0
(England) Mark King	4
(England) Ashley Carty	1

Last 64; Best of 7 frames
(England) Tom Ford	4
(England) George Pragnall	2
(England) Ricky Walden	4
(England) Ian Burns	0
(England) Mark Davis	4
(China) Li Hang	0
(Scotland) John Higgins	3
(England) Mark King	4

Last 32; Best of 7 frames
(England) Tom Ford	2
(England) Ricky Walden	4
(England) Mark Davis	2
(England) Mark King	4

Last 16; Best of 7 frames
(England) Ricky Walden	2
(England) Mark King	4

===== Section 8 =====
Last 128; Best of 7 frames
(England) Ben Woollaston	4
(Northern Ireland) Joe Swail	1
(England) Jack Lisowski	3
(England) Nigel Bond	4
(England) Martin O'Donnell	1
(England) Chris Melling	4
(Wales) Daniel Wells	4
(Wales) Thomas Rees	1
(Malaysia) Thor Chuan Leong	4
(Thailand) Thepchaiya Un-Nooh	3
(England) Jason Weston	4
(England) Jimmy White	2
(England) Stuart Bingham	4
(England) Craig Steadman	1
(England) Shaun Murphy	w/d
(China) Ding Junhui	w/o

Last 64; Best of 7 frames
(England) Ben Woollaston	2
(England) Nigel Bond	4
(England) Chris Melling	1
(Wales) Daniel Wells	4
(Malaysia) Thor Chuan Leong	4
(England) Jason Weston	1
(England) Stuart Bingham	4
(China) Ding Junhui	2

Last 32; Best of 7 frames
(England) Nigel Bond	4
(Wales) Daniel Wells	2
(Malaysia) Thor Chuan Leong	0
(England) Stuart Bingham	4

Last 16; Best of 7 frames
(England) Nigel Bond	0
(England) Stuart Bingham	4

==== Finals ====
Quarter-finals; Best of 7 frames
1	(China) Liang Wenbo	4
8	(England) David Grace	1
4	(Wales) Dominic Dale	1
5	(Hong Kong) Marco Fu	4
2	(England) Alfie Burden	2
7	(Wales) Michael White	4
3	(England) Mark King	1
6	(England) Stuart Bingham	4

Semi-finals; Best of 7 frames
(China) Liang Wenbo	0
(Hong Kong) Marco Fu	4
(Wales) Michael White	4
(England) Stuart Bingham	0

Final; Best of 7 frames
(Hong Kong) Marco Fu	4
(Wales) Michael White	1

== Century breaks ==
- 147, 140, 133 – Marco Fu
- 144 – Liang Wenbo
- 142, 104 – Zhao Xintong
- 135 – Liam Highfield
- 133, 127 – Sam Baird
- 132, 114, 110 – Michael White
- 130 – David Grace
- 129, 127 – Dominic Dale
- 129, 105 – Mark Selby
- 125 – Michael Holt
- 124 – Andrew Higginson
- 120, 103 – Alfie Burden
- 116, 101 – Mike Dunn
- 111, 105 – Stuart Bingham
- 110 – Graeme Dott
- 108 – Richard Beckham
- 107 – Nigel Bond
- 107 – Adam Duffy
- 106, 103, 101 – Luca Brecel
- 106 – Xiao Guodong
- 104 – Tom Ford
- 104 – George Pragnall
- 103 – Mark Davis
- 102 – Chris Melling
- 102 – Ricky Walden
- 102 – Kyren Wilson
- 102 – Daniel Wells
- 101 – Michael Georgiou
- 101 – Tian Pengfei
- 101 – Hossein Vafaei
- 100 – Mark King
