= European Tour 2015/2016 – Event 3 =

European Tour 2015/2016 Event 3
Tournament information
- Dates: 7–11 October 2015
- Venue: RWE-Sporthalle
- City: Mülheim
- Country: Germany
- Organisation: World Snooker
- Format: Minor-ranking event
- Total prize fund: €125,000
- Winner's share: €25,000
- Highest break: Stuart Carrington (ENG) (141)

Final
- Champion: Rory McLeod (ENG)
- Runner-up: Tian Pengfei (CHN)
- Score: 4–2

The European Tour 2015/2016 – Event 3 (also known as the 2015 Ruhr Open) was a professional minor-ranking snooker tournament that took place between 7–11 October 2015 in Mülheim, Germany.

Shaun Murphy was the defending champion, but he lost 1–4 to Tian Pengfei in the last 16.

Barry Pinches and Alan McManus played what was, at the time, snooker's longest ever official frame. In the sixth frame of their first round meeting they battled for 100 minutes and 24 seconds.

== Prize fund ==
The breakdown of prize money of the event is shown below:

	Prize fund
Winner	€25,000
Runner-up	€12,000
Semi-finalist	€6,000
Quarter-finalist	€4,000
Last 16	€2,300
Last 32	€1,200
Last 64	€700
Total	€125,000

== Main draw ==
=== Preliminary rounds ===
==== Round 1 ====
Best of 7 frames

(Germany) Daniel Schneider	1–4	(Wales) Ben Jones
(England) Chris Jones	4–1	(Russia) Arsen Balishyan
(Belgium) Alain Van Der Steen	4–3	(Belgium) Daan Leysen
(Germany) Sascha Lippe	4–2	(Belgium) Hans Blanckaert
(Netherlands) Fozan Masood	4–1	(Germany) Jean Luca Nüßgen
(Republic of Ireland) Daniel O’Regan	0–4	(Poland) Kacper Filipiak
(Scotland) Michael Collumb	4–0	(Germany) Joerg Petersen
(Russia) Aleksandr Kurgankov	0–4	(Austria) Andreas Ploner
(Turkey) Özyurt Aksoy	1–4	(Germany) Thomas Hein
(England) James Silverwood	4–0	(Russia) Maxim Maximov
(England) Damian Wilks	4–2	(England) Adam King
(Germany) Fabian Tost	0–4	(England) Ryan Causton
(England) Thomas Barton	3–4	(Belgium) Jurian Heusdens
(Belgium) Johny Moermans	4–0	(Germany) Sebastian Zittermann
(Pakistan) Umar Ali Shaikh	1–4	(Germany) Miro Popovic
(Germany) Lukas Kleckers	1–4	(England) Brandon Sargeant
(England) Nico Elton	4–0	(England) Conor McCormack
(Malta) Alex Borg	4–0	(England) Adam Longley
(Netherlands) Albert Pronk	0–4	(Poland) Mateusz Baranowski
(England) Patrick Whelan	4–0	(Germany) Pedro Chacon
(England) Joshua Baddeley	4–1	(Germany) Julian Maschmeier
(Belgium) Steve Lambrechts	0–4	(England) Hammad Miah
(England) Nick Jennings	4–2	(England) Lewis Gillen
(England) Joe Steele	1–4	(England) Dean Sheridan
(England) Charlie Walters	w/o–w/d	(Poland) Krzysztof Drazkiewicz
(England) Luke Garland	w/d–w/o	(England) Elliot Slessor
(Latvia) Maris Volajs	4–0	(Germany) Dirk Oppenhoff

(Belgium) Tomasz Skalski	1–4	(England) Ashley Hugill
(Belgium) Dirk Lycops	0–4	(Netherlands) Frans Veling
(Republic of Ireland) Dessie Sheehan	0–4	(Scotland) Gary Thomson
(Netherlands) Alexander van den Doel	0–4	(England) Sam Craigie
(Germany) Deitmar Juschka	0–4	(England) Adam Edge
(England) Sam Thistlewhite	4–0	(Germany) Markus Fischer
(Netherlands) Kevin Chan	1–4	(England) Joe O'Connor
(England) Mark Vincent	3–4	(England) Mohammed Rangzib
(Slovakia) Daniel Salis	1–4	(Germany) Habib Shalchian
(England) Richard Beckham	4–2	(Turkey) Ismail Türker
(England) Julian Mills	4–0	(Germany) Julia Litschke
(Netherlands) Manon Melief	0–4	(Republic of Ireland) Brendan O'Donoghue
(England) Christopher Keogan	4–1	(England) Matthew Glasby
(Germany) Robin Otto	4–2	(England) Joe Roberts
(England) Zack Richardson	3–4	(England) Adam Duffy
(Germany) Felix Frede	4–0	(Germany) Rolf Mahr
(Slovakia) Andrej Burdel	0–4	(Germany) Michael Schnabel
(England) Ashley Carty	4–0	(Germany) Kemal Ueruen
(Wales) Jamie Clarke	w/o–w/d	(China) Zhao Xintong
(Austria) Paul Schopf	3–4	(England) Gary Lees
(Germany) Michael Heeger	4–0	(Germany) Pascal Fischer
(England) Christopher Harrison	4–3	(England) Lee Brookes
(Scotland) Mark Owens	4–1	(Germany) Jan Eisenstein
(Scotland) Ross Higgins	4–0	(Germany) Oktay Yildiz
(Poland) Krzysztof Kubicki	1–4	(Republic of Ireland) Josh Boileau
(Belgium) Lieven Vanthournout	2–4	(Belgium) Phuntsok Jaegers
(Poland) Robert Czupryniak	w/o–w/d	(Poland) Bartosz Olchowka

==== Round 2 ====
Best of 7 frames

(Wales) Ben Jones	4–2	(England) Chris Jones
(England) Michael Williams	3–4	(Belgium) Alain Vandersteen
(Wales) Thomas Rees	0–4	(Germany) Sascha Lippe
(Belgium) Luc Blancke	1–4	(Netherlands) Fozan Masood
(England) Joshua Cooper	0–4	(Poland) Kacper Filipiak
(Scotland) Michael Collumb	4–0	(Austria) Andreas Ploner
(Wales) Callum Lloyd	4–0	(Germany) Thomas Hein
(England) James Silverwood	0–4	(England) Damian Wilks
(Wales) Kishan Hirani	4–0	(England) Ryan Causton
(Belgium) Jurian Heusdens	4–1	(Belgium) Johny Moermans
(Belgium) Dennis Deroose	4–1	(Germany) Miro Popovic
(Switzerland) Alexander Ursenbacher	4–2	(England) Brandon Sargeant
(England) Jake Nicholson	1–4	(England) Nico Elton
(Switzerland) Marvin Losi	1–4	(Malta) Alex Borg
(Poland) Mateusz Baranowski	4–0	(England) Patrick Whelan
(Germany) Simon Lichtenberg	3–4	(England) Joshua Baddeley
(England) Hammad Miah	4–2	(England) Nick Jennings
(Belgium) Wan Chooi Tan	1–4	(England) Dean Sheridan
(England) Charlie Walters	2–4	(England) Elliot Slessor

(Poland) Rafal Szymanek	0–4	(Latvia) Maris Volajs
(Belgium) Jeff Jacobs	0–4	(England) Ashley Hugill
(Republic of Ireland) Charlie Sweeney	4–2	(Netherlands) Frans Veling
(England) Oliver Brown	4–1	(Scotland) Gary Thomson
(England) Sam Craigie	4–0	(England) Adam Edge
(Wales) Alex Taubman	1–4	(England) Sam Thistlewhite
(Belgium) Inge Vermeulen	0–4	(England) Joe O'Connor
(England) Mohammed Rangzib	4–0	(Germany) Habib Shalchian
(England) Richard Beckham	2–4	(England) Julian Mills
(France) Stephane Ochoiski	0–4	(Republic of Ireland) Brendan O'Donoghue
(Malta) Brian Cini	4–1	(England) Christopher Keogan
(Germany) Robin Otto	2–4	(England) Adam Duffy
(Germany) Felix Frede	4–3	(Germany) Michael Schnabel
(England) Ashley Carty	4–0	(Wales) Jamie Clarke
(England) Gary Lees	4–1	(Germany) Michael Heeger
(England) Phil O'Kane	4–2	(England) Christopher Harrison
(Scotland) Mark Owens	2–4	(Scotland) Ross Higgins
(Republic of Ireland) Josh Boileau	4–1	(Belgium) Phuntsok Jaegers
(Germany) Volker Grigo	w/d–w/o	(Poland) Robert Czupryniak

==== Round 3 ====
Best of 7 frames

(Wales) Ben Jones	2–4	(Belgium) Alain Vandersteen
(Germany) Sascha Lippe	4–1	(Netherlands) Fozan Masood
(Poland) Kacper Filipiak	3–4	(Scotland) Michael Collumb
(Wales) Callum Lloyd	2–4	(England) Damian Wilks
(Wales) Kishan Hirani	4–3	(Belgium) Jurian Heusdens
(Belgium) Dennis Deroose	0–4	(Switzerland) Alexander Ursenbacher
(England) Nico Elton	1–4	(Malta) Alex Borg
(Poland) Mateusz Baranowski	4–3	(England) Joshua Baddeley
(England) Hammad Miah	4–0	(England) Dean Sheridan
(England) Elliot Slessor	4–0	(Latvia) Maris Volajs

(England) Ashley Hugill	4–2	(Republic of Ireland) Charlie Sweeney
(England) Oliver Brown	1–4	(England) Sam Craigie
(England) Sam Thistlewhite	4–3	(England) Joe O'Connor
(England) Mohammed Rangzib	4–2	(England) Julian Mills
(Republic of Ireland) Brendan O'Donoghue	4–2	(Malta) Brian Cini
(England) Adam Duffy	4–1	(Germany) Felix Frede
(England) Ashley Carty	4–0	(England) Gary Lees
(England) Phil O'Kane	3–4	(Scotland) Ross Higgins
(Republic of Ireland) Josh Boileau	4–1	(Poland) Robert Czupryniak

=== Main rounds ===
==== Top half ====
===== Section 1 =====
Last 128; Best of 7 frames
(England) Ali Carter	w/o
(Thailand) Thepchaiya Un-Nooh	w/d
(Hong Kong) Marco Fu	w/o
(China) Lu Ning	w/d
(England) Stuart Bingham	3
(Republic of Ireland) Fergal O'Brien	4
(England) Mark Davis	4
(Belgium) Alain Vandersteen	0
(Belgium) Luca Brecel	4
(England) Ian Glover	1
(England) Joel Walker	w/d
(England) Jason Weston	w/o
(England) Zak Surety	2
(China) Zhang Anda	4
(China) Liang Wenbo	w/d
(Germany) Sascha Lippe	w/o

Last 64; Best of 7 frames
(England) Ali Carter	4
(Hong Kong) Marco Fu	3
(Republic of Ireland) Fergal O'Brien	3
(England) Mark Davis	4
(Belgium) Luca Brecel	4
(England) Jason Weston	0
(China) Zhang Anda	4
(Germany) Sascha Lippe	1

Last 32; Best of 7 frames
(England) Ali Carter	2
(England) Mark Davis	4
(Belgium) Luca Brecel	4
(China) Zhang Anda	1

Last 16; Best of 7 frames
(England) Mark Davis	4
(Belgium) Luca Brecel	2

===== Section 2 =====
Last 128; Best of 7 frames
(England) Ben Woollaston	4
(Scotland) Michael Collumb	1
(England) Chris Wakelin	4
(Malta) Tony Drago	0
(Wales) Lee Walker	4
(Northern Ireland) Joe Swail	1
(Malaysia) Thor Chuan Leong	4
(England) Damian Wilks	1
(England) Rory McLeod	4
(England) Craig Steadman	2
(Wales) Jamie Jones	4
(England) Michael Georgiou	0
(England) Alfie Burden	4
(England) Paul Davison	0
(England) Mark King	w/o
(England) Chris Melling	w/d

Last 64; Best of 7 frames
(England) Ben Woollaston	4
(England) Chris Wakelin	3
(Wales) Lee Walker	4
(Malaysia) Thor Chuan Leong	2
(England) Rory McLeod	4
(Wales) Jamie Jones	3
(England) Alfie Burden	3
(England) Mark King	4

Last 32; Best of 7 frames
(England) Ben Woollaston	4
(Wales) Lee Walker	2
(England) Rory McLeod	4
(England) Mark King	3

Last 16; Best of 7 frames
(England) Ben Woollaston	1
(England) Rory McLeod	4

===== Section 3 =====
Last 128; Best of 7 frames
(Wales) Mark Williams	4
(Wales) Kishan Hirani	0
(England) Rod Lawler	4
(Switzerland) Alexander Ursenbacher	3
(India) Aditya Mehta	4
(Malta) Alex Borg	1
(England) Kyren Wilson	4
(China) Xiao Guodong	2
(England) Robbie Williams	4
(England) Liam Highfield	3
(England) Mark Selby	4
(England) Michael Wasley	1
(Scotland) Anthony McGill	4
(Poland) Mateusz Baranowski	3
(England) Matthew Selt	4
(Scotland) Eden Sharav	2

Last 64; Best of 7 frames
(Wales) Mark Williams	4
(England) Rod Lawler	3
(India) Aditya Mehta	4
(England) Kyren Wilson	2
(England) Robbie Williams	3
(England) Mark Selby	4
(Scotland) Anthony McGill	4
(England) Matthew Selt	2

Last 32; Best of 7 frames
(Wales) Mark Williams	4
(India) Aditya Mehta	1
(England) Mark Selby	4
(Scotland) Anthony McGill	3

Last 16; Best of 7 frames
(Wales) Mark Williams	4
(England) Mark Selby	3

===== Section 4 =====
Last 128; Best of 7 frames
(England) Judd Trump	3
(England) Hammad Miah	4
(Wales) Daniel Wells	4
(England) Elliot Slessor	3
(England) Mike Dunn	4
(England) Nigel Bond	2
(England) Sean O'Sullivan	4
(Australia) Vinnie Calabrese	2
(England) Jimmy Robertson	4
(England) Mark Joyce	1
(England) Andrew Higginson	4
(Isle of Man) Darryl Hill	0
(England) Robert Milkins	4
(England) Ashley Hugill	0
(England) Tom Ford	w/o
(Thailand) James Wattana	w/d

Last 64; Best of 7 frames
(England) Hammad Miah	4
(Wales) Daniel Wells	1
(England) Mike Dunn	4
(England) Sean O'Sullivan	0
(England) Jimmy Robertson	3
(England) Andrew Higginson	4
(England) Robert Milkins	4
(England) Tom Ford	1

Last 32; Best of 7 frames
(England) Hammad Miah	1
(England) Mike Dunn	4
(England) Andrew Higginson	4
(England) Robert Milkins	2

Last 16; Best of 7 frames
(England) Mike Dunn	4
(England) Andrew Higginson	1

==== Bottom half ====
===== Section 5 =====
Last 128; Best of 7 frames
(England) Shaun Murphy	4
(England) David Grace	2
(England) Peter Lines	0
(England) Sam Craigie	4
(England) Ricky Walden	3
(Northern Ireland) Gerard Greene	4
(Republic of Ireland) Ken Doherty	3
(China) Yu Delu	4
(England) Jamie Cope	0
(Scotland) Rhys Clark	4
(China) Li Hang	4
(England) Sam Thistlewhite	0
(China) Tian Pengfei	4
(England) Sydney Wilson	0
(England) Ian Burns	2
(England) Gary Wilson	4

Last 64; Best of 7 frames
(England) Shaun Murphy	4
(England) Sam Craigie	2
(Northern Ireland) Gerard Greene	4
(China) Yu Delu	0
(Scotland) Rhys Clark	1
(China) Li Hang	4
(China) Tian Pengfei	4
(England) Gary Wilson	1

Last 32; Best of 7 frames
(England) Shaun Murphy	4
(Northern Ireland) Gerard Greene	1
(China) Li Hang	2
(China) Tian Pengfei	4

Last 16; Best of 7 frames
(England) Shaun Murphy	1
(China) Tian Pengfei	4

===== Section 6 =====
Last 128; Best of 7 frames
(Scotland) Alan McManus	4
(England) Barry Pinches	3
(Wales) Matthew Stevens	2
(England) Sam Baird	4
(Scotland) Stephen Maguire	4
(China) Cao Yupeng	0
(Wales) Michael White	4
(Wales) Gareth Allen	0
(England) Martin O'Donnell	2
(China) Zhang Yong	4
(Wales) Duane Jones	w/d
(England) Mohammed Rangzib	w/o
(Wales) Dominic Dale	4
(Thailand) Thanawat Tirapongpaiboon	0
(Scotland) Graeme Dott	4
(Republic of Ireland) Brendan O'Donoghue	1

Last 64; Best of 7 frames
(Scotland) Alan McManus	4
(England) Sam Baird	1
(Scotland) Stephen Maguire	4
(Wales) Michael White	3
(China) Zhang Yong	4
(England) Mohammed Rangzib	1
(Wales) Dominic Dale	4
(Scotland) Graeme Dott	2

Last 32; Best of 7 frames
(Scotland) Alan McManus	4
(Scotland) Stephen Maguire	3
(China) Zhang Yong	2
(Wales) Dominic Dale	4

Last 16; Best of 7 frames
(Scotland) Alan McManus	4
(Wales) Dominic Dale	0

===== Section 7 =====
Last 128; Best of 7 frames
(England) Michael Holt	4
(England) Allan Taylor	3
(England) Mitchell Mann	w/o
(Iran) Hossein Vafaei	w/d
(England) James Cahill	4
(Australia) Neil Robertson	3
(England) David Gilbert	4
(Thailand) Noppon Saengkham	3
(England) Oliver Lines	4
(England) Steven Hallworth	0
(England) Peter Ebdon	4
(England) Anthony Hamilton	3
(Norway) Kurt Maflin	4
(England) Adam Duffy	1
(Wales) Ryan Day	4
(England) Ashley Carty	2

Last 64; Best of 7 frames
(England) Michael Holt	3
(England) Mitchell Mann	4
(England) James Cahill	0
(England) David Gilbert	4
(England) Oliver Lines	2
(England) Peter Ebdon	4
(Norway) Kurt Maflin	4
(Wales) Ryan Day	2

Last 32; Best of 7 frames
(England) Mitchell Mann	1
(England) David Gilbert	4
(England) Peter Ebdon	4
(Norway) Kurt Maflin	2

Last 16; Best of 7 frames
(England) David Gilbert	4
(England) Peter Ebdon	2

===== Section 8 =====
Last 128; Best of 7 frames
(England) Stuart Carrington	4
(Scotland) Ross Higgins	1
(England) Joe Perry	4
(Republic of Ireland) David Morris	1
(England) Jack Lisowski	4
(Scotland) Ross Muir	3
(Northern Ireland) Mark Allen	4
(Republic of Ireland) Josh Boileau	2
(Scotland) Scott Donaldson	3
(China) Lü Chenwei	4
(Thailand) Dechawat Poomjaeng	3
(Scotland) Michael Leslie	4
(Scotland) Fraser Patrick	0
(England) Sanderson Lam	4
(England) Barry Hawkins	4
(England) Jimmy White	3

Last 64; Best of 7 frames
(England) Stuart Carrington	3
(England) Joe Perry	4
(England) Jack Lisowski	2
(Northern Ireland) Mark Allen	4
(China) Lü Chenwei	3
(Scotland) Michael Leslie	4
(England) Sanderson Lam	0
(England) Barry Hawkins	4

Last 32; Best of 7 frames
(England) Joe Perry	3
(Northern Ireland) Mark Allen	4
(Scotland) Michael Leslie	1
(England) Barry Hawkins	4

Last 16; Best of 7 frames
(Northern Ireland) Mark Allen	1
(England) Barry Hawkins	4

==== Finals ====
Quarter-finals; Best of 7 frames		Semi-finals; Best of 7 frames		Final; Best of 7 frames
(England) Mark Davis	3
(England) Rory McLeod	4	(England) Rory McLeod	4
(Wales) Mark Williams	1	(England) Mike Dunn	1
(England) Mike Dunn	4			(England) Rory McLeod	4
(China) Tian Pengfei	4			(China) Tian Pengfei	2
(Scotland) Alan McManus	3	(China) Tian Pengfei	4
(England) David Gilbert	4	(England) David Gilbert	3
(England) Barry Hawkins	2

== Century breaks ==
- 141, 111 – Stuart Carrington
- 140, 135 – Luca Brecel
- 140 – Ross Muir
- 136, 134, 112 – Mike Dunn
- 135, 130, 104, 100 – Robert Milkins
- 134 – Kyren Wilson
- 133, 129, 100 – David Gilbert
- 133, 103 – Kishan Hirani
- 133 – James Cahill
- 132, 130 – Mark Davis
- 131 – Stephen Maguire
- 130 – Mitchell Mann
- 128, 115, 106 – Tian Pengfei
- 126 – Graeme Dott
- 124 – Ashley Carty
- 123, 109 – Anthony McGill
- 122, 121 – Dominic Dale
- 121, 104 – Mark Allen
- 120 – Ben Woollaston
- 120 – Ashley Hugill
- 116 – Rod Lawler
- 112 – Hammad Miah
- 112 – Josh Boileau
- 109 – Neil Robertson
- 108 – Shaun Murphy
- 108 – Gerard Greene
- 108 – Kurt Maflin
- 107 – David Grace
- 106 – Ali Carter
- 106 – Chris Wakelin
- 105 – Barry Hawkins
- 104 – Mark Selby
- 104 – Li Hang
- 104 – Scott Donaldson
- 103 – Alan McManus
- 102 – Andrew Higginson
- 101 – Joe Perry
