= European Tour 2015/2016 – Event 4 =

European Tour 2015/2016 Event 4
Tournament information
- Dates: 4–8 November 2015
- Venue: Universiada Hall
- City: Sofia
- Country: Bulgaria
- Organisation: World Snooker
- Format: Minor-ranking event
- Total prize fund: €125,000
- Winner's share: €25,000
- Highest break: Dominic Dale (WAL) (138)

Final
- Champion: Mark Allen (NIR)
- Runner-up: Ryan Day (WAL)
- Score: 4–0

The European Tour 2015/2016 – Event 4 (also known as the 2015 Victoria Bulgarian Open) was a professional minor-ranking snooker tournament held between 4–8 November 2015 in Sofia, Bulgaria.

The first two days consisted of preliminary rounds. 31 players qualified through these rounds to reach the last-128 stage of the tournament. Days 3 and 4 consist edof 3 rounds; the top half of the draw playing on day 3 and bottom half on day 4. The remaining 16 players played to a conclusion on day 5. All matches were the best of 7 frames.

Mark Allen beat Ryan Day 4–0 in the final. It was his fifth European Tour victory but his first win since August 2014 when he won the 2014 Paul Hunter Classic. The victory gave him entry to the 2015 Champion of Champions which was played the following week.

== Prize fund ==
The breakdown of prize money of the event is shown below:

	Prize fund
Winner	€25,000
Runner-up	€12,000
Semi-finalist	€6,000
Quarter-finalist	€4,000
Last 16	€2,300
Last 32	€1,200
Last 64	€700
Total	€125,000

== Main draw ==
=== Preliminary rounds ===
==== Round 1 ====
Best of 7 frames

(England) Ashley Carty	2–4	(England) Oliver Brown
(Wales) Alex Taubman	4–0	(Canada) Terence Davidson
(England) Jin Foulger	2–4	(England) Adam Edge
(England) Freddie Blunden	1–4	(Belgium) Tomasz Skalski
(Romania) Mihai Vladu	1–4	(Germany) Felix Frede
(Israel) Dana Amir	0–4	(England) Brandon Sargeant
(England) Lewis Gillen	4–1	(Bulgaria) Viktor Iliev
(England) Damian Wilks	1–4	(Switzerland) Alexander Ursenbacher
(Republic of Ireland) Brendan O'Donoghue	4–1	(England) Jeremy Lee
(Bulgaria) Krasimir Kameshev	1–4	(Belgium) Jurian Heusdens
(Austria) Andreas Ploner	4–0	(Bulgaria) Daniel Mladenov
(England) Joe Steele	4–1	(England) Adam Longley
(Poland) Mateusz Baranowski	4–3	(Wales) Ben Jones
(England) Peter Devlin	4–0	(Romania) Razvan Sdrobis
(Bangladesh) Ferdous Bhuyian	3–4	(England) Robbie Purdham
(England) Ashley Hugill	4–1	(England) Jake Nicholson
(England) Phil O'Kane	4–1	(Cyprus) Kyriacos Kyriacou
(Bulgaria) Nikolai Vlashev	0–4	(England) Sam Betts
(England) Joe O'Connor	w/o–w/d	(England) Louis Heathcote
(England) Conor McCormack	w/d–w/o	(Poland) Marcin Nitschke
(England) Nicholas Roberts	4–0	(Bulgaria) Veselin Lazarov
(Romania) Andrei Orzan	1–4	(Republic of Ireland) Josh Boileau
(Bulgaria) Nikola Kemilev	4–1	(Latvia) Rodion Judin
(Scotland) Mark Owens	4–3	(Wales) Kishan Hirani

(England) Elliot Slessor	4–0	(Cyprus) Anastasis Ioannou
(England) Sam Thistlewhite	4–1	(Bulgaria) Sashko Dimitrov
(Romania) Corina Maracine	0–4	(England) Michael Williams
(Romania) Paul Croitoru	0–4	(Wales) Jamie Clarke
(Bulgaria) Nikolai Hristov	1–4	(England) Adam Duffy
(Bulgaria) Bratislav Krustev	4–1	(Bulgaria) Salim Otti
(Bulgaria) David Davidkov	4–0	(Cyprus) Alkinoos Triantos
(Republic of Ireland) Daniel O’Regan	2–4	(Republic of Ireland) Dessie Sheehan
(England) Adam King	w/o–n/s	(Russia) Aleksandr Kurgankov
(England) Sam Craigie	4–0	(Malta) Alex Borg
(Poland) Kacper Filipiak	3–4	(Belgium) Jeff Jacobs
(Germany) Simon Lichtenberg	4–1	(England) Jonathan Mabey
(Poland) Adam Stefanow	2–4	(England) Joe Roberts
(Scotland) Michael Collumb	2–4	(Germany) Lukas Kleckers
(England) Richard Beckham	4–2	(England) Charlie Walters
(Bulgaria) Dimitar Mehandjiiski	0–4	(Germany) Robin Otto
(England) Nico Elton	4–1	(England) Matthew Glasby
(Bulgaria) Spasian Spasov	4–0	(Romania) Gheorghe Margarit
(Bulgaria) Teodor Chomovski	4–0	(Romania) Monica Manolache
(England) Joshua Cooper	4–0	(Bulgaria) Ivan Kupov
(Serbia) Marko Vukovic	n/s–w/o	(England) Hammad Miah
(England) Ryan Causton	4–1	(Malta) Brian Cini
(England) Patrick Whelan	2–4	(Scotland) Marc J Davis
(England) Christopher Keogan	4–1	(Belgium) Hans Blanckaert

==== Round 2 ====
Best of 7 frames

(England) Oliver Brown	4–0	(Wales) Alex Taubman
(England) Adam Edge	3–4	(Belgium) Tomasz Skalski
(Germany) Felix Frede	4–0	(Bulgaria) Julian Petrov
(England) Brandon Sargeant	3–4	(England) Lewis Gillen
(Switzerland) Alexander Ursenbacher	1–4	(Republic of Ireland) Brendan O'Donoghue
(Belgium) Jurian Heusdens	4–0	(Bulgaria) Viktor Gaidov
(Austria) Andreas Ploner	4–1	(Germany) Daniel Schneider
(England) Joe Steele	0–4	(Poland) Mateusz Baranowski
(England) Peter Devlin	4–2	(Wales) Thomas Rees
(England) Robbie Purdham	0–4	(England) Ashley Hugill
(England) Phil O'Kane	4–3	(Romania) Radu Vilau
(England) Sam Betts	0–4	(England) Joe O'Connor
(Poland) Marcin Nitschke	4–0	(England) Nicholas Roberts
(Republic of Ireland) Josh Boileau	4–1	(England) Chris Jones
(Bulgaria) Nikola Kemilev	0–4	(Scotland) Mark Owens
(England) Elliot Slessor	4–0	(Bulgaria) Georgi Georgiev

(England) Sam Thistlewhite	2–4	(England) Michael Williams
(Wales) Jamie Clarke	4–0	(Gibraltar) Chris Mason
(England) Adam Duffy	4–1	(Scotland) Ross Higgins
(Bulgaria) Bratislav Krustev	4–0	(Bulgaria) David Davidkov
(Republic of Ireland) Dessie Sheehan	0–4	(England) Adam King
(England) Sam Craigie	4–1	(Romania) Rares Sinca
(Belgium) Jeff Jacobs	1–4	(Germany) Simon Lichtenberg
(England) Joe Roberts	4–1	(Germany) Lukas Kleckers
(England) Richard Beckham	4–0	(Bulgaria) Hristo Sirakov
(Germany) Robin Otto	0–4	(England) Nico Elton
(Bulgaria) Spasian Spasov	0–4	(England) George Pragnall
(Bulgaria) Teodor Chomovski	1–4	(England) John Parkin
(England) Joshua Cooper	1–4	(England) Hammad Miah
(England) Ryan Causton	4–1	(Bulgaria) Stefan Simeonovski
(Scotland) Marc J Davis	2–4	(England) Christopher Keogan

=== Main rounds ===
==== Top half ====
===== Section 1 =====
Last 128; Best of 7 frames
(England) Rory McLeod	0
(England) Sam Baird	4
(China) Zhang Anda	4
(England) Oliver Brown	2
(England) Chris Wakelin	3
(England) Chris Melling	4
(England) Ian Burns	4
(England) Paul Davison	3
(England) Jimmy Robertson	4
(England) Allan Taylor	1
(Scotland) Michael Leslie	4
(Belgium) Tomasz Skalski	3
(England) Rod Lawler	4
(England) Liam Highfield	1
(England) Matthew Selt	4
(Pakistan) Hamza Akbar	2

Last 64; Best of 7 frames
(England) Sam Baird	4
(China) Zhang Anda	0
(England) Chris Melling	4
(England) Ian Burns	0
(England) Jimmy Robertson	4
(Scotland) Michael Leslie	3
(England) Rod Lawler	4
(England) Matthew Selt	3

Last 32; Best of 7 frames
(England) Sam Baird	4
(England) Chris Melling	0
(England) Jimmy Robertson	4
(England) Rod Lawler	0

Last 16; Best of 7 frames
(England) Sam Baird	4
(England) Jimmy Robertson	3

===== Section 2 =====
Last 128; Best of 7 frames
(England) Judd Trump	4
(Germany) Felix Frede	0
(Northern Ireland) Gerard Greene	4
(Wales) Gareth Allen	2
(Scotland) Rhys Clark	4
(England) Lewis Gillen	2
(England) Andrew Higginson	4
(England) Craig Steadman	2
(England) Peter Ebdon	4
(Republic of Ireland) Brendan O'Donoghue	2
(Republic of Ireland) Fergal O'Brien	4
(England) Michael Georgiou	2
(Scotland) Anthony McGill	4
(England) Barry Pinches	3
(England) Mark King	4
(Belgium) Jurian Heusdens	2

Last 64; Best of 7 frames
(England) Judd Trump	4
(Northern Ireland) Gerard Greene	1
(Scotland) Rhys Clark	1
(England) Andrew Higginson	4
(England) Peter Ebdon	2
(Republic of Ireland) Fergal O'Brien	4
(Scotland) Anthony McGill	3
(England) Mark King	4

Last 32; Best of 7 frames
(England) Judd Trump	4
(England) Andrew Higginson	2
(Republic of Ireland) Fergal O'Brien	4
(England) Mark King	3

Last 16; Best of 7 frames
(England) Judd Trump	4
(Republic of Ireland) Fergal O'Brien	2

===== Section 3 =====
Last 128; Best of 7 frames
(Scotland) Alan McManus	4
(Austria) Andreas Ploner	1
(England) Jack Lisowski	4
(Poland) Mateusz Baranowski	1
(England) Mitchell Mann	4
(Malta) Tony Drago	0
(Wales) Dominic Dale	4
(England) Peter Devlin	1
(England) Mark Selby	4
(England) Sydney Wilson	0
(England) Alfie Burden	4
(England) Anthony Hamilton	3
(England) Jamie Cope	3
(Scotland) Eden Sharav	4
(Belgium) Luca Brecel	4
(China) Lu Ning	1

Last 64; Best of 7 frames
(Scotland) Alan McManus	4
(England) Jack Lisowski	0
(England) Mitchell Mann	2
(Wales) Dominic Dale	4
(England) Mark Selby	4
(England) Alfie Burden	2
(Scotland) Eden Sharav	4
(Belgium) Luca Brecel	1

Last 32; Best of 7 frames
(Scotland) Alan McManus	0
(Wales) Dominic Dale	4
(England) Mark Selby	4
(Scotland) Eden Sharav	2

Last 16; Best of 7 frames
(Wales) Dominic Dale	2
(England) Mark Selby	4

===== Section 4 =====
Last 128; Best of 7 frames
(Wales) Ryan Day	4
(England) Ashley Hugill	0
(England) Joel Walker	4
(Egypt) Hatem Yassen	0
(Norway) Kurt Maflin	4
(England) Steven Hallworth	2
(England) Kyren Wilson	4
(England) Phil O'Kane	0
(Scotland) Scott Donaldson	2
(England) Mark Joyce	4
(England) Martin O'Donnell	4
(England) Joe O'Connor	3
(England) James Cahill	0
(England) Zak Surety	4
(England) Tom Ford	4
(England) Michael Wasley	3

Last 64; Best of 7 frames
(Wales) Ryan Day	4
(England) Joel Walker	0
(Norway) Kurt Maflin	2
(England) Kyren Wilson	4
(England) Mark Joyce	4
(England) Martin O'Donnell	1
(England) Zak Surety	0
(England) Tom Ford	4

Last 32; Best of 7 frames
(Wales) Ryan Day	4
(England) Kyren Wilson	3
(England) Mark Joyce	4
(England) Tom Ford	1

Last 16; Best of 7 frames
(Wales) Ryan Day	4
(England) Mark Joyce	3

==== Bottom half ====
===== Section 5 =====
Last 128; Best of 7 frames
(China) Tian Pengfei	w/d
(Poland) Marcin Nitschke	w/o
(England) Sanderson Lam	3
(England) Nigel Bond	4
(England) Stuart Bingham	4
(Republic of Ireland) Josh Boileau	0
(Northern Ireland) Mark Allen	4
(Scotland) Ross Muir	0
(England) Sean O'Sullivan	4
(Northern Ireland) Joe Swail	1
(England) Joe Perry	4
(Scotland) Mark Owens	0
(England) Martin Gould	4
(England) Elliot Slessor	0
(England) Michael Holt	4
(England) Michael Williams	2

Last 64; Best of 7 frames
(Poland) Marcin Nitschke	0
(England) Nigel Bond	4
(England) Stuart Bingham	3
(Northern Ireland) Mark Allen	4
(England) Sean O'Sullivan	1
(England) Joe Perry	4
(England) Martin Gould	3
(England) Michael Holt	4

Last 32; Best of 7 frames
(England) Nigel Bond	1
(Northern Ireland) Mark Allen	4
(England) Joe Perry	2
(England) Michael Holt	4

Last 16; Best of 7 frames
(Northern Ireland) Mark Allen	4
(England) Michael Holt	0

===== Section 6 =====
Last 128; Best of 7 frames
(England) Mike Dunn	4
(Wales) Jamie Clarke	0
(India) Aditya Mehta	4
(England) Adam Duffy	3
(England) Robert Milkins	4
(Bulgaria) Bratislav Krustev	1
(China) Liang Wenbo	4
(Thailand) Thepchaiya Un-Nooh	1
(Malaysia) Thor Chuan Leong	4
(England) Adam King	1
(England) Gary Wilson	4
(England) David Grace	1
(Wales) Daniel Wells	4
(England) Ian Glover	0
(England) Ben Woollaston	1
(China) Xiao Guodong	4

Last 64; Best of 7 frames
(England) Mike Dunn	4
(India) Aditya Mehta	1
(England) Robert Milkins	4
(China) Liang Wenbo	3
(Malaysia) Thor Chuan Leong	0
(England) Gary Wilson	4
(Wales) Daniel Wells	4
(China) Xiao Guodong	3

Last 32; Best of 7 frames
(England) Mike Dunn	4
(England) Robert Milkins	3
(England) Gary Wilson	1
(Wales) Daniel Wells	4

Last 16; Best of 7 frames
(England) Mike Dunn	4
(Wales) Daniel Wells	0

===== Section 7 =====
Last 128; Best of 7 frames
(Wales) Mark Williams	4
(England) Sam Craigie	0
(Wales) Jamie Jones	4
(Thailand) Noppon Saengkham	3
(Republic of Ireland) Ken Doherty	w/o
(England) Jimmy White	w/d
(England) Oliver Lines	4
(Germany) Simon Lichtenberg	1
(Wales) Lee Walker	3
(England) Joe Roberts	4
(China) Lü Chenwei	1
(China) Zhou Yuelong	4
(Scotland) John Higgins	4
(England) Richard Beckham	1
(England) David Gilbert	w/o
(Scotland) Jamie Burnett	w/d

Last 64; Best of 7 frames
(Wales) Mark Williams	4
(Wales) Jamie Jones	1
(Republic of Ireland) Ken Doherty	0
(England) Oliver Lines	4
(England) Joe Roberts	0
(China) Zhou Yuelong	4
(Scotland) John Higgins	4
(England) David Gilbert	3

Last 32; Best of 7 frames
(Wales) Mark Williams	4
(England) Oliver Lines	1
(China) Zhou Yuelong	1
(Scotland) John Higgins	4

Last 16; Best of 7 frames
(Wales) Mark Williams	4
(Scotland) John Higgins	0

===== Section 8 =====
Last 128; Best of 7 frames
(England) Stuart Carrington	4
(England) Nico Elton	2
(Thailand) Dechawat Poomjaeng	3
(England) George Pragnall	4
(England) Ricky Walden	4
(Scotland) Fraser Patrick	1
(Wales) Michael White	4
(England) John Parkin	0
(England) Robbie Williams	0
(England) Hammad Miah	4
(England) Peter Lines	0
(Isle of Man) Darryl Hill	4
(England) Jason Weston	4
(England) Ryan Causton	2
(England) Shaun Murphy	4
(England) Christopher Keogan	1

Last 64; Best of 7 frames
(England) Stuart Carrington	4
(England) George Pragnall	1
(England) Ricky Walden	4
(Wales) Michael White	3
(England) Hammad Miah	4
(Isle of Man) Darryl Hill	2
(England) Jason Weston	0
(England) Shaun Murphy	4

Last 32; Best of 7 frames
(England) Stuart Carrington	4
(England) Ricky Walden	2
(England) Hammad Miah	2
(England) Shaun Murphy	4

Last 16; Best of 7 frames
(England) Stuart Carrington	1
(England) Shaun Murphy	4

==== Finals ====
Quarter-finals; Best of 7 frames		Semi-finals; Best of 7 frames		Final; Best of 7 frames
(England) Sam Baird	4
(England) Judd Trump	1	(England) Sam Baird	2
(England) Mark Selby	0	(Wales) Ryan Day	4
(Wales) Ryan Day	4			(Wales) Ryan Day	0
(Northern Ireland) Mark Allen	4			(Northern Ireland) Mark Allen	4
(England) Mike Dunn	3	(Northern Ireland) Mark Allen	4
(Wales) Mark Williams	4	(Wales) Mark Williams	0
(England) Shaun Murphy	3

== Century breaks ==
- 138, 133, 104 – Dominic Dale
- 133 – Barry Pinches
- 130, 124 – Sam Baird
- 129 – Aditya Mehta
- 128, 127, 118, 111, 100 – Mark Williams
- 127, 102, 100 – Mark Allen
- 126, 119, 111 – Judd Trump
- 126, 110 – Ryan Day
- 123, 114, 109, 106 – Joe Perry
- 123, 112 – Xiao Guodong
- 123 – Ricky Walden
- 119, 102 – Peter Ebdon
- 118, 106, 100, 100 – Shaun Murphy
- 116 – John Higgins
- 116 – Jimmy Robertson
- 115 – Andrew Higginson
- 115 – Zak Surety
- 112 – Joel Walker
- 112 – Mitchell Mann
- 111, 105 – Michael White
- 110 – Michael Holt
- 109 – Stuart Carrington
- 107 – Josh Boileau
- 106 – Mark Selby
- 103, 103 – Daniel Wells
- 103 – Jack Lisowski
- 102 – Anthony McGill
- 100 – Michael Wasley
- 100 – Eden Sharav
- 100 – Ryan Causton
