= 2015 China Open (snooker) =

BAIC Motor China Open
Tournament information
- Dates: 30 March – 5 April 2015
- Venue: Beijing University Students' Gymnasium
- City: Beijing
- Country: China
- Organisation: World Snooker
- Format: Ranking event
- Total prize fund: £478,000
- Winner's share: £85,000
- Highest break: Mark Selby (ENG) (145)

Final
- Champion: Mark Selby (ENG)
- Runner-up: Gary Wilson (ENG)
- Score: 10–2

The 2015 BAIC Motor China Open was a professional ranking snooker tournament, that took place between 30 March and 5 April 2015 at the Beijing University Students' Gymnasium in Beijing, China. It was the tenth ranking event of the 2014–15 season.

Ding Junhui was the defending champion, but he lost 5–6 against Gary Wilson in the semi-finals.

Mark Selby defeated Wilson 10–2 to win his sixth career ranking title, his second of the season, and his first China Open title after being twice runner-up (in 2011 and 2013). The tournament was Wilson's first ranking event final.

== Prize fund ==
The breakdown of prize money for this year is shown below:

- Winner: £85,000
- Runner-up: £35,000
- Semi-final: £21,000
- Quarter-final: £12,500
- Last 16: £8,000
- Last 32: £6,500
- Last 64: £3,000
- Televised highest break: £2,000
- Total: £478,000

== Wildcard round ==
These matches were played in Beijing on 30 March 2015.

Match		Score	
WC1	Alex Davies (ENG)	0–5	Zhao Xintong (CHN)
WC2	Robin Hull (FIN)	5–1	Yan Bingtao (CHN)
WC3	Peter Lines (ENG)	5–3	Yuan Sijun (CHN)
WC4	Zhou Yuelong (CHN)	5–2	Zhang Yong (CHN)

== Main draw ==
Last 64; Best of 9 frames
(China) Ding Junhui	5
(Scotland) Marcus Campbell	1
(England) Kyren Wilson	3
(England) Mark Davis	5
(Wales) Mark Williams	5
(China) Zhao Xintong	2
(England) Joe O'Connor	1
(Scotland) Michael Leslie	5
(Scotland) John Higgins	5
(China) Yu Delu	3
(Wales) Daniel Wells	3
(Scotland) Graeme Dott	5
(England) Peter Ebdon	5
(China) Zhang Anda	4
(England) Andrew Higginson	3
(England) Judd Trump	5
(England) Barry Hawkins	5
(Northern Ireland) Gerard Greene	2
(England) Jimmy Robertson	3
(Wales) Dominic Dale	5
(Wales) Ryan Day	5
(England) Liam Highfield	1
(Republic of Ireland) David Morris	1
(Scotland) Stephen Maguire	5
(England) Ricky Walden	5
(China) Cao Yupeng	0
(England) Gary Wilson	5
(China) Liang Wenbo	3
(Scotland) Alan McManus	4
(England) Jack Lisowski	5
(Thailand) Dechawat Poomjaeng	5
(Australia) Neil Robertson	4
(England) Ronnie O'Sullivan	w/d
(Finland) Robin Hull	w/o
(Scotland) Jamie Burnett	3
(England) Mark King	5
(Republic of Ireland) Fergal O'Brien	3
(England) Mike Dunn	5
(Norway) Kurt Maflin	5
(England) Ali Carter	4
(Hong Kong) Marco Fu	5
(England) Ashley Carty	0
(Wales) Jamie Jones	5
(Wales) Matthew Stevens	3
(Scotland) Anthony McGill	5
(England) Alfie Burden	1
(England) Jamie Cope	1
(England) Shaun Murphy	5
(England) Stuart Bingham	5
(England) Peter Lines	1
(Republic of Ireland) Ken Doherty	4
(Wales) Michael White	5
(Northern Ireland) Joe Swail	4
(England) Zak Surety	5
(England) Nigel Bond	3
(England) Robert Milkins	5
(England) Joe Perry	3
(England) David Gilbert	5
(England) Anthony Hamilton	1
(China) Zhou Yuelong	5
(England) Elliot Slessor	5
(England) Matthew Selt	3
(England) Mark Joyce	3
(England) Mark Selby	5

Last 32; Best of 9 frames
(China) Ding Junhui	5
(England) Mark Davis	1
(Wales) Mark Williams	5
(Scotland) Michael Leslie	0
(Scotland) John Higgins	5
(Scotland) Graeme Dott	2
(England) Peter Ebdon	1
(England) Judd Trump	5
(England) Barry Hawkins	5
(Wales) Dominic Dale	2
(Wales) Ryan Day	4
(Scotland) Stephen Maguire	5
(England) Ricky Walden	2
(England) Gary Wilson	5
(England) Jack Lisowski	0
(Thailand) Dechawat Poomjaeng	5
(Finland) Robin Hull	5
(England) Mark King	4
(England) Mike Dunn	3
(Norway) Kurt Maflin	5
(Hong Kong) Marco Fu	4
(Wales) Jamie Jones	5
(Scotland) Anthony McGill	4
(England) Shaun Murphy	5
(England) Stuart Bingham	4
(Wales) Michael White	5
(England) Zak Surety	4
(England) Robert Milkins	5
(England) David Gilbert	5
(China) Zhou Yuelong	2
(England) Elliot Slessor	0
(England) Mark Selby	5

Last 16; Best of 9 frames
(China) Ding Junhui	5
(Wales) Mark Williams	2
(Scotland) John Higgins	5
(England) Judd Trump	4
(England) Barry Hawkins	5
(Scotland) Stephen Maguire	3
(England) Gary Wilson	5
(Thailand) Dechawat Poomjaeng	1
(Finland) Robin Hull	1
(Norway) Kurt Maflin	5
(Wales) Jamie Jones	3
(England) Shaun Murphy	5
(Wales) Michael White	1
(England) Robert Milkins	5
(England) David Gilbert	2
(England) Mark Selby	5

Quarter-finals; Best of 9 frames
(China) Ding Junhui	5
(Scotland) John Higgins	4
(England) Barry Hawkins	3
(England) Gary Wilson	5
(Norway) Kurt Maflin	5
(England) Shaun Murphy	4
(England) Robert Milkins	4
(England) Mark Selby	5

Semi-finals; Best of 11 frames
(China) Ding Junhui	5
(England) Gary Wilson	6
(Norway) Kurt Maflin	3
(England) Mark Selby	6

Final; Best of 19 frames
(England) Gary Wilson	2
(England) Mark Selby	10

== Final ==
Final: Best of 19 frames. Referee: Brendan Moore. Beijing University Students' Gymnasium, Beijing, China, 5 April 2015.
Gary Wilson; England	2–10	Mark Selby; England
Afternoon: 39–74, 43–87 (51), 41–56, 91–1 (91), 36–70, 40–78 (54), 0–145 (145), 3–72, 0–86; Evening: 0–136 (136), 101–0 (101), 32–83
101	Highest break	145
1	Century breaks	2
2	50+ breaks	4

== Qualifying ==
These matches were held on 14 and 15 February 2015 at the Barnsley Metrodome in Barnsley, England. All matches were best of 9 frames.

(China) Ding Junhui	5–1	(Scotland) Ross Muir
(Scotland) Marcus Campbell	5–2	(China) Lu Chenwei
(England) Kyren Wilson	5–3	(England) Matthew Day
(England) Mark Davis	5–3	(England) Mitchell Mann
(Wales) Mark Williams	5–1	(Wales) Lee Walker
(England) Tom Ford	3–5	(England) Alex Davies
(England) Ben Woollaston	2–5	(England) Joe O'Connor
(Northern Ireland) Mark Allen	1–5	(Scotland) Michael Leslie
(Scotland) John Higgins	5–2	(England) Oliver Lines
(China) Yu Delu	5–3	(England) Chris Norbury
(England) Robbie Williams	3–5	(Wales) Daniel Wells
(Scotland) Graeme Dott	5–1	(England) Sean O'Sullivan
(England) Peter Ebdon	5–3	(England) Sam Baird
(India) Aditya Mehta	2–5	(China) Zhang Anda
(England) Andrew Higginson	5–0	(England) Hammad Miah
(England) Judd Trump	5–0	(Scotland) Eden Sharav
(England) Barry Hawkins	5–1	(Thailand) Noppon Saengkham
(Northern Ireland) Gerard Greene	5–1	(England) Chris Wakelin
(England) Jimmy Robertson	5–3	(England) Steven Hallworth
(Wales) Dominic Dale	5–2	(England) Ian Glover
(Wales) Ryan Day	5–0	(England) Sydney Wilson
(Thailand) Thepchaiya Un-Nooh	1–5	(England) Liam Highfield
(Republic of Ireland) David Morris	5–1	(Wales) Jamie Clarke
(Scotland) Stephen Maguire	5–2	(England) Lee Page
(England) Ricky Walden	5–2	(England) David Grace
(China) Cao Yupeng	5–2	(England) Adam Bobat
(England) Gary Wilson	5–3	(Wales) Jak Jones
(China) Liang Wenbo	5–2	(England) Joel Walker
(Scotland) Alan McManus	5–3	(China) Tian Pengfei
(England) Jack Lisowski	5–0	(Qatar) Ahmed Saif
(Thailand) Dechawat Poomjaeng	5–1	(England) James Cahill
(Australia) Neil Robertson	5–3	(China) Lyu Haotian

(England) Ronnie O'Sullivan	5–1	(Belgium) Luca Brecel
(England) Rory McLeod	3–5	(Finland) Robin Hull
(Scotland) Jamie Burnett	5–3	(England) Ian Burns
(England) Mark King	5–2	(China) Lu Ning
(Republic of Ireland) Fergal O'Brien	5–2	(England) George Pragnall
(England) Mike Dunn	5–3	(Thailand) Thanawat Thirapongpaiboon
(Norway) Kurt Maflin	5–3	(China) Cao Xinlong
(England) Ali Carter	5–1	(Republic of Ireland) Martin McCrudden
(Hong Kong) Marco Fu	5–2	(England) Michael Georgiou
(England) Jimmy White	4–5	(England) Ashley Carty
(Wales) Jamie Jones	5–2	(England) Michael Tomlinson
(Wales) Matthew Stevens	5–0	(Scotland) Mark Owens
(Scotland) Anthony McGill	5–3	(Switzerland) Alexander Ursenbacher
(England) Alfie Burden	5–4	(England) Allan Taylor
(England) Jamie Cope	5–3	(Malaysia) Thor Chuan Leong
(England) Shaun Murphy	5–1	(Brazil) Igor Figueiredo
(England) Stuart Bingham	5–0	(Scotland) Scott Donaldson
(England) Peter Lines	5–4	(England) Chris Melling
(Republic of Ireland) Ken Doherty	5–4	(England) Dave Harold
(Wales) Michael White	5–2	(Thailand) James Wattana
(England) Rod Lawler	2–5	(Northern Ireland) Joe Swail
(China) Li Hang	4–5	(England) Zak Surety
(England) Nigel Bond	5–2	(England) Craig Steadman
(England) Robert Milkins	5–0	(England) Stuart Carrington
(England) Joe Perry	5–2	(England) Oliver Brown
(England) David Gilbert	5–2	(England) Adam Duffy
(England) Anthony Hamilton	5–0	(England) Michael Wasley
(England) Michael Holt	1–5	(China) Zhou Yuelong
(China) Xiao Guodong	4–5	(England) Elliot Slessor
(England) Matthew Selt	5–0	(England) John Astley
(England) Mark Joyce	5–2	(Scotland) Fraser Patrick
(England) Mark Selby	5–1	(England) Barry Pinches

== Century breaks ==
=== Qualifying stage centuries ===
- 134 – Robert Milkins
- 132, 111 – Dechawat Poomjaeng
- 128 – Zhou Yuelong
- 128 – Dave Harold
- 125 – Mark Williams
- 124 – Ronnie O'Sullivan
- 123 – Stuart Bingham
- 122 – Barry Pinches
- 120, 108 – Liang Wenbo
- 120 – Jimmy Robertson
- 117 – Luca Brecel
- 115 – David Grace
- 112 – John Higgins
- 111 – Alfie Burden
- 111 – Judd Trump
- 110 – Chris Wakelin
- 109 – Fergal O'Brien
- 104 – Stephen Maguire
- 101 – Liam Highfield
- 100 – Joe Swail
- 100 – Ryan Day

=== Televised stage centuries ===
- 145, 136, 131, 126, 106 – Mark Selby
- 143, 113 – Shaun Murphy
- 138, 124 – Barry Hawkins
- 133 – Marco Fu
- 132, 112 – Robin Hull
- 132 – Daniel Wells
- 129, 128, 113, 106, 103, 101 – Kurt Maflin
- 128 – Robert Milkins
- 127, 101, 100 – Judd Trump
- 123 – Matthew Selt
- 120 – Mark Davis
- 116 – David Morris
- 114, 101 – Gary Wilson
- 114 – John Higgins
- 112 – Graeme Dott
- 106 – Andrew Higginson
- 105, 103 – Ding Junhui
- 105 – Michael White
- 103 – Dominic Dale
- 102, 100 – Jamie Jones
