= 2014 Q School =

Snooker tournaments

Tournament information
- Dates: 10–21 May 2014
- Venue: Capital Venue
- City: Gloucester
- Country: England
- Format: Qualifying School
- Qualifiers: 8 via the 2 events

The 2014 Q School was a series of two snooker tournaments held at the start of the 2014–15 snooker season. An event for amateur players, it served as a qualification event for a place on the professional World Snooker Tour for the following two seasons. The events took place in May 2014 at the Capital Venue in Gloucester, England with a total eight players qualifying via the two tournaments.

== Format ==
The 2014 Q School consisted of two events with eight qualification places available. Previously there had been three events with a total of 12 places available. The entry fee was reduced from £1,000 to £600. The two events had 145 entries competing for the eight places on the main tour, four players qualifying from each of the two events. All matches were the best of seven frames.

== Event 1 ==
The first 2014 Q School event was held from 10 to 15 May 2014. Craig Steadman, Chris Melling, Zhang Anda and Tian Pengfei qualified. The results of the four final matches are given below.

- Craig Steadman (ENG) 4–0 John Sutton (IRL)
- Chris Melling (ENG) 4–3 Duane Jones (WAL)
- Zhang Anda (CHN) 4–3 Jamie Clarke (WAL)
- Tian Pengfei (CHN) 4–0 Eden Sharav (SCO)

== Event 2 ==
The second 2014 Q School event was held from 16 to 21 May 2014. Liam Highfield, Michael Georgiou, Lee Walker and Michael Leslie qualified. Wells had previously held a tour card. The results of the four final matches are given below.

- Liam Highfield (ENG) 4–2 Alex Pagulayan (CAN)
- Michael Georgiou (ENG) 4–2 Ashley Carty (ENG)
- Lee Walker (WAL) 4–1 Joe O'Connor (ENG)
- Michael Leslie (SCO) 4–3 Eden Sharav (SCO)

== Q School Order of Merit ==
A Q School Order of Merit was produced for players who didn't qualify from the two events. The Order of Merit was used to top up fields for the 2014–15 snooker season where an event failed to attract the required number of entries. The rankings in the Order of Merit were based on the number of frames won in the two Q School events. Players who received a bye into the second round were awarded four points for round one. Where players were equal, those who won the most frames in the first event were ranked higher.

The leading players in the Q School Order of Merit are given below.

Rank	Player	Event 1	Event 2	Total
1	(Scotland) Eden Sharav	20	23	43
T2	(England) Ashley Carty	18	22	40
T2	(Canada) Alex Pagulayan	18	22	40
4	(Wales) Jamie Clarke	23	15	38
5	(Wales) Daniel Wells	15	19	34
6	(Republic of Ireland) John Sutton	20	12	32
7	(China) Chen Zhe	17	15	32
8	(England) Oliver Brown	14	18	32
9	(England) Joe O'Connor	9	21	30
10	(Wales) Duane Jones	23	6	29

== Two-season performance of qualifiers ==
The following table shows the rankings of the 8 qualifiers from the 2014 Q School, at the end of the 2015–16 snooker season, the end of their two guaranteed seasons on the tour, together with their tour status for the 2016–17 snooker season. Players in the top-64 of the rankings retained their place on the tour while those outside the top-64 lost their place unless they qualified under a different category.

Player	End of 2015–16 season		Status for 2016–17 season
Player	Money	Ranking	Status for 2016–17 season
Craig Steadman (ENG)	42,999	68	Qualified through the 2016 Q School
Chris Melling (ENG)	12,757	91	Amateur
Zhang Anda (CHN)	45,816	65	Qualified through the Asian Tour Order of Merit
Tian Pengfei (CHN)	74,616	48	Retained place on tour
Liam Highfield (ENG)	44,716	67	Qualified through the European Tour Order of Merit
Michael Georgiou (ENG)	28,591	76	Qualified through the 2016 Q School
Lee Walker (WAL)	32,833	74	Qualified through the European Tour Order of Merit
Michael Leslie (SCO)	11,422	93	Amateur
