= Liam Highfield =

English snooker player (born 1990)

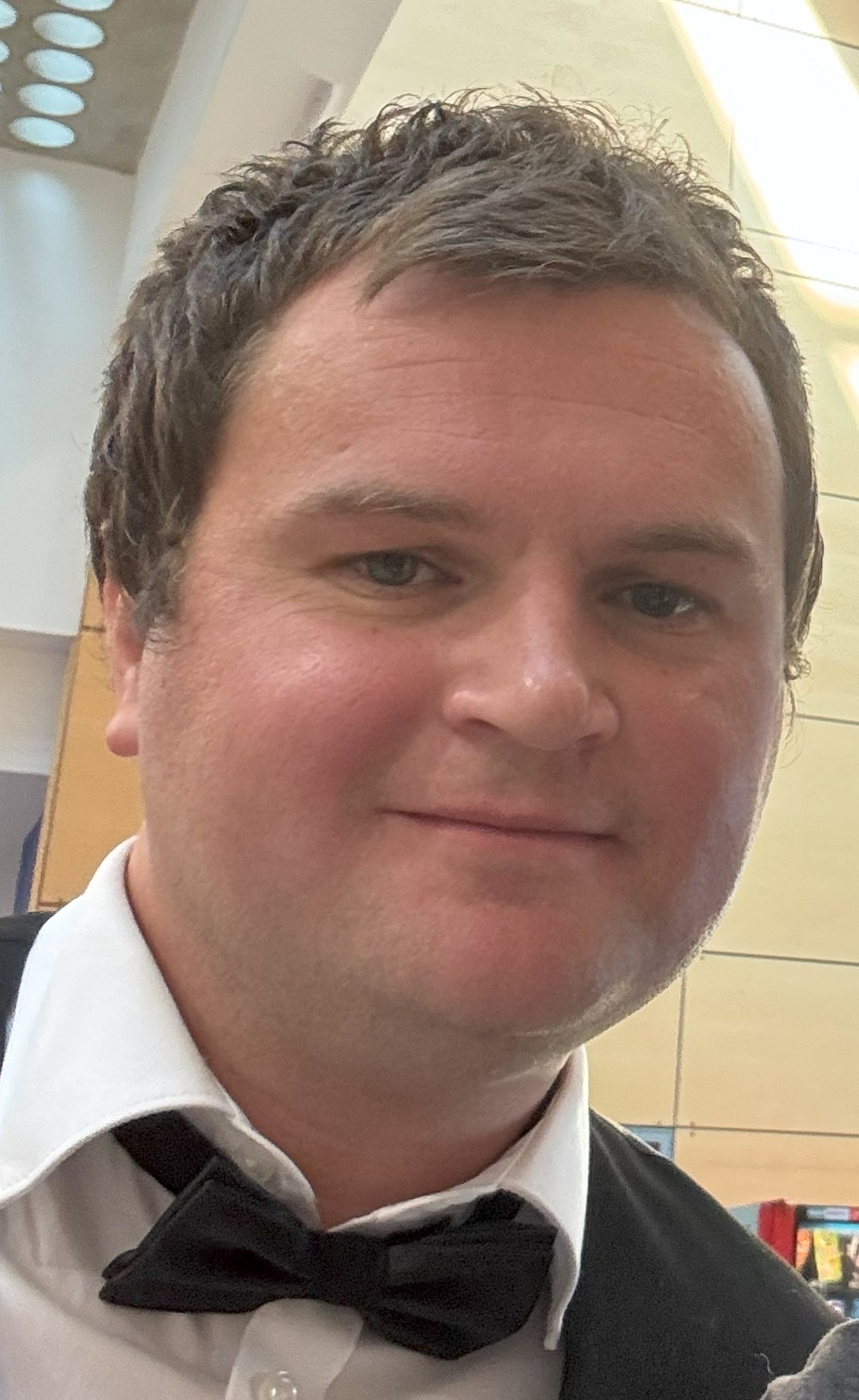
- Highfield in 2025

Personal information
- Born: 1 December 1990 (age 35) Swindon, England

Sport
- Country: England
- Sport: Snooker
- Professional: 2010–2024, 2025–present
- Highest ranking: 39 (May 2022)
- Current ranking: 62 (as of 26 October 2026)
- Maximum breaks: 1
- Century breaks: 140 (as of 6 November 2026)
- Best ranking finish: Semi-final

Liam Highfield (born 1 December 1990) is an English professional snooker player. He turned professional in 2010 after finishing second in the 2009/2010 PIOS rankings. He plays left-handed.

== Career ==
=== Early life and amateur years ===
Highfield is from Swindon and began playing snooker as a young boy. ln the 2007/2008 season, Highfield won the final event of the PIOS International Open Series and finished 12th in the rankings. The following season, he finished 33rd.

In the 2009/2010 season, he won the second event of the International Open Series and was runner-up in both the first and sixth events, finishing second in the rankings. Thus, Highfield received a place on the professional Main Tour for the 2010/2011 season.

=== 2011/2012 season ===
At the beginning of this season, Highfield was ranked number 68 in the world, meaning he was required to win four qualifying matches to reach the main stage of the ranking events. He did not manage this throughout the season, coming closest in the first event of the year, the Australian Goldfields Open. He beat Simon Bedford and Xiao Guodong both by deciding frames and received a bye through to the final qualifying round because Steve Davis withdrew. There he lost to Dominic Dale 3–5. He could only win three more matches in qualifying for the remainder of the season and finished it ranked number 66, out of the top 64 who retained their places for the 2012/2013 season.

However, Highfield's performances in the 10 PTC events he played in (where he reached the last 16 twice) were enough to ensure him a spot on the tour for next year.

=== 2012/2013 season ===
Highfield reached the final qualifying round of ranking events on two occasions during the 2012/2013 season. The first of these was in World Open qualifying in December, where he beat Daniel Wells 5–2, Barry Pinches 5–1 and Liang Wenbo 5–4. He faced 2002 world champion Peter Ebdon in the final round and, in a match which lasted five hours and 40 minutes, Highfield was edged out 4–5. His other run to the last round was in World Championship qualifying, which saw him defeat Simon Bedford 10–6, Pinches and Jamie Jones both by 10–9 scorelines, before losing 4–10 to Marcus Campbell. Throughout the season Highfield played in nine of the ten Players Tour Championship events, with his best result coming in the sixth European Tour Event, where he saw off Yu Delu, Tony Drago and Dominic Dale, but then lost 1–4 to Kurt Maflin in the last 16. He was placed 69th on the PTC Order of Merit and dropped 10 places in the world rankings during the season to end it world number 76.

=== 2013/2014 season ===
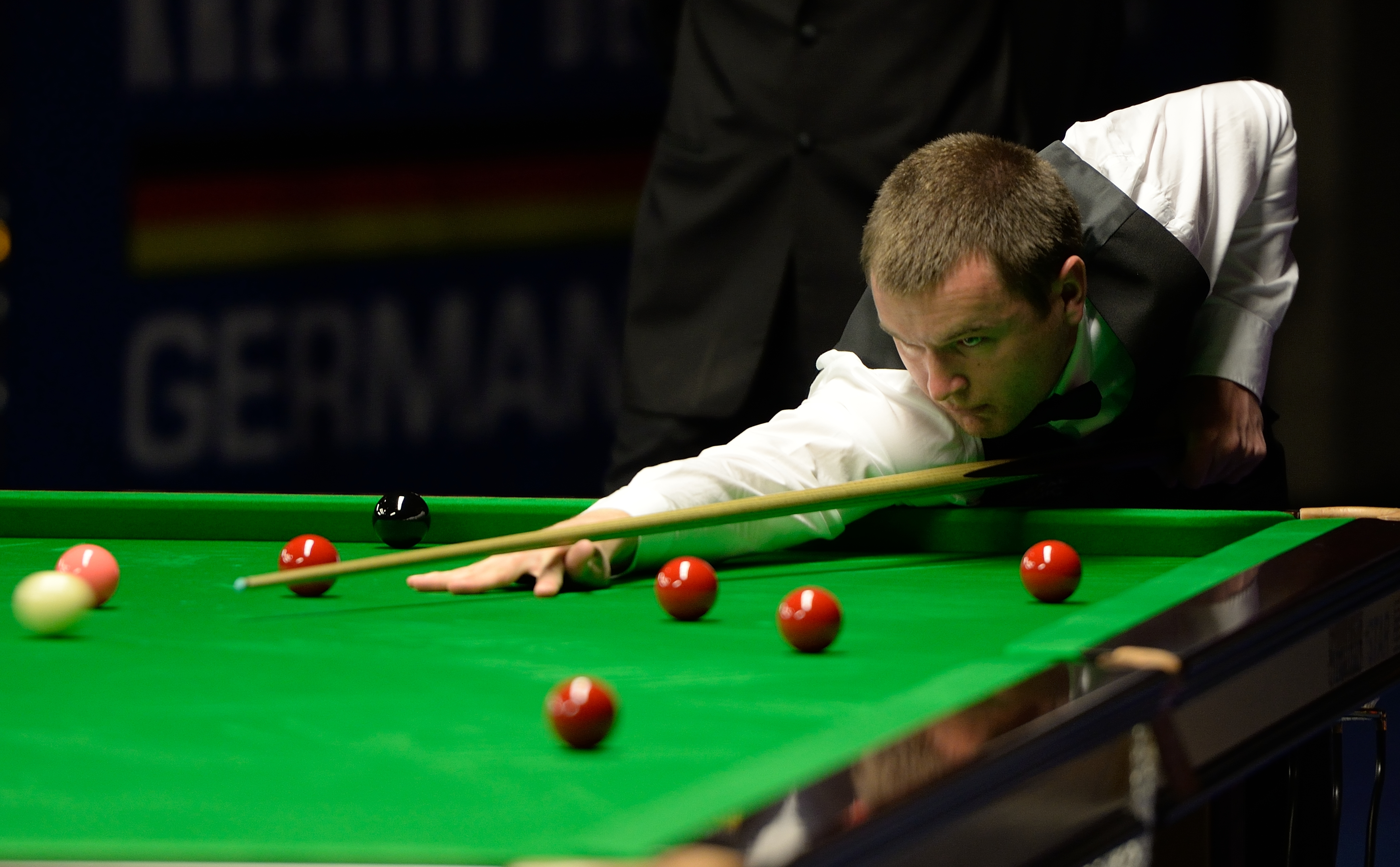
Highfield at the 2015 German Masters

In his opening match, Highfield defeated Barry Pinches 5–2 to qualify for the 2013 Wuxi Classic in China where narrowly lost 5–4 to Mark Williams in the first round. He also qualified for the Indian Open but withdrew from the event before it began. Highfield received automatic entry into both the Welsh Open and UK Championship as all 128 players on the snooker tour began these events in the first round, but he lost on both occasions. His disappointing season saw him finish 83rd in the world rankings and, as Highfield had now been relegated from the main tour, he played in the 2014 Q School to regain his place. Highfield beat Canada's Alex Pagulayan in his final match of the second event to earn a new two-year tour card for the 2014/2015 and 2015/2016 seasons.

=== 2014/2015 season ===
Highfield won four matches to qualify for the 2014 Australian Goldfields Open, but lost 5–2 to Xiao Guodong in the first round. He also made his debut at the International Championship where he was beaten 6–4 by Marco Fu in the first round. Highfield's first win at a ranking event of his career came at the UK Championship when he defeated Jamie Jones 6–3, before losing 6–4 to Mark Davis in the second round. He saw off Fu 5–2 to qualify for the German Masters and was 4–3 ahead of Xiao in the opening round, but lost 5–4 having led 47–0 and 50–0 in the last two frames. Highfield had his best run in a European Tour event this season at the Gdynia Open when he knocked out the likes of Stuart Bingham and Mark Selby to reach the last 16, where Mark Williams beat him 4–2. This helped Highfield finish 38th on the Order of Merit. Highfield's sixth and final appearance at a ranking event this year was the China Open and he lost 5–1 to Ryan Day in the first round.

=== 2015/2016 season ===
Highfield advanced to the final qualifying round for the Shanghai Masters by beating Michael Wild 5–0, Robin Hull 5–2 and Ken Doherty 5–0, but he lost 5–2 to Martin Gould. However, he could only pick up one match win between August until the Gdynia Open in February 2016. There, Highfield defeated Anthony McGill 4–2, Stuart Carrington 4–0 and Robin Hull 4–3 (on the final black after being 3–0 down). He lost in the last 16 4–1 to Gould, but by finishing 65th on the Order of Merit he earned the final two-year tour card on offer to players outside of the top 64 in the world rankings. 10–2 and 10–8 victories over Luke Simmonds and Luca Brecel respectively saw Highfield stand one match away from qualifying for the World Championship. He was 4–0 down to Sam Baird but recovered to be just 5–4 behind and would go on to narrowly lose 10–9.

=== 2016/2017 season ===
By eliminating Luca Brecel 4–2 and Sean Harvey and Ricky Walden both 4–3, Highfield reached the last 16 of a ranking event for the first time at the Paul Hunter Classic, where he lost the final two frames against Mark Davis to be beaten 4–3. Another last 16 appearance came at the UK Championship by defeating Thepchaiya Un-Nooh 6–5, Wang Yuchen 6–5 and Peter Lines 6–2. Highfield had a chance of reaching the quarter-finals when he led Mark Williams 5–4, but lost 6–5. Highfield had a 4–1 win over Tom Ford at the Scottish Open, before losing by a reversal of this scoreline in the second round to Marco Fu.

=== 2018 - present ===
At the 2018 World Championship, Highfield lost 10-5 to Mark Allen in the opening round. The following year, he failed to qualify, beating Hammad Miah 10-7 in the first qualifying round, before losing 10-5 to Zhou Yuelong, although he hit a then-career high of world #46. He reached the first round proper once again in 2020, losing 10-7 to Thepchaiya Un-Nooh, and reached the same stage in both 2021 and 2022, losing 10-4 to Judd Trump and 10-7 to ‍–‍by Anthony McGill respectively, though his world ranking rose to a career-high of #39 before the McGill defeat. In 2023, Highfield broke his wrist in an e-scooter accident, which led to him taking some time off from playing. He returned to the pro tour in 2025, shortly after becoming a father, having won both the 2025 Q School Playoffs and the EBSA European Snooker Championship in Ankara, and stated a desire to win a ranking event before his fortieth birthday. Highfield beat Michał Szubarczyk 5-0 in the Ankara final, but Szubarczyk was awarded a professional tour card anyway, due to Highfield having already qualified with his Q School playoff win. Highfield again qualified for the Crucible in 2026, losing 10-7 in the first round to defending champion Zhao Xintong.

== Performance and rankings timeline ==
Tournament	2010/ 11	2011/ 12	2012/ 13	2013/ 14	2014/ 15	2015/ 16	2016/ 17	2017/ 18	2018/ 19	2019/ 20	2020/ 21	2021/ 22	2022/ 23	2023/ 24	2024/ 25	2025/ 26	2026/ 27
Ranking (Note: It shows the ranking at the beginning of the season)	(Note: New players on the Main Tour don't have a ranking)	68	(Note: Players qualified through the Players Tour Championship Order of Merit started the season without ranking points)	76	(Note: Players qualified through the Q School started the season without prize money ranking points)	74	(Note: Players qualified through the European Tour Order of Merit started the season without ranking points)	68	60	61	63	43	39	55	(Note: He was an amateur)		68
Ranking tournaments
Championship League	Non-Ranking Event										RR	RR	RR	WD	A	RR	RR
China Open	LQ	LQ	LQ	LQ	1R	LQ	LQ	1R	LQ	Tournament Not Held							LQ
Wuhan Open	Tournament Not Held													3R	A	1R	LQ
British Open	Tournament Not Held											3R	LQ	LQ	A	LQ	SF
English Open	Tournament Not Held						3R	3R	1R	2R	2R	LQ	1R	LQ	A	1R	LQ
Shenzhen Open (Note: The event was called the Xi'an Grand Prix (2024/2025–2025/2026))	Tournament Not Held														A	LQ	LQ
Northern Ireland Open	Tournament Not Held						A	4R	2R	1R	1R	2R	LQ	LQ	A	LQ	1R
International Championship	Not Held		LQ	LQ	1R	LQ	LQ	LQ	1R	1R	Not Held			LQ	A	2R	1R
UK Championship	LQ	LQ	LQ	1R	2R	1R	4R	2R	2R	2R	2R	3R	1R	LQ	A	LQ	
Shoot Out	Non-Ranking Event						3R	2R	1R	2R	3R	3R	QF	1R	A	4R	
Scottish Open	Not Held		MR	Not Held			2R	2R	1R	3R	3R	LQ	1R	1R	A	LQ	LQ
German Masters	LQ	LQ	LQ	LQ	1R	LQ	LQ	LQ	LQ	LQ	LQ	1R	LQ	LQ	A	LQ	
Welsh Open	LQ	LQ	LQ	1R	2R	1R	1R	4R	1R	2R	2R	2R	LQ	LQ	A	1R	
World Grand Prix	Tournament Not Held				NR	DNQ	DNQ	DNQ	DNQ	DNQ	DNQ	DNQ	DNQ	DNQ	DNQ	DNQ	
Players Championship (Note: The event was called the Players Tour Championship Grand Final (2010/2011–2015/2016))	DNQ	DNQ	DNQ	DNQ	DNQ	DNQ	DNQ	DNQ	DNQ	DNQ	DNQ	DNQ	DNQ	DNQ	DNQ	DNQ	
World Open	LQ	LQ	LQ	LQ	Not Held		LQ	LQ	LQ	WD	Not Held			LQ	A	LQ	
Tour Championship	Tournament Not Held								DNQ	DNQ	DNQ	DNQ	DNQ	DNQ	DNQ	DNQ	
World Championship	LQ	LQ	LQ	LQ	LQ	LQ	LQ	1R	LQ	LQ	1R	1R	LQ	LQ	LQ	1R	
Non-ranking tournaments
Championship League	A	A	A	A	A	A	A	A	A	RR	A	A	A	A	A	A	
Former ranking tournaments
Wuxi Classic	Non-Ranking		LQ	1R	LQ	Tournament Not Held											
Australian Goldfields Open	NH	LQ	LQ	LQ	1R	LQ	Tournament Not Held										
Shanghai Masters	LQ	LQ	LQ	LQ	LQ	LQ	LQ	LQ	Non-Ranking		Not Held			Non-Ranking Event			
Paul Hunter Classic	Minor-Ranking Event						4R	2R	3R	NR	Tournament Not Held						
Indian Open	Not Held			WD	LQ	NH	1R	QF	1R	Tournament Not Held							
Riga Masters (Note: The event was called the Riga Open (2014/2015–2015/2016))	Tournament Not Held				Minor-Ranking		LQ	WD	1R	2R	Tournament Not Held						
China Championship	Tournament Not Held						NR	WD	1R	1R	Tournament Not Held						
WST Pro Series	Tournament Not Held										RR	Tournament Not Held					
Turkish Masters	Tournament Not Held											LQ	Tournament Not Held				
Gibraltar Open	Tournament Not Held					MR	1R	1R	3R	1R	1R	WD	Tournament Not Held				
WST Classic	Tournament Not Held												2R	Tournament Not Held			
European Masters	Tournament Not Held						A	LQ	1R	LQ	3R	1R	LQ	A	Not Held		
Saudi Arabia Masters	Tournament Not Held														A	2R	NH
Former non-ranking tournaments
Shoot Out	A	A	A	2R	A	1R	Ranking Event										
Six-red World Championship	A	NH	A	A	A	A	A	A	A	A	Not Held		LQ	Tournament Not Held			

Performance Table Legend
LQ	lost in the qualifying draw	#R	lost in the early rounds of the tournament (WR = Wildcard round, RR = Round robin)	QF	lost in the quarter-finals
SF	lost in the semi-finals	F	lost in the final	W	won the tournament
DNQ	did not qualify for the tournament	A	did not participate in the tournament	WD	withdrew from the tournament

NH / Not Held	means an event was not held.
NR / Non-Ranking Event	means an event is/was no longer a ranking event.
R / Ranking Event	means an event is/was a ranking event.
MR / Minor-Ranking Event	means an event is/was a minor-ranking event.

== Career finals ==
=== Amateur finals: 7 (5 titles) ===
Outcome	No.	Year	Championship	Opponent in the final	Score
Winner	1.	2008	PIOS – Event 8	(England) Justin Astley	6–2
Winner	2.	2009	English Under-19 Championship	(England) Stuart Carrington	8–3
Runner-up	1.	2009	PIOS – Event 1	(England) Jack Lisowski	5–6
Winner	3.	2009	PIOS – Event 2	(England) Neal Jones	6–2
Runner-up	2.	2010	PIOS – Event 6	(England) Kyren Wilson	4–6
Winner	4.	2025	Q Tour – Event 7	(Wales) Dylan Emery	4–3
Winner	5.	2025	EBSA European Snooker Championship	(Poland) Michał Szubarczyk	5–0
