= Michael Leslie (snooker player) =

Scottish snooker player (born 1993)

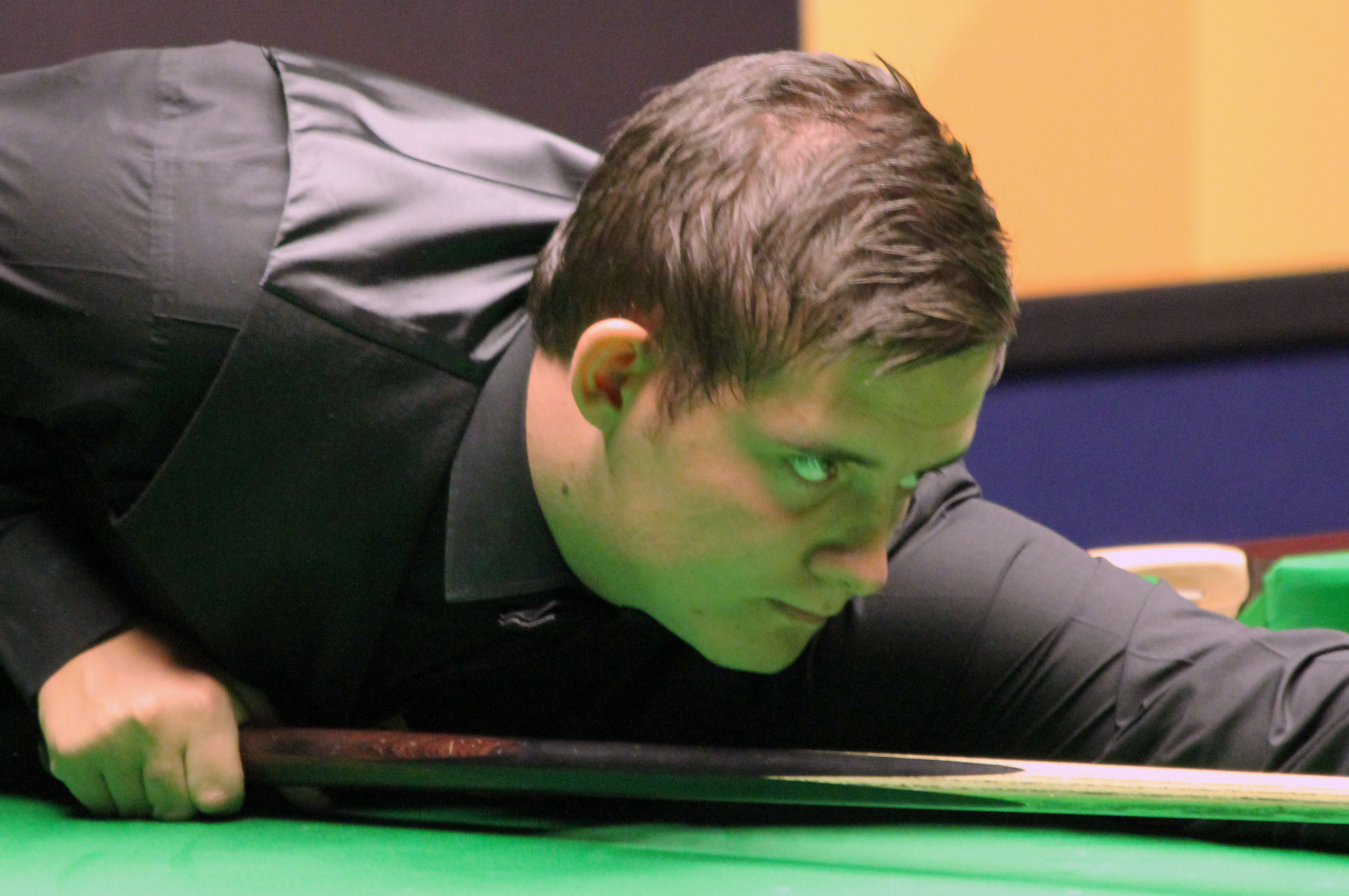
- Paul Hunter Classic 2012

Personal information
- Born: 28 January 1993 (age 33) Bonnyrigg, Scotland

Sport
- Country: Scotland
- Sport: Snooker
- Professional: 2012–2016
- Highest ranking: 82 (July 2015)
- Best ranking finish: Last 32 (x1)

Michael Leslie (born 28 January 1993) is a Scottish former professional snooker player.

Leslie turned professional in 2012 after winning the 2012 EBSA European Under-21 Snooker Championships and gained a two-year tour card for the 2012–13 and 2013–14 snooker seasons.

== Career ==
=== Debut season ===
Leslie lost his first sixteen matches as a professional, picking up his first and only victory in the first round of World Open Qualifying by beating Michael Wasley 5–3, before losing 1–5 to Thepchaiya Un-Nooh. Leslie's season ended when he was beaten 4–10 by Dechawat Poomjaeng in the first round of World Championship Qualifying. He finished his first year on tour ranked world number 94.

=== 2013/2014 season ===
Leslie could not win more than one match in any event during the 2013–14 season. He did reach the second round of a ranking event for the first time in his career at the UK Championship by coming back from 4–0 down against Jack Lisowski to win 6–4, a performance he described as the best of his career so far, but he then lost 6–3 against Liang Wenbo in the next round. Leslie was beaten 10–6 by amateur player Christopher Keogan in the opening round of World Championship qualifying. He was relegated from the main tour as he ended the season ranked world number 101, well outside of the top 64 who remain. Leslie played in the 2014 Q School to try and win his spot back and succeeded in the second event by defeating Eden Sharav in his final match to earn a new two-year tour card for the 2014–15 and 2015–16 seasons.

=== 2014/2015 season ===
In the qualifying rounds of the 2014 Australian Goldfields Open, Leslie beat Hammad Miah 5–4 and Sam Baird 5–3 to play in the final round, but was narrowly eliminated 5–4 by Marcus Campbell. Later in the season after losing eight matches in a row, Leslie recorded the result of his career to date by defeating Mark Allen, a player ranked 106 places above him in the rankings, 5–1 to qualify for the China Open. There, he reached the last 32 of a ranking event for the first time with a 5–1 victory over Joe O'Connor, but was thrashed 5–0 by Mark Williams.

=== 2015/2016 season ===
A disappointing season saw Leslie fail to qualify for any ranking event other than the UK Championship and Welsh Open, for which he gained automatic entry and he failed to pick up a frame in either of those as he lost in the first round to Gerard Greene and Judd Trump. He finished the season 94th in the world rankings and therefore fell off the snooker tour.

== Performance and rankings timeline ==
Tournament	2011/ 12	2012/ 13	2013/ 14	2014/ 15	2015/ 16
Ranking (Note: It shows the ranking at the beginning of the season.)	(Note: He was an amateur.)	(Note: New players on the Main Tour don't have a ranking.)	94	(Note: Players qualified through Q School started the season without prize money ranking points.)	105
Ranking tournaments
Australian Goldfields Open	A	LQ	LQ	LQ	LQ
Shanghai Masters	A	LQ	LQ	LQ	LQ
International Championship	NH	LQ	1R	LQ	LQ
UK Championship	A	LQ	2R	1R	1R
German Masters	A	LQ	LQ	LQ	A
Welsh Open	A	LQ	1R	1R	1R
Indian Open	Not Held		LQ	LQ	NH
Players Championship Grand Final (Note: The event was called the Players Tour Championship Grand Finals (2011/2012–2012/2013))	DNQ	DNQ	DNQ	DNQ	DNQ
China Open	A	LQ	LQ	2R	LQ
World Championship	A	LQ	LQ	LQ	LQ
Former ranking tournaments
World Open	A	LQ	LQ	Not held	
Wuxi Classic	NR	LQ	LQ	LQ	NH

Performance Table Legend
LQ	lost in the qualifying draw	#R	lost in the early rounds of the tournament (WR = Wildcard round, RR = Round robin)	QF	lost in the quarter-finals
SF	lost in the semi-finals	F	lost in the final	W	won the tournament
DNQ	did not qualify for the tournament	A	did not participate in the tournament	WD	withdrew from the tournament

NH / Not Held	means an event was not held.
NR / Non-Ranking Event	means an event is/was no longer a ranking event.
R / Ranking Event	means an event is/was a ranking event.
MR / Minor-Ranking Event	means an event is/was a minor-ranking event.

== Career finals ==
=== Pro-am finals: 1 ===
Outcome	No.	Year	Championship	Opponent in the final	Score
Runner-up	1.	2015	PMK Invitational Pro-Am	(Scotland) Anthony McGill	3–4

=== Amateur finals: 2 (1 title) ===
Outcome	No.	Year	Championship	Opponent in the final	Score
Runner-up	1.	2011	EBSA European Under-21 Snooker Championships	(Poland) Kacper Filipiak	3–6
Winner	1.	2012	EBSA European Under-21 Snooker Championships	(England) Shane Castle	6–2
