= Players Tour Championship 2015/2016 =

The Players Tour Championship 2015/2016 was a series of snooker tournaments which started on 29 July 2015 and ended on 27 March 2016, with events held across Europe and Asia. In this season the European events form the European Tour and events held in Asia the Asian Tour. This season there were seven regular minor-ranking events down from nine the previous season concluding with the finals which held full Ranking event status.

== Schedule ==
Date (Note: Dates use the month day format)			Tournament Name	Venue	City	Winner	Runner–up	Score	References
07–29	08–02	LAT	European Tour – Event 1 (Note: Event also known as the 2015 Riga Open.)	Arena Riga	Riga	(England) Barry Hawkins	(England) Tom Ford	4–1	
08–26	08–30	GER	European Tour – Event 2 (Note: Event also known as the 2015 Paul Hunter Classic.)	Stadthalle	Fürth	(England) Ali Carter	(England) Shaun Murphy	4–3	
10–07	10–11	GER	European Tour – Event 3 (Note: Event also known as the 2015 Ruhr Open.)	RWE-Sporthalle	Mülheim	(England) Rory McLeod	(China) Tian Pengfei	4–2	
10–19	10–23	CHN	Asian Tour – Event 1 (Note: Event also known as the 2015 Haining Open.)	Haining Sports Center	Haining	(China) Ding Junhui	(England) Ricky Walden	4–3	
11–04	11–08	BUL	European Tour – Event 4 (Note: Event also known as the 2015 Bulgarian Open.)	Universiada Hall	Sofia	(Northern Ireland) Mark Allen	(Wales) Ryan Day	4–0	
12–09	12–13	GIB	European Tour – Event 5 (Note: Event also known as the 2015 Gibraltar Open.)	Tercentenary Sports Hall	Gibraltar	(Hong Kong) Marco Fu	(Wales) Michael White	4–1	
02–23	02–28	POL	European Tour – Event 6 (Note: Event also known as the 2015 Gdynia Open.)	Gdynia Sports Arena	Gdynia	(England) Mark Selby	(England) Martin Gould	4–1	
03–22	03–27	ENG	Players Championship Finals	EventCity	Manchester	(Northern Ireland) Mark Allen	(England) Ricky Walden	10–6	

== Order of Merit ==
The prize money collected at each PTC tournament is summed up to obtain the European and Asian Tour Order of Merit. The top 24 from the European Tour Order of Merit, the top 2 from the Asian Tour Order of Merit plus six more from a combination of both lists will qualify for the PTC finals in Manchester.

=== European Tour ===
After 6 out of 6 events:

Rank	Player	Total Points	Events Played
1	(England) Mark Selby	26,625	6
2	(England) Barry Hawkins	25,275	4
3	(Hong Kong) Marco Fu	23,175	4
4	(Northern Ireland) Mark Allen	22,200	4
5	(England) Rory McLeod	22,200	6
6	(England) Ali Carter	20,550	3
7	(England) Shaun Murphy	15,975	6
8	(Wales) Ryan Day	14,475	6
9	(England) Mark King	13,200	6
10	(Wales) Michael White	13,200	6
11	(England) Tom Ford	13,050	6
12	(Wales) Mark Williams	12,225	6
13	(China) Tian Pengfei	11,700	5
14	(England) Martin Gould	10,425	4
15	(England) Andrew Higginson	10,275	6
16	(England) Mike Dunn	9,975	6
17	(England) Kyren Wilson	9,900	6
18	(England) Ben Woollaston	9,750	6
19	(England) Michael Holt	8,700	6
20	(China) Liang Wenbo	8,550	6
21	(England) Judd Trump	8,250	6
22	(Wales) Dominic Dale	8,025	6
23	(Scotland) Alan McManus	7,950	6
24	(England) David Gilbert	7,350	6

=== Asian Tour ===
After 1 out of 1 events:

Rank	Player	Total Points	Events Played
1	(China) Ding Junhui	13,500	1
2	(England) Ricky Walden	6,500	1

=== Both ===
After 7 out of 7 events:

Rank	Player	Total Points	Events Played
1	(England) Jimmy Robertson	8,000	7
2	(England) Sam Baird	7,275	6
3	(Belgium) Luca Brecel	6,675	6
4	(Scotland) Graeme Dott	6,450	5
5	(England) Robert Milkins	6,200	7
6	(England) Mark Davis	6,150	5

(Top 6 players of all 7 PTC events who haven't already qualified)
