= Bulgarian Open =

Snooker tournament

Tournament information
- Venue: Universiada Hall
- Location: Sofia
- Country: Bulgaria
- Established: 2012
- Organisation(s): World Professional Billiards and Snooker Association
- Format: Minor-ranking event
- Total prize fund: €125,000
- Final year: 2015
- Final champion: (Northern Ireland) Mark Allen

The Bulgarian Open (also known as the Victoria Bulgarian Open for sponsorship reasons) was a pro–am minor-ranking snooker tournament, which was part of the Players Tour Championship. The tournament started in 2012 and was staged at the Princess Hotel in Sofia, Bulgaria, and then moved to the Universiada Hall in 2013.

== Winners ==
Year	Winner	Runner-up	Final score	Season
2012	(England) Judd Trump	(Scotland) John Higgins	4–0	2012/13
2013	(Scotland) John Higgins	(Australia) Neil Robertson	4–1	2013/14
2014	(England) Shaun Murphy	(England) Martin Gould	4–2	2014/15
2015	(Northern Ireland) Mark Allen	(Wales) Ryan Day	4–0	2015/16
