= Sam Baird =

English snooker player (born 1988)

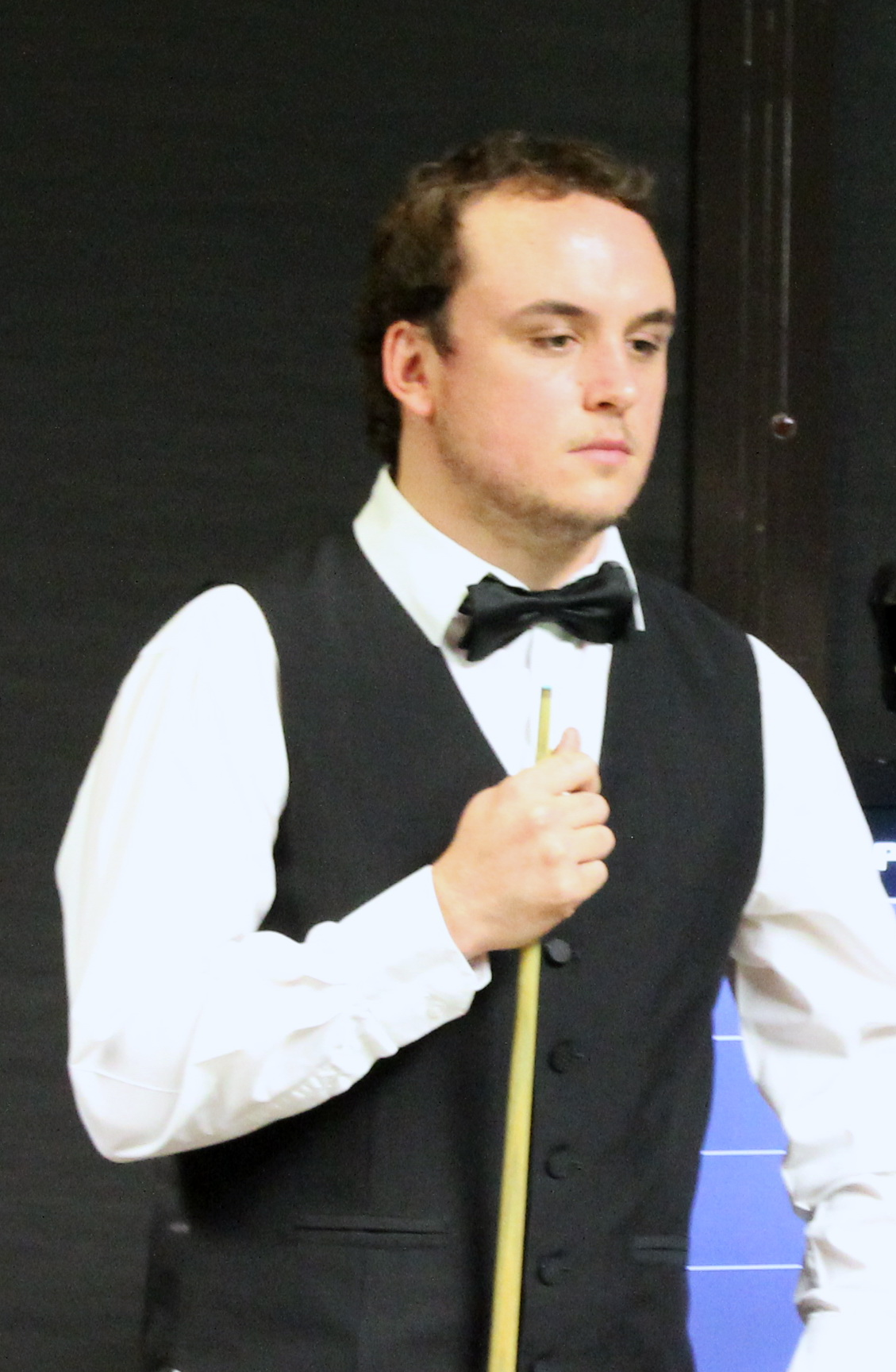
- Baird at the 2016 Paul Hunter Classic

Personal information
- Nickname: The Blade
- Born: 17 June 1988 (age 38) Uffculme, England

Sport
- Country: England
- Sport: Snooker
- Professional: 2009/2010, 2011–2020
- Highest ranking: 43 (July 2016)
- Best ranking finish: Quarter-final (x2)

Sam Baird (born 17 June 1988) is an English former professional snooker player. He first entered the professional tour for the 2009/10 season, by winning the EBSA Pro-Ticket Tour Play-offs.

== Career ==
=== 2011/2012 season ===
Baird reached the main draw of a ranking event for the first time in 2012 by coming through four qualifying matches, concluding with a 4–2 win over Dominic Dale, to make the 2012 Welsh Open. He played against world number 1, Mark Selby in the first round of the event and almost pulled off the result of his career as he led the best-of-seven match, 3–2. Baird then missed a blue off the spot with two balls remaining when he required just the blue and pink for the match and, despite chances in the decider, he would lose the game 3–4.

Baird also qualified for the 2012 World Open in Haikou, China. He again won four matches, sealing his place with a 5–4 victory over Mark Davis. He was required to play in a wild-card round in China to make the last 32 of the event and was beaten 3–5 by Jin Long.

Baird failed to win a match in qualifying for the final three ranking events and finished the season ranked world number 76, out of the top 64 who retain their places on the tour. Baird therefore entered the 2012 Q School in a bid to play in the 2012/2013 season and succeeded at his first attempt by winning each of his five matches 4–0 to gain a two-year spot on the main tour.

=== 2012/2013 season ===
Baird produced his best snooker towards the end of the 2012/2013 season as he beat Luca Brecel and Martin Gould to reach the main draw of the Welsh Open for the second successive year. He whitewashed Gerard Greene 4–0 in the first round, before losing 2–4 to Robert Milkins. In qualifying for the World Championship, Baird defeated Chen Zhe 10–7, Peter Lines 10–9 and Rory McLeod 10–9 to find himself just one match away from playing in the biggest tournament on the snooker calendar. He faced world number 20, Joe Perry, but it was world number 83, Baird who played by far the better as he won 10–3 and in the 12th frame made a break of 142, the highest of the whole qualifying tournament. Baird played Stuart Bingham in the first round, losing 2–10 to finish the year ranked world number 81.

=== 2013/2014 season ===
Baird had a very successful year in European Tour events as he reached at least the last 16 stage in five of the eight events. At the Kay Suzanne Memorial Cup he won through to the quarter-finals where he lost 4–1 to Ben Woollaston and he went one better at the Gdynia Open, losing 4–1 against Fergal O'Brien in the semifinals. This helped Baird finish 11th on the Order of Merit to qualify for the Finals for the first time. He faced Anthony Hamilton in the opening round and was edged out 4–3. Baird's only win in a full ranking event match this season came at the Welsh Open by beating Robbie Williams 4–2 before being defeated 4–3 by reigning champion, Stephen Maguire, having led 3–1. Baird ended the year ranked world number 67, just outside the top 64 who keep their playing rights for the coming season. However, his impressive displays on the European Tour handed him the first of eight spots available to non-qualified players for a new two-year place on the tour.

=== 2014/2015 season ===
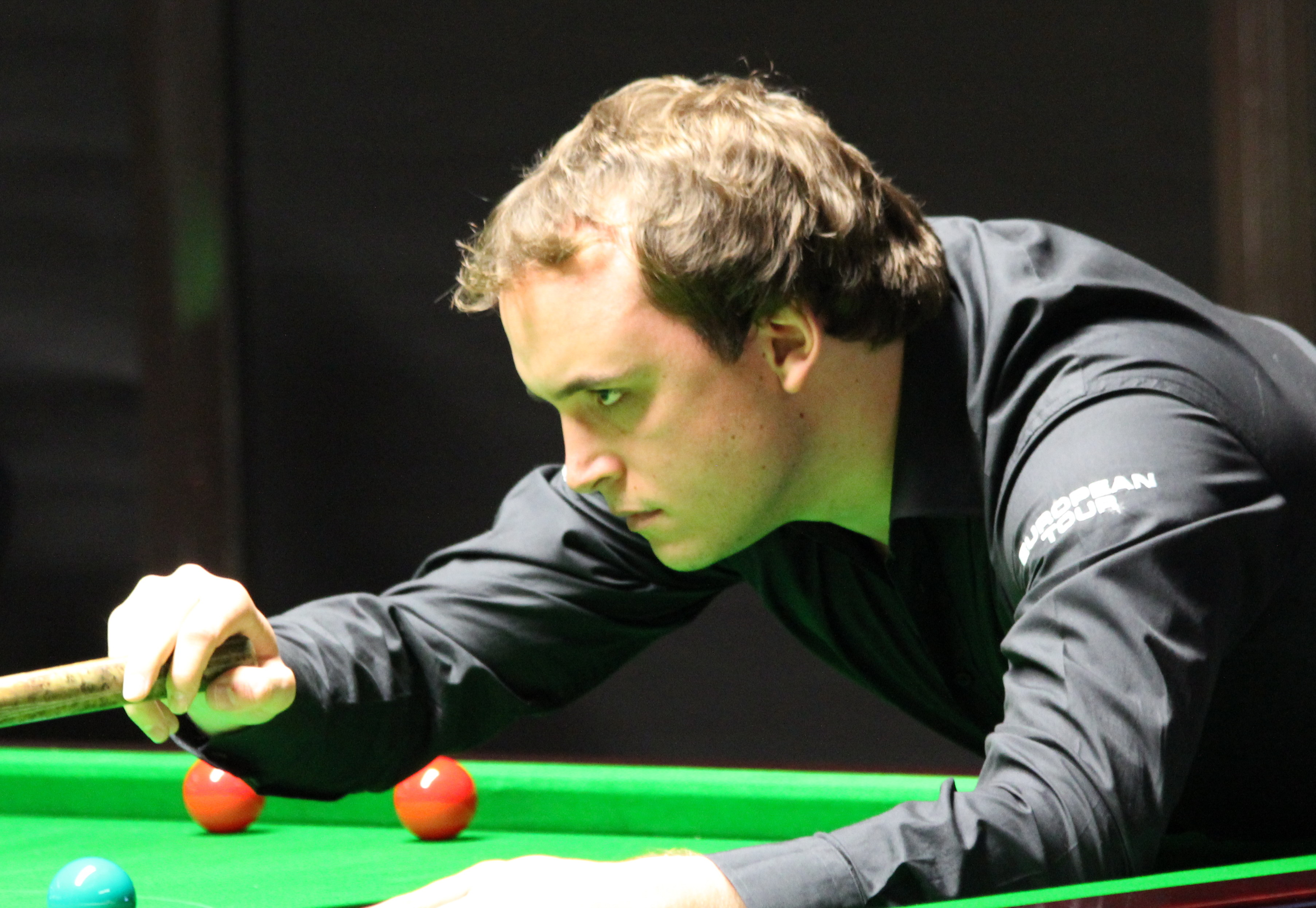
Baird at 2014 Paul Hunter Classic

Baird's five appearances at ranking events this season represents the most he has ever played in during a single season. At the 2014 Wuxi Classic he defeated Fraser Patrick 5–3, but lost 5–2 to Michael Holt in the second round. Baird gained some revenge over Holt by beating him to qualify for the International Championship and then saw off Kyren Wilson 6–2 and Mark Davis 6–5 to reach the last 16 of a ranking event for the second time in his career. Baird built up a 4–3 and a 61–0 points lead, but Mark Williams made a 71 break to level and won the last two frames to progress. At the Welsh Open, he overcame Fergal O'Brien 4–3 and Dave Harold 4–0, before losing 4–2 to Stephen Maguire and he was knocked out in the first round of the Indian Open following a 4–0 defeat against Rod Lawler. In the second round of World Championship qualifying, Baird missed the final pink when on a 147 against Adam Duffy and his season would end in a 10–7 loss.

=== 2015/2016 season ===
A poor start to the season was halted when Baird overcame Rory McLeod, Zhang Anda and Chris Melling all without dropping a frame at the Bulgarian Open, and then beat Jimmy Robertson 4–3 and Judd Trump 4–1 to make the semi-finals of an event for the second time. He was defeated 4–2 by Ryan Day. He lost 4–0 to John Higgins in the second round of the Welsh Open, but a further last 16 showing to add to his semi-final in the European Tour events saw him placed 25th on the Order of Merit to qualify for the Grand Final, but he lost 4–2 to Mark King in the first round. He qualified for the China Open and went 2–0 up on Stuart Bingham before conceding 547 points without reply, a record in ranking events, and went on to lose 5–3. Baird qualified for the televised stages of the World Championship for the second time, and first for three years, courtesy of wins over Thor Chuan Leong, Tom Ford, and Liam Highfield. In the first round, Baird earned his first victory at the Crucible by defeating seeded player Michael White 10–7, making two century breaks in the process. He won four successive frames to level at 11–11 in the second round against Mark Selby, but Selby recovered to eliminate Baird 13–11. Baird finished the year 46th in the world ranking, his highest position to date.

=== 2016/2017 season ===
Baird got to the last 16 of a ranking event for fourth time by seeing off Daniel Ward 4–2, Gary Wilson 4–1 and Liang Wenbo 4–2 at the Paul Hunter Classic. He was unable to make it to his first quarter-final as Mark Selby defeated him 4–2. He soon reached the last 16 stage again as he beat Michael White 6–2 and Marco Fu 6–4 at the International Championship, but he lost 6–1 against Shaun Murphy. He won a match at the UK Championship for the first time by eliminating Sean O'Sullivan 6–2 and then lost by a reversal of this scoreline to Mitchell Mann. Baird had a 4–2 victory over John Higgins in the first round of the Welsh Open, before losing 4–1 to Craig Steadman.

He dropped off the tour at the end of the 2017/18 season but entered 2018 Q School in an attempt to win back a place, and secured his return to the tour at the first event.

== Performance and rankings timeline ==
Tournament	2009/ 10	2010/ 11	2011/ 12	2012/ 13	2013/ 14	2014/ 15	2015/ 16	2016/ 17	2017/ 18	2018/ 19	2019/ 20
Ranking (Note: From the 2010/2011 season it shows the ranking at the beginning of the season.)	(Note: New players on the Main Tour don't have a ranking)	(Note: He was an amateur)		(Note: Players qualified through Q School started the season without ranking points)	81	(Note: Players qualified through European Tour Order of Merit started the season without prize money ranking points)	72	46	51		71
Ranking tournaments
Riga Masters	Tournament Not Held					Minor-Ranking		1R	3R	LQ	LQ
International Championship	Tournament Not Held			LQ	LQ	3R	LQ	3R	LQ	1R	LQ
China Championship	Tournament Not Held							NR	1R	LQ	1R
English Open	Tournament Not Held							1R	1R	2R	1R
World Open (Note: The event was called the Grand Prix (2009/2010))	LQ	LQ	WR	LQ	LQ	Not Held		LQ	LQ	LQ	LQ
Northern Ireland Open	Tournament Not Held							3R	1R	2R	2R
UK Championship	LQ	A	LQ	LQ	1R	1R	1R	2R	1R	2R	1R
Scottish Open	Tournament Not Held			MR	Tournament Not Held			1R	1R	QF	1R
European Masters	Tournament Not Held							LQ	1R	LQ	LQ
German Masters	NH	A	LQ	LQ	LQ	LQ	LQ	LQ	LQ	1R	LQ
World Grand Prix	Tournament Not Held					NR	DNQ	DNQ	DNQ	DNQ	DNQ
Welsh Open	LQ	A	1R	2R	2R	3R	2R	2R	1R	1R	1R
Shoot-Out	NH	Non-Ranking Event						1R	1R	QF	1R
Players Championship (Note: The event was called the Players Tour Championship Grand Finals (2010/2011–2012/2013) and the Players Championship Grand Final (2013/2014–2015/2016))	NH	DNQ	DNQ	DNQ	1R	DNQ	1R	DNQ	DNQ	DNQ	DNQ
Gibraltar Open	Tournament Not Held						MR	1R	1R	1R	1R
Tour Championship	Tournament Not Held									DNQ	DNQ
World Championship	LQ	LQ	LQ	1R	LQ	LQ	2R	LQ	LQ	LQ	LQ
Non-ranking tournaments
The Masters	LQ	A	A	A	A	A	A	A	A	A	A
Championship League	A	A	A	A	A	A	A	A	A	A	RR
Former ranking tournaments
Wuxi Classic (Note: The event was called the Jiangsu Classic (2009/2010))	Non-Ranking Event			LQ	LQ	2R	Tournament Not Held				
Australian Goldfields Open	Not Held		LQ	LQ	LQ	LQ	LQ	Tournament Not Held			
Shanghai Masters	LQ	A	LQ	LQ	LQ	LQ	LQ	LQ	LQ	Non-Ranking	
Paul Hunter Classic (Note: The event was called the Grand Prix Fürth (2004/2005) and the Fürth German Open (2005/2006–2006/2007))	PA	Minor-Ranking Event						4R	2R	3R	NR
Indian Open	Tournament Not Held				LQ	1R	NH	2R	2R	1R	NH
China Open	LQ	A	LQ	LQ	WR	LQ	1R	LQ	1R	1R	NH
Former non-ranking tournaments
Shoot-Out	NH	A	A	A	A	3R	1R	Ranking Event			

Performance Table Legend
LQ	lost in the qualifying draw	#R	lost in the early rounds of the tournament (WR = Wildcard round, RR = Round robin)	QF	lost in the quarter-finals
SF	lost in the semi–finals	F	lost in the final	W	won the tournament
DNQ	did not qualify for the tournament	A	did not participate in the tournament	WD	withdrew from the tournament

NH / Not Held	means an event was not held.
NR / Non-Ranking Event	means an event is/was no longer a ranking event.
R / Ranking Event	means an event is/was a ranking event.
MR / Minor-Ranking Event	means an event is/was a minor-ranking event.
PA / Pro-am Event	means an event is/was a pro-am event.
