= 2015–16 snooker season =

Series of snooker tournaments

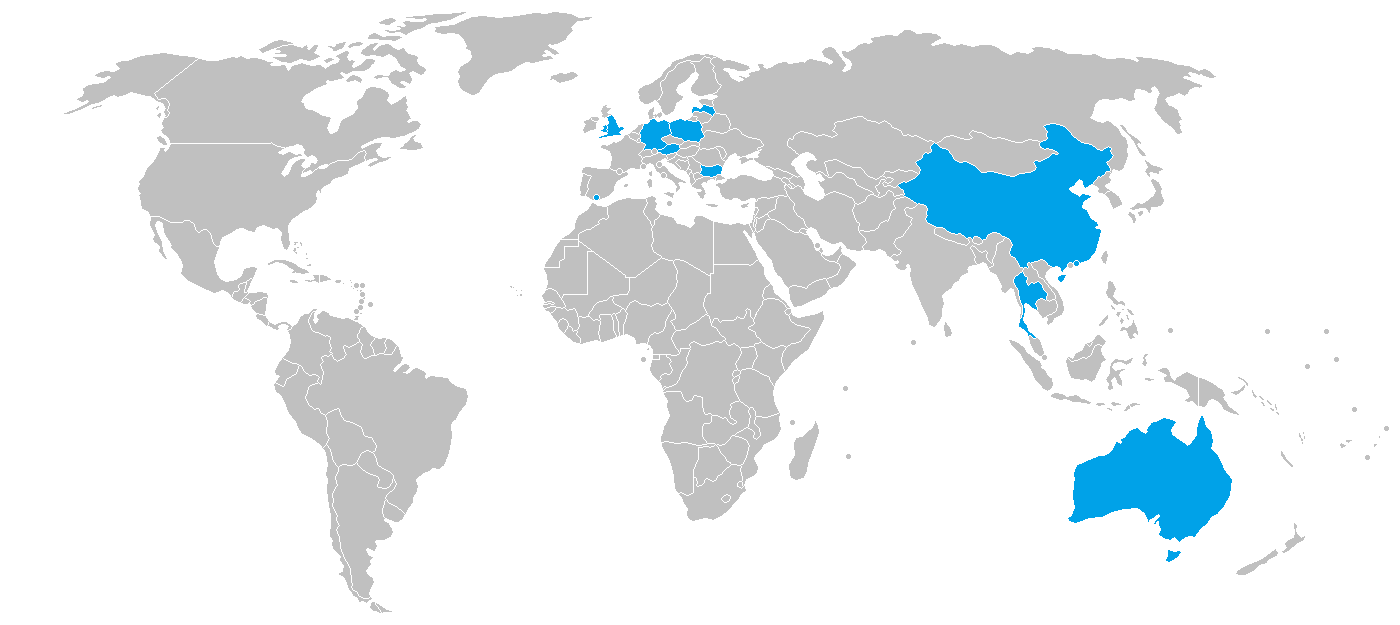
- Nations that hosted an event in the snooker calendar during the 2015–16 season

Details
- Duration: 7 May 2015 – 2 May 2016
- Tournaments: 28 (10 ranking events)

Triple Crown winners
- UK Championship: Neil Robertson (AUS)
- Masters: Ronnie O'Sullivan (ENG)
- World Championship: Mark Selby (ENG)

The 2015–16 snooker season was a series of snooker tournaments played between 7 May 2015 and 2 May 2016.

The World Grand Prix became a ranking event featuring the top 32 players on a one-year money list, having been a non-ranking event the previous season.

== New professional players ==
Countries:

- Australia
- Brazil
- China
- Egypt
- England
- Iran
- Isle of Man
- Pakistan
- Scotland
- Thailand
- Wales

The top 64 players from the prize money rankings after the 2015 World Championship, and the 30 players earning a two-year card the previous year automatically qualified for the season. The top eight players from the European Tour Order of Merit and top four players from the Asian Tour Order of Merit, who had not already qualified for the Main Tour, also qualified. Another two players came from the EBSA Qualifying Tour Play-Offs, and a further eight places were available through the 2015 Q School. The rest of the places on to the tour came from amateur events and national governing body nominations. Hossein Vafaei's two-year tour card will commence this season. (Note: Hossein Vafaei received special dispensation to play on the Main Tour last season, while awaiting a visa, which he received in February 2015.) All players listed below received a tour card for two seasons.

International champions:
- IBSF World Snooker Championship winner: Yan Bingtao (CHN) (Note: Tour card deferred by World Snooker to the start of the 2016/17 season.)

1. IBSF World Under-21 Snooker Championship winner: Hossein Vafaei (IRN)
2. EBSA European Snooker Championships winner: Michael Wild (ENG)
3. EBSA European Under-21 Snooker Championships winner: Darryl Hill (IOM)
4. ACBS Asian Snooker Championship winner: Hamza Akbar (PAK)
5. ACBS Asian Under-21 Snooker Championship winner: Sunny Akani (THA)
6. Pan-American Championship winner: Itaro Santos (BRA)
7. ABSF African Championships winner: Hatem Yassen (EGY)
8. Oceania Championship winner: Vinnie Calabrese (AUS)

European Tour Order of Merit

9. Chris Wakelin (ENG)
10. Fraser Patrick (SCO)
11. Noppon Saengkham (THA)
12. Jamie Cope (ENG)
13. Jimmy White (ENG)
14. Allan Taylor (ENG)
15. Nigel Bond (ENG)
16. James Cahill (ENG)

EBSA Qualifying Tour Play-Offs

17. Sanderson Lam (ENG)
18. Martin O'Donnell (ENG)

Asian Tour Order of Merit

19. Ross Muir (SCO)
20. Sean O'Sullivan (ENG)
21. Zhang Yong (CHN)
22. Alfie Burden (ENG)

Q School

Main article: 2015 Q School

Event 1

23. Sydney Wilson (ENG)
24. Daniel Wells (WAL)
25. Eden Sharav (SCO)
26. Rhys Clark (SCO)

Event 2

27. Jason Weston (ENG)
28. Gareth Allen (WAL)
29. Duane Jones (WAL)
30. Paul Davison (ENG)

International Development Main Tour Card

31. Igor Figueiredo (BRA)

== Calendar ==
The following tables outline the dates and results of all World Snooker Tour, World Ladies Billiards and Snooker, seniors, and other events.

=== World Snooker Tour ===
Start	Finish	Tournament	Venue	Winner	Score	Runner-up	Ref.
15 Jun	21 Jun	World Cup†	Wuxi City Sports Park Stadium in Wuxi, China	China B	4‍–‍1	Scotland	
29 Jun	5 Jul	Australian Goldfields Open	Bendigo Stadium in Bendigo, Australia	John Higgins (SCO)	9‍–‍8	Martin Gould (ENG)	
29 Jul	2 Aug	European Tour – Event 1 (Note: Event also known as the 2015 Riga Open.)‡	Arena Riga in Riga, Latvia	Barry Hawkins (ENG)	4‍–‍1	Tom Ford (ENG)	
26 Aug	30 Aug	European Tour – Event 2 (Note: Event also known as the 2015 Paul Hunter Classic.)‡	Stadhalle in Fürth, Germany	Ali Carter (ENG)	4‍–‍3	Shaun Murphy (ENG)	
7 Sep	12 Sep	Six-red World Championship†	Fashion Island Shopping Mall in Bangkok, Thailand	Thepchaiya Un-Nooh (THA)	8‍–‍2	Liang Wenbo (CHN)	
14 Sep	20 Sep	Shanghai Masters	Shanghai Grand Stage in Shanghai, China	Kyren Wilson (ENG)	10‍–‍9	Judd Trump (ENG)	
7 Oct	11 Oct	European Tour – Event 3 (Note: Event also known as the 2015 Ruhr Open.)‡	RWE-Sporthalle in Mülheim, Germany	Rory McLeod (ENG)	4‍–‍2	Tian Pengfei (CHN)	
19 Oct	23 Oct	Asian Tour – Event 1 (Note: Event also known as the 2015 Haining Open.)‡	Haining Sports Center in Haining, China	Ding Junhui (CHN)	4‍–‍3	Ricky Walden (ENG)	
25 Oct	1 Nov	International Championship	Baihu Media Broadcasting Centre in Daqing, China	John Higgins (SCO)	10‍–‍5	David Gilbert (ENG)	
4 Nov	8 Nov	European Tour – Event 4 (Note: Event also known as the 2015 Bulgarian Open.)‡	Universiada Hall in Sofia, Bulgaria	Mark Allen (NIR)	4‍–‍0	Ryan Day (WAL)	
10 Nov	15 Nov	Champion of Champions†	Ricoh Arena in Coventry, England	Neil Robertson (AUS)	10‍–‍5	Mark Allen (NIR)	
24 Nov	6 Dec	UK Championship	Barbican Centre in York, England	Neil Robertson (AUS)	10‍–‍5	Liang Wenbo (CHN)	
9 Dec	13 Dec	European Tour – Event 5 (Note: Event also known as the 2015 Gibraltar Open.)‡	Tercentenary Sports Hall, Victoria Stadium in Gibraltar, Gibraltar	Marco Fu (HKG)	4‍–‍1	Michael White (WAL)	
10 Jan	17 Jan	Masters†	Alexandra Palace in London, England	Ronnie O'Sullivan (ENG)	10‍–‍1	Barry Hawkins (ENG)	
3 Feb	7 Feb	German Masters	Tempodrom in Berlin, Germany	Martin Gould (ENG)	9‍–‍5	Luca Brecel (BEL)	
12 Feb	14 Feb	Shoot Out†	Hexagon Theatre in Reading, England	Robin Hull (FIN)	1‍–‍0	Luca Brecel (BEL)	
15 Feb	21 Feb	Welsh Open	Motorpoint Arena in Cardiff, Wales	Ronnie O'Sullivan (ENG)	9‍–‍5	Neil Robertson (AUS)	
23 Feb	28 Feb	European Tour – Event 6 (Note: Event also known as the 2016 Gdynia Open.)‡	Gdynia Sports Arena in Gdynia, Poland	Mark Selby (ENG)	4‍–‍1	Martin Gould (ENG)	
4 Jan	3 Mar	Championship League†	Crondon Park Golf Club in Stock, England	Judd Trump (ENG)	3‍–‍2	Ronnie O'Sullivan (ENG)	
8 Mar	13 Mar	World Grand Prix	Venue Cymru in Llandudno, Wales	Shaun Murphy (ENG)	10‍–‍9	Stuart Bingham (ENG)	
22 Mar	27 Mar	Players Tour Championship Finals	EventCity in Manchester, England	Mark Allen (NIR)	10‍–‍6	Ricky Walden (ENG)	
28 Mar	3 Apr	China Open	Beijing University Students' Gymnasium in Beijing, China	Judd Trump (ENG)	10‍–‍4	Ricky Walden (ENG)	
16 Apr	2 May	World Championship	Crucible Theatre in Sheffield, England	Mark Selby (ENG)	18‍–‍14	Ding Junhui (CHN)	

Ranking event
‡ Minor-ranking event
† Non-ranking event

=== World Ladies Billiards and Snooker ===
Start	Finish	Tournament	Venue	Winner	Score	Runner-up	Ref.
26 Sep	27 Sep	UK Ladies Championship	Northern Snooker Centre in Leeds, England	Ng On-Yee (HKG)	5‍–‍1	Reanne Evans (ENG)	
5 Dec	6 Dec	Eden Ladies Masters	Cambridge Snooker Centre in Cambridge, England	Reanne Evans (ENG)	5‍–‍0	Laura Evans (WAL)	
6 Feb		Connie Gough Trophy	Dunstable Snooker Club in Dunstable, England	Reanne Evans (ENG)	4‍–‍0	Maria Catalano (ENG)	
5 Mar	6 Mar	Eden Classic	North East Derbyshire Snooker Club in Chesterfield, England	Reanne Evans (ENG)	5‍–‍1	Ng On-Yee (HKG)	
2 Apr	5 Apr	World Ladies Championship	Northern Snooker Centre in Leeds, England	Reanne Evans (ENG)	6‍–‍4	Ng On-Yee (HKG)	

=== Seniors events ===
Start	Finish	Tournament	Venue	Winner	Score	Runner-up	Ref.
30 Jan	31 Jan	World Seniors Championship	Preston Guild Hall in Preston, England	Mark Davis (ENG)	2‍–‍1	Darren Morgan (WAL)	

=== Other events ===
Start	Finish	Tournament	Venue	Winner	Score	Runner-up	Ref.
7 May	10 May	Vienna Open	15 Reds Köö Wien Snooker Club in Vienna, Austria	Peter Ebdon (ENG)	5‍–‍3	Mark King (ENG)	
15 Jul	19 Jul	Pink Ribbon	The Capital Venue in Gloucester, England	Ronnie O'Sullivan (ENG)	4‍–‍2	Darryn Walker (ENG)	
11 Nov	14 Nov	General Cup Qualifying Event	General Snooker Club in Hong Kong, China	Zhang Anda (CHN)	5‍–‍4	Cao Yupeng (CHN)	
16 Nov	21 Nov	General Cup	General Snooker Club in Hong Kong, China	Marco Fu (HKG)	7‍–‍3	Mark Williams (WAL)	

== Points distribution ==
2015/2016 points distribution for World Snooker Tour ranking and minor-ranking events:

Tournament/Round→	R144	R128	R96	R80	R64	R48	R32	R16	QF	SF	F	W
Asian Tour events	–	0	–	–	400	–	800	1,300	1,750	3,500	6,500	13,500
European Tour events	–	0	–	–	525	–	900	1,725	3,000	4,500	9,000	18,750
Players Championship Grand Finals	–	–	–	–	–	–	4,000	7,000	12,500	20,000	38,000	100,000
Australian Goldfields Open	–	0	250 (Note: Players who lose their first match receive no ranking points.)	–	500	1000	4,500	6,000	8,500	10,000	16,000	37,500
Shanghai Masters	–	0	500	–	2,000	3,000	6,000	8,000	12,000	19,500	35,000	85,000
International Championship	–	0	–	–	4,000	–	7,000	12,000	17,500	30,000	65,000	125,000
UK Championship	–	0	–	–	4,000	–	9,000	12,000	20,000	30,000	70,000	150,000
German Masters	–	0	–	–	1,500	–	3,000	3,750	7,500	15,000	26,250	60,000
Welsh Open	–	0	–	–	2,000	–	3,000	5,000	10,000	20,000	30,000	60,000
World Grand Prix	–	–	–	–	–	–	2,500	5,000	10,000	20,000	35,000	100,000
China Open	–	0	–	–	4,000	–	6,500	8,000	12,500	21,000	35,000	85,000
World Championship	0	–	–	6,600	–	9,900	13,250	22,000	33,000	66,000	137,500	330,000
