= Hammad Miah =

English Bangladeshi snooker player (born 1993)

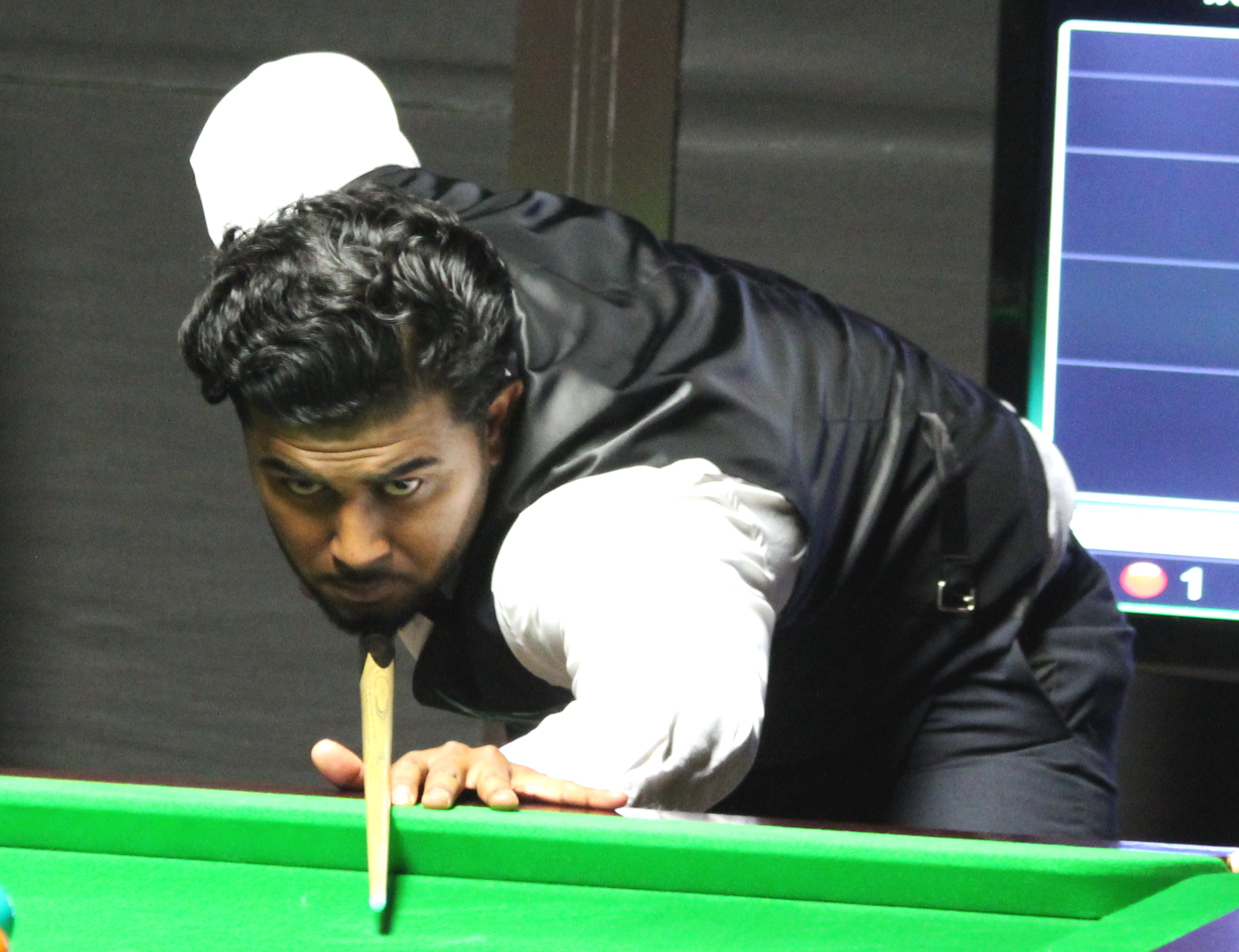
- Paul Hunter Classic 2016

Personal information
- Born: 6 July 1993 (age 33) Hertford, England

Sport
- Country: England
- Sport: Snooker
- Professional: 2013–2015, 2016–2020, 2021–2025, 2026–present
- Highest ranking: 69 (May 2023)
- Current ranking: 118 (as of 7 November 2026)
- Best ranking finish: Last 16 (x3)

Hammad Miah (born 6 July 1993) is an English professional snooker player from Hertford, England.

In May 2013, Miah qualified for the 2013–14 and 2014–15 professional Main Tour as one of four semi-finalists from the first 2013 Q School event.

== Career ==
=== Debut season ===
Miah's first win as a professional was a 5–4 victory over Sydney Wilson in the first qualifying round of the 2013 Australian Goldfields Open, before losing 2–5 to Gerard Greene. He made his debut in a ranking event at the Indian Open by beating Jimmy Robertson 4–3 in the qualifying event, then beat Chen Zhe in the first round, again by a single frame. Miah played local favourite Aditya Mehta in the second round and lost 1–4. He lost in the first round of the UK Championship and Welsh Open 2–6 to Andrew Higginson and 3–4 to Xiao Guodong respectively. Miah also met Xiao in the first round of the China Open and was beaten again this time 2–5.

=== 2014–2015 season ===
Miah had a poor 2014–15 season as he could only win one match all year and lost his place on the tour as was placed 100th in the world rankings, well outside top 64 who remain. Miah tried to win his place back at the 2015 Q School and came closest to doing so in the second event when he lost 2–4 to Paul Davison in the penultimate round.

=== 2015–2016 season ===
Miah's Q School Order of Merit gave him entry into the 2015 Australian Goldfields Open qualifiers in which he began with a century break and won his first ranking event match in almost a year by beating Jason Weston 5–2. He lost 1–5 to Anthony Hamilton in the subsequent round. He was eliminated in the third round of three European Tour events during the season, which included scoring 4–3 wins over Mark Davis and Judd Trump. This saw him finish 60th on the Order of Merit to secure a new two-year tour card starting next season.

=== 2016–2017 season ===
Miah edged out Martin Gould 5–4 to qualify for the 2016 World Open, but lost in the wildcard round once in China. Wins over Kurt Dunham, Tian Pengfei and Rory McLeod helped him reach the final qualifying round for the Shanghai Masters and he was beaten 0–5 by Matthew Selt. Miah was 0–3 down to Tom Ford in the opening round of the UK Championship, before levelling at 3–3 in a run which included a century break. He was also 3–5 behind, but came back to win 6–5. A second final frame decider came in the next round against Robert Milkins with Miah losing it. Afterwards Milkins said Miah was not a real snooker player after the pair exchanged words at the end of the match. Miah shocked world number 22 Ricky Walden 10–7 in World Championship qualifying and, after beating Martin O'Donnell 10–7, a match up with Rory McLeod awaited with the winner reaching the Crucible. Miah lost the first seven frames, before taking six in a row. He would ultimately be defeated 7–10.

=== 2018–present ===
He dropped off the tour at the end of 2017/18 but entered the 2018 Q School in an attempt to rejoin immediately. He won event 1 of Q School meaning he has a pro tour card for another two years. After dropping off tour, he immediately regained his card through the 2021 Q School Order of Merit for the 2021-22 and 2022-23 seasons. He won the WSF Championship in 2026 and is able to return to the main tour from the 2026-27 season.

== Personal life ==
Hammad Miah is based at Hertford Snooker Club in Hertford, England. Miah and fellow main tour player Alfie Burden currently co-own the club, having acquired the club in 2024.

== Performance and rankings timeline ==
Tournament	2011/ 12	2013/ 14	2014/ 15	2015/ 16	2016/ 17	2017/ 18	2018/ 19	2019/ 20	2021/ 22	2022/ 23	2023/ 24	2024/ 25	2025/ 26	2026/ 27
Ranking (Note: It shows the ranking at the beginning of the season)	(Note: He was an amateur)	(Note: New players on the Main Tour don't have a ranking)	104			71	(Note: Players qualified through Q School started the season without ranking points)	89		71	(Note: Players qualified One Year Ranking List started the season without ranking points)	83		
Ranking tournaments
Championship League	Non-Ranking Event								RR	RR	RR	RR	A	RR
China Open	A	1R	LQ	LQ	LQ	LQ	LQ	Tournament Not Held						LQ
Wuhan Open	Tournament Not Held										1R	1R	A	WD
British Open	Tournament Not Held								4R	1R	2R	1R	A	LQ
English Open	Tournament Not Held				1R	3R	1R	2R	LQ	1R	1R	LQ	A	LQ
Shenzhen Open (Note: The event was called the Xi'an Grand Prix (2024/2025–2025/2026))	Tournament Not Held											2R	A	LQ
Northern Ireland Open	Tournament Not Held				1R	1R	3R	2R	1R	2R	1R	LQ	A	LQ
International Championship	NH	LQ	LQ	LQ	LQ	LQ	LQ	LQ	Not Held		LQ	LQ	A	LQ
UK Championship	A	1R	1R	1R	2R	2R	1R	1R	2R	LQ	LQ	LQ	LQ	LQ
Shoot Out	Non-Ranking Event				1R	1R	1R	1R	WD	1R	4R	1R	A	
Scottish Open	Tournament Not Held				1R	2R	1R	1R	2R	1R	LQ	LQ	A	
German Masters	A	LQ	LQ	LQ	LQ	1R	LQ	LQ	LQ	LQ	LQ	2R	A	LQ
Welsh Open	A	1R	1R	1R	1R	1R	2R	1R	1R	1R	LQ	LQ	A	
World Grand Prix	Not Held		NR	DNQ	DNQ	DNQ	DNQ	DNQ	DNQ	DNQ	DNQ	DNQ	DNQ	
Players Championship (Note: The event was called the Players Tour Championship Grand Final (2011/2012 and 2013/2014-2015/2016))	DNQ	DNQ	DNQ	DNQ	DNQ	DNQ	DNQ	DNQ	DNQ	DNQ	DNQ	DNQ	DNQ	
World Open	A	LQ	Not Held		WR	LQ	LQ	LQ	Not Held		LQ	LQ	A	
Tour Championship	Tournament Not Held						DNQ	DNQ	DNQ	DNQ	DNQ	DNQ	DNQ	
World Championship	A	LQ	LQ	LQ	LQ	LQ	LQ	LQ	LQ	LQ	LQ	LQ	LQ	
Non-ranking tournaments
Championship League	A	A	A	A	A	A	A	RR	A	A	A	A	A	
Former ranking tournaments
Wuxi Classic	NR	LQ	LQ	Tournament Not Held										
Australian Goldfields Open	A	LQ	LQ	LQ	Tournament Not Held									
Shanghai Masters	A	LQ	LQ	LQ	LQ	LQ	Non-Ranking		Not Held		Non-Ranking Event			
Paul Hunter Classic	Minor-Ranking Event				1R	1R	4R	NR	Tournament Not Held					
Indian Open	NH	2R	LQ	NH	LQ	1R	LQ	Tournament Not Held						
Riga Masters (Note: The event was called the Riga Open (2014/2015-2015/2016))	Not Held		Minor-Ranking		LQ	2R	LQ	LQ	Tournament Not Held					
China Championship	Tournament Not Held				NR	LQ	LQ	1R	Tournament Not Held					
Turkish Masters	Tournament Not Held								LQ	Tournament Not Held				
Gibraltar Open	Not Held			MR	2R	2R	1R	1R	1R	Tournament Not Held				
WST Classic	Tournament Not Held									2R	Tournament Not Held			
European Masters	Tournament Not Held				LQ	LQ	LQ	LQ	LQ	LQ	LQ	Not Held		
Saudi Arabia Masters	Tournament Not Held											2R	A	NH
Former non-ranking tournaments
Six-red World Championship	NH	A	A	A	A	A	A	A	NH	LQ	Tournament Not Held			

Performance Table Legend
LQ	lost in the qualifying draw	#R	lost in the early rounds of the tournament (WR = Wildcard round, RR = Round robin)	QF	lost in the quarter-finals
SF	lost in the semi-finals	F	lost in the final	W	won the tournament
DNQ	did not qualify for the tournament	A	did not participate in the tournament	WD	withdrew from the tournament

NH / Not Held	means an event was not held
NR / Non-Ranking Event	means an event is/was no longer a ranking event
R / Ranking Event	means an event is/was a ranking event
MR / Minor-Ranking Event	means an event is/was a minor-ranking event

== Career finals ==
=== Amateur finals: 3 (2 titles) ===
Outcome	No.	Year	Championship	Opponent in the final	Score
Runner-up	1.	2013	English Under-21 Championship	(England) Chris Wakelin	4–8
Winner	1.	2025	Q Tour Europe – Event 1	(England) Patrick Whelan	4–2
Winner	2.	2026	WSF Championship	(China) Wang Xinbo	5–4
