= Gibraltar Open =

Snooker tournament

Tournament information
- Venue: Europa Point Sports Complex
- Location: Gibraltar
- Established: 2015
- Organisation(s): WPBSA
- Format: Ranking event
- Total prize fund: £251,000
- Final year: 2022
- Final champion: Robert Milkins (ENG)

The Gibraltar Open was a ranking snooker tournament. In 2015 it was part of the Players Tour Championship. The tournament started in 2015 and was staged at the Europa Point Sports Complex in Gibraltar. Robert Milkins was the final champion.

== Winners ==
Year	Winner	Runner-up	Final score	Host city	Season
Gibraltar Open (minor-ranking)
2015	Marco Fu (HKG)	Michael White (WAL)	4–1	Gibraltar	2015–16
Gibraltar Open (ranking)
2017	Shaun Murphy (ENG)	Judd Trump (ENG)	4–2	Gibraltar	2016–17
2018	Ryan Day (WAL)	Cao Yupeng (CHN)	4–0	Gibraltar	2017–18
2019	Stuart Bingham (ENG)	Ryan Day (WAL)	4–1	Gibraltar	2018–19
2020	Judd Trump (ENG)	Kyren Wilson (ENG)	4–3	Gibraltar	2019–20
2021	Judd Trump (ENG)	Jack Lisowski (ENG)	4–0	Milton Keynes, England	2020–21
2022	Robert Milkins (ENG)	Kyren Wilson (ENG)	4–2	Gibraltar	2021–22
