= 2023 European Masters =

Snooker tournament

2023 BetVictor European Masters

Tournament information
- Dates: 22–27 August 2023
- Venue: Kia Metropol Arena
- City: Nuremberg
- Country: Germany
- Organisation: World Snooker Tour
- Format: Ranking event
- Total prize fund: £427,000
- Winner's share: £80,000
- Highest break: Sean O'Sullivan (ENG) (147)

Final
- Champion: Barry Hawkins (ENG)
- Runner-up: Judd Trump (ENG)
- Score: 9‍–‍6

The 2023 European Masters (officially the 2023 BetVictor European Masters) was a professional snooker tournament that took place from 22 to 27 August 2023 at the Kia Metropol Arena in Nuremberg, Germany, the first time that the main stage of a professional ranking event was held in that city. The 25th edition of the European Masters, it was the second ranking event of the 2023‍–‍24 season, following the Championship League and preceding the British Open. It was the second of eight tournaments in the season's European Series. The event featured a prize fund of £427,000, with the winner receiving £80,000.

Qualifying took place from 25 to 29 July 2023 at the Morningside Arena in Leicester, England, although qualifying matches involving the top eight ranked players were held over and played in Nuremberg. The world number one Ronnie O'Sullivan withdrew for medical reasons.

Kyren Wilson was the defending champion, having defeated Barry Hawkins 9‍–‍3 in the final of the previous season's event, but he lost 3‍–‍5 to John Higgins in the quarter-finals. Hawkins reached a second consecutive European Masters final, where he defeated Judd Trump 9‍–‍6 to win his fourth ranking title. It was his first ranking title since the 2017 World Grand Prix, following four consecutive defeats in ranking finals. He re-entered the top 16 in the world rankings after the tournament, moving up from 19th to 13th place.

A total of 50 century breaks were made during the main stage, and a further 41 in qualifying. Sean O'Sullivan made the tournament's highest break, a maximum break in his qualifying match against Hawkins.

== Format ==
The 2023 European Masters was a professional ranking snooker tournament played between 22 and 27 August 2023 at the Kia Metropol Arena in Nuremberg, Germany. The 25th edition of the European Masters tournament—first held as the 1989 European Open—the tournament was the second world ranking event of the 2023‍–‍24 season, following the Championship League and preceding the British Open. It was the second of eight tournaments in the season's European Series, which carries a £150,000 bonus for the player who earns the most prize money across the series. Matches were played as the best of nine frames until the semi-finals, which were best of 11. The final was a best-of-17-frame match played over two sessions. Kyren Wilson was the defending champion, having defeated Barry Hawkins 9‍–‍3 in the final of the previous event.

The tournament marked the first time that the final stages of a professional ranking event had been held in Nuremberg. The event was broadcast on Eurosport across Europe. In China, the event was broadcast on Superstar online, Liaoning TV, Migu, Youku and Huya Live. It was also broadcast on Premier Sports in the Philippines; on Now TV in Hong Kong; on True Vision in Thailand; and on Astro SuperSport in Malaysia and Brunei. In all other locations, the event was broadcast by Matchroom Sport.

=== Prize fund ===
The event featured a prize fund of £427,000, with the winner receiving £80,000. The breakdown of prize money for this event is shown below:

- Winner: £80,000
- Runner-up: £35,000
- Semi-final: £17,500
- Quarter-final: £11,000
- Last 16: £7,500
- Last 32: £4,500
- Last 64: £3,000
- Highest break: £5,000
- Total: £427,000

== Summary ==
=== Qualifying round ===
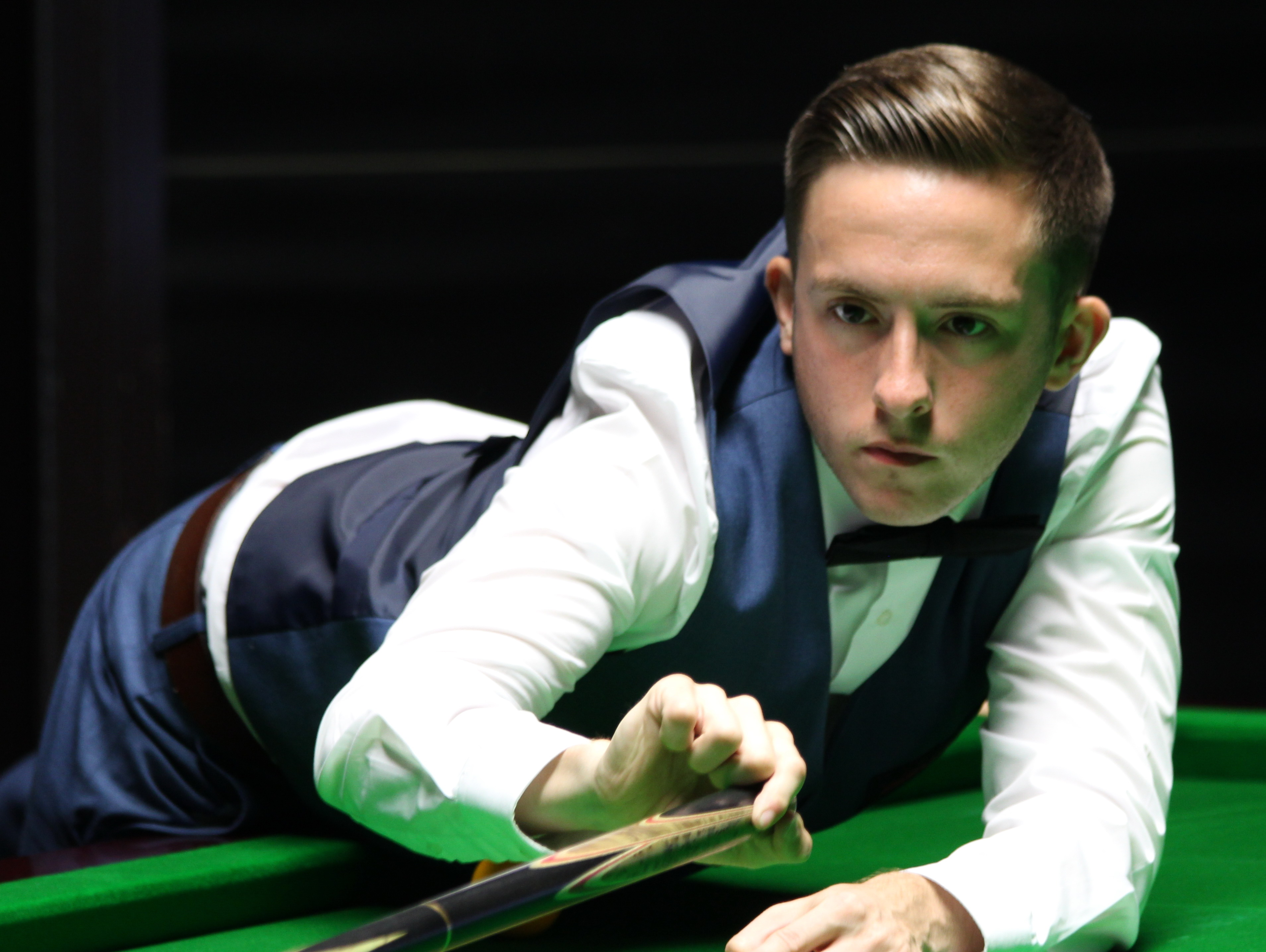
Sean O'Sullivan (pictured in 2016) made his first professional maximum break during the qualifying round in Leicester.

Qualifying for the event took place between 25 and 29 July at the Morningside Arena in Leicester, England. The 12th seed Robert Milkins was defeated by Ben Woollaston, 14th seed Gary Wilson was defeated by Ben Mertens, and 15th seed Ryan Day was defeated by Zak Surety. Additionally, the 17th seed Anthony McGill, 27th seed Matthew Selt, and 30th seed Fan Zhengyi were defeated by Dominic Dale, Anthony Hamilton, and Lyu Haotian, respectively. Sean O'Sullivan made his first maximum break in professional competition against Barry Hawkins, but lost the match.

Qualifying matches featuring the top eight ranked players were played in Nuremberg on 22 August. Graeme Dott was scheduled to play eighth seed Shaun Murphy, but he withdrew for personal reasons and was replaced in the draw by Steven Hallworth. World number one Ronnie O'Sullivan withdrew for medical reasons and his opponent, Andy Hicks, received a bye to the last 64. Seventh seed Neil Robertson lost 3‍–‍5 to Wu Yize.

=== Early rounds ===
The round of 64 was played on 22 and 23 August. Fourth seed Mark Allen was whitewashed 0‍–‍5 by Thepchaiya Un-Nooh, scoring only 17 points in the match. Un-Nooh attempted a maximum break in the final frame, but missed the 11th black. Surety trailed Jiang Jun 0‍–‍4, but recovered to win five consecutive frames for a 5‍–‍4 victory. The 13th seed Jack Lisowski and the 16th seed Hossein Vafaei lost to Michael White and Allan Taylor respectively. Despite winning his qualifying match in England, Liu Hongyu was unable to travel to Germany due to visa issues, and his scheduled opponent Wu received a bye to the last 32.

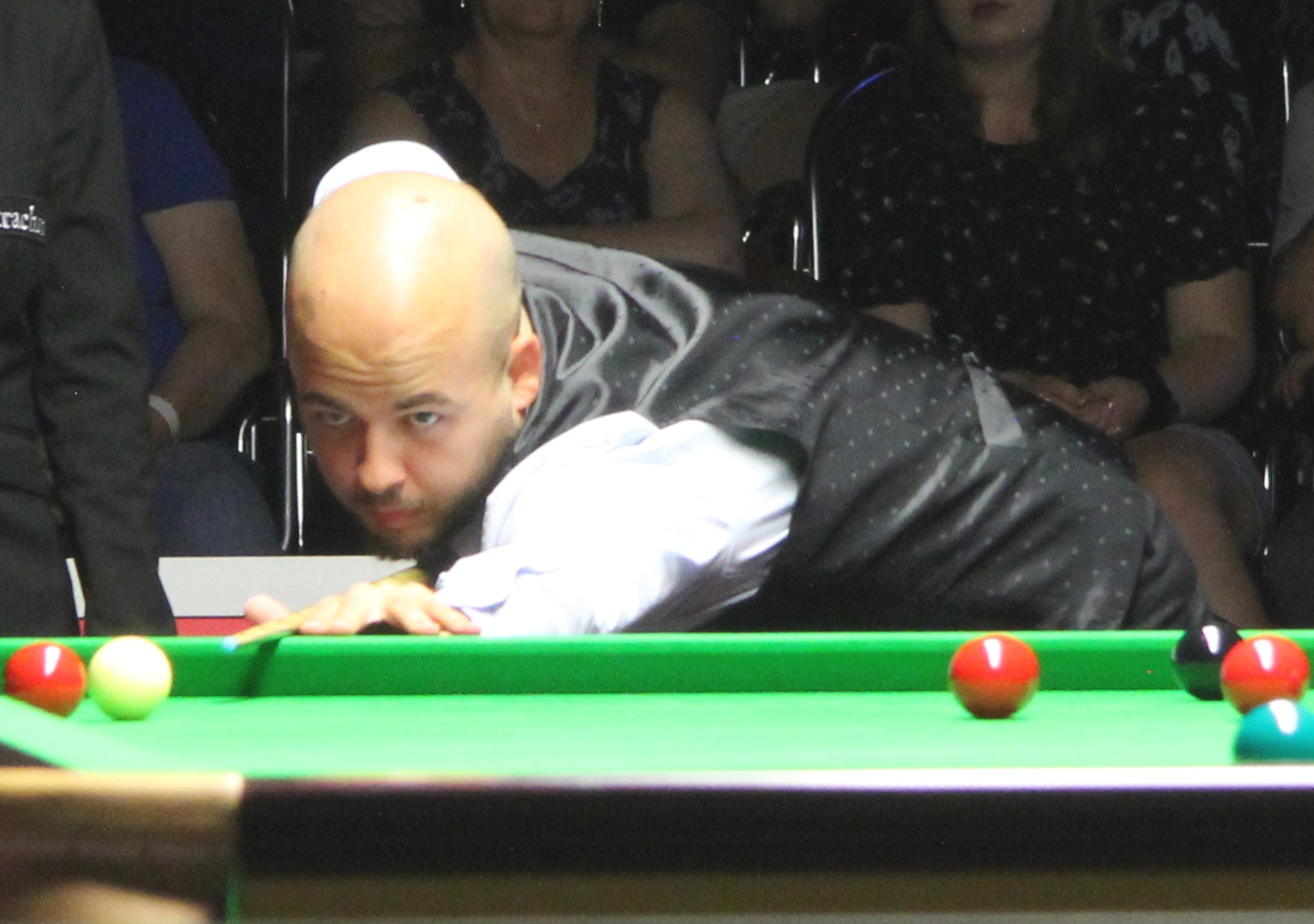
World Champion Luca Brecel (pictured in 2022) used a replacement cue after his main cue went missing on a flight. He lost to Barry Hawkins in the last 16. The cue was subsequently recovered.

The round of 32 was played on 24 August. Fifth seed Judd Trump lost the first four frames to Chris Wakelin but came back to clinch the match 5‍–‍4, meaning that Trump had won all 11 meetings between the two players. The defending champion Kyren Wilson progressed with a 5‍–‍0 whitewash of 2023 World Championship semi-finalist Si Jiahui, while Un-Nooh lost 1‍–‍5 to Ashley Carty. The reigning world champion Luca Brecel was unable to use the cue with which he had won the World Championship, which had been lost on a flight from Seattle to Frankfurt. He trailed Robbie Williams 0‍–‍3 before winning four consecutive frames to lead 4‍–‍3. The match went to a deciding frame, which Brecel won with a total clearance of 134, his 200th century break in professional competition. The 10th seed Mark Williams lost 4‍–‍5 to Jimmy Robertson. The 18th seed Hawkins defeated Surety 5‍–‍1.

The round of 16 was played on 25 August. Murphy played ninth seed John Higgins, the first time in seven years the two players had faced each other on the professional tour. Murphy won the first frame with a 113 break, but Higgins responded with breaks of 126, 66, and 120 to lead 3‍–‍1 at the mid-session interval, and went on to secure a 5‍–‍2 win. Trump and Kyren Wilson recorded whitewash victories over Ben Woollaston and Duane Jones respectively. Carty defeated the 20th seed Ricky Walden 5‍–‍3 to reach the first quarter-final of his professional career. Brecel would have become world number one for the first time had he reached the semi-finals of the event, but he lost 4‍–‍5 to Hawkins. Following the match, Brecel stated that his missing cue had been located after 10 days and sent to his home, which Brecel called "good news", saying he would have had a "horrible season" had it not been found. The sixth seed Mark Selby defeated Ashley Hugill 5‍–‍2, while Lyu beat the 19th seed David Gilbert 5‍–‍1.

=== Later rounds ===
The quarter-finals were played on 25 August. Wilson won the first frame against Higgins, but Higgins won the next three with breaks of 105, 74, and 52. After the mid-session interval, Wilson reduced Higgins's lead to one frame at 4‍–‍3, but Higgins clinched a 5‍–‍3 victory with a 118 break. Trump defeated Carty 5‍–‍1 to set up a semi-final against Higgins. Selby led Lyu 3‍–‍1 at the mid-session interval, but Lyu won the fifth frame and led by 65 points to 8 in the sixth. However, Selby made a 51 break, and the frame came down to a safety battle on the final black ball, which Selby eventually potted to move 4‍–‍2 ahead. Selby clinched a 5‍–‍2 win with a 74 break in frame seven. Hawkins made an 89 break, a 52 break, and two breaks of 70 as he secured a 5‍–‍2 win over Noppon Saengkham, setting up a semi-final against Selby.

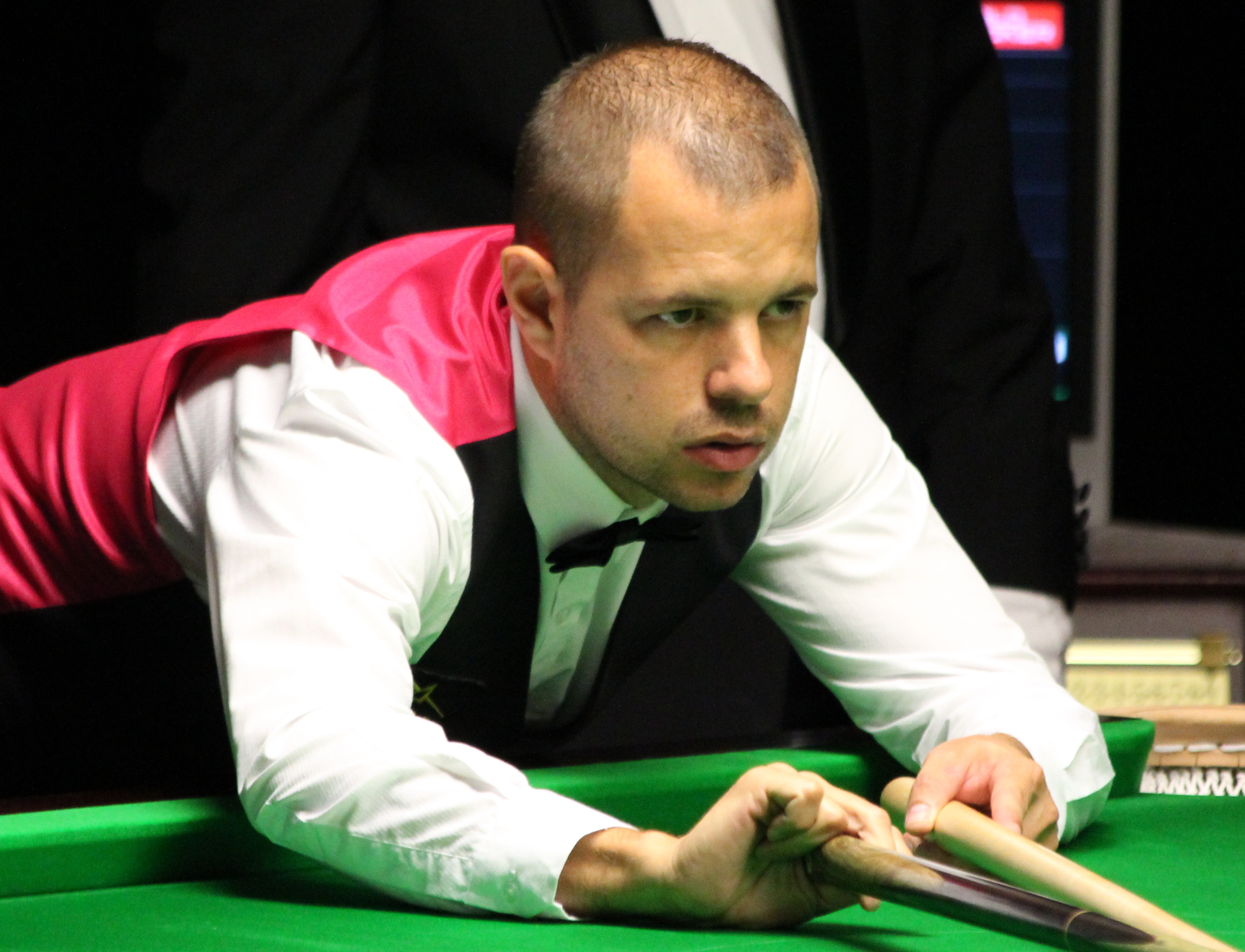
Barry Hawkins (pictured in 2012) defeated Mark Selby in the semi-finals and Judd Trump in the final to win the tournament. It was Hawkins's fourth ranking title and his first in over six years.

The semi-finals were played on 26 August. Higgins produced half-centuries of 59, 50, and 70 to take a 3‍–‍0 lead over Trump. After Higgins missed a red in frame four, Trump produced back-to-back breaks of 111 and 93 to trail by one at 3‍–‍2. Higgins took frame six with a 114 break, but Trump won frames seven and eight to level the scores at 4‍–‍4. Higgins won the ninth with breaks of 54 and 60, but Trump, assisted by a fluke on a red, took the 10th frame to force a decider. Trump then clinched a 6‍–‍5 victory with a 73 break. "I wasn't at my best, but I managed to dig in and do what John [Higgins] and Mark Selby do. They don't give in. I waited for my chances and they came", Trump said afterwards.

In the second semi-final, Selby won the opening frame with a 134 break, but Hawkins won the second with a 106. The scores were tied at 2‍–‍2 at the mid-session interval. Selby won frame five, before Hawkins took frames six and seven with breaks of 92 and 70. Selby tied the scores at 4‍–‍4 with a 94 break in frame eight, and made a 59 break in the ninth, but Hawkins produced a 66 clearance to win the frame on the black ball. Hawkins made a 73 break in the 10th frame to win the match 6‍–‍4 and reach his second consecutive European Masters final. He called winning the ninth frame from 59 points behind "a massive boost in confidence" and said "I held myself together under the utmost pressure".

The final took place on 27 August as the best of 17 frames, played over two sessions, between fifth seed Trump and 18th seed Hawkins. Trump was trying to win his first ranking title since the 2022 Turkish Masters. Hawkins was endeavouring to win his first ranking title since the 2017 World Grand Prix, having lost four consecutive ranking finals at the 2018 Welsh Open, the 2018 China Open, the 2022 Players Championship, and the previous season's European Masters. Hawkins won the first two frames and led 3‍–‍1 at the mid-session interval. Trump reduced his deficit to one frame with a 108 break in frame five. Hawkins won frame six with a 94 break, but Trump made a 107 break to win the seventh. In frame eight, Trump made a 60 break, but Hawkins won the frame on the black to lead 5‍–‍3 after the first session. When play resumed, Hawkins won frame nine after Trump committed a foul on the final black, and won the 10th with a 53 break to lead 7‍–‍3. Trump then won three consecutive frames, reducing Hawkins's lead to one at 7‍–‍6. However, Hawkins won the last two frames for a 9‍–‍6 victory, securing his fourth ranking title. “It has been such a long time since I was in the winner's enclosure. You forget how it feels", Hawkins said afterwards, commenting that: “It is up there with, if not the best win of my career". He re-entered the top 16 in the world rankings after the tournament, moving up from 19th to 13th place.

== Main draw ==
The draw for the tournament is shown below. Numbers in parentheses after the players' names denote the top 32 seeded players, whilst players in bold denote match winners.

=== Top half ===
**Last 64**; Best of 9 frames
**Kyren Wilson (ENG) (1)**	**5**
Alfie Burden (ENG)	2
**Si Jiahui (CHN) (32)**	**5**
Ken Doherty (IRL)	3
Hossein Vafaei (IRN) (16)	0
**Allan Taylor (ENG)**	**5**
Dominic Dale (WAL)	2
**Duane Jones (WAL)**	**5**
Andrew Higginson (ENG)	1
**Zhou Yuelong (CHN) (24)**	**5**
Dylan Emery (WAL)	1
**John Higgins (SCO) (9)**	**5**
**Ross Muir (SCO)**	**5**
Joe Perry (ENG) (25)	3
Daniel Wells (WAL)	2
**Shaun Murphy (ENG) (8)**	**5**
**Judd Trump (ENG) (5)**	**5**
Jordan Brown (NIR)	0
**Chris Wakelin (ENG) (28)**	**5**
Aaron Hill (IRL)	0
**Ben Woollaston (ENG)**	**5**
Xu Si (CHN)	1
**Tom Ford (ENG) (21)**	**5**
Oliver Brown (ENG)	2
Jamie Jones (WAL)	3
**Ricky Walden (ENG) (20)**	**5**
**Michael White (WAL)**	**5**
Jack Lisowski (ENG) (13)	4
**Ashley Carty (ENG)**	**5**
Joe O'Connor (ENG) (29)	4
**Thepchaiya Un-Nooh (THA)**	**5**
Mark Allen (NIR) (4)	0

**Last 32**; Best of 9 frames
**(England) Kyren Wilson (1)**	**5**
(China) Si Jiahui (32)	0
(England) Allan Taylor	3
**(Wales) Duane Jones**	**5**
(China) Zhou Yuelong (24)	2
**(Scotland) John Higgins (9)**	**5**
(Scotland) Ross Muir	0
**(England) Shaun Murphy (8)**	**5**
**(England) Judd Trump (5)**	**5**
(England) Chris Wakelin (28)	4
**(England) Ben Woollaston**	**5**
(England) Tom Ford (21)	4
**(England) Ricky Walden (20)**	**5**
(Wales) Michael White	4
**(England) Ashley Carty**	**5**
(Thailand) Thepchaiya Un-Nooh	1

**Last 16**; Best of 9 frames
**(England) Kyren Wilson (1)**	**5**
(Wales) Duane Jones	0
**(Scotland) John Higgins (9)**	**5**
(England) Shaun Murphy (8)	2
**(England) Judd Trump (5)**	**5**
(England) Ben Woollaston	0
(England) Ricky Walden (20)	3
**(England) Ashley Carty**	**5**

**Quarter-finals**; Best of 9 frames
(England) Kyren Wilson (1)	3
**(Scotland) John Higgins (9)**	**5**
**(England) Judd Trump (5)**	**5**
(England) Ashley Carty	1

**Semi-finals**; Best of 11 frames
(Scotland) John Higgins (9)	5
**(England) Judd Trump (5)**	**6**

=== Bottom half ===
**Last 64**; Best of 9 frames
**Andy Hicks (ENG)**	**5**
Peng Yisong (CHN)	2
**Lyu Haotian (CHN)**	**5**
Elliot Slessor (ENG)	4
**Ben Mertens (BEL)**	**5**
Sanderson Lam (ENG)	3
**David Gilbert (ENG) (19)**	**5**
Reanne Evans (ENG)	1
**Xiao Guodong (CHN)**	**5**
Stuart Bingham (ENG) (22)	3
**Ashley Hugill (ENG)**	**5**
Ali Carter (ENG) (11)	4
Louis Heathcote (ENG)	1
**Anthony Hamilton (ENG)**	**5**
Adam Duffy (ENG)	1
**Mark Selby (ENG) (6)**	**5**
**Wu Yize** (CHN)	**w/o**
Liu Hongyu (CHN)	w/d
**Noppon Saengkham (THA) (26)**	**5**
Mark Davis (ENG)	2
**Mark Williams (WAL) (10)**	**5**
Matthew Stevens (WAL)	3
**Jimmy Robertson (ENG) (23)**	**5**
Scott Donaldson (SCO)	0
James Cahill (ENG)	3
**Barry Hawkins (ENG) (18)**	**5**
Jiang Jun (CHN)	4
**Zak Surety (ENG)**	**5**
**Robbie Williams (ENG)**	**5**
Pang Junxu (CHN) (31)	1
Ishpreet Singh Chadha (IND)	3
**Luca Brecel (BEL) (2)**	**5**

**Last 32**; Best of 9 frames
(England) Andy Hicks	4
**(China) Lyu Haotian**	**5**
(Belgium) Ben Mertens	4
**(England) David Gilbert (19)**	**5**
(China) Xiao Guodong	4
**(England) Ashley Hugill**	**5**
(England) Anthony Hamilton	1
**(England) Mark Selby (6)**	**5**
(China) Wu Yize	2
**(Thailand) Noppon Saengkham (26)**	**5**
(Wales) Mark Williams (10)	4
**(England) Jimmy Robertson (23)**	**5**
**(England) Barry Hawkins (18)**	**5**
(England) Zak Surety	1
(England) Robbie Williams	4
**(Belgium) Luca Brecel (2)**	**5**

**Last 16**; Best of 9 frames
**(China) Lyu Haotian**	**5**
(England) David Gilbert (19)	1
(England) Ashley Hugill	2
**(England) Mark Selby (6)**	**5**
**(Thailand) Noppon Saengkham (26)**	**5**
(England) Jimmy Robertson (23)	4
**(England) Barry Hawkins (18)**	**5**
(Belgium) Luca Brecel (2)	4

**Quarter-finals**; Best of 9 frames
(China) Lyu Haotian	2
**(England) Mark Selby (6)**	**5**
(Thailand) Noppon Saengkham (26)	2
**(England) Barry Hawkins (18)**	**5**

**Semi-finals**; Best of 11 frames
(England) Mark Selby (6)	4
**(England) Barry Hawkins (18)**	**6**

Note: w/o = walk-over; w/d = withdrawn

=== Final ===
Final: Best of 17 frames. Referee: Maike Kesseler; Kia Metropol Arena, Nuremberg, Germany, 27 August 2023
Judd Trump (5); England	6–**9**	**Barry Hawkins** (18); England
Afternoon: 46–**60**, 32–**78**, **65**–43, 42–**70**, **108**–14 (108), 0–**94**, **108**–6 (107), 60–**70**; Evening: 55–**62**, 1–**93**, **75**–31, **70**–6, **73**–49, 0–**75**, 13–**71**
(frame 5) **108**	Highest break	94 (frame 6)
**2**	Century breaks	0

== Qualifying ==
The results from qualification are shown below. Numbers in parentheses after the players' names denote the top 32 seeded players, whilst players in bold denote match winners.

=== Nuremberg ===
The results of the held over qualifying matches played in Nuremberg on 22 August were as follows:

- Ronnie O'Sullivan (ENG) (3) w/d–**w/o** **Andy Hicks** (ENG) (Note: Ronnie O'Sullivan withdrew due to medical reasons.)
- **Mark Selby** (ENG) (6) **5**–0 Manasawin Phetmalaikul (THA)
- **Kyren Wilson** (ENG) (1) **5**–1 Dean Young (SCO)
- **Judd Trump** (ENG) (5) **5**–0 Mohamed Ibrahim (EGY)
- **Mark Allen** (NIR) (4) **5**–0 Anton Kazakov (UKR)
- **Luca Brecel** (BEL) (2) **5**–3 Jackson Page (WAL)
- Neil Robertson (AUS) (7) 3–**5** **Wu Yize** (CHN)
- **Shaun Murphy** (ENG) (8) **5**–2 Steven Hallworth (ENG) (Note: Steven Hallworth replaced Graeme Dott who withdrew.)

=== Leicester ===
The results of the qualifying matches played in Leicester were as follows:

==== 25 July ====
- **Thepchaiya Un-Nooh** (THA) **5**–0 Asjad Iqbal (PAK)
- **Xiao Guodong** (CHN) **5**–1 Sydney Wilson (ENG)
- **Jamie Jones** (WAL) **5**–4 Yuan Sijun (CHN)
- **Aaron Hill** (IRL) **5**–4 Jimmy White (ENG)
- **Noppon Saengkham** (THA) (26) **5**–2 Ian Burns (ENG)
- **Zak Surety** (ENG) **5**–3 Ryan Day (WAL) (15)
- **Duane Jones** (WAL) **5**–1 Liam Graham (SCO)
- **Michael White** (WAL) **5**–2 Jak Jones (WAL)
- **John Higgins** (SCO) (9) **5**–1 Martin Gould (ENG)
- **Joe Perry** (ENG) (25) **5**–0 Muhammad Asif (PAK)
- **Oliver Brown** (ENG) **5**–4 Liam Pullen (ENG)
- **Elliot Slessor** (ENG) **5**–4 Stan Moody (ENG)

==== 26 July ====
- **Zhou Yuelong** (CHN) (24) **5**–1 Stuart Carrington (ENG)
- **Pang Junxu** (CHN) (31) **5**–1 Mink Nutcharut (THA)
- **Andrew Higginson** (ENG) **5**–3 Cao Yupeng (CHN)
- **Daniel Wells** (WAL) **5**–2 Andres Petrov (EST)
- **Jiang Jun** (CHN) **5**–1 Andrew Pagett (WAL)
- **Si Jiahui** (CHN) (32) **5**–2 Julien Leclercq (BEL)
- **Ben Woollaston** (ENG) **5**–3 Robert Milkins (ENG) (12)
- **Matthew Stevens** (WAL) **5**–3 Iulian Boiko (UKR)
- **Ashley Carty** (ENG) **5**–2 Martin O'Donnell (ENG)
- **Ken Doherty** (IRL) **5**–4 David Lilley (ENG)
- **Dominic Dale** (WAL) **5**–2 Anthony McGill (SCO) (17)
- **Ricky Walden** (ENG) (20) **5**–3 Lukas Kleckers (GER)

==== 27 July ====
- **James Cahill** (ENG) **5**–0 Baipat Siripaporn (THA)
- **Mark Davis** (ENG) **5**–1 Ahmed Aly Elsayed (USA)
- **Ross Muir** (SCO) **5**–0 He Guoqiang (CHN)
- **Louis Heathcote** (ENG) **5**–2 Andy Lee (HKG)
- **Liu Hongyu** (CHN) **5**–1 Hammad Miah (ENG)
- **Jimmy Robertson** (ENG) (23) **5**–1 Himanshu Jain (IND)
- **Allan Taylor** (ENG) **5**–2 Tian Pengfei (CHN)
- **Alfie Burden** (ENG) **5**–4 Haydon Pinhey (ENG)
- **Ben Mertens** (BEL) **5**–4 Gary Wilson (ENG) (14)
- **Sanderson Lam** (ENG) **5**–3 Mark Joyce (ENG)
- **Jack Lisowski** (ENG) (13) **5**–3 Sam Craigie (ENG)
- **Reanne Evans** (ENG) **5**–4 Jenson Kendrick (ENG)

==== 28 July ====
- **Tom Ford** (ENG) (21) **5**–1 Victor Sarkis (BRA)
- **Ashley Hugill** (ENG) **5**–1 Long Zehuang (CHN)
- **Jordan Brown** (NIR) **5**–2 Ma Hailong (CHN)
- **Chris Wakelin** (ENG) (28) **5**–2 Rory Thor (MAS)
- **Mark Williams** (WAL) (10) **5**–0 Zhang Anda (CHN)
- **Barry Hawkins** (ENG) (18) **5**–2 Sean O'Sullivan (ENG)
- **Ishpreet Singh Chadha** (IND) **5**–2 Ryan Thomerson (AUS)
- **Robbie Williams** (ENG) **5**–3 John Astley (ENG)
- **Ali Carter** (ENG) (11) **5**–2 Alfie Davies (WAL)
- **David Gilbert** (ENG) (19) **5**–3 Oliver Lines (ENG)
- **Scott Donaldson** (SCO) **5**–3 David Grace (ENG)
- **Anthony Hamilton** (ENG) **5**–4 Matthew Selt (ENG) (27)

==== 29 July ====
- **Joe O'Connor** (ENG) (29) **5**–0 Rebecca Kenna (ENG)
- **Xu Si** (CHN) **5**–2 Alexander Ursenbacher (SUI)
- **Dylan Emery** (WAL) **5**–2 Barry Pinches (ENG)
- **Peng Yisong** (CHN) **5**–3 Xing Zihao (CHN)
- **Hossein Vafaei** (IRN) (16) **5**–1 Rod Lawler (ENG)
- **Stuart Bingham** (ENG) (22) **5**–2 Jamie Clarke (WAL)
- **Lyu Haotian** (CHN) **5**–4 Fan Zhengyi (CHN) (30)
- **Adam Duffy** (ENG) **5**–4 Marco Fu (HKG)

== Century breaks ==
=== Main stage centuries ===
A total of 50 century breaks were made during the main stage of the tournament.

- 138, 125, 123 – Ricky Walden
- 136 – Noppon Saengkham
- 135 – Michael White
- 134, 106, 103 – Mark Selby
- 134, 101 – Luca Brecel
- 133, 132, 106, 101 – Barry Hawkins
- 130 – Ali Carter
- 129 – Ashley Carty
- 128 – Thepchaiya Un-Nooh
- 126, 120, 118, 114, 105 – John Higgins
- 124, 105 – Mark Williams
- 124 – Zhou Yuelong
- 122, 104 – Ben Mertens
- 117, 113, 111, 108, 107, 106, 100, 100 – Judd Trump
- 117 – Ken Doherty
- 113, 111, 104 – Shaun Murphy
- 110 – Anthony Hamilton
- 110 – Neil Robertson
- 108 – David Gilbert
- 107, 102, 101 – Kyren Wilson
- 107 – Jack Lisowski
- 106 – Ashley Hugill
- 105 – Joe O'Connor
- 105 – Jimmy Robertson
- 102 – Ishpreet Singh Chadha

=== Qualifying stage centuries ===
A total of 41 century breaks were made during the qualifying stage of the tournament.

- 147 – Sean O'Sullivan
- 141, 105 – Jack Lisowski
- 139, 104 – Jiang Jun
- 138 – Martin Gould
- 135, 131 – Joe O'Connor
- 135, 118 – Jamie Jones
- 135, 105 – Zak Surety
- 135, 101 – Marco Fu
- 134 – Scott Donaldson
- 133 – Rory Thor
- 131 – Xing Zihao
- 131 – Ishpreet Singh Chadha
- 129 – John Higgins
- 125 – Dylan Emery
- 122 – Jimmy Robertson
- 120 – Dominic Dale
- 118 – Stan Moody
- 117 – Barry Hawkins
- 116, 107, 105 – Zhou Yuelong
- 113, 100 – Ben Mertens
- 112 – Ashley Carty
- 111 – Iulian Boiko
- 110 – Oliver Brown
- 106 – Noppon Saengkham
- 104 – Mark Williams
- 103, 102 – Andrew Higginson
- 103 – Xiao Guodong
- 102 – Si Jiahui
- 102 – Xu Si
- 100 – Louis Heathcote
- 100 – Rod Lawler
