= 2014 Australian Goldfields Open =

Australian Goldfields Open
Tournament information
- Dates: 30 June – 6 July 2014
- Venue: Bendigo Stadium
- City: Bendigo
- Country: Australia
- Organisation: World Snooker
- Format: Ranking event
- Total prize fund: $500,000
- Winner's share: $75,000
- Highest break: Neil Robertson (AUS) (140)

Final
- Champion: Judd Trump (ENG)
- Runner-up: Neil Robertson (AUS)
- Score: 9–5

The 2014 Australian Goldfields Open was a professional ranking snooker tournament that took place between 30 June–6 July 2014 at the Bendigo Stadium in Bendigo, Australia. It was the second ranking event of the 2014/2015 season.

Marco Fu was the defending champion, but he decided not to compete this year.

Judd Trump won his fourth ranking title by defeating Neil Robertson 9–5 in the final.

== Prize fund ==
The breakdown of prize money for this year is shown below:

- Winner: $75,000
- Runner-up: $32,000
- Semi-final: $20,000
- Quarter-final: $17,000
- Last 16: $12,000
- Last 32: $9,000
- Last 48: $1,600
- Last 64: $750
- Last 96: $150
- Non-televised highest break: $100
- Televised highest break: $2,500
- Total: $500,000

== Wildcard round ==
These matches were played in Bendigo on 30 June 2014.

Match		Score	
WC1	Andrew Higginson (ENG)	5–0	Matthew Bolton (AUS)
WC2	Dominic Dale (WAL)	5–0	Johl Younger (AUS)

== Main draw ==
Last 32; Best of 9 frames
1	(Australia) Neil Robertson	5
(England) Andrew Higginson	2
9	(Scotland) Stephen Maguire	0
(Wales) Jamie Jones	5
13	(England) Robert Milkins	5
(China) Liang Wenbo	3
7	(Scotland) John Higgins	5
(England) Tom Ford	3
8	(England) Stuart Bingham	5
(Scotland) Scott Donaldson	0
14	(Wales) Ryan Day	3
(England) Mark Joyce	5
11	(England) Mark Davis	5
(Wales) Dominic Dale	3
4	(England) Shaun Murphy	5
(England) Jack Lisowski	0
3	(England) Judd Trump	5
(England) Rory McLeod	2
10	(England) Joe Perry	4
(Scotland) Alan McManus	5
15	(England) Michael Holt	3
(England) Martin Gould	5
6	(England) Ricky Walden	5
(Scotland) Marcus Campbell	0
5	(Northern Ireland) Mark Allen	2
(Republic of Ireland) Fergal O'Brien	5
12	(Wales) Matthew Stevens	5
(Belgium) Luca Brecel	3
16	(China) Xiao Guodong	5
(England) Liam Highfield	2
2	(England) Barry Hawkins	2
(England) Peter Ebdon	5

Last 16; Best of 9 frames
1	(Australia) Neil Robertson	5
(Wales) Jamie Jones	0
13	(England) Robert Milkins	5
7	(Scotland) John Higgins	2
8	(England) Stuart Bingham	5
(England) Mark Joyce	2
11	(England) Mark Davis	5
4	(England) Shaun Murphy	3
3	(England) Judd Trump	5
(Scotland) Alan McManus	3
(England) Martin Gould	2
6	(England) Ricky Walden	5
(Republic of Ireland) Fergal O'Brien	2
12	(Wales) Matthew Stevens	5
16	(China) Xiao Guodong	5
(England) Peter Ebdon	4

Quarter-finals; Best of 9 frames
1	(Australia) Neil Robertson	5
13	(England) Robert Milkins	2
8	(England) Stuart Bingham	4
11	(England) Mark Davis	5
3	(England) Judd Trump	5
6	(England) Ricky Walden	4
12	(Wales) Matthew Stevens	2
16	(China) Xiao Guodong	5

Semi-finals; Best of 11 frames
1	(Australia) Neil Robertson	6
11	(England) Mark Davis	2
3	(England) Judd Trump	6
16	(China) Xiao Guodong	3

Final; Best of 17 frames
1	(Australia) Neil Robertson	5
3	(England) Judd Trump	9

== Final ==
Final: Best of 17 frames. Referee: Brendan Moore. Bendigo Stadium, Bendigo, Australia, 6 July 2014.
Neil Robertson (1); Australia	5–9	Judd Trump (3); England
Afternoon: 87–48, 23–77, 73–4, 0–69 (50), 45–90 (71), 74–55 (Robertson 52), 25–63 (55), 0–118 (114); Evening: 43–65, 8–96, 28–101 (101), 64–6, 109–8 (109), 40–65 (51)
109	Highest break	114
1	Century breaks	2
2	50+ breaks	6

== Qualifying ==
These matches were held between 30 May and 3 June 2014 at The Capital Venue in Gloucester, England.

Round 1 Best of 9 frames
(England) Sanderson Lam	5
(England) Joe Roberts	3
(China) Liu Chuang	4
(England) George Pragnall	5
(England) David Grace	1
(England) Nico Elton	5
(England) Michael Wasley	1
(England) Craig Steadman	5
(England) Zak Surety	4
(England) Steven Hallworth	5
(England) Ryan Clark	1
(China) Lu Ning	5
(Malta) Alex Borg	3
(England) Shane Castle	5
(England) Andrew Norman	3
(England) Oliver Brown	5
(Scotland) Scott Donaldson	5
(England) Saqib Nasir	0
(England) Lee Page	3
(England) Michael Tomlinson	5
(England) Elliot Slessor	5
(England) Sydney Wilson	2
(England) Ian Burns	5
(Canada) Alex Pagulayan	1
(China) Cao Xinlong	2
(England) Adam Duffy	5
(Switzerland) Alexander Ursenbacher	5
(England) Martin O'Donnell	4
(England) Oliver Lines	5
(England) Paul Davison	3
(England) James Cahill	5
(China) Wang Zepeng	1
(Wales) Lee Walker	5
(Republic of Ireland) John Sutton	3
(Wales) Andrew Pagett	5
(England) Matthew Day	2
(Thailand) Ratchayothin Yotharuck	w/d
(England) Adam Bobat	w/o
(Australia) Vinnie Calabrese	4
(England) William Lemons	5
(Scotland) Fraser Patrick	0
(China) Zhou Yuelong	5
(China) Lu Chenwei	3
(England) Ashley Carty	5
(England) Hammad Miah	4
(Scotland) Michael Leslie	5
(England) Sam Baird	5
(England) Craig Barber	1
(England) Joel Walker	5
(England) Brandon Sargeant	2
(Scotland) Ross Muir	5
(England) Chris Melling	3
(Wales) Jak Jones	5
(England) Joe O'Connor	4
(England) Ian Glover	3
(Wales) Daniel Wells	5
(England) Chris Norbury	1
(England) Liam Highfield	5
(England) Chris Wakelin	3
(Isle of Man) Darryl Hill	5
(England) Barry Pinches	5
(England) Sean O'Sullivan	4
(England) Allan Taylor	5
(England) Michael Georgiou	4

Round 2 Best of 9 frames
(India) Aditya Mehta	5
(England) Sanderson Lam	0
(China) Cao Yupeng	5
(England) George Pragnall	1
(Wales) Jamie Jones	5
(England) Nico Elton	2
(England) John Astley	5
(England) Craig Steadman	2
(England) Jimmy Robertson	5
(England) Steven Hallworth	2
(Northern Ireland) Gerard Greene	4
(China) Lu Ning	5
(England) Gary Wilson	5
(England) Shane Castle	3
(England) Dave Harold	1
(England) Oliver Brown	5
(England) Jimmy White	4
(Scotland) Scott Donaldson	5
(England) Robbie Williams	5
(England) Michael Tomlinson	4
(England) Peter Lines	1
(England) Elliot Slessor	5
(Scotland) Jamie Burnett	2
(England) Ian Burns	5
(China) Li Hang	5
(England) Adam Duffy	4
(China) Lyu Haotian	5
(Switzerland) Alexander Ursenbacher	2
(England) Jack Lisowski	5
(England) Oliver Lines	3
(Finland) Robin Hull	3
(England) James Cahill	5
(England) Rory McLeod	5
(Wales) Lee Walker	4
(Thailand) Noppon Saengkham	w/d
(Wales) Andrew Pagett	w/o
(Northern Ireland) Joe Swail	5
(England) Adam Bobat	2
(England) Alfie Burden	5
(England) William Lemons	1
(England) Mike Dunn	5
(China) Zhou Yuelong	2
(England) Kyren Wilson	0
(England) Ashley Carty	5
(Republic of Ireland) David Morris	w/d
(Scotland) Michael Leslie	w/o
(Thailand) Dechawat Poomjaeng	w/d
(England) Sam Baird	w/o
(Scotland) Anthony McGill	5
(England) Joel Walker	3
(England) Stuart Carrington	5
(Scotland) Ross Muir	3
(England) Nigel Bond	5
(Wales) Jak Jones	1
(Belgium) Luca Brecel	5
(Wales) Daniel Wells	2
(China) Yu Delu	1
(England) Liam Highfield	5
(Thailand) Thepchaiya Un-Nooh	w/d
(Isle of Man) Darryl Hill	w/o
(England) Alex Davies	4
(England) Barry Pinches	5
(England) Matthew Selt	3
(England) Allan Taylor	5

Round 3 Best of 9 frames
(India) Aditya Mehta	5
(China) Cao Yupeng	2
(Wales) Jamie Jones	5
(England) John Astley	3
(England) Jimmy Robertson	5
(China) Lu Ning	4
(England) Gary Wilson	3
(England) Oliver Brown	5
(Scotland) Scott Donaldson	5
(England) Robbie Williams	0
(England) Elliot Slessor	2
(England) Ian Burns	5
(China) Li Hang	3
(China) Lyu Haotian	5
(England) Jack Lisowski	5
(England) James Cahill	2
(England) Rory McLeod	5
(Wales) Andrew Pagett	1
(Northern Ireland) Joe Swail	5
(England) Alfie Burden	4
(England) Mike Dunn	5
(England) Ashley Carty	4
(Scotland) Michael Leslie	5
(England) Sam Baird	3
(Scotland) Anthony McGill	4
(England) Stuart Carrington	5
(England) Nigel Bond	3
(Belgium) Luca Brecel	5
(England) Liam Highfield	5
(Isle of Man) Darryl Hill	1
(England) Barry Pinches	5
(England) Allan Taylor	1

Round 4 Best of 9 frames
(England) Andrew Higginson	5
(India) Aditya Mehta	4
(England) Mark King	1
(Wales) Jamie Jones	5
(China) Liang Wenbo	5
(England) Jimmy Robertson	2
(England) Tom Ford	5
(England) Oliver Brown	1
(Norway) Kurt Maflin	2
(Scotland) Scott Donaldson	5
(England) Mark Joyce	5
(England) Ian Burns	4
(Wales) Dominic Dale	5
(China) Lyu Haotian	0
(England) David Gilbert	2
(England) Jack Lisowski	5
(Republic of Ireland) Ken Doherty	1
(England) Rory McLeod	5
(Scotland) Alan McManus	5
(Northern Ireland) Joe Swail	4
(England) Martin Gould	5
(England) Mike Dunn	3
(Scotland) Marcus Campbell	5
(Scotland) Michael Leslie	4
(Republic of Ireland) Fergal O'Brien	5
(England) Stuart Carrington	2
(England) Rod Lawler	3
(Belgium) Luca Brecel	5
(England) Ben Woollaston	2
(England) Liam Highfield	5
(England) Peter Ebdon	5
(England) Barry Pinches	3

== Century breaks ==
=== Qualifying stage centuries ===
- 140, 110 – Joe Swail
- 139 – Cao Yupeng
- 138, 119 – Liam Highfield
- 136 – Zhou Yuelong
- 136 – Elliot Slessor
- 130 – Nigel Bond
- 129 – Luca Brecel
- 126 – Jamie Jones
- 126 – Mark King
- 121, 103 – Jack Lisowski
- 121 – Scott Donaldson
- 118 – Anthony McGill
- 114 – Steven Hallworth
- 113 – Alan McManus
- 108 – Cao Xinlong
- 108 – Aditya Mehta
- 107 – Andrew Higginson
- 106 – Liang Wenbo
- 106 – Ian Burns
- 105, 100 – Barry Pinches
- 105 – Mark Joyce
- 104, 100 – Lee Walker
- 102 – Paul Davison
- 102 – Oliver Brown
- 100 – Daniel Wells

=== Televised stage centuries ===
- 140, 109, 103, 100 – Neil Robertson
- 139 – Mark Davis
- 127 – John Higgins
- 122 – Mark Joyce
- 114, 114, 110, 107, 106, 101, 101, 100 – Judd Trump
- 109 – Dominic Dale
- 108 – Peter Ebdon
- 107 – Robert Milkins
- 107 – Martin Gould
- 105 – Matthew Stevens
- 104 – Ricky Walden
- 103 – Fergal O'Brien
- 103 – Shaun Murphy
- 102 – Stuart Bingham
