= 2016 German Masters =

2016 918.com German Masters
Tournament information
- Dates: 3–7 February 2016
- Venue: Tempodrom
- City: Berlin
- Country: Germany
- Organisation: World Snooker
- Format: Ranking event
- Total prize fund: €367,000
- Winner's share: €80,000
- Highest break: Judd Trump (ENG) (125)

Final
- Champion: Martin Gould (ENG)
- Runner-up: Luca Brecel (BEL)
- Score: 9–5

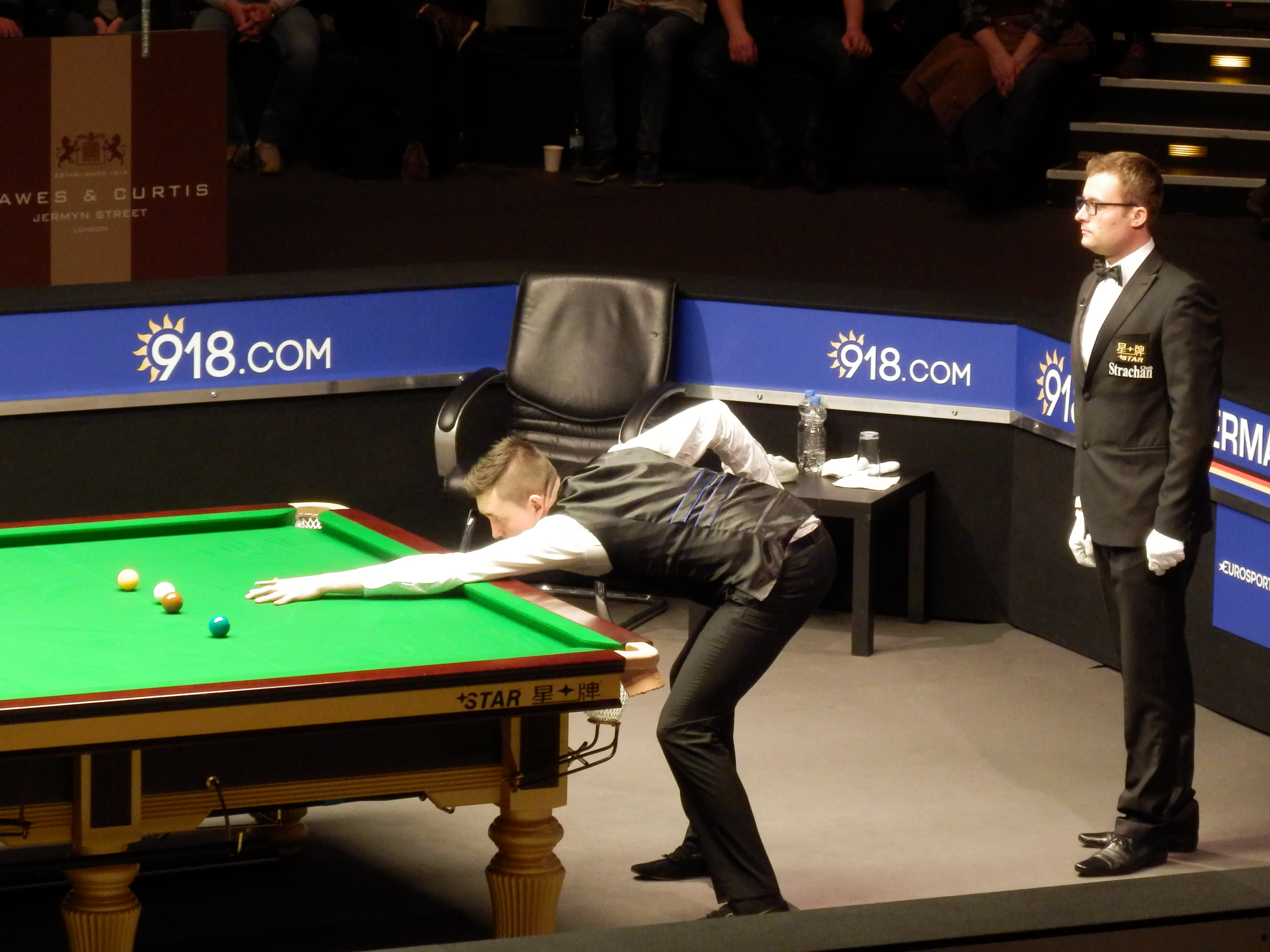
Kyren Wilson in the semi-finals of the German Masters 2016.

The 2016 German Masters (officially the 2016 918.com German Masters) was a professional ranking snooker tournament that took place between 3–7 February 2016 at the Tempodrom in Berlin, Germany. It was the fifth ranking event of the 2015/2016 season.

The defending champion Mark Selby lost 3–5 against Stephen Maguire in the last 16.

Martin Gould won the first ranking title of his professional career, defeating Luca Brecel 9–5 in the final. German referee Maike Kesseler officiated at her first ranking final.

== Prize fund ==
The breakdown of prize money for this year is shown below:

- Winner: €80,000
- Runner-up: €35,000
- Semi-final: €20,000
- Quarter-final: €10,000
- Last 16: €5,000
- Last 32: €4,000
- Last 64: €2,000
- Televised highest break: €4,000
- Total: €367,000

== Main draw ==
Last 32; Best of 9 frames
Mark Selby (ENG) | 5
Steven Hallworth (ENG) | 0
Stephen Maguire (SCO) | 5
Ken Doherty (IRL) | 1
Graeme Dott (SCO) | 5
Tian Pengfei (CHN) | 0
Alan McManus (SCO) | 2
Barry Hawkins (ENG) | 5
Judd Trump (ENG) | 5
Ali Carter (ENG) | 0
Alfie Burden (ENG) | 0
Zhang Anda (CHN) | 5
Martin Gould (ENG) | 5
Mark Williams (WAL) | 4
Ben Woollaston (ENG) | 5
Shaun Murphy (ENG) | 4
Zhao Xintong (CHN) | 2
Luca Brecel (BEL) | 5
Marco Fu (HKG) | 1
Kurt Maflin (NOR) | 5
Mark Joyce (ENG) | 5
Mark Allen (NIR) | 2
Mark King (ENG) | 5
Stuart Carrington (ENG) | 4
Ian Burns (ENG) | 4
Michael Holt (ENG) | 5
Rory McLeod (ENG) | 4
Kyren Wilson (ENG) | 5
Ryan Day (WAL) | 5
Liang Wenbo (CHN) | 3
Fergal O'Brien (IRL) | 2
Stuart Bingham (ENG) | 5

Last 16; Best of 9 frames
(England) Mark Selby | 3
(Scotland) Stephen Maguire | 5
(Scotland) Graeme Dott | 5
(England) Barry Hawkins | 3
(England) Judd Trump | 5
(China) Zhang Anda | 1
(England) Martin Gould | 5
(England) Ben Woollaston | 0
(Belgium) Luca Brecel | 5
(Norway) Kurt Maflin | 3
(England) Mark Joyce | 5
(England) Mark King | 2
(England) Michael Holt | 4
(England) Kyren Wilson | 5
(Wales) Ryan Day | 5
(England) Stuart Bingham | 3

Quarter-finals; Best of 9 frames
(Scotland) Stephen Maguire | 1
(Scotland) Graeme Dott | 5
(England) Judd Trump | 4
(England) Martin Gould | 5
(Belgium) Luca Brecel | 5
(England) Mark Joyce | 4
(England) Kyren Wilson | 5
(Wales) Ryan Day | 4

Semi-finals; Best of 11 frames
(Scotland) Graeme Dott | 2
(England) Martin Gould | 6
(Belgium) Luca Brecel | 6
(England) Kyren Wilson | 3

Final; Best of 17 frames
(England) Martin Gould | 9
(Belgium) Luca Brecel | 5

== Final ==
Final: Best of 17 frames. Referee: Maike Kesseler. Tempodrom, Berlin, Germany, 7 February 2016.
| Martin Gould; England | 9–5 | Luca Brecel; Belgium |
Afternoon: 21–96 (68), 55–50, 52–41, 72–1 (72), 31–73 (51), 83–0 (83), 54–63 (59), 104–4 (104); Evening: 129–0 (110), 58–0, 39–76 (55), 66–32, 56–69 (56, 63), 78–0
| 110 | Highest break | 68 |
| 2 | Century breaks | 0 |
| 5 | 50+ breaks | 5 |

== Qualifying ==
These matches were held between 17 and 20 December 2015 at the Robin Park Arena and Sports Centre in Wigan, England. All matches were best of 9 frames.

=== Round 1 ===
| Mark Selby (ENG) | w/o–w/d | Kuldesh Johal (ENG) |
| Sam Baird (ENG) | 3–5 | David Morris (IRL) |
| Dominic Dale (WAL) | 4–5 | Andy Hicks (ENG) |
| Thepchaiya Un-Nooh (THA) | 4–5 | Steven Hallworth (ENG) |
| Stephen Maguire (SCO) | 5–1 | Chris Wakelin (ENG) |
| Andrew Higginson (ENG) | 5–4 | Joe O'Connor (ENG) |
| Michael White (WAL) | 5–2 | Sanderson Lam (ENG) |
| Ken Doherty (IRL) | 5–4 | Michael Georgiou (ENG) |
| Jamie Burnett (SCO) | 3–5 | Zak Surety (ENG) |
| Graeme Dott (SCO) | w/o–w/d | Fraser Patrick (SCO) |
| Tian Pengfei (CHN) | 5–0 | Lyu Chenwei (CHN) |
| Ding Junhui (CHN) | 5–2 | Gareth Allen (WAL) |
| Mike Dunn (ENG) | 5–4 | Sydney Wilson (ENG) |
| Alan McManus (SCO) | 5–0 | James Wattana (THA) |
| Zhou Yuelong (CHN) | 5–1 | Zhang Yong (CHN) |
| Barry Hawkins (ENG) | 5–2 | Luke Simmonds (ENG) |
| Judd Trump (ENG) | 5–1 | Peter Lines (ENG) |
| David Grace (ENG) | 4–5 | Rhys Clark (SCO) |
| Ali Carter (ENG) | 5–3 | Barry Pinches (ENG) |
| Jimmy Robertson (ENG) | 5–4 | Jason Weston (ENG) |
| Ricky Walden (ENG) | 3–5 | Alfie Burden (ENG) |
| Robin Hull (FIN) | 5–2 | Paul Davison (ENG) |
| Robert Milkins (ENG) | 4–5 | Zhang Anda (CHN) |
| Dechawat Poomjaeng (THA) | 5–3 | Tony Drago (MLT) |
| Gerard Greene (NIR) | 1–5 | Nigel Bond (ENG) |
| Martin Gould (ENG) | 5–1 | Joel Walker (ENG) |
| Li Hang (CHN) | 5–0 | Hatem Yassen (EGY) |
| Mark Williams (WAL) | 5–1 | Thanawat Thirapongpaiboon (THA) |
| Xiao Guodong (CHN) | 5–3 | Lee Walker (WAL) |
| Ben Woollaston (ENG) | 5–2 | Sam Craigie (ENG) |
| Oliver Lines (ENG) | 1–5 | Lu Ning (CHN) |
| Shaun Murphy (ENG) | 5–3 | Michael Wasley (ENG) |

| Neil Robertson (AUS) | 1–5 | Ashley Hugill (ENG) |
| Cao Yupeng (CHN) | 3–5 | Zhao Xintong (CHN) |
| Jamie Jones (WAL) | 5–3 | Adam Duffy (ENG) |
| Luca Brecel (BEL) | 5–2 | James Cahill (ENG) |
| Marco Fu (HKG) | 5–3 | Hammad Miah (ENG) |
| Yu Delu (CHN) | 5–4 | Liam Highfield (ENG) |
| David Gilbert (ENG) | 4–5 | Martin O'Donnell (ENG) |
| Kurt Maflin (NOR) | 5–0 | Jamie Curtis-Barrett (ENG) |
| Mark Joyce (ENG) | 5–3 | Alex Taubman (WAL) |
| Mark Davis (ENG) | 4–5 | Ross Muir (SCO) |
| Robbie Williams (ENG) | 5–1 | Noppon Saengkham (THA) |
| Mark Allen (NIR) | 5–2 | Duane Jones (WAL) |
| Mark King (ENG) | 5–0 | Jimmy White (ENG) |
| Anthony McGill (SCO) | 5–3 | Michael Wild (ENG) |
| Stuart Carrington (ENG) | 5–4 | Jamie Cope (ENG) |
| Ronnie O'Sullivan (ENG) | 5–1 | Hamza Akbar (PAK) |
| John Higgins (SCO) | 5–1 | Ian Glover (ENG) |
| Aditya Mehta (IND) | 1–5 | Ian Burns (ENG) |
| Michael Holt (ENG) | 5–0 | Sean O'Sullivan (ENG) |
| Rod Lawler (ENG) | 5–4 | Craig Steadman (ENG) |
| Joe Perry (ENG) | 5–2 | Chris Melling (ENG) |
| Rory McLeod (ENG) | 5–3 | Vinnie Calabrese (AUS) |
| Kyren Wilson (ENG) | 5–0 | Jake Nicholson (ENG) |
| Jack Lisowski (ENG) | 5–0 | Thor Chuan Leong (MYS) |
| Matthew Stevens (WAL) | 5–1 | Itaro Santos (BRA) |
| Ryan Day (WAL) | 5–2 | Scott Donaldson (SCO) |
| Joe Swail (NIR) | 5–2 | Allan Taylor (ENG) |
| Liang Wenbo (CHN) | 5–4 | Eden Sharav (SCO) |
| Fergal O'Brien (IRL) | 5–4 | Hossein Vafaei (IRN) |
| Peter Ebdon (ENG) | 5–1 | Mitchell Mann (ENG) |
| Anthony Hamilton (ENG) | 5–2 | Darryl Hill (IOM) |
| Stuart Bingham (ENG) | 5–1 | Daniel Wells (WAL) |

=== Round 2 ===
| (England) Mark Selby | 5–3 | (Republic of Ireland) David Morris |
| (England) Andy Hicks | 4–5 | (England) Steven Hallworth |
| (Scotland) Stephen Maguire | 5–2 | (England) Andrew Higginson |
| (Wales) Michael White | 3–5 | (Republic of Ireland) Ken Doherty |
| (England) Zak Surety | 0–5 | (Scotland) Graeme Dott |
| (China) Tian Pengfei | 5–3 | (China) Ding Junhui |
| (England) Mike Dunn | 1–5 | (Scotland) Alan McManus |
| (China) Zhou Yuelong | 3–5 | (England) Barry Hawkins |
| (England) Judd Trump | 5–2 | (Scotland) Rhys Clark |
| (England) Ali Carter | 5–3 | (England) Jimmy Robertson |
| (England) Alfie Burden | 5–1 | (Finland) Robin Hull |
| (China) Zhang Anda | 5–4 | (Thailand) Dechawat Poomjaeng |
| (England) Nigel Bond | 1–5 | (England) Martin Gould |
| (China) Li Hang | 3–5 | (Wales) Mark Williams |
| (China) Xiao Guodong | 4–5 | (England) Ben Woollaston |
| (China) Lu Ning | 2–5 | (England) Shaun Murphy |

| (England) Ashley Hugill | 1–5 | (China) Zhao Xintong |
| (Wales) Jamie Jones | 0–5 | (Belgium) Luca Brecel |
| (Hong Kong) Marco Fu | 5–1 | (China) Yu Delu |
| (England) Martin O'Donnell | 3–5 | (Norway) Kurt Maflin |
| (England) Mark Joyce | 5–3 | (Scotland) Ross Muir |
| (England) Robbie Williams | 0–5 | (Northern Ireland) Mark Allen |
| (England) Mark King | 5–4 | (Scotland) Anthony McGill |
| (England) Stuart Carrington | 5–3 | (England) Ronnie O'Sullivan |
| (Scotland) John Higgins | 3–5 | (England) Ian Burns |
| (England) Michael Holt | 5–4 | (England) Rod Lawler |
| (England) Joe Perry | 3–5 | (England) Rory McLeod |
| (England) Kyren Wilson | 5–1 | (England) Jack Lisowski |
| (Wales) Matthew Stevens | 3–5 | (Wales) Ryan Day |
| (Northern Ireland) Joe Swail | 2–5 | (China) Liang Wenbo |
| (Republic of Ireland) Fergal O'Brien | 5–4 | (England) Peter Ebdon |
| (England) Anthony Hamilton | 4–5 | (England) Stuart Bingham |

== Century breaks ==
=== Qualifying stage centuries ===
- 138, 108 – Michael Wasley
- 137, 131, 116 – Marco Fu
- 137, 122 – Stephen Maguire
- 136 – Dominic Dale
- 133 – Anthony McGill
- 131, 103 – Alan McManus
- 130, 107 – Zhao Xintong
- 130 – Michael White
- 129 – Ian Burns
- 128 – Matthew Stevens
- 127, 104 – Robin Hull
- 127, 102 – Stuart Bingham
- 127 – Mark King
- 126 – Ronnie O'Sullivan
- 124 – Michael Holt
- 122 – Rod Lawler
- 121, 102 – Liang Wenbo
- 121 – Zhou Yuelong
- 120 – Thepchaiya Un-Nooh
- 119 – Barry Hawkins
- 118, 111, 110 – Shaun Murphy
- 115, 108 – Barry Pinches
- 113, 108 – John Higgins
- 105, 100 – Kurt Maflin
- 104 – Tian Pengfei
- 104 – Sam Craigie
- 104 – Fergal O'Brien
- 104 – Eden Sharav
- 103 – Neil Robertson
- 103 – Kyren Wilson
- 102 – Ali Carter
- 102 – Hossein Vafaei

=== Televised stage centuries ===
- 125, 120, 109, 104 – Judd Trump
- 121 – Mark Allen
- 119, 105, 104 – Mark Joyce
- 113 – Fergal O'Brien
- 110, 104, 100 – Martin Gould
- 109 – Stuart Bingham
- 106 – Marco Fu
- 103 – Mark King
- 102 – Graeme Dott
- 102 – Luca Brecel
- 101 – Kurt Maflin
