= 2018 German Masters =

2018 D88 German Masters
Tournament information
- Dates: 31 January – 4 February 2018
- City: Berlin
- Country: Germany
- Organisation: World Snooker
- Format: Ranking event
- Total prize fund: £364,500
- Winner's share: £80,000
- Highest break: Judd Trump (ENG) (140)

Final
- Champion: Mark Williams (WAL)
- Runner-up: Graeme Dott (SCO)
- Score: 9–1

The 2018 German Masters (officially the 2018 D88 German Masters) was a professional ranking snooker tournament, that took place from 31 January to 4 February 2018 in Berlin, Germany. It was the thirteenth ranking event of the 2017/2018 season.

Anthony Hamilton was the defending champion, but he lost 1–5 to Jimmy Robertson in the first round.

Mark Williams won his 20th professional ranking title and his second of the season, defeating Graeme Dott 9–1 in the final.

== Prize fund ==
The breakdown of prize money for this year is shown below:

- Winner: £80,000
- Runner-up: £35,000
- Semi-final: £20,000
- Quarter-final: £10,000
- Last 16: £5,000
- Last 32: £4,000
- Last 64: £2,000
- Highest break: £1,500
- Total: £364,500

The "rolling 147 prize" for a maximum break stood at £5,000.

== Main draw ==
Last 32; Best of 9 frames
Anthony Hamilton (ENG)	1
Jimmy Robertson (ENG)	5
Gary Wilson (ENG)	5
Martin Gould (ENG)	2
Fergal O'Brien (IRL)	3
Mark Williams (WAL)	5
Matthew Selt (ENG)	5
Mark Allen (NIR)	4
Ding Junhui (CHN)	5
Michael Georgiou (CYP)	3
Jack Lisowski (ENG)	3
Ricky Walden (ENG)	5
Joe Perry (ENG)	5
Yu Delu (CHN)	4
Ben Woollaston (ENG)	3
Judd Trump (ENG)	5
Niu Zhuang (CHN)	2
Mark Davis (ENG)	5
Ryan Day (WAL)	5
Thepchaiya Un-Nooh (THA)	1
David Gilbert (ENG)	4
Mark Joyce (ENG)	5
Alan McManus (SCO)	2
Shaun Murphy (ENG)	5
Barry Hawkins (ENG)	3
Graeme Dott (SCO)	5
Hammad Miah (ENG)	1
Mei Xiwen (CHN)	5
Tom Ford (ENG)	1
Liang Wenbo (CHN)	5
Xiao Guodong (CHN)	5
Mark Selby (ENG)	3

Last 16; Best of 9 frames
(England) Jimmy Robertson	5
(England) Gary Wilson	3
(Wales) Mark Williams	5
(England) Matthew Selt	2
(China) Ding Junhui	5
(England) Ricky Walden	2
(England) Joe Perry	3
(England) Judd Trump	5
(England) Mark Davis	4
(Wales) Ryan Day	5
(England) Mark Joyce	1
(England) Shaun Murphy	5
(Scotland) Graeme Dott	5
(China) Mei Xiwen	4
(China) Liang Wenbo	2
(China) Xiao Guodong	5

Quarter-finals; Best of 9 frames
(England) Jimmy Robertson	3
(Wales) Mark Williams	5
(China) Ding Junhui	3
(England) Judd Trump	5
(Wales) Ryan Day	4
(England) Shaun Murphy	5
(Scotland) Graeme Dott	5
(China) Xiao Guodong	4

Semi-finals; Best of 11 frames
(Wales) Mark Williams	6
(England) Judd Trump	1
(England) Shaun Murphy	4
(Scotland) Graeme Dott	6

Final; Best of 17 frames
(Wales) Mark Williams	9
(Scotland) Graeme Dott	1

== Final ==
Final: Best of 17 frames. Referee: Maike Kesseler. Tempodrom, Berlin, Germany, 4 February 2018.
Mark Williams; Wales	9–1	Graeme Dott; Scotland
Afternoon: 79–1, 73–8, 56–72, 66–64, 79–0, 76–40, 74–43, 132–0 (110); Evening: 66–16, 86–8
110	Highest break	64
1	Century breaks	0

== Qualifying ==
These matches were played between 19 and 22 December 2017 at the Barnsley Metrodome in Barnsley, England. All matches were best of 9 frames. Ali Carter was a 2017 German Masters finalist, but he was beaten 5–3 by Wang Yuchen.

=== Round 1 ===
Anthony Hamilton (ENG)	5–3	Chen Zhe (CHN)
Mitchell Mann (ENG)	5–0	Zhang Yong (CHN)
Jimmy Robertson (ENG)	5–3	Rhys Clark (SCO)
Peter Lines (ENG)	5–4	Scott Donaldson (SCO)
Stephen Maguire (SCO)	1–5	Gary Wilson (ENG)
Xu Si (CHN)	4–5	David Grace (ENG)
Martin Gould (ENG)	5–3	Alfie Burden (ENG)
Alexander Ursenbacher (SUI)	3–5	Ken Doherty (IRL)
Fergal O'Brien (IRL)	5–1	Sunny Akani (THA)
Michael White (WAL)	3–5	Robin Hull (FIN)
Basem Eltahhan (EGY)	0–5	Matthew Stevens (WAL)
Mark Williams (WAL)	5–1	Oliver Lines (ENG)
Aditya Mehta (IND)	5–1	Ben Jones (WAL)
Yan Bingtao (CHN)	3–5	Matthew Selt (ENG)
Rod Lawler (ENG)	5–1	Ross Muir (SCO)
Mark Allen (NIR)	5–3	Li Yuan (CHN)
Ding Junhui (CHN)	5–4	Gerard Greene (NIR)
Nigel Bond (ENG)	5–3	Christopher Keogan (ENG)
Zhou Yuelong (CHN)	2–5	Michael Georgiou (CYP)
Elliot Slessor (ENG)	1–5	Ian Burns (ENG)
Kyren Wilson (ENG)	1–5	Jack Lisowski (ENG)
Stuart Carrington (ENG)	5–4	Lee Walker (WAL)
Ricky Walden (ENG)	5–1	Boonyarit Keattikun (THA)
Leo Fernandez (IRL)	3–5	Ashley Hugill (ENG)
Daniel Wells (WAL)	3–5	Thor Chuan Leong (MYS)
Joe Perry (ENG)	5–1	Joe Swail (NIR)
Yu Delu (CHN)	5–0	Jamie Clarke (WAL)
Anthony McGill (SCO)	3–5	Jimmy White (ENG)
Chris Totten (SCO)	5–2	Matthew Bolton (AUS)
Ben Woollaston (ENG)	5–4	Alex Borg (MLT)
Yuan Sijun (CHN)	5–4	Fang Xiongman (CHN)
Judd Trump (ENG)	5–3	Adam Duffy (ENG)

Ronnie O'Sullivan (ENG)	w/d–w/o	Rory McLeod (ENG)
Niu Zhuang (CHN)	5–1	Ian Preece (WAL)
Robert Milkins (ENG)	3–5	Mark Davis (ENG)
Kurt Maflin (NOR)	4–5	Josh Boileau (IRL)
Ryan Day (WAL)	5–0	Kurt Dunham (AUS)
Craig Steadman (ENG)	4–5	John Astley (ENG)
Mark King (ENG)	5–1	Noppon Saengkham (THA)
Martin O'Donnell (ENG)	3–5	Thepchaiya Un-Nooh (THA)
Eden Sharav (SCO)	2–5	Mike Dunn (ENG)
David Gilbert (ENG)	5–3	Tian Pengfei (CHN)
Mark Joyce (ENG)	5–2	Lyu Haotian (CHN)
Ali Carter (ENG)	3–5	Wang Yuchen (CHN)
Sean O'Sullivan (ENG)	2–5	Jackson Page (WAL)
Alan McManus (SCO)	5–4	Dominic Dale (WAL)
Chen Zifan (CHN)	2–5	Cao Yupeng (CHN)
Shaun Murphy (ENG)	5–2	Paul Davison (ENG)
Barry Hawkins (ENG)	5–1	Jamie Curtis-Barrett (ENG)
Hossein Vafaei (IRN)	2–5	Liam Highfield (ENG)
Graeme Dott (SCO)	5–2	Soheil Vahedi (IRN)
Peter Ebdon (ENG)	5–4	Jak Jones (WAL)
Luca Brecel (BEL)	1–5	Hammad Miah (ENG)
Zhao Xintong (CHN)	5–2	Sam Craigie (ENG)
Michael Holt (ENG)	1–5	Mei Xiwen (CHN)
Billy Joe Castle (ENG)	1–5	Robbie Williams (ENG)
Lukas Kleckers (GER)	2–5	Tom Ford (ENG)
Neil Robertson (AUS)	5–2	Chris Wakelin (ENG)
Andrew Higginson (ENG)	5–4	Li Hang (CHN)
Liang Wenbo (CHN)	5–1	Duane Jones (WAL)
Hamza Akbar (PAK)	5–1	Allan Taylor (ENG)
Xiao Guodong (CHN)	5–1	Sanderson Lam (ENG)
Jamie Jones (WAL)	5–4	Zhang Anda (CHN)
Mark Selby (ENG)	5–0	Sam Baird (ENG)

=== Round 2 ===
(England) Anthony Hamilton	5–4	(England) Mitchell Mann
(England) Jimmy Robertson	5–4	(England) Peter Lines
(England) Gary Wilson	5–3	(England) David Grace
(England) Martin Gould	5–4	(Republic of Ireland) Ken Doherty
(Republic of Ireland) Fergal O'Brien	5–2	(Finland) Robin Hull
(Wales) Matthew Stevens	3–5	(Wales) Mark Williams
(India) Aditya Mehta	4–5	(England) Matthew Selt
(England) Rod Lawler	2–5	(Northern Ireland) Mark Allen
(China) Ding Junhui	5–1	(England) Nigel Bond
(Cyprus) Michael Georgiou	5–1	(England) Ian Burns
(England) Jack Lisowski	5–3	(England) Stuart Carrington
(England) Ricky Walden	5–2	(England) Ashley Hugill
(Malaysia) Thor Chuan Leong	0–5	(England) Joe Perry
(China) Yu Delu	5–2	(England) Jimmy White
(Scotland) Chris Totten	2–5	(England) Ben Woollaston
(China) Yuan Sijun	4–5	(England) Judd Trump

(England) Rory McLeod	4–5	(China) Niu Zhuang
(England) Mark Davis	5–0	(Republic of Ireland) Josh Boileau
(Wales) Ryan Day	5–1	(England) John Astley
(England) Mark King	4–5	(Thailand) Thepchaiya Un-Nooh
(England) Mike Dunn	2–5	(England) David Gilbert
(England) Mark Joyce	5–0	(China) Wang Yuchen
(Wales) Jackson Page	0–5	(Scotland) Alan McManus
(China) Cao Yupeng	2–5	(England) Shaun Murphy
(England) Barry Hawkins	5–2	(England) Liam Highfield
(Scotland) Graeme Dott	5–4	(England) Peter Ebdon
(England) Hammad Miah	5–3	(China) Zhao Xintong
(China) Mei Xiwen	5–1	(England) Robbie Williams
(England) Tom Ford	5–3	(Australia) Neil Robertson
(England) Andrew Higginson	3–5	(China) Liang Wenbo
(Pakistan) Hamza Akbar	1–5	(China) Xiao Guodong
(Wales) Jamie Jones	2–5	(England) Mark Selby

== Century breaks ==
=== Televised stage centuries ===
Total: 27

- 140, 109, 103 – Judd Trump
- 138, 104 – Shaun Murphy
- 136 – Mark Joyce
- 136 – Mei Xiwen
- 131, 124 – Ding Junhui
- 130, 117, 115 – Ryan Day
- 121 – Graeme Dott
- 114, 104 – Ben Woollaston
- 112, 108 – Gary Wilson
- 111 – Liang Wenbo
- 110, 109 – Mark Williams
- 109, 103 – Mark Davis
- 103 – Jack Lisowski
- 102 – Ricky Walden
- 101 – David Gilbert
- 101 – Matthew Selt
- 100 – Mark Allen

=== Qualifying stage centuries ===
Total: 52

- 140 – Chen Zifan
- 138 – Christopher Keogan
- 135 – Alfie Burden
- 132, 131, 113, 106 – Jimmy Robertson
- 130, 120, 113 – Mark Allen
- 129 – Michael White
- 126 – Zhang Anda
- 125, 121 – Robin Hull
- 125, 109 – Niu Zhuang
- 124 – Andrew Higginson
- 123 – Cao Yupeng
- 123 – Yu Delu
- 122, 121 – Rory McLeod
- 122 – Xiao Guodong
- 121, 106 – Thepchaiya Un-Nooh
- 121 – Stuart Carrington
- 121 – Sam Craigie
- 120 – Mark Joyce
- 119, 115 – Mark Selby
- 119 – Liam Highfield
- 119 – Michael Holt
- 119 – Daniel Wells
- 116 – Michael Georgiou
- 116 – Zhao Xintong
- 114, 109, 108, 102 – Judd Trump
- 113 – Barry Hawkins
- 112, 100 – Matthew Stevens
- 110 – Mark Davis
- 105 – David Gilbert
- 105 – Jamie Jones
- 105 – Robert Milkins
- 104 – David Grace
- 104 – Jackson Page
- 103 – Fergal O'Brien
- 101 – Neil Robertson
- 101 – Soheil Vahedi
- 101 – Yuan Sijun
- 100 – Liang Wenbo
