= Maike Kesseler =

German snooker referee (born 1982)

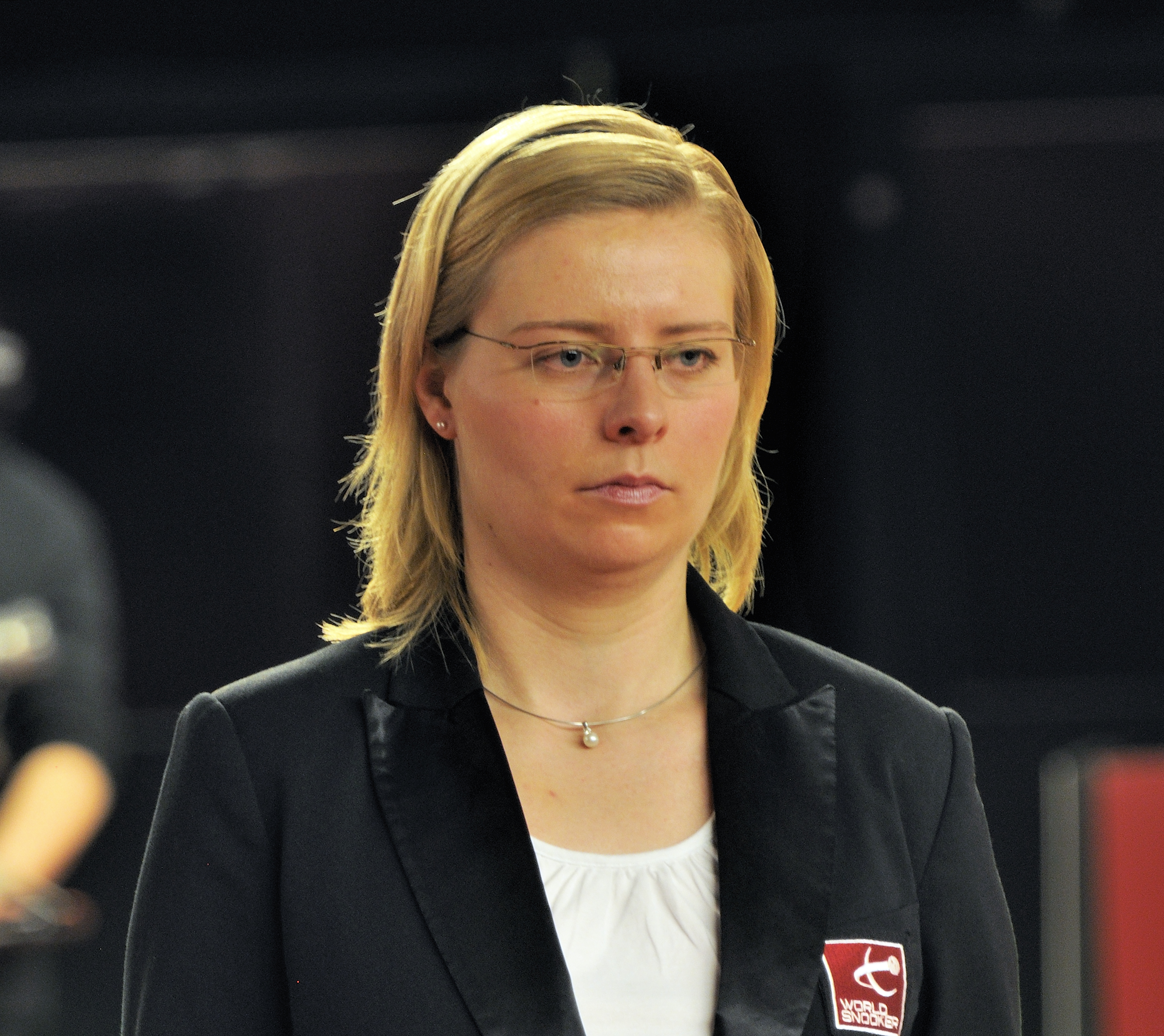
- Maike Kesseler at the 2014 German Masters

Personal information
- Born: 1 January 1982 (age 44) Mammendorf, Bavaria, Germany

Sport
- Country: Germany
- Sport: Snooker
- Professional: 2013–present

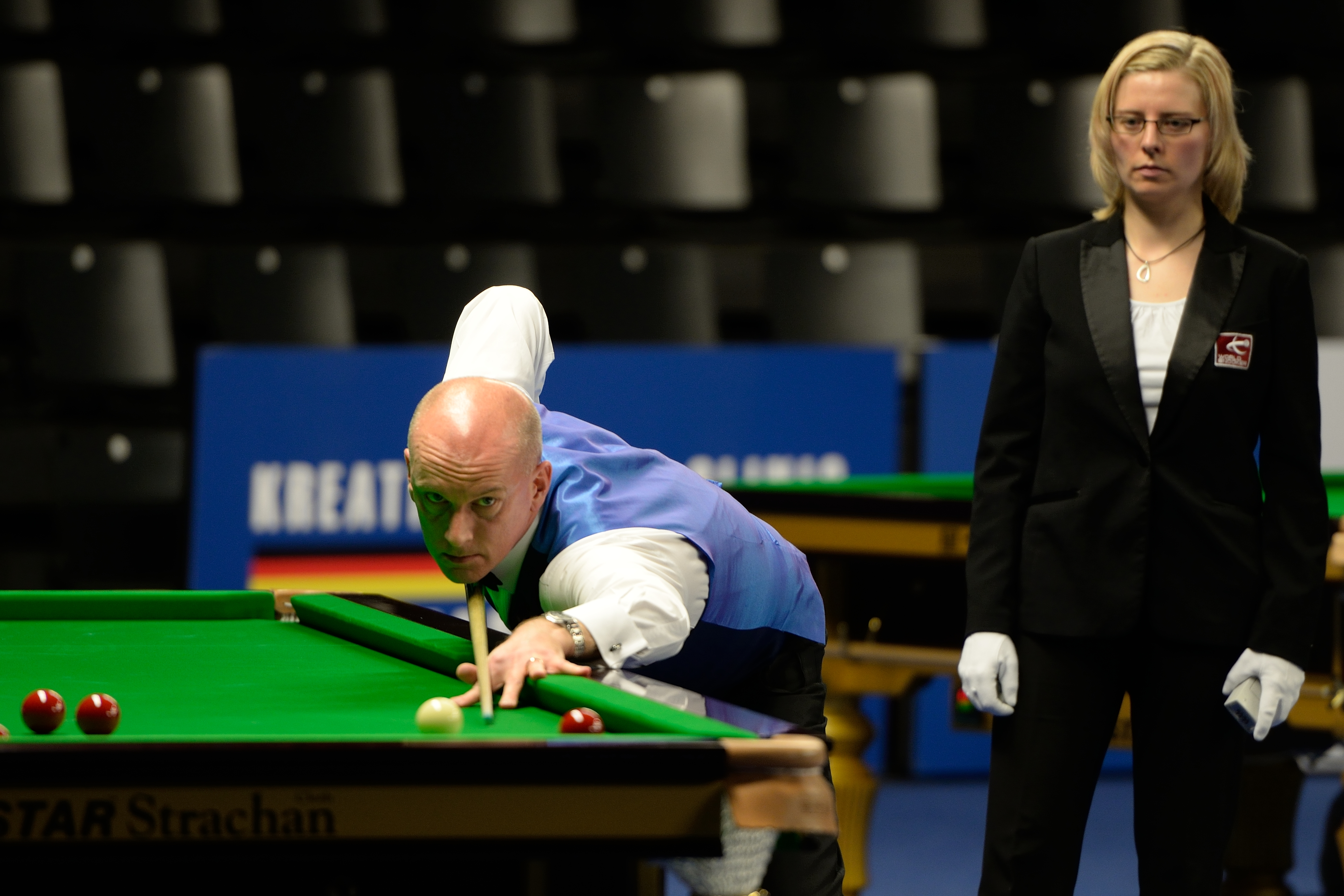
Kesseler (standing) Peter Ebdon (playing), at the 2015 German Masters

Maike Kesseler (born 1 January 1982) is a German snooker referee from Mammendorf near Munich in Bavaria.

Kesseler began her association with snooker in 2005 mainly due to her interest in the sport in Eurosport broadcasts. After an uneventful debut as an amateur player, she opted to become a referee and two years later she passed her referee examination. At first active in Germany in amateur snooker, she refereed the professional 2010 Paul Hunter Classic. Alongside Marcel Eckardt, she was one of the referees who were discovered and promoted by World Snooker and she received invitations to referee at other major professional tournaments. In 2013 she refereed for the first time followed by the 2014, 2015 and 2016 German Masters (her first world ranking final). She also refereed several times at tournaments in the UK. In 2017 she refereed at the 2017 World Cup in Wuxi, China, and the 2017 World Snooker Championship for the first time during the first round finals at the Crucible Theatre where Yan Bingtao faced former world champion Shaun Murphy who won 10–8.

Kesseler referees as a hobby, and works full-time as a customer advisor for a bank. Her husband Jürgen Kesseler is a snooker tournament organiser and former German Bundesliga (snooker) player.

== Major events ==
(As of October 2022)

- 2010 Paul Hunter Classic' (Euro Players Tour Championship 2010/2011)
- 2014 German Masters
- 2015 German Masters
- 2016 German Masters, Final: Martin Gould defeated Luca Brecel 9–5. (Kesseler officiated at her first ranking final).
- 2017 World Cup (snooker), Final: Best of 7 frames. Referee: Maike Kesseler. Wuxi City Sports Park Stadium, Wuxi, China, 9 July 2017. Ding Junhui Liang Wenbo China A 4–3 Judd Trump
- 2017 World Grand Prix, Final: Best of 19 frames. Referee: Maike Kesseler Guild Hall, Preston, England, 12 February 2017. Barry Hawkins (13) England 10–7 Ryan Day (23) Wales
- 2018 German Masters, Final: Best of 17 frames. Referee: Maike Kesseler. Tempodrom, Berlin, Germany, 4 February 2018. Mark Williams Wales 9–1 Graeme Dott Scotland
- 2018 Northern Ireland Open, Final: Best of 17 frames. Referee: Maike Kesseler. Waterfront Hall, Belfast, Northern Ireland, 18 November 2018. Judd Trump (5) England 9–7 Ronnie O'Sullivan
- 2020 European Masters (2019–20 season), Final: Best of 17 frames. Referee: Maike Kesseler. Messe Dornbirn, Dornbirn, Austria, 26 January 2020. Neil Robertson (4) Australia 9–0 Zhou Yuelong (30)
- 2021 UK Championship. Controversy: In the 'Last 64' round on potting the pink ball in frame eight Sam Craigie was awarded the frame by Kesseler while the cue ball was still rolling giving him a 5–3 lead. Craigie then placed his cue on the table and it touched the moving white ball. BBC commentator and 1997 World Snooker Champion Ken Doherty stated that a foul should have been called by the referee, the pink respotted, and Ding allowed to return to the table and attempt to level the match at 4–4; however, the frame had been awarded to Craigie prematurely. Speaking on Eurosport, retired professional snooker player and now commentator Alan McManus also criticised Kesseler for awarding the frame before the cue ball had come to rest. Craigie won the match against three-time UK Championship Ding Junhui 6 - 3, taking £12,000 in prize money. In defence of Kesseler's decision, a World Snooker spokesperson said that the referee has sole discretion for the match.
- 2022 British Open, Final: Best of 19 frames. Referee: Maike Kesseler. 2 October 2022 at the Marshall Arena in Milton Keynes, England. Ryan Day 10–7 Mark Allen

== See also ==
- List of snooker referees
