= Steven Hallworth =

English snooker player (born 1995)

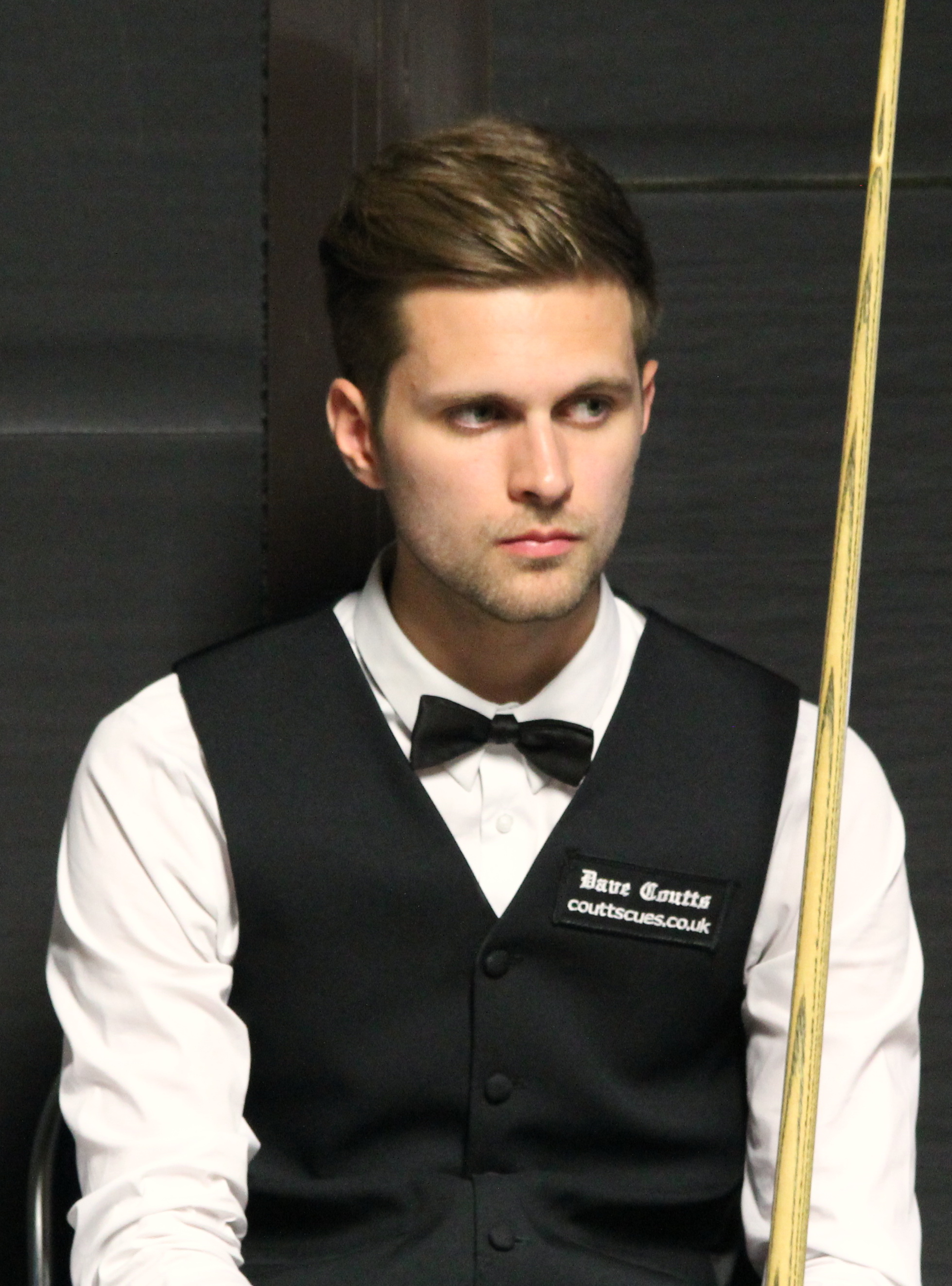
- Hallworth at the 2016 Paul Hunter Classic

Personal information
- Born: 1 December 1995 (age 30) Skellingthorpe, Lincolnshire, England

Sport
- Country: England
- Sport: Snooker
- Professional: 2014–2016, 2020–2022, 2025–present
- Highest ranking: 69 (July–August 2021)
- Current ranking: 74 (as of 26 October 2026)
- Best ranking finish: Semi-final (2023 Snooker Shoot-Out)

Steven Hallworth (born 1 December 1995) is an English professional snooker player. He is the only ever qualified professional from Lincoln. He is a practice partner of Stuart Carrington.

== Career ==
=== Junior ===
Hallworth started playing snooker aged 10 after trying pool on a family holiday. He then found success in junior and amateur levels and was given the opportunity to play future World Champion Mark Selby aged 12 in 2009, after winning that year's Under-17 Lincoln and District Billiards and Snooker Association crown. He was also one 8 finalists in the 2010 Rileys Future Stars competition run by Ronnie O'Sullivan, but lost out to Joel Walker.

=== Amateur ===
Hallworth then progressed on to Players Tour Championship events in 2011 and the 2013 Q School, but it wasn't until the 2013–14 when Hallworth started to progress to the main rounds of PTC events, a 4–3 defeat to Kurt Maflin in the Paul Hunter Classic and a 4–0 loss to former World Champion Mark Williams in the Antwerp Open. It was also Hallworth's televised debut. Hallworth's performances in the EBSA Amateur Cup Events were enough to qualify him for the six-man play-off event, with three players winning two-year professional tour cards on the World Snooker Tour, with a win in the Antwerp event. Hallworth beat Martin Ball 4–1 in the first round, before beating Mitchell Travis 4–3 in the final round to earn place on the tour the 2014–15 and 2015–16 seasons.

=== Professional ===
Hallworth failed to qualify for the opening two ranking events in the 2014–15 season, but did secure his first win as a professional, beating Zak Surety 5–4 in the first qualifying round of the Australian Goldfields Open. All 128 players on the snooker tour automatically play in the first round of the UK Championship and in Hallworth's debut at the venue stage of a ranking event he lost 6–1 to Mark Williams. In the Welsh Open first round he took Shaun Murphy to a deciding frame but lost it to be edged out 4–3. Hallworth led reigning Indian Open champion Michael White 4–0 in the opening round of World Championship qualifying, before losing seven frames in a row and went on to be defeated 10–8. He ended his first season on tour as the world number 116.

A run of 10 consecutive defeats from June 2015 to December was ended when Hallworth overcame Thepchaiya Un-Nooh 5–4 in the German Masters qualifiers. He then beat Andy Hicks 5–4 on the final black to play in a ranking event outside of the United Kingdom for the first time, but was whitewashed 5–0 by world number one Mark Selby. Hallworth dropped off the tour at the end of the season and failed to advance through the 2016 Q School.

=== Return to amateur status ===
Hallworth defeated Hossein Vafaei 4–3 to qualify for the Indian Open and narrowly lost 4–3 to Stuart Bingham in the opening round. The Shoot-Out was upgraded to a ranking event this season and Hallworth made the quarter-finals with wins over Boonyarit Keattikun, Michael White, Daniel Wells and Li Hang. His run came to an end at the hands of Andy Hicks. He whitewashed Darryl Hill 4–0 at the Gibraltar Open, before losing 4–1 to Nigel Bond in the second round. Hallworth was a win away from earning a two-year tour card at the EBSA Play-off, but was bested 4–1 by Gerard Greene.

At the end of the 2017/18 season, he entered the 2018 Q School in an attempt to win back a place on the professional snooker tour. He earnt a credible victory over Zhao Xintong.

In the 2022/23 season, he reached the last 16 of the 2022 British Open, where he lost 3–4 to Robbie Williams.

Hallworth reached the semifinals at the 2023 Snooker Shoot Out, losing to world No. 3 Mark Allen, who went on to win the tournament.

Having dropped off the World Snooker Tour once again, Hallworth regained his professional status by winning the 2025 Q Tour Playoff in Antalya, Turkey, defeating Mark Joyce in the final.

== Performance and rankings timeline ==
Tournament	2011/ 12	2012/ 13	2013/ 14	2014/ 15	2015/ 16	2016/ 17	2017/ 18	2018/ 19	2020/ 21	2021/ 22	2022/ 23	2023/ 24	2024/ 25	2025/ 26	2026/ 27
Ranking (Note: It shows the ranking at the beginning of the season)	(Note: He was an amateur)			(Note: New players on the Main Tour don't have a ranking)	116					69					73
Ranking tournaments
Championship League	Non-Ranking Event								RR	RR	RR	A	RR	RR	RR
China Open	A	A	A	LQ	LQ	A	A	A	Tournament Not Held						LQ
Wuhan Open	Tournament Not Held											A	A	LQ	1R
British Open	Tournament Not Held									1R	3R	LQ	A	LQ	1R
English Open	Tournament Not Held					A	A	2R	3R	2R	A	A	A	LQ	LQ
Shenzhen Open (Note: The event was called the Xi'an Grand Prix (2024/2025–2025/2026))	Tournament Not Held												A	LQ	LQ
Northern Ireland Open	Tournament Not Held					1R	A	A	1R	LQ	LQ	A	A	1R	LQ
International Championship	NH	A	A	LQ	LQ	LQ	A	A	Not Held			A	A	LQ	LQ
UK Championship	A	A	A	1R	1R	A	A	A	1R	1R	A	A	LQ	LQ	
Shoot Out	Non-Ranking Event					QF	A	4R	1R	4R	2R	SF	A	1R	
Scottish Open	NH	MR	Tournament Not Held			A	A	A	2R	1R	A	A	A	1R	LQ
German Masters	A	A	A	LQ	1R	A	A	A	LQ	LQ	A	A	A	LQ	
Welsh Open	A	A	A	1R	1R	A	A	A	1R	LQ	LQ	A	A	LQ	
World Grand Prix	Tournament Not Held			NR	DNQ	DNQ	DNQ	DNQ	DNQ	DNQ	DNQ	DNQ	DNQ	DNQ	
Players Championship (Note: The event was called the Players Tour Championship Grand Final (2011/2012–2015/2016))	DNQ	DNQ	DNQ	DNQ	DNQ	DNQ	DNQ	DNQ	DNQ	DNQ	DNQ	DNQ	DNQ	DNQ	
World Open	A	A	A	Not Held		LQ	A	A	Not Held			LQ	A	1R	
Tour Championship	Tournament Not Held							DNQ	DNQ	DNQ	DNQ	DNQ	DNQ	DNQ	
World Championship	A	A	A	LQ	LQ	A	A	A	LQ	LQ	LQ	A	LQ	LQ	
Former ranking tournaments
Wuxi Classic	A	A	A	LQ	Tournament Not Held										
Australian Goldfields Open	A	A	A	LQ	LQ	Tournament Not Held									
Shanghai Masters	A	A	A	LQ	LQ	A	A	NR	Not Held			Non-Ranking Event			
Riga Masters (Note: The event was called the Riga Open (2014/2015–2015/2016))	Not Held			Minor-Rank		LQ	A	A	Tournament Not Held						
Paul Hunter Classic	Minor-Ranking Event					1R	1R	A	Tournament Not Held						
Indian Open	Not Held		A	LQ	NH	1R	A	LQ	Tournament Not Held						
WST Pro Series	Tournament Not Held								RR	Tournament Not Held					
Turkish Masters	Tournament Not Held									LQ	Tournament Not Held				
Gibraltar Open	Tournament Not Held				MR	2R	LQ	A	1R	2R	Tournament Not Held				
WST Classic	Tournament Not Held										2R	Tournament Not Held			
European Masters	Tournament Not Held					LQ	A	A	1R	LQ	1R	LQ	Not Held		
Saudi Arabia Masters	Tournament Not Held												A	5R	NH

Performance Table Legend
LQ	lost in the qualifying draw	#R	lost in the early rounds of the tournament (WR = Wildcard round, RR = Round robin)	QF	lost in the quarter-finals
SF	lost in the semi-finals	F	lost in the final	W	won the tournament
DNQ	did not qualify for the tournament	A	did not participate in the tournament	WD	withdrew from the tournament

NH / Not Held	means an event was not held.
NR / Non-Ranking Event	means an event is/was no longer a ranking event.
R / Ranking Event	means an event is/was a ranking event.
MR / Minor-Ranking Event	means an event is/was a minor-ranking event.

== Career finals ==
=== Amateur finals: 6 (5 titles) ===
Outcome	No.	Year	Championship	Opponent in the final	Score
Winner	1.	2017	English Amateur Tour - Event 6 (2016–2017)	(England) Adam Edge	4–2
Runner-up	1.	2017	English Amateur Tour - Event 2 (2017–2018)	(England) Joe O'Connor	2–4
Winner	2.	2019	English Amateur Tour - Event 4 (2018–2019)	(England) Zak Surety	4–3
Winner	3.	2023	English Amateur Tour - Event 1 (2023–2024)	(England) Ryan Davies	4–3
Winner	4.	2023	English Amateur Tour - Event 2 (2023–2024)	(England) Kuldesh Johal	4–3
Winner	5.	2024	English Amateur Championship	(England) Callum Downing	6–4
