= 2017 World Grand Prix (snooker) =

Snooker tournament

2017 Ladbrokes World Grand Prix
Tournament information
- Dates: 6–12 February 2017
- Venue: Preston Guild Hall
- City: Preston
- Country: England
- Organisation: World Snooker
- Format: Ranking event
- Total prize fund: £375,000
- Winner's share: £100,000
- Highest break: Judd Trump (ENG) (145)

Final
- Champion: Barry Hawkins (ENG)
- Runner-up: Ryan Day (WAL)
- Score: 10–7

The 2017 World Grand Prix (officially the 2017 Ladbrokes World Grand Prix) was a professional ranking snooker tournament that took place between 6 and 12 February 2017 at the Guild Hall in Preston, England. It was the third staging of the tournament and the thirteenth ranking event of the 2016/2017 season. The tournament was broadcast in the UK on ITV4.

Shaun Murphy was the defending champion, but lost 2–4 in the quarter-finals to Ryan Day, who went on to reach the final. Barry Hawkins beat Day 10–7 to win his third ranking title.

== Prize fund ==
The breakdown of prize money for this year is shown below:

- Winner: £100,000
- Runner-up: £40,000
- Semi-final: £20,000
- Quarter-final: £12,500
- Last 16: £7,500
- Last 32: £5,000
- Highest break: £5,000
- Total: £375,000

The "rolling 147 prize" for a maximum break stood at £5,000.

== Seeding list ==
The top 32 players on a one-year ranking list running from the 2016 Riga Masters until the 2017 German Masters qualified for the tournament.

Rank	Player	Total points
1	(England) Mark Selby	375,150
2	(China) Ding Junhui	170,000
3	(England) Ali Carter	162,025
4	(England) Judd Trump	161,750
5	(England) Ronnie O'Sullivan	143,750
6	(Hong Kong) Marco Fu	130,150
7	(Scotland) John Higgins	118,500
8	(China) Liang Wenbo	117,400
9	(England) Anthony Hamilton	106,525
10	(England) Stuart Bingham	106,087
11	(Scotland) Anthony McGill	99,275
12	(Australia) Neil Robertson	96,125
13	(England) Barry Hawkins	93,500
14	(England) Mark King	92,800
15	(England) Shaun Murphy	87,625
16	(England) Joe Perry	77,050
17	(Wales) Mark Williams	73,750
18	(England) Michael Holt	72,025
19	(Scotland) Stephen Maguire	63,500
20	(England) Kyren Wilson	63,025
21	(England) Ricky Walden	55,900
22	(England) David Gilbert	55,650
23	(Wales) Ryan Day	54,362
24	(Northern Ireland) Mark Allen	51,725
25	(Wales) Dominic Dale	47,125
26	(Wales) Michael White	44,725
27	(Wales) Jamie Jones	43,862
28	(China) Yan Bingtao	43,600
29	(England) Tom Ford	43,525
30	(China) Zhou Yuelong	42,550
31	(China) Yu Delu	40,625
32	(England) Martin Gould	40,550

== Main draw ==
Last 32; Best of 7 frames
1	(England) Mark Selby	3
32	(England) Martin Gould	4
16	(England) Joe Perry	4
17	(Wales) Mark Williams	2
9	(England) Anthony Hamilton	0
24	(Northern Ireland) Mark Allen	4
25	(Wales) Dominic Dale	0
8	(China) Liang Wenbo	4
5	(England) Ronnie O'Sullivan	4
28	(China) Yan Bingtao	2
21	(England) Ricky Walden	2
12	(Australia) Neil Robertson	4
13	(England) Barry Hawkins	4
20	(England) Kyren Wilson	2
29	(England) Tom Ford	2
4	(England) Judd Trump	4
3	(England) Ali Carter	4
30	(China) Zhou Yuelong	3
19	(Scotland) Stephen Maguire	3
14	(England) Mark King	4
11	(Scotland) Anthony McGill	4
22	(England) David Gilbert	1
27	(Wales) Jamie Jones	2
6	(Hong Kong) Marco Fu	4
7	(Scotland) John Higgins	3
26	(Wales) Michael White	4
23	(Wales) Ryan Day	4
10	(England) Stuart Bingham	2
15	(England) Shaun Murphy	4
18	(England) Michael Holt	1
31	(China) Yu Delu	2
2	(China) Ding Junhui	4

Last 16; Best of 7 frames
32	(England) Martin Gould	3
16	(England) Joe Perry	4
24	(Northern Ireland) Mark Allen	3
8	(China) Liang Wenbo	4
5	(England) Ronnie O'Sullivan	1
12	(Australia) Neil Robertson	4
13	(England) Barry Hawkins	4
4	(England) Judd Trump	1
3	(England) Ali Carter	3
14	(England) Mark King	4
11	(Scotland) Anthony McGill	2
6	(Hong Kong) Marco Fu	4
26	(Wales) Michael White	2
23	(Wales) Ryan Day	4
15	(England) Shaun Murphy	4
2	(China) Ding Junhui	3

Quarter-finals; Best of 7 frames
16	(England) Joe Perry	3
8	(China) Liang Wenbo	4
12	(Australia) Neil Robertson	2
13	(England) Barry Hawkins	4
14	(England) Mark King	2
6	(Hong Kong) Marco Fu	4
23	(Wales) Ryan Day	4
15	(England) Shaun Murphy	2

Semi-finals; Best of 11 frames
8	(China) Liang Wenbo	1
13	(England) Barry Hawkins	6
6	(Hong Kong) Marco Fu	4
23	(Wales) Ryan Day	6

Final; Best of 19 frames
13	(England) Barry Hawkins	10
23	(Wales) Ryan Day	7

== Final ==
Final: Best of 19 frames. Referee: Maike Kesseler; Guild Hall, Preston, England, 12 February 2017.
Barry Hawkins (13); England	10–7	Ryan Day (23); Wales
Afternoon: 44–80 (55), 87–1 (53), 121–7 (114), 132–9 (102), 39–68, 129–0 (129), 1–69 (54), 145–0 (141), 97–6 (97); Evening: 128–0 (128), 89–0 (85), 65–4, 14–108 (87), 0–84 (84), 0–96 (92), 1–75 (75), 67–56
141	Highest break	92
5	Century breaks	0
8	50+ breaks	6

== Century breaks ==
Total: 25

- 145, 107 – Judd Trump
- 142 – Martin Gould
- 141, 129, 128, 120, 114, 106, 102 – Barry Hawkins
- 140 – Mark Allen
- 137, 128 – Ronnie O'Sullivan
- 134 – Ryan Day
- 129, 109 – Liang Wenbo
- 125, 123, 114, 105, 102 – Marco Fu
- 122 – Joe Perry
- 121 – Jamie Jones
- 108 – Neil Robertson
- 102 – Tom Ford
