= Ryan Day (snooker player) =

Welsh snooker player (born 1980)

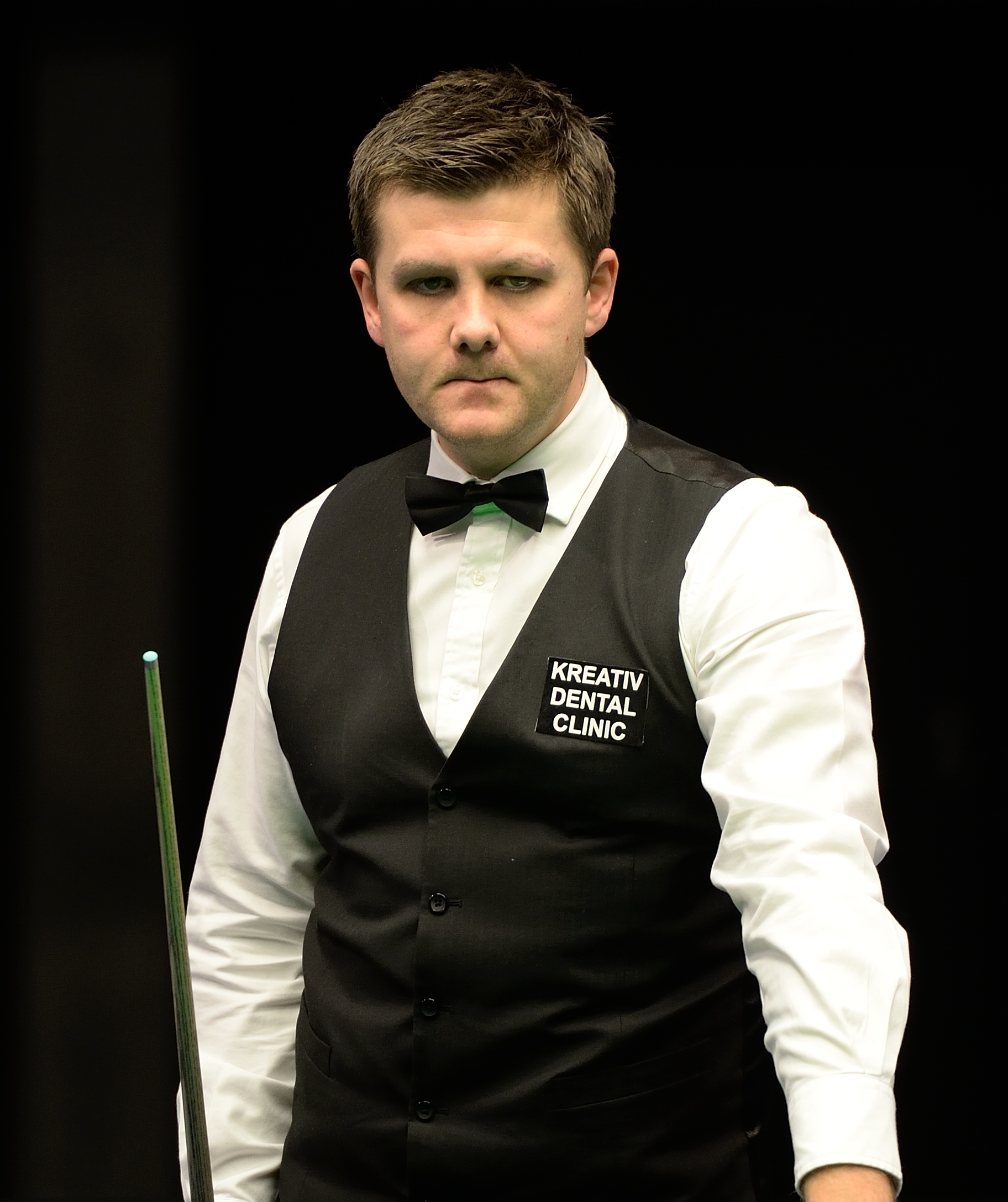
- Day at the 2015 German Masters

Personal information
- Nickname: Dynamite
- Born: 23 March 1980 (age 46) Pontycymer, Bridgend, Wales

Sport
- Country: Wales
- Sport: Snooker
- Professional: 1999–2001, 2002–present
- Highest ranking: 6 (2009/10)
- Current ranking: 42 (as of 7 November 2026)
- Maximum breaks: 4
- Century breaks: 493 (as of 16 November 2026)

Tournament wins
- Ranking: 4

Ryan Day (born 23 March 1980) is a Welsh professional snooker player. He is a prolific break-builder, having compiled over 450 century breaks, including four maximum breaks. He is a three-time World Championship quarter-finalist, has been ranked at no. 6 in the world and has won four ranking tournaments.

== Career ==
=== Early career ===
Day was born in Pontycymer, Bridgend. A top amateur, he reached the final of the IBSF Championship in China in November 1998 but lost on the final black.

Day began his professional career by playing UK Tour in 1998, at the time the second-level professional tour. He was named Young Player of Distinction of the season 2000/2001 by the World Professional Billiards and Snooker Association (WPBSA). He won the 2001 Benson & Hedges Championship. With this win, he qualified for the 2002 Masters, where he defeated Dave Harold, before losing 0–6 to Stephen Hendry. He also won the WPBSA Challenge Tour in the 2001/2002 season and was named WPBSA Newcomer of the Year in 2002. Due to problems with his liver in 2003, his results suffered badly.

In 2004, however, he qualified for the World Snooker Championship and he led John Higgins 9–7 in the first round, becoming the first player to score three centuries in his first Crucible match, but missed a pink in the 17th frame that would have left Higgins needing a snooker to stay in the tournament. Higgins went on to win the frame and the next two for the match. As some consolation, Higgins commented that Day was "going to be a top player for many years to come".

=== 2005–2011 ===
Day reached the quarter-finals of his home tournament, the 2005 Welsh Open defeating Ali Carter and Steve Davis along the way. He finished this season ranked 33, but as Quinten Hann did not participate in any events, Day was among the top 32 seeds.

In the 2006, he beat Joe Perry 10–3 in the first round and led Ronnie O'Sullivan 9–7 in the second round before losing 10–13. He narrowly missed reaching the top 16 of the rankings as a result.

The 2006/2007 season was the most successful of his career up till then. Day reached the quarter-finals of the 2006 Northern Ireland Trophy and was runner up in the 2007 Malta Cup, losing 4–9 to Shaun Murphy. That year's performance saw him ranked 16 in the world for the 2007/2008 season, one place higher than in the previous year. As a member of the Top 16, he automatically qualified for tournaments.

Day's 2007/2008 season started with an appearance in the final of the Shanghai Masters; Day led his practise partner Dominic Dale 6–2 after the first session, but eventually succumbed to a 6–10 defeat. After failing to progress past the last 16 in the next three tournaments, he reached the semi-finals of the China Open, beating Matthew Stevens, Ken Doherty and Mark Williams before he was beaten by Stephen Maguire 5–6, denying him a place in the final. Day made it through to the quarter-finals of the World Championship for the first time in his career by beating Irishman Michael Judge 10–6 and the defending champion John Higgins 13–9 in one of the best wins of his career, before losing 7–13 to Stephen Hendry. His consistent performances took him up to 8th place in the rankings.

Day reached the final of the 2008 Grand Prix where he lost to John Higgins, defeating Ricky Walden, Mark Selby, Jamie Cope and Ali Carter. The year ended on a disappointing note when he lost in the first round at the UK Championship to Matthew Stevens. He again reached the World Championship quarter-finals in 2009, before losing 11–13 to Mark Allen. However, he continued to move up the rankings, climbing two places to number 6, the highest ranked player not to have won a ranking event.

A disappointing 2009–10 season in which he reached only one quarter-final (in the Welsh Open), culminated in an 8–10 first round defeat in the World Championship to Mark Davis. This continued into the next season where he made a number of early exits which meant that at the first revision under the new ranking system he dropped out of the top 16, down to number 20.

=== 2011/2012 season ===
Day qualified for five of the eight ranking tournaments during the 2011–12 season, but lost in the first round in four of them. His best performance came at the end of the season in the biggest event on the tournament calendar, the World Championship. He came back from 3–7 down in his qualifying match against Gerard Greene to win 10–8, to set up a first round match with China's number 1, Ding Junhui. Day produced another comeback, this time from trailing 6–9 to win the last four frames and advance to the second round. There he beat fellow qualifier Cao Yupeng 13–7 and held a 5–2 lead in the early stages of his quarter-final match against compatriot Matthew Stevens. However, he suffered a migraine at the start of the next session and went on to lose 11 consecutive frames to exit the tournament 5–13. Day finished the season ranked world number 30.

=== 2012/2013 season ===
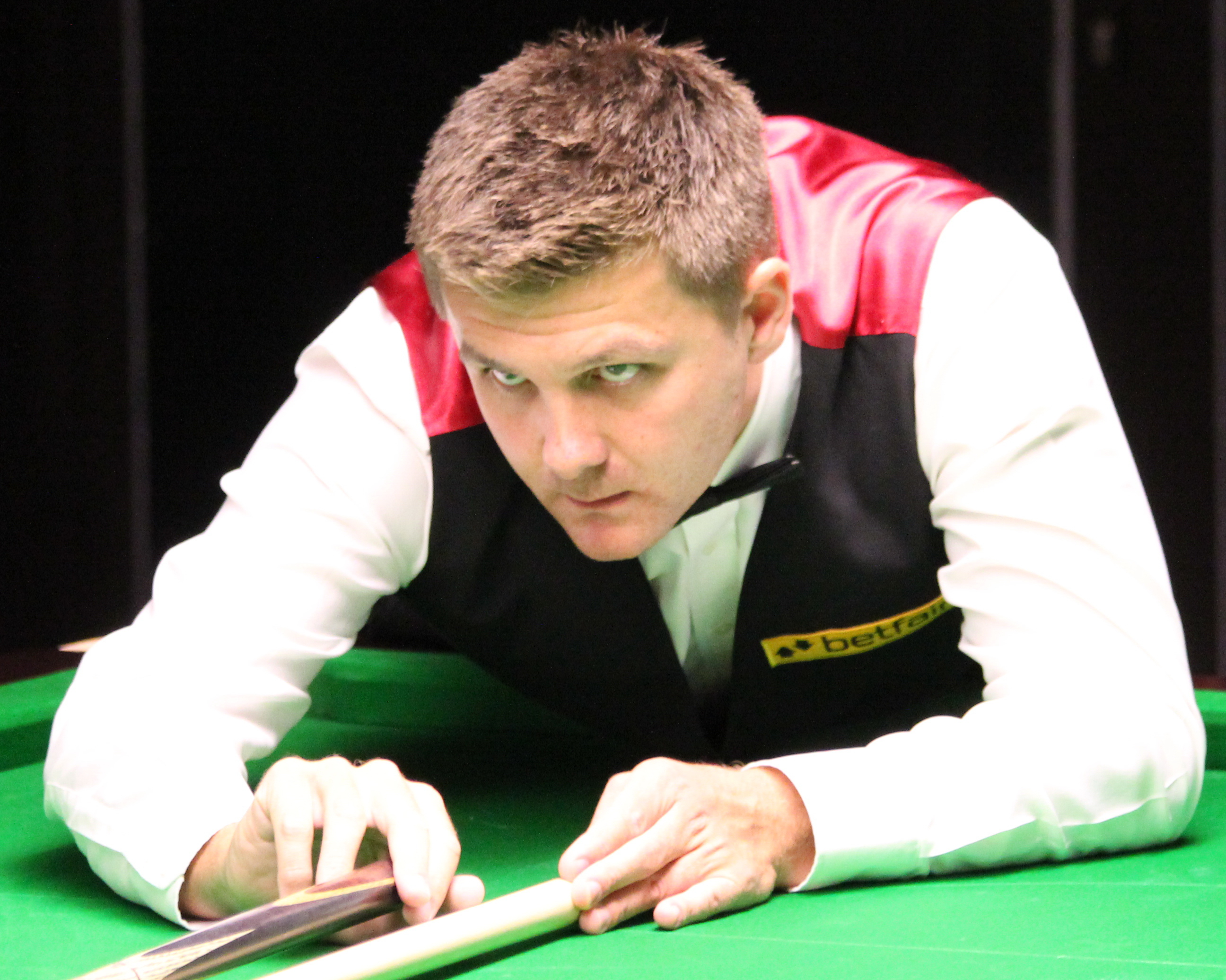
2012 Paul Hunter Classic

Day lost in qualifying for the opening ranking event of the 2012–13 season the Wuxi Classic 0–5 to Robert Milkins. He was then beaten in the second round of the Australian Goldfields Open and the Shanghai Masters, 3–5 to Matthew Selt and 0–5 to John Higgins respectively. Day was defeated 3–6 by Neil Robertson in the opening round of the International Championship, but then came perhaps the best result of his season at the UK Championship. He beat Ding Junhui 6–4 in a high quality first round encounter, before letting a 3–0 lead against world number two Mark Selby slip to lose 4–6. Day played in nine of the ten minor-ranking Players Tour Championship events during the season with his best results being two quarter-final defeats to be ranked 32nd on the Order of Merit, just outside the top 26 who qualified for the Finals. Day struggled in the second half of the season as he failed to qualify for four of the remaining five ranking events, losing 2–5 in the first round of the World Open to Mark Allen in the one he did reach. He failed to qualify for the World Championship for the first time since 2006, narrowly losing to Ben Woollaston 9–10 in the fourth and final qualifying round. He finished the season ranked world number 31.

=== 2013/2014 season ===
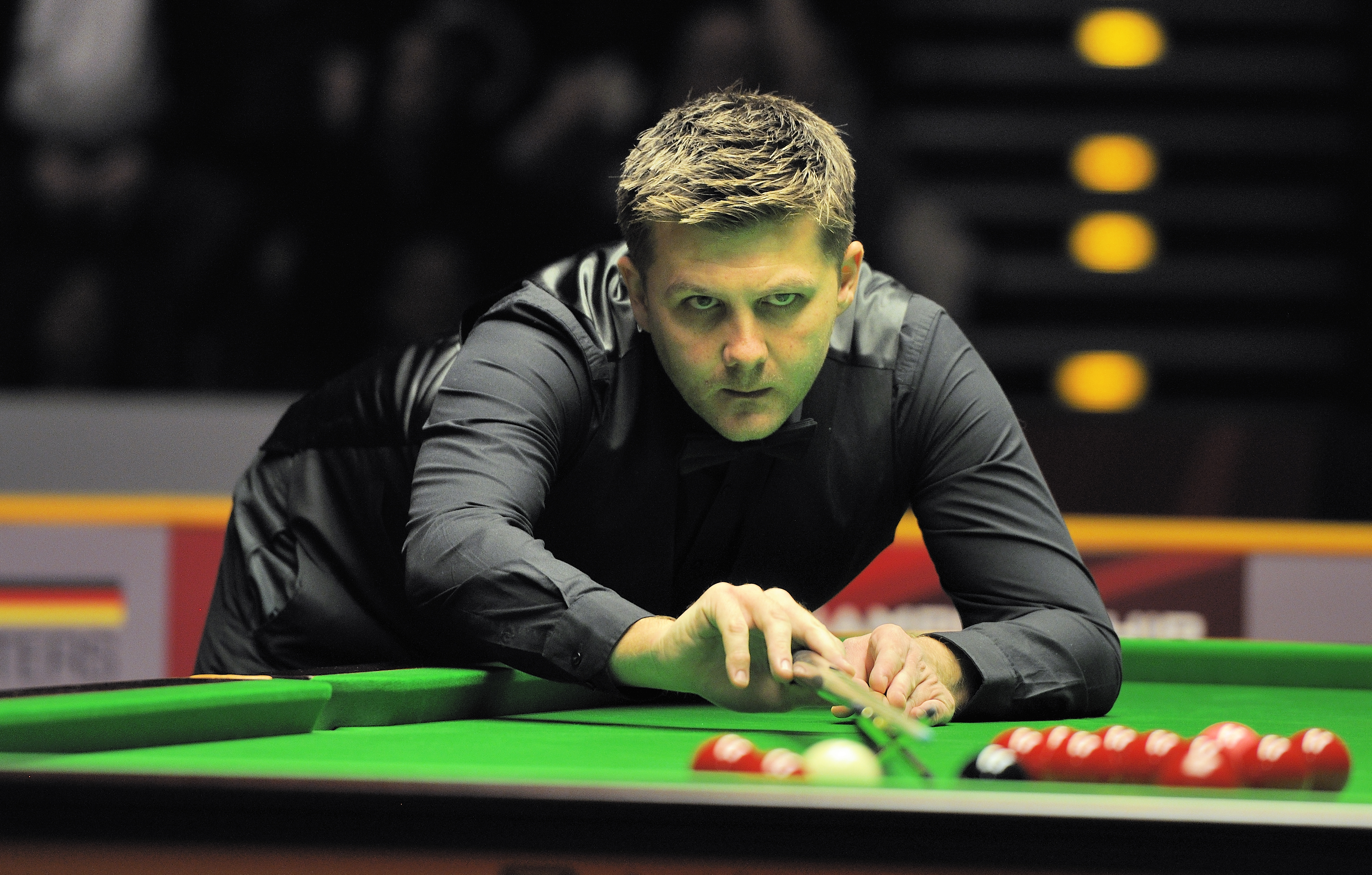
2014 German Masters

Day was beaten in the second round once and first round three times in the opening four ranking events of the 2013–14 season, but then reached the quarter-finals for the first time in over a year at the International Championship. Day won the first frame against Joe Perry but was thrashed 6–1. He went a stage further at the German Masters and, in an attempt to play in his first ranking final since 2008, he came from 3–5 down against Ding Junhui to level the match, but lost the deciding frame. A trio of second round losses and a first round defeat in the China Open followed. At the World Championship, Stephen Maguire levelled the scores from 4–8 and 6–9 down in the first round, but Day won the final frame for a final score of 10–9, and advanced to the second round. His season then ended when he lost 7–13 to Judd Trump, but he did increase his ranking by 10 places to world number 21, his highest finish for four years.

=== 2014/2015 season ===
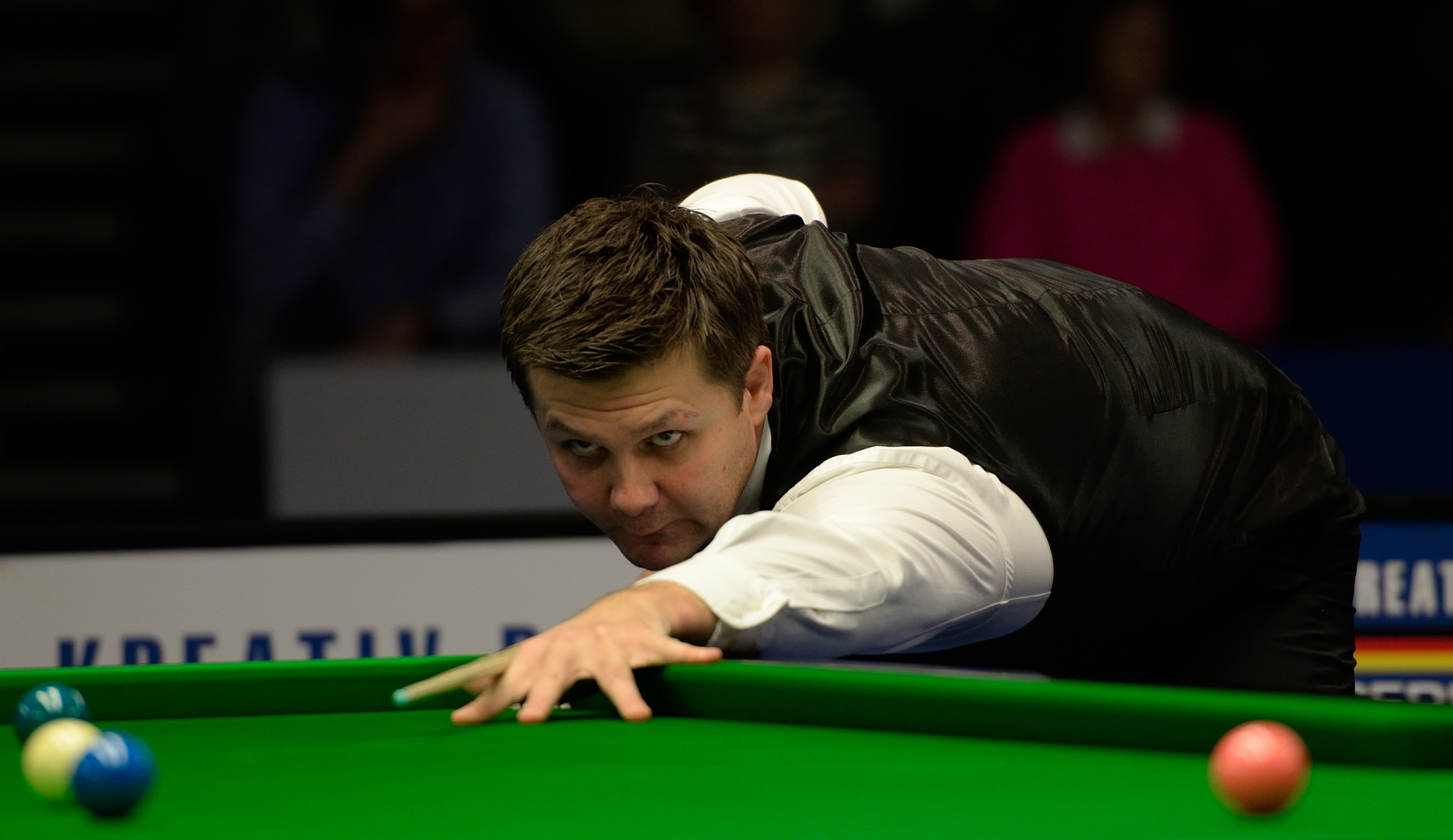
2015 German Masters

For the second season in a row Day qualified for every ranking event. A pair of last 16 defeats at the Wuxi Classic and Shanghai Masters proved to be his best results in the first half of the year. At the Haining City Open he achieved his first official maximum break in his last 32 match against Cao Yupeng. Day would go on to reach the quarter-finals, but lost 2–4 to Oliver Lines. After Day won the final two frames of his first round match against world number one Ding Junhui at the German Masters to eliminate him 5–4, he said that he was working on his consistency to get back into the highest echelons of the game. He then beat Alfie Burden 5–2 to face Liang Wenbo in Day's only quarter-final appearance of the season and was narrowly beaten 5–4. In Day's home event, he suffered a surprise 1–4 loss to amateur Oliver Brown in the second round of the Welsh Open. Day was 3–1 ahead of Mark Allen in the first round of the World Championship, but then lost nine successive frames to be knocked out 10–3.

=== 2015/2016 season ===
Day lost 4–5 to Ding Junhui in the second round of the Shanghai Masters, but turned the tables at the same stage of the International Championship by beating him 6–5. Day was defeated 4–6 by David Gilbert in the following round. However, in his next event he whitewashed Mark Selby 4–0 in the quarter-finals of the Bulgarian Open and beat Sam Baird 4–2 to play in the final of an event carrying ranking points for the first time since 2008, but he was thrashed 4–0 by Mark Allen. He lost 2–6 to Dechawat Poomjaeng in the second round of the UK Championship, but knocked out reigning world champion Stuart Bingham 5–3 to reach the quarter-finals of the German Masters. Day lost the final three frames against Kyren Wilson to be eliminated 4–5. He made two centuries and won the deciding frame on the final black against John Higgins to make another quarter-final at the World Grand Prix. He was defeated 2–4 by Bingham, losing the final frame from 56–0 points up, after Bingham made a 64 break. After being defeated 3–10 by Higgins in the opening round of the World Championship, Day said he would be working on his fitness in the off season in an attempt to improve his concentration during matches.

=== 2016/2017 season ===
Day advanced to the quarter-final stage of the Shanghai Masters by overcoming Neil Robertson and Mei Xiwen, both 5–2, before losing 3–5 to Mark Selby. He won the first four frames against Mark Allen in the third round of the UK Championship, but went on to lose 6–5. His second quarter-final of the season came at the German Masters and he was defeated 2–5 by Martin Gould. At the World Grand Prix, Day overcame Stuart Bingham, Michael White and Shaun Murphy all 4–2. In the semi-finals he was 3–4 down to Marco Fu, but recovered from needing four snookers in the eighth frame to level and went on to win 6–4. In Day's first ranking event final since 2008 he was 9–3 behind Barry Hawkins and, though he pulled it back to 9–7, he was defeated 7–10. Day lost in the final of the non-ranking Championship League 0–3 to John Higgins. A 4–2 win over Neil Robertson saw Day play in the semi-finals of the Gibraltar Open and he was beaten 4–2 by Judd Trump after leading 2–0. Day was a seeded player for the World Championship, but lost 4–10 Xiao Guodong in the first round and once again blamed his lack of concentration for the early exit.

=== 2017/2018 season ===
Day finally clinched his maiden ranking title in his fifth final appearance. The Welshman defeated Stephen Maguire 5–2 to claim the Riga Masters title. The Welshman sensationally stormed to consecutive titles at the 2018 Gibraltar Open and the 2018 Romanian Masters. He defeated Cao Yupeng and Stuart Bingham in the respective finals. Day reached the semi-final in the UK Championship, this was his first appearance in the semi-finals of a Triple Crown event, but he lost 3–6 to Shaun Murphy in the semi-final. Day also made a return to the Masters for the first time since 2010. He beat Ding Junhui 6–4 in the first round, but lost 1–6 to John Higgins in the quarter final.

=== 2018/2019 season ===
In the Gibraltar Open, Day reached the final again by beating Lukas Kleckers, Noppon Saengkham, Elliot Slessor, David Grace, David Gilbert, and Lu Ning. But he was unable to defend the title as he lost 1–4 to Stuart Bingham in the final. Day qualified for the Masters again this season. He knocked John Higgins out in the first round, winning by 6–5. But he was defeated by Ronnie O'Sullivan in the next round, losing 3–6.

=== 2020/2021 season ===
Day secured his third ranking title by beating Mark Selby in the final of the Shoot Out. In April 2021, he failed to qualify for the World Snooker Championship after losing 5–10 to Ricky Walden in the final qualifying round.

== Personal life ==
Day married his stepmother's sister, Lynsey, in the summer of 2008. The couple have two daughters, Francesca, born in 2006 and Lauren, in 2010. His younger brother Rhys played football for Mansfield Town amongst others and played in Wales' under-21 side.

== Performance and rankings timeline ==
Tournament	1997/ 98	1998/ 99	1999/ 00	2000/ 01	2001/ 02	2002/ 03	2003/ 04	2004/ 05	2005/ 06	2006/ 07	2007/ 08	2008/ 09	2009/ 10	2010/ 11	2011/ 12	2012/ 13	2013/ 14	2014/ 15	2015/ 16	2016/ 17	2017/ 18	2018/ 19	2019/ 20		2020/ 21	2021/ 22	2022/ 23	2023/ 24	2024/ 25	2025/ 26	2026/ 27
Ranking (Note: It shows the ranking at the beginning of the season)	(Note: He was an amateur)		(Note: New players don't have a ranking)	124			69	45	33	17	16	8	6	12	28	30	31	21	20	23	19	16	18		37	28	28	15	18	37	37
Ranking tournaments
Championship League	Tournament Not Held										Non-Ranking Event														2R	3R	RR	RR	2R	RR	RR
China Open (Note: The event was called the China International (1997/1998–1998/1999))	NR	A	LQ	LQ	A	Not Held		2R	LQ	LQ	SF	SF	2R	2R	LQ	LQ	1R	2R	2R	LQ	LQ	1R	Tournament Not Held								LQ
Wuhan Open	Tournament Not Held																											2R	1R	WD	1R
British Open	A	A	LQ	LQ	A	LQ	LQ	1R	Tournament Not Held																	1R	W	2R	1R	LQ	LQ
English Open	Tournament Not Held																			4R	1R	QF	2R		2R	LQ	3R	1R	1R	1R	LQ
Shenzhen Open (Note: The event was called the Xi'an Grand Prix (2024/2025–2025/2026))	Tournament Not Held																												2R	1R	LQ
Northern Ireland Open	Tournament Not Held																			1R	4R	QF	1R		3R	1R	LQ	LQ	1R	2R	2R
International Championship	Tournament Not Held															1R	QF	2R	3R	1R	2R	2R	1R		Not Held			3R	2R	1R	2R
UK Championship	A	A	LQ	LQ	A	LQ	LQ	2R	1R	2R	1R	1R	1R	2R	1R	2R	1R	2R	2R	3R	SF	1R	2R		WD	1R	2R	LQ	1R	1R	
Shoot Out	Tournament Not Held													Non-Ranking Event						1R	1R	A	2R		W	1R	1R	3R	2R	3R	
Scottish Open (Note: The event was called the Players Championship (2003/2004))	A	A	LQ	2R	A	1R	2R	Tournament Not Held								MR	Not Held			2R	1R	QF	2R		1R	2R	2R	1R	2R	1R	
German Masters (Note: The event was called the German Open (1997/1998))	A	NR	Tournament Not Held											1R	1R	LQ	SF	QF	QF	QF	QF	1R	LQ		1R	QF	LQ	QF	1R	1R	LQ
Welsh Open	A	A	3R	LQ	A	LQ	LQ	QF	3R	1R	3R	1R	QF	2R	LQ	LQ	2R	2R	3R	2R	1R	1R	1R		3R	3R	LQ	2R	3R	1R	
World Grand Prix	Tournament Not Held																	NR	QF	F	1R	1R	DNQ		DNQ	DNQ	2R	DNQ	DNQ	DNQ	
Players Championship (Note: The event was called the Players Tour Championship Grand Final (2010/2011–2015/2016))	Tournament Not Held													DNQ	DNQ	DNQ	2R	1R	2R	1R	QF	DNQ	DNQ		1R	DNQ	QF	DNQ	DNQ	DNQ	
World Open (Note: The event was called the Grand Prix (1997/1998–2000/2001 and 2004/2005–2009/2010) and the LG Cup (2001/2002–2003/2004))	A	A	LQ	LQ	A	2R	LQ	1R	1R	2R	2R	F	1R	LQ	LQ	1R	2R	Not Held		3R	2R	2R	LQ		Not Held			1R	3R	QF	
Tour Championship	Tournament Not Held																					DNQ	DNQ		DNQ	DNQ	QF	DNQ	DNQ	DNQ	
World Championship	LQ	LQ	LQ	LQ	LQ	LQ	1R	LQ	2R	1R	QF	QF	1R	1R	QF	LQ	2R	1R	1R	1R	1R	LQ	LQ		LQ	LQ	1R	2R	1R	LQ	
Non-ranking tournaments
Shanghai Masters	Tournament Not Held										Ranking Event											QF	A		Not Held			A	A	A	
Champion of Champions	Tournament Not Held																A	A	A	A	QF	1R	A		A	QF	QF	A	A	A	
The Masters	LQ	A	LQ	LQ	1R	LQ	LQ	A	LQ	LQ	1R	1R	QF	A	A	A	A	A	A	A	QF	QF	A		A	A	1R	A	A	A	
Championship League	Tournament Not Held										SF	RR	RR	2R	RR	RR	2R	RR	RR	F	RR	RR	RR	3R	A	RR	RR	RR	RR	RR	
Former ranking tournaments
Malta Grand Prix	Non-Ranking		LQ	NR	Tournament Not Held																										
Thailand Masters	A	A	LQ	LQ	A	NR	Not Held			NR	Tournament Not Held																				
Irish Masters	Non-Ranking Event					WD	LQ	LQ	NH	NR	Tournament Not Held																				
Northern Ireland Trophy	Tournament Not Held								NR	QF	3R	3R	Tournament Not held																		
Bahrain Championship	Tournament Not Held											2R	Tournament Not Held																		
Wuxi Classic (Note: The event was called the Jiangsu Classic (2008/2009–2009/2010))	Tournament Not Held											Non-Ranking Event				LQ	1R	3R	Tournament Not Held												
Australian Goldfields Open	Tournament Not Held														1R	2R	1R	1R	A	Tournament Not Held											
Shanghai Masters	Tournament Not Held										F	QF	QF	1R	1R	2R	2R	2R	2R	QF	1R	Non-Ranking			Not Held			Non-Ranking Event			
Paul Hunter Classic (Note: The event was called the Grand Prix Fürth (2004/2005) and the Fürth German Open (2005/2006–2006/2007))	Tournament Not Held							Pro-am Event						Minor-Ranking Event						2R	A	A	NR		Tournament Not Held						
Indian Open	Tournament Not Held																1R	1R	NH	1R	A	A	Tournament Not Held								
Riga Masters (Note: The event was called the Riga Open (2014/2015–2015/2016))	Tournament Not Held																	Minor-Rank		1R	W	1R	LQ		Tournament Not Held						
China Championship	Tournament Not Held																			NR	2R	2R	2R		Tournament Not Held						
WST Pro Series	Tournament Not Held																								2R	Tournament Not Held					
Turkish Masters	Tournament Not Held																									LQ	Tournament Not Held				
Gibraltar Open	Tournament Not Held																		MR	SF	W	F	2R		1R	2R	Tournament Not Held				
WST Classic	Tournament Not Held																										1R	Tournament Not Held			
European Masters (Note: The event was called the Irish Open (1998/1999), the European Open (2001/2002–2003/2004) and the Malta Cup (2004/2005–2007/2008))	NH	A	Not Held		A	LQ	LQ	1R	LQ	F	NR	Tournament Not Held								LQ	1R	QF	LQ		2R	QF	3R	LQ	Not Held		
Saudi Arabia Masters	Tournament Not Held																												4R	3R	NH
Former non-ranking tournaments
Malta Cup	Tournament Not Held				Ranking Event						RR	Tournament Not Held								Ranking Event									Not Held		
World Series Grand Final	Tournament Not Held											2R	Tournament Not Held																		
Masters Qualifying Event (Note: The event was called the Benson & Hedges Championship (1993/1994-2002/2003))	LQ	A	LQ	QF	W	LQ	2R	NH	3R	QF	A	A	A	Tournament Not Held																	
Beijing International Challenge	Tournament Not Held												A	F	Tournament Not Held																
Wuxi Classic	Tournament Not Held											SF	RR	QF	A	Ranking Event			Tournament Not Held												
World Grand Prix	Tournament Not Held																	1R	Ranking Event												
Shoot Out	Tournament Not Held													3R	3R	2R	SF	1R	QF	Ranking Event											
Romanian Masters	Tournament Not Held																				W	Tournament Not Held									
Macau Masters	Tournament Not Held																					RR	Tournament Not Held								
Six-red World Championship (Note: The event was called the Six-red Snooker International (2008/2009) and the Six-red World Grand Prix (2009/2010))	Tournament Not Held											A	3R	A	NH	A	A	2R	3R	3R	2R	2R	RR		Not Held		LQ	Tournament Not Held			

Performance Table Legend
LQ	lost in the qualifying draw	#R	lost in the early rounds of the tournament (WR = Wildcard round, RR = Round robin)	QF	lost in the quarter-finals
SF	lost in the semi-finals	F	lost in the final	W	won the tournament
DNQ	did not qualify for the tournament	A	did not participate in the tournament	WD	withdrew from the tournament

NH / Not Held	means an event was not held.
NR / Non-Ranking Event	means an event is/was no longer a ranking event.
R / Ranking Event	means an event is/was a ranking event.
MR / Minor-Ranking Event	means an event is/was a minor-ranking event.
PA / Pro-am Event	means an event is/was a pro-am event.

== Career finals ==
=== Ranking finals: 9 (4 titles) ===
Outcome	No.	Year	Championship	Opponent in the final	Score
Runner-up	1.	2007	Malta Cup	(England) Shaun Murphy	4–9
Runner-up	2.	2007	Shanghai Masters	(Wales) Dominic Dale	6–10
Runner-up	3.	2008	Grand Prix	(Scotland) John Higgins	7–9
Runner-up	4.	2017	World Grand Prix	(England) Barry Hawkins	7–10
Winner	1.	2017	Riga Masters	(Scotland) Stephen Maguire	5–2
Winner	2.	2018	Gibraltar Open	(China) Cao Yupeng	4–0
Runner-up	5.	2019	Gibraltar Open	(England) Stuart Bingham	1–4
Winner	3.	2021	Snooker Shoot Out	(England) Mark Selby	1–0
Winner	4.	2022	British Open	(Northern Ireland) Mark Allen	10–7

=== Minor-ranking finals: 1 ===
Outcome	No.	Year	Championship	Opponent in the final	Score
Runner-up	1.	2015	Bulgarian Open	(Northern Ireland) Mark Allen	0–4

=== Non-ranking finals: 6 (2 titles) ===
Outcome	No.	Year	Championship	Opponent in the final	Score
Winner	1.	2001	Benson & Hedges Championship	(Scotland) Hugh Abernethy	9–5
Runner-up	1.	2001	Challenge Tour - Event 2	(Republic of Ireland) Leo Fernandez	3–6
Runner-up	2.	2002	Challenge Tour - Event 4	(England) David Gilbert	3–6
Runner-up	3.	2010	Beijing International Challenge	(China) Tian Pengfei	3–9
Runner-up	4.	2017	Championship League	(Scotland) John Higgins	0–3
Winner	2.	2018	Romanian Masters	(England) Stuart Bingham	10–8

=== Pro-am finals: 9 (5 titles) ===
Outcome	No.	Year	Championship	Opponent in the final	Score
Winner	1.	1999	TCC Open Snooker Championship	(Wales) Darren Morgan	6–4
Runner-up	1.	2000	TCC Open Snooker Championship	(Wales) Darren Morgan	3–6
Winner	2.	2002	EASB Open Tour Event 1	(Wales) James Reynolds	5–4
Winner	3.	2003	EASB Open Tour Event 2	(England) Mark Gray	5–3
Runner-up	2.	2006	Pontins Pro-Am - Event 2	(England) Judd Trump	1−4
Runner-up	3.	2006	Pontins Pro-Am - Event 4	(England) Ricky Walden	2−4
Runner-up	4.	2006	Pontins Pro-Am - Event 6	(England) Dave Harold	1−4
Winner	4.	2006	Pontins Autumn Open	(England) Jamie Cope	5–2
Winner	5.	2008	Austrian Open	(England) Jamie Cope	6–3

=== Team finals: 1 (1 title) ===
Outcome	No.	Year	Championship	Team	Opponent in the final	Score
Winner	1.	2018	Macau Masters	(England) Barry Hawkins (China) Zhao Xintong (China) Zhou Yuelong	(Wales) Mark Williams (England) Joe Perry (Hong Kong) Marco Fu (China) Zhang Anda	5–1

=== Amateur finals: 2 (1 title) ===
Outcome	No.	Year	Championship	Opponent in the final	Score
Winner	1.	1998	Welsh Amateur Championship	(Wales) Ron Jones	8–4
Runner-up	1.	1998	IBSF World Snooker Championship	(England) Luke Simmonds	10–11
