= 2015 World Snooker Championship =

Professional snooker tournament

2015 Betfred World Snooker Championship

Tournament information
- Dates: 18 April – 4 May 2015
- Venue: Crucible Theatre
- City: Sheffield
- Country: England
- Organisation: World Snooker
- Format: Ranking event
- Total prize fund: £1,364,000
- Winner's share: £300,000
- Highest break: Stuart Bingham (ENG) (145); Neil Robertson (AUS) (145)

Final
- Champion: Stuart Bingham (ENG)
- Runner-up: Shaun Murphy (ENG)
- Score: 18–15

The 2015 World Snooker Championship (officially the 2015 Betfred World Snooker Championship) was a professional snooker tournament which took place from 18 April to 4 May 2015 at the Crucible Theatre in Sheffield, England. It was the 39th consecutive year that the World Snooker Championship had been held at the Crucible, and was the final ranking event of the 2014–15 snooker season. Sports betting company Betfred sponsored the event for the first time in three years, having previously done so from 2009 to 2012. The top sixteen players in the snooker world rankings were placed into the draw, and another sixteen players qualified for the event at a tournament taking place from 8 to 15 April 2015 at the Ponds Forge International Sports Centre, Sheffield.

Mark Selby was the defending champion, having defeated Ronnie O'Sullivan in the 2014 final. Selby lost 9–13 in the second round to event debutant Anthony McGill, and became the 16th first-time champion unable to defend his title at the venue. Shaun Murphy, the 2005 winner, met Stuart Bingham in the final. Bingham, who was given odds of 50–1 to win the tournament by bookmakers before the start of the tournament, defeated Murphy 18–15 in the final to win the first world title of his 20-year professional career. Aged 38, Bingham became the oldest player to win the title since Ray Reardon in 1978.

The tournament featured 86 century breaks, a record for the championship, beating the 83 scored in 2009. The highest break was 145, achieved by both Bingham and Neil Robertson. The event had a prize fund of £1,364,000, the winner receiving £300,000.

== Overview ==
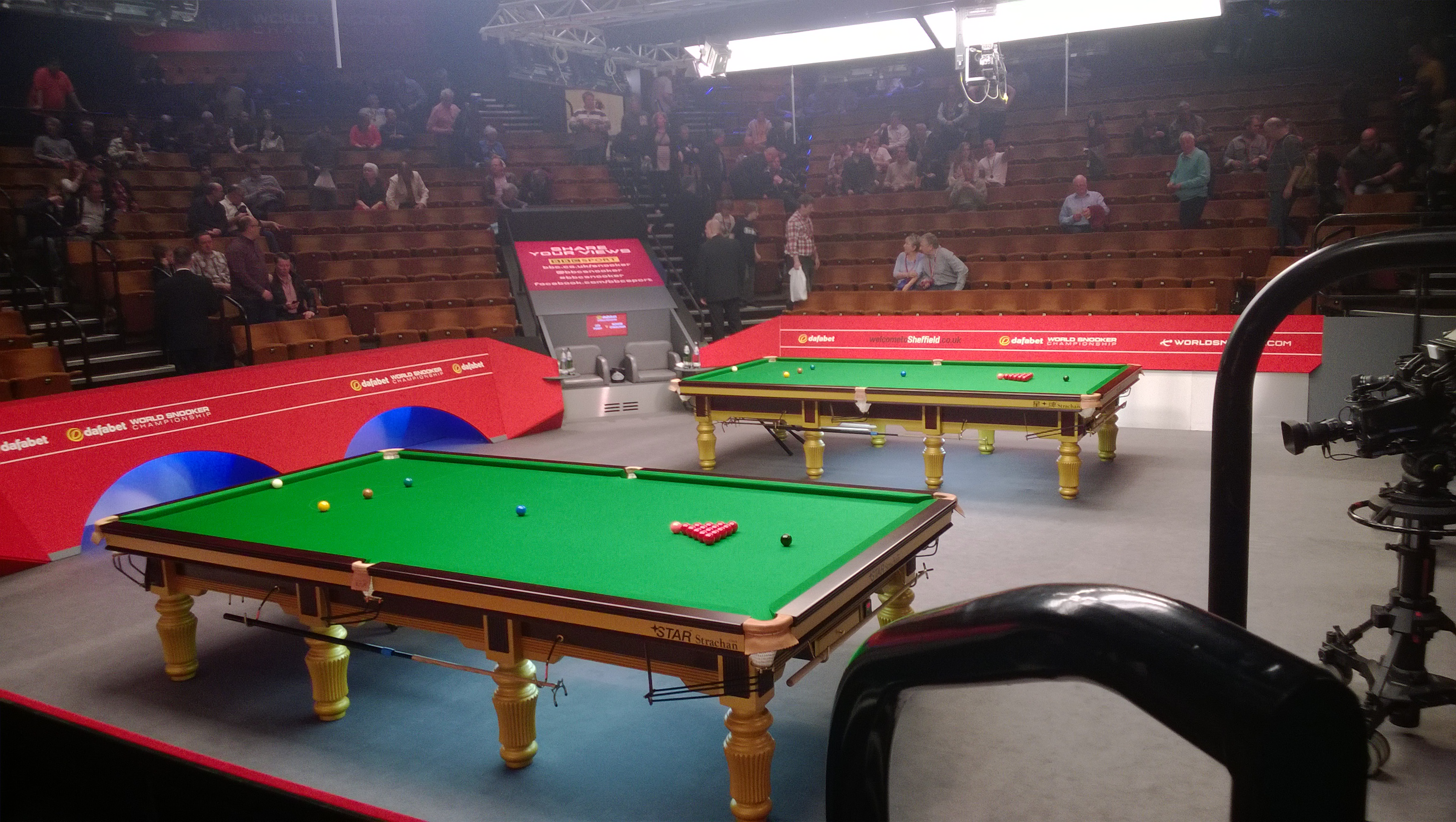
The event took place at the Crucible Theatre in Sheffield, England (image taken during event)

The World Snooker Championship is an annual cue sport tournament and the official professional world championship of the game of snooker. Founded in the late 19th century by British Army soldiers stationed in India, the sport was originally played in the United Kingdom. In modern times, it has been played worldwide, especially in East and Southeast Asia nations such as China, Hong Kong and Thailand.

The world championship sees professional players compete in one-on-one snooker matches in a single-elimination format, each played over several frames. The player participating in the championship are selected through a mix of the snooker world rankings, and a pre-tournament qualification round. The first world championship in 1927 was won by Joe Davis, the final being held in Camkin's Hall, Birmingham, England. Since 1977, the event has been held at the Crucible Theatre in Sheffield, England. As of 2022, Stephen Hendry and Ronnie O'Sullivan are the event's most successful participants in the modern era, having both won the championship seven times. Englishman Mark Selby had won the previous year's championship by defeating fellow countryman Ronnie O'Sullivan in the final 18–14. The winner of the 2015 event earned prize money of £300,000, from a total pool of £1,364,000. The event was sponsored by sports betting company Betfred, who had also done so for the event from 2009 to 2012.

=== Format ===
The 2015 World Snooker Championship was held from 18 April to 4 May 2015 in Sheffield, England. The tournament was the last of 11 rankings events in the 2014–15 snooker season on the World Snooker Tour. It featured a 32-player main draw that took place at the Crucible Theatre, as well as a 128-player qualifying draw that was played at the 8 and 15 April 2015 at the Ponds Forge International Sports Centre, finishing three days before the start of the main tournament. This was the 39th consecutive year that the tournament had been held at the Crucible, and it was the 47th successive world championship to be contested through the knockout format after reverting from a challenge match system in the 1960s. (Note: The 1964–1968 World Snooker Championships were held on a "challenge match basis". A chosen player would compete against the champion, rather than a tournament.)

The top 16 players in the world rankings automatically qualified for the main draw as seeded players. (Note: In the event of the defending champion being ranked outside the top 16, he would replace the player ranked world number 16 as an automatic qualifier.) Selby was seeded first overall as the defending champion, and the remaining 15 seeds were allocated based on the world rankings, released after the penultimate event of the season, the China Open. The number of frames needed to win a match increased with each proceeding round of the main draw, starting with best-of-19-frames matches in the first round, leading up to the final which was played as a best-of-35-frames match.

=== Prize fund ===
The prize fund of the event was raised to £1,364,000 from the previous year's £1,214,000. The breakdown of prize money for this year is shown below:

- Winner: £300,000
- Runner-up: £125,000
- Semi-final: £60,000
- Quarter-final: £30,000
- Last 16: £20,000
- Last 32: £12,000
- Last 48: £9,000
- Last 80: £6,000
- Non-televised highest break: £1,000
- Televised highest break: £10,000
- Total: £1,364,000

=== Participant summary ===
The event featured 144 participants, 128 competing in qualifying alongside 16 invited players. The top 16 seeds automatically qualified for the main draw based on the snooker world rankings before the tournament. Ali Carter was seeded 13, despite being ranked 31, because his seeding had been frozen while he underwent treatment for cancer. This meant that Michael White, ranked 16, had to play in the qualifying tournament. For the first time, players ranked 17 to 32 had to win three qualifying matches, rather than one.

Ten former world champions competed in the tournament. Peter Ebdon, Steve Davis, and Ken Doherty lost in the qualifying rounds, but Graeme Dott qualified for the main stages. Six other former champions (John Higgins, Shaun Murphy, Ronnie O'Sullivan, Neil Robertson, Mark Selby, and Mark Williams) automatically qualified by virtue of their top 16 rankings. Davis became the first player to compete in a total of 100 World Championship matches, including qualifiers, as he lost 1–10 to Kurt Maflin. Ten-time women's world champion Reanne Evans attempted to become the first woman to reach the televised stages of the World Championship, but she lost 8–10 to Doherty in the first qualifying round.

== Summary ==
=== First round ===
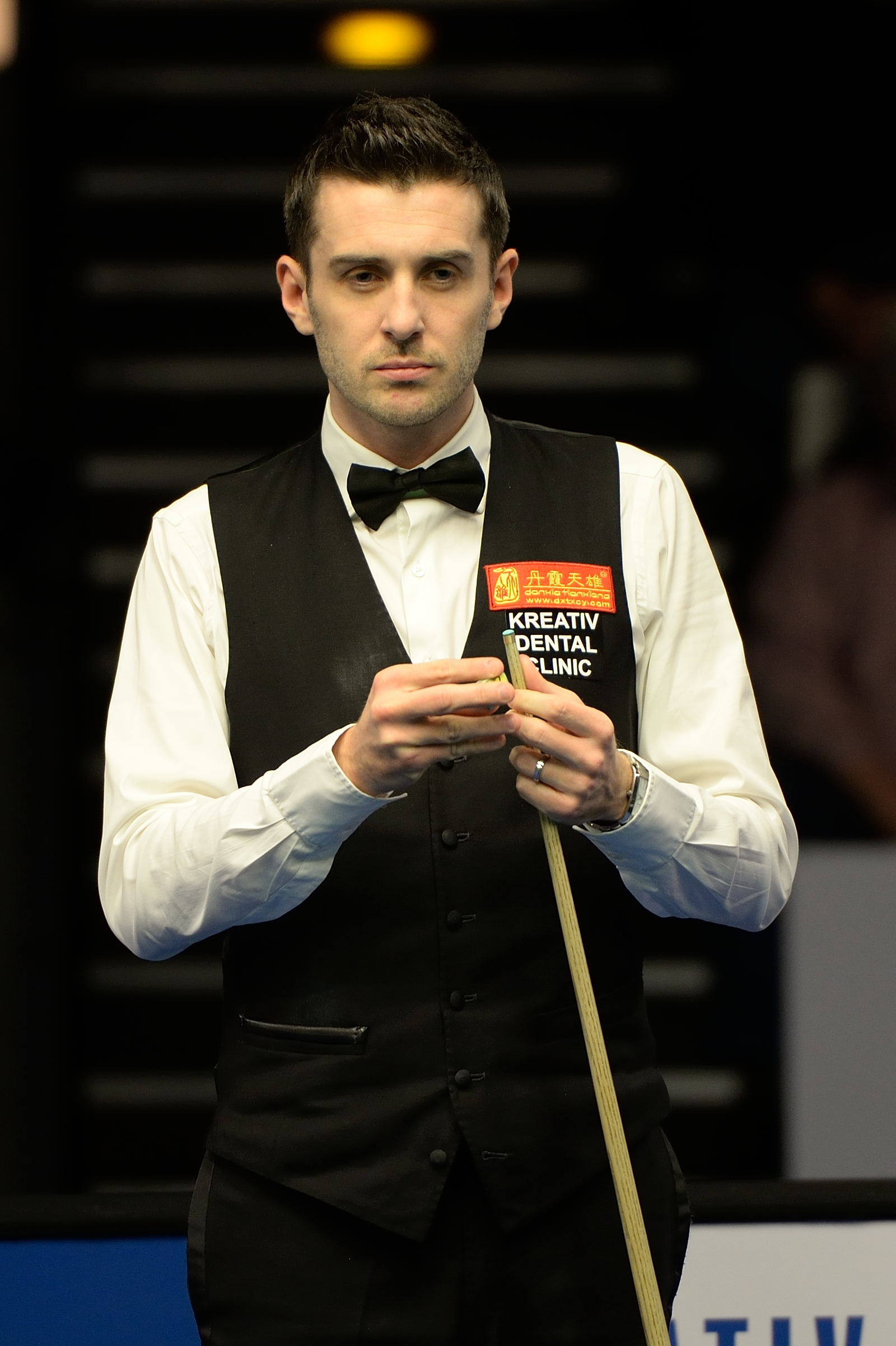
Defending champion Mark Selby was eliminated in the second round.

The first round was played as the best of 19 frames held over two sessions between 18 and 23 April. First-round debutants at the championship were England's Craig Steadman, and Stuart Carrington, Scotland's Anthony McGill, and Norway's Kurt Maflin. McGill and Carrington had both played at the Crucible before, in the Junior Pot Black in 2006. Mark Selby led 6–3 and 8–4 against Maflin, but trailed after his opponent won five frames in a row. Selby recovered from 8–9 down to clinch a 10–9 win. In his match against Steadman, O'Sullivan risked a sanction for removing a pair of uncomfortable shoes and playing briefly in his socks, before borrowing a replacement pair of shoes from tournament director Mike Ganley. Carter, who had missed the first five months of the season after extensive treatment for cancer, won his match 10–5 against Alan McManus.

Higgins recorded seven breaks over 50 in a 10–5 victory over Robert Milkins. McGill led Maguire 9–5, and took the deciding frame with a break of 122 after Maguire had won four successive frames to level at 9–9. Marco Fu and Jimmy Robertson were tied at 5–5, Fu winning five of the next six frames for a 10–6 win. Mark Davis built a 4–0 lead against Ding Junhui, but won only three out of the next thirteen, and lost 7–10. Mark Allen, trailing 1–3, took the next nine frames to progress 10–3 at the expense of Day. Hawkins led Matthew Selt 7–2 and 9–4, but had to win the match in a deciding frame as Selt won the next five frames. Stevens, who had been defeated in the 2000 final by Williams, eliminated Williams at the 2015 event, completing a 10–2 victory.

Zhang Anda, who at 98th in the rankings was the lowest ranked qualifier, lost the first seven frames in his match against Joe Perry. He won only four frames, and lost 4–10. Neil Robertson compiled a 143 total clearance in the third frame of his 10–2 defeat of Jamie Jones. Murphy, who declared that he was planning to take an attacking approach to matches, as he had in winning the 2005 tournament, won 10–3 against Hull. Robbie Williams led 5–4 against Stuart Bingham after their first session, which featured breaks over 50 in each of the frames, but lost 7–10. Dott defeated Ricky Walden 10–8 after the pair had been level at 4–4 and 7–7. Judd Trump completed a 10–6 win against Carrington with a break of 109 in the 16th frame.

=== Second round ===
The second round was played as the best of 25 frames, held over three sessions between 23 and 27 April. Selby and McGill were tied at 4–4 after their opening session, but McGill led 10–6 after the second. He later won the match 13–9, making Selby the 16th first-time champion who failed to defend his title since the tournament moved to the Crucible in 1977, succumbing to what has become known as the 'Crucible curse'. Ding lost five of the first six frame in his match against Higgins but won the match 13–9 to reach only his third quarter-final in nine years. Higgins praised Ding's positional play after the match, crediting it as the best since Steve Davis.

Barry Hawkins trailed Allen 8–11, but won five straight frames to win the match 13–11. Allen commented that his opponent "froze [him] out", and Hawkins suggested the win would strengthen him going forward. Bingham reached his second Crucible quarter-final, winning seven out of the last eight frames to defeat Dott 13–5. Three of the other four-second round matches ended with 13–5 wins for O'Sullivan over Matthew Stevens, Murphy over Perry, and Robertson over Carter. Judd Trump defeated Fu 13–8. Robertson compiled a break of 145 in the last frame of his match against Carter.

=== Quarter-finals ===
The quarter-finals were played on 28 and 29 April, as the best of 25 frames, held over three sessions. Trump defeated Ding 13–4 after leading 6–2 and 12–4 after the first two sessions to reach his third World Championship semi-final. He commented that "he won't get beaten" if he continued to play in the same manner for the rest of the tournament. Murphy led the last remaining qualifier McGill 9–7, and won four of the next five to win 13–8 and reach the semi-finals for the first time since 2009. Bingham made the joint highest break of the tournament in the quarter-final match against O'Sullivan. He reached the first career semi-final after completing 13–9 victory over tournament favourite O'Sullivan, who had beaten Bingham 13–4 at the same stage of the tournament two years before. A controversial incident occurred in the fifth frame of the match, when O'Sullivan placed his chalk on the table and used it to line up a shot. Referee Terry Camilleri did not penalise O'Sullivan, even though the rules of snooker call for a seven-point foul if a player uses an object to measure gaps or distances. The referee's handling of the incident was questioned from the commentary box by former world champion Doherty and on Twitter by former tour referee Michaela Tabb. Bingham commented that he had been in tears after the match, calling it "unbelievable".

In the last quarter-final match, Hawkins defeated Robertson 13–12 to reach the semi-finals for a third consecutive year. Hawkins and Robertson produced four century breaks each to equal the record of eight centuries in one match, a new record for a 25-frame match. Their encounter also included the longest frame in the 2015 tournament to that point, at 70 minutes and 22 seconds.

=== Semi-finals ===
The semi-finals were played between 30 April and 2 May, as the best of 33 frames, held over four sessions. All four world championship semi-finalists were English, of whom, Murphy was the only former winner of the event to reach the last four. Murphy took a 6–2 lead over Hawkins in the first session and extended it to 13–3 after the second. Hawkins won the third session, taking five out of eight frames, but trailed 16–8. Murphy wrapped up a 17–9 victory in the final session to reach the third world championship final of his career, after 2005 and 2009. Murphy commented that he was "blown away" at reaching the final of the event again. With five century breaks from Murphy and three from Hawkins, the match equalled the record for the most centuries in a professional match at the Crucible.

In a much closer encounter, Bingham led Trump 5–3 after the first session, 9–7 after the second, and 13–11 after the third. From 14 to 16 down, Trump produced two consecutive century breaks to force a deciding frame. Trump had the first chance in the final frame, but suffered a kick allowing Bingham to prevail and defeat Trump 17–16 and reach his first World Championship final. Bingham commented ""It's unbelievable, I cant believe I'm in the world final" Trump commented that despite Bingham playing well, it was "tough to take, really. I needed one good chance. If I'd missed the pot normally then fair play but the kick threw it off line... I feel it's been a little bit taken away from me."

=== Final ===
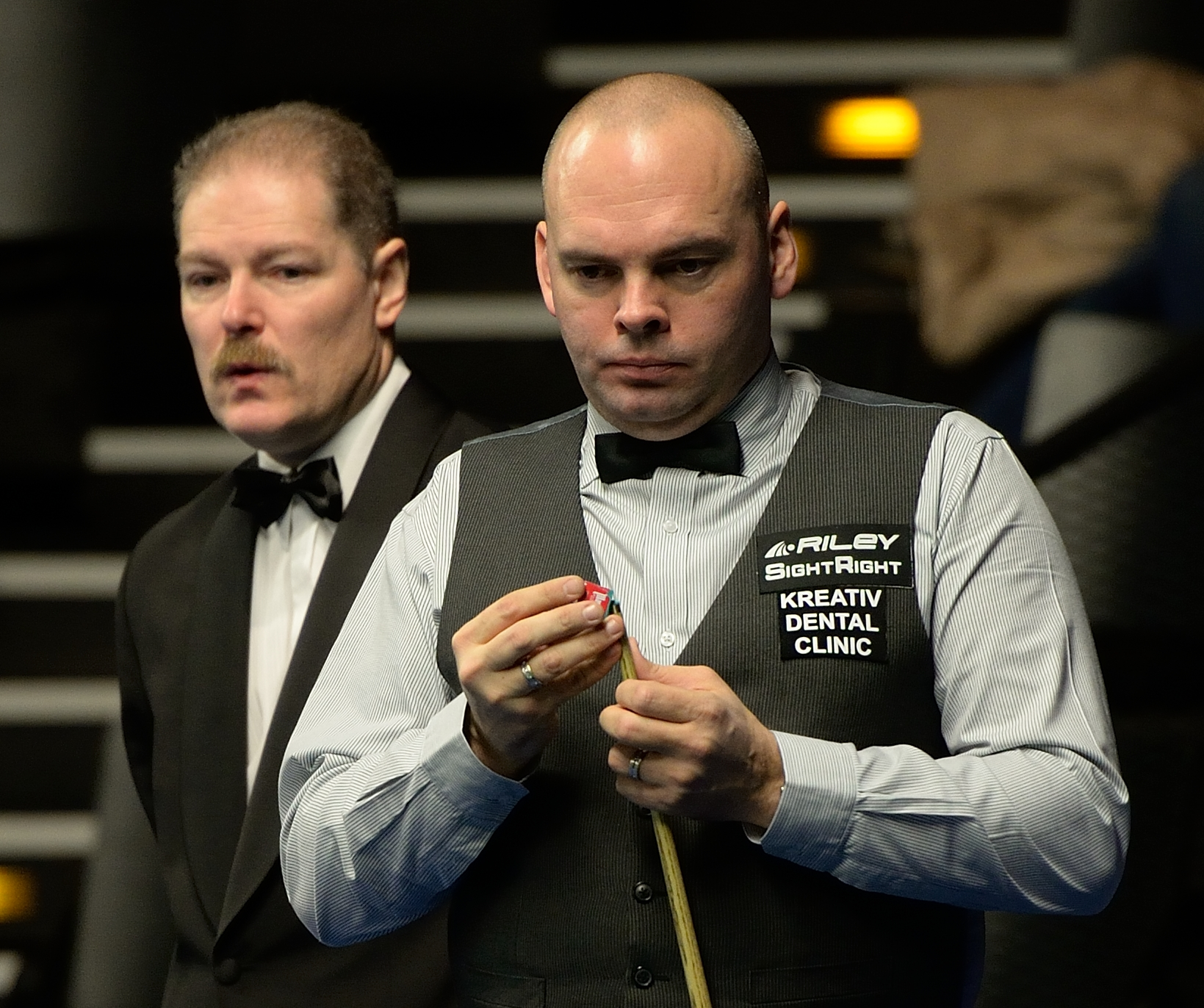
Stuart Bingham won the event, despite having odds of 50–1 against doing so before the event.

The final was held on 3 and 4 May as the best of 35 frames, across four sessions. At the age of 38, Bingham was the oldest first-time finalist at the Crucible since 45-year-old Ray Reardon in 1978, although Reardon had already won five world titles at other venues by that point in his career. It was the third appearance in the final for Murphy, who won the title in 2005 with an 18–16 victory over Stevens and was runner-up in 2009 when he lost 9–18 to Higgins. The final was refereed for the first time by Olivier Marteel, from Koksijde in West Flanders, Belgium, who had previously officiated on the semi-final the previous year. He was also the first Belgian to take charge of a World Championship final, and the second referee from continental Europe to do so, after Jan Verhaas.

To open the final, Murphy took a 3–0 lead, but Bingham fought back to end the session all-square at 4–4. In the second session of nine frames, Murphy began strongly, winning four consecutive frames to move 8–4 ahead, but Bingham won four of the next five to reduce Murphy's lead to 9–8 overnight. Bingham's break of 123 in the 14th frame was the 84th century break compiled at the Crucible in 2015, breaking the previous record of 83 centuries set in 2009. In the third session, Bingham won six of the eight frames to move into a 14–11 lead. In the 20th frame, Bingham attempted a maximum break, potting 14 reds and 14 blacks before missing the final red. Although Murphy won four of the first five frames in the final session to draw level at 15–15, Bingham won the 64-minute 31st frame to go 16–15 in front, and then added two more frames for an 18–15 victory and his first world title.

Bingham had odds of 50–1 to win before the tournament. The achievement made him the oldest player to win the title since Reardon in 1978. He was the third oldest winner in Crucible history after Reardon in 1978 and John Spencer who was 41 in 1977. (Note: Mark Williams would win the title aged 43 in 2018.) Winning the title also took him to a career high of second in the world rankings. The final was noted for its high standard of break-building, with 6 centuries and 24 more over 50 in the 33 frames played.

== Main draw ==
Shown below are the results for each round. Numbers in brackets denote player seedings; players in bold denote match winners. The draw for the first round took place at Hallamshire Golf Club on 16 April 2015, one day after the end of the last qualifying round.

**First round** Best of 19 frames
18 April
**Mark Selby (ENG) (1)**	**10**
Kurt Maflin (NOR)	9
18 & 19 April
Stephen Maguire (SCO) (16)	9
**Anthony McGill (SCO)**	**10**
22 April
**Joe Perry (ENG) (9)**	**10**
Zhang Anda (CHN)	4
22 & 23 April
**Shaun Murphy (ENG) (8)**	**10**
Robin Hull (FIN)	3
19 & 20 April
**Barry Hawkins (ENG) (5)**	**10**
Matthew Selt (ENG)	9
21 April
**Mark Allen (NIR) (12)**	**10**
Ryan Day (WAL)	3
20 & 21 April
**Ali Carter (ENG) (13)**	**10**
Alan McManus (SCO)	5
19 & 20 April
**Neil Robertson (AUS) (4)**	**10**
Jamie Jones (WAL)	2
20 & 21 April
**Ding Junhui (CHN) (3)**	**10**
Mark Davis (ENG)	7
18 & 19 April
**John Higgins (SCO) (14)**	**10**
Robert Milkins (ENG)	5
18 & 19 April
**Marco Fu (HKG) (11)**	**10**
Jimmy Robertson (ENG)	6
22 & 23 April
**Judd Trump (ENG) (6)**	**10**
Stuart Carrington (ENG)	6
18 & 19 April
Ricky Walden (ENG) (7)	8
**Graeme Dott (SCO)**	**10**
20 April
**Stuart Bingham (ENG) (10)**	**10**
Robbie Williams (ENG)	7
21 & 22 April
Mark Williams (WAL) (15)	2
**Matthew Stevens (WAL)**	**10**
21 & 22 April
**Ronnie O'Sullivan (ENG) (2)**	**10**
Craig Steadman (ENG)	3

**Second round** Best of 25 frames
23 & 24 April
(England) Mark Selby (1)	9
(Scotland) **Anthony McGill**	**13**
26 & 27 April
(England) Joe Perry (9)	5
(England) **Shaun Murphy (8)**	**13**
24 & 25 April
(England) **Barry Hawkins (5)**	**13**
(Northern Ireland) Mark Allen (12)	11
25, 26 & 27 April
(England) Ali Carter (13)	5
(Australia) **Neil Robertson (4)**	**13**
23, 24 & 25 April
(China) **Ding Junhui (3)**	**13**
(Scotland) John Higgins (14)	9
26 & 27 April
(Hong Kong) Marco Fu (11)	8
(England) **Judd Trump (6)**	**13**
24 & 25 April
(Scotland) Graeme Dott	5
(England) **Stuart Bingham (10)**	**13**
25, 26 & 27 April
(Wales) Matthew Stevens	5
(England) **Ronnie O'Sullivan (2)**	**13**

**Quarter-finals**; Best of 25 frames
28 & 29 April
(Scotland) Anthony McGill	8
(England) **Shaun Murphy (8)**	**13**
28 & 29 April
(England) **Barry Hawkins (5)**	**13**
(Australia) Neil Robertson (4)	12
28 & 29 April
(China) Ding Junhui (3)	4
(England) **Judd Trump (6)**	**13**
28 & 29 April
(England) **Stuart Bingham (10)**	**13**
(England) Ronnie O'Sullivan (2)	9

**Semi-finals**; Best of 33 frames
30 April, 1 & 2 May
(England) **Shaun Murphy (8)**	**17**
(England) Barry Hawkins (5)	9
30 April, 1 & 2 May
(England) Judd Trump (6)	16
(England) **Stuart Bingham (10)**	**17**

**Final**; Best of 35 frames
3 & 4 May
(England) Shaun Murphy (8)	15
(England) **Stuart Bingham (10)**	**18**

Final: (Best of 35 frames) Crucible Theatre, Sheffield. 3 & 4 May. Referee: Olivier Marteel.
Shaun Murphy (8); England				15–**18**			**Stuart Bingham (10)**; England			
Session 1: 4–4
Frame	1	2	3	4	5	6	7	8	9	10
Murphy	**103**^{†} (68)	**69**^{†} (59)	**74**^{†} (65)	0	15	**90**^{†} (90)	7	30	N/A	N/A
Bingham	44	51	5	**105**^{†} (105)	**68**^{†} (56)	0	**55**^{†}	**73**^{†} (65)	N/A	N/A
Session 2: 9–8
Frame	1	2	3	4	5	6	7	8	9	10
Murphy	**74**^{†} (74)	**106**^{†} (106)	**121**^{†} (121)	**97**^{†} (51)	1	7	0	**76**^{†} (76)	22	N/A
Bingham	57 (57)	1	14	41	**76**^{†} (76)	**129**^{†} (123)	**113**^{†} (89)	0	**67**^{†} (53)	N/A
Session 3: 11–14
Frame	1	2	3	4	5	6	7	8	9	10
Murphy	4	40	0	23	**80**^{†} (59)	0	**84**^{†} (84)	7	N/A	N/A
Bingham	**87**^{†} (87)	**68**^{†} (51)	**112**^{†} (112)	**95**^{†} (50)	4	**87**^{†} (87)	0	**86**^{†} (57)	N/A	N/A
Session 4: 15–**18**
Frame	1	2	3	4	5	6	7	8	9	10
Murphy	**73**	6	**75**^{†} (75)	**68**^{†} (64)	**76**^{†}	56	3	1	N/A	N/A
Bingham	6	**102**^{†} (102)	55 (47)	29	0	**80**^{†}	**68**^{†} (55)	**88**^{†} (88)	N/A	N/A
121				Highest break			123			
2				Century breaks			4			
11				50+ breaks			13			
Numbers in parentheses indicate breaks of 50 or more. † = Winner of frame

== Qualifying ==
The three qualifying rounds took place between 8 and 15 April 2015 at the Ponds Forge International Sports Centre in Sheffield, England. All matches were played as the best-of-19 frames.

Round 1 Best of 19 frames		Round 2 Best of 19 frames		Round 3 Best of 19 frames
Michael White (WAL)	10
Steven Hallworth (ENG)	8	Michael White (WAL)	5
Craig Steadman (ENG)	10	Craig Steadman (ENG)	10
Rhys Clark (SCO)	5			Craig Steadman (ENG)	10
Thepchaiya Un-Nooh (THA)	10			Jamie Burnett (SCO)	6
Barry Pinches (ENG)	8	Thepchaiya Un-Nooh (THA)	8
Jamie Burnett (SCO)	10	Jamie Burnett (SCO)	10
Alex Borg (MLT)	8
Mark King (ENG)	10
Michael Leslie (SCO)	7	Mark King (ENG)	10
Marcus Campbell (SCO)	10	Marcus Campbell (SCO)	6
Ivaylo Pekov (BUL)	2			Mark King (ENG)	9
Cao Yupeng (CHN)	10			Anthony McGill (SCO)	10
Ross Muir (SCO)	8	Cao Yupeng (CHN)	6
Anthony McGill (SCO)	10	Anthony McGill (SCO)	10
Hossein Vafaei (IRN)	3
Martin Gould (ENG)	6
Adam Duffy (ENG)	10	Adam Duffy (ENG)	10
Sam Baird (ENG)	10	Sam Baird (ENG)	7
Tony Drago (MLT)	7			Adam Duffy (ENG)	8
Rory McLeod (ENG)	2			Jamie Jones (WAL)	10
Tian Pengfei (CHN)	10	Tian Pengfei (CHN)	5
Jamie Jones (WAL)	10	Jamie Jones (WAL)	10
Ashley Carty (ENG)	3
Gerard Greene (NIR)	10
Elliot Slessor (ENG)	4	Gerard Greene (NIR)	6
Alfie Burden (ENG)	4	Mitchell Mann (ENG)	10
Mitchell Mann (ENG)	10			Mitchell Mann (ENG)	6
Lyu Haotian (CHN)	8			Alan McManus (SCO)	10
Andrew Pagett (WAL)	10	Andrew Pagett (WAL)	4
Alan McManus (SCO)	10	Alan McManus (SCO)	10
Michael Wasley (ENG)	5
Ryan Day (WAL)	10
Jamie Clarke (WAL)	7	Ryan Day (WAL)	10
Alex Davies (ENG)	10	Alex Davies (ENG)	2
Michael Georgiou (ENG)	6			Ryan Day (WAL)	10
Aditya Mehta (IND)	7			Jak Jones (WAL)	6
Jak Jones (WAL)	10	Jak Jones (WAL)	10
Jack Lisowski (ENG)	10	Jack Lisowski (ENG)	5
Allan Taylor (ENG)	7
Gary Wilson (ENG)	10
Eden Sharav (SCO)	5	Gary Wilson (ENG)	7
Li Hang (CHN)	10	Li Hang (CHN)	10
Chris Melling (ENG)	1			Li Hang (CHN)	9
Stuart Carrington (ENG)	10			Stuart Carrington (ENG)	10
Joel Walker (ENG)	6	Stuart Carrington (ENG)	10
Peter Ebdon (ENG)	10	Peter Ebdon (ENG)	7
Lu Ning (CHN)	6
Ben Woollaston (ENG)	10
Sean O'Sullivan (ENG)	8	Ben Woollaston (ENG)	6
Robin Hull (FIN)	10	Robin Hull (FIN)	10
Martin McCrudden (IRL)	3			Robin Hull (FIN)	10
Nigel Bond (ENG)	3			Igor Figueiredo (BRA)	4
Igor Figueiredo (BRA)	10	Igor Figueiredo (BRA)	10
Rod Lawler (ENG)	10	Rod Lawler (ENG)	9
Michael Tomlinson (ENG)	4
Mike Dunn (ENG)	10
Itaro Santos (BRA)	4	Mike Dunn (ENG)	7
Yu Delu (CHN)	10	Yu Delu (CHN)	10
Hans Blanckaert (BEL)	0			Yu Delu (CHN)	7
Fraser Patrick (SCO)	10			Graeme Dott (SCO)	10
Brandon Sargeant (ENG)	3	Fraser Patrick (SCO)	2
Graeme Dott (SCO)	10	Graeme Dott (SCO)	10
Mark Owens (SCO)	4
Mark Davis (ENG)	10
Joe O'Connor (ENG)	4	Mark Davis (ENG)	10
Oliver Lines (ENG)	10	Oliver Lines (ENG)	7
Ian Glover (ENG)	7			Mark Davis (ENG)	10
David Morris (IRL)	9			Ken Doherty (IRL)	3
Lee Walker (WAL)	10	Lee Walker (WAL)	6
Ken Doherty (IRL)	10	Ken Doherty (IRL)	10
Reanne Evans (ENG)	8
Matthew Stevens (WAL)	10
Ahmed Saif (QAT)	5	Matthew Stevens (WAL)	10
Peter Lines (ENG)	10	Peter Lines (ENG)	7
Rodion Judin (LAT)	6			Matthew Stevens (WAL)	10
Joe Swail (NIR)	10			Joe Swail (NIR)	5
Alexander Ursenbacher (SUI)	4	Joe Swail (NIR)	10
Dominic Dale (WAL)	10	Dominic Dale (WAL)	9
John Astley (ENG)	6
Fergal O'Brien (IRL)	10
Hammad Miah (ENG)	5	Fergal O'Brien (IRL)	10
Chris Wakelin (ENG)	10	Chris Wakelin (ENG)	8
Nico Elton (ENG)	6			Fergal O'Brien (IRL)	9
Jamie Cope (ENG)	9			Kurt Maflin (NOR)	10
Steve Davis (ENG)	10	Steve Davis (ENG)	1
Kurt Maflin (NOR)	10	Kurt Maflin (NOR)	10
David Grace (ENG)	5
Mark Joyce (ENG)	10
Ian Burns (ENG)	6	Mark Joyce (ENG)	9
Anthony Hamilton (ENG)	3	Zhang Anda (CHN)	10
Zhang Anda (CHN)	10			Zhang Anda (CHN)	10
Zhou Yuelong (CHN)	10			Liang Wenbo (CHN)	9
Zak Surety (ENG)	8	Zhou Yuelong (CHN)	5
Liang Wenbo (CHN)	10	Liang Wenbo (CHN)	10
Chris Norbury (ENG)	4
Xiao Guodong (CHN)	10
Ong Jia Jun (SIN)	1	Xiao Guodong (CHN)	10
Liam Highfield (ENG)	10	Liam Highfield (ENG)	5
Oliver Brown (ENG)	1			Xiao Guodong (CHN)	9
Kyren Wilson (ENG)	3			Jimmy Robertson (ENG)	10
Thanawat Thirapongpaiboon (THA)	10	Thanawat Thirapongpaiboon (THA)	6
Jimmy Robertson (ENG)	10	Jimmy Robertson (ENG)	10
Thor Chuan Leong (MAS)	7
Dechawat Poomjaeng (THA)	10
Daniel Wells (WAL)	8	Dechawat Poomjaeng (THA)	8
Robbie Williams (ENG)	10	Robbie Williams (ENG)	10
Lee Page (ENG)	3			Robbie Williams (ENG)	10
Noppon Saengkham (THA)	10			Michael Holt (ENG)	5
Lukas Kleckers (GER)	6	Noppon Saengkham (THA)	2
Michael Holt (ENG)	10	Michael Holt (ENG)	10
Sydney Wilson (ENG)	3
Matthew Selt (ENG)	10
Lü Chenwei (CHN)	8	Matthew Selt (ENG)	10
Jimmy White (ENG)	10	Jimmy White (ENG)	8
James Wattana (THA)	3			Matthew Selt (ENG)	10
Tom Ford (ENG)	10			Tom Ford (ENG)	8
Andrew Norman (ENG)	2	Tom Ford (ENG)	10
David Gilbert (ENG)	10	David Gilbert (ENG)	8
George Pragnall (ENG)	5
Luca Brecel (BEL)	10
Saqib Nasir (ENG)	0	Luca Brecel (BEL)	3
Andrew Higginson (ENG)	10	Andrew Higginson (ENG)	10
Scott Donaldson (SCO)	8			Andrew Higginson (ENG)	9
James Cahill (ENG)	9			Robert Milkins (ENG)	10
Darryl Hill (IOM)	10	Darryl Hill (IOM)	6
Robert Milkins (ENG)	10	Robert Milkins (ENG)	10
William Lemons (ENG)	6

== Century breaks ==
=== Televised stage centuries ===
There were 86 century breaks in the televised stage of the World Championship. For every century break made during the 17-day championship in Sheffield, the title sponsor, Betfred, pledged to donate £200 to World Snooker's official charity, the Bluebell Wood Children's Hospice; in line with the sponsor's declaration, the donation was rounded up to £25,000 as at least 70 centuries were achieved. Neil Robertson and Bingham each compiled a break of 145, the highest breaks achieved in the tournament.

- 145, 143, 142, 141, 133, 130, 129, 119, 115, 115, 109 – Neil Robertson
- 145, 123, 112, 106, 105, 104, 102, 102, 102, 100 – Stuart Bingham
- 139, 118, 116, 110, 104, 103, 100 – Ronnie O'Sullivan
- 138, 127, 125, 121, 121, 121, 111, 106, 106, 105, 105, 101, 100 – Shaun Murphy
- 137, 125, 122 – Anthony McGill
- 135, 109 – Ding Junhui
- 135, 104 – Ricky Walden
- 133, 129, 127, 113, 111, 111, 109, 108, 108, 102 – Judd Trump
- 132 – Zhang Anda
- 131, 109, 108, 108, 108, 104, 104, 103, 103, 102 – Barry Hawkins
- 131 – Joe Perry
- 127 – Ali Carter
- 124, 120, 108, 101 – Mark Selby
- 120 – Marco Fu
- 115, 111 – Matthew Stevens
- 115, 109, 101 – Mark Allen
- 109, 102 – Matthew Selt
- 106 – Jimmy Robertson
- 106 – John Higgins
- 106 – Mark Davis

=== Qualifying stage centuries ===
There were 83 century breaks in the qualifying stage of the World Championship: Three players, Tom Ford, Craig Steadman and David Morris each made the highest break of qualifying, 140.

- 140, 136, 123, 104 – Tom Ford
- 140, 116 – Craig Steadman
- 140 – David Morris
- 139, 138, 126, 125, 112 – Robin Hull
- 139, 114 – Graeme Dott
- 137, 134, 132 – Zhang Anda
- 135 – Tony Drago
- 134, 134 – Andrew Higginson
- 134, 109 – Sam Baird
- 134 – Scott Donaldson
- 133, 100 – Yu Delu
- 132, 111 – Mark Davis
- 131, 123 – Thepchaiya Un-Nooh
- 131, 106 – Mark King
- 131 – Xiao Guodong
- 130, 123 – David Gilbert
- 129, 120 – Dechawat Poomjaeng
- 129 – Ben Woollaston
- 127 – Anthony McGill
- 125, 110, 106, 102 – Fergal O'Brien
- 122, 108, 100 – Kurt Maflin
- 122 – Tian Pengfei
- 122 – Jamie Jones
- 120, 118 – Adam Duffy
- 120, 110 – Jack Lisowski
- 117 – Igor Figueiredo
- 116 – Michael White
- 116 – Jamie Burnett
- 115, 113, 110, 103 – Liang Wenbo
- 115 – Ryan Day
- 115 – Liam Highfield
- 113, 100 – Rod Lawler
- 113 – Li Hang
- 113 – Joe Swail
- 111, 103 – Jimmy Robertson
- 110 – Alan McManus
- 108 – Zhou Yuelong
- 108 – Noppon Saengkham
- 107 – Chris Wakelin
- 106 – Peter Lines
- 106 – Jimmy White
- 105, 104 – Robert Milkins
- 105 – Ashley Carty
- 105 – Stuart Carrington
- 101 – Michael Leslie
- 101 – Michael Holt
- 101 – Matthew Selt
- 101 – Robbie Williams
- 100 – Thanawat Thirapongpaiboon
- 100 – Luca Brecel
- 100 – Darryl Hill
