= Robin Hull =

Finnish snooker player

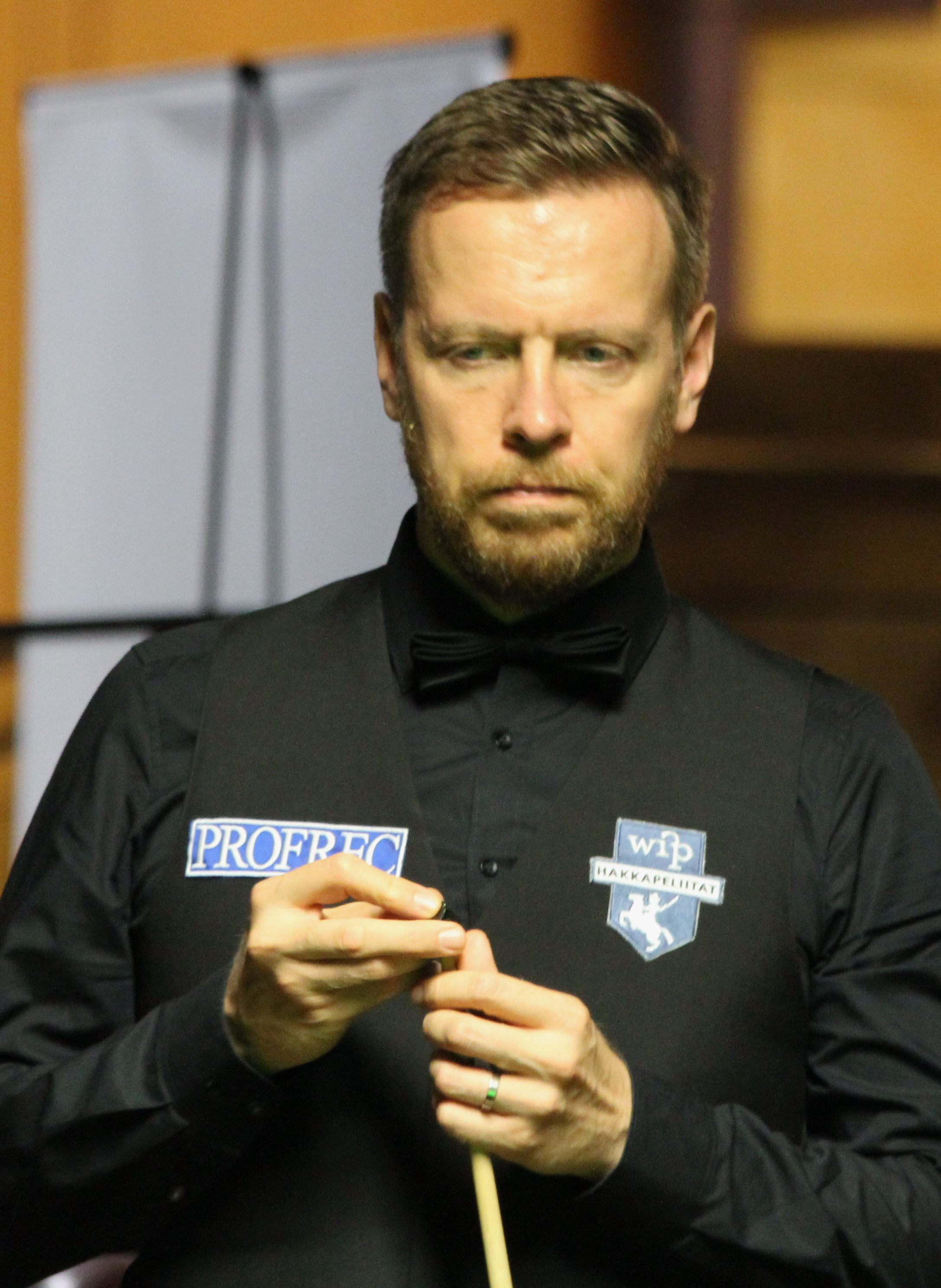
- Hull at the 2017 Paul Hunter Classic

Personal information
- Nickname: The Flying Finn
- Born: 16 August 1974 (age 52) Espoo, Uusimaa, Finland

Sport
- Country: Finland
- Sport: Snooker
- Professional: 1993–1997, 1998–2008, 2011/2012, 2013–2019
- Highest ranking: 32 (2003/2004)
- Century breaks: 168
- Best ranking finish: Quarter-final (x3)

Robin Hull (born 16 August 1974) is a Finnish former professional snooker player.

For some time, he was the sole Nordic player on the game's main tour. He is known as a solid break-builder, having compiled over 150 competitive centuries during his career, among the highest for a player who has never featured in the top 16 in the world rankings.

Hull is one of six players to have missed the final black in attempting a maximum break, alongside Ken Doherty, Thepchaiya Un-Nooh (three times), Barry Pinches, Mark Selby and Liang Wenbo.

== Career ==
Hull became a professional snooker player in 1992. In the 2001–02 season, he reached the last 16 of the 2001 UK Championship, and later qualified for the 2002 World Championship, knocking out Steve Davis in the final qualifying round; in the first round proper, he lost 6–10 to Graeme Dott. These results contributed to Hull entering the world top 32 at the end of the next season.

A potentially fatal viral infection kept Hull out of much of the 2003–04 season, although he still was able to reach his first ever quarter-final at the 2003 Welsh Open. He later repeated this result at the 2006 Malta Cup. However, his performances were largely inconsistent due to his health issues. He was forced to pull out of qualifying for the 2007 World Championship due to an irregular heartbeat thought to be linked to his past illness. After similar problems in the following season, he decided to retire from professional competition.

In February 2010 Hull took part in an invitation event the Finnish Challenge, which featured a number of notable professionals. He impressed, beating Darren Morgan, Ken Doherty and Matthew Stevens on the way to the final, where he lost 1–6 to Mark Williams. This result encouraged Hull to take part in the 2011 Q School tournament in an attempt to qualify for the 2011–12 main tour, which he did successfully in the first event. Due to lack of sponsorship he only played in a handful of events during the season with his best run coming in qualifying for the 2011 UK Championship in November where he beat Lucky Vatnani and Yu Delu, before losing to Peter Lines 4–6. Hull did not enter another tournament after this and finished the season ranked world number 84, outside of the top 64 who retain their places for the 2012–13 season and therefore did not retain his spot on the main tour. In the 2012–13 season Hull entered qualifying for the World Championship as an amateur, where he lost in the first round of preliminary qualifying 2–5 to Paul Wykes, despite making a 137 break during the match.

Hull regained his main tour place for the 2013–14 season by winning the EBSA European Snooker Championships in Zielona Góra, Poland, beating Welshman Gareth Allen 7–2 in the final, finishing the match with two consecutive centuries. He qualified for the 2013 International Championship by beating Liu Chuang 6–2, although he had to withdraw from the venue stages in China, and came close to beating the reigning world champion Ronnie O'Sullivan in the last 64 of the minor-ranking Kay Suzanne Memorial Cup, losing 4–3 after leading 3–1. However, Hull failed to win any other match at the rest of the tournaments, and due to financial reasons skipped most of the second part of the season until the World Championship, where he delivered his best performances in years. He scored an impressive 10–3 win against Tony Drago in the first round, followed by a 10–6 defeat of Tian Pengfei, and a 10–4 win from 3–0 behind against Ian Burns in round three, to set up a final round match against Peter Ebdon, which Hull won 10–8 to reach the Crucible for the second time in his career. He played O'Sullivan in the last 32 and lost 10–4, despite making a century in one of the frames.

The 2014–15 season began well for Hull. He defeated Xiao Guodong, Graeme Dott and Cao Yupeng to reach the quarter-finals (the third of his professional career and first for eight years) of the 2014 Wuxi Classic where he lost 5–2 to eventual runner-up Joe Perry. Hull won most of his opening round matches in the subsequent tournaments, but failed to progress beyond the last 64 stage until the 2015 China Open where he received a bye to the last 32 after Ronnie O'Sullivan's withdrawal, and defeated Mark King 5–4 to reach the last 16, where he lost 5–1 to Kurt Maflin.

Due to missing most of the previous season, Hull arrived at the season-ending World Championship qualifiers needing a repeat of the previous year's performance to retain his tour card by getting into the top 64 of the world rankings. He did exactly that, as he beat Martin McCrudden, Ben Woollaston and Igor Figueiredo to qualify for the Crucible for the second year in a row. He was defeated 10–3 by Shaun Murphy in the first round, but was ranked 61st in the world afterwards.

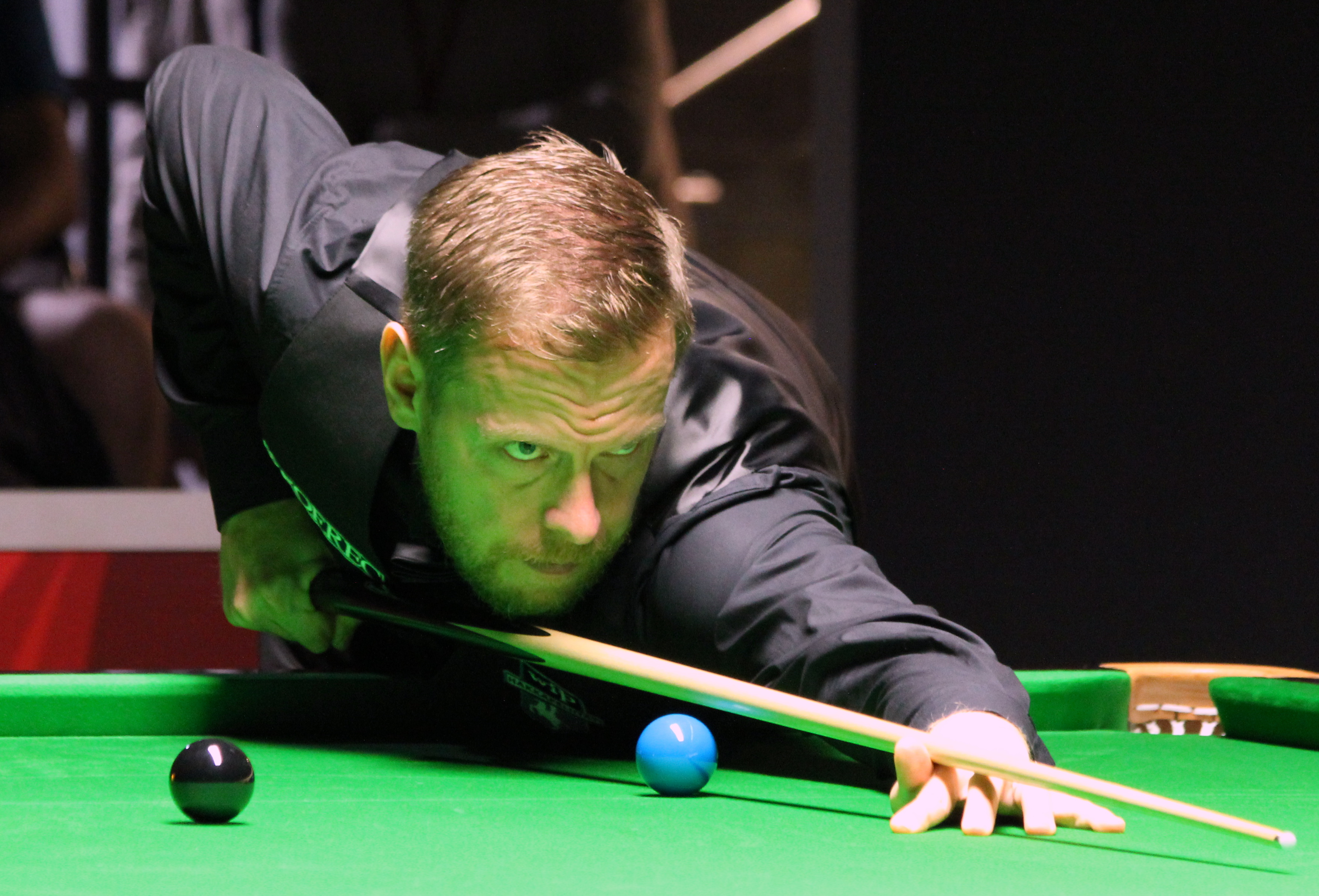
2017 Paul Hunter Classic

Hull did not participate in many tournaments at the start of the 2015–16 season. His first win came at the 2015 UK Championship, where he defeated Zhang Anda 6–4 in the first round, followed by a 6–3 victory over world number eight Barry Hawkins. He was defeated in the third round 6–2 by Luca Brecel, his efforts earning him £9,000. At the Shoot-Out, the tournament in which every match is decided by a single 10-minute frame, Hull won his second professional title by beating Brecel in the final. The winner's prize of £32,000 is the highest pay day of his career.

His Shoot-Out success allowed him to compete in the 2016 Champion of Champions, where he lost 4–2 to Ronnie O'Sullivan in the first round. His only last 16 appearance this year came at the German Masters after he followed qualifying wins over Luca Brecel and Matthew Stevens with a 5–4 victory over Jimmy White, before losing 5–4 to Ryan Day. In the first round of World Championship qualifying, Hull suffered a huge 10–8 shock defeat to 11-time ladies world champion Reanne Evans.

== Personal life ==
Hull was born and raised in Finland, to a Finnish mother and an English father.

== Performance and rankings timeline ==
Tournament	1993/ 94	1994/ 95	1995/ 96	1996/ 97	1997/ 98	1998/ 99	1999/ 00	2000/ 01	2001/ 02	2002/ 03	2003/ 04	2004/ 05	2005/ 06	2006/ 07	2007/ 08	2011/ 12	2012/ 13	2013/ 14	2014/ 15	2015/ 16	2016/ 17	2017/ 18	2018/ 19	2019/ 20
Ranking (Note: From the 2010/2011 season it shows the ranking at the beginning of the season.)	(Note: New players on the Main Tour don't have a ranking.)	212	128	132	(Note: He was an amateur.)		101	102	86	39	32	47	55	50	54				73	61	59	(Note: Players qualified One Year Ranking List started the season without ranking points.)	76	
Ranking tournaments
Riga Masters (Note: The event was called the Riga Open (2014/2015–2015/2016))	Tournament Not Held																		MR		LQ	2R	1R	A
International Championship	Tournament Not Held																A	WD	A	LQ	1R	1R	LQ	A
China Championship	Tournament Not Held																				NR	LQ	LQ	A
English Open	Tournament Not Held																				1R	1R	1R	A
World Open (Note: The event was called the Grand Prix (1992/1993–2000/2001 and 2004/2005–2009/2010), the LG Cup (2001/2002–2003/2004) and the Haikou World Open (2011/2012–2013/2014))	1R	LQ	LQ	1R	A	2R	LQ	LQ	2R	1R	2R	LQ	1R	RR	LQ	A	A	LQ	Not Held		1R	LQ	LQ	A
Northern Ireland Open	Tournament Not Held																				3R	3R	3R	A
UK Championship	LQ	LQ	LQ	LQ	A	LQ	LQ	LQ	3R	LQ	1R	1R	LQ	3R	WD	LQ	A	1R	2R	3R	2R	1R	1R	A
Scottish Open (Note: The event was called the International Open (1992/1993–1996/1997) and the Players Championship (2003/2004))	1R	LQ	LQ	LQ	A	LQ	LQ	LQ	LQ	LQ	WD	Tournament Not Held					MR	Not Held			3R	1R	2R	A
European Masters (Note: The event was called the Irish Open (1998/1999) and Malta Cup (2004/2005–2007/2008))	LQ	LQ	LQ	LQ	NH	LQ	Not Held		LQ	1R	WD	LQ	QF	LQ	NR	Tournament Not Held					1R	LQ	LQ	A
German Masters (Note: The event was called the German Open (1995/1996–1997/1998))	Not Held		LQ	LQ	A	A	Tournament Not Held									WD	A	LQ	LQ	LQ	1R	LQ	LQ	A
World Grand Prix	Tournament Not Held																		NR	DNQ	DNQ	DNQ	DNQ	DNQ
Welsh Open	LQ	LQ	LQ	LQ	A	LQ	LQ	LQ	LQ	QF	1R	1R	LQ	LQ	WD	A	A	A	2R	2R	3R	WD	1R	A
Shoot-Out	Tournament Not Held															Non-Ranking Event					2R	WD	WD	A
Players Championship (Note: The event was called the Players Tour Championship Grand Finals (2011/2012–2012/2013) and the Players Championship Grand Final (2013/2014–2015/2016))	Tournament Not Held															DNQ	DNQ	DNQ	DNQ	DNQ	DNQ	DNQ	DNQ	DNQ
Gibraltar Open	Tournament Not Held																			MR	A	A	3R	A
Tour Championship	Tournament Not Held																						DNQ	DNQ
World Championship	LQ	LQ	LQ	LQ	LQ	LQ	LQ	LQ	1R	LQ	WD	LQ	LQ	WD	WD	A	LQ	1R	1R	LQ	LQ	LQ	LQ	LQ
Non-ranking tournaments
Champion of Champions	Tournament Not Held																	A	A	A	1R	A	A	A
The Masters	LQ	LQ	LQ	LQ	LQ	LQ	LQ	LQ	LQ	LQ	LQ	A	LQ	LQ	LQ	A	A	A	A	A	A	A	A	A
World Seniors Championship	Tournament Not Held																A	A	LQ	A	A	A	A	A
Former ranking tournaments
Dubai Classic (Note: The event was called the Thailand Classic (1995/1996) and the Asian Classic (1996/1997))	LQ	LQ	LQ	LQ	Tournament Not Held																			
Malta Grand Prix	NH	Non-Ranking Event					LQ	NR	Tournament Not Held															
Thailand Masters (Note: The event was called the Asian Open (1992/1993) and the Thailand Open (1993/1994–1996/1997))	A	LQ	LQ	1R	A	LQ	LQ	LQ	LQ	NR	Not Held			NR	Tournament Not Held									
British Open	LQ	LQ	LQ	LQ	LQ	LQ	LQ	LQ	2R	LQ	LQ	1R	Tournament Not Held											
Irish Masters	Non-Ranking Event									LQ	WD	1R	NH	NR	Tournament Not Held									
Northern Ireland Trophy	Tournament Not Held												NR	LQ	LQ	Tournament Not Held								
Wuxi Classic (Note: The event was called the Jiangsu Classic (2008/2009–2009/2010))	Tournament Not Held															NR	A	A	QF	Not Held				
Australian Goldfields Open (Note: The event was called the Australian Open (1994/1995) and the Australian Masters (1995/1996))	NH	NR		Tournament Not Held												LQ	A	A	LQ	A	Not Held			
Shanghai Masters	Tournament Not Held														LQ	LQ	LQ	LQ	LQ	LQ	LQ	LQ	NR	
Paul Hunter Classic (Note: The event was called the Grand Prix Fürth (2004/2005) and the Fürth German Open (2005/2006–2006/2007))	Tournament Not Held											Pro-am Event				Minor-Ranking Event					WD	1R	A	NR
Indian Open	Tournament Not Held																	LQ	1R	NH	1R	1R	1R	NH
China Open (Note: The event was called the China International (1997/1998–1998/1999))	Tournament Not Held				NR	A	LQ	LQ	LQ	Not Held		LQ	LQ	LQ	WD	A	A	A	2R	WD	LQ	LQ	LQ	NH
Former non-ranking tournaments
Belgian Masters	Not Held		1R	Tournament Not Held																				
Finnish Masters	Not Held		1R	Tournament Not Held																				
Malta Masters	Not Held		QF	Tournament Not Held																				
Malaysian Masters	Not Held		QF	Tournament Not Held																				
Malta Grand Prix	NH	A	A	A	A	A	R	LQ	Tournament Not Held															
Scottish Masters	A	A	A	A	A	A	A	A	A	LQ	Tournament Not Held													
Six-red World Championship (Note: The event was called the Six-red Snooker International (2008/2009) and the Six-red World Grand Prix (2009/2010))	Tournament Not Held															NH	A	2R	A	A	A	A	A	A
Shoot-Out	Tournament Not Held															A	A	A	A	W	Ranking Event			

Performance Table Legend
LQ	lost in the qualifying draw	#R	lost in the early rounds of the tournament (WR = Wildcard round, RR = Round robin)	QF	lost in the quarter-finals
SF	lost in the semi-finals	F	lost in the final	W	won the tournament
DNQ	did not qualify for the tournament	A	did not participate in the tournament	WD	withdrew from the tournament

NH / Not Held	means an event was not held.
NR / Non-Ranking Event	means an event is/was no longer a ranking event.
R / Ranking Event	means an event is/was a ranking event.
MR / Minor-Ranking Event	means an event is/was a minor-ranking event.

== Career finals ==
=== Non-ranking finals: 2 (2 titles) ===
Outcome	No.	Year	Championship	Opponent in the final	Score
Winner	1.	2002	WPBSA Open Tour – Event 3	(Republic of Ireland) Colm Gilcreest	5–4
Winner	2.	2016	Snooker Shoot Out	(Belgium) Luca Brecel	1–0

=== Pro-am finals: 1 (1 title) ===
Outcome	No.	Year	Championship	Opponent in the final	Score
Winner	1.	2000	Austrian Open	(England) Matthew Couch	5–1

=== Amateur finals: 12 (11 titles) ===
Outcome	No.	Year	Championship	Opponent in the final	Score
Winner	1.	1992	IBSF World Under-21 Championship	(Belgium) Patrick Delsemme	11–7
Winner	2.	1992	Finnish Amateur Championship	(Finland) Jyri Virtanen	5–0
Runner-up	1.	1993	EBSA European Championship	(England) Neil Mosley	6–8
Winner	3.	1997	EBSA European Championship	(Iceland) Kristján Helgason	7–3
Winner	4.	2005	Finnish Amateur Championship (2)	(Finland) Risto Värynen	5–4
Winner	5.	2009	Finnish Amateur Championship (3)	(Finland) Kimmo Lang	4–0
Winner	6.	2011	Finnish Amateur Championship (4)	(Finland) Antti Mannila	4–0
Winner	7.	2013	Finnish Amateur Championship (5)	(Finland) Kimmo Lang	5–0
Winner	8.	2013	EBSA European Championship (2)	(Wales) Gareth Allen	7–2
Winner	9.	2014	Finnish Amateur Championship (6)	(Finland) Kimmo Lang	5–4
Winner	10.	2018	Finnish Amateur Championship (7)	(Finland) Antti Tolvanen	4–1
Winner	11.	2020	Finnish Amateur Championship (8)	(Finland) Heikki Niva	4–0
