= 2014 World Snooker Championship =

Professional snooker tournament

2014 Dafabet World Snooker Championship
Tournament information
- Dates: 19 April – 5 May 2014
- Venue: Crucible Theatre
- City: Sheffield
- Country: England
- Organisation: World Snooker
- Format: Ranking event
- Total prize fund: £1,214,000
- Winner's share: £300,000
- Highest break: Neil Robertson (AUS) (140)

Final
- Champion: Mark Selby (ENG)
- Runner-up: Ronnie O'Sullivan (ENG)
- Score: 18–14

The 2014 World Snooker Championship (officially the 2014 Dafabet World Snooker Championship) was a professional snooker tournament that took place from 19 April to 5 May 2014 at the Crucible Theatre in Sheffield, England. It was the 38th consecutive year that the World Snooker Championship had been held at the Crucible. The tournament was also the last ranking event of the 2013–14 snooker season. The event was sponsored by Dafabet for the first time. A qualifying tournament was held from 8 to 16 April 2014 at the Ponds Forge International Sports Centre in Sheffield for 16 players, who met 16 seeded participants at the main championships.

Ronnie O'Sullivan was the defending champion, having won the previous year's event by defeating Barry Hawkins in the final. Mark Selby won the 2014 event to capture his first world title by defeating O'Sullivan 18–14 in the final. This was Selby's fourth ranking title, also completing the Triple Crown of World Championship, UK Championship, and Masters titles. Neil Robertson compiled the highest break of the tournament, a 140, and scored his 100th century break of the season in his quarter-final win over Judd Trump. The event featured a prize fund of £1,214,000, the winner receiving £300,000.

== Background ==
The 2014 World Snooker Championship featured 32 professional players competing in one-on-one snooker matches in a single-elimination format, each match played over several frames. These 32 players for the event were selected through a mix of the snooker world rankings and a pre-tournament qualification round. The first World Snooker Championship took place in 1927, with the final held at Camkin's Hall in Birmingham, England, and the title was won by Joe Davis. Since 1977, the event has been held at the Crucible Theatre in Sheffield, England. As of 2022, Stephen Hendry and Ronnie O’Sullivan are the event's most successful participants in the modern era, having both won the championship seven times. The defending champion was Ronnie O'Sullivan, who had won the 2013 event, defeating Barry Hawkins in the final to take his fifth title. The winner of the 2014 championship received £300,000, from a total prize fund of £1,214,000. The event was organised by World Snooker in partnership with the World Professional Billiards and Snooker Association (WPBSA).

=== Format ===
The 2014 World Snooker Championship was a professional snooker tournament played from 19 April to 5 May 2014 at the Crucible Theatre in Sheffield, England. This was the 38th consecutive year that the World Snooker Championship was held at the Crucible Theatre. Of the 32 participants, 16 players qualified for the event from the snooker world rankings, and 16 from a four-round qualifying event held at Ponds Forge International Sports Centre in Sheffield, England. The event was the last of twelve ranking events in the 2013–14 snooker season on the World Snooker Tour. The tournament was sponsored by sports betting company Dafabet for the first time, replacing previous sponsors Betfair.

=== Prize fund ===
The total prize money for the 2014 World Snooker Championship was £1,214,000, a raise from the previous year's £1,111,000. The winner received £300,000, an increase of £50,000 over the previous year. The breakdown of prize money for the 2014 event is shown below:

- Winner: £300,000
- Runner-up: £125,000
- Semi-final: £55,000
- Quarter-final: £25,000
- Last 16: £16,000
- Last 32: £12,000
- Last 48: £8,500
- Last 64: £5,000
- Last 96: £1,000
- Non-televised highest break: £1,000
- Televised highest break: £10,000
- Total: £1,214,000

== Tournament summary ==
=== Qualifying ===
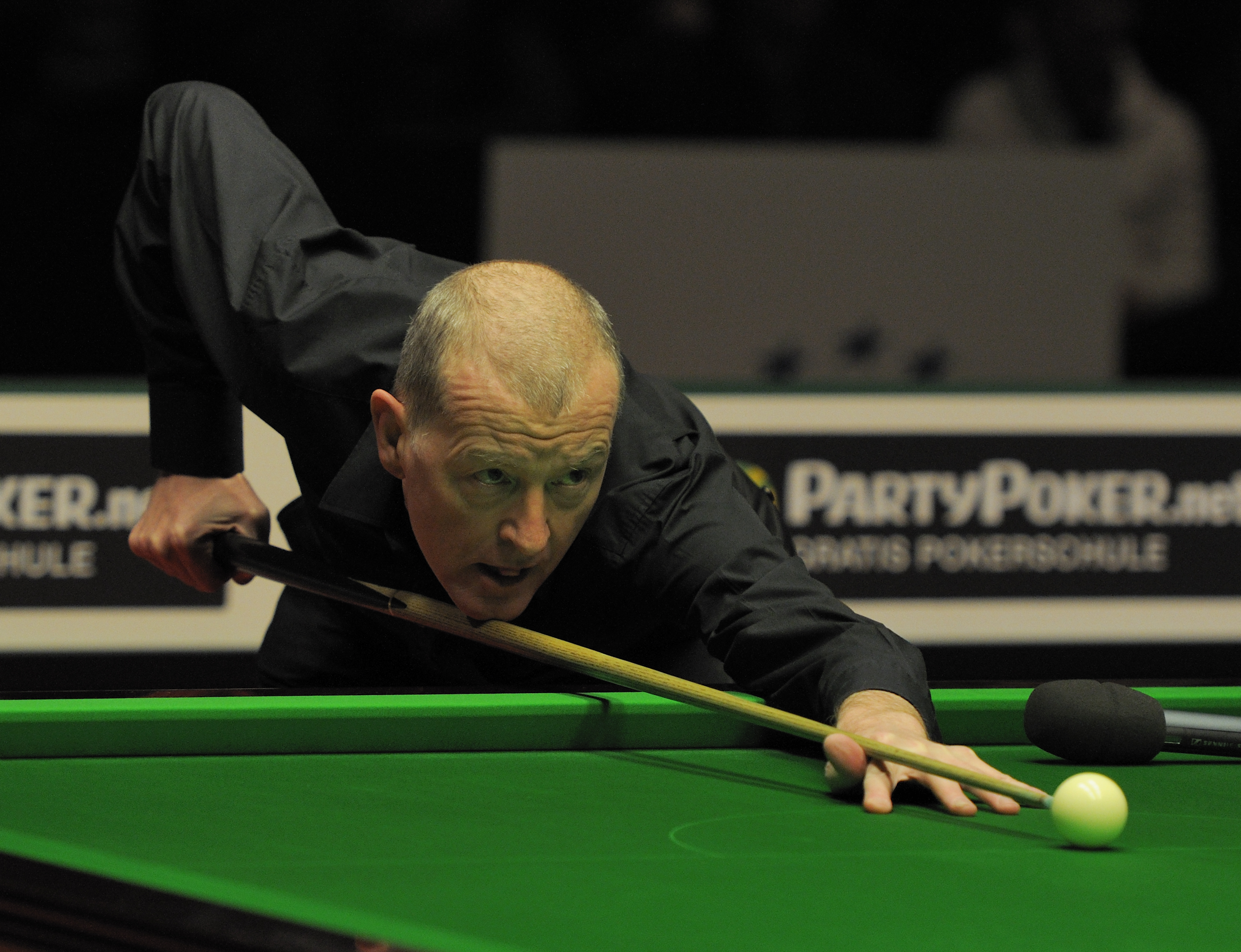
Six-time champion Steve Davis (pictured in 2012) lost in qualifying, failing to retain his place on the World Snooker Tour for the next season.

Four former world champions lost in the qualifying rounds. Six-time champion Steve Davis was defeated by Craig Steadman, a match Davis needed to win to retain his place on the World Snooker Tour. Two-time champion Mark Williams lost to Alan McManus in the final qualifying round 8–10 and failed to play at the main championship for the first time since 1996. Graeme Dott lost to Kyren Wilson 7–10, whilst Peter Ebdon lost 8–10 to Robin Hull. The loss for Ebdon meant that he ended 22 consecutive appearances at the event since his debut in 1992. Two previous runners-up also did not qualify. Six-time finalist Jimmy White lost in the second qualifying round to Ian Burns 10–4, whilst two-time runner-up Matthew Stevens lost to Tom Ford.

For the first time, no Welsh player automatically qualified to play at the Crucible. Three Welshmen, Dominic Dale, Michael White, and Ryan Day, won places in the first round through qualification. At the age of 44, 1997 champion Ken Doherty defeated Dechawat Poomjaeng 10–5 in qualifying to become the oldest player to reach the main stage. Kyren Wilson, Michael Wasley, Xiao Guodong, and Robbie Williams all made their debuts in the competition by coming through qualifying.

=== First round ===
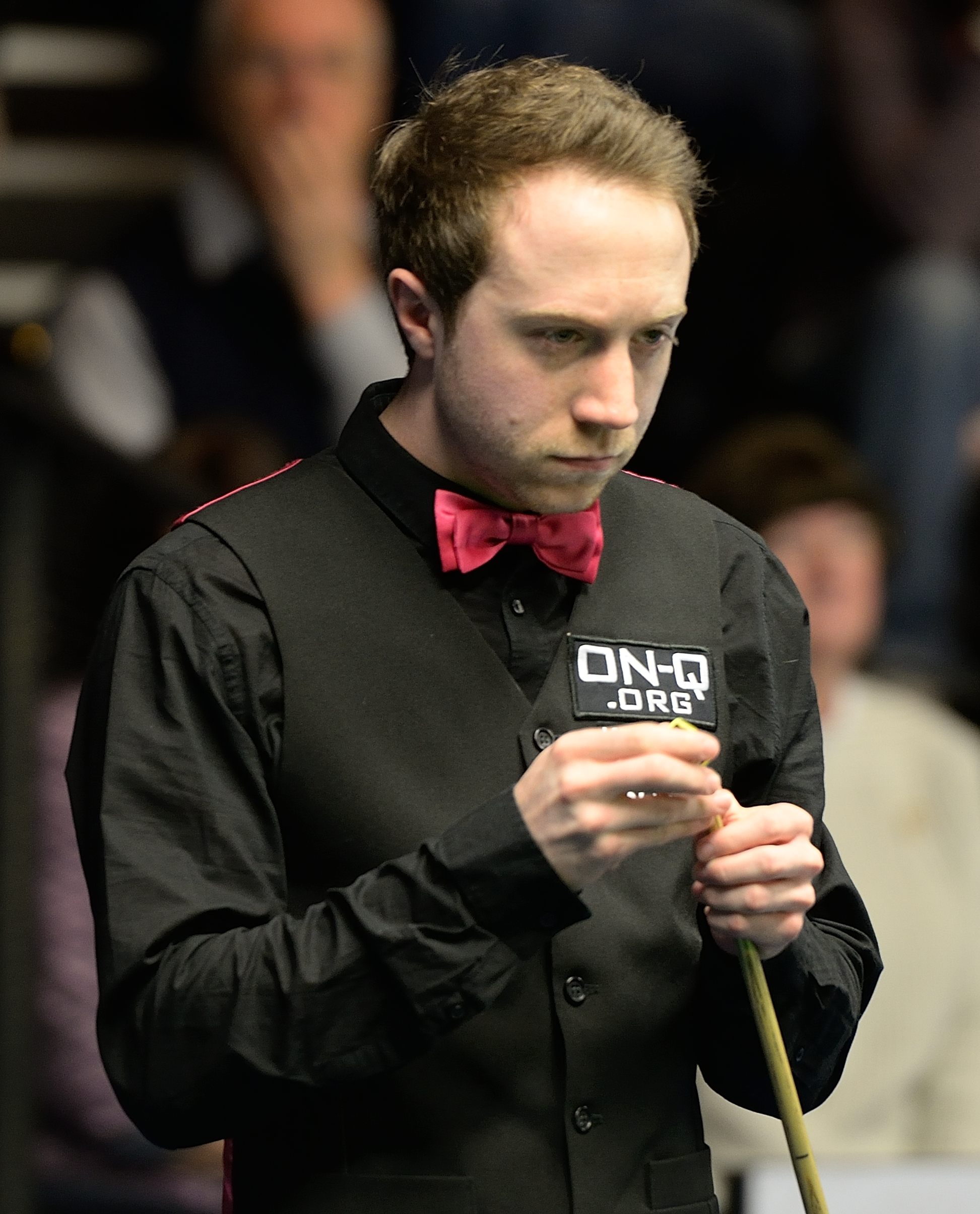
Debutant Michael Wasley (pictured in 2015) defeated fourth seed Ding Junhui 10–9 in the opening round.

The first round was played as best-of-19 frame matches held over two sessions between 19 and 24 April 2014. Defending champion Ronnie O'Sullivan drew world number 122 Robin Hull in the first round, and won 10–4. The 2010 World Snooker Championship winner Neil Robertson won his first round match against Robbie Williams, leading 7–2 after the first session, and won 10–2. In his victory, he compiled breaks of 102, 102, 103, 132, and the tournament's highest of 140 to take his season total of century breaks to 97. The 2005 champion Shaun Murphy trailed 5–7 behind against Jamie Cope, before the pair played a deciding frame at 9–9. Murphy took the frame 65–49 to win the match. Third seed Mark Selby also won a deciding frame, as he defeated Michael White 10–9.

Fourth seed Ding Junhui had previously won five ranking events in the season, a record he jointly held with Stephen Hendry. In his first round match he was defeated 9–10 by debutant Michael Wasley, and so failed to set a new record for tournament wins in a season. Ken Doherty won the last seven frames of his match against sixth seed Stuart Bingham to win 10–5, recording his first victory at the event since 2006. Alan McManus achieved his first Crucible win since 2005 by defeating fellow Scot John Higgins 10–7, while Dominic Dale won his first Crucible match since 2000 by defeating 13th seed Mark Davis 10–5. The final frame of Ricky Walden's first-round match against Kyren Wilson lasted 73 minutes 13 seconds, just under two minutes short of the Crucible record of 74 minutes 58 seconds that Stephen Maguire and Mark King set in 2009. Walden won the frame to clinch a 10–7 victory. Qualifier Ryan Day defeated tenth seed Stephen Maguire 10–9.

During the first round, a "Ladies' Day" at the tournament featured events designed to encourage greater female participation in the sport. The day was also used to raise money for the Bluebell Wood Children's Hospice in Rotherham.

=== Second round ===
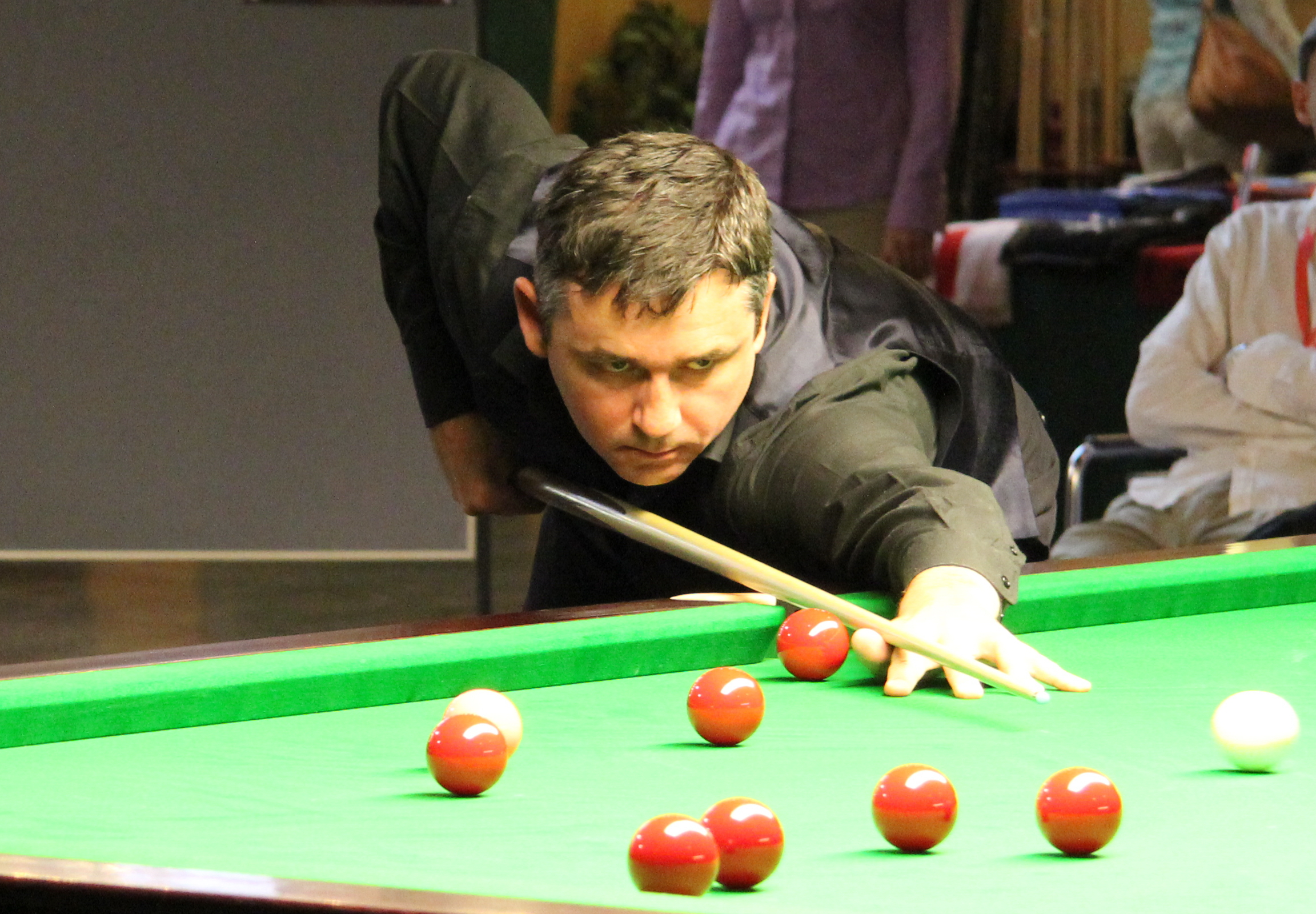
Alan McManus (pictured in 2011) reached his first quarter-final at the event since 2005 by defeating Ken Doherty 13–8.

The second round was played as best-of-25 frame matches over three sessions between 25 and 28 April 2014. O'Sullivan trailed Joe Perry throughout the first two sessions of their match, but ultimately won 13–11. O'Sullivan described the encounter with Perry as "probably my most exciting match ever at the Crucible." McManus played Doherty and won six frames in a row from 4–3 ahead to lead 10–3, and later won 13–8. This was McManus' first quarter-final appearance since 2005, when he also beat Doherty in the second round. Murphy led Marco Fu 9–7 after the first two sessions, before winning four of the next five frames to win 13–8.

Dale defeated Wasley 13–4 to reach his first World Championship quarter-final since 2000. In defeating Mark Allen 13–7, Robertson added two more century breaks to bring his season total to 99. In the last two frames he made breaks of 94 and 92, narrowly missing his 100th century of the season. Barry Hawkins met Walden in a repeat of the previous year's semi-final. Hawkins won again, this time 13–11, to reach his second Crucible quarter-final. Selby led Ali Carter 9–7 after the first two sessions, and won three frames in a row to lead 12–7. Carter won the next two frames before Selby won the 20th frame by 82 points to 19 to win 13–9. In the last second round match, seventh seed Judd Trump defeated Day 13–7.

=== Quarter-finals ===
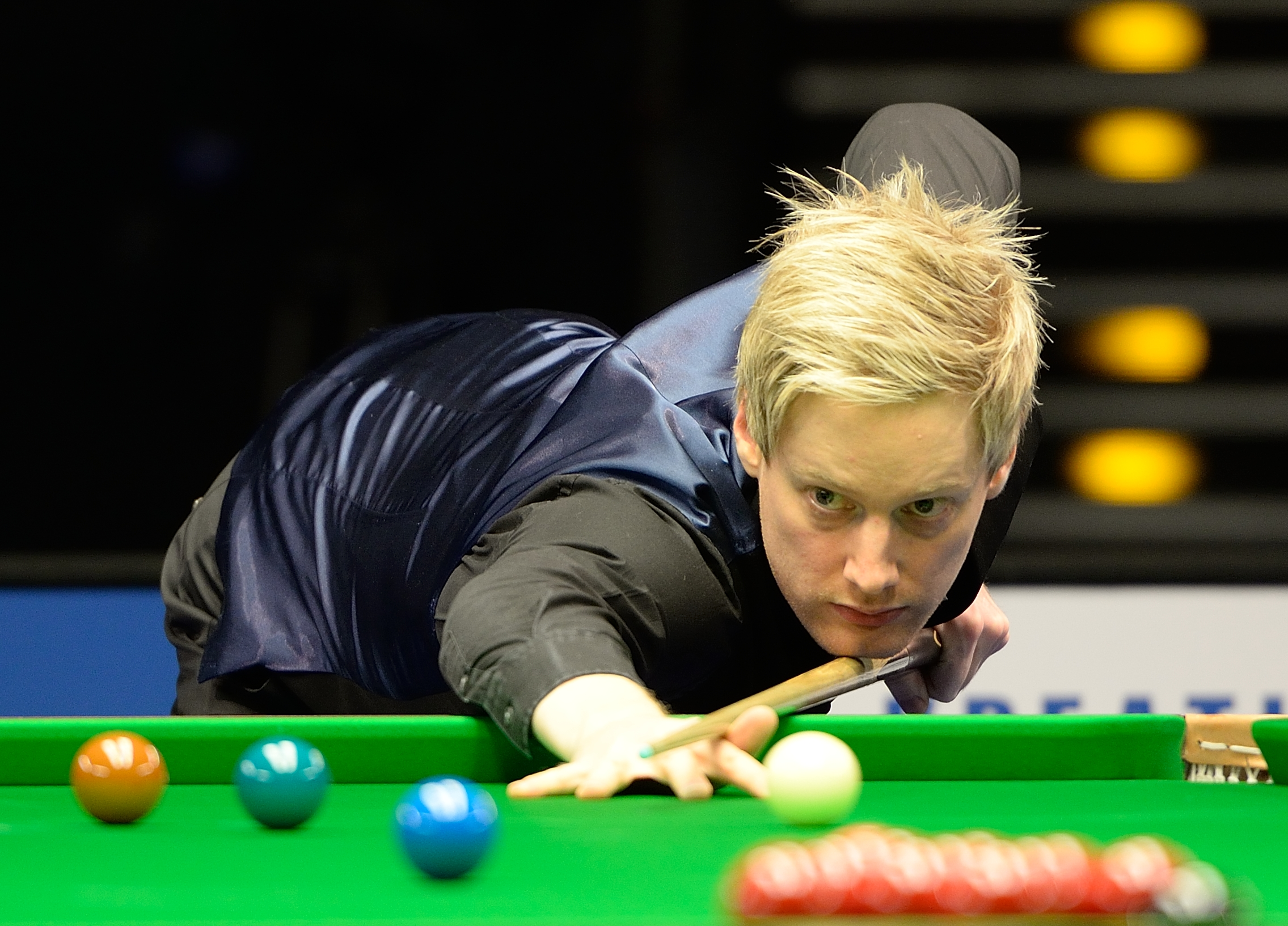
Neil Robertson (pictured in 2015) scored his 100th century of the season in his 13–11 win over Judd Trump.

The quarter-finals were played as best-of-25 frame matches across three sessions between 29 and 30 April. Selby and McManus only completed seven of the scheduled eight frames in the first session of their match as they ran out of time, with Selby leading 4–3. Selby won eight of the nine in the second session to lead 12–4, and won the second frame of the final session to win 13–5. Having trailed 0–2 and needing three snookers in the third frame, O'Sullivan won 13 of the last 14 frames to defeat Shaun Murphy 13–3, ending the match with a session to spare.

Hawkins opened up a 6–2 lead over Dominic Dale in the first session, and extended his lead to 11–5 after two sessions. In the final session, Dale fought back to win seven frames in a row and take the lead 12–11, but Hawkins captured the last two frames to win the match 13–12. Neil Robertson trailed Judd Trump 2–6 after the first session, and 6–9 after the second, before he won seven of the last nine frames to win the match 13–11. In the 22nd frame, Robertson compiled his 100th century break of the 2013–14 snooker season.

=== Semi-finals ===
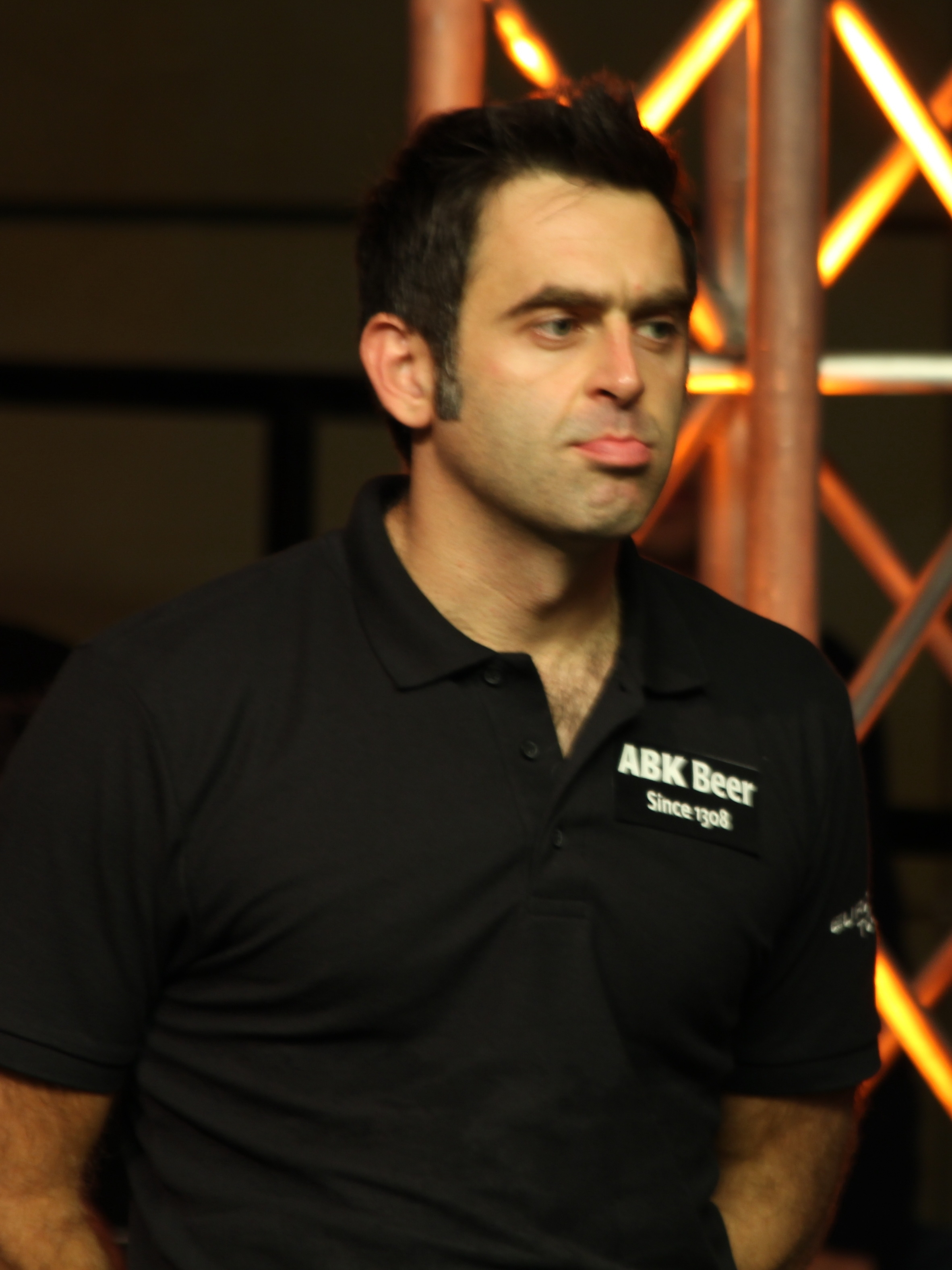
Ronnie O'Sullivan (pictured in 2013) won two matches with a session to spare for the first time since 2004.

The semi-finals were played as best-of-33 frame matches over four sessions on 2 and 3 May. O'Sullivan and Hawkins contested the first semi-final, a rematch of the previous year's final. O'Sullivan led at 10–2, but Hawkins won three of the next four to trail overnight 11–5. O'Sullivan made breaks of 76, 55, 103 and 84 and later won the match 17–7 in the final frame of the third session. This was the first time in ten years that a player had won two matches with a session to spare in the same event, having done so himself previously in 2004. That year, O'Sullivan won the championship one frame into the final session.

In the second semi-final, a match that lasted 12 hours and 4 minutes, Selby defeated Robertson 17–15 to reach his second World Championship final. Selby had previously reached the final once before in 2007. During the match, Robertson extended his century break record to 103, but his defeat meant that he lost his world number one position.

=== Final ===
The final was played on the 4 and 5 May 2014 between Ronnie O'Sullivan and Mark Selby as best-of-35 frames, held over four sessions and was refereed by Brendan Moore. This was the first time that Moore had presided over a World Championship final. In the first session on Sunday afternoon, O'Sullivan took a 5–3 lead, which he extended in the evening session to 8–3 and 10–5. Selby took the last two frames of the day to leave O'Sullivan with a 10–7 overnight lead. O'Sullivan's highest break on the first day was a 131 in the 14th frame, while Selby's highest break of the day was just 62.

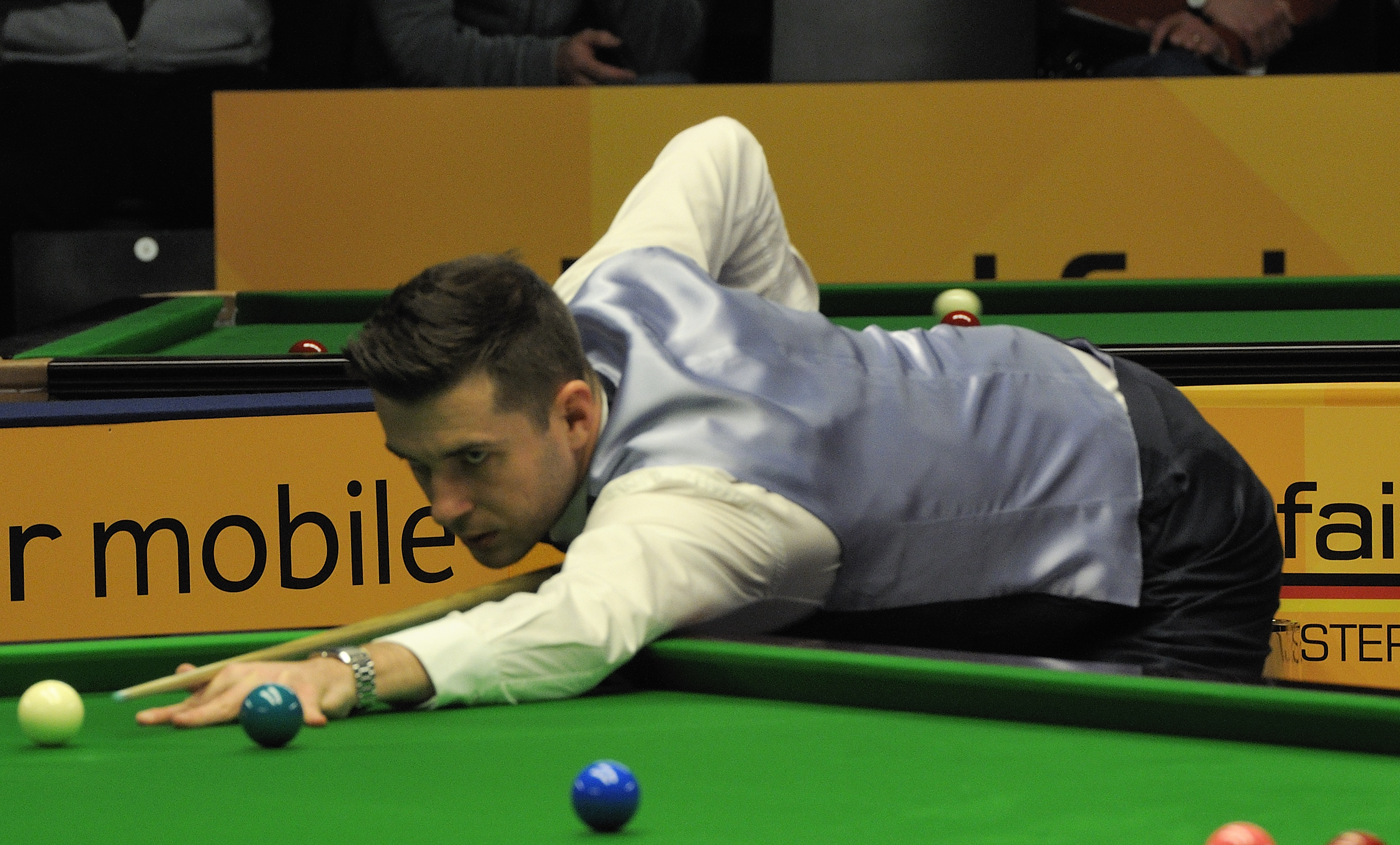
Mark Selby (pictured in 2013) won his first world title, defeating Ronnie O'Sullivan 18–14 in the final.

The third session concluded after just six of the scheduled eight frames. Selby won five of the six frames to go into the final session with a 12–11 lead. He then won three of the first four frames of the evening session, extending his lead to 15–12 at the mid-session interval, before winning the final 18–14 to capture his first world title. In all, Selby won 13 of the last 17 frames, and scored his two highest breaks of the match in frames 30 and 31 to increase his lead from 15–14 to 17–14. This was Selby's fourth ranking title, and made him the ninth player to win all three Triple Crown events, reinstating him as the world number one.

O'Sullivan said "I want to congratulate Mark on a fantastic tournament. He's been the best player over 17 days ... In the end I was numb as he was too strong and tough." Selby dedicated the title to his late father, who died two months before he turned professional.

== Main draw ==
The draw for the first round took place on 17 April 2014, one day after the qualifying, and was broadcast live on World Snooker's YouTube channel at 12 pm BST. The numbers in parentheses beside some of the players are their seeding ranks, whilst players in bold denote match winners. Below are the full results from the event.

**First round** Best of 19 frames
19 April
**Ronnie O'Sullivan (ENG) (1)**	**10**
Robin Hull (FIN)	4
20 & 21 April
**Joe Perry (ENG) (16)**	**10**
Jamie Burnett (SCO)	7
19 & 20 April
**Shaun Murphy (ENG) (9)**	**10**
Jamie Cope (ENG)	9
22 & 23 April
**Marco Fu (HKG) (8)**	**10**
Martin Gould (ENG)	7
22 & 23 April
**Barry Hawkins (ENG) (5)**	**10**
David Gilbert (ENG)	4
21 & 22 April
**Ricky Walden (ENG) (12)**	**10**
Kyren Wilson (ENG)	7
23 & 24 April
Mark Davis (ENG) (13)	5
**Dominic Dale (WAL)**	**10**
20 & 21 April
Ding Junhui (CHN) (4)	9
**Michael Wasley (ENG)**	**10**
21 April
**Mark Selby (ENG) (3)**	**10**
Michael White (WAL)	9
19 & 20 April
**Ali Carter (ENG) (14)**	**10**
Xiao Guodong (CHN)	8
21 & 22 April
John Higgins (SCO) (11)	7
**Alan McManus (SCO)**	**10**
19 & 20 April
Stuart Bingham (ENG) (6)	5
**Ken Doherty (IRL)**	**10**
22 & 23 April
**Judd Trump (ENG) (7)**	**10**
Tom Ford (ENG)	8
19 & 20 April
Stephen Maguire (SCO) (10)	9
**Ryan Day (WAL)**	**10**
22 & 23 April
**Mark Allen (NIR) (15)**	**10**
Michael Holt (ENG)	4
23 & 24 April
**Neil Robertson (AUS) (2)**	**10**
Robbie Williams (ENG)	2

**Second round** Best of 25 frames
24, 25 & 26 April
(England) **Ronnie O'Sullivan (1)**	**13**
(England) Joe Perry (16)	11
27 & 28 April
(England) **Shaun Murphy (9)**	**13**
(Hong Kong) Marco Fu (8)	8
25 & 26 April
(England) **Barry Hawkins (5)**	**13**
(England) Ricky Walden (12)	11
26, 27 & 28 April
(Wales) **Dominic Dale**	**13**
(England) Michael Wasley	4
24 & 25 April
(England) **Mark Selby (3)**	**13**
(England) Ali Carter (14)	9
25 & 26 April
(Scotland) **Alan McManus**	**13**
(Republic of Ireland) Ken Doherty	8
26, 27 & 28 April
(England) **Judd Trump (7)**	**13**
(Wales) Ryan Day	7
27 & 28 April
(Northern Ireland) Mark Allen (15)	7
(Australia) **Neil Robertson (2)**	**13**

**Quarter-finals**; Best of 25 frames
29 & 30 April
(England) **Ronnie O'Sullivan (1)**	**13**
(England) Shaun Murphy (9)	3
29 & 30 April
(England) **Barry Hawkins (5)**	**13**
(Wales) Dominic Dale	12
29 & 30 April
(England) **Mark Selby (3)**	**13**
(Scotland) Alan McManus	5
29 & 30 April
(England) Judd Trump (7)	11
(Australia) **Neil Robertson (2)**	**13**

**Semi-finals**; Best of 33 frames
1 & 2 May
(England) **Ronnie O'Sullivan (1)**	**17**
(England) Barry Hawkins (5)	7
1, 2 & 3 May
(England) **Mark Selby (3)**	**17**
(Australia) Neil Robertson (2)	15

**Final**; Best of 35 frames
4 & 5 May
(England) Ronnie O'Sullivan (1)	14
(England) **Mark Selby (3)**	**18**

Final: (Best of 35 frames) Crucible Theatre, Sheffield, 4 & 5 May. Referee: Brendan Moore
Ronnie O'Sullivan (1); England				14–**18**			**Mark Selby (3)**; England			
Session 1: 5–3
Frame	1	2	3	4	5	6	7	8	9	10
O'Sullivan	**77**^{†} (69)	**64**^{†}	**102**^{†} (102)	28	47	**80**^{†} (63)	36	**66**^{†}	N/A	N/A
Selby	0	26	0	**69**^{†}	**68**^{†}	8	**72**^{†}	54	N/A	N/A
Session 2: 10–7
Frame	1	2	3	4	5	6	7	8	9	10
O'Sullivan	**99**^{†}	**70**^{†} (52)	**67**^{†} (63)	25	45	**131**^{†} (131)	**87**^{†} (87)	9	9	N/A
Selby	24	47	27	**82**^{†} (55)	**96**	0	0	**84**^{†} (58)	**78**^{†} (62)	N/A
Session 3: 11–12
Frame	1	2	3	4	5	6	7	8	9	10
O'Sullivan	35	23	7	29	**76**^{†} (50)	67	N/A (Note: Frames 24 and 25 were scheduled for the third session but were not played due to time constraints, and were carried over to the final session.)	N/A	N/A	N/A
Selby	**81**^{†} (55)	**77**^{†} (52)	**84**^{†} (74)	**89**^{†}	38	**70**^{†}	N/A	N/A	N/A	N/A
Session 4: 14–18
Frame	1	2	3	4	5	6	7	8	9	10
O'Sullivan	**100**^{†} (100)	24	39	4	**79**^{†}	**66**^{†}	0	14	56	N/A
Selby	0	**67**^{†}	**64**^{†}	**90**^{†} (56)	0	47	**131**^{†} (127)	**87**^{†} (87)	**62**^{†}	N/A
**131**				Highest break			127			
**3**				Century breaks			1			
**14**				50+ breaks			13			
Numbers in parentheses indicate breaks of 50 or more. † = Winner of frame

== Qualifying ==
The qualifying rounds 1–3 for the tournament took place between 8 and 13 April 2014 at the Ponds Forge International Sports Centre in Sheffield, England. The final round of qualifying took place on 15 and 16 April 2014 at the same venue. This was the first snooker event held at the venue.

Round 1 Best of 19 frames
(China) Zhang Anda	10
(Wales) Andrew Pagett	2
(England) Craig Steadman	10
(Wales) Jak Jones	7
(England) Liam Highfield	10
(Libya) Khaled Belaid Abumdas	2
(Thailand) Thanawat Thirapongpaiboon	10
(England) Sanderson Lam	8
(England) Barry Pinches	10
(England) Hammad Miah	3
(England) Kyren Wilson	10
(England) Chris Norbury	6
(England) Martin O'Donnell	10
(England) Shane Castle	1
(Wales) Daniel Wells	10
(England) Ryan Clark	9
(England) Jamie O'Neill	9
(China) Cao Xinlong	10
(England) Paul Davison	10
(England) Chris Wakelin	9
(Scotland) Michael Leslie	6
(England) Christopher Keogan	10
(England) Joel Walker	10
(England) Allan Taylor	8
(Thailand) James Wattana	9
(Malta) Alex Borg	10
(England) Sam Baird	9
(England) John Astley	10
(England) Gary Wilson	4
(England) James Cahill	10
(Belgium) Luca Brecel	10
(England) Lee Page	8
(China) Chen Zhe	10
(England) Antony Parsons	8
(England) Michael Wasley	10
(England) Sydney Wilson	9
(England) Robbie Williams	10
(China) Lyu Haotian	8
(China) Li Hang	10
(Thailand) Ratchayothin Yotharuck	5
(Malta) Tony Drago	3
(Finland) Robin Hull	10
(England) Ian Burns	10
(Scotland) Fraser Patrick	6
(England) Sean O'Sullivan	9
(England) Mitchell Travis	10
(England) Adam Duffy	4
(Brazil) Igor Figueiredo	10
(Thailand) Noppon Saengkham	9
(Australia) Vinnie Calabrese	10
(Scotland) Scott Donaldson	10
(Qatar) Ahmed Saif	6
(England) Stuart Carrington	10
(England) Andrew Norman	5
(England) David Grace	6
(Scotland) Ross Muir	10
(England) Mike Dunn	2
(Scotland) Rhys Clark	10
(Republic of Ireland) David Morris	7
(Switzerland) Alexander Ursenbacher	10
(England) Alex Davies	7
(Northern Ireland) Joe Swail	10
(China) Li Yan	10
(England) Elliot Slessor	5

Round 2 Best of 19 frames
(Thailand) Dechawat Poomjaeng	10
(China) Zhang Anda	8
(England) Steve Davis	8
(England) Craig Steadman	10
(England) Jimmy Robertson	10
(England) Liam Highfield	7
(Scotland) Anthony McGill	10
(Thailand) Thanawat Thirapongpaiboon	7
(England) Alfie Burden	10
(England) Barry Pinches	4
(England) Rod Lawler	3
(England) Kyren Wilson	10
(England) Andrew Higginson	10
(England) Martin O'Donnell	5
(Norway) Kurt Maflin	10
(Wales) Daniel Wells	7
(England) Peter Lines	10
(China) Cao Xinlong	9
(Scotland) Alan McManus	10
(England) Paul Davison	2
(India) Aditya Mehta	10
(England) Christopher Keogan	4
(Wales) Jamie Jones	10
(England) Joel Walker	9
(Scotland) Marcus Campbell	4
(Malta) Alex Borg	10
(England) Jamie Cope	10
(England) John Astley	2
(England) Tom Ford	10
(England) James Cahill	6
(China) Yu Delu	7
(Belgium) Luca Brecel	10
(England) Mark Joyce	10
(China) Chen Zhe	8
(England) Rory McLeod	6
(England) Michael Wasley	10
(China) Liu Chuang	5
(England) Robbie Williams	10
(India) Pankaj Advani	10
(China) Li Hang	9
(China) Tian Pengfei	6
(Finland) Robin Hull	10
(England) Jimmy White	4
(England) Ian Burns	10
(England) Martin Gould	10
(England) Mitchell Travis	1
(Northern Ireland) Gerard Greene	8
(Brazil) Igor Figueiredo	10
(Scotland) Jamie Burnett	10
(Australia) Vinnie Calabrese	4
(China) Cao Yupeng	10
(Scotland) Scott Donaldson	5
(England) Jack Lisowski	7
(England) Stuart Carrington	10
(England) Nigel Bond	10
(Scotland) Ross Muir	5
(England) Matthew Selt	10
(Scotland) Rhys Clark	6
(Thailand) Thepchaiya Un-Nooh	10
(Switzerland) Alexander Ursenbacher	5
(England) Anthony Hamilton	7
(Northern Ireland) Joe Swail	10
(England) Dave Harold	3
(China) Li Yan	10

Round 3 Best of 19 frames
(Thailand) Dechawat Poomjaeng	10
(England) Craig Steadman	6
(England) Jimmy Robertson	10
(Scotland) Anthony McGill	9
(England) Alfie Burden	3
(England) Kyren Wilson	10
(England) Andrew Higginson	10
(Norway) Kurt Maflin	3
(England) Peter Lines	8
(Scotland) Alan McManus	10
(India) Aditya Mehta	5
(Wales) Jamie Jones	10
(Malta) Alex Borg	7
(England) Jamie Cope	10
(England) Tom Ford	10
(Belgium) Luca Brecel	1
(England) Mark Joyce	6
(England) Michael Wasley	10
(England) Robbie Williams	10
(India) Pankaj Advani	7
(Finland) Robin Hull	10
(England) Ian Burns	4
(England) Martin Gould	10
(Brazil) Igor Figueiredo	1
(Scotland) Jamie Burnett	10
(China) Cao Yupeng	8
(England) Stuart Carrington	10
(England) Nigel Bond	5
(England) Matthew Selt	10
(Thailand) Thepchaiya Un-Nooh	2
(Northern Ireland) Joe Swail	8
(China) Li Yan	10

Round 4 Best of 19 frames
(Republic of Ireland) Ken Doherty	10
(Thailand) Dechawat Poomjaeng	5
(England) David Gilbert	10
(England) Jimmy Robertson	6
(Scotland) Graeme Dott	7
(England) Kyren Wilson	10
(Wales) Dominic Dale	10
(England) Andrew Higginson	6
(Wales) Mark Williams	8
(Scotland) Alan McManus	10
(England) Michael Holt	10
(Wales) Jamie Jones	6
(England) Mark King	7
(England) Jamie Cope	10
(Wales) Matthew Stevens	8
(England) Tom Ford	10
(England) Robert Milkins	9
(England) Michael Wasley	10
(Republic of Ireland) Fergal O'Brien	9
(England) Robbie Williams	10
(England) Peter Ebdon	8
(Finland) Robin Hull	10
(China) Liang Wenbo	7
(England) Martin Gould	10
(England) Ben Woollaston	8
(Scotland) Jamie Burnett	10
(Wales) Ryan Day	10
(England) Stuart Carrington	5
(Wales) Michael White	10
(England) Matthew Selt	7
(China) Xiao Guodong	10
(China) Li Yan	1

== Century breaks ==
=== Televised stage centuries ===
There were 58 century breaks in the televised stage of the World Championship. For every century break made during the main tournament, Dafabet, donated £100 to the Bluebell Wood Children's Hospice. Neil Robertson made the highest break of the event, a 140.

- 140, 137, 132, 130, 113, 108, 103, 102, 101, 100 – Neil Robertson
- 137, 112, 109 – Ricky Walden
- 136, 131, 124, 124, 118, 117, 113, 112, 108, 106, 103, 102, 100 – Ronnie O'Sullivan
- 136, 124, 116, 109 – Marco Fu
- 136 – Ding Junhui
- 135, 108, 103 – Michael Wasley
- 134, 115, 106, 104 – Barry Hawkins
- 134 – Stephen Maguire
- 133, 127, 110, 109, 104 – Mark Selby
- 130, 107 – Ryan Day
- 117, 107 – Judd Trump
- 112, 102, 101 – Shaun Murphy
- 111 – Jamie Burnett
- 111 – John Higgins
- 110, 102 – Ali Carter
- 107 – Alan McManus
- 106 – Dominic Dale
- 102 – Robin Hull

=== Qualifying stage centuries ===
There were 69 century breaks in the qualifying stage of the World Championship. The highest was 139 by both Martin O'Donnell and Andrew Higginson.

- 139, 119, 100 – Martin O'Donnell
- 139 – Andrew Higginson
- 137, 134, 132, 114, 113, 106 – Martin Gould
- 135 – Fergal O'Brien
- 134 – Kurt Maflin
- 133, 107, 102 – Robin Hull
- 133 – Chen Zhe
- 132, 131, 121 – Ian Burns
- 132, 100 – Sam Baird
- 130 – Alan McManus
- 128, 121, 117 – Thanawat Thirapongpaiboon
- 127 – Liu Chuang
- 125, 103 – Jamie Cope
- 123 – Ross Muir
- 122 – Craig Steadman
- 122 – Michael Wasley
- 120, 116, 104 – Li Hang
- 119, 114 – Kyren Wilson
- 119 – Xiao Guodong
- 118 – Luca Brecel
- 118 – David Morris
- 117, 102, 102 – Cao Xinlong
- 117 – Alexander Ursenbacher
- 116, 107 – Sanderson Lam
- 113 – Stuart Carrington
- 112 – Li Yan
- 111, 104 – Matthew Selt
- 111, 101 – Tom Ford
- 111 – Chris Norbury
- 111 – Zhang Anda
- 111 – Igor Figueiredo
- 110 – Alex Borg
- 110 – Robbie Williams
- 109 – Noppon Saengkham
- 108, 101 – Jamie Jones
- 108 – Yu Delu
- 106 – James Cahill
- 106 – Ryan Day
- 105 – Jimmy Robertson
- 103 – Liang Wenbo
- 102 – Rod Lawler
- 101 – Alfie Burden
- 101 – Mark Joyce
- 100 – Ken Doherty
- 100 – Michael White
