= 2017 German Masters =

2017 F66.com German Masters
Tournament information
- Dates: 1–5 February 2017
- Venue: Tempodrom
- City: Berlin
- Country: Germany
- Organisation: World Snooker
- Format: Ranking event
- Total prize fund: €367,000
- Winner's share: €80,000
- Highest break: Tom Ford (ENG) (147)

Final
- Champion: Anthony Hamilton (ENG)
- Runner-up: Ali Carter (ENG)
- Score: 9–6

The 2017 German Masters (officially the 2017 F66.com German Masters) was a professional ranking snooker tournament that took place between 1–5 February 2017 at the Tempodrom in Berlin, Germany. It was the twelfth ranking event of the 2016/2017 season.

Martin Gould was the defending champion but he lost 2–6 against Ali Carter in the semi-finals.

Tom Ford made the 128th official maximum break and the third of his career in the second frame of his 5–2 win over Peter Ebdon in the first round. Maximum breaks had already been made in the qualifying rounds by both Ali Carter and Ross Muir.

Anthony Hamilton defeated Carter 9–6 to capture his first ranking title in his 26-year career, having trailed 2–5. At the age of 45, he also became the oldest ranking event winner since Doug Mountjoy was 46 winning the Classic in 1989.

== Prize fund ==
The breakdown of prize money for this year is shown below:

- Winner: €80,000
- Runner-up: €35,000
- Semi-final: €20,000
- Quarter-final: €10,000
- Last 16: €5,000
- Last 32: €4,000
- Last 64: €2,000
- Highest break: €4,000
- Total: €367,000

The "rolling 147 prize" for a maximum break stood at £10,000 (€13,300).

== Main draw ==
Last 32; Best of 9 frames
Martin Gould (ENG)	5
Jamie Jones (WAL)	0
John Astley (ENG)	4
Ricky Walden (ENG)	5
Ryan Day (WAL)	5
Mark Allen (NIR)	1
Robin Hull (FIN)	5
Jimmy White (ENG)	4
Tom Ford (ENG)	5
Peter Ebdon (ENG)	2
Ronnie O'Sullivan (ENG)	4
Mark King (ENG)	5
Stephen Maguire (SCO)	1
Ali Carter (ENG)	5
Sunny Akani (THA)	0
Zhao Xintong (CHN)	5
Stuart Bingham (ENG)	5
Zhang Yong (CHN)	3
Marco Fu (HKG)	3
David Gilbert (ENG)	5
Michael Holt (ENG)	5
Stuart Carrington (ENG)	1
Dominic Dale (WAL)	2
Yan Bingtao (CHN)	5
Neil Robertson (AUS)	4
Ben Woollaston (ENG)	5
Barry Hawkins (ENG)	5
Michael White (WAL)	1
Anthony Hamilton (ENG)	5
Mark Williams (WAL)	3
Thepchaiya Un-Nooh (THA)	0
Mark Selby (ENG)	5

Last 16; Best of 9 frames
(England) Martin Gould	5
(England) Ricky Walden	3
(Wales) Ryan Day	5
(Finland) Robin Hull	4
(England) Tom Ford	5
(England) Mark King	2
(England) Ali Carter	5
(China) Zhao Xintong	4
(England) Stuart Bingham	5
(England) David Gilbert	4
(England) Michael Holt	1
(China) Yan Bingtao	5
(England) Ben Woollaston	2
(England) Barry Hawkins	5
(England) Anthony Hamilton	5
(England) Mark Selby	2

Quarter-finals; Best of 9 frames
(England) Martin Gould	5
(Wales) Ryan Day	2
(England) Tom Ford	2
(England) Ali Carter	5
(England) Stuart Bingham	5
(China) Yan Bingtao	2
(England) Barry Hawkins	4
(England) Anthony Hamilton	5

Semi-finals; Best of 11 frames
(England) Martin Gould	2
(England) Ali Carter	6
(England) Stuart Bingham	4
(England) Anthony Hamilton	6

Final; Best of 17 frames
(England) Ali Carter	6
(England) Anthony Hamilton	9

== Final ==
Final: Best of 17 frames. Referee: Brendan Moore. Tempodrom, Berlin, Germany, 5 February 2017.
Ali Carter; England	6–9	Anthony Hamilton; England
Afternoon: 61–31, 69–1, 66–12, 36–72, 4–61, 116–7 (100), 69–8 (54), 28–64 (56); Evening: 15–66, 1–118 (118), 20–78 (73), 0–74 (74), 53–70 (53, 70), 83–0, 13–63 (57)
100	Highest break	118
1	Century breaks	1
3	50+ breaks	6

== Qualifying ==
These matches were played between 6 and 9 December 2016 at the Barnsley Metrodome in Barnsley, England. All matches were best of 9 frames.

Ali Carter made the 125th official maximum break in the fourth frame of his round 1 qualifying match against Wang Yuchen. It was Carter's second professional maximum break. On the same day, Ross Muir made the 126th official maximum break in the third frame of his round 1 qualifying match against Itaro Santos. It was Muir's first professional maximum break.

=== Round 1 ===
Martin Gould (ENG)	5–1	Sanderson Lam (ENG)
Jason Weston (ENG)	1–5	Craig Steadman (ENG)
Jamie Jones (WAL)	5–3	Oliver Lines (ENG)
Cao Yupeng (CHN)	4–5	James Cahill (ENG)
Kyren Wilson (ENG)	5–1	Xiao Guodong (CHN)
John Astley (ENG)	5–1	Jimmy Robertson (ENG)
Ricky Walden (ENG)	5–3	Daniel Womersley (ENG)
Andy Hicks (ENG)	2–5	Robbie Williams (ENG)
Robert Milkins (ENG)	5–3	Gareth Allen (WAL)
Ryan Day (WAL)	5–0	Rory Thor (MYS)
Adam Duffy (ENG)	5–3	Mei Xiwen (CHN)
Mark Allen (NIR)	5–4	Sean O'Sullivan (ENG)
Matthew Stevens (WAL)	5–3	Chris Wakelin (ENG)
Luca Brecel (BEL)	3–5	Robin Hull (FIN)
Zhou Yuelong (CHN)	3–5	Jimmy White (ENG)
Joe Perry (ENG)	5–3	Kurt Maflin (NOR)
Judd Trump (ENG)	5–0	Paul Davison (ENG)
Tom Ford (ENG)	5–1	Duane Jones (WAL)
Matthew Selt (ENG)	5–2	Ian Preece (WAL)
Michael Georgiou (CYP)	3–5	Peter Ebdon (ENG)
Ronnie O'Sullivan (ENG)	5–4	Darryl Hill (IOM)
Gary Wilson (ENG)	5–3	Rod Lawler (ENG)
Mark King (ENG)	5–1	Rhys Clark (SCO)
Jamie Curtis-Barrett (ENG)	0–5	Andrew Higginson (ENG)
Josh Boileau (IRL)	1–5	Noppon Saengkham (THA)
Stephen Maguire (SCO)	5–4	Mitchell Mann (ENG)
Ross Muir (SCO)	5–2	Itaro Santos (BRA)
Ali Carter (ENG)	5–0	Wang Yuchen (CHN)
Jack Lisowski (ENG)	5–1	David Grace (ENG)
Graeme Dott (SCO)	2–5	Sunny Akani (THA)
Zhao Xintong (CHN)	5–3	Li Hang (CHN)
John Higgins (SCO)	5–4	Rory McLeod (ENG)

Stuart Bingham (ENG)	5–2	Alfie Burden (ENG)
Peter Lines (ENG)	1–5	Yu Delu (CHN)
Mark Davis (ENG)	5–3	Fraser Patrick (SCO)
Zhang Yong (CHN)	5–4	Mike Dunn (ENG)
Marco Fu (HKG)	5–3	David John (WAL)
Martin O'Donnell (ENG)	4–5	Adam Stefanow (POL)
David Gilbert (ENG)	5–3	Kurt Dunham (AUS)
Elliot Slessor (ENG)	3–5	Allan Taylor (ENG)
Igor Figueiredo (BRA)	5–2	Eden Sharav (SCO)
Michael Holt (ENG)	5–0	James Wattana (THA)
Stuart Carrington (ENG)	5–2	Ken Doherty (IRL)
Liang Wenbo (CHN)	w/d–w/o	Sam Craigie (ENG)
Alex Borg (MLT)	5–3	Sydney Wilson (ENG)
Alan McManus (SCO)	4–5	Dominic Dale (WAL)
Yan Bingtao (CHN)	5–1	Sam Baird (ENG)
Shaun Murphy (ENG)	5–1	Daniel Wells (WAL)
Neil Robertson (AUS)	5–2	Lee Walker (WAL)
Christopher Keogan (ENG)	5–3	Brandon Sargeant (ENG)
Ben Woollaston (ENG)	5–1	Zak Surety (ENG)
Tian Pengfei (CHN)	5–4	Zhang Anda (CHN)
Barry Hawkins (ENG)	5–3	Ian Burns (ENG)
Jamie Cope (ENG)	1–5	Jak Jones (WAL)
Michael White (WAL)	5–4	Chen Zhe (CHN)
Hammad Miah (ENG)	1–5	Liam Highfield (ENG)
Scott Donaldson (SCO)	3–5	Boonyarit Keattikun (THA)
Anthony McGill (SCO)	2–5	Anthony Hamilton (ENG)
Kritsanut Lertsattayathorn (THA)	1–5	Mark Joyce (ENG)
Mark Williams (WAL)	5–3	Fergal O'Brien (IRL)
Aditya Mehta (IND)	5–4	Nigel Bond (ENG)
Thepchaiya Un-Nooh (THA)	5–3	Joe Swail (NIR)
Michael Wild (ENG)	4–5	Fang Xiongman (CHN)
Mark Selby (ENG)	5–0	Dechawat Poomjaeng (THA)

=== Round 2 ===
(England) Martin Gould	5–1	(England) Craig Steadman
(Wales) Jamie Jones	5–2	(England) James Cahill
(England) Kyren Wilson	4–5	(England) John Astley
(England) Ricky Walden	5–1	(England) Robbie Williams
(England) Robert Milkins	3–5	(Wales) Ryan Day
(England) Adam Duffy	2–5	(Northern Ireland) Mark Allen
(Wales) Matthew Stevens	3–5	(Finland) Robin Hull
(England) Jimmy White	5–3	(England) Joe Perry
(England) Judd Trump	1–5	(England) Tom Ford
(England) Matthew Selt	4–5	(England) Peter Ebdon
(England) Ronnie O'Sullivan	5–3	(England) Gary Wilson
(England) Mark King	5–3	(England) Andrew Higginson
(Thailand) Noppon Saengkham	4–5	(Scotland) Stephen Maguire
(Scotland) Ross Muir	4–5	(England) Ali Carter
(England) Jack Lisowski	4–5	(Thailand) Sunny Akani
(China) Zhao Xintong	5–1	(Scotland) John Higgins

(England) Stuart Bingham	5–3	(China) Yu Delu
(England) Mark Davis	3–5	(China) Zhang Yong
(Hong Kong) Marco Fu	5–1	(Poland) Adam Stefanow
(England) David Gilbert	5–2	(England) Allan Taylor
(Brazil) Igor Figueiredo	3–5	(England) Michael Holt
(England) Stuart Carrington	5–1	(England) Sam Craigie
(Malta) Alex Borg	1–5	(Wales) Dominic Dale
(China) Yan Bingtao	5–4	(England) Shaun Murphy
(Australia) Neil Robertson	5–1	(England) Christopher Keogan
(England) Ben Woollaston	5–1	(China) Tian Pengfei
(England) Barry Hawkins	5–0	(Wales) Jak Jones
(Wales) Michael White	5–4	(England) Liam Highfield
(Thailand) Boonyarit Keattikun	3–5	(England) Anthony Hamilton
(England) Mark Joyce	4–5	(Wales) Mark Williams
(India) Aditya Mehta	4–5	(Thailand) Thepchaiya Un-Nooh
(China) Fang Xiongman	0–5	(England) Mark Selby

== Century breaks ==
=== Televised stage centuries ===
Total: 16

- 147 – Tom Ford
- 137, 126 – Martin Gould
- 132, 104 – Ryan Day
- 129 – Stuart Bingham
- 125 – Robin Hull
- 118 – Anthony Hamilton
- 117, 112, 101, 100 – Ali Carter
- 117 – Ben Woollaston
- 115 – Yan Bingtao
- 103 – Zhao Xintong
- 100 – Mark Selby

=== Qualifying stage centuries ===
Total: 56

- 147, 106 – Ali Carter
- 147 – Ross Muir
- 140, 101 – Stuart Carrington
- 139, 123 – Michael Georgiou
- 138 – Zhao Xintong
- 136 – Jamie Jones
- 135, 101 – Robin Hull
- 135 – Alfie Burden
- 133, 127, 117, 106 – Shaun Murphy
- 132 – Marco Fu
- 131, 120 – Mark Selby
- 129 – Michael White
- 128 – Itaro Santos
- 128 – Matthew Selt
- 126 – Scott Donaldson
- 125, 110 – David Gilbert
- 124, 109 – Tian Pengfei
- 122, 112 – Thepchaiya Un-Nooh
- 119 – Jack Lisowski
- 118, 109, 102 – Sunny Akani
- 118 – Mei Xiwen
- 116 – Matthew Stevens
- 116 – Fergal O'Brien
- 114 – Kyren Wilson
- 113 – Xiao Guodong
- 113 – Mark King
- 112 – Luca Brecel
- 112 – Judd Trump
- 107 – Joe Perry
- 107 – Robert Milkins
- 106 – Ben Woollaston
- 105 – Mark Allen
- 105 – Ronnie O'Sullivan
- 105 – Dominic Dale
- 104 – Sean O'Sullivan
- 104 – Joe Swail
- 102 – Aditya Mehta
- 102 – Rory McLeod
- 102 – Gary Wilson
- 101 – Ricky Walden
- 101 – Liam Highfield
- 101 – John Astley
- 101 – Mark Joyce
