= John Astley (snooker player) =

English snooker player

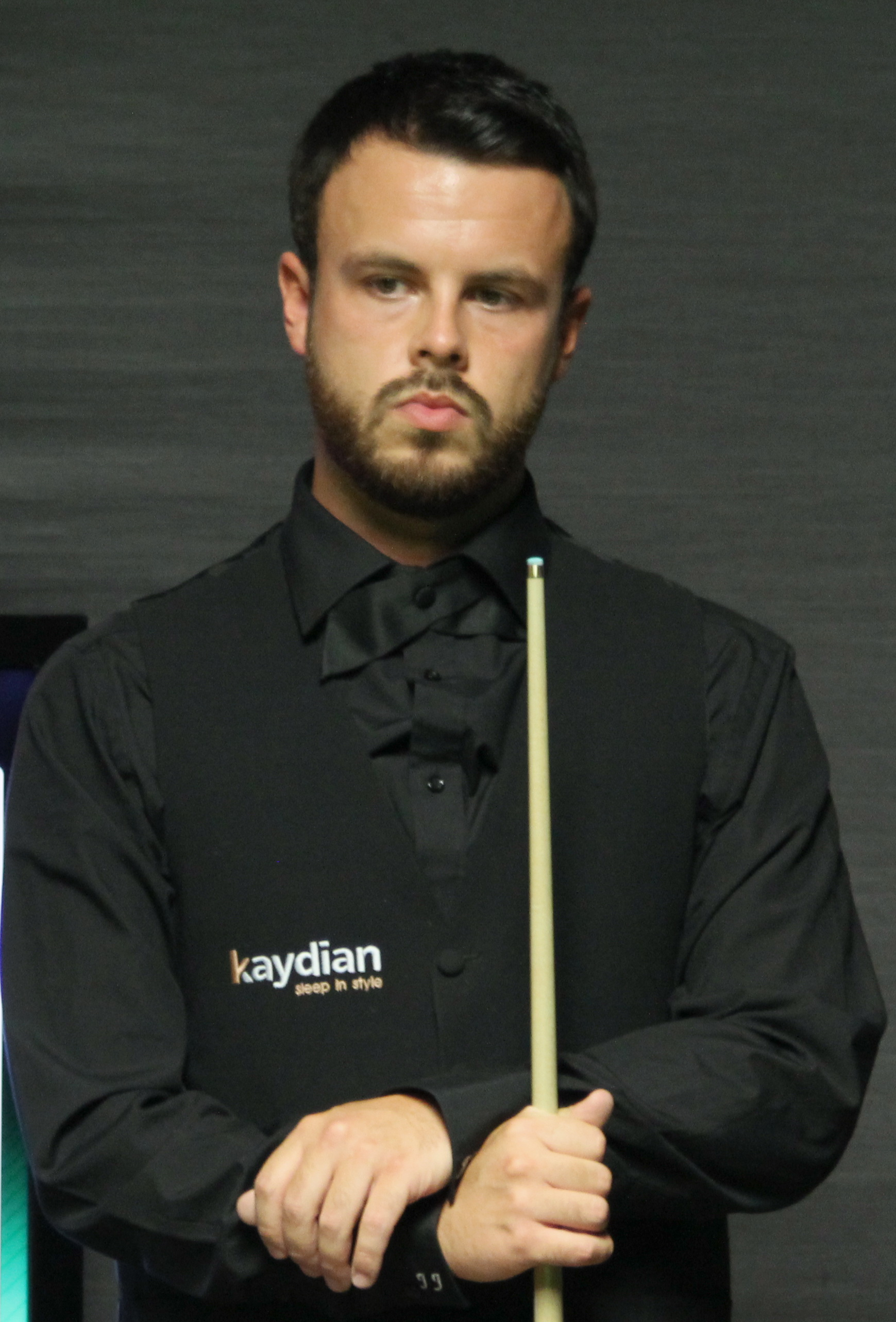
- Paul Hunter Classic 2016

Personal information
- Born: 13 January 1989 (age 37) Gateshead, England

Sport
- Country: England
- Sport: Snooker
- Professional: 2013–2015, 2016–2020, 2022–2024
- Highest ranking: 65 (November 2017)
- Best ranking finish: Quarter-final (x1)

John J. Astley (born 13 January 1989) is an English former professional snooker player from Gateshead, Tyne and Wear.

== Career ==
=== Early career ===
Astley first came into prominence in 2007 by winning the national Under-19 title (defeating Michael Georgiou in the final), however wins in the amateur PIOS tournaments proved hard to come by. His attempts to qualify for the main tour via Q School in 2011 and 2012 were unsuccessful as well. Nevertheless, Astley gained enough sponsorship to be able to enter all the PTC events in the 2012–13 season as an amateur. He reached the last 32 stage three times and finished fourth highest ranked amateur on the Order of Merit, winning a tour card for 2013–14 and 2014–15 seasons.

=== 2013/2014 ===
Astley won his opening match of the season 5–2 against Mike Dunn to reach the main draw of the Wuxi Classic. In his first appearance in a ranking event Astley was whitewashed 5–0 by Robert Milkins. He won a match in a ranking event for the first time by edging out Ken Doherty 6–5 in the UK Championship, a performance he described afterwards as the best of his career. He lost 6–1 against Stuart Carrington in the next round. Astley also qualified for the China Open with a 5–2 success over Robbie Williams and then came through a wildcard round match once in China, before losing 5–1 to Ding Junhui. Astley beat Sam Baird 10–9 in the first round of World Championship qualifying, but his season ended in his next match with a heavy 10–2 loss to Jamie Cope. He finished his debut season on the tour ranked world number 98. Astley was awarded the Rookie of the Year Award at the World Snooker Annual Award Ceremony.

=== 2014/2015 ===
Astley's 2014–15 season proved to be disappointing as he could not qualify for any ranking event, other than the UK Championship and Welsh Open for which he gained automatic entry. He lost in the first round of the UK 6–2 to Jamie Cope and beat David Gilbert 4–1 at the Welsh, before Gary Wilson knocked him out 4–3 in the second round. Astley played in all six of the minor-ranking European Tour events but could not win a match in any of them. After losing his first qualifying match for the World Championship to Dominic Dale, Astley was relegated from the tour as he was ranked 86th in the world.

=== 2016/2017 ===
Astley entered the 2016 Q School and in the second event he beat Peter Lines 4–0 to secure a two-year tour card.

At the 2016 Riga Masters, Astley beat Joe Perry 4–1, Andy Hicks 4–2 and Jimmy Robertson 4–1 to play in the quarter-finals of a ranking event for the first time in his career, where he lost 4–1 to Mark Williams. He also reached the third round of the Indian Open and Paul Hunter Classic and was defeated 4–2 by Nigel Bond and 4–1 by Zack Richardson. Astley qualified for the International Championship by overcoming Peter Ebdon 6–3 and then saw off Mark King 6–4 once in China, before losing 6–2 to Mark Selby. He recovered to win 5–4 from 4–0 down against Kyren Wilson to qualify for the German Masters, where he was edged out 5–4 by Ricky Walden in the opening round. Astley progressed through to the fourth round of the Gibraltar Open by 4–1 victories over Andreas Ploner, George Pragnall and Ben Woollaston and was eliminated 4–2 by Ryan Day. He finished his first year back on the tour ranked world number 76.

== Outside snooker ==
In March 2016, Astley appeared on-stage at the Sheffield Crucible in Richard Bean's play, The Nap, as the opponent of lead Jack O'Connell's character.

== Performance and rankings timeline ==
Tournament	2012/ 13	2013/ 14	2014/ 15	2015/ 16	2016/ 17	2017/ 18	2018/ 19	2019/ 20	2020/ 21	2021/ 22	2022/ 23	2023/ 24	2025/ 26
Ranking (Note: It shows the ranking at the beginning of the season)	(Note: He was an amateur)	(Note: New players on the Main Tour don't have a ranking)	98			66	(Note: Players qualified One Year Ranking List started the season without ranking points)	73				70	
Ranking tournaments
Championship League	Non-Ranking Event								RR	RR	RR	2R	RR
Wuhan Open	Tournament Not Held											LQ	
English Open	Tournament Not Held				2R	2R	1R	2R	A	A	3R	LQ	
British Open	Tournament Not Held									2R	WD	LQ	
Northern Ireland Open	Tournament Not Held				2R	1R	1R	1R	A	LQ	2R	LQ	
International Championship	A	LQ	LQ	A	2R	1R	1R	LQ	Not Held			1R	
UK Championship	A	2R	1R	A	1R	1R	1R	1R	A	2R	LQ	LQ	
Shoot Out	Non-Ranking Event				2R	2R	2R	1R	2R	1R	2R	1R	
Scottish Open	MR	Not Held			1R	1R	1R	2R	A	LQ	1R	LQ	
German Masters	A	LQ	LQ	A	1R	LQ	LQ	LQ	A	LQ	LQ	LQ	
World Grand Prix	Not Held		NR	DNQ	DNQ	DNQ	DNQ	DNQ	DNQ	DNQ	DNQ	DNQ	
Players Championship (Note: The event was called the Players Tour Championship Grand Final (2012/2013–2015/2016))	DNQ	DNQ	DNQ	DNQ	DNQ	DNQ	DNQ	DNQ	DNQ	DNQ	DNQ	DNQ	
Welsh Open	A	1R	2R	A	2R	4R	1R	2R	A	A	LQ	LQ	
World Open	A	LQ	Not Held		LQ	2R	LQ	LQ	Not Held			WD	
Tour Championship	Tournament Not Held						DNQ	DNQ	DNQ	DNQ	DNQ	DNQ	
World Championship	A	LQ	LQ	A	LQ	LQ	LQ	LQ	A	LQ	LQ	LQ	
Former ranking tournaments
Wuxi Classic	A	1R	LQ	Tournament Not Held									
Australian Goldfields Open	A	LQ	LQ	A	Tournament Not Held								
Shanghai Masters	A	LQ	LQ	A	LQ	1R	Non-Ranking		Not Held			Non-Ranking	
Paul Hunter Classic	Minor-Ranking Event				3R	2R	1R	NR	Tournament Not Held				
Indian Open	NH	LQ	LQ	NH	3R	1R	2R	Tournament Not Held					
China Open	A	1R	LQ	A	LQ	LQ	1R	Tournament Not Held					
Riga Masters	Not Held		Minor-Ranking		QF	2R	LQ	LQ	Tournament Not Held				
China Championship	Tournament Not Held				NR	LQ	1R	LQ	Tournament Not Held				
WST Pro Series	Tournament Not Held								RR	Tournament Not Held			
Turkish Masters	Tournament Not Held									LQ	Not Held		
Gibraltar Open	Not Held			MR	4R	2R	2R	1R	1R	2R	Not Held		
WST Classic	Not Held										1R	Not Held	
European Masters	Tournament Not Held				LQ	1R	LQ	LQ	A	LQ	LQ	LQ	NH
Former non-ranking tournaments
Six-red World Championship	A	A	A	A	A	A	A	A	Not Held		LQ	Not Held	

Performance Table Legend
LQ	lost in the qualifying draw	#R	lost in the early rounds of the tournament (WR = Wildcard round, RR = Round robin)	QF	lost in the quarter-finals
SF	lost in the semi-finals	F	lost in the final	W	won the tournament
DNQ	did not qualify for the tournament	A	did not participate in the tournament	WD	withdrew from the tournament

NH / Not Held	means an event was not held.
NR / Non-Ranking Event	means an event is/was no longer a ranking event.
R / Ranking Event	means an event is/was a ranking event.
MR / Minor-Ranking Event	means an event is/was a minor-ranking event.

== Tournament wins ==
=== Amateur ===
- English Under-19 Championship, 2007
- EBSA Qualifying Tour – Bulgaria, 2012
