= Bluebell Wood Children's Hospice =

UK charity

- Trade name: Bluebell Wood Children's Hospice
- Industry: Charity, Healthcare
- Founded: Charity founded: Rotherham, United Kingdom, 1998; Hospice opened (19 September 2008)
- Headquarters: United Kingdom
- Revenue: 5,014,722 pound sterling (2020)
- Number of employees: 168 (2020)
- Website: www.bluebellwood.org

Bluebell Wood Children's Hospice is a children's hospice run as registered charity offering palliative care and support to families who have a child or young person with a shortened life expectancy and complex medical needs. Bluebell Wood provides support to the whole family, both at their hospice in Rotherham, and in families' own homes.

Bluebell Wood is located in North Anston, Rotherham and their services cover all of South Yorkshire, north Derbyshire, north Nottinghamshire and parts of North Lincolnshire.
