= 2012–13 snooker season =

Series of snooker tournaments

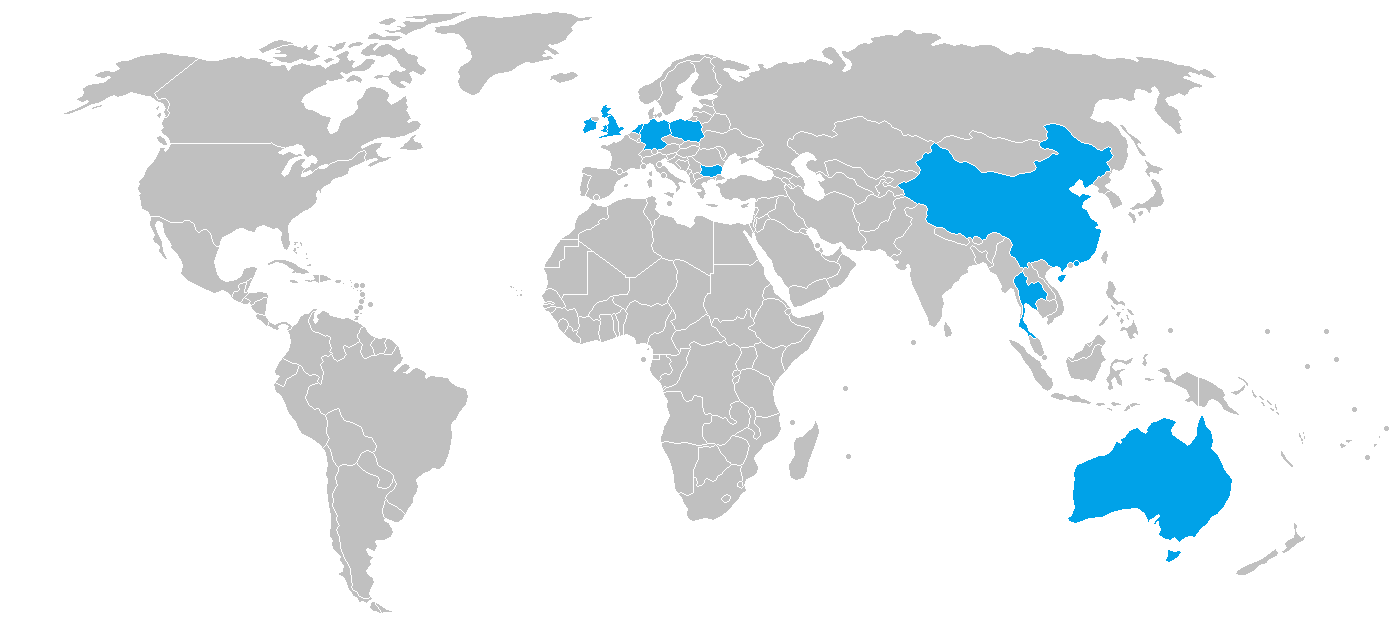
- Nations that hosted an event in the snooker calendar during the 2012–13 season

Details
- Duration: 16 May 2012 – 6 May 2013
- Tournaments: 35 (11 ranking events)

Triple Crown winners
- UK Championship: Mark Selby (ENG)
- Masters: Mark Selby (ENG)
- World Championship: Ronnie O'Sullivan (ENG)

The 2012–13 snooker season was a series of snooker tournaments played between 16 May 2012 and 6 May 2013. The season featured two new ranking events: the Wuxi Classic and the International Championship. The tour had a record five ranking events in China, and three new PTC events in Asia. The tour also visited Bulgaria for the first time in its history, and returned to Poland, Belgium and Australia. Before the start of the season World Snooker requested every player to sign a players contract, that would allow players to choose which events they want to enter – no player was forced to play in any event. At the end of the season Mark Selby was named the World Snooker Player of the Year, the Snooker Writers' Player of the Year and the Fans' Player of the Year and Ian Burns the Rookie of the Year. Ronnie O'Sullivan received the "Performance of the Year" for winning his fifth World title after playing just one competitive match during the season. Jimmy Robertson's 57 break in just 130 seconds at the Snooker Shoot Out received the "Magic Moment of the Year" award. Terry Griffiths, Joe Johnson, Peter Ebdon, Ken Doherty, Graeme Dott, Shaun Murphy and Neil Robertson were inducted into the Hall of Fame.

The season had a total of £7.1 million of prize money. The World Championship, the UK Championship, the International Championship and the Masters were the four biggest tournaments in terms of prize money with the total pot being over half a million pounds at each event. A further £5,000 was on offer at the televised stages of each ranking event for any player who compiled a maximum break and this prize rolled over from one tournament to the next if not won. A £500 rolling prize was given to any player who completed the feat in the qualifying stages of ranking events. A separate £500 rolling prize was also available in all the PTC events, but this prize was excluded from the Asian PTCs. If at any tournament a 147 was made by more than one player, then the prize was equally shared.

== New professional players ==
Countries

- Australia
- Belgium
- Canada
- China
- Egypt
- England
- India
- Iran
- Malta
- Norway
- Scotland
- Thailand
- Wales

The 2012/2013 season was made up of 99 professional players. The top 64 players after the 2012 World Championships automatically qualified for the 2012/2013 season as did the top eight who were not in the top 64 from the Players Tour Championship Order of Merit. Another twelve places were available through the 2012 Q School; the rest of the places on to the tour came from amateur events and national governing body nominations. All players except those in the top 64 received a tour card for two seasons. Listed below are the players who qualified for the 2012/2013 and 2013/2014 season.

International champions:

1. IBSF World Snooker Championship winner: Hossein Vafaei (IRI)
2. IBSF World Under-21 Snooker Championship winner: Thanawat Thirapongpaiboon (THA)
3. EBSA European Snooker Championships winner: Scott Donaldson (SCO)
4. EBSA European Under-21 Snooker Championships winner: Michael Leslie (SCO)
5. ACBS Asian Snooker Championship runner-up: (Note: The winner was Aditya Mehta, who was on the Main Tour the previous season, and therefore couldn't re-qualify via an amateur event.) Pankaj Advani (IND)
6. ACBS Asian Under-21 Snooker Championship runner-up: (Note: The winner was Hossein Vafaei, who already qualified for the Main Tour by winning IBSF World Snooker Championship.) Zhang Anda (CHN)

NGB nominations

7. Chinese nomination 1: Tian Pengfei (CHN)
8. Chinese nomination 2: Cao Yupeng (CHN)
9. Indian nomination: Aditya Mehta (IND)
10. Thai nomination: Thepchaiya Un-Nooh (THA)
11. European nomination 1: Luca Brecel (BEL)
12. European nomination 2: Tony Drago (MLT)
13. American nomination: Floyd Ziegler (CAN)
14. Oceania nomination: Ben Judge (AUS)
15. African nomination: Mohamed Khairy (EGY)

Players Tour Championship Order of Merit

16. Li Yan (CHN)
17. Passakorn Suwannawat (THA)
18. Simon Bedford (ENG)
19. Dechawat Poomjaeng (THA)
20. Craig Steadman (ENG)
21. Kurt Maflin (NOR)
22. David Grace (ENG)
23. Liam Highfield (ENG)

2012 Q School:

24. Martin O'Donnell (ENG)
25. Sam Baird (ENG)
26. Ian Burns (ENG)
27. Chen Zhe (CHN)
28. Daniel Wells (WAL)
29. Jamie O'Neill (ENG)
30. Sean O'Sullivan (ENG)
31. Paul Davison (ENG)
32. Rod Lawler (ENG)
33. Michael Wasley (ENG)
34. Joel Walker (ENG)
35. Robbie Williams (ENG)

== Calendar ==
The following table outlines the results and dates for all the ranking and major invitational events.

=== World Snooker Tour ===
Start	Finish	Tournament	Venue	Winner	Score	Runner-up	Ref.
18 Jun	22 Jun	Asian Players Tour Championship – Event 1‡	Zhangjiagang Sports Center in Zhangjiagang, China	Stuart Bingham (ENG)	4‍–‍3	Stephen Lee (ENG)	
25 Jun	1 Jul	Wuxi Classic	Wuxi City Sports Park Stadium in Wuxi, China	Ricky Walden (ENG)	10‍–‍4	Stuart Bingham (ENG)	
2 Jul	7 Jul	Six-red World Championship†	Montien Riverside Hotel in Bangkok, Thailand	Mark Davis (ENG)	8‍–‍4	Shaun Murphy (ENG)	
9 Jul	15 Jul	Australian Goldfields Open	Bendigo Stadium in Bendigo, Australia	Barry Hawkins (ENG)	9‍–‍3	Peter Ebdon (ENG)	
18 Jul	22 Jul	Players Tour Championship – Event 1‡	South West Snooker Academy in Gloucester, England	Stephen Maguire (SCO)	4‍–‍3	Jack Lisowski (ENG)	
8 Aug	12 Aug	Players Tour Championship – Event 2‡	South West Snooker Academy in Gloucester, England	Martin Gould (ENG)	4‍–‍3	Stephen Maguire (SCO)	
23 Aug	26 Aug	European Tour – Event 1 (Note: Event also known as the 2012 Paul Hunter Classic)‡	Stadthalle in Fürth, Germany	Mark Selby (ENG)	4‍–‍1	Joe Swail (NIR)	
5 Sep	9 Sep	Players Tour Championship – Event 3‡	South West Snooker Academy in Gloucester, England	Rod Lawler (ENG)	4‍–‍2	Marco Fu (HKG)	
17 Sep	23 Sep	Shanghai Masters	Shanghai Grand Stage in Shanghai, China	John Higgins (SCO)	10‍–‍9	Judd Trump (ENG)	
23 Sep	27 Sep	Asian Players Tour Championship – Event 2‡	Yixing Sports Centre in Yixing, China	Stephen Lee (ENG)	4‍–‍0	Ding Junhui (CHN)	
16 Aug	18 Aug	European Tour – Event 2 (Note: Event also known as the 2012 Gdynia Open)‡	World Snooker Academy in Sheffield, England	Neil Robertson (AUS)	4‍–‍3	Jamie Burnett (SCO)	
5 Oct	7 Oct	European Tour – Event 2‡	Gdynia Sports Arena in Gdynia, Poland	Neil Robertson (AUS)	4‍–‍3	Jamie Burnett (SCO)	
17 Oct	21 Oct	European Tour – Event 3 (Note: Event also known as the 2012 Antwerp Open and 2012 Belgian Open)‡	Lotto Arena in Antwerp, Belgium	Mark Allen (NIR)	4‍–‍1	Mark Selby (ENG)	
28 Oct	4 Nov	International Championship	Sichuan International Tennis Center in Chengdu, China	Judd Trump (ENG)	10‍–‍8	Neil Robertson (AUS)	
5 Nov	9 Nov	Asian Players Tour Championship – Event 3‡	Henan Province Sports Stadium in Zhengzhou, China	Stuart Bingham (ENG)	4‍–‍3	Li Hang (CHN)	
11 Nov	14 Nov	Players Tour Championship – Event 4 (Note: Event also known as the 2012 Kay Suzanne Memorial Trophy and the 2012 Kay Suzanne Memorial Cup)‡	South West Snooker Academy in Gloucester, England	John Higgins (SCO)	4‍–‍2	Judd Trump (ENG)	
15 Nov	18 Nov	European Tour – Event 4 (Note: Event also known as the 2012 Bulgarian Open)‡	Princess Hotel in Sofia, Bulgaria	Judd Trump (ENG)	4‍–‍0	John Higgins (SCO)	
16 Aug	25 Nov	Premier League†	Grimsby Auditorium in Grimsby, England	Stuart Bingham (ENG)	7‍–‍2	Judd Trump (ENG)	
1 Dec	9 Dec	UK Championship	Barbican Centre in York, England	Mark Selby (ENG)	10‍–‍6	Shaun Murphy (ENG)	
13 Dec	16 Dec	European Tour – Event 5 (Note: Event also known as the 2012 Scottish Open)‡	Ravenscraig Sports Facility in Ravenscraig, Scotland	Ding Junhui (CHN)	4‍–‍2	Anthony McGill (SCO)	
26 Nov	27 Nov	European Tour – Event 6 (Note: Event also known as the 2013 Munich Open and the 2013 FFB Open)‡	World Snooker Academy in Sheffield, England	Mark Selby (ENG)	4‍–‍3	Graeme Dott (SCO)	
4 Jan	6 Jan	European Tour – Event 6‡	Event Forum in Fürstenfeldbruck, Germany	Mark Selby (ENG)	4‍–‍3	Graeme Dott (SCO)	
13 Jan	20 Jan	Masters†	Alexandra Palace in London, England	Mark Selby (ENG)	10‍–‍6	Neil Robertson (AUS)	
25 Jan	27 Jan	Snooker Shoot Out†	Circus Arena in Blackpool, England	Martin Gould (ENG)	1‍–‍0	Mark Allen (NIR)	
30 Jan	3 Feb	German Masters	Tempodrom in Berlin, Germany	Ali Carter (ENG)	9‍–‍6	Marco Fu (HKG)	
11 Feb	17 Feb	Welsh Open	Newport Centre in Newport, Wales	Stephen Maguire (SCO)	9‍–‍8	Stuart Bingham (ENG)	
25 Feb	3 Mar	World Open	Hainan International Exhibition Center in Haikou, China	Mark Allen (NIR)	10‍–‍4	Matthew Stevens (WAL)	
12 Mar	17 Mar	Players Tour Championship Finals	Bailey Allen Hall in Galway, Ireland	Ding Junhui (CHN)	4‍–‍3	Neil Robertson (AUS)	
7 Jan	21 Mar	Championship League†	Crondon Park Golf Club in Stock, England	Martin Gould (ENG)	3‍–‍2	Ali Carter (ENG)	
25 Mar	31 Mar	China Open	Beijing University Students' Gymnasium in Beijing, China	Neil Robertson (AUS)	10‍–‍6	Mark Selby (ENG)	
20 Apr	6 May	World Snooker Championship	Crucible Theatre in Sheffield, England	Ronnie O'Sullivan (ENG)	18‍–‍12	Barry Hawkins (ENG)	

Ranking event
‡ Minor-ranking event
† Non-ranking event

=== World Ladies Billiards and Snooker Association ===
Start	Finish	Tournament	Venue	Winner	Score	Runner-up	Ref.
26 May		Agnes Davies Memorial	Terry Griffiths Matchroom in Llanelli, Wales	Jaique Ip (HKG)	3‍–‍0	So Man Yan (HKG)	
29 Sep		Northern Championship	North East Derbyshire Snooker Centre in Chesterfield, England	Ng On Yee (HKG)	3‍–‍0	Maria Catalano (ENG)	
3 Nov		UK Ladies Championship	Jesters Snooker in Swindon, England	Maria Catalano (ENG)	3‍–‍0	Tina Owen-Sevilton (ENG)	
2 Mar		Connie Gough Memorial	Woking Snooker Centre in Woking, England	Maria Catalano (ENG)	3‍–‍0	Emma Bonney (ENG)	
14 Apr	15 Apr	World Ladies Championship	Cambridge Snooker Centre in Cambridge, England	Reanne Evans (ENG)	6‍–‍3	Maria Catalano (ENG)	

=== Seniors events ===
Start	Finish	Tournament	Venue	Winner	Score	Runner-up	Ref.
27 Oct	28 Oct	World Seniors Championship	Mountbatten Centre in Portsmouth, England	Nigel Bond (ENG)	2‍–‍0	Tony Chappel (WAL)	

=== Other events ===
Start	Finish	Tournament	Venue	Winner	Score	Runner-up	Ref.
16 May	20 May	Austrian Open	BRP-Hall in Wels, Austria	Mark Williams (WAL)	6‍–‍5	Matthew Couch (ENG)	
7 Jun	10 Jun	Pink Ribbon	South West Snooker Academy in Gloucester, England	Stuart Bingham (ENG)	4‍–‍0	Peter Lines (ENG)	
12 Jul	15 Jul	Vienna Snooker Open	Theater Dschungel in Vienna, Austria	Simon Bedford (ENG)	5‍–‍2	Jamie Jones (WAL)	
11 Sep	14 Sep	General Cup	General Snooker Club in Hong Kong, China	Neil Robertson (AUS)	7‍–‍6	Ricky Walden (ENG)	
11 Jan	13 Jan	Dutch Open	De Dieze in 's-Hertogenbosch, Netherlands	Luca Brecel (BEL)	5‍–‍3	Bjorn Haneveer (BEL)	

== Official rankings ==
=== Seeding revision 1 ===
No.	Ch.	Name	Points
1	Steady	Mark Selby (ENG)	74925
2	▲	Judd Trump (ENG)	68975
3	▼	Mark Williams (WAL)	63560
4	▲	Stephen Maguire (SCO)	61400
5	▲	John Higgins (SCO)	61320
6	▼	Shaun Murphy (ENG)	59685
7	▼	Neil Robertson (AUS)	59540
8	▲	Stephen Lee (ENG)	56550
9	▲	Ronnie O'Sullivan (ENG)	53060
10	▲	Matthew Stevens (WAL)	52760
11	▼	Ding Junhui (CHN)	52340
12	▼	Mark Allen (NIR)	50065
13	▼	Graeme Dott (SCO)	49445
14	▼	Martin Gould (ENG)	47290
15	▲	Ricky Walden (ENG)	46945
16	Steady	Stuart Bingham (ENG)	46600

=== Seeding revision 2 ===
No.	Ch.	Name	Points
1	Steady	Mark Selby (ENG)	77485
2	Steady	Judd Trump (ENG)	72075
3	Steady	Mark Williams (WAL)	67740
4	Steady	Stephen Maguire (SCO)	63980
5	▲	Shaun Murphy (ENG)	63925
6	▲	Neil Robertson (AUS)	62980
7	▼	John Higgins (SCO)	61680
8	Steady	Stephen Lee (ENG)	60670
9	▲	Ding Junhui (CHN)	56220
10	▲	Ricky Walden (ENG)	54245
11	▼	Matthew Stevens (WAL)	53900
12	▲	Stuart Bingham (ENG)	53700
13	▼	Mark Allen (NIR)	53485
14	▼	Graeme Dott (SCO)	52225
15	▼	Ronnie O'Sullivan (ENG)	52060
16	▼	Martin Gould (ENG)	51650

=== Seeding revision 3 ===
No.	Ch.	Name	Points
1	▲	Judd Trump (ENG)	79155
2	▼	Mark Selby (ENG)	76620
3	▲	John Higgins (SCO)	72040
4	▲	Shaun Murphy (ENG)	67140
5	▲	Neil Robertson (AUS)	65180
6	▼	Mark Williams (WAL)	64400
7	▼	Stephen Maguire (SCO)	63080
8	▲	Mark Allen (NIR)	59800
9	▼	Stephen Lee (ENG)	59670
10	▲	Stuart Bingham (ENG)	54575
11	▼	Ding Junhui (CHN)	54280
12	▼	Ricky Walden (ENG)	54125
13	▲	Graeme Dott (SCO)	52740
14	▼	Matthew Stevens (WAL)	50140
15	▲	Ali Carter (ENG)	47000
16	▲	Barry Hawkins (ENG)	46915

=== Seeding revision 4 ===
No.	Ch.	Name	Points
1	▲	Mark Selby (ENG)	81380
2	▼	Judd Trump (ENG)	79275
3	Steady	John Higgins (SCO)	70680
4	Steady	Shaun Murphy (ENG)	68220
5	Steady	Neil Robertson (AUS)	65540
6	▲	Stephen Maguire (SCO)	60320
7	▼	Mark Williams (WAL)	60320
8	Steady	Mark Allen (NIR)	56360
9	Steady	Stephen Lee (ENG)	55430
10	Steady	Stuart Bingham (ENG)	55255
11	Steady	Ding Junhui (CHN)	53840
12	Steady	Ricky Walden (ENG)	53165
13	▲	Matthew Stevens (WAL)	52660
14	▼	Graeme Dott (SCO)	52500
15	Steady	Ali Carter (ENG)	51760
16	▲	Mark Davis (ENG)	50190

=== Seeding revision 5 ===
No.	Ch.	Name	Points
1	Steady	Mark Selby (ENG)	80940
2	▲	Neil Robertson (AUS)	79460
3	▼	Judd Trump (ENG)	78320
4	Steady	Shaun Murphy (ENG)	67020
5	▲	Stephen Maguire (SCO)	66940
6	▲	Mark Allen (NIR)	66060
7	▼	John Higgins (SCO)	64955
8	▲	Stuart Bingham (ENG)	61740
9	▲	Ding Junhui (CHN)	59300
10	▼	Mark Williams (WAL)	58260
11	▲	Graeme Dott (SCO)	56100
12	▲	Matthew Stevens (WAL)	55060
13	▼	Ricky Walden (ENG)	54765
14	▲	Barry Hawkins (ENG)	54680
15	Steady	Ali Carter (ENG)	52895
16	Steady	Mark Davis (ENG)	51630

== World ranking points ==
No.	Ch (Note: "Ch" = Change since the beginning of the season 2012/2013. See for the player rankings at the start of the season.)	Player	Season (Note: The 2010/2011 points only included the ranking points that counted towards the next seedings update. See for the points accumulated during the 2010/2011 season and see for points accumulated during the 2011/2012 season. Players ranked outside of the top 64 at the beginning of the 2012/2013 season had any points accumulated from the previous seasons wiped, and started again on 0 points. Players on 0 points were ranked alphabetically.)		Tournament (Note: See for the points accumulated during the 2012/2013 season up to the first cut-off point; see for the points accumulated between the first and second cut-off points; see for the points accumulated between the second and third; see for the points accumulated between the third and fourth cut-off points; see for the points accumulated at the World Championship.)											Season	Cut-off point (Note: See for the rankings at the first seedings cut-off point; see for the rankings at the second cut-off point; see for the rankings at the third cut-off point; see for the rankings at the fourth cut-off point; see for the rankings at the end of the season.)				Total
No.	Ch	Player	10/11	11/12	PTC	WUC	AO	SM	IC	UK	GM	WEO	WOO	CO	WC	12/13	1	2	3	4	Total
1	Steady	(England) Mark Selby	0	36480	10240	3500	700	980	3040	8000	2500	1400	3500	5600	3800	43260	77485	76620	81380	80940	79740
2	▲5	(Australia) Neil Robertson	0	37020	8520	980	1900	2660	6400	4000	3200	1900	4480	7000	1400	42440	62980	65180	65540	79460	79460
3	▼1	(England) Judd Trump	0	35620	8240	2660		5600	8000	1120	1400	3200	3500	980	6400	41100	72075	79155	79275	78320	76720
4	▲2	(England) Shaun Murphy	0	27900	4800	980	2500	4480	5120	6400	2500	1400	2660	4480	5000	40320	63925	67140	68220	67020	68220
5	▼1	(Scotland) Stephen Maguire	0	34520	7760	980		2660	3040	3040	1400	5000	2660	4480	1400	32420	63980	63080	60320	66940	66940
6	▲10	(England) Stuart Bingham	0	22340	9120	5600	700	3500	1120	4000	1400	4000	2660	3500	5000	40600	53700	54575	55255	61740	62940
7	▲5	(Northern Ireland) Mark Allen	0	30340	6820	2660		2660	4000	1120	1900	1900	7000	2660	1400	32120	53485	59800	56360	66060	62460
8	▲7	(England) Ricky Walden	0	23725	5200	7000	700	2660	4000	1120	1400	1400	3500	2660	6400	36040	54245	54125	53165	54765	59765
9	▲13	(England) Barry Hawkins	0	19860	8220	1960	5000	1960	920	3040	3200	1400	2660	2660	8000	39020	47700	46915	47915	54680	58880
10	▲1	(China) Ding Junhui	0	23580	11720	980	1900	980	3040	1120	1900	3200	3500	980	5000	34320	56220	54280	53840	59300	57900
11	▼6	(Scotland) John Higgins	0	29320	7040			7000	1120	3040	575	1400	4480	980	1400	27035	61680	72040	70680	64955	56355
12	▲1	(Scotland) Graeme Dott	0	25380	5440	3500		3500	1120	3040	1900	1900	2660	2660	3800	29520	52225	52740	52500	56100	54900
13	▲6	(England) Mark Davis	0	21130	6760	4480	3200	1960	3040	5120	575	575	980	2660	3800	33150	48210	46670	50190	51630	54280
14	▼4	(Wales) Matthew Stevens	0	27080	4280	0	1900	980	3040	4000	2500	1900	5600	980	1400	26580	53900	50140	52660	55060	53660
15	▼12	(Wales) Mark Williams	0	26680	7680	3500		4480	1120	1120	1400	1400	980	3500	1400	26580	67740	64400	60320	58260	53260
16	▲1	(England) Ali Carter	0	21700	6620	980	700	3500	2240	5120	5000	575	0	2660	3800	31195	48900	47000	51760	52895	52895

Player did not enter tournament.

== Points distribution ==
2012/2013 points distribution for world ranking and minor-ranking events

Tournament	Round →	R96	R80	R64	R48	R32	R16	QF	SF	F	W
Wuxi Classic	Unseeded loser	560	910	1260	1610	1960	2660	3500	4480	5600	7000
Wuxi Classic	Seeded loser	280	455	630	805	980	–	–	–	–	–
Australian Goldfields Open	Unseeded loser	400	650	900	1150	1400	1900	2500	3200	4000	5000
Australian Goldfields Open	Seeded loser	200	325	450	575	700	–	–	–	–	–
Shanghai Masters	Unseeded loser	560	910	1260	1610	1960	2660	3500	4480	5600	7000
Shanghai Masters	Seeded loser	280	455	630	805	980	–	–	–	–	–
International Championship	Unseeded loser	640	1040	1440	1840	2240	3040	4000	5120	6400	8000
International Championship	Seeded loser	320	520	720	920	1120	–	–	–	–	–
UK Championship	Unseeded loser	640	1040	1440	1840	2240	3040	4000	5120	6400	8000
UK Championship	Seeded loser	320	520	720	920	1120	–	–	–	–	–
German Masters	Unseeded loser	900	–	1150	–	1400	1900	2500	3200	4000	5000
German Masters	Seeded loser	450	–	575	–	–	–	–	–	–	–
Welsh Open	Unseeded loser	900	–	1150	–	1400	1900	2500	3200	4000	5000
Welsh Open	Seeded loser	450	–	575	–	–	–	–	–	–	–
World Open	Unseeded loser	560	910	1260	1610	1960	2660	3500	4480	5600	7000
World Open	Seeded loser	280	455	630	805	980	–	–	–	–	–
Players Tour Championship	Regular events	–	–	360	–	560	760	1000	1280	1600	2000
Players Tour Championship	Finals	–	–	–	–	840	1140	1500	1920	2400	3000
China Open	Unseeded loser	560	910	1260	1610	1960	2660	3500	4480	5600	7000
China Open	Seeded loser	280	455	630	805	980	–	–	–	–	–
World Championship	Unseeded loser	800	1300	1800	2300	2800	3800	5000	6400	8000	10000
World Championship	Seeded loser	400	650	900	1150	1400	–	–	–	–	–
