= Players Tour Championship 2011/2012 – Event 7 =

Players Tour Championship 2011/2012 Event 7
Tournament information
- Dates: 5–9 October 2011
- Venue: South West Snooker Academy
- City: Gloucester
- Country: England
- Organisation: World Snooker
- Format: Minor-ranking event
- Total prize fund: £50,000
- Winner's share: £10,000
- Highest break: David Gilbert (ENG) (141)

Final
- Champion: Ronnie O'Sullivan (ENG)
- Runner-up: Matthew Stevens (WAL)
- Score: 4–2

The Players Tour Championship 2011/2012 – Event 7 (also known as the 2011 Kay Suzanne Memorial Trophy) was a professional minor-ranking snooker tournament that took place between 5–9 October 2011 at the South West Snooker Academy in Gloucester, England.

Ronnie O'Sullivan won the 47th professional title of his career by defeating Matthew Stevens 4–2 in the final. O'Sullivan also became the first player to win two PTC titles in the same season.

== Prize fund and ranking points ==
The breakdown of prize money and ranking points of the event is shown below:

| | Prize fund | Ranking points^{1} |
|---|---|---|
| Winner | £10,000 | 2,000 |
| Runner-up | £5,000 | 1,600 |
| Semi-finalist | £2,500 | 1,280 |
| Quarter-finalist | £1,500 | 1,000 |
| Last 16 | £1,000 | 760 |
| Last 32 | £600 | 560 |
| Last 64 | £200 | 360 |
| Total | £50,000 | – |

- ^{1} Only professional players can earn ranking points.

== Main draw ==
=== Preliminary rounds ===
==== Round 1 ====
Best of 7 frames

| (England) Jordan Winbourne | 4–3 | (England) Jamie Curtis-Barrett |
| (England) Geoff Williams | 4–0 | (Pakistan) Hasan Khan |
| (England) Shaun Wilkes | 1–4 | (England) Chris Norbury |
| (England) David Bailey | 3–4 | (England) Liam Monk |
| (Republic of Ireland) Douglas Hogan | w/d–w/o | (England) Sydney Wilson |
| (England) Les Dodd | 3–4 | (Republic of Ireland) John Sutton |
| (Wales) Callum Lloyd | 0–4 | (Northern Ireland) Patrick Wallace |
| (Scotland) Michael Leslie | 2–4 | (England) Reanne Evans |
| (England) Robert Tickner | 0–4 | (Wales) Duane Jones |
| (England) John Whitty | 2–4 | (Wales) Jamie Clarke |
| (England) Ashley Wright | 4–3 | (England) Steve Ventham |
| (England) Shane Castle | 0–4 | (England) Mitchell Mann |
| (England) Jamie Walker | 2–4 | (Wales) Alex Taubman |
| (England) Lewis Mayes | w/d–w/o | (England) Danny Brindle |
| (England) Ricky Norris | 2–4 | (England) Oliver Brown |
| (England) Martin O'Donnell | 4–2 | (England) Ross Summers |
| (England) Jonathan Birch | w/d–w/o | (England) Michael Wasley |
| (England) Jim Buck | 3–4 | (England) Adam Bobat |
| (England) David Gray | 4–2 | (England) Del Smith |
| (England) Ryan Causton | 4–1 | (England) Lee Page |
| (Republic of Ireland) Joe Delaney | 4–0 | (England) Christopher Keogan |
| (England) Marc Harman | 1–4 | (England) Zak Surety |
| (England) Jamie O' Neill | 4–1 | (England) Joel Walker |
| (England) Kyren Wilson | 4–2 | (China) Chen Zhe |
| (England) Ian Glover | 4–1 | (England) Bash Maqsood |
| (England) James Hill | 3–4 | (England) James Cahill |
| (Poland) Marek Slomianowski | 0–4 | (Wales) Gareth Allen |

| (England) Ian Stark | 1–4 | (England) Martin Ball |
| (England) Mike Finn | 4–3 | (England) Phil O'Kane |
| (England) George Marter | 0–4 | (England) Nick Jennings |
| (England) Darren Bond | 4–2 | (England) George Pragnall |
| (England) Ben Harrison | 4–3 | (England) Stephen Craigie |
| (England) Greg Batten | w/o–w/d | (Wales) Richard King |
| (England) Tony Knowles | 1–4 | (England) James McGouran |
| (Scotland) Marc Davis | w/o–w/d | (England) David Birley |
| (England) Michael Wild | 4–0 | (Pakistan) Najmur Khan |
| (Scotland) Jonathan Fulcher | 1–4 | (England) Billy Joe Castle |
| (England) Tom Maxfield | w/o–w/d | (Wales) Ross Jones |
| (England) Thomas Emes | 1–4 | (China) Zhang Anda |
| (England) Andrew Milliard | 2–4 | (England) Sean O'Sullivan |
| (England) Justin Astley | 4–0 | (England) John Woods |
| (England) Allan Taylor | 4–3 | (Wales) Kishan Hirani |
| (Thailand) Thanawat Thirapongpaiboon | 4–2 | (England) Terry Challenger |
| (Wales) Dale Pope | 0–4 | (England) Matthew Day |
| (Singapore) Marvin Lim | 4–0 | (England) Kashif Khan |
| (England) Ian Burns | 4–0 | (England) Mitchell Travis |
| (England) Sam Harvey | 4–0 | (Belgium) Hans Blanckaert |
| (Canada) Brent Kolbeck | w/d–w/o | (England) James Welsh |
| (Republic of Ireland) Michael Judge | w/d–w/o | (England) Gary Weeks |
| (England) Brian Morgan | 4–1 | (England) Rees Carter |
| (England) Jake Nicholson | 4–1 | (England) Lee Farebrother |
| (England) Adam Nash | 2–4 | (Singapore) Tommy Ang |
| (England) James Brown | 4–1 | (England) Nikolas Charalambous |

==== Round 2 ====
Best of 7 frames

| (England) Saqib Nasir | 2–4 | (England) Jordan Winbourne |
| (England) Geoff Williams | 1–4 | (England) Chris Norbury |
| (England) Ali Bassiri | 0–4 | (England) Liam Monk |
| (England) Sydney Wilson | 0–4 | (Republic of Ireland) John Sutton |
| (Northern Ireland) Patrick Wallace | 4–2 | (England) Reanne Evans |
| (England) Robbie Williams | 1–4 | (Wales) Duane Jones |
| (Wales) Jamie Clarke | 2–4 | (England) Ashley Wright |
| (India) David Singh | 1–4 | (England) Mitchell Mann |
| (Wales) Alex Taubman | 4–2 | (England) Danny Brindle |
| (England) Oliver Brown | 0–4 | (England) Martin O'Donnell |
| (England) Alex Davies | 2–4 | (England) Michael Wasley |
| (England) Adam Bobat | 2–4 | (England) David Gray |
| (England) Gary Wilson | 4–3 | (England) Ryan Causton |
| (Republic of Ireland) Joe Delaney | 4–0 | (England) Zak Surety |
| (England) Jamie O' Neill | 3–4 | (England) Kyren Wilson |
| (England) Sachin Plaha | 0–4 | (England) Ian Glover |

| (Australia) Ryan Thomerson | 4–1 | (England) James Cahill |
| (Wales) Gareth Allen | 4–0 | (England) Martin Ball |
| (England) Mike Finn | 0–4 | (England) Nick Jennings |
| (England) Darren Bond | 3–4 | (England) Ben Harrison |
| (Wales) Jak Jones | 4–1 | (England) Greg Batten |
| (England) James McGouran | 4–1 | (Scotland) Marc Davis |
| (England) Michael Wild | 0–4 | (England) Billy Joe Castle |
| (England) Tom Maxfield | 2–4 | (China) Zhang Anda |
| (England) Sean O'Sullivan | 1–4 | (England) Justin Astley |
| (England) Allan Taylor | 4–3 | (Thailand) Thanawat Thirapongpaiboon |
| (England) Matthew Day | 4–3 | (Singapore) Marvin Lim |
| (England) Oliver Lines | 2–4 | (England) Ian Burns |
| (England) Sam Harvey | 4–1 | (England) James Welsh |
| (England) Gary Weeks | 1–4 | (England) Brian Morgan |
| (Scotland) Eden Sharav | 4–1 | (England) Jake Nicholson |
| (Singapore) Tommy Ang | 3–4 | (England) James Brown |

=== Main rounds ===
==== Top half ====
===== Section 1 =====
Last 128; Best of 7 frames
(England) Ronnie O'Sullivan | 4
(England) Jordan Winbourne | 0
(China) Xiao Guodong | 3
(India) Aditya Mehta | 4
(England) Craig Steadman | 4
(England) Chris Norbury | 0
(England) Martin Gould | 4
(England) Rod Lawler | 3
(Scotland) Stephen Maguire | 4
(England) Liam Monk | 1
(England) Barry Hawkins | 4
(England) Stuart Carrington | 1
(Republic of Ireland) David Morris | 4
(China) Liu Song | 2
(Scotland) John Higgins | 4
(Republic of Ireland) John Sutton | 2

Last 64; Best of 7 frames
(England) Ronnie O'Sullivan | 4
(India) Aditya Mehta | 0
(England) Craig Steadman | 1
(England) Martin Gould | 4
(Scotland) Stephen Maguire | 4
(England) Barry Hawkins | 2
(Republic of Ireland) David Morris | 4
(Scotland) John Higgins | 2

Last 32; Best of 7 frames
(England) Ronnie O'Sullivan | 4
(England) Martin Gould | 1
(Scotland) Stephen Maguire | 4
(Republic of Ireland) David Morris | 1

Last 16; Best of 7 frames
(England) Ronnie O'Sullivan | 4
(Scotland) Stephen Maguire | 2

===== Section 2 =====
Last 128; Best of 7 frames
(England) Mark King | 4
(England) Ian McCulloch | 2
(Scotland) Anthony McGill | 1
(Northern Ireland) Patrick Wallace | 4
(Scotland) Jamie Burnett | 3
(Wales) Duane Jones | 4
(Wales) Ryan Day | 4
(Wales) Daniel Wells | 3
(Scotland) Marcus Campbell | 3
(China) Liu Chuang | 4
(England) Stuart Bingham | 4
(England) Barry Pinches | 0
(Thailand) Dechawat Poomjaeng | 4
(England) Ashley Wright | 3
(England) Rory McLeod | 4
(England) Mitchell Mann | 0

Last 64; Best of 7 frames
(England) Mark King | 4
(Northern Ireland) Patrick Wallace | 3
(Wales) Duane Jones | 3
(Wales) Ryan Day | 4
(China) Liu Chuang | 4
(England) Stuart Bingham | 3
(Thailand) Dechawat Poomjaeng | 1
(England) Rory McLeod | 4

Last 32; Best of 7 frames
(England) Mark King | 4
(Wales) Ryan Day | 0
(China) Liu Chuang | 4
(England) Rory McLeod | 0

Last 16; Best of 7 frames
(England) Mark King | 3
(China) Liu Chuang | 4

===== Section 3 =====
Last 128; Best of 7 frames
(Wales) Dominic Dale | 4
(Poland) Kacper Filipiak | 0
(Australia) Neil Robertson | 1
(England) Anthony Hamilton | 4
(England) Andrew Higginson | 4
(Hong Kong) Marco Fu | 1
(Malta) Tony Drago | 4
(Scotland) Scott MacKenzie | 2
(Wales) Andrew Pagett | 4
(Wales) Alex Taubman | 1
(Wales) Michael White | 4
(England) Martin O'Donnell | 2
(England) Robert Milkins | 4
(England) Michael Wasley | 3
(Thailand) Passakorn Suwannawat | 1
(Northern Ireland) Gerard Greene | 4

Last 64; Best of 7 frames
(Wales) Dominic Dale | 0
(England) Anthony Hamilton | 4
(England) Andrew Higginson | 4
(Malta) Tony Drago | 1
(Wales) Andrew Pagett | 2
(Wales) Michael White | 4
(England) Robert Milkins | 1
(Northern Ireland) Gerard Greene | 4

Last 32; Best of 7 frames
(England) Anthony Hamilton | 2
(England) Andrew Higginson | 4
(Wales) Michael White | 4
(Northern Ireland) Gerard Greene | 0

Last 16; Best of 7 frames
(England) Andrew Higginson | 3
(Wales) Michael White | 4

===== Section 4 =====
Last 128; Best of 7 frames
(Scotland) Stephen Hendry | 4
(England) David Gray | 2
(England) Stephen Lee | 4
(England) Gary Wilson | 2
(England) Jamie Cope | 3
(Republic of Ireland) Joe Delaney | 4
(England) Joe Perry | 4
(England) Adam Wicheard | 1
(England) Matthew Selt | 1
(England) Jack Lisowski | 4
(England) Michael Holt | 4
(Wales) Mark Williams | 2
(England) Ben Woollaston | 1
(England) Kyren Wilson | 4
(England) Joe Jogia | 2
(China) Tian Pengfei | 4

Last 64; Best of 7 frames
(Scotland) Stephen Hendry | 4
(England) Stephen Lee | 0
(Republic of Ireland) Joe Delaney | 1
(England) Joe Perry | 4
(England) Jack Lisowski | 2
(England) Michael Holt | 4
(England) Kyren Wilson | 4
(China) Tian Pengfei | 0

Last 32; Best of 7 frames
(Scotland) Stephen Hendry | 3
(England) Joe Perry | 4
(England) Michael Holt | 1
(England) Kyren Wilson | 4

Last 16; Best of 7 frames
(England) Joe Perry | 0
(England) Kyren Wilson | 4

==== Bottom half ====
===== Section 5 =====
Last 128; Best of 7 frames
(England) Judd Trump | 4
(England) Ian Glover | 2
(England) David Gilbert | 4
(Australia) Ryan Thomerson | 1
(England) Adam Duffy | 4
(Wales) Gareth Allen | 1
(England) Ali Carter | 4
(England) Andrew Norman | 0
(China) Yu Delu | 4
(England) Nick Jennings | 1
(Belgium) Luca Brecel | 2
(England) Ben Harrison | 4
(England) Mark Joyce | 4
(Northern Ireland) Joe Swail | 3
(Wales) Matthew Stevens | 4
(China) Cao Yupeng | 2

Last 64; Best of 7 frames
(England) Judd Trump | 4
(England) David Gilbert | 2
(England) Adam Duffy | 2
(England) Ali Carter | 4
(China) Yu Delu | 2
(England) Ben Harrison | 4
(England) Mark Joyce | 2
(Wales) Matthew Stevens | 4

Last 32; Best of 7 frames
(England) Judd Trump | 3
(England) Ali Carter | 4
(England) Ben Harrison | 2
(Wales) Matthew Stevens | 4

Last 16; Best of 7 frames
(England) Ali Carter | 3
(Wales) Matthew Stevens | 4

===== Section 6 =====
Last 128; Best of 7 frames
(England) Peter Lines | 3
(Wales) Jak Jones | 4
(England) Tom Ford | w/o
(Finland) Robin Hull | w/d
(Republic of Ireland) Fergal O'Brien | 0
(China) Liang Wenbo | 4
(England) Sam Baird | 1
(England) James McGouran | 4
(England) Sam Craigie | 4
(England) Matthew Couch | 1
(England) Nigel Bond | 4
(England) Billy Joe Castle | 0
(Norway) Kurt Maflin | 2
(England) Shaun Murphy | 4
(Thailand) James Wattana | 2
(England) Alfie Burden | 4

Last 64; Best of 7 frames
(Wales) Jak Jones | 4
(England) Tom Ford | 2
(China) Liang Wenbo | 4
(England) James McGouran | 2
(England) Sam Craigie | 1
(England) Nigel Bond | 4
(England) Shaun Murphy | 4
(England) Alfie Burden | 0

Last 32; Best of 7 frames
(Wales) Jak Jones | 1
(China) Liang Wenbo | 4
(England) Nigel Bond | 1
(England) Shaun Murphy | 4

Last 16; Best of 7 frames
(China) Liang Wenbo | 2
(England) Shaun Murphy | 4

===== Section 7 =====
Last 128; Best of 7 frames
(Northern Ireland) Mark Allen | 4
(China) Zhang Anda | 3
(Scotland) Graeme Dott | 4
(England) Justin Astley | 1
(England) Steve Davis | 4
(England) David Grace | 2
(Scotland) Alan McManus | 1
(England) Peter Ebdon | 4
(Republic of Ireland) Ken Doherty | 2
(England) Allan Taylor | 4
(England) Mark Davis | 4
(England) Matthew Day | 1
(Wales) Jamie Jones | 4
(England) Ian Burns | 1
(England) Ricky Walden | 4
(India) Lucky Vatnani | 1

Last 64; Best of 7 frames
(Northern Ireland) Mark Allen | 3
(Scotland) Graeme Dott | 4
(England) Steve Davis | 4
(England) Peter Ebdon | 2
(England) Allan Taylor | 0
(England) Mark Davis | 4
(Wales) Jamie Jones | 4
(England) Ricky Walden | 1

Last 32; Best of 7 frames
(Scotland) Graeme Dott | 4
(England) Steve Davis | 3
(England) Mark Davis | 3
(Wales) Jamie Jones | 4

Last 16; Best of 7 frames
(Scotland) Graeme Dott | 0
(Wales) Jamie Jones | 4

===== Section 8 =====
Last 128; Best of 7 frames
(England) Dave Harold | 4
(England) Sam Harvey | 2
(England) Liam Highfield | 4
(Republic of Ireland) David Hogan | 3
(China) Li Yan | 4
(England) Brian Morgan | 1
(England) Mike Dunn | 1
(England) Adrian Gunnell | 4
(England) Jimmy Robertson | 4
(England) Paul Davison | 1
(England) Jimmy White | 4
(Scotland) Eden Sharav | 0
(England) Andy Hicks | 4
(Northern Ireland) Joe Meara | 1
(England) Mark Selby | 4
(England) James Brown | 0

Last 64; Best of 7 frames
(England) Dave Harold | 4
(England) Liam Highfield | 3
(China) Li Yan | 4
(England) Adrian Gunnell | 0
(England) Jimmy Robertson | 4
(England) Jimmy White | 2
(England) Andy Hicks | 4
(England) Mark Selby | 0

Last 32; Best of 7 frames
(England) Dave Harold | 1
(China) Li Yan | 4
(England) Jimmy Robertson | 4
(England) Andy Hicks | 2

Last 16; Best of 7 frames
(China) Li Yan | 3
(England) Jimmy Robertson | 4

==== Finals ====
| Quarter-finals; Best of 7 frames | | Semi-finals; Best of 7 frames | | Final; Best of 7 frames |
| (England) Ronnie O'Sullivan | 4 |
| (China) Liu Chuang | 1 | (England) Ronnie O'Sullivan | 4 |
| (Wales) Michael White | 4 | (Wales) Michael White | 2 |
| (England) Kyren Wilson | 1 | | | (England) Ronnie O'Sullivan | 4 |
| (Wales) Matthew Stevens | 4 | | | (Wales) Matthew Stevens | 2 |
| (England) Shaun Murphy | 2 | (Wales) Matthew Stevens | 4 |
| (Wales) Jamie Jones | 2 | (England) Jimmy Robertson | 0 |
| (England) Jimmy Robertson | 4 |

== Century breaks ==
Only from last 128 onwards.

- 141 – David Gilbert
- 140, 126, 103, 101, 101 – Michael White
- 137 – Stuart Bingham
- 137 – Yu Delu
- 137 – Nigel Bond
- 136, 115, 107, 104, 103 – Ronnie O'Sullivan
- 133 – Aditya Mehta
- 130, 100 – Martin Gould
- 130 – John Higgins
- 130, 124 – Liang Wenbo
- 127, 127, 119 – Matthew Stevens
- 127, 125 – Li Yan
- 124 – Judd Trump
- 123, 112 – Stephen Hendry
- 120 – Lucky Vatnani
- 117 – Mark King
- 115, 113 – Mark Allen
- 115 – Mark Selby
- 114 – Mike Dunn
- 113, 112, 105 – Shaun Murphy
- 112, 105 – Michael Holt
- 109 – Andrew Higginson
- 108 – Dominic Dale
- 104 – David Morris
- 103 – Barry Hawkins
- 103 – Ben Harrison
- 102, 101, 101 – Liu Chuang
- 100 – Gerard Greene
- 100 – Andy Hicks
