= Players Tour Championship 2012/2013 – Event 4 =

Players Tour Championship 2012/2013 Event 4
Tournament information
- Dates: 11–14 November 2012
- Venue: South West Snooker Academy
- City: Gloucester
- Country: England
- Organisation: World Snooker
- Format: Minor-ranking event
- Total prize fund: £50,000
- Winner's share: £10,000
- Highest break: Kurt Maflin (NOR) (145)

Final
- Champion: John Higgins (SCO)
- Runner-up: Judd Trump (ENG)
- Score: 4–2

The Players Tour Championship 2012/2013 – Event 4 (also known as the 2012 Kay Suzanne Memorial Trophy and the 2012 Kay Suzanne Memorial Cup) was a professional minor-ranking snooker tournament that took place between 11 and 14 November 2012 at the South West Snooker Academy in Gloucester, England. On 12 August 2012 it was announced, that this will be the last professional event held at the venue.

Ronnie O'Sullivan was the defending champion, but he withdrew from the competition on 6 November 2012.

John Higgins won his 40th professional title by defeating Judd Trump 4–2 in the final.

== Prize fund and ranking points ==
The breakdown of prize money and ranking points of the event is shown below:

	Prize fund	Ranking points^{1}
Winner	£10,000	2,000
Runner-up	£5,000	1,600
Semi-finalist	£2,500	1,280
Quarter-finalist	£1,500	1,000
Last 16	£1,000	760
Last 32	£600	560
Last 64	£200	360
Total	£50,000	–

- ^{1} Only professional players can earn ranking points.

== Main draw ==
=== Preliminary rounds ===
==== Round 1 ====
Best of 7 frames

(Scotland) Rhys Clark	2–4	(England) Adam Edge
(England) Oliver Lines	3–4	(England) Shane Castle
(Scotland) Fraser Patrick	4–0	(China) Feng Yijun
(England) Michael Wild	4–0	(Scotland) Ross Higgins
(England) George Marter	4–3	(England) Liam Monk
(England) Zak Surety	4–3	(India) Manish Jain
(Wales) Gareth Allen	4–2	(England) Joe Steele
(Wales) Jak Jones	4–0	(England) Mitchell Mann
(England) Nico Elton	1–4	(England) Justin Astley
(England) Lee Page	2–4	(England) James Cahill
(England) Hassan Miah	1–4	(England) John Whitty
(Wales) Ben Jones	4–2	(England) Christopher Keogan

(England) Joe O'Connor	4–0	(England) Richard Remelie
(England) Henry Roper	4–0	(England) Eric Pei
(England) Ian Glover	4–1	(England) Adam Bobat
(England) Stuart Carrington	4–0	(England) Robert Tickner
(India) Kamal Chawla	4–1	(Wales) Jack Bradford
(England) Andrew Greaves	4–1	(England) Gareth Green
(England) Reanne Evans	1–4	(England) Matthew Day
(England) Greg Davis	w/d–w/o	(England) Darren Bond
(Wales) Duane Jones	4–2	(England) Brandon Sargeant
(England) Ben Fortey	0–4	(Scotland) Dylan Craig
(England) Sam Craigie	1–4	(England) Kyren Wilson

==== Round 2 ====
Best of 7 frames

(England) Scott Bell	1–4	(England) Adam Edge
(Wales) Jamie Clarke	1–4	(England) Shane Castle
(Wales) Gavin Lewis	3–4	(Scotland) Fraser Patrick
(England) Darrell Whitworth	1–4	(England) Michael Wild
(England) Peter Devlin	0–4	(England) George Marter
(England) Ryan Causton	4–3	(Scotland) Marc Davis
(England) Ashley Carty	2–4	(England) Oliver Brown
(Northern Ireland) Billy Brown	0–4	(England) Zak Surety
(England) Craig Barber	3–4	(Wales) Gareth Allen
(England) Geoff Williams	1–4	(Wales) Jak Jones
(England) Ricky Norris	1–4	(England) Justin Astley
(England) Sanderson Lam	0–4	(England) James Cahill
(England) Anthony Harris	2–4	(England) John Whitty
(England) Adam Wicheard	4–0	(England) Benjamin Finch
(England) Louis Heathcote	2–4	(Wales) Ben Jones

(England) Andy Marriott	w/d–w/o	(England) Joe O'Connor
(England) Dylan Mitchell	4–2	(Scotland) Sean James Riach
(Portugal) Francisco Domingues	4–3	(England) Henry Roper
(England) Jamie Curtis-Barrett	1–4	(England) Ian Glover
(England) James Cullen	0–4	(England) Stuart Carrington
(England) Andrew Milliard	2–4	(India) Kamal Chawla
(England) James Gillespie	4–1	(England) Toby Simpson
(Wales) Kishan Hirani	4–0	(England) Andrew Greaves
(England) Franky McGovern	0–4	(England) Matthew Day
(Brazil) Itaro Santos	1–4	(England) Darren Bond
(England) Jeff Cundy	1–4	(Wales) Duane Jones
(England) Elliot Slessor	4–3	(Scotland) Dylan Craig
(England) Steve Ventham	w/d–w/o	(England) Callum Downing
(England) Sam Harvey	3–4	(England) Kyren Wilson

=== Main rounds ===
==== Top half ====
===== Section 1 =====
Last 128; Best of 7 frames
(England) Mark Selby	4
(Scotland) Anthony McGill	1
(England) Alfie Burden	4
(England) Adam Edge	0
(England) Chris Norbury	2
(China) Chen Zhe	4
(England) Dave Harold	4
(England) Shane Castle	2
(England) Andrew Norman	1
(Malta) Tony Drago	4
(England) David Grace	4
(England) David Gilbert	3
(England) Jack Lisowski	4
(Scotland) Fraser Patrick	1
(China) Liang Wenbo	2
(England) Liam Highfield	4

Last 64; Best of 7 frames
(England) Mark Selby	4
(England) Alfie Burden	0
(China) Chen Zhe	4
(England) Dave Harold	3
(Malta) Tony Drago	4
(England) David Grace	2
(England) Jack Lisowski	4
(England) Liam Highfield	2

Last 32; Best of 7 frames
(England) Mark Selby	4
(China) Chen Zhe	0
(Malta) Tony Drago	4
(England) Jack Lisowski	1

Last 16; Best of 7 frames
(England) Mark Selby	4
(Malta) Tony Drago	3

===== Section 2 =====
Last 128; Best of 7 frames
(England) Rory McLeod	4
(England) Michael Wild	1
(England) Andrew Higginson	4
(England) George Marter	0
(Hong Kong) Marco Fu	3
(England) Ryan Causton	4
(England) Anthony Hamilton	4
(England) Oliver Brown	3
(India) Pankaj Advani	2
(China) Liu Chuang	4
(Wales) Ryan Day	0
(England) Michael Wasley	4
(Scotland) Jamie Burnett	1
(England) Peter Ebdon	4
(Norway) Kurt Maflin	4
(Wales) Daniel Wells	2

Last 64; Best of 7 frames
(England) Rory McLeod	2
(England) Andrew Higginson	4
(England) Ryan Causton	0
(England) Anthony Hamilton	4
(China) Liu Chuang	1
(England) Michael Wasley	4
(England) Peter Ebdon	3
(Norway) Kurt Maflin	4

Last 32; Best of 7 frames
(England) Andrew Higginson	3
(England) Anthony Hamilton	4
(England) Michael Wasley	4
(Norway) Kurt Maflin	3

Last 16; Best of 7 frames
(England) Anthony Hamilton	4
(England) Michael Wasley	1

===== Section 3 =====
Last 128; Best of 7 frames
(England) Allan Taylor	4
(England) Zak Surety	0
(England) Jamie Cope	4
(Wales) Gareth Allen	2
(China) Xiao Guodong	4
(Wales) Jak Jones	1
(England) Ian Burns	4
(England) Adam Duffy	2
(England) Barry Hawkins	4
(England) Andy Hicks	2
(England) Mark King	4
(India) Aditya Mehta	0
(Belgium) Luca Brecel	3
(England) Jimmy Robertson	4
(England) Joe Perry	4
(England) Justin Astley	2

Last 64; Best of 7 frames
(England) Allan Taylor	4
(England) Jamie Cope	1
(China) Xiao Guodong	3
(England) Ian Burns	4
(England) Barry Hawkins	4
(England) Mark King	1
(England) Jimmy Robertson	4
(England) Joe Perry	3

Last 32; Best of 7 frames
(England) Allan Taylor	3
(England) Ian Burns	4
(England) Barry Hawkins	4
(England) Jimmy Robertson	0

Last 16; Best of 7 frames
(England) Ian Burns	3
(England) Barry Hawkins	4

===== Section 4 =====
Last 128; Best of 7 frames
(England) Robert Milkins	4
(England) Mike Dunn	3
(England) Ben Woollaston	4
(England) James Cahill	0
(Scotland) John Higgins	4
(England) Jamie O'Neill	1
(England) Rod Lawler	4
(China) Li Yan	0
(England) Steve Davis	4
(England) John Whitty	3
(Thailand) James Wattana	4
(Scotland) Marcus Campbell	2
(England) Martin Gould	4
(England) Sam Baird	1
(Northern Ireland) Joe Swail	0
(Wales) Matthew Stevens	4

Last 64; Best of 7 frames
(England) Robert Milkins	0
(England) Ben Woollaston	4
(Scotland) John Higgins	4
(England) Rod Lawler	2
(England) Steve Davis	4
(Thailand) James Wattana	2
(England) Martin Gould	2
(Wales) Matthew Stevens	4

Last 32; Best of 7 frames
(England) Ben Woollaston	3
(Scotland) John Higgins	4
(England) Steve Davis	4
(Wales) Matthew Stevens	1

Last 16; Best of 7 frames
(Scotland) John Higgins	4
(England) Steve Davis	3

==== Bottom half ====
===== Section 5 =====
Last 128; Best of 7 frames
(Northern Ireland) Mark Allen	4
(England) Adam Wicheard	2
(England) Paul Davison	4
(Scotland) Scott Donaldson	3
(Wales) Dominic Dale	4
(England) Joel Walker	1
(England) Mark Joyce	4
(Wales) Ben Jones	0
(England) Ricky Walden	4
(England) Joe O'Connor	3
(Thailand) Dechawat Poomjaeng	4
(England) Dylan Mitchell	2
(England) Stuart Bingham	1
(Northern Ireland) Gerard Greene	4
(Republic of Ireland) Fergal O'Brien	w/o
(England) Ronnie O'Sullivan	w/d

Last 64; Best of 7 frames
(Northern Ireland) Mark Allen	4
(England) Paul Davison	1
(Wales) Dominic Dale	2
(England) Mark Joyce	4
(England) Ricky Walden	2
(Thailand) Dechawat Poomjaeng	4
(Northern Ireland) Gerard Greene	4
(Republic of Ireland) Fergal O'Brien	3

Last 32; Best of 7 frames
(Northern Ireland) Mark Allen	3
(England) Mark Joyce	4
(Thailand) Dechawat Poomjaeng	4
(Northern Ireland) Gerard Greene	2

Last 16; Best of 7 frames
(England) Mark Joyce	4
(Thailand) Dechawat Poomjaeng	2

===== Section 6 =====
Last 128; Best of 7 frames
(England) Michael Holt	4
(Portugal) Francisco Domingues	0
(China) Yu Delu	4
(Scotland) Michael Leslie	1
(China) Tian Pengfei	4
(England) Barry Pinches	3
(Scotland) Alan McManus	3
(Thailand) Thanawat Thirapongpaiboon	4
(England) Jimmy White	4
(England) Ian Glover	1
(Thailand) Thepchaiya Un-Nooh	4
(England) Sean O'Sullivan	2
(England) Judd Trump	4
(England) Martin O'Donnell	3
(England) Simon Bedford	4
(England) Nigel Bond	3

Last 64; Best of 7 frames
(England) Michael Holt	4
(China) Yu Delu	2
(China) Tian Pengfei	2
(Thailand) Thanawat Thirapongpaiboon	4
(England) Jimmy White	4
(Thailand) Thepchaiya Un-Nooh	2
(England) Judd Trump	4
(England) Simon Bedford	2

Last 32; Best of 7 frames
(England) Michael Holt	2
(Thailand) Thanawat Thirapongpaiboon	4
(England) Jimmy White	0
(England) Judd Trump	4

Last 16; Best of 7 frames
(Thailand) Thanawat Thirapongpaiboon	3
(England) Judd Trump	4

===== Section 7 =====
Last 128; Best of 7 frames
(Republic of Ireland) Ken Doherty	4
(England) Stuart Carrington	1
(Scotland) Graeme Dott	4
(England) Matthew Selt	0
(England) Craig Steadman	4
(India) Kamal Chawla	2
(England) Ali Carter	4
(England) James Gillespie	2
(England) Shaun Murphy	4
(Wales) Kishan Hirani	2
(England) Gary Wilson	4
(Thailand) Passakorn Suwannawat	0
(Wales) Mark Williams	4
(China) Zhang Anda	3
(England) Mark Davis	4
(England) Matthew Day	0

Last 64; Best of 7 frames
(Republic of Ireland) Ken Doherty	3
(Scotland) Graeme Dott	4
(England) Craig Steadman	3
(England) Ali Carter	4
(England) Shaun Murphy	4
(England) Gary Wilson	0
(Wales) Mark Williams	4
(England) Mark Davis	2

Last 32; Best of 7 frames
(Scotland) Graeme Dott	4
(England) Ali Carter	3
(England) Shaun Murphy	3
(Wales) Mark Williams	4

Last 16; Best of 7 frames
(Scotland) Graeme Dott	1
(Wales) Mark Williams	4

===== Section 8 =====
Last 128; Best of 7 frames
(England) Stephen Lee	w/d
(England) Peter Lines	w/o
(Wales) Michael White	4
(England) Darren Bond	0
(England) Robbie Williams	4
(Wales) Duane Jones	0
(China) Ding Junhui	4
(England) Elliot Slessor	3
(Wales) Jamie Jones	4
(England) Callum Downing	3
(England) Tom Ford	2
(England) Kyren Wilson	4
(England) John Astley	4
(Australia) Ben Judge	3
(Scotland) Stephen Maguire	4
(China) Cao Yupeng	3

Last 64; Best of 7 frames
(England) Peter Lines	3
(Wales) Michael White	4
(England) Robbie Williams	1
(China) Ding Junhui	4
(Wales) Jamie Jones	1
(England) Kyren Wilson	4
(England) John Astley	0
(Scotland) Stephen Maguire	4

Last 32; Best of 7 frames
(Wales) Michael White	2
(China) Ding Junhui	4
(England) Kyren Wilson	4
(Scotland) Stephen Maguire	2

Last 16; Best of 7 frames
(China) Ding Junhui	4
(England) Kyren Wilson	0

==== Finals ====
Quarter-finals; Best of 7 frames
1	(England) Mark Selby	3
8	(England) Anthony Hamilton	4
4	(England) Barry Hawkins	3
5	(Scotland) John Higgins	4
2	(England) Mark Joyce	2
7	(England) Judd Trump	4
3	(Wales) Mark Williams	2
6	(China) Ding Junhui	4

Semi-finals; Best of 7 frames
(England) Anthony Hamilton	3
(Scotland) John Higgins	4
(England) Judd Trump	4
(China) Ding Junhui	1

Final; Best of 7 frames
(Scotland) John Higgins	4
(England) Judd Trump	2

== Century breaks ==
- 145, 106, 104 – Kurt Maflin
- 143, 132, 123, 107, 106, 105, 105, 103, 102, 100 – Judd Trump
- 139 – Dave Harold
- 138, 138, 105 – Ali Carter
- 134 – Graeme Dott
- 132 – Michael Holt
- 129 – Jimmy Robertson
- 129 – Mark Davis
- 128, 121 – Ding Junhui
- 124 – Andrew Higginson
- 124 – Nigel Bond
- 123, 108, 101, 100 – Gerard Greene
- 121 – David Gilbert
- 119, 106 – Barry Hawkins
- 118, 102 – John Higgins
- 117 – Gareth Allen
- 116 – Mark Selby
- 113, 107, 105 – Dominic Dale
- 113 – Liu Chuang
- 112, 105 – Anthony Hamilton
- 112, 102, 101 – Mark Allen
- 112, 100 – Michael White
- 110 – Alfie Burden
- 110 – Michael Wild
- 109, 105 – Thanawat Thirapongpaiboon
- 107 – Rod Lawler
- 107 – Joe Perry
- 105 – Chris Norbury
- 104 – Ben Woollaston
- 103 – Mark Joyce
- 102 – Ben Jones
- 101 – Adam Duffy
- 101 – Craig Steadman
- 101 – Jamie Jones
- 100 – Tony Drago
- 100 – Matthew Stevens
