= Players Tour Championship 2012/2013 =

Series of snooker tournaments

The Players Tour Championship 2012/2013 was a series of snooker tournaments which started on 18 June 2012 and ended on 17 March 2013, with events held in England, across Europe and in China. In this season the European events formed the European Tour and events were held in China for the first time under the Asian Players Tour Championship name. The thirteen regular minor-ranking events were concluded with the Finals. The European Tour was sponsored by Betfair.

== Schedule ==
Date (Note: Dates use the month day format)			Tournament Name	Venue	City	Winner	Runner–up	Score	References
06–18	06–22	CHN	Asian Players Tour Championship – Event 1	Zhangjiagang Sports Center	Zhangjiagang	(England) Stuart Bingham	(England) Stephen Lee	4–3	
07–18	07–22	ENG	Players Tour Championship – Event 1	South West Snooker Academy	Gloucester	(Scotland) Stephen Maguire	(England) Jack Lisowski	4–3	
08–08	08–12	ENG	Players Tour Championship – Event 2	South West Snooker Academy	Gloucester	(England) Martin Gould	(Scotland) Stephen Maguire	4–3	
08–23	08–26	GER	European Tour – Event 1 (Note: Event also known as the 2012 Paul Hunter Classic.)	Stadthalle	Fürth	(England) Mark Selby	(Northern Ireland) Joe Swail	4–1	
09–05	09–09	ENG	Players Tour Championship – Event 3	South West Snooker Academy	Gloucester	(England) Rod Lawler	(Hong Kong) Marco Fu	4–2	
09–23	09–27	CHN	Asian Players Tour Championship – Event 2	Yixing Sports Centre	Yixing	(England) Stephen Lee	(China) Ding Junhui	4–0	
08–16	08–18	ENG	European Tour – Event 2 (Note: Event also known as the 2012 Gdynia Open.)	World Snooker Academy	Sheffield	(Australia) Neil Robertson	(Scotland) Jamie Burnett	4–3	
10–05	10–07	POL	European Tour – Event 2	Gdynia Sports Arena	Gdynia	(Australia) Neil Robertson	(Scotland) Jamie Burnett	4–3	
10–17	10–21	BEL	European Tour – Event 3 (Note: Event also known as the 2012 Antwerp Open and 2012 Belgian Open.)	Lotto Arena	Antwerp	(Northern Ireland) Mark Allen	(England) Mark Selby	4–1	
11–05	11–09	CHN	Asian Players Tour Championship – Event 3	Henan Province Sports Stadium	Zhengzhou	(England) Stuart Bingham	(China) Li Hang	4–3	
11–11	11–14	ENG	Players Tour Championship – Event 4 (Note: Event also known as the 2012 Kay Suzanne Memorial Trophy and the 2012 Kay Suzanne Memorial Cup.)	South West Snooker Academy	Gloucester	(Scotland) John Higgins	(England) Judd Trump	4–2	
11–15	11–18	BUL	European Tour – Event 4 (Note: Event also known as the 2012 Bulgarian Open.)	Princess Hotel	Sofia	(England) Judd Trump	(Scotland) John Higgins	4–0	
12–13	12–16	SCO	European Tour – Event 5 (Note: Event also known as the 2012 Scottish Open.)	Ravenscraig Sports Facility	Ravenscraig	(China) Ding Junhui	(Scotland) Anthony McGill	4–2	
11–26	11–27	ENG	European Tour – Event 6 (Note: Event also known as the 2013 Munich Open and the 2013 FFB Open.)	World Snooker Academy	Sheffield	(England) Mark Selby	(Scotland) Graeme Dott	4–3	
01–04	01–06	GER	European Tour – Event 6	Event Forum	Fürstenfeldbruck	(England) Mark Selby	(Scotland) Graeme Dott	4–3	
03–12	03–17	IRL	Players Tour Championship – Finals (Note: Event also known as the 2013 Players Tour Championship Grand Finals.)	Bailey Allen Hall	Galway	(China) Ding Junhui	(Australia) Neil Robertson	4–3	

== Order of Merit ==
=== UK/Europe ===
Player already qualified for the Finals through the Asian Order of Merit

After 10 out of 10 events:

Rank	Player	Total Points	Events Played		
Rank	Player	Total Points	UK	Europe	Total
1	(England) Mark Selby	34,900	4	5	9
2	(England) Judd Trump	22,250	4	4	8
3	(Scotland) Stephen Maguire	20,100	4	3	7
4	(Scotland) John Higgins	19,150	3	5	8
5	(Australia) Neil Robertson	19,050	2	5	7
6	(China) Ding Junhui	18,100	2	4	6
7	(England) Rod Lawler	16,400	4	6	10
8	(Northern Ireland) Mark Allen	16,050	3	5	8
9	(England) Martin Gould	15,950	4	6	10
10	(England) Ben Woollaston	11,300	4	6	10
11	(Scotland) Graeme Dott	10,500	4	5	9
12	(Scotland) Jamie Burnett	9,950	4	4	8
13	(England) Jack Lisowski	9,850	4	6	10
14	(England) Andrew Higginson	9,850	4	6	10
15	(England) Barry Hawkins	9,550	4	6	10
16	(Republic of Ireland) Ken Doherty	9,400	3	6	9
17	(Scotland) Anthony McGill	9,400	4	6	10
18	(Northern Ireland) Joe Swail	8,600	4	6	10
19	(England) Ali Carter	8,550	4	4	8
20	(England) Joe Perry	8,300	4	6	10
21	(Hong Kong) Marco Fu	8,100	4	4	8
22	(Wales) Mark Williams	8,100	4	4	8
23	(Norway) Kurt Maflin	7,550	3	6	9
24	(England) Mark Davis	7,550	4	6	10
25	(England) Alfie Burden	7,550	4	6	10
26	(England) Mark Joyce	7,400	4	6	10

(Top 26 players out of 442)

=== Asian ===
Already qualified for the Finals by winning an APTC event.

After 3 out of 3 events:

Rank	Player	Total Points	Events Played
1	(England) Stuart Bingham	20,600	3
2	(England) Stephen Lee (Note: Stephen Lee has qualified by winning an APTC event, however, due to his suspension he was replaced by Xiao Guodong.)	15,000	2
3	(China) Ding Junhui	7,100	3
4	(China) Li Hang	5,400	3
5	(England) Robert Milkins	5,000	3
6	(England) Tom Ford	4,500	3
7	(China) Cao Yupeng	4,200	3
8	(China) Xiao Guodong	3,700	3

(Top 8 players out of 113)

== Finals ==
The Finals of the Players Tour Championship 2012/2013 took place between 12–17 March 2013 at the Bailey Allen Hall in Galway, Ireland. It was contested by the top 25 players on the Order of Merit, who have played in at least 5 events (2 in the UK and 3 in Europe); the three APTC winners and the top four from the Asian Order of Merit, who didn't win an APTC tournament. If a player qualified from both Order of Merits, than the highest position counted and the next player on the other list qualified. If a player finished on both lists on the same place, than the PTC Order of Merit takes precedence and the next player from the APTC Order of Merit qualified. If an APTC event winner, who qualified through the APTC Tour and finished in the top 25 on the PTC Order of Merit, then the next highest player on the PTC Order of Merit qualified. The seeding list of the Finals was based on the combined list from the earnings of both Order of Merits.

Final: Best of 7 frames. Referee: Michaela Tabb. Bailey Allen Hall, Galway, Ireland, 17 March 2013.
Neil Robertson (7); Australia	3–4	Ding Junhui (3); China
88–45 (88), 80–0 (58), 72–55 (60, 51), 0–122 (52, 70), 0–130 (130), 44–70, 7–98 (98)
88	Highest break	130
0	Century breaks	1
3	50+ breaks	5
