= European Tour 2013/2014 – Event 6 =

European Tour 2013/2014 Event 6
Tournament information
- Dates: 7–10 November 2013
- Venue: The Capital Venue
- City: Gloucester
- Country: England
- Organisation: World Snooker
- Format: Minor-ranking event
- Total prize fund: £100,400
- Winner's share: £20,000
- Highest break: Ken Doherty (IRL) (140)

Final
- Champion: Mark Allen (NIR)
- Runner-up: Judd Trump (ENG)
- Score: 4–1

The European Tour 2013/2014 – Event 6 (also known as the 2013 Kay Suzanne Memorial Cup) was a professional minor-ranking snooker tournament that took place between 7–10 November 2013 at The Capital Venue in Gloucester, England.

John Higgins was the defending champion, but he lost 0–4 against Andrew Higginson in the last 128.

Mark Allen won his sixth professional title by defeating Judd Trump 4–1 in the final. Allen became the first player to win two consecutive Players Tour Championship events in the same season.

== Prize fund and ranking points ==
The breakdown of prize money and ranking points of the event is shown below:

	Prize fund	Ranking points^{1}
Winner	£20,000	2,000
Runner-up	£10,000	1,600
Semi-finalist	£5,000	1,280
Quarter-finalist	£2,500	1,000
Last 16	£1,700	760
Last 32	£1,100	560
Last 64	£600	360
Total	£100,400	–

- ^{1} Only professional players can earn ranking points.

== Main draw ==
=== Preliminary rounds ===
==== Round 1 ====
Best of 7 frames

(Poland) Adam Stefanow	4–2	(England) Ian Barry Stark
(England) Mike Hallett	4–0	(England) Robert Tickner
(England) Adam Wicheard	4–1	(Austria) Andreas Ploner
(England) Martin Ball	4–3	(England) Charlie Walters
(England) Vic Makh	n/s–w/o	(England) Jordan Winbourne
(England) Callum Downing	4–1	(Northern Ireland) Billy Brown
(Wales) Callum Lloyd	2–4	(Wales) Alex Taubman
(England) Henry Roper	4–2	(Pakistan) Omer Butt
(England) Sydney Wilson	4–2	(England) Anthony Harris
(England) Mitchell Mann	n/s–w/o	(England) Ian Glover
(Wales) Edward Topham	1–4	(England) Oliver Brown
(Scotland) George Cunningham	4–1	(England) Joshua Cooper
(England) Adam Bobat	3–4	(England) Sean Hopkin
(Belgium) Hans Blanckaert	1–4	(England) Phil O'Kane
(England) Ryan Causton	0–4	(Wales) Andrew Rogers
(England) Matthew Day	4–0	(Wales) Ben Jones
(Wales) Jack Bradford	4–2	(England) Michael Tomlinson
(England) Nico Elton	4–2	(England) Stefan Mazrocis
(England) Ricky Norris	3–4	(Wales) Jimmy Carney
(England) Stuart Langford	0–4	(Wales) Gareth Allen
(England) Michael Wild	4–1	(England) James Silverwood
(England) Andy Marriott	1–4	(England) Michael Georgiou
(England) Joe Steele	2–4	(England) Jeff Cundy
(Belgium) Jurian Heusdens	0–4	(England) Joe Roberts
(England) Jamie Curtis-Barrett	4–0	(England) Aaron Cook
(England) Brandon Sargeant	3–4	(England) Terry Challenger
(England) Andrew Milliard	1–4	(Scotland) Marc Davis
(Scotland) Mark Owens	4–0	(England) Ali Bassiri

(England) Ben Fortey	0–4	(Wales) Duane Jones
(England) Kurtis Weaver	1–4	(Scotland) Rhys Clark
(England) Shane Castle	2–4	(Republic of Ireland) Leo Fernandez
(England) Adam King	0–4	(England) Ashley Beal
(England) Sam Harvey	4–0	(Scotland) Barry Campbell
(England) Zak Surety	4–0	(Belgium) Jeff Jacobs
(England) Michael Williams	4–1	(England) Jaspal Bamotra
(England) Adam Longley	1–4	(England) Ben Harrison
(Belgium) Tomasz Skalski	4–3	(England) Richard Haney
(England) Wayne Townsend	4–2	(England) Steven Hallworth
(Scotland) Dylan Craig	4–0	(England) Gary Steele
(Australia) Jamie Brown	1–4	(Wales) Jamie Clarke
(Wales) Anthony Davies	4–3	(England) Andrew Greaves
(England) Oliver Lines	4–2	(England) Troy Brett
(England) Williams Lemons	3–4	(England) Mitchell Travis
(Scotland) Michael Collumb	1–4	(England) Christopher Keogan
(England) Zack Richardson	4–1	(Scotland) Ross Higgins
(England) Ashley Carty	4–2	(England) Damian Wilks
(England) Saqib Nasir	4–0	(England) Matthew Glasby
(Russia) David Maslov	4–3	(Hong Kong) Jamie Chui
(Australia) Ryan Thomerson	4–3	(England) Peter Devlin
(England) Jason Riding	1–4	(England) Reanne Evans
(England) Ashley Hugill	0–4	(England) Mark White
(England) Luke Garland	4–3	(England) Adam Edge
(England) David Rowlands	1–4	(England) Thomas Wealthy
(England) Jake Nicholson	4–1	(England) Danny Brindle
(England) Sanderson Lam	4–0	(Wales) Tyler Rees

==== Round 2 ====
Best of 7 frames

(Poland) Adam Stefanow	4–3	(England) Mike Hallett
(England) Kobi Mates	0–4	(England) Adam Wicheard
(England) Martin Ball	4–2	(England) Jordan Winbourne
(England) Callum Downing	3–4	(Wales) Alex Taubman
(England) Henry Roper	0–4	(England) Sydney Wilson
(England) Ian Glover	4–3	(England) Oliver Brown
(Wales) Kishan Hirani	4–0	(Scotland) George Cunningham
(England) Sean Hopkin	1–4	(England) Phil O'Kane
(Wales) Andrew Rogers	4–1	(England) Matthew Day
(Wales) Jack Bradford	1–4	(England) Nico Elton
(Wales) Jimmy Carney	3–4	(Wales) Gareth Allen
(England) Michael Wild	4–2	(England) Michael Georgiou
(England) Jeff Cundy	4–1	(England) Joe Roberts
(England) Carl Gibson	0–4	(England) Jamie Curtis-Barrett
(England) Terry Challenger	2–4	(Scotland) Marc Davis

(Scotland) Mark Owens	2–4	(Wales) Duane Jones
(England) Thomas Goldstein	0–4	(Scotland) Rhys Clark
(Republic of Ireland) Leo Fernandez	4–0	(England) Ashley Beal
(England) Sam Harvey	1–4	(England) Zak Surety
(Wales) Thomas Davie	0–4	(England) Michael Williams
(England) Ben Harrison	2–4	(Belgium) Tomasz Skalski
(England) Wayne Townsend	2–4	(Scotland) Dylan Craig
(Wales) Jamie Clarke	3–4	(Wales) Anthony Davies
(England) Oliver Lines	1–4	(England) Mitchell Travis
(England) Christopher Keogan	1–4	(England) Zack Richardson
(England) Ashley Carty	4–2	(England) Saqib Nasir
(Russia) David Maslov	4–2	(Australia) Ryan Thomerson
(England) Reanne Evans	0–4	(England) Mark White
(England) Luke Garland	4–2	(England) Thomas Wealthy
(England) Jake Nicholson	4–1	(England) Sanderson Lam

==== Round 3 ====
Best of 7 frames

(Poland) Adam Stefanow	1–4	(England) Adam Wicheard
(England) Martin Ball	0–4	(Wales) Alex Taubman
(England) Sydney Wilson	4–3	(England) Ian Glover
(Wales) Kishan Hirani	4–3	(England) Phil O'Kane
(Wales) Andrew Rogers	4–3	(England) Nico Elton
(Wales) Gareth Allen	0–4	(England) Michael Wild
(England) Jeff Cundy	4–2	(England) Jamie Curtis-Barrett
(Scotland) Marc Davis	0–4	(Wales) Duane Jones

(Scotland) Rhys Clark	2–4	(Republic of Ireland) Leo Fernandez
(England) Zak Surety	4–1	(England) Michael Williams
(Belgium) Tomasz Skalski	4–2	(Scotland) Dylan Craig
(Wales) Anthony Davies	4–1	(England) Mitchell Travis
(England) Zack Richardson	4–0	(England) Ashley Carty
(Russia) David Maslov	0–4	(England) Mark White
(England) Luke Garland	4–2	(England) Jake Nicholson

=== Main rounds ===
==== Top half ====
===== Section 1 =====
Last 128; Best of 7 frames
(Wales) Mark Williams	4
(England) James Cahill	0
(England) Tom Ford	4
(England) Adam Duffy	2
(England) Anthony Hamilton	4
(England) Adam Wicheard	2
(Scotland) Stephen Maguire	4
(Scotland) Ross Muir	0
(England) Stuart Carrington	3
(England) Joe Perry	4
(England) David Gilbert	4
(China) Cao Xinlong	3
(England) Judd Trump	4
(Wales) Alex Taubman	0
(Belgium) Luca Brecel	3
(England) Elliot Slessor	4

Last 64; Best of 7 frames
(Wales) Mark Williams	4
(England) Tom Ford	0
(England) Anthony Hamilton	4
(Scotland) Stephen Maguire	1
(England) Joe Perry	3
(England) David Gilbert	4
(England) Judd Trump	4
(England) Elliot Slessor	1

Last 32; Best of 7 frames
(Wales) Mark Williams	3
(England) Anthony Hamilton	4
(England) David Gilbert	0
(England) Judd Trump	4

Last 16; Best of 7 frames
(England) Anthony Hamilton	3
(England) Judd Trump	4

===== Section 2 =====
Last 128; Best of 7 frames
(England) Mark Davis	4
(Thailand) Dechawat Poomjaeng	1
(England) Chris Wakelin	4
(England) Liam Highfield	3
(England) Mike Dunn	4
(Wales) Jak Jones	2
(Scotland) Scott Donaldson	4
(England) Lee Page	3
(India) Pankaj Advani	4
(England) Sydney Wilson	0
(Northern Ireland) Gerard Greene	4
(Wales) Kishan Hirani	3
(England) Hammad Miah	0
(Thailand) Ratchayothin Yotharuck	4
(England) Michael Holt	4
(China) Lyu Haotian	3

Last 64; Best of 7 frames
(England) Mark Davis	3
(England) Chris Wakelin	4
(England) Mike Dunn	4
(Scotland) Scott Donaldson	2
(India) Pankaj Advani	4
(Northern Ireland) Gerard Greene	1
(Thailand) Ratchayothin Yotharuck	3
(England) Michael Holt	4

Last 32; Best of 7 frames
(England) Chris Wakelin	4
(England) Mike Dunn	3
(India) Pankaj Advani	3
(England) Michael Holt	4

Last 16; Best of 7 frames
(England) Chris Wakelin	4
(England) Michael Holt	2

===== Section 3 =====
Last 128; Best of 7 frames
(England) John Astley	3
(England) Peter Ebdon	4
(Republic of Ireland) Ken Doherty	1
(Switzerland) Alexander Ursenbacher	4
(India) Aditya Mehta	3
(China) Zhang Anda	4
(England) Michael Wasley	4
(Thailand) James Wattana	3
(Wales) Jamie Jones	4
(Wales) Andrew Rogers	2
(England) Mark King	4
(China) Chen Zhe	2
(Wales) Daniel Wells	2
(England) Ryan Clark	4
(England) Andrew Norman	4
(China) Li Hang	0

Last 64; Best of 7 frames
(England) Peter Ebdon	4
(Switzerland) Alexander Ursenbacher	3
(China) Zhang Anda	1
(England) Michael Wasley	4
(Wales) Jamie Jones	4
(England) Mark King	1
(England) Ryan Clark	0
(England) Andrew Norman	4

Last 32; Best of 7 frames
(England) Peter Ebdon	1
(England) Michael Wasley	4
(Wales) Jamie Jones	4
(England) Andrew Norman	2

Last 16; Best of 7 frames
(England) Michael Wasley	3
(Wales) Jamie Jones	4

===== Section 4 =====
Last 128; Best of 7 frames
(Wales) Dominic Dale	4
(England) Michael Wild	3
(England) Ian Burns	4
(England) Chris Norbury	0
(England) Alfie Burden	1
(Scotland) Jamie Burnett	4
(Wales) Matthew Stevens	3
(Scotland) Michael Leslie	4
(Scotland) Alan McManus	2
(England) Craig Steadman	4
(England) Stuart Bingham	4
(England) Jack Lisowski	1
(England) Ricky Walden	4
(England) Jamie Cope	2
(Republic of Ireland) David Morris	4
(Malta) Alex Borg	3

Last 64; Best of 7 frames
(Wales) Dominic Dale	0
(England) Ian Burns	4
(Scotland) Jamie Burnett	4
(Scotland) Michael Leslie	3
(England) Craig Steadman	0
(England) Stuart Bingham	4
(England) Ricky Walden	2
(Republic of Ireland) David Morris	4

Last 32; Best of 7 frames
(England) Ian Burns	4
(Scotland) Jamie Burnett	1
(England) Stuart Bingham	1
(Republic of Ireland) David Morris	4

Last 16; Best of 7 frames
(England) Ian Burns	4
(Republic of Ireland) David Morris	1

==== Bottom half ====
===== Section 5 =====
Last 128; Best of 7 frames
(Scotland) John Higgins	0
(England) Andrew Higginson	4
(England) Sam Baird	w/o
(China) Li Yan	w/d
(Wales) Ryan Day	4
(England) Jeff Cundy	0
(England) Barry Hawkins	4
(Thailand) Thepchaiya Un-Nooh	3
(Scotland) Marcus Campbell	4
(England) Paul Davison	3
(Northern Ireland) Joe Swail	0
(England) Dave Harold	4
(Wales) Michael White	4
(Wales) Duane Jones	2
(England) Ali Carter	4
(China) Yu Delu	1

Last 64; Best of 7 frames
(England) Andrew Higginson	0
(England) Sam Baird	4
(Wales) Ryan Day	4
(England) Barry Hawkins	2
(Scotland) Marcus Campbell	2
(England) Dave Harold	4
(Wales) Michael White	2
(England) Ali Carter	4

Last 32; Best of 7 frames
(England) Sam Baird	4
(Wales) Ryan Day	1
(England) Dave Harold	2
(England) Ali Carter	4

Last 16; Best of 7 frames
(England) Sam Baird	4
(England) Ali Carter	2

===== Section 6 =====
Last 128; Best of 7 frames
(England) Ben Woollaston	2
(England) Barry Pinches	4
(England) Jimmy Robertson	4
(Republic of Ireland) Leo Fernandez	2
(England) Kyren Wilson	w/o
(Qatar) Ahmed Saif	w/d
(England) Rod Lawler	3
(China) Liang Wenbo	4
(England) Mark Selby	4
(England) Zak Surety	0
(England) Robbie Williams	w/o
(England) Lee Spick	n/s
(England) David Grace	4
(Thailand) Noppon Saengkham	2
(England) Martin Gould	0
(Scotland) Graeme Dott	4

Last 64; Best of 7 frames
(England) Barry Pinches	4
(England) Jimmy Robertson	3
(England) Kyren Wilson	2
(China) Liang Wenbo	4
(England) Mark Selby	4
(England) Robbie Williams	3
(England) David Grace	1
(Scotland) Graeme Dott	4

Last 32; Best of 7 frames
(England) Barry Pinches	4
(China) Liang Wenbo	0
(England) Mark Selby	2
(Scotland) Graeme Dott	4

Last 16; Best of 7 frames
(England) Barry Pinches	2
(Scotland) Graeme Dott	4

===== Section 7 =====
Last 128; Best of 7 frames
(England) Gary Wilson	4
(England) Sean O'Sullivan	3
(England) Martin O'Donnell	4
(Wales) Andrew Pagett	2
(Northern Ireland) Mark Allen	4
(Belgium) Tomasz Skalski	2
(England) Matthew Selt	4
(England) Alex Davies	2
(England) Mark Joyce	2
(England) Rory McLeod	4
(England) Joel Walker	4
(Australia) Vinnie Calabrese	0
(England) Nigel Bond	4
(England) Jamie O'Neill	3
(Scotland) Anthony McGill	3
(Wales) Anthony Davies	4

Last 64; Best of 7 frames
(England) Gary Wilson	4
(England) Martin O'Donnell	3
(Northern Ireland) Mark Allen	4
(England) Matthew Selt	1
(England) Rory McLeod	0
(England) Joel Walker	4
(England) Nigel Bond	3
(Wales) Anthony Davies	4

Last 32; Best of 7 frames
(England) Gary Wilson	3
(Northern Ireland) Mark Allen	4
(England) Joel Walker	4
(Wales) Anthony Davies	2

Last 16; Best of 7 frames
(Northern Ireland) Mark Allen	4
(England) Joel Walker	1

===== Section 8 =====
Last 128; Best of 7 frames
(England) Robert Milkins	4
(England) Zack Richardson	1
(Norway) Kurt Maflin	4
(England) Jimmy White	0
(Republic of Ireland) Fergal O'Brien	4
(Thailand) Thanawat Thirapongpaiboon	2
(England) Peter Lines	4
(England) Allan Taylor	2
(Hong Kong) Marco Fu	4
(England) Mark White	1
(Australia) Neil Robertson	4
(Scotland) Fraser Patrick	0
(Malta) Tony Drago	2
(Finland) Robin Hull	4
(England) Ronnie O'Sullivan	4
(England) Luke Garland	1

Last 64; Best of 7 frames
(England) Robert Milkins	2
(Norway) Kurt Maflin	4
(Republic of Ireland) Fergal O'Brien	4
(England) Peter Lines	0
(Hong Kong) Marco Fu	3
(Australia) Neil Robertson	4
(Finland) Robin Hull	3
(England) Ronnie O'Sullivan	4

Last 32; Best of 7 frames
(Norway) Kurt Maflin	4
(Republic of Ireland) Fergal O'Brien	2
(Australia) Neil Robertson	4
(England) Ronnie O'Sullivan	2

Last 16; Best of 7 frames
(Norway) Kurt Maflin	1
(Australia) Neil Robertson	4

==== Finals ====
Quarter-finals; Best of 7 frames		Semi-finals; Best of 7 frames		Final; Best of 7 frames
(England) Judd Trump	4
(England) Chris Wakelin	2	(England) Judd Trump	4
(Wales) Jamie Jones	4	(Wales) Jamie Jones	3
(England) Ian Burns	2			(England) Judd Trump	1
(England) Sam Baird	1			(Northern Ireland) Mark Allen	4
(Scotland) Graeme Dott	4	(Scotland) Graeme Dott	2
(Northern Ireland) Mark Allen	4	(Northern Ireland) Mark Allen	4
(Australia) Neil Robertson	2

== Century breaks ==
- 140 – Ken Doherty
- 137, 136, 116, 102 – Mark Allen
- 136, 108 – Marco Fu
- 135, 110, 110, 108, 105 – Neil Robertson
- 134 – Ryan Day
- 133, 123 – Peter Ebdon
- 132 – Pankaj Advani
- 132 – Dominic Dale
- 132 – Ali Carter
- 128, 110, 110, 107, 107 – Judd Trump
- 128 – Alan McManus
- 126, 105 – Stuart Bingham
- 126 – Kurt Maflin
- 125 – Jamie Burnett
- 124, 123, 102 – Mark Selby
- 124 – Graeme Dott
- 123 – Jamie O'Neil
- 122 – Mark Davis
- 117 – David Morris
- 114 – Gary Wilson
- 110 – Stephen Maguire
- 110 – Thepchaiya Un-Nooh
- 107, 100 – Joel Walker
- 107 – Luca Brecel
- 105, 105 – Ronnie O'Sullivan
- 105, 103 – Dave Harold
- 101 – James Wattana
- 101 – Fergal O'Brien
- 101 – Sam Baird
- 100 – Chris Wakelin
