= 2012 Q School =

Snooker tournaments

Tournament information
- Dates: 13–29 May 2012
- Venue: World Snooker Academy
- City: Sheffield
- Country: England
- Format: Qualifying School
- Qualifiers: 12 via the 3 events

The 2012 Q School was a series of three snooker tournaments held at the start of the 2012–13 snooker season. An event for amateur players, it served as a qualification event for a place on the professional World Snooker Tour for the following two seasons. The events took place in May 2012 at the World Snooker Academy in Sheffield, England with a total 12 players qualifying via the three tournaments.

== Format ==
The 2012 Q School consisted of three events with 12 qualification places available. The two events had 115 entries competing for the 12 places on the main tour, four players qualifying from each of the three events. All matches were the best of seven frames.

== Event 1 ==
The first 2012 Q School event was held from 13 to 17 May 2012. Martin O'Donnell, Sam Baird, Ian Burns and Chen Zhe qualified. The results of the four final matches are given below.

- Martin O'Donnell (ENG) 4–1 Adrian Ridley (AUS)
- Sam Baird (ENG) 4–0 Nick Jennings (ENG)
- Ian Burns (ENG) 4–3 Rod Lawler (ENG)
- Chen Zhe (CHN) 4–1 Jordan Brown (NIR)

== Event 2 ==
The second 2012 Q School event was held from 19 to 23 May 2012. Daniel Wells, Jamie O'Neill, Sean O'Sullivan and Paul Davison qualified. The results of the four final matches are given below.

- Daniel Wells (WAL) 4–3 Michael Wasley (ENG)
- Jamie O'Neill (ENG) 4–2 Scott Donaldson (SCO)
- Sean O'Sullivan (ENG) 4–1 Ryan Causton (ENG)
- Paul Davison (ENG) 4–2 Gareth Allen (WAL)

== Event 3 ==
The third 2012 Q School event was held from 25 to 29 May 2012. Rod Lawler, Michael Wasley, Joel Walker and Robbie Williams qualified. The results of the four final matches are given below.

- Rod Lawler (ENG) 4–0 Joe Delaney (IRL)
- Michael Wasley (ENG) 4–3 Fraser Patrick (SCO)
- Joel Walker (ENG) 4–0 Justin Astley (ENG)
- Robbie Williams (ENG) 4–3 Mitchell Mann (ENG)

== Q School Order of Merit ==
A Q School Order of Merit was introduced for players who didn't qualify from the three events. The Order of Merit was used to top up fields for the 2012–13 snooker season where an event failed to attract the required number of entries. The rankings in the Order of Merit were based on the number of frames won in the three Q School events. The precise details are not known but a section of the Q School news says that "A new Q School ranking list will also be introduced, with players earning one point for every frame won. During the main tour season, should any of the tournament draws fall below a total entry of 96 (or 128 in 2013/14) then the field will be topped up to 96 or 128 with the highest ranked players from the Q-School list."

== Two-season performance of qualifiers ==
The following table shows the rankings of the 12 qualifiers from the 2012 Q School, at the end of the 2013–14 snooker season, the end of their two guaranteed seasons on the tour, together with their tour status for the 2014–15 snooker season. The rankings given here are the prize money rankings which replaced the points based system at the end of the 2013–14 season. Players in the top-64 of the prize money rankings retained their place on the tour while those outside the top-64 lost their place unless they qualified under a different category.

Player	End of 2013–14 season		Status for 2014–15 season
Player	Money	Ranking	Status for 2014–15 season
Martin O'Donnell (ENG)	17,968	92	Amateur
Sam Baird (ENG)	42,993	67	Qualified through the European Tour Order of Merit
Ian Burns (ENG)	39,537	73	Qualified through the European Tour Order of Merit
Chen Zhe (CHN)	21,123	89	Amateur
Daniel Wells (WAL)	12,263	100	Amateur
Jamie O'Neill (ENG)	14,377	97	Amateur
Sean O'Sullivan (ENG)	9,209	102	Amateur
Paul Davison (ENG)	27,601	82	Amateur
Rod Lawler (ENG)	88,294	39	Retained place on tour
Michael Wasley (ENG)	40,782	72	Qualified through the European Tour Order of Merit
Joel Walker (ENG)	31,512	80	Qualified through the European Tour Order of Merit
Robbie Williams (ENG)	49,375	62	Retained place on tour
