= Ian Burns (snooker player) =

English snooker player (born 1985)

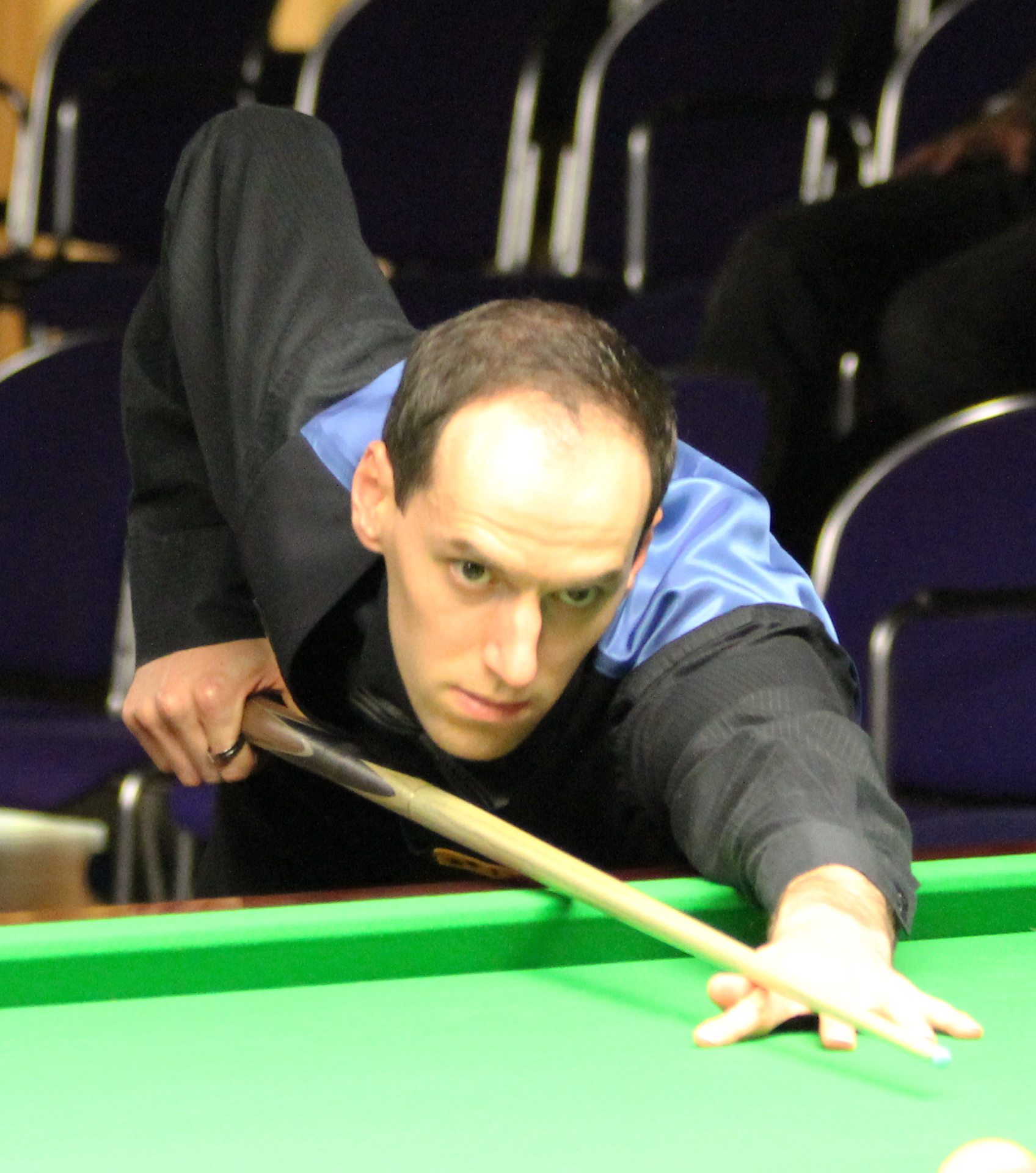
- Paul Hunter Classic 2012

Personal information
- Born: 11 March 1985 (age 41) Preston, England

Sport
- Country: England
- Sport: Snooker
- Professional: 2012–
- Highest ranking: 60 (April 2017)
- Current ranking: 78 (as of 7 November 2026)
- Best ranking finish: Quarter-final (x2)

Ian Burns (born 11 March 1985) is an English professional snooker player.

Burns turned professional after qualifying in his first attempt at the 2012 Q School and gained a two-year tour card for the 2012/13 and 2013/14 snooker seasons. He won four matches in the event, concluding with a 4–3 victory over veteran Rod Lawler to seal his card. He finished outside top 64 after the 2022-23 season but retained his tour card as a result of being one of the top 4 players outside that range to have the most number of points on the one-year list.

== Career ==
=== Debut season ===
Burns first match as a professional was a 3–5 defeat to Thanawat Thirapongpaiboon in qualifying for the 2012 Wuxi Classic. Burns reached the final qualifying round for the first time when attempting to reach the UK Championship. he defeated Michael Leslie, Kurt Maflin and Anthony Hamilton before being beaten 2–6 by Dominic Dale. Burns did come through four qualifying rounds to play in the main draw of a ranking event for the first time at the World Open, in Haikou, China. He defeated Saleh Mohammad 5–1 in the wildcard round, before losing by the same scoreline to top 16 player Barry Hawkins in the last 32.

The 2012 Welsh Open saw Burns qualify for his second ranking event, as he defeated Jack Lisowski 4–1 before receiving a walkover due to the withdrawal of Jamie Cope. At the main venue in Newport, he lost in the last 32 to 2010 World Champion Neil Robertson 1–4. Burns also had a very good season in the minor-ranking Players Tour Championship events, with his best finish coming at the fifth European Tour Event, where he beat the likes of Marcus Campbell and Liang Wenbo, but then lost to Ding Junhui in the quarter-finals. He also reached the last 16 in two other events which helped him finish 35th on the PTC Order of Merit, just outside the top 26 who qualified for the Finals. Burns beat Joel Walker 10–8 in the first round of World Championship Qualifying, but his season ended when he was defeated 2–10 by Yu Delu in the following round. Burns was awarded the Rookie of the Year Award at the World Snooker Annual Award Ceremony. Burns finished his first year on tour ranked world number 68, the highest of any of the debutants.

=== 2013/2014 season ===
In the second ranking event of the season, Burns beat Ryan Causton 5–3, Chen Zhe 5–2, and Matthew Selt 5–2 to qualify for the main stage of the Australian Goldfields Open, held in Bendigo. He played world number two Mark Selby in the first round and led the match 3–0, before Selby levelled at 3–3. Burns won the next frame and had numerous chances to secure a shock win but was ultimately defeated 5–4. At the Welsh Open he had a 4–3 win over Yu Delu, before losing 4–2 to Matthew Stevens in the last 64. In the minor-ranking European Tour events, Burns dropped just two frames in winning four matches to reach the quarter-finals of the Kay Suzanne Memorial Cup, where he was beaten 4–2 by Jamie Jones. Burns ended the season outside of the top 64 in the world rankings which would have relegated him from the tour, however by being placed 44th on the European Order of Merit he has received one of the eight spots to earn a two-year main tour card for the 2014–15 and 2015–16 seasons which were available to non-qualified players.

=== 2014/2015 season ===
Burns won three matches in the qualifying for the Australian Goldfields Open, before narrowly losing 5–4 to Mark Joyce in the final round. The first event he could reach this season was the International Championship and he beat Dominic Dale 6–5 and Craig Steadman 6–3 to reach the last 16 of a ranking event for the first time. He would be defeated 6–2 against Michael White, but lost two of the frames from 59–0 and 61–0 ahead which Burns felt flattered the scoreline. However, he failed to build on this during the rest of the season as he was eliminated in the first round of both the UK Championship and Welsh Open and could not qualify for any other event. Burns could also only win one match all year in the minor-ranking European Tour events.

=== 2015/2016 season ===
Burns played at the venue stage of six ranking events in the 2015–16 season, the most in a single year of his career so far. He won three matches to play in the Australian Goldfields Open and beat Xiao Guodong 5–3 in the first round which saw him play in the last 16 of a ranking event for the second time, but he lost 5–2 to Judd Trump. At the Paul Hunter Classic he recorded victories over Ryan Causton, Sanderson Lam, Martin O'Donnell and Thor Chuan Leong to make the quarter-finals, where he was defeated 4–0 by Mark King. A week later he beat King 6–2 to qualify for the International Championship, but lost 6–3 to Mark Williams. Burns saw off Aditya Mehta 5–1 and John Higgins 5–3 to make his debut at the German Masters and was edged out 5–4 by Michael Holt in the first round. The final ranking event Burns qualified for this season was the China Open and, after coming through a wildcard round, he whitewashed Peter Ebdon 5–0, before losing 5–3 to Stuart Bingham. Burns reached the final qualifying round for the World Championship, but was heavily defeated 10–2 by Ebdon. His end of season ranking of 62 is the highest of his career to date and the first time he has been within the top 64.

=== 2016/2017 season ===
Burns qualified for the World Open and lost 5–2 to Neil Robertson in the first round. He lost in the third round of the Scottish Open and Welsh Open without picking up a frame. Burns qualified for the China Open, but was defeated 5–1 by John Higgins in the opening round. At 66th in the world rankings, Burns would have lost his place on the tour due to not being in the top 64, but he took the final spot on the one-year list to be awarded a two-year card.

== Personal life ==
Burns married Alison, an accountant of Lancashire County Council, in May 2014. They have been together since 2010.

In 2025, Burns launched a YouTube channel, Ian Burns Snooker Coaching, aiming to help viewers improve their game through showing them technique tips, drills and exercises.

He completed an Ironman Triathlon in 2024.

== Performance and rankings timeline ==
Tournament	2010/ 11	2011/ 12	2012/ 13	2013/ 14	2014/ 15	2015/ 16	2016/ 17	2017/ 18	2018/ 19	2019/ 20	2020/ 21	2021/ 22	2022/ 23	2023/ 24	2024/ 25	2025/ 26	2026/ 27
Ranking (Note: It shows the ranking at the beginning of the season)	(Note: He was an amateur)		(Note: New players on the Main Tour don't have a ranking)	68	(Note: Players qualified through European Tour Order of Merit started the season without prize money ranking points)	89	62	(Note: Players qualified through One Year Ranking List started the season without ranking points)	73		65	(Note: Players qualified through Q School started the season without ranking points)	85		74		76
Ranking tournaments
Championship League	Non-Ranking Event										RR	RR	RR	RR	RR	RR	2R
China Open	A	A	LQ	LQ	LQ	2R	1R	LQ	LQ	Tournament Not Held							LQ
Wuhan Open	Tournament Not Held													1R	LQ	LQ	LQ
British Open	Tournament Not Held											2R	1R	LQ	LQ	2R	WD
English Open	Tournament Not Held						2R	LQ	2R	1R	1R	LQ	LQ	LQ	1R	LQ	WD
Shenzhen Open (Note: The event was called the Xi'an Grand Prix (2024/2025–2025/2026))	Tournament Not Held														LQ	LQ	WD
Northern Ireland Open	Tournament Not Held						1R	1R	2R	2R	1R	LQ	LQ	2R	LQ	1R	LQ
International Championship	Not Held		LQ	LQ	3R	1R	WR	1R	2R	LQ	Not Held			LQ	LQ	LQ	LQ
UK Championship	A	A	LQ	1R	1R	1R	1R	1R	2R	3R	1R	1R	LQ	LQ	LQ	LQ	
Shoot Out	Non-Ranking Event						1R	1R	1R	3R	1R	3R	1R	2R	1R	1R	
Scottish Open	Not Held		MR	Not Held			3R	1R	4R	2R	1R	LQ	LQ	LQ	1R	1R	
German Masters	A	A	LQ	LQ	LQ	LQ	LQ	LQ	LQ	1R	LQ	LQ	LQ	LQ	LQ	LQ	LQ
Welsh Open	A	A	1R	2R	1R	1R	3R	QF	4R	2R	1R	LQ	LQ	1R	LQ	LQ	
World Grand Prix	Tournament Not Held				NR	DNQ	DNQ	DNQ	DNQ	DNQ	DNQ	DNQ	DNQ	DNQ	DNQ	DNQ	
Players Championship (Note: The event was called the Players Tour Championship Grand Final (2010/2011–2015/2016))	DNQ	DNQ	DNQ	DNQ	DNQ	DNQ	DNQ	DNQ	DNQ	DNQ	DNQ	DNQ	DNQ	DNQ	DNQ	DNQ	
World Open	A	A	1R	LQ	Not Held		1R	1R	LQ	1R	Not Held			LQ	LQ	2R	
Tour Championship	Tournament Not Held								DNQ	DNQ	DNQ	DNQ	DNQ	DNQ	DNQ	DNQ	
World Championship	A	A	LQ	LQ	LQ	LQ	LQ	LQ	LQ	LQ	LQ	LQ	LQ	LQ	LQ	LQ	
Non-ranking tournaments
Championship League	A	A	A	A	A	A	A	A	A	RR	A	A	A	A	A	A	
Former ranking tournaments
Wuxi Classic	Non-Ranking		LQ	LQ	LQ	Tournament Not Held											
Australian Goldfields Open	NH	A	LQ	1R	LQ	2R	Tournament Not Held										
Shanghai Masters	A	A	LQ	LQ	LQ	LQ	LQ	LQ	Non-Ranking		Not Held			Non-Ranking Event			
Paul Hunter Classic	Minor-Ranking Event						1R	QF	2R	NR	Tournament Not Held						
Indian Open	Not Held			LQ	LQ	NH	LQ	LQ	1R	Tournament Not Held							
Riga Masters (Note: The event was called the Riga Open (2014/2015–2015/2016))	Tournament Not Held				Minor-Rank		2R	LQ	1R	LQ	Tournament Not Held						
China Championship	Tournament Not Held						NR	1R	LQ	LQ	Tournament Not Held						
WST Pro Series	Tournament Not Held										RR	Tournament Not Held					
Turkish Masters	Tournament Not Held											LQ	Tournament Not Held				
Gibraltar Open	Tournament Not Held					MR	1R	1R	2R	1R	1R	1R	Tournament Not Held				
WST Classic	Tournament Not Held												1R	Tournament Not Held			
European Masters	Tournament Not Held						LQ	LQ	LQ	LQ	2R	1R	1R	LQ	Not Held		
Saudi Arabia Masters	Tournament Not Held														2R	1R	NH
Former non-ranking tournaments
Shoot Out	A	A	A	1R	A	3R	Ranking Event										
Six-red World Championship	A	NH	A	A	A	A	A	A	A	A	Not Held		LQ	Tournament Not Held			

Performance Table Legend
LQ	lost in the qualifying draw	#R	lost in the early rounds of the tournament (WR = Wildcard round, RR = Round robin)	QF	lost in the quarter-finals
SF	lost in the semi-finals	F	lost in the final	W	won the tournament
DNQ	did not qualify for the tournament	A	did not participate in the tournament	WD	withdrew from the tournament

NH / Not Held	means an event was not held.
NR / Non-Ranking Event	means an event is/was no longer a ranking event.
R / Ranking Event	means an event is/was a ranking event.
MR / Minor-Ranking Event	means an event is/was a minor-ranking event.
