= Joel Walker (snooker player) =

English snooker player (born 1994)

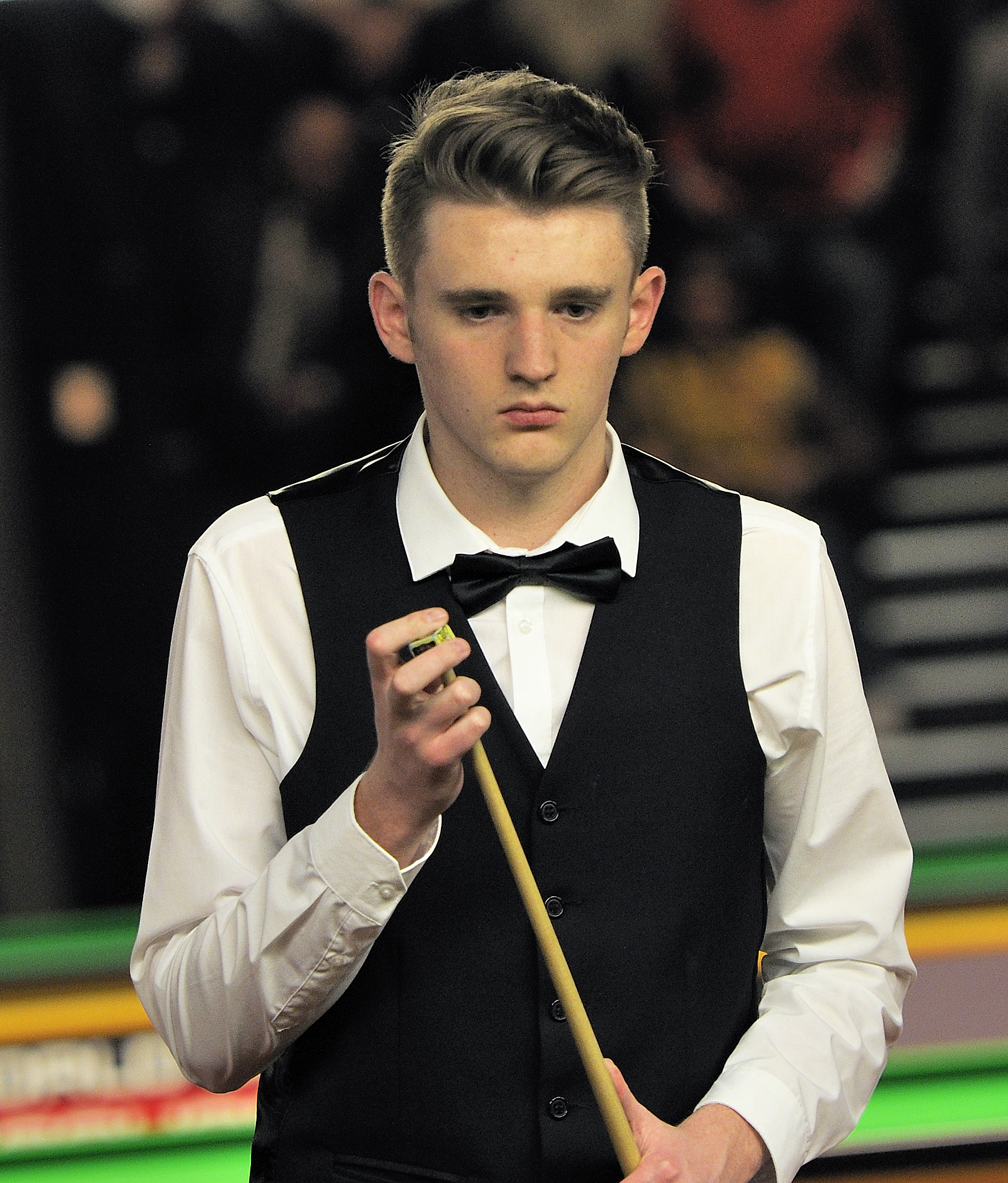
- Walker at the 2014 German Masters

Personal information
- Born: 16 March 1994 (age 32) Sheffield, South Yorkshire, England

Sport
- Country: England
- Sport: Snooker
- Professional: 2012–2016
- Highest ranking: 72 (August 2015)
- Best ranking finish: Quarter-final (x1)

Joel Walker (born 16 March 1994) is an English former professional snooker player. In 2010 he won the Rileys Future Stars competition and turned professional in 2012 through Q School.

== Career ==
=== Amateur years ===
In 2010 Walker won Rileys Future Stars competition, and won £5,000 and coaching sessions with Ronnie O'Sullivan. The same year he was invited to compete in the World Open. He defeated Julian Logue 3–1 in the first qualifying round, but lost 1–3 against Tony Drago in the next round. Walker also competed at the Players Tour Championship, with his best result coming at the fourth event in Sheffield, where he reached the last 64 and lost 0–4 against Robert Milkins. He finished 137th on the Order of Merit. He tried unsuccessfully to turn professional through the Q School, with his best result coming in the second tournament, where he reached the last 16, but lost 1–4 against Simon Bedford.

Walker competed at the Players Tour Championship also in the 2011–12 season. His best result came at the second and third UK event, where he reached the last 128, but lost 1–4 against Stephen Lee and 0–4 against Ding Junhui respectively. He finished 531st on the Order of Merit. Walker turned professional after coming through Event 3 of the 2012 Q School and gained a two-year tour card for the 2012–13 and 2013–14 snooker seasons. He won five consecutive matches in the event, culminating in a 4–0 victory against Justin Astley.

=== Debut season ===
Walker's first match as a professional was a 5–4 win over Cao Yupeng, who had reached the last 16 of the World Championship two months earlier. Walker lost to Peter Lines by the same scoreline in the next round. He did not win a qualifying match for a ranking event during the rest of the season. Walker fared better in the minor-ranking Players Tour Championship events as he played in all ten tournaments, with his best result coming in the Scottish Open, where he beat Andrew Pagett and Stuart Bingham, before losing 2–4 to Liang Wenbo in the last 32. He was placed 76th on the PTC Order of Merit, and finished his first year on tour ranked world number 90.

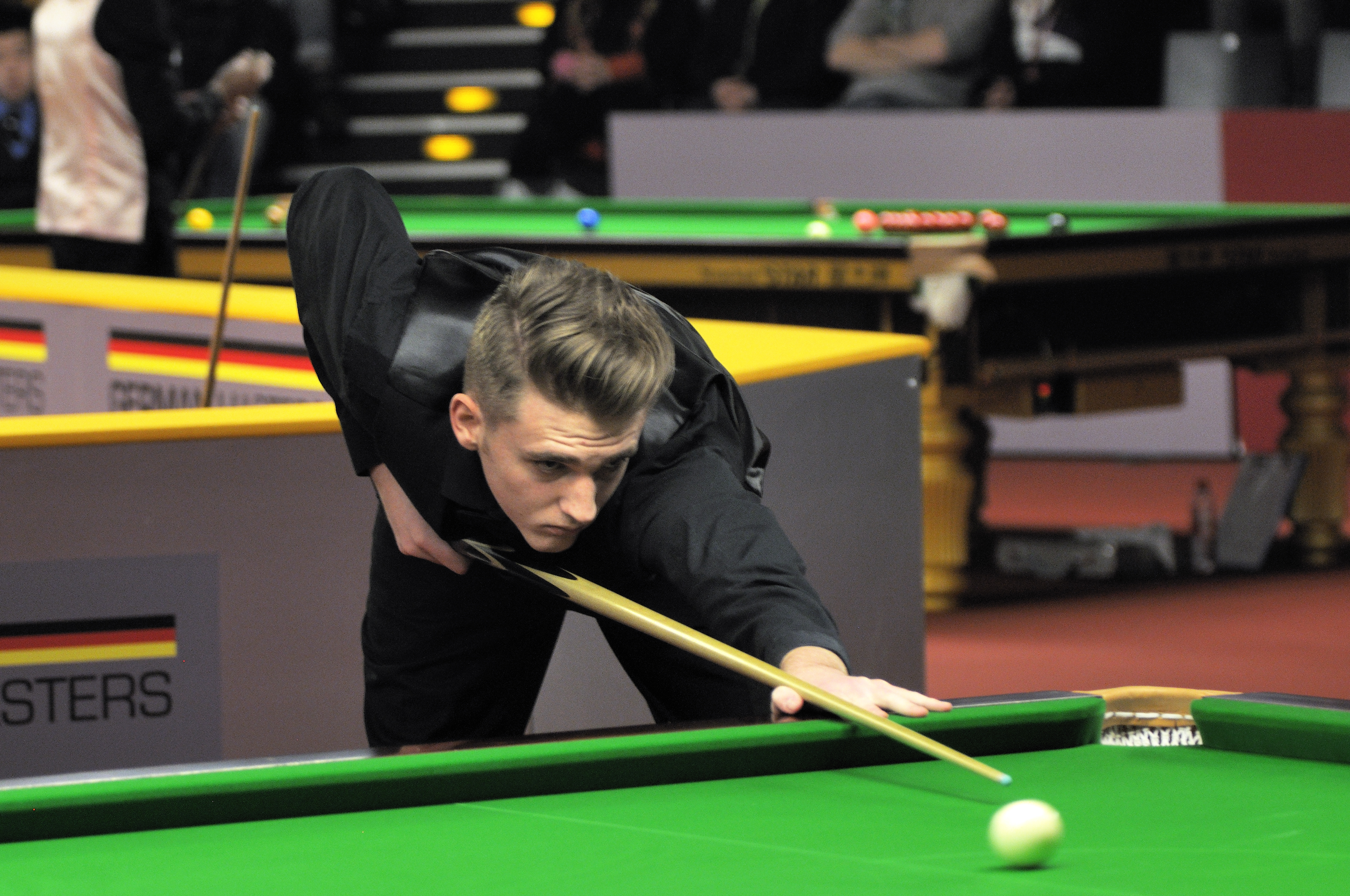
Joel Walker at 2014 German Masters

=== 2013/2014 season ===
In his opening match, Walker defeated Ian Burns 5–2 to qualify for the 2013 Wuxi Classic in China. In Walker's first appearance in the main draw of a ranking event, he defeated Alex Davies 5–2 in the first round to progress to the last 32 stage, where he lost 5–2 against Ben Woollaston. Walker failed to qualify for the next four ranking tournaments, and lost in the last 128 match of the UK Championship. He started 2014 by reaching the last 32 of the German Masters, and then went even further at the Welsh Open, defeating Pankaj Advani, Mark Davis, James Wattana and defending champion Stephen Maguire to reach his first ever major quarter-final. He led world number three Ding Junhui 4–2 and missed several chances to wrap up a win which would have doubled his previous career prize money earnings to be defeated 5–4.

After Walker was edged out of the second round of World Championship qualifying 10–9 by Jamie Jones he ended the year ranked world number 80, outside of the top 64 in the rankings and would be relegated from the tour. However, he performed very well throughout the season in the European Tour events, reaching the last 16 of the Kay Suzanne Memorial Cup and the quarter-finals of the Antwerp Open. As a result, he finished 35th on the Order of Merit to claim the second of eight spots which were available to non-qualified players to play on the main tour for the 2014–15 and 2015–16 seasons.

=== 2014/2015 season ===
The first ranking event Walker could qualify for during the 2014–15 season was the International Championship thanks to a 6–4 win over Ken Doherty. Walker drew Martin Gould in the first round and made a century and two further breaks above 50 to level at 4–4 after being 4–1 down, but then lost two frames in a row to exit the tournament. He eliminated Alan McManus 6–1 and Tom Ford 6–3 at the UK Championship and then led world number 11 Stuart Bingham 3–0, but went on to lose in a deciding frame. Walker was knocked out of the first round of the Welsh Open and Indian Open 4–2 by Mark Joyce and 4–0 by Matthew Selt. Before the start of the World Championship, Walker stated his desire to become the first player from Sheffield to play in the event, but he lost 10–6 to Stuart Carrington in the first qualifying round.

=== 2015/2016 season ===
Walker made his debut in the Australian Goldfields Open thanks to beating Jamie Cope 5–2, Adam Duffy 5–3 and Gary Wilson 5–3 in the qualifiers, but was thrashed 5–0 by Stephen Maguire in the first round. He was whitewashed in the opening round of two other ranking events, 6–0 by Joe Swail at the UK Championship and 4–0 by Marco Fu at the Welsh Open. Walker entered Q School as he dropped off the tour at the end of the season by being placed 80th in the world rankings. He only won one match during the two events to confirm his relegation.

=== 2016/2017 season ===
In the second event of 2017 Q School, Walker was two victories away from rejoining the professional tour, but lost 4–3 in the fifth round to Joe Swail.

== Performance and rankings timeline ==
Tournament	2012/ 13	2013/ 14	2014/ 15	2015/ 16
Ranking (Note: It shows the ranking at the beginning of the season.)	(Note: New players on the Main Tour don't have a ranking.)	90	(Note: Players qualified through European Tour Order of Merit started the season without prize money ranking points.)	87
Ranking tournaments
Australian Goldfields Open	LQ	LQ	LQ	1R
Shanghai Masters	LQ	LQ	LQ	LQ
International Championship	LQ	LQ	1R	LQ
UK Championship	LQ	1R	3R	1R
German Masters	LQ	2R	LQ	LQ
Welsh Open	LQ	QF	1R	1R
World Grand Prix (Note: The event was called the World Open (2010/2011) and the Haikou World Open (2011/2012–2013/2014))	LQ	LQ	NR	DNQ
Players Championship Grand Final (Note: The event was called the Players Tour Championship Grand Finals (2010/2011–2012/2013))	DNQ	DNQ	DNQ	DNQ
China Open	LQ	LQ	LQ	LQ
World Championship	LQ	LQ	LQ	LQ
Former ranking tournaments
Wuxi Classic	LQ	2R	LQ	NH
Indian Open	NH	LQ	1R	NH

Performance Table Legend
LQ	lost in the qualifying draw	#R	lost in the early rounds of the tournament	QF	lost in the quarter-finals
SF	lost in the semi-finals	F	lost in the final	W	won the tournament
DNQ	did not qualify for the tournament	A	did not participate in the tournament	WD	withdrew from the tournament

NH / Not Held	means an event was not held.
NR / Non-Ranking Event	means an event is/was no longer a ranking event.
R / Ranking Event	means an event is/was a ranking event.
MR / Minor-Ranking Event	means an event is/was a minor-ranking event.

== Career finals ==
=== Amateur finals: 1 (1 title) ===
Outcome	No.	Year	Championship	Opponent in the final	Score
Winner	1.	2018	Challenge Tour – Event 7	(England) Jenson Kendrick	3–0
