= Kay Suzanne Memorial Cup =

Snooker tournament

Tournament information
- Venue: The Capital Venue
- Location: Gloucester
- Country: England
- Established: 2011
- Organisation(s): World Professional Billiards and Snooker Association
- Format: Minor-ranking event
- Total prize fund: €100,400
- Final year: 2013
- Final champion: (Northern Ireland) Mark Allen

The Kay Suzanne Memorial Cup (formerly known as the Kay Suzanne Memorial Trophy) was a professional minor-ranking snooker tournament, which was part of the Players Tour Championship. The tournament started in 2011 and was staged at the Capital Venue (Note: In the first two years the venue used the South West Snooker Academy name.) in Gloucester, England. Mark Allen was the last champion.

The tournament was named in memory of Capital Venue owner Paul Mount's late sister, who had died of breast cancer. The players wore pink shirts to raise awareness of the disease. The Pink Ribbon tournament was also held at the venue under a similar premise.

== Winners ==
Year	Winner	Runner-up	Final score	Season
Kay Suzanne Memorial Trophy (minor-ranking)
2011	(England) Ronnie O'Sullivan	(Wales) Matthew Stevens	4–2	2011/12
2012	(Scotland) John Higgins	(England) Judd Trump	4–2	2012/13
Kay Suzanne Memorial Cup (minor-ranking) (Note: The event used the Kay Suzanne Memorial Cup title as an alternative name in 2012.)
2013	(Northern Ireland) Mark Allen	(England) Judd Trump	4–1	2013/14

== See also ==
- 2010 Euro Players Tour Championship - Event 4 (also known as the MIUS Cup)
- Pink Ribbon (snooker)
