= Pink Ribbon (snooker) =

Tournament held in England

Tournament information
- Venue: Landywood Snooker Club
- Location: Walsall
- Country: England
- Established: 2010
- Format: Pro–am
- Recent edition: 2026
- Current champion: (England) Stan Moody

The Pink Ribbon is a pro–am charity snooker tournament. Established in 2010 in Gloucester, England, the tournament raised funds for breast cancer charities and had the players all wear pink shirts to show their support. When The Capital Venue closed down in 2019, the tournament was not held for the next 4 years.

In May 2024, it was announced that a new Pink Ribbon event was to take place later that year - raising money for the same charity, with the players once again all wearing pink shirts. It was held in July in Walsall, with Oliver Lines taking the title. The current champion is Stan Moody.

== Winners ==
Year	Winner	Runner-up	Final score	Venue	City	Season	Ref.
Pink Ribbon (pro-am)
2010	(England) Michael Holt	(England) Jimmy White	6–5	The Capital Venue	Gloucester, England	2010/11	
2011	(England) Mark Joyce	(England) Michael Holt	4–0	The Capital Venue	Gloucester, England	2011/12	
2012	(England) Stuart Bingham	(England) Peter Lines	4–0	The Capital Venue	Gloucester, England	2012/13	
2013	(England) Joe Perry	(England) Barry Hawkins	4–3	The Capital Venue	Gloucester, England	2013/14	
2014	(England) Peter Lines	(Wales) Lee Walker	4–1	The Capital Venue	Gloucester, England	2014/15	
2015	(England) Ronnie O'Sullivan	(England) Darryn Walker	4–2	The Capital Venue	Gloucester, England	2015/16	
2016	(Wales) Jamie Jones	(England) David Grace	4–3	The Capital Venue	Gloucester, England	2016/17	
2017	(England) Robert Milkins	(England) Rob James	4–2	The Capital Venue	Gloucester, England	2017/18	
2018	(England) Andrew Norman	(England) Harvey Chandler	4–2	The Capital Venue	Gloucester, England	2018/19	
2019	(England) Stuart Bingham	(Northern Ireland) Mark Allen	4–3	The Capital Venue	Gloucester, England	2019/20	
2020–2023	Not held						
2024	(England) Oliver Lines	(England) Elliot Slessor	4–3	Landywood Snooker Club	Walsall, England	2024/25	
2025	(England) Chris Wakelin	(England) Craig Steadman	5–3	Landywood Snooker Club	Walsall, England	2025/26	
2026	Stan Moody (ENG)	Mark Joyce (ENG)	4–2	Landywood Snooker Club	Walsall, England	2026/27	

== See also ==
- Kay Suzanne Memorial Cup
