= FFB Open =

Tournament information
- Venue: World Snooker Academy; Event Forum
- Location: Sheffield; Fürstenfeldbruck
- Country: England; Germany
- Established: 2011
- Organisation(s): World Professional Billiards and Snooker Association
- Format: Minor-ranking event
- Total prize fund: €70,000
- Final year: 2012
- Final champion: (England) Mark Selby

The FFB Open was a pro–am minor-ranking snooker tournament, which was part of the Players Tour Championship. The tournament was only held in the 2011/2012 and 2012/2013 seasons. The event was split in two parts, with the first part taking place at the World Snooker Academy in Sheffield, England and the second part at the Event Forum in Fürstenfeldbruck, Germany. Mark Selby was the last champion.

== Winners ==
Year	Winner	Runner-up	Final score	Season
FFB Snooker Open (minor-ranking)
2012	(Scotland) Stephen Maguire	(England) Joe Perry	4–2	2011/12
FFB Open (minor-ranking)
2013	(England) Mark Selby	(Scotland) Graeme Dott	4–3	2012/13
