= 2011–12 snooker season =

Series of snooker tournaments

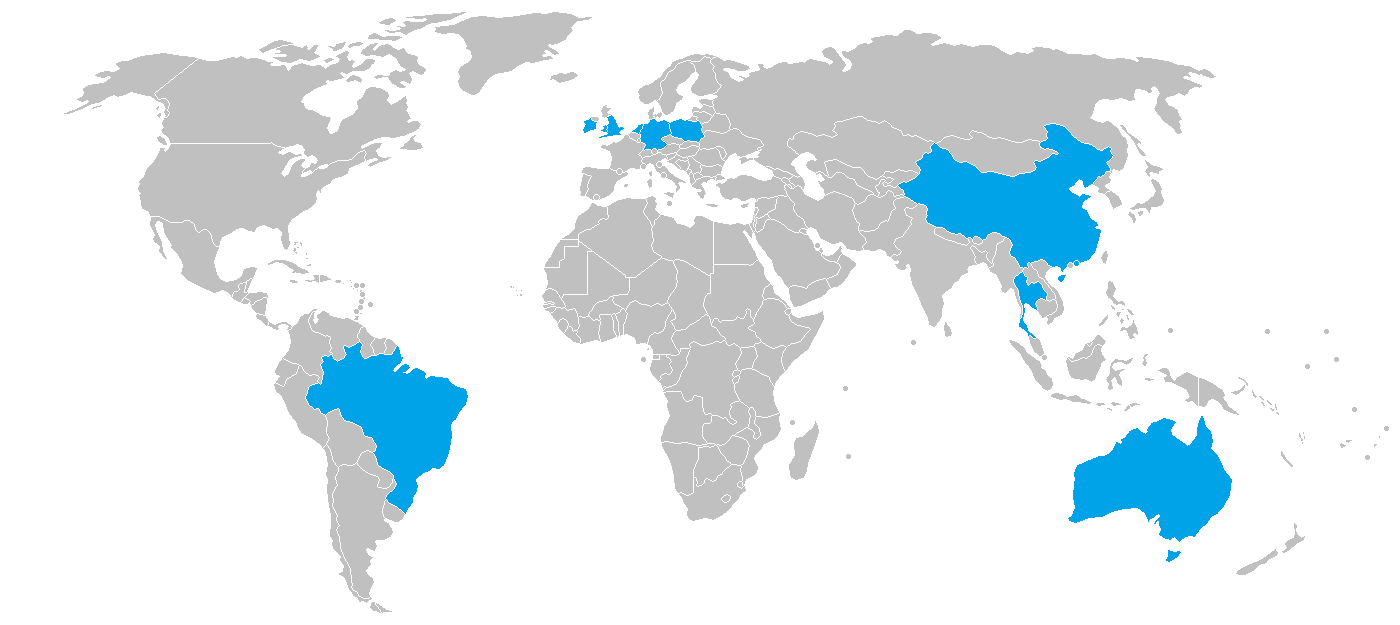
- Nations that hosted an event in the snooker calendar during the 2011–12 season

Details
- Duration: 1 June 2011 – 7 May 2012
- Tournaments: 34 (9 ranking events)

Triple Crown winners
- UK Championship: (England) Judd Trump
- Masters: (Australia) Neil Robertson
- World Championship: (England) Ronnie O'Sullivan

The 2011–12 snooker season was a series of snooker tournaments played between 1 June 2011 and 7 May 2012. The Brazil Masters became the first major professional event held in South America, and the Australian Goldfields Open the first ranking event in Australia. The World Cup was held again after 1996. At the end of the season Ronnie O'Sullivan was named the World Snooker Player of the Year and the Snooker Writers Player of the Year, Judd Trump the Fans Player of the Year and Luca Brecel the Rookie of the Year. Stuart Bingham received the "Performance of the Year" for winning his first ranking event, the Australian Goldfields Open. Stephen Hendry's maximum break at the World Championship received "The Magic Moment" award. Walter Donaldson, Mark Williams, John Higgins and Ronnie O'Sullivan were inducted into the Hall of Fame.

== New professional players ==
Countries

- Belgium
- China
- England
- Finland
- India
- Ireland
- Northern Ireland
- Poland
- Scotland
- Thailand
- Wales

Note: new in this case means that these players were not on the 2010/2011 professional Main Tour.

International champions:

1. IBSF World Snooker Championship winner: (Thailand) Dechawat Poomjaeng
2. IBSF World Under-21 Snooker Championship winner: (England) Sam Craigie
3. EBSA European Under-21 Snooker Championships winner: (Poland) Kacper Filipiak
4. ACBS Asian Snooker Championship winner: (Thailand) Passakorn Suwannawat
5. ACBS Asian Under-21 Snooker Championship winner: (China) Cao Yupeng

NGB nominations

6. English nomination: (Note: Sam Baird qualified by topping the Pro Ticket Tour rankings.) (England) Sam Baird
7. Welsh nomination: (Note: Daniel Wells qualified by topping the Welsh rankings.) (Wales) Daniel Wells
8. Scottish nomination: (Note: Scott MacKenzie qualified by topping the Scottish rankings.) (Scotland) Scott MacKenzie
9. Northern Irish nomination: (Note: Joe Meara qualified by topping the Northern Irish rankings.) (Northern Ireland) Joe Meara
10. Irish nomination: (Note: David Hogan qualified by topping the Irish rankings.) (Republic of Ireland) David Hogan
11. ACBS Asian Nomination: (India) Aditya Mehta

Q School:

12. (England) Andrew Norman
13. (England) David Grace
14. (England) Adam Wicheard
15. (Finland) Robin Hull
16. (China) Li Yan
17. (Republic of Ireland) David Morris
18. (England) Simon Bedford
19. (China) Tian Pengfei
20. (Norway) Kurt Maflin
21. (England) Stuart Carrington
22. (England) Adam Duffy
23. (England) David Gilbert

WPBSA Wildcard

24. (China) Yu Delu
25. (India) Lucky Vatnani
26. (Belgium) Luca Brecel

== Calendar ==
The following table outlines the results and dates for all the ranking and major invitational events.

=== World Snooker Tour ===
Start	Finish	Tournament	Venue	Winner	Score	Runner-up	Ref.
18 Jun	22 Jun	Players Tour Championship – Event 1‡	World Snooker Academy in Sheffield, England	Ronnie O'Sullivan (ENG)	4–0	Joe Perry (ENG)	
7 Jul	10 Jul	Wuxi Classic†	Wuxi City Sports Park Stadium in Wuxi, China	Mark Selby (ENG)	9–7	Ali Carter (ENG)	
11 Jul	17 Jul	World Cup†	World Trade Center in Bangkok, Thailand	China	4–2	Northern Ireland	
18 Jul	24 Jul	Australian Goldfields Open	Bendigo Stadium in Bendigo, Australia	Stuart Bingham (ENG)	9–8	Mark Williams (WAL)	
6 Aug	10 Aug	Players Tour Championship – Event 2‡	South West Snooker Academy in Gloucester, England	Judd Trump (ENG)	4–0	Ding Junhui (CHN)	
17 Aug	21 Aug	Players Tour Championship – Event 3‡	World Snooker Academy in Sheffield, England	Ben Woollaston (ENG)	4–2	Graeme Dott (SCO)	
25 Aug	28 Aug	Players Tour Championship – Event 4‡ (Note: Event also known as the 2011 Paul Hunter Classic)	Stadthalle in Fürth, Germany	Mark Selby (ENG)	4–0	Mark Davis (ENG)	
5 Sep	11 Sep	Shanghai Masters	Shanghai Grand Stage in Shanghai, China	Mark Selby (ENG)	10–9	Mark Williams (WAL)	
15 Sep	18 Sep	Brazil Masters†	Costão do Santinho Resort in Florianópolis, Brazil	Shaun Murphy (ENG)	5–0	Graeme Dott (SCO)	
21 Sep	25 Sep	Players Tour Championship – Event 5‡	World Snooker Academy in Sheffield, England	Andrew Higginson (ENG)	4–1	John Higgins (SCO)	
29 Sep	2 Oct	Players Tour Championship – Event 6‡ (Note: Event also known as the 2011 Warsaw Classic)	Arena Ursynów in Warsaw, Poland	Neil Robertson (AUS)	4–1	Ricky Walden (ENG)	
5 Oct	9 Oct	Players Tour Championship – Event 7‡ (Note: Event also known as the 2011 Kay Suzanne Memorial Trophy)	South West Snooker Academy in Gloucester, England	Ronnie O'Sullivan (ENG)	4–2	Matthew Stevens (WAL)	
20 Oct	23 Oct	Players Tour Championship – Event 8‡ (Note: Event also known as the 2011 Alex Higgins International Trophy)	Killarney Convention Centre in Killarney, Ireland	Neil Robertson (AUS)	4–1	Judd Trump (ENG)	
10 Nov	13 Nov	Players Tour Championship – Event 9‡ (Note: Event also known as the 2011 Antwerp Open)	Lotto Arena in Antwerp, Belgium	Judd Trump (ENG)	4–3	Ronnie O'Sullivan (ENG)	
18 Aug	27 Nov	Premier League†	Potters Leisure Resort in Hopton-on-Sea, England	Ronnie O'Sullivan (ENG)	7–1	Ding Junhui (CHN)	
27 Nov	30 Nov	Players Tour Championship – Event 10‡	World Snooker Academy in Sheffield, England	Michael Holt (ENG)	4–2	Dominic Dale (WAL)	
3 Dec	11 Dec	UK Championship	Barbican Centre in York, England	Judd Trump (ENG)	10–8	Mark Allen (NIR)	
17 Dec	19 Dec	Players Tour Championship – Event 11‡	English Institute of Sport in Sheffield, England	Tom Ford (ENG)	4–3	Martin Gould (ENG)	
15 Dec	16 Dec	Players Tour Championship – Event 12‡ (Note: Event also known as the 2012 FFB Snooker Open and the 2012 Arcaden Shopping Open)	World Snooker Academy in Sheffield, England	Stephen Maguire (SCO)	4–2	Joe Perry (ENG)	
6 Jan	8 Jan	Players Tour Championship – Event 12‡	Event Forum in Fürstenfeldbruck, Germany	Stephen Maguire (SCO)	4–2	Joe Perry (ENG)	
15 Jan	22 Jan	Masters†	Alexandra Palace in London, England	Neil Robertson (AUS)	10–6	Shaun Murphy (ENG)	
27 Jan	29 Jan	Snooker Shoot Out†	Circus Arena in Blackpool, England	Barry Hawkins (ENG)	1–0	Graeme Dott (SCO)	
1 Feb	5 Feb	German Masters	Tempodrom in Berlin, Germany	Ronnie O'Sullivan (ENG)	9–7	Stephen Maguire (SCO)	
13 Feb	19 Feb	Welsh Open	Newport Centre in Newport, Wales	Ding Junhui (CHN)	9–6	Mark Selby (ENG)	
27 Feb	4 Mar	World Open	Haikou Stadium in Haikou, China	Mark Allen (NIR)	10–1	Stephen Lee (ENG)	
14 Mar	18 Mar	Players Tour Championship Finals	Bailey Allen Hall in Galway, Ireland	Stephen Lee (ENG)	4–0	Neil Robertson (AUS)	
9 Jan	22 Mar	Championship League†	Crondon Park Golf Club in Stock, England	Ding Junhui (CHN)	3–1	Judd Trump (ENG)	
26 Mar	1 Apr	China Open	Beijing University Students' Gymnasium in Beijing, China	Peter Ebdon (ENG)	10–9	Stephen Maguire (SCO)	
21 Apr	7 May	World Snooker Championship	Crucible Theatre in Sheffield, England	Ronnie O'Sullivan (ENG)	18–11	Ali Carter (ENG)	

Ranking event
‡ Minor-ranking event
† Non-ranking event

=== World Ladies Billiards and Snooker Association ===
Start	Finish	Tournament	Venue	Winner	Score	Runner-up	Ref.
24 Sep		Northern Championship	North East Derbyshire Snooker Centre in Chesterfield, England	Maria Catalano (ENG)	3–1	Ching Ching Yu (HKG)	
30 Oct		UK Ladies Championship	Woking Snooker Centre in Woking, England	Reanne Evans (ENG)	3–2	Emma Bonney (ENG)	
26 Nov		East Anglian Championship	Pot Black Sports Bar in Bury St Edmunds, England	Maria Catalano (ENG)	3–0	Katie Henrick (ENG)	
28 Jan		Southern Classic	Fareham Snooker Club in Fareham, England	Emma Bonney (ENG)	3–1	Jaique Ip (HKG)	
25 Feb		Connie Gough Memorial	Jesters Snooker in Swindon, England	Maria Catalano (ENG)	3–0	Jaique Ip (HKG)	
20 Apr	22 Apr	World Ladies Championship	Cambridge Snooker Centre in Cambridge, England	Reanne Evans (ENG)	5–3	Maria Catalano (ENG)	

=== Seniors events ===
Start	Finish	Tournament	Venue	Winner	Score	Runner-up	Ref.
5 Nov	6 Nov	World Seniors Championship	East of England Showground in Peterborough, England	Darren Morgan (WAL)	2–1	Steve Davis (ENG)	

=== Other events ===
Start	Finish	Tournament	Venue	Winner	Score	Runner-up	Ref.
1 Jun	5 Jun	Pink Ribbon	South West Snooker Academy in Gloucester, England	Mark Joyce (ENG)	4–0	Michael Holt (ENG)	
4 Jul	7 Jul	General Cup International	General Snooker Club in Hong Kong, China	Stephen Lee (ENG)	7–6	Ricky Walden (ENG)	
29 Oct	30 Oct	Irish Classic	Celbridge Snooker Club in Kildare, Ireland	Fergal O'Brien (IRL)	5–2	Ken Doherty (IRL)	
19 Nov	20 Nov	Power Snooker Masters Trophy	Trafford Centre in Manchester, England	Martin Gould (ENG)	(Note: This format was based on points. Martin Gould won 286–258.)	Ronnie O'Sullivan (ENG)	
14 Jan	15 Jan	Dutch Open	De Dieze in 's-Hertogenbosch, Netherlands	Bjorn Haneveer (BEL)	7–3	Gerrit bij de Leij (NED)	

== Official rankings ==
=== Seeding revision 1 ===
No.	Ch.	Name	Points
1	▲	(Wales) Mark Williams	60360
2	▼	(Scotland) John Higgins	58820
3	▲	(England) Mark Selby	55965
4	▲	(China) Ding Junhui	55960
5	▼	(Australia) Neil Robertson	48100
6	▲	(England) Ali Carter	47040
7	Steady	(England) Shaun Murphy	46965
8	▼	(Scotland) Stephen Maguire	45300
9	▲	(England) Judd Trump	41715
10	▼	(Scotland) Graeme Dott	40930
11	▼	(England) Ronnie O'Sullivan	40660
12	▼	(Northern Ireland) Mark Allen	37305
13	▼	(England) Peter Ebdon	36480
14	▲	(Wales) Matthew Stevens	36395
15	▼	(England) Jamie Cope	35580
16	▼	(Scotland) Stephen Hendry	35420

=== Seeding revision 2 ===
No.	Ch.	Name	Points
1	▲	(England) Mark Selby	67385
2	▼	(Wales) Mark Williams	63540
3	▼	(Scotland) John Higgins	57540
4	▲	(Australia) Neil Robertson	52100
5	▼	(China) Ding Junhui	51420
6	▲	(England) Shaun Murphy	50485
7	▼	(England) Ali Carter	46760
8	▲	(England) Judd Trump	46465
9	▼	(Scotland) Stephen Maguire	45980
10	Steady	(Scotland) Graeme Dott	44405
11	▲	(England) Stuart Bingham	40955
12	Steady	(Northern Ireland) Mark Allen	39625
13	▲	(England) Stephen Lee	38750
14	▼	(England) Ronnie O'Sullivan	38660
15	▼	(Wales) Matthew Stevens	37815
16	▲	(England) Martin Gould	37210

=== Seeding revision 3 ===
No.	Ch.	Name	Points
1	Steady	(England) Mark Selby	69945
2	Steady	(Wales) Mark Williams	65020
3	Steady	(Scotland) John Higgins	58180
4	Steady	(Australia) Neil Robertson	57940
5	▲	(England) Judd Trump	57385
6	Steady	(England) Shaun Murphy	54085
7	▲	(Scotland) Graeme Dott	50005
8	▲	(Scotland) Stephen Maguire	49660
9	▼	(China) Ding Junhui	48740
10	▲	(Northern Ireland) Mark Allen	48265
11	▼	(England) Ali Carter	48200
12	▲	(England) Martin Gould	45370
13	▲	(Wales) Matthew Stevens	43015
14	▼	(England) Stuart Bingham	41115
15	▼	(England) Stephen Lee	40550
16	▼	(England) Ronnie O'Sullivan	40540

=== Seeding revision 4 ===
No.	Ch.	Name	Points
1	Steady	(England) Mark Selby	73945
2	Steady	(Wales) Mark Williams	66920
3	▲	(England) Judd Trump	60985
4	▲	(England) Shaun Murphy	59785
5	▼	(Australia) Neil Robertson	58640
6	▼	(Scotland) John Higgins	56980
7	▲	(China) Ding Junhui	53740
8	Steady	(Scotland) Stephen Maguire	52960
9	▼	(Scotland) Graeme Dott	50705
10	Steady	(Northern Ireland) Mark Allen	50165
11	▲	(England) Martin Gould	47520
12	▲	(England) Stephen Lee	45675
13	▼	(England) Ali Carter	45600
14	▲	(England) Ronnie O'Sullivan	45540
15	▼	(Wales) Matthew Stevens	45515
16	▼	(England) Stuart Bingham	43515

== World ranking points ==
No.	Ch	Player	Season (Note: The 2009/2010 points only included the points that counted towards the next seedings update. See for the points accumulated during the 2009/2010 and 2010/2011 seasons.)		Tournament (Note: See for ranking points accumulated up to the Players Tour Championship Finals and for points accumulated at the China Open and World Snooker Championship.)									Season	Cut-off point (Note: See for the rankings at the first seedings cut-off point; see for the second, see for the third and see at the end of the season.)			Total
No.	Ch	Player	09/10	10/11	PTC	AO	SM	UK	GM	WEO	WOO	CO	WC	11/12	1	2	3	Total
1	▲2	(England) Mark Selby	0	38445	8900	2500	7000	3040	2500	4000	4480	2660	1400	36480	67385	69945	73945	74925
2	▲7	(England) Judd Trump	0	33355	10980	700	980	8000	2500	2500	2660	3500	3800	35620	46465	57385	60985	68975
3	▼2	(Wales) Mark Williams	0	36880	2200	4000	5600	3040	2500	1900	980	2660	3800	26680	63540	65020	66920	63560
4	▲4	(Scotland) Stephen Maguire	0	26880	9360	700	980	4000	4000	2500	980	5600	6400	34520	45980	49660	52960	61400
5	▼3	(Scotland) John Higgins	0	32000	8320	700	3500	3040	1900	1900	3500	2660	3800	29320	57540	58180	56980	61320
6	▲1	(England) Shaun Murphy	0	31785	4920	3200	3500	4000	3200	3200	3500	980	1400	27900	50485	54085	59785	59685
7	▼2	(Australia) Neil Robertson	0	22520	11760	1900	4480	5120	1900	700	2660	3500	5000	37020	52100	57940	58640	59540
8	▲10	(England) Stephen Lee	0	24435	11280	575	1960	1120	3200	2500	5600	4480	1400	32115	38750	40550	45675	56550
9	▲2	(England) Ronnie O'Sullivan	0	16700	8960	0	2660	3040	5000	3200	0	3500	10000	36360	38660	40540	45540	53060
10	▲4	(Wales) Matthew Stevens	0	25680	7080	700	3500	3040	2500	1900	980	980	6400	27080	37815	43015	45515	52760
11	▼7	(China) Ding Junhui	0	28760	5340	700	980	4000	700	5000	980	4480	1400	23580	51420	48740	53740	52340
12	Steady	(Northern Ireland) Mark Allen	0	19725	5000	2500	2660	6400	1900	2500	7000	980	1400	30340	39625	48265	50165	50065
13	▼3	(Scotland) Graeme Dott	0	24065	10500	700	980	3040	1900	700	3500	2660	1400	25380	44405	50005	50705	49445
14	▲7	(England) Martin Gould	0	25110	9120	1400	2660	3040	700	1900	980	980	1400	22180	37210	45370	47520	47290
15	▲5	(England) Ricky Walden	0	23220	8980	575	805	5120	1900	575	1960	2660	1150	23725	32810	39730	41630	46945
16	▲1	(England) Stuart Bingham	0	24260	4720	5000	2660	1120	1900	1900	980	2660	1400	22340	40955	41115	43515	46600

== Points distribution ==
2011/2012 Points distribution for world ranking and minor-ranking events

Tournament	Round →	R96	R80	R64	R48	R32	R24	R16	QF	SF	F	W
Australian Goldfields Open	Unseeded loser	400	650	900	1150	1400	–	1900	2500	3200	4000	5000
Australian Goldfields Open	Seeded loser	200	325	450	575	700	–	–	–	–	–	–
Shanghai Masters	Unseeded loser	560	910	1260	1610	1960	–	2660	3500	4480	5600	7000
Shanghai Masters	Seeded loser	280	455	630	805	980	–	–	–	–	–	–
UK Championship	Unseeded loser	640	1040	1440	1840	2240	–	3040	4000	5120	6400	8000
UK Championship	Seeded loser	320	520	720	920	1120	–	–	–	–	–	–
German Masters	Unseeded loser	650	–	900	1150	1400	–	1900	2500	3200	4000	5000
German Masters	Seeded loser	325	–	450	575	700	–	–	–	–	–	–
Welsh Open	Unseeded loser	400	650	900	1150	1400	–	1900	2500	3200	4000	5000
Welsh Open	Seeded loser	200	325	450	575	700	–	–	–	–	–	–
World Open	Unseeded loser	560	910	1260	1610	1960	–	2660	3500	4480	5600	7000
World Open	Seeded loser	280	455	630	805	980	–	–	–	–	–	–
Players Tour Championship	Regular events	–	–	360	–	560	–	760	1000	1280	1600	2000
Players Tour Championship	Finals	–	–	–	–	–	840	1140	1500	1920	2400	3000
China Open	Unseeded loser	560	910	1260	1610	1960	–	2660	3500	4480	5600	7000
China Open	Seeded loser	280	455	630	805	980	–	–	–	–	–	–
World Championship	Unseeded loser	800	1300	1800	2300	2800	–	3800	5000	6400	8000	10000
World Championship	Seeded loser	400	650	900	1150	1400	–	–	–	–	–	–
