= Princess Hotel Sofia =

General information
- Type: Hotel
- Location: Sofia, Bulgaria
- Coordinates: 42°42′31″N 23°19′19″E
- Completed: 1977

Height
- Roof: 74 m (243 ft)

Technical details
- Floor count: 17

The Princess Hotel Sofia is a 4-star hotel in Sofia, Bulgaria. It has 601 hotel rooms, a luxury lobby bar and a restaurant. The hotel is located near the Central Bus Station and the Central Railway Station

== See also ==
- List of tallest buildings in Sofia
