= South West Snooker Academy =

Sports venue in Gloucester, England

Coordinates: 51°48′55.8″N 2°16′22.5″W

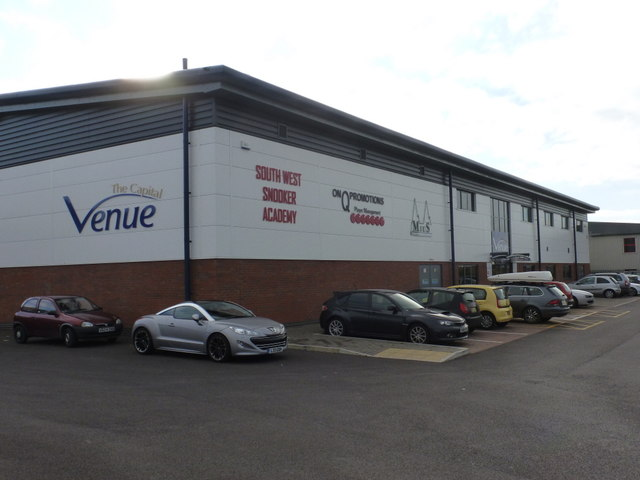
South West Snooker Academy

The South West Snooker Academy (or the Capital Venue) is located in Gloucester Business Park. It was purposely built for snooker in July 2010 but is now home to the owner Paul Mount's business MIUS.

== History ==
The South West Snooker Academy opened in 2010, with an exhibition match between Jimmy White and Tony Drago, both players who were managed by the Academy's owner Paul Mount. The venue had thirteen full-size snooker tables, a match arena with over 300 tiered seats, and a commentary box. Between the years of 2010 and 2013 the academy hosted World Snooker events such as the UK Players Tour Championship Events and World Ranking Qualifiers. But due to poor support and expenses in the summer of 2014 the layout of the building changed moving all tables upstairs in one match area and removing the arena replacing the entire downstairs with offices for MIUS.

Professionals still practicing there included Robert Milkins, Michael Wasley and Daniel Wells. The venue hosted annual tournaments such as the Pink Ribbon Pro-Am & MIUS Cup (European Under 18's Championship).

In 2019 the closure of the academy was announced.

== See also ==
- Pink Ribbon (snooker)
