= Players Tour Championship 2012/2013 – Event 2 =

Players Tour Championship 2012/2013 Event 2
Tournament information
- Dates: 8–12 August 2012
- Venue: South West Snooker Academy
- City: Gloucester
- Country: England
- Organisation: World Snooker
- Format: Minor-ranking event
- Total prize fund: £50,000
- Winner's share: £10,000
- Highest break: Rod Lawler (ENG) (142); Neil Robertson (AUS) (142)

Final
- Champion: Martin Gould (ENG)
- Runner-up: Stephen Maguire (SCO)
- Score: 4–3

The Players Tour Championship 2012/2013 – Event 2 was a professional minor-ranking snooker tournament that took place between 8–12 August 2012 at the South West Snooker Academy in Gloucester, England.

Martin Gould won his first tournament carrying ranking points by defeating Stephen Maguire 4–3 in the final.

== Prize fund and ranking points ==
The breakdown of prize money and ranking points of the event is shown below:

	Prize fund	Ranking points^{1}
Winner	£10,000	2,000
Runner-up	£5,000	1,600
Semi-finalist	£2,500	1,280
Quarter-finalist	£1,500	1,000
Last 16	£1,000	760
Last 32	£600	560
Last 64	£200	360
Total	£50,000	–

- ^{1} Only professional players can earn ranking points.

== Main draw ==
=== Preliminary rounds ===
==== Round 1 ====
Best of 7 frames

(England) Darrell Whitworth	4–1	(England) William Lemons
(Wales) Gavin Lewis	0–4	(England) Adam Wicheard
(England) Chris Norbury	4–2	(England) Thomas Wealthy
(England) Harvey Chandler	0–4	(Wales) Duane Jones
(England) Henry Roper	2–4	(England) Saqib Nasir
(Isle of Man) Darryl Hill	4–1	(England) Hassan Miah
(England) Oliver Lines	4–0	(China) Long Wang
(England) Liam Monk	4–0	(England) Joshua Wilshaw
(Scotland) Dylan Craig	4–3	(England) James Hill
(England) Jeff Cundy	2–4	(England) Kyren Wilson
(England) John Astley	4–0	(England) Tom Maxfield
(Scotland) Lloyd Condron	3–4	(England) Gareth Green
(England) Ashley Carty	4–2	(England) Mitchell Mann
(England) Ben Fortey	3–4	(Wales) Alex Taubman
(England) Justin Astley	4–3	(England) James Cahill
(Scotland) Marc Davis	4–0	(England) Stuart Carrington

(England) Lee Page	w/o–w/d	(Wales) Callum Lloyd
(India) Lucky Vatnani	4–0	(England) Anthony Harris
(England) David Lilley	2–4	(England) Ben Harrison
(England) Callum Downing	4–2	(England) Mitchell Travis
(England) Jamie Gibson	0–4	(England) Shane Castle
(England) Greg Davis	4–0	(England) Bhavesh Sodha
(England) Steven Hallworth	4–2	(England) Andy Neck
(England) Andrew Milliard	1–4	(England) James Gillespie
(Scotland) Eden Sharav	4–3	(England) Ricky Norris
(England) Jay Bullen	1–4	(England) Oliver Brown
(England) Adrian Gunnell	4–1	(England) Paul McHugh
(England) Lewis Mayes	w/d–w/o	(Wales) Jamie Clarke
(Northern Ireland) Joe Swail	4–1	(England) Sanderson Lam
(England) Matthew Day	4–0	(Wales) Edward Topham
(England) Phil O'Kane	4–1	(Brazil) Itaro Santos

==== Round 2 ====
Best of 7 frames

(England) Reanne Evans	4–3	(England) Darrell Whitworth
(England) Elliot Slessor	0–4	(England) Adam Wicheard
(England) Christopher Keogan	3–4	(England) Chris Norbury
(England) Richard Remelie	2–4	(Wales) Duane Jones
(England) Jake Nicholson	2–4	(England) Saqib Nasir
(England) Ian Brumby	4–3	(Isle of Man) Darryl Hill
(England) Nico Elton	1–4	(England) Oliver Lines
(England) Charon Parker	0–4	(England) Liam Monk
(England) Sachin Plaha	0–4	(Scotland) Dylan Craig
(Belgium) Hans Blanckaert	1–4	(England) Kyren Wilson
(Wales) Kishan Hirani	1–4	(England) John Astley
(England) Wayne Townsend	4–0	(England) Gareth Green
(England) Michael Wild	4–1	(England) Ashley Carty
(Scotland) Fraser Patrick	4–0	(Wales) Alex Taubman
(England) Samuel Thistlewhite	4–3	(England) Justin Astley

(Scotland) Ross Higgins	1–4	(Scotland) Marc Davis
(England) Ian Glover	4–1	(England) Lee Page
(India) Lucky Vatnani	0–4	(England) Ben Harrison
(England) Zak Surety	0–4	(England) Callum Downing
(England) Darren Bond	2–4	(England) Shane Castle
(Scotland) Rhys Clark	4–0	(England) Greg Davis
(England) Andy Marriott	4–2	(England) Steven Hallworth
(England) Daniel Ward	4–1	(England) James Gillespie
(Pakistan) Omer Butt	0–4	(Scotland) Eden Sharav
(England) Brandon Sargeant	0–4	(England) Oliver Brown
(England) Toby Simpson	0–4	(England) Adrian Gunnell
(Wales) Jack Bradford	0–4	(Wales) Jamie Clarke
(Republic of Ireland) Dessie Sheehan	0–4	(Northern Ireland) Joe Swail
(England) James Gibson	1–4	(England) Matthew Day
(Portugal) Francisco Domingues	0–4	(England) Phil O'Kane

=== Main rounds ===
==== Top half ====
===== Section 1 =====
Last 128; Best of 7 frames
(Scotland) Stephen Maguire	4
(Scotland) Graeme Dott	3
(England) Ali Carter	4
(India) Aditya Mehta	1
(England) Robbie Williams	4
(England) Martin O'Donnell	3
(England) Paul Davison	4
(England) Reanne Evans	1
(England) Anthony Hamilton	4
(England) Adam Wicheard	0
(China) Cao Yupeng	4
(England) Chris Norbury	0
(England) Gary Wilson	2
(England) Michael Wasley	4
(England) Shaun Murphy	4
(England) Jamie O'Neill	0

Last 64; Best of 7 frames
(Scotland) Stephen Maguire	4
(England) Ali Carter	2
(England) Robbie Williams	3
(England) Paul Davison	4
(England) Anthony Hamilton	1
(China) Cao Yupeng	4
(England) Michael Wasley	3
(England) Shaun Murphy	4

Last 32; Best of 7 frames
(Scotland) Stephen Maguire	4
(England) Paul Davison	1
(China) Cao Yupeng	2
(England) Shaun Murphy	4

Last 16; Best of 7 frames
(Scotland) Stephen Maguire	4
(England) Shaun Murphy	3

===== Section 2 =====
Last 128; Best of 7 frames
(England) Ian Burns	4
(Wales) Duane Jones	2
(England) Ricky Walden	4
(Northern Ireland) Gerard Greene	3
(China) Xiao Guodong	4
(England) Saqib Nasir	2
(India) Pankaj Advani	4
(England) Sean O'Sullivan	2
(England) Andrew Norman	0
(Norway) Kurt Maflin	4
(England) Jimmy White	4
(England) Ian Brumby	2
(Scotland) Alan McManus	4
(England) Oliver Lines	1
(England) Peter Lines	4
(England) Liam Monk	3

Last 64; Best of 7 frames
(England) Ian Burns	4
(England) Ricky Walden	0
(China) Xiao Guodong	3
(India) Pankaj Advani	4
(Norway) Kurt Maflin	2
(England) Jimmy White	4
(Scotland) Alan McManus	4
(England) Peter Lines	3

Last 32; Best of 7 frames
(England) Ian Burns	3
(India) Pankaj Advani	4
(England) Jimmy White	1
(Scotland) Alan McManus	4

Last 16; Best of 7 frames
(India) Pankaj Advani	0
(Scotland) Alan McManus	4

===== Section 3 =====
Last 128; Best of 7 frames
(England) Jimmy Robertson	4
(Wales) Jamie Jones	3
(England) Joe Perry	4
(Scotland) Michael Leslie	1
(England) David Grace	4
(Scotland) Dylan Craig	1
(China) Liu Chuang	4
(England) Kyren Wilson	3
(Scotland) Jamie Burnett	4
(Australia) Ben Judge	1
(England) Joel Walker	3
(England) John Astley	4
(Thailand) Thanawat Thirapongpaiboon	4
(England) Wayne Townsend	0
(Wales) Michael White	4
(China) Chen Zhe	0

Last 64; Best of 7 frames
(England) Jimmy Robertson	2
(England) Joe Perry	4
(England) David Grace	3
(China) Liu Chuang	4
(Scotland) Jamie Burnett	4
(England) John Astley	3
(Thailand) Thanawat Thirapongpaiboon	2
(Wales) Michael White	4

Last 32; Best of 7 frames
(England) Joe Perry	4
(China) Liu Chuang	2
(Scotland) Jamie Burnett	1
(Wales) Michael White	4

Last 16; Best of 7 frames
(England) Joe Perry	4
(Wales) Michael White	3

===== Section 4 =====
Last 128; Best of 7 frames
(England) Rory McLeod	4
(Wales) Daniel Wells	0
(China) Yu Delu	4
(England) Michael Wild	3
(England) Mark Selby	4
(Thailand) Thepchaiya Un-Nooh	1
(England) Steve Davis	3
(England) Nigel Bond	4
(England) Sydney Wilson	3
(Hong Kong) Marco Fu	4
(Scotland) Scott Donaldson	4
(Scotland) Fraser Patrick	2
(Wales) Mark Williams	4
(England) Samuel Thistlewhite	0
(Thailand) Dechawat Poomjaeng	0
(England) Barry Pinches	4

Last 64; Best of 7 frames
(England) Rory McLeod	1
(China) Yu Delu	4
(England) Mark Selby	2
(England) Nigel Bond	4
(Hong Kong) Marco Fu	4
(Scotland) Scott Donaldson	1
(Wales) Mark Williams	4
(England) Barry Pinches	1

Last 32; Best of 7 frames
(China) Yu Delu	2
(England) Nigel Bond	4
(Hong Kong) Marco Fu	1
(Wales) Mark Williams	4

Last 16; Best of 7 frames
(England) Nigel Bond	0
(Wales) Mark Williams	4

==== Bottom half ====
===== Section 5 =====
Last 128; Best of 7 frames
(England) Andrew Higginson	2
(England) Alfie Burden	4
(Thailand) James Wattana	4
(Scotland) Marc Davis	1
(England) Barry Hawkins	4
(England) Ian Glover	3
(Scotland) John Higgins	4
(England) Ben Harrison	1
(Wales) Gareth Allen	3
(England) Callum Downing	4
(England) Stuart Bingham	w/o
(Egypt) Mohamed Khairy	w/d
(England) Craig Steadman	3
(England) Liam Highfield	4
(England) Robert Milkins	4
(England) Shane Castle	1

Last 64; Best of 7 frames
(England) Alfie Burden	4
(Thailand) James Wattana	0
(England) Barry Hawkins	4
(Scotland) John Higgins	2
(England) Callum Downing	4
(England) Stuart Bingham	2
(England) Liam Highfield	0
(England) Robert Milkins	4

Last 32; Best of 7 frames
(England) Alfie Burden	4
(England) Barry Hawkins	3
(England) Callum Downing	0
(England) Robert Milkins	4

Last 16; Best of 7 frames
(England) Alfie Burden	4
(England) Robert Milkins	1

===== Section 6 =====
Last 128; Best of 7 frames
(England) Ryan Causton	0
(England) Mark King	4
(England) Judd Trump	4
(Scotland) Rhys Clark	1
(Wales) Jak Jones	4
(England) Mike Dunn	2
(England) Dave Harold	2
(Malta) Tony Drago	4
(Scotland) Anthony McGill	4
(England) Andy Marriott	1
(Wales) Ryan Day	4
(England) Daniel Ward	1
(England) Sam Baird	4
(Scotland) Eden Sharav	1
(England) Mark Joyce	4
(China) Zhang Anda	2

Last 64; Best of 7 frames
(England) Mark King	3
(England) Judd Trump	4
(Wales) Jak Jones	1
(Malta) Tony Drago	4
(Scotland) Anthony McGill	3
(Wales) Ryan Day	4
(England) Sam Baird	1
(England) Mark Joyce	4

Last 32; Best of 7 frames
(England) Judd Trump	4
(Malta) Tony Drago	1
(Wales) Ryan Day	4
(England) Mark Joyce	2

Last 16; Best of 7 frames
(England) Judd Trump	2
(Wales) Ryan Day	4

===== Section 7 =====
Last 128; Best of 7 frames
(China) Li Yan	4
(England) Adam Duffy	0
(Wales) Andrew Pagett	2
(England) Simon Bedford	4
(England) Ben Woollaston	4
(England) Mark Davis	0
(Scotland) Marcus Campbell	4
(Thailand) Passakorn Suwannawat	1
(China) Liang Wenbo	4
(England) Oliver Brown	3
(Republic of Ireland) Fergal O'Brien	4
(England) Adrian Gunnell	0
(Wales) Matthew Stevens	w/o
(Iran) Hossein Vafaei	w/d
(Belgium) Luca Brecel	2
(England) Matthew Selt	4

Last 64; Best of 7 frames
(China) Li Yan	2
(England) Simon Bedford	4
(England) Ben Woollaston	4
(Scotland) Marcus Campbell	2
(China) Liang Wenbo	4
(Republic of Ireland) Fergal O'Brien	0
(Wales) Matthew Stevens	4
(England) Matthew Selt	3

Last 32; Best of 7 frames
(England) Simon Bedford	0
(England) Ben Woollaston	4
(China) Liang Wenbo	4
(Wales) Matthew Stevens	2

Last 16; Best of 7 frames
(England) Ben Woollaston	4
(China) Liang Wenbo	1

===== Section 8 =====
Last 128; Best of 7 frames
(Australia) Neil Robertson	4
(Wales) Jamie Clarke	0
(England) Andy Hicks	0
(England) David Gilbert	4
(England) Michael Holt	w/d
(England) Martin Gould	w/o
(England) Jamie Cope	4
(China) Tian Pengfei	2
(England) Rod Lawler	4
(Northern Ireland) Joe Swail	1
(Wales) Dominic Dale	3
(England) Matthew Day	4
(Northern Ireland) Mark Allen	4
(England) Phil O'Kane	0
(England) Jack Lisowski	1
(England) Tom Ford	4

Last 64; Best of 7 frames
(Australia) Neil Robertson	4
(England) David Gilbert	0
(England) Martin Gould	4
(England) Jamie Cope	3
(England) Rod Lawler	4
(England) Matthew Day	0
(Northern Ireland) Mark Allen	4
(England) Tom Ford	3

Last 32; Best of 7 frames
(Australia) Neil Robertson	0
(England) Martin Gould	4
(England) Rod Lawler	1
(Northern Ireland) Mark Allen	4

Last 16; Best of 7 frames
(England) Martin Gould	4
(Northern Ireland) Mark Allen	3

==== Finals ====
Quarter-finals; Best of 7 frames		Semi-finals; Best of 7 frames		Final; Best of 7 frames
(Scotland) Stephen Maguire	4
(Scotland) Alan McManus	1	(Scotland) Stephen Maguire	4
(England) Joe Perry	4	(England) Joe Perry	3
(Wales) Mark Williams	1			(Scotland) Stephen Maguire	3
(England) Alfie Burden	4			(England) Martin Gould	4
(Wales) Ryan Day	3	(England) Alfie Burden	1
(England) Ben Woollaston	2	(England) Martin Gould	4
(England) Martin Gould	4

== Century breaks ==
- 142, 118 – Rod Lawler
- 142 – Neil Robertson
- 141, 127 – Alfie Burden
- 140, 132 – Fergal O'Brien
- 140, 100 – Judd Trump
- 140 – Martin O'Donnell
- 140 – Jamie Burnett
- 139, 106 – Marco Fu
- 134, 113, 104 – Martin Gould
- 134 – Xiao Guodong
- 130, 116 – Mark Williams
- 130, 114 – Liang Wenbo
- 129, 123, 114 – Stephen Maguire
- 126, 121 – Joe Perry
- 126 – Shaun Murphy
- 122, 101 – Mark King
- 118 – Paul Davison
- 114 – Tom Ford
- 114 – Simon Bedford
- 109 – Barry Hawkins
- 108, 102 – Mark Allen
- 106 – Kyren Wilson
- 104 – Jimmy Robertson
- 104 – Ben Woollaston
- 103, 102 – Peter Lines
- 100 – Robbie Williams
