= 2014 Champion of Champions =

2014 Dafabet Champion of Champions

Tournament information
- Dates: 3–9 November 2014
- Venue: Ricoh Arena
- City: Coventry
- Country: England
- Organisation: Matchroom Sport
- Format: Non-ranking event
- Total prize fund: £270,000
- Winner's share: £100,000
- Highest break: Ronnie O'Sullivan (ENG) (139)

Final
- Champion: Ronnie O'Sullivan (ENG)
- Runner-up: Judd Trump (ENG)
- Score: 10–7

The 2014 Champion of Champions (officially the 2014 Dafabet Champion of Champions) was a professional non-ranking snooker tournament that took place between 3 and 9 November 2014 at the Ricoh Arena in Coventry, England.

Ronnie O'Sullivan successfully defended his title beating Judd Trump 10–7 in the final.

== Prize fund ==
The breakdown of prize money for this year is shown below:

- Winner: £100,000
- Runner-up: £50,000
- Semi-finals: £20,000
- Group runner-up: £10,000
- Group semi-finals: £5,000
- Total: £270,000

== Players ==
Players qualified for the event by winning important tournaments since the previous Champion of Champions. Entry was guaranteed for the defending champion, winners of rankings events and winners of the following non-rankings events: 2014 Masters and 2014 Championship League. Remaining places were then allocated to winners of European Tour events (in the order they were played) and then to winners of Asian Tour events and then, winners of the 2014 Six-red World Championship, 2014 Snooker Shoot-Out and 2013 World Seniors Championship.

Only 13 different players won one the 24 qualifying tournaments. The remaining three places were allocated to the three highest ranked players who had not already qualified, based on the world rankings after the 2014 Bulgarian Open.

The following 16 players qualified for the tournament:

Seed	Player	Qualified as	Ref.
1	(England) Ronnie O'Sullivan	Winner of 2013 Champion of Champions, 2014 Masters and 2014 Welsh Open	
2	(England) Mark Selby	Winner of 2014 World Snooker Championship and 2014 Riga Open	
3	(Australia) Neil Robertson	Winner of 2013 UK Championship and 2014 Wuxi Classic	
4	(China) Ding Junhui	Winner of 2014 German Masters, 2014 China Open and 2014 Yixing Open	
	(England) Judd Trump	Winner of 2014 Championship League and 2014 Australian Goldfields Open	
	(England) Shaun Murphy	Winner of 2014 Gdynia Open, 2014 World Open and 2014 Bulgarian Open	
	(England) Barry Hawkins	Winner of 2014 Players Championship Grand Final	
	(England) Stuart Bingham	Winner of 2014 Dongguan Open, 2014 Shanghai Masters and 2014 Haining Open	
	(England) Ricky Walden	Winner of 2014 International Championship	
	(Northern Ireland) Mark Allen	Winner of 2014 Paul Hunter Classic	
	(Scotland) Stephen Maguire	Winner of 2014 Six-red World Championship	
	(Wales) Dominic Dale	Winner of 2014 Snooker Shoot-Out	
	(England) Steve Davis	Winner of 2013 World Seniors Championship	
	(Hong Kong) Marco Fu	World ranking of 9	
	(Scotland) John Higgins	World ranking of 12	
	(England) Ali Carter	World ranking of 13 (Note: Due to his absence for medical reasons from all World Snooker Tour events until this tournament in the 2014/2015 season, Ali Carter's seeding position will be determined as if he would be ranked 13th.)	

== Main draw ==
Group semi-finals (last 16); Best of 7 frames
1	(England) Ronnie O'Sullivan	4
(England) Stuart Bingham	2
Group 1 (5 November)
(England) Shaun Murphy	1
(Hong Kong) Marco Fu	4
(England) Barry Hawkins	4
(Scotland) John Higgins	1
Group 4 (3 November)
4	(China) Ding Junhui	4
(Wales) Dominic Dale	2
3	(Australia) Neil Robertson	4
(England) Ali Carter	0
Group 3 (7 November)
(England) Ricky Walden	4
(Northern Ireland) Mark Allen	0
(England) Judd Trump	4
(Scotland) Stephen Maguire	1
Group 2 (4 November)
2	(England) Mark Selby	4
(England) Steve Davis	1

Group finals (quarter-finals); Best of 11 frames
1	(England) Ronnie O'Sullivan	6
(Hong Kong) Marco Fu	0
(England) Barry Hawkins	5
4	(China) Ding Junhui	6
3	(Australia) Neil Robertson	6
(England) Ricky Walden	3
(England) Judd Trump	6
2	(England) Mark Selby	1

Semi-finals; Best of 11 frames
1	(England) Ronnie O'Sullivan	6
4	(China) Ding Junhui	4
3	(Australia) Neil Robertson	4
(England) Judd Trump	6

Final; Best of 19 frames
1	(England) Ronnie O'Sullivan	10
(England) Judd Trump	7

== Final ==
Final: Best of 19 frames. Referee: Brendan Moore. Ricoh Arena, Coventry, England, 9 November 2014.
Ronnie O'Sullivan (1); England	10–7	Judd Trump; England
Afternoon: 137–0 (137), 82–0 (78), 25–100, 63–73, 137–0 (50, 87), 80–0 (80), 34–89 (58), 139–0 (139), 134–0 (134); Evening: 70–61 (70, 56), 114–23 (70), 9–113 (102), 0–100 (100), 0–70 (69), 0–90 (90), 82–46 (63), 109–0 (109)
139	Highest break	102
4	Century breaks	2
11	50+ breaks	6

== Century breaks ==
- 139, 137, 134, 125, 115, 109, 105, 103 – Ronnie O'Sullivan
- 134, 117, 111, 106 – Neil Robertson
- 119, 106, 102, 100 – Judd Trump
- 112 – Barry Hawkins
- 111, 105 – Ding Junhui
- 107 – Stuart Bingham
