= 1995 Thailand Open =

Thailand Open
Tournament information
- Dates: 10–18 March 1995
- Venue: Imperial Queens Park Hotel
- City: Bangkok
- Country: Thailand
- Organisation: WPBSA
- Format: Ranking event

Final
- Champion: James Wattana (THA)
- Runner-up: Ronnie O'Sullivan (ENG)
- Score: 9–6

The 1995 Kloster Thailand Open was a professional ranking snooker tournament that took place between 10 and 18 March 1995 at the Montien Riverside Hotel in Bangkok, Thailand.

James Wattana won the tournament and defended his title from the previous season by defeating Ronnie O'Sullivan 9–6 in the final.

== Wildcard round ==
Match		Score	
WC1	Wayne Brown (ENG)	5–4	Ooi Chin Kay (MAS)
WC2	Phaitoon Phonbun (THA)	5–2	Anthony Davies (WAL)
WC3	Sakchai Sim Ngam (THA)	w/o–w/d	Roger Garrett (ENG)
WC4	Jason Wallace (ENG)	5–2	Anurat Wongjan (THA)

== Main draw ==
Last 32; Best of 9 frames
(Thailand) James Wattana	5
(England) Wayne Brown	1
(England) Willie Thorne	5
(England) Jason Wallace	2
(England) Gary Wilkinson	5
(Wales) Terry Griffiths	3
(Scotland) Alan McManus	5
(England) Mick Price	3
(Wales) Darren Morgan	5
(Thailand) Sakchai Sim Ngam	4
(England) Nigel Bond	5
(England) Tony Knowles	3
(England) David Roe	5
(Wales) Tony Chappel	4
(England) Mark Johnston-Allen	5
(England) Jimmy White	4
(England) Steve Davis	5
(Thailand) Phaitoon Phonbun	1
(Canada) Cliff Thorburn	5
(Northern Ireland) Joe Swail	4
(Malta) Tony Drago	5
(Northern Ireland) Dennis Taylor	4
(England) John Parrott	5
(Canada) Alain Robidoux	2
(Republic of Ireland) Ken Doherty	5
(England) Jason Ferguson	4
(England) Peter Ebdon	5
(Scotland) John Higgins	2
(England) Ronnie O'Sullivan	5
(Wales) Doug Mountjoy	3
(Scotland) Stephen Hendry	5
(Wales) Mark Williams	4

Last 16; Best of 9 frames
(Thailand) James Wattana	5
(England) Willie Thorne	4
(England) Gary Wilkinson	5
(Scotland) Alan McManus	4
(Wales) Darren Morgan	5
(England) Nigel Bond	1
(England) David Roe	3
(England) Mark Johnston-Allen	5
(England) Steve Davis	2
(Canada) Cliff Thorburn	5
(Malta) Tony Drago	5
(England) John Parrott	1
(Republic of Ireland) Ken Doherty	2
(England) Peter Ebdon	5
(England) Ronnie O'Sullivan	5
(Scotland) Stephen Hendry	2

Quarter-finals; Best of 9 frames
(Thailand) James Wattana	5
(England) Gary Wilkinson	0
(Wales) Darren Morgan	4
(England) Mark Johnston-Allen	5
(Canada) Cliff Thorburn	5
(Malta) Tony Drago	4
(England) Peter Ebdon	1
(England) Ronnie O'Sullivan	5

Semi-finals; Best of 9 frames
(Thailand) James Wattana	5
(England) Mark Johnston-Allen	1
(Canada) Cliff Thorburn	0
(England) Ronnie O'Sullivan	5

Final; Best of 17 frames
(Thailand) James Wattana	9
(England) Ronnie O'Sullivan	6
