= 2014 Championship League =

Championship League

Tournament information
- Dates: 6 January – 6 March 2014
- Venue: Crondon Park Golf Club
- City: Stock
- Country: England
- Organisation: Matchroom Sport
- Format: Non-ranking event
- Total prize fund: £179,500
- Winner's share: £10,000 (plus bonuses)
- Highest break: Shaun Murphy (ENG) (147)

Final
- Champion: Judd Trump (ENG)
- Runner-up: Martin Gould (ENG)
- Score: 3–1

The 2014 Championship League was a professional non-ranking snooker tournament that was played from 6 January to 6 March 2014 at the Crondon Park Golf Club in Stock, England.

Shaun Murphy made the 103rd official maximum break during his league stage match against Mark Davis in group two. This was Murphy's second official 147 break and the sixth in the 2013/2014 season. It was also the first maximum break in the history of the tournament. During the same day Neil Robertson defeated Joe Perry 3–0. During the match he made three century breaks, which took the number of his century breaks in the season to 63, breaking the record of most centuries compiled in a single season previously held by Judd Trump, who compiled 61 in the previous season. In all Robertson made 22 century breaks in this year's Championship League; a substantial contribution to his record-breaking 103 century break season.

Judd Trump won his second Championship League title by defeating defending champion Martin Gould 3–1 in the final, and earned a place at the 2014 Champion of Champions.

== Prize fund ==
The breakdown of prize money for this year is shown below:

- Group 1–7
  - Winner: £3,000
  - Runner-up: £2,000
  - Semi-final: £1,000
  - Frame-win (league stage): £100
  - Frame-win (play-offs): £300
  - Highest break: £500
- Winners' group
  - Winner: £10,000
  - Runner-up: £5,000
  - Semi-final: £3,000
  - Frame-win (league stage): £200
  - Frame-win (play-offs): £300
  - Highest break: £1,000
- Tournament total: £179,500

== Group one ==
Group one was played on 6 and 7 January 2014. Ricky Walden was the first player to qualify for the winners group.

=== Matches ===
- Judd Trump 3–1 Shaun Murphy
- Stuart Bingham 2–3 Ricky Walden
- Mark Davis 3–1 Robert Milkins
- Ali Carter 3–0 Judd Trump
- Shaun Murphy 3–2 Stuart Bingham
- Ricky Walden 3–1 Mark Davis
- Robert Milkins 0–3 Ali Carter
- Judd Trump 3–1 Stuart Bingham
- Shaun Murphy 3–2 Ricky Walden
- Mark Davis 3–1 Ali Carter
- Stuart Bingham 2–3 Ali Carter
- Robert Milkins 0–3 Ricky Walden
- Judd Trump 3–0 Robert Milkins
- Shaun Murphy 0–3 Mark Davis
- Ricky Walden 2–3 Ali Carter
- Stuart Bingham 3–1 Robert Milkins
- Shaun Murphy 1–3 Ali Carter
- Judd Trump 3–0 Mark Davis
- Stuart Bingham 1–3 Mark Davis
- Shaun Murphy 2–3 Robert Milkins
- Judd Trump 3–0 Ricky Walden

=== Table ===
Pos	Player	Pld	W	L	FF	FA	FD	
1	Ali Carter (ENG)	6	5	1	16	8	+8	Qualification to Group 1 play-off
2	Judd Trump (ENG)	6	5	1	15	5	+10	Qualification to Group 1 play-off
3	Mark Davis (ENG)	6	4	2	13	9	+4	Qualification to Group 1 play-off
4	Ricky Walden (ENG)	6	3	3	13	12	+1	Qualification to Group 1 play-off
5	Shaun Murphy (ENG)	6	2	4	10	16	−6	Advances into Group 2
6	Stuart Bingham (ENG)	6	1	5	11	16	−5	Eliminated from the competition
7	Robert Milkins (ENG)	6	1	5	5	17	−12	Eliminated from the competition

=== Play-offs ===
Semi-finals; Best of 5 frames
1	Ali Carter (ENG)	1
4	Ricky Walden (ENG)	3
2	Judd Trump (ENG)	3
3	Mark Davis (ENG)	0

Final; Best of 5 frames
4	Ricky Walden (ENG)	3
2	Judd Trump (ENG)	2

== Group two ==
Group two was played on 8 and 9 January 2014. Joe Perry was the second player to qualify for the winners group.

=== Matches ===
- Judd Trump 3–0 Ali Carter
- Mark Davis 2–3 Shaun Murphy
- Neil Robertson 3–1 Barry Hawkins
- Joe Perry 3–1 Judd Trump
- Ali Carter 3–1 Mark Davis
- Shaun Murphy 2–3 Neil Robertson
- Barry Hawkins 1–3 Joe Perry
- Judd Trump 3–1 Mark Davis
- Ali Carter 0–3 Shaun Murphy
- Neil Robertson 3–0 Joe Perry
- Mark Davis 2–3 Joe Perry
- Barry Hawkins 0–3 Shaun Murphy
- Judd Trump 3–1 Barry Hawkins
- Ali Carter 1–3 Neil Robertson
- Shaun Murphy 1–3 Joe Perry
- Mark Davis 3–0 Barry Hawkins
- Ali Carter 1–3 Joe Perry
- Judd Trump 3–1 Neil Robertson
- Mark Davis 3–0 Neil Robertson
- Ali Carter 3–1 Barry Hawkins
- Judd Trump 3–1 Shaun Murphy

=== Table ===
Pos	Player	Pld	W	L	FF	FA	FD	
1	Judd Trump (ENG)	6	5	1	16	7	+9	Qualification to Group 2 play-off
2	Joe Perry (ENG)	6	5	1	15	9	+6	Qualification to Group 2 play-off
3	Neil Robertson (AUS)	6	4	2	13	10	+3	Qualification to Group 2 play-off
4	Shaun Murphy (ENG)	6	3	3	13	11	+2	Qualification to Group 2 play-off
5	Mark Davis (ENG)	6	2	4	12	12	0	Advances into Group 3
6	Ali Carter (ENG)	6	2	4	8	14	−6	Eliminated from the competition
7	Barry Hawkins (ENG)	6	0	6	4	18	−14	Eliminated from the competition

=== Play-offs ===
Semi-finals; Best of 5 frames
1	Judd Trump (ENG)	3
4	Shaun Murphy (ENG)	1
2	Joe Perry (ENG)	3
3	Neil Robertson (AUS)	2

Final; Best of 5 frames
1	Judd Trump (ENG)	0
2	Joe Perry (ENG)	3

== Group three ==
Group three was played on 20 and 21 January 2014. Judd Trump was the third player to qualify for the winners group.

=== Matches ===
- Judd Trump 0–3 Neil Robertson
- Shaun Murphy 3–0 Mark Davis
- Graeme Dott 3–0 Matthew Stevens
- Ryan Day 1–3 Judd Trump
- Neil Robertson 3–2 Shaun Murphy
- Mark Davis 3–2 Graeme Dott
- Matthew Stevens 3–1 Ryan Day
- Judd Trump 1–3 Shaun Murphy
- Neil Robertson 3–1 Mark Davis
- Graeme Dott 2–3 Ryan Day
- Shaun Murphy 3–1 Ryan Day
- Matthew Stevens 3–2 Mark Davis
- Judd Trump 3–1 Matthew Stevens
- Neil Robertson 3–2 Graeme Dott
- Mark Davis 2–3 Ryan Day
- Shaun Murphy 3–1 Matthew Stevens
- Neil Robertson 2–3 Ryan Day
- Judd Trump 3–0 Graeme Dott
- Shaun Murphy 3–2 Graeme Dott
- Neil Robertson 2–3 Matthew Stevens
- Judd Trump 1–3 Mark Davis

=== Table ===
Pos	Player	Pld	W	L	FF	FA	FD	
1	Shaun Murphy (ENG)	6	5	1	17	8	+9	Qualification to Group 3 play-off
2	Neil Robertson (AUS)	6	4	2	16	11	+5	Qualification to Group 3 play-off
3	Ryan Day (WAL)	6	3	3	12	15	−3	Qualification to Group 3 play-off
4	Judd Trump (ENG)	6	3	3	11	11	0	Qualification to Group 3 play-off
5	Matthew Stevens (WAL)	6	3	3	11	14	−3	Advances into Group 4
6	Mark Davis (ENG)	6	2	4	11	15	−4	Eliminated from the competition
7	Graeme Dott (SCO)	6	1	5	11	15	−4	Eliminated from the competition

=== Play-offs ===
Semi-finals; Best of 5 frames
1	Shaun Murphy (ENG)	0
4	Judd Trump (ENG)	3
2	Neil Robertson (AUS)	2
3	Ryan Day (WAL)	3

Final; Best of 5 frames
4	Judd Trump (ENG)	3
3	Ryan Day (WAL)	0

== Group four ==
Group four was played on 22 and 23 January 2014. Stephen Maguire was the fourth player to qualify for the winners group.

=== Matches ===
- Ryan Day 1–3 Shaun Murphy
- Neil Robertson 3–1 Matthew Stevens
- Mark Selby 1–3 Stephen Maguire
- Tom Ford 1–3 Ryan Day
- Shaun Murphy 2–3 Neil Robertson
- Matthew Stevens 3–2 Mark Selby
- Stephen Maguire 3–1 Tom Ford
- Ryan Day 1–3 Neil Robertson
- Shaun Murphy 3–1 Matthew Stevens
- Mark Selby 3–0 Tom Ford
- Neil Robertson 2–3 Tom Ford
- Stephen Maguire 3–2 Matthew Stevens
- Ryan Day 2–3 Stephen Maguire
- Shaun Murphy 3–2 Mark Selby
- Matthew Stevens 3–2 Tom Ford
- Neil Robertson 2–3 Stephen Maguire
- Shaun Murphy 1–3 Tom Ford
- Ryan Day 3–0 Mark Selby
- Neil Robertson 1–3 Mark Selby
- Shaun Murphy 2–3 Stephen Maguire
- Ryan Day 3–1 Matthew Stevens

=== Table ===
Pos	Player	Pld	W	L	FF	FA	FD	
1	Stephen Maguire (SCO)	6	6	0	18	10	+8	Qualification to Group 4 play-off
2	Neil Robertson (AUS)	6	3	3	14	13	+1	Qualification to Group 4 play-off
3	Shaun Murphy (ENG)	6	3	3	14	13	+1	Qualification to Group 4 play-off
4	Ryan Day (WAL)	6	3	3	13	11	+2	Qualification to Group 4 play-off
5	Mark Selby (ENG)	6	2	4	11	13	−2	Advances into Group 5
6	Matthew Stevens (WAL)	6	2	4	11	16	−5	Eliminated from the competition
7	Tom Ford (ENG)	6	2	4	10	15	−5	Eliminated from the competition

=== Play-offs ===
Semi-finals; Best of 5 frames
1	Stephen Maguire (SCO)	3
4	Ryan Day (WAL)	2
2	Neil Robertson (AUS)	3
3	Shaun Murphy (ENG)	1

Final; Best of 5 frames
1	Stephen Maguire (SCO)	3
2	Neil Robertson (AUS)	0

== Group five ==
Group five was played on 10 and 11 February 2014. Shaun Murphy was the fifth player to qualify for the winners group.

=== Matches ===
- Neil Robertson 0–3 Shaun Murphy
- Ryan Day 3–0 Mark Selby
- John Higgins 1–3 Dominic Dale
- Marco Fu 3–2 Neil Robertson
- Shaun Murphy 3–1 Ryan Day
- Mark Selby 0–3 John Higgins
- Dominic Dale 1–3 Marco Fu
- Neil Robertson 3–1 Ryan Day
- Shaun Murphy 3–1 Mark Selby
- John Higgins 3–2 Marco Fu
- Ryan Day 3–2 Marco Fu
- Dominic Dale 0–3 Mark Selby
- Neil Robertson 2–3 Dominic Dale
- Shaun Murphy 3–0 John Higgins
- Mark Selby 3–2 Marco Fu
- Ryan Day 1–3 Dominic Dale
- Shaun Murphy 1–3 Marco Fu
- Neil Robertson 2–3 John Higgins
- Ryan Day 3–0 John Higgins
- Shaun Murphy 1–3 Dominic Dale
- Neil Robertson 2–3 Mark Selby

=== Table ===
Pos	Player	Pld	W	L	FF	FA	FD	
1	Shaun Murphy (ENG)	6	4	2	14	8	+6	Qualification to Group 5 play-off
2	Dominic Dale (WAL)	6	4	2	13	11	+2	Qualification to Group 5 play-off
3	Marco Fu (HKG)	6	3	3	15	13	+2	Qualification to Group 5 play-off
4	Ryan Day (WAL)	6	3	3	12	11	+1	Qualification to Group 5 play-off
5	John Higgins (SCO)	6	3	3	10	13	−3	Advances into Group 6
6	Mark Selby (ENG)	6	3	3	10	13	−3	Eliminated from the competition
7	Neil Robertson (AUS)	6	1	5	11	16	−5	Eliminated from the competition

=== Play-offs ===
Semi-finals; Best of 5 frames
1	Shaun Murphy (ENG)	3
4	Ryan Day (WAL)	0
2	Dominic Dale (WAL)	3
3	Marco Fu (HKG)	2

Final; Best of 5 frames
1	Shaun Murphy (ENG)	3
2	Dominic Dale (WAL)	1

== Group six ==
Group six was played on 12 and 13 February 2014. Martin Gould was the sixth player to qualify for the winners group.

=== Matches ===
- Dominic Dale 1–3 Marco Fu
- Ryan Day 0–3 John Higgins
- Martin Gould 1–3 Mark Williams
- Michael Holt 3–1 Dominic Dale
- Marco Fu 2–3 Ryan Day
- John Higgins 1–3 Martin Gould
- Mark Williams 3–1 Michael Holt
- Dominic Dale 0–3 Ryan Day
- Marco Fu 2–3 John Higgins
- Martin Gould 3–0 Michael Holt
- Ryan Day 3–0 Michael Holt
- Mark Williams 0–3 John Higgins
- Dominic Dale 1–3 Mark Williams
- Marco Fu 2–3 Martin Gould
- John Higgins 3–2 Michael Holt
- Ryan Day 0–3 Mark Williams
- Marco Fu 1–3 Michael Holt
- Dominic Dale 1–3 Martin Gould
- Ryan Day 1–3 Martin Gould
- Marco Fu 1–3 Mark Williams
- Dominic Dale 1–3 John Higgins

=== Table ===
Pos	Player	Pld	W	L	FF	FA	FD	
1	Martin Gould (ENG)	6	5	1	16	8	+8	Qualification to Group 6 play-off
2	John Higgins (SCO)	6	5	1	16	8	+8	Qualification to Group 6 play-off
3	Mark Williams (WAL)	6	5	1	15	7	+8	Qualification to Group 6 play-off
4	Ryan Day (WAL)	6	3	3	10	11	−1	Qualification to Group 6 play-off
5	Michael Holt (ENG)	6	2	4	9	14	−5	Advances into Group 7
6	Marco Fu (HKG)	6	1	5	11	16	−5	Eliminated from the competition
7	Dominic Dale (WAL)	6	0	6	5	18	−13	Eliminated from the competition

=== Play-offs ===
Semi-finals; Best of 5 frames
1	Martin Gould (ENG)	3
4	Ryan Day (WAL)	1
2	John Higgins (SCO)	3
3	Mark Williams (WAL)	0

Final; Best of 5 frames
1	Martin Gould (ENG)	3
2	John Higgins (SCO)	1

== Group seven ==
Group seven was played on 3 and 4 March 2014. Ryan Day was the last player to qualify for the winners group.

=== Matches ===
- John Higgins 3–0 Mark Williams
- Ryan Day 3–0 Marcus Campbell
- Peter Ebdon 3–2 Andrew Higginson
- Mark King 0–3 John Higgins
- Mark Williams 2–3 Ryan Day
- Marcus Campbell 3–2 Peter Ebdon
- Andrew Higginson 2–3 Mark King
- John Higgins 3–0 Ryan Day
- Mark Williams 0–3 Marcus Campbell
- Peter Ebdon 0–3 Mark King
- Ryan Day 3–0 Mark King
- Andrew Higginson 3–1 Marcus Campbell
- John Higgins 3–0 Andrew Higginson
- Mark Williams 0–3 Peter Ebdon
- Marcus Campbell 0–3 Mark King
- Ryan Day 3–2 Andrew Higginson
- Mark Williams 3–2 Mark King
- John Higgins 3–1 Peter Ebdon
- Ryan Day 3–1 Peter Ebdon
- Mark Williams 1–3 Andrew Higginson
- John Higgins 3–1 Marcus Campbell

=== Table ===
Pos	Player	Pld	W	L	FF	FA	FD	
1	John Higgins (SCO)	6	6	0	18	2	+16	Qualification to Group 7 play-off
2	Ryan Day (WAL)	6	5	1	15	8	+7	Qualification to Group 7 play-off
3	Mark King (ENG)	6	3	3	11	11	0	Qualification to Group 7 play-off
4	Andrew Higginson (ENG)	6	2	4	12	14	−2	Qualification to Group 7 play-off
5	Peter Ebdon (ENG)	6	2	4	10	14	−4	Eliminated from the competition
6	Marcus Campbell (SCO)	6	2	4	8	14	−6	Eliminated from the competition
7	Mark Williams (WAL)	6	1	5	6	17	−11	Eliminated from the competition

=== Play-offs ===
Semi-finals; Best of 5 frames
1	John Higgins (SCO)	1
4	Andrew Higginson (ENG)	3
2	Ryan Day (WAL)	3
3	Mark King (ENG)	1

Final; Best of 5 frames
4	Andrew Higginson (ENG)	0
2	Ryan Day (WAL)	3

== Winners' group ==
The winners' group was played on 5 and 6 March 2014. Judd Trump won his second Championship League title.

=== Matches ===
- Ricky Walden 3–1 Joe Perry
- Judd Trump 2–3 Stephen Maguire
- Shaun Murphy 2–3 Martin Gould
- Ryan Day 0–3 Ricky Walden
- Joe Perry 2–3 Judd Trump
- Stephen Maguire 1–3 Shaun Murphy
- Martin Gould 2–3 Ryan Day
- Ricky Walden 1–3 Judd Trump
- Joe Perry 1–3 Stephen Maguire
- Shaun Murphy 3–0 Ryan Day
- Judd Trump 0–3 Ryan Day
- Martin Gould 2–3 Stephen Maguire
- Ricky Walden 1–3 Martin Gould
- Joe Perry 1–3 Shaun Murphy
- Stephen Maguire 3–2 Ryan Day
- Judd Trump 3–2 Martin Gould
- Joe Perry 3–1 Ryan Day
- Ricky Walden 1–3 Shaun Murphy
- Judd Trump 2–3 Shaun Murphy
- Joe Perry 1–3 Martin Gould
- Ricky Walden 3–2 Stephen Maguire

=== Table ===
Pos	Player	Pld	W	L	FF	FA	FD	
1	Shaun Murphy (ENG)	6	5	1	17	8	+9	Qualification to Winners' Group play-off
2	Stephen Maguire (SCO)	6	4	2	15	13	+2	Qualification to Winners' Group play-off
3	Martin Gould (ENG)	6	3	3	15	13	+2	Qualification to Winners' Group play-off
4	Judd Trump (ENG)	6	3	3	13	14	−1	Qualification to Winners' Group play-off
5	Ricky Walden (ENG)	6	3	3	12	12	0	Eliminated from the competition
6	Ryan Day (WAL)	6	2	4	9	14	−5	Eliminated from the competition
7	Joe Perry (ENG)	6	1	5	9	16	−7	Eliminated from the competition

=== Play-offs ===
Semi-finals; Best of 5 frames
1	Shaun Murphy (ENG)	2
4	Judd Trump (ENG)	3
2	Stephen Maguire (SCO)	0
3	Martin Gould (ENG)	3

Final; Best of 5 frames
4	Judd Trump (ENG)	3
3	Martin Gould (ENG)	1

== Century breaks ==
Total: 93

- **147** (2), 131, 134, 128, 121, 112, 109, 107, 103, 103, 102, 101 – Shaun Murphy
- 144, **141** (4), 137, 137, 135, 134, 133, 131, 129, 128, 127, 124, 119, 118, 117, 109, 107, 104, 103, 102, 102, 101 – Neil Robertson
- **142** (1), **142** (3), 130, 119, 117, 113, 109, 108, 102, 100 – Judd Trump
- **139** (7), 137 – John Higgins
- **139** (7), 122, 104, 101 – Andrew Higginson
- **137** (5), 129, 122, 108, 105, 103, 100 – Marco Fu
- **135** (W), 132, 128 – Stephen Maguire
- 134, 131, 124, 102, 101 – Mark Davis
- 133, 102 – Ali Carter
- 131 – Tom Ford
- 130, 126, 119, 105, 106, 102 – Mark Selby
- 130, 108 – Peter Ebdon
- **128** (6), 120, 110 – Martin Gould
- 124 – Barry Hawkins
- 123, 118, 115, 107, 105, 101 – Ryan Day
- 121, 106, 106, 105 – Michael Holt
- 117 – Ricky Walden
- 103 – Joe Perry
- 101 – Stuart Bingham

Bold: highest break in the indicated group.

== Winnings ==
No.	Player	1	2	3	4	5	6	7	W	TOTAL
1	Judd Trump (ENG)	**5,500**	4,500	**6,400**					14,400	30,800
2	Shaun Murphy (ENG)	1,000	**3,100**	2,700	2,700	6,200			7,000	22,700
3	Ryan Day (WAL)			4,100	2,900	2,200	2,300	6,300	1,800	19,600
4	Martin Gould (ENG)						**6,900**		9,200	16,100
5	Stephen Maguire (SCO)				6,600				**7,000**	13,600
6	Neil Robertson (AUS)		2,900	3,200	**4,800**	1,100				12,000
7	John Higgins (SCO)					1,000	4,800	**3,350**		9,150
8	Ricky Walden (ENG)	6,100							2,400	8,500
9	Joe Perry (ENG)		6,300						1,800	8,100
10	Dominic Dale (WAL)					4,500	500			5,000
11	Marco Fu (HKG)					**3,600**	1,100			4,700
12	Mark Davis (ENG)	2,300	1,200	1,100						4,600
13	Andrew Higginson (ENG)							**4,350**		4,350
14	Ali Carter (ENG)	2,900	800							3,700
15	Mark Williams (WAL)						2,500	600		3,100
16	Mark King (ENG)							2,400		2,400
17	Matthew Stevens (WAL)			1,100	1,100					2,200
18	Mark Selby (ENG)				1,100	1,000				2,100
19	Stuart Bingham (ENG)	1,100								1,100
=	Graeme Dott (SCO)			1,100						1,100
21	Tom Ford (ENG)				1,000					1,000
=	Peter Ebdon (ENG)							1,000		1,000
23	Michael Holt (ENG)						900			900
24	Marcus Campbell (SCO)							800		800
25	Robert Milkins (ENG)	500								500
26	Barry Hawkins (ENG)		400							400
	Total prize money	19,400	19,200	19,700	20,200	19,600	19,000	18,800	43,600	179,500

Green: Won the group. Bold: Highest break in the group. All prize money in GBP.
