= 1990 Kent Cup =

Snooker tournament

Kent Cup
Tournament information
- Dates: 15–18 March 1990
- Venue: Yuetan Stadium
- City: Beijing
- Country: China
- Organisation: Pro-Tex Sports Management
- Format: Non-ranking event
- Total prize fund: US$25,000
- Winner's share: US$8,000
- Highest break: Ken Doherty (IRE), 79

Final
- Champion: Marcus Campbell (SCO)
- Runner-up: Tom Finstad (CAN)
- Score: 4–1

The 1990 Kent Cup was an invitational non-ranking snooker tournament held at the Yuetan Stadium in Beijing from 15 to 18 March 1990. Marcus Campbell won the event, defeating Tom Finstad 4–1 in the final. The tournament was promoted by Pro-Tex Sports Management, a Hong Kong company, working with the China Billiards and Snooker Association.

There were four groups of three players, with each group played on a round-robin, and the winner from each group progressing to the semifinals. The group matches were decided on the aggregate score across two frames. Of the group winners, the losing semi-finalists were Ken Doherty, who was the reigning IBSF World Under-21 Snooker Championship and IBSF World Snooker Championship holder; and the defending champion Sakchai Sim-Ngam, who progressed from a group that included Jon Birch, the 1989 IBSF World championship runner-up. Campbell received US$8,000 prize money as champion, and Finstad received US$4,000. Doherty compiled the highest break of the event, 79.

== Prize fund ==
Prize money was awarded as follows:

- Winner: US$8,000
- Runner-up: US$4,000
- Semi-finalists: US$2,400
- Group runner-up: US$1,200
- Group third place: US$600
- Highest break: US$1,000

== Main draw ==
Players in bold denote match winners.

**Semi-finals**; Best of 5 frames
**Marcus Campbell (SCO)**	**3**
Ken Doherty (IRE)	2
**Tom Finstad (CAN)**	**3**
Sakchai Sim-Ngam (THA)	1

**Final**; Best of 7 frames
**Marcus Campbell (SCO)**	**4**
Tom Finstad (CAN)	1
