= Martin Gould =

English professional snooker player

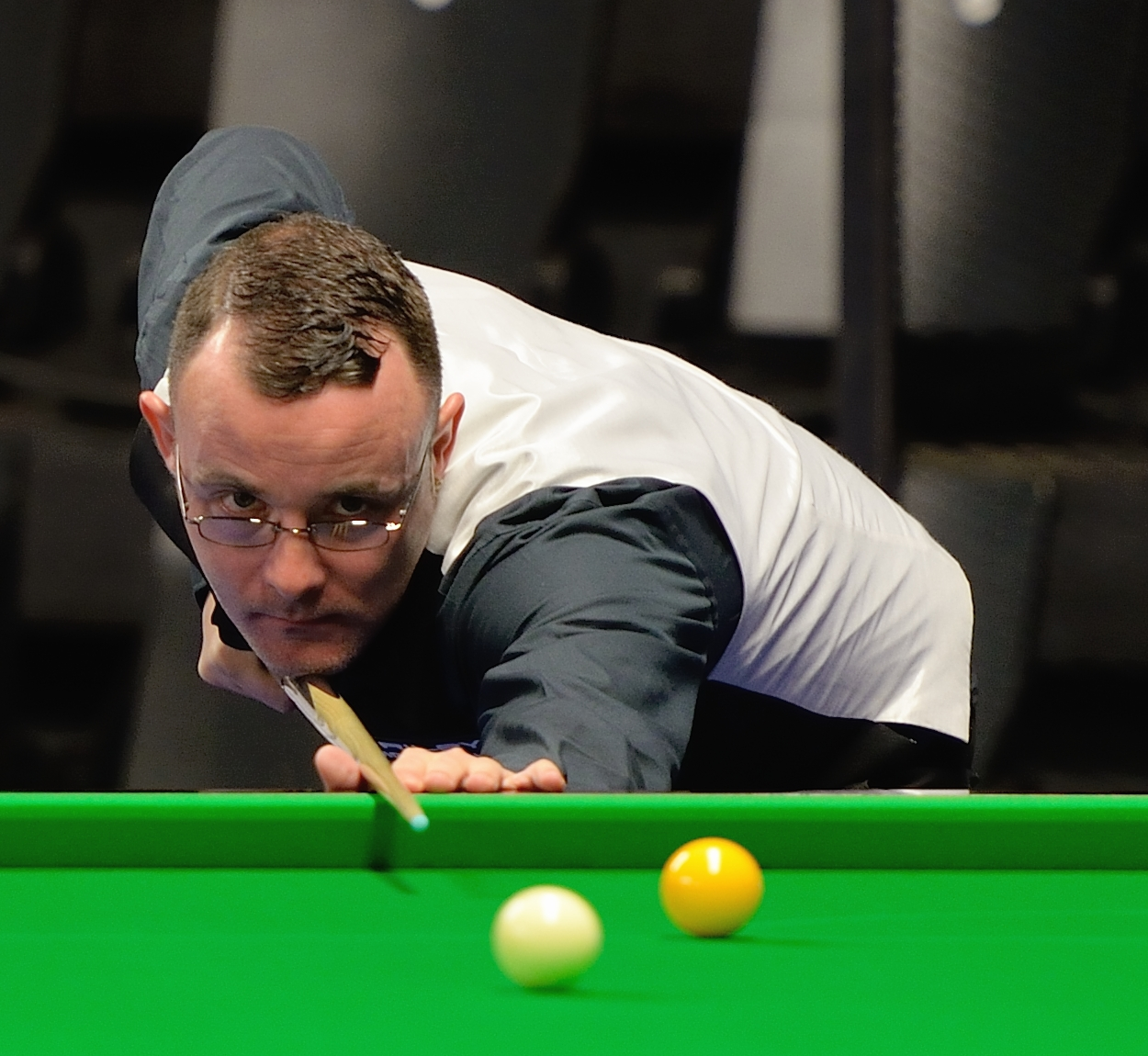
- Gould at the 2015 German Masters

Personal information
- Nickname: The Pinner Potter
- Born: 14 September 1981 (age 45) Pinner, London, England

Sport
- Country: England
- Sport: Snooker
- Professional: 2003/2004, 2007–2025
- Highest ranking: 11 (February–March 2012)
- Maximum breaks: 1
- Century breaks: 251

Tournament wins
- Ranking: 1
- Minor-ranking: 1

Martin Gould (born 14 September 1981) is an English former professional snooker player from Pinner in the London Borough of Harrow. He has appeared in four ranking finals and won one ranking title, the 2016 German Masters.

== Career ==
Gould began his professional career by playing the Challenge Tour in 2000, at the time the second-level professional tour. In 2002, Gould won his first English Amateur Championship, beating Craig Taylor in the final. Gould reached the semi-finals of the 2002 European Championship.

Gould enjoyed a good run in the qualification for the 2003 World Snooker Championship, winning eight matches, beating Alain Robidoux and Stephen Maguire. Gould's campaign ended when he lost to Patrick Wallace. However, he dropped off the Main Tour after this sole season and barely played for the next four years, due to looking after his terminally ill mother.

Gould returned to action in 2007 as he won his second English Amateur Championship, beating David Lilley 8–7 in a dramatic black-ball decider, as Lilley potted the black only for the white ball to go in-off. He then won the English Play-offs in Leeds to ensure his return to the Main Tour for 2007–08 season.

Gould reached the last 32 of the 2007 Northern Ireland Trophy, beating Matthew Stevens 5–4 from 0–3 down in the last 48. He also won multiple qualifying matches at both the UK Championship and World Championship qualifying events, although he did not ultimately qualify for either event. He finished the season inside the top 64.

Gould came through qualifying for the 2008 UK Championship, beating Supoj Saenla 9–1, Tom Ford 9–6, and in the final qualifying round overturned a 2–5 deficit to overcome Dominic Dale 9–6. In the first round Gould faced eventual champion Shaun Murphy. Murphy went 7–3 ahead before Gould rattled off four frames in a row to bring the score back to 7–7, but Murphy held on to seal a 9–7 victory. Gould then also reached the last 16 of a ranking event for the first time, at the 2009 Welsh Open, beating Stephen Hendry 5–3 in the last 32. Solid qualifying results in the remainder of the season helped him into the top 48 in the world rankings for 2009–10 season meaning Gould had only to win two matches to qualify for events. In the World Championship qualifying, Gould defeated Rodney Goggins 10–7, David Gilbert 10–8 and former top-16 player Matthew Stevens 10–4 to qualify for the World Championship, where he lost in the first round. Despite dismal results during the first tournaments of 2009–10 season, he again returned to the Crucible the following year and defeated Marco Fu 10–9 in the first round. In the second round he spectacularly led Neil Robertson 6–0, 11–5 and 12–10, playing arguably his best snooker ever, before ultimately losing 12–13. Robertson went on to win the championship that year.

Gould had a strong start to the 2010–11 season, reaching the last 16 of the Shanghai Masters after beating Stephen Hendry 5–3, and scored his major ranking quarter-final at the World Open, where he lost 1–3 to Peter Ebdon. He performed successfully during the minor-ranking PTC events, his best result being the final of the Event 6, where he lost 3–4 to Dominic Dale despite Dale needing snookers in the decider. Having qualified to the PTC Grand Finals, in March 2011 Gould reached his first career final, where he was beaten 0–4 by Shaun Murphy. Gould once again qualified for the World Championship, and defeated Marco Fu 10–8 in a repeat of the previous year's first round match. Gould was then defeated by reigning China Open champion and eventual World Championship runner-up, Judd Trump.

=== Top 16 breakthrough ===
Gould began the 2011–12 season by qualifying for the first two ranking events of the year, the Australian Goldfields Open and the Shanghai Masters, being knocked out in the first round by Stephen Hendry in the former and in the second round to Matthew Stevens in the latter. His consistent performances were enough to see him break into the elite top 16 for the first time in October, meaning he would no longer have to qualify for the ranking tournaments.

In November, Gould won the Power Snooker, a new cue sport tournament which was introduced in 2010, beating reigning champion Ronnie O'Sullivan in the final. This was the last Power Snooker tournament to be held. Gould finished 2011 by reaching the final of PTC Event 11, where he lost to Tom Ford 3–4. He also reached the semi-finals of Event 9 and Event 12 to finish 10th in the Order of Merit and seal his place in the Finals, where he lost 1–4 to eventual winner Stephen Lee in the last 24. Gould's recent rise up the world rankings earned him a place in the prestigious Masters tournament for the first time in 2012. Only the top 16 are invited to the event with Gould drawing Shaun Murphy in the first round and being beaten 2–6. After breaking into the top 16, Gould only won two matches in ranking events during the rest of the campaign. His season ended with three successive first round defeats, culminating in an 8–10 loss to David Gilbert in the World Championship. He finished the season ranked world number 14, meaning he had climbed 7 places during the year.

The 2012–13 season was a year of contrasts for Gould as he won three tournaments, but failed to perform in the ranking events. He began with a 3–5 defeat to Jamie Cope in the Wuxi Classic, but then beat Ken Doherty 5–3 and Cao Yupeng 5–4 to reach the quarter-finals of the Australian Goldfields Open where he lost 2–5 to Mark Davis. Gould then won his first professional title carrying ranking points at the minor-ranking Second PTC event of the season. He beat Stephen Maguire 4–3 in the final and credited his work with new coach Stephen Feeney as a major reason for his success. He couldn't translate this form in to the main ranking tournaments though, as he lost in the first round of the next three events and lost his qualifying match in another three to drop out of the top 16. At the Snooker Shoot-Out, the event where each match is played over one frame lasting 10-minute under shot clock rules, Gould won the title by beating Mark Allen in the final. The £32,000 cheque he received is the biggest of his career to date. Despite following this up with first round defeats in the World Open and PTC Finals, Gould had won Group 5 of the Championship League to qualify for the Winners Group. There he won three of his six matches to progress to the semi-finals where he beat Ding Junhui 3–0, before seeing off Ali Carter 3–2 to win the tournament with a century break in the deciding frame. Gould's season ended when he lost 5–10 to Shaun Murphy in the first round of the World Championship to finish the year ranked world number 25, a drop of 11 places from the start season.

=== 2013/2014 season ===
In the ranking events of the 2013–14 season, Gould reached the second round on four occasions but could never advance beyond this point. He also lost in the qualifying rounds for five other tournaments. Gould's best result on the European Tour was at the Rotterdam Open where he lost in the quarter-finals 3–4 to Mark Selby. For the second successive year he qualified for the Winners' group of the Championship League and won through to the semi-finals where he beat Stephen Maguire 3–0. Gould was unable to defend his title however, as he was defeated 1–3 in the final by Judd Trump. As the tournament is non-ranking Gould was unable to halt his slide down the rankings which meant he needed to win three qualifying matches to reach the first round of the World Championship. He did so with comprehensive 10–1 victories over Mitchell Travis and Igor Figueiredo and then beat Liang Wenbo 10–7. Gould played Marco Fu over whom he had already beaten twice in the event before, but he was unable to extend this into a hat-trick of triumphs as he lost 7–10. He fell five more places this season to end it as the world number 30.

=== 2014/2015 season ===
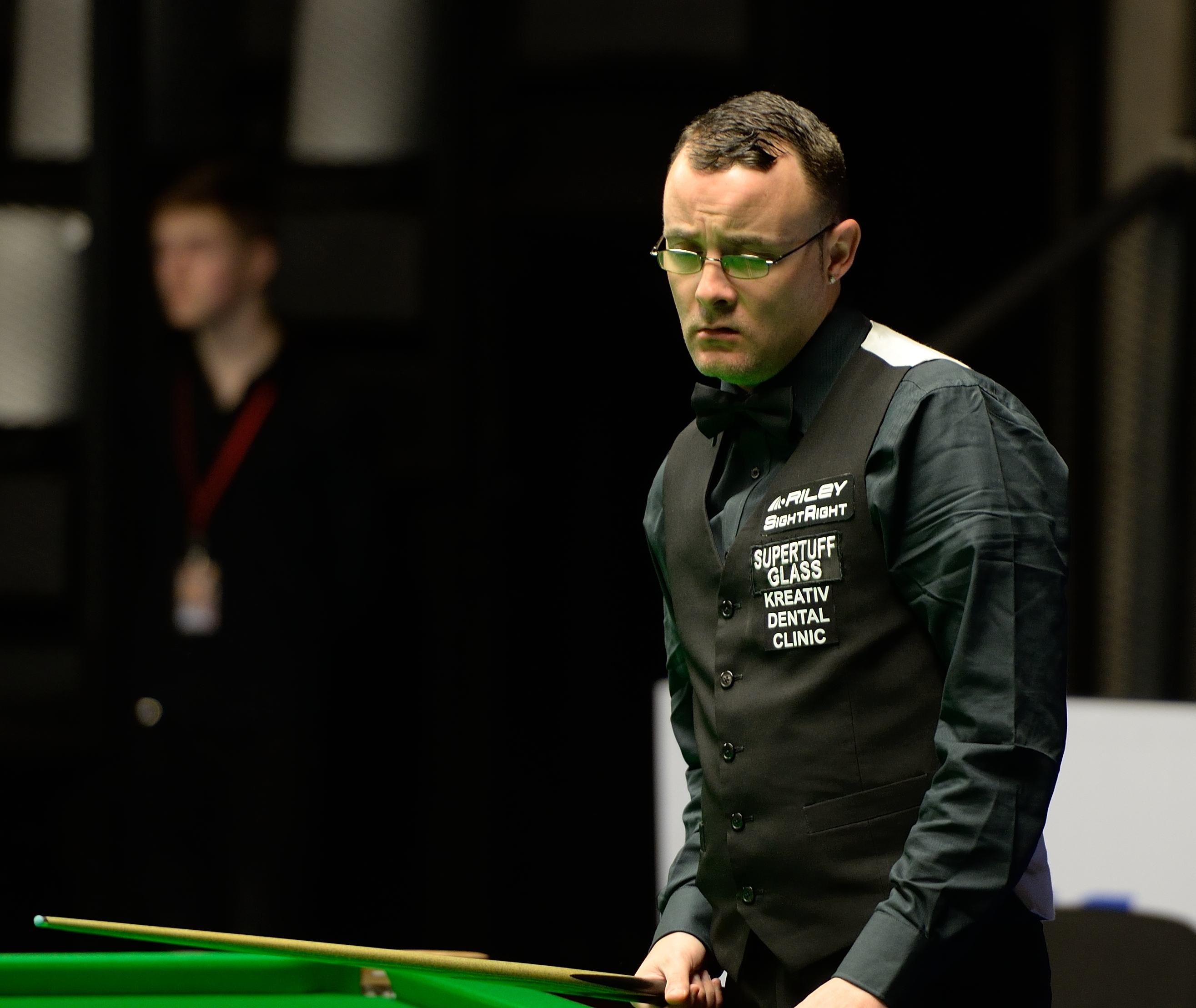
Martin Gould at the 2015 German Masters

Gould won three matches to advance to the quarter-finals of the 2014 Wuxi Classic and came from 0–57 down in the deciding frame against Stephen Maguire to beat him 5–4. In Gould's first ranking event semi-final since 2011 he was defeated 4–6 by Joe Perry. He was knocked out in the last 16 of both the Australian Goldfields Open and Shanghai Masters. In October, he reached the final of the Bulgarian Open, but lost 2–4 to Shaun Murphy. At the inaugural World Grand Prix, Gould knocked out Alan McManus 4–1, Mark Selby 4–2 and Peter Ebdon 4–2 to meet Judd Trump in the semi-finals. Gould made a 111 break to go 5–1 up, but incredibly lost five frames in a row (during which Trump outscored him 395–37) to be defeated 5–6. He had a chance to exact revenge in the very next event as he met Trump again in the quarter-finals of the PTC Grand Final after eliminating Michael White and turning the tables on Shaun Murphy, but was beaten 2–4. However, Gould's good season ended with a surprise 6–10 loss to amateur Adam Duffy in the first round of World Championship qualifying.

=== 2015/2016 season: First ranking event win ===
Gould's season began at the Australian Goldfields Open, where he beat Marco Fu 5–4, Michael Holt 5–3 and Matthew Selt 5–1. He then eased past Stephen Maguire 6–1 in the semi-finals to play in the second ranking event final of his career, in which he made two centuries and came back from 5–7 down to level John Higgins at 8–8. Gould had the first chance in the deciding frame, but could only score eight points as an 89 break from Higgins denied him the title. Gould qualified for the Shanghai Masters by beating Liam Highfield 5–2 in the final round of qualifying, and beat Barry Hawkins 5–1 in the last 32, before getting revenge on John Higgins for the defeat in Australia by beating him 5–3. He crashed out to Stuart Bingham 4–5 in the quarter-finals despite leading 4–2. Gould would also suffer disappointment at the UK Championship as he let a 5–1 lead slip against underdog David Grace in the quarter-finals, losing 5–6 after having several chances to close out the victory.

At the German Masters, Gould defeated Mark Williams 5–4 in the last 32, Ben Woollaston 5–0 in the last 16, Judd Trump 5–4 in the quarter-finals (after having suffered three close losses to him the previous season), Graeme Dott 6–2 in the semi-finals and Belgian Luca Brecel 9–5 in the final to win the first ranking title of his professional career. Gould lost in the final of the Gdynia Open 1–4 to Mark Selby. After being knocked out in the second round of the World Grand Prix by Shaun Murphy, Gould ended the season with three first round defeats, culminating with an 8–10 loss to Ding Junhui at the World Championship.

=== 2016/2017 season ===
A run of failing to get past the third round of a ranking event in the 2016–17 season ended when Gould played in the 2017 German Masters. The defending champion beat Jamie Jones 5–0, Ricky Walden 5–3 and Ryan Day 5–2 to face Ali Carter in the semi-finals and he was defeated 2–6. The run gave Gould the final place for the World Grand Prix and he edged out Mark Selby 4–3, before losing 3–4 to Joe Perry. Gould won three matches to qualify for the World Championship and fell 2–7 behind John Higgins in the opening session of the first round. He threatened a fightback upon his return, but would be eliminated 6–10.

=== 2017 - present ===
At the 2019 World Championship, Gould was defeated 7–10 by Mark Williams in the first round. At the 2020 World Championship, Gould beat Stephen Maguire 10–3 in the first round, before losing 9–13 in the second round to Kyren Wilson.

== Performance and rankings timeline ==
Tournament	1999/ 00	2000/ 01	2001/ 02	2002/ 03	2003/ 04	2004/ 05	2007/ 08	2008/ 09	2009/ 10	2010/ 11	2011/ 12	2012/ 13	2013/ 14	2014/ 15	2015/ 16	2016/ 17	2017/ 18	2018/ 19	2019/ 20	2020/ 21	2021/ 22	2022/ 23	2023/ 24	2024/ 25
Ranking (Note: From the 2010/2011 season it shows the ranking at the beginning of the season)	(Note: He was an amateur)				(Note: New players don't have a ranking)			63	46	43	21	14	25	30	26	15	15	24	32	53	25	29	60	70
Ranking tournaments
Championship League	Tournament Not Held						Non-Ranking Event													2R	RR	A	RR	A
Xi'an Grand Prix	Tournament Not Held																							WD
Saudi Arabia Masters	Tournament Not Held																							A
English Open	Tournament Not Held															3R	1R	3R	1R	1R	2R	3R	1R	A
British Open	A	A	A	A	LQ	A	Tournament Not Held														2R	LQ	LQ	WD
Wuhan Open	Tournament Not Held																						A	WD
Northern Ireland Open	Tournament Not Held															A	A	A	1R	4R	1R	1R	LQ	A
International Championship	Tournament Not Held											1R	2R	2R	1R	1R	SF	3R	1R	Not Held			A	A
UK Championship	A	A	A	A	LQ	A	LQ	1R	LQ	1R	2R	1R	1R	2R	QF	2R	QF	2R	2R	1R	2R	LQ	LQ	A
Shoot Out	Tournament Not Held									Non-Ranking Event						1R	3R	2R	1R	3R	1R	3R	WD	A
Scottish Open (Note: The event was called the Players Championship (2003/2004))	A	A	A	A	LQ	Tournament Not Held						MR	Not Held			WD	1R	A	3R	1R	3R	1R	WD	A
German Masters	Tournament Not Held									LQ	1R	LQ	LQ	2R	W	SF	1R	LQ	LQ	LQ	LQ	LQ	WD	A
Welsh Open	A	A	A	A	LQ	A	LQ	2R	LQ	LQ	2R	LQ	2R	3R	4R	1R	4R	1R	1R	3R	LQ	1R	WD	A
World Open (Note: The event was called the Grand Prix (1999/2000–2000/2001 and 2004/2005–2009/2010) and the LG Cup (2001/2002–2003/2004))	A	A	A	A	LQ	A	LQ	LQ	LQ	QF	1R	1R	1R	Not Held		LQ	2R	A	A	Not Held			A	A
World Grand Prix	Tournament Not Held													NR	2R	2R	1R	DNQ	DNQ	QF	2R	DNQ	DNQ	DNQ
Players Championship (Note: The event was called the Players Tour Championship Grand Final (2010/2011–2015/2016))	Tournament Not Held									F	1R	1R	DNQ	QF	1R	DNQ	DNQ	DNQ	DNQ	1R	DNQ	DNQ	DNQ	DNQ
Tour Championship	Tournament Not Held																	DNQ	DNQ	DNQ	DNQ	DNQ	DNQ	DNQ
World Championship	LQ	LQ	LQ	LQ	LQ	LQ	LQ	1R	2R	2R	1R	1R	1R	LQ	1R	1R	LQ	1R	2R	1R	LQ	LQ	WD	A
Non-ranking tournaments
Champion of Champions	Tournament Not Held												1R	A	A	QF	A	A	1R	A	A	A	A	A
The Masters	A	A	LQ	A	LQ	A	LQ	LQ	LQ	A	1R	A	A	A	A	A	A	A	A	A	A	A	A	A
Championship League	Tournament Not Held						A	A	A	RR	RR	W	F	WD	RR	RR	2R	W	A	A	RR	A	A	A
Former ranking tournaments
Irish Masters	Non-Ranking			A	LQ	A	Tournament Not Held																	
Northern Ireland Trophy	Tournament Not Held						2R	LQ	Tournament Not Held															
Bahrain Championship	Tournament Not Held							LQ	Tournament Not Held															
Wuxi Classic (Note: The event was called the Jiangsu Classic (2008/2009–2009/2010))	Tournament Not Held							Non-Ranking Event				1R	2R	SF	Tournament Not Held									
Australian Goldfields Open	Tournament Not Held										1R	QF	1R	2R	F	Tournament Not Held								
Shanghai Masters	Tournament Not Held						LQ	LQ	LQ	2R	2R	1R	2R	2R	QF	WR	QF	Non-Ranking		Not Held			Non-Ranking	
Paul Hunter Classic (Note: The event was called the Grand Prix Fürth (2004/2005) and the Fürth German Open (2005/2006–2006/2007))	Tournament Not Held					Pro-am Event				Minor-Ranking Event						1R	1R	A	NR	Tournament Not Held				
Indian Open	Tournament Not Held												LQ	A	NH	3R	LQ	A	Tournament Not Held					
China Open	A	A	A	Not Held		A	LQ	LQ	LQ	1R	1R	LQ	LQ	A	1R	2R	1R	LQ	Tournament Not Held					
Riga Masters (Note: The event was called the Riga Open (2014/2015–2015/2016))	Tournament Not Held													Minor-Rank		2R	LQ	LQ	LQ	Tournament Not Held				
China Championship	Tournament Not Held															NR	3R	LQ	2R	Tournament Not Held				
WST Pro Series	Tournament Not Held																			RR	Tournament Not Held			
Turkish Masters	Tournament Not Held																				QF	Not Held		
Gibraltar Open	Tournament Not Held														MR	A	A	A	3R	3R	A	Not Held		
WST Classic	Tournament Not Held																					3R	Not Held	
European Masters (Note: The event was called the European Open (2001/2002–2003/2004) and the Malta Cup (2004/2005 and 2007/2008))	Not Held		A	A	LQ	A	NR	Tournament Not Held								LQ	1R	LQ	LQ	F	2R	LQ	LQ	NH
Former non-ranking tournaments
Brazil Masters	Tournament Not Held										1R	Tournament Not Held												
Power Snooker	Tournament Not Held									A	W	Tournament Not Held												
World Grand Prix	Tournament Not Held													SF	Ranking Event									
General Cup (Note: The event was called the General Cup International (2004/2005–2011/2012))	Tournament Not Held					A	Not Held		A	NH	A	A	A	A	RR	Tournament Not Held								
Shoot Out	Tournament Not Held									1R	QF	W	1R	3R	2R	Ranking Event								
Six-red World Championship (Note: The event was called the Six-red Snooker International (2008/2009) and the Six-red World Grand Prix (2009/2010))	Tournament Not Held							QF	A	A	NH	RR	A	A	A	2R	RR	A	A	Not Held		A	Not Held	
Haining Open	Tournament Not Held													Minor-Rank		SF	A	A	A	NH	A	NH	A	NH

Performance Table Legend
LQ	lost in the qualifying draw	#R	lost in the early rounds of the tournament (WR = Wildcard round, RR = Round robin)	QF	lost in the quarter-finals
SF	lost in the semi-finals	F	lost in the final	W	won the tournament
DNQ	did not qualify for the tournament	A	did not participate in the tournament	WD	withdrew from the tournament

NH / Not Held	means an event was not held.
NR / Non-Ranking Event	means an event is/was no longer a ranking event.
R / Ranking Event	means an event is/was a ranking event.
MR / Minor-Ranking Event	means an event is/was a minor-ranking event.
PA / Pro-am Event	means an event is/was a pro-am event.

== Career finals ==
=== Ranking finals: 4 (1 title) ===
Outcome	No.	Year	Championship	Opponent in the final	Score
Runner-up	1.	2011	Players Tour Championship Grand Final	(England) Shaun Murphy	0–4
Runner-up	2.	2015	Australian Goldfields Open	(Scotland) John Higgins	8–9
Winner	1.	2016	German Masters	(Belgium) Luca Brecel	9–5
Runner-up	3.	2020	European Masters	(England) Mark Selby	8–9

=== Minor-ranking finals: 5 (1 title) ===
Outcome	No.	Year	Championship	Opponent in the final	Score
Runner-up	1.	2010	Players Tour Championship – Event 6	(Wales) Dominic Dale	3–4
Runner-up	2.	2011	Players Tour Championship – Event 11	(England) Tom Ford	3–4
Winner	1.	2012	Players Tour Championship – Event 2	(Scotland) Stephen Maguire	4–3
Runner-up	3.	2014	Bulgarian Open	(England) Shaun Murphy	2–4
Runner-up	4.	2016	Gdynia Open	(England) Mark Selby	1–4

=== Non-ranking finals: 6 (4 titles) ===
Outcome	No.	Year	Championship	Opponent in the final	Score
Runner-up	1.	2009	Pro Challenge Series – Event 2	(Republic of Ireland) Ken Doherty	2−6
Winner	1.	2011	Power Snooker	(England) Ronnie O'Sullivan	(Note: This format was based on points. Gould won 286–258.)
Winner	2.	2013	Snooker Shoot Out	(Northern Ireland) Mark Allen	1–0
Winner	3.	2013	Championship League	(England) Ali Carter	3–2
Runner-up	2.	2014	Championship League	(England) Judd Trump	1–3
Winner	4.	2019	Championship League (2)	(England) Jack Lisowski	3–1

=== Team finals: 2 ===
Outcome	No.	Year	Championship	Team/partner	Opponent(s) in the final	Score
Runner-up	1.	2010	World Mixed Doubles Championship	(England) Pam Wood	(England) Joe Perry (Latvia) Tatjana Vasiljeva	1–3
Runner-up	2.	2011	World Mixed Doubles Championship (2)	(England) Pam Wood	(England) Joe Perry (Latvia) Tatjana Vasiljeva	2–3

=== Amateur finals: 3 (2 titles) ===
Outcome	No.	Year	Championship	Opponent in the final	Score
Winner	1.	2002	English Amateur Championship	(England) Craig Taylor	8–6
Runner-up	1.	2005	PIOS – Event 1	(China) Tian Pengfei	3–6
Winner	2.	2007	English Amateur Championship (2)	(England) David Lilley	8–7
