= 1989 Kent Cup =

Kent Cup
Tournament information
- Dates: 20–23 April 1989
- City: Beijing
- Country: China
- Organisation: Pro-Tex Sports Management
- Format: Non-ranking event
- Total prize fund: US$25,000
- Winner's share: US$8,000

Final
- Champion: Sakchai Sim-Ngam (THA)
- Runner-up: Franky Chan (HKG)
- Score: 4–1

The 1989 Kent Cup was an invitational non-ranking snooker tournament held in Beijing from 20 to 23 April 1989. Sakchai Sim-Ngam won the event, defeating Franky Chan 4–1 in the final. The tournament was promoted by Pro-Tex Sports Management, a Hong Kong company, working with the China Billiards and Snooker Association.

The event features a total prize fund of US$25,000 and US$8,000 awarded to the winner. This was a significant reduction from the previous year's total prize fund of £120,000. John Parrott was the defending champion, but he was not eligible for this year's edition, as it was held exclusively for the players from the Asia–Pacific region. The invited competitors were sixteen players from eight countries – Australia, China, Hong Kong, New Zealand, Philippines, Singapore, Taiwan and Thailand.

== Main draw ==
Quarter-finals; Best of 3 frames
(Thailand) Sakchai Sim-Ngam	2
(China) Zhong Minwen	0
(Singapore) Lim Koon Guan	2
(Hong Kong) Kenny Kwok	1
(Australia) James Bonner	2
(Singapore) Lau Weng Yew	1
(New Zealand) Steve Robertson	1
(Hong Kong) Franky Chan	2

Semi-finals; Best of 5 frames
(Thailand) Sakchai Sim-Ngam	3
(Singapore) Lim Koon Guan	1
(Australia) James Bonner	2
(Hong Kong) Franky Chan	3

Final; Best of 7 frames
(Thailand) Sakchai Sim-Ngam	4
(Hong Kong) Franky Chan	1
