= 2013 Championship League =

Championship League
Tournament information
- Dates: 7 January – 21 March 2013
- Venue: Crondon Park Golf Club
- City: Stock
- Country: England
- Organisation: Matchroom Sport
- Format: Non-ranking event
- Total prize fund: £177,200
- Winner's share: £10,000 (plus bonuses)
- Highest break: Stephen Maguire (SCO) (146)

Final
- Champion: Martin Gould (ENG)
- Runner-up: Ali Carter (ENG)
- Score: 3–2

The 2013 Championship League was a professional non-ranking snooker tournament that was played from 7 January to 21 March 2013 at the Crondon Park Golf Club in Stock, England.

Ding Junhui was the defending champion. but he lost 0–3 against Martin Gould in the semi-finals of the winners group.

Gould won his fourth professional title by defeating Ali Carter 3–2 in the final, and earned a place at the 2013 Champion of Champions.

== Prize fund ==
The breakdown of prize money for this year is shown below:

- Group 1–7
  - Winner: £3,000
  - Runner-up: £2,000
  - Semi-final: £1,000
  - Frame-win (league stage): £100
  - Frame-win (play-offs): £300
  - Highest break: £500
- Winners group
  - Winner: £10,000
  - Runner-up: £5,000
  - Semi-final: £3,000
  - Frame-win (league stage): £200
  - Frame-win (play-offs): £300
  - Highest break: £1,000
- Tournament total: £177,200

== Group one ==
Group one matches were played on 7 and 8 January 2013. John Higgins was the first player to qualify for the winners group.

=== Matches ===
- Judd Trump 1–3 John Higgins
- Shaun Murphy 0–3 Ali Carter
- Matthew Stevens 3–2 Mark Davis
- Martin Gould 3–0 Judd Trump
- John Higgins 3–0 Shaun Murphy
- Ali Carter 3–0 Matthew Stevens
- Mark Davis 3–0 Martin Gould
- Judd Trump 3–0 Shaun Murphy
- John Higgins 3–2 Ali Carter
- Matthew Stevens 0–3 Martin Gould
- Shaun Murphy 3–2 Martin Gould
- Mark Davis 3–0 Ali Carter
- Judd Trump 3–1 Mark Davis
- John Higgins 3–2 Matthew Stevens
- Ali Carter 2–3 Martin Gould
- Shaun Murphy 2–3 Mark Davis
- John Higgins 3–1 Martin Gould
- Judd Trump 3–2 Matthew Stevens
- Shaun Murphy 3–0 Matthew Stevens
- John Higgins 0–3 Mark Davis
- Judd Trump 0–3 Ali Carter

=== Table ===
Pos	Player	Pld	W	L	FF	FA	FD	
1	John Higgins (SCO)	6	5	1	15	9	+6	Qualification to Group 1 play-off
2	Mark Davis (ENG)	6	4	2	15	8	+7	Qualification to Group 1 play-off
3	Ali Carter (ENG)	6	3	3	13	9	+4	Qualification to Group 1 play-off
4	Martin Gould (ENG)	6	3	3	12	11	+1	Qualification to Group 1 play-off
5	Judd Trump (ENG)	6	3	3	10	12	−2	Advances into Group 2
6	Shaun Murphy (ENG)	6	2	4	8	14	−6	Eliminated from the competition
7	Matthew Stevens (WAL)	6	1	5	7	17	−10	Eliminated from the competition

=== Play-offs ===
Semi-finals; Best of 5 frames
1	John Higgins (SCO)	3
4	Martin Gould (ENG)	1
2	Mark Davis (ENG)	2
3	Ali Carter (ENG)	3

Final; Best of 5 frames
1	John Higgins (SCO)	3
3	Ali Carter (ENG)	1

== Group two ==
Group two matches were played on 9 and 10 January 2013. Ali Carter was the second player to qualify for the winners group.

=== Matches ===
- Ali Carter 3–0 Mark Davis
- Martin Gould 3–2 Judd Trump
- Stephen Maguire 1–3 Neil Robertson
- Stuart Bingham 0–3 Ali Carter
- Mark Davis 2–3 Martin Gould
- Judd Trump 1–3 Stephen Maguire
- Neil Robertson 3–0 Stuart Bingham
- Ali Carter 3–2 Martin Gould
- Mark Davis 2–3 Judd Trump
- Stephen Maguire 1–3 Stuart Bingham
- Martin Gould 0–3 Stuart Bingham
- Neil Robertson 3–1 Judd Trump
- Ali Carter 3–2 Neil Robertson
- Mark Davis 0–3 Stephen Maguire
- Judd Trump 3–2 Stuart Bingham
- Martin Gould 3–1 Neil Robertson
- Mark Davis 3–1 Stuart Bingham
- Ali Carter 2–3 Stephen Maguire
- Martin Gould 3–0 Stephen Maguire
- Mark Davis 3–1 Neil Robertson
- Ali Carter 3–2 Judd Trump

=== Table ===
Pos	Player	Pld	W	L	FF	FA	FD	
1	Ali Carter (ENG)	6	5	1	17	9	+8	Qualification to Group 2 play-off
2	Martin Gould (ENG)	6	4	2	14	11	+3	Qualification to Group 2 play-off
3	Neil Robertson (AUS)	6	3	3	13	11	+2	Qualification to Group 2 play-off
4	Stephen Maguire (SCO)	6	3	3	11	12	−1	Qualification to Group 2 play-off
5	Judd Trump (ENG)	6	2	4	12	16	−4	Advances into Group 3
6	Mark Davis (ENG)	6	2	4	10	14	−4	Eliminated from the competition
7	Stuart Bingham (ENG)	6	2	4	9	13	−4	Eliminated from the competition

=== Play-offs ===
Semi-finals; Best of 5 frames
1	Ali Carter (ENG)	3
4	Stephen Maguire (SCO)	2
2	Martin Gould (ENG)	3
3	Neil Robertson (AUS)	1

Final; Best of 5 frames
1	Ali Carter (ENG)	3
2	Martin Gould (ENG)	0

== Group three ==
Group three matches were played on 21 and 22 January 2013. Ding Junhui was the third player to qualify for the winners group.

=== Matches ===
- Martin Gould 2–3 Neil Robertson
- Stephen Maguire 3–2 Judd Trump
- Mark Selby 3–1 Mark Williams
- Ding Junhui 3–1 Martin Gould
- Neil Robertson 0–3 Stephen Maguire
- Judd Trump 1–3 Mark Selby
- Mark Williams 0–3 Ding Junhui
- Martin Gould 2–3 Stephen Maguire
- Neil Robertson 2–3 Judd Trump
- Mark Selby 3–1 Ding Junhui
- Stephen Maguire 3–1 Ding Junhui
- Mark Williams 3–1 Judd Trump
- Judd Trump 3–0 Ding Junhui
- Stephen Maguire 1–3 Mark Williams
- Martin Gould 3–1 Mark Williams
- Neil Robertson 1–3 Mark Selby
- Neil Robertson 1–3 Ding Junhui
- Martin Gould 3–2 Mark Selby
- Stephen Maguire 3–1 Mark Selby
- Neil Robertson 3–1 Mark Williams
- Martin Gould 0–3 Judd Trump

=== Table ===
Pos	Player	Pld	W	L	FF	FA	FD	
1	Stephen Maguire (SCO)	6	5	1	16	9	+7	Qualification to Group 3 play-off
2	Mark Selby (ENG)	6	4	2	15	10	+5	Qualification to Group 3 play-off
3	Judd Trump (ENG)	6	3	3	13	11	+2	Qualification to Group 3 play-off
4	Ding Junhui (CHN)	6	3	3	11	11	0	Qualification to Group 3 play-off
5	Martin Gould (ENG)	6	2	4	11	15	−4	Advances into Group 4
6	Neil Robertson (AUS)	6	2	4	10	15	−5	Eliminated from the competition
7	Mark Williams (WAL)	6	2	4	9	14	−5	Eliminated from the competition

=== Play-offs ===
Semi-finals; Best of 5 frames
1	Stephen Maguire (SCO)	1
4	Ding Junhui (CHN)	3
2	Mark Selby (ENG)	1
3	Judd Trump (ENG)	3

Final; Best of 5 frames
4	Ding Junhui (CHN)	3
3	Judd Trump (ENG)	2

== Group four ==
Group four matches were played on 23 and 24 January 2013. Mark Allen was the fourth player to qualify for the winners group.

=== Matches ===
- Judd Trump 2–3 Stephen Maguire
- Mark Selby 0–3 Martin Gould
- Ricky Walden 1–3 Mark Allen
- Barry Hawkins 1–3 Judd Trump
- Stephen Maguire 0–3 Mark Selby
- Martin Gould 0–3 Ricky Walden
- Mark Allen 3–1 Barry Hawkins
- Judd Trump 3–1 Mark Selby
- Stephen Maguire 3–0 Martin Gould
- Ricky Walden 1–3 Barry Hawkins
- Mark Selby 3–2 Barry Hawkins
- Mark Allen 3–0 Martin Gould
- Judd Trump 0–3 Mark Allen
- Stephen Maguire 3–0 Ricky Walden
- Martin Gould 3–2 Barry Hawkins
- Mark Selby 0–3 Mark Allen
- Stephen Maguire 2–3 Barry Hawkins
- Judd Trump 2–3 Ricky Walden
- Mark Selby 2–3 Ricky Walden
- Stephen Maguire 1–3 Mark Allen
- Judd Trump 1–3 Martin Gould

=== Table ===
Pos	Player	Pld	W	L	FF	FA	FD	
1	Mark Allen (NIR)	6	6	0	18	3	+15	Qualification to Group 4 play-off
2	Stephen Maguire (SCO)	6	3	3	12	11	+1	Qualification to Group 4 play-off
3	Ricky Walden (ENG)	6	3	3	11	13	−2	Qualification to Group 4 play-off
4	Martin Gould (ENG)	6	3	3	9	12	−3	Qualification to Group 4 play-off
5	Barry Hawkins (ENG)	6	2	4	12	15	−3	Advances into Group 5
6	Judd Trump (ENG)	6	2	4	11	14	−3	Eliminated from the competition
7	Mark Selby (ENG)	6	2	4	9	14	−5	Eliminated from the competition

=== Play-offs ===
Semi-finals; Best of 5 frames
1	Mark Allen (NIR)	3
4	Martin Gould (ENG)	0
2	Stephen Maguire (SCO)	3
3	Ricky Walden (ENG)	2

Final; Best of 5 frames
1	Mark Allen (NIR)	3
2	Stephen Maguire (SCO)	2

== Group five ==
Group five matches were played on 4 and 5 February 2013. Martin Gould was the fifth player to qualify for the winners group.

=== Matches ===
- Stephen Maguire 3–0 Ricky Walden
- Martin Gould 0–3 Barry Hawkins
- Joe Perry 3–2 Peter Ebdon
- Ryan Day 0–3 Stephen Maguire
- Ricky Walden 3–1 Martin Gould
- Barry Hawkins 1–3 Joe Perry
- Peter Ebdon 1–3 Ryan Day
- Stephen Maguire 3–2 Martin Gould
- Ricky Walden 1–3 Barry Hawkins
- Joe Perry 1–3 Ryan Day
- Martin Gould 3–0 Ryan Day
- Peter Ebdon 0–3 Barry Hawkins
- Stephen Maguire 3–0 Peter Ebdon
- Ricky Walden 3–1 Joe Perry
- Barry Hawkins 3–1 Ryan Day
- Martin Gould 3–1 Peter Ebdon
- Ricky Walden 1–3 Ryan Day
- Stephen Maguire 3–2 Joe Perry
- Martin Gould 3–2 Joe Perry
- Ricky Walden 3–0 Peter Ebdon
- Stephen Maguire 2–3 Barry Hawkins

=== Table ===
Pos	Player	Pld	W	L	FF	FA	FD	
1	Stephen Maguire (SCO)	6	5	1	17	7	+10	Qualification to Group 5 play-off
2	Barry Hawkins (ENG)	6	5	1	16	7	+9	Qualification to Group 5 play-off
3	Martin Gould (ENG)	6	3	3	12	12	0	Qualification to Group 5 play-off
4	Ricky Walden (ENG)	6	3	3	11	11	0	Qualification to Group 5 play-off
5	Ryan Day (WAL)	6	3	3	10	12	−2	Advances into Group 6
6	Joe Perry (ENG)	6	2	4	12	15	−3	Eliminated from the competition
7	Peter Ebdon (ENG)	6	0	6	4	18	−14	Eliminated from the competition

=== Play-offs ===
Semi-finals; Best of 5 frames
1	Stephen Maguire (SCO)	3
4	Ricky Walden (ENG)	0
2	Barry Hawkins (ENG)	1
3	Martin Gould (ENG)	3

Final; Best of 5 frames
1	Stephen Maguire (SCO)	1
3	Martin Gould (ENG)	3

== Group six ==
Group six matches were played on 6 and 7 February 2013. Barry Hawkins was the sixth player to qualify for the winners group.

=== Matches ===
- Stephen Maguire 0–3 Barry Hawkins
- Ricky Walden 1–3 Ryan Day
- Marcus Campbell 2–3 Marco Fu
- Dominic Dale 3–1 Stephen Maguire
- Barry Hawkins 1–3 Ricky Walden
- Ryan Day 3–1 Marcus Campbell
- Marco Fu 2–3 Dominic Dale
- Stephen Maguire 3–0 Ricky Walden
- Barry Hawkins 3–0 Ryan Day
- Marcus Campbell 3–0 Dominic Dale
- Ricky Walden 3–2 Dominic Dale
- Marco Fu 1–3 Ryan Day
- Stephen Maguire 3–2 Marco Fu
- Barry Hawkins 3–0 Marcus Campbell
- Ryan Day 1–3 Dominic Dale
- Ricky Walden 0–3 Marco Fu
- Barry Hawkins 3–1 Dominic Dale
- Stephen Maguire 3–1 Marcus Campbell
- Ricky Walden 3–0 Marcus Campbell
- Barry Hawkins 1–3 Marco Fu
- Stephen Maguire 3–2 Ryan Day

=== Table ===
Pos	Player	Pld	W	L	FF	FA	FD	
1	Barry Hawkins (ENG)	6	4	2	14	7	+7	Qualification to Group 6 play-off
2	Stephen Maguire (SCO)	6	4	2	13	11	+2	Qualification to Group 6 play-off
3	Marco Fu (HKG)	6	3	3	14	12	+2	Qualification to Group 6 play-off
4	Ryan Day (WAL)	6	3	3	12	12	0	Qualification to Group 6 play-off
5	Dominic Dale (WAL)	6	3	3	12	13	−1	Advances into Group 7
6	Ricky Walden (ENG)	6	3	3	10	12	−2	Eliminated from the competition
7	Marcus Campbell (SCO)	6	1	5	7	15	−8	Eliminated from the competition

=== Play-offs ===
Semi-finals; Best of 5 frames
1	Barry Hawkins (ENG)	3
4	Ryan Day (WAL)	0
2	Stephen Maguire (SCO)	3
3	Marco Fu (HKG)	1

Final; Best of 5 frames
1	Barry Hawkins (ENG)	3
2	Stephen Maguire (SCO)	1

== Group seven ==
Group seven matches were played on 18 and 19 March 2013. Marco Fu was the last player to qualify for the winners group.

=== Matches ===
- Stephen Maguire 3–0 Marco Fu
- Ryan Day 2–3 Dominic Dale
- Andrew Higginson 3–0 Tom Ford
- Robert Milkins 3–1 Stephen Maguire
- Marco Fu 3–1 Ryan Day
- Dominic Dale 2–3 Andrew Higginson
- Tom Ford 0–3 Robert Milkins
- Stephen Maguire 3–0 Ryan Day
- Marco Fu 3–1 Dominic Dale
- Andrew Higginson 1–3 Robert Milkins
- Ryan Day 3–0 Robert Milkins
- Tom Ford 1–3 Dominic Dale
- Stephen Maguire 2–3 Tom Ford
- Marco Fu 3–2 Andrew Higginson
- Dominic Dale 3–2 Robert Milkins
- Ryan Day 2–3 Tom Ford
- Marco Fu 3–1 Robert Milkins
- Stephen Maguire 3–2 Andrew Higginson
- Ryan Day 2–3 Andrew Higginson
- Marco Fu 3–1 Tom Ford
- Stephen Maguire 3–0 Dominic Dale

=== Table ===
Pos	Player	Pld	W	L	FF	FA	FD	
1	Marco Fu (HKG)	6	5	1	15	9	+6	Qualification to Group 7 play-off
2	Stephen Maguire (SCO)	6	4	2	15	8	+7	Qualification to Group 7 play-off
3	Andrew Higginson (ENG)	6	3	3	14	13	+1	Qualification to Group 7 play-off
4	Robert Milkins (ENG)	6	3	3	12	11	+1	Qualification to Group 7 play-off
5	Dominic Dale (WAL)	6	3	3	12	14	−2	Eliminated from the competition
6	Tom Ford (ENG)	6	2	4	8	16	−8	Eliminated from the competition
7	Ryan Day (WAL)	6	1	5	10	15	−5	Eliminated from the competition

=== Play-offs ===
Semi-finals; Best of 5 frames
1	Marco Fu (HKG)	3
4	Robert Milkins (ENG)	0
2	Stephen Maguire (SCO)	3
3	Andrew Higginson (ENG)	1

Final; Best of 5 frames
1	Marco Fu (HKG)	3
2	Stephen Maguire (SCO)	0

== Winners group ==
The matches of the winners group were played on 20 and 21 March 2013. Martin Gould won his first Championship League title.

=== Matches ===
- John Higgins 1–3 Ali Carter
- Ding Junhui 3–1 Mark Allen
- Martin Gould 2–3 Barry Hawkins
- Marco Fu 0–3 John Higgins
- Ali Carter 3–1 Ding Junhui
- Mark Allen 0–3 Martin Gould
- Barry Hawkins 0–3 Marco Fu
- John Higgins 1–3 Ding Junhui
- Ali Carter 2–3 Mark Allen
- Martin Gould 2–3 Marco Fu
- Ding Junhui 3–2 Marco Fu
- Barry Hawkins 1–3 Mark Allen
- John Higgins 0–3 Barry Hawkins
- Ali Carter 0–3 Martin Gould
- Mark Allen 0–3 Marco Fu
- Ding Junhui 3–2 Barry Hawkins
- Ali Carter 3–1 Marco Fu
- John Higgins 3–0 Martin Gould
- Ding Junhui 1–3 Martin Gould
- Ali Carter 3–0 Barry Hawkins
- John Higgins 1–3 Mark Allen

=== Table ===
Pos	Player	Pld	W	L	FF	FA	FD	
1	Ali Carter (ENG)	6	4	2	14	9	+5	Qualification to Winners' Group play-off
2	Ding Junhui (CHN)	6	4	2	14	12	+2	Qualification to Winners' Group play-off
3	Martin Gould (ENG)	6	3	3	13	10	+3	Qualification to Winners' Group play-off
4	Marco Fu (HKG)	6	3	3	12	11	+1	Qualification to Winners' Group play-off
5	Mark Allen (NIR)	6	3	3	10	13	−3	Eliminated from the competition
6	John Higgins (SCO)	6	2	4	9	12	−3	Eliminated from the competition
7	Barry Hawkins (ENG)	6	2	4	9	14	−5	Eliminated from the competition

=== Play-offs ===
Semi-finals; Best of 5 frames
1	Ali Carter (ENG)	3
4	Marco Fu (HKG)	0
2	Ding Junhui (CHN)	0
3	Martin Gould (ENG)	3

Final; Best of 5 frames
1	Ali Carter (ENG)	2
3	Martin Gould (ENG)	3

== Century breaks ==
Total: 89

- **146** (4), 128, 118, 109, 109, 109, 109, 103 – Stephen Maguire
- **143** (W), 141, 139, 134, 128, 122, 120, 103, 101 – Ding Junhui
- **140** (7), 137, 134, 130, 129, 112, 107, 103, 101 – Marco Fu
- 140, **137** (3), 132, 122, 103 – Mark Selby
- **140** (1), 117, 112, 103, 102, 102 – Ali Carter
- **139** (5), 139, **137** (3), **133** (2), 125, 119, 113, 101, 100, 100, 100 – Martin Gould
- **137** (3), 136, 122, 113, 112, 110 – Judd Trump
- **137** (6), 133, 104, 101 – Ryan Day
- **133** (2), 114, 113, 109 – Neil Robertson
- 133, 102 – Joe Perry
- 131, 126, 103, 102 – John Higgins
- 130, 127, 114, 107 – Ricky Walden
- 130, 118, 114, 104, 101 – Shaun Murphy
- 129, 124, 119, 105, 100 – Barry Hawkins
- 129 – Andrew Higginson
- 126, 125, 113, 109, 109, 106, 100 – Mark Allen
- 122 – Stuart Bingham
- 107 – Mark Davis
- 102 – Matthew Stevens

Bold: highest break in the indicated group.

== Winnings ==
No.	Player	1	2	3	4	5	6	7	W	TOTAL
1	Martin Gould (ENG)	2,500	**4,550**	**1,267**	1,900	**6,500**			14,400	31,117
2	Stephen Maguire (SCO)		2,700	2,900	**5,200**	4,900	4,500	4,400		24,600
3	Ali Carter (ENG)	**5,000**	6,500						9,300	20,800
4	Marco Fu (HKG)						2,700	**6,800**	5,400	14,900
5	Ding Junhui (CHN)			5,900					**6,800**	12,700
6	Barry Hawkins (ENG)				1,200	2,900	6,200		1,800	12,100
7	Mark Allen (NIR)				6,600				2,000	8,600
8	Judd Trump (ENG)	1,000	1,200	**4,967**	1,100					8,267
9	John Higgins (SCO)	6,300							1,800	8,100
10	Ricky Walden (ENG)				2,700	2,100	1,000			5,800
11	Ryan Day (WAL)					1,000	**2,700**	1,000		4,700
12	Mark Davis (ENG)	3,100	1,000							4,100
13	Mark Selby (ENG)			**2,967**	900					3,867
14	Neil Robertson (AUS)		**2,850**	1,000						3,850
15	Andrew Higginson (ENG)							2,700		2,700
16	Dominic Dale (WAL)						1,200	1,200		2,400
17	Robert Milkins (ENG)							2,200		2,200
18	Joe Perry (ENG)					1,200				1,200
19	Stuart Bingham (ENG)		900							900
=	Mark Williams (WAL)			900						900
21	Shaun Murphy (ENG)	800								800
=	Tom Ford (ENG)							800		800
23	Matthew Stevens (WAL)	700								700
=	Marcus Campbell (SCO)						700			700
25	Peter Ebdon (ENG)					400				400
	Total prize money	19,400	19,700	19,900	19,600	19,000	19,000	19,100	41,500	177,200

Green: Won the group. Bold: Highest break in the group. All prize money in GBP.
