= 1991 Kent Cup =

Snooker tournament

Tournament information
- Dates: 21–24 March 1991
- Venue: Yuetan Stadium
- City: Beijing
- Country: China
- Organisation: Pro-Tex Sports Management
- Format: Non-ranking event
- Winner's share: £5,000

Final
- Champion: Joe Swail (NIR)
- Runner-up: Marcus Campbell (SCO)
- Score: 5–0

The 1991 Kent Cup was an invitational non-ranking snooker tournament held at the Yuetan Stadium in Beijing from 21 to 24 March 1991. Joe Swail won the event, defeating Marcus Campbell 5–0 in the final, and received £5,000 prize money.

== Main draw ==
Group matches were decided on the aggregate score across two frames. The scores in points are shown. Players in bold denote match winners.

Group A

Player	Score	Player
**Marcus Campbell (SCO)**	**117**–58	Li Yuanhai (CHN)
**Marcus Campbell (SCO)**	**125**–97	Bjorn L'Orange (NOR)
**Bjorn L'Orange (NOR)**	**121**–91	Li Yuanhai (CHN)

Group B
Each player won one match. Leung qualified as the player that made the highest break in the group.

Player	Score	Player
**Stanley Leung (HKG)**	**113**–65	Steve Lemmens (BEL)
**Steve Lemmens (BEL)**	**119**–84	Udon Khaimuk (THA)
**Udon Khaimuk (THA)**	**134**–94	Stanley Leung (HKG)

Group C

Player	Score	Player
**Stephen O'Connor (IRE)**	**121**–91	Jiang Yingyi (CHN)
**Chuchart Trairatanapradit (THA)**	**163**–76	Stephen O'Connor (IRE)
**Chuchart Trairatanapradit (THA)**	**192**–21	Jiang Yingyi (CHN)

Group D

Player	Score	Player
**Joe Swail (NIR)**	**152**–72	David Yao (HKG)
**Joe Swail (NIR)**	**127**–98	Michael Colquitt (IOM)
**David Yao (HKG)**	**144**–88	Michael Colquitt (IOM)

Knockout

**Semi-finals**; Best of 5 frames
**Marcus Campbell (SCO)**	**3**
Stanley Leung (HKG)	2
**Joe Swail (NIR)**	**3**
Chuchart Trairatanapradit (THA)	2

**Final**; Best of 9 frames
Marcus Campbell (SCO)	0
**Joe Swail (NIR)**	**5**
