= Kent Cup (snooker) =

Tournament information
- Location: Beijing
- Country: China
- Established: 1987
- Organisation(s): Matchroom Sport; Framework; WPBSA
- Format: Non-ranking event
- Final year: 1992
- Final champion: (England) John Parrott

The Kent Cup was an invitational non-ranking snooker tournament staged on six occasions from 1987 to 1992.

== History ==
The Kent Cup followed the China Masters which had been the first professional snooker tournament in China and had been held the previous two seasons. Willie Thorne won the inaugural tournament, defeating Jimmy White in the final in front of 100 million viewers in China. By the following season the viewership had doubled to 200 million, with the 1988 edition seeing John Parrott win his maiden professional title with a victory over Martin Clark. The next edition saw a significant reduction in prize fund. Sakchai Sim-Ngam won the tournament, which was held exclusively for the players from the Asia-Pacific region. The 1990 edition saw the return of lower-ranked professionals from United Kingdom. Marcus Campbell won the tournament to collect his first professional title. Campbell returned to defend his title in 1991, but was defeated in the final by Joe Swail.

The following year the tournament was re-branded as the Kent Classic and the top professionals returned with an increased prize fund. John Parrott defeated Stephen Hendry in the final edition of the tournament.

== Winners ==
Year	Winner	Runner-up	Final score	Season
Kent Cup
1987	(England) Willie Thorne	(England) Jimmy White	5–2	1986/87
1988	(England) John Parrott	(England) Martin Clark	5–1	1987/88
1989	(Thailand) Sakchai Sim-Ngam	(Hong Kong) Franky Chan	4–1	1988/89
1990	(Scotland) Marcus Campbell	(Canada) Tom Finstad	4–1	1989/90
1991	(Northern Ireland) Joe Swail	(Scotland) Marcus Campbell	5–0	1990/91
Kent Classic
1992	(England) John Parrott	(Scotland) Stephen Hendry	6–5	1992/93
