= Sakchai Sim Ngam =

Thai snooker player

Personal information
- Born: 12 July 1952

Sport
- Country: Thailand
- Sport: Snooker
- Professional: 1985–1987
- Highest ranking: 80 (1986–87)
- Best ranking finish: Last 32 (1995 Thailand Open)

Sakchai Sim Ngam (Thai: ศักดิ์ชัย ซิมงาม; born 12 July 1952) is a Thai former professional snooker player. He won the IBSF World Snooker Championship in 1995.

== Career ==
A former kickboxer, Sim Ngam won the 1984 ACBS Asian Snooker Championship with an 8–5 defeat of Vichien Sangthong in the final. The following year, he reached the final again but lost 5–8 to Gary Kwok.

Sim Ngam was accepted as a professional by the World Professional Billiards and Snooker Association (WPBSA) in 1985, becoming the first Thai professional player. His first professional match resulted in a 5–2 win against David Greaves in the first qualifying round 1985 Matchroom Trophy, before he was defeated 4–5 by Les Dodd in the following round. In his next tournament, the 1985 Grand Prix, he recorded 5–3 wins over both Derek Mienie and Fred Davis to reach the third qualifying round, where he was eliminated 1–5 by Eugene Hughes. He also reached the third qualifying round of the 1985 UK Championship, losing 4–9 to Joe Johnson after defeating Roger Bales and Mick Fisher. He never progressed further in a professional tournament than he did in these events.

He was part of the Rest of the World Team for the 1986 World Cup that was eliminated after losing 0–5 to Canada in their first match. Sim Ngam played one frame, which he lost 6–102 to Bill Werbeniuk. In the qualifying rounds for the 1986 World Snooker Championship, Sim Ngam whitewashed Bernard Bennett 10–0 before losing in the deciding frame to Paul Medati, 9–10.

Sim Ngam resigned his membership of WPBSA in 1987, when ranked 80th, and did not play in any professional events again until he was a wild card entrant to the 1995 Thailand Open, 1996 Thailand Open, and 1996 Asian Classic. His highest snooker world ranking was 80.

He won the amateur 1995 IBSF World Snooker Championship, defeating David Lilley 11–7 after trailing 5–7 at the end of the first day of the final. As defending champion at the 1996 IBSF World Snooker Championship, he was 2–4 behind Stan Gorski in the last 16 round, but then equalised at 4–4 after needing Gorski to concede points from two fouls in the eighth frame. Gorski made a break of 51 in the deciding frame and won the match 5–4.

== Performance and rankings timeline ==
Tournament	1984/ 85	1985/ 86	1986/ 87	1988/ 89	1989/ 90	1994/ 95	1995/ 96	1996/ 97
Ranking (Note: It shows the ranking at the beginning of the season)	(Note: He was an amateur)	(Note: New players on the Main Tour don't have a ranking)	80					
Ranking tournaments
Asian Classic (Note: The event was called the Dubai Masters (1988/1989), the Dubai Classic (1989/1990 and 1994/1995) and the Thailand Classic (1995/1996))	Not Held			NR	A	A	A	WR
Grand Prix	A	LQ	WD	A	A	A	A	A
UK Championship	A	1R	WD	A	A	A	A	A
International Open (Note: The event was called the Matchroom Trophy (1985/1986))	A	LQ	WD	A	A	A	A	A
Thailand Open	Non-Ranking Event			NH	A	1R	WR	A
British Open	A	LQ	WD	A	A	A	A	A
World Championship	A	LQ	WD	A	A	A	A	A
Former ranking tournaments
Classic	A	LQ	WD	A	A	Not Held		
Former non-ranking tournaments
Thailand Masters	RR	RR	SF	NH	Ranking Event			
Kent Cup	Not Held		A	W	SF	Not Held		

Performance Table Legend
LQ	lost in the qualifying draw	#R	lost in the early rounds of the tournament (WR = Wildcard round, RR = Round robin)	QF	lost in the quarter-finals
SF	lost in the semi-finals	F	lost in the final	W	won the tournament
DNQ	did not qualify for the tournament	A	did not participate in the tournament	WD	withdrew from the tournament

NH / Not Held	means an event was not held
NR / Non-Ranking Event	means an event is/was no longer a ranking event
R / Ranking Event	means an event is/was a ranking event
MR / Minor-Ranking Event	means an event is/was a minor-ranking event

== Career finals ==
=== Non-ranking finals: 4 (2 titles) ===
Outcome	No.	Year	Championship	Opponent in the final	Score	Ref.
Runner-up	1.	1987	Kent Challenge	Udon Khaimuk (THA)	1–3	
Winner	1.	1987	Indonesian Games	Benjamin Lui (SIN)	8–6	
Winner	2.	1989	Kent Cup	Franky Chan (HKG)	4–1	
Runner-up	2.	1989	Kent Challenge (2)	Kenny Kwok (HKG)	1–3	

=== Amateur finals: 4 (3 titles) ===
Outcome	No.	Year	Championship	Opponent in the final	Score	Ref.
Winner	1.	1984	ACBS Asian Snooker Championship	Vichien Sangthong (THA)	8–5	
Runner-up	1.	1985	ACBS Asian Snooker Championship	Gary Kwok (HKG)	5–8	
Winner	2.	1995	IBSF World Snooker Championship	David Lilley (ENG)	11–7	
Winner	3.	1997	Thailand Amateur Championship	Praprut Chaithanasakun (THA)	8–6	
