= 1992 Kent Classic =

Invitational snooker tournament

Kent Classic
Tournament information
- Dates: 26–30 August 1992
- Venue: Haidian Stadium, Beijing
- Country: China
- Format: Non-ranking event
- Total prize fund: £100,000
- Winner's share: £25,000

Final
- Champion: John Parrott (ENG)
- Runner-up: Stephen Hendry (SCO)
- Score: 6–5

The 1992 Kent Classic was a professional non-ranking snooker tournament that took place between 26 and 30 August 1992 at the Hiadian Stadium in Beijing, China. John Parrott won the title, defeating Stephen Hendry 6–5 in the final, and received £25,000 prize money from a total prize fund of £100,000.

== Results ==
First round Best-of-7 frames
Stephen Hendry (SCO)	4
Cen Wai An (CHN)	0
Dennis Taylor (NIR)	4
Gary Wilkinson (ENG)	0
Neal Foulds (ENG)	1
Rom Surin (THA) (Note: also known as Prapruet Chaithanasakul)	4
Steve Davis (ENG)	4
Gou Hua (CHN)	2
Jimmy White (ENG)	4
Zhang Kai (CHN)	2
Terry Griffiths (WAL)	4
Kenny Kwok (HKG)	3
James Wattana (THA)	4
Willie Thorne (ENG)	1
John Parrott (ENG)	4
Lao Yong Qiang (CHN)	1

Quarter-finals; Best-of-9 frames
(Scotland) Stephen Hendry	5
(Northern Ireland) Dennis Taylor	2
(Thailand) Rom Surin	4
(England) Steve Davis	5
(England) Jimmy White	3
(Wales) Terry Griffiths	5
(Thailand) James Wattana	4
(England) John Parrott	5

Semi-finals; Best-of-9 frames
(Scotland) Stephen Hendry	5
(England) Steve Davis	3
(Wales) Terry Griffiths	4
(England) John Parrott	5

Final; Best-of-11 frames
(Scotland) Stephen Hendry	5
(England) John Parrott	6
