= Marcus Campbell =

Scottish snooker player

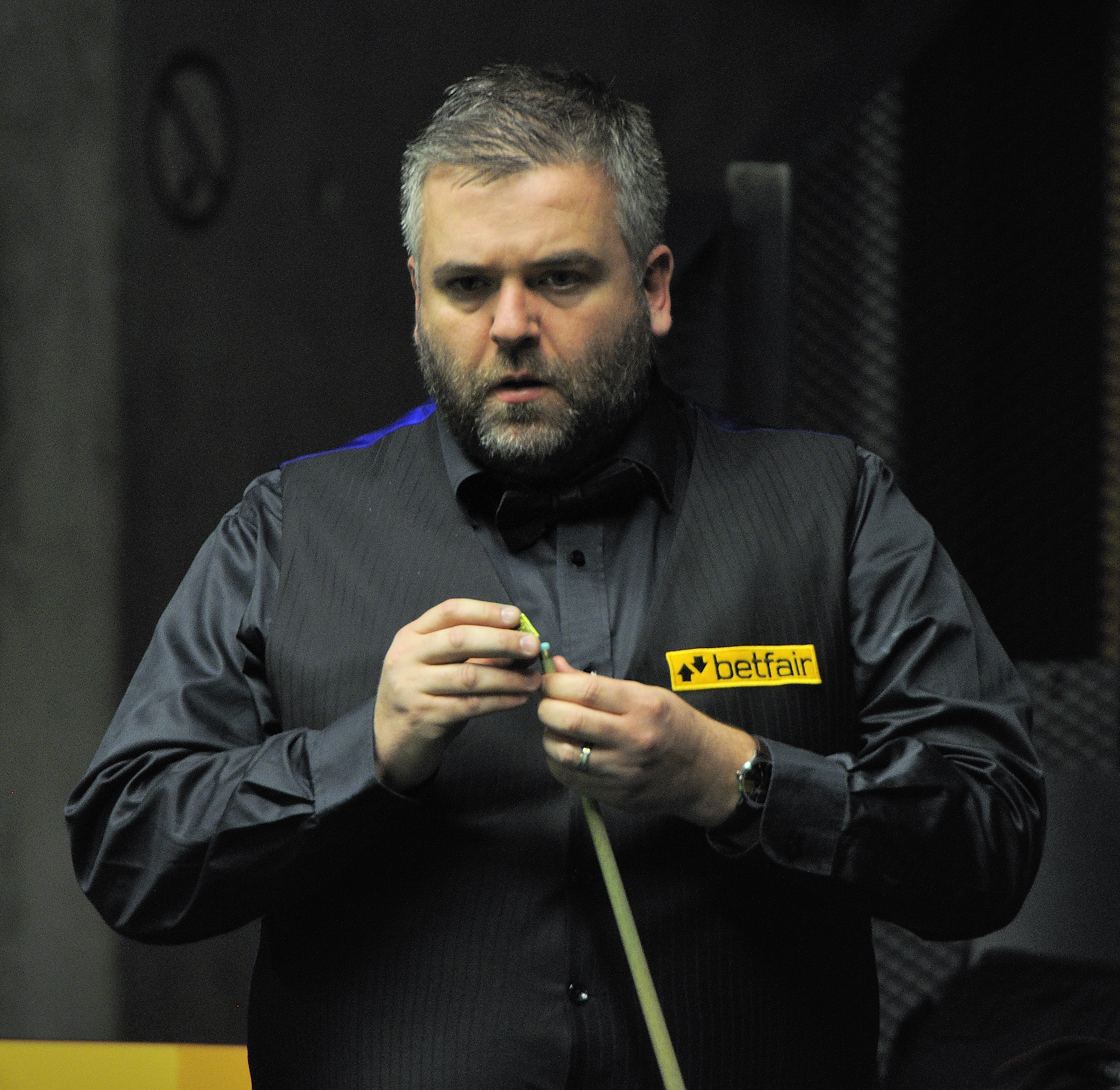
- Campbell at the 2013 German Masters

Personal information
- Nickname: The Dumbarton Destroyer
- Born: 22 September 1972 (age 54) Dumbarton, Scotland

Sport
- Country: Scotland
- Sport: Snooker
- Professional: 1991–2015
- Highest ranking: 20 (April–May 2012)
- Maximum breaks: 1
- Best ranking finish: Semi-final (x1)

Tournament wins
- Minor-ranking: 1

Marcus Campbell (born 22 September 1972) is a Scottish former professional snooker player. He was ranked within the world's top 64 for 15 consecutive seasons.

== Career ==
Campbell is most famous for whitewashing Stephen Hendry 9–0 in the 1998 Liverpool Victoria UK Championship, one of the most surprising results in snooker's history. He followed this win with a 9–6 win over Quinten Hann in the last 32.

He started the 2007/2008 season strongly by reaching the last 16 of the Grand Prix, coming through the qualifiers and beating players like Graeme Dott and Anthony Hamilton before his run ended in a 5–2 defeat to Joe Swail. He also reached the last 32 of the Welsh Open where he beat Lee Spick, Ricky Walden and Gerard Greene and gave Ding Junhui a run for his money before Ding eventually won 5–4. He qualified for the 2008 Bahrain Championship before scoring a 147 in his wildcard match against Ahmed Basheer Al-Khusaibi. He lost to eventual champion Neil Robertson in the last 32. He then qualified for the 2010 World Championship, where he lost 10–5 to Mark Williams.

Campbell won the first professional tournament of his career in Germany when he won Event 3 of the Euro Players Tour Championship beating Liang Wenbo 4–0 in the final. This result along with other consistent performances were enough to see him enter the top 32 in the rankings. He also qualified for the world championship for the second successive year, where he played Shaun Murphy. He subsequently lost 10–1 to Murphy.

In the 2011–12 season Campbell qualified for six of the eight ranking events. His best results of the season were last 16 exits at the Australian Goldfields Open, where he lost 1–5 to Mark Allen, and at the World Open, thanks to Ali Carter withdrawing from the event, before being defeated by Graeme Dott 3–5. He played former champion Matthew Stevens in the first round of the UK Championship, despite the death of a close friend just a few hours before. Stevens won the match 6–2. Campbell played in all 12 of the PTC events, making two quarter-finals in Event 1 and Event 3, to finish 30th in the Order of Merit, just out of the top 24 who made the Finals. Campbell played Liang Wenbo in the final qualifying round for the World Championship and produced two comebacks in the match having trailed 2–8 and 5–9 to level at 9–9, before the match was delayed to let the evening session's order of play begin. Liang had time to compose himself and won the decider to end Campbell's season, which he finished ranked world number 25.

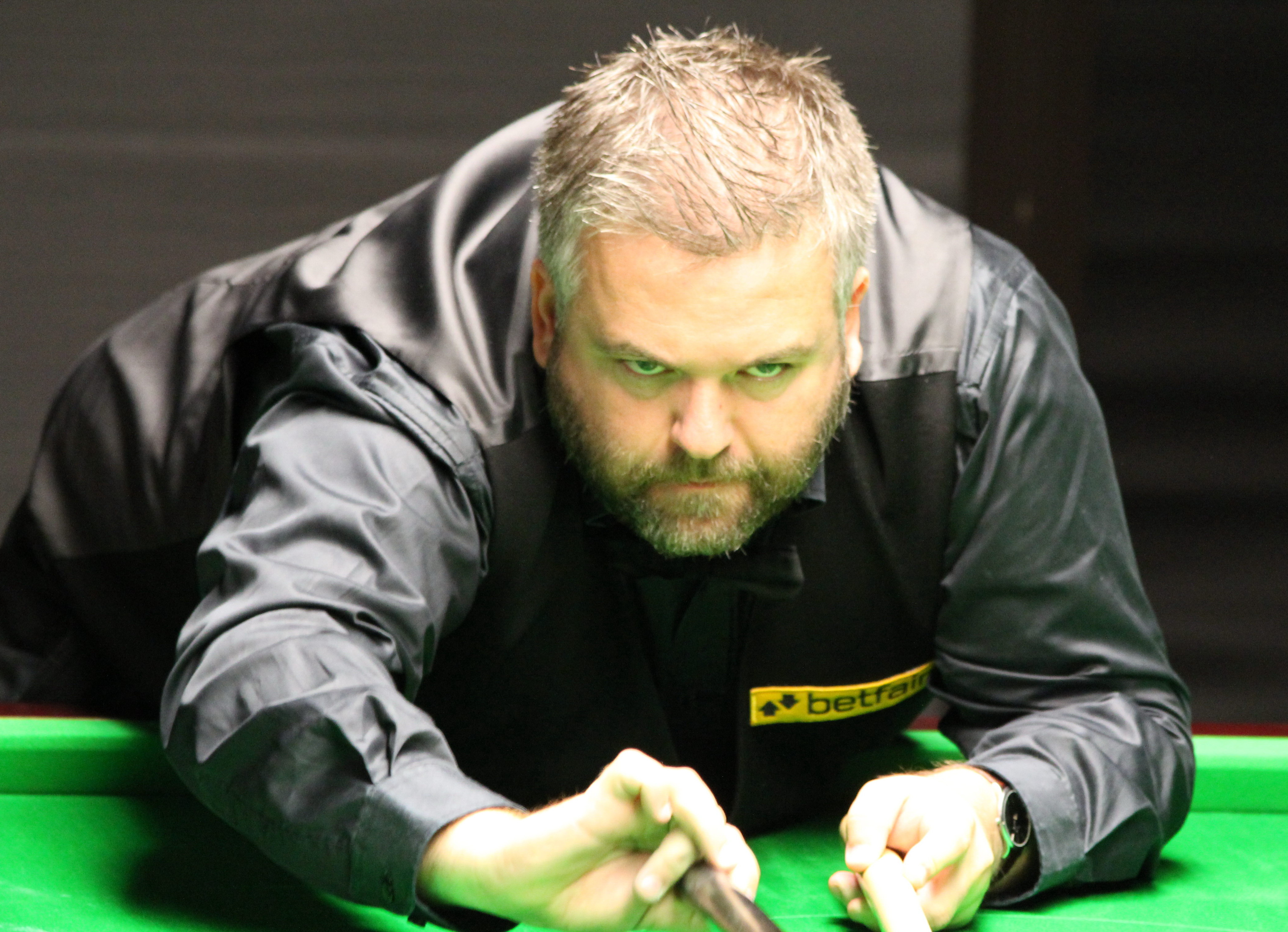
Campbell at the 2012 Paul Hunter Classic

The 2012–13 season began very well for Campbell as he qualified for the Wuxi Classic, where he reached the first ranking event semi-final of his 21-year professional career. He dispatched Stephen Lee, Fergal O'Brien and Mark Williams to play Ricky Walden in the semis. He lost the match 1–6 and stated afterwards that he "didn't feel comfortable at all" and put it down to nerves. However, he also felt that winning a ranking tournament was now within his reach. He qualified for four of the next seven ranking events, but lost in the first round on each occasion. He had his best run of the season since Wuxi at the China Open where he overcame Peter Ebdon 5–3 and Graeme Dott 5–4 to make the quarter-finals. There, Campbell lost 2–5 to Neil Robertson. Campbell qualified for the World Championship with a 10–4 victory against Liam Highfield and played defending champion Ronnie O'Sullivan in the first round, who had taken a year away from snooker since lifting the title 12 months previously. Campbell missed opportunities in the first session to finish it 2–7 behind and went on to lose 4–10. Campbell was ranked world number 28 at the end of the season.

Campbell lost in the first round to local favourites in the first two ranking events he qualified for in the 2013–14 season. In the Australian Goldfields Open it was Neil Robertson who eliminated him 5–1 and at the Indian Open he lost 4–1 to Pankaj Advani. At the UK Championship Campbell saw off Lü Haotian and Michael White, but was then beaten 6–2 by Ronnie O'Sullivan. Campbell could not advance beyond the first round in any of the remaining ranking events and suffered a surprise 10–4 defeat to Alex Borg in World Championship qualifying, a player who had until then only won three matches all season.

Campbell was thrashed 5–0 by Ricky Walden in the first round of the Australian Goldfields Open. This proved to be his only last 32 showing in any event this season and, after he failed to progress past the last 32 of either of the two Q School events, he dropped off the tour as he was the world number 68, just outside the top 64 who remain. He has not played in an event since.

== Performance and rankings timeline ==
Tournament	1991/ 92	1992/ 93	1993/ 94	1994/ 95	1995/ 96	1996/ 97	1997/ 98	1998/ 99	1999/ 00	2000/ 01	2001/ 02	2002/ 03	2003/ 04	2004/ 05	2005/ 06	2006/ 07	2007/ 08	2008/ 09	2009/ 10	2010/ 11	2011/ 12	2012/ 13	2013/ 14	2014/ 15
Ranking (Note: From the 2010/2011 season it shows the ranking at the beginning of the season.)	(Note: New players on the Main Tour don't have a ranking.)	245	186	137	116	85	97	73	48	47	41	41	56	63	52	48	52	42	45	40	24	25	28	35
Ranking tournaments
Wuxi Classic (Note: The event was called the Jiangsu Classic (2008/2009–2009/2010))	Tournament Not Held																	Non-Ranking Event				SF	LQ	1R
Australian Goldfields Open (Note: The event was called the Australian Open (1994/1995) and the Australian Masters (1995/1996))	Not Held			NR		Tournament Not Held															2R	1R	1R	1R
Shanghai Masters	Tournament Not Held																LQ	LQ	1R	LQ	LQ	1R	LQ	LQ
International Championship	Tournament Not Held																					LQ	LQ	LQ
UK Championship	LQ	LQ	LQ	LQ	LQ	2R	1R	3R	LQ	LQ	LQ	LQ	LQ	1R	LQ	1R	LQ	LQ	LQ	LQ	1R	LQ	3R	2R
German Masters (Note: The event was called the German Open (1995/1996–1997/1998))	Tournament Not Held				LQ	LQ	LQ	NR	Tournament Not Held											LQ	1R	1R	1R	LQ
Welsh Open	LQ	LQ	LQ	LQ	LQ	LQ	1R	LQ	LQ	LQ	LQ	LQ	2R	LQ	LQ	LQ	2R	LQ	1R	1R	LQ	LQ	1R	2R
Indian Open	Tournament Not Held																						1R	1R
Players Tour Championship Finals (Note: The event was called the Players Tour Championship Grand Finals (2010/2011–2012/2013))	Tournament Not Held																			QF	DNQ	DNQ	DNQ	DNQ
China Open (Note: The event was called the China International (1997/1998–1998/1999))	Tournament Not Held						NR	LQ	LQ	1R	LQ	Not Held		LQ	LQ	LQ	2R	LQ	LQ	2R	1R	QF	LQ	1R
World Championship	LQ	LQ	LQ	LQ	LQ	LQ	LQ	LQ	LQ	1R	LQ	LQ	LQ	LQ	LQ	LQ	LQ	LQ	1R	1R	LQ	1R	LQ	LQ
Non-ranking tournaments
Six-red World Championship (Note: The event was called the Six-red Snooker International (2008/2009) and the Six-red World Grand Prix (2009/2010))	Tournament Not Held																	A	A	A	NH	RR	A	A
The Masters	LQ	LQ	LQ	LQ	LQ	LQ	LQ	LQ	LQ	LQ	LQ	LQ	A	LQ	LQ	A	A	A	A	A	A	A	A	A
Championship League	Tournament Not Held																A	A	A	A	RR	RR	RR	A
World Seniors Championship	A	Tournament Not Held																		A	A	A	A	LQ
Shoot-Out	Tournament Not Held																			SF	2R	2R	1R	1R
Former ranking tournaments
Classic	LQ	Tournament Not Held																						
Strachan Open (Note: The event was called the Strachan Challenge (1992/1993–1993/1994))	LQ	MR	NR	Tournament Not Held																				
Pakistan Masters	Tournament Not Held				QF	Tournament Not Held																		
Dubai Classic (Note: The event was called the Thailand Classic (1995/1996) and the Asian Classic (1996/1997))	LQ	LQ	LQ	LQ	LQ	LQ	Tournament Not Held																	
Malta Grand Prix	Not Held			Non-Ranking Event					LQ	NR	Tournament Not Held													
Thailand Masters (Note: The event was called the Asian Open (1991/1992–1992/1993) and the Thailand Open (1993/1994–1996/1997))	LQ	LQ	LQ	LQ	LQ	LQ	LQ	LQ	LQ	LQ	LQ	NR	Not Held			NR	Tournament Not Held							
Scottish Open (Note: The event was called the International Open (1992/1993–1996/1997) and the Players Championship (2003/2004))	NH	LQ	LQ	LQ	2R	LQ	QF	2R	3R	LQ	LQ	LQ	LQ	Tournament Not Held								MR	Not Held	
British Open	LQ	LQ	LQ	LQ	LQ	1R	LQ	2R	LQ	LQ	LQ	LQ	LQ	LQ	Tournament Not Held									
Irish Masters	Non-Ranking Event											LQ	LQ	LQ	NH	NR	Tournament Not Held							
European Masters (Note: The event was called the Irish Open (1998/1999) and Malta Cup (2004/2005–2007/2008))	LQ	LQ	LQ	LQ	1R	LQ	NH	LQ	Not Held		LQ	LQ	LQ	LQ	LQ	1R	NR	Tournament Not Held						
Northern Ireland Trophy	Tournament Not Held														NR	LQ	LQ	1R	Tournament Not Held					
Bahrain Championship	Tournament Not Held																	1R	Tournament Not Held					
World Open (Note: The event was called the Grand Prix (1991/1992–2000/2001 and 2004/2005–2009/2010), the LG Cup (2001/2002–2003/2004) and the Haikou World Open (2011/2012–2013/2014))	LQ	LQ	2R	LQ	LQ	LQ	LQ	LQ	3R	1R	1R	1R	LQ	2R	LQ	LQ	2R	LQ	1R	2R	2R	1R	LQ	NH
Former non-ranking tournaments
Scottish Masters	A	A	A	A	A	A	A	A	LQ	A	A	A	Tournament Not Held											
Scottish Professional Championship	Tournament Not Held																			1R	Tournament Not Held			

Performance Table Legend
LQ	lost in the qualifying draw	#R	lost in the early rounds of the tournament (WR = Wildcard round, RR = Round robin)	QF	lost in the quarter-finals
SF	lost in the semi-finals	F	lost in the final	W	won the tournament
DNQ	did not qualify for the tournament	A	did not participate in the tournament	WD	withdrew from the tournament
DQ	disqualified from the tournament				

NH / Not Held	event was not held.
NR / Non-Ranking Event	event is/was no longer a ranking event.
R / Ranking Event	event is/was a ranking event.
MR / Minor-Ranking Event	means an event is/was a minor-ranking event.
PA / Pro-am Event	means an event is/was a pro-am event.

== Career finals ==
=== Minor-ranking finals: 1 (1 title) ===
Outcome	No.	Year	Championship	Opponent in the final	Score
Winner	1.	2010	Rhein-Main Masters	(China) Liang Wenbo	4–0

=== Non-ranking finals: 2 (1 title) ===
Outcome	No.	Year	Championship	Opponent in the final	Score
Winner	1.	1990	Kent Cup	(Canada) Tom Finstad	4–1
Runner-up	1.	1991	Kent Cup	(Northern Ireland) Joe Swail	0–5

=== Pro-am finals: 1 ===
Outcome	No.	Year	Championship	Opponent in the final	Score
Runner-up	1.	2008	Scottish Open Snooker Championship	(Scotland) John Higgins	4−5

=== Amateur finals: 1 (1 title) ===
Outcome	No.	Year	Championship	Opponent in the final	Score
Winner	1.	1989	Scottish Amateur Championship	(Scotland) Mark Cadenhead	9–6
