= European Tour 2014/2015 – Event 3 =

European Tour 2014/2015 Event 3

Tournament information
- Dates: 1–5 October 2014
- Venue: Universiada Hall
- City: Sofia
- Country: Bulgaria
- Organisation: World Snooker
- Format: Minor-ranking event
- Total prize fund: €125,000
- Winner's share: €25,000
- Highest break: Dominic Dale (WAL) (139)

Final
- Champion: Shaun Murphy (ENG)
- Runner-up: Martin Gould (ENG)
- Score: 4–2

The European Tour 2014/2015 – Event 3 (also known as the 2014 Victoria Bulgarian Open) was a professional minor-ranking snooker tournament that took place between 1–5 October 2014 in Sofia, Bulgaria.

The tournament was meant to be Ali Carter's first since his lung cancer diagnosis and subsequent chemotherapy treatment, but he was forced to withdraw due to acute pain in his left arm following his radiofrequency ablation surgery.

John Higgins was the defending champion, but he lost 1–4 against Judd Trump in the last 64.

Shaun Murphy won his fifteenth professional title by defeating Martin Gould 4–2 in the final.

== Prize fund ==
The breakdown of prize money of the event is shown below:

| | Prize fund |
|---|---|
| Winner | €25,000 |
| Runner-up | €12,000 |
| Semi-finalist | €6,000 |
| Quarter-finalist | €4,000 |
| Last 16 | €2,300 |
| Last 32 | €1,200 |
| Last 64 | €700 |
| Total | €125,000 |

== Main draw ==
=== Preliminary rounds ===
==== Round 1 ====
Best of 7 frames

| (Bulgaria) Vasil Todorov | 0–4 | (England) Martin O'Donnell |
| (Bulgaria) Iveilo Pekov | n/s–w/o | (Wales) Alex Taubman |
| (Bulgaria) Sashko Dimitrov | 0–4 | (England) Richard Beckham |
| (Bulgaria) Teodor Chomovski | 4–0 | (Bulgaria) Veselin Lazarov |

| (Bulgaria) Bratislav Krustev | 4–3 | (Ukraine) Sergiy Isayenko |
| (England) Chris Jones | 4–1 | Chris Bryant |
| (Bulgaria) Nikolai Hristov | 0–4 | (England) Paul Davison |

==== Round 2 ====
Best of 7 frames

| (Belgium) Jeff Jacobs | 4–2 | (Scotland) Mark Owens |
| (Norway) Kjetil Hårtveit | 2–4 | (Bulgaria) Stanislav Hadjipopov |
| (Bulgaria) Ivan Kyupov | 1–4 | (England) Martin O'Donnell |
| (Serbia) Marko Vukovic | 0–4 | (Wales) Alex Taubman |
| (England) Sam Harvey | 4–0 | (Bulgaria) Julian Petrov |
| (England) Adam Bobat | 3–4 | (England) Joe O'Connor |
| (England) Christopher Keogan | 4–0 | (Scotland) David Frew |
| (Bulgaria) Georgi Velichkov | 1–4 | (England) Richard Beckham |
| (Belgium) Hans Blanckaert | 1–4 | (Republic of Ireland) Josh Boileau |
| (Belgium) Kristof Vermeiren | 4–3 | (Wales) Jack Bradford |
| (England) Sydney Wilson | 4–0 | (Russia) Karen Osipov |
| (Bulgaria) Damail Tugov | 1–4 | (Bulgaria) Spasian Spasov |
| (England) Simon Dent | 4–0 | (Romania) Corina Maracine |
| (England) Matthew Day | 4–1 | (Scotland) Rhys Clark |
| (Sweden) Farhan Mirza | 0–4 | (Republic of Ireland) Thomas Dowling |
| (England) Reanne Evans | 4–3 | (Bulgaria) Nikola Kemilev |
| (Northern Ireland) Billy Brown | 3–4 | (England) Ryan Causton |
| (Belgium) Tomasz Skalski | 4–1 | (Wales) Daniel Wells |
| (England) Joe Steele | 2–4 | (England) Mitchell Travis |
| (England) Peter Devlin | 4–0 | (England) Matthew Hulatt |
| (Malta) Brian Cini | 4–1 | (England) Matthew Glasby |
| (England) Ashley Hugill | 4–0 | (Bulgaria) Krasimir Kameshev |
| (Scotland) Marc Davis | 4–1 | (England) Jonathan Mabey |
| (England) Adam Duffy | 4–0 | (Bulgaria) Stefan Simeonovski |

| (Wales) Gareth Allen | 4–0 | (England) Mark Vincent |
| (Bulgaria) Ivaylo Hristov | 0–4 | (Scotland) Michael Collumb |
| (England) Jeff Cundy | 4–0 | (Bulgaria) Teodor Chomovski |
| (Scotland) Dylan Craig | 4–1 | (England) Josh Mulholland |
| (England) John Chapman | 0–4 | (England) Oliver Brown |
| (England) Jake Nicholson | 3–4 | (England) Nico Elton |
| (Northern Ireland) Declan Brennan | 3–4 | (England) Zack Richardson |
| (Poland) Kacper Filipiak | w/o–w/d | (Poland) Michal Zielinski |
| (England) Sanderson Lam | 4–0 | (Bulgaria) Bratislav Krustev |
| (England) Sean O'Sullivan | 4–1 | (Wales) Kishan Hirani |
| (England) Anthony Jeffers | 3–4 | (Wales) Ben Jones |
| (Republic of Ireland) John Sutton | 2–4 | (England) Luke Garland |
| (Scotland) Eden Sharav | 4–3 | (England) Chris Jones |
| (Pakistan) Arshad Qureshi | w/d–w/o | (Germany) Daniel Schneider |
| (Bulgaria) Hristo Sirakov | 3–4 | (Northern Ireland) Conor McCormack |
| (Bulgaria) Luchezar Gergov | 0–4 | (Poland) Grzegorz Biernadski |
| (Wales) Andrew Rogers | 2–4 | (England) Paul Davison |
| (England) Joshua Baddeley | 4–0 | (England) Jayson Wholey |
| (England) Kobi Mates | 0–4 | (Belgium) Jurian Heusdens |
| (England) William Lemons | 3–4 | (England) Brandon Sargeant |
| (Austria) Andreas Ploner | 1–4 | (Germany) Lukas Kleckers |
| (England) Michael Williams | 4–0 | (Bulgaria) Viktor Iliev |
| (Wales) Jamie Clarke | 3–4 | (England) Ashley Carty |
| (England) John Parkin | 4–0 | (Russia) Aleksandr Kurgankov |

==== Round 3 ====
Best of 7 frames

| (Belgium) Jeff Jacobs | 4–0 | (Bulgaria) Stanislav Hadjipopov |
| (England) Martin O'Donnell | 3–4 | (Wales) Alex Taubman |
| (England) Sam Harvey | 4–3 | (England) Joe O'Connor |
| (England) Christopher Keogan | 4–1 | (England) Richard Beckham |
| (Republic of Ireland) Josh Boileau | 4–0 | (Belgium) Kristof Vermeiren |
| (England) Sydney Wilson | 4–0 | (Bulgaria) Spasian Spasov |
| (England) Simon Dent | 1–4 | (England) Matthew Day |
| (Republic of Ireland) Thomas Dowling | 4–3 | (England) Reanne Evans |
| (England) Ryan Causton | 3–4 | (Belgium) Tomasz Skalski |
| (England) Mitchell Travis | 4–0 | (England) Peter Devlin |
| (Malta) Brian Cini | 3–4 | (England) Ashley Hugill |
| (Scotland) Marc Davis | 2–4 | (England) Adam Duffy |

| (Wales) Gareth Allen | 4–0 | (Scotland) Michael Collumb |
| (England) Jeff Cundy | 4–3 | (Scotland) Dylan Craig |
| (England) Oliver Brown | 2–4 | (England) Nico Elton |
| (England) Zack Richardson | 3–4 | (Poland) Kacper Filipiak |
| (England) Sanderson Lam | 4–0 | (England) Sean O'Sullivan |
| (Wales) Ben Jones | 4–2 | (England) Luke Garland |
| (Scotland) Eden Sharav | 4–0 | (Germany) Daniel Schneider |
| (Northern Ireland) Conor McCormack | 1–4 | (Poland) Grzegorz Biernadski |
| (England) Paul Davison | 4–3 | (England) Joshua Baddeley |
| (Belgium) Jurian Heusdens | 1–4 | (England) Brandon Sargeant |
| (Germany) Lukas Kleckers | 3–4 | (England) Michael Williams |
| (England) Ashley Carty | 4–2 | (England) John Parkin |

=== Main rounds ===
==== Top half ====
===== Section 1 =====
Last 128; Best of 7 frames
(England) Mark Selby | 4
(England) Barry Pinches | 3
(Northern Ireland) Joe Swail | 4
(Belgium) Jeff Jacobs | 1
(England) Nigel Bond | 4
(England) Peter Lines | 0
(Scotland) Fraser Patrick | 4
(Wales) Alex Taubman | 0
(England) Matthew Selt | 4
(England) Sam Harvey | 2
(England) David Gilbert | 3
(England) Mitchell Mann | 4
(England) Robbie Williams | 4
(England) Hammad Miah | 3
(England) Robert Milkins | 4
(England) Christopher Keogan | 2

Last 64; Best of 7 frames
(England) Mark Selby | 4
(Northern Ireland) Joe Swail | 2
(England) Nigel Bond | 3
(Scotland) Fraser Patrick | 4
(England) Matthew Selt | 4
(England) Mitchell Mann | 0
(England) Robbie Williams | 4
(England) Robert Milkins | 3

Last 32; Best of 7 frames
(England) Mark Selby | 4
(Scotland) Fraser Patrick | 3
(England) Matthew Selt | 2
(England) Robbie Williams | 4

Last 16; Best of 7 frames
(England) Mark Selby | 4
(England) Robbie Williams | 2

===== Section 2 =====
Last 128; Best of 7 frames
(Scotland) Stephen Maguire | w/o
(England) Dave Harold | w/d
(England) Kyren Wilson | 4
(Republic of Ireland) Josh Boileau | 1
(Malta) Tony Drago | w/d
(England) Stuart Carrington | w/o
(England) Shaun Murphy | 4
(England) Joel Walker | 1
(England) James Cahill | w/o
(Finland) Robin Hull | w/d
(Scotland) Michael Leslie | 1
(England) Zak Surety | 4
(England) Jimmy White | 4
(England) Sydney Wilson | 1
(Thailand) Dechawat Poomjaeng | 4
(England) Matthew Day | 0

Last 64; Best of 7 frames
(Scotland) Stephen Maguire | 4
(England) Kyren Wilson | 0
(England) Stuart Carrington | 0
(England) Shaun Murphy | 4
(England) James Cahill | 4
(England) Zak Surety | 1
(England) Jimmy White | 4
(Thailand) Dechawat Poomjaeng | 2

Last 32; Best of 7 frames
(Scotland) Stephen Maguire | 2
(England) Shaun Murphy | 4
(England) James Cahill | 2
(England) Jimmy White | 4

Last 16; Best of 7 frames
(England) Shaun Murphy | 4
(England) Jimmy White | 0

===== Section 3 =====
Last 128; Best of 7 frames
(England) Rod Lawler | w/o
(England) Ali Carter | w/d
(England) Ben Woollaston | 3
(Wales) Andrew Pagett | 4
(England) Anthony Hamilton | 4
(England) Rory McLeod | 3
(Wales) Michael White | 4
(England) Ian Burns | 1
(England) Jamie Cope | 4
(Republic of Ireland) Thomas Dowling | 0
(England) Michael Holt | 4
(Belgium) Tomasz Skalski | 2
(England) Jimmy Robertson | 4
(England) Alex Davies | 2
(India) Aditya Mehta | 3
(England) Mitchell Travis | 4

Last 64; Best of 7 frames
(England) Rod Lawler | 1
(Wales) Andrew Pagett | 4
(England) Anthony Hamilton | 2
(Wales) Michael White | 4
(England) Jamie Cope | 2
(England) Michael Holt | 4
(England) Jimmy Robertson | 4
(England) Mitchell Travis | 2

Last 32; Best of 7 frames
(Wales) Andrew Pagett | 2
(Wales) Michael White | 4
(England) Michael Holt | 0
(England) Jimmy Robertson | 4

Last 16; Best of 7 frames
(Wales) Michael White | 4
(England) Jimmy Robertson | 3

===== Section 4 =====
Last 128; Best of 7 frames
(Republic of Ireland) Fergal O'Brien | 4
(Qatar) Ahmed Saif | 2
(England) Mark Joyce | 4
(England) Ryan Clark | 0
(England) Sam Baird | 4
(England) Ashley Hugill | 1
(Belgium) Luca Brecel | 4
(England) Craig Steadman | 2
(England) Liam Highfield | 4
(England) Adam Duffy | 1
(England) Mark King | 4
(Malta) Alex Borg | 2
(Thailand) Thepchaiya Un-Nooh | 3
(Norway) Kurt Maflin | 4
(Scotland) Anthony McGill | 4
(Wales) Lee Walker | 2

Last 64; Best of 7 frames
(Republic of Ireland) Fergal O'Brien | 2
(England) Mark Joyce | 4
(England) Sam Baird | 2
(Belgium) Luca Brecel | 4
(England) Liam Highfield | 1
(England) Mark King | 4
(Norway) Kurt Maflin | 1
(Scotland) Anthony McGill | 4

Last 32; Best of 7 frames
(England) Mark Joyce | 1
(Belgium) Luca Brecel | 4
(England) Mark King | 4
(Scotland) Anthony McGill | 2

Last 16; Best of 7 frames
(Belgium) Luca Brecel | 4
(England) Mark King | 1

==== Bottom half ====
===== Section 5 =====
Last 128; Best of 7 frames
(England) Ricky Walden | 4
(Wales) Gareth Allen | 2
(Wales) Ryan Day | w/o
(Scotland) Jamie Burnett | w/d
(England) Jack Lisowski | 4
(England) Jeff Cundy | 2
(Wales) Mark Williams | 1
(England) Oliver Lines | 4
(England) Stuart Bingham | 3
(England) David Grace | 4
(England) Martin Gould | 4
(Scotland) Ross Muir | 1
(Wales) Jamie Jones | 4
(Switzerland) Alexander Ursenbacher | 2
(China) Tian Pengfei | 3
(England) Andrew Higginson | 4

Last 64; Best of 7 frames
(England) Ricky Walden | 4
(Wales) Ryan Day | 3
(England) Jack Lisowski | 1
(England) Oliver Lines | 4
(England) David Grace | 1
(England) Martin Gould | 4
(Wales) Jamie Jones | 4
(England) Andrew Higginson | 3

Last 32; Best of 7 frames
(England) Ricky Walden | 4
(England) Oliver Lines | 3
(England) Martin Gould | 4
(Wales) Jamie Jones | 1

Last 16; Best of 7 frames
(England) Ricky Walden | 1
(England) Martin Gould | 4

===== Section 6 =====
Last 128; Best of 7 frames
(England) Chris Wakelin | 4
(England) Nico Elton | 2
(Thailand) Noppon Saengkham | 1
(England) Elliot Slessor | 4
(Wales) Dominic Dale | 4
(Australia) Vinnie Calabrese | 3
(England) Mark Davis | 4
(England) Michael Georgiou | 3
(England) Mike Dunn | 4
(England) Tom Ford | 3
(England) Gary Wilson | 4
(Republic of Ireland) Ken Doherty | 2
(Wales) Jak Jones | 3
(England) Alfie Burden | 4
(Scotland) Alan McManus | 4
(Poland) Kacper Filipiak | 3

Last 64; Best of 7 frames
(England) Chris Wakelin | 3
(England) Elliot Slessor | 4
(Wales) Dominic Dale | 3
(England) Mark Davis | 4
(England) Mike Dunn | 4
(England) Gary Wilson | 3
(England) Alfie Burden | 3
(Scotland) Alan McManus | 4

Last 32; Best of 7 frames
(England) Elliot Slessor | 1
(England) Mark Davis | 4
(England) Mike Dunn | 2
(Scotland) Alan McManus | 4

Last 16; Best of 7 frames
(England) Mark Davis | 4
(Scotland) Alan McManus | 1

===== Section 7 =====
Last 128; Best of 7 frames
(England) Barry Hawkins | 4
(England) Sanderson Lam | 0
(Wales) Matthew Stevens | 4
(Wales) Ben Jones | 1
(Scotland) Scott Donaldson | w/o
(Australia) Steve Mifsud | w/d
(China) Xiao Guodong | 3
(England) Joe Perry | 4
(Australia) Neil Robertson | 4
(England) Steven Hallworth | 1
(Northern Ireland) Gerard Greene | 4
(Scotland) Eden Sharav | 3
(England) Chris Melling | 4
(Poland) Grzegorz Biernadski | 2
(England) Peter Ebdon | 4
(England) Paul Davison | 1

Last 64; Best of 7 frames
(England) Barry Hawkins | 4
(Wales) Matthew Stevens | 0
(Scotland) Scott Donaldson | 3
(England) Joe Perry | 4
(Australia) Neil Robertson | 1
(Northern Ireland) Gerard Greene | 4
(England) Chris Melling | 1
(England) Peter Ebdon | 4

Last 32; Best of 7 frames
(England) Barry Hawkins | 3
(England) Joe Perry | 4
(Northern Ireland) Gerard Greene | 1
(England) Peter Ebdon | 4

Last 16; Best of 7 frames
(England) Joe Perry | 2
(England) Peter Ebdon | 4

===== Section 8 =====
Last 128; Best of 7 frames
(Hong Kong) Marco Fu | 3
(England) Chris Norbury | 4
(England) Michael Wasley | 4
(England) John Astley | 0
(England) Allan Taylor | 4
(England) Lee Page | 3
(China) Liang Wenbo | 4
(China) Lyu Haotian | 2
(Scotland) Graeme Dott | 4
(England) Brandon Sargeant | 2
(England) Ian Glover | 4
(Thailand) Ratchayothin Yotharuck | 2
(Scotland) John Higgins | 4
(England) Michael Williams | 0
(England) Judd Trump | 4
(England) Ashley Carty | 0

Last 64; Best of 7 frames
(England) Chris Norbury | 3
(England) Michael Wasley | 4
(England) Allan Taylor | 2
(China) Liang Wenbo | 4
(Scotland) Graeme Dott | 4
(England) Ian Glover | 1
(Scotland) John Higgins | 1
(England) Judd Trump | 4

Last 32; Best of 7 frames
(England) Michael Wasley | 4
(China) Liang Wenbo | 2
(Scotland) Graeme Dott | 3
(England) Judd Trump | 4

Last 16; Best of 7 frames
(England) Michael Wasley | 4
(England) Judd Trump | 3

==== Finals ====
| Quarter-finals; Best of 7 frames | | Semi-finals; Best of 7 frames | | Final; Best of 7 frames |
| (England) Mark Selby | 2 |
| (England) Shaun Murphy | 4 | (England) Shaun Murphy | 4 |
| (Wales) Michael White | 4 | (Wales) Michael White | 0 |
| (Belgium) Luca Brecel | 2 | | | (England) Shaun Murphy | 4 |
| (England) Martin Gould | 4 | | | (England) Martin Gould | 2 |
| (England) Mark Davis | 2 | (England) Martin Gould | 4 |
| (England) Peter Ebdon | 4 | (England) Peter Ebdon | 2 |
| (England) Michael Wasley | 1 |

== Century breaks ==
- 139 – Dominic Dale
- 138, 108 – Fraser Patrick
- 135 – Ryan Day
- 135 – Michael White
- 133, 108 – Michael Wasley
- 133, 106 – Neil Robertson
- 133 – Liang Wenbo
- 132, 131, 111, 110, 108 – Mark Selby
- 128, 118 – Ricky Walden
- 127, 117, 105 – Judd Trump
- 125 – Oliver Lines
- 123 – Matthew Selt
- 123 – Xiao Guodong
- 122 – Gerard Greene
- 121, 109 – Peter Ebdon
- 119 – Jamie Cope
- 115, 111, 102 – Shaun Murphy
- 114 – Gareth Allen
- 110 – Mark Davis
- 110 – John Higgins
- 109 – Kurt Maflin
- 107, 101 – Martin Gould
- 107 – Robbie Williams
- 106 – Anthony McGill
- 106 – Andrew Higginson
- 105 – Barry Pinches
- 104 – Mark Joyce
- 104 – Liam Highfield
- 104 – Robert Milkins
- 104 – Ben Woollaston
- 103 – Tom Ford
- 103 – Fergal O'Brien
- 101 – Joe Perry
- 100 – Gary Wilson
- 100 – Jimmy White
- 100 – Jeff Cundy
