= 2013–14 snooker world rankings =

Preceded by 2012–13	2013–14	Succeeded by 2014–15

2013–14 snooker world rankings: The professional world rankings for all the professional snooker players who qualified for the 2013‍–‍14 season are listed below. The rankings worked as a two-year rolling list. The points for each tournament two years ago were removed, when the corresponding tournament during the current season finished. The following table contains the rankings, which were used to determine the seedings for certain tournaments.

Name	Country	Revision 1^{[a]}		Revision 2^{[b]}		Revision 3^{[c]}		Revision 4^{[d]}		Revision 5^{[e]}		Revision 6^{[f]}		Revision 7^{[g]}	
Neil Robertson	Australia	2	79460	1	90160	1	86580	1	87680	1	89800	1	89300	1	88800
Mark Selby	England	1	79740	2	83640	2	78100	2	82220	2	87020	2	85160	2	84480
Ding Junhui	China	10	57900	11	59920	7	64700	3	77900	3	79540	3	82520	3	83660
Barry Hawkins	England	9	58880	7	63085	6	65480	8	66620	6	69700	5	68980	4	73500
Stuart Bingham	England	6	62940	8	61800	10	60760	9	64540	7	69500	6	68140	5	72320
Judd Trump	England	3	76720	3	78200	3	75640	4	74760	4	69960	4	70460	6	71640
Marco Fu	Hong Kong	17	49790	13	57110	11	60565	6	67805	9	64645	9	63850	7	69750
Shaun Murphy	England	4	68220	4	68600	4	68680	7	67400	8	66440	8	64420	8	69260
Stephen Maguire	Scotland	5	66940	5	66480	5	66360	5	70200	5	69840	7	64480	9	64080
John Higgins	Scotland	11	56355	6	64575	9	62415	10	64155	12	62235	10	61375	10	63395
Ricky Walden	England	8	59765	9	61710	8	63365	12	62685	11	62485	12	58985	11	60350
Mark Davis	England	13	54280	15	56080	14	56020	13	60440	14	59440	13	58980	12	60055
Ali Carter	England	16	52895	18	54295	15	55795	16	57015	17	56815	16	56455	13	59615
Mark Allen	Northern Ireland	7	62460	10	61220	12	59260	11	63700	10	63700	11	61340	14	59220
Joe Perry	England	20	44580	19	50300	19	50375	18	55515	15	57995	15	56995	15	58580
Robert Milkins	England	18	48580	14	57005	13	57285	14	58765	13	59925	14	58615	16	57165
Graeme Dott	Scotland	12	54900	16	55100	17	53100	15	57340	16	57140	17	55000	17	55480
Mark Williams	Wales	15	53260	17	54520	18	50405	19	55105	18	55065	18	53045	18	55165
Matthew Stevens	Wales	14	53660	12	58200	16	54560	17	56400	19	55040	19	52620	19	52260
Ryan Day	Wales	31	39575	28	42715	26	42615	21	46435	21	45795	21	46675	20	49655
Liang Wenbo	China	32	37600	35	38020	36	37160	26	44460	23	45180	23	45260	21	49610
Michael Holt	England	26	43155	26	43425	21	45205	20	47285	20	47565	20	47740	22	47100
Dominic Dale	Wales	23	43915	20	46095	23	44940	23	45760	29	42360	26	43125	23	44370
Peter Ebdon	England	30	40135	32	41270	29	41095	25	44715	22	45795	22	45295	24	44050
Xiao Guodong	China	37	34185	37	37680	28	41145	27	43705	26	43385	25	43865	25	43670
Mark King	England	29	41665	25	44325	27	42505	28	42865	25	43585	24	44050	26	43270
Ronnie O'Sullivan	England	19	46360	21	45640	25	42900	29	42780	24	44300	31	39700	27	42640
Ben Woollaston	England	33	37590	31	41620	32	39315	33	40955	34	39715	30	39715	28	41755
Ken Doherty	Ireland	27	42130	30	41790	30	40670	32	41450	33	39850	34	38790	29	40380
Michael White	Wales	34	36495	33	39315	34	38740	34	40280	32	40040	33	38870	30	40145
David Gilbert	England	41	32055	41	34470	35	37270	35	39130	36	38890	36	38345	31	40045
Fergal O'Brien	Ireland	36	35590	34	38200	40	34425	36	37745	35	39065	35	38670	32	39825
Andrew Higginson	England	22	44055	23	45315	24	43995	30	42355	28	42675	27	40615	33	39520
Alan McManus	Scotland	49	29505	43	32945	46	31860	45	33800	43	34120	42	34200	34	39040
Marcus Campbell	Scotland	28	42045	29	42025	31	40465	31	42005	31	42005	29	40185	35	38670
Tom Ford	England	24	43715	24	45235	22	44990	24	45190	27	42830	28	40330	36	38650
Mark Joyce	England	42	31620	48	31605	43	32895	37	36335	39	35535	39	35750	37	38155
Martin Gould	England	25	43515	22	45375	20	45775	22	46335	30	42295	32	39115	38	38115
Jack Lisowski	England	35	35625	36	38005	37	36585	39	35785	37	35625	37	36140	39	36880
Anthony Hamilton	England	43	31440	39	35810	39	34530	41	35150	42	34710	43	34180	40	36480
Kurt Maflin	Norway	64	18690	62	21555	60	23735	60	27175	51	30135	47	32035	41	36155
Rod Lawler	England	59	21535	59	23140	58	24715	56	28715	50	30515	44	33715	42	36135
Jamie Burnett	Scotland	39	34005	40	34890	42	33420	44	34400	40	35360	38	35800	43	35200
Anthony McGill	Scotland	48	29580	46	32235	51	30350	43	34490	41	34730	40	34620	44	35120
Jamie Jones	Wales	40	32510	42	34375	38	34565	42	35145	38	35585	41	34275	45	34835
Alfie Burden	England	53	27740	50	31295	45	31940	47	33420	44	34100	45	33600	46	34250
Rory McLeod	England	45	30900	45	32520	44	32700	46	33780	48	32780	48	31920	47	33760
Yu Delu	China	47	29805	47	31815	48	31225	48	32365	46	33685	49	31425	48	33605
Jamie Cope	England	38	34145	38	37165	41	33840	40	35380	45	33900	46	32605	49	31390
Cao Yupeng	China	66	17305	60	22130	59	24090	58	27450	57	28090	55	28990	50	31150
Liu Chuang	China	54	27145	53	28920	52	28560	52	30100	49	31020	50	30770	51	30875
Tian Pengfei	China	70	15660	67	18820	65	20440	66	23200	62	25000	59	26900	52	30180
Jimmy Robertson	England	52	27895	49	31400	47	31840	49	30680	52	30120	52	29760	53	30135
Dechawat Poomjaeng	Thailand	67	16990	64	21110	62	22285	62	24325	60	25765	58	27165	54	29625
Peter Lines	England	57	22620	57	25655	55	27255	54	29695	55	28335	56	28225	55	29265
Nigel Bond	England	46	30695	44	32825	49	30600	50	30660	53	30060	53	29215	56	29025
Dave Harold	England	50	29285	54	28835	54	28345	55	29265	54	29545	51	29760	57	28460
Matthew Selt	England	44	30965	51	30720	53	28405	53	29845	56	28245	57	27600	58	28280
Aditya Mehta	India	73	13360	74	15180	73	17210	64	23210	63	24850	63	25750	59	27770
Gerard Greene	Northern Ireland	56	23145	56	25990	56	27240	59	27300	61	25540	62	25755	60	27555
Jimmy White	England	55	25225	55	27235	57	27025	57	27585	59	26665	61	25855	61	27155
Thepchaiya Un-Nooh	Thailand	69	15715	70	16600	70	17870	71	21070	71	22070	69	22970	62	26530
Pankaj Advani	India	74	13230	73	15250	71	17630	67	22130	66	23690	64	24090	63	26450
Steve Davis	England	51	28270	52	29890	50	30510	51	30510	58	27710	60	26590	64	26280
Scott Donaldson	Scotland	89	7110	81	13200	81	14830	80	17190	76	20350	76	20750	65	25670
Ian Burns	England	68	15960	68	18480	66	20110	70	21150	69	23150	66	23550	66	25570
Robbie Williams	England	79	11460	79	13890	75	16220	69	21340	67	23500	65	23900	67	25220
Barry Pinches	England	62	20415	66	20260	67	19105	68	21365	70	22245	73	21960	68	24660
James Wattana	Thailand	61	21215	61	22075	64	21215	63	23435	65	24355	68	22995	69	24175
Sam Baird	England	81	10940	80	13345	77	15725	79	17325	78	19725	78	20125	70	23705
Luca Brecel	Belgium	72	13500	71	15770	72	17600	72	19640	72	21440	70	22340	71	23300
Mike Dunn	England	63	19590	63	21120	63	21730	61	25430	64	24790	67	23530	72	23290
Paul Davison	England	75	13110	72	15430	78	15710	74	18770	74	20570	72	21970	73	23290
Zhang Anda	China	77	11910	76	14730	80	15010	75	18570	75	20370	75	20770	74	23090
Michael Wasley	England	80	11420	77	14660	74	17190	76	18230	77	19990	77	20390	75	22610
Liam Highfield	England	76	13050	69	16740	69	18010	73	19550	73	20750	74	21150	76	22110
Thanawat Thirapongpaiboon	Thailand	71	14140	75	15025	76	16065	77	18105	79	19305	79	19705	77	21025
Adam Duffy	England	60	21235	58	23195	61	22845	65	23205	68	23205	71	21985	78	20535
Chen Zhe	China	78	11890	78	14050	79	15320	78	17780	80	18420	80	18820	79	20140
Craig Steadman	England	83	10105	83	12265	83	13175	83	15575	82	16575	82	16975	80	19695
Tony Drago	Malta	82	10350	82	12980	82	14250	82	16150	81	17550	81	17950	81	19270
Joel Walker	England	90	5890	89	9060	89	10330	88	12230	86	14630	84	16030	82	19090
Gary Wilson	England			94	4110	96	5740	91	10440	89	13600	87	15000	83	18160
Stephen Lee	England	21	44335	27	43200	33	38880	38	36120	47	32960	54	29200	84	18100
Li Yan	China	84	9360	85	10570	88	11480	84	15040	83	15680	83	16080	85	17740
David Grace	England	88	7905	88	9785	85	12105	85	13505	84	15065	86	15465	86	16785
Daniel Wells	Wales	87	8170	84	10860	84	12330	86	13370	85	14810	85	15710	87	16670
Martin O'Donnell	England	86	8340	87	9860	86	11680	87	13080	87	14080	88	14480	88	16000
David Morris	Ireland	129	0	95	4060	92	6990	93	8530	90	12690	89	13590	89	15250
Kyren Wilson	England			101	2380	93	6800	90	10700	92	12060	90	12460	90	13420
Simon Bedford	England	85	8345	86	10415	87	11675	89	11675	91	12315	91	12315	91	12315
Michael Leslie	Scotland	94	3890	93	5820	94	6460	94	8300	94	10100	94	10500	92	12160
Sean O'Sullivan	England	91	5590	90	7360	90	8630	92	10170	93	11610	92	11610	93	12010
Jamie O'Neill	England	93	4060	91	6190	91	7100	95	8140	95	9580	95	10480	94	11440
Li Hang	China			97	2970	98	4440	98	6200	96	8440	96	9340	95	11360
Noppon Saengkham	Thailand			107	1960	110	2240	109	3780	104	6020	101	6920	96	9780
Alex Davies	England			99	2670	101	3510	97	6410	99	7050	99	7450	97	9670
Stuart Carrington	England			102	2330	107	2690	100	5890	97	8130	97	8530	98	9490
Lyu Haotian	China			104	2160	109	2440	102	5580	102	6220	103	6620	99	8980
John Astley	England			98	2830	97	4660	101	5700	98	7500	98	7900	100	8860
Andrew Pagett	Wales			100	2580	102	3490	105	4890	103	6090	104	6490	101	8450
Joe Swail	Northern Ireland	148	0	106	1970	99	3810	99	6010	100	6650	100	7050	102	8370
Stephen Hendry	Scotland	58	22175	65	20275	68	18015	81	17095	88	13935	93	11520	103	7660
Ross Muir	Scotland			112	1460	106	2730	104	4890	105	5890	105	6290	104	7610
Chris Wakelin	England			114	1320	112	1960	112	3360	107	5800	107	6200	105	7520
Hammad Miah	England			105	2130	105	2770	103	5170	106	5810	106	6210	106	7170
Andrew Norman	England	131	0	109	1770	104	2970	108	3970	108	5170	108	5570	107	6890
Elliot Slessor	England			108	1820	111	2100	107	4000	109	5000	109	5400	108	6720
Passakorn Suwannawat	Thailand	92	5590	92	5950	95	6230	96	6630	101	6630	102	6630	109	6630
Vinnie Calabrese	Australia			113	1460	108	2500	110	3540	110	4980	110	5380	110	6340
Chris Norbury	England			119	760	115	1670	111	3470	111	4910	111	5310	111	6270
Lee Page	England			110	1570	113	1850	113	2890	114	3530	115	3930	112	5250
Ratchayothin Yotharuck	Thailand			188	0	128	280	117	2320	116	3320	113	4220	113	5180
Allan Taylor	England			120	760	116	1670	114	2710	115	3350	116	3750	114	5070
Fraser Patrick	Scotland			116	920	119	1200	118	2240	118	3240	119	3640	115	4960
Ryan Clark	England			115	1210	118	1490	116	2530	113	3530	114	3930	116	4890
James Cahill	England			117	760	117	1600	115	2640	117	3280	117	3680	117	4640
Cao Xinlong	China			124	360	124	360	121	2120	121	2760	118	3660	118	4620
Mohamed Khairy	Egypt	96	1410	103	2170	103	3430	106	4470	112	4470	112	4470	119	4470
Robin Hull	Finland	119	0	149	0	126	280	120	2120	119	3120	120	3520	120	4080
Jak Jones	Wales			118	760	120	1040	122	2080	122	2720	121	3120	121	4080
Alex Borg	Malta			129	0	125	280	123	1680	123	2320	123	2720	122	4040
Alexander Ursenbacher	Switzerland			182	0	183	0	126	1040	124	2040	124	2440	123	3400
Patrick Einsle	Germany			111	1480	114	1760	119	2160	120	2800	122	2800	124	3160
Ahmed Saif	Qatar			169	0	127	280	125	1320	125	1960	125	1960	125	2360
Jin Long	China			122	360	122	360	124	1480	126	1480	126	1480	126	2040
Khaled Belaid Abumdas	Libya									130	0	129	400	127	1360
Shi Hanqing	China			121	360	121	360	127	720	127	720	127	720	128	720
Lee Spick	England			175	0	176	0	128	640	128	640	128	640	129	640
Hossein Vafaei	Iran	97	360	123	360	123	360	129	360	129	360	130	360	130	360
Igor Figueiredo	Brazil			137	0	140	0	141	0	142	0	142	0	142	0
Ben Judge	Australia	95	3560	96	3560	100	3560								

== Notes ==
- ^{a} Revision 1 was used for the seeding of the Wuxi Classic, Australian Goldfields Open, Bulgarian Open, Yixing Open and Six-red World Championship.
- ^{b} Revision 2 was used for the seeding of the Shanghai Masters and Indian Open.
- ^{c} Revision 3 was used for the seeding of the International Championship.
- ^{d} Revision 4 was used for the seeding of the UK Championship.
- ^{e} Revision 5 was used for the seeding of the German Masters, the World Open, the Masters and the Snooker Shoot-Out.
- ^{f} Revision 6 was used for the seeding of the Welsh Open and the China Open.
- ^{g} Revision 7 was used for the seeding of the World Championship.
