= 2013 Australian Goldfields Open =

Australian Goldfields Open

Tournament information
- Dates: 8–14 July 2013
- Venue: Bendigo Stadium
- City: Bendigo
- Country: Australia
- Organisation: World Snooker
- Format: Ranking event
- Total prize fund: $445,000
- Winner's share: $70,000
- Highest break: Neil Robertson (AUS) (138)

Final
- Champion: Marco Fu (HKG)
- Runner-up: Neil Robertson (AUS)
- Score: 9–6

The 2013 Australian Goldfields Open was a professional ranking snooker tournament that took place between 8–14 July 2013 at the Bendigo Stadium in Bendigo, Australia. It was the second ranking event of the 2013/2014 season.

Michael White attempted a maximum break in his qualifying match against Nigel Bond, but he missed the final black at 140. With this he became the fifth player along with Mark Selby, Ken Doherty, Barry Pinches and Robin Hull to do so in a professional tournament.

Shaun Murphy criticised his fellow professionals after eight of the top 16 players and reigning world champion Ronnie O'Sullivan decided not to register for the event. Another top 16 player, Ding Junhui, withdrew from the tournament at the last minute due to a passport issue.

Barry Hawkins was the defending champion, but he lost 4–5 against Tom Ford in the last 16.

Marco Fu won his second ranking title by defeating Neil Robertson 9–6 in the final.

== Prize fund ==
The total prize money of the event was raised to $445,000 from the previous year's $435,000. The breakdown of prize money for this year is shown below:

- Winner: $70,000
- Runner-up: $30,000
- Semi-final: $20,000
- Quarter-final: $15,000
- Last 16: $10,000
- Last 32: $7,500
- Last 48: $1,600
- Last 64: $750
- Last 96: $150
- Non-televised highest break: $100
- Televised highest break: $2,500
- Total: $445,000

== Wildcard round ==
These matches were played in Bendigo on 8 July.

Match		Score	
WC1	Mike Dunn (ENG)	5–4	Steve Mifsud (AUS)
WC2	Michael White (WAL)	5–0	Shaun Dalitz (AUS)

== Main draw ==
Last 32; Best of 9 frames
1	(England) Barry Hawkins	5
(Thailand) Dechawat Poomjaeng	1
14	(England) Tom Ford	5
(Wales) Ryan Day	3
10	(England) Robert Milkins	5
(England) Ben Woollaston	3
7	(China) Ding Junhui	w/d
(England) Rory McLeod	w/o
6	(England) Ricky Walden	4
(Republic of Ireland) Fergal O'Brien	5
13	(Wales) Dominic Dale	5
(England) Mike Dunn	4
9	(Hong Kong) Marco Fu	5
(Republic of Ireland) Ken Doherty	2
4	(England) Shaun Murphy	5
(Wales) Michael White	1
3	(Australia) Neil Robertson	5
(Scotland) Marcus Campbell	1
15	(England) Martin Gould	4
(England) Jamie Cope	5
11	(England) Joe Perry	5
(China) Xiao Guodong	0
5	(England) Stuart Bingham	5
(Thailand) Noppon Saengkham	1
8	(England) Mark Davis	5
(England) Paul Davison	4
16	(England) Michael Holt	2
(England) Alfie Burden	5
12	(England) Andrew Higginson	1
(China) Zhang Anda	5
2	(England) Mark Selby	5
(England) Ian Burns	4

Last 16; Best of 9 frames
1	(England) Barry Hawkins	4
14	(England) Tom Ford	5
10	(England) Robert Milkins	5
(England) Rory McLeod	2
(Republic of Ireland) Fergal O'Brien	2
13	(Wales) Dominic Dale	5
9	(Hong Kong) Marco Fu	5
4	(England) Shaun Murphy	2
3	(Australia) Neil Robertson	5
(England) Jamie Cope	3
11	(England) Joe Perry	5
5	(England) Stuart Bingham	3
8	(England) Mark Davis	5
(England) Alfie Burden	3
(China) Zhang Anda	1
2	(England) Mark Selby	5

Quarter-finals; Best of 9 frames
14	(England) Tom Ford	3
10	(England) Robert Milkins	5
13	(Wales) Dominic Dale	1
9	(Hong Kong) Marco Fu	5
3	(Australia) Neil Robertson	5
11	(England) Joe Perry	2
8	(England) Mark Davis	3
2	(England) Mark Selby	5

Semi-finals; Best of 11 frames
10	(England) Robert Milkins	4
9	(Hong Kong) Marco Fu	6
3	(Australia) Neil Robertson	6
2	(England) Mark Selby	3

Final; Best of 17 frames
9	(Hong Kong) Marco Fu	9
3	(Australia) Neil Robertson	6

== Final ==
Final: Best of 17 frames. Referee: Leo Scullion. Bendigo Stadium, Bendigo, Australia, 14 July 2013.
Marco Fu (9); Hong Kong	9–6	Neil Robertson (3); Australia
Afternoon: 122–11 (98), 0–86 (78), 8–125 (92), 87–54 (80), 83–19, 61–9, 4–65 (57), 84–31; Evening: 0–94 (57), 71–60 (Fu 58, Robertson 60), 98–0 (70), 33–69 (59), 38–70, 76–46, 108–1 (102)
102	Highest break	92
1	Century breaks	0
5	50+ breaks	6

== Qualifying ==
These matches were held between 30 May and 3 June 2013 at The Capital Venue in Gloucester, England. In the match between Barry Pinches and Simon Bedford a 19-year-old record from the qualifying stage of the 1994 British Open was broken. The match lasted 449 minutes and 46 seconds, the longest ever best-of-nine-frame match in the history of professional snooker. The previous record was 434 minutes and 12 seconds in the match between Ian Williamson and Robby Foldvari.

Round 1 Best of 9 frames
(Northern Ireland) Joe Swail	5
(England) Darren Cook	2
(England) Stuart Carrington	5
(England) Mitchell Mann	1
(Malta) Tony Drago	5
(England) Christopher Keogan	2
(England) Gary Wilson	5
(Scotland) Dylan Craig	0
(Scotland) Michael Leslie	5
(Germany) Phil Barnes	3
(England) Joel Walker	5
(England) Oliver Brown	3
(Wales) Jak Jones	4
(England) Gareth Green	5
(Scotland) Scott Donaldson	5
(England) Shane Castle	3
(England) Kyren Wilson	5
(Wales) Andrew Rogers	2
(Germany) Patrick Einsle	4
(England) Zak Surety	5
(England) Craig Steadman	5
(England) Antony Parsons	3
(England) Allan Taylor	4
(England) Saqib Nasir	5
(England) Simon Bedford	5
(Isle of Man) Darryl Hill	1
(England) Elliot Slessor	5
(Wales) Jamie Clarke	4
(China) Li Hang	5
(Republic of Ireland) Josh Boileau	1
(England) Jamie O'Neill	5
(England) Phil O'Kane	1
(Scotland) Ross Muir	5
(England) James Cahill	1
(Wales) Daniel Wells	5
(England) Mitchell Travis	1
(England) Chris Norbury	2
(England) Matthew Day	5
(England) Ryan Clark	5
(Australia) Vinnie Calabrese	3
(Egypt) Mohamed Khairy	3
(England) Darrell Whitworth	5
(England) Lee Page	5
(England) Chris Wakelin	3
(Wales) Andrew Pagett	3
(Thailand) Noppon Saengkham	5
(China) Li Yan	5
(England) Dylan Mitchell	1
(England) Alex Davies	5
(England) Ben Harrison	3
(England) Andrew Norman	5
(Republic of Ireland) David Morris	0
(England) John Astley	5
(England) Darren Bond	3
(China) Lyu Haotian	4
(England) Ashley Carty	5
(England) David Grace	4
(England) Oliver Lines	5
(England) Hammad Miah	5
(England) Sydney Wilson	4
(England) Sean O'Sullivan	5
(England) Sanderson Lam	2
(England) Martin O'Donnell	2
(England) Ryan Causton	5

Round 2 Best of 9 frames
(India) Pankaj Advani	5
(Northern Ireland) Joe Swail	4
(Thailand) Dechawat Poomjaeng	5
(England) Stuart Carrington	3
(Thailand) Thepchaiya Un-Nooh	4
(Malta) Tony Drago	5
(China) Tian Pengfei	5
(England) Gary Wilson	4
(China) Yu Delu	5
(Scotland) Michael Leslie	1
(England) Jimmy White	5
(England) Joel Walker	1
(England) Adam Duffy	5
(England) Gareth Green	3
(England) Jimmy Robertson	4
(Scotland) Scott Donaldson	5
(Scotland) Alan McManus	3
(England) Kyren Wilson	5
(Thailand) James Wattana	5
(England) Zak Surety	1
(Norway) Kurt Maflin	4
(England) Craig Steadman	5
(England) Mike Dunn	5
(England) Saqib Nasir	4
(England) Barry Pinches	4
(England) Simon Bedford	5
(China) Cao Yupeng	2
(England) Elliot Slessor	5
(China) Liu Chuang	5
(China) Li Hang	4
(England) Nigel Bond	5
(England) Jamie O'Neill	3
(England) Rod Lawler	1
(Scotland) Ross Muir	5
(England) Liam Highfield	5
(Wales) Daniel Wells	1
(England) Sam Baird	4
(England) Matthew Day	5
(Belgium) Luca Brecel	5
(England) Ryan Clark	1
(England) Robbie Williams	5
(England) Darrell Whitworth	1
(India) Aditya Mehta	5
(England) Lee Page	0
(Thailand) Thanawat Thirapongpaiboon	1
(Thailand) Noppon Saengkham	5
(Scotland) Anthony McGill	5
(China) Li Yan	2
(England) Peter Lines	5
(England) Alex Davies	4
(England) Paul Davison	5
(England) Andrew Norman	4
(England) Alfie Burden	5
(England) John Astley	2
(England) Michael Wasley	5
(England) Ashley Carty	3
(China) Zhang Anda	5
(England) Oliver Lines	4
(Northern Ireland) Gerard Greene	5
(England) Hammad Miah	2
(China) Chen Zhe	5
(England) Sean O'Sullivan	1
(England) Ian Burns	5
(England) Ryan Causton	3

Round 3 Best of 9 frames
(India) Pankaj Advani	3
(Thailand) Dechawat Poomjaeng	5
(Malta) Tony Drago	5
(China) Tian Pengfei	3
(China) Yu Delu	3
(England) Jimmy White	5
(England) Adam Duffy	3
(Scotland) Scott Donaldson	5
(England) Kyren Wilson	4
(Thailand) James Wattana	5
(England) Craig Steadman	1
(England) Mike Dunn	5
(England) Simon Bedford	5
(England) Elliot Slessor	2
(China) Liu Chuang	1
(England) Nigel Bond	5
(Scotland) Ross Muir	2
(England) Liam Highfield	5
(England) Matthew Day	3
(Belgium) Luca Brecel	5
(England) Robbie Williams	5
(India) Aditya Mehta	4
(Thailand) Noppon Saengkham	5
(Scotland) Anthony McGill	1
(England) Peter Lines	1
(England) Paul Davison	5
(England) Alfie Burden	5
(England) Michael Wasley	4
(China) Zhang Anda	5
(Northern Ireland) Gerard Greene	4
(China) Chen Zhe	2
(England) Ian Burns	5

Round 4 Best of 9 frames
(Scotland) Jamie Burnett	2
(Thailand) Dechawat Poomjaeng	5
(Wales) Ryan Day	5
(Malta) Tony Drago	3
(England) Ben Woollaston	5
(England) Jimmy White	1
(England) Rory McLeod	5
(Scotland) Scott Donaldson	3
(Republic of Ireland) Fergal O'Brien	5
(Thailand) James Wattana	2
(England) Peter Ebdon	2
(England) Mike Dunn	5
(Republic of Ireland) Ken Doherty	5
(England) Simon Bedford	0
(Wales) Michael White	5
(England) Nigel Bond	1
(Scotland) Marcus Campbell	5
(England) Liam Highfield	4
(England) Jamie Cope	5
(Belgium) Luca Brecel	1
(China) Xiao Guodong	5
(England) Robbie Williams	1
(Wales) Jamie Jones	1
(Thailand) Noppon Saengkham	5
(England) Mark King	3
(England) Paul Davison	5
(England) Mark Joyce	3
(England) Alfie Burden	5
(England) David Gilbert	4
(China) Zhang Anda	5
(England) Matthew Selt	2
(England) Ian Burns	5

== Century breaks ==
=== Qualifying stage centuries ===
- 141 – Paul Davison
- 140 – Michael White
- 137 – Stuart Carrington
- 136, 102 – Scott Donaldson
- 133, 100 – Ryan Day
- 130 – Alfie Burden
- 128 – Joel Walker
- 126 – Tian Pengfei
- 124 – Thepchaiya Un-Nooh
- 117 – Simon Bedford
- 115 – John Astley
- 115 – Mark Joyce
- 114, 108, 100 – Ashley Carty
- 112 – Luca Brecel
- 111 – Tony Drago
- 110 – Kurt Maflin
- 109 – Jamie Cope
- 107 – Jak Jones
- 101 – David Grace
- 100 – Craig Steadman

=== Televised stage centuries ===
- 138, 125, 111, 102, 102 – Neil Robertson
- 137 – Rory McLeod
- 136 – Alfie Burden
- 135 – Martin Gould
- 131, 130, 115, 102, 102 – Marco Fu
- 129 – Shaun Murphy
- 128 – Tom Ford
- 124, 112 – Paul Davison
- 123, 112 – Robert Milkins
- 122 – Michael White
- 116 – Ken Doherty
- 112 – Dominic Dale
- 109 – Ryan Day
- 104 – Mark Davis
