= 2014–15 snooker world rankings =

| Preceded by 2013–14 | 2014–15 | Succeeded by 2015–16 |

2014–15 snooker world rankings: The professional world rankings for all the professional snooker players who qualified for the 2014‍–‍15 season are listed below. The rankings work as a two-year rolling list. The points for each tournament two years ago are removed, when the corresponding tournament during the current season finishes. The following table contains the rankings, which were used to determine the seedings for certain tournaments.

| Name (Note: Stephen Hendry, Steve Davis and James Wattana are not listed there, despite receiving an Invitational Tour Card, because they are not automatically eligible to compete at tournaments.) | Country | Revision 1 (Note: Revision 1 was used for the seeding of the Wuxi Classic, the Australian Goldfields Open, the Yixing Open and the Six-red World Championship.) | | Revision 2 (Note: Revision 2 was used for the seeding of the Shanghai Masters and the Riga Open.) | | Revision 3 (Note: Revision 3 was used for the seeding of the International Championship.) | | Revision 4 (Note: Revision 4 was used for the seeding of the UK Championship.) | | Revision 5 (Note: Revision 5 was used for the seeding of the German Masters, the Masters and the Welsh Open.) | | Revision 6 (Note: Revision 6 was used for the seeding of the Indian Open, the China Open and the Snooker Shoot-Out.) | | Revision 7 (Note: Revision 7 was used for the seeding of the World Championship.) | | Revision 8 | |
|---|---|---|---|---|---|---|---|---|---|---|---|---|---|---|---|---|---|
| Mark Selby | England | 1 | 774,089 | 2 | 768,178 | 1 | 796,866 | 1 | 783,507 | 4 | 659,420 | 1 | 707,266 | 1 | 756,382 | 1 | 760,382 |
| Stuart Bingham | England | 12 | 276,081 | 11 | 251,714 | 10 | 325,253 | 9 | 333,166 | 8 | 348,083 | 8 | 343,886 | 10 | 332,078 | 2 | 608,028 |
| Neil Robertson | Australia | 3 | 680,748 | 1 | 774,096 | 2 | 758,512 | 2 | 702,031 | 2 | 698,018 | 4 | 672,447 | 4 | 578,693 | 3 | 602,693 |
| Ding Junhui | China | 2 | 700,671 | 3 | 699,741 | 3 | 709,077 | 3 | 697,586 | 1 | 700,336 | 3 | 678,541 | 3 | 586,150 | 4 | 592,100 |
| Ronnie O'Sullivan | England | 4 | 505,616 | 4 | 505,616 | 4 | 507,533 | 4 | 525,033 | 3 | 675,033 | 2 | 683,366 | 2 | 685,866 | 5 | 465,866 |
| Shaun Murphy | England | 7 | 366,405 | 7 | 372,927 | 7 | 359,810 | 7 | 357,643 | 11 | 339,485 | 7 | 352,940 | 8 | 356,549 | 6 | 457,499 |
| Judd Trump | England | 6 | 407,322 | 6 | 449,489 | 6 | 428,331 | 11 | 311,857 | 7 | 368,723 | 6 | 366,999 | 6 | 387,832 | 7 | 395,832 |
| Barry Hawkins | England | 5 | 498,199 | 5 | 468,189 | 5 | 461,989 | 5 | 467,902 | 5 | 457,815 | 5 | 442,933 | 5 | 446,433 | 8 | 381,433 |
| Joe Perry | England | 15 | 198,065 | 14 | 224,154 | 14 | 208,476 | 13 | 215,329 | 13 | 221,571 | 13 | 235,140 | 9 | 342,823 | 9 | 358,723 |
| Ricky Walden | England | 10 | 296,860 | 12 | 235,393 | 11 | 230,893 | 8 | 339,323 | 9 | 346,982 | 9 | 334,175 | 7 | 370,171 | 10 | 318,171 |
| Marco Fu | Hong Kong | 8 | 342,873 | 8 | 341,363 | 9 | 332,679 | 10 | 330,515 | 10 | 341,432 | 11 | 307,957 | 11 | 311,566 | 11 | 315,566 |
| Mark Allen | Northern Ireland | 9 | 305,118 | 10 | 297,618 | 8 | 353,760 | 6 | 391,876 | 6 | 397,135 | 10 | 312,000 | 12 | 300,500 | 12 | 314,500 |
| John Higgins | Scotland | 11 | 284,959 | 9 | 298,326 | 12 | 223,322 | 12 | 222,427 | 14 | 209,318 | 14 | 193,083 | 13 | 270,000 | 13 | 284,000 |
| Mark Williams | Wales | 18 | 163,388 | 20 | 159,088 | 22 | 145,405 | 18 | 171,518 | 17 | 178,014 | 16 | 178,233 | 14 | 252,233 | 14 | 246,233 |
| Stephen Maguire | Scotland | 14 | 217,476 | 13 | 226,976 | 13 | 212,630 | 14 | 204,630 | 12 | 228,030 | 12 | 255,053 | 15 | 206,966 | 15 | 200,966 |
| Robert Milkins | England | 20 | 161,864 | 17 | 168,665 | 18 | 161,899 | 16 | 182,982 | 15 | 193,891 | 15 | 183,414 | 17 | 191,660 | 16 | 187,660 |
| Michael White | Wales | 27 | 115,938 | 30 | 112,652 | 27 | 121,565 | 25 | 136,087 | 26 | 131,570 | 23 | 130,520 | 16 | 195,270 | 17 | 177,220 |
| Graeme Dott | Scotland | 17 | 176,583 | 16 | 173,683 | 16 | 176,305 | 17 | 176,827 | 16 | 184,827 | 17 | 174,208 | 19 | 171,516 | 18 | 175,516 |
| Mark Davis | England | 16 | 188,163 | 18 | 167,814 | 17 | 161,927 | 19 | 160,469 | 19 | 153,923 | 18 | 157,380 | 18 | 175,985 | 19 | 171,985 |
| Ryan Day | Wales | 21 | 146,443 | 21 | 149,363 | 20 | 146,963 | 22 | 148,259 | 22 | 140,842 | 21 | 142,545 | 20 | 155,087 | 20 | 162,987 |
| Xiao Guodong | China | 23 | 138,177 | 22 | 147,515 | 23 | 144,391 | 20 | 155,641 | 20 | 152,550 | 19 | 154,590 | 22 | 143,899 | 21 | 150,599 |
| Liang Wenbo | China | 26 | 126,689 | 24 | 134,116 | 24 | 137,505 | 26 | 135,505 | 25 | 131,944 | 20 | 145,579 | 21 | 145,101 | 22 | 145,901 |
| Alan McManus | Scotland | 29 | 112,988 | 27 | 122,082 | 25 | 135,132 | 24 | 138,908 | 24 | 138,321 | 22 | 131,876 | 23 | 137,206 | 23 | 137,206 |
| Anthony McGill | Scotland | 45 | 76,520 | 42 | 77,901 | 40 | 82,364 | 37 | 88,473 | 30 | 105,495 | 29 | 101,803 | 32 | 109,412 | 24 | 137,112 |
| Michael Holt | England | 22 | 139,705 | 23 | 141,882 | 21 | 145,586 | 23 | 144,095 | 23 | 139,187 | 24 | 128,866 | 25 | 134,475 | 25 | 131,475 |
| Martin Gould | England | 30 | 112,148 | 26 | 127,170 | 28 | 120,375 | 27 | 133,875 | 27 | 128,784 | 25 | 125,908 | 24 | 137,111 | 26 | 125,111 |
| Fergal O'Brien | Ireland | 31 | 111,263 | 29 | 112,787 | 29 | 118,800 | 28 | 119,383 | 28 | 113,209 | 27 | 114,099 | 26 | 116,949 | 27 | 121,849 |
| Matthew Stevens | Wales | 19 | 163,258 | 19 | 166,272 | 19 | 161,655 | 21 | 152,638 | 21 | 144,034 | 31 | 101,213 | 35 | 103,626 | 28 | 117,626 |
| Ali Carter (Note: Ali Carter's seeding was based on a world ranking of 13.) | England | 13 | 222,125 | 15 | 216,714 | 15 | 203,114 | 15 | 193,768 | 18 | 167,581 | 26 | 115,441 | 31 | 110,050 | 29 | 114,050 |
| Matthew Selt | England | 48 | 69,543 | 55 | 60,598 | 48 | 68,148 | 45 | 73,311 | 42 | 80,811 | 37 | 91,457 | 30 | 110,157 | 30 | 110,157 |
| Peter Ebdon | England | 25 | 129,520 | 31 | 110,697 | 30 | 107,830 | 33 | 95,743 | 31 | 101,985 | 30 | 101,417 | 27 | 114,917 | 31 | 108,917 |
| Ben Woollaston | England | 40 | 86,874 | 38 | 91,724 | 37 | 89,037 | 36 | 90,723 | 36 | 92,642 | 36 | 92,434 | 28 | 114,203 | 32 | 108,203 |
| Dominic Dale | Wales | 24 | 130,848 | 25 | 127,237 | 26 | 125,912 | 29 | 117,295 | 29 | 110,204 | 28 | 103,144 | 29 | 111,824 | 33 | 105,824 |
| Gary Wilson | England | 68 | 42,576 | 64 | 45,993 | 62 | 47,159 | 65 | 47,742 | 64 | 47,742 | 61 | 49,775 | 37 | 96,775 | 34 | 102,775 |
| David Gilbert | England | 37 | 92,401 | 37 | 91,815 | 36 | 89,690 | 34 | 93,690 | 32 | 98,190 | 34 | 95,299 | 34 | 103,916 | 35 | 101,716 |
| Mark King | England | 28 | 113,586 | 28 | 114,793 | 31 | 107,076 | 30 | 105,806 | 35 | 96,523 | 32 | 97,229 | 33 | 105,834 | 36 | 98,834 |
| Kurt Maflin | Norway | 34 | 93,888 | 34 | 95,588 | 32 | 96,157 | 32 | 96,153 | 33 | 97,966 | 35 | 94,994 | 38 | 92,930 | 37 | 96,730 |
| Jamie Jones | Wales | 55 | 61,366 | 46 | 72,940 | 47 | 68,636 | 46 | 71,886 | 47 | 70,878 | 46 | 71,991 | 40 | 86,383 | 38 | 96,083 |
| Rod Lawler | England | 39 | 88,294 | 40 | 83,794 | 41 | 76,253 | 38 | 88,445 | 34 | 97,687 | 33 | 96,333 | 36 | 97,070 | 39 | 94,870 |
| Gerard Greene | Northern Ireland | 44 | 77,704 | 45 | 74,118 | 43 | 73,743 | 44 | 73,993 | 44 | 75,393 | 44 | 76,476 | 41 | 81,809 | 40 | 87,809 |
| Jimmy Robertson | England | 54 | 63,722 | 54 | 62,311 | 53 | 63,103 | 47 | 69,933 | 46 | 70,942 | 45 | 73,297 | 42 | 79,210 | 41 | 86,610 |
| Mike Dunn | England | 58 | 56,787 | 57 | 56,926 | 55 | 60,259 | 51 | 65,259 | 48 | 68,842 | 48 | 67,342 | 45 | 74,342 | 42 | 80,342 |
| Dechawat Poomjaeng | Thailand | 47 | 69,737 | 48 | 70,737 | 42 | 75,562 | 42 | 78,758 | 41 | 86,950 | 40 | 84,369 | 39 | 90,061 | 43 | 80,061 |
| Luca Brecel | Belgium | 63 | 48,850 | 61 | 52,350 | 58 | 54,442 | 59 | 55,884 | 66 | 42,493 | 66 | 42,489 | 47 | 72,431 | 44 | 78,431 |
| Ken Doherty | Ireland | 33 | 102,712 | 35 | 93,389 | 35 | 93,702 | 40 | 84,615 | 38 | 90,661 | 38 | 86,025 | 46 | 73,438 | 45 | 78,338 |
| Jamie Burnett | Scotland | 41 | 85,598 | 43 | 76,168 | 50 | 66,976 | 43 | 77,085 | 45 | 74,335 | 47 | 70,404 | 48 | 71,250 | 46 | 77,950 |
| Mark Joyce | England | 38 | 89,702 | 32 | 97,869 | 34 | 94,148 | 31 | 96,848 | 39 | 87,540 | 42 | 79,922 | 43 | 78,531 | 47 | 76,331 |
| Andrew Higginson | England | 36 | 93,344 | 36 | 92,933 | 33 | 95,279 | 35 | 91,271 | 37 | 91,274 | 41 | 80,017 | 50 | 70,126 | 48 | 75,026 |
| Thepchaiya Un-Nooh | Thailand | 59 | 53,160 | 58 | 54,160 | 57 | 55,326 | 58 | 56,048 | 62 | 50,370 | 58 | 52,349 | 49 | 70,345 | 49 | 71,745 |
| Robbie Williams | England | 62 | 49,375 | 60 | 52,792 | 59 | 53,317 | 57 | 56,343 | 57 | 59,726 | 56 | 59,472 | 58 | 58,164 | 50 | 70,164 |
| David Morris | Ireland | 71 | 40,933 | 65 | 43,933 | 63 | 45,683 | 63 | 48,683 | 54 | 60,683 | 53 | 62,516 | 51 | 70,016 | 51 | 70,016 |
| Yu Delu | China | 52 | 65,188 | 49 | 69,088 | 51 | 66,897 | 50 | 67,397 | 52 | 64,110 | 50 | 63,660 | 52 | 69,019 | 52 | 69,819 |
| Jack Lisowski | England | 42 | 83,940 | 39 | 88,317 | 38 | 88,750 | 39 | 87,605 | 40 | 87,527 | 39 | 85,810 | 44 | 75,332 | 53 | 69,332 |
| Aditya Mehta | India | 49 | 68,350 | 51 | 66,939 | 49 | 67,356 | 54 | 57,965 | 53 | 60,961 | 49 | 64,128 | 53 | 68,041 | 54 | 68,041 |
| Li Hang | China | 85 | 24,894 | 70 | 26,811 | 68 | 33,394 | 66 | 45,994 | 65 | 45,994 | 65 | 48,694 | 60 | 56,194 | 55 | 65,194 |
| Kyren Wilson | England | 70 | 41,752 | 67 | 41,752 | 64 | 44,502 | 64 | 48,085 | 60 | 51,668 | 59 | 52,251 | 55 | 62,251 | 56 | 62,251 |
| Peter Lines | England | 61 | 50,220 | 62 | 51,120 | 61 | 49,729 | 61 | 49,729 | 59 | 53,529 | 62 | 49,618 | 62 | 55,618 | 57 | 61,618 |
| Anthony Hamilton | England | 51 | 66,805 | 47 | 72,155 | 44 | 71,371 | 48 | 68,367 | 49 | 67,863 | 51 | 63,394 | 54 | 63,699 | 58 | 61,399 |
| Tom Ford | England | 32 | 104,943 | 33 | 96,513 | 39 | 88,726 | 41 | 83,748 | 43 | 77,684 | 43 | 77,991 | 63 | 55,424 | 59 | 60,324 |
| Cao Yupeng | China | 46 | 72,205 | 44 | 74,192 | 45 | 70,555 | 55 | 57,655 | 63 | 50,347 | 63 | 49,447 | 65 | 53,447 | 60 | 59,447 |
| Robin Hull | Finland | 95 | 15,600 | 69 | 28,100 | 69 | 28,500 | 71 | 28,500 | 71 | 31,500 | 70 | 32,083 | 68 | 44,166 | 61 | 56,166 |
| Rory McLeod | England | 53 | 64,034 | 53 | 64,911 | 52 | 63,716 | 52 | 62,966 | 51 | 64,702 | 52 | 62,840 | 57 | 58,449 | 62 | 56,149 |
| Stuart Carrington | England | 79 | 31,677 | 68 | 32,566 | 67 | 35,066 | 69 | 35,649 | 68 | 37,566 | 69 | 38,816 | 69 | 43,733 | 63 | 55,733 |
| Joe Swail | Northern Ireland | 94 | 15,610 | 73 | 16,499 | 71 | 23,499 | 68 | 36,082 | 67 | 37,999 | 67 | 38,999 | 67 | 45,582 | 64 | 54,582 |
| Nigel Bond | England | 57 | 58,928 | 59 | 53,772 | 60 | 51,072 | 60 | 51,655 | 56 | 59,847 | 60 | 50,648 | 61 | 55,957 | 65 | 53,657 |
| Jamie Cope | England | 43 | 78,025 | 50 | 67,095 | 54 | 61,278 | 53 | 59,970 | 55 | 60,042 | 57 | 53,973 | 59 | 57,056 | 66 | 52,956 |
| Alfie Burden | England | 50 | 67,091 | 52 | 65,808 | 56 | 60,217 | 56 | 56,822 | 58 | 59,035 | 54 | 62,090 | 56 | 60,199 | 67 | 51,999 |
| Marcus Campbell | Scotland | 35 | 93,490 | 41 | 78,667 | 46 | 69,776 | 49 | 68,276 | 50 | 67,548 | 55 | 59,821 | 64 | 55,404 | 68 | 49,404 |
| Chris Wakelin | England | 106 | 8,249 | 74 | 14,749 | 72 | 19,416 | 73 | 19,999 | 72 | 23,332 | 73 | 23,332 | 70 | 41,415 | 69 | 47,415 |
| Jimmy White | England | 64 | 48,692 | 63 | 47,942 | 65 | 44,044 | 62 | 49,211 | 61 | 51,611 | 64 | 49,390 | 66 | 48,999 | 70 | 46,799 |
| Noppon Saengkham | Thailand | 84 | 24,938 | 71 | 25,538 | 70 | 28,288 | 70 | 35,488 | 69 | 35,488 | 68 | 38,821 | 71 | 38,821 | 71 | 44,821 |
| Sam Baird | England | | | 82 | 6,917 | 77 | 9,833 | 72 | 22,416 | 73 | 22,999 | 72 | 25,249 | 72 | 30,332 | 72 | 36,332 |
| Craig Steadman | England | | | 98 | 3,283 | 100 | 3,683 | 82 | 11,283 | 85 | 12,283 | 78 | 17,866 | 81 | 18,449 | 73 | 30,449 |
| Liam Highfield | England | | | 89 | 5,000 | 85 | 6,983 | 83 | 10,566 | 80 | 14,149 | 81 | 16,649 | 75 | 23,066 | 74 | 29,066 |
| Zhou Yuelong | China | | | 99 | 3,283 | 101 | 3,683 | 81 | 11,283 | 86 | 12,283 | 85 | 13,783 | 76 | 22,283 | 75 | 28,283 |
| Alex Davies | England | 96 | 14,694 | 75 | 14,694 | 74 | 17,194 | 75 | 17,194 | 77 | 17,194 | 77 | 18,194 | 77 | 22,194 | 76 | 28,194 |
| Fraser Patrick | Scotland | 119 | 1,749 | 85 | 5,349 | 82 | 7,266 | 86 | 8,266 | 75 | 18,266 | 75 | 20,099 | 78 | 22,099 | 77 | 28,099 |
| Oliver Lines | England | | | 95 | 4,083 | 98 | 4,083 | 79 | 13,083 | 81 | 13,666 | 82 | 15,916 | 79 | 21,833 | 78 | 27,833 |
| Dave Harold | England | 60 | 51,147 | 66 | 43,861 | 66 | 39,774 | 67 | 36,383 | 70 | 34,205 | 71 | 29,511 | 73 | 27,733 | 79 | 25,433 |
| Andrew Pagett | Wales | 103 | 8,916 | 78 | 9,333 | 78 | 9,333 | 78 | 13,333 | 82 | 13,333 | 84 | 14,583 | 83 | 17,583 | 80 | 23,583 |
| Lyu Haotian | China | 93 | 16,600 | 72 | 17,689 | 73 | 18,089 | 74 | 18,089 | 74 | 21,089 | 74 | 21,289 | 74 | 23,289 | 81 | 23,289 |
| Tian Pengfei | China | | | 113 | 200 | 87 | 5,283 | 94 | 6,783 | 97 | 7,366 | 91 | 9,616 | 85 | 17,116 | 82 | 23,116 |
| Zhang Anda | China | | | 111 | 600 | 115 | 600 | 118 | 600 | 106 | 4,183 | 103 | 5,633 | 98 | 9,216 | 83 | 21,216 |
| Igor Figueiredo | Brazil | 109 | 5,000 | 88 | 5,000 | 91 | 5,000 | 101 | 5,000 | 93 | 8,000 | 94 | 9,250 | 96 | 9,833 | 84 | 18,833 |
| James Cahill | England | 117 | 2,000 | 102 | 2,617 | 96 | 4,200 | 99 | 5,200 | 76 | 17,200 | 76 | 18,450 | 80 | 18,450 | 85 | 18,450 |
| John Astley | England | 98 | 14,110 | 76 | 14,527 | 75 | 16,277 | 76 | 16,277 | 78 | 16,277 | 79 | 16,860 | 82 | 18,360 | 86 | 18,360 |
| Joel Walker | England | | | 115 | 83 | 111 | 1,066 | 105 | 4,066 | 83 | 13,066 | 83 | 14,983 | 84 | 17,566 | 87 | 17,566 |
| Mitchell Mann | England | | | 126 | 0 | 127 | 0 | 89 | 7,783 | 95 | 7,783 | 98 | 8,366 | 100 | 8,366 | 88 | 17,366 |
| Ian Burns | England | | | 105 | 889 | 105 | 2,639 | 77 | 14,839 | 79 | 14,839 | 80 | 16,672 | 86 | 16,672 | 89 | 16,672 |
| Michael Georgiou | England | | | 83 | 6,700 | 84 | 7,100 | 92 | 7,100 | 96 | 7,683 | 89 | 10,183 | 87 | 15,766 | 90 | 15,766 |
| Elliot Slessor | England | 112 | 4,818 | 86 | 5,235 | 88 | 5,235 | 95 | 6,235 | 99 | 6,818 | 97 | 8,401 | 88 | 14,901 | 91 | 14,901 |
| Michael Wasley | England | | | 121 | 0 | 102 | 3,666 | 93 | 6,999 | 94 | 7,999 | 88 | 11,082 | 89 | 13,582 | 92 | 13,582 |
| Scott Donaldson | Scotland | | | 77 | 9,500 | 76 | 10,900 | 80 | 12,083 | 84 | 12,666 | 86 | 12,866 | 90 | 12,866 | 93 | 12,866 |
| Barry Pinches | England | | | 94 | 4,089 | 94 | 4,489 | 88 | 8,089 | 92 | 8,089 | 87 | 11,339 | 91 | 12,839 | 94 | 12,839 |
| Jak Jones | Wales | 128 | 0 | 114 | 83 | 106 | 2,066 | 110 | 2,066 | 111 | 2,649 | 112 | 2,649 | 112 | 2,649 | 95 | 11,649 |
| Chris Melling | England | | | 101 | 3,000 | 97 | 4,166 | 90 | 7,749 | 89 | 8,749 | 96 | 8,749 | 92 | 10,832 | 96 | 10,832 |
| Zak Surety | England | | | 123 | 0 | 124 | 0 | 106 | 3,583 | 107 | 3,583 | 109 | 3,583 | 93 | 10,666 | 97 | 10,666 |
| Tony Drago | Malta | | | 97 | 3,600 | 90 | 5,166 | 100 | 5,166 | 90 | 8,166 | 92 | 9,416 | 94 | 10,416 | 98 | 10,416 |
| Ross Muir | Scotland | 113 | 4,302 | 90 | 4,985 | 92 | 4,985 | 96 | 5,985 | 100 | 5,985 | 95 | 8,835 | 95 | 9,835 | 99 | 9,835 |
| Hammad Miah | England | 104 | 8,860 | 79 | 8,860 | 79 | 9,260 | 84 | 9,260 | 87 | 9,260 | 93 | 9,260 | 97 | 9,260 | 100 | 9,260 |
| Alex Borg | Malta | 107 | 6,166 | 84 | 6,166 | 83 | 7,149 | 91 | 7,149 | 98 | 7,149 | 100 | 7,149 | 99 | 8,649 | 101 | 8,649 |
| Andrew Norman | England | 110 | 4,960 | 81 | 8,160 | 81 | 8,160 | 87 | 8,160 | 91 | 8,160 | 99 | 8,160 | 101 | 8,160 | 102 | 8,160 |
| Thanawat Thirapongpaiboon | Thailand | | | 125 | 0 | 126 | 0 | 127 | 0 | 127 | 0 | 126 | 0 | 114 | 2,000 | 103 | 8,000 |
| Lee Walker | Wales | | | 117 | 83 | 117 | 483 | 120 | 483 | 120 | 483 | 121 | 483 | 115 | 1,983 | 104 | 7,983 |
| Michael Leslie | Scotland | | | 106 | 889 | 110 | 1,472 | 113 | 1,472 | 114 | 1,472 | 116 | 1,472 | 102 | 7,972 | 105 | 7,972 |
| Steve Davis | England | | | | | | | | | | | | | | | 106 | 6,583 |
| Allan Taylor | England | 123 | 833 | 104 | 1,250 | 104 | 2,816 | 108 | 3,399 | 109 | 3,399 | 107 | 4,399 | 103 | 6,399 | 107 | 6,399 |
| Lee Page | England | 122 | 1,260 | 92 | 4,460 | 93 | 4,860 | 102 | 4,860 | 101 | 5,860 | 101 | 5,860 | 104 | 5,860 | 108 | 5,860 |
| Chris Norbury | England | 108 | 5,167 | 87 | 5,167 | 89 | 5,167 | 97 | 5,750 | 102 | 5,750 | 102 | 5,750 | 105 | 5,750 | 109 | 5,750 |
| Ratchayothin Yotharuck | Thailand | 111 | 4,850 | 91 | 4,850 | 86 | 5,433 | 98 | 5,433 | 103 | 5,433 | 104 | 5,433 | 106 | 5,433 | 110 | 5,433 |
| David Grace | England | | | 96 | 4,000 | 99 | 4,000 | 103 | 4,583 | 104 | 5,166 | 105 | 5,166 | 107 | 5,166 | 111 | 5,166 |
| Cao Xinlong | China | 115 | 3,650 | 93 | 4,250 | 95 | 4,250 | 104 | 4,450 | 105 | 4,450 | 106 | 5,050 | 108 | 5,050 | 112 | 5,050 |
| Lu Chenwei | China | | | 100 | 3,200 | 103 | 3,200 | 107 | 3,400 | 108 | 3,400 | 108 | 3,600 | 109 | 3,600 | 113 | 3,600 |
| Lu Ning | China | | | 108 | 617 | 113 | 617 | 114 | 1,217 | 115 | 1,217 | 110 | 3,067 | 110 | 3,067 | 114 | 3,067 |
| Ian Glover | England | | | 110 | 600 | 109 | 1,600 | 109 | 2,383 | 110 | 2,966 | 111 | 2,966 | 111 | 2,966 | 115 | 2,966 |
| Steven Hallworth | England | | | 116 | 83 | 107 | 1,833 | 111 | 1,833 | 112 | 1,833 | 113 | 1,833 | 113 | 2,416 | 116 | 2,416 |
| Ahmed Saif | Qatar | 130 | 0 | 119 | 0 | 121 | 0 | 124 | 0 | 124 | 0 | 123 | 200 | 116 | 1,700 | 117 | 1,700 |
| Rouzi Maimaiti | China | | | 122 | 0 | 123 | 0 | 122 | 200 | 122 | 200 | 114 | 1,700 | 117 | 1,700 | 118 | 1,700 |
| Alexander Ursenbacher | Switzerland | 120 | 1,600 | 103 | 1,683 | 108 | 1,683 | 112 | 1,683 | 113 | 1,683 | 115 | 1,683 | 118 | 1,683 | 119 | 1,683 |
| Ju Reti | China | | | 112 | 200 | 119 | 200 | 115 | 800 | 116 | 800 | 117 | 1,400 | 119 | 1,400 | 120 | 1,400 |
| Ryan Clark | England | 124 | 694 | 107 | 694 | 112 | 694 | 116 | 694 | 117 | 694 | 118 | 694 | 120 | 694 | 121 | 694 |
| Liu Chuang | China | | | 109 | 600 | 114 | 600 | 117 | 600 | 118 | 600 | 119 | 600 | 121 | 600 | 122 | 600 |
| James Wattana | Thailand | | | | | | | | | | | | | | | 123 | 400 |
| Khaled Belaid Abumdas | Libya | 131 | 0 | 120 | 0 | 122 | 0 | 125 | 0 | 125 | 0 | 124 | 0 | 124 | 0 | 124 | 0 |
| Thor Chuan Leong | Malaysia | | | 124 | 0 | 125 | 0 | 126 | 0 | 126 | 0 | 125 | 0 | 125 | 0 | 125 | 0 |
| Hossein Vafaei | Iran | | | 127 | 0 | 128 | 0 | 128 | 0 | 128 | 0 | 127 | 0 | 126 | 0 | 126 | 0 |
| Steve Mifsud | Australia | | | 128 | 0 | 129 | 0 | 129 | 0 | 129 | 0 | 128 | 0 | 127 | 0 | 127 | 0 |
| Vinnie Calabrese (Note: Vinnie Calabrese has relinquished his Main Tour place after the Welsh Open.) | Australia | 105 | 8,700 | 80 | 8,700 | 80 | 9,100 | 85 | 9,100 | 88 | 9,100 | 90 | 9,683 | | | | |
| Lee Spick (Note: Lee Spick had died on 26 January 2015.) | England | 129 | 0 | 118 | 0 | 120 | 0 | 123 | 0 | 123 | 0 | | | | | | |
| Pankaj Advani (Note: Pankaj Advani has relinquished his Main Tour place just before the Shanghai Masters.) | India | 56 | 59,512 | 56 | 59,512 | | | | | | | | | | | | |
