= 2014 Wuxi Classic =

Sports Lottery Cup Wuxi Classic
Tournament information
- Dates: 23–29 June 2014
- Venue: Wuxi City Sports Park Stadium
- City: Wuxi
- Country: China
- Organisation: World Snooker
- Format: Ranking event
- Total prize fund: £478,000
- Winner's share: £85,000
- Highest break: Stephen Maguire (SCO) (145)

Final
- Champion: Neil Robertson (AUS)
- Runner-up: Joe Perry (ENG)
- Score: 10–9

The 2014 Sports Lottery Cup Wuxi Classic was a professional ranking snooker tournament held between 23 and 29 June 2014 at the Wuxi City Sports Park Stadium in Wuxi, China. It was the first ranking event of the 2014/2015 season.

Neil Robertson defended his title, which he won in 2013, by defeating Joe Perry 10–9 in the final. This was Robertson's 10th ranking title.

== Prize fund ==
The breakdown of prize money for this year is shown below:

- Winner: £85,000
- Runner-up: £35,000
- Semi-final: £21,000
- Quarter-final: £12,500
- Last 16: £8,000
- Last 32: £6,500
- Last 64: £3,000
- Televised highest break: £2,000
- Total: £478,000

== Wildcard round ==
These matches were played in Wuxi on 23 June 2014.

Match		Score	
WC1	Andrew Norman (ENG)	3–5	Zhao Xintong (CHN)
WC2	Yu Delu (CHN)	4–5	Yan Bingtao (CHN)
WC3	Scott Donaldson (SCO)	3–5	Chen Zifan (CHN)
WC4	Robbie Williams (ENG)	5–1	Niu Zhuang (CHN)

== Main draw ==
Last 64; Best of 9 frames
(Australia) Neil Robertson	w/o
(Switzerland) Alexander Ursenbacher	w/d
(England) Michael Georgiou	5
(Scotland) Marcus Campbell	1
(England) Michael Holt	5
(England) Rory McLeod	4
(Scotland) Fraser Patrick	3
(England) Sam Baird	5
(England) Chris Melling	1
(China) Zhao Xintong	5
(England) Jack Lisowski	5
(China) Lu Chenwei	2
(England) Chris Wakelin	5
(England) Joe O'Connor	2
(England) Rod Lawler	1
(England) Shaun Murphy	5
(Hong Kong) Marco Fu	5
(England) Craig Steadman	2
(Wales) Jamie Jones	5
(Republic of Ireland) Ken Doherty	2
(Norway) Kurt Maflin	1
(England) Anthony Hamilton	5
(Malta) Tony Drago	2
(England) Stuart Bingham	5
(Scotland) John Higgins	5
(Scotland) Anthony McGill	3
(England) Gary Wilson	3
(Scotland) Alan McManus	5
(England) Barry Pinches	1
(China) Yan Bingtao	5
(England) Lee Page	0
(England) Barry Hawkins	5
(England) Oliver Brown	5
(England) Oliver Lines	1
(England) Michael Tomlinson	1
(England) Martin Gould	5
(Wales) Ryan Day	5
(England) Matthew Selt	0
(England) Mark Joyce	1
(Wales) Mark Williams	5
(Scotland) Stephen Maguire	5
(England) David Gilbert	3
(England) Jamie Cope	3
(Wales) Michael White	5
(Republic of Ireland) Fergal O'Brien	4
(England) Ben Woollaston	5
(England) David Grace	1
(England) Judd Trump	5
(England) Ricky Walden	5
(England) Peter Lines	0
(China) Cao Yupeng	5
(England) Mark King	1
(China) Xiao Guodong	3
(Finland) Robin Hull	5
(China) Zhou Yuelong	3
(Scotland) Graeme Dott	5
(England) Joe Perry	5
(China) Chen Zifan	0
(Republic of Ireland) David Morris	4
(England) Robert Milkins	5
(China) Liang Wenbo	5
(Scotland) Jamie Burnett	1
(England) Robbie Williams	1
(England) Mark Selby	5

Last 32; Best of 9 frames
(Australia) Neil Robertson	5
(England) Michael Georgiou	3
(England) Michael Holt	5
(England) Sam Baird	2
(China) Zhao Xintong	5
(England) Jack Lisowski	2
(England) Chris Wakelin	2
(England) Shaun Murphy	5
(Hong Kong) Marco Fu	5
(Wales) Jamie Jones	3
(England) Anthony Hamilton	4
(England) Stuart Bingham	5
(Scotland) John Higgins	4
(Scotland) Alan McManus	5
(China) Yan Bingtao	4
(England) Barry Hawkins	5
(England) Oliver Brown	1
(England) Martin Gould	5
(Wales) Ryan Day	5
(Wales) Mark Williams	2
(Scotland) Stephen Maguire	5
(Wales) Michael White	3
(England) Ben Woollaston	3
(England) Judd Trump	5
(England) Ricky Walden	3
(China) Cao Yupeng	5
(Finland) Robin Hull	5
(Scotland) Graeme Dott	3
(England) Joe Perry	5
(England) Robert Milkins	0
(China) Liang Wenbo	5
(England) Mark Selby	3

Last 16; Best of 9 frames
(Australia) Neil Robertson	5
(England) Michael Holt	1
(China) Zhao Xintong	2
(England) Shaun Murphy	5
(Hong Kong) Marco Fu	5
(England) Stuart Bingham	4
(Scotland) Alan McManus	2
(England) Barry Hawkins	5
(England) Martin Gould	5
(Wales) Ryan Day	3
(Scotland) Stephen Maguire	5
(England) Judd Trump	0
(China) Cao Yupeng	1
(Finland) Robin Hull	5
(England) Joe Perry	5
(China) Liang Wenbo	2

Quarter-finals; Best of 9 frames
(Australia) Neil Robertson	5
(England) Shaun Murphy	4
(Hong Kong) Marco Fu	4
(England) Barry Hawkins	5
(England) Martin Gould	5
(Scotland) Stephen Maguire	4
(Finland) Robin Hull	2
(England) Joe Perry	5

Semi-finals; Best of 11 frames
(Australia) Neil Robertson	6
(England) Barry Hawkins	3
(England) Martin Gould	4
(England) Joe Perry	6

Final; Best of 19 frames
(Australia) Neil Robertson	10
(England) Joe Perry	9

== Final ==
Final: Best of 19 frames. Referee: Leo Scullion. Wuxi City Sports Park Stadium, Wuxi, China, 29 June 2014.
Neil Robertson; Australia	10–9	Joe Perry; England
Afternoon: 49–61, 9–76, 21–62 (56), 78–6, 70–33, 0–135 (74, 61), 79–1 (72), 21–87, 55–52; Evening: 81–0, 25–72 (68), 72–31, 76–0, 69–44, 18–92 (54), 60–64, 0–93 (93), 87–0 (87), 78–14 (78)
87	Highest break	93
0	Century breaks	0
3	50+ breaks	6

== Qualifying ==
These matches were held between 24 and 28 May 2014 at The Capital Venue in Gloucester, England. All matches were best of 9 frames.

(Australia) Neil Robertson	5–1	(England) Steven Hallworth
(England) Kyren Wilson	4–5	(Switzerland) Alexander Ursenbacher
(India) Aditya Mehta	0–5	(England) Michael Georgiou
(Scotland) Marcus Campbell	5–1	(Wales) Daniel Wells
(England) Michael Holt	5–2	(England) Hammad Miah
(England) Rory McLeod	5–4	(England) Ashley Carty
(England) Jimmy White	2–5	(Scotland) Fraser Patrick
(England) Ali Carter	w/d–w/o	(England) Sam Baird
(Wales) Matthew Stevens	4–5	(England) Chris Melling
(Thailand) Dechawat Poomjaeng	w/d–w/o	(England) Andrew Norman
(England) Jack Lisowski	5–3	(China) Lu Ning
(Wales) Dominic Dale	2–5	(China) Lu Chenwei
(England) Tom Ford	2–5	(England) Chris Wakelin
(England) Andrew Higginson	0–5	(England) Joe O'Connor
(England) Rod Lawler	5–3	(Australia) Vinnie Calabrese
(England) Shaun Murphy	5–2	(England) Ryan Clark
(Hong Kong) Marco Fu	5–0	(England) Jamie O'Neill
(Belgium) Luca Brecel	4–5	(England) Craig Steadman
(Wales) Jamie Jones	5–2	(England) Zak Surety
(Republic of Ireland) Ken Doherty	w/o–w/d	(Thailand) Ratchayothin Yotharuck
(Norway) Kurt Maflin	5–2	(England) George Pragnall
(England) Anthony Hamilton	5–2	(Wales) Andrew Pagett
(England) Mike Dunn	3–5	(Malta) Tony Drago
(England) Stuart Bingham	5–3	(England) James Cahill
(Scotland) John Higgins	5–1	(England) Michael Wasley
(Scotland) Anthony McGill	5–3	(Malta) Alex Borg
(England) Gary Wilson	5–2	(Scotland) Michael Leslie
(Scotland) Alan McManus	5–4	(China) Cao Xinlong
(England) Peter Ebdon	4–5	(England) Barry Pinches
(China) Yu Delu	5–0	(England) Allan Taylor
(Northern Ireland) Gerard Greene	1–5	(England) Lee Page
(England) Barry Hawkins	5–0	(England) Matthew Day

(China) Ding Junhui	0–5	(England) Oliver Brown
(England) Dave Harold	4–5	(England) Oliver Lines
(England) Nigel Bond	4–5	(England) Michael Tomlinson
(England) Martin Gould	5–1	(England) Adam Duffy
(Wales) Ryan Day	5–3	(China) Li Hang
(England) Matthew Selt	5–4	(England) Sydney Wilson
(England) Mark Joyce	5–4	(England) Alex Davies
(Wales) Mark Williams	5–3	(England) Elliot Slessor
(Scotland) Stephen Maguire	5–0	(Canada) Alex Pagulayan
(England) David Gilbert	5–2	(England) Sean O'Sullivan
(England) Jamie Cope	5–1	(Scotland) Ross Muir
(Wales) Michael White	5–2	(Republic of Ireland) John Sutton
(Republic of Ireland) Fergal O'Brien	w/o–w/d	(Thailand) Noppon Saengkham
(England) Ben Woollaston	5–2	(China) Lyu Haotian
(England) Jimmy Robertson	4–5	(England) David Grace
(England) Judd Trump	5–3	(England) Joel Walker
(England) Ricky Walden	5–4	(Northern Ireland) Joe Swail
(England) Peter Lines	5–0	(China) Liu Chuang
(China) Cao Yupeng	5–2	(China) Wang Zepeng
(England) Mark King	5–3	(Wales) Lee Walker
(China) Xiao Guodong	5–4	(England) Liam Highfield
(Thailand) Thepchaiya Un-Nooh	w/d–w/o	(Finland) Robin Hull
(England) Alfie Burden	3–5	(China) Zhou Yuelong
(Scotland) Graeme Dott	5–3	(Scotland) Eden Sharav
(England) Joe Perry	5–1	(Wales) Jak Jones
(England) Stuart Carrington	2–5	(Scotland) Scott Donaldson
(Republic of Ireland) David Morris	5–3	(England) Ian Burns
(England) Robert Milkins	5–3	(England) Chris Norbury
(China) Liang Wenbo	5–2	(England) Ian Glover
(Scotland) Jamie Burnett	5–3	(Wales) Jamie Clarke
(England) Robbie Williams	5–2	(Scotland) Mark Owens
(England) Mark Selby	5–0	(England) John Astley

== Century breaks ==
=== Qualifying stage centuries ===
- 137 – Neil Robertson
- 136, 131 – Michael Holt
- 136 – Chris Wakelin
- 130 – David Grace
- 125, 105 – Judd Trump
- 120 – David Morris
- 117 – Barry Pinches
- 116 – Yu Delu
- 115 – Alexander Ursenbacher
- 111 – Matthew Selt
- 106 – Joel Walker
- 104 – Kurt Maflin
- 103 – Michael White
- 102 – Dave Harold
- 101 – Anthony McGill
- 101 – Stuart Bingham

=== Televised stage centuries ===
- 145, 118, 102 – Stephen Maguire
- 139, 134, 101 – Robin Hull
- 138 – Barry Hawkins
- 137 – Joe Perry
- 135 – Ken Doherty
- 130, 128, 105 – Neil Robertson
- 128, 111, 105, 100 – Marco Fu
- 128, 105, 101, 100 – Liang Wenbo
- 123, 119 – Mark Selby
- 122 – Martin Gould
- 122 – John Higgins
- 116 – Judd Trump
- 114 – Michael Holt
- 104 – Rory McLeod
