= 2013 Q School =

Snooker tournaments

Tournament information
- Dates: 11–22 May 2013
- Venue: World Snooker Academy
- City: Sheffield
- Country: England
- Format: Qualifying School
- Qualifiers: 12 via the 3 events

The 2013 Q School was a series of three snooker tournaments held at the start of the 2013–14 snooker season. An event for amateur players, it served as a qualification event for a place on the professional World Snooker Tour for the following two seasons. The events took place in May 2013 at the World Snooker Academy in Sheffield, England with a total 12 players qualifying via the three tournaments.

== Format ==
The 2013 Q School consisted of three events with 12 qualification places available. The three events had 110 entries competing for the 12 places on the main tour, four players qualifying from each of the three events. All matches were the best of seven frames.

== Event 1 ==
The first 2013 Q School event was held from 11 to 14 May 2013. Elliot Slessor, Alex Davies, Lee Page and Hammad Miah qualified. The results of the four final matches are given below.

- Elliot Slessor (ENG) 4–0 Chris Wakelin (ENG)
- Alex Davies (ENG) 4–1 Mitchell Travis (ENG)
- Lee Page (ENG) 4–0 Gareth Green (ENG)
- Hammad Miah (ENG) 4–1 Kishan Hirani (WAL)

== Event 2 ==
The second 2013 Q School event was held from 15 to 18 May 2013. Ahmed Saif, Ross Muir, Ryan Clark and Alexander Ursenbacher qualified. The results of the four final matches are given below.

- Ahmed Saif (QAT) 4–1 Jamie Clarke (WAL)
- Ross Muir (SCO) 4–0 David Morris (IRL)
- Ryan Clark (ENG) 4–1 Zak Surety (ENG)
- Alexander Ursenbacher (SUI) 4–0 Paul Wykes (ENG)

== Event 3 ==
The third 2013 Q School event was held from 19 to 22 May 2013. David Morris, Lee Spick, Chris Wakelin and Fraser Patrick qualified. The results of the four final matches are given below.

- David Morris (IRL) 4–1 Gareth Green (ENG)
- Lee Spick (ENG) 4–2 Duane Jones (WAL)
- Chris Wakelin (ENG) 4–2 Adam Wicheard (ENG)
- Fraser Patrick (SCO) 4–3 Ashley Carty (ENG)

== Q School Order of Merit ==
A Q School Order of Merit was produced for players who didn't qualify from the three events. The Order of Merit was used to top up fields for the 2013–14 snooker season where an event failed to attract the required number of entries. The rankings in the Order of Merit were based on the number of frames won in the three Q School events. Players who received a bye into the second round were awarded four points for round one. Where players were equal, those who won the most frames in the first event were ranked higher and, if still equal, the player with the most frames in event two.

The leading players in the Q School Order of Merit are given below.

| Rank | Player | Event 1 | Event 2 | Event 3 | Total |
|---|---|---|---|---|---|
| 1 | (England) Adam Wicheard | 14 | 8 | 18 | 40 |
| 2 | (England) Mitchell Travis | 17 | 12 | 9 | 38 |
| 3 | (England) Gareth Green | 16 | 2 | 17 | 35 |
| 4 | (Wales) Duane Jones | 9 | 7 | 18 | 34 |
| 5 | (England) Sanderson Lam | 13 | 10 | 10 | 33 |
| 6 | (England) Zak Surety | 4 | 17 | 11 | 32 |
| 7 | (England) Ashley Carty | 5 | 7 | 19 | 31 |
| 8 | (England) Antony Parsons | 3 | 14 | 14 | 31 |
| 9 | (England) Darren Cook | 13 | 2 | 15 | 30 |
| 10 | (Republic of Ireland) Josh Boileau | 11 | 6 | 13 | 30 |

== Two-season performance of qualifiers ==
The following table shows the rankings of the 12 qualifiers from the 2013 Q School, at the end of the 2014–15 snooker season, the end of their two guaranteed seasons on the tour, together with their tour status for the 2015–16 snooker season. Players in the top-64 of the rankings retained their place on the tour while those outside the top-64 lost their place unless they qualified under a different category.

| Player | End of 2014–15 season | | Status for 2015–16 season |
| Player | Money | Ranking | Status for 2015–16 season |
|---|---|---|---|
| Elliot Slessor (ENG) | 14,901 | 91 | Amateur |
| Alex Davies (ENG) | 28,194 | 76 | Amateur |
| Lee Page (ENG) | 5,860 | 108 | Amateur |
| Hammad Miah (ENG) | 9,260 | 100 | Amateur |
| Ahmed Saif (QAT) | 1,700 | 117 | Amateur |
| Ross Muir (SCO) | 9,835 | 99 | Qualified through the Asian Tour Order of Merit |
| Ryan Clark (ENG) | 694 | 121 | Amateur |
| Alexander Ursenbacher (SUI) | 1,683 | 119 | Amateur |
| David Morris (IRL) | 70,016 | 51 | Retained place on tour |
| Lee Spick (ENG) | – | – | Died in January 2015 |
| Chris Wakelin (ENG) | 47,415 | 69 | Amateur |
| Fraser Patrick (SCO) | 28,099 | 77 | Qualified through the European Tour Order of Merit |
