= 2014 Welsh Open (snooker) =

2014 BetVictor Welsh Open

Tournament information
- Dates: 19 February – 2 March 2014
- Venue: Newport Centre
- City: Newport
- Country: Wales
- Organisation: World Snooker
- Format: Ranking event
- Total prize fund: £310,000
- Winner's share: £60,000
- Highest break: Ronnie O'Sullivan (ENG) (147)

Final
- Champion: Ronnie O'Sullivan (ENG)
- Runner-up: Ding Junhui (CHN)
- Score: 9–3

The 2014 Welsh Open (officially the 2014 BetVictor Welsh Open) was a professional ranking snooker tournament that took place between 19 February and 2 March 2014 at the Newport Centre in Newport, Wales. It was the eighth ranking event of the 2013/2014 season, and the second time that BetVictor sponsored the event.

Stephen Maguire was the defending champion, but he lost 3–4 against Joel Walker in the last 16.

Ronnie O'Sullivan won his 26th ranking title by defeating Ding Junhui 9–3 in the final. This was O'Sullivan's third Welsh Open title after 2004 and 2005, to equal the record jointly held by John Higgins and Stephen Hendry. In the last frame of the final O'Sullivan made the 105th official maximum break. This was O'Sullivan's record 12th competitive maximum break.

== Prize fund ==
The total prize money of the event was raised to £300,000 from the previous year's £250,000. The breakdown of prize money for this year is shown below:

- Winner: £60,000
- Runner-up: £30,000
- Semi-finals: £20,000
- Quarter-finals: £10,000
- Last 16: £5,000
- Last 32: £2,500
- Last 64: £1,500
- Highest break: £2,000
- Maximum break: £10,000
- Total: £310,000

== Main draw ==
=== Top half ===
==== Section 1 ====
Last 128; Best of 7 frames
Stephen Maguire (SCO) (1)	4
Elliot Slessor (ENG)	1
Robbie Williams (ENG)	2
Sam Baird (ENG)	4
Gerard Greene (NIR)	4
Li Yan (CHN)	2
Marcus Campbell (SCO)	0
Andrew Pagett (WAL)	4
Tom Ford (ENG)	4
Gareth Green (ENG)	0
Rod Lawler (ENG)	2
James Wattana (THA)	4
Pankaj Advani (IND)	3
Joel Walker (ENG)	4
Mark Davis (ENG) (14)	4
Alexander Ursenbacher (SUI)	3

Last 64; Best of 7 frames
(Scotland) Stephen Maguire (1)	4
(England) Sam Baird	3
(Northern Ireland) Gerard Greene	3
(Wales) Andrew Pagett	4
(England) Tom Ford	2
(Thailand) James Wattana	4
(England) Joel Walker	4
(England) Mark Davis (14)	3

Last 32; Best of 7 frames
(Scotland) Stephen Maguire (1)	4
(Wales) Andrew Pagett	0
(Thailand) James Wattana	1
(England) Joel Walker	4

Last 16; Best of 7 frames
(Scotland) Stephen Maguire (1)	3
(England) Joel Walker	4

==== Section 2 ====
Last 128; Best of 7 frames
Robert Milkins (ENG) (15)	2
Scott Donaldson (SCO)	4
David Gilbert (ENG)	4
Duane Jones (WAL)	2
Jimmy Robertson (ENG)	4
Luca Brecel (BEL)	2
Andrew Higginson (ENG)	4
Martin O'Donnell (ENG)	1
Ben Woollaston (ENG)	4
Vinnie Calabrese (AUS)	0
Alfie Burden (ENG)	4
Ahmed Saif (QAT)	0
Jamie Cope (ENG)	4
Ryan Clark (ENG)	1
Ding Junhui (CHN) (5)	4
Gary Wilson (ENG)	2

Last 64; Best of 7 frames
(Scotland) Scott Donaldson	4
(England) David Gilbert	1
(England) Jimmy Robertson	3
(England) Andrew Higginson	4
(England) Ben Woollaston	4
(England) Alfie Burden	1
(England) Jamie Cope	1
(China) Ding Junhui (5)	4

Last 32; Best of 7 frames
(Scotland) Scott Donaldson	4
(England) Andrew Higginson	3
(England) Ben Woollaston	3
(China) Ding Junhui (5)	4

Last 16; Best of 7 frames
(Scotland) Scott Donaldson	0
(China) Ding Junhui (5)	4

==== Section 3 ====
Last 128; Best of 7 frames
Stuart Bingham (ENG) (8)	4
Daniel Wells (WAL)	0
Jimmy White (ENG)	0
Thepchaiya Un-Nooh (THA)	4
Peter Lines (ENG)	4
Ross Muir (SCO)	3
Michael Holt (ENG)	4
Stuart Carrington (ENG)	2
Matthew Stevens (WAL)	4
Adam Wicheard (ENG)	3
Yu Delu (CHN)	3
Ian Burns (ENG)	4
Liu Chuang (CHN)	4
Chen Zhe (CHN)	2
Joe Perry (ENG) (16)	4
Allan Taylor (ENG)	3

Last 64; Best of 7 frames
(England) Stuart Bingham (8)	4
(Thailand) Thepchaiya Un-Nooh	2
(England) Peter Lines	2
(England) Michael Holt	4
(Wales) Matthew Stevens	4
(England) Ian Burns	2
(China) Liu Chuang	0
(England) Joe Perry (16)	4

Last 32; Best of 7 frames
(England) Stuart Bingham (8)	4
(England) Michael Holt	2
(Wales) Matthew Stevens	3
(England) Joe Perry (16)	4

Last 16; Best of 7 frames
(England) Stuart Bingham (8)	3
(England) Joe Perry (16)	4

==== Section 4 ====
Last 128; Best of 7 frames
Mark Allen (NIR) (12)	4
Sydney Wilson (ENG)	3
Steve Davis (ENG)	0
Noppon Saengkham (THA)	4
Aditya Mehta (IND)	3
Mike Dunn (ENG)	4
Ali Carter (ENG)	4
Andrew Norman (ENG)	1
Dominic Dale (WAL)	4
Antony Parsons (ENG)	3
Dechawat Poomjaeng (THA)	4
Liam Highfield (ENG)	1
Dave Harold (ENG)	4
Zhang Anda (CHN)	2
Mark Selby (ENG) (4)	4
Joe Swail (NIR)	0

Last 64; Best of 7 frames
(Northern Ireland) Mark Allen (12)	4
(Thailand) Noppon Saengkham	2
(England) Mike Dunn	3
(England) Ali Carter	4
(Wales) Dominic Dale	4
(Thailand) Dechawat Poomjaeng	1
(England) Dave Harold	1
(England) Mark Selby (4)	4

Last 32; Best of 7 frames
(Northern Ireland) Mark Allen (12)	2
(England) Ali Carter	4
(Wales) Dominic Dale	0
(England) Mark Selby (4)	4

Last 16; Best of 7 frames
(England) Ali Carter	1
(England) Mark Selby (4)	4

=== Bottom half ===
==== Section 5 ====
Last 128; Best of 7 frames
Neil Robertson (AUS) (3)	4
Lyu Haotian (CHN)	1
Rory McLeod (ENG)	4
Dylan Mitchell (ENG)	1
Tian Pengfei (CHN)	4
Alex Borg (MLT)	1
Mark Williams (WAL)	4
Michael Wasley (ENG)	3
Graeme Dott (SCO)	4
Lee Page (ENG)	0
Jamie Jones (WAL)	4
Cao Xinlong (CHN)	0
Kurt Maflin (NOR)	4
Alex Davies (ENG)	1
Marco Fu (HKG) (10)	4
Chris Norbury (ENG)	2

Last 64; Best of 7 frames
(Australia) Neil Robertson (3)	4
(England) Rory McLeod	0
(China) Tian Pengfei	0
(Wales) Mark Williams	4
(Scotland) Graeme Dott	4
(Wales) Jamie Jones	3
(Norway) Kurt Maflin	1
(Hong Kong) Marco Fu (10)	4

Last 32; Best of 7 frames
(Australia) Neil Robertson (3)	3
(Wales) Mark Williams	4
(Scotland) Graeme Dott	2
(Hong Kong) Marco Fu (10)	4

Last 16; Best of 7 frames
(Wales) Mark Williams	2
(Hong Kong) Marco Fu (10)	4

==== Section 6 ====
Last 128; Best of 7 frames
Shaun Murphy (ENG) (9)	4
David Morris (IRL)	0
Mark Joyce (ENG)	2
Craig Steadman (ENG)	4
Fergal O'Brien (IRL)	4
Sanderson Lam (ENG)	1
Liang Wenbo (CHN)	4
Jak Jones (WAL)	2
Martin Gould (ENG)	4
Thanawat Thirapongpaiboon (THA)	0
Jack Lisowski (ENG)	4
Adam Duffy (ENG)	0
Cao Yupeng (CHN)	4
David Grace (ENG)	2
Barry Hawkins (ENG) (7)	4
Fraser Patrick (SCO)	0

Last 64; Best of 7 frames
(England) Shaun Murphy (9)	4
(England) Craig Steadman	2
(Republic of Ireland) Fergal O'Brien	0
(China) Liang Wenbo	4
(England) Martin Gould	1
(England) Jack Lisowski	4
(China) Cao Yupeng	3
(England) Barry Hawkins (7)	4

Last 32; Best of 7 frames
(England) Shaun Murphy (9)	3
(China) Liang Wenbo	4
(England) Jack Lisowski	3
(England) Barry Hawkins (7)	4

Last 16; Best of 7 frames
(China) Liang Wenbo	2
(England) Barry Hawkins (7)	4

==== Section 7 ====
Last 128; Best of 7 frames
Judd Trump (ENG) (6)	4
Kyren Wilson (ENG)	2
Jamie Burnett (SCO)	4
Ratchayothin Yotharuck (THA)	2
Anthony McGill (SCO)	4
Jamie O'Neill (ENG)	2
Ryan Day (WAL)	4
Rhys Clark (SCO)	2
Mark King (ENG)	4
Sean O'Sullivan (ENG)	3
Alan McManus (SCO)	4
John Astley (ENG)	2
Ken Doherty (IRL)	4
James Cahill (ENG)	0
John Higgins (SCO) (11)	4
Tony Drago (MLT)	0

Last 64; Best of 7 frames
(England) Judd Trump (6)	4
(Scotland) Jamie Burnett	1
(Scotland) Anthony McGill	4
(Wales) Ryan Day	1
(England) Mark King	4
(Scotland) Alan McManus	2
(Republic of Ireland) Ken Doherty	0
(Scotland) John Higgins (11)	4

Last 32; Best of 7 frames
(England) Judd Trump (6)	4
(Scotland) Anthony McGill	1
(England) Mark King	0
(Scotland) John Higgins (11)	4

Last 16; Best of 7 frames
(England) Judd Trump (6)	3
(Scotland) John Higgins (11)	4

==== Section 8 ====
Last 128; Best of 7 frames
Ricky Walden (ENG) (13)	4
Paul Davison (ENG)	1
Matthew Selt (ENG)	4
Khaled Belaid Abumdas (LBY)	1
Anthony Hamilton (ENG)	4
Michael Leslie (SCO)	2
Peter Ebdon (ENG)	0
Li Hang (CHN)	4
Xiao Guodong (CHN)	4
Hammad Miah (ENG)	3
Michael White (WAL)	4
Chris Wakelin (ENG)	3
Nigel Bond (ENG)	1
Barry Pinches (ENG)	4
Ronnie O'Sullivan (ENG) (2)	4
Mitchell Travis (ENG)	1

Last 64; Best of 7 frames
(England) Ricky Walden (13)	4
(England) Matthew Selt	2
(England) Anthony Hamilton	4
(China) Li Hang	1
(China) Xiao Guodong	4
(Wales) Michael White	3
(England) Barry Pinches	1
(England) Ronnie O'Sullivan (2)	4

Last 32; Best of 7 frames
(England) Ricky Walden (13)	4
(England) Anthony Hamilton	2
(China) Xiao Guodong	1
(England) Ronnie O'Sullivan (2)	4

Last 16; Best of 7 frames
(England) Ricky Walden (13)	1
(England) Ronnie O'Sullivan (2)	4

=== Finals ===
Quarter-finals; Best of 9 frames
(England) Joel Walker	4
(China) Ding Junhui (5)	5
(England) Joe Perry (16)	5
(England) Mark Selby (4)	1
(Hong Kong) Marco Fu (10)	0
(England) Barry Hawkins (7)	5
(Scotland) John Higgins (11)	1
(England) Ronnie O'Sullivan (2)	5

Semi-finals; Best of 11 frames
(China) Ding Junhui (5)	6
(England) Joe Perry (16)	4
(England) Barry Hawkins (7)	2
(England) Ronnie O'Sullivan (2)	6

Final; Best of 17 frames
(China) Ding Junhui (5)	3
(England) Ronnie O'Sullivan (2)	9

== Final ==
Final: Best of 17 frames. Referee: Leo Scullion. Newport Centre, Newport, Wales, 2 March 2014.
Ding Junhui (5); China	3–9	Ronnie O'Sullivan (2); England
Afternoon: 36–70, 8–91 (91), 15–75 (70), 62–55, 59–68 (Ding 55), 0–92 (92), 48–59, 52–80; Evening: 109–30 (109), 121–0 (121), 13–105, 0–147 (147)
121	Highest break	147
2	Century breaks	1
3	50+ breaks	4

== Century breaks ==
- 147, 124, 115, 114, 104, 103, 103, 100 – Ronnie O'Sullivan
- 142 – Shaun Murphy
- 139, 128, 121, 121, 118, 114, 109, 108, 104 – Ding Junhui
- 139 – Michael White
- 137 – John Higgins
- 134, 134, 125, 102 – Barry Hawkins
- 131, 100 – Judd Trump
- 126 – Jamie Burnett
- 121, 114, 108 – Cao Yupeng
- 118 – Scott Donaldson
- 116 – Anthony McGill
- 115 – Ali Carter
- 115 – Joe Perry
- 114 – Jamie Cope
- 114 – Ross Muir
- 114 – Mark Joyce
- 113, 113 – Liang Wenbo
- 112, 106, 101 – Mark Allen
- 112, 104 – Neil Robertson
- 111 – Ken Doherty
- 108 – Mark Williams
- 103 – Marco Fu
- 102 – Noppon Saengkham
- 102 – Stuart Bingham
- 101 – Mark King
- 101 – Joel Walker
- 100 – Andrew Higginson
- 100 – Martin Gould
- 100 – Ben Woollaston
