= 2013 UK Championship =

Snooker tournament

2013 williamhill.com UK Championship

Tournament information
- Dates: 26 November – 8 December 2013
- Venue: Barbican Centre
- City: York
- Country: England
- Organisation: World Snooker
- Format: Ranking event
- Total prize fund: £755,000
- Winner's share: £150,000
- Highest break: Mark Selby (ENG) (147)

Final
- Champion: Neil Robertson (AUS)
- Runner-up: Mark Selby (ENG)
- Score: 10–7

The 2013 UK Championship (officially the 2013 williamhill.com UK Championship) was a professional ranking snooker tournament that took place between 26 November–8 December 2013 at the Barbican Centre in York, England. It was the sixth ranking event of the 2013/2014 season.

Mark Selby made the 100th official maximum break during his semi-final match against Ricky Walden. This was Selby's second official 147 break and the third maximum break in the 2013/2014 season.

Neil Robertson won his ninth ranking title by defeating defending champion Selby 10–7 in the final, despite trailing 1–5 and 3–6 during the match. Robertson became the eighth player to win all Triple Crown events at least once, and the first overseas player to achieve this feat. Selby became the first defending champion to reach the final of the UK Championship since Mark Williams in 2000.

== Prize fund ==
The total prize money of the event was raised to £700,000 from the previous year's £625,000. The breakdown of prize money for this year is shown below:

- Winner: £150,000
- Runner-up: £70,000
- Semi-final: £30,000
- Quarter-final: £20,000
- Last 16: £12,000
- Last 32: £9,000
- Last 64: £3,000
- Highest break: £4,000
- Maximum break: £55,000
- Total: £755,000

== Main draw ==
=== Top half ===
==== Section 1 ====
Last 128; Best of 11 frames
1	Mark Selby (ENG)	6
A	Shane Castle (ENG)	4
64	Tian Pengfei (CHN)	6
65	Pankaj Advani (IND)	1
32	Ken Doherty (IRL)	5
97	John Astley (ENG)	6
33	Ben Woollaston (ENG)	2
96	Stuart Carrington (ENG)	6
16	Graeme Dott (SCO)	6
113	Fraser Patrick (SCO)	2
49	Nigel Bond (ENG)	6
80	Craig Steadman (ENG)	3
17	Ali Carter (ENG)	6
112	Ratchayothin Yotharuck (THA)	1
48	Jimmy Robertson (ENG)	6
81	Li Yan (CHN)	3

Last 64; Best of 11 frames
1	(England) Mark Selby	6
64	(China) Tian Pengfei	3
97	(England) John Astley	1
96	(England) Stuart Carrington	6
16	(Scotland) Graeme Dott	6
49	(England) Nigel Bond	5
17	(England) Ali Carter	6
48	(England) Jimmy Robertson	0

Last 32; Best of 11 frames
1	(England) Mark Selby	6
96	(England) Stuart Carrington	0
16	(Scotland) Graeme Dott	6
17	(England) Ali Carter	3

Last 16; Best of 11 frames
1	(England) Mark Selby	6
16	(Scotland) Graeme Dott	2

==== Section 2 ====
Last 128; Best of 11 frames
41	Jamie Jones (WAL)	0
88	Gary Wilson (ENG)	6
24	Dominic Dale (WAL)	5
105	Vinnie Calabrese (AUS)	6
56	Cao Yupeng (CHN)	3
73	Zhang Anda (CHN)	6
9	Barry Hawkins (ENG)	6
120	Alexander Ursenbacher (SUI)	0
40	Anthony Hamilton (ENG)	4
89	Sean O'Sullivan (ENG)	6
25	Tom Ford (ENG)	2
104	Noppon Saengkham (THA)	6
57	Gerard Greene (NIR)	4
72	Paul Davison (ENG)	6
8	Shaun Murphy (ENG)	w/o
121	Lee Spick (ENG)	w/d

Last 64; Best of 11 frames
88	(England) Gary Wilson	6
105	(Australia) Vinnie Calabrese	3
73	(China) Zhang Anda	3
9	(England) Barry Hawkins	6
89	(England) Sean O'Sullivan	4
104	(Thailand) Noppon Saengkham	6
72	(England) Paul Davison	3
8	(England) Shaun Murphy	6

Last 32; Best of 11 frames
88	(England) Gary Wilson	4
9	(England) Barry Hawkins	6
104	(Thailand) Noppon Saengkham	2
8	(England) Shaun Murphy	6

Last 16; Best of 11 frames
9	(England) Barry Hawkins	6
8	(England) Shaun Murphy	5

==== Section 3 ====
Last 128; Best of 11 frames
5	Judd Trump (ENG)	6
A	Gareth Green (ENG)	2
60	Dechawat Poomjaeng (THA)	6
69	Thepchaiya Un-Nooh (THA)	5
28	Xiao Guodong (CHN)	6
101	Andrew Pagett (WAL)	1
37	Mark Joyce (ENG)	2
92	Jamie O'Neill (ENG)	6
12	Mark Allen (NIR)	6
117	Jak Jones (WAL)	1
53	Dave Harold (ENG)	6
76	Chen Zhe (CHN)	1
21	Michael Holt (ENG)	6
108	Lee Page (ENG)	1
44	Alan McManus (SCO)	6
85	Joel Walker (ENG)	5

Last 64; Best of 11 frames
5	(England) Judd Trump	6
60	(Thailand) Dechawat Poomjaeng	0
28	(China) Xiao Guodong	6
92	(England) Jamie O'Neill	2
12	(Northern Ireland) Mark Allen	6
53	(England) Dave Harold	3
21	(England) Michael Holt	6
44	(Scotland) Alan McManus	4

Last 32; Best of 11 frames
5	(England) Judd Trump	6
28	(China) Xiao Guodong	2
12	(Northern Ireland) Mark Allen	6
21	(England) Michael Holt	5

Last 16; Best of 11 frames
5	(England) Judd Trump	4
12	(Northern Ireland) Mark Allen	6

==== Section 4 ====
Last 128; Best of 11 frames
45	Rory McLeod (ENG)	6
84	Martin O'Donnell (ENG)	3
20	Mark Williams (WAL)	6
109	Allan Taylor (ENG)	2
52	Peter Lines (ENG)	6
77	Sam Baird (ENG)	2
13	Ricky Walden (ENG)	6
116	Cao Xinlong (CHN)	0
36	Fergal O'Brien (IRL)	6
93	Alex Davies (ENG)	2
29	Mark King (ENG)	6
100	Ross Muir (SCO)	1
61	James Wattana (THA)	6
68	Ian Burns (ENG)	2
4	Ding Junhui (CHN)	6
A	Antony Parsons (ENG)	3

Last 64; Best of 11 frames
45	(England) Rory McLeod	3
20	(Wales) Mark Williams	6
52	(England) Peter Lines	2
13	(England) Ricky Walden	6
36	(Republic of Ireland) Fergal O'Brien	6
29	(England) Mark King	3
61	(Thailand) James Wattana	1
4	(China) Ding Junhui	6

Last 32; Best of 11 frames
20	(Wales) Mark Williams	5
13	(England) Ricky Walden	6
36	(Republic of Ireland) Fergal O'Brien	1
4	(China) Ding Junhui	6

Last 16; Best of 11 frames
13	(England) Ricky Walden	6
4	(China) Ding Junhui	4

=== Bottom half ===
==== Section 5 ====
Last 128; Best of 11 frames
3	Neil Robertson (AUS)	6
A	Dylan Mitchell (ENG)	0
62	Aditya Mehta (IND)	2
67	Robbie Williams (ENG)	6
30	Andrew Higginson (ENG)	6
99	Hammad Miah (ENG)	2
35	David Gilbert (ENG)	4
94	Li Hang (CHN)	6
14	Mark Davis (ENG)	6
115	Robin Hull (FIN)	2
51	Matthew Selt (ENG)	4
78	Scott Donaldson (SCO)	6
19	Joe Perry (ENG)	6
110	James Cahill (ENG)	3
46	Alfie Burden (ENG)	4
83	Daniel Wells (WAL)	6

Last 64; Best of 11 frames
3	(Australia) Neil Robertson	6
67	(England) Robbie Williams	1
30	(England) Andrew Higginson	4
94	(China) Li Hang	6
14	(England) Mark Davis	5
78	(Scotland) Scott Donaldson	6
19	(England) Joe Perry	6
83	(Wales) Daniel Wells	3

Last 32; Best of 11 frames
3	(Australia) Neil Robertson	6
94	(China) Li Hang	3
78	(Scotland) Scott Donaldson	3
19	(England) Joe Perry	6

Last 16; Best of 11 frames
3	(Australia) Neil Robertson	6
19	(England) Joe Perry	1

==== Section 6 ====
Last 128; Best of 11 frames
43	Jamie Burnett (SCO)	6
86	Simon Bedford (ENG)	4
22	Ryan Day (WAL)	5
107	Chris Wakelin (ENG)	6
54	Rod Lawler (ENG)	6
75	Thanawat Thirapongpaiboon (THA)	3
11	John Higgins (SCO)	6
118	Alex Borg (MLT)	2
38	Jack Lisowski (ENG)	4
91	Michael Leslie (SCO)	6
27	Liang Wenbo (CHN)	6
102	Elliot Slessor (ENG)	2
59	Mike Dunn (ENG)	4
70	Luca Brecel (BEL)	6
6	Stephen Maguire (SCO)	6
A	Sanderson Lam (ENG)	2

Last 64; Best of 11 frames
43	(Scotland) Jamie Burnett	6
107	(England) Chris Wakelin	5
54	(England) Rod Lawler	1
11	(Scotland) John Higgins	6
91	(Scotland) Michael Leslie	3
27	(China) Liang Wenbo	6
70	(Belgium) Luca Brecel	5
6	(Scotland) Stephen Maguire	6

Last 32; Best of 11 frames
43	(Scotland) Jamie Burnett	4
11	(Scotland) John Higgins	6
27	(China) Liang Wenbo	5
6	(Scotland) Stephen Maguire	6

Last 16; Best of 11 frames
11	(Scotland) John Higgins	3
6	(Scotland) Stephen Maguire	6

==== Section 7 ====
Last 128; Best of 11 frames
7	Marco Fu (HKG)	5
A	Mitchell Travis (ENG)	6
58	Kurt Maflin (NOR)	6
71	Liam Highfield (ENG)	4
26	Peter Ebdon (ENG)	6
103	Andrew Norman (ENG)	1
39	Jamie Cope (ENG)	4
90	David Morris (IRL)	6
10	Stuart Bingham (ENG)	6
119	Ahmed Saif (QAT)	0
55	Jimmy White (ENG)	6
74	Michael Wasley (ENG)	4
23	Martin Gould (ENG)	3
106	Chris Norbury (ENG)	6
42	Anthony McGill (SCO)	6
87	Kyren Wilson (ENG)	5

Last 64; Best of 11 frames
A	(England) Mitchell Travis	6
58	(Norway) Kurt Maflin	4
26	(England) Peter Ebdon	1
90	(Republic of Ireland) David Morris	6
10	(England) Stuart Bingham	6
55	(England) Jimmy White	2
106	(England) Chris Norbury	0
42	(Scotland) Anthony McGill	6

Last 32; Best of 11 frames
A	(England) Mitchell Travis	1
90	(Republic of Ireland) David Morris	6
10	(England) Stuart Bingham	6
42	(Scotland) Anthony McGill	2

Last 16; Best of 11 frames
90	(Republic of Ireland) David Morris	1
10	(England) Stuart Bingham	6

==== Section 8 ====
Last 128; Best of 11 frames
47	Yu Delu (CHN)	6
82	David Grace (ENG)	3
18	Matthew Stevens (WAL)	6
111	Ryan Clark (ENG)	4
50	Liu Chuang (CHN)	6
79	Tony Drago (MLT)	1
15	Robert Milkins (ENG)	6
114	Patrick Einsle (GER)	3
34	Michael White (WAL)	6
95	Joe Swail (NIR)	0
31	Marcus Campbell (SCO)	6
98	Lyu Haotian (CHN)	5
63	Adam Duffy (ENG)	6
66	Barry Pinches (ENG)	5
2	Ronnie O'Sullivan (ENG)	6
A	Rhys Clark (SCO)	0

Last 64; Best of 11 frames
47	(China) Yu Delu	5
18	(Wales) Matthew Stevens	6
50	(China) Liu Chuang	5
15	(England) Robert Milkins	6
34	(Wales) Michael White	4
31	(Scotland) Marcus Campbell	6
63	(England) Adam Duffy	3
2	(England) Ronnie O'Sullivan	6

Last 32; Best of 11 frames
18	(Wales) Matthew Stevens	2
15	(England) Robert Milkins	6
31	(Scotland) Marcus Campbell	2
2	(England) Ronnie O'Sullivan	6

Last 16; Best of 11 frames
15	(England) Robert Milkins	0
2	(England) Ronnie O'Sullivan	6

=== Finals ===
Quarter-finals; Best of 11 frames
1	(England) Mark Selby	6
9	(England) Barry Hawkins	5
12	(Northern Ireland) Mark Allen	2
13	(England) Ricky Walden	6
3	(Australia) Neil Robertson	6
6	(Scotland) Stephen Maguire	2
10	(England) Stuart Bingham	6
2	(England) Ronnie O'Sullivan	4

Semi-finals; Best of 17 frames
1	(England) Mark Selby	9
13	(England) Ricky Walden	5
3	(Australia) Neil Robertson	9
10	(England) Stuart Bingham	8

Final; Best of 19 frames
1	(England) Mark Selby	7
3	(Australia) Neil Robertson	10

== Final ==
Final: Best of 19 frames. Referee: Brendan Moore. Barbican Centre, York, England, 8 December 2013.
Mark Selby (1); England	7–10	Neil Robertson (3); Australia
Afternoon: 130–1 (130), 0–76 (63), 75–10, 89–0, 68–22 (57), 68–39, 21–65 (54), 0–123 (123); Evening: 70–22, 0–101 (56), 0–122 (122), 0–132 (132), 26–71, 28–61, 116–0 (74), 47–59, 36–82 (57)
130	Highest break	132
1	Century breaks	3
3	50+ breaks	7

== Century breaks ==
- 147, 130, 129, 116, 109 – Mark Selby
- 142, 112, 102 – Stephen Maguire
- 142, 110, 106 – Barry Hawkins
- 141, 132, 128, 123, 122, 119, 111, 107 – Neil Robertson
- 139 – Michael Leslie
- 137 – Gary Wilson
- 137 – Ricky Walden
- 136, 101 – Dominic Dale
- 135, 128, 119 – Ding Junhui
- 135, 127, 108, 100 – Ronnie O'Sullivan
- 135, 108 – Alfie Burden
- 133, 104, 103, 102 – Judd Trump
- 133 – Thanawat Tirapongpaiboon
- 131, 131, 124, 107, 101 – Stuart Bingham
- 131 – Mark King
- 130, 128, 101 – John Higgins
- 129 – Nigel Bond
- 125, 106, 106 – Xiao Guodong
- 122 – Liam Highfield
- 120, 107 – Liang Wenbo
- 119 – Kyren Wilson
- 117 – Alan McManus
- 117 – Scott Donaldson
- 116, 103 – Anthony McGill
- 116 – Daniel Wells
- 113, 112 – Mark Allen
- 113 – Anthony Hamilton
- 112, 105 – Jamie Burnett
- 110 – Jamie O'Neill
- 110 – Joe Perry
- 108 – Noppon Saengkham
- 107, 104, 102 – Graeme Dott
- 107 – Mike Dunn
- 107 – Jimmy White
- 105, 100 – Robert Milkins
- 105 – Michael White
- 105 – Shaun Murphy
- 103, 100 – Michael Holt
- 102 – Yu Delu
- 102 – Ali Carter
- 102 – Fergal O'Brien
- 101 – David Grace
- 101 – Matthew Stevens
- 101 – Liu Chuang
