= 2014 UK Championship =

Snooker tournament

2014 Coral UK Championship
Tournament information
- Dates: 25 November – 7 December 2014
- Venue: Barbican Centre
- City: York
- Country: England
- Organisation: World Snooker
- Format: Ranking event
- Total prize fund: £740,000
- Winner's share: £150,000
- Highest break: Ronnie O'Sullivan (ENG) (147)

Final
- Champion: Ronnie O'Sullivan (ENG)
- Runner-up: Judd Trump (ENG)
- Score: 10–9

The 2014 UK Championship (officially the 2014 Coral UK Championship) was a professional ranking snooker tournament that took place between 25 November and 7 December 2014 at the Barbican Centre in York, England. It was the fifth ranking event of the 2014/2015 season.

Neil Robertson was the defending champion, but he lost 5–6 against Graeme Dott in the last 16. This result led to Ding Junhui becoming the first Asian player to reach the world number one ranking.

Ronnie O'Sullivan won his fifth UK Championship and his 27th ranking title by defeating Judd Trump 10–9 in the final. Trump had trailed 4–9 at one point during the evening session but fought back with 5 consecutive frames to level at 9–9 before O’Sullivan won the deciding frame.

Ronnie O'Sullivan made the 109th official maximum break during his last 16 match against Matthew Selt. This was O'Sullivan's 13th official 147 break and also the fourth maximum break in the 2014/2015 season and the third time in a row that a maximum was made in a UK Championship.

Judd Trump made his 300th career century during his last-64 match against Fraser Patrick.

Starting this year, the Semi-finals were reduced from the best of 17 frames to the best of 11 frames. This meant that all rounds up to the Semi-finals were played using the best of 11 frames format. The final was still played over the best of 19 frames. This is the format that is still being used to the current day.

== Prize fund ==
The breakdown of prize money for this year is shown below:

- Winner: £150,000
- Runner-up: £70,000
- Semi-final: £30,000
- Quarter-final: £20,000
- Last 16: £12,000
- Last 32: £9,000
- Last 64: £3,000
- Highest break: £4,000
- Maximum break: £40,000
- Total: £740,000

== Main draw ==
=== Top half ===
==== Section 1 ====
Last 128; Best of 11 frames
1 | Neil Robertson (AUS) | 6
A | Joe O'Connor (ENG) | 0
64 | Kyren Wilson (ENG) | 6
65 | Gary Wilson (ENG) | 5
32 | Kurt Maflin (NOR) | 6
97 | Chris Norbury (ENG) | 1
33 | Peter Ebdon (ENG) | 6
96 | Ross Muir (SCO) | 5
16 | Robert Milkins (ENG) | 6
113 | Michael Leslie (SCO) | 0
49 | Marcus Campbell (SCO) | 6
80 | Scott Donaldson (SCO) | 4
17 | Graeme Dott (SCO) | 6
112 | Alexander Ursenbacher (SUI) | 2
48 | Anthony Hamilton (ENG) | 6
81 | Craig Steadman (ENG) | 5

Last 64; Best of 11 frames
1 | (Australia) Neil Robertson | 6
64 | (England) Kyren Wilson | 5
32 | (Norway) Kurt Maflin | 1
33 | (England) Peter Ebdon | 6
16 | (England) Robert Milkins | 6
49 | (Scotland) Marcus Campbell | 0
17 | (Scotland) Graeme Dott | 6
48 | (England) Anthony Hamilton | 4

Last 32; Best of 11 frames
1 | (Australia) Neil Robertson | 6
33 | (England) Peter Ebdon | 2
16 | (England) Robert Milkins | 0
17 | (Scotland) Graeme Dott | 6

Last 16; Best of 11 frames
1 | (Australia) Neil Robertson | 5
17 | (Scotland) Graeme Dott | 6

==== Section 2 ====
Last 128; Best of 11 frames
41 | Tom Ford (ENG) | 6
88 | Barry Pinches (ENG) | 4
24 | Alan McManus (SCO) | 1
105 | Joel Walker (ENG) | 6
56 | Alfie Burden (ENG) | 6
73 | Chris Wakelin (ENG) | 4
9 | Stuart Bingham (ENG) | 6
120 | Thanawat Thirapongpaiboon (THA) | 0
40 | Ken Doherty (IRL) | 6
89 | Mitchell Mann (ENG) | 2
25 | Michael White (WAL) | 6
104 | Cao Xinlong (CHN) | 2
57 | Robbie Williams (ENG) | 6
72 | Sam Baird (ENG) | 4
8 | Ricky Walden (ENG) | 6
121 | Steve Davis (ENG) | 2

Last 64; Best of 11 frames
41 | (England) Tom Ford | 3
105 | (England) Joel Walker | 6
56 | (England) Alfie Burden | 3
9 | (England) Stuart Bingham | 6
40 | (Republic of Ireland) Ken Doherty | 6
25 | (Wales) Michael White | 4
57 | (England) Robbie Williams | 5
8 | (England) Ricky Walden | 6

Last 32; Best of 11 frames
105 | (England) Joel Walker | 5
9 | (England) Stuart Bingham | 6
40 | (Republic of Ireland) Ken Doherty | 1
8 | (England) Ricky Walden | 6

Last 16; Best of 11 frames
9 | (England) Stuart Bingham | 6
8 | (England) Ricky Walden | 0

==== Section 3 ====
Last 128; Best of 11 frames
5 | Barry Hawkins (ENG) | 6
A | Ashley Carty (ENG) | 1
60 | Nigel Bond (ENG) | 6
69 | Stuart Carrington (ENG) | 3
28 | Fergal O'Brien (IRL) | 4
101 | Igor Figueiredo (BRA) | 6
37 | Anthony McGill (SCO) | 6
92 | Michael Georgiou (ENG) | 4
12 | John Higgins (SCO) | 6
117 | Lee Walker (WAL) | 2
53 | Jamie Cope (ENG) | 6
76 | John Astley (ENG) | 2
21 | Matthew Stevens (WAL) | 6
108 | Allan Taylor (ENG) | 2
44 | Gerard Greene (NIR) | 6
85 | Vinnie Calabrese (AUS) | 2

Last 64; Best of 11 frames
5 | (England) Barry Hawkins | 5
60 | (England) Nigel Bond | 6
101 | (Brazil) Igor Figueiredo | 4
37 | (Scotland) Anthony McGill | 6
12 | (Scotland) John Higgins | 6
53 | (England) Jamie Cope | 4
21 | (Wales) Matthew Stevens | 6
44 | (Northern Ireland) Gerard Greene | 3

Last 32; Best of 11 frames
60 | (England) Nigel Bond | 5
37 | (Scotland) Anthony McGill | 6
12 | (Scotland) John Higgins | 6
21 | (Wales) Matthew Stevens | 2

Last 16; Best of 11 frames
37 | (Scotland) Anthony McGill | 6
12 | (Scotland) John Higgins | 5

==== Section 4 ====
Last 128; Best of 11 frames
45 | Matthew Selt (ENG) | 6
84 | Hammad Miah (ENG) | 0
20 | Xiao Guodong (CHN) | 6
109 | Ian Glover (ENG) | 1
52 | Rory McLeod (ENG) | 6
77 | Ian Burns (ENG) | 2
13 | Ali Carter (ENG) | 5
116 | Zhang Anda (CHN) | 6
36 | Ben Woollaston (ENG) | 6
93 | Michael Wasley (ENG) | 4
29 | Dominic Dale (WAL) | 4
100 | Tony Drago (MLT) | 6
61 | Peter Lines (ENG) | 6
68 | Joe Swail (NIR) | 4
4 | Ronnie O'Sullivan (ENG) | 6
A | Daniel Wells (WAL) | 2

Last 64; Best of 11 frames
45 | (England) Matthew Selt | 6
20 | (China) Xiao Guodong | 4
52 | (England) Rory McLeod | 6
116 | (China) Zhang Anda | 5
36 | (England) Ben Woollaston | 6
100 | (Malta) Tony Drago | 3
61 | (England) Peter Lines | 3
4 | (England) Ronnie O'Sullivan | 6

Last 32; Best of 11 frames
45 | (England) Matthew Selt | 6
52 | (England) Rory McLeod | 4
36 | (England) Ben Woollaston | 2
4 | (England) Ronnie O'Sullivan | 6

Last 16; Best of 11 frames
45 | (England) Matthew Selt | 0
4 | (England) Ronnie O'Sullivan | 6

=== Bottom half ===
==== Section 5 ====
Last 128; Best of 11 frames
3 | Ding Junhui (CHN) | 6
A | John Sutton (IRL) | 0
62 | Jimmy White (ENG) | 6
67 | Dave Harold (ENG) | 2
30 | Mark King (ENG) | 0
99 | James Cahill (ENG) | 6
35 | Andrew Higginson (ENG) | 6
94 | Tian Pengfei (CHN) | 3
14 | Joe Perry (ENG) | w/o
115 | Liu Chuang (CHN) | w/d
51 | Mike Dunn (ENG) | 6
78 | Andrew Pagett (WAL) | 2
19 | Mark Davis (ENG) | 6
110 | Jak Jones (WAL) | 2
46 | Jamie Jones (WAL) | 3
83 | Liam Highfield (ENG) | 6

Last 64; Best of 11 frames
3 | (China) Ding Junhui | 6
62 | (England) Jimmy White | 2
99 | (England) James Cahill | 6
35 | (England) Andrew Higginson | 4
14 | (England) Joe Perry | 6
51 | (England) Mike Dunn | 1
19 | (England) Mark Davis | 6
83 | (England) Liam Highfield | 4

Last 32; Best of 11 frames
3 | (China) Ding Junhui | 5
99 | (England) James Cahill | 6
14 | (England) Joe Perry | 5
19 | (England) Mark Davis | 6

Last 16; Best of 11 frames
99 | (England) James Cahill | 2
19 | (England) Mark Davis | 6

==== Section 6 ====
Last 128; Best of 11 frames
43 | Jamie Burnett (SCO) | 4
86 | Fraser Patrick (SCO) | 6
22 | Ryan Day (WAL) | 6
107 | Lu Chenwei (CHN) | 1
54 | Aditya Mehta (IND) | 6
75 | Alex Davies (ENG) | 4
11 | Judd Trump (ENG) | w/o
118 | Rouzi Maimaiti (CHN) | w/d
38 | Rod Lawler (ENG) | 6
91 | Alex Borg (MLT) | 5
27 | Martin Gould (ENG) | 6
102 | Lee Page (ENG) | 4
59 | Luca Brecel (BEL) | 6
70 | Noppon Saengkham (THA) | 1
6 | Mark Allen (NIR) | 6
A | Eden Sharav (SCO) | 2

Last 64; Best of 11 frames
86 | (Scotland) Fraser Patrick | 6
22 | (Wales) Ryan Day | 4
54 | (India) Aditya Mehta | 1
11 | (England) Judd Trump | 6
38 | (England) Rod Lawler | 6
27 | (England) Martin Gould | 5
59 | (Belgium) Luca Brecel | 0
6 | (Northern Ireland) Mark Allen | 6

Last 32; Best of 11 frames
86 | (Scotland) Fraser Patrick | 3
11 | (England) Judd Trump | 6
38 | (England) Rod Lawler | 6
6 | (Northern Ireland) Mark Allen | 4

Last 16; Best of 11 frames
11 | (England) Judd Trump | 6
38 | (England) Rod Lawler | 3

==== Section 7 ====
Last 128; Best of 11 frames
7 | Shaun Murphy (ENG) | 6
122 | James Wattana (THA) | 3
58 | Thepchaiya Un-Nooh (THA) | 5
71 | Robin Hull (FIN) | 6
26 | Liang Wenbo (CHN) | 6
103 | David Grace (ENG) | 3
39 | Jack Lisowski (ENG) | 6
90 | Chris Melling (ENG) | 1
10 | Marco Fu (HKG) | 6
119 | Ahmed Saif (QAT) | 4
55 | Cao Yupeng (CHN) | 4
74 | Lyu Haotian (CHN) | 6
23 | Michael Holt (ENG) | 6
106 | Zak Surety (ENG) | 1
42 | Dechawat Poomjaeng (THA) | 6
87 | Andrew Norman (ENG) | 2

Last 64; Best of 11 frames
7 | (England) Shaun Murphy | 6
71 | (Finland) Robin Hull | 3
26 | (China) Liang Wenbo | 4
39 | (England) Jack Lisowski | 6
10 | (Hong Kong) Marco Fu | 6
74 | (China) Lyu Haotian | 1
23 | (England) Michael Holt | 3
42 | (Thailand) Dechawat Poomjaeng | 6

Last 32; Best of 11 frames
7 | (England) Shaun Murphy | 6
39 | (England) Jack Lisowski | 4
10 | (Hong Kong) Marco Fu | 6
42 | (Thailand) Dechawat Poomjaeng | 3

Last 16; Best of 11 frames
7 | (England) Shaun Murphy | 5
10 | (Hong Kong) Marco Fu | 6

==== Section 8 ====
Last 128; Best of 11 frames
47 | Jimmy Robertson (ENG) | 6
82 | Zhou Yuelong (CHN) | 1
18 | Mark Williams (WAL) | 6
111 | Steven Hallworth (ENG) | 1
50 | Yu Delu (CHN) | 6
79 | Oliver Lines (ENG) | 2
15 | Stephen Maguire (SCO) | 6
114 | Lu Ning (CHN) | 2
34 | David Gilbert (ENG) | 6
95 | Elliot Slessor (ENG) | 4
31 | Mark Joyce (ENG) | 6
98 | Ratchayothin Yotharuck (THA) | 2
63 | David Morris (IRL) | 6
66 | Li Hang (CHN) | 4
2 | Mark Selby (ENG) | 6
A | Oliver Brown (ENG) | 0

Last 64; Best of 11 frames
47 | (England) Jimmy Robertson | 0
18 | (Wales) Mark Williams | 6
50 | (China) Yu Delu | 4
15 | (Scotland) Stephen Maguire | 6
34 | (England) David Gilbert | 6
31 | (England) Mark Joyce | 2
63 | (Republic of Ireland) David Morris | 6
2 | (England) Mark Selby | 4

Last 32; Best of 11 frames
18 | (Wales) Mark Williams | 2
15 | (Scotland) Stephen Maguire | 6
34 | (England) David Gilbert | 2
63 | (Republic of Ireland) David Morris | 6

Last 16; Best of 11 frames
15 | (Scotland) Stephen Maguire | 6
63 | (Republic of Ireland) David Morris | 3

=== Finals ===
Quarter-finals; Best of 11 frames
17 | (Scotland) Graeme Dott | 5
9 | (England) Stuart Bingham | 6
37 | (Scotland) Anthony McGill | 4
4 | (England) Ronnie O'Sullivan | 6
19 | (England) Mark Davis | 1
11 | (England) Judd Trump | 6
10 | (Hong Kong) Marco Fu | 4
15 | (Scotland) Stephen Maguire | 6

Semi-finals; Best of 11 frames
9 | (England) Stuart Bingham | 5
4 | (England) Ronnie O'Sullivan | 6
11 | (England) Judd Trump | 6
15 | (Scotland) Stephen Maguire | 4

Final; Best of 19 frames
4 | (England) Ronnie O'Sullivan | 10
11 | (England) Judd Trump | 9

== Final ==
Final: Best of 19 frames. Referee: Terry Camilleri. Alexandra Palace, England, 7 December 2014.
| Ronnie O'Sullivan (4); England | 10–9 | Judd Trump (11); England |
Afternoon: 54–44, 32–87 (50), 103–0 (82), 87–13, 118–1 (81), 77–49, 36–75, 49–69; Evening: 67–53 (O'Sullivan 53), 67–56 (Trump 56), 0–62, 133–0 (133), 89–35 (54), 32–66, 0–120 (120), 0–127 (127), 8–86 (86), 59–67 (67), 75–14 (51)
| 133 | Highest break | 127 |
| 1 | Century breaks | 2 |
| 6 | 50+ breaks | 6 |

== Century breaks ==
- 147, 133, 125, 117, 106, 104 – Ronnie O'Sullivan
- 142, 137, 108, 103, 102 – Stuart Bingham
- 139 – Gerard Greene
- 139 – Fraser Patrick
- 138, 125, 115, 103 – Mark Allen
- 138 – Michael Holt
- 137, 117 – Thepchaiya Un-Nooh
- 137 – Igor Figueiredo
- 137 – Shaun Murphy
- 134, 105 – Ding Junhui
- 132, 126, 113, 108, 104 – Stephen Maguire
- 132, 116 – Nigel Bond
- 132 – Matthew Stevens
- 131 – Xiao Guodong
- 130, 129, 127, 120, 112, 110, 104, 102, 100 – Judd Trump
- 129, 128, 101, 100 – Ricky Walden
- 129, 128 – John Higgins
- 127, 120, 117 – Graeme Dott
- 127 – Mark Joyce
- 127 – Peter Ebdon
- 126 – David Morris
- 124 – Mark Selby
- 122 – Matthew Selt
- 115, 105 – Ryan Day
- 115, 103 – Jamie Cope
- 114 – Liang Wenbo
- 113 – Michael Wasley
- 112, 106, 101 – Marco Fu
- 110, 109, 109, 102 – Ken Doherty
- 110 – Jimmy White
- 110 – Rod Lawler
- 109 – Mike Dunn
- 109 – Tony Drago
- 108, 106, 100 – Neil Robertson
- 107 – Ben Woollaston
- 107 – Ratchayothin Yotharuck
- 104 – Robin Hull
- 103 – Luca Brecel
- 103 – Rory McLeod
- 103 – Anthony McGill
- 102, 101 – Joe Swail
- 101 – Barry Pinches
- 101 – Mark Williams
- 100 – Fergal O'Brien
- 100 – Zhang Anda
- 100 – James Wattana
- 100 – Yu Delu
- 100 – David Gilbert
- 100 – James Cahill
