= Lee Page =

English snooker player

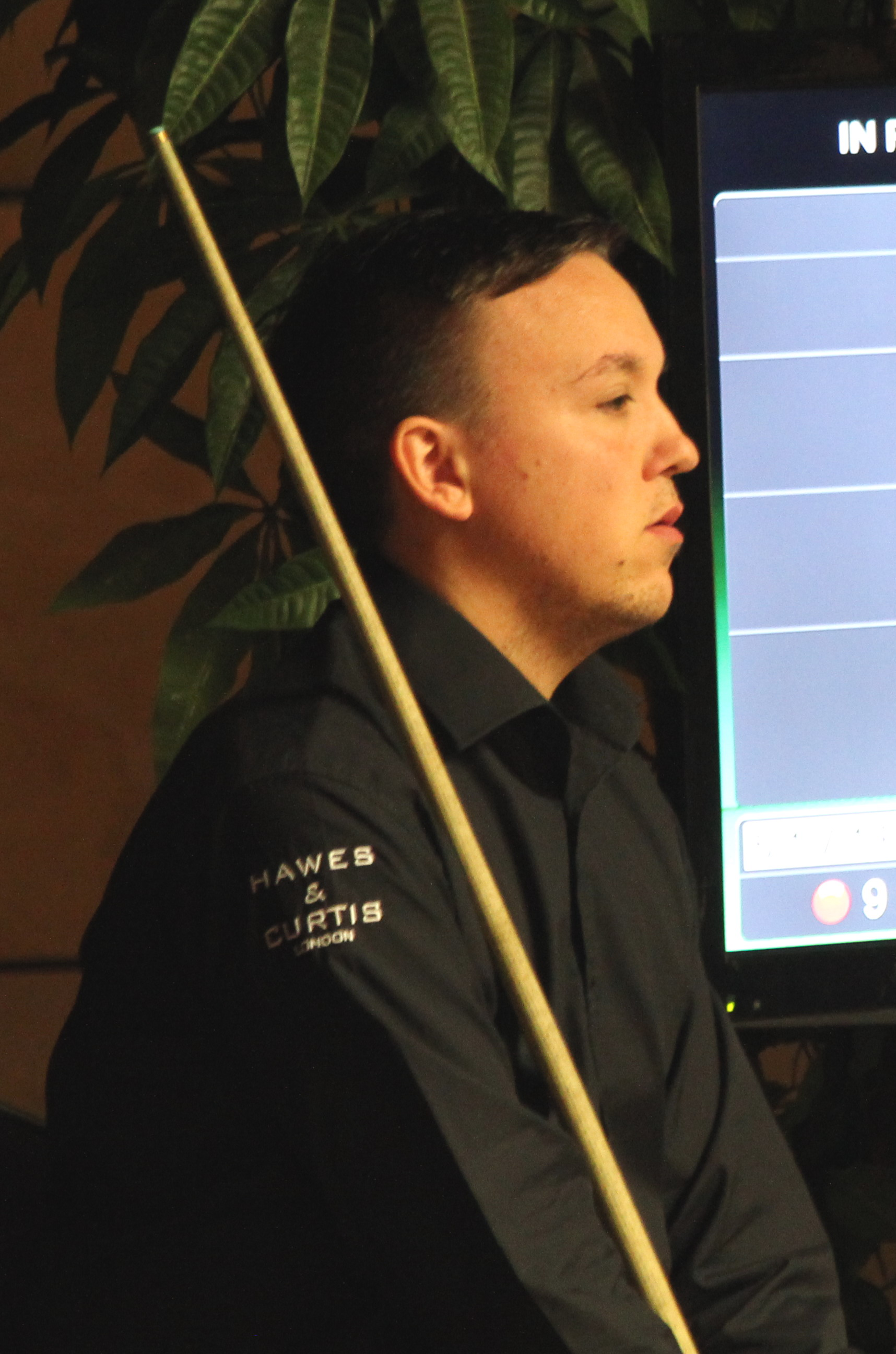
- Page at the 2014 Paul Hunter Classic

Personal information
- Born: 6 November 1987 (age 38) Redditch, England

Sport
- Country: England
- Sport: Snooker
- Professional: 2006/2007, 2009/2010, 2013–2015
- Highest ranking: 91 (June–July 2014)

Lee Page (born 6 November 1987) is an English former professional snooker player from Kidderminster. He began his professional career by playing Challenge Tour in 2004, at the time the second-level professional tour.

== Career ==
Page first entered Main Tour for the 2006–07 season, but was unable to retain his place for the following season's tour. He qualified for the 2009–10 season, however he was relegated from the circuit at the end of the season. He returned to the tour after winning a two-year card at the 2013 Q School for the 2013–14 and 2014–15 seasons.

== Performance and rankings timeline ==
Tournament	2004/ 05	2006/ 07	2009/ 10	2010/ 11	2011/ 12	2012/ 13	2013/ 14	2014/ 15
Ranking (Note: From the 2010/2011 season it shows the ranking at the beginning of the season.)	(Note: New players don't have a ranking.)			(Note: He was an amateur.)				122
Ranking tournaments
Wuxi Classic (Note: The event was called the Jiangsu Classic (2008/2009–2009/2010))	Not Held		Non-Ranking			A	LQ	1R
Australian Goldfields Open	Not Held				A	A	LQ	LQ
Shanghai Masters	Not Held		LQ	A	A	A	LQ	LQ
International Championship	Not Held					A	LQ	LQ
UK Championship	A	LQ	LQ	A	A	A	1R	1R
German Masters	Not Held			A	A	A	LQ	A
Welsh Open	A	LQ	LQ	A	A	A	1R	1R
Indian Open	Not Held						LQ	LQ
Players Championship Grand Final (Note: The event was called the Players Tour Championship Grand Finals (2010/2011–2012/2013))	Not Held			DNQ	DNQ	DNQ	DNQ	DNQ
China Open	A	LQ	LQ	A	A	A	LQ	LQ
World Championship	LQ	LQ	LQ	A	A	A	LQ	LQ
Non-ranking tournaments
The Masters	A	LQ	LQ	A	A	A	A	A
Former ranking tournaments
Malta Cup	A	LQ	Not Held					
Northern Ireland Trophy	NH	LQ	Not Held					
World Open (Note: The event was called the Grand Prix (2004/2005–2009/2010))	A	LQ	LQ	A	A	A	LQ	NH

Performance Table Legend
LQ	lost in the qualifying draw	#R	lost in the early rounds of the tournament (WR = Wildcard round, RR = Round robin)	QF	lost in the quarter-finals
SF	lost in the semi-finals	F	lost in the final	W	won the tournament
DNQ	did not qualify for the tournament	A	did not participate in the tournament	WD	withdrew from the tournament

NH / Not Held	means an event was not held.
NR / Non-Ranking Event	means an event is/was no longer a ranking event.
R / Ranking Event	means an event is/was a ranking event.
MR / Minor-Ranking Event	means an event is/was a minor-ranking event.

== Career finals ==
=== Pro-am finals: 1 ===
Outcome	Year	Championship	Opponent in the final	Score
Runner-up	2007	Pontins Autumn Open	(England) Jamie Cope	0–5

=== Amateur finals: 3 (1 title) ===
Outcome	Year	Championship	Opponent in the final	Score
Winner	2000	English Under-13 Championship	(England) Judd Trump	4–1
Runner-up	2009	PIOS – Event 7	(Thailand) Thepchaiya Un-Nooh	3–6
Runner-up	2012	EBSA Qualifying Tour – Germany	(Germany) Patrick Einsle	2–3
