= Chris Norbury =

English snooker player

Personal information
- Born: 14 August 1986 (age 40) Accrington, England

Sport
- Country: England
- Sport: Snooker
- Professional: 2005–2007, 2009/10, 2013–2015
- Highest ranking: 72 (2006/07)
- Best ranking finish: Last 32 (x1)

Christopher Norbury (born 14 August 1986) is an English former professional snooker player. He began his professional career by playing Challenge Tour in 2003, at the time the second-level professional tour. Norbury first entered Main Tour for the 2005–06 season, after finishing the 2004/05 Challenge Tour Rankings on the rank 5. He played in the latter stages of the Paul Hunter Classic in both 2008 and 2009, losing in the first round to Shaun Murphy 4–1 in 2008, and losing to Dave Harold 4–2 in 2009.

He runs Elite Snooker Club in Lostock Hall, Lancashire along with fellow professional player, Shokat Ali.

== Personal life ==
Chris supports his local football, team Accrington Stanley. Chris is married.

== Performance and rankings timeline ==
Tournament	2002/ 03	2003/ 04	2004/ 05	2005/ 06	2006/ 07	2009/ 10	2010/ 11	2011/ 12	2012/ 13	2013/ 14	2014/ 15
Ranking (Note: From the 2010/2011 season it shows the ranking at the beginning of the season.)	(Note: He was an amateur.)	(Note: New players don't have a ranking.)		159	72						108
Ranking tournaments
Wuxi Classic (Note: The event was called the Jiangsu Classic (2009/2010))	Not Held					Non-Ranking			A	LQ	LQ
Australian Goldfields Open	Not Held							A	A	LQ	LQ
Shanghai Masters	Not Held					LQ	A	A	A	LQ	LQ
International Championship	Not Held								A	LQ	LQ
UK Championship	A	A	A	LQ	LQ	LQ	A	A	A	2R	1R
German Masters	Not Held						A	WR	A	LQ	LQ
Welsh Open	A	A	A	LQ	LQ	LQ	A	A	A	1R	1R
Indian Open	Not Held									LQ	LQ
Players Championship Grand Final (Note: The event was called the Players Tour Championship Grand Finals (2010/2011–2012/2013))	Not Held						DNQ	DNQ	DNQ	DNQ	DNQ
China Open	Not Held		A	LQ	LQ	LQ	A	A	A	LQ	LQ
World Championship	LQ	LQ	LQ	LQ	LQ	LQ	A	A	A	LQ	LQ
Non-ranking tournaments
The Masters	A	A	A	LQ	LQ	LQ	A	A	A	A	A
Former Ranking tournaments
Malta Cup (Note: The event was called the European Open (2002/2003–2003/2004))	A	A	A	LQ	LQ	Not Held					
Northern Ireland Trophy	Not Held			NR	LQ	Not Held					
World Open (Note: The event was called the LG Cup (2002/2003–2003/2004) and the Grand Prix (2004/2005–2009/2010))	A	A	A	2R	LQ	LQ	LQ	A	A	LQ	NH

Performance Table Legend
LQ	lost in the qualifying draw	#R	lost in the early rounds of the tournament (WR = Wildcard round, RR = Round robin)	QF	lost in the quarter-finals
SF	lost in the semi–finals	F	lost in the final	W	won the tournament
DNQ	did not qualify for the tournament	A	did not participate in the tournament	WD	withdrew from the tournament

NH / Not Held	means an event was not held.
NR / Non-Ranking Event	means an event is/was no longer a ranking event.
R / Ranking Event	means an event is/was a ranking event.
MR / Minor-Ranking Event	means an event is/was a minor-ranking event.
