= Ryan Clark (snooker player) =

English snooker player

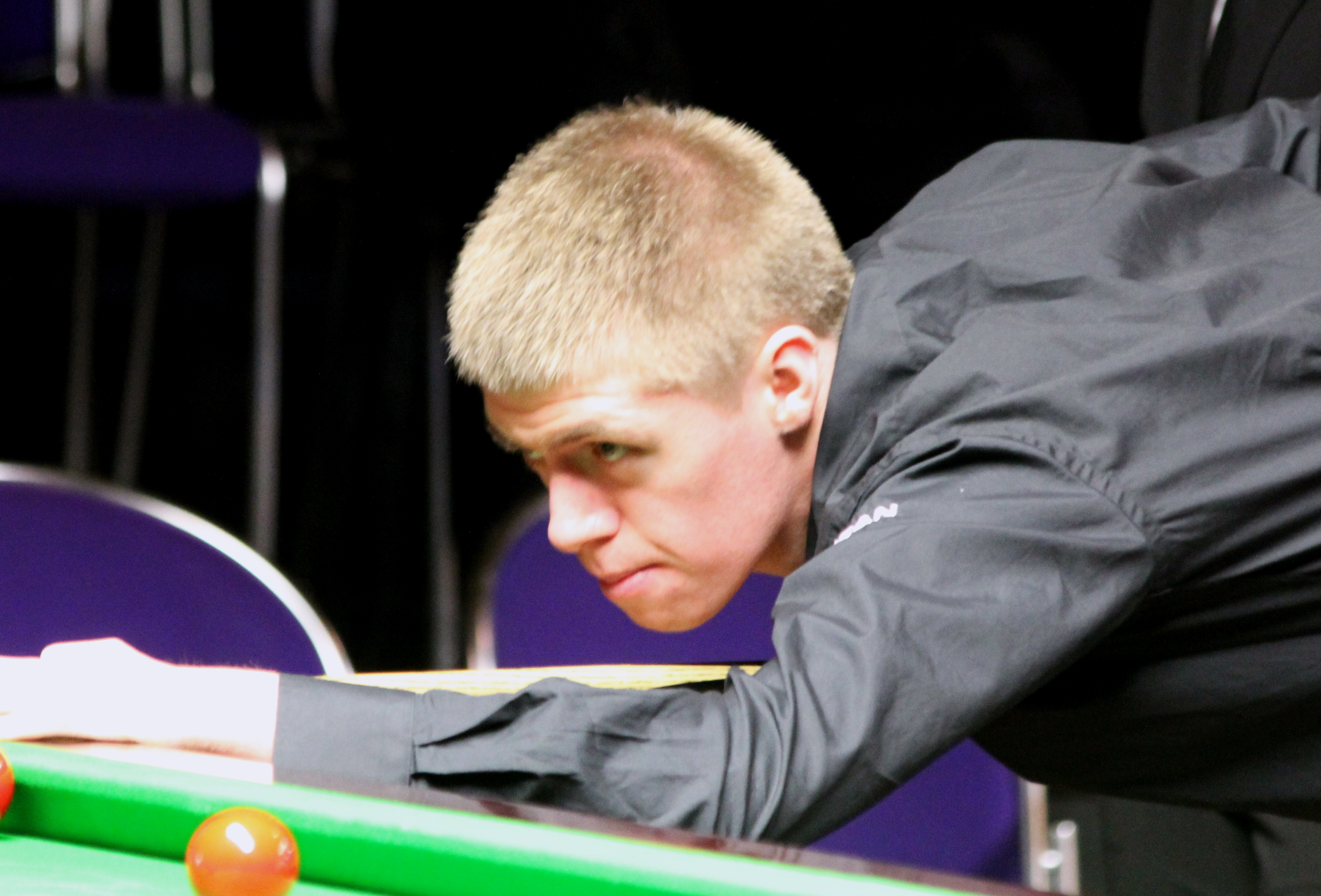
- Paul Hunter Classic 2014

Personal information
- Born: 22 September 1992 (age 34) Hartlepool, England

Sport
- Country: England
- Sport: Snooker
- Professional: 2013–2015
- Highest ranking: 104 (June–July 2014)

Ryan Clark (born 22 September 1992) is an English former professional snooker player.

In May 2013, Clark qualified for the 2013–14 and 2014–15 professional Main Tour as one of four semi-finalists from the second 2013 Q School event.

== Career ==
=== Debut season ===
Clark only won two matches during the 2013–14 season, and ended his first season on tour ranked world number 124.

=== 2014/2015 season ===
Clark lost all six of his matches in the 2014–15 season, failing to win a frame in his last four. Having not played in an event since October 2014 when he lost 0–4 to Mark Joyce in the Bulgarian Open, Clark fell off the tour at the season's conclusion in 2015.

== Performance and rankings timeline ==
Tournament	2010/ 11	2013/ 14	2014/ 15
Ranking (Note: It shows the ranking at the beginning of the season.)	(Note: He was an amateur.)	(Note: New players on the Main Tour don't have a ranking.)	124
Ranking tournaments
Wuxi Classic	NR	LQ	LQ
Australian Goldfields Open	NH	LQ	LQ
Shanghai Masters	A	LQ	LQ
International Championship	NH	LQ	A
UK Championship	A	1R	A
German Masters	A	LQ	A
Welsh Open	A	1R	A
Indian Open	NH	LQ	A
Players Championship Grand Final (Note: The event was called the Players Tour Championship Grand Finals (2010/2011))	DNQ	DNQ	DNQ
China Open	A	LQ	A
World Championship	A	LQ	A
Former ranking tournaments
World Open	A	LQ	NH

Performance Table Legend
LQ	lost in the qualifying draw	#R	lost in the early rounds of the tournament (WR = Wildcard round, RR = Round robin)	QF	lost in the quarter-finals
SF	lost in the semi-finals	F	lost in the final	W	won the tournament
DNQ	did not qualify for the tournament	A	did not participate in the tournament	WD	withdrew from the tournament

NH / Not Held	means an event was not held.
NR / Non-Ranking Event	means an event is/was no longer a ranking event.
R / Ranking Event	means an event is/was a ranking event.
MR / Minor-Ranking Event	means an event is/was a minor-ranking event.
