= Michael Wasley =

English snooker player

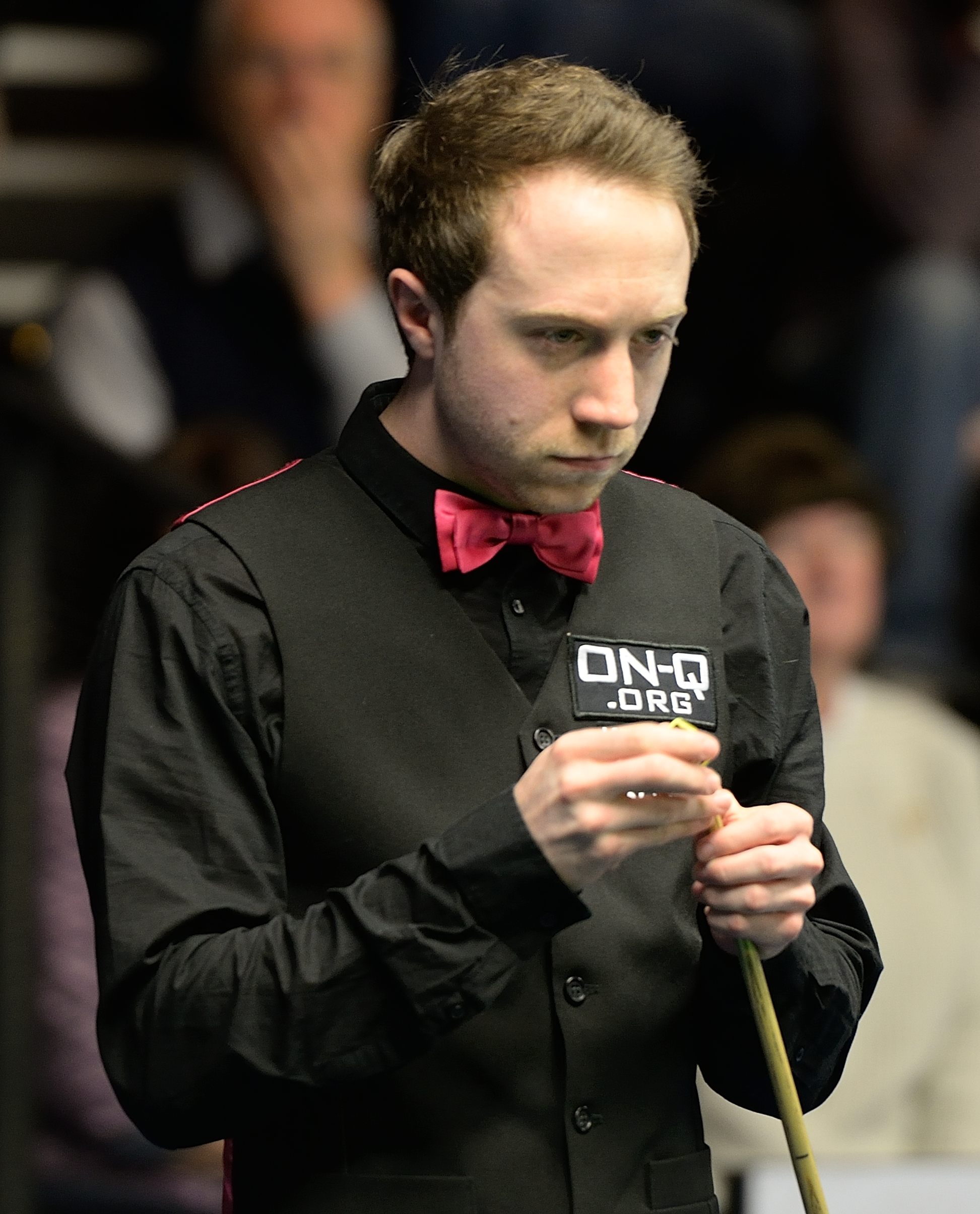
- Michael Wasley at the 2015 German Masters

Personal information
- Born: 23 February 1990 (age 36) Gloucester, England

Sport
- Country: England
- Sport: Snooker
- Professional: 2012–2016
- Highest ranking: 72 (May–June 2014)
- Best ranking finish: Last 16 (2014 World Championship)

Michael Wasley (born 23 February 1990) is an English former professional snooker player.

Wasley turned professional after qualifying via Event 3 of 2012 Q School and gained a two-year tour card for the 2012–13 and 2013–14 snooker seasons. He won five matches in the event, concluding with a 4–3 victory over Fraser Patrick. His biggest achievement to date is reaching the last 16 of the 2014 World Championship.

== Career ==
=== Debut season ===
Wasley's first match as a professional was a 5–4 win against Liam Highfield in qualifying for the 2012 Wuxi Classic. He lost 1–5 to Passakorn Suwannawat in the following round. In November, Wasley qualified for the main draw of a ranking event for the first time. He beat Jack Lisowski 5–1 and former world champion Peter Ebdon 5–3 to reach the last 32 of the German Masters, where Neil Robertson comfortably beat him 5–1. Wasley also qualified for the Welsh Open thanks to wins over Anthony McGill and top 16 player Mark Davis. He led 2–1 in the last 32 against Andrew Higginson, but lost three frames to bow out of the event 2–4. Wasley saw off Sean O'Sullivan in the first round of World Championship Qualifying, but his season was ended in the next round as James Wattana beat him 10–7. Wasley finished his first year on tour ranked world number 80.

=== 2013/2014 season ===
Wasley reached the Wuxi Classic, the first ranking event of the 2013–14 season, thanks to Ronnie O'Sullivan's withdrawal for medical reasons and lost 5–1 against Gerard Greene in the first round. He played at the main venue in four more ranking events but lost in the first round in all of them. His best run in European Tour events was at the Kay Suzanne Memorial Cup where he saw off James Wattana, Zhang Anda and Peter Ebdon, before being beaten 4–3 by Jamie Jones. Two other last 32 exits helped Wasley finish 47th on the Order of Merit.

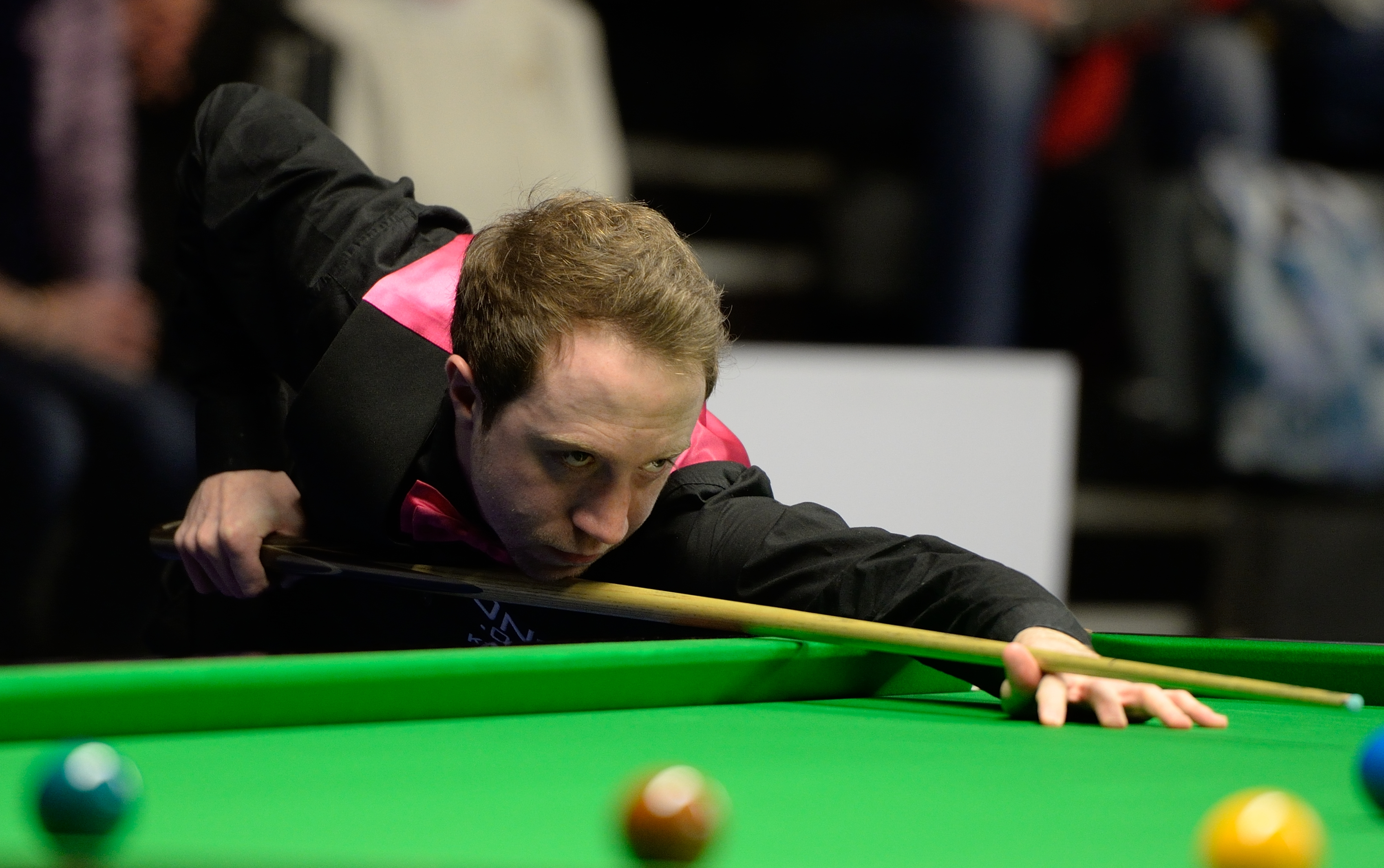
Michael Wasley at the 2015 German Masters

In qualifying for the World Championship, Wasley squeezed past Sydney Wilson 10–9 and then beat Rory McLeod and Mark Joyce both 10–6 to stand just one victory away from playing in the sport's biggest event for the first time. He played world number 16 Robert Milkins in a dramatic match that went to a respotted black in the deciding frame which Wasley potted to reach the Crucible. In the first round, Wasley caused one of the biggest upsets in the tournament's history by eliminating world number two Ding Junhui 10–9 after having trailed 6–3 at the end of the opening session. In the second round he fell 7–1 down to Dominic Dale and could never recover as he was beaten 13–4. Despite this run, Wasley could not quite reach the top 64 in the rankings as he was placed number 72, which would have seen him relegated from the tour. However, he received the fourth of eight spots available on the European Tour for non-qualified players to earn a new two-year tour card for the 2014–15 and 2015–16 seasons.

=== 2014/2015 season ===
Wasley won three matches to reach the final qualifying round of the Shanghai Masters, where he was narrowly beaten 5–4 by Dominic Dale. At the European Tour event the Victoria Bulgarian Open, Wasley faced Judd Trump in the last 16 and made a 133 break to send the match into a deciding frame in which he made a 75 break from 73–0 down to play Peter Ebdon in the quarter-finals and lost 4–1. He would go on to finish 29th on the Order of Merit, just outside the top 24 who qualified for the Grand Final. His best runs in full ranking events this season were a pair of last 32 exits at the German Masters (5–1 to Shaun Murphy) and the Welsh Open (4–2 to Trump). He failed to repeat last year's World Championship performances as he lost 10–5 to Alan McManus in the first qualifying round.

=== 2015/2016 season ===
Wasley could only win two matches out of 17 during the whole of the 2015–16 season. He dropped off the tour at the end of the season as he was placed 87th in the world rankings and he did not enter the 2016 Q School.

== Performance and rankings timeline ==
Tournament	2010/ 11	2011/ 12	2012/ 13	2013/ 14	2014/ 15	2015/ 16
Ranking (Note: Shows the ranking at the beginning of the season)	(Note: He was an amateur)		(Note: New players on the Main Tour don't have a ranking)	80	(Note: Players qualified through European Tour Order of Merit started the season without prize money ranking points)	92
Ranking tournaments
Australian Goldfields Open	NH	A	LQ	LQ	LQ	LQ
Shanghai Masters	A	A	A	LQ	LQ	LQ
International Championship	Not Held		LQ	LQ	LQ	LQ
UK Championship	A	A	LQ	1R	1R	1R
German Masters	A	A	1R	LQ	1R	LQ
Welsh Open	A	A	1R	1R	3R	1R
World Grand Prix	Tournament Not Held				NR	DNQ
Players Tour Championship Grand Final	DNQ	DNQ	DNQ	DNQ	DNQ	DNQ
China Open	A	A	LQ	1R	LQ	LQ
World Championship	A	A	LQ	2R	LQ	LQ
Former ranking tournaments
World Open	LQ	A	LQ	1R	Not Held	
Wuxi Classic	Non-Ranking		LQ	1R	LQ	NH
Indian Open	Tournament Not Held			LQ	LQ	NH

Performance Table Legend
LQ	lost in the qualifying draw	#R	lost in the early rounds of the tournament (WR = Wildcard round, RR = Round robin)	QF	lost in the quarter-finals
SF	lost in the semi-finals	F	lost in the final	W	won the tournament
DNQ	did not qualify for the tournament	A	did not participate in the tournament	WD	withdrew from the tournament

NH / Not Held	means an event was not held
NR / Non-Ranking Event	means an event is/was no longer a ranking event
R / Ranking Event	means an event is/was a ranking event
MR / Minor-Ranking Event	means an event is/was a minor-ranking event
