= 2016 Champion of Champions =

2016 Dafabet Champion of Champions
Tournament information
- Dates: 7–12 November 2016
- Venue: Ricoh Arena
- City: Coventry
- Country: England
- Organisation: Matchroom Sport
- Format: Non-ranking event
- Total prize fund: £300,000
- Winner's share: £100,000
- Highest break: John Higgins (SCO) (143)

Final
- Champion: John Higgins (SCO)
- Runner-up: Ronnie O'Sullivan (ENG)
- Score: 10–7

The 2016 Champion of Champions (officially the 2016 Dafabet Champion of Champions) was a professional non-ranking snooker tournament that took place between 7 and 12 November 2016 at the Ricoh Arena in Coventry, England. It was the fourth staging of the tournament since it was revived in 2013. In the United Kingdom the tournament was broadcast on ITV4.

Neil Robertson was the defending champion, but he was beaten 2–4 in the Group 1 semi-final by Stuart Bingham.

== Prize fund ==
The breakdown of prize money for 2016 is shown below:

- Winner: £100,000
- Runner-up: £50,000
- Losing semi-finalist: £25,000
- Group runner-up: £10,000
- First round losers: £7,500
- Total: £300,000

== Players ==
Players qualified for the event by winning important tournaments since the previous Champion of Champions. Entry was guaranteed for the defending champion, winners of rankings events and winners of the following non-rankings events: 2016 Masters, 2016 Championship League and 2016 China Championship. Remaining places were then allocated to winners of European Tour events (in the order they were played) and then, if required, to winners of the 2016 Snooker Shoot-Out, 2016 Six-red World Championship and 2016 World Seniors Championship. Ding Junhui was awarded a wildcard for being this year's World Championship runner-up, but later qualified on his own right by winning the Six-red World Championship and 2016 Shanghai Masters.

With several players winning more than one tournament, there were fewer than 16 players who qualified by winning tournaments. Remaining places were allocated to the highest ranked player, not already qualified, on the one-year ranking list. After the 2016 International Championship there had only been 14 different winners and, with only one event left, Stuart Bingham, who was 8th in the one-year ranking list, qualified at that stage. The final place was left for the winner of the 2016 China Championship, a non-ranking event. During the China Championship Marco Fu withdrew and Joe Perry, 9th on the one-year ranking list, replaced him. At that stage John Higgins was the only non-qualified player left in the China Championship and, since he was 10th on the one-year ranking list, he therefore became the final qualifier. Moreover, he subsequently went on to win the tournament by beating Ronnie O'Sullivan 10–7 in the final.

The following players qualified for the tournament:

Seed	Player	Qualified as	Ref.
1	(Australia) Neil Robertson	Winner of 2015 Champion of Champions, 2015 UK Championship and 2016 Riga Masters	
2	(England) Mark Selby	Winner of 2016 World Snooker Championship, 2016 Gdynia Open, 2016 Paul Hunter Classic and 2016 International Championship	
3	(England) Ronnie O'Sullivan	Winner of 2016 Masters and 2016 Welsh Open	
4	(England) Shaun Murphy	Winner of 2016 World Grand Prix	
	(Northern Ireland) Mark Allen	Winner of 2016 Players Championship Grand Final	
	(England) Judd Trump	Winner of 2016 China Open, 2016 Championship League and 2016 European Masters	
	(China) Ding Junhui	Winner of 2016 Six-red World Championship and 2016 Shanghai Masters	
	(England) Martin Gould	Winner of 2016 German Masters	
w/d	(Hong Kong) Marco Fu	Winner of 2015 Gibraltar Open	
	(Scotland) Anthony McGill	Winner of 2016 Indian Open	
	(England) Ali Carter	Winner of 2016 World Open	
	(Finland) Robin Hull	Winner of 2016 Snooker Shoot-Out	
	(England) Mark Davis	Winner of 2016 World Seniors Championship	
	(China) Liang Wenbo	Winner of 2016 English Open	
	(Scotland) John Higgins	Winner of 2016 China Championship	
	(England) Stuart Bingham	Highest ranked player, not already qualified, on the one-year ranking list after 2016 International Championship	
	(England) Joe Perry	Qualified from the one-year ranking list after Marco Fu's withdrawal	

Four players were seeded. The seedings were determined in early October. Defending champion Neil Robertson was the 1st seed, while Mark Selby and Ronnie O'Sullivan were seeded 2nd and 3rd respectively for being the winner of last season's Triple Crown events. As Robertson was seeded twice for winning the UK Championship, Shaun Murphy became the 4th seed for being the highest ranked player not seeded after the 2016 Shanghai Masters.

== Main draw ==
Group semi-finals (last 16); Best of 7 frames
1	(Australia) Neil Robertson	2
(England) Stuart Bingham	4
Group 1 (8 November)
(China) Ding Junhui	4
(England) Ali Carter	2
(England) Judd Trump	4
(Scotland) Anthony McGill	3
Group 4 (10 November)
4	(England) Shaun Murphy	2
(Scotland) John Higgins	4
3	(England) Ronnie O'Sullivan	4
(Finland) Robin Hull	2
Group 3 (7 November)
(England) Martin Gould	4
(England) Mark Davis	3
(Northern Ireland) Mark Allen	4
(England) Joe Perry	2
Group 2 (9 November)
2	(England) Mark Selby	4
(China) Liang Wenbo	0

Group finals (quarter-finals); Best of 11 frames
(England) Stuart Bingham	4
(China) Ding Junhui	6
(England) Judd Trump	4
(Scotland) John Higgins	6
3	(England) Ronnie O'Sullivan	6
(England) Martin Gould	2
(Northern Ireland) Mark Allen	6
2	(England) Mark Selby	5

Semi-finals; Best of 11 frames
(China) Ding Junhui	5
(Scotland) John Higgins	6
3	(England) Ronnie O'Sullivan	6
(Northern Ireland) Mark Allen	2

Final; Best of 19 frames
(Scotland) John Higgins	10
3	(England) Ronnie O'Sullivan	7

== Final ==
Final: Best of 19 frames. Referee: Brendan Moore. Ricoh Arena, Coventry, England, 12 November 2016.
John Higgins; Scotland	10–7	Ronnie O'Sullivan (3); England
Afternoon: 75–0 (75), 19–69 (68), 74–3 (74), 1–100 (88), 0–90 (90), 79–0 (79), 74–4 (65), 29–88 (61), 48–82; Evening: 62–23 (60), 64–21 (63), 0–77 (74), 88–0 (83), 0–134 (130), 76–0 (76), 86–1 (86), 113–0 (58)
86	Highest break	130
0	Century breaks	1
10	50+ breaks	6

== Century breaks ==
- 143, 112 – John Higgins
- 142, 135, 125, 107, 102 – Ding Junhui
- 132, 124, 111 – Judd Trump
- 132 – Stuart Bingham
- 130, 130, 124, 121, 109, 101 – Ronnie O'Sullivan
- 116, 109, 100 – Mark Allen
- 113, 101 – Mark Selby
- 103 – Martin Gould
