= 2025 British Seniors Open =

December 2025 seniors snooker tournament

Tournament information
- Dates: 26–28 December 2025
- Venue: Vaillant Live
- City: Derby
- Country: England
- Organisation: World Seniors Snooker
- Format: Seniors event
- Highest break: Joe Perry (ENG) (131)

Final
- Champion: Joe Perry (ENG)
- Runner-up: Jimmy White (ENG)
- Score: 7–5

The 2025 British Seniors Open (officially the 2025 JenningsBet British Seniors Open) was a snooker tournament that took place from 26 to 28 December 2025 at the Vaillant Live in Derby, England. Organised by World Seniors Snooker, the event was broadcast in the United Kingdom by Channel 5.

Joe Perry won the event, defeating Jimmy White 7‍–‍5 in the final. The tournament produced 3 centuries, the highest being a 131 by Perry in the semi-finals.

== Overview ==
=== Format ===
The event was a single-elimination knockout tournament consisting of three rounds, with the quarter-finals being played as the best of seven frames, the semi-finals as the best of nine frames, and the final as the best of 13 frames.

In the event that any match was tied with a single frame to be played, the deciding frame was replaced by a respotted black.

=== Participants ===
The tournament featured eight selected participants, with Matthew Stevens, Anthony Hamilton and Stuart Bingham making their World Seniors debut in the event. Stevens and Bingham were eligible to play in a World Seniors event for the first time after a compact between World Snooker Tour and World Seniors Snooker, that previously prohibited players ranked inside the top 64 of the main professional tour from participating in Seniors events, expired after the 2025 World Seniors Championship.

=== Broadcasters ===
The tournament was broadcast domestically in the United Kingdom by 5 and 5Action. It was also broadcast in China by Migu TV.

== Summary ==
In the quarter-finals, reigning World Seniors champion Alfie Burden whitewashed Dominic Dale 4‍–‍0 while Jimmy White came from 0‍–‍2 behind to defeat Ken Doherty 4‍–‍2, making breaks of 58, 66 and 66. Matthew Stevens won the only black-ball shootout of the event to defeat Anthony Hamilton 4‍–‍3 and Joe Perry whitewashed top-ranked player of the tournament Stuart Bingham 4‍–‍0.

In the semi-finals, White again fell 0‍–‍2 behind against Burden, who made a 101 century break in the second frame, but White eventually defeated Burden 5‍–‍3, making breaks of 79, 79, 59 and 95. Perry met Stevens in a match that included 7 breaks of over 50, with Perry defeating Stevens 5‍–‍3. Perry made the highest break of the tournament, a 131, in the sixth frame of the match.

The final was contested between Jimmy White and Joe Perry and refereed by Tatiana Woollaston. Perry took the opening frame before White took the next two to lead 2‍–‍1. Perry made breaks of 61 and 64 to win the fourth and his second century break of the event in the fifth to lead 3‍–‍2 but White won a close sixth frame with a clearance from brown to black to equal the scoreline at 3‍–‍3. White also took the seventh frame before Perry won two frames in a row to lead 5‍–‍4. White then made an 82 break in the tenth to level the scores again at 5‍–‍5 but Perry subsequently won the next two frames, making breaks of 95 and 73, to defeat White 7‍–‍5 and win the first World Seniors Snooker title of his career.

== Tournament draw ==
The draw of the tournament is shown below. Numbers in parentheses after the players' names denote the players' seeding and players in bold denote match winners.

**Quarter-finals**; Best of 7 frames
**Alfie Burden (ENG) (1)**	**4**
Dominic Dale (WAL)	0
**Jimmy White (ENG)**	**4**
Ken Doherty (IRL) (4)	2
**Matthew Stevens (WAL) (3)**	**4**
Anthony Hamilton (ENG)	3
**Joe Perry (ENG)**	**4**
Stuart Bingham (ENG) (2)	0

**Semi-finals**; Best of 9 frames
(England) Alfie Burden (1)	3
**(England) Jimmy White**	**5**
(Wales) Matthew Stevens (3)	3
**(England) Joe Perry**	**5**

**Final**; Best of 13 frames
(England) Jimmy White	5
**(England) Joe Perry**	**7**

=== Final ===
Final: Best of 13 frames. Referee: Tatiana Woollaston; Vaillant Live, Derby, England, 28 December 2025
Jimmy White; England	5–**7**	**Joe Perry**; England
5–**82**, **56**–38, **51**–48, 12–**126**, 9–**101** (100), **66**–57, **67**–16, 11–**79**, 34–**77**, **116**–1, 39–**95**, 2–**78** (73)
(frame 11) 82	Highest break	**100** (frame 5)
0	Century breaks	**1**

== Century breaks ==
A total of 3 century breaks were made during the tournament.

- 131, 100 – Joe Perry
- 101 – Alfie Burden
