= Players Tour Championship 2011/2012 – Event 1 =

Players Tour Championship 2011/2012 Event 1
Tournament information
- Dates: 18–22 June 2011
- Venue: World Snooker Academy
- City: Sheffield
- Country: England
- Organisation: World Snooker
- Format: Minor-ranking event
- Total prize fund: £50,000
- Winner's share: £10,000
- Highest break: Kurt Maflin (NOR) (145)

Final
- Champion: Ronnie O'Sullivan (ENG)
- Runner-up: Joe Perry (ENG)
- Score: 4–0

The Players Tour Championship 2011/2012 – Event 1 was a professional minor-ranking snooker tournament that took place between 18 and 22 June 2011 at the World Snooker Academy in Sheffield, England.

Ronnie O'Sullivan won his first title carrying ranking points since the 2009 Shanghai Masters 21 months earlier by defeating Joe Perry 4–0 in the final.

== Prize fund and ranking points ==
The breakdown of prize money and ranking points of the event is shown below:

	Prize fund	Ranking points^{1}
Winner	£10,000	2,000
Runner-up	£5,000	1,600
Semi-finalist	£2,500	1,280
Quarter-finalist	£1,500	1,000
Last 16	£1,000	760
Last 32	£600	560
Last 64	£200	360
Total	£50,000	–

- ^{1} Only professional players can earn ranking points.

== Main draw ==
=== Preliminary rounds ===
==== Round 1 ====
Best of 7 frames

(England) Hammad Miah	2–4	(England) Oliver Lines
(England) Ian Stark	4–0	(England) Sachin Plaha
(Wales) Jak Jones	3–4	(England) Kyren Wilson
(Wales) Stephen Ellis	1–4	(Wales) Kishan Hirani
(England) Joel Walker	4–0	(Republic of Ireland) Dessie Sheehan
(England) Brian Cox	3–4	(England) Ben Harrison
(Wales) Alex Taubman	4–0	(England) Martin Ball
(England) George Marter	1–4	(England) Martin O'Donnell
(Republic of Ireland) Jonathan Friel	0–4	(England) Allan Taylor
(Pakistan) Shahram Changezi	4–2	(England) Bash Maqsood
(England) Declan Bristow	2–4	(England) Darren Bond
(England) James Murdoch	4–1	(Wales) Callum Lloyd
(Wales) Gareth Allen	4–0	(England) Sydney Wilson
(China) Chen Zhe	4–1	(England) James Silverwood
(England) Shaun Wilkes	4–1	(England) Lee Richardson
(Poland) Grzegorz Biernadski	3–4	(England) Lewis Frampton
(England) Lee Page	4–0	(England) Terry Buchan
(Germany) Lasse Münstermann	w/d–w/o	(England) Steve Judd
(Republic of Ireland) John Sutton	4–1	(England) Phil O'Kane
(England) James Hill	0–4	(England) Mitchell Mann
(England) Sam Harvey	4–3	(England) Saqib Nasir
(Republic of Ireland) Leo Fernandez	3–4	(England) Nick Jennings
(England) Liam Monk	4–1	(Scotland) Marc Davis

(England) Andy Lee	4–3	(England) David Birley
(England) David Bailey	0–4	(England) Michael Wild
(China) Zhang Anda	4–2	(England) Ryan Causton
(England) Steven Hallworth	0–4	(England) Matthew Day
(England) Christopher Keogan	2–4	(England) Reanne Evans
(England) Ian Glover	4–0	(England) Tony Knowles
(England) James Frith	w/o–w/d	(Republic of Ireland) Joe Delaney
(Scotland) Sean James Riach	0–4	(England) Andrew Milliard
(England) Damian Wilks	4–1	(England) Oliver Brown
(England) Craig Steadman	4–1	(England) Callum Downing
(England) Elliot Slessor	4–2	(England) Rock Hui
(England) Mike Hallett	4–3	(Wales) Duane Jones
(England) Jordan Rimmer	4–1	(England) Steve Ventham
(England) Zak Surety	2–4	(England) Lee Farebrother
(England) Robert Tickner	0–4	(England) Jamie Barrett
(India) Mohammed Raoof	0–4	(England) David Gray
(England) Robert Valiant	2–4	(England) Les Dodd
(Poland) Michal Zielinski	4–1	(England) John Woods
(England) Gary Wilson	4–1	(Belgium) Hans Blanckaert
(England) James Cahill	0–4	(England) Chris Norbury
(Republic of Ireland) Michael Judge	0–4	(England) Farakh Ajaib
(Wales) Andrew Rogers	4–2	(England) Jake Nicholson
(England) Jack Bradford	0–4	(England) Justin Astley

==== Round 2 ====
Best of 7 frames

(England) Mitchell Travis	4–1	(England) Oliver Lines
(England) Ian Stark	0–4	(England) Kyren Wilson
(England) Brian Robertson	3–4	(Wales) Kishan Hirani
(England) Joel Walker	2–4	(England) Ben Harrison
(England) Shane Castle	4–2	(Wales) Alex Taubman
(England) Ian Burns	4–2	(England) Martin O'Donnell
(England) Allan Taylor	4–2	(Pakistan) Shahram Changezi
(England) Billy Joe Castle	3–4	(England) Darren Bond
(England) James Murdoch	4–0	(Wales) Gareth Allen
(England) Jamie O' Neill	1–4	(China) Chen Zhe
(England) Shaun Wilkes	4–0	(England) Lewis Frampton
(England) Michael Wasley	4–3	(England) Lee Page
(England) Steve Judd	1–4	(Republic of Ireland) John Sutton
(England) Gareth Green	4–3	(England) Mitchell Mann
(England) Robbie Williams	4–3	(England) Sam Harvey
(England) James Welsh	2–4	(England) Nick Jennings

(England) Liam Monk	2–4	(England) Andy Lee
(England) Michael Wild	0–4	(China) Zhang Anda
(England) Jamie Walker	3–4	(England) Matthew Day
(England) Reanne Evans	2–4	(England) Ian Glover
(England) James McGouran	4–1	(England) James Frith
(England) Andrew Milliard	4–3	(England) Damian Wilks
(England) Ashley Wright	0–4	(England) Craig Steadman
(England) Elliot Slessor	3–4	(England) Mike Hallett
(England) Sean O'Sullivan	4–1	(England) Jordan Rimmer
(England) Lee Farebrother	2–4	(England) Jamie Barrett
(Northern Ireland) Patrick Wallace	w/d–w/o	(England) David Gray
(England) Kristian Willetts	2–4	(England) Les Dodd
(Poland) Michal Zielinski	2–4	(England) Gary Wilson
(England) Danny Brindle	0–4	(England) Chris Norbury
(Scotland) Eden Sharav	4–2	(England) Farakh Ajaib
(Wales) Andrew Rogers	0–4	(England) Justin Astley

=== Main rounds ===
==== Top half ====
===== Section 1 =====
Last 128; Best of 7 frames
(Wales) Mark Williams	3
(China) Li Yan	4
(England) Steve Davis	1
(Thailand) James Wattana	4
(England) Mike Dunn	4
(England) Mitchell Travis	0
(Scotland) Stephen Hendry	3
(England) Kyren Wilson	4
(Republic of Ireland) Ken Doherty	4
(Wales) Kishan Hirani	0
(England) Tom Ford	4
(England) Andrew Norman	0
(England) Mark Joyce	4
(England) Ben Harrison	0
(England) Joe Perry	4
(England) Sanderson Lam	0

Last 64; Best of 7 frames
(China) Li Yan	3
(Thailand) James Wattana	4
(England) Mike Dunn	4
(England) Kyren Wilson	2
(Republic of Ireland) Ken Doherty	1
(England) Tom Ford	4
(England) Mark Joyce	2
(England) Joe Perry	4

Last 32; Best of 7 frames
(Thailand) James Wattana	4
(England) Mike Dunn	1
(England) Tom Ford	3
(England) Joe Perry	4

Last 16; Best of 7 frames
(Thailand) James Wattana	0
(England) Joe Perry	4

===== Section 2 =====
Last 128; Best of 7 frames
(England) Alfie Burden	3
(China) Cao Yupeng	4
(Wales) Jamie Jones	4
(England) Shane Castle	0
(England) Peter Lines	4
(England) Ian Burns	2
(England) Anthony Hamilton	0
(Belgium) Luca Brecel	4
(Northern Ireland) Joe Swail	4
(England) Allan Taylor	3
(Republic of Ireland) Fergal O'Brien	4
(England) Darren Bond	2
(England) Robert Milkins	4
(England) Stuart Carrington	2
(Wales) Ryan Day	3
(England) Simon Bedford	4

Last 64; Best of 7 frames
(China) Cao Yupeng	2
(Wales) Jamie Jones	4
(England) Peter Lines	4
(Belgium) Luca Brecel	3
(Northern Ireland) Joe Swail	1
(Republic of Ireland) Fergal O'Brien	4
(England) Robert Milkins	3
(England) Simon Bedford	4

Last 32; Best of 7 frames
(Wales) Jamie Jones	4
(England) Peter Lines	2
(Republic of Ireland) Fergal O'Brien	4
(England) Simon Bedford	2

Last 16; Best of 7 frames
(Wales) Jamie Jones	4
(Republic of Ireland) Fergal O'Brien	3

===== Section 3 =====
Last 128; Best of 7 frames
(China) Xiao Guodong	4
(England) James Murdoch	0
(Malta) Tony Drago	3
(England) Adam Wicheard	4
(Wales) Michael White	4
(England) David Grace	1
(England) Rory McLeod	2
(Norway) Kurt Maflin	4
(England) Liam Highfield	4
(China) Chen Zhe	2
(Wales) Andrew Pagett	4
(England) Shaun Wilkes	3
(England) Mark King	4
(Republic of Ireland) David Hogan	0
(England) Rod Lawler	3
(Scotland) Scott MacKenzie	4

Last 64; Best of 7 frames
(China) Xiao Guodong	4
(England) Adam Wicheard	1
(Wales) Michael White	2
(Norway) Kurt Maflin	4
(England) Liam Highfield	4
(Wales) Andrew Pagett	2
(England) Mark King	1
(Scotland) Scott MacKenzie	4

Last 32; Best of 7 frames
(China) Xiao Guodong	4
(Norway) Kurt Maflin	3
(England) Liam Highfield	4
(Scotland) Scott MacKenzie	0

Last 16; Best of 7 frames
(China) Xiao Guodong	4
(England) Liam Highfield	2

===== Section 4 =====
Last 128; Best of 7 frames
(England) Andrew Higginson	4
(England) Michael Wasley	3
(England) Stephen Lee	4
(Republic of Ireland) John Sutton	1
(Scotland) Graeme Dott	4
(England) Sam Baird	0
(Wales) Dominic Dale	4
(England) Gareth Green	1
(England) Peter Ebdon	2
(England) Robbie Williams	4
(England) Shaun Murphy	3
(England) Nick Jennings	4
(England) Ali Carter	4
(China) Yu Delu	1
(Wales) Matthew Stevens	4
(England) Andy Lee	0

Last 64; Best of 7 frames
(England) Andrew Higginson	1
(England) Stephen Lee	4
(Scotland) Graeme Dott	4
(Wales) Dominic Dale	2
(England) Robbie Williams	4
(England) Nick Jennings	2
(England) Ali Carter	4
(Wales) Matthew Stevens	0

Last 32; Best of 7 frames
(England) Stephen Lee	0
(Scotland) Graeme Dott	4
(England) Robbie Williams	4
(England) Ali Carter	2

Last 16; Best of 7 frames
(Scotland) Graeme Dott	4
(England) Robbie Williams	0

==== Bottom half ====
===== Section 5 =====
Last 128; Best of 7 frames
(England) Mark Selby	4
(China) Zhang Anda	1
(Northern Ireland) Gerard Greene	4
(India) Aditya Mehta	3
(Scotland) Stephen Maguire	4
(England) Matthew Day	3
(England) Jack Lisowski	4
(England) Ian Glover	1
(England) Mark Davis	4
(England) James McGouran	2
(England) Barry Hawkins	4
(China) Tian Pengfei	1
(England) Stuart Bingham	4
(England) Andrew Milliard	0
(Scotland) Jamie Burnett	4
(Finland) Robin Hull	2

Last 64; Best of 7 frames
(England) Mark Selby	4
(Northern Ireland) Gerard Greene	0
(Scotland) Stephen Maguire	4
(England) Jack Lisowski	2
(England) Mark Davis	4
(England) Barry Hawkins	1
(England) Stuart Bingham	4
(Scotland) Jamie Burnett	0

Last 32; Best of 7 frames
(England) Mark Selby	2
(Scotland) Stephen Maguire	4
(England) Mark Davis	3
(England) Stuart Bingham	4

Last 16; Best of 7 frames
(Scotland) Stephen Maguire	3
(England) Stuart Bingham	4

===== Section 6 =====
Last 128; Best of 7 frames
(England) Adrian Gunnell	2
(England) Craig Steadman	4
(Belgium) Bjorn Haneveer	4
(Northern Ireland) Joe Meara	1
(England) Ronnie O'Sullivan	4
(England) Mike Hallett	2
(England) Andy Hicks	4
(England) Sean O'Sullivan	2
(England) Matthew Selt	4
(England) Stephen Craigie	2
(England) Martin Gould	4
(England) Jamie Barrett	2
(England) Dave Harold	1
(England) Sam Craigie	4
(England) Nigel Bond	4
(England) Ben Woollaston	2

Last 64; Best of 7 frames
(England) Craig Steadman	1
(Belgium) Bjorn Haneveer	4
(England) Ronnie O'Sullivan	4
(England) Andy Hicks	1
(England) Matthew Selt	3
(England) Martin Gould	4
(England) Sam Craigie	1
(England) Nigel Bond	4

Last 32; Best of 7 frames
(Belgium) Bjorn Haneveer	0
(England) Ronnie O'Sullivan	4
(England) Martin Gould	4
(England) Nigel Bond	3

Last 16; Best of 7 frames
(England) Ronnie O'Sullivan	4
(England) Martin Gould	2

===== Section 7 =====
Last 128; Best of 7 frames
(England) Matthew Couch	4
(India) Lucky Vatnani	0
(England) Michael Holt	4
(England) David Gray	1
(England) Joe Jogia	4
(Wales) Daniel Wells	0
(China) Liu Chuang	4
(England) Jack Culligan	0
(England) Jamie Cope	4
(England) Les Dodd	0
(England) Judd Trump	1
(England) David Gilbert	4
(Scotland) Alan McManus	4
(Poland) Kacper Filipiak	1
(England) Jimmy White	4
(Republic of Ireland) David Morris	3

Last 64; Best of 7 frames
(England) Matthew Couch	2
(England) Michael Holt	4
(England) Joe Jogia	4
(China) Liu Chuang	1
(England) Jamie Cope	2
(England) David Gilbert	4
(Scotland) Alan McManus	3
(England) Jimmy White	4

Last 32; Best of 7 frames
(England) Michael Holt	2
(England) Joe Jogia	4
(England) David Gilbert	4
(England) Jimmy White	1

Last 16; Best of 7 frames
(England) Joe Jogia	4
(England) David Gilbert	3

===== Section 8 =====
Last 128; Best of 7 frames
(Scotland) Anthony McGill	3
(England) Gary Wilson	4
(England) Barry Pinches	4
(England) Chris Norbury	2
(China) Liu Song	0
(England) Adam Duffy	4
(China) Liang Wenbo	0
(Scotland) Eden Sharav	4
(Scotland) Marcus Campbell	4
(England) Paul Davison	3
(England) Jimmy Robertson	3
(Thailand) Passakorn Suwannawat	4
(England) Ricky Walden	2
(England) Justin Astley	4
(Scotland) John Higgins	3
(Thailand) Dechawat Poomjaeng	4

Last 64; Best of 7 frames
(England) Gary Wilson	4
(England) Barry Pinches	3
(England) Adam Duffy	1
(Scotland) Eden Sharav	4
(Scotland) Marcus Campbell	4
(Thailand) Passakorn Suwannawat	1
(England) Justin Astley	3
(Thailand) Dechawat Poomjaeng	4

Last 32; Best of 7 frames
(England) Gary Wilson	2
(Scotland) Eden Sharav	4
(Scotland) Marcus Campbell	4
(Thailand) Dechawat Poomjaeng	2

Last 16; Best of 7 frames
(Scotland) Eden Sharav	0
(Scotland) Marcus Campbell	4

==== Finals ====
Quarter-finals; Best of 7 frames		Semi-finals; Best of 7 frames		Final; Best of 7 frames
(England) Joe Perry	4
(Wales) Jamie Jones	1	(England) Joe Perry	4
(China) Xiao Guodong	3	(Scotland) Graeme Dott	2
(Scotland) Graeme Dott	4			(England) Joe Perry	0
(England) Stuart Bingham	2			(England) Ronnie O'Sullivan	4
(England) Ronnie O'Sullivan	4	(England) Ronnie O'Sullivan	4
(England) Joe Jogia	4	(England) Joe Jogia	2
(Scotland) Marcus Campbell	1

== Century breaks ==
Only from last 128 onwards.

- 145 – Kurt Maflin
- 138 – Passakorn Suwannawat
- 132, 124, 120, 115, 108, 107, 104, 101 – Ronnie O'Sullivan
- 132, 104 – Dechawat Poomjaeng
- 128 – Graeme Dott
- 127, 106 – Xiao Guodong
- 125 – Dominic Dale
- 124 – Gareth Green
- 122 – Alfie Burden
- 120, 113, 111, 110 – Joe Perry
- 120, 104 – Simon Bedford
- 119 – Mark Selby
- 117, 106, 103 – Michael Holt
- 117 – Stephen Maguire
- 116 – Stephen Lee
- 115 – Stuart Bingham
- 115 – Ken Doherty
- 112 – Mark Joyce
- 108, 105 – Jack Lisowski
- 108 – Marcus Campbell
- 107 – David Gilbert
- 106 – Cao Yupeng
- 105 – Joe Jogia
- 105 – Eden Sharav
- 104 – Andy Hicks
- 104 – Tom Ford
- 103 – David Morris
- 102 – Kyren Wilson
- 102 – Martin Gould
- 101, 101 – Jamie Jones
- 100 – Bjorn Haneveer
- 100 – Robert Milkins
