= Joe Perry (snooker player) =

English snooker player (born 1974)

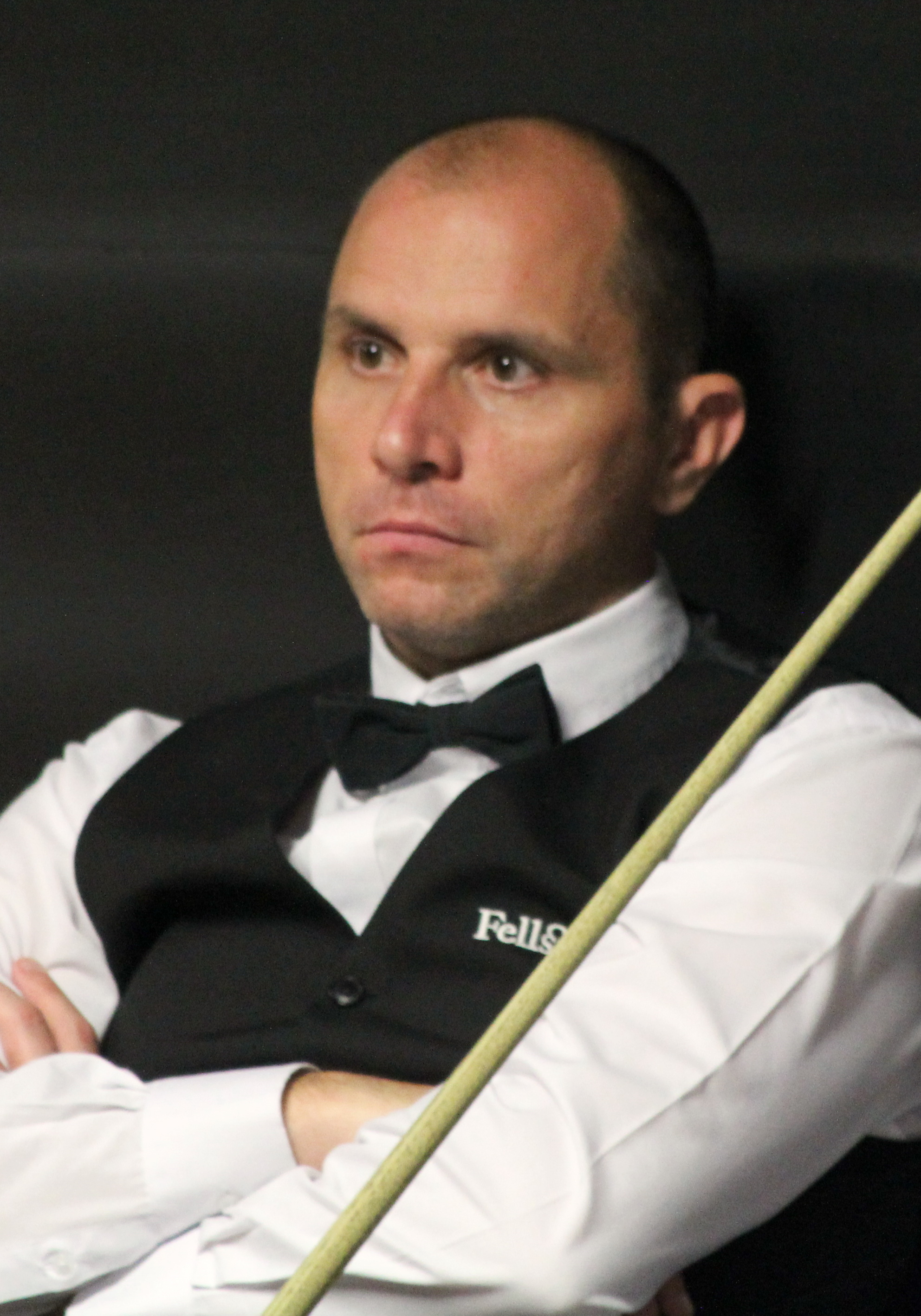
- Perry in 2016

Personal information
- Nickname: The Gentleman
- Born: 13 August 1974 (age 52)

Sport
- Country: England
- Sport: Snooker
- Professional: 1992–2025
- Highest ranking: 8 (December 2016)
- Century breaks: 378

Tournament wins
- Ranking: 2
- Minor-ranking: 2

Joe Perry (born 13 August 1974) is an English retired professional snooker player and a current commentator and pundit. Nicknamed "The Gentleman", he turned professional in 1992. On his Crucible debut at the 1999 World Snooker Championship, he defeated six-time World Champion Steve Davis 10–9 in the first round, winning the match on the last black ball. At the 2001 European Open, he reached his first ranking final, losing 2–9 to Stephen Hendry. He produced his career-best performances at the UK Championship when he reached back-to-back semi-finals in 2004 and 2005, losing respectively to David Gray and Ding Junhui. His best performance at the World Snooker Championship came when he reached the semi-finals in 2008, losing 15–17 to Ali Carter.

Perry played in his second ranking final at the 2014 Wuxi Classic, losing 9–10 to Neil Robertson. At the age of 40, he won his first ranking title at the 2015 Players Tour Championship Grand Final, defeating Mark Williams 4–3. He reached his fourth ranking final at the 2016 World Open, losing 8–10 to Carter. He contested the only Triple Crown final of his career when he faced Ronnie O'Sullivan at the 2017 Masters. Perry led 4–1, but O'Sullivan took seven consecutive frames to lead 8–4 and went on to win 10–7. Perry subsequently reached the final of the 2018 European Masters but lost 6–9 to Jimmy Robertson.

Perry reached his sixth ranking final and claimed his second ranking title at the 2022 Welsh Open, defeating Judd Trump 9–5 in the final. At the age of 47, he was then the second-oldest player to win a ranking title. After 33 consecutive seasons on the professional tour, he retired from professional competition at the end of the 2024–25 season, aged 50. He continues to compete on the World Seniors Tour, where he won the 2025 British Seniors Open and was runner-up at the 2026 World Seniors Championship. In 2024, he and his partner opened a snooker and pool hall in his hometown of Chatteris, Cambridgeshire.

== Career ==
=== 1999–2005 ===
Perry made his Crucible debut at the 1999 World Snooker Championship, where he faced six-time champion Steve Davis in the first round. Perry led 7–2, but Davis recovered to tie the scores at 9–9 and force a deciding frame. Davis led by 52 points in the decider when he missed the blue, and Perry made a clearance of 55 to win the match on the last black. Perry lost 8–13 in the second round to Ronnie O'Sullivan.

Perry's breakthrough came when he reached his first ranking final at the 2001 European Open. In the 2004 World Championship, he beat defending champion Mark Williams 13–11, and also made the tournament's highest break of 145 (which remains Perry's best in competition, only equalled in the 2023 Northern Ireland Open). He lost to Matthew Stevens in the quarter-finals. He repeated this run in 2008, when he defeated Graeme Dott and Stuart Bingham, and bettered it by going on to beat Stephen Maguire 13–12 and earn his place in the semi-finals, where he narrowly lost to Ali Carter. Previously, he had also reached the last 16 on his Crucible debut in 1999, beating Steve Davis on the final black in the last 32.

He reached the semi-finals of the UK Championship in both 2004 and 2005. The 2004 defeat was especially notable as Perry had led 8–7 and potted a colour to leave his opponent, David Gray, requiring a snooker – however, Perry's pot had also left him snookered on the final red, which he failed to hit, allowing Gray to clear the table and ultimately win the deciding frame with a total clearance of 139. This run left Perry provisionally fifth in the world, but he failed to win a match in the remaining five tournaments and dropped to 14th at the end of the season as a result. In 2005, he lost to eventual champion Ding Junhui.

=== 2007–2010 ===
In the 2007–08 season, Perry reached two quarter-finals: in the Grand Prix (losing 3–5 to Gerard Greene) and the Welsh Open (with victories over John Parrott 5–2, Peter Ebdon 5–1 and Stuart Bingham 5–2 before Shaun Murphy beat him 5–0), as well as the last 16 of the UK Championship, where he beat Neil Robertson 9–6 after being 3–5 down, before losing 2–9 to Marco Fu. He followed that up by reaching the semi-finals of the world championship, where he was knocked out by Ali Carter 15–17. These results ensured him a return to the prestigious top 16 of the rankings (at No. 12, his highest ranking ever), meaning automatic qualification for major tournaments. He also finished the 2007/2008 season on another high, by winning the Championship League, to qualify for the Betfred Premier League for 2008. He has said he feels that he is learning to cope with the high pressure of major tournaments, having had more experience over the last season.

Perry opened 2008–09 with three last-sixteen runs, leaving him inside the top eight of the provisional rankings. However he went one better in the 2008 UK Championship beating Ronnie O'Sullivan 9–5 having trailed by 3–5, in one of the best victories of his career. However, he lost 7–9 to Marco Fu in the quarter-finals. In the new year, he suffered a narrow 5–6 loss to O'Sullivan in the Masters; he failed to win a match in a ranking event during the remainder of the season. He was unable to repeat his 2008 run in the World Championship, losing 6–10 to an in-form Jamie Cope in the first round. This meant that he finished the season ranked at number 12. In 2009–10, he reached one quarter-final and dropped to 19th in the rankings. In the World Championship he beat Michael Holt in the first round 10–4, and trailed Ali Carter 6–10 before winning five frames in a row to lead 11–10 but lost 11–13.

=== 2011–2013 ===
Perry was a losing finalist in Event 1 (Ronnie O'Sullivan won 4–0) and Event 12 (Stephen Maguire won 4–2) during the minor-ranking 2011/2012 Players Tour Championship series. These results helped him qualify for the Finals as he finished 11th on the Order of Merit. It was at the Finals where Perry had his best run in a ranking event during the 2011–12 season as he beat Fergal O'Brien and Graeme Dott, before being defeated by Neil Robertson 1–4 in the quarter-finals. In the other ranking events during the year he reached the second round three times, culminating in a 7–13 defeat to Maguire in the World Championship. Perry finished the season ranked world number 24. He began the 2012–13 season by reaching the second round of the Wuxi Classic thanks to the withdrawal of Matthew Stevens and lost 4–5 to Ricky Walden. He was beaten 1–5 by Marco Fu in the first round of the Australian Goldfields Open, before recording his best result of the year at the Shanghai Masters. He beat Barry Pinches in qualifying, Stevens 5–2 in the first round and then whitewashed Neil Robertson 5–0 to make the quarter-finals. There was never a frame between Perry and Mark Williams in their quarter-final, with Perry making a 131 break to force a deciding frame which he lost. He won two more matches in ranking events during the rest of the season, the first being a 4–0 triumph over world number one Mark Selby in the first round of the Welsh Open.

He was knocked out 3–4 by veteran Alan McManus in the subsequent round. The second was in the PTC Finals which Perry had qualified for by finishing 20th on the Order of Merit. He beat Stuart Bingham 4–2, before losing 3–4 to Ben Woollaston. Perry's season ended when he was beaten 3–10 by world number 83 Sam Baird in the final round of World Championship Qualifying. His end of season ranking was world number 20.

=== First title ===
In June 2013, Perry won the first minor-ranking title of his 22-year professional career at the opening event of the Players Tour Championship, the Yixing Open, with a 4–1 defeat of Mark Selby in the final. A week later, he outplayed Ding Junhui in the second round of the Wuxi Classic to win 5–1 and then beat David Gilbert 5–2 in the following round, before being defeated 2–5 by John Higgins in the quarter-finals. Another quarter-final followed at the Australian Goldfields Open, where he was eliminated 2–5 by home favourite Neil Robertson.

Perry won a quarter-final at the third time of asking this season at the International Championship with a 6–1 victory over Ryan Day. His semi-final match against Marco Fu was extremely close and involved long spells of tactical play, as many frames lasted 40 minutes, which Fu edged 9–8 on the colours. He also participated in the 2013 World Games in Cali, Colombia, where he represented the UK. He won his first game against Brendan O'Donoghue but subsequently lost in the quarter-finals to eventual gold medalist Aditya Mehta.

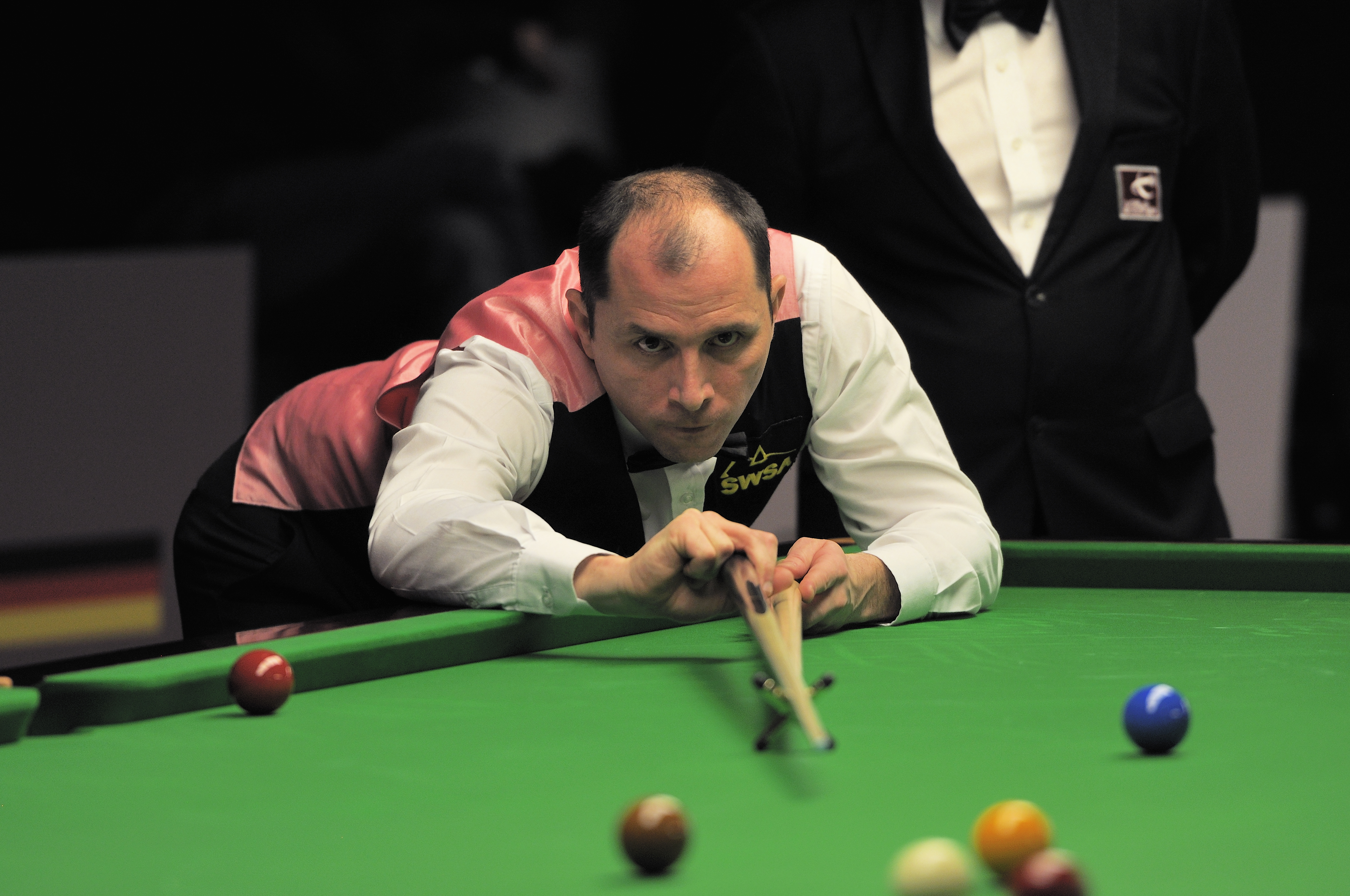
Perry at the 2014 German Masters

Perry's good play continued into 2014 as he advanced to the quarter-finals of the German Masters with the loss of just three frames, but he then lost 2–5 to Ding Junhui. He secured a 5–1 win over Selby in the quarter-finals of the Welsh Open, stating that his newfound casual approach to the game was a key reason for his successful season. However, it was Ding who once again halted his run in a ranking event as he beat Perry 6–4. A sixth quarter-final appearance of the season came at the PTC Finals, but he lost 2–4 to Judd Trump. He fought back from 3–6 down after the opening session of his first round match with Jamie Burnett at the World Championship to win 10–7 and set up a second round clash with reigning champion Ronnie O'Sullivan. Perry started the better of the two as he established a 5–3 lead after the opening session and maintained his two-frame advantage after the second, although he missed a chance in the final frame to be 10–6 ahead. He went on to lead 11–9, before O'Sullivan leveled the match and then made back-to-back century breaks to win 13–11, with Perry remarking afterwards that he had been "blown away by a genius" in the last few frames.

Perry said that if he could maintain his own attitude and mindset he would win his first major ranking title in the future. He ended the campaign as the world number 15, inside the top 16 for the first time in five years.

=== Major success ===
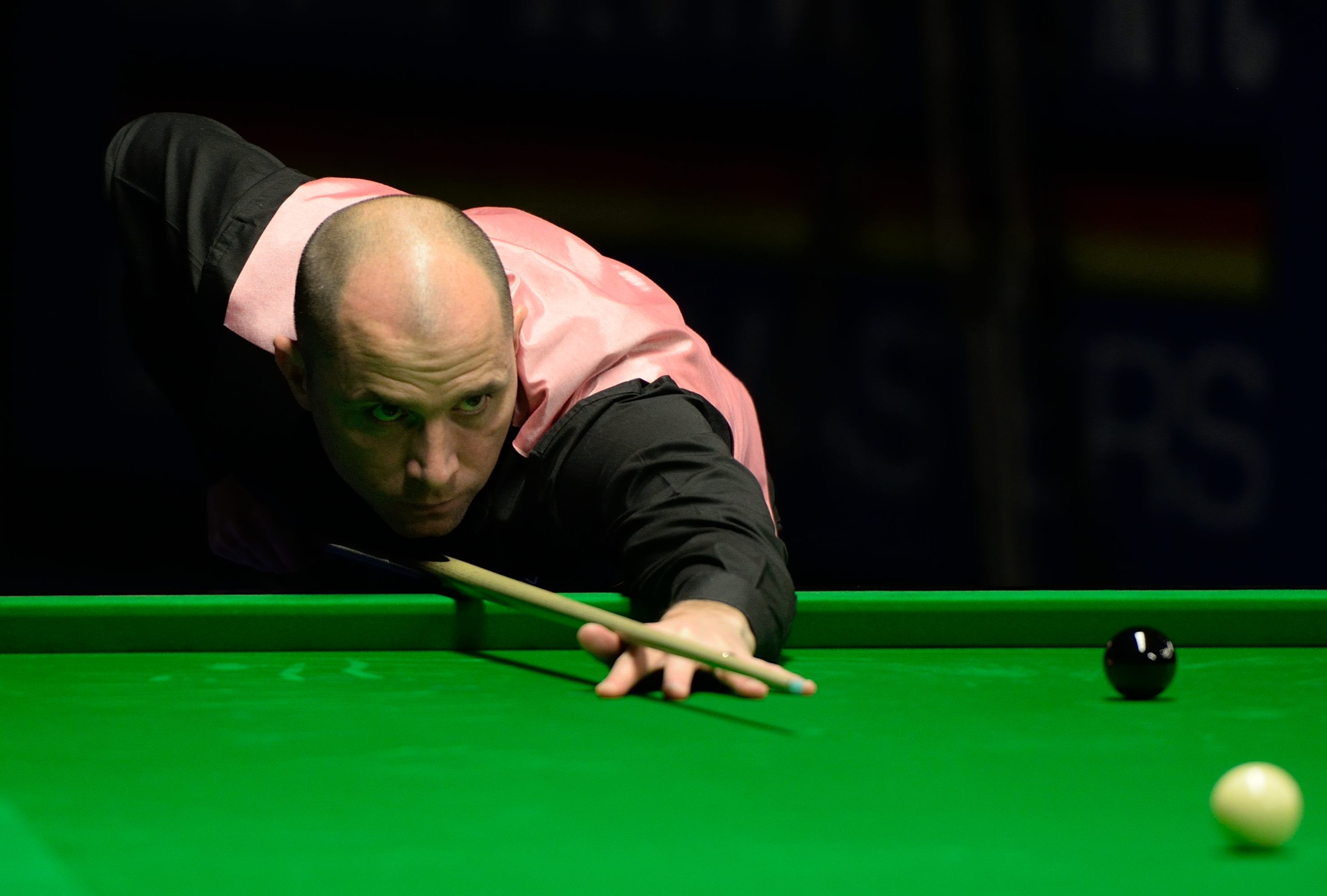
Perry at the 2015 German Masters

At the 2014 Wuxi Classic, Perry dropped just four frames to reach the semi-finals and then beat Martin Gould 6–4 to reach his second career ranking final and the first in 13 years. He played friend and practice partner Neil Robertson and from 6–8 down won three unanswered frames to stand on the edge of his first ranking title, but Robertson then made breaks of 87 and 78 to edge Perry out 10–9. Afterwards, Robertson suggested that Perry's talent should see him become a top ten player in the future. Perry failed to advance beyond the last 32 in the next four ranking events.

It has been a lifelong ambition for me. I've been playing snooker since I was 12, and all I've ever wanted to do is win a major tournament. When I lost 10–9 in the final in Wuxi I thought that might have been my chance. So I'm delighted to do it at last.

— Perry on winning his first ranking title at the 2015 Players Championship Grand Final.

Perry defeated Ding Junhui 6–3 in the first round of the Masters, his first ever win in the tournament, but then lost 4–6 to Mark Allen with both players missing a catalogue of easy balls during the match which Allen described as "a comedy of errors" afterwards. However, less than a week later, Perry won the Xuzhou Open by beating Thepchaiya Un-Nooh 4–1 in the final to claim his second Asian Tour title in as many years.

Perry's form on the PTC circuit saw him seeded seventh for the Grand Final in Bangkok, Thailand. He defeated Ding Junhui 4–1, Anthony McGill 4–3 from 1–3 down, and Michael Holt and Stuart Bingham 4–1 each to reach his third major ranking final and second of the season. He recovered from 0–3 down against Mark Williams to win 4–3 and claim the first major title of his 23-year playing career, in addition to his highest prize earning of £100,000 and a place inside the world's top ten. When Perry finished the season at ninth in the rankings it marked his highest year-end ranking to date.

A pair of 5–3 wins over Jamie Burnett and Robert Milkins helped Perry to the quarter-finals of the 2015 Australian Goldfields Open, where he was on the wrong end of a 5–3 scoreline against John Higgins. His second quarter-final of the 2015–16 season was also against Higgins at the International Championship and he recovered from 0–4 down to make it 3–5, but then lost the next frame. Perry's ranking event title from last season saw him make his debut in the Champion of Champions and he beat Michael White 4–2 to face Higgins in the quarter-finals once again. There was never more than a frame between the two players and Perry came from 4–5 down to triumph 6–5. In the semi-finals he lost 6–4 to Neil Robertson.

After losing 3–6 to Robbie Williams in the second round of the 2015 UK Championship, Perry called his opponent's style and speed of play "a joke". At the Welsh Open he beat Judd Trump 4–3 in the fourth round and Ben Woollaston 5–1 in the quarter-finals to meet Ronnie O'Sullivan in the semi-finals. He made a 139 break during the match, but lost it 3–6. A second major event semi-final soon followed at the World Grand Prix as he conceded just two frames in eliminating Barry Hawkins (Perry's 133 won him the high-break prize), Kyren Wilson and Ali Carter. Stuart Bingham was never ahead of Perry until the frame as he squandered a 3–0 lead to be defeated 5–6. In an extremely tight World Championship first-round match, he was edged out 9–10 by Wilson.

A 6–2 success over Neil Robertson saw Perry advance to the final of the 2016 World Open, where he lost 8–10 to Ali Carter. He also saw off Robertson 6–2 to reach the quarter-finals of the International Championship and was defeated 3–6 by Mark Selby. Perry was knocked out 2–6 by Matthew Stevens in the third round of the UK Championship.

At the 2017 Masters a pair of 6–1 victories over Stuart Bingham and Ding Junhui saw Perry play in the semi-finals of the event for the first time. He was 2–5 behind Barry Hawkins and needed a snooker in the next frame, but managed to get it and take the frame. The tie went to a deciding frame in which Perry was 50 points down, but he stepped in to make a break of 70 and reach the final of a Triple Crown tournament for the first time. He said his plan for the final was to get in front of Ronnie O'Sullivan and stay in front of him and he started well by leading 4–1. However, O'Sullivan then reeled off a match defining seven frames in a row and went on to win 10–7. Afterwards, Perry said he had failed to handle the pressure of having a lead in such a big match. He lost 3–4 in the quarter-finals of the World Grand Prix to Liang Wenbo and could not qualify for the World Championship as, after coming back from 6–9 down, he was defeated 9–10 by Akani Songsermsawad. At the 2018 World Championship, he defeated defending champion Mark Selby 10–4 in the first round.

Perry claimed his second ranking title at the 2022 Welsh Open by defeating Judd Trump 9–5 in the final. He called winning the tournament "the absolute highlight of my career by a country mile." Aged 47, he became the second-oldest player to win a ranking title, after Ray Reardon, who was aged 50 when he won his final ranking event in 1982.

=== Retirement ===
In April 2025, Perry announced that he would retire from professional snooker after the 2025 World Championship.

=== Seniors snooker ===
Perry defeated Stuart Bingham and Matthew Stevens to reach the final of the 2025 British Seniors Open, where he defeated Jimmy White 7–5 to win his first title on the World Seniors Tour. At the 2026 World Seniors Championship, Perry reached the final but lost 4–10 to Ronnie O'Sullivan.

== Personal life ==
Perry was born in Wisbech, Cambridgeshire, on 13 August 1974, the son of Peter and Judy Perry. His father worked as a taxi driver. When he was 14, his family moved to Chatteris, where he has lived since. In 2005, he married Joanne at Kimbolton Castle; the first of their two daughters was born the following year. Perry suffers from ankylosing spondylitis. During the 2012–13 season, before his condition was correctly diagnosed, he considered giving up his professional snooker career. He stated: "I was thinking about packing it in because I couldn’t take it anymore. I felt there was no point me flying overseas then not being able to even practice, and losing matches."

Perry and his wife subsequently separated, and his current partner is Penny Richardson. In March 2024, Perry and Richardson opened a snooker and pool hall in the Market Hill area of Chatteris, in a building formerly occupied by a Turkish restaurant. Perry stated that he had "always wanted to do something for Chatteris" as his and Richardson's children had grown up in the town. He said he hoped the club would "produce another Joe Perry". Professional player Neil Robertson practices at the club and Perry's personal match table is available to club members.

Perry is a supporter of Arsenal F.C.

== Performance and rankings timeline ==
Tournament	1992/ 93	1993/ 94	1994/ 95	1995/ 96	1996/ 97	1997/ 98	1998/ 99	1999/ 00	2000/ 01	2001/ 02	2002/ 03	2003/ 04	2004/ 05	2005/ 06	2006/ 07	2007/ 08	2008/ 09	2009/ 10	2010/ 11	2011/ 12	2012/ 13	2013/ 14	2014/ 15	2015/ 16	2016/ 17	2017/ 18	2018/ 19	2019/ 20		2020/ 21	2021/ 22	2022/ 23	2023/ 24	2024/ 25
Ranking	(Note: New players on the Main Tour don't have a ranking)	327	265	195	166	123	74	34	31	27	13	16	20	14	18	18	12	12	19	27	24	20	15	9	11	22	20	19		16	20	26	26	47
Ranking tournaments
Championship League	Tournament Not Held															Non-Ranking Event														3R	RR	RR	2R	RR
Xi'an Grand Prix	Tournament Not Held																																	1R
Saudi Arabia Masters	Tournament Not Held																																	3R
English Open	Tournament Not Held																								1R	1R	1R	3R		2R	LQ	LQ	LQ	1R
British Open	LQ	LQ	LQ	LQ	1R	1R	1R	LQ	3R	3R	2R	3R	1R	Tournament Not Held																	1R	1R	LQ	LQ
Wuhan Open	Tournament Not Held																																LQ	LQ
Northern Ireland Open	Tournament Not Held																								3R	4R	1R	SF		2R	LQ	1R	3R	LQ
International Championship	Tournament Not Held																				LQ	SF	2R	QF	QF	2R	2R	3R		Not Held			LQ	1R
UK Championship	LQ	LQ	1R	LQ	LQ	LQ	1R	1R	2R	2R	2R	3R	SF	SF	QF	2R	QF	1R	LQ	LQ	LQ	4R	3R	2R	3R	QF	QF	3R		QF	2R	QF	LQ	LQ
Shoot Out	Tournament Not Held																		Non-Ranking Event						1R	QF	1R	4R		3R	1R	3R	1R	1R
Scottish Open (Note: The event was called the International Open (1992/1993–1996/1997) and the Players Championship (2003/2004))	LQ	LQ	LQ	LQ	LQ	2R	LQ	1R	1R	3R	2R	3R	Tournament Not Held								MR	Not Held			3R	2R	3R	4R		1R	1R	2R	LQ	LQ
German Masters (Note: The event was called the German Open (1995/1996–1997/1998))	Not Held			LQ	LQ	LQ	NR	Tournament Not Held											QF	2R	1R	QF	2R	LQ	LQ	2R	2R	1R		2R	LQ	1R	2R	LQ
Welsh Open	LQ	LQ	LQ	LQ	LQ	2R	LQ	1R	2R	2R	2R	3R	2R	2R	2R	QF	1R	1R	1R	LQ	2R	SF	3R	SF	1R	1R	3R	1R		3R	W	2R	LQ	LQ
World Open (Note: The event was called the Grand Prix (1992/1993–2000/2001 and 2004/2005–2009/2010) and the LG Cup (2001/2002–2003/2004))	LQ	LQ	LQ	LQ	LQ	LQ	LQ	1R	2R	1R	2R	2R	QF	1R	QF	QF	2R	QF	LQ	2R	LQ	1R	Not Held		F	3R	3R	3R		Not Held			2R	1R
World Grand Prix	Tournament Not Held																						NR	SF	QF	2R	1R	QF		1R	DNQ	1R	DNQ	DNQ
Players Championship (Note: The event was called the Players Tour Championship Grand Final (2010/2011–2015/2016))	Tournament Not Held																		DNQ	QF	2R	QF	W	DNQ	DNQ	DNQ	1R	QF		DNQ	DNQ	DNQ	DNQ	DNQ
Tour Championship	Tournament Not Held																										DNQ	DNQ		DNQ	DNQ	DNQ	DNQ	DNQ
World Championship	A	LQ	LQ	LQ	LQ	LQ	2R	LQ	LQ	2R	1R	QF	LQ	1R	1R	SF	1R	2R	1R	2R	LQ	2R	2R	1R	LQ	2R	1R	LQ		LQ	LQ	1R	LQ	LQ
Non-ranking tournaments
Champion of Champions	Tournament Not Held																					A	A	SF	1R	A	A	A		A	A	1R	A	A
The Masters	A	A	A	A	LQ	LQ	LQ	LQ	LQ	LQ	1R	WR	A	WR	LQ	LQ	1R	1R	A	A	A	1R	QF	1R	F	A	A	QF		1R	A	A	A	A
Championship League	Tournament Not Held															W	SF	RR	A	RR	RR	2R	A	RR	RR	RR	RR	RR	RR	RR	RR	RR	RR	A
Former ranking tournaments
Asian Classic (Note: The event was called the Dubai Classic (1992/1993–1994/1995) and the Thailand Classic (1995/1996))	LQ	LQ	LQ	LQ	LQ	Tournament Not Held																												
Malta Grand Prix	Not Held		Non-Ranking Event					LQ	NR	Tournament Not Held																								
Thailand Masters (Note: The event was called the Asian Open (1992/1993) and the Thailand Open (1993/1994–1996/1997))	LQ	LQ	LQ	LQ	LQ	LQ	LQ	2R	1R	1R	NR	Not Held			NR	Tournament Not Held																		
Irish Masters	Non-Ranking Event										2R	1R	LQ	NH	NR	Tournament Not Held																		
Northern Ireland Trophy	Tournament Not Held													NR	1R	2R	3R	Tournament Not Held																
Bahrain Championship	Tournament Not Held																2R	Tournament Not Held																
Wuxi Classic (Note: The event was called the Jiangsu Classic (2008/2009–2009/2010))	Tournament Not Held																Non-Ranking Event				2R	QF	F	Tournament Not Held										
Australian Goldfields Open (Note: The event was called the Australian Open (1994/1995–1995/1996) and the Australian Masters (1995/1996))	Not Held		Non-Ranking		Tournament Not Held															1R	1R	QF	1R	QF	Tournament Not Held									
Shanghai Masters	Tournament Not Held															LQ	2R	1R	LQ	LQ	QF	WR	1R	1R	1R	2R	Non-Ranking			Not Held			Non-Ranking	
Paul Hunter Classic (Note: The event was called the Grand Prix Fürth (2004/2005) and the Fürth German Open (2005/2006–2006/2007))	Tournament Not Held												Pro-am Event						Minor-Ranking Event						1R	A	A	NR		Tournament Not Held				
Indian Open	Tournament Not Held																					3R	QF	NH	A	2R	2R	Tournament Not Held						
China Open (Note: The event was called the China International (1997/1998–1998/1999))	Tournament Not Held					NR	LQ	QF	LQ	2R	Not Held		LQ	QF	LQ	1R	1R	2R	1R	1R	LQ	LQ	1R	1R	1R	2R	1R	Tournament Not Held						
Riga Masters (Note: The event was called the Riga Open (2014/2015–2015/2016))	Tournament Not Held																						Minor-Rank		1R	QF	3R	2R		Tournament Not Held				
China Championship	Tournament Not Held																								NR	1R	2R	QF		Tournament Not Held				
WST Pro Series	Tournament Not Held																													2R	Tournament Not Held			
Turkish Masters	Tournament Not Held																														1R	Not Held		
Gibraltar Open	Tournament Not Held																							MR	3R	QF	1R	3R		3R	2R	Not Held		
WST Classic	Tournament Not Held																															2R	Not Held	
European Masters (Note: The event was called the European Open (1992/1993–1996/1997 and 2001/2002–2003/2004), the Irish Open (1998/1999) and the Malta Cup (2004/2005–2007/2008))	LQ	LQ	LQ	LQ	LQ	NH	1R	Not Held		F	1R	2R	LQ	2R	LQ	NR	Tournament Not Held								LQ	2R	F	LQ		1R	2R	LQ	1R	NH
Former non-ranking tournaments
Scottish Masters	A	A	A	A	A	A	A	A	A	LQ	LQ	Tournament Not Held																						
Northern Ireland Trophy	Tournament Not Held													WR	Ranking Event			Tournament Not Held																
Malta Cup	Ranking Event					Tournament Not Held				Ranking Event					RR	Tournament Not Held								Ranking Event										
Wuxi Classic	Tournament Not Held																SF	RR	QF	A	Ranking Event			Tournament Not Held										
Premier League (Note: The event was called the European League (1992/1993–1996/1997))	A	A	A	A	A	A	A	A	A	A	A	A	A	A	A	A	SF	A	A	A	A	Tournament Not Held												
World Grand Prix	Tournament Not Held																						2R	Ranking Event										
General Cup (Note: The event was called the General Cup International (2004/2005–2011/2012))	Tournament Not Held												A	Tournament Not Held				A	NH	A	A	RR	SF	RR	Tournament Not Held									
Shoot Out	Tournament Not Held																		2R	1R	1R	1R	3R	3R	Ranking Event									
China Championship	Tournament Not Held																								1R	Ranking Event				Tournament Not Held				
Macau Masters	Tournament Not Held																										RR	Tournament Not Held						
Paul Hunter Classic	Tournament Not Held												Pro-am Event						Minor-Ranking Event						Ranking Event			SF		Tournament Not Held				
Six-red World Championship (Note: The event was called the Six-red Snooker International (2008/2009) and the Six-red World Grand Prix (2009/2010))	Tournament Not Held																A	2R	QF	NH	3R	QF	3R	QF	3R	A	RR	2R		Not Held		2R	Not Held	
Haining Open	Tournament Not Held																						Minor-Rank		A	A	4R	A		NH	A	NH	A	NH

Performance Table Legend
LQ	lost in the qualifying draw	#R	lost in the early rounds of the tournament (WR = Wildcard round, RR = Round robin)	QF	lost in the quarter-finals
SF	lost in the semi-finals	F	lost in the final	W	won the tournament
DNQ	did not qualify for the tournament	A	did not participate in the tournament	WD	withdrew from the tournament
DQ	disqualified from the tournament				

NH / Not Held	event was not held.
NR / Non-Ranking Event	event is/was no longer a ranking event.
R / Ranking Event	event is/was a ranking event.
MR / Minor-Ranking Event	means an event is/was a minor-ranking event.
PA / Pro-am Event	means an event is/was a pro-am event.

== Career finals ==
=== Ranking finals: 6 (2 titles) ===
Outcome	No.	Year	Championship	Opponent in the final	Score
Runner-up	1.	2001	European Open	(Scotland) Stephen Hendry	2–9
Runner-up	2.	2014	Wuxi Classic	(Australia) Neil Robertson	9–10
Winner	1.	2015	Players Tour Championship Finals	(Wales) Mark Williams	4–3
Runner-up	3.	2016	World Open	(England) Ali Carter	8–10
Runner-up	4.	2018	European Masters	(England) Jimmy Robertson	6–9
Winner	2.	2022	Welsh Open	(England) Judd Trump	9–5

=== Minor-ranking finals: 4 (2 titles) ===
Outcome	No.	Year	Championship	Opponent in the final	Score
Runner-up	1.	2011	Players Tour Championship – Event 1	(England) Ronnie O'Sullivan	0–4
Runner-up	2.	2012	FFB Snooker Open	(Scotland) Stephen Maguire	2–4
Winner	1.	2013	Yixing Open	(England) Mark Selby	4–1
Winner	2.	2015	Xuzhou Open	(Thailand) Thepchaiya Un-Nooh	4–1

=== Non-ranking finals: 3 (2 titles) ===
Legend
The Masters (0–1)
Other (2–0)

Outcome	No.	Year	Championship	Opponent in the final	Score
Winner	1.	2004	Merseyside Professional Championship	(England) Stephen Croft	5–2
Winner	2.	2008	Championship League	(England) Mark Selby	3–1
Runner-up	1.	2017	The Masters	(England) Ronnie O'Sullivan	7–10

=== Seniors finals: 2 (1 title) ===
Outcome	No.	Year	Championship	Opponent in the final	Score
Winner	1.	2025	British Seniors Open	(England) Jimmy White	7–5
Runner-up	1.	2026	World Seniors Championship	(England) Ronnie O'Sullivan	4–10

=== Pro-am finals: 5 (4 titles) ===
Outcome	No.	Year	Championship	Opponent in the final	Score
Winner	1.	2007	Pontins Pro-Am - Event 3	(England) Stuart Bingham	4–0
Runner-up	1.	2007	German Open	(England) Mark Davis	3–4
Winner	2.	2007	Pontins World Series Grand Final	(England) Ricky Walden	4–2
Winner	3.	2008	Pontins Pro-Am - Event 4	(England) Stuart Bingham	4–3
Winner	4.	2013	Pink Ribbon	(England) Barry Hawkins	4–3

=== Team finals: 8 (5 titles) ===
Outcome	No.	Year	Championship	Team/partner	Opponent(s) in the final	Score
Winner	1.	2007	World Mixed Doubles Championship	(England) Leah Willett	(England) Gary Wilson (England) Pam Wood	3–1
Runner-up	1.	2008	World Mixed Doubles Championship	(England) Leah Willett	(Australia) Neil Robertson (England) Reanne Evans	1–3
Runner-up	2.	2009	World Mixed Doubles Championship (2)	(England) Leah Willett	(England) Michael Holt (England) Reanne Evans	2–3
Winner	2.	2010	World Mixed Doubles Championship (2)	(Latvia) Tatjana Vasiljeva	(England) Martin Gould (England) Pam Wood	3–2
Winner	3.	2011	World Mixed Doubles Championship (3)	(Latvia) Tatjana Vasiljeva	(England) Martin Gould (England) Pam Wood	3–2
Winner	4.	2012	World Mixed Doubles Championship (4)	(Latvia) Tatjana Vasiljeva	(England) Nigel Ward (England) Emma Bonney	3–1
Winner	5.	2017	CVB Snooker Challenge	Great Britain	China	26–9
Runner-up	3.	2018	Macau Masters	(Wales) Mark Williams (Hong Kong) Marco Fu (China) Zhang Anda	(England) Barry Hawkins (Wales) Ryan Day (China) Zhao Xintong (China) Zhou Yuelong	1–5
