= Mark Allen (snooker player) =

Northern Irish snooker player (born 1986)

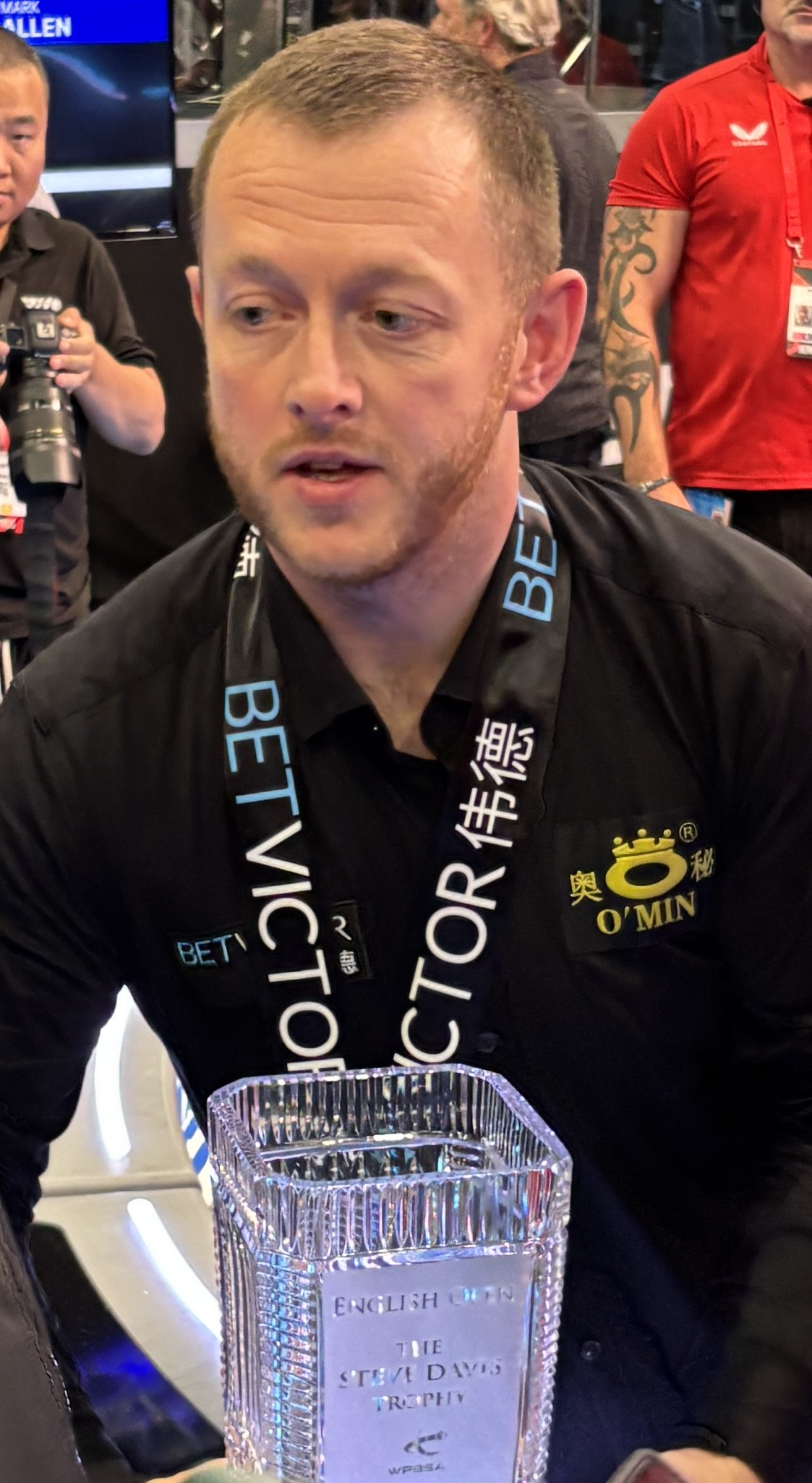
- Allen at the 2025 English Open

Personal information
- Nickname: The Pistol
- Born: 22 February 1986 (age 40) Antrim, County Antrim, Northern Ireland

Sport
- Country: Northern Ireland
- Sport: Snooker
- Professional: 2005–present
- Highest ranking: 1 (May 2024–August 2024)
- Current ranking: 11 (as of 7 November 2026)
- Maximum breaks: 5
- Century breaks: 704 (as of 19 November 2026)

Tournament wins
- Ranking: 12
- Minor-ranking: 5

Mark Allen (born 22 February 1986) is a Northern Irish professional snooker player from Antrim. As an amateur, he won the European Championship and World Amateur Championship in 2004. He turned professional in 2005 and entered the top 16 in the snooker world rankings after only three seasons on the tour. He won his first ranking title at the 2012 World Open, defeating Stephen Lee 10–1 in the final, and has since won 12 ranking titles.

Allen has won two Triple Crown titles, having defeated Kyren Wilson 10–7 to win the 2018 Masters and Ding Junhui by the same score to win the 2022 UK Championship. His best performances at the World Snooker Championship have been semi-final finishes in 2009, 2023, and 2026. While playing Wu Yize in the 2026 semi-finals, he missed a match-ball black off its spot in the penultimate frame and went on to lose the match 16–17.

The 2022–23 season was the best of Allen's career to date as he reached four ranking finals, won three ranking titles and reached number three in the world rankings. He was ranked world number one from May to August 2024. He has compiled over 700 century breaks in professional competition, including five maximum breaks. He is the only player to have made maximum breaks in all three Triple Crown tournaments.

== Career ==
=== Early career ===
At a young age, Allen considered a career in football, having trials with Sheffield Wednesday and Nottingham Forest before concentrating on snooker. Playing out of the Fountain Club in Antrim, he was Northern Ireland U14 champion in 2000, the U16 champion in 2001, before winning the Irish U16, U18 and U19 titles in one weekend in 2002, becoming the first player to win all three tournaments. By the age of 16 he had recorded his first maximum break and was a winner of the Golden Waistcoat, a tournament for the best U19 players from around the world.

He began his professional career by playing on the Challenge Tour in 2003, at the time the second-level professional tour. Before entering the Main Tour for the 2005–06 season, Allen won the European Championship and the IBSF World Championship, plus the Northern Ireland Championship at under-14, under-16, and under-19 levels. His early career was aided by National Lottery funding.

By chance, an invitational Northern Ireland Trophy was staged shortly after Allen turned professional. As a local player, he was invited and made an immediate impact, defeating Steve Davis and John Higgins to reach the quarter-finals, before losing to Stephen Hendry. In his first year on the tour, he reached the last 32 of the 2005 UK Championship and the 2006 Welsh Open, losing 2–5 to the then World Champion Shaun Murphy after leading 2–0. He also got to the final qualifying round of the 2006 World Championship, losing 7–10 to Andy Hicks, after leading 7–4.

In March 2007 he qualified for the World Championship for the first time, winning three matches, culminating in a 10–4 win over Robert Milkins. In April 2007 he beat former world champion Ken Doherty 10–7 in the first round held at the Crucible Theatre in Sheffield, but lost to Matthew Stevens 9–13 in the second round. This was his first run to the last 16 of a tournament and helped him into the top 32 of the rankings (at no. 29).

In the 2007 Grand Prix, in a match with Ken Doherty, he was involved in an incident that led to his opponent branding him "a disgrace". Unhappy that the black would not go back on its spot after potting it, Allen struck the side cushion of the table with his fist. The referee told him that he would be warned if he did that again. Allen was not warned, and ended up winning the match. Doherty said, "He was a disgrace. For such a relative newcomer to the pro game, he's got a serious attitude problem". Allen later commented: "It was entirely my own fault and if there are going to be any repercussions then so be it." Allen did not reach the knockout stage of the tournament.

In the 2007 Northern Ireland Trophy he beat Graeme Dott and Ryan Day, 5–3 in each case, to reach his first ever quarter-final. There he defeated Gerard Greene 5–3 to reach the semi-final, where he lost 3–6 to Fergal O'Brien. In the following UK Championship he defeated Stephen Hendry in the last 32. He opened his last-16 match against Mark Williams with two centuries in the first three frames, building a 5–1 lead, but Williams fought back and he lost 5–9. He then reached the quarter-finals in the 2008 China Open before losing to Shaun Murphy. At the 2008 World Championship he led Stephen Hendry 6–3, 7–4 and 9–7 before losing 9–10. However, first-round defeats for all his rivals for a top-16 place ensured that he finished the season at number 16 in the rankings.

=== 2009–2011 seasons ===
At the 2009 World Championship, Allen beat Martin Gould in his opening match. He then faced Ronnie O'Sullivan in the second round, and Allen defeated the defending champion 13–11 to progress to the quarter-finals. He then defeated Day by the same scoreline to reach the semi-finals, where he lost 13–17 to John Higgins, despite making a fightback from 3–13 down. Allen won his first professional tournament, the 2009 Jiangsu Classic, by beating home favourite Ding Junhui 6–0 in the final.

During the 2010 Masters, Allen beat the World Champion, John Higgins, 6–3 in the last 16, but lost 5–6 to Selby in the quarter-finals.

On the first day of the 2010 World Championship, Allen came close to recording his first ever maximum break in his first round match against Tom Ford after potting 15 reds with blacks, and the yellow, before breaking down on the green. Five days later, Allen made the first 146 break in World Championship history, and the second of his career after defeating Mark Davis 13–5 in the second round. He was defeated 12–13 in the quarter-finals by Dott, having led 12–10.

At the 2010 UK Championship, Allen reached the semi-finals for the first time, where he was beaten 5–9 by eventual champion John Higgins. In the Masters, Allen again reached the semi-finals, and led Marco Fu 4–1 before Fu reeled off five frames in a row to win 6–4. At the 2011 World Championship, Allen entered as the 11th seed and played Matthew Stevens in the first round, recovering from 9–6 down and seeing Stevens miss a pot on the final pink to win the match 10–7, before winning 10–9. In the second round, Allen defeated Barry Hawkins 13–12. He reached the quarter-finals for the second year in a row but lost to Mark Williams 5–13.

=== 2011/2012 season ===
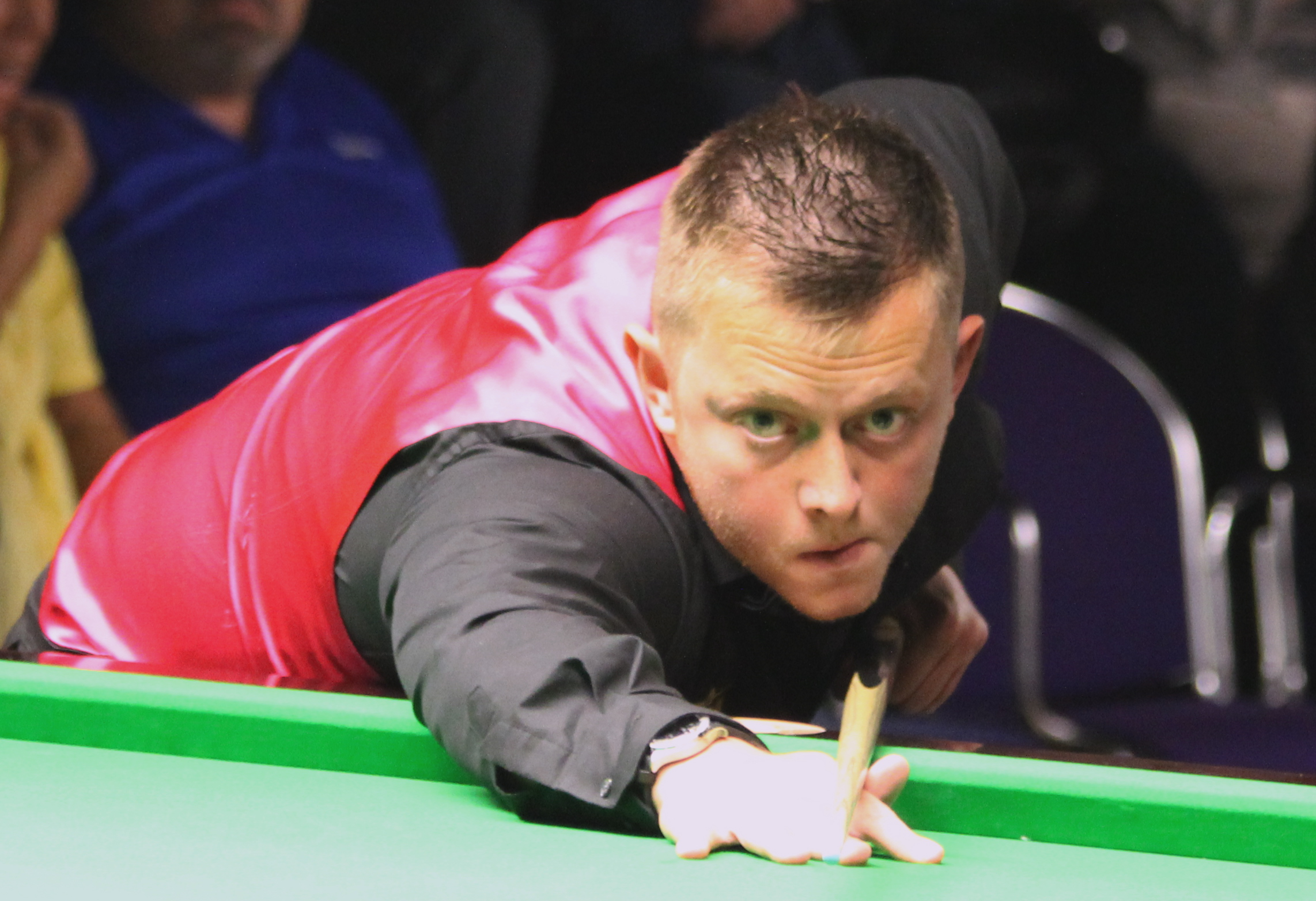
2012 Paul Hunter Classic

The season began with Allen ranked world number 12 and he began it at the inaugural Australian Goldfields Open, where he beat Day and Marcus Campbell. Into the quarter finals, Allen was beaten by his rival Stuart Bingham 5–3. The next ranking event was the Shanghai Masters where Allen reached the second round and held a 4–2 advantage over Shaun Murphy before losing the next 3 frames and being edged out of the match 5–4. His steady start to the season meant that he maintained his world ranking of 12 after the first cut-off point.

Allen made it to his first ranking event final at the 2011 UK Championship by beating Adrian Gunnell, Ali Carter, Marco Fu and Ricky Walden. It was his first success in a ranking event semi-final, after having lost in all five prior attempts. In the final he played Judd Trump with whom he held a 2–1 advantage in the previous meetings between the pair. Allen opened up a 3–1 lead early in the best of 19 frames match, but subsequently lost the next seven frames to trail 3–8. However, such a deficit brought out the best in Allen as he won five of the next six frames, which included three centuries. The comeback was not quite completed though, as Trump secured the frame he required to take an 8–10 victory. Allen said after the final, "I knew it was going to be hard the way he was playing, he scores so heavy and so quickly and I didn't feel I was playing too bad but Judd played so well and it was hard to compete." Allen made five centuries during the tournament, the most of anyone in the event.

Allen lost the last four frames in the first round of the Masters to Neil Robertson having led 3–2 and stated afterwards that he had "completely lost interest" in the match. He accused the Australian of employing slow tactics and said that at times he didn't want to watch him play. He then exited the German Masters in the second round and lost to Shaun Murphy in the quarter-finals of the Welsh Open.

In March, Allen won his first ever ranking event as he captured the World Open title in Haikou, China. He beat qualifier Jimmy Robertson in the first round, before exacting revenge over Judd Trump for his defeat in York, by coming back from 0–3 down to triumph 5–4. He comfortably beat Mark King 5–1 in the quarter-finals, before producing another comeback from 2–5 down against world number 1 Mark Selby to win 6–5 and reach his second ranking final of the season. Allen played Stephen Lee in the final and dominated the encounter from start to finish as he won by 10 frames to 1. His season finished in disappointment, however, as he exited both the China Open and World Championship in the first round, to end the year where he started it, ranked world number 12.

=== 2012/2013 season ===
Allen began the season with second round losses to Williams at the Wuxi Classic and Trump in the Shanghai Masters. He claimed his first title of the year at the minor-ranking Antwerp Open, making three centuries in a 4–1 win over Selby in the final. Allen then beat Milkins and Cao Yupeng in the inaugural International Championship, before being edged out 5–6 by Trump in the quarter-finals. At the UK Championship, Allen lost to Fu 3–6. At the Masters Allen came past Mark Davis, but was then narrowly beaten 5–6 by Neil Robertson in the quarter-finals. At the Snooker Shoot-Out, Allen won through to the final where he lost to Gould. He suffered successive second round defeats at the German Masters and the Welsh Open to Hawkins and Ding respectively, before he travelled to China in an attempt to defend his World Open title from 2012. Allen beat Day, Milkins, Walden, John Higgins and Stevens 10–4 in the final to capture his second ranking title. Allen's Antwerp Open win from earlier in the season helped him finish eighth on the Players Tour Championship Order of Merit to qualify for the Finals where he lost 3–4 in the quarter-finals to Ding. Robertson beat Allen 5–1 in the second round of the China Open, and then Allen was the victim of a first round shock at the World Championship for a second year in a row as he lost to world number 30 Mark King 8–10, having led 8–6. Despite this, he climbed five spots in the rankings during the year to finish it ranked world number seven.

=== 2013/2014 season ===
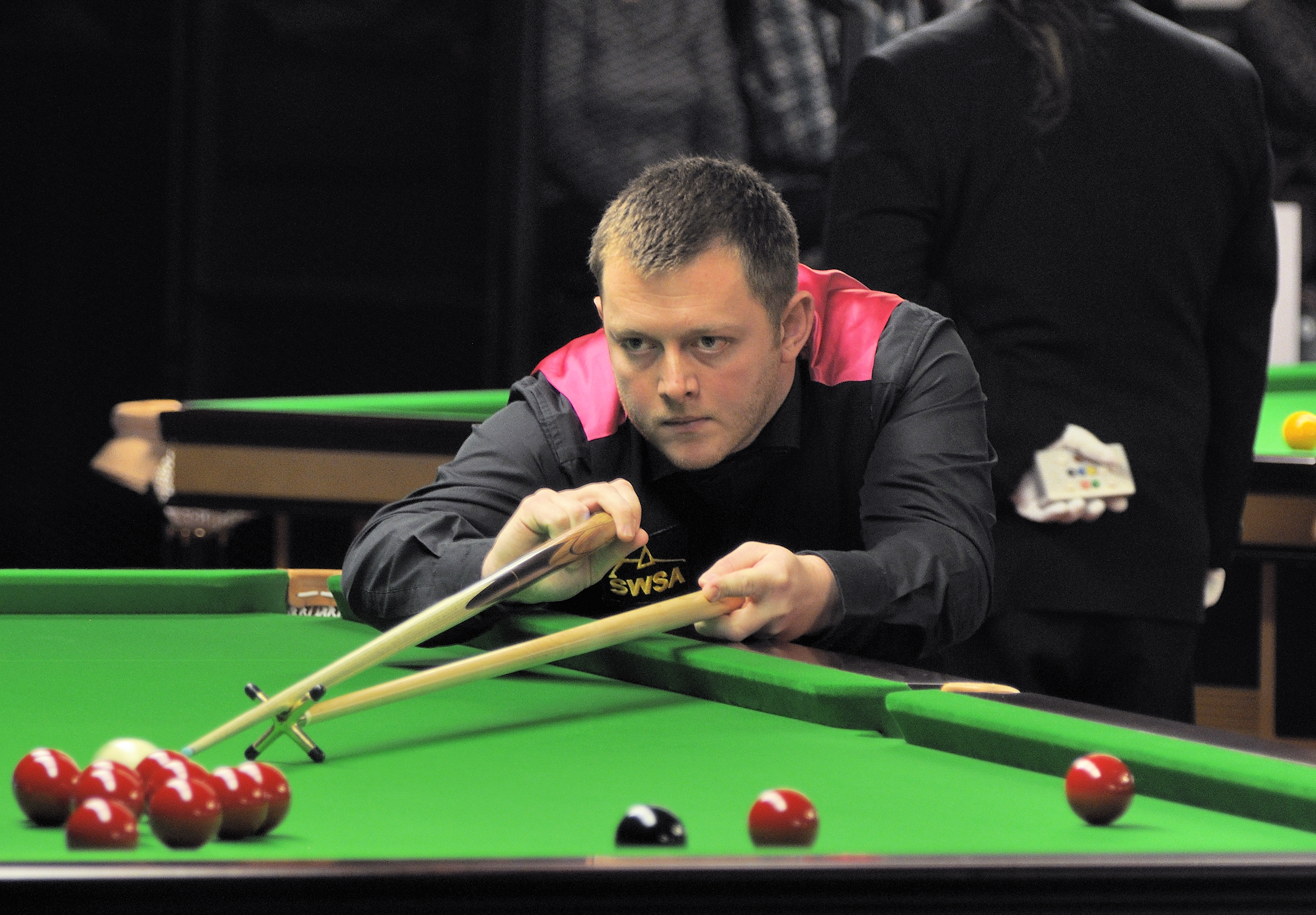
2014 German Masters

After losing in the first round of the opening two ranking events of the year, Allen won the minor-ranking Ruhr Open in Mülheim by beating Ding 4–1 in the final. He also won the next European Tour event, the Kay Suzanne Memorial Cup. Allen eliminated Robertson and Dott in the quarter-finals and semi-finals respectively, before beating Trump 4–1 in the final to become the first player to win back-to-back events since they were introduced in 2010. In the last 16 of the UK Championship, Allen overcame Trump to reach his first major quarter-final of the season, where he lost 2–6 to Walden. Allen came close to recording a hat-trick of World Open titles as he won through to the semi-finals, but was beaten 4–6 by Murphy. His two titles earlier in the season meant Allen was the number one seed for the PTC Finals where he lost in the quarter-finals 2–4 against Greene. Allen was 7–9 behind against Robertson after the second session of his last 16 match at the World Championship and lost all four frames in the next session to be defeated 13–7. Afterwards, Allen tipped Robertson for the title saying he had faced perfect snooker from the Australian.

=== 2014/2015 season ===
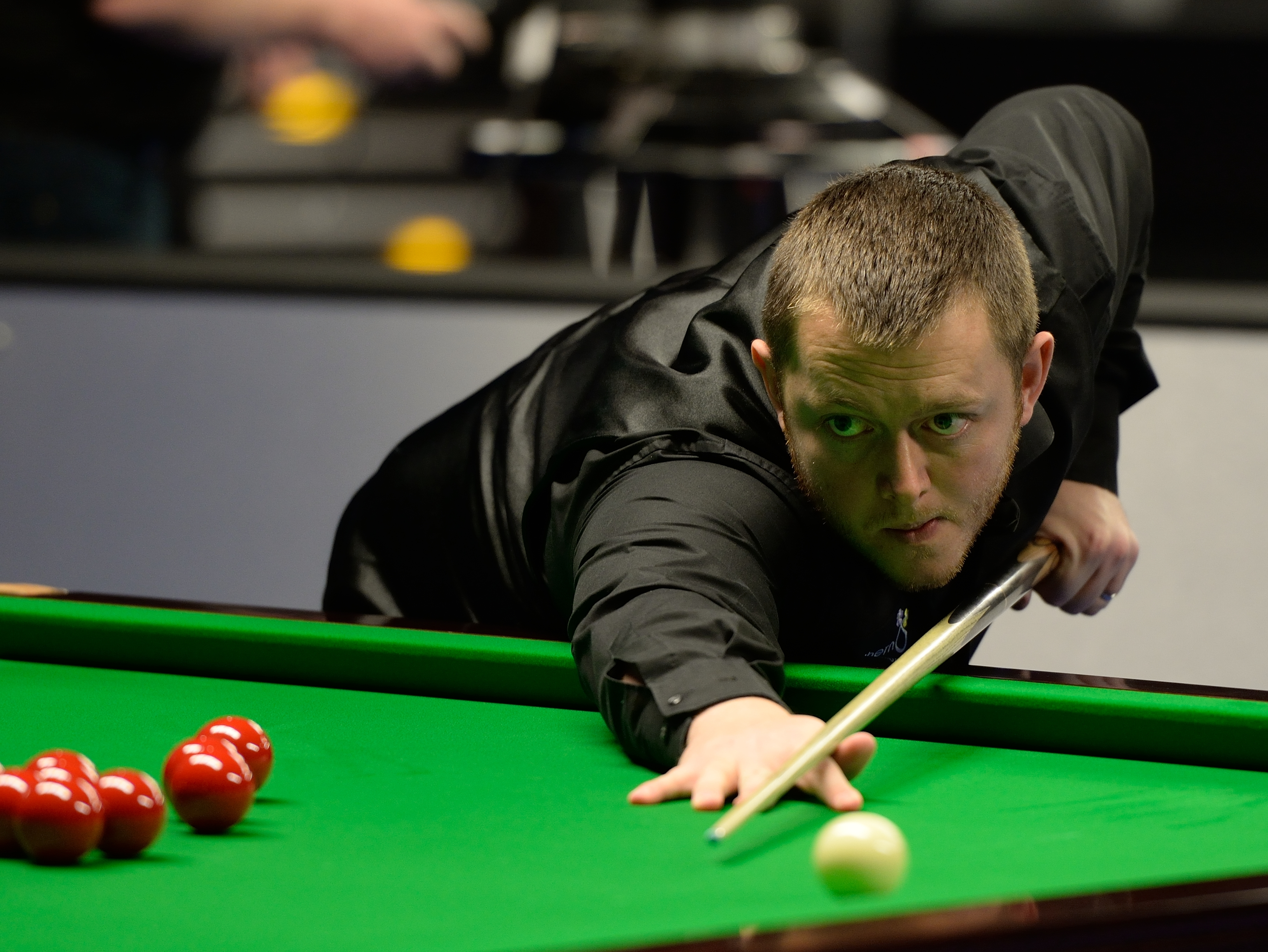
2015 German Masters

In August 2014, he reached the final of the Riga Open but lost 3–4 to Selby. Two weeks later Allen won the Paul Hunter Classic defeating Trump 4–2 in the final. He advanced to the final of the Shanghai Masters where he was beaten 3–10 by Bingham. At the International Championship, Allen overcame Williams to reach the final, where he suffered a defeat to Walden, condemning Allen to a second ranking event final defeat of the season. Despite taking a 3–0 lead over Rod Lawler with two centuries, Allen was knocked out 4–6 in the third round of the UK Championship.

Allen eliminated John Higgins and Joe Perry to play in the semi-finals of the Masters for the second time. Allen won the opening two frames against Murphy, but then lost six frames in a row to exit the tournament. The rest of the season would prove to be disappointing for Allen as he couldn't advance beyond the last 16 of any event and after he lost the last five frames against Barry Hawkins in the second round of the World Championship to be beaten 11–13, he stated that the match had summed up his year as he was great in patches but overall came up short. He had not been coached by Terry Griffiths this season and Allen said that he was hopeful his form would improve next year by working with him again.

=== 2015/2016 season ===
Allen reached the semi-finals of the Shanghai Masters, where he was beaten 1–6 by Kyren Wilson. In the quarter-finals of the International Championship, he suffered a deciding frame defeat to Thepchaiya Un-Nooh. Allen progressed to the final of the Bulgarian Open by whitewashing Williams 4–0 and did not drop a frame against Day either as he took home the title, his first in fifteen months. The win qualified Allen for the Champion of Champions and he knocked out Hawkins, Stephen Maguire and Kyren Wilson to reach the final, where he lost 5–10 to Robertson. Robertson was also the victor when the pair met in the semi-finals of the Welsh Open.

Allen came from 2–4 down against Murphy to win 6–4 and reach his first ranking event final of the season at the PTC Finals. In the final he trailed 1–3 to Walden, but a run of six successive frames would be key as Allen won 10–6. He became the first Northern Irishman to win a ranking event in the UK since Dennis Taylor won the world title in 1985. Allen lost the opening seven frames against Kyren Wilson in the second round of the World Championship. He closed the gap to 9–11, but had left himself too much to do as he lost 9–13. Allen called the season a waste as he had not become the world champion.

=== 2016/2017 season ===
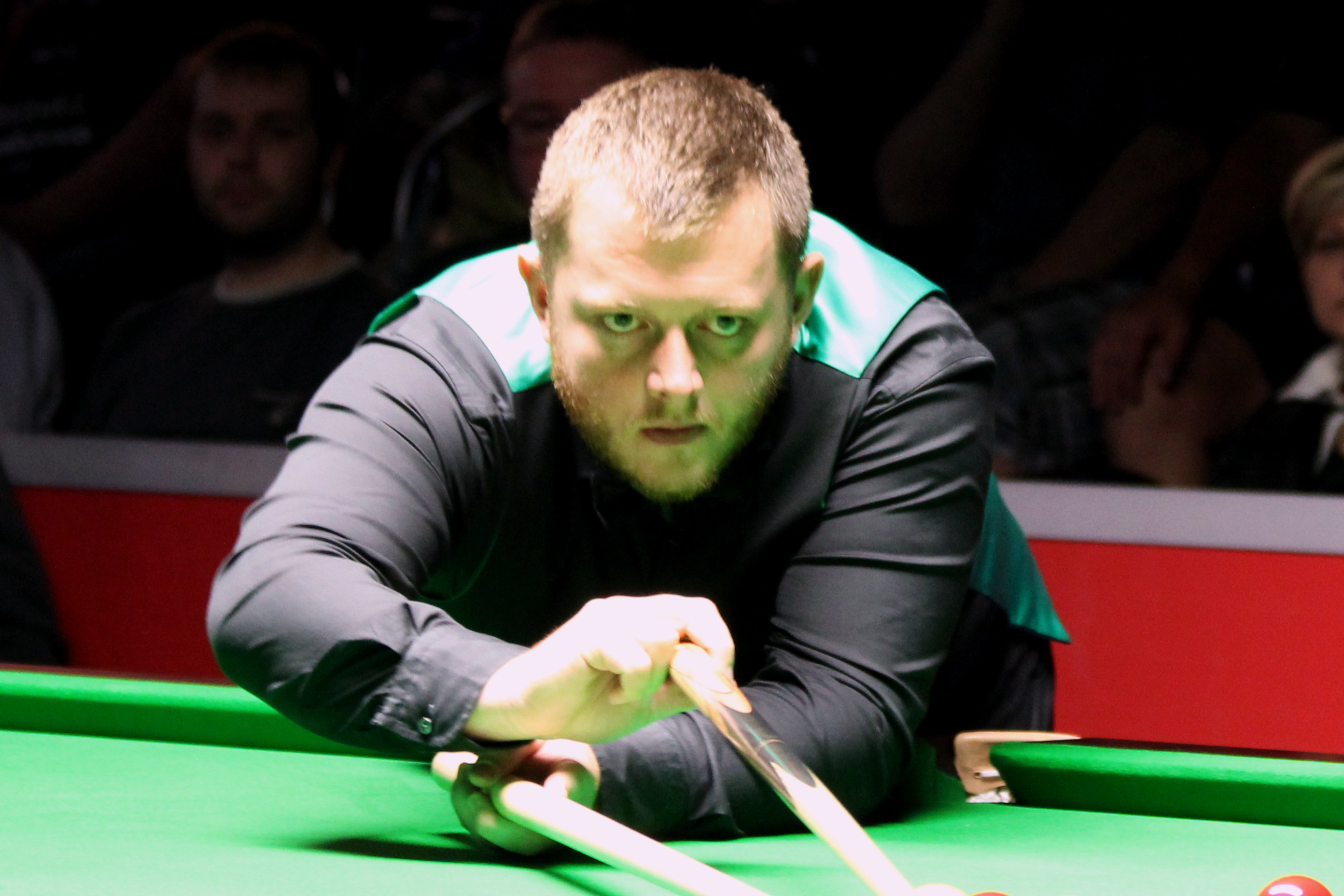
2016 Paul Hunter Classic

Allen lost in the last 16 of the Paul Hunter Classic and the European Masters 3–4 to Un-Nooh and 2–4 to O'Sullivan respectively. He made three centuries to eliminate Selby 6–5 at the inaugural China Championship, but was then heavily beaten 3–9 by John Higgins. A week later, he defeated Selby by the same scoreline and stage at the Champion of Champions, before losing 2–6 to O'Sullivan.

Allen's only ranking event quarter-final of the season came at his home event the Northern Ireland Open, but he lost 2–5 to Anthony Hamilton. He made the first 147 of his career during his 6–4 win over Lawler in the second round of the UK Championship and then recovered from 0–4 down to eliminate Day 6–5. Allen was knocked out 3–6 by John Higgins in the fourth round, losing the final four frames of the match. He exacted some revenge by edging out Higgins 6–5 in the opening round of the Masters, before being defeated 2–6 by Fu. He met Higgins again in the second round of the World Championship and, though Allen made four centuries and seven other breaks above 50, he was beaten 13–9.

=== 2017/2018 season ===
Allen reached the final of the International Championship but lost to Selby 7-10. Later he progressed to the semi-finals in the World Open, where he was eliminated by Kyren Wilson 5–6, and the quarter-finals of the European Masters, losing 3–4 to Trump. However, Allen triumphed in the 2018 Masters beating Brecel, O'Sullivan and Higgins, before overcoming Kyren Wilson 10-7 in the final. Allen became the first player from Northern Ireland to win the trophy since 1987 when Dennis Taylor was victorious. Victory also marked Allen's first ever victory in a triple crown event. Speaking about his success afterwards, Allen said "It's been a long time coming, I was never sure it was going to come... And now that I've done it, hopefully this is the stepping stone to bigger and better things." In the 2018 World Championship, Allen exited in the quarter-finals, suffering a 6-13 defeat against Kyren Wilson.

=== 2018/2019 season ===
Allen reached the final of the International Championship, where he triumphed over Robertson 10-5. Allen reached the 2018 UK Championship final after he won a deciding frame in his semi-final clash against Bingham. His opponent was the defending champion O'Sullivan, who overcame Allen 6-10. Allen then claimed his fifth ranking victory by winning the Scottish Open, securing victory with a 9–7 victory over Murphy in the final. Allen suffered a first round exit at the 2019 World Snooker Championship, losing 7–10 to Zhou Yuelong. He reached his highest ranking, fifth, in March 2019.

=== 2019/2020 season ===
Allen did not reach a final in the first half of the season, losing in all six semi-finals which he reached. In the International Championship and the Shanghai Masters, Allen lost against Murphy, in the English Open he was eliminated by Selby, and in the Champion of Champions he was defeated by Trump. In the 2019 UK Championship, he was whitewashed by Maguire. Allen's attempt to defend the Scottish Open ended in the decider of his semi-finals match against Jack Lisowski. At the 2020 World Championship, Allen equalled the record of making five centuries in a first round match when he played qualifier Jamie Clarke; however, he went on to lose the match against the Welsh world number 89 - the lowest ranked player in the tournament- 8-10. He ended the season where he finished the last one, ranked fifth.

=== 2020/2021 season ===
Allen's most notable achievement during the 2020/2021 season was winning the 2020 Champion of Champions. He defeated Ronnie O'Sullivan in a contentious quarter-final that saw O'Sullivan accusing Allen of deliberately standing in his line of sight and Allen accusing O'Sullivan of being a 'bully'. Allen went on to defeat Judd Trump in the semi-finals and Neil Robertson 10–6 in the final.

=== 2021/2022 season ===
In the 2021/2022 season, Allen won his first Northern Ireland Open title, coming from 6–8 behind in the final to defeat John Higgins 9–8. Earlier in the tournament, in his qualifying round match against Si Jiahui, he made the second maximum break of his professional career. Allen was unable to make a deep run at any of the triple crown events during the season. At the 2021 UK Championship, he was defeated 5‍–‍6 by Gilbert in the last 32, and he lost in the first round of the 2022 Masters 5–6 to Trump. Allen exited the 2022 World Championship after a 4–13 loss to O'Sullivan in the last 16.

=== 2022/2023 season ===
In October, Allen reached the final of the British Open, but was defeated 7–10 by Day. Later in the month, he successfully defended his crown at the Northern Ireland Open. He won eight consecutive frames during his 9‍–‍4 win over Zhou Yuelong in the final, at his home tournament in Belfast. Allen remarked afterwards, "You know how proud a Northern Irishman I am and how much I want to do well here for the fans. To win two years in a row is something." At the 2022 UK Championship, Allen knocked out Jordan Brown, Kyren Wilson, Sam Craigie and Jack Lisowski to reach the final where he won 10–7 against Ding, coming back from 1–6 behind. After his victory, Allen said "To beat Ding in the best of 19 frames match when being 6-1 down is one of my best-ever wins". Allen secured his third title of the season at the World Grand Prix, after triumphing over Trump 10–9 in the final. At the 2023 World Championship, Allen defeated Jak Jones 13–10 in the quarter-final, but then, lost 15–17 against Selby in the semi-final.

=== 2023/2024 season ===
At the 2024 Masters, Allen beat Selby 6–5 in the quarter-finals, scoring a 147 maximum break and coming from 1–4 behind to win. In the semi-finals, he was beaten 3–6 by Carter. Allen won his eleventh ranking title at the Players Championship when he defeated Zhang Anda 10–8 in the final.

At the 2024 World Championship, Allen won his first round game 10–6 against Robbie Williams before losing his second round match to Higgins 12–13.

=== 2024/2025 season ===
At the 2024 UK Championship, Allen reached the semi-finals where he was beaten 5–6 by Hawkins. In December, Allen won the non-ranking Riyadh Season Snooker Championship with a 5–1 victory in the final over Brecel. In January, Allen reached the semi-finals of the 2025 Masters where he was defeated 3‍–‍6 by Murphy. At the 2025 World Championship, Allen hit a 147 break in his second round match against Chris Wakelin. He became the eleventh player to do so at the Crucible, but despite this, it wasn't enough to prevent a 6–13 defeat and an exit from the tournament.

=== 2025/2026 season ===
At the 2025 English Open, Allen won the 12th ranking title of his career. He led Zhou Yuelong 6–2 and 7–3 in the final, but Zhou recovered to win five frames in a row for an 8–7 lead. Allen won the final two frames of the match for a 9–8 victory. At the 2026 Masters, he was defeated in the quarter-finals by Trump. Allen progressed to the semi-finals of the 2026 World Championship, where he led Wu Yize 16–15, before missing a black off the spot which would have put him in the final. He lost the match 16–17.

=== 2026/2027 season ===
Following his loss to Wu at the 2026 World Championship, Allen did not compete professionally for more than five months. At the Northern Ireland Open in October, he lost his opening match 2–4 to Jordan Brown. In a post-match interview, he described himself as "in a bad place" and feeling "really overwhelmed", and said that he was considering retirement. "It’s sad to say, because it’s all I’ve loved to do since I was 12 but the last few months has been really difficult and it’s put snooker into perspective for me. At the minute I’m just trying to survive,” he commented. Speaking of his decision to play at the Northern Ireland Open, he stated: "I felt like I did not want my last match to be remembered for that semi-final in Sheffield. I thought it would be a bit of nostalgia to go out playing Jordan in the Waterfront where it all started in 2005 and that would be a more fitting end if I do call it a day."

== Rivalry ==
Allen has had a rivalry with Stuart Bingham. After Bingham squandered a 12–9 lead in the second round of the 2011 World Snooker Championship to lose 13–12 against Ding Junhui, Allen stated that Bingham had "no bottle" and admitted that there was history between the players and that they did not get on. Bingham responded by calling Allen an idiot and the tension between the two was high as they were drawn to play each other in the second round of the 2011 Australian Goldfields Open. Before the match, Bingham said that he could not wait to play and that he had been waiting for it for a long time. He also stated that he did not care what Allen thought and it would give him more pleasure to beat him. Bingham fulfilled his pre-match words by defeating Allen 5–3 and also went on to win the tournament.

When the draw for the 2011 UK Championship was made it revealed that there was a potential quarter-final clash between the two. Anticipating the meeting, Bingham said that the "feud was not over" and that he would be staying away from Allen and not be speaking to him until they next played. The match-up was avoided, however, when Bingham lost in the first round to Marco Fu. Allen announced before the start of the 2013 World Championship that there was no problem between himself and Bingham since Bingham had proved him wrong by winning tournaments, and the two have had drinks and dinner together. After Bingham won the 2015 World Championship he said "Thanks to Mark Allen. He said I had no bottle and since then things have changed".

Allen also has a rivalry with Mark Joyce and has made no secret of his dislike for him, stating that: "I don't like Mark Joyce, basically he is a dick, on and off the table, I doubt even his mum likes him." He went on to accuse Joyce of gamesmanship during their match at the 2016 Northern Irish Open.

== Controversies ==
After his first-round win at the 2011 UK Championship, Mark Allen called for WPBSA chairman Barry Hearn to resign, claiming Hearn had broken a promise not to change major tournament formats. Allen criticised the new best-of-11 format for the UK Championship, compared the atmosphere to darts, and said snooker tradition was "going to pot." He also swore during the press conference, leading to WPBSA disciplinary action for bringing the game into disrepute. Hearn dismissed Allen's remarks, calling them childish. After a meeting in January 2012, Hearn said they had a frank but friendly exchange, and noted Allen's increased prize money as a sign of progress. Allen was later fined £250.

In 2012, Allen was fined £1,000 by the WPBSA for criticizing conditions at the World Open in Haikou, China, calling them "horrendous."

Mark Allen was fined £11,000 after accusing Cao Yupeng of cheating following his defeat at the 2012 World Snooker Championship. He claimed Cao failed to admit a foul and attributed it to cultural differences, referencing past incidents with other Chinese and Hong Kong players. Barry Hearn said he was "speechless" and confirmed Allen would face disciplinary action. In addition to the fine, Allen was warned he could face a three-month suspension if he breached the rules again within six months and was required to complete media training.

Prior to the commencement of the 2013 World Snooker Championship, Allen renewed his criticisms of Barry Hearn. Allen voiced concerns that the World Snooker Tour's increasing emphasis on events in China was pricing players out of competing, pointing out that since Hearn took over the running of the game players now have to pay for their own flights, which can incur extra expenses of £10,000–£15,000 per season. Allen, who earned £278,000 over the course of the previous two years, further added he did not believe he was being fairly compensated for his services.

At the 2019 World Grand Prix, he conceded the match against Ali Carter in the fifth frame with 11 reds on the table after missing the yellow. He was fined by the WPBSA for the concession and also lost one of his sponsors.

== Personal life ==
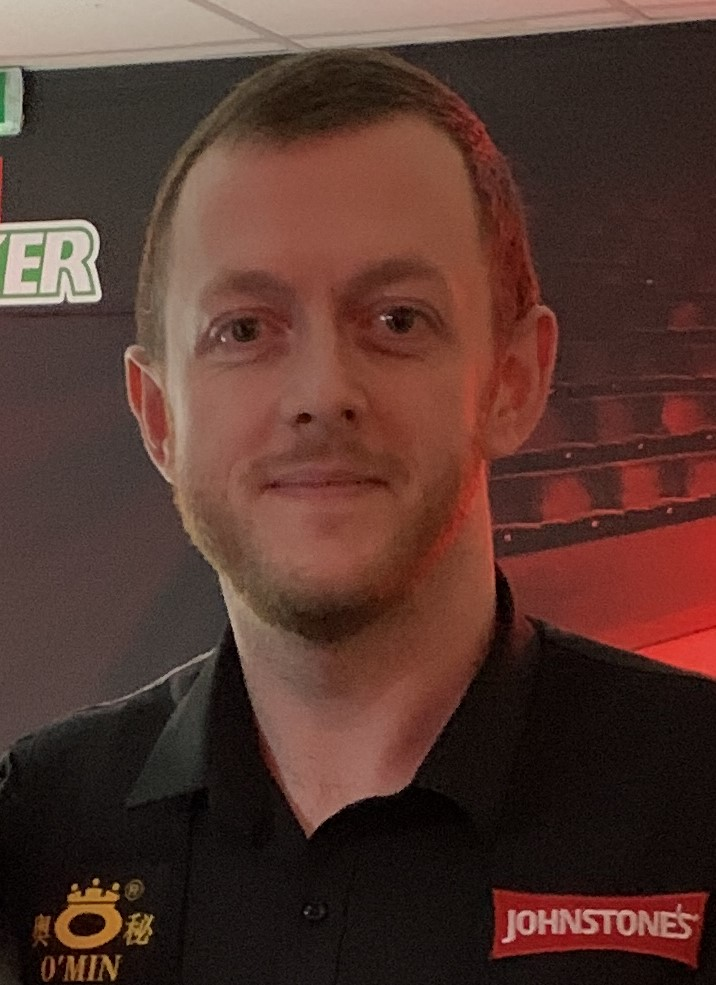
Allen in 2024

From 2005 to 2008, Allen was in a relationship with snooker player Reanne Evans; they have a daughter together, Lauren Sophie, born in May 2006. They have since been involved in a legal dispute over child maintenance payments. In 2022, Allen stated that he no longer sees Lauren, but said "I still think about her all the time".

Allen married Kyla McGuigan in May 2013. Her son from a previous relationship, Robbie McGuigan, won under-16 and under-21 snooker tournaments at an early age and achieved a 147 break in 2018, at age 13. After winning the Northern Ireland Amateur Championship three times, Robbie McGuigan turned professional in 2024. Allen and Kyla McGuigan had a daughter, Harleigh, born in 2017. By May 2020, they had separated and were in the process of divorcing. In May 2021, Allen declared himself bankrupt. In 2022, he became engaged to Aideen Cassidy, whom he had got to know on long walks during the COVID-19 pandemic. They ended their relationship the following year, and Allen began dating Sarah Herald, whom he married in June 2025.

Allen is partially colour blind and sometimes has difficulty distinguishing between the red and brown balls. As his career progressed, he gained significant weight, which he attributed partly to a poor diet while travelling to tournaments. By the 2022 World Snooker Championship, he weighed 19 stone (approx. 120 kg). After Ronnie O'Sullivan defeated him 13–4 in the second round of the tournament, he spoke with Allen about the importance of health and fitness. Over the following four months, Allen lost five stone (approx. 32 kg).

During the COVID-19 pandemic, Allen spent three to four hours a day delivering groceries and prescription medications to vulnerable people in Antrim. In 2024, he launched the Mark Allen Foundation, a charity organisation helping local people in need through fundraisers.

== Performance and rankings timeline ==
Tournaments	2002/ 03	2003/ 04	2004/ 05	2005/ 06	2006/ 07	2007/ 08	2008/ 09	2009/ 10	2010/ 11	2011/ 12	2012/ 13	2013/ 14	2014/ 15	2015/ 16	2016/ 17	2017/ 18	2018/ 19	2019/ 20	2020/ 21	2021/ 22	2022/ 23	2023/ 24	2024/ 25	2025/ 26	2026/ 27
Ranking (Note: It shows the ranking at the beginning of the season)	(Note: He was an amateur)			(Note: New players don't have a ranking)	61	29	16	11	10	12	12	7	9	12	7	10	12	7	5	12	14	3	1	10	12
Ranking tournaments
Championship League	Tournament Not Held					Non-Ranking Event													RR	F	2R	A	A	A	A
China Open	Not Held		A	LQ	LQ	QF	1R	SF	1R	1R	2R	WD	LQ	LQ	A	3R	WD	Tournament Not Held							WD
Wuhan Open	Tournament Not Held																					QF	WD	SF	WD
British Open	A	A	A	Tournament Not Held																2R	F	1R	SF	2R	WD
English Open	Tournament Not Held														3R	2R	2R	SF	2R	LQ	SF	2R	QF	W	WD
Shenzhen Open (Note: The event was called the Xi'an Grand Prix (2024/2025–2025/2026))	Tournament Not Held																						3R	1R	WD
Northern Ireland Open	Tournament Not Held														QF	2R	1R	4R	3R	W	W	1R	2R	SF	1R
International Championship	Tournament Not Held										QF	3R	F	QF	LQ	F	W	SF	Not Held			2R	2R	LQ	WD
UK Championship	A	A	A	2R	LQ	2R	2R	1R	SF	F	1R	QF	3R	3R	4R	4R	F	SF	2R	3R	W	1R	SF	1R	
Shoot Out	Tournament Not Held								Non-Ranking Event						1R	1R	A	1R	4R	QF	1R	W	2R	1R	
Scottish Open (Note: The event was called the Players Championship (2003/2004))	A	A	Tournament Not Held								MR	Not Held			4R	1R	W	SF	4R	LQ	2R	LQ	SF	SF	
German Masters	Tournament Not Held								1R	2R	2R	1R	2R	1R	1R	1R	A	LQ	LQ	SF	LQ	3R	2R	2R	
Welsh Open	A	A	A	LQ	1R	2R	1R	QF	2R	QF	2R	3R	3R	SF	3R	3R	3R	3R	4R	2R	QF	QF	2R	1R	
World Grand Prix	Tournament Not Held												NR	2R	2R	1R	2R	1R	1R	2R	W	2R	1R	1R	
Players Championship (Note: The event was called the Players Tour Championship Grand Final (2010/2011–2015/2016))	Tournament Not Held								DNQ	DNQ	QF	QF	2R	W	DNQ	1R	SF	QF	DNQ	1R	1R	W	1R	SF	
World Open (Note: The event was called the LG Cup (2002/2003–2003/2004) and the Grand Prix (2004/2005–2009/2010))	A	A	A	1R	RR	RR	1R	QF	LQ	W	W	SF	Not Held		A	SF	2R	3R	Not Held			1R	1R	QF	
Tour Championship	Tournament Not Held																SF	F	DNQ	QF	QF	SF	DNQ	1R	
World Championship	LQ	LQ	LQ	LQ	2R	1R	SF	QF	QF	1R	1R	2R	2R	2R	2R	QF	1R	1R	2R	2R	SF	2R	2R	SF	
Non-ranking tournaments
Shanghai Masters	Tournament Not Held					Ranking Event											2R	SF	Not Held			2R	2R	WD	A
Champion of Champions	Tournament Not Held											1R	1R	F	SF	A	SF	SF	W	WD	QF	W	SF	1R	
Riyadh Season Championship (Note: The event was called the World Masters of Snooker (2023/2024))	Tournament Not Held																					SF	W	SF	
The Masters	A	A	A	LQ	LQ	LQ	QF	QF	SF	1R	QF	1R	SF	QF	QF	W	1R	1R	1R	1R	1R	SF	SF	QF	
Championship League	Tournament Not Held					RR	2R	F	2R	SF	2R	A	A	A	RR	WD	A	RR	A	A	A	WD	A	A	
Former ranking tournaments
Northern Ireland Trophy	Not Held			NR	1R	SF	QF	Tournament Not Held																	
Bahrain Championship	Tournament Not Held						SF	Tournament Not Held																	
Wuxi Classic (Note: The event was called the Jiangsu Classic (2008/2009–2009/2010))	Tournament Not Held						Non-Ranking Event				2R	1R	A	Tournament Not Held											
Australian Goldfields Open	Tournament Not Held									QF	A	A	1R	1R	Tournament Not Held										
Shanghai Masters	Tournament Not Held					LQ	LQ	1R	1R	2R	2R	1R	F	SF	2R	3R	Non-Ranking		Not Held			Non-Ranking Event			
Paul Hunter Classic (Note: The event was called the Grand Prix Fürth (2004/2005) and the Fürth German Open (2005/2006–2006/2007))	Not Held		Pro-am Event						Minor-Ranking Event						4R	A	A	NR	Tournament Not Held						
Indian Open	Tournament Not Held											2R	A	NH	A	3R	WD	Tournament Not Held							
Riga Masters (Note: The event was called the Riga Open (2014/2015–2015/2016))	Tournament Not Held												Minor-Rank		WD	LQ	3R	A	Tournament Not Held						
China Championship	Tournament Not Held														NR	1R	2R	2R	Tournament Not Held						
Turkish Masters	Tournament Not Held																			1R	Tournament Not Held				
Gibraltar Open	Tournament Not Held													MR	4R	A	A	WD	QF	3R	Tournament Not Held				
WST Classic	Tournament Not Held																				3R	Tournament Not Held			
European Masters (Note: The event was called the European Open (2002/2003–2003/2004) and the Malta Cup (2004/2005–2007/2008))	A	A	A	1R	LQ	NR	Tournament Not Held								2R	QF	QF	LQ	4R	LQ	LQ	1R	Not Held		
Saudi Arabia Masters	Tournament Not Held																						5R	5R	NH
Former non-ranking tournaments
Northern Ireland Trophy	Not Held			QF	Ranking Event			Tournament Not Held																	
Irish Professional Championship	Not Held			LQ	SF	QF	Tournament Not Held																		
Beijing International Challenge	Tournament Not Held							SF	RR	Tournament Not Held															
Wuxi Classic	Tournament Not Held						A	W	SF	A	Ranking Event			Tournament Not Held											
Power Snooker	Tournament Not Held								A	QF	Tournament Not Held														
Premier League Snooker	A	A	A	A	A	A	A	A	A	A	RR	Tournament Not Held													
World Grand Prix	Tournament Not Held												1R	Ranking Event											
General Cup (Note: The event was called the General Cup International (2004/2005–2011/2012))	Not Held		SF	Tournament Not Held				A	NH	A	A	A	A	A	Tournament Not Held										
Shoot Out	Tournament Not Held								1R	3R	F	3R	2R	2R	Ranking Event										
China Championship	Tournament Not Held														SF	Ranking Event			Tournament Not Held						
Romanian Masters	Tournament Not Held															1R	Tournament Not Held								

Performance Table Legend
LQ	lost in the qualifying draw	#R	lost in the early rounds of the tournament (WR = Wildcard round, RR = Round robin)	QF	lost in the quarter-finals
SF	lost in the semi-finals	F	lost in the final	W	won the tournament
DNQ	did not qualify for the tournament	A	did not participate in the tournament	WD	withdrew from the tournament

NH / Not Held	means an event was not held.
NR / Non-Ranking Event	means an event is/was no longer a ranking event.
R / Ranking Event	means an event is/was a ranking event.
MR / Minor-Ranking Event	means an event is/was a minor-ranking event.
PA / Pro-am Event	means an event is/was a pro-am event.

== Career finals ==
=== Ranking finals: 20 (12 titles) ===
Legend
UK Championship (1–2)
Other (11–6)

Outcome	No.	Year	Championship	Opponent in the final	Score
Runner-up	1.	2011	UK Championship	(England) Judd Trump	8–10
Winner	1.	2012	World Open	(England) Stephen Lee	10–1
Winner	2.	2013	World Open (2)	(Wales) Matthew Stevens	10–4
Runner-up	2.	2014	Shanghai Masters	(England) Stuart Bingham	3–10
Runner-up	3.	2014	International Championship	(England) Ricky Walden	7–10
Winner	3.	2016	Players Tour Championship Finals	(England) Ricky Walden	10–6
Runner-up	4.	2017	International Championship (2)	(England) Mark Selby	7–10
Winner	4.	2018	International Championship	(Australia) Neil Robertson	10–5
Runner-up	5.	2018	UK Championship (2)	(England) Ronnie O'Sullivan	6–10
Winner	5.	2018	Scottish Open	(England) Shaun Murphy	9–7
Runner-up	6.	2020	Tour Championship	(Scotland) Stephen Maguire	6–10
Runner-up	7.	2021	Championship League	(England) David Gilbert	1–3
Winner	6.	2021	Northern Ireland Open	(Scotland) John Higgins	9–8
Runner-up	8.	2022	British Open	(Wales) Ryan Day	7–10
Winner	7.	2022	Northern Ireland Open (2)	(China) Zhou Yuelong	9–4
Winner	8.	2022	UK Championship	(China) Ding Junhui	10–7
Winner	9.	2023	World Grand Prix	(England) Judd Trump	10–9
Winner	10.	2023	Snooker Shoot Out	(China) Cao Yupeng	1–0
Winner	11.	2024	Players Championship	(China) Zhang Anda	10–8
Winner	12.	2025	English Open	(China) Zhou Yuelong	9–8

=== Minor-ranking finals: 6 (5 titles) ===
Outcome	No.	Year	Championship	Opponent in the final	Score
Winner	1.	2012	Antwerp Open	(England) Mark Selby	4–1
Winner	2.	2013	Ruhr Open	(China) Ding Junhui	4–1
Winner	3.	2013	Kay Suzanne Memorial Cup	(England) Judd Trump	4–1
Runner-up	1.	2014	Riga Open	(England) Mark Selby	3–4
Winner	4.	2014	Paul Hunter Classic	(England) Judd Trump	4–2
Winner	5.	2015	Bulgarian Open	(Wales) Ryan Day	4–0

=== Non-ranking finals: 10 (6 titles) ===
Legend
The Masters (1–0)
Champion of Champions (2–1)
Other (3–3)

Outcome	No.	Year	Championship	Opponent in the final	Score
Runner-up	1.	2005	Challenge Tour – Event 3	(Scotland) James McBain	3–6
Winner	1.	2009	Jiangsu Classic	(China) Ding Junhui	6–0
Runner-up	2.	2010	Championship League	(Hong Kong) Marco Fu	2–3
Runner-up	3.	2013	Snooker Shoot Out	(England) Martin Gould	0–1
Runner-up	4.	2015	Champion of Champions	(Australia) Neil Robertson	5–10
Winner	2.	2018	The Masters	(England) Kyren Wilson	10–7
Winner	3.	2020	Champion of Champions	(Australia) Neil Robertson	10–6
Winner	4.	2023	Champion of Champions (2)	(England) Judd Trump	10–3
Winner	5.	2024	Riyadh Season Snooker Championship	(Belgium) Luca Brecel	5–1
Winner	6.	2025	Helsinki International Cup	(China) Zhang Anda	6–3

=== Team finals: 2 (1 title) ===
Outcome	No.	Year	Championship	Team/partner	Opponent(s) in the final	Score
Winner	1.	2006	World Mixed Doubles Championship	(England) Reanne Evans	(England) Matthew Couch (England) Sonia Chapman	3–0
Runner-up	1.	2011	World Cup	Northern Ireland	China	2–4

=== Pro-am finals: 5 (4 titles) ===
Outcome	No.	Year	Championship	Opponent in the final	Score
Winner	1.	2004	Barry McNamee Memorial Trophy	(Northern Ireland) Kieran McMahon	6–1
Winner	2.	2005	Barry McNamee Memorial Trophy (2)	(Republic of Ireland) Joe Delaney	6–5
Winner	3.	2007	Barry McNamee Memorial Trophy (3)	(Northern Ireland) Joe Swail	3–1
Winner	4.	2008	Barry McNamee Memorial Trophy (4)	(Republic of Ireland) David Morris	3–1
Runner-up	1.	2019	Pink Ribbon	(England) Stuart Bingham	3–4

=== Amateur finals: 6 (5 titles) ===
Outcome	No.	Year	Championship	Opponent in the final	Score
Winner	1.	2003	Northern Ireland Amateur Championship	(Northern Ireland) Colin Bingham	10–4
Runner-up	1.	2004	European Under-19 Amateur Championship	(Wales) Jamie Jones	3–6
Winner	2.	2004	European Amateur Championship	(Malta) Alex Borg	7–6
Winner	3.	2004	World Amateur Championship	(Australia) Steve Mifsud	11–6
Winner	4.	2005	European Under-19 Amateur Championship	(England) Chris Norbury	6–5
Winner	5.	2005	Northern Ireland Amateur Championship (2)	(Northern Ireland) Kieran McMahon	10–1
