= 2016 China Championship =

2016 Evergrande China Championship
Tournament information
- Dates: 1–5 November 2016
- Venue: Guangzhou Gymnasium
- City: Guangzhou
- Country: China
- Organisation: WPBSA
- Format: Non-ranking event
- Total prize fund: £650,000
- Winner's share: £200,000
- Highest break: (England) Shaun Murphy (144)

Final
- Champion: (Scotland) John Higgins
- Runner-up: (England) Stuart Bingham
- Score: 10–7

The 2016 China Championship (officially the 2016 Evergrande China Championship) was a professional non-ranking snooker tournament that took place between 1–5 November 2016 in Guangzhou, China.

It was the first staging of the tournament, and the plans were for it to become a full ranking event for the following three years, with the biggest prize pool for any event ever held outside the UK previously.

John Higgins became the inaugural winner by beating Stuart Bingham 10–7 in the final.

== Prize fund ==
The breakdown of prize money from this year is shown below:

- Winner: £200,000
- Runner-up: £100,000
- Semi-final: £50,000
- Quarter-final: £30,000
- Last 16: £15,000
- Highest break: £10,000
- Total: £650,000

The "rolling 147 prize" for a maximum break stands at £TBD.

== Seeding list ==
The top 10 snooker players on the ranking list after the Shanghai Masters, along with the top 4 players on the one year prize money ranking list were invited to participate in the event. The remaining two players (Marco Fu and Liang Wenbo) were selected by the Chinese Billiards and Snooker Association. Mark Williams became eligible to participate after the withdrawal of world number 10 Ronnie O'Sullivan from the competition, as he was next in line to qualify through his official world ranking.

Seed	Player	Total Rankings	1 Year Rankings
1	(England) Mark Selby	690,650	60,775
2	(England) Stuart Bingham	516,534	34,775
3	(England) Shaun Murphy	447,308	26,000
4	(England) Judd Trump	409,166	19,000
5	(Scotland) John Higgins	408,725	22,750
6	(China) Ding Junhui	376,925	91,500
7	(Australia) Neil Robertson	359,582	58,500
8	(Northern Ireland) Mark Allen	336,592	9,725
9	(England) Ricky Walden	312,208	9,400
w/d	(England) Ronnie O'Sullivan	302,333	8,000
10	(Wales) Mark Williams	243,008	22,250
11	(England) Ali Carter	226,200	105,150
12	(Scotland) Anthony McGill	197,375	73,525
13	(England) Joe Perry	295,133	41,050
14	(England) Michael Holt	149,683	38,150
	(Hong Kong) Marco Fu	Qualified via CBSA Wildcard	
	(China) Liang Wenbo	Qualified via CBSA Wildcard	

Player qualified via general ranking list.
Player qualified via one-year ranking list.

== Main draw ==
Last 16; Best of 11 frames
1	(England) Mark Selby	6
12	(Scotland) Anthony McGill	2
8	(Northern Ireland) Mark Allen	6
9	(England) Ricky Walden	4
5	(Scotland) John Higgins	6
10	(Wales) Mark Williams	4
4	(England) Judd Trump	4
11	(England) Ali Carter	6
3	(England) Shaun Murphy	6
13	(England) Joe Perry	4
6	(China) Ding Junhui	3
(Hong Kong) Marco Fu	6
7	(Australia) Neil Robertson	5
14	(England) Michael Holt	6
2	(England) Stuart Bingham	6
(China) Liang Wenbo	2

Quarter-finals; Best of 11 frames
1	(England) Mark Selby	5
8	(Northern Ireland) Mark Allen	6
5	(Scotland) John Higgins	6
11	(England) Ali Carter	2
3	(England) Shaun Murphy	6
(Hong Kong) Marco Fu	2
14	(England) Michael Holt	5
2	(England) Stuart Bingham	6

Semi-finals; Best of 17 frames
8	(Northern Ireland) Mark Allen	3
5	(Scotland) John Higgins	9
3	(England) Shaun Murphy	8
2	(England) Stuart Bingham	9

Final; Best of 19 frames
5	(Scotland) John Higgins	10
2	(England) Stuart Bingham	7

== Final ==
Final: Best of 19 frames. Referee: Zhou Ying. Guangzhou Gymnasium, Guangzhou, China, 5 November 2016.
John Higgins (5); Scotland	10–7	Stuart Bingham (2); England
Afternoon: 77–37, 74–17, 72–1, 1–127 (102), 18–112 (112), 49–75 (52), 69–0, 70–58 (65, 58), 14–100 (50); Evening: 28–55, 4–98 (98), 81–0 (56), 71–10 (65), 0–84 (84), 134–1 (134), 105–21 (100), 129–8 (101)
134	Highest break	112
3	Century breaks	2
6	50+ breaks	7

== Century breaks ==
- 144, 129, 121, 101 – Shaun Murphy
- 141, 122, 118, 114, 112, 104, 102 – Stuart Bingham
- 140, 131, 114, 106, 100 – Mark Allen
- 134, 131, 123, 101, 100 – John Higgins
- 127 – Mark Selby
